= The Box Set (The Twelfth Man album) =

Box set by The Twelfth Man
- Released: November 2009
- Recorded: 1984–2006
- Genres: Comedy, spoken word
- Label: EMI Music
- Producers: Billy Birmingham, David Froggatt

The Twelfth Man chronology
Boned! (2006)	The Box Set (2009)	Willy Nilly: The 12th Man's Biggest Hits, Vol. 1 (2013)

The Box Set is a box set containing all 7 albums by The Twelfth Man, a comedy project by Australian satirist Billy Birmingham. The set was released in November 2009 to celebrate the 25th anniversary of the first Twelfth Man release. The set peaked at number 17 on the ARIA Charts.

The box set is notably missing "It's Just Not Cricket", his debut release. Also, Bruce 2000 appears twice on the set, ending both Wired World Of Sports albums as it had been included on their 2000 reissues.

== Background and release ==
Birmingham's career in comedy began when he wrote Austen Tayshus' hit "Australiana" in 1983. In 1984, Birmingham released "It's Just Not Cricket" under the name The Twelfth Man. It became the first of two Twelfth Man singles to reach number 1 on the singles chart.

In 1987, The Twelfth Man released the first of seven albums to peak at number 1 on the Australian album chart and has become one of the most successful spoken-word recording artists in the world, with sales in excess of two million albums in Australia alone. The 12th man is the only Australian recording artist in history to have seven consecutive number one albums and is a multi-ARIA Award winner.

Birmingham believes political correctness would render it impossible to launch such a project in 2009.

On 22 November 2009, in an article in the Sydney Morning Herald, Birmingham announced he will be retiring The Twelfth Man.

== Track listing ==
=== CD 1 ===
Wired World of Sports

Bonus track: "Bruce 2000: A "Special" Tribute"

=== CD 2 ===
The 12th Man Again

Bonus track: "England V India"

=== CD 3 ===
Still the 12th Man

Bonus track: "England V Sri Lanka"

=== CD 4 ===
Wired World of Sports II

Bonus tracks: "Richie, Bill & Tony Interview N.Z. Cricket Captain Martin Crowe", "Triple M's Gary "Badge" Belcher Interviews Reg Warren (Ray Warren's Brother)", "Reg Warren (Ray Warren's Brother) Interviews NSW Origin Player Terry Hill", "Reg Warren (Ray Warren's Brother) Interviews QLD Origin Player Gary Larson", "Reg Warren (Ray Warren's Brother) Interviews NSW Origin Coach Tommy Raudonikis", "Bruce 2000"

=== CD 5 ===
Bill Lawry... This Is Your Life

=== CD 6 ===
The Final Dig?

=== CD 7 ===
Boned!

== Charts ==
=== Weekly charts ===
Chart (2009/10)	Peak position
Australian Albums (ARIA)	17

=== Year-end charts ===
Chart (2009)	Position
Australian (ARIA Charts)	96
Australian artist (ARIA Charts)	28

== Release history ==
Region	Date	Format	Edition(s)	Label	Catalogue
Australia	November 2009	CD; digital download	Standard	EMI Music	
