= ARIA Award for Highest-Selling Album =

Former Australian music award

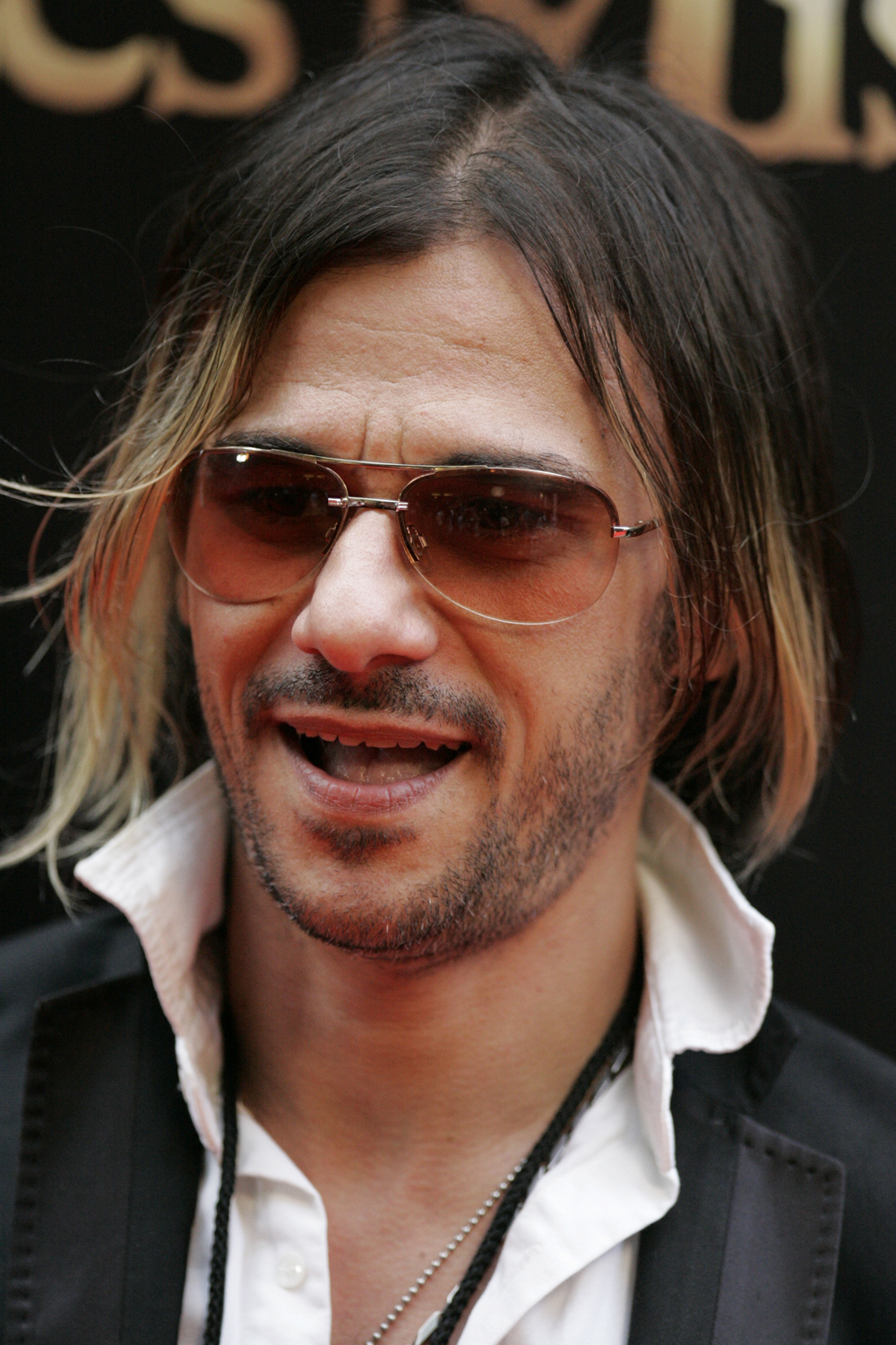
- 2011 winner Altiyan Childs
- Country: Australia
- Presented by: Australian Recording Industry Association (ARIA)
- First award: 1987
- Final award: 2011
- Currently held by: Altiyan Childs, Altiyan Childs (2011)

Highlights
- Most wins: John Farnham (5)
- Most nominations: John Farnham (10)
- Website: www.ariaawards.com.au

The ARIA Music Award for Highest-Selling Album was an award presented at the annual ARIA Music Awards. It was presented from 1987 through to 2011.

John Farnham holds the record for the most wins at five (1987, 1989, 1991, 1994, 1999), as well as his involvement in the Australian Cast Recording of Jesus Christ Superstar, which won in 1993. He also received the most nominations with 10, or 11 counting Jesus Christ Superstar. The only other artists to win multiple awards in this category were Savage Garden, who won twice in 1998 and 2000, and Delta Goodrem, who won three times in 2003, 2004 and 2008. Five artists were nominated for the same albums twice; Wendy Matthews for Lily in 1993 and 1994, Tina Arena for Don't Ask in 1995 and 1996, winning in the latter year, Savage Garden for their self-titled album in 1997 and 1998, winning in the latter year, and Affirmation in 2000 and 2001, winning in the former year, Kasey Chambers for Barricades & Brickwalls in 2002 and 2003 and Goodrem for Innocent Eyes in 2003 and 2004, winning both years and becoming the only artist to win two awards for the same album. Not counting various artists albums, Jimmy Barnes was the only musician nominated for two acts in the same year, as in 1992 he won for his solo album Soul Deep and his band Cold Chisel were also nominated for the compilation album Chisel.

== Winners and nominees ==
In the following table, the winner is highlighted in a separate colour, and in boldface; the nominees are those that are not highlighted or in boldface.

Winner marked in a separate colour

| Year | Winner(s) | Album title |
|---|---|---|
**1987** (1st)
| **1987** (1st) | **John Farnham** | **Whispering Jack** |
| **1987** (1st) | Dragon | Dreams of Ordinary Men |
| **1987** (1st) | Tim Finn | Big Canoe |
| **1987** (1st) | Icehouse | Measure for Measure |
| **1987** (1st) | Rodney Rude | Rude Rides Again |
| **1987** (1st) | Spy V Spy | A.O. Mod. TV. Vers. |
| **1987** (1st) | Kevin Bloody Wilson | Kev's Back |
| **1988** (2nd) | **Icehouse** | **Man of Colours** |
**1989** (3rd)
| **1989** (3rd) | **John Farnham** | **Age of Reason** |
| **1989** (3rd) | The Comedy Company | The Comedy Company Album |
| **1989** (3rd) | Crowded House | Temple of Low Men |
| **1989** (3rd) | 1927 | ...ish |
| **1989** (3rd) | Kylie Minogue | Kylie |
| **1989** (3rd) | Various Artists | Australia All Over Vol. 2 |
| **1990** (4th) | **Johnny Diesel** | **Johnny Diesel and the Injectors** |
| **1991** (5th) | **John Farnham** | **Chain Reaction** |
**1992** (6th)
| **1992** (6th) | **Jimmy Barnes** | **Soul Deep** |
| **1992** (6th) | Cold Chisel | Chisel |
| **1992** (6th) | Crowded House | Woodface |
| **1992** (6th) | Ratcat | Blind Love |
| **1992** (6th) | Noiseworks | Love Versus Money |
| **1992** (6th) | John Farnham | Full House |
**1993** (7th)
| **1993** (7th) | **Australian Cast Recording** | **Jesus Christ Superstar** |
| **1993** (7th) | Diesel | Hepfidelity |
| **1993** (7th) | Rockmelons | Form 1 Planet |
| **1993** (7th) | Noiseworks | Greatest Hits |
| **1993** (7th) | Wendy Matthews | Lily |
| **1993** (7th) | Hoodoo Gurus | Electric Soup/Gorilla Biscuit |
**1994** (8th)
| **1994** (8th) | **John Farnham** | **Then Again...** |
| **1994** (8th) | Jimmy Barnes | Flesh and Wood |
| **1994** (8th) | The Black Sorrows | The Chosen Ones - Greatest Hits |
| **1994** (8th) | Wendy Matthews | Lily |
| **1994** (8th) | The Seekers | The Silver Jubilee Album |
**1995** (9th)
| **1995** (9th) | **The Twelfth Man** | **Wired World of Sports II** |
| **1995** (9th) | Tina Arena | Don't Ask |
| **1995** (9th) | The Badloves | Get On Board |
| **1995** (9th) | The Cruel Sea | Three Legged Dog |
| **1995** (9th) | Wendy Matthews | The Witness Tree |
**1996** (10th)
| **1996** (10th) | **Tina Arena** | **Don't Ask** |
| **1996** (10th) | John Williamson | True Blue – The Very Best of John Williamson |
| **1996** (10th) | Martin/Molloy | The Brown Album |
| **1996** (10th) | Merril Bainbridge | The Garden |
| **1996** (10th) | Max Sharam | A Million Year Girl |
**1997** (11th)
| **1997** (11th) | **Crowded House** | **Recurring Dream** |
| **1997** (11th) | Jimmy Barnes | Barnes Hits Anthology |
| **1997** (11th) | John Farnham | Romeo's Heart |
| **1997** (11th) | Powderfinger | Double Allergic |
| **1997** (11th) | Savage Garden | Savage Garden |
**1998** (12th)
| **1998** (12th) | **Savage Garden** | **Savage Garden** |
| **1998** (12th) | John Farnham | Anthology 1: Greatest Hits 1986–1997 |
| **1998** (12th) | Midnight Oil | 20,000 Watt R.S.L. |
| **1998** (12th) | The Twelfth Man | Bill Lawry... This Is Your Life |
| **1998** (12th) | Tina Arena | In Deep |
**1999** (13th)
| **1999** (13th) | **John Farnham, Olivia Newton-John and Anthony Warlow** | **Highlights from The Main Event** |
| **1999** (13th) | Cold Chisel | The Last Wave of Summer |
| **1999** (13th) | Natalie Imbruglia | Left of the Middle |
| **1999** (13th) | Regurgitator | Unit |
| **1999** (13th) | The Living End | The Living End |
**2000** (14th)
| **2000** (14th) | **Savage Garden** | **Affirmation** |
| **2000** (14th) | Bardot | Bardot |
| **2000** (14th) | Killing Heidi | Reflector |
| **2000** (14th) | Taxiride | Imaginate |
| **2000** (14th) | Vanessa Amorosi | The Power |
**2001** (15th)
| **2001** (15th) | **Powderfinger** | **Odyssey Number Five** |
| **2001** (15th) | John Farnham | 33 1/3 |
| **2001** (15th) | Kylie Minogue | Light Years |
| **2001** (15th) | Savage Garden | Affirmation |
| **2001** (15th) | Slim Dusty | Looking Forward Looking Back |
**2002** (16th)
| **2002** (16th) | **Kylie Minogue** | **Fever** |
| **2002** (16th) | Alex Lloyd | Watching Angels Mend |
| **2002** (16th) | Kasey Chambers | Barricades & Brickwalls |
| **2002** (16th) | Nikki Webster | Follow Your Heart |
| **2002** (16th) | The Twelfth Man | The Final Dig? |
**2003** (17th)
| **2003** (17th) | **Delta Goodrem** | **Innocent Eyes** |
| **2003** (17th) | John Farnham | The Last Time |
| **2003** (17th) | Kasey Chambers | Barricades & Brickwalls |
| **2003** (17th) | Powderfinger | Vulture Street |
| **2003** (17th) | Silverchair | Diorama |
**2004** (18th)
| **2004** (18th) | **Delta Goodrem** | **Innocent Eyes** |
| **2004** (18th) | Guy Sebastian | Just as I Am |
| **2004** (18th) | Jet | Get Born |
| **2004** (18th) | Pete Murray | Feeler |
| **2004** (18th) | Shannon Noll | That's What I'm Talking About |
**2005** (19th)
| **2005** (19th) | **Missy Higgins** | **The Sound of White** |
| **2005** (19th) | Anthony Callea | Anthony Callea |
| **2005** (19th) | Casey Donovan | For You |
| **2005** (19th) | Delta Goodrem | Mistaken Identity |
| **2005** (19th) | Guy Sebastian | Beautiful Life |
**2006** (20th)
| **2006** (20th) | **Human Nature** | **Reach Out: The Motown Record** |
| **2006** (20th) | Bernard Fanning | Teas and Sympathy |
| **2006** (20th) | Pete Murray | See the Sun |
| **2006** (20th) | Rogue Traders | Here Come the Drums |
| **2006** (20th) | The Veronicas | The Secret Life Of... |
**2007** (21st)
| **2007** (21st) | **Damien Leith** | **The Winner's Journey** |
| **2007** (21st) | Missy Higgins | On a Clear Night |
| **2007** (21st) | Human Nature | Dancing in the Street: the Songs of Motown II |
| **2007** (21st) | Silverchair | Young Modern |
| **2007** (21st) | The Twelfth Man | Boned! |
**2008** (22nd)
| **2008** (22nd) | **Delta Goodrem** | **Delta** |
| **2008** (22nd) | David Campbell | The Swing Sessions 2 |
| **2008** (22nd) | Guy Sebastian | The Memphis Album |
| **2008** (22nd) | The Veronicas | Hook Me Up |
| **2008** (22nd) | Tina Arena | Songs of Love & Loss |
**2009** (23rd)
| **2009** (23rd) | **AC/DC** | **Black Ice** |
| **2009** (23rd) | Empire of the Sun | Walking on a Dream |
| **2009** (23rd) | Hilltop Hoods | State of the Art |
| **2009** (23rd) | Jessica Mauboy | Been Waiting |
| **2009** (23rd) | The Presets | Apocalypso |
**2010** (24th)
| **2010** (24th) | No award given | |
**2011** (25th)
| **2011** (25th) | **Altiyan Childs** | **Altiyan Childs** |
| **2011** (25th) | Angus & Julia Stone | Down the Way |
| **2011** (25th) | Birds of Tokyo | Birds of Tokyo |
| **2011** (25th) | Keith Urban | Get Closer |
| **2011** (25th) | Various Artists | He Will Have His Way |

== Artists with multiple wins ==
6 wins

- John Farnham (Note: Including the Australian Cast Recording of Jesus Christ Superstar.)

3 wins

- Delta Goodrem

2 wins

- Savage Garden

== Artists with multiple nominations ==
11 nominations

- John Farnham

6 nominations

- Jimmy Barnes (Note: Including two as a member of Cold Chisel and the various artists album He Will Have His Way.)

5 nominations

- Darren Hayes (Note: Four as a member of Savage Garden and the various artists album He Will Have His Way.)

4 nominations

- Tina Arena
- Bernard Fanning (Note: Including three as a member of Powderfinger.)
- Delta Goodrem
- Savage Garden
- The Twelfth Man

3 nominations

- Crowded House
- Tim Finn (Note: Including two as a member of Crowded House in 1992 and 1997.)
- Wendy Matthews
- Kylie Minogue
- Powderfinger
- Guy Sebastian
- Jon Stevens (Note: Two as a member of Noiseworks and the Australian Cast Recording of Jesus Christ Superstar.)

2 nominations

- Kasey Chambers
- Chris Cheney (Note: One as a member of the Living End and the various artists album He Will Have His Way.)
- Cold Chisel
- Diesel
- Slim Dusty (Note: Including the various artists album Australia All Over Vol. 2.)
- Missy Higgins
- Human Nature
- Icehouse
- Pete Murray
- Noiseworks
- Silverchair
- Luke Steele (Note: One as a member of Empire of the Sun and the various artists album He Will Have His Way as a member of the Sleepy Jackson.)
- Angus Stone (Note: One as a member of Angus & Julia Stone and the various artists album He Will Have His Way.)
- The Veronicas
- John Williamson
