= Willy Nilly: The 12th Man's Biggest Hits =

Compilation album by The Twelfth Man
- Released: 22 November 2013
- Recorded: 1984–2006
- Genres: Spoken word, comedy music
- Length: 154 mins
- Label: Little Digger Productions / Universal Music Australia
- Producers: Billy Birmingham, David Frogatt

The Twelfth Man chronology
The Box Set (2009)	Willy Nilly: The 12th Man's Biggest Hits (2013)	The Very Best of Richie (2015)

Willy Nilly: The 12th Man's Biggest Hits is the first compilation album released by The Twelfth Man. Willy Nilly: The 12th Man's Biggest Hits was released in November 2013 and peaked at number three on the ARIA Charts.

Billy Birmingham said, "I dedicated Willy Nilly to Tony Greig because out of all the commentators, he got the 12th Man better than anyone. We did a couple of gigs together and it was funny standing shoulder to shoulder while I am taking the piss out of his voice. He knew the success of the 12th Man had done nothing to harm Channel 9's coverage or their reputation."

== Track listing ==
1. "Classic Commentary Competition" - 5:48
2. "England V India (1987-88)" (edit) - 5:11
3. "Chappelli's Plays of the Month" - 6:40
4. "Big Merv's Big Guts" - 3:35
5. "Pearce Off Jack" - 5:33
6. "Straight Down His Throat" - 4:17
7. "Rick Diznek" - 2:35
8. "Marvellous!" (edit) - 5:06
9. "Australia V Sri Lanka (1991)" - 6:20
10. "Tappy... Boom!" - 3:41
11. "Richie's Nightmare" - 3:00
12. "Bear at the Sport's Desk" - 5:19
13. "Name Pronunciation Lessons" - 3:47
14. "Boony's Player Comfort" - 3:39
15. "Protectorcam" - 4:16
16. "England V Sri Lanka 1999" (edit) - 4:58
17. "Corm Down Bull" - 4:03
18. "Commentary Box Hijack" - 5:09
19. "Spatfa" - 5:46
20. "Crackcam Says... Gawn!" - 4:00
21. "Bill's Proboscotomy" - 5:18
22. "Scrotometers" - 5:26
23. "Max and Rabs Auditions" - 5:53
24. "Bill Lawry...Tributes" - 6:05
25. "Tony's Hair Hat" - 5:23
26. "Reg Warren (Ray Warren's Brother) Interviews NSW Origin Player Tommy Raudonikis" - 3:34
27. "Tubby and Hansie" - 4:00
28. "Henri Porte" - 1:48
29. "Bill's Nose Job" - 4:46
30. "Bruce 2000: A Special Tribute" - 4:40
31. "Boned By Phone" - 4:11
32. "Kerry's Heavenly Advice" - 6:09
33. "Bill V Tony (2006) - 4:47

== Charts ==
=== Weekly charts ===
Chart (2013/14)	Peak position
Australian Albums (ARIA)	3

=== Year-end charts ===
Chart (2013)	Position
Australian (ARIA Charts)	15
Australian artist (ARIA Charts)	2

== Certifications ==
Region	Certification	Certified units/sales
Australia (ARIA)	Platinum	70,000^{^}
^{^} Shipments figures based on certification alone.

== Release history ==
Region	Date	Format	Label	Catalogue
Australia	22 November 2013	2x CD; digital download	Little Digger Productions / Universal Music Australia	3764299

== See also ==
- List of Top 25 albums for 2013 in Australia
