= Wide World of Sports (Australian TV program) =

Australian sports TV program

- Genre: Sports
- Presented by: Nick McArdle
- Country of origin: Australia
- Original language: English
- No. of seasons: 24

Production
- Production location: TCN-9 Willoughby, New South Wales
- Running time: 60 minutes (including commercials)

Original release
- Network: Nine Network
- Release: 23 May 1981 – 1999
- Release: 16 March 2008 – 2016
- Release: 3 March 2024 – present

Related
- Sports Sunday

Wide World of Sports is an Australian sports television program broadcast on the Nine Network.

The show is hosted by Nick McArdle, with former Australian cricket captain Mark Taylor, Gus Worland, Chloe Dalton and a roster of rotating panelists.

The show originally aired from 23 May 1981, until the end of 1999. After a nine-year hiatus, it returned on 16 March 2008 and had its last episode in 2016 following Ken Sutcliffe's retirement. It was replaced by a new sport talk show Sports Sunday airing its first episode on 5 March 2017. It returned on 3 March 2024, after a seven-year hiatus, as a rename of Sports Sunday.

== History ==
=== 1981–1999 – Weekly shows ===
Wide World of Sports (WWoS) is a long-used title for Nine's sport programming. All sports broadcasts on Nine air under the WWoS brand. It was also the name of a popular sports magazine program that aired most Saturdays and Sundays. This program filled many of the summer daytime hours. The program premiered at 1:00 pm on Saturday, 23 May 1981, and was initially hosted by Mike Gibson and Ian Chappell, before being hosted in the 1990s by Max Walker and Ken Sutcliffe. Ian Maurice was the regular anchor at the WWOS Update Desk.

After being briefly repackaged in 1999 as Sports Saturday, the show ended later that year; its purpose largely rendered obsolete due in large part to the rise of subscription sports channels in Australia, including Fox Sports, which Nine's owner owned half of.

It was unrelated to the series Wide World of Sports aired by ABC in the United States, which started in 1961.

In the early 1980s, well-known hosts and presenters on Wide World of Sports included Mike Gibson and Ian Chappell, both the inaugural hosts of the Saturday afternoon program in 1981. Billy Birmingham in 1984 released a comedy album that satirized cricket "and in particular Channel Nine’s iconic commentary team with Richie Benaud the central figure," which became popular in Australia, A later album was called The Wired World of Sports. Among the hosts satirized were his friend Mike Gibson. The television show won "Most Popular Sports Program" at the Logie Awards in 1986.

In 1990s, the Wide World of Sports marketed sports paraphernalia such as signed and framed bats, and items from the Australian Rugby League. Paul Sheahan hosted Nine's Wide World of Sports program until 1999. Max Walker hosted until it ended in 1999.

=== 2008–2020 – Show's return to TV ===
After a ten-year hiatus, it was announced that the Wide World of Sports weekly television program would return to Nine on 16 March 2008, using the same theme song as the old version, as well as accessing old footage for replays. This show was hosted by the previous host Ken Sutcliffe, with footy show star James Brayshaw as well as former Australian cricketer Adam Gilchrist. Revolving co-hosts included former swimmers Giaan Rooney, Nicole Livingstone and former cricketer Michael Slater. The show originally aired for 90 minutes but was recently extended to two hours. It aired on Sunday mornings at 9am till 11am.

In 2009, Grant Hackett and Michael Slater joined the team as co-hosts alongside Sutcliffe and Rooney.

After she was fired in 2014 as a cost-cutting measure, in 2016 Emma Freedman again signed up with Channel Nine's Wide World of Sports as an announcer. The weekly show was no longer airing as of 2017. Sports Sunday replaced the show in the Sunday 10am time slot.

In 2019, it broadcast the Australian Open with its own team of commentators.

Macquarie Media in 2020 began airing an hour-long Wide World of Sports radio broadcast hosted by Mark Levy.

=== 2024–present — Show's second return to TV ===
In March 2024, after a seven-year hiatus, it was announced that the Wide World of Sports weekly television program would return to Nine on 3 March 2024, as a rename of Sports Sunday, hosted by Roz Kelly. In the first episode of 2024, Kelly was joined by former cricket captain Mark Taylor, AFL great Jimmy Bartel and the Australian Paralympian Ellie Cole.

In June 2025, Kelly resigned from the Nine Network to spend more time with her family. Nick McArdle replaced Kelly.

== Hosts ==
=== Current ===
- Nick McArdle

=== Past ===
- Ian Chappell
- Lisa Curry
- Sally Fitzgibbons
- Emma Freedman
- Ian Maurice
- Mike Gibson
- Tony Greig
- Max Walker
- Adam Gilchrist
- Giaan Rooney
- Yvonne Sampson
- Michael Slater
- Clint Stanaway
- John Steffenson
- Ken Sutcliffe
- Richie Calendar
- Roz Kelly

== Awards ==
The show won the Logie Award for the Most Popular Sports Program in 1987, and was nominated for every year from 2009 to 2017.
