= Wired World of Sports =

Studio album by The Twelfth Man
- Released: 1987
- Recorded: 1987
- Genre: Spoken word, comedy
- Length: 35:36
- Label: EMI Music
- Producer: Billy Birmingham, David Froggatt

The Twelfth Man chronology
Wired World of Sports (1987)	The 12th Man Again (1990)

Wired World of Sports is the debut album released by The Twelfth Man. Released in 1987, it reached number one on the Kent Music Report in February 1988.

At the ARIA Music Awards of 1988, the album won Best Comedy Release.

== Plot ==
A spoof episode of Wide World of Sports with Birmingham impersonating the voices of hosts Mike Gibson and Ian Chappell, and other sports commentators such as Richie Benaud, Darrell Eastlake, Jack Gibson, Max Walker, Lou Richards, Murray Walker, Ken Callander and John Tapp.

== Reception ==
Richie Benaud reviewed the album saying "Plus mark, excellent entertainment as always. Minus mark, the same as last time. A bit too long, too much swearing for the sake of it and Chappelli's voice still not right. But in a word: brilliant".

== Track listing ==
CD (CDP 748887)

1. "Wired World Of Sports" - 35:36
2. "It's Just Not Cricket" - 10:47

== Charts ==
=== Weekly charts ===
Chart (1987/88)	Position
Australian Kent Music Report	1

=== Year-end charts ===
Chart (1988)	Position
Australian (Kent Music Report)	19
Australian (ARIA Charts)	25

== See also ==
- List of number-one albums in Australia during the 1980s
