= The Very Best of Richie =

Compilation album by The Twelfth Man
- Released: 27 November 2015
- Recorded: 1984–2006
- Genre: Spoken word, comedy music
- Label: Little Digger Productions / Universal Music Australia
- Producer: Billy Birmingham, David Frogatt

The Twelfth Man chronology
Willy Nilly: The 12th Man's Biggest Hits (2013)	The Very Best of Richie (2015)

The Very Best of Richie is the second compilation album released by The Twelfth Man and was released in November 2015. Billy Birmingham says The Very Best of Richie is a tribute to Richie Benaud "the greatest commentator of them all" who died in April 2015.

The album peaked at number four on the ARIA Charts.

== Reception ==
Dylan Marshall of The Music AU gave the album 7.5 out of 10 saying "It’s quite funny listening to the evolution of the Richie character. From the earliest material... it’s pretty obvious that the emphasis of The 12th Man’s material goes from being very match commentary-centric to then focusing on the interactions between the commentary team in later material" adding "All in all, The Very Best Of Richie truly is the very best: a classic catch."

== Track listing ==
1. "It's Just Not Cricket" - 5:24
2. "Typical Stinkin'...." - 3:38
3. "Bit Stuffy in Here" - 2:55
4. "Chappell's to Open" - 4:49
5. "Australian v Pakistan" - 6:59
6. "That's My Pen!" - 3:21
7. "Brekky, and Carbide" - 3:26
8. "How about an Autograph?" - 2:47
9. "Post Hijack" - 11:20
10. "The Lunch" - 5:58
11. "Richie's Big Announcement" - 6:44
12. "The Office Update" - 4:05
13. "Early Perth Flight" - 3:18
14. "Chappelli's Shakespeare " - 2:31
15. "Oh F..k It!" - 4:08
16. "Hotel Check-In" - 8:14
17. "Bill's Nose Job" - 6:22
18. "Tony's Rug Advice" - 5:24
19. "The Wrong Hair Hat!!" - 13:44
20. "England v Sri Lanka" - 4:59
21. "Alan Jones Radio Show" - 4:19
22. "Martin Place Petition" - 3:13
23. "Call the P.M.!!" - 9:35
24. "Marvellous '06 (Horns Up!)" - 6:00
25. "Henri Porte - Les Insects!" - 2:15
26. "Old Fossils / Bormy Ormy" - 5:06

== Charts ==
=== Weekly charts ===
Chart (2015/16)	Peak position
Australian Albums (ARIA)	4

=== Year-end charts ===
Chart (2015)	Position
Australian (ARIA Charts)	20
Australian artist (ARIA Charts)	4

== Certifications ==
Region	Certification	Certified units/sales
Australia (ARIA)	Platinum	70,000^{^}
^{^} Shipments figures based on certification alone.

== Release history ==
Region	Date	Format	Label	Catalogue
Australia	27 November 2015	2x CD; digital download	Little Digger Productions / Universal Music Australia	4767387

== See also ==
- List of top 25 albums for 2015 in Australia
