= The Final Dig? =

Studio album studio by The Twelfth Man
- Released: 3 December 2001
- Recorded: The Loft, Mittagong, November 2001
- Genre: Spoken word, comedy
- Length: 2:26:00
- Label: EMI Music
- Producer: Billy Birmingham, David Frogatt

The Twelfth Man chronology
Bill Lawry... This is Your Life (1997)	The Final Dig? (2001)	Boned! (2006)

The Final Dig? is the sixth album released by The Twelfth Man, released on 3 December 2001 by EMI Music, the album peaked at number one on the Australian ARIA Chart for five-week between December 2001 and January 2002.

At the 2002 ARIA Music Awards of 2002, the album won the ARIA Award for Best Comedy Release.

== Story ==
Richie Benaud decides to retire. Channel 9 Commentary Team Selection Committee has to choose a new Commentary Team Captain for when Richie Benaud retires to his vineyard estate, 'Chateau Verdaflore', in the South of France. In the running for the Captain are all the current commentary team of Bill Lawry, Tony Greig, Mark 'Tubby' Taylor, Ian Healy and Ian Chappell. Richie gives them advice on how they can improve their chances of being picked as commentary team captain. He advises Tony to get a hairpiece (Tony takes Greg Matthews' advice on the matter and buys a wig from Advanced Hair Hats with a ponytail), Bill to get several centimetres of his nose cut off (Bill's nose job results in Richie vomiting at the sight of it) and Ian to take some speaking lessons (Ian shows Richie what he has learnt from the class during a match, which pleases Richie).

There is outside chance on Hansie Cronje and also former Kiwi Captain Martin Crowe. Audition tapes are also sent in by Ray Martin, Mike Munro, Eddie McGuire, Darrell Eastlake, Ray Warren, Molly Meldrum, Max Walker, and Jim Waley.

Kerry Packer then announces that Darrell "HUGGGGE" Eastlake and Max Walker will become the new captains. Richie hates these two, and decides to stay on for another season – just as Kerry planned.

== Track listing ==
CD (5375962)

=== Disc One ===
1. "Scene 1: The Lunch"
2. "Scene 2: Commentary Team Training"
3. "Scene 3: Richie's Office at Channel 9 #1"
4. "Scene 4: Richie's Office at Channel 9 #2"
5. "Scene 5: Australia vs New Zealand (Part One)"
6. "Scene 6: Australia vs New Zealand (Part Two)"
7. "Scene 7: David's Office at Channel 9"
8. "Scene 8: Australia vs New Zealand (Part Three)"
9. "Scene 9: Australia vs New Zealand (Part Four)"

=== Disc Two ===
1. "Scene 10: The Commentators' Office"
2. "Scene 11: The Airport"
3. "Scene 12: On the Plane"
4. "Scene 13: The Hotel Check-In"
5. "Scene 14: David's Home Study"
6. "Scene 15: Australia vs South Africa (Part One)"
7. "Scene 16: Australia vs South Africa (Part Two)"
8. "Scene 17: The Announcement"
9. "Scene 18: Just Brilliant!"

== Charts ==
=== Weekly charts ===
Chart (2001/02)	Peak position
Australian Albums (ARIA)	1
New Zealand Albums (RMNZ)	2

=== Year-end charts ===
Chart (2001)	Position
Australian Albums (ARIA)	29
Chart (2002)	Position
Australian Artist Albums (ARIA)	5
New Zealand Albums (RMNZ)	34

== Certifications ==
Region	Certification	Certified units/sales
Australia (ARIA)	3× Platinum	210,000^{^}
^{^} Shipments figures based on certification alone.

== See also ==
- List of number-one albums of 2001 (Australia)
- List of number-one albums of 2002 (Australia)
- New Zealand top 50 albums of 2002
