= Bruce 2000 =

2000 single by The Twelfth Man

Single by The Twelfth Man

from the album Wired World of Sports (2000 reissue)
- Released: December 2000
- Recorded: 2000
- Genre: Comedy
- Length: 4:46
- Label: EMI Music
- Songwriter(s): Billy Birmingham, Mick Molloy, David Froggatt
- Producer(s): Billy Birmingham

The Twelfth Man singles chronology
"Marvellous!" (1993)	"Bruce 2000" (2000)	"Marvellous! '06" (2006)

"Bruce 2000" (subtitled "A "Special" Tribute By The 12th Man") is a single by The Twelfth Man, a series of comedy productions by skilled impersonator Billy Birmingham. The single is a satirical commentary on Australian sports commentator Bruce McAvaney. The song was released in December 2000 peaked at number 5 on the ARIA Charts.

At the ARIA Music Awards of 2001, the single was nominated for Best Comedy Release, losing to Whatever by Guido Hatzis.

== Background and release ==
During the Sydney 2000 Olympic Games, Birmingham and Mick Molloy broadcast a national radio show on Triple M, covering the Olympics. The show was called "Going for Bronze" and Birmingham would impersonate Bruce MacAvaney for a recurring segment of the show, which involved them noting Bruce was recording in a near-by studio, with Birmingham asking him to open the door to reveal Birmingham doing a one-liner with Bruce's voice. Birmingham pre-recorded these one-liners in the cupboard of the hotel room he stayed at while working on the show. At the completion of the Olympics, Birmingham linked all the Bruce impersonations with background music to create "Bruce 2000", telling people it was a "great way to remember the Sydney Olympics in less than 4 and a half minutes".

== Music video ==
A music video, running for three minutes and forty-two seconds is composed of footage from Seven's coverage of the 2000 Sydney Olympics.

== Track listing ==
CD single (EMI – 724388988322)

1. "Bruce 2000"

== Charts ==
Chart (2000–2001)	Peak position
Australia (ARIA)	5

== Certifications ==
Region	Certification	Certified units/sales
Australia (ARIA)	Gold	35,000^{^}
^{^} Shipments figures based on certification alone.
