= New Zealand top 50 albums of 2002 =

This is the list of the top 50 albums of 2002 in New Zealand

== Summary ==
=== Chart ===
Key
‡ – Album of New Zealand origin

Number	Weeks in Chart	Artist	Album
1	40	Norah Jones	Come Away With Me
2	44	Shakira	Laundry Service
3	29	Eminem	The Eminem Show
4	38	Pink	Missundaztood
5	47	Salmonella Dub	Inside the Dub Plates
6	23	Russell Watson	Encore – The New Zealand Edition
7	29	Celine Dion	A New Day Has Come
8	24	Bic Runga	Beautiful Collision
9	24	Nelly	Nellyville
10	37	Westlife	World of Our Own
11	31	Linkin Park	Hybrid Theory
12	36	Enrique Iglesias	Escape
13	30	Creed	Weathered
14	23	Ja Rule	Pain Is Love
15	23	Red Hot Chili Peppers	By the Way
16	35	Incubus	Morning View
17	30	Blue	All Rise
18	32	Anika Moa	Thinking Room
19	34	System of a Down	Toxicity
20	30	Sophie Ellis-Bextor	Read My Lips: Revised Edition
21	27	Goodshirt	Good: Bonus DVD Edition
22	18	Little River Band	Greatest Hits
23	24	Groove Armada	Goodbye Country (Hello Nightclub)
24	15	Avril Lavigne	Let Go
25	?	Che Fu	Navigator
26	21	Prince Tui Teka	The Greatest
27	19	Ronan Keating	Destination
28	28	Alicia Keys	Songs in A Minor
29	18	Nickelback	Silver Side Up
30	38	Kylie Minogue	Fever
31	18	Moby	18
32	18	Bee Gees	The Record
33	17	Jennifer Lopez	J to tha L-O!: The Remixes
34	16	The 12th Man	The Final Dig?
35	20	Josh Groban	Josh Groban
36	15	Neil Diamond	The Essential Neil Diamond
37	16	Barbra Streisand	The Essential Barbra Streisand
38	16	Robbie Williams	Swing When You're Winning
39	13	Nat King Cole	Unforgettable
40	11	The Rolling Stones	Forty Licks
41	12	Elvis Presley	Elvis 30#1 Hits
42	14	Lulu	Together
43	15	Coldplay	A Rush of Blood to the Head
44	13	Linkin Park	Reanimation
45	14	Pacifier	Pacifier
46	21	P.O.D.	Satellite Limited Edition
47	26	The Feelers	Communicate
48	13	Chemical Brothers	Come With Us
49	12	Herbs	Listen: The Very Best Of
50	16	Creedence Clearwater Revival	Anniversary Edition
