= Marvellous! =

1992 single by the Twelfth Man

Single by The Twelfth Man featuring M.C.G. Hammer

from the album Still the 12th Man
- Released: March 1992
- Genre: Dance-pop
- Length: 6:23
- Label: EMI Music
- Songwriters: Billy Birmingham, David Froggatt
- Producer: Billy Birmingham

The Twelfth Man featuring M.C.G. Hammer singles chronology
"It's Just Not Cricket" (1984)	"Marvellous!" (1992)	"Bruce 2000" (2000)

"Marvellous!" is a single by The Twelfth Man, a series of comedy productions by impersonator Billy Birmingham. He is credited as a featured artist, "M.C.G. Hammer", for the single. "Marvellous!" peaked at No. 1 on the Australian ARIA Singles Chart in April 1992. In response to the single's release, Richie Benaud tried replacing his titular catchphrase, which the song is themed around with "glorious!". However, this did not stop it from reaching number one. Birmingham later re-recorded the track for his 2006 album Boned!.

== Track listing ==
CD single (EMI – 4360152)

1. "Marvellous!" – 6:23
2. "Marvellous!" (karaoke instrumental mix) – 6:21

== Personnel ==
The personnel for the backing vocals, credited as The First XI Choir, are listed in the style of the batting lineup of a cricket team. In order of listing on the album sleeve:

- J.D. Barnes
- G.L. Bidstrup
- A. P. Brock
- M.J.D. Callaghan
- D.I. Esel
- J.P. Farnham
- D.L. Froggatt (Vice Capt.)
- J.C. Neill
- G.B. Shorrock
- D.A.J. Steel
- W.R. Birmingham (12th Man, Capt.)

Lead vocals were by Birmingham, credited as "M.C.G. Hammer", a portmanteau of MCG and MC Hammer. "D.I. Esel" also played guitar on the track.

== Charts ==
=== Weekly charts ===
Chart (1992)	Peak position
Australia (ARIA)	1

=== Year-end charts ===
Chart (1992)	Position
Australia (ARIA)	47

== Certifications ==
Region	Certification	Certified units/sales
Australia (ARIA)	Gold	35,000^{^}
^{^} Shipments figures based on certification alone.

== See also ==
- List of number-one singles in Australia during the 1990s
