= Bits and pieces =

Bits and pieces may refer to:

- Bits and pieces, a mosaic technique better known as trencadís
- Bits and Pieces (album) a 2004 album by Scared Weird Little Guys
- Bits and Pieces (1985 film), a horror film released in 1985
- Bits and Pieces (1996 film), an Italian comedy-drama film directed by Antonello Grimaldi
- "Bits and Pieces" (song), a song by 1960s quintet The Dave Clark Five
- Bits and Pieces (TV series), a proposed TV series by Liv and Maddie
