= List of top 25 albums for 1993 in Australia =

Top 25 albums of 1993 < 1992 1994 >

Other Australian top charts for 1993
- top 25 singles
- Triple J Hottest 100

Australian number-one charts of 1993
- albums
- singles

These are the top 50 albums of 1993 in Australia from the Australian Recording Industry Association (ARIA) End of Year Albums Chart.

#	Title	Artist	Highest pos. reached	Weeks at No. 1
1.	The Bodyguard: Original Soundtrack Album	Soundtrack / Whitney Houston	1	5
2.	Unplugged	Eric Clapton	1	8
3.	Bat Out of Hell II: Back into Hell	Meat Loaf	1	5
4.	Breathless	Kenny G	1	1
5.	A Touch of Music in the Night	Michael Crawford	1	2
6.	So Far So Good	Bryan Adams	1	12 (Note: So Far So Good debuted at #1 on the ARIA album charts in November 1993 and spent four weeks at the top in 1993. It remained at #1 in early 1994 for a further eight weeks, achieving a total of twelve weeks at the top. It left the Top 50 album chart in May 1994, returned in November 1994 and spent a total of 31 weeks in the Top 50.)
7.	River of Dreams	Billy Joel	1	4
8.	Then Again...	John Farnham	1	1
9.	Zooropa	U2	1	4
10.	Keep the Faith	Bon Jovi	2	
11.	Are You Gonna Go My Way	Lenny Kravitz	1	4
12.	Bat Out of Hell	Meat Loaf	1	8 (Note: Bat out of Hell peaked at #1 on the Kent Music Report for Australian albums in June 1978 for eight weeks. It entered the ARIA Top 50 album chart in February 1991 and peaked at #4. It re-entered the Top 50 in August 1993 and again peaked at #4. It charted again in 2004, 2006 and 2007; it has spent a total of 64 weeks in the Top 50.)
13.	Sonia Dada	Sonia Dada	2	
14.	America's Least Wanted	Ugly Kid Joe	7	
15.	Heat	Jimmy Barnes	2	
16.	Duets	Frank Sinatra	2	
17.	Pocket Full of Kryptonite	Spin Doctors	1	2
18.	Deep Forest	Deep Forest	4	
19.	3 Years, 5 Months and 2 Days in the Life Of...	Arrested Development	4	
20.	The Immaculate Collection	Madonna	1	5 (Note: The Immaculate Collection peaked at #1 in December 1990 on the ARIA chart for three weeks, it returned to #1 for two weeks in mid-January 1991 and was still in the Top 50 until November. It returned to the Top 50 in 1992, 1993 (peaking at #6), 1994 and 1995. It has spent a total of 93 weeks in the Top 50.)
21.	The Silver Jubilee Album	The Seekers	3	
22.	Automatic for the People	R.E.M.	2	
23.	Still the 12th Man	The Twelfth Man	1	3
24.	Cooleyhighharmony	Boyz II Men	4	
25.	janet.	Janet Jackson	1	4 (Note: janet. debuted at #1 in June 1993 on the ARIA chart for three weeks. It returned to the Top 50 during 1994, and again in 1995 when it peaked at #1 for one week. It has spent a total of four weeks at #1 and 50 weeks in the Top 50.)
26.	Lily	Wendy Matthews	2	
27.	Dangerous	Michael Jackson	1	4
28.	Experience the Divine: Greatest Hits	Bette Midler	3	
29.	"The Spaghetti Incident?"	Guns N' Roses	1	1
30.	Led Zeppelin Remasters	Led Zeppelin	1	1
31.	Metallica	Metallica	1	1
32.	The Best of the Doors	The Doors	3	
33.	Music Box	Mariah Carey	1	18
34.	Flesh and Wood	Jimmy Barnes	2	
35.	Unplugged...and Seated	Rod Stewart	4	
36.	Earth and Sun and Moon	Midnight Oil	2	
37.	The Ultimate Experience	Jimi Hendrix	7	
38.	Sleepless in Seattle	Soundtrack	3	
39.	Vs.	Pearl Jam	1	1
40.	The Honeymoon Is Over	The Cruel Sea	4	
41.	The Chosen Ones – Greatest Hits	The Black Sorrows	4	
42.	The Best of Van Morrison	Van Morrison	1	3
43.	Sister Act	Soundtrack	8	
44.	Company of Strangers	Company of Strangers	9	
45.	Heaven Knows	Rick Price	3	
46.	The Singles Collection 1981–1993	Kim Wilde	6	
47.	Very	Pet Shop Boys	2	
48.	Bigger, Better, Faster, More!	4 Non Blondes	4	
49.	Erotica	Madonna	1	2
50.	Timeless: The Classics	Michael Bolton	2	

Peak chart positions from 1993 are from the ARIA Charts, overall position on the End of Year Chart is calculated by ARIA based on the number of weeks and position that the records reach within the Top 50 albums for each week during 1993.
