= Still the 12th Man =

Studio album by The Twelfth Man
- Released: December 1992
- Recorded: Burradoo House, November 1992
- Genre: Spoken word, comedy
- Length: 66:04
- Label: EMI Music
- Producer: Billy Birmingham, David Froggatt

The Twelfth Man chronology
The 12th Man Again (1990)	Still the 12th Man (1992)	Wired World of Sports II (1994)

Still the 12th Man is the third album released by The Twelfth Man. Released in December 1992, the album reached number one on the ARIA Charts in January 1993.

At the ARIA Music Awards of 1993, the album was nominated for Best Comedy Release.

== Plot ==
A day in the life of Richie Benaud, the "captain" of the Channel 9 cricket commentary team. Resembling a game between Australia and Pakistan, this album includes Bruce Reid literally falling apart, Tony Greig and Bill Lawry hijacking the commentary box and Max Walker streaking and hijacking the commentary box. In fact, it gets so bad for Richie that he has to leave early.

The album also contains the number one single, "Marvellous!".

== Track listing ==
CD (8141392)

1. "Still the 12th Man" - 57:52
2. "Marvellous!" - 8:12

== Charts ==
=== Weekly charts ===
Chart (1992/93)	Peak position
Australian Albums (ARIA)	1
New Zealand Albums (RMNZ)	21

=== Year-end charts ===
Chart (1993)	Position
Australian (ARIA Charts)	23

== Certifications ==
Region	Certification	Certified units/sales
Australia (ARIA)	3× Platinum	210,000^{^}
^{^} Shipments figures based on certification alone.

== See also ==
- List of number-one albums of 1993 (Australia)
- List of Top 25 albums for 1993 in Australia
