= List of top 25 albums for 1994 in Australia =

Top 25 albums of 1994 < 1993 1995 >

Other Australian top charts for 1994
- top 25 singles
- Triple J Hottest 100

Australian number-one charts of 1994
- albums
- singles

These are the top 50 albums of 1994 in Australia from the Australian Recording Industry Association (ARIA) End of Year Albums Chart.

#	Title	Artist	Highest pos. reached	Weeks at No. 1
1.	Music Box	Mariah Carey	1	18 (Note: Music Box entered the ARIA album charts in October 1993 and peaked at #1 on the ARIA album charts in March 1994 and spent a total of 18 weeks at the top in 1994. It left the Top 50 album chart in March 1995 and spent a total of 72 weeks in the Top 50.)
2.	So Far So Good	Bryan Adams	1	12 (Note: So Far So Good debuted at #1 on the ARIA album charts in November 1993 and spent four weeks at the top in 1993. It remained at #1 in early 1994 for a further eight weeks, achieving a total of twelve weeks at the top. It left the Top 50 album chart in May 1994, returned in November 1994 and spent a total of 31 weeks in the Top 50.)
3.	Cross Road: Greatest Hits	Bon Jovi	1	2 (Note: Cross Road debuted at #1 on the ARIA album charts in October 1994 for two weeks. It left the Top 50 album chart in April 1995, returned in June and October 1995, returned again in 2005 and 2007. It has spent a total of 38 weeks in the Top 50.)
4.	Priscilla, Queen of the Desert	Soundtrack	1	4
5.	The Very Best of the Eagles	The Eagles	2	
6.	The Lion King	Soundtrack	3	
7.	MTV Unplugged in New York	Nirvana	1	3 (Note: MTV Unplugged in New York debuted at #1 on the ARIA album charts in November 1994 for three weeks. It left the Top 50 album chart in July 1995, returned later in 1995, and again in 1996. It has spent a total of 56 weeks in the Top 50.)
8.	Wired World of Sports II	The Twelfth Man	1	3
9.	ABBA Gold: Greatest Hits	ABBA	1	4 (Note: ABBA Gold: Greatest Hits peaked at #1 in December 1992 for four weeks. It left the Top 50 album chart in April 1993. It returned to the Top 50 in October 1994 peaking at #3 in December. Returned in May 1999 and peaked at #2 in June. Returned in July 2008 and peaked at #4. As of February 2009, it was still in the Top 50 and has spent a total of 109 weeks there.)
10.	Forrest Gump	Soundtrack	1	3 (Note: Forrest Gump entered the ARIA album charts in November 1994 and peaked at #1 for two weeks in December. It returned to #1 for one week in January 1995 and left the Top 50 album chart in June 1995, returned later in 1995, and again in late 1997 to early 1998. It has spent a total of 52 weeks in the Top 50.)
11.	Merry Christmas	Mariah Carey	2	
12.	Vitalogy	Pearl Jam	1	1 (Note: Vitalogy debuted at #1 on the ARIA Top 50 album chart in mid-December 1994 for one week. It remained in the charts until July 1995 and spent a total of 30 weeks in the Top 50.)
13.	The One Thing	Michael Bolton	1	2
14.	II	Boyz II Men	4	
15.	In Pieces	Garth Brooks	1	1
16.	Get on Board	The Badloves	5	
17.	The Three Tenors in Concert 1994	The Three Tenors	1	1
18.	End of Part One: Their Greatest Hits	Wet Wet Wet	2	
19.	The Division Bell	Pink Floyd	1	3
20.	Superunknown	Soundgarden	1	1
21.	Flesh and Wood	Jimmy Barnes	2	
22.	The Greatest Hits	INXS	2	
23.	She	Harry Connick, Jr.	2	
24.	Vs.	Pearl Jam	1	1 (Note: Vs. debuted at #1 in late October 1993 on the ARIA chart for one week and remained in the Top 50 until November 1994. It returned to the Top 50 during 1995 and has spent a total of 68 weeks in the Top 50.)
25.	No Need to Argue	The Cranberries	1	1 (Note: No Need to Argue entered the ARIA chart in November 1994 and peaked at #1 in January 1995 for one week. It remained in the charts until October 1995, returned in November and again in 1996, it has spent a total of 54 weeks in the Top 50.)
26.	River of Dreams	Billy Joel	1	4
27.	Then Again... And More	John Farnham	1	1
28.	Zooropa	U2	1	4
29.	August and Everything After	Counting Crows	12	
30.	Ingénue	k.d. lang	3	
31.	Reality Bites	Soundtrack	2	
32.	Happy Nation	Ace of Base	9	
33.	The Cross of Changes	Enigma	2	
34.	Chocolate Starfish	Chocolate Starfish	2	
35.	Four Weddings and a Funeral	Soundtrack	4	
36.	Bedtime Stories	Madonna	1	1
37.	Walthamstow	East 17	5	
38.	God Shuffled His Feet	Crash Test Dummies	5	
39.	The Honeymoon Is Over	The Cruel Sea	4	
40.	Live at the BBC	The Beatles	2	
41.	Even Cowgirls Get the Blues	k.d. lang	10	
42.	Bat Out of Hell II: Back into Hell	Meat Loaf	1	4
43.	Experience the Divine: Greatest Hits	Bette Midler	3	
44.	Tear of Thought	The Screaming Jets	3	
45.	Very Necessary	Salt-N-Pepa	5	
46.	Monster	R.E.M.	2	
47.	Siamese Dream	The Smashing Pumpkins	7	
48.	The Colour of My Love	Celine Dion	1	8
49.	Legend	Bob Marley and the Wailers	14	
50.	The Chosen Ones – Greatest Hits	The Black Sorrows	4	

Peak chart positions are from the ARIA Charts, overall position on the End of Year Chart is calculated by ARIA based on the number of weeks and position that the records reach within the Top 50 albums for each week during 1994.
