= The 12th Man Again =

The 12th Man Again!

Studio album by The Twelfth Man
- Released: February 1990
- Recorded: 1989/1990
- Genre: Spoken word, comedy
- Length: 38:30
- Label: EMI Music
- Producer: Billy Birmingham, David Froggatt

The Twelfth Man chronology
Wired World of Sports (1987)	The 12th Man Again! (1990)	Still the 12th Man (1992)

The 12th Man Again is the second album released by The Twelfth Man. Released in February 1990, it reached number one on the ARIA Charts in March 1990.

At the ARIA Music Awards of 1991, the album was nominated for Best Comedy Release, losing to Great Interviews of the 20th Century by John Clarke and Bryan Dawe.

== Plot ==
The Network Nine cricket commentary team, featuring the captain Richie Benaud, Bill Lawry, Tony Greig, Ian Chappell, Rod Marsh and Max Walker are at the MCG commentating the one-day match between Australia and Sri Lanka as part of the Benson & Hedges World Series Cup. The Sri Lankans are getting smashed in the match, Bill Lawry, an avid Victorian, loses his marbles when Merv Hughes, a fellow Victorian, claims a hat-trick and has to leave the commentary box. Merv Hughes also sticks his tongue down Allan Border's throat when the ball gets lodged in there.

== Track listing ==
CD (CDP 794117)

1. "The 12th Man Again!" - 38:33

== Charts ==
=== Weekly charts ===
Chart (1990)	Peak position
Australian Albums (ARIA)	1

=== Year-end charts ===
Chart (1990)	Position
Australian (ARIA Charts)	28

== Certifications ==
Region	Certification	Certified units/sales
Australia (ARIA)	Platinum	70,000^{^}
^{^} Shipments figures based on certification alone.

== See also ==
- List of number-one albums of 1990 (Australia)
