= Bits and Pieces (album) =

Compilation album by Scared Weird Little Guys
- Released: May 2004
- Recorded: 2002–2004
- Genre: Comedy
- Label: Shock Records

Scared Weird Little Guys chronology
Live at 42 Walnut Crescent (2000)	Bits and Pieces (2004)	Scared Weird Little Songs (2009)

Bits and Pieces is the fifth compilation of material from comedy duo Scared Weird Little Guys. The album was released in May 2004.

At the ARIA Music Awards of 2004 the album won the ARIA Award for Best Comedy Release.

== Track listing ==
1. "Cleanin' Out My Tuckerbag" – 2:19
2. "South Australia" – 2:43
3. "Am I Ever Going To See Your Face Again? (In the Style of Advance Australia Fair)" – 0:44
4. "Loved You Better" – 2:40
5. "Staying Alive (As Sung By a Welsh Male Voice Choir) " – 1:04
6. "Your Face" – 3:00
7. "Rock n Roll All Night (As Sung By a Barbershop Quartet)" – 0:51
8. "Born in the USA (In The Style Of Austrian Tyroler Music)" – 0:27
9. "Morse Code Song" – 0:59
10. "Whistle Pops" – 3:23
11. "Queensland" – 2:38
12. "Our Cathy" – 2:01
13. "Governor General" – 2:28
14. "Still Can't Find Saddam" – 2:10
15. "Waugh Song" – 2:10
16. "Wimbledon" – 2:01
17. "World Leaders" – 1:56
18. "Sex and Drugs and Leg Spin Bowl" – 2:14
19. "Australian of he Year" – 2:32
20. "Underwear Song" – 2:24
21. "Springtime's Here Again (2003)" – 3:36
22. "Seven Topics In One Song" – 3:47
23. "Cleanin' Out My Tuckerbag (Radio Friendly Version)" – 2:19
