= Chris Warren (rugby league) =

Australian rugby league footballer

Personal information
- Full name: Christopher Warren
- Born: 1 September 1970 (age 56) Sydney, New South Wales, Australia

Playing information
- Position: Hooker
Club
Years	Team	Pld	T	G	FG	P
1990–92	Western Suburbs	5	1	0	0	4
- Source: As of 29 March 2010
- Education: Parramatta Marist High School
- Father: Ray Warren

Chris Warren (born 1 September 1970) is an Australian television presenter/producer and former professional rugby league footballer. He is a son of sports commentator Ray Warren.

== Early years ==
Warren was born in Sydney, attended Marist Brothers Parramatta and later earned a Bachelor of Commerce with a major in marketing.

== Playing career ==
Warren was a Parramatta junior and played in their winning SG Ball side of 1986. He also captained NSW CCC at under-15 and Open ages but missed out on making the Australian Schoolboys side in 1988, although he did win the Commonwealth Bank Cup with Parramatta Marist. Warren played seven seasons in the NSWRL and ARL after making his debut for Western Suburbs Magpies in 1990. He was a foundation member of the Western Reds squad in 1995 but did not make any first-grade appearances. He retired from playing in 1997 and joined Tennis West as their Marketing Manager before heading to the UK in 1998.

== Television and radio career ==
Warren left Australia to join satellite television channel Sky Sports' Rugby league team in the United Kingdom in February 1999 as a presenter; he was the regular host of the channel's live coverage of Australia's National Rugby League and State of Origin series. Warren also occasionally presented the channel's rugby league magazine show Boots 'n' All and served as a sideline reporter at international matches.

Warren combined his presenting duties with a public announcing/match day programme editor and marketing role at Super League club London Broncos until the end of 2006, when Sky Sports lost the UK rights to show Australian rugby league action to rival UK satellite sports channel Setanta Sports. He vacated his position at Harlequins when he joined Setanta although he returns to the club on most match-days as the MC.

Warren joined Setanta as a producer in April 2007, overseeing their NRL & AFL content. He was also a Presenter on Setanta Sports News, a rival to Sky Sports News which was produced by ITN.

Warren joined IMG in April 2008 as its Rugby League Media Manager.

After the collapse of Setanta Sports in July 2009, Warren joined ESPN as a freelance producer, overseeing the production of their AFL and NRL programming.

In June 2010 Warren started presenting on Fox Sports News, Australia. In 2011 Chris was also the sideline reporter for Fox Sports Rugby League coverage. Chris does sideline commentary for the 2GB Rugby League Continuous Call team.

Warren became the new Host of Fox Sports NRL Summertime in 2012/13. He left Fox Sports in July 2013.

Warren joined Radio 2GB as its sports news reporter for the Alan Jones Breakfast Show in January 2014 through to December 2020.

He has been calling NRL games for the 2GB Continuous Call Team since 2014.

Joined new Sydney Sports Radio station SEN 1170 as a presenter in December 2020.

== See also ==
- Warren leaves Harlequins – from www.quins.co.uk
