= ARIA Award for Best Comedy Release =

Former Australian music award

- Country: Australia
- Presented by: Australian Recording Industry Association (ARIA)
- First award: 1987
- Final award: 2020
- Currently held by: Anne Edmonds, What's Wrong with You (2020)

Highlights
- Most wins: John Clarke, Martin/Molloy and the Twelfth Man (3 each)
- Most nominations: Rodney Rude (9)
- Website: ariaawards.com.au

The ARIA Music Award for Best Comedy Release was an award presented at the annual ARIA Music Awards, which recognised "the many achievements of Aussie artists across all music genres", from 1987 until 2020. It was handed out by the Australian Recording Industry Association (ARIA), an organisation whose aim is "to advance the interests of the Australian record industry."

John Clarke, Martin/Molloy and the Twelfth Man were tied for the most wins with three each, with Clarke's final win in 2017 being posthumous and Martin/Molloy winning all their nominations, including consecutive wins in 1996 and 1997. Rodney Rude received the most nominations with nine, though he never won. Three other acts won both their nominations; Tom Ballard (as one half of a duo with Alex Dyson and collaborating with Bridie and Wyatt), Hamish & Andy and Guido Hatzis, the only other act to win in consecutive years (2000 and 2001). Tripod were the only act nominated for two releases in the same year, as both About an Hour of Song in an Hour...Again and Live - Fegh Maha were nominated in 2004.

== Winners and nominees ==
In the following table, the winner is highlighted in a separate colour, and in boldface; the nominees are those that are not highlighted or in boldface.

Winner marked in a separate colour

Year	Winner(s)	Album/single title
**1987** (1st)
**1987** (1st)	**Kevin "Bloody" Wilson**	**Kev's Back**
**1987** (1st)	Austen Tayshus	"Do the Pope"
**1987** (1st)	Mary Kenneally and Steve Blackburn	Australia You're Standing In It
**1987** (1st)	Rodney Rude	Rude Rides Again
**1987** (1st)	Vince Sorrenti	Unbelievable
**1988** (2nd)	**The 12th Man**	**Wired World of Sports**
**1988** (2nd)	Garry Who	"Life's Just a Routine"
**1989** (3rd)	**The Comedy Company**	**The Comedy Company Album**
**1989** (3rd)	Austen Tayshus	"Highway Corroboree"
**1989** (3rd)	Club Veg	Members & Guests & Things
**1989** (3rd)	Con the Fruiterer	"A Cuppla Days"
**1989** (3rd)	Kylie Mole	"So Excellent" / "I Go I Go"
**1989** (3rd)	Rodney Rude	Not Guilty
**1990** (4th)
**1990** (4th)	**The D-Generation**	**The Satanic Sketches**
**1990** (4th)	The Comedy Company	Comedy Company Classics
**1990** (4th)	Fast Forward	Fast Forward - Take One
**1990** (4th)	Kevin Bloody Wilson	My Australian Roots
**1990** (4th)	Roy Slaven	Rampaging Roy... The Life and Times of Roy Slaven
**1991** (5th)
**1991** (5th)	**John Clarke** and **Bryan Dawe**	**Great Interviews of the Twentieth Century**
**1991** (5th)	The 12th Man	The 12th Man Again
**1991** (5th)	The D-Generation	The Breakfast Tapes
**1991** (5th)	Doug Anthony All Stars	Icon
**1991** (5th)	HG Nelson & Roy Slaven	Wicket to Wicket
**1992** (6th)
**1992** (6th)	**John Clarke** and **Bryan Dawe**	**The Annual Report**
**1992** (6th)	Agro	Agro Too
**1992** (6th)	Rodney Rude	A Legend
**1992** (6th)	Rubbery Figures	"Recession Rap"
**1992** (6th)	Kevin Bloody Wilson	Let's Call Him Kev
**1993** (7th)
**1993** (7th)	**Various**	**Stairways to Heaven**
**1993** (7th)	The 12th Man	Still the 12th Man
**1993** (7th)	Agro	Agro Kids Dance Album
**1993** (7th)	Andrew Denton and the Cast of Live & Sweaty	"I Don't Care As Long As We Beat New Zealand"
**1993** (7th)	Norman Gunston featuring Effie	"Amigos Para Siempre" / "Venereal Girl (Tribute to Madonna)"
**1994** (8th)
**1994** (8th)	**Steady Eddy**	**Ready Steady Go**
**1994** (8th)	Rolf Harris	Rolf Rules OK
**1994** (8th)	Jimeoin	Goin' Off
**1994** (8th)	Doug Mulray	Nice Legs Shame About the Fez
**1994** (8th)	Double Take	Hercules Returns
**1995** (9th)
**1995** (9th)	**The 12th Man**	**Wired World of Sports II**
**1995** (9th)	Austen Tayshus	Alive and Schticking
**1995** (9th)	Jimeoin	Crack
**1995** (9th)	Kevin Bloody Wilson	Let Loose Live in London
**1995** (9th)	Scared Weird Little Guys	Scared
**1996** (10th)
**1996** (10th)	**Martin/Molloy**	**The Brown Album**
**1996** (10th)	Austen Tayshus	I'm Jacques Chirac
**1996** (10th)	Bucko & Champs	Aussie Christmas
**1996** (10th)	Silverpram	Frogstamp
**1996** (10th)	The Vaughans	"Who Farted?"
**1997** (11th)
**1997** (11th)	**Martin/Molloy**	**Poop Chute**
**1997** (11th)	Bob Downe	Jazzy!
**1997** (11th)	Elle McFeast	Breasts
**1997** (11th)	Ian Turpie	Talk of the Town
**1997** (11th)	John Clarke & Bryan Dawe	Secret Men's Business
**1998** (12th)
**1998** (12th)	**Paul McDermott**	**Unplugged Good News Week Tapes Volume 1**
**1998** (12th)	The 12th Man	Bill Lawry... This Is Your Life
**1998** (12th)	Jimeoin	Forklift Truck
**1998** (12th)	John Safran	"Not the Sunscreen Song"
**1998** (12th)	The Squirrel Grippers	Nine Inch Males
**1999** (13th)
**1999** (13th)	**Martin/Molloy**	**Eat Your Peas**
**1999** (13th)	Judith Lucy	King of the Road
**1999** (13th)	Merrick and Rosso	Teenage Mullet Fury
**1999** (13th)	Pauline Pantsdown	"I Don't Like It"
**1999** (13th)	Rodney Rude	More Grunt
**2000** (14th)
**2000** (14th)	**Guido Hatzis**	**Do Not Talk Over Me**
**2000** (14th)	Greg Champion	Stand Back Australia
**2000** (14th)	Club Veg	We Suck - The Best of Sucked In Calls
**2000** (14th)	Chris Franklin	"Bloke"
**2000** (14th)	Elliot Goblet	Internally Berserk
**2001** (15th)
**2001** (15th)	**Guido Hatzis**	**Whatever...**
**2001** (15th)	The 12th Man	"Bruce 2000"
**2001** (15th)	Chris Franklin	"Mullet Head"
**2001** (15th)	The Drugs	The Only Way Is Up
**2001** (15th)	Rodney Rude	Ya Mum's Bum
**2002** (16th)
**2002** (16th)	**The 12th Man**	**The Final Dig?**
**2002** (16th)	The Drugs	The Bold and the Beautiful
**2002** (16th)	Kevin Bloody Wilson	The Second Kumin' of Kev
**2002** (16th)	Sam Kekovich	You Know It Makes Sense
**2002** (16th)	The Umbilical Brothers	"Don't Dance to This"
**2003** (17th)
**2003** (17th)	**Merrick and Rosso**	**From Us to Youse**
**2003** (17th)	Dave Hughes	Whatever
**2003** (17th)	The Drugs	Music's in Trouble
**2003** (17th)	Rodney Rude	Rude Bastard
**2003** (17th)	Tripod	About an Hour of Song in an Hour
**2004** (18th)
**2004** (18th)	**Scared Weird Little Guys**	**Bits and Pieces**
**2004** (18th)	Lee Perry & Gary Eck	The Hollywood Motel
**2004** (18th)	Reg Reagan	Am I Ever Gonna See the Biff Again?
**2004** (18th)	Tripod	About an Hour of Song in an Hour...Again
**2004** (18th)	Tripod	Live - Fegh Maha
**2005** (19th)
**2005** (19th)	**Tripod**	**Middleborough Rd**
**2005** (19th)	Jimeoin	Third Drawer Down
**2005** (19th)	Rodney Rude	Twice As Rude
**2005** (19th)	Shane Dundas & Dave Collins	The Umbilical Brothers
**2005** (19th)	Various	Classic Skithouse
**2006** (20th)
**2006** (20th)	**Lano and Woodley**	**Sing Songs**
**2006** (20th)	Carl Barron	Whatever Comes Next DVD
**2006** (20th)	Matt Tilley	Cereal Pest
**2006** (20th)	The Shambles	Best of Series One & Two
**2007** (21st)
**2007** (21st)	**Dave Hughes**	**Live**
**2007** (21st)	Lano and Woodley	Goodbye
**2007** (21st)	Rodney Rude	Frog Sack
**2007** (21st)	The Twelfth Man	Boned!
**2007** (21st)	Tripod	Songs from Self Saucing
**2008** (22nd)
**2008** (22nd)	**Shaun Micallef**	**The Expurgated Micallef Tonight**
**2008** (22nd)	Akmal Saleh	Akmal Live and Uncensored
**2008** (22nd)	Matt Tilley	Cereal Pest: Gotcha Calls - Three's a Crowd
**2008** (22nd)	Merrick and Rosso	Live and Totally Wrong!
**2008** (22nd)	The Umbilical Brothers	Don't Explain
**2009** (23rd)
**2009** (23rd)	**Hamish & Andy**	**Unessential Listening**
**2009** (23rd)	Dave Hughes	Dave Hughes Is Handy
**2009** (23rd)	Rodney Rude	Rodney Rude Goes the Growl
**2009** (23rd)	The BBQ Kings (Pat Drummond, Tony Williams & Chris O'Leary)	The Fellowship of the Grill
**2009** (23rd)	Tripod	For the Love of God!
**2010** (24th)
**2010** (24th)	**Andrew Hansen, Chris Taylor** and **Craig Shuftan**	**The Blow Parade**
**2010** (24th)	Arj Barker	Arj Barker Forever
**2010** (24th)	Heath Franklin	Heath Franklin's Chopper: Make Deadsh*ts History
**2010** (24th)	Jimeoin	Jimeoin on Ice Live
**2010** (24th)	The Bedroom Philosopher	Songs from the 86 Tram
**2011** (25th)
**2011** (25th)	**Hamish & Andy**	**Celebrating 50 Glorious Years**
**2011** (25th)	Adam Hills	Inflatable
**2011** (25th)	Buddy Goode	The One and Only Buddy Goode
**2011** (25th)	Josh Thomas	Josh Thomas Surprise Warehouse Comedy Festival
**2011** (25th)	Tim Minchin	Tim Minchin & the Heritage Orchestra
**2012** (26th)
**2012** (26th)	**Buddy Goode**	**Unappropriate**
**2012** (26th)	Anthony Salame	Is This thing On?
**2012** (26th)	Arj Barker	Joy Harvest
**2012** (26th)	Sammy J	Skinny Man, Modern World
**2012** (26th)	The Beards	Having a Beard is the New Not Having a Beard
**2013** (27th)
**2013** (27th)	**Tom** and **Alex**	**The Bits We're Least Ashamed of**
**2013** (27th)	Colin Buchanan	The TGIF Songs of Colin Buchanan
**2013** (27th)	Housos	Live
**2013** (27th)	Sammy J and Randy	Bin Night
**2013** (27th)	Pauly Fenech	Pauly's Shorts
**2014** (28th)
**2014** (28th)	**Buddy Goode**	**It's a Buddy Goode Christmas**
**2014** (28th)	Franky Walnut	The Franky Walnut Reflective Drink Coaster
**2014** (28th)	Ja'mie (Chris Lilley)	"Learning to Be Me"
**2014** (28th)	Ronny Chieng	The Ron Way
**2014** (28th)	The Beards	The Beard Album
**2015** (29th)
**2015** (29th)	**Matt Okine**	**Live at the Enmore Theatre**
**2015** (29th)	Bondi Hipsters	"Fuhck the Bahnks"
**2015** (29th)	Buddy Goode	Songs to Ruin Every Occasion
**2015** (29th)	Ronny Chieng	Chieng Reaction
**2015** (29th)	Sammy J & Randy	Live
**2016** (30th)
**2016** (30th)	**Roy & HG**	**This Sporting Life**
**2016** (30th)	Kate Miller-Heidke	"I'm Growing a Beard Downstairs for Christmas" (feat. The Beards)
**2016** (30th)	Luke Heggie	You're Not Special/Anythink is Possible
**2016** (30th)	Matt & Alex	Play It Out
**2017** (31st)
**2017** (31st)	**John Clarke**	**Clarke's Classics**
**2017** (31st)	Arj Barker	Get In My Head
**2017** (31st)	Buddy Goode	More Rubbish
**2017** (31st)	Kitty Flanagan	Seriously?
**2017** (31st)	Rhys Nicholson	Rhys Nicholson Live at The Eternity Playhouse
**2018** (32nd)
**2018** (32nd)	**Bridie and Wyatt (with Tom Ballard)**	**Sex Pest**
**2018** (32nd)	Akmal Saleh	Transparent
**2018** (32nd)	Aunty Donna	Aunty Donna The Album
**2018** (32nd)	Lawrence Mooney	Moonman
**2018** (32nd)	Luke Heggie	Tiprat
**2019** (33rd)
**2019** (33rd)	**Arj Barker**	**Organic**
**2019** (33rd)	Carl Barron	Drinking with a Fork
**2019** (33rd)	Chris Lilley	Lunatics (Official Soundtrack)
**2019** (33rd)	Sammy J	Symphony in J Minor
**2019** (33rd)	Veronica and Lewis	Sex Flex: A Rap Guide to Fornication
**2020** (34th)
**2020** (34th)	**Anne Edmonds**	**What's Wrong with You**
**2020** (34th)	Bev Killick	Crummy Mummy
**2020** (34th)	Celia Pacquola	All Talk
**2020** (34th)	Megan Washington	"Just Jesus" (featuring Chris Ryan)
**2020** (34th)	Tom Gleeson	Joy

== Artists with multiple wins ==
4 wins

- Martin/Molloy (Note: Including one for The D-Generation.)

3 wins

- John Clarke
- The Twelfth Man

2 wins

- Tom Ballard
- Bryan Dawe
- Buddy Goode
- Hamish & Andy
- Guido Hatzis

== Artists with multiple nominations ==
9 nominations

- Rodney Rude

8 nominations

- The Twelfth Man

6 nominations

- Tripod

5 nominations

- Buddy Goode
- Jimeoin
- Martin/Molloy (Note: Including two for The D-Generation.)
- Kevin Bloody Wilson

4 nominations

- Arj Barker
- John Clarke
- Sammy J
- Austen Tayshus

3 nominations

- Tom Ballard
- The Beards
- Con the Fruiterer (Note: Including two for The Comedy Company.)
- Bryan Dawe
- The Drugs
- Dave Hughes
- Merrick and Rosso
- Kylie Mole
- Roy Slaven (Note: Including two as a member of Roy and HG.)
- The Umbilical Brothers

2 nominations

- Agro
- Carl Barron
- Colin Buchanan
- Greg Champion
- Ronny Chieng
- Club Veg
- The Comedy Company
- The D-Generation
- Doug Anthony All Stars (Note: Including the various artists album Stairways to Heaven.)
- Bob Downe
- Alex Dyson
- Randy Feltface
- Chris Franklin
- Hamish & Andy
- Rolf Harris
- Guido Hatzis
- Luke Heggie
- Lano and Woodley
- Chris Lilley
- Elle McFeast (Note: Including one for the cast of Live and Sweaty.)
- Matt Okine
- Roy and HG
- Akmal Saleh
- Scared Weird Little Guys
- Matt Tilley
