= Rodney Rude =

Australian 'blue' stand-up comedian, poet and writer

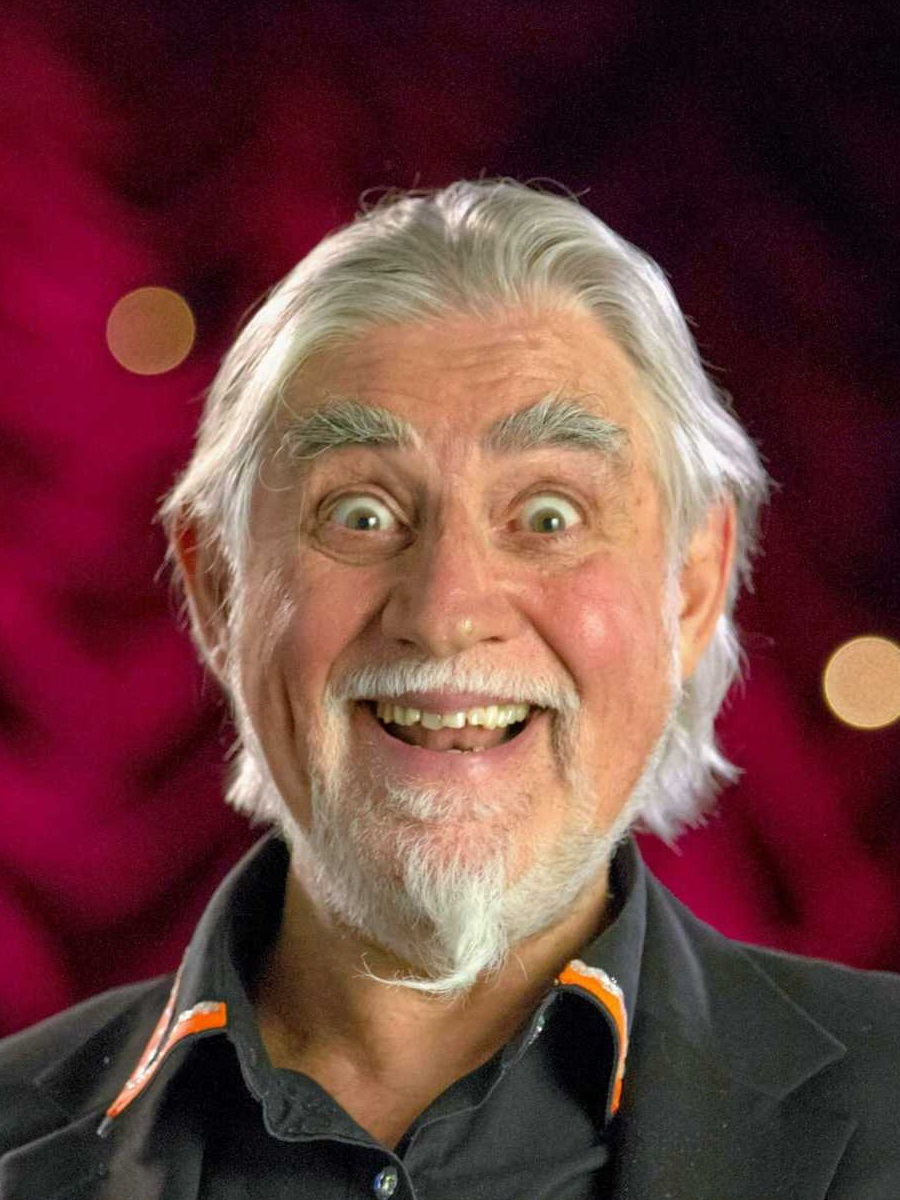
- Rude in 2020
- Born: Rodney Malcolm Keft; Australia

Comedy career
- Years active: 1964–2006, 2011–2016, 2022–2025
- Medium: Stand-up, music
- Genres: Observational comedy, blue comedy, insult comedy
- Subjects: Australian culture, current events, pop culture
- Website: www.rude.com.au

Rodney Rude (born Rodney Malcolm Keft) is an Australian-born blue stand-up comedian, poet, writer, and musician.

Rude is best known for his bawdy humour and has released 12 albums and five videos all distributed locally by EMI Records. Rude has been nominated for the ARIA Award for Best Comedy Release nine times between 1987 and 2009, and has won two Mo Awards. He officially retired from performing live shows on 9 December 2016.

== Career ==
Rude began his career performing with travelling tent shows on the showground circuit in the early 1960s, singing and playing guitar. His habit of altering the lyrics of songs to amuse himself and his audience prompted him to become a comedian. He left Australia in the mid-1960s to tour the world, and to live and work in the United States, Canada, and Europe under various stage names.

Rude faced legal challenges in Australia due to the nature of his material. He was arrested in Queensland and Western Australia on obscenity charges. He was eventually exonerated by the Supreme Court of Western Australia.

He officially retired from performing live shows on 9 December 2016.

=== The Comedy Store, Sydney ===
In 1981, he was asked by Barry Wain to return to Australia to set up The Comedy Store in Sydney, and started working as the club's compere.

== Style ==
Rude's comedy was energetic and aggressive, peppered with expletives and his trademark rat-tat-tat laugh, and typically suitable for adult audiences only. He faced criticism for using material which was often homophobic and sometimes racist.

Recurring stage props often included a small ukulele for short musical pieces, hats too small for his head, oversized clown shoes, metal tea strainers used to imitate a fly (insect) and material from his grandfather's joke book. There were several regular characters that appeared in his act; most notably 'Bishop Rude' while wielding a toilet plunger, 'Harry Muff (The Diver)'—where Rodney would dress in a shirt to below his waist and short pants with belt around his knees—and 'Half Rude', where Rodney would bend himself at the knees into a fabricated set of prosthetic legs with foam around his backside to create a false pair of buttocks.

Rude's interaction with his audiences ("trendsetters") is a key part of his act, including the famous 'limericks' toward the end of each show. Positive hecklers were frequent at any Rude concert because his quick-fire responses were an integral part of his act, making it something of a badge of honour for an audience member to be put down by a Rude comeback. His catchphrase "You know what I hate?", which preceded several of his jokes, was always responded to by the audience calling out in unison,"What do you hate, Rodney!?"

== Discography ==
=== Live and compilation albums ===
List of albums, with selected details and chart positions
Title	Album details	Peak chart positions	Certifications
Title	Album details	AUS	Certifications
Rodney Rude Live	Released: July 1984; Format: LP, Cassette; Label: EMI Music (EMX 430018); Recorded at Di Di's, Sydney	1	
I Got More	Released: August 1985; Format: LP, Cassette; Label: EMI Music (EMC 271); Recorded at Middleback Theatre	7	
Rude Rides Again	Released: November 1986; Format: LP, Cassette; Label: EMI Music (EMC 297); Recorded on the Gold Coast, Queensland	24	
Not Guilty	Released: December 1988; Format: LP, Cassette, CD; Label: EMI Music (GET 791446)	30	
A Legend	Released: October 1991; Format: Cassette, CD; Label: EMI Music (GET 797987); Recorded in Perth, Australia	36	
Classic Rude: The Best of Rodney Rude	Released: 1992; Format: CD; Label: EMI Music (7809874); Compilation album	—	
Live – Rats Arse Tour I Don't Give a Rats Arse	Released: 1996; Format: CD; Label: Kemalda (CAT#011); Recorded during the 1995 Rats Arse Tour	64	
More Grunt	Released: November 1998; Format: CD; Label: EMI (4982752); Recorded live on stage	23	ARIA: Gold
Ya' Mum's Bum	Released: October 2000; Format: CD; Label: EMI (5296642); Recorded live on stage	22	ARIA: Gold
Rude Bastard	Released: October 2002; Format: CD; Label: EMI (5435452); Recorded live on stage	17	ARIA: Platinum
Twice as Rude	Released: October 2004; Format: CD; Label: EMI (8754772); Recorded live on stage	35	
Frog Sack	Released: November 2006; Format: CD; Label: EMI (09463819382 1); Recorded live on stage	30	

=== Video releases ===
Title	Details	Certification
Rude Rude Rodney Rude on Video	Released: 1984; Label: Format: VHS	
Rude Rides Again	Released: 1987 out; Label: Format: VHS	
I Don't Give a Rats Arse	Released: 1996; Label: Kemalda; Format: VHS	
Get Rude On – Live on Stage Vol. 4	Released: 2002; Label: Kemalda; Format: VHS	ARIA: Platinum
Rodney Rude Goes the Growl	Released: 2008; Label:	

== Awards ==
Rude has been nominated for the ARIA Award for Best Comedy Release nine times between 1987 and 2009, and has won two Mo Awards. He officially retired from performing live shows on 9 December 2016.

=== ARIA Music Awards ===
The ARIA Music Awards is an annual awards ceremony that recognises excellence, innovation, and achievement across all genres of Australian music. Rude has been nominated for ten awards.

Year	Nominee / work	Award	Result
1987	Rude Rides Again	Best Comedy Release	Nominated
1987	Rude Rides Again	Highest Selling Album	Nominated
1989	Not Guilty	Best Comedy Release	Nominated
1992	A Legend	Best Comedy Release	Nominated
1999	More Grunt	Best Comedy Release	Nominated
2001	Ya Mum's Bum	Best Comedy Release	Nominated
2003	Rude Bastard	Best Comedy Release	Nominated
2005	Twice As Rude	Best Comedy Release	Nominated
2007	Frog Sack	Best Comedy Release	Nominated
2009	Rodney Rude Goes the Growl	Best Comedy Release	Nominated

=== Mo Awards ===
The Australian Entertainment Mo Awards (commonly known informally as the Mo Awards), were annual Australian entertainment industry awards. They recognise achievements in live entertainment in Australia from 1975 to 2016. Rodney Rude won two awards in that time.

Year	Nominee / work	Award	Result (wins only)
1985	Rodney Rude	Best Comedy Act of the Year	Won
2006	Rodney Rude	Outstanding Contribution to Australian Comedy	Won

Preceded by Purple Rain by Prince and The Revolution	Australian Kent Music Report number-one album 20 August – 2 September 1984	Succeeded by H'its Huge '84 by Various artists
