= Do Not Talk Over Me =

Compilation album by Guido Hatzis
- Released: November 1999
- Genre: Comedy
- Label: Grudge
- Producer: Bradley Hulme

Guido Hatzis chronology
Do Not Talk Over Me (1999)	Whatever... (2000)

Do Not Talk Over Me is the debut album of material from Greek-Australian comic character, Guido Hatzis. The album is a compilation of prank call segments from the Triple M radio show, CRUD. The album was released in November 1999 and peaked at number 11 on the ARIA Charts and was certified platinum.

At the ARIA Music Awards of 2000 the album won the ARIA Award for Best Comedy Release.

== Track listing ==
1. "Masseuse" - 3:22
2. "Queen" - 2:04
3. "Waxing 1" - 1:40
4. "Waxing 2" - 1:31
5. "Tow Truck Driver 1" - 0:48
6. "Tow Truck Driver 2" - 0:33
7. "Tow Truck Driver 3" - 0:41
8. "Tow Truck Driver 4" - 1:14
9. "Restaurant (Centrepoint)" - 2:27
10. "Tow Bar Fitter 1" - 0:50
11. "Tow Bar Fitter 2" - 0:31
12. "Tow Bar Fitter 3" - 0:48
13. "House Call (Butler)" - 2:22
14. "House Call (Suck My C**k)" - 1:04
15. "Swimming Pool" - 2:01
16. "Pope 1" - 1:32
17. "Pope 2" - 1:05
18. "English Hotel 1" - 0:51
19. "English Hotel 2" - 2:12
20. "National Park" - 2:47
21. "Pharmacy 1" - 1:42
22. "Pharmacy 2" - 1:46
23. "Sainthood" - 2:05
24. "Florist" - 0:55
25. "Plumber" - 3:09
26. "Vince 1" - 1:09
27. "Vince 2" - 0:57
28. "Vince 3" - 1:01
29. "Vince 4" - 0:33
30. "Vince 5" - 0:36

== Charts ==
=== Weekly charts ===
Chart (1999–2000)	Peak position
Australian Albums (ARIA)	11

=== Year-end charts ===
Chart (1999)	Position
Australian Albums (ARIA)	93
Chart (2000)	Position
Australian Albums (ARIA)	60

== Certifications ==
Region	Certification	Certified units/sales
Australia (ARIA)	Platinum	70,000^{^}
^{^} Shipments figures based on certification alone.
