= Ken Sutcliffe =

Australian sporting journalist and radio and television personality

Ken Sutcliffe OAM
- Born: 15 November 1947 (age 79); Oberon, New South Wales, Australia
- Other name: The Male Model from Mudgee
- Occupation: Retired sports broadcaster
- Years active: 1966–2016
- Employer(s): Retired (formerly Nine Network)
- Known for: Wide World of Sports; Nine News
- Spouse: Anne Sutcliffe
- Children: Rachael, Simone, Scott

Ken Sutcliffe (born 15 November 1947) is an Australian retired sporting journalist and radio and television personality, known for his association with the Nine Network.

== Early life and career ==
Sutcliffe was born in Oberon, New South Wales and grew up in Mudgee where he started his radio career in 1966, followed by a stint as a general announcer at 2LF Young, and began work on television as a newsreader on local station CBN-8 Orange. He joined TNQ-7 in Townsville during the mid-1970s

He made his television debut in 1982, hosting Bedtime stories with Ken and Daz alongside cohost Darrell Eastlake. The show only lasted 8 episodes.

== Career ==
Sutcliffe first joined the Nine Network in 1979 at station TCN9-Sydney, appearing in World of Sport with Ron Casey and became the main sports presenter on the Nine Network TCN-9 Sydney's evening news in 1988 following the departure of Mike Gibson to Network Ten. and remained in that role until his retirement and final Nine News sports report on 8 December 2016.

Sutcliffe was a long-time host of the Nine Network's Wide World of Sports productions, initially joining the programme in 1982. After a year as a co-host on Graham Kennedy's late night news programme in 1988, he rejoined WWOS as host in 1989.

During his time with Wide World of Sports and Nine News, Sutcliffe hosted coverage of and reported on the Summer Olympics in Los Angeles (1984) and London (2012), the America's Cup defence in Fremantle (1987), and the Winter Olympics in Calgary (1988), Albertville (1992), Lillehammer (1994) and Vancouver (2010).

He hosted four Commonwealth Games for the network: Brisbane in 1982, Auckland in 1990, Kuala Lumpur in 1998, and Melbourne in 2006.

In addition he presented Wimbledon for 20 years, the US Open Tennis Championships for more than a decade, and was in Augusta, Georgia in 1997 hosting the Masters telecast when Tiger Woods broke through for his historic victory (he also hosted eight other Masters telecasts).

Sutcliffe hosted Rugby League Grand Finals and the State of Origin series, as well as the US Open Golf, the Pan Pacific and Olympic swimming trials plus the World Swimming Championships in Japan and the Brisbane Goodwill Games.

On 2 November 2016, Sutcliffe announced he would retire from his role as Nine News sports editor and Nine News Sydney sport presenter at the end of the year. He was replaced by Cameron Williams.

== Awards and honours ==
In 2014, he was awarded Australian Sports Commission Media Award for Lifetime Achievement

Sutcliffe was awarded the Medal of the Order of Australia (OAM) in the 2019 Queen's Birthday Honours for "service to the broadcast media, particularly to television".

== Other media ==
Sutcliffe published a book of memoirs in 2009, The Wide World of Ken Sutcliffe.

He was a featured character in The Twelfth Man's comedy productions, with the story-line being that he was the most handsome of the WWOS and Commentary Team presenters — the "male model from Mudgee", sighed over by the wives of Richie Benaud and Max Walker. Sutcliffe (his main rival) is kidnapped by Walker as the latter tries to rejoin the Commentary Team. The only voice Billy Birmingham did not do himself was that of Sutcliffe — it was Sutcliffe himself who voiced his character.

Media offices
Preceded by Mike Gibson	Nine News Sydney; Sport presenter (Monday to Friday) (Sunday to Thursday); 1988–2016	Succeeded by Cameron Williams
