= Whatever... =

Compilation album by Guido Hatzis
- Released: November 2000
- Genre: Comedy
- Label: Universal
- Producer: Julian Schiller, Tony Moclair

Guido Hatzis chronology
Do Not Talk Over Me (1999)	Whatever... (2000)	Deported (2002)

Whatever... is the second album of material from Greek-Australian comic character, Guido Hatzis. The album is a compilation of prank call segments from the Triple M radio show, CRUD. The album was released in November 2000 and peaked at number 8 on the ARIA Charts and was certified platinum.

At the ARIA Music Awards of 2001 the album won the ARIA Award for Best Comedy Release.

== Track listing ==
Disc 1 - Guido v Skippy Land

1. "Rent... Geoff Speaking" - 2:16
2. "Clothes Shop" - 2:42
3. "Mobile Phones" - 1:00
4. "Guido Class" - 2:27
5. "Restaurant Review" - 0:25
6. "Full Body Wax" - 1:42
7. "Mechanic" - 1:05
8. "Florist" - 0:44
9. "Florist 2" - 0:10
10. "Mayor Guido" - 2:03
11. "Shared House" - 1:31
12. "Shared House 2" - 0:15
13. "Telemarketing" - 2:16
14. "Owner / Driver" - 0:52
15. "Owner / Driver 2" - 0:27
16. "Name Change" - 2:09
17. "University Degree" - 1:08
18. "Baker" - 0:17
19. "Baker 2" - 0:44
20. "Supermarket" - 1:28
21. "Clown" - 2:08
22. "Paperboy" - 1:29
23. "Number Plate" - 1:21
24. "Refuge" - 1:19
25. "Telemarketing 2" - 2:13
26. "Hotel Reservations" - 1:09
27. "Flowers" - 1:08
28. "Helicopter" - 1:30
29. "The Pretender" - 4:33

Disc 2 - Guido v The World

1. "Danny Boy" (Ireland) - 0:32
2. "Danny Boy 2" (Ireland) - 0:47
3. "Irish Eyes Are Drooling" (Ireland) - 1:59
4. "Tokyo Shock Boys" (Japan) - 2:06
5. "Moccassins" (Japan) - 1:28
6. "Pink Ponchos" (Mexico) - 0:27
7. "Pink Ponchos 2" (Mexico) - 1:10
8. "Coin of the Realm" (Canada) - 0:30
9. "Green Berets" (USA) - 1:32
10. "Clan Reunion 1" (Scotland) - 0:36
11. "Clan Reunion 2" (Scotland) - 0:56
12. "Echo" (Korea) - 0:50
13. "2 Litres" (Korea) - 2:03
14. "Dogs Playing Poker" (France) - 1:30
15. "Arabian Nights" (Egypt) - 1:08

== Charts ==
=== Weekly charts ===
Chart (2000–01)	Peak position
Australian Albums (ARIA)	8

=== Year-end charts ===
Chart (2000)	Position
Australian Albums (ARIA)	73

== Certifications ==
Region	Certification	Certified units/sales
Australia (ARIA)	Platinum	70,000^{^}
^{^} Shipments figures based on certification alone.
