= The Vaughans =

The Vaughans were an Australian musical group. They released one studio album, and their single, "Who Farted?", reached number 43 in Australia in 1995.

== Discography ==
=== Albums ===
Studio album, with selected details
Title	Details
Krap Rap	Released: 1995; Label: Roadshow Music (17185-2); Format: CD

=== Singles ===
List of singles, with selected chart positions
Title	Year	Peak chart positions	Album
Title	Year	AUS	Album
"Curry in a Hurry (Poppadum)"	1995	—	Krap Rap
"Who Farted?"	1995	43	Krap Rap

== Awards and nominations ==
=== ARIA Music Awards ===
The ARIA Music Awards are a set of annual ceremonies presented by Australian Recording Industry Association (ARIA), which recognise excellence, innovation, and achievement across all genres of the music of Australia. They commenced in 1987.

Year	Nominee / work	Award	Result	Ref.
1996	"Who Farted?"	Best Comedy Release	Nominated	
