= Darrell Eastlake =

Australian television presenter

- Born: 11 July 1942
- Died: 19 April 2018 (aged 75); Central Coast, New South Wales, Australia
- Years active: 1965 – 2005 (retirement)
- Known for: Sports broadcasting (radio and television), Journalist
- Notable work: Grand Prix Motorcycle Racing; State of Origin

Darrell Eastlake (11 July 1942 – 19 April 2018) was an Australian radio and television presenter, commentator and sports journalist, best known for his long association with the Nine Network. Prior to his media career, Eastlake worked as a Qantas baggage handler, before making surfboards and running a surf shop. His career in broadcasting began in the 1960s when he gave surf reports on Sydney radio station 2UW (now known as KIIS 106.5).

== Motor racing ==
During the mid-1970s, Eastlake dabbled in motor racing when he drove a Leyland P76, infrequently, in the Touring Car category .

== Broadcasting ==
Eastlake had been calling rugby league for NBN-3 in Newcastle before he began working for the Nine Network in 1982, commentating on the weightlifting at the 1982 Commonwealth Games. Eastlake also provided colourful commentary for Nine's Wide World of Sports and its coverage of events including State of Origin telecasts for a decade from the mid-1980s working with others such as Ken Sutcliffe, Ray Warren, Mike Gibson, Ian Maurice, and 'Supercoach' Jack Gibson as well as former players Mick Cronin, Peter Sterling and Paul Vautin.

During his media career, Eastlake was noted for his over-the-top voice and loud antics aimed at raising the excitement of listeners or viewers, providing commentary for weightlifting and motorsport. This trait was parodied by Billy Birmingham in his The Twelfth Man sporting commentary impersonations, including his Eastlake signature of (with a rising voice) "taking the voice back up to the threshold of pain". He is best remembered for presenting broadcasts of the 500cc Motorcycle World Championship alongside former Grand Prix motorcycle racing World Champion Barry Sheene, and for presenting Formula One races with former Formula One World Champion Alan Jones. He also presented the British Open Golf championships.

== Personal life ==
In 1993 (aged 50) Eastlake suffered a heart attack while commentating at Kurrawa on the Gold Coast for the Australian Surf Life Saving Championships. He was revived at the scene by Surf Life Savers and transported to hospital, where he suffered a second attack.

Eastlake retired from the media in 2006 and fell ill in 2010 with Alzheimer's disease, dementia and emphysema brought on by years of being a heavy cigarette smoker.

On 19 April 2018, Eastlake died in a nursing home where he lived on the New South Wales Central Coast.
