= Guido Hatzis =

Greek-Australian comic character

Guido Hatzis is a Greek-Australian comic character created by Australian comedians Tony Moclair and Julian Schiller and voiced by Moclair. Guido appeared originally on Schiller and Moclair's radio program "Crud" on the Australian Radio Network Triple M. Most of Guido's comedy involves making prank calls that are usually centred on outrageous claims about his looks and abilities, Greek stereotypes, and extreme bluntness.

== History ==
Moclair appropriated the last name "Hatzis" from friend and sometime producer of the "Crud" program, fellow broadcaster and actor Chris Hatzis; Chris Hatzis, Julian Schiller and Tony Moclair are alumni of the Breakfasters on Melbourne's 3RRR. Chris Hatzis based the character on fellow school friend Paul Catelaris a.k.a. "Pauly", a Greek man who migrated to Melbourne from Athens in the late 1980s.

In 2000, Guido also appeared in the music video "Always Be with You" by Australian band Human Nature as a guest in a nightclub with Human Nature performing, later in the video, during the performance he calls band member Phil (Burton), on his mobile phone, interrupting the performance, to tell them their dancing is terrible, and proceeds to show them humorous dance moves.

Guido Hatzis currently has a YouTube channel with more recent prank calls, an Instagram account, a Twitter account and a Facebook account.

== Discography ==
=== Studio albums ===
List of studio albums with Australian chart positions
| Title | Album details | Peak chart positions | Certification |
| Title | Album details | AUS | Certification |
|---|---|---|---|
| Do Not Talk Over Me | Released: November 1999; Label: Grudge Records (157145-2); Format: CD | 11 | ARIA: Platinum |
| Whatever... | Released: November 2000; Label: Universal Music Australia (013067-2); Format: 2xCD + CD_Rom | 8 | ARIA: Platinum |
| Deported | Released: October 2002; Label: Universal Music Australia (0666192); Format: 2xCD | 39 | |

== Awards ==
=== ARIA Music Awards ===
The ARIA Music Awards is an annual awards ceremony that recognises excellence, innovation, and achievement across all genres of Australian music. Guido Hatiz has won two awards from two nominations.

| Year | Nominee / work | Award | Result | Ref. |
|---|---|---|---|---|
| 2000 | Do Not Talk Over Me | Best Comedy Release | Won | |
| 2001 | Whatever... | Best Comedy Release | Won | |
