= Scared Weird Little Guys =

Australian comedy music duo

- Origin: Melbourne, Victoria, Australia
- Genres: Comedy, parody
- Years active: 1990–2011
- Members: John Chaplin-Fleming; Rusty Berther
- Website: Official site

Scared Weird Little Guys (also referred to as SWLG or The Scaredies) are an Australian comedy music duo formed in July 1990, comprising John Fleming (vocals, guitar, mandolin) and Rusty Berther (vocals, guitar, banjo). The Scaredies performed their last live show in Brisbane in May 2011, until a one-off benefit gig in Melbourne in October 2016. They reunited for a three-day stint at the Brisbane Powerhouse on 8 to 10 March 2019.

== History ==
In 1987, Fleming joined "Four Chairs No Waiting", an a cappella group comprising David Holmes, Ramsey Collins and Rusty Berther. The group performed aboard a Fairstar cruise, as well as touring RSL clubs around Sydney. They performed during most of Expo 88 in Brisbane. In 1989 Berther and Fleming joined "The Phones", one of Australia's top a cappella groups, which boasted members such as Paul Keelan, Michael Dalton and Reg Ellery. Performing at comedy and cabaret venues around Australia, the group also held a regular TV spot on Channel 7's Bert Newton Show. Following the group's break-up in 1990, Fleming and Berther teamed up and moved away from a cappella to concentrate on musical comedy routines.

The duo had much success touring Australia, as well as more than 20 tours of festivals and college campuses in North America, and three tours of the UK in 1997, 1998 and 2001.

The name "Scared Weird Little Guys" comes from a line in the Al Pacino movie Cruising.

The Scaredies announced on 1 August 2010 that the act would be coming to an end after 21 years. They embarked on a national farewell tour named 'Enough Already', which ran until mid-2011. The duo released a final CD entitled Enough Already which included recordings from their Mount Gambier, Horsham and Warrnambool shows.

The Scaredies did in excess of 4,600 live gigs, performing their final public show in Brisbane on 22 May 2011.

The Scared Weird Little Guys continue to perform together for corporate events and private functions and the occasional benefit gig.

And at the 2016 Melbourne International Comedy Festival Rusty made a rare public appearance as the headline act for the show, 1 Night Stand: A Musical Comedy Showcase.

== Media appearances ==
The duo have performed regular spots in both television and radio since 1990.

=== Television appearances ===
The duo performed on almost every live Australian television show. Some notable examples include:

- Hey Hey It's Saturday
- Good Morning Australia
- The NRL Footy Show
- Sale of the Century A personal favourite of the group, who appeared in the giftshop.
- The Micallef Programme Appeared as the mystery guests of the week. When Shaun opened the door to them, they appeared to be ready to perform a song, except Shaun shut the door in their faces.
- You May Be Right The show's houseband.
- Rove Live
- Just For Laughs

=== Notable performances ===
The Scared Weird Little Guys performed regularly at the Melbourne International Comedy Festival, the Adelaide Fringe Festival as well as the Edinburgh Festival Fringe and the Spiegeltent. They featured at the closing ceremony of the 2006 Melbourne Commonwealth Games, warming up the 90,000 strong crowd for 45 minutes.

In the late 90s the Scared Weird Little Guys performed a show called 'Score', incorporating music, comedy and symphony orchestras.

They also made noteworthy appearances as The Scared Weird Little Guys Superband. This usually consisted of John and Rusty with the addition of a full rock band including horn section. The Superband was a fixture at the Melbourne Comedy Festival for many years and featured guest appearances from international and local comedians singing cover songs. Guest singers have included Ross Noble, Rich Hall, Maria Bamford, Rove McManus, Jo Stanley, Jimeoin, Lano and Woodley, Bob Downe, Alan Brough and Adam Hills.

== Discography ==
=== Albums and EPs ===
Title	Details
Bloody Jeff	Released: 1993; Label: Scared Weird Little Guys (SWLG0001)
Scared	Released: 1994; Label: Scared Weird Little Guys (SWLG0002)
Macadamia	Released: 1997; Label: Scared Weird Little Guys (SWLG0002)
Live at 42 Walnut Crescent	Released: 2000; Label: Belly Laugh Records (SW20005)
Bits and Pieces	Released: May 2004; Label: Shock (SWL001)
Scared Weird Little Songs	Released: 2009; Label: Scared Weird Little Guys
Enough Already	Released: 2011; Label: Scared Weird Little Guys (SWL001); Note: Live in October 2010

== Awards and nominations ==
The duo won several awards throughout their career, as well as being nominated for various high-profile awards.

=== ARIA Music Awards ===
The ARIA Music Awards are a set of annual ceremonies presented by Australian Recording Industry Association (ARIA), which recognise excellence, innovation, and achievement across all genres of the music of Australia. They commenced in 1987.

Year	Nominee / work	Award	Result	Ref.
1995	Scared	Best Comedy Release	Nominated	
2004	Bits and Pieces	Best Comedy Release	Won	

=== Mo Awards ===
The Australian Entertainment Mo Awards (commonly known informally as the Mo Awards), were annual Australian entertainment industry awards. They recognise achievements in live entertainment in Australia from 1975 to 2016. Scared Weird Little Guys won one award in that time.

Year	Nominee / work	Award	Result (wins only)
1999	Scared Weird Little Guys	Comedy Group of the Year	Won
