= Bill Lawry... This Is Your Life =

Bill Lawry... This is Your Life

Studio album by The Twelfth Man
- Released: 7 December 1997
- Recorded: The Loft, Mittagong, November 1997
- Genre: Spoken word, comedy
- Length: 49:43
- Label: EMI Music
- Producer: Billy Birmingham, David Froggatt

The Twelfth Man chronology
Wired World of Sports II (1994)	Bill Lawry... This is Your Life (1997)	The Final Dig? (2001)

Bill Lawry... This is Your Life is the fifth album released by The Twelfth Man. Released on 7 December 1997, it reached number one on the ARIA Album Charts for two weeks. The album contains special guest vocals from Jimmy Barnes, John Farnham, and Merv Hughes.

At the ARIA Music Awards of 1998, the album was nominated for Best Comedy Release losing to Paul McDermott's Unplugged Good News Week Tapes: Volume 1.

== Plot ==
An episode of This Is Your Life is aired about Bill Lawry, with many of Bill's friends and rivals making appearances. There is a running gag throughout that Richie is none too impressed by Bill receiving an episode of This Is Your Life before him and not inviting him to a party in the city. Another running gag is Bill Lawry repeatedly calling host Mike Munro, Matt Munro.

== Track listing ==
CD (4934352)

1. "What's on the Box" – 1:11
2. "Bill's Surprise" – 3:32
3. ""..You Were Born..." / The Doctor / The School Master" – 8:29
4. "Blind Love / The Wife / The Pigeons / The School Chum / Ratings-winning Guest #1" – 7:59
5. "Bill's Early Careers / Richie / 'The Don' / Ratings-winning Guest #2" – 8:25
6. "Peter Pollock / The Nawab / Geoff Boycott / The Fan Club" – 7:40
7. "Bill Hangs Up His Boots / Chappelli And Maxy / Tony / The Hero" – 12:27

== Charts ==
=== Weekly charts ===
Chart (1997/98)	Peak position
Australian Albums (ARIA)	1
New Zealand Albums (RMNZ)	27

=== Year-end charts ===
Chart (1997)	Position
Australian (ARIA Charts)	17
Australian artist (ARIA Charts)	7

== Certifications ==
Region	Certification	Certified units/sales
Australia (ARIA)	3× Platinum	210,000^{^}
^{^} Shipments figures based on certification alone.

== See also ==
- List of number-one albums of 1997 (Australia)
- List of number-one albums of 1998 (Australia)
- List of Top 25 albums for 1997 in Australia
