= Wired World of Sports II =

Studio album by The Twelfth Man
- Released: December 1994
- Recorded: Duke Street Recordings, November 1994
- Genre: Spoken word, comedy
- Length: 117:58
- Label: EMI Music
- Producer: Billy Birmingham, David Froggatt

The Twelfth Man chronology
| Still the 12th Man (1992) | Wired World of Sports II (1994) | Bill Lawry... This is Your Life (1997) |

Wired World of Sports II is the fourth album released by Australian comedy ensemble, the Twelfth Man. Released in December 1994, it peaked at number one on the ARIA Charts for three weeks.

At the ARIA Music Awards of 1995, the album won Best Comedy Release and Highest Selling Album.

== Plot ==
A day in the life of Max Walker, who has to prove during the broadcast of Wired World of Sports that he is fit to rejoin the Channel 9 cricket commentary team. This results in the abduction of Ken Sutcliffe, his rival for the position on the commentary team, and something known as the "Maxophone" (Max blowing his nose to the tune of the Wide World of Sports theme).

== Track listing ==
CD (8320992)

=== Disc one ===
1. "The Wake-Up Call?" - 1:56
2. "The Good News" - 6:49
3. "Brekky" - 4:01
4. "The Cab Ride" - 2:34
5. "The Bad News" - 7:37
6. "Has Anyone Seen Ken?" - 4:09
7. "The Show (Part one)" - 27:09

=== Disc two ===
1. "The Show (Part two)" - 17:50
2. "The Show (Part three)" - 14:09
3. "The Show (Part four)" - 14:31
4. "The Triumph" - 2:14
5. "The Tragedy" - 1:39

== Charts ==
=== Weekly charts ===
| Chart (1994/95) | Peak position |
|---|---|
| Australian Albums (ARIA) | 1 |
| New Zealand Albums (RMNZ) | 6 |

=== Year-end charts ===
| Chart (1994) | Position |
|---|---|
| Australian (ARIA Charts) | 8 |
| Australian artist (ARIA Charts) | 1 |

== Certifications ==
| Region | Certification | Certified units/sales |
|---|---|---|
| Australia (ARIA) | 3× Platinum | 210,000^{^} |
^{^} Shipments figures based on certification alone.

== See also ==
- List of number-one albums of 1994 (Australia)
- List of number-one albums of 1995 (Australia)
- List of Top 25 albums for 1994 in Australia
