= Boned! =

Studio album studio by The Twelfth Man
- Released: 2 December 2006
- Recorded: Carradon, November 2006
- Genres: Spoken word, comedy music
- Length: 2:36:00
- Label: EMI Music
- Producers: Billy Birmingham, David Frogatt

The Twelfth Man chronology
The Final Dig? (2001)	Boned! (2006)	The Box Set (2009)

Boned! is the seventh and final album released by The Twelfth Man. Boned! was released on 2 December 2006 it reached number one on the ARIA Album Charts for one week in December 2006.

The album's title Boned! comes from the press reaction to the Mark Llewellyn affidavit that revealed that the then Channel 9 Television CEO Eddie McGuire wanted to sack, or "bone" then-Today presenter Jessica Rowe.

At the ARIA Music Awards of 2007, the album was nominated for Best Comedy Release losing to Live by Dave Hughes. The album was nominated for Highest Selling Album losing to The Winner's Journey by Damien Leith.

== Plot ==
Due to the recent spree of cost-cutting at the Nine Network, new CEO Eddie McGuire has "boned" the entire cricket commentary team, and replaced them with one person; The Twelfth Man himself, Billy Birmingham. Naturally, this gets the team's captain Richie Benaud incredibly mad ("you've what!"), as Birmingham has made a living from impersonating them for over 20 years, with no compensation whatsoever. This marks the debut of Nine's English commentator Mark Nicholas as a character not dissimilar-sounding to Austin Powers, as does Alan Jones and Eddie McGuire.

This has led to Richie attempting to get himself and the team their jobs back by running "Operation Kill Billy". This includes appearing on Alan Jones's breakfast program and starting a petition, all to no avail. Also he seeks the assistance of the Prime Minister John Howard to get their jobs back.

Their plans are interrupted briefly by an injury crisis for the touring English cricket side (described as a "complete spare parts side") which sees Tony Greig and Mark Nicholas, as well as Graham Gooch being recruited into the team for a test being held at the WACA Ground, without much success. Mark and Tony get badly beaten up by the 'conquering' Australia.

Richie engages the help of Australian music legend Michael Gudinski, and then Australian Idol host Andrew G (according to Benaud "Andrew V from channel G") who attempts to teach the commentary team how to speak like rappers. The team does a cover version of Birmingham's hit "Marvellous," with a modern rap rock edge, which fails badly. The song features backing vocals from Jimmy Barnes (and his children), and Johnny Diesel.

In the end, Billy tenders his resignation to McGuire, stating that it is the most he has ever worked, and that the job affects his love for the game of golf. Richie and the team, unaware that Birmingham has resigned, offer to pay him out to the tune of $1.6 million, which Birmingham sneakily accepts anyway, resulting in a furious reaction from Benaud upon learning he need not have given him the money.

== Track listing ==
CD (3840192)

=== Disc 1 ===
1. "Scene 1: The Boning!" - 6:12
2. "Scene 2: The Golf Course" - 1:46
3. "Scene 3: The Dream" - 6:09
4. "Scene 4: Team Meeting #1" - 9:53
5. "Scene 5: The Shithole #1" - 4:05
6. "Scene 6: Alan Jones Radio Show" - 9:38
7. "Scene 7: The Shithole #2" - 8:53
8. "Scene 8: The Gabba" - 30:54

=== Disc 2 ===
1. "Scene 9: The Gudinski Meeting" - 5:21
2. "Scene 10: Martin Place" - 7:15
3. "Scene 11: Team Meeting #2" - 9:28
4. "Scene 12: Team Meeting #3" - 6:23
5. "Scene 13: The WACA" - 25:50
6. "Scene 14: Marvellous" - 5:58
7. "Scene 15: Sorry Eddie" - 1:59
8. "Scene 16: The Shithole #3" - 5:34
9. "Scene 17: The Lunch" - 6:25
10. "Scene 18: Sucked In" - 3:20

== Charts ==
=== Weekly charts ===
Chart (2006/07)	Peak position
Australian Albums (ARIA)	1
New Zealand Albums (RMNZ)	5

=== Year-end charts ===
Chart (2006)	Position
Australian Albums (ARIA)	9
Chart (2007)	Position
Australian Artist Albums (ARIA)	43

== Certifications ==
Region	Certification	Certified units/sales
Australia (ARIA)	4× Platinum	280,000^{^}
^{^} Shipments figures based on certification alone.

== See also ==
- List of number-one albums of 2006 (Australia)
- List of top 25 albums for 2006 in Australia
