= Ray Warren =

Australian sports commentator (born 1943)

Ray Warren OAM
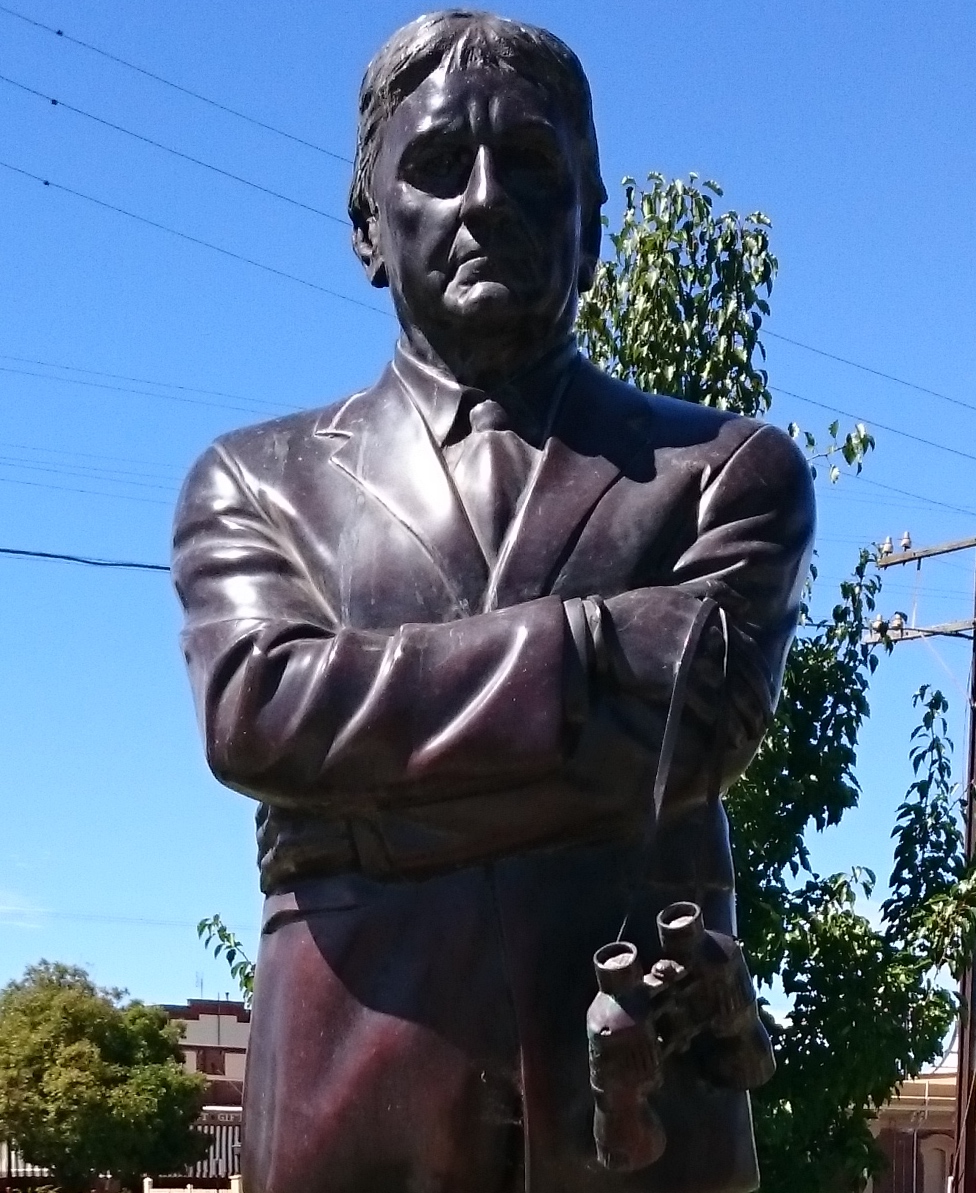
- Statue of Warren in Junee NSW
- Born: 11 June 1943 (age 83); Junee, New South Wales, Australia
- Other names: Rabbits, Rabs, The Voice of Rugby League
- Citizenship: Australian
- Occupation: Sports commentator
- Years active: 1967–2022
- Spouse: Cher Warren
- Children: Chris Warren (son); Holly Warren (daughter); Mark Warren (son)

Raymond Warren OAM (born 11 June 1943) is an Australian retired sports commentator, known for his coverage of televised professional rugby league matches on the Nine Network. He is known as the "Voice of Rugby League", and called 99 State of Origin games as well as 45 NRL Grand Finals. Warren also used to call Australian swimming team events and the FINA World Championships until Nine lost the rights to these events in 2008 and in 2012 participated in Nine's coverage of the London Olympics.

== Career ==
Born in Junee, New South Wales on 11 June 1943 of English descent, Warren initially followed in the footsteps of his brother by joining the police force. He joined the NSW Police Cadets on 5 December 1960 and then transferred to the ACT Police in Canberra in 1964. Warren served a total of three years in the ACT Police. It was during his stint in uniform he got a phone call as a result of all the door-knocking he had done at various radio stations as a teenager. Warren took the job offered to him at 2LF Young, New South Wales as a sales representative, trotting commentator and rugby league commentator, which started his career in broadcasting.

He began commentating on television through the Amco Cup on Channel Ten with Keith Barnes in 1974. In 1980, Ten approached Warren to call the Melbourne Cup, the first of three Cups he called for the network. He also became Network Ten's chief Rugby League caller in 1983. In 1984 he was to head up Ten's commentary for the Los Angeles Olympics but refused to take the mission. As a nervous flyer, Warren had grave reservations about the trans-Pacific haul and suddenly realised he could not get onto the plane. In 1986, Warren was fired by the network, primarily because it wanted to replace him as its chief rugby league commentator with former international player Rex Mossop.

Over the next six years, Warren also called horse races. In 1988 he was recruited by the Nine Network to commentate on the 1988 Rugby League World Cup final and the 1989 state of origin series alongside Darrell Eastlake, Michael Cronin, Jack Gibson and Balmain Tigers coach Warren Ryan, 1989 Trans-Tasman test series alongside Darrell Eastlake again and Jack Gibson and to be part of its team to broadcast swimming at the 1990 Commonwealth Games with Norman May. The television rights for rugby league were bought by Nine for the 1991 State of Origin Series, 1992 season and onwards and he has been calling the game for them ever since. Warren has gradually overcome his fear of flying, though he does still have some fear as evidenced by a well publicised helicopter flight to a game on the Gold Coast in 2012 made necessary due to a delayed flight from Sydney to the Gold Coast. Overcoming his fear has seen him travel to New Zealand, the United Kingdom, Hong Kong, Japan and Canada for the network's swimming or rugby league coverage.

Warren is known for his passionate commentary (often getting into good-natured arguments with fellow commentator Phil Gould about a player or the rules of rugby league during games), and has often been parodied by The Twelfth Man. His voice has become synonymous with important rugby league matches in Australia, and he is renowned for his proficient ability to take over from fellow-commentators when anything interesting happens on the field.

Previously, Warren also worked on Triple M Sydney on the Saturday morning sports show Dead Set Legends with Greg Matthews, Mike Whitney and Russell Barwick. The other members of the Dead Set Legends included Michael Slater, Rebecca Wilson, Richard Freedman and Dan Ginnane, as well being a semi-regular host of 'The Rush Hour' with Dan Ginnane.

Warren was the footy-tip guru with Newcastle's radio station NXFM on the Steve and Kim (& Damo!) Morning Breakfast Talk Show (until the show was cancelled on 26-Oct-2012).

Warren is also a contributor on Melbourne's Sport 927.

On 6 August 2011, a bronze statue of Warren was erected in his hometown of Junee.

In August 2019, Warren was inducted into the National Rugby League Hall of Fame.

The 2021 NRL Grand Final was Warren's final game as commentator after announcing his retirement on 1 June 2022.

In 2022, Warren provided mock commentary for a fictional State of Origin match between Queensland and New South Wales in an episode of children's animated series Bluey.

== Personal life ==
Ray Warren and his wife, Cher, live in the Sydney suburb of Castle Hill with their daughter, Holly. One of their sons, Chris, works for 2GB Sydney on their NRL coverage and Fox Sports News. Ray was once the chief commentator in an early 1990s Western Suburbs Magpies match that Chris played in. The Warrens' other son, Mark, is a broadcaster, actor, voice actor, MC, presenter and auctioneer.

Warren's own personal sporting achievements include playing wing for the Quirindi Grasshoppers, and also playing Tony Roche in a tennis match.
