= Johnny Tapp =

Australian race-caller

- Born: John Frederick Tapp; 20 February 1941 (age 85); Ramsgate, New South Wales, Australia
- Occupations: Race caller and radio presenter
- Years active: 1964−1998
- Honours: Australian Racing Hall of Fame

John Frederick Tapp OAM (born 20 February 1941 in Ramsgate, New South Wales ) is an Australian former racecaller based in Sydney, Australia.

== Career ==
During a career spanning thirty-three years it is estimated that he has called over 50,000 individual races and became the voice of Australian racing to a whole generation.

As a child Tapp developed a fascination with listening to famous racecaller of the day Ken Howard on the Wireless Radio, calling races on a Saturday afternoon.

During the time there was no broadcast of mid-week race meetings, so Tapp began painting Paddle Pop sticks the same colours as the jockeys wore on famous horses of the day and learnt his craft by tossing the sticks into the stormwater drain that ran behind his childhood home and then 'calling' the ensuing races as the sticks floated off.

Tapp recorded a tribute to the 1977 Golden Slipper winner Luskin Star on M7 records. "The Luskin Star Song" was written by Newcastle musicians Phil Mahoney and Princess Chic Murangi. The A side to the record was a song Tapp wrote called "Paleface Adios", a tribute to the famous pacer.

In his memoirs Tapp nominated Kingston Town, Octagonal and Super Impose amongst the best he had seen during his long career. Although retiring from race calling in 1998 John still maintains an involvement through Sky Channel and his program 'John Tapp's Inside Racing'.

== Award ==
He was awarded the Order of Australia Medal in 1996 for service to horse sports as a national and international racecaller, and to charitable organisations as an organiser and compere of fundraising events.

== Discography ==
=== Singles ===
Year	Title	Peak chart positions
Year	Title	AUS
1974	"Little Hondo"	61
1977	"Paleface Adios"	–
