= The Twelfth Man =

Television series

- Born: Billy Birmingham
- Genre: Comedy
- Instrument: Vocals
- Years active: 1984–2015
- Label: EMI Music
- Website: the12thman.com

The Twelfth Man (also known as The 12th Man) is the name for a series of comedy productions by Australian satirist Billy Birmingham. Birmingham, a skilled impersonator, is generally known for parodying Australian sports commentators' voices. As befits the name (a reference to the non-playing reserve in an eleven-player cricket side), Birmingham focused in particular on cricket commentators such as Richie Benaud, Bill Lawry, Ian Chappell and Tony Greig. This is also because many of Australia's cricket commentators have distinctive and easily identifiable voices and accents.

The album parodies are designed as a comical look "behind the scenes" of the Nine Network's cricket commentary. Birmingham traditionally plays all the roles (with the exception of Ken Sutcliffe, who played himself; and some minor female characters, such as Richie Benaud's secretary). Benaud himself sent a critique of each CD to Birmingham and was known to have a mixed opinion of the recordings, due predominantly to Birmingham's use of profanity. All albums were produced and engineered by David Frogatt.

The Twelfth Man is the only Australian recording artist in history to have seven consecutive number one albums. In an article in the Sydney Morning Herald on 22 November 2009, Birmingham announced that Boned! would be his last studio album as The Twelfth Man.

== Personalities parodied ==
In addition to Richie Benaud himself, Bill Lawry, Ian Chappell and Tony Greig, the 12th Man features various other Australian commentators from throughout Channel Nine's line-up. They include Max Walker, Mark "Tubby" Taylor, Ian's brother Greg Chappell, Michael "Slats" Slater, Englishman Mark Nicholas and West Indian Michael Holding.

Several non-cricket commentators are also parodied by Birmingham. They include rugby league commentators Ray "Rabbits" Warren and Paul "Fatty" Vautin, Peter "Sterlo" Sterling, Steve Roach, Darrell Eastlake, Lou Richards, Jack "Supercoach" Gibson, Ian "Bear" Maurice, Mike "Gibbo" Gibson and horse racing commentator Ken Callander.

Other figures from Australian culture are also parodied. They include media magnate and Channel Nine owner Kerry Packer, former prime minister John Howard, journalist Mike Munro, Nine Network continuity announcer Steve Britten, and talkback radio personalities John Laws and Alan Jones.

== Comic themes ==
Productions tend to focus on two themes: the voices and personalities of the commentators themselves, and parodies of athletes' names. This includes both humorous modifications of real-life players, as well as purely fictional names. Virtually all sports and teams are subject to this, except for the Australian cricket team.

Names of Indian cricket team and Pakistani cricket team are the most commonly parodied. For example, Sunil Gavaskar is referred to as Sunil Haveascar, a humorous reference to his fictional teammate "Cuthis Arminhalf" (a reference to Mohinder Amarnath). New Zealand cricket team players' names are sometimes parodied, as are those of the England cricket team. The Australian cricket team receives less parody on the basis of their names, but humorous references still extend to other aspects of the team, in particular Bruce Reid who is called "Breece Rude" by Bill Lawry and who, at one stage, slips over and snaps in half before taping himself back together to resume playing (Reid was known throughout his career for being tall and thin and susceptible to injury).

Humor even extends to the names of umpires and team coaches.

=== Voices and personalities ===
The Twelfth Man is most well known for Birmingham's impression of the main characters voices, as well as their unique personalities and styles on air. These parodies include:

- Richie Benaud is the leader of the Central Commentary Team, and often remarks that "We work as a team, and we do it my way". There is focus on his famous pronunciation of the number two to sound like "chew", with the number two being a very popular term in the series. His fashion sense is also a point of humor, as Benaud's jackets of choice are either cream, white, off-white, ivory, bone or beige. Benaud also has a vineyard in France, "Chateau Verda Flore" managed by a Frenchman named Henri Porte. A very proud man, Benaud is often mistaken for Darrell Eastlake, much to Benaud's chagrin.
- Bill Lawry is another main character, usually presenting with his colleague Tony Greig. Lawry has a relatively high-pitched and nasally voice, with many jokes coming at the expense of his large nose. Lawry is from Victoria and is extremely biased towards Victorian players, venues and crowds. He has a particular affection for fellow Victorians Merv Hughes, Dean Jones and Shane Warne, as well as his collection of racing pigeons. His common expressions include "Got him, yes! Piss off! You're out!" and "The tension, the drama, the buzz, the crowd, the atmosphere!" Lawry is also frequently late for team meetings, much to Benaud's chagrin.
- Tony Greig is Lawry's sparring partner, and often are the first two commentators of the game. A native of South Africa, Greig has a thick South African accent and is ridiculed for his heavily accented pronunciation of words like "off", "half", "broadcast". Greig carries out the pitch reports before each game, and is famous for sticking foreign objects into the pitch—usually his car keys but occasionally his Italian loafers and even a fountain pen belonging to Richie. These items often get stuck in the pitch, leading to much aggravation with the rest of the team. Greig is a relatively neutral commentator but does display a certain allegiance to South African teams.
- The Chappell brothers of Ian and Greg typically work as a pair. They are known for their calm, non-controversial demeanors.
- Max Walker is portrayed as a maniacal and unhinged personality. With his own distinct tones, Max is often caught not paying attention to the goings-on on the field. Having been sacked early in the series, many of Walker's hijinx involve his attempts to re-join the commentary team. These include the changing of his name by deed poll to Mike Walker, his kidnapping of fellow commentator Ken Sutcliffe to guarantee his own success, and his takeover of the commentary box (by force) with Benaud held hostage.
- Darrell Eastlake is shown as an over-the-top and exuberant personality, which does not always sit well with Richie. Eastlake finds it hard to contain his own excitement, as his voice will rise to a fever pitch during the announcement of a simple play or event. Despite having virtually no similarities in voice or appearance with Benaud, they are often mistaken for each other.
- Ken Sutcliffe, known as the Male Model from Mudgee, is actually voiced by Sutcliffe himself. Considerable humor is dedicated to Sutcliffe's handsome features, and is seen as being a hit with the ladies—including the wives of both Benaud and Walker. When it is announced he is a possible addition to the commentary team, Sutcliffe is kidnapped by Max Walker in order to guarantee Walker's own successes.

== Other appearances ==
During the 2005–06 Australian cricket season, the free online cricket game Stick Cricket featured commentary from The 12th Man. This was returned for the 2006–07 series and included an interview with The 12th Man by Stick Cricket fans. It features some new lines such as "And welcome back to the SCG or the MCG or the Gabba or the WACA or wherever the hell we are" and classic lines like "Got him, yes! Piss off, you're out!"

On 8 December 2006, the Twelfth Man was a guest radio DJ on Triple M for several hours choosing the music, providing comments and playing clips from Boned!

== Following ==
The 12th Man has a large following all around the world. Outside Australia, the UK probably has the most fans, with South Africa a very close second. Albums have been learned by heart by many, and Billy Birmingham is often greeted with impressions of his work. There are large groups petitioning for a new album, but Birmingham is reluctant, as his main star, Richie Benaud, had announced his retirement (eclipsed by Benaud's death on 10 April 2015), with newer commentators taking the fore.

== Discography ==
=== Studio albums ===
| Title | Album details | Peak positions | | Certifications |
| Title | Album details | AUS | NZ | Certifications |
|---|---|---|---|---|
| Wired World of Sports | Released: December 1987; Label: EMI; Format: CD, LP, cassette | 1 | — | |
| 12th Man Again! | Released: 1 February 1990; Label: EMI; Format: CD, LP, cassette | 1 | — | ARIA: Platinum |
| Still the 12th Man | Released: December 1992; Label: EMI; Format: CD, cassette | 1 | 21 | ARIA: 3× Platinum |
| Wired World of Sports II | Released: December 1994; Label: EMI; Format: CD, cassette | 1 | 6 | ARIA: 3× Platinum |
| Bill Lawry... This Is Your Life | Released: 7 December 1997; Label: EMI; Format: CD, cassette | 1 | 27 | ARIA: 3× Platinum |
| The Final Dig? | Released: 3 December 2001; Label: EMI; Format: CD | 1 | 2 | ARIA: 3× Platinum |
| Boned! | Released: 2 December 2006; Label: EMI; Format: CD, download | 1 | 5 | ARIA: 4× Platinum |

=== Compilation albums ===
| Title | Album details | Peak positions | Certifications |
| Title | Album details | AUS | Certifications |
|---|---|---|---|
| Willy Nilly: The 12th Man's Biggest Hits | Released: 22 November 2013; Label: EMI; Format: CD, download | 3 | ARIA: Platinum |
| The Very Best of Richie | Released: 27 November 2015; Label: EMI; Format: CD, download | 4 | ARIA: Platinum |

=== Box sets ===
| Title | Album details | Peak positions |
| Title | Album details | AUS |
|---|---|---|
| The Box Set | Released: 6 November 2009; Label: EMI; Format: CD, download | 17 |

=== Singles ===
| Title | Year | Peak positions | Certifications | Album |
| Title | Year | AUS | Certifications | Album |
|---|---|---|---|---|
| "It's Just Not Cricket" | 1984 | 1 | | Non-album single |
| "Marvellous!" (featuring M.C.G. Hammer) | 1992 | 1 | ARIA: Gold | Still the 12th Man |
| "Bruce 2000" | 2000 | 5 | ARIA: Gold | Non-album single |
| "Marvellous '06 (Horns Up! Mix)" | 2007 | — | | Boned! |

== Awards ==
=== ARIA Music Awards ===
The ARIA Music Awards is an annual event since 1987 celebrating Australian music and recognising outstanding artistic and technical achievements in the recording field. The Twelfth Man has won four awards.

| Year | Award | For | Result |
|---|---|---|---|
| 1988 | Best Comedy Release | Wired World of Sports | Won |
| 1991 | Best Comedy Release | The 12th Man Again | Nominated |
| 1993 | Best Comedy Release | Still the 12th Man | Nominated |
| 1995 | Best Comedy Release | Wired World of Sports II | Won |
| 1995 | Highest Selling Album | Wired World of Sports II | Won |
| 1998 | Best Comedy Release | Bill Lawry... This Is Your Life | Nominated |
| 1998 | Highest Selling Album | Bill Lawry... This Is Your Life | Nominated |
| 2001 | Best Comedy Release | "Bruce 2000" | Nominated |
| 2002 | Best Comedy Release | The Final Dig? | Won |
| 2002 | Highest Selling Album | The Final Dig? | Nominated |
| 2007 | Best Comedy Release | Boned! | Nominated |
| 2007 | Highest Selling Album | Boned! | Nominated |

== See also ==
- Warwick Todd
