= It's Just Not Cricket =

1984 single by The Twelfth Man

Single by The Twelfth Man

from the album Wired World of Sports
- Released: 1984
- Recorded: 1983–1984
- Genre: Comedy
- Label: EMI
- Songwriter: Billy Birmingham
- Producer: Billy Birmingham

The Twelfth Man singles chronology
"It's Just Not Cricket" (1984)	"Marvellous!" (1993)

"It's Just Not Cricket" is the debut single of The Twelfth Man, a series of comedy productions by skilled impersonator Billy Birmingham. The single topping the charts for three weeks in June 1984, and was the second highest selling single in Australia in 1984 behind "Dancing in the Dark" by Bruce Springsteen. The piece is centered around fictitious commentary of a match between Australia and Pakistan.

The track has never seen a full-length re-issue since the 2000 release of Wired World of Sports.

== Background and release ==
At the time of "It’s Just Not Cricket's" release, Birmingham was running his own music marketing consultancy and helping manage fellow comedian Austen Tayshus. In a 2014 interview with Sydney Morning Herald, Birmingham explains "The year before I’d written "Australiana" [also a No. 1 hit] for Austen Tayshus and I wanted to see if I could do something for myself. One day I went out in my backyard with a pencil and paper and wrote what would basically become the six or seven minutes of "It’s Just Not Cricket". Some mates came around that night and asked what I'd been doing all day. I played them the dictaphone recording and they got a good laugh out of it". adding "I’d actually worked for EMI Music back in 1975 and I had them as a client of my own business, so it was an obvious choice as to where I’d take this thing".

A track heavily based on "It's Just Not Cricket" involving a match between England and Sri Lanka was featured on the 1999 UK compilation "It's Just Not Cricket (Volumes 1 and 2)".

== Track listing ==
- Side A "It's Just Not Cricket" (Part 1) - 5:44
- Side B "It's Just Not Cricket" (Part 2) - 4:25

== Charts ==
=== Weekly charts ===
Chart (1984)	Peak position
Australian (Kent Music Report)	1

=== Year-end charts ===
Chart (1984)	Position
Australian (Kent Music Report)	2

== See also ==
- List of number-one singles in Australia during the 1980s
- List of Top 25 singles for 1984 in Australia
- List of Top 40 singles for 1980–89 in Australia
