= Mike Gibson (sports journalist) =

Australian sports journalist and commentator

- Mike Gibson Nine Network sports broadcaster for Nine's Wide World of Sports
- Born: 27 May 1940; North Sydney, New South Wales, Australia
- Died: 23 September 2015 (aged 75); Central Coast, New South Wales, Australia
- Occupations: Journalist; columnist; commentator; radio and television presenter
- Years active: 1960s−2013
- Employer(s): Radio 2SM, 2GB (1970-1981) Television, Nine Network (1981-2003)
- Known for: Wide World of Sports, Fox Sports

Mike Gibson (27 May 1940 – 23 September 2015), often also known by the nickname "Gibbo", was an Australian sports journalist, columnist, commentator, and radio and television presenter.

Following his death in 2015, media commentators and peers cited Gibson as one of Australia's greatest sports journalists, with colleagues comparing his literary prose style to international sports columnists such as Ring Lardner, Red Smith and Ian Wooldridge.

== Early career ==
Gibson began his media career as a print journalist covering greyhound racing and rugby league.

== Media and broadcasting career ==
He started in radio at 2SM, presenting there radio breakfast show in the 1970s before going to 2GB in 1979.

He moved to television at the Nine Network hosting Wide World of Sports in 1981. He also wrote a regular column for The Australian Women's Weekly, having previously written columns for two Sydney daily newspapers.

He co-hosted Good Morning Australia with Kerri-Anne Kennerley for several years from 1988.

He was an original presenter of the Nine Network's program Nine's Wide World of Sports, opposite former Australian cricket captain Ian Chappell. He hosted The Back Page, with friend and comedian Billy Birmingham, on Fox Sports for 16 years. Birmingham parodied Gibson on the program in a segment called "The Wired World of Sports".

== Awards ==
In 2007, Gibson was awarded Australian Sports Commission Media Awards Lifetime Achievement Award.

On 12 December 2021, Mike Gibson was posthumously inducted to the Sydney Cricket Ground Media Hall of Honour, alongside 11 others added to the inaugural 15 media personalities who were first celebrated in 2014.

== Personal life and death ==
Gibson separated from his wife, Helen, in 1989 and was the father of five children, including Courtney Gibson, who had also worked at the Nine Network.

Gibson, aged 75, committed suicide at his home on the Central Coast, New South Wales, on the morning of 23 September 2015 after a long period of depression.
