= Max Walker =

Australian rules footballer and cricketer

Personal information
- Full name: Maxwell Henry Norman Walker
- Born: 12 September 1948; Hobart, Tasmania, Australia
- Died: 28 September 2016 (aged 68); Melbourne, Victoria, Australia
- Nickname: Tangles
- Batting: Right-handed
- Bowling: Right-arm fast-medium
- Role: Bowler

International information
- National side: Australia
- Test debut (cap 263): v Pakistan
- Last Test: v England
- ODI debut (cap 23): v New Zealand
- Last ODI: v New Zealand

Domestic team information
- Years: Team
- 1968/69–1981/82: Victoria

Career statistics
Competition	Test	ODI	FC	LA
Matches	34	17	135	41
Runs scored	586	79	2,014	261
Batting average	19.53	9.87	15.49	15.35
100s/50s	0/1	0/0	0/3	0/0
Top score	78*	20	78*	31
Balls bowled	10,094	1006	31,647	2,425
Wickets	138	20	499	52
Bowling average	27.47	27.30	26.47	25.28
5 wickets in innings	6	0	21	0
10 wickets in match	0	0	0	0
Best bowling	8/143	4/19	8/143	4/19
Catches/stumpings	12/–	6/–	49/–	9/–
Medal record
Men's Cricket
Representing Australia
ICC Cricket World Cup
Runner-up	1975 England
- Source: ESPNcricinfo, 17 June 2014
Australian rules football career
Playing career
Years	Club	Games (Goals)
1967-72	Melbourne	85 (23)

Maxwell Henry Norman Walker AM (12 September 1948 – 28 September 2016) was an Australian sportsman who played both cricket and Australian rules football at high levels. After six years of balancing first-class cricket in summer, professional football in winter and study for a degree in architecture, Walker earned a place in the Australian cricket team in 1972 and represented his country in the sport until injury ended his career in 1981. Following his retirement, he worked as an architect and also commenced a career in radio and television media. He wrote 14 books over a period of thirty years and became a successful public speaker. His unorthodox cricket bowling action earned him the nickname "Tangles", and his larrikin character made him a much-loved figure with the Australian public. Walker died of multiple myeloma on 28 September 2016 after being diagnosed with the disease three years earlier. He was a part of the Australian squad which finished as runners-up at the 1975 Cricket World Cup.

== Early life and education ==
Walker was born in Hobart, Tasmania, on 12 September 1948. While in high school he represented Tasmania as an opening batsman in their colts team, scoring a century in one match. As a schoolboy at The Friends' School, Hobart, Walker was vice-captain of the firsts cricket team, played Aussie Rules football and was a talented junior athlete for his school. He also played for North Hobart Cricket Club and North Hobart Football Club as a junior. After graduating from Friends' School in 1967 he relocated to Melbourne to play football and also enrolled in an architecture degree at the Royal Melbourne Institute of Technology. He graduated with a fellowship diploma in 1973.

== Football career ==
In 1966, while still a high school student, Melbourne Football Club coach Norm Smith visited Walker's family home in Hobart to sign him to the Demons. He relocated from Hobart to Melbourne in 1967 and made his VFL debut the same year. He spent six seasons with Melbourne, playing 85 games (Note: Some sources state 93 games.) as a ruckman and defender and earning one Brownlow Medal vote in 1968. After returning from the Australian cricket team's 1972–73 tour of the West Indies, Walker informed the club that he would not be joining them for the 1973 VFL season, as the season was about to start and he needed to complete a thesis for his university degree.

== Cricket career ==
Upon moving to Melbourne in 1967, Walker joined the Melbourne Cricket Club. Although he earned a reputation as a batsman as a junior, he was given an opportunity to open the bowling attack for Melbourne, which showed his true cricket potential. His strange bowling action, bowling right arm over his right leg, earned Walker the nickname of "Tanglefoot" which was quickly shortened to "Tangles". He made his first-class debut for Victoria in February 1969 against Queensland, the final match of Victoria's 1968–1969 Sheffield Shield season. Despite taking five wickets in the match, he did not get a chance to play in the 1969–1970 season due to the depth in Victoria's bowling. He earned a second match in December 1970 and became a regular in the 1971–72 season, playing a total of 135 matches for Victoria.

He made his test debut for Australia in the second Test against Pakistan that commenced on 29 December 1972. He took five wickets in the match and retained his place in the team for the next match, the final of the series. In that match, a final innings performance of 6–15 by Walker prevented Pakistan from winning the match. During the series he was selected for Australia's tour of the West Indies that ran from February to April 1973.

Walker played a total of 34 Tests, taking 138 wickets as a medium-fast bowler. He played in 17 ODIs between 1974 and 1981, as well as playing in the breakaway World Series Cricket from 1977 to 1979. His final match for Australia was the infamous underarm match between Australia and New Zealand on 1 February 1981. An Achilles tendon injury subsequently forced his retirement from cricket.

== Post-retirement from cricket ==
After retiring from competitive cricket in 1981, Walker practised architecture for 10 years. He also became a highly regarded for his work in the media, including television and radio. He was also a successful author and public speaker.

=== Media career ===
Once he retired from cricket, Walker first appeared on radio, calling cricket for the Australian Broadcasting Corporation (ABC) with Drew Morphett and Alan McGilvray for four years from 1981. He was also part of the commercial radio cricket coverage run by 2UE and 3AK. His first television appearances date back to 1982, where he was the cricket expert on Channel 7's World of Sport. After moving to Channel 9 in 1985, he was also part of National Nine News Melbourne with Brian Naylor, reading sports reports on the nightly news. He also hosted the Nine Network's The Sunday Footy Show from 1993–1998 and Nine's Wide World of Sports program until it was cancelled in 1999. He was also a commentator for Channel Nine's cricket matches between 1985 and 1991. In 2005 he appeared on the Nine Network's sports show Any Given Sunday, hosted by James Brayshaw, as well as ABC2's sports program Late Night Legends featuring highlights of the 1974–75 Ashes series in which Walker had a prominent role.

Walker's distinctive broad Australian accent was parodied in several albums by The Twelfth Man (Billy Birmingham), including being featured as the central character on the 1994 album Wired World of Sports II. It follows Walker through a day at his job at the Nine Network in which he assaults co-host Ken Sutcliffe in order to increase his chances of regaining a place on the cricket commentary team.

He also appeared in television advertisements throughout his career, commencing with an Aerogard commercial in the mid-1970s. He also made a guest appearance on Red Faces for an episode of Hey Hey It's Saturday.

=== Writing career ===
Max Walker was also the author of 14 books, with total sales exceeding one million copies. His first book, Tangles (written with Neil Phillipson), was an autobiography published in 1976. His subsequent books contained light-hearted anecdotes from his career, with titles such as The Wit of Walker, How to Kiss a Crocodile and How to Puzzle a Python. His final book Caps, Hats and Helmets was released in 2006.

=== Public speaking ===
Following the cancellation of Nine's Wide World of Sports in 1999, Walker commenced appearing on the public speaking circuit. He turned it into a successful business and continued speaking until at least 2015. Walker held the designation of Certified Speaking Professional, which is the highest accreditation within Professional Speakers Australia. In 2016, he presented a keynote address at the Professional Speakers Australia annual convention. He received the Educator of the Year award from Professional Speakers Australia at that same convention.

== Honours ==
On 13 June 2011, Walker was named a Member of the Order of Australia for service to cricket at a national and international level as a player and commentator, and to the community through a range of youth and social welfare organisations.

== Personal life ==
Walker was married twice and had five children: three sons from his first marriage, and two daughters with his second wife Kerry. He was an avid collector of fountain pens and featured in one episode of the ABC's Collectors. Walker died from multiple myeloma on 28 September 2016, after being diagnosed in August 2013.

== Bibliography ==
Books authored or co-authored by Walker:

- Tangles (1976), with Neill Phillipson, ISBN 095970986X
- Cricketer at the Crossroads (1978), with Neill Phillipson, ISBN 0908081405
- Back to Bay 13 (1980), ISBN 0908081804
- The Wit of Walker (1983), with Mike Coward, ISBN 0908081499
- How to Hypnotise Chooks (1987), ISBN 0908081510
- How to Tame Lions (1988), ISBN 0908081758
- How to Kiss a Crocodile (1989), ISBN 0908081839
- How to Puzzle a Python (1990), ISBN 0908081367
- The best of Mr Walker (1992), ISBN 0947334513
- A Chip Off the Old Block (1996), ISBN 0947334823
- Sports Jokes (1997), with Brian Doyle, ISBN 0947334823
- Ladies and Gentlemen (1999), with Mike McColl Jones, ISBN 1865080802
- The Volunteers (2001), with Gerry Gleeson, ISBN 1865085685
- Caps, Hats and Helmets (2006), ISBN 0975791109

== See also ==
- List of Australian rules footballers and cricketers
