= Billy Birmingham =

Australian comedian and journalist (born 1953)

Billy Birmingham (born 5 July 1953) is an Australian humorist and sometimes sports journalist, most noted for his parodies of Australian cricket commentary in recordings under The Twelfth Man name.

== Early career ==
He wrote the pun-laden comedy hit "Australiana", which was made famous by performer Austen Tayshus and reached No. 1, ultimately becoming the most successful single on the Australian charts in 1983.

== The Twelfth Man ==
In 1984 he released his first record as The Twelfth Man, titled "It's Just Not Cricket". This went on to become his most successful series of recordings, with eight albums being released between 1987 and 2006. The premise involved Birmingham impersonating and satirizing the Channel Nine cricket commentary team, particularly Richie Benaud, Bill Lawry and Tony Greig.

During the Sydney 2000 Olympics, Birmingham also recorded a series of mock-commentaries on Olympic events as the Wired World of Sports, featuring such characters as the American track-and-field representative "Chuck DeWobblee" ("chucked a wobbly" – meaning to throw a tantrum) and the Ukrainian pole-vaulter "Olga Bedjanodgonnagedova" ("bet you're not gonna get over"), while also releasing the single under the 12th Man name, "Bruce 2000", featuring an impersonation of famed commentator Bruce McAvaney during the Sydney 2000 Olympic Games.

Birmingham has commented on his relationship with Richie Benaud, stating that he was kind when meeting with him, but a problem he had with his albums was the amount of obscenities he used when impersonating him, and that he thought it didn't reflect him personally. He has also stated that his favorite person to impersonate was Richie Benaud, as well as stating that over the years that things associated with the 12th Man have become conflated with Richie Benaud. Specifically, the 12th Man's interpretation of Benaud's Two for twenty two phrase, saying that Benaud never said that—apart from when it was the score.

== The Back Page ==
In 1997, Birmingham joined as a regular guest on the panel discussion show The Back Page, alongside host Mike Gibson. Ironically, Gibson was sent up by Birmingham in 1987 on his Twelfth Man album Wired World of Sports.

Birmingham is famous for being able to find humour amid the hyperbole of world sport. Following Michael Clarke's debut innings of 151 against India in 2004, there was considerable praise for him – including comments that the young man was the new Donald Bradman and that he should captain Australia. Birmingham announced on The Back Page that he was going to nominate Clarke for Australian of the Year: "He's just that good."

A skilled impersonator, Birmingham is also used on the show as a means of interviewing a sporting celebrity who is otherwise unavailable. His impression of Australian rugby union coach Eddie Jones following the decision to award a Super Rugby franchise to Perth was a prime example of this, even to the point that another panelist held Birmingham's left eyebrow in place in order to have him look like the man he was pretending to be. At one point, Birmingham even began an impression of Gibson, which he quickly ceased performing, upon deciding (tongue-in-cheek) that it might endanger his career. He also is well known for spontaneously impersonating Richie Benaud during discussions about cricket, having once said during a debate about Twenty20 cricket, "Why not twenty-two overs for the two sides?" (taking advantage of Benaud's characteristic pronunciation of the letters T and S). In the lead-up to the Melbourne Cup, Birmingham also frequently adopts the distinctive high-pitched voice of a jockey.

Birmingham is also known for his ability to cover up any ignorance he might have of players' names by creating new ones in keeping with the country in question. For example, a discussion about the New Zealand national rugby league team collapsed into laughter when Birmingham praised, among others, the performance of "the centre, Waisiwerina Silitupe" ("Why's he wearing a silly toupee?").

In December 2012, Birmingham quit the show soon after Mike Gibson's departure, with the incumbents on the show being Matt Shirvington ('The Lunchbox') and Tony Squires.

== List of impersonations ==
Personalities he has mimicked include:

- Tony Barber
- Jimmy Barnes
- Darren Beadman
- Richie Benaud
- David Boon
- Allan Border
- Ian Botham
- Geoff Boycott
- Don Bradman
- Gordon Bray
- James Brayshaw
- Billy Brownless
- George W. Bush
- Ken Callander
- Bob Carr
- Greg Chappell
- Ian Chappell
- Bill Clinton
- Dennis Commetti
- Ben Cousins
- Colin Croft
- Hansie Cronje
- Robert DiPierdomenico
- Darrell Eastlake
- John Farnham
- Jeff Fenech
- Brendan Fevola
- Danny Frawley
- Gary Freeman
- Bob Fulton
- Sunil Gavaskar
- Jack Gibson
- Mike Gibson
- Adam Gilchrist
- Graham Gooch
- Phil Gould
- David Gower
- Tony Greig
- Michael Gudinski
- Osher Gunsberg
- Ian Healy
- Michael Holding
- Andrew Johns
- Alan Jones
- Eddie Jones
- Jeff Kennett
- Imran Khan
- Bill Lawry
- John Laws
- David Leckie
- Wally Lewis
- Dennis Lillee
- David Lloyd
- Garry Lyon
- Justin Madden
- Rod Marsh
- Ray Martin
- Greg Matthews
- Ian Maurice
- Norman May
- Bruce McAvaney
- Jarrod McCracken
- Alan McGilvray
- Eddie McGuire
- Javed Miandad
- Erin Molan
- Rex Mossop
- Mike Munro
- Sam Newman
- Mark Nicholas
- Simon O'Donnell
- Frank Packer
- Kerry Packer
- John Platten
- Peter Pollock
- Ricky Ponting
- Steve Roach
- Sandy Roberts
- Roy and HG
- Yvonne Sampson
- Barry Sheene
- Michael Slater
- Ken Sparkes
- Keith Stackpole
- Karl Stefanovic
- Peter Sterling
- Ken Sutcliffe
- Johnny Tapp
- Mark Taylor
- Jeff Thomson
- Tony Trabert
- Kostya Tszyu
- Frank Tyson
- Paul Vautin
- Andrew Voss
- Jim Waley
- Max Walker
- Doug Walters
- Shane Warne
- Ray Warren
- Mark Waugh
- Steve Waugh
- Neville Wran
- Former Australian prime ministers Bob Hawke, Paul Keating, John Howard, and Kevin Rudd
- Plus many other iconic people.

== Other ==
Birmingham has also used his impersonation skills on advertisements for KFC, which appeared on Channel Nine's cricket coverage in the summer of 2002/03.

He also worked on Sydney radio station 2GB 873 alongside Andrew Moore and fellow long-time The Back Page panelist Mike Gibson.
