= Nine's Wide World of Sports =

Australian sports anthology series

- Network: Nine Network
- Launched: 1956
- Country of origin: Australia
- Owner: Nine Entertainment Co.
- Headquarters: North Sydney, New South Wales
- Major broadcasting contracts: NRL; NRL Women's; State of Origin; Super Rugby; Super W Bledisloe Cup; Wallabies Internationals; The Rugby Championship; English Premier League; English FA Cup; British and Irish Lions; Summer Olympics; Winter Olympics; Australian Open; ATP Cup; French Open; Wimbledon; US Open; Melbourne Cup; Suncorp Super Netball; Netball World Cup; Australian Diamonds Internationals; National Basketball League; Women's National Basketball League
- Formerly known as: National Nine Sports (1977–1982)
- Sister network: Nine Network; 9Gem; 9Go! 9Now
- Official website: www.nine.com.au/sport

Nine's Wide World of Sports is a long running sports anthology brand on Australian television that airs on the Nine Network and streaming service Stan. All major sports, events and series covered by the network are broadcast under this brand, the flagship sports being rugby league (National Rugby League), rugby union (Super Rugby and Wallabies international matches) and Grand Slam tennis (Australian Open, French Open, Wimbledon, US Open), the Summer Olympics and Winter Olympics and the Paralympic Games, and spring horse racing (Melbourne Cup). Previous sporting rights include the Australian rules football (Australian Football League), Australian Cricket Team home season, autumn horse racing, swimming until 2008, and golf (US Masters) since 2018.

== History ==
=== 1981–1990s – Creation and contract competition ===
Wide World of Sports (WWoS) is a long-used title for Nine's sport programming. All sports broadcasts on Nine air under the WWoS brand. It was also the name of a popular sports magazine program that aired most Saturdays and Sundays. This program filled many of the summer daytime hours. It was first pitched by David Hill who went on to hold a broad portfolio in WWoS. The program premiered at 1:00 pm on Saturday, 23 May 1981, and was initially hosted by Mike Gibson and Ian Chappell, before being hosted in the 1990s by Max Walker and Ken Sutcliffe. Ian Maurice was the regular anchor at the WWOS Update Desk. The show ended in 1999, due in large part to the rise of Fox Sports (which Nine's owner owned half of) and other subscription sport channels, but the show returned in 2008 on Sunday mornings.

It was unrelated to the series Wide World of Sports aired by ABC in the United States, which started in 1961. From the late 1970s, the main sport aired nationally under the WWoS brand was cricket. Nine's majority owner Kerry Packer created World Series Cricket in part because he couldn't obtain the rights to Australian test matches at home, even though he offered the Australian Cricket Board a $1.5 million three year contract which was rejected by the ACB who signed a three year deal with the ABC to broadcast test matches. This led to Packer signing in secret some of the world's best cricket players for a breakaway competition.

In 1977, 35 of the "world's best players" had signed with Packer's World Series Cricket, which was broadcast in competition with ABC's cricket coverage of the ICC. Nine's Wide World of Sports was the "first broadcaster to put a microphone on the players for an international cricket match," which later became common practice in the industry. ABC and Nine then signed a truce after a long dispute in 1979, with Nine securing the exclusive rights to telecast Australian cricket. From that point until 2006, Nine based its summer schedule around broadcasts of cricket internationally and domestic. Its cricket broadcasts in that era revolutionized the way the sport was covered, featuring cameras placed at both ends of the field (after Packer famously complained about seeing "cricketer's bums" every second over), instant replays, and other innovations. World Series Cricket made many other changes to cricket, having a huge impact on the game.

David Hill was among the early executives that developed WWoS. In the early 1980s, well-known hosts and presenters on Wide World of Sports included Mike Gibson and Ian Chappell, both the inaugural hosts of the Saturday afternoon program in 1981.

Billy Birmingham in 1984 released a comedy album that satirized cricket "and in particular Channel Nine's iconic commentary team with Richie Benaud the central figure," which became popular in Australia, called The Wired World of Sports. Among the hosts satirized were his friend Mike Gibson. Birmingham went on to release a series of albums ridiculing all aspects of Wide World of Sports, calling the show "Wired World of Sports". From the first to the most recent (2006), all have reached number one on the Australian album chart.

David Hill helped establish Nine's Wide World of Sports early on, and was a "sounding board when the billionaire famously sold the network to Alan Bond and then bought it back three years later for less than a quarter of the price." Writes the Sydney Morning Herald, "Packer's decision to sell Nine to Bond in 1987 for $1.2 billion - before buying back the network in 1990 for $250 million - is legendary in Australian television." Other early broadcasters at WWoS included Ron Casey.

January 1995 saw the beginning of Premier Sports Network, the channel that was to become Fox Sports. It secured the rights to Australia's cricket tour of the West Indies, Nine's first challenge since winning its World Series war. Nine tried to stop the broadcast under Australia's "anti-siphoning" rules, which exist to stop certain popular sporting events being screened exclusively on pay television. But it failed when Premier Sports Network came to an agreement to broadcast the tour free to air on Network 10.

WWoS's other main sport was and is rugby league. This was challenged in 1997 by the establishment of Super League, the repercussions of which led to Nine's parent company owning half of Fox Sports that year, and ultimately Nine's move away from popular live sport. This partial purchase of Fox Sports roughly coincided with the end of Nine's traditional Saturday and Sunday daytime schedule of sports programming. What had once filled it now filled subscription channels, mainly Fox Sports. Old movies and other low rating programs filled much of the space. Between the late 1970s and 1997, when Australians had wanted to watch continuous sport at home on a summer weekend, they had largely done so by tuning to Nine. Those in New South Wales, Queensland and the Australian Capital Territory did this all year round, due to rugby league's popularity in those areas. Now Fox Sports had that mantle, and gave viewers continuous sport all week long.

In the 1990s, the Wide World of Sports marketed sports paraphernalia such as signed and framed bats, and items from the Australian Rugby League.

Paul Sheahan hosted Nine's Wide World of Sports program until 1999. Max Walker hosted until it ended in 1999.

=== 2000–2008 – Changing broadcasting deals ===
In 2001, The Nine Network acquired broadcast rights for Friday night and Sunday afternoon games in the Australian Football League, the elite Australian rules football competition in 2001. Seven had previously held the TV rights for 44 years prior. They shared the rights with Network Ten and Foxtel from 2002 through to 2006, but the deal assigned exclusive rights for the finals series to Ten, a deal which reportedly flabbergasted Nine boss Kerry Packer.

As it also had the rights for all major swimming competitions until 2008, major swimming competitions were shown in primetime. During the early to mid-2000s, Nine for the first time had the FTA rights to the highest competitions of Australia's four biggest spectator sports: rugby league, Australian rules (shared with Ten), cricket and swimming. While Nine no longer had the volume of sport it once had, during the 2000-2006 period it dominated non-Olympic sport broadcasting in Australia.

With existing agreements then set to expire in 2006 and 2007, in 2005, Channel Nine secured a deal to air NRL games until the end of 2012.

Eddie McGuire was named CEO of Nine Network with oversight of the Wide World of Sports brand in 2006.

In January 2006, the Seven Network and Network Ten exercised their "first and last" rights agreement with the AFL to trump the Nine Network's $780 million bid for broadcasting rights for the years 2007 to 2011. If Seven and Ten were unable to match the AFL's "quality of coverage" demands by 5 May 2006 (better coverage into regional areas, northern states and on pay television, as promised in the Nine bid) the AFL would have been allowed to award the broadcasting rights back to Nine.

The Seven/Ten consortium, however, obtained the rights, with Nine broadcasting its last AFL match on Sunday 3 September 2006. The match was hosted by Tony Jones with a guest appearance from Nine's then chief executive and former AFL commentator Eddie McGuire.

In 2004, it was making an annual income of around $30 million on broadcasting Australian cricket, with the television rights expiring at the end of the 2006. Around 2004, Cricket Australia began negotiating for a higher price. In 2005, Nine Network bid on cricket for $45 million a year, winning the contract and signing a seven year deal with Cricket Australia.

From the beginning of the 2006-2007 cricket season, Nine no longer broadcast Australian domestic cricket.

In 2012, Nine Network had a $1 billion contract for NRL rights and a $300 million cricket rights deal set to expire the following March.

Instead, it replaced the coverage with delayed National Basketball League matches in October, with weekly one-hour highlight shows and full games. The domestic cricket matches, long a mainstay of Nine's summer programming, moved exclusively to Fox Sports.

=== 2008–2020: return of Wide World of Sports ===
After a ten-year hiatus, it was announced that the Wide World of Sports weekly television program would return to Nine on 16 March 2008, using the same theme song as the old version, as well as accessing old footage for replays. This show was hosted by the previous host Ken Sutcliffe, with footy show star James Brayshaw as well as former Australian cricketer Adam Gilchrist. Revolving co-hosts included former swimmers Giaan Rooney, Nicole Livingstone and former cricketer Michael Slater. That year, it broadcast the Australian Open with its own team of commentators. The show originally aired for 90 minutes but was recently extended to two hours. It aired on Sunday mornings at 9am till 11am.

In 2008, the Nine Network and Microsoft joint venture ninemsn had a section dedicated to the Wide World of Sports. In 2009, Grant Hackett and Michael Slater joined the team as co-hosts alongside Sutcliffe and Rooney. Livingstone did not return, as she joined Network Ten as a commentator. Rooney resigned from the Nine Network at the end of 2012 to join the Seven Network. It was thought that the Seven Network would continue its tradition of airing the Olympic Games for the 2012 Summer Olympics in London. However, Nine in joint partnership with Foxtel, has secured broadcasting rights which the network has described as the most comprehensive coverage of the Olympics. The partnership also won the rights to the 2010 Winter Olympics in Vancouver.

For 34 years, the Nine Network had also broadcast the prestigious Wimbledon tennis tournament before ultimately dropping it after the 2010 tournament, citing declining ratings. The last Wimbledon match televised by Nine was the men's singles final played between Rafael Nadal and Tomáš Berdych, which Nadal won. The Seven Network have gained broadcasting rights to Wimbledon, from 2011 until 2019 except for 2020 due to covid virus. The Australian Rugby League Commission in August 2012 agreed to a five-year broadcast deal in Australia with Nine Entertainment to air on its Wide World of Sports brand, and for $1.025 billion, was the "most lucrative agreement in rugby league history."

In 2013, the Wide World of Sports brand was facing challenges from other television networks its broadcast rights to Cricket Australia. Nine had a contract clause, however, so that if it were to "match the highest offer means it is still expected to retain the rights, despite its exclusive window for negotiations having closed." With Nine Network's cricket coverage winning in 1982, the television show won "Most Popular Sports Program" at the Logie Awards in 1986. It was nominated for the "Most Popular Sports Coverage" award at the 2009, 2010, 2013, 2014 and 2015 Logie Awards, being beaten by The NRL Footy Show on all occasions.

Until 2016, Steve Crawley was the rugby league boss at Wide World of Sports, when he was hired by FOX Sports. He was replaced by Tom Malone as Director of Sport. After she was fired in 2014 as a cost-cutting measure, in 2016 Emma Freedman again signed up with Channel Nine's Wide World of Sports as an announcer. The weekly show was no longer airing as of 2017. Sports Sunday replaced the show in the Sunday 10am time slot.

In 2017, the WWoS channel was featuring the Netball World Series, hosted by Erin Molan and with commentators Liz Ellis, Sharelle McMahon, Cath Cox and Anne Sargeant. In 2017, the channel signed Ray Warren for five more years, for as long as they retained their rugby league rights. Also that year, WWoS announced a GPS player tracking system into its rugby league broadcasting. WWoS relinquished the rights broadcast cricket in 2018 to Seven West Media, instead picking up the Australian Open tennis broadcast for that summer. In 2019, the WWoS was streaming rugby league on its digital platform, with a rugby league commentary team led by Ray Warren. In 2018, WWoS announced had secured "free TV and streaming rights" for the Masters Tournament to be played at Augusta National Golf Club.

The Wide World of Sports studio was set up in Melbourne for the 2019 Australian Open for tennis, with a commentary team headed up by John McEnroe and Jim Courier. Originally Wide World of Sports had been set to air it for 2020 until 2024, but they were sold the 2019 broadcast rights by Seven Network. Nine's Wide World of Sports in 2019 included the Australian Open, "the Sydney International, Brisbane International and Hopman Cup tennis tournaments, the Holden State of Origin, the Cricket World Cup, the Ashes, The Masters and the NBL."

Macquarie Media in 2020 began airing an hour-long Wide World of Sports radio broadcast hosted by Mark Levy. Also in April 2020, WWoS introduced a new show on the Australian Open, hosted by Todd Woodbridge and Sam Groth, titled the Greatest Australian Open Matches. In 2020, the National Rugby League and Nine resolved a contract dispute over scheduling.

=== 2020–present: rugby and tennis expansion, Olympics and Paralympics, Stan Sport, Melbourne Cup ===
In November 2020, Nine Entertainment Co. acquired rights to Rugby Australia, as well as the French Open and The Championships, Wimbledon, with plans for pay-television coverage (ad-free and on-demand) to migrate to a new sport-oriented package on its subscription streaming service Stan, and selected matches/events to be broadcast free on the Nine Network.

On 8 February 2023, it was announced that Nine had re-gained the rights to the Olympic Games from 2024 through to the 2032 Summer Olympics in Brisbane. On 20 February 2024, it was announced Nine had obtained the rights to broadcast the Melbourne Cup from 2024 through to 2029.

In January 2025, the 9Network announced they had partnered with the Invictus Games Foundation as the official Australian broadcaster of the Invictus Games Vancouver Whistler 2025, presented by ATCO and Boeing.

In April 2026, Nine announced it would become an official Australian broadcast partner for the National Basketball League, with the Hungry Jack's NBL 2018/19 season to tip off on Thursday, October 11. The new three year sport rights deal will be a revenue sharing arrangement with an agreement to air two games per round on Nine multichannel 9GO!.

== Events ==
Nine's Wide World of Sports holds broadcast rights to the following events:

=== Current ===
| Sport | Event | Broadcast partner(s) | Dates | Notes |
|---|---|---|---|---|
| Summer Paralympics | Paris 2024, Los Angeles 2028, Brisbane 2032 | Stan Sport | 2024, 2028, 2032 | |
| Winter Paralympics | Milan Cortina 2026, French Alps 2030 | Stan Sport | 2026, 2030 | |
| Summer Youth Olympics | Dakar, Senegal 2026 | | 2026 | Opening & Closing ceremonies Live on 9Go! Every event on Stan. |
| Winter Youth Olympics | Gangwon, South Korea 2024 | | 2024 | Opening & Closing ceremonies Live on 9Go! Every event on Stan. |
| Summer Olympics | Melbourne 1956, Rome 1960, Tokyo 1964, Mexico 1968, Munich 1972, Montreal 1976, London 2012, Paris 2024, Los Angeles 2028, Brisbane 2032 | ABC (1956–1976), 0-10 Network 1968 Seven Network (1956–1976), Foxtel (2012) Stan Sport (2024–) | 1956, 1972, 1976, 2012, 2024, 2028, 2032 | |
| Winter Olympics | Sarajevo 1984, Calgary 1988, Albertville 1992, Lillehammer 1994, Vancouver 2010, Milan Cortina 2026, French-Alps 2030 | Foxtel (2010) Stan Sport (2026–) | 1984, 1988, 1992, 1994, 2010, 2026, 2030 | |
| Basketball | National Basketball League | Fox Sports (2007, 2015–2016, 2018–2019); ESPN / Disney+ (2026–present) | 2007, 2015–2016, 2018–2019, 2026–present | Live 2 matches on Saturday night on 9Go! |
| Basketball | Women's National Basketball League | ESPN (2022–present) / Disney+ (2025–present) | 2022–present | All remaining matches LIVE every weekend on 9Now |
| Basketball | Australian Opals | ESPN (2026–present) / Disney+ (2026–present) | 2026-present | Home matches on 9Go! |
| Golf | Australian Open | Fox Sports | 2022–present | Live coverage on Nine & 9Now |
| Golf | Australian PGA Championship | Fox Sports | 2022–present | Live coverage on Nine & 9Now |
| Horse racing | Melbourne Cup Carnival | Sky Racing, Racing.com | 2024–present | Live coverage on Nine & 9Now |
| Horse Racing | Spring Racing Carnival | Sky Racing, Racing.com | 2024–present | Live coverage on Nine & 9Now |
| Ice hockey | National Hockey League | ESPN | 2025–present | Live every Saturday on 9Go! |
| Invictus Games | Birmingham 2027 | | 2025–present | Live coverage on 9Gem & 9Now |
| Motor racing | IndyCar Series | Fox Sports, ESPN (1990s), Stan Sport | 1990-1995 2022-present | Highlights on 9Go! Live coverage On Stan Sport |
| Motor racing | Indianapolis 500 | Stan Sport | 1980s-2000 2022-present | Highlights on 9Go! Live coverage On Stan Sport |
| Motor racing | Formula E World Championship | Stan Sport | 2022–present | Highlights on 9Go! Live coverage On Stan Sport |
| Motor racing | World Endurance Championship | Stan Sport | 2022–present | Highlights on 9Go! Live coverage On Stan Sport |
| Motor racing | 24 Hours of Le Mans | Stan Sport | 1980s–1990s 2022–present | Live coverage the first 2 hours race On 9Go! |
| Netball | INF Netball World Cup | Stan Sport (2027) | 2019, 2027 | Key matches and most finals |
| Netball | Suncorp Super Netball | Stan Sport (2027) | 2017–2021, 2027-present | Select matches; all finals |
| Netball | Australian Diamonds Internationals | Stan Sport (2027) | 2017–2021, 2027-present | Every Match Live |
| Netball | Constellation Cup | Stan Sport (2027) | 2017–2021, 2027-present | |
| Rugby league | National Rugby League | Seven Network (1971–1972) Network Ten (1983, 1988–1991), ABC (1961–1972) (1983), (1992–1995) Fox Sports (1997–present) | 1961–1972, 1983, 1992–present | 3 live matches each week. Last 5 Saturday Night matches - Round 23-27 All finals matches live including grand final. All 3 matches shown LIVE on 9Gem in WA, SA, VIC & TAS. |
| Rugby league | NRL Women's | Fox Sports | 2018–present | All Matches LIVE on 9HD or 9Gem; Starting from 2028 3 matches per week will be shown on free to air |
| Rugby league | Harvey Norman All-Stars Men | Fox Sports | 2010–present | Live on Nine |
| Rugby league | Harvey Norman All-Stars Women | Fox Sports | 2011–present | Live on Nine |
| Rugby league | State of Origin | Fox Sports (Highlights) | 1983–1989, 1991–present | Live on Nine |
| Rugby league | Women's State of Origin | Fox Sports (Highlights) | 2018–present | Live on Nine |
| Rugby league | The Kangaroos | Fox Sports | 1983–1989 (Home Tests 1983–1988) (NZ Trans Tasman Tests 1983–1989) 1994–present (All Tests) | Every Match Live |
| Rugby league | The Jillaroos | Fox Sports | 2015–present | Every Match Live |
| Rugby league | Prime Minister's XIII | Fox Sports | 2022–present | Every Match Live |
| Rugby league | International Rugby League | Fox Sports | 2018–present | Selected Matches Live |
| Rugby league | The Ashes | Fox Sports | 2025–present | Every Match Live |
| Rugby league | NRL Schoolboy Cup | The Daily Telegraph | 2025-present | Grand Final Only |
| Rugby union | Super Rugby Pacific | Stan Sport | 2021–present | Saturday night match LIVE each round. All finals games live including grand final. |
| Rugby union | Super W | Stan Sport | 2021–present | Saturday double-header match LIVE each round. All finals games live including grand final LIVE. |
| Rugby union | Bledisloe Cup | Fox Sports (2011–2012), Stan Sport (2021–present) | 2011–2012, 2021–present | Every Match Live |
| Rugby union | Wallabies Rugby internationals | Fox Sports (2011–2012), Stan Sport (2021–present) | 2011–2012, 2021–present | Every Match Live |
| Rugby union | Wallaroos Rugby internationals | Stan Sport (2021–present) | 2021–present | Every Match Live |
| Rugby union | The Rugby Championship | Fox Sports (2011–2012), Stan Sport (2021–present) | 2011–2012, 2021–present | Australian Matches Live on Nine. |
| Rugby union | Shute Shield | Stan Sport | 2021–present | Four games broadcast Live on Nine throughout the season; plus 1 finals match each weekend; into NSW only |
| Rugby union | Hospital Cup | Stan Sport | 2021–present | Four games broadcast Live on Nine throughout the season; plus 1 finals match each weekend; into Queensland only |
| Rugby union | Nations Championship | Fox Sports (2011–2012), Stan Sport (2026–present) | 2011–2012, 2026–present | Australian matches Live on Nine. |
| Rugby union | British and Irish Lions | Stan Sport | 2021, 2025 | 2021 in South Africa Matches on Stan 2025 in Australia Test Matches Live On Nine Other Matches On Stan Sport |
| Rugby union | Rugby World Cup | Stan Sport | 2023, 2027 | All Australian Matches LIVE On Nine Other Matches On Stan Sport |
| Rugby union | Women's Rugby World Cup | Stan Sport | 2025, 2029 | All Australian Matches LIVE On Nine Other Matches On Stan Sport |
| Soccer | UEFA Champions League | Stan Sport | 2021–present | Live and free coverage of final only. All other matches on Stan Sport. |
| Soccer | UEFA Europa League | Stan Sport | 2021–present | Live and free coverage of final only. All other matches on Stan Sport. |
| Soccer | UEFA Conference League | Stan Sport | 2021–present | Live and free coverage of final only. All other matches on Stan Sport. |
| Soccer | UEFA Super Cup | Stan Sport | 2021–present | Live coverage on Nine/9Gem. |
| Soccer | English Premier League | Stan Sport | 2025–present | 1 game per week live on Nine/9Gem. All other matches on Stan Sport. |
| Soccer | English FA Cup | Stan Sport | 2025–present | 1 game per week and the final live on Nine/9Gem. All other matches on Stan Sport. |
| Swimming | Australian Swimming Trials | | 2025-present | |
| Swimming | Australian Swimming Championships | | 1985–2008, 2023–present | |
| Swimming | FINA World Swimming Championships | | 2022-present | |
| Tennis | Australian Open | Stan Sport | 2019–present | Live coverage on Nine and 9Gem. Every match on 9Now. |
| Tennis | French Open | Stan Sport | 2003–2009, 2021–present | Only 1 match live at a time on Nine/9Gem. All matches on Stan Sport. |
| Tennis | Wimbledon Championships | Stan Sport | 1977–2010, 2021–present | Only 1 match live at a time on Nine/9Gem. All matches on Stan Sport. |
| Tennis | U.S. Open | Fox Sports (2000s); Stan Sport (2022–) | 1980s–2009, 2022–present | Only 1 match live at a time on Nine/9Gem. All matches on Stan Sport. |
| Tennis | United Cup | Stan Sport | 2022–present | Live coverage on Nine/9Gem |
| Tennis | Adelaide International | Stan Sport | 2020–present | Live coverage on Nine/9Go! |
| Tennis | Brisbane International | Stan Sport | 2019–present | Live coverage on Nine/9Go! |
| Tennis | Hobart International | Stan Sport | 2020–present | Live coverage on Nine/9Go! |
| Tennis | Billie Jean King Cup | beIN Sports | 2023–present | Australia Matches only |
| Tennis | Davis Cup | beIN Sports | 2018–present | Australian matches only, starting with the World Group play-offs vs Austria. Exclusive coverage for qualifiers in 2020. |
| Yachting | Sydney to Hobart Yacht Race | | 2024–present | Live coverage on Nine |

=== Past ===
| Sport | Event | Broadcast partner(s) | Dates |
|---|---|---|---|
| American football | National Football League | ESPN | 1990s |
| American football | Super Bowl | ESPN | 1990s |
| Australian rules football | E. J. Whitten Legends Game | | 1996–2015 |
| Australian rules football | Australian Football League | Network Ten (2002–2006), Fox Footy Channel (2002–2006) | 2002–2006 |
| Australian rules football | International Rules Series | | 2001–2005 |
| Australian rules football | South Australian National Football League | ABC | 1989–1992 |
| Baseball | Major League Baseball | ESPN (2014) | 1980s–1990s, 2014 |
| Basketball | Boomers vs. World | | 2023 |
| Basketball | FIBA Oceania Championship | | 2015 |
| Basketball | FIBA Oceania Women's Championship | | 2015 |
| Commonwealth Games | Brisbane 1982, Auckland 1990, Kuala Lumpur 1998, Melbourne 2006 | ABC (1982), Foxtel (2006) | 1982, 1990, 1998, 2006 |
| Cricket | The Ashes in Australia | ABC (1974–1978) | 1974–1978, 1982–2018 |
| Cricket | Australia in England | Fox Sports (2011–2023) | 1977, 1981, 1985, 1989, 1993, 1997, 2001, 2005, 2009, 2013, 2015, 2019, 2023 |
| Cricket | International Test Matches in Australia | | 1979–2018 |
| Cricket | ICC Cricket World Cup | Fox Sports (2011–2023) | 1975, 1979, 1983, 1987, 1992, 1996, 1999, 2003, 2007, 2011, 2015, 2019, 2023 |
| Cricket | JLT Cup | | 1980s–2006, 2013–2016 |
| Cricket | One-day International Cricket in Australia | | 1979–2018 |
| Cricket | Twenty20 International Cricket in Australia | | 2005–2018 |
| Cricket | World Series Cricket | | 1977–1979 |
| Cricket | World Twenty20 | Fox Sports | 2007, 2009, 2010, 2012, 2014, 2016, 2022 |
| Cycling | Tour Down Under | | 2012–2018 |
| Cycling | UCI Road World Championships | | 2022 |
| Golf | Australian Masters | Fox Sports | 2009–2011 |
| Golf | British Open | Fox Sports | 1980s–2011 |
| Golf | U.S. PGA Championship | ESPN | 1980s–2000s |
| Golf | Presidents Cup | Fox Sports | 2011, 2019 |
| Golf | US Masters | Fox Sports | 2018–2024 |
| Horse racing | Autumn Racing Carnival | Sky Racing | 2007–2012 |
| Ice Hockey | NHL Global Series | | 2023 |
| Invictus Games | Vancouver-Whistler | | 2025 |
| Motor racing | A1 Grand Prix | Fox Sports (2005–2009) | 2009 |
| Motor racing | Formula One | | 1980–2002 |
| Motor racing | MotoGP | | 1988–1996 |
| Motor racing | IndyCar World Series | Fox Sports, ESPN | 1996–2000s |
| Netball | Fast5 World Series | | 2016–2021 |
| Netball | Netball Quad Series | | 2017–2021 |
| Rugby league | Holden Cup | Fox Sports | 2008–2017 |
| Rugby league | ANZAC test | | 1997–2017 |
| Rugby league | Super League | | 2009–2011 |
| Rugby league | Challenge Cup | | 2009–2011 |
| Rugby league | Rugby League World Cup | Fox Sports | 1992–2008 |
| Rugby league | Pre Season Matches | Fox Sports | 2020 |
| Rugby league | Four Nations | Fox Sports | 1999–2016 |
| Rugby league | World Club Challenge | Fox Sports | 2008–2020 |
| Rugby league | Hostplus Cup | Fox Sports | 2012-2020 |
| Rugby league | The Knock On Effect NSW Cup | Fox Sports | 2018-2020 |
| Rugby union | Super Rugby AU | Stan Sport | 2021 |
| Rugby union | Super Rugby Trans-Tasman | Stan Sport | 2021 |
| Rugby union | Rugby World Cup | Stan Sport | 2011, 2015 |
| Rugby union | Women's Rugby World Cup | Stan Sport | 2021, 2025 |
| Soccer | 2002 FIFA World Cup | SBS | 2002 |
| Soccer | International Champions Cup | | 2015–2016 |
| Soccer | Liverpool F.C. Tour of Australia | | 2015 |
| Soccer | Socceroos Internationals | Fox Sports | 2016–2017 |
| Soccer | 2017 Superclásico de las Américas | | 2017 |
| Soccer | UEFA Youth League | | 2021–2023 |
| Swimming | FINA World Aquatics Championships | | 2001–2007, 2022 |
| Swimming | Pan Pacific Swimming Championships | | 1985–2006 |
| Tennis | ATP Cup | | 2020–2022 |
| Tennis | Fed Cup | beIN SPORTS | 2019–2020 |
| Tennis | Hopman Cup | | 2019 |
| Tennis | Masters Cup | | 2001 |
| Tennis | Sydney International | | 2019 |
| Tennis | Fast4 Tennis | Stan Sport | 2015–2019 |
| Yacht racing | 18ft Skiff | | 1990s |

^{1} The Nine Network televised the 2011 US Open final between Serena Williams and Samantha Stosur in its entirety.

== Programs ==
Nine's Wide World of Sports has presented the following recurring programs:

| Sport (event) | Program | Years |
|---|---|---|
| All | Wide World of Sports | 1981–1999, 2008–2016, 2024–present |
| Australian rules football | The AFL Sunday Footy Show | 1993–present |
| Australian rules football | Footy Classified (AFL) | 2007–present |
| Rugby league | The NRL Sunday Footy Show | 1993–present |
| Rugby league | 100% Footy (NRL) | 2018–present |
| Rugby league | NRL Wrap | 2022–present |
| Tennis | Cross Court | 2019–present |

Past

| Sport (event) | Program | Years |
|---|---|---|
| All | Sports Sunday | 2017–2023 |
| Australian rules football | The AFL Footy Show | 1994–2019 |
| Australian rules football | Any Given Sunday | 2005–2006 |
| Cricket | The Cricket Show | 1997–2018 |
| Cricket | Ashes to Ashes | 2006 |
| Rugby league | Boots N' All | 2001–2005 |
| Rugby league | The Sunday Roast | 2005–2014 |
| Rugby league | The NRL Footy Show | 1994–2018 |
| Rugby league | On the Couch with Sterlo | 2016–2020 |

== Local Sports Presenters ==
The following presenters work on Nine's flagship 6pm (5:30pm on the Gold Coast) news bulletins presenting the local sports segments during the second half of the bulletin.

| News Bulletin | Primary Presenter | Secondary Presenter |
|---|---|---|
| Nine News Sydney | James Bracey (Sun–Thu) | Emma Lawrence (Fri–Sat) |
| Nine News Melbourne | Tony Jones (Mon–Fri) | Nat Yoannidis (Sat–Sun) |
| Nine News Brisbane | Jonathan Uptin (Mon–Fri) | Dominique Loudon (Sat–Sun) |
| Nine News Adelaide | Tom Rehn (Mon–Fri) | Corey Norris (Sat–Sun) |
| Nine News Perth | Paddy Sweeney (Mon–Fri) | Alicia Molik (Sat–Sun) |
| Nine News Darwin | Adam Jackson (Mon–Fri) | Isabel Mullins (Sat–Sun) |
| Nine News Gold Coast | Bronte Gildea (Mon–Fri) | Matt Tsimpikas (Sat–Sun) |
| NBN News Northern NSW | Adam Murray (Sun–Wed) | Montanna Clare (Thu–Sat) |

== WWOS Radio ==
From 2020, Nine’s owned radio stations aired Wide World of Sports each weeknight from 6pm to 7pm. The hour‑long program covered major local, national and international sports stories and featured interviews with current and former athletes, coaches and journalists. It ended in April 2026 when Tapt Media replaced Nine Radio, with the stations continuing the format under the new title Sports Today.

| Radio Station | WWOS Presenter |
|---|---|
| 2GB Sydney | Adam Hawse (Mon–Fri) |
| 3AW Melbourne | Jimmy Bartel (Mon–Fri) |
| 4BC Brisbane | Peter Psaltis (Mon–Fri) |
| 6PR Perth | Mark Readings (Mon–Fri) |

== Presenters and commentators ==
Nine's Wide World of Sports has hosts and commentators for a variety of sporting events. The following is a list of past and present personalities featured:

=== Wide World of Sports ===
Formerly called Sports Sunday until 2024

- Nick McArdle (host, 2025–present)
- Roz Kelly (host, 2022–2025)
- James Bracey (host, 2018–2022)
- Liz Ellis
- Peter FitzSimons
- Mark Taylor
- other assorted guests

=== Past ===
- Michael Slater
- Emma Freedman
- John Steffenson
- Clint Stanaway
- Sally Fitzgibbons
- Ian Chappell
- Lisa Curry
- Ian Maurice
- Mike Gibson
- Tony Greig
- Max Walker
- Adam Gilchrist
- Giaan Rooney
- Yvonne Sampson
- Ken Sutcliffe
- Richie Calendar
- Kerryn Pratt
- Bill Lawry

=== Any Given Sunday ===
- James Brayshaw (2005)
- Nicole Livingstone (2006)
- Garry Lyon (2005)
- Mick Molloy (2006)
- Sam Newman (2005)

=== 2024 Paris Olympics ===
All times are listed in AEST

==== Hosts ====
- Karl Stefanovic (5:30am to 11am)
- Sarah Abo (5:30am to 11am)
- Todd Woodbridge (12pm to 3pm)
- Leila McKinnon (3pm to 7pm)
- Dylan Alcott (3pm to 7pm)
- James Bracey (7pm to 1am)
- Allison Langdon (7pm to 1am)
- Eddie McGuire (1am to 6am)
- Sylvia Jeffreys (9Gem 5pm to 10pm)
- Nick McArdle (9Gem 10pm to 3am)
- Sam McClure (9Gem 3am to 8am)

==== Commentators ====
- Mathew Thompson (lead caller, Swimming)
- Ian Thorpe (expert caller, Swimming)
- Giaan Rooney (expert caller, Swimming)
- Roz Kelly (interviews, Swimming)
- Gerard Whateley (lead caller, Athletics)
- David Culbert (lead caller, Athletics, Canoe)
- Tony Jones (interviews, Athletics)
- Todd Woodbridge (lead caller, Beach Volleyball; expert caller, Tennis)
- Kerri Pottharst (expert caller, Beach Volleyball)
- Scott McGrory (lead caller, BMX, Cycling)
- Andy Raymond (lead caller and expert, Boxing)
- Shane McInnies (lead caller, Canoe)
- Richard Fox (expert caller, Canoe)
- Phil Liggett (lead caller, Cycling)
- Cadel Evans (expert caller, Cycling)
- Mark Taylor (lead caller, Diving)
- Sam Fricker (expert caller, Diving)
- Brenton Speed (lead caller, Football, Basketball, Tennis)
- Grace Gill (expert caller, Football)
- Adam Papalia (lead caller, Basketball, Judo)
- Andrew Gaze (expert caller, Basketball)
- Jenna O'Hea (expert caller, Basketball)
- Will Davies (lead caller, Hockey)
- Georgie Parker (expert caller, Hockey)
- Matt Hill (lead caller, Rowing)
- James Tomkins (expert caller, Rowing)
- Sean Maloney (lead caller, Rugby sevens)
- Drew Mitchell (expert caller, Rugby sevens)
- Sera Naiqama (expert caller, Rugby sevens)
- Peter Psaltis (lead caller, Shooting)
- Russell Mark (expert caller, Shooting)
- Will McCloy (lead caller, Triathlon)
- Annabel Luxford (expert caller, Triathlon)
- Mitch Tomlinson (lead caller, Skateboarding)
- Nick Boserio (expert caller, Skateboarding)

==== Reporters ====
- Damian Ryan (Chief 9News Olympics Reporter)
- Christine Ahern
- Dylan Alcott
- Josh Bavas
- Brooke Boney
- Luke Bradnam (Surfing)
- Alex Cullen
- Edward Godfrey
- Tony Jones
- Roz Kelly
- Andrew Lofthouse
- Matthew Pavlich
- Alison Piotrowski
- Clint Stanaway

=== 2012 London Olympics ===
Various Nine programs including Today, Mornings, Millionaire Hot Seat, The Footy Show, 60 Minutes and Australia's Funniest Home Videos went on hiatus during Nine's broadcast of the 2012 London Olympics. A daily two-hour highlights package London Gold aired at 9am weekdays following the live overnight coverage.

- Eddie McGuire
- Ken Sutcliffe
- Giaan Rooney
- James Brayshaw
- Ray Warren
- Garry Lyon
- Karl Stefanovic
- Leila McKinnon
- James Tomkins
- Kerri Pottharst
- Scott McGrory
- Debbie Watson
- Melinda Gainsford-Taylor
- Michael Slater
- Andrew Gaze
- Andrew Voss
- Grant Hackett
- Jane Flemming
- Mark Nicholas
- Cameron Williams
- Phil Liggett
- Simon O'Donnell
- Billy Brownless
- Tony Jones
- Daley Thompson
- Steve Ovett

=== Rugby league ===
==== Current ====
- James Bracey (Host, 2017–present)
- Danika Mason (Host, 2021–present)
- Mathew Thompson (Chief Commentator, 2012–present)
- Peter Psaltis (Chief Commentator, 2019–present)
- Brenton Speed (Chief Commentator, 2023–present)
- Phil Gould (Commentator, 1994, 2000–present)
- Wally Lewis (Commentator, 2006–present)
- Andrew Johns (Commentator, 2007–present)
- Brad Fittler (Commentator, 2010–present)
- Darren Lockyer (Sideline Commentator, 2012–present)
- Allana Ferguson (Commentator, 2018–present)
- Ruan Sims (Commentator, 2018–present)
- Johnathan Thurston (Commentator, 2019–present)
- Billy Slater (Commentator, 2019–present)
- Sam Thaiday (Sideline Commentator, 2019–present)
- Paul Gallen (Sideline Commentator, 2020–present)
- Sonny Bill Williams (Commentator, 2021–present)
- Cameron Smith (Commentator, 2021–present)
- Millie Elliott (Commentator, 2023–present)

==== Former ====
- Ray Warren, (Chief Commentator, 1988–1989, 1991–2021)
- Darrell Eastlake (1983–1993)
- Ian Maurice (1983–1987, 1994)
- Jack Gibson (1983–1989)
- Mick Cronin (1988)
- Warren Ryan (1989)
- Michael Cleary (1989)
- Ellery Hanley (1989, 1992)
- Peter Sterling (1991–2021)
- Gavin Miller (1991)
- Paul Vautin (Commentator, 1992–2024)
- Gene Miles (1993–1994)
- Matthew Johns (2003–2009)
- Gary Belcher (1992–1997)
- Steve "Blocker" Roach (1992–1998)
- Andrew Voss (1994–2012) (host/commentator)
- Paul Harragon (2000–2008)
- Mark Coyne (2001–2002)
- Mark Geyer (2007–2008)
- Kevin Walters (2007) (Qld Matches Only)
- Steve Walters (2001–2002, 2009)
- Alan Thomas Occasional Chief Commentator (2007)
- Ben Ikin (2006–2009) Qld Cup (2012)
- Wendell Sailor (2007, 2009–2010)
- Jason Taylor (2002, 2010)
- Laurie Daley (2008)
- Mark Gasiner (2007) (Guest Commentator)
- Adam MacDougall (2007) (Guest Commentator)
- Tim Gilbert (chief commentator, 2006–2015)
- Gorden Tallis (sideline commentator, 2013–2015)
- Yvonne Sampson (host, 2013–2016)
- Brett Finch (sideline commentator, 2014–2016)
- Erin Molan (host, 2016–2021)
- Ray Hadley (Chief Commentator) (2012–2018)

==== NSW Cup ====
- Peter Psaltis (commentator, 2019–present)
- Jamie Soward (commentator, 2018–present)
- Danika Mason (host, 2019–present)

==== QLD Cup ====
- Mark Braybrook (commentator, 2019–present)
- Scott Sattler (commentator, 2013–present)
- Peter Badel (sideline commentator, 2016)
- Adam Jackson (sideline commentator 2016–present)

==== The Sunday NRL Footy Show ====
- Emma Lawrence (host)
- Andrew Johns (panelist)
- Brad Fittler (panelist)
- Billy Slater (panelist)

==== 100% Footy ====
- James Bracey (Host)
- Emma Lawrence (Fill-in Host)
- Phil Gould (Panelist)
- Paul Gallen (Panelist)
- Cameron Smith (Panelist)
- Allana Ferguson (Panelist)

==== The NRL Footy Show ====
===== Former =====
- Peter Sterling (1992–2007, 2010, co-host)
- Steve Roach (1992–1999, co-host)
- Ray Hadley (1995–1997, co-host)
- Paul Harragon (2001–2003, co-host)
- Matthew Johns (2003–2009, co-host)
- Laurie Daley (2008, co-host)
- Andrew Voss (2009)
- Benji Marshall (2010–2013, 2015)
- Brad Fittler (2010–2011, co-host)
- Michael Slater (2012–2014, co-host)
- Gorden Tallis (2013–2015)
- Erin Molan (host, 2018)
- Andrew Johns (co-host, 2018)
- Brad Fittler (co-host, 2018)
- Ryan Girdler (co-host, 2018)
- Darryl Brohman (small talk segment, 2010–2018)
- Beau Ryan (regular appearances, 2010–2018)
- Joel Caine (Sportsbet updates, 2014–2018)

=== Tennis ===
==== Australian Open ====
- Tony Jones (Host, 2018–present)
- James Bracey (Host, 2018–present)
- Roz Kelly (Host, 2022–present)
- Rebecca Maddern (Host, 2018–2021)
- Nick McArdle (Host, 9Gem, 2022–present)
- Brett Phillips (Host, 9Gem, 2025–present)
- Sylvia Jeffreys (Host, 9Gem, 2025–present)
- Erin Molan (Host, 9Gem, 2018–2020)
- Seb Costello (Host, 9Gem, 2018–2023)
- Alicia Loxley (Host, 9Gem, 2020–2021)
- Sam McClure (Host, 9Gem, 2021–2022)
- Emma Lawrence (Host, 9Gem, 2023–2024)
- Matthew Pavlich (Host, 9Gem, 2024)
- Jim Courier (Commentator, 2018–present)
- Todd Woodbridge (Commentator, 2018–present)
- Dylan Alcott (Commentator, 2018–present)
- Jelena Dokic (Commentator, 2018–present)
- Alicia Molik (Commentator, 2018–present)
- Sam Smith (Commentator, 2018–present)
- Lleyton Hewitt (Commentator, 2018–present)
- John McEnroe (Commentator, 2018–2020, 2024–present)
- Casey Dellacqua (Commentator, 2019–present)
- Peter Psaltis (Commentator, 2023–present)
- Samantha Stosur (Commentator, 2024–present)
- John Millman (Commentator, 2024–present)
- Brenton Speed (Commentator, 2024–present)
- Sam Groth (Commentator, 2018–2022)
- Tom Rehn (Commentator, 2019–2022)
- Darren Cahill (Commentator, 2022–2023)
- Danika Mason (reporter)
- Clint Stanaway (reporter)

==== French Open ====
- Todd Woodbridge (Host and Commentator, 2021–present)
- Brett Phillips (Late Night Host, 2021–present)
- Roz Kelly (Host, 2023–present)
- Jelena Dokic (Commentator, 2021–present)
- Brenton Speed (Commentator, 2023–present)
- Samantha Stosur (Commentator, 2023–present)
- Sam Groth (Commentator, 2021–2022)

==== Wimbledon ====
- Roz Kelly (Host, 2022, 2024–present)
- Brett Phillips (Late Night Host, 2021–present)
- Jelena Dokic (Commentator, 2021–present)
- Tony Jones (Correspondent, 2022–present)
- Todd Woodbridge (Host and Commentator, 2021; Analyst 2022–present)
- Alicia Molik (Analyst 2023–present)
- Sam Groth (Commentator, 2021–2022)
- Nick McArdle (Host, 2023)
- Samantha Stosur (Commentator, 2023)

==== US Open ====
- Brett Phillips (Early Morning Host, 2022–present, Commentator 2024–present)
- Jelena Dokic (Commentator, 2022–present)
- Georgie Parker (Host, 2024–present)
- Todd Woodbridge (Host and Commentator, 2022–2023)

=== Cricket ===
Current

- Mark Taylor (analyst)
- Callum Ferguson (analyst)
- Steve O'Keefe (analyst)

==== Cricket World Cup 2019, Women's Ashes 2019, Ashes 2019 ====
- Rebecca Maddern (host – Cricket World Cup)
- James Bracey (host – Cricket World Cup)
- Clint Stanaway (host – Cricket World Cup)
- Alicia Muling (host – Women's Ashes)
- Todd Woodbridge (host – The Ashes)
- Mark Taylor (host/analyst – Cricket World Cup, Women's Ashes, The Ashes)
- Lisa Sthalekar (host/analyst – Cricket World Cup, Women's Ashes, The Ashes)
- Ian Healy (analyst – Cricket World Cup, Women's Ashes, The Ashes)
- Mel Jones (analyst – The Ashes)
- Rob Canning (reporter – Cricket World Cup)

==== 2018 (most recent) Home Summer of Cricket ====
- Mark Nicholas, (host/commentator, 2000–2018)
- Michael Slater (host/commentator, 2005–2018)
- Ian Chappell (commentator, 1980–2018)
- Ian Healy (commentator, 1999–2018)
- Bill Lawry (commentator, 1972–2018)
- Mark Taylor (commentator, 1999–2018)
- Shane Warne (commentator, 1998, 2000/01, 2003/04, 2008–2011, 2013–2018)
- Michael Clarke (commentator, 2014–2018)
- Tom Moody (commentator, 2002–2018)
- Lisa Sthalekar (commentator – women's matches)
- Mel Jones (commentator – women's matches)

==== Past ====
- Richie Benaud (host/commentator, 1977–2013)
- Stephanie Brantz, (boundary commentator, 2006–2007)
- Greg Chappell (commentator, 1989–1997)
- Mike Hussey (commentator, 2013–2016)
- Tony Cozier (commentator, 1977–1992)
- Kate Fitzpatrick (commentator, 1983)
- Adam Gilchrist (commentator, 2008–2011)
- Peter Sterling (commentator, 1993/94)
- Tony Greig (commentator, 1979–2012)
- David Hookes (commentator, 1986–1987)
- Brendon Julian (commentator, 2003)
- Geoff Lawson (commentator, 1989, 1993)
- Rod Marsh (commentator, 1985–1990, 1996–1998)
- Simon O'Donnell, (commentator/Cricket Show host, 1988, 1993–2011)
- Bruce Yardley, (commentator, 1992–98)
- Kerry O'Keeffe, (commentator, 1990–98)
- Dean Jones, (commentator, 1994/95)
- Greg Ritchie (commentator, 1992–1997)
- Brett Lee (commentator/Cricket Show co-host, 2011–2016)
- Keith Stackpole (commentator, 1977–1986)
- Jeff Thomson (commentator, 1989)
- Frank Tyson (commentator, 1979–1986)
- Max Walker (commentator, 1985–1991)
- Doug Walters (commentator, 1986–1989)
- Mark Waugh (commentator, 2002)
- Mike Whitney (commentator, 1993–1994)
- Glenn McGrath (commentator, 2012–2013)
- James Brayshaw (host/commentator, 2009–2016)
- Yvonne Sampson (boundary commentator/women's matches host, 2014–2016)

==== Guest international commentators ====
- Michael Atherton (2002–2003) Ashes tour to Australia
- Fred Trueman (1982/83) Ashes tour to Australia
- Bob Willis (1986–1987) Ashes tour to Australia
- Geoff Boycott (1990/91) and (1994/95) Ashes tours to Australia
- Ian Botham 1998/99 Ashes tour to Australia
- Colin Croft (1995/96) and (1996–1997)
- Sunil Gavaskar
- David Gower
- Sir Richard Hadlee (1990/91) and (1993–1994)
- Michael Holding (1992–93, 2004–2005)
- Waqar Younis (2004/05 & 2016/17)
- David Lloyd (2006–2007, 2013–2014, 2014–2015 and 2015 Ashes in the UK)
- Ian Smith (1997–1998, 2001–2002, 2004–2005, 2007–2008, 2011/12 and 2015/16)
- Michael Vaughan (2010/11, 2013/14, 2015, 2017/18 Ashes tours)
- Kevin Pietersen (2016–2018)
- VVS Laxman (2016)
- Russell Arnold (2017)

=== Netball ===
- Clint Stanaway (host, 2017–2021)
- Roz Kelly (host, 2019–2021)
- Jayne Azzopardi (host, 2018–2021)
- Aislin Kriukelis (host, 2018–2021)
- Warren Tredrea (host, 2018–2021)
- Sue Gaudion (host/commentator, 2016–2021)
- Anne Sargeant (commentator, 2016–2021)
- Liz Ellis (commentator, 2016–2021)
- Sharelle McMahon (commentator, 2016–2021)
- Catherine Cox (commentator, 2017–2021)
- Clare McMeniman (commentator, 2018–2021)
- Julie Snook (courtside reporter, 2017–2021)
- Jack Berketa (courtside reporter, 2017–2021)
- Paddy Sweeney (courtside reporter, 2017–2021)
- Alexis Daish (courtside reporter, 2018–2021)
- Carrie-Anne Greenbank (courtside reporter, 2018–2021)
- Michael Atkinson (courtside reporter, 2018–2021)
- Kim Green (commentator, 2019–2021)
- Seb Costello (host/commentator, 2017-2021)
- Erin Molan (host, 2017 Fast5 Netball World Series)
- Laura Geitz (expert analysis, 2016 Fast5 Netball World Series)
- Sharni Layton (expert analysis, 2016 Fast5 Netball World Series)
- Sylvia Jeffreys (host, 2016–2017)
- Tom Mitchell (courtside reporter, 2017)
- Christine Ahern (courtside reporter, 2017)

=== Association Football ===
- Clint Stanaway (host, 2015–2017)
- Michael Bridges (expert analysis, 2015–2017)
- David Zdrilic (expert analysis, 2015–2017)
- Harry Kewell (expert analysis, 2017)
- Craig Moore (expert analysis, 2017)
- Brenton Speed (commentator (via Fox Football, 2015–2017)

=== Tour Down Under Cycling ===
- Tim Gilbert (host, 2012–2018)
- John Steffensen (co-host, 2016–2018)
- Phil Liggett (commentator, 2012–2018)
- Paul Sherwen (commentator, 2012–2018)
- Robbie McEwen (commentator, 2012–2018)

=== Rugby union ===
- Ken Sutcliffe (host)
- Cameron Williams (host)
- Bill Baxter (host)
- Brendan Cannon (expert analysis)
- Benn Robinson (expert analysis)
- Phil Waugh (live ground reports & expert analysis)
- Nathan Sharpe (live ground reports & expert analysis)
- Andrew Swain (Secondary Caller), 2021–present
- Sean Maloney (Main Caller), 2021–present
- Nick McArdle (Host), 2021–present
- Roz Kelly (Host), 2021–present
- Tim Horan (Expert Analysis), 2021–present
- Drew Mitchell (Expert Analysis), 2021–present
- Andrew Mehrtens (Expert Analysis), 2021–present
- Allana Ferguson (Expert Analysis), 2021–present
- Morgan Turinui (Expert Analysis), 2021–present
- Justin Harrison (Expert Analysis), 2021–present
- David Campese (Expert Analysis), 2021–present
- Michael Cheika (Expert Analysis), 2021–present
- Sonny Bill Williams (Expert Analysis), 2021–present
- Sera Naiqama (Expert Analysis), 2021–present
- Paddy Sweeney (Sideline), 2021–present
- Michael Atkinson (Sideline), 2021–present

=== National Basketball League ===
- Bill Baxter (host, 2015–2016)
- Brad Rosen (expert analysis, 2015–2016)

=== Australian Rules Football ===
==== AFL ====
- Eddie McGuire (2002–2005) (Friday Night Football – all games and Sunday Football commentator – Victoria Games – 2002–2004)
- Garry Lyon (2002–2006) (Friday Night Football – all games and Sunday Football expert commentator – Victoria Games)
- Dermott Brereton (2002–2006) Friday Night Football – all games and Sunday Football expert commentator – Interstate Games)
- Dennis Cometti (2002–2006) (Friday Night Football – all games and Sunday Football commentator – Interstate Games)
- James Brayshaw (2002–2006) (Sunday Football commentator – Victoria Games – 2002, 2005–2006 and Interstate Games – 2003–2004, 2006)
- Gerard Healy (2002–2003) (Sunday Football expert commentator)
- Chris Jones, boundary rider (2005–2006) (Sunday Football boundary rider – Victoria Games)
- Tony Jones (2002–2006) (Friday Night Football boundary rider, Sunday Football studio host)
- Dr. Peter Larkins (2002–2006) (Friday Night Football boundary rider)
- Jason McCartney, boundary rider (2004–2006) (Sunday Football boundary rider – Interstate Games)
- Anthony Mithen, boundary rider (2002–2003) (Sunday Football boundary rider – Interstate Games)
- Michael Roberts (2002–2006) (Sunday Football boundary rider – Victoria Games – 2002–2003 and Interstate Games 2004–2006)
- Dwayne Russell (2002–2006) (Friday Night Football – 2006 and Sunday Football commentator – Interstate Games)
- Brian Taylor (2002–2006) (Sunday Football commentator – Victoria Games)

==== SANFL ====
- Ken Cunningham (Host)
- Kym Dillon (Commentator)
- Ian Day (Commentator)
- Graham Campbbell (Commentator)
- Brian Cunningham (Field Commentator)

==== EJ Whitten Legends Game ====
- Garry Lyon (Host/Commentator)
- James Brayshaw (Commentator)
- Brian Taylor (Commentator)
- Billy Brownless (Commentator)
- Tony Jones (Field Commentator)
- Shane Crawford (Field Commentator)
- Peter Helliar (Commentator)
- Craig Hutchison (Commentator)
- Nathan Brown (Field Commentator)
- Clint Stanaway (Field Commentator)

==== The Footy Show panellists ====
- Eddie McGuire (1994–2005, 2017–2018) (host)
- Sam Newman (1994–2018) (regular)
- Trevor Marmalade (1994–2008) (regular)
- Garry Lyon (2006–2015) (host)
- James Brayshaw (2006–2016) (host)
- Rebecca Maddern (2016–2018) (host)
- Craig Hutchison (2007–2011, reporter) (2017, host)
- Neroli Meadows (2019) (host)
- Anthony Lehmann (2019) (host)
- Damian Barrett (2010–2018) (reporter)
- Billy Brownless (2009–2018) (panellist)
- Shane Crawford (2009–2019) (panellist)
- Matthew Lloyd (2012–2013) (panellist)
- Brendon Fevola (2017–2018) (panellist)
- Dane Swan (2017–2018) (panellist)
- Chris Judd (2018) (panellist)
- Dave Hughes (2015–2017) (panellist)

==== Current panelists ====
- Tony Jones (2006–2008, 2017–present) (host)
- Damian Barrett (2010–present) (reporter)
- Nathan Brown (2010–present)
- Matthew Lloyd (2012–present)
- Rory Sloane (2025–present)

==== Former panelists ====
- Max Walker (1993–1998) (original host)
- Mal Brown (1993–1998)
- Doug Hawkins (1994–1997)
- Sam Kekovich (1993–1998)
- Simon O'Donnell (1993–1996, 2012)
- Lou Richards (1993–2008)
- Ted Whitten (1993–1995)
- Dr Peter Larkins (1996–2010)
- Brian Taylor (1995–2010)
- James Brayshaw (2009–2011)
- Danny Frawley (2005–2008)
- Dermott Brereton (1993–2011)
- Simon Madden (1993–1998)
- David Rhys-Jones (1993–1998)
- Nathan Thompson (2009–2011)
- Garry Lyon (1999–2005)
- Sam Newman (1993–1998)
- Billy Brownless (1998–2021)
- Craig Hutchinson (2013–2016)
- Mark Bickley (2003–2007)
- Luke Ball (2014–2016)
- Kane Cornes (2017–2024)

=== Swimming ===
- Tony Jones (2022 FINA World Swimming Championships (25 m) Host)
- Mathew Thompson (2022 FINA World Swimming Championships (25 m) lead Commentator)
- Ian Thorpe (2022 FINA World Swimming Championships (25 m) Expert Commentator)
- Giaan Rooney (2022 FINA World Swimming Championships (25 m) Expert Commentator)
- Ariarne Titmus (2022 FINA World Swimming Championships (25 m) Expert Commentator)
- Seb Costello (2022 FINA World Swimming Championships (25 m) Host/Reporter)
- James Bracey (2022 FINA Aquatics Championship Host)

=== Melbourne Cup carnival ===
- Eddie McGuire (2024, studio commentary)
- James Bracey (2024, mounting yards)
- Francesca Cumani (2024, analysis)
- Billy Slater (2024, jockey interviews)

== Awards ==
Sports coverage and programs made by Nine's Wide World of Sports have been won and been nominated for several awards at the Logie Awards.

== See also ==
- ABC Sport
- Seven Sport
- 10 Sport
- SBS Sport
- Fox Sports (Australia)
- Stan Sport
- List of Australian television series
- List of longest running Australian television series
