= List of Nine Network presenters =

This is a list of Nine Network's past and present presenters and the programs they appear on, in alphabetical order by their last name.

== Current Presenters ==
Presenter	Programs	Time at Network
Amelia Adams	Nine News & 60 Minutes	2008–
Alison Ariotti	Nine News & Today reporter (2009–2013)	2004–
Jayne Azzopardi	Today, Weekend Today & Nine News	2009–
Scherri-Lee Biggs	Nine News	2014–
James Bracey	Wide World of Sports, State of Origin, Australian Open, Sports Sunday & 100% Footy	2017–
Tara Brown	60 Minutes, Nine News, A Current Affair & The Gift	1992–
Mark Burrows	Nine News	1986–
Scott Cam	Burke's Backyard, Backyard Blitz, Domestic Blitz & The Block	2000–
David Campbell	Today Extra & Weekend Today	2012–
Natalia Cooper	Today (2013–2019), Weekend Today & Nine News	2010–
Shelley Craft	Domestic Blitz, Australia's Funniest Home Videos & The Block	2008–
Melissa Downes	Nine News	2001–
Ben Fordham	Today, Nine News, A Current Affair & Australian Ninja Warrior	1999–
Tracy Grimshaw	Today (1996–2005), A Current Affair & Do You Want To Live Forever?	1981–
Natalie Gruzlewski	Getaway, The Farmer Wants a Wife & Nine News (2010–2012)	1999–
Peter Hitchener	Nine News	1974–
Sylvia Jeffreys	Nine News, A Current Affair & Today	2005–
Tony Jones	Nine News & Today (2019)	1986–
Deborah Knight	Weekend Today & Today (2011–2014), A Current Affair	2011–
Monika Kos	Nine News	2020–
Allison Langdon	60 Minutes, Weekend Today, Today & A Current Affair	2001–
Alicia Loxley	Weekend Today (2010–2011) & Nine News	2009–
Eddie McGuire	Millionaire Hot Seat, 1 vs 100, Nine's Wide World of Sports commentator	1993–
Leila McKinnon	Weekend Today (2009–2014), Nine News & A Current Affair	1995–
Brett McLeod	Nine News	2002–
Eva Milic	Nine Gold Coast News	2018–
Livinia Nixon	Getaway, Postcards, Temptation, Nine News & Hey Hey It's Saturday	1997–
Peter Overton	60 Minutes (2001–2009) & Nine News	1991–
Catriona Rowntree	Getaway & The Chopping Block	1993–
Belinda Russell	Nine News & Today Extra	2007–
Davina Smith	A Current Affair	2002–
Michael Thomson	Nine News	1987–2011, 2013–
Tracy Vo	Nine News	2007–
Richard Wilkins	Today, Today Extra & Weekend Today	1985–

== Former Presenters ==
Presenter	Programs	Time at Network
Sarah Abo	60 Minutes & Today	2019–2026
Brooke Boney	Today	2019–2024
Liam Bartlett	60 Minutes	2006–2022
Stephanie Brantz	Nine News & Nine's Wide World of Sports commentator	2006–2010 (departed for ABC TV)
James Brayshaw	The Footy Show & Nine's Wide World of Sports commentator	2002–2016
Paul Clitheroe	Money	1993–2002, 2006
Keith Conlon	Postcards	1995–2011
Kevin Crease	Clarkson's TV Hostess Quest, Adelaide Tonight, News Beat & Nine News	1959–1974, 1987–2007 (deceased)
Alex Cullen	Today	2020–2025
Kate Collins	Nine News	2006–2025
Larry Emdur	The Price Is Right & Cash Bonanza	1993–2005 (departed for Seven Network)
Mark Ferguson	Nine News	1992–2009
Heather Foord	Nine News	1989–2011
Georgie Gardner	Today (2006–2014) & Nine News	2002–2026
Tim Gilbert	Nine News & Today (2014–2019)	1996–2019
Ross Greenwood	Nine News, Today, A Current Affair & 60 Minutes	2003–2019
Jo Hall	Nine News	1979–2021
Brooke Hanson	What's Good For You	2006–2007
Peter Harvey	Nine News & 60 Minutes	1975–2013 (deceased)
Brian Henderson	Nine News	1956–2002 (deceased)
Steven Jacobs	Today & Power of 10 (2008)	1991–1995, 2005–2019
Helen Kapalos	Nightline, A Current Affair & Nine News	2002–2005 (departed for Network 10, then Seven Network)
Rob Kelvin	Nine News	1979–2010
Wendy Kingston	Nine News & Weekend Today (2014–2015)	2007–2021
Sonia Kruger	Today Extra (2016–2019), The Voice & Big Brother	2011–2019 (departed for Seven Network)
Wally Lewis	Nine News	1999–2023
Steve Liebmann	Today	1981–1987, 1990–2005
Andrew Lotfthouse	Nine News	2008–2025
Garry Lyon	The Footy Show & Nine's Wide World of Sports commentator	2002–2017
Rebecca Maddern	Weekend Today, Australian Ninja Warrior & AFL Footy Show	2016–2021
Trevor Marmalade	The Footy Show	1994–2009
Ray Martin	60 Minutes (1979–1984), A Current Affair (1994–1998, 2003–2005) & Midday (1985–1993)	1978–2008
Erin Molan	Nine News Sydney & The Sunday Footy Show	2008–2022
Mike Munro	Nine News, A Current Affair, This Is Your Life & Missing Persons Unit	1986–2008 (departed for Seven Network)
Brian Naylor	Nine News	1978–1998 (deceased)
Kelly Nestor	Nine News	2007–2009
Bert Newton	Bert's Family Feud, 20 to 01 & What a Year	1959–1985, 2006–2012 (deceased)
Bruce Paige	Nine News (1993–2009) & Nine Gold Coast News	1993–2009
Michael Pavlich	Nine News	2018–2025
Toni Pearen	Australia's Funniest Home Videos	2003–2007
Ed Phillips	Temptation	2005–2008
Andrew Rochford	What's Good For You	2006–2009 (departed for Network 10)
Michael Slater	Nine's Wide World of Sports commentator	2006–2018
Karl Stefanovic	Today, Nine News & 60 Minutes	2000–2026
Kellie Sloane	Nine News, Nightline & Today	1997–2010
Amber Sherlock	Today (2007–2009), Nine News Now & Nine News	2007–2025
Daryl Somers	Hey Hey It's Saturday	1969–1999, 2009–2010
Vince Sorrenti	Helloworld (Now a Channel Seven production)	2018–2019
Michael Usher	Nightline, Nine News & 60 Minutes	1993–2016 (left for Seven Network)
Jonathan Uptin	Nine News	2000–2025
Lisa Wilkinson	Today	2007–2017
Cameron Williams	Today (2006–2010), Weekend Today (2009–2016) & Nine News	2006–2022

== See also ==
- Nine News for lists of reporters for each state's bulletins.
