= Friday Night Football (NRL) =

- Genre: Sports broadcast
- Starring: See List of Commentators
- Opening theme: "No one stands alone" by Extreme Music
- Country of origin: Australia
- Original language: English
- No. of seasons: 24

Production
- Running time: 180 minutes

Original release
- Network: Network Ten (1988–1991); Nine Network (1992–present); 9Gem (2012–present); Fox Sports (2016); Fox League (2017–present)
- Release: 17 June 1988 – present

Friday Night Football is an Australian sports broadcast of National Rugby League games on Friday evenings.

In 1982, several early season NSWRL games were played on a Friday night, however regular non-weekend football began as Monday Night Football in 1985, with Canterbury meeting Manly on 24 June. However moderate attendances and a night game prior to a working day eventually saw the game shifted to Friday from 1988 on. As with Monday Night Football, regular Friday fixtures only commenced in the latter half of the season, due to the midweek competition. By 1990, a Friday night game was usually scheduled in all rounds.

The Friday night game is considered to be the most watched game of the week and many NRL clubs have openly stated that they appreciate the publicity given by these matches. The Nine Network choose the game they consider to be the "match of the round" 5 or 6 weeks in advance. This system has both positive and negative consequences, as it increases the likelihood of a good game played between two in-form sides, but does not allow fans or clubs a large amount of time to know on which day they will play in any given round.

== Broadcast history ==
The Nine Network has broadcast Friday Night NRL games since 1992. From 2007 the Nine Network now broadcasts two NRL games in New South Wales, Queensland and the Australian Capital Territory on Friday Night - one live at 7.30, and the second match replayed at 9.30. Whichever of the two matches is televised first can depend on which teams are playing, for example, a match involving a Queensland-based team would in most cases be televised first into Queensland, and delayed in New South Wales; conversely, a match involving a New South Wales based team is usually televised first into New South Wales, and delayed in Queensland.

In the past, a Nine News or Nightline update separated the two broadcast matches, however in 2008 this was discontinued. In 2010, it was reinstated, before it was again scrapped.

From Round 5 of the 2012 NRL season, GEM, a sister station of the Nine Network, started showing Friday night NRL matches live into Victoria, South Australia and Western Australia, pitting it against the Seven Network's live AFL coverage in those states. This allows Victorian NRL fans to see live games involving the Melbourne Storm if they are scheduled on a Friday night.

From Round 4 of the 2014 NRL season, for yet unexplained reasons GEM stopped showing the NRL on Friday nights and Sunday afternoons live into Adelaide, with the coverage for all games on Nine reverting to the after midnight 'graveyard shift'. As the change was unannounced and in Adelaide only (the rest of South Australia still receives the live coverage), this has angered many fans in the city, both South Australians and those who have re-located from NSW or Qld.

In 2016 the two-game model was scrapped with one match moved to Thursday Nights as Thursday Night Football. In this season Fox Sports networks also began a simulcast of the game.

From 2017 a second game returned, replacing Monday Night Football. This game is exclusive to Fox League and is played at 6:00 p.m.

== Theme songs ==
The theme song for NRL coverage has been altered throughout the years. In 2000, Friday Night Football used the song, Friday on My Mind (sung by Vanessa Amorosi and Lee Kernaghan) to open the coverage. Since 2002, it has been opened by the Wide World of Sport's banner. The popular "That's My Team" theme used by the NRL was the backdrop for the openers from 2003 to 2006. In 2007, End Of Fashion's song The Game was used, whilst in 2009 and 2010 Children Collide's song Social Currency was used. In 2011, the NRL's main theme song, Bon Jovi's This is Our House, was used.

== Hosts & commentators ==
Host

- James Bracey

Chief commentators

- Mathew Thompson
- Peter Psaltis
- Brenton Speed

Co-commentators

- Phil Gould
- Wally Lewis
- Paul Vautin
- Andrew Johns
- Billy Slater
- Cameron Smith

Sideline commentators

- Brad Fittler
- Darren Lockyer
- Danika Mason

Former hosts and commentators

- Yvonne Sampson
- Cameron Williams
- Brett Finch
- Ray Warren
- Peter Sterling

== Hosts & commentators (Fox League) ==
Fox League televises both the 6:00 p.m. and the 8:05 p.m. games.

Host

- Yvonne Sampson

Chief commentators

- Andrew Voss
- Dan Ginnane
- Warren Smith
- Matthew Russell

Co-commentators

- Greg Alexander
- Braith Anasta
- Cooper Cronk
- Michael Ennis
- James Graham
- Steve Roach
- Corey Parker

Sideline commentators

- Lara Pitt
- Matthew Russell
- Brent Tate

Former

- Brenton Speed (chief)
- Andy Raymond (chief/sideline)
- Danny Buderus
- Gary Belcher
- Brett Finch
- Mark Gasnier
- Kevin Walters
- Megan Barnard (sideline)
- Brett Kimmorley (sideline)

== See also ==
- Friday Night Football (AFL)
