= Stan (streaming service) =

Australian video streaming service

Stan Entertainment Pty Ltd
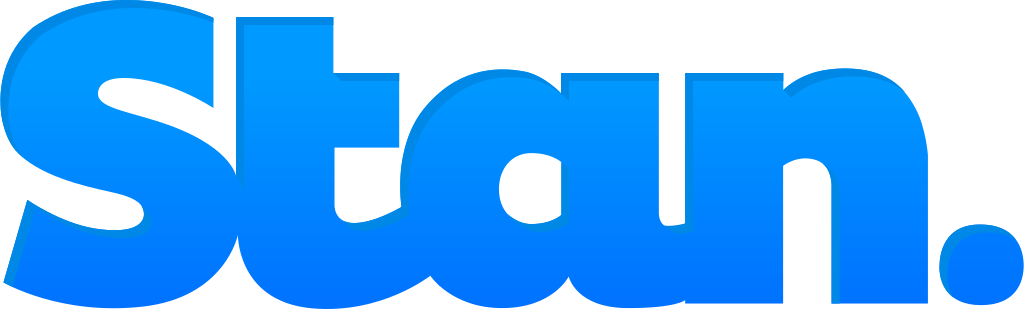
- Website type: OTT platform
- Available in: English
- Founded: 1 April 2014; 12 years ago
- Predecessor: StreamCo Media (2014)
- Headquarters: Sydney, Australia
- Area served: Australia
- Owner: Nine Entertainment
- Products: Video on demand
- Revenue: A$149.1 million (H1 FY2021)
- Parent: Nine Digital
- Website: stan.com.au
- Registration: Monthly subscription required to access content
- Users: ▲2.6 million (as of 22 February 2023)
- Launched: 26 January 2015; 11 years ago
- Current status: Active

Stan (stylised as Stan.) is an Australian subscription video on-demand over-the-top streaming television service. It was launched on 26 January 2015. Stan originally was founded as StreamCo Media, a 50/50 joint venture between Nine Entertainment and Fairfax Media. In August 2014, each company invested A$50 million in StreamCo. StreamCo was renamed Stan Entertainment in December 2014, prior to the January 2015 launch of the streaming service. Nine Entertainment acquired Fairfax Media in 2018, making Stan a wholly owned subsidiary of Nine Digital.

The service offers a broad range of film and television content from both local and foreign productions, particularly from the United States and United Kingdom. Stan also includes a growing library of their own original film and television content. With over 2.6 million subscribers, as of June 2023 Stan is the fourth largest streaming service in Australia, behind Disney+, Amazon Prime Video and Netflix.

Stan's original comedy No Activity became the first SVOD program ever nominated for a Logie Award at the 2016 ceremony.

== Content ==
At launch, the first major programming announcement was the exclusive rights to the premiere season of Better Call Saul as well as the rights to Breaking Bad, which previously aired on Foxtel. It also held the rights to Transparent and Mozart in the Jungle.

The company has a content partnership deal with Sony Pictures, ABC, SBS and its World Movies subsidiary, Paramount Global, Amazon MGM Studios, BBC Worldwide, Showtime, CBS, Village Roadshow, and Warner Bros. International Television Distribution. In December 2014, Stan signed non-exclusive agreements with ABC Commercial and Viacom, with the latter covering Comedy Central, MTV, and Nickelodeon programming.

In August 2015, Stan signed a multi-year deal with Warner Bros. International Television Distribution, bringing several new U.S. series to the platform, including Australian premiere series A to Z and Selfie, as well as the third season of The Following (the first two seasons aired on the Nine Network). In 2016, Stan reached an exclusive multi-year deal with CBS Corporation, which included exclusive rights to Showtime original programs (before the launch of Paramount+ in August 2021).

On 13 December 2018, Stan reached a content agreement with Disney to carry films and television series. The agreement ended in late-2019 due to the launch of Disney+. On 20 August 2019, Stan reached an agreement with Paramount Pictures, carrying some of its films, and series such as The Great and Looking for Alaska. In August 2020, Stan reached a multi-year agreement with NBCUniversal for rights to content from Sky Studios and its U.S. streaming service Peacock. Eventually, the Foxtel Group made a deal with NBC Universal in 2022 to be the home of newer Peacock shows, following the expiration of NBC Universal's deal with Stan.

=== Stan Original ===
Stan commissioned its parent company, the Nine Network, to produce original Australian drama series exclusive to the service and approached ABC and SBS on the possibility of co-producing shows and films.

On 16 February 2015, Stan announced it was developing two original series: a Wolf Creek series, and a political drama based on the life of High Court judge Lionel Murphy titled Enemies of the State, with additional productions to be announced in the coming months.

On 1 May 2015, Stan announced its first commissioned series, a comedy titled No Activity; which premiered on 22 October 2015. Stan renewed No Activity on 15 December 2015 for a second season.

Series developed and aired by Stan are known as Stan Original series.

=== Acquired exclusives ===
The following is a list of acquired programs which have had their Australian premiere on Stan.

- 11.22.63
- A to Z
- Acquitted
- Agent Binky: Pets of the Universe
- Angie Tribeca (seasons 1–2)
- Animaniacs (2020 series)
- Ash vs. Evil Dead
- Better Call Saul (seasons 1–5)
- Billions
- Billy and Billie
- Billy the Kid
- Birdgirl
- Blunt Talk (seasons 1–2)
- The Bold Type
- The Bridge
- Community (season 6)
- Constantine
- Deutschland 83
- Dig
- Domina
- Electric Dreams
- Episodes (season five; 2017)
- Everything's Gonna Be Okay
- Eye Candy
- Flesh and Bone
- The Following (season 3)
- Gallipoli (episodes 2–7)
- The Great (season 1–3)
- Heathers (uncensored version)
- iZombie (seasons 1–2)
- Lost Girl (seasons 4–5 part two)
- Madagascar: A Little Wild
- Masters of Sex (season 4)
- Mozart in the Jungle (seasons 1–2)
- Normal People
- Power (seasons 1–2)
- Preacher
- Rise
- Robot Chicken (seasons 6–11)
- RuPaul's Drag Race
- Saved by the Bell (2020 series)
- Selfie
- Sherlock: "The Abominable Bride"
- Squidbillies (seasons 10–13)
- Survivor US (season 50 onwards, previously seasons on Nine Network, including 9Go! & 9Now)
- Ten Pound Poms
- Transparent (seasons 1–2)
- Twin Peaks (limited series; 22 May 2017)
- Underground (24 January 2017)
- UnREAL
- Will & Grace (seasons 9–11)
- Yellowstone
- YOLO: Crystal Fantasy

== Stan Sport ==
Stan Sport
- Website type: OTT video streaming
- Available in: English
- Founded: November 2020; 6 years ago
- Headquarters: Sydney, Australia
- Area served: Australia
- Owner: Nine Digital
- Products: Streaming media; Video on demand
- Services: Sports television distribution
- Parent: Nine Entertainment
- Website: www.stan.com.au
- Registration: Monthly subscription required to access content
- Launched: 19 February 2021; 5 years ago
- Current status: Active

In November 2020, Stan began to acquire sports rights in association with Nine's Wide World of Sports. These events are carried in a new add-on subscription known as Stan Sport, while the Nine Network holds free-to-air rights to portions of these packages.

In 2021, Stan and Nine began a three-year contract with Rugby Australia to air rugby union on the Nine Network and Stan. Ending a long-standing agreement with Fox Sports and Network 10, Stan holds the pay television rights, streaming all Super Rugby and Super W matches live and ad-free, as well as coverage of inbound tests involving Australia, Argentina, New Zealand, and South Africa, club matches, The Rugby Championship, the Bledisloe Cup, and the Shute Shield, among others.

Stan and Nine also acquired rights to the French Open and Wimbledon tennis tournaments.

In June 2021, Stan announced the acquisition of the rights to UEFA club competitions, including the UEFA Champions League beginning in August 2021. In the same announcement it was also revealed that the Australian Open would be broadcast on the platform.

On 30 June 2025, Nine Entertainment (owner of Stan) acquired all broadcasting rights from Optus Sport for approximately AUD$300 million. All broadcasting rights will be transferred to Stan Sport, with Optus Sport to cease operations on 1 August 2025.

Sport	Event	Broadcast partners	Dates	Notes
Summer Olympics	Paris 2024, Los Angeles 2028, Brisbane 2032	Nine Network	2024, 2028, 2032	
Summer Paralympic Games	Paris 2024, Los Angeles 2028, Brisbane 2032	Nine Network	2024, 2028, 2032	
Winter Olympics	Milan Cortina 2026, French Alps 2030	Nine Network	2026, 2030	
Winter Paralympic Games	Milan Cortina 2026, French Alps 2030	Nine Network	2026, 2030	
Winter Youth Olympics	Gangwon 2024	Nine Network	2024	
Cycling	UCI Road World Championships		2022–present	
Motor racing	Indianapolis 500		2022–present	
Motor racing	IndyCar Series		2022–present	
Motor racing	Formula E World Championship		2022–present	All races and qualifying sessions live and on-demand.
Motor racing	World Endurance Championship		2022–present	
Motor racing	World Rally Championship		2022–present	
Netball	INF Netball World Cup	Nine Network	2027	
Netball	Suncorp Super Netball	Nine Network	2027–present	
Netball	Australian Diamonds Internationals	Nine Network	2027–present	
Netball	Constellation Cup	Nine Network	2027–present	
Rugby union	Major League Rugby		2024–present	live and on-demand
Rugby union	Six Nations		2022–present	All matches live and on-demand
Rugby union	Super Rugby Pacific	Nine Network	2021–present	All matches live and on-demand
Rugby union	Super W	9Go! or 9Gem	2021–present	All matches live and on-demand
Rugby union	Wallabies tests	Nine Network	2021–present	All test matches featuring the Wallabies live and on-demand; including the Bledisloe Cup
Rugby union	Wallaroos tests		2021–present	All test matches featuring the Wallaroos live and on-demand
Rugby union	The Rugby Championship	Nine Network	2021–present	Every championship match live and on-demand
Rugby union	Premiership Rugby		2021–present	All matches live and on-demand
Rugby union	Shute Shield	Nine Network	2021–present	All matches live and on-demand
Rugby union	Six Nations Championship		2021–present	All matches live and on-demand
Rugby union	Women's Six Nations Championship		2022–present	All matches live and on-demand
Rugby union	British & Irish Lions tour to Australia		2025–present	All matches live and on-demand
Rugby union	Nations Championship		2026–present	All matches live and on-demand
Rugby union	World Rugby Nations Cup		2026–present	All matches live and on-demand
Football	Emirates FA Cup		Aug 2025–present	All matches live and on-demand, including a Community Shield
Football	Adobe WFA Cup		Aug 2025–present	Every matches live and on-demand, starting from 2025-26 semis
Football	English Premier League		Aug 2025–present	All matches live and on-demand
Football	Women's Super League		Aug 2025–present	
Football	J1 League		Aug 2025–present	Up to four matches per-week live and on-demand, excluding the J.League 100 Years Vision League
Football	K League 1		Aug 2025–present	
Football	National Women's Soccer League		2025–present	All matches live and on-demand
Football	UEFA Women's Championship		2025–present	All matches Live and on-demand
Football	UEFA Champions League	9Gem (final only)	2021–present	All matches live and on-demand
Football	UEFA Conference League	9Gem (2025–, final only)	2021–present	All matches live and on-demand
Football	UEFA Europa League	9Gem (final only)	2021–present	All matches live and on-demand
Football	UEFA Super Cup		2021–present	Live and on-demand
Football	UEFA Youth League		2021–present	Live and on-demand
Tennis	Australian Open	Nine Network	2022–present	
Tennis	French Open	Nine Network	2021–present	All matches on all courts live, some available on-demand.
Tennis	Wimbledon Championships	Nine Network	2021–present	All matches on all courts live, some available on-demand.
Tennis	The Laver Cup		2021–present	All matches on all courts live, some available on-demand.
Tennis	US Open	Nine Network	2021–present	All matches on all courts live, some available on-demand.
Tennis	WTA Tour	beIN Sports (sub-licensed)	2026–present	

=== Magazine programs ===
Sport	Program	Years
Rugby Union	Rugby Heaven	2021
Rugby Union	Wraparound	2021
Rugby Union	Conversation with Campo	2021
Rugby Union	Club Land	2022
Rugby Union	Breakdown	2021 (Sky Sport simulcast)
Rugby Union	Rugby Nation	2021 (Sky Sport simulcast)
Rugby Union	Aotearoa Rugby Show	2021 (Sky Sport simulcast)
Rugby Union	Play Makers Rugby Stories	2021 (Sky Sport simulcast)
Rugby Union	Sky Rugby Club	2021 (Sky Sport simulcast)
Football	Stan Sport FC	2021
Football	Two Up Top	2021
Tennis	Grand Slam Daily	2022

=== Commentators ===
Rugby union

- Nick McArdle (host – Internationals), 2021–present
- Roz Kelly (host – Internationals), 2021–present
- Sean Maloney (main caller – Internationals), 2021–present
- Andrew Swain (secondary caller – Internationals), 2021–present
- Michael Chennel (caller – Super W), 2021
- Martin Lippiatt (caller – Super W), 2021
- Greg Clark (caller – Super W), 2021
- Tim Horan (expert analysis), 2021–present
- Drew Mitchell (expert analysis), 2021–present
- Andrew Mehrtens (expert analysis), 2021–present
- Allana Ferguson (expert analysis), 2021–present
- Morgan Turinui (expert analysis), 2021–present
- Justin Harrison (expert analysis), 2021–present
- David Campese (expert analysis), 2021–present
- Michael Cheika (expert analysis), 2021–present
- Will Genia (expert analysis), 2021–present
- Sonny Bill Williams (expert analysis), 2021–present
- James Horwill (expert analysis), 2021–present
- Heath Tessmann (expert analysis), 2021–present
- Sera Naiqama (expert analysis), 2021–present
- Dane Haylett-Petty (expert analysis), 2021–present
- Gemma Etheridge (expert analysis, Sideline), 2021
- Alicia Lucas (expert analysis, Sideline), 2021
- Nick Stiles (expert analysis), 2021
- Pat McCabe (expert analysis), 2021
- Mollie Gray (sideline), 2021
- Mick Colliss (WA sideline), 2021–present
- Clint Stanaway (VIC sideline), 2021–present
- Paddy Sweeney (WA sideline), 2021–present
- Michael Atkinson (host – Internationals), 2021–present
- Jeff McTainsh (NZ sideline), 2021–present

Tennis (French Open, Wimbledon)

- Nick McArdle (host), 2021–present
- Roz Kelly (host), 2021–present
- Darren Parkinhost (host), 2021–present
- Clint Stanaway (host), 2021–present
- Todd Woodbridge (host/commentator), 2021–present
- Brett Philips (host/commentator), 2021–present
- Sam Groth (commentator), 2021–present
- Jelena Dokic (commentator), 2021–present
- Wally Masur, 2022–present
- Chris Stubbs, 2022–present

Football (Champions League)

- Max Rushden (host), 2021–2024
- Adam Peacock (host), 2024–present
- Craig Foster (commentator), 2021–present
- Mark Bosnich (commentator), 2021–present
- Mark Pougatch (sideline commentator), 2021–present
- Semra Hunter (sideline commentator), 2022–present
- Katie Shanahan (sideline commentator), 2023–present

== Stan Pay-Per-View ==
Stan Pay-Per-View, formerly Stan Event, is an add-on pay-per-view proposition for boxing events. In November 2025, a 12-month agreement was signed with Tasman Fighters, who promoted cruiserweight world champion Jai Opetaia.

== Marketing and subscription numbers ==
At launch, Australian actress Rebel Wilson promoted the service.

Parent company Fairfax Media claimed they were approaching 100,000 customers by March 2015, however, many of these customers were on a 30-day trial period. In May 2015, Fairfax announced the service was nearing 200,000 subscribers and had a target of 300,000 to 400,000 by the year's end.

In May 2015, Roy Morgan Research found that Netflix had 1.039 million Australian users, compared to 97,000 for former competitor Presto and 91,000 for Stan. In October 2015, Nine Entertainment claimed that Stan had between 150,000 and 200,000 paying subscribers, which they said was ahead of Presto's estimated 100,000 customers.

One year after its launch, CEO Mike Sneesby announced that 1.5 million users had used the service across almost 700,000 subscriptions. In December 2016 Stan claimed to have 600,000 active subscribers. In November 2017 it was reported that the service had over 800,000 active subscribers and revenue topping $100 million a year.

Stan reached 1 million active subscribers in June 2018. By December 2019, the service had over 1.8 million subscribers.

As of August 2020, Stan passed the 2 million subscriber mark, reaching 2.1 million subscribers in total.

As of May 2021, Stan passed 2.3 million active subscribers and more than 4 million people that had entered their credit card details on the platform. Stan gained nearly 150,000 sport subscribers since it began broadcasting rugby union matches earlier this year.

=== Subscribers ===
Date	Paying subscribers	Total subscribers	Stan Sport subscribers	Ref
As of March 2015	not stated	100,000	n/a	
As of May 2015	91,000	200,000	n/a	
As of October 2015	200,000	not stated	n/a	
As of January 2016	600,000	1,500,000	n/a	
As of November 2017	800,000	not stated	n/a	
As of June 2018	1,000,000+	not stated	n/a	
As of December 2019	1,800,000	not stated	n/a	
As of August 2020	2,000,000	2,100,000	n/a	
As of May 2021	2,300,000	not stated	150,000	
As of August 2022	2,500,000	not stated	not stated	
As of February 2023	2,600,000	not stated	not stated	

View source data.

== Supported devices ==
=== Hardware supported ===
The devices on this list are supported by Stan:

- Apple TV (since 13 May 2015)
- Apple iPad Pro 12.9" and 9.7"
- Apple iPad 2 and all later generations
- Apple iPad Air and all later generations
- Apple iPad Mini and all later generations
- Android tablets and phones running Jelly Bean 4.2 or higher
- Google Chromecast
- Fetch TV
- Hubbl
- Sony PlayStation 3 (since 8 October 2015)
- Sony PlayStation 4 (since 8 October 2015)
- Sony PlayStation 5 (since 12 November 2020)
- Microsoft Xbox One (since 13 January 2016)
- Microsoft Xbox Series X and Series S
- Telstra TV (Since December 2015)

Stan does not support jailbroken iOS devices.

=== Software supported ===
Supported web browsers by platform:

- macOS: Safari, Google Chrome, WebKit or Firefox
- Windows: Safari, Google Chrome, Internet Explorer, Microsoft Edge, Opera or Firefox
- Linux: Google Chrome or Firefox
- Apple iOS
- Apple tvOS
- Android

== See also ==
- 9Now
- Hayu (streaming service)
- Internet television in Australia
- Subscription television in Australia
- List of streaming media services
