= Nine News Sydney =

Australia TV news program

- Also known as: Channel 9 News (1956–1969); National Nine News (1969–1976, 1980–2008); 9 Eyewitness News (1976–1980)
- Genre: News
- Presented by: News: Peter Overton (Sunday – Thursday); Mark Burrows (Friday & Saturday); Sport: James Bracey (Sunday – Thursday); Zac Bailey (Friday & Saturday); Weather: Jane Goldsmith (Sunday – Tuesday); Kate Creedon (Wednesday – Saturday)
- Theme music composer: Frank Gari
- Opening theme: Cool Hand Luke: The "Tar Sequence" by Lalo Schifrin
- Country of origin: Australia
- Original language: English

Production
- Production location: North Sydney, New South Wales
- Running time: One hour (including commercials)

Original release
- Network: Nine Network
- Release: 17 September 1956 – present

Nine News Sydney is the local news bulletin for the Nine Network station in Sydney, airing across New South Wales and Australian Capital Territory each night.

Like all Nine News bulletins, the Sydney bulletin runs for one hour from 6pm every day. It covers the day's latest local, national and international news, as well as sport, weather and finance.

== History ==
Reporter Laura Tunstall interviewing a rail officer at Sydney Olympic Park.

The Sydney bulletin was presented by Brian Henderson from 1964 until his retirement in November 2002, with then-Sunday presenter Jim Waley taking over in early 2003.

In 2005, despite the fact that National Nine News Sydney continued to retain its long-standing ratings lead over Ten News Sydney and Seven News Sydney in the 2003–04 ratings seasons, Waley was replaced with then-weekend presenter Mark Ferguson. In 2004, National Nine News Sydney won 27 out of a possible 40 ratings weeks. Following this, the 6pm bulletin started to lose its long-time ratings lead to the rival Seven News Sydney.

Mike Munro was the previous weekend news presenter, until he resigned from the Nine Network in July 2008. He presented his last bulletin on Sunday 26 October 2008. He was replaced by Michael Usher.

In January 2009, Mark Ferguson was replaced as weeknight presenter by Peter Overton. Ferguson returned to his weekend news presenting position, which he previously held during Jim Waley's stint as weeknight presenter.

In July 2009, it was revealed that weekend news presenter Mark Ferguson would move to Seven News from October. Ferguson, who had been with Nine for 17 years, was removed immediately from the Sydney weekend bulletin and was replaced by Georgie Gardner. Ferguson continued to present Nine Afternoon News bulletin until his contract expired in September 2009.

Mike Bailey presented weather forecasts on Fridays and Saturdays, until he was sacked in early 2009. Jaynie Seal, who had previously presented weather from Sunday to Thursday, returned to weekday weather presenting. In February 2010, Nine announced that Natalie Gruzlewski would be presenting the weather from Monday to Thursday and also filing lifestyle and entertainment reports for Nine News with Seal presenting weather on Friday to Sunday.

Nine News Sydney is also broadcast to southern and central New South Wales & the ACT in addition to local Nine News bulletins. It is presented from the Nine Network's TCN-9 Studio 1.

On 6 January 2014, all Nine national channels permanently extended their 6pm news service to one hour pushing A Current Affair into the 7pm timeslot.

In November 2017, it was announced that Georgie Gardner had been appointed co-host of Today replacing Lisa Wilkinson. Deborah Knight has been announced as Gardner's successor presenting Nine News Sydney on Friday and Saturday nights.

In January 2019, it was announced that Deborah Knight had been appointed co-host of Today replacing Karl Stefanovic.

In January 2020, Georgie Gardner returned to front the weekend bulletin, replacing Deborah Knight who went on to hosting the radio drive show on 2GB.

In December 2021, weekend sports presenter Erin Molan resigned from the network after 11 years. James Bracey was later announced as her replacement.

In March 2022, Cameron Williams resigned after 16 years at the Nine Network for personal reasons. James Bracey replaced Williams with Roz Kelly replacing Bracey as weekend sports presenter.

In November 2025, it was announced that Amber Sherlock, Nine News weather presenter, had been made redundant, one of several on air faces impacted by job cuts across Broadcast and Streaming Divisions.

In March 2026, Georgie Gardner announced her resignation after more than 20 years with the Nine Network, presenting her last bulletin in April.

In June 2026, Mark Burrows was appointed Friday and Saturday presenter and he has been at the forefront of some of the biggest local and international news stories for the past four decades, replacing Georgie Gardner.

Fill-in presenters for the bulletin include Jayne Azzopardi and Charles Croucher (news), Matt Burke and Zac Bailey (sport) and Kate Creedon and Zara James (weather).

== Current presenters ==
Current presenters
Role	Bulletins						
Role	Sunday	Monday	Tuesday	Wednesday	Thursday	Friday	Saturday
News	Peter Overton (since January 2009)					Mark Burrows (since June 2026)	
Sport	James Bracey (since March 2022)					Zac Bailey (since June 2025)	
Weather	Sophie Walsh (since November 2025)					TBA	TBA

== Fill-in presenters ==
- News: Jayne Azzopardi, Charles Croucher
- Sport: Matt Burke, Zac Bailey
- Weather: Kate Creedon, Zara James

== Previous presenters ==
Note: The current roster for the presenters on Nine News Sydney is the main team present Sunday–Thursday (classified as the Weeknight team below) and the secondary team present Fridays and Saturdays (classed as Weekends below). This was not always the case.

=== Weeknights ===
- Chuck Faulkner (1956–1963)
- Brian Henderson (1964–2002)
- Jim Waley (2003–2005)
- Mark Ferguson (2006–2008)

=== Weekends ===
- Brian Henderson (1957–1964)
- Ian Ross through the 1970s, 1980s and 1990s.
- Mark Ferguson (2003–2005, 2009)
- Mike Munro (2005–2008)
- Michael Usher (2008–2009)
- Georgie Gardner (2009–2017, 2020–2026)
- Deborah Knight (2017–2019)

=== Sport ===
- Ken Sutcliffe (1982–2016)
- Yvonne Sampson (Friday Nights) (2016)
- Cameron Williams (2016–2022)

Weekend Sport:

- Stephanie Brantz (2008–2010)
- Andrew Voss (2010)
- Cameron Williams (2010–2015)
- Erin Molan (2016–2021)
- Roz Kelly (2022–2025)

=== Weather ===
- Alan Wilkie (1977–2001)
- Georgie Gardner (2002–2004)
- Jaynie Seal (2004–2006)
- Majella Wiemers (2006–2007)
- Jaynie Seal (2007–2010)
- Natalie Gruzlewski (2010–2012)
- Amber Sherlock (2012–2025)

Weekend Weather:

- Jaynie Seal (2002–2004)
- Majella Wiemers (2006)
- Jaynie Seal (2006–2007)
- Mike Bailey (2007–2009)
- Jaynie Seal (2010–2011)
- Amber Sherlock (2011–2012)
- Sylvia Jeffreys (2012–2014)
- Natalia Cooper (2014–2015)
- Belinda Russell (2013–2026)

== Reporters ==
=== News ===
- Massilia Aili
- Annalise Bolt
- Elizabeth Bryan
- Mark Burrows (senior reporter)
- Kate Creedon
- Mike Dalton (features reporter)
- Hayley Francis
- Tiffiny Genders (chief court reporter)
- Alex Heinke
- Bailey Kenzie
- Helene Lambetsos
- Eddy Meyer (senior reporter)
- Emma Partridge (senior crime editor)
- Alison Piotrowski
- Gabriella Rogers (health reporter)
- Damian Ryan (senior reporter)
- Madison Scott
- Sophie Walsh
- James Wilson
- Effie Zahos (Money Editor)

=== Sport ===
- Zac Bailey
- Michael Chammas
- Sam Djordan (Cricket reporter)
- Luke Dufficy
- Emma Lawrence
- Tom Marriott
- Danika Mason
- Samantha Poate
- Danny Weidler (chief rugby league reporter)

=== Notable former reporters ===
- Charles Croucher (now 9News Political Editor, based in Canberra)
- Chris O'Keefe (former Drive Host, 2GB Radio)

== Ratings ==
The bulletin was the most popular service in New South Wales. When long-serving anchor, Brian Henderson retired at the end of 2002, and Ian Ross moved to Seven at the end of 2003, ratings quickly declined (Nine out-rated Ten and Seven during Jim Waley's tenure in 2003–04), and Nine won 27 out of a possible 40 weeks in 2004. Nine replaced Jim Waley with a much younger presenter, Mark Ferguson, then aged just 38. Whilst ratings were starting to slightly increase, the bulletin slipped to third, behind both Seven News and ABC News.

In 2008, the station did not win a single week in Sydney (five years previous it won every single week), Ferguson was moved back to the weekend position and replaced by Peter Overton. For his first month, ratings slipped to fourth, behind Ten News at Five, before quickly catching up to trail ABC News. Towards the end of 2009, Nine's ratings started to improve, with this surge in viewership coinciding with the retirement of Ian Ross as the anchor of the rival Seven News Sydney.

In July 2020, Nine News Sydney achieved the top ratings for the tenth consecutive year. In August 2022, Nine News Sydney achieved the top ratings for the twelfth consecutive year.
