= Yvonne Sampson =

Australian television sports presenter

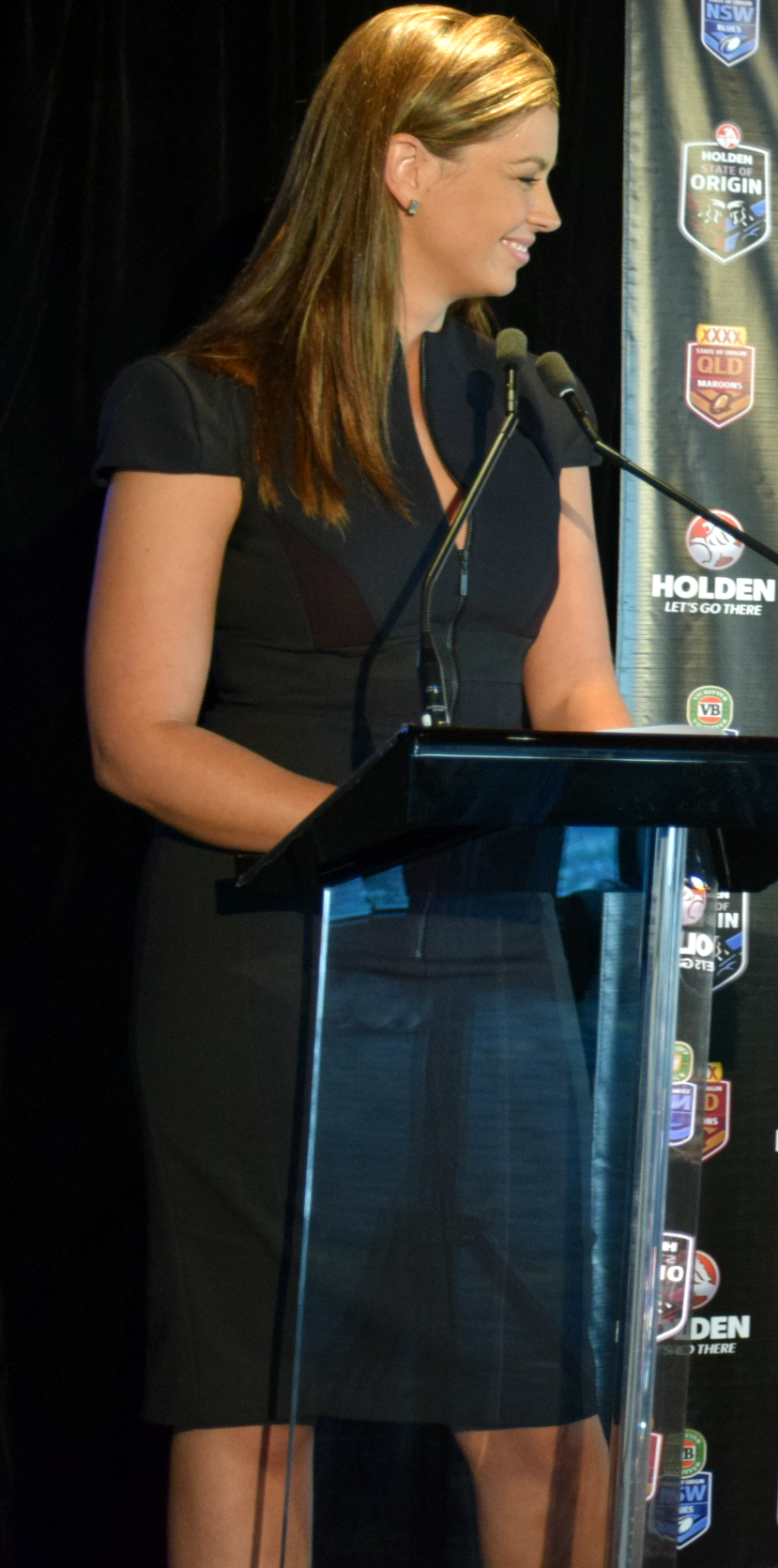
- Born: Yvonne Sampson; 21 July 1980 (age 46); Townsville, Queensland, Australia
- Occupation: Television presenter
- Years active: 2005–present
- Spouse: Chris O'Keefe (m. 2018)

Yvonne Sampson (born 21 July 1980) is an Australian television sports presenter and commentator.

Sampson currently works for Fox Sports. She has previously worked for Nine's Wide World of Sports and was weekend sports presenter for Nine News Sydney.

== Early life ==
Sampson grew up on the Sunshine Coast, Queensland, Australia on a farm near Palmwoods.

Sampson is of Indigenous Australian heritage, with her paternal grandmother being indigenous.

== Television career ==
With a little help of a chance encounter between her taxi-driving father and former NRL player Wendell Sailor, Sampson began her career as a cadet reporter at the Seven Network's regional news service, Seven Local News on the Sunshine Coast working one day a week, while juggling her studies at the Queensland University of Technology and employment with the Eagle Farm Equine Hospital.

Upon completion of her studies, Sampson joined the network permanently as a sports reporter, working throughout the state in cities such as Maryborough, Mackay and Townsville before returning to the Sunshine Coast to also becoming a studio presenter.

In 2012, Sampson returned to Queensland, joining the Nine Network in Brisbane. In January 2014, Sampson was offered the opportunity to return to Sydney to be more extensively involved with Nine's Wide World of Sports coverage including presenting the sport on Nine News Sydney.

In 2015, she co-commentated the NRL grand final between the North Queensland Cowboys and the Brisbane Broncos. She is quoted saying that this was the greatest and most challenging assignment she’d had on a football field, due to the emotion and excitement of the ending.

In 2016, she became the host of the Sunday Footy Show, replacing long time host Peter Sterling. The same year, Sampson also became the first woman to anchor the network's State of Origin coverage.

In December 2016, she signed a multi-year deal with Fox Sports. It was announced that she would host the network's Thursday and Saturday night rugby league coverage and also host a new weekly show called League Life.

In June 2021, she joined the panel as the new host of Fox League show, NRL 360, after Ben Ikin moved to the Brisbane Broncos.

== Personal life ==
In April 2017, Sampson announced that she was engaged to Nine News reporter Chris O'Keefe.

The couple welcomed their first child in April 2022. In June 2025, Sampson announced she was expecting their second.

Media offices
Preceded by Cameron Williams	Nine News Sydney sport presenter (Friday and Saturday); February 2016 – December 2016	Succeeded by Erin Molan
Preceded by Peter Sterling	NRL Sunday Footy Show host 2016	Succeeded by James Bracey
Preceded by Cameron Williams & Peter Sterling	Nine's rugby league coverage host 2013–2016	Succeeded by James Bracey
