= Roz Kelly (sports presenter) =

Australian television sports presenter

- Occupation: TV presenter
- Spouse: Morné Morkel (m. 2014)
- Children: 2

Roz Kelly is an Australian television sports presenter.

== Career ==
She has previously been the sports presenter for the Friday and Saturday editions of Nine News Sydney as well as host of the Nine Network’s flagship sports program Wide World of Sports.

Kelly was also involved in Nine's Wide World of Sports coverage of tennis, cricket and Stan Sport’s rugby union coverage. Kelly was part of the Nine Network's commentary team for 2012 London Olympics and the 2024 Paris Olympics.

== Personal life ==
She is married to South African cricketer Morné Morkel and they have 2 sons. She currently lives on the Northern Beaches of Sydney.

She previously dated TV vet Chris Brown in 2012.

In November 2013, Kelly announced she would be moving to Cape Town in South Africa to be with her then fiancé Morné Morkel. In 2018, Kelly announced she intended to return to Australia following her husband's retirement from international cricket.

== See also ==
- List of Nine Network presenters

Media offices
Preceded by	Nine News Sydney; Sport presenter (Friday to Saturday); March 2022 – May 2025	Succeeded by Incumbent
Preceded by James Bracey	Sports Sunday; Host; 2021–2025	Succeeded by Incumbent
