= Erin Molan =

Australian newscaster (born 1983)

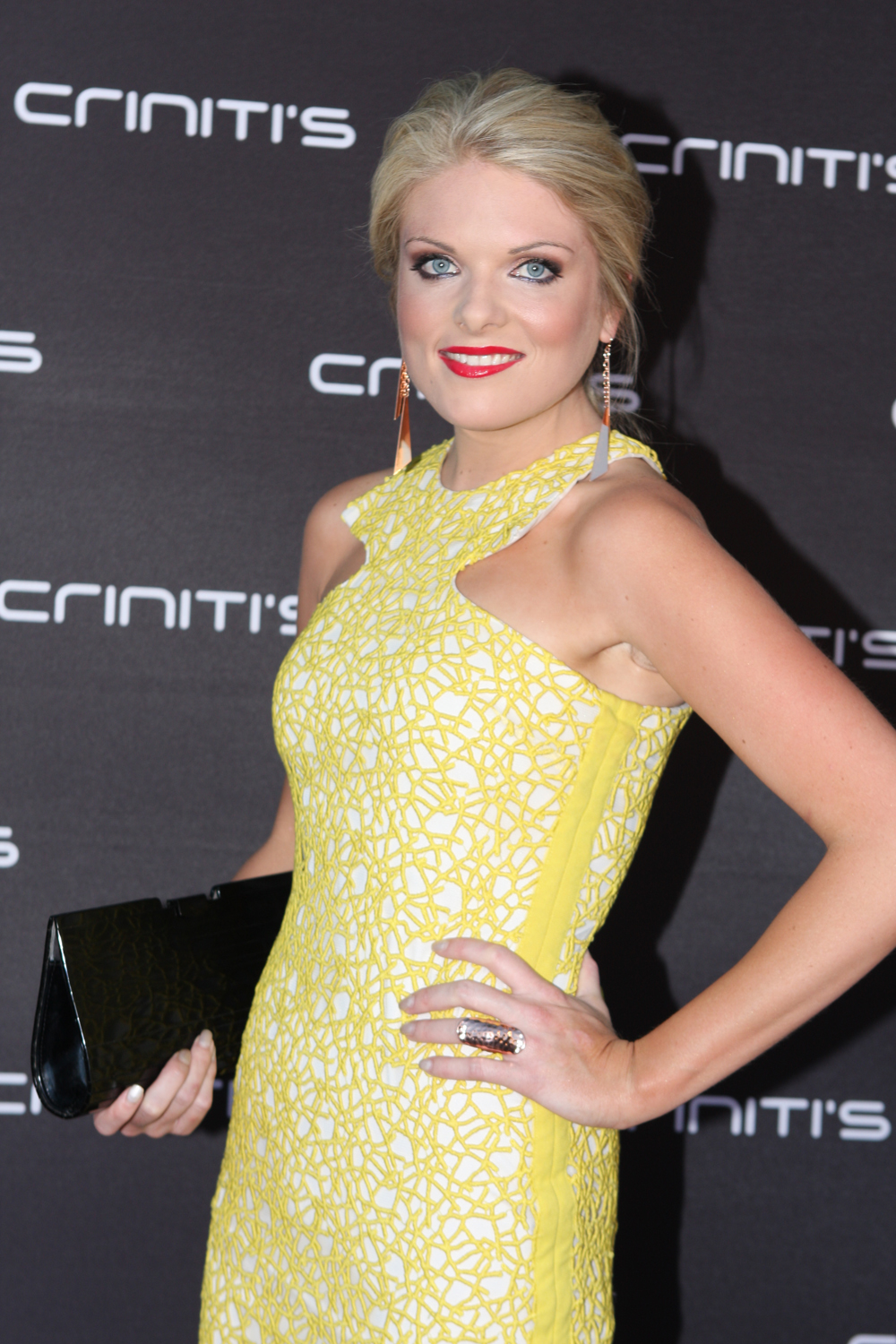
- Molan in 2013
- Born: 24 August 1983 (age 43); Canberra, Australia
- Occupations: Television presenter, radio presenter, columnist
- Years active: 2008−present
- Employer: freelance
- Known for: The NRL Footy Show (2012–2018); The Sunday Footy Show (2012–2021); Nine News Sydney (2016–2021); 69 X Minutes (2025); The Erin Molan Show (2025-present)
- Children: 1
- Father: Jim Molan

Erin Molan (born 24 August 1983) is an Australian podcaster, host of the Erin Molan Show, who previously worked on Sky News Australia, a past radio presenter on 2Day FM and a former columnist for Sydney newspaper The Daily Telegraph.

Molan was previously with the Nine Network as part of Nine's Wide World of Sports National Rugby League (NRL) coverage. From 2019, she hosted the secondary broadcast for channel 9Gem of the Australian Open tennis tournament. Molan was also Friday and Saturday sports presenter on Nine News Sydney and the host of The Sunday Footy Show and former host of The NRL Footy Show.

== Early life ==
Molan was born in Canberra and raised in Jakarta, Indonesia. Her father, Jim Molan, was a senior officer in the Australian army. Due to his career, the family frequently moved, both in Australia and overseas. As a result of these transitions, Erin attended sixteen different schools while growing up in a multicultural environment. Erin attributes her pursuit of a career in media to this early experience as well as being raised with strong values of discipline and resilience.

== Career ==
Molan's first job in media was with a community television station in Canberra. She then gained a job for WIN Television as a reporter and presenter, and moved to Sydney in 2010 to work for the Nine Network. In 2012, she joined The NRL Footy Show on a regular basis, appearing mainly on the "League of their Own" segment, as well as being their roving reporter. In 2014, Molan became a permanent co-host of the program working alongside Paul Vautin, Darryl Brohman, Beau Ryan, and former test cricketer Michael Slater. Molan also appeared on The Sunday Footy Show as a regular starting in 2012, mainly doing the "Around the Grounds" segment reporting.

Molan hosted Nine's Wide World of Sports' coverage of the 2017 Fast5 Netball World Series. In May 2017, in the aftermath of domestic violence charges against Parramatta player Semi Radradra being dropped, Molan was publicly slammed by a small number of fans and by sections of the media for supposedly painting Radradra as being guilty and not giving the player the presumption of innocence when the allegations were first aired. Molan was asked by fans and the media to make a public apology to Radradra but no apology was forthcoming; Molan had publicly stated that Radradra deserved the presumption of innocence, and rather than being specific about his case, her comments were about what the NRL's stance ought to be in the event of domestic violence being found proven against any player, regardless of caliber.

It was announced on 3 October 2018 that, after twenty-four years, The NRL Footy Show would be axed following the worst slide in ratings in the show's history. In December 2021, Molan resigned from the Nine Network to join Sky News Australia as a primetime contributor. In August 2018, Molan and The Sunday Footy Show issued former NRL player Dave Taylor with an apology after being accused of fat shaming the player during a video segment.

In June 2020, Molan was criticised for mocking the name of Tongan Rugby League player Haumole Olakau'atu on the 2GB radio program The Continuous Call. Molan alleges that her nonsensical imitation of Olakau'atu's name was in reference to a previous discussion between the radio hosts where they grappled with how to correctly pronounce Pacific Islander names. Molan left the program at the end of the 2020 season. In March 2023, Molan settled a legal case against Daily Mail Australia which she claimed had defamed her by publishing reports about this matter. The case was resolved in mediation.

Also in December 2021, Molan declined an approach to run as the Liberal Party of Australia candidate for the Division of Eden-Monaro in the 2022 Australian election, saying her future political ambitions with the Liberals are "down the track".

In December 2024, Molan was abruptly fired from her position on Sky News. After her firing, she went on a trip to Israel, where she met with the country's president Isaac Herzog as well as relatives of hostages held by Hamas. Herzog praised Molan for her "moral clarity" in siding with Israel in its Gaza war. When asked why she was fired, she said it was due to "budget cuts".

In February 2025, Molan became the host for 69 X Minutes, a news show funded by Elon Musk, which aired on X (formerly Twitter). Since September 2025, 69X Minutes moved to being published solely on X; Molan is now hosting a podcast, The Erin Molan Show, a conservative-leaning news and commentary program in partnership with Salem Media Group that airs three times a week.

=== Awards and Honors ===
- Best Newcomer On-Air, ACRA (2017)
- Best On-Air Team, ACRA (2019)
- Honorary Doctorate from Reichman University (2025)
- Atlas Award for Moral Courage, Ayn Rand Center (2025)
- 'Beacon of Truth' Award, (2025)

== Personal life ==
In April 2017, Molan announced her engagement to policeman Sean Ogilvy. Their daughter was born in 2018. Three years later, Molan announced her relationship with fiancé Ogilvy had broken down.

Molan is a Roman Catholic.

== See also ==
- List of Nine Network presenters

Media offices
Preceded by Yvonne Sampson	Nine News Sydney; Sport presenter (Friday and Saturday); December 2016 – December 2021	Succeeded by James Bracey
Preceded by Michael Slater	NRL Footy Show; Host; 2015–2018; With: Paul Vautin (2015–2017); Solo (2018)	Succeeded by Program axed
Preceded by James Bracey	NRL Sunday Footy Show; Host; 2018–2021	Succeeded by Danika Mason
