= Nathan Brown (Australian footballer, born 1978) =

Australian rules footballer

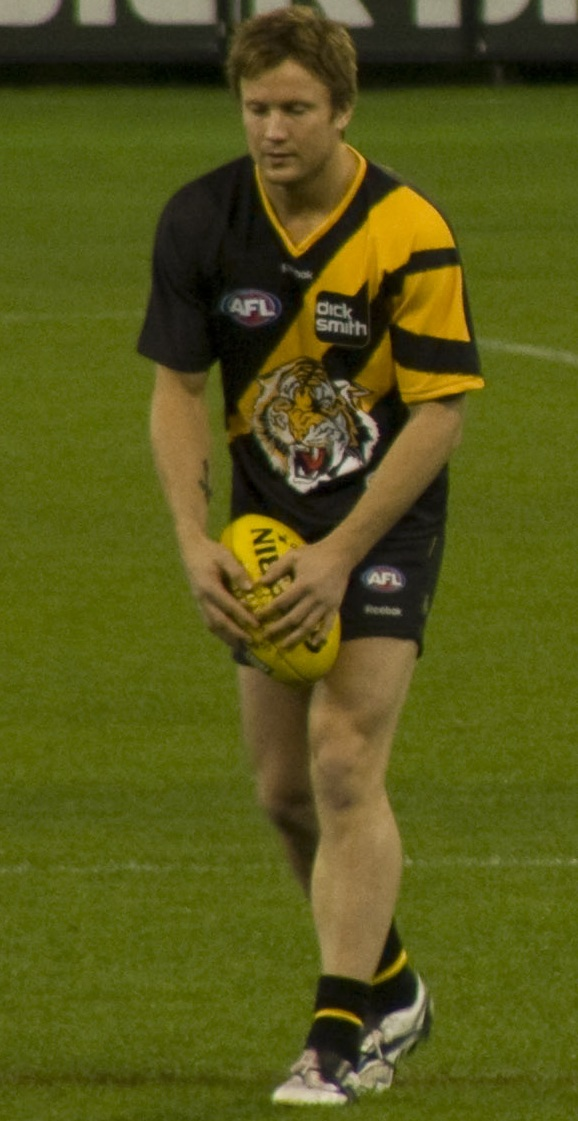
- Photographed in April 2009

Personal information
- Full name: Nathan Gary Brown
- Nicknames: Browny, Noodles
- Born: 10 February 1978 (age 48); Victoria
- Original team: Bendigo Pioneers (TAC Cup)/Golden Square
- Draft: 10th overall, 1996; Western Bulldogs
- Height: 183 cm (6 ft 0 in)
- Weight: 80 kg (176 lb)
- Position: Half forward flank

Playing career^{1}
| Years | Club | Games (Goals) |
| 1997–2003 | Western Bulldogs | 137 (206) |
| 2004–2009 | Richmond | 82 (143) |
| Total | | 219 (349) |
- ^{1} Playing statistics correct to the end of round 22 2009.

Career highlights
- Morrish Medal: 1996; 2x All-Australian: 2001, 2002; 4x International Rules Series: 2000, 2002, 2003, 2004; Jim Stynes Medal: 2004

Nathan Gregory Brown (born 10 February 1978) is a radio and television football commentator and a former Australian rules footballer for Richmond and the Western Bulldogs in the AFL. He played a total of 219 senior AFL matches and kicked 349 goals. His playing career ended after Richmond told him at the end of 2009 that he would no longer be required as a player.

Nathan Brown played tennis growing up, and he is known for defeating former Australian tennis professional Peter Luczak 6–3 6–4 on grass in a Warrnambool Under-14s tournament. Recruited from Golden Square and then the Bendigo Pioneers in the TAC Cup to the Western Bulldogs in the AFL, Brown made a name for himself as a dangerous medium-sized forward.

He played with the Bulldogs from 1997 to 2003, and he left the club after a more lucrative contract was offered by Richmond. At the time, the Western Bulldogs had asked many of their high-profile players to take pay cuts to support the team financially.

== Richmond playing career ==
Having been part of the Western Bulldogs side that took out the wooden spoon in 2003, Brown's first season at Richmond did not see any improvement, as the Tigers went on to finish last in 2004 after losing their final fourteen games of the season.

In 2005, Brown continued to perform for the Tigers, partly due to his former coach at the Western Bulldogs, Terry Wallace taking over, and put in a string of match-winning performances in the early part of the season, including a sensational last-quarter burst against Collingwood in Round 8. In this game, Richmond turned a 10-point deficit into a 35-point victory, thanks to Brown's five last-quarter goals. The following week against Brisbane, Brown added four goals to be one of the match winners along with Shane Tuck. By this point, Richmond were firmly entrenched in the top four with a 7–2 win–loss record, and Brown had kicked 32 goals.

However, in Round 10 against Melbourne, Brown broke his leg attempting a left-foot kick as Melbourne defender Matthew Whelan dived across him in a legitimate attempt to smother the ball. Brown's right foot became stuck on the Telstra Dome surface and tilted a bit to the right. The injury even sickened media personality Robert Walls, who was watching the match on television, to the extent that he had to turn off his television. Richmond lost the game by 57 points, and would only record three more wins thereafter to finish in 12th place on the ladder.

Brown had a titanium rod inserted into his tibia, and he underwent extensive therapy and rehabilitation training over the following pre-season. Despite this, Brown would suffer further complications from his broken leg, among other injuries, eventually leading to his retirement at the end of the 2009 season.

In 2007, with Richmond languishing at the bottom of the ladder, Brown did not play a match at senior level until Round 12, when Richmond defeated Melbourne by 49 points for its first win of the season, with Brown kicking three goals.

Brown played his 200th game against Melbourne at Telstra Dome in Round 12, 2008. Richmond won this match by 22 points.

=== Retirement ===
In November 2009, Brown announced his retirement from the AFL. He stated that there was interest from other clubs to pick him up, although he believed a persistent groin injury would not stand up to another season of AFL football.

=== Post-AFL career ===
In 2013, Brown made a one-off guest appearance for the North Launceston Football Club in the TSL.

== Statistics ==
Legend
| G | Goals | K | Kicks | D | Disposals | T | Tackles |
| B | Behinds | H | Handballs | M | Marks |

| Season | Team | No. | Games | Totals | | | | | | | Averages (per game) | | | | | | | Votes |
| Season | Team | No. | Games | G | B | K | H | D | M | T | G | B | K | H | D | M | T | Votes |
|---|---|---|---|---|---|---|---|---|---|---|---|---|---|---|---|---|---|---|
| 1997 | Western Bulldogs | 17 | 14 | 10 | 11 | 107 | 35 | 142 | 34 | 7 | 0.7 | 0.8 | 7.6 | 2.5 | 10.1 | 2.4 | 0.5 | 3 |
| 1998 | Western Bulldogs | 17 | 12 | 6 | 5 | 120 | 68 | 188 | 38 | 8 | 0.5 | 0.4 | 10.0 | 5.7 | 15.7 | 3.2 | 0.7 | 2 |
| 1999 | Western Bulldogs | 17 | 22 | 19 | 14 | 225 | 110 | 335 | 81 | 17 | 0.9 | 0.6 | 10.2 | 5.0 | 15.2 | 3.7 | 0.8 | 7 |
| 2000 | Western Bulldogs | 17 | 23 | 26 | 13 | 332 | 210 | 542 | 128 | 22 | 1.1 | 0.6 | 14.4 | 9.1 | 23.6 | 5.6 | 1.0 | 2 |
| 2001 | Western Bulldogs | 17 | 22 | 32 | 29 | 318 | 147 | 465 | 117 | 30 | 1.5 | 1.3 | 14.5 | 6.7 | 21.1 | 5.3 | 1.4 | 7 |
| 2002 | Western Bulldogs | 17 | 22 | 57 | 24 | 289 | 110 | 399 | 123 | 21 | 2.6 | 1.1 | 13.1 | 5.0 | 18.1 | 5.6 | 1.0 | 13 |
| 2003 | Western Bulldogs | 17 | 22 | 56 | 51 | 245 | 88 | 333 | 122 | 29 | 2.5 | 2.3 | 11.1 | 4.0 | 15.1 | 5.5 | 1.3 | 5 |
| 2004 | Richmond | 7 | 20 | 26 | 28 | 341 | 126 | 467 | 93 | 40 | 1.3 | 1.4 | 17.1 | 6.3 | 23.4 | 4.7 | 2.0 | 8 |
| 2005 | Richmond | 7 | 10 | 34 | 19 | 149 | 53 | 202 | 66 | 10 | 3.4 | 1.9 | 14.9 | 5.3 | 20.2 | 6.6 | 1.0 | 7 |
| 2006 | Richmond | 7 | 10 | 11 | 17 | 93 | 28 | 121 | 53 | 9 | 1.1 | 1.7 | 9.3 | 2.8 | 12.1 | 5.3 | 0.9 | 0 |
| 2007 | Richmond | 7 | 11 | 21 | 14 | 131 | 43 | 174 | 70 | 21 | 1.9 | 1.3 | 11.9 | 3.9 | 15.8 | 6.4 | 1.9 | 0 |
| 2008 | Richmond | 7 | 18 | 35 | 21 | 249 | 119 | 368 | 111 | 31 | 1.9 | 1.2 | 13.8 | 6.6 | 20.4 | 6.2 | 1.7 | 3 |
| 2009 | Richmond | 7 | 13 | 16 | 11 | 148 | 84 | 232 | 62 | 24 | 1.2 | 0.8 | 11.4 | 6.5 | 17.8 | 4.8 | 1.8 | 0 |
| Career | | | 219 | 349 | 257 | 2747 | 1221 | 3968 | 1098 | 269 | 1.6 | 1.2 | 12.5 | 5.6 | 18.1 | 5.0 | 1.2 | 57 |

== Media career ==
In 2010, Brown joined The Sunday Footy Show as a regular panellist. Up until 2014, Brown worked for Triple M as an expert commentator for Saturday night matches alongside Barry Denner, Mark Howard and Ash Chua. He rejoined the station in 2016 as a Friday night commentator and calling one of the Saturday games.

In 2014, Brown joined rival radio station 3AW as a ball-by-ball commentator for Saturday night and Sunday twilight matches.

In October 2014, Brown was appointed sport presenter on Weekend Today, replacing Tim Gilbert.

Brown is a brand ambassador for Sportsbet, appearing regularly in the media to cover AFL odds.

In April 2024, Brown made his boxing debut against fellow former AFL footballer Kane Cornes in an exhibition boxing match in Adelaide. Brown won by unanimous decision in the four-round fight.

=== Gambling ===
Brown's affiliation with Sportsbet and his delivery of odds and tips in television advertisements for the company has been criticised. Brown’s tips have been shown to be largely unsuccessful by social media account @TrackMyBrown, which noted his tips were down $853 nearing the end of the 2024 season, assuming $20 stakes. Brown also co-hosts Sportsbet’s In The Back Pocket podcast.

== Personal life ==
Brown is married to Kristine Fabiyanic and they have three daughters and a son.

== Achievements and honours ==
- Morrish Medal winner 1996
- All-Australian 2001, 2002
- International Rules Series 2000, 2002, 2003, 2004 (Jim Stynes Medal 2004)
- 100 Tiger Treasures "Goal of the Century" Nominee (2008)
