= Tony Jones (sports journalist) =

Australian sports journalist (born 1961)

- Born: 1 October 1961 (age 65); Melbourne, Victoria, Australia
- Other names: Chompers, TJ
- Occupations: TV sports journalist; sport commentator; Number 2 TV presenter; radio presenter
- Years active: 1986–present
- Employer: Nine Network

Tony “Chompers” Jones (born 1 October 1961), is an Australian sports presenter and journalist based in Melbourne.

Jones is currently the sports presenter of Nine News Melbourne on weeknights. He also hosts the network's Australian Open coverage. As of 2026, he has been with the Nine Network for 40 years.

== Career ==
Jones studied at a radio school before beginning his career in radio newsrooms in country Victoria and Melbourne's 3AW. He joined the Nine Network in May 1986, making the move from news to sport.

Jones began presenting weekend sports bulletins in 1988 and moved to weeknight sports presenting in 1990.

In his career, Jones has been most noted for his work with the Nine Network in Australia, as a sports reporter for Nine News and hosting The Sunday Footy Show between 2006 and 2008, before returning as host in 2017. He is the weeknight sport presenter for Nine News Melbourne.

He has been a boundary rider during Nine's AFL coverage between 2002 and 2006 and has co-hosted Prime Time Sport Interactive with Michael Christian on Radio Sport National from March 2010.

He was part of the network's 2006 Melbourne Commonwealth Games coverage. In February 2010, Jones covered the Winter Olympics in Vancouver for the Nine Network.

In 2013, Jones asked Rebecca Judd if she'd like to "come 'round for a barbie" on live news. Judd simply responded, "No, thanks". The clip went viral and caught media attention. In 2016, Jones tried to kiss Rebecca Judd's cheek on live TV to send her off for maternity leave, but Judd infamously rejected his advance, and this clip also went viral, notching up more than a million views on YouTube alone. The kiss attempt is frequently brought up as a running gag on the Sunday Footy Show. Despite the awkward incidents, Judd harboured no ill will, eventually planting a kiss on Jones at the 2018 Brownlow Medal red carpet.

Despite the prevalence of it, he does not like the nickname "Chompers" or its many variations; Chompers is a reference to his artificially whitened teeth.

Jones is also a fill-in presenter on 3AW.

In 2018, it was announced Jones would once again be part of the national Wide World of Sports team as a host at the Australian Open, featuring alongside colleagues James Bracey and Rebecca Maddern from 2019.

In January 2019, the Nine Network announced that Jones would present sport on Today, replacing Tim Gilbert. He remained in the position until November, resigning due to having too many commitments.

In January 2025, whilst presenting the sports news bulletin cross-live at the Australian Open, Jones made a series of insulting and offensive remarks towards vocal Serbian fans behind him prior to Novak Djokovic’s round three match against Tomas Machac. Breaking into song, Jones said "Novak, he’s overrated... Novak’s a has-been... Novak, kick him out.” In the days that followed, Djokovic refused to participate in a post-match interview with Jim Courier as neither the broadcaster, Nine Network, or Jones had yet offered a formal apology. Jones later apologised.
