= Allana Ferguson =

Australia international rugby league player & TV presenter

- Born: 22 May 1993 (age 33); Sydney, New South Wales, Australia
- Occupations: sports commentator; teacher
- Known for: competing as a professional rugby league player
- Television: Nine's Wide World of Sports, The Sunday Footy Show
- Rugby league career

Playing information

Rugby union
Representative
Years	Team	Pld	T	G	FG	P
2013	Australia 7s

Rugby league
- Position: Five-eighth
Club
Years	Team	Pld	T	G	FG	P
2017–18	Cronulla Sharks
Representative
Years	Team	Pld	T	G	FG	P
2015–16	New South Wales
2016	Australia	1	0	0	0	0

Allana Ferguson (born 22 May 1993) is an Australian sports commentator and former professional rugby league and rugby union player.

Ferguson was one of the first women in Australia to sign a professional playing contract with the National Rugby League, and advocated for the establishment of the NRL Women's Premiership.

== Career ==
=== Playing career ===
Ferguson began playing rugby league at the age of four, but as a girl was required to stop when she reached the under 12's age group with girls not being permitted to compete again until the age of 17. In 2016, Ferguson praised the introduction of two new age divisions which enables teenage girls to continue to play rugby league in Under 14's and Under 16's divisions.

In 2013, Ferguson represented Australia in Rugby Sevens before her switch to rugby league.

Playing at five-eighth, Ferguson represented New South Wales in the Women's Interstate Challenge series in 2015 and 2016. She made her debut for the Australian Jillaroos at the 2016 NRL Auckland Nines.

In August 2016, Ferguson was named in the Cronulla Sharks' Nines squad for the local derby against the St. George Illawarra Dragons, which was used as the curtain raiser to an NRL game at Shark Park. She was subsequently signed by the Sharks for the club's 2017 women's season.

At the age of 25 in 2018, Ferguson tore her left ACL for the fourth time, having already torn the same ligament at the ages of 15, 17 and 20. On medical advice, she retired from rugby league.

=== Media career ===
Since retirement, Ferguson has been a rugby league and rugby union commentator for various media outlets, including Nine's Wide World of Sports and 2GB's Continuous Call Team. Ferguson has been a regular panel member on The Sunday Footy Show since 2018.

Ferguson first made her television debut in 2006 at the age of 13 when she was interviewed by Steve Jacobs on Nine's breakfast program Today about not being able to play rugby league as a teenage girl.

In March 2023, Ferguson was listed at #35 on The Sydney Morning Herald's list of the Top 50 Most Influential Women in Sport.

== Personal life ==
After undergoing IVF treatment, Ferguson now has three children.
