= Majella Wiemers =

Australian television journalist

Majella Wiemers (born 1976–1977) is an Australian producer, television news anchor, and weather presenter. She is currently the head of entertainment at Seven Network.

== Career ==
Wiemers was born in Queensland and graduated with a BA in journalism from the University of Queensland in 1996. In 1997, she joined WIN Television as a presenter and reporter in Rockhampton and Cairns. In 1999, Wiemers was promoted to WIN's bureau chief of news. In 2000, she won the Far North Queensland Media Award for best documentary for Cyclone Steve.

In 2001, Wiemers moved to Sydney and joined the Nine Network as a producer on Good Medicine, Nightline and Nine's federal election coverage. In 2002, she was a producer for RPA, one of Australia's most respected reality programs.

She then became a reporter for Today. Wiemers was also a weather presenter for National Nine Early News in 2005 alongside Sharyn Ghidella and Chris Smith.

Wiemers left the Nine Network at the end of 2007 due to contractual issues. Prior to Wiemers leaving Nine she presented the weather on Nine News PM Edition, Nine News Sydney and Nightline while Jaynie Seal was on maternity leave.

In December 2011, she was announced as the executive producer of Breakfast on Network Ten, which launched on 23 February 2012. She quit the show on 6 July 2012.

She joined ITV Studios Australia in March 2018, as their head of entertainment. She worked there until June 2022, when she joined the Seven Network, also as their head of entertainment.

== Personal life ==
Wiemers at 32 years of age, married then 30-year-old Richard Murray in 2009 at a traditional Catholic wedding at Mary Immaculate Church, Annerley. They met in 2006, while Wiemers was working with the Nine Network for A Current Affair.
