= The Sunday Footy Show (AFL) =

Australian sports TV series

- Also known as: The AFL Sunday Footy Show
- Genre: Sport
- Presented by: Tony Jones
- Starring: Damian Barrett; Nathan Brown; Matthew Lloyd; Rory Sloane
- Country of origin: Australia
- Original language: English
- No. of seasons: 30
- No. of episodes: 600+

Production
- Production locations: Docklands, Victoria
- Running time: 120 minutes (including commercials)

Original release
- Network: Nine Network
- Release: 28 March 1993 – present

The AFL Sunday Footy Show is an Australian rules football program aired on the Nine Network on Sunday mornings at 10am to 12pm hosted by Tony Jones with a panel consisting of Damian Barrett, Nathan Brown, Matthew Lloyd and Rory Sloane.

== History and synopsis ==
The Sunday Footy Show was the original incarnation of the Footy Show and was based on the footy show for rugby league which had debuted earlier in 1992. Following its success in 1993, it was decided to present a special Grand Final edition with a live studio audience. The success of this special meant that the Thursday night show was to be installed as a permanent fixture in the Nine schedule. The Sunday Footy Show discusses the weekend's matches so far, showing scores and highlights and interviews players from the sides that have played that round. Before the Nine Network obtained the TV rights to AFL matches, the program was a lighter look at the AFL with a panel hosted by Max Walker and featured the likes of Sam Kekovich, Sam Newman, Ted Whitten and Lou Richards on the panel. It has had numerous formats over the years, but is currently back to a traditional panel program that the show had originally.

Garry Lyon replaced Walker as host in 2000 with many of the panel from the original show replaced over time, with Brian Taylor, Dermott Brereton and Billy Brownless joining as regulars. Nine News Melbourne sports presenter Tony Jones who produced the show while Lyon was host went into the role in 2006 when Lyon became host of the Thursday night program. Jones was host until the end of the 2008 season when he was replaced by James Brayshaw. Mark Bickley and Danny Frawley also left the show at the end of the 2008 season due to other interests, being replaced by the recently retired Shane Crawford and Nathan Thompson. The following year, Taylor due to his commitments with Fox Sports and Peter Larkins, who was the shows resident doctor both left to make room for Damian Barrett and Nathan Brown. In November 2011, Nine announced that Brayshaw would be stepping down as host due to having many commitments, Simon O'Donnell was announced as his replacement while Brereton also departed for Fox Footy and was replaced by Matthew Lloyd, however in November 2012, Nine announced that O'Donnell left the network and Craig Hutchison was announced as his replacement for 2013.

Lou Richards was part of the Sunday Footy Show until the end of 2008, when he left due to illness. However, they continue to pay tribute with "Lou's Handball", a segment where players from opposing teams are pitted against each other in a handball target practice, and "Lou's Showcase", which is a showcase of prizes given to special guests. The segment discontinued at the end of 2013 but returned in 2019.

There was controversy on The Sunday Footy Show on 12 August 2007 when former North Melbourne Football Club captain Wayne Carey responded to criticisms from Nathan Thompson by mocking Thompson's well-publicised bout with depression. In addition, on returning from a commercial break, he was heard to make references to "necking himself", to the apparent delight of other members of the Footy Show panel. Carey and the Nine Network were quick to issue an apology over the incident, although no mention was officially made of the "necking himself" comment.

In December 2016, it was announced that Tony Jones would return to hosting the show, replacing Hutchison, who moved to the Thursday night show following the departure of James Brayshaw. Additionally, Luke Ball, who replaced Crawford at the end of 2014, also left the show to take on the role of National Umpiring Director at the AFL on a permanent basis; he was replaced by Kane Cornes.

In 2019, it was announced that Sam Newman would be returning to the Sunday Footy Show. However, in June 2020, Newman announced that he had officially parted ways with Channel 9 despite making rare appearances on the show.

In September 2021, Billy Brownless announced his resignation from the Nine Network after 27 years with the network.

In August 2024, it was announced that Kane Cornes would join the Seven Network's broadcasting team for AFL football, resulting in his departure from the Sunday Footy Show. Cornes was replaced by Rory Sloane for the 2025 season.

== Presenters ==
- Max Walker (1993–1999)
- Garry Lyon (2000–2005)
- Tony Jones (2006–2008, 2017–)
- James Brayshaw (2009–2011)
- Simon O'Donnell (2012)
- Craig Hutchison (2013–2016)

== See also ==
- List of Australian television series
- List of longest-running Australian television series
- The Sunday Footy Show (rugby league)
