= Mark Burrows =

Australian television news presenter and journalist

- Born: Hobart, Tasmania, Australia
- Occupations: News presenter and journalist
- Years active: 1980–present
- Employer: Nine Network
- Television: Nine News
- Children: 2
- Awards: Logie Award Romanian revolution in 1989; Walkley Award Interlaken Canyon Disaster in 1999

Mark W. Burrows is an Australian television news presenter and journalist.

Burrows is currently the Friday and Saturday presenter for Nine News Sydney and a senior reporter for Nine News. He has been a journalist for the Nine Network for more than four decades.

== Career ==
Burrows spent almost six years as Nine’s United States correspondent, covering two US presidential elections, the Los Angeles riots and several major earthquakes. In 1996 he was Nine’s reporter at the Atlanta Olympics.

In 1997, Burrows was posted to Nine’s London bureau, where he covered the death of Princess Diana, and the Iraq War. He also made numerous trips to Majorca, Spain, reporting on fugitive businessman Christopher Skase.

In 2000, Burrows was part of Nine’s Sydney Olympics reporting team.

He led Nine’s coverage of the 2002 Bali bombings, with the network’s reporting earning both a Walkley Award and a Logie Award. He later reported on the Bali Nine drug arrests and the conviction of Schapelle Corby.

In June 2026, Burrows was appointed Friday and Saturday presenter for Nine News Sydney, replacing Georgie Gardner. He continues to serve as a senior reporter for Nine News.

== Personal life ==
=== Early life ===
Burrows was born and bred in Hobart, Tasmania, Australia. After three years at the University of Tasmania, he turned his back on a career in the law and joined Hobart's TVT6, where he covered the Franklin River dam controversy under the mentorship of journalist Hendrik Gout.

=== Family ===
Burrows is married and has two sons.

One is named Alex Burrows the other is anonymous

== Awards ==
Burrows has won many awards while working for decades as a journalist.

Year	Award	News coverage
1989	Logie Award	Romanian revolution
1999	Walkley Award	Interlaken Canyon disaster
