= Mathew Thompson =

Australian rugby league commentator

Mathew Thompson (born 25 February 1982) is an Australian rugby league and swimming commentator for the Nine Network. Thompson is the number 1 caller for the Nine Network. He was previously calling Queensland Cup games alongside former Penrith Panthers player Scott Sattler and Brisbane based broadcaster Peter Psaltis. He regularly commentates NRL matches.

== Career ==
Prior to Nine, Thompson was best known as a commentator and host for Fox Sports, a journalist and broadcaster with Sydney radio stations 2GB and 2UE and presenter and producer with Sky News Australia.

In 2022, Thompson succeeded Ray Warren as the Nine Network's chief rugby league and swimming caller. Thompson called his first NRL Grand Final in 2022 as well as his first State of Origin series, and also regularly calls swimming events for the Nine Network, including at the 2024 Summer Olympics.

== Personal life ==
Thompson was born in Sydney and grew up in the Penrith district in New South Wales. He has two children.
