= Nick McArdle =

Australian television presenter

Nick McArdle is an Australian TV sports presenter with a career spanning 20 years in the media industry.

He currently hosts Wide World of Sports on the Nine Network and is a commentator. Prior to this, he spent several years as the weekend sports presenter for Seven News in Sydney.

== Career ==
Nick McArdle began his career in country television in Port Pirie, South Australia, before moving into radio with the Austereo Network reading news in Adelaide, Brisbane and Sydney . He transitioned to television in 1995, presenting the sport report on the now‑defunct Seven Late News and serving as a fill‑in presenter on Sunrise. Over the summer of 2005, he also presented Seven Morning News in a fill‑in capacity.

During his time with the Seven Network, McArdle covered major international sporting events including the Sydney and Athens Olympic Games, the Turin Winter Olympics, and the Commonwealth Games in Manchester and Melbourne. He was a regular on Australia's overseas cricket tours, including the 2001 Ashes and the 2003 Cricket World Cup. His reporting also extended to the 1999 World Alpine Ski Championships in Vail, the 2006 Davis Cup semi‑final in Buenos Aires, the World Athletics Championships in Seville, the World Swimming Championships in Barcelona, and the Pan Pacific Swimming Championships in Fukuoka. He left the Seven Network in November 2006.

McArdle joined Fox Sports shortly afterwards, working there until 2020 as a senior news presenter and host across tennis, cricket and rugby. He hosted Fox Sports' coverage of the US Open from Flushing Meadows and fronted in‑studio coverage of Australia's overseas cricket tours, beginning with the 2008 tour of India. He hosted the first two Tests of the 2009 Ashes series alongside former Australian cricketers Mark Waugh and Damien Fleming before travelling to England to host the remaining three Tests and report for Fox Sports News. He also anchored Fox Sports' rugby coverage until the end of 2019, when he was made redundant due to budget cuts. His rugby reporting was described by Malcolm Knox as "knowledgeable, calm, even‑handed".

In 2020, McArdle launched the podcast The Playmakers' Playbook. Later that year, he joined the Nine Network as part of its rugby broadcasting team.

McArdle also works as a public speaker.
