= Tim Gilbert (journalist) =

Australian journalist

- Born: 30 October 1967 (age 59)
- Occupations: Journalist, sport presenter
- Years active: 1996−present
- Employer: Sky News Australia
- Spouse: Josie Gilbert
- Relatives: Kieran Gilbert (brother)

Tim Gilbert (born 29 October 1967) is an Australian journalist. He also is a radio and TV personality. He is currently employed by Sky News Australia after a lengthy career with the Nine Network.

== Career ==
Gilbert's media career began at Radio 2GN in Goulburn and 2UE.

In 1996, he joined the Nine Network and since then has been a sport presenter, commentator, reporter and producer on the network. He has presented sport reports on Nine News and was also a reporter on The Cricket Show and The NRL Footy Show.

Gilbert has covered a number of sporting events both in Australia and around the world including the 2012 London Olympics and the 2010 Vancouver Winter Olympics.

In February 2009, Gilbert was appointed weekend sports presenter on Weekend Today.

In September 2014, Gilbert was announced as Ben Fordham's replacement on Today. He commenced his new role in November.

In January 2019, Tim announced that his last day with Today was 12 January 2019 after working with Nine Network for 22 years. Tony Jones was announced as his replacement.

Gilbert is now a presenter on Sky News Australia's show The Business of Sport.

== Personal life ==
At school, Gilbert attended Patrician Brothers' College, Fairfield, where he was part of the First XIII Rugby League and First XI Cricket teams.

Gilbert is married with children and is of Lebanese descent.

His brother is Sky News Australia presenter Kieran Gilbert.
