= Danika Mason =

Australian TV sports journalist

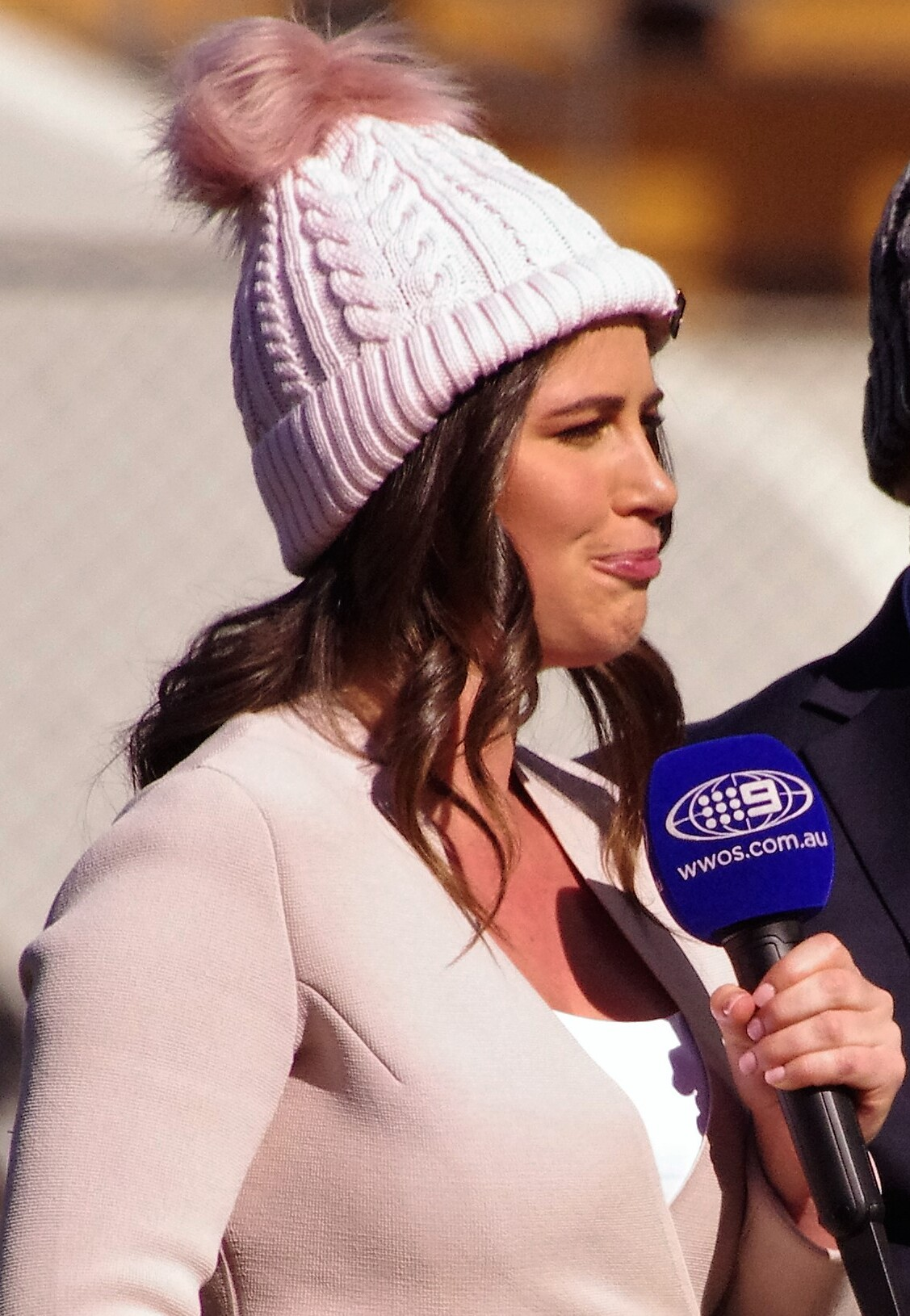
- Mason in 2019
- Born: 1991 (age 34–35)
- Occupations: Journalist, sports presenter
- Years active: 2012−present
- Employer: Nine Network
- Television: Today; Nine's Wide World of Sports
- Partner: Liam Knight

Danika Mason (born 1991) is an Australian television sports journalist.

== Career ==
Mason obtained journalism and marketing degrees at the University of Wollongong and in 2012 began her career at the Nine Network as an intern, shortly after which she was promoted to the sports department.

She appears regularly on the Nine Network's National Rugby League coverage as a sideline reporter on their Thursday and Friday night rugby league live broadcasts, as well as a host on The Sunday Footy Show, and as a roving reporter on their Australian Open tennis coverage.

In February 2025, Mason was announced as the new sports presenter on Today, after Alex Cullen was sacked by the Nine Network the previous month.

In February 2026, Mason appeared as a reporter on the Nine Network's coverage of the 2026 Winter Olympics. She issued a public apology for slurring her words and going off topic during the February 18 live broadcast to discuss the price of coffee in the United States, and iguanas, saying that she had misjudged the effect of having alcohol on an empty stomach beforehand.

In October 2026, Mason announced that she would leave Today ahead of maternity leave, citing the demands of balancing the role with her NRL commitments and impending parenthood. She stated that she would remain with the Nine Network's NRL coverage upon her return.

== Personal life ==
Mason has been in a relationship with rugby league player Liam Knight since 2024. The couple announced their engagement in October 2025.

On 1 July 2026, Mason announced on Today that they were expecting their first child.
