= James Bracey (sports presenter) =

Australian television sports presenter

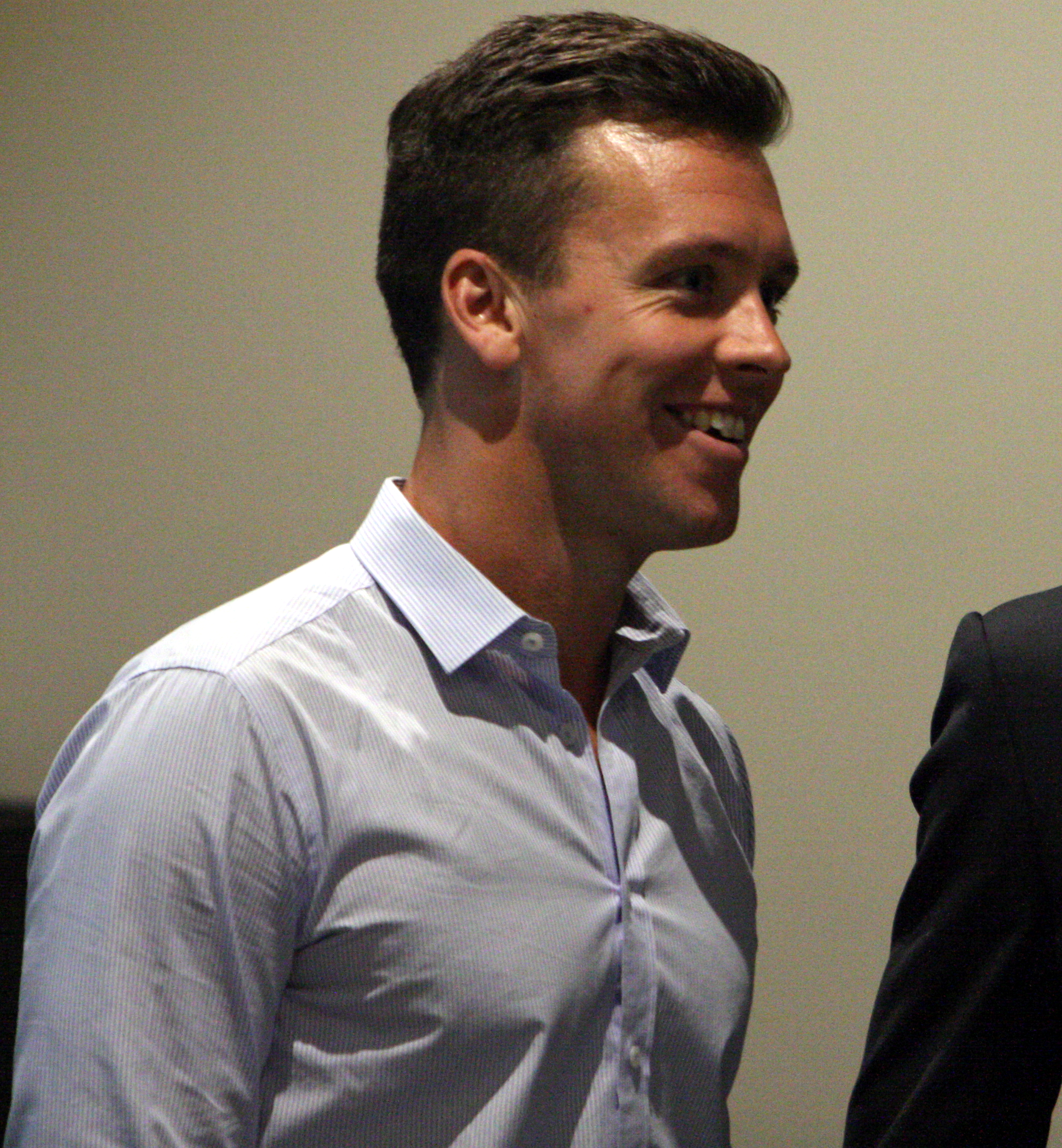
- Bracey c. 2017
- Born: 17 September 1984 (age 42); Newcastle, New South Wales, Australia
- Education: University of Newcastle
- Occupation: TV presenter
- Years active: 2008−present
- Employer: Nine Network
- Known for: Nine News Sydney sports presenter

James Bracey (born 17 September 1984) is an Australian television sports presenter.

Bracey currently presents sport on Nine News Sydney from Sunday to Thursday. He also serves as the Nine Network’s chief NRL host and is the primetime anchor for the Australian Open tennis coverage.

== Career ==
Bracey began his television career as a sports reporter and presenter at Sky News Australia where he commenced working following his graduation from the University of Newcastle in 2005. From January 2013 to December 2016, he hosted SportsNight with James Bracey on the network.

He then joined the Nine Network and has since anchored much of its sports coverage – including the National Rugby League (Premiership rounds, State of Origins and Grand Finals), the Australian Open and the Presidents Cup.

Bracey has also hosted Sports Sunday (2018–2022) and 100% Footy (since 2018). He also filled in for Erin Molan as host of The Footy Show during her maternity leave in 2018.

With the announcement that Bracey would be replacing Cameron Williams as sports presenter on Nine News, it was also announced he would be stepping down as host of Sports Sunday to make way for new host Roz Kelly who was also named as the sports presenter for the Friday and Saturday editions of Nine News.

Bracey, alongside Allison Langdon, was named as Nine's primetime host for the 2024 Paris Olympics games.

He has also filled in for Karl Stefanovic on Today.

== Controversies ==
While working at Sky News Australia, Bracey was accused of making an inappropriate gesture about Jim Wilson when it appeared he was mimicking oral sex when a studio shot of him was accidentally put to air while Wilson was talking during a live cross on Sportsline. Sky News director of news and programming Ian Ferguson said he wanted to "correct misinformation" which had circulated on social media following the mishap and confirmed Bracey was coughing. Wilson, guest Jimmy Smith and sports editor Paul Gregg all confirmed Bracey had been coughing uncontrollably when he unexpectedly appeared on screen and was not making a rude gesture about Wilson.

== Personal life ==
Bracey is a supporter of rugby league club the North Sydney Bears, he was named as the club’s number one ticket holder for the 2018 season.

Bracey has a daughter Tilly who has type 1 diabetes diagnosed at age 2. She appeared in The Today Show on 30/01/2026 talking about living with type 1 diabetes and shining a light on the chronic condition.

== See also ==
- List of Nine Network presenters

Media offices
Preceded by Cameron Williams	Nine News Sydney; Sport presenter (Sunday to Thursday); March 2022 – present	Succeeded by Incumbent
Preceded by Originator	100% Footy; Host; 2018–present	Succeeded by Incumbent
Preceded by Emma Freedman	Sports Sunday; Host; 2018–2021	Succeeded by Roz Kelly
