= Give Us This Day (Australian TV program) =

- Genre: Religious broadcasting
- Presented by: Various
- Country of origin: Australia
- Original language: English

Production
- Running time: 6 minutes

Original release
- Network: TCN-9
- Release: 29 October 1956 – 1958

Give Us This Day is an Australian religious television short program aired from 1956 to 1958 on TCN-9. It is significant as one of the very earliest Australian-produced television programs. It was among the television shows aired during the first "official" week of television in Sydney. Give Us This Day was a live six-minute religious program in which a minister gave a short speech, with ministers from different Christian denominations appearing during the show's run. There was no recurring cast. It was based on a British format.

While largely forgotten today, it actually out-lived three 1956 TCN series debuts that are more commonly mentioned in television retrospectives – The Johnny O'Connor Show, Campfire Favourites and Accent on Strings. TCN-9's other 1956 series debuts included Fun Farm (1956–1957), The Home Show (1956–1957) and What's My Line (1956–1958).
