= Club Seven (Australian TV series) =

- Genre: Variety
- Presented by: Terry Scanlon; Frank Wilson
- Country of origin: Australia
- Original language: English

Original release
- Network: HSV-7
- Release: 1959 – 1961

Club Seven is an Australian television variety series which aired from 1959 to 1961. It aired on Melbourne station HSV-7, broadcast live at 10:00PM on Thursdays. Hosts of the series included Terry Scanlon and Frank Wilson. The series faced competition from GTV-9's In Melbourne Tonight. At least part of an episode is known to exist and is available for viewing on YouTube.

== Night-club setting ==
In the 20 August 1959 edition of The Age newspaper, a writer for the newspaper said that the series was unsuccessful in recreating the night-club atmosphere, and said the Sydney-produced ABC series Cafe Continental was more successful at creating such an atmosphere. In fact, the use of such a setting was a somewhat common one on early television, having also been used by the 1957-1959 HSV-7 series The Late Show, which was the predecessor of Club Seven. Rendezvous at Romano's (1957, TCN-9) may have also featured such a setting. Additionally, the setting (or a similar restaurant cabaret setting) was also used by American series The Morey Amsterdam Show (1948–1950), The Ilona Massey Show (1954–1955, DuMont), Hold That Camera (1950, DuMont), Café de Paris (1949, DuMont), and the unrelated series Club Seven (1948–1951, ABC). Additionally, British series Café Continental (1947–1953, BBC) used such a setting, as did early Canadian series Nightcap.
