= Accent on Strings =

- Genre: Music television
- Country of origin: Australia
- Original language: English
- No. of seasons: 1

Production
- Production location: Willoughby, New South Wales

Original release
- Network: TCN-9
- Release: 27 October 1956 – January 1957

Accent on Strings is an Australian television series which aired in 1956 on Sydney station TCN-9. A music series, the first episode aired October 27, 1956. It was among several early locally produced series which debuted during the first official week of programming by the station, along with The Johnny O'Connor Show, game show What's My Line, religious series Give Us This Day, children's series Fun Farm, and music series Campfire Favourites, with these series having varying degrees of success.

Accent on Strings proved to be among the less successful of early TCN-9 offerings, running a couple months, and ending at the same time as Campfire Favourites and The Johnny O'Connor Show.

Three of the episodes exist as kinescope recordings at the National Film and Sound Archive. There is very little information about this series available online.

== See also ==
- List of Australian music television shows
