= Guest of the Week =

- Also known as: Guest of Week
- Presented by: Mary Parker
- Country of origin: Australia
- Original language: English

Production
- Running time: 15 minutes

Original release
- Network: HSV-7
- Release: 18 November 1956 – November 1957

Guest of the Week (also listed in newspaper listings as Guest of Week) is an early Australian television series which aired from 1956 to 1957 on Melbourne station HSV-7. Little information is available on the series. Hosted by Mary Parker, the series debuted on 18 November 1956 and ended about a year later during November 1957. It was a 15-minute series aired at 7:15PM on Saturdays, following HSV-7's newscast, which itself was 15-minutes at the time. On other days of the week, the station filled the 15-minutes after the newscasts with programmes ranging from American imports like The Patti Page Show to locally produced series like The Isador Goodman Show. This was similar to practices in the US during the 1950s, in which newscasts were followed by series like The Dinah Shore Show.

The archival status of the series is unknown, although given station practices of the era it is unlikely (though not impossible) that any of the episodes were kinescoped.

Mary Parker was also host or co-host of two other HSV-7 programs, Eric and Mary (with Eric Pearce), and Beauty is My Business.
