= Eunice Gardiner Presents =

- Genre: Music television
- Presented by: Eunice Gardiner
- Country of origin: Australia
- Original language: English

Production
- Production location: Willoughby, New South Wales
- Running time: 30 minutes

Original release
- Network: TCN-9
- Release: 1958 – 1958

Eunice Gardiner Presents is an Australian television series which aired in 1958 on Sydney station TCN-9. The series starred pianist Eunice Gardiner, who on the series played the piano and interviewed personalities in music. The series aired on Sundays, broadcast in a 30-minute time-slot at 5:30PM. The series proved short-lived, and was eventually replaced on the schedule with Music for You. Like most Australian series of the 1950s, it aired in a single city only.

The series aired live, and it is not known if any kinescope recordings exist of the series. "Kinescope recording", also known as telerecording, was an early method of recording live and as-live television, used in the days before video-tape was widely available.
