= Beauty is My Business =

- Presented by: Mary Parker
- Country of origin: Australia
- Original language: English

Production
- Running time: 15 minutes

Original release
- Network: HSV-7
- Release: 27 September 1957 – 3 January 1958

Beauty is My Business is an early Australian television series for which very little information is available, but which represents an early example of television content produced in that country. It was a weekly series which ran on Fridays, from 27 September 1957 to 3 January 1958, aired in a 15-minute time-slot, and like most early Australian television series it aired in a single city only. In this case, it aired on Melbourne station HSV-7. Mary Parker, who was a newsreader at HSV-7, was the host of the series.

In some old TV listings it is listed as being the last show on HSV-7's schedule for Friday, as during 1957 HSV signed off each night some time before midnight. Television in Australia (and many other countries) was not yet a 24-hour service.

Mary Parker was also a regular on Eric and Mary and Guest of the Week.
