= Joe Martin's Late Show =

- Genre: Variety
- Presented by: Joe Martin
- Country of origin: Australia
- Original language: English

Production
- Production location: TCN-9 Willoughby, New South Wales

Original release
- Network: Nine Network
- Release: 1959

Joe Martin's Late Show is an Australian television series that aired in early 1959 on TCN-9. The short-lived series was a variety show with music and comedy. Regulars on the series included Joe Martin, Babs McKinnon, Marie Tysoe, Isador Goodman, William Palmer, and Alec Kellaway.

== Reception ==
The Australian Women's Weekly called it "smooth and well produced, but Martin, who really is a funny man, seemed to be rather inhibited by the demands and structures of TV" and that "old trouper Alec Kellaway and that young one Roger Climpson stole the show from him completely whenever they appeared".
