= The Johnny O'Connor Show =

Australian television series

- Genre: Variety
- Country of origin: Australia
- Original language: English

Production
- Production location: Willoughby, New South Wales
- Running time: 15 minutes

Original release
- Network: TCN-9
- Release: 28 October 1956 – January 1957

The Johnny O'Connor Show is an early Australian television series which aired on Sydney station TCN-9. The first episode aired 28 October 1956. The quarter-hour variety series proved to be short-lived, running just a couple months. Performers on the series included pianist Glen Marks and Toni Lamond.

It ended at around the same time as two other early TCN productions, Accent on Strings and Campfire Favourites, being outlived by other 1956 TCN debuts such as Fun Farm, What's My Line and Give us this Day. The early offerings by the station had varying degrees of success, reflecting how new television was to Australia.

Notable as one of the first Australian television series, information on this series is very scarce, and it is not known if any kinescope recordings exist of it.

The series similar to the US music show The Patti Page Show, proved that live shows where expensive in production costs
