= At Seven on 7 =

- Presented by: Howard Craven
- Country of origin: Australia
- Original language: English
- No. of seasons: 1

Production
- Production locations: Sydney, New South Wales

Original release
- Network: ATN-7
- Release: 3 December 1956 – February 1957

At Seven on 7 is an early Australian television series, which aired from 3 December 1956 to circa 22 February 1957 on Sydney station ATN-7. Along with series like What's My Line, The Judy Jack Show and The Isador Goodman Show, it represented an early example at Australian-produced television content.

Early Australian series typically aired in a single city, which was also the case with At Seven on 7.

The live, half-hour series consisted of Howard Craven interviewing personalities.

The aired each weeknight at 7:00 p.m., meaning the series that followed and preceded it varied. For example, on Tuesdays the series was preceded on ATN's schedule by U.S. series Superman and followed by U.S. comedy series The George Burns and Gracie Allen Show, while on Fridays it was preceded by U.S. adventure series Ramar of the Jungle and followed by UK adventure series The Adventures of Sir Lancelot.

Archival status is unknown. As the program was only broadcast in a single city it is possible it was never kinescoped, though this is not confirmed (note: "kinescope recording" was an early method used to record live television).
