= The World of Glamour =

- Genre: Fashion
- Presented by: Elaine White
- Country of origin: Australia
- Original language: English

Production
- Production location: TCN-9 Willoughby, New South Wales
- Running time: 27 minutes

Original release
- Network: Nine Network
- Release: 1964 – 1965

The World of Glamour was an Australian television series which aired from 1964 to 1965 on Sydney station TCN-9. Hosted by Elaine White, the series revolved around about fashion and beauty. Based on some airing times, it was likely in a time-slot around 27 minutes long. It is not known if any of the episodes have been preserved, given the common practice of wiping during the era in which it aired.

== See also ==
- Beauty Case - 1958 series with Elaine White
