= Paul Fitzgerald (painter) =

Paul Fitzgerald AM
- Born: Paul Desmond Fitzgerald; 1 August 1922; Hawthorn, Victoria
- Died: 24 June 2017 (aged 94); Kew, Victoria
- Education: National Gallery of Victoria Art School
- Occupation: Portrait artist
- Military career
- Allegiance: Australia
- Branch: Australian Army
- Service years: 1943–1946
- Rank: Sergeant
- Service number: VX126647
- Unit: 5 Machine Gun Battalion

Paul Desmond Fitzgerald AM (1 August 1922 – 24 June 2017) was an Australian portrait painter of prominent and celebrated individuals.

== Background ==
Fitzgerald was born in the family home, in the Melbourne suburb of Kew, the second son of Frank Fitzgerald and Margaret née Poynton. Frank Fitzgerald was a journalist with The Age for approximately ten years and about eight years with The Argus. He periodically filled the roles of general reporting, leader writing, political correspondent, art critic, music critic, theatre critic and motoring editor.

A Catholic, Fitzgerald was educated at Xavier College in Melbourne (1933–1939) and studied for five years at the National Gallery School (1940–43 and 1946–47), interrupted for three and a half years in the Army during World War II (1943–46).

== Professional career ==
When he was painting away from his studio in Melbourne, he usually lived with the subjects of his portraiture. He lived and painted overseas on commissioned portraits twice each year since 1958 including America, Canada, England, Scotland, Ireland, Jersey, France, Italy, Germany, Spain, Malaysia, Singapore, Hong Kong, Hawaii and Bermuda. He also painted throughout Australia.

Fitzgerald was a finalist for the Archibald Prize for portraiture on multiple occasions including 1958 (with a portrait of Justice Robert Monahan), in 1962 (with portraits of each of Sir Reg Ansett and Sir Robert Menzies), and in 1972 (with a portrait of Sir Henry Bolte).

In 1997 Fitzgerald was appointed a Member of the Order of Australia and a Knight of Malta. He founded the Australian Guild of Realist Artists, where he was a life member of the council, and was president for seven years. Fitzgerald was a member of "Portraits Incorporated" in America, is a trustee of the A.M.E. Bale Travelling Scholarship and Art Prize, and produced the art book Australian Realist and Impressionist Artists, donating the profits to charity.

=== Known works ===
Fitzgerald's work was prolific and the following are known notable portraits by the artist:

- Queen Elizabeth II in 1963, in 1978 being the only official portrait in her Silver Jubilee year, and one other portrait in 1967.
- Prince Philip, Duke of Edinburgh in 1976, plus one other portrait in 1974.
- Charles, Prince of Wales, two portraits, 1978.
- Pope John XXIII painted in The Vatican in 1963.
- The Duke of Kent, two portraits, in 1978 and 2000.
- Sir William Heseltine, Private Secretary to Queen Elizabeth II.
- Five portraits of the Malaysian Royal Family
- Two identical 6 feet (1.8 m) portraits of Sharafuddin Idris Shah; The Raja Muda of Selangor (Crown Prince of Malaysia), son of the Sultan of Selangor
- Maximilian, Margrave of Baden and his family
- Three cardinals, including Cardinal James Knox, four archbishops, including Daniel Mannix, and two bishops
- Angelo de Mojana di Cologna – 77th Prince Grand Master of the Knights of Malta and Count Da Larocca – Knight of Malta
- The Duke of Westminster; a marquess; three earls; two viscounts; four barons
- Two governors-general of Australia, two Australian prime ministers, including Sir Robert Menzies and Malcolm Fraser, six Australian state governors, two Australian state premiers, including Sir Henry Bolte
- Fourteen Supreme Court judges, including portraits of the ten judges of the Supreme Court of Victoria between 1964 and 1965 (who were Sir Edmund Herring, Sir Charles Lowe, Sir Norman O'Bryan, Sir Arthur Dean, Sir Reginald Sholl, Thomas W. Smith, Sir Edward Hudson, Sir Robert Monahan, Sir Douglas Little, and Sir Alistair Adam) and six Chiefs of Air Staff
- Two presidents of the Australian Colleges of Surgeons, three of the College of Physicians: one the College of Anaesthetics and three of the College of Obstetrics and Gynaecology; two presidents of the English Royal College of Obstetrics and Gynaecology
- Three university chancellors; twelve college principals
- Three presidents of the Melbourne Cricket Club; seven presidents of the Victorian Football League and three chief executives; two presidents the Australian Football League
- Five presidents of the board of governors of the New York Hospital; the executive director of the New York Hospital
- World chairman of Citibank (who was also president of the New York Metropolitan Opera), Conrad Hilton (Hilton Hotels), Glenn Ford (actor), Vivien Leigh (actor), Maria Callas (soprano; posthumously)
- Two Australian motor racing champions
- Sporting champions including Sir Norman Brookes (post.), Lew Hoad, Neale Fraser, Allan Border, John Nichols, Lionel Rose
- S. Baillieu Myer
- Roslyn Packer, Gretel Packer & James Packer
- Reg Ansett
- Peter Janson
- Hector Crawford
- Vivien Leigh
- Bruno and Reno Grollo
- Hon. Tom Hughes AO KC – Australian attorney-general
- The first three Racehorses of the Year for Victorian Racing Commission – Rain Lover, Gay Icarus, Vain
- 14 portraits of the Vestey Family
- Portraits of Lord Trout, Roy Trout (1974), and Jane Nathan (1958)
- George Mochrie, 1970, Melbourne Businessman

=== Personal life ===
Shortly after returning to Australia in 1957, Fitzgerald married Mary Parker, who was born in Bitton, Gloucestershire and, as a child, had emigrated with her family to Melbourne. Parker's brother, Lieutenant–Commander Michael Parker, was a former private secretary to Prince Philip. Mary Parker attended Genezzano Convent then returned to England and established a successful career as a film actress and television announcer. She returned to Australia with HSV-7 in 1956 to cover the television coverage of the Melbourne Olympic Games and is considered to be the first woman on Australian television, having appeared in their test broadcasts and as a newsreader on their opening night, alongside Eric Pearce (later Sir Eric). Mary and Paul Fitzgerald had seven children; Fabian (born 1959), Marisa (born 1960), Patrick (born 1963, since deceased), Emma (born 1964), Edward (born 1968), Maria (born 1970) and Frances (born 1973).

Fitzgerald's hobbies included tennis, music and reading; and he was a member of the Melbourne Club, Victorian Racing Club and Royal South Yarra Lawn Tennis Club.
