= The Lucky Show =

Australian television series which aired from 1959 to 1961

- Genre: Game show; Variety
- Presented by: George Foster
- Country of origin: Australia
- Original language: English

Production
- Production location: TCN-9 Willoughby, New South Wales
- Running time: 60 minutes

Original release
- Network: Nine Network
- Release: 13 May 1959 – 1961

The Lucky Show was an Australian television series which aired from 1959 to 1961 on Sydney station TCN-9. Chuck Faulkner was originally announced as host, but was replaced prior to the first broadcast with George Foster. The series was a mix of game show and variety show, and episodes aired in a 60-minute time-slot during daytime. In 1961, The Lucky Show and The Happy Show were merged to create Happy Go Lucky, which should not be confused with Melbourne series The Happy Go Lucky Show (1957-1959). It is not known if any kinescopes or video-tapes still exist of The Lucky Show.
