= The N.R.M.A Show =

- Also known as: The Open Road
- Genre: Motoring
- Presented by: Bruce Beeby
- Country of origin: Australia
- Original language: English

Production
- Production location: TCN-9 Willoughby, New South Wales

Original release
- Network: Nine Network
- Release: 30 June – 17 November 1957

The N.R.M.A. Show, also known as The Open Road, is an early Australian television series which aired on Sydney station TCN-9 in 1957, from 30 June to 17 November. The series was promoted as "designed to provide the average car owner with hints and help to make the most out of motoring". Compered by Bruce Beeby, the series aired on Sundays at 5:30PM. Little information is available on this series.
