= What a Year =

- Starring: 2007 Hosts; Bert Newton; Julia Zemiro; 2006 Hosts; Mike Munro; Megan Gale
- Country of origin: Australia
- No. of episodes: 11 (5 unaired)

Production
- Running time: 60 minutes (including commercials)

Original release
- Network: Nine Network
- Release: 2 October 2006 – 6 August 2007

What a Year was an Australian television documentary series, hosted by former ACA host Mike Munro and supermodel Megan Gale in 2006 and Bert Newton and Julia Zemiro in 2007. What a Year looked at the news, events, sporting achievements, entertainment and fads of a selected year in each episode. The hosts spoke to people who witnessed and experienced the particular events first-hand.

== History ==
Mike Munro and Megan Gale presented the 2006 series. They successfully hosted nine episodes and it attracted a lot of viewers. In 2007, Gale and Munro's show contracts expired, so Newton and Zemiro replaced them as presenters. However, it was cancelled by the Nine Network after coming last place in the nightly ratings on 6 August 2007 due to the big win for Channel Seven..

In a November issue of a TV Week magazine in 2007, Munro claimed he and Gale left the show because the programmers wanted to lighten up the show and make it more fun. Munro explained that he disliked wearing fashionable clothes for that era. But Newton loved wearing them, so he was hired instead of Munro.

The episodes that remained unaired after the show's axing were broadcast by Channel Nine over the summer non-ratings period, beginning the unaired episodes on 27 December 2007. The new episodes replaced plans to screen repeats of Australian travel series, Things To Try Before You Die.

During March 2011, the Nine Network replayed the 1980 and 1999 themed episodes, on a Wednesday night at 7:30pm on their HD digital multi channel GEM after being abruptly cancelled and replaced with filler shows.

== After "What A Year" ==
1. Gale continued her modelling career and has also done some acting.
2. Munro hosted Missing Persons Unit from 2006 to 2008 and is now working on Sunday Night for Channel Seven.
3. Newton hosted 20 to 1 from 2006 to 2011.
4. Zemiro went to host RocKwiz on SBS.

== List of episodes ==
=== 2006 ===
1. What a Year – 1975 – 2 October 2006
2. What a Year – 1983 – 9 October 2006
3. What a Year – 1997 – 16 October 2006
4. What a Year – 1969 – 23 October 2006
5. What a Year – 1986 – 30 October 2006
6. What a Year – 2001 – 6 November 2006
7. What a Year – 1991 – 13 November 2006
8. What a Year – 1977 – 20 November 2006
9. What a Year – 1989 – 27 November 2006

=== 2007 ===
1. What a Year – 1980 – 30 July 2007
2. What a Year – 1999 – 6 August 2007
3. What a Year – 1976
4. What a Year – 1994
5. What a Year – 2002
6. What a Year – 1988
