= TV Bingo =

- Genre: Game show
- Presented by: David Paterson
- Country of origin: Australia
- Original language: English

Original release
- Network: TCN-9
- Release: 27 September – 17 November 1965

TV Bingo is an Australian television series of 1965. Aired in Sydney only on station TCN-9, it was a half-hour game show in which viewers at home played bingo for prizes. It was hosted by David Paterson, and aired in a daytime time-slot.

== Controversy ==
The legality of the series was questioned, given that the prizes given exceeded the legal limits for bingo games, additionally the series was blamed for causing a decline in the takings by charitable bingo games. Eventually TCN-9 agreed to cease broadcasting the series, while ATN-7, which had introduced a similar show, suspended their series after three episodes. A similar programme airing in Newcastle was also suspended.
