= Financial Review Sunday =

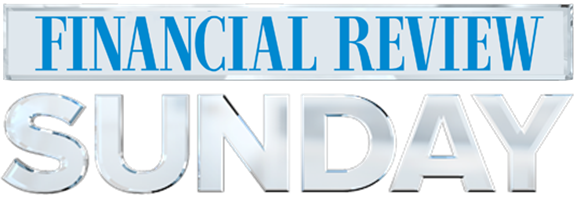
- Financial Review Sunday logo
- Genre: Business, Finance
- Directed by: Bryan Newton
- Presented by: Deborah Knight
- Country of origin: Australia
- Original language: English
- No. of seasons: 2
- No. of episodes: 36

Production
- Executive producer: Mark Calvert
- Producers: Brad Hodson; Matt Etheridge; Nabila Ahmed
- Production location: TCN-9 Willoughby, New South Wales
- Running time: 30 minutes

Original release
- Network: Nine Network
- Release: 5 May 2013 – 30 November 2014

Financial Review Sunday was an Australian business news television program produced by the Nine Network, in partnership with Fairfax Media. It aired on the Nine Network at 10:00am after Weekend Today and was hosted by Deborah Knight. The show premiered on 5 May 2013 and is sponsored by Westpac and CPA Australia.

Eddy Meyer was a reporter for the show and various journalists from the Australian Financial Review also contribute stories and interviews. Joe Aston featured as the Rear Window segment presenter.

Nine News reporter Jayne Azzopardi was a fill in presenter.

In March 2015, Nine Network announced that the program is cancelled.
