= Town Talk (TV series) =

- Also known as: T.V. Town Talk
- Presented by: Robert Kennedy
- Country of origin: Australia
- Original language: English

Production
- Production location: TCN-9 Willoughby, New South Wales

Original release
- Network: Nine Network
- Release: May 1957 – December 1957

Town Talk, originally T.V. Town Talk, was an Australian television series which aired on Sydney station TCN-9 during 1957, from circa May to December. Little information is available on this series. The series was hosted by early Australian television personality Robert Kennedy, who had been the original host of the Sydney version of What's My Line. Town Talk aired at 7:15PM on Fridays, following the evening news, which itself aired in a 15-minute time-slot during 1957.
