= Say It with Music =

Say It with Music may refer to:

- Say It with Music (1929 film), a Swedish musical film
- Say It with Music (1932 film), a British musical drama film
- Say It with Music (song), a 1921 popular song
- Say It with Music (1957 TV series), which aired 1957–1958 on TCN-9
- Say It with Music (1967 TV series), which aired 1967–1969 on the 0/10 Network

== See also ==
- Say It with Music (A Touch of Latin), an album by Ray Conniff
