= Desmond and the Channel 9-Pins =

Australian television series

- Genre: Children's
- Presented by: Desmond Tester; Cherrie Butlin
- Country of origin: Australia
- Original language: English

Original release
- Network: TCN-9
- Release: 1957 – 1962

Desmond and the Channel 9-Pins is an Australian television series which aired from 1957 to 1962 on Sydney station TCN-9. Compered by Desmond Tester, it was a children's series. In 1961, Tester retired from appearing on-screen on the series, but continued to write, producer and direct the show. His hosting job was taken over by Cherrie Butlin.

The series replaced Fun Farm on TCN-9's schedule.

It is not known how many episodes still exist, given the wiping of the era. Two episodes, one from 1958 and the other from 1960, are held by National Film and Sound Archive
