= Counterpoints (TV series) =

- Genre: Lifestyle
- Presented by: Norma Martyn; Pamela Page
- Country of origin: Australia
- Original language: English

Production
- Production location: Willoughby, New South Wales

Original release
- Network: TCN-9
- Release: 29 August 1958 – 1958

Counterpoints is an Australian television series which aired in 1958 on Sydney station TCN-9, debuting circa 29 August of that year. The series featured Norma Martyn and Pamela Page, and featured comment and gossip on what women were doing, buying and wearing in Sydney, Australia. It represents an early example of a Sydney-produced lifestyle-themed television series. At the time most Australian series aired in a single city only, which was also the case with Counterpoints. It is not known if any of the episodes exist as kinescope recordings, the method used to record live and as-live TV in the days before Australian stations had video-tape.
