= Happy Go Lucky (TV program) =

Australian television series

- Genre: Variety show; Game show
- Presented by: George Foster; Walter Elliott
- Country of origin: Australia
- Original language: English

Production
- Running time: 30 minutes

Original release
- Network: TCN-9; HSV-7
- Release: 1961

Happy Go Lucky is an Australian television series which aired in 1961. Produced by Sydney station TCN-9, it also aired on Melbourne station HSV-7, as the two stations had an agreement to share programming with each other in the days before the Nine Network and Seven Network were formed. The combined two previous series, The Lucky Show and The Happy Show.

The series was a mix of variety show and game show, aired in a 30-minute daytime time-slot, and featured George Foster, Walter Elliott and Elizabeth Waterhouse.
