= Say It with Music (1957 TV series) =

- Genre: Variety
- Presented by: Frank Lawrence; Marie Lawrence
- Country of origin: Australia
- Original language: English

Production
- Production location: TCN-9 Willoughby, New South Wales
- Running time: 30 minutes

Original release
- Network: Nine Network
- Release: 21 February 1957 – 15 April 1958

Say It with Music was an early Australian television series. It aired on Sydney station TCN-9 from 21 February 1957 to 15 April 1958. Hosted by pianist Frank Lawrence and his wife, Marie Lawrence, the series was a variety show.

The half-hour series featured entertainers such as singers, dancers, instrumentalists, and jugglers and was intended for "late evening relaxation".

It is not known if any of the episodes are still extant as kinescope recordings.
