= The Hostage (1956 film) =

1956 British film by Harold Huth

- Danish theatrical poster
- Directed by: Harold Huth
- Written by: Alfred Shaughnessy
- Produced by: Thomas Clyde
- Starring: Ron Randell; Mary Parker; John Bailey
- Cinematography: Brendan J. Stafford
- Edited by: Peter Pitt
- Music by: Bretton Byrd
- Production companies: Douglas Fairbanks Jr. & Company; Westridge
- Distributed by: Eros Films
- Release date: December 1956
- Running time: 80 minutes
- Country: United Kingdom
- Language: English

The Hostage is a 1956 British crime film directed by Harold Huth and starring Ron Randell, Mary Parker and John Bailey. It was written by Alfred Shaughnessy.

== Plot ==
When Dr. Pablo Gonzuelo, President of Santanio, condemns the revolutionary Vorgler to death, a group of South American revolutionaries in London kidnap the President's daughter Rosa, along with American pilot Bill Trainer. When Vorgler is executed, the revolutionaries are ready to murder Rosa and Trainer, but they are rescued in time.

== Production ==
The film was made at New Elstree Studios. The film's sets were designed by the art director Harry White.

== Cast ==
- Ron Randell as Bill Trailer
- Mary Parker as Rosa Gonzuelo
- John Bailey as Dr Main
- Carl Jaffe as Dr Pablo Gonzuelo
- Anne Blake as Mrs Steen
- Cyril Luckham as Hugh Ferguson
- Margaret Diamond as Madame Gonzuelo
- Victor Brooks as Inspector Clifford
- James Liggat as Sergeant Reid
- Robert Marsden as Benda
- John Rutland as Jim Barnes
- Everley Gregg as Mrs Barnes
- John Phillips as workman

== Critical reception ==
The Monthly Film Bulletin wrote: "The absurdities of this improbable thriller are somewhat softened by a well-written script, general technical efficiency and some competent acting (notably by Margaret Diamond). London backgrounds are unobtrusively but quite effectively used."

Kine Weekly said "The picture spends most of its time in London, but the authentic exteriors, loosely pieced together, fail to lend credibility to the penny blood tale. Ron Randell has his moments as Bill and Carl Jaffe makes a dignified president, but Mary Parker lacks experience as Rosa. The supporting cast is indifferent, while the handling of the fights, the fire sequence and the lurid climax leave much to be desired. And what was MI5 doing during all this?"

Picture Show called the film: "A well-photographed political melodrama."

In British Sound Films: The Studio Years 1928–1959 David Quinlan rated the film as "mediocre", writing: "Laughably plotted thriller."

Leslie Halliwell said: "Tolerable support."
