= Music for You =

- Genre: Music television
- Starring: Isador Goodman
- Country of origin: Australia
- Original language: English

Original release
- Network: TCN-9
- Release: 1958 – 1960

Music for You was an Australian television series. Little information is available on the series. It aired from 1958 to 1960 on Sydney station TCN-9, and starred pianist Isador Goodman. Aired on Sundays, the time-slot varied. In September 1958 the series aired at 4:30PM while by May 1960 it aired at 1:30PM. It was Goodman's second television series, following the 1956-57 Melbourne series The Isador Goodman Show. Well known in Australia at the time, he was also heard on radio during the 1950s.

Given the main performer and the title, it was most likely a music series. Although kinescope recording and later video-tape was available during the run of the series, it is not known if any such recordings were made or still exist today.
