= You Lucky People! =

1955 film

You Lucky People
- DVD cover
- Directed by: Maurice Elvey
- Written by: Anthony Verney; Tommy Trinder
- Based on: Fifteen Days by Maurice Harrison; Sidney Nelson
- Produced by: David Dent
- Starring: Tommy Trinder; Mary Parker; Dora Bryan
- Cinematography: Gordon Dines
- Edited by: Robert Jordan Hill
- Music by: Edwin Astley
- Production company: Advance Productions
- Distributed by: Adelphi Films
- Release date: 18 July 1955
- Running time: 79 minutes
- Country: United Kingdom
- Language: English

You Lucky People! is a 1955 British comedy film directed by Maurice Elvey and starring Tommy Trinder, Mary Parker and Dora Bryan. Originally titled Get Fell In, the film was renamed to match Trinder's familiar catchphrase. It was shot in a rival French process to CinemaScope, called 'CameraScope', with the attendant publicity describing "the first feature to be made with an anamorphic lens in black and white! It's a camerascoop!". It was shot at Beaconsfield Studios near London with sets designed by the art director Ray Simm.

== Premise ==
An intake of civilian reservists arrive at army camp to do their two weeks refresher training.

== Cast ==
- Tommy Trinder as Tommy Smart
- Mary Parker as Private Sally Briggs
- Dora Bryan as Sergeant Hortense Tipp
- R.S.M. Brittain as Himself
- James Copeland as Private Jim Campbell
- Michael Kelly as Sergeant Manners
- Mark Singleton as Lieutenant Arthur Robson
- Charles Rolfe as Hooky
- Rolf Harris as Private Proudfoot
- Rufus Cruikshank as Sergeant Major Horace Thickpenny
- Michael Trubshawe as Lieutenant Colonel Barkstone-Gadsby
- Harold Goodwin as Private Rossiter
- Mignon O'Doherty as Colonel Trudgeon
- Derek Prentice as Cpl Jones
- Marcia Ashton as Pvt. Stubby Braithwaite
- Felix Felton as Sergeant Cook
- Patrick Jordan as Corporal
- Kenneth Kove as Old Soldier
- Norman Mitchell as Soldier

== Production ==
Filming started March 1955.

== Reception ==
TV Guide wrote, "other than an occasional laugh, it's hard to find much worth recommending in this farce on British army life"; while BFI Screenonline describes how the film did steady business on its release, with Kine Weekly writing, "expertly handled by (Elvey) the doyen of English directors...team work hearty, gags both time honoured and topical and staging generous."
