= The Home Show =

Australian television program

- Genre: Lifestyle
- Presented by: Judy Ann James
- Country of origin: Australia
- Original language: English

Production
- Producer: Judy Ann James
- Production location: TCN-9 Willoughby, New South Wales
- Running time: 60 minutes

Original release
- Network: Nine Network
- Release: 1 November 1956 – 12 November 1957

The Home Show is an Australian television program which aired on Sydney station TCN-9 for about a year, from 1 November 1956 to 12 November 1957. Originally aired on Thursdays, it later moved to Tuesdays. It was replaced with Tuesday at One. The program, along with its replacement, was aimed at the housewives.

Prior to the debut of the program, it had been announced as far back as September.

Broadcast live, the hour-long program was hosted by Judy Ann James, who was also a producer on the show. An edition of the magazine The Australian Women's Weekly from late July 1957 featured an article discussing the hosts of the three main women's programmes on Sydney television, Home Show, Your Home on (with Del Cartwright) on ATN-7 and Women's World (with Mary Rossi) on ABN-2. The magazine referred to James as the youngest of the three hosts, and described her as being married to a director at TCN.

== Reception ==
The Australian Women's Weekly called it a "pleasant little show" and said that "Miss James gives the show a pleasant and unassuming air."
