= The Late Show (1957 TV series) =

- Genre: Variety
- Presented by: Noel Ferrier; Bert Newton; John D'Arcy
- Country of origin: Australia
- Original language: English

Original release
- Network: HSV-7
- Release: 1957 – 1959

The Late Show is an Australian television variety series which aired from 1957 to 1959 on Melbourne station HSV-7. Aired on Tuesdays, Wednesdays and Thursdays and competing in the time-slot with GTV-9's popular In Melbourne Tonight, the series included a mix of music and comedy. People who hosted the series during its run included John D'Arcy, Bert Newton and original host Noel Ferrier.

The 22 August 1957 edition of The Age newspaper said of Bert Newton's debut on the series:

Bert Newton, not yet 20 years of age, made a promising debut in the Late Show on Tuesday night. He has a friendly manner, and plays the role of compere much "straighter" than Graham Kennedy, of GTV-9's In Melbourne Tonight

Although kinescope recording and later video-tape existed during the run of the series, the archival status of the show is unknown, although the Noel Ferrier episodes are reported to be lost, and it is possible the other episodes were also wiped, given the highly erratic survival rate of Australian television of the era (with Sydney-produced soap opera Autumn Affair surviving near-intact, while the Melbourne version of game show Tell the Truth being completely lost). The Late Show was replaced on HSV-7's schedule by Club Seven.
