= Bert Newton =

Australian media personality (1938–2021)

Bert Newton AM MBE
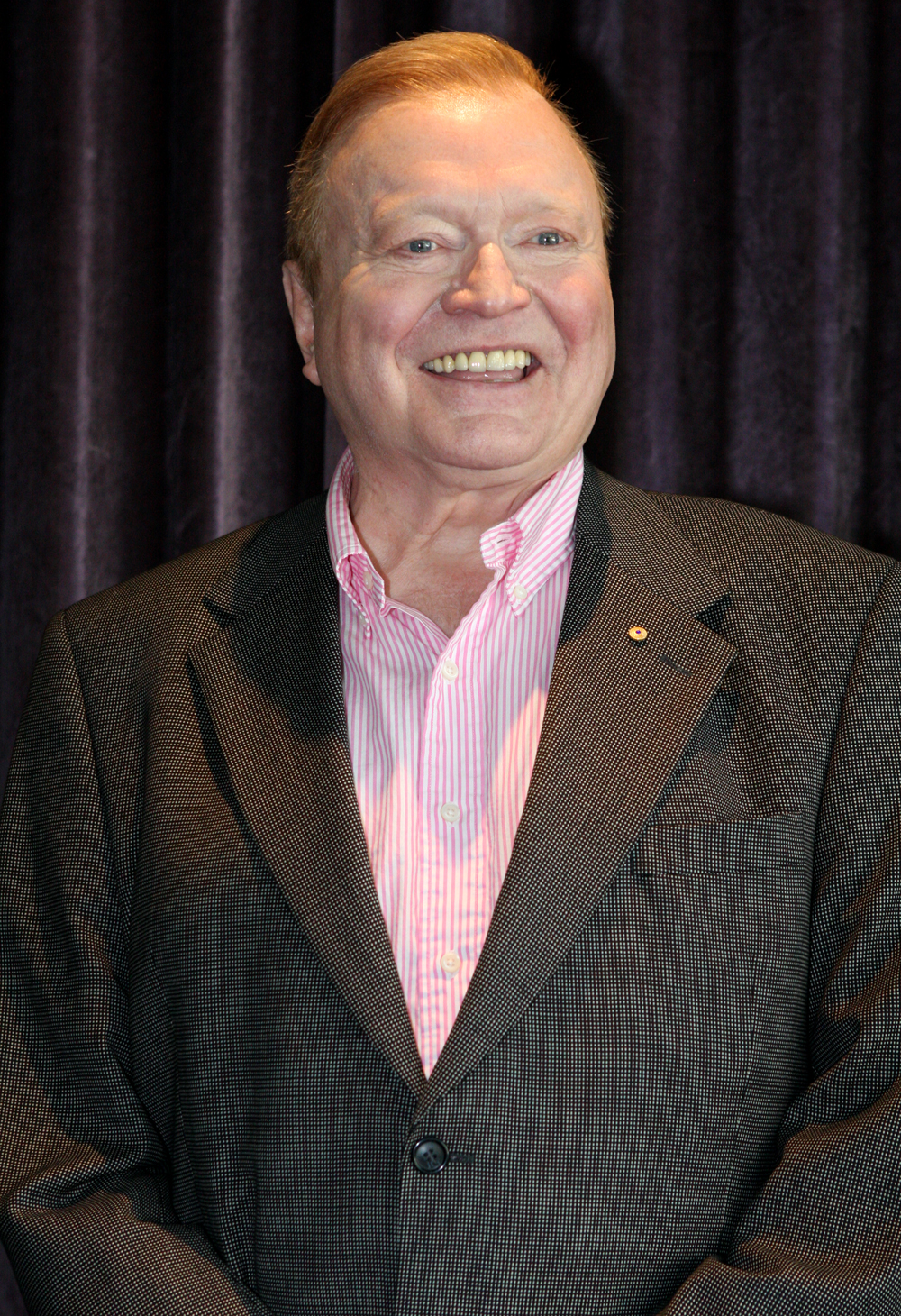
- Newton in 2013
- Born: Albert Watson Newton; 23 July 1938; Fitzroy, Victoria, Australia
- Died: 30 October 2021 (aged 83); Prahran, Victoria, Australia
- Occupations: Television personality; television host; radio presenter; theatre actor
- Years active: 1952–2015
- Known for: In Melbourne Tonight; Good Morning Australia; Logie Awards
- Spouse: Patti McGrath (m. 1974)
- Children: 2, including Matthew

Albert Watson Newton AM MBE (23 July 1938 – 30 October 2021) was an Australian media personality. He was a Logie Hall of Fame inductee, quadruple Gold Logie–winning entertainer, and radio, theatre and television personality and compère.

Newton was known for his collaborations opposite Graham Kennedy and subsequently Don Lane on their respective variety shows, and appearances with his wife, singer Patti Newton.

Newton started his career in radio broadcasting, primarily as an announcer, before becoming a star and fixture of Australian television since its inception in 1956, and was considered both an industry pioneer icon and one of the longest-serving television performers in the world.

Newton was known for his association with both the Nine Network and Ten Network on numerous variety shows, including In Melbourne Tonight, New Faces, Good Morning Australia, 20 to 1 and game show Bert's Family Feud.

== Early life ==
Newton was born in Fitzroy, an inner suburb of Melbourne, Victoria, to Joseph (Joe) and Gladys Newton. He had three brothers (Tom, Jack and Bob) and two sisters (Alice and Elizabeth). He was educated at St Joseph's Marist Brothers Roman Catholic college. In his early years, he had thoughts of entering the priesthood and remained an active Roman Catholic.

== Radio ==
Newton's first paid radio appearance was as a schoolboy on Melbourne radio station 3XY on 10 June 1952, doing advertisements dressed as a clown with Doug McKenzie, who later became Zag in Zig and Zag.

"... there was a radio program on 3XY Melbourne called Scouting Around, compered by the late Tom Jones. One week, the broadcast was recorded at our Scout Hall, and as the direct result of this, I began to appear on 3XY."

This led to regular appearances on a Saturday morning children's show, in which he worked with disc jockey Stan Rofe and McKenzie.

In May 1954, 3XY employed him as a junior announcer (aged 15); by 1955, he was presenting Melbourne Speaks, a vox pop program recorded on the streets of Melbourne's CBD. After GTV-9 purchased 3AK in April 1961, all GTV-9 personalities were expected to present programs on 3AK. Graham Kennedy and Newton hosted a two-hour morning program. He began a morning program on 3UZ in 1976. The Herald and Weekly Times Ltd appointed Newton as general manager of 3DB in 1986, which he combined with on-air appearances until 1988.

== Television ==
=== Early television career ===
Newton began his television career in 1957 at Melbourne's HSV-7, hosting The Late Show. Newton left for GTV-9 in early 1959 to host In Melbourne Today. After appearing in a live commercial on In Melbourne Tonight with his friend Graham Kennedy in 1959, he began to make regular appearances on the show and assumed hosting duties on some episodes. This began a lifelong association with Kennedy.

From 1959 to 1960, he hosted The Bert Newton Show (later retitled Hi-Fi Club) on GTV-9, a series aimed at teenagers.

From 1960 to 1961, Newton appeared in the national Graham Kennedy's Channel 9 Show (a weekly national version of IMT). In January 1962, the show was cancelled and replaced by the similar The Channel 9 Show, hosted by Newton.

=== 1975–92 ===
From 1975 to mid-1992 Newton mainly appeared on the Nine Network.

In 1975 Newton was cast in the role of sidekick and "barrel boy" on The Don Lane Show. He was dubbed "Moonface", and the nickname stuck. Newton frequently appeared in outlandish costumes, often sending up celebrities. Newton memorably sent up Demis Roussos, who was sent on set while Newton was doing the impersonation. Newton remained on the show until it ended in 1983.

Newton briefly hosted his own program, The Bert Newton Show, recorded for the ABC. It was not a success, and he returned to working with Kennedy.

In 1976, Newton replaced long-running compere Frank Wilson on Nine's amateur talent program New Faces. The show was a success, and lasted until 1985. In 1992, Newton hosted another version of New Faces; however, it did not last for long.

In 1981, Newton (and wife Patti) presented a quiz show, Ford Superquiz, produced by the Reg Grundy organisation for the Nine Network.

Tonight with Bert Newton was a short-lived attempt to bring back the spirit of IMT. It aired in 1984. The Bert Newton Show was created for the Seven Network in 1989 as an attempt to woo some of the audience away from The Midday Show with Ray Martin. This, however, did not rate well and was only on air for that year.

=== 1992–2005 ===
In 1992, Newton moved into daytime TV as host of The Morning Show, which was soon renamed Good Morning Australia (GMA) on Network Ten. The show revived Newton's celebrity status and was a continuing success for Ten. GMA was a mix of interviews, music, cooking segments and infomercials. It was broadcast live-to-air on Mondays and Tuesdays, but for the rest of the week live-to-tape (recorded complete and aired later). GMA was cancelled in late 2005 after a 14-year run. Although Newton was offered ongoing employment at Network Ten, he stated that he would return to the Nine Network in 2006.

=== 2006–12 ===
After finishing on GMA. Newton returned to the Nine Network hosting Bert's Family Feud, a revised version of Family Feud, from 2006 and until it was cancelled in May 2007.

From 2006 to 2011, Newton hosted 20 to 1 taking over from Bud Tingwell. In 2007, Newton hosted the retrospective program What a Year with comedian Julia Zemiro, replacing previous hosts Mike Munro and Megan Gale, which took a light-hearted look at significant events from a chosen year in history.

In 2008 Newton appeared as a celebrity contestant on Million Dollar Wheel of Fortune alongside Livinia Nixon and Dawn Fraser. He won the main game, with $3,235 (including a plasma TV) going to his chosen charity, the International Diabetes Institute. On 14 August 2012, Newton appeared as a celebrity contestant on Millionaire Hot Seat and won $5,000 for the charity Sids & Kids.

Newton reputedly received a yearly salary of A$800,000 from Nine during this era.

== Theatre ==
Newton's stage appearances included Professor Marvel/the Wizard of Oz in The Wizard of Oz, Cogsworth in Beauty and the Beast, Franz Liebkind in The Producers and Max in The Sound of Music.

From November 2008, Newton took over the role of The Wizard in the Melbourne production of the musical Wicked, after the sudden death of Rob Guest. The production transferred to Sydney from September 2009. Newton continued to play the role on the national tour, which began in January 2011, opposite Lucy Durack as Glinda, Jemma Rix as Elphaba, David Harris as Fiyero and Maggie Kirkpatrick as Madame Morrible. In 2011 he was part of the Australian cast performing Wicked in Singapore. Altogether, Newton had a three-year run in this show.

In July 2012 Newton joined the Melbourne cast of Annie for a few weeks, taking over the role of President Roosevelt from Alan Jones.

From August 2013 Newton returned to the stage in producer John Frost's production of Grease The Musical, playing disc jockey Vince Fontaine.

Newton played the narrator in the 2015 Australian production of The Rocky Horror Show.

== Filmography ==
=== Television ===
Year	Title	Role	Type
1957	The Late Show	Host	TV series
1959	In Melbourne Today	Host	TV series
1959–60	The Bert Newton Show (later retitled Hi-Fi Club)	Host	TV series
1960–61	Graham Kennedy's Channel 9 Show	Host	TV series
1962	The Channel 9 Show	Host	TV series
1975–83	The Don Lane Show	Sidekick and "barrel boy"	TV series
	The Bert Newton Show	Host	TV series
1976–85	New Faces	Compere	TV talent show series
1981	Ford Superquiz	Presenter (with wife Patti)	TV quiz show series
1984	Tonight With Bert Newton	Host	TV series
1989	The Bert Newton Show	Host	TV series
1992–2005	Good Morning Australia	Host	TV series
2006–07	Bert's Family Feud	Host	TV game show series
2006–11	20 to 1	Host	TV series
2007	What a Year	Host (with Julia Zemiro)	TV series
2008	Million Dollar Wheel of Fortune	Celebrity contestant	TV game show series
2012	Millionaire Hot Seat	Celebrity contestant	TV game show series

=== Film ===
Year	Title	Role	Type
1981	Doctors & Nurses	Mr. Cody	Feature film
1980	Fatty Finn	Mr. Finn	Feature film
2003	The Wannabes	Himself	Feature film
2007	Remembering Nigel	The Agent	Film
2014	When the Queen Came to Town	Narrator (voice only)	Documentary

== Discography ==
=== Studio albums ===
Title	Album details
The Bert & Patti Family Album (with Patti Newton)	Released: 1977; Format: LP; Label: Pisces Records (L 27027)

=== Singles ===
List of singles, with Australian chart positions
Year	Title	Peak chart positions
Year	Title	AUS
1960	"Letter to Virginia" / "Deck of Cards"	—N/a
1960	"To a Sleeping Beauty" / "The White Magnolia Tree" (Laurie Wilson, organ) W&G WG-E-1354	—N/a
1968	"The Donkey's Dream" / "Befana and the Three Kings"	—N/a
1981	"Bring Back the Spirit of Christmas" / "See The Light" (with The Debney Park High School Band) Fable FB-345	25

== Writing ==
=== Books ===
Year	Title	Notes
1979	Bert!: Bert Newton's Own Story	Autobiography

== Logies ==
=== Awards and nominations ===
Newton was an institution of the Logie Awards since the awards since 1959. He was nominated for many Logie Awards and won several:

Association	Year	Award	Awarded for	Won
Logie Award	1979	Gold Logie	The Don Lane Show	Won
Logie Award	1983	Gold Logie	The Don Lane Show	Won
Logie Award	1982	Gold Logie	New Faces	Won
Logie Award	1984	Gold Logie	New Faces	Won
Logie Awards	1988	Logies Hall of Fame		Honoured
Logie Award	1978	Gold Logie	The Don Lane Show	Nominated
Logie Award	1983	Gold Logie	The Don Lane Show	Nominated
Logie Award	1983	Gold Logie	New Faces	Nominated
Logie award	2006	Gold Logie	Good Morning Australia AKA Good Morning Australia with Bert Newton	Nominated
Logie Award	2007	Gold Logie	20 to One and Bert's Family Feud	Nominated
Logie Award	1993	Most Popular Light Entertainment Personality	Good Morning Morning AKA Good Morning Australia with Bert Newton	Nominated

Three 'Best Compere' awards: 1972, 1973, 1974 (for his role in In Melbourne Tonight and The Graham Kennedy Show)

=== Hosting ===
Newton hosted the Logie Awards ceremony on 19 occasions: 1968–1980, 1982, 1984, 1989, 1993 and 2010, and co-host in 2006. He holds the record for both the most Logies hosted and the most Logies hosted in a continuous run. Some notable moments of his hosting include:

- At the 1979 Logies awards Newton said to Muhammad Ali, "I like the boy", not knowing that "boy" could be taken as a racial slur. Ali responded "Did he call me Roy?" and members of the audience, including Don Lane, shouted to Newton to say "Yes—Roy!". Newton looked puzzled and later explained to the media that he did not realise that "boy" was used as a racial slur. Ali realised Newton's use was meant endearingly and they literally kissed and made up later on. Immediately after the incident, Newton lightened the tension of the incident by saying: "I'll change my name, my religion ... anything", referring to Ali's change of name from Cassius Clay when he adopted Islam in 1964, and proceeding to shake his hands in feigned nervousness. "I like the boy" was a catchphrase Newton had previous used on a commercial playing Colonel Sanders.
- In 1973, American actor Michael Cole, best known for his role in the TV series The Mod Squad, accepted an award while obviously drunk and ended his barely coherent thank-you speech with the word "shit", to which Newton, after a classic pause, merely added 'congratulations'.
- In 2006, after the awards, he had a fall and injured himself. The injury was visible for a number of Bert's Family Feud episodes.

== Honours ==
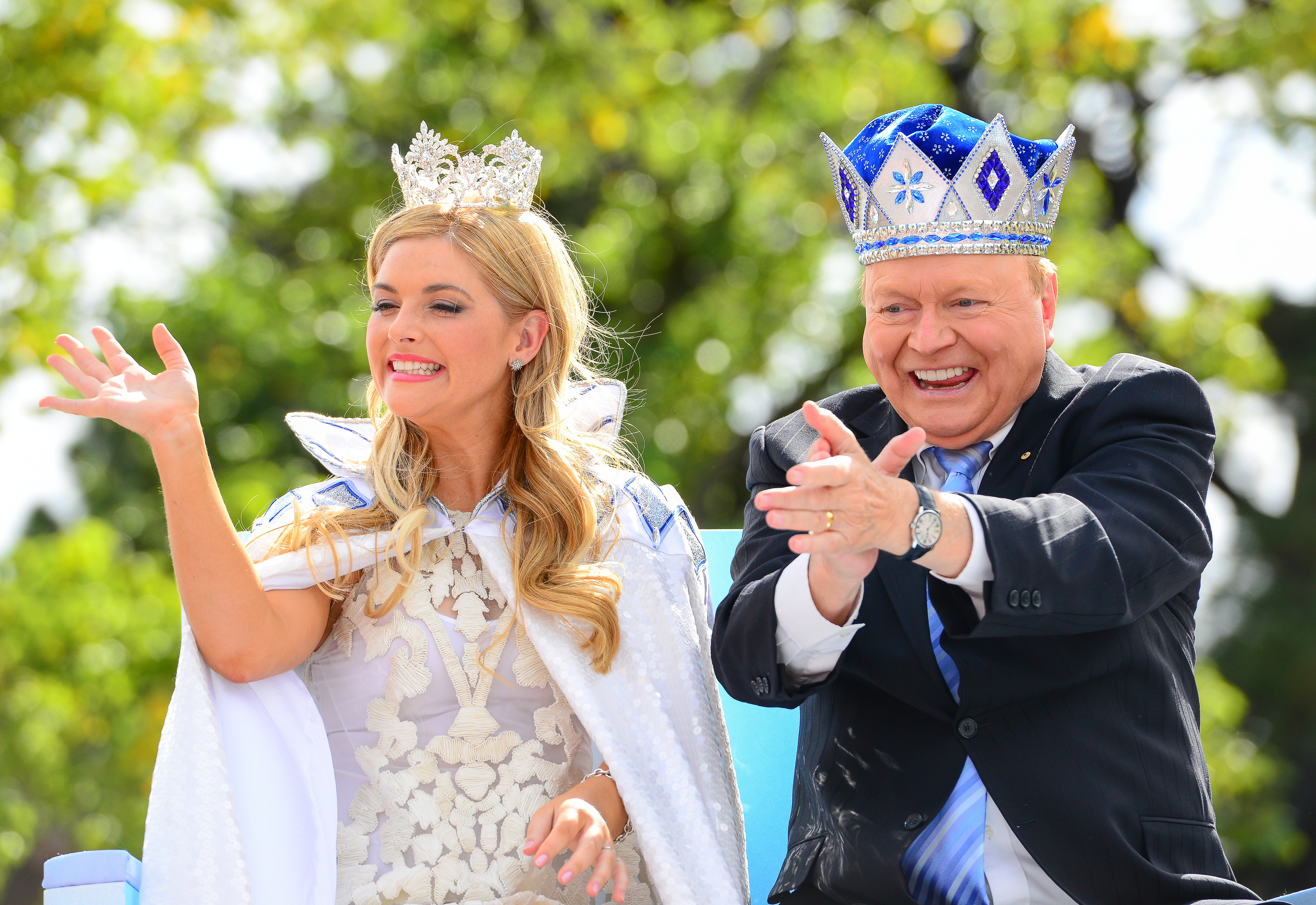
Moomba monarchs for 2014 – Lucy Durack and Newton

Newton was appointed a Member of the Order of the British Empire in 1979, for his service to the performing arts.

On 12 June 2006, he was made a Member of the Order of Australia "for service to the entertainment industry as a presenter, actor, comedian, and through support for a range of medical research and charitable organisations".

Newton was the first Melbourne-born King of Moomba in 1978.

A song called "For Bert" was written by GTV-9's musical director Brian Rangott. The lyrics include:

Everything I do,
I do for Bert –
[...]
Some may think Bert's not much,
But they like his gentle touch –
Everything I do,
I do for Bert!

In 1997, Newton was the subject of a This Is Your Life tribute. His wife Patti was honoured with her own tribute in 2001.

The Best of Bert Newton was aired in 2002. Channel Nine Salutes Bert Newton was broadcast in early 2004, depicting the career of Newton from his earliest days.

In 2001, he was awarded the Centenary Medal.

Show business awards include a Mo Award (1995), two Television Society of Australia awards (1981 and 1983), three Penguin Citations and three Pater (Professional Excellence in Television and Radio Arts and Sciences) awards for radio.

To celebrate the 50th anniversary of television in Australia, Channel 9 ran a show titled 50 Years, 50 Stars, where they looked back at the top 50 stars of Australian television. Newton was listed as the No. 1 Australian TV star of the past 50 years.

On 1 July 2008, Newton was named Victorian of the Year.

On 23 July 2008, Channel 9 marked Newton's 70th birthday with a one-hour special of This Is Your Life hosted by Mike Munro.

In 2018, he was honoured by Australia Post in a series of issued stamps called the Australian Legends series that features stars from Australian television.

Two weeks after his death, on 12 November 2021, Newton was given a Victorian state funeral, conducted at St. Patrick's Cathedral in Melbourne.

== Personal life ==
In 1974, Newton married Patti McGrath with whom he worked on television. The Newtons had two children, son Matthew and daughter Lauren. Matthew Newton is an actor who has appeared in a number of Australian films and television dramas. Lauren Newton married swimmer Matt Welsh.

In 1993, a gambling problem led Newton to near bankruptcy and a $1 million debt.

In 2020, Newton was the subject of an episode of Who Do You Think You Are? which focused primarily on his father and maternal grandparents. The episode first aired on 26 May 2020.

=== Health and death ===
In November 2012, Newton underwent quadruple heart bypass surgery, having been admitted to hospital twice in the twelve months prior.

Newton was admitted to Epworth Hospital several times for pneumonia recovery in March and April 2017.

Newton had a toe infection in late 2020 and, due to complications treating this, one of his legs was amputated below the knee in May 2021. He died in Prahran, Victoria, on 30 October 2021, aged 83. He is interred at the Cedars section of the Springvale Botanical Cemetery, Melbourne.
