= Campfire Favourites =

- Genre: Music television
- Presented by: Frank Ifield
- Country of origin: Australia
- Original language: English

Production
- Production location: TCN-9 Willoughby, New South Wales
- Running time: 15 minutes

Original release
- Network: Nine Network
- Release: 1956 – January 1957

Campfire Favourites is an Australian television series which aired in 1956 on Sydney station TCN-9. Despite having a very brief run of less than 2 months, it is notable as one of the earliest Australian-produced television series, and for featuring Frank Ifield.

The series ended around the same time as two other early Australian series, The Johnny O'Connor Show and Accent on Strings, an article in Women's Weekly suggesting the three series were unable to obtain sponsors.

Broadcast at 7:15PM on Thursdays, the 15-minute series was themed around country music. The set design (based on available except, see below) was basic, consisting of a painted backdrop of Eucalyptus trees.

== Episode status ==
A very brief excerpt appeared in a mid-1960s television special about Australian television. The excerpt appeared on YouTube. This indicates that at least one of the episodes was kinescoped, kinescope recording being the method used to record live and as-live television in the days before video-tape. However, it is not known if any kinescope recordings still exist of the series today.

== See also ==
- List of Australian music television shows
