= Beauty Case =

- Genre: Lifestyle
- Presented by: Elaine White
- Country of origin: Australia
- Original language: English

Production
- Running time: 45 minutes

Original release
- Network: TCN-9
- Release: 12 February – 5 November 1958

Beauty Case is an Australian television series which aired from 12 February to 5 November 1958 on Sydney television station TCN-9. The weekly series was broadcast on Wednesdays. TV listings suggest the episodes usually aired in a 45-minute time-slot. Assuming the series had a sponsor, it is not known what the running time was minus the commercials.

As the title suggests, the series was about beauty and fashion. It was produced and compered by Elaine White. The week after the series ended, White began hosting a series called Home and Beauty on the same station.
