= Mary Parker (Australian actress) =

Actress and television presenter (1930–2023)

- Born: Mary Clare Avison Parker; 31 October 1930; Keynsham, Somerset, England
- Died: 13 May 2023 (aged 92); Melbourne, Victoria, Australia
- Occupations: Actress; television presenter; announcer; news anchor
- Years active: 1951–late 1990s
- Spouse: Paul Fitzgerald (m. 1957; died 2017)
- Children: 7

Mary Clare Avison Fitzgerald (née Parker; 31 October 1930 – 13 May 2023) was an English-born actress and Australian television presenter, who started her career in her native country as a stage, screen and television actress. After emigrating to Australia, she became notable for being the first woman to appear on Melbourne television.

== Early life and personal life ==
Parker was born on 31 October 1930 in Keynsham, Somerset, and was a twin; her sister Sue was born two hours later. Her father, Charles Avison Parker, was a British native and high-ranking officer with the Royal Navy and later served with the Australian Navy; her mother was Australian. Parker's brother Michael served in the Royal Navy with Prince Philip and became his secretary and equerry-in-waiting to Queen Elizabeth II.

Parker grew up in the Melbourne suburb of Kew and attended Genazzano Convent School. She was married to Australian portrait artist Paul Fitzgerald in 1957 until his death in 2017. They had seven children.

== Career ==
In her early career in England, film studios likened her star quality to that of Debbie Reynolds. Fitzgerald stated that "everybody in England knew Mary Parker [...] I've seen her name in lights on Shaftesbury Avenue and then she worked on TV as an announcer. They also brought her out to Australia in 1956 to open the (television coverage of the) 1956 Summer Olympic Games alongside Tony Charlton – she was the first woman on television in (Melbourne)."

In England, she worked on stage in West End Theatre productions, and in film and television dramas with the likes of Douglas Fairbanks Jr., Boris Karloff and Lloyd Bridges and had numerous experiences on live television broadcasting at the BBC alongside celebrities such as singer Petula Clark.

In Australia, she was one of three people to host Channel Seven test broadcasts at their Melbourne station HSV7 prior to their official opening night; the other two test broadcasters were Eric Pearce and Danny Webb. On 4 November 1956, HSV-7's opening night, she became one the first female news anchors when she presented the news bulletin alongside Pearce.

== Death ==
Parker died at a hospital in Melbourne, Victoria on the weekend of 13 May 2023. She was 92.

== British film career ==
- The Vise – "Gabriel's Choice" (1954) as Marianne Anderson; "The Deception" (1955) as Dorothy; "Kill Me My Love" (1957) as Irene
- The Hostage (1956) as Rosa Gonzuelo
- Colonel March of Scotland Yard – "Present Tense" (1957) as Emily
- You Lucky People! (1955) as Pvt. Sally Briggs
- Third Party Risk (1954) as Nancy
- Douglas Fairbanks Presents – "The International Settlement" (1954) as Elizabeth; "The Trap" (1954) as Peggy

== Australian television career ==
Parker top and tailed various programs in the early days of HSV-7.

She also presented the following programs:

- Beauty Is My Business
- Eric and Mary (with Eric Pearce)
- Guest of the Week
- The Judy Jack Show (covered when the regular hostess was indisposed)

Parker sometimes played piano as a prelude to her regular series of interviews. She started an interview with violinist Des Bradley by accompanying him in a rendition of Saint Saëns's The Swan. Parker once performed a live duet with pianist Freddy Cole.

Parker shares the honour of being among the first women on Australian television, with Babs McKinnon, the first woman on Sydney television, when TCN-9 was opened on 16 September 1956.

== See also ==
- Colonel March of Scotland Yard, British television program
- Douglas Fairbanks Presents, British television program
- You Lucky People!, British movie
- Third Party Risk, British movie
