= Channel 9 TV Tower =

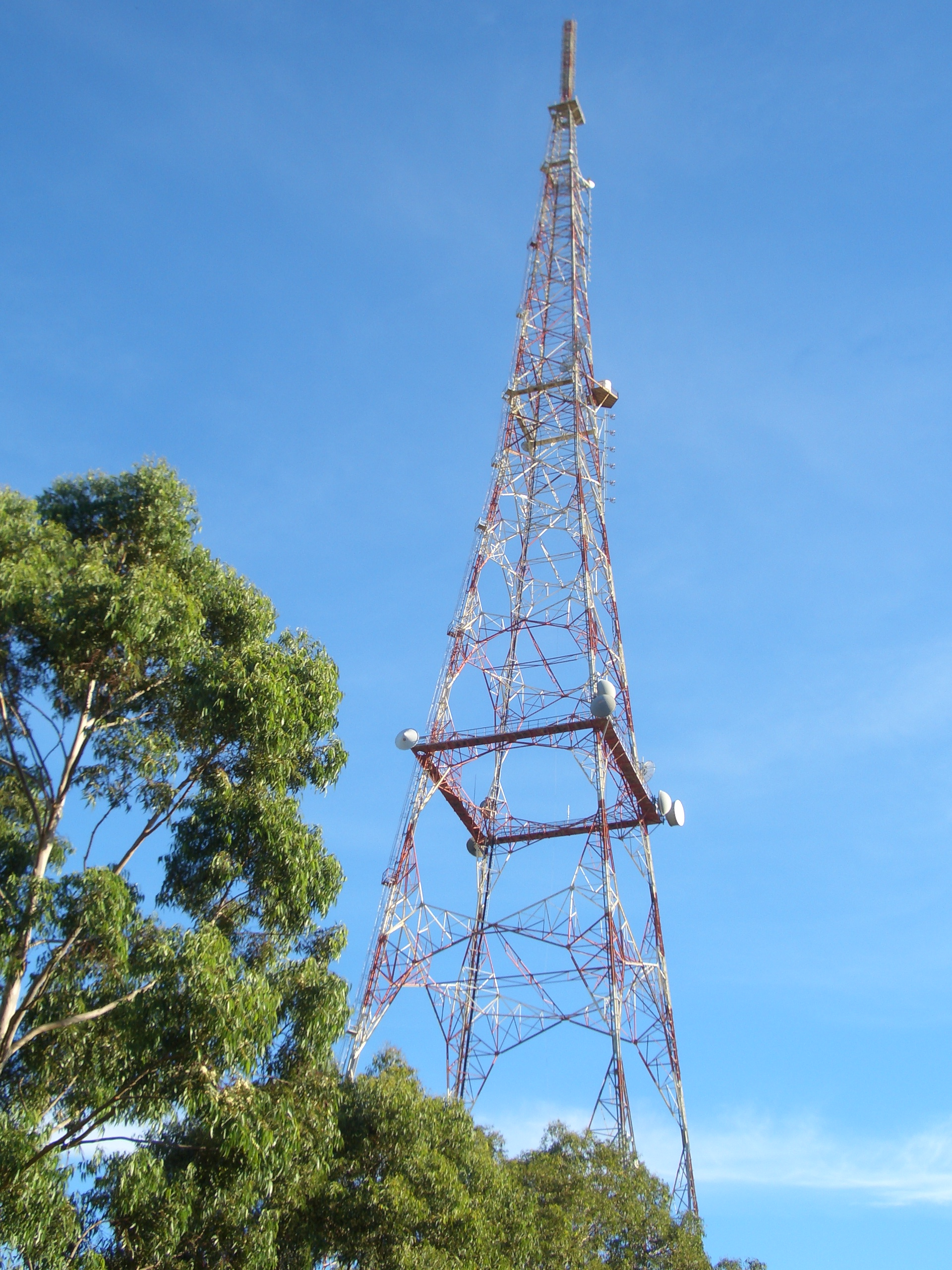

- Location within Australia

General information
- Status: Demolished in 2021
- Type: Steel lattice television tower
- Location: Sydney
- Coordinates: 33°48′42″S 151°11′45″E
- Completed: 1965
- Owner: Nine Entertainment

Height
- Height: 233 m (764 ft)

The Channel 9 TV Tower also known as the Willoughby Tower or the TCN-9 TXA TV Tower, was a free-standing lattice tower located in the Sydney suburb of Willoughby at 6 Artarmon Road. It was built adjacent to its studios as the broadcast tower for TCN 9, the Sydney flagship television station of the Nine Network. The tower had a square cross section with a base width of 112 feet. 347 tons of steel were used in its construction.

Completed in 1965, the tower stood 233 m (765 ft) tall and was the tallest free-standing lattice tower in Australia. The tower was the tallest structure in Sydney until the Sydney Tower was completed in 1981. Demolition of the tower commenced in April 2021 after TCN 9 relocated to North Sydney with work completed in November 2021.
