= The Bert Newton Show =

- Also known as: Hi-Fi Club
- Genre: Variety; Music television
- Presented by: Bert Newton
- Country of origin: Australia
- Original language: English

Original release
- Network: GTV-9
- Release: 1959 – 1960

The Bert Newton Show is an Australian television series which aired from 1959 to 1960. Aired at 6:30PM Saturdays on Melbourne station GTV-9, it was aimed at teenagers and featured acts lip-syncing their songs.

It competed with the ABC series Six O'Clock Rock and HSV-7's Swallow's Juniors. It was preceded on GTV's line-up by Laurel and Hardy and followed by Pick a Box. In 1960, it moved to Thursdays and became Hi-Fi Club, running for several more months.

== Episode status ==
An excerpt of Hi-Fi Club (which looks like a kinescoped film transfer of a video-tape or vice versa) appears on YouTube suggesting that episode or episodes are still extant, although exactly how much footage still exists is unknown. An episode under the title The Bert Newton Show is held by the National Film and Sound Archive
