= Isador Goodman =

Isador Goodman (AM)
- Born: Moses Isidore Goodman; 27 May 1909; Cape Town, South Africa
- Origin: Royal College of Music
- Died: 2 December 1982 (aged 73)
- Genre: Classical
- Occupations: Musician, conductor, composer
- Instruments: Piano

Isador Goodman AM (27 May 1909 – 2 December 1982), frequently misspelled Isidor Goodman, was a South African-Australian Jewish pianist, composer and conductor. He became a household name in Australia in the 1930s-1970s, taught at the New South Wales Conservatorium of Music for 50 years, introduced many Australians to classical music, and contributed hugely to music making in his adopted country.

== Biography ==
Moses Isidore Goodman was born in Cape Town, South Africa in 1909 to musical parents of Jewish descent, who had immigrated from eastern Europe. He started studying music early, as well as composing. One of his compositions was performed professionally when he was only six. At age seven, Goodman played Mozart's Piano Concerto No. 20 in D minor with the Cape Town Symphony Orchestra. After his father died when he was 12, his mother took him to London for its musical opportunities.

Goodman studied piano at the Royal College of Music with Lloyd Powell, who had been a student of Ferruccio Busoni. He studied conducting with Constant Lambert. In 1924, at age 15, Goodman played Liszt's Piano Concerto No. 1 in E-flat under Malcolm Sargent. This concerto was to become his "calling card".

His mother remarried, choosing an uncle of her first husband. They returned to South Africa and left the young Goodman in London because of its greater musical opportunities.

== Career ==
In 1929 at age 20, Goodman accepted an offer to teach at the New South Wales Conservatorium of Music in Sydney, Australia. Local musicians opposed the decision by the director W. Arundel Orchard to bring in a man from abroad for a coveted position. Goodman was to teach at "the Con", on and off, for 50 years. While Professor of Piano by day, he often played all night at jazz clubs in the company of 'hardened drinkers and SP bookies'.

In 1931, the English critic Neville Cardus, who knew nothing of the 22-year-old Goodman, attended two of his recitals. His review described him as

"the best pianist in Australia. I would cheerfully stake my reputation on Mr Goodman's playing in any capital city of Europe in pieces definitely pianistic or romantic in style. ... he is a natural pianist, he plays the piano as most of the rest of us breathe ... I did not believe it possible that I could ever again listen to the D flat Waltz of Chopin with virgin and delighted ears. But Mr Goodman rippled the hackneyed piece as though for the first time – Horowitz himself could not have recreated it anew with more enchanting touch and tone and rhythm".

Goodman became well known in society circles; the Governor of New South Wales Sir Philip Game and Lady Game became his patrons and personal friends. One night in May 1932, Goodman was at Government House for dinner with the Games. After the governor was repeatedly interrupted for consultation, Goodman asked if he ought to leave. Game said, "No, that's not necessary, you see, I am about to dismiss the Premier".

Later in 1932 Goodman toured Australia and New Zealand for the Tait organisation as associate artist for the visiting Scottish tenor Joseph Hislop. They did not get on, as Hislop felt Goodman was upstaging him. They even came to blows on one occasion. On 1 July 1932 Goodman was soloist in a concert by the National Broadcasting Symphony Orchestra. A predecessor of the Sydney Symphony Orchestra, the group broadcast live from the Conservatorium to mark the official start of the Australian Broadcasting Commission.

In 1935 Goodman wrote the musical score for Harry Southwell's film, The Burgomeister. The score included a drinking song, a lullaby, a peasant song, and a waltz.

Becoming the musical director of cinemas in Sydney and Melbourne, Goodman played classical pieces between films. In 1940 he accompanied the English actor Noël Coward when he appeared in Melbourne.

During World War II, in 1942 Goodman joined the Australian Army, rising to the rank of lieutenant. He gave 200 performances to over 150,000 servicemen. In September 1944 he was discharged as medically unfit. He dedicated his New Guinea Fantasy for piano and orchestra to the Australian servicemen. Although it was recorded towards the end of Goodman's life by the Melbourne Symphony Orchestra under Patrick Thomas, the score was later lost, until its rediscovery at the State Library of New South Wales. It received its first live performance at Llewellyn Hall, ANU School of Music on 15 August 2025, by the Canberra Symphony Orchestra with Simon Tedeschi as soloist.

After the war, Goodman returned to Great Britain. His farewell performance at the Sydney Town Hall included the first performance in Australia of Prokofiev's 7th Sonata. Despite playing at a Royal Command Performance for King George VI and Queen Elizabeth at St. James's Palace in October 1948, Goodman found it difficult to re-enter British cultural circles and could not find steady work in England in the postwar years.

He returned to Australia, this time permanently. In 1955 he wrote a lush, impressionist score for the Australian director Charles Chauvel's landmark 1955 film Jedda, about Aborigines. Elsa Chauvel, the director's wife, scrapped the most innovative passages and replaced them with old-fashioned commercial 'mood' music. A late 20th-century review of a video of the film described Goodman's music as being considered now as too European to be appropriate for its topic of Aborigines but noted that the European viewpoint was typical of the time.

In 1956 Goodman played on the opening night of television station TCN9 in Sydney. He served as the channel's musical director for two years. In 1967 he returned to teaching at the NSW Conservatorium.

In the early days of Australian television, Goodman starred in two music series of his own. The Isador Goodman Show ran on Melbourne station HSV-7 from 1956 to 1957. His second series was for Sydney station TCN-9 and was called Music for You, running from 1958 to 1960.

Seriously injured in a car crash in 1969, Goodman was sidelined from performing for four years. He made a triumphant return to the concert stage with an all-Chopin recital in Sydney in 1973. Later that year he played with the Melbourne Symphony Orchestra in the first series of concerts at the new Sydney Opera House. In February 1974 he appeared in concerts conducted by the American Arthur Fiedler. In 1975, he played Liszt's Hungarian Rhapsody No. 2 at the Concert for Darwin, staged to raise funds for the city devastated by Cyclone Tracy.

On Sunday, 13 July 1980 Isador took on the triple role of conductor-soloist-arranger for the Willoughby Symphony Orchestra's concert at the Sydney Opera House which was a spectacular success.

Goodman performed in a recital at the new Melbourne Concert Hall (now Hamer Hall) on 31 July 1982. His last recital was at the Sydney Town Hall on 26 September 1982.

Goodman died of cancer on 2 December 1982. Later the same day, his lifelong friend and co-teacher at the Sydney Conservatorium, Lindley Evans, also died.

== Marriage and family ==
Goodman was married four times. His fourth wife, Virginia Goodman, survived him.

== Legacy and honours ==
- 1981, Goodman was made a Member of the Order of Australia on Australia Day, in recognition for his service to music.
- 1983, his fourth wife Virginia Goodman published a biography of him, Isador Goodman: A Life in Music.

== Recordings ==
- Richard Addinsell's Warsaw Concerto, George Gershwin's Rhapsody in Blue, Litolff's "Scherzo" from Concerto Symphonique No. 4, and Liszt's Hungarian Fantasy, Phillips Concert Classic, reissue, ArkivMusic
- Isador Goodman: Dangerous Moonlight, Piano Classics for the Silver Screen, with the Melbourne Symphony Orchestra under Patrick Thomas, Philips Eloquence CD, 2005
- The Yesterday Concerto, John Lanchbery's arrangement of John Lennon and Paul McCartney's music, for piano and orchestra – Isador Goodman, with Sydney Symphony Orchestra under Lanchbery, ABC
- Paraphrases and Piano Transcriptions: An Anthology of Historic Performances · Volume 1 (1930-1954), includes Isador Goodman, 1932 recording of Schultz-Evler's Concert Arabesques on Strauss's Waltz 'On the Beautiful Blue Danube' , Naxos
- Isador Goodman, Transcriptions Without Apologies, EMI, 1974 includes Albéniz arr. Godowsky (Tango), Wagner arr. Louis Brassin (Magic Fire Music from Die Walküre), Schubert arr. Liszt (Hark! Hark! The Lark), Scarlatti arr. Tausig (Pastorale and Capriccio), Delibes arr. Dohnányi (Naila Waltzes), Schumann arr. Liszt (Spring Night), Maurice Ravel (Alborada del gracioso), Bach arr. Busoni (Rejoice, Beloved Christians), Manuel de Falla (Ritual Fire Dance), and Verdi arr. Liszt (Rigoletto Concert Paraphrase)

== Sources ==
- Live Performance Australia Hall of Fame
- Virginia Goodman, Isador Goodman: A Life in Music, Collins, 1983
