= Rendezvous at Romano's =

- Genre: Variety
- Presented by: Harp Maguire
- Starring: Herbie Marks
- Country of origin: Australia
- Original language: English
- No. of seasons: 1
- No. of episodes: 4

Production
- Running time: 30 minutes

Original release
- Network: TCN-9
- Release: 2 April – 23 April 1957

Rendezvous at Romano's was an Australian television series which aired on Sydney station TCN-9. The series debuted 2 April 1957 and ran to 23 April of the same year, for a total of four episodes. The series aired on Tuesdays at 9:30PM.

The series was a variety show. An article in the 10 April 1957 edition of Australian Women's Weekly listed Harp Maguire as the host, Herbie Marks and his trio as among the cast. along with Peggy Brooker. The description of the show by the magazine suggests that the now-defunct Romano's restaurant in Sydney was the setting.
