= Robert Monahan =

Australian barrister and judge (1898–1975)

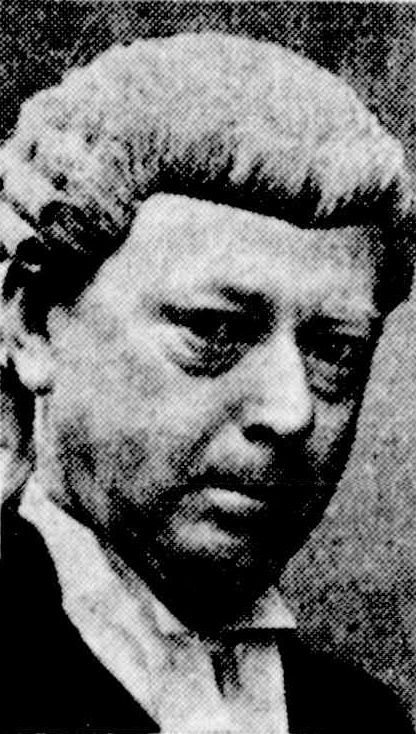
Robert Vincent Monahan (1898–1975).

Sir Robert Vincent Monahan QC (11 April 1898 – 10 May 1975) was an Australian lawyer and judge who served on the Supreme Court of Victoria from 1955 to 1970.

Monahan was born in Swan Hill, Victoria, to Mary Frances (née Nolan) and Patrick Martin Monahan. He attended St Patrick's College, Ballarat, before going on to study law at the University of Melbourne. Monahan was admitted to the bar in 1923, and opened his own chambers in 1931. He developed a reputation as one of Melbourne's leading personal injury and criminal defence lawyers. Monahan appeared in over 100 murder trials, and only one of his clients was ever executed. He was appointed King's Counsel in 1947.

In March 1955, Monahan was appointed to the Supreme Court of Victoria in an acting capacity. His appointment was confirmed in October 1955. On the court, Monahan mainly adjudicated criminal trials, personal injury matters, and divorce cases. He was created a Knight Bachelor in 1967, and retired in 1970, succeeded by Ninian Stephen. Outside of his work, his chief passion was horse racing – he once won £50,000 on the Irish Sweepstakes Irish Derby with his bookmaker friend Albert Smith. Monahan married Lillie Elevia Bowman in 1929; they had four children.

== See also ==
- List of Judges of the Supreme Court of Victoria
