= Mike Munro =

Australian journalist and TV presenter

Mike Munro AM
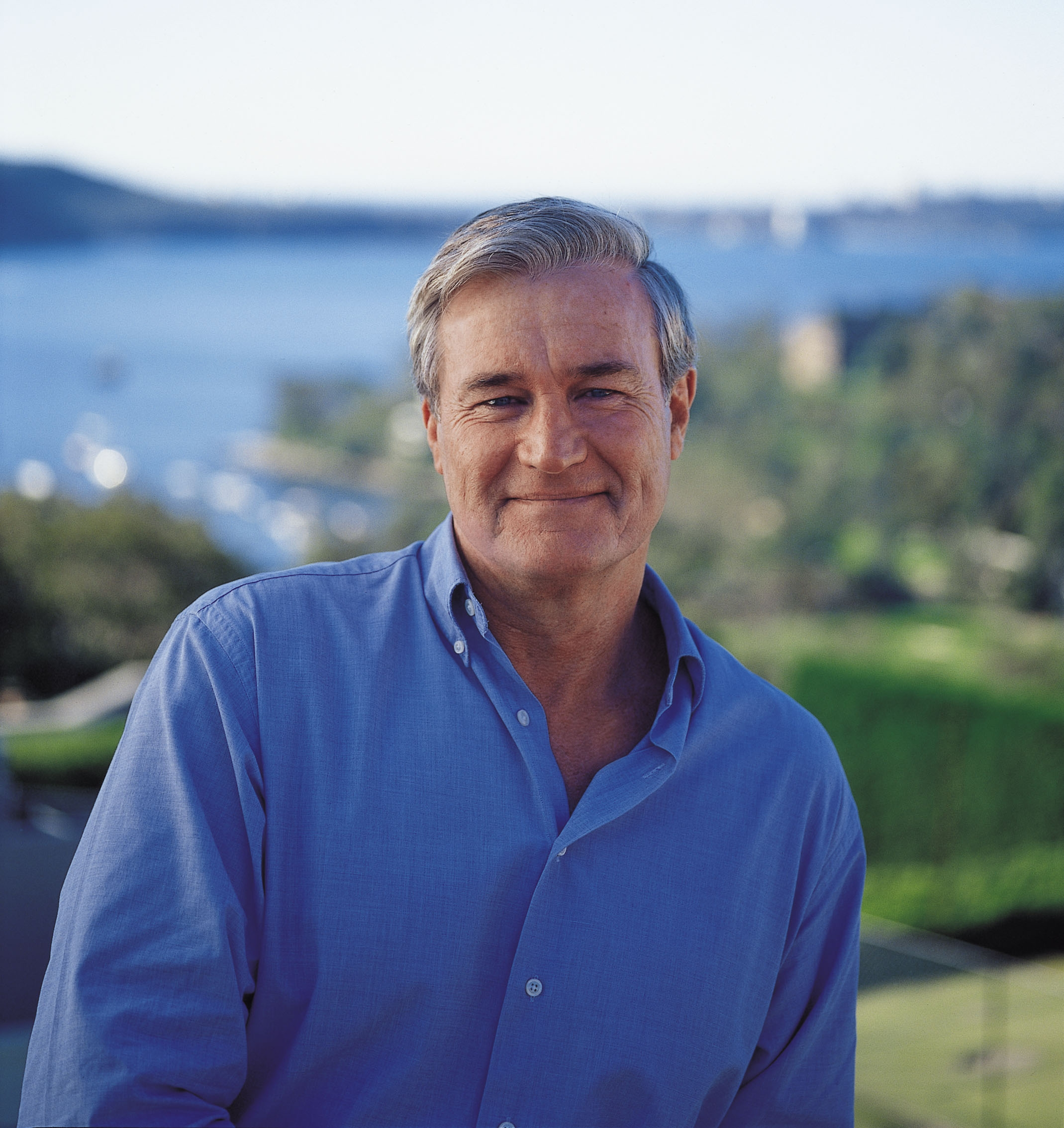
- Born: Michael Kenneth Munro; 12 April 1953 (age 73); Sydney, New South Wales, Australia
- Other name: Mike Munro
- Education: Sacred Heart Marist Bros School Mosman; Marist College North Shore
- Occupations: Journalist; news presenter; television presenter
- Years active: 1982−present
- Notable credits: 60 Minutes; A Current Affair; This Is Your Life; Missing Persons Unit; Nine News; Sunday Night
- Spouse: Lea Munro
- Children: 2

Michael Kenneth Munro (born 12 April 1953), is an Australian journalist and television presenter.

== Early life ==
Munro cites a tough childhood—with an abusive and alcoholic mother—as one of the main reasons behind his motivation to succeed. Munro attended Sacred Heart Primary School in Mosman, New South Wales, and Marist Catholic College North Shore in North Sydney. He began his career at 17 as a copyboy on The Daily Mirror in 1971. He stayed in newspapers for 7 years, before trying television and not liking it. So he returned to newspapers when Rupert Murdoch sent him to New York to work in the NewsCorp bureau writing for newspapers in Great Britain and Australia.

== Television career ==
In 1982, he returned to Sydney and television, where he started as a senior reporter in the Channel 10 newsroom. In 1984, he joined the Nine Network and Mike Willesee on the Willesee current affairs program. Two years later he replaced George Negus as the fifth male reporter on 60 Minutes, where he remained for the next seven years, becoming well known for his interviews with celebrities, including Madonna, Barbra Streisand, Bette Midler and Katharine Hepburn.

Munro became a reporter and later the host of A Current Affair. In 1996, Munro was the reporter at the centre of the infamous Paxton family expose. Munro was replaced as the host of the show in 2003. His then boss, Peter Meakin subsequently described Munro's situation/demeanour at that time as "a little on the nose, a little out of favour, a little too brash". Meakin added that he did "really admire his (Munro's) courage and his grace" ... "in those last few months at A Current Affair because he did a brilliant job" even when he knew he was going to lose the role. Munro said he lost the job because he was continually complaining to management about A Current Affair becoming 'A Consumer Affair' and no longer doing serious investigations, instead focusing on consumer and diet stories. For Munro, the final straw came on the night he had to introduce another reporter's story on a toothbrush survey.

He is synonymous with the biographical show This Is Your Life, which he hosted from 1995 until 2005 and then again in 2008.

In 2005 he replaced Georgie Gardner on National Nine News: Afternoon Edition. In 2006 he stepped down from National Nine News Afternoon Edition but continued to present Sydney's National Nine News on weekends; he remained in this position until 2008.

Also in 2006, Munro hosted the television series Missing Persons Unit and What a Year, alongside Megan Gale, which first aired on the Nine Network on 2 October 2006. But in 2007, they were replaced by Bert Newton and Julia Zemiro and since then the show had been axed.

On 26 October 2008, Munro resigned from the Nine Network after 22 years with the network.

On 7 January 2009, he signed a three-year contract with rival Seven Network to become the founding host of a new current affairs program Sunday Night. In addition to this, he also substituted for David Koch on the top-rating breakfast show, Sunrise.

In January 2014, Network Ten announced that Munro had joined the network. On 9 February 2014, he commenced as the presenter of Ten Eyewitness News Weekend. Munro later resigned in protest from Network Ten, after completing his 12-month contract, due to dozens of staff being retrenched from the news department.

In 2014, Munro was made a member of the Order of Australia for his community work and services to journalism.

In 2017, Munro hosted and helped to produce a four part science-based documentary series for Foxtel's History Channel on Bushrangers. Lawless – The Real Bushrangers. The four episodes featured the crime scenes of Ned Kelly, Ben Hall, Captain Moonlite, and the Kenniff brothers. One of the one-hour specials included Munro's great uncles, Paddy and Jimmy Kenniff, one of whom was hanged in Brisbane jail in 1903 after being convicted of murdering a police constable and a station manager in the Carnarvon Ranges in Queensland.

In 2018, Munro hosted Mateship – Australia & USA: A Century Together, a one-hour documentary on Foxtel's History channel celebrating 100 years of the close bonds that unite Australia and America. Since 4 July 1918, the United States of America and Australia have never fought a major war without each other. It is one of the longest alliances in modern history.

In August 2019 HarperCollins published Munro's book, The Last Bushrangers: When History Becomes Personal — The Story of the Murderous Kenniff Gang.

== Honours ==
In the 2014 Queen's Birthday Honours List, Munro was appointed as a Member of the Order of Australia (AM), for "significant service to journalism as a television current affairs reporter and presenter, and to the community as an ambassador for a range of charitable organisations".

== Personal life ==
Munro is married to Lea, and they have two children.
