= Eric and Mary =

- Genre: Talk show
- Presented by: Eric Pearce; Mary Parker
- Country of origin: Australia
- Original language: English

Production
- Running time: 15 minutes

Original release
- Network: HSV
- Release: 7 November 1956

Eric and Mary is an Australian television programme which aired in 1956. It was one of the earliest Australian-produced television series. It was an "informal programme with guest artists", likely an interview show, hosted by Eric Pearce and Mary Parker. It was broadcast on Melbourne station HSV-7. The station began broadcasting on 4 November 1956, and Eric and Mary debuted a few days later on the 7th.

Broadcast in a fifteen-minute time-slot at 7:15 PM on Wednesdays, the series had no competition in the time-slot when it debuted, as there were no other television stations in Melbourne until 19 November 1956 when ABV-2 began broadcasting. On 21 November 1956 the series competed in its time-slot against ABV-2's broadcast of Miss Pilgrim's Progress, a 1950 British film. Later episodes competed against American music series Florian Zabach and later by American sitcom The Life of Riley.

It was preceded on HSV-7's schedule by a fifteen-minute newscast and followed by American series The Adventures of Rin Tin Tin.

== See also ==
- The Judy Jack Show - Australian-produced children's series which aired on HSV-7 from 1956 to 1957, also on Wednesdays
- Be My Guest - Also with Eric Pearce
