= Terry Scanlon =

Australian comedian

Terry Scanlon (5 July 1913 – 21 August 1996) was an Australian comedian and pantomime artist. He was one of Australia's top comedians; he worked with some of the early greats of Australian comedy, including Roy Rene and George Wallace. In the 1930s, however, he was one of the vanguards to modernise comedy out of baggy suits, funny face make up and slapstick into the more modern stand up style comedian - in a tailored suit, the only prop a cigarette in hand, delivering gags. His role in the evolution of Australian comedy was acknowledged in a tribute by Joe Martin when he was honoured as a life member of the "ECHINDAS" by his peers years later.

== Early life ==
Scanlon was born at the Salvation Army home, Mount Lawley, Western Australia. In 1918, he was formally and legally adopted by the midwife who had delivered him and taken care of him since he was 3 days old, Harriet, and her husband Maurice Scanlon. They lived in Charles St, West Perth. He started performing professionally at the age of 9, touring with YAL (Young Australia League), which also produced the talented Colin Croft and the internationally known Rolf Harris. Jack Cox, an English producer/director, taught Terry the basis of comic routines. Terry refined his craft through years of touring through West Australia, South Australia and Victoria during the 1930s.

Scanlon left school at the age of 13, and his elderly adoptive parents had died in 1928 while he was in his early teens. He had no family, but his burning ambition to become a comedian and perform in the east of Australia sustained him. He was still touring mainly around Perth and Fremantle at this time with William (Billy) R. Heaton. Scanlon began touring with Mrs Teague's Concert Party, performing in jails, hospitals, asylums and at Cottesloe beach, performing in the show "Sleepy Time Down South" while doubling as a waiter in a guest house. Still in his late teens, he continued learning his craft with great enthusiasm; touring with vaudeville shows, visually impaired shows, community concerts etc.

== Career ==
Doing diverse, but mainly comic performances, Scanlon also performed as a juggler, assistant in a dagger throwing club and did a stint in a tent show as a boxer. In those days, people had to be versatile. Comedy, however, was his true forte and on the advice of an act, Ted and Flo James, he was advised to go to the eastern states and get work in the theatres there. Many years later, Ted and Flo James became show business agents in Sydney, and Terry would get many bookings through them.

Terry decided to leave WA and in a T-model Ford he crossed the Nullarbor Plain. The car blew up during its long journey. He was now stuck in Adelaide, and South Australia was not appreciated by strangers from other states. As these were the depression years, they were having enough problems feeding their own. He kept performing wherever he could. Six months went by, and he decided to move on to Melbourne. A racing car driver was driving to Melbourne for a competition, and Terry was able to hitch a ride with him. He found work in Melbourne, including Sunday night performances at the Kings, Savoy, Princess and Apollo theatres. He worked with Ronny Shand, an acrobatic comic, as well as Jo Lawman and Stella Lamond. Scanlon remembered nursing Toni Lamond when she was a baby.

Scanlon was in his early 20s when he hit the big time. He started performing at the Melbourne Tivoli which marked the beginning of a 26-year relationship with the Tivoli circuit. The Tivoli was owned by a variety of people over the years. At the time Scanlon first performed at "The Tiv", the owner was an ex-actor, Frank Neil. After Neil was found murdered in South Melbourne, Wallace Parnell took charge (brother of the English Entrepreneur Val Parnell, who ran the London Palladium). Later still, David M. Martin took charge, whose son Lloyd Martin was to become the director of the Sydney Opera House. Scanlon had a lifetime contract with the entrepreneur Harry Wren, who booked him into theatres all over Australia, including the Cremorne-Brisbane, Tasmania and New Zealand.

A fellow performer related the story of when the power was cut during an ice show in New Zealand. With the impromptu spotlights provided by usherettes and their torches, Terry entertained the audience, telling gags for 1.5 hours non-stop until the power came back on. In all that time, he never once stooped to telling a dirty joke.

Scanlon also worked in nightclubs, including Sydney's "Sammy Lees" and "Jo Taylors." He performed pantomime. He was famous as "Buttons" in Cinderella. He did Vaudeville, variety and revue. He even played the pivotal part of Lord Fancourt Babberley in Charley's Aunt, staged by the Tivoli in Adelaide. During the 1950s, Terry toured England with the Empire Theatre circuit, working in Scotland and Ireland. He played the then famous Collins Music Hall in Islington, London, where he topped the bill and was the only Australian to do so. He also did six seasons at the racy Windmill Theatre.

Scanlon toured North Africa, Cyprus, Malta and Germany entertaining US troupes stationed there. He also performed in Bimbos, a famous nightclub in San Francisco and then left the US for more work in the UK. He also entertained the troupes in Vietnam. During that engagement, he performed with other artists, including Lucky Starr. Scanlon was awarded a certificate of appreciation from General William Westmoreland, the General of the United States Army, in 1967. He was a keen golfer and played on the famous St Andrews golf course in the UK. And when in the United States, played and met one of the all-time golf greats, Ben Hogan, on his own course in Fort Worth, Texas.

Scanlon had his own television show in the late 1960s, The Terry Scanlon Show, running on channel 9 in Melbourne. He also made guest appearances on the Stuart Wagstaff show there. He also had his own show in Sydney on Channel 7 and a guest appearance on The Bobby Limb Show on Channel 9. However, Scanlon preferred the warmth of live audiences. With the closure of the Tivoli and other live variety theatres due to the advent of television, RSL and other clubs were a source of work in the precarious world of show business. During the 1960s, Scanlon became very ill. He had glaucoma, heart problems and was diagnosed as manic-depressive.

Scanlon performed alongside artists such as Noël Coward, Dave Brubeck, Johnnie Ray, Mel Tourme, Howard Keel, Chico Marx, Tommy Trinder, Arthur Askie, Billy Daniels.

== Retirement and death ==
Scanlon retired from public life. He had lived in the eastern suburbs of Sydney for 35 years and in later life became a local identity around Bondi Beach. He died aged 83 years. He was buried at Waverley Cemetery; Geoff Bull led his musicians playing a traditional jazz funeral march.

== Works ==
Books which include Terry are:

- Curtain Call by Nancy Bridges
- Just call me Lucky by Lucky Grills
- Tivoli by Frank Van Straten
