= Missing Persons Unit =

- Genre: Police documentary
- Presented by: Mike Munro (2006–2008); Steve Bastoni (2009–2010)
- Country of origin: Australia
- Original language: English
- No. of seasons: 5

Production
- Executive producers: Ivo Burum; Peter Abbott
- Production locations: New South Wales, Australia
- Running time: 60 minutes (including commercials)

Original release
- Network: Nine Network
- Release: 7 February 2006 – 2010

Missing Persons Unit is an Australian television documentary series on the Nine Network hosted by actor and personality Steve Bastoni. The show documents people who have gone missing in Australia and the police who investigate their cases. The show was hosted for its first three years by Mike Munro before he moved to the Seven Network.

The program is produced by Sydney production company Freehand, executive producer for series 1–3 was Ivo Burum.

The first series of Missing Persons Unit screened from February 2006 as 30-minute episodes. The second series began airing in a 60-minute format from February 2008 and remained in that format with the third series airing from June 2009. It began airing on UK television in 2007.

== Synopsis ==
Missing Persons Unit is an observational documentary series that explores the world of the New South Wales Police MPU and the families of missing people.

Filmed at police stations, forensics labs, with families and on location with search and rescue, the program follows MPU operatives as they investigate cases and piece together the jigsaw that might lead to closure for a grief-stricken family.
