= Fun Farm =

- Genre: Children's television
- Presented by: Pat Mondel
- Country of origin: Australia
- Original language: English

Production
- Producer: Pat Mondel
- Production location: TCN-9 Willoughby, New South Wales

Original release
- Network: Nine Network
- Release: 29 October 1956 – April 1957

Fun Farm is an early Australian television series. It debuted on 29 October 1956, and was aired live on Nine Network Sydney station TCN-9.

Along with the likes of the Nine Network program Happy Show and the Seven Network programs Fun Fair (HSV-7),The Judy Jack Show (HSV-7), and Captain Fortune Show (ATN-7), and the ABC Children's TV Club, it represented an early example of Australian-produced children's television programming. Fun Farm ended in April 1957, at which point TCN-9 began another locally produced children series, Desmond and the Channel 9-Pins.

The series was aimed at children from ages four to twelve, compered and produced by Pat Mondel, who received more than 3000 letters from children during the first few weeks of the program.
