= The Isador Goodman Show =

- Genre: Variety
- Starring: Isador Goodman
- Country of origin: Australia
- Original language: English

Production
- Running time: 15 minutes

Original release
- Network: HSV-7
- Release: 6 November 1956 – September 1957

The Isador Goodman Show is an early Australian television variety series. The series debuted on 6 November 1956 and ran into early September 1957, aired on Melbourne station HSV-7 and starred pianist Isador Goodman, with some episodes also featuring a guest vocalist. The series is notable as an early attempt at producing an Australian-produced variety series. The live 15-minute show aired at 7:15PM on Tuesdays, was preceded by a 15-minute newscast and followed at 7:30PM by American series Jet Jackson. When the series debuted, television was still fairly new to Australia, with local series production having just started, and locally produced series often aired on just a single station.

In the episode broadcast 1 January 1957, Goodman was annoyed by two flies. He continued playing, doing his best to ignore them and to appear nonchalant. His numbers in the episode included Chopin Waltz, pop standard If I Love You and some boogie-woogie

Although kinescope recording existed when the series aired and was possibly seeing at least some use by station HSV-7, it is not known if any such recordings were made of the series, and if so, if any such recordings still exist.

== See also ==
- List of Australian music television shows
