= The Judy Jack Show =

- Genre: Children's
- Starring: Judy Jack
- Country of origin: Australia
- Original language: English

Production
- Running time: 30 minutes

Original release
- Network: HSV-7
- Release: 1956 – 1957

The Judy Jack Show is one of the earliest Australian television series, and is notable as one of the first children's series produced in that country. The series debuted in 1956 on Melbourne station HSV-7, and continued into 1957.

During the run of The Judy Jack Show, Judy Jack married journalist Trevor Dawson-Grove and took a fortnight off from presenting the series for her honeymoon.

== See also ==
- Fun Farm – First Australian-produced children's television series
