= TCN =

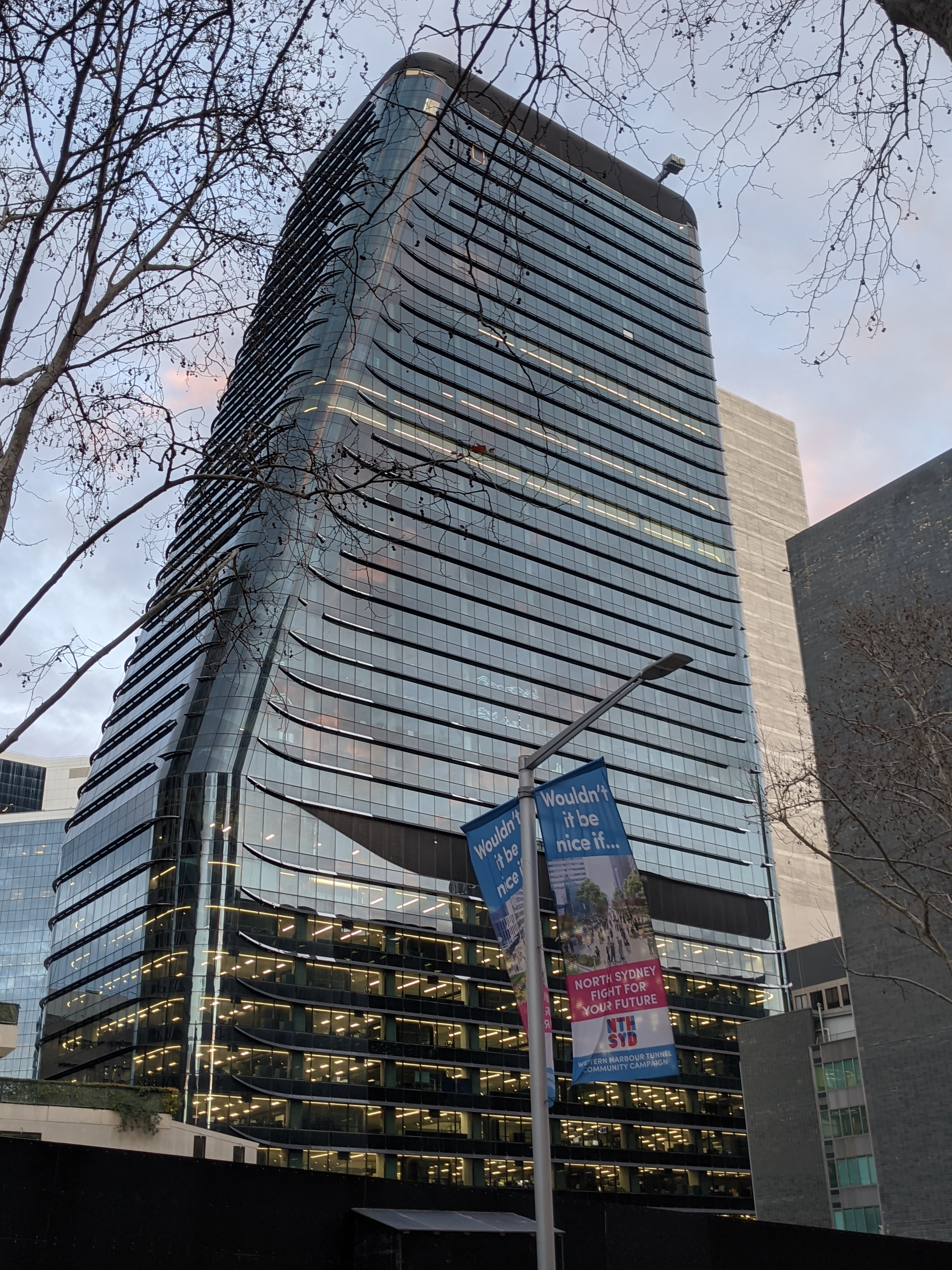
- Sydney, New South Wales; Australia
- City: Sydney
- Channels: Digital: 8 (VHF); Virtual: 9

Programming
- Language: English
- Network: Nine

Ownership
- Owner: Nine Entertainment; (TCN Channel Nine Pty Ltd)

History
- First air date: 16 September 1956
- Former channel number: Analog: 9 (VHF) (1956–2013)
- Former affiliations: Independent Television System (September 1956 – November 1956); Australian Television Network (1956–1963)
- Call sign meaning: Television Corporation New South Wales

Technical information
- Licensing authority: Australian Communications and Media Authority
- ERP: 200 kW (analog)^{a} 50 kW (digital)
- HAAT: 259 m (analog)^{a} 260 m (digital)
- Transmitter coordinates: 33°48′42″S 151°11′45″E

Links
- Website: 9now.com.au

TCN is the flagship television station of the Nine Network in Australia. The station is currently located at 1 Denison Street, North Sydney. The licence, issued to a company named Television Corporation Ltd headed by Frank Packer, was one of the first four licences (two in Sydney, two in Melbourne) to be issued for commercial television stations in Australia. TCN-9 is the home of the NRL coverage and national-level Nine News bulletins.

== History ==
TCN began broadcasting on 16 September 1956, and became the first television station in Australia to begin regular transmissions. Test broadcasts, initially consisting of a test slide and later documentaries and dramas, had commenced two months earlier on 13 July 1956. The first TV tower was built there at 24 Artarmon Road, Willoughby, in 1956 and rose 171 m (561 ft) in height, but was replaced by a taller one in 1965 which was the tallest lattice tower in Australia at 233 m (764 ft), and was operated by TXA Australia which operates another tower nearby at Artarmon.

The first words spoken on the station were by John Godson, who introduced the station audio-only, shortly before the first program, This Is Television, was introduced by Bruce Gyngell. As Godson's voice only was heard, Gyngell (who spoke and was seen) is regarded as the first person to "appear" on Australian television. Original footage of Gyngell's opening address is not believed to exist but it was re-created in 1959 to have a representation in the archives (albeit, not the real thing). Other early programming included the 1958 variety music program Bandstand which was launched by Brian Henderson. It lasted for 14 years on the station and launched the careers of many Australian performers.

In 1957, the station formed an affiliation with Melbourne station HSV-7, allowing them to share programming. In 1963, station affiliations changed; TCN-9 formed part of the National Television Network with GTV-9 in Melbourne, QTQ-9 in Brisbane and NWS-9 in Adelaide. These stations formed the basis of what is now the Nine Network, although only the Sydney and Melbourne stations were owned by the Packer-controlled company Nine Network Limited.

On Sir Frank Packer's death in 1974 ownership of Nine Network passed to his younger son Kerry Packer. Kerry's older brother Clyde Packer had been groomed to take over from their father but after a bitter split with his father circa 1972 he relinquished his role in the company and subsequently moved to the USA.

On 2 March 1981, the station began broadcasting at the Kingsgate Hyatt Tower (now Elan Building) on UHF channel 49, later moving to UHF channel 52 in February 1983 to allow for ABC and SBS to set up transmitters there. This transmitter was installed to cover areas of central Sydney where reception is affected by the ghosting caused by the high-rise buildings in Sydney's central business district.

In January 1987, Kerry Packer sold the Sydney and Melbourne stations to Alan Bond's Bond Media for $1.055 billion, including $200 million in shares of Bond Media. Bond already owned the Perth and Brisbane Nine affiliate stations (among others). In 1990, Bond Media's inability to pay out preference shares to Packer forced Nine into receivership. In July 1990, Packer bought back the expanded Nine Network (Sydney, Melbourne and Brisbane) for only $200 million, one-fifth of what he sold it for. Perth was not included due to Bond selling it to Sunraysia Television before Packer buying back the company.

In 1994, Packer's print operations (owned by Australian Consolidated Press) and the Nine Network were merged into one new company, Publishing and Broadcasting Limited (PBL). On 1 October 1997, TCN-9 performed the first on-air trial of digital broadcasting in the southern hemisphere.

TCN commenced digital television transmission on 1 January 2001, broadcasting on VHF Channel 8 while maintaining analogue transmission on VHF Channel 9. The analogue signal for TCN was shut off at 9.00am AEDST, Tuesday, 3 December 2013.

In 2014 and 2015, TCN produced both Inside Story and The Verdict for the Nine Network, hosted by Leila McKinnon and Karl Stefanovic respectively. The Verdict did not build a solid audience and as expected the program was axed in 2016.

In January 2017, following the affiliation formed between Nine and Southern Cross in 2016, the station became home to the new Nine News Canberra and Southern NSW bulletins. The bulletins were anchored by Vanessa O'Hanlon.

In late 2018, It was announced that after 25 years on air, the Nine Network axed and retired The NRL Footy Show, bringing to an end 25 years of live primetime variety from the station.

It was also announced to public and then staff, that after 64 years in Willoughby, TCN would move to North Sydney. This move occurred in stages throughout the second half of 2020. The final broadcast of Sydney’s Nine News from Willoughby, took place on Friday 20 November 2020. The final broadcast from Willoughby was Weekend Today on Saturday 21 November 2020, with Nine News commencing at North Sydney that evening.

== Production ==
=== Filmed at North Sydney ===
==== Studio A: Lifestyle and Entertainment ====
- 100% Footy (2021–present)
- Nine's Sports Coverage Including National Rugby League, Wimbledon tennis, Super Rugby AU and Australian Open coverage (2021–present)
- Sports Sunday (2021–present)
- The Sunday Footy Show (NRL) (2021–present)
- Today (various segments) (2021–present)
- Today Extra (various segments) (2021–present)

==== Studio B: 9News Sydney ====
- A Current Affair (2021–present)
- 9News Sydney statewide (Except Northern NSW) (2020–present)
- 60 Minutes (2020–present)
- Today (2020–present)
- Today Extra (2020–present)
- Weekend Today (2020–present)
- 9News Morning (2020–present)
- 9News Afternoon Sydney (2020–present)
- 9News Late (Sundays only, 2020–present)
- Sports Sunday (February 2021 – March 2021) (Now presented from Studio A since March 2021)
- The Sunday Footy Show (2020–present) (Now presented from Studio A since March 2021)
- 100% Footy (2020–present) (Now presented from Studio A since March 2021)

==== Studio C: Secondary/back-up news studio ====
- 9News Early (2020–present)

==== Studio D ====
- Nine Digital and Nine Publishing segments (2020–present)

==== Studio E ====
- 9Honey Segments (2021–present)

=== Filmed at Willoughby ===
==== Studio 1:9News Sydney ====
- 9News Sydney statewide (1956–2020)
- 60 Minutes (1979–2020)
- Today (1982–2012)
- Weekend Today (2009–2012)
- 9News Morning (2012–2016)
- A Current Affair (2012–2016)
- 9News Late (Sundays only, 2020)

==== Studio 2: Lifestyle and Entertainment ====
Weekdays:

- 9News Sydney statewide (2020)
- Today (2020)
- Today Extra (2020)
- 9News Morning (2020)
- 9News Afternoon (2020)
- 9News Late (Sundays only, 2020)
- Inside Story (2014–2015)
- The Mike Walsh Show (1977-1984)
- The Mike Walsh At Night Show 1985

Weekends:

- Weekend Today (2012–2020)
- The Sunday Footy Show (1992–2020)
- Sports Sunday (2017–2020)
- 100% Footy (2018–2020)
- Nine's Wide World of Sports (1981–1999, 2008–2016)

==== Studio 24: Secondary/back-up news studio ====
- Nine News updates (2014–2020)
- 60 Minutes (2020)
- Nine News Southern NSW and ACT (2017–2020)
- A Current Affair (2012)
- Today news updates during OB (2014)

==== Studio 3: National Newsroom ====
- Nine's Early Morning News (2009–2020)
- Today Extra (2016–2020)
- A Current Affair (2016–2020)

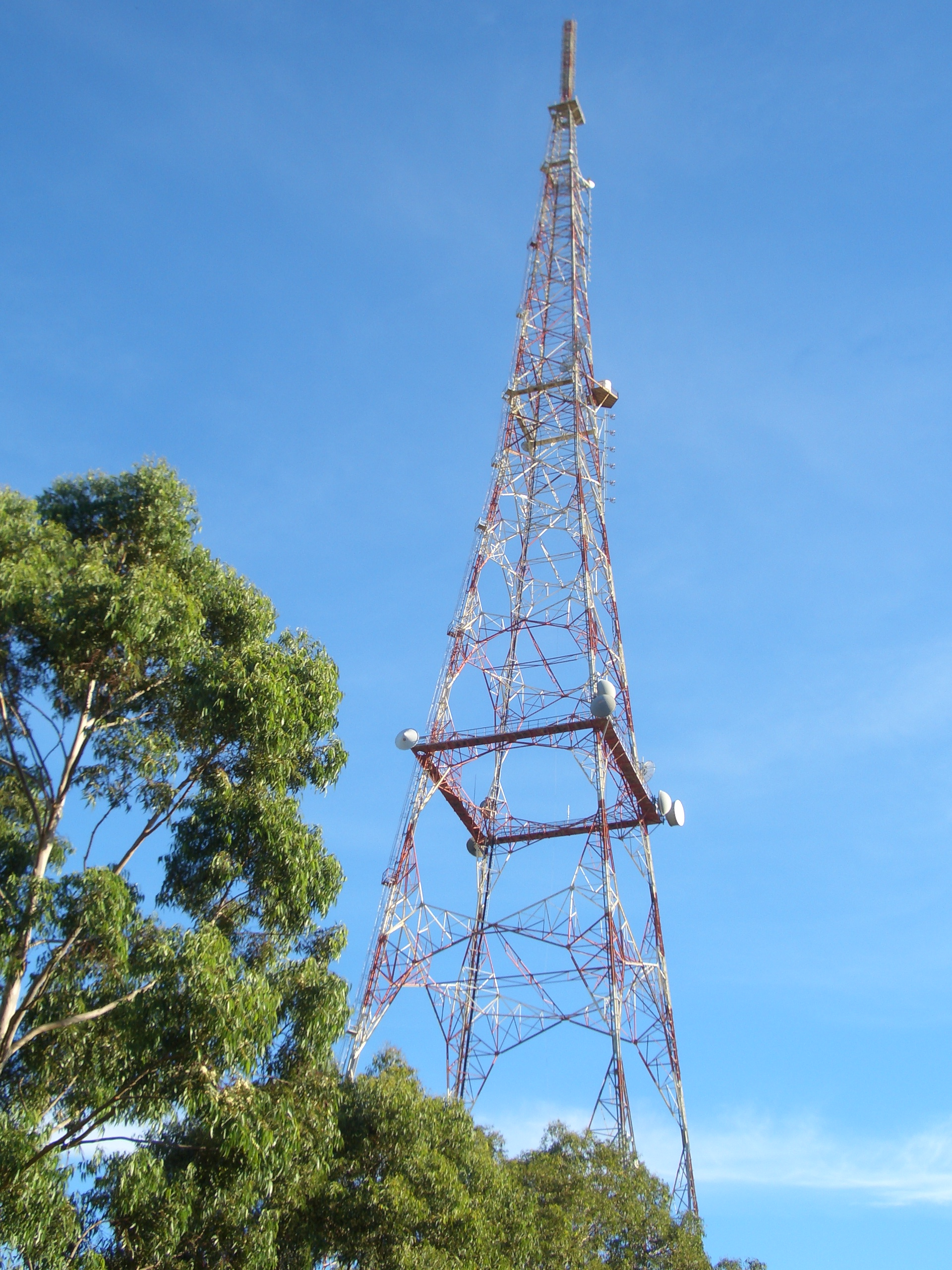
TCN 9 Tower at Willoughby

==== Filmed at Fox Studios Australia ====
- William & Sparkles' Magical Tales (2010–2016)
- Surprises! (2012–2014)
- Kitchen Whiz (2011–2015)
- Move It (2013–2018)

==== Location ====
- Getaway (1992–present)
- ARIA Awards (2011–2013, 2017–present)
- NRL coverage
- Australian Open coverage (2019–present)

=== Past ===
- Love Island Australia Afterparty (2021)
- Nine News Southern NSW and ACT (2017–2021) replaced by WIN News from July 2021.
- Your Domain (2019–2020)
- Schools Spectacular (2013–2016)
- Financial Review Sunday (2013–2014)
- Nine News at 7.00 (2013, on 9Gem)
- Kerri-Anne (entitled Mornings With Kerri-Anne) (2002–2011)
- Here's Humphrey (1965–2008)
- Hi-5 (1999–2011)
- Hi-5 USA (2003–2006)
- Cushion Kids (2001) (From the creators of Hi-5)
- New MacDonald's Farm (2004–2008)
- Nightline (1992–2008, 2009–2010)
- Nine News Sunday AM Edition (2008–2009)
- Things To Try Before You Die (2007)
- The Chopping Block (2008)
- Domestic Blitz (2008–2010)
- The Music Jungle (2007–2008)
- The Sunday Roast (2004–2007)
- Your Business Success (2004–2007)
- Sunday (1981–2008)
- A Current Affair (1988–2008, production moved to Melbourne) (2012–present)
- Accent on Strings (1956)
- Accent on Youth (1958)
- Adventures of the Little Koala (1990)
- Australia's Amateur Hour (1957–1958)
- Body Work (2005)
- Boots N' All (2001–2005)
- Campfire Favourites (1956)
- Counterpoints (1958)
- Fresh Cooking (2001–2009)
- Burke's Backyard (1987–2004)
- Burgo's Catch Phrase (1997–2003)
- Eric Baume's Viewpoint (1959–1961)
- Eunice Gardiner Presents (1958)
- Flat Chat (2001)
- Fun Farm (1956–1957)
- The George Wallace Show (1960)
- Happy Go Lucky (1961)
- The Home Show (1956–1957)
- The Johnny O'Connor Show (1956)
- Joe Martin's Late Show (1959)
- The Lucky Show (1959–1961)
- The Midday Show (1973–1998)
- The Footy Show (NRL) (1994–2018)
- The Verdict (2015–2016)
- Music for You (1958–1960)
- My Two Wives (1993)
- The N.R.M.A Show (1957)
- Outback Jack (2004–2005)
- Rendezvous at Romano's (1957)
- The Block (2003–2004, 2013 – All Stars edition), production moved to GTV
- The Sullivans (1976–1983)
- Say It with Music (1957–1958)
- Skating on Thin Ice (2005)
- So Fresh (2002–2006)
- Super Flying Fun Show (1970–1980)
- This Afternoon (2009)
- This Is Your Life (1995–2005), production moved to GTV
- Torvill and Dean's Dancing on Ice (2006)
- Town Talk (1957)
- TV Disc Jockey (1957–1958)
- Water Rats (1996–2001)
- What's My Line (1956–1958)
- Wide World of Sports (1981–1999)
- The World of Glamour (1964–1965)
- The Young Doctors (1976–1983)
- The Paul Hogan Show (1973–1984)
- Comedy Inc. (parts) (2003–2007)
- 9StreamLIVE (2013)
- Nine News Now (2013–2019)
- Australian Ninja Warrior (2017–2022)
- Super Netball coverage (2017–2021)

== News ==
9News Sydney is TCN's flagship nightly news bulletin presented by Peter Overton from Sunday to Thursday and Mark Burrows on Friday and Saturday. Sport is presented by James Bracey from Sunday to Thursday and Zac Bailey on Friday and Saturday. Weather is presented by Sophie Walsh from Sunday to Thursday and Belinda Russell on Friday and Saturday.

Jayne Azzopardi and Mark Burrows are the fill-in news presenters, with Matt Burke as the fill-in sport presenters, and Airlie Walsh, Kate Creedon, Sophie Walsh and Zara James are the fill-in weather presenters.

Brian Henderson was Nine's Sydney news presenter for a record 45 years - including 38 years presenting on weeknights. Retiring in November 2002, Henderson was succeeded as weeknight presenter by Jim Waley, who was at the time host of the Sunday program and was one of Nine's most experienced presenters.

In January 2005, despite some considerable ratings success, Waley was replaced as weeknight presenter by Mark Ferguson, who was previously the weekend presenter. Ferguson's successor as weekend presenter Mike Munro resigned in 2008 and was replaced by Michael Usher.

In 2009, following a continuing run of poor ratings, Ferguson was demoted to his former role as weekend news presenter, with Peter Overton taking over as news presenter on weeknights. Later in the year, Ferguson was removed from the presenting duties on the Sydney bulletins after announcing his decision to move to the Seven Network, but he didn't move to Seven until he trialled the hosting duties on Nine's Afternoon News only appearing on-air up until his departure on 25 September 2009.

Deborah Knight was appointed as Friday and Saturday presenter with Peter Overton now also presenting the Sunday bulletin.

In 2011, Nine News Sydney officially overtook Seven News Sydney in the ratings for the first time in seven years, winning 26 weeks to Seven's 14 weeks.

In November 2025, it was announced that Amber Sherlock had been made redundant, one of several on air faces impacted by job cuts across Broadcast and Streaming Divisions.

In June 2026, Mark Burrows was appointed Friday and Saturday presenter, replacing Georgie Gardner.

== Current presenters ==
=== News presenters ===
- Peter Overton (Sunday – Thursday)
- Mark Burrows (Friday and Saturday)

=== Sport presenters ===
- James Bracey (Sunday – Thursday)
- Zac Bailey (Friday and Saturday)

=== Weather presenters ===
- Sophie Walsh (Sunday – Thursday)
- Belinda Russell (Friday and Saturday)

Fill-in presenters

- Mark Burrows (news)
- Jayne Azzopardi (news)
- Matt Burke (sport)
- Belinda Russell (weather)
- Sophie Walsh (weather)
- Kate Creedon (weather)
- Maggie Raworth (weather)

=== Reporters ===
- Charles Croucher (Political editor)
- Andrew Probyn (National affairs editor)
- Chris Kohler (Finance editor)
- Effie Zahos (Money editor)
- Liz Daniels (State political reporter)
- Claudia Vrdoljak (Federal politics reporter)
- Amanda Copp (Federal politics reporter)
- Hannah Sinclair (Europe correspondent)
- Lauren Tomasi (US correspondent)
- Reid Butler (US correspondent)
- Mark Burrows (senior reporter)
- Damian Ryan (senior reporter)
- Eddy Meyer (senior reporter)
- Airlie Walsh (senior reporter)
- Sophie Upcroft (State political reporter)
- Annalise Bolt (court reporter)
- Emma Partridge (Senior crime editor)
- Gabriella Rogers (Medical reporter)
- Mike Dalton (Special features reporter)
- Vicky Jardim (senior reporter)
- Kate Creedon (reporter)
- Sophie Walsh (reporter)
- Ruth Wynn-Williams (reporter)
- Hayley Francis (reporter)
- Elizabeth Bryan (reporter)
- Zara James (reporter)
- James Wilson (reporter)
- Massilia Aili (reporter)
- Alex Heinke (reporter)
- Maddison Scott (reporter)
- Erin Ramsey (reporter)
- Danny Weidler (Chief rugby league reporter)
- Danika Mason (Sport reporter)
- Emma Lawrence (Sport reporter)
- Zac Bailey (Sport reporter)
- Samuel Djodan (Cricket reporter)
- Luke Dufficy (Sport reporter)
- Tom Marriott (Sport reporter)
- Simon Bouda (A Current Affair crime editor)
- Lizzie Pearl (A Current Affair Sydney reporter)
- Steve Marshall (A Current Affair Sydney reporter)
- Nat Wallace (A Current Affair Sydney reporter)
- Maggie Raworth (A Current Affair Sydney reporter)
- Gabrielle Boyle (Today Sydney reporter)
- Lara Vella (Today Sydney reporter)
- Sarah Stewart (Today Sydney reporter)
- Jack Hahn (Today Sydney reporter)

=== Past presenters ===
- Chuck Faulkner (1956–1964)
- Brian Henderson (1964–2002)
- Mike Munro (January 2005 – October 2008)
- Ian Ross (1980s–2001)
- Jim Waley (1980s–2005)
- Mark Ferguson (January 2005 – January 2009)
- Mike Walsh (entertainment host 1977 - 1985)
- Georgie Gardner (July 2009 – December 2017, January 2020 – April 2026)

== See also ==
- Television broadcasting in Australia

== Notes ==
a.Analog transmissions were shut down on 3 December 2013.
