= Willoughby, New South Wales =

Willoughby
- Suburb
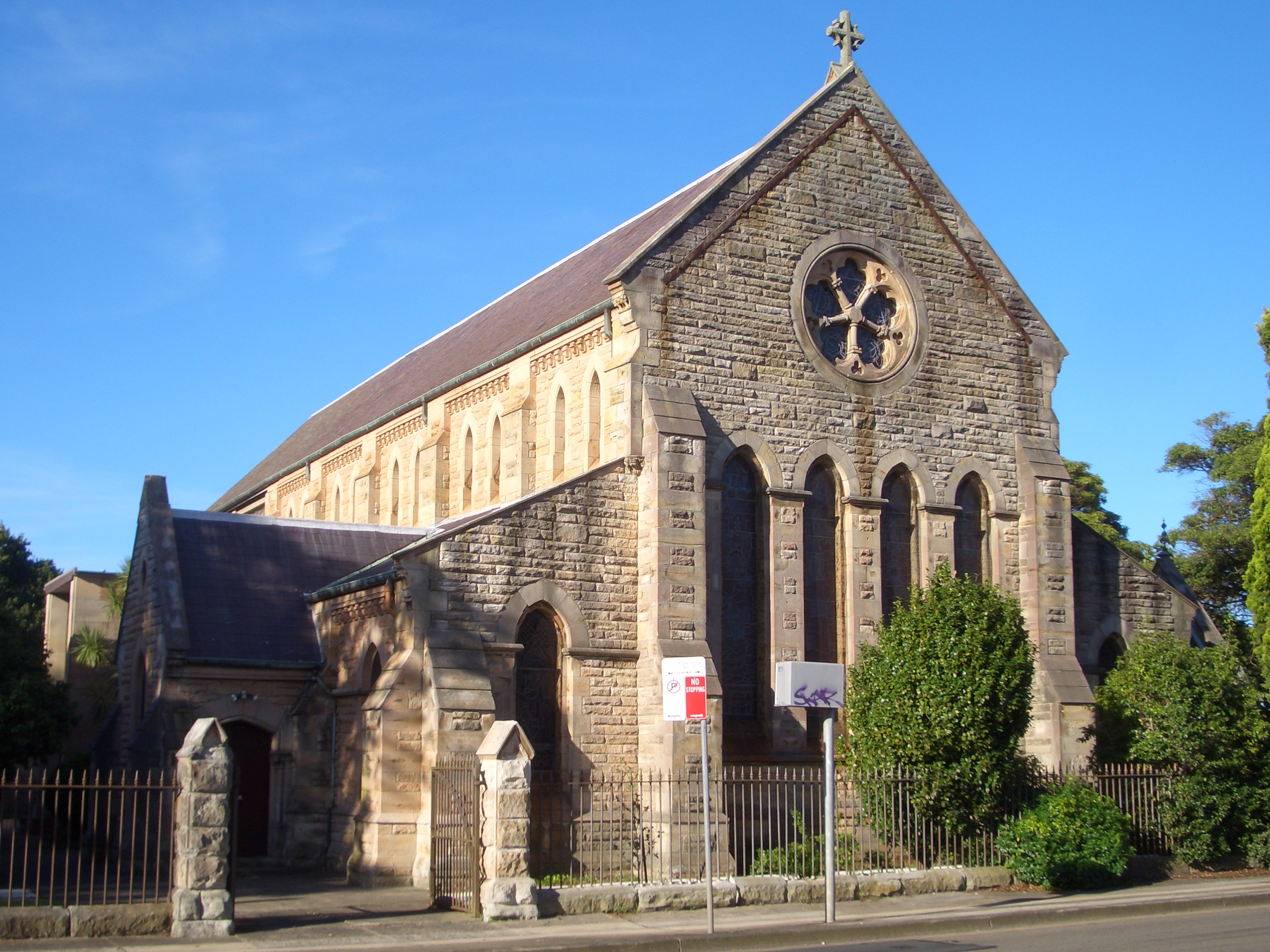
- St Stephens Anglican Church

- Interactive map of Willoughby
- Country: Australia
- State: New South Wales
- City: Sydney
- LGA: City of Willoughby
- Location: 8 km (5.0 mi) north of Sydney CBD
- Established: 1850s

Government
  - State electorate: Willoughby
  - Federal division: Bradfield

Area
  - Total: 3.22 km^{2} (1.24 sq mi)
- Elevation: 97 m (318 ft)

Population
  - Total: 7,124 (2021 census)
  - Density: 2,212/km^{2} (5,730/sq mi)
- Postcode: 2068
Suburbs around Willoughby
Chatswood	North Willoughby	Middle Cove
Chatswood	Willoughby	Castlecrag
Artarmon	Naremburn	Northbridge

Willoughby is a suburb located on the lower North Shore of Sydney, in the state of New South Wales, Australia 8 kilometres (5 mi) north of the Sydney central business district, in the local government area of the City of Willoughby.

The City of Willoughby takes its name from the suburb but its administrative centre is located in the adjacent suburb of Chatswood, which is the local area's major commercial centre.

== History ==
=== European settlement ===
There is some conjecture as to how Willoughby was named. Some historians believe it was named after a parish, while others believe that Surveyor-General Sir Thomas Mitchell decided to commemorate Sir James Willoughby Gordon whom he had served during the Peninsular War and was the quartermaster-general in England when the First Fleet sailed to Botany Bay.

Captain Arthur Phillip's search for "good land, well watered" led to the discovery and colonisation of the rough shores of Roseville Chase, where Samuel Bates built a farm at Echo Point.

Later developments included the building of the first post office in 1871 and the construction of Pommy Lodge in the same year. The latter—a small sandstone building in Penshurst Street—was originally the Congregational Church, which later changed premises. Laurel Bank Cottage, a single-storey home, was constructed in Penshurst Street in 1884. The cottage is now owned and run by the local Masonic Lodge as a function and conference facility.

Circa 1920, Telford Lane—between Fourth Avenue and Eastern Valley Way—was created and paved; the method used was the one pioneered by Thomas Telford in England in the nineteenth century. This lane is one of the few surviving examples of the Telford method in Sydney.

In 1934, the Willoughby incinerator was built in Small Street, after a design by Walter Burley Griffin. It has been described as "a particularly successful example of an industrial building integrating function with site." Like Telford Lane, the incinerator is listed on the (now defunct) Register of the National Estate.

The suburb was home to the headquarters of the Nine Network, under the callsign of TCN-9 for 64 years until it moved to North Sydney in November 2020. Next to this site was the Channel 9 TV Tower which at 233 metres (764 ft) high was the tallest in Australia; its demolition commenced in April 2021, to be replaced by 460 new homes.

== Heritage listings ==
Willoughby has a number of heritage-listed sites, including:

- 85–87 Penshurst Street: Laurelbank
- 2 Small Street: Walter Burley Griffin Incinerator, Willoughby

== Commercial area ==
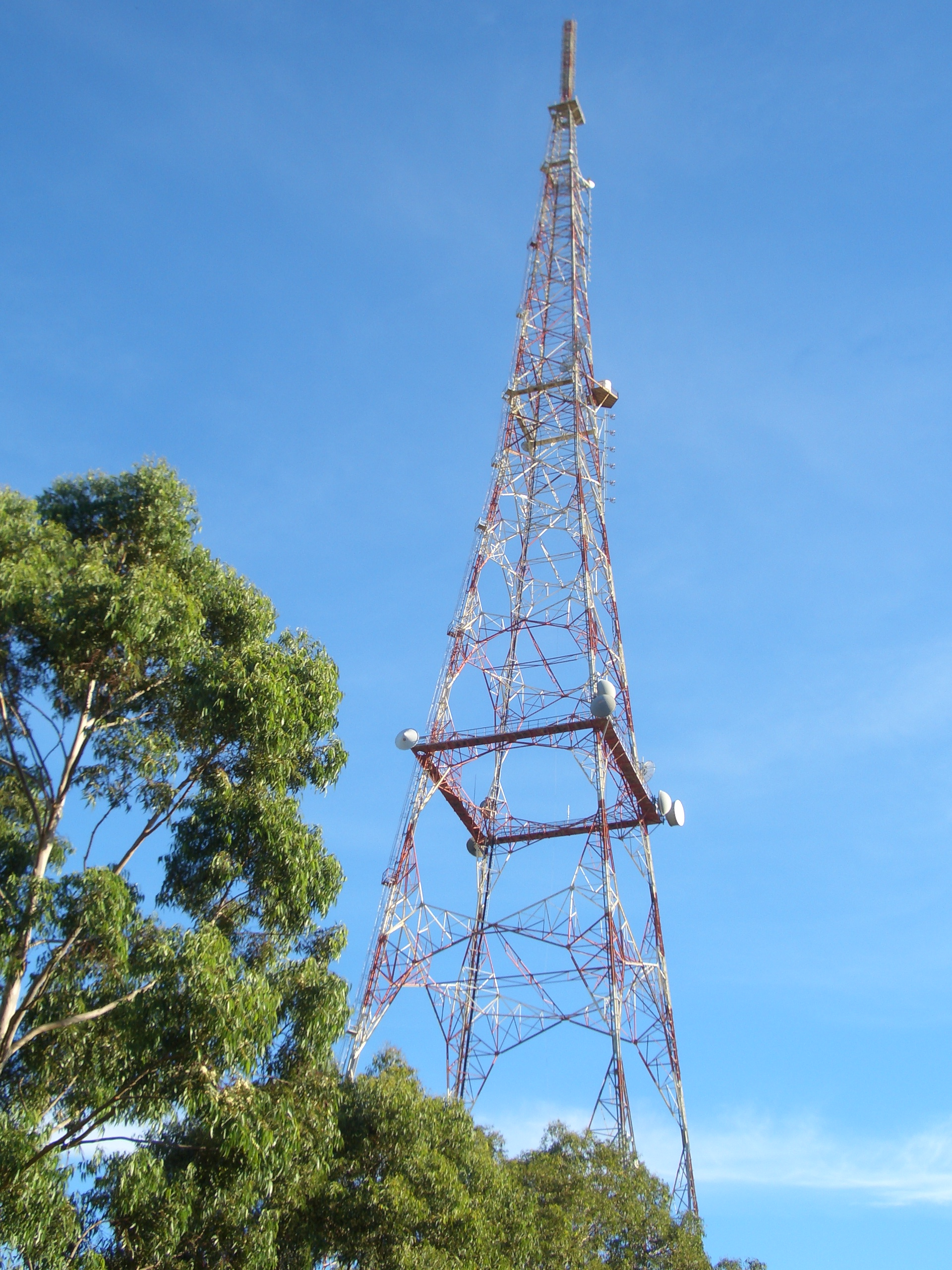
TCN-9 TXA TV tower

Willoughby has a number of small shops, restaurants and hotels. There are several small groupings of shops, the majority of which are on Mowbray Road, Willoughby Road, Penshurst Street and High Street.

== Parks and recreation ==
Bicentennial Reserve which includes Hallstrom Park, features a soccer field, T Ball & softball fields and a children's playground. Willoughby Leisure Centre features a 25m lap pool, spas, children's pool, swim school, gym, basketball courts, netball courts and baseball field. Flat Rock Gully, built on an old rubbish tip, is bushland with two walking tracks to Long Bay, following the creek line.

- Carlson Park
- Julian St Park
- Willoughby Squash courts
- Hallstrom Park
- Willoughby Park

== Transport ==
Artarmon is the nearest station for Willoughby's residents, on the western border of the suburb. Also, a number of bus routes cover the area. It is close to St Leonards and Chatswood stations. The Gore Hill Freeway, a major arterial route into the Sydney CBD, runs along the southern border of Willoughby, with exit from the freeway from Reserve Road and entry from Reserve Road and Willoughby Road.

Bus Routes serving Willoughby include:

- 115 Chatswood – North Sydney via Crows Nest
- 120 Chatswood – Queen Victoria Building via Warringah Freeway
- 205 East Willoughby – City Bridge St via Warringah Freeway
- 267 Chatswood – Greenwich Point via Crows Nest

Busways' Willoughby Bus Depot is located in Willoughby East.

== Schools ==
- Willoughby Public School (K – Year 6)
- Willoughby Girls High School (Year 7 – Year 12, girls only)
- St Thomas' Catholic Primary School (K – Year 6, Catholic School)

== Amenities ==
- Willoughby Fire Station, Laurel Street
- 1st Willoughby Scouts, Laurel Street
- Bridgeview Hotel, Willoughby Road
- The Willoughby Hotel, Penshurst Street

== Churches ==
- Armenian Evangelical Church
- St Stephen's Anglican Church
- St Thomas's Catholic Church
- Willoughby Uniting Church
- Willoughby Presbyterian Church

== Population ==
Historical population
Year	Pop.	±%
2001	5,391	—
2006	5,411	+0.4%
2011	5,921	+9.4%
2016	6,540	+10.5%
2021	7,124	+8.9%

In the 2021 Census, there were 7,124 people in Willoughby. 62.1% of people were born in Australia. The next most common countries of birth were China (without SARs and Taiwan) 4.6%, England 4.4%, Hong Kong 2.5%, New Zealand 2.0% and South Africa 1.3%. 68.7% of people only spoke English at home. Other languages spoken at home included Mandarin 5.9%, Cantonese 4.6%, Armenian 2.0%, Japanese 1.8% and Croatian 1.1%. The most common responses for religion were No Religion 39.8%, Catholic 25.5%, Anglican 11.4% and Eastern Orthodox 3.0%.

Willoughby is known for a large Armenian community, who arrived in the area in the 1960s-1970s. More Armenian families made their home there once an Armenian Apostolic Church was built on Macquarie Street, Chatswood, close to the border with Willoughby. Willoughby contains several Armenian Churches and Community Centres (Cultural Clubs). It is home to the first Armenian Saturday School which still operates on Saturdays at Willoughby Girls High.The Armenian-speaking population of Willoughby makes up 1.2% of the total Armenian-speaking population of Australia, although the population of Willoughby makes up less than 0.05% of the total population of Australia.

== Notable residents ==
- John Davies, gold medal-winning Olympic swimmer for Australia in the 1952 Summer Olympics
- Alan A. Freeman, English record producer, was living on Mowbray Road in 1969
- Evonne Goolagong, tennis player
- Doc Neeson, lead singer of The Angels
- Matthew Reilly, best-selling author

== Gallery ==
=== Heritage ===
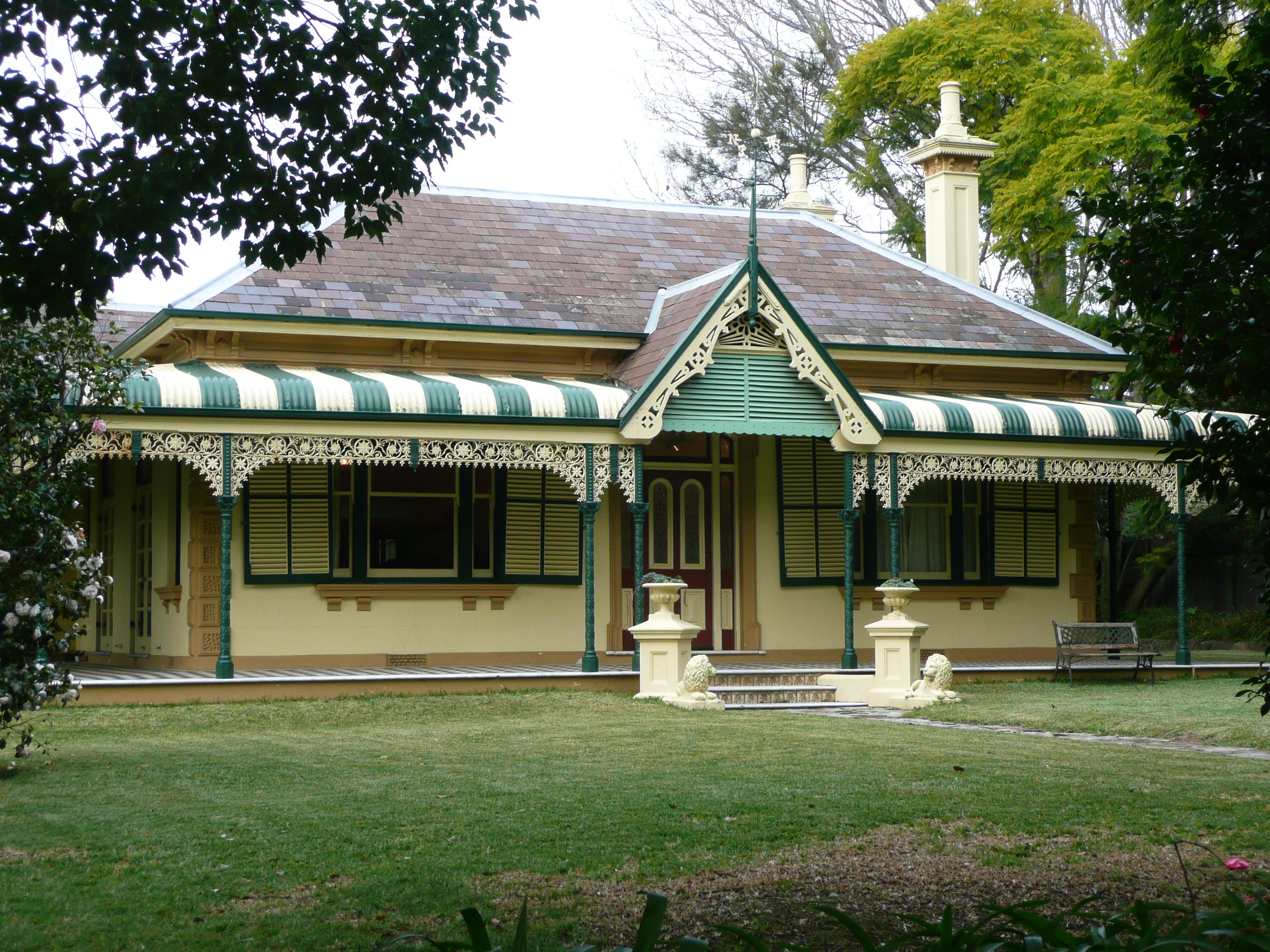
Laurel Bank Cottage (1884)

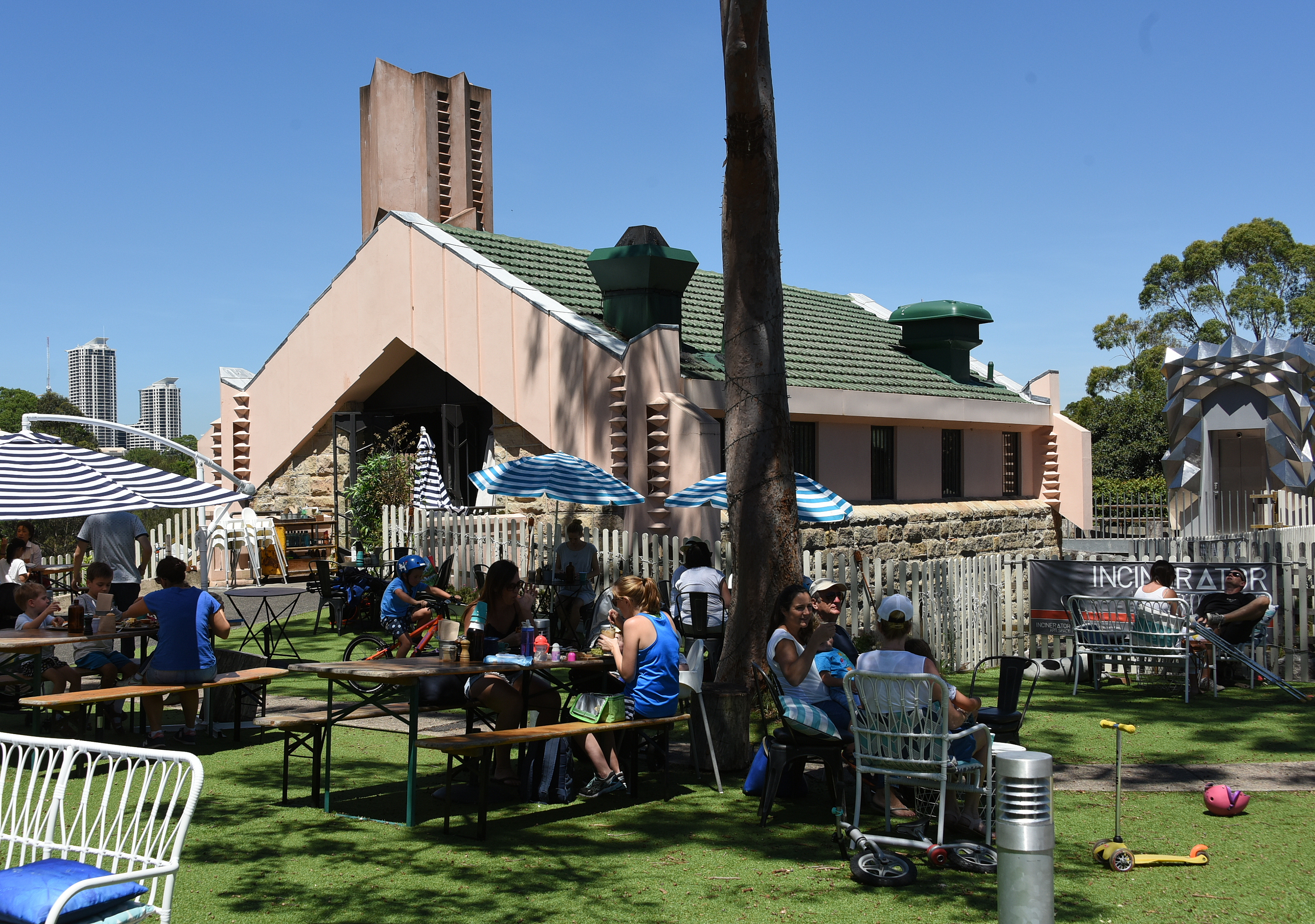
Incinerator designed by Walter Burley Griffin (1934)

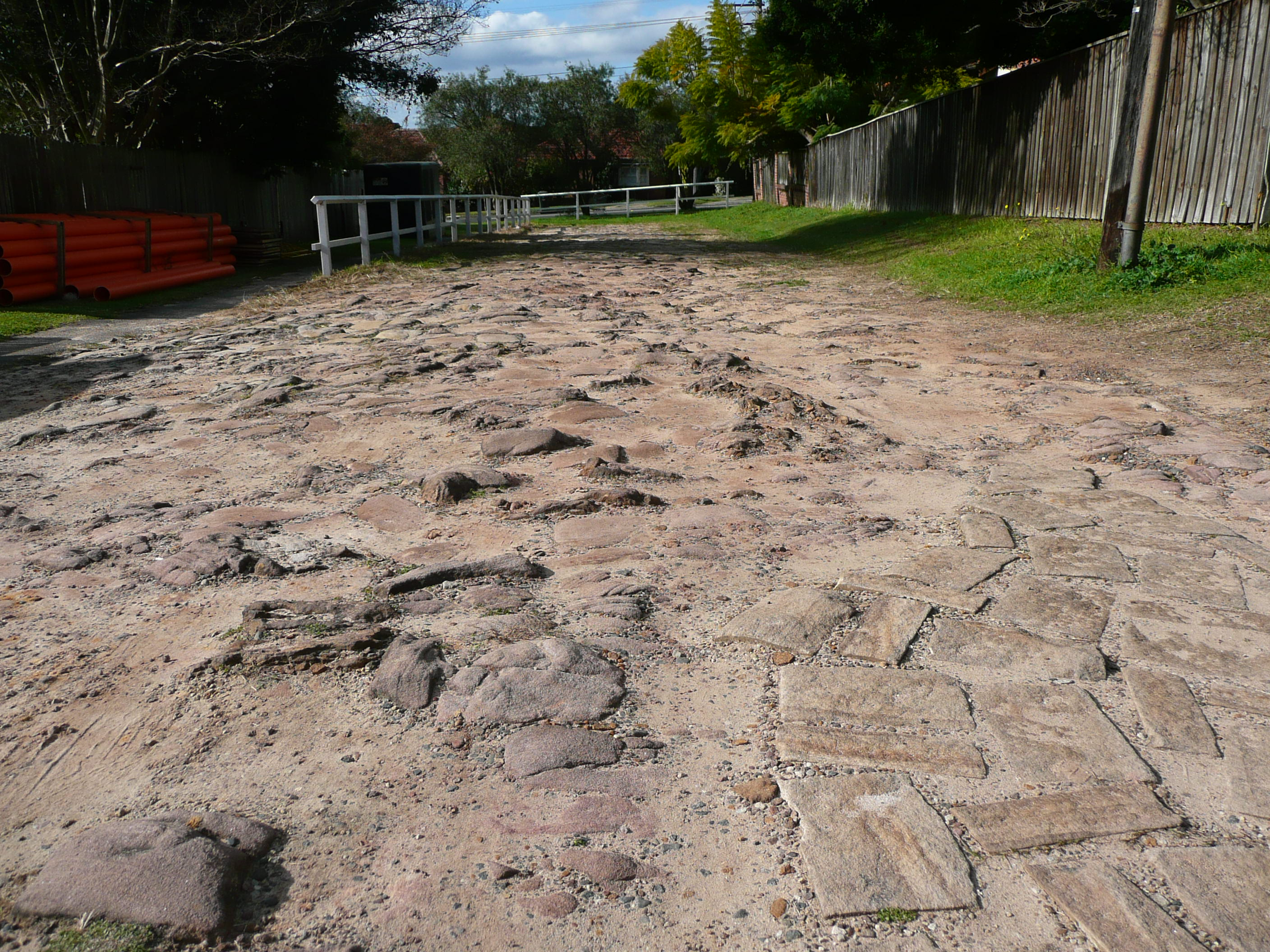
Telford Lane (c.1920)

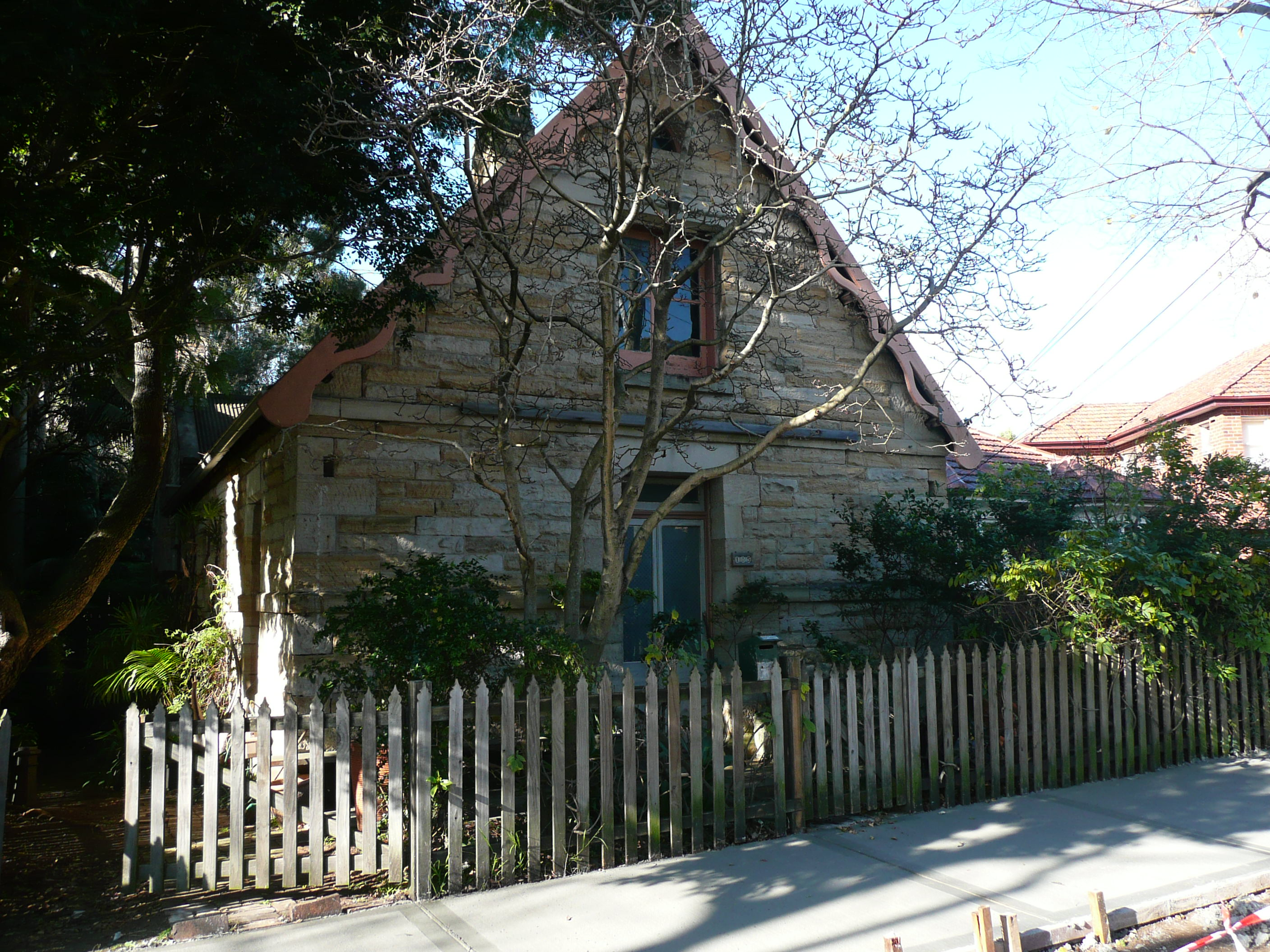
Pommy Lodge (1871)
