= John Pinder (comedy producer) =

New Zealand-Australian comedy producer

John Pinder (January 1945 – 26 May 2015) was a New Zealand-born Australian comedy producer, promoter, and festival director based in Melbourne for most of his career. He produced band performances and ran live venues, being especially known for the comedy theatre cafes Flying Trapeze and The Last Laugh. He also co-founded the contemporary circus company Circus Oz in 1977, and the Melbourne International Comedy Festival in 1987.

== Early life and education ==
John Pinder was born in January 1945 in New Zealand, and spent his formative years in Dunedin, where there was much theatre and other live shows. His parents would take him to the theatre and musicals, and the whole family tuned in to The Goon Show on radio on Sunday nights. In addition, the family lived next door to a plot where Bullens Circus and Ashtons Circus regularly performed – so all of these factors were early influences.

He trained as a teacher of fine arts in Dunedin, and during his late teens, saw many productions by the Dunedin Repertory Society. They had a workshop and free access to much of J. C. Williamson's work. At university, Pinder got "roped in" to designing sets, and did some work on a production for the teachers college.

== Career ==
=== 1960s ===
In the 1960s, Pinder worked behind the scenes in at least two productions in Dunedin, New Zealand by the Dunedin Repertory Society: Breath of Spring (1963) and Harold Pinter's The Caretaker (1965). After doing some set design and backstage work with various productions in several towns in New Zealand, Pinder "drifted into" journalism and theatre reviewing.

Pinder moved to Australia and worked as a journalist for the Australian Broadcasting Corporation (ABC) for around five years, first in Sydney and then Melbourne. He was still working for the ABC when he produced his first concert/show and the first lightshow concert in Melbourne, "The Electric Blues Thing" featuring Doug Parkinson in Focus, The Semblence of Dignity, with Ellis D Fogg's providing the "psychedelic lightshow", at the Carlton Cinema in 1968.

By the late 1960s Pinder got into promoting rock concerts. He joined a band management company called Let It Be, inspired by the Beatles' song of the same name. The company, led by Michael Chugg, managed Australian bands like Daddy Cool and Spectrum. From 1970, Pinder and Bani McSpedden, along with Peter Andrew and Roxie from Let It Be and in collaboration with artist Warren Knight, and McSpedden's brother Hugh, a lighting expert, promoted T. F. Much Ballroom (and its successors the Much More Ballroom and Stoned Again) as a live venue. The venue was actually the Cathedral Hall or Central Hall in Fitzroy, allocated the Ballroom names when hired out as a music venue. It became was Melbourne's leading event arts and music venues of the early 1970s, with events usually held monthly. The events included multiple musical acts, with stand-up comedy, poetry readings, theatrical, dance, and novelty performances in between. Australian Performing Group (APG) performed sketches, and performers like the jug band Matchbox, Daddy Cool, and Circus Oz performed there. The Edison Light Show, operated by Hugh McSpedden, became part of the attraction. Circus Oz was co-founded by Pinder, the result of a collaboration between Adelaide group New Circus and Melbourne's Soapbox Circus. Events at the Much More Ballroom ended in December 1972, apparently because of complaints from St Patrick's Cathedral (who owned the hall) about the types of music and the use of drugs.

At this time, Pinder was putting a lot of effort into the production of the shows (around 12–15 a year), which had increasing amounts of comedy in them, as well as working for radio stations. He also put on large-scale shows at the Sidney Myer Music Bowl, including Billy Thorpe, who attracted an audience of around 200,000.

=== 1970s-1980s ===
After spending some time in Europe, he returned to Melbourne and worked for a construction company which planned to build an arts and shopping complex. Although this did not materialise, Pinder was sold on the idea of creating a theatre cafe. In 1973 Pinder established the Flying Trapeze (Note: The article in the 1978 issue of Theatre Australia spells it "trapeeze", but after extensive searching think that this must be a simple spelling error. Confirmed by this photo on Facebook.) Cafe in Brunswick Street (also known as "the fly trap") in what had been a Yugoslav cafe, with rent of A$25 per week. This may have been the first comedy venue in Australia, and was the start of the comedy boom. Comedians such as Rod Quantock, Mary Keneally, and Alan Pentland did some of their first gigs there, but Pinder could only afford to pay more than A$10 and a hat was handed around for audience contributions. He sold The Flying Trapeze after around two and a half years.

In 1974 he ran the Reefer Cabaret, first in Dallas Brooks Hall in East Melbourne, which had been built by the local chapter of Freemasons. Reefer Cabaret also featured long concerts, which included several musical acts, along with comedy, poetry readings, and various theatrical, dance, or novelty shows. The first event took place on 3 August 1974, and featured The Dingoes, Skyhooks, and other bands. After complaints from the Freemasons, Roberts moved the Reefer Cabaret to the Ormond Hall in Prahran, owned by the Blind Institute of Melbourne. The monthly concerts included such acts as Madder Lake, Ayers Rock, Split Enz, the Renee Geyer Band and Ariel, and continued until sometime in 1976. Mushroom Records recorded the final concerts and released a compilation double album, A-Reefer-Derci (1976), which included tracks by Ariel, Ayers Rock, the Captain Matchbox Whoopee Band, the Renee Geyer Band, Skyhooks, and Split Enz. Another outcome of the Cabaret was the group Bandicoot, the partnership between singer Mick Fettes (Madder Lake) and comedian Shane Bourne.

Pinder then went into partnership with Roger Evans and opened the comedy venue The Last Laugh in September 1976. They formed a company called John Pinder and Roger Evans Ltd, and Evans ran his own restaurant in Sydney. Pinder said that Evans was much better at looking after the money side of things, but they were both involved in choosing acts to produce. Pinder had no idea where their idea would lead them, but he had connections with two groups - the Razzle Dazzle Revue and the Busby Berkleys, who performed in the opening show, called "Wunderkind Rocketship Show". The Last Laugh was a comedy theatre restaurant seating around 200 people, where many now famous comedians launched their careers. He produced many shows at The Last Laugh, including Circus Oz, until around 1985. One of their early successes was the Australian Performing Group's Back to Bourke Street, which toured several capital cities and included a run at the Adelaide Festival of the Arts. Pinder had seen the original show as a one-hour performance with a tiny cast showing at The Pram Factory, and invited them to The Last Laugh, where they expanded and reworked the production. Other successes included Waiter, There's a Circus in My Soup and Momma's Little Horror Show. The Last Laugh was extended in 1979, with an extra room with seating for 90, where midnight shows were staged. In 1987, Pinder sold the Last Laugh.

In 1986, Pinder persuaded the Victorian Tourism Commission to fund an overseas trip in order to visit other international comedy festivals and investigate the possibility of holding a festival in Melbourne. Pinder became convinced it would work, and after his return he wrote a report for the state government, which they accepted, leading to the establishment of the Melbourne International Comedy Festival.

In 1988, Pinder developed a package of 50 Australian performers to appear under the banner Oznost in the Assembly Rooms at the Edinburgh Fringe Festival. Most of the shows were comedy productions and several travelled to other European festivals under the Australian Bicentennial banner.

=== 1990s–2000s ===
Pinder moved to Sydney in the early 1990s, where he developed a series of festival venues, including The Starfish Club for the Adelaide Fringe Festival, where Stomp and the Tokyo Shock Boys had their Australian debut. The 1990s also saw Pinder move into television, initially as a consultant on Steve Vizard's Tonight Live, and was later creative consultant for The Comedy Channel on Foxtel.

In 2001, Robert Love, director of the Riverside Theatres Parramatta, asked Pinder to create a comedy festival around the Riverside Theatres hub. It became the Big Laugh Comedy Festival, and it ran until 2007. As festival director, Pinder was responsible for bringing The Goodies to Australia for a sell-out tour as part of the 2005 festival. He also co-produced the first live shows of The 3rd Degree, the comedy troupe which went on to become television sketch show The Ronnie Johns Half Hour.

In 2003, he was running the Big Laugh in Parramatta, in outer Sydney.

In 2009, Pinder was part of the team that devised The World's Funniest Island comedy event that takes place on Cockatoo Island in Sydney Harbour on the third weekend in October, and continued to serve as the event's director.

== Personal life ==
Pinder married Dasha Ross around 1987. Ross worked as a documentary production executive for the ABC for many years. The couple spent some time living in the Harlem neighbourhood in New York City as well as in Barcelona, Spain.

In 2012, after Ross had accepted a redundancy package from the ABC, they were asked by a friend if they would like to run his hotel on the south-west coast in Sri Lanka for a year while he was away in the UK. Despite having initial success after refurbishing the hotel and attracting guests back to it, they found they had to deal with "an angry former hotel manager who undermined them at every step, endemic corruption, and an owner in the UK who preferred to keep the trouble he created at a distance". After being threatened with violence by the former manager, after eight months they fled and returned to Australia. Ross published a memoir about the experience, called Big Trouble Coming (Valentine Press, 2024).

== Later life, death and legacy ==
In 2014, he appeared on the ABC documentary series about Australian comedy, Stop Laughing...This Is Serious.

Pinder died on 26 May 2015 after a bout of cancer, having been ill for some time. He is survived by his partner Dasha and two daughters.

Richard Stubbs paid tribute to Pinder on his 774 ABC Melbourne afternoon radio programme, saying he was "someone who demanded that you were better, someone who told you when you were rubbish, someone who stood up the back enthusiastically laughing and applauding when the audience wasn't...". Many comedians posted tributes to Pinder on social media, including Tom Ballard, Dom Knight, and Anthony Ackroyd, along with Circus Oz and playwright Alison Croggon.

A memorial service was held for him in the Melbourne Spiegeltent on 12 June 2015, emceed by Jane Clifton, who credited him with changing the culture of Melbourne, saying "the city of Melbourne owes John Pinder a huge debt of gratitude for the force of his vision and his great leaps of imagination. He taught us all to think big, think global, to recognise that entertainment is a universal thing".

=== Comedians' careers ===
During the late 1980s, Pinder was described as "the Sydney Greenstreet of Melbourne comedy". He is credited with discovering and showcasing the work of many comedians, including: Los Trios Ringbarkus, Brian Nankervis, Jean Kittson, Wendy Harmer, and Richard Stubbs. Some went on to feature in TV comedy shows, including: Geoff Brooks, Steve Blackburn, Alan Pentland, and Peter Moon, (later in Fast Forward); and Ian McFadyen, Mary-Anne Fahey, Peter Rowsthorn (actor) (The Comedy Company); and Jane Turner (Fast Forward, The D-Generation, Kath and Kim, and others).

He also co-produced the first live shows of The 3rd Degree, the comedy troupe which went on to become television sketch show The Ronnie Johns Half Hour.

He also gave performing arts producer Susan Provan her first job in comedy.

=== Pinder Prize ===
The Pinder Prize is awarded at MICF, to honour its co-founder, since 2016. The award supports a performer to travel to the Edinburgh Festival Fringe and present a show at Assembly Theatres, where Pinder presented many Australian artists. Winners of the prize include:

- 2016: Tom Ballard, for The World Keeps Happening
- 2017: Damien Power, for Utopia: Now in 3D!
- 2018: Demi Lardner, for I Love Skeleton
- 2019: Joint winners:
  -- Steph Tisdell, for The Pyramid
  -- Sam Taunton, for Straight From The Shoulder
- 2022: Danielle Walker, for Nostalgia
- 2023: Hannah Camilleri, for Lollybag
- 2024: Bronwyn Kuss, for Pillows XXX
