= Wendy Harmer =

Australian comedian and writer (born 1955)

- Born: Wendy Brown; 10 October 1955 (age 71); Yarram, Victoria, Australia
- Occupations: Writer, comedian, journalist
- Spouse: Brendan Donohoe
- Children: 2
- Writing career
- Years active: 1982−present
- Notable works: It's a Joke, Joyce (1989)

Wendy Gai Harmer (born 10 October 1955) is an Australian author, children's writer, journalist, playwright, dramatist, radio show host, comedian, and television personality.

== Early life and education ==
Wendy Brown was born in Yarram, the daughter of a teacher, and grew up in small country towns in Victoria, including Warncoort, Selby, California Gully and Freshwater Creek, as well as the city of Geelong, where she studied journalism at the Gordon Institute of TAFE and Deakin University, and became a reporter at the Geelong Advertiser.

== Career ==
Harmer's journalistic career took her to Melbourne, where she worked for The Sun News-Pictorial on the rounds of transport, urban affairs and state politics.

As an arts feature writer, she was introduced to a comedy group performing at the Flying Trapeze comedy venue. That group included Ian McFadyen, Mary-Anne Fahey and Peter Moon.

In 2003, Harmer created the book series, Pearlie The Park Fairy. The books were aimed at ages 6-8, and had 17 books in order. The books were acclaimed, but however, in 2009, they were adapted into a TV series called Pearlie. The TV show received mixed reviews.

Harmer left The Sun News-Pictorial and worked part-time at the Melbourne Times, while performing as a stand-up comedian in her days off. She is acknowledged as the first Australian woman to enter the all-male domain of stand-up comedy in the 2015 ABC TV series Stop Laughing...This Is Serious.

Not long afterwards, Harmer was headlining her own shows at the Last Laugh theatre restaurant, owned by entrepreneur John Pinder, and later by Rick McKenna. The shows included Faking It, Sunburn Bloody Sunburn, and Sunburn the Day After, which included the group from the Flying Trapeze and, among others, Mark Neale, Richard Stubbs, and Steve Vizard.

Harmer was on the board of the first Melbourne International Comedy Festival in 1987, which featured Barry Humphries and Peter Cook. She has also served on the boards of the Belvoir Theatre and the Malthouse Theatre.

She first appeared on television in the ABC children's show Trap, Winkle and Box. She then joined the satirical political TV series The Gillies Report, along with John Clarke, Phillip Scott, Tracy Harvey, Patrick Cook and Jean Kittson.

Harmer went on to host ABC TV's, The Big Gig, including, among others, performers Glynn Nicholas, Rod Quantock, Greg Fleet, Jean Kittson and the Doug Anthony All Stars.

She also hosted her own ABC TV talk series In Harmer's Way, with comedians Greg Fleet, Andrew Goodone, Simon Rogers and Tim Smith.

Harmer performed at the Edinburgh Festival on four occasions:

- With Richard Stubbs, as stand-up show Harmer and Stubbs
- With the Australian Government's 1988 OZNOST troupe, which included Magda Szubanski, Rod Quantock, Gina Riley, Kate Ceberano and Circus Oz
- In her one-woman show Love Gone Wrong, which was awarded "Pick of the Fringe" and was transferred to a theatre in London's West End for a limited season
- As a solo stand-up comic

She wrote, performed and sang in two one-woman shows with musicians - Love Gone Wrong and Please Send More Money, which was directed by Nigel Triffitt. Harmer also appeared on the Ben Elton show Friday Night Live with Dame Edna Everage and the Doug Anthony All Stars.

Her stand-up days were recalled in a 2015 episode of the ABC TV series Home Delivery hosted by Julia Zemiro.

Harmer also appeared in Australian Story Operation Wendy in 2005 in which she travelled to Fiji with the team from Interplast.

Harmer's performed her one-woman stand-up show Up Late and Loving It at Sydney's Wharf Theatre in 2001.

She performed at the 2016, 30th anniversary of the Melbourne International Comedy Festival.

== Radio career ==
In the mid 1980s Harmer started on radio at 3AK with a Saturday night shift she shared with Jane Clifton. Glenn Robbins was a regular guest. In 1992 she hosted a drive programme called Kaboom on Radio National. In 1993, Harmer joined 2Day FM, co-hosting the highly rated breakfast radio show The Morning Crew for 11 years. In September 2005, she started in the morning shift at the new Sydney and Melbourne radio station Vega FM, but by March 2006 she had quit her morning show after creative differences with management.

In 2016, Harmer returned to radio, presenting the morning program on ABC Radio Sydney alongside Robbie Buck. On 1 October 2021, Harmer and Buck announced via an ABC News story that they were leaving the morning program after working together for three years, stating that they decided to "go out on a high".

== Writing credits ==
Harmer is the author of seven books for adults: It's a Joke, Joyce (1989), Love Gone Wrong (1995), So anyway--: Wendy's words of wisdom (1997) (a collection of her weekly columns from the Sydney Morning Herald's Good Weekend Magazine), Farewell My Ovaries (2005), Nagging for Beginners (2006), Love and Punishment (2006). Roadside Sisters was published in April 2009. Her fourth was Friends Like These, published in 2011

Harmer's books have been described as being in the genre of chick lit or hen lit. Harmer wrote that the genres were misunderstood for The Age newspaper: "And if it's all just banal 'women''s stuff? If children, marriage, friendship and happiness are just of marginal concern? Pass me the pastel-covered girlie book and break out the chocolate!"

Harmer has also written a series of children's books called the Pearlie the Park Fairy. As of 2015 there are 17 books in the series published to date. They are bestsellers in Australia, and have been published in ten countries around the world. The animated series Pearlie has been shown on Australian, Canadian, and American television, and Harmer adapted the first book in the series, Pearlie in the Park, for the stage. In 2005, this play toured around Australia, performed by the Monkey Baa theatre company.

I Lost My Mobile at the Mall (2009) was Harmer's first novel for teens. The sequel was I Made Lattes for a Love God in 2012.

In addition to the Pearlie in the Park adaptation, Harmer has written two plays, Backstage Pass and What Is the Matter With Mary Jane? She also wrote the libretto for Baz Luhrmann's Opera Australia production of Lake Lost.

She has written for numerous Australian magazines, and has been a contributing columnist for The Australian Women's Weekly, New Weekly, The Good Weekend, HQ, Sunday Telegraph and Yours magazine.

Harmer contributed to Marie Claire's What Women Want in 2002, My Sporting Hero, edited by Greg Gowden and published by Random House Australia, and a volume of The Best Ever Sports Writing . . . 200 Years of Sport Writing.

She also wrote a chapter on "Women talk back", for Destroying The Joint: Why Women Have To Change The World, edited by Jane Caro.

Harmer founded the website The Hoopla, a news and opinion site for Australian women, in 2011. It closed in 2015.

== Television credits ==
Harmer was the host of the TV series The Big Gig, had her own TV chat show in 1990, In Harmer's Way, and co-starred in the World Series Debate with Andrew Denton from 1993 to 1994. Harmer hosted the Logie Awards of 2002, and was caught up in widespread media criticism of the event, with some focusing on her personal performance. In 2005, Harmer was the subject of an ABC Australian Story episode. Stuff, a four-part television documentary series which Harmer produced, wrote, and presented, premiered on ABC TV in 2008. The same year, Harmer commenced writing for the animated series Pearlie, based on her series of books. Harmer wrote many of the episodes, acted as a creative producer on the series, and even made a cameo appearance as Astrid the Dream Fairy.

== Political views ==
In a 2015 article for The Sydney Morning Herald, Harmer described herself as a "tragic lefty". In a 2013 humorous piece for The Hoopla, she described herself as an "old lefty". Harmer told the ABC Q&A program in November 2015 that her politics sounded "like an old fashioned socialist", that she objected to trends towards privatisation of public assets, and that the GST is not fair. In a 2014 piece for the Herald, Harmer cautioned against being too dismissive of opposing political views: "right and left need each other to progress, we should be more humble about our supposedly deeply-held beliefs and not so quick to label our opponents as either carelessly ill-informed or purposefully evil. Although, don't expect any extremist wingnut or idiotic greenie near you to get that any time soon!" Harmer advocated against the election of Republican Donald Trump at the 2016 United States presidential election.

=== Gender fluidity ===
Harmer wrote in 2016 that acceptance of "gender fluidity" could be one of the "best things" to happen in her lifetime, and that "I believe, with all my heart, that we exist on a dynamic spectrum of sexuality and that labels are at best useless, at worst tragically destructive."

=== Abbott-Turnbull government ===
Following the first Budget of the Abbott government in 2014, Harmer wrote: "The government we have now confounds me. It seems it is oblivious to all advice, evidence and entreaties. I just cannot understand how Joe Hockey has come up with a budget that offers no joy. At all. No carrot, all stick. All punishment and threats. No reward he's able to articulate. No budget emergency that stands up to scrutiny."

=== Republicanism ===
In 1993, she participated in a comic debate "Does Australia need the Royal Family", arguing the case for the negative alongside future Liberal leader Malcolm Turnbull and Labor politician Graham Richardson. In October 2015, Harmer tweeted that she is a member of the Australian Republican Movement, and encouraged others to join.

=== The Greens ===
Harmer described long term leader of the Australian Greens Bob Brown as "a good man prosecuting the good cause...".

=== Advocacy ===
Harmer was one of 28 members of the National People with Disabilities and Careers Council, created to advise the Australian Government on the development of the National Disability Strategy. She was also the ambassador for Interplast.

In 2014, Harmer wrote for The Sydney Morning Herald that her husband is a "dedicated greenie" and "Activism is now the core of our lives. Our kids have grown up behind protest banners."

=== Religion ===
In an article written for The Sydney Morning Herald in March 2013, Harmer described herself as "born into an atheist household", but said she attended Church of England Sunday school for a time until her father declared himself "humanist". She wrote in 2016 that her father was "a steadfastly non-religious man, a self-described humanist".

Nevertheless, she wrote, "I've remained deeply attracted to the tale of suffering and resurrection at the heart of the Christian narrative. Endlessly fascinated by accounts of religion, belief, myth, legend and fairytales... I'm one of those pathetic non-believers philosopher Alain de Botton bangs on about. The sad, godless orphans who can't pass a church or temple without entering to light a candle or offer a flower."

In an essay in Destroying The Joint: Why Women Have To Change The World edited by Jane Caro, Harmer wrote that her two children have been confirmed into the Catholic Church.

== Personal ==
Harmer is married to Brendan Donohoe and has two children.

She is a co-founder, of the Manly Warringah Sea Eagles's Angels, the women supporters' group for the local rugby league club.

== Awards ==
=== Mo Awards ===
The Australian Entertainment Mo Awards (commonly known informally as the Mo Awards), were annual Australian entertainment industry awards. They recognise achievements in live entertainment in Australia from 1975 to 2016. Wendy Harmer won one award in that time.

Year	Nominee / work	Award	Result (wins only)
1992	Wendy Harmer	Female Country Performer of the Year	Won
