= Stop Laughing...This Is Serious =

Stop Laughing...This Is Serious is a conversational-style Australian television documentary program which debuted in 2015 on the ABC. The first season of three episodes is narrated by Eric Bana and features 63 well-known comedians and actors who analyse the history of comedy in Australia and relive their own experiences. It includes Barry Humphries, Andrew Denton, Adam Hills, Shaun Micallef, Garry McDonald, Magda Szubanski and Paul Hogan. The second season, narrated by Colin Lane, screened in 2017. Its title references a famous 1933 cartoon by Stan Cross.

== Episodes ==
=== Season 1 ===
- Episode 1: "Faark, Faark"
- Episode 2: "Look at Moi, Look at Moi"
- Episode 3: "Hello Possums"

Narrator: Eric Bana
Participants: Adam Hills, Andrew Denton, Andrew Knight, Austen Tayshus, Barry Humphries, Chris Taylor, Christiaan Van Vuuren, Colin Lane, Craig Reucassel, Dave Hughes, Denise Scott, Frank Woodley, Garry McDonald, Gary Reilly, Glenn Robbins, Graeme Blundell, Grahame Bond, Greig Pickhaver, Ian McFadyen, Jane Turner, John Clarke, John Doyle, John Pinder, John Safran, Judith Lucy, Julia Morris, Julia Zemiro, Kevin Kropinyeri, Lawrence Mooney, Libbi Gorr, Magda Szubanski, Mary Coustas, Mary Kenneally, Mick Molloy, Mikey Robins, Nazeem Hussain, Neill Gladwin, Nicholas Boshier, Nick Giannopoulos, Noeline Brown, Paul Fenech, Paul Hogan, Paul McDermott, Richard Fidler, Rod Quantock, Rodney Rude, Rove McManus, Santo Cilauro, Sean Choolburra, Shane Bourne, Shane Jacobson, Shaun Micallef, Steve Kearney, Steve Vizard, Sue Ingleton, Susan Provan, Tim Ferguson, Tim Minchin, Tom Ballard, Toni Lamond, Tony Martin, Tony Sattler, and Wendy Harmer

=== Season 2 ===
- Episode 1: "She Goes... She Goes... She Just Goes"
- Episode 2: "I Said Pet, I Said Pet, I Said Love"
- Episode 3: "Too Much Variety is Barely Enough"

== See also ==
- The Agony of...
