= A Cuppla Days =

Single by Con the Fruiterer

from the album The Comedy Company Album
- Released: November 1988
- Length: 3:53
- Label: CBS Records
- Songwriter(s): Colin Hay, Greg Ham
- Producer(s): Colin Hay, Greg Ham

The Comedy Company singles chronology
| "So Excellent" (1988) | "A Cuppla Days" (1988) |

"A Cuppla Days" is a single released by Con the Fruiterer, a character portrayed by Mark Mitchell in the TV series The Comedy Company. The single was released in November 1988 as the second and final single from the TV series' debut studio album The Comedy Company Album. The song peaked at number 48 on the ARIA Charts.

At the ARIA Music Awards of 1989 the song was nominated for the ARIA Award for Best Comedy Release.

== Track listing ==
CD/Cassingle (653148 7)

1. "A Cuppla Days" - 3:53
2. "The Con Dance" - 4:26

== Charts ==
| Chart (1988/89) | Peak position |
|---|---|
| Australia (ARIA) | 48 |
