= So Excellent =

"So Excellent / I Go I Go"

Single by Kylie Mole

from the album The Comedy Company Album
- Released: October 1988
- Length: 4:41
- Label: CBS Records
- Songwriter(s): Doug MacLeod, Ian McFadyen, Robyn Smith
- Producer(s): Robyn Smith

The Comedy Company singles chronology
| "So Excellent / I Go I Go" (1988) | "A Cuppla Days" (1988) |

"So Excellent / I Go I Go" is a double-A sided single released by Kylie Mole, a character portrayed by Mary-Anne Fahey in the TV series The Comedy Company. The single was released in October 1988 as the lead single from the TV series' debut studio album The Comedy Company Album. The song peaked at number 8 on the ARIA Charts.

At the ARIA Music Awards of 1989 the song was nominated for the ARIA Award for Best Comedy Release.

== Track listing ==
CD/Cassingle (653028 3)

1. "So Excellent" - 4:41
2. "I Go I Go"

12" (653028 6)

- Side A "So Excellent" - 4:41
- Side A "So Excellent" (Extended version)
- Side B "I Go I Go" (Extended version)
- Side B "I Go I Go" (Instrumental)

== Charts ==
| Chart (1988/89) | Peak position |
|---|---|
| Australia (ARIA) | 8 |
