= Comedy Company Classics =

Studio album by The Comedy Company
- Released: November 1989
- Label: CBS

The Comedy Company chronology
The Comedy Company Album (1988)	Comedy Company Classics (1989)

Comedy Company Classics is the second and final studio album by Australian comedy television series The Comedy Company. The album was released in November 1989 and peaked at number 98 on The Australian ARIA Charts.

At the ARIA Music Awards of 1990 the album was nominated for Best Comedy Release.

== Track listing ==
No.	Title	Length
1.	"Wildman"
2.	"Giving Evidence" (by Colin Carpenter)
3.	"The Chicken" (by Jophesine)
4.	"The Phone" (by Wildman)
5.	"Sex" (by Two Dogs)
6.	"Home Late (Bed scene)"
7.	"I Was Too Young" (by Colin Carpenter)
8.	"Wildman"
9.	"Mother & Baby"
10.	"Come Here for One Minute"
11.	"At Grandma's" (by Kylie Mole)
12.	"The Maternity Ward" (by Con the Fruiterer)
13.	"Wildman's Contests"
14.	"Christmas" (by Colin Carpenter)
15.	"The Stump (Bed scene)"
16.	"The Phone Bill" (by The Postie)
17.	"I No Complain" (by Marika)
18.	"Storytime" (by Uncle Arthur)

== Charts ==
Chart (1989/1990)	Peak position
Australian (ARIA Chart)	98

== Release history ==
Region	Date	Format	Label	Catalogue
Australia / New Zealand	November 1989	LP; Cassette; CD	CBS Records	466119 1/466119 2/466119 4
