= Flying trapeze (disambiguation) =

A flying trapeze is a form of trapeze in which a performer jumps from a platform with the trapeze so that gravity makes the trapeze swing.

Flying trapeze may also refer to:

- "The Daring Young Man on the Flying Trapeze" (song), also known as "The Flying Trapeze"
- Flying Trapeeze (also spelt Trapeze), the first comedy venue in Melbourne, created in 1973 by John Pinder
- Flying Trapeze (anime), based on a short story by Hideo Okuda
