= The Comedy Company Album =

Studio album by The Comedy Company
- Released: November 1988
- Label: CBS

The Comedy Company chronology
The Comedy Company Album (1988)	Comedy Company Classics (1989)

Singles from The Comedy Company Album
- 1. "So Excellent"/"I Go I Go" Released: October 1988; 2. "A Cuppla Days" Released: November 1988

The Comedy Company Album is the debut studio album by Australian comedy television series The Comedy Company. The album was released in November 1988 and peaked at number 9 on The Australian ARIA Charts.

At the ARIA Music Awards of 1989 the album won the ARIA Award for Best Comedy Release.

== Track listing ==
No.	Title	Writer(s)	Length
1.	"Being Dropped" (by Kylie Mole)
2.	"I Go I Go" (by Kylie Mole)	Doug MacLeod, Greg Sneddon, Ian McFadyen
3.	"At the CES" (by Colin Carpenter)
4.	"The Language of Football"
5.	"Getting Married" (by the Typist)
6.	"Playschool"
7.	"The Office Desk" (by David Rabbitborough)
8.	"Uncle Arthur's Song: Row Row Row Your Boat" (by Uncle Arthur)
9.	"You're Going Off Me" (by Bedscene)
10.	"Roula's Birthday" (by Con the Fruiterer)
11.	"The Student Teacher" (by Kylie Mole)
12.	"So Excellent" (by Kylie Mole)	MacLeod, McFadyen, Robyn Smith
13.	"The Car" (by Colin Carpenter)
14.	"The Language of Seduction"
15.	"Drive Time Aerobics"
16.	"Your Mother's Greatest Hits"
17.	"NBC News"
18.	"The Handbag" (by David Rabbitborough)
19.	"Shop Assistant School"
20.	"We Never Talk" (by Bedscene)
21.	"A Cuppla Days" (by Con the Fruiterer)	Colin Hay, Greg Ham

== Charts ==
Chart (1988/89)	Peak position
Australian Albums (ARIA)	9
New Zealand Albums (RMNZ)	48

== Awards ==
The ARIA Music Awards are a set of annual ceremonies presented by Australian Recording Industry Association (ARIA), which recognise excellence, innovation, and achievement across all genres of the music of Australia. They commenced in 1987.

Year	Nominee / work	Award	Result	Ref.
ARIA Music Awards of 1989	The Comedy Company Album	ARIA Award for Best Comedy Release	Won	

== Release history ==
Region	Date	Format	Label	Catalogue
Australia / New Zealand	November 1988	LP; Cassette; CD	CBS Records	462994 1/462994 2/462994 4
