= Simon Chilvers =

Australian actor

- Born: 5 April 1939 (age 86); Potters Bar, Middlesex, England
- Occupation: Actor
- Notable work: The Dunera Boys; True Believers; Rafferty's Rules; Buddies

Simon Chilvers (born 5 April 1939) is an English-born, Australia-based television actor.

== Early life ==
Chilvers was born in London in 1939, and discovered art as a young child, drawing images of planes flying overhead during World War II.

He attended Knox Grammar School, in the Sydney suburb of Wahroonga, from 1949 to 1956. Upon leaving school, his parents encouraged him to pursue a career in advertising. Unenthused, he was instead inspired by his grandmother to attend an acting audition, where he was immediately offered a role.

== Career ==
Chilvers started off his career acting for the stage, at the Melbourne Theatre Company, playing roles In productions by Shakespeare, Ibsen and Chekhov.

He went on to appear in television series such as A Country Practice, Prisoner, Homicide and Division 4. He also played the main role of Sergeant Julian Flicker in drama series Rafferty's Rules.

Chilvers won the 1986 AFI Best Performance by an Actor in a Leading Role in a Mini Series for his role in the miniseries The Dunera Boys. He was nominated for the same award in 1988 for political miniseries True Believers (in which he played Doctor Evatt), and for the 1983 AFI Award for Best Actor in a Supporting Role for comedy-drama film Buddies.

Chilvers' acting career was upended in 1996 when he was diagnosed with Multiple sclerosis, after experiencing an incident on stage. He gradually became less mobile and eventually his work was limited mostly to narration work in documentaries.

== Personal life ==
Chilvers and his wife Sally met at the ages of 43 and 21, respectively, while working together on a Sydney Theatre Company production of A Happy and Holy Occasion in 1982. Sally was the assistant manager on the production. After conducting a long distance relationship between Melbourne and Sydney, they moved into a flat together in Manly in 1986.

In 1996, Chilvers was diagnosed with primary progressive multiple sclerosis. In 2016, his wife qualified as a practitioner of traditional Chinese medicine, and treats him on a daily basis.

Chilvers has resided in the Sydney suburb of Fairlight for 30 years.

== Awards and nominations ==
Year	Work	Award	Category	Result
1983	Buddies	Australian Film Institute Awards	Best Actor in a Supporting Role	Nominated
1986	The Dunera Boys	Australian Film Institute Awards	Best Actor in a Leading Role in a Miniseries	Nominated
1988	True Believers	Australian Film Institute Awards	Best Actor in a Leading Role in a Miniseries	Nominated

== Filmography ==
=== Film ===
Year	Title	Role	Type
1965	Daphne Laureola		TV movie
1972	The Man Who Shot the Albatross		Feature film
1974	The End Product	Dr Cardios	TV movie
1974	The Cherry Orchard		TV movie
1977	High Rolling	Sideshow Boss	Feature film
1983	Buddles	Alfred	Feature film
1983	A Descent for Gossips	Mr. Findlay	TV movie
1984	Annie's Coming Out	Metcalf	Feature film
1984	The Young Wife	Peter Barwine	TV movie
1985	The Naked Country	Inspector Poole	Feature film
1986	Sky Pirates	Rev. Mitchell	Feature film
1986	Robbery	Chief Super. Bill Sullivan	TV movie
1986	The Big Hurt	Algerson	Feature film
1986	Windrider	Howard	Feature film
1989	Home Brew	Pat Daley	TV movie
1992	Garbo	Detective	Feature film
1992	The Time Game	George Johnson	Feature film
1995	Mushrooms	Instop	Feature film
2004	Jessica	Judge	TV movie
2005	Hell Has Harbour Views	George Hancock	TV movie

=== Television ===
Year	Title	Role	Type
1983	And the Big Men Fly	Harry Head	TV miniseries
1965	The Magic Boomerang		
1973-74	Ryan	Henderson / Fat man / Joe	TV series
1972-75	Division 4	Joseph Cooper / Charlie Gibson / Brent Nichols	TV series
1977	Homicide	3 roles	TV series
1976-81	Cop Shop	Various	TV series
1983	Prisoner	Det. Sgt. Terry Farmer	TV series
1983	Five Mile Creek	Lord Rivers	TV series
1983	The Young Doctors	Steven Karp	TV series
1984	A Country Practice	Cameron McPherson	TV series
1984	Waterfront	Cross	TV miniseries
1984	The Last Reunion	Earle Page	TV miniseries
1984	The Cowra Breakout	Major. Horden	TV miniseries
1984	Special Squad	Maguire	TV series
1984	Eureka Stockade	Bishop Goold	TV miniseries
1985	The Dunera Boys	Col. Berry	TV miniseries
1987	The Petrov Affair	H.V. Evatt	TV miniseries
1987	Willing and Abel	Pisani	TV series
1987	Ground Zero	Commission President	Film
1987	The Shiralee	Thaddeus	TV miniseries
1988	True Believers	H.V. Evatt	TV miniseries
1987-91	Rafferty's Rules	Jullian Flicker	TV series
1991	Ratbag Hero	Baldy	TV miniseries
1992	Cluedo	Harold Felon	TV series
1993	Minder	Bill McCabe	TV series
1994	The Damnation of Harvey McHugh	Douglass	TV miniseries
1995	Janus	Magistrate. Shearer	TV series
1997	Fallen Angels	Bernie Levinson	TV series
1999	Big Sky	Rex	TV series
2001	The Farm	Phil Reynolds	TV miniseries
2001	Always Greener	Charlie Parker	TV series
2003	Changi	Father Keogh	TV miniseries
2001	Corridors of Power	Lester	TV series
1999-2007	All Saints	3 roles	TV series
2009	Rogue Nation	Child Judge	
2019	Rake	Albert	TV series

== Theatre ==
=== As actor ===
Year	Title	Role	Notes
1961	Restless Heart		Pymble Community Hall, Sydney
1962	Noah		NSW tour with Pymble Players Inc
1962	The Desk Set		St Martins Theatre, Melbourne
1962	Blithe Spirit	Charles	VIC & SA regional tour with Union Theatre Repertory Company
1963	Richard II		University of Melbourne with Union Theatre Repertory Company
1963	The Devil’s Disciple	Major Swindon	University of Melbourne with Union Theatre Repertory Company
1963	A Cheery Soul	Mr Furze	University of Melbourne with Union Theatre Repertory Company
1963	The Man Who Came to Dinner		Russell St Theatre, Melbourne with Union Theatre Repertory Company
1963–1964	And the Big Men Fly	Commentator / Harry Head	Russell St Theatre, Melbourne, Arts Theatre, Adelaide, Victorian regional tour with Union Theatre Repertory Company
1964	Critic's Choice		University of Melbourne with Union Theatre Repertory Company
1964	Hamlet	Horatio	University of Melbourne, Russell St Theatre, Melbourne with Union Theatre Repertory Company
1964	Love Rides the Rails or Will the Mail Train Run Tonight?		Russell St Theatre, Melbourne with Union Theatre Repertory Company
1964	The Golden Legion of Cleaning Women		Russell St Theatre, Melbourne with Union Theatre Repertory Company
1964	After the Fall		Russell St Theatre, Melbourne with Union Theatre Repertory Company
1964	Photo Finish	Sam at Forty	University of Melbourne with Union Theatre Repertory Company
1964	Night of the Auk	Colonel Tom Russell	University of Melbourne with Union Theatre Repertory Company
1964–1965	A Thousand Clowns	Albert Amundson	University of Melbourne with Union Theatre Repertory Company
1965	Present Laughter		Russell St Theatre, Melbourne with Union Theatre Repertory Company
1968	The Crucible		Russell St Theatre, Melbourne with MTC
1968	The Magistrate		Russell St Theatre, Melbourne, Canberra Theatre, Mildura Arts Centre, Broken Hill, King's Theatre, Mt Gambier, Adelaide Teachers College with MTC
1968	The Prime of Miss Jean Brodie		Russell St Theatre, Melbourne with MTC
1968	Burke's Company	Wright	Russell St Theatre, Melbourne with MTC
1968	The Man in the Glass Booth		Russell St Theatre, Melbourne with MTC
1970	Cat Among the Pigeons		Russell St Theatre, Melbourne, Canberra Theatre with MTC
1970	A Doll's House	Dr Rank	Russell St Theatre, Melbourne, Canberra Theatre with MTC
1970	Philadelphia, Here I Come!		Russell St Theatre, Melbourne with MTC
1970	The Caucasian Chalk Circle	Shalva	Russell St Theatre, Melbourne with MTC
1970	Day of Glory		Russell St Theatre, Melbourne with MTC
1970	The Devils		Russell St Theatre, Melbourne with MTC
1970	Son of Man		Russell St Theatre, Melbourne with MTC
1971	All's Well That Ends Well	Captain Dumain	Octagon Theatre, Perth with MTC
1971	The Government Inspector		Russell St Theatre, Melbourne with MTC
1971	The Philanthropist		Russell St Theatre, Melbourne with MTC
1971	King Lear		Russell St Theatre, Melbourne with MTC
1971	The Recruiting Officer		Russell St Theatre, Melbourne with MTC
1971	Galileo		Russell St Theatre, Melbourne, Canberra Theatre with MTC
1971	The Contractor		Russell St Theatre, Melbourne, Canberra Theatre with MTC
1971	The Man Who Shot the Albatross	Major Johnston	Princess Theatre, Melbourne, Canberra Theatre, Elizabethan Theatre, Sydney, Her Majesty's Theatre, Adelaide with MTC
1972	Danton's Death		Russell St Theatre, Melbourne with MTC
1972	Macquarie		Russell St Theatre, Melbourne with MTC
1972	Sticks and Bones		Russell St Theatre, Melbourne with MTC
1972	An Ideal Husband		Comedy Theatre, Melbourne, Her Majesty's Theatre, Brisbane, Playhouse, Perth with MTC & J. C. Williamson's
1972–1973	The Cherry Orchard		Elizabethan Theatre, Sydney, Comedy Theatre, Melbourne, Playhouse, Perth, Canberra Theatre with MTC
1973	Mother Courage		Princess Theatre, Melbourne with MTC
1973	Batman's Beach-Head		Comedy Theatre, Melbourne with MTC & J. C. Williamson's
1973	Paying the Piper		Comedy Theatre, Melbourne with MTC
1973	Design for Living		St Martins Theatre, Melbourne with MTC
1974	The Doctor's Dilemma		St Martins Theatre, Melbourne with MTC
1974	The Removalists		Russell St Theatre, Melbourne with MTC
1974	The Sea		Russell St Theatre, Melbourne with MTC
1974	Pericles, Prince of Tyre		Russell St Theatre, Melbourne with MTC
1975	Much Ado About Nothing		Russell St Theatre, Melbourne, Canberra Theatre with MTC
1975	Thark		St Martins Theatre, Melbourne with MTC
1976	Going Home		St Martins Theatre, Melbourne with MTC
1976	Othello		Russell St Theatre, Melbourne with MTC
1977	The Game of Love and Chance	Dorante	St Martins Theatre, Melbourne with MTC
1977	The School for Scandal	Sir Peter Teazle	Melbourne Athenaeum with MTC
1977	The Wild Duck	Hjalmar Ekdal	Melbourne Athenaeum with MTC
1977	The Merchant of Venice	Antonio	Melbourne Athenaeum with MTC
1977	Pygmalion	Colonel Pickering	Melbourne Athenaeum with MTC
1977	Ring Round the Moon	Romainville	Melbourne Athenaeum with MTC
1978	Breaker Morant		Melbourne Athenaeum with MTC
1978	Departmental	Superintendent Spartan	Russell St Theatre, Melbourne with MTC
1979	Bodies	Mervyn	Russell St Theatre, Melbourne with MTC
1979	Macbeth	Macbeth	Melbourne Athenaeum with MTC
1979	Uncle Vanya	Ivan Petrovitch Voynitsky (Uncle Vanya)	Melbourne Athenaeum with MTC
1979	The Alchemist	Face	Melbourne Athenaeum with MTC
1979–1980	Hamlet	Claudius / Ghost	Melbourne Athenaeum with MTC
1980	Hobson's Choice	Henry Horatio Hobson	Melbourne Athenaeum with MTC
1980	Rosencrantz and Guildenstern Are Dead	Claudius	Melbourne Athenaeum with MTC
1980	Privates on Parade	Acting Captain Terri Dennis	Melbourne Athenaeum with MTC
1981	Pete McGynty and the Dreamtime	Parson	Melbourne Athenaeum with MTC
1981–1982	A Cuckoo in the Nest		Melbourne Athenaeum with MTC
1982	Minna von Barnhelm	Major Von Tellhelm	Melbourne Athenaeum with MTC
1982	A Happy and Holy Occasion		Sydney Opera House with STC
1983; 1986	Gulls	Bill Clements	Russell St Theatre, Melbourne with MTC & Belvoir St Theatre, Sydney with HMQ Productions
1983	The Cherry Orchard		Sydney Opera House with STC
1983	The Maid's Tragedy		Melbourne Athenaeum with MTC
1984–1986	Master Class	Zhdanov	South Australian tour, Sydney Opera House, Playhouse, Melbourne with The Stage Company
1985	Heartbreak House		Sydney Opera House with STC
1987	Pericles		Wharf Theatre, Sydney with STC
1987	A Lie of the Mind		Belvoir St Theatre, Sydney
1988	And the Big Men Fly	Harry Head / Commentator	Russell St Theatre, Melbourne with MTC
1991	The Mikado	Singer	Sydney Opera House with The Australian Opera
1991	Sixteen Words for Water	Ezra Pound	Wharf Theatre, Sydney with STC
1992	No Going Back	Edvards / Leichhardt	Russell St Theatre, Melbourne with MTC
1992	Diving for Pearls		Space Theatre, Adelaide with STCSA
1993	Into the Woods	Narrator	Sydney Opera House with STC
1993	Coriolanus		Sydney Opera House with STC
1995	Dead White Males	Colonel Judd	Sydney Opera House, Glen St Theatre, Sydney, Playhouse, Melbourne, His Majesty's Theatre, Perth with STC

=== As director ===
Year	Title	Role	Notes
1971	The Trial of the Catonsville Nine	Assistant Director	Russell St Theatre, Melbourne with MTC
1972	The Tavern	Director	Russell St Theatre, Melbourne with MTC
1973–1974	The Last of the Knucklemen	Director	Russell St Theatre, Melbourne, Sydney Opera House, Playhouse, Canberra with MTC
1974	London Assurance	Director	St Martins Theatre, Melbourne with MTC
1975	Shindig!	Director	Russell St Theatre, Melbourne with MTC
1975	The Freeway	Director	Russell St Theatre, Melbourne with MTC
1976	Old Flames	Director	VCA, Melbourne with MTC
1978	Arsenic and Old Lace	Director	Melbourne Athenaeum with MTC
1978–1979	The Club	Director	Playhouse, Perth, Russell St Theatre, Melbourne with MTC
1980	The Matchmaker	Director	Melbourne Athenaeum with MTC
1980	The Man Who Came to Dinner	Director	Melbourne Athenaeum with MTC
1980	Rosencrantz and Guildenstern Are Dead	Associate Director	Melbourne Athenaeum with MTC
1981	A Man for All Seasons	Director	Melbourne Athenaeum with MTC
1981	The London Cuckolds	Director	Melbourne Athenaeum with MTC
1981–1982	A Cuckoo in the Nest	Director	Melbourne Athenaeum with MTC
1982	Hedda Gabler	Associate Director	Melbourne Athenaeum with MTC

== Radio (partial credits) ==
Year	Title	Role	Notes
1990	On the Still Air	Ezra Pound	ABC Radio
2001	Dreams of Hesselmed		ABC Radio
2004	Last Days of the Coq D'Or	Readings from Hansard and ASIO documents	ABC Radio
2009	No Place Like Holmes	Watson	ABC Radio
