= Simon Dodd =

- Born: June 7, 1959 (age 67); Australia
- Citizenship: Australia
- Occupations: Writer, author, playwright
- Writing career
- Genres: Comedy, fiction, theatre
- Website: simondodd.com.au

Simon Dodd (born 7 June 1959) is an Australian comedy writer, author, playwright and feature writer. He is the recipient of ten Australian Writers' Guild AWGIE Awards as part of the writing team behind such successful TV series as Good News Week and The Glass House. His list of credits includes popular Australian comedy TV shows from the late 1980s until today. He also wrote for Logies host Andrew Denton in 1999 and 2000. In 2014, he produced and directed his Absurdist comedy stage-play Plaything at the Factory Theatre for the Sydney Comedy Festival, garnering a number of positive reviews.

Simon has worked with Andrew Denton, Doug Mulray, Paul McDermott, Wil Anderson and Amanda Keller. He is co-writer with Bruce Griffiths of 26 episodes of the animated TV series The Flamin’ Thongs. Simon is also the author of the novel Death By Muttonbird and the stage play Plaything.

He has also written features for the Sydney Morning Herald and HQ Magazine, as well as a number of travel pieces for lifestyle magazines. Simon lives in Waverton, New South Wales with his wife, magazine editor Margaret Megard, and their Burmese Blue cat, Mymble.
