= The Dunera Boys =

- Written by: Ben Lewin
- Directed by: Ben Lewin
- Starring: Bob Hoskins; Warren Mitchell; John Meillon
- Country of origin: Australia
- Original language: English
- No. of episodes: 2

Production
- Producer: Bob Weis

Original release
- Network: Network 10
- Release: 3 October 1985 – 1985

The Dunera Boys is a 1985 Australian mini-series based on the Dunera incident.

== Plot ==
At the beginning of World War 2, in the interests of national security, the British Government made the decision to arrest all Germans in the UK, as well as many Jewish male refugees, whom the British feared might have been German spies. In 1940, a large group were rounded up and sent to Prisoner of war camps in Australia, aboard the HMT Dunera. Amongst them, are Morrie Mendellsohn (Bob Hoskins), a British fishmonger and Alexander Engelhardt (Joseph Spano), a concert violinist. The story depicts the hardship, alienation and brotherhood they encountered along the way.

== Cast ==
- Bob Hoskins as Morrie Mendellsohn
- Joseph Spano as Alexander Engelhardt
- Warren Mitchell as Mr. Braun
- Joseph Fürst as The Baron
- John Meillon as Brigadier Templeton
- Simon Chilvers as Colonel Berry
- Julia Blake as Mum
- Maurie Fields as Corporal Carter
- Alex Menglet as Roth
- Wynn Roberts as Slattery
- Steven Vidler as Tropp
- Kym Gyngell as Private Bruce
- Mark Little as Pvt. Wally Dunstan
- Mary-Anne Fahey as Naomi Mendellsohn
- Bruno Lucia as Abe Joelstein (uncredited)

== Awards and nominations ==
Award	Category	Result
AFI Awards	Best Miniseries	Won
AFI Awards	Best Achievement in Direction in a Miniseries (Ben Lewin)	Won
AFI Awards	Best Achievement in Script in a Miniseries (Ben Lewin)	Won
AFI Awards	Best Performance by an Actor in a Miniseries (Simon Chilvers)	Won
AWGIE Awards	Best Television Miniseries Adaptation (Ben Lewin)	Won
