= The Genie from Down Under =

Australian-British children's comedy television series

- Created by: Patricia Edgar; Esben Storm
- Directed by: Esben Storm; Brendan Maher; Jeremy Swan
- Starring: Alexandra Milman; Rhys Muldoon (Series 1); Sandy Winton (Series 2); Glenn Meldrum; Anna Galvin; Ian McFadyen; Monica Maughan; Mark Mitchell
- Countries of origin: Australia; United Kingdom
- No. of seasons: 2
- No. of episodes: 26

Production
- Executive producers: Patricia Edgar; Anna Home
- Producers: Patricia Edgar; Phil Jones
- Running time: 25 minutes
- Production company: Australian Children's Television Foundation

Original release
- Network: ABC; BBC1
- Release: 8 January 1996 – 19 August 1998

The Genie from Down Under is an Australian-British children's comedy television series. It is a co-production between the ACTF, the BBC and the ABC from that aired from 8 Jan 1996 to 19 August 1998. The Genie from Down Under is based on an idea from Steve J. Spears which was developed into a series concept with a "Round the Twist" flavour. Esben Storm, Steve Spears and a team of writers work-shopped the storylines. Patricia Edgar was looking for a new idea for a comedy series which would capture the debate about Australia becoming a republic - a significant issue in Australia at the time. She invited a few writers to submit original ideas then chose the concept submitted by Steve Spears to workshop its potential. She asked Esben Storm, who had been the co-author and director of the successful Round the Twist series to lead the development workshop.

Following the success of Round the Twist on the BBC, the head of children's television Anna Home agreed to put up half the $4.1 million budget for a co-production. This was half the budget which was the highest level of finance the Film Finance Corporation (FFC) had ever seen from an overseas co-production partner. The program met the BBC requirements for a United Kingdom production and was also able to meet the objectives for programming produced by the Foundation in Australia. Even though the entire series was shot in Australia, the story was set in both Australia and the United Kingdom and one of the lead cast and one of the directors was British. Produced by Patricia Edgar and Phil Jones and directed by Esben Storm, Jeremy Swan (of the BBC) and Brendan Maher, the series is a comedy with distinctive Australian humour. With this project, the ACTF broke new ground with a production financing structure.

The first series went to air in the United Kingdom in January 1996 on BBCI in the critical 4.30 to 5pm timeslot. It won two and a half million viewers – 40 per cent of its audience. The success story was repeated in over 20 countries. In Belgium, Canada, Cyprus, Denmark, Finland, France, Germany, Greece, Hong Kong, Iceland, Ireland, Israel, Italy, Malta, New Zealand, Poland, South Africa, Switzerland, Thailand and The Netherlands, children – and adults – loved the Australian humour.

The Genie from Down Under is one of Australia's favourite comedy series for children and adults alike. Broadcast Magazine recorded The Genie from Down Under (series 2) as the 10th highest rating children's series in the United Kingdom during its broadcast by the BBC.

== Premise ==
The honourable Penelope Townes is a 13-year old aristocrat from England who lives with her widowed mother, Lady Diana, with their housekeeper Miss Mossop at Townes Hall. Townes is a stately but crumbling mansion in Wiltshire, England.

Penelope comes into possession of an opal pendant when she explores the dusty attic of her family's decaying mansion. The opal contains two Australian genies, Bruce and his son Baz, who have been living inside the opal for 130 years since Penelope's great, great-grandfather, Sir Claude, brought them to England. This is the setting for a battle of wits and a clash of class and culture. Penelope is a selfish snob who sees the Genie as her property and has the power. Bruce, the genie is an ocker and has the magic.

So when Penelope – in an unguarded moment – wishes she were somewhere else, Bruce whisks her overseas, to her inheritance, Townes Downs, a rundown property in the middle of 800 square kilometres (310 sq mi) of Australian outback. Penelope hates Australia and is constantly trying to get back to Townes Hall in Wiltshire. Bruce thinks Townes Downs is heaven on earth and Townes Hall is hell.

Typically, an episode revolves around the consequences of one of Penelope's flippant wishes, or the efforts of an outside party to steal the opal (and thus, the genies).

When Penelope inherits a property in Australia (Townes Downs), Bruce and Baz are overjoyed because it means that they can spend more time in their own country. When they go to inspect the property, they meet Otto von Meister, who runs tours of outback Australia. His forefather stole the opal from the Aboriginal peoples and then lost it in a card game to Penelope's ancestor, Sir Claude. Otto is determined to return the opal to its rightful owner – him. When he finds out that Penelope has the opal, he tries to steal it from her. He often enlists his nephew, Conrad, to help him. Penelope falls in love with Conrad, which gives Otto far more opportunity to steal the opal. The battle for possession of the opal sees Otto become King of England and Bubbles lead his band of Merry Chaps in green to plot the end to King Otto's reign.

Things are further complicated when Bruce falls in love with Penelope's mother, Lady Diana Townes. She is already supposedly in love with Lord Roderick "Bubbles" Ackrington-Smyth, however, it is revealed that this is only because of his money, and she in turn falls in love with Bruce.

In the end, Penelope accepts that Bruce and her mother are in love, and gives the opal to her mother, allowing Bruce to reveal his true identity. Bruce and Diana end up marrying.

== Cast ==
- Alexandra Milman as Penelope Townes
- Rhys Muldoon as Bruce (Season 1)
- Sandy Winton as Bruce (Season 2)
- Glenn Meldrum as Baz
- Anna Galvin as Lady Diana Townes
- Monica Maughan as Miss Mossop
- Mark Mitchell as Otto von Meister
- Fletcher Humphrys as Conrad von Meister
- Kylie Belling as Trish Emu (Season 1)
- Bobbi Henry as Darlene (Season 2)
- Ian McFadyen as Lord 'Bubbles' Uppington-Smyth
- Emily Milburn as Marcia (Season 1)
- Petra Yared as Marcia (Season 2)
- Jacinta Stapleton as Sophie Mills
- Nique Needles as Barry
- Denise Scott as Denise
- Nicholas Bell as Nigel Huntly (Season 2)
- Alex Menglet as Grigor (Season 2)

== Characters ==
- Bruce is the laconic larrikin who doesn't think much of Poms, but can't help falling for Penelope's widowed mother, Diana. He's 5,000 years old, but looks 35, and his magic-making gesture is the Aussie Wave – the swat used by mortals to brush away flies.
- Penelope Townes is brave, self-centred, and snobbish – if it's not English it doesn't rate. Penelope quickly finds out that she can control Bruce's behaviour, but not his heart. She has a secret slave but she can't make him like her.
- Miss Mossop, the tough and loyal old housekeeper devoted to the Townes family.
- Conrad von Meister, Otto's nephew, an unscrupulous Antipodean Adonis with the power to make Penelope weak at the knees. He is determined to get back the von Meister opal – and sell it.
- Otto von Meister, who runs Crocodile Otto Outback Experience. Married five times, he considers himself a ladies man. Otto believes that if Sir Claude hadn't stolen the opal from his forefather everything would be different.
- Trish Emu, an Aboriginal woman who is Otto's Experience Coordinator. She's the tour translator (she speaks fluent Japanese), cook, aerobics instructor, entertainment officer, driver and purser. Trish is attracted to Bruce but he's shy – and in any case, he's attracted to Diana.
- Lady Diana Townes, who carries the heavy burden of the Townes tradition and, to save Townes Hall, is considering marrying Bubbles, a wealthy man she doesn't love... until Bruce comes along. More than class and culture separate them however. Unknown to her, Bruce isn't human.
- Baz, the eight-year-old son of Bruce. Like his dad, Baz has the power to grant any wish. And like him, he has a large larrikin streak that causes him to put a little spin on your wish.
- Bubbles is a filthy rich and terribly posh but rather ineffectual. An honours graduate from the university of upper class twits, he wants to marry Diana.
- Darlene, Otto's tourist co-coordinator is caring where he is mean. Where he is grumpy, she is friendly. And she's smart – smart enough to convince Otto to give her half the business when he gets behind in the wages.

== Production ==
=== Series 1 ===
In 1994, the Foundation set about developing a 13-part comedy series that was going to be titled The Genie from Down Under, featuring Bruce, an Australian genie, with his dog Blue. Jeremy Swan, a producer from the BBC spent a month during 1994 with the Foundation developing the scripts for the series. In the same year, the ACTF concluded a deal with the ABC and the BBC to produce the 13-part comedy-drama series, but Bruce's dog was replaced with the concept of Baz, his 8-year-old son. The BBC and the ABC's Children's Departments pre-bought the series. BBC Children's International and the Australian Film Finance Corporation invested in the series with the BBC acting as international distributor. The 13 episodes in the first series were written by Steve J. Spears, Christine Madafferi and Mandy Hampson with Esben Storm as Script Consultant. Jeremy Swan, the BBC's Script Consultant, was involved throughout the production. Jeremy is an experienced comedy writer-director of children's programs. Production of the first series commenced on 27 March 1995 and shooting was completed on 27 June 1995.

Filming took place at the Melbourne Film Studios, various locations in Melbourne, Werribee Park, and the Nulla Homestead. Werribee Park is the site of Townes Hall and the Nulla Homestead, in the heart of the Australian outback, is the site of Townes Downs. Post-production of the Foundation's 13-part comedy series was completed in November, with the series premiering on the BBC in January 1996 and on the ABC in June 1996.

The Foundation and the ABC hosted a press launch for The Genie from Down Under on 8 May 1996. The series premiered on BBCI in the United Kingdom on Mondays from 8 January 1996. The series began screening on the ABC every Monday at 5.00pm from 3 June 1996.

=== Series 2 ===
In 1996, the Foundation was in the early stages of development of a second 13-part series of The Genie from Down Under. Esben Storm worked with writers and performers from the first series to develop the initial concept. The series scripts were written by Philip Dalkin, Louise Fox and Esben Storm. The Foundation distributed the series internationally. Pre-production commenced in July 1997. The producers of the series are Patricia Edgar and Elizabeth Symes and they worked with the directors Aleksi Vellis, Stephen Johnson and Ray Boseley. Most of the major cast from the first series returned for the second series including Alexandra Milman as Penelope. Rhys Muldoon was not able to return for season 2 to play the Genie, so Sandy Winton took over the role. The second series was pre-sold to the ABC and the BBC.

Production started in September and filming once again took place at Werribee Park Mansion and locations in and around Melbourne. The second series was promoted at the MIP market in April 1997 and orders were placed from broadcasters who screened the first series to enthusiastic audiences. The completed series was delivered to the ABC in May 1998. The series commenced screening on the ABC on Monday 3 August 1998 at 5.00pm.

== Series overview ==
Series	Episodes	Originally released	
Series	Episodes	First released	Last released
1	13	3 June 1996	26 August 1996
2	13	3 August 1998	19 August 1998

=== Episodes ===
Episode information retrieved from Australian Television archive & IMDB.

==== Series 1 (1996) ====
No. overall	No. in series	Title	Directed by	Written by	Original release date
1	1	"Wishing and Hoping"	Esben Storm	Steve J. Spears	3 June 1996
2	2	"It's My Opal...and I’ll Cry If I Want To"	Jeremy Swan	Christine Madafferi	10 June 1996
3	3	"Where It's At"	Esben Storm	Christine Madafferi	17 June 1996
4	4	"Good Cop, Bad Genie"	Brendan Maher	Christine Madafferi	24 June 1996
5	5	"Customs"	Jeremy Swan	Jeremy Swan & Esben Storm	1 July 1996
6	6	"Larceny"	Brendan Maher	Steve J. Spears	8 July 1996
7	7	"The Eternal Quadrangle"	Esben Storm	Mandy Hampson	15 July 1996
8	8	"Nobody’s Perfect"	Brendan Maher	Christine Madafferi	22 July 1996
9	9	"The Triple Agent"	Esben Storm	Christine Madafferi	29 July 1996
10	10	"A Tale of Two Cities"	Jeremy Swan	Philip Dalkin	5 August 1996
11	11	"School Daze"	Esben Storm	Steve J. Spears	12 August 1996
12	12	"Triple Threat"	Jeremy Swan	Philip Dalkin	19 August 1996
13	13	"It's Still Magic"	Esben Storm	Steve J. Spears & Esben Storm	26 August 1996

==== Series 2 (1998) ====
No. overall	No. in series	Title	Directed by	Written by	Original release date
14	1	"I Do. You Do! Who Do?"	Aleksi Vellis	Esben Storm, Philip Dalkin & Louise Fox	3 August 1998
15	2	"The Photo Opportunity"	Ray Boseley	Esben Storm, Philip Dalkin & Louise Fox	4 August 1998
16	3	"The Cold Shoulder"	Aleksi Vellis	Esben Storm, Philip Dalkin & Louise Fox	5 August 1998
17	4	"Chase the Sun"	Stephen Johnson	Esben Storm, Philip Dalkin & Louise Fox	6 August 1998
18	5	"Peace in Our Time"	Ray Boseley	Esben Storm, Philip Dalkin & Louise Fox	7 August 1998
19	6	"Lord of the Nail Files"	Ray Boseley	Esben Storm, Philip Dalkin & Louise Fox	10 August 1998
20	7	"Baby Talk"	Aleksi Vellis	Esben Storm, Philip Dalkin & Louise Fox	11 August 1998
21	8	"My Better Half"	Aleksi Vellis	Esben Storm, Philip Dalkin & Louise Fox	12 August 1998
22	9	"Stock and Bonding"	Ray Boseley	Esben Storm, Philip Dalkin & Louise Fox	13 August 1998
23	10	"The Opal is a Boomerang"	Stephen Johnson	Esben Storm, Philip Dalkin & Louise Fox	14 August 1998
24	11	"The Heart of Country and Western"	Aleksi Vellis	Esben Storm, Philip Dalkin & Louise Fox	17 August 1998
25	12	"Otto Rules OK"	Ray Boseley	Esben Storm, Philip Dalkin & Louise Fox	18 August 1998
26	13	"The Last Wish"	Aleksi Vellis	Esben Storm, Philip Dalkin & Louise Fox	19 August 1998

== Telecast, marketing and media releases ==
=== Screenings ===
The Genie from Down Under screened from 3 June 1996 to 26 August 1996 every Monday at 5.00pm on the ABC.

The Disney Channel Australia screened The Genie from Down Under Series One at 6.00pm on Saturdays from 16 November 1997 until 15 February 1998.

Prior to the premiere screening of the second series, the ABC repeated the first series in July 1998, screening the program on weekdays at 10.55am. Only five months after its premiere, the ABC repeated the second series from February 1999 on Sunday mornings at 9.00am.

In 1999, the ABC screened the first series (for the third time) at 11.00am on weekday mornings during the school holidays from 28 June 1999 until 14 July 1999. The ABC also screened the second series (for the third time) at 5.00pm on weekdays from 30 August 1999 until 15 September 1999.

In 2000, the ABC screened the second series (for the fourth time) at 5.00pm on weekdays from 24 April 2000 until 10 May 2000.

In 2001, the ABC screened the first series on weekdays at 5.00pm from 4–20 October 2000. The ABC also screened the second series at 9.00am on Sunday mornings from 12 November 2000 – 28 January 2001. The Disney Channel screened the first series at 12.30pm on weekdays from 26 December 2000 – 11 January 2001 and screened the second series at 12.30pm on weekdays from 12 – 30 January 2001.

=== Sales ===
In 1997, BBC Worldwide sold The Genie from Down Under to broadcasters in Thailand, Israel, Cyprus, Greece, Malta, Switzerland, the Netherlands, Hong Kong, South Africa, Canada, Poland, Germany and Italy.

In 1998, BBC Worldwide sold the first series to Zone Vision of Poland, Tanweer Enlightenment of Kuwait and Islamic Republic of Iran Broadcasting company in 1998. The second series was also sold by the Foundation at MIP-TV in April 1998 where it concluded sales to the Icelandic National Broadcasting Service, Telewijza Polska, RTE Ireland, TV 2 Denmark and the Namibian Broadcasting Corporation.

In 1999, sales into Asia included Series 1 & 2 to Japan's public broadcaster, NHK, for screening at 6.25pm on Tuesday evenings over 26 weeks. The second series was sold to Television Broadcasts Limited Hong Kong and Caro Television in Sri Lanka acquired more episodes of Series 2. Sales into Europe included BBC Worldwide sales of the first series to BBC Prime (pay television), RTV Slovenia, Bulgarian National Television, Latvian television, the Swiss Broadcasting Corporation and ZDF Germany. The Foundation sold the second series to Television of Bosnia and Herzegovina, Canal J France, RTV Slovenia, Cyprus Broadcasting Corporation, radio Television Malta, and Lithuanian Television. The second series was sold to the Israel Broadcasting Authority.

In 2000, the first series was re-licensed to The Disney Channel Australia, which also acquired the second series for the first time. Both series were sold to the Educational Broadcasting System of Korea. The first series was also acquired by the BOP Broadcasting/SABC Satellite service of South Africa. The second series was sold to Vietnam Television and the Global Advanced Company of Kuwait.

In 2001, the BBC sold the first series to the South African Broadcasting Corporation's satellite service. Meanwhile, the Foundation sold the second series to K-TV in South Africa.

In 2002, both series were licensed by BBC Kids (Canada) and Pt Naina Film for Indonesia and Sri Lanka.

In 2003, both series were sold to Eagle Broadcasting Corporation (Philippines), Ambang Media (Malaysia), and US Advertisement (for Japanese English-language channel GLC). The first series was sold to BBC Canada, and Pt Spectrum Films (Indonesia).

In 2004, both series were sold to HBO (Czech Republic). The second series was also sold to Sveriges Television AB (Sweden).

Years later, both series were sold to Retro TV in the U.S.

=== Home media ===
Both series were released on VHS in the 1990s, two episodes per cassette, and DVDs were later made available to schools. Each series is now available for digital download via ACTF online.

As of 2023, both series were currently streaming on YouTube's "Twisted Lunchbox" channel.

=== Books ===
In April 1996, Penguin Books Australia published a novel to accompany the screening of The Genie from Down Under series on the ABC. The novel, written by Amanda Midlam, was also published in the United Kingdom to tie in with the screening of the series on BBCI at the beginning of 1996. In the first six months of 1996 15,000 copies of the novel were sold in Australia.

The book based on the second series was published by HarperCollins and was available from booksellers from August 1998.

== Reception ==
"The ACTF has made an artform out of producing high-spirited and imaginative family entertainment. And it has also forged a model for the independent Australian production company operating successfully, and with integrity, in the international marketplace, creating work that has universal appeal without fatally compromising its local identity." Debi Enker, The Sunday Age, View magazine, 22 June 1996

"the latest in a fine list of children's dramas made by the Australian Children's Television Foundation" Tom Gilling, The Bulletin

"take my word for it, it's good" Alison Stewart, Sydney Morning Herald

"parents won't have to tie themselves to the chair to share this one with the kids" Herald Sun

"great fun, with plenty of laughs and an engrossing story line" Neil Molloy, Sunday Mail

"The Genie From Down Under strikes just the right balance of humour and low-camp adventure. In fact, it's delightful." Simon Hughes, The Age

"The show is funny, well-acted and mercifully free of messages . . . children will love it. Adults are strongly advised to stay around, too." Jenny Tabakoff, Sydney Morning Herald, 3 August 1998

"All round approval for this story of a snobbish English girl who discovers by accident a laid-back Australian genie. A show that a young family can sit down and enjoy, it left us wanting to watch the next episode." – Radio Times, UK

". . . A knockabout comedy stuffed with entertaining and often ingenious effects." – Tom Gilling, The Bulletin

". . . real magic for children . . . The name of Esben Storm's work in Australian children's television should make him a national hero." – Dennis Pryor, The Age

Patricia Edgar was extremely pleased with the response to the series and excited about the fact that academics were beginning to analyse the Foundation's programs as "serious cultural product".

Leonie Rutherford argued for cultural research studies of Australian children's television using The Genie from Down Under to demonstrate the complexity and the layers that had been written into the classic battle of master against servant, adult against child, and the humour in the cultural differences generated by national stereotypes.

== Awards and nominations ==
The Genie from Down Under
Year	Nominated work	Award Event	Category	Result	Reference
1996	First series	Australian Teachers of media (ATOM) Awards, Melbourne	Children's Series	Finalist	
1996	First series	Australian Teachers of media (ATOM) Awards, Melbourne	Primary Student Judging Panel	Finalist	
1996	First series	Cairo international Film festival for Children, Egypt	_	Finalist	
1996	Wishing and Hoping	Banff Television Festival, Canada	_	Finalist	
1996	Wishing and Hoping	AFI Awards, Melbourne	Children's Drama Series	Nominated	
1998	First series	Prix Jeunesse, Munich	_	Finalist	
