= Willing and Abel =

Television series

- Created by: Lynn Bayonas; Ted Roberts
- Starring: Grant Dodwell; Shane Withington; Martin Vaughan; Rebecca Rigg; Lucius Borich; Simon Chilvers; Tina Bursill
- Country of origin: Australia
- No. of episodes: 26

Production
- Running time: 50 minutes

Original release
- Network: Nine Network
- Release: 1987

Willing and Abel is an Australian television comedy series which was made in 1987, about two handymen.

The main cast were Grant Dodwell as 'Charles Willing', Shane Withington as 'Abel Moore' and Rebecca Rigg as 'Angela Reddy'. Their names ('Reddy', 'Willing' and 'Abel') were a pun on the saying, "ready, willing and able".

It had problems in attaining an audience. The show was produced as a "comedy drama" however some at the Nine Network wanted to steer it to be a heavier drama. There was much discussion between production executives and the Network and not much agreement. One episode scripted by Ted Roberts dealt with a hostage situation at a bank, the pathos being reinforced by series characters caught up in the action.

The series dealt with contemporary issues in a subtle way, sometimes making observations through humour.

== Cast ==
=== Main ===
- Grant Dodwell as Charles Willing
- Shane Withington as Abel Moore
- Rebecca Rigg as Angela Reddy
- Lucius Borich as Parramatta Jones

=== Recurring ===
- Mark Mitchell as Sergeant Dobson
- Martin Vaughan as 'Just One' Moore
- Simon Chilvers as Pisani
- Tina Bursill as Margaret Hill

=== Guests ===
- Alan David Lee as Gary Conway
- Betty Lucas as Maisie
- Bryan Marshall
- Bryan Wiseman as Cassidy
- Deborah Kennedy
- Diane Craig
- Elli Maclure as Diana Dancer
- George Kapiniaris
- Gosia Dobrowolska
- Jon Fabian as Truckie
- Judith McGrath
- Justine Clarke
- Kate Sheil
- Leslie Dayman
- Maggie Dence
- Mary-Anne Fahey
- Melissa Bickerton as Peggy Porter
- Melissa Jaffer
- Nikki Coghill as Jenny
- Roger Ward as Mr Dancer
- Sharon Millerchip
- Simone Buchanan
- Susan Lyons
- Veronica Lang
- Wendy Playfair

== Broadcast ==
The series first aired in Australia on the Nine Network and years later went onto air in a number of other countries such as South Africa and Indonesia.
