= The Deb =

Australian musical

- Music: Megan Washington
- Lyrics: Megan Washington; Hannah Reilly
- Book: Hannah Reilly
- Setting: Dunburn, Australia
- Premiere: 8 April 2022: The Rebel Theatre, Sydney
- Productions: 2022 Sydney
- Awards: Sydney Theatre Award for Best Production for Young People

The Deb is a musical by Hannah Reilly with music by Megan Washington and lyrics by Washington & Reilly.

== Premise ==
The Deb concerns high school outcast Taylah, her feminist inner-city cousin Maeve and the annual debutante ball in the fictional drought-stricken country town of Dunburn, Australia. Reilly describes it as "a love letter to awkward teenage adolescence and learning how to celebrate what makes you unique”.

== Production ==
The original Australian Theatre for Young People production was staged from 8 April to 22 May 2022 at ATYP's The Rebel Theatre in Sydney's Walsh Bay Wharves Precinct. It was co-directed by Reilly and Fraser Corfield with choreographer Sally Dashwood and music director Zara Stanton. The cast included Katelin Koprivec (Taylah), Charlotte MacInnes (Maeve), Jay Laga'aia and Tara Morice.

== Reception ==
The Deb was positively received. The Guardian called it "an embrace and expansion of new trends in Australian musical comedy" and "a celebration of a new joyful onstage movement of women-centred, lovingly local stories with big laughs and big pop choruses". The Sydney Morning Herald noted "fine original music – from ballads, hip hop, country, and rap – with witty lyrics".

It received the Sydney Theatre Award for Best Production for Young People in 2023.

== Principal cast ==
Role	Performer
Taylah Simpkins	Katelin Koprivec
Maeve Brennan	Charlotte MacInnes
Mayor Jase	Jay Laga'aia
Shell	Tara Morice
Janette	Monique Sallé
Rick	Drew Livingston
Annabelle	Mariah Gonzalez
Chantelle	Georgia Anderson
Danielle	Jenna Woolley
Brayden	Carlo Boumouglbay
Damo	Amin Taylor
Mitch	Jack Wunsch

== Musical numbers ==
- "In the Spotlight"
- "Someone Brilliant"
- "Dust" – Mayor Jase and Rick
- "Coming Out"

== Film adaptation ==
The musical was adapted as a feature film with Rebel Wilson’s company Camp Sugar Productions. The film premiered as the closing film of the 2024 Toronto International Film Festival.
