= The Flamin' Thongs =

Australian animated series

- Written by: Simon Dodd; Bruce Griffiths; Tristan Jones
- Directed by: Kelly Lynagh
- Country of origin: Australia
- No. of series: 1
- No. of episodes: 26

Original release
- Network: ABC3
- Release: 9 May 2014

The Flamin' Thongs is an Australian children's animated television series screening on ABC3 from 9 May 2014. The 26 12-minute episodes (written by Simon Dodd and Bruce Griffiths) follow the plans of the dysfunctional Thong Family, as they try to put their small coastal hometown of Whale Bay on the map. The family consists of parents Trevor and Brenda, their 12-year-old son Holden and 14-year-old daughter Narelle. Holden's best friend, Rerp, is a cane toad in a school uniform. The family are depicted as a stereotypical 'Aussie' family with Australian slang and iconic objects included in the show.

== Cast ==
- Brandon Burns as Holden Thong
- Mark Mitchell as Trevor Thong
- Denise Drysdale as Brenda Thong (26 episodes, 2014)
- Kate McLennan as Narelle Thong
- André de Vanny as Kevin
- Tony Martin as various characters (8 episodes, 2014)
- Abbe Holmes
- Hamish Hughes
- Marg Downey
- Bob Franklin
- Rod Mullinar

== Episodes ==
No.	Title	Directed by	Written by	Original release date
1	"The Boy Who Cried Blowflyman"	Kelly Lynagh	Simon Dodd, Bruce Griffiths, & Tristan Jones	May 9, 2014
Holden tries to prove that Blowflyman is a real superhero with real powers by putting himself in a position where he must be saved.
2	"Nobody Likes a Smarthouse"	Kelly Lynagh	Simon Dodd, Bruce Griffiths, & Tristan Jones	May 9, 2014
Holden turns the Thongs' home into a remote-controlled smart house after he is grounded for being lazy; but the house is now too smart and tries to wipe out the Thongs.
3	"Up Swiss Creek Without a Paddle"	Kelly Lynagh	Simon Dodd, Bruce Griffiths, & Tristan Jones	May 9, 2014
As she attempts to be the first girl to pedal-boat to Switzerland, Naralle becomes delirious with the heat and mistakes Whale Bay for the Swiss Alps; Holden tries to walk around the world on giant inflatable thongs.
4	"Jurassic Dork"	Kelly Lynagh	Simon Dodd, Bruce Griffiths, & Tristan Jones	May 9, 2014
Holden unearths a Diprotodon skeleton, and creates a prehistoric wombat that begins to wreck Whale Bay.
5	"It Cooked from Outer Space"	Kelly Lynagh	Simon Dodd, Bruce Griffiths, & Tristan Jones	May 9, 2014
Narelle accidentally invites a family of Thong-eating aliens to lunch after Holden builds the universe's most powerful radio.
6	"Mooned"	Kelly Lynagh	Simon Dodd, Bruce Griffiths, & Tristan Jones	May 9, 2014
Narelle wants to become Australia's first female astronaut as Holden accidentally launches the whole family and their house on a collision course with the moon.
7	"Tunnel Vision"	Kelly Lynagh	Simon Dodd, Bruce Griffiths, & Tristan Jones	May 9, 2014
Trevor, Holden and Rerp end up trapped in a cave with a giant angry glow-worm as they dig a cross-town tunnel, and it's up to Narelle to save them. But she's busy barbecuing for Kevin.
8	"Howie the Yowie"	Kelly Lynagh	Simon Dodd, Bruce Griffiths, & Tristan Jones	May 9, 2014
Holden catches a big-footed yowie who's searching for his missing thong. The Thongs search for a solution to Howie's sore foot problem.
9	"Sand Blasted"	Kelly Lynagh	Simon Dodd, Bruce Griffiths, & Tristan Jones	May 9, 2014
When the beach mysteriously vanishes, Holden opens a wormhole between Whale Bay and The Great Sandy Desert to replace the sand. When he's unable to close the wormhole, the Thongs end up with more beach than they can handle.
10	"Cockroach Boy"	Kelly Lynagh	Simon Dodd, Bruce Griffiths, & Tristan Jones	May 9, 2014
After he eats a radioactive cockroach, Holden develops cockroach superpowers and Rerp tries to eat him. When Trevor builds the Leaning Thong of Whale Bay, Rerp uses it to capture the creepy-crawly superhero, Cockroach Boy.
11	"Bull Whipped"	Kelly Lynagh	Simon Dodd, Bruce Griffiths, & Tristan Jones	May 9, 2014
Trevor mistakenly orders a mechanical rodeo bull, meaning 'The Running of the Bulls' in Whale Bay can't happen.
12	"Snakes on a Boat"	Kelly Lynagh	Simon Dodd, Bruce Griffiths, & Tristan Jones	May 9, 2014
The Thongs add snakes to their whale watching tour to make it more interesting. The results are not what they expect when the snakes manage to escape.
13	"Train In Vain"	Kelly Lynagh	Simon Dodd, Bruce Griffiths, & Tristan Jones	May 9, 2014
Holden tries to avoid having to walk to school. He runs into problems when he tries to build a railway and forgets to add stops.
14	"Whale Blabber"	Kelly Lynagh	Simon Dodd, Bruce Griffiths, & Tristan Jones	May 9, 2014
Holden makes some promises that he has trouble keeping as he struggles to find a whale to show the tourists. He looks everywhere before finding one in an unexpected place.
15	"Planet of the Rerps"	Kelly Lynagh	Simon Dodd, Bruce Griffiths, & Tristan Jones	May 9, 2014
Holden invents a machine that can create dreams, but something goes horribly wrong when everyone ends up as a part of Rerp's dreams.
16	"The Curse of the Were-Bear"	Kelly Lynagh	Simon Dodd, Bruce Griffiths, & Tristan Jones	May 9, 2014
People in town start to turn into were-bears as a result of Holden's run-in with a koala. He and Narelle are tasked with the job of trying to turn them all back.
17	"Shark and Awe"	Kelly Lynagh	Simon Dodd, Bruce Griffiths, & Tristan Jones	May 9, 2014
Holden tries to attract dolphins and gets sharks instead, so he tries to train them using doughnuts. They become art connoisseurs who develop a taste for art - and the artists.
18	"20,000 Leaks Under the Sea"	Kelly Lynagh	Simon Dodd, Bruce Griffiths, & Tristan Jones	May 9, 2014
Holden finds a nuclear sub and Narelle sees an opportunity to flee Whale Bay, but she must cure Kevin's claustrophobia first.
19	"Dawn of the Weedies"	Kelly Lynagh	Simon Dodd, Bruce Griffiths, & Tristan Jones	May 9, 2014
Holden sets a metal detector trap to prove Weedy Kid is a robot but accidentally creates a cloning machine.
20	"A Fright at the Opera"	Kelly Lynagh	Simon Dodd, Bruce Griffiths, & Tristan Jones	May 9, 2014
Holden enlarges a seashell to be the Whale Bay Opera House using an alien device that has fallen from the sky.
21	"Freeze a Crowd"	Kelly Lynagh	Simon Dodd, Bruce Griffiths, & Tristan Jones	May 9, 2014
22	"World War Shoe"	Kelly Lynagh	Simon Dodd, Bruce Griffiths, & Tristan Jones	May 9, 2014
Holden invents a robotic footy boot. When it kicks a football halfway around the world, the Thongs get in trouble.
23	"Band All Over the World"	Kelly Lynagh	Simon Dodd, Bruce Griffiths, & Tristan Jones	May 9, 2014
Holden makes the world's loudest ever band for the Whale Bay festival, but the music ruptures the Earth's crust.
24	"Cindnarella"	Kelly Lynagh	Simon Dodd, Bruce Griffiths, & Tristan Jones	May 9, 2014
Narelle doesn't have a date for the Valentine's ball, so Holden turns Rerp into a handsome prince using a modified photocopier.
25	"Thongageddon"	Kelly Lynagh	Simon Dodd, Bruce Griffiths, & Tristan Jones	May 9, 2014
Holden turns the giant thong into a super strong electro magnet to change the course of Davo's asteroid, but it starts coming towards Whale Bay.
26	"Meat the Queen"	Kelly Lynagh	Simon Dodd, Bruce Griffiths, & Tristan Jones	May 9, 2014
The Thongs welcome the Queen by hosting a floating Aussie barbecue, but she thinks they are pirates so they must convince her otherwise.
