= The Man Who Shot the Albatross =

- Written by: Ray Lawler
- Directed by: David Zweck
- Starring: Leo McKern
- Country of origin: Australia
- Original language: English

Production
- Running time: 55 minutes
- Production company: ABC

Original release
- Network: ABC
- Release: 26 March 1972

The Man Who Shot the Albatross is a play by Ray Lawler about the Rum Rebellion, first performed in 1971 and turned into a 1972 TV movie featuring the same cast.

== Cast ==
- Leo McKern as Captain Bligh
- Michael Aitkens
- Frederick Parslow as MacArthur
- Deidre Rubenstein as Mary Putland
- John Ewart
- Gary Day
- Peter Norton
- John Orcsik
- Frank Thring as Judge Atkins
- Simon Chilvers
- Patricia Kennedy as Sarah Benson
- Malcolm Phillips

== Production ==
Ray Lawler's play premiered at the Princess Theatre for the Melbourne Theatre Company in 1971 and was directed by John Sumner. It marked Leo McKern's return to Australia after a number of years away. It was Lawler's first play produced in Australia for a number of years. The production toured around Australia.

The play was one two plays the ABC filmed in association with state theatre companies, with the goal of filming leading stage plays for a wider audience. Funds were provided in part from the Australia Council. According to The Bulletin: "Only a few years ago the ABC found the proposal anathema, sensing in it, perhaps, an excruciating potential for too many squashed toes. Yet arguments for the idea, backed by some recent advances in quality and popularity of local theatre, have eventually proved too strong." According to the Australia Council, the "new scheme is going to spread the best fruits of the two leading theatre companies more equitably across a nation which, after all, does help to support them".

The other stage production filmed in 1972 was the Old Tote's The Resistible Rise of Arturo Ui.

The play was considerably shortened for the television. It was presented with the assistance of the Australian Council for the Arts.

The ABC later filmed another play performed by the Melbourne Theatre Company, The Cherry Orchard.

== Reception ==
The Age called it "intolerably dull and ill-conceived". The Sydney Sun Herald thought it was "an improvement on the stage play" but was "somewhat disappointing" and not as good as older ABC serials like Stormy Petrel.
