= Razzle Dazzle: A Journey into Dance =

- DVD cover
- Directed by: Darren Ashton
- Written by: Robin Ince; Carolyn Wilson
- Produced by: Jodi Matterson; Andrena Finlay; Al Clark
- Starring: Ben Miller; Kerry Armstrong; Roy Billing; Tara Morice; Nadine Garner; Andrew McFarlane; Steve Le Marquand; Damon Gameau; Jane Hall
- Cinematography: Garry Phillips
- Edited by: Julie-Anne De Ruvo; Philip Horn
- Distributed by: Palace Films
- Release date: 15 March 2007
- Running time: 95 minutes
- Country: Australia
- Language: English

Razzle Dazzle: A Journey into Dance is a 2007 Australian mockumentary comedy film directed by Darren Ashton about competitive dance, first screened on 15 March 2007.

== Synopsis ==
Mr Jonathan (Ben Miller) runs a dance class in which he attempts to comment on social issues. After his team is accepted into a national dance competition, he must come up with a winning and socially relevant routine to beat out an elite dance team.

== Cast ==
- Ben Miller as Mr Jonathan
- Kerry Armstrong as Justine Morgan
- Shayni Notelovitz as Tenille
- Sheridan Rynne as Vanessa
- Kerry-Ann Thoo as Millie
- Anastasia Dolan as Katie
- Lauren Elton as Leanne
- Taylor Anthony as Madison
- Veronica Koprivnjak as Lorraine
- Becky Mamo as Emma
- Samantha Hagen as Courtney
- Shayarne Matheson as Olivia
- Ivy Negre as Danielle
- Caitlin Rawnsley as Jenny
- Clancy Ryan as Grace
- Sallyann Ryan as Pip
- Carolyn Wilson as Kaye
- Denise Roberts as Barbara
- Greg Farrell as Calliper Boy
- Tara Morice as Marianne
- Jane Hall as Miss Elizabeth
- Nadine Garner as Paulette
- Toni Lamond as Sherry Leonard
- Noeline Brown as Leonara Biviano
- Barry Crocker as Donnie Destry
- Damon Gameau as Neil
- Steve Le Marquand as Bob
- Robin Ince as Frank
- Barry Henry as Caretaker
- Scott Irwin as Patrick
- Niki Owen as Debbie
- Eliza Logan as Nerida
- Roy Billing as Arthur Rudd
- Amelia Ashton as Vomit Child
- Rachel Gordon as Vomit Child's Mother ("Rachael" in credits)
- Scott Johnson aa Vomit Child's Father
- Belinda Stewart-Wilson as Meredith
- Beth Champion as Tamara
- Deborah Galanos as Hot Shoe Mother
- Andrew McFarlane as Trevor Morgan
- Helmut Bakaitis as Plastic Surgeon
- Paul Mercurio as Self
- Nick Twiney as Tyson
- Susie Lindeman as Miss Jodi
- Leo Sayer as Himself
- Michael Peschardt as Interviewer
- Jazzketeers
- Lisa Hensley as Harridan woman (uncredited)

== Box office ==
Razzle Dazzle: A Journey into Dance grossed $1,640,644 at the box office in Australia, trailing the comedy films Wild Hogs and Hot Fuzz.

== See also ==
- Cinema of Australia
