= The Deb (film) =

2024 film by Rebel Wilson

- Theatrical release poster
- Directed by: Rebel Wilson
- Screenplay by: Hannah Reilly
- Based on: The Deb by: Hannah Reilly; Meg Washington
- Produced by: Rebel Wilson; Amanda Ghost; Gregor Cameron; Greer Simpkin; David Jowsey
- Starring: Natalie Abbott; Charlotte MacInnes; Stevie Jean; Tara Morice; Steph Tisdell; Costa D'Angelo; Hal Cumpston; Julian McMahon; Shane Jacobson; Rebel Wilson
- Cinematography: Ross Emery
- Edited by: Jane Moran
- Music by: Michael Yezerski (score); Hannah Reilly (lyrics); Meg Washington (music)
- Production companies: AI Film; Camp Sugar; Unigram
- Distributed by: Rialto Distribution
- Release dates: 15 September 2024 (Toronto); 9 April 2026 (Australia)
- Running time: 120 minutes
- Country: Australia
- Language: English
- Budget: $22 million
- Box office: $239,640

The Deb is a 2024 Australian musical film directed by Rebel Wilson based on the stage musical of the same name.

== Premise ==
From the Screen Australia website: "The Deb follows lovable farm girl and high school outcast Taylah Simpkins, who is certain the upcoming Debutante Ball, 'the Deb', is her one chance to redefine herself. When her cynical city cousin Maeve is exiled to Taylah's drought-stricken town Dunburn, she thinks the ball is a 'heteronormative shit-show' and immediately disrupts the status quo. In their search for the spotlight, Taylah and Maeve dig deep to find self-acceptance — and a date to the Deb."

== Cast ==
- Natalie Abbott as Taylah Simpkins
- Charlotte MacInnes as Maeve Barker
- Tara Morice as Shell
- Steph Tisdell as Dimity
- Costa D'Angelo as Dusty
- Hal Cumpston as Mitch
- Shane Jacobson as Rick
- Rebel Wilson as Janette
- Brianna Bishop as Danielle
- Karis Oka as Chantelle
- Stevie Jean as Annabelle
- Susan Prior as Tish, Maeve's mother
- Julian McMahon as the Prime Minister of Australia

== Production ==
The stage show premiered in 2022. Filming commenced in September 2023.

Wilson was inspired by Australian films such as The Adventures of Priscilla, Queen of the Desert and Muriel's Wedding. "I really like seeing my culture on screen," she said. "[Those films are] very seminal to me and I really wanted to create a movie that was like the modern version of those. Those movies have such charm, they're so colourful, and they're very funny. And they have real heart to them."

== Release ==
The Deb premiered on 15 September 2024 as the closing film of the 2024 Toronto International Film Festival. In October 2025, it was announced that Australian company Rialto Distributions would release the film in Australia and New Zealand on January 15, 2026. On the scheduled release date AI Film pushed the date to 9 April 2026, amid legal disputes.

It grossed $226,848 in Australia and $12,792 in New Zealand, for a total of $239,640.

== Reception ==
On the review aggregator website Rotten Tomatoes, 85% of 26 critics' reviews are positive, with an average rating of 6.3/10. Metacritic, which uses a weighted average, assigned the film a score of 53 out of 100, based on 7 critics, indicating "mixed or average" reviews.

== Legal dispute ==
In July 2024, Wilson accused some of the film's producers of blocking the film's debut at the Toronto International Film Festival (TIFF), further accusing them—specifically Amanda Ghost, Gregor Cameron and Vince Holden—of "bad behavior" including "inappropriate behavior towards the lead actress of the film" and "embezzling funds from the film's budget" along with "absolute viciousness and retaliatory behavior". These claims were denied by the producers in question.

In the ensuing defamation court filings and proceedings, the producers claimed that Wilson had lied in an attempt to secure the film's release at TIFF. The producers were concerned about releasing the film at a festival during ongoing disputes about the future of the film's music licensing and Wilson's ongoing attempts to secure a writing credit, after it was denied by the Australian Writers' Guild. Wilson had only been granted an "additional writing by" credit by the guild, with the script being accredited to Hannah Reilly, a recipient of Wilson's theatre scholarship, who had written the original stage musical and screenplay. The producers also claimed Wilson had confessed to lying about the allegations privately made against Ghost alongside the business disputes in October 2023.

In her own counter lawsuit, Wilson alleged Ghost "forced MacInnes to live in her Bondi Beach penthouse apartment with her" where "Ghost took a shower and a bath with MacInnes". Wilson also claimed that Ghost made "overtly sexual remarks to MacInnes on set".

During the film's pre-production period, the lead actress Charlotte MacInnes stayed in an apartment with the producer, Amanda Ghost and their assistant, Pia Ashcroft. After Ghost had a medical episode as a result of exposure to cold water at Bondi Beach, Ghost and MacInnes returned to the apartment. According to court proceedings, Ghost ran a shower, while MacInnes sat nearby in a bath. Ashcroft prepared both of them a warm beverage. Ghost later joined MacInnes in the bath while she was recovering. Both were said to be wearing swimsuits. Ghost allegedly asked Ashcroft and MacInnes to leave the room when she was feeling better.

When later asked by Wilson's Lawyer about how she described the event to Wilson, MacInnes claimed she never stated she was uncomfortable, but agreed she may have described the incident to Wilson as "weird" or "strange and bizarre".

In November 2024, Wilson lost a motion in a Californian court to protect herself from the film's producers' defamation lawsuit under anti-SLAPP laws. Wilson had claimed that her allegations against the producers had been in the public interest. However, the judge found they were "made in the context of [her] private business dispute" and that despite some of the allegations being criminal in nature, Wilson had not sought any criminal prosecution.

In May 2025, Wilson received attention in the press after she made a series of disparaging posts on The Deb's Instagram account about MacInnes, who was performing on a yacht at the 2025 Cannes Film Festival. Wilson captioned a video of the performance, "Charlotte MacInnes in a culturally inappropriate Indian outfit on Len Blavatnik's luxury yacht in Cannes—ironically singing a song from a movie that will never get released because of her lies and support for the people blocking the film's release". The film's writer Hannah Reilly also spoke out against the controversies unfolding around the film.

In July, one of the companies which produced The Deb in partnership with Wilson, AI Film, filed a case in the NSW Supreme Court claiming that Wilson had blocked the release of the film due to the status of her US court case and "threatened the Australian distributor of the film that she would obtain an injunction to prevent its release, breaching her contractual duties and causing the distributor to withdraw its offer". The suit also alleged the motive behind Wilson's actions were to devalue the production's worth and pressure the other companies involved in the film into selling their stake to Wilson's company Camp Sugar. Wilson denied the claims, stating "I want nothing more than to have this film released".

During August, MacInnes' lawyer issued Wilson with a defamation concerns notice, alleging that Wilson's posts had contained lies including "that she (MacInnes) changed her story about being sexually harassed by a producer after being cast in another production and given a record deal."

In November 2025, Wilson appeared on 60 Minutes to address the court cases. Wilson denied the claims in defamation suits against her and rejected claims she had orchestrated a smear campaign against Ghost, which claimed Ghost was a “sex trafficker” and “Indian Ghislaine Maxwell.” Ghost, Cameron, Holden and MacInnes refused to appear, citing impropriety of doing so during legal proceedings.

In April 2026, the defamation proceeding between MacInnes and Wilson began in the Federal Court of Australia. On 22 July 2026, Federal Court of Australia Justice Elisabeth Raper cleared Wilson of both defamation and breach of confidence, dismissed the case, and decreed that Wilson's legal costs be paid by MacInnes. Barristers for MacInnes confirmed that an appeal of the decision of the Federal Court of Australia would be made.
