= Kylie Mole =

- First appearance: The Comedy Company
- Created by: Mary-Anne Fahey
- Portrayed by: Mary Anne Fahey

In-universe information
- Occupation: Student

Kylie Mole is a fictional character created by Australian actress and comedienne Mary-Anne Fahey. Kylie Mole is a scowling schoolgirl on The Australian TV show, The Comedy Company.

The character popularised the Australian vernacular, with terms such as Bogan gaining more currency.

As well as performing monologue comedy segments on The Comedy Company, Mole interviewed various celebrities, including Julian Lennon, Sylvester Stallone, the band INXS and Kylie Minogue.

Kylie Mole was also featured in the second series of the ABC's Kittson Fahey television show in 1993. In 2002, sixty minutes of footage of The Comedy Company was edited into a special called The Comedy Company: So Excellent, the subtitle referencing a famed line by the Kylie Mole character.

== Discography ==
=== Singles ===
Year	Title	Peak chart positions	Album
Year	Title	AUS	Album
1988	"So Excellent" / "I Go I Go"	8	The Comedy Company Album

== Awards and nominations ==
=== ARIA Music Awards ===
The ARIA Music Awards are a set of annual ceremonies presented by Australian Recording Industry Association (ARIA), which recognise excellence, innovation, and achievement across all genres of the music of Australia. They commenced in 1987.

Year	Nominee / work	Award	Result	Ref.
1989	"So Excellent" / "I Go I Go"	Best Comedy Release	Nominated	
