= Susan Provan =

Australian performing arts producer

Susan Mary Provan AO is an Australian performing arts producer, who was director of the Melbourne International Comedy Festival from 1994 to 2026.

== Early life and education ==
Susan Mary Provan studied a Bachelor of Arts at the University of Melbourne.

== Career ==
Provan credits comedy producer John Pinder and his business partner Roger Evans with giving her her first job in comedy, and for introducing her to Circus Oz. She became the manager of the Last Laugh Theatre, a restaurant and comedy venue in Melbourne run by Pinder and Evans from 1976 until the mid-1980s.

In 1985 Provan joined Circus Oz as general manager. In 1993, she became an associate producer at the State Theatre Company of South Australia, before taking up the directorship of the Melbourne International Comedy Festival in 1994.

After thirty years as Comedy Festival Director, Provan said she was thinking about leaving the role in 2025, saying she couldn't stay on "forever". She had started discussing plans for her eventual departure with the Festival Board, though a timeline had not been decided. She officially announced she was stepping down in late April 2026, following the festival's fortieth anniversary. A new Director is expected to be announced by August 2026.

== Recognition ==
- 2017: Added to the Victorian Honour Roll of Women
- 2018: Officer of the Order of Australia in the 2018 Queen's Birthday Honours, "for distinguished service to arts administration through festival leadership and governance, to the tourism sector in Victoria, and to the promotion of Australian comedy"
