= The Hoopla =

Australian news and opinion website

- Company type: Private
- Website type: News
- Available in: English
- Headquarters: {{{location_country}}}
- Area served: Worldwide
- Founders: Wendy Harmer and Jane Waterhouse
- Website: thehoopla.com.au

The Hoopla was an Australian news and opinion website founded by Wendy Harmer and Jane Waterhouse, active from 2011 to 2015. In almost four years, The Hoopla published 5000 articles from 300 writers.

== History ==
The Hoopla was launched in mid-2011 to present "news through the eyes of women" to women over 35 whose children were grown, or who had never had children. At the time, many websites targeted towards women were parenting websites. A sister website, Birdee, was aimed at younger women.

Citing a lack of advertising revenue as advertisers were reluctant to spend money targeting over-50s, the website introduced a hard paywall in April 2014 making articles accessible to subscribers only. This saw subscriptions plateau and visits slump. The paywall was later softened in October 2014 and subscriptions began growing by 20% month to month to 5000 overall.

On 23 March 2015, Wendy Harmer announced in a post at website that The Hoopla would cease publication, citing increased competition from big players and her desire to pay contributors fairly. The website's previously published articles are available through the Wayback Machine.
