= Dogwoman =

Australian television series

Dogwoman is a series of Australian television telemovies screened on the Nine Network in 2000. The telemovies were created by and starred Magda Szubanski as Margaret O'Halloran. Margaret, a professional dog trainer, is drawn into a world of mystery, intrigue, and murder, which lies beneath the surface of dog-owners. Tara Morice played her sister Pauline O'Halloran and Raj Ryan played her boyfriend Brian Jayasinghe.

The telemovies were produced by Beyond Simpson Le Mesurier, who also produced such series as Halifax f.p. and Stingers.

== Titles ==
There were three telemovies produced in the series:

- Dogwoman: The Legend of Dogwoman
- Dogwoman: A Grrrl's Best Friend
- Dogwoman: Dead Dog Walking

== Cast ==
- Magda Szubanski as Margaret O'Halloran
- Tara Morice as Pauline O'Halloran
- Raj Ryan as Brian Jayasinghe

== Guests ==
- Alison Whyte as Jacinta Davies
- Susie Dee as Lorraine O'Halloran
- Frank Magree as Ray Davies
- Leo Taylor as Arthur O'Halloran
- Paul Gleeson as Don Groom
- Andrew Blackman as Mac (Paul) McDonald
- Tiriel Mora as Supt. Gary Brodziak
- Alicia Gardiner as Varna O'Halloran
- Simon Lyndon as Matt Hayduke
- Sandy Winton as Jeremy Maitland
- Anthony Simcoe as Andrew Bell
- Anne Phelan as Joan Jarvis
- Gandhi Macintyre as Mr Jayosinghe
- Arianthe Galani as Mrs Jayosinghe
- Mark Mitchell as Prologue Narrator
- Peta Brady as Parsley
- Tony Rickards as Steve Finlay

== See also ==
- List of Australian television series
