= Tara Morice =

Australian actress (born 1964)

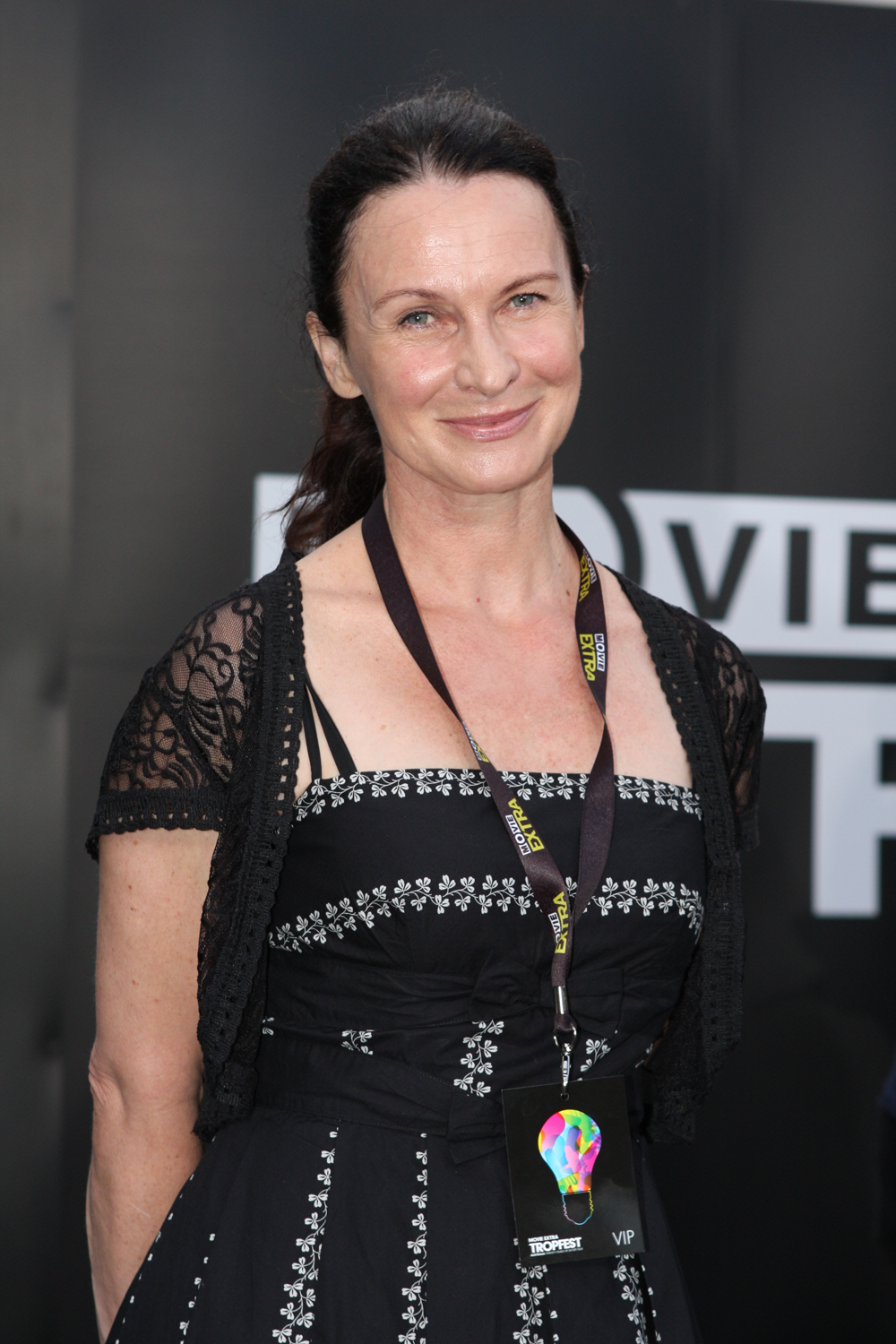
- Morice in 2012
- Born: 23 June 1964 (age 62); Hobart, Tasmania, Australia
- Education: Australian National University; National Institute of Dramatic Art (1987)
- Occupations: Actress; singer; dancer
- Years active: 1980–present
- Children: 1

Tara Morice (born 23 June 1964) is an Australian actress, singer and dancer.

== Background ==
Born in Hobart, Tasmania, Morice also lived in Sydney, Alice Springs and Adelaide as a child, attending seven different schools. She is a fifth-generation Australian and is of English, Irish, Scottish, Latvian and French ancestry. She appeared in a short film for the Tasmanian Film Corporation in 1980, The ABC of Unions. She made her stage debut at Australia's oldest theatre, the Theatre Royal in Hobart in The Diary of Anne Frank, aged 16. She holds a Bachelor of Arts in Australian History and English from the Australian National University and graduated from the National Institute of Dramatic Art in 1987.

== Career ==
She has worked extensively on stage in Australia, including productions for the Sydney Theatre Company, Bell Shakespeare Company, Griffin Theatre Company, Belvoir Theatre Company, State Theatre Company of South Australia, Queensland Theatre Company, Malthouse and the Ensemble.

Tara played Fran in Strictly Ballroom when it premiered as a stage play in 1988, and she was a member of Baz Luhrmann's 'Six Years Old' Company.

For her work in musical theatre, she has been nominated for Best Supporting Actress in a Musical for Fat Swan at the 2012 Helpmann Awards and a Victorian Green Room Award for The Venetian Twins.

Her first film appearance was as Fran in the 1992 film Strictly Ballroom (directed by Baz Luhrmann), for which she was nominated for a BAFTA award for Best Actress in a Leading Role and an Australian Film Institute award. Morice also appeared on the film's soundtrack, singing a duet of Time After Time with Mark Williams.

Morice has also appeared in the feature films Metal Skin, Hotel Sorrento, Hildegarde, Moulin Rouge!, Candy, Razzle Dazzle: A Journey Into Dance, Oranges and Sunshine, Dance Academy: The Movie, Peter Rabbit 2 and The Moogai. Her many short films include the Oscar nominated Miracle Fish.

Her television work includes roles in Answered by Fire, After the Deluge, Salem's Lot and McLeod's Daughters. Morice had a starring role in the series of three Dogwoman telemovies with Magda Szubanski in 2000. She also plays Miss Raine in Series 1, 2 and 3 of Dance Academy for ABC/ZDF.

She wrote and directed the documentary My Biggest Fan, about her correspondence and friendship with an American great-grandmother, Mildred Levine, who wrote to her after seeing Strictly Ballroom. The film premiered at the Fort Lauderdale International Film Festival, and was broadcast on the SBS network in Australia in 2008.

She re-recorded Time After Time for Baz Luhrmann's album Something for Everybody and sang on the Strictly Ballroom, Razzle Dazzle: A Journey Into Dance and My Biggest Fan soundtracks.

Tara played Shell in the premiere of the Australian musical The Deb at the Rebel Theatre in Sydney 2022. She then appeared in the feature film version directed by Rebel Wilson, the World Premiere of which was held at the 2024 Toronto International Film Festival.

In 2024 Morice was named in the cast for Stan Australia feature film Nugget is Dead. Morice was also named in the extended cast for ABC series Return to Paradise.

In 2026, Tara returns to the stage in the world premiere of Suzie Miller's Strong Is The New Pretty for Sydney Theatre Company, Brisbane Festival and Trish Wadley Productions.

== Filmography ==
=== Film ===
Year	Title	Role	Notes
1992	Strictly Ballroom	Fran	Feature film
1994	Metal Skin	Savina	Feature film
1995	Hotel Sorrento	Pippa Moynihan	Feature film
1997	Square One	Margot	Feature film
2000	Dogwoman: Dead Dog Walking	Pauline O'Halloran	TV film
2000	Dogwoman: A Grrrl's Best Friend	Pauline O'Halloran	TV film
2001	Dogwoman: The Legend of Dogwoman	Pauline O'Halloran	TV film
2001	Moulin Rouge!	Prostitute	Feature film
2001	My Husband, My Killer	Margaret Inkster	TV film
2001	Hildegarde	Kim Powell	
2003	After the Deluge	Dianne	TV film
2004	Loot	Karen Doakes	TV film
2005	Second Chance	Edwinda	TV film
2006	Candy	Aunt Katherine	Feature film
2007	Razzle Dazzle: A Journey into Dance	Marianne	Mockumentary film
2007	September	Jennifer Hamilton	Feature film
2008	Close Distance	Rivka	Short film
2009	Miracle Fish	Mum	Short film
2010	Oranges and Sunshine	Pauline	Feature film
2013	101 Cupcakes	Agnes Harvey	Short film
2014	Smithston	Mrs. Smithston	Short film
2017	Dance Academy: The Movie	Lucinda Raine	Feature film
2021	Peter Rabbit 2	Officiant	Feature film
2021	The Butter Scene		Short film
2022	The Home Team	Glenrose Rose	Short film
2023	Carmen	Marie	Feature film
2024	Nugget is Dead	Josephine	
2024	The Moogai	Annette	Feature Film
2025	Sandtrap	Anne	
2026	The Deb	Shell	Feature Film

=== Television ===
Year	Title	Role	Notes
1991	Police Rescue	Jenny	TV series, episode: "Mates"
1997	Big Sky	Linda	TV series, episode: "Blind Spot"
1998	Water Rats	Anne Milner	TV series, episode: "Diminished Responsibility"
1998	A Difficult Woman	Susan Taylor	TV miniseries
1999	Wildside	Rachel Duncan	TV series, episode: "2.11"
2000	Something in the Air	Candy Rogers	TV series
2000-03	Grass Roots	Julie Dunkley	TV series
2004	Salem's Lot	Joyce Petrie	TV miniseries
2005	Blue Heelers	Melanie Anderson	TV series
2005	McLeod's Daughters	Michelle Hall-Smith	TV series, episodes: "Out of Time", "Betwixt and Between"
2006	Answered by Fire	Helen Waldman	TV miniseries
2010	Home and Away	Joanna Scott	TV series
2010-13	Dance Academy	Miss Raine	TV series
2013	The Elegant Gentleman's Guide to Knife Fighting	Special Guest	TV series, episodes: "1.4", "1.5"
2013	Whitlam: The Power and the Passion	Margaret Whitlam (Voice)	TV miniseries, episode: "Part 2"
2015	Winter	Judith Johansson	TV series
2016	Rake	Pauline	TV series, 1 episode
2023	Ten Pound Poms	Ward Sister Mulligan	TV series, 2 episodes
2023	While the Men are Away	Enid	TV series, 4 episodes
2024	Return to Paradise	Helen Haddon	TV series, 1 episode

== Stage ==
Year	Title	Role	Notes
1981	The Diary of Anne Frank	Anne Frank	Theatre Royal, Hobart
1985	The Cherry Orchard		NIDA Theatre
1986	Thark		NIDA Theatre
1986	The Winter’s Tale	Emilia / Dorcas	NIDA Parade Theatre
1987	Under a Weeping Sky		NIDA Parade Theatre
1987	The Big Shiny Frock Show		NIDA Parade Theatre
1987	A Journey Through Peer Gynt		NIDA Parade Theatre, Canberra Theatre
1988	1841		Playhouse, Adelaide with STCSA for Adelaide Festival, Sydney Opera House with STC
1988	Haircut		Wharf Studio Theatre, Sydney with STC
1988	Strictly Ballroom	Fran	Wharf Studio Theatre with STC
1988	Angels		Wharf Studio Theatre, Sydney with STC
1989	After Dinner		Stables Theatre, Sydney with Griffin Theatre Company
1990	The Venetian Twins	Columbina	Suncorp Theatre, Brisbane & University of Sydney with Queensland Theatre Company, Playhouse, Melbourne with MTC Nominated for a Green Room Award for Female Actor in a Featured Role (Music Theatre)
1990	The Development Site		Sydney Theatre Company
1990	Rome Tremble – Crumbs from a Feast of Callas	Maria Callas	Wharf Theatre, Sydney with Sydney Theatre Company
1991	Mongrels	Lydia	Ensemble Theatre, Sydney
1992	Richard III	Lady Anne	Lyric Theatre, Brisbane, Theatre Royal, Sydney, Newcastle Civic Theatre, Melbourne Athenaeum, Canberra Theatre, Theatre Royal, Hobart with Bell Shakespeare
1992	The Merchant of Venice	Portia	Lyric Theatre, Brisbane, Newcastle Civic Theatre, Theatre Royal, Sydney, Melbourne Athenaeum, Canberra Theatre, Theatre Royal, Hobart with Bell Shakespeare
1992	Hamlet	Voltemand / 2nd Player	Lyric Theatre, Brisbane, Newcastle Civic Theatre, Theatre Royal, Sydney, Melbourne Athenaeum, Canberra Theatre with Bell Shakespeare
1995	The Moonwalkers	Gina	Stables Theatre, Sydney with Griffin Theatre Company
1996	Wolf Lullaby	Angela	Stables Theatre, Sydney with Griffin Theatre Company
1997	Mortimer's Miscellany		Sydney Festival
1998	Love for Love	Mrs Foresight	Sydney Opera House with Sydney Theatre Company
1999	Secret Bridesmaids' Business	Angela	Malthouse Theatre with Company Playbox Theatre Company, Wharf Theatre, Sydney with STC
2000	Sweet Road	Jo	SBW Independent Theatre, Sydney with Ensemble Theatre
2001	The Laramie Project	Zackie Salmon / Reggie Flutey / Trish Stegar, Kelli Simpkins / Sherry Aenonson / Kerry Drake & others	Belvoir Street Theatre
2001	Morning Sacrifice	Gwyn	Wharf Theatre, Sydney, with STC
2002	Spinning into Butter	Dean Sarah Daniels	Ensemble Theatre, Sydney
2002	Love Letters	Melissa Gardner	NIDA Parade Theatre
2009	Abigail's Party	Angela	Ensemble Theatre, Sydney
2010	Animals Out of Paper	Illana Andrews	Ensemble Theatre, Sydney
2011	Fat Swan	Mother	Arts Centre Melbourne, Seymour Centre, Sydney; Nominated for a Helpmann Award for Best Supporting Actress
2011	An Officer and a Gentleman	Esther	Sydney Lyric Theatre with Gordon Frost Organisation
2014	Once in Royal David's City	Teacher / Crowd / Chorus	Belvoir Street Theatre
2016	Good People	Margaret	Ensemble Theatre, Sydney
2018	The Harp in the South	Miss Sheily / Sister Beatrix / Alf / Flo / Shirley / Mrs X / Mrs Kilroy	Sydney Theatre Company
2018	Good Cook. Friendly. Clean.	Sandra	Stables Theatre, Sydney with Griffin Theatre Company
2018	A Cheery Soul	Mrs Lilie / Second Girl / Soprano Voice	Sydney Opera House with STC
2020	Dance Nation	Sofia	Scott Theatre, Adelaide with STCSA for Adelaide Festival, Belvoir Street Theatre
2021	Claudel	Madame Claudel	Tinderbox Productions
2021	The Museum of Modern Love: Open Rehearsal and Reading	Lydia	Seymour Centre, Sydney
2022	The Museum of Modern Love	Lydia	Seymour Centre, Sydney for Sydney Festival
2022	The Deb	Shell	Rebel Theatre, Sydney
2022	The Tenant of Wildfell Hall	Rachel/ Mrs Markham / Aunt	Roslyn Packer Theatre
2025	Menopause The Musical	Professional Woman	State Theatre, Sydney
