= The Comedy Company =

- The Comedy Company logo
- Genre: Sketch comedy
- Created by: Ian McFadyen
- Written by: Rob Caldwell; Mary-Anne Fahey
- Directed by: Jo Lane; Ian McFadyen
- Starring: Mark Mitchell; Mary-Anne Fahey; Ian McFadyen; Glenn Robbins; Kim Gyngell; Russell Gilbert; Peter Rowsthorn; Tim Smith; Siobhan Tuke; Chris Keogh; Paula Gardner
- Country of origin: Australia
- Original language: English
- No. of seasons: 3

Production
- Production locations: Melbourne, Australia
- Production company: Media Arts Company

Original release
- Network: Network Ten
- Release: 16 February 1988 – 11 November 1990

The Comedy Company is an Australian sketch comedy television series that aired from 16 February 1988 until 11 November 1990 on Network Ten. It was created and directed by cast member Ian McFadyen, and co-directed and produced by Jo Lane.

The show largely consisted of sketch comedy in short segments, much in the tradition of earlier sketch comedy shows such as The Mavis Bramston Show, The Naked Vicar Show and The D-Generation and featured cast members from the latter two shows. The majority of the filming took place in Melbourne.

The show and characters had a significant effect on Australian pop culture, and had a cult following particularly with Australian youth.

== History ==
The Comedy Company was created by Ian McFadyen in 1987, when Network Ten asked the Media Arts Company to produce a one-hour-a-week comedy program. The series premiered in February 1988 and within a few months became the most successful comedy program of the decade. It often rated as the highest rated weekly television program, which was particularly of note since it broadcast on Sunday evenings up against the Nine Network's popular current affairs show 60 Minutes. Much of its success was due to it being the only family entertainment on television on a Sunday night. The Comedy Company remained the consistently highest rating weekly television program for two years.

The third and final series was titled The New Comedy Company and featured a mostly new cast, though some of the original cast also returned. This version (and by extension, the show) was cancelled within a year.

In 2002, an hour of clips from The Comedy Company was edited into a special called The Comedy Company: So Excellent, with the subtitle referencing a famed line by Mary Anne Fahey's character Kylie Mole .

== Characters ==
The series launched several popular characters including schoolgirl Kylie Mole, terminally unemployed Col'n Carpenter, bumbling elderly pensioner Uncle Arthur and most especially greengrocer Con the Fruiterer.

Mark Mitchell would continue to play Con the Fruiterer, a Greek Australian greengrocer, for many years on and off television, including in an advertising campaign urging Australians to eat more fruit in 2010.

The word "bogan" was popularised by Mary-Anne Fahey's Kylie Mole character, a scowling schoolgirl who also interviewed various celebrities. Kylie Mole would also feature in the second series of the ABC series Kittson Fahey in 1993.

Glenn Robbins often did public appearances as his The Comedy Company character Uncle Arthur, and on The Panel he often referenced The Comedy Company by periodically slipping in and out of the character. He appeared in full costume as Arthur for The Panel Christmas Special in 2005.

== Cast and characters ==
- Mark Mitchell as Con the Fruiterer, Marika, Glenn Gelding
- Mary-Anne Fahey as Kylie Mole, Jophesine, Sharon Maclaren
- Ian McFadyen as David Rabbitborough
- Glenn Robbins as Uncle Arthur/Gary Dare, Darren Maclaren
- Kim Gyngell as Col'n Carpenter
- Russell Gilbert as Russ the Postie
- Peter Rowsthorn - as various characters
- Tim Smith - various characters
- Siobhan Tute
- Christine Keogh
- Paula Gardner

=== Celebrity guests ===
The Comedy Company was well-known for featuring national and international stars appearing as guests throughout the series including: Julian Lennon, INXS, Kylie Minogue, Jason Donovan, Annie Jones and Sigrid Thornton. Con the Fruiterer even met the then-Australian Prime Minister Bob Hawke in one episode on the show.

== Merchandising ==
The series launched quite a large amount of merchandise for a comedy show, including the books The Comedy Company Holiday Book, My Diary by Kylie Mole, and Con's Bewdiful Australia, as well as T-shirts, dolls and music albums (see below).

== Discography ==
=== Albums ===
Year	Album details	Peak chart positions
Year	Album details	AUS
1988	The Comedy Company Album: Released: November 1988; Label: CBS (462994)	9
1989	Comedy Company Classics: Released: November 1989; Label: CBS (466119)	98

=== Singles ===
Year	Title	Peak chart positions	Album
Year	Title	AUS	Album
1988	"So Excellent / I Go I Go" (by Kylie Mole)	8	The Comedy Company Album
1988	"A Cuppla Days" (by Con the Fruiterer)	48	The Comedy Company Album

=== DVDs ===
A DVD box set has been released including four DVDs with select clips from the series, the four DVDs are;

- The Best of the Comedy Company Volume 1
- The Best of the Comedy Company Volume 2
- The Best of Con the Fruiterer
- The Best of Col'n Carpenter

== Awards ==
=== Logie Awards ===
The series won two consecutive Logie Awards (1989–1990) for Most Popular Light Entertainment/Comedy Program, while cast member Mary-Anne Fahey won a Logie Award for Most Popular Light Entertainment/Comedy Personality for her appearance on The Comedy Company in 1989.

=== ARIA Music Awards ===
The Comedy Company won one ARIA Music Award from two nominations.

Year	Nominee / work	Award	Result
1989	The Comedy Company Album	Best Comedy Release	Won
1990	Comedy Company Classics	Best Comedy Release	Nominated

== Spin-offs ==
=== Col'n Carpenter ===
Col'n Carpenter is a 1990–1991 Australian television sitcom spinoff, starring Kim Gyngell, reprising his character from The Comedy Company. It ran for four series, co-starring Stig Wemyss and Vikki Blanche; during the second series, Blanche was replaced by singer Kaarin Fairfax.

=== Con's Bewdiful Holiday Videos ===
Network 10 screened Con's Bewdiful Holiday Videos, a 1997 spin-off starring Mark Mitchell as both Con the Fruiterer and his wife Marika. The show was a combination of a sitcom and of a "funny home video" program, in the same vein as Australia's Funniest Home Videos.

== See also ==
- List of Australian television series
