= Mary-Anne Fahey =

Australian actress, comedian and writer

- Born: Mary-Anne Waterman; 19 August 1955 (age 70); Melbourne, Victoria, Australia
- Occupations: Actress; comedian; screenwriter; author
- Years active: 1981–present
- Spouse(s): Ian McFadyen; Morris Gleitzman (1994 – 2011); Paul Jennings

Mary-Anne Fahey (born 19 August 1955 as Mary-Anne Waterman) credited also as Maryanne Fahey, is an Australian actress, comedian, screenwriter and children's author.

== Career ==
Fahey has starred in and written for numerous TV and film comedy programs including The Comedy Company, Kittson Fahey, the first Australian female-only sketch comedy program, Get a Life and One Size Fits All. She had roles in Future Schlock, The Dunera Boys, All the Rivers Run II, Celia, Lucky Break and SeaChange. She has received roles in theatre including Mary Lives!.

Fahey is most famous for her work on Channel Ten's The Comedy Company especially for her school girl character, Kylie Mole, and three-year-old "Jophesine", the Play School Sketches with Glenn Robbins and the "Bedscene" sketches with her then real-life husband Ian McFadyen.

In the 1980s she appeared in an advertisement for David Reid electronics, which was promoting the Commodore Amiga 500.

=== Kylie Mole ===
Fahey's Kylie Mole character—a scowling schoolgirl—was so popular she published the best-selling novel My Diary by Kylie Mole. She released a Double A-Side single with tracks "So Excellent"/"I Go, I Go", which hit #8 on the Australian ARIA chart in November 1988. A music video for "So Excellent" was filmed. The Kylie Mole character was one of several iconic characters that appeared in the show. Her characterisation especially resonated with Australian youth. The Australian adoption of the word "bogan" was first popularised in the media by Kylie Mole, and other phrases she used gained a wider currency.

== Later career ==
Fahey lives in Melbourne and is concentrating on writing and children's theatre. In May 2007, she published her first children's novel, I, Nigel Dorking: An Autobiography about a Boy with an Unusual Vocabulary, a Suit of Armour and an Unshakeable Dream, Written by That Very Boy (Nigel Dorking), Grade Six (ISBN 0-143-30247-7 and ISBN 978-0-14-330247-6).

== Awards ==
Fahey won a 1989 Logie Award for "Most Popular Light Entertainment/Comedy Personality" for her work on The Comedy Company. She has won an AWGIE Award and an Irish-dancing trophy where she came second in a competition of two.

== Personal life ==
Fahey has two sons. Thomas Fahey, from her first marriage, and James McFadyen, born 12 July 1990. Fahey and Ian McFadyen split up in 1992. From 1994 until 2011 her partner was children's writer Morris Gleitzman. He too has a background in comedy writing as a former writer for The Norman Gunston Show, and a satirical columnist for The Sydney Morning Herald and The Age.

From 2014, Fahey has been in a relationship with Paul Jennings, another children's book writer who had previously collaborated with Morris Gleitzman on two books series, Wicked and Deadly.

== Filmography ==
=== Film ===
Year	Title	Role	Type
1984	Future Schlock	Sarah	Feature film
1989	Celia	Pat Carmichael	Feature film
1994	Lucky Break (aka Paperback Romance)	Myra	Feature film

=== Television ===
Year	Title	Role	Type
1981	Cop Shop	Robyn Cain	2 episodes
1983	Prisoner	Kelly Fraser	2 episodes
1983	All The Rivers Run	Hilda	Miniseries, 3 episodes
1984	The Keepers		1 episode
1984	Special Squad		1 episode
1985	The Eleventh Hour	Various characters	TV series
1985	The Dunera Boys	Naomi Mendellsohn	Miniseries, 2 episodes
1986	The Great Bookie Robbery	Cheryl	Miniseries, 2 episodes
1986	Rubbery Figures	Various characters (voice)	TV series
1987	Willing and Abel		1 episode
1988	The Flying Doctors	Lisa Morgan	1 episode
1988	The Gerry Connolly Show	Various characters	5 episodes
1988–1990	The Comedy Company	Kylie Mole	Regular role
1991	All Together Now	Rivka Carpenter	1 episode
1992–1993	Kittson Fahey	Various characters	
1993–1996	Crocadoo	Gina (voice)	Animated series, season 1
1994	Blue Heelers	Sandra Lynch	1 episode
1997	Get a Life	Jackie Carter (voice)	Animated series
1998	Crocadoo II	Kelly (voice)	Animated series, 1 episode
1999	Chuck Finn	Dr. McCorquondale (voice)	Animated series, 1 episode
2000	SeaChange	Kerry Philby	1 episode
2000	One Size Fits All	Herself / Various characters	13 episodes

== Stage ==
Year	Title	Role	Venue / Company
1980	Alcestis		University of Melbourne
1981	Carnival Knowledge		Melbourne Comedy Cafe
1986	Faking It	Presenter	Living Arts Centre, Adelaide for Adelaide Fringe Festival
1986	Faking It 2	Presenter	The Last Laugh, Melbourne
1987	No Trouble		Universal Theatre, Melbourne
1992	Mary Lives!	Mary	Malthouse Theatre, Geelong Arts Centre, Monash University with Playbox Theatre Company
1992	A Night of Infectious Laughter		Melbourne Athenaeum
1993	Humorists Read the Humorists		Canberra Theatre with Comedy Summit
1993	The Grand Finale Galah		Canberra Theatre with Comedy Summit

=== As writer ===
Year	Title	Role	Venue / Company
1987	Duck	Writer	Le Joke, Melbourne with Handspan Theatre
