= Con the Fruiterer =

Fictional character

- First appearance: The Comedy Company
- Created by: Mark Mitchell
- Portrayed by: Mark Mitchell

In-universe information
- Occupation: Fruit shop owner
- Family: Roula, Toula, Soula, Voula, Foula, Agape (daughters), Nick, Rick (sons)
- Spouse: Marika
- Nationality: Greek

Con Dikaletus aka Con the Fruiterer is a fictional character created by Australian actor and comedian Mark Mitchell.

== Character ==
Mitchell created the character after being served by two Greek Australian stall holders at Glenferrie Markets in 1984. The character became known nationally from regular appearances in The Comedy Company, for which he also created the character of Con's wife, Marika. According to Comedy Company writer Ian McFadyen, "Con the Fruiterer was an attempt to represent that whole immigrant subculture which until recently has been totally ignored except as a stereotype token wog". Con has six daughters, Roula, Toula, Soula, Voula, Foula and Agape. (A running joke is that he approves of his similarly-named daughters, but Agape is ugly, stupid or otherwise the black sheep of the cohort.) He also has two sons, Nick and Rick.

Con's catchphrases "coupla days", "bewdiful" and "doesn't madda" entered the Australian vernacular. In August 1989, then Prime Minister Bob Hawke appeared in a sketch on The Comedy Company the premise of presenting Con with Australian citizenship. In reply to Con's question as to when Hawke was going to fix up the country, Hawke took great delight in responding "a coupla days".

The characters of Con and Marika continue to make appearances on and off television. Con the Fruiterer was appointed Moomba Monarch (popularly called King of Moomba) in 1989, despite opposition from the Greek community. Greek-Australian comedian Nick Giannopoulos would later say, "Mark's a great impersonator, but I'm not a big fan of non-wogs playing wogs. I felt very uncomfortable when Mark was doing those pieces."

Con's Bewdiful Australia: A Guide to the Second-Best Country in the World was published by Penguin Books in 1989. Although written by Mitchell, authorship was credited to 'Con Dikaletis'. A condensed version of the book, read by Mitchell as Con, was released on audio cassette. A spinoff series Con's Bewdiful Holiday Videos was screened on the Ten Network in 1997. Con also fronted a campaign urging Australians to eat more fruit in 2010.

== Discography ==
=== Singles ===
| Year | Title | Peak chart positions | Album |
| Year | Title | AUS | Album |
|---|---|---|---|
| 1988 | "A Cuppla Days" | 48 | The Comedy Company Album |

== Awards and nominations ==
=== ARIA Music Awards ===
The ARIA Music Awards are a set of annual ceremonies presented by Australian Recording Industry Association (ARIA), which recognise excellence, innovation, and achievement across all genres of the music of Australia. They commenced in 1987.

| Year | Nominee / work | Award | Result | Ref. |
|---|---|---|---|---|
| 1989 | "A Cuppla Days" | Best Comedy Release | Nominated | |
