= Kittson Fahey =

Australian television series

Kittson Fahey is an Australian sketch comedy television series that was first screened on the ABC between 1992 and 1993. The series starred Jean Kittson and Mary-Anne Fahey with a supporting cast that included David Swann and Phillip Scott.
