= Ian McFadyen =

Australian actor and director

- Born: 8 July 1948 (age 78); Pascoe Vale, Victoria, Australia
- Occupations: Television actor; director; producer; writer
- Spouses: Jo McFadyen, Mary-Anne Fahey (divorced)

Ian McFadyen (born 8 July 1948) is an Australian television writer, actor, director and producer, is best known for the Australian television comedy series The Comedy Company and Let the Blood Run Free.

== Early life ==
McFadyen used to paint while he was at school and university, until about the age of 22.

== Career ==
McFadyen played the part of Detective Mears in the iconic Australian TV series Prisoner, in 1983. He wrote the 1988 comedy feature film The Bit Part, starring Nicole Kidman, Chris Haywood and Maurie Fields.

After filming an unaired pilot, McFadyen used the remaining funding to produce a series of eight one-hour shows, called The Eleventh Hour, which aired late nights on Channel Seven. A precursor to The Comedy Company, it introduced characters such as Uncle Arthur, who was portrayed by Glenn Robbins.

From 1988, McFadyen created, produced and appeared in multi-award winning Australian satirical sketch series The Comedy Company. The show ran for 80 episodes across three seasons, from 16 February 1988 to 11 November 1990, and starred Mary-Anne Fahey, Glenn Robbins, Mark Mitchell, Russell Gilbert and Kim Gyngell. While short-lived, the series went on to out-rate current affairs show 60 Minutes and launched numerous iconic catchphrases and characters, including Kylie Mole, Con the Fruiterer and Col'n Carpenter. One of McFadyen's most memorable characters on the show was 'David Rabbitborough', a parodic impersonation of British naturalist David Attenborough.

McFadyen next directed, wrote episodes for and performed in spoof soap opera Let the Blood Run Free (based on the hit stage show of the same name), opposite Jean Kittson and Peter Rowsthorn. The series was, in part, a send up of medical soap opera The Young Doctors. From 1992 to 1993, he wrote, produced and directed comedy series Bingles, starring Shane Bourne and Russell Gilbert. He was also a writer on 1992 Crawford Productions sitcom Newlyweds, starring Sandy Gore, Annie Jones and Cathy Godbold. The series ran for four seasons, until 1994.

During this time, McFadyen also hosted the Australian version of 'whodunnit' game show Cluedo, which ran from 1992 to 1995, for 26 episodes. In 1995, he was a writer on Terror, a telemovie episode of The Feds, a series focused on investigations of the Australian Federal Police, starring Robert Taylor and Angie Milliken. That same year, McFadyen began starring in children's series The Genie from Down Under, as Roderick 'Bubbles' Ackrington-Smyth, reprising his role in the second season three years later.

In the mid-1990s, with television sketch shows beginning to fall out of favour and little demand for new shows, McFadyen relocated to Queensland to work on a film and a sitcom.

In 2000, McFadyen wrote animated series Wicked!, based on the children's bestseller by Morris Gleitzman and Paul Jennings. The series ran for 26 episodes. Further writing continued with animated series Mormel Spots in 2003.

In 2006, McFadyen created the Network Ten sketch comedy show The Wedge, which starred Rebel Wilson. He also wrote a 2010 episode of K-9 (a Doctor Who spin-off sci-fi series, focusing on the adventures of the robot dog K9), called "The Bounty Hunter". The same year, he played a vampire in an advertisement for Australian Lotteries.

McFadyen most recently appeared in children's series Rock Island Mysteries from 2022 to 2024, playing the role of Old Faraz.

McFadyen has also authored numerous books, including Mind Wars: The Battle for Your Brain (2000), published by Allen & Unwin. He co-wrote the satirical novel Going Out Backwards (2015) with Ross Fitzgerald, part of the pair's Grafton Everest series, which also includes The Dizzying Heights (2019), The Lowest Depths (2021) and Pandemonium (2023). His most recent collaboration with Fitzgerald is the satirical novel, Chalk and Cheese: A Fabrication (2025).

== Personal life ==
McFadyen was once married to actress, comedian and former collaborator Mary-Anne Fahey, with whom he had a son James McFadyen, born on 12 July 1990. The couple parted ways in 1992.

In the mid-1990s, McFadyen and his wife Jo relocated to Brisbane, where he taught for nearly a decade, before working at Masters Timber and Hardware until his retirement in 2015. At the age of 58, he resumed his hobby of painting, while working on talkback radio, on 4BC.

== Filmography ==
=== Director / writer / producer ===
Year	Title	Role	Type	Ref.
1970	Nothing Like Experience	Production Assistant	Student film	
1980	Alive and Kicking	Director	Documentary short	
1983	Home	Writer	4 episodes	
1984	The Keepers	Writer	1 episode	
1984	The Cleaning	Writer	Short film	
1984	Infinity Limited	Writer	5 episodes	
1985	The Eleventh Hour	Producer / Writer	8 episodes	
1985	Trapp, Winkle and Box	Writer	TV series	
1988	The Bit Part	Writer	Film	
1988	The Comedy Company	Director / Producer / Writer	TV series	
1989	The Great TV Game Show	Executive Producer	16 episodes	
1990	The Big Time	Producer	2 episodes	
1990	Larger than Life	Producer	TV series	
1990–1993	Let the Blood Run Free	Executive Producer	26 episodes	
1992–1993	Bingles	Executive Producer	23 episodes	
1992–1993	Bingles	Writer / Director / Producer		
1993–1994	Newlyweds	Executive Producer	52 episodes	
1993–1994	Newlyweds	Writer / Additional Writer / Creator	36 episodes	
1995	The Feds: Terror	Writer	TV movie	
1998	Shadows of Paradise	Writer	TV movie	
2001	Wicked!	Writer	TV series	
2002	The Comedy Company: So Excellent	Director / Producer	TV movie documentary	
2002	The Vector File	Screenplay / Story	TV movie	
2003	Mormel Spots	Writer	TV series	
2006	The Wedge	Co-Executive Producer / Producer / Writer	26 episodes	
2010	The Verge	Executive Producer	10 episodes	
2010	The Verge	Writer	2 episodes	
2010	The Verge	Special Guest Director		
2010	K-9	Writer	Episode: "The Bounty Hunter"	
2011	WAC! World Animal Championships	Writer	TV series	
2018	In Like Flynn	Stills Photographer	Feature film	

=== Actor / performer ===
Year	Title	Role	Type	Ref.
1982	Snow: The Movie	Ian	TV movie	
1983; 1984	Prisoner	Joe Timmons / Det. Fred Mears	5 episodes	
1983; 1984	Carson's Law	Player 1 / Dorian / Brodie	3 episodes	
1984	...And Where Lies the Justice?		TV movie	
1984	Special Squad	Evans	1 episode	
1985	Glass Babies	Dr. B. Bombar	TV movie	
1985	One Summer Again	Theodore Fink	Miniseries, 3 episodes	
1985	The Eleventh Hour	Various roles	TV series	
1986	Malcolm	Model Shop Salesman	Feature film	
1988	Boulevard of Broken Dreams	Hotel Clerk	Feature film	
1988	A Cry in the Dark (aka Evil Angels)	Attorney General	Feature film	
1988	The Bit Part	Commercial Director	Feature film	
1988	The Comedy Company	David Rabbitborough / Ian	TV series	
1991	All Together Now	Simon Carpenter	1 episode	
1992	Cluedo	Host	23 episodes	
1996	The Genie from Down Under	Lord 'Bubbles' Uppington-Smythe	10 episodes	
1998	The Genie from Down Under 2	Lord 'Bubbles' Uppington-Smythe	12 episodes	
2003	No Man or Woman is an Island	Narrator	Short film	
2004	Flushed	Narrator	Short film	
2005–2010	20 to 1	Himself	5 episodes	
2011	Dartworth	Darren 'The Spider' Twine	Film	
2015	The Lovers	Aide	Film	
2015–2017	Stop Laughing...This Is Serious	Himself	4 episodes	
2019	Bluey	Bob (voice)	1 episode	
2020	The End	Mr Bogdanowicz	3 episodes	
2020	Retcon	Ian	1 episode	
2022	Troppo	Vet	1 episode	
2022–2024	Rock Island Mysteries	Old Faraz	12 episodes	
