= The Last Laugh (comedy venue) =

Australian comedy club

The Laugh Last Theatre Restaurant & Zoo, popularly known as The Last Laugh, was a comedy club in Melbourne, Australia. It was a major centre for the development of Australian alternative comedy, and from 1981 incorporated a smaller venue called Le Joke.

== History and description ==
The 250-seat Last Laugh opened in 1976 at 64 Smith Street, Collingwood in the former Foresters Hall.

A smaller upstairs venue, Le Joke, was added in 1981. Alan Pentland (who later starred in the sketch comedy series Fast Forward) ran this venue for some time.

Acts associated with The Last Laugh in the 1980s included Los Trios Ringbarkus, The Phones, Rod Quantock, Mary Keneally, Wendy Harmer, Jane Clifton, Circus Oz, Tracey Harvey, Glenn Robbins, and Richard Stubbs.
