= Mark Mitchell (actor) =

Australian actor and comedian

- Born: 29 September 1954 (age 72); Melbourne, Victoria, Australia
- Occupations: Actor, comedian, contemporary artist
- Years active: 1984–present

Mark Mitchell (born 29 September 1954) is an Australian actor, comedian and contemporary artist, best known for his roles in the sketch comedy series The Comedy Company, most especially his character of Greek Australian greengrocer Con the Fruiterer, as well as his role in Round the Twist as greedy real estate agent Mr. Gribble.

== Early life and education ==
Mark Mitchell was born in Melbourne, Victoria.

He studied at the University of Melbourne in English and graduated with a Bachelor of Arts (BA) and then attended Rusden College (now part of Deakin University). completing a Diploma of Education.

== Career ==
Prior to his showbiz and acting career, Mitchell taught English at a secondary school for five years before becoming an advertising copy-writer.

He started in entertainment by starring in the pioneering sketch comedy show The Eleventh Hour, a predecessor to hit sketch show The Comedy Company.

He portrayed numerous characters on the show, but was best known for his comic character of bumbling greengrocer 'Con the Fruiterer'. Mitchell stated he created Con after being served by two Greek Australian stall holders at the Glenferrie Markets in 1984. The character became known nationally from regular appearances in The Comedy Company, for which he also created the character of Con's wife, Marika.

Mitchell has made many guest appearances on Australian television series such as SeaChange, Neighbours, Something in the Air, Blue Heelers, Prisoner, Special Squad, Willing and Abel, Dogwoman and Upper Middle Bogan.

He also starred in children's television programs Round the Twist as greedy real estate agent Mr. Gribble as well as Lift Off and The Genie From Down Under.

He played the part of Chief Quimby in the 2003 film Inspector Gadget 2. He has also lent his voice to the children's animated series Li'l Elvis Jones and the Truckstoppers and The Flamin' Thongs.

Mitchell voices commercial radio advertising campaigns, playing a dim-witted fool who interviews various people about radio advertising, with amusing consequences resulting from his character's lack of understanding the interviewees.

He portrayed fictional museum exhibit figure 'Max Muck' for some of the video reel and photos used and depicted in the exhibit "The Muck Bunker Constipation Experience" at Scienceworks Museum in Melbourne, housed in the Spotswood Pumping Station.

He has had supporting lead roles in various US movies made in Australia including The Munsters' Scary Little Christmas and The Strange Story of Sante and Kenny Kimes, and voiced the character of 'Buck Cluck' for the Australian release of Chicken Little. He has also portrayed David Lange in the 1994 New Zealand miniseries Fallout.

== Filmography ==
=== Film ===
Year	Title	Role	Type
1985	Wills & Burke	Carpenter	Feature film
1987	Ground Zero	Detective	Feature film
1987	With Love to the Person Next to Me	Salesman in Taxi	Feature film
1988	Evil Angels (aka A Cry in the Dark)	School Teacher	Feature film
2003	Inspector Gadget 2	Chief Frank Quimby	Feature film
2005	Chicken Little	Buck Cluck (voice – Australian release only)	Feature film
2009	The Fourth Pillar	Dr. Francis Staedler	Feature film
2011	Taj	Ben	Feature film
2016	Spirit of the Game	President Bingham	Feature film
2024	Carole & Grey	Narrator	

=== Television ===
Year	Title	Role	Type
1984	Carson's Law	Worker at protest	TV series, 1 episode
1985	The Fast Lane	Derek	TV series, 1 episode
1985	Trapp, Winkle and Box	Various characters	TV series
1985	A Thousand Skies	Hotel Receptionist in San Francisco	TV miniseries, 1 episode
1985	Anzacs	Young Dying German	TV miniseries, 1 episode
1985	The Eleventh Hour	Various characters (including Bert Newton)	TV series
1984–1986	Prisoner	Peter Waterson / Steve Formby / Restaurateur	TV series, 4 episodes
1986	Sword of Honour	Sergeant Olsen	TV miniseries, 4 episodes
1987	The Petrov Affair	West	TV miniseries, 2 episodes
1987	Willing and Abel	Sergeant Dobson	TV series, 9 episodes
1988	The Comedy Company	Con the Fruiterer / Stuart Parkington-Loafe / Marika Dikaletis (Con's Wife)	TV series
1990	Larger than Life	Various characters	TV series
1990	The Big Time	Mark	TV series, 2 episodes
1992	Good Vibrations	W.C. Fields	TV miniseries, 1 episode
1992	Lift Off	Mr. Fish	TV series, 2 episodes
1992	E Street	Uncle Wally	TV series, 2 episodes
1992; 2000–2001	Round the Twist	Mr. Gribble	TV series, 39 episodes
1993	Paradise Beach	Shirley Barnett	TV series
1994	TVTV	Co-host	TV series
1995	Fallout	David Lange	TV miniseries, 2 episodes
1996	The Genie from Down Under	Otto von Meister	TV series, 12 episodes
1996	The Munsters' Scary Little Christmas	Santa Claus	TV movie
1997	Con's Bewdiful Holiday Videos	Con the Fruiterer / Marika	TV series
1998	The Genie From Down Under 2	Otto von Meister / Mrs Simpson	TV series, 13 episodes
1998	Li'l Elvis and the Truckstoppers	Voice	Animated TV series
2000	Something in the Air	Neville McGregor	TV series, 5 episodes
2000	SeaChange	Morton Tregonning	TV series, 7 episodes
2000	Dogwoman: Dead Dog Walking	Prologue Narrator (voice)	TV movie
2000	On the Beach	Reg	TV movie
2000	Dogwoman: A Grrrl's Best Friend	Prologue Narrator (voice)	TV movie
2001	Like Mother Like Son: The Strange Story of Sante and Kenny Kimes	Sante's Lawyer	TV movie
2001	Dogwoman: The Legend of Dogwoman	Prologue Narrator (voice)	TV movie
2001	The Wonderful World of Disney	Griff	TV movie, episode: "Child Star: The Shirley Temple Story"
2001	Blonde	Texas Oilman	TV miniseries, 2 episodes
2001	Backlands	Chief Inspector Peck	TV movie
2001	Farscape	Mu-Quillus	TV series, 1 episodes
2004	Blue Heelers	Arnold Robinson	TV series, 1 episode
2004	Loot	Billy Angel	TV movie
2005	Eagle and Evans	Ron Salisbury	TV series, 1 episode
2006	Nightmares & Dreamscapes: From the Stories of Stephen King	Blondie	TV miniseries, 1 episode
2007	The Nation	Con the Fruiterer	TV series, 1 episode
2009	Paper Planes	Mr. White	TV movie
2010	Neighbours	Magistrate Paul O'Regan	TV series, 3 episodes
2010	Sleuth 101	Ramsay McGordon	TV series, 1 episode
2013	This Week Live	Con the Fruiterer	TV series
2014	The Flamin' Thongs	Trevor Thong (voice)	Animated TV series, 26 episodes
2014	Upper Middle Bogan	Dr. Mortimer	TV series, 1 episode
2016	Movement	Casting Agent Dave	TV series, 1 episode
2016	The Wizards of Aus	Senator Quinn	TV series, 4 episodes
2016	Jack Irish	Radio Host	TV series, 1 episode
2016	The Doctor Blake Mysteries	Harvey Treloar	TV series, 1 episode
2018	True Story with Hamish & Andy	Dr. Beatson	TV series, 1 episode
2018	American Eggs	Driver	TV series, 2 episodes
2016–2019	Feedback	Narrator / Charles Bukowski	TV series, 2 episodes
2021	New Gold Mountain	Linus Cummins	TV miniseries, 3 episodes
2025	The Newsreader	Brian's Dad	TV series, 1 episode
2025	Superwog (TV series)|	Car Dealer George	

=== Video ===
Year	Title	Role	Type
	The Muck Bunker Constipation Experience	Max Muck	Video reel (for Scienceworks (Melbourne)
1989	Con the Fruiterer: A Coupla Days	Con the Fruiterer	Music video
1992	The Story of EC	Mr. Fish	Video
2010	Finding My Magic	Mench / Tom (voice)	Video
