= Richard Stubbs =

Australian comedian

- Born: Brighton, Victoria, Australia
- Occupations: Radio presenter, writer, comedian
- Years active: 1983−present

Richard Stubbs is an Australian radio and television presenter, writer and comedian.

== Early life and education ==
Richard Stubbs was born in Brighton, Victoria.

He was educated at Wesley College, Melbourne, where he was school captain. He then completed a Bachelor of Economics degree.

== Career ==
After a try-out routine at Melbourne's Last Laugh comedy theatre in 1983, Stubbs' style of anecdotal comedy, based on real-life experience, proved successful. His ability to hold an audience with his sharp delivery and rapid-fire ad libs earned him a reputation as the hottest arrival on the comedy scene. Since then, Stubbs has performed in many Australian and international comedy venues, including Montreal, Los Angeles, London and New York.

Stubbs' TV credits include that of writer, interviewer, co-host, host, actor and comedian. His live performances were refined by the experience of hosting 121 Tonight Live shows on Friday evenings on the Seven Network nationally from 1990 to 1993.

Public interest in Stubbs became evident when he retired from radio at the end of 1997. In 1998 and 1999 he had numerous corporate engagements and regularly appeared on and hosted Hey Hey It's Saturday. He completed a sell-out season at the Athenaeum Theatre during the Melbourne International Comedy Festival in April 1998 and had two national tours in the same year.

Stubbs' first published book was 1998's Still Life – Thoughts of a Man Hurriedly Going Nowhere.

In 2003, he performed his Melbourne International Comedy Festival show, Richard Stubbs Comperes Le Joke. He then continued the festival run by selling out his Up Close show at the Gold Coast Comedy Festival and a season at Sydney's Comedy Store, together with varied corporate engagements around the country in 2003 and 2004.

In 2016, he returned to stand-up comedy performing in venues around Australia. In 2017 he performed his one-man show, Richard Stubbs In Full Flight, at the Melbourne International Comedy Festival.

== Radio ==
=== 3XY / Triple M ===
Stubbs' radio background is extensive, with 20 years of experience as a presenter. He started on 3XY's XY-Zoo breakfast show, followed by Triple M in the mornings before moving to the Richard Stubbs Breakfast Show for five years.

=== TTFM ===
Stubbs returned to radio from 2000 to 2003 on 101.1 TTFM (now known as KIIS 101.1), hosting two years in the morning shift and the third year in the 6:00–9:00 am breakfast shift.

=== 774 ABC Melbourne ===
In 2006, Stubbs joined 774 ABC Melbourne as the Afternoons presenter. In October 2015, he resigned after 11 years at the station. Stubbs had been the subject of formal complaints of workplace bullying in his final months.

=== 3AW ===
In October 2016, Stubbs joined 3AW's Weekend Break as a regular contributor alongside brother Peter ("Grubby") and Diane ("Dee Dee") Dunleavy.

== Personal life ==
Stubbs' brother is Melbourne radio personality Peter Stubbs.

Stubbs has two children and partner Kim Scowcroft, a former queen of Melbourne's Moomba Festival. He resides in Brighton, Victoria.
