= Michael Petroni =

Australian screenwriter and film director

Michael Petroni is an Australian screenwriter and director.

== Biography ==
Petroni worked in the early 1990s as a comedy writer and performer on Australian television, and appeared as "Psycho Bob", an American serial killer character, in The Big Gig and DAAS Kapital (with the Doug Anthony All Stars).

In 1994, he moved to Los Angeles to study screenwriting at the AFI Conservatory, from which he graduated in 1996. During his time at the AFI, he wrote his first feature film script, Till Human Voices Wake Us which he subsequently directed as a feature film starring Guy Pearce and Helena Bonham Carter, winning several awards for the script.

Since his debut, Petroni has also co-written The Dangerous Lives of Altar Boys (2002), Queen of the Damned (2002) and Possession (2009), an English language adaptation of the Korean film Addicted. He also co-created the 2003 TV series Miracles with Richard Hatem, with the series based on his unfilmed movie script A Course in Miracles which had been in development since 1998 with Jerry Zucker and later Russell Crowe attached to direct.

On 26 February 2008, Variety reported that Petroni was writing the script for The Chronicles of Narnia: The Voyage of the Dawn Treader, the third installment in The Chronicles of Narnia franchise. He wrote the screenplay for exorcism horror movie The Rite based on the book The Rite: The Making of a Modern Exorcist by Matt Baglio. In March 2013, Screen Australia announced that it would be funding an Australian supernatural thriller, Backtrack, which Petroni would write and direct.

In November 2017, it was announced that Petroni would be credited as an executive producer and creator for the Netflix thriller series, Messiah. The series premiered on 1 January 2020.

== Filmography ==
=== Film writing credits ===
- Till Human Voices Wake Us (2002)
- The Dangerous Lives of Altar Boys (2002)
- Queen of the Damned (2002)
- Possession (2009)
- The Chronicles of Narnia: The Voyage of the Dawn Treader (2010)
- The Rite (2011)
- The Book Thief (2013)
- Backtrack (2015)
- The Pope's Exorcist (2023)

=== Television credits ===
- Miracles (2003; co-creator)
- Masters of Science Fiction (2007; episode "The Awakening"; teleplay)
- Messiah (2019; creator)

=== Directing credits ===
- Trespasses (1999 short film)
- Till Human Voices Wake Us (2002)
- Masters of Science Fiction (2007; episode "The Awakening")
- Backtrack (2015)

=== Acting credits ===
- DAAS Kapital (1991–1992; as "Psycho Bob")
- Masters of Horror (2006; episode "Pick Me Up" as Ambulance Attendant)
