= Paul McDermott =

Australian comedian, singer and television presenter

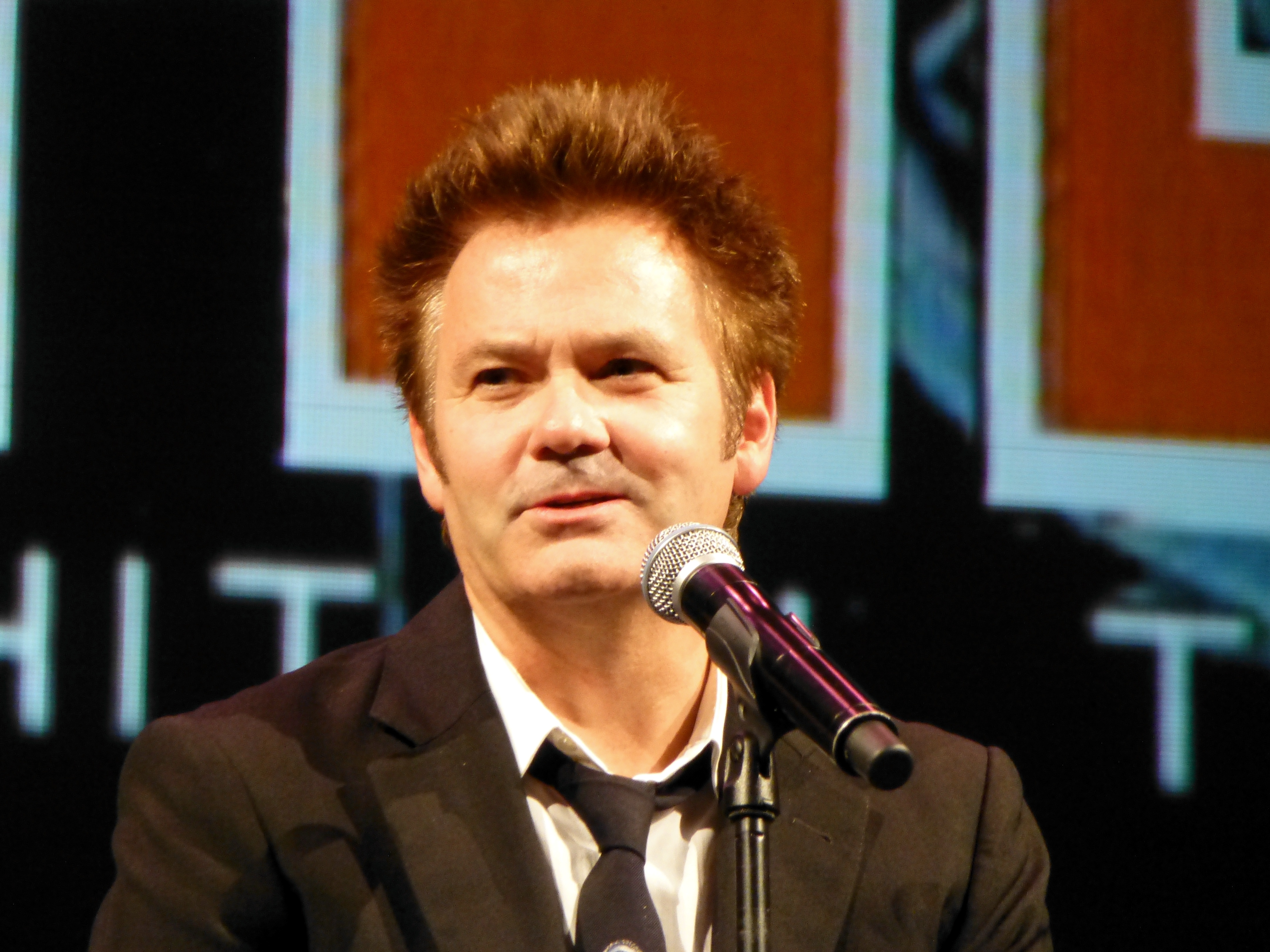
- McDermott at the DAAS Kapital DVD launch, April 2013
- Born: Paul Anthony Michael McDermott; 13 May 1962 (age 64); Adelaide, South Australia, Australia
- Notable work: Doug Anthony All Stars, Good News Week
- Partner: Melissa Lyne
- Children: 1

Comedy career
- Years active: 1985–present
- Medium: Stand-up, television, radio, books
- Genres: Musical comedy, news satire
- Subjects: Drama, art

Paul Anthony Michael McDermott (born 13 May 1962) is an Australian entertainer, best known both for Good News Week and for his role as a member of the musical comedy group the Doug Anthony All Stars. He has frequently appeared at the Melbourne International Comedy Festival and taken part in its two major televised productions, the Comedy Festival Gala and the Great Debate. McDermott has also performed and written numerous shows as a solo performer and authored children’s books and newspaper articles and directed short animated films.

== Personal life ==
McDermott was born in Adelaide, South Australia, a fraternal twin and one of six children in a Catholic family. His father, John, was a senior public servant and his mother, Betty, a home manager. The family moved to Canberra when McDermott was three. He attended Marist College Canberra, where he describes himself as having been painfully shy and a "bit of a loner"; Dickson College; and the Canberra School of Art at the Australian National University, where he studied art for four years. He describes painting as his first love, and still considers his final year piece at art school to be his finest work. Indeed, he only started performing at the age of 25 because he needed money to buy canvases. "It was either that or waiting on tables and I thought I'd soon get pissed off with people doing that," he says. Privately, McDermott maintains his interest in art through painting, drawing and hand-crafting books. He works under the alias of artist 'Young Master Paul'.

He has criticised the war on drugs and society's tendency to ignore the large drug subculture that involves people of all ages. "It's out there and it happens, but there's still a fear of talking about it," he says. "In cities like Manchester, with unemployment problems, there are no-alcohol venues where five thousand people under the age of sixteen are eccy'd off their heads every Saturday night."

He has one son with his partner Melissa Lyne. He is also the first cousin of retired Adelaide Crows AFL footballer and current Adelaide media personality Chris McDermott.

== Career ==
=== Doug Anthony All Stars ===
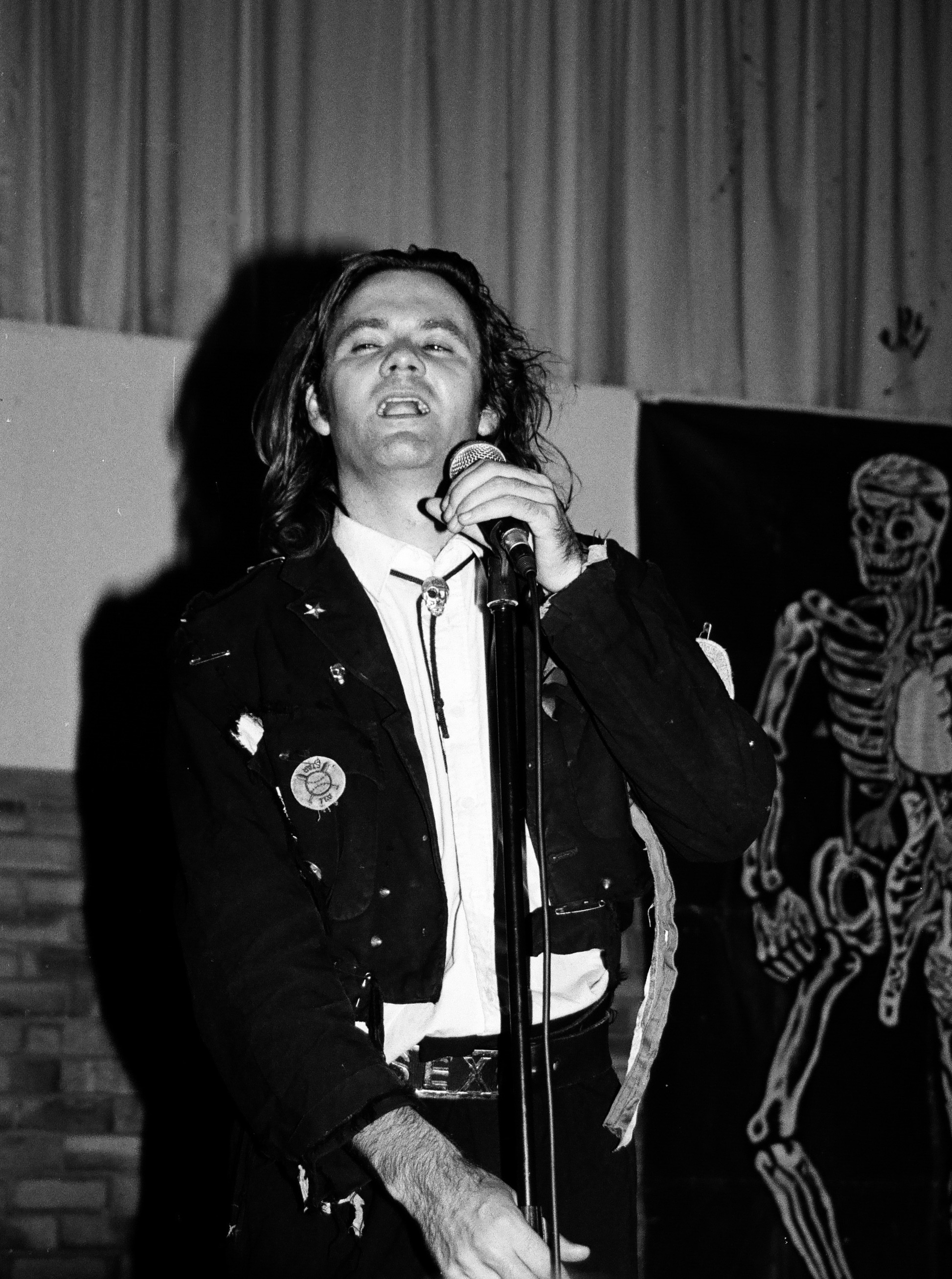
McDermott performing with the Doug Anthony All Stars in 1994.

The Doug Anthony All Stars were a singing comedy trio (comprising McDermott, Tim Ferguson and Richard Fidler) who began busking in Canberra in the 1980s and later gained notoriety at the Edinburgh Fringe Festival. This led to regular appearances on ABC TV’s The Big Gig, where they gained a strong following. Their innovative, brash style broke down many taboos of the time, and many Australian comedians have described DAAS as being their inspiration for wanting to become comedians. McDermott took lead vocals on most songs and wrote much of the material. The group also starred in their own spin off TV show called DAAS Kapital. They broke up in 1995 but later reformed with new guitarist Paul Livingston (replacing Fidler) in 2014 for a series of live shows.

McDermott began busking in 1985, which he says equipped him with useful experience and the ability to cope with most situations when he later started performing in clubs. He joined a group called Gigantic Fly which performed at a new Canberra club called Cafe Boom Boom. It was here that he got to know Tim Ferguson and Richard Fidler of the musical comedy group the Doug Anthony All Stars (DAAS). McDermott was asked to join the group when the third member, Robert Piper, left due to other commitments. His primary reason for joining, he says, was monetary: "I'd been stealing canvas from the bins around the art school." Initially busking and performing live in clubs, with McDermott writing the majority of their material and songs, DAAS achieved success at the 1986 Adelaide Fringe Festival and subsequently travelled to Britain for the Edinburgh Fringe festival, where they were nominated for the Perrier Award. They toured both nationally and internationally, appearing on British television and playing at the opening of the Barcelona Olympics. After initially struggling to gain success in Australia, in 1989 DAAS was picked up to perform on the ABC show The Big Gig, on which they became a popular feature. They appeared frequently on the show until 1991, when the group premiered their own series on the ABC, DAAS Kapital, which ran for two seasons. McDermott says that he liked performing with DAAS because it allowed him to bring together a range of his interests—he got to write, perform, sing, create costumes and paint backdrops.

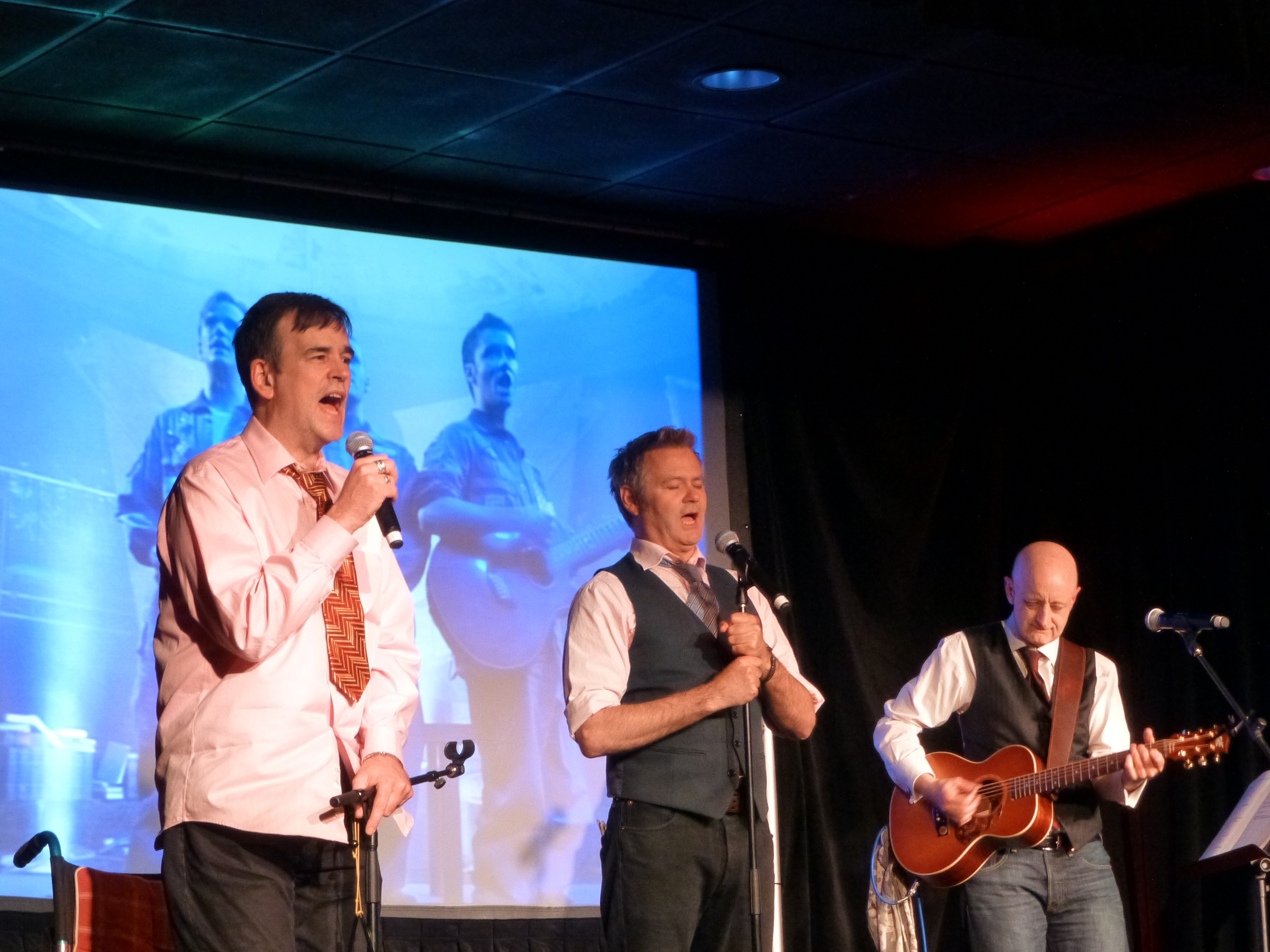
McDermott (centre) performing with Tim Ferguson and Paul Livingston in 2014.

The group split up in 1995 after a final farewell tour of Australia. Rumours of a falling out among the trio persisted for many years, but all three maintained that they had parted on good terms and that it had simply been time to move on, as they had wanted to pursue careers in different directions. Ferguson has since revealed that the break-up was in large part due to his being diagnosed with multiple sclerosis in 1995. In the two years following the break-up of DAAS, McDermott wrote two film scripts and the stage show MOSH!. He says that he was not particularly interested in returning to comedy, which he came to regard as an "aberration, something that had been good to do for eight years but now it was over," until in 1996 he was recruited as host of the satirical news-based quiz show Good News Week.

In 2014, McDermott and Tim Ferguson reunited to tour Australia as the Doug Anthony All Stars, with frequent collaborator Paul Livingston (also known as "Flacco") replacing Richard Fidler as guitarist due to Fidler's radio commitments.

=== Television career ===
In 1996, McDermott was given the role of hosting the ABC's new topical comedy game show Good News Week. The show was notable for being one of the first in Australia to feature an introductory comedic monologue about the week's events, delivered by McDermott. McDermott's monologues also broke new ground in Australian TV for their direct and harsh criticisms of prominent figures, especially politicians. The ABC received a large number of complaints about McDermott for making light of tragic events, use of profanity and drug references, but his willingness to push boundaries was also the reason for his popularity. McDermott would then introduce the two teams of comedians, artists and politicians including team captains Mikey Robbins and Julie McCrossin. This was one of the earliest panel comedy shows on Australian TV and was notable for ensuring gender balance as early as the mid 1990s.

In 1998, McDermott hosted a spin-off called Good News Weekend, which followed a similar format, but with questions based around pop culture. Most episodes finished with McDermott singing a non-comedic song with house band the Gadflys. Many of these songs were cover versions, but his original song "Shut Up and Kiss Me" was released as a single and charted in the JJJ Hottest 100. In 1999, both programs moved to Channel Ten, which renamed Good News Weekend as Good News Week Nite Lite. During this time, McDermott's popularity led to him being given roles as the host of significant Australian award shows including the ARIAs and the AFI Awards. Good News Week was terminated in 2000.

In 2004, McDermott hosted the ABCTV dancing competition Strictly Dancing, which was notable for featuring same-sex dancing partners.

In 2007, McDermott hosted ABC variety program The Sideshow. Each episode began with a monologue similar in style to McDermott's Good News Week monologues. The show was notable for introducing Australian TV audiences to a broad range of cabaret and circus acts while also featuring popular comedians and musicians. Most episodes finished with McDermott singing an original non-comedic song.

In 2008, Channel Ten relaunched Good News Week with McDermott as host. McDermott was nominated for the 2010 Gold Logie award for his hosting role.

In 2015, McDermott hosted SBS interview program Room 101. In 2018, he hosted ABC game show Think Tank.

==== Good News Week ====
In 1996, McDermott was recruited by director Ted Robinson, with whom he had previously worked on The Big Gig, to host Good News Week, which aired on the ABC from 1996 to 1998, and on Network Ten from 1999 to 2000 and then returned in 2008 for a new series. McDermott hosted Good News Week from 1996 until its cancellation in 2000, as well as its two spinoffs, Good News Weekend (1998) and GNW Night Lite (1999), and reprised this role when the series returned in 2008. A comedic quiz show with a similar format to that of the British program Have I Got News for You, it features two teams, with two permanent captains and four guests, competing to answer questions based on recent news events. McDermott opens each show with a humorous monologue based on the news on the week and is responsible for posing questions and awarding points to teams. "I'm sort of judge, jury and executioner," he says of his role. The show premiered on the ABC, but moved to Network Ten in 1999.

The ABC was initially apprehensive about Robinson's choice of McDermott as host. He had dreadlocks at the time, and was best known for the crude, aggressive "bad boy" character he had played in the Doug Anthony All Stars, which many tended to confuse with his actual personality. In addition, it was doubted that he was capable of ad libbing and speaking well, as in past interviews he had usually allowed his fellow band members to do most of the talking. McDermott cut off his dreadlocks for the show and succeeded in broadening his appeal by showing a gentler, more charming side as host. He has said that although he feels there are still elements of his more aggressive character in Good News Week, they are "toned down... I've got to be the generous host now, spin-the-wheel sort of thing. I'm basing myself on Mike Brady now. I'm the disciplinarian."

He would regularly sing on the program, particularly on Good News Weekend and GNW Night Lite, including some of his own original songs. In one episode, McDermott performed the self-penned "Shut Up and Kiss Me" as a duet with Fiona Horne. It was met with such a warm reception from viewers that it was eventually released as a single. Some of his other musical performances from the series are featured on the CD Good News Week Tapes Volume 2, and a collection of his monologues from the start of the show appear on Good News Week Tapes Volume 1.

McDermott expressed his relief when the show was cancelled in 2000, saying that he could not have maintained the relentless production schedule for much longer. "I'm just so tired, I don't feel I have been human for five years," he said. Network Ten had initially intended only to bring back Good News Week as a one-off special, but decided to expand it after the short supply of US shows resulting from the 2007–2008 Writers Guild of America strike caused the network to take an interest in developing more local programs. The revived series premiered on 11 February 2008 with McDermott reprising his role as host.

In 2010, McDermott was nominated for a Gold Logie Award for Most Popular Personality on Australian Television.

==== Other TV work ====
He hosted the AFI awards in 2002, and in 2004 and 2005 presented the ABC show Strictly Dancing. McDermott reunited with Robinson in 2007 when he was named host of a new ABC variety program, The Sideshow, a show described as a successor to The Big Gig. It premiered on 21 April 2007, and quickly built a strong cult audience. However, due in part to poor programming, the show did not rate well and was cancelled after its initial run of 26 episodes. McDermott says he was saddened by The Sideshow's cancellation as he believed it was an excellent venue for performers of alternative work which would have achieved ratings success if it had been allowed to continue.

McDermott returned to regular television hosting in July 2015 as the host of Room 101, an Australian version of the long running British TV show of the same name, airing on SBS One. In 2018, McDermott returned to the ABC as presenter of quiz show Think Tank.

=== Live comedy ===
At the end of the Doug Anthony All Stars, McDermott briefly wrote and performed a show called MOSH, which featured a cappella songs with many lyrics about drug use and won best show at the Adelaide Fringe Festival.

Following the end of Good News Week in 2000, McDermott returned to live comedy and music with a trio called GUD, which toured major Australian cities. The group featured Mick Moriarty, who McDermott had collaborated with on Good News Week, and Cameron Bruce, who he later collaborated with on the Sideshow. Their songs were mostly about topical issues and allowed McDermott to push boundaries further than he had been able to on TV by extensive use of profanity and mockery of tragic events.

Following the end of the relaunched Good News Week in 2011, McDermott toured Australia in shows called Paul Sings, which featured non-comedic songs from his previous TV appearances and humorous stories about McDermott's time in the entertainment industry.

In 2013, he wrote and performed a show called The Dark Garden. The show featured non-comedic songs with increasingly dark lyrics dealing with mortality, following the death of several of his friends. The songs were interspersed with comedic material in which McDermott spoke about his experiences in the entertainment industry, reflections on global politics and banter with the audience.

In 2014, McDermott reunited with Tim Ferguson for a relaunched Doug Anthony All Stars, with new guitarist Paul Livingston. The group performed a combination of old material and new comedic material about their experiences of ageing, including the impacts of Ferguson's multiple sclerosis.

In 2019, McDermott teamed up with Steven Gates from music comedy trio Tripod for a series of live shows called Paul McDermott and Gatesy Live. They released an independent EP called the Bloody Lovelies. Their songs were a mix of comedic songs and non-comedic songs, once again interspersed with comedic material.

In 2021, McDermott teamed up with guitarist Glenn Moorhouse for a series of shows called Paul McDermott Plus One. The pair initially began performing online during Covid lockdowns, but later performed live. They released an EP called I've Seen the Future and You're Not In It.

McDermott describes his performance style as "in your face and unapologetic, grotesque, offensive, loud. But it's all essentially me with the amp turned up—I don't own that many great acting skills." He has stated that he does not consider any subject out of bounds in terms of comedy, which is "one of [his] problems". "I honestly believe you can make a joke about anything if you have something to say," he says. "It really depends on the motivation... The moral objective, I suppose." He is interested in topical humour and targets issues about which he feels passionately, including the detainment of David Hicks, the AWB scandal, torture and the war on terror.

In 1995 he wrote, directed and performed in a stage show entitled MOSH!, which he says is based on "my drug-addled observations when I've been abusing substances". MOSH! received a range of responses; it won the award for best fringe show at the Adelaide festival and was described by one reviewer as "often hilarious", but was savaged by other critics as being "gratuitously offensive". Columbia Artists expressed interest in the show, but after nearly a decade of international travel with the Doug Anthony All Stars, McDermott did not wish to go to New York to do an off-Broadway show.

He reappeared in the Melbourne International Comedy Festival from 2002 with Cameron Bruce and Mick Moriarty in a music-based comedy trio called GUD. The group uses topical humour in its music; their act includes songs about Osama bin Laden, the transportation of live animal stock and what they describe as contemporary Australian "folk heroes" such as Chopper Read, Rene Rivkin and convicted serial killer Ivan Milat. McDermott says that GUD is in a similar vein to the Doug Anthony All Stars in that it revolves around music, comedy and the inter-relationships between the band members onstage. According to McDermott, the group is named GUD in mockery of the way American people pronounce the word "God", "because that's who Americans thank at awards ceremonies, and I thought someone should be taking the credit." Their 2003 show, "Gud Ugh", won The Age Critic's Choice Award for best Australian show of the festival.

In 2002, he also performed a solo stand-up show entitled Comedyoscopy, a deconstruction of comedy, comedic techniques and what makes people laugh. He has frequently participated in the televised Comedy Festival Gala, appearing in 2008 as its host, and has often captained one of the two competing teams in the festival's Great Debate since his first debate appearance in 1994.

=== Other projects ===
McDermott has written as a columnist for The Sydney Morning Herald, The Sun-Herald, The Weekend Australian and The Age. In late 2000, a selection of his columns were published in his first solo book, The Forgetting of Wisdom. Prior to this, he had coauthored books with the Doug Anthony All Stars (Book, DAAS Kapital and Trip) and the writers of Good News Week (Good News Week Books One and Two).

He has also written and illustrated three children's books, two of which (being The Scree and The Girl Who Swallowed Bees) have been adapted into short films with McDermott scripting, directing, performing and painting all of the animations. McDermott describes the stories as "little Gothic, dark, morality tales" which draw on the dark children's tales he consumed during his own childhood, such as the Brothers Grimm's fairy tales. The 2004 film adaptation of The Scree won Best Film at the 2005 Flickerfest International Film Festival and was nominated for an AFI Award for Best Short Fiction Film, while The Girl Who Swallowed Bees (2007) won the AFI Award for Best Short Animation. McDermott says he enjoys filmmaking because it brings together all of his skills. He reportedly has plans to work on a third short film, entitled Crab Boy and the Girl in the Shell, and has expressed an interest in moving into feature films. He also voiced characters in the 2009 short film Tegan the Vegan.

McDermott has also had roles in Australian film, musical theatre and radio. In 2002, he appeared in the Australian theatre production of The Witches of Eastwick in the role of Darryl Van Horne. Despite having sworn he would never do a musical, McDermott says he was interested in the show because "it was still forming, still shaping. It's more challenging than doing a musical that's already in place." He has also had small acting roles in several Australian films, including that of the band manager in The Night We Called It a Day and Trevor in the TV miniseries Through My Eyes: The Lindy Chamberlain Story. In 2020, it was reported that he would play the leading role in an upcoming miniseries, The Home Team, opposite actress, Tara Morice. Between 1996 and 1997 he co-hosted the breakfast radio program on Triple J with Mikey Robins, Steve Abbott and later Jen Oldershaw.

Since the end of Good News Week, McDermott has toured in a series of concerts called "Paul Sings", in which he performed a number of serious songs, most of which were previously aired on Good News Week or The Sideshow.

He was appointed Fringe Ambassador for the Adelaide Fringe in 2013.

Throughout 2018 to 2020, McDermott turned many of his paintings into a short children's picture book, "Ghostbear". The book published in late 2020, through Omnibus Books (an imprint of Scholastic) to critical and commercial success.

== Works ==
=== Discography ===
==== Albums ====
Name	Album details
Unplugged – The Good News Week Tapes Volume 1	Released: 1998; Label: ABC Music (4938282)
Live Songs – The Good News Week Tapes Volume 2	Released: 2000; Label: Virgin (724352549320)

==== Extended plays ====
Name	EP details
I've Seen the Future, and You're Not in It.	Released: 1 October 2021; Label: Paul McDermott

==== Singles ====
List of singles, with Australian chart positions
Title	Year	Peak chart positions
Title	Year	AUS
"Shut Up / Kiss Me" (with Fiona Horne)	1998	48

==== See also ====
- DAAS Icon (1990)
- Dead & Alive (1993)
- The Last Concert (1995)

=== Filmography ===
- Live at the National Theatre (1990)
- The Edinburgh Years (1990)
- DAAS Kapital (1991–1992)
- Dead & Alive (1993)
- Good News Week (1996–2000, 2008–2012)
- Good News Week: Unseen and Obscene (1998)
- The Night We Called it a Day (2003)
- Medusa: First Date (2004)
- The Scree (2004)
- Through My Eyes: The Lindy Chamberlain Story (2004)
- The Girl Who Swallowed Bees (2007)
- The Unlimited Uncollectible Sterling Deluxe Edition (2008)
- Tegan the Vegan (2011)
- Wentworth (2013)
- Della Mortika: Steampunk Adventures (2015)
- Think Tank (2018)

=== Bibliography ===
- BOOK (1989)
- Good News Week Book One (1997)
- Good News Week Book Two (1998)
- The Forgetting of Wisdom (2000)
- The Scree (2001)
- The Girl Who Swallowed Bees (2002)
- Fragments of the Hole (2015)
- Ghostbear (2020)

== Awards and nominations ==
=== ARIA Music Awards ===
The ARIA Music Awards are a set of annual ceremonies presented by Australian Recording Industry Association (ARIA), which recognise excellence, innovation, and achievement across all genres of the music of Australia. They commenced in 1987.

Year	Nominee / work	Award	Result	Ref.
1998	Unplugged Good News Week Tapes Volume 1	Best Comedy Release	Won	

=== Helpmann Awards ===
The Helpmann Awards is an awards show, celebrating live entertainment and performing arts in Australia, presented by industry group Live Performance Australia since 2001. Note: 2020 and 2021 were cancelled due to the COVID-19 pandemic.

Year	Nominee / work	Award	Result	Ref.
2003	Paul McDermott - The Witches of Eastwick	Best Male Actor in a Musical	Nominated	
