= Khym Lam =

Australian actress

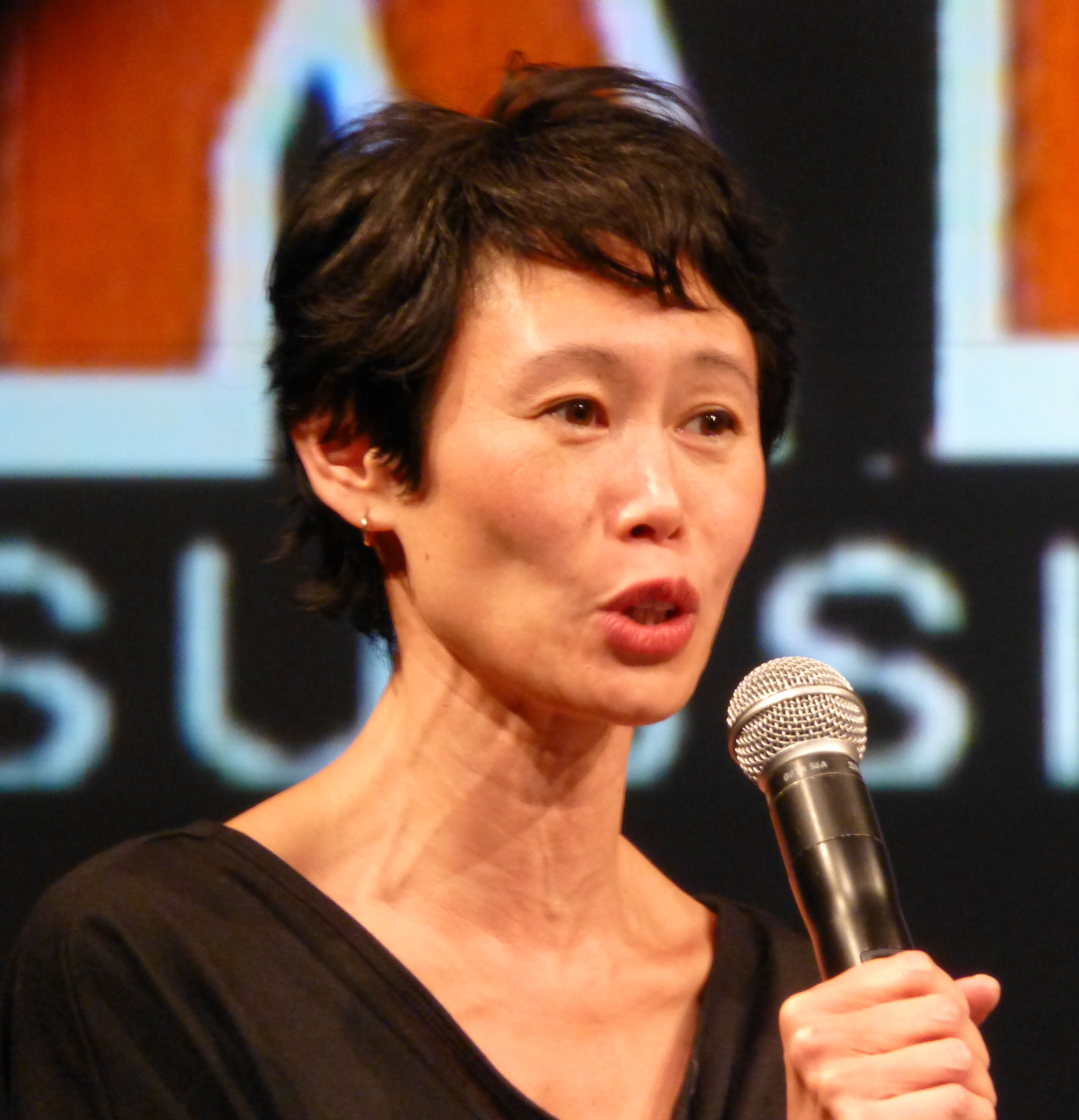
- Born: 1963 or 1964 (age 62–63); Singapore
- Occupation: Actress
- Spouse: Richard Fidler (m. 1993)
- Children: 2

Khym Lam (born 1963 or 1964) is a Singaporean-born Australian actress.

== Early life ==
Lam was born in Singapore to a Malayan father and a Eurasian mother—her grandparents were Charles Davis, a Welsh engineer who married May Lawrence, a part-Chinese woman, before World War II. Lam and her family moved to Australia when she was aged seven. She studied film-making in Melbourne, while waitressing and taking acting roles to support her studies.

== Career ==
In 1987, Lam appeared in The Henderson Kids II as Vietnamese schoolgirl Anh Nguyen, a love interest for main character Steve Henderson.

Lam's breakthrough role came in 1988 when she was cast as the female lead role of Julie Soong in the Network Ten drama miniseries Tanamera – Lion of Singapore. She also had a lead role as Yoshie in the 1987 Australian horror film Zombie Brigade.

In 1991, Lam played the Shitsu Tonka Newsreader in the ABC TV Doug Anthony All Stars comedy series DAAS Kapital. In 1994 and 1995, she appeared in several episodes of Neighbours as Ling Mai Chan, the daughter of Lou Carpenter.

Lam has also worked as a producer on ABC travel documentary Race Around the World.

In 1998, Lam wrote a recipe book, Eating In: a Post Modern Posthaste Experience, which was published by Hodder Headline.

After studying a Graduate Diploma in Library and Information Management from TAFE NSW from 2009 to 2011 and gaining a Bachelor of Arts from RMIT, Lam has worked in the legal industry, having worked at MinterEllison and Sparke Helmore Lawyers.

== Personal life ==
Lam met Doug Anthony All Stars member Richard Fidler while working on DAAS Kapital. They went on to marry in 1993 and had a son and a daughter.

== Filmography ==
=== Film ===
| Year | Title | Role | Notes |
|---|---|---|---|
| 1987 | Zombie Brigade | Yoshie | |

=== Television ===
| Year | Title | Role | Notes |
|---|---|---|---|
| 1987 | The Henderson Kids II | Ahn Nguyen | 12 episodes |
| 1989 | The Magistrate | Passport Officer | Miniseries, 2 episodes |
| 1989 | The Saint in Australia | Raeleen | TV movie |
| 1989–1992 | Tanamera – Lion of Singapore | Julie Soong | Miniseries, 7 episodes |
| 1990 | The Flying Doctors | Lou | 1 episode |
| 1990 | Flair | Mira | Miniseries, 2 episodes |
| 1990–1992 | Embassy | Lily / Josie | 2 episodes |
| 1991 | All Together Now | Rita | 1 episode |
| 1991 | Boys from the Bush | Malee | Season 1, episode 1: "The Stuffed Platypus" |
| 1991–1992 | DAAS Kapital | Shitsu Tonka Newsreader | 14 episodes |
| 1992 | Chances | Maya | 1 episode |
| 1994–1995 | Neighbours | Ling Mai Chan | 8 episodes |
| 1995 | Singapore Sling: Midnight Orchid | Theresa Liu | TV movie |
| 1997 | Water Rats | Dr Young | 1 episode |
