= Paul Livingston =

Australian comedian

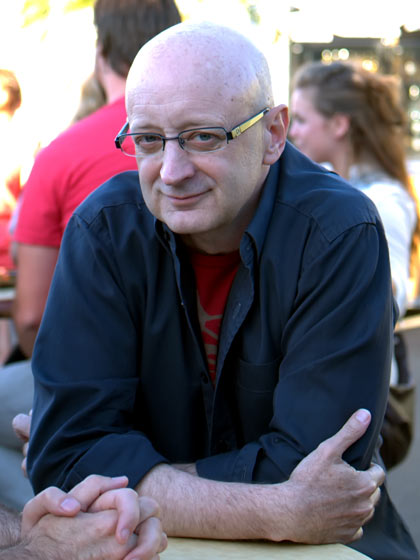
- Flacco Surf N' Turf Benefit for Wayne Goodwin at Mona Vale, November 2007
- Born: Paul James Livingston; March 1956 (age 70); Sydney, New South Wales, Australia
- Occupations: Comedian; author
- Television: The Sideshow; The Sandman; Flacco Special; The Big Gig

Paul James Livingston (born March 1956), popularly known as his alter ego Flacco, is an Australian comedian who has regularly appeared on many television shows, predominantly on ABC TV and Network Ten, including Good News Week, The Sandman and Flacco Special, The Big Gig, DAAS Kapital, The Money or the Gun, The Fat and The Sideshow. He also was on Triple J Breakfast from 1994 to 1997, Doom Runners (1997), and is on ABC Radio National. He has also acted on stage and in film. He was joint winner of the Sidney Myer Performing Arts Award in 1996 for outstanding achievement in the performing arts in Australia. Livingston also wrote the play Emma's Nose about the relationship of Sigmund Freud, Wilhelm Fliess and their patient Emma Eckstein. Livingston also starred in The Navigator: A Medieval Odyssey by Vincent Ward.

Livingston has toured Australia and internationally and appeared at festivals in Edinburgh and Montreal. In 2014, he replaced Richard Fidler as the guitarist in the reformed Doug Anthony All Stars, and toured with Tim Ferguson and Paul McDermott.

== Flacco ==
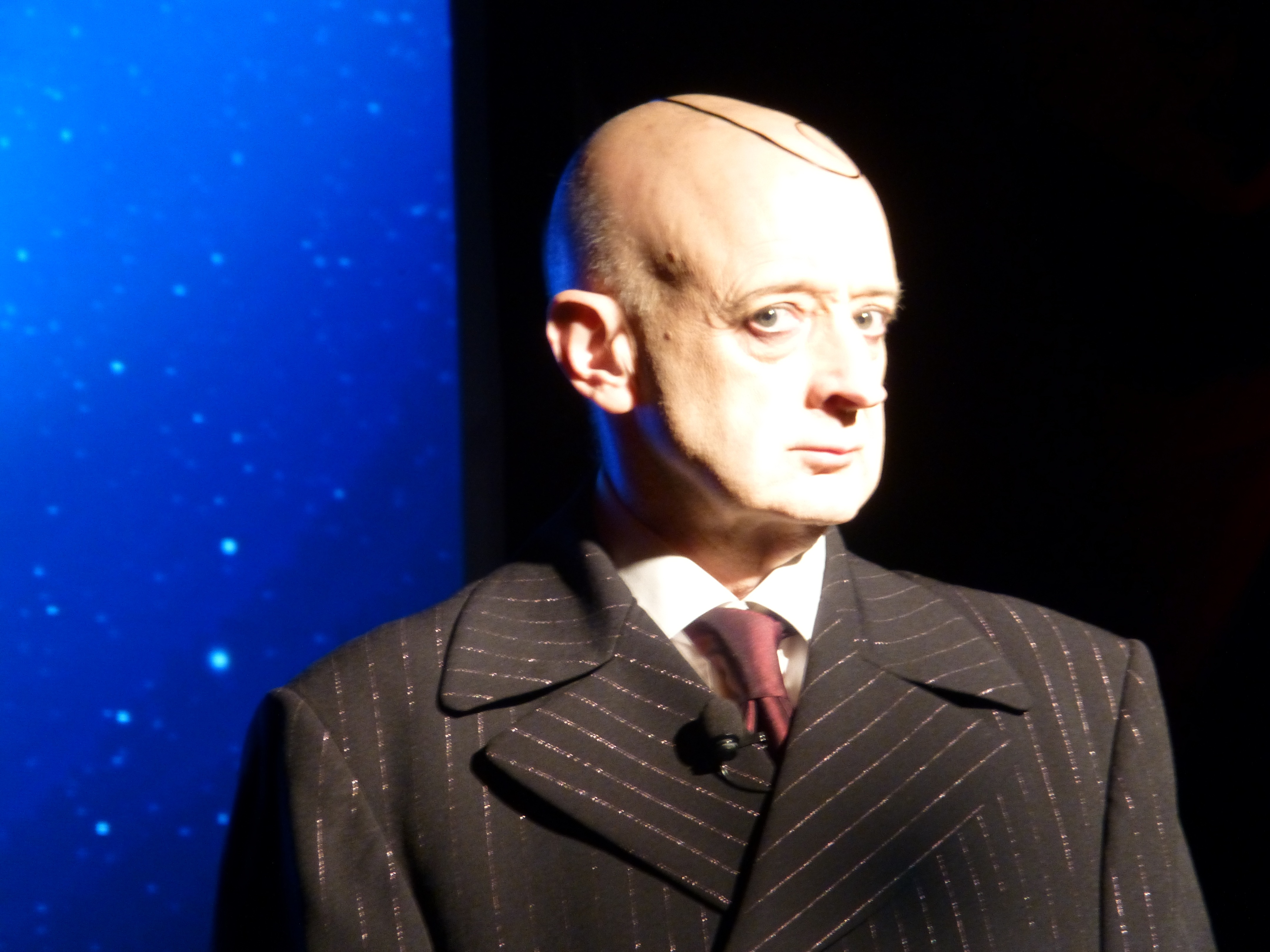
Paul Livingston in character as Flacco

Flacco is a fictional character played by Paul Livingston. Livingston created the character in 1985, when he got up on stage as part of a bet, and the audience mistook his nervousness for a comedic character. Flacco's trademark curl of hair on a pale bald head was originally Livingston's actual hair, until actual baldness forced him to use hairpieces.

In 2009, a portrait by Paul Jackson of Livingston in character as Flacco won the Packing Room Prize as part of the Archibald Prize.

Flacco was an outsider whose observations of people took on an almost alien quality. He had a completely bald head with a single stylised (thick) strand of hair in a coil, and was frequently seen in a suit. He made quick observations often interspersed with incorrect movie, theatre or cultural quotes.

Dom Romeo: ...so I remember episodes of DAAS Kapital when he'd say things like "I could have been a container". That's a dumb mis-remembering of "I coulda been a contender" from On the Waterfront, but because it's from On the Waterfront a 'container' makes perfect sense. Paul Livingston: I know, and it's one of my favourite quotes, actually. I'm glad you liked that one. Flacco does have the appearance of knowledge. He seems to know something, but at the same time, appear completely dumb. That is something that I picked up off the Doug Anthony Allstars, too, because they do their shows and they'd be throwing in names like Nietzche [sic] and stuff like that and people would suddenly think they're intelligent because you've mentioned certain people and a lot of it is just playing at it, a lot of it is just that 'trickster' character who's pretending to be something that they're not. In Flacco's case, one second he's pretending he's really intelligent, and in the next, he's pretending he's really dumb. He's probably really both of those things.

=== Television appearances ===
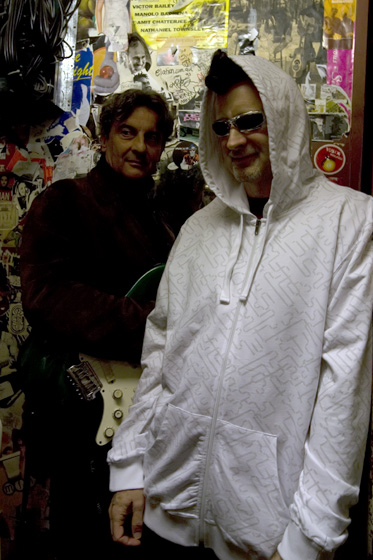
Flacco (right) with The Sandman (Steve Abbott)

Flacco first appeared on television in 1988 on Andrew Denton's Blah Blah Blah and came to prominence the following year on The Big Gig, as an alien who engaged in observational humour. He reprised the role, also as an alien in DAAS Kapital, a sitcom featuring fellow Big Gig alumni the Doug Anthony All Stars (DAAS).

His appearances on Good News Week paired him with the Sandman (played by Steve Abbott), and the two characters appeared together frequently live and on television.

In 2007, Flacco made regular appearances on the ABC1 show The Sideshow alongside Abbott and Paul McDermott, with Gordon Farrer of The Sydney Morning Herald calling the show a "living link to an earlier era of Australian culture", due to the presence of Flacco, the Sandman and former DAAS member McDermott as comedians of the 1990s.

A holographic video display featuring Flacco sat at the Black Mountain Tower in Canberra during the 1990s in their now-removed "Making Connections" exhibition.

== Publications ==
- Flacco's Burnt Offerings (1995) Penguin ISBN 0-14-024782-3
- The Dirt Bath (1998), Penguin, ISBN 0-14-025622-9
- The Flacco Files (1999), Allen and Unwin (originally in "The Australian Weekend Magazine".ISBN 1-86508-226-0
- Releasing the Imbecile Within : An Incomplete Idiot's Guide (2003), Allen & Unwin. ISBN 1-74114-069-2
- Absent without leave: the private war of Private Stanley Livingston (2013), Allen & Unwin. ISBN 9781743315828
- DAAS: Their Part in My Downfall (2016), Allen & Unwin. ISBN 9781760290764

== Filmography ==
=== Film ===
- The Navigator: A Medieval Odyssey (1988)
- Until the End of the World (1991)
- Babe (1995) (voice)
- Children of the Revolution (1996)
- Dark City (1998)
- Babe: Pig in the City (1998)
- Mr. Accident (2000)
- Goddess (2013)
