= Zombie Brigade =

- Directed by: Carmelo Musca; Barrie Pattison
- Written by: Carmelo Musca; Barrie Pattison
- Produced by: Carmelo Musca; Barrie Pattison
- Starring: John Moore; Khym Lam
- Cinematography: Alex McPhee
- Edited by: Tang Thien Tai
- Music by: John Charles; Todd Hunter
- Release date: 1988
- Running time: 91 min
- Country: Australia
- Language: English
- Budget: $855,000

Zombie Brigade is an Australian zombie film. It was written, directed and produced by Carmelo Musca and Barrie Pattison. It screened at Cannes Film Festival in May 1988 but did not get a cinema release. It got a video release in Australia in August 1990.

== Premise ==
In a small country town, Mayor Ransom buys up land to develop a theme park. Council officials blast a Vietnam War memorial, unleashing monsters.

== Production ==
The script was written originally by Barrie Pattison who brought it to Carmelo Musca, who liked the idea of doing a genre piece with some social commentary. The state funding body Screen West refused to invest in the film. It was shot in Toodyay, Western Australia.

== Cast ==
- John Moore as Harry Dare
- Khym Lam as Yoshie
- Geoff Gibbs as Mayor Ransom
- Ron Lee as Kinoshita (as Adam A. Wong)
- Leslie Wright as Constable Bill Jackson
- Robert Faggetter as Wild

== Reception ==
According to the filmmakers, "the film made back money four or five times over for the investors".

David Stratton wrote in Variety "Pacing is too slow and, crucially, scenes of carnage are too tame. Also, many of the supporting actors are amateurish." Peter West of Horror Talk gave it 2 1/2 stars and called it an "amusing movie at times." HorrorNews.net's Nigel Honeybone says "It’s definitely a zombie movie, but there’s a twist: these are good zombies with moral values, ethics, mercy and valor." and notes that "The two protagonists, for example, is an Aboriginal male and a Japanese female, which immediately challenges the viewer’s expectations."
