= Till Human Voices Wake Us (film) =

- Theatrical release poster
- Directed by: Michael Petroni
- Written by: Michael Petroni
- Produced by: Thomas Augsberger
- Starring: Guy Pearce; Helena Bonham Carter
- Cinematography: Roger Lanser
- Edited by: Bill Murphy
- Music by: Dale Cornelius; Amotz Plessner
- Distributed by: Becker Entertainment
- Release date: 12 September 2002
- Running time: 101 minutes
- Country: Australia
- Language: English
- Box office: $120,601

Till Human Voices Wake Us is a 2002 Australian drama film written and directed by Michael Petroni and starring Guy Pearce and Helena Bonham Carter.

== Plot ==
Fifteen-year-old Sam Franks has returned from a Melbourne boarding school to his hometown in Victoria. He has an obvious affection towards a local girl, Silvy, who has a disability affecting her legs which requires a brace and prevents her from walking freely. This does not stop the two friends from enjoying each other's company, and they are virtually inseparable. Sam's mother has died, and his stern father provides the young boy with little comfort or love, so his relationship with Silvy is all that matters to him. She reads to him regularly out of her beloved poetry book, showing him a world of beauty and harmony within words that he comes to enjoy.

One night, Sam and Silvy decide to go for an aimless ride, and end up at a river. Sam jumps in the water and removes Silvy's leg braces, and together they "dance" in the water. They share a kiss and stare into the stars — everything seems perfect for them. Sam lets go of Silvy's hand to point to a shooting star. After closing his eyes and making a wish, he looks around to find Silvy no longer with him. After a frantic search as he struggles against the current, Sam returns to Silvy's home to tell her parents what has happened. Her body is not found until much later, in an underwater cave.

Twenty years later, 35-year-old Sam is teaching psychology at a Melbourne institute when he must return to his hometown to bury his recently deceased father. On the train, Sam briefly meets a pleasant woman who introduces herself as Ruby. Sam leaves the compartment to talk to the conductor about his father's casket. When he returns, the woman is nowhere to be seen. That night, in a massive downpour, Sam sees a woman fall from the bridge into the river below. He rescues the woman and finds that it is Ruby. She has lost her memory and can't remember her own name. The woman's behavior and speech patterns remind Sam of Silvy.

Sam hypnotizes her, and the woman describes being pulled down, lower and lower into the cold, and feelings of panic, followed by a sensation of warmth and comfort. Sam believes that Silvy has come back from death in the form of this woman. The next day, she asks to be taken to her "real home". Sam carries her because her legs are failing her once more; he senses that she will not be with him much longer. Safe and warm in her old bed in her abandoned childhood home, Sam reads her the last few lines from her favorite poem, T. S. Eliot's "The Love Song of J. Alfred Prufrock": "Till human voices wake us, and we drown." She dies with a smile on her lips. Sam places her in a boat and releases it onto the river. He swims with it for a while, and when he looks into it, all that remains is his coat that he had draped over her. He climbs into the boat as it drifts away.

== Cast ==
- Guy Pearce as Sam Franks
- Brooke Harman as Silvy Lewis
- Helena Bonham Carter as Ruby
- Amanda Douge as Katherine
- Frank Gallacher as Maurie Lewis
- Peter Curtin as Dr Davis Franks

== Box office ==
Till Human Voices Wake Us grossed $181,921 at the box office in Australia.

== See also ==
- Cinema of Australia
