= Miracles (TV series) =

American television series

- Genre: Drama; Horror; Suspense; Science fiction Mystery
- Created by: Michael Petroni; Richard Hatem
- Starring: Skeet Ulrich; Angus Macfadyen; Marisa Ramirez
- Theme music composer: W.G. Snuffy Walden; Joseph Williams
- Country of origin: United States
- Original language: English
- No. of seasons: 1
- No. of episodes: 13

Production
- Executive producers: David Greenwalt; Matt Reeves; Michael Petroni
- Producers: Dennis Stuart Murphy; Christian Taylor
- Production locations: Los Angeles, California, USA
- Running time: 42 minutes
- Production companies: David Greenwalt Productions; Spyglass Entertainment; Touchstone Television

Original release
- Network: ABC
- Release: January 27 – March 31, 2003
- Network: VisionTV
- Release: November 14 – December 26, 2003

Miracles is an American mystery drama television series starring Skeet Ulrich and Angus Macfadyen that aired on ABC from January 27 to March 31, 2003. The series created by Richard Hatem and Michael Petroni, the series was dubbed a "spiritual version of The X-Files" by its creators. Following the pilot, David Greenwalt, co-creator of Angel (the spin-off of Buffy the Vampire Slayer) served as the show's executive producer and head writer for the remaining twelve episodes.

Miracles follows Paul Callan, an investigator of modern miracles for the Catholic Church who questions his faith after repeatedly finding mundane explanations for various supposed supernatural phenomena. After he witnesses a true, supernatural miracle that saves his life, only for his findings to be dismissed on a lack of evidence, Paul leaves the Church behind and is approached by Alva Keel to join his organization Sodalitas Quaerito (Latin for "Brotherhood in search of truth"), investigating and cataloging "unexplainable" supernatural phenomena. Along with former police officer Evelyn Santos, Paul and Alva attempt to battle the impending "darkness" before it's too late.

The series premiered as part of ABC's "Super Monday" line-up on January 27, 2003. Six episodes were broadcast on ABC before the series was canceled because of low ratings, with its final broadcast episode drawing five million viewers on March 31, 2003. The series was preempted a number of times during its run, once for a rebroadcast of the documentary special Living with Michael Jackson, and various other times to air repeats or news magazine specials about the then-developing Iraq War. Miracles fans, angered by the cancellation and what they saw as ABC's mismanagement of the show's Monday 10:00pm time slot, began a fan campaign to revive the show. Fans wrote messages on napkins (referencing a plot point in the pilot episode) and mailed them to various networks hoping the show would be revived by another broadcaster; however, efforts were unsuccessful and the show did not continue past its initial order of thirteen episodes.

== Plot ==
The series begins as Paul Callan (Skeet Ulrich), an investigator of modern miracles for the Catholic Church at the Archdiocese of Boston, is feeling frustrated with disappointing groups of believers each time he investigates and disproves the authenticity of a supposed "miracle". Upon the advice of his mentor, Father "Poppi" Calero (Héctor Elizondo), Paul takes a sabbatical. Months later while doing humanitarian work in Arizona, Paul receives a phone call from Poppi asking him to investigate the case of a young boy with supposed healing powers in the nearby town of Cottonwood. Paul finally sees a true miracle when he sees that young Tommy Ferguson (Jacob Smith) can truly heal people, but every time Tommy heals someone, his own rare disease worsens. When Paul is involved in a near fatal car accident, Tommy uses his healing power for the last time and dies healing Paul, but not before both of them see Paul's blood form itself into the words "God is Now Here" on his broken windshield.

His faith restored, Paul returns to the Church, only for the Monsignor to dismiss his report on a lack of proof. Paul resigns out of frustration and discovers that Poppi never called him about Tommy Ferguson's case. Later, Paul is approached at a diner by a man named Alva Keel (Angus Macfadyen), who offers him a job with his organization, Sodalitas Quaerito (Latin for "Brotherhood in search of truth"). Keel tells Paul that his encounter with "hemography" (blood forming itself into readable words) is part of a large, dark impending event; the same miracle has appeared to six other people in the past 25 years, only every other time the message appeared as "God is Nowhere". Paul teams up with Keel and Evelyn Santos (Marisa Ramirez), a former police officer, to investigate his paranormal experience and discover a solution to the impending darkness.

== Cast ==
=== Main ===
- Skeet Ulrich as Paul Callan, a former investigator of modern miracles for the Catholic Church. Paul was an orphan from a very young age; his mother died when he was only five years old of an unknown ailment, and he never met his biological father. When he was seven years old, he spent two weeks at St. Jerome's Hospital being treated for pneumonia, which he nearly died from. Paul resigned from the church after the monsignor dismissed his report on the Tommy Ferguson case. He then teamed up with Alva Keel and Evelyn Santos and began working for "Sodalitas Quaerito".
- Angus Macfadyen as Alva Keel, a former Harvard professor. While minoring in linguistics at Cambridge University, he began his senior project studying bird calls and recorded several of them on tapes. While playing them back, he began hearing his deceased mother's voice repeating a childhood nickname of his amongst the bird calls. In 1998 he founded Sodalitas Quaerito, a small business that investigates and catalogues various supposed supernatural phenomena, to fund his research.
- Marisa Ramirez as Evelyn Santos, a former police officer and single mother. The father of her child, John, is in prison. Little is known about how she came to work with Keel, but it was revealed in a deleted scene that she was shot in the head in the line of duty, and had a paranormal experience where she believes she saw that there was nothing on "the other side".

=== Recurring ===
- Héctor Elizondo as Father "Poppi" Calero, Paul's mentor throughout his entire life, who is a father at the church where Paul grew up and used to work. Appeared in the pilot episode, and then reappeared in later episodes of the series.
- Jacob Smith as Thomas "Tommy" Ferguson, a ten-year-old boy from Cottonwood, Arizona with healing powers. His power was discovered after he hugged his grandmother, who had lung cancer, and told her he hoped she felt better; his grandmother then left the hospital two days later, when her cancer completely disappeared. Sacrificed his own life to save Paul Callan's after his car was hit by a train, leaving him in a state of near death. Tommy appeared in the pilot episode, and then appeared as a ghost in the episodes "Little Miss Lost" and "Paul is Dead".

== Production ==
=== Origins ===
Series creator Richard Hatem was sent a screenplay in early 2001 called "Miracles", written by Michael Petroni and owned by Spyglass Entertainment. Hatem assumed that he was being sent the script to re-write, and the script would then be made into a feature film. Hatem recalled in "The Making of Miracles" interview on the Miracles DVD set that he was puzzled when he was sent the script to re-write, because he thought it was "pretty wonderful as it [was]". Hatem's agent later confirmed to him that Spyglass actually wanted him to use the screenplay as a jumping off point to create a one-hour television series, "a sort of 'spiritual X-Files".

When Hatem met with executives at Spyglass, he brought with him a "good luck charm," the book The Physical Phenomena of Mysticism by Herbert Thurston, which Hatem said Miracles later "evolved into." Thurston was an Anglican minister who investigated spiritual phenomena during the 1920s and 1930s, when, according to Hatem, "spiritualism (the contacting of the dead through séances and mediums) was still popular in America." The book examined which phenomena were signs from God, and which were "something else." After discussing this with Megan Wolpert and Suzanne Patmore, executives at Spyglass, Hatem said "what [he] expected would be a 20-minute meeting turned into a three hour meeting, where ideas were flowing back and forth." Hatem claimed the show was born "that day, in that room" in March 2001. Hatem, Wolpert, and Patmore liked the idea that a character (Paul Callan) who came from a strict religious background and was raised to believe that any strange occurrence was either a sign from God or a sign from the devil, was suddenly thrust into a world where various phenomena "crossed those boundaries" and could not be classified as "good or bad" because they had elements of both. Hatem believes this is the element that "creates the drama," and makes the show "fun and scary."

Hatem, Wolpert, and Patmore researched various supernatural and religious folklore and found that most of those types of encounters could "find a nexis in [Miracles], and [they] could do all kinds of stories". The three also agreed that "[Miracles] could not be a show about the Catholic Church [...] ABC was not interested in taking that on". Hatem referenced in the Miracles DVD interview a short-lived series that aired on ABC during the 1997–98 season called Nothing Sacred, which centered on the Catholic Church in the 1970s. While the show's main character was raised with a Catholic upbringing, Hatem did not want to make the series about a "Vatican conspiracy". Hatem did however acknowledge that the pilot episode transitioned from religious phenomena to paranormal phenomena, and that the transition between "'religion' and 'general paranormal' [was a huge challenge] all the way through, because the questions kept coming back: 'Is this guy a priest?'; 'How do we explain he's not a priest?'; 'How do we explain that his points of view are not the points of view of the Catholic Church?'". Hatem also acknowledged that as they were preparing to "sell a show whose pilot has priests, and a monsignor", the Church was in the midst of a sex abuse scandal that was being reported in newspapers all over the country. Hatem recalled that "the joke was, '[the show wasn't] on the air long enough to generate controversy'; we would have loved controversy, but we flew so low under the radar that I don't think anyone had a chance to be offended or even construe a way to take offense".

=== Casting ===
The production team had many ideas for casting, and Richard Hatem says that Skeet Ulrich was one of the first ideas for an actor to play Paul Callan. However, the producers believed that Ulrich was "unavailable", and that he was taking a break from acting and living with his wife and kids in Virginia. Among the other actors who auditioned for Paul Callan were Matthew Fox, known for his starring role on the series Party of Five and who went on to star in Lost, and Jason Priestley, which Hatem says "would have been an excellent casting pun". During auditions, a Miracles producer learned that Ulrich had been sent the script by his agents and managers, and that he had "really responded to it". Matt Reeves, the director of the pilot, was impressed that he was able to exude soulfulness, emotion, and intelligence without speaking.

Hatem said that when casting the part of Alva Keel, a mysterious person was necessary for the role, "someone who would draw Paul away from the Church and bring him into this strange world of paranormal investigation". Donald Sutherland was an original casting idea, because the producers originally wanted someone who was around the same age as Hector Elizondo, to persuade Paul to leave behind one father figure and follow another. However, after many people auditioned, the producers took note of Angus Macfadyen's ability to without speaking, like Ulrich, portray intensity and mystery. The casting of Macfadyen gave the producers the idea of instead of following a new father figure, Paul Callan would join a group based on "brotherhood", "someone who was more of an age contemporary with Paul".

Hatem recalls casting the part of Evelyn Santos as "difficult, because technically, she doesn't exist in the pilot; she has one shot in the first episode, and in the original pilot, she was played by a different actress". Because Evelyn has no real lines in the pilot episode, extensive casting was not held. After the pilot was picked up, the producers faced the challenge of casting a character "for whom [they] had never written anything". Producers cast Marisa Ramirez very late in the audition process, after the episode "The Ghost" had already been filmed. Ramirez was cast because the producers wanted someone "watchable" and at the same time "normal, and real" as a contrast to Paul and Keel, who had each lived unusual lives. Hatem described the three leads as a "weird, paranormal Brady Bunch" because of each of the characters' non-nuclear families.

=== Development ===
Richard Hatem says that the backdrop of the stories of Miracles were intentionally made to be those of everyday life, to better connect with the audience. Hatem acknowledged Stephen King as a powerful influence in the development of Miracles, as well as his own career; in the DVD interview he commented that "if you tell people you want to do something like Stephen King, people will listen to you". He references a book in his personal collection about a haunted apartment complex in Santa Ana, California, which Hatem claims to "love more than anything"; "I would love to visit the haunted apartment complex in Santa Ana". Hatem recalls enjoying the "haunted gas station mini mart" from the episode The Battle at Shadow Ridge, which he claimed to possibly be the "goofiest" episode of the series; Hatem said, "If a gas station mini mart can be haunted, then I can go to sleep a happy man; then I know this world is truly a special place".

Richard Hatem joked that he and David Greenwalt adopted mundane as the "buzzword" of the series, although they never told anyone because "that's not what a network likes to hear". Hatem and Greenwalt used the idea of "mundane" throughout the series as a way of showing the audience that strange occurrences can happen in everyday places. Hatem recalled that despite hoping and expecting that the series would be on the air for as many as ten seasons, he and Greenwalt had not fully mapped out a "ten-season-long mythology" of the show where the question "Darkness or light?" would ultimately be answered. Hatem references the "two kinds of episodes of The X-Files: 'stand-alones', and 'mythology episodes'", and holding a preference for stand-alone episodes because when the mythology starts to be unraveled, "that's when it becomes no fun anymore".

=== Themes ===
Richard Hatem addressed in DVD commentary and interviews some of the show's more frequent themes.

==== Parent losing a child ====
This theme was used to some degree in the following episodes:

- "The Ferguson Syndrome", wherein the Fergusons lose their son Tommy after he saved Paul's life
- "The Patient", wherein Dr. Bauer loses his daughter Raina to Sakovsky's syndrome
- "Little Miss Lost", wherein Rosanna Wye has to confront her missing, deceased child after 60 years
- "The Bone Scatterer", wherein Travis Prescott's miscarried brother Jimmy acts as his guardian angel
- "Mother's Daughter", wherein the Cotrells are forced to give up their daughter Hannah and stop Lucinda Morgan Bryant from committing suicide
- "The Ghost", wherein Larry Kittredge is haunted by the poltergeist of his deceased son
- "The Letter", wherein Georgia Wilson receives letters from her dead father, ghostwritten through a death row inmate
- "Paul is Dead", wherein Paul loses Evelyn's son Matty at a playground

==== Other themes ====
Richard Hatem addressed the theme of the episodes "The Ghost" and "The Letter", which were both "conceived" around the same time. Both episodes explored the idea of living people making contact with the spirit of someone who used to be a part of their lives, but who was now deceased. In "The Ghost", Larry Kittredge believes his dead son Kevin is haunting the realty office where he works; in "The Letter", Georgia Wilson begins receiving letters from her dead father, written through his murderer, death row inmate Edward Dubek. In both episodes, the conclusion both characters reached was it was best to save a "terrestrial relationship" (Larry Kittredge's relationship with his wife and Georgia Wilson's relationships with Paul and Poppi) rather than continue to explore a "possibly unreal spiritual relationship".

Richard Hatem lists "Saint Debbie" amongst his favorite episodes, partly because of its theme, and claims to be one of the few people who like the episode. Hatem says that "Saint Debbie" is the only episode to include "no real psychic phenomena", but is rather the story of an "everyday miracle".

=== Post-cancellation ===
Had the show been an "enormous success", Richard Hatem says a "modest plan was in place of where the show would have gone". The series would have continued the mythology of Paul's destiny: whether or not Paul was destined for good or evil, and the amount of control he had over his own destiny. Ideas included more close-ended stories and further exploring the backstories of Alva Keel and Evelyn Santos, as well as some ideas for unproduced episodes which were "very much in vein of the thirteen [produced episodes]"; however, the producers never saw much further than that.

In 2022, TVLine include Miracles on their list of the best one-season shows.

== Episodes ==
No.	Title	Directed by	Written by	Original release date	U.S. viewers (millions)
1	"The Ferguson Syndrome"	Matt Reeves	Story by : Michael Petroni & Richard Hatem; Teleplay by : Richard Hatem	January 27, 2003	8.74
Paul Callan, an investigator of modern miracles for the Catholic church, finds himself frustrated by continually disappointing genuine believers with mundane explanations for supposed signs from God. Feeling he is losing his faith, Paul requests a sabbatical, which his father figure and mentor in the church, Father "Poppi" Calero, allows. While on leave, Paul receives a phone call from Poppi asking him to investigate a nearby case of a boy in Arizona with supposed healing powers. Paul meets Tommy Ferguson and the two realize they each shared a disturbing dream predicting they would meet. Paul learns Tommy has cured afflictions ranging from cancer to blindness solely by hugging them and telling them he hopes they feel better soon. These acts, however, worsen Tommy's own rare form of anemia, and create tension amongst his parents: Tommy's father believes his powers are a gift from God and should be used, while his mother seeks to protect him, eventually trying to take Tommy away in the middle of the night. Paul follows them but loses control of his car and is hit by an oncoming train, leaving him gravely injured. Tommy finds Paul, where they both see his blood drip onto broken glass and form itself into the words "God is now here". Tommy heals Paul of his injuries, but the act kills Tommy. His faith restored, Paul returns to the church and delivers his report to the monsignor, who is dismissive based on the report's lack of evidence. Paul quits and is shocked when Poppi tells him he never called him about Tommy. Paul is later approached by Alva Keel, a mysterious figure who runs his own organization called Sodalitas Quaerito which examines unexplainable phenomena. Keel tells Paul that his experience is connected to an impending darkness and convinces him to join his research.
2	"The Friendly Skies"	Jesus S. Trevino	Story by : Chris Brancato & Albert J. Salke; Teleplay by : David Greenwalt & Richard Hatem	February 3, 2003	7.13
At Boston's Logan Airport, air traffic control watches a commercial aircraft vanish, only for the plane to reappear and land safely 64 seconds later. Sodalitas Quaerito is dispatched to the scene to aid in the investigation by one of the case's lead investigators with the FBI, a former classmate of Keel's. Paul, Keel and their colleague Evelyn Santos learn that the passengers all had unique experiences during the 64 seconds which corresponded to whatever they were thinking about at the time the plane disappeared. A young girl thinking about her future sees several underwhelming decades of her adult life, a flight attendant frustrated by his menial job shares complex theories of world domination, and a passenger deathly afraid of plane crashes burns to death despite no evidence of a fire. Paul meets Karen, who suffered a severe brain injury years earlier that left her immobile and mute. Asleep at the time of the plane's disappearance and dreaming of being able to walk again, Karen appears completely healed. Realizing that the effects of the passengers' experiences are wearing off, Paul tries to reunite Karen with her husband Mark before she loses the ability to communicate, but they are apprehended by the heavy military presence at the airport. With the help of Evelyn, Paul is able to smuggle out of the airport a video recording of Karen telling Paul all the things she has wanted to say to Mark since her accident. Some time later, Paul visits Karen's home and delivers the tape to Mark, who watches the tape at Karen's side, touched by her words.
3	"The Patient"	Michael Rhodes	David Greenwalt	February 10, 2003	6.32
Paul and Keel attend a medical symposium concerning Sakovsky's syndrome, a disease whose patients according to Keel have shown connections to the paranormal. Paul meets and becomes attracted to Raina Bauer, the sharp and beautiful daughter of the brilliant, workaholic scientist Dr. Bauer speaking at the symposium and working on a cure for the disease. Dr. Bauer believes he has made an incredible breakthrough with patient Sherwood Nichols, who almost instantly transitions from being completely non-communicative to offering greatly detailed theories on how to cure his illness. Sodalitas Quaerito investigates Sherwood's supposedly astounding progress only to discover he is actually being possessed by an evil "merry prankster" energy calling himself "Mr. Friendly". The entity convinces Dr. Bauer to overdose the patients and himself, and Raina is able to alert SQ in time in order for them to save the patients and Dr. Bauer, while freeing Sherwood from the influence of the entity. Paul is stunned to learn that Raina herself died of Sakovsky's over two years earlier. He visits her grave, where clouds part and the sun shines on her headstone, as he realizes there is more than just darkness on the other side.
4	"Little Miss Lost"	Marita Grabiak	Zack Estrin & Chris Levinson	March 3, 2003	6.38
Paul steps off a bus and notices a little girl in the window holding a green balloon. The bus drives away down the street before it suddenly explodes, knocking Paul to the ground. He awakens in the hospital where Keel and Evelyn tell him the bus stopped over an open sewer and exploded due to a gas leak, killing everyone on board. Shortly after, Paul sees the same little girl while watching a live newscast outside a sports arena in San Antonio. He later watches the footage back but the girl is nowhere to be seen. That night, Paul learns that a portion of the stadium collapsed during a basketball game resulting in several deaths including a young girl. He travels to San Antonio and is horrified to discover she is the same girl from the bus explosion in Boston, whose remains had already been cremated after going unclaimed. Though they initially believe the girl is trying to warn Paul of various disasters, SQ eventually comes to realize she is actually causing them, as they connect her to various past tragedies over a 60-year period in which the body of a young girl was the only unclaimed victim. The trio eventually identify her as Amelia Wye, a 7-year-old girl who died in a Connecticut circus fire in 1944 and went unclaimed after her mother Rosanna feared coming forward would draw the attention of the abusive ex-husband she and her daughter had escaped. They help Rosanna finally lay Amelia to rest. The ghost of Tommy Ferguson reappears to Paul, warning him that "the darkness" is real and "wants everything".
5	"The Bone Scatterer"	Terrence O'Hara	David Graziano	March 10, 2003	5.74
SQ receives an anonymous call from a terrified man who claims that his gruesome dreams in which people are violently killed are becoming a reality. The trio head to Red Deer, Michigan where they meet the caller, 13-year-old Travis Prescott, who is being raised by his widowed and abusive father, also the town's sheriff. Travis tells them his friend Jimmy is the only person who actually looks out for him. While learning about the victims, Paul, Keel and Evelyn conclude they are connected to Travis as each had the opportunity to protect him from his father's physical abuse but failed to do so. They soon discover that Jimmy is actually the protective spirit of Travis' twin brother who died in utero and has been committing the murders in a quest for vengeance. Travis' love for his father has been protecting Sheriff Prescott from Jimmy's attacks, but Jimmy finally confronts and kills Sheriff Prescott before thanking SQ for standing up for Travis, who is taken in by his compassionate aunt, the sister of his late mother.
6	"Hand of God"	Bill D'Elia	Richard Hatem	March 31, 2003	4.96
Paul is approached by a police detective following the murder of Gretchen Albright, a woman who had Paul's name and face sketched in a journal of hers. He later learns from Keel that Gretchen was one of the six people he interviewed who experienced hemography and saw their blood form the words "God is Nowhere". Paul is unsatisfied with Keel's explanation for how she might have known Paul, so he breaks into Keel's office and discovers in his files that all six witnesses to the "God is Nowhere" message also had dreams about him, some of which concerned actual events in his life years before they happened. Paul is furious that Keel has kept this information from him. He tells Keel that four of the six witnesses are now dead, all having been murdered in the last week, of which Keel was unaware. Paul travels to Denver to meet with Danielle Franklin, one of the two remaining witnesses, but is detained by local police upon arrival. Danielle is killed before she can reach Paul. Paul meets who he thinks is Kenneth Webster, the final living witness, at his home in Oregon, only to instead find Chad Goodwell, a disturbed young man who has been killing the "God is Nowhere" witnesses. Chad attacks Paul and Kenneth, and Chad and Paul are apprehended by the police. Chad tells Paul that Tommy comes to him too, and that he also saw the words "God is Now Here" written in his blood. Chad says the voice of God has been speaking to him in his head and has convinced him that the "people who saw the words all wrong" needed to be killed. At the police station, Chad grabs an officer's gun and commits suicide. Paul returns to SQ and tells Keel he is not committing to staying on, but is open to hearing about Keel's latest case.
7	"You Are My Sunshine"	Paul Shapiro	Christian Taylor	November 14, 2003	N/A
Paul receives a phone call from a hospital in upstate New York regarding Rebecca Webb, an ex-girlfriend he broke up with years ago but whose emergency contact card he is still on. He travels to Saugerties and offers to nurse her back to health from an injury she sustained in the house she is renting. Paul and Rebecca quickly rekindle their romance, but a malign energy in the house begins to draw out Paul's dark side, amplifying his anger and jealousy. He becomes emotionally and physically abusive, including on a phone call with Evelyn that concerns her so much she and Keel drive up from Boston to check on him. Keel learns from a local realtor that the house was owned for many years by a reclusive woman that local children called "Spooky Spencer". Evelyn returns to the house, where Paul locks her and Rebecca in the basement. The women uncover a hidden door concealing the decaying bodies of Mrs. Spencer's husband and the woman he had an affair with, whom she killed. The dark energy eventually takes hold of Rebecca, who attempts to scald Paul and Evelyn with hot oil just as Mrs. Spencer did. Keel is able to intercept her and she instead throws the oil onto a burning stove, starting a fire which destroys the house. Rebecca tells Paul he is lucky to have friends who were so concerned about him, and he returns to SQ and reconciles with Keel.
8	"The Battle at Shadow Ridge"	Michael Grossman	David Graziano	November 21, 2003	N/A
Keel insists that SQ travel to Virginia as the state is experiencing "ghost light weather". Paul accompanies him, while Evelyn stays home to plan her son's birthday party. In the town of Shadow Valley, Virginia, children Renata and Gus Jacobson see the ghost of a Civil War soldier in the woods outside their house. Keel and Paul meet the children and their mother Ginny, who is trying to assure the kids that ghosts don't exist. Paul notices blood on Gus's shoe, convincing him and Keel that the kids really did encounter something. At a local convenience store, Paul and Keel hear the sounds of a wagon train in one of the aisles. The store employee makes an announcement on the intercom and the soldiers acknowledge the voice. Keel concludes that electrical energy caused by abnormally high humidity and the town's geological makeup are causing a "time slip", in which events from the past and the present are becoming visible to one another. Henry Tucker, the soldier seen by the Jacobson kids, is able to see the store's brightly illuminated sign, and a bullet he fires at an opposing soldier injures Paul in the present. Paul and Keel learn from Henry's writing that he feared dying in the war not knowing the fate of his wife and child. As the weather begins to cool, they race to deliver a message to Henry before the connection between past and present is broken.
9	"Mother's Daughter"	John Fawcett	Christian Taylor	November 28, 2003	N/A
In Pennsylvania's Amish country, teenager Hannah Cottrell is being treated by her mother Elizabeth for a fever that won't break. Elizabeth is shocked to discover Hannah laying in bed with bloody wrists. Paul and Keel arrive at Lancaster General Hospital where they learn that despite the appearance of stigmata and the doctor's belief that Hannah attempted suicide, she has no actual wounds. Hannah's siblings tell SQ that she has been acting strangely lately, including bouts of sleepwalking where she has been found dancing late at night in the middle of the road. They also learn that Hannah's father drowned several years earlier saving her life after she fell through the ice on a frozen lake, with almost 5 minutes needed to revive Hannah. Paul speaks to Hannah, who exhibits the personality of a troubled urban teen who identifies herself as Lucinda Morgan Bryant and gives Paul a phone number with a New York City area code. Initially believing Hannah's oppressed life and the trauma of her father's death have resulted in a split personality disorder, the phone number leads Paul to discover Lucinda is real, but died of suicide 10 years earlier on the exact same day as Hannah's accident. Keel believes Hannah's "possession" is actually a reincarnation and has resulted in Lucinda now sharing Hannah's body, but gradually assuming total control. Elizabeth must accept that she will lose her daughter while also helping the Bryants avoid further heartbreak as Lucinda's suicidal ideation is re-triggered.
10	"Saint Debbie"	Lawrence Trilling	Richard Hatem	December 5, 2003	N/A
In the small town of Three Springs, California, waitress Debbie Olsen attempts to intervene when the diner where she works is robbed at gunpoint. The robber slices her neck with a knife and flees, upon which the restaurant patrons discover that despite copious amounts of blood, Debbie has no wound and is miraculously unharmed. Father Calero reunites with Paul at SQ, where he asks the trio to investigate as the archdiocese has not filled Paul's position. SQ arrives in Three Springs to find that Debbie has become famous, renewing the faith of the townspeople while also drawing in tourists. A man throws a live rattlesnake at Debbie which bites her, however she is not poisoned, furthering the belief in town that Debbie is invulnerable. Keel and Debbie develop an attraction to one another, and Keel does not want to believe Paul's instinct that all of this is a fraud. However, Paul and Evelyn discover that the man who threw the snake at Debbie was the same man who robbed the diner; both he and Debbie were paid by the mayor to perform the stunts using a prop knife and a snake that had its venom glands surgically removed, in order to drum up business in Three Springs and "put the town on the map". The promise of a $30,000 payday was too tempting to Debbie, who planned to use the money to leave town for Los Angeles with her special needs brother Daniel (who she has taken care of for 11 years following the death of their parents in a car accident) so she could enrol him in a specialized school while she pursued a degree at UCLA. Daniel overhears Debbie's confession and climbs up the town's water tower, threatening to jump to show everyone that Debbie will be able to save him. Debbie reveals the truth to everyone in a desperate attempt to lure Daniel down, however a devout woman points a gun at her and she takes a bullet to save Keel from harm. Doctors are stunned that the bullet missed four major organs and arteries and Debbie makes a full recovery. Using the threat of blackmail, SQ ensures that the mayor will make good on paying Debbie, and she and Daniel are able to leave town and begin their new life.
11	"The Ghost"	John Fawcett	Richard Hatem and David Greenwalt	December 12, 2003	N/A
Paul undergoes a physical and an MRI, as he attempts to rule out a brain tumour as an explanation for his encounters with the deceased. He is given a clean bill of health, and although Keel does not doubt Paul's paranormal experiences have been genuine, he recalls instances of people who have suffered traumatic head injuries becoming convinced they were communicating with the dead. Paul and Keel travel to Lowell, New Jersey where the employees of Larry Kittredge's real estate brokerage have become convinced their office is haunted by a ghost. One of the employees informs the pair that she dated Larry's son Kevin, who died unexpectedly the previous year from bacterial meningitis. Larry denies witnessing any of the strange activity reported by his employees, but eventually admits to Paul that he has experienced the phenomena and welcomes it, as he believes the spirit of Kevin has returned to him and is the fulfilment of an answered prayer. Keel realizes, however, that the haunting is not a ghost but a poltergeist energy - the result of Larry's suppressed grief, anger and unwillingness to truly accept the loss of his son. He resolves to properly grieve Kevin's death and explain the odd occurrences in his office to his wife, from whom he has grown distant since the tragedy. Poppi offers Paul his job back with the church. Paul is confident in his decision to leave and concerned about disappointing his father figure, but receives Poppi's blessing.
12	"The Letter"	Tom Wright	Zack Estrin & Chris Levinson	December 19, 2003	N/A
Paul attends a birthday dinner for his childhood friend Georgia Wilson, who he grew up with in the orphanage. At the dinner, Poppi presents Georgia with the final of a series of letters from her late father, entrusted to Poppi to give to her after he passed away. The next day, Georgia receives another letter in the mail from her father, containing personal details only he could have known about and written in entirely different handwriting. Paul and Evelyn trace the letter's origins to western Connecticut, where they learn the letters were mailed by a prison cook on behalf of death row inmate Edward Dubek. The pair meet with Dubek's defense attorney, who insists that Dubek could not have written the letters as he is illiterate. Dubek himself insists he is writing them, claiming that through God's forgiveness many of his victims are using him to write letters to their loved ones. Paul's explanation of this, particularly the detail that Dubek takes on the penmanship of the person writing through him, leads Georgia to realize that the original letters were not written by her father, but by Poppi. Poppi denies malicious intent, telling Georgia her father was only able to complete one letter before dying, but Georgia feels betrayed. The families of Dubek's victims are gathered by his defense attorney with a request to sign a petition in advance of a leniency hearing that could get Dubek taken off death row. Knowing the letters will stop if Dubek is executed, most of the families sign, and Dubek is released into general population. However he is almost immediately killed by another inmate. Paul reminds Georgia that while her contact with her father is gone, her relationship with Poppi can be saved, and they reconcile.
13	"Paul Is Dead"	Bill D'Elia	David Greenwalt	December 26, 2003	N/A
SQ is hired to investigate local television psychic Jason Herlock by a man whose wife attended a taping and believes Herlock made genuine contact with their deceased daughter. The client hopes to have Herlock exposed as a fraud, so Paul, Keel and Evelyn attend a taping. When Herlock makes physical contact with Paul, Herlock recoils and delivers a cryptic message before collapsing. Later, Paul is at a local park with Evelyn's son Matty when he realizes Herlock's message was a prediction that is now coming true. Paul sees Tommy's ghost in the park, and he vanishes just as Paul discovers that Matty has disappeared. Authorities begin an search to find him, while a desperate Paul returns to the SQ office to slice his palm and bleed onto a sheet, hoping his blood will form a message that will point him to Matty. Paul finally reveals to Keel what Chad Goodwell told him about the three other witnesses to the "God is Nowhere" message, and Evelyn becomes enraged when she overhears Paul tell Keel that one of these witnesses may have taken Matty to get to him. Struggling with extreme guilt, Paul recalls a classmate in seminary who stopped his heart temporarily using drugs in an attempt to witness the afterlife during a 4-minute window where the brain remains viable. Keel enlists a medical student colleague of his to inject Paul with the drugs to stop his heart, and in a state of limbo he is able to communicate with Tommy, who gives Paul vital information on Matty's whereabouts and informs Paul he must let go of Tommy. Paul is revived, and police are able to locate Matty, having been kidnapped by a grief-stricken woman who watched her child die in front of her. A garbage truck collects the sheet Paul bled onto, which reads "God is Nowhere".

== Broadcast history ==
TV Guide ad promoting the series before its premiere.

Debuting the night after ABC's broadcast of Super Bowl XXXVII, Miracles premiered on January 27, 2003 at 10:00pm as part of the network's new "Super Monday" line-up. Despite heavy promotion of the new lineup, which also featured the new series Veritas: The Quest and a new night for hit drama The Practice, ABC finished in fourth place in the ratings that night, with the premiere of Miracles being seen by 8.74 million viewers in the United States and scoring a 3.6 rating/9 share in the advertiser-coveted adults 18–49 demographic, ABC's highest rating in the timeslot since March 2001.

Despite generally positive reviews from critics and a small loyal following, Miracles failed in the ratings, and the mismanagement of the show's timeslot was largely blamed. After three episodes aired, the series was pre-empted for several weeks, "for several different reasons", according to series creator Richard Hatem. All three Monday night dramas were pulled for the remainder of the February 2003 sweeps period after scoring season low ratings on February 10. The Miracles timeslot was filled on February 17 by a rebroadcast of the Granada Television documentary special Living with Michael Jackson, and on February 24 by a rebroadcast of the season finale of The Bachelorette.

Two more episodes aired in early March 2003 when ABC preempted their Monday lineup for another two weeks, despite promoting that The Practice and Miracles would air six straight weeks of original episodes beginning March 3; ABC's March 17 primetime lineup was devoted entirely to news coverage about the impending War in Iraq, while a second new episode of The Practice aired in the 10:00pm hour on March 24. The final broadcast episode, "Hand of God", aired on March 31, 2003, drawing five million viewers and a 1.8 rating/5 share in adults 18–49.

ABC officially cancelled the series on April 3, 2003, filling the Monday 10:00pm timeslot with reruns of The Practice for the remainder of the season. The Miracles message boards on ABC's official website were closed 24 hours later. The show placed 105th in the Nielsen ratings during its six episode run, averaging 6.53 million viewers and a 2.5 rating/6 share in adults 18–49.

The remaining seven episodes produced were never aired in the United States. Canada's VisionTV began airing the show on October 3, 2003 and aired all 13 episodes, marking the first time the latter seven episodes were broadcast on television. VisionTV later aired the entire series again on Monday nights from January through March 2004 and 2005.

About the show's failure, Skeet Ulrich said: "the frustrating part is that it did take off. It did really well. We were the show that aired after the Super Bowl [sic], and we had over 10 million viewers [sic]. And then Bush started bombing Iraq, and we were pre-empted for war coverage. And then because we lost the momentum, they shifted the day of the week it aired [sic] and didn’t tell people. It was an odd combination of why it didn’t last. But it did take off. It had a massive following and was doing well, and the stories were good. So it wasn’t anything we did or that the fans did. It wasn’t failing. It was just the timing of everything at that moment killed it. And it’s unfortunate, because I think it had a lot of story left in it— much like Jericho —but then between Desert Storm and the way networks do things, it just went away."

=== U.S. television ratings ===
Episode #	Title	Air date	18–49 rating/share	Viewers (millions)
1	"The Ferguson Syndrome"	January 27, 2003	3.6/9	8.74
2	"The Friendly Skies"	February 3, 2003	2.9/7	7.13
3	"The Patient"	February 10, 2003	2.5/6	6.32
4	"Little Miss Lost"	March 3, 2003	2.3/6	6.38
5	"The Bone Scatterer"	March 10, 2003	2.0/5	5.74
6	"Hand of God"	March 31, 2003	1.8/5	4.96

== DVD release ==
Shout! Factory (not via the Scream! Factory label) released the entire series on DVD in Region 1 on April 19, 2005. The 4-disc set features six commentary tracks, five deleted scenes, a 30-minute interview with series creator Richard Hatem, and a rough cut of a series promo.

As of 2025, the international rights to the series are currently held by Multicom Entertainment Group, however U.S. rights are still held by Disney Enterprises Inc. A remaster for the series is expected to be in the works by Multicom itself.

== Awards and nominations ==
Year	Category	Nominee(s)	Episode	Result
2003	Primetime Emmy Award for Outstanding Main Title Theme Music	W.G. Snuffy Walden, Joseph Williams	N/A	Nominated

== See also ==
- Vatican Miracle Examiner – a Japanese light-novel, manga and anime with similar elements.
- Apparitions – a British TV series about a Vatican miracle investigator.
