= Tegan the Vegan =

- Directed by: Marisa Martin
- Written by: Marisa Martin
- Produced by: Belinda Barancewicz
- Starring: Charli Robinson; Noni Hazlehurst; Paul McDermott; Pippa Black
- Release date: January 2011 (Flicker Fest)
- Country: Australia
- Language: English

Tegan the Vegan is a 2011 stop-motion animation short film directed by Marisa Martin and starring Charli Robinson (then referred to as Delaney), Noni Hazlehurst, Paul McDermott and Pippa Black. It is produced by Enemies of Reality media, based in Queanbeyan, New South Wales, and voice recording was completed in Sydney and Melbourne.

== Plot ==
The film is about Tegan, a 12-year-old student who finds out where meat comes from, and decides to become a vegetarian. She must contend with Elenore the Carnivore. The plot is based partly on the experience of the director, Marisa Martin, who became a vegetarian when she was 12 after visiting an abattoir.

== Cast ==
- Charli Robinson as Tegan the Vegan
- Noni Hazlehurst as Mrs Poodle & Tegan's Mum
- Paul McDermott as Trent, Dorian and Bryan
- Pippa Black as Elenore the Carnivore
- Belinda Barancewicz as Suki

== Production ==
The puppets were made using aluminium foil, epoxy putty, polymer clay, foam and magnets (in the feet to help them stay up). Filming the puppets was a long process, taking around a week to make six seconds of film.

== Themes ==
- vegetarianism
- young love

== See also ==
- Cinema of Australia
