= Robert Piper =

Australian development aid coordinator

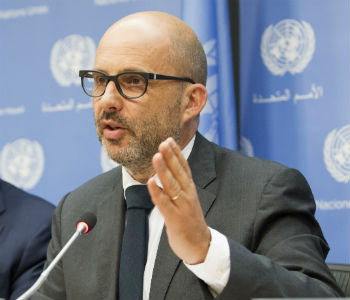
- Photo: UN/Rick Bajornas
- Born: 1966 (age 59–60); Canberra, Australia
- Employer: United Nations
- Title: Special Adviser on Solutions to Internal Displacement

Robert Andrew Piper (born 1966) is an Australian development aid coordinator for the United Nations. Between December 2018 and May 2022, he was Assistant Secretary-General of the United Nations Development Coordination Office. In May 2022, he was appointed Special Adviser to the Secretary-General on Solutions to Internal Displacement. He is currently based in Geneva.

== Early life ==
Piper was born in Canberra. Piper studied at Canberra Grammar School from 1979 to 1983 and was active in music and drama.

He then studied arts (majoring in political science) at the Australian National University. During his studies, he was an accomplished street performer, and together with friends Richard Fidler and Tim Ferguson, formed a comedy busking trio called the Doug Anthony All Stars. In 1985, Piper left the All Stars to study acting at the Cours Florent in Paris, and was replaced by Paul McDermott.

== United Nations career ==
Piper began his career in humanitarian development in 1989, joining the Australian government aid agency AusAID. In 1990, he joined the United Nations, working with the United Nations Population Fund in Thailand, then the United Nations Development Programme (UNDP) in Cambodia and Fiji. He served in several key roles at UNDP, including as a manager of its NetAid initiative in 1999. In 2002 he became Development Coordinator and Resident Representative in Kosovo.

In 2005, in the aftermath of the 2004 Indian Ocean earthquake and tsunami, Piper was asked by former US President Bill Clinton to serve as his chief of staff, in Clinton's capacity as UN Special Envoy for Tsunami Recovery.

From 2008 to 2013, Piper was Resident and Humanitarian Coordinator for Nepal. In March 2013, he replaced David Gressly as Regional Humanitarian Coordinator for the Sahel, supporting humanitarian work across the nine countries of the region (Senegal, The Gambia, Chad, Burkina Faso, Niger, Mauritania, Northern Nigeria, Northern Cameroon and Mali).

From May 2015, he was the Deputy Special Coordinator for the Middle East Peace Process and the Humanitarian Coordinator for the Occupied Palestinian Territory, with the rank of UN Assistant Secretary General.

In December 2018, Piper was appointed Assistant Secretary General of the United Nations Development Coordination Office.

In May 2022, Piper was appointed Special Adviser to the Secretary-General on Solutions to Internal Displacement.

Diplomatic posts
Preceded by David Gressly	Regional Humanitarian Coordinator for the Sahel Region; 2013–2015	Succeeded by Toby Lanzer
