= The Sideshow (TV series) =

Australian television series

- Created by: Ted Robinson
- Written by: Ian Simmons, Simon Dodd, Dave Bloustien, Bruce Griffiths, Warwick Holt, Mat Blackwell
- Directed by: Martin Coombes
- Presented by: Paul McDermott
- Starring: Paul McDermott; Claire Hooper; Flacco; The Umbilical Brothers; Tripod
- Country of origin: Australia
- Original language: English
- No. of seasons: 1
- No. of episodes: 26

Production
- Executive producers: Megan Harding – ABC TV; Ted Robinson – GNWTV
- Producer: Pam Swain
- Running time: Approximately 57 minutes

Original release
- Network: ABC TV
- Release: 21 April – 1 December 2007

The Sideshow is a one-hour Australian television comedy/variety series that was broadcast on ABC TV in 2007. The show was a mixture of stand-up comedy, sketches, live music, circus acts, cabaret and burlesque. Hosted by Paul McDermott, The Sideshow regularly featured performances and sketches by Claire Hooper, Flacco, The Umbilical Brothers, and Tripod.

The series was created by veteran director-producer Ted Robinson, produced for the ABC by Robinson's GNW company. It was similar in style to earlier Ted Robinson ABC comedy productions, notably The Big Gig, and the short-lived ABC show The 10:30 Slot, featuring "live-to-tape" performances before a studio audience, pre-recorded inserts and the use of multiple stages. The staging used elements recycled from the set of the former GNW series The Glass House.

The series began as a family-oriented variety show, airing at 7:30 pm on Saturday evenings. After 10 episodes beginning in April 2007, it took a few months off, returning in August at the later time of 9:25 pm allowed the show to move from a PG to an M rating, and to include more adult-oriented humour. Like other shows produced by GNW TV, it had a cult following, and was regularly watched by 300,000 to 400,000 viewers.

Episodes were pre-recorded before a live audience, at Studio 22 at the ABC's Ultimo studios in Sydney on Thursday nights for air on Saturdays. The series was shot in a very loose style and (like The Big Gig) it was typical for cameras and crew members to be seen in a shot. All floor cameras and the two Jimmy Jibs had oversized Christmas lights attached to them, and became part of the staging, rather than something never to be seen.

The Season 1 finale aired on 1 December 2007, and it was not renewed for a second season.

== Regular segments ==
The show opened with a "cold intro" featuring The Threatening Bears, hand puppets manipulated by The Umbilical Brothers. The sketch normally involves one bear hurting the other, or being disgusted by the other's actions. This segued into the opening credits, during which musical director Cameron Bruce (formerly of GUD) and house band "The Bearded Ladies" played the show's theme song. For a short period during the second half of 2007, Clayton Doley stood in as musical director, and the band was known as "The Sideshow Misfits". As well as the opening and closing themes, the house band played walk-on music for guests, riffs between segments, and sometimes accompany guests, musical or otherwise, as they performed.

Host Paul McDermott introduced the show with a monologue similar in format to the opening spiel of Good News Week, with jokes about recent news events. This was generally followed by a musical act, which featured guests including Evermore (Pilot episode), Thirsty Merc, Sneaky Sound System, Sarah Blasko, Kisschasy, The Cat Empire, Kate Miller-Heidke, Dappled Cities Fly, Expatriate, Kid Confucious, Something for Kate, Dog Trumpet, Tim Rogers, Clare Bowditch, Watussi, Colin Hay, Operator Please, The Hands, Butterfingers and Jimmy Barnes. Regular guests Tripod often performed in this segment.

Following the musical performance, McDermott presented a humorous list of fake apologies from well-known people who could not be on the show that night. After this monologue, he introduced the stand-up guest of the evening, among whom were Denise Scott, Tom Gleeson, Dave Hughes, Wil Anderson, Tommy Dean, Eddie Ifft, Josh Thomas, Frank Woodley, Ed Byrne, Kitty Flanagan, Danny Bhoy, Tom Rhodes, Arj Barker, Justin Hamilton, Gary Eck, Fiona O'Loughlin, Charlie Pickering and Greg Fleet.

In the next segment, McDermott introduced the special guest of the week. Occasionally, these were musical guests, such as an interview with Colin Hay from Australian band Men at Work, or a performance from Dein Perry and the Tap Dogs. Mostly, however, they were performers from the circus, burlesque, magician or cabaret industries. Featured guests included Mr. Fish, Shep Huntly, Imogen Kelly, Matt Hollywood, Space Cowboy, Bobbi, Azaria Universe, Legs on the Wall, Paul Capsis and The Wau Wau Sisters. McDermott was often involved in their skits, playing the role of the 'guinea pig'.

Comedian Flacco had a regular segment on the show, often in the role of "Private Dick" in a stand-up routine that parodies the format and visual style of film noir and pulp novels. He was occasionally joined by long-time friend Steve Abbott as "The Sandman".

Claire Hooper and Paul McDermott on The Sideshow

Comedian Claire Hooper then joined McDermott atop the bar for a humorous chat. The segment originated as a "20 questions" interview but gradually drifted away from this format, with Hooper moving into humorous story-telling—often relating to embarrassing events in her own life—and comedy routines. Hooper was normally followed by The Umbilical Brothers, who performed sketches using a combination of vocal sound effects and mime.

McDermott closed the show by predicting the major events of the week ahead in a format similar to his closing monologue on Good News Week. The show always concluded with a musical performance. Most weeks McDermott sang, sometimes backed by Tripod. Other performers included Tim Minchin, Eddie Perfect, The Kransky Sisters and Colin Hay. When the song ended McDermott, Tripod and the house band lead an "all-in" rendition of the show's theme song to accompany the closing credits, while the show's regulars and guests emerged on the balcony to sing and dance along.

After the closing credits there was a final skit from The Threatening Bears, normally involving a reference to an earlier segment of the show.

== Bumpers / Video insert segments ==
The show also regularly featured short pre-recorded video sketches that divided up the live-to-tape studio segments:

New Moods in Intelligent Design This sketch featured a voiceover from McDermott with accompanying text on screen explaining "Why God Didn't Design" some form of absurd or dysfunctional fictional animal such as the Pyjamadillo (a pyjama-wearing nocturnal armadillo). This was then followed by an animation which gave the viewer visual evidence as to why God didn't design that animal. It concluded with the words "ERGO: God is smart", although after a particularly bizarre animal, it would conclude instead with "God Is Smashed" or "God Is Stoned". This segment lightheartedly satirized the major arguments for intelligent design as opposed to natural selection, by suggesting that the animal in question doesn't exist because God knew better than to create it (rather than its inability to evolve or survive because of the creature's impracticality). This segment presumably stemmed from McDermott's well-known atheism.

The Company of Strangers Presents This sketch, written by Flacco's alter-ego Paul Livingston, was typically a short animation with a cleverly punned subtitle. The animation often involved a sad, lonely individual performing a menial task.

The Threatening Bears In addition to their regular spots at the beginning and end of the show, the Threatening Bears and the comparatively innocent Koala appeared a number of times throughout. They often recreated stunts or segments from the show. Sometimes each sketch within an episode depicted the bears' various attempts at doing something, as opposed to the sketches where the bears didn't attempt to do anything.

The Umbilical Brothers In addition to their in-person appearances, a pre-recorded sketch involving visual humour was shot against a plain white background and appeared in most episodes, recalling the anarchic "blackout" sketches performed by The Lager Boys (a.k.a. The Empty Pockets) on The Big Gig. These were generally no longer than twenty or thirty seconds, and had a very simple storyline.
