= DAAS Kapital =

- DAAS Kapital title screen (Season 1)
- Genre: Sitcom
- Created by: Doug Anthony All Stars
- Directed by: Joe Murray; Ted Robinson
- Starring: Paul McDermott; Tim Ferguson; Richard Fidler; Paul Livingston; Michael Petroni; Mark Trevorrow; Khym Lam
- Country of origin: Australia
- Original language: English
- No. of seasons: 2
- No. of episodes: 14

Production
- Executive producer: Ted Robinson
- Running time: 30 minutes

Original release
- Network: ABC
- Release: 15 July 1991 – 7 July 1992

Related
- The Big Gig

DAAS Kapital is an Australian television comedy series written by and starring comedy trio the Doug Anthony All Stars (Paul McDermott, Tim Ferguson and Richard Fidler) with supporting cast members Paul Livingston, Michael Petroni, Bob Downe and Khym Lam. The title is a reference to the trio's acronym "DAAS" and Karl Marx's economic treatise Das Kapital.

The series premiered on 15 July 1991, in Australia on the ABC network, and the season finale aired 7 July 1992. DAAS Kapital aired in 18 countries including Japan, Britain, USA and Germany and was released on DVD 20 March 2013 with commentary by the All Stars and a new, original song. On 13 April 2013, the All Stars reunited for a one-off show celebrating the launch of the DVD set.

== Format ==
DAAS Kapital was a sitcom that incorporated sketch show and variety show TV formats. For example, in each scripted episode, there would be cutaways to television shows and commercials—typically Shitsu Tonka News, Troy The Invincible and Wayne Kerr—along with guest appearances by Paul Livingston, Bob, Bob Downe and stop-motion animation sequences, along with original songs performed by the Doug Anthony All Stars. Ferguson described the show as "a cross between Land of Giants, Marine Boy and Jacques Cousteau on speed." Each episode's plot usually consisted of a very simple idea, such as a bug infestation on board or a Cinderella-style story mixed with all the above segments strung together with very quick jokes, narrative humour and stories told by the All Stars.

Dear Jocasta, Today is Bastille Day. Now, Mother, before you go on about it, I know that you think the French are absolutely awful people after they bought Greenpeace and turned it into a dolphin canning factory. Richard has convinced me that testing cosmetics on animals is wrong. Therefore please send me only those facial creams tested on the naked skin of refugee babies. Paul's constantly staggering about the place and throwing up everywhere. He says it's the rough seas. I'm not sure. I'm reading War and Peace but I don't know what its about. I was pleased to hear that cousin Valmay's new ears work. Pity falling pianos don't make any noise.

— Tim Ferguson, "Sloth"

== Characters and casting ==
In addition to Tim, Paul and Richard, numerous other recurring characters appeared throughout the series. These included:

- Flacco (Paul Livingston): a strange alien being with a high-pitched voice. He spends most of his time talking to his pet (animated) cockroach, Ross. Livingston also portrays several other characters throughout the series, such as the Marquis de Sade and the Pope, although the other characters have Flacco's mannerisms.
- Psycho Bob (Michael Petroni): an American serial killer and psychotic who has somehow stowed away on board. He usually has a ranting monologue to camera ending with his catchphrase: "I'm Bob, and I'll be back." Tim is the only member of the crew to have seen or encountered him, implying that he is a figment of Tim's subconscious.
- Thulgore (animated): a giant monster (said to be a crab louse, but with anthropomorphic face and limbs) who lives in the engine room.
- The Shitsu Tonka newsreader (Khym Lam): the boys' only contact with the outside world is broadcasts from Shitsu Tonka's television network, including regular bulletins from a female Asian newsreader.
- Bob Downe (Mark Trevorrow): a cheesy cabaret singer who is a TV personality on Shitsu Tonka.
- Wayne Kerr (Tim Ferguson): along with his sidekick pals, Spinner (Richard Fidler) and Paddlefoot (Paul McDermott), are characters in the most violent program on Shitsu Tonka ("with a G-5 violence rating!").
- Troy the Invincible (Paul McDermott): appears on Shitsu Tonka. Performs acts of violence on himself to demonstrate the invincibility of his working-class principles.
- Uncle Biff Happy (Richard Fidler): a used car salesman whose ads appear on Shitsu Tonka.

== Scenario ==
By the year 1998, the Shitsu Tonka Unitocracy has taken over the world. "Competition between nations has been made redundant by the universal 'Common Cents' currency and rezoning and decentralisation of much of the world's population. By homogenising the various races of the world, the petty nationalism that has plagued civilisation since the Dawn of Man has been diffused ... all [minorities] are allowed to flourish in the macrosociety we have imposed."

The show itself takes place in the year 2006 as the All Stars (Tim Ferguson, Paul McDermott and Richard Fidler) are placed in a submarine with all the world's artwork and treasures and their "assignment is to catalogue history." Some time later they become lost, their whereabouts unknown and their existence is denied by the Shitsu Tonka Corp.

In the final episode of season 1, it becomes apparent that Shitsu Tonka deliberately sabotaged the ship, placing Richard on board as a robot implanted with a bomb. He was to self-destruct and completely destroy history. Instead, the blast propelled the submarine into space, providing an opportunity for more sci-fi based storylines and parodies in the show's second season. In the final episode of this season, the ship returns to the ocean.

== Episodes ==
=== Season 1 (1991) ===
All episodes are named after the seven deadly sins.

The episodes listed in the Season 1 scriptbook are in this order: Avarice, Sloth, Gluttony, Pride, Envy, Lust, Anger. Episodes in broadcast order below.

No. overall	No. in season	Title	Directed by	Written by	Songs
1	1	"Lust"	Joe Murray and Ted Robinson	Tim Ferguson, Richard Fidler, Paul McDermott with Paul Livingston, Michael Petroni, Mark Trevorrow	Catholic Girls on LSD (partial), Living With Girls
Tim and Paul are to attend the Rhino Ball, but alas Richard will be stuck at home cleaning... that is until his fairy godfish offers him a little help.
2	2	"Avarice"	Joe Murray and Ted Robinson	Tim Ferguson, Richard Fidler, Paul McDermott with Paul Livingston, Michael Petroni, Mark Trevorrow	Mummy Dearest
It's Paul's birthday, but it looks as though everyone's forgotten.
3	3	"Gluttony"	Joe Murray and Ted Robinson	Tim Ferguson, Richard Fidler, Paul McDermott with Paul Livingston, Michael Petroni, Mark Trevorrow	Sunday Mornings*, Big Dirty Mongrel
It's Sunday, and everyone is bored... that is, until they decide to play a few games to fill in the time.
4	4	"Envy"	Joe Murray and Ted Robinson	Tim Ferguson, Richard Fidler, Paul McDermott with Paul Livingston, Michael Petroni, Mark Trevorrow	Maria, Catholic Girls On LSD
After a scout jamboree, each of the boys must go through their own personal journey of self exploration. Richard must overcome his demons to gain courage, Tim must find a brain, and surely Paul has a heart somewhere inside him?
5	5	"Sloth"	Joe Murray and Ted Robinson	Tim Ferguson, Richard Fidler, Paul McDermott with Paul Livingston, Michael Petroni, Mark Trevorrow	I Love The French, Mexican Hitler
It's Bastille Day on the Titanic II, and Tim and Richard finally decide to do something about Paul's alcoholism.
6	6	"Pride"	Joe Murray and Ted Robinson	Tim Ferguson, Richard Fidler, Paul McDermott with Paul Livingston, Michael Petroni, Mark Trevorrow	Happy Endings
The ship is infested with cockroaches and Paul sets out on a quest to fix the problem... However the Ferguson family curse starts to catch up with Tim as he slowly morphs into a cockroach himself.
7	7	"Anger"	Joe Murray and Ted Robinson	Tim Ferguson, Richard Fidler, Paul McDermott with Paul Livingston, Michael Petroni, Mark Trevorrow	Cosmic Cowboys of Doom, Three Steps to Heaven
It's the last day on board the Titanic II, however there is a problem... one of the boys is a robot set to self-destruct before they can leave.

* "Gluttony" opens with the All Stars performing a cover of The Velvet Underground's "Sunday Morning." On the 2013 DAAS Kapital DVD, the song is omitted due to "contractual reasons... and because we never paid to use it in the first place," according to Paul McDermott. In its place is the song "Saturday (mourning)," also known as Saturday's The Day For Leaving," written and recorded exclusively for the DVD release. During the song, the DVD displays text to this effect, before mentioning the All Stars' performance of Sunday Morning "is still on YouTube".

=== Season 2 (1992) ===
All episodes are named after the seven heavenly virtues.

No. overall	No. in season	Title	Directed by	Written by	Songs
8	1	"Faith"	Joe Murray and Ted Robinson	Paul McDermott, Tim Ferguson, Richard Fidler, Paul Livingston, Michael Petroni, Mark Trevorrow	I'm Sick
Now drifting through space, the boys must fill out an official census. Meanwhile, Tim has decided to run for Shitzu Tonka World Leader.
9	2	"Humility"	Joe Murray and Ted Robinson	Paul McDermott, Tim Ferguson, Richard Fidler, Paul Livingston, Michael Petroni, Mark Trevorrow	That's Jazz, Warsong
Earth has declared open season on jazz musicians, so the Marquis de Sade travels to space to avoid being killed. The boys decide to use their collection of jazz records to get back to Earth.
10	3	"Felicity"	Joe Murray and Ted Robinson	Paul McDermott, Tim Ferguson, Richard Fidler, Paul Livingston, Michael Petroni, Mark Trevorrow	I'm A Psycho Killer, Bless Me Father
After the boys discover a miracle, the new Pope pays them a visit, while Tim and Richard prepare for the corruption of the Brain of St Peter.
11	4	"Chastity"	Joe Murray and Ted Robinson	Paul McDermott, Tim Ferguson, Richard Fidler, Paul Livingston, Michael Petroni, Mark Trevorrow	Carnal Carnival
When the Titanic II is confronted by a UFO, they discover that Paul is, in fact, an alien. Another alien asks him to help complete experiments on Tim and Richard, but can Paul go through with it?
12	5	"Charity"	Joe Murray and Ted Robinson	Paul McDermott, Tim Ferguson, Richard Fidler, Paul Livingston, Michael Petroni, Mark Trevorrow	Away In The Manger, Good Night Sweet Prince
A mysterious 'comet' flies over the Titanic II on Christmas, leading the boys to find a baby in a manger.
13	6	"Hope"	Joe Murray and Ted Robinson	Paul McDermott, Tim Ferguson, Richard Fidler, Paul Livingston, Michael Petroni, Mark Trevorrow	Party In Hell
A planned picnic on Friday the 13th results in the boys hopelessly lost, confronting gremlins, a witch and a prince.
14	7	"Patience"	Joe Murray and Ted Robinson	Paul McDermott, Tim Ferguson, Richard Fidler, Paul Livingston, Michael Petroni, Mark Trevorrow	Drugs
The boys discover they have ten hours until they are to be hit by a meteor shower. With the engine out of commission, they also must cope with a strange visitor.

== Home media ==
=== Scriptbook ===
In 1992, the scripts for the first season of DAAS Kapital were collected into a book which also contained on-set photographs of the production and illustrations by the All Stars.

=== DVD ===
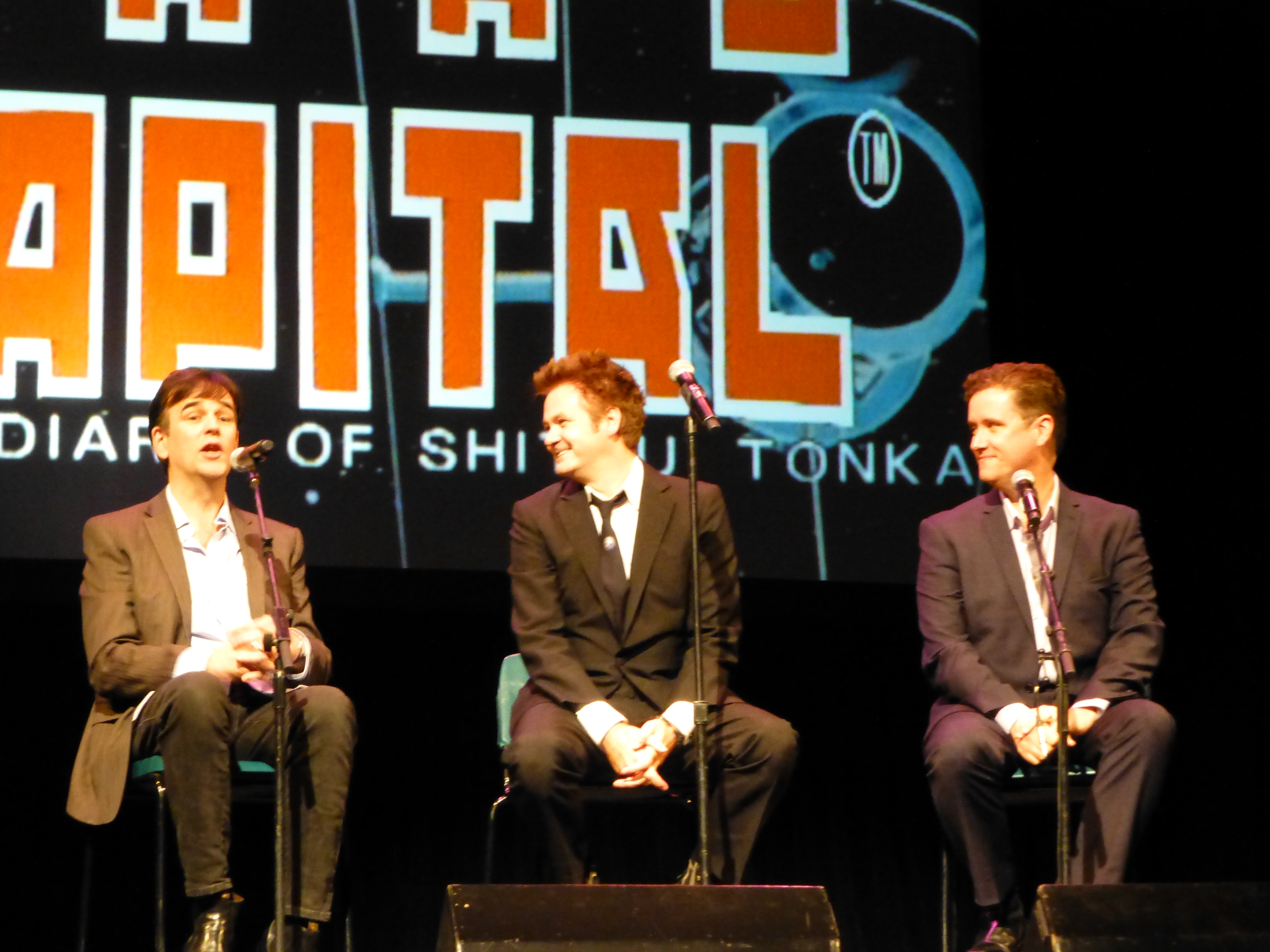
DAAS reunited for a one-off show to launch the DVD release of DAAS Kapital, 13 April 2013

On 1 November 2012, Tim Ferguson announced via Twitter that a DAAS Kapital DVD was underway and would be released in 2013. Ferguson then tweeted that the set would include audio commentary followed by a picture of the recording session, one of the DAAS Kapital crew as they are today and revealing that a new, original song was being recorded for the DVD set.

The DVD was confirmed for release on 20 March 2013, with the group reforming for the official launch of the DVD set on 13 April. After lengthy discussion on the DVD set itself, the show and guests Flacco, Khym Lam and producer/co-director Ted Robinson, DAAS performed three songs: "My Girl" (the first song they performed together as a group), "Warsong" from DAAS Kapital and the last song the group recorded, the DVD exclusive "Saturday's The Day For Leaving."
