= GUD (band) =

Australian musical comedy group

Comedy career
- Years active: 2002-present
- Genre: Musical comedy
- Members: Paul McDermott; Mick Moriarty; Cameron Bruce

GUD is an Australian comedic music-based trio composed of Paul McDermott, previously of the Doug Anthony All Stars, former Gadflys guitarist Mick Moriarty, and Club Luna Band keyboard player Cameron Bruce. According to McDermott, the group is named GUD in mockery of the way American people pronounce the word "god", "because that's who Americans thank at awards ceremonies, and I thought someone should be taking the credit." The group has performed at both the Edinburgh Festival Fringe and the Melbourne International Comedy Festival; at the latter, their 2003 show "GUD Ugh" won The Age Critic's Choice Award for best show of the festival. They appeared at the Montreal Comedy Festival in a special showcasing of comedy from Australia.

The group uses topical humour in its music; their act includes songs about Osama bin Laden, the transportation of live animal stock and what they describe as contemporary Australian "folk heroes" such as gangland hitman Chopper Read, jailed stockbroker Rene Rivkin and convicted serial killer Ivan Milat. McDermott says that GUD is in a similar vein to the Doug Anthony All Stars, of which he was formerly a member, in that it revolves around music, comedy and the inter-relationships between the band members onstage. Moriarty plays the role of a laconic drug user while Bruce is cast as the brash pornographer who inserts lewd sexual references whenever he sees the opportunity. McDermott is the front man, performing some stand-up in addition to singing.

== Gud Ugh ==
Gud Ugh was a musical comedy show performed by GUD in 2003 at the Melbourne International Comedy Festival and on tour. It won The Age Critic's Choice Award for Best Show of the Festival.
