= Doug Anthony All Stars =

Australian musical comedy trio

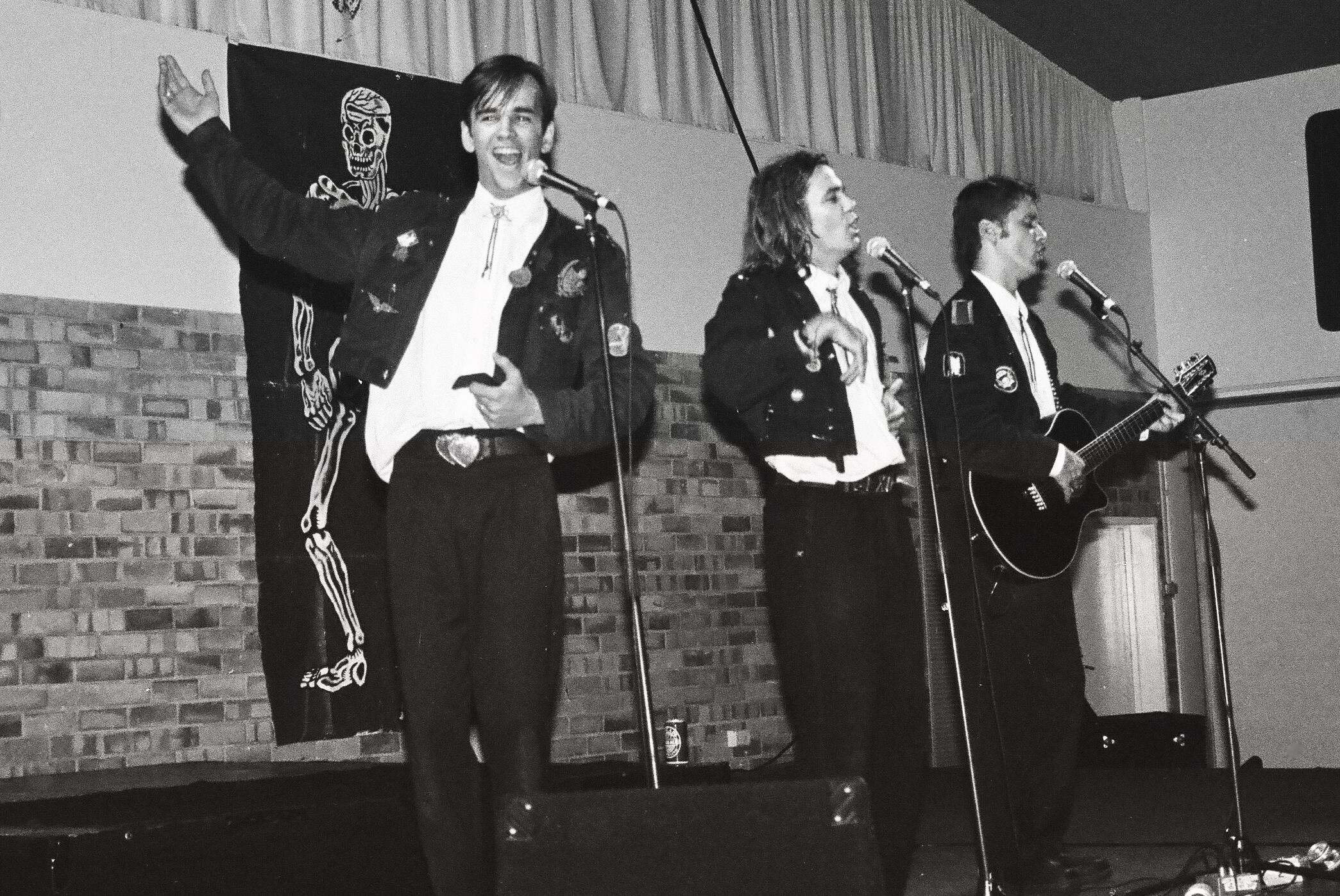
- Tim Ferguson, Paul McDermott and Richard Fidler performing in Hobart, Tasmania, 1994

Background information
- Also known as: DAAS
- Origin: Canberra
- Genres: Alternative rock, comedy rock
- Years active: 1984–1994, 2013–2017 (one-off reunions in 2003 and 2023)
- Members: Paul McDermott; Tim Ferguson; Paul "Flacco" Livingston
- Past members: Richard Fidler; Robert Piper

The Doug Anthony All Stars (or Doug Anthony Allstars, DAAS, D.A.A.S. or stylised as D⋆A†A☭S) were an Australian musical comedy group who initially performed together between 1984 and 1994. The group were an acoustic trio, originally comprising Robert Piper and Tim Ferguson on main vocals and Richard Fidler on guitar and backing vocals. In 1985, Piper left the All Stars to study acting at the Cours Florent in Paris, and was replaced by Paul McDermott. The group reformed in 2014, with Paul Livingston (aka "Flacco") replacing Fidler on guitar.

DAAS were known for their aggressive, provocative style, their habit of involving audience members and their tendency to attack topical and sometimes controversial issues in their comedy.

DAAS began performing as buskers on the streets of Canberra in 1984, while they were attending university. After winning the Pick of the Fringe award at the 1986 Adelaide Fringe Festival, the group relocated from Canberra to Melbourne. After performing at Edinburgh Festival Fringe in 1987 they gained popularity in the United Kingdom, where they made numerous television appearances and performed several times on the UK's Channel 4 late-night alternative comedy show Viva Cabaret. In 1989 they were made regular performers on the Australian comedy show The Big Gig. They remained a popular feature of the show until 1991 when they left to create their own ABC comedy series, DAAS Kapital.

The group released four live recordings and one studio album, DAAS Icon, which was briefly banned in Britain and achieved some independent success in Australia. They also released a collection of dark short stories in 1989, titled Book, which took a markedly different tone from their comedic stage performances. They also made two live concert videos and one film, The Edinburgh Years. The group split up in 1994, following a final farewell tour of Australia. Although they reunited in 2003 to perform together at a benefit concert, were interviewed together in 2008 in support of their DVD, and reunited for a one-off show to launch the DAAS Kapital DVD in 2013, the three ruled out the suggestion of a reunion tour at the time.

After an hiatus, McDermott, Ferguson and Paul Livingston (performing the role of Fidler) performed "as DAAS" for their 30th anniversary at the Canberra Comedy Festival, held in March 2014.

The group have been inactive since the end of 2017.

== Style ==
DAAS frequently involved the audience in their act. In this scene, the group mock-threaten to shoot an audience member.

DAAS employ an aggressive, confrontational style, which author and journalist Geoff Bartlett describes as "[pushing] the boundaries of humour and good taste to their absolute limits". They frequently delve into topical and taboo subject matter with songs such as "Commies for Christ" and "I Fuck Dogs". "Long before anyone knew the term, one of our greatest driving forces was to be politically incorrect," said Ferguson. Each band member developed distinctive onstage characters, with McDermott adopting a nasty, mean persona, while Ferguson played a narcissistic character who was "gorgeous but stupid". Fidler initially played the straight man, but as the group became more aggressive he developed into a character who was naturally happy and caring but frequently victimised by his fellow band members.

The group drew inspiration from short-lived punk bands like the Fat Sluts, The Lone Reagans and Forbidden Mule, whom Ferguson describes as "like all punk bands... very fast and furious." Much of the band's provocative style emerged from their origins as street performers, where to get people's attention they resorted to outrageous or theatrical tactics—the group would sometimes walk into the street and stop traffic to get noticed. "Sometimes we have to do really ugly or horrendous things to get people's attention, and we're not afraid to do that. We'll hit someone if it gets a bit of discourse going," said McDermott.

Neil Pigot, who did some work with the group, describes their style as "a sort of extension of the Python tradition, but very much in an Australian context." He says that DAAS were "crucially important" in the development of Australian comedy, directly contributing to the styles of successful comedy shows such as The D-Generation, Fast Forward and Wogs Out of Work. At the time DAAS emerged, Pigot says, comedy in Australia was dominated by joke-tellers and impersonators. By contrast, DAAS were belligerent and confrontational, frequently attacking topical issues, invading people's personal space and involving the audience in their act. Mark Trevorrow, who frequently collaborated with the group, described their work as "true genius." "Their great shows were among the greatest evenings I've witnessed in my life and their worst shows were among the worst," he said. "They'd whip up an audience and appeal to people's darker side. It was very Dada, what they were doing. And what happens with that is you're just as often likely to have people who want to kill you as applaud you." In addition, ABC comedy producer Ted Robinson says that the group played an important role in raising the profile of Australian comedy overseas, particularly in Britain where DAAS were very popular. British comedian Al Murray said of seeing the group at the Edinburgh Festival in 1988, "they came onstage with the attitude of feral invaders and left it with no taboo untouched." Murray described the All Stars as "an insanely hot act from Oz who sang, cursed, sweated and insulted each other and their audiences with a level of commitment and polish that seemed exotically charged and almost transgressive in the late 80s."

I think there was true genius at work with that pack ... They'd whip up an audience and appeal to people's darker side. It was very Dada, what they were doing.

— Mark Trevorrow, Comedians in the Mist

DAAS were known for continuing to act, or to remain in character, during interviews. Much of this was just banter, but they also had serious messages. DAAS were often criticising the media and part of this was to tell outrageous lies to journalists during interviews and attempt to see them published as fact. In one of the best-known instances of this, the group told British reporters that their namesake, former Australian politician Doug Anthony, was a much-loved Prime Minister of Australia who had been assassinated on 11 November 1975, by right-wing extremists. (In fact, Anthony is a former Deputy Prime Minister of Australia who had led the right-of-center National Party of Australia from 1971 to 1984.) The lie was printed in The Times, The Guardian and The Independent. This game continued undetected until in 1990 the group told a reporter that they had been cast in Batman and had become great friends with Jack Nicholson, both lies. The story was reported as fact in newspapers around Australia and appeared as a cover story in the TV guide of Melbourne's Herald Sun before the media realised the hoax.

== History ==
=== Early years ===
Tim Ferguson met Richard Fidler busking on the streets of Canberra in 1984, while they were both attending university. Ferguson recalls: "Richard was playing the guitar—something from Cat Stevens—one day and I walked up to him and we did 'Wild Thing'. I sang a few lyrics and jumped about like a mad thing. Lo and behold we made a stack of money in ten minutes." The two began performing together and joined with another friend, Robert Piper, to form the Doug Anthony All Stars. They derived their name from Doug Anthony, a former Country Party leader and Deputy Prime Minister of Australia. According to Fidler, during their earlier gigs in clubs and as street performers, Ferguson was "a bit of an explosive hippie" while Fidler and Piper were more reserved. Robert Piper left the group in 1985 due to other commitments. Piper has gone on to a successful career with the United Nations and in March 2013 was named Deputy Special Coordinator for the Middle East Peace Process and the humanitarian coordinator for the Occupied Palestinian Territory.

With Piper's departure, Paul McDermott, who performed at one of DAAS's regular clubs, was invited to join. He accepted, although he did not like their material, which he considered too sweet. Fidler says McDermott changed the group's dynamic; he wrote the majority of their songs and prompted a darker tone. After winning the Pick of the Fringe award at the 1986 Adelaide Fringe Festival, the group relocated from Canberra to Melbourne, where they based themselves with a regular gig at the Prince Patrick Hotel in Collingwood, in an effort to save enough money to travel to the Edinburgh Fringe. Initially, DAAS found that Melbourne audiences did not respond to their act and to provoke a reaction they became more aggressive, with McDermott and Ferguson adopting more abusive personas and often picking on Fidler's naturally happy but stupid character. They made their first overseas performance at the Edinburgh Fringe in 1987, to sold-out crowds.

=== Successes ===
It was weird for us to go from performing ... to an audience of roughly 15 million people in one night, to then go back to Australia and have to busk in Swanston Street mall.

— Paul McDermott, Comedians in the Mist

Following their Edinburgh Fringe shows, the group enjoyed considerable success in the United Kingdom, making appearances on numerous BBC comedy shows. In 1988, the group was nominated for the Perrier Comedy Award for their performances at the Edinburgh Festival Fringe. Fidler says that the British people were more receptive to their act at the time than Australians had been. "The whole thing exploded for us when we got there, it was quite incredible. Within a very short time we were doing national television appearances in front of millions of people and playing these enormous shows," he says. They played extensively in Canada, Germany, America and Britain, and finished their time in Britain by appearing on the final episode of the successful Friday Night Live. However, despite the acclaim they were receiving overseas, when they returned to Australia at the end of 1988 they remained unknown. Upon arriving in Melbourne, they struggled to gain a following and went back to busking on the streets.

DAAS in an appearance on The Big Gig

This changed in 1989 when ABC comedy producer Ted Robinson invited them to appear on a new comedy show, The Big Gig. They became a popular feature on the series and appeared in every episode until 1991. In 1989, the group also released a book titled Book, which was a collection of dark short stories. Many of the stories had been written several years prior, even before the three had started performing together, and adopted a markedly different tone to their comedic, largely ad libbed live shows. Ferguson said that they had wanted to write something that people could read and enjoy without having seen DAAS perform. Book sold 30,000 copies in England within the first two weeks of publication before being banned when DAAS refused to release an edited version of the book or permit a warning sticker on the cover. The issue was taken to court in the same year, where the ban was overturned.

DAAS released their first official album, DAAS Icon (1990). Two of the featured songs, "I Want to Spill the Blood of a Hippy" and "Bottle", were also released as singles. Icon went on to become the highest selling independent album in Australia, but was banned in the United Kingdom due to a reference to the IRA in the song "KRSNA". This was later overturned by a British court. The group continued to appear weekly on The Big Gig until 1991 when their own series, DAAS Kapital, premiered on the ABC. A futuristic half-hour-long sitcom about the band's adventures in an underwater history museum, DAAS Kapital ran for two seven-episode seasons between 1991 and 1992 despite a poor critical reaction. From 1992, they became UK-based, returning to Australia for a short time in 1993 to promote Dead & Alive, a live recording of one of their London shows which was released on CD and VHS. They played at the opening of the 1992 Barcelona Olympics and appeared regularly on Britain's Channel 4 variety show Viva Cabaret.

The reformed group returned to tour the United Kingdom in 2016, and won the Spirit of the Fringe Award at the Edinburgh Fringe Festival. Their show at the Pleasance in Edinburgh was chosen by Steve Bennett, editor of Chortle.co.uk, as the second most memorable comedy gig of 2016.

=== Break-up and reformation ===
It was incredibly difficult [to leave] because I loved it. And also I loved, and still do, the boys.

— Tim Ferguson, Weekly Review interview

The group held a final farewell tour of Australia in 1994, which was recorded and released on CD by ABC Records as DAAS: The Last Concert. The break-up sparked rumours of a falling out among the trio, although all three denied this, stating that it was simply time to move on. Richard Fidler described it as a matter of practicality: Ferguson wanted to return to Australia to be closer to his young family, while McDermott and Fidler wished to continue working in Britain as they felt they had done everything they had wanted to do in Australia.

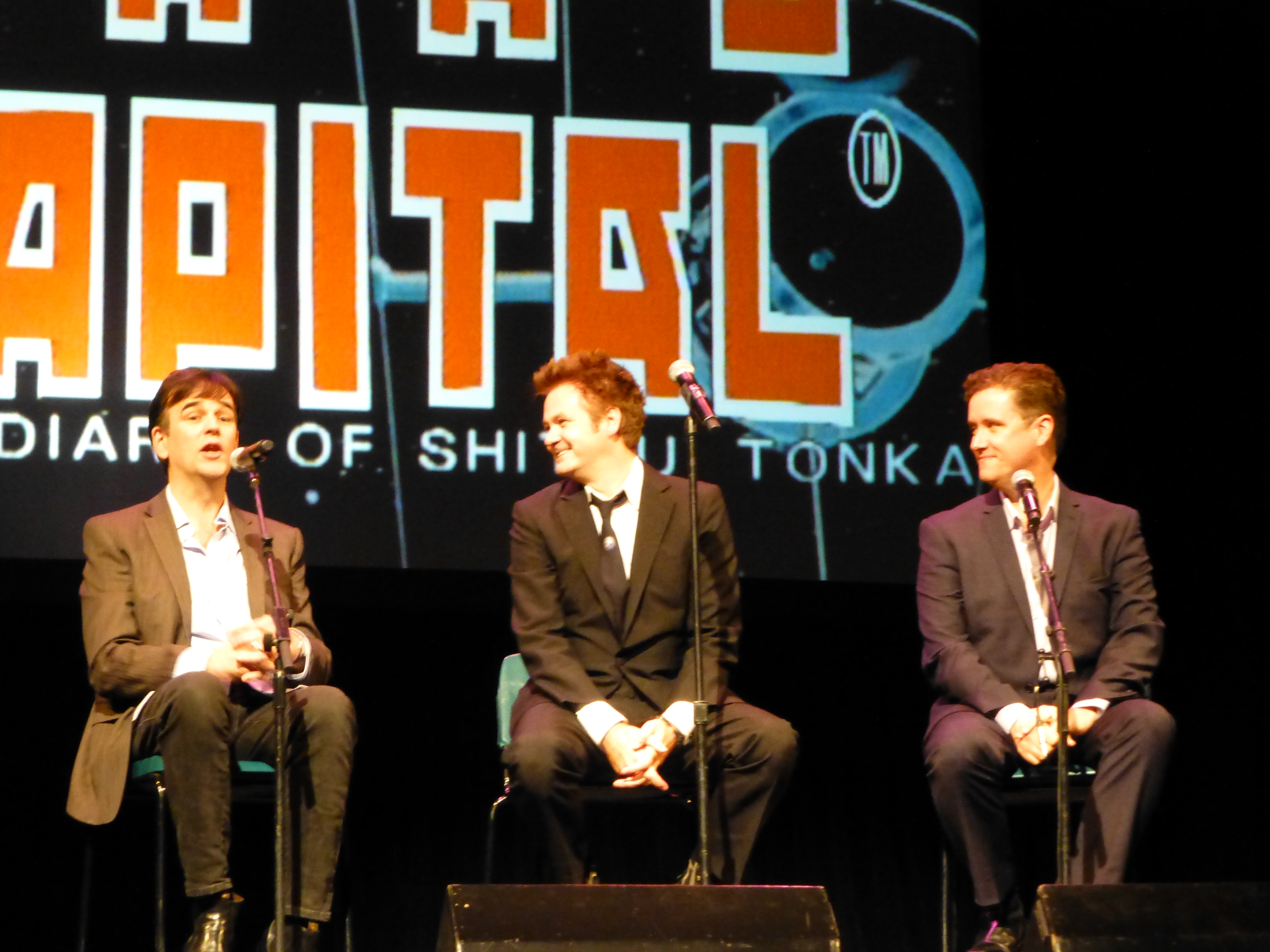
DAAS reunited for a one-off show to launch the DVD release of DAAS Kapital, 13 April 2013

In June 2010, Tim Ferguson revealed that the break-up was due in large part to personal health issues. Unknown to the public at the time, Ferguson had been diagnosed with multiple sclerosis in 1996 after experiencing symptoms for several years including a few severe episodes while touring in 1993. The symptoms affected his mobility, causing him to struggle with choreography and physical routines onstage and eventually, he says, "it was clear I couldn't remain a Doug Anthony Allstar with whatever this was". Still coming to terms with his diagnosis, Ferguson chose to keep it private, telling few people outside of his close friends and family. "I didn't want other people to know," he says. "I didn't want it to be coming up in conversation with strangers."

In July 2003, DAAS reunited for the first time since their break-up to perform at a special gala comedy event called "For Holly". Dedicated to the memory of Holly Robinson—a casting director for Home and Away and the daughter of The Big Gig's Ted Robinson—who had died of cancer the month before, the concert was a fundraising benefit for research into the disease. At Holly's request, the three also performed the Hunters & Collectors' "Throw Your Arms Around Me", a song they had frequently covered in the group's later years, at her funeral.

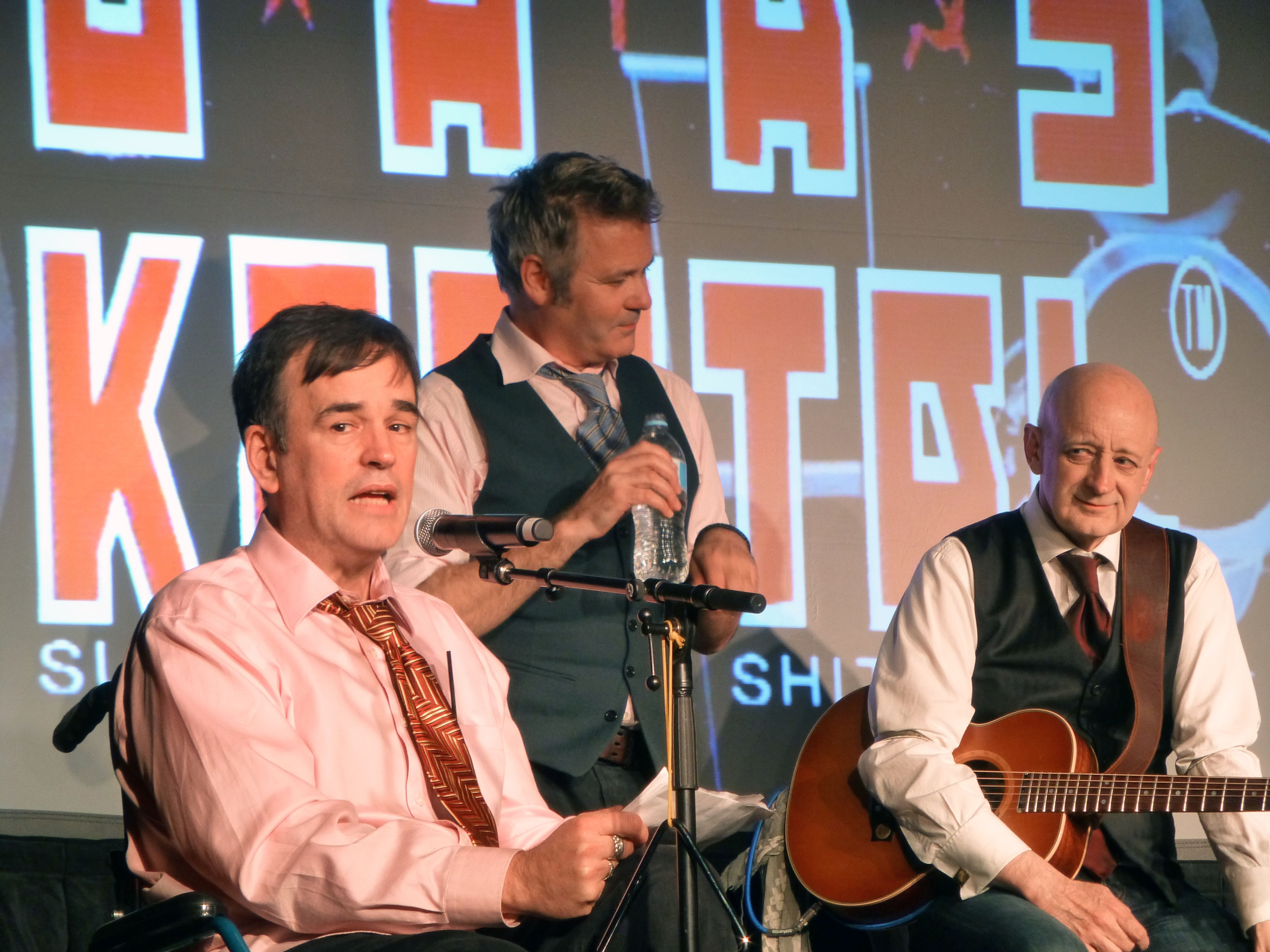
DAAS performing in 2014 with Paul Livingston replacing Richard Fidler

A DAAS DVD titled The Unlimited Uncollectible Sterling Deluxe Edition, a 2-disc collection of their performances from the first two seasons of The Big Gig, was released on 6 November 2008. Ferguson, Fidler and McDermott recorded a commentary track for the DVD and made several media appearances together to promote its release, but the three ruled out the prospect of a reunion tour. "We certainly catch up for barbecues, but not as a comedy group," McDermott said.

DAAS reunited for a one-off show to launch the DVD of the television series DAAS Kapital on 13 April 2013 as part of the Melbourne International Comedy Festival.

After an hiatus, McDermott, Ferguson and Paul Livingston (performing the role of Fidler) performed "as DAAS" for their 30th anniversary at the Canberra Comedy Festival, held in March 2014. They eventually embarked on several tours of Australia and the United Kingdom.

Although Fidler had been advocating for the group to reform for years, his work commitments with ABC Radio prevented him from participating and Livingston again filled his place as the group's guitarist.

In 2016, Livingston wrote a memoir titled D.A.A.S.: Their Part in My Downfall, which chronicled his association with the group in the 1980s and 1990s as a support act and collaborator, and then as a member of the reformed group.

On 2 and 9 October 2018, the ABC screened Tick Fucking Tock, a two-part documentary about the Doug Anthony All Stars covering their formation, history, breakup and reformation.

=== Subsequent work ===
Paul McDermott hosting an episode of Good News Week during its initial Network Ten run (1999–2000) after shifting from the ABC

Initially, McDermott was not interested in further pursuing comedy, which he came to regard as an "aberration". However, in 1996, he returned to television after being recruited by Ted Robinson to host the satirical news-based quiz show Good News Week. McDermott hosted the show until its cancellation in 2000 and returned to this role when the series was renewed in 2008. He reunited with Robinson again in 2007 when he was named host of a new ABC variety program, The Sideshow, a show described as a successor to The Big Gig. Although it quickly built a strong cult audience, the show did not rate well and was cancelled after its initial run of 26 episodes.

In addition to his television work, McDermott has continued to be involved in live comedy. He has frequently participated in the Melbourne International Comedy Festival, having often captained one of the two competing teams in the festival's Great Debate since his first debate appearance in 1994. At the 2002 festival he not only presented a solo comedy show titled "Comedyoscopy", but also performed with Cameron Bruce and Mick Moriarty in a music-based comedy trio called GUD. McDermott described GUD as being in a similar vein to DAAS in that it revolved around music, comedy and the inter-relationships between the band members onstage. As of 2018, McDermott is host of ABC quiz show Think Tank.

In 1996, Ferguson hosted the Nine Network's comedy game show Don't Forget Your Toothbrush, and after the show's cancellation Nine kept him on to develop new television pilots. However, the network was not sure how best to use his talents, and Ferguson left to pursue other work. During this time, he wrote his first novel, Left, Right and Centre: A Tale of Greed, Sex and Power, a political satire. His subsequent television credits have included Unreal TV, Big Brother, Funky Squad and Shock Jock, a 2001 cable sitcom which he also wrote and produced. He has also built a strong career as a corporate event performer and was a sessional lecturer at RMIT University, where he taught narrative comedy for the Professional Screenwriting Advanced Diploma. In 2010, he released a guide to comedy writing, The Cheeky Monkey: Writing Narrative Comedy. In 2010, Ferguson hosted and co-produced WTF – With Tim Ferguson, a comedy chat show on community television station C31 Melbourne.

In 2015, Ferguson co-wrote and co-directed the feature film Spin Out, which was released by Sony Pictures in 2016. He has co-written and produced a performance piece for orchestras, Billie and the Dinosaurs, which will debut in early 2018 at the Music for Canberra community school of which he is a patron.

After leaving DAAS, Fidler became involved in computers and multimedia. In 1996, he wrote the award-winning CD-ROM Real Wild Child, a history of Australian rock and roll. Fidler also wrote a monthly column for internet.au magazine on the digital media world, and to the Australian Constitutional Convention website . He has hosted various TV shows since 1996, including Race Around the World, Aftershock, Mouthing Off and Vulture; and spent three years in management as an editor of ABC-TV comedy before deciding he "wasn't cut out to be a manager". In 2005, Fidler ventured into radio, the 7–10pm shift on ABC Local Radio station 612 ABC Brisbane. Since 2006, he has hosted the 11 am–3pm shift on 612 ABC Brisbane, with the show's first hour—known as The Conversation Hour—also broadcast on 702 ABC Sydney. He currently co-hosts Conversations (of which he was the founding host) on ABC radio (including Radio National). In 2011, Fidler co-wrote a satirical book on Australian politics titled, Jack the Insider: The Insider's Guide to Power in Australia, released by Random House Books, New Zealand.

Original and founding member Robert Piper entered into a career with the United Nations, serving in Cambodia, New York, Serbia, and other countries, and later worked for the Clinton Administration.

== Members ==
Current members

- Tim Ferguson – vocals (1984–1994, 2014–2017)
- Paul McDermott – vocals (1985–1994, 2014–2017)
- Paul Livingston – guitar (2014–2017)

Past members

- Richard Fidler – guitar, vocals (1984–1994)
- Robert Piper – vocals (1984)

== Discography ==
- DAAS Icon (1990)
- Dead & Alive (1993)
- DAAS Bootleg – Live in Edinburgh (1994)
- The Last Concert (1995)

== Awards and nominations ==
=== ARIA Music Awards ===
The ARIA Music Awards is an annual awards ceremony that recognises excellence, innovation, and achievement across all genres of Australian music. They commenced in 1987.

Year	Nominee / work	Award	Result	Ref.
1991	Icon	Best New Talent	Nominated	
1991	Icon	Best Comedy Release	Nominated	
