= The Big Gig =

Australian comedy television program

- Also known as: Tuesday Night Live: The Big Gig
- Starring: Wendy Harmer, Glynn Nicholas, Jean Kittson, Doug Anthony All-Stars, Anthony Ackroyd
- Country of origin: Australia
- No. of episodes: 63 (plus 3 specials)

Original release
- Network: ABC TV
- Release: 28 February 1989 – 14 July 1992

Related
- DAAS Kapital

The Big Gig was a popular Australian television sketch comedy music/variety series based on the British TV series Saturday Live. It was produced and broadcast on ABC TV in the late 1980s and early 1990s and was produced and directed by Ted Robinson, who started his career as the director of the second series of the acclaimed The Aunty Jack Show in the early 1970s, and Neil Wilson.

== Program Synopsis ==
Largely based around performers sourced from the thriving Melbourne stand-up comedy scene of that time, the series brought a number of new comedy acts to national prominence and made major stars of its host, stand-up comedian Wendy Harmer, who later became a top-rating host on morning radio in Sydney in the 1990s, and the regularly featured act, the Doug Anthony All-Stars.

Starting in 1989 and running until 1992 and originally named Tuesday Night Live, The Big Gig showcased both comedy and music and offered opportunities not available to the performers otherwise.

The show typically started with a monologue from host Wendy Harmer (or, from mid-1989 to mid-1990, Glynn Nicholas) before launching into a musical act. Regulars on the show included the house band The Swinging Sidewalks (which included singer Rebecca Barnard), the Bachelors from Prague or Zydeko Jump; the same band would also close the show while the credits played over them.

A regular feature of The Big Gig was the character 'Veronica Glenhuntly' (played by comedian Jean Kittson), an acid-tongued newsreader. Many storylines would run through her, including her on-air wooing, marriage and birth of twins (named Veronica, after herself, and Wayne, after her husband, golf-star Wayne "Lightning" Truscott). She was later joined by weather reporter Clinton Funt, played by musician and comedian Phillip Scott. The character partly parodied contemporary ABC (Victoria) newsreader Mary Delahunty, but her surname also referenced the elite Melbourne suburb of Glenhuntly. Kittson also played several other characters, including ditzy gym nut Candida Royale and sinister flight attendant Rose McCloud.

The Big Gig became known for showcasing many new comedy acts, including Judith Lucy, Etcetera, Anthony Morgan, Jimeoin, Greg Fleet, Lano and Woodley (at the time members of a trio called The Found Objects, with Scott Casley), Scared Weird Little Guys and The Umbilical Brothers,

Nevertheless, major drawcards for both the studio audience and viewers at home was the regular cast. Some played characters—for example, Glynn Nicholas portrayed saccharine children's TV performer Paté Biscuit and her hand puppet Bongo (a broad send-up of 70s Aussie children's TV star Patsy Biscoe who famously appeared with Nicholas on the show in 1990), and oafish policeman Sergeant F*kn Smith. Co-writing Nicholas's material was the young Shaun Micallef. Comedians Matt Parkinson and Matthew Quartermaine, aka The Empty Pockets also played the Lager Boys. The Lager Boys featured in a popular series of anarchic blackout sketches, promoting fictitious products and/or TV programs, and which were noted for including brief intercuts taken from pornographic videos. Viewers often taped The Big Gig on their VCRs in order to replay the Lager Boys segments in slow motion.

After successful guest appearances on the first series Sydney comedian Anthony Ackroyd became a regular cast member. He provided stand up spots as well as the characters Addam (a parody of a coked up advertising guru), the Bard (a Shakespearean style poet) and Constable Constable (partner of Glynn Nicholas's Sergeant Smith). Angela Moore, later a cast member of the children's programme Play School, played another popular semi-regular character, the batty, screechy-voiced housewife Shirley Purvis, with fellow Play School alumnus Glenn Butcher playing her hopeless son Darren. Shirley and Darren were characters they had originated while members of popular comedy troupe The Castanet Club. Other regular cast members included Denise Scott, Tracy Harvey, Lynda Gibson, Phillip Scott and Paul Livingston (as Flacco).

The most popular featured act was the irreverent musical comedy trio the Doug Anthony All Stars, also known as DAAS, whose trademark pseudo-military uniforms and shameless attacks on sacred cows quickly garnered a reputation. The Dougs, as they became known, would often be on at the end of the program and were regulars up until 1991, when they left to produce their own show, DAAS Kapital (also shown on ABC TV). In 2008, all the DAAS appearances from the first two seasons, plus a performance of "Warsong" from 1992 to promote DAAS Kapital, were released on DVD.

== Broadcast details ==
- Series 1: 28 February 1989 to 6 June 1989 (15 episodes)
- Series 2: 29 August 1989 to 21 November 1989 (13 episodes)
- Series 3: 6 March 1990 to 22 May 1990 (12 episodes)
- Series 4: 28 August 1990 to 13 November 1990 (12 episodes)
- Series 5: 30 April 1991 to 16 July 1991 (not 2 July) (11 episodes)
- Specials: 31 March 1992, 19 May 1992 and 14 July 1992

Repeats of The Big Gig are occasionally still shown on The Comedy Channel.

== See also ==
- Recovery
- The 10:30 Slot
- The Sideshow, a similarly formatted show also hosted by Paul McDermott, of the Doug Anthony All Stars
