= List of Good News Week episodes =

Australian satirical news program

Below is the list of episodes for the Australian satirical news program Good News Week. The show aired originally from 1996 to 1998 on the ABC before switching to Network Ten (1999–2000, 2008–2012). Originally, episodes were 30 minutes in length (without advertisements) but have extended to approximately 65 minutes (including advertisements).

== Series overview ==
Season	Episodes	Originally aired	
Season	Episodes	Season premiere	Season finale
1	30	12 April 1996	25 October 1996
2	41	14 February 1997	28 November 1997
3	37	6 March 1998	20 November 1998
4	33	21 March 1999	22 November 1999
5	28	26 February 2000	9 September 2000
6	29	11 February 2008	24 November 2008
7	36	9 February 2009	23 November 2009
8	37	1 February 2010	22 November 2010
9	12	7 February 2011	28 April 2012

== Episodes ==
=== Season 1 (1996) ===
Names shown in bold are the team captain for the episode, where different from the regular captain. Julie McCrossin became permanent captain for team two from episode 14 onwards.

No. overall	No. in season	Original air date	Team One (Mikey Robins)	Team Two (Julie McCrossin)
1	1	12 April 1996	Kate Fischer, James O'Loghlin	**Anthony Ackroyd**, Alison Whyte, Sandy Ireland
2	2	19 April 1996	Fiona Horne, Matt Parkinson	**Anthony Ackroyd**, Kitty Flanagan, Rachael Maza
3	3	26 April 1996	Kate Fischer, Noel Ferrier	**Anthony Ackroyd**, Su Cruickshank, Julia Zemiro
4	4	3 May 1996	Melissa George, Tony Squires	**Anthony Ackroyd**, Lynda Gibson, Amanda Keller
5	5	10 May 1996	Johanna Sweet, Tommy Dean	**Anthony Ackroyd**, Su Cruickshank, Julia Zemiro
6	6	17 May 1996	Colleen McCullough, Scott Capurro	**Su Cruickshank**, Matt Parkinson, Julie McCrossin
7	7	24 May 1996	Kate Fischer, Bob Ellis	**Amanda Keller**, Peter Berner, Julia Zemiro
8	8	31 May 1996	Noel Ferrier, Anthony Ackroyd	**Lynda Gibson**, Kate Fischer, Pru Goward
9	9	7 June 1996	Max Sharam, Alan Saunders	**Su Cruickshank**, Peter Berner, Tanya Bulmer
10	10	14 June 1996	Rebecca Le Tourneau, Greg Fleet	**Anthony Ackroyd**, Julia Zemiro, Julie McCrossin
11	11	21 June 1996	Joy Hopwood, Alan Saunders	Matt Parkinson, Jaslyn Hall
12	12	28 June 1996	Indira Naidoo, Tony Squires	Greg Fleet, Pru Goward
13	13	5 July 1996	Catherine Deveny, Patrick Condon	**Amanda Keller**, Phil Scott, Sandy Ireland
14	14	12 July 1996	Kate Fischer, Noel Ferrier	Anthony Ackroyd, Su Cruickshank
15	15	19 July 1996	Catherine Deveny, Alan Saunders	James O'Loghlin, Johanna Sweet
16	16	26 July 1996	Sarah McDonald, Lex Marinos	Peter Berner, Johanna Sweet
17	17	2 August 1996	Tanya Bulmer, Greg Fleet	Jay Laga'aia, Pru Goward
18	18	9 August 1996	Helen Razer, Tony Squires	James O'Loghlin, Peter Berner
19	19	16 August 1996	Jane Turner, Anthony Morgan	Matt Parkinson, Amanda Keller
20	20	23 August 1996	Indira Naidoo, Anthony Morgan	Peter Berner, Pru Goward
21	21	30 August 1996	Kate Fischer, Noel Ferrier	Anthony Ackroyd, Su Cruickshank
22	22	6 September 1996	Katherine Deveney, Adam Spencer	Jonathon Biggins, Phil Scott
23	23	13 September 1996	Joan Sauers, Alan Saunders	James O'Loghlin, Johanna Sweet
24	24	20 September 1996	**Anthony Ackroyd**, Amy Saunders, Adam Spencer	Russell Fletcher, Tanya Bulmer
25	25	27 September 1996	**Peter Berner**, Helen Razer, Ian Rodgerson	Jay Laga'aia, Julia Zemiro
26	26	4 October 1996	Meredith Burgmann, Alan Saunders	Richard Fidler, Pru Goward
27	27	11 October 1996	Ian Rodgerson, Anthony Morgan	Annette San-Wan, Lynda Gibson
28	28	18 October 1996	Bill O'Chee, Lex Marinos	James O'Loghlin, Johanna Sweet
29	29	25 October 1996	Kate Fischer, Noel Ferrier	Anthony Ackroyd, Su Cruickshank
30	30	1 November 1996	Helen Razer, Adam Spencer	Peter Berner, Amanda Keller

=== Season 2 (1997) ===
No. overall	No. in season	Original air date	Team One (Mikey Robins)	Team Two (Julie McCrossin)
31	1	14 February 1997	Happy Ho, Adam Spencer	Magda Szubanski, Pru Goward
32	2	21 February 1997	Glenn Butcher, unknown	James O'Loghlin, Johanna Griggs
33	3	28 February 1997	Sue-Ann Post, Anthony Morgan	Peter Berner, Georgie Parker
34	4	7 March 1997	Ann Summers, Adam Spencer	Mark Trevorrow, Jean Kittson
35	5	14 March 1997	Alan Saunders, Gary Sweet	Magda Szubanski, Johanna Griggs
36	6	21 March 1997	Leah Delaria, Jonathan Biggins	James O'Loghlin, Rod Quantock
37	7	28 March 1997	Natasha Stott Despoja, Catharine Lumby	Amanda Keller, Rachael Berger
38	8	4 April 1997	Lynda Gibson, Richard Fidler	Rod Quantock, Peter Berner
39	9	11 April 1997	Anthony Morgan, Rod Quantock	Margaret Scott, Richard Fidler
40	10	18 April 1997	Ian Plimer, Adam Spencer	Dr Karl Kruszelnicki, Ann Henderson-Sellers
41	11	25 April 1997	Jim Rose, Greg Proops	Jeff Green, Boothby Graffoe
42	12	2 May 1997	Jane Mac, Doug Mulray	Julia Zemiro, Boothby Graffoe
43	13	9 May 1997	Amy Saunders, Shaun Micallef	Adam Spencer, Gabby Milgate
44	14	16 May 1997	Kate Fischer, Adam Spencer	Rod Quantock, James O'Loghlin
45	15	23 May 1997	Margaret Scott, Anthony Morgan	Bill Bailey, Amanda Keller
46	16	30 May 1997	Jill Subule, Tony Squires	Johanna Griggs, Peter Berner
47	17	13 June 1997	Natasha Stott Despoja, Ian Sinclair	Adam Spencer, Kate Fischer
48	18	20 June 1997	Penny Cook, Crackers Keenan	Jay Laga'aia, Johanna Griggs
49	19	27 June 1997	Tanya Bulmer, Doug Mulray	Matt Day, Jay Laga'aia
50	20	4 July 1997	Amy Saunders, Shaun Micallef	Adam Spencer, Jay Laga'aia
51	21	11 July 1997	Alison Whyte, Tracey Holmes	Peter Berner, James O'Loghlin
52	22	18 July 1997	Margaret Scott, David Astle	Peter Berner, Gabby Milgate
53	23	25 July 1997	Jenny Tabakoff, Greg Fleet	Barry Diamond, Amanda Keller
54	24	1 August 1997	Margo Kingston, Alan Saunders	Adam Spencer, Kathy Bail
55	25	8 August 1997	Margaret Scott, Anthony Morgan	Peter Berner, Lynda Gibson
56	26	15 August 1997	Kate Fischer, Gerry Connolly	James O'Loghlin, Marise Payne
57	27	22 August 1997	Rhoda Roberts, Geoff Kelso	Rod Quantock, Johanna Griggs
58	28	29 August 1997	Jill Ray, Anthony Morgan	Rod Quantock, Leah Purcell
59	29	5 September 1997	Jan Power, Anthony Morgan	Margaret Scott, Rod Quantock
60	30	12 September 1997	Lex Marinos, Emma Tom	Rhys Muldoon, Robyn Archer
61	31	19 September 1997	Jennie George, Wil Anderson	Peter Berner, Penny Cooper
62	32	26 September 1997	Margo Kingston, Alan Saunders	Adam Spencer, Kathy Bail
63	33	3 October 1997	Kate Fischer, Karl Kruszelnicki	Adam Spencer, Julia Zemiro
64	34	10 October 1997	Deborah Conway, Frank Woodley	Colin Lane, Gabby Milgate
65	35	17 October 1997	Monique Brumby, Paul Fletcher	Adam Spencer, Natasha Stott Despoja
66	36	24 October 1997	Margaret Scott, Tim Farriss	Rhys Muldoon, Joanna Griggs
67	37	31 October 1997	Tanya Bulmer, Wil Anderson	Rod Quantock, Julia Zemiro
68	38	7 November 1997	Margo Kingston, Anthony Morgan	Gareth Evans, Amanda Keller
69	39	14 November 1997	James O'Loghlin, Diana Reid	Penny Cook, Sir James Killen
70	40	21 November 1997	Rhoda Roberts, John Safran	Peter Berner, Joanna Griggs
71	41	28 November 1997	Lucy Bell, Doug Mulray	Adam Spencer, Amanda Keller

=== Season 3 (1998) ===
Names shown in bold are the team captain for the episode, where different from the regular captain.

No. overall	No. in season	Original air date	Team One (Mikey Robins)	Team Two (Julie McCrossin)
72	1	6 March 1998	Poppy King, Anthony Morgan	Peter Berner, Amanda Keller
73	2	13 March 1998	Wil Anderson, Kate Fischer	Sister Veronica Brady, Rod Quantock
74	3	20 March 1998	Andy Parsons, Henry Naylor	Adam Spencer, Natasha Stott Despoja
75	4	27 March 1998	Margaret Scott, HG Nelson	Rich Hall, Jennifer Byrne
76	5	3 April 1998	Jenny Eclair, Simon Munnery	Ed Byrne, Rod Quantock
77	6	10 April 1998	Lynda Gibson, Al Murray	Adam Spencer, Rich Hall
78	7	17 April 1998	Rich Fulcher, Anthony Morgan	Mark Trevorrow, Johanna Griggs
79	8	24 April 1998	Kate Lundy, Doug Mulray	Peter Berner, Helen Coonan
80	9	1 May 1998	Kate Fischer, Graham Richardson	Chris Franklin, Amanda Keller
81	10	8 May 1998	Kate Carnell, Tim Flannery	Sue Sofflemyer, Adam Spencer
82	11	15 May 1998	Margo Kingston, Robert Gottliebsen	James O'Loghlin, Johanna Griggs
83	12	22 May 1998	Louise Hegarty, Auberon Waugh	Marise Payne, Rod Quantock
84	13	29 May 1998	Rachel Blake, Anthony Morgan	Peter Berner, Rhoda Roberts
85	14	5 June 1998	Liz Ellis, Stephen Curry	Amanda Keller, James O'Loghlin
86	15	12 June 1998	Margaret Scott, Dr Karl	Kim Hope, Adam Spencer
87	16	19 June 1998	Suzanne Johnston, Wil Anderson	Alan Brough, Julia Zemiro
88	17	26 June 1998	Tanya Bulmer, Rod Quantock	Sir James Killen, Zoe Carides
89	18	3 July 1998	Jill Singer, Sister Veronica Brady	James O'Loghlin, Adam Couper
90	19	10 July 1998	Poppy King, Peter Meisel	Paul Barry, Amanda Keller
91	20	17 July 1998	Tim Ferguson, Margaret Scott	Natasha Stott Despoja, Adam Spencer
92	21	24 July 1998	Angela Catterns, Sir James Killen	Dave O'Neil, Suzanne Johnston
93	22	31 July 1998	Wil Anderson, Johanna Griggs	Deborah Mailman, Geoff Kelso
94	23	7 August 1998	**Adam Spencer**, Rove McManus, Tanya Bulmer	Peter Berner, Amanda Vanstone
95	24	14 August 1998	Jill Singer, Adam Couper	Dave O'Neil, Rani
96	25	4 September 1998	Adam Spencer, Ruth Ozeki	Margaret Scott, Richard Stubbs
97	26	11 September 1998	Katrina Shields, Adam Couper	Rod Quantock, Cheryl Kernot
98	27	18 September 1998	Jackie Kelly, Rove McManus	Peter Berner, Sister Veronica Brady
99	28	25 September 1998	Penny Cooper, Crackers Keenan	Greg Fleet, Amanda Keller
100	29	2 October 1998	James O'Loghlin, Barry Jones	Ian Sinclair, Natasha Stott Despoja
101	30	9 October 1998	Ruth Cracknell, Bill Bailey	Suzanne Johnston, Adam Spencer
102	31	16 October 1998	Tanya Bulmer, George Negus	James O'Loghlin, Jennifer Byrne
103	32	23 October 1998	Ed Byrne, Arj Barker	Mandy Knight, Craig Campbell
104	33	28 October 1998 (100th Episode Special)	Margaret Scott, Anthony Morgan, Rove McManus	Rod Quantock, Amanda Keller, Johanna Griggs
105	34	30 October 1998	Peter Berner, Jackie Kelly	Mandy Knight, Gary Sweet
106	35	6 November 1998	Jean Kittson, Rove McManus	Michael Gudinski, Amanda Keller
107	36	13 November 1998	Adam Couper, Liz Weekes	Maggie Alderson, Adam Spencer
108	37	20 November 1998	Margaret Scott, Anthony Morgan	Amanda Keller, Peter Berner

=== Season 4 (1999) ===
No. in Season	Air Date	Mikey's Team	Julie's Team
1	21 March 1999	Anthony Morgan, Natasha Stott Despoja	Amanda Keller, Rhys Muldoon
2	28 March 1999	Margaret Scott, James O'Loghlin	Johanna Griggs, Peter Berner
3	4 April 1999	Jean Kittson, Richard Fidler	Corinne Grant, Adam Couper
4	11 April 1999	Lynn Ferguson, Phil Kay	Julia Zemiro, Rich Hall
5	18 April 1999	Tanya Bulmer, Phil Kay	Rod Quantock, Adam Bloom
6	25 April 1999	Anthony Morgan, Rachel Griffiths	Johanna Griggs, Ed Byrne
7	2 May 1999	Rani, HG Nelson	Amanda Keller, Rhys Muldoon
8	9 May 1999	Bernie Hobbs, Adam Couper	Kate Carnell, Karl Kruszelnicki
9	16 May 1999	Mimi Macpherson, Rove McManus	Dee Margetts, Rod Quantock
10	23 May 1999	Tara Moss, HG Nelson	Johanna Griggs, Adam Hills
11	30 May 1999	Margaret Wertheim, David Callan	Amanda Keller, Craig McLachlan
12	6 June 1999	Mimi Macpherson, James O'Loghlin	Corrine Grant, Wil Anderson
13	13 June 1999	Brooke Satchwell, Barry Jones	Amanda Vanstone, Rod Quantock
14	20 June 1999	Jean Kittson, Jason Li	Corrine Grant, Peter Berner
15	27 June 1999	Margaret Scott, Anthony Morgan	Tasma Walton, Rhys Muldoon
16	4 July 1999	Indira Naidoo, Matt Day	Johanna Griggs, Andrew Denton
17	11 July 1999	Frank Woodley, Colin Lane (as Lano and Woodley)	Amanda Keller, Wil Anderson
18	18 July 1999	Susan Halliday, Anthony Morgan	Corrine Grant, Jeremy Sims
19	25 July 1999	Brooke Satchwell, Tim Ferguson	Gretel Killeen, Peter Berner
20	1 August 1999	Margaret Scott, HG Nelson	Amanda Keller, Nick Earls
21	8 August 1999	Jean Kittson, James Smith	Gretel Killeen, Rhys Muldoon
22	15 August 1999	Angela Bishop, Richard Fidler	Trisha Goddard, Lex Marinos
23	30 August 1999	Joanne Nova, Karl Kruszelnicki	Amanda Keller, Mike Harper
24	17 September 1999	Thomas Keneally, Joanne Nova	Wil Anderson, Natasha Stott Despoja
25	27 September 1999	Jackie Kelly, Matthew White	Amanda Keller, Matt Dunn
26	4 October 1999	Jean Kittson, Bob Brown	Kaz Cooke, Rod Quantock
27	11 October 1999	Tanya Plibersek, Anthony Morgan	Johanna Griggs, Andrew Bartlett
28	18 October 1999	Jean Kittson, Matthew Reilly	Tracey Wickham, Rod Quantock
29	25 October 1999	Zuzu & the Supernuffs, Matthew Foley	Tracey Wickham, Rod Quantock
30	1 November 1999	Poppy King, John Moloney	Amanda Keller, Phil Cleary
31	8 November 1999	Angela Bishop, Adam Hills	Marise Payne, Wil Anderson
32	15 November 1999	Margaret Scott, Richard Fidler	Tracey Wickham, Wil Anderson
33	22 November 1999	Natasha Stott Despoja, Ian Healy	Johanna Griggs, Rod Quantock

=== Season 5 (2000) ===
No. in Season	Air Date	Mikey's Team	Julie's Team	Musical/Special Guests
1	26 February 2000	Amanda Vanstone, Nick Giannopoulos	Amanda Keller, Tim Fischer	Midnight Oil, Taxiride, Dili Allstars
2	4 March 2000	Jean Kittson, Richard Fidler	Adam Hills, Molly Ringwald	Sprung Monkey, Simply Barbara, Rhubarb
3	11 March 2000	Corinne Grant, Rove McManus	Lucy Bell, James O'Loghlin	Diana Ah Naid, Poptarts, Marie Wilson
4	18 March 2000	Jimeoin, Susie Maroney	Amanda Keller, Rod Quantock	Regurgitator, Marcia Hines, Poptarts
5	25 March 2000	Jean Kittson, John Astin	Rich Hall, Wil Anderson	The Whitlams, Gadflys, Splendid, Otis Lee Crenshaw
6	1 April 2000	Kim Hope, John Moloney	Boothby Graffoe, Ross Noble	Deadstar, Boothby Graffoe and Mick Moriaty, Poptarts, Deborah Conway
7	8 April 2000	Tina Cousins, Rove McManus	Rhys Muldoon, Gretel Killeen	Michael Spiby, Poptarts, Tina Cousins, Vanessa Amorosi
8	15 April 2000	Eddie Izzard, Rod Quantock	Margaret Smith, John Moloney	Killing Heidi, Tripod, Vika and Linda
9	29 April 2000	Jean Kittson, Matthew White	Barry Sheen, Amanda Keller	Royal Crown Revue, Vanessa Amorosi, The Lucksmiths
10	6 May 2000	Dr Heather Couper, Richard Fidler	Adam Hills, Natasha Stott Despoja	Gadflys, Tom Gleeson, Luka Bloom, Paul McDermott ("Friday Night")
11	13 May 2000	Alyssa Sutherland, James O'Loghlin	Mark Trevorrow, Gretel Killeen	Royal Crown Revue, Alex Lloyd, Paul McDermott and Mark Trevorrow ("Cracklin' Rosie")
12	20 May 2000	Angela Bishop, Dave O'Neil	Amanda Keller, Wil Anderson	Grinspoon, Eva Trout, Tiddas, Groove Terminator
13	27 May 2000	Tanya Bulmer, Johanna Griggs	Rove McManus, Rhys Muldoon	Christine Anu, Powderfinger, Poptarts, Neil Murray
14	3 June 2000	Rod Quantock, Chloe Maxwell	Lucy Bell, John Moloney	The Whitlams, Paul McDermott and John Moloney ("REM Medley"), Blue Rodeo, The Lucksmiths, Paul Kelly and Professor Ratbaggy
15	10 June 2000	Cheyne Coates, James O'Loghlin	Kram, Corrine Grant	Los Amigos Invisibles, Al Jarreau
16	17 June 2000	Angela Bishop, Julien Temple	Gretel Killeen, Greg Fleet	Leonardo's Bride, David Bridie, Zoo Bombs, Cast Performance ("Unchain My Heart/GST", Take One)
17	24 June 2000	Kate Fischer, Rove McManus	Brooke Satchwell, Dave O'Neil	Gadflys, Lo-tel, Cast Performance ("Unchain My Heart/GST", Take Two)
18	1 July 2000	Tim Ferguson, Wendie Malick	Wil Anderson, Amanda Keller	Pretty Violet Stain, Deadstar, Paul Kelly and Professor Ratbaggy
19	8 July 2000	Richard Fidler, Wendie Malick	Rod Quantock, Corrine Grant	Grinspoon, The Lucksmiths, Josh Abrahams and Amiel Daemion
20	15 June 2000	Tanya Bulmer, Adrian Edmondson	Adam Spencer, Lisa Forrest	Oblivia, Jeff Lang, Paul McDermott and Front End Loader ("Oops...I Did It Again")
21	22 July 2000	Frank Woodley, Colin Lane (as Lano and Woodley)	Angela Bishop, Tommy Dean	Midnight Oil, Endorphin, Lano and Woodley, A Perfect Circle
22	29 July 2000	Rove McManus, Leah McLeod	Mark Trevorrow, Amanda Keller	Travis, Friendly, Paul McDermott and Mark Trevorrow ("Lucky Stars")
23	5 August 2000	Chloe Maxwell, Dick Johnson	Wil Anderson, Johanna Griggs	Marcia Hines, Travis, Gadflys, Ben Lee
24	12 August 2000	Kerri-Anne Kennerley, James O'Loghlin	Rose Byrne, Matthew White	Gomez, The Mavis's
25	19 August 2000	Jean Kittson, Kinky Freedman	Tanya Bulmer, Ben Elton	Warumpi Band, Kinky Freedman and Little Jewford
26	26 August 2000	Annalise Braakensiek, Richard Fidler	Dave Hughes, Gretel Killeen	Tex Perkins, Leonardo's Bride, Karma County
27	2 September 2000	Margaret Scott, Pete McCarthy	Wil Anderson, Brooke Satchwell	Oblivia, Perfect Circle, Gadflys
28	9 September 2000	Mark Trevorrow, Marcia Hines	Jean Kittson, Greg Fleet	Fuel, Paul McDermott, Marcia Hines and Mark Trevorrow ("Torn Between Two Lovers"), Paul McDermott and Cast ("I Was Made For Loving You/Poison")

=== Season 6 (2008) ===
Some sources cite the episodes dated 13 October 2008 and later as Season 2, due to it being named as such when it was made available on iTunes.

No. in Season	Airdate	Mikey Robins' team	Claire Hooper's team
1	11 February 2008	Pat Cash, Cal Wilson	Frank Woodley, Craig Reucassel
2	18 February 2008	Fiona O'Loughlin, Matthew Hardy	Meshel Laurie, Wil Anderson
3	25 February 2008	Tom Gleeson, Brooke Satchwell	Tommy Dean, Josh Thomas
4	3 March 2008	Charli Delaney, Ross Noble	Ian Dickson, Akmal Saleh
5	10 March 2008	Liz Ellis, Lehmo	Colin Lane, Daliso Chaponda
6	17 March 2008	Pia Miranda, John Maloney	Craig Reucassel, Jimeoin
7	7 April 2008	Corinne Grant, Reginald D. Hunter	Wil Anderson, Frank Woodley
8	14 April 2008	Kristen Schaal, Ross Noble	Josh Thomas, Eddie Ifft
9	21 April 2008	Reginald D. Hunter, Fuzzy Agolley	Marc Maron, Fiona O'Loughlin
10	28 April 2008	Julia Morris, Chris Taylor	Mark Watson, Julie McCrossin
11	5 May 2008	Annabel Crabb, Steve Patterson	Arj Barker, Don Letts
12	12 May 2008	Fiona O'Loughlin, Shane Dundas	Colin Lane, Corinne Grant
13	26 May 2008	Cal Wilson, Chris Taylor	Ed Kavalee, Eddie Ifft
14	2 June 2008	Jo Stanley, Tom Gleeson	Dave Thornton, Rhys Muldoon
15	9 June 2008	Julia Morris, Sammy J	Frank Woodley, Kelly Rowland
16	16 June 2008	Kitty Flanagan, Matt Hardy	Josh Lawson, Akmal Saleh
17	23 June 2008	Elissa Down, Justin Hamilton	Josh Thomas, Eddie Ifft
18	30 June 2008	Jono Coleman, Julia Morris	Josh Lawson, Ed Kavalee
19	7 July 2008	Cal Wilson, Tom Gleeson	Fiona O'Loughlin, Lenny Henry
20	14 July 2008	Amanda Keller, Akmal Saleh	Ed Kavalee, Corinne Grant
21	28 July 2008	Lindsay Webb, Kitty Flanagan	Josh Thomas, Meshel Laurie
22	4 August 2008	Liz Ellis, Akmal Saleh	Kate Ellis, HG Nelson
23	13 October 2008	Julia Morris, Frank Woodley	Kaz James, Wil Anderson
24	20 October 2008	Nicole da Silva, Stephen K. Amos	Carl Barron, Corinne Grant
25	27 October 2008	Madeleine West, Akmal Saleh	Brian McFadden, Fiona O'Loughlin
26	3 November 2008	Cal Wilson, Tom Gleeson	Craig Reucassel, Julia Zemiro
27	10 November 2008	Candace Bushnell, Kitty Flanagan	Julie Bishop, Sammy J
28	17 November 2008	Ruby Rose, Akmal Saleh	Ronan Keating, Corinne Grant
29	24 November 2008	Cal Wilson, Colin Lane, Kitty Flanagan, Jimeoin, Amanda Keller, Tom Gleeson	Wil Anderson, Lehmo, Fiona O'Loughlin, Josh Lawson, HG Nelson, Corinne Grant

=== Season 7 (2009) ===
No. in Season	Airdate	Mikey's team	Claire's team	Musical/special guests
1	9 February 2009	Cal Wilson, Jason Coleman	Georgie Parker, Wil Anderson	none
2	16 February 2009	Shaun Micallef, Julia Morris	Lehmo, Dave Hughes	none
3	23 February 2009	Tom Gleeson, Ajay Rochester	Jordan Raskopoulos, Akmal Saleh	none
4	2 March 2009	Danny Bhoy, Kitty Flanagan	Dr. Chris Brown, Fiona O'Loughlin	Wes Carr
5	9 March 2009	Jimeoin, Cal Wilson	Amanda Palmer, Frank Woodley	none
6	16 March 2009	Natalie Bassingthwaighte, Tom Gleeson	Rob Carlton, DeAnne Smith	none
7	23 March 2009	Liz Ellis, Julia Morris	Kram, Akmal Saleh	none
8	19 April 2009	Arj Barker, Cal Wilson	Jason Byrne, Reginald D. Hunter	The Wolfgramm Sisters, Tripod
9	4 May 2009	Liz Ellis, John Moloney	Corinne Grant, Sugar Sammy	none
10	11 May 2009	Julia Morris, Tony Woods	Stephen K. Amos, Adam Hills	none
11	18 May 2009	Tom Gleeson, Gretel Killeen	Eddie Perfect, Akmal Saleh	none
12	25 May 2009	Colin Lane, DeAnne Smith	Josh Thomas, Reggie Watts	none
13	1 June 2009	Kitty Flanagan, Wes Carr	Kelly Clarkson, Wil Anderson	none
14	8 June 2009	David Campbell, Julia Morris	Bob Brown, Corinne Grant	Kate Miller-Heidke
15	15 June 2009	Ross Noble, Celia Pacquola	Kavyen Temperley, Wil Anderson	none
16	22 June 2009	Peter Berner, Amanda Keller	Steve Hughes, Daniel Townes	none
17	29 June 2009	Tim Ferguson, Kitty Flanagan	Frank Woodley, Corinne Grant	none
18	6 July 2009	Felicity Ward, Jimeoin	Akmal Saleh, Denise Scott	none
19	27 July 2009	Fiona O'Loughlin, Mike Wilmot	Corinne Grant, Stephen K. Amos	none
20	3 August 2009	Kitty Flanagan, Anh Do	Josh Thomas, Josh Lawson	Manchoir, Shaun Micallef
21	10 August 2009	Liz Ellis, Jeff Green	Akmal Saleh, Georgie Parker	none
22	17 August 2009	Peter Berner, Julia Morris	Carl Barron, Corinne Grant	none
23	24 August 2009	Julia Zemiro, Tom Gleeson	Fiona O'Loughlin, Tony Woods	none
24	31 August 2009	Cal Wilson, Jimmy Barnes	Colin Lane, Tom Ballard	none
25	7 September 2009	Eddie Ifft, Kitty Flanagan	Newton Faulkner, Akmal Saleh	Cassie Davis
26	14 September 2009	The Amazing Johnathan, Celia Pacquola	Andrew G, Justin Hamilton	none
27	21 September 2009	Cal Wilson, Julian Schiller	Frank Woodley, Jean Kittson	none
28	28 September 2009	Julia Morris, Tom Gleeson	Ed Kavalee, Magda Szubanski	Bluejuice, Felicity Urquhart
29	5 October 2009	Wendy Harmer, Jimeoin	Colin Lane, Steven Gates	none
30	12 October 2009	Cal Wilson, Phil Jamieson	Fiona O'Loughlin, Stephen K Amos	none
31	19 October 2009	Liz Ellis, Tom Gleeson	Eamon Sullivan, Corinne Grant	Andrew Hansen, Ricki Lee Coulter
32	26 October 2009	Sarah McLeod, Adam Spencer	Hannah Gadsby, Wil Anderson	Paul Dempsey
33	2 November 2009	Kitty Flanagan, Matt Preston	Akmal Saleh, Frank Woodley	none
34	9 November 2009	John Moloney, Julia Morris	Virginia Gay, Wil Anderson	none
35	16 November 2009	Kitty Flanagan, Tom Gleeson	Ben Elton, Andrew Hansen	none
36	23 November 2009	Julia Morris, Tom Gleeson, Georgie Parker, Peter Berner, Tim Ferguson, Cal Wilson	Fiona O'Loughlin, Wil Anderson, Corinne Grant, Josh Thomas, Justin Hamilton, Frank Woodley	Tripod

=== Season 8 (2010) ===
No. in Season	Airdate	Mikey's team	Claire's team	Musical/special guests
1	1 February 2010	Cal Wilson, Ross Noble	Corinne Grant, Akmal Saleh	Wes Carr, The McClymonts
2	8 February 2010	Jimeoin, Kitty Flanagan	Tim Minchin, Colin Lane	none
3	15 February 2010	Liz Ellis, Peter Berner	Josh Thomas, Fiona O'Loughlin	none
4	22 February 2010	Stewart Francis, Tom Gleeson	Corinne Grant, Tom Ballard	Tripod, Elana Stone, Kevin Rudd
5	1 March 2010	Eddie Ifft, Ricki-Lee Coulter	Des Bishop, Amanda Palmer	none
6	8 March 2010	Jackie Loeb, Peter Berner	Jeff Green, Celia Pacquola	Tokyo Shock Boys
7	15 March 2010	DeAnne Smith, Craig Hill	Eamon Sullivan, Akmal Saleh	Phil Jamieson, Mike Mizanin
8	12 April 2010	Fiona O'Loughlin, Tom Gleeson	Jason Byrne, Josh Thomas	Julian Clary, Sammy J
9	19 April 2010	Cal Wilson, Reginald D. Hunter	Russell Kane, Frank Woodley	Andrew O'Neill, Tripod
10	26 April 2010	DeAnne Smith, Dom Irrera	Gina Yashere, Jason Byrne	Harlem Gospel Choir
11	3 May 2010	Amanda Keller, Daniel Sloss	David Campbell, Meshel Laurie	Craig Hill
12	10 May 2010	Erin McNaught, Tom Gleeson	Andy Lee, Hamish Blake	The Fatcocks
13	17 May 2010	Kitty Flanagan, John Jarratt	Tina Arena, Wil Anderson	Dan Sultan
14	24 May 2010	Cal Wilson, Matt Preston	Corinne Grant, George Calombaris	Katie Noonan, Ian Moss, The Umbilical Brothers
15	31 May 2010	Marcia Hines, Tom Gleeson	Akmal Saleh, Fiona O'Loughlin	Ash Grunwald
16	7 June 2010	Matthew Hayden, Julia Morris	Craig Reucassel, Josh Thomas	Karl Kruszelnicki
17	14 June 2010	Liz Ellis, Sammy J	Pauley Perrette, Wil Anderson	none
18	21 June 2010	Cal Wilson, Peter Berner	Frank Woodley, Melissa Barbieri	Rai Thistlethwayte, Elana Stone
19	28 June 2010	Libby Trickett, Tom Gleeson	Colin Lane, Tommy Dean	Basement Birds, Christa Hughes
20	5 July 2010	Kitty Flanagan, Tim Ferguson	Jeff Green, Arj Barker	Dan Sultan, Sally Seltmann
21	26 July 2010	Marion Grasby, Tom Gleeson	Samuel Johnson, Michael Kosta	Justine Clarke, Melle Mel and Scorpio, Rex Lee
22	2 August 2010	Denise Scott, Jimeoin	Frank Woodley, Paul Mac	Tamsin Carroll, Deni Hines
23	9 August 2010	Kitty Flanagan, Taika Waititi	Justin Hamilton, Josh Thomas	Megan Washington, Bluejuice
24	16 August 2010	Clare Bowditch, Peter Berner	Michael Kosta, Corinne Grant	Phillip Scott
25	23 August 2010	Sarah Wilson, Tom Gleeson	Ella Hooper, Akmal Saleh	Old Man River
26	30 August 2010	Merrick Watts, Jimmy Barnes	Frank Woodley, Megan Washington	none
27	6 September 2010	Julia Morris, Jay Laga'aia	Jeff Green, Caitlin Stasey	Angie Hart
28	13 September 2010	Amanda Keller, Mark Trevorrow	Dave O'Neil, Erin McNaught	none
29	21 September 2010	Cal Wilson, Tom Gleeson	Josh Thomas, Dr. Chris Brown	Lior, Elana Stone
30	27 September 2010	Julia Morris, Andrew Günsberg	Akmal Saleh, Corinne Grant	Axis of Awesome
31	3 October 2010	Libby Trickett, Anh Do	Ava Vidal, Dave O'Neil	Kasey Chambers, Nikki Hudson
32	18 October 2010	Kitty Flanagan, Tom Gleeson	Colin Lane, Carrie Fisher	Craig Hill, Paris Wells
33	25 October 2010	Marcia Hines, Jimeoin	Josh Thomas, Wil Anderson	Operator Please, Michael Chugg
34	1 November 2010	Merrick Watts, Cal Wilson	Corinne Grant, Sammy J	Brian Cadd, Arj Barker
35	8 November 2010	Julia Morris, Gordon Southern	Sarah Wilson, Akmal Saleh	John Waters
36	16 November 2010	DeAnne Smith, Dave Thornton	Dave O'Neil, Frank Woodley	Abby Dobson, Lara Goodridge, Andy Bull
37	22 November 2010	Cal Wilson, Tom Gleeson	Fiona O'Loughlin, Josh Thomas	The Verses, Paul Mac, Eric Stonestreet

=== Season 9 (2011) ===
No. in Season	Airdate	Mikey's team	Claire's team	Musical/special guests
1	7 February 2011	Cal Wilson, Tom Gleeson, Kitty Flanagan, Randy	Fiona O'Loughlin, Matt Preston, Josh Thomas, Akmal Saleh	Kasey Chambers, Reggie Watts
2	14 February 2011	Amanda Keller, Dave Thornton	Sarah Wilson, Arj Barker	The McClymonts, Tripod
3	21 February 2011	Meshel Laurie, Eddie Ifft	Corinne Grant, Ryan Fitzgerald	Amy Meredith, Paris Wells
4	28 February 2011	Liz Ellis, Lehmo	Josh Thomas, Eamon Sullivan	Andy Bull, Adalita Srsen
5	7 March 2011	Colin Lane, Julia Morris	Erin McNaught, Jason Byrne	none
6	14 March 2011	Cal Wilson, Jamie Whincup	Amanda Palmer, Akmal Saleh	none
7	21 March 2011	Fiona O'Loughlin, Mark Watson	Wil Anderson, Lauren Jackson	Chris Pontius
8	28 March 2011	Kitty Flanagan, Jimeoin	Ryan Fitzgerald, Dave O'Neil	Sammy J, Randy
9	11 April 2011	Greg Proops, Maria Bamford	Stephen K. Amos, Jason Byrne	Simon Pegg, Nick Frost, Eddie Perfect
10	18 April 2011	DeAnne Smith, Reginald D. Hunter, Cal Wilson, George Calombaris	Wil Anderson, Caroline Rhea, Gary Mehigan, Tom Gleeson	Ali McGregor, Carl-Einar Häckner
11	9 May 2011	Julia Morris, Sean Walsh	Matt Moran, Wil Anderson	Alexander Gow
12	28 April 2012	Cal Wilson, Jason Byrne, Corinne Grant, Stephen K. Amos	Wil Anderson, Frank Woodley, Randy, Carl-Einar Häckner	Tom Gleeson

== See also ==
- List of Good News Week spin-off series episodes
