= List of Good News Week spin-off series episodes =

The following is a list of Good News Week spin-off series episodes.

== Good News Year (1997) ==
Hosted by Paul McDermott, this show aired on 31 December 1997.

Mikey's Team	Julie's Team
Tanya Bulmer, Anthony Morgan, Richard Fidler, Lex Marinos, Rhys Muldoon, Margaret Scott.	Johanna Griggs, Adam Spencer, James O'Loghlin, Julia Zemiro, Amanda Keller, Jay Laga'aia.

== Good News Weekend (1998) ==
No. in Season	Air Date	Mikey's Team	Julie's Team	Musical Performances
1	13 June 1998	Tanya Bulmer, Jay Laga'aia	Fiona Horne, Ian Rogerson	Gadflys, The Mavis's, Paul McDermott ("Perfect Day")
2	20 June 1998	Cheryl Kernot, Louise Heggarty	Peter Berner, Kirk Pengilly	Gadflys, Custard, Paul McDermott ("Stand By Me")
3	27 June 1998	Kym Hope, Mark Holden	Mark Trevorrow, Amanda Keller	Gadflys, Mark Holden, Mark Trevorrow and Paul McDermott ("Make You My Lady")
4	4 July 1998	Zoe Carides, Anthony Morgan	Fiona Horne, Peter Berner	Gadflys, Anthony Morgan, Paul McDermott and Fiona Horne ("Only You")
5	11 July 1998	Tanya Bulmer, Lex Marinos	Mark Trevorrow, Joanna Griggs	Gadflys, Bean, Mark Trevorrow and Cast
6	18 July 1998	Georgina Naido, Adam Couper	Rebecca Barnard, Adam Spencer	Gadflys, Rebecca Barnard ("Gypsies, Tramps and Thieves")
7	25 July 1998	Anthony Ackroyd, Zoe Carrides	Amanda Keller, James O'Loghlin	Gadflys, Human Nature, Cast Performance ("Opus of Peace")
8	1 August 1998	Kim Hope, Anthony Morgan	Rebecca Barnard, Alan Brough	Gadflys ("Butterfly")
9	8 August 1998	Kim Hope, Tony Squires	Fiona Horne, Mark Trevorrow	Karma County, Paul McDermott and Mark Trevorrow ("Can't Take My Eyes Off You"), Paul McDermott and Fiona Horne ("Shut Up/Kiss Me")
10	15 August 1998	Wendy Harmer, Rove McManus	HG Nelson, Joanna Griggs	The Living End, Jeannie Lewis, Cast Performance ("He Will Provide")

== Good News Year- Eastern Version (1998) ==
Airdate	Mikey's team	Julie's team
31 December 1998	Margaret Scott, Anthony Morgan	Adam Spencer, Joanna Griggs

Special guest appearances were made during the show by Tanya Bulmer and Rod Quantock

== Good News Year- Western Version (1998) ==
Air date	Mikey's team	Julie's team
31 December 1998	Tanya Bulmer, Rove McManus	Sister Veronica Brady, Rod Quantock

With special guest appearances from Anthony Morgan, Adam Spencer

== Good News Week NightLite (1999) ==
No. in Season	Air Date	Mikey's Team	Julie's Team	Musical Performance
1	6 May 1999	Brooke Satchwell, Glenn Butcher	Sacha Horler, Paul Capsis	Gadflys, Glenn Butcher, Paul McDermott and Paul Capsis ("The Love You Save"), Paul McDermott ("Shivers")
2	13 May 1999	Tanya Bulmer, Jabba	Amanda Keller, Kram	Gadflys, Spiderbait, Paul McDermott ("Psycho Killer")
3	20 May 1999	Rebecca Barnard, Dylan Lewis	Frank Woodley, Colin Lane	Gadflys and Neil Finn, Paul McDermott and Rebecca Barnard ("The Drugs")
4	27 May 1999	Julia Zemiro, Greg Fleet	Corinne Grant, Alan Brough	Gadflys, Otis Lee Crenshaw
5	3 June 1999	Marcia Hines, Gary Eck	Jodie J Hill, Adam Couper	Gadflys, Custard, Paul McDermott and Marcia Hines ("I Just Don't Know What to Do with Myself")
6	10 June 1999	Nadine Garner, Peter Helliar	Fiona Horne, Peter Berner	Gadflys, Steve Abbott (as The Sandman), Paul McDermott ("Guilty of Nothing")
7	17 June 1999	Kim Hope, Richard Fidler	Kate Lundy, Rhys Muldoon	Gadflys, Suzie Higgie, Cast Performance ("Then He Kissed Me")
8	24 June 1999	Tanya Bulmer, Greg Fleet	Corinne Grant, Kram	Karma County, Josh Abrahams and Amiel Daemion, Paul Livingston (as Flacco) and Paul McDermott ("The Rose")
9	1 July 1999	Jodie J Hill, Daniel Greaves	Amanda Keller, Mark Trevorrow	Gadflys, Mark Trevorrow, The Watchmen, Mark Trevorrow and Paul McDermott ("Look at Me/Believe")
10	8 July 1999	Kim Hope, Mandawuy Yunupingu	Yvette Duncan, Peter Berner	Powderfinger, Gadflys and Mandawuy Yunupingu, Paul McDermott ("Jen and Helen")
11	15 July 1999	Zoe Naylor, Greg Fleet	Tasma Walton, Mark Trevorrow	Rebecca's Empire, Slava Grigoryan, Paul McDermott and Mark Trevorrow ("Windmills of Your Mind"), Rebecca Barnard and Mark Trevorrow
12	22 July 1999	Pippa Grandison, Richard Fidler	Corinne Grant, Adam Couper	The Watchmen, Gadflys, Steve Abbott (as The Sandman), Paul McDermott ("Mercy")
13	29 July 1999	FLACCO AND SANDMAN SPECIAL	FLACCO AND SANDMAN SPECIAL	Gadflys, Gadflys and Paul McDermott ("Welcome To Stupidville")
14	5 August 1999	Rebecca Barnard, Greg Fleet	Alyssa-Jane Cook, Peter Berner	Karma County, Catatonia, Paul McDermott, Rebecca Barnard and Jimmy Little ("Under The Milky Way")
15	12 August 1999	Marcia Hines, Matt King	Tasma Walton, Mark Trevorrow	Placebo, Marcia Hines, Mark Trevorrow and Paul McDermott ("It's Cold Outside" and "I Got The Music in Me")
16	19 August 1999	Jodie J Hill, Anthony Morgan	Gabby Millgate, Anthony Field	Gadflys, Diana Ah Naid, Paul McDermott ("Too Beautiful")
17	26 August 1999	BEST BITS SPECIAL	BEST BITS SPECIAL	
18	2 September 1999	BEST BITS SPECIAL	BEST BITS SPECIAL	
19	9 September 1999	Yvette Duncan, Glenn Tilbrook	Corinne Grant, Hugh Jackman	Gadflys, Glenn Tilbrook
20	16 September 1999	Tanya Bulmer, Barry Crocker	Gretel Killeen, Gus Kennett	Deadstar, Barry Crocker and Front End Loader, Paul McDermott ("Happiness")
21	22 September 1999	Pippa Grandison, Matt King	Bijou Phillips, Mark Trevorrow	Gadflys, Bijou Phillips, Pollyanna, Mark Trevorrow
22	30 September 1999	Jodie J Hill, Travis Demsey	Alyssa-Jane Cook, Rhys Muldoon	Ben Lee, Gadflys, Paul McDermott ("Perfect Day")
23	7 October 1999	Kim Hope, Toby Allen	Amanda Keller, Ben Lee	Gadflys, Human Nature, Fiona Horne, Ben Lee
24	14 October 1999	Tanya Bulmer, Jimeoin	Fiona Horne, Adam Couper	The Cruel Sea, The Tea Party, Stella One Eleven
25	21 October 1999	Jodie J Hill, Mark Lizotte	Hattie Hayridge, Steven Gates	Gadflys, Tripod, Fastball, Mark Lizotte
26	28 October 1999	Ingrid Ruiz, Steve Kearney	Colin Lane, Frank Woodley	Killing Heidi, Steve Abbott (as The Sandman)
27	4 November 1999	Emma Tom, Dave McCormack	Gabby Millgate, Craig McLaughlin	Custard, Paul Kelly and Uncle Bill, The Whitlams,
28	11 November 1999	Melinda Schneider, Matt King	Sacha Horler, Mark Trevorrow	Alex Lloyd, Taxiride, Mark Trevorrow and Melinda Schneider, Paul McDermott ("Bottle")
29	18 November 1999	Andrea Powell, Richard Fidler	Gretel Killeen, Greg Sullivan	Jebediah, Fuel, Kasey Chambers, Paul McDermott ("Everything And More")
30	25 November 1999	Natalie Jackson Mendoza, Adam Hills	Amanda Keller, Jimmy Barnes	Gadflys, Jimmy Barnes, Natalie Jackson Mendoza, Cast Performance ("Sad Fuckers of the World")

== Good News Week Debates (1999–2000) ==
Air Date	Topic	Master of Ceremonies	Affirmative	Negative
23 August 1999	Happy Days Are Here Again	Mikey Robins	Paul McDermott, Amanda Keller, Rich Hall	Rod Quantock, Jean Kittson, Anthony Morgan
6 September 1999	All's Fair in Love And War	Margaret Scott	Rich Hall, Lynn Ferguson, Phil Kay	Paul McDermott, Julie McCrossin, Mikey Robins
6 June 2000	Love Makes The World Go Around	Rod Quantock	Rove McManus, Margaret Smith, Ross Noble	Paul McDermott, Julie McCrossin, Mikey Robins
13 June 2000	Bigger Is Better	Julie McCrossin	Judith Lucy, Dave O'Neil, Stewart Lee	Paul McDermott, Jean Kittson, Boothby Graffoe
5 September 2000	Always Look on the Bright Side of Life	Kerri-Anne Kennerley	Rove McManus, Corrine Grant, James O'Loghlin	Paul McDermott, Julie McCrossin, Mikey Robins
12 September 2000	The Olympics Are Fools Gold	Paul McDermott	James O'Loghlin, Kitty Flanagan, Mikey Robins	Peter Berner, Gabby Milgate, Tony Squires
10 October 2000	Science Should Get Out of Our Genes	Richard Fidler	Paul McDermott, Jean Kittson, Dave Hughes	Adam Spencer, Julie McCrossin, Rod Quantock
17 October 2000	Sex Is Never Safe	Sophie Lee	Paul McDermott, Julie McCrossin, Mikey Robins	Adam Hills, Gretel Killeen, Justin Melvey

== Good News Week: The Closing Ceremony (2000) ==
Air Date	Mikey's Team	Julie's Team	Musical Performances
21 November 2000	Tanya Bulmer, Richard Fidler, Rhys Muldoon, Rove McManus, Kate Fischer, Natasha Stott Despoja, James O'Loghlin	Johanna Griggs, Amanda Keller, Mark Trevorrow, Corinne Grant, Peter Berner, Wil Anderson, Rod Quantock	Anastacia, Gadflys, Paul McDermott and Mark Trevorrow ("That's Life"), Paul McDermott and Cast ("Canberra Boy/GNW Says Goodnight")

== Good News World (2011) ==
Paul McDermott, Mikey Robins, Claire Hooper, Cal Wilson, Akmal, Sammy J, Randy, and Tom Gleeson appear in every episode.

No. in Season	Air Date	Additional Cast	Musical Performances
1	5 September 2011		Paul McDermott ("Tony Abbott")
2	12 September 2011	Julia Morris	Sammy J and Randy ("John Howard")
3	19 September 2011	Julia Morris	Paul McDermott, Sammy J and Randy ("Mother Nature")
4	26 September 2011		Sammy J and Randy ("Twitter Song")
5	3 October 2011		Sammy J and Randy ("Finals Fever")
6	10 October 2011		Sammy J and Randy ("R.E.M. (Lullaby)")
7	17 October 2011		Sammy J and Randy ("He's Only Fourteen")
8	24 October 2011	Corinne Grant	Sammy J and Randy ("The Economy")
9	31 October 2011	Julia Morris	Sammy J and Randy ("The Queen")
10	7 November 2011		Sammy J and Randy ("Population")
11	14 November 2011		Sammy J and Randy ("Yellow Pages Song")
12	21 November 2011		Sammy J and Randy ("Good Times")
13	29 November 2011	Robbie McGregor	Sammy J and Randy ("Aussie Christmas")
