= List of Good News Week recurring segments =

This is an incomplete list of recurring segments featured on the Australian satirical game show Good News Week. Each episode usually consists of four to five of these recurring segments plus the regular segment of Strange But True.

== Strange But True ==
In Strange But True, each team is given three clues regarding a "strange but true" news story. The clues are presented in the second round of the show and then revisited in the final round, when the teams must use the clues to determine the story. The first two clues are represented by props, with Robins often forced to wear a humiliating headpiece, mask or costume as his clue. The final clue is a song performed by one of the panellists, a special musical guest act or occasionally McDermott. In the initial presentation of the clues, only a verse and chorus is performed. When revisiting the clues later in the show the song is performed in full, sometimes as a whole musical routine involving other team members or the whole cast.

== Panel segments ==
Panel segments, listed in alphabetical order, involve games that encourage discussion about possible answers amongst team members. The first round of the show is usually a panel segment.

=== 3-And-A-Half Corners ===
3-And-A-Half Corners involves questions about news from around the world.

=== 5 Second Grab ===
In 5 Second Grab, news stories must be identified from a short quote.

=== 7 Days In 7 Seconds ===
In 7 Days In 7 Seconds, teams are shown a quick montage of seven stories from the week. The teams alternate identifying each story until the seventh story which is thrown open to the fastest responding team. At the end of the segment the images from the montage collect on screen as McDermott recounts each story, often obscuring his face as a running gag. In the 2009 finale, the game was played as 12 Months In 7 Seconds using stories from the year.

=== A Thousand Words ===
A Thousand Words involves each team offering their best captions for images from the week's news.

=== Animal Magnetism ===
In Animal Magnetism, each team is shown three images of different animals that they must match to three images of various objects or people to illustrate a story from the week's news.

=== Buzz Words ===
In Buzz Words, teams are required to elaborate on a given term or phrase relating to news from the week.

=== Giving Headline ===
Giving Headline involves identifying news stories from their newspaper headline.

=== Limericks ===
In Limericks, news stories are presented in the form of a limerick.

=== Name Game ===
In Name Game, McDermott asks each panel member a question where the answer is somebody's name.

=== Newsflash ===
Newsflash, previously named Fast Money, is played against a timer, where teams alternate answering questions about stories of the week until the last question which is thrown open to either team.

=== Spot The Bull ===
In Spot The Bull, each team is presented with a news story and must identify which of three quotes was the one actually said. A video clip of the person quoted is played to reveal the correct answer.

=== Survey Says ===
Survey Says is a multiple choice game where each team must identify the correct finding from a conducted survey.

=== Warren ===
In Warren, each team is given three headlines regarding the same subject, but its identity has been concealed by the name “Warren”. In this segment, the audience cries “Warren!” following Paul's explanation of the game.

=== What's The Story? ===
In What's The Story, each team is shown a series of clips and images from a news story of the week that they must identify.

== Individual segments ==
These games, listed in alphabetical order, are played by an individual panellist, or occasionally a specially appearing non-panellist guest, on behalf of their team and usually away from the panel desk. Panellists sometimes play against an opposing team panellist, or are individually quizzed by McDermott. Games from individual segments are typically less news-oriented than the games from panel segments, and as such are more suitable for international guests who are unlikely to be up to date with Australian news.

=== Blow Up Your Pants ===
Blow Up Your Pants, previously named Scattegories, where the panellist enters an apparently sound-proof booth in which pieces of paper each printed with a letter are blown around the booth. The panellist must catch a letter and is asked questions where all answers must begin with that letter. Questions usually refer to both news of the week and random trivia.

=== Border Insecurity ===
Border Insecurity, a game specifically for international guests, is a quiz about Australian culture.

=== Buzzers Of Death ===
In Buzzers Of Death, a panellist from each team competes against the other in the news topic of bizarre, unique deaths or accidents regarding people who "remove themselves from the gene pool in very special ways" by pressing their buzzers, which trigger a small explosion in the ends of two broken wires held by McDermott. The only rule of the game is that buzzers cannot be pressed until each multiple choice answer is listed, although panellists often violate this rule much to McDermott's frustration. At the end of the segment, McDermott brings the broken ends of the wires together, setting off a chain of explosions that usually ends with the destruction of a part of the set or injury to McDermott.

=== Couch Potato ===
In Couch Potato, a panellist from each team sits on a lounge chair and is interviewed by McDermott in a mock psychiatrist-type session. The first part of the interview consists of a word association, followed by McDermott suggesting to “go a little deeper” with more structured questions.

=== Clash Of The Titans ===
Clash Of The Titans is a game where a panellist from each team face off over questions about the news or general knowledge, crying out their own name as their buzzer. However, panellists often challenge this rule, resulting in the use of nicknames to match up the number of syllables in each panellist's buzzer (as with “Wardo” and “Scottie” in a round between Felicity Ward and Denise Scott), or comically long names and words (such as Adam Spencer's use of “Adam Barrington Spencer” or Colin Lane's “disestablishmentarianism”).

=== Dishing The Dirt ===
In Dishing The Dirt, the panellist is given two possible answers for questions regarding entertainment, gossip and other tabloid news.

=== Know Your Enemy ===
Know Your Enemy involves a panellist from each team facing off over questions about their opponent, which have been referenced from Wikipedia.

=== Little Pricks ===
In Little Pricks, a panellist from each team face off over questions regarding news or general knowledge to throw darts at a wall of balloons, which contains four images of well-known people at the centre. Points are awarded for identifying the person in each image.

=== Magazine Mastermind ===
In Magazine Mastermind, a panellist from each team is given a magazine on an obscure topic to study before the show, then must answer questions about the subject.

=== So You Think You Can Mime ===
So You Think You Can Mime, previously named Bad Street Theatre, requires the panellist to mime a news story from the week to their team which is often quite unusual for additional comedic impact. The name of the game refers to the dance show So You Think You Can Dance.

=== Target Of Opportunity ===
In Target Of Opportunity, the panellist from each team are shown images of people making news and discuss the stories in a critical manner.

=== Up Cut ===
Up Cut requires the panellist to rearrange words on a magnet board to make three headlines from the news of the week.

=== Would You Believe ===
In Would You Believe, the panellist must guess which of the three news stories recounted by the opposing panel members is true. The panellist may ask questions, to which the person possessing the real story must answer truthfully while the others are permitted to lie.

=== What Would An Idiot Say? ===
What Would an Idiot Say?, previously named Are You Stupider Than A 5th Grader? is a game where the panellist is given a question from a quiz show and three “superbly dumb” answers, of which one the panellist must identify was actually given as an answer by a contestant.

== Group segments ==
Group segments, listed in alphabetical order, involve games where all six panellists participate without formal team division or scoring.

=== 7 Things For The Bin ===
In 7 Things For The Bin, panellists sit around a rubbish bin and rant about a news story which they never want to hear of again, then “bin” the story by throwing their magazine and newspaper props into the bin. However, this often extends to any topic annoying the panellist. Despite its name, McDermott only occasionally contributes a seventh “thing” for the bin.

=== Hot Spot ===
In Hot Spot, McDermott stands amongst the audience and asks the panellists on stage questions about the news of the week, to which they must respond with witty one-liners while standing on a large yellow spot.

== Special segments ==
These games, listed in alphabetical order, are typically one-off occurrences designed for special guests or occasions.

=== Good News Week Kitchen ===
Good News Week Kitchen required each team to identify newsmakers from the week as represented by different food dishes, played for the occasion of MasterChef Australia judges Matt Preston and George Calombaris appearing as panellists.

=== Making Your Mark ===
Making Your Mark was a quiz about the environment and sustainability, played for the occasion of Making Your Mark week, Network Ten's environmental initiative.

=== Political Mastermind ===
Political Mastermind involved a quiz about Australian political history, played for the occasion of a special guest appearance by then Prime Minister Kevin Rudd.

=== Sporting Mastermind ===
Sporting Mastermind was a sport-themed quiz, played for the occasion of the 2010 Commonwealth Games.

=== The Great Debate ===
In The Great Debate, teams captains Mikey Robins and Claire Hooper portrayed opposition leader Tony Abbott and Prime Minister Julia Gillard, respectively, and responded to questions on party policies asked by McDermott in a parody of the 2010 leaders debate. On a second occasion, leaders were portrayed by panellists Peter Berner and Corinne Grant.

== See also ==
- Good News Week
- List of Good News Week episodes
- List of Good News Week spin-off series episodes
