= Def FX =

Australian band

- Also known as: Definition FX
- Origin: Sydney, New South Wales, Australia
- Genres: Electronic rock; industrial rock; Alternative Dance
- Years active: 1990–1997, 2012–2013, 2019, 2023
- Labels: Phantom; RCA; EMI; Cicada; MCA; Grudge
- Past members: Martyn Basha; Blake Gardner; Fiona Horne; Sean Lowry; Larry Van Kriedt; Dave Stein; Charlie McMahon; Peter Tasker; Sean Fonti; Ant Banister; Sian Williams

Def FX were an Australian electronic rock band formed in 1990 by keyboardist Sean Lowry. Members included Fiona Horne on lead vocals, Blake Gardiner on guitar and Martyn Basha on bass. They released four albums between 1992 and 1996 before disbanding in April 1997. For United States releases and touring, the band used the name Definition FX to avoid confusion with similarly named groups.

Def FX's music included elements of electronic dance music, grunge and pop. Basha and Horne resurrected the band for touring in 2012 and 2013.

== History ==
Def FX were formed in 1990 in Sydney with the line-up of Martyn Basha on bass guitar, Blake Gardner on lead guitar (both ex-Bezerk), Fiona Horne on lead vocals (ex-Mothers) and Sean Lowry on record player with a padlock on it, sequencers and samples (ex-King Prawn). According to Australian musicologist, Ian McFarlane, their "intention from the outset was to mix energetic dance beats with hardcore grungy rock ... equall[ing] a spiralling, trance-inducing blast of electronic dance music." Larry Van Kriedt was a "hidden fifth member" on saxophone and sequencers (ex-AC/DC, Non Stop Dancers); he "also co-wrote much of the band's early material."

Def FX's debut release was a four-track extended play, Water, in June 1991 via Phantom Records. It featured the song, "Surfers of the Mind", which Joanna Palmer of Tharunka described as "a violent whirlpool of high-voltage house metal where [Horne] puts her larynx through a militant aerobic workout, while the cool delivery of [Lowry]'s 21st century gospel raps around her." The track appeared on national radio station, Triple J's listeners' poll for 1991. They toured Australia, and promoted it with the band's first music video. Water was produced by Nick Mainsbridge. At the ARIA Music Awards of 1992 the EP was nominated for Best Independent Release and Producer of the Year.

They followed with a second EP, Surge, in November, which included the track, "Under the Blue". A third EP, Blink (June 1992), included the track, "Sex Game Sucker". Gardner was replaced on guitar by Dave Stein late in 1992. Lowry summarised the group's attitude to signing with a major label, "It was always important to stay independent long enough to set the parameters of the band, so that anyone who came on board would be clear what the band was like and how it should be marketed."

Their first album, Light Speed Collision, was released in November 1992 in a vinyl-only format via Phantom Records; it appeared in CD format through EMI in the following February. The album included guest vocals by New Zealand pop singer, Margaret Urlich. For its United States version, on RCA/BMG in June 1993, the band used the name, Definition FX, to avoid confusion with a US band, Das EFX. They reordered the tracks and added material from two of their EPs. Lowry explained to Nic Haygarth of The Canberra Times that "People get the misconception that because we're a technology-based band we do a lot of our work and development of songs in the studio, but I suppose what we do there is attempt to transfer the live show to record, and we might put up a very rough mock-up of a song and start playing it."

The second album, Baptism, released in 1993, is a compilation of three Australian-released EPs Water, Surge and Blink as well as a 12-inch single, "Surfers of the Mind". Baptism featured the track, "Make Your Stash", which is apparently so rare that Horne had no idea of its existence when presented it for autographing by a dedicated Def FX fan. The single was rather atypical of Def FX, in that it had no cover art and no B-sides, which had characterised their EPs. The band usually preferred to make each release, be it album or EP, a conceptual work that made full use of the compact disc format that had recently come into commercial prominence. At the ARIA Music Awards of 1993 Blink was nominated for Best Independent Release.

Three more EPs followed No Time for Nowhere (March 1993), Space Time Disco (June) and Post Moronic (September 1994). At the end of 1993 Basha had departed and his duties on bass guitar were taken up by Van Kriedt. Post Moronic appeared on the ARIA Singles Chart in the top 50. One of its tracks, "Masses Like Asses", was listed on the Triple J Hottest 100, 1994.

Ritual Eternal (1995), their third album, is more experimental: including tracks without standard guitars and others with Charlie McMahon on didgeridoo (ex-Gondwanaland Project), who also joined Def FX on tour. It was recorded and produced almost entirely by Lowry, following the cancellation of their contract with EMI, and was issued via independent label Cicada Music and distributed by MDS. McFarlane felt the CD was "over-ambitious". Ritual Eternal introduced their new bass guitarist, Peter Tasker, who was forced out of the band months later and replaced by Sean Fonti (ex-Massappeal, Caligula). At the ARIA Music Awards of 1995 they were nominated for Best Independent Release for their third album.

In October 1995 they issued the EP, Psychoactive Summer, which also reached the top 50 on the ARIA Charts. It was followed by their fourth album, Majick, in mid-year, which peaked at No. 21 on the ARIA Albums Chart. It provided four singles. The band dissolved in May of that year with the split announced by Horne on ABC-TV's Saturday morning youth variety show, Recovery.

=== Post-break-up and reunions ===
Fiona Horne followed Def FX with musical releases 'Shut Up and Kiss Me' with Paul McDermott and a solo single "Let's Go Out Tonight" (both achieving chart success) before subsequently become a writer, with 15 books including one autobiography, and two oracle decks. Her books explore the subject of Modern Witchcraft. She is an actress, as well as a performer in reality television as both host and contestant; she used to appear on the Hamish and Andy radio programme. In March 2007 Horne released her first solo CD, Witch Web, based on her spiritual practice.

Sean Lowry completed his Ph.D in 2003 at the University of Sydney. Lowry is now an academic, writer and visual artist. Sean Fonti formed Primary with brother Jamie Fonti, also from Caligula, and vocalist Connie Mitchell.

With Horne and Basha as the sole original members, Def FX reunited and embarked on a national tour in May–June 2012, performing in east coast state capitals. Joining the pair were electronic musician Ant Banister (Clan Analogue) on keyboard and vocals and Wiley Cochrane on guitar, as well as an appearance by Jesse Basha (son of bassist Martyn Basha). From October to November 2013 they reformed again to play shows in Adelaide, Melbourne, Newcastle, Sydney and Brisbane. More recently in 2019 they reformed again for a sold out east coast Australia tour, with new Bassist from bands, Sounds Like Winter, True Love Choas, Sian(FTB) Wiliams, In 2023, they reformed for another east coast tour.

Horne formed rock band SEAWITCH, playing guitar, singing and as songwriter in 2020, with former Hellmenn guitarist Dave Hopkins. SEAWITCH released five videos in two years, one self-titled EP and their debut album, Well of Spells, released on the Cheersquad Label on 30 October 2022 debuted at Number 2 on the AIR Record Chart.

== Discography ==
=== Albums ===
List of albums, with Australian chart positions
Title	Album details	Peak chart positions
Title	Album details	AUS
Light Speed Collision	Released: November 1992; Label: EMI Music (7807562); Format: CD, LP	96
Baptism	Released: November 1993; Label: Phantom Records (PHCD29); Format: CD	160
Ritual Eternal	Released: 1995; Label: Cicada Music (EEEP-001CD); Format: CD	-
Majick	Released: 1996; Label: Grudge MCD (73015); Format: CD	21

=== Extended Plays ===
List of EPs, with Australian chart positions
Title	EP details	Peak chart positions
Title	EP details	AUS
Water	Released: June 1991; Label: Phantom Records (PHMCD-9); Format: CD, 12" LP	149
Surge	Released: November 1991; Label: Phantom Records (PHMCD-12); Format: CD, 12" LP	88
Blink	Released: June 1992; Label: Phantom Records (PH12CD-52); Format: CD, 12" LP	71
Post Moronic	Released: September 1994; Label: EMI (8740552); Format: CD	43
Kill the Real Girls	Released: August 1995; Label: Cicada Music (EEEP006CDEP); Format: CD	
Psychoactive Summer	Released: October 1995; Label: Cicada Music (MCAAD 6666); Format: CD	42

==== Singles ====
Year	Title	AUS	Album
1993	"No Time for Nowhere"	67	Light Speed Collision
1993	"Space Time Disco"	70	Light Speed Collision
1993	"Something Inside (No Time for Nowhere)"	-	
1996	"Spell on You"	51	Majick
1996	"I'll Be Your Majick"	67	Majick
1996	"Deja Vu"/"Headfuck"	112	Majick

== Awards and nominations ==
=== ARIA Music Awards ===
The ARIA Music Awards are a set of annual ceremonies presented by Australian Recording Industry Association (ARIA), which recognise excellence, innovation, and achievement across all genres of the music of Australia. They commenced in 1987.

Year	Nominee / work	Award	Result	Ref.
1992	Water	Best Independent Release	Nominated	
