= Watching the World =

Watching the World may refer to:

- A song by Chaka Khan
- A song by Mr. Mister
- An album and a song by Primary (band)
