= Elizabeth Hays =

American astrophysicist

Elizabeth Anne Hays is an American astrophysicist at the NASA Goddard Space Flight Center, where she is chief of the Astroparticle Physics Laboratory and the project scientist for the Fermi Gamma-ray Space Telescope. Her research has included gamma-ray astronomy of the Crab Nebula, novae, and gamma-ray bursts.

== Education and career ==
Hays majored in physics at Cornell University, graduating in 1999. She completed her Ph.D. in 2004 at the University of Maryland, College Park, under the supervision of Greg Sullivan.

After postdoctoral research at the University of Chicago and Argonne National Laboratory, she joined the NASA Goddard Space Flight Center in 2007. She became the project scientist for the Fermi telescope in 2019.

== Recognition ==
In 2014, Hays was named a Fellow of the American Physical Society (APS), after a nomination from the APS Division of Astrophysics, "for her discovery of high energy gamma-ray flares from the Crab nebula in Fermi data and her major contributions to the success of Fermi".
