= Craig Hill (comedian) =

Scottish comedian

Craig Hill is a Scottish comedian, TV presenter and actor known for his cheeky, irreverent and camp act.

== Biography ==
Hill's first public success came at age ten when he won a local talent contest in his native East Kilbride, impersonating Cleo Laine. In 1991, he moved to Edinburgh in order to study drama at Queen Margaret University College, graduating in 1994. Hill's comedy characters as well as his ability to improvise and write material led him into stand-up. He was still an actor, working in Theatre in Education and pantomimes when a friend secretly booked him in for an 'open spot' in 1998.

In 1997 and 1998, Hill performed a lead role (Jeremy Weller) in the Grassmarket Project's theatre production "Mad" at the Edinburgh Fringe.

Since 2002, Hill has extensively toured with his solo comedy shows throughout Scotland, Ireland and the UK. His international work includes Montreal's Just For Laughs Festival 2008 where he hosted the prestigious Britcom series as well as Bubbling With Laughter and shows in Toronto, Paris, Madrid, Barcelona, Melbourne, Perth, Adelaide, Sydney, New York, Singapore, Amsterdam, Brussels, Ghent, Athens, Stockholm and Berlin. He previously hosted Edinburgh's Hogmanay coverage for the BBC and from 2011–2016 has been the host of the Inverness Hogamanay Street Party "Red Hot Highland Fling" on 31 December to bring on the new year. In 2017 he made his Glastonbury Festival debut and 2018 saw his 20th year of performing at the Edinburgh Festival Fringe.

== Selected work ==
=== Edinburgh Festival Fringe seasons and touring shows ===
- 1999 Three Weird Beards, (fringe debut as part of Scottish triple bill, Gilded Balloon)
- 2000 Craig Hill’s Alive with the Sound of Music, (Gilded Balloon)
- 2001 Craig Hill’s Wiz To Oz, (Gilded Balloon)
- 2002 Craig Hill – The People’s Friend, (Assembly Rooms)
- 2003 Craig Hill – Live!, (Assembly Rooms)
- 2004 Craig Hill – One Man & His Kilt!, (Pod Deco + touring)
- 2005 Craig Hill’s Got the Ballroom, (Assembly Rooms + touring)
- 2006 Craig Hill – Kilty Pleasures, (Assembly Rooms + touring)
- 2007 Craig Hill – Makin' A Big Song & Dance, (Assembly Universal Theatre + touring)
- 2008 Craig Hill Makes Your Whole Week!, (Gilded Balloon + touring)
- 2009 Craig Hill – 40 Love…?, (Gilded Balloon + touring)
- 2010 Craig Hill – Why Don’t You Come Down the Front?!, (Gilded Balloon + touring)
- 2011 Craig Hill – Blown By a Fan, (Underbelly, Bristo Square + touring)
- 2012 Craig Hill – Jock’s Trap!, (Underbelly, Bristo Square + touring)
- 2013 Craig Hill – Tartan About!, (Underbelly, Bristo Square + touring)
- 2014 Craig Hill – Give Him an Inch..., (Underbelly, Bristo Square + touring)
- 2015 Craig Hill – Playing with My Selfie!, (EICC Edinburgh International Conference Centre + touring)
- 2016 Craig Hill – Up and Coming!, (EICC Edinburgh International Conference Centre + touring)
- 2017 Craig Hill – Someone's Gonna Get Kilt!, (EICC Edinburgh International Conference Centre + touring)
- 2018 Craig Hill – C'Mon the Lads!, (EICC Edinburgh International Conference Centre + touring)
- 2019 Craig Hill: Bottoms Up!, (EICC Edinburgh International Conference Centre + touring)
- 2021 Craig Hill: Pumped!, (EICC Edinburgh International Conference Centre + touring)
- 2022 Craig Hill: I Always Knew I Had it in Me!, (Just the Tonic)
- 2023 Craig Hill: This Gets Harder Every Year!, (Just the Tonic)
- 2024 Craig Hill: I've Been Sitting On This For A While!, (Just the Tonic)
- 2025 Craig Hill – This Gets Harder Every Year!, (Just the Tonic)

=== Radio ===
- 2002 Craig Hill’s Passionate Encounters (presenter, BBC Radio Scotland)
- 2002 Famous for Five Minutes (host, comedy quiz, BBC Radio Scotland)

=== Television ===
- 1998 – Edinburgh or Bust, (Featured artist, Channel 4)
- 2001 – Ralf Little's Edinburgh Nights, (guest, BBC Scotland)
- 2001 – T in the Park, (roving reporter & anchor, BBC Scotland & BBC2 coverage of the live music festival)
- 2002 – 2003 series I, II & III Live Floor Show, (featured weekly artist, BBC Scotland comedy programme)
- 2002 – Music Live, (festival for Queen's jubilee celebrations, live-to-air co-presenter, BBC Scotland)
- 2002 – T in the Park, (roving reporter & anchor, BBC Scotland & BBC2 coverage of the live music festival)
- 2003 – Melbourne Comedy Festival Live, (Host, Channel 9, Australia)
- 2010 – Rove, (live-t-air performance, Network Ten Australia)
- 2003 – Hogmanay Live 2003, (live-to-air presenter from Edinburgh for BBC 1's New Year's show)
- 2003 – T in the Park, (roving reporter & anchor, BBC Scotland & BBC2 coverage of the live music festival)
- 2004 – Floor Show, (featured weekly artist & presenter, BBC2 comedy programme)
- 2004 – T in the Park, (roving reporter & anchor, BBC Scotland & BBC2 coverage of the live music festival)
- 2005 – Craig Hill's Out Tonight, (presenter, BBC Scotland chat, entertainment and comedy show)
- 2005 – Edinburgh Fringe with Dara O'Briain, (guest, STV)
- 2005 – Hissy Fits, (guest, Channel 4)
- 2005 – The 10 Commandments of Political Correctness, (contributor, Sky1)
- 2005 – BBC'S Children in Need, (guest, BBC Scotland)
- 2008 – Just For Laughs, (CBC TV gala at the Montreal Comedy Festival)
- 2009 – The Scots factor, (STV)
- 2010 – Good News Week, (panellist, Network Ten Australia)
- 2010 – Spics & Specs, (panellist, Network Ten Australia)
- 2011-2014 – Cracker Night, (hosting & guest spots, assorted Australian channels)
- 2018 – Impossible, (BBC One)

=== Short film ===
- Lay of the Land (supporting role, Producer: Screenbase; Director: Fraser McDonald; 1998)
