= Australia You're Standing In It =

- Genre: Comedy
- Country of origin: Australia
- Original language: English
- No. of episodes: 15

Production
- Running time: 30 minutes

Original release
- Network: ABC
- Release: 1 September 1983 – 1984

Australia You're Standing In It is an Australian sketch comedy series produced by the Australian Broadcasting Corporation, first screened in September 1983 with a second series screened in September 1984. In honour of the 30th Anniversary of the show, the complete series was released on DVD on 13 March 2013.

== Cast ==
- Rod Quantock
- Mary Kenneally
- Stephen Blackburn
- Geoff Brooks
- Sue Ingleton
- Evelyn Krape
- Tim Robertson (Series 1)
- Peter Browne (Series 2)

== Format ==
Australia You're Standing In It featured many recurring sketches and characters that parodied well known personalities, pop stars, music videos, television programs and advertisements of the day, or simply sent-up well-known social situations. These included:

- Two pretentious society matrons (Ingleton and Kenneally) and a third (Krape) who could never quite make the grade much to the delight of the other two who mocked her. Catchphrase: "Helloo Daaaahlings!"
- The Dodgy Brothers (Blackburn and Brooks), two badly dressed and dim businessmen who appeared in low-budget and badly produced television advertisements selling their dodgy products. Partly a parody of the then ubiquitous advertisements for the Saba furniture warehouse, and other cut-rate advertisements of its ilk.
- "Brainspace", a new-age segment presented by Tim and Debbie (Kenneally and Blackburn), whose convoluted and pretentious talk was a smokescreen for their ignorance. Their main catchphrase was "Amaaazing!"
- Mock advertisements for fictional product "Chunky Custard". Most of these were parodies of familiar contemporary advertisements for real products, mimicking current commercials for such products as Big M or Four'N Twenty Pies. Halfway through the second series Chunky Custard was phased out and replaced by "Hot Yak Fat", which came in a can resembling a beer can. Viewers were exhorted to "crack a Fat today" (a play on a common Australian slang term for a penile erection).
- Many parodies of popular songs and music videos, including Mary Kenneally as Bonnie Tyler in "Total Eclipse of the Brain".
- Bruce Rump (Brooks), a parody of Bruce Ruxton. Rump always ended his skits with "And that's why we should keep the bloody flag the same! Now clear out!"
- Rod Quantock in stand-up routines in which he would address the audience directly. In one episode he attempted to put Victorian viewers to sleep by hypnotizing them with an Australian Rules football.
- "Fair Cops".
- The Catalogue Collectors, a pair of scarf-clad Melburnians who lived in a caravan next to Port Phillip and collected catalogues. Catchphrase: "Home is where the front door is."

== Spinoffs ==
- For a short time Tim and Debbie hosted Reel To Real on the ABC, in which the pair presented old B-movies (e.g., The Boy with Green Hair) and proceeded to interrupt, deconstruct, and generally mock them in voice-over as the movie screened.
- A long-playing record of most of the Tim and Debbie sketches was released under the title Brainspace, Vol. II. Another album, Australia - you're standing in it (Brainspace Vol III) followed in 1986.
- The Dodgy Brothers (again portrayed by Blackburn and Brooks) and Bruce Rump (Brooks) were resurrected in the later Fast Forward.

== Awards and nominations ==
=== ARIA Music Awards ===
The ARIA Music Awards are a set of annual ceremonies presented by Australian Recording Industry Association (ARIA), which recognise excellence, innovation, and achievement across all genres of the music of Australia. They commenced in 1987.

Year	Nominee / work	Award	Result	Ref.
1987	Australia You're Standing In It	Best Comedy Release	Nominated	

== See also ==
- Ratbags
- List of Australian television series
