= Eddie Ifft =

American comedian

- Born: Edward Charles Ifft III; March 14, 1971 (age 55); Pittsburgh, Pennsylvania, U.S.
- Occupation: Comedian
- Website: eddieifft.com

Eddie Ifft (born 1974 in Pittsburgh, Pennsylvania) is an American stand-up comedian, actor and writer.

== Biography ==
Ifft graduated with honors from Fox Chapel Area High School in 1990. After graduation from the University of Pittsburgh, where he was a brother of the Delta Tau Delta fraternity He then moved to New York City, New York, US, and commenced performing stand-up comedy on the club circuit.

=== Stand-up comedy ===
Ifft has performed on the comedy specials Comedy Central's Presents, NBC's Late Friday Night, BET's Comic View, ABC's Comics Unleashed, NBC's Last Comic Standing, and in July 2001 he performed at the Montreal Just for Laughs Festival in New Faces. In August 2008 he filmed his own 1/2 hour special for Comedy Central (Comedy Central Presents).

Ifft has performed in over 20 countries in theatres, clubs and television shows. In Australia he has been featured on Rove Live, The Glass House, The Footy Show, Stand Up Australia, Wil & Lehmo, The Sideshow, Thank God You're Here, Good News Week, The Circle, and Spicks and Specks.

In June 2007 he taped his first live DVD at the Sydney Opera House. He has recorded three live stand-up comedy specials: I Learned the Hard Way (2004), Jokes That Make My Friends Laugh (2006), and Live from Australia (2009), produced by Roof Top Comedy. The DVD, Eddie Ifft Live was recorded at the Sydney Opera House and was released in February 2011 by Punchline DVD. In 2012, Punchline DVD released, Ifft's follow-up DVD, "I Love Pussy".

=== Television ===
In 2006, Ifft moved from New York to Los Angeles where he still resides, developing sitcoms with networks. He starred in a pilot for Comedy Central, entitled Strap-On, and created a show for the FX Network while performing stand-up comedy on a nightly basis.

In 2013, Ifft guest-starred on the FX Network sitcom Legit, where he played a personal trainer that loses his way and falls into drugs, alcohol, and overeating. In order to play the part, Ifft had to undergo 3 hours of make-up to appear 40 pounds heavier.

=== Radio/ Podcasting ===
Ifft co-hosted the now-defunct New York City WNEW-FM morning show Sports Guys. He still appears regularly on nationwide radio shows, including KROQ-FM's Kevin and Bean Show, the Bob and Tom Show, and San Francisco's Alice 97.3 Morning Show with Sarah and Vinnie, and the WODCast Podcast, a Crossfit podcast.

== Achievements and awards ==
Ifft was one of five finalists in the 2006 MySpace/TBS "Stand-Up or Sit-Down" Competition. GQ Magazine featured 2 of Ifft's jokes in the Top 75 jokes of all time. He was awarded #10 and #39.
