= Cracker Night =

2009 Australian comedy TV series

- Genre: comedy
- Presented by: Julia Morris (2009), Craig Hill (2010), Stephen K. Amos (2011)
- Country of origin: Australia
- Original language: English
- No. of seasons: 7

Production
- Executive producer: Darren Chau,
- Producers: Elia Eliades & Jorge Menidis Sydney Comedy Festival
- Running time: 60 minutes (with commercials)
- Production companies: Total Show Productions, Foxtel

Original release
- Network: The Comedy Channel
- Release: 2009 – 2011

Cracker Night is an Australian comedy television gala event sponsored by the Comedy Channel, executive produced by the Comedy Channel programming director Darren Chau, and produced by Elia Eliades and Total Show Productions for the Comedy Channel as part of the Sydney Comedy Festival. The gala celebrates the opening of the Sydney Comedy Festival and showcases the best local and international talent performing at the festival that year.
