= Ratbags =

Ratbags is an Australian sketch comedy series which screened on Network Ten in 1981.

== Cast ==
- Rod Quantock
- Mary Kenneally
- Benny Gordon
- John Derum
- Adam Bowen
- Joanne Samuel
- Heather Mitchell
- Robyn Moase

== Format ==
Ratbags featured sketch comedy and parodies of well known personalities, pop stars, music videos, television programs and advertisements of the day, or simply sent-up well-known social situations. It also featured musical performances.

== See also ==
- Australia You're Standing In It
- List of Australian television series
