= Carl-Einar Häckner =

Swedish illusionist, actor and comedian

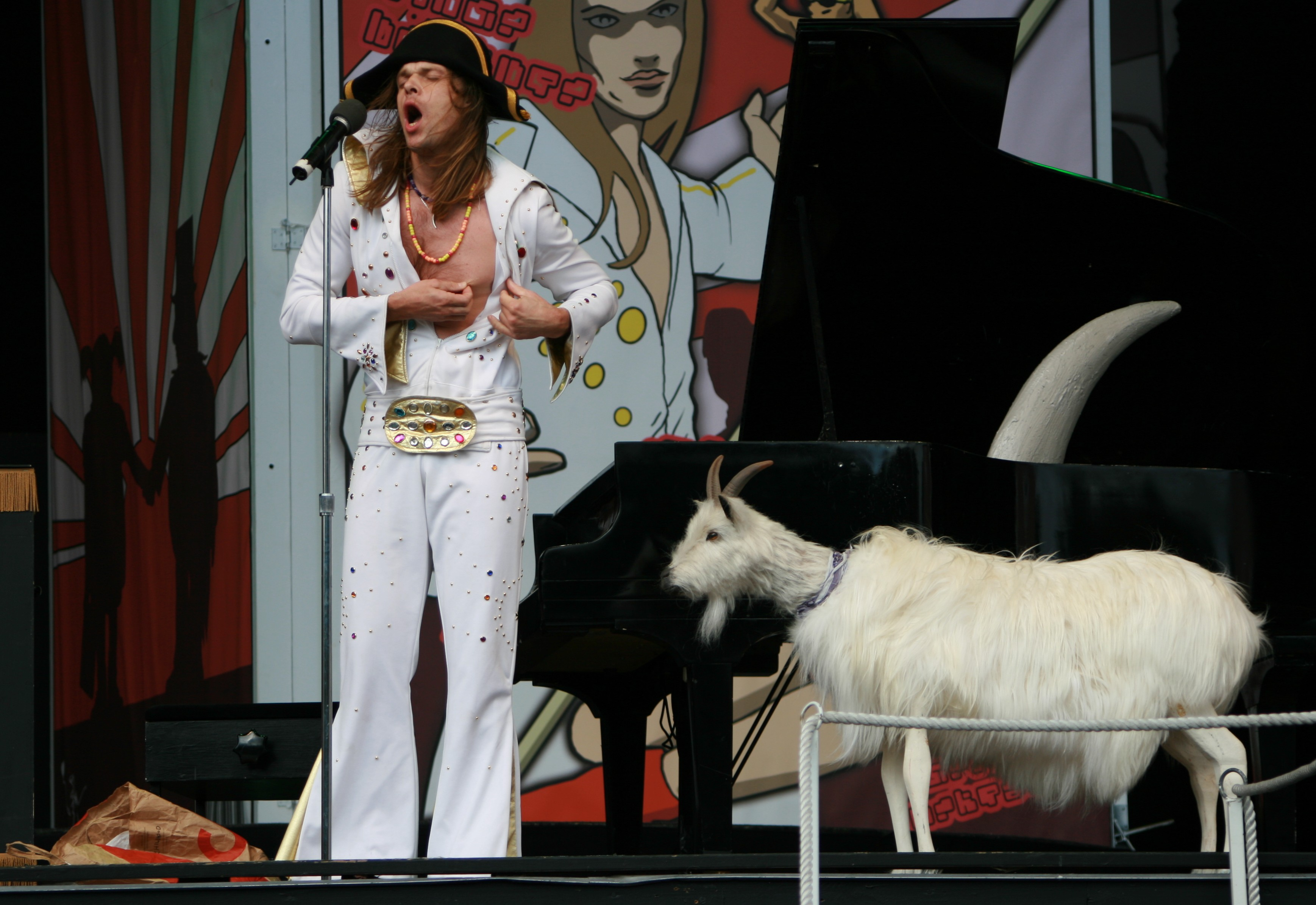
- Carl-Einar performing at Liseberg in July 2007
- Born: 8 October 1969 (age 56); Ale, Västra Götaland County
- Occupations: Illusionist, comedian
- Known for: Petri tårar, Herbert & Robert

Carl-Einar Häckner, also Charlie Häckner, (born 8 October 1969) is a Swedish illusionist, actor and comedian.

== Early life ==
Häckner was born in Nol, Ale Municipality, and raised in Gårdsten, Angered, a suburb of Gothenburg. He fell in love with magic during his early childhood after he received a magic set. At the age of eleven he held his first public performance. He met up with Max Milton, who became his mentor and influenced his artistic direction.

While Häckner was in upper secondary school he studied economics and when he finished, started a career as an illusionist under the name "Wic Mack".

== Career ==
Häckner has performed all across Sweden and abroad. He has performed in a long-running variety show at Liseberg in Gothenburg where acrobats and tightrope artists usually perform. The show has been running since 1996. In 1996 he was listed as Sweden's sexiest man alive.

In 1995 Häckner had a part in the film Petri tårar and a lead role as "Robert" in the TV series Herbert & Robert. In 2000 he took part in Galenskaparna och After Shaves variety show Jul Jul Jul.

In 2009/10 Häckner starred in La Clique at the Roundhouse in Camden, London, England.

In December 2010, Häckner returned to the Roundhouse as part of his solo show Carl-Einar Häckner: Big in Sweden. He also appeared at the Melbourne International Comedy Festival 2013, and appeared on Good News Week in a guitar sketch.
