= John Moloney (comedian) =

British comedian

For American comedian John Mulaney, please see John Mulaney.

John Moloney performing live at The Comedy Store in 2013

John Moloney is an English stand-up comedian of Irish descent.

A regular at London’s Comedy Store, Moloney has appeared at venues from Melbourne to Edinburgh. He appeared at the Just for Laughs and Halifax Festivals in Canada and Liffey Laughs in Dublin. Moloney hosts an annual fundraiser for ADCAF, a charity that works with abandoned and destitute children in India.

His BBC Radio 4 show The John Moloney Show was commissioned for a second series.

== Early life ==
Moloney grew up in Ilford with Irish parents. His father was from County Tipperary and his mother from County Kerry. When he was 14, he won the All Ireland Fleadh as an accordionist.

== Career ==
Moloney was a musician on the Red Wedge tour during the 1980s. As a member of a large Irish family in London, John learned the accordion. His first act on the comedy circuit was as the ‘angry young accordionist’. He slowly phased out the music and focused on stand-up.

John is best known for his performances on BBC’s The Stand Up Show and the most recent series of Grumpy Old Men. He was included in BBC Channel 4’s One Hundred Greatest Stand Ups in 2006. "One of the UK's most experienced stand ups, John Moloney epitomises dry, dispassionate delivery and is a master of the droll one liner. John Moloney has also worked with comedian Bill Bailey, most notably in Bill Bailey's stand up show Part Troll where he sings the "Hokey Cokey" in the style of German electronic band Kraftwerk, during the encore."

In 2010 Moloney returned to the Edinburgh Festival with his show Butterflies With Stretchmarks, which he then toured. In 2012 he co-produced the inaugural Balham Comedy Festival. In 2015 John's BBC Radio 4 show The John Moloney Show aired in May and June. It was featured on Pick of The Week, and Pick of the Year - Radio 4's flagship entertainment guide.

== Awards ==
Moloney was nominated as Best Live Stand Up at The British Comedy Awards in 1998, and twice won Best Live Performer at the London Comedy Festival.

In 2015 John won "Outstanding Achievement in British Comedy" at the UK Comedy Awards.

== Television ==
Credits include: The Stand Up Show (BBC1), Never Mind The Buzzcocks (BBC2), They Think It's All Over (BBC1), Not A Lot Of People Know That (BBC1), Call My Bluff (BBC1), Noel's Telly Years (BBC1), That's Showbusiness (BBC1), Pebble Mill (BBC1), Grumpy Old Men (BBC2), Best of Edinburgh Festival (BBC2), Good News Week (ABC), Spicks and Specks (ABC), Just For Laughs (CBC), Just For Laughs Roadshow (CBC), The World Stands Up (Channel Nine Australia) and The Comedy Store (Dave).

== Personal life ==
Moloney is a qualified teacher and taught French and German at a London school. He uses his language skills in his career and has performed in Hamburg and Berlin in German.
