= Floor Show =

Canadian music variety television series

- Presented by: Monty Hall
- Country of origin: Canada
- Original language: English
- No. of seasons: 1

Production
- Producer: Drew Crossan

Original release
- Network: CBC Television
- Release: 22 June – 13 July 1953

Floor Show is a Canadian music variety television series that aired on CBC Television in 1953.

== Premise ==
Monty Hall, a Toronto radio broadcaster in the 1950s, made his television debut as Floor Show's host. The series featured dance band music of that time with visiting artists such as Bobby Gimby and Mart Kenney accompanied by their bands.

== Production ==
Drew Crossan produced the series with CBC variety department chief Don Hudson as supervising producer. The set resembled a night club.

== Scheduling ==
The half-hour series was broadcast Mondays at 9:00 p.m. (Eastern) from 22 June to 13 July 1953.
