= Caligula (band) =

Australian band

- Origin: Sydney, New South Wales, Australia
- Genres: Techno, grunge
- Years active: 1989–1995, 2017–present
- Past members: Ashley Rothschild; James McKinnon; Dave Macken; Jamie Fonti; Sean Fonti; Mitchell Foley; Dave Ross

Caligula are an Australian band formed in Sydney in 1989, who produced electro rock music in the early 1990s. They released one studio album in 1994, Rubenesque, which peaked at number 13 on the ARIA album chart. Caligula toured with Depeche Mode, Pop Will Eat Itself, Ned's Atomic Dustbin, Ride, and Headless Chickens. The band reformed in 2017 and started recording and releasing new material in 2021.

== History ==
Caligula formed in Sydney in 1989 and were composed of five members: vocalist Ashley Rothschild, guitarist James McKinnon, drummer Dave Macken, Jamie Fonti (keyboards and backing singer), and bass guitarist Sean Fonti. The band also included Dave Ross and Mitchell Foley as founding members. In 1990 and 1991, the band released two EPs, before a compilation album including both EPs, titled Got One.

In 1994, they released their debut studio album Rubenesque and received national airplay on Triple J and Triple M with the song "Tears of a Clown" (Smokey Robinson & the Miracles cover) which reached #24 in the Australian singles chart.

Ashley Rothschild left Caligula, leading to their demise. The Fonti Brothers then created the band Primary with singer Connie Mitchell. Rothschild currently fronts the bands Panic Syndrome and Graveyard Rock Stars and teaches at Big Music Studios in Crows Nest.

In 2018 the band reunited to support Pop Will Eat Itself on the East Coast dates of their Australian tour.

== Discography ==
=== Albums ===
Title	Details	Peak chart positions
Title	Details	AUS
Got One	Released: 1991; Label: Timberyard Records (SAW 015); Format: CD; Compilation of Caligula and Got One EPs	-
Rubenesque	Released: March 1994; Label: Mercury, Phonogram (518994 2); Format: CD	13

=== EPs ===
Title	Details	Peak chart positions
Title	Details	AUS
Caligula	Released: 1990; Label: Timberyard Records (SAW012); Format: Vinyl	195
Got One	Released: 1991; Label: Timberyard Records (SAW015); Format: Vinyl	-
The Bluff	Released: August 1991; Label: Mercury (868971-2); Format: CD	96
I.C.U.	Released: April 1993; Label: Mercury (862043-2); Format: CD	55

=== Singles ===
Title	Year	Peak chart positions	Album
Title	Year	AUS	Album
"Check Point"	1992	-	The Bluff
"Tears of a Clown"	1993	25	Rubenesque
"Roundabout"	1994	64	Rubenesque
"So Fine (Why Can't You See?)"	1994	139	Rubenesque
"Fuzz"	1994	-	Rubenesque

== Awards ==
=== ARIA Music Awards ===
The ARIA Music Awards is an annual awards ceremony that recognises excellence, innovation, and achievement across all genres of Australian music. Caligula were nominated for one award.

Year	Nominee / work	Award	Result
1993	Caligula	Best New Talent	Nominated
