= Tony Woods (comedian) =

American comedian

Tony Woods is an American comedy writer and stand-up comedian known for being a mentor to Dave Chappelle and others. He was an original member of Russell Simmons' Def Comedy Jam and P. Diddy's Bad Boys of Comedy.

== Early life ==
Woods was born in New York, raised in Charlotte, North Carolina until he was seven, and moved to Washington D.C. when he was 10 years old. His teens were spent in Silver Spring, Maryland. He served in the Navy as a corpsman from 1989-1991 during Desert Storm. He has often said that if he hadn't been a comedian he would have been a dentist.

== Career ==
Woods did his first stand-up at the Comedy Cafe in Washington D.C. when he was 23 years old. Much of his earliest comedy work was on international stages, touring Europe and the Middle East.

Woods is a DC-area comedian who frequently performs observational comedy in what the New York Times calls "a laid-back, meditative style, a mellow brand of cool." He will frequently use wordplay and malapropisms to make points about larger issues. When Dave Chappelle won the Mark Twain Prize, Woods was the first person he thanked, saying that Woods "[did] it absolutely right." Woods says he does not have any particular style and his comedy doesn't have a formula. He frequently will not even write down the jokes for his performances.
