= Penny Cooper =

Canadian field hockey player

Personal information
- Born: April 7, 1969 (age 57) Vancouver, British Columbia
- Education: University of British Columbia

Sport
- Country: Canada
- Sport: Field hockey

Penny Cooper (born April 7, 1969) is a former Canadian Olympic field hockey player who was inducted into the University of British Columbia (UBC) sports hall of fame in 2013.

She competed at the 1988 Summer Olympics in Seoul, South Korea, alongside fellow UBC Sports Hall of Fame member Melanie Slade, where Canada finished in sixth place.

In 1988, she was also awarded the Harry Jerome Comeback Award for recovering from an unusual setback for injuries. Cooper made a remarkable recovery from a disabling ligament injury that threatened to eliminate her from athleticism.

While concurrently competing with the Women's National Team, Cooper also led the UBC team to “great success” from 1987 to 1992, including a Canadian Interuniversity Sport Championship in 1990, her graduating year.

She was named a Canada West All-Star in all but her first year; a second-team All Canadian in 1988; a first-team All Canadian in 1989 and 1990, and was voted to the Canadian Interuniversity Sport Championship All-Tournament Team in 1990. Copper was also awarded UBC's Kay Brearley Award for service to women's athletics in 1992.
