= Fiona Horne =

- Also known as: captainfifi
- Born: Fiona Therese Horne; 24 June 1966 (age 60); Sydney, New South Wales, Australia
- Genres: Rock, crossover thrash, techno
- Years active: 1983–present
- Labels: Air Records; Mystic Monkey; Rajon Music; Universal Music; EMI
- Formerly of: Sister Sludge; The Mothers; Def FX
- Website: www.fionahorne.com

Fiona Therese Horne (born 24 June 1966) is an Australian singer who is the former lead singer of electro-rock band, Def FX, before continuing on to author several best-selling books on Modern Witchcraft. She is a popular radio and television personality, appearing on many programs around the world. She is now a commercial pilot, humanitarian aid worker, world record holding skydiver, professional fire dancer, yoga instructor and freediver.

== Musical career ==
=== 1984–1989: Sister Sludge and The Mothers ===
Horne started playing in bands when she moved to Adelaide, South Australia, in 1984. Her first band was Sister Sludge, which only lasted for six months until Horne moved back to Sydney. She then formed a punk-thrash band, The Mothers, in 1985. The Mothers started as an all-girl punk band, although the lineup changed a number of times. This was the first band with Horne performing both vocals and guitar. In October 1987, The Mothers, comprising Horne (vocals, guitar), Nat (guitar), Jo Collings (bass) and Rick (drums), released their first single, "Drives Me Wild"/"Get Outta My Life", which was followed in 1989 by the EP, 12-Incher, with the line-up of Horne (guitar, vocals), Rick (drums), Luke (guitar) and Cristina Calero (bass), both of which were released on the Waterfront Records label. The Mothers broke up in 1989.

=== 1990–1997: Def FX ===
In 1990, Horne formed the industrial-dance-rock band Def FX with Blake Gardner (guitar; ex-Bezerk), Sean Lowry (synthesisers, sequencers, samples; ex-King Prawn), Martyn Basha (bass; ex-Bezerk). The band issued three EPs, Water, in June 1991, Surge, in November and Blink in June 1992 on the Phantom label before signing to EMI. In December 1992 the band released their debut album, Light Speed Collision. At the 1994 Big Day Out Horne made headlines by appearing topless on stage. In September 1994, they released the EP Post Moronic, which reached No. 43 on the Australian charts. The band were dropped from the EMI label. In May 1995 they released their second album, Ritual Eternal, on their own label, Cicada. They then signed with Universal Music Australia's subsidiary label Grudge, which released the band's third album, Majick, in July 1996. Def FX disbanded in May 1997.

=== 1998–2011: Solo career ===
In 1998 Horne made several appearances on the television series Good News Week, singing duets with the show's host, Paul McDermott. Virgin/EMI subsequently released a single of their duet, "Shut Up/Kiss Me", in November 1998, which reached No. 48 on the Australian singles charts in December.

In October 1999, Horne released her debut single, "Let’s Go Out Tonight", on Air Records. The song was co-written with Peter Farnan (Boom Crash Opera) and Simon Austin (Frente!).

In March 2007, Horne released her first solo album Witch Web. In 2010, she released the spoken word album Magickal Life-Guided Meditations and Spells for Positive Change, on her own label, Mystic Monkey.

=== 2012–present: Def FX reformation and formation of Seawitch ===
In 2012, Def FX reformed for a national tour in May–June, playing in Brisbane, Sydney, Melbourne, Hobart and Adelaide. This was followed by another tour in October - November 2013 with the band playing shows in Adelaide, Melbourne, Newcastle, Sydney and Brisbane. The band toured again in 2019 ... originally performed as a farewell tour, the band decided to rename it, 'The Never Say Never Tour'.

In 2022 Horne formed a new band, Seawitch, with Dave Hopkins (ex-Hellmenn) on guitar, Brad Miller on bass, Kenny Watt on keyboards and Adam Sciullo on drums. The band released its debut album, Well of Spells, on 21 October 2022, on Cheersquad Records and Tapes. The first single, "Witches Forever", which was followed by a second single, "Force".

== Modelling and acting ==
In October 1994, she featured in a nude pictorial in Black+White magazine. In 1998 she was featured in the September issue of Ralph, FHM Australia and on the cover of the November issue of Australian Playboy. After moving to Los Angeles in 2001, Horne featured in the October 2005 issue of Playboy.

In 2001, Horne starred in the Australian opening season of Eve Ensler's theatrical production The Vagina Monologues; she also appeared in an episode of the Australian television series Pizza that year. Horne has continued to act, appearing in the 2005 film, Unbeatable Harold, which starred Dylan McDermott and Henry Winkler and the 2007 film Cult, starring Rachel Miner and Taryn Manning. Horne also appeared in the independent fantasy features, Fable-Teeth of Beasts and Ember Days.

In 2004, Horne was a host (called an 'Alt') in the reality television show Mad Mad House for the Sci Fi Channel. She also competed in Australian Celebrity Survivor: Vanuatu for the Seven Network Australia (which aired in August 2006).

== Personal life ==
Horne is currently a commercial pilot and works for a charter company based in the Caribbean. She also co-ordinates and executes humanitarian aid missions.

Horne also works as a yoga instructor and professional fire dancer - she performs regularly in the Caribbean at resorts and private events, as well as special engagements in New Orleans and Los Angeles.

Horne is vegetarian and was formerly vegan.

In July 2017, Rockpool Publishing Australia published Horne's autobiography, The Naked Witch. In 2019 her manifesto The Art of Witch and debut oracle deck, The Magick of You Oracle were published by Rockpool. In 2021 her guide to Witchcraft, Teen Magick - Witchcraft for a New Generation was released by Rockpool/Simon & Schuster. Horne relocated to Western Australia to conduct a book tour and explore new opportunities in the wake of international lockdowns and closures. Perth Now

In 2020 Horne formed music duo, Spiff & Fifi with Dave Hopkins (The Hellmenn) and heavy rock band, Seawitch also with Hopkins. Both acts are toured Western Australia, with single and album releases signed with The Manick Label/Ingrooves Universal. She is in a relationship with Dave Hopkins, after having left the Caribbean to live with him in Western Australia, where she currently resides

== Bibliography ==
- Horne, Fiona (1998). Witch: A Personal Journey. Random House Australia. ISBN 0-09-183387-6.
- Horne, Fiona (1999). Witch: A Magickal Year. Random House Australia. ISBN 0-09-184000-7.
- Horne, Fiona (2000). Life's a Witch: A Handbook for Teen Witches. Random House Australia. ISBN 1-74051-022-4.
- Horne, Fiona (2001). Witch: A Magickal Journey: A Hip Guide to Modern Witchcraft. Thorsons. ISBN 0-00-710399-9.
- Horne, Fiona (2001). 7 Days to a Magickal New You. Thorsons. ISBN 0-00-712346-9.
- Horne, Fiona (2002). In 7 Tagen magische Kräfte wecken (hardback) (in German). Bauer, Freiburg. ISBN 3-7626-0875-X.
- Horne, Fiona (2002). Magickal Sex: A Witches' Guide to Beds, Knobs, and Broomsticks. Thorsons. ISBN 0-00-714133-5.
- Horne, Fiona (2003). Witchin': A Handbook for Teen Witches. Thorsons. ISBN 0-613-89284-4.
- Horne, Fiona (2004). Fiona Horne (ed.). Pop! Goes the Witch: The Disinformation Guide to 21st Century Witchcraft. Disinformation. ISBN 0-9729529-5-0.
- Horne, Fiona (2005). The Coven: Making Magick Together. Random House Australia.
- Horne, Fiona (2006). Bewitch a Man: How to Find Him and Keep Him Under Your Spell. Simon Spotlight Entertainment. ISBN 1-4169-1474-9.
- Horne, Fiona (2007). L.A. Witch: Fiona Horne's Guide to Coven Magick. Llewellyn Publications. ISBN 978-0-7387-1034-1.
- Horne, Fiona (2012). Witch-A Summerland Mystery. Allen & Unwin. ISBN 9781494484279.
- Horne, Fiona (2017). The Naked Witch; An Autobiography. Rockpool Publishing. ISBN 978-1-925429-63-3.
- Horne, Fiona (2019). The Art of Witch. Rockpool Publishing. ISBN 9781925682830.
- Horne, Fiona (2019). Teen Magick-Witchcraft for A New Generation. Rockpool Publishing. ISBN 9781925924411.
- Horne, Fiona (2024).Living With the Elements: Extreme Adventures for Witches.Warlock Press Publishing. ISBN 1733246665

== Discography ==
=== Albums Under Own Name ===
List of albums, with selected details
| Title | Album details |
|---|---|
| Witch Web | Released: 12 March 2007; Label: Rajon Music (B000NKHK5U); Format: CD |
| Magickal Life-Guided Meditations and Spells for Positive Change | Released: 2010; Label: Mystic Monkey; Format: CD |

=== Singles ===
List of singles, with Australian chart positions
| Title | Year | Peak chart positions |
| Title | Year | AUS |
|---|---|---|
| "Shut Up / Kiss Me" (with Paul McDermott) | 1998 | 48 |
| "Let's Go Out Tonight" | 1999 | - |

=== Discography with Band The Mothers ===
- "Drives Me Wild"/"Get Outta My Life" - Waterfront Records (DAMP54) 1987
- "12 Incher" - Waterfront Records (DAMP84) 1988

=== Discography with Band Def FX ===
- Surge (Extended Play). 1991
- Water (Extended Play). 1991
- Blink (Extended Play). 1992
- Light Speed Collision (Album). 1992
- Space Time Disco (Single). 1993
- No Time for Nowhere (Single). 1993
- Something Inside/No Time for Nowhere (Single). 1993
- Baptism (Album). 1993
- Post Moronic (Extended Play). 1994
- Ritual Eternal (Album). 1995
- Kill the Real Girls (Extended Play). 1995
- Psychoactive Summer (Extended Play). 1995
- Majick (Album). 1996
- Spell on You (Single). 1996
- I'll Be Your Magick (Single). 1996
- DejaVu/Head Fuck (Single). 1996

=== Discography with Band Sea Witch ===
- "Trial of Love" (Single). 2021
- "Amulet" (Single). 2021
- "Initiate" (Single). 2021
- "Witch Hunt" (Single). 2021
- Well of Spells (Album). 2022
- "Force" (Single). 2022

== Oracle Decks ==
- Horne, Fiona. The Magick of Your Oracle. Rockpool Publishing. 2019. ISBN 192568282X
- Horne, Fiona. Dark Magick Oracle: Reveal the Light Within. Rockpool Publishing. 2023. ISBN 1922579386
- Horne, Fiona. Witch Magick: Messages from a Witch's Journey. Rockpool Publishing. 2024. ISBN 1922579394
- Horne, Fiona. Lost Oracle: Ancient Wisdom to Find Your Way by in the Modern World. (Forthcoming October 2024). Rockpool Publishing. 2024. ISBN 1922786012

== Filmography ==
Film and Television
| Year | Film | Role | Notes |
|---|---|---|---|
| 2001; Episode Four – Season Two | Pizza | Survivor host | Australian television series |
| 2004 | Mad Mad House | The Witch | Reality television series |
| 2006 | Celebrity Survivor | Herself | Reality television series |
| 2006 | Unbeatable Harold | Cherry | Film |
| 2007 | Cult | Professor Estabrook | Film |
| 2010 | Fable: Teeth of Beasts | Maggie Trader | Video release |
| 2011 | Pets of the Rich and Famous | | Television movie |
| 2012 | Ronn's Garage | Herself | Television series |
| 2013 | Ember Days | Summer Lady | Video release |

== Sources ==
- 'Def FX' entry at Encyclopedia of Australian Rock and Pop by Ian McFarlane
- Fiona Horne (Chaos Control interview, October 2003)
- "Fiona Horne". Stellar Magazine. July 2017.
- Fiona Horne (The Spirit of Things ABC Radio National interview, July 2017)
- Fiona Horne (50 So What interview - book extract, July 2017)
- Fiona Horne (Popstar to Pilot - WHO Weekly Magazine, August 2017)
- Fiona Horne (The Morning Show Channel 7 Australia July 2017)
- (Raise The Horns, An Interview with Fiona Horne by Jason Mankey, PATHEOS April 2018)
