= Alan Saunders (broadcaster) =

British-Australian broadcaster, philosopher, and writer (1954-2012)

Alan John Saunders (22 July 1954 – 15 June 2012) was a prominent British philosopher, food writer, novelist and radio broadcaster in Australia.

== Early life and academic career ==
Saunders was born in London and raised in Harringay, North London. His father, Sydney Saunders, was a taxi driver and his mother, Edith, was a secretary in a school. Saunders' interest in gastronomy initially came about through childhood holidays abroad with his parents, who were adventurous eaters.

He gained a Bachelor of Arts in philosophy at the University of Leicester and a Bachelor of Science from the London School of Economics, and was a Frances A. Yates Research Fellow at the Warburg Institute, University of London. In 1992, he was one of the first recipients of Australia’s Pascall Prize for Critical Writing and Broadcasting, and, in 2007, was awarded the Special Media Prize by the Australasian Association of Philosophy. He gained his PhD from the Australian National University, with a dissertation on the 18th-century English philosopher Joseph Priestley.

== Media career and writing ==
After a period of freelance work for the Australian Broadcasting Corporation while still based in London, Saunders moved to Sydney and joined Radio National in 1987. During his career he presented The Food Program, Screen, The Comfort Zone, By Design and The Philosopher's Zone. He was a regular and occasional columnist for media outlets such as The Sydney Morning Herald, The Bulletin, Australian Financial Review, Food Australia, Delicious Magazine and The Times Literary Supplement. He was also "the critic" on the ABC TV series The Chopping Block.

Saunders was the author of A is for Apple (William Heinemann 1995), a collection of essays loosely revolving around food. Writing about the book for The Australian Financial Review, the journalist Maria Trefely-Deutch praised Saunders for his "very real appreciation of popular culture. In discussing prohibitions against eating pigs, only Saunders can jump from Rabbi Moses Maimonides, the great Jewish philosopher of the Middle Ages to Arnold, Eva Gabor's neighbor's pet pig in the 1960s sitcom, Green Acres". His satirical novel, Alanna (Penguin 2002), was described by the critic Peter Pierce in The Sydney Morning Herald's books pages as "sportive and engaging, fast paced and unsparing of its targets. Saunders not only mocks the pretensions of the Australian literary world, but the wider community that is content to be deluded, to consume ersatz spirituality where and however it is peddled, to embrace the author as much as the book."

== Death and tributes ==
In June 2012, Saunders contracted a viral infection which developed into pneumonia. On 14 June, he was taken by ambulance from the ABC Studios, where he was recording his program The Philosopher's Zone, to St Vincent's Hospital in Darlinghurst. He died there the following day.

A retrospective edition of The Philosopher's Zone entitled "Tribute to the philosophical Alan Saunders" was broadcast on Radio National on 24 June 2012.

The Age published an online obituary on 26 June 2012.

== Bibliography ==
- Saunders, Alan, A Portrait of Sir Karl Popper, The Science Show, ABC Radio National, 15 January 2000 (accessed 27 December 2007).
- Saunders, Alan, "The State as highwayman: from candour to rights", in Enlightenment and Religion: Rational Dissent in Eighteenth-Century Britain, ed. Knud Haakonssen, Cambridge University Press, 1996, ISBN 9780521560603 | ISBN 0521560608
