= Primary (band) =

Australian electronic rock band

- Origin: Sydney, New South Wales, Australia
- Genres: Electronic rock
- Years active: 1995–2003
- Labels: Warner
- Past members: John Bousfield; Jamie Fonti; Sean Fonti; Connie Mitchell; Paul Wheeler; Justin Leef; Jason Howard

Primary were an Australian electronic rock band which formed in 1995 the Fonti brothers: Jamie on keyboards and Sean on bass guitar (both ex-Caligula), and Connie Mitchell on lead vocals. According to Australian musicologist, Ian McFarlane, the group were "Dominated by South African-born [Mitchell]'s hyperactive and full-frontal vocals, with thunderous electronic rock underpinning the music, Primary sounded like a techno Skunk Anansie. Jamie Fonti coined the phrase 'Hybrid Electronica Rock' in order to describe the band's sound." The group released two albums, This Is the Sound (June 1999) and Watching the World (28 May 2001). They disbanded late in 2003.

== History ==
Primary was formed as a techno rock group in 1995 in Sydney by the Fonti brothers, Jamie on keyboards and Sean on bass guitar (both ex-Caligula), and Connie Mitchell on lead vocals. The Fontis had played in My Heart Bleeds for You, a mid-1980s punk, hardcore band, then in Caligula from 1989 to 1994. Sean was also in Massappeal(1988–90), and Def FX (1995–97). The Fonti brothers had met Mitchell in a recording studio in 1994, while they recorded demo tracks for Caligula. When that project finished Jamie and Mitchell started writing tracks together while Sean was a member of Def FX. Their first musical project was a contribution to the soundtrack of the 1997 Australian film Blackrock.

Primary's first recording, a five-track extended play, Vicious Precious, produced by Paul McKercher and Ollie J, was released in March 1998, and featured Paul Wheeler (ex-Icehouse) on drums. and John Bousfield on guitar. At the ARIA Music Awards of 1998, "Vicious Precious" was nominated for ARIA Award for Breakthrough Artist – Single.

Nick Launay produced the band's first full-length album, This Is the Sound, which appeared in June that year on WEA/Warner. Airplay for the lead-in singles had been confined to the Triple J network, and the album peaked in the ARIA Albums Chart top 40. Australian musicologist, Ian McFarlane, felt it was "an accomplished album that boasted state-of-the-art production values, and a batch of reverberating tracks." He described how the group were "Dominated by South African-born [Mitchell]'s hyperactive and full-frontal vocals, with thunderous electronic rock underpinning the music, Primary sounded like a techno Skunk Anansie. Jamie Fonti coined the phrase 'Hybrid Electronica Rock' in order to describe the band's sound."

Jason Howard replaced Bousfield on lead guitar and made his performance debut in April 1999. They became known for their energetic live shows, with Mitchell's on-stage presence and costumes a talking point. Their second album, Watching the World, was released on 28 May 2001. Australian music journalist, Ed Nimmervoll, declared it to be his Album of the Week: "they kept the focus on the songs. In the end Primary offer music with many layers of interest. [Mitchell]'s lyrics are a strong counterpoint to the depth of the band's music."

The band announced on their website on 24 April 2002 that they were recording demos for a proposed third album. The band eventually recorded enough material for another album, in a more straightforward rock sound, but the band broke up before it could be released. They played a final gig in November 2003 at the Annandale Hotel. Mitchell joined Sneaky Sound System in 2004 ahead of their self-titled album.

== Discography ==
=== Studio albums ===
List of albums, with selected chart positions
Title	Album details	Peak chart positions		
Title	Album details	AUS Top 100	AUS Australasian	AUS Alternative
This Is the Sound	Released: June 1999; Label: Warner (3984269762); Format: CD	33	—	—
Watching the World	Released: 28 May 2001; Label: Warner (8573878462); Format: CD	—	14	17

=== Extended plays ===
List of EP, with selected chart positions
Title	Album details	Peak chart positions
Title	Album details	AUS
Vicious Precious	Released: March 1998; Label: Warner (3984227292); Format: CD	84

=== Singles ===
List of singles, with selected chart positions
Title	Year	Peak chart positions		Album
Title	Year	AUS Top 100	AUS Alternative	Album
"Brasil"	1997	—	—	Vicious Precious
"Vicious Precious"/"Brasil"	1998	—	—	Vicious Precious
"Young"/"This Is the Sound"	1999	89	—	This Is the Sound
"Supposed to Be Here"	1999	72	—	This Is the Sound
"In Your Hands"	2000	—	—	Watching the World
"Not for Me"	2001	—	17	Watching the World

== Awards and nominations ==
=== ARIA Music Awards ===
The ARIA Music Awards is an annual awards ceremony that recognises excellence, innovation, and achievement across all genres of Australian music. They commenced in 1987.

Year	Nominee / work	Award	Result	Ref.
1998	"Vicious Precious"	Breakthrough Artist - Single	Nominated	
1999	Nick Launay for "Supposed to Be Here", "24000", "This Is the Sound" and "Come to Take You Home"	Producer of the Year	Nominated	
1999	Nick Launay for "Supposed to Be Here", "24000", "This Is the Sound" and "Come to Take You Home"	Engineer of the Year	Won	
