= Anthony Ackroyd =

Australian comedian, speaker and writer

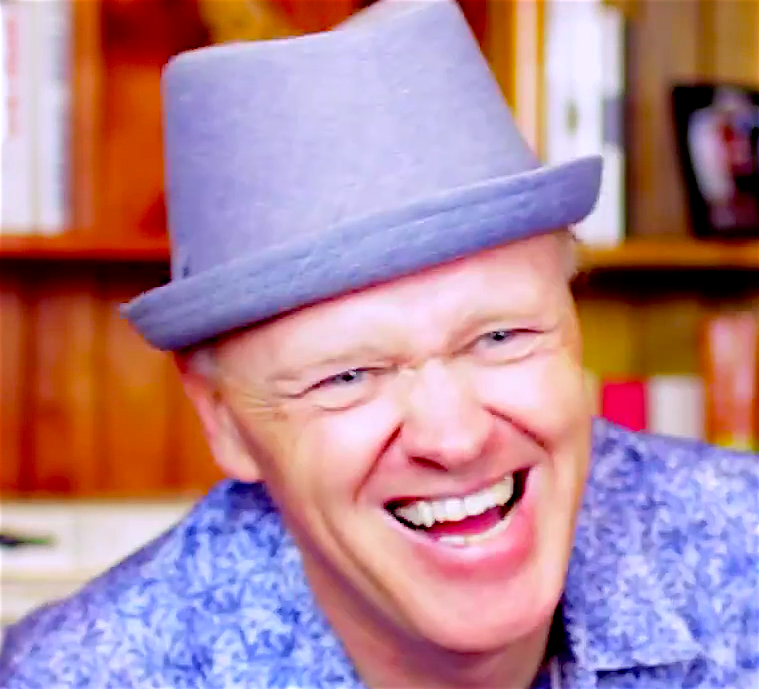
- Born: Anthony Michael Ackroyd; Hobart, Tasmania, Australia
- Education: University of Tasmania
- Occupations: Comedian, speaker, writer
- Partner: Anna
- Children: 2

Anthony Michael Ackroyd is an Australian comedian, writer, speaker, musician, actor, coach, and teacher.

== Early life and education ==
Anthony Michael Ackroyd was born in Hobart, Tasmania and grew up in the suburb of Warrane.

He graduated from the University of Tasmania with a Bachelor of Arts, majoring in English Literature, European Literature and Philosophy.

== Career ==
Ackroyd began performing stand-up comedy at the Sydney Comedy Store in the 1980s. Television exposure followed with appearances on popular TV shows such as The Video Comedy Store, Hey Hey It's Saturday and The Midday Show. From 1989 to 1991 he was a cast member on ABC TV's pioneering live comedy show The Big Gig. During the 1990s he appeared on TV shows including Good News Week, Tonight Live, Mornings with Kerri-Anne, and Pizza. He performed the critically acclaimed comedy monologue "Karma Comedian" on ABC's The Smallest Room in the House, which detailed with great honesty many aspects of his life to that point. Between 1996–2021 he was a cast member of the ABC radio current events comedy show Thank God It's Friday!

Ackroyd performed for many years as a clown doctor at the Sydney Children's Hospital as well as working as a humour therapist in aged care facilities. He currently teaches the healing power of laughter and humour to people with PTSD, trauma issues, serious and chronic illnesses at the Quest For Life Centre in the Southern Highlands of New South Wales.

He is an international speaker whose keynote delivery, Stress Less Laugh More, aims to teach people how to use the power of laughter to change their lives and transform businesses.

Ackroyd's one man shows have included Anthony Ackroyd in His Own Little World, Ecstasy and How To Get It, At Last The Truth About Everything, and The Fruit of My Lions.

He has written for TV and film, including the sketch show The Comedy Company and two years writing for an internet sitcom spin off for Jim Carrey's Ace Ventura character. He has workshopped material with writer-performers such as Billy Crystal and Rowan Atkinson. Ackroyd's articles have appeared in The Sydney Morning Herald, The Age, Vogue, Life Etc., Studio, Eco Magazine, Parenting, Men's Stuff, the Good Weekend and Good Taste. He has held the position of senior writer at Granada ITV. For 3 years he was the director of the Bowral Of Laughs Comedy Festival held in Bowral, New South Wales.

Ackroyd's film work includes roles in the movies Reckless Kelly, Gino, and WillFull. He provided the voice of Dragon on the children's TV show Magic Mountain.

Ackroyd became a frequent impersonator of former Australian prime minister Kevin Rudd, and hosted his own show Political Bent.

At the 2014 by-election for the seat of Griffith, brought about following the retirement of Kevin Rudd from the Australian House of Representatives, Ackroyd contested the poll representing the Bullet Train party. He was also a candidate at the 2016 federal election for the seat of Wentworth, representing the Arts Party.

Ackroyd was a senior tutor teaching the Advanced Diploma comedy and improvisation courses at Screenwise Acting School in Sydney.

Ackroyd has been CEO of his companies Feel Betterer, Creative Call, Write My Fire, Story Of You, and The Laughter Advantage. He is currently active as a comedian, writer, speaker, and coach. He currently heads his company Elevate Your Life.

== Personal life ==
Ackroyd is the father of two children, and as of 2012 was living with his partner, Anna, in Bowral, on the NSW Southern Highlands.

He is an ambassador for the Sydney Swans.
