= Greg Sullivan =

American physicist

Greg Sullivan is a physicist at the University of Maryland, a Fellow of the American Physical Society and was a team member and spokesperson on the IceCube Experiment at Antarctica.
