= Claire Hooper =

Australian stand-up comedian and writer

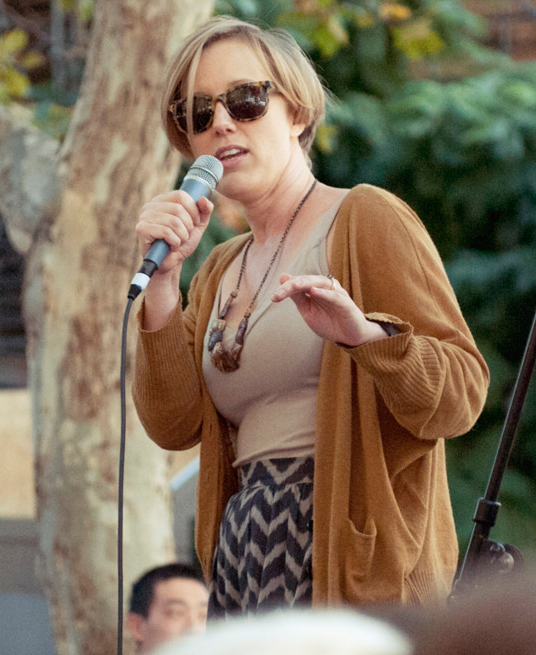
- Hooper at the 2012 Sydney Marriage Equality Rally
- Born: 5 September 1976 (age 50); Perth, Western Australia
- Education: Helena College, Curtin University
- Notable work: The Great Australian Bake Off
- Spouse: Wade Duffin
- Children: 2

Comedy career
- Years active: 2004–present
- Medium: Stand-up, television, radio
- Website: entertainmentbureau.com.au/portfolio-view/claire-hooper/

Claire Hooper (born 5 September 1976) is an Australian stand-up comedian, television and radio presenter and writer. Hooper previously co-hosted The Great Australian Bake Off alongside Mel Buttle.

She appeared as a team captain on the 2008 revival of Good News Week on Network Ten and was a regular on The Sideshow, appearing with Paul McDermott. Since 2005, she has regularly performed at the Melbourne International Comedy Festival.

== Career ==
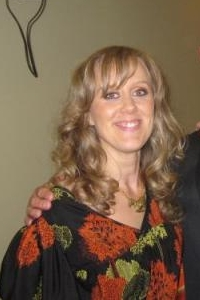

Hooper has appeared at the Melbourne International Comedy Festival and on Stand Up Australia, How the Quest Was Won, The Sideshow, Rove Live, Sleuth 101, Good News Week, The Project, Hughesy, We Have a Problem, Celebrity Name Game, The Living Room and Would I Lie to You? Australia.

Prior to entering into comedy, Hooper worked in children's and adult theatre in Perth, Western Australia, as an actress and director. Hooper attended Curtin University and graduated with a degree in Theatre Studies. She has written, directed and costumed professionally for many youth theatre productions.

In 2004, Hooper won the Western Australian finals of Triple J's Raw Comedy. In 2005, she was selected to perform in "The Comedy Zone" for the Melbourne International Comedy Festival, and was awarded "Best and Fairest" at the National Improvisation Championships in Sydney. Claire discovered she had a goitre that required surgery, which led her to wonder what she would do if she ever lost her voice. In 2006, Hooper performed a one-hour live show titled Oh inspired by the incident, during which she did not speak at all, instead communicating through recorded audio, videos, handwritten signs, breakdancing and mime. The show was well received, earning a nomination at the Melbourne International Comedy Festival for the "Best Newcomer" award. Her 2007 show, "Show Girl", was inspired by Kylie Minogue and involved Hooper juxtaposing ideas of Minogue as dignified and ladylike with her own failed attempts to maintain dignity. In 2008, she returned to the Melbourne International Comedy Festival to perform a new solo show, "Storybook".

In addition to her live comedy shows, Hooper has made numerous appearances on Australian radio and television since 2005. Her television credits include guest stand-up appearances on Stand Up Australia and Rove Live, a presenting role on How the Quest Was Won and a regular segment on The Sideshow. She was a member of the negating team with Stephen K. Amos and Greg Fleet in the 2007 Melbourne International Comedy Festival's Great Debate which aired on Network Ten. In 2008, she was cast to replace Julie McCrossin as a regular team captain on Good News Week. She also appeared as the guest detective in episode three of dark comedy mini-series Sleuth 101.

In July 2015, Hooper and Mel Buttle were announced as the hosts of the second season of The Great Australian Bake Off, which began airing on LifeStyle Food in October 2015. The series returned for a third season in October 2016, and a fourth season in January 2018.

In 2024, Hooper was awarded The Piece of Wood Award at the Melbourne International Comedy Festival.

In 2025, Hooper began hosting Claire Hooper's House of Games, the Australian version of the British quiz show Richard Osman's House of Games, on ABC TV.
