= Margaret Scott (Australian author) =

Australian poet

- Born: Margaret Daphne Scott (nee Russell); 20 June 1934; Bristol, England, United Kingdom
- Died: 29 August 2005 (aged 71); Hobart, Tasmania, Australia
- Citizenship: Australian
- Education: University of Cambridge University of Tasmania
- Occupations: Author; poet; comedian; educator; public intellectual
- Spouse: Michael Boddy
- Writing career
- Language: English

Margaret Daphne Scott (20 June 1934 – 29 August 2005) was an Australian author, poet, comedian, educator and public intellectual.

== Background ==
Margaret Daphne Russell was born in Bristol, daughter of Edward Russell. She was educated at Redland High School and went up to Newnham College, Cambridge to study English in 1953, graduating in 1956. She was a contemporary of Sylvia Plath at Cambridge.

Margaret, her first husband, playwright Michael Boddy and her first son, Daniel, migrated to Tasmania from the United Kingdom in 1959. Two more children, Kate and Marcus, were born in Tasmania. From 1979, she lived with legal scholar Michael Scott and had her final child, Sarah, as well as becoming the step mother to Jane, Christian and Katharine Scott. In 1978, Margaret received her PhD from the University of Tasmania, and was head of the English department at the university until 1989. She worked at the university for over 25 years, but left to devote herself full-time to her writing career. Her publications include four books of poetry, two novels, a libretto and numerous articles. She became well known in Australia in the 1990s as a regular guest on the television show Good News Week. She was also known for her activism on environmental issues and human rights.

In 1995, a portrait of Margaret Scott by painter Geoffrey Dyer was a finalist in the Archibald Prize. The prize is awarded for a painting, "preferentially of some man or woman distinguished in Art, Letters, Science or Politics."

In 2005, she was selected for the inaugural Tasmanian Honour Roll of Women and received the Australia Council Writers Emeritus Award. She died of emphysema.

In 2007 the inaugural Margaret Scott Prize for best book by a Tasmanian author was awarded as one of the Tasmanian Premier's Literary Prizes.

== Bibliography ==
Margaret Scott's publications include:

- Tricks of Memory : poems (1980)
- Visited (1983)
- The Black Swans (1988)
- The Baby Farmer (1990)
- "Uneasy Eden : peace and conflict in a rural community" [pamphlet] (1997)
- Port Arthur : a story of strength and courage (1997)
- Changing Countries : on moving from one island to another (2000)
- Collected Poems (2000)
- Convict Trail : Tasman Peninsula and Port Arthur (2000?)
- Family Album : a novel of secrets and memories (2000)
- In the shadows [previously published as The Baby Farmer] 2001

Margaret Scott's poetry has been featured in a number of anthologies including:

- Effects of light: the poetry of Tasmania (1985)
- A writer's Tasmania. Vol. 1 (2000)
- New music: an anthology of contemporary Australian poetry (2001)
- River of Verse: A Tasmanian Journey 1800–2004 (2004)
- The best Australian poetry 2004 (2004)

Recorded programs:

- The nature of gardens [four Australian writers explore what gardens mean] – ABC sound cassette (2001)
- That beauty is better than brains : the debate – ABC sound cassette (1994

== Awards ==
=== Mo Awards ===
The Australian Entertainment Mo Awards (commonly known informally as the Mo Awards), were annual Australian entertainment industry awards. They recognise achievements in live entertainment in Australia from 1975 to 2016. Margaret (Maggie) Scott won six awards in that time.

Year	Nominee / work	Award	Result (wins only)
1997	Maggie Scott	Versatile Variety Performance of the Year	Won
1998	Maggie Scott	Versatile Variety Performance of the Year	Won
1998	Maggie Scott	Variety Performance of the Year	Won
1999	Maggie Scott	Versatile Variety Performance of the Year	Won
1999	Maggie Scott	Variety Performance of the Year	Won
2002	Maggie Scott	Female Comedy Performer of the Year	Won
