= Rod Quantock =

Australian comedian

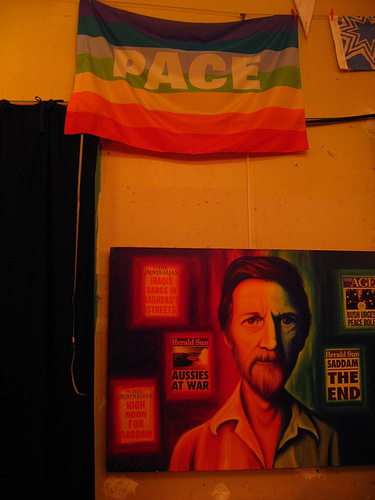
- Rod Quantock as featured in an art piece at the Trades Hall.
- Born: 1948 (age 77–78)

Comedy career
- Years active: 1975–present
- Medium: Cabaret, theatre, television, radio, print, corporate sector
- Genre: Political satire
- Website: www.quantock.com.au

Rodney Edward Quantock OAM (born 1948) is an Australian stand-up comedian and writer. Quantock is known for his stand-up comedy and acting in Capt'n Snooze advertisements. He has also been involved in political activism and social justice.

== Biography ==
=== Early life ===
Quantock grew up in Coburg. His father worked in Fitzroy in a metal polishing factory and as a tram conductor. Quantock studied architecture at the University of Melbourne. His interest in comedy started at the university Architect's revue in 1969, where he met his future wife Mary Kenneally.

=== Break into theatre ===
Quantock participated of live theatre in Australia in the 1970s, conceiving and performing in full-scale productions for many of Australia's comedy venues including The Flying Trapeze Cafe, Foibles Theatre Restaurant, The Last Laugh, The Comedy Café and the Trades Hall.

Along with Kenneally, Geoff Brooks and Stephen Blackburn, Quantock opened and operated The Comedy Cafe and Banana Lounge.

=== Television ===
Quantock worked on the series Ratbags, Australia You're Standing In It, Fast Forward, Denton, BackBerner and was a performer on The Big Gig and Good News Week.

In 2005, he appeared as the subject of an art exhibition displayed at Crown Casino.

Quantock was a founding member on the Melbourne International Comedy Festival board, a consultant to the Melbourne Moomba Festival and a member of the Arts Committee of the Bicentennial BHP Awards For Excellence.

=== Capt'n Snooze ===
Quantock starred in a series of television advertisements for bed retailer Capt'n Snooze from the '80s to the late '90s, but stated that his main reason was financial.

=== Bus ===
Quantock conducted various comical evening bus tours of Melbourne and other parts of Victoria since the 1980s called Bus, Son of Tram.

=== Publications ===
From 1989–1994, Quantock was a weekly columnist for the Sunday Age and in September 1999, Double Disillusion, a compilation book of these columns and some of his live performances, was published.

== Political activism ==
Quantock supports left-wing politics and was the host of the 1997, 1998 and 2004 Ska-TV Activist awards which were broadcast on community television around Australia. He gave a speech at 17 January 2010 rally at the closure of The Tote Hotel.

In 2013 and 2014 Quantock was MC at a number of rallies and public meetings in the campaign to stop the then-proposed East-West Link tollway. In 2014, Quantock became a research associate at the Melbourne Sustainable Society Institute, University of Melbourne, working on the presentation of climate change impacts and resource crises.

== Awards ==
- Order of Australia Medal (2015)
- Director's Award, Melbourne International Comedy Festival (2012)
- Australia Council Theatre Board Fellowship (2007)
- Quantock received a Green Room Award for his one-man show Sunrise Boulevard (1997)
- The Individual Award at the Sydney Myer Performing Arts Awards (2004)
- Adelaide Justice Coalition Romero Community Award (2005)
