= James O'Loghlin =

Australian comedian and writer

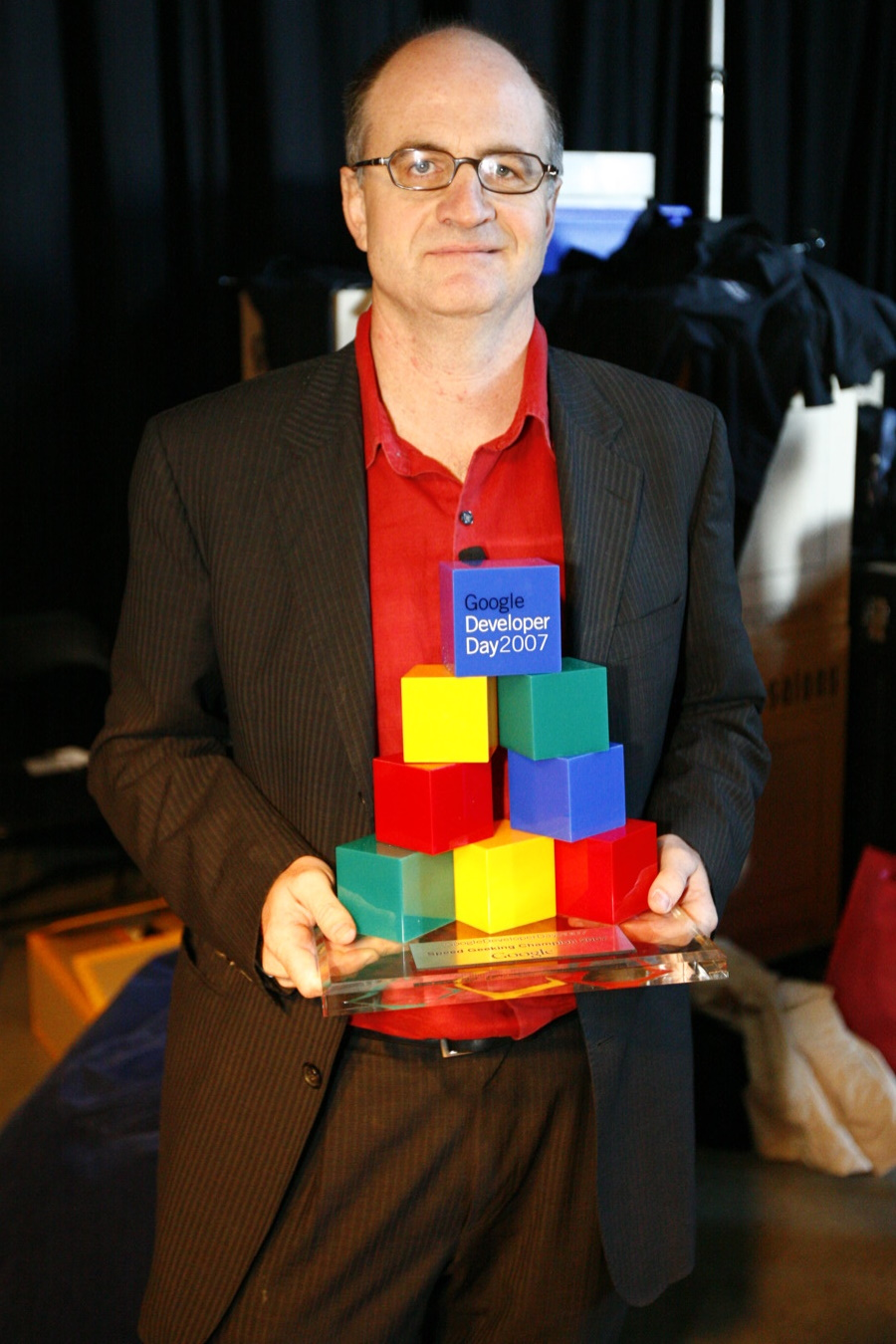
- O'Loghlin in 2007
- Born: James O'Loghlin; 1966 (age 59–60); Canberra, Australian Capital Territory
- Notable work: The New Inventors
- Partner: Lucy Bell
- Children: 3

Comedy career
- Years active: 1990s–present
- Medium: Stand-up talk show host writer radio personality
- Website: http://jamesologhlin.com

James O'Loghlin (born 1966) is an Australian comedian, television and radio presenter and former lawyer. He works for the Australian Broadcasting Corporation's Local Radio afternoon program in Sydney and New South Wales.

== Career ==
Previously a commercial and criminal lawyer (he studied law at the University of Sydney), he was for some years a professional stand-up comedian and writer, and hosted his own television show O'Loghlin on Saturday Night on ABC Television and Inside the Arena on Foxtel. He also hosted The New Inventors on ABC Television.

O'Loghlin has also written and performed in the live comedy shows Lawyer Lawyer (which concentrated on his years as a criminal lawyer) and Caught in the A.C.T.

== Works ==
O'Loghlin has written books for adults and children including:

=== Adults ===
- A Month of Sundays: How to Go Travelling Without Leaving Town, (2004)
- Umm--: A Complete Guide to Public Speaking, (2006)
- How to Balance Your Life: Practical Ways to Achieve Work/Life Balance, (2009)
- Innovation is a State of Mind: Simple Strategies to be More Innovative in Everything You Do, (2016)
- Criminals, (2022)
- Liars, (2024)

=== Children ===
- Andy's Secret Weapon, Hodder (2004)
- The Adventures of Sir Roderick, the Not-Very Brave, Pan Macmillan (2014) Short-listed: Patricia Wrightson Prize for Children's Literature, New South Wales Premier's Literary Awards 2015.
- Daisy Malone and the Blue Glowing Stone, Pan Macmillan (2015))
- The Twins of Tintarfell, Pan Macmillan (2016))

== Awards ==
O'Loghlin has received a 2014 Speech Pathology Australia Book of the Year Award for The Adventures of Sir Roderick, which was also on the shortlist for the 2015 Patricia Wrightson Prize.

== Personal life ==
In November 2007, O'Loghlin announced he would be leaving his previous ABC radio show to spend more time with his family. His wife is actress Lucy Bell. He returned to host the afternoon program when host James Valentine became seriously ill in 2024.

== See also ==
- ABC Local Radio
- 702 ABC Sydney
