= Julie McCrossin =

Australian broadcaster and comedian

Julie McCrossin AM
- Born: 2 October 1954 (age 72); Sydney, New South Wales, Australia
- Occupations: Radio broadcaster, journalist, comedian
- Years active: 1975−present
- Known for: Good News Week
- Partner: Melissa Gibson

Julie Elizabeth McCrossin AM (born 2 October 1954) is an Australian radio broadcaster, journalist, comedian, political commentator and activist for women's and gay rights. She is best known for her role as a team captain on the news-based comedy quiz show Good News Week between 1996 and 2000.

== Personal life ==
Born in 1954, McCrossin grew up in Sydney. She had troubles with alcohol in her youth and describes herself as having been a "hopeless drinker" before she stopped drinking altogether at age 24. She lives with her long-term partner, Melissa Gibson, and Melissa's two children from a previous relationship. She is an anarchist.

== Career ==
McCrossin, who describes her job as "[talking] for a living", began her career in children's theatre. From the mid-1970s she has been involved with the gay liberation movement, including the 1975 demonstration outside Sunday Mass at St Mary's Cathedral against the sacking of CAMP spokesperson Mike Clohesy from his teaching position at Marist Brothers, Eastwood. She was also involved with the 1978 protests that became the Sydney Gay and Lesbian Mardi Gras, and has advocated the legalisation of same-sex marriage in Australia. McCrossin is one of the group known as the “78ers” who participated in the events in Sydney in 1978 including the first Mardi Gras, protests at Darlinghurst and Central Police Stations and Central Court, and marches through the city. In 1981 she published Women, wimmin, womyn, womin, whippets-On Lesbian Separatism, a critique of some aspects of the feminist separatist movement of the day from an anarcho-feminist perspective.

McCrossin her first broadcasting job on "Gaywaves" for the community radio station 2SER. She began working for the ABC's Radio National in 1983, initially as presenter of the women's radio program The Coming Out Show and later as the host of other programs, including "The Arts Show" and "Background Briefing". Between 2000 and 2005, she presented the social issues program "Life Matters", initially with Geraldine Doogue and later as a solo presenter. In 2005, 702 ABC Sydney chose her to replace popular host Angela Catterns in the breakfast shift, however one month after starting McCrossin resigned for health reasons (neck cancer). "I found the early hours really hard, and it's affected my health and, despite their desire for me to stay, I've made the decision that it's just not good for my health," she said.

Between 1996 and 2000, McCrossin was a weekly participant on the news-based television comedy Good News Week as captain of one of two competing teams. She was also a co-presenter of the television coverage of the 2002, 2009 and 2010 Sydney Gay and Lesbian Mardi Gras parades.

In 2009, McCrossin was named one of the 25 most influential lesbians in Australia by readers of the website samesame.com.au.

== Philanthropy ==
In 2014, McCrossin participated in a Coastrek fundraiser to promote The Fred Hollows Foundation and raise awareness of health issues within underserved communities and Indigenous Australia. With McCrossin's help, Coastrek raised $2.6 million in funds for the non-profit organization. McCrossin became a distinguished ambassador for the Fred Hollows Foundation.

== See also ==
- Anarchism in Australia
