= Good News Week =

- Good News Week logo
- Genre: Comedy; Satire
- Written by: Ian Simmons; Simon Dodd; Bruce Griffiths; Dave Bloustien; Warwick Holt; Mat Blackwell; Patrick Cook; Thomas Duncan-Watt
- Directed by: Martin Coombes
- Presented by: Paul McDermott (1996–2000, 2008–2012)
- Starring: Mikey Robins (1996–2000, 2008–2012); Claire Hooper (2008–2012); Julie McCrossin (1996–2000)
- Opening theme: "It's Good News Week" by Hedgehoppers Anonymous
- Country of origin: Australia
- Original language: English
- No. of seasons: 9
- No. of episodes: 217 (list of episodes)

Production
- Executive producer: Ted Robinson
- Producer: Jordan Robinson
- Running time: 30–90 minutes

Original release
- Network: ABC (1996–1998); Network Ten (1998–2000, 2008–2012)
- Release: 19 April 1996 – 28 April 2012

Related
- Good News Weekend; GNW Night Lite; Good News World

Good News Week is an Australian satirical panel game show hosted by Paul McDermott that aired from 19 April 1996 to 27 May 2000, and 11 February 2008 to 28 April 2012. The show's initial run aired on ABC until being bought by Network Ten in 1999. The show was revived for its second run when the 2007–2008 Writers Guild of America strike caused many of Network Ten's imported US programs to cease production.

Good News Week drew its comedy and satire from recent news stories, political figures, media organisations, and often, aspects of the show itself. The show opened with a monologue by McDermott relating to recent headlines, after which two teams of three panellists competed in recurring segments to gain points.

The show has spawned three short-lived spin-off series, the ABC's Good News Weekend (1998), Ten's GNW Night Lite (1999) and Ten's skit-based Good News World (2011).

== Format ==
Good News Week's format is based on that of the British program Have I Got News For You, although host Paul McDermott says that the idea behind the show, "of looking at the news in a satirical way, the week's events, 'this is the week that was', goes back to early radio programs." Executive producer Ted Robinson has said that the show's humour is usually less genteel than Have I Got News For You as the British series is aimed at an older, over-fifty audience whereas Good News Week is most popular among the 18 to 39 age group. "We are at the rabid mongrel end of the market," he says.

=== Monologue ===
McDermott opens each show with a scripted monologue in which he dissects newsworthy events in a humorous manner. He concludes by declaring, "and that's the good news!" and throwing his newspaper clippings in the air, after which an air cannon expels more newspaper clippings all over the stage. The episode's six panellists, divided into two teams, are then introduced. Teams are captained by the two regular panellists, radio comedian Mikey Robins and stand-up comedian Claire Hooper, who replaced stand-up comedian Julie McCrossin in the second run. The four guest panellists consist of a combination of comedians, media personalities and occasionally politicians.

=== Recurring segments ===
The monologue is followed by a number of recurring segments. Over a series of rounds, the competing teams attempt to score points by participating in games relating to the news of the week. However, McDermott often allocates additional points such as for flattery, particularly witty comments, creative incorrect answers or to orchestrate the defeat of Robins' team. Similarly, he may confiscate them such as for heckling, misbehaviour or poor, "dad joke" type humour. Each segment is concluded with a short monologue by McDermott about the news story of game, and the whole show concluded by a monologue discussing "the good news for the week ahead". Other than McDermott's monologues, the show is entirely unscripted although some parts of the show require rehearsal when using certain types of props. Each episode usually features four to six different games in addition to the regular segment "Strange But True".

== History ==
=== Initial run (1996–2000) ===
Paul McDermott hosting an episode during the show's initial run on the ABC

The series premiered on the ABC on 12 April 1996, with an initial order of 50 episodes. The ABC was initially apprehensive about executive producer Ted Robinson's choice of Paul McDermott for host. He had dreadlocks at the time, and was best known for the crude, aggressive "bad boy" character he had played in the Doug Anthony All Stars. In addition, it was doubted that he was capable of ad libbing and speaking well, as in past interviews he had usually allowed his fellow band members to do most of the talking. McDermott cut off his dreadlocks for the show and succeeded in broadening his appeal by showing a gentler, more charming side as host. He has said that although he feels there are still elements of his more aggressive character in Good News Week, they are "toned down... I've got to be the generous host now, spin-the-wheel sort of thing. I'm basing myself on Mike Brady now. I'm the disciplinarian." Mikey Robins was a part of the series from its beginning as one of the team captains. Both Amanda Keller and Anthony Ackroyd briefly participated as the second team captain before Julie McCrossin took on the role.

The show initially struggled to gain a following, and McDermott admits that the early shows were "a little wobbly" and that he was not quite sure of the role he was supposed to be playing. "After only six episodes the critics said we were goners," says Robins. "In fact, the first publicity we got said we were axed." In late 1996, while facing budget cuts, the ABC announced the cancellation of Good News Week, but later reversed the decision. The series grew in popularity and by 1997 was attracting an average of 750,000 viewers nationally, occasionally beating commercial stations in the ratings.

The show was filmed at the ABC Studios in Gore Hill for its 1996–1999 seasons, then production moved to its old home at Global Television Studios in North Ryde, for its 1999–2000 seasons.

In 1999, Network Ten purchased the rights to Good News Week in a reported $6 million deal after outbidding the Seven Network, the Nine Network and the ABC. The show's move to commercial television sparked outrage among some fans, who felt that this was a 'sell-out', but the show's staff expressed optimism about the change, describing it as a new challenge and a chance to reinvent themselves. Robins has described ABC as a channel that allows new talent to find their feet, and argued that as Good News Week had achieved this it was time to move on and make way for other performers. He added that Ten had allowed the writers great artistic freedom, perhaps even more than the ABC had permitted. "We can be even crueller about the Government without getting messages from on high," he said. The show retained all of its stars and the majority of writers and technical staff after the transition.

Among the show's guest panellists were Adam Spencer, Margaret Scott, Peter Berner, Amanda Keller, Tanya Bulmer, Anthony Morgan, Rod Quantock, Rove McManus, Johanna Griggs and Hugh Jackman, as well as several political figures such as Democrat senator Natasha Stott Despoja, then-Minister for Justice and Customs Amanda Vanstone and Deputy Prime Minister of Australia Tim Fischer. Amanda Keller, a frequent panellist, advised guests of the show to "talk, no matter what... Err on the side of verbal diarrhoea because they can always cut things out."

Ten cancelled the series in 2000, but early in 2001 announced that it had struck a deal for a limited series of Good News Week specials and debates.

=== Second run (2008–2012) ===
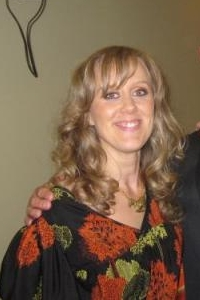
Claire Hooper replaced Julie McCrossin as a team captain.

While Network Ten had initially intended only to bring back Good News Week as a one-off special, the short supply of US shows resulting from the 2007–2008 Writers Guild of America strike caused the network to take an interest in developing more local programs and the show returned as a weekly series. The revived series premiered on 11 February 2008 with McDermott reprising his role as host. Robins returned as a team captain and comedian Claire Hooper replaced McCrossin as the opposing captain.

Many segments from the show's initial run, such as "What's the Story?", "Strange But True", "Magazine Mastermind", "Buzzers of Death" and "Warren", were largely unchanged, while others were updated or renamed such as "So You Think You Can Mime?" (formerly "Bad Street Theatre") and "Blow Up Your Pants" (formerly "Scattergories"). New segments included "Couch Potato" and "Dirty Sexy Fast Money", the show's weekly final challenge. The original theme, "It's Good News Week" by Hedgehoppers Anonymous, was also updated with a cover version performed by McDermott.

Online presence was another new aspect of the show, with full episodes, extended monologues, behind-the-scenes footage and video blogs by McDermott made viewable on the Ten website. Viewers were also able to vote online for the GNW Awards, special season finale shows offering awards for newsmakers during the year in fields such as sport, entertainment, politics and religion.

The show's return was well received, maintaining steady ratings in a competitive time slot and often being extended from 60 to 90 minutes of run time (including commercials). McDermott was also nominated for a Gold Logie Award for Most Popular Personality on Australian Television in 2010.

The show returned to its former home, at ABC Studios in Ultimo, for its 2008–2010 seasons. In 2011, production moved to Fox Studios in Sydney.

In 2011, the show was placed on hiatus following various programming changes by Network Ten. A skit-based spin-off named Good News World starring McDermott, Robins, Hooper and several regular Good News Week guests, was produced for the later half of 2011. Neither show was renewed for 2012, however a finale special for Good News Week was filmed at the 2012 Melbourne International Comedy Festival and televised on 28 April.

== Spin-offs ==
=== Good News Weekend (1998) ===
In 1998, a ten-week series entitled Good News Weekend aired on the ABC in the Saturday night time slot usually occupied by Roy and HG, who were away working in Britain at the time. The show was hosted by McDermott and featured regular team captains Robins and McCrossin. Unlike the weekly show, Good News Weekend was focussed more strongly on popular culture than the news and frequently featured musical guests and stand-up performers. The shows were broadcast live, with the exception of a few prerecorded sketches.

=== GNW Night Lite (1999) ===
During 1999, a second spin-off was created for Network Ten. GNW Night Lite featured the regular cast, in addition to Flacco and The Sandman. Like Good News Weekend, it was focussed on music and variety and games tended to relate to popular culture rather than current events. There would also generally be a musical act and Flacco and The Sandman would perform humorous monologues and dialogues between segments. McDermott describes the show as having been "a fairly radical departure" and says that they initially struggled with it, but by 2000 had found a combination with which they were comfortable.

=== Good News World (2011) ===
In 2011, Network Ten announced they would be resting the Good News Week panel format and introducing a skit-based spin-off titled Good News World. McDermott, Robins and Hooper returned as regular cast members, along with Good News Week regulars Tom Gleeson, Akmal Saleh, Cal Wilson, Sammy J and Randy. The show was poorly received, with criticisms centring on its scripted nature and lack of spontaneity in comparison to the original Good News Week format.

== Other media ==
Several items of merchandise were available from ABC stores including

- Two books (Good News Week Book One, Good News Week Book Two)
- Two CDs (Paul McDermott Unplugged: The Good News Week Tapes Volume 1, and Live Songs from Good News Week: The Good News Week Tapes Volume 2)
- VHS video (Good News Week: Unseen and Obscene).

== Reception ==
=== Logie Awards ===
In 1999 and 2000, Good News Week was nominated for two Logie Awards in the categories of Most Popular Comedy Program and Most Outstanding Comedy Program. Host, Paul McDermott was nominated for the Gold Logie award in 2010 for his role on this show.

=== ARIA Music Awards ===
The ARIA Music Awards are a set of annual ceremonies presented by Australian Recording Industry Association (ARIA), which recognise excellence, innovation, and achievement across all genres of the music of Australia. They commenced in 1987.

Year	Nominee / work	Award	Result	Ref.
1998	Unplugged Good News Week Tapes Volume 1	ARIA Award for Best Comedy Release	Won	

== See also ==
- List of Australian television series
- List of Good News Week episodes
- List of Good News Week spin-off series episodes
