= Melbourne International Comedy Festival Gala =

Annual fund-raising live comedy show in Melbourne, Australia

The Melbourne International Comedy Festival Gala, or Oxfam Gala, is a comedy show run annually as part of the Melbourne International Comedy Festival. Billed as Australian comedy's 'night of nights', it is held one week before the festival opens, and acts as a fundraiser for the charity Oxfam Australia.

== List of performers by year ==
=== 1991 ===
Host:

- David Strassman
- Gerry Connolly
- Gina Riley & Tina Arena
- Glenn Robbins & Mary-Anne Fahey
- Jane Turner & Peter Moon
- Kym Gyngell
- Magda Szubanski & Alan Pentland
- Marg Downey
- Matt Parkinson & Greg Fleet
- Nick Giannopoulos & Michael Veitch
- Norman Gunston
- Rachel Berger
- Sean Hughes
- Shane Bourne
- Steve Blackburn & Geoff Brooks
- Terry Jones
- The D-Generation (Rob Sitch, Santo Cilauro & Tom Gleisner)
- Wendy Harmer

=== 1992 ===
Host: Shane Bourne

- Agro
- Bea Arthur
- Chris Lynam
- David Strassman
- George Kapiniaris
- Georgie Parker
- Gerry Connolly (as Elizabeth II)
- Jane Turner (as Bobbie Battista)
- Jimeoin
- Kate Raison
- Libbi Gorr (as Elle McFeast) with Janine De Lorenzo
- Nick Giannopoulos
- Rachel Berger
- Scared Weird Little Guys
- Simon Hill (as Paul Keating)
- Stomp
- The Blakeney Twins
- The Found Objects (Colin Lane, Frank Woodley & Scott Casley)
- Tiny Tim
- Effie (Mary Coustas)
- Trevor Marmalade

=== 1993 ===
Host: Gerry Connolly and Ernie Dingo

- Andy Goodone
- Anthony Morgan
- Chris Lynam
- Darren Casey
- Greg Champion
- Jimeoin
- Judith Lucy
- Lano & Woodley
- Lenny Henry
- Marty Putz
- Mary Coustas (as Effie)
- Rachel Berger
- Sal Upton
- Sean Hughes
- Shane Bourne
- Simon Hill (as Jeff Kennett)
- Stomp
- The Amazing Johnathan
- The Empty Pockets (Greg Fleet & Matt Quartermaine)
- The Scared Weird Little Guys

=== 1994 ===
Host: Wendy Harmer

- Bobcat Goldthwait
- Ennio Marchetto
- Flacco (Paul Livingston)
- Franklyn Ajaye
- Glynn Nicholas
- Jack Dee
- Jimeoin
- Judith Lucy
- Kinky Friedman
- Lano & Woodley
- Leslie Nielsen
- New Joke City (Greg Fleet, Marty Sheargold & Matt King)
- No Dangly Bits (Robyn Butler & Jeanette Cronin)
- Olé
- Phil Kay
- Steady Eddy
- The Amazing Johnathan
- Tokyo Shock Boys
- Tom Kenny

=== 1995 ===
Host: Andrew Denton featuring Magda Szubanski

- Alan Davies
- Anthony Morgan
- Brian Nankervis
- Emo Philips
- Flacco
- Glynn Nicholas
- Jack Dee
- Judith Lucy
- Lano & Woodley
- Lee Evans
- Lynda Gibson
- Rachel Berger
- Robyn Butler
- Scott Capurro
- Sean Hughes
- Steady Eddy
- Steve Kearney
- The 3 Canadians
- Scared Weird Little Guys
- Vince Sorrenti

=== 1996 ===
Host: Julia Morris featuring Bruno Lucia

- Bill Bailey
- Bob Downe
- Bob Franklin & Matt King
- Ed Byrne
- Flacco
- Fred Rowan
- Greg Fleet
- Jimeoin
- Lano & Woodley
- Paul McDermott & Mosh
- Poulter & Duff
- Rich Hall
- Rudy Coby
- Scared Weird Little Guys
- Scott Capurro
- Wadaiko Ichiro

=== 1997 ===
Host: Judith Lucy and Shane Bourne

- Bill Bailey
- Boothby Graffoe
- Corky and the Juice Pigs
- Dame Sybil (Seán Cullen)
- Ed Byrne
- Frank Skinner
- Greg Fleet
- Greg Proops
- Hung Le
- Jeff Green
- Lano & Woodley
- Peter Berner
- Rhona Cameron
- Rich Hall
- Rod Quantock
- Scared Weird Little Guys
- Umbilical Brothers

=== 1998 ===
Host: Paul McDermott

- Al Murray The Pub Landlord
- Alan Parker - Urban Warrior (Simon Munnery)
- Anthony Morgan
- Dave O'Neil
- Bob Downe (Mark Trevorrow)
- Ed Byrne
- Greg Fleet
- James O'Loghlin
- John Hegley
- Julian Clary
- Matt King
- Owen O'Neill
- Parsons and Naylor
- STOMP
- The Fabulous Singlettes
- The Nualas
- Scared Weird Little Guys
- The Three Canadians
- Tokyo Shock Boys
- Wil Anderson

=== 1999 ===
Host: Rove McManus

- Jeff Green
- Carl Barron
- Judith Lucy
- Drew Fraser
- Lano & Woodley
- Adam Bloom
- Matt King
- Patrice O'Neal
- Scared Weird Little Guys
- Greg Fleet
- The League Against Tedium (Simon Munnery)
- Rachel Berger
- Dave Hughes
- Jimeoin
- Franklyn Ajaye
- Wil Anderson
- Dave O'Neil
- James O'Loghlin
- David Strassman
- Keith Robinson
- Lynn Ferguson
- Tripod

=== 2000 ===
Host: Lano & Woodley

- Adam Bloom
- Arctic Boosh
- Arj Barker
- Boothby Graffoe & Phil Moriarty
- Carl Barron
- Cool Heat Urban Beat
- Dave Hughes
- Dave O'Neil
- Denise Scott
- Greg Fleet
- Johnny Vegas
- Kitty Flanagan
- Lano & Woodley
- Margaret Smith
- Matt King
- Peter Berner
- Peter Helliar
- Rachel Berger
- Sarah Kendall
- Scared Weird Little Guys
- Stewart Lee
- Tom Rhodes
- Tripod
- Wil Anderson

=== 2001 ===
Host: Jimeoin

- Adam Hills
- Arj Barker
- Auto Boosh
- Chris Addison
- Dave Gorman
- Dave Hughes
- Dave O'Neil
- Deirdre O'Kane
- Greg Fleet
- Jeff Green
- Jenny Eclair
- Jimeoin
- Johnny Vegas
- Judith Lucy
- Lano & Woodley
- Miss Itchy
- Peter Helliar
- Rich Hall aka Otis Lee Crenshaw
- Rod Quantock
- Sarah Kendall
- Tripod
- Wil Anderson

=== 2002 ===
Host: Wil Anderson

- Al Murray
- Bob Downe
- Carl Barron
- Chris Addison
- Daniel Kitson
- Dave Hughes
- Hattie Hayridge
- John Hegley
- Lano & Woodley
- Paul McDermott
- Peter Helliar
- Rachel Berger
- René Hicks
- Tony Woods
- Tripod
- Umbilical Brothers

=== 2003 ===
Host: Dave Hughes

- Arj Barker
- Boothby Graffoe
- Cal Wilson
- Dan Antopolski
- Damian Callinan
- Daniel Kitson
- Danny Bhoy
- Dave Callan
- Dave Hughes
- Dave O'Neil
- Fiona O'Loughlin
- Flight of the Conchords
- Francesca Martinez
- Glenn Wool
- Jimeoin
- Lawrence Mooney
- Lee Mack
- Men in Coats
- Mike Wilmot
- Noel Fielding
- Paul McDermott and GUD
- Sarah Kendall
- Tom Gleeson
- Tripod
- Wil Anderson

=== 2004 ===
Host: Magda Szubanski

- Adam Hills
- Akmal Saleh
- Chris Addison
- Daniel Kitson
- Danny Bhoy
- Dave Hughes
- Denise Scott
- Fiona O'Loughlin
- Greg fleet
- Howard Read (as Big Howard Little Howard)
- Lano & Woodley
- Lee Mack
- Maria Bamford
- Meshel Laurie
- Paul McDermott and GUD
- Rob Rouse
- Sarah Kendall
- Scared Weird Little Guys
- The Schneedles
- Todd Barry
- Tom Gleeson
- Tripod
- Wil Anderson

=== 2005 ===
Host: Dave Hughes

- Adam Hills
- Akmal Saleh
- Arj Barker
- Bill Bailey
- Bob Downe
- Chris Addison
- Danny Bhoy
- Dave O'Neil
- Demetri Martin
- Denise Scott
- Eddie Perfect
- Paul McDermott and GUD
- Jason Byrne
- Jeff Green
- Jimeoin
- Maria Bamford
- Mike Wilmot
- Rich Hall
- Scott Brennan & Cal Wilson
- Sean Lock
- Stephen K Amos
- The Kransky Sisters
- Tripod
- Umbilical Brothers
- Wil Anderson

=== 2006 ===
Host: Adam Hills

- Arj Barker
- Cal Wilson
- Charlie Pickering
- Corinne Grant
- Danny Bhoy
- Dave Hughes
- David O'Doherty
- Demetri Martin
- Dylan Moran
- Fiona O'Loughlin
- Freestyle Love Supreme
- Jason Byrne
- Jimeoin & Bob Franklin
- Judith Lucy
- Lano and Woodley
- Rich Hall and Mike Wilmot
- Stephen K Amos
- Tim Minchin
- Tripod
- Wil Anderson

=== 2007 ===
Host: Peter Helliar

- Adam Hills
- Ardal O'Hanlon
- Corinne Grant
- Dave Hughes
- David O'Doherty
- Ed Byrne
- Fiona O'Loughlin
- Greg Fleet with Mick Moriarty
- Jason Byrne
- Jeff Green
- The cast of Keating!
- Mark Watson
- Phil Nichol
- Russell Howard
- Shappi Khorsandi
- Stephen K. Amos
- Puppet Up: The Jim Henson Puppet Company
- Tim Minchin
- Tom Gleeson
- Tripod
- Wil Anderson

=== 2008 ===
Host: Paul McDermott

- Arj Barker
- Charlie Pickering
- Dave Hughes
- David O'Doherty
- Des Bishop
- Fiona O'Loughlin
- Frank Woodley
- Glenn Wool
- Jason Byrne
- Jeff Green
- Julia Morris
- Kristen Schaal and Kurt Braunohler
- Mark Watson
- Nina Conti
- Phil Nichol
- Reginald D Hunter
- Rove McManus
- Sean Choolburra
- Shane Warne: The Musical (Eddie Perfect)
- Shappi Khorsandi
- Stephen K Amos
- Tom Gleeson
- Tripod
- Umbilical Brothers
- Wil Anderson

=== 2009 ===
Host: Shaun Micallef

- Adam Hills
- Arj Barker
- Brendon Burns
- Charlie Pickering
- Chooky Dancers
- Dave Hughes
- Denise Scott
- Des Bishop
- Fiona O'Loughlin
- Hannah Gadsby
- James Galea
- Jamie Kilstein
- Jason Byrne
- Jimeoin
- Josh Thomas
- Josie Long
- Judith Lucy
- Mike Wilmot
- Nina Conti
- Otis Lee Crenshaw
- Russell Kane
- Sammy J
- Sarah Millican
- Tim Minchin
- Tim Vine
- Tom Gleeson

=== 2010 ===
Host: Kitty Flanagan

- Aamer Rahman
- Andrew O'Neill
- Arj Barker
- Bobby Spade
- Damian Callinan
- Felicity Ward
- Frank Woodley
- Hannah Gadsby
- Jamie Kilstein
- Jason Byrne
- Jimeoin
- Jon Richardson
- Josh Thomas
- Nina Conti
- The Pajama Men
- Russell Kane
- Sam Simmons
- Sarah Millican
- Tim Vine
- Tom Gleeson
- Tripod
- Wil Anderson

=== 2011 ===
Host: Josh Thomas

- Bob Franklin
- Cal Wilson
- Caroline Rhea
- Dave Thornton
- Dead Cat Bounce
- Denise Scott
- Doc Brown
- Eddie Perfect
- Hannibal Buress
- Jason Byrne
- Maria Bamford
- Moshe Kasher
- Paul F. Tompkins
- Reginald D Hunter
- Russell Kane
- Stephen K Amos
- Steve Hughes
- The Bedroom Philosopher
- Tom Gleeson
- Wil Anderson

=== 2012 ===
Host: Sammy J & Randy

- Cal Wilson
- Celia Pacquola
- Dave Hughes
- Dave Thornton
- David Callan
- David O'Doherty
- DeAnne Smith
- Dixie Longate
- Fiona O'Loughlin
- Frank Woodley
- Glenn Wool
- Greg Fleet and Mick Moriarty
- Hannah Gadsby
- Jason Byrne
- Keith Robinson
- Mike Wilmot
- Paul Foot
- Peter Helliar
- Sarah Kendall
- Stephen K Amos
- Tom Ballard
- Tom Green

=== 2013 ===
Host: Dave Hughes

- Arj Barker
- Cal Wilson
- Dave Callan
- Dave Hughes
- Dave Thornton
- Hannah Gadsby
- Idiots of Ants
- Jimmy McGhie
- Josh Thomas
- Kitty Flanagan
- Loretta Maine
- Matt Okine
- Paul Foot
- Peter Helliar
- Ronny Chieng
- Sarah Millican
- Sean Choolburra
- Steve Hughes
- Stephen K Amos
- The Kransky Sisters
- Tom Ballard
- Tommy Little
- Urzila Carlson

=== 2014 ===
Host: Eddie Perfect

- Celia Pacquola
- Denise Scott
- Doc Brown
- Eddie Ifft
- Eddie Perfect, Tripod & The MSO Chorus
- Felicity Ward
- Fiona O'Loughlin
- Frank Woodley
- Jason Byrne
- Jeff Green
- Joel Creasey
- Lawrence Mooney
- Luke McGregor
- Matt Okine
- Max & Ivan
- Milton Jones
- Paul Foot
- Ronny Chieng
- Sammy J & Randy
- The Boy With Tape On His Face
- Tom Ballard
- Tom Gleeson
- Urzila Carlson

=== 2015 ===
Host: Joel Creasey

- Arj Barker
- Celia Pacquola
- Dave Hughes
- Dave Thornton
- Fiona O'Loughlin
- Hannah Gadsby
- James Acaster
- Jason Byrne
- Jeff Green
- Joel Creasey
- Lawrence Mooney
- Luisa Omielan
- Matt Okine
- Max & Ivan
- Mike Wilmot
- Nazeem Hussain
- ONGALS
- Pajama Men
- Paul Foot
- Puddles
- Ronny Chieng
- Sammy J & Randy
- Tom Ballard
- Tommy Little
- Urzila Carlson

=== 2016 ===
Host: Celia Pacquola

- Anne Edmonds
- Arj Barker
- Andy Saunders
- Daniel Sloss
- Dave Hughes
- Dave Thornton
- David O'Doherty
- Frank Woodley
- Hal Cruttenden
- Ivan Aristeguieta
- Jake Johannsen
- Jeff Green
- Joel Creasey
- Joel Dommett
- Luisa Omielan
- Matt Okine
- Nazeem Hussain
- Rhys Nicholson
- Rich Hall
- Sammy J & Randy
- Steen Raskopoulos
- Stephen K Amos
- Tommy Little

=== 2017 ===
Host: Wil Anderson

- Anne Edmonds
- Arj Barker
- Aunty Donna
- Cal Wilson
- Damien Power
- Daniel Connell
- Daniel Sloss
- DeAnne Smith
- Demi Lardner
- Frank Woodley
- Ivan Aristeguieta
- Jason Byrne
- Joel Creasey
- Lawrence Mooney
- Loyiso Gola
- Luke McGregor
- Mae Martin
- Matt Okine
- Nick Cody
- Paul Foot
- Rhys Nicholson
- Sammy J
- Stephen K Amos
- Stuart Goldsmith
- Tommy Little
- Urzila Carlson

=== 2018 ===
Host: Matt Okine

- Arj Barker
- Becky Lucas
- Briefs
- Cal Wilson
- Carl Donnelly
- Dane Simpson
- Dave Hughes
- Dave Thornton
- DeAnne Smith
- Douglas Lim
- Geraldine Hickey
- James Galea
- Jeff Green
- Joel Creasey
- Lady Rizo
- Loyiso Gola
- Luke Heggie
- Nath Valvo
- Phil Wang
- Rich Hall
- Sam Simmons
- Sammy J & Randy
- Stephen K Amos
- Tom Gleeson
- Tommy Little
- Urzila Carlson

=== 2019 ===
Host: Tom Gleeson

- Anne Edmonds
- Becky Lucas
- Damien Power
- Daniel Connell
- Dave Thornton
- DeAnne Smith
- Douglas Lim
- Fern Brady
- Geraldine Hickey
- Guy Montgomery
- John Hastings
- Larry Dean
- Mel Buttle
- Nath Valvo
- Nazeem Hussain
- Nikki Britton
- Georgie Carroll
- Paul Foot
- Phil Wang
- Rhys Nicholson
- Sam Campbell & Paul Williams
- Steph Tisdell
- Tommy Little
- You Am I

=== 2020 ===
The 2020 festival was cancelled in its entirety due to concerns surrounding COVID-19 and the extension of restrictions relating to efforts to stem the spread of the pandemic in Australia.

=== 2021 ===
Host: Becky Lucas

- Aaron Chen
- Andy Saunders
- Arj Barker
- Blake Freeman
- Carl Donnelly
- Dane Simpson
- Daniel Connell
- Dave Thornton
- David Quirk
- Georgie Carroll
- Geraldine Hickey
- Joel Creasey
- Jude Perl
- Lizzy Hoo
- Lloyd Langford
- Nick Cody
- Nikki Britton
- Randy Feltface
- Reuben Kaye
- Sam Taunton
- Tommy Little
- Tripod
- Zoë Coombs Marr

=== 2022 ===
Host: Steph Tisdell

- Alex Ward
- Andy Saunders
- Blake Freeman
- Brett Blake
- Chris Ryan
- Claire Hooper
- Fern Brady
- Geraldine Hickey
- Hot Brown Honey: The Remix
- Lano & Woodley
- Lizzy Hoo
- Lloyd Langford
- Luke Heggie
- Melanie Bracewell
- Nath Valvo
- Nazeem Hussain
- Nick Cody
- Nikki Britton
- Sam Campbell
- Sam Taunton
- Sammy J
- Stephen K Amos
- Tommy Little
- Tripod

=== 2023 ===
Host: Luke McGregor

- Aboriginal Comedy Allstars
- Alex Ward
- Blake Freeman
- Brett Blake
- Cal Wilson
- David Quirk
- Deadly Funny National Grand Final
- Geraldine Hickey
- Ivan Aristeguieta
- Jason Leong
- Jordan Gray
- Josie Long
- Larry Dean
- Lizzy Hoo
- Lloyd Langford
- Luke Heggie
- Mark Watson
- Michael Hing
- Nikki Britton
- Paul Foot
- Sam Campbell
- Sammy J
- Scout Boxall
- Sean Choolburra
- Takashi Wakasugi
- Tommy Little

=== 2024 ===
Host: Lizzy Hoo

- Aboriginal Comedy Allstars
- Cameron James
- Celia Pacquola
- Dane Simpson & His Dad
- Daniel Connell
- Dave Thornton
- Dilruk Jayasinha
- Ed Byrne
- Emma Holland
- Felicity Ward
- Fern Brady
- Gillian Cosgriff
- He Huang
- Ivan Aristeguieta
- Kirsty Webeck
- Lewis Garnham
- Mel Buttle
- Nath Valvo
- Nazeem Hussain
- Ray O'Leary
- Reuben Kaye
- Rhys Nicholson
- Takashi Wakasugi
- Tom Ballard
- Tommy Little

=== 2025 ===
Host: Mel Buttle

- Blake Freeman
- Bron Lewis
- Cameron James
- Chloe Petts
- Chris Parker
- Daniel Connell
- Geraldine Hickey
- Gillian Cosgriff
- Ivan Aristeguieta
- Jenny Tian
- Josh Glanc
- Leon Filewood
- Luke McGregor
- Mark Watson
- Melanie Bracewell
- Noah Szto
- Rahul Subramanian
- Ray O'Leary
- Sammy J
- Sara Pascoe
- Schalk Bezuidenhout
- Tommy Little
- Urzila Carlson
