= Aussie Gold =

- Genre: Comedy
- Created by: Darren Chau
- Written by: Frank Woodley
- Presented by: Frank Woodley
- Country of origin: Australia
- Original language: English

Production
- Executive producer: Darren Chau
- Producer: Anthony Warrington
- Production locations: Melbourne, Victoria
- Running time: 3 hours (including commercials)

Original release
- Network: the Comedy Channel
- Release: 26 September 2008

Aussie Gold is a television programme on Foxtel's The Comedy Channel, created and executive produced by Darren Chau, produced by Anthony Warrington, and hosted by Australian comedian Frank Woodley. The show hosts a programming block celebrating the very best in Australian comedy. The weekly programme has also featured special editions such as ANZAC Gold and the 20th Anniversary celebrations of Fast Forward.

An Aussie Gold promo starring Peter Helliar won Silver at the 2011 Australian Promax Awards.

== Featured programming ==
- The Comedy Company
- Jimeoin
- Big Girl's Blouse
- Blankety Blanks
- Fast Forward
- Kingswood Country
- The Adventures of Lano and Woodley
- We Can Be Heroes: Finding The Australian of the Year
- The Norman Gunston Show
- The Games
- Mother and Son
