= Vermont Secondary College =

Coordinates: 37°50′41″S 145°12′01″E

- Vermont, Victoria; Australia

Information
- Type: Public
- Motto: Lift Up Thine Eyes
- Established: 1962
- Principal: Tony Jacobs
- Enrolment: 1,287
- Campus: Suburban
- Colours: Navy blue and white
- Website: vermontsc.vic.edu.au

Vermont Secondary College is a state high school located in the eastern Melbourne suburb of Vermont, Victoria, Australia. It is accredited under Australia's Department of Education's CRICOS system.

Vermont Secondary College opened as Vermont High School in 1962. The school buildings were constructed in stages between 1962 and 1970 using the Light Timber Construction (LTC) design of the Victorian Public Works Department. Upon completion, two classroom wings (designated "N" and "C") and a technical wing (designated "S") were constructed. In later years, a gymnasium/canteen complex was added, partially funded by the former City of Nunawading, along with a football/cricket oval and a soccer field. The school changed its name to Vermont Secondary College in 1991.

The school has recently undergone significant renovations, with two of the three LTC wings experiencing significant remodelling and partial demolition, and a fourth wing consisting of 12 portable classrooms being added. The grounds have also been improved, including a fenced artificial surface soccer pitch and a new set of asphalt netball/basketball courts with line markings for tennis as well.

In 2010, the school structure was significantly altered with the introduction of a house system consisting of three houses: Hotham (Blue house), Macedon (Green house) and Stirling (Red house). Each house is named after mountains to align with the school's previous tradition. Each house has a male and female house captain from year 12, along with two school captains, a male and a female, chosen from year 12.

== Notable alumni ==
- Gillian Armstrong – Director
- Nathan Lovejoy - Actor
- Jocelyn Moorhouse – Writer/Director
- Thornhill (band) - members attended this school
- Waleed Aly- radio and TV presenter
