= Sammy J & Randy in Ricketts Lane =

2015 Australian comedy TV series

- Created by: Sammy J Heath McIvor
- Written by: Sammy J Heath McIvor
- Directed by: Jonathan Brough
- Starring: Sammy J Heath McIvor; Nathan Lovejoy; Georgia Chara; Sam Healy
- No. of seasons: 1
- No. of episodes: 6

Production
- Producer: Donna Andrews
- Running time: 28 minutes

Original release
- Network: ABC Television

Sammy J & Randy in Ricketts Lane is a six-part Australian television comedy series starring comedian Sammy J and Randy, a purple puppet, which aired in September 2015 on ABC TV.

== Plot ==
Sammy J is a hopeless lawyer who six years into his legal career has yet to win a case. This is not helped by his tendency to wet himself in court, nor the relentless bullying of his sadistic boss Borkman. Randy (the purple puppet) hit rock bottom after the divorce from his wife, the host of a top-rating current affairs program, "Thumbs Down with Victoria Vincent". Apart from cheating on his wife, Randy's hobbies included gambling, drinking, and cheating on his wife. After Sammy J managed to lose him everything in the divorce case, he offered his spare room at Ricketts Lane to Randy for a fortnight but that was twelve months ago.

== Cast ==
- Sammy J as Sammy J
- Heath McIvor as Randy
- Georgia Chara as Wednesday
- Nathan Lovejoy as Borkman
- Sam Healy as Victoria Vincent
- Dilruk Jayasinha as Michael
- Francis Greenslade as Judge

== Episodes ==
The episode titles are all taken from films starring Kevin Costner.

No.	Title	Directed by	Written by	Original release date	Aus. viewers (millions)
1	"The Postman"	Jonathan Brough	Sammy J and Randy	14 October 2015	0.326
Confronted by the questions on the census, Sammy J and Randy compete over who can tick more boxes. Sammy J still hasn't won a case at work, and Randy is struggling to get over the demise of his marriage.
2	"Field of Dreams"	Jonathan Brough	Sammy J and Randy	21 October 2015	0.262
When Randy's attempts to spy on his ex-wife are foiled by a tree, he enlists Sammy J's legal expertise to have it removed.
3	"The Bodyguard"	Jonathan Brough	Sammy J and Randy	28 October 2015	0.212
When Sammy J becomes paranoid that an ex-client is trying to kill him, Randy convinces him to procure some high-tech surveillance equipment.
4	"Waterworld"	Jonathan Brough	Sammy J and Randy	4 November 2015	0.228
When Sammy J's job is readvertised, Randy seizes the opportunity to fulfill his welfare requirements.
5	"Dances with Wolves"	Jonathan Brough	Sammy J and Randy	11 November 2015	0.184
A freshly unemployed Sammy J arranges an overnight stakeout to catch a neighbour dumping rubbish in their bin. In the absence of a job, Sammy J throws everything into his quest to capture the Bin Bandit.
6	"Malibu Hot Summer"	Jonathan Brough	Sammy J and Randy	18 November 2015	0.156
Sammy J attempts to win his job back by prosecuting his best friend Randy.

== Broadcast ==
The six-part series was made available on ABC iview on 1 September 2015, and aired on ABC TV from 14 October 2015. It is described as a sitcom with songs and puppetry, aimed at an adult audience.

In the United States, the series aired on Seeso.

== Home media ==
A DVD containing all six episodes from the series was released by Roadshow Entertainment in Australia on 25 November 2015.

== Awards ==
- 2016: Australian Directors Guild Award, for Best Direction in a TV Comedy, for episode 1 (Jonathan Brough)

== See also ==
- List of Australian television series
- List of programs broadcast by ABC (Australian TV network)
