= Mal Webb =

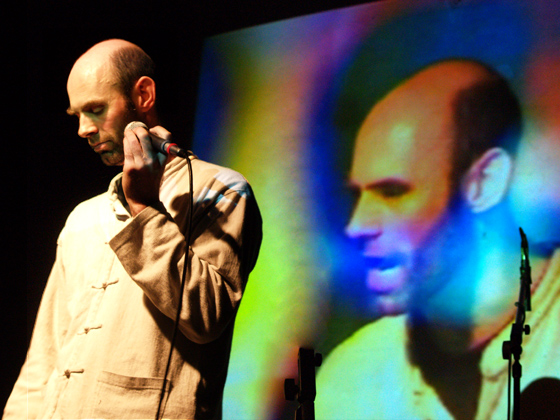
- Mal Webb, Revolver South Yarra, 12 June 2006

Background information
- Born: 31 October 1966 (age 60); Melbourne, Victoria, Australia
- Genres: Pop, jazz, world music, Ghanaian music, a cappella
- Occupations: Musician, songwriter, comedian
- Instruments: Vocals; beatboxing; overtone singing; piano; trombone; guitar; bass guitar; trumpet; kalimba; harmonica
- Years active: 1984–present
- Formerly of: Totally Gourdgeous, The Oxo Cubans, Sock, Formidable Vegetable
- Website: malwebb.com

Mal Webb (born 31 October 1966, Melbourne, Australia) is a singer, beatboxer and multi-instrumentalist who has performed in various groups in the Australian music scene.

He records his own original songs as well as providing material for other artists. He is a founding member of the Oxo Cubans, Sock, Totally Gourdgeous, and Formidable Vegetable, as well as performing solo and as a duo with Kylie Morrigan. As a composer, he provided the soundtracks for The Adventures of Lano and Woodley (ABC TV series 1997–1999), Woodley (ABC TV series 2012) and Wishworks' puppet show, Whispering Smith (UK 2015). In 2018, he premiered his work, "Notey and Noisy, a Sound Science Mathemusical", which was released on July 5, 2024 on CD and streaming services, and as a Digital Download on Bandcamp. His yodelling vocal technique has been studied using endoscopy.

== Solo discography ==
- Trainer Wheels (2000)
- 3 Cheers for Peace & Quiet (2005)
- Dodgy (2008)
- Live and Instructional DVD (2011)
- Not Nor Mal (2016)
- Pod (2025)
