= Sammy J =

Australian comedian

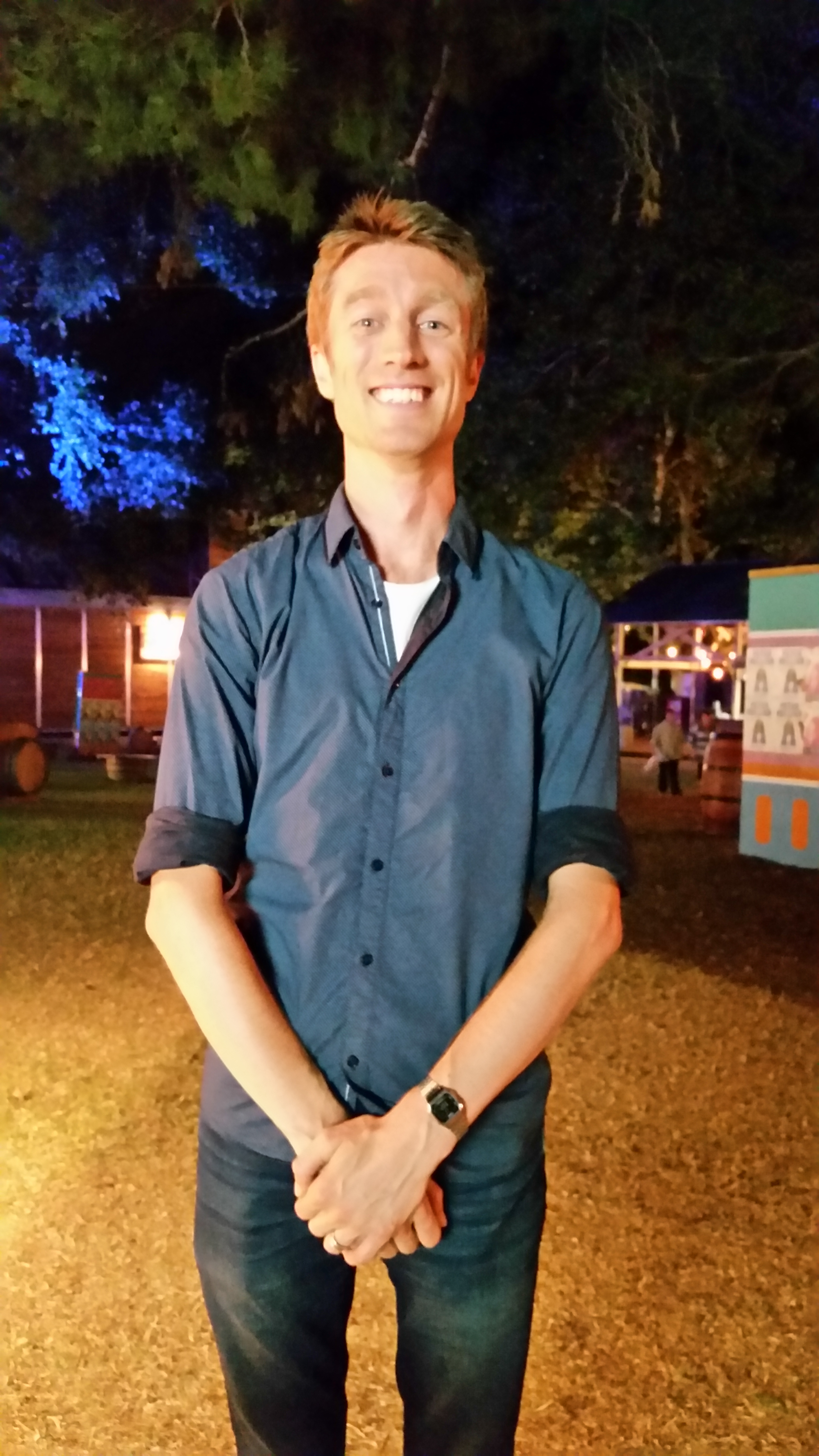
- Sammy J in the Garden of Unearthly Delights at the 2018 Adelaide Fringe Festival.
- Born: Samuel Jonathan McMillan; Mornington, Victoria, Australia
- Other name: Sammy J

Comedy career
- Years active: 2003-present
- Medium: Stand-up, radio, television
- Genre: Comedy music
- Website: www.sammy-j.com

Samuel Jonathan McMillan is an Australian musical comedian, satirist, writer and radio presenter who performs under the stage name Sammy J. He embraces a variety of media in his comedy, including the use of video and self-composed music, and frequently collaborates with Australian puppet comedian Randy Feltface. He has released several CDs and DVD compilations of his work. He has performed at comedy festivals in Australia, Edinburgh and Montreal, and has appeared on various Australian television shows, including Sammy J & Randy in Ricketts Lane, a sitcom based on the duo's touring show of the same name.

== Early life and education ==
Samuel Jonathan McMillan was born in Mornington, Victoria.

He studied law at the University of Melbourne for two and a half years, where he directed and appeared in the Melbourne Law Comedy Revue. He was a member of United Nations Youth Australia and was editor of its newsletter in 1999 and 2000. He says he was more interested in writing jokes than studying, and halfway through the course decided to drop out. He subsequently graduated with a Bachelor of Arts (Media and Communications) in 2006 and began to pursue a full-time comedy career.

He performs under the stage name "Sammy J", an old high school nickname and contraction of his full name, Samuel Jonathan McMillan. The first time he publicly used the stage name was during a performance on Hey Hey It's Saturday's "Red Faces" segment in 1999.

== Solo career ==
In 2006, McMillan took the Best Newcomer award at the Melbourne International Comedy Festival for his debut solo show, Sammy J's 55 Minute National Tour. In 2009, McMillan created a one-man musical comedy show inspired by his schooldays titled 1999. In 2011 he featured in an episode of ABC TV's Comedy Warehouse series, and in 2012 headlined the inaugural Jakarta Fringe Festival alongside Bill Bailey. In 2017 his solo show Hero Complex toured Australia, telling the story of his childhood love of The Phantom. The show won Best Comedy at the Melbourne Fringe Festival and McMillan was nominated for Best Comedy Performer at the 2017 Helpmann Awards.

He has appeared on various Australian television shows including Spicks and Specks, Good News Week and Talkin' 'Bout Your Generation, and wrote and performed on The Comedy Channel's satirical news show The Mansion. In 2013 he hosted Wednesday Night Fever, a satirical sketch show on ABC television, conducting interviews and performing songs based on the week's news. During the 2016 Australian federal election, McMillan created and hosted Sammy J's Playground Politics, a series of political satire shorts on ABC iview in the style of Play School, which became a recurring segment on his own show Sammy J's Democratic Party, premiering in May 2017.

In 2018, McMillan inherited the Clarke and Dawe time slot on ABC television, performing a weekly satirical sketch before the news. Popular characters from this series include the "Government Coach" and "National Yoga". His comedic responses to the COVID-19 pandemic have attracted millions of views online.

McMillan is an ambassador for both Oxfam Australia and the youth mentoring organisation Big Brothers Big Sisters Australia.

In April 2018, he released his first book, The Long Class Goodnight, under his stage name Sammy J.

From 2016 to 2017 he went on a national tour of Australia and licked every state parliament building, ending the tour by licking Parliament House, Canberra.

In November 2019, the ABC announced that McMillan would host ABC Radio Melbourne's Breakfast show from 20 January 2020, replacing Jacinta Parsons and Sami Shah. Sammy J left his role in December 2024 after five years.

In May 2020, McMillan's song "Pink Clouds" was announced as the winner of the International Songwriting Competition, in the comedy category.

Some of McMillan's influences include Lano and Woodley, Tom Lehrer, Tony Martin, Shaun Micallef and Adam Hills.

== Releases ==
Sammy J has released several CDs and DVD compilations of his work, including the album Symphony in J Minor which was nominated for Best Comedy Release at the 2019 ARIA Awards.

== Collaboration ==
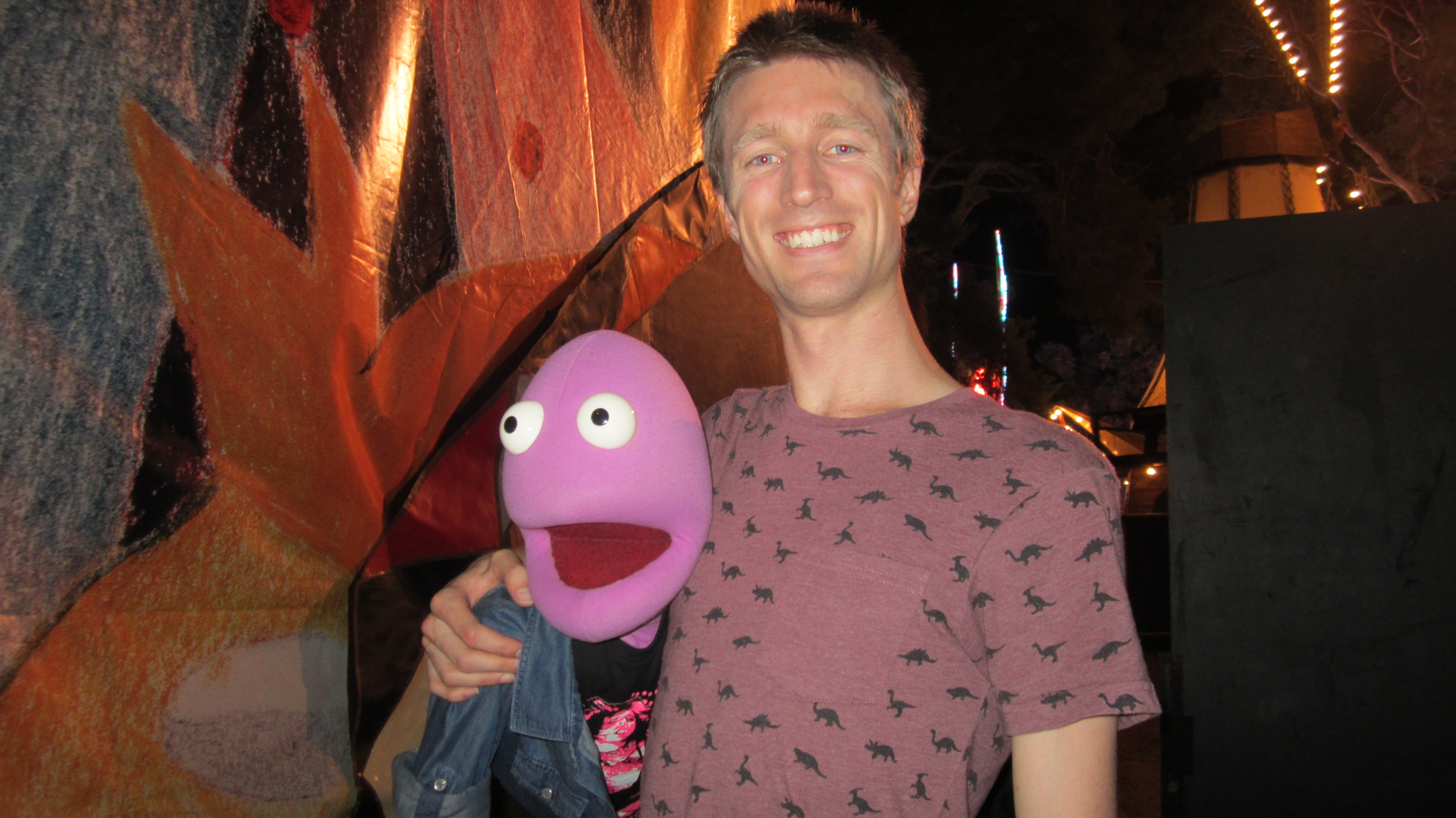
Randy (left) and Sammy J post-show in the Garden of Unearthly Delights at the 2016 Adelaide Fringe Festival.

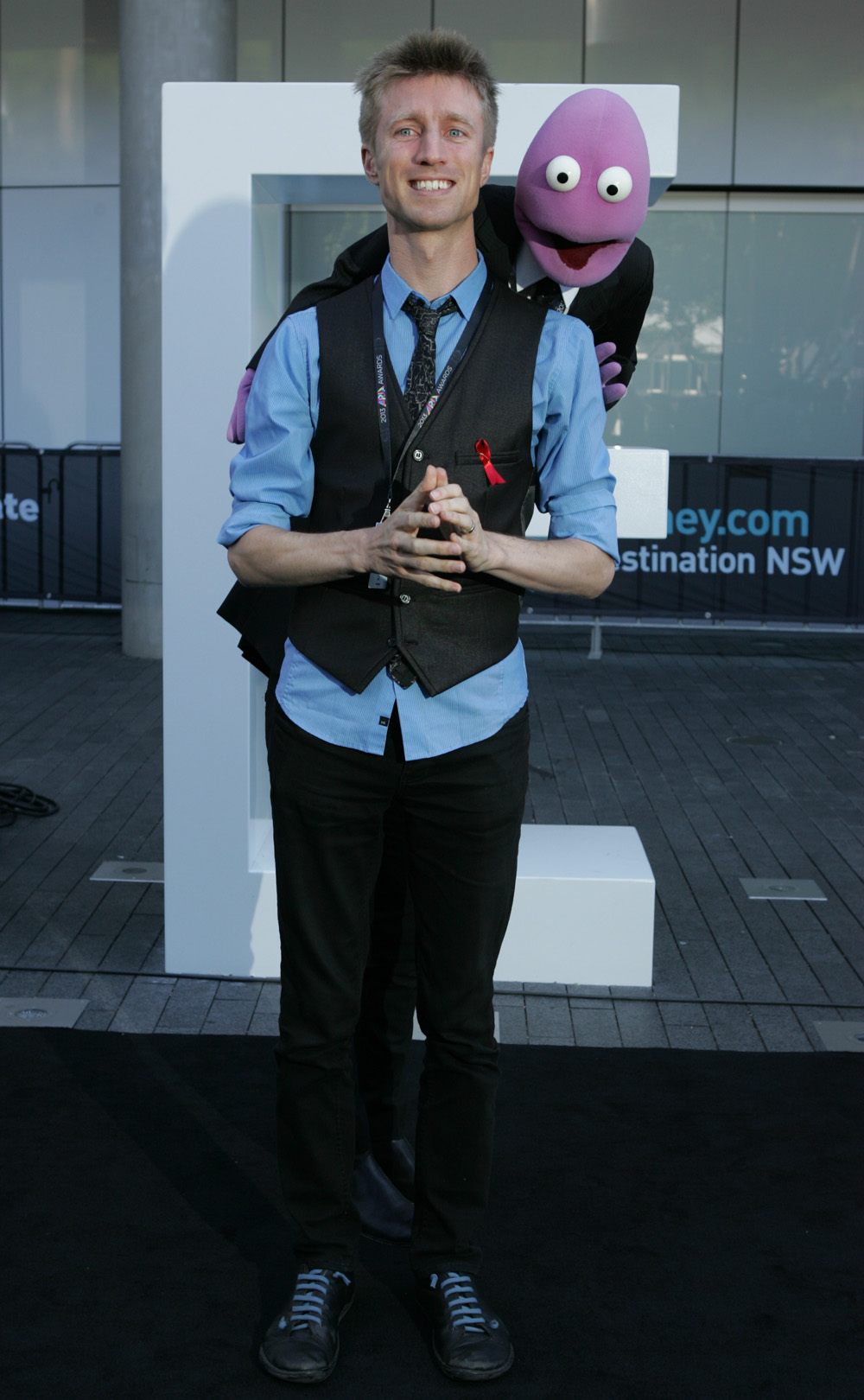
Sammy J (left) with comedic partner Randy at the 2013 Aria Awards in Sydney, Australia.

In 2008, McMillan collaborated with puppeteer Heath McIvor on a musical, Sammy J in the Forest of Dreams. The show, which starred McMillan and 14 foul-mouthed puppets operated by McIvor, was an adult fairy tale parodying the format of Disney children's movies. Forest of Dreams was well received by critics in Melbourne, earning a nomination for the festival's Barry Award for the most outstanding show and winning The Age Critics Award for the best local act. Following a successful Edinburgh season, the show toured the UK and played at the Leicester Square Theatre in London.

In 2010 he began working with Randy Feltface to create Ricketts Lane, which won the Barry Award for Most Outstanding Show at the Melbourne International Comedy Festival. It then played at the Sydney Opera House. The two debuted the sequel, Bin Night, in 2011 at the Melbourne International Comedy Festival where they performed the song "Secrets", and later that year became regular cast members on the sketch comedy show Good News World, earning a national television following through their weekly songs and sketches.

In 2012 the duo debuted The Inheritance, which played in most Australian capital cities and received five star reviews in Edinburgh. The same year, Sammy J and Randy hosted the Melbourne International Comedy Festival Gala, creating an original opening musical sequence in which they set about kidnapping the "real" host, Adam Hills. In November that year, they were commissioned by radio station Triple J to create a musical tribute to Australian music. The duo also appeared on the final episode of ABC's Q&A singing a song about the year in politics, and finished the year performing at the Falls Festival in Marion Bay, Tasmania.

In December 2013, McMillan and Randy debuted Sammy J & Randy's Difficult First Album which is a live recording of one of their Brisbane performances of Sammy J & Randy: The Arena Spectacular.

In September 2015, Sammy J & Randy in Ricketts Lane, a sitcom based on their touring show of the same name, was released on ABC iview. It was broadcast on ABC TV in October that year, before airing on Seeso in the US and Netflix in the UK & Ireland.

=== The 50 Year Show ===
At the 2008 Melbourne Fringe Festival the then 25-year-old McMillan launched The 50 Year Show, the first in a series of live comedy shows which he plans to reprise every five years, ending in 2058 when he will be 75. McMillan describes the show as "a living, breathing comedic time capsule. Every five years we can observe the world, make predictions, see how the world's changed." It includes segments such as a 50 Year Soap Opera, a 50 Year Story; and the 50 Year Dancers, a group of five-year-olds performing a routine which they will repeat at each show. McMillan first conceived the idea for The 50 Year Show in 2007 while sitting on a London bus full of elderly people and wondering how he could make his mark.

The second instalment took place on 3 October 2013, continuing each segment with the original cast performing alongside their younger selves on a giant projection screen, and the third show took place on 27 September 2018 at the Northcote Town Hall. The fourth show took place at the Melbourne Town Hall on 6 October 2023.

== Discography ==
=== Albums ===
List of albums
Title	Album details
The Burden of Popularity	Released: 2005; Label: Sammy J; Formats: CD, certain tracks available for download
Sammy J – Live?	Released: 2006; Label: Sammy J; Formats: CD
Sticky Digits	Released: 2009; Label: Sammy J (SJ-001); Formats: CD, download
Skinny Man, Modern World	Released: May 2012; Label: Words And Music Entertainment; Formats: download
Sammy J & Randy's Difficult First Album	Released: December 2013; Label: Ribcage/Feltface Records; Formats: download
Symphony in J Minor	Released: May 2019; Label: Words And Music Entertainment; Formats: download

=== Video releases ===
List of video
Title	Album details
Sammy J in The Forest of Dreams	Released: 2010; Formats: DVD
58 Kilograms of Pure Entertainment	Released: 2011; Formats: DVD
Bin Night (with Randy)	Released: 2012; Formats: DVD
Sammy J and Randy Live	Released: 2014; Formats: DVD

== Awards and nominations ==
=== ARIA Music Awards ===
The ARIA Music Awards are a set of annual ceremonies presented by Australian Recording Industry Association (ARIA), which recognise excellence, innovation, and achievement across all genres of the music of Australia. They commenced in 1987.

Year	Nominee / work	Award	Result	Ref.
2012	Skinny Man, Modern World	Best Comedy Release	Nominated	
2013	Bin Night (with Randy)	Best Comedy Release	Nominated	
2015	Live (with Randy)	Best Comedy Release	Nominated	
2019	Symphony in J Minor	Best Comedy Release	Nominated	

=== Melbourne International Comedy Festival ===
- 2006 - Best Newcomer Award Winner
- 2008 - The Age Critics' Award Winner (with Randy)
- 2010 - Barry Award for Most Outstanding Show (with Randy)
