= Penelope Swales =

- Occupations: Singer-songwriter, musician
- Instrument: Guitar
- Years active: 1993–present
- Website: penelopeswales.com

Penelope Swales is an Australian songwriter, folk singer, instrument maker, legal aid lawyer, and activist based in the Dandenong Ranges. Swales performed at the Poly Pride Day in New York's Central Park in 2007, and toured Europe in 2008 with the band Totally Gourdgeous. She spent much of her early life homeless. Working with musical instrument maker Jack Spira, she began making instruments using the hard shells of gourds similar to kalimbas, and has made and sold many of them. She became a legal aid lawyer.

== Discography ==
- Between Light And Dark, 1993
- Returning on Foot, 1995
- Homemade Wine, 1997
- Live At Woodford, 1998
- Justifying Your Longings to the Doctor, 1998
- Archive: Demos, out-takes and one-offs 1995–2000, 2001
- Monkey Comfort, 2003
- Archive Vol 2: Songs from the Borderline, 2005
- Skin: Deep – Polymorphous Love Songs, 2007
- Legacy: Two Decades of Topical Songwriting, 2010

== Television appearances ==
Swales appeared on the RMITV show Under Melbourne Tonight in 1996.
