= Nathan Lovejoy =

Australian actor (born 1981)

- Born: 2 December 1981 (age 44); Launceston, Tasmania, Australia
- Occupation: Actor
- Years active: 2005–present

Nathan Lovejoy (born 2 December 1981) is an Australian actor, known for his roles as Principal Swift on the Disney Channel sci-fi teen sitcom Gabby Duran & the Unsittables, for which he was nominated for a Daytime Creative Arts Emmy Award for Outstanding Principal Performance in a Children's Program; and as Borkman in the Australian comedy series Sammy J & Randy in Ricketts Lane, for which he was nominated for an AACTA Award for Best Performance in a Television Comedy.

He also appeared as Felix Rolleston in the TV movie The Mystery of a Hansom Cab and Will Sharp in season 2 of the ABC political thriller The Code.

== Life and career ==
Lovejoy was born in Launceston, Tasmania. He attended Vermont Secondary College and is a graduate of the National Institute of Dramatic Art (NIDA).

== Filmography ==
Television
Year	Title	Role	Notes
2023	The Residence	Alden Tamridge	5 episodes
2023	The Girls on the Bus	Tate Winston Wade	1 episode
2019	Gabby Duran & the Unsittables	Principal Swift	17 episodes
2018	The Good Place	Gel Mibson	1 episode
2018	True Story with Hamish & Andy	Scott	1 episode
2017	Becoming Bond	Chook Warner	Telemovie
2016	Deep Water	Maestri	1 episode
2016	Bombshell	Martini Gotje	Telemovie
2016	Here Come the Habibs!	Bobby Peeker	1 episode
2016	The Code	Will Sharp	6 episodes
2015	Sammy J & Randy in Ricketts Lane	Borkman	6 episodes
2015	The Kettering Incident	Tim Edwards	2 episodes
2014	This is Littleton	Various	4 episodes
2012	The Mystery of a Hansom Cab	Felix Rolleston	Telemovie
2011	At Home With Julia	Jewellery Store Owner	1 episode
2011	My Place	Chaplain	1 episode
2011	Laid	Guy	1 episode
2010	Review with Myles Barlow	Don	1 episode
2010	The Pacific	Sergeant Crease	1 episode
2005/6	headLand	Pete Coleman	5 episodes

== Theatre ==
Theatre
Year	Title	Role	Notes
2017	The Rover	Frederick/Don Antonio	Belvoir
2015	Romeo & Juliet	Benvolio	Bell Shakespeare/Sydney Symphony Orchestra
2014	The Good Person of Szechwan	Husband/Mi Tsu	Malthouse Theatre
2014	Clybourne Park	Karl/Steve	Ensemble Theatre
2014	Hamlet	Rosencrantz/Guildenstern	Belvoir
2014	Empire: Terror on the High Seas	Dick Cavendish	Tamarama Rock Surfers
2013	Henry IV	Warwick/Snare	Bell Shakespeare
2011	This Year's Ashes	Brian/Adam/Tom	Griffin Theatre Company
2011	Much Ado About Nothing	Borachio	Bell Shakespeare
2010	Way to Heaven	Commandant	Ride On Theatre/Griffin Theatre Company
2009	The Crucible	Reverend Hale	Sydney Theatre Company
2009	Midsummer Nights Dream	Demetrius/Starveling/Moon	Bell Shakespeare/Sydney Symphony Orchestra
2008	Anatomy Titus: Fall of Rome	Bassianus/Saturninus	Bell Shakespeare/Queensland Theatre Company
2008	Twelfth Night	Malvolio/Antonio	Siren Theatre Company
2007	The Merchant of Venice	Antonio/Shylock	Ride On/Belvoir
2006	The Tempest	Caliban	Bell Shakespeare
2005	King Lear	Edmund/Kent	Harlos Productions
2005	Bones	Benny	Darlinghurst Theatre Company

== Awards ==
- Nominated – AACTA Award for Best Performance in a Television Comedy, Sammy J & Randy in Ricketts Lane (2015)
- Nominated – Daytime Creative Arts Emmy Award for Outstanding Principal Performance in a Children's Program, Gabby Duran & the Unsittables (2021)
