= Totally Gourdgeous =

- Origin: Melbourne, Victoria, Australia
- Genres: Folk; country
- Years active: 1998–present
- Labels: Independent; MGM
- Members: Andrew Clermont; Carl Pannuzzo; Penelope Swales; Mal Webb
- Website: Official website

Totally Gourdgeous are an Australian folk band, in which the members' instruments are manufactured from gourds made by the group's Penelope Swales. They formed in Melbourne in 1998, with Swales on guitar, stomp box, hulusi, aslatuas, mandolin, vocals; Andrew Clermont on fiddle, guitar, mandolin and vocals; Carl Pannuzzo on drums, guitar and vocals; and Mal Webb on fretless bass guitar, mbira, gourd trumpet and vocals. The group made their live debut at the 1999-2000 Woodford Folk Festival, and have become popular mainstays of folk and country festivals around Australia. The group have released five albums, the two most recent of which being distributed by MGM. During performances and recording the members alternate lead and backing vocals, typically depending on who wrote each song. Their music style ranges from folk-rock and country to soul and funk, and their lyrics, whilst typically comedic or tongue-in-cheek in nature, frequently cover topics including peace, conservation, philosophy, love, and activism.

== Members ==
- Andrew Clermont – fiddle, guitar, mandolin, vocals
- Carl Pannuzzo – percussion, drums, guitar, vocals
- Penelope Swales – guitar, stomp box, hulusi, aslatuas, mandolin, vocals
- Mal Webb – bass guitar, mbira, gourd trumpet, vocals

The members take turns as lead vocalist and backing vocalists.

== Discography ==
- Totally Gourdgeous (2000) – Independent (GRD1)
- D'vine (2002) – Independent (GRD2)
- The Stroke of Midnight (2005) – Independent (GRD3)
- Pun Kin (2011) – Independent/MGM Distribution (GRD4)
- Gourd in the Act (2020) – Independent/MGM Distribution (GRD5)
- Plus 3 DVDs

The Bazaar Clips (2007) – Independent - Live @ Woodford Folk Fest

Shades of the Vine (2014) Independent - Live @ Enrec Studio

The Ripe Stuff - Independent - Live @ West End, Brisbane
