= Steph Tisdell =

Aboriginal Australian comedian and writer

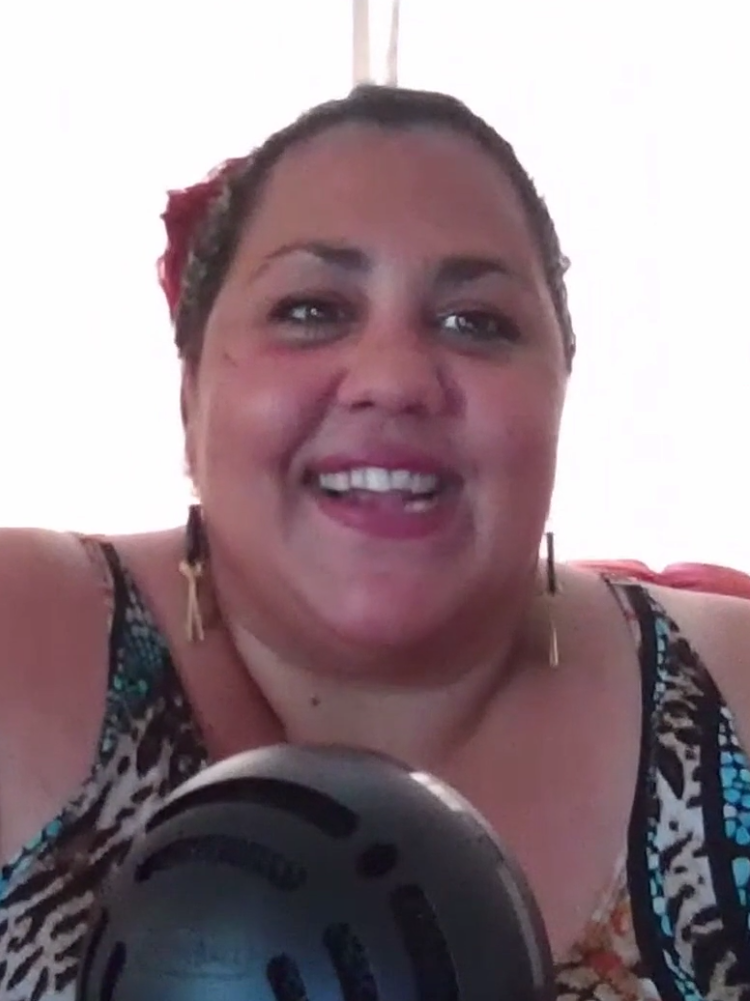
- Tisdell in 2021
- Born: Stephanie Tisdell; 1992 or 1993 (age 33–34); Mount Isa, Queensland, Australia
- Education: University of Queensland
- Occupations: Comedian; writer; actor; presenter
- Known for: Total Control, Class of '07, Bump

Comedy career
- Years active: 2014–present
- Website: stephtisdell.com

Steph Tisdell is an Aboriginal Australian comedian, actor, writer, author and presenter.

Tisdell, a Yidinji woman, was born in Mount Isa and grew up in Brisbane, Queensland. After studying human rights law and journalism at university, Tisdell began a stand-up comedy career in 2014, winning the Deadly Funny Award at the Melbourne International Comedy Festival in the same year. She went on to win the Pinder Prize for her show The Pyramid in 2019, and hosted the Melbourne International Comedy Festival Gala in 2022. As a presenter, she also co-hosted the NAIDOC Awards in 2024.

In 2021, Tisdell became an actor, appearing alongside Deborah Mailman and Rachel Griffiths in Total Control, an ABC political drama series. She has also appeared in the Prime Video apocalypse comedy series Class of '07, the Stan comedy drama series Bump, and the Netflix rom-com film Love Is in the Air. Tisdell became a published author in 2024, releasing a young adult novel titled The Skin I'm In, and was a contestant on The Amazing Race Australia 9 in 2025.

== Early life ==
Tisdell was born in the early 1990s in Mount Isa, an outback town in Northwest Queensland. Her mother Wendy, a Yidinji woman, and father Mark, a white Australian, had started a business together in Mount Isa in the 1980s. Wendy Tisdell went on to found Bridgit Water, a non-profit organisation supporting drinking water access in rural communities, where Mark Tisdell also works as a technical director.

Tisdell grew up in Brisbane as the youngest sibling to three older brothers. While at school, her dream jobs included working for a current affairs program like Foreign Correspondent or Hungry Beast, and being a social justice advocate for Aboriginal people, citing Tania Major as an inspiration.

At the University of Queensland, Tisdell commenced a dual degree in law and journalism, but halfway through the degree she experienced disillusionment, had a breakdown, and dropped out. Tisdell then spent four months backpacking in the United Kingdom and Ireland.

== Career ==
=== 2014–2018: Early stand-up and Deadly Funny ===
Tisdell first performed stand-up at a pub in Dublin, Ireland, after a group of Australians she met while travelling dared her to. Her improvised set lasted for ten minutes. After returning to Australia, Tisdell only performed comedy once or twice more before entering into the Deadly Funny Competition (a Melbourne International Comedy Festival initiative for Aboriginal and Torres Strait Islander comedians) in 2014, which she won.

Following the Deadly Funny win, Tisdell relocated to Edinburgh, Scotland, where she lived for two years and developed her stand-up comedy skills. In 2016, she experienced a "massive breakdown" and stopped working in comedy for a year.

In 2018, Tisdell debuted her first solo show Identity Steft, which earned her a nomination for Best Newcomer at the Melbourne International Comedy Festival, and won the Best Emerging Talent award at the Adelaide Fringe. She became a mentor and MC for Deadly Funny, and made appearances on Tonightly with Tom Ballard and The Project. She also toured with the Aboriginal Comedy All Stars group, including performances at the Edinburgh Fringe Festival and Soho Theatre in London.

=== 2019: The Pyramid ===
Tisdell's 2019 show The Pyramid was a co-recipient, along with Sam Taunton's show, of the Pinder Prize at that year's Melbourne International Comedy Festival. Tisdell performed at the 2019 Melbourne International Comedy Festival Gala; a clip from this performance, about portmanteau names for Aboriginal children with red hair, went viral on social media. Tisdell's Gala set attracted the attention of Rachel Griffiths, who began corresponding with Tisdell and encouraged her to pursue acting roles. Unbeknownst to Tisdell, Griffiths recommended her to be cast in the second series of Total Control, a political drama centred on an Aboriginal politician starring Deborah Mailman and Griffiths.

=== 2020–2023: Acting and hosting roles ===
In 2020, Tisdell was announced as the voice of Daringa the goat in animated comedy Cooked, co-starring English comedian Ross Noble as the voice of James Cook's ghost. She also appeared on the panel show Hughesy, We Have a Problem, and co-hosted a NAIDOC Week concert alongside Aaron Fa'aoso.

Tisdell's debut acting role in series 2 of Total Control, which aired in 2021, led to her being cast in the Amazon Prime series Class of '07, an Australian survival comedy set during a high school reunion. The show was filmed in Sydney during COVID-19 lockdowns. Also in 2021, Tisdell and political journalist Annabel Crabb co-hosted the podcast Ms Represented, which covered the history of women in Australian politics.

Having initially been invited to host in 2020, before the festival was cancelled, Tisdell served as the host of the Melbourne International Comedy Festival Gala upon its return in 2022. Tisdell's 2022 show, Baby Beryl, would be her last until 2026.

Class of '07 premiered in 2023, as did Love Is in the Air, a Netflix rom-com film starring Delta Goodrem in which Tisdell played a supporting role. Towards the end of 2023, Tisdell and Dylan Alcott joined the cast of series 4 of Bump, a comedy drama co-created by and starring Claudia Karvan. Tisdell drew inspiration for her character, a "progressive but socially inept" Teal independent mayor, from Mahatma Gandhi and Bob Katter.

=== 2024–2025: The Skin I'm In and TV appearances ===
Australian publishing group Pan MacMillan approached Tisdell to write a novel for a teenage audience. The book, titled The Skin I'm In, was published in 2024. Tisdell described it as "a fictional YA novel that speaks to the nuances of being Blak in this country". Along with actor Rob Collins, Tisdell co-hosted the 2024 NAIDOC Awards, which were held in Adelaide. In the same year, she appeared in the Rebel Wilson musical film The Deb, and moderated a feminist roast at Sydney's "All About Women" festival, a role she reprised in future years.

In 2025, Tisdell and her brother Ben, an emergency room doctor, competed together on a celebrity series of travel competition show The Amazing Race Australia. The Tisdells were the third team to be eliminated, having reached Samarkand, Uzbekistan. Tisdell also reunited with her Bump co-star Claudia Karvan for the SBS road trip documentary series Great Australian Road Trips, and appeared on music panel show Spicks and Specks. Furthermore, Tisdell was in the writers' room for the Australian adaptation of the BBC sitcom Ghosts. She had previously worked as a writer on other Australian comedy series, including Fisk, Rosehaven, and Bump.

=== 2026: Return to stand-up ===
2026 saw Tisdell return to stand-up comedy with a new solo show titled Fat.

== Personal life ==
Tisdell began a relationship with Jessie, a Brisbane bookstore employee, in 2024. As of 2024, Tisdell also had two pet Amazon parrots, who are named after Michael Parkinson and Eddie McGuire.

Tisdell has been open about her struggles with anxiety and her mental health. She also previously developed pica.

Tisdell formerly played the drums, and can speak conversational Swahili.
