= The Adventures of Lano and Woodley =

- Genre: Comedy
- Created by: Colin Lane; Frank Woodley
- Starring: Colin Lane; Frank Woodley
- Country of origin: Australia
- No. of seasons: 2
- No. of episodes: 13

Production
- Running time: 30 minutes
- Production companies: ABC TV Comedy Victoria; Working Title Films

Original release
- Network: ABC
- Release: 1 September 1997 – 26 June 1999

The Adventures of Lano and Woodley is an Australian comedy television show starring the comedic duo of Lano and Woodley (Colin Lane and Frank Woodley), consisting of two series which aired on ABC TV from 1997 to 1999. The first series was distributed on VHS and in 2004 The Complete Adventures of Lano and Woodley was released as a two-disc DVD rather than each series being released separately.

According to Tony Martin, Seasons 3 and 4 of the show were written, but never were produced due to the head of comedy at the ABC at the time saying the show was not topical enough. Martin said that Lane and Woodley wrote six episodes for a third season, and comedy writers such as himself, Matthew Quartermaine and Matt Cameron wrote seven episodes for a fourth season.

== Episodes ==
=== Season 1 (1997) ===
The Adventures of Lano and Woodley first screened on the ABC on 1 September 1997, and in the UK it was shown on BBC2 in September 1999. The series was produced by Working Title/Polygram UK, with Marc Gracie as the Australian Producer. The episodes "Starquest" and "The Girlfriend" were directed by Bob Spiers (who also directed Fawlty Towers and Absolutely Fabulous), with Jon Olb and Mandy Smith directing 7 and 4 other episodes each, respectively. The series' music was by Mal Webb (except for "Starquest", to which Yuri Worontschak contributed).

No. overall	No. in series	Title	Directed by	Written by	Original release date	Prod. code
1	1	"The Girlfriend"	Bob Spiers	Colin Lane, Frank Woodley, and Neill Gladwin	1 September 1997	TBA
Frank admits to Col that he is a virgin, and Col sees this as a chance to show up Frank, so he invents himself an imaginary girlfriend named Jenny. What starts off as a trick becomes a bit more serious when Frank starts feeling left out and decides to move out.
2	2	"One Simple Task"	Mandy Smith	Colin Lane and Frank Woodley	8 September 1997	TBA
After the duo get fired again, Col tells Frank that he cannot be Frank's friend. Frank plans a holiday for the two of them to strengthen their friendship. When it is time to leave, Frank realises he has forgotten to book the caravan, and exacerbates matters by lying about the situation.
3	3	"Starquest"	Bob Spiers	Colin Lane and Frank Woodley	15 September 1997	TBA
Col and Frank decide they are good enough to appear on a local talent show, 'Starquest' (a parody of Young Talent Time). After working long and hard on a musical/dance routine, Col feels they are far better than any of the other contestants and deserve to be treated as celebrities. On the big night, things do not go exactly as planned, and the show ends up being cancelled when it's revealed that the show was rigged.
4	4	"Tonight You Die"	Mandy Smith	Colin Lane and Frank Woodley	22 September 1997	TBA
On Friday the 13th Col finds out that Frank is very superstitious. To help end his fears Col takes Frank to the local video shop to hire a scary video. After being spooked by the movie, Frank and Col start to experience numerous threats to their well-being.
5	5	"The Wall"	Mandy Smith	Colin Lane and Frank Woodley	29 September 1997	TBA
Col and Frank find out that either them or their next-door neighbour Mitchell will be evicted if their apartment does not pass inspection by their landlord. With the knowledge they are up against a perfectionist, their attempts to improve their apartment result in irreversible damage and a major cover-up attempt by the pair.
6	6	"The Two Men"	Mandy Smith	Colin Lane and Frank Woodley	6 October 1997	TBA
Frank and Col decide to go looking for love in a local pub, and they find themselves coming home with two girls. The next morning when the girls have left they find a police officer knocking on their door and accusing them of robbery. Frank and Col then become fugitives while searching for who really committed the robbery.

=== Season 2 (1999) ===
First screened on The Comedy Network in Canada in March 1999 and then screened on the ABC TV on 15 May 1999. The series' music was by Mal Webb.

Story	Episode	Title	Directed by	Written by	Original release date	Prod. code
7	1	"Primal Warrior"	Jon Olb	Colin Lane and Frank Woodley	15 May 1999	TBA
Col thinks that if something happens to him Frank will never be able to look after himself, so Col decides to help Frank become a man, like him. To achieve this, he makes Frank do a bunch of dangerous activities over a weekend-long 'survival camp' in their apartment (reminiscent of the Mythopoetic men's movement).
8	2	"The Pool"	Jon Olb	Colin Lane and Frank Woodley	22 May 1999	TBA
After finding out Frank cannot swim, Col takes him to the big outdoor swimming pool for a beginners swim class. Frank develops a crush on the swimming instructor after she performs CPR on him. Frank spends the episode trying to get her attention and admit his undying love for her, while Col steals the costume for his favourite TV character, Penguin Man.
9	3	"The Easter Story"	Jon Olb	Colin Lane and Frank Woodley	29 May 1999	TBA
Col accidentally makes fun of his new neighbour's speech impediment, and in return she threatens that she will make Col sorry. While collecting items from around the apartment to donate to the local church's op shop, Frank accidentally puts Col's favourite pair of socks in the donation box. Col is convinced that their neighbour is stealing his washing out of retribution, and stages a showdown at the church's Easter Mass.
10	4	"Game Show God"	Jon Olb	Colin Lane and Frank Woodley	5 June 1999	TBA
Col learns that Frank has a fear of beards. This creates an argument between Col and Frank over who is more intelligent. They test this by competing over answers on their favourite show 'Mindbender' (a parody of Sale of the Century), but Col cheats in order to win. Not knowing this, Frank enters Col as a contestant on the show. Col ends up winning on the show against the carry over champion without answering a single question.
11	5	"Mother"	Jon Olb	Colin Lane and Frank Woodley	12 June 1999	TBA
When Col's mother dies, a corrupt politician named Vera Watkins makes a secret deal to pretend that Col was adopted and that he is her long lost son, so that she can win back votes. Col believes that Watkins is his real mother and Col gets himself into more than he bargains for.
12	6	"I Love You Baby (Part 1)"	Jon Olb	Colin Lane and Frank Woodley	19 June 1999	TBA
Col and Frank pretend to be baby photographers after hospitalising their boss so they can earn much money. When they accidentally switch two babies around after a photoshoot in the maternity ward, Frank and Col end up inadvertently stealing a baby and become fugitives from the law.
13	7	"I Love You Baby (Part 2)"	Jon Olb	Colin Lane and Frank Woodley	26 June 1999	TBA
Col and Frank pretend to be baby photographers after hospitalising their boss so they can earn much money. When they accidentally switch two babies around after a photoshoot in the maternity ward, Frank and Col end up inadvertently stealing a baby and become fugitives from the law.
