= Daniel Connell =

Australian artist (b. 1970)

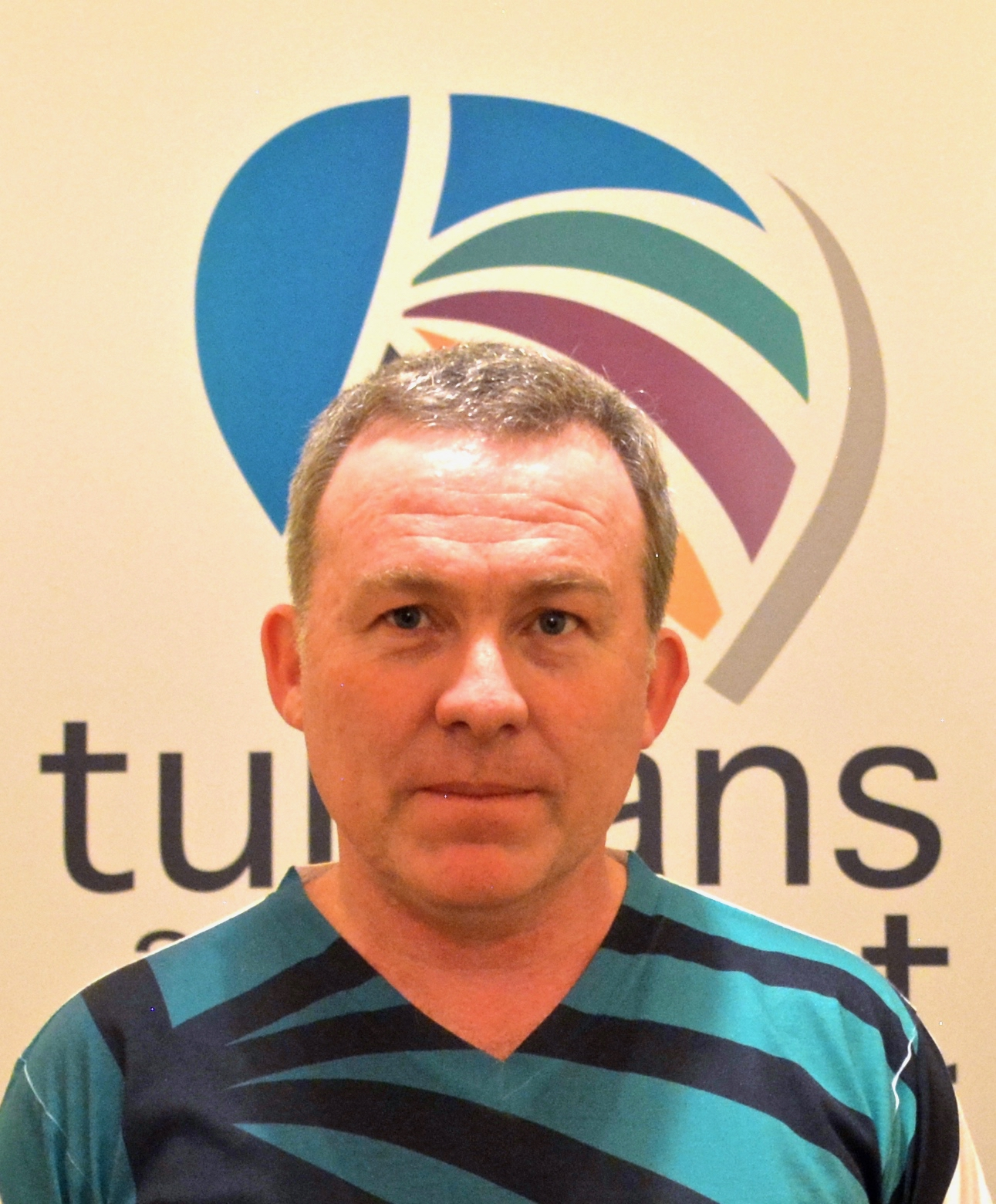
- Born: Daniel Connell; 1970 (age 55–56); Adelaide, South Australia
- Education: Flinders University, University of South Australia
- Known for: Drawing
- Awards: Finalist, 2008 Doug Moran Portrait Prize
- Website: www.danielconnell.org

Daniel Connell (born 1970) is an Australian artist and arts educator. He is known for portraiture and was selected for the Australia Council's Arts Leadership Program in 2020.

== Early life ==
Connell was born in South Australia. He has a Bachelor of Spanish and Latin American studies and a Diploma of Education from Flinders University, a Master of Visual Art and a PhD from the University of South Australia. He lived in India for two years and travels and exhibits there. He participated in the Kochi-Muziris Biennale and one of his works was vandalised during the first Biennale. Connell exhibited his portraits of Sikhs in London.

Connell lectures at Adelaide Central School of Art.

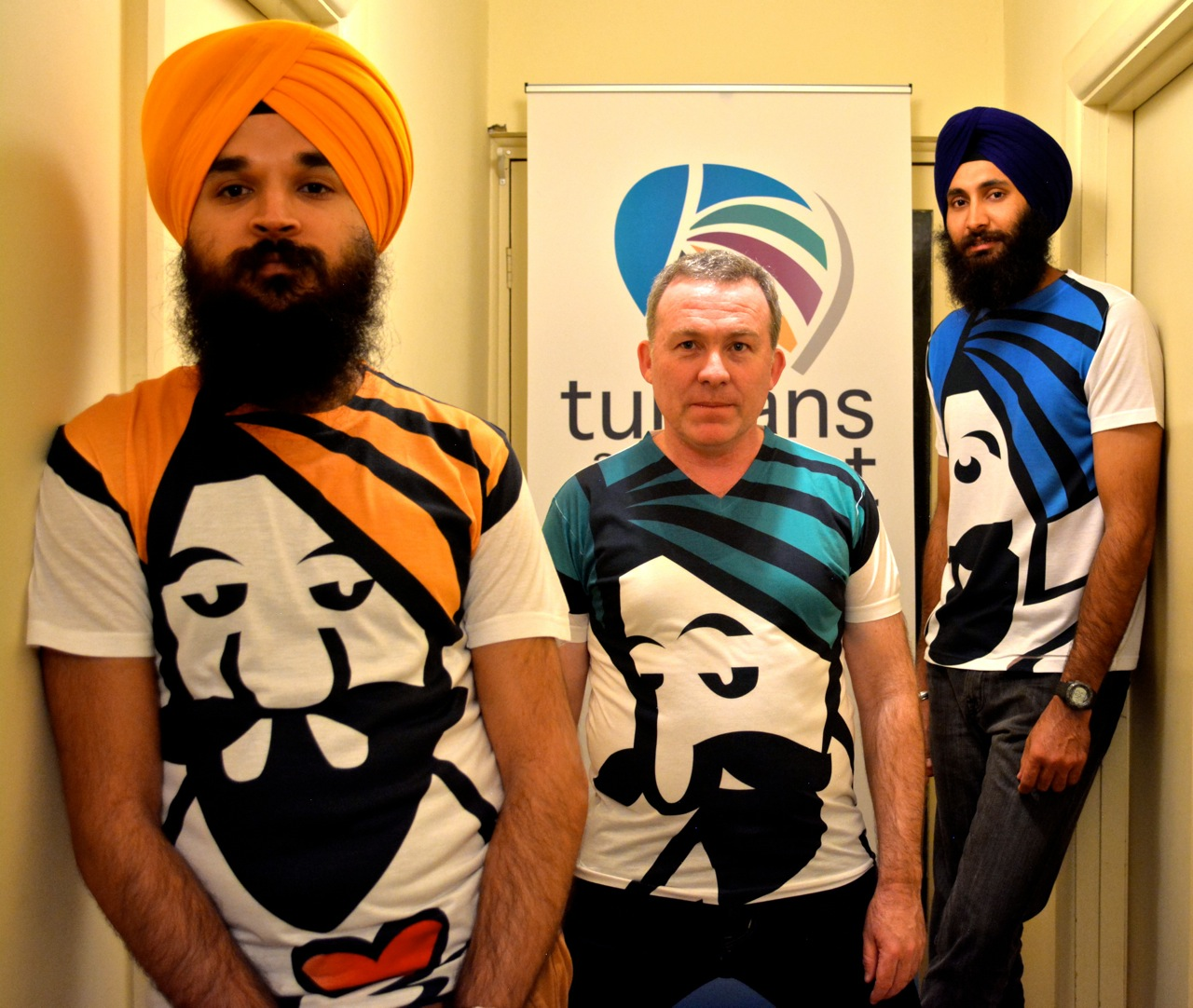
Harjit Singh, Daniel Connell, Jasdeep Singh 2013.

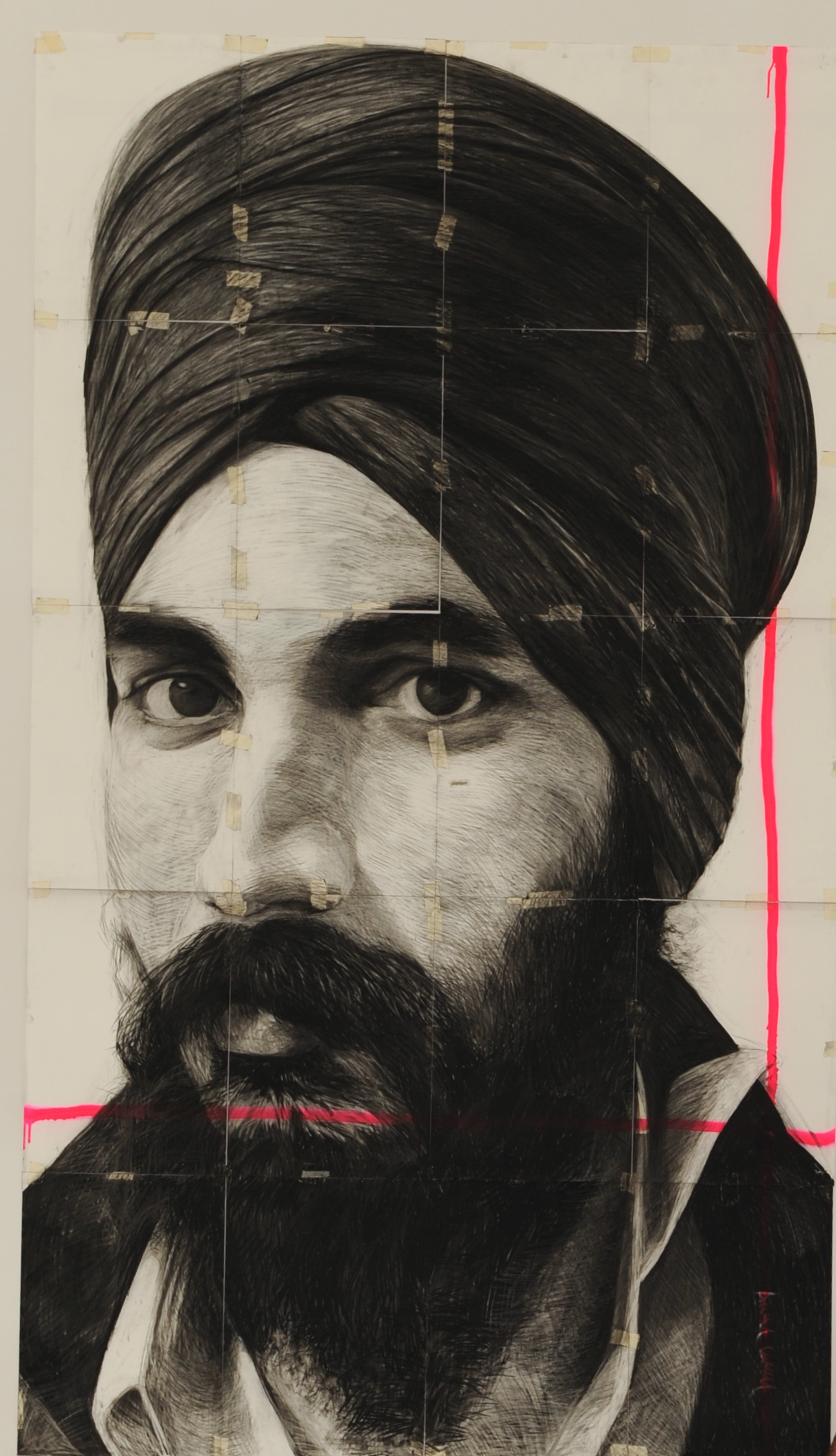
Portrait of J Singh by Daniel Connell 2010, charcoal and aerosol on paper, 280x175cm

== Artistic style and subject ==
Connell is known for his large-scale, drawn portraits of migrants, particularly of the Indian community in South Australia. He created portraits of fishermen and cancer patients in India.

== Awards and prizes ==
- Finalist, Doug Moran Portrait Prize (2008)
- Finalist, 7th Prospect Portrait Prize (2011)
- Finalist, 9th Prospect Portrait Prize (2107)

== Major exhibitions ==
- Kochi-Muziris Biennale (2012)
- Kochi-Muziris Biennale (2014)
- Kochi-Muziris Biennale (2016)
