= Randy Feltface =

Australian puppet comedian

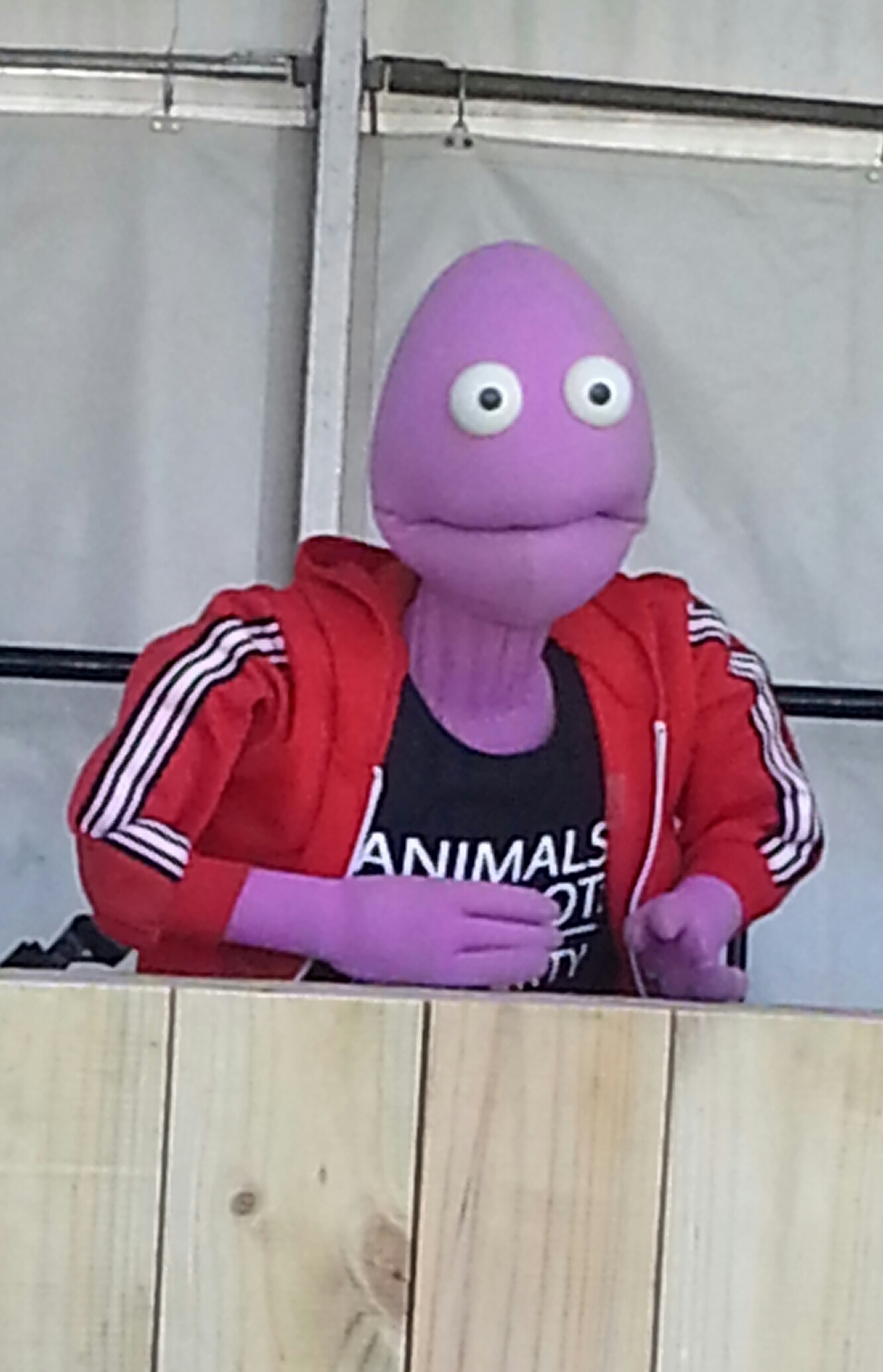
- Randy Feltface at the 2015 Vegan Festival in Adelaide
- Created by: Heath McIvor; Philip Millar
- Portrayed by: Heath McIvor
- Voiced by: Heath McIvor
- Born: 17 August 1980 (age 46)
- Nationality: Australian
- Medium: Stand-up, television
- Years active: 2005–present
- Genres: Observational comedy, Comedy music
- Website: feltface.com

Randy Feltface, mostly referred to merely as Randy or, on occasion, Randy the Purple Puppet, is an Australian puppet comedian portrayed by Heath McIvor. Randy is a fixture on the international stand-up circuit and makes regular guest appearances on Australian television. He also performs as one half of the musical comedy duo "Sammy J and Randy", who made their television sitcom debut in 2015 with Sammy J & Randy in Ricketts Lane on ABC in Australia, for which Randy is credited as co-writer and lead actor. In 2019, Randy competed in the American reality television comedy competition series Bring the Funny, making it to the second round (the "Comedy Clash").

== Fictography ==
Randy notes that he has an unusually elaborate life story for a puppet comedian, though his operator, Heath McIvor, has stated that it has changed over time and that Randy sometimes makes new claims about his life in an improvisational manner.

=== Early stand-up career ===
Randy's first acting gig was in a presentation on workplace bullying. Having gained a taste for showbiz, he soon began to make occasional appearances on the stand-up circuit in around 2005. Randy and Sammy J first met when they shared a bill; shortly after they began performing together at the Butterfly Club in South Melbourne as Sammy J & Randy. Randy's first full-length solo show was Randy's Postcards from Purgatory, which debuted at the Melbourne International Comedy Festival in 2009 to critical acclaim.

== Personal life ==
In his first full-length show, Randy's Postcards from Purgatory, Randy revealed he was 38 years old, working children's parties on the weekend, going broke, and facing an impending divorce. He was also a heavy drinker and smoker. By the time of Randy is Sober it appears that Randy has quit drinking and smoking, and is now vegan. He has also written an unpublished novel entitled Walking to Skye, a recurring topic of interest in his 2015/2016 solo show Randy Writes a Novel.

During the events depicted in the second show, Ricketts Lane, Randy is sent to jail for tax fraud, thanks to his house-mate, Sammy J, a young lawyer desperate to make a case. However, McIvor noted that both Randy and Sammy J are actors on that show.

In his show Purple Privilege, Randy says he was born on the "day Lindy Chamberlain's baby was eaten by a dingo" (17 August 1980). He also stated to be pansexual.

== Creation ==
Randy Feltface is operated by Heath McIvor, who began his career in puppetry at age 13 in 1993, when he performed with the Melbourne children's theatre company Polyglot Theatre. He provided puppetry work for The Hobbit; The Lion, the Witch and the Wardrobe; and Walking With Dinosaurs, the Live Experience. He has also worked in television on Pig's Breakfast, Li'l Horrors and as "Fiend" in Me and My Monsters.

McIvor and his friend Philip Millar were working on a puppet musical called Tyrannosaurus Sex with a mutual friend Derek Rowe; Rowe, who worked as a workplace consultant for companies, was eventually contracted to create a show about workplace bullying by an insurance company. The show, entitled What's A Bully To You?, originally featured two puppets, but the team realised they needed a third, unisex puppet that could perform a male and a female role depending on the costume: the puppet, called "Beverly" and "Randy" depending on the role, was built by Millar, made from tools in his shed with his arm rods being hacked together from barbecue forks. The show was not received well by the company and McIvor decided to use the character and puppet for an upcoming puppet comedy show organised by Millar called Pure Puppet Palaver, rebranding it as a stand-up comedy act.

== Style ==
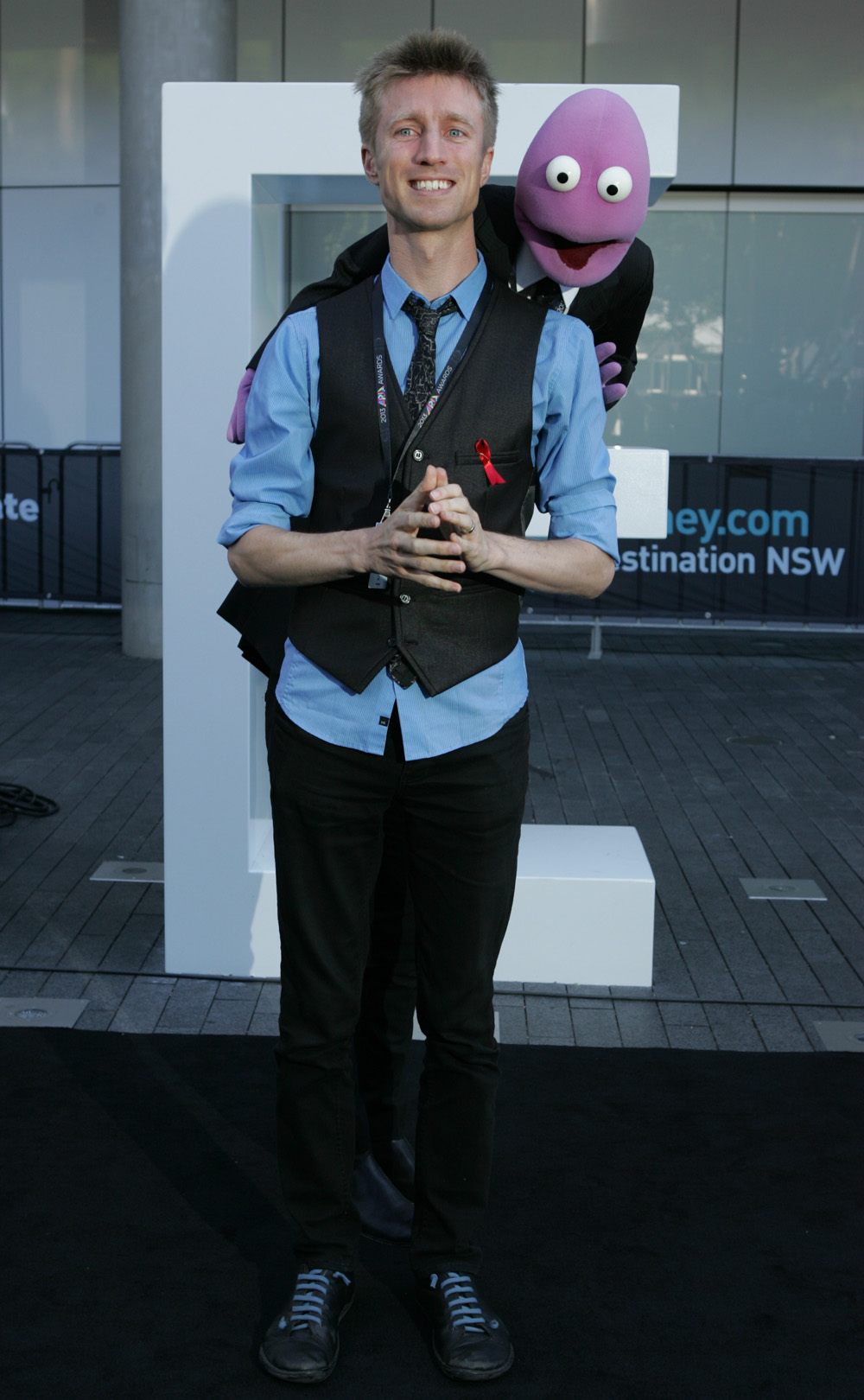
Randy (right) with comedic partner Sammy J

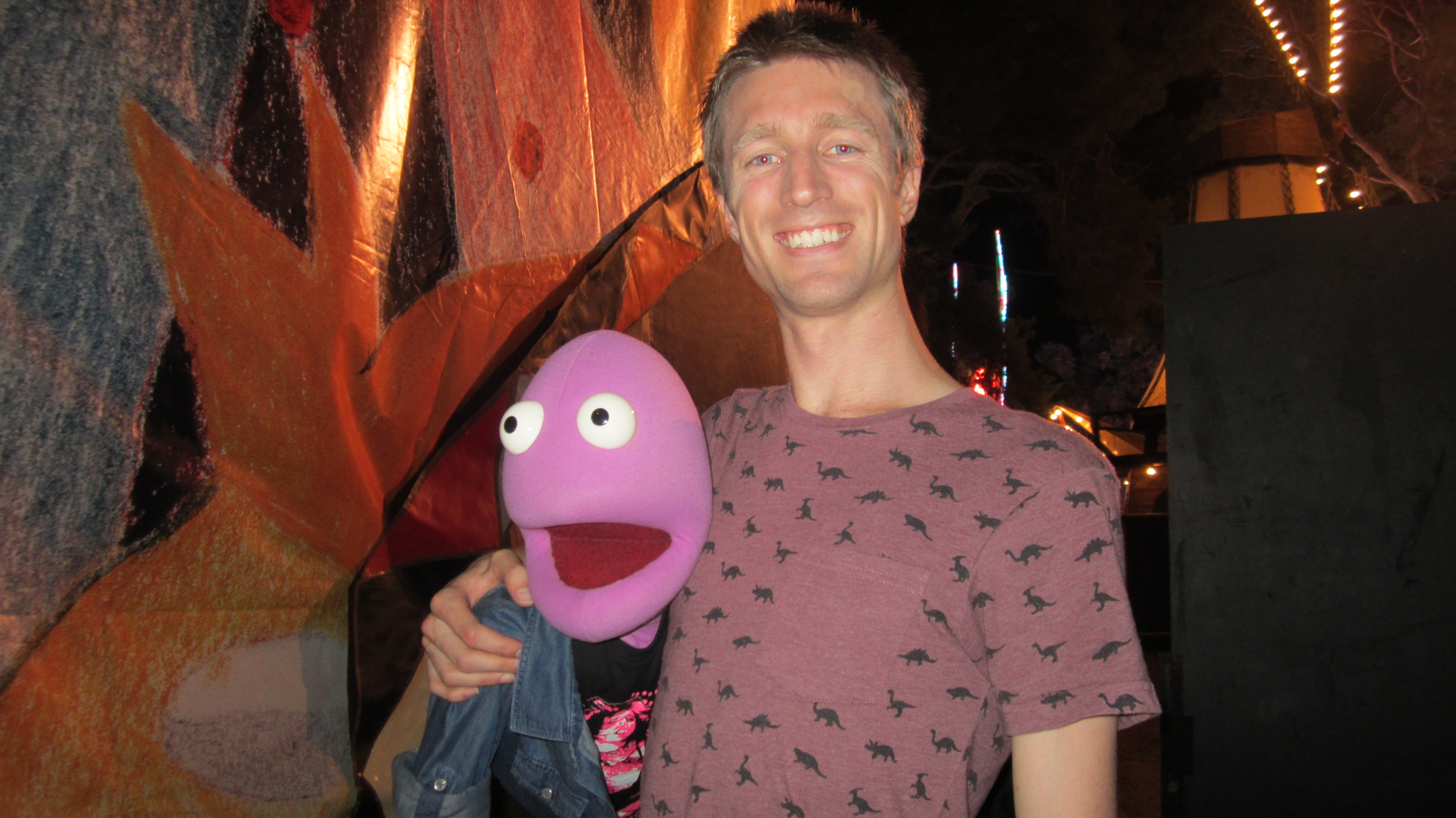
Randy (left) and Sammy J post-show in the Garden of Unearthly Delights at the 2016 Adelaide Fringe Festival

When performing with Sammy J, Randy performs the funny-man to Sammy J's straight-man in the double act with much of their material being musical comedy. In his solo performances, Randy tends towards observational comedy; in both Randy is Sober and Randy Writes a Novel, he contemplates his own progression as a person and his existential crisis as an artist. He often breaks the fourth wall, pointing out that he is a puppet and cannot actually see the audience, or noting that his movement on stage is usually limited to the desk he is behind.

== Works ==
=== Live shows ===
- 2009 Randy's Postcards From Purgatory
- 2010 Ricketts Lane (with Sammy J)
- 2011 Bin Night (with Sammy J)
- 2011–2013 Randy is Sober
- 2012 The Inheritance (with Sammy J)
- 2013 Sammy J & Randy: The Arena Spectacular
- 2013–2014 The Last Temptation of Randy
- 2015 An Evening with Sammy J & Randy
- 2015 Randy Writes a Novel
- 2016 Sammy J and Randy Land
- 2018 The Book of Randicus
- 2020 Modus Operandy
- 2021 Purple Privilege
- 2022 Inhale, Exile
- 2022 Alien of Extraordinary Ability
- 2023 Feltopia
- 2024 First Banana
- 2025 Gimmick

=== Television ===
- 2006 The Upper Hand – Short Film (Actor)
- 2011 The Project – Network 10 (Guest)
- 2011 Cracker Night – The Comedy Channel (Performer)
- 2011 Good News World – Network 10 (Cast Member)
- 2012 Warehouse Comedy – ABC TV (Performer – Sober)
- 2013 Live on Bowen – Channel 31 (Guest)
- 2013 No Laughing Matter – The Comedy Channel (Performer)
- 2014 Community Kitchen – Channel 31 (Guest)
- 2014 Spicks and Specks – ABC TV (Guest Contestant)
- 2015 Comedy Up Late – ABC TV (Performer)
- 2015 Sammy J & Randy in Ricketts Lane – ABC TV (Writer, Actor)
- 2015 The Chaser's Media Circus – ABC TV (Guest Contestant)
- 2016 The Yearly with Charlie Pickering – ABC TV ("ABC Business Correspondent")
- 2019 Bring the Funny – NBC (Contestant)
- 2020 Aunty Donna's Big Ol' House of Fun – Netflix (Guest)
- 2023 De Avondshow met Arjen Lubach – NPO (Guest)
- 2026 LUBACH - RTL 4

=== Recordings ===
- 2012 Randy is Sober (DVD)
- 2012 Sammy J and Randy in Bin Night (DVD)
- 2013 The Last Temptation of Randy (released as VOD in 2020)
- 2013 Sammy J & Randy's Difficult First Album (Audio)
- 2015 Sammy J and Randy LIVE (DVD)
- 2018 Randy Writes a Novel (DVD, YouTube)
- 2021 The Book Of Randicus (DVD, VOD)
- 2021 Purple Privilege (YouTube)
- 2022 Smug Druggles (YouTube)
- 2023 The Book of Randicus (YouTube)
- 2024 Feltopia (YouTube)
- 2026 First Banana (YouTube)

=== Radio ===
- 2024 Randy Feltface's Destruction Manual (BBC Radio 4)
- 2026 Randy Feltface's Human Handbook

== Awards and nominations ==
=== ARIA Music Awards ===
The ARIA Music Awards is an annual awards ceremony held by the Australian Recording Industry Association. They commenced in 1987.

Year	Nominee / work	Award	Result	Ref.
2013	Bin Night (with Sammy J)	Best Comedy Release	Nominated	
2015	Live (with Sammy J)	Best Comedy Release	Nominated	

=== Other awards ===
- Winner: Best Comedy, Perth Fringe World 2014
- Winner: Barry Award, Melbourne International Comedy Festival (MICF) 2010 (with Sammy J)
- Winner: Groggy Squirrel Readers Award, MICF 2010 (with Sammy J)
- Nominee: Best Comedy, Adelaide Fringe 2012 (With Sammy J)
- Nominee: Golden Gibbo Award: MICF 2009
