= Colin Lane =

Australian comedian and actor

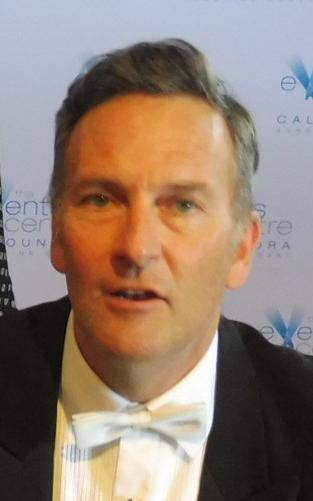
- Colin Lane, 2014
- Born: 25 March 1965 (age 61); Perth, Western Australia, Australia
- Notable work: Member of Lano and Woodley (1987–2006, 2017–present) and Ready Steady Cook (2011–2013)

Comedy career
- Years active: 1987–present
- Medium: Television, stage

Colin Stuart Lane (born 25 March 1965) is an Australian comedian, actor and TV host, best known for being one-half of comedy duo Lano and Woodley.

== Lano and Woodley ==
Lane performed with fellow comedian Frank Woodley as part of the duo Lano and Woodley for a period of almost 20 years. The two met through theatresports in the mid-1980s and first performed together at an open mike night at the Prince Patrick Hotel in Collingwood, Victoria, in 1987 along with their friend Scott Casley, calling themselves the Found Objects.

Over the next six years, the trio performed in venues throughout Australia and at the Edinburgh Festival Fringe. They became semi-regulars on ABC TV's The Big Gig, a show known for boosting the careers of new comedy acts, had their own commercial radio show for six months and were part of the short-lived Seven Network sketch show The Comedy Sale. When in 1992 Casley moved away to Alice Springs, Woodley and Lane decided to continue as a duo, drawing their name from childhood nicknames.

As Lano and Woodley, the two adopt humorous onstage personas, with Woodley playing a "goofy innocent" who is frequently bullied by Lane's pompous, controlling character. Their first show as a comedy duo, "Fence", debuted in 1993. It toured throughout Australia, winning the Moosehead Award at the Melbourne International Comedy Festival for best act and was eventually taken the Edinburgh Festival Fringe in 1994, where it won the prestigious Perrier Comedy Award. Subsequent live productions have included "Curtains", "Glitzy", "Slick", "Bruiser", "The Island" and their 2006 farewell show, "Goodbye" which won the 2006 Helpmann Award for Best Comedy. In 2000, they co-hosted the televised Melbourne Comedy Gala.

Woodley and Lane have created two television shows together. The Adventures of Lano and Woodley, which premiered on the ABC in 1997, was a comedy series which featured the duo living together in a fictional suburban Melbourne flat and frequently getting into trouble. It aired for two seasons, airing in 38 other countries. Although they were offered the opportunity to make the series in England, the pair decided to remain in Australia because they did not want to live in London. In 2004 their live show, The Island, was filmed as a TV special and aired on The Comedy Channel. The duo have also released an album, Lano & Woodley Sing Songs, and a novel, Housemeeting.

In 2006, after close to 20 years of working together, Woodley and Lane decided to part ways. Woodley states the split was due to a desire to pursue new challenges. "We just got to the stage where we felt we had to make a decision," he says. "Either we were going to spend the next 20 years doing this, this'd be our career, our lives forever. And that wouldn't have been a terrible thing. Or we could go, 'Let's have a bit more variety in our lives'." In one final tour, the duo travelled through 37 Australian cities with their farewell show, "Goodbye".

In 2016, Colin reunited with Frank Woodley for a surprise performance as part of the Melbourne Comedy Festival's 30th Birthday Bash.

In 2018, the duo reprised their roles as Lano and Woodley for FLY, a show which won the 2018 Melbourne Comedy Festival People's Choice Award.

== Solo work ==
Since Lano and Woodley's farewell tour, Lane has appeared in Don's Party for the Melbourne Theatre Company, followed by a season with the Sydney Theatre Company. In 2008, he was cast as Pooh-Bah in Essgee Productions' The Mikado.

Lane wrote and performed a solo cabaret show, I'm Not Sure About the Music, about a man who loses the music and finds it again. He performed it in the Melbourne International Comedy Festival in 2009 and again for a limited return season in 2010.

He has made numerous appearances on Australian television, having had guest appearances on Kath & Kim, Good News Week, Spicks and Specks, Welcher & Welcher, Thank God You're Here, Neighbours, All Star Family Feud and Show Me the Movie!. He has also been a presenter for two Nine Network shows, Wine Me, Dine Me and Kings of Comedy. His film credits include Jimeoin's 2005 movie The Extra, in which he played a movie extra, Danny, and the short film White Lines.

In 2011, Lane was a fill in host on The Circle for both Gorgi Coghlan (early 2011) and Chrissie Swan (late 2011) while they both took maternity leave. Also in 2011, it was announced that Lane would host Ready Steady Cook replacing Peter Everett from June that year.

In 2013, 2014, 2017, and 2020 Lane appeared as a panellist on the UK comedy show QI. He also made an appearance on Channel 7's SlideShow. In November 2014, he appeared as a late replacement on the inaugural cruise of the Australian performing arts on the MS Radiance of the Seas along with, among others, Cheryl Barker, David Hobson, Teddy Tahu Rhodes, Simon Tedeschi, Elaine Paige, Marina Prior, and Jonathon Welch. With David Hobson, he appeared since 2016 at various festivals in the show "In Tails – A Comedian and an Opera Singer's Worlds Collide" which also toured Australia.
