= Rachel Berger =

Australian comedian

- Born: Israel
- Occupation: Comedian
- Years active: 1986-present

Rachel Berger is an Australian comedian, actress, and writer. Berger was born in Israel to Polish Jewish parents and emigrated to Melbourne at the age of five.

She is a "performer who delivers rapid-fire lines with assertive and acerbic virtuosity," who has made her name as a stand-up comedian, staging "confronting and politically incorrect" productions including Perfect, Clenched Buttocks, Loose Cannon, The She Comic, Comedy Siren, and Berger Republic.

In 2008, Berger wrote and performed Hold the Pickle. A major departure from her previous work, Hold the Pickle is a monologue that traces her parents' flight from Nazi-occupied Poland to Israel during the Second World War, to running a delicatessen in Acland Street, St Kilda, a Melbourne suburb.

In 2008, Hold the Pickle was nominated for three Green Room Awards: Best Female Performer in an Independent Theatre Production, New Writing for the Australian Stage, and Lighting Design.

In 2010, Berger was cast as Cora in the Australian Production of Calendar Girls, which toured for four months.

Berger is the author of Whaddya Mean You're Allergic to Rubber? (Penguin Books, 2001) and regularly co-hosts The Conversation Hour with Jon Faine on Radio 774 ABC in Melbourne.
