= Frank Woodley =

Australian comedian (born 1968)

- Born: Frank Wood; 29 February 1968 (age 58); Melbourne, Victoria, Australia
- Notable work: Lano and Woodley

Comedy career
- Years active: 1986–present
- Medium: Stand-up, television, theatre, books
- Website: frankwoodley.com.au

Frank Woodley (né Wood; born 29 February 1968) is an Australian comedian, author and musician who is best known for his work alongside Colin Lane as part of the comedic duo Lano and Woodley. The two performed together for almost 20 years in live shows, a television series and an album of comedic songs, before deciding to pursue individual careers in 2006. They announced their reformation in November 2017.

== Personal life ==
Woodley was born Frank Wood, the youngest of seven children. He grew up in suburban Melbourne, where his family ran a milk bar in Glen Waverley. He adopted the stage name "Frank Woodley"—drawn from a childhood nickname—when he began performing as part of the comedy duo Lano and Woodley in 1993. In 2000 he changed his name by deed poll to avoid confusion.

Woodley is married with a son and daughter and lives in Melbourne's inner north.

== Career ==
=== Lano and Woodley ===
Woodley first performed with fellow comedian Colin Lane as part of the duo Lano and Woodley for a period of almost 20 years. The two met through theatresports in the mid-1980s and first performed together at an open mike night at the Prince Patrick Hotel in Collingwood, Victoria, in 1987 along with their friend Scott Casley, calling themselves the Found Objects. Over the next six years, the trio performed in venues throughout Australia and at the Edinburgh Festival Fringe. They became semi-regulars on ABC TV's The Big Gig, a show known for boosting the careers of new comedy acts. They also had their own commercial radio show for six months and were part of the short-lived Seven Network sketch show The Comedy Sale. In 1992, when Casley moved to Alice Springs, Woodley and Lane decided to continue as a duo, drawing their name from childhood nicknames.

As Lano and Woodley, the two adopt humorous onstage personas, with Woodley playing a "goofy innocent" who is frequently bullied by Lane's pompous, controlling character. Their first show as a comedy duo, Fence, debuted in 1993. It toured throughout Australia, winning the Moosehead Award at the Melbourne International Comedy Festival for best act and was eventually taken to the Edinburgh Festival Fringe in 1994 where it won the Perrier Comedy Award. Subsequent live productions have included Curtains, Glitzy, Slick, Bruiser, The Island and their 2006 farewell show, Goodbye. In 2000, they co-hosted the televised Melbourne Comedy Gala.

Woodley and Lane have created two television shows together. The Adventures of Lano and Woodley, which premiered on the ABC in 1997, was a comedy series which featured the duo living together in a fictional suburban Melbourne flat and frequently getting into trouble. It aired for two seasons, becoming the first Australian show to be sold to the BBC and airing in 38 other countries. Although they were offered the opportunity to make the series in England, the pair decided to remain in Australia because they did not want to live in London. In 2004 a live show, The Island, was filmed as a TV special and aired on The Comedy Channel. The duo have also released an album, Lano & Woodley Sing Songs, and a novel, Housemeeting.

In 2006, after close to 20 years of working together, Woodley and Lane decided to part ways. Woodley stated that the split was due to a desire to pursue new challenges. "We just got to the stage where we felt we had to make a decision", he said. "Either we were going to spend the next 20 years doing this, this'd be our career, our lives forever. And that wouldn't have been a terrible thing. Or we could go, 'Let's have a bit more variety in our lives'." In one final tour, the duo travelled through 37 Australian cities with their farewell show, Goodbye.

In 2018, the duo reprised their roles as Lano and Woodley for a show titled Fly which won the 2018 Melbourne Comedy Festival People’s Choice Award.

=== Solo work ===
Woodley made his solo debut in 2003 at the Melbourne International Comedy Festival with The Happy Dickwi, a show about "a whole lot of unrelated ideas". He has since performed a number of solo stand-up shows, and in 2008 debuted a one-man play entitled Possessed. Directed by Kate Denborough and featuring music from Paul Mac, Possessed is the story of Louie, a lonely recluse who falls in love with, and becomes possessed by, the ghost of a 19th-century shipwreck victim. Woodley says that the show came out of the desire to do a big solo show and his interest in doing a romantic comedy: "So I was thinking that maybe I could do a solo romantic comedy where I fell in love with myself. Although it was just a stupid joke initially, I started thinking about having a ghost possess me and then I fall in love with the ghost. I have to help free her from the curse she's under." The show has toured both nationally and internationally, and draws inspiration from Buster Keaton, Charlie Chaplin, Don Adams, Peter Sellers, Jerry Lewis and Laurel and Hardy.

Woodley played a television vet named "Frank Woodley" in the twelfth episode of the 1998 Australia television series The Games.

Woodley has made regular guest appearances on Australian television, including Spicks and Specks, Good News Week, Thank God You're Here, The Sideshow, Big Question, Rove Live, Australia's Brainiest Comedian and Show Me the Movie!. In 2008, he appeared in a series of television advertisements for Metlink promoting public transport in Melbourne, in particular buses.

In 2007, Woodley performed in the stage show The Complete Works of William Shakespeare (Abridged), a 97-minute production which encompasses 37 Shakespearian plays.

From 2008 to 2009, Woodley co-hosted a show on The Comedy Channel called Aussie Gold every Saturday night.

In 2012, Woodley had a small role in the Australian comedy film Kath & Kimderella. In 2015, he co-starred as the dogcatcher in Oddball.

Aside from being a comedian, Woodley is also a children's author and has written a series of children's books called Kizmet.

In 2020, Woodley participated in the first Australian season of the Amazon Prime comedy competition series LOL: Last One Laughing, going on to win the grand prize.

In 2022, Woodley was appointed as one of the team captains in Would I Lie to You? Australia alongside Chris Taylor.

In 2023, Woodley had a small role as a fertility specialist in the Australian drama comedy Love Me.

In May 2026, Woodley appeared on episodes two and three of the Australian version of Guy Montgomery's Guy Mont-Spelling Bee

== Woodley ==
A television project entitled Woodley screened in 2012. It is a half-hour visual comedy about a largely innocent-seeming man who is caught up in real-world problems. The series follows his attempts to bond with his daughter and his estranged wife (Justine Clarke), though this proves difficult for the accident-prone Woodley, as she tries to move forward with her life with her new partner Greg. The show was announced with a number of other projects in a $1.2 million funding from the Victorian government. The show premiered on Wednesday 22 February at 8.00pm on ABC1. The show is built around an extensive use of visual (often slapstick) humour, rather than dialogue, although this is also used sparingly.
