= Light Timber Construction schools =

Type of school building 1954–1977, Victoria

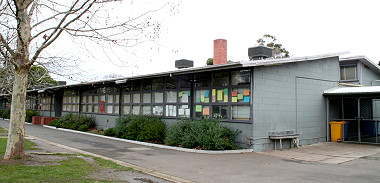
Princes Hill Primary School, a typical school built in the Light Timber Construction style

Light Timber Construction (or LTC) was the name given to a standardised architectural design used for the construction of hundreds of state school buildings in Victoria, Australia, between 1954 and 1977. LTC school buildings were designed for speed of construction, uniform appearance and low cost. In the 2000s with growing enrolments especially in Melbourne many LTC school buildings were either being demolished and replaced, or refurbished, and so intact original examples are becoming rare.

== History ==
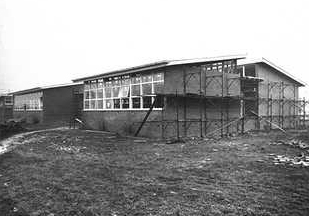
The Leighton School (now Croxton School) under construction, 1956

Following the end of World War II, there was a sudden increase in the natural birth rate, or "baby boom", in Victoria, as well as a massive increase in immigration. This led to a sharp rise in demand for school places, which the Department of Education in Victoria was struggling to meet. In addition the Department had lowered the age of school admission to five years in 1946, and since the War there had was a substantial increase in students continuing into high school. A report commissioned in 1949 by the new director of the Department of Education, Sir Alan Hollick Ramsay estimated that local high school enrolments would increase by 20,000 students over the next decade. Simultaneously, on account of the war, there was a shortage of building materials and labour in Victoria. In response to this crisis prefabricated buildings were seen as a solution, with ex-military huts pressed into service along with imported buildings. Several hundred aluminium classrooms manufactured by the Bristol Corporation were imported from England for use throughout the state until the program was ended in the mid-1950s.

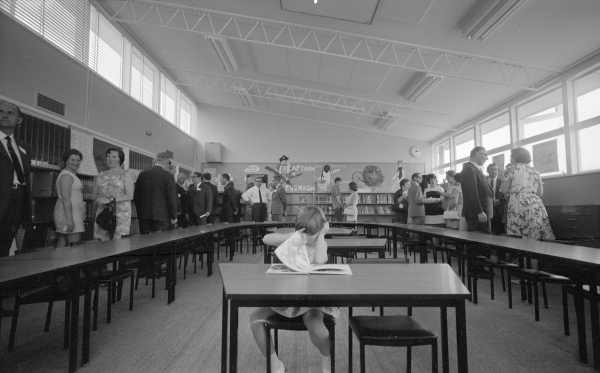
A Light Timber Construction style library in a primary school, showing typical architectural features

Hollick recommended to the State Government that a standardised design for all state schools be adopted, as such a design would reduce the expense of individually designing each school, and would allow school construction to proceed more efficiently whilst using less building resources. In 1952-3 Department of Public Works chief architect Percy Everett and his Minister, Samuel Merrifeld developed the "Light Timber Construction" (or LTC) design, and by June 1953 85 of an initial 200 had already been built. By the beginning of the 1954 school term, hundreds had been added to primary schools across the state, and they were used for nine new high schools and teachers college as well. A news report noted that:

"They are not architectural gems. It is reasonable to wonder how our great-grandchildren will view them when, they are pupils (for these are permanent buildings). But It Is unreasonable to condemn them, as has been done, as unsightly sheds. They are realistic, sound, flexible answers to the desperate problem of school accommodation. They are emergency buildings, but happily not panic measures. They provide bright, healthy rooms, and they indicate a refreshing break from the obese and overstyled modernism of much recent Government building."

A number of initial prototype schools were built in the LTC style, as it was tested and refined. An early example, still in existence, is the Croxton School in the Melbourne suburb of Northcote. Initially codenamed the "Leighton School" and classed as "prototype six", this school was built in 1956 and provides an example of the refinement of the LTC design. By the end of the 1950s the standardised design had been used for many completely new schools, as well as additions to many already existing.

The schools were built by a number of contractors: a contract in 1954 for £5,984 gave Swan Hill High School two LTC classrooms, the same year Heywood Consolidated School had six LTC classrooms erected for £9,800. Electrical works were in separate contracts, the 1955 contract for the electrical installation in six LTC classrooms at Heidelberg West State School was £375. The LTC design was used for more than general classrooms: the 1957 contract for the erection of a trade annex in light timber construction and masonry veneer at Bairnsdale Technical School was for £16,478; in 1962 a modified Domestic Arts wing was built at Mortlake High School in light timber construction with a concrete veneer for £23,713.

From this period until 1976, hundreds of similar LTC school buildings were constructed by the Department of Education across Victoria. Whilst small design variations existed on different sites, and between primary and secondary schools, the overall construction method and aesthetic remained the same. Eventually, the demand for school places fell and the Department of Education resumed constructing state schools with individual designs.

== Design features ==
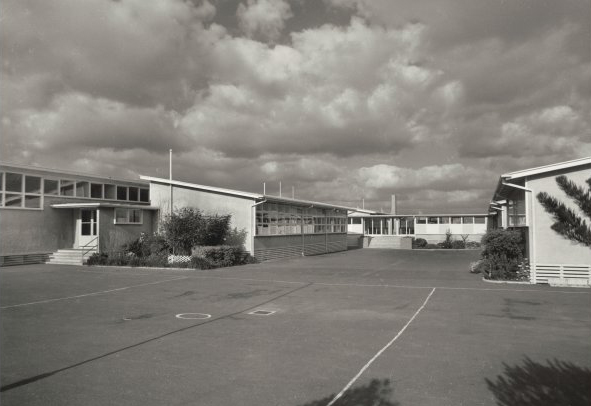
A typical Light Timber Construction style school building in Mentone, Victoria

Light Timber Construction schools, as the name suggests, were constructed using wooden framing. External walls are either clad in timber, sheet metal, brick, or cement tile (the most common option). Rooftops were always clad with corrugated iron, and supported by zig-zag steel rafters. LTC schools were always built as a single storey. Where multiple school wings were required, buildings were often linked with an iron covered-way in the case of primary schools, or a link corridor in the case of high schools.

LTC school buildings always consist of long central corridors, from which classrooms are constructed on either side. Typically, there will be a continuous span of classrooms on one side, whilst intervals will be left between clusters of classrooms on the alternate side, to allow for additional exits and natural light to penetrate the corridor. Occasionally, a single run of classrooms was built with an attached corridor. The corridors typically have low ceilings (approximately 3 metres), and capacity for bags (primary schools) or lockers (high schools) to be stored along the walls. A long series of windows provides visual contact with classrooms.

Classrooms are typically entered through sliding doors from the corridor. The ceilings of classrooms are elevated above the corridor, and tilt away so that one row of windows connects the room with the corridor, whilst another row above provides natural light from outside. On the external side, either two or three horizontal rows of wooden-framed windows provide light from outside. LTC classrooms were typically furnished in a uniform way, with built-in blackboards and cupboards at the front of the room, fluorescent lighting from above, and venetian blinds on the windows. Most classrooms had polished wooden floorboards, which were later carpeted-over.

At the secondary level additional double classrooms were equipped with the needs of specialist subjects. Science rooms had a raised demonstration table at the front, benches with Bunsen burners, sinks at the side and some were equipped with a roll down blackboard.

== Criticism and future ==
Whilst the LTC design provided government with a cheap and efficient method for rapidly constructing schools, the design meant that buildings were hot in summer and cold in winter due to poor insulation, and were often viewed as being "industrial" and "sterile" fitting a "factory model" of schooling. The term 'chicken coop' was coined, referring to both the uniformity of the design with rows of high windows, and to the noise created when the bell rang and students changed rooms: a cacophony resembling a 'million clucking hens'. The classrooms were supposed to be multipurpose but in reality they only suited a very general curriculum and did not cater well for specific subject areas requiring hands-on activities and display areas. Nevertheless, many in the community approved. Adults who had experienced pre-war education were more than happy to see both school design and teaching change. They saw new schools that looked attractive, modern, and functional, and a progressive future for education.

As methods of education has changed, modern educational specialists criticise the design of long corridors and rows of classrooms as being old-fashioned and uninspiring. The low-set ceilings of LTC corridors tended to make these spaces dark, and many schools have undergone refurbishment so that the height of the corridor ceilings has been lifted, and skylights installed. Other schools opened out internal walls and added non-institutional furniture to create a more flowing and integrated environment.

Owing to their cheap construction, and funding cuts that were made to education in the 1980s and 1990s, many LTC school buildings aged poorly, becoming shabby and run-down, becoming extremely expensive to maintain as they were not intended to last more than 20 years. In 2006 the Australian Education Union said that the cost simply replacing LTC schools is $1.9 billion, and would take 30 years at the then rates of Government spending. The State Government's Victorian Schools Plan released in 2006 committed to rebuild or renew all government schools by 2017, leading to many LTC school buildings being demolished or substantially renovated and modified. Consequently, intact examples of this school design in original condition are becoming very rare.

== See also ==
- Education in Victoria
- List of schools in Victoria, Australia
- New Zealand standard school buildings
