= Lano and Woodley =

Australian comedy duo

- Origin: Melbourne, Victoria, Australia
- Genres: Comedy Slapstick
- Years active: 1986–2006, 2017–present
- Members: Colin Lane; Frank Woodley

Lano and Woodley (Colin Lane and Frank Woodley) are an Australian comedy duo. Previously, the two had been part of comedy trio The Found Objects along with Scott Casley. Casley left and so Lano and Woodley debuted as a double-act in March 1993 at Melbourne's Prince Patrick Hotel. Their act features sketch comedy and slapstick theatre. Their television show The Adventures of Lano and Woodley aired on the ABC in 1997 and 1999. In 1994, they won the Edinburgh Fringe Perrier Comedy Award. They have written one book, Housemeeting, published in 1996.

Lano and Woodley reunited to tour nationally with a new show named Fly, beginning in Canberra in March 2018.

== Career ==
=== Stage shows ===
Their stage productions include Curtains, Fence, Glitzy, Slick, Bruiser, The Island and Goodbye - all original shows that they wrote and performed themselves. The show Fence was co-written and directed by Neill Gladwin who also directed Curtains. After their reunion, four more stage productions have been performed including Fly, Lano & Woodley, Moby Dick and Lano & Woodley in Space.

=== Bruiser ===
The show follows the adventures of Frank and Colin after a nasty confrontation at the local gym where Frank accidentally is challenged to a fight by the local strongman 'Bruiser'. Both Lano and Woodley alternate between playing themselves and the characters Bruiser and Juliet (the love interest) throughout the show through the use of costumes (at times forced to play each other as well).

=== 1996: Housemeeting ===
Housemeeting, a book by Lano and Woodley, was published by Penguin Books in 1996, with illustrations by Woodley and a foreword by Andrew Denton.

The story follows their conversations after Colin announces that after years of them living together, Frank has to move out. Throughout the book, Frank makes several desperate attempts to change Colin's mind, none of which seem to work.

The story is written in the style of a script, with several chapters covering various subjects (e.g. nicknames, cooking, graffiti etc.) that Colin and Frank discuss (and argue about) as Frank prepares to move out. The style in which it is written is very self-referential and often breaks the fourth wall by talking directly to the reader, putting in deliberate spelling mistakes and filling pages with ellipses (or nothing at all).

=== 1997: The Adventures of Lano and Woodley ===
Lano and Woodley created their own television show called The Adventures of Lano and Woodley which debuted on Australian TV on ABC in 1997 with the episode "The Girlfriend". In 2004, all 12 episodes were released on a 2-disc DVD, entitled The Complete Adventures of Lano and Woodley.

=== 2004: The Island ===
In 2004 - 2005, the comedy duo took a tour across Australia called The Island. The show consisted of comedy sketches, songs and interaction with the audience, all based around them being stranded on a desert island. A stand-out feature of this performance was the one major set piece used: a motorised, revolving platform, which was used as a stairway, aeroplane, palm tree and court room stand. This performance has been released on DVD and is periodically screened on The Comedy Channel (Foxtel).

=== 2005: Lano & Woodley Sing Songs ===
October 2005 saw the release of Lano & Woodley Sing Songs, a CD recording of their live performance at the Hi-Fi Bar in Melbourne as part of their Australian "Sing Songs" tour. The show consisted of songs that had been written and performed over the course of their career as a comedy duo. The CDs were sold at each of the touring venues, as well as in most music retail and department stores.

=== 2006: Goodbye ===
In February 2006, they announced their final tour, entitled Goodbye, after 20 years of performing together. The show premiered at the 2006 Adelaide Fringe Festival in March 2006 and was performed in 37 cities and towns across Australia, selling out at the Melbourne International Comedy Festival in May 2006 where they filmed the show for DVD. This recorded performance, from 6 May, marked the first time they have ever wrestled an audience member to the ground. It also saw quite a few fumbles by the pair, because they were unnerved by the irregular lighting required for the audience to be seen on the DVD (house lights on the audience are usually dimmed). The show featured material from previous shows, as well as some new material. The last show of their Goodbye tour was performed on 11 November 2006 at the Regent Theatre, Melbourne. The DVD release received an ARIA nomination for best comedy release.

The real reason for their goodbye, according to Colin Lane (stated both on stage and appearing on Andrew Denton's Enough Rope interview show), is summed up like this: "Imagine spending 20 years driving in a car with your best friend." They have both stated that they are dissolving Lano and Woodley so that they do not end up hating each other five years down the track. Both have also expressed interest in exploring other careers.

=== 2017: Comeback and Fly ===
On 13 November 2017, Lano and Woodley announced they were reuniting and going on tour nationally with a new show named Fly, which began in Canberra in March 2018.

== Discography ==
=== Releases ===
Title	Details
Lano & Woodley Sing Songs	Released: October 2005; Label: Liberation Music (LIBCD7182.2); Format: CD
Goodbye	Released: December 2006; Label: Liberation Music (LIBDVD1071); Format: DVD

== Awards ==
=== ARIA Music Awards ===
The ARIA Music Awards is an annual awards ceremony that recognises excellence, innovation, and achievement across all genres of Australian music. It commenced in 1987.

Year	Nominee / work	Award	Result
2006	Lano & Woodley Sing Songs	Best Comedy Release	Won
2007	Goodbye	Best Comedy Release	Nominated

=== Mo Awards ===
The Australian Entertainment Mo Awards (commonly known informally as the Mo Awards), were annual Australian entertainment industry awards. They recognise achievements in live entertainment in Australia from 1975 to 2016. Lano and Woodley won one award in that time.

Year	Nominee / work	Award	Result (wins only)
2000	Lano and Woodley	Comedy Group of the Year	Won
