= Wilson da Silva =

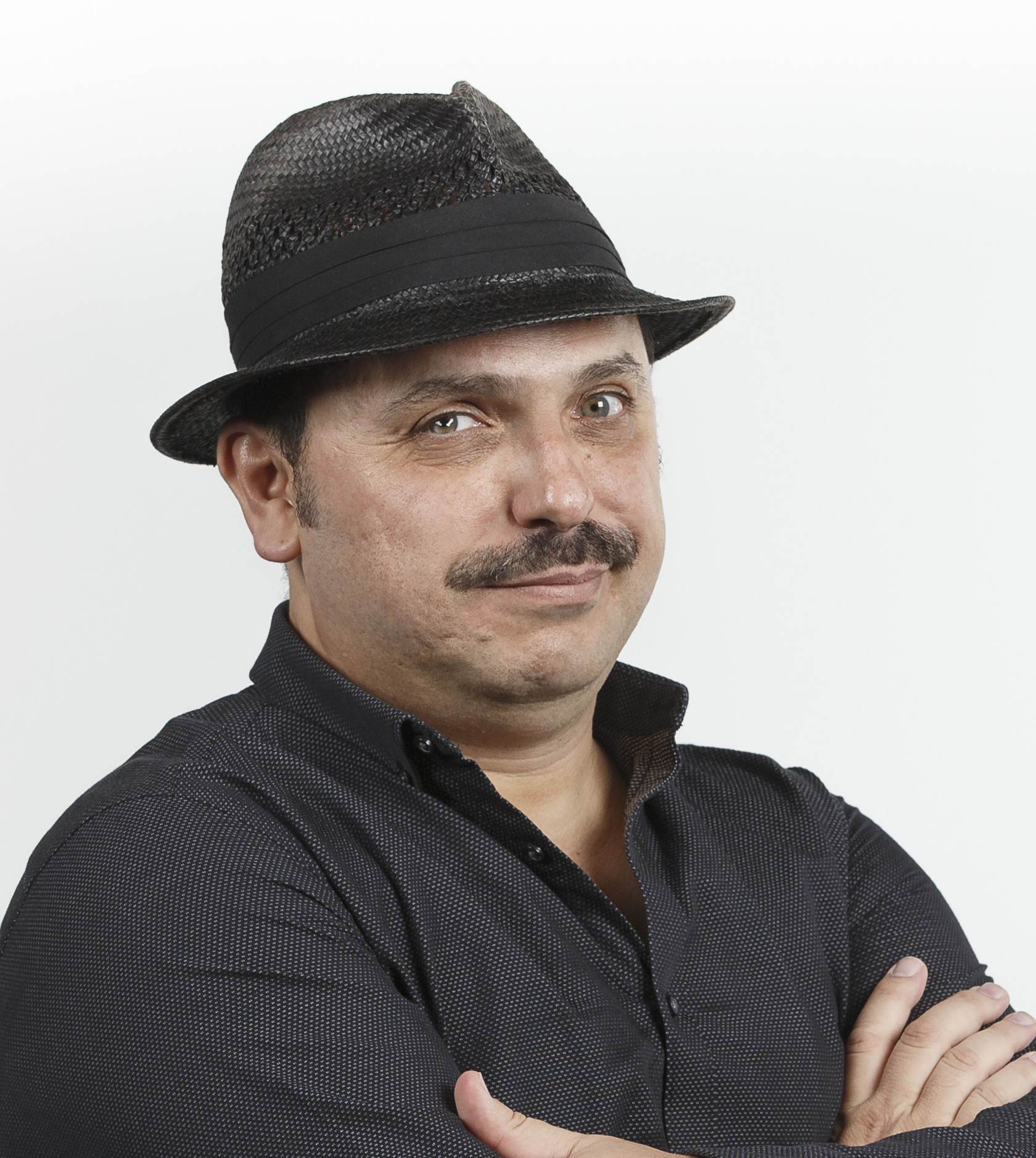
- Born: Brazil
- Occupations: Feature Writer, Science Journalist and Editor
- Writing career
- Notable awards: AFI Best Documentary (2000); Publishers Australia Editor of the Year (2005, 2006)

Wilson da Silva is an Australian feature writer, science journalist, editor and documentary filmmaker who has worked in magazines, newswires, newspapers, television and online. He is a co-founder and the long-serving former editor of Cosmos, an Australian science magazine.

== Career ==
Da Silva has been an on-air science reporter and producer for Australian Broadcasting Corporation television, a staff journalist on The Age and The Sydney Morning Herald newspapers, a foreign correspondent for Reuters, science editor of ABC Online, a correspondent for London's New Scientist magazine, and served as managing editor of the science magazines Newton, 21C and Science Spectra.

He was the founding Content Director of the Waterloo Global Science Initiative, and Moderator of Equinox Summit: Energy 2030, the inaugural meeting at the Perimeter Institute for Theoretical Physics in Canada, which sought to apply science and technology to global problems. From 2006–09, he was editor-in-chief of the Green Lifestyle Magazine, an environmental consumer lifestyle title that was the country's first carbon neutral magazine and produced on 100% recycled paper.

He is the creator of HELLO FROM EARTH, a web-based initiative to send messages from the public, each just 160 characters in length, to Gliese 581d, the nearest Earth-like planet outside the Solar System. Created as a science communication exercise for 2009 National Science Week in Australia, it collected nearly 26,000 messages that were beamed by NASA's Canberra Deep Space Communication Complex on 28 August 2009.

The winner of 32 awards, including Editor of the Year (twice – in 2005 and 2006, Publishers Australia Excellence Awards), the 1997 Human Rights Award for Print Journalism and the 1996 Michael Daley Award for Science Journalism. He has also written and produced two prize-winning documentaries, including The Diplomat, the film that depicted Nobel Peace laureate José Ramos-Horta and his eventually successful struggle to win independence for East Timor. The film won da Silva and fellow producer Sally Browning the 2000 Australian Film Institute Award for Best Documentary.

Da Silva served as president of the World Federation of Science Journalists, Australian Science Communicators, and Australian Museum Society, and as a board member of the Australian Society of Authors. He is one of the founders of Science in the Pub, an innovative public communication initiative which was jointly awarded the 2000 Eureka Prize for the Promotion of Science.

In October 2009, da Silva created and hosted six Science in the Pub sessions for the Quantum to Cosmos festival at Perimeter Institute in Waterloo, Ontario, and also hosted two Quantum to Cosmos panels. In his opening panel, he asked nine physicists, "what keeps you awake at night?" After departing as editor-in-chief of Cosmos in 2013, he has stated that he plans to "sit back and either get back into films or maybe write some books."

He makes frequent appearances on radio and television in Australia, including breakfast TV shows Sunrise and Today, and has spoken at many public lectures and conferences, among them the UNESCO World Science Forum, the EuroScience Open Forum, and Japan's annual Science and Technology in Society Forum. Born in Brazil of Portuguese ancestry, he now lives in Sydney.

== Filmography ==
=== Australian Broadcasting Corporation ===
| Year | TV Show | Story | Role | Duration |
|---|---|---|---|---|
| 2004 | Catalyst | Baroness and the Brain | Reporter | 5:11 |
| 2000 | Quantum | Roman Theatre | Producer, writer, presenter | 4:41 |
| 2000 | Quantum | Mirror Matter | Producer, writer, presenter | 7:55 |
| 2000 | Quantum | Bomb Snooper | Producer, writer, presenter | 4:50 |
| 1999 | Quantum | The Computer CSIRAC | Producer, writer, presenter | 5:15 |
| 1999 | Quantum | Frog Killer | Producer, writer, presenter | 4:41 |
| 1999 | Quantum | Empty Pouches | Producer, writer, presenter | 6:48 |
| 1999 | Quantum | Mining the Deep | Producer, writer, presenter | 6:31 |
| 1999 | Quantum | Oils Ain't Oils | Reporter | 7:44 |
| 1999 | Quantum | Dying Eyes | Producer, writer, presenter | 7:18 |
| 1999 | Quantum | Baby Skin | Writer, presenter | 4:57 |
| 1999 | Quantum' | Malaria Vaccine | Co-Producer, writer, presenter | 5:03 |
| 1999 | Quantum | Requiem for the Toothfish | Producer, writer, presenter | 9:15 |
| 1999 | Quantum | Planet Hunters | Co-Producer, writer, presenter | 9:03 |
| 1999 | Quantum | Can You Catch a Heart Attack? | Co-Producer, writer, presenter | 7:38 |
| 1999 | Quantum | Electron Man | Writer, presenter | 7:54 |
| 1999 | Quantum | Cosmic Antigravity | Producer, writer, presenter | 9:07 |
| 1998 | Quantum | Troubled Waters | Producer, writer, presenter | 10:01 |
| 1998 | Quantum' | Girl Talk | Writer, presenter | 6:08 |
| 1998 | Quantum | Premature Concerns | Writer, presenter | 9:58 |
| 1998 | Quantum | Roman Lead | Producer, writer, presenter | 6:53 |
| 1998 | Quantum | Thorium Reactors | Writer, presenter | 7:17 |
| 1998 | Quantum | Male Contraceptive | Writer, presenter | 5:46 |
| 1998 | Quantum | Landscape Archaeology | Writer, presenter | 9:22 |
| 1998 | Quantum | Mind's Eye | Writer, presenter | 9:40 |
| 1998 | Quantum | Passing the Bug: The End of Antibiotics? | Co-Producer, writer, presenter | 27:30 |

=== Independent Documentaries ===
| Year | Film | Role | Notes | Duration |
|---|---|---|---|---|
| 2000 | The Diplomat | Producer & Writer | Documentary centred on Nobel Peace Prize-winner José Ramos-Horta and his 24-year struggle to liberate of East Timor from occupation by Indonesia. | Feature 81 mins, other 56 mins |
