= Adam Spencer =

Australian mathematician, comedian and radio presenter (born 1969)

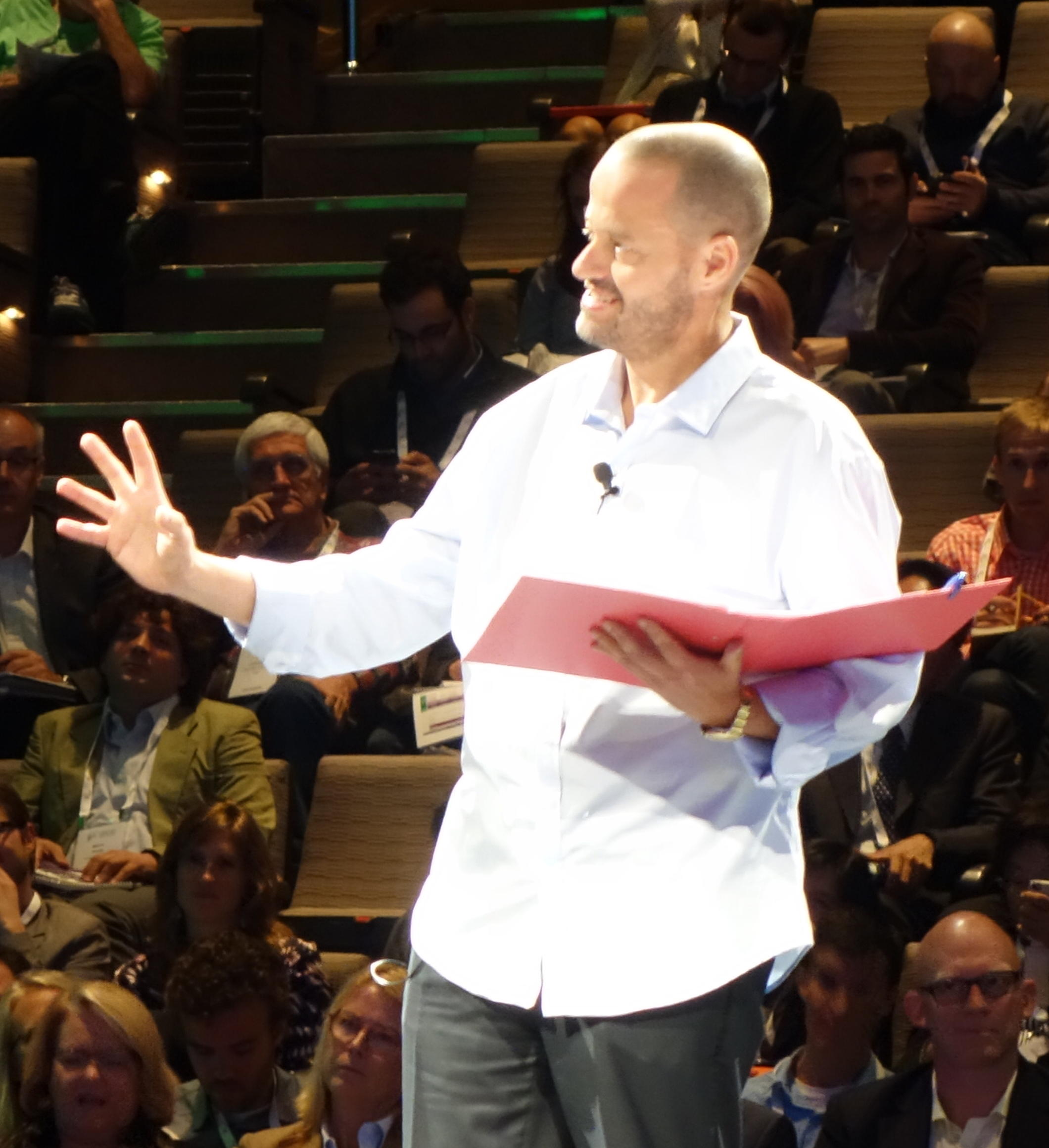
- Spencer in 2014
- Born: Adam Barrington Spencer; 29 January 1969 (age 57); Sydney, Australia
- Partner(s): Melanie Mossman Spencer (m. 2006–2016); Leah Boonthanom (m. 2022–present)
- Children: 2
- Presenting career
- Station: 702 ABC Sydney
- Network: ABC Local Radio
- Country: Australia
- Previous shows: 702 ABC Sydney (2006–2013); Triple J Breakfast (1999–2004)
- Website: adamspencer.com.au

Adam Barrington Spencer (born 29 January 1969) is an Australian comedian, media personality and former radio presenter. He first came to fame when he won his round of the comedic talent search Raw Comedy in 1996. Soon thereafter, he began working at Triple J, on mid-dawn and drive shifts before hosting the Triple J Breakfast Show with Wil Anderson. He later hosted Breakfast on 702 ABC Sydney.

He is a patron of science-related events and programs, including the University of Sydney's Sleek Geeks Science Prize (category in the Eureka Prize). He collaborated with Karl Kruszelnicki for the long-running Sleek Geek Week tour (as part of National Science Week). He hosts events and panels, writes mathematical recreation books, and performs his own comedy at events around the country.

He is a supporter of the Australian rules football team, the Sydney Swans, and was declared their number one ticket holder for the 2016 season.

== Early life ==
Born on 29 January 1969, in Sydney, Spencer grew up in the Hunters Hill/Gladesville area.

A few hours after birth, he had a seizure, and doctors found blood between his brain and scalp. Twice in the first two days of his life, a priest was called to give the last rites. Between the ages of three until about 11, Spencer underwent a series of operations by eye surgeon Fred Hollows. The deadening of the eyelid muscle led to permanent ptosis (drooping of the upper eyelid) and noticeable facial asymmetry. He later received a transplant from a donor (who had been in a motorcycle accident) in an operation, allowing him to "open" that eye.

His father Larry, died from prostate cancer in 2004. He has a brother and a sister.

Spencer attended Boronia Park Public School, where his favourite teacher, Ms Russell, encouraged his love of mathematics when he was in second grade, in 1976. In 1981 he won a scholarship to attend St Aloysius' College in Sydney, and was a vice-captain of the College and Captain of the Australian Schools Debating Team. He graduated with a score of 200 out of 200 in four-unit maths.

His earliest job was selling newspapers, and during university worked as a dishwasher at a pancake restaurant. He was a member of Scouts Australia.

Spencer was the first in his family to attend university, and originally enrolled to study arts-law. This included economics and philosophy, but he dropped out of those, taking up maths to "round it out", but eventually changed to a maths major. He graduated from the University of Sydney with a Bachelor of Science with first class honours in pure mathematics in 1991, residing at St Paul's College during his time there. While at university, he was one of the world's top-ranked debaters, reaching the final round of the World Universities Debating Championship three times (1990, 1992, 1996) and winning World's Best Individual Speaker (1996). He won the Australasian debating championship twice (1988, 1990). He was President of the University of Sydney Union.

== Career ==
He was secretly entered into the Triple J Raw Comedy Championship in 1996 by a former girlfriend, and won the NSW championship (although this has also been reported as winning the second prize, as he came second in the national competition).

=== Television ===
Spencer has been a host of ABC science shows Quantum, FAQ and Sleek Geeks. He was a regular guest on the O'Loghlin variety comedy show since its first episode in June 1999.

In October 2001, he hosted the Visions for a Nation Federation Forum. This focused on the views of leading Australians about the challenges facing Australia in the 21st century. It later screened on the ABC.

In August 2002, he made a guest appearance on Cheez TV (Channel Ten), playing a burglar with an aversion to old Wham! songs.

Years	Title	Screening	Summary
1998–2001	Quantum	ABC TV	
1998–2001	FAQ	ABC TV	As host, Spencer posed themed frequently asked questions to a panel of scientists.
2003	The Hit & Run	The Comedy Channel (Granada productions)	Spencer hosted the 8 episode-series, in which he would create challenges for other comedians. The comedians were placed at an unexpected venue outside their comfort zone, and then had less than a day to create new stand-up routines based on the experience.
2005	Joker Poker	Channel Ten	Spencer hosted Australia's first free-to-air poker TV show.
2008 and 2010	Sleek Geeks	ABC TV	
2009	Good News Week	Channel Ten	
2009–2011	Netball's Festival of Stars	Channel Ten	Played in three celebrity netball matches, representing Team NBCF.
2018–present	Summer Drum	ABC TV	Spencer hosts the 'Summer' series of the ABC's nightly news panel show, The Drum. The program is broadcast every year throughout January.

=== Radio ===
Spencer was spotted by radio station Triple J's senior broadcaster, Helen Razer, at the 1996 Raw Comedy Finals, when he provided a live impromptu weather segment involving mathematical equations. This approach to presenting maths via the weather has been noted by other mathematicians.

He was invited to do occasional work at Triple J, and then hosted segments during the midnight-to-dawn shifts. He did guest spots entitled "Bloking up" on Razer and Judith Lucy's Ladies Lounge afternoon show. When Lucy left Triple J for Melbourne's FOX-FM, he joined as co-host of the Departure Lounge. Helen Razer left in 1998. In 1999, Spencer was later promoted to solo hosting of the breakfast show for approximately 18 months.

Wil Anderson joined Triple J in April 1999, beginning their co-hosting of the breakfast show. The highest-number of mathematical references made by Spencer on an episode the show was 32 instances on 7 March 2001. In 2002, Anderson and Spencer created a fictional metal band, Salmon Hater, with a single 6.66 – One Hundredth of the Number of the Beast. It was rated as number 26 in Triple J's Hottest 100.

Both Anderson and Spencer chose to retire from the breakfast show in 2004. They hosted a comedic tribute show, The Last Time, which toured around Australia and focused on their six years in co-hosting the show. The tribute show's title was a mocking take on John Farnham's farewell tour, which was not actually his last tour.

On 20 February 2006, he began presenting Breakfast on 702 ABC Sydney, replacing Angela Catterns. His hosting was described as having transformed ABC 702 into a "...science and maths, women's sports and soft rock loving place to be..." On 6 December 2013, Spencer hosted his last breakfast radio program for ABC 702, concluding 14 years of radio broadcasting at the age of 44. His farewell live show included Alex Lloyd performing a rewritten version of his song Amazing. For his final radio survey, Spencer was ranked second in the breakfast slot. He was replaced on ABC 702 by fellow Triple J alumni, Robbie Buck.

Spencer hosted the Smile High Club radio show programme on Qantas Airlines radio channel, Q, circa 2010.

=== Presentations and hosting ===
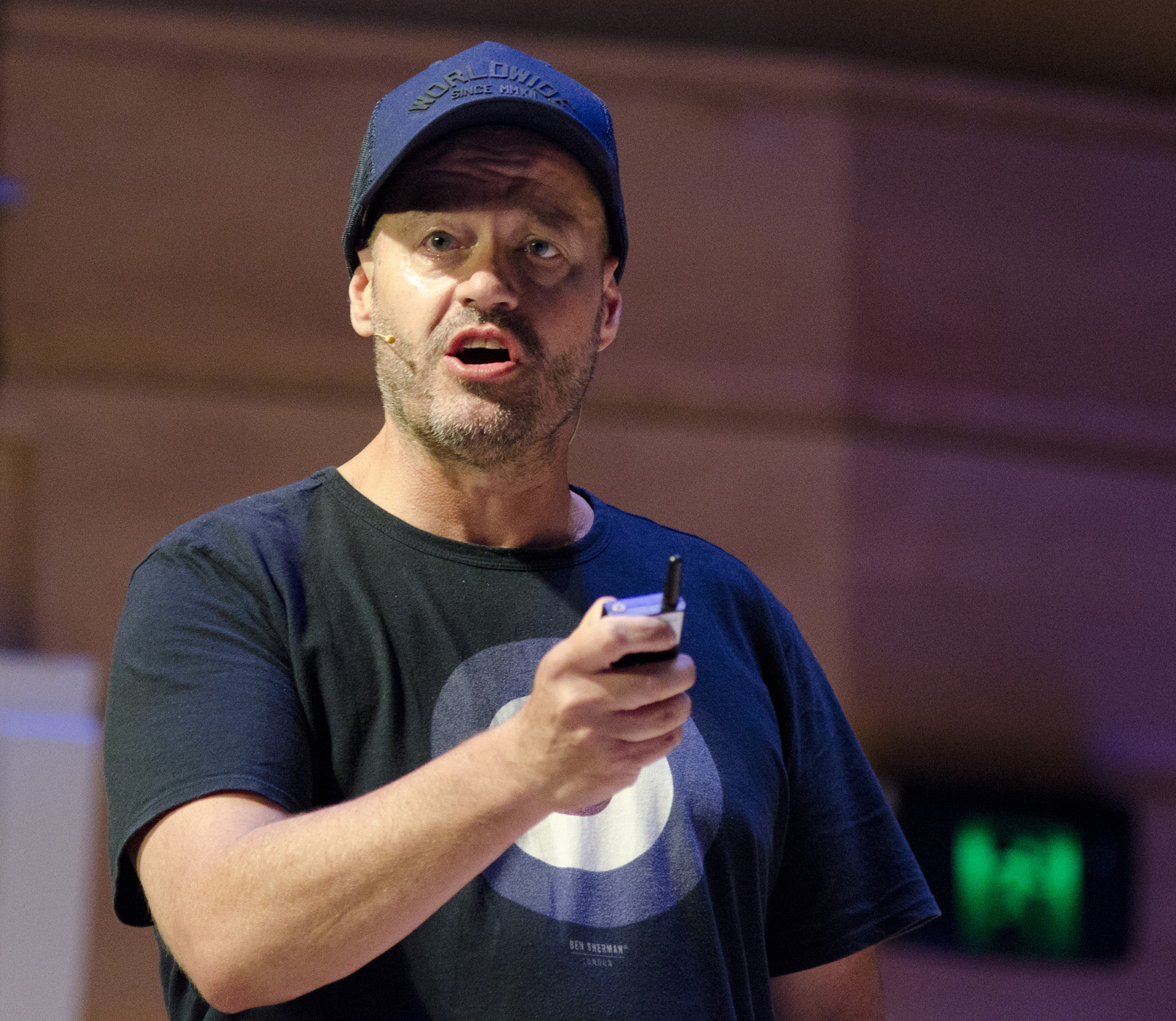
Adam Spencer, speaking at the Australian Skeptics National Convention 2017. Presentation title: The Number Games.

Spencer has hosted science-related events and held guest spots at a wide range of festivals and conferences, and has been described as "the Eddie McGuire of edgy cultural events."

Spencer was interviewed about issues affecting teens, for George Negus' New Dimensions' special screenings during Youth Week in 2003.

He went through Channel 7's Wheel of Fortune's formal audition process in April 2004. He then played on the show in June 2004. He became a carry-over champion and won a telescope.

For several years, Spencer has hosted both the Eureka awards and the Prime Minister's Prizes for Science award ceremonies. The Eureka awards have included a sponsored namesake award: the online Adam Spencer/University of Sydney Eureka Schools Prize for Lateral Thinking. The namesake award was issued in 2003 and 2004.

Spencer has presented televised coverage of Tropfest for a number of years, including 2006 and 2013.

He interviewed Breaking Bad scriptwriter Vince Gilligan during the Sydney Writers' Festival in 2014.

Year	Hosting and speaking roles
2002	He MCd the Air Guitar Championships at the Hobart Summer Festival in 2002.
2003	Spencer spoke at the Planning Institute of Australia's national congress on "Leading with diversity" in 2003, presented on the "Comedy of Maths" at the FPA annual convention in October 2003, was a guest speaker at the 15th annual Innovative Technology Schools Conference in 2003.
2004	Fronted a Sydney concert for World Environment Day in 2004.
2005	He MCd the Spirit of Youth Awards in 2005, and was guest speaker at the 2005 Country Public Libraries Association conference. Spencer and Dr Karl Kruszelnicki co-hosted "Class of a Million", a concurrent interactive science lesson for one million students, using Access Grid technology. It was held during the Australian Science Festival in August 2005.
2006	Hosted a forum on "Green is the New Black" for the City of Sydney in 2006, and hosted Travel Weekly's 2006 trivia night, Travel Pursuit.
2008	Hosted the 14th annual AIMIA Awards ceremony.
2009	Presented at The Big Skills Conference Sydney 2009.
2010	Hosted the 2010 Shonkies for Choice.
2011	Hosted the Publishers Australia Awards.
2014	Chaired a panel on "Smashing silos, building bridges..." at the Sydney Cancer Conference 2014, and facilitated sessions for the Engineers Australian Convention 2014.
2015	Facilitated a panel about algae for biofuels at the 5th Congress of the International Society for Applied Phycology, and hosted the 2015 Construction Skills Queensland Excellence Awards.
2017	Spencer was part of the Byron Bay Writers festival in August 2017, with events: A conversation with Lex Hirst, chairing the panel on Science, Philosophy and Ideas, and a panel member of Night of the Nerds. He hosted the Sneaks showcase at the Adobe Symposium (2017), opened the 2017 Grain Growers' annual Innovation Generation conference, and was a keynote speaker at the Australia Pharmacy Professional Conference and Trade Exhibition (APP2017).

=== Controversies and criticism ===
Date	Occurrence
1998	Spencer conducted an irreverent interview with Dr James "Dolly" Watson and received public criticism. Spencer interviewed Tim Freedman (lead singer of the Whitlams) about how a number of Australian bands agreed that Australia should get rid of the Liberal Government, and a linked "anti-coalition" concert called "Howard's End". Triple J was later required to publicly apologise for the concert's promotion. Ian Layne noted that many Triple J presenters, including Spencer, were post-youth, rather than appealing to the youth demographic.
1999	Spencer celebrated April Fool's Day by joking that Sydney might lose the 2000 Olympics, reporting that IOC officials were making a decision during a nine-hour meeting. The show included fake excerpts from a pretend Lausanne press conference in which an IOC representative, "Francois Curard" [sic] advised reporter "Carlton Roberts" of grave allegations against Sydney. Premier Bob Carr provided further commentary. The incident was further reported by Richard Wilkins on the Today show, resulting in an on-air apology from Steve Liebmann. Spencer bought flowers for the switchboard operators, to make up for the hundreds of phone calls about the jape.
2000	Spencer stated that Macy Gray was a boring interviewee, because of her on-air presence being that of a "professional recording person."
2001	Spencer hosted the Tropfest festival, which was disrupted by Peter Hore, who reached the stage area. Spencer ejected him and reminded him of his intrusion during Australia's qualifying match for the 1998 soccer World Cup, saying: "Thanks for losing us the World Cup, you prick," as he left the stage. In May 2001, Spencer was criticised in an opinion piece by Sara Phillips, and later on an email listserv, for his approach to science communication in marketing science as "sexy" rather than interesting on its own terms. Phillips summarised the ensuing debate in a July article, with editor Guy Nolch noting that Spencer and other science broadcasters, all appeal to different segments of the community. Spencer has denied that he's setting out to make science sexy. Other commentators have highlighted that reaching predisposed-to-science audiences through science communication with "geekification" outreach is an easy approach. Others state that "One-off extravaganzas by celebrity mathematicians such as Adam Spencer..." are not enough to make mathematics an attractive career path for students.
2002	A listener complained that the phrase "a blowjob in a toilet" was being used to promote Spencer and Anderson's breakfast program on Triple J.
2003	Spencer was at the ARIA Music Awards in October, presenting the award for Best Independent Release. He joked that the then-recently deceased Slim Dusty was the winner. The joke caused many in the audience to groan and spurred many complaints to radio and was denounced as being in poor taste. He later wrote an apology to Dusty's wife, Joy McKean, saying that he had wished to highlight Dusty's accomplishments, which she accepted. The actual winners were the folk rock band The Waifs. While hosting the Motorola Dance Music Awards in November, Spencer chastised Australian Idol judge Ian "Dicko" Dickson about his choice of outfit: "If you're gonna wear that shirt in public, then you'll have to lose some weight." The comment mirrored Dickson's criticism to contestant Paulini on Australian Idol.
2004	In November, during their co-hosted breakfast show, Wil Anderson joked about Mark Phillippoussis leaving Delta Goodrem for Paris Hilton. Anderson made derogatory remarks about Hilton, which were later found to be inappropriate, in a complaint upheld with the ABC.
2006	Soon after joining ABC 702, listeners gave feedback on the ABC Guestbook on his voice and that his rapid pace and speedy pronunciation of the word "Australian", made it sound like "strine". Similar feedback was noted in letters to the Sydney Morning Herald in 2011, regarding his tone of voice.
2007	Alex Mitchell noted that Walt Secord encouraged ministers to make policy announcements on Spencer's show as a method for disseminating political messages to ABC radio listeners.Media Watch criticised Australian Traffic Network's (ATN) association with the ABC when one of its reporters accidentally included a UBD advertisement in a report airing on Adam Spencer's show on ABC 702.
2008	An autocue glitch caused Spencer to read the incorrect award category at the AIMIA awards.
2010	Joe Hockey claimed that Spencer (as a fellow St Aloysius alumnus), had spread a rumour that Hockey was the legendary champion eater of bogong moths. This was mentioned in Parliament by Wayne Swan, who attributed the shadow Treasurer's erratic behaviour to an overconsumption of moths, as mentioned in Spencer's radio segment. While the topic had been raised on the program, the claim was raised by a listener identified as "Helen". Swan's statement of "I think we know why he [Hockey] is so erratic. He has been eating too many bogong moths." was awarded Quote of the Day by The Courier Mail.
2011	In June, questions were raised about Spencer's perceived promotion of the Australian Financial Review (AFR) on his radio segment. In July, Spencer interviewed climate change sceptic Christopher Monckton. The interview became heated as Spencer asked Monckton about his status as a member of the House of Lords, or if he was a Nobel Laureate, or academic credentials. Monckton told Spencer to "shut up and listen", and then Spencer hung up on him, and later called back to resume the discussion. Both Spencer and the producer later apologised to Monckton. The House of Lords later published an open letter, clarifying that Monckton is not a member of the Upper House. David Beamish (Clerk of the Parliaments) wrote the letter, clarifying that Monckton is a peer, which is a separate issue to House membership. Monckton challenged the letter during a presentation at the National Press Club.
2013	Former BBC journalist Andrea Wills conducted an audit of the ABC radio's federal election coverage. It was noted that it was unfortunate that Spencer wished Kevin Rudd "best of luck in the rest of the campaign" ahead of the election.

=== Publications ===
==== Books ====
Spencer has written several mathematical recreation books.

Title	Publication date	ISBN	Publisher	Notes
Adam Spencer's Book of Numbers	2000	ISBN 9781567317008 (1567317006, 0140287817)	Penguin	Also published in 2004 (New York: Four Walls Eight Windows, ISBN 1568582897). It has also been published as a German translation (2002). A book review by Art Johnson noted that it contains "rather strong language," rendering it inappropriate for students.
Laugh Even Louder!	2007	ISBN 978-1-74169-022-4	Scholastic Australia Pty Limited	As contributor.
Adam Spencer's Big Book of Numbers	2014	ISBN 9781921134333 (192113433X, 9781921134326)	Brio Books	It focuses on facts, mathematical equations and statistics for each number from one to 100. It sold 20,000 copies and finished at 105 on the bestseller charts.
Adam Spencer's World of Numbers	2015	ISBN 9781921134869 (1921134860)	Brio Books	Over 30,000 copies have been sold.
Adam Spencer's Enormous Book of Numbers	2015	ISBN 9781921134883	Brio Books	
Adam Spencer's Time Machine	2016	ISBN 9781925143188	Brio Books	
Adam Spencer's Number Crunchers	2016	ISBN 9781925143201	Brio Books	
Adam Spencer's The Number Games	2017	ISBN 9781925143881	Brio Books	
Adam Spencer's 12 Days of Christmas!	2017	ISBN 9781925143874	Brio Books	
Adam Spencer's Top 100	2018	ISBN 9781925589597	Brio Books	
Adam Spencer's The Number Detective	2018	ISBN 9781925589580	Brio Books	
Adam Spencer's Numberland	2019	ISBN 9781925589924	Brio Books	
Adam Spencer's Maths 101	2021	ISBN 9781743797617	Hardie Grant Books	

==== Articles ====
In August 2002, Spencer provided commentary in an ABC online article about the interpretation of the AKS algorithm.

==== Compilation CD trilogy ====
The ABC published a trilogy of compilation CDs of Adam Spencer's breakfast music. The CD series was issued under the Mytunes series name (distinct from the MyTunes program used to circumvent iTunes restrictions). They included Mytunes (2011), Mytunes 2 (2012) and Mytunes 3 (2013).

==== Interviews ====
===== Guest book chapters =====
Spencer was interviewed about how to have a safe and happy sex life, for Julie McCrossin's book, Love, Lust and Latex (2000).

He was interviewed for a chapter on prelabour in Lucy Perry's book, Cheers to childbirth: a dad's guide to childbirth support (2010)

===== Television episode =====
Spencer and producer Jo Chichester were interviewed for episode nine of ABC's television series Artzone in 1999.

== Personal life ==
Spencer was prompted to lose 25 kilograms in 2000, at the behest of his then-girlfriend.

He met his now ex-wife Melanie Mossman at a pub trivia night, telling her an answer in the quiz ("The actor is George Clooney and the film is Solaris.").

On the final day of his breakfast show in November 2004, he announced that his partner Melanie Mossman was pregnant and that the next year he would be leaving his media career to become a full-time dad. He returned within two years to present another breakfast radio show. He married Mel on 28 January 2006 in the Great Hall at Sydney University, where guests were asked to donate to charities in lieu of gifts. They have two daughters. When his oldest daughter was six months old, Spencer donated money for a fly to be named after her, Fijian fly A. Amblypsilopus elaquarae (Elaquare's Amblypsilopus). This was through the Australian Museum's project to seek funding by giving new animal species namesakes for a donation.

In 2014, thieves broke into Spencer's family home in Newtown, taking valuables including a laptop containing photos of his daughter. His car was also stolen, and was later found crashed into a power pole in Victoria Street, Marrickville. In 2015 Spencer, Mossman and their children moved to Copacabana, and listed the Newtown property for auction in August 2016.

In August 2017, Spencer confirmed he and Mossman had separated in early 2015 and been divorced for some time.

While Spencer attended St. Aloysius' College and was brought up a Catholic, he describes himself an atheist.

=== Cycling ===
Spencer has participated in cycling events in Sydney for charity. In March 2001, he led the cyclist portion of Oxfam Community Aid Abroad's Walk Against Want Victoria Park Fundraiser. He gave a presentation on the importance of planning for cyclists at the PIA 2003 National Congress. In November 2003, he took part in the cycling City to Surf, which fundraised for people in NSW with multiple sclerosis. In February 2004, he launched the new Central Sydney Bicycle map, which shares information on the easiest ways to cycle around Sydney. In May 2005, as part of the Greenhouse Advisory Panel, he advocated for car registration fees to link with engine size, to help people focus on their greenhouse impact and environmental footprint. He agrees with Danish urban planner's blueprint for a better Sydney, commenting in 2007 that pedestrian access should be improved in the heart of Sydney, including marked lanes for cyclists. He had made similar cycle lane commentary in April 2003 for an article about what he would institute if he were City of Sydney's Lord Mayor. For the first day of hosting breakfast for ABC 702, he cycled 4 kilometres to work for his 5:30am shift. He is often spotted around Sydney, pedalling or wearing his bike helmet and cycling clothes.

=== Football ===
Spencer took part in a celebrity game of football in June 2003, May 2004, and May 2005, to fundraise for the Malcolm Sargent Cancer Fund for Children (now Redkite).

==== Sydney Swans ====
In April 2006, he was master of ceremonies during a corporate function held before the Sydney Swans versus Geelong match. In March 2009, he MC'd a cocktail party for the Swans Foundation, which offers a scholarship scheme. In May 2012, he was master of ceremonies for the Swans Ladies Lunch.

In June 2012, to commemorate the Swans' 30 years in Sydney, he wrote for the Daily Telegraph about his ideal Swans team list.

In October 2015 he was named as the number one ticket holder for the Sydney Swans for the 2016 season.

In July 2017, as master of ceremonies, Spencer launched the Sydney Swans' Diversity Action Plan The plan is focused on disability empowerment, LGBTIQ pride, multicultural inclusion, and advancement of women.

=== Political views and activities ===
In 1992, Spencer spoke at the constitutional monarchists' attack on the Australian Republican Movement, at the university.

In the 1996 Blaxland by-election, while he was a student and part-time mathematics teacher at Sydney University, Spencer ran as an independent candidate. He was with the Anti-Super League Party (ASLeeP) or Australians Against Further Super League party, competing for former prime minister Paul Keating's seat of Blaxland. The party received 499 votes.

In November 2000, an article in the satirical Chaser newspaper alleged that Spencer refused to play a song by Little Johnny (pseudonym of Pauline Pantsdown), because of his "conservative leanings".

In 2014, Spencer spoke out against the government's proposed funding cuts to the ABC, and accused politicians of hiding loathing for the broadcaster behind arguments around inefficiencies.

In 2015, he was one of 61 Australians who signed an open letter urging prime minister Malcolm Turnbull to call a moratorium on new coal mines as part of a global climate change agreement.

=== Community, charity and advocacy work ===
==== Representative roles ====
Spencer is an ambassador for The Fred Hollows Foundation.

He is the national Patron for Dry July, having supported the cause ever since it began, prompted by a phone call to his breakfast radio show in 2007.

He is on the board of directors of Redkite (formerly The Malcolm Sargent Cancer Fund for kids).

==== General contributions ====
He coached the University of Sydney second grade women's football team. Since December 2001, he has been a Fellow of the University Senate. He had also served a term from 1992 to 1995. He is a member of the NSW Premier's Advisory Committee on Greenhouse and Global Warming and the NSW Health Department's Clinical Ethics Review Committee. He was part of the assessment panel for the NSW Medical Devices Fund in 2014.

In June 1999, he supported senator Natasha Stott Despoja's stand against the GST package, providing a poem to be read out at a function at Adelaide's Stag Hotel.

He sought corporate sponsorship to help the Australian Chess Team, issuing a national plea in 2002. The request was a success, and the team were able to attend the 35th Chess Olympiad in Bled, Slovenia, with financial help from condom maker Ansell.

Spencer took part in the Starlight Cup in October 2002 (sponsored by Hewlett-Packard) and December 2003 (sponsored by Qantas), wherein former tennis greats competing against celebrities.

In 2004, Spencer was on the judging panel for the Out of Sight – Tactile Art exhibition, run by Object Gallery and the Royal Blind Society.

He promoted pharmacy careers in an advertising campaign for the Pharmacy Guild of Australia in 2002, 2003 and 2004. The 2002 campaign was linked with the Rural and Remote Pharmacy Workforce Development Program. The 2003 campaign aimed to encourage young indigenous people to consider a career in pharmacy through the Aboriginal and Torres Strait Islander Undergraduate Pharmacy scholarships. The 2004 campaign aimed to attract young people from rural and regional centres to enrol in pharmacy university courses. He promoted the campaign in a television commercial in around 2006.

In August 2005, he hosted a corporate quiz fundraiser for Redkite in Brisbane.

In November 2005, he was one of the celebrity judges rating moustaches for the Movember Gala Party in Sydney. The campaign raised funds for the Prostate Cancer Foundation of Australia. He grew a moustache for Movember in 2006.

Spencer was part of the language expert panel for the Australian subsidiary developing the 2007 Microsoft Office System.

He was the Australia Day Ambassador in 2008.

In 2010, he featured in advertisements for the Prostate Cancer Foundation of Australia. The campaign focused on providing men with advice on prostate cancer and encouraged them to investigate testing options.

In 2010, Spencer signed up as one of the Ambassadors for White Ribbon, taking part in a swearing-in ceremony. In 2011, his show promoted the White Ribbon campaign against violence towards women. This contrasted with the coverage on 2Day FM of Kyle Sandilands lambasting the appearance of entertainment writer Alison Stephenson. Spencer told his radio audience that he regarded Sandilands' remarks as "heinous".

He hosted the Pink Stumps cricket day in support of the Jane McGrath Foundation in 2012. That same year, he was team captain of the Sydney Sailors in the Community Cup in Sydney, who won the match. The annual day raises funds for Reclink Australia.

In 2014, he participated in a video for Reach Out, focusing on combating stress during exams). He highlighted his change in studies (from law to mathematics), and eventual radio role, as examples of changing direction and life path.

Spencer was one of the celebrities credited with promoting the #SPCsunday hashtag on Twitter in 2014, which helped to increase exposure for struggling food processor SPC Ardmona.

===== Science, literacy and educational reforms =====
Spencer has advocated for better science literacy through educational reforms and improved resourcing for science teachers and laboratories in Australian primary schools. He has also urged high school students to do mathematics subjects to improve university outcomes and Australia's development. Spencer has highlighted the perceived failings of the Australian Tertiary Admissions Rank (ATAR), in terms of how subjects are weighted, and impact the final rankings for students. He has supported National Literacy and Numeracy Week by being a surprise visiting mathematics teacher. Lurnea High School was the winning school for his guest teaching spot in 2004.

In 2002, he was one of the suspects in the scientific whodunnit, "Who stole the Minister's malibu?", a forensic science program held across schools nationally.

In 2010 Spencer donated $10,000 worth of books through the Dymocks Literacy Foundation to encourage children from non-English speaking backgrounds to learn to read and write in English. The donation was for students at Blaxcell Street Public School (Granville), where he had been "Principal for a Day" in 2006.

In 2012, Spencer gave a book to each student at La Perouse Public School. This was to launch The Book Bank Project (partly funded by Spencer) and the National Year of Reading. In 2013, he was listed as an ambassador for The Book Bank program.

In 2013, he signed the "And in Science..." petition, which called for a science section during Australian television and radio news broadcasts. The campaign was organised by Rohan Kapitany, and gathered over 2300 signatures, but it was ultimately unsuccessful.

In 2016, he was a Numeracy Ambassador for National Literacy and Numeracy Week. He hosted a maths workshop at Gosford High School.

On the eve of the global March for Science (April 2017), Spencer, along with 44 other public figures and members of the scientific community, signed a letter in support of international scientific endeavour.

== Recognition ==
In 2012, Main-belt asteroid 18413 Adamspencer was named after him.

In 2012, he was ranked 49th in the Weekend Australian's list of "Top 50 most influential in higher education".

On 3 February 2018, Spencer was awarded an honorary Doctor of Science honoris causa award by Edith Cowan University.

=== Portraits ===
In 2002, photographer Lisa Giles included Spencer in a collection of 50 portraits in the exhibition Schools of Thought, focused on people associated with the University of Sydney. In the same year, artist Nafisa Naomi painted a portrait of Spencer, which featured in the exhibition A Lingering Doubt at the ArtHouse Hotel.

In 2005, National Library of Australia staff member Greg Power photographed Spencer at the fundraising Wave Aid: the tsunami relief concert. The image has been included in the National Library's collection.

In 2010, artist Melissa Beowulf entered her portrait of Spencer in the Portia Geach Memorial Award, which reached the finals. Spencer has commented on his "stern pose" in the painting.

In 2014, photographer David Stefanoff selected Spencer as one of a selection of famous faces projected onto trees and landscapes.
