= Dr. Karl =

Australian science communicator (born 1948)

Dr. Karl AM
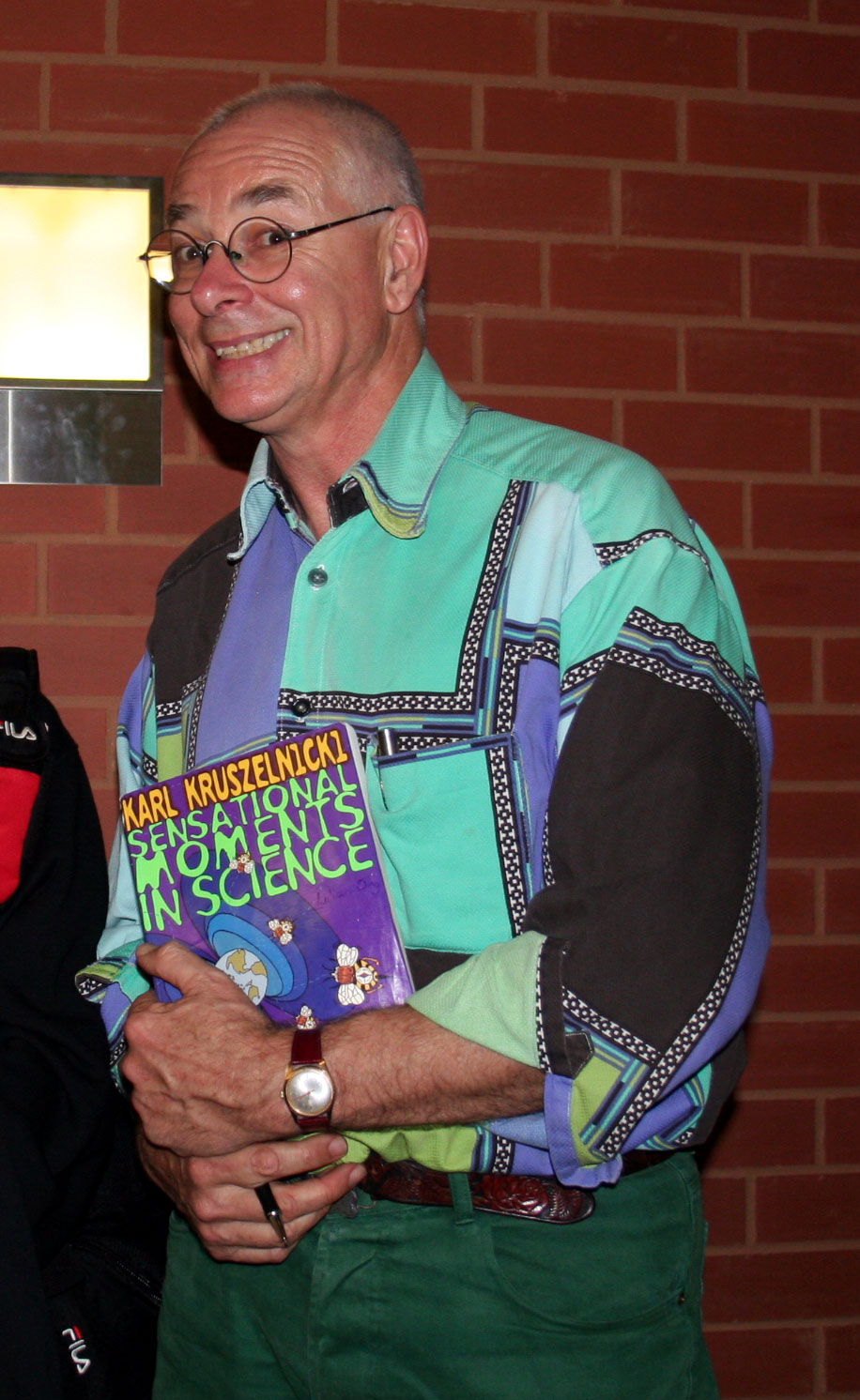
- Kruszelnicki in August 2006
- Born: Karl Sven Woytek Sas Konkovitch Matthew Kruszelnicki; 1948 (age 77–78); Helsingborg, Sweden
- Education: Edmund Rice College, West Wollongong
- Alma mater: University of Wollongong; University of New South Wales; University of Sydney
- Occupations: Science journalist, author and broadcaster
- Years active: 1981–present
- Employer: ABC
- Known for: Popular science
- Notable work: Great Moments in Science
- Television: Quantum; Sleek Geeks
- Title: The Julius Sumner Miller Fellow, Science Foundation for Physics, University of Sydney
- Term: 1994–present
- Parents: Ludwik Kruszelnicki (father); Rina née Szurek (mother)
- Awards: Member of the Order of Australia (2006); Ig Nobel Prize (2002); Australian Father of the Year (2003); Kalinga Award (2019)
- Website: drkarl.com Dr Karl on ABC.net.au

Karl Sven Woytek Sas Konkovitch Matthew Kruszelnicki AM (born 1948), often referred to as Dr. Karl, is an Australian science communicator and populariser, who is known for his appearances on radio, television, and podcasts.

Kruszelnicki is the Julius Sumner Miller Fellow in the Science Foundation for Physics at the School of Physics, University of Sydney.

== Early life ==
Kruszelnicki (Polish pronunciation: [kruʂɛlˈɲitskʲi]) was born in Helsingborg, Sweden, to Polish parents, Rina and Ludwik. Kruszelnicki's background was hidden from him for a long time, with his mother having told him that she was Swedish and a Lutheran but she was, in fact, Polish and Jewish. Both his parents were Holocaust survivors. His father Ludwik, a Polish Gentile, was turned in to the Gestapo for smuggling Jews out of Poland and was imprisoned at Sachsenhausen, a concentration camp used mainly for political prisoners. As the end of World War II approached, Ludwik avoided execution by swapping identities with a dead person. Rina escaped the Auschwitz concentration camp when the Nazis ran out of Zyklon B that was used to gas prisoners. They separately fled to Sweden, where they met, and where Karl was born.

When Kruszelnicki was two years old, his parents became concerned about the risk of Sweden being overrun by Russia and decided to flee the country. Before boarding a boat bound for America, Karl became ill with fever following a smallpox vaccination. Worried for his health, his parents decided not to board the boat. "Luck has it that the next ship went to Australia, so that is where we ended up. It is amazing how fate can take you in unexpected directions."

On arrival in Australia, the family were tenanted at the migrant camp in Bonegilla, Victoria. They remained there for three years before settling in the city of Wollongong, New South Wales. Kruszelnicki said his childhood as a refugee in Wollongong was difficult, and he was bullied at school; he said "anybody who was not an Irish Catholic was considered an outsider". He found an escape in the Wollongong Library, where he became interested in science fiction.

Kruszelnicki attended Edmund Rice Christian Brothers College in Wollongong, New South Wales. After high school, he attended the University of Wollongong, completing a Bachelor of Science degree majoring in physics in 1968. In 1980, Kruszelnicki was awarded a Master of Biomedical Engineering degree at the University of New South Wales. He completed his Bachelor of Medicine and Bachelor of Surgery degrees at Sydney University in 1986.

After high school, Kruszelnicki's first job was ditch digger in the Wollongong suburb of Dapto. He also worked as a filmmaker, car mechanic, TV weatherman and as roadie for Slim Dusty, Bo Diddley and Chuck Berry. While working as a taxi driver in Sydney, he was beaten unconscious after picking up a passenger trying to escape a group of men.

== Science career ==
After graduating from university at age 19, Kruszelnicki took a job as a physicist working for a steel works in his home town of Wollongong. He designed a machine to test the strength of steel made for use in Melbourne's West Gate Bridge, which was under construction at the time. After he was asked to fake the results of his tests, he resigned.

In the early 1980s, Kruszelnicki worked for ophthalmologist Fred Hollows. His Master of Biomedical Engineering degree allowed him to design and build a machine to pick up electrical signals off the human retina to diagnose certain eye diseases.

Kruszelnicki commenced his degree in medicine at the University of Sydney at the age of 32, graduating in 1986. From here he began work at a number of hospitals around Sydney, including the Children's Hospital in Camperdown. He talks fondly of his time as a children's doctor, though he left this profession after witnessing the first child die from whooping cough in twenty years. This came about, he says, after a television program tried to create controversy by presenting the efficacy of vaccinations with a false balance. This caused a drop in herd immunity, and eventually the death of this child. "That very strongly influenced me to go into the media, because I felt like I could do more good there (convincing people to vaccinate). And as a result, I gave up the best job of my life, which was being a doctor in a kids' hospital, so I could do more good in the community."

=== Television ===
Kruszelnicki presented the first series of Quantum (replaced by Catalyst) in 1985. As a science communicator and presenter, he appears on the Seven Network's Weekend Sunrise and on ABC TV. From early 2008 to 2010 he co-hosted a TV series called Sleek Geeks with Adam Spencer.

Kruszelnicki presented a program on ABC TV in January 2025 titled Dr Karl's How Things Work.

=== Journalism, radio and podcasts ===
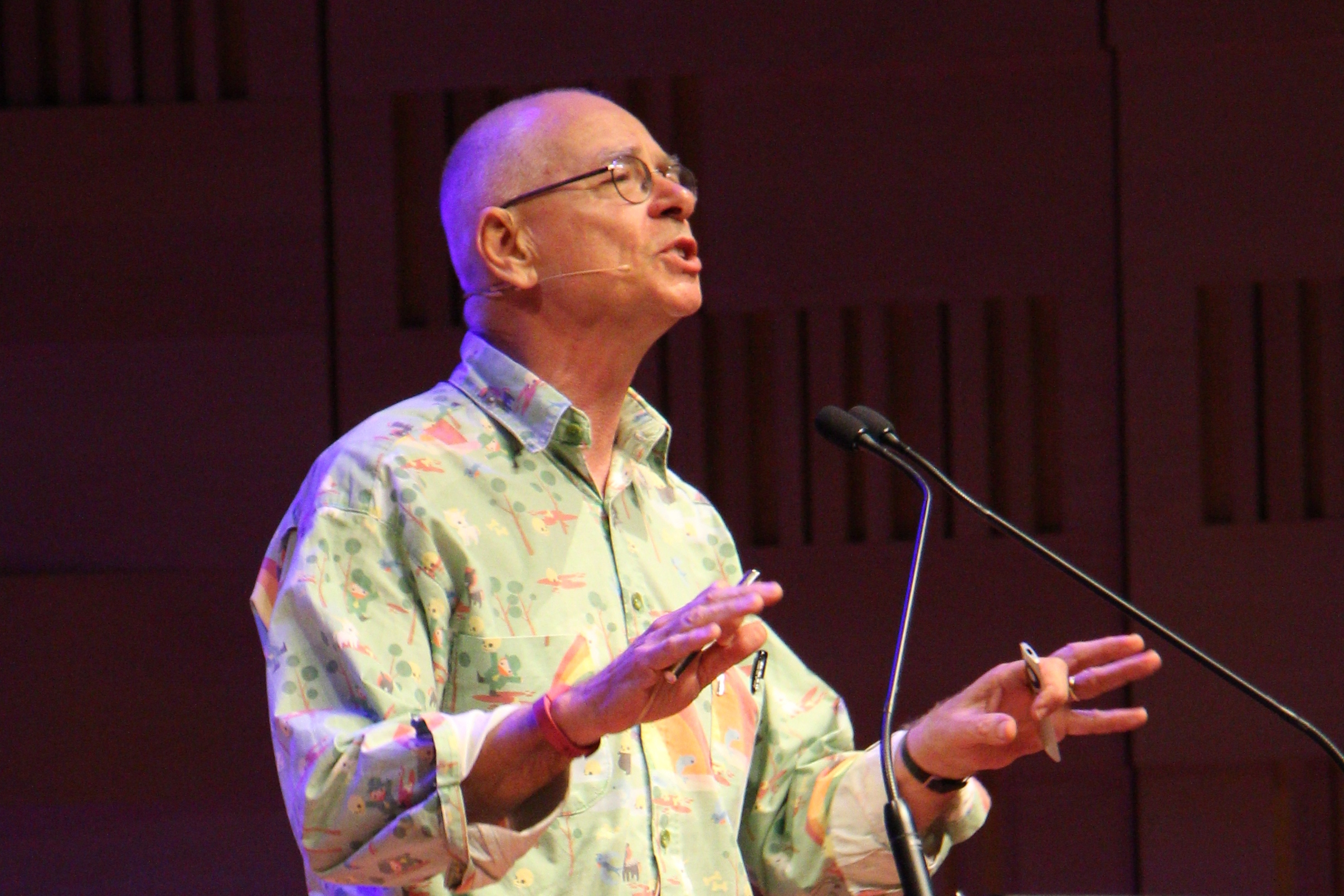
Australian Skeptics Convention held in Sydney, November 2014. Kruszelnicki speaking on "Great moments in science".

Kruszelnicki does a number of weekly radio shows and podcasts. His hour-long show on ABC radio station Triple J has been going on in one form or another since 1981; this weekly science talkback show, Science with Dr Karl, is broadcast on Thursday mornings from 11:00 am to midday and attracts up to 300,000 listeners; it is also available as a podcast.

Kruszelnicki also often helps with other science and education Triple J promotions such as the Sleek Geek Week roadshow with Adam Spencer and Caroline Pegram. He and Adam Spencer released the Sleek Geeks podcast regularly until December 2015. Also, Since 2016, he has hosted the podcast Shirtloads of Science.

For many years, until March 2020, Kruszelnicki appeared on a live weekly late-night link-up on BBC Radio 5 Live's Up All Night, usually with Rhod Sharp, answering science questions. In 2017, he hosted Dr. Karl's Outrageous Acts of Science on Discovery Channel (Australia).

Kruszelnicki writes a regular column for Australian Geographic magazine, called 'Need to Know', which is republished as a blog on the magazine's website. He has also written for the Sydney Morning Herald's Good Weekend magazine.

In 1981, he appeared on an Australian radio documentary about death and near-death experiences that aired on the ABC, And When I Die, Will I Be Dead? It was adapted into a book in 1987.

== Politics ==
Kruszelnicki was an unsuccessful candidate for the Australian Senate in the 2007 Australian federal election. He was placed number two on the Climate Change Coalition ticket in New South Wales.

In 2015, Kruszelnicki appeared in an Australian Government advertising campaign for the recently published intergenerational report. He had previously agreed to do the campaign, believing it would be a "non-political, bipartisan, independent report." After its publication, however, he backed away from the campaign, describing it as "flawed". "How can you possibly have a report that looks at the next 40 years and doesn't mention climate change? It should have acknowledged that climate change is real and we cause it and it will be messy."

== Personal life ==
Kruszelnicki met his wife Mary in his first year of medical school. They have three children together: Karl, Alice, and Lola.

Kruszelnicki has prosopagnosia, meaning he lacks the ability to recognise faces. To help him recognise colleagues, he has been known to carry a seating map of familiar office spaces. He puts the cause of his condition down to having an unhappy, lonely childhood, saying that it impeded the development of the part of his brain responsible for remembering faces.

== Recognition and awards ==
In 2000, the Australian Financial Review Internet Awards awarded Kruszelnicki the Best Science and Technology Website.

In the 2001 honours list, he was awarded the Centenary Medal "for major service in raising public awareness of the importance of science and technology".

One of Kruszelnicki's more notable undertakings was his part in a research project on belly button fluff, for which he received the tongue-in-cheek Ig Nobel Prize in 2002.

He received the Australian Father of the Year award in 2003.

In the 2006 honours list, he was made a Member of the Order of Australia.

In 2006, the Australian Skeptics recognised him as the Australian Skeptic Of The Year.

In 2012, Kruszelnicki was named as a National Living Treasure by the National Trust of Australia (NSW).

In 2012, Main-belt asteroid 18412 Kruszelnicki was named in his honour.

In 2014, Reader's Digest readers voted Kruszelnicki as the ninth-most-trusted person in Australia

In 2016, he received an honorary doctorate from the University of the Sunshine Coast.

Kruszelnicki won UNESCO's 2019 Kalinga Prize for science communication.

In 2024, Dr Karl was awarded an Honorary Doctorate of Science from the University of Newcastle for being an advocate for science, education, and health.

Also 2024, he won TikTok High-Quality Content Creator of the Year Award

He received the 2025 NSW Senior Australian of the Year for inspiring millions with his science storytelling, tackling misinformation and making complex ideas accessible.

In 2025, he was awarded a Bellagio Center Residency in Italy from The Rockefeller Foundation to develop a strategy using Artificial Intelligence to counter climate change disinformation.

Also in 2025, A Periodic Tale: My Sciencey Memoir was shortlisted for the Australian Book Industry Awards for Biography of the Year.

He was elected a Fellow of the Australian Academy of Technological Sciences & Engineering in 2026.

== Selected publications ==
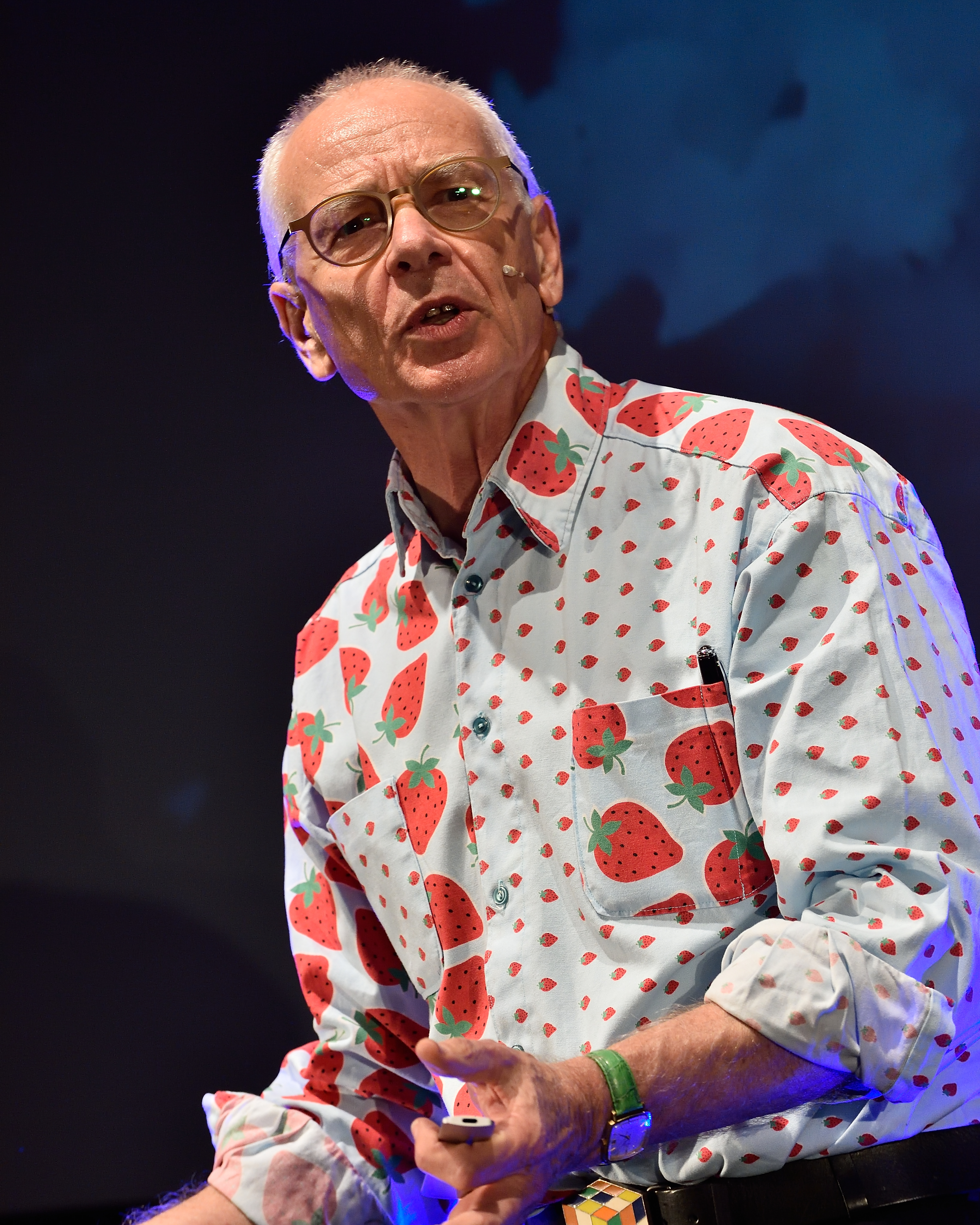
Dr Karl lecturing at QED 2016.

Books

- Kruszelnicki, Karl (1986). Science Bizarre. Illustrated by Judy Calman and David Art Wales. Sydney: Australian Broadcasting Corporation. ISBN 0-642-52740-7.
- Kruszelnicki, Karl (1991). Latest great moments in science. Illustrated by Kerrie Lester. Sydney: Australian Broadcasting Corporation. ISBN 0-7333-0144-4.
- Spacescape, Harcourt Brace Jovanovich, (Australia), 1992, ISBN 0-7295-1100-6.
- Absolutely Fabulous Moments in Science, Australian Broadcasting Corporation Enterprises, Sydney, Australia, 1994, ISBN 0-7333-0407-9.
- Sensational Moments in Science, Australian Broadcasting Corporation Enterprises, Sydney, Australia, 1995, ISBN 0-7333-0456-7.
- Pigeon Poo the Universe & Car Paint – and other awesome science moments, HarperCollins Publishers Pty Ltd, Australia, 1996, ISBN 0-7322-5723-9.
- Flying Lasers, Robofish and Cities of Slime – and other brain-bending science moments, HarperCollins Publishers Pty Ltd, Australia, 1997, ISBN 0-7322-5874-X.
- Munching Maggots, Noah's Flood and TV Heart Attacks and other cataclysmic science moments, HarperCollins Publishers Pty Ltd, Australia, 1998, ISBN 0-7322-5858-8.
- Fidgeting Fat, Exploding Meat & Gobbling Whirly Birds – and other delicious science moments - New Moments in science 4, 1999.
- Q&A With Dr. K – Why It Is So. Headless Chickens, Bathroom Queues and Belly Button Blues, HarperCollins Publishers Pty Ltd, Australia, 2001, ISBN 0-7322-5855-3.
- Dr Karl's Collection of Great Australian Facts & Firsts, HarperCollins Publishers Pty Ltd, Australia, 2002, ISBN 0-207-19860-8.
- Bumbreath, Botox and Bubbles and other Fully Sick Science Moments, HarperCollins Publishers Pty Ltd, Australia, 2003, ISBN 0-7322-6715-3.
- Great Mythconceptions – Cellulite, Camel Humps and Chocolate Zits, HarperCollins Publishers Pty Ltd, Australia, 2004, ISBN 0-7322-8062-1.
- Dis Information and Other Wikkid Myths: More Great Myths In Science, HarperCollins Publishers Pty Ltd, Australia, 2005, ISBN 0-7322-8060-5.
- It Ain't Necessarily So Bro, HarperCollins Publishers Pty Ltd, Australia, 2006, ISBN 0-7322-8061-3.
- Please Explain, HarperCollins Publishers Pty Ltd, Australia, 2007, ISBN 0-7322-8535-6.
- Science Is Golden, HarperCollins Publishers Pty Ltd, Australia 2008 ISBN 978-0-732-28536-4
- Never Mind the Bullocks, Here's the Science, HarperCollins Publishers Pty Ltd, Australia, 2009, ISBN 0-7322-8537-2.
- Dinosaurs Aren't Dead, Pan Macmillan Pty Limited, Australia, 2010 ISBN 978-0-330-42579-7
- Curious and Curiouser, Pan Macmillan Pty Limited, Australia, 2010 ISBN 978-1-742-61170-9
- Brain Food, Pan Macmillan Pty Limited, Australia, 2011 ISBN 978-1-742-61039-9
- 50 Shades of Grey Matter, Pan Macmillan Pty Limited, Australia, 2012 ISBN 978-1-742-61138-9
- Game of Knowns, Pan Macmillan Pty Limited, Australia, 2013 ISBN 978-1-742-61334-5
- Dr Karl's Big Book of Science Stuff and Nonsense, Pan Macmillan Pty Limited, Australia, 2013 ISBN 978-1-742-61368-0
- House of Karls, Pan Macmillan Pty Limited, Australia, 2014 ISBN 978-1-743-51951-6
- Dr Karl's Short Back & Science, Pan Macmillan Pty Limited, Australia, 2015 ISBN 978-1-743-53334-5
- The Doctor, Pan Macmillan Pty Limited, Australia, 2016 ISBN 978-1-743-54742-7
- Karl, The Universe and Everything, Pan Macmillan Pty Limited, Australia, 2017 ISBN 978-1-925-48132-7
- Vital Science, Pan Macmillan Australia Pty Limited, Australia, 2018 ISBN 978-1-760-78122-4
- Dr Karl's Random Road Trip Through Science, HarperCollins Publishers Australia Pty Limited, Australia, 2019 ISBN 978-0-7333-4032-1
- Dr Karl's Surfing Safari Through Science, HarperCollins Publishers Australia Pty Limited, Australia, 2020 ISBN 978-0-7333-4033-8
- Dr Karl's Little Book of Climate Change Science, HarperCollins Publishers Australia Pty Limited, Australia, 2021 ISBN 978-0-7333-4129-8
- "A Periodic Tale: My Sciencey Memoir", HarperCollins Publishers Australia Pty Limited, Australia, 2024 ISBN 978-0-7333-4034-5

Journal articles

- Kruszelnicki, Karl (May–June 2014). "Cervical cancer vaccine". Your AG. Inventions. Australian Geographic. 120: 124. Archived from the original on 9 February 2018.

== See also ==
- Adam Spencer
- List of Ig Nobel Prize winners
