= Investigating Lake Iluka =

1993 video game

- Developer: Interactive Multimedia Learning Laboratory
- Publisher: Interactive Multimedia Pty Ltd
- Platforms: Windows, Macintosh
- Release: 1993
- Genre: Educational
- Mode: Single-player

Investigating Lake Iluka is a 1993 educational video game developed by the Interactive Multimedia Learning Laboratory and published by Interactive Multimedia Pty Ltd. It was released alongside Exploring the Nardoo. The game is a simulation of a lake ecosystem developed by University of Wollongong researchers as an educational tool for science students.

== Gameplay ==
Investigating Lake Iluka tasks players to explore the ecosystem of a fictitious lake, Lake Iluka, and collect scientific data, including physical conditions, the biological composition of the water systems, and surrounding habitats. Players investigate four environments, including an estuary, mangrove, open lake and urban runoff. The game features a notebook that allows the user to write text, copy and paste text from other areas of the program, and save the text as a text file.

== Development ==
Investigating Lake Iluka and Exploring the Nardoo were developed by the Interactive Multimedia Learning Laboratory, a team at the University of Wollongong designed for Australian schools. Development of the game was led by Professors Barry Harper and John Hedberg, the latter an associate professor of information technology and Associate Dean of the Graduate School of Education at the university. The developer's objectives for the software were to allow science students to practice their skills through immersion and problem-solving in an authentic and complex simulation of an ecosystem. The ecosystem of Lake Iluka was designed to simulate "biological, chemical and physical components" of a real lake.

== Reception ==
Investigating Lake Iluka was positively described by science educators as representative of an emerging trend in the 1990s of open-ended educational simulations using inquiry-based learning and contextual learning. George Boone of The American Biology Teacher recommended the game for secondary science educators, writing that the software was comprehensive, finding them easy to operate and teach, and praising their supporting information and data. Milton Brown of Scan considered the game was an "excellent and useful resource" that provided an extensive scope to investigate environmental issues. Debi Crawford of The Science Teacher also recommended the software, considering it useful for longer-term lessons for middle school students, and felt it had "many possibilities for expanding the lesson beyond the scope of the computer simulation", although noted it required a high-end computer to run.

=== Accolades ===
In 1994, Investigating Lake Iluka received the Australian Multimedia Award by the Australian Teachers of Media, Best Educational Software by the Australian Interactive Media Industry Association and the Most Innovative Product in the Computer Software Category and Premier Award by the Australian Society for Educational Technology.
