= Sleek Geeks =

- Presented by: Karl Kruszelnicki; Adam Spencer
- Country of origin: Australia
- Original language: English
- No. of seasons: 2
- No. of episodes: 14

Original release
- Network: ABC1
- Release: 3 January 2008 – 30 December 2010

Sleek Geeks is an Australian science television series, hosted by Dr Karl Kruszelnicki and Adam Spencer. The fourteen-part series aired from 3 January 2008, and was based on Kruszelnicki and Spencer's Sleek Geek Week travelling roadshow, as well as Kruszelnicki's Great Moments in Science broadcasts on Triple J radio. The show was co-hosted by fellow "geeks" Yumi Stynes, Ruben Meerman and Dr Stephen Bosi.

The program aimed to demonstrate scientific principles and debunk common myths and fallacies, although Kruszelnicki and Spencer were disparaging of similar programs such as Discovery Channel's MythBusters (which Spencer called "constructively anti-scientific") and Sky One's Brainiac: Science Abuse (which according to Kruszelnicki was "embarrassing... women jumping on trampolines").

Sleek Geeks was one of the first batch of television programs offered for sale in Australia on the iTunes Store.

Sleek Geeks Season 2 aired from 11 November until 30 December 2010, on ABC1 on a Thursday night at 8.00 pm.

== Episodes ==
=== Series 1 ===
==== Episode 1: Senses ====
The first episode examines the senses of the human body: Adam tries his feet at firewalking, the audience consumes some hot chillis, Karl attempts to break glass with singing, and the story of Mike the Headless Chicken is shown.

==== Episode 2: Mind Games ====
The second episode covers matters of the mind: Adam subjects himself to hypnosis, Karl explains why we experience déjà vu, and the mind's filtered perception is demonstrated when nobody notices a man in a gorilla suit in the audience.

==== Episode 3: Boys & Girls ====
The third episode looks at the differences between men and women, starting with the X chromosome, autoimmunity in women, fetal mouth movement, how finger length can indicate sperm count, and some facts about nose picking.

==== Episode 4: Time ====
The fourth episode covers time: the Big Bang, the theory of relativity, the Libet experiment, and how daylight saving contributes to a higher accident rate.

==== Episode 5: Forces ====
Adam and Karl experience zero gravity with the Roulettes aerobatic team, discuss faster-than-light movement, look at the development of nuclear weapons, and find out who the "Murphy" who supposedly coined Murphy's law was.

==== Episode 6: Water ====
The final episode covers water: Adam and Karl find out the best way to escape from a rip current, and to keep beer cool at a party. The audience sampled reclaimed water, recycled from Adam's urine and bathwater.
