= Red kite (disambiguation) =

Red kite or Redkite may refer to:

- Red kite (Milvus milvus), a medium-large bird of prey
- Redkite, airborne wide-area motion imagery sensor
- Red Kite Animation, British animation production
- Red Kite (band), Norwegian prog-jazz band
- Redkite (organisation), charity organisation in Australia
- Red Kite (Sarah Cracknell album)
