= Ann Jones (Australian journalist) =

Australian journalist and presenter

- Born: 1983 (age 42–43); Victoria, Australia
- Education: Australian National University, Canberra
- Occupations: Journalist, radio & TV presenter
- Years active: 2014 – present
- Organization: Australian Broadcasting Corporation
- Known for: Presenting nature programmes

Ann Jones (born 1983), also referred to as Dr Ann, is an Australian environmental journalist, who is a radio and television presenter for the Australian Broadcasting Corporation (ABC).

She is best known for presenting ABC Science programmes, like the podcast series What the Duck?!, some episodes of Catalyst, and the Radio National show, Off Track.

== Personal life and education ==
Ann Jones was born in 1983 as the youngest of three children, having two older brothers, and grew up in Scotsburn, rural Victoria on a hobby farm. Her mother, a teacher who returned to university to become a nurse, was the sole parent of the family until she married when Jones was 11-years old. Jones' stepfather, hailing from Daylesford, is an enthusiast of nature, inspiring Jones to a large extent.

As a child, Jones attended Scotsburn Primary School, before going to Chile for her final year of high school in the O'Higgins Region. She went to various tertiary institutions, including the University of Queensland in Brisbane, and the Western Australian Academy of Performing Arts in Perth, earning a PhD in History at the Australian National University (ANU) in Canberra. ANU Press published her book, No Truck with the Chilean Junta! on the Pinochet reign in August 2014, her specialist academic subject being trade union internationalism and the labour movement, primarily in-relation to Latin America.

She resides in Sydney, New South Wales, and has two pets, a Maine Coon cat named Bubbles, and a freshwater prawn named Prawn Connery.

== Career ==
Ann Jones began her broadcasting career as a local radio presenter for the ABC in Port Pirie, South Australia, and later in regional Victoria. Since 2014 she presented the Radio National programme Off Track, often recording, producing, and editing for the show as well, one of the 2016 episodes, Flying for their lives was a co-production with the BBC World Service, tracking the migration of Australian shorebirds through China to Alaska, Off Track concluded in 2022. A similar series, Nature Track, also presented by Jones, began in 2021. She briefly hosted the long-form podcast interview series Conversations in the absence of Richard Fidler from late November to early December 2016. Jones began hosting Noisy by Nature, an ABC Kids podcast in 2019.

In 2019 Jones debuted on television when she presented "Kill or Cure? The Story of Venom" as part of ABC's flagship science show, Catalyst. She also presented part of Reef Live. In 2022 she began the ABC Listen podcast, What the Duck?! for which she was nominated for Moment of Factual Clarity by the International Women's Podcast Awards in 2024 as well as a spin-off series Sex is Weird, presented Southern Ocean Live, and the television special Meet the Penguins. She has also worked on and presented several episodes of the ABC's long-running science programme, Catalyst as well as presenting several of the series' spin-offs, such as the two-part series co-presented with Paul West Australia's Favourite Tree in 2022, The Secret Lives of Our Urban Birds, The Soundtrack of Australia and Project Wild in 2023, and the 6-part series Dr Ann's Secret Lives, first airing from 15 July to 19 August in 2025. Jones also presents the ABC Science YouTube series, How Deadly, its spin-off How Deadly: World, and How Extra.
