= Aimia =

Aimia may refer to:

- Aimia Inc., a Canadian global investment holding company, initially a loyalty solutions provider
- Australian Interactive Media Industry Association
