= Oxfam Australia =

Australian charitable organization

- Named after: Oxford Committee for Famine Relief
- Type: International NGO
- Purpose: To end poverty, Oxfam disrupts inequality by partnering with communities to create a just, safe and thriving world.
- Region served: Worldwide
- CEO: Jennifer Tierney
- Website: www.oxfam.org.au

Oxfam Australia is an Australian, independent, charity, not-for-profit, secular, community-based aid and development organization, and is an affiliate of the Oxfam International Confederation. Oxfam Australia's work is divided into four broad categories covering climate justice, Economic Justice, Gender Justice and First Peoples Justice as well as Humanitarian response. They believe that poverty in the 21st century is less a problem of scarcity but the result of how resources, opportunities, and protections are distributed and wielded.

Oxfam Australia advocates for long-term inclusive development projects, responding to emergencies, and campaigning to improve the lives of people living with poverty around the world. They aim to give disadvantaged people improved access to social services, an effective voice in decisions, equal rights and status, and safety and security from conflict and disaster.

Oxfam Australia's activities are mainly funded by community support income. In 2020-2021 Oxfam Australia’s development and advocacy programs use 73% of donated funds, 19% is used for fundraising and promotion, and the remaining 8% for administration costs. In the case of emergency appeals, 85% of funds are used directly for emergency response purposes.

In 2020-2021 the global Oxfam Confederation delivered life-saving aid, advocacy support and transformational development programs to 25.7 million people around the world.

== History ==
Oxfam Australia can be traced back to the work of Father Gerard Kennedy Tucker in the 1950s, who was concerned about poverty in Asia following the Second World War. The first local group was established in Hawthorn, a suburb of Melbourne, in 1953, as the Food for Peace Campaign. Local groups were established in Perth and Sydney, and in 1962 the name was changed to Community Aid Abroad to reflect an emphasis on developing whole communities more broadly than just providing food for peace it is working on making a big company.

In 1965, Community Aid Abroad established Trade Action to provide trade opportunities between Australia and developing countries by selling handicrafts. From 1965 to 1976 Trade Action ran profitably and subsidised the organisation's operating costs, but its performance declined and it was sold in 1979. Local groups continued to trade with project partners, and in 1986 these efforts were combined to form CAA Trading, which by 2005 incorporated 17 shops Australia wide and mail order and wholesale operations in Adelaide. These ventures form the basis of the Oxfam Shop which has been expanding in recent years, selling fairtrade goods.

Community Aid Abroad has always been a supporter of efforts in indigenous Australia to reduce poverty and support projects there. Also in the 1970s support expanded to the Pacific, in particular for anti-nuclear causes. In the mid-1980s Mexico and South America came under the umbrella.

In 1983, Community Aid Development Centres were started. This had more of a commercial focus, and is based on the principles of capacity building. It ran independently of the main Community Aid Abroad and is now called IDSS. In 1991 Community Aid Abroad merged with Australian Freedom From Hunger Campaign, becoming one of the largest Australian development organisations. In 1995 it took the name "Oxfam Community Aid Abroad" to reflect its affiliation with Oxfam International. In 2005 this was changed to Oxfam Australia.

== Emergency response ==
A large part of Oxfam Australia's work involves direct response to humanitarian emergencies. Oxfam Australia works with its partners within disaster struck areas to provide humanitarian aid such as water and sanitation. It also advocates for the observance of human rights in times of disaster and conflict, for instance, upholding the Geneva Convention. Once the immediate dangers of an emergency have passes, Oxfam continues to work in the communities to ensure recovery it is good.

Oxfam Australia had a major role in responding to the 2004 Indian Ocean tsunami. Funds to the amount of A$27,777,000 were raised from the Australian public and business community, which was spent over four years up until the end of 2008. Response programs operated by Oxfam Australia included providing shelter to people who lost their homes, as well as small loans to help people setup small businesses. Oxfam Australia tsunami response saw it working in the following countries: Indonesia, Sri Lanka, India, Thailand, Somalia, Maldives and Myanmar.

Oxfam Australia is a partner in the operation of the Joint Emergency Stores Warehouse, opened in Brisbane in October 2008. The facility contains 100 tonnes of humanitarian supplies for use in the Asia-Pacific region.

Oxfam Australia have responded in recent times to major humanitarian emergencies such as the Yemeni Civil War (2014–present), 2015 Cyclone Pam, 2015 Nepal earthquake and 2018 Sulawesi earthquake and tsunami.

== Programs ==
Oxfam Australia supports self-help development projects in 30 countries. These countries can be divided into five regions.

=== First Peoples Program ===
For more than 40 years, Oxfam Australia has worked with Aboriginal and Torres Strait Islander peoples to advance their rights. Oxfam Australia works with a range of partners across the areas of land rights, climate justice, justice reinvestment and holds the biannual flagship political program Straight Talk, which brings Aboriginal and Torres Strait Islander women to Canberra to meet politicians, learn about Australia’s political system, and leverage/wield/use those learnings to make change happen in their communities.

=== The Pacific ===
Oxfam Australia has worked in the Pacific region since the 1960s, supporting projects in areas such as primary education, youth community theatre, independent media, human rights training and business skills for women.

The countries in which Oxfam Australia are currently working are Fiji, Papua New Guinea, Solomon Islands and Vanuatu.

=== Southern Africa ===
In Southern Africa, Oxfam Australia is working in the following countries: Malawi, Mozambique, South Africa, Sudan, and Zimbabwe. Areas of work include: providing clean water, emergency relief, ensuring communities have sufficient food, conflict reconciliation, gender issues, preventing HIV and AIDS, and debt forgiveness.

=== East Asia ===
In East Asia, Oxfam Australia currently works in seven countries, Cambodia, China, Indonesia, Laos, Philippines, Timor-Leste, and Vietnam.

=== South Asia ===
In this region, Oxfam Australia has programs operating in India, Sri Lanka and Bangladesh.

== Campaigning ==
Oxfam Australia is involved in a wide range of advocacy campaigns:

=== Close the Gap ===
This is an ongoing campaign to raise awareness of disadvantages of Indigenous Australians. Particularly, Oxfam Australia has publicised the life expectancy gap of Indigenous Australians, who on average die almost 20 years earlier than non-Indigenous Australians.

=== Labour rights ===
Oxfam Australia is working together with other international organisations to persuade sportswear companies to respect and implement workers’s rights. Oxfam Australia supports unions and organisations in Asia to campaign for labour rights in factories, workplaces, and to lobby governments and companies to ensure the rights of workers making sportswear products are upheld. The vast majority of workers who make sports gear are young women who have migrated from rural to urban areas in their own country, to earn money to support themselves and their families. Oxfam Australia also seeks to promote solutions by researching labour rights issues and making recommendations to major brands. Oxfam Australia’s campaign focuses on several of the largest sports brands (including adidas and Nike) who collectively, through their suppliers, employ hundreds of thousands of workers throughout Asia. Major campaign issues include the need for sportswear companies to respect the right of workers to form and join unions (known as freedom of association) and the right to collective bargaining, ensure the payment of living wages, an end to workplace harassment and discrimination, and an end to unsafe or exploitative working conditions (often referred to as “sweatshops”).

=== Mining, oil and gas ===
Oxfam Australia actively lobbies Australian mining companies and governments for them to adhere to policies and practices that support the rights of disadvantaged people who might be adversely affected by mining activities. Through its Mining Ombudsman process, Oxfam Australia works to defend against human rights abuses and environmental destruction by Mining companies.

Oxfam Australia supports Publish What You Pay a campaign that lobbies mining companies to disclose monies paid to foreign governments in order to secure mining rights. Oxfam Australia believes these payments can lead to increased corruption in developing countries.

Oxfam Australia put pressure on Melbourne-based miner, OceanaGold, over its Didipio gold-copper project in the Philippines. Oxfam Australia called for an Australian Federal Police investigation in 2007 after uncovering reports of bribery and human rights abuses. OceanaGold subsequently halted the project in October 2008, citing poor economic conditions.

=== Climate change ===
Oxfam Australia believes that poor communities in developing countries will be the ones worst affected by climate change and the least able to adapt. For this reason, Oxfam Australia advocates that developed countries cut carbon emissions and provide support for people in developing countries.

=== Development banks ===
Oxfam Australia questions the activities of development banks such as the International Monetary Fund (IMF) and particularly the Asian Development Bank (ADB). Oxfam Australia makes the point that the programs funded by these large organisations through loans to the governments of developing countries, may not always be assistive to the public good of those countries.

== Oxfam Shops ==
Oxfam Australia supported fair trade through its chain of Oxfam Shops. Oxfam Shop was a registered Fair Trade Organisation by the International Fair Trade Association. Oxfam Shop was a wholly owned subsidiary of Oxfam Australia and operated as a non profit. It worked to provide a market for food and hand crafts produced in third world countries. It had over 100,000 producer partners around the world, including Indigenous Australians. Oxfam Shops supplied up to 50% advance payment for the goods it bought and provided support for product and skills development. The final 13 Oxfam Shops were closed in 2019 and Oxfam now distributes its Fair range of coffee through existing retailers in Australia.

== Events ==
Oxfam Australia's biggest event was Trailwalker, which took place annually in Sydney, Melbourne, Perth and Brisbane. In 2024 over 700 teams of four took part in the very last Oxfam Trailwalker Melbourne. Each team was required to cover 100 km in 48 hours, or 50km in 24 hours.

Oxfam Trailwalker originated in Hong Kong in 1981 as a military training exercise for the Queens Gurkha Signals Regiment. In 1986, Oxfam Hong Kong was invited to co-organise the event and then in 1997, completely took it over. Over time, Oxfam Trailwalker became one of the largest fundraising sports events in Hong Kong and has had massive success annually in the UK, New Zealand, Australia, Japan, and Belgium.

Trailwalker is separate to the Walk Against Want, which was first held in 1967 as a 45 km walk from Melbourne to Frankston. The Walk Against Want was a major Australian fundraising event in subsequent decades. Today community groups around Australia hold several Walk Against Wants throughout the year.

== Criticism ==
In April 2007, two Melbourne based academics lodged formal complaints with the Australian Competition and Consumer Commission to investigate Oxfam, alleging that Oxfam Australia was guilty of misleading or deceptive conduct under the Trade Practices Act, over the sale of Fairtrade coffee. They believed that Fairtrade coffee should not be promoted as helping to lift Third World producers out of poverty because growers are paid very little for their beans.

Oxfam’s activism has been criticized for being misguided and ill-informed over a number of years. For example, the organization’s stance on intellectual property was said by Tim Wilson, then a policy director from the Institute of Public Affairs, to be "far too quick to blame the HIV/AIDS crisis in the developing world on patents and intellectual property regimes. But their concern does not match the facts - patents are not the major barriers preventing access to vital medicines" and that the organization "may need to decide how serious they are about fixing this problem, and perhaps consider a reconciliation with private enterprise." In 2008 a report criticized Oxfam’s funding and Aid projects stating that it was "fundamentally misguided" and that "Oxfam is wrong on the economics of multilateral trade negotiations."

== See also ==
- Helen Szoke, former Chief Executive, Oxfam Australia.
- Walk Against Want
- Trailwalker
- AusAID
- J. B. Webb, Director, Community Aid Abroad, 1970-1975.
- Brian Hobbs, National Chairperson, Community Aid Abroad, 1985-1991.
