= Australian Freedom from Hunger Campaign =

Charity

Australian Freedom from Hunger Campaign (AFFHC) was a charity in Australia aimed at raising awareness about poverty and hunger in Australia. Founded in 1961, it merged with Community Aid Abroad in 1992 (now known as Oxfam Australia).

== History ==
The first AFFHC meeting was held following the launch in 1960 of the United Nations Food and Agriculture Organization's five-year campaign, Freedom from Hunger. (Note: Freedom from Hunger was intended as a community campaign aimed at raising global awareness of the issues of poverty around the world as well as providing opportunities for communities in developed countries to directly support anti-poverty programs in the developing world.)

AFFHC membership was initially open to organisations rather than individuals, and these included unions and community interest groups. AFFHC grew to become a national organisation in 1964, and adopted its first constitution in 1965.

In 1981, AFFHC adopted a new constitution, and in the mid-1980s, its national office moved from Canberra (where it had been since 1979) to Sydney. In 1992, AFFHC merged with Community Aid Abroad. (Note: Community Aid Abroad is now called Oxfam Australia.)

== Activities ==
Projects undertaken by AFFHC have included appeals for India (1966), East Timor (1975), Kampuchea (1981), and famine relief appeals for Ethiopia, Tigray, and Eritrea (1985).

In June 1971, it began a campaign to drill 6,000 new wells in India's parched regions.

In 1972, AFFHC began funding Aboriginal organisations including the Aboriginal Advancement Association and the Aboriginal Medical Service. The early 1980s saw AFFHC increase its support for indigenous issues and programs, with a grant to the Yipirinya School in the Northern Territory, a campaign calling on the Queensland Government to repeal the Aborigines and Torres Straits Islanders Act of 1971 and support for Aboriginal land councils.
