= Melissa Beowulf =

Australian artist

- Born: 1957 (age 68–69)
- Known for: Portraiture
- Spouse: Thorhammer Beowulf (married c. 1985, widowed 2015)
- Children: Thorsten Halley, Bjorn Toren, Thorin, and Beren

Melissa Beowulf (born 1957) is an Australian artist, specialising in portraiture. She grew up in Sydney, Australia and moved to Canberra in the late 1980s, later working between both Woollahra and Canberra.

== Education ==
Beowulf undertook a masters in Art Practice in Sydney.

== Art awards ==
In 2000, Beowulf was a finalist in the Archibald Prize with a portrait of painter Ken Done.

In 2001, she was selected for the Archibald Prize's Salon des Refusés for her portrait of the National Gallery's Brian Kennedy.

In 2002, she was a finalist in the Doug Moran National Portrait Prize for her portrait of Nancy Wake, later acquired by the National Portrait Gallery. Beowulf chose Wake as a subject to help ensure she got more recognition for her service within Australia.

In 2010, she was a finalist in the Portia Geach Memorial Award with a portrait of comedian Adam Spencer. She was also highly commended for that award in 1998, 2000, 2001 and 2003. Her 1998 entry was a portrait of Pru Goward. Her 2003 entry was a self-portrait.

== Public collections ==
In 2006, the National Portrait Gallery of Australia acquired Beowulf's portrait of war veteran Nancy Wake (2001), with funds provided by Leonard Gordon Darling AM CMG. The Gallery also has her portrait of Donald Horne (2000), received through the Australian Government's Cultural Gifts Program 2015.

== Exhibitions ==
=== Group exhibitions ===
- M16 Artists' Exhibition, Canberra, 21 August - 7 September 2014
- Mystic Visions, Beowulf Galleries Woollahra, June - 29 July 2007
- Unhung heroes, Paintbox Fine Art, May 2005
- The Unhung Heroes, Made for Australia Galleries, Deakin, Canberra, July 2002
- Tenants Show, Leichhardt Street Studios, Kingston, Canberra, September 2001

=== Solo exhibitions ===
- Framework of Injustice, M16 Artspace, Griffith, Canberra February-March 2021

== Personal life ==
Beowulf and her husband, Thorhammer (Thor) Beowulf had five sons; Thorsten Halley, Bjorn Toren, Thorin, and Beren. Thor died from pancreatic cancer on 7 August 2015.

On 12 October that same year, Beowulf's mother-in-law, 81-year-old Katherine Helene Panin, was found dead at the base of some stairs at their shared home in Red Hill. In August 2017, Beowulf and her son Bjorn, faced the ACT Magistrates Court, formally charged with the October 2015 murder of Panin. Both plead not guilty and were remanded in custody. One of Beowulf's other sons, Thorsten, later appeared in the ACT Magistrates Court, and similarly plead not guilty, and was remanded in custody. Their assets may have been frozen, which could have impeded their bail applications.

In September 2017, the National Portrait Gallery stated that Beowulf's portrait of Nancy Wake would not be removed from display, and that nothing would be done while the matter was before the courts.

In early December 2017, the prosecution requested more time for the case, in order to gather financial documents. Beowulf's lawyer, Rachel Bird, noted in her objection that the 15-month investigation had already included a search of the family home for the same information. The trio reappeared at the family violence court on 19 December 2017, and Magistrate Bernadette Boss committed them to stand trial in the ACT Supreme Court on 1 February 2018. For that day, Bjorn, Melissa and Thorsten's cases were included in the court's list.

On 31 October 2018, Beowulf and her sons Bjorn and Thorsten were released on bail in the ACT Supreme Court. Their trial began in the ACT Supreme Court on 19 February 2019. A jury returned the verdict of not guilty for the trio on 12 April 2019.

In 2021, Beowulf held a solo exhibition at M16 Artspace in Griffith, reflecting on her incarceration. The exhibition recreated the rooms at the Alexander Maconochie Centre with sculptural materials.
