= Brian Kenneth Hobbs =

Australian doctor

Dr Brian Hobbs

Brian Kenneth Hobbs (1937–2004) was a medical doctor in Adelaide, South Australia and chair of Community Aid Abroad. He was prominently involved in Aboriginal health in Australia.

== Early life and education ==
Born to Norman Theodore Hobbs, a market gardener, and Dorothy Ada (née Weedon), a schoolteacher, in Paradise, South Australia, a horticultural community on the outskirts of Adelaide, Brian Hobbs attended Campbelltown Primary School and Prince Alfred College, where he boarded after the family moved to Victor Harbor.

Following secondary education, Hobbs attended the University of Adelaide to study medicine and graduated with a Bachelor of Medicine, Bachelor of Surgery.

== Career ==
After graduating from medical school, Hobbs worked and trained in surgery in London and Edinburgh. When he returned to Australia, he took up private practice at Colonel Light Gardens, spending 26 years as a family GP. Subsequently, he worked for Data Aid and the Aboriginal Health Organisation and as a remote area doctor in central Australia.

He retired to Aldgate and then Hindmarsh Island in South Australia.

=== Community and development work ===
In addition to his work as a GP, Hobbs was a co-founder of Medic Alert in Australia and of the Clovelly Park Community Health Centre in southern Adelaide, and taught at Flinders University, where he held the roles of Honorary Tutor in Medicine, and Visiting G.P.

Hobbs worked for most of his adult life with Community Aid Abroad and its successor Oxfam Australia, serving as South Australian Chair, National Chair, and Chair of CAA Trading. He was instrumental in convincing then Foreign Minister Bill Hayden to withdraw aid to the Ethiopian government during their 'civil war' with Eritrea, and was a frequent guest on the Australian Broadcasting Corporation's radio and television current affairs programmes, notably "PM" on Radio National and "Nationwide" on Channel 2. He was also interviewed many times for national and local Australian newspapers, especially "The Australian" and "The Advertiser", on foreign aid and development issues.

Hobbs was a co-founder of International Development Support Services, a consultancy subsidiary of Oxfam Australia, and is named as a "Visionary Leader" by the Community Aid Alliance. He was also a founding member and President of the Schuss Ski Club, which became the de facto representative body for snow skiers in South Australia.

== See also ==
- Oxfam Australia
