= Equinox Summit: Energy 2030 =

2011 international conference in Waterloo, Ontario

The Equinox Summit: Energy 2030 is an international conference that took place from June 5 to 9, 2011 in Waterloo, Ontario. The summit was presented by the Waterloo Global Science Initiative (WGSI) to develop scientific and technological solutions for the world's current energy situation. It examines the present state of energy production, distribution, and storage, and then set benchmarks for where we need to be in the year 2030 to ensure global energy needs are met in a sustainable fashion.

== Blueprint ==
The Equinox Summit: Energy 2030 aims to produce a blueprint detailing what must be done to accelerate the development of alternative, non-carbon producing sources of energy. The blueprint will provide recommended technologies and implementation strategies for future scientific investment. The blueprint will focus on energy production, distribution, and storage. This blueprint is aimed to be released in the year-long global impact phase that follows the Equinox Summit: Energy 2030.

== Summit Format ==
The core of the Equinox Summit: Energy 2030 consisted of three days of working sessions where, under the mentorship of a team of seasoned advisors, a quorum of scientific experts in collaboration with a forum of next-generation leaders will discuss the recommendations and implementation strategies.

The conference ended with the presentation of the Quorum's key findings in the Equinox Communiqué to a group of policymakers, science and technology influencers, and media.

== Quorum ==
The Quorum consisted of a panel of scientific experts representing different approaches to electricity energy production, distribution, and storage. They will present and debate their visions for solutions that will lead to viable sources of low-carbon energy. The Quorum will work towards producing a shortlist of key technology recommendations that policy makers can use to guide investment in science and technology over the next 20 years.

== Forum ==
A Forum of international, emerging leaders in public policy, industry and civil society interacted with the Quorum during the daily working sessions and observe how scientific process can inform policy debate. The Forum further examined the Quorum's findings and propose their own recommendations for implementing the technologies proposed.

== Advisors ==
A panel of advisors advised the Quorum on how to accelerate the research and implementation of future technologies. These advisors were public policy experts, investors and entrepreneurs who are experienced in political and economic aspects of energy, industry leaders, and government figures.

== Public Engagement and Accessibility ==
The Summit provided avenues for public engagement through daily public lectures and panel discussions that focus on energy literacy and other key issues that inform the energy dialogue globally. All public events were streamed live online, broadcast on television, and are archived for future on-demand viewing at wgsi.org.
