= Nikki Stamp =

Australian surgeon and television presenter

Nikki Stamp is an Australian cardiothoracic surgeon. She previously worked for AstraZeneca and is a writer and TV presenter. She has worked in a number of Australian hospitals noted for their heart and lung transplant programs.

Stamp graduated from St Mary's Anglican Girls' School in 1998, and later from the University of Western Australia, completing specialty training in cardiothoracic surgery in 2014. She also went on to study a Master in Health Administration and a Master of Health Policy.

She is known for her commitment to women's heart disease and healthy lifestyles. She has written for the Huffington Post Mamamia, The Age, The Guardian, Sydney Morning Herald, iNews, The Washington Post and has appeared as a health expert on healthcare, health systems, women in surgery, heart disease and healthy lifestyles on a number of websites, print media, radio and television.

Stamp appeared as the host ABC's science program Catalyst in 2017 and again in 2018 and was named by Harpers Bazaar Australia as one of their Women of the Year for 2017 and TimeOut Sydney's 40 under 40. Her first book was released in 2018, published by Murdoch Books, called Can You Die of a Broken Heart?. Her second book, Pretty Unhealthy, was released in 2019, again by Murdoch Books.

Stamp was a part of Seven Network's TV event Operation: Live in February 2019, with Stamp commenting on a live caesarean section, and open heart surgery over a two-night event. Dr Stamp was not the operating surgeon on either of these cases, but was rather acting as a commentator. After concerns voiced by surgeons surrounding the nature of the event, Seven revised the format of the event placing the heart operation on hold. The Royal Australasian College of Surgeons president John Batten stated, "live surgery transmission was appropriate in professional education but not for 'tantalising' TV audiences", the college expressing "grave concerns" and strongly suggesting the show be pre-recorded and edited in case anything goes wrong or it distracts the surgical team. The caesarean section show was well received by audiences, with the open heart surgery yet to be given an air date.
