= Regional Australia =

Area outside of metropolitan Sydney, Brisbane, and Melbourne

Regional Australia is a socio-geographical definition used in Australia to describe populated regions outside of the major metropolitan areas (typically the capital city) in each state or territory, designed for censusing and promoting urbanized settlements (known as regional centres) associated with demographically/economically significant rural regions, especially for the purpose of managing immigration and foreign labour.

People who complete specified work, that being plant and animal cultivation, fishing and pearling, tree farming and felling, mining or construction, in these areas can be granted extra points when applying for a resident visa. Working there while holding a working holiday visa may allow the person to have their visa renewed.

== Scope ==
According to the Australian Department of Home Affairs, all of Australia outside the following areas is considered to be "rural and regional Australia":

- Sydney; Wollongong; Newcastle; Central Coast
- Melbourne
- Brisbane; Gold Coast
- Perth
- Australian Capital Territory

== See also ==
- Outback Australia
