= Sleek Geek Week =

Sleek Geek Week is an annual event in which Dr Karl Kruszelnicki (Julius Sumner Miller Fellow at the University of Sydney) and Adam Spencer travel to several destinations around Australia, presenting free talks on the topic of popular science. Sleek Geek is part of National Science Week in Australia.

In 2005, the inaugural University of Sydney Sleek Geeks Science Eureka Schools Prize was launched as part of University of Sydney Eureka Science Awards. The competition is sponsored by the Faculty of Science at the University of Sydney, with additional support from Abbey’s Bookshop, Sydney and Microsoft. The competition encourages secondary school students to tell a scientific story via a short video piece, in a manner that is enjoyable and accessible for the general public. Entries are to take the form of a 1-3 minute video piece and a 250-word description of the video content.

== 2006 ==
University of Sydney Sleek Geeks Science Eureka Schools Prize - (prizes totalling A$11,000 are shared between contestants and their schools)

=== Winners ===
Alex Lee-Rekers, Olivia Jablonski and Thomas Marr Year 10, Conservatorium High School of Music, New South Wales

- Nanosamurai Defense
- For a simple explanation of the body's complex immune system. Through the clever use of analogies and dramatic action sequences, Alex and Olivia explain how the body's immune system works in a simple and entertaining way.

Kartika Suharto-Martin, Joanna Brooke and Rosa Gollan Year 10, Conservatorium High School of Music, NSW

- Moles
- For an entertaining look at moles (of the skin variety). Not afraid to ask the hard-hitting questions and seek expert advice, the team's journalistic approach unearths some startling facts about moles.

Kaleah Balcomb, Hannah Butler, Matthew Wardrop, Laura Cavanagh and Jonathan Woodbury Year 12, Gosford High School, NSW

- A Brief History of Light
- For a theatrical piece exploring how the theory of light has evolved over the centuries. By consulting with some of the greatest minds in science, such as Faraday, Einstein, and Hawking, the team shows how scientific theories can be ever-changing.

Maddie and Lizzy Finnigan Year 12 and Year 9, Northern Beaches Christian School, NSW

- Inertia, the musical
- For a musical tribute to the laws of inertia. Using well known show tunes and fabulous costumes, Maddie and Lizzie's performance explains inertia in a truly unique way.

== 2005 national finalists ==
  - Thomas Kidd and Sam Jarousek
  - Year 10, Brisbane State High School, South Brisbane, Queensland
  - Busting Myths
  - For a fun look at the myth of the "Supersonic Fly" which tests how fast a small fly can travel using logical and practical evidence.
  - Maddie and Lizzy Finnigan
  - Year 11 and Year 8, Northern Beaches Christian School, Terrey Hills, NSW
  - Science Is Your Friend
  - For an entertaining look at Newton's Third Law of Motion using simple props, easy to understand analogies and some absurd humour.
  - Andrew Katsis and Michael Steinbach
  - Year 11, Gisborne Secondary College, Gisborne, Victoria
  - Cellular Respiration In Humans
  - For a short documentary with outstanding camera work that explains how humans generate energy.
  - Kristian Leadbeater
  - Year 10, Faith Lutheran Secondary School, Tanunda, SA
  - Nobel's Intentions
  - For a dramatic production which tells the story of Alfred Nobel's discovery of dynamite and his subsequent creation of the Nobel Peace Prize.
