= Waterloo Global Science Initiative =

Waterloo Global Science Initiative (WGSI) (2009-2020) was an independent, non-profit organization that catalyzed collective action around complex global problems through events, publications and strategic partnerships. Focus areas included large scale energy decarbonization, high school education, energy access and Canadian implementation of the UN Sustainable Development Goals. An archive of WGSI publications can be found at Google Drive.

WGSI was formed as a partnership between Perimeter Institute for Theoretical Physics and the University of Waterloo.
