= Australian Interactive Media Industry Association =

Trade association, 1992–2015

AIMIA was an association for the digital media industry in Australia from 1992 to 2015. The name derives from the acronym of its original name, the Australian Interactive Media Industry Association, which fell out of use in favour of the acronym. It was best known for its annual awards, informally known as the AMY Awards.

It was the peak Australian body representing the digital content, services and applications industry in Australia, with members drawn from a broad sector of the digital industry, including Australia's digital content, services and applications companies as well as major industry suppliers. After AMIA was wound up in 2015, the Association for Data-driven Marketing and Advertising (ADMA) took over the functions of the organisation, which in 2017 was rebranded as Digital + Technology Collective.

== History of AIMIA and Digital + Technology Collective ==
The Australian Interactive Media Industry Association was founded in 1992 as a not-for-profit membership organisation, by Richard Heale, CEO of Perth-based company Interactive Logic and a group of other invited CEOs from companies in Sydney, Melbourne and Brisbane. The Association had chapters in New South Wales, Victoria, Queensland and South Australia, with the national head office in Sydney. AIMIA's primary focus was on advocating for federal government support for the fledgling "new media" industry, although it did also conduct an awards ceremony in Perth in 1992.

In 1994 the AIMIA board gained funding from the Department of Industry, Science and Technology to appoint the first permanent national CEO, who was Stephen Schwalger (1994-1997), who had been a member of the board. After further lobbying, funds were allocated to AIMIA and the new media industry as part of the "Creative Nation" initiative by the Keating government, launched in the same year in every Australian capital city. Significant components of the Creative Nation initiative included The Multimedia Enterprise, a funding bank for the creation of CD titles, and "Australia on CD", where Australian cultural institutions and new media companies were encouraged to collaborate and bid for a pool of funds to create CD titles that reflected Australian history and culture.

Over the next three years (to 1997), AIMIA grew from a membership of 40 companies to over 800, set up state and federal structure for the association and negotiated state and federal funding for industry development staff in four states, developed and managed a three-year export strategy in conjunction with Austrade. Exports generated in this period exceeded A$250 million on Austrade figures. A national conference program was established.

=== ADMA takeover ===
AIMIA was wound up at the end of 2015, but agreed to host the AMY awards in 2016. In its announcement of going into administration, AIMIA cited a significant change in the industry: "The world of digital has now become so incredibly omnipresent across all industries that the current agency-centric scope of AIMIA is no longer commercially sustainable over the long term".

The Association for Data-driven Marketing and Advertising (ADMA) took over AIMIA, which in July 2017 was rebranded as Digital + Technology Collective, initially headquartered in Melbourne. As of May 2020, and since 2019, the Collective is headquartered in Sydney, as is ADMA (in a different location).

== AMY Awards ==
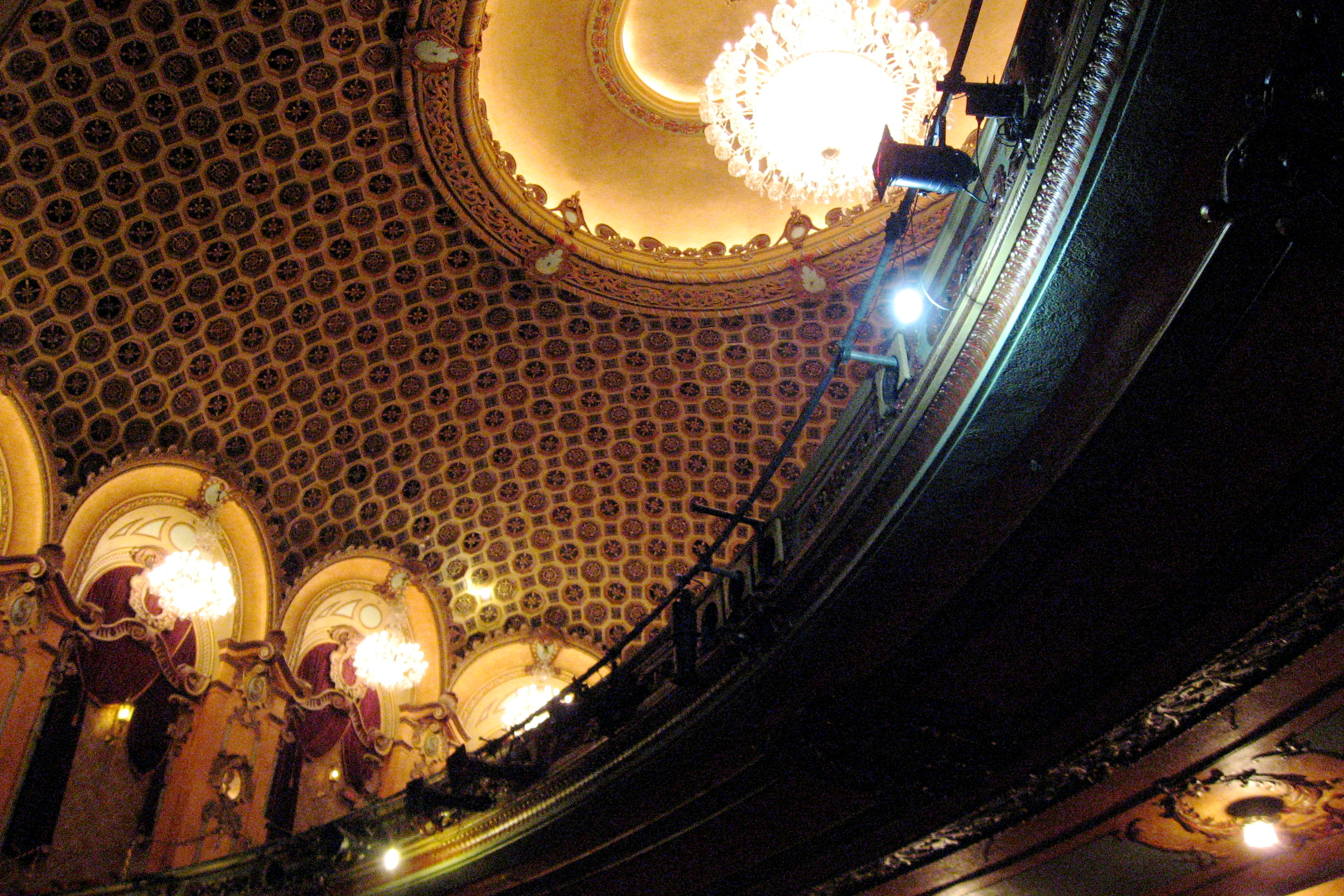
The State Theatre in Sydney was the home of the 13th Annual awards ceremony, held on Friday 2 March 2007.

AIMIA was best known for its annual industry awards for excellence (informally known as the AMY Awards or the AMYs, named after the arm-outstretched statuette awarded) that recognise the best digital work in Australia, established in 1994.

After AIMIA was wound up in 2015, it hosted the awards for the last time in 2016.

In 2017 and 2018 (the latter a revamped version with 23 categories) the Digital + Technology Collective hosted the AMY Awards in Melbourne, and in 2019 ADMA hosted a refashioned edition of the Awards in Sydney in combination with the ADMA Creativity & Effectiveness Awards (AC&Es), which had not been awarded in 2018.

== List of AMY Awards ceremonies ==
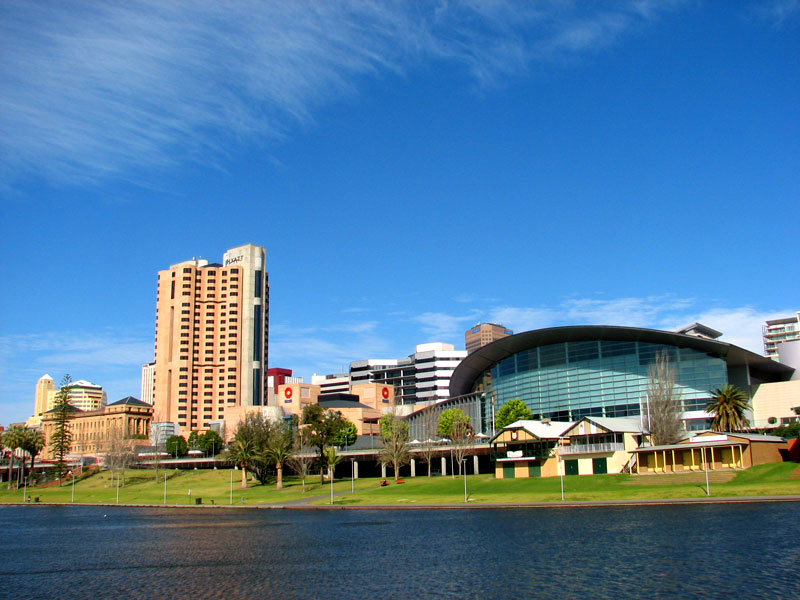
The Adelaide Convention Centre, was home to the 2006 awards ceremony.

Previous venues, VIP guests include:

- 21st Annual awards
- 19th Annual awards, Sydney, Carriageworks
  Hosts:Kitty Flanagan and Steve Philp
- 18th Annual awards, Sydney, Cockatoo Island
  Hosts:Jane Gazzo and Brendan MacLean
- 17th Annual awards, Sydney, Cockatoo Island
  Special Guests Included: Paul Twomey, Former CEO of ICANN
  Adam Spencer, AIMIA Awards Ceremony MC
- 16th Annual awards, Melbourne, Docklands
  Special Guests Included: Stephen Conroy, Minister for Broadband, Communications and the Digital Economy
  Mikey Robins, AIMIA Awards Ceremony MC
- 15th Annual awards, Sydney, Australian Technology Park
- 14th Annual awards, Sydney, NIDA
- 13th Annual awards, Sydney, State Theatre
- 12th Annual awards, Adelaide, Adelaide Convention Centre
  Special Guests included: Honorable Paul Holloway MLC, South Australian Minister for Industry and Trade
  The Honorable Stephanie Key, South Australian Minister for Employment, Training and Further Education
  Mr Kym Richardson MP, Federal Member for Kingston (SA)
- 11th Annual awards, Sydney, Metro Theatre
  Special Guests Included: Helen Coonan, Minister for Communications, IT and the Arts
  Adam Spencer, AIMIA Awards Ceremony MC, Triple J radio host
- 10th Annual awards, Sydney, ABC Ultimo
  Special Guests Included: Daryl Williams, Federal Minister for Communication, IT & the Arts
  Adam Spencer, AIMIA Awards Ceremony MC, Triple J radio host
  Professor Peter A. Bruck, Head of the United Nations World Summit Awards
- 9th Annual awards, Melbourne
- 8th Annual awards, Melbourne
- 7th Annual awards, Melbourne, Convention Centre
- 6th Annual awards, Gold Coast, Royal Pines Resort
- 5th Annual awards, Melbourne, Crown Entertainment Complex
  VIP Guests Included: Victor Perton, Minister for Conservation and Environment and Multimedia
- 4th Annual awards, Melbourne, Crown Entertainment Complex
  VIP Guests Included: Richard Alston, Federal Minister for Communications, IT and the Arts
- 3rd Annual awards, Melbourne
- 2nd Annual awards, Melbourne
  Special Guests Included: Richard Garriott, Computer Games Legend
- 1st Annual awards (1994) - Sydney

== See also ==
- International Academy of Digital Arts and Sciences (US)
- British Interactive Media Association
- Webby Awards (US)
