= Catalyst (TV program) =

Australian science journalism TV program

- Genre: Science
- Country of origin: Australia
- Original language: English
- No. of series: 20

Production
- Executive producer: Aidan Laverty
- Producers: Penny Palmer, Ingrid Arnott, Geraldine McKenna, Paul Schneller, Matthew Lovering, Adam Collins, Karen Appathurai
- Editors: Vaughan Smith, Andrew Glover, Meredith Hopes, Rowan Tucker-Evans, Chris Spurr, Lile Judickas
- Camera setup: Kevin May, Ron Ekkle
- Running time: 30 minutes (2001–2016); 60 minutes (2017–present)

Original release
- Network: ABC
- Release: 9 August 2001 – 9 August 2022

Related
- Quantum (1985–2001)

Catalyst is an Australian science journalism television program broadcast by ABC. As of 2022, it was the only science program on primetime television in Australia. Launched in 2001, it replaced Quantum which had ceased the previous year. Catalyst was regularly broadcast on ABC TV at 8:30 pm on Tuesdays and repeated at 6:00 pm on Sundays.

== Overview ==
The show broadcast stories on scientific themes, and in particular significant recent developments and discoveries. It focuses primarily on stories relevant to Australia, but the series covers international developments as well. It attempts to convey information in a way that is not only accurate but also interesting and informative to the general population, often discussing the ethical, political and other implications of scientific discoveries and research as well as the discoveries themselves. The show's website says that "Catalyst, Australia's flagship weekly science program, showcases Australian and global science discoveries".

Examples of Catalyst featured segments include "Corporate Psychopaths", "The Truth About Vitamins", and "Smell and Schizophrenia".

The show originally was broadcast in a 30-minute format. Following a series of controversies and an internal review of the program, the ABC announced in November 2016 that Catalyst would shift to a 60-minute format starting in 2017.

The new format utilised out-of-house experts in their respective fields, presenting 60-minute in depth documentaries. Episodes have included "The Great Australian Bee Challenge", "Bionic Revolution", "Feeding Australia" and "The Secret To Making Better Decisions".

== Staff ==
Over Catalyst's history, staff have included:

=== Presenters and reporters ===
- Paul West, former chef and farmer
- Dr Caroline West, GP
- Dr Sarah McKay, neuroscientist.
- Prof Tamara Davis, astrophysicist
- Dr Preeya Alexander, GP
- Dr Ann Jones, 'nature nerd'
- Angharad "Rad" Yeo, technology reporter
- Matt Okine, comedian and actor
- Tom Gleeson, comedian and physics grad
- Myf Warhurst, radio announcer and television presenter
- Dr Garnett Hall, veterinarian
- Dr Niraj Lal, energy researcher and author
- Lily Serna, mathematician
- Nikki Stamp, cardiothoracic and transplant surgeon
- Brad McKay, GP
- Dr Joanna McMillan, dietitian
- Dr Shalin Naik, stem cell biologist
- Derek Muller, physicist
- Jonica Newby, veterinarian
- Jordan Nguyen, biomedical engineer
- Graham Phillips, astrophysicist
- Anja Taylor, model, actress, reporter and producer
- Maryanne Demasi, investigative journalist and presenter
- Alan Duffy, astronomer
- Tim Flannery, palaeontologist and environmental activist

== Controversy ==
A series of episodes ("Heart of the Matter", parts 1 and 2) broadcast in October 2013 which questioned the link between saturated fat, cholesterol and heart disease, as well as the widespread use of anti-cholesterol drugs known as statins, came under criticism from doctors and the National Heart Foundation of Australia. The foundation estimates that in the wake of those episodes up to 55,000 patients may have stopped taking their medication, leading to a potential increase in heart attacks and strokes over the next five years. In May 2014 the ABC removed both episodes from its website, after an internal review found that the second episode (but not the first) involved one breach of ABC standards on impartiality and there was a problem of omission of important information.

"Wi-Fried?", an episode broadcast in February 2016 featuring American epidemiologist Devra Davis, courted further controversy by claiming that electromagnetic radiation emitted by devices such as mobile phones lead to an increased risk of brain cancer in heavy users, contrary to the mainstream view that exposure to such emissions is largely safe. The show faced criticism from local experts, viewers and scientists disputing the episode's claims, with public health professor Simon Chapman stating that "this is not the first time Catalyst have aired a questionable episode, and there really needs to be a review of their editorial process". An investigation by the ABC's independent Audience and Consumer Affairs Unit found that the episode breached editorial policies standards on accuracy and impartiality, later leading to the withdrawal of the episode from the ABC website. The controversy led to the temporary suspension of reporter Dr. Maryanne Demasi from the show and is the second time since Heart of the Matter, Parts 1 and 2 to have breached editorial standards. It also led to the ABC reviewing the future strategy and direction of the program, leading to format changes for the following series.

== See also ==
- Nova
- BBC Horizon
- List of Australian television series
- List of longest-running Australian television series
