= Walk Against Want =

Annual charity event

The Walk Against Want is an annual event held in support of Oxfam Australia (formerly Community Aid Abroad), an independent organisation that works with communities in 27 countries on development projects, humanitarian relief efforts, and advocacy campaigns.

The Walk Against Want was originally intended to represent the distances that women in developing countries must walk every day to get clean water, seeing participation in the walk as a tangible action that could help to build a sense of connection and contribution to global development issues.

Walk Against Want events are organised by volunteers, and 100% of funds raised through sponsorships or donations go to Oxfam Australia's program fund for community development. Several volunteer-run events in 2007 have diversified the Walk's original premise, to include greater distances, water-carrying or balancing challenges, and other development-focused activities, with the objective of raising awareness at the same time as generating funds for development projects.

Walks are open to participation by anyone, and businesses, community groups or schools often form teams to walk together. After registering for the Walk they are encouraged to raise money by collecting "sponsorship" pledges from friends and family, through sponsorship sheets or online donations.

Walks ranging from 5km to 45km in distance are held in many locations around Australia (over 60 in 2005, and around 100 in 2006). Many schools and community groups organise their own events each year, or participate in larger events in cities or regional centres.

2006 marked the Walk's 40th anniversary. Over the past 40 years, more than 20,000 people have participated in Walk Against Want events and have generated more than $10 million in funds for community development projects.
