= Redkite (organisation) =

Non-government charity organisation based in Sydney, Australia

- Formation: 1983, New South Wales
- Headquarters: Surry Hills NSW 2010
- Region served: Australia
- Services: Financial assistance; counselling and emotional support through social workers and music therapists.
- Chair: Mark Rigotti
- Income: ▲$11,880,658.00 (2017)
- Expenses: ▲$11,841,331.00 (2017)
- Website: https://www.redkite.org.au/

Redkite is a non-government charity organisation based in Sydney, Australia. It supports young cancer patients up to the ages of 18 and their families with financial assistance, emotional and mental health support including counselling for diagnosed children and their siblings, practical support and information, as well as funding social workers and music therapists in paediatric oncology wards. The organisation operates in all Australian states and has raised $11.88 million through fundraising activities in the 2017 financial year with net surplus totalling $39,000. It currently has 68 employees, 501-1000 active volunteers and 9 board members.

Redkite is registered as a charity with the Australian Charities and Not-for-profit as a Public Benevolent Institution endorsed to access tax concessions including; Goods and Services Tax (GST) concession, Fringe Benefits Tax (FBT) exemption and Income Tax Exemption.

== History ==
The organisation was founded in New South Wales in August 1983 under the name the Malcolm Sargent Cancer Fund for Children in Australia. The name was inspired by Sir Malcolm Sargent who died of pancreatic cancer in 1967.

It began with providing basic financial grants and practical assistance however later developed other services to support families with children that have cancer. It was then established in Queensland, Western Australia and Victoria. In 2005, the Malcolm Sargent Cancer Funds in New South Wales, Queensland and Western Australia merged. Victoria joined later in 2007. The entity formally changed their name to Redkite in that year. The organisation still operates in all Australian states.

== Purpose ==
Redkite's purpose is to provide essential support to people diagnosed with cancer of ages 0–18 and their families with financial assistance and social services. They provide their services to patients in all stages of their illness.

== Financials ==
In the 2017 financial year, Redkite reported a total revenue of $11.88 million with net profit $39,000. Their fundraising activities include income investments (4.19%), donations and bequests (8.93%) and Other Revenues (86.88%). Other revenues include fundraising from events, communities, trusts and foundations, corporate and campaigns. Their surplus amounted to $39,000 by the end of the 2017 financial year with expenses on Grants and Donations in Australia (59.04%), Employees salaries and administrative costs (29.15%) and Other expenses (11.81%). Although revenue had expanded, net profit had declined from $51,000 in FY2016. Assets for FY2017 had increased to $16.52 million from $14.91 million in FY2016. Net assets (the total of current assets less the total of current liabilities) for the financial year stood at $8.96 million, compared with $8.31 million in FY2016.

$1.2 million was raised at the 2017 Redkite corporate quiz through attendees and sponsors. It is an annual charity event attended by leaders from the business and philanthropic communities. Attendees compete in three rounds of trivia with their teams for the title of the "smartest company".

== Programs ==
=== Hospital based support ===
Redkite funds oncology social workers in hospitals who provide psychosocial assessments and treatment to cancer patients and their families related to illness adjustment, coping mechanisms and discharge planning. Oncology social workers are also responsible for maintaining communication with their patients health care providers to document their patients cancer journey and ensure the means for treatment are best achieved. The charity invests in Music Therapy for their cancer patients due to the stress and depression associated with cancer. Redkite claims it is the largest non-government funder of children and adolescent oncology social work in Australia.

=== Community based support ===
The charity provides financial assistance to families for living expenses such as groceries and bills. In 2017, $1.952 million was spent on financial assistance. As a component for discharge planning for patients, it sometimes provides scholarships. These funds amounted to $400,000 in 2017.

== Partners and Supporters ==
Redkite's leading partner is Coles Supermarkets, an Australia's retail chain with 807 retail stores across Australia. Research indicates that community awareness of Redkite was largely due to Coles. In 2013, community awareness of the charity rose by 8%, just one year after their partnership began. 65% of people who had heard of Redkite had done so in relation to Coles supermarkets. Since their partnership began in 2013, Coles has raised $30 million for Redkite. These funds were mainly generated through 5c donations on the sale of every Coles Brand bread loaf, promoting Redkite in-store and online which also includes collecting donations for Redkite from team members and customers, and running other donation campaigns during the festive seasons. 50% of the money raised was from the sale of specially marked Coles Brand bread.

The charity is also in partnership with major Australian sports teams such as Sydney Swans, Fremantle Dockers and the national rugby union team. Sydney Swans have been in partnership with Redkite for over 17 years. The annual Redkite Celebrity AFL match is played between two teams consisting of Australian Celebrities and Redkite supporters . The game is played on Sydney Swans home stadium. Teams also compete to accrue the most donations from supporters, which go directly to Redkite. The Fremantle Dockers and Sydney Swans compete annually in a friendly match for the Redkite Cup in support of the charity.

== Controversy ==
In 2018, staff members from a particular Coles supermarket store were told to make compulsory donations to Redkite during the store's 'Mufti Day'. Coles responded immediately through Twitter stating that donations are voluntary for team members and that it had removed this practise from the store.

=== Redkite fraud scandal ===
A former hockey player for the Australian national team, Kate Hubble, had pleaded guilty to defrauding Redkite after pretending to be diagnosed with cancer for financial advantage. Hubble had continued to receive her $73,000 salary from her job at Redkite and was also paid sick leave. In early 2015, Hubble informed colleagues about her cancer diagnosis which was supported by forged medical letters from a Perth oncologist. A letter from Hubble's GP advised Redkite to allow her to work from home at her own discretion. Her employment was terminated after Redkite's investigation. Kate Hubble was fined on four charges totalling to $2620 plus a two-year good behaviour bond.

=== Home brand bread ===
Critics argue that the Redkite label found on Coles's popular bread loafs which displays a donation sign indicating a 5c donation to the charity is used to distract consumers from the effects of cheap bread loaves in Australia's largest supermarkets, Coles and Woolworths. The pricing of the bread loaves would force bakeries and independent retailers to lower prices and potentially cause them to exit the market due to profitability. This was deemed anti-competitive by South Australian Senator Nick Xenophon. However, Woolworths’ managing director, Tjeerd Jegen, states cheap bread would make a "great difference to a family's budget".

== See also ==
- Childhood Cancer
