= Quantum (TV series) =

TV series from Australia

Quantum is an Australian television show about science and technology that aired on ABC television for 16 years. It was first broadcast on 16 July 1985, and aired its last episode on 26 April 2001. Since then, the show has been replaced by Catalyst. Quantum was preceded on the ABC by Towards 2000, which itself became Beyond 2000 and later Beyond Tomorrow.
