= Deadly Down Under =

Australian television series

- Genre: Documentary comedy
- Presented by: Paul Fenech
- Country of origin: Australia
- Original language: English
- No. of seasons: 1
- No. of episodes: 10

Production
- Running time: 30 minutes

Original release
- Network: 7mate
- Release: 11 October 2018 – present

Deadly Down Under is an Australian comedy reality television series on the Seven Network's 7mate. The series follows host Paul Fenech and presenters Jacquie Rodriquez and Elle Cooper in search of the deadly of the deadliest creatures and places in Australia. They dive with great white sharks, handle venomous snakes and wrestle crocodiles, meet with the survivors of deadly attacks and trawl the history books for the deadliest events on record.

== Cast ==
- Paul Fenech
- Jacquie Rodriquez
- Elle Cooper
- Fonz

== See also ==
- Bogan Hunters
- Housos
- Fat Pizza vs. Housos
