= Brendan Jones (radio personality) =

Australian radio personality (born 1968)

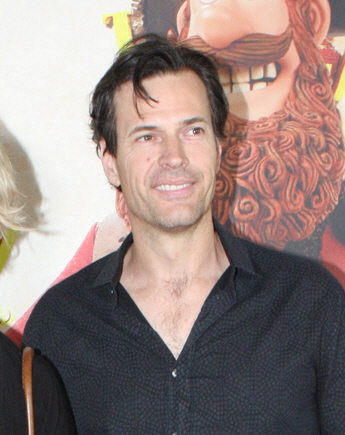
- Jones in 2012
- Born: 3 April 1968 (age 58); Sydney, Australia
- Other name: Jonesy
- Occupations: Radio presenter, media personality
- Years active: 1990–present
- Spouse: Helen Jones
- Children: 3

Brendan Jones (born 3 April 1968) is an Australian radio presenter, actor, media personality and motorcycling enthusiast.

Jones co-hosts Jonesy & Amanda with Amanda Keller on Gold 101.7 since 2003 as part of the Australian Radio Network.

== Career ==
Brendan Jones began working in radio on the community radio station 2BCR Bankstown for six months. In 1990 he obtained a night job at 6KA Karratha, Western Australia, followed by mornings and afternoons at 2NM Muswellbrook and then afternoons at i98FM Wollongong, both in New South Wales.

His biggest hosting gigs have been late nights on B105 Brisbane, afternoons with Triple M Brisbane and Triple M Sydney afternoons where he achieved the highest daytime figure for the station at 17.9%, then on mornings and then drive. He also hosted a national countdown show called Planet Rock.

Jones is currently presenting drive time radio on Gold 101.7, with Amanda Keller, having previously co-hosted breakfast radio together from 2005-2025. When hosting breakfast, the show became the number 1 FM station in 2005 with 8.9% audience share defeating Merrick & Rosso. It has been reported that Jones has a centre-right political viewpoint.

Jones and Keller host "My Generation" which is aired on ninety-seven stations nationally each week and won best on-air team at the 2012 ACRA's, a first in this category for ARN.

Jones makes a regular appearance on the daytime television chat show Mornings with Sonia and David and has hosted Off the Record on the World Movies channel, Australia's Greatest Footy Fan and Do it Green. He has also appeared on The Trophy Room, Campaign, Today Australia and The Morning Show on 7, as well as Joker Poker, The Footy Show, The Project and the popular culture show 20 to 1. Jones had a supporting role in the comedy series Swift & Shift Couriers and featured in the TV Series Housos as a journalist, a role he also played in Fat Pizza.

Jones is currently a co-host of Temporary Australians, a motorcycling show on TVS (Series 1) and ONE (Series 2), and writes a monthly column for Live to Ride magazine.

During October 2013, he participated as a contestant during the thirteenth season of Dancing with the Stars. His professional partner was Alana Patience. He was eliminated on the fifth week with a score of 24.

In 2014, Jones was featured on 7mate's successful television series Bogan Hunters as one of eight celebrity judges. Later that year, Jones scored a role in the motion picture Fat Pizza vs. Housos.

He made a cameo appearance in episode 7547 of The Bold and the Beautiful alongside Amanda Keller and Ita Buttrose as a news reporter.

Jones is the narrator in both season 1 and 2 of Australian show Motorbike Cops.

== Personal life ==
Jones and wife Helen have three children, and are currently living in Sydney. Jones is also a fan of the Cronulla-Sutherland Sharks in the National Rugby League.

== Filmography ==
Year	Title	Role	Notes
2019	The Celebrity Chase	Himself	1 episode
2019	Celebrity Name Game	Himself	3 episodes
2018	Hughesy, We Have a Problem	Himself	Celebrity Problem
2017	The Bold & the Beautiful	Second Reporter	
2014	Fat Pizza vs. Housos	Campbell Abbott	
2014	Bogan Hunters	Celebrity judge	
2012–2013	Temporary Australians	Presenter	
2012	Housos vs. Authority	AC presenter	
2011	Housos	Reporter	9 episodes
2011	The Trophy Room	Himself	Season 1, Episode 5
2009–2010	The Project	Himself	3 episodes
2009	Top Gear Australia	Himself	Season 2, Episode 6
2008–2011	Swift & Shift Couriers	Jonathon Turnbull; Jonathon Bourke M.D. Mr. J. Burn né Jonathon Turnbull	12 episodes
2007–2010	20 to 1	Himself	25 episodes
2007	Pizza	Karl Stiffanovic	2 episodes
