= Darradong Local Council =

2023 Australian television sitcom

- Genre: Sitcom
- Written by: Paul Fenech
- Directed by: Paul Fenech
- Starring: Paul Fenech; George Kapiniaris; Jon-Bernard Kairouz; Vince Sorrenti; Katrina Spadone; Garry Who; Kevin Taumata; Renzo Bellato; Joe June; Krissy Stanley; Patrick Spicer; Angry Anderson
- Country of origin: Australia
- Original language: English
- No. of series: 1
- No. of episodes: 8

Production
- Producers: Paul Fenech; Matt Bowie
- Cinematography: Adam Mcphilbin
- Editor: David Rudd
- Camera setup: Single-camera
- Running time: 30 minutes
- Production company: Antichocko Productions

Original release
- Network: Seven Network
- Release: 26 October – 23 November 2023

Related
- Pizza; Swift and Shift Couriers; Housos

Darradong Local Council is an Australian television sitcom that first screened on 7mate and 7plus from 26 October to 23 November 2023. Written, produced and directed by Paul Fenech, the series follows a group of corrupt council workers in the fictional Shire of Darradong.

== Plot ==
Set in the fictional Shire of Darradong, located in New South Wales, the series follows the lives and interactions of a group of corrupt and lazy council workers. The shire mayor, Theo Theopolous, is having an affair with a married woman, and, along with deputy mayor Feraz Younan and councillor Vinnie Calabria, is making secretive business deals with Chinese investors. The council parliament have voted to demolish the shire's libraries in favour of building skyscrapers, council manager Garry is making regular "inspections" to Darradong's brothels, and council workers Fox, Kiwi Bob and Benny are attempting to outdo each other with their excessive bludging. But the comfortable lives of the council workers could soon be over, following a decision from State Premier Mason Fraser, who has decided to amalgamate all corrupt councils into one "supercouncil"... and Darradong Council is first on his list.

== Cast ==
- Paul Fenech as Sam "Fox" Foxitini
- George Kapiniaris as Mayor Theo Theopolous
- Jon-Bernard Kairouz as Deputy Mayor Feraz Younan
- Vince Sorrenti as Vincent "Vinnie" Calabria
- Katrina Spadone as Chevonne Mancini
- Garry Who as Garry McDuffy
- Kevin Taumata as Kiwi Bob
- Renzo Bellato as Renzo Gigliotti
- Joe June as Xiao Zhang
- Krissy Stanley as Bronwyn Abbot
- Patrick Spicer as Bob Brown
- Angry Anderson as Patto McCallum
- Melissa Tkautz as Tanya Buttrose
- Ashur Shimon as Khalid Khamis
- Lee Priest as Parking Officer
- Waseem Khan as Pavan Gupta
- Nvalaye Sesay as Ade Mubutu
- Umit Bali as Krishna
- Paul Wilson as State Premier Mason Fraser
- Benny Bogan as Benny Kelly
- Christine Abadir as Fatima Younan
- James Liotta as Doris "Jamo" Debono
- Maria Tran as Madame Kara

== Production ==
The series was produced in 2022 by Antichocko Productions for the Seven Network.

=== Development ===
In 2016, Paul Fenech produced a pilot episode for Darradong Local Council, but the pilot never went to air and a full series was never created. The unaired pilot was later broadcast on 7mate and released on 7plus as a special episode, followed the airing of the eighth episode on 23 November 2023.

In May 2023, Fenech described his new series as being "all about the corruption, lazy council workers, the stuff you see in the news all the time. A lot of it is straight out of the headlines. Councils are an easy source of material because you can’t believe some of the stuff they've actually done." Fenech cited former Deputy Mayor of Auburn City Council, Salim Mehajer, as a prominent example of the corruption found within local councils. Mehajer had been found guilty of electoral fraud in April 2018.

Like his other series, Fenech hired a diverse cast for the series, explaining that "the only importance I place on our casting is that it looks and sounds like Australia. We don’t just hire people of different colours who sound exactly the same. Our cast actually brings some cultural nuance."

Fenech also acknowledged the emergence of political correctness in Australian society, stating that: "The Australian sense of humour used to be more broad and rude, a little cheeky. It was about the concept of a larrikin – but there aren't as many viewers with that older sensibility anymore. There's no appreciation for that generation. They're being forced to forget everything they grew up with and just accept things." Fenech went on to explain: "I know comedians who are getting a lot of work because they say and do woke comedy. It's a lot easier if you fall under that umbrella these days. If you go too far against the grain you can have your career ruined and from a creative point of view that's pretty scary." Fenech concluded: "I still wouldn't be surprised if I suddenly got cancelled."

In an interview published a month before the series went to air, James Liotta, who plays non-binary character Doris "Jamo" Debono, described the show as one that "deals with government and corruption and all the red tape that councils get involved in that they shouldn't. Some people asked if it was a documentary... everyone seemed to think it was based on their council, but it's not based on any one council. It's an amalgamation of all the crap that councils do to their community." Liotta described his character as "one of the core staff members who goes to Thailand and then comes back gender neutral, so everyone has to tippy-toe around me. We make fun of all the woke stuff that happens these days".

== Episodes ==
The series debuted on 26 October 2023, at 9:30 pm on 7mate and 7plus. Following the airing of the eighth episode on 23 November 2023, a special episode titled "Darradong from the Beginning", was screened on the same night. The episode consisted of interviews, series highlights, and contained the original pilot episode for the series, which was produced in 2016.

No.	Title	Directed by	Written by	Original release date
1	"Welcome to the Jungle"	Paul Fenech	Paul Fenech	26 October 2023
The media and state government shine a light on the corrupt council of Darradong Shire. Mayor Theo asks Fox to steal lawn furniture for his ex-wife, leading to a massive punch up with council rivals.
2	"Drug Testing"	Paul Fenech	Paul Fenech	2 November 2023
Fox and his crew are accused of being on drugs due to a series of fake news media stories. The Premier demands action from Mayor Theo who decides to drug test the entire staff of Darradong Council.
3	"Special Investigations"	Paul Fenech	Paul Fenech	2 November 2023
Due to so much bad press and allegations of corruption, the state Premier sends a special investigator to Darradong Town Hall to sniff around. Theo asks Fox and Kiwi Bob to steal a bidet for his ex.
4	"The Sex Tape"	Paul Fenech	Paul Fenech	9 November 2023
Mayor Theo and his new girlfriend Tanya are caught on camera having sex in a disabled toilet. Staff member Jamo Debono returns from long service leave to announce they identify as non-binary.
5	"The Lucky Pussy"	Paul Fenech	Paul Fenech	9 November 2023
Chinese businessmen pay Theo, Vinnie and Feraz bribe money hidden inside an Asian waving cat statue. The "lucky pussy" is misplaced by Fox and Xiao during a wild drunken night of karaoke.
6	"The Special Performance"	Paul Fenech	Paul Fenech	16 November 2023
Fox and Xiao travel to Coober Pedy in South Australia searching for the "lucky pussy" full of cash. Greens politician Bob Brown convinces Theo to put on a children's performance about climate change.
7	"Staff Fun Day"	Paul Fenech	Paul Fenech	16 November 2023
With the Premiers' investigation continuing and media attacks on Darradong Council, Theo attempts to keep morale up by using council rates to pay for a mini golf day for the entire council staff.
8	"The Corruption Commission"	Paul Fenech	Paul Fenech	23 November 2023
The Premier holds a corruption investigation. Fox, Kiwi Bob, Benny and all the councillors are called to give evidence. Theo and Feraz hatch a scheme to avoid attending.

== Ratings ==
Ratings were poor for the second and third episodes of the series, screened on 7mate: the episodes received an average of 45,000 Australian viewers. However, David Knox acknowledged that, as the episodes were screened in a late-night timeslot, "they can't be expected to draw big crowds". He also wrote that "by 9:30pm there weren't exactly big crowds anywhere".

== Reception ==
Reception for the series was mixed. A month before the airing of the first episode, Wagga Wagga councillor Richard Foley was enthusiastic about the series, while his colleague Councillor Georgie Davies believed that the series negatively portrayed council workers as lazy when the opposite was true. "A lot of people think they're lazy [but] it's not the experience I've had in council. The council workers I've dealt with are incredibly hard-working, they are really driven and motivated." She went on to add: "We struggle to recruit good candidates for council jobs. These shows don't help... I might be seen as a Debbie Downer, but someone has to stick up for council staff, they work so hard."

When the first episode aired in October 2023, Australian television historian Andrew Mercado wrote that he admired the show's diverse casting and the show's setting within a corrupt council, stating that "the story potential is enormous". He went on to write that "Fenech's formula has served him well for [his previous series]", but stated that the series needed to "up the ante because this series is better than Benny Hill-like sight gags where leaf blowers are blown up girls' mini skirts". Mercado noted that "the show is made for a bogan audience", but stated that the show is "walking a fine line that's getting too repetitive". He also criticised Fenech's character Fox, "his dumbest portrayal yet", who possesses "a nastiness [...] that isn't translating into laughs". Mercado concluded by writing that: "The wild punch-ups and sex scandals can stay, but let's see some sharper satire and some more work on those political parties. Darradong's Greens councillor is stereotypical and lazy, but there is nothing yet in the first two episodes that differentiates between who is Labor and Liberal."

== See also ==
- Local government in Australia
