= Jabba (presenter) =

Australian television presenter

- Born: Jason Davis; 15 September 1973 (age 53); Sydney, New South Wales, Australia
- Occupations: Television presenter VJ radio host actor
- Years active: 1995–present
- Known for: Channel [V], Housos

Jason Davis (born 15 September 1973 in Sydney, New South Wales, Australia), known professionally as Jabba, is an Australian presenter, who first made a name for himself as part of the launch of subscription television in Australia in 1995. He was a host for music television station "Red" on the now-defunct Galaxy subscription television network, before the channel changed its name to Channel V (also known as [V]). Jason the jabba was part of a famous Incubus live performance at a secret gig at Bondi in 2002.

== Early life ==
Born Jason Davis, Jabba attended Hunters Hill Primary School, where he gained his name, and James Ruse Agricultural High School. He also played with the All Saints Hunters Hill soccer team, and Parramatta Waterpolo Club.

== Career ==
Jabba began presenting for Galaxy's [V] in 1994. He hosted a variety of shows including The Joint and Jabba's Morning Glory, which featured performances and interviews with prominent musicians including Pink and Beastie Boys. During his time with [V], he played the role of Davo 'Dazza' Dinkum in the SBS television comedy show Pizza and Swift and Shift Couriers.

In 2004, Jabba participated in the Band in a Bubble project with Australian alternative rock band Regurgitator, which involved him being locked in a Big Brother-style environment with the group and their engineers while they produced an album under 24-hour surveillance. During this time, it was revealed that he had separated from his long-term partner and mother of his children. Following the project's conclusion, Jacquie Riddell of XYZnetworks, announced that Jabba would be taking an extended break, stating that "(the bubble) was a pretty big deal". In 2005, he left [V] and began presenting for Nova FM in Brisbane.

Jabba later moved back home to Sydney, working at Nova 96.9 hosting The All New Nova Top 10 with Jabba and Mel, while still also hosting the Motorola ARIA Charts show on Sunday afternoons, Nova's only national show. In November 2008, Jabba and Mel left The All New Nova Top 10 with Jabba and Mel and were replaced by James Kerley and Maz Compton.

Jabba was also the host of Great BBQ Challenge, a competition series on Foxtel's LifeStyle Food channel. It was a reality-style contest to find Australia's best BBQer, who would win $25,000 and go on to host their own show on Lifestyle Food. He has been named by some (one actually) as a 'social recalcitrant'. "It sort of slid when he left the international passport to smoking pleasure behind".

In March 2010, Jabba became host of a new breakfast radio program with Mike Goldman called Macarthur Breakfast on the Win TV Network’s C91.3 FM in Campbelltown, NSW. Jabba and Mike left the station in December 2010, after refusing to move to Campbelltown, because it was deemed important for the station to be as local as possible.

In 2011, he appeared on two SBS sitcoms: Swift and Shift Couriers and Housos. In 2014 he was featured in the motion picture Fat Pizza vs. Housos.

Jabba also writes a column for the Australian edition of Rolling Stone.

In 2013, Jabba joined the Seven Network's Weekend Sunrise as a movie reviewer.

== Filmography ==
=== Film ===
Year	Title	Role	Type
1998	Somewhere in the Darkness		
2002	Garage Days		Feature film
2002	Incubus – Bondi RSL		
2003	Fat Pizza	Davo Dinkum	Feature film
2012	Housos vs. Authority	Darren 'Dazza' Smith	Feature film
2014	Fat Pizza vs. Housos	Darren 'Dazza' Smith	Feature film

=== Television ===
Year	Title	Role	Type
1999	The Joint	Host	
2000–07	Pizza	Middle Class Homeboy & Davo Dinkum	TV series
2002	Jabba's Morning Glory	Host	TV series
2004	Pizza Live	Davo Dinkum	TV series
2006	World Record Pizza	Davo Dinkum	TV series
2006	Pull Up Selecta	Host	TV series
2006–07	Great BBQ Challenge	Host	TV series
2007–10	20 to 1	Host	TV series
2008	2008 National Musicoz Awards	Host	TV special
2008; 2011	Swift and Shift Couriers	Various characters	TV series
2009	Dirtgirlworld	Hayman (voice)	Animated TV series
2011	Jabba's Curious World	Presenter	TV series
2011	The Essential 20	Presenter	TV series
2011	Housos	Dazza	TV series
2013–2026	Weekend Sunrise	Movie Reviewer	
2017-present	Jabba's Movies School Holiday Special	Host	
2021-	Jabba's Movies	Host	

== Awards ==
Jabba was nominated for and won the Best Music Personality at the 2007 Australian Commercial Radio Awards held at Crown Casino.
