= Fat Pizza vs. Housos =

- DVD cover
- Directed by: Paul Fenech
- Written by: Paul Fenech
- Produced by: Paul Fenech; Joe Weatherstone
- Starring: Paul Fenech; Elle Dawe; Kevin Taumata; Tahir Bilgiç; Rob Shehadie; Johnny Boxer; Paul Nakad; Nick Giannopoulos; Angry Anderson; Vanessa Davis; Jason "Jabba" Davis
- Cinematography: Mike Kliem
- Edited by: David Rudd
- Music by: Theme song by Heaven the Axe
- Distributed by: Transmission Films
- Release date: 27 November 2014
- Running time: 99 minutes
- Country: Australia
- Language: English
- Budget: $750,000
- Box office: $554,003

Fat Pizza vs. Housos is an Australian comedy film based on the combination of the stories and characters of the SBS series Pizza and the comedy series Housos, both created by Paul Fenech. The film began screening in Australian cinemas on 27 November 2014.

== Plot ==
After serving 15 years in jail for assaulting a health inspector with a chainsaw, pizza chef Bobo Gigliotti is released. Upon his release, he and his Mama attempt to reopen Fat Pizza, their former business in the fictional Sydney suburb of Hashfield. They soon find that due to rent increases since the time they were last in business, the only place that they can afford to reopen their pizzeria is in the infamous housing commission suburb of Sunnyvale. Employing many of their previous workers including Sleek the Elite, as well as a few locals, their re-establishment in Sunnyvale results in conflict with the local housos, notably Shazza Jones, Franky Falzoni and Kev the Kiwi.

The movie briefly includes references to Fenech's two other television series, with Franky Falzoni stealing a van belonging to Swift and Shift Couriers early in the film and a segment from Bogan Hunters being shown on TV in a scene where Franky is watching television.

The film features a "thongarang", which is a boomerang made of two bolted-together thongs.

== Production ==
The film was written and produced in only 10 months on a modest budget of around $1 million. Filming occurred in western Sydney, Melbourne and Canberra. The film is dedicated to Alfred "Freddie" Fenech OAM.

=== Casting ===
The movie features almost the entire all-star cast of the TV series "Fat Pizza" and "Housos". Notable among those missing is Rebel Wilson who played Toula in "Fat Pizza". Producer Paul Fenech noted that her high profile status in Hollywood made it difficult for her to find time to return to Australia for filming.

== Reception ==
Fat Pizza vs Housos debuted at 8th place in Australian movie ticket sales, earning $280,604 in 52 theatres during its opening weekend. It was the only Australian-made film to feature in the weekend's top 10.

Long after 1000 sensitive, lyrical mood pieces have been forgotten, there'll surely be a place in Australian film history for the unsinkable Paul Fenech – writer-director-star of Fat Pizza, Housos vs Authority, and now Fat Pizza vs Housos, in which the characters from two of his knockabout TV comedies go head to head on the big screen.

— Jake Wilson, The Sydney Morning Herald.

== Cast and characters ==
- Paul Fenech as Franky Falzoni, a resident of the Sunnyvale Housing Commission and Pauly's cousin
  - Fenech also portrays Pauly Falzoni, a worker at Fat Pizza and Franky's cousin
- Elle Dawe as Sharon 'Shazza' Jones, a resident of the Sunnyvale Housing Commission and Dazza's de facto
- Kevin Taumata as Kevin 'Kev the Kiwi' Takamata, a resident of the Sunnyvale Housing Commission and Vanessa's de facto
- Vanessa Davis as Vanessa Talawahoo, a resident of the Sunnyvale Housing Commission and Kev's de facto
- Johnny Boxer as Bobo Gigliotti, the owner, operator and chef of Fat Pizza, who reopens Fat Pizza, after being released from jail
- Maria Venuti as Mama Gigliotti, Bobo's mother
- Tahir Bilgiç as Habib, a member of the Sunnyvale International Brotherhood and a worker at Fat Pizza
- Paul Nakad as Sleek the Elite, a worker at Fat Pizza
- Stuart Rawe as Reg, a resident of the Sunnyvale Housing Commission, Beryl's de facto, Dazza's stepfather and later a worker at Fat Pizza
- Garry Who as Officer Garry Kock, a police officer and Richard Head's colleague
- Murray Harman as Officer Richard Head, a police officer and Garry Kock's colleague
- Rob Shehadie as Rocky, a member of the Sunnyvale International Brotherhood
- Ashur Shimon as Abdul, a member of the Sunnyvale International Brotherhood
- Maret Archer as Beryl, a resident of the Sunnyvale Housing Commission, Dazza's mother and Reg's de facto
- Jason "Jabba" Davis as Darren 'Dazza' Smith, a resident of the Sunnyvale Housing Commission and Shazza's de facto, who leaves Sunnyvale to "live the Ned Kelly life" with his Uncle Doug
- Angry Anderson as Angry, a member of the Sunnyvale Hunters and Jono's brother
- Davey Cooper as Jono, a member of the Sunnyvale Hunters and Angry's brother
- Andrew Ausage as Junior, a resident of the Sunnyvale Housing Commission (constantly demanding child support from Franky) and Cheree's de facto
- Liz Harper as Cheree, a resident of the Sunnyvale Housing Commission, Franky's ex-girlfriend and Junior's de facto
- Jimmy Jackson as Big Wheels, a resident of the Sunnyvale Housing Commission
- Renzo Bellato as Renzo, a worker at Sunnyvale Centrelink and Mama Gigliotti's nephew
- Waseem Khan as Waseem, a worker at Sunnyvale Centrelink
- John Mangos as the newsreader
- Tottie Goldsmith as Dino's girlfriend

Ara Natarian, Mohammed Hammoud and Bill Etri portray Ara, Mo and Lil' Abdul, respectively, members of the Sunnyvale International Brotherhood.

Gregory Tank, Alex Romano, Persia Blue, Trey Minty and Derek Boyer reprise their respective roles as Tank, Jimmy the Junkie, Brandine, Stalky, Ashley and Bubbles from Housos.

Brendan "Jonesy" Jones portrays Campbell Abbott, the premier of New South Wales. Nick Giannopoulos portrays a taxi driver. Sam Greco portrays Dino Falzoni, Franky's brother. Vince Sorrenti portrays a real estate agent who leases the Fat Pizza shop to Bobo and Mama. Kerser portrays a Sunnyvale rapper, and Kyle Sandilands cameos as a victim of one of Franky's thongings.

George Kapiniaris makes an uncredited cameo, reprising his role as Ronnie McDoggle in the post-credits scene. Mark Duncan, Mike Duncan and Joe June also make cameos, reprising their respective roles as Mark Tanner, Mike Tanner and Jackie Leungfeung from Swift and Shift Couriers. Additionally, Ian Turpie makes an uncredited cameo via voice recordings as Keith Warne from the aforementioned show.

== See also ==
- Pizza
- Fat Pizza
- Swift and Shift Couriers
- Housos
- Housos vs. Authority
