= Vince Sorrenti =

Australian comedian

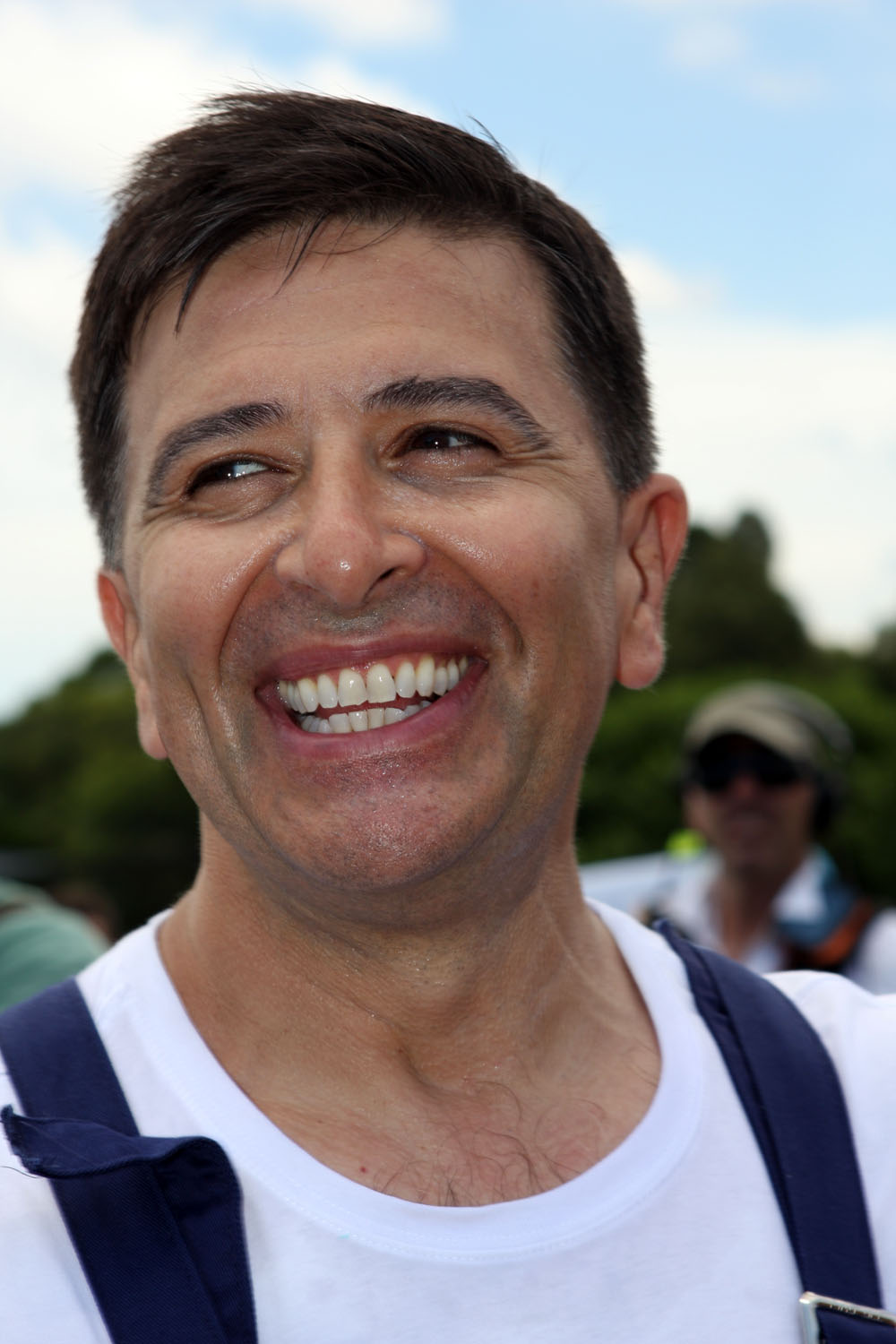
- Vince Sorrenti in January 2012
- Born: Sydney, Australia

Comedy career
- Years active: 1980s–present
- Genre: Comedy
- Subject: Humour
- Website: www.vincesorrenti.com

Vince Sorrenti is an Australian stand-up comedian, writer, and television presenter.

== Early life and education ==
Vince Sorrenti is of Italian descent, born in Sydney, New South Wales.

While studying architecture at Sydney University, before graduating in 1985, he played rugby union and featured heavily in the "Architecture Revues" over many years. It was here and at the newly-opened Sydney Comedy Store that Sorrenti cut his teeth as a performer.

== Career ==
In the late 1980s, Sorrenti lived and worked as a stand-up comic in New York City. Spotted by MTV, he became the host of the national Big Blank Show, a live variety/video show which aired nightly from Monday to Thursday. Vince Sorrenti has appeared on numerous talk shows on Australian TV over the last three decades, including Tonight Live with Steve Vizard, Russell Gilbert Live, The AFL Footy Show, and Q&A. He began hosting the Australian version of the game show Let's Make a Deal in 1990.

Between 2001 and 2007, Sorrenti appeared in several episodes as the lawyer in the comedy series Fat Pizza and the movie Fat Pizza vs. Housos, which is an Australian film based on the combination of the stories and characters of the SBS series Fat Pizza and the comedy series Housos.

In recent years he has appeared on Australian Celebrity Apprentice, Skating on Thin Ice, Wide Open Road, 20 to 1, Studio 10, and many others.

Sorrenti has co-written two films. The first was the publicly funded training film entitled No Laughing Matter (1991). It focused on global environmental sustainability, and Sorrenti played all seven characters in the film. He was nominated for awards at the Berlin and New York film festivals and was Awarded Best Training Film at Berlin Film Awards. In the same year he co-wrote with Larry Buttrose a feature film entitled Gino (1994). The screenplay was awarded full funding by the FFC (Film Finance Corporation). It received a limited release and was nominated for an AFI Award (now known as an AACTA Award) for Production Design in 1994.

Sorrenti has represented many brands over the years, including Tyreright and Allhomes.

In August 2018, Sorrenti was announced as a presenter on the new Nine Network travel series Helloworld for the first two years, which debuted on 7 October 2018. Sorrenti premiered in episode 1 as the Italy and France travel reporter.

== Controversy ==
An advertisement that Sorrenti did for Tyreright was pulled from the air after the Advertising Standards Boards deemed the characterisation of an Asian man as "racist stereotyping". In the ad, Sorrenti "explains the benefits of using Tyreright to an Asian man standing in front of what appears to be a rice field, who then asks in broken English if the process of fitting a tyre will take a ‘wong’ time".

In December 2021, Sorrenti apologised for changing a line of "That's Amore" to "When you're hit by a thug in a tough Kiwi pub, that's a Māori" on the radio station 2GB. The line elicited anger in some of the Australian Māori community, with Sorrenti saying, through an agent: "That humour is outdated and unacceptable" and that he'd be retiring the joke.

== Discography ==
=== Albums ===
Title	Details
Unbelievable!	Released: 1985; Label: CBS – SBP8190

== Awards ==
=== ARIA Music Awards ===
The ARIA Music Awards are a set of annual ceremonies presented by Australian Recording Industry Association (ARIA), which recognise excellence, innovation, and achievement across all genres of the music of Australia. They commenced in 1987.

Year	Nominee / work	Award	Result	Ref.
1987	Unbelievable	Best Comedy Release	Nominated	

=== Mo Awards ===
The Australian Entertainment Mo Awards (commonly known informally as the Mo Awards), were annual Australian entertainment industry awards. They recognise achievements in live entertainment in Australia from 1975 to 2016. Vince Sorrenti won four awards in that time.

Year	Nominee / work	Award	Result (wins only)
1994	Vince Sorrenti	New-Wave Comedy Performer of the Year	Won
1996	Vince Sorrenti	New-Wave Comedy Performer of the Year	Won
1998	Vince Sorrenti	New-Wave Comedy Performer of the Year	Won
2010	Vince Sorrenti	Rodney Rude Stand-up Performer of the Year	Won
