= Kristine Stanley =

Australian comedian, actress and producer

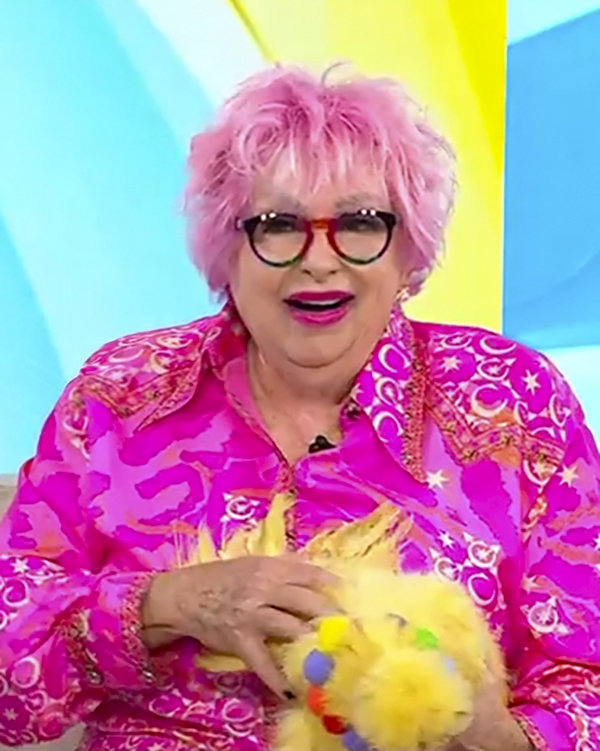
- Kristine with Lemon Chicken in 2024
- Born: Sydney, Australia
- Occupations: Comedian, actress and producer
- Years active: 1985–Present
- Spouse: John Stanley (1985–present)
- Children: 1
- Website: https://krisstanley.com.au/

Kristine Stanley also known as Krissy Stanley, is an Australian media personality, actress and producer. Best known for her animal therapy show 'Kris's Feathered Friends', in aged care facilities across Australia, featuring birds such as 'Lemon Chicken', named 'Australia's Happiest Pet' and featured on TV. Stanley has appeared both as an actress and herself on popular reality and television shows such as Better Homes and Gardens, The Living Room, Bondi Vet, Fat Pizza and The Mole.

== Career ==
As an actress Kristine has appeared in a variety of productions including feature film Two Hands and television series such as All Saints, Darradong Local Council, Housos, Fat Pizza, Fat Pizza: Back in Business and Swift and Shift Couriers. Her most notable reality TV appearance was on season 4 of The Mole.

=== Animal Therapy ===
Known locally as the 'Bird Lady' by South Sydney residents, her live bird comedy shows, Kris's Feathered Friends, feature non-toxic dyed birds, including Silkie chickens, parrots, Fantail pigeons, and rabbits. For two decades, Stanley has been running this charity show for aged care residents and hospital patients, aiming to "put colour and laughter into aged care" in response to the prevalent loneliness, isolation, and mental health issues among older Australians. Her shows have a 12-month waitlist and she has performed over 6,000 shows, bringing joy to many across Australia. Stanley's favourite moments are "when I see the big smiles on our old folks' faces when they see birds – add to that lots of laughter and fun." Stanley has appeared alongside Harry Cooper on Better Homes and Gardens, featuring Chicken therapy, and has also been featured on Bondi Vet and The Living Room with Chris Brown and her birds.

Stanley's therapy yellow silkie chicken 'Lemon Chicken' won 'Australia's happiest pet' and was featured on a billboard in Sydney. Krissy and Lemon were featured on Network 10 and Nine Network's Today show, drama unfolded as the Today Show host Karl Stefanovic who had a fear of chickens dropped Lemon Chicken, horrifying Stanley, resulting in the viral incident where Stanley yelled "Oh my god you've dropped my baby" as she slapped him on the shoulder. The incident later led Karl to humorously turn Lemon into a handbag.

=== Producer ===
Produced by Stanley and directed by Thomas Grainger, short documentary film 'Adventure before Dementia', follows Stanley's work with birds in care homes, eccentricity and hanging out with her friends such as Tziporah Malkah, Christa and Charles Billich. It was aired at Tropfest and won Best Documentary at the Sanctuary Film Festival.

=== Muse ===
Stanley was featured in 100 Pictures, 100 Stories photo series by Chrissie Hall and Deb Morgan. Her portrait has been entered in the Archibald Prize, National Photographic Portrait Prize and was a semi finalists for the HeadOn photographic Portrait Prize which was displayed at the Sydney Museum.

== Filmography ==
Year	Title	Role	Type	Notes
1967	Blind Date	Herself	Reality TV	
1985	Perfect Match	Herself	Reality TV	
1998	Hot Streak	Herself	Reality TV	
1998	Changing Rooms	Herself	Reality TV	
1999	Two Hands	Background Lady	Feature Film	
2003	All Saints	Tea Lady	Television series	1 episode
2003	The Mole	Herself	Reality TV	Season 4
2003	Today Tonight	Herself	Interview	
2003	Fat Pizza	DJBJ’S Mum and Crying Lady	Television series	1 episode
2008	Swift and Shift Couriers	Drunk Lady	Television series	1 episode
2011	Housos	Pub Patron	Television series	9 episodes
2015	Bondi Vet	Herself	Interview	
2018	Adventure Before Dementia	Herself and Producer	Short Film	
2019	Better Homes and Gardens	Herself	Interview	Chicken Therapy with Dr Harry Cooper
2019	Fat Pizza: Back in Business	Pool Lady	Television series	2 episodes
2019	The Morning Show	Herself	Interview	Krissy & Ziggy Macaw
2023	The Living Room	Herself	Interview	Chatting with Dr Chris Brown
2023	Darradong Local Council	Bronwyn Abbot	Television series	8 episodes
2024	Today	Herself	Interview	Lemon Chicken winner of Australia's Happiest Pet
2024	10 News First	Herself	Interview	Lemon Chicken winner of Australia's Happiest Pet

== Early life ==
Stanley was ill as a child and at age 5 was diagnosed with malnutrition which led to an eye condition where she lost her sight in her left eye; she grew up in a single mother household. She grew up in Camden, hated school and was expelled from Camden High School for setting fire to the lockers. Stanely's motivation to entertain comes from her hard childhood and being bullied; at the age of 7 Krissy had her first birthday party and it was the first time in her life she laughed, after that moment she thought to herself,“...I want to feel like this for the rest of my life, I want to laugh”.

Stanley started her career as a car saleswoman before featuring on reality TV in the 80's and 90s.

Stanley lives in Oyster Bay with her husband John Stanley whom she married on 7 Dec 1985 and has a son Christopher Stanley who is YouTuber Cosplay Chris.
