= Murray Harman =

Australian actor

Murray Harman is an Australian actor, best known for his role as Murray the Cop in the black comedy series Pizza and Murray Smith (an office worker and cop) Swift and Shift Couriers.

== Collection of works ==
=== Filmography ===
Year	Movie
2003	Fat Pizza
2006	Footy Legends
2013	Housos vs. Authority
2014	Fat Pizza vs. Housos

=== Television ===
- Pizza (as Murray the Cop) (2000–2007)
- All Saints (as Security Guard in S5E11 & S5E14) (2002)
- White Collar Blue (as Fireman in S2E19) (2003)
- Dangerous (as Bus Driver in S1E2) (2007)
- Swift and Shift Couriers (as Murray Smith) (2008, 2011)
- Housos (as Richard Head) (2011, 2013)
- Fat Pizza: Back in Business (as Richard Head) (2019)
