= Housos vs. Authority =

- Theatrical poster
- Directed by: Paul Fenech
- Written by: Paul Fenech
- Produced by: Paul Fenech
- Starring: Elle Dawe; Paul Fenech; Jason "Jabba" Davis; Kevin Taumata; Vanessa Davis; Tahir Bilgic; Murray Harman
- Narrated by: Russell Gilbert
- Cinematography: Michael Kliem
- Edited by: David Rudd
- Distributed by: Transmission Films; Paramount Pictures
- Release date: 1 November 2012 (Australia)
- Running time: 103 minutes
- Country: Australia
- Language: English
- Budget: $200,000
- Box office: $1,386,692

Housos vs. Authority is a 2012 Australian comedy film, based upon the stories and characters of the Housos television series, created by Paul Fenech.

The film was released to Australian cinemas on 1 November 2012, following several pre-release screenings around the country. Directed, produced and written by Fenech, the film was made for a modest budget of $200,000 and was distributed by Transmission Films. Upon release, the film was a box office success, grossing $1,386,692 throughout Australia.

== Plot ==
The movie starts with a dedication to Aussie legend Ian Turpie. Two men drive women in hummers to Sunnyvale to shoot an ad campaign which is interrupted by Sharon "Shazza" Jones (Elle Dawe) after which Franky Falzoni (Paul Fenech) starts a riot. Shazza is mad at Darren "Dazza" Smith because he has no money to pay off the fines and bills. Barry "Bazza" Jones explains that Wazza died from a heart attack caused by excessive sexual intercourse that he had with a lady he met at the races. Two coppers then bust Franky after which he runs off until the coppers run into Kevin "Kev" Takamata and Vanessa "Ness" Talawahoo. Gary and Richard find their car has been stripped by the junkies and immediately take chase.

Shazza receives a letter from her mother "Rayleen" who says she is sick and does not have much time left. Dazza interrupts an upset Shazza and she slams the window on his arm. Dazza goes to the ice rink with Franky and Kev. When he gets there Franky explains that Kylie was hit by a train when trying to tag it. After attacking the ice rink manager for illegal consumption of alcohol. Dazza realises they have a Centrelink appointment. After leaving the rink, Franky and Dazza leave Kev and the two receive food vouchers for their kids and attempt to raffle off chickens only to fail. When Franky catches up to Dazza and Kev he finds that they set up a spa bath and a barbecue. Reg receives a phone call from Rayleen saying that she lives at Ayers Rock when Shazza answers she lies at first but then hangs up in tears. Franky then robs a cafe but Dazza and Kev run into "Junior" and Franky's ex "Cheree" who take Franky's money. Before Franky can steal it back he is forced to run away when he hears the cops.

Dazza rants about Shazza's mum with Franky and Kev until they hit two coppers on push bikes. Shazza goes to see the bikies who tell her that they need to run some illegal stuff (illegal drugs and firearms) up to the Northern Territory and that she can see her mum on the condition that she brings it back. After everyone gets in the van Franky is forced to get rid of the coppers (two of which are fired for destroying the road bikes). Eventually Franky catches up with them and after a detoured trip the gang make it to the bikies hideout only to find a letter that they are busy. The gang reaches Shazza's mother's house but only Shazza and Vanessa go in. After Rayleen explains that she committed 18 acts of fraud to pay of Wazza's debts Vanessa goes outside where Franky is tormenting the animals and eventually pecked by an angry emu. Rayleen then dies and a devastated Shazza comes out bawling.

The housos attempt to gain access to the rock only to be denied due to failure to pay the entry fee. They then break in and Franky goes to deface the rock while Kev, Vanessa, Dazza and Shazza have an orgy until they are arrested by the fired cops. The former Mayor of Sunnyvale "Simon Abbott" is elected into federal parliament but his live interview is interrupted by the news that four of the housos got arrested for breaking into Uluru. When they get to court Shazza explains that they were only committing the act of a true Aussie and are let off with a warning. On the way back to Sunnyvale the housos deliver the stuff to the Alice chapter and then run into Franky who refuses to say anything related to what happened with him.

Simon convinces the prime minister to re arrest the housos who appear in the Supreme Court in Canberra. Johnno the dwarf bikie acts as their lawyer until he attempts to commit an act of contempt after the judge tells him he is not allowed to smoke or drink in court. After multiple arguments Franky tells the story of what happened in the bush and explains that he snuck into an army base which was American land. Franky then explains that aliens gave him an anal probe. After the judge continuously asks Franky to remove his hat, he loses it and attempts to thong the judge. Shazza then commits an act of contempt of court and the housos are given ten years until that night A Current Affair plays the footage and re edits it leaving all the Sunnyvale housing commission residents disgusted. Simon is forced by an angry prime minister to let the housos free or he will be fired. The whole of Sunnyvale has a party until Junior and Franky's ex Cheree show up demanding money for child support. Franky refuses which starts a riot until the coppers show up after which the riot is taken out on them.

Shazza and Dazza return to Ayers Rock and spread Rayleen's ashes after which Dazza accidentally snorts them leaving Shazza disgusted.

== Cast ==
- Elle Dawe as Shazza Jones
- Jason "Jabba" Davis as Dazza Smith
- Paul Fenech as Franky Falzoni
- Kevin Taumata as Kevin Takamata
- Vanessa Davis as Vanessa Talawahoo
- Russell Gilbert as Bazza Jones
- Alex Romano as Jimmy the Junkie
- Ashur Simon as Abdul
- Tahir Bilgic as Habib
- Rob Shehadie as Rocky
- Andrew Ausage as Junior
- Liz Harper as Cheree
- Derek Boyer as Bubbles
- Jioji Ravulo as Muli
- Angry Anderson as Angry the Bikie
- Davey Cooper as Johnno
- Maret Archer as Beryl Smith
- Stuart Rawe as Reg
- Garry Who as Constable Garry Kock
- Murray Harman as Constable Richard Head
- Ara Natarian as Ara
- Mohammed Hammoud as Mo
- Mark "Chopper" Read as Dazza's Dad
- Phillip Scott as Senator
- Melissa Bell as Model
- George Kapiniaris as Stylist

== Reception ==
Housos vs. Authority has a 67% approval rating on Rotten Tomatoes (based on 6 reviews). Luke Buckmaster of In Film Australia wrote "Paul Fenech has been lobbing comedy grenades for eons. Whether he intended it or not, his latest movie is one of Australia's most brutal satires of lower class suburbia", while 3AW's Jim Schembri wrote "very faithful, very funny, very crass big-screen version of [the] brilliantly low-brow TV series[...] as far as a film doing justice to the TV show on which it is based, Housos vs Authority leaves the abomination of Kath & Kimderella for dead." However, reviews haven't been wholly positive for the film. For example, Matthew Toomey of ABC Radio Brisbane wrote "The tiresome nature of the comedy wears thin very quickly. It's the same easy jokes over and over again".

== Sequel ==
Fat Pizza vs. Housos is a crossover film bringing together the eponymous series Housos and Fat Pizza, itself a spin-off of television series Pizza, which was released on 27 November 2014.

== See also ==
- List of Australian films
- Swift and Shift Couriers
