= Kevin Taumata =

New Zealander-Australian actor

- Born: Hastings, New Zealand
- Occupations: Film and television actor
- Years active: 1999–present

Kevin James Taumata is a Māori New Zealander Australian film and television actor.

== Television career ==
Taumata moved with his family to the Inner West of Sydney at the age of 8. He began his acting career at the age of 14 obtaining work as an extra on Heartbreak High.

In 1999, he landed a role on Nine Network's Murder Call.

He has featured prominently in the SBS television series Fat Pizza, Swift & Shift Couriers and Housos.

In 2014, he starred in the comedy reality television series Bogan Hunters on Seven Network's 7mate, as "Kev the Kiwi".

In 2019, he starred in the sixth season of the popular sitcom Fat Pizza, entitled "Fat Pizza: Back in Business" on Seven Network's 7mate.

When Housos won the Logie Award for Most Outstanding Light Entertainment Program in 2014, Taumata was with the show's director Paul Fenech to accept the award in Melbourne. As a nod to bogandom, they both wore jeans, suit jackets covered in tattoo designs, and thongs.

== Filmography ==
Early in his career, Taumata was featured in the 1999 movie Kick as a fullback.

Later, he portrayed the popular character Kev the Kiwi in the feature films Housos vs. Authority (2012) and Fat Pizza vs. Housos (2014).
