= Persia Blue =

Australian actress

Persia Blue (born Persia Blue Victoria Toll) is an Australian actress of both screen and stage.

Blue graduated in performing arts from Ensemble Studios, Australia. Blue also studied Practical Aesthetics (PA) at Atlantic Acting School, New York City. After completing drama school her first audition was for Home and Away, she was successfully cast as the character of Zoe Nash. She also made a guest appearance on ABC's Dance Academy series 2. Blue was cast as the character of Brandine in the second season of SBS's television comedy Housos, which won the 2014 Silver Logie for Most Outstanding Light Entertainment Program. Blue was a member of the actors' company for the Hayes Gordon Repertory Theatre Company. She travelled NSW, Australia performing Shakespeare for the Theatre In Education (T.I.E) Tour. Blue has played leading roles in Sydney independent theatre including Operating Theatre's production of Graceland and Asleep on the Wind by Ellen Byron. Other theatre credits include David Williamson's The Jack Manning Trilogy : Charitable Intent, for Ensemble Theatre.

Persia Blue won the Dame Joan Sutherland Fund's 2016 Cultural Exchange Grant for Emerging Australian Artists in the field of theatre. The DJSF Grant was for artistic development in New York.
