= Vanessa Davis (actress) =

Australian actress

- Education: Musical Theatre degree, Australian Institute of Music
- Occupation: Actress
- Years active: 2011–present
- Notable credit(s): Housos TV series and films

Vanessa Davis is an Australian actress known for her roles in the Housos television series and movies. She studied for a degree in musical theatre at the Australian Institute of Music.

== Filmography ==
=== Film ===
- Hatfield and McCoy (2012)
- Housos vs. Authority (2012)
- Fat Pizza vs. Housos (2014)
- Dumb Criminals: The Movie (2015)
- Tough & Cookie (short) (2015)
- Fat Pizza vs. Housos Live (2016)

=== Television ===
- Housos (2011–2013)
- Fat Pizza: Back In Business
- Housos vs Virus (2020)

=== Stage ===
- Housos Live on Stage (2014)
