= Amanda Keller =

Australian radio host

Amanda Keller OAM
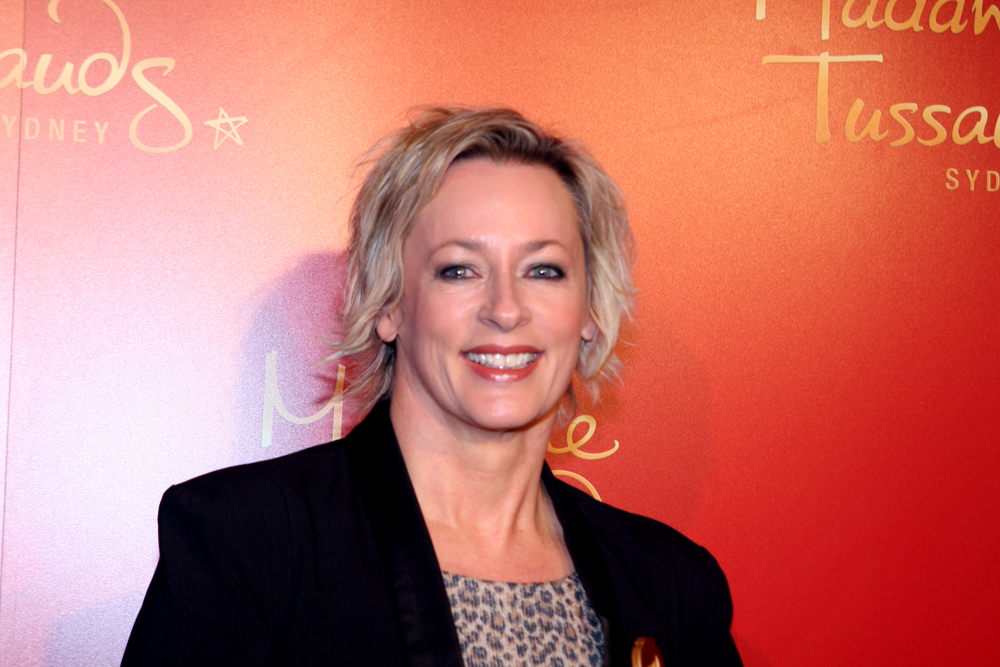
- Amanda Keller in 2012
- Born: Amanda Rose Keller; 1961 or 1962; Sydney, New South Wales, Australia
- Education: Carlingford High School; Mitchell College of Advanced Education
- Occupations: Television and radio presenter; comedian; writer; actress; journalist; media personality
- Years active: 1982–present
- Employer: Gold Network
- Known for: Beyond Tomorrow; The Living Room; Dancing with the Stars
- Spouse: Harley Oliver (m. 1989)
- Children: 2

Amanda Rose Keller (born 1961 or 1962) is an Australian television and radio presenter, writer, actress, journalist, and media personality, best known as the hostess of the popular Australian lifestyle program The Living Room. Keller also co-hosts Jonesy & Amanda with Brendan Jones on the Gold Network since 2003.

== Early life and education ==
Keller was born in 1961 or 1962.

She attended Carlingford High School and Mitchell College of Advanced Education (now Charles Sturt University), where she graduated with a Bachelor of Arts in communications in 1982. At university, she was a contemporary of Andrew Denton among others, and was a student of Peter Temple. She was a broadcaster with on-campus community radio station 2MCE-FM.

== Career ==
Keller’s first professional media job was in 1983 as a researcher for the popular children's television show, Simon Townsend's Wonder World!. She was later a researcher and producer for Good Morning Australia when Gordon Elliott and Kerri-Anne Kennerley were hosts. By 1985, she was a researcher and producer for Ray Martin's Midday show, where she first began to appear regularly on camera.

In 1987, she left Midday to appear in the pilot for Richard Neville's counter-culture programme Extra Dimensions, which was produced by the same team that made Beyond 2000. Extra Dimensions folded after the first season. Keller's luck changed when she was signed to Beyond 2000, the internationally popular science programme.

In 1994, she joined Andrew Denton as a regular guest on his show Denton, where she combined her scientific knowledge with her love of popular culture and kitsch—subsequently publishing a book, Amanda's Handy Home Hints. When the series finished in 1995, she joined Denton at Sydney radio station Triple M where they co-presented the breakfast show. At the same time, she hosted her own contemporary culture show on cable television called The Hub.

She hosted her own pop culture-centric program Mondo Thingo in 2004. In 2006, Keller appeared in Series Five of Dancing with the Stars, where she progressed to the fifth round before being eliminated.

In 2008, she starred in the SBS TV series Swift and Shift Couriers as Amanda Doyle, the regional manager, and returned to this role for season two in 2011. Also, in 2011, she had a small role in another sitcom, Housos, also on SBS TV.

In 2009 for the duration of the show Keller was the Baby Boomers team leader on Network Ten's quiz show Talkin' 'Bout Your Generation. The show began airing in 2009 and finished its fourth season in 2012.

In 2017 she became one of the highest paid women in Australian radio. Also in that same year, she made a cameo appearance as a news reporter in episode 7547 of The Bold and the Beautiful alongside Brendan Jones and Ita Buttrose.

In 2019, Keller started co-hosting Dancing with the Stars with Grant Denyer.

She has also made appearances on shows such as Good News Week, Rove Live, The Glass House, 20 to 1, Spicks and Specks, All Star Family Feud, The Project, Studio 10, Show Me the Movie!, Have You Been Paying Attention? and Hughesy, We Have a Problem.

On 18 July 2024, Keller was named for ABC factual series The Role of a Lifetime. She was the host on the first Australian series of The Piano (2025).

== Recognition and honours ==
Keller won numerous media awards for her work on Beyond 2000, including the United Nations Association of Australia's Media Peace Award in 1989, and the Michael Daley Award for Science Journalism.

In 2016 she was awarded the Medal of the Order of Australia (OAM) in the Queens Birthday Honours

She was inducted into the Australian Commercial Radio Hall of Fame in 2017.

== Personal life ==
Keller supports the Sydney Roosters rugby league team in the Australian National Rugby League.

She has two adult sons with her husband Harley Oliver, and as of 2022 lives in the Sydney seaside suburb of Coogee.

== Other activities ==
Keller holds the world record for the longest underwater radio broadcast, which took place on 28 October 2010 when she and fellow WSFM breakfast show host Brendan Jones spent over three hours underwater at Sydney Aquarium.

She is the patron of the Sydney Kids Committee, a volunteer organisation which raises funds for the Sydney Children's Hospital.

== Bibliography ==
- Amanda's handy hints : an off-the-wall guide to surviving the nineties. Ringwood, Victoria: Penguin. 1995. ISBN 978-0140253771.
- Natural born Keller : my life and other palaver. Crows Nest, New South Wales: Allen and Unwin. 2015. ISBN 9781743316177.

and contributed with co host Brendan Jones to

- Laugh Even Louder!. Gosford, New South Wales: Scholastic Australia Pty Limited. 2007. ISBN 978-1-74169-022-4.
