= Mondo Thingo =

2004 Australian television show

- Presented by: Amanda Keller
- Theme music composer: Michael Lira
- Country of origin: Australia
- Original language: English
- No. of seasons: 1
- No. of episodes: 37

Original release
- Release: 11 February – 11 November 2004

Mondo Thingo was an Australian pop culture television show which aired for 37 episodes on the Australian Broadcasting Corporation in 2004.

The show was presented by Amanda Keller, with regular appearances by Steve Cannane and Robbie Buck (from the ABC's Triple J radio station). The series irreverently covered elements of popular culture, including movies, music, internet, fashion and marketing – or in Keller's words, "the soft underbelly of pop culture".

The program was generally well received by viewers, but critical opinion was somewhat polarised: a Sydney Morning Herald team compiling the newspaper's 2004 "Couch Potato" Awards was divided between those who found the program annoying, and those who found it well-written and entertaining. Some critics also decried that several of the ABC's arts programs were axed to make way for broader, more populist material such as Mondo Thingo.
