= Garry Who =

Australian comedian

- Born: Garry John Weston; 1 May 1954 (age 72); Sydney, New South Wales, Australia
- Occupations: Comedian, actor
- Years active: 1980–present

Garry Who (born Garry John Weston; 1 May 1954) is an Australian actor and comedian, best known for his role as Doug Stevens in the Australian sitcom All Together Now.

== Early life and education ==
Garry Who was born Garry John Weston on 1 May 1954 in Sydney, New South Wales.

He grew up in Maitland, and went to Maitland High School. After he finished school, he moved back to his home town to start his career.

== Career ==
Beginning his working life as a signwriter, Who began his career in the mid-70s as a stand-up comedian. He rose to prominence in the early 1980s at the original Sydney Comedy Store. In the late 1980s he began to feature on film and television.

His biggest role to date was portraying Doug Stevens in the 90's hit All Together Now. He has also appeared in A Country Practice, Pizza, Swift and Shift Couriers, Water Rats, The Hollowmen, and Housos.

== Discography ==
- 1987 Life’s Just A Routine

== Filmography ==
=== Film ===
Year	Title	Role	Type
1984	On the Loose	Cane Toad	Feature film
1985	Emoh Ruo	Policeman	Feature film
1986	The Blue Lightning	Mechanic	Feature film
1986	Fair Game	Sparks	Feature film
1986	Dead End Drive-In	Drive-In Cop	Feature film
1989	Candy Regentag	Can You Feel It	Feature film
1999	Close Contact	George	TV movie
2003	You Can't Stop the Murders	Trevor	Feature film
2011	Up the Aisle	Gary	
2012	Housos vs. Authority	Constable Garry Kock	Feature film
2013	The Brothel	Garry Who	
2014	Fat Pizza vs. Housos	Constable Garry Kock	Feature film
2015	Dumb Criminals: The Movie	Detective Garry	

=== Television ===
Year	Title	Role	Type
1985	A Country Practice	Spanner Dooley	TV series, 2 episodes
1989	E Street	Yetti	TV series, season 1, episode 32: "Aftermath Part 1"
1988–89	Just for the Record	Reporter	TV series
1989–95	Midday	Resident comedian	TV series
1991–93	All Together Now	Doug Stevens	TV series, 76 episodes
1996	G.P.	Jason Powell	TV series, season 8, episode 12: "Will You Still Love Me Tomorrow"
1997	Big Sky	Ivan	TV series, season 1, episode 36: "The Choice"
1997	Headliners	Self	TV series
1998	Water Rats	John Lynch	TV series, season 3, episode 24: "Switch Back"
2003–07	Pizza	Lifesaver Les / Aussie / Gold Guy	TV series, 4 episodes
2008	The Hollowmen	Real Estate Agent	TV series, season 1, episode 6: "A Housing Crisis"
2008	Swift and Shift Couriers	Gary Hibbett	TV series, season 1, episode 8: "The Safety Inspector"
2009	All Saints	Jim Patterson	TV series, season 12, episode 7: "Awake in Fright"
2011–22	Housos: The Thong Warrior	Constable Garry Kock	TV series, 13 episodes
2014	Town Centre	Cameron	TV series
2019–21	Fat Pizza: Back in Business	Constable Garry Kock	TV series, 10 episodes
2023	Darradong Local Council	Garry McDuffy	TV series, 9 episodes
