= Bogan Hunters =

Australian television series

- Genre: Documentary comedy
- Presented by: Paul Fenech
- Opening theme: "Bogan Hunters" by Heaven the Axe
- Country of origin: Australia
- Original language: English
- No. of seasons: 1
- No. of episodes: 10

Production
- Running time: 30 minutes (inc.adverts)

Original release
- Network: 7mate (Australia); TV2 (New Zealand)
- Release: 13 May – 15 July 2014

Bogan Hunters is an Australian comedy reality television series created by Paul Fenech for Seven Network's 7mate. The series provides an in-depth look into Australia's bogan subculture, as the Bogan Hunters traverse the nation looking for Australia's greatest bogan. The show first aired on Australia's 7mate on 13 May 2014 and on New Zealand's TV2 on 14 October 2014. The finale of season 1 aired on 15 July 2014 in Australia and on 9 December 2014 in New Zealand.

On 8 February 2015, two Bogan Hunters specials aired titled "Summernats And The Hunt For The Great Aussie Hoon" and "Bathurst Conspiracy".

== Overview ==
The show follows the adventures of 'boganologist' Paul 'Pauly' Fenech, Shazza (Elle Dawe) and Kev the Kiwi (Kevin Taumata) as they travel around Australia in search of the nation's greatest bogan, tapping into a growing interest and fascination in Australia's unique version of the subculture. Their quest takes them to all of Australia's states and territories, except for the ACT, revealing the diversity of bogan culture throughout the nation. After searching in many regions with significant bogan populations, seven of the finest bogans down under are selected by a panel of eight celebrity judges to compete in a Bogan Grand Final in Sydney, where criteria such as appearance, attitude and sex appeal are measured. The winners of the 2014 showdown are granted a "Golden Thong Award", and a beer keg laden "Aussie pride 'Straya' ute" or a makeover. Series 1 focused on suburban bogans, located about 20 minutes drive from the center of Australia's largest cities.

Many of the shows' main characters and judges have previously appeared in the SBS television series Pizza, Swift and Shift Couriers and Housos.

== Outcomes ==
=== Tasmania ===
Tasmania was named the 'bogan capital of Australia' with Taswegians earning four spots in the final. On the island of Tasmania, half the population has literacy and/or numeracy difficulties, and the unemployment rate is higher than it is in mainland Australia.

The producers of Bogan Hunters wanted to interview Bertrant Cadert, the Mayor of the Municipality of Glamorgan Spring Bay about the controversy surrounding the word bogan, after he labeled the residents of Triabunna as "the most bogan of bogans" using the word in a derogatory sense. Cadert declined the interview.

The show has become a part of Tasmanian culture, with "Bogan Hunters" being the 11th most popular search term on Google in 2014 for users from Tasmania.

=== Australian culture ===
The show, while light hearted and presented in a comedic fashion, accurately documents the widespread extent and manifestations of the real bogan culture in Australia.

There is no pretence, you are what you are, it's a very honest way of living. You don't try to be what you're not. A lot of bogans (who) have had hard knocks in life are still smiling. To me that taps into the best part of Australian character — the humour, the honesty, the ability to laugh at ourselves.

— Paul Fenech, News Limited.

=== Fat Pizza vs. Housos ===
Some of the show's finalists appeared in the 2014 motion picture Fat Pizza vs. Housos, which began showing in Australian cinemas on 27 November 2014.

== Production ==
When asked about the production of the series and if the participants were enthusiastic about the project, producer Paul Fenech stated:

There are people who do classify themselves as bogans so I thought it would be a laugh because a lot of them are great characters. There's an optimism and an honesty and there's a real bogan culture and they seem cool with it. Sometimes we would drive to a suburb, get out and we'd be flocked by a range of different bogans. And then we'd just find the most obvious bogan and follow them around. There's maybe 2 per cent jokes in the show … and the rest of it is all real.

— Paul Fenech, Sydney Morning Herald.

== Reviews ==
The show was praised by critics such as Scott Ellis and Louise Rugendyke from The Sydney Morning Herald's "The Guide". They have speculated that some of the characters could use a little more help than is afforded to them, highlighting the importance of shining the spotlight on them.

== Reception ==
The 9:30pm premiere of Bogan Hunters on 7mate rated 390,000 mainland capital city viewers and 589,000 viewers Australia wide, making it the highest-rating entertainment program ever to screen on the three-year-old digital channel and the second highest rating show to date. It led in multichannel ratings for the night, far ahead of shows such as Parenthood on Seven Network's primary channel. The second episode was slightly higher with 393,000 mainland capital city viewers, and was also the night's highest rating program on a multichannel.

Season 1 of Bogan Hunters enjoyed more viewers than many other Australian comedies of its era, such as the ABC's Jonah from Tonga, which later screened on HBO in the United States and BBC Three in the United Kingdom.

=== Season 1 (2014) ===
No.	Original air	Multichannel Ranking (Australia)	Australian viewers
1	13 May 2014	1	589,000
2	20 May 2014	1	554,000
3	27 May 2014	1	321,000
4	3 June 2014	1	341,000
5	10 June 2014	15	247,000
6	17 June 2014	< 20	193,000
7	24 June 2014	15	248,000
8	1 July 2014	< 20	191,000
9	8 July 2014	2	325,000
10	15 July 2014	9	232,000

== Series overview ==
Season	Episodes	Originally aired		iTunes release	DVD release	DVD features
Season	Episodes	Season premiere	Season finale	+ New unreleased footage	Region 4	+
1	10	13 May 2014	15 July 2014	15 July 2014	17 July 2014	2 Discs; Raw and Uncut; Running time: 244 minutes; Extras; Over 25 minutes of additional mini episodes

== Episodes ==
=== Season 1 (2014) ===
No.	Title	Directed by	Original release date	Consolidated Australian viewers (Mainland Capitals)
1	"Episode 1"	Paul Fenech	13 May 2014	
Seasoned boganologist Pauly Fenech, bogan translator Shazza Jones and security leader (and NZ beer drinking champion) Kev the Kiwi begin their search for Australia's greatest bogan at Western Australia's Powercruise event at the Perth Motorplex where they encounter examples of the "cashed-up bogan" or cub. Later, they head to southern Tasmania, where they discover the phrase 'obeastie', a recent addition the Australian vernacular. The episode also features a stop at the Ned Kelly museum in Glenrowan, VIC.
2	"Episode 2"	Paul Fenech	20 May 2014	
The Bogan hunters travel to George Town, Tasmania, and then to Fremantle, WA where they visit bogan icon Bon Scott's grave and encounter a group of Bogan Bikers. Finally they travel to a popular Logan Bogan hangout spot, a pub in Logan, Southern Queensland where a game of thongs is used to settle a dispute.
3	"Episode 3"	Paul Fenech	27 May 2014	
The Bogan hunters continue their search, playing wheel of goon in Nar Nar Goon, VIC, and looking for "remote area bogans" to no avail near Stonor, TAS. Later the hunters split up, with Shazza making an important stop at Holden's soon to be closed Elizabeth factory, and Pauly and Kev attending the King of the Ring Fight in Darwin, NT and performing burnouts inside a Fannie Bay living room.
4	"Episode 4"	Paul Fenech	3 June 2014	
The Bogan hunters' quest takes them to New South Wales, Queensland, Victoria and South Australia. Shazza does her first burnout in a flanno covered car, visits the Big Merino and the team investigates rumors of a two headed bogan in the Tasmanian wilderness.
5	"Episode 5"	Paul Fenech	10 June 2014	
Davey Cooper joins Pauly and Kev for a look around the Salisbury and Elizabeth areas of Adelaide, SA. In Brahma Lodge, the hunters attend a Cold Chisel tribute concert. Later the crew returns to the Northern Territory, where they meet the thong throwing champion of Darwin at the Corroboree Park Tavern. Kev loses against Pauly in a fishing contest, resulting in two penalties, firstly to be covered in snakes and secondly to go for a dunk with a large crocodile while inside a perspex tank.
6	"Episode 6"	Paul Fenech	17 June 2014	
The hunt continues with the team hanging out in Ravenswood, Tasmania, and meeting with a bogan imposter in Queensland. Later, Shazza gets to give her first ever homejob tattoo to a mother in St Helens, TAS.
7	"Episode 7"	Paul Fenech	24 June 2014	
The hunters meet a crazy and sometimes naked Western Australian contender in Rockingham, a bogan who lives in a Holden vehicle and the crew visit One Mile Hotel in Ipswich, QLD to report on an officially registered sport - jelly wrestling.
8	"Episode 8"	Paul Fenech	1 July 2014	
The Bogan Hunters recap on the highlights of their trip and the seven finalists found during their quest are revealed.
9	"Episode 9"	Paul Fenech	8 July 2014	
Seven of the judges' favourite bogans compete for the esteemed title of 'Australia's Greatest Bogan' in a Grand Final event held in Sydney, NSW.
10	"Episode 10"	Paul Fenech	15 July 2014	
After almost enjoying a pie from Harry's Cafe de Wheels, the winners of the title of 'Australia's Greatest Bogan' are presented with the keys to the "Aussie pride 'Straya' ute" with beer kegs in the back, while the winners of the Best Bogan Female Award and the Overall Points Winner are invited to receive a complimentary 48-hour make over conducted by Henry Roth, complete with etiquette lessons from June Dally-Watkins and dental treatment from Haoey Dental.

== Cast and characters ==
=== Main ===
- Paul Fenech as Pauly
- Elle Dawe as Shazza Jones
- Kevin Taumata as Kev the Kiwi

=== Celebrity Judges ===
- Angry Anderson as himself
- Jonesy as himself
- Amarli Inez as Miss Nude Australia
- Tahir Bilgiç as himself
- Mick Gatto as himself
- Mark "Jacko" Jackson as himself
- Chris Franklin as himself
- Derek Boyer as himself
- Rob Shehadie as himself
- Guy Sebastian as himself

=== Other ===
- Davey Cooper as himself
- Jimmy Jackson as James aka Big Wheels
- June Dally-Watkins as herself
- Henry Roth as himself
- Martin Miller as Marty the Engineer
- Alex Romano as Jimmy

== International broadcasting ==
Country	Network(s)/Station(s)
Australia (origin)	7mate
New Zealand	TV2

== See also ==
- Bogan
- Housos
- Fat Pizza vs. Housos
- Culture of Australia
- Television in Australia
