= Heaven the Axe =

Heavy metal band

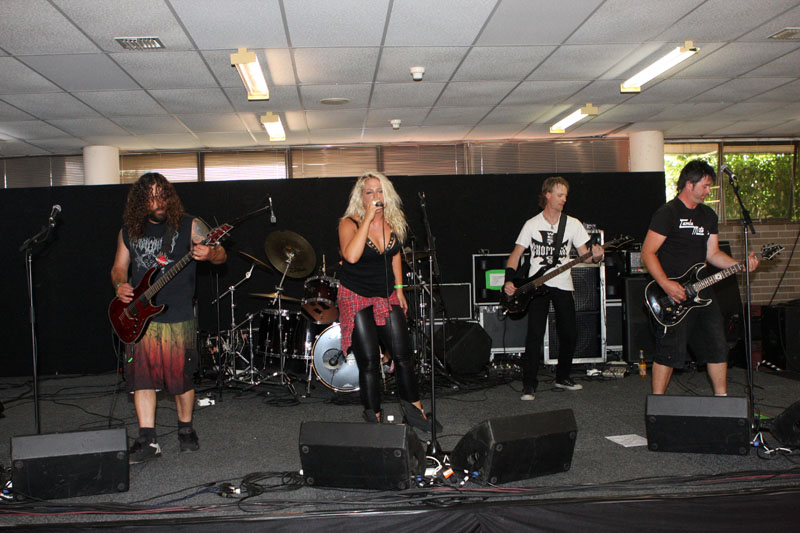

Background information
- Origin: Wagga Wagga, New South Wales, Australia
- Genres: Pub rock; hard rock; heavy metal; rock and roll
- Years active: 2007–present
- Label: Melbourne
- Members: Phoebe Pinnock; Steve Watts
- Website: heaventheaxe.com

Heaven the Axe is a heavy metal band, which formed in Wagga Wagga in 2007 by Phoebe Pinnock on lead vocals and her husband, Steve Watts, on rhythm guitar.

== History ==
Heaven the Axe began as a duo of domestic partners, Phoebe Pinnock on lead vocals and Steve Watts (ex-Manticore) on rhythm guitar in Wagga Wagga. After the couple moved to Melbourne they were joined by Matt "Skitz" Sanders (Drummer; Damaged, Terrorust) with accompaniment by Nick Williams (Rotten Chop) on bass. Phoebe, Steve and Skitz recorded two songs "So Nirvana" and "Glue" with Ren Parisi from Melbourne Records. Recruiting live members Paolo Celli and Retch Bile (Broozer) they played their first show in October 2009 at Noise Bar, Brunswick.

The band did a series of fundraising efforts in 2010 raising money for victims of child sex slavery in Nepal. Celli and Bile left and drummer Tom Rossell (House of Thumbs) and Mat Silcock (Former Damaged Guitarist) replaced them. Tim Aldridge (Abramelin) joined handling bass and the band began playing with two guitarists. Heaven the Axe were invited to perform at The Sydney Entertainment Centre in a televised performance which led to their booking at Street Machines Summernats Festival in Canberra in 2011. They have since appeared there in 2012 and 2014.

Heaven the Axe launched their debut record "Sex, Chugs and Rock ‘n’ Roll" independently on 17 September 2011 at The Palace Theatre in Melbourne City. Aramis Pitrinec (Strict Vincent) signed on as drummer also sharing the role with Rossell and Skitz. After the band recorded the album Aldridge left and was replaced by Trav Price. During November 2011 the band did a tour as main support for Rose Tattoo. The band toured through 2012 and Phoebe and Steve coordinated a festival in their hometown of Wagga Wagga featuring Angry Anderson singing Rose Tattoo songs with Heaven The Axe as his band, as well as Justice Crew and international super cross riders in a display of motorcycling stunts. They raised $50,000 in a day for their local community and attracted national attention in the media.

In 2013, the band teamed up with Frankenbok, Dreadnaught, Abreact and King Parrot to tour regional areas in a blind line up draw tour called "Regional Roulette". Heaven the Axe recorded the single "Good Things Come to Those Who Hate" in 2013 with Peter "Regi" Bowman and the song featured backing vocalists Skitz, Dan McDougall (Frankenbok) and Matt Young (King Parrot) with a guitar solo by Richie Poate (Dreadnaught). The song went to #2 on the Australian iTunes Metal charts. After Summernats 2014 Mat Silcock left and Aramis Pitrinec moved to Queensland. Ed Lacey (The Wolves, King Parrot, The Berzerker) joined on guitar and Adam Savino (Decimatus) became the new drummer. In 2014 Heaven the Axe wrote and recorded the theme song to 7mate programme, Bogan Hunters, which is directed and produced by Pauly Fenech. The group's music was used on the soundtracks to SBS TV series, Housos (Series 2) and the related feature film, Housos VS Authority. The band also wrote and recorded a theme song for the film, Fat Pizza VS Housos.

Lacey and Savino both quit in December 2014 immediately before the band was invited to perform Hammersonic Festival in Jakarta, Indonesia for 2015. Phoebe and Steve re-joined with Matt "Skitz" Sanders and Tom Rossell on drums and invited Aaron Butler "Azza Bok" and Tim Miedecke both from Frankenbok to join the band and in 2015 they played to 30,000 fans in Jakarta. In 2015 the band has headlined a number of Australian Festivals including Brewtality Festival, at The Tote. Heaven the Axe started writing their new record. They went into hiatus late in that year.

In August 2016 the group reassembled with the line-up of Pinnock, Savino and Watts joined by Ben Gilmore on bass guitar and Alex Hellenbach on lead guitar. Brian Giffin of Loud magazine observed, "New blood also gives [the duo] more people to bounce song ideas off; Hellenbach in particular has been keen to step forward with a few of his own." They started touring through Victoria, New South Wales and Australian Capital Territory in that month.

== Discography ==
=== Albums ===
- 2011 – "Sex, Chugs & Rock ‘N’ Roll"

=== Singles ===
- 2013 – "Good Things Come To Those Who Hate"
- 2014 – "Bogan Hunters"

== See also ==
- Timeline of trends in Australian music
- Bogan Hunters
