= Paul Fenech =

Australian film director

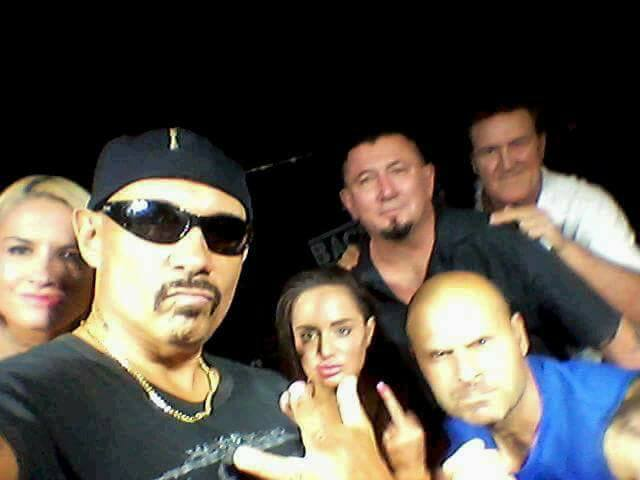
- Paul Fenech on left in 2017
- Born: Paul Fenech; 21 November 1972 (age 53); Sydney, New South Wales, Australia
- Occupations: Filmmaker, film and television actor, director, producer and writer
- Years active: 1995–present

Paul Fenech (born 21 November 1972) is an Australian filmmaker, film and television actor, director, producer and writer. He is best known for writing, directing, producing and starring in the television series Pizza, Swift and Shift Couriers, Housos, Bogan Hunters, Fat Pizza: Back in Business, Housos vs. Virus: The Lockdown and Darradong Local Council as well as the motion pictures Fat Pizza (2003), Housos vs. Authority (2012), Fat Pizza vs. Housos (2014) and Dumb Criminals: The Movie (2015).

== Career ==
Early in his career, Fenech directed More Than Legends, a documentary highlighting Aboriginal culture through the eyes of elders from the Nyungar (W.A.), Arrernte (N.T.) and Tiwi (N.T.) groups.

He first achieved prominence by winning third place in Sydney's annual Tropfest short film festival in 1995 for a biographical short entitled Pizza Man based on his experiences as a pizza delivery driver. He won the Tropfest award for best film in 1998 for Intolerance written by and starring Acclaimed Australian Comedy Superstar Austen Tayshus, although he had submitted the film under the pseudonym Laura Feinstein to appeal to the sensitivities of the judges, particularly Tropfest founder John Polson, who hoped that a female director would win the award.

His first feature film was Somewhere in the Darkness, a surreal tale about an old Irish man, a young boy and a third, cynical man who attempt to pass time whilst trapped underneath rubble when a shopping complex is destroyed.

Fenech was then able to secure a deal with Australian community broadcaster SBS to produce a sitcom based on Pizza Man. Entitled Pizza, and premiering in 2000, it ran for five seasons, with the final season airing in 2007. A full-length motion picture based on the series entitled Fat Pizza was released in 2003. Over a decade later, Fenech combined the storyline of Pizza with that of his third SBS Series Housos to create the feature film Fat Pizza vs. Housos.

Following the success of Pizza, he created the sitcom series Swift and Shift Couriers. Series 1 began airing on SBS on 27 October 2008 and Series 2 premiered on 15 August 2011.

His third television show for SBS, Housos, first aired on 24 October 2011. To date, two series have been produced, in addition to two full-length, cinematically-released motion pictures, Housos vs. Authority (2012) and Fat Pizza vs. Housos (2014). Housos won the award for Most Outstanding Light Entertainment Program at the 2014 Logie Awards.

Fenech's program Bogan Hunters, a combination of comedy and reality television, began airing on 13 May 2014 on 7mate and was the channel's highest-rating entertainment program and second highest rating show to date.

Fenech has recently re-started his shows Fat Pizza and Housos on the 7 Network, after his deal with SBS was not renewed. These shows are under variations of the original name, both called, Housos Vs. Virus: The Lockdown and Fat Pizza: Back in Business. These spin-off shows star Fenech playing the same characters as he did in the original shows and most of the original cast, however the shows are far less lewd than their SBS filmed counterparts, with far more reference to touchy social issues such as the COVID-19 pandemic and a lot more nudity and swearing. These shows, airing on 5 November 2019 for Fat Pizza: Back in Business and the 26 October 2020 for Housos Vs Virus: The Lockdown have proven successful with consistently high ratings online.

== Filmography ==
Feature films
Year	Title	Credit	Role	Notes
2020	The Very Excellent Mr. Dundee		Emilio (Gardener)	
2018	That's Not My Dog!		Himself	
2015	Dumb Criminals: The Movie	Director, writer, producer and executive producer	Rabbit	
2014	Fat Pizza vs. Housos	Director, writer, producer and executive producer	Franky Falzoni/Pauly Falzoni	
2012	Housos vs. Authority	Director, writer, producer and editor	Franky Falzoni	
2003	Fat Pizza	Director, writer and producer	Pauly Falzoni/Alfredo Falzoni	
1999	Somewhere in the Darkness	Director, writer and producer	Lawnmower Man	
Television
Year	Title	Credit	Role	Notes
2023	Darradong Local Council	Creator, director, writer and producer	Sam 'Fox' Foxitini	9 episodes
2022	SAS Australia: Who Dares Wins	Contestant	Himself	9 episodes
2018	Deadly Down Under	Presenter, Creator	Pauly	10 episodes
2018	Drunk History Australia		Jesse Dowson	Pilot
2015	Dumb Criminals Motorcycle Club	Creator, director, writer and producer	Rabbit	
2015	Summernats and the Hunt for the Great Aussie Hoon		Pauly	TV movie
2014	Bogan Hunters	Creator, director, writer and producer	Host	10 episodes
2013	Celebrity Splash!	Contestant	Himself	
2011–2013; 2020–2022	Housos / Housos vs Virus: The Lockdown / Housos: The Thong Warrior	Creator, director, writer and producer	Franky Falzoni	23 episodes
2008–2011	Swift and Shift Couriers	Creator, director, writer and producer	Paul 'Mario' Gauci	19 episodes
2006	World Record Pizza	Creator, director, writer and producer	Pauly Falzoni	6 episodes
2006	The Da Vinci Cup	Creator, director, writer and producer	Pauly Falzoni	3 episodes
2004	Pizza: Special Deliveries	Creator, director, writer and producer	Pauly Falzoni	10 episodes
2004	Pizza Live	Creator, director, writer and producer	Pauly Falzoni	5 episodes
2000–2007; 2019–2021	Pizza / Fat Pizza / Fat Pizza: Back in Business	Creator, director, writer and producer	Pauly Falzoni	56 episodes
1999	The 50 Foot Show	Director		
1998	Heartland	Title Design		Mini-series
Short films
Year	Title	Credit	Role	Notes
1998	Intolerance	Director and producer		
1997	Dangerous Pizza	Director, writer and producer		
1996	Space Pizza	Director, writer and producer		
1995	Pizza Man	Director, writer and producer		
1994	More Than Legends	Director and writer		

== Charity work ==
In 2014, Fenech broke the Guinness World Record for 'Most Self Portrait (selfie) Photographs Taken in 24 hours’, taking a total of 2408. In order to qualify, each 'selfie' photograph had to be taken with a different participant. The event was held to raise money and awareness for Barnardo's Australia.

== Awards and nominations ==
=== ARIA Music Awards ===
The ARIA Music Awards are a set of annual ceremonies presented by Australian Recording Industry Association (ARIA), which recognise excellence, innovation, and achievement across all genres of the music of Australia. They commenced in 1987.

Year	Nominee / work	Award	Result	Ref.
2013	Pauly's Shorts	Best Comedy Release	Nominated	

=== Tropfest ===
- 1998: Best Film (Intolerance, won)

=== Slamdance Film Festival ===
- 1999: Grand Jury Prize (Somewhere in the Darkness, nominated)

=== Logie Awards ===
- 2001: Most Outstanding Comedy Program (Pizza, nominated)
- 2002: Most Outstanding Comedy Program (Pizza, nominated)
- 2004: Most Outstanding Comedy Program (Pizza, nominated)
- 2005: Most Outstanding Comedy Program (Pizza, nominated)
- 2014: Most Outstanding Light Entertainment Program (Housos, won)

=== Australian Comedy Awards ===
- 2003: Outstanding Australian TV Comedy – character based (Pizza, nominated)

=== Australian Writers' Guild ===
- 2011: Comedy – Situation or Narrative (Housos, nominated)
