= 20 to One =

Australian television series

- Also known as: 20 to 1
- Genre: Nostalgia
- Presented by: Erin Molan; Nick Cody
- Country of origin: Australia
- Original language: English
- No. of seasons: 11
- No. of episodes: 155

Production
- Running time: 60 minutes

Original release
- Network: Nine Network
- Release: 13 October 2005 – 12 April 2011
- Release: 31 May 2016 – 5 August 2019

20 to One (known as 20 to 1 before 2016) is an Australian television series on the Nine Network from 2005, that counts down an undefined "top 20" of elements or events of popular culture, such as films, songs, or sporting scandals. The format mixes archival footage of the listed events with comments from various Australian celebrities.

Originally the show was hosted by Bud Tingwell and narrated by David Reyne; the pair were replaced by Bert Newton as host for the second season. The series was rebooted by the Nine Network and returned for its eleventh season on 31 May 2016 with new hosts, Australian radio presenters Fitzy and Wippa. From 2017, the show was hosted by Erin Molan and Dave Thornton.

== Format ==
Each episode counts down the "top twenty" events following a particular theme, from position 20 down to number 1. Media clips depicting the event are played as the host provides background information of the entry. This is followed by clips of celebrities providing judgment on the clip or event.

== Controversy ==
During the segment aired on 19 June 2019, co-hosts Erin Molan and Nick Cody stated that the South Korean boy band BTS was "so popular it could heal the rift between North and South Korea." She also mentioned the band's success in the United States, even though "only one band member actually speaks English." among other comments. Many other celebrities made similar comments during the segment. Most notably was comedian Jimmy Carr, who jokingly compared the band's international success to the explosion of a nuclear bomb in North Korea, saying: "When I first heard something Korean had exploded in America, I got worried. So I guess, it could've been worse – but not much worse." Subsequently, the hashtags #channel9apologize and #channel9racist started trending as fans of the band demanded an apology from Channel 9. The BTS Australia Twitter fan account wrote: "This is unfair and presenting inaccurate information. You disregarded their achievements, and instead let your xenophobic, racist mindsets be biased instead. We want an apology." On 20 June 2019, Channel 9 issued a non-apology apology, writing: "We apologize to any who may have been offended by last night's episode."

== Series overview ==
Season	Episodes	Originally aired		Host	Narrator
Season	Episodes	Premiere	Finale	Host	Narrator
1	7	14 October 2005	24 November 2005	Charles "Bud" Tingwell	David Reyne
2	9	13 February 2006	8 May 2006	Bert Newton	
3	14	5 September 2006	4 December 2006	Bert Newton	
4	11	13 February 2007	15 May 2007	Bert Newton	
5	6	11 September 2007	27 November 2007	Bert Newton	
6	10	26 February 2008	24 June 2008	Bert Newton	
7	19	26 August 2008	21 January 2009	Bert Newton	
8	42	5 February 2009	24 November 2009	Bert Newton	
9	16	11 February 2010	14 September 2010	Bert Newton	
10	6	1 March 2011	12 April 2011	Bert Newton	
11	10	31 May 2016	25 July 2016	Fitzy and Wippa	
12	5	6 June 2017	4 July 2017	Erin Molan & Dave Thornton	
13	8	29 April 2019	5 August 2019	Erin Molan & Nick Cody	

== Episodes ==
=== Season One (2005) ===
No. overall	No. in season	Episode	First Aired	Subsequent airing	Re-edited
1	1	"Most Embarrassing Moments"	13 October 2005	25 June 2006	Yes
2	2	"Spectacular Dummy Spits"	20 October 2005	22 May 2006; 10 April 2007	Yes
3	3	"Great Aussie Songs"	27 October 2005	15 May 2006	Yes
4	4	"Best Australian Commercials"	3 November 2005	10 April 2006	Yes
5	5	"Great Aussie Ideas, Icons and Inventions"	10 November 2005	17 April 2006	Yes
6	6	"Moments That Stopped The Nation"	17 November 2005	—N/a	—N/a
7	7	"Moments of Madness"	24 November 2005	—N/a	—N/a

=== Season Two (2006) ===
No. overall	No. in season	Episode	First Aired	Subsequent airing	Re-edited
8	1	"One Hit Wonders"	13 February 2006	6 August 2006	Yes
9	2	"Aussie Scandals"	20 February 2006	13 August 2006; 12 April 2009; 15 November 2009	Yes
10	3	"Outrageous TV Characters"	27 February 2006	—N/a	—N/a
11	4	"Hits and Misses"	13 March 2006	—N/a	—N/a
12	5	"Unscripted and Unplanned"	27 March 2006	—N/a	—N/a
13	6	"Moments That Stopped the World"	3 April 2006	20 March 2007	Re-edited and Reordered
14	7	"Tears and Tantrums"	24 April 2006	12 November 2006	Yes
15	8	"Great Logies Moments"	1 May 2006	—N/a	—N/a
16	9	"Fads and Fashions"	8 May 2006	19 November 2006	Yes

=== Season Three (2006) ===
No. overall	No. in season	Episode	First Aired	Subsequent airing	Re-edited
17	1	"Hoaxes, Cheats and Liars"	5 September 2006	20 February 2007; 12 August 2008	Yes
18	2	"Greatest Songs of All Time"	12 September 2006	13 March 2007	Yes
19	3	"Mysteries and Conspiracies"	19 September 2006	7 March 2007; 19 August 2008	Re-edited and Reordered
20	4	"The Rich and the Famous"	26 September 2006	—N/a	—N/a
21	5	"Great Aussie Films"	3 October 2006	24 April 2007	Yes
22	6	"Incredible Stories of Survival"	10 October 2006	1 May 2007	Yes
23	7	"Crazes and Phases"	17 October 2006	—N/a	—N/a
24	8	"Celebrity Scandals"	24 October 2006	—N/a	—N/a
25	9	"Love Songs"	31 October 2006	22 May 2007	Yes
26	10	"Triumphs and Tragedies"	7 November 2006	—N/a	—N/a
27	11	"Memorable Movie Characters"	14 November 2006	—N/a	—N/a
28	12	"Sexiest People"	21 November 2006	—N/a	—N/a
29	13	"Shocks and Shockers"	28 November 2006	—N/a	—N/a
30	14	"Magnificent Movies"	4 December 2006	23 July 2007	Yes

=== Season Four (2007) ===
No. overall	No. in season	Episode	First Aired	Subsequent airing	Re-edited
31	1	"Aussie Parties and Pastimes"	13 February 2007	31 December 2008; 16 April 2009	Yes
32	2	"Life Changing Moments"	18 February 2007	—N/a	—N/a
33	3	"Fads and Phases"	25 February 2007	28 December 2008	Yes
34	4	"Amazing Moments in Music"	4 March 2007	5 August 2008	Yes
35	5	"Mistakes, Madness and Mayhem"	11 March 2007	4 January 2009	Yes
36	6	"Funny Films"	18 March 2007	16 July 2007	Yes
37	7	"Party Songs"	15 April 2007	—N/a	—N/a
38	8	"Rebels and Risk-Takers"	22 April 2007	4 December 2007	Yes
39	9	"Billion Dollar Ideas"	29 April 2007	11 January 2009; 25 January 2009	Yes
40	10	50 to 1: "Great Movie One-Liners" (2hr Special)	8 May 2007	26 August 2008 24 November 2009	Yes
41	11	"Biffs and Blunders"	15 May 2007	18 January 2009	Yes

=== Season Five (2007–08) ===
No. overall	No. in season	Episode	First Aired	Subsequent airing	Re-edited
42	1	"Movie Heroes and Villains"	11 September 2007	—N/a	—N/a
43	2	"Scandals and Sensations"	30 October 2007	—N/a	—N/a
44	3	"Sexiest Movie Moments"	6 November 2007	11 November 2008	Yes
45	4	"Fantastic Sporting Finishes"	13 November 2007	—N/a	—N/a
46	5	"Songs You Can't Get Out of Your Head"	20 November 2007	3 January 2010	—N/a
47	6	"Movie Saints and Sinners"	27 November 2007	30 November 2008	Yes

=== Season Six (2008) ===
No. overall	No. in season	Episode	First Aired	Subsequent airing	Re-edited
48	1	"Greatest Sporting Heroes"	26 February 2008	—N/a	—N/a
49	2	"Karaoke Classics"	29 April 2008	18 November 2008	Yes
50	3	"Pranks and Pranksters"	6 May 2008	—N/a	—N/a
51	4	"Music with a Message"	13 May 2008	—N/a	—N/a
52	5	"Crazy Customs"	20 May 2008	25 November 2008	Yes
53	6	"Child Stars, Where Are They Now?"	27 May 2008	16 November 2008	—N/a
54	7	"Girls on Film"	3 June 2008	23 November 2008	Yes
55	8	"Celebrity Shocks and Shockers"	10 June 2008	28 January 2009	Yes
56	9	"Happy Songs"	17 June 2008	—N/a	—N/a
57	10	"Sporting Tears and Triumphs"	24 June 2008	—N/a	—N/a

=== Season Seven (2008–09) ===
No. overall	No. in season	Episode	First Aired	Subsequent airing	Re-edited
58	1	"Fantastic Fads"	26 August 2008	—N/a	—N/a
59	2	"Celebrity Sins and Sensations"	2 September 2008	25 August 2009	Yes
60	3	"Greatest TV Moments"	9 September 2008	5 April 2009	Yes
61	4	"Greatest Songs of the Decade"	23 September 2008	—N/a	—N/a
62	5	"Celebrity Flings"	30 September 2008	20 October 2009	Yes
63	6	"Greatest Movie Scenes"	7 October 2008	4 August 2009	Yes
64	7	"Celebrity Chart Floppers"	14 October 2008	1 September 2009	Yes
65	8	"Pranks and Practical Jokes"	19 October 2008	—N/a	—N/a
66	9	"Amazing Comebacks"	21 October 2008	11 August 2009	Yes
67	10	"Born Rich and Famous"	26 October 2008	18 August 2009	Yes
68	11	"Sensational Sporting Scandals"	26 October 2008	30 April 2009	Yes
69	12	"Hollywood Blockbusters"	2 November 2008	10 September 2009	Yes
70	13	"Musical Milestones"	4 November 2008	29 September 2009	Yes
71	14	"World's Funniest People"	9 November 2008	7 May 2009	Yes
72	15	"Spectacular Stuff-Ups"	3 December 2008	—N/a	—N/a
73	16	"Hits That Stick"	10 December 2008	—N/a	—N/a
74	17	"World's Greatest Ideas"	7 January 2009	—N/a	—N/a
75	18	"Hottest Moments in Music"	14 January 2009	—N/a	—N/a
76	19	"Hits and Misses"	21 January 2009	26 November 2009	Yes

=== Season Eight (2009) ===
No. overall	No. in season	Episode	First Aired	Subsequent airing	Re-edited
77	1	"World's Most Daring Movies"	5 February 2009	22 March 2011	—N/a
78	2	"Celebrities Exposed"	19 February 2009	12 October 2010	—N/a
79	3	"Losing It"	26 February 2009	13 July 2010	—N/a
80	4	"What Were They Thinking!"	5 March 2009	20 July 2010	—N/a
81	5	"The Rebels"	12 March 2009	3 August 2010	—N/a
82	6	"Sexiest Movie Scenes"	19 March 2009	—N/a	—N/a
83	7	"Hottest Stars on the Planet"	26 March 2009	—N/a	—N/a
84	8	"Saucy Songs"	2 April 2009	—N/a	—N/a
85	9	"Pranks and Practical Jokers"	9 April 2009	15 September 2009; 4 February 2010	Yes
86	10	"Celebrity Dangerous Liaisons"	21 April 2009	—N/a	—N/a
87	11	"TV Couples"	23 April 2009	3 November 2009	Yes
88	12	"Scene-Stealing Songs"	28 April 2009	27 October 2009	Yes
89	13	"Hollywood's Biggest Scandals"	5 May 2009	13 October 2009	Yes
90	14	"Hollywood's Hot List"	14 May 2009	—N/a	—N/a
91	15	"Sizzling Superstars"	21 May 2009	—N/a	—N/a
92	16	"Big Screen Buddies"	28 May 2009	6 October 2009	Yes
93	17	"Sexiest Moments in Music"	4 June 2009	—N/a	—N/a
94	18	"Scorching Screen Moments"	11 June 2009	—N/a	—N/a
95	19	"Outrageous Sport Stars"	18 June 2009	—N/a	—N/a
96	20	"Madness & Meltdowns"	30 June 2009	8 November 2009	Yes
97	21	"Planet Pop Hits"	7 July 2009	—N/a	—N/a
98	22	"Hollywood's Sexiest"	16 July 2009	10 January 2010	—N/a
99	23	"Chart-Busting Duos"	21 July 2009	29 November 2009	—N/a
100	24	"Greatest TV Families"	23 July 2009	13 December 2009	—N/a
101	25	"European Cartoon Heroes"	28 July 2009	—N/a	—N/a
102	26	"Elvis Hits"	30 July 2009	20 December 2009	—N/a
103	27	"Celebrity Flings Caught on Film"	6 August 2009	—N/a	—N/a
104	28	"Rock 'n' Roll Anthems"	13 August 2009	17 August 2010	—N/a
105	29	"Aesop's Fables"	20 August 2009	—N/a	—N/a
106	30	"Cougars and Cradle-Snatchers"	27 August 2009	21 September 2010	—N/a
107	31	"All-Aussie Superstars"	3 September 2009	24 August 2010	—N/a
108	32	"Fifteen Minutes of Fame"	8 September 2009	31 August 2010	—N/a
109	33	"Outrageous Rock Stars"	17 September 2009	5 October 2010	—N/a
110	34	"Fairy Tales"	22 September 2009	—N/a	—N/a
111	35	"TV Characters You Love to Hate"	27 September 2009	—N/a	—N/a
112	36	"Australia's Funniest Characters"	11 October 2009	27 July 2010	—N/a
113	37	"Aussie Jukebox Hits"	18 October 2009	—N/a	—N/a
114	38	"Tricks, Treats and Treasures"	25 October 2009	—N/a	—N/a
115	39	"Nursery Rhymes"	1 November 2009	—N/a	—N/a
116	40	"Hollywood Heavyweights"	10 November 2009	—N/a	—N/a
117	41	"Great Live Acts"	17 November 2009	—N/a	—N/a
118	42	50 to 1: "All Time Greatest Movie Quotes" (2 hr Special)	24 November 2009	4 January 2011	Re-edited and Re-ordered

=== Season Nine (2010) ===
No. overall	No. in season	Episode	First Aired	Subsequent airing
119	1	"Sex on the Screen"	11 February 2010	30 March 2011
120	2	"World's Sexiest Scandals"	18 February 2010	15 March 2011
121	3	"Movie Monsters"	25 February 2010	—N/a
122	4	"Sporty Rich and Sexy"	2 March 2010	25 January 2011
123	5	"Celebrity, Mad, and Bad"	4 March 2010	18 January 2011
124	6	"Sexiest on the Planet"	11 March 2010	10 August 2010
125	7	"All-Time Favourite TV Themes"	30 March 2010	—N/a
126	8	"Blockbuster Heroes"	6 April 2010	11 March 2011
127	9	"Greatest Sporting Anthems"	20 April 2010	1 February 2011
128	10	"Greatest Aussie Chart Toppers"	9 June 2010	—N/a
129	11	"Greatest Sports Movies of All Time"	16 June 2010	—N/a
130	12	"Our All-Time Favourite Films"	23 June 2010	—N/a
131	13	"Caught on Tape"	30 June 2010	4 March 2011
132	14	"Greatest Break-Up Songs"	14 July 2010	1 April 2011
133	15	"Megastars with Megabucks"	21 July 2010	—N/a
134	16	"Eighties: Good, Bad and Ugly"	14 September 2010	—N/a

=== Season Ten (2011) ===
No. overall	No. in season	Episode	First Aired
135	1	"Hits For Kids Greatest Hits"	1 March 2011
136	2	"Disco Inferno"	8 March 2011
137	3	"Kids' Favourite Songs"	18 March 2011
138	4	"Worst Cover Songs"	25 March 2011
139	5	"The Perfect Driving Album Too"	5 April 2011
140	6	"Unleashed - Animals In Music Videos"	12 April 2011

=== Season Eleven (2016) ===
No. overall	No. in season	Episode	First Aired	Timeslot	Viewers (millions)	Rank
139	1	"Viral Sensations of the Internet Age"	31 May 2016	Tuesday 7:30 pm	0.715	#12
140	2	"Celebrity OMG Moments"	7 June 2016	Tuesday 7:30 pm	0.645	#13
141	3	"Wild Commercials"	12 June 2016	Sunday 7:00 pm	0.913	#4
142	4	"Epic Fails"	14 June 2016	Tuesday 7:30 pm	0.798	#10
143	5	"Aussiewood Stars"	21 June 2016	Tuesday 7:30 pm	0.688	#12
144	6	"Outrageous Sports Stars"	28 June 2016	Tuesday 7:30 pm	0.683	#11
145	7	"Classic TV Characters"	4 July 2016	Monday 7:30 pm	0.659	#20
146	8	"Celebrity Hook-Ups"	11 July 2016	Monday 7:30 pm	0.593	—N/a
147	9	"15 Minutes of Fame"	18 July 2016	Monday 7:30 pm	0.645	#19
148	10	"Pop Rockers And Shockers"	25 July 2016	Monday 7:30 pm	0.572	—N/a

=== Season Twelve (2017) ===
No. overall	No. in season	Episode	First Aired	Timeslot	Viewers (millions)	Rank
149	1	"Superstar Commercials"	6 June 2017	Tuesday 7:30 pm	0.530	#18
150	2	"Greatest Comebacks"	13 June 2017	Tuesday 7:30 pm	0.526	#17
151	3	"Viral Megastars"	20 June 2017	Tuesday 7:30 pm	0.572	#14
152	4	"Amazing Animals"	27 June 2017	Tuesday 7:30 pm	0.510	#16
153	5	"Amazing Commercials"	4 July 2017	Tuesday 7:30 pm	0.493	#19

== Celebrity contributors ==
This is a partial list (some in order of appearance) of the celebrities who contributed comments to 20 to One.

=== 2005–2011 ===
- Amanda Keller – TV and Radio Presenter
- Anh Do – Comedian
- Anthony Callea – Singer
- Ash & Luttsy – Radio Personalities
- Ben Dark – TV Presenter
- Bianca Dye – Radio Presenter
- Bill Collins – Movie Reviewer
- Billy Birmingham – Comedian
- Blair McDonough – Reality TV Star / Actor
- Bob Willis – Former English Cricket Captain
- Brendan Jones – Radio Presenter
- Brodie Harper – TV Presenter
- Cameron Daddo – Actor
- Catriona Rowntree – TV Presenter
- Charles "Bud" Tingwell – Actor and Previous Host of 20 to 1 (Series 2 to 7)
- Colin Lane – Comedian
- Damian Walshe-Howling – Actor
- Danny Bonaduce – TV and Radio Host
- David Campbell – Singer
- David Hasselhoff – American Actor
- Deni Hines – Singer
- Donny Osmond – Singer
- Duncan Armstrong – Olympic Athlete
- Ed Phillips – TV Presenter
- Eddie McGuire – TV Presenter
- Georgie Gardner – News presenter
- Gorgi Coghlan – TV Presenter
- Guy Sebastian – Singer
- Harry M. Miller – Personal Management
- Imogen Bailey – Actress and Model
- Ita Buttrose – Journalist and Author
- Jay Laga'aia – Actor / Play School presenter
- Jessica Napier – Actress
- Jessica Rowe – Seven News presenter
- Jessica Tovey – Actress
- John Burgess – Former Game Show Host
- John Jarratt – Actor
- John-Michael Howson – Entertainment Reporter
- Josh Lawson – Actor
- Kate Ceberano – Singer
- Ken Sutcliffe – Sports Presenter
- Kristian Schmid – Actor
- Lisa Wilkinson – TV Presenter
- Livinia Nixon – TV Presenter
- Liz Ellis – Retired Netball Player
- Lizzy Lovette – Radio announcer
- Lorraine Bayly – Actress
- Lochie Daddo – TV Presenter
- Mark Ferguson – Seven News presenter
- Matthew Johns – The NRL Footy Show
- Megan Gale – Supermodel
- Michala Banas – Actress and Singer
- Mike Goldman – TV Presenter
- Mikey Robins – TV and Radio Presenter and comedian
- Nikki Webster – Singer/Performer
- Paul Harragon – The NRL Footy Show
- Paul Vautin – The NRL Footy Show
- Paulini Curuenavuli – Singer
- Peter Berner – TV and Radio Presenter
- Peter FitzSimons – Author/Journalist
- Peter Garrett – Singer/Politician
- Peter Sterling – Nine Footy Commentator
- Peter Thompson – Film Reviewer
- Prue MacSween – Media Commentator
- Richard Wilkins – TV Presenter
- Ricki-Lee Coulter – Singer
- Ronan Keating – Singer
- Sam Newman – The AFL Footy Show
- Sam Simmons – Triple J presenter and Comedian
- Sami Lukis – Radio announcer
- Scott Cam – TV Presenter
- Shane Crawford – Former AFL Player
- Shane Jacobson as Kenny Smyth – Film Character
- Shannon Noll – Singer
- Simon Burke – Actor / Play School presenter
- Tania Zaetta – Actress/television presenter
- Tara Moss – Author and Model
- The Umbilical Brothers (aka David Collins and Shane Dundas) – Comedy Duo
- Tim Ferguson – Comedian
- Todd Rixon – Former Dancer
- Tom Burlinson – Actor and Singer
- Toni Pearen – TV Presenter
- Tony Martin – Radio Presenter
- Tracy Grimshaw – TV Presenter
- Wendy Harmer – Radio Presenter
- "Weird Al" Yankovic – Singer
- Zoe Naylor – Actress

=== 2016–2019 ===
==== Returning ====
Returning contributors are revived in 2016 include:

- David Campbell – Singer
- Michala Banas – Actress
- Peter Berner – TV and Radio Presenter
- Prue MacSween – Media Commentator
- Richard Wilkins – Today Show
- Tracy Grimshaw – Journalist/TV Presenter

==== New ====
New contributors in 2016 include:

- Beau Ryan – The NRL Footy Show co-host
- Claire Hooper – Comedian
- Dami Im – Singer
- Gene Simmons – Singer
- Gyton Grantley – Actor
- Jack Gleeson – British Actor
- Jackie O – Radio Host
- Jason Akermanis – Former AFL Player
- Jean Kittson – Actress and Comedian
- Jeff Goldblum – American Actor
- Kevin Rudd – Former Australian Prime Minister
- Kat Hoyos – Actor
- Lindsay Lohan – American Actress
- Martina Navratilova – Tennis Player
- Sharon Osbourne – Media Personality
- Sylvia Jeffreys – Today Show

== Awards ==
Logie Awards:

- Nominated for 2007 Most Popular Light Entertainment Program (lost to Rove Live).

== See also ==
- 50 Years 50 Shows
- List of Australian television series
- List of programs broadcast by Nine Network
