= Ian Turpie =

Australian media performer

- Studio NWS-9 (Channel 9) headshot of Turpie
- Born: Ian Bruce Turpie; 6 November 1943; Melbourne, Victoria, Australia
- Died: 11 March 2012 (aged 68); Narraweena, New South Wales, Australia
- Other name: "Turps"
- Education: Hector Crawford Drama School
- Occupations: Actor; singer; television personality and host; game show presenter
- Years active: 1953–2012
- Television: The New Price Is Right Supermarket Sweep
- Spouse: Jan Hamilton (m. 1968)
- Children: 3
- Awards: Mo Award; Penguin Award; Logie Award

Ian Bruce Turpie (6 November 1943 – 11 March 2012), sometimes referred to as Turps, was an Australian performer, actor (theatre, television, film), pop singer and presenter (television, radio). He was the host of the teen pop music TV show, The Go!! Show (1965–66) and various TV game shows, The Price Is Right (1981–1985, 1989), and Supermarket Sweep (1992–1994). As a TV actor he portrayed Keith Warne on Swift and Shift Couriers (2008, 2011) and Wazza and Narrator in Housos (2011). He was diagnosed with oesophageal cancer in 2011 and died the following year, aged 68.

== Early life ==
Ian Bruce Turpie was born on 6 November 1943 at Ferntree Gully's Bush Nursing Hospital to Don Turpie (1911–1990), a shipping clerk and Joyce (née Olson, 1917–1999) and grew up with six siblings. He attended nearby Boronia State School, where he performed gymnastics and school plays. His first starring role, in a school play, was as the titular character in Toad of Toad Hall, at the local Progress Hall, in August 1954. He began his entertainment career at the age of 10, when he was accepted at the Hector Crawford Drama School. For secondary education he attended a technical high school.

== Career ==
Turpie also gained recognition as a juvenile actor working in radio. He appeared in radio programmes alongside Robert Helpmann and June Bronhill, and in the Crawford radio series, D24, which was recorded at the 3DB studios in Melbourne and broadcast nationally over the Major Broadcasting Network.

During his teens, Turpie began his music career and focused on playing guitar, songwriting and singing. By the age of 16, he was a seasoned radio and stage performer, touring Australia in Peter Pan (1957), Auntie Mame (1959) and Bye Bye Birdie (1961), and appearing in several National Theatre productions including Shakespeare's Macbeth.

=== Television ===
Turpie played a radical student, who is shot dead in a bank robbery, in the opening scene of the debut episode of Crawford Productions' police procedural TV series, Homicide (October 1964). He had made his TV debut in May of that year in a guest role in the episode, "Queen Versus Wilson" of the courtroom drama Consider Your Verdict.

Turpie performed on Bandstand, Time for Terry and The Graham Kennedy Show during the early 1960s. He replaced Johnny O'Keefe for a stint as national host on TV pop music show, Sing, Sing, Sing. He was an early boyfriend of Olivia Newton-John, with whom he appeared in a 1965 Australian musical telemovie, Funny Things Happen Down Under, which was Newton-John's debut performance. He was chosen to host the teenage variety show The Go!! Show from mid-1965 until the end of 1966.

In the 1970s, Turpie moved to Sydney to work the club circuit, and he continued to make guest appearances on numerous television shows, including The Mike Walsh Show, The Bert Newton Show, A Guy Called Athol, and the ABC variety series Follies. In the following decade, Turpie became a nationwide figure as host of the game show The New Price Is Right (1981–1985, 1989). This was followed by two other game shows, Press Your Luck (1987–1988) and Supermarket Sweep (1992–1994).

Turpie developed cult status following a four-year stint as Club President on Roy & HG's Club Buggery (1995–1997) and its sequel, The Channel Nine Show (1998). Known as the Giant of the G Chord, he performed renditions of Nirvana's "Smells Like Teen Spirit", and, complete with suspenders, The Rocky Horror Picture Show's "Time Warp". Less serious Club Buggery appearances in sketches, "Turps About the House", "Captain Ajax" and "Sam Stain", showcased his comedic talents, as did a semi-regular role as cabaret-style singer Rolan Fields in drama series Always Greener (2001–03). From 2000 he acted in the TV comedy series Pizza and had a lead role in Housos (2011) as Wazza Jones, who was also the program's narrator. He portrayed depot manager Keith Warne in Swift & Shift Couriers seasons one (2008) and two (2011).

== Personal life ==
Ian Turpie was the boyfriend of Olivia Newton-John for about five years from his nineteenth birthday. He provided guitar when Newton-John auditioned for Johnny O'Keefe's Sing, Sing, Sing's talent quest in September 1964, which she won. Newton-John returned to England in 1966. They agreed not to date others unless they had been separated for more than three months; Newton-John remained in England for longer. By the time Newton-John briefly returned from England for a visit, Turpie was dating his future wife, Jan. Turpie married Jan Hamilton, a model, in 1968, and the couple had three children. Due to Turpie's career, the family relocated to Sydney in 1974.

In 2004, the Australian Competition & Consumer Commission (ACCC) took legal action against Turpie for misleading and deceptive conduct in breach of the Trade Practices Act. The ACCC alleged that Turpie had made false claims (that he was losing his sexual potency) in advertisements for an erectile dysfunction treatment spray from the Australian Medical Institute.

In 2005, Turpie pleaded guilty to drink driving after driving in Manly, New South Wales, with a blood alcohol level of 0.08 (the legal limit in the state is 0.05). He was fined $867 and had his driver's licence suspended for six months; however, this was overturned on appeal. After taking into account Turpie's charity work and his need to drive to work, Judge Reg Blanch ordered that no conviction be recorded. Turpie told reporters he was sorry for doing a "stupid thing".

=== Death ===
On 18 February 2011, it was announced that Turpie, a heavy smoker, had been diagnosed with oesophageal cancer. He died on 11 March 2012, aged 68. When The Price is Right debuted its reboot in 2012, host Larry Emdur dedicated the first episode in memory of Turpie.

== Discography ==
=== Albums ===
List of albums
Title	Album details
Turps Is The Talk of the Town	Released: 1996; Label: ABC Music (4898562); Formats: CD

== Awards and nominations ==
- Penguin Award, Best Light Entertainment, The New Price Is Right (1985)
- Logie Award, Most Popular Western Australia Show, Turpie Tonight (1983)
- Penguin Award, Best Light Entertainment, The New Price Is Right (1982)

=== ARIA Music Awards ===
The ARIA Music Awards are a set of annual ceremonies presented by Australian Recording Industry Association (ARIA), which recognise excellence, innovation, and achievement across all genres of the music of Australia. They commenced in 1987.

Year	Nominee / work	Award	Result	Ref.
1997	Talk of the Town	Best Comedy Release	Nominated	

=== Mo Awards ===
The Australian Entertainment Mo Awards (commonly known informally as the Mo Awards), were annual Australian entertainment industry awards. They recognise achievements in live entertainment in Australia from 1975 to 2016. Ian Turpie won one award in that time.

Year	Nominee / work	Award	Result (wins only)
2010	Ian Turpie	Hall of Fame	inductee

== Filmography ==
- Funny Things Happen Down Under, as Lennie (1965)
- Heaven's Burning, cameo as used car salesman (1997)
- All the Way (1998)
- Somewhere in the Darkness, as the Weatherman (1998)
- Kissing Kimberley Cooper (Tropfest film)

== TV ==
=== Acting ===
- Consider Your Verdict (1964) 1 episode
- Homicide (1964) 1 episode
- The Magic Boomerang (1965) 1 episode
- TV Follies (1979)
- Pizza as Ian Clinton (2000) 1 episode season 1 episode 4
- Always Greener as Rolan Fields (2002–2003) 6 episodes
- Swift and Shift Couriers as Keith Warne (2008, 2011) 19 episodes
- Double the Fist as M.C (2008) 1 episode
- Housos as Wazza (2011)

=== Host regular ===
- Club Buggery, ABC (1996-1997)
- The Go!! Show
- Sing, Sing, Sing (replacing Johnny O'Keefe)
- Surprise, Surprise - co-host with Tommy Hanlon Jr
- Supermarket Sweep, Nine Network (1992-1994)
- Time for Terry co-host with Terry O'Neill
- Turpie Tonight
- The Newlyweds Game, Network Ten (1968), Nine Network (1987)
- The New Price Is Right (1981–1985)
- The Price Is Right (1989)
- Press Your Luck, Seven Network (1987–1988)

=== Guest appearances ===
- The Young Entertainers
- This is your Life (with Mike Munro)
- Love is in the Air
- Long Way to the Top
- All the Way
- Theatre Royal
- Revue 7
- TeenTime
- Kommotion
- Bandstand (Brian Henderson)
- Steve Vizard Tonight
- Bert Newton Show
- Blankety Blanks (Graham Kennedy)
- Family Feud (Rob Brough)
- The Fat (Tony Squires)
- Mike Walsh Show
- Don Lane Show
- Hey Hey It's Saturday (Daryl Somers)
- Celebrity Who Wants to be a Millionaire?
- Celebrity Wheel of Fortune
- Penthouse Club (Mary Hardy)
- Bandstand
- A Guy Called Athol
- ABC Follies
- The Melbourne Show
- Supermarket Sweep
- Spicks and Specks
- We'll Call You

== Theatre ==
Credits:

- Peter Pan (December 1957) – Princess Theatre, Melbourne
- Nude with Violin (1958) – Comedy Theatre, Melbourne with Robert Helpmann,
- Auntie Mame (February 1959) – Princess Theatre, Melbourne; (July) – Theatre Royal, Adelaide with Shirl Conway
- Macbeth, National Theatre
- Bye Bye Birdie (July 1961) – Theatre Royal, Adelaide; (August) – His Majesty's Theatre, Perth; (September) – Her Majesty's Theatre, Brisbane; (October) – Her Majesty's Theatre, Melbourne
- Bubble & Squeak (February 1968) – Triaca's Theatre, Melbourne with Noel Ferrier producing, Jill Perryman acting
- Hero (May 1976) – Seymour Centre, Chippendale with Graham Bond
- Jesus Christ Superstar (April 1978) – St George Leagues Club, Kogarah with Marcia Hines (Mary), John English (Judas)

== Radio ==
- appeared in some episodes of the Crawford Productions' D24, broadcast nationally on the Major Broadcasting Network
- ABC Play "Five Find Outers"
- Evening Host 2CH

== Charity work ==
Turpie was involved with the following charities: Australia Day ambassador (since 1995), Make a Wish Foundation, Merry Makers, Sunnyfield Association, Meningococcal Association, Children with Cancer, Lifeforce, Sydney Children's Hospital (Celebrity Golf Days), Alzheimer's Australia NSW and Rotary Club.
