= Swift and Shift Couriers =

Australian comedy TV series

- Genre: Comedy; Off-color humor Adventure
- Written by: Paul Fenech
- Directed by: Paul Fenech
- Starring: Paul Fenech; Ian Turpie; Melissa Tkautz; Amanda Keller
- Country of origin: Australia
- Original language: English
- No. of seasons: 2
- No. of episodes: 19

Production
- Executive producer: Paul Fenech
- Producers: Tanya Fraser; Serena Hunt
- Production location: Sydney
- Running time: 30 minutes (inc. adverts)

Original release
- Network: SBS One, SBS Viceland
- Release: 27 October 2008 – 17 October 2011

Related
- Fat Pizza; Housos

Swift and Shift Couriers is an Australian comedy television series that first screened on SBS TV in October 2008. The series is produced, directed and written by Paul Fenech, who was also responsible for the comedy series Pizza. It is set around the staff of the fictional 'Swift and Shift' Courier Company, in the central business district of Sydney. Episodes have been partly filmed in Egypt, India, Thailand and the United States.

The second season of Swift and Shift Couriers began screening on 15 August 2011, on SBS One.

The first and second season of Swift and Shift Couriers came out on DVD, The complete series box set came out after by Madman Entertainment.

== Cast ==
=== Management ===
- Ian Turpie as Keith Warne
- Amanda Keller as Amanda Doyle
- Brendan Jones as Jonathon Turnbull
- Melissa Tkautz as Melissa Shembry
- Nick Godsell (credited as The DarkSide) as Damien Payne
- Nicola Parry as Karen Smythe
- Anthony Salame as Anthony Sukor

=== Drivers ===
- Paul Fenech as Paul "Mario" Gauci
- Sam Greco as Louie "Luigi" Marietti
- Mark Duncan as Mark Tanner
- Mike Duncan as Mike Tanner
- Ashur Shimon as Abdul Azar
- Andrew Ausage as Sole Umaga
- Joe June as Jackie Leungfung
- Bill Drury as Bill Beazley
- Jennifer Corfield as Jen Beazley
- Tahir Bilgiç as Habib

=== Dispatch ===
- David Cooper as David Jackman
- Jioji Ravulo as Leonard Umaga
- Alex Romano as Alex Carlos
- Jim Webb as Jim Spooner
- Murray Harman as Murray Smith

=== Call Centre ===
- Kirsty Lee Allan as Leanne Murdoch
- Renzo Bellato as Renzo Ballini
- Maret Archer as Doreen Ballini
- Elle Dawe as Elle Whick
- Jan Bakker as Jan
- Oliver Miletic as Oliver Vlacic (Almost always mistakenly called Darren by Keith)
- Clarissa Morrison as Clarissa

=== Loading Dock ===
- Kevin Taumata as Kiwi Kev
- Aaron McTaggart as JJ
- Nicholas Moala as Sam
- Angry Anderson as Aaron "Agro" Smith
- Stuart Rawe as George Darwin

=== Guest cast ===
- Mario Fenech as himself
- Orlando Scolese as Fernando the florist, regular client
- Dilshan Rain as Vikram Jayasili, Indian dispatch worker
- Raphael Materese as Momo Gauci, Paul's uncle
- Waseem Khan as Indian Taxi Driver and Parking Officer
- Kamahl as Phone store employee
- Ara Natarian as Omar Azar, Abdul's cousin
- Russell Gilbert as David Cobbgrove, Sam Cobbgrove, and Scooter Guy
- Bessie Bardot as Paula Dainty and Reporter
- Tottie Goldsmith as Andrea Walsh and Fashion Woman
- John Mangos as News Guy
- Rob Shehadie as Fadi El Faik and Sharbel the Mechanic
- Garry Who as Gary Hibbett, the Safety Inspector
- Krissy Stanley as drunk lady
- Maria Venuti as Maria Shembry

== Filming location ==
Swift and Shift's Hashfield Depot was located and filmed at 37-53 Constitution Road, Meadowbank, New South Wales 2114. Hashfield is a fictional suburb, and also the implied location of another Paul Fenech series, Pizza. Some episodes were also in other parts of Australia and in Thailand, India, the United States and the Middle East. The building that Swift and Shift's depot was filmed in has since been demolished.

== Episodes ==
=== Series overview ===
Series	Episodes	Originally released	
Series	Episodes	First released	Last released
1	9	27 October 2008	15 December 2008
2	10	15 August 2011	17 October 2011

=== Season 1 (2008) ===
No. overall	No. in season	Title	Directed by	Written by	Original release date	Prod. code
1	1	"Welcome to Swift and Shift"	Paul Fenech	Paul Fenech	27 October 2008	1ACX01
It's Leanne Murdoch's first day at the Swift and Shift Courier Company. Keith is given six months to improve his hapless staff and his couriers lose the National Rugby League grand final trophy.
2	2	"The Polar Bear Suit"	Paul Fenech	Paul Fenech	3 November 2008	1ACX02
Mario and Luigi borrow a polar bear suit needed for a stage show and Keith clashes with the regional manager after the twins road rage Amanda.
3	3	"Management Training"	Paul Fenech	Paul Fenech	10 November 2008	1ACX03
Amanda and Keith have to choose management trainees from the helpless and inept staff of Swift and Shift.
4	4	"Sexy Package"	Paul Fenech	Paul Fenech	17 November 2008	1ACX04
The new efficiency managers crash the entire communications system and Mario delivers a realistic looking sex doll to the bush.
5	5	"The Rocket Ride"	Paul Fenech	Paul Fenech	24 November 2008	1ACX05
Mario hijacks a children's rocket ride and scooter.
6	6	"The Dead Body (Pt. 1)"	Paul Fenech	Paul Fenech	1 December 2008	1ACX06
Mario and Melissa have to go overseas to get a soldiers body for a publicity stunt for the company and are stopped in Thailand. (This episode is not included on the Season 1 DVD).
7	7	"The Dead Body, (Pt. 2)"	Paul Fenech	Paul Fenech	Unaired	1ACX07
Mario and Melissa arrive in Egypt and get in a dodgy cab being driven by Rob Shehadie (Rocky) and Tahir Bilgic (Habib) from Pizza, who attempt to steal the soldier's ashes. (This episode did not air on SBS due to a similarity to Jake Kovco, and is not included on the Season 1 DVD).
8	8	"The Safety Inspector"	Paul Fenech	Paul Fenech	8 December 2008	1ACX08
The depot is under scrutiny after David the Dwarf calls a safety inspector to Keith's depot. Abdul wants to kill the dispatchers after being bitten by a dog.
9	9	"A Swifty Shifty Xmas"	Paul Fenech	Paul Fenech	15 December 2008	1ACX09
Amanda wants to fire Keith at the Xmas party and Mario starts a war with a road safety worker.

=== Season 2 (2011) ===
No. overall	No. in season	Title	Directed by	Written by	Original release date
10	1	"Indians"	Paul Fenech	Paul Fenech	15 August 2011
The company as it exists is threatened by a new business plan to outsource staff to India for cheaper labour. Meanwhile, Mario must chase a bicycle-riding package thief all through the city to retain his job.
11	2	"Big Box"	Paul Fenech	Paul Fenech	22 August 2011
To teach Jim and the Indian drivers a lesson the Hashfield boys decide to box Jim up while he is asleep and book the Indians to deliver him to head office.
12	3	"Valentine's Day"	Paul Fenech	Paul Fenech	29 August 2011
A busy day at the depot – Anthony lets a cat loose, Amanda and Murray accidentally end up on a date together and Melissa finally agrees to a cup of coffee with Mario.
13	4	"Police"	Paul Fenech	Paul Fenech	5 September 2011
The Couriers attend a retraining course and Mario and Habib prank Murray, by dressing up as police.
14	5	"Medical"	Paul Fenech	Paul Fenech	12 September 2011
Swift & Shift have taken on a medical delivery contract with the government, which sees Mario and Abdul teaming up on some highly contagious deliveries.
15	6	"Birthday"	Paul Fenech	Paul Fenech	19 September 2011
It's Keith's Birthday and the boys have organised a stripper for him while head office have a harassment counsellor coming in to interview some of the staff.
16	7	"Unlicensed"	Paul Fenech	Paul Fenech	26 September 2011
Amanda threatens to fire any of Keith's couriers with less than two points on their licence, when the list comes through - Amanda's name is on it.
17	8	"Snow"	Paul Fenech	Paul Fenech	3 October 2011
It's the social club ski trip at Swift & Shift and Mario uses it as an opportunity to get Melissa back.
18	9	"Wedding (Pt. 1)"	Paul Fenech	Paul Fenech	10 October 2011
Mario and a pregnant Melissa travel to Las Vegas to tie the knot, Oliver quits so he can have time off to get married, and stuff ups at the depot abound.
19	10	"Wedding (Pt. 2)"	Paul Fenech	Paul Fenech	17 October 2011
While the staff are being forced to attend Oliver's wedding, Keith is sneaking into the Swift & Shift board meeting in a last-ditch attempt to save the depot and shame Amanda.

== See also ==
- List of Australian television series
- Fat Pizza
- Housos
- Housos vs. Authority, film
