= Housos =

- The cast of Housos
- Also known as: Housos of the Housing Commission (Season 1-2); Housos vs Virus: The Lockdown (Season 3); Housos: The Thong Warrior (Season 4)
- Genre: Comedy; Off-colour humor; Slapstick; Adventure
- Created by: Paul Fenech
- Written by: Paul Fenech
- Directed by: Paul Fenech
- Starring: Paul Fenech; Elle Dawe; Jason "Jabba" Davis; Kevin Taumata; Vanessa Davis; David Malignaggi
- Narrated by: Ian Turpie (Season 1); Elle Dawe (Season 3)
- Country of origin: Australia
- Original language: English
- No. of seasons: 4
- No. of episodes: 30 (list of episodes)

Production
- Production locations: Smithfield, NSW
- Running time: 25 minutes
- Production company: Antichoko Productions

Original release
- Network: SBS One
- Release: 24 October 2011 – 16 September 2013
- Network: 7mate
- Release: 26 October 2020 – 6 July 2022

Related
- Fat Pizza; Swift and Shift Couriers; Housos vs. Authority; Fat Pizza vs. Housos; Darradong Local Council; Bogan Hunters; Dumb Criminals

Housos (titled Housos of the Housing Commission from seasons 1 to 2, Housos vs Virus: The Lockdown from season 3, and Housos: The Thong Warrior from season 4) is an Australian comedy television series created by Paul Fenech for SBS, that screened on SBS One. The series is a satirical parody of low income Australian residents of fictional suburb Sunnyvale, New South Wales, who are living in Housing Commission public housing. In 2014, the series won the Logie Award for Most Outstanding Light Entertainment Program.

On 1 November 2012, a film based on the series was released in Australian cinemas, titled Housos vs. Authority. On 9 September 2012 it was announced that Housos would return for a second series, which premiered 22 July 2013. On 27 November 2014 another film based on and continuing the storyline of the series entitled Fat Pizza vs. Housos was released. In May 2020, a third season was announced to be airing on 7mate titled "Housos vs Virus: The Lockdown" and centred around how the characters dealt with the COVID-19 pandemic, which premiered on 26 October 2020. In February 2021, the series was renewed for a fourth season, titled "Housos: The Thong Warrior", which premiered on 7mate on 25 May 2022.

== Cast ==
The majority of the cast of Housos are from Fenech's two previous series, Pizza and Swift and Shift Couriers. Some of the cast went on to star in the successful series Bogan Hunters on 7mate.

- Elle Dawe as Sharon "Shazza" Jones, Dazza's de facto & mother of Holden.
- Paul Fenech as Frank "Franky" Falzoni, Dazza's Best Friend
  - Fenech also appears as Franky's cousin, Pauly Falzoni from Pizza during series 2.
- Jason "Jabba" Davis as Darren "Dazza" Smith, Shazza's de facto & Franky's Best Friend (series 1 and 2, flashbacks in series 3 and 4)
- Kevin Taumata as Kevin Takamata, Franky & Dazza's Friend & Vanessa's de facto
- Kyrah Brock-Fenton as Holden Jones, Shazza's grown-up daughter (series 3 & 4)
- Vanessa Davis as Vanessa "Nessa" Talawahoo, Kevin's painful de facto.
- Ian Turpie as Wazza Jones, Shazza's Dad / Narrator of the Show (series 1)
- Kiri-Leigh Schmitt as Kylie Horfoot, Franky's de facto (series 1)
- Sabeena Manalis as Sabeena, Franky's cousin (Series 1)
- Crystal Sullivan as Crystal, Kylie's Sister & Franky's on and off (de facto Frank's friend with benefits) (series 1)
- Amanda Keller as Christina Rees, Sunnyvale Mayor (series 1)
- Barry Crocker as the premier (series 1)
- Melissa Tkautz as Cheree, Franky's Ex de facto (series 1)
  - Liz Harper replaces Melissa Tkautz as Cheree in series 2 and 3.
- Andrew Ausage as Junior, Cheree's Samoan de facto
- Angry Anderson as Angry the Bikie, Leader of the Hunterz Bikie Gang
- Davey Cooper as Johnno, Angry's Dwarf-Sized Brother
- Maret Archer as Berryl, Dazza's Mum (series 1, 2 and 4, flashbacks in series 3)
- Stuart Rawe as Reg, Berryl's mentally disabled de facto as well as being Dazza's de facto stepfather (series 1, 2 and 4, flashbacks in series 3)
- Chris Franklin as Darryl "Dazza" James, Dazza's Smith's cousin and Shazza's former de facto. (series 1, flashback series 3)
- Sam Greco as Dino Falzoni, Franky's gambling addicted brother who lives in Melbourne
- George Kapiniaris as George, Franky's married in Greek cousin and Sabeena's father (series 1), later seen in series 2 as Donald Bradman's ghost as Dazza's Hallucinating
- Giani Leon as Jaydog, Holden's boyfriend who is later revealed to be Franky and Cheree's son (series 3)
- Alex Romano as Jimmy the Junkie, the leader of the junkie crew (series 2)
- Tahir Bilgic as Habib, Sunnyvale Assassins Member (series 1 & 2)
- Rob Shehadie as Rocky, Sunnyvale Assassins Member (series 1 & 2)
- Ashur Simon as Abdul, Sunnyvale Assassins Member
- Ara Natarian as Ara, Sunnyvale Assassins Member (series 1 & 2)
- Mohammed Hammoud as Mo, Sunnyvale Assassins Member (series 1 & 2)
- Joe Mifsud as Samira Shabaz, Habib's mum who wears a burqa
- Anthony Salame as the service station worker and Thwayne the McDonald's manager who dates Kylie on and off in series 1.
- Nicole Sharrock as Hayley, Franky's de facto / Barmaid who is also in Housos vs. Authority and Fat Pizza vs. Housos (series 2 & 4)
- Amarli Inez as Candy, Franky's On-Off Girlfriend (series 2)
- Derek Boyer as Bubbles, Junior's Cousin who harasses Dazza while in prison
- John Mangos as himself (appearing as a news presenter)
- Murray Harman as Officer Richard Head a Sunnyvale-based police officer
- Garry Who as Officer Garry Kock a Sunnyvale-based police officer
- James Thomas as himself (appearing as a current affairs reporter in series 2)
- Renzo Renalto as Renzo, Centerlink employee
- Waseem Khan as Waseem, Centerlink employee
- Gregory King as Tank the bikie, Vice president of the Hunterz Bikie Gang (series 1 & 2)
- Jordan Shanks as a current affairs reporter in series 4
- Krissy Stanley as pub patron

== Episodes ==
Series	Episodes	Originally released	
Series	Episodes	First released	Last released
1	9	24 October 2011	19 December 2011
2	9	22 July 2013	16 September 2013
3	5	26 October 2020	23 November 2020
4	7	25 May 2022	6 July 2022

=== Series 1 (2011) ===
No. overall	No. in series	Title	Original release date	Aus. viewers (thousands)
1	1	"Disability"	24 October 2011	284
Meet the residents of the block of the Sunnyvale Housing commission. Franky Falzoni, Kevin "Kev" Takamata, Vanessa Talawahoo, Shazza "Sharon" Jones and Dazza "Darren" Smith and many more. The 5 try to get on the disability pensions from Centrelink. Franky injures his knee after falling from a great height when running away the cops and Vanessa's and Kev's son Jaylin is injured after he shot himself in the head with a stolen nailgun making Vanessa leave the girls nightout with Shazza, Kylie and Ashley. While waiting at the hospital the Lebanese Sunnyvale Assassins (spelled Assasuns) gang shows up with multiple small cuts on their faces due to when they attempted to do a drive-by on the fire station when earlier Franky was driving a stolen fire truck almost running over Habib's mum so the gang tried shoot at the fire station but Habib leaving the windows by mistake so the glass shatters over their faces.
2	2	"Pregnant"	31 October 2011	180
When Shazza is in labour and going to give birth to her first child to Dazza, Dazza attempts to call the ambulance but due to the new Sunnyvale computer answer machine emergency system playing up, Dazza goes on all different modes of transport on a desperate way to get Shazza to the hospital. At the end Shazza gives birth to baby boy named Ned Kelly Smith which was removed by DOCS 3 days later.
3	3	"Melbourne"	7 November 2011	200
When Franky wins a toughman competition against Tank the bikie at the pub carpark, he wins Tank's new chopper. Thinking the Hunterz will come after him he goes on a road trip to Melbourne to stay with gambling addicted brother Dino with tough trip ahead of him getting there.
4	4	"Green Day"	14 November 2011	278
After the media discovers that Sunnyvale Mayor Christina Rees doesn't live in the Sunnyvale district, she says that she doesn't live at Sunnyvale due to renovations on her place, when her assistant rings up for cheap installation from Habib from a newspaper advertisement. Habib forms up a team of Franky, Kev, Shazza and Abdul to work as tradies for the installation rip off scam. Dazza ends up in jail after being caught attempting to steal Renzo the Centrelink worker's car. Dazza's cousin and Shazza's former de facto Darryl "Dazza" James gets out of jail and visits Shazza.
5	5	"Thailand Part One"	21 November 2011	203
When Shazza is desperate for cash after the events of Dazza ending in jail for attempting to steal a car and needing bail money and paying for her father Wazza gambling debts. Shazza goes up to Angry the leader of the Hunterz motorcycle club to ask for a job for some cash. She is made to go to Phuket, Thailand to smuggle in illegal steroids in bodyboard to deliver to a business associate of the Hunterz, bringing along Franky, Kev and Kylie with her.
6	6	"Thailand Part Two"	28 November 2011	N/A
When Shazza and Franky meet back up with Kev and Kylie at the Phuket hotel after being lost looking for a pie or bourbon shop, The team is being followed by constable Gary Kock who is holidaying in Thailand trying to get a wife but unsuccessful. The dealer notices the team is being followed so he writes a note and leaves on the door saying take the steroids to Phi Phi Islands so officer Kock can be killed by the terrorists but the terrorists kidnap Kev, Shazza and Kylie for a $1 million ransom each leaving Franky and officer Kock to think up a plan to rescue them. If the drugs don't get to the Hunterz associate they will kill Dazza James.
7	7	"Foxtel"	5 December 2011	N/A
The Lebbo's are selling $300 dodgy Foxtel iQ boxes so Shazza, Vanessa and Kylie threaten Dazza, Franky and Kev to get the Foxtel or they won't have sex with them until they do. Beryl also threatens to kick Dazza out if he doesn't get a Foxtel iQ box.
8	8	"Uncle Doug"	12 December 2011	N/A
Dazza's Uncle Doug is released from prison and stays at Dazza's house. Franky is forced to get a jumping castle for his son Anarchy's first birthday. If he doesn't Cheree and Junior will dob him in to the cops.
9	9	"Birthday"	19 December 2011	N/A
It is Dazza's birthday so the Housos came up how to throw Dazza the best birthday ever. When Franky, Dazza and Kev steal the Sunnyvale council car, Dazza founds forms of Sunnyvale mayor Christina Rees plans of moving the Sunnyvale Housos to the Countryside. The boys then attack the mayor with manure and then hide in the drains. After walking 45 minutes back to Dazza's house, a furious Dazza finds that everything except for his meat pies are gone. Kylie gets mad when her sister Crystal talks to Franky and the two start fighting. Franky tries to stop them only to get thrown to the floor, smashing all of Dazza's pies. Shazza then takes him to the park where Franky and Kev burn the council car.

=== Series 2 (2013) ===
No. overall	No. in series	Title	Original release date	Aus. viewers (thousands)
10	1	"Voucher"	22 July 2013	255
Dazza has traded Beryl's pills for a restaurant dinner voucher for Shazza's birthday and by the next morning forgets what he's done with it. Dazza, Kev and Franky attempt to retrace their steps the previous night to jog their memory of what happened to the voucher.
11	2	"Jailbreak"	29 July 2013	259
Beryl is arrested for defrauding Centrelink so the Housos start a protest riot. Whilst Beryl gets away, Franky, Dazza, Kev and Reg are arrested and jailed. Reg thrives in prison but Bubbles seeks to make Dazza his prison girlfriend. Dazza convinces the boys to escape. Desperate for cash, Shazza and Vanessa try out some new scams.
12	3	"Dazza the Bikie"	5 August 2013	201
When Shazza stops sleeping with Dazza, he joins the local outlaw motorcycle bikie gang, the Hunterz, in order to turn her on. He discovers that being a bikie pledge can be harder than getting a real job. Franky is caught doing a good deed by for Beryl by a tabloid 'current affairs' television crew when the junkie crew try to steal her handbag with Franky thonging Jimmy the Junkie leader so he and Kev set out on a new venture as 'Robbing Hood', getting back stuff for other people for a commission.
13	4	"Uncle Fred"	12 August 2013	178
Franky learns from his cousin Pauly (from Pizza) that his Uncle Fred – who was a role model to him – has died, and so he and Kev travel to Broken Hill to pay his last respects.
14	5	"Rehab"	19 August 2013	235
Franky steals an ambulance, and after leaving it unnattended, all of the drugs from inside are stolen by housos. Dazza goes too far and develops an addiction, causing him to trip out. Which ultimately lands him in rehab. Shazza, Kev, Vanessa and Franky go to visit him with booze and sex.
15	6	"Cops"	26 August 2013	210
It's the housos very own version of Cops called "police pursuit" a camera crew follows the daily events of constables Gary Kock and Richard Head in a typical day in Sunnyvale.
16	7	"Junkies"	22 July 2013 (SBS Viceland); 2 September 2013 (SBS One)^{a}	83 (Vice); 222 (One)
To get money for drugs, the junkies steal anything not nailed down, to sell to the Hunterz for cash, Meanwhile as Shazza, Dazza, Kev and Vanessa try to come up with a new scam of having multiple sets of twin for a twin allowance. Later the bikies don't want the Junkies new crappy stolen goods so they steal everything from the Hunterz and selling to the Lebo Sunnyvale Assasuns gang resulting the bikies and the Lebo's going to jail, the junkies are arrested after getting caught trying to rip-off the police. While they are all arrested, the housos to reclaim their property.
17	8	"Tokyo"	9 September 2013	208
When most of the residents on the block have gone on holidays. Shazza is desperate to go on a holiday but Dazza is to busy trying to grow his weed seeds. When Dazza is passed out, Franky comes up a scam to get a free holiday from The Current Affairs program by making him and Shazza have a intellectually disabled child as Abdul. When Shazza writes down Toukley as her holiday destination of choice the Current Affair thought she wrote down Tokyo due to her bad hand writing. Shazza, Franky and Abdul go to Tokyo leaving behind an angry Dazza.
18	9	"Wedding"	16 September 2013	N/A
When Dazza and Kev get Brain damage support pensions they are more cashed up and Shazza and Vanessa fear that other women will go for them for their cash, as well as Beryl receiving half of Reg's pension payments so Shazza and Vanessa and Beryl try to get Dazza, Kev and Reg to marry them.

=== Series 3: Housos vs Virus (2020) ===
No. overall	No. in series	Title	Original release date	Aus. viewers (thousands)
19	1	"Episode 1"	26 October 2020	189
20	2	"Episode 2"	2 November 2020	127
21	3	"Episode 3"	9 November 2020	122
22	4	"Episode 4"	16 November 2020	127
23	5	"Episode 5"	23 November 2020	132

=== Series 4: The Thong Warrior (2022) ===
No. overall	No. in series	Title	Original release date	Aus. viewers (thousands)
24	1	"Episode 1"	25 May 2022	N/A
25	2	"Episode 2"	1 June 2022	N/A
26	3	"Episode 3"	8 June 2022	N/A
27	4	"Episode 4"	15 June 2022	N/A
28	5	"Episode 5"	22 June 2022	N/A
29	6	"Episode 6"	29 June 2022	N/A
30	7	"Episode 7"	6 July 2022	N/A

=== Notes ===
- ^{a} "Junkies" first aired on SBS Viceland and later on SBS One.
- ^{b} Viewers from broadcast airing on SBS Viceland.

== Controversy ==
Housos came under fire from a number of western Sydney residents, who had called on SBS not to put the series on air. A petition which was initiated by residents on a housing commission property received thousands of signatures, and the efforts gained support from local politicians. Mount Druitt MP Richard Amery presented the petition in Parliament in late April 2011. Housos was also at the centre of a controversy in February 2011 when Nine Network's A Current Affair, initially claimed that the series was "reality TV". Nine Network later said that the mistake originated from an 18-year-old woman working at ninemsn. SBS was also forced to defend the show by stating that the series was not receiving funding from the government, and it was instead being funded by the network's own revenue raising activities.

== Movies ==
- Housos vs. Authority (2012)
- Fat Pizza vs. Housos (2014)
- Bogan Hunters (2015)
- Dumb Criminals (2015)
- Fat Pizza vs. Housos Live (2016)

== Awards and nominations ==
Australian Writers' Guild

- 2011: Comedy – Situation or Narrative ("Pregnant", nominated)

Logie Awards

- 2014: Most Outstanding Light Entertainment Program (won)

=== ARIA Music Awards ===
The ARIA Music Awards are a set of annual ceremonies presented by Australian Recording Industry Association (ARIA), which recognise excellence, innovation, and achievement across all genres of the music of Australia. They commenced in 1987.

Year	Nominee / work	Award	Result	Ref.
2013	Housos Live	Best Comedy Release	Nominated	

== See also ==
- List of Australian television series
- Pizza
- Housos vs. Authority
- Swift and Shift Couriers
- Bogan Hunters
