= Fat Pizza =

- Directed by: Paul Fenech
- Written by: Tahir Bilgiç; Paul Fenech
- Based on: Pizza (TV series)
- Produced by: Tanith Carrol; Paul Fenech; Jeff Purser
- Starring: Paul Fenech; Paul Nakad; John Boxer; Tahir Bilgiç; Jabba
- Narrated by: Paul Fenech
- Cinematography: Mike Kliem
- Production companies: Village Roadshow Pictures; SBS Independent (uncredited)
- Distributed by: Roadshow Films
- Release dates: 10 April 2003 (Australia); 21 August 2003 (New Zealand)
- Running time: 96 minutes
- Country: Australia
- Language: English
- Box office: $2.1 million

Fat Pizza is a 2003 Australian comedy film based on the Pizza television series, both of which were created, produced, written and starred in by Paul Fenech. The film's story takes place between seasons two (episode "Desert Pizza") and three (episode "Brand New Pizza") of the television series. It features Rebel Wilson's first movie credit.

It was produced by Village Roadshow Pictures and SBS Independent (uncredited). It was filmed in the Canterbury-Bankstown region of Sydney, specifically Bass Hill and Chullora. Scenes were also filmed in the Hills District of Sydney, at Kellyville and Norwest Business Park. It was released by Roadshow Films on 10 April 2003 and made $2.1 million at the box office.

== Plot ==
The film is set in Canterbury-Bankstown and opens with the protagonist, Pauly (Paul Fenech), claiming that the following events are all true and that real names are used.

Pauly arrives late at work to find his employer, Bobo (Johnny Boxer), has hired a new delivery driver, Davo (Jason Davis). Pauly explains to Davo that Bobo is crazy from being a forty-year-old virgin who lives with his mother, but is getting married the next day to a Vietnamese mail-order bride, Lin Chow Bang (Tuyen Le), who is sneaking into the country illegally. Pauly then shows Davo the "Former Employee Hall of Shame", which features Sahib (Desan Padayachee), who was forced out for being too polite and not tough enough. In retribution for being fired, Sahib and his friends opened their own pizzeria, Phat Pizza.

Later on, Pauly gets into a traffic accident with clown mascot Ronnie Mcdoggle (George Kapiniaris), whom Pauly mocks and assaults. Dozens more clown mascots surround Pauly, forcing him to single-handedly fight them all off, after which the clowns decide to back down and Pauly flees the scene in his delivery car. Ronnie and his fellow clown mascots later show up at the Pizzeria to look for Pauly, but Bobo scares them away with his chainsaw.

Meanwhile, Davo is late delivering a pizza to a house of bikies. While looking around the delivery address, he finds a drug lab producing homemade steroids and a large amount of marijuana. He is then discovered by the bikie gang who fight with and subdue Davo. The bikies are about to kill Davo as the lab catches light and explodes as a result of Davo dropping a joint during the fight. Davo and the bikies survive the explosion, but Davo is able to escape. Back at the Pizzeria, Davo meets fellow delivery driver Sleek the Elite (Paul Nakad), who tells him how he feigns romantic interest in unattractive women so he can meet and sleep with their attractive friends. Sleek then details how he has another delivery driver, Habib (Tahir Bilgic) secretly film his sexual encounters without the women's knowledge. Sleek then asks Davo what he used to do before becoming a pizza deliverer, which Davo reveals he was a heavy marijuana user, and that he got the pizza delivery job after getting arrested for possession of marijuana and being sentenced to six years of work release due to prison overpopulation.

While Pauly is getting ready to go clubbing with the other delivery drivers, as well as with Habib and Rocky (Rob Shehadie), Sahib steals his employee uniform from his clothes line and uses it to sneak into the pizzeria and tamper with the phonelines, redirecting all incoming calls to steal their business. Upon leaving, he is spotted by a group of the clown mascots who mistake him for Pauly and beat him up. As a result of their tampering, Phat Pizza then receives a phone call from the bikie gang asking for their address. Meanwhile, Bobo is forced to stay back at the Pizzeria while a Department of Health worker performs a safety inspection, but after the worker insults Bobo's mother, Bobo kills him by forcing him into the oven. During the night out with the other delivery drivers, Sleek runs into Toula (Rebel Wilson), one of the girls he has been leading on. Toula and her friends drug Sleek and abduct him. Upon awaking, they tell Sleek that they are sick of him using them to date their attractive friends and rape him as an act of revenge.

Come the next day, Sleek is on his way to the wedding when he is attacked by a coalition of organised crime syndicates who have allied against Sleek because the mafia leaders' daughters were victims of Sleek and Habib's voyeurism. Scared for his life, Sleek calls Habib and Rocky for help, who rallies a Lebanese mob to come to Sleek's defence. However, Rocky discovers that his sister was one of the girls Sleek slept with and had Habib film, leading him to turn on Sleek and join the gangs in beating him and Habib up. Bobo, his bride and their guests discover at the wedding that the priest quadruple booked the church, causing the priest to hastily marry all of the couples. Pauly then declares in a cut-away that "At this point, all that was left to do was go and get pissed".

In the post-credit scenes, Sleek calls Bobo from the hospital to ask for workers compensation only to be fired. The bikie gang members then kill the Phat Pizza employees mistaking them for the staff of Fat Pizza.

== Cast ==
Actor	Character
Paul Fenech	Pauly Falzoni
Paul Nakad	Sleek the Elite
John Boxer	Bobo Gigliotti
Tahir Bilgiç	Habib Halal
Jabba	Davo Dinkum
Desan Padayachee	Sahib
Maria Venuti	Bobo's Mama
Annalise Braakensiek	Claudia Macpherson
Angry Anderson	Bikie
Glenn Butcher	Priest
Michael Craig	Judge
Cass Cumerford	Main in white
June Dries	Bikie babe #1
Jeff Fenech	Himself
Mario Fenech	Uncle Shiba
Tim Ferguson	David Cockerfield
Linden Goh	Lachlan
Merv Hughes	Ivan Milat
Kamahl	Manager of Phat Pizza
George Kapiniaris	Ronnie McDoggle
Costas Kilias	Dimitri
Bernard King	Leather Gay Man
Hung Le	Revenge-Crazed Gangster
Elliot Goblet	Health Inspector
Pip Mushin	Injured Mormon
Shane Porteous	Doctor
Denise Roberts	Various roles
Phillip Scott	Injured Mormon
Arthur Serevetas	Fighting Arthur Penn
Rob Shehadie	Rocky
Chris Franklin	Dazza
Krissy Stanley	The Crying Lady
Red Symons	Northern Territory Customs Officer
Krista Vendy	Green Peace Secretary
Rebel Wilson	Toula (Wilson's first film credit)
Phen Yee Sng	Ling's Father
Alex Antequera	Gay Hitman
Bruno Xavier	Young Gandhi
Tuyen Le	Lin Chow Bang
Peng Wong	Refugee Uncle
Shakir Pichler	Mafia Boss in Boxing flashback

== Reception ==
The film received a mostly positive response from critics. Adrian Martin, a PhD in Film Style, gave the film a 3 out of 5 rating, praising it for its strong, outrageous jokes, saying they elevate it above most Australian comedies. Martin also commended its energy, brash confidence and appeal to its target audience. Louise Keller of Urban Cinefile said that the film's offensive humour was "very funny" and praised it for being irreverent, high-energy and over-the-top.

=== Controversy ===
The film was a source of controversy because of its use of vulgar humour, racial stereotypes and ethnic slurs (including choco, for non-white people). Some have argued that the portrayal of ethnic-minority characters in the film links vulgarity to ethnic identity and social class. The film is also accused of disingenuously passing off its representations of ethnic minorities as satire to excuse its harmful implications. As such, it is an example of self-stereotyping, like other Australian ethnic-minority lead comedies are.

A counterargument to this that has been raised is that the film gives representation to ethnic minorities, such as Lebanese and Vietnamese people, who were previously absent from Australian comedy and that it is an example of ethnic minorities representing themselves and pushing against mainstream representations. Therefore, Fat Pizza—among other films—marks a shift in the representation of minorities in Australian media away from sensitive, serious portrayals towards market driven entertainment (Khorana, 2019). The favored reception of the film is argued to represent a large, youthful, ethnic-minority audience looking for an outlet against being minoritized in Australian media.

Paul Fenech stated in an interview "It's a very hard country for a lot of people to survive, and that's why people come to my shows, doesn't matter whether they are Greek or bogan."

== Sequel ==
The television show for which the film was adapted from went on to be renewed for another three seasons, which aired in mid-2003 (several months after the movie was released), 2005 and 2007 on SBS. A crossover film between Fat Pizza and Housos – another television show created by Paul Fenech – was released on 27 November 2014. The Fat Pizza television show was revived for a sixth season in 2019 by Paul Fenech and premiered on 7mate, November, 2019.

== See also ==
- List of Australian films
- Pizza (TV series)
- Fat Pizza vs. Housos
- Pizza delivery in popular culture
