= Caringbah High School =

Location
- Caringbah, Sutherland Shire, Sydney, New South Wales; Australia; 34°02′06″S 151°07′16″E

Information
- Type: Government-funded co-educational academically selective secondary day school
- Motto: Latin: Omnia Vincit Diligentia (Diligence conquers all)
- Established: 10 August 1961; 65 years ago
- Principal: Alan Maclean (relieved), Jocelyn Gooch (relieving)
- Years: 7–12
- Enrollment: c. 907
- Colours: Orange & green
- Website: caringbah-h.schools.nsw.gov.au

Caringbah High School is a government-funded co-educational academically selective secondary day school, located in Caringbah, in Sutherland Shire in southern Sydney, New South Wales, Australia. The school was opened in 1960 as a co-educational high school and was nominated to become selective in 1989. As of 2021 approximately 907 students were enrolled. In late 2025, the school’s principal was relieved without explanation and reference to them removed from the school website.

Surrounding schools include Endeavour Sports High School, Woolooware High School, and Port Hacking High School. Caringbah High School is the only co-educational selective high school in the Sutherland Shire.

== School campus ==
Before 2010, the school was split across two locations, the southern campus (on higher ground, known colloquially as "top school") and the northern campus (on lower ground, known colloquially as "bottom school" or "the Annexe"). The campuses were linked by a covered walkway and grassed area. The southern campus was the original site which contained an auxiliary administrative office as well as music, industrial technology, applied science classrooms and languages.

As of the 1980s, the junior years were taught in the Annexe and senior years were taught in the older buildings on the southern campus.

However, due to the unstable clay foundation of the "top school", causing the campus to begin sinking, a construction project to consolidate all of the school's facilities commenced in 2007. and was completed in 2012. As of 2010, only the "bottom school" is in use and the abandoned buildings of the "top school" have become a noted site of urban decay and vandalism. On 2 April 2013, the school hall in the abandoned southern campus was destroyed by arson. On 29 August 2015, one of the other buildings in the southern campus was the site of another fire. A year 12 student has secured $100,000 to add solar panels on the roof of the school hall, which is expected to create annual savings of $18,000.

=== Outdoor Learning Centre ===
One of the key programs the school's environmental committee "Greenedge" has undertaken is the Outdoor Learning Centre (OLC). Construction started in August 2013. It is located near the site of the former walkway between the two campuses. Students and staff both had significant input into the design, and much of the work was constructed with the help of students and staff. The OLC consists of a central "pod", where classes can be held, and 5 smaller "pods" each based on bush tucker, a xeriscape, a meditative garden, an indigenous garden and a sensory garden.

== Information Technology course ==
Students have the opportunity to complete the 'Talented Computing Program' (TCP) as an elective in years 9 and 10. The preliminary Higher School Certificate course in Information Processes and Technology (IPT) commences on the first semester of year 9; allowing students to complete 2-units of their HSC prior to reaching year 11. Completion of TCP allows the option of undertaking a first-year university level course in computing through the University of New South Wales in year 11 called COMP1917.

== Co-curricular ==
Caringbah High School provides various extra-curricular activities, such as public speaking, debating and Tournament of Minds.

=== Music ===
Caringbah has twenty-two musical ensembles, of which many compete in regional and statewide events and performances, including the Sydney Eisteddfod McDonald's Performing Arts Challenge. As a part of the consolidation of campuses, a new, "Music Centre" was created, which houses music classrooms and practice rooms, where students from music classes and music ensembles have classes, can store instruments and practice during lunchtimes and before and after school.

=== Sporting teams ===
Caringbah fields many sporting teams which compete in many sports including water polo, rugby league, soccer, cross country running, lawn bowls, field hockey, mountain biking, tennis, cricket (boys and girls) and squash.

In 2023, the Caringbah High School Boys Open Football Team won the NSW Combined High Schools Knockout Competition, winning the competition for the first time in the school’s history.

=== Dance ensembles ===
Caringbah High has 2 dance ensembles that are split by both grade and skill level. Both these ensembles have performed in a variety of festivals, such as the Synergy Dance Festival, In the Spotlight and Sutherland Dance Festival. Most of these are run by the NSW Department of Education specifically for NSW Department of Education schools. The program is open to all students from years 7 through to 12.

=== Tournament of Minds ===
Caringbah High School has competed in the Tournament of Minds for over 18 years. The school regularly enters two Language Literature Teams, three Social Science Teams and a Maths/Engineering Team. In 2006, the Maths Engineering team, two Social Science teams and a Language Literature team received honours at a regional level. One Language Literature team went on to compete and receive honours at the State level. In 2018, the Social Sciences team won at the Sydney East Regional Finals, and are progressed to the State Final

=== Green Edge ===
In 2009, Green Edge, the school's environmental committee began (unnamed until 2012). The aim of the team is to promote environmental sustainability within the school community. It has undertaken activities such as upgrading light switches to energy efficient timers, introducing a worm farm system, and a school garden. After a period of inactivity, the Green Edge team was re-established in 2015 by a Year 11 student.

=== Debating ===
The school maintains several debating teams consisting of students from all grades, participating in regional debating competitions. In 2014, and 2018 a team of Year 10 students won the grand final of the Les Gordon History Debating Competition.

=== Duke of Edinburgh Award ===
Caringbah High offers the Duke of Edinburgh Award program as a co-curricular activity. In October 1973, Prince Philip, Duke of Edinburgh himself presented the award at the school. Newspaper clippings of the Duke's visit are on display in the Caringbah High School Library.

== HSC results ==
In 2000–2007, of the 150 student cohort, on average, 11 students achieved 99+ (7%), 23 achieved 98+ (15%), and 48 achieved 95+ (31%), with over 98% of students gaining entrance into university. In 2009 student, the average ATAR was 87.8, with 60% of students achieving an ATAR 90+.

The school's HSC rankings from 2007 onwards were:

- 2007: 26th
- 2008: 20th
- 2009: 31st
- 2010: 35th
- 2011: 28th
- 2012: 52nd
- 2013: 57th
- 2014: 38th
- 2015: 36th
- 2016: 29th
- 2017: 39th
- 2018: 40th
- 2019: 48th
- 2020: 30th
- 2021: 44th
- 2022: 35th
- 2023: 42nd
- 2024: 81st
- 2025: 31st

== Notable alumni ==
=== Business ===
- Tamara Ralph – Australian–British fashion designer, co-founder of Ralph & Russo

=== Economics ===
- Anne Harding (economist) — Australian economist and Emeritus professor at the University of Canberra

=== Entertainment, media and the arts ===
- Jayne Azzopardi – co-host of Weekend Today and reporter for Nine News Sydney
- Michael Hing – co-host of Triple J's Hobba and Hing and presenter on The Project
- Mickey Kojak – electronic musician
- Neel Kolhatkar – comedian, YouTuber and actor

=== Politics, public service and the law ===
- Malcolm Kerr – former Liberal member for Cronulla
- Terry Metherell – former Minister for Education and Youth Affairs
- Iain Ross – former Judge of the Federal Court of Australia
- Mark Speakman – former leader of the NSW Liberal Party

=== Medicine and science ===
- Ken Hillman – doctor, researcher and Professor of Intensive Care at the University of New South Wales
- Susan Serjeantson – geneticist and professor of genetics at the Australian National University

=== Finance ===
- There are at least four STIR traders that have graduated from Caringbah in the past two decades.

=== Sport ===
- John Dyson — Australian test cricketer
- Clayton Stevenson — Olympian and Commonwealth Games cyclist
- Randall Goff - Olympian (water polo)

== Popular culture ==
The 2012 Australian television series Puberty Blues was filmed on location at Caringbah High School.

== See also ==
- List of government schools in New South Wales
- List of selective high schools in New South Wales
- Endeavour Sports High School, also in Caringbah
