= Neel Kolhatkar =

Australian comedian, YouTuber and actor

- Born: Sydney, New South Wales, Australia
- Education: Caringbah High School, University of Sydney
- Occupations: Comedian; YouTuber; actor

YouTube information
- Channels: Neel Kolhatkar; Neel TV
- Genres: Satire, observational comedy, race comedy
- Subscribers: 600,000 (Neel Kolhatkar); 75,000 (Neel TV)
- Views: 92 million (Neel Kolhatkar); 12.4 million (Neel TV)
- Last updated: 20 October 2025
- Website: www.neelkolhatkar.com

Neel Kolhatkar is an Australian comedian, YouTuber, and actor.

== Early life and education ==
Neel Kolhatkar was born in Sydney, Australia, and grew up in the suburbs of Hurstville and Monterey in the city's St George area. His parents are of Indian ancestry, both from Maharashtra state; his mother's family migrated to Sydney in 1962 as part of a collective diaspora of first-generation Indian migrant professionals. His father migrated in 1988.

He studied at Caringbah High School and graduated in 2011, performing well in his drama, economics, English, and mathematics courses.

After a gap year spent performing stand-up comedy, developing characters, and exploring the comedy scenes of Montreal, New York City, Los Angeles and London, Kolhatkar enrolled in the University of Sydney. He studied an undergraduate course in economics before leaving Sydney University after one year to pursue a career in entertainment.

== Career ==
=== Early career and YouTube success ===
While in high school, Kolhatkar recognised that YouTube was a place where original comedy could be posted to an audience. He would post unedited, independently produced material under the username neel30394. He began uploading monthly videos at the age of fourteen, which his has described as him simply "doing idiotic things". His third upload, Shadows, was shortlisted for the Trop Jr film festival in 2009.

He first received attention for his video Teenage Girls, which earned them 1,000 subscribers, and then for his Australia in 2 Minutes video. The latter, a video parodying different Australian personalities, increased his subscriber count to 10,000 users and received national media coverage.

Since Australia in 2 Minutes, Kolhatkar has collaborated with Playboy Fragrances in the production of a commercial for their Eau de toilette Playboy Generation. The video, featuring influencer and model Hannah Perera, was posted on their YouTube channel and featured on Playboy Australia's Facebook page. As of July 2020, the video has over 587,000 views. He has also received funding from Screen Australia and Google to produce Crossing the Line, an eight-part YouTube series ‘investigating perspectives on offensive comedy’. The series became available in full on Kolhatkar's main YouTube channel on December 31, 2019.

Throughout his career, Kolhatkar has continued to regularly post new content and in June 2016 launched his secondary channel Neel TV.

As of November 2026, Kolhatkar has 606,000 subscribers to his YouTube channel.

=== Stand-up comedy career ===
In 2009, Kolhatkar performed his first stand-up comedy routine when he entered the Melbourne International Comedy Festival's Class Clowns Competition. He won this competition while still in high school. he was later invited to perform in the Festival's Teenage Gala, a showcase of Australia's best comedians 20 years old or younger, in 2010 and 2011.

Appearing in a similar showcase in the 2012 Sydney Fringe Festival show Barely Legal, Kolhatkar also began his theatre career at the festival. He developed a one-man musical based on a wannabe gangster from the Southern Sydney suburb of Kogarah, titled The KogDog! At age 18, he was the youngest solo performer at the Sydney Fringe Festival that year.

Kolhatkar continued to experience success as a stand-up comic when he was hand-picked to perform in the Melbourne International Comedy Festival's Comedy Zone in 2013, a show at the Comedy Festival featuring the strongest emerging Australian comedians of the time. Later that year, he made his debut at the New York Comedy Festival in a show titled The Aussie Invasion. Performing at the Comic Strip Live alongside other Australian comedians Joel Creasey and Khaled Kalafalla, the show was recommended by Time Out magazine.

His next stand-up show, GENeration ComedY, debuted in 2014. Kolhatkar first performed the solo show at the Melbourne International Comedy Festival in the Trades Hall before taking it to the Edinburgh Festival Fringe. Performing at the Assembly Hall, the show received poor reviews, including three two-star ratings by Chortle, WOW247 and The List and two three-star ratings by Fresh Air and Broadway Baby.

Kolhatkar then followed GENeration ComedY with his second solo show Truth Be Told. It premiered at the 2015 Melbourne International Comedy Festival before featuring at the Sydney Comedy Festival, New Zealand International Comedy Festival, Edinburgh Festival Fringe, and Perth's Fringe World Festival that same year. Unlike his first show, Truth Be Told's run earned acclaim from a number of critics worldwide, including Australian-based theatre magazines Weekend Notes and The Music as well as a four star rating from the United Kingdom-based The Skinny.

In 2016 he presented Neel Before Me, his third solo show. The show debuted at the Perth's Fringe World Festival before featuring at the Adelaide Fringe, Melbourne International Comedy Festival, and Sydney Comedy Festival. He then took the show to comedy festivals across the world to mixed reviews; its New Zealand International Comedy Festival run received mixed opinions from comedy critic Lord Sutch of The Ruminator in contrast to its ensuing Edinburgh Festival Fringe run, which Broadway Baby gave 5 stars. A full recording of the show, performed at Sydney's Metro Theatre, was released on his main YouTube channel in September 2017. His second comedy special, it has over 670,000 views as of May 2020.

Kolhatkar began 2017 by performing at the Mardi Gras Comedy Festival Gala in February. The gala, held at Sydney's Enmore Theatre as part of the annual Sydney Gay and Lesbian Mardi Gras, featured him alongside internationally recognised comedians Hannah Gadsby, Stephen K. Amos, and Tom Ballard. After this, he presented his fourth solo stand-up comedy show #ObjectifyNeel. Performed at the Melbourne International Comedy Festival, the Sydney Comedy Festival, Perth's Fringe World Festival and in a number of regional Australian locations, the show received positive reviews from comedy critic Desiree Walsh of WeekendNotes and The Plus Ones, but only two out of five stars from The Sydney Morning Herald critic Dan Harrison. Kolhatkar ended 2017 by headlining The Comedy Store's Christmas Spectacular, performed in Sydney.

His fifth stand-up comedy show, Live, played at the 2018 Melbourne International Comedy Festival, Brisbane Comedy Festival, Perth Comedy Festival, Sydney Comedy Festival, and Adelaide Fringe. The material from the show later formed part of his third stand-up special of the same name, filmed at The Comedy Store in Sydney in November 2018. He again performed Live at these same events in 2019 as well as at the Canberra Comedy Festival and Newcastle Comedy Festival. The show's 2019 run at the Adelaide Fringe received a four out of five star rating from Silvana Weyerhauser-Maher of The Iconic Blonde.

His sixth stand-up comedy show, Harder. Bigger. Better. Stronger., was cancelled due to the COVID-19 pandemic. He was due to perform at the 2020 season of the Melbourne International Comedy Festival at the Australian Institute of Music's Melbourne campus.

=== Film and television career ===
Kolhatkar's television debut was in the No Laughing Matter Comedy Gala, a live comedy special aimed towards raising funds for Suicide Prevention Australia and the National Coalition for Suicide Prevention. The special was broadcast on The Comedy Channel in November 2013. He followed this by playing a variety of small roles in the show #7DaysLater and appearances in SBS's Stand-Up at Bella Union as well as the Australian Broadcasting Corporation's Mediacrity program.

His first major acting role was in the 2015 short film Modern Educayshun, which he also wrote and directed. Available online, it has 19,8 million views on YouTube. The video has drawn mixed responses; Mike Byrne of The Fordham Ram labelled it ‘nothing more than a stale and shallow condemnation of culture’ but Jim Weaver of Texas radio station KKYR-FM described it as ‘brilliant’. Later in 2015, he appeared in SBS's Comedy Runway pilot episode Tip Rats.

After small roles in the short film Snare and feature-length film Dark Web, Kolhatkar had another starring role in Head Above Water, a feature-length made-for-TV mockumentary that focused on a rivalry between surfers played by Kolhatkar and co-star Elliot Loney. Head Above Water premiered on 9Go! and was available on streaming service Stan until 5 January 2020.

He appeared in one episode of the 2016 television show Soul Mates before presenting the five-part documentary series Virgin Bush in 2017, produced by ABC Comedy. Later in 2017, Kolhatkar featured in an episode of Just for Laughs Australia alongside fellow Australian comedians Alice Fraser and Dave Hughes. The episode aired on The Comedy Channel on 18 November that year.

In 2018, Kolhatkar received prominent attention for his role in the Network 10 series Street Smart, where he played Uber driver Raj. Alongside the rest of the Street Smart cast, which included notable Australian entertainment figures Tahir Bilgiç, Maria Tran, and Casey Donovan, he was nominated for 'Outstanding Performance by an Ensemble in a Comedy Series' as part of the 2019 Equity Foundation Awards. The Street Smart cast eventually lost to the cast of the SBS series Homecoming Queens. Receiving poor ratings for its premiere, the show was moved to a different time slot after one episode and later cancelled after one season.

Following Street Smart, Kolhatkar had small roles in the television programs Little Sista, Pilot Week, and Sistas. He has also appeared as a principal character in Cursed, playing the role of Charles. It is yet to be released on television, but made its world premiere at the 2019 South by Southwest Film Festival.

== Other endeavours ==
Kolhatkar, along with comedian Jordan Shanks of YouTube account FriendlyJordies, co-hosts Neel + Jordan, a weekly podcast where they discuss different topics and themes from Byzantine history to modern comedy and Harry Styles' fashion. He has also founded a small business that teaches improvisational and drama skills to children and teenagers, developed from a similar practice he would engage in as a high school student during lunch and after-school hours. This business operates in the South-east Sydney area. Neel also hosts another podcast, Sex Cells, with sexologist and relationship therapist Eliza Joy Wilson.

He has also featured on Queen Victoria's single Give Us Ya Money and released a song titled Netflix and Chill, featuring Australian musicians Allday and KYA. The music video for the latter, uploaded to his YouTube channel, has over 195,000 views as of May 2020. In May 2020 he released Bounce for Me, a single released under his alias 'The KogDog'. It is available on Spotify.

In 2017, Kolhatkar spoke at NSW Youth Council's annual conference addressing the role of technology in driving social change and released excerpts of his stand-up comedy material to ITunes as a comedy album. The album takes its name from his third solo show, Neel Before Me. He later released a second set of excerpts of his stand-up comedy material to iTunes in July 2019, titled Half Hour Happy Ending.

In 2018, he was engaged by the National Rugby League as part of their campaign to re-popularise the annual State of Origin rugby league series between New South Wales and Queensland. Alongside influencer Michael Beveridge, Kolhatkar participated in the campaign #BetterStateDebate, producing a number of videos released throughout the three match series debating various topics. The videos were featured on the National Rugby League's YouTube channel. Campaign agency We Are Social also developed GIFs of him for online use.

== Style ==
Kolhatkar is known as an observational comic. He regularly uses anecdotes to "critique the normative picture of society people experience". He also employs character comedy, using tropes like cross-cultural "speech, dress or mannerisms, a high degree of irony, and blending stereotype and archetype" when depicting different cultures of Australian society. Comedian Isaac Butterfield has described his comedy as "articulate, smart, and educated", and Kolhatkar has stated he avoids aggressive expression of his opinions in his material.

Due to the satirical nature of Kolhatkar's work, his use of impressions, and political humour, some of his race-based stand-up and video content has drawn criticism. Such criticism is in accordance with the issue of using race as a comedic tool. Addressing this issue with Beat Magazine, Kolhatkar has commented that he has learnt to "revel" in that response the longer he has been performing. He also believes the criticism of his works contributes to his comedy, stating his willingness to take comedic risks because "the best comedy pushes the boundary just enough to tread the fine line between tension and hilarity".

== Influences ==
Speaking to The Partae and The Creative Issue, Kolhatkar has stated his influences include American comedians Eddie Murphy, Bill Burr, George Carlin, Russell Peters and Chris Rock. He has called Rock his “all time favourite” for his “style, energy and scathing commentary”. He has expressed an interest to work with Kevin Hart and admires comedians who are individual and truthful.

== Personal life ==
Kolhatkar supports the St. George Illawarra Dragons, a professional rugby league team that plays in the National Rugby League. He has cited Jordan Peterson's 12 Rules for Life as a highly influential book in his life.

== Filmography ==
=== Film ===
Year	Title	Role	Notes
2015	Modern Educayshun	Neel	Short film; also writer and director
2016	Snare	The Presenter	
2017	Dark Web		
2018	Head Above Water	Ricky Scrotun	
2020	Cursed	Charles	

=== Television ===
Year	Title	Role	Notes
2013	#7DaysLater	Actor 2, Dealer and Ghost Hunter 1	Three episodes: "Drama Queen", "Cowboys" and "Haunted House"
2015	Comedy Runway		Pilot Episode: "Tip Rats"
2016	Soul Mates	Cop	Episode: "Episode 2"
2017	Virgin Bush		Presenter
2018	Skit Happens	Various	Pilot episode
2018	Street Smart	Raj	Eight episodes, lead role
2018	Little Sista	Shaun	Episode: "Get Shorty"
2018	Pilot Week	Various	Episode: "Skit Happens"
2019	Sistas	Ash	Episode: "One Night (I Can't) Stand"

== See also ==
- FriendlyJordies
