= Shehadie =

Shehadie is a surname. Notable people with the surname include:

- Nicholas Shehadie (1926–2018), Lord Mayor of Sydney (1973–1975) and Australian rugby union captain
- Rob Shehadie (born 1977), Australian actor, writer, and stand-up comedian of Lebanese descent
