= Serjeantson =

Serjeantson is a surname. Notable people with this surname include:

- Kate Serjeantson (died 1918), Welsh stage actress
- Susan Serjeantson (born 1946), Australian geneticist and professor
