= Ambulance Service Medal =

- Obverse of medal and ribbon
- Type: Medal
- Awarded for: distinguished service
- Presented by: Governor-General of Australia
- Eligibility: members of an Australian ambulance service
- Post-nominals: ASM
- Status: Currently awarded
- Established: 7 July 1999
- First award: 2000 Queen's Birthday Honours

Highlights
- Total: 629

Order of Wear
- Next (higher): Australian Fire Service Medal (AFSM)
- Next (lower): Emergency Services Medal (ESM)

The Ambulance Service Medal (ASM) is awarded for distinguished service by a member of an Australian ambulance service. The ASM was introduced in 1999.

Awards are made by the Governor-General, on the nomination of the responsible minister in each state and territory. The total number of awards made each year must not exceed the following quota:

- one award for each 1,000, or part of 1,000, full-time permanent members of a state's ambulance service
- one award for each 5,000, or part of 5,000, part-time, volunteer or auxiliary members in a state
- one award for ambulance members in each of the ACT, NT and the combined External Territories.

Recipients of the Ambulance Service Medal are entitled to use the post-nominal letters "ASM".

== Description ==
- The Ambulance Service Medal is circular and of silver and bronze tones. The front of the medal displays the Federation Star superimposed on a modified Maltese cross, which is representative of ambulance services. This rests on a bed of Australian wattle. The Federation Star is surrounded by twenty-four balls signifying the twenty-four hours per day the Ambulance Service is available to the community.
- The back of the medal bears the inscription ‘For Distinguished Service’.
- The 32 millimetre-wide ribbon features a chevron or V-shaped pattern. The angles are derived from the open end of the arm of the cross. The chevrons are in alternate red, white, red, silver-grey.

== See also ==
Australian Honours Order of Precedence
