= The Killings at Parrish Station =

Australian television series

- Promotional release poster
- Genre: Crime drama
- Created by: Ben Jenkins
- Screenplay by: Ben Jenkins; Tim Pye; Yolanda Ramke; Catherine Smyth-McMullen
- Directed by: Daniel Nettheim
- Starring: Mia Wasikowska; Heather Mitchell; Xavier Samuel; Robert Taylor; Alan Dale
- Country of origin: Australia
- Original language: English
- No. of series: 1
- No. of episodes: 6

Production
- Executive producers: Mark Fennessy; Donna Chang; Andy Ryan
- Producer: Kerrie Mainwaring
- Production companies: Helium Pictures; ITV Studios

Original release
- Network: Stan
- Release: 24 June 2026

The Killings at Parrish Station is a Stan Australian crime drama which began airing on 24 June 2026. The series cast include Mia Wasikowska, Heather Mitchell, Xavier Samuel, Robert Taylor and Alan Dale.

== Premise ==
Bridging past and present, a shocking massacre at a remote research station is investigated by two detectives. Starring Mia Wasikowska and Xavier Samuel.

In 1987, detectives Georgia Cooke (Wasikowska) and Michael Thorne (Samuel) are called to investigate the bizarre and brutal killings of four scientists at the remote Parrish Research Station. They uncover a complex case involving mania, ritual, and the occult, and Georgia's obsessive truth-seeking spirals, threatening her family, career, and sanity. Thirty seven years later, a chilling new spree of murders pull Georgia (Heather Mitchell) back into this nightmare as she confronts the possibility that the horrors at Parrish Station were never fully buried.

The story is inspired by the Dyatlov Pass incident but uses an Australian setting, with locations around Broken Hill.

== Cast ==
- Mia Wasikowska as Georgia Cooke (1987)
- Heather Mitchell as Georgia Cooke (Present Day)
- Xavier Samuel as Michael Thorne (1987)
- Robert Taylor as Michael Thorne (Present Day)
- Alan Dale as Callum Parrish (present day)
- Emma Lung as Frankie (present day)
- Doris Younane as Millie Farah (present day)
- Kat Hoyos as Millie Farah (1987)
- Nic English as Callum Parrish (1987)
- Alex Malone as Kate Reynolds (1987)
- Geoff Morrell as Tony Cooke
- Rob Carlton as Snr Inspector Charlie Lockwood
- Anthony Brandon Wong as Simon Lim
- Essie Randles as Elle Hardy
- Cameron James as Damien Tovey
- Alex Lee as Kayla Paine

== Production ==
The series was produced by Helium Pictures for Stan in association with ITV Studios. It was created and written by Ben Jenkins, with writer and story producer Tim Pye and writers Yolanda Ramke and Catherine Smyth-McMullen. It was directed by Daniel Nettheim. Executive producers included Mark Fennessy, Donna Chang and Andy Ryan. The series producer was Kerrie Mainwaring. Additional production investment came from Screen Australia with finance also from Screen NSW's Made in NSW Fund. Filming began in Sydney in September 2025. The cast was led by Mia Wasikowska, Heather Mitchell, Xavier Samuel, Robert Taylor and Alan Dale with Essie Randles, Emma Lung, Doris Younane, Kat Hoyos, Nic English, Alex Malone, Geoff Morrell, Rob Carlton, Alex Lee, Cameron James and Grace Owens.

== Episodes ==
No.	Title	Directed by	Written by	Original release date
1	"Muzjiks"	Daniel Nettheim	Ben Jenkins	24 June 2026
2	"The Signal and the Noise"	Daniel Nettheim	Ben Jenkins & Catherine Smyth-McMullen	24 June 2026
3	"Moorland"	Daniel Nettheim	Yolanda Ramke	24 June 2026
4	"It's Your Kidnapping"	Daniel Nettheim	Ben Jenkins & Tim Pye	24 June 2026
5	"SOS"	Daniel Nettheim	Catherine Smyth-McMullen	24 June 2026
6	"Not Here For a Haircut"	Daniel Nettheim	Ben Jenkins & Tim Pye	24 June 2026

== Release ==
On 26 May 2026, Stan announced that The Killings at Parrish Station would premiere on 24 June 2026. The first two episodes held their world premiere at the Sydney Film Festival on 7 June 2026, ahead of the series' streaming release.

Following its Australian premiere, the series was acquired by Warner Bros. Discovery for international distribution on HBO Max in the United Kingdom, Ireland, and continental Europe.

In the United States, the series began streaming on Hulu in November 2026.

== Critical reception ==
The series received largely positive reviews. Writing for ABC News, Hannah Story named the series among the best Australian television of 2026, describing it as "compelling and original" and calling it "perhaps the best Australian TV show we've seen this year." The Guardian's Luke Buckmaster gave it four stars out of five, writing that "jumping between timelines, the pacy and pulpy series gets weirder as it goes on, with plot turns that can't help but keep you engrossed." Writing in The Sydney Morning Herald, Jared Richards also gave the series four stars, calling it "impeccable, ambitious Australian television" propelled by "a razor-sharp script filled with tension, terror, humour and a dash of existential pondering."

ScreenHub's Anthony Morris also gave the series four stars, calling it "an entertaining and well-constructed twist on the traditional outback mystery," and praising lead performances by Mia Wasikowska and Heather Mitchell as "phenomenal." TV Tonight's David Knox was another to give the series four stars, calling it "a series unlike any other local drama series on screen this year."

The Nightly's Wenlei Ma gave a more mixed assessment, writing that the series "is undeniably creepy and the mystery is intriguing enough to keep you around for the story, if not the characters," and calling it "an ambitious swing which you don't always get in Australian TV." Writing in The West Australian, Clare Rigden compared the series to acclaimed Australian mystery The Kettering Incident, describing it as a "paranormal mystery" that leaves viewers "scratching your head," and noting that "this doesn't head in the direction you think it will."
