= Rob Shehadie =

Australian actor and comedian

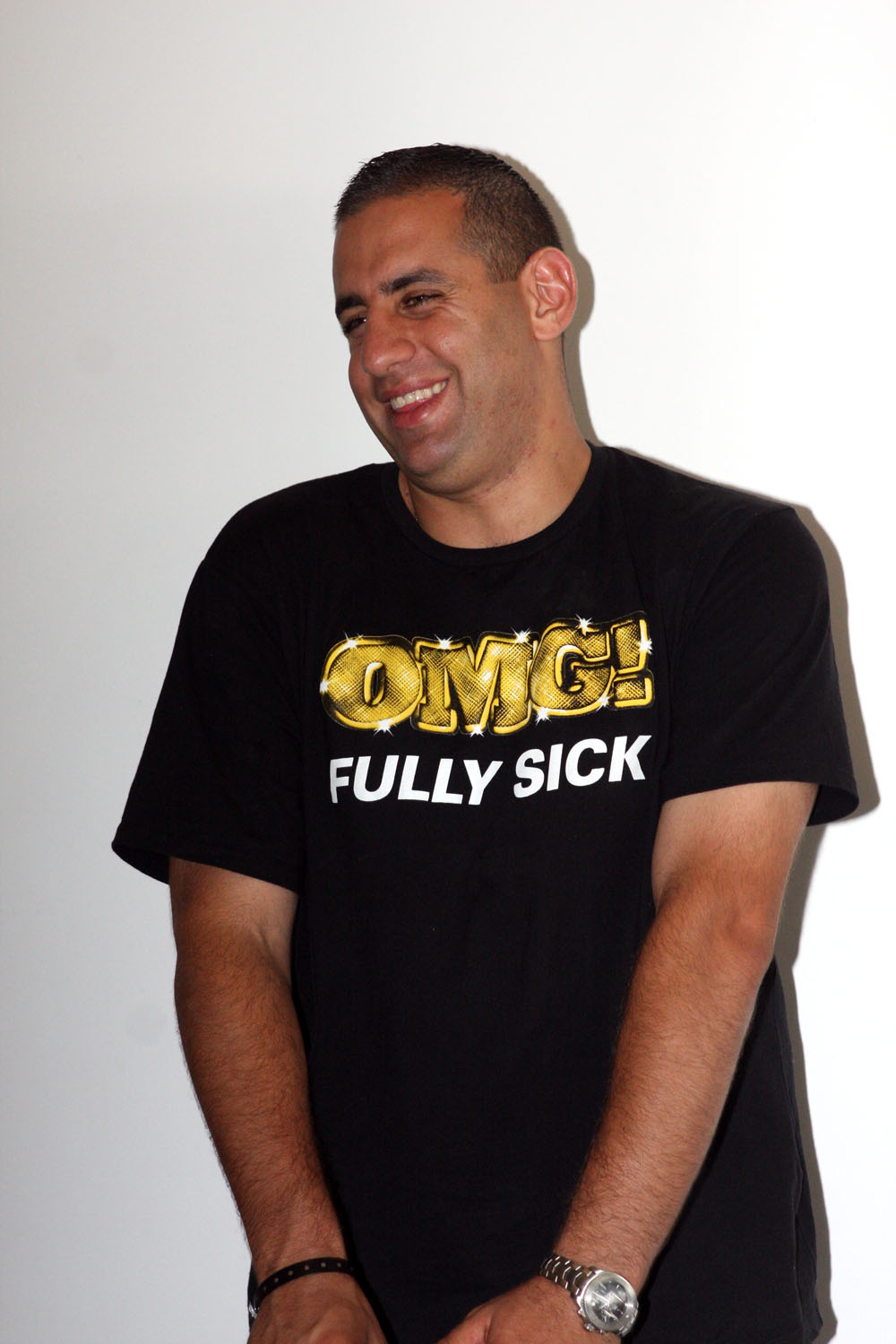
- Shehadie at the Summernats festival, Canberra, in January 2011
- Born: Robert Shehadie; 21 March 1977 (age 49); Sydney, New South Wales, Australia
- Occupations: Actor, stand-up comedian, writer
- Spouse: Jaslyn Hewitt (m. 2010)
- Children: 2
- Relatives: Lleyton Hewitt (brother-in-law); Glynn Hewitt (father-in-law)
- Website: robshehadie.com

Robert Shehadie (born 21 March 1977) is an Australian actor, writer and stand-up comedian, who has featured in television series such as Pizza, Swift and Shift Couriers and Housos. He has performed numerous stage show comedies across Australia and has made many appearances at schools and charity events. His filmography includes Fat Pizza, a feature film that broke Australian box office records and Fat Pizza vs. Housos. Shehadie and Tahir Bilgiç created the TV comedy series Here Come the Habibs.

== Biography and career ==
Shehadie grew up in Sydney and attended St Patrick's College, Strathfield. Before turning to acting, Shehadie was a full-time Rugby union player. He represented Australia/New South Wales in schoolboy, under 19s and under 21s level. He also represented Lebanon in rugby league. He was forced to stop the sport due to injuries.

His most notable appearance on television was the role of the character Rocky in Pizza and Housos on SBS. He obtained a role on the 7mate's popular series Bogan Hunters in 2014 as one of the celebrity judges.

His other appearances on Australian television include:

- Bondi Rescue on Network Ten/SC10
- Renovation Rescue on Nine Network/WIN
- Australian Idol on Network Ten/SC10
- Footy Show on Nine Network/WIN
- Here Come the Habibs on Nine Network
- Street Smart on Network Ten/WIN

In October 2020, Shehadie was announced as a competing celebrity contestant on the fifth season of The Celebrity Apprentice Australia in 2021.

== Charity work ==
Shehadie is an ambassador for Special Olympics Australia, helping athletes with an intellectual disability reach their personal best through participation in sport. He has also assisted Westmead Medical Research Foundation by supporting and hosting the My Westmead Ladies Night and the Cancer Council's Girl's Night In in 2012.
