= David Callan =

Australian comedian

David Callan is an actor and standup comedian based in Sydney, Australia. He is a former employee of ASIO; his comedy material is partly based on his experiences as a spy.

In the 2011 sitcom At Home with Julia, he played the recurring role of Agent Smith, one of the Australian Federal Police agents on the Prime Minister's security detail. In 2012, he appeared in two episodes of the TV series Rake.

== Filmography ==
=== Television ===
- Going Home (2000–01)
- Gasp! (2010–11) as Dogbox and Beetleneck (voices)
- At Home with Julia (2011) as Agent Smith
- Rake (2012) - 2 episodes

== Personal life ==
Callan is married with two children and lives in Sydney.

He is sometimes confused with Dave Callan, another Australian standup comedian with an almost identical name.
