= Kyls Burtland =

Canadian-born Australian composer

- Also known as: Kylie Burtland
- Born: Kyls Alexandra Burtland; Canada
- Origin: Sydney, Australia
- Education: Australian Film, Television and Radio School; University of Sydney
- Occupations: Composer; Music producer; Television producer
- Years active: 2002–present
- Awards: Australian Songwriters Association – Songwriter of the Year (×2); APRA Screen Song Hubs Scholarship (2019)

Kyls Burtland is a Canadian-born Australian composer working in film, television, advertising, sound installation and VR.

== Early life and education ==
Burtland is a graduate of the Australian Film, Television and Radio School, where she studied screen composition, and later studied composition at the University of Sydney.

== Career ==
=== Music and production ===
Burtland formed a production duo, Heavenly Antennas, with Josh Wermut. During May–June 2013 they provided the score for Lighting of the Sails as part of the Vivid Sydney Festival. Burtland co-wrote "Misery" with Larissa Rate, who provided vocals for the electro-pop track, which was issued to promote the festival.

Burtland is also a content creator and early career TV producer, and was one of Screen Producers Australia (SPA's) Ones to Watch in 2014.

=== Television work ===
Burtland's television work includes Bad Mothers (2019), Here Come the Habibs (2016), Whitlam: The Power and the Passion (2015), music for the Shanghai Pavilion interactive experience at World Expo 2010, music for the projections on the Sydney Opera House for Vivid Sydney (2013), and the song "Triumph of the One" for the 2006 Asian Games closing ceremony in Doha, performed by Lea Salonga.

== Awards and nominations ==
=== Awards ===
Burtland has received several awards, including twice winning Songwriter of the Year through the Australian Songwriters Association (ASA) Awards, and in 2019 she was awarded a full scholarship by composer and Song Hubs curator Ashley Irwin to attend APRA's Screen Song Hubs in Los Angeles.

=== Nominations ===
In 2002, she received a nomination for Emerging Talent of the Year by the Film Critics Circle of Australia.

In 2010, she was nominated for Best Music for a Short Film at the APRA Music Awards of 2010 for her work on Zero.

In 2016, she was also nominated both for Best Television Theme at the APRA Music Awards of 2016 for Here Come the Habibs, and Best Theme at the Asian Television Awards for Destination Flavor Scandinavia.

== Selected works ==
- Zero (2010)
- The Jesters (2009)
- Whitlam: Power and the Passion (2013)
- Rebels of Oz: Germaine, Clive, Barry and Bob (2014)
- Dawn (also known as 'Touch'), (2015)
- Destination Flavor Scandinavia (2017)
- Here Come the Habibs (2017)
- Sando
- Bad Mothers
