= 2000 Queen's Birthday Honours (Australia) =

The 2000 Queen's Birthday Honours for Australia were announced on Monday 12 June 2000 by the office of the Governor-General.

The Birthday Honours were appointments by some of the 16 Commonwealth realms of Queen Elizabeth II to various orders and honours to reward and highlight good works by citizens of those countries. The Birthday Honours are awarded as part of the Queen's Official Birthday celebrations during the month of June.

== Order of Australia ==
=== Companion (AC) ===
==== General Division ====
Recipient	Citation	Notes
The Honourable Paul de Jersey	For service to the law, to judicial reform, and to the community through the Anglican Diocese of Brisbane providing leadership and commitment in fostering greater awareness of the provision of welfare services, education and health care.	
John Theodore Ralph	For service to Australian industry as an advocate of 'continual improvement' in international competitiveness and in the strategic assessment of long term public policy, particularly in the area of tax reform, and for contributions in the interest of the wider community including social development, education, leadership initiatives for the young and charitable organisations.	
The Honourable James Jacob Spigelman	For service to the law and to the community through leadership in bringing about change in attitudes to the administration of justice for a more fair and equitable society, and to the support of the visual arts.	
John Allan Uhrig	For leadership in business, to the arts, and to the community through support for the preservation of national heritage, improved provision of health care services and facilities and as an advocate for social justice for disadvantaged members of society.	

=== Officer (AO) ===
==== General Division ====
Recipient	Citation	Notes
Robyn Archer	For service to the development of cultural life within Australia and its resultant international recognition, through her contribution as an artistic director, performer and writer.	
David Michael John Bennett	For service to the law and to the legal profession in the areas of administration, education and practice.	
Dr Richard George Brabin-Smith	For service to defence science and technology, and to the fostering of collaborative international defence science activities.	
Martin Brady	For service to the development of Australian strategic policy formulation.	
Clinical Associate Professor John Norman Carter	For service to medicine, particularly through research and policy development on diabetes, and through endocrinology.	
Murray Neil Comrie	For service to the community as the Chief Commissioner of Police in Victoria, particularly through the development of strategies to address community safety issues, crime prevention measures and crime investigation.	
Brian John Croser	For service to the Australian wine industry, particularly through the provision of leadership to industry organisations, support for education and research in winemaking, and representation of industry interests to government.	
The Honourable John Sydney Dawkins	For service to the reform of international trade as foundation Chairman of the Cairns Group, to the reform of the federal budget, education and training, and to the Australian Parliament.	
Desmond Joseph Delaney	For service to the community through the Victorian Catholic health and aged care system, particularly relating to restructuring the Mercy health care service and expanding the range and location of facilities available to Victorians.	
The Honourable Alan George Demack	For service to the community, to the Uniting Church in Australia, and to the law, particularly through the Supreme Court of Queensland.	
Professor Robert Matheson Douglas	For service to medicine, particularly in the fields of epidemiology, public health research training and development, and the development of preventive measures for acute respiratory disease in children.	
Sam Fiszman, AM, OAM	For service as a leader in the tourism industry, particularly through advancing industry-based developments and initiatives including regional tourism, infrastructure programmes and improved training opportunities.	
Beryl Grant, OBE	In recognition of service to nursing and to the community through the support and development of services and programmes for children and families, particularly in rural and remote areas of Australia.	
The Honourable Justice Roger Vincent Gyles	For service to the legal profession and the judiciary, particularly as a Royal Commissioner and Special Prosecutor, and to the community.	
Stephen Barry Harrison	For service to the accountancy profession, nationally and internationally, to administration of educational institutions, and to the community.	
Emeritus Professor John McCormack Howell	For service to veterinary science and medicine, particularly through research into copper overload syndrome and inherited muscle disease, and in the education field as a mentor, role model and administrator.	
Robert Limb	(Appointment wef 2 September 1999) For service to the Australian entertainment industry, to tourism, and to the community, particularly through support for charitable organisations.	
The Honourable Frederick McGuire	For service to the law as a Judge of the District Court of Queensland, particularly through the promotion of a culturally appropriate perspective in the sentencing of indigenous juvenile offenders, and to the community in cultural and social spheres.	
Elaine Dawn McKeon	For service and leadership in the indigenous community, particularly in North-West Queensland and through the Koutha Aboriginal Development Corporation.	
Alan James Mills, AM, APM	For distinguished service as Commissioner of the Civilian Police Contingent of the United Nations Mission in East Timor (UNAMET) overseeing security of the consultation ballot.	
Professor Henry Allan Nix	For service to the environment, particularly the conservation of natural resources, and to land management through the development and application of simulation models for ecologically sustainable land utilisation.	
Dr John Orde Poynton, CMG	For service to the arts, particularly as a benefactor to the National Gallery of Australia and to Victorian cultural institutions.	
Dr William Joseph Pryor	For service to veterinary science, particularly in the areas of education and professional development, in Australia and overseas.	
Professor Richard Bailey Scotton	For service to social reform as a leading health economist and policy analyst, particularly through the development of the Medibank scheme.	
Professor Susan Wyber Serjeantson	For service to science, particularly through research in the field of human genetics, and to academic administration as an advocate of scientific research in higher education.	
Dr Michael John Sharpe	For service to the community, particularly through church and youth organisations. and to the accounting profession at state, national and international levels.	
Glynis Emily Sibosado	For service to indigenous affairs in the areas of justice, health, education, housing and welfare.	
Professor Christopher Allen Silagy	For service to medicine, particularly in the areas of research and education, and in developments in the field of evidence-based medicine.	
Professor Milton Reginald Sims	For service to orthodontics through education and research, particularly in the area of dental vasculature.	
Dr Gregory Clive Taylor	For service to the actuarial profession, both nationally and internationally, particularly through research, and to increasing awareness of issues relating to financial management within the insurance industry.	
Geoffrey Gordon Wickham	For service to the design of medical equipment, particularly in the development of the implantable cardiac pacemaker.	
Dr Ernest John Wilkinson	For service to the dental profession as an administrator, leader and educator, particularly in the fields of public dental health and the advancement of professional knowledge about infection control.	
The Honourable Justice James Roland Wood	For service to the community as Royal Commissioner into the New South Wales Police Service, and to the judiciary as a Judge of the Supreme Court of New South Wales.	

==== Military Division ====
Branch	Recipient	Citation	Notes
Army	Major General Michael James Keating	For distinguished service to the Australian Defence Force and to the Australian Army in high level command and staff appointments.	
Air Force	Air Marshal Douglas John Riding	For distinguished service to the Australian Defence Force as the Head Systems Acquisition (Aerospace) and as the Vice Chief of the Defence Force.	

=== Member (AM) ===
==== General Division ====
Recipient	Citation	Notes
Richard William Aland	For service to the community, particularly through local government, power and water management boards, and through service to senior citizen and local support organisations.	
Geoffrey Ashton-Jones	For service to primary industry, particularly through boards and councils promoting and governing the industry, to local government and to the community.	
Dr Cameron Battersby	For service to medicine as a surgeon, particularly in the areas of education and research into liver transplantation, and to cricket administration.	
Neil Thomas Bird	For service to the urban development industry, particularly as a contributor to numerous government and non-government advisory bodies and the Urban Development Institute of Australia.	
Murray Leonard Blanchard	For service to people with intellectual disabilities, particularly through the Activ Foundation and the Developmental Disability Council of Western Australia, and to the community.	
Ronald Blanchard Brittain	For service to community health, particularly as an administrator with the Asthma Foundation of NSW and the National Asthma Campaign.	
Norman Keith Brunsdon	For service to aged care through the Anglican Retirement Villages and the Foundation for Aged Care, to the community particularly through the HM Bark Endeavour Foundation, and to the business and financial sectors.	
Emeritus Professor Christopher Bryant	For service to science communication, particularly through the National Centre for the Public Awareness of Science, the National Science and Technology Centre's Science Circus, to education and to research in the field of parasitology.	
Bruce Douglas Buchanan	For service in the fields of administration and taxation policy and reform, particularly through the Office of State Revenue.	
Adrian Henry Budden	For service to the community of Manilla, particularly as a leader in and supporter of ex-Service, social welfare, service and sporting organisations.	
Stephen Edward Calder	For service to the promotion of international relations through the Australian American Association of the Northern Territory, and to the community through land management, ex-Service and sporting organisations.	
Robert Ashley Caldwell	For service to the support of organisations for people with disabilities, particularly as Director/Chairman of the Cerebral Palsy League of Queensland.	
John Calvert-Jones	For service to the community as a supporter of and fundraiser for the development of the Australian Bionic Ear, to the Australian Ballet in the areas of administration and sponsorship development, and to yachting.	
Donald Milner Cameron	For service to the community, particularly youth, and to the Australian Parliament.	
David Frederick Carmichael	For service to the community through sporting, service and transport authorities, and to the business sector, particularly the motor vehicle industry.	
Geoffrey Arthur Cohen	For service to business and commerce, particularly in the field of accountancy, and to the community through support of organisations related to health care and social service.	
Angela Condous	For service to the community, particularly as Patron of the Advertiser/Sunday Mail Foundation and the Lady Mayoress Charitable Trust Fund Committee.	
Emeritus Professor Graham Edward Connah	For service to the promotion and enhancement of the profile of Australian historical archaeology through the University of New England, as a researcher and author, and to African archaeological research.	
Patrick Corrigan	For service to the visual arts, particularly as a philanthropist to regional galleries and through a grant scheme for artists.	
Michael John Davis	For service to community health through the Queensland Ambulance Service and the Institute of Ambulance Officers, particularly in the areas of education and training.	
Professor Richard Osborne Day	For service to medicine in the fields of pharmacology and toxicology through education, research and policy development, and to the development of guidelines for the safe use of pharmaceuticals.	
Dr Francis Gordon Donaldson	For service to education, particularly through the Association of Heads of Independent Schools of Australia, and to the community through the promotion of drug and alcohol awareness programmes for youth.	
Andrew James Dowd	For service to veterans and their families, particularly through the Returned and Services League of Australia and administrative roles with war veterans' homes, and to the community through housing, tourism, charitable and sporting organisations.	
David Nicholas Edwards	For service to business, particularly in promoting training through employer and business organisations, and establishing initiatives to improve employment and educational opportunities.	
Brian Joseph Flynn	For service to public administration and to veterans and their families as Victorian Deputy Commissioner of the Department of Veterans' Affairs.	
Councillor Deirdre Anne Ford	For service to the community of Far North Queensland, particularly in relation to childcare issues and to women's organisations through involvement in state and regional advisory bodies.	
Robert George Glading	For service to the insurance industry and the actuarial profession, particularly in the development of legislation and support for the application of new techniques in actuarial practice.	
Dr Peter John Graham	For service to ophthalmology, particularly through the development of programmes in Australia and overseas to save sight and to establish eye health care services in local communities.	
Ronald Arthur Green	For service to the community, particularly through the introduction of initiatives to streamline the administration and organisation of the Australian Red Cross, and in expanding the international scope of the organisation.	
Brian Ronald Greene	For service to secondary education in New South Wales, particularly in the implementation of innovative educational programmes, and to the community.	
Clifford Charles Grimley	(Appointment wef 3 November 1998) For service to the welfare of the aged, particularly as an advocate, through the Association of Residents of Queensland Retirement Villages.	
Professor Wayne Denis Hall	For service to community health through the advancement of knowledge in the area of substance abuse and rehabilitation, and to the development of drug policy strategies at national and international levels.	
Michael John Hannon	For service to business and commerce in the Northern Territory, and to the community.	
Dr Thomas Anthony Hanson	For service to the sheep industry through improving knowledge and control of Ovine Johne's Disease in flocks, and to the community as a fundraiser for children's medical research.	
Associate Professor John Harden	For service to agriculture through education and research in the areas of plant production and protection, particularly integrated pest management and integrated crop management.	
Anthony Bernard Hart	For service to agriculture, particularly through encouraging innovation and research in the grains industry.	
John Edward Harvey	For service to the arts, particularly as Chairman of the Australian Chamber Orchestra, to youth training in the area of business education, and to the community.	
William Ralph Hassell	For service to the Western Australian Parliament, to the promotion of business and commerce, and to the community, particularly through Anglicare.	
Victor Stanley Hawkins	For service to the aged care industry, particularly the provision of high quality care through the Australian Nursing Homes and Extended Care Association.	
Neidra Meave Hill	For service to youth, particularly through the Anglican Youth Department and GFS An Anglican Ministry, and in the development of sporting facilities and associations.	
Dr Albert Himmelhoch	For service to medicine, particularly medical education through the introduction and establishment of training programmes for general practitioners.	
Jeffrey Hamilton Howlett	For service to architecture as an architectural designer and educator.	
Dr Ian Hugh Johnston	For service to medicine in the field of neurosurgical research, particularly the circulation of cerebrospinal fluid, and to postgraduate and undergraduate training.	
Peter Edward Jollie	For service to the accounting profession, particularly through the Institute of Chartered Accountants in Australia, to the promotion of Australian trade in the Asia-Pacific region, and to the community.	
Gweneth June Jones	For service to education in Western Australia, particularly in relation to curriculum development and educational theory and practice at the secondary level, and to teacher education at the tertiary level.	
Patricia Joy Judge	For service to the community, particularly through involvement in issues affecting women, to the Anglican Church in Australia, and to people with intellectual disabilities.	
Professor Ross Stewart Kalucy	For service to medicine through the development of mental health services and academic psychiatry at Flinders University, to medical education, and to medical research and its ethical considerations.	
Christopher Byron Leptos	For service to business, particularly through the promotion of sustainable development and environmental reporting in industry, and to the community.	
Dr David Lo	For service to medicine in the Northern Territory as a specialist physician and through contributing to the development of medical services, to improving access for indigenous Australians to health services, and to the community.	
Emeritus Professor Roy Martin Lourens	For service to tertiary education, particularly as an administrator, to the teaching of accountancy, and to business and public health.	
The Honourable Douglas Ackley Lowe	For service to the community of Tasmania, particularly in the area of social welfare, to the development of health policy, and to the Tasmanian Parliament.	
John Jerome Lussick	For service to the community, particularly to New Norcia in the preservation of heritage and assisting in infrastructure improvements, and through promoting the expansion of Australian Rules football into rural and remote areas of Western Australia.	
Guy Claude Maron	For service to architecture, particularly to contemporary design, and in the management of professional associations.	
Alexander Joseph McArthur	(Appointment wef 10 September 1998) For service to international trade and relations through the Australia/Japan Business Corporation Committee and the Australia Japan Society, and to the community.	
Frances Betty Muzyczuk	For service to the welfare of children as an administrator of and fundraiser for the Sunshine Club of the Royal Far West Children's Health Scheme.	
Hilton John Nicholas	For service to the community as a philanthropist and fundraiser for social welfare organisations, to the promotion of research through the St Vincent's Institute of Medical Research, and to the thoroughbred racing industry.	
Jan Caroline Owen	For service to the welfare of children and youth, particularly through the establishment of the Australian Association of Young People in Care (now Create Foundation).	
Keith Thomas Owen	For service to multiculturalism, particularly through the Ethnic Affairs Commission of New South Wales.	
Peter Apostolos Panegyres	For service to the law and to public administration as Crown Solicitor for Western Australia.	
Shirley Peisley	For service to the indigenous community of South Australia through heritage, cultural, legal, health, welfare, religious and government organisations.	
Dr Lionel Edward Phelps	For service to education and training in New South Wales, particularly as a teacher and as an administrator, and to the community.	
Colin Llewellyn Powell	For service to rural communities, particularly through the Remote and Isolated Pharmacy Association of Australia, and to Molong through a range of community support organisations.	
Dr Peter David Pullen	For service to medicine and to the welfare of medical practitioners through initiating and consolidating the Doctors Health Advisory Service in New South Wales.	
Associate Professor Stuart Buckle Renwick	For service to medicine and surgical oncology, particularly in the development of breast surgery techniques and as a fundraiser for research, and to promoting public awareness of breast cancer.	
Sheila Dorothy Rimmer	For service to the welfare of the aged through the Council on the Ageing Australia, and as an advocate for improved services and the promotion of developing a more positive image in the community of ageing.	
Dr David Murray Roder	For service to public health, particularly in the field of population health epidemiology through the South Australian Cancer Registry.	
Murray Rose	For service to sport, particularly as an Australian swimming champion and through promoting the Olympic movement and various charitable organisations.	
Werner Oswin Sarny	For service to the development in the tourism industry of the Northern Territory.	
Professor Douglas Munro Saunders	For service to medicine, particularly in the area of infertility, to the development of standards of practice and health care for women, and as a teacher, researcher and clinician.	
Hugh David Sawrey	(Appointment wef 20 January 1999) For service to the preservation of Australia's rural heritage through the Stockman's Hall of Fame and Outback Heritage Centre, to the promotion of tourism, and to the community as a philanthropist to charitable organisations.	
Philip George Scales	For service to the community as an administrator and supporter of organisations assisting children and the aged and in the area of human rights, and to law, particularly through the Australian Criminal Lawyers Association.	
Leo George Schofield	For service to the arts, particularly the Sydney Festival and the Melbourne Festival, as a fundraiser and administrator, and to environmental and heritage conservation.	
Minna Lydia Sitzler	For service to the development of arts and crafts in the Northern Territory, and to the community of Central Australia through educational, social, cultural and political organisations.	
Anne Kathryn Skipper	For service to people with disabilities and their families, particularly as an advocate for improved services, and in raising public awareness of issues affecting on-going care and welfare of needs in this area.	
James Richard Small	For service to the community as a supporter of aged care, health, agricultural, environmental and service organisations.	
John Sherbrooke Smith	For service to the community, particularly as an administrator, through the Returned and Services League of Australia, Rotary International and the Inge Rice Foundation in the Australian Capital Territory.	
David Victor Stevens	For service to the exploration drilling industry in Australia, particularly through professional associations, and in the development of safety guidelines and training.	
Alan Leslie Struss	For service to local government, particularly through the Local Government Association of Queensland, and to the community of Beaudesert through service, agricultural and aged care organisations.	
Louisa Girling Suttle	For service to the welfare of children as a foster parent of babies with special needs, and to the Anglican Church in Australia as a fundraiser for Anglicare.	
The Honourable Justice Sally Gordon Thomas	For service to the community, particularly through the Northern Territory Winston Churchill Memorial Fellowship Committee, to tertiary education, and to the law.	
John Stuart Tregurtha	For service to the community, particularly through support for a range of service, church and business organisations, and to Australia's Celtic heritage through organising the construction of the Australian Standing Stones Monument at Glen Innes.	
Dr John Winston Turnbull	For service to medicine and medical education, particularly through the Royal Australian College of General Practitioners, and to the community.	
David Ronald Vos	For service to the development of public policy on indirect tax reform, and to the accounting profession.	
Raymond John Watson	For service to the development and promotion of Australia's surf lifesaving movement as an administrator, competition official and educator.	
John Alan Wearne	For service to youth through the promotion of Leo Clubs, to people with disabilities through the provision of a network service under the auspices of the Motor Neurone Disease Association, and to the community.	
Peter Robert Webeck	For service to public health through the Pharmacy Guild of Australia, particularly through programmes to reduce health risks for intravenous drug users, to local government, and to the community.	
Geoffrey Charles Wild	For service to the advertising industry, particularly as an administrator of professional associations, and to the community.	

==== Military Division ====
Branch	Recipient	Citation	Notes
Navy	Rear Admiral Charles Simon Harrington	For exceptional service to the Royal Australian Navy and to the Australian Defence Force as Director General Recruiting, the Support Commander – Navy and, subsequently, as the Head Australian Defence Staff, Washington.	
Navy	Warrant Officer Peter John Lyngcoln	For exceptional service to the Royal Australian Navy in the field of Sea Training while posted to Maritime Headquarters Australia, to the staff of the Commander Australian Patrol Boat Forces, and in general service within the Patrol Boat Force.	
Navy	Captain Phillip John Parkins	For exceptional service to the Australian Defence Force in the fields of Logistics and Administration, especially in the implementation of the Defence Reform Program as the Defence Corporate Support Manager for Sydney Central.	
Army	Lieutenant Colonel Mark Desmond Bornholt	For exceptional service to the Australian Army as the Chief Instructor at the Warrant Officer and Senior Non-Commissioned Officer Wing, Land Warfare Centre, Canungra, and as the Commanding Officer 1st Battalion, the Royal Australian Regiment.	
Army	Lieutenant Colonel John Anthony Crozier	For exceptional service to the Australian Defence Force in the fields of Surgical Support and Medical Education.	
Army	Warrant Officer Class One Gregory Kenneth Jack	For exceptional service to the Australian Army, particularly to the Special Air Service Regiment.	
Army	Lieutenant Colonel Paul Bruce Symon	For exceptional service to the Australian Army in the fields of Command, Integration and Recruit Training.	
Army	Brigadier Neil Robert Turner	For exceptional service to the Australian Army as Commander 8th Brigade and Commander Army Cadet Corps.	
Army	Brigadier Anthony Gerard Warner LVO	For exceptional service to the Australian Army as the Head Defence Centre – Perth, Commander 5th Brigade and Chief of Staff Land Headquarters.	
Air Force	Group Captain Roger Alan Capps	For exceptional service to the Australian Defence Force as a Consultant in Anaesthetics and Resuscitation, and as the Principal Reserve Medical Officer (SA and NT).	
Air Force	Wing Commander Charles Sean Crocombe	For exceptional service to the Australian Defence Force in the fields of Aeronautical Engineering and Logistics Management in support of military operations.	
Air Force	Wing Commander Susan Elizabeth Graham	For exceptional service to the Australian Defence Force and to the Royal Australian Air Force in the field of Administration, particularly in the implementation of the Defence Reform Program as the Defence Corporate Support Manager for the Central and Northern NSW Region.	
Air Force	Squadron Leader Robert Joseph Ralston	For exceptional service to the Royal Australian Air Force in the military and personal development of its personnel.	
Air Force	Wing Commander Mark Anthony Toia	For exceptional service to the Royal Australian Air Force as the Commanding Officer of Number 492 Squadron, and as the Commanding Officer of Number 92 Wing Logistic Operations, Edinburgh.	

=== Medal (OAM) ===
==== General Division ====
Recipient	Citation	Notes
Rudolf Alagich	For service to the community of Broken Hill, particularly the Yugoslav community, and to soccer.	
Leonard James Anderson	For service to local government, to the Saleyard Operators Association, and to the community of Finley.	
Norman Bruce Andrews	For service to the community, particularly through the Artillery Historical Trust of Tasmania and the Launceston Artillery Old Comrades Association.	
Lorna Unis Angel	For service to the community of Nowra through welfare, musical and sporting groups.	
John Christopher Anictomatis	For service to the Greek community in Darwin.	
Cecil Frederick Anstey	For service to the community of Cessnock through school, service and sporting groups.	
Gordon Gibson Arnold	For service to local government and to the community of North Queensland.	
Kevin George Aussel	For service to the community, particularly as a fundraiser and through social care and sporting groups.	
John Henry Bache	(Award wef 25 November 1998) For service to business, particularly through the egg marketing industries in Queensland and the Northern Territory.	
Geoffrey St Vincent Ballard	For service to humanitarian aid, particularly through Amnesty International as a fundraiser.	
Robyn Anne Bannerman	For service to Australian women's hockey, particularly as a player, umpire and umpire coach, and to the local community of Lithgow.	
Walter Thomas Barber	For service to lawn bowls, particularly as a player and administrator at club, district and zone levels.	
Nevil Roy Barlow	For service to local government and to the community of Bathurst.	
John Hampton Beale	For service to local government and to the community of Hawthorn, particularly through Moorfields Community for Adult Care and historical societies.	
Peter Allen Beaumont	For service to the community, particularly as a philanthropist.	
Dr Sidney Douglas Bickerton	For service to the community of Dalby as a general medical practitioner.	
Merle Bignell	For service to the preservation of local history, particularly through the Kojonup Historical Society, and as an author, researcher and editor.	
Reginald Birch	For service to indigenous affairs, particularly in the Kimberley region of Western Australia.	
John Playne Bird	(Award wef 7 May 1998) For service to sport aviation and aviation education.	
Stanley Young Bisset	For service to veterans, particularly through the 2/14th Battalion Association, 7th Division.	
Alison Markham Blackmore	For service to the community of Nowra, particularly as a fundraiser for charitable organisations.	
Ian Donald Blair	(Award wef 24 August 1998) For service to the community of Onslow through service, aged care and social support organisations.	
Albert Edward Blashki	For service to the community of Springvale through musical, youth, educational and welfare organisations.	
Raymond Allen Braithwaite	For service to the community through youth, aged care, social welfare and health organisations, and to the Australian Parliament.	
John Clifford Brice	For service to the community, particularly in the development of equestrian sports in South Australia and as a sponsor and fundraiser for sporting and community organisations.	
Baron Ainslie Brooke	For service to veterans, particularly through the Royal Australian Air Force Association.	
Cecil John Brown	For service to local government and to the community of Richmond.	
Charles Henry Brown	For service to veterans and their families, particularly through the Epping Sub-Branch of the Returned and Services League of Australia, and to youth.	
Ian Douglas Brown	For service to the community, particularly as a member of the Spirit of Australia South Pole Expedition, and to Scouts Australia.	
Theodore Alexander Brown	For service to veterans and their families through the Returned and Services League of Australia, and to the community.	
William Alfred Brown	For service to cricket as a player, selector, coach and administrator.	
Robyn Nell Bryant	For service to the child care industry, particularly through the Association of Child Care Directors (Community Based) ACT.	
Eric William Bubb	For service to rifle shooting as a competitor, coach and administrator.	
Dr Fredrick William Buddee	For service to people with disabilities through the Summerland House With No Steps, to health care programmes, and to medicine as a surgeon.	
Donald Alwyn Bull	For service to the community, particularly as Chairman of the Australian Lions Drug Awareness Foundation.	
Helen Winsome Burgin	For service to the community, particularly in the Manly Warringah area.	
Patricia Honor Butler	For service to people with hearing impairments through the Sunshine Coast Branch of Better Hearing Australia Incorporated.	
Kevin Rhodes Buxton	For service to sailing, particularly through the Belmont 16ft Sailing Club, and to people with disabilities through the Sailability/Belmont 16s.	
John Charles Capes	For service to the community through the State Emergency Service and as an advocate for volunteer representation in emergency service management.	
Nicholas Peter Careedy	For service to the Greek community, particularly through the Hellenic Sub-Branch of the Returned and Services League of Australia and the Australian Hellenic Education and Progressive Association.	
William Peter Casey	For service to unemployed youth, particularly Aboriginal and Torres Strait Islanders, through the development and implementation of training programmes.	
Brian William Chatterton	For service to music and music education, particularly through the establishment and administration of Co*Opera.	
Dr John Franklin Christmas	For service to the community, particularly through Rotary International.	
Dr Raymond Phillip Cleary	For service to education, particularly adult education through the Berry Campus of the University of Wollongong, and to the community.	
Beryl Patricia Coates	(Award wef 5 November 1998) For service to youth, particularly through the Guiding movement in Tasmania, and to the community.	
Kevin Barry Collins	For service to the community, particularly through the Australasian Native Orchid Society and the Royal Agricultural Society of NSW, and to amateur basketball.	
George Andrew Comino	For service to special education, particularly the adaptation of computer technology for people with disabilities, and to the Spastic Centre of New South Wales.	
John Anthony Conheady	For service to the community of Terang and district.	
Maxwell James Connery	For service to homeless youth as the founder and Chairperson of Stepping Stone House, Dulwich Hill.	
William Hughes Connick	For service to the communities of Goodnight and Tooleybuc, particularly through the Goodnight Irrigation Trust, school and sporting organisations.	
Bernadette Doreen Connor	For service to the arts in Tasmania, particularly through the Hibiscus Gallery, and to the community.	
Norma Vivienne Cook	For service to people with intellectual disabilities, particularly through the Community Visitors Program and the Helping Hand Association for the Intellectually Disabled (Northcote Preston).	
Brian William Cooper	For service to the community, particularly to people with disabilities, through conducting life skills training programmes and as a fundraiser for charitable organisations.	
Karen Ann Cornaggia	For service to people with disabilities, particularly through the 'New Concept' Tenpin Bowling League and the South Australian Disabled Tenpin Bowling Tournament Committee.	
Patricia Mary Cossio	For service to the community of Grafton, particularly through the Australian Red Cross.	
Peter Coughlin	For service to education, particularly in the areas of management and leadership of the school community.	
Michael Gerald Coultas	For service to the promotion of international trade and the fostering of Australian/Sri Lankan relations.	
Thelma Mary Crawley	For service to veterans and their families, particularly through the RSL Women's Auxiliary of New South Wales, and to the community.	
Teresa Croce-Benedetti	For service to the Italian community, particularly women living in the Sydney metropolitan area.	
Valerie Florence Curran	For service to netball as a player, coach, umpire and administrator through the Illawarra Netball Association.	
Sylvia Mae Curtis	For service to nursing, particularly in the area of aged care, and to the community.	
Alan Henry Dainton	For service to visually impaired people through the Baringa Centre of the Vision Australia Foundation, and to the community of Shepparton.	
Norma Mary Danks	For service to the community, particularly through the Board of Management and auxiliaries of the Royal Melbourne Hospital.	
Dr Peter John Davies	For service to golf as an administrator and competitor.	
Flora Erna Davis	For service to the Jewish community, particularly through the Sir Moses Montefiore Jewish Home and the Ladies Auxiliary of the North Shore Synagogue.	
Linda Joyce Day	For service to the community of Narrandera, particularly through the Country Women's Association and the Teloca House Hostel for the frail aged.	
Robert Jon De La Hunty	For service to the preservation of Australian aviation history, particularly through the Historical Aircraft Restoration Society.	
Antony Charles Deakin	For service to the community of Armidale, particularly in the field of architecture.	
Alick Denniss	For service to veterans and their families, particularly through the Limbless Soldiers' Association of Australia.	
Dr Eric Donaldson	For service to aviation medicine and air safety procedures, and as an educator in these fields.	
Brian Frederick Donnell	For service to surf lifesaving, particularly as an administrator, coach and examiner.	
Joseph Tancred Dougall	For service to the communities of Parramatta and Granville through sporting, ex-Service and Maltese community groups.	
Envoy Ronald Thomas Downes	For service to the community, particularly through the Salvation Army Gosford Community Services Centre.	
Major Ross William Eastgate	For service to veterans and their families, particularly at state and sub-branch levels of the Returned and Services League of Australia.	
Doreen Mavis Elliott	For service to the community of Bermagui, particularly the aged through Meals on Wheels and the Centre Based Meal Day.	
Davidson Freeman Evans	For service to the community of Boonah, particularly through the Salvation Army's Red Shield Appeal.	
Norman John Evans	For service to the community of the Bega Valley.	
Robert Brian Favero	For service to the communities of Young and Wagga Wagga, particularly through Lions International.	
Dr William Henry Feneley	For service to medicine as a general practitioner, and to the Illawarra community through ex-Service, educational and church groups.	
Paul Morris Finch	For service to veterans, particularly through the Returned and Services League of Australia, and to the community of Norfolk Island.	
Julie Maria Finucane	For service to nursing, particularly in the areas of accident and emergency care, and to the community.	
Ursula Flicker	For service to the preservation of Jewish history, particularly through the Melbourne Jewish Holocaust and Research Centre.	
Walter John Fluke	For service to the community of Coomba, particularly through church, sporting and fire fighting organisations, and to people with disabilities.	
Robert Keith Foreman	For service to youth, particularly through the Air Training Corps, and to gliding.	
Andrew James Forsdike	For service to veterans and their families through the Returned and Services League of Australia and the Vietnam Veterans Association of Australia.	
Douglas Charles Forsyth	For service to the community of Willoughby, particularly through the Willoughby Musical Society and the Zenith Theatre.	
Dr Richard Peter Freeman, RFD	For service to otolaryngology, particularly through the Garnett Passe and Rodney Williams Memorial Foundation, and through medical practice, research and training.	
Kenneth William Fulton	For service to veterans and their families through the Geelong Sub-Branch of the Returned and Services League of Australia and the Totally and Permanently Disabled Soldiers Association of Victoria.	
Mowarra Ganambarr	For service to the Aboriginal community in the Northern Territory, particularly through the development of the Rorruway and Mata Mata Homeland Centres, and to the arts as a traditional indigenous artist.	
Charles Tony Garnock	For service to the community of Bombala.	
Bourke Lee Gibbons	For service to children with hearing impairments as a fundraiser for the Shepherd Centre.	
Wolf Walter Gilbert-Purssey	For service to the community through the Australian Red Cross and the Cancer Council of the Northern Territory.	
Enid Beatrice Gilchrist	For service to the community through the publication of books and articles for home sewing, with patterns designed for Australian families and their lifestyle.	
Catherine Gluck	For service to the community in New South Wales, particularly the Jewish community, as a philanthropist.	
Aileen Cecily Godfrey	For service to youth through the Guiding movement and as a teacher.	
Ervin Graf	For service to the building and property industries, and to the community.	
Dr Alan Charles Grice	For service to the community, particularly through involvement in medical and hospital administrative bodies and St John Ambulance (Tasmania), and to providing medical care in developing countries.	
Kaydn Lawson Griffin	For service to the community, particularly through the Uniting Church in Australia, Rotary International, and St John Ambulance Australia.	
Peter John Grimshaw	For service to industrial relations in the tertiary education sector, and to the credit union movement.	
Mary Somers Grindrod-Penny	For service to the community through the Port Stephens Division of the Royal Volunteer Coastal Patrol.	
Phillip Walter Hadlington	For service to the arboricultural and pest control industries as a consultant, researcher, author and teacher.	
Harold Halvorsen	For service to the boat-building industry as a designer and builder, and to the community.	
Ronald James Harding	For service to surf lifesaving at the club and state levels as an instructor and examiner, and at national level as a carnival official.	
Michael Philip Harley	For service to cycling as the initiator and continuing administrator of the Findon Skid Kids bicycle club, and as a fundraiser for charitable organisations.	
Donald Westwood Harris	For service to veterans and their families through ex-Service organisations.	
Zelma Joy Hasselmann	For service to youth through the Guiding movement in New South Wales, and to the community of Maitland.	
Lucy Carline Heap	For service to the welfare of veterans and their families through the Victorian Branch of the Returned and Services League of Australia.	
William Alfred Heel	For service to youth, particularly through the Scouting movement in Western Australia.	
Dorothy Hilda Henderson	For service to the community through Baptist Community Services, NSW & ACT.	
Julia Henning	For service to the community, particularly through the Cavalcade of History and Fashion, and Meals on Wheels.	
Angela Jane Hijjas	For service to the advancement of Australian-Malaysian relations.	
Harry Clement Hill	For service to the development and promotion of outdoor leisure activities within the Kosciuszko National Park area.	
Margaret De Burgh Hockey	For service to the community, particularly through charitable organisations, the promotion of arts and crafts and the preservation of the local history of Beaudesert.	
Eric John Holliday	For service to primary industry as a vegetable and flower producer, to agricultural education through the C B Alexander Agricultural College, and to the community.	
John Edward Hollingshead	For service to community health, particularly through leadership of the Rotary Sight Restoration Project – Bali, Indonesia.	
Ronald Ley Hooper	For service to veterans, particularly through the War Veterans Home Myrtle Bank, and to the community.	
Muriel Agnes Hopwood	For service to the Leeton district through support of a wide range of community groups.	
Ronald Stephen Horan	(Award wef 18 February 1999) For service to education through Fort Street High School, Sydney.	
The Reverend James Hughan Houston	For service to the promotion of multiculturalism, and to the community through the Anglican Church in Australia.	
James Douglas Huckstepp	For service to the communities of Glenelg and Brighton.	
Paul Chapman Huggins	For service to the welfare of veterans and their families through the Tamworth Sub-Branch of the Returned and Services League of Australia, and to the community through the Currabubula Rural Fire Brigade.	
Barry Richard Hutchins	For service to ornithology and aviculture.	
Dr David Robert Hutchins	For service to veterinary science as an equine specialist and through the Rural Veterinary Centre of the University of Sydney.	
John Barry Hutchins	For service to the community, particularly through facilities for aged care and drug rehabilitation, and to educational and church organisations.	
Dr Gizela Huttner	For service to the promotion of international human rights through the Urgent Action Network of the Victorian Branch of Amnesty International.	
Margaret Randal Illingworth	For service to the community of Narrabri, particularly through the Australian Red Cross.	
Pamela Mary Inglis	For service to the community of Old Bar, particularly through the establishment of support facilities for the aged.	
Stanley Jackson	For service to the community through the promotion of the concept of 'fitness for life' by undertaking marathon bicycle tours, and to environmental conservation.	
Frances Shirley Jenkins	For service to the community, particularly through the Moe Youth Club.	
Donald McGregor Johns	For service to the community, particularly through the Horsham Rural City Pride Committee.	
Joan Johnston	For service to the community, particularly through health and charitable organisations.	
Frances Janette Kelly	For service to the community of Barmedman, particularly as a swimming and lifesaving instructor.	
Maxwell Austin Kimber	For service to veterans, particularly through the Australian Ex-Services Atomic Survivors Association, and to the community.	
Barrington King	For service to the community, particularly through the Murweh Shire State Emergency Service Unit, and to the management of public lands and stock routes.	
Bruce Ashby King	For service to the Australian and international communities as an administrator in the Baptist Church.	
Valencea Gwendoline Kitchener	For service to the aged through St Andrew's Support Service, South Turramurra.	
Dorothy Koreshoff	For service to horticulture, particularly the art of Bonsai in Australia.	
Margo Laurel Koskelainen	For service to softball as an umpire and administrator at state, national and international levels.	
Francis Les Kuffer	For service to veterans and their families through the Returned and Services League of Australia, and to St John Ambulance Australia.	
Joan Lang	For service to the community of Bright, particularly through organisations supporting people with disabilities and cancer.	
William Kennings Langley	For service to the community, particularly through the Rural Fire Service and the Narrandera Show Society, and to local government.	
Wendy Anne Langton	For service to ice skating, particularly as an administrator, judge, referee and coach.	
Beatrice Lawrence	For service to youth through the Guiding movement, and to the community.	
Emeritus Professor Simon Joshua Leach	For service to science, particularly in the field of protein chemistry.	
John Danvers Leece	For service to the community through the Spirit of Australia South Pole Expedition, and to the Scouting movement.	
Caroline Maria Lewthwaite	For service to the community through the Kempsey District Hospital Auxiliary.	
Frederick John Lodder	For service to youth, particularly through the Rotary Interact programme, and to the Freemason movement.	
Derek James Lucas	For service to the community, particularly through promoting experiential learning.	
Robert Stanley Lucas	For service to yachting, particularly as an administrator.	
John Lusted	For service to the community of Wyong, particularly through Rotary International, Apex and Camp Breakaway.	
Yvonne June Lynch	For service to the community, particularly through the United Hospital Auxiliaries of NSW.	
Dr Heather Evelyn Macgowan	For service to the community, particularly through the Royal Life Saving Society Australia and St John Ambulance Australia.	
John Alexander Maclean	For service to sport as a triathlete and swimmer, to the promotion of sport for people with disabilities, and the encouragement of junior wheelchair athletes through the John Maclean Foundation.	
John Falkiner Maffey	For service to education, particularly through Sydney Grammar Preparatory School.	
Richard David Magoffin	For service to Australian folklore as an author of bush ballads and songs, and to the promotion and preservation of Australia's cultural heritage.	
Evelyn Marie Maguire	For service to the community of Leeton and district, particularly through the preservation of local history as an author, and through Rotary International.	
Nancy Joan Manefield	For service to the community of North Sydney, particularly through cultural and historical organisations.	
Frank Margerison	For service to the community, particularly as an honorary auditor for organisations in the Nepean district.	
Colonel Reginald Joseph Marr	(Award wef 14 July 1998) For service to veterans and their families through the Catalina Aircrew Group, and to the Christian Brothers College (Waverley).	
Raymond Vivian Marriott	(Award wef 2 October 1998) For service to the retail meat industry, and to the community.	
Dr Theo John Marshall	For service to science in the field of soil physics.	
Harry Matthews	For service to surf lifesaving, particularly in the area of financial administration.	
Gwendolyn Ethel May	For service to the community, particularly through Christian women's groups.	
Bruce Likely McBrien	For service to the community, particularly through amateur theatre and the National Trust of Australia.	
Margaret Ann McCauley	For service to people with physical and intellectual disabilities, particularly through Dadirri Incorporated.	
Joseph McClenahan	For service to the community through Meals on Wheels, and to veterans through the Returned and Services League of Australia.	
Margaret Markham McGuire	For service to the community of the Nowra region, particularly through the provision of musical entertainment, and as a fundraiser for hospitals and progress associations.	
John Ernest McInnes	For service to local government, particularly in the area of land and water management, and to the community.	
Elvie Minnie McKay	For service to the community, particularly through the Maroondah Hospital Croydon Auxiliary.	
Brian Francis McKenzie	For service to veterans and their families, particularly through the Vietnam Veterans' Association of Australia.	
Neil James McKinnon	For service to local government, and to the community of Jerilderie through health service and sporting organisations.	
Margaret Anne McLachlan	For service to amateur cycling for women.	
Noel David McLaughlin	For service to the welfare of veterans and their families through the Returned and Services League of Australia.	
Anne Margaret McLean	For service to youth, particularly through the Disability Support Network of Guides Victoria, and to medical librarianship.	
Lindsay Alexander McLeod	For service to the community, particularly as a fundraiser for the Hazelbrook Public School.	
Ian Ponsford McTaggart	For service to youth, particularly in the provision of support services, and to the community through Rotary, Freemasonry and the Uniting Church in Australia.	
Dorothy Elizabeth Meadows	For service to the community, particularly through the Friends of Edithvale-Seaford Wetlands and the Chelsea and District Historical Society.	
Benjamin John Meek	For service to the conservation of heritage buildings, particularly through the National Trust of Australia, and to the promotion and preservation of local history.	
Peter Greville Mercer	For service to the promotion and preservation of history, particularly through the Burnie Pioneer Village Museum and the Tasmanian Museum and Art Gallery.	
Glenn Anthony Miller	For service to the community in the Mildura region, particularly through the performing arts.	
James Edward Miller	For service to classical ballet as a performer, teacher, examiner and choreographer.	
John Harvey Milne	For service to the community, particularly through the Hawkesbury Agricultural College (University of Western Sydney) and the Hawkesbury District Agricultural Association.	
Mary Moloney	For service to the community, particularly through the Wyong Hospital Auxiliary.	
Lieutenant Colonel Arthur John Moore	For service to the community, particularly as the initiator and organiser of the inaugural Reserve Forces Day commemorations.	
Silvio Moschioni	For service to the community of Thangool and district, particularly through rural fire service and sporting organisations.	
Samson Abraham Moshinsky	For service to the Jewish community, particularly through charitable, religious and cultural activities.	
Mervyn Lionel Moss	For service to veterans and their families through the 47th Battalion Association in Bundaberg.	
Brigitte Suzanne Muir	For service to mountaineering.	
Catherine Jane Mulquiny	For service to the community, particularly through the Catholic Women's League and in the area of aged care.	
Catherine Jean Nancarrow	For service to the communities of Young and Penrith, through service, church and youth groups.	
John Reginald Nankervis	For service to the community, particularly through the development assistance programmes of Rotary International in Asia and Oceania.	
Margaret Elizabeth Nolan	For service to international humanitarian aid through the New Hope Rural Leprosy Trust in Muniguda, India.	
Carmel Therese O'Brien	For service to the community, particularly as a philanthropist providing support for the programmes of social welfare organisations in Victoria and in developing countries.	
Frances Lynnette O'Brien	For service to the community through the Society of St Vincent de Paul.	
Terrence Anthony O'Connell	For service to the community through the introduction of community conferencing as a means of dealing with crime, particularly juvenile crime and misbehaviour.	
Gwen O'Dea	For service to conservation and the environment through the Mid North Coast Branch of the National Parks Association.	
Janice Mary O'Donnell	For service to music, particularly through the Cairns Choral Society.	
Kathleen Agnes O'Donnell	For service to music in the Burnie area as a teacher, and as a pianist and accompanist for community organisations and choirs.	
William Edward O'Farrell	For service to veterans and their families through the Innisfail Sub-Branch of the Returned and Services League of Australia.	
Michael Robert O'Hara	For service to the office equipment industry, and to the Business Technology Association of Australia.	
Eriks Ozolins	For service to the Latvian community, particularly as a composer for and conductor of the Brisbane Latvian Choir.	
Wilma Alice Paine	For service to the welfare of children through the Children's Protection Society, and as a foster parent.	
Ernest Pardy	For service to the fruit and vegetable industry, particularly as a pioneer in the export of fresh produce.	
Owen George Partridge	For service to people with disabilities, particularly through the Hunter Region Developmental Disability Service.	
Betty Mavous Paxton	For service to softball as an administrator and coach, and to the youth of Redcliffe.	
Dennis Percival Pecover	For service to veterans and their families through the Forestville Sub-Branch of the Returned and Services League of Australia, and to the community.	
Frank Pellatt	For service to veterans through the Nambour Sub-Branch of the Returned and Services League of Australia.	
Edna Hazel Peters	For service to children with hearing and visual impairments through the Blue Mountains Lantern Club.	
Allen Brian Phillips	For service to the community, particularly through the South Australian Sea Rescue Squadron and Rotary International.	
Luigi Piccone	For service to the community, particularly as a philanthropist providing support for educational, sporting, youth and charitable organisations.	
Rosanne Bromley Pimm	For service to local government and to the community of Collie.	
Dr Paula Pitt	For service to the community through support and fundraising activities for the Peter MacCallum Cancer Institute.	
Doris Eileen Pitty	For service to women, particularly through the Australian Women's Land Army United Association, and to the community.	
Ivy Elma Pocock	For service to the community of Noosa, particularly through the Australian Red Cross, the Anglican Church in Australia and welfare organisations.	
Doreen Prebble	For service to the welfare of veterans and their families, particularly through the Gosford Returned and Services League Women's Auxiliary.	
Michelle Ann Price	For service to people with disabilities through Camp Breakaway, and to nursing.	
William Francis Quill	For service to professional boxing, particularly to the safety and welfare of boxers through the World Boxing Council.	
Antonio Reggi	For service to the Italian community through a range of cultural, social support and business organisations.	
James Paul Rice	For service to the community, particularly as a supporter of parish councils and as a fundraiser for Catholic schools in the Australian Capital Territory.	
Gisèle Florence Richens	For service to the community, particularly through the implementation and maintenance of quality care facilities for the frail and aged in Central Australia.	
Henry George Roberts	For service to the community of Colac, particularly through the Portsea Children's Holiday Camp, the urban fire service and the pony club movement.	
Patricia Evelyn Robertson	For service to the community through the Association of Australian Decorative and Fine Arts Societies.	
Dawn Leuenza Rolls	For service to veterans and their families through the Ex-Prisoners of War Association and the Mitcham Sub-Branch of the Returned and Services League of Australia.	
Joan Roots	For service to the community of Woodburn and district, particularly through the Country Women's Association.	
Nancy Lu Rose	For service to visually impaired people as a music braille transcriber, and to the community.	
Zelda Rosenbaum	For service to the Jewish community, particularly through the Jewish Museum of Australia.	
Ruth Winifred Ross	For service to women, particularly through the Australian Federation of Business and Professional Women, and to the community.	
William Buchanan Ross APM, QPM	For service to the families of deceased police officers through New South Wales Police Legacy.	
Dr Raymond David Rothfield	For service to biochemical pathology, particularly in the areas of education and training, and to the Australian Defence Force.	
William Thomas Rowlands	For service to Rugby Union football, particularly as an administrator, and to the community of Cowra.	
Isabel Eleanor Royal	For service to the community, particularly through the Yooralla Society of Victoria.	
Gerard Thomas Ryan	For service to the community, particularly as a supporter of sporting and charitable organisations, and to youth.	
Patricia Marie Ryan	For service to education, particularly through the Catholic Ladies College, Eltham, and the Principals' Association of Victorian Catholic Secondary Schools.	
Peter Thomas Ryan	For service to sport for people with intellectual disabilities in Victoria, particularly through the Football Integration Development Association.	
Royston George Sadler	For service to youth, particularly through the international exchange programme of the Rotary Club of Epping.	
The Reverend Philipp Adolf Scherer	(Award wef 12 November 1998) For service to the Lutheran Church in Australia, and to the indigenous people of Central Australia as a linguist and translator.	
Dulcie Mavis Schmidt	For service to the community of Burrumbuttock, particularly through the Australian Red Cross, church activities, arts and sporting organisations.	
Jean Evelyn Scott	For service to women through the Australian Women's Land Army United Association of New South Wales, particularly as a researcher and editor.	
Hilton George Searle	For service to youth through the Scouting movement, and to the community of Orange.	
Robert Gordon Seiffert	For service to local government in Victoria, and to the community through service and sporting clubs.	
Grace Lilian Selway	For service to the community, particularly the frail and aged, through the provision of programmes aimed at fostering health and well-being.	
Kenneth Henry Shafer	For service to the community of Campbelltown as a supporter of and fundraiser for a wide range of community organisations.	
Margaret Anne Shafer	For service to the community of Campbelltown as a supporter of and fundraiser for a wide range of community organisations.	
Paul Arthur Shakes	For service to the Western Australian State Emergency Service, particularly in the areas of training, occupational health and welfare.	
Brother Reginald Leon Shepherd	For service to people with hearing impairments, particularly within the Catholic community.	
Bruce Albert Skeggs	For service to harness racing, to the Victorian Parliament and local government, and to the community.	
Judith Ann Skinner	For service to aged care, particularly through the Council on the Ageing Queensland, and to nursing.	
Archer Morris Smith	For service to Hay as a supporter of and fundraiser for a wide range of community organisations.	
Darryl Smith	For service to polocrosse as a competitor, coach, umpire and selector, and to the horse breeding industry.	
The Reverend Ernest William Smith	For service to the Catholic Church in Australia and to social welfare, particularly through the Sacred Heart Mission in St Kilda.	
Florence Victoria Smith	For service to the community, particularly as a fundraiser for the Royal Flying Doctor Service, and as a supporter of charitable, social support and emergency service organisations.	
Lesley Lorraine Smith	For service to the communities of Ringwood and Croydon, particularly through the Maroondah Advisory Service.	
Ruth Kathleen Smith	For service to Hay as a supporter of and fundraiser for a wide range of community organisations.	
Sadie Myrtle Smith	For service to the community of Taree, particularly as a fundraiser for charitable organisations.	
David Smorgon	For service to the Western Bulldogs Football Club as an administrator, and to the community through health, education and social welfare organisations.	
Joan Margaret Somerville	For service to swimming, particularly as an administrator and official, and to the community.	
Laurence John Sparke	For service to automotive engineering, particularly in the area of improving vehicle safety.	
Margery Pearl Sparkes	For service to the community of Cumnock, and as a fundraiser for charitable organisations.	
David Anthony Stegeman	For service to the community, particularly through the Bellbowrie and District Sports and Recreation Association.	
Brian William Tait	For service to the entertainment industry through Brisbane television, theatre and radio, and to the community.	
Peter Tavender	For service to the community, particularly through croquet as a player and administrator.	
Marjorie Joy Tomlinson	For service to the community, particularly to visually impaired people and the frail aged.	
Ernest Albert Toovey	For service to the welfare of veterans and their families through the Returned and Services League of Australia, and to cricket and baseball in Queensland.	
Sydney Herbert Toovey	(Award wef 4 September 1998) For service to the welfare of veterans and their families through the Returned and Services League of Australia and the Rats of Tobruk Association.	
Mavis Amelia Tozer	For service to local government and to the community of Inverell, particularly the aged.	
Hans Michael Trumm	For service to sport, particularly skiing as an administrator, and to the community.	
The Reverend George Lawrence Turner	For service to the Uniting Church in Australia as a minister and administrator.	
Associate Professor Giuong Van Phan	For service to education, particularly in the areas of Vietnamese language and culture, through the Victoria University of Technology and the Victorian School of Languages.	
Santo Antonio Varapodio	For service to the community of Shepparton and district, and to the fruit industry.	
Anthony William Vecellio	For service to athletics, particularly as a coach and administrator.	
Peter Laurence Vinson	For service to the actuarial profession and the life insurance industry, particularly through the development of professional standards and legislation.	
Clare Harrison Walker	For service to the community of Gunnedah and district through health, child care, social support and sporting organisations.	
Edna Walker	For service to the community, particularly the contribution to music and musicians.	
Kenelm George Waller	For service to education, particularly as Principal of Moreton Bay College.	
Elaine Margaret Walters	For service to the community, particularly through education in the area of substance abuse, and to the support of families of those affected by drug dependency.	
Carol Erna Ward	For service to nursing and community health in the East Arnhem district of the Northern Territory.	
Edward Wassell	For service to cricket as a player, manager, coach and administrator.	
Jennifer Helen Wein	For service to the community of Murwillumbah, through a wide range of social support, cultural and service groups, and to the Scouting movement.	
Jack Fredrick Wells	For service to recreational fishing, particularly in the promotion of the sport and in the encouragement of junior anglers.	
Joyce Pamela Westrip	For service to the arts, particularly through the organisation and administration of cultural events with visiting performers from countries in the Indian Ocean Rim.	
Elizabeth Mary Whittaker	For service to the United Hospital Auxiliaries of NSW, and to the community of Yeoval.	
Edna May Wilde	For service to local government and to the community of Ryde.	
Edwin Dean Wilkins	For service to the cheese industry, particularly in the areas of education and training of industry practitioners.	
Graham Phillip Wilkins	For service to the community, particularly as an administrator of social support and educational facilities, and through service and church organisations.	
Keith George Williams	For service to the community as a member of the Spirit of Australia South Pole Expedition, and to the Scouting movement.	
John Samuel Williamson	For service to equestrian sports through the pony club movement, and to agricultural shows.	
Nancy Mabel Williamson	For service to equestrian sports through the pony club movement, and to agricultural shows.	
Ronald Thomas Winch	For service to community history, particularly in the conservation of antiquarian books, to the National Trust of Australia, and to the community.	
Helen Elizabeth Woosnam	For service to education, particularly to children with disabilities, and through Children's Week activities.	
Dr Olive Wykes (Mrs Mence)	For service to education as a teacher of French, through secondary teacher training at the University of Melbourne, and in fostering educational opportunities for girls and women.	
Dorothy Lynn Yates	For service to the Gold Coast community, particularly through women's support groups and projects for homeless youth.	
Ronald Francis Young	For service to the community, particularly as a fundraiser for coast guard and marine rescue organisations.	
The Very Reverend Father Nectarios Zorbalas	For service to the Greek Orthodox Church and to the community.	

==== Military Division ====
Branch	Recipient	Citation	Notes
Navy	Warrant Officer Paulus Gerardus Nienhuys	For meritorious service to the Royal Australian Navy as the Maintenance Manager and Naval Representative of the FFG Class of ship based at Fleet Base West.	
Navy	Commander Anthony Everett Stone	For meritorious service to the Royal Australian Navy as an engineering officer in the Navy's submarine service.	
Army	Warrant Officer Class One Anthony Michael Hickey	For meritorious service to the Australian Army as a Regimental Sergeant Major.	
Army	Captain Neil Michael McNamara	For meritorious service to the Australian Army, particularly to the Special Forces Group.	
Army	Warrant Officer Class One Alan James McRobbie	For meritorious service to the Australian Army in the fields of Training and Training Management.	
Army	Captain Catherine Michelle Wilsen	For meritorious service to the Australian Army and to the Australian Defence Force as the Supervisor Army Mess for the Commander 3rd Brigade and the Commander's Mess, for the Royal Army Ordnance Corps Centre, and for service to basketball in the Australian Defence Force.	
Air Force	Sergeant David Robert Fidock	For meritorious service to the Royal Australian Air Force in support of operations.	
