= Going Home (TV series) =

- Genre: Drama
- Written by: Christopher Wheeler (head writer); Daphne Paris; Michael O'Rourke; George Merryman; Ro Hume; Dave Warner
- Directed by: Alan Coleman, Andrew Lewis
- Starring: Camilla Ah Kin; Arthur Angel; David Callan; Jason Chong; Rhonda Doyle; John Gibson; Brian Meegan; Lyn Pierse; Khristina Totos
- Country of origin: Australia
- Original language: English
- No. of series: 2
- No. of episodes: 130

Production
- Executive producers: Hal McElroy & Di McElroy
- Producer: Gillian Arnold

Original release
- Network: SBS
- Release: 22 May 2000 – 24 August 2001

Related
- Train 48

Going Home was a drama television series produced by the SBS network in Australia that aired from 2000 to 2001.

Scripted, filmed, edited and broadcast on the same day, Going Home was set in a nightly inter-urban commuter train. A group of regular train travelers are featured on their daily commute in a blend of up-to-the-minute commentary on the news and events of the day, together with the unfolding dramas in their lives. Viewer feedback was encouraged, including plot and character suggestions that were regularly incorporated into subsequent episodes.

The concept has been used later in other countries: in Canada (Train 48), in France (Le train, "The Train") and in Italy (Andata e Ritorno, "Round Trip").

== Cast ==
- Camilla Ah Kin as Najette Malek
- Arthur Angel as Stefano Pappadopoulos
- David Callan as Noel Johnston
- Jason Chong as Kwan "David" Lee
- Rhonda Doyle as Tiffany Parker
- John Gibson as Mike Cortez
- Brian Meegan as Colin Thompson
- Lyn Pierse as Pam Coughlan
- Khristina Totos as Poppy Savvas

== See also ==
- List of Australian television series
