= Kat Hoyos =

Australian actress

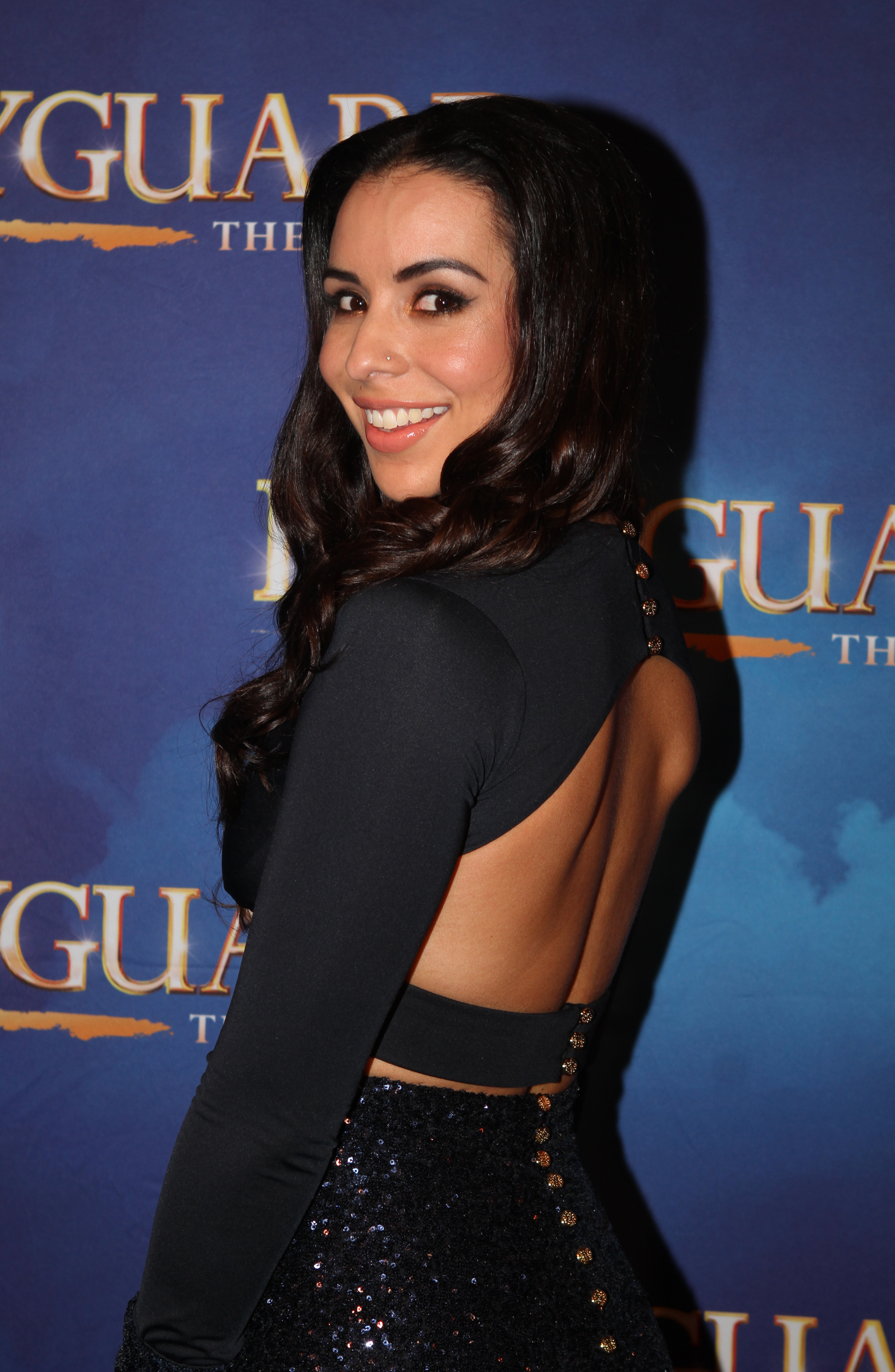
- Hoyos in 2017
- Born: 1990 (age 35–36); Australia
- Education: Mary Mackillop College; Bachelor of Creative Arts from University of Wollongong
- Occupation: Actress
- Years active: 2009–present

Kat Hoyos (born 1990) is an Australian actress. She is best known for her role in the television series Here Come The Habibs. She has also appeared in Body in the Yard and was also cast in the short film The Road Home.

== Early life and education ==
Hoyos was born to a single mother who moved to Australia from Colombia in the mid 1990s. She attended Mary Mackillop College before moving to Cronulla. Hoyos completed a Bachelor of Creative Arts (Theatre) from the University of Wollongong.

== Stage and television ==
Hoyos was featured in professional stage roles in the Australian productions of Jersey Boys, Hairspray, Bring It On, Xanadu, and Fame. Her onscreen credits include Here Come the Habibs, Body in the Yard and short film The Road Home. She has been featured in TV commercials for Bonds, the RTA, Pepsi Max, and McDonald's, amongst others.

Hoyos has performed in music clips for Guy Sebastian, Paulini, Natalie Bassingthwaighte, and worked with choreographers Project Moda, at the Annual Hair Expo for the Schwarzkopf main event. She has made TV appearances including the MTV and Aria Awards, Mornings, The Australian Open Tennis final, The Helpmann Awards, Sunrise, Hey Hey It's Saturday, Dancing with The Stars and nationally televised Carols by Candlelight. Hoyos has also collaborated with companies and events like Auto Salon, Sony Ericsson and Nike on shoots and product launches.

== Filmography ==
Year	Title	Role	Notes
2009	Breathe	Dancer	Short
2011	Mi Hermana	Aj	Short
2013	The Road Home	Sophia	Short
2015	1# at the Apocalypse Box Office	Izzy	Short
2016-17	Here Come the Habibs	Layla Habib	14 episodes
2018	El Mirador	Margot	
2018	Chasing Comets	Dee	
2018	A Suburban Love Story	Josie	
2021	Amazing Grace (Australian TV series)	Sasha Lorente	8 episodes
2025	Play Dirty	Natalie	
2026	The Killings at Parrish Station	Millie Farah (1987)	TV series: 6 episodes
