= Street Smart (TV series) =

- Genre: Comedy
- Created by: Tahir Bilgiç; Rob Shehadie
- Starring: Tahir Bilgiç; Rob Shehadie
- Country of origin: Australia
- Original language: English
- No. of seasons: 1
- No. of episodes: 8

Production
- Running time: 25 minutes

Original release
- Network: Network Ten
- Release: 5 August – 1 October 2018

Street Smart was an Australian television comedy series that debuted on Network Ten from 5 August 2018 until 1 October 2018.

== Plot ==
Street Smart follows the story of Steve who puts together a disorganised criminal gang out of his parents' garage in a western suburb of Sydney. He is thwarted by his nemesis and cousin Joseph, a professional parking inspector with the help of his workmate, Tia, a probationary parking officer.

== Cast ==
- Tahir Bilgic as Steve
- Rob Shehadie as Joseph
- Neel Kolhatkar as Raj
- Dave Eastgate as Shane
- Andy Trieu as Hung
- Maria Tran as Trans Phat
- Casey Donovan as Tia
- Simon Elrahi as Adil
- Dina Gillespie as Zena
- Neveen Hanna as Marie

== Episodes ==
No. overall	No. in season	Title	Directed by	Written by	Original release date	Aus. viewers (millions)
1	1	"All That Glitters"	Unknown	Unknown	5 August 2018	N/A
2	2	"Youth Cream"	Unknown	Unknown	13 August 2018	N/A
3	3	"Bowl Heist"	Unknown	Unknown	27 August 2018	N/A
4	4	"Pop Up Nightclub"	Unknown	Unknown	3 September 2018	N/A
5	5	"Trojan Dumpster"	Unknown	Unknown	10 September 2018	N/A
6	6	"The Great Train Robbery"	Unknown	Unknown	17 September 2018	N/A
7	7	"Trolley"	Unknown	Unknown	24 September 2018	N/A
8	8	"Undercover Tia"	Unknown	Unknown	1 October 2018	N/A
