= Camilla Ah Kin =

Australian actress (1964–2023)

Camilla Ah Kin (6 July 1964 – 9 June 2023) was an Australian actress known for her work on Holding the Man, Ali & the Ball, Going Home, and Channel 9 comedy series Here Come the Habibs.

== Biography ==
Ah Kin was a graduate of the Western Australian Academy of Performing Arts. Her work included theatre, film, and TV as a performer. In 1992, she received a cultural scholarship from the government of France to study at L’École Internationale du Théâtre Jacques Lecoq in Paris. She also completed Master of Arts (Research) with the Department of Performance Studies at the University of Sydney.

Ah Kin appeared in productions for companies including Bell Shakespeare, Belvoir, Sydney Theatre Company, Melbourne Theatre Company, WA Theatre Company (Black Swan), Ensemble Theatre, and Griffin. She had also worked as a director, dramaturge, and teacher.

In 2015, she was featured on the Australian romantic drama film Holding the Man. In 2016, Ah Kin was chosen to portray Mariam Habib in a leading role on Here Come the Habibs.

Ah Kin died on 9 June 2023, at the age of 58.

== Credits ==
Film and Television
Year	Title	Role	Notes
1996	Halifax f.p.	Nurse	Episode: "Cradle and All"
1997	Blue Heelers	Dr. Lou Rigo	Episode: "Under Siege"
1999	Murder Call	Leila Dukakis	Episode: "Death in the Family"
2001	Going Home	Najette Malek	67 episodes
2002–07	All Saints	Dr. Hana Lawson / Mrs. Hayek / Mrs. Tanner	7 episodes
2004	Stories from the Golf	Therese	Episode: "Christian Soup"
2006–08	Stupid, Stupid Man	Sandra	2 episodes
2008	Ali & the Ball	Mother	Short film
2011	Tough Nuts: Australia's Hardest Criminals	Violetta Dibra	Episode: "Dino Dibra: The Sunshine Boy"
2012	Rake	Meaghan	Episode: "R vs Floyd"
2015	Holding the Man	Lois Caleo	Film
2016–17	Here Come the Habibs	Mariam Habib	14 episodes
2018	Doctor Doctor	Ginger	Episode: "Call Me Irresponsible"
2018	Fighting Season	Counsellor Pamela Yacoub	3 episodes
2021	The Greenhouse	Ruth Tweedy-Bell	Film
2021	Wakefield	Vivienne Noor	2 episodes
2023	What About Sal?	Suzanna	Film; posthumous release

Habib
