= Here Come the Habibs =

Australian television series

- Genre: Comedy
- Created by: Tahir Bilgic; Rob Shehadie; Matt Ryan-Garnsey; Phil Lloyd; Ben Davies
- Written by: Phil Lloyd
- Directed by: Darren Ashton
- Starring: Helen Dallimore; Darren Gilshenan; Georgia Flood; Michael Denkha; Camilla Ah Kin; Sam Alhaje; Tyler De Nawi; Kat Hoyos
- Composer: Kyls Burtland
- Country of origin: Australia
- Original language: English
- No. of seasons: 2
- No. of episodes: 14

Production
- Executive producers: Jason Burrows; Ben Davies; Phil Lloyd; Trent O'Donnell; Andy Ryan; Jo Rooney
- Producer: Chloe Rickard
- Cinematography: Dan Maxwell
- Running time: 25 minutes
- Production companies: Ronde; Jungle Entertainment

Original release
- Network: Nine Network
- Release: 9 February 2016 – 24 July 2017

Here Come the Habibs is an Australian television comedy series produced by Jungle Entertainment. A sitcom featuring a Lebanese Australian family who win the lottery and move to the posh eastern suburbs of Sydney, the show premiered on the Nine Network in Australia on 9 February 2016. Despite arousing some controversy as to whether it portrayed racist or stereotyped characters, it was successful, and the series was renewed for a second season, airing from 5 June 2017.

Nine program director Hamish Turner confirmed early in 2018 that the show would not be returning for a third season.

== Production ==
The six-part series was created by Rob Shehadie, Tahir Bilgic, Matt Ryan-Garnsey, Phil Lloyd and Ben Davies. It was written by Phil Lloyd, Gary Eck, Sam Meikle, Trent Roberts, Steve Walsh. It is directed by Darren Ashton and produced by Chloe Rickard.

The score and theme were written by composer Kyls Burtland. The theme features Matuse, an Australian Muslim rapper, and was nominated for Best Television Theme at the 2016 APRA Screen Music Awards.

== Cast ==
=== Main ===
- Helen Dallimore as Olivia O'Neill
- Darren Gilshenan as Jack O'Neill
- Georgia Flood as Madison O'Neill
- Michael Denkha as Fou Fou Habib
- Camilla Ah Kin as Mariam Habib
- Sam Alhaje as Toufic Habib
- Tyler De Nawi as Elias Habib
- Kat Hoyos as Layla Habib

=== Recurring ===
- Rob Shehadie as Jahesh
- Tahir Bilgiç as Mustafa
- Pippa Grandison as Anthea

=== Guests ===
- Anna Bamford as Samantha
- Brandon McClelland as Blair
- Phil Lloyd as Commodore
- Dave Eastgate as Officer Kemp
- Felix Williamson as Lawrence
- Geraldine Hakewill as Sally
- Lucy Bell as Magistrate
- Lucy Durack as Judy
- Michael Beckley as Roland
- Nathan Lovejoy as Bobby Peeker
- Nicola Parry as ASIO Officer Karen
- Roy Billing as Alan
- Sandy Gore as Tetta
- Susie Youssef as Marie
- Tasneem Roc as UN Woman
- Taya Calder-Mason as Phoebe Priggs
- Tim Gilbert as himself
- Tom Budge as Neville
- Tony Nikolakopoulos as Jiddo
- Tracy Mann as Mrs. Plunge
- Wendy Strehlow as Border Security

== Series overview ==
Series	Episodes	Originally released	
Series	Episodes	First released	Last released
1	6	9 February 2016	15 March 2016
2	8	5 June 2017	24 July 2017

== Episodes ==
=== Season 1 (2016) ===
No. overall	No. in season	Title	Directed by	Written by	Original release date	Aus. viewers (millions)
1	1	"Here Come The Habibs!"	Darren Ashton	Phil Lloyd	9 February 2016	1.25
2	2	"Members Only"	Darren Ashton	Phil Lloyd	16 February 2016	0.94
3	3	"Civil War"	Darren Ashton	Gary Eck	23 February 2016	0.90
4	4	"The Anzaclava"	Darren Ashton	Phil Lloyd	1 March 2016	0.80
5	5	"Party Habibs Style"	Darren Ashton	Sam Meikle	8 March 2016	0.66
6	6	"The Brangelina of Bayview Road"	Darren Ashton	Trent Roberts	15 March 2016	0.68

=== Season 2 (2017) ===
No. overall	No. in season	Title	Directed by	Written by	Original release date	Aus. viewers (millions)
7	1	"Lockdown"	Darren Ashton	Charlie Garber	5 June 2017	0.83
8	2	"Go Back to Where You Came From"	Darren Ashton	Phil Lloyd	12 June 2017	0.66
9	3	"The Fundertakers"	Darren Ashton	Gary Eck	19 June 2017	0.64
10	4	"Middle East Side Story"	Darren Ashton	Phil Lloyd	26 June 2017	0.61
11	5	"The Kidney"	Peter Templeman	Sam Meikle	3 July 2017	0.64
12	6	"The Beach"	Darren Ashton	Steve Walsh	10 July 2017	0.75
13	7	"The Girl from Lebanon"	Peter Templeman	Romina Accurso	17 July 2017	0.72
14	8	"Leb Wedding"	Darren Ashton & Fadia Abboud	David Witt	24 July 2017	0.68

== Release ==
=== Broadcast ===
The series premiered in Australia on 9 February 2016 on the Nine Network.

=== Home media ===
Season one is available on iTunes in Australia. Series one and two were previously available on the 9now streaming platform by Channel Nine.

Title	Set details	DVD release dates	Features
Title	Set details	Region 4	Features
Here Come the Habibs	Discs: 2; Episodes: 6	6 April 2016	Toufic's Pick-up Lines; Layla's Guide to Doing a Selfie; Secrets to the Best Kabab; Mustafa on Why West Is Best

== Ratings ==
Here Come the Habibs : AUS viewers per episode (thousands)

Season	Episode number							
Season	1	2	3	4	5	6	7	8
1	1258	944	893	796	669	692	–	
2	826	655	638	609	640	749	719	682

Source: Audience measurement performed by OzTam

=== Season 1 ===
No.	Title	Air date	Overnight ratings		Consolidated ratings		Total viewers	Ref(s)
No.	Title	Air date	Viewers	Rank	Viewers	Rank	Total viewers	Ref(s)
1	Episode 1	9 February 2016	1,258,000	2	223,000	2	1,481,000	
2	Episode 2	16 February 2016	944,000	8	178,000	3	1,122,000	
3	Episode 3	23 February 2016	893,000	8	165,000	5	1,058,000	
4	Episode 4	1 March 2016	796,000	10	137,000	7	934,000	
5	Episode 5	8 March 2016	669,000	16	163,000	11	833,000	
6	Episode 6	15 March 2016	692,000	12	147,000	10	840,000	

=== Season 2 ===
No.	Title	Air date	Overnight ratings		Consolidated ratings		Total viewers	Ref(s)
No.	Title	Air date	Viewers	Rank	Viewers	Rank	Total viewers	Ref(s)
1	"Lockdown"	5 June 2017	826,000	10	86,000	8	912,000	
2	"Go Back to Where You Came From"	12 June 2017	655,000	15	81,000	15	748,000	
3	"The Fundertakers"	19 June 2017	638,000	15	30,000	15	668,000	
4	"Middle East Side Story"	26 June 2017	609,000	19	49,000	19	658,000	
5	"The Kidney"	3 July 2017	640,000	13	37,000	14	677,000	
6	"The Beach"	10 July 2017	749,000	9	40,000	9	789,000	
7	"The Girl from Lebanon"	17 July 2017	719,000	11	11,000	11	730,000	
8	"Leb Wedding"	24 July 2017	682,000	11	19,000	12	701,000	
