= Jason Chong =

Australian actor

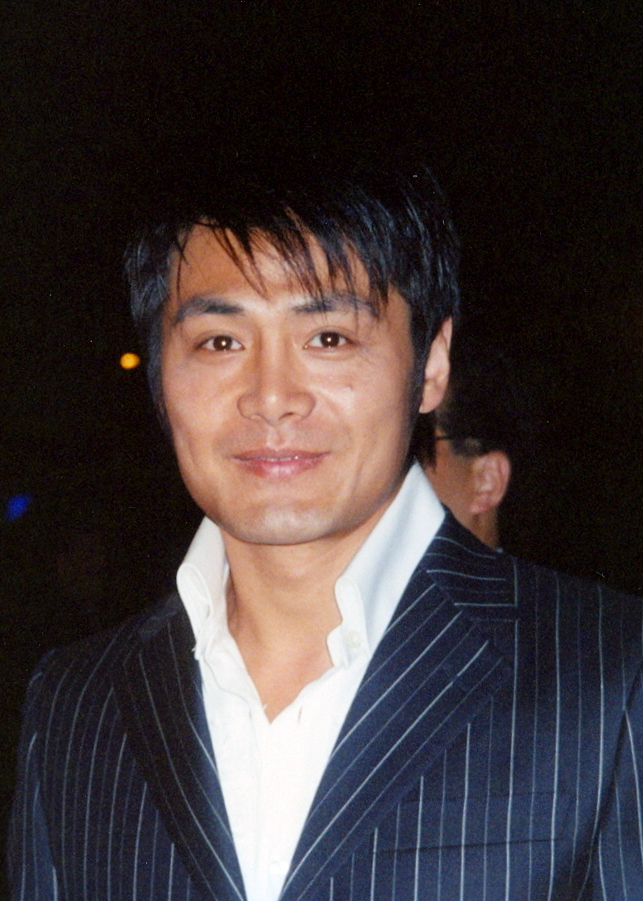
Chong in 2005

Jason Chong (born 29 October 1969) is an Australian actor.

Chong was born in Sydney and graduated from the National Institute of Dramatic Art (NIDA), Australia. He is frequently seen on television; his credits include: Wildside, Bondi Banquet, Murder Call, Going Home, Farscape, All Saints and Maximum Choppage. In 2006, Chong played a news reporter in the American horror movie, See No Evil.

He plays the recurring role of General Kasar in Netflix's series Marco Polo.

Chong played the lead Chinese role of Zhang Lin in Sydney Theatre Company's 2017 production of Chimerica at the Roslyn Packer Theatre.

In 2021, Chong starred in the voice role of Andy Ling in Space Nova.

== Filmography ==
=== Film ===
Year	Title	Role	Type
1997	The Hostages	Du Van Hoc	TV movie
1998	Never Tell Me Never	Jason	TV movie
1999	The Dark Redemption	Klaus Vanderon	Short film
1999	In the Red	Bobbi	Feature film
2000	Dr Jekyll and Mr Hyde	Ah Yee	TV movie
2000	Better Than Sex	Guy D	Feature film
2001	Hard Knox	Jackson	TV movie
2002	The Pact	Detective Moeller	Feature film
2003	The Twins Effect (aka Chin Gei Bin)	Jackie Chan English revoice)	Feature film
2003	Mermaids	Carlo	TV movie
2005	Little Fish	Mingh	Feature film
2005	The Myth (aka San Wa)	Jack / General Meng Yi (English revoice)	Feature film
2006	See No Evil	News reporter	Feature film
2006	Five Moments of Infidelity	Danny / Mitchell's gay lover	Anthology film (segment 3)
2008	The Forbidden Kingdom	Lu Yan / Old Hop (uncredited)	Feature film
2018	Guardians of the Tomb	Chen Xu	Feature film
2018	Black Lips	Homg Feng	Short film
2019	Little Monsters	Lieutenant	Feature film
TBA	Bed Frame	Damian	Short film

=== Television ===
Year	Title	Role	Type
1994	Time Trax	Yakuza #2	TV series, 1 episode
1998	Murder Call	Claude Wang	TV series, 1 episode
1998	Wildside	Tuan Ma	TV series, Season 1, episodes 21-22
1999	Bondi Banquet	Yao Ming De	TV series
2000-01	Going Home	Kwan David Lee	TV series, 67 episodes
2001	The Bill	Joey Tranh	TV series, 1 episode
2001-02	The Lost World	Arjax / Roac	TV miniseries, 2 episodes
2002	Bad Cop, Bad Cop	Kenneth L Fook	TV series, 1 episode
2002-03	Farscape	General Rahzaro / E'Alet	TV series, 3 episodes
2004-05	All Saints	Dr Oscar Wu	TV series, Season 7, 4 episodes
2007	The Starter Wife	Rickshaw Driver	TV miniseries, 1 episode
2008	Satisfaction	Peter Yuan	TV series, 3 episodes
2008	Blue Water High	Angus Li	TV series, 3 episodes
2009	Sea Patrol	Jaya	TV series, 1 episode
2011	Crownies	Adam Long	TV series, 1 episode
2011	Terra Nova	Arthur Chang	TV series, 2 episodes
2012-13	Dance Academy	Raf	TV series, 5 episodes
2013	Serangoon Road	Lim Chee Kit	TV series, 2 episodes
2015	Maximum Choppage	Pump’d	TV miniseries, 6 episodes
2015	Home and Away	Dr Chan	TV series, 1 episode
2016	Janet King	Bao Long	TV series, 2 episodes
2016	Marco Polo	General Kasar	TV series, 3 episodes
2017	Wolf Creek	Steve Cham	TV series, Season 2, 4 episodes
2018	Bite Club	Detective Wong	TV series, 1 episode
2018	Pine Gap	Zhou Lin	TV miniseries, 6 episodes
2019	Ms Fisher's Modern Murder Mysteries	Tony Wu	TV series, 1 episode
2019	SeaChange	Phil Tran	TV series, 1 episode
2020	The New Legends of Monkey	Kimira One Eye	TV series, 3, episodes
2020-21	Space Nova	Andy Ling (voice role)	Animated TV series, 10 episodes
2020-22	Grey Nomads	Stephen Boyce	TV series, 12 episodes
2023	Kangaroo Beach	Sid/Lin (voice role)	Animated TV series, 8 episodes
2023	The Messenger	Henry Tan	TV miniseries, 2 episodes
2024	Return To Paradise (TV series) Ep: Curl Up & Dye	Troy Luxton	TV miniseries, S1, E3

== Theatre ==
Year	Title	Role	Company / Venue
2017	Chimerica	Zhang Lin	Sydney Theatre Company at Roslyn Packer Theatre
