= Susan Serjeantson =

Australian geneticist

Susan Serjeantson AO
- Born: Susan Wyber; 1946 (age 79–80); Riverstone, New South Wales, Australia
- Other name: Susan Wyber Serjeantson
- Education: University of NSW, University of Hawaiʻi
- Scientific career
- Fields: Genetics
- Workplaces: John Curtin School of Medical Research

Susan Wyber Serjeantson AO (born 1946) is an Australian geneticist and professor of genetics at the John Curtin School of Medical Research at the Australian National University.

== Academic career ==
Born Susan Wyber in 1946 in Riverstone, New South Wales, Serjeantson was educated at Caringbah High School. She was dux and school captain in 1963.

Serjeantson completed a BSc at the University of New South Wales in 1967. In 1970, she graduated from the University of Hawaiʻi with a PhD.

She joined the Australian National University (ANU) in 1976 as a research fellow in the John Curtin School of Medical Research. She was appointed full professor in 1988 and in 1993 became Deputy Vice-Chancellor of ANU and Director of its Institute of Advanced Studies. She resigned in 1997 and took up a visiting fellowship there. She was executive secretary of the Australian Academy of Science from 2001.

In 1994, she was interviewed by Ann Moyal and included as one of three women in Portraits In Science.

== Honours and recognition ==
Serjeantson was awarded the Clunies Ross Award for Science and Technology in 1992. In that year she gave Ruth Sanger oration and was made a life member of the Australian and New Zealand Society of Blood Transfusion.

In the 2000 Queen's Birthday Honours, Serjeantson was made an Officer of the Order of Australia "service to science, particularly through research in the field of human genetics, and to academic administration as an advocate of scientific research in higher education".

Serjeantson was awarded the 2008 Academy Medal by the Australian Academy of Science.

== Selected works ==
- Rawlinson, W. D.; Basten, A.; Britton, W. J.; Serjeantson, Susan W. (1988), "Leprosy and immunity: Genetics and immune function in multiple case families", Immunology and Cell Biology, 66 (Pt 1) (published 1987): 9–21, doi:10.1038/icb.1988.2, PMID 3286485, S2CID 11989860
- Hill, Adrian V. S.; Serjeantson, Susan W., eds. (1989), The Colonization of the Pacific: A genetic trail, Clarendon Press; New York : Oxford University Press, ISBN 978-0-19-857695-2
- Kamboh, M. I.; Serjeantson, Susan W.; Ferrell, R. E. (1991), "Genetic studies of human apolipoproteins. XVIII. apolipoprotein polymorphisms in Australian Aborigines", Human Biology, 63 (2): 179–86, PMID 2019410
- Serjeantson, Susan W.; Ward, Gerard R., eds. (2002), And Then the Engines Stopped Flying in Papua New Guinea, Pandanus Books, ISBN 978-1-74076-005-8
