= Information processes and technology =

NSW HSC elective course

Information processes and technology (IPT) is the study of information systems and the processes and technology involved in them. IPT is also a subject offered to senior high school students in Australia in university entrance exams such as the HSC in New South Wales. It focuses on giving the student an understanding of information technology, information processes and the skills to create information systems and some basic programming skills. Some of the social and ethical issues of computer systems may also be included in the course of the subject.

In New South Wales, IPT is separated into the preliminary (year 11) and HSC (year 12) courses. A prerequisite for the HSC course is successful completion of the preliminary course. In June 2009 the course from 2010 to 2018 was detailed in the NSW Board of Studies syllabus, which was renamed to the New South Wales Education Standards Authority (NESA) from 2019. IPT is one of the HSC courses which may be accelerated – students in some schools have the option of completing it in year 10.

In Queensland, the information processing and technology course is defined in a Queensland Studies Authority document.
