= Tournament of Minds =

Australian academic competition

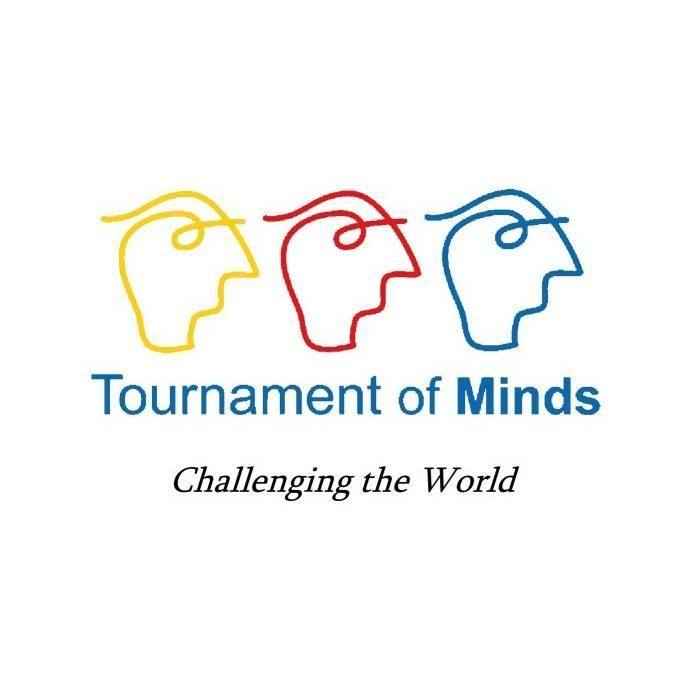
- Founded: 1987; 38 years ago in Australia
- Headquarters: Australia
- Number of locations: 17 branches (2022)
- Website: tom.edu.au

Tournament of Minds (TOM) is an academic competition focusing on collaborative problem solving and critical thinking. It is open to both primary and secondary students in Australia, New Zealand, South Africa and a number of other locations in Asia, Africa and the Middle East. Students work in a team to create a dramatic performance outlining their solution to an open-ended Long Term challenge in one of four disciplines: STEM, Language Literature, The Arts and Social Science. Students also participate in a shorter, unseen Spontaneous Challenge on the day of the Tournament. TOM Challenge Release, Regionals and Branch Finals take place during Australian Term 3, with successful teams coming together for an International Final in a chosen state or territory.

== History ==
Tournament of Minds was founded in Australia in 1987, when a group of educators came together to develop a program through which to develop creative thinking and collaborative problem solving within students. The concept of a competition was floated, and quickly took off, with schools and educational institutions across the country signing up to take part in the Tournament. Over the years, TOM has undergone a number of changes, including the development of additional 'disciplines' for students to participate in, and the establishment of branches outside of Australia, including in New Zealand, South Africa, Thailand, Hong Kong, Uganda, Egypt, and the UAE, alongside a number of others.

== Disciplines ==
Tournament of Minds is divided up into four separate competition disciplines. As of 2022, the disciples are: the arts, language literature, social sciences and science, technology, engineering, mathematics (STEM). The arts is the most recently added discipline, having been added in 2018. Previously, the STEM discipline had been divided into engineering maths and science technology or applied technology.

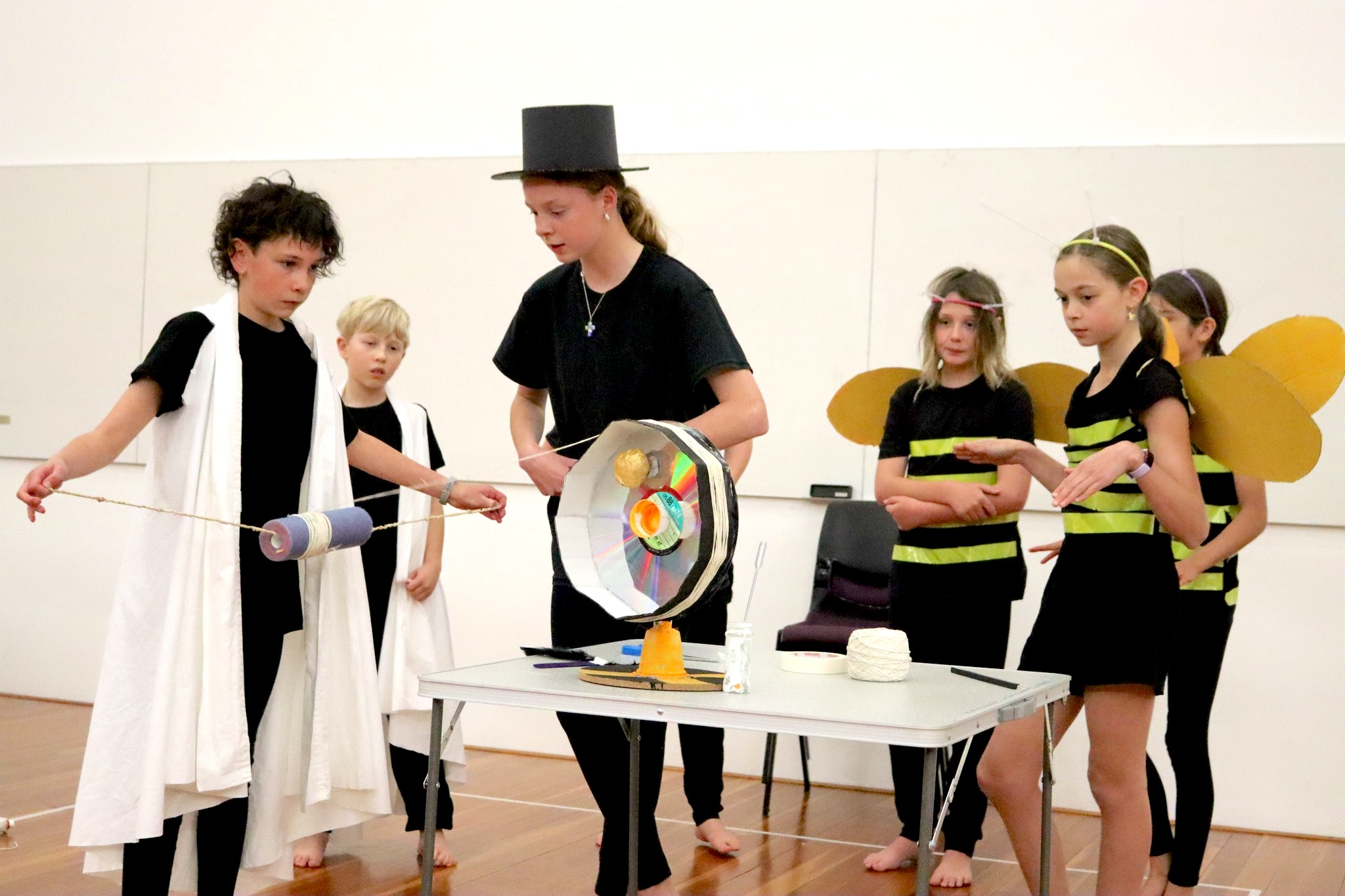
A STEM team presenting at Tournament of Minds Perth Regionals in 2022

== Competition structure ==
The competition operates in a number of difference branches. Each state and territory in Australia operates as an individual branch, as does each other country participating. Students compete in teams of five to seven students in either the Primary division or the Secondary division. The age of the students in each division varies slightly according to local school systems.

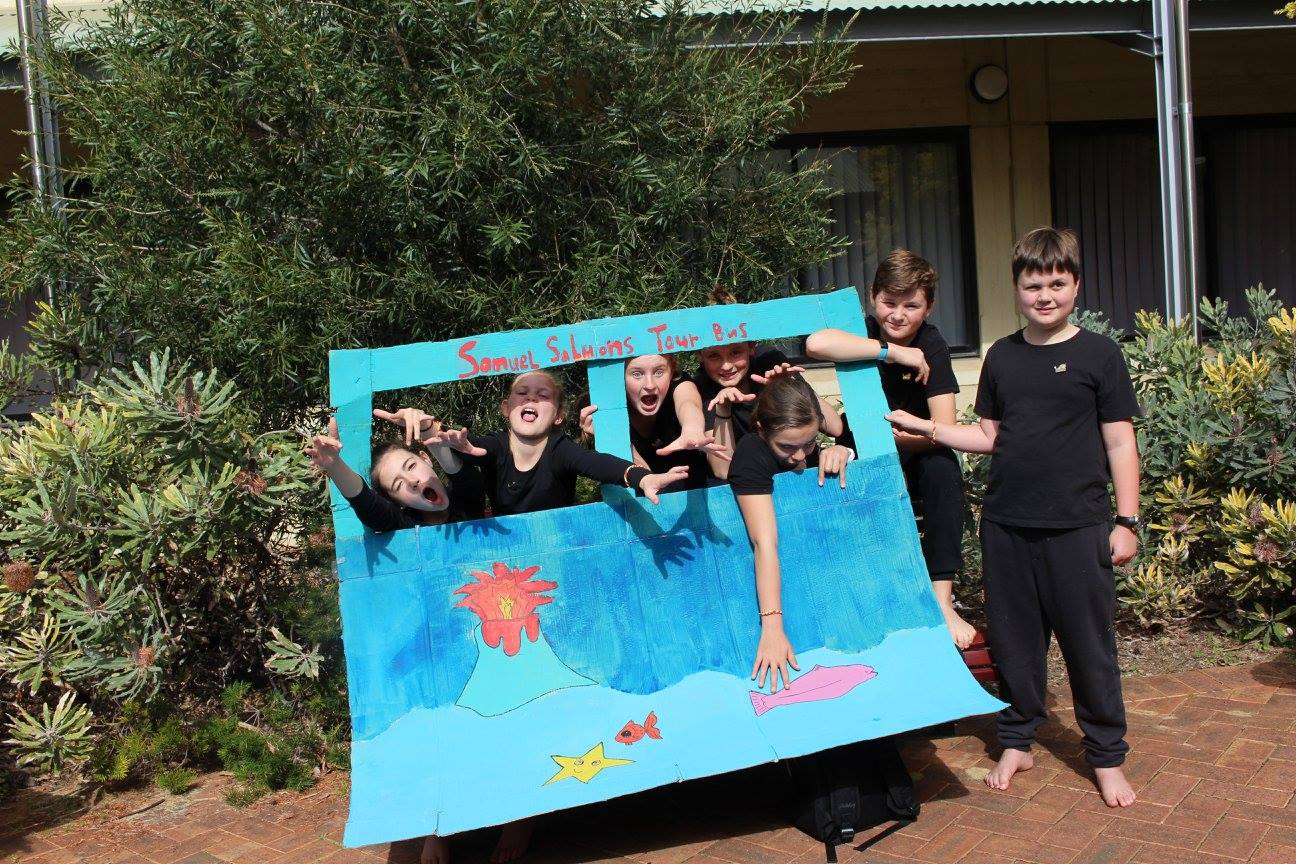
A team of students at the Tournament of Minds Perth Regional event in 2017

Schools in the majority of branches receive their long term challenge in the first weeks of Term 3 in the Australian academic year. They have six weeks to prepare their response without any assistance from people outside of their team. Students must make all props, costumes and any STEM device required using recycled materials as outlined in the TOM Instruction Manual. Students must be prepared to present their solution within a 3x3m square and ensure that at least four team members are within the square at any given time during their performance.

The six weeks of preparation time culminates in a Regional Final, often held at a participating high school or at a university. Students present the solution to their Long Term Challenge to a panel of judges as well as any supporters or competitors who wish to watch. The Spontaneous Challenge is completed separately with only a judging panel present.

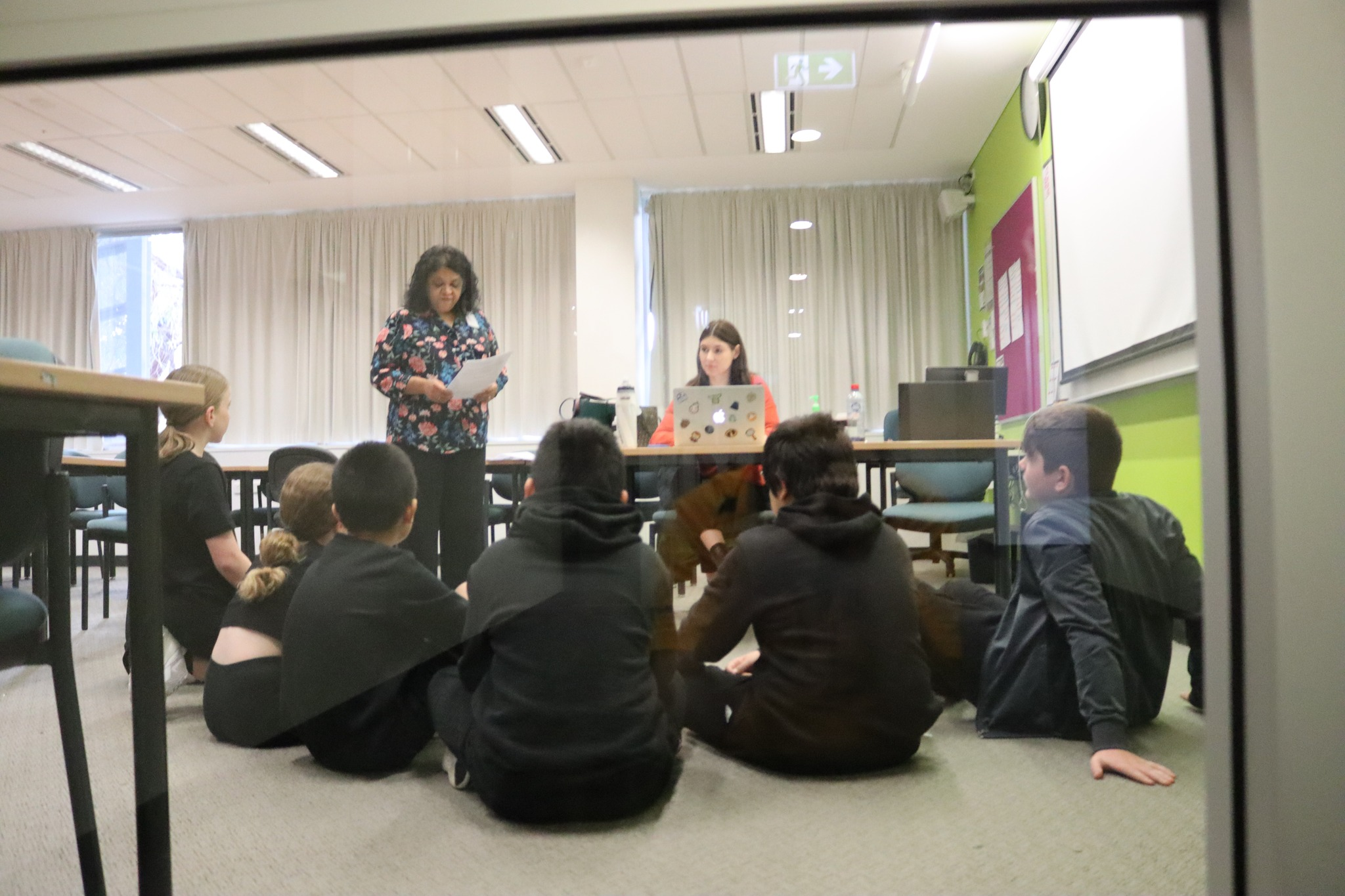
A Tournament of Minds team participating in a Spontaneous Challenge at the 2022 Perth Regional event

In larger branches, such as New South Wales, Queensland, Victoria, Western Australia and New Zealand, successful teams from this regional event are invited to participate in a Branch Final. The Branch Final allows teams three hours to create a ten-minute dramatic presentation outlining their solution to a different challenge in their Discipline. During their preparation time, they also complete another Spontaneous Challenge.

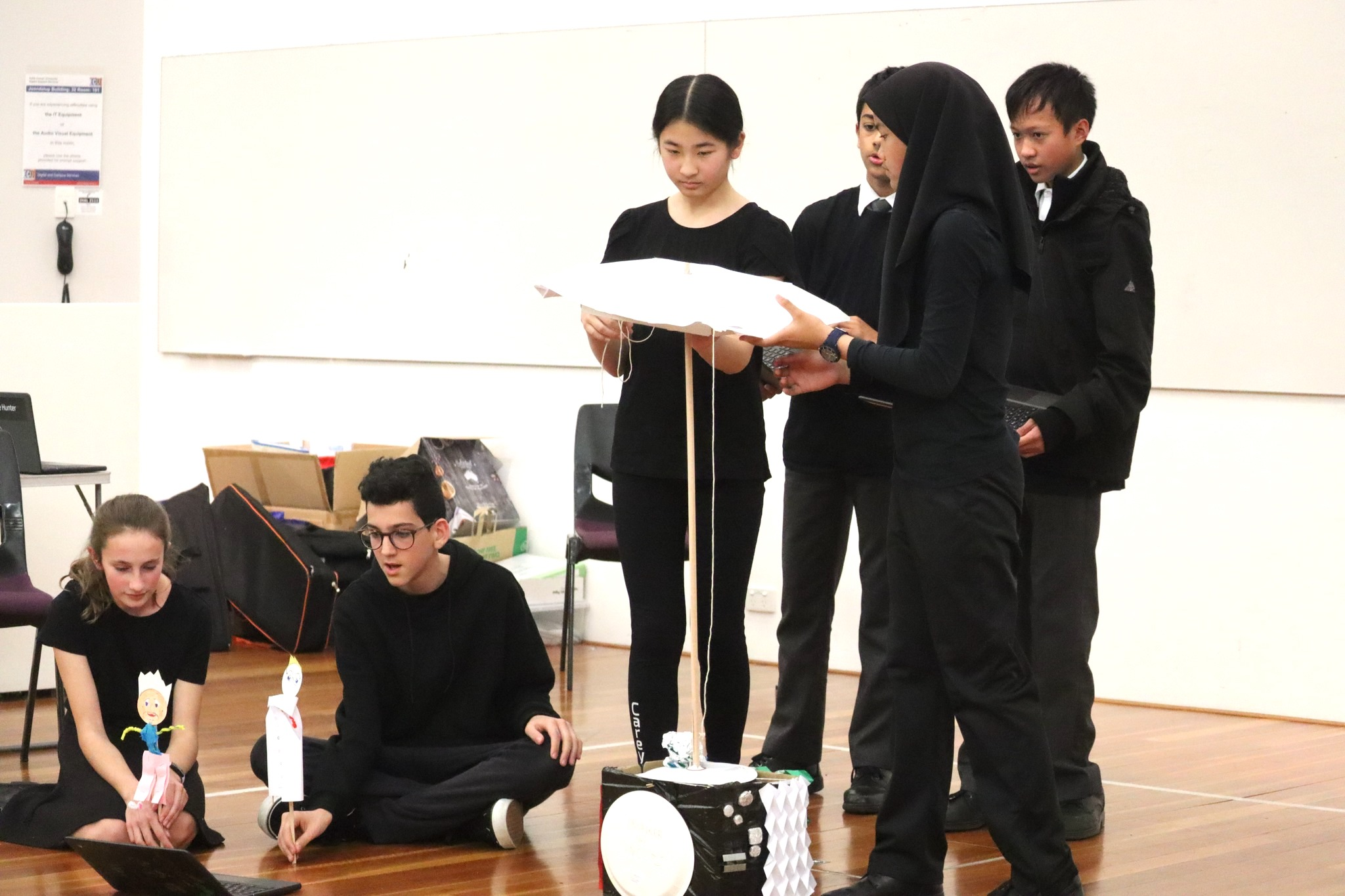
A STEM team presenting at the Perth Tournament of Minds Branch Final in 2022

The top-scoring team from the Primary and Secondary divisions of each Discipline is invited to participate in the TOM International Final (TIF), which follows the same competition format as the Branch Final. The event rotates through the Australian capital cities.

=== Venues ===
Year	Place	Notes	Ref
2013	Australian National University, Canberra		
2014	La Trobe University, Melbourne		
2015	University of New South Wales, Sydney		
2016	Griffith University, Gold Coast		
2017	Flinders University, Adelaide		
2018	Charles Darwin University, Darwin		
2019	University of Tasmania, Hobart		
2020	Held online	Due to COVID-19 pandemic	
2021	Online TIF held and coordinated from Edith Cowan University, Perth	Due to COVID-19 pandemic Edith Cowan University was expected to host the event	
2022	Australian National University, Canberra		
2023	La Trobe University, Melbourne		
