= John Carter (endocrinologist) =

Australian medical academic and endocrinologist

John Norman Carter AO (born 28 December 1944) is an Australian medical academic and endocrinologist.

== Early life ==
Carter was born in Melbourne, Australia, and attended Newington College (1957–1961) before graduating in medicine from the University of Sydney.

== Medical career ==
- Clinical Fellow Garvan Institute 1973–1975
- Postgraduate Fellow University of Manitoba 1975–1977
- Consultant Endocrinologist since 1977
- Clinical Associate Professor Department of Medicine, University of Sydney 1998–2010

Clinical Professor Department of Medicine, University of Sydney since 2010

== Committees ==
- President, Australian Diabetes Society 1992–1994

== Fellowships and Honours ==
- Fellow, Royal Australasian College of Physicians
- Officer, Order of Australia (2000)
