= Ken Hillman =

Australian doctor and researcher

Ken Hillman AO is an Australian doctor and researcher. He is an intensive care specialist with research interests including health system reforms and end of life care. He has been Professor of Intensive Care at the University of New South Wales since 1990.

== Academic career ==
From 1973 to 1975, Hillman undertook postgraduate training at St Vincent's Hospital. He continued his post graduate training in Anaesthetics and Intensive Care at St Bartholomew's Hospital in London from 1976 to 1981. Appointed Director of Intensive Care at Charing Cross Hospital in London in 1981, he subsequently returned to Australia in 1983 and after a brief period at the Sir Charles Gairdner Hospital in Perth moved to Sydney as the Director of Intensive Care at Liverpool Hospital in 1985.

Hillman is considered a pioneer in the field of developing and evaluating emergency responses to deteriorating patients in acute hospitals. Hillman was appointed as the first Professor of Intensive Care in the University of New South Wales in 1990 and remains as a practising clinician at Liverpool Hospital and Campbelltown Hospital in Sydney.

Hillman has more than 180 peer reviewed publications, over 24,000 citations, and over A$25 million in peer reviewed grants. He has written textbooks on intensive care and contributed over 50 chapters to other texts. He has more recently engaged in the area of improving the management of the dying process.

Hillman is an advocate for “dying well” and having end-of-life options, such as a plan for dying or living will.

== Honours ==
Hillman was awarded as an Officer of the Order of Australia in 2015 for services to intensive care medicine.

== Selected bibliography ==
=== Journal articles ===
- Hillman KM, Riordan T, O’Farrell SM, Tabaqchali S. Colonization of the gastric contents in critically ill patients. Crit Care Med 1982;10(7):444-7.
- Hillman K. Fluid resuscitation in diabetic emergencies – a reappraisal. Intensive Care Med 1987;13:4-8.
- Sugrue M, Buist MD, Hourihan F, Deane S, Bauman A, Hillman K. Prospective study of intra-abdominal hypertension and renal function after laparotomy. Brit J Surg 1995;82(2):235-8.
- Lee A, Bishop G, Hillman KM. Daffurn K. The medical emergency team. Anaesth Intensive Care 1995;23(2):183-6.
- Kerridge R, Lee A, Latchford E, Beehan SJ, Hillman KM. The perioperative system: A new approach to managing elective surgery. Anaesth Intensive Care 1995;23(5):591-6.
- Hillman K. The changing role of acute care hospitals. Med J Aust 1999;170(7):325-8.
- Hillman K, Parr M, Flabouris A, Bishop G, Stewart A. Redefining in-hospital resuscitation: The concept of the medical emergency team. Resuscitation 2001;48(2):105-10.
- Hillman KM, Bristow PJ, Chey T, Daffurn K, Jacques T, Norman SL, Bishop GF, Simmons G. Antecedents to hospital deaths. Internal Med J 2001;31(6):343-8.
- Hillman K, Chen J, Cretikos M, Bellomo R, Brown D, Doig G, Finfer S, Flabouris A; MERIT Study Investigators. Introduction of the medical emergency team (MET) system: A cluster-randomised controlled trial. Lancet 2005;365(9477):2091-7.
- Malbrain ML, Cheatham ML, Kirkpatrick A, Sugrue M, Parr M, De Waele J, Balogh Z, Leppäniemi A, Olvera C, Ivatury R, D’Amours S, Wendon J, Hillman K, Johansson K, Kolkman K, Wilmer A. Results from the international conference of experts on intra-abdominal hypertension and abdominal compartment syndrome. I. Definitions. Intensive Care Med 2006;32(11):1722-32.
- Soreide E, Morrison L, Hillman K, Monsieurs K, Sunde K, Zideman D, Eisenberg M, Sterz F, Nadkarni VM, Soar J, Nolan JP on behalf of the Utstein Formula for Survival Collaborators. The formula for survival in resuscitation. Resuscitation 2013;84(11):1487-1493. [published on-line 03.08.13]. Doi:10.1016/j.resuscitation.2013.07.02.
- Chen J, Ou L, Hillman KM, Flabouris A, Bellomo R, Hollis SJ, Asareh H. Cardiopulmonary arrest and mortality trends and their association with rapid response system expansion. Med J Aust 2014; 201:167-170. Hillman KM, Chen J, Jones D. Rapid response systems. Med J Aust 2014;201(9):519-521.
- Cardona-Morrell, M, Hillman K. Development of a tool for defining and identifying the dying patients in hospital: Criteria for Screening and Triaging to Appropriate aLternative care (CriSTAL). BMJ Support Palliat Care 2015;5:78-90.
- Cardona-Morrell M, Kim JCH, Turner RM, Anstey M, Mitchell IA, Hillman K. Non-beneficial treatments at the end of life: a systematic review on extent of the problem. Int J Qual Health Care. 2016;1-14.

=== Books ===
- Hillman K, Bishop G. Clinical intensive care. New York: Cambridge University Press; 1996. ISBN 0-521-47812-X.
- Hillman K. Vital Signs. Stories from Intensive Care. Sydney: UNSW Press; 2009. ISBN 978-1742-23095-5.
- DeVita M, Hillman K, Bellomo R, editors. Medical Emergency Teams. Implementation and Outcome Measurement. New York: Springer; 2006.
- Hillman K A Good Life to the End. Allen & Unwin; 2017. ISBN 978-1-76029-481-6
