= Tahir Bilgiç =

Australian comedian, film and television actor

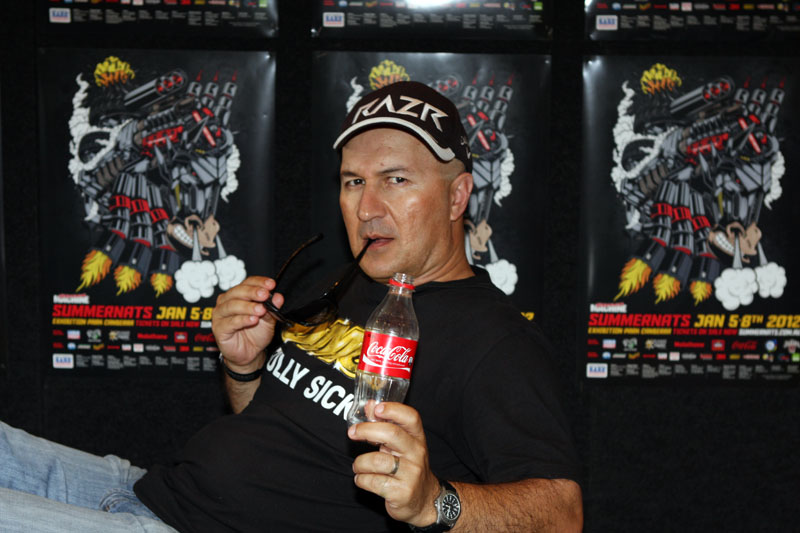
- Bilgiç in 2012
- Notable work: Pizza, Swift and Shift Couriers, Housos, Bogan Hunters and Fat Pizza vs. Housos

Comedy career
- Years active: 1995–present
- Medium: Stand-up, television, film
- Genre: observational humour

Tahir Bilgiç is an Australian comedian and film and television actor. He has written, directed and starred in live shows, including "Lord of The Kebabs", "From Lebanon With Love" and "Straight Outta Compo". He has appeared in Australian TV sitcoms as well as feature films. He initiated and co-created Here Come the Habibs.

== Early life and education ==
Tahir Bilgiç, who is of Turkish descent, grew up around the south-western Sydney suburb of Bankstown.

== Career ==
Bilgic worked as a history and English teacher before going into stand-up comedy. Early gigs included as "a Qantas inflight comedian" and as a stand-up at Club Med in New Caledonia.

He features as the Lebanese character Habib in the hit series Pizza (2000–2007) and the motion pictures Fat Pizza (2003). In 2003, he described himself as "Australia's only Turkish stand-up comedian".

In 2011, he appeared in Swift and Shift Couriers.

In 2018 he co-created and starred in Street Smart.

Bilgiç has appeared on Rove Live, The NRL Footy Show, Laughing Stock, Recovery, Foxtel, Comedy Channel, the SBS documentary series - Aussie Jokers and the Australian improvisational comedy series, Thank God You're Here and as a celebrity judge on Bogan Hunters.

== Recognition and awards ==
Bilgic was voted "Sydney Comedian of the Year" in 1996.

== Filmography ==
- Sydney Comedy Store (1995)
- The NRL Footy Show (1997-2018)
- Pizza TV series (2000–2007)
- Fat Pizza (2003)
- Lord of the Kebabs: The Fellowship of the Hommous (2003)
- Show us your Roots (2004)
- Hollywood Kebabs (2004)
- Thank God You're Here (2006–7)
- Swift and Shift Couriers (2011)
- Housos (2011)
- Bogan Hunters (2014)
- Fat Pizza vs. Housos (2014)
- The Good The Bad The Ethnic (2015)
- Comicus Erectus (2016)
- 2 and a Half Lebs (2017)
- Here Come the Habibs (2016)
- Straight Outta Compo (2019)
- Street Smart (2018)
- I'm a Celebrity...Get Me Out of Here! (2018)
- Crazy Rich Ethnics (2021–22)
