= Mary Coustas =

Australian actress and comedian

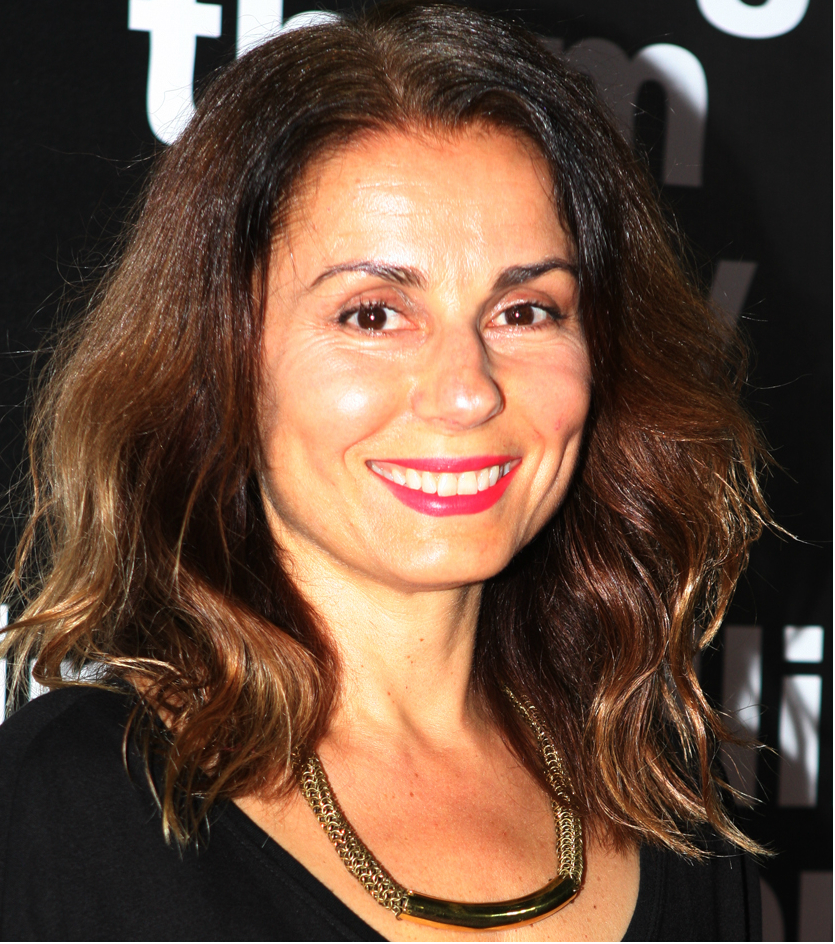
- Coustas at the Killing Them Softly Australian premiere in September 2012
- Born: 16 September 1964 (age 62); Collingwood, Victoria, Australia
- Notable work: Acropolis Now (1989–1992); Greeks on the Roof (2003)
- Spouse: George Betsis (m. 2005)
- Children: 1

Comedy career
- Years active: 1989–present
- Medium: Film and television actress
- Website: https://maryandeffie.com/effie/

Mary Coustas (born 16 September 1964) is an Australian actress, comedian and television personality and writer. Originally from Melbourne, Coustas often performs as the character "Effie", a stereotypical second-generation Greek Australian prone to malapropisms. She completed a Bachelor of Arts at Deakin University in Melbourne, majoring in performing arts and sub-majoring in journalism.

Coustas won the Logie Award for Most Popular Comedy Personality in 1993.

== Theatre ==
Coustas' initial claim to fame came from the comedy stage show Wogs Out of Work alongside Nick Giannopoulos, George Kapiniaris and Simon Palomares.

In 2019, Coustas joined the Shooshi Mango boys and Giannopoulos on stage in a show named Fifty Shades of Ethnic.

2024 sees Mary Coustas return to a stage tour with Effie: Up Yourselfness.

== Television career ==
Coustas appeared on the popular television sitcom Acropolis Now, from 1989 until 1992, in the role of Effie Stephanidis.

Since then she has appeared as Effie in other television shows and commercials. Effie also appeared in the interview show Effie, Just Quietly in 2001 and hosted her own short-lived talk show called Greeks on the Roof in 2003.

Coustas played straight dramatic roles in two police series: Skirts in 1990 and Wildside in 1998. Other roles include Grass Roots, The Secret Life of Us and Good Guys Bad Guys. Her voice-over work includes The Magic Pudding, Hercules Returns and Always Greener. She also appeared as a guest on comedy game show Talkin' 'Bout Your Generation in 2012, and had a guest role in the drama Rake.

In May 2023, it was announced that Coustas would be participating in the twentieth series of Dancing with the Stars. She was paired with Aric Yegudkin.

== Books and music ==
In 1992 Effie released a novelty single: a duet with another fictional character, Garry McDonald's Norman Gunston. The recording was their version of Andrew Lloyd Webber's Amigos Para Siempre. Coustas's book Effie's Guide to Being Up Yourself was published in 2003.

In her 2013 memoir All I Know: A Memoir of Love, Loss and Life, Coustas looked back over her career, and reflected on the lives and deaths of her father, grandmother and daughter.

She co-starred in two comedic, mock music video entries for Eurovision, "Electronik Supersonik" (2004) and "I Am the Anti-Pope" (2006) starring Australian comedian Santo Cilauro as a pop star character named Zladko “ZLAD!” Vladcik from the fictional eastern European country of Molvanîa. Cilauro, along with Rob Sitch and Tom Gleisner, created the “ZLAD!” character to accompany their book, the parody Jetlag Travel Guide to Molvanîa. Cilauro, Sitch and Gleisner would later co-author of similar parody travel guides for Phaic Tăn (in south-east Asia) and San Sombrèro (in Latin America).

== Filmography ==
=== Film ===
Year	Title	Role	Type
1988	Mull aka 'Mullaway'	Helen	Feature film
1989	Blowing Hot and Cold	Jenny	Feature film
1990	Nirvana Street Murder	Helen	Feature film
1993	Hercules Returns	Lisa	Feature film
2000	The Magic Pudding	Ginger (voice)	Animated feature film

=== Television ===
Year	Title	Role	Type
1989-1992	Acropolis Now	Efthimia Francesca 'Effie' Stephanidis	TV series, 40 episodes
1990	Skirts	Constable Julie Makris	TV series, 40 episodes
1998	Wildside	Louise Arden	TV series, 10 episodes
1998	Good Guys Bad Guys	Madonna Kapello	TV series, 1 episode
2000	Water Rats	Hilary Kernaghan	TV series, 1 episode
2001	Effie, Just Quietly	Host (as Effie)	TV series, 6 episodes
2002	The Secret Life of Us	Peace Picabo	TV series, 4 episodes
2002	Always Greener	Cher the Chicken	TV series, 1 episode
2003	Greeks on the Roof	Host (as Effie)	TV series, 11 episodes
2003	Grass Roots	Ava Strick	TV series, 9 episodes
2012	Rake	Judge Ben	TV series, season 2, episode 5: "R v Turner"
2015	About Tonight	Guest (as Effie)	TV series, 1 episode
2015	Stop Laughing...This Is Serious	Guest	TV series, 5 episodes
2023	Dancing with the Stars	Contestant	TV series, season 20 (paired with Aric Yegudkin)
2025	A Bite to Eat With Alice	Herself	TV series, 1 episode
2025	Strife	Sylvie	TV series, 8 episodes
2025	Sunny Nights	Hazel	TV series, 1 episode

== Theatre ==
Year	Title	Role	Type
1987	Wogs Out of Work		Melbourne International Comedy Festival

== Personal life ==
In 1964, Coustas was born in the Melbourne suburb of Collingwood. Her parents in 1960 married in East Melbourne and both originate from Florina. Her father Sterios is from the village of Nymfaio and her mother Theofani (née Efthimiathis) from Mesokampos.

Coustas married George Betsis in 2005. After six years of in vitro fertilisation, their first child was stillborn at 22 weeks. In August 2013, Coustas and her husband announced in an interview with 60 Minutes that she was 22 weeks pregnant and expecting their second child in early December 2013. Their daughter Jamie was born on 28 November 2013.
