= Tracey Callander =

Australian actress

- Occupation: Actress
- Years active: 1983-
- Notable work: Acropolis Now; Future Schlock; Possession
- Partner: Simon Palomares

Tracey Callander is an Australian actress. She had featured roles in the film Future Schlock and the TV series Acropolis Now and Possession.

On stage she appeared in Shakers (Universal Theatre, 1987), Dizzy Spells (The Last Laugh, 1987), A Fault-Line (Seymour Centre, 1986), Globos Shock (Kinselas, 1986), and Spring Awakening (St Martins Youth Arts Centre, 1983).

In 1997 she made the documentary Was That Really Me? based on her experiences of postnatal depression after the births of her and her husband Simon Palomares's two children.
