= The Still Point (film) =

1986 Australian film

- Directed by: Barbara Boyd-Anderson
- Written by: Rosa Colosimo; Barbara Boyd-Anderson
- Produced by: Rosa Colosimo
- Starring: Nadine Garner; Lynn Semmler; Robin Cuming; Steve Bastoni; Alex Menglet; Ben Mendelsohn
- Cinematography: Kevin Anderson
- Edited by: Zbigniew Friedrich
- Music by: Pierre Pierre
- Distributed by: Rosa Colosimo (self-distributed)
- Release date: 1986
- Running time: 85 mins
- Country: Australia
- Language: English
- Budget: AU$262,000

The Still Point is a 1986 Australian film directed by Barbara Boyd-Anderson. Sarah (Nadine Garner), a 15-year-old girl with a hearing impairment, is trying to emerge from the sheltered world her mother has created for her. In doing this, she puts aside the self-imposed isolation of her deafness, and learns the value of her own identity.

== Plot ==
Hearing-impaired Sarah (Nadine Garner) is an unhappy loner. Her father Bill is on the road for work, and her mother Barbara who was unhappy in her marriage to Bill, is dating Paul. When Sarah inadvertently discovers their relationship, she is angry.

Barbara sends Sarah to stay with her grandfather, Warren. While there, Sarah spots some teenagers, including the handsome David (Steve Bastoni). Warren urges her to befriend the teens, but Sarah resists, revealing that her hearing impairment is a big insecurity.

Barbara visits Sarah, but she is unreceptive, berating her mother for concealing her courtship with Paul.

Sarah is invited to a party on the weekend, but immediately feels out of place. David arrives and asks Sarah to dance, angering his ex-girlfriend Simone. The following day, Sarah joins David and his friends at the beach, but Simone taunts Sarah for hearing impairmenf. Sarah flees and David berates his friends for being unkind. He later visits Sarah to apologise, and the pair kiss.

David then takes Sarah on a date to a sideshow, where they encounter a jealous Simone. David reprimands Simone, but she tries to seduce him, and Sarah misinterprets it as a consensual act. David tries to make amends, but Sarah rejects his apology. She later reconsiders, and decides to forgive him.

Sarah's relationship with her mother comes to a head when Paul arrives, resulting in an explosive fight. Barbara reveals to Sarah that when she was young, she had hoped to marry Bill, only to discover that they had nothing in common. They thought having a baby might fix everything, but it only caused more issues. Sarah asks whether her hearing impairment was the reason for their break up, but Barbara reveals it was because she pushed Bill away, as Sarah was her everything.

== Cast ==
- Nadine Garner as Sarah
- Steve Bastoni as David
- Ben Mendelsohn as Peter
- Greg Fleet as Tony
- Alex Menglet as Paul
- Lynn Semmler as Barbara
- Kristy Grant as Simone
- Jodie Yemm as Bianca
- Sarah Lassez as Jane
- Angioletta Schwarz as Pamela
- Sassy Havyatt as Helen
- Katrina Logan as Chloe
- Johnny Quinn as Bill
- Marcus White as Andrew
- Cindy Lee as Cathy
- Robin Cuming as Warren Smith
- Dianne Parrington as Ballet Teacher
- Rona McLeod as Art Teacher
- Gerry Mertagh as Waiter
- Ricky Scibiliamaas as Paper Boy

== Production ==
Producer Rosa Colosimo had been trying to raise finance for a film Blowing Hot and Cold and had found an investor who was willing to give her $100,000 provided the money was spent by the end of the financial year. This was April and Colosimo had until 30 June she was unlikely to be able to raise funds for Blowing Hot and Cold so she wrote a new script with an old friend of hers, Barbara Boyd-Anderson and raised some more money. The first draft was written in three days, with two more drafts the following week.

The film was shot in Melbourne on 16mm.

== Filming Locations ==
Melbourne and surrounds – the credits thank Malvern, Victoria and Melbourne City Councils and the Shire of Bulla; Cinema Papers locates the sea-side town where the heroine's grand-dad lives as being Mount Martha, Victoria, some 60 kilometres south-east of Melbourne.

== Reception ==
Colosimo distributed the film herself, which performed well in Canberra but poorly in Sydney and Melbourne.

== Awards ==
- Victoria and Tasmania Highly Commended Award (Winner) with the Australian Cinematographers Society (1987)
