= Acropolis Now =

Television series

- Genre: Sitcom
- Created by: Nick Giannopoulos; George Kapiniaris; Simon Palomares
- Directed by: Ted Emery; Pino Amenta; Peter Andrikidis; Kendal Flanadan
- Starring: Nick Giannopoulos; George Kapiniaris; Simon Palomares; Mary Coustas
- Theme music composer: George Kapiniaris
- Opening theme: "It's a Sweet Life"
- Country of origin: Australia
- Original language: English
- No. of seasons: 5
- No. of episodes: 63

Production
- Executive producers: Ian Bradley; Gary Fenton
- Producers: Stanley Walsh; Peter Herbert; Oscar Whitbread
- Running time: 30 minutes
- Production company: Crawford Productions

Original release
- Network: Seven Network
- Release: 9 August 1989 – 4 November 1992

Acropolis Now is an Australian television sitcom set in a fictional Greek cafe, called the "Acropolis Cafe" in Melbourne that ran for 63 episodes broadcast from 9 August 1989 to 4 November 1992 on the Seven Network. It was created by Nick Giannopoulos, George Kapiniaris and Simon Palomares, who also starred in the series. They were already quite well known for their comedy stage show, Wogs out of Work. The title is a nameplay on the film Apocalypse Now. Each episode was 20 minutes in length and filmed in front of a live audience.

== Synopsis ==
Jim's (Giannopoulos) father asks him to run the family business, the Acropolis café, when he suddenly leaves Australia to return to his homeland Greece. The series centres on the activities of the cafe staff. Greek Jim Stefanidis, is the immature owner and his best friend, Spaniard Ricky Martinez (Palomares) is the sensible manager (seasons 1-2 only). Memo (Kapiniaris) is the traditional Greek waiter, Liz is the liberated Australian waitress. Skip is the new cook from the bush, naïve to wog culture but more accomplished in Greek cuisine than Jim, and Manolis is the stubborn, incompetent, drunk cook from the old cafe. The show's humour arises from the clash of cultures and beliefs.

Jim's hairdresser cousin Effie, played by Mary Coustas, became a hugely popular and enduring character during the run of the show. Coustas later reprised the role for several TV specials and series including Effie, Just Quietly, an SBS comedy/interview show, and Greeks on the Roof, a short-lived Greek-Australian version of the British television show The Kumars at No. 42.

== Episodes ==
Series overview
Series	Episodes	Originally released	
Series	Episodes	First released	Last released
1	11	9 August 1989	18 October 1989
2	13	2 August 1990	25 October 1990
3	13	21 February 1991	23 May 1991
4	13	13 February 1992	7 May 1992
5	13	12 August 1992	4 November 1992

=== Season 1 (1989) ===
No.	Title	Directed by	Written by	Original release date
1	"Old Bar... New Bar"	Ted Emery	Nick Giannopoulos, George Kapiniaris & Simon Palomares	9 August 1989
Kostas Stephanidis returns to Greece after 23 years in Australia, leaving his son Jim in charge of the Acropolis Café. Jim immediately decides to modernise the old-fashioned business, but when chef Manolis drinks himself unconscious, Jim hires bush cook Gavin "Skippy" Farrell as his replacement. Liz joins the staff as a waitress, setting the scene for the café's new era.
2	"The Proxy Blues"	Ted Emery	Nick Giannopoulos, George Kapiniaris & Simon Palomares	16 August 1989
Jim's mother announces that Jim is finally going to get married and sends Stella from Greece to meet him. Jim prepares for the arranged marriage before discovering that Stella isn't actually his prospective bride at all. Meanwhile, Manolis continues his feud with Skippy and Memo struggles with his usual customer-service problems.
3	"The Martinez Inquiry"	Ted Emery	Nick Giannopoulos, George Kapiniaris & Simon Palomares	23 August 1989
Ricky takes a hard look at the café's finances and discovers that Jim's generous approach to public relations is costing them money. With free coffees, meals and favours being handed out to practically everyone, Ricky decides that the Acropolis needs to start behaving like a business.
4	"The Trouble with Mothers"	Ted Emery	Nick Giannopoulos, George Kapiniaris & Simon Palomares	30 August 1989
Memo enters the prestigious Waiters' Race, determined finally to defeat his long-time rival, Alexander the Great. Having previously finished third and second, Memo is convinced that this is the year he will take the coveted title.
5	"It's Academic"	Ted Emery	Nick Giannopoulos, George Kapiniaris & Simon Palomares	6 September 1989
Jim tries to persuade Ricky to return to his old dating habits, only to discover that university has changed his friend's priorities. When Ricky's former girlfriend Sarah returns, the pair briefly reconcile and plan to move to Queensland. Liz subsequently discovers that Sarah has other plans, forcing Ricky to reconsider his future.
6	"It's Not Unusual"	Ted Emery	Nick Giannopoulos, George Kapiniaris & Simon Palomares	13 September 1989
Jim books Greek singing sensation Con Jones to perform at the café. Memo, however, has unfinished business with Con, remembering how their own singing partnership ended disastrously years earlier. Memo's jealousy reaches comic proportions before the two performers eventually put their differences aside.
7	"The Key to Her Heart"	Pino Amenta	Nick Giannopoulos, George Kapiniaris & Simon Palomares	20 September 1989
Liz attends a Fabian Society meeting, with Jim tagging along because of his fascination with Fabian. After the pair accidentally lock themselves inside the café, Liz's claustrophobia begins to take over. Their predicament becomes even more complicated when a burglar tries to break in.
8	"Easter Greek Style"	Pino Amenta	Mary Coustas, Nick Giannopoulos, George Kapiniaris & Simon Palomares	23 August 1989
Greek Easter approaches and Memo struggles with the traditional period of fasting and abstinence. Manolis meanwhile becomes obsessed with horse racing, while Jim attempts to help him with his betting. The celebrations culminate in a chaotic Easter feast involving church, candles and the traditional egg-tapping game.
9	"Three Skips and a Joey"	Pino Amenta	Nick Giannopoulos, George Kapiniaris & Simon Palomares	4 October 1989
Liz bets Jim that he cannot successfully pick up a woman in the café. His first attempt ends embarrassingly when he discovers his target is heavily pregnant. The woman turns out to be Margot, an old acquaintance of Skippy's, who announces that she and Skippy are going to marry—despite having not seen each other for five years. When the truth about the baby's father emerges, the café becomes an impromptu delivery room.
10	"Bucklovers"	Pino Amenta	Nick Giannopoulos, George Kapiniaris & Simon Palomares	11 October 1989
Jim is given the job of organising his cousin's buck's night, while Liz arranges a hens' night for the bride, Gina. Effie's choice of stripper causes unexpected trouble when Gina takes an immediate liking to him. The wedding is called off, but Liz works to bring the couple back together.
11	"Writer's Block"	Pino Amenta	Nick Giannopoulos, George Kapiniaris & Simon Palomares	18 October 1989
Liz becomes infatuated with Epsilon, a famous Greek poet who visits the café. Jim recognises him from school and becomes suspicious of his motives. When Memo discovers that Epsilon has been passing off Memo's poetry as his own, Liz finally sees through the celebrated poet's act.

=== Season 2 (1990) ===
No.	Title	Directed by	Written by	Original release date
1	"Cappuccino Catastrophe"	Pino Amenta	Simon Palomares	2 August 1990
Ricky returns from holiday to discover that Jim has wrecked the cappuccino machine, the cash register and the telephone. His stress increases when a woman he met on holiday unexpectedly arrives, only for him to discover that she is the new bank manager and is married to his wrestling hero The Strangulator.
2	"Double or Nothing"	Pino Amenta	Chris Anastassiades & Nick Giannopoulos	9 August 1990
Effie bets Liz that she cannot get Jim to take her out. Liz accepts the challenge and Jim becomes convinced that his romantic luck has finally changed. Meanwhile, Memo attempts to break a record by balancing more than thirty coffee cups and saucers.
3	"Black Ain't Black"	Pino Amenta	Chris Anastassiades & Nick Giannopoulos	16 August 1990
With Liz away, Ula, an Aboriginal Australian woman, takes over her job at the café. Memo misunderstands her background while Jim makes an embarrassing attempt to relate to her. Eventually Jim and Ula become friends, leaving Liz with nothing to worry about.
4	"Olives Ain't Olives"	Pino Amenta	Simon Palomares	23 August 1990
Jim receives a chain letter and dismisses it as nonsense—until his father calls from Greece with news that he needs to sell the café to raise money. Jim hastily reconnects the chain letter and looks for a way to save the business. His plan involves borrowing money from his father's friend, whose unmarried daughter needs a boyfriend.
5	"St. Memo's Fire"	Peter Andrikidis	George Kapiniaris	30 August 1990
After attending a religious festival, Memo decides to become a Greek Orthodox priest. His new vocation requires him to give up sex, alcohol and his temper for forty days and forty nights which causes endless frustration.
6	"Ms Acropolis"	Pino Amenta	Chris Anastassiades & Nick Giannopoulos	6 September 1990
Jim organises a beauty contest to attract customers to the café. Liz objects to the idea, believing such contests objectify women, while Effie eagerly enters the competition. Jim soon discovers that promising the winner a celebrity date was a mistake when Effie and the other contestants turn against him.
7	"Carmen I'm Too Bizet"	Pino Amenta	Simon Palomares	13 September 1990
Ricky agrees to babysit his friend's daughter Carmen while Jim and Memo attend a football match. When the child's mother fails to return as expected, Ricky is left scrambling to cope. The situation becomes even more complicated when the mother's new boyfriend discovers that she has a baby.
8	"Ring of Confidence"	Pino Amenta	Chris Anastassiades & Nick Giannopoulos	20 September 1990
Jim decides to sell his grandmother's ring to pay for a new muffler for his beloved Monaro. When he gives the ring to Liz and tells her he has an important question to ask, she assumes he is proposing marriage. Jim must desperately try to clear up the misunderstanding without destroying their friendship.
9	"Jobs for the Girls"	Pino Amenta	George Kapiniaris	27 September 1990
Effie and Sophie demand jobs at the café, but Ricky insists there is no room in the budget for extra staff. Jim challenges Effie to find work elsewhere, confident she will fail.
10	"Shakespeare Was a Greek"	Pino Amenta	George Kapiniaris	4 October 1990
After seeing Shakespeare performed, Jim decides the café should stage its own version of Romeo and Juliet. The resulting production bears little resemblance to Shakespeare, but Jim attempts to guarantee its success by bribing a theatre critic to give it a favourable review.
11	"My Sister Aphroula"	Pino Amenta	George Kapiniaris	11 October 1990
Memo becomes determined to find a husband for his sister Aphroula. A case of mistaken identity sends Harry, the bouncer from Vibrations disco, off with the wrong woman, leaving Jim to escort Aphroula himself. After Liz gives Aphroula a makeover, the previously overlooked woman suddenly attracts plenty of attention.
12	"The Taxman Cometh"	Pino Amenta	Simon Palomares	18 October 1990
The Tax Office announces an audit of the Acropolis Café. Ricky desperately checks the books while Jim worries about the consequences of missing records. When the accounts disappear, Ricky races to find them before the tax inspector can cause serious trouble.
13	"Ricky Sings the Blues"	Pino Amenta	Chris Anastassiades & Nick Giannopoulos	25 October 1990
Ricky is offered the chance to leave the café and tour Europe with a jazz band. Although he initially refuses because he believes the others need him, Jim, Memo and the rest demonstrate that they can survive without him. Ricky ultimately decides to follow his musical ambitions and leaves the Acropolis. Note: The last appearance of Simon Palomares as Ricky.

=== Season 3 (1991) ===
No.	Title	Directed by	Written by	Original release date
1	"Harry Who Didn't"	Pino Amenta	Chris Anastassiades & Nick Giannopoulos	21 February 1991
Jim's friendship with Harry is threatened when Harry's new girlfriend develops an attraction to Jim. Desperate to discourage her, Jim sets out to find a woman who can make him appear unavailable and unattractive.
2	"The Goddess"	Pino Amenta	George Kapiniaris	28 February 1991
Memo falls hopelessly in love with his hairdresser but lacks the courage to tell her. He turns to Jim for romantic advice, with predictable consequences as Jim attempts to coach his lovesick friend.
3	"A Fistful of Cabana"	Pino Amenta	Pino Amenta, Chris Anastassiades & Peter Herbert	7 March 1991
Jim discovers that his father has lost the café in a card game. The new Italian owner installs his nephew in charge, forcing Jim and the staff to fight for control of the business they thought was theirs.
4	"On the Waiterfront"	Kendal Flanagan	Chris Anastassiades & Nick Giannopoulos	14 March 1991
A dispute involving Effie escalates into industrial action at the café. Memo finds himself caught between his loyalty to the Greek Waiters Association and his loyalty to Jim and the Acropolis.
5	"Teenage Mutant Ninja Greeks"	Kendal Flanagan	Chris Anastassiades & Nick Giannopoulos	21 March 1991
Memo becomes increasingly desperate to find a husband for his sister. He arranges a blind date with a soccer player, hoping the athletic young man will finally be the answer to his matchmaking problems.
6	"The Kid"	Kendal Flanagan	Chris Anastassiades & Nick Giannopoulos	28 March 1991
Jim's young cousin is skipping school, prompting Jim to consider what sort of example he is setting. When the boy's teacher turns out to be an old flame of Memo's, Jim asks Liz to help him become a model citizen. In the end, honesty proves more useful than Jim's attempts at self-improvement.
7	"The Best of Enemies"	Kendal Flanagan	Chris Anastassiades & Nick Giannopoulos	4 April 1991
Jim's old rival Vinnie opens a competing bistro and attempts to lure Liz away from the Acropolis. Jim responds by challenging Vinnie to an arm-wrestling contest, with Liz bizarrely becoming part of the stakes.
8	"Throw Memo from the Plane"	Kendal Flanagan	Julian Glavacich, George Kapiniaris & Alan Keaughran	11 April 1991
Memo's mother sends a relative from Greece to pressure him into marriage. Desperate to convince the man that he has settled down, Memo persuades Effie to pretend to be his fiancée.
9	"Snow Job: Part One"	Kendal Flanagan	Chris Anastassiades & Nick Giannopoulos	18 April 1991
Jim heads to the snow with Memo and Alfredo for a much-anticipated holiday. He arranges a temporary replacement at the café, while Don Santo declares his love for Liz. Unfortunately, the holiday begins to look very different from the glamorous getaway Jim had imagined.
10	"Snow Job: Part Two"	Kendal Flanagan	Chris Anastassiades & Nick Giannopoulos	25 April 1991
The boys discover that their snowy accommodation is far less luxurious than promised. As rumours spread about an escaped lunatic in the area, their suspicions and paranoia grow until virtually everyone becomes a potential suspect.
11	"Midnight Expresso"	Kendal Flanagan	Simon Palomares	2 May 1991
A nearby factory is accused of polluting the environment. Liz organises a protest against it, but the demonstration lands Jim in jail, leaving the café staff to deal with the consequences.
12	"Back in the U.S.S.R"	Kendal Flanagan	Marc Gracie, Peter Herbert & Simon Palomares	16 May 1991
An exchange student from Ukraine arrives at the café, and Jim becomes convinced that he is secretly a KGB agent. Determined to expose the supposed spy, Jim has Effie dress up as "Charlene", whom he regards as the stereotypical Australian woman, as part of his counter-espionage operation.
13	"Acropolis Law"	Kendal Flanagan	Chris Anastassiades & Mary Coustas	23 May 1991
Effie and Sophie experiment with a new hair product in their continuing quest for perfect hair. When the experiment goes horribly wrong, Effie decides that the only solution is legal action against Sophie.

=== Season 4 (1992) ===
No.	Title	Directed by	Written by	Original release date
1	"Oh Suzanna!"	Peter Andrikidis	Elizabeth Coleman	13 February 1992
Jim's habit of employing attractive women lands him in serious trouble when he causes his former flame Suzanna to lose her marketing job. Despite knowing that the café staff will be furious, Jim offers Suzanna a job as a waitress.
2	"Crimes of Fashion"	Mark Piper	Ray Boseley	20 February 1992
Effie and Sophie stage a hair and fashion show at the café, only to have Suzanna steal the limelight. Furious, Effie contemplates poisoning her rival with hair-care products, while Jim and Memo attempt to sabotage Suzanna's efforts to find another job.
3	"Phantom of the Acropolis"	Mark Piper	Julian Glavacich, George Kapiniaris & Alan Keaughran	27 February 1992
Vinnie reaches an agreement to buy the Acropolis from Jim's father, but Jim still has the final say. Meanwhile, Memo becomes convinced that the café is haunted by his supposedly terrifying cousin Spiro Kruegernidis.
4	"21 Today"	Julie Bates & Aleksi Vellis	Mary Coustas	5 March 1992
Effie is determined to make Sophie's twenty-first birthday unforgettable. The only problem is getting into Vibrations, where the bouncer stands between the women and their planned night of celebration.
5	"The Letter"	Julie Bates & Aleksi Vellis	Kevin Nemeth	12 March 1992
The men become convinced that Suzanna is secretly responsible for a magazine letter from a woman seeking advice about three male co-workers. Meanwhile, Effie seeks advice of her own while trying to choose a new car.
6	"Wheel of Shame"	Elizabeth Crosby	George Kapiniaris	19 March 1992
Memo needs money to help his sister return to Greece, so he appears on the television quiz show Wheel of Language. At the café, Suzanna orders Jim to dispose of his enormous magazine collection. During the clear-out, Jim notices that one of the photographs appears to feature Suzanna.
7	"Full Metal Jerks"	Julie Bates	Nick Giannopoulos & Aleksi Vellis	26 March 1992
Memo is drafted into the Greek army, prompting Jim to put him through an intensive training program. Suzanna, meanwhile, decides to take revenge on the company that fired her by crashing its annual party.
8	"Four Eyes"	Kendal Flanagan	Nick Giannopoulos & Aleksi Vellis	2 April 1992
Jim discovers that he must wear glasses or give up driving his Monaro. Embarrassed by the change, he becomes the target of jokes from the others. Suzanna decides to transform the bespectacled Jim from an unfashionable "dag" into a supposedly sophisticated "SNAG" (Sensitive New Aged Guy).
9	"Devil in Disguise"	Kendal Flanagan	Chris Anastassiades & Elizabeth Coleman	9 April 1992
Suzanna's unpleasant former colleague suffers car trouble outside the café and sees an opportunity to manipulate Suzanna into helping her regain her old job. Suzanna responds by pretending to be engaged to Alfredo.
10	"The King and I"	Kendal Flanagan	John Ruane	16 April 1992
Memo discovers what he believes to be Elvis Presley's reincarnated frozen head in the café freezer. A health inspector's unexpected visit makes the situation even more chaotic when the two of them start dreaming about a trip to Graceland.
11	"Desperately Seeking Effie"	Kendal Flanagan	Mary Coustas	23 April 1992
Effie is accidentally injured by one of Memo's practical jokes and wakes up in hospital with amnesia. Jim sees an opportunity to create a new, more agreeable version of Effie, but quickly discovers that changing her personality may not be as easy as he imagined.
12	"Deaf Jammed"	Kendal Flanagan	Chris Anastassiades	30 April 1992
Jim pretends to have lost his hearing so that his friends will treat him more generously. When they discover the deception, Memo, Alfredo and Suzanna devise an elaborate revenge scheme designed to convince Jim that they intend to kill him.
13	"The Last Temptation"	Kendal Flanagan	Chris Anastassiades & Nick Giannopoulos	7 May 1992
After a near-death experience, Alfredo becomes determined to embrace his faith. At the same time, Jim and Suzanna continue to deny their growing attraction to each other, attempting to redirect their romantic and sexual energy elsewhere.

=== Season 5 (1992) ===
No.	Title	Directed by	Written by	Original release date
1	"Dream Baby"	Mike Smith	Ray Boseley	12 August 1992
Jim has a nightmare in which he is married to Suzanna, has two children and has traded his beloved Monaro for a station wagon. Meanwhile, Suzanna encourages the newly unemployed Effie to open a hair salon above the café, while Memo faces legal trouble when his volatile ex-girlfriend Despina returns.
2	"Love"	Mike Smith	Kevin Nemeth	19 August 1992
Jim panics when Suzanna's parents announce that they want to meet their daughter's future husband. They immediately form a negative opinion of Jim and attempt to demonstrate that he and Suzanna are completely incompatible. Effie develops a powerful new shampoo while Memo hires a lawyer to fight Despina's lawsuit.
3	"Hair Razors"	Mike Smith	Chris Anastassiades, Peter Herbert & Aleksi Vellis	26 August 1992
Effie's new salon begins attracting attention when Swedish car expert and photographer Lars Larson becomes romantically interested in her. At the same time, Lars helps Jim rebuild his beloved Monaro. Memo receives provocative photographs from Despina, adding another complication to his turbulent love life.
4	"The Other Man"	Mike Smith	Chris Anastassiades	2 September 1992
Memo becomes increasingly jealous of Despina's attention to sports stars and decides to prove that he is still the man in her life. Suzanna asks Jim to dispose of his famous little black book, while Despina deliberately dates other men to provoke Memo.
5	"The Lars Supper"	Mike Smith	Ray Boseley & Lachy Hulme	9 September 1992
Jim and Memo are obsessed with watching WrestleMania and refuse to let anything interfere with the television broadcast. Meanwhile, Lars gives Effie an ultimatum: admit that she loves him or he will leave Australia. Suzanna and Despina attempt to keep Lars around by organising a farewell party.
6	"Mum's the Word"	Andrew Friedman	Ray Boseley	16 September 1992
Jim tries to keep his relationship with Suzanna secret when his mother unexpectedly returns from Greece. Suzanna becomes frustrated by the secrecy and threatens to leave, while Effie desperately tries to solve a practical problem at Hair Razors involving her customers' access to the salon.
7	"Coward's End"	Andrew Friedman	Christine Madafferi	23 September 1992
Jim appears to have found another woman—and perhaps even a future wife. When Suzanna sees him propose to someone else, she decides to leave Australia and accept a once-in-a-lifetime job managing a resort in Cairo. Memo, meanwhile, nearly forgets Despina's birthday.
8	"The Battle of the Sexists"	Andrew Friedman	Julian Glavacich & George Kapiniaris	30 September 1992
Memo refuses to accompany Despina to Greece, causing his reputation as a legendary Greek womaniser to suffer. His romantic humiliation deepens when Despina rejects his marriage proposal.
9	"Torn Between Two Lovers"	Andrew Friedman	Elizabeth Coleman & Peter Herbert	7 October 1992
Jim's carefully controlled romantic life collapses when both Suzanna and Julia accept his marriage proposals. Suddenly faced with two prospective weddings, Jim panics. Memo, meanwhile, persuades Despina to accompany him to the Greek Waiters Picnic.
10	"Stupidstition"	Andrew Friedman	Julian Glavacich & George Kapiniaris	14 October 1992
A fortune teller warns Memo that Despina is facing a terrible tragedy, prompting him to demand that she quit her job. Jim has an entirely different problem: he must find a best man for his two upcoming weddings.
11	"Confessions of a Hair Gel Goddess"	Andrew Friedman	Mary Coustas	21 October 1992
Effie works desperately to prevent Julia and Suzanna from discovering one another while Jim tries to keep his romantic double life intact. She finally admits her love for Lars, while Memo receives his first fax from Despina and Lars reveals a surprising secret about his past.
12	"Here Come the Brides: Part One"	Andrew Friedman	Nick Giannopoulos	28 October 1992
Jim attempts to organise two weddings while hiding the truth from both prospective brides. Eventually he admits to Memo that he does not actually love either Suzanna or Julia. Memo responds by throwing a disastrous buck's party as the wedding plans descend into chaos.
13	"Here Come the Brides: Part Two"	Andrew Friedman	Nick Giannopoulos	4 November 1992
Jim fails to appear at either of his planned weddings. Lars returns to Effie's life, while Despina finally declares her love for Memo. With the weddings abandoned and the café's romantic entanglements finally exposed, the Acropolis crew's story comes to an end.

== Popular culture ==
Acropolis Now helped popularise the term "skippy" or "skip" to refer to Anglo-Celtic Australians and others of European but non-Mediterranean descent. This term (inspired by the iconic 60's TV series Skippy the Bush Kangaroo) became popular with Mediterranean-Australians, and to a lesser extent non-Mediterranean people, especially in Melbourne.

== Production ==
The program was produced by Crawford Productions which is now owned by WIN Television.

== Characters ==
=== Overview ===
Character	Portrayed by	Acropolis Now				
Character	Portrayed by	1	2	3	4	5
Drimitrius "Jim" Stefanidis	Nick Giannopoulos	Main	Main	Main	Main	Main
Agamemnon "Memo" Aristotele Hatzidimitropoulos	George Kapiniaris	Main	Main	Main	Main	Main
Efthimia Francesca "Effie" Stefanidis	Mary Coustas	Recurring	Recurring	Recurring	Main	Main
Ricardo "Ricky" Martinez	Simon Palomares	Main	Main			
Elizabeth "Liz" Maloney	Tracey Callander	Recurring	Recurring	Recurring		
Gavin "Skip" Farrell	Simon Thorpe	Recurring	Recurring	Recurring		
Manolis	George Vidalis	Recurring				
Sophie	Sheryl Munks	Recurring	Guest	Guest	Recurring	
Aphrodite (Aphroula) "Afro" Costadina Afiyenya Hatzidimotropoulos	Evdokia Katahanas		Guest	Guest		
Harry (the bouncer)	Kris Karahisarlis		Guest	Guest		
Alfredo	Nick Carrafa			Recurring	Main	
Suzanna Martin	Nicki Wendt				Main	Main
Despina Hatzipapadopoulos	Georgie Parker					Main
Lars Larson	Simon Wilton					Main
Julia	Katerina Kotsonis					Recurring
Olga	Christine Kaman					Recurring

=== Other characters ===
- Russell Crowe as Danny O'Brien (Soccer Star)
- Anthony Brandon Wong as Guido Mazzio (Italian-Asian; Guido Rosi's cousin)
- Warren Mitchell as Kostas 'Con' Stefanidis (Jim's Father)
- Zlatko Kasumovic as Vlad (Harry's Brother; the bouncer)
- Lawrence Mah as Colin (Chinese Green Grocer)
- Tony Poli (S03E07) & Joe Perrone (S04E02) as Vinnie Vincenzo (Owner of Vinnie's Bistro, Jim's long-time rival)
- Gerry Connolly as Larry (Wheel of Language Host)
- Vince D'Amico as Don Santo (The Italian Godfather)
- Di Adams as Michael 'Mike' (Female Masculine Chef)
- Fotis Pelekis as Dimi Stefanidis (The Kid; Jim's Identical teenage year 10 wagging school cousin)
- Jeremy Stanford as Andy Farrell
- Gina Riley as Demi Cashimedes
- Diane Craig as Joan Wilson
- Mike Bishop as Kevin
- Nikki Coghill as Rebecca
- Rebecca Gibney as Bank manager / Mrs. Spiro Strangulator

== Awards ==
The show itself did not win any awards, but Mary Coustas won the 1993 Logie for Most Popular Comedy Performer for her role as Effie.

== Home media-DVD release ==
Acropolis Now has been released as a complete series boxset by Crawfords Online Store. The boxset contains all 63 episodes on a 15 disc set, along with episode synopses and out-takes from episodes as a special feature.

== Filming location ==
Although the Acropolis cafè/hotel was filmed in HSV-7 Studios, the exterior is still standing and looks almost identical to the show. It is located on 251 Brunswick Street, and corner of Greeves Street, Fitzroy, Melbourne, Australia.

== See also ==
- List of Australian television series
