= Jodie Yemm =

Australian actress (born 1967)

- Born: 1967 (age 58–59); Melbourne, Australia
- Years active: 1969–1986
- Parent(s): Norman Yemm, Amanda Yemm

Jodie Yemm (born 1967) is an Australian actress, best known for her roles in television soap operas.

== Career ==
Yemm had an early role in the 1983 ABC children's anthology series Home. She then appeared in several soap operas, including playing Jennifer Healy in Sons and Daughters, Rosemary Kaye in Prisoner, and teenage tearaway Kelly Morgan, (who lived with Des and Daphne) in Neighbours. She also appeared in The Sullivans as Maisey, and had a guest role in The Flying Doctors.

She played the antagonist, Bianca, in 1986 film The Still Point, opposite Nadine Garner, Steve Bastoni and Ben Mendelsohn.

== Filmography ==
=== Film ===
Year	Title	Role	Notes
1985	The Still Point	Bianca	Feature film

=== Television ===
Year	Title	Role	Notes
1969	Riptide	Jodie Rix	1 episode
1971	Homicide	Sally Patterson	1 episode
1979	Skyways	Debbie Kennedy	1 episode
1983	Home	Joan	2 episodes
1983	Sons and Daughters	Jennifer Healy	Season 2, 18 episodes
1983	Prisoner	Rosemary Kaye	Season 5, 12 episodes
1986–1987	Neighbours	Kelly Morgan	Season 2, episodes 384–398
1987	Camera Script	Gina	Episode: "Come Summer"
	The Sullivans	Maisey	
	The Flying Doctors		

== Personal life ==
She is the daughter of late actor, singer and sportsman Norman Yemm and his wife Amanda Yemm.
