= George Kapiniaris =

Australian actor and comedian

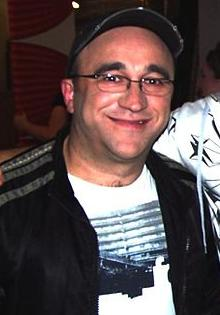
- Born: 27 February 1961 (age 65); Melbourne, Victoria, Australia
- Years active: 1980s–present
- Notable work: Acropolis Now (1989–1992); The Flying Doctors (1988–1994); Underbelly (2008)

George Kapiniaris (Greek: Γιώργος Καπινιάρης, romanized: Giórgos Kapiniáris) (born 27 February 1961) is an Australian stage, television and film actor and comedian. He is of Greek descent and is best known for his role in popular sitcom Acropolis Now and composed the series' theme song.

== Career ==
=== Stage ===
Kapiniaris with Simon Palomares shown at right in 2008

Kapiniaris appeared in the stage show Wogs Out of Work with Nick Giannopoulos, in the 1980s. In 2007, he joined forces with fellow comedians Joe Avati, Nish Selvadurai and Simon Palomares for a national tour Il Dago. In late 2012, he played in the Australian stage version of Chitty Chitty Bang Bang.

=== Television ===
In 1987, Kapiniaris joined the cast of the drama series The Flying Doctors as Demetris "D.J." Goannidis. He stayed on this role until 1991. During this time, he also starred in the Melbourne-based popular sitcom Acropolis Now with Giannopoulos, Simon Palomares and Mary Coustas. Since that show's cancelation, he has continued stand-up comedy and has produced a few stage performances, as well as emceeing events such as weddings. Some of his songs include a parody of Knockin' on Heaven's Door, called "Gnocchi on Heaven's Door".

In 2007, Kapiniaris starred in the television comedy series Kick on SBS as Takis Mavros. He also appeared in the same year on the television soap opera Neighbours, in a guest role as a celebrity chef. Kapiniaris appeared in the controversial 2008 mini series Underbelly, where he played a real life character George Defteros. Also in 2008, Kapiniaris (and his Acropolis Now co-star Simon Palomares) made consecutive appearances on successful Channel 31 show, the Deakin TV produced TheatreGames LIVE.

Kapinaris has also had minor stints in Paul Fenech comedies, such as Pizza as Ronnie McDoggle, Swift and Shift Couriers as a marriage celebrant and the 2011 comedy Housos in a minor role.

Kapiniaris has appeared in a series of comedic commercials for South Australian automotive repairer and insurance broker, the RAA, featuring Kapiniaris talking to a confidante; a barista named 'Trev' at a coffee shop. Kapiniaris created his own website based on the RAA ads. He also created a satirical Today Tonight segment entitled The Dummies, poking fun at politicians through the use of puppets.

=== Film ===
In 2003, he had a role in the film Fat Pizza, playing the character of Ronnie McDoggle. In 2012, he had a minor role in Housos vs Authority, the screen version of the sitcom Housos.

In 2009, he appeared as Ricardo in Broken Hill, an inmate who played guitar in a jail band.

He plays Uncle Tasso in the 2015 film version of hit Australian stage play Alex & Eve, written by Alex Lykos

== Filmography ==
=== Film ===
Year	Title	Role	Type
1989	Closer and Closer Apart	Enzo Vozza	Direct-to-video film
1995	Rainbow's End	Cafe Proprietor	TV movie
1997	Joey	Spiros	Feature film
2003	Fat Pizza	Ronnie McDoggle	Feature film
2004	Thunderstruck	Mr Koyths	Feature film
2005	Bloody Footy	Vito	Short film
2009	Broken Hill	Ricardo Romero	Feature film
2010	Bad Language	Lefteri	Short film
2010	Latté	John the Barista	Short film
2011	Big Mama's Boy	Theo	Feature film
2012	Housos vs. Authority	Stylist	Feature film
2014	Fat Pizza vs. Housos	Ronnie McDoggle	Feature film
2015	Alex & Eve	Uncle Tasso	Feature film
2023	Finally Me	Mr Paoadopoulos	Feature film

=== Television ===
Year	Title	Role	Type
1986	The Fast Lane	Arly	TV series, 1 episode
1987	Willing and Abel		TV series, 1 episode
1987	Theatre Sports	Self (Team: "Lost on Stage")	TV series, 1 episode
1987–91	The Flying Doctors	Demetris 'D.J.' Goannidis	TV series, 110 episodes
1988	Sentiments	Immigration Officer	TV series, 1 episode
1989–92	Acropolis Now	Agamemnon 'Memo' Aristotele Hatzidimitropoulos	TV series, seasons 1–5, 63 episodes
1992	Melbourne International Comedy Festival	Self (stand-up comedian)	TV special, 1 episode
1995, 2000	Blue Heelers	Leo Tapis / Gordon Jennings	TV series, 2 episodes
1999	Pig's Breakfast	Queegle	TV series, 1 episode
2000	Round the Twist	Paulo	TV series, 1 episode
2000	Russell Gilbert Live	Racketeer	TV series, 1 episode
2001–03	Pizza	Ronnie / Nanna	TV series, 4 episodes
2004	Stingers	Serge the K	TV series, 1 episode
2007	Kick	Takis Mavros	TV miniseries, 13 episodes
2007	Neighbours	Tony Aristides	TV series, 1 episode
2008	TheatreGames LIVE		
2008	Swift and Shift Couriers	Marriage celebrant	TV series
2008	Underbelly	George Defteros	TV series, 3 episodes
2009	The Squiz	Self	TV series, 2 episodes
2011	Housos: The Thong Warrior	George	TV series, 1 episode
2011–12	Toon Time	Special guest	TV series
2014	It's a Date	Tony	TV series, 1 episode
2014	Planet Unearth	Self	TV series
2016	Offspring	Nick	TV series, 1 episode
2016–17	Fancy Boy	Joe	TV series, 1 episode
2019	King TV	Self	TV series, 2 episodes
2019–21	Fat Pizza: Back in Business	Ronnie McDoggle	TV series, 9 episodes
2023	Darradong Local Council	Mayor Theo Theopoulos	TV series, 9 episodes

=== Video game ===
Year	Title	Role	Type
2004	Rome: Total War	Voice	Video game

== Stage ==
Year	Title	Role	Type
1980	Obedience / The Future is in Eggs	Director	Victoria College, Melbourne
1981	Oedipus		Victoria College, Melbourne
1982	Hoopla - Opposite Waves		Victoria College, Melbourne
1984	Good Things Come in Glass		Victoria College, Melbourne
1984	Sorry - Audience / Private View		Victoria College, Melbourne
1985	Death: The Cabaret		St Martins Theatre, Melbourne
1986	Worry Beads and Furry Dice	Comedian	Little Sister's Cabaret Room, Adelaide for Adelaide Fringe
1987	Wogs Out of Work	Comedian	Melbourne International Comedy Festival
1989	Wogs Out of Work	Comedian	Enmore Theatre, Sydney, Geelong Arts Centre, Regal Theatre, Perth
1991	Acropolis Now		Thebarton Theatre, Adelaide, Canberra Theatre
1992	Return to the Forbidden Planet	Captain Tempest	Comedy Theatre, Melbourne
1993	An Evening with Merv Hughes		His Majesty's Theatre, Perth
1994–96	The Last Proxy	Comedian	
1996	The New Rocky Horror Show	Eddie / Dr. Scott	Adelaide Festival Centre
1996	The Queen and I	Archie	Comedy Theatre, Melbourne, Monash University, Her Majesty's Theatre, Adelaide, Gold Coast Arts Centre, Newcastle Civic Theatre, Canberra Theatre, University of Sydney
	Roald Dahl’s Little Red Riding Hood		with Geminiani Orchestra
	Una Razza Una Faccia Acropolis Now Live	Comedian	
1997	The New Rocky Horror Show	Riff Raff	Hong Kong Lyric Theatre
1998	Gangster Apparel		Melbourne Athenaeum
	Honeymoon In Hellas	Comedian	
1999	Born Yesterday	Assistant Manager	Playhouse, Melbourne with Melbourne Theatre Company
1999	The Resistible Rise of Arturo Ui	Girl / various characters	Playhouse, Melbourne with Melbourne Theatre Company
	The Bench		The Comedy Club for Melbourne International Comedy Festival
2001	Who Let the Wogs Out?	Comedian	Enmore Theatre Sydney, Leopold Hotel, Perth, Civic Hotel, Perth, IMB Theatre, Thebarton Theatre Adelaide, Canberra Theatre
2001–02	Pizza – Live		Enmore Theatre. Sydney
2002	Oh! What a Night	Stretch Mulligan	State Theatre, Melbourne with Majestic Theatre Company
2003	Flares		Wrest Point Cabaret Room, Tasmania
2004–05	Twelve Angry Men	Juror #2	QPAC Brisbane, Sydney Theatre & Melbourne Athenaeum with Arts Projects Australia
2004–05	Who Let the Wogs Out?		Enmore Theatre Sydney, Leopold Hotel, Perth, Civic Hotel, Perth
2007–08	Il Dago		Victoria & New South Wales tour with XYZ Entertainment
2008	From Burnside With Love		The Cavern Club, Adelaide for Adelaide Fringe Festival
2010	Rockstar	Comedian (solo show)	The John Curtin Hotel, Melbourne for Sydney Comedy Festival & Melbourne International Comedy Festival
2010	The Give and Take	Don Locke	Dunstan Playhouse, Adelaide with STCSA
2012	Chitty Chitty Bang Bang	Goran	Capitol Theatre, Sydney, Her Majesty's Theatre, Melbourne, Festival Theatre, Adelaide, Crown Theatre Perth, Lyric Theatre, Brisbane
2012	Comicus Erectus	Comedian	Melbourne International Comedy Festival & national tour
2015	Zorba the Freak	Comedian (solo show)	Casula Powerhouse, Creative Arts Space, Frankston
2015–16	Wild Wogs	Comedian	Jupiter’s Casino, Gold Coast, South West Italian Club, Bunbury,
2015	Nice Work if You Can Get It	Cookie McGee	State Theatre Arts Centre Melbourne with The Production Company
2017–18	Straight Outta Compo	Comedian	Woodville Town Hall, Arkaba Hotel for Adelaide Fringe, The Star Gold Coast, Astor Theatre, Perth, Bunbury Regional Entertainment Centre, Knox Club for Melbourne International Comedy Festival, Canterbury Hurlstone Park RSL, Ramsgate RSL Club, Burwood RSL, Enmore Theatre for Sydney Comedy Festival
2019	Wild 2 Wogs	Comedian	Bankstown Sports Club
2021	Who Let The Wogs Out	Comedian	
2021	Top End Comedy Spectacular	Comedian	Darwin with Wowza Entertainment / Top End Shows
2022	Crazy Rich Ethnics	Comedian	Australian tour
2023	Life of Byron	Byron	The Fusebox, Sydney for Greek Festival of Sydney & Alex Theatre, Melbourne
2023	Spot the Aussie Comedy Night		
2024	Big Fat Greek - Comedy & Music Variety Show	Comedian – Greek Elvis / various characters	Melbourne, Sydney, Adelaide tour
2024	Woggy Men in Black	Comedian	
