= Joe Avati =

Italian-Australian comedian

Joe Avati (born 1974) is an Italian-Australian comedian who is popular among Italian and descendant of Italians from his native Australia, as well as in Canada, United Kingdom and the United States, where he has performed on several occasions.

== Early life ==
Born in 1974, Avati is the son of a banquet hall owner and was considered a "quiet" child. He grew up in Five Dock, Sydney, Australia. His parents are from Calabria, Italy and some of his shows are performed in the Calabrese dialect, in English with or without a Calabrese accent. Avati studied food science at university in Sydney, graduating second in his year. He entered the restaurant business following university, developing ice cream flavours while working on his stand-up material on the side.

== Comedic style ==
Avati's observational brand of comedy have earned him comparisons to Jerry Seinfeld, and in promotions he is referred to as "the Italian Seinfeld". His observations are drawn from the life around his Italian family, particularly his experiences growing up. The characters and traits that Avati mentions seem to be universal in Italian families, which is why audiences familiar with this cultures are able to identify with him. He is not known for use of profanity, however he has touched on controversial subjects such denying climate change, cancel culture, and "the woke brigade".

== Career ==
Avati began performing as a stand-up comedian in 1995. Avati kicked off his career by releasing a tape entitled "Livin' la Dole-Cheque Vita" in late 1999. He also released Live and Unpluggato in late 2000 which was placed on the internet as a downloadable MP3. This album went on to become the number one selling comedy album in Canada for 18 months. Avati attributes his initial success to Napster after he uploaded one of his routines to the download service.

The stage show – IL DAGO – a "boy band" parody act was produced by Avati and toured to major cities and regional centers around Australia from April 2007 until December 2009. IL Dago starred Avati, George Kapiniaris, Simon Palomares and Nish Selvadurai. The show won the "Most Outstanding Club Performers of the Year" and "Best Comedy Act of 2007" at the 10th Annual Australian Club Entertainment Awards.

Avati began a national Canadian Tour in April 2008 followed by an extended tour of the award-winning IL DAGO show throughout that same year. In 2009, Avati joined presenter Dr. Renee Lim on the Special Broadcasting Service (SBS) TV series Food Investigators. As of 2012, Avati was one of Australia's largest comic exports and the number one selling bilingual comedian in the world. By that year, he had joined a touring comic group called "Comicus Erectus". As of 2018, Avati held the record for fastest-selling comedy show in Canada.

== Discography ==
- Live and Unpluggato (1999)
- Livin' la Dole-Cheque Vita (2000)
- Best of Joe Avati Live
- An Evening in Montreal
- Laughing at Myself

== DVDs ==
- Vivo!
- Live in Canada
- Joe Avati Live
- Back Home and Live (2006)
- The Best of Joe Avati Live 2000–2007
- Comicus Erectus
- il Dago Live at the Metro
- Live in London
- 20th Anniversary Special
- The Greatest Hits
