= Future Schlock =

1984 film

- Directed by: Barry Peak; Chris Kiely
- Written by: Barry Peak; Chris Kiely
- Produced by: Barry Peak; Chris Kiely
- Starring: Mary-Anne Fahey; Mike Bishop
- Cinematography: Malcolm Richards
- Edited by: Ray Pond; Barry Peak
- Production company: Ultimate Show
- Distributed by: Valhalla Films
- Release date: 1984
- Running time: 85 min
- Country: Australia
- Language: English
- Budget: A$40,000 or $80,000

Future Schlock is a 1984 Australian film. It was the first of four movies made by the team of Barry Peak and Chris Kiely who ran the Valhalla Cinemas in Sydney and Melbourne. The movie was known in production as The Ultimate Show. The producers claimed they managed to recoup half the amount of money they spent on the film.

Joh Flaus in the Age wrote "The verbal gags really aren't strong enough for the performances and the scenes are too spotty with the result that the strain shows. The secret of successful ribaldry is relaxation. Future Schlock doesn't have the control of its material to relax — it just sags now and then. An energetic but gratuitously crude parody which lapses too often into parodying itself" Jason Romney in the Melbourne Times says "Future Schlock is certainly entertaining but makes us think as well, as much by foregrounding the techniques which we often take for granted, as by its content" The Sydney Morning Herald's Anna-Maria Dell'oso says "Compared with the expensive US celluloid idiocies of the school holidays, however, the home-made Future Schlock would appear to be a masterpiece. With less sex than Bachelor Party and less violence than Footloose, the Valhalla's Future Schlock is at least vaguely original and certainly ... different." Cinema Papers' Mark Spratt noted "The most disappointing aspect is the film's failure to pinpoint its comic vision which runs a gamut of styles from cheap satire and self-mockery through gross effects and goonish surrealism (Ronnie is mistaken by the Squad first for a budgerigar then for both Cisco and Pancho in disguise). This lack of unity in the material, coupled with performances ranging from spirited in the leads to downright amateur, results in a fairly benign film, against all intentions."

== Cast ==
- Mary-Anne Fahey as Sarah
- Mike Bishop as Bear
- Tiriel Mora as Alvin
- Tracey Callander as Ronnie
- Simon Thorpe as Sammy
- Garry Adams as Bob
- Deborah Force as Trish
- Jason Van de Velde as Simon
- Tracy Harvey as Lois
- Mitchell Faircloth as Dr. Allen
- Peter Cox as Captain Fruitcake
- Keith Walker as Sergeant Tatts
- Peter Moon as Minister
- Paul Harris as TV newsreader
