= Barassi (play) =

Australian play by Tee O'Neill

- Author: Tee O'Neill
- Cover artist: Image by 3 Deep Design. Design by Alan Jager.
- Language: English
- Genre: Play
- Publisher: Currency Press
- Publication date: 2012
- Publication place: Australia
- Media type: Print (Paperback)
- Pages: 96 pp
- ISBN: 978-0-86819-926-9

Barassi (2012) is a play by the Australian playwright Tee O'Neill which tells the story of football legend, Ron Barassi.

Barassi was commissioned and originally produced by Jager Productions in Melbourne, Victoria. It premiered at the Athenaeum Theatre, Melbourne on 26 September 2012 with Steve Bastoni in the title role.

== Critical reception ==
In his review of the play in The Age Cameron Woodhead called it "a slick and cannily directed show sure to please diehard footy fans, and anyone with an interest in the game’s history and character...Barassi does retreat into mawkish sentimentality towards the end, and the material feels slightly overstretched. A straight 90 minutes without interval would have been better. Even so, by commercial theatre standards this is a winner: good writing, committed performances and astute direction do justice to the man and the game."
