= Rosa Colosimo =

Australian film producer

Rosa Colosimo (born 25 June 1949 in Tropea, Italy) is an Australian film producer.

== Career ==
Colosimo was born in Calabria, Italy, and moved to Melbourne, Australia with her family in 1951, where her parents ran a greengrocer's shop. She obtained a Bachelor of Arts from Melbourne University along with a Diploma of Education and began teaching Italian. She owned the only Italian book shop in the Southern hemisphere and became quite successful.

Colosimo became involved in the film industry by distributing Italian films for Australia in the early 80s before turning producer.

She was one of the most prolific film producers in Australia in the late 80s despite a lack of support from the funding bodies - all of her movies were made with private money. She was accused of using Mafia money on by someone on the board of Film Victoria, which Colosimo denied. She pioneered co-production with Italy.

Most of her movies concerned the Italian Australian community in Melbourne. Colosimo:

Producing is constantly stimulating. One of the most satisfying things about it is that while it is demanding, exhausting and tedious, it is ultimately achievable. I really do get excited by the potential of a story or a script. A project constantly shifts for me. I never get bored. It suits me to be in a work environment which is very intense and then to have space for myself in between.

== Select credits ==
- The Martini Family (1979) (short) - producer
- Moving Out (1982) - production consultant
- Waterfront (1983) (mini series) - production consultant
- The Still Point (1986) - producer, writer
- Options (1986) (documentary) - producer, writer
- The Top Half (1986) (short) - writer, director
- Sons of Bitches (1987) (docudrama)
- Hungry Heart (1987) - producer
- Blowing Hot and Cold (1988) - producer, co-writer
- Damned Whores and Evil Bitches (1988) (documentary) - director, producer, writer
- Postcards from Italy (1989) (documentary) - producer, writer
- A Sting in the Tale (1989) - producer
- Closer and Closer Apart (1989) - producer
- Jigsaw (1989) - producer
- A Kink in the Picasso (1990) - executive producer
- Postcards from Italy (1990) (documentary) - producer, writer
- On My Own (1991) - executive producer
- Merchant of Dreams (1994) (documentary) - producer, writer
- The India Connection (1995) (documentary) - producer, writer
- Words Into Action (1995) (documentary) - producer, writer
- OllieRom (1997) (CD-ROM) - consultant
- Ninja Penguins (2000) (internet) - executive producer
- Ineractive Flesh (2000) (internet) - executive producer
- WOW/NOW (2000) (internet) - executive producer

=== Unmade projects ===
- Daniel in the Lions' Den Discovers Among the Aboriginies in Terra Australia Only Sons of Bitches Can Save the World - from a script by Colleen McCullough
- Red Rain (circa 1992) - a "psycho-sexual thriller", an Australian-Italian-Canadian-Japanese co-production to star Jennifer Beals and Russell Crowe from Colosimo's own script
- The Von Kessell Dossier (circa 1992)
