= Wogs Out of Work =

Play written by Nick Giannopoulos

- Original language: English
- Written by: Nick Giannopoulos; Simon Palomares; Mary Portesi
- Genre: comedy
- Setting: Melbourne

Premiere
- Date: 1987

Wogs Out of Work is an Australian play which was written by Nick Giannopoulos, Simon Palomares, and Mary Portesi.

It debuted in 1987 at the Melbourne International Comedy Festival and was enormously successful, touring for a number of years. The original cast included Nick Giannopoulos, Simon Palomares, George Kapiniaris, Steve Bastoni and Mary Coustas. Veteran film and TV director Marc Gracie was the original director of the production.

The success of the show led to a TV series Acropolis Now plus a number of similar comedies, including Wog-A-Rama, Wogboys, Who Let the Wogs Out?, Star Wogs, and Il Dago as well the films The Wog Boy and Wog Boy 2: Kings of Mykonos.
