= Globos =

- Origin: Australia
- Years active: 1981–1984
- Label: Mushroom
- Past members: Mark Trevorrow; Wendy De Waal

Globos was a short-lived musical cabaret project founded by music journalist/comedian Mark Trevorrow and musical partner Wendy De Waal. Globos had two top 30 hits in Australia, both of which were produced by Red Symons.

Trevorrow and De Waal first started performing together in 1980 and soon created a cabaret act called Gloria and the Go-Gos which morphed into The Globos. They performed live comedy shows, mixing live performance and miming and dancing to 60s songs. Shows included All Live All Mime TV Show in 1982, Tonight Tonight at Kinselas in 1983, supported by Jane Markey, Simon Burke, Greta Mendoza, Robert Thompson, Julie Bailue and Alan Wilson, and Globos Shock at Kinselas in 1986, supported by Markey, Tracey Callander, Tim Conigrave and Nell Schofield.

Trevorrow left the project in 1984 to pursue a comedy career as Bob Downe, briefly reuniting with them for a run of shows in 1986.

== Discography ==
=== Singles ===
List of singles, with selected chart positions
Year	Title	Peak chart positions
Year	Title	AUS
1982	"Tintarella di luna"	30
1983	"The Beat Goes On"	28
