= Mark Trevorrow =

Australian comedian

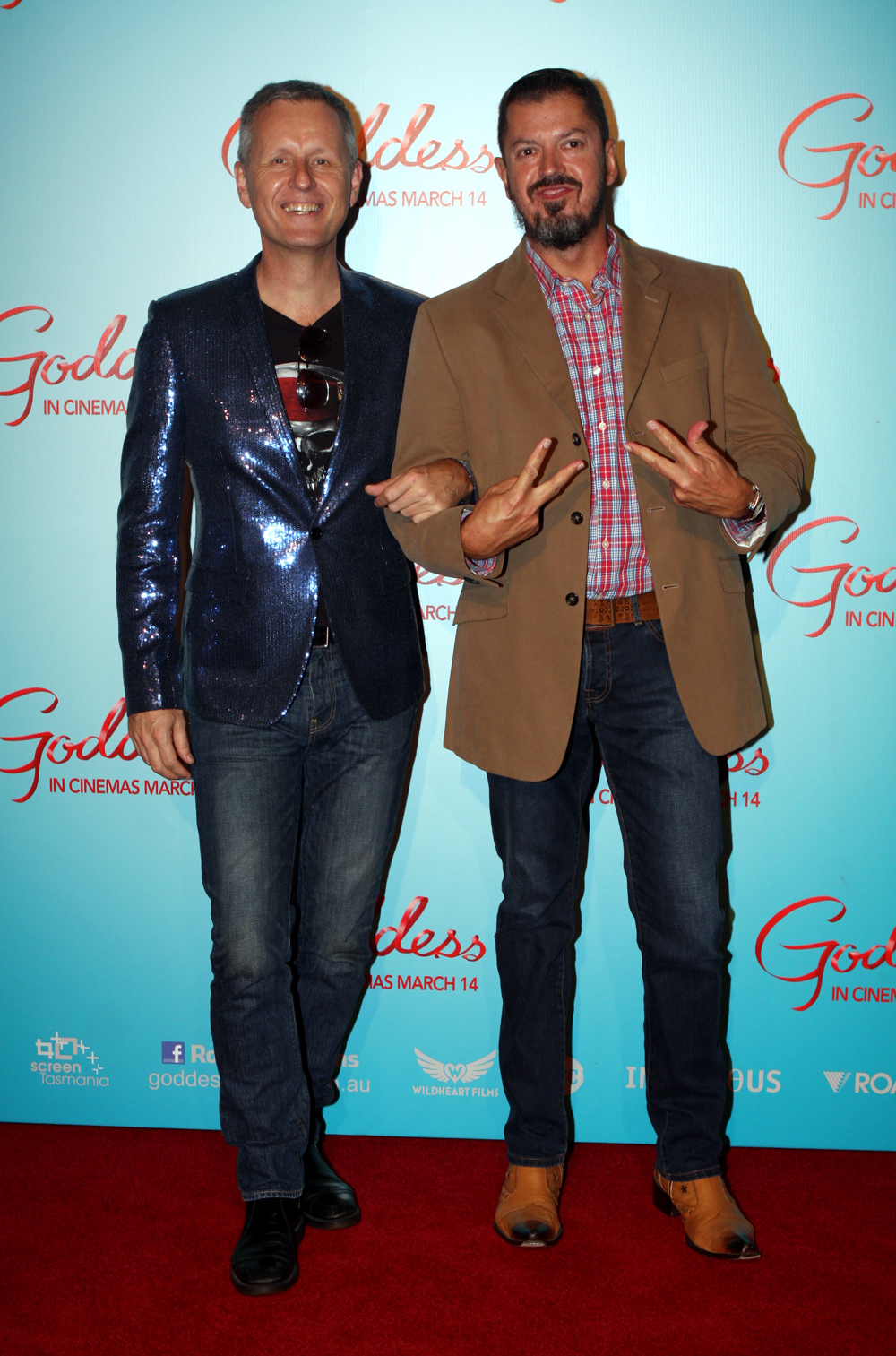
- Trevorrow (pictured left)
- Born: 4 February 1959 (age 67); Melbourne, Victoria, Australia
- Other name: Bob Downe
- Occupations: comedian; TV personality; media personality
- Years active: 1982−present

Mark Trevorrow (born 4 February 1959) is an Australian comedian, television host and media personality. In the early 1980s he had two Top 40 hits as part of Globos with Wendy De Waal, and in 1984, he debuted "Bob Downe", who went on to become his best-known character. After being very successful at the Edinburgh Festival Fringe in 1987, Trevorrow split his time touring between the UK and Australia. He has appeared extensively on television, released four albums, and written a book.

== Early life ==
He was raised in the Melbourne suburb of Murrumbeena, the third son of Alan, a builder-turned-teacher, and his wife Dorothy. He has a younger sister and two older brothers. In his teens, he came out to his family as gay. He attended Murrumbeena High School and was co-editor of the school magazine. That interest in journalism led him to become a copy boy at The Sun News-Pictorial starting at age 17, for five years. He moved on to theatre and cabaret, encouraged by the party atmosphere at the Melbourne production of The Rocky Horror Show every weekend.

== Career ==
Trevorrow first came to prominence in the cabaret duo Globos with Wendy De Waal, and they scored two Australian Top 20 hits with quirky covers of "Tintarella di luna" (1982) and Sonny & Cher's "The Beat Goes On" (1983), both of which were produced by Red Symons.

In 1984 he formed a comedy duo with Cathy Armstrong, in which his flamboyant alter ego Bob Downe was born. "Bob Downe" is a cheesy, safari suit wearing lounge singer with dazzling teeth, and host of the fictional regional daytime TV show Good Morning Murwillumbah. The distinction between the two personae is often blurred: Trevorrow and the "Prince of Polyester" both appear at events and host television programs.

In January 1987, Trevorrow went solo with the character at Sydney's Harold Park Hotel. In 1988 he took Bob Downe to the Edinburgh Festival Fringe, where he was a huge and instant success. Bob Downe played throughout the 1990s to ever-larger British audiences, with Trevorrow in perpetual commute between London and Sydney, touring nationally in both countries. With a multitude of UK TV credits under his beige belt, Bob Downe made his twelfth Edinburgh Fringe appearance in 2002.

Back in Australia, the first Bob Downe album, Greatest Hits, was released in Australia in 1996, with 1997's Jazzy! nominated for a Best Comedy Album ARIA music award. 1998 saw the Australian publication of his first book, All Bob Downe! (Penguin) and he hosted the Sydney Gay and Lesbian Mardi Gras Parade broadcast for Network Ten. In 1999 and 2000, Bob Downe again hosted the Mardi Gras Parade, a consistent ratings winner for Network Ten, and also won the Cabaret Artiste of the Year at the Green Room Awards in Melbourne. He released his third album, Huge Hits, in 2001. His comedy/chat series, The Bob Downe Show (Foxtel/TV1), went to air in December 2000. Bob Downe's last three national theatre tours, Million Sellers (1999), Whiter! Brighter! (2000) and Cold August Night (2002) were sellouts everywhere, including the Sydney Opera House and the State Theatre.

In 2001, Trevorrow made his first appearance as himself rather than his alter ego, opening a new show at the Black Cat cabaret in Melbourne. The show also appeared at the Sydney Opera House Studio in 2003, followed by a studio album It's About Time in 2004 (ABC Music/Universal). Trevorrow has appeared on the Australian series of Good News Week, often joining with host Paul McDermott in a sing-along of an Australian song at the end of the episode. He has collaborated several times with the Doug Anthony All Stars (which included McDermott), appearing in their TV series, DAAS Kapital, and their film The Edinburgh Years. He has also featured in episodes of the sitcom Kath & Kim, as well as hosting the series The Way We Were, and has appeared in the animated Australian/Canadian sitcom, Quads! as the voice of Spalding (SBS 2002). Trevorrow is a regular fill-in presenter on the "Evening Show" on 702 ABC Sydney. He has also been a contestant on the special Australia's Brainiest Comedian.

== Later career (2024–present) ==
In 2024 and 2025, Trevorrow toured nationally with Old Friends Sing Sondheim, a cabaret production celebrating the music of Stephen Sondheim, alongside Australian performer Rupert Noffs and musical director Bev Kennedy. The tour included performances at major venues across Australia and was noted in national LGBTQ+ and arts publications.

Beginning in 2025, Trevorrow co-presented Old Friends Sing Sundays, a live cabaret residency at Ginger's at The Oxford Hotel in Taylor Square, Sydney, with Noffs and Kennedy. The residency featured a revue of musical theatre standards performed with a live band, and was reviewed in Limelight, which described the show's blend of musicality and performance artistry.

In 2025, Trevorrow also presented Choose Bob – 40 Ridiculous Years, a stage show marking four decades of his Bob Downe character. The production played to audiences at Adelaide's Thebarton Theatre and other Australian venues, with coverage in theatre reviews noting its mix of comedy and classic pop repertoire.

== Bob Downe discography ==
=== Albums ===
List of albums
Title	Album details
Greatest Hits	Released: 1996; Label: ORIGiN (OR 018); Formats: CD
Jazzy!	Released: 1997; Label: ORIGiN (OR 035); Formats: CD; Recorded Live
Huge Hits	Released: 2001; Label: Rajon Music Group (RMGR0105); Formats: 2×CD; Various Artist compilation
It's About Time	Released: 2004; Label: ABC Music; Formats: CD

=== Singles ===
Title	Year	Album
"Yeh yeh"	1996	Greatest Hits
"I Will Survive"	2001	Huge Hits

== Awards and nominations ==
=== ARIA Music Awards ===
The ARIA Music Awards are a set of annual ceremonies presented by Australian Recording Industry Association (ARIA), which recognise excellence, innovation, and achievement across all genres of the music of Australia. They commenced in 1987.

Year	Nominee / work	Award	Result	Ref.
1997	Jazzy!	Best Comedy Release	Nominated	

== Filmography ==
Title	Year	Role
Up Yer Festival (TV series)	1990	Bob Downe
The Money or the Gun (TV series)	1990	Bob Downe
DAAS: The Edinburgh Years	1991	Bob Downe
DAAS Kapital (TV series)	1991–1992	Bob Downe
Camp Christmas (TV movie)	1993	Bob Downe
Just for laughs (TV series)		
Lily Savage at the Garrick Theatre(video)	1995	Bob Downe
Melbourne International Comedy Festival (TV series)	1996	Bob Downe
The Lilly Savage Show (TV series)	1997	Strip Club Host
Bob Downe All Over Britain (TV series)	1998	Bob Downe
Mr. Accident	2000	Fridge Salesman (as Bob Downe)
The Bob Downe Show	2000–2001	Bob Downe
Quads (TV series)	2001–2002	Additional Voices
Da Kath and Kim Code	2005	Daryl Lee
Kath and Kim (TV series)	2002–2007	Daryl Lee
A Chair with a View (short)	2008	Governor Macquarie
Kath and Kimderella (film)	2012	Marko
Colin From Accounts (TV series)	2026	Stuart Molden

=== Books ===
- Trevorrow, Mark (1998). All Bob Downe!. Ringwood, Vic.: Penguin Books. ISBN 9780140270112.
