= Steve Bastoni =

Australian actor (born 1966)

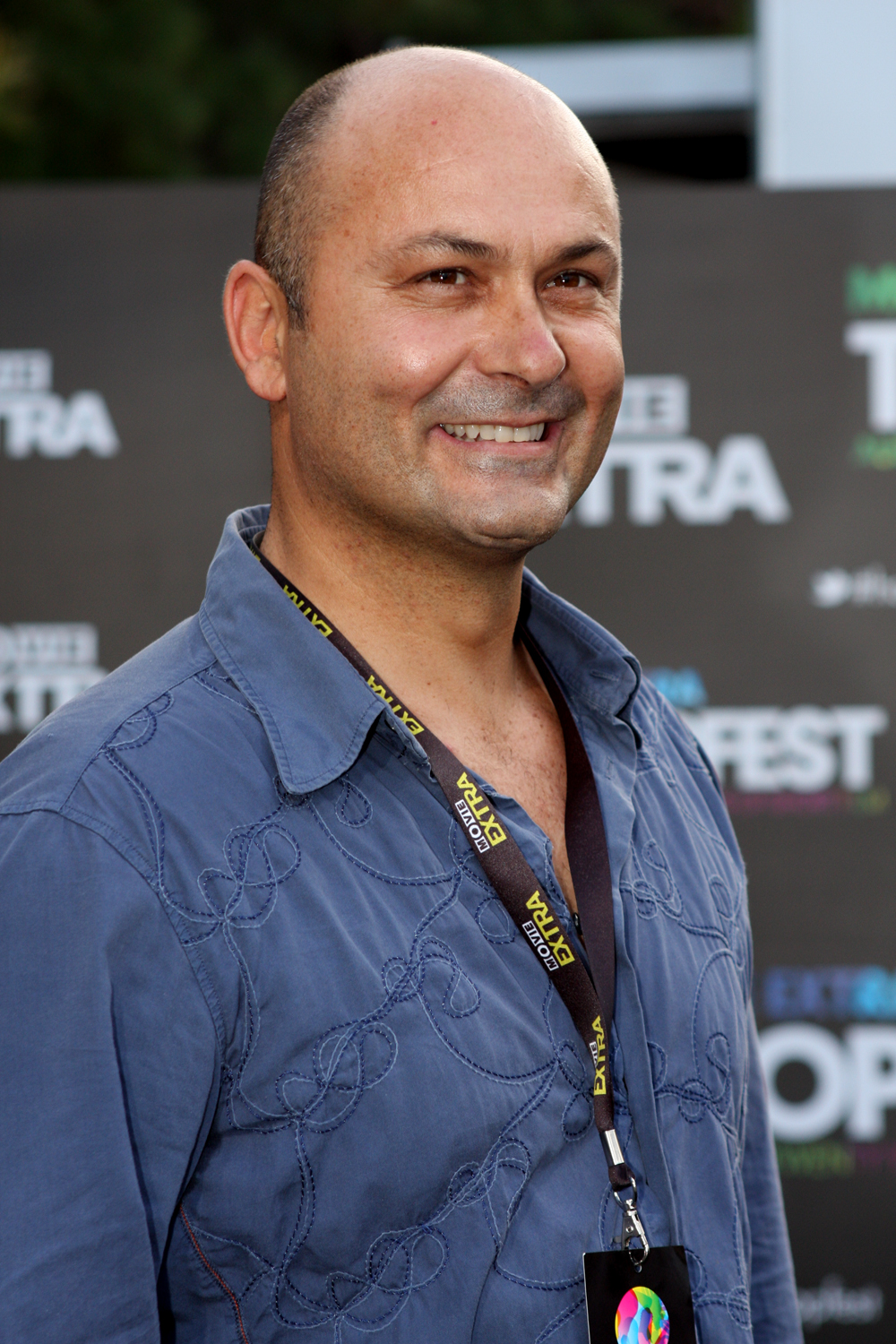
- Bastoni in Sydney, 2012
- Born: 4 March 1966 (age 60); Rome, Italy
- Occupation: Actor
- Years active: 1976–present
- Spouse: Bianca Pirrotta (m. 2007)
- Children: 3

Steve Bastoni (born 4 March 1966) is an Italian-born Australian actor. He is best known for his role as Angel in Police Rescue and as Steve Parker in Neighbours.

His credits from over three decades as a working actor include The Matrix Reloaded, Blue Murder, Wentworth, Broke, Hawaii Five-0, The Water Diviner, Poker Face and many more.

== Early life ==
Bastoni was born in Rome, Italy, to Australian mother Val and Italian father Raffaele. His father was a five-time Italian kayak champion who competed for Italy in the double kayak event at the 1952 Helsinki Olympic Games.

Bastoni’s interest in acting began after seeing a London production of the Andrew Lloyd Webber musical Joseph and the Amazing Technicolor Dreamcoat at the age of six.

When he was eight, Bastoni relocated to Melbourne with his mother and two sisters, after his parents separated. He often spent his childhood summers on the Mornington Peninsula, learning to surf in Sorrento. At age ten, Bastoni performed an amateur production alongside his mother, at the Adelaide Fringe. At primary school he often scored lead roles in the school productions, and performed in a school play called Minestrone, at the age of 11. He largely learnt acting on the job. While working a part-time job at an Italian restaurant in the inner city suburb of Carlton, Bastoni performed at La Mama, earning the nickname 'Hollywood' from his co-workers.

At the age of 16, Bastoni landed a role in short film Skipping Class, after which time he signed with an agent and got an Actors Equity Card. As a teenager, he also played basketball at state level, competing against former professional player Andrew Gaze in the under-16s.

== Career ==
=== Film and television ===
One of Bastoni's earliest screen roles was opposite Ben Mendelsohn, Nadine Garner and Greg Fleet in 1986 film The Still Point. He also had a recurring role in prison drama series Prisoner that same year.

At the age of 24, Bastoni landed his first lead role in a television series, playing Constable Yannis 'Angel' Angelopoulos in Police Rescue, alongside Gary Sweet, from 1991 to 1996. The role saw him twice nominated for an AFI Award for Best Lead Actor.

During this time, Bastoni also appeared in 1993 film The Heartbreak Kid, alongside Claudia Karvan and breakout star Alex Dimitriades. After his tenure on Police Rescue, Bastoni spent three months in America, where he was offered a five-episode stint in the series Superboy. Unable to procure a work permit in time, he was forced to turn down the offer. He went on to appear in other Australian series such as Wildside (1998) and Stingers (1999–2002).

In 1999, Bastoni starred with Adam Baldwin in Frances Ford Coppola’s adaptation of Dr Jekyll and Mr Hyde. This was followed by a role in 2000 Golden Globe-nominated television film On the Beach, opposite Bryan Brown, Rachel Ward and Armand Assante. He also starred in 2000 film 15 Amore, earning him a nomination for the AACTA Award for Best Actor in a Leading Role for his performance as Alfredo, as well as a Film Critics Circle nomination in the same category.

He next appeared in the 2001 films South Pacific alongside Glenn Close and Harry Connick Jr., and He Died With a Felafel in His Hand opposite Noah Taylor. In 2002, he had a role in The Crocodile Hunter: Collision Course before appearing in 2003 blockbuster The Matrix Reloaded with Keanu Reeves. 2006 saw him in Suburban Mayhem (2006).

In 2007, Bastoni began playing another of his best known roles, as Steve Parker in long-running soap opera Neighbours, a role he undertook until 2009. From 2009 to 2010, he hosted Missing Persons Unit, replacing Mike Munro. In 2010, he also appeared in the third installment of the Underbelly franchise, Underbelly: The Golden Mile, as Louis Bayeh.

Bastoni appeared in an episode of Sea Patrol, temporarily replacing Mike Flynn as the Commanding Officer aboard the fictional RAN vessel HMAS Hammersley, before playing the role of Don Kaplan in critically acclaimed Australian prison drama Wentworth. He also played homicide detective, Charlie Bezzina in Fat Tony & Co., a 2014 spin-off series of Underbelly, based on the Melbourne gangland war.

Other television credits include appearances in award-winning miniseries Blue Murder, The Alice, Rush, Mr & Mrs Murder and the comedies Lowdown, Upper Middle Bogan, The Wrong Girl and How to Stay Married, as well as US series Hawaii Five-0.

Bastoni appeared in the 2013 film Drift, alongside Sam Worthington and Xavier Samuel, before playing the role of Omer in 2014 film The Water Diviner, alongside Russell Crowe. He starred as Steve in Truth (2015) alongside Cate Blanchett and Robert Redford, and appeared in 2016 sport film Broke.

More recently, Bastoni has starred in Channel 9 drama series Bad Mothers in 2019, alongside Mandy McElhinney, Daniel MacPherson and Michala Banas. He also appeared in 2021 miniseries Australian Gangster and 2022 Russell Crowe-lead thriller film Poker Face.

Bastoni has also written and directed several short films, the first of which, The Gift, won several international awards. The film was shown in parliament in New South Wales and is part of the curriculum in Canada, where it is used to generate discussions about mental health.

=== Stage ===
Bastoni's theatre work includes the playing role of Rocky in the 1987 Australian national tour of The Rocky Horror Show starring Daniel Abineri. Abineri then gave him the role of Charlie Fortune in his controversial rock musical Bad Boy Johnny and the Prophets of Doom in 1989, starring alongside Russell Crowe and Nadine Garner.

He notably starred in Cameron Mackintosh's 2002 big budget musical production of Oliver! directed by Sam Mendes, which toured nationally and to Singapore. He played the role of Bill Sikes, alongside John Waters and Tamsin Carroll.

In 2012, Bastoni performed in Everynight, Everynight at Melbourne's Gasworks, for Frank Theatre Company, and in Jager Productions’ Barassi, as AFL legend Ron Barassi. He also appeared in a 2013 Belvoir production of The Threepenny Opera, playing Macheath.

In 2019, Bastoni starred in Arthur Miller’s A View from the Bridge, marking his debut for Melbourne Theatre Company. The same year, he also played the lead role of Jay Conway in Ulster American for Melbourne's Red Stitch Actors Theatre. He was nominated for Green Room Awards for both roles, as well as one for his earlier turn in Ben Elton’s Popcorn in 1999.

=== Other activities ===
Bastoni serves as the founder and coordinator for the annual Peninsula Film Festival, held in Melbourne since 2011, and Victoria's biggest outdoor film festival.

== Personal life ==
Bastoni was in a relationship with actress Sarah Lambert, whom he met when she appeared in a 1991 episode of Police Rescue. He was also in a relationship with actress Melissa George in the mid-1990s. He was later in a long-term relationship with TV star Nina Zandnia.

Bastoni is married to Bianca Pirrotta, whom he met at the Melbourne International Comedy Festival in 2005. They moved in together in Sydney not long after their courtship began. When Pirotta fell pregnant, the couple moved to Melbourne to be closer to family. They married in October 2007, three months after the birth of their first son. Together, the couple now have two sons and a daughter and live in the Melbourne suburb of Rosebud.

Bastoni has been open about his past struggles with addiction prior to the age of 40, crediting the birth of his son with turning his life around and finding recovery. Bastoni studied a Certificate 4 in Mental Health while making mental health plans and programs for workers in the mining industry. He conducts workshops in schools, encouraging young people to talk about their life experiences, in association with Australian not-for-profit suicide prevention organisation, R U OK?.

== Awards ==
Year	Work	Award	Category	Result	Ref.
1991	Police Rescue	AFI Awards	Best Performance by an Actor in a Leading Role in a Television Drama	Nominated	
1996	Police Rescue	AFI Awards	Best Performance by an Actor in a Leading Role in a Television Drama	Nominated	
1999	Popcorn	Green Room Awards	Best Male Actor in a Leading Role	Nominated	
2000	15 Amore	AACTA Awards	Best Actor in a Leading Role	Nominated	
2001	15 Amore	Film Critics Circle	Best Actor – Male	Nominated	
2020	A View from the Bridge	Green Room Awards	Outstanding Performance	Nominated	
2020	Ulster American	Green Room Awards		Nominated	

== Filmography ==
=== Film ===
Year	Title	Role	Notes	Ref.
1983	Skipping Class	Steve	Short	
1984	Melvin, Son of Alvin	Bullo		
1986	The Still Point	David		
1987	The Lighthorsemen	Turkish Demolition Soldier		
1989	Closer and Closer Apart	Sam	Direct-to-video	
1993	The Heartbreak Kid	Dimitri Yiannos		
1997	Wanted	Rico		
1998	15 Amore	Alfredo		
2001	He Died with a Felafel in His Hand	Sydney Police Officer 2		
2002	The Crocodile Hunter: Collision Course	Deputy Director Reynolds		
2003	The Matrix Reloaded	Captain Soren		
2005	Man-Thing	Rene LaRoque		
2005	Fink! (aka Pros and Ex-Cons)	Willing		
2006	Suburban Mayhem	Detective Robert Andretti		
2006	Macbeth	Banquo		
2006	One Last Shot	Detective	Short	
2007	St George		Short	
2008	The Plex	The Baron / 'Mad' Morgan Edwards		
2011	The Tea Party	Cubby	Short	
2012	Thought Tracker	President Stanton	Short	
2013	Drift	Miller		
2014	The Water Diviner	Ömer		
2015	Truth	Gil Schwartz		
2015	Damage Control	The Killer	Short	
2016	Broke	Sherro		
2018	The Widow	Antonio Monaco	Short	
2019	The Whistleblower	Harrison's Gunman		
2021	Streamline	Glenn Goodman		
2021	Him	Tom Ridgen		
2022	262 Our Stories So Far		Short	
2022	Poker Face	Paul Muccino		
2022	Fumblelove	Mack	Short	
2024	Take My Hand	George		
2025	The Mediator	Mick Gatto	Short	
2025	Bang			

=== Television ===
Year	Title	Role	Notes	Ref.
1983	Home	Colin	Season 1, episodes 25 & 26	
1983	A Descant for Gossips	Howard	TV movie	
1984	Waterfront	Emilio Callini	Miniseries, 3 episodes	
1984	Special Squad		Season 1, episode 17: "Wild Man"	
1985	A Hard Bargain	Mario		
1985	Neighbours	Alex Baxter	Season 1, episode 154	
1986	Prisoner	Peter McCormack	Season 8, 11 episodes	
1989	Il Magistrato to	Robbie Shaw	Miniseries, 6 episodes	
1991	G.P.	Vic Graziano	Season 3, episode 8	
1991–1996	Police Rescue	Yiannis 'Angel' Angelopoulos	Main role: Seasons 1–5, 59 episodes	
1992	Six Pack	Johnny	Season 1, episode 2	
1992	Frankie's House	G.I. Jarvis	Miniseries	
1994	Time Trax	Gerald	Season 2, episode 10	
1995	Blue Murder	Detective Michael Drury	Miniseries, 2 episodes	
1995	Natural Justice: Heat	Paul Tancred	TV film	
1997	Flipper	Lt. Cmdr. Mercer	Season 2, episode 9	
1997	Twisted Tales	Constable Paul Bell	Season 1, episode 1	
1998	Wildside	Eric Foley	Season 1, 4 episodes	
1998	The Fury Within	Dr. Stephen Johnson	TV film	
1999	Without Warning	Arch Whitelaw	TV film	
1999; 2002	Stingers	Billy Robardi / Nigel Finster	2 episodes	
2000	The Lost World	Ramses	Season 1, episode 18	
2000	On the Beach	First Officer Neil Hirsch	TV film	
2000	Dr. Jekyll and Mr. Hyde	McAfee / Newcomen	TV film	
2000	Tales of the South Seas		Season 1, episode 17	
2000; 2001	Beastmaster	Maloc	Season 2, episodes 5 & 12	
2001	South Pacific	Lt. Buzz Adams	TV film	
2002	Counterstrike	Captain Kram	TV film	
2005; 2006	The Alice	Greg	Season 1, episodes 6 & 21	
2006	Fatal Contact: Bird Flu in America	FEMA Director McGarrett	TV film	
2007	All Saints	Morgan Garrett	Season 10, episode 12	
2007–2009	Neighbours	Steve Parker	Main role: Seasons 23–25, 322 episodes	
2009–2010	Missing Persons Unit	Host	Documentary series	
2010	Sleuth 101	Harry	1 episode	
2010	Sea Patrol	Steve Coburn	Season 4, episode 2	
2010	The Golden Mile	Louis Bayeh	Season 3, 6 episodes	
2010	Rush	Boogie	Season 3, episode 21	
2012	Lowdown	Brad Gordon	Season 2, episode 7	
2013	Mr & Mrs Murder	Marcus James	Season 1, episode 9	
2014	Fat Tony & Co.	Homicide Det. Charlie Bezzina	Miniseries, 5 episodes	
2014	Upper Middle Bogan	Benji Amenta	Season 2, episodes 4 & 7	
2015	Hawaii Five-0	Tom Bishop	Season 6, episodes 4 & 8	
2016	The Wrong Girl	Craig Peterson	Season 1, episodes 4, 5 & 7	
2016–2017	Wentworth	Don Kaplan	Seasons 4–5, 8 episodes	
2018	How to Stay Married	Lenny	Season 1, episode 3	
2019	Bad Mothers	Tom	Main role: Season 1, 7 episodes	
2019	Welfare	Jon Karagiannis	Main role: Season 1, 6 episodes	
2020	Aussiewood	Tony Taranto		
2021	Australian Gangster	Joe Barbaro	Miniseries, 2 episodes	
2021	Fires	Vince Rocca	Miniseries, 1 episode	
2022	Garrison7			
2022	The Younger Man		Podcast series	
2023	Utopia	Minister Assisting	Season 5, episode 1	
2024–2025	Darby and Joan	Chris Steele	Season 2, 5 episodes	
2026	Dear Life	Geoff Parry	TV series: 2 episodes	

== Theatre ==
Year	Title	Role	Notes	Ref.
1985	The Journey		La Mama Theatre, Universal Theatre, Melbourne	
1986	Cafe Misto		Spoleto Festival, Melbourne	
1987–1988	The Rocky Horror Show	Rocky	Princess Theatre, Melbourne, Lyric Theatre, Brisbane, Theatre Royal, Sydney, Her Majesty's Theatre, Sydney, Comedy Theatre, Melbourne	
1989	Bad Boy Johnny and the Prophets of Doom	Charlie Fortune	Church Theatre, Hawthorn, Comedy Theatre, Melbourne	
1991	The Dreamer Examines His Pillow		Wharf Theatre, Sydney with STC	
1999	Popcorn	Wayne	Melbourne Athenaeum	
2002	Oliver!	Bill Sikes	Lyric Theatre, Sydney, Regent Theatre, Melbourne, Singapore	
2005	Show Us Your Roots 3	Comedian	Canberra Theatre	
2012	Everynight, Everynight		Gasworks, Melbourne with Frank Theatre Company	
2012	Barassi	Ron Barassi	Jager Productions	
2013	The Threepenny Opera	Macheath	Belvoir, Sydney	
2019	A View from the Bridge	Eddie Carbone	Southbank Theatre, Melbourne with MTC	
2019	Ulster American	Lead	Red Stitch Actors Theatre	
2026	West Gate	Victor	MTC	
