= Greeks on the Roof =

- Genre: Comedy
- Starring: Mary Coustas; María Mercedes; Serge De Nardo; Evelyn Krape
- Country of origin: Australia
- Original language: English
- No. of seasons: 1
- No. of episodes: 11

Production
- Running time: 60 minutes

Original release
- Network: Seven Network
- Release: 1 April – 1 July 2003

Greeks on the Roof is a short-lived Australian television talk show and variety show that ran for 11 episodes on the Seven Network from 1 April to 1 July 2003. It was hosted by the actress/comedian Mary Coustas in character as Effie, a second generation Greek Australian, whom she had portrayed on the sitcom Acropolis Now, and featured her "family" of Greek immigrants portrayed by Maria Mercedes, Angus Sampson as cousin Dimi, Serge De Nardo, and Evelyn Krape.

== Format ==
Based on the format of the British TV show The Kumars at No. 42, each show had interviews with a number of Australian actors and actresses. Guests were involved in Effie's jokes and antics while being asked about their career and personal life.

== Cast ==
=== Main / regular ===
- Mary Coustas as Host (as Effie)
- María Mercedes as Poppy
- Serge De Nardo
- Evelyn Krape
- Angus Sampson as Dimi

=== Guests ===
- Sam Newman
- Molly Meldrum
- Dr. Harry Cooper
- Jerry Springer

== Production ==
Kris Noble was the executive producer of the show.
