= Closer and Closer Apart =

- Directed by: Steve Middleton
- Written by: Angela Salamanca
- Based on: opera La Cavalleria Rusticana by Mascagni
- Produced by: Rosa Colosimo
- Starring: Steve Bastoni; George Harlem; Marie-Louise Walker
- Production company: Rosa Colosimo Films
- Distributed by: Force Video (video)
- Release date: 1989
- Running time: 88 minutes
- Country: Australia
- Language: English

Closer and Closer Apart is a 1989 Australian film set in the Italian community of Melbourne. The story concerns a quarter of working-class people in their twenties.

== Cast ==
- George Harlem
- Marie-Louise Walker
- Steve Bastoni as Sam
- George Kapiniaris as Enzo Vozza
