= Effie Stephanidis =

Comedic character played by Mary Coustas

Efthimia Francesca Stephanidis, better known as just "Effie", is an outrageous comedic character played by Australian actress Mary Coustas. Coustas depicts a stereotypical second-generation Greek Australian.

== History ==
=== Origins ===
The character originated in the popular Seven network comedy program Acropolis Now, which ran from 1989 to 1992. Since then, the character has appeared in Effie, Just Quietly (2001), and hosting the short-lived 2003 talk show Greeks On The Roof (based on the British series The Kumars at No. 42) in character with other actors playing her family. She has also appeared in a number of television commercials (most recently for AAPT).

Effie's catchphrases include "How embarrassment!" (see malapropism) in response to any potentially embarrassing situation. She greets people with "Hello, good thanks" before they have even asked her how she is feeling.

=== 1992: Recording ===
In 1992, "Effie" released a novelty single: a duet with another fictional character, Garry McDonald's Norman Gunston, recording their version of Andrew Lloyd Webber's "Amigos Para Siempre", the official song of the 1992 Summer Olympics (originally performed by Sarah Brightman and José Carreras). The single reached the Top 20 chart in Australia.

Coustas wrote a book based on the character: Effie’s Guide to Being Up Yourself (ISBN 0-7336-1761-1), published in September 2003 by Mark McLeod Books.

=== 2021 ===
Effie returned to the stage with Hello Good Thanks - Better Out Than In comedy show.

== Discography ==
=== Singles ===
Title	Year	Peak chart positions
Title	Year	AUS
"Amigos Para Siempre (Friends for Life)" (with Norman Gunston)	1992	27

== Awards ==
=== ARIA Music Awards ===
The ARIA Music Awards are a set of annual ceremonies presented by Australian Recording Industry Association (ARIA), which recognise excellence, innovation, and achievement across all genres of the music of Australia. They commenced in 1987.

Year	Nominee / work	Award	Result	Ref.
1993	"Amigos Para Siempre"/"Venereal Girl (Tribute to Madonna)" (with Norman Gunston)	Best Comedy Release	Nominated	

== See also ==
- Malapropism
