= The Magic Pudding (film) =

- Region 4 DVD cover
- Directed by: Karl Zwicky
- Screenplay by: Harry Cripps; Greg Haddrick; Simon Hopkinson
- Based on: The Magic Pudding by Norman Lindsay
- Produced by: Gerry Travers; Paddy Conroy; Bruce Davey; Carmel Travers; Edward Trost
- Starring: Sam Neill; Geoffrey Rush; Hugo Weaving; Jack Thompson; Toni Collette; John Cleese
- Edited by: Richard Hindley
- Music by: Chris Harriott
- Production companies: Energee Entertainment; New South Wales Film and Television Office; Australian Broadcasting Corporation; Premium Movie Partnership
- Distributed by: 20th Century Fox
- Release date: 14 December 2000
- Running time: 80 minutes
- Country: Australia
- Language: English
- Budget: A$12 million (estimated)
- Box office: A$1.1 million

The Magic Pudding is a 2000 Australian animated musical adventure comedy film loosely adapted from the 1918 book of the same name by Norman Lindsay. Directed by Karl Zwicky, the film features a voice cast of well known actors including Sam Neill, Geoffrey Rush, Hugo Weaving, Jack Thompson, Toni Collette and John Cleese.

The film was produced by the Australian studio Energee Entertainment. The studio shut down in 2002 due to financial losses from the film.

== Plot ==
In the South Pole, Bill Barnacle, his first mate Sam Sawnoff and crewman Buncle are shipwrecked. After Bill stops a starving Buncle from eating Sam, the iceberg cracks and produces Albert, a rude, everlasting magic steak and kidney pudding who demands that they continue to eat him. Buncle runs off with the pudding and claims it as his own, but the ice breaks and he falls into the sea. Bill and Sam manage to rescue the pudding, and after briefly mourning the apparent loss of Buncle, they choose to protect it from thievery.

Ten years later, a young koala named Bunyip Bluegum discovers that he is not an orphan and sets out on a quest to find his parents, Meg and Tom Bluegum. Bill and Sam agree to help Bunyip after the latter stops an attempt by the pudding thieves to steal Albert. After Albert runs off, desiring to challenge anyone to catch him, Bunyip tries to ask a bandicoot with a watermelon for help. Initially avoiding the question, the Bandicoot tells Bunyip that the only one not afraid to reveal the answer is the frog on the log.

As Bunyip and the others set out to find the frog on the log, Buncle is revealed to be alive and living underground with slaves, including Bunyip's parents bringing him food while he waits for the pudding thieves (his nephew Watkin and his friend Patrick O'Possum) to bring him Albert. After foiling another attempt by the thieves, Bunyip falls into a creek where he dreams about his parents, before meeting the frog on the log. The frog tells him to solve a riddle to find the place where they were last seen: "Where two gums meet, yet stand alone, there's plenty of water, but dry as a bone". The pudding thieves finally succeed in stealing Albert by starting a fire as a distraction, but the pudding owners find their house, and Bunyip lures them outside before escaping with Albert.

Later, as Albert mocks him, Bunyip loses his temper and kicks Albert into two interwoven trees, soon coming to realize that they solved the riddle and found the right place, two gum trees overlooking a valley with a dam that feeds water into a town called Tiralu. As the pudding owners head to the town, the thieves open the dam before heading after them. The water floods the town, but Bunyip uses Albert to fill sacks and make a dam. The grateful residents celebrate, but when Bunyip explains his quest, the townspeople take them to the entrance of Buncle's underground lair, saying no one ever comes out. Bunyip is ready to give up on finding his parents, but Albert slides down inside in his bowl, followed by Bunyip, Bill and Sam. Inside, Buncle is berating the thieves when Albert bounces into his lap. Buncle has the thieves thrown in with the slaves before celebrating the capture of the pudding.

The pudding owners arrive and Bunyip and Bill free the slaves while Sam distracts Buncle by dressing as a woman. Bunyip eventually realizes that one of the freed slaves is his parents, Meg and Tom, and the Bluegum family reunites. The pudding owners then attempt to rescue Albert from Buncle, and as he tries to eat Albert, they demand Albert for a double serving, intending to give Buncle the double. As Albert splits, his good and evil half fight, however, Buncle demands a million serving which makes Albert quickly grow bigger until he breaks out of the cavern. Buncle then demands for 'all the puddings in the world', but unwittingly falls into Albert's mouth to be spat out far away. Albert splits into millions of puddings in space before turning back to normal and falling back into his bowl and back to Earth. Assuming he's dead, Bill and Sam mourn their loss, but Sam's tears revive Albert, and all rejoice.

Later, Bill, Sam, and Albert are living peacefully with the Bluegums, Rumpus and Wattleby, as the two pudding thieves try to get Albert for themselves, only for the pudding owners to thwart them once again. Meanwhile, Buncle has been flown back to the South Pole, finding himself stranded in the middle of the sea on an ice block, where he bemoans his defeat and falls unconscious as the ice block floats away.

== Cast ==
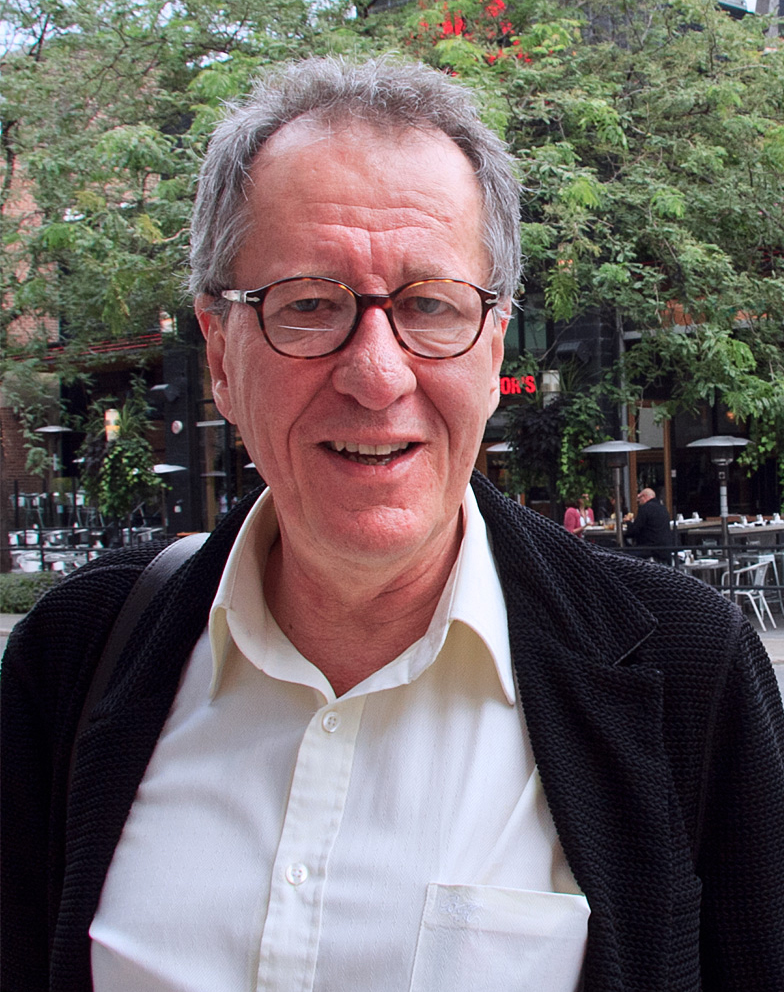
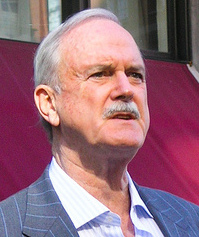
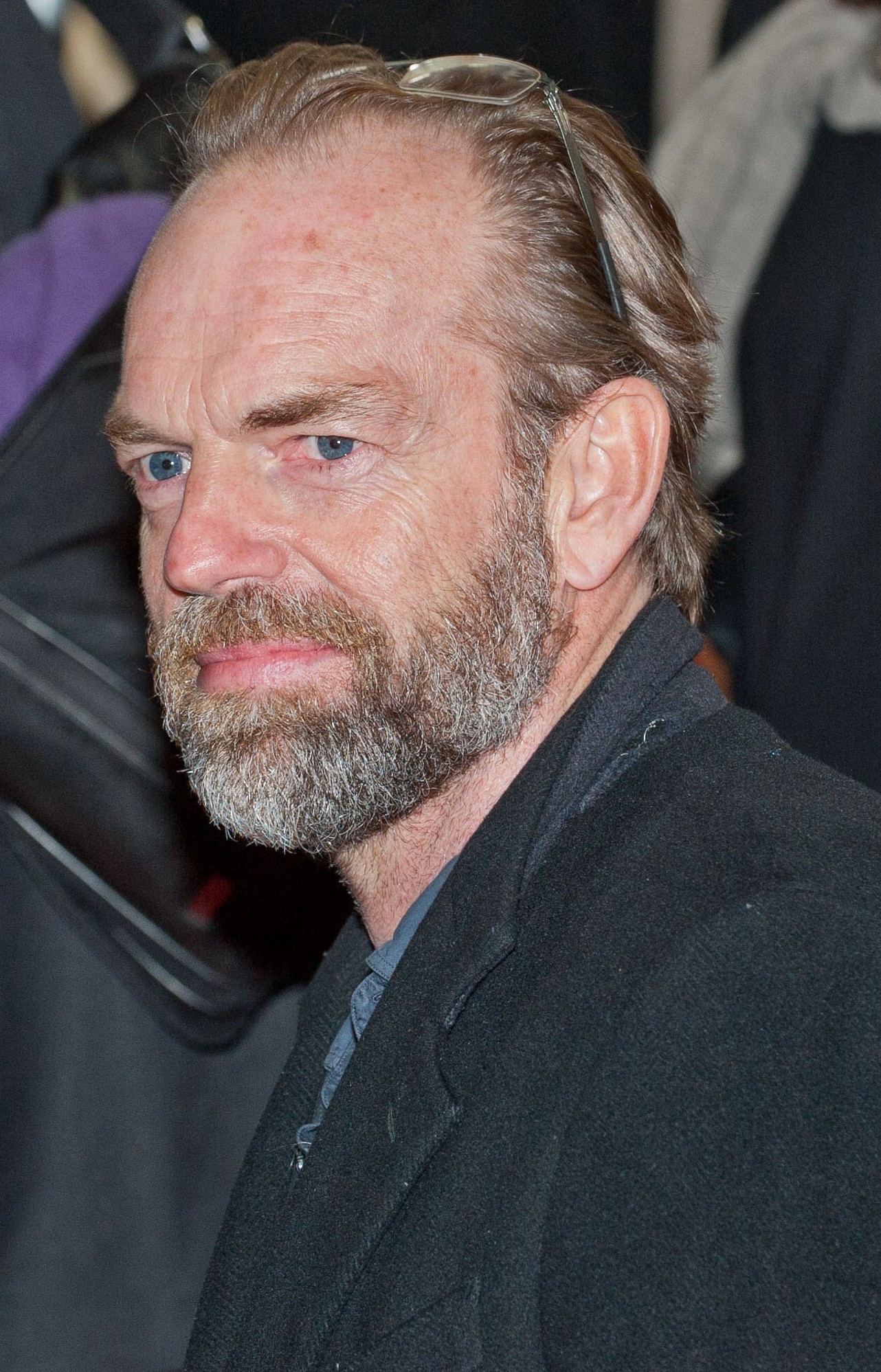
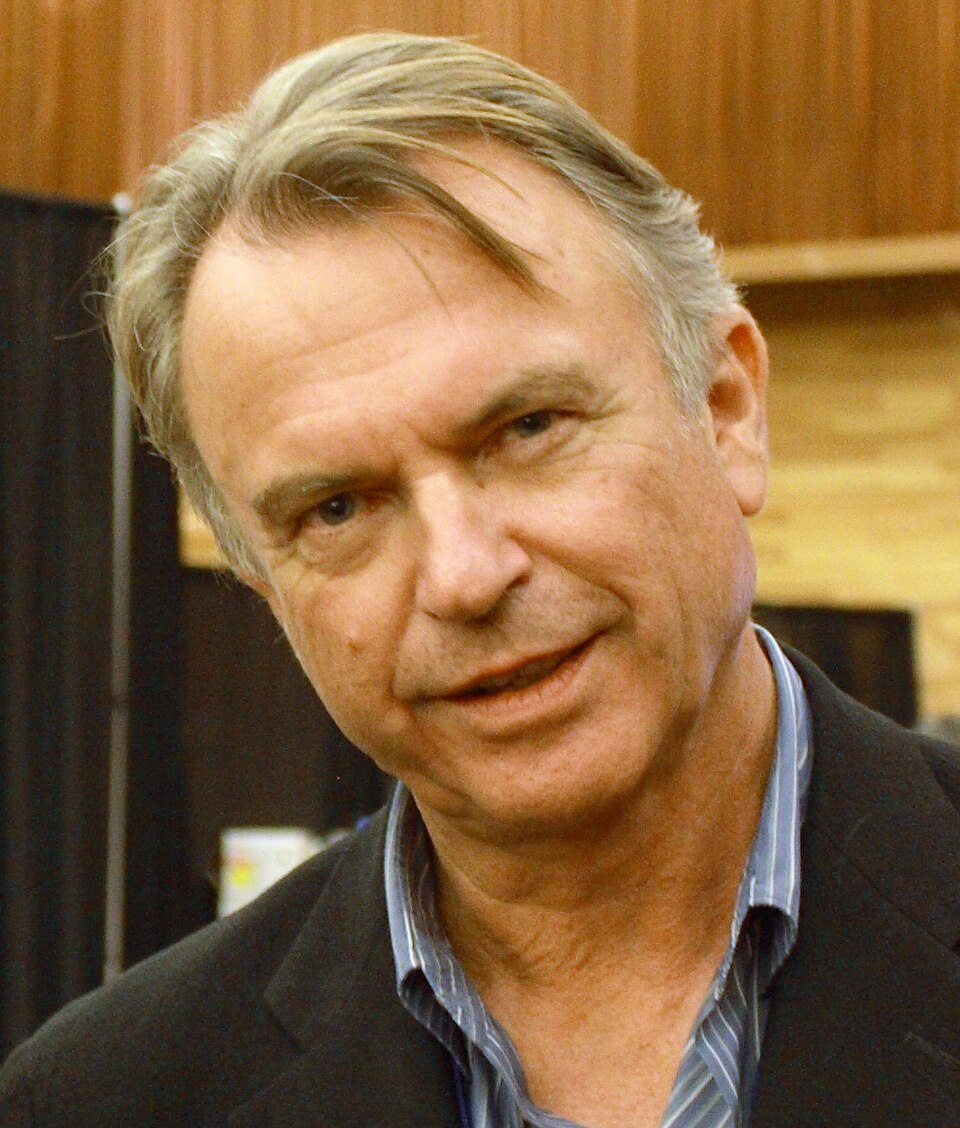
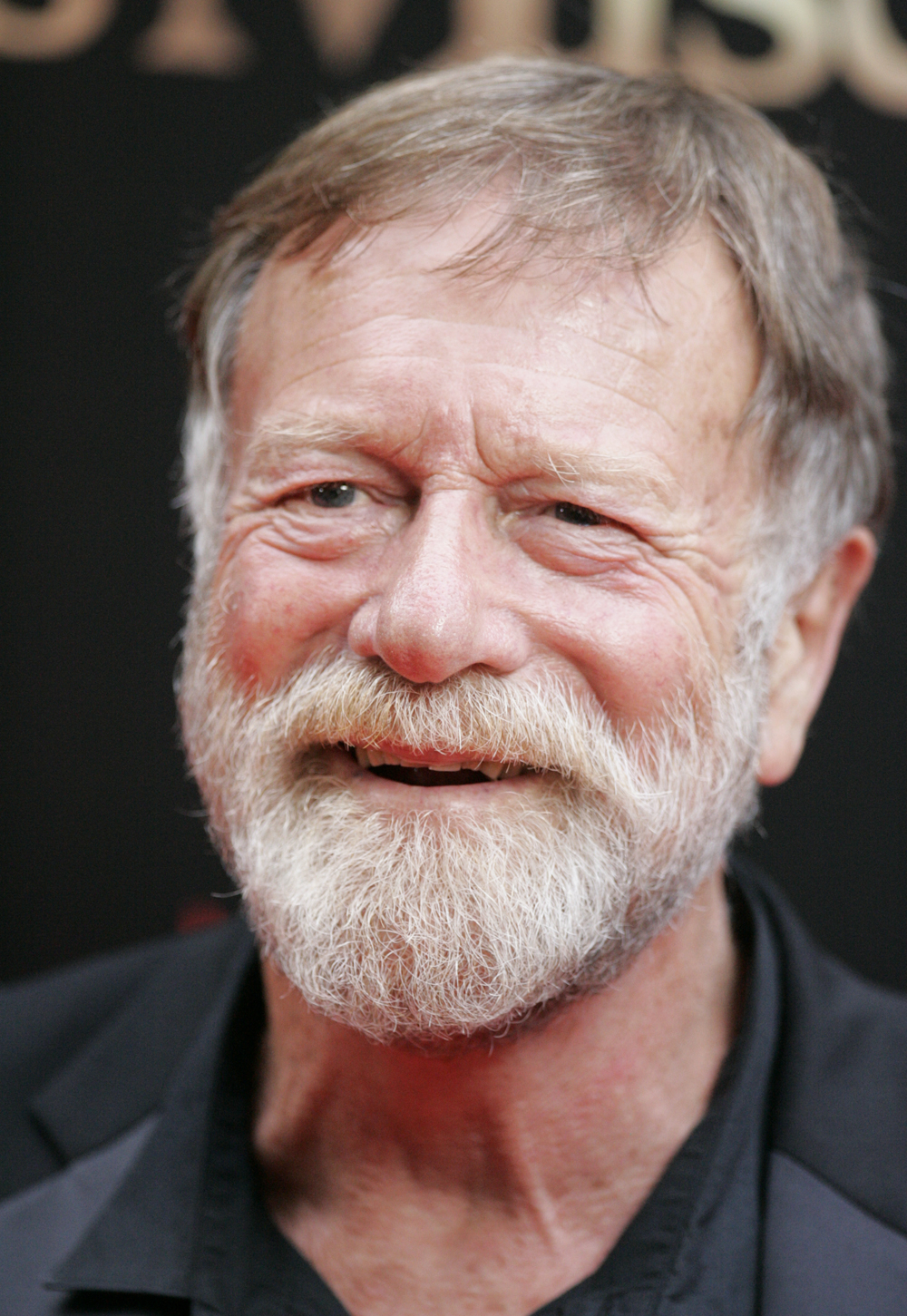
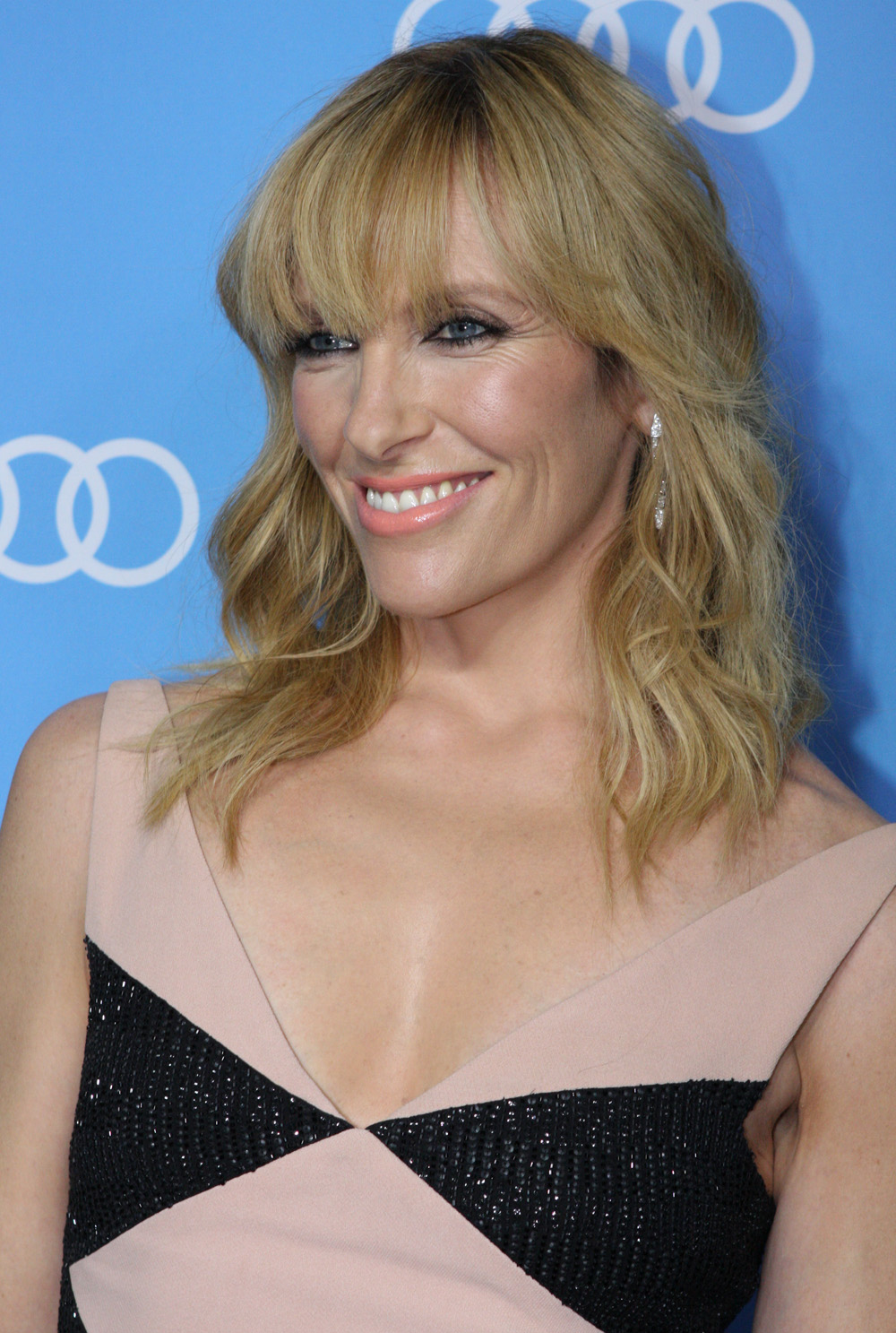
Geoffrey Rush, John Cleese, Hugo Weaving, and Sam Neill play the animated characters from the book (top) Jack Thompson, and Toni Collette (bottom) play the characters in the Australian animated musical film.
- John Cleese as Albert the Magic Pudding: A bad-mannered, living steak and kidney pudding who lasts forever and turns into different sorts of puddings.
- Geoffrey Rush as Bunyip Bluegum: An accomplished young koala that leaves home in search of his lost parents.
- Hugo Weaving as Bill Barnacle: A human sailor who leads the noble society of Pudding owners group.
- Sam Neill as Sam Sawnoff: An emperor penguin who is a shipmate of Bill Barnacle's cruise.
- Jack Thompson as Buncle: An evil wombat who is looking for the magic pudding for himself to eat forever. Also a former shipmate of Bill Barnacle's cruise.
- Toni Collette as Meg Bluegum: The mother of Bunyip Bluegum.
- Roy Billing as Tom Bluegum: The father of Bunyip Bluegum.
- Greg Carroll as Watkin Wombat: The nephew of Buncle who is one of the pudding thieves who has to catch and bring the pudding to him.
- Dave Gibson as Patrick O'Possum, a possum who is The wombats helper of the pudding thieves, and as Wattleberry: the uncle of Bunyip Bluegum.
- Mary Coustas as Ginger: is the right-hand mouse of Buncle.
- John Laws as Rumpus Bumpus: A wise old friend of Bunyip Bluegum.
- Sandy Gore as Frog on the Log: a female frog who helps Bunyip to finding his parents.
- Michael Veitch as Fergus the Bandicoot: He carries the Watermelon.
- Peter Gwynne as Benjamin Brandysnap: An elderly Basset Hound who owns a grocery store, once a friend of the pudding thieves, now betrayed by them after they stole his grocery bag and joined the pudding owners for revenge.
- Robyn Moore as Henrietta Hedgehog
- Martin Vaughan as Parrot
- Gerry Connolly as Dobson Dorking

== Production ==
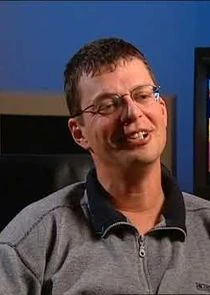
Karl Zwicky direct the animated film.

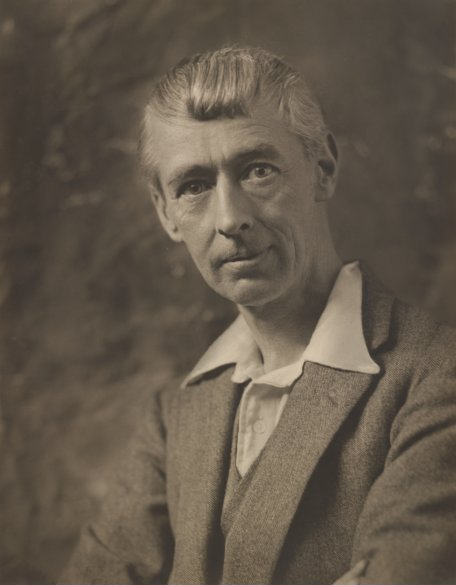
Norman Lindsay, author of the original Magic Pudding book from 1918.

The Lindsay family had previously rejected many international requests to sell the rights to The Magic Pudding, preferring to wait until an Australian company presented the right formula for adaptation. Past contenders were Rolf Harris, Jim Henson Productions and even Walt Disney himself. Eventually, in 1997, the Lindsays sold the film rights to Energee Entertainment, one of the country's then-leading independent animation companies.

== Release ==
The film was first released in Australia on 14 December 2000, and was released theatrically by the local branch of 20th Century Fox.

The VHS tape and DVD were released in Australia in May 2001 by Roadshow Entertainment.

It was then released in New Zealand four months later after the Australian release on 9 April 2001.

A re-release of the DVD was released in Australia in 2013.

The film is currently available for streaming on Amazon Prime and Roku in North America.

It was also on Tubi for a bit.

== Critical reception ==
The Magic Pudding was released to mixed reviews with most critics perceiving it as a failed attempt to do justice to Lindsay's work.

Australian critics, such as Louise Keller, Andrew L. Urban, and David Edwards, have given the film positive reviews.

Award	Category	Subject	Result
AACTA Awards (2001 AFI Awards)	Best Adapted Screenplay	Harry Cripps	Nominated
AACTA Awards (2001 AFI Awards)	Best Adapted Screenplay	Greg Haddrick	Nominated
AACTA Awards (2001 AFI Awards)	Best Adapted Screenplay	Simon Hopkinson	Nominated
AACTA Awards (2001 AFI Awards)	Best Sound	Julius Chan	Nominated
AACTA Awards (2001 AFI Awards)	Best Sound	Liam Egan	Nominated
AACTA Awards (2001 AFI Awards)	Best Sound	Dave Eggins	Nominated
AACTA Awards (2001 AFI Awards)	Best Sound	Les Fiddess	Nominated
AACTA Awards (2001 AFI Awards)	Best Sound	Phil Judd	Nominated
FCCA Award	Best Screenplay - Adapted	Harry Cripps	Nominated
FCCA Award	Best Screenplay - Adapted	Greg Haddrick	Nominated
FCCA Award	Best Screenplay - Adapted	Simon Hopkinson	Nominated

== Soundtrack ==
A soundtrack, recorded by the Marionette Theatre of Australia, was released on 14 July 2001.

No.	Title	Performer(s)	Length
1.	"It's a Wonderful Day"	Geoffrey Rush	1:25
2.	"Albert, The Magic Pudding"	John Cleese, Sam Neill, Geoffrey Rush, Hugo Weaving, Dave Gibson, Greg Carroll and Chorus	2:42
3.	"If I Had You"	Kate Ceberano	4:23
4.	"I Want You Back"	NSYNC	3:22
5.	"The Puddin' Owner's Song"	Sam Neill, Geoffrey Rush and Hugo Weaving	2:32
6.	"My Heart Beats"	Toni Collette	2:16
7.	"Flying Without Wings"	Westlife	3:36
8.	"Sister"	Sister2Sister	3:25
9.	"It's Worse Than Weevils"	Sam Neill, Geoffrey Rush and Hugo Weaving	0:38
10.	"Save the Town"	Sam Neill, Geoffrey Rush and Hugo Weaving	1:51
11.	"Eternal Flame"	Human Nature	3:20
12.	"In the Underground Tonight"	Jack Thompson, Mary Coustas, Dave Gibson and Chorus	1:47
13.	"Friends"	Merril Bainbridge	4:24
14.	"The Magic Pudding"	Rolf Harris	3:07
15.	"Now I Can Dance"	Tina Arena	5:55
16.	"A Slice of Pudding"	The Magic Pudding Orchestra	5:37
Total length:			50:20

== Video games ==
- The Magic Pudding Adventure - The same month when the movie was released, an interactive game called "The Magic Pudding Adventure" was released with video highlights from the movie and 5 re-playable activities including Sink or Swim also released on DVD.
