= Poker Face (2022 film) =

2022 American film by Russell Crowe

- Film poster
- Directed by: Russell Crowe
- Screenplay by: Russell Crowe
- Story by: Stephen M. Coates
- Based on: Original script by Stephen M. Coates
- Produced by: Mark B. David; Matt Williams; Jason Clark; Jeanette Volturno; Ryan Hamilton; Ying Ye; Addam Bramich; Keith Rodger; Gary Hamilton
- Starring: Russell Crowe; Liam Hemsworth; RZA; Aden Young; Steve Bastoni; Daniel MacPherson
- Cinematography: Aaron McLisky
- Edited by: Scott Gray; Matthew Woolley
- Music by: Matteo Zingales; Antony Partos
- Production companies: Sky; Stan; MEP Capital; Alceon Entertainment Partners
- Distributed by: Screen Media
- Release dates: November 16, 2022 (Limited theater release); November 22, 2022 (On demand)
- Running time: 95 minutes
- Countries: Australia; United States
- Language: English
- Box office: $2.6 million

Poker Face is a 2022 thriller film written by, directed by and starring Russell Crowe. It co-stars Liam Hemsworth and RZA. The film had a limited theatrical release on November 16, 2022 and was released on demand on November 22, 2022.

== Plot ==
Jake Foley, a tech billionaire, holds a high-stakes poker night with his childhood friends. As the night goes on, it is revealed Foley wants his friends to expose secrets they have held their entire lives. Mikey reveals that his life is miserable and that he brought a gun with which he plans to shoot himself. Alex reveals that he has been sleeping with Jake's wife. Paul reveals that he has been having money problems and has given his brother, Victor, information about Jake's life to settle his debt. Things go awry as Victor tries to rob Jake's house's art, his family arrives unexpectedly, and the friends must band together to survive. Jake eventually tells Victor he has drunk poison in a wine glass from which he drank. Victor, unaware that the dose he drank was not enough to be lethal, succumbs to Jake's ploy to feed him a lethal dose of the poison when Jake tells him he has an antidote.

== Cast ==
- Russell Crowe as Jake Foley
- Liam Hemsworth as Michael Nankervis
- RZA as Andrew Johnson
- Brooke Satchwell as Nicole Foley
- Aden Young as Alex Harris
- Steve Bastoni as Paul Muccino
- Daniel MacPherson as Sam McIntyre
- Paul Tassone as Victor
- Elsa Pataky as Penelope
- Jack Thompson as Shaman Bill (Paje)
- Matt Nable as Billy
- Benedict Hardie as Styx
- Jacqueline McKenzie as Doctor
- Molly Grace as Rebecca Foley

== Release ==
The film had a limited theatrical release in international markets on November 16, 2022 and was released on VOD in the United States and Canada by Screen Media on November 22, 2022.

== Reception ==
=== Box office ===
Poker Face grossed $2.6 million at the box office during its limited theatrical release in international markets.

=== Critical response ===
On the review aggregator website Rotten Tomatoes, 9% of 34 critics' reviews are positive, with an average rating of 4.2/10. The website's consensus reads: "As Kenny Rogers told us, you've got to know when to fold 'em – a warning Russell Crowe should have heeded when he got the script for Poker Face." Metacritic, which uses a weighted average, assigned the film a score of 43 out of 100, based on 10 critics, indicating "mixed or average" reviews.

Common Sense Media rated the film 3 out of 5 stars, while Glenn Kenny of RogerEbert.com gave it 2 stars, saying, "Even if you can sense the fun Crowe is having with the camera setups in certain scenes, 'Poker Face' is simultaneously a lot and not all that much."
