= Mesokampos, Florina =

Mesokampos Μεσόκαμπος
- Community
- Location within Greece
- Coordinates: 40°53′40″N 21°30′48″E
- Country: Greece
- Geographic region: Macedonia
- Administrative region: Western Macedonia
- Regional unit: Florina
- Municipality: Florina
- Municipal unit: Kato Kleines

Population (2021)
  - Community: 60
- Time zone: UTC+2 (EET)
  - Summer (DST): UTC+3 (EEST)

Mesokampos (Greek: Μεσόκαμπος, before 1926: Ορτά Ομπά – Orta Oba) is a village in Florina Regional Unit, Macedonia, Greece.

The 1920 Greek census recorded 165 people in the village, and 165 inhabitants (33 families) were Muslim in 1923. Following the Greek–Turkish population exchange, Greek refugee families in Orta Ompa were from East Thrace (1) and Asia Minor (8) in 1926. The 1928 Greek census recorded 179 village inhabitants. In 1928, the refugee families numbered 35 (181 people).
