= Popcorn (play) =

Play by Ben Elton

- Original Nottingham Playhouse production window card, 1996
- Written by: Ben Elton
- Original language: English
- Subject: Killers determined to use movie director's art as justification for murder
- Genre: Comedy
- Setting: Los Angeles, California

Premiere
- Date premiered: 1996
- Place premiered: Nottingham Playhouse; Nottingham, England

Popcorn is a 1998 play by English author Ben Elton adapted from his novel of the same title.
