= Effie: Just Quietly =

Australian television series

Effie: Just quietly Vol. 2 DVD

Effie: Just Quietly was a satirical television series that aired on Australia's Special Broadcasting Service in 2001.

It featured the titular Effie, played by Mary Coustas. Effie is a suburban Greek Australian hair goddess, who navigates Australians' everyday attitudes and prejudices.

The series contains six half-hour episodes. It was produced by Robyn Kershaw and directed by Warren Coleman and Shawn Seet.

== See also ==
- List of Australian television series
