= The John Curtin Hotel =

Australian pub and music venue

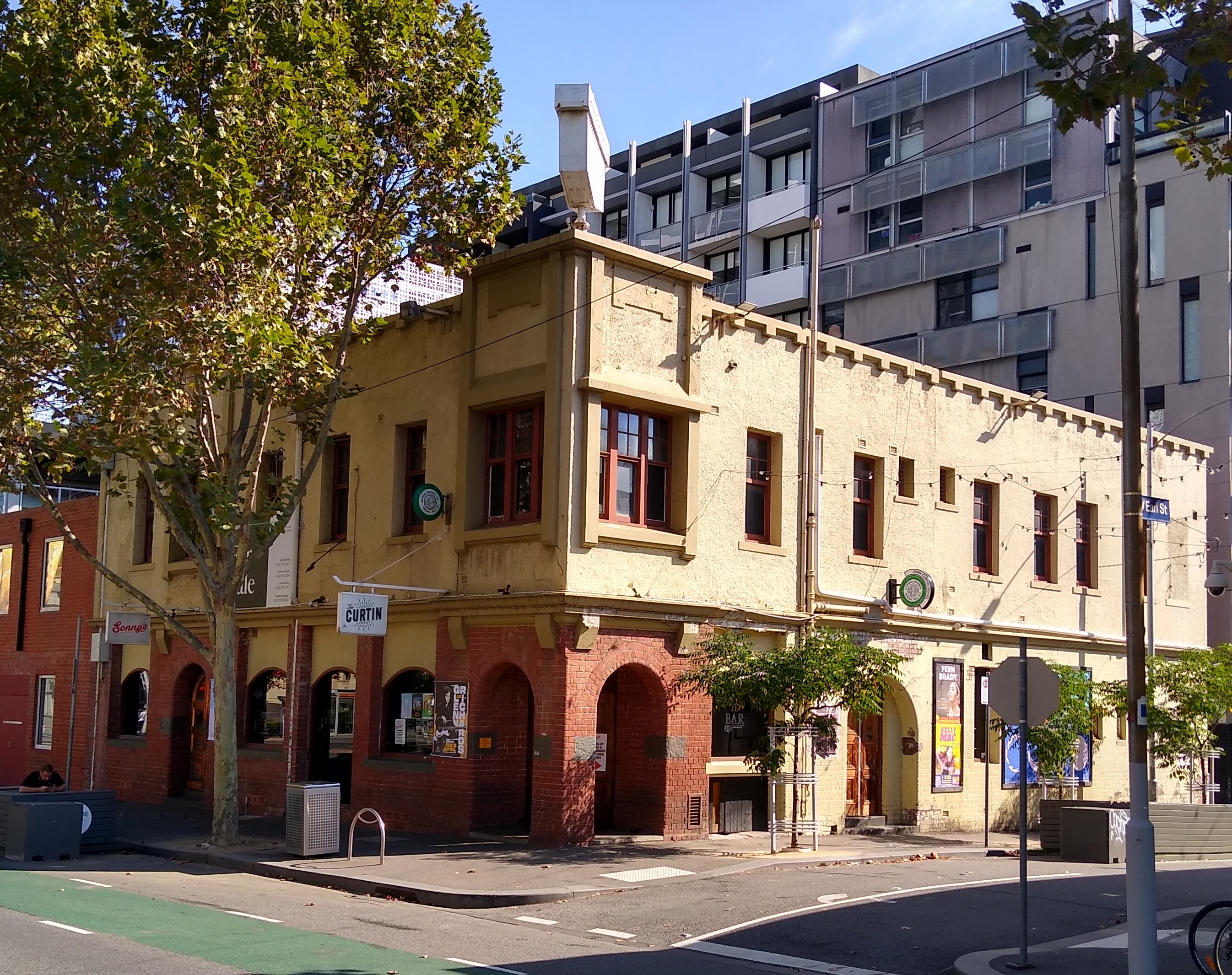
- The Curtin photographed in March 2022
- Interactive map of the The John Curtin Hotel area
- Former names: The Lygon Hotel
- Alternative names: The Curtin

General information
- Type: Music venue
- Location: Carlton, Victoria, 29 Lygon St, Carlton VIC 3053
- Coordinates: 37.806215°S 144.965774°E
- Opened: c1860

Victorian Heritage Register
- Official name: John Curtin Hotel
- Criteria: a., g.
- Designated: 6 April 2023

The John Curtin Hotel, better known as The Curtin, is a pub, bar, and live music venue located in Carlton, Victoria, Australia.

Founded c1860, the pub was first named The Lygon Hotel and was renamed The John Curtin Hotel in 1971 after Australia's 14th prime minister, John Curtin. It is known as a meeting place for the Labor party, and remained popular among members of the labour movement due to the Victorian Trades Hall building being across the road.

In 1975 the Australian Council of Trades Unions announced plans to buy the building for approximately $500,000 and redevelop it.

The venue was nominated in the Music Victoria Awards category for Best Venue (Under 500 Capacity) in 2016 and 2017.

The building features an upstairs 300 person capacity bandroom, and is currently home to Sonny's Fried Chicken and Burgers, serving American-style food.

In 2020, the pub's owner Ben Russell was forced to close the bandroom and cancel all upcoming gigs due to government restrictions around the COVID-19 pandemic. They continued to serve food and drinks, but he said business had suffered.

In February 2022 the pub's managers announced their lease would expire in November after the owner had decided to sell the building. Beat noted The Curtin's closure and uncertain future was part of an ongoing trend in Melbourne, with many live music venues forced to close.

Following the pub's announcement, unions once again discussed purchasing the building. The sale is being managed by commercial real estate agency CBRE.

The building was protected by the City of Melbourne’s heritage overlay so that it couldn't be demolished completely, but could be partially demolished, leaving the original façade and allowing new apartments to be built. In April 2023, the pub was listed on the Victorian Heritage Register.
