= Blowing Hot and Cold =

- Directed by: Marc Gracie
- Written by: Rosa Colosimo; Sergio Donati; Reg McLean; Luciano Vincenzoni
- Produced by: Rosa Colosimo
- Starring: Joe Dolce; Peter Adams
- Cinematography: James Grant
- Edited by: Nicolas Lee
- Music by: Joe Dolce
- Production companies: Chancom Limited; Colosimo Film Productions
- Distributed by: Filmtrust
- Release date: August 1989
- Running time: 85 mins
- Country: Australia
- Language: English

Blowing Hot and Cold is a 1989 Australian comedy-drama film directed by Marc Gracie and starring Joe Dolce and Peter Adams. The plot is about an Italian who befriends a garage owner whose daughter has run off with a drug dealer.

== Premise ==
Two people from Italy and Australia set their cultural differences aside to search for a girl who ran off with a drug dealer.

== Cast ==
- Peter Adams as Jack Phillips
- Joe Dolce as Nino Patrovita
- Kate Gorman as Sally Phillips
- Elspeth Ballantyne as Shellagh MacBean

== Production ==
It was originally announced the film would be made in 1984 starring Arkie Whiteley directed by Brian Trenchard-Smith.

The film was shot in Redesdale, Victoria, Kyneton, Diggers Rest, Victoria, Taradale, Victoria and Melbourne.
