= Simon Palomares =

Australian actor and comedian

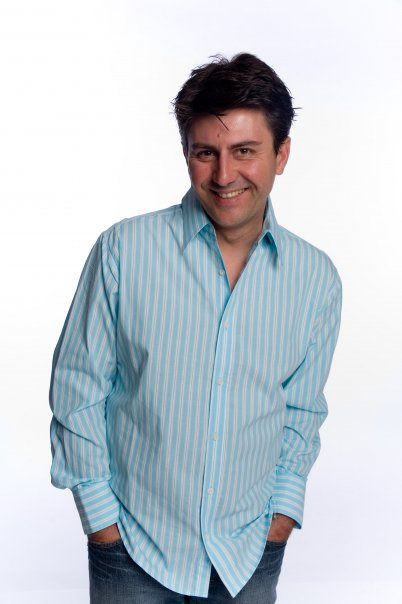
- Born: Düsseldorf, Germany
- Occupations: Actor and Comedian

Simon Palomares is a German-born Australian comedian and actor of Spanish descent. He is best known for his character as cafe manager Ricardo "Ricky" Martinez in Acropolis Now.

== Biography ==
Simon Palomares was born in Düsseldorf, Germany. His father almost emigrated with his young family to Canada, however while waiting at the Spanish emigration office, he bumped into a friend who advised him how cold the weather was in Canada and he then switched his decision and chose Australia as the place to emigrate to. Palomares studied drama and psychology at Deakin University (Rusden) and studied acting at the renowned Juan Carlos Corazza School in Madrid. Recently he completed a post-graduate degree in arts and entertainment management at Deakin University.

== Stand-up comedy and theatre ==
Palomares was one of the creators and stars of the Wogs Out of Work comedy stage show, which later evolved into the Acropolis Now TV series. He has performed comedy shows in the United States, Canada, Spain and Argentina where he performs stand-up in Spanish. More recently, Palomares has toured Australia in a combination cooking program and stand-up comedy show called Palomares Cooks Calamares.

Palomares has worked as a writer in Madrid, Spain, for Lo Mas Plus, a nightly review program on Canal+, and directed a flamenco version of Lorca's The House of Bernarda Alba at the Malthouse Theatre in Melbourne. He performed 2007–2011 with fellow comedians George Kapiniaris, Joe Avati and Jason Chong in a national tour of their show Il Dago. In July 2011 Palomares was invited to the Just For Laughs Comedy Festival in Montreal by Paramount Comedy (Spain) to record a Spanish comedy TV special for Canadian OMNI Channel. In 2011 he also produced a 13-episode series for C31 in Melbourne called Passion to Profession.

== Television and film ==
Most recently he has performed for the program Nuevos Comicos on Paramount Comedy (Spain) and completed a documentary called KO HO NAS (Cojones) for Special Broadcasting Service (SBS) shown in Australia on 11 November 2009. He wrote and directed a short film, The Usual, which was acclaimed at the St Kilda Film Festival.

In 2006, he created, co-hosted and commentated on The Foosy Show, a program where contestants play table football (foosball), with George Kapiniaris on Channel 31 in Melbourne. In addition to his acting credits, he appeared as himself in an episode of the ABC series Smallest Room in the House, a series in which stand-up comedians told true stories of their upbringing.

Palomares has directed episodes of Neighbours and was second unit director on Totally Full Frontal. He has also provided voices in the video games Rome: Total War (2004) and Rome: Total War - Barbarian Invasion (2005).

He worked on the series Romper Stomper Next Gen for Stan Television and the series Australian Gangster to be aired in 2021.

Latigo (Whip), an award-winning documentary about Cuban comedians was produced and directed by Palomares and was featured in the 2021 Spanish Film Festival around Australia.

== Filmography ==
- The Lighthorsemen (1987, film) as Turkish officer
- Acropolis Now (1989, TV series) as Ricardo "Ricky" Martinez
- Mission: Impossible (1989, TV series) as a sailor (episode "The Greek")
- Shooting Elizabeth (1992, film) as Carlos
- Snowy (1993, TV series) as Manolo
- Time Trax (1994, TV series) as Angelo (episode "The Gravity of It All")
- Snowy River: The McGregor Saga (1996, TV series) as Prince Alfredo Perez (episode "Prince of Hearts")
- Blue Heelers (1998, TV series) as Jeremy Phillips (episode "When Love Isn't Enough")
- Driven Crazy (1998, TV series) as Pierre (episodes "The Cat with No Name" & "The Moonies")
- The Games (1998, TV series) as Simon (episodes "Rural and Environment" & "Millennium Bug")
- La Spagnola (2001, film) as Ricardo
- Stingers (1998, 2001, TV series) as Terry Joseph (episode "Innocents Abroad") & Gino Londoni (episode "Closure")
- Signs of Life (2002 film) (2002 film)
- Stiff (2004, TV film) as Sam Rossi
- Il Dago
- Il Dago 2: Now With Noodles
- Big Mamma's Boy (2011) as Dr. Ricky Martinez
- Romper Stomper Next Gen (2017, TV series)
- Australian Gangster (2021, TV series)
