= SBS (Australian TV channel) =

National public television network in Australia

- Logo used since 2019
- Type: Free-to-air television network Public broadcaster
- Country: Australia
- Broadcast area: Nationwide
- Network: SBS Television
- Headquarters: 14 Herbert Street; Artarmon, New South Wales

Programming
- Language: English
- Picture format: 1080i HDTV (downscaled to 576i for the SDTV feed)

Ownership
- Owner: Special Broadcasting Service
- Sister channels: SBS HD; SBS2; SBS World Movies; SBS Food; NITV

History
- Launched: 24 October 1980; 46 years ago
- Former names: SBS Ethnic Television (April – July 1979); Experimental Multicultural Television – MTV2 (February – May 1980); Channel 0/28 (1980–1983); Network 0–28 (1983–1985); SBS TV (1985–2009); SBS ONE (1 June 2009 – 4 July 2015)

Links
- Website: sbs.com.au

Availability

Terrestrial
- STN Sydney (DVB-T): 1108 @ 7 (184.5 MHz)
- AGV Melbourne (DVB-T): 1124 @ 7 (184.5 MHz)
- VTQ Brisbane/Gold Coast (DVB-T): 1140 @ 7 (184.5 MHz)
- ATS Adelaide (DVB-T): 1156 @ 7 (184.5 MHz)
- WTW Perth/Mandurah (DVB-T): 1172 @ 7 (184.5 MHz)
- DVB-T: 7
- Freeview SBS (virtual): 3
- Freeview SBS HD (virtual): 30

The Special Broadcasting Service (SBS) is a public television network in Australia and part of the broader SBS television division. As of 2024, SBS had a 9.3% audience share, an increase from 8.5% in 2023.

SBS originally began airing full-time transmissions on 24 October 1980 under the name 'Channel 0/28'; broadcasting on UHF Channel 28 and VHF Channel 0 in Sydney and Melbourne. On 18 February 1985, the station was renamed SBS. By 27 June 1985, the station had expanded its service to Brisbane, Adelaide, Newcastle, and Wollongong. By 16 March 1986, the expansion had grown to include Perth, Canberra and Hobart.

As of 2025, SBS TV is the fifth-rated television network and primary channel in Australia, behind the Seven Network, Nine Network, ABC TV and Network 10.

== History ==
=== Origins ===
SBS began test transmissions in April 1979 under the name "SBS Ethnic Television", broadcasting foreign-language programs on ABV-2 Melbourne and ABN-2 Sydney on Sunday mornings. Full-time transmission commenced at 6:30 p.m. on 24 October 1980 (United Nations Day) as Channel 0/28. At the time, SBS broadcast on UHF Channel 28 and VHF Channel 0. Bruce Gyngell, who introduced television to Australia back in 1956, was tasked with launching the station's initial programming. The first program broadcast was a documentary on multiculturalism titled Who Are We?, hosted, produced, and directed by Australian journalist Peter Luck.

The opening broadcast included an announcement accompanied by Aaron Copland's Fanfare for the Common Man. Founder Bruce Gyngell stated that the network was intended to provide programming for ethnic communities as well as general Australian audiences. A 1981 study indicated that Channel 0/28 was watched by a significant portion of Sydney viewers; the data showed that approximately 98% of people within surveyed ethnic groups watched programming in their respective languages. Gyngell left SBS in late 1982 (later joining TV-am in the United Kingdom in 1984), after which the network began to rely more heavily on repeating programming.

=== 1980s to the 1990s ===
On 14 October 1983, the service expanded to Canberra on UHF28, as well as Cooma and Goulburn on UHF58, at the same time changing its name to Network 0–28. It also introduced a new slogan: "Bringing the World Back Home". To mark the expansion, the channel aired a message from the prime minister, as well as a documentary on UHF tuning.

On 18 February 1985, the station was renamed to SBS and began daytime programming from 11 a.m. to 2 p.m., while the start time of the evening transmissions was moved to 5:30 p.m. In June of the same year, SBS expanded to Brisbane, Adelaide, Newcastle, Wollongong, and the Gold Coast. On 5 January 1986, SBS ceased broadcasting on the VHF0 frequency. Although many Australians at the time did not have UHF antennas, SBS's VHF licence had already been extended for one year, and not all antennas were compatible with the channel's low-frequency broadcasting either. Following this, on 16 March 1986, SBS commenced transmission in Perth and Hobart. Darwin was the last capital city to receive SBS, with a local signal launched on 20 May 1994, and Shepparton was the last city to launch the channel in November 2001.

Although SBS Television commenced transmissions as a non-commercial television network, in 1991, the network began broadcasting advertisements between programs.

=== 2000s ===
In 2001, digital terrestrial television was introduced with transmissions available to most of SBS Television's coverage area on 1 January 2001. This was soon followed by the gradual introduction of widescreen programming.

The hosts of The Movie Show, David Stratton and Margaret Pomeranz, moved to the ABC in April 2004 to host a new program called At the Movies. The Movie Show continued with four new hosts, which included Megan Spencer, Jaimie Leonarder, Fenella Kernebone, and Marc Fennell. The final episode of The Movie Show aired in June 2006, after the show was cancelled. The same month, SBS announced it would start showing advertisements during programs, unlike the previous practice in which advertisements were only shown in between programs. In May 2007, The Movie Show returned with a new interactive ten-minute format, presented by Lisa Hensley and Michael Adams.

On 1 June 2009, SBS TV was renamed SBS One to coincide with the launch of its new sister channel SBS Two (now SBS 2), which would offer programming geared towards younger audiences.

=== 2010s ===
On 10 December 2013, SBS ceased analogue television broadcasts and is now only available through digital TV or a digital set-top box.

On 27 March 2014, SBS and SBS Two stopped broadcasting Weatherwatch Overnight, an overnight filler program providing national and international weather information with live video feeds of various cities around the world provided by EarthTV. Subsequently, both channels now broadcast 24/7. On 4 July 2015, SBS One changed its name back to SBS TV.

SBS launched a new channel focusing on both local and international food programming on 17 November 2015. The channel, called SBS Food (formerly Food Network due to the partnership with Discovery Inc.), is available on free-to-air channel 33.

On 15 November 2016, SBS rebranded its sister station SBS 2 to SBS 2 with content from US-Canadian broadcaster Vice Media after signing a deal with Vice Media on 23 June 2016.

Since February 2019, SBS rebranded with a minor logo refresh, with the same original 2008 and 2015 logo modified by slightly downsizing the mercator with the wordmark slightly growing and introducing a new slogan, "A world of difference."

On 1 July 2019, SBS World Movies began broadcasting on Channel 32. This replaced the standard-definition broadcast of SBS 2, which moved to Channel 31 in high-definition. With this launch, SBS World Movies became the network's fourth multichannel, alongside SBS, SBS 2, and SBS Food.

=== 2020s ===
On 23 May 2022, SBS launched a new multichannel, SBS WorldWatch, which would feature all previously aired non-English news bulletins from the World Watch programming block alongside their own locally produced bulletins in both Arabic and Mandarin. It is available on free-to-air channel 35.

Leading up to the 2022 FIFA World Cup, SBS spent $20 million to acquire the exclusive rights to broadcast the competition. SBS also retained the broadcasting rights for the 2026 tournament.

In 2025, SBS celebrated 50 years as Australia's second public broadcaster, marking the time from the first test radio broadcasts in 1975.

After using the SBS 2 name since 2016, SBS's second channel will revert to the original SBS 2 branding in 2026.

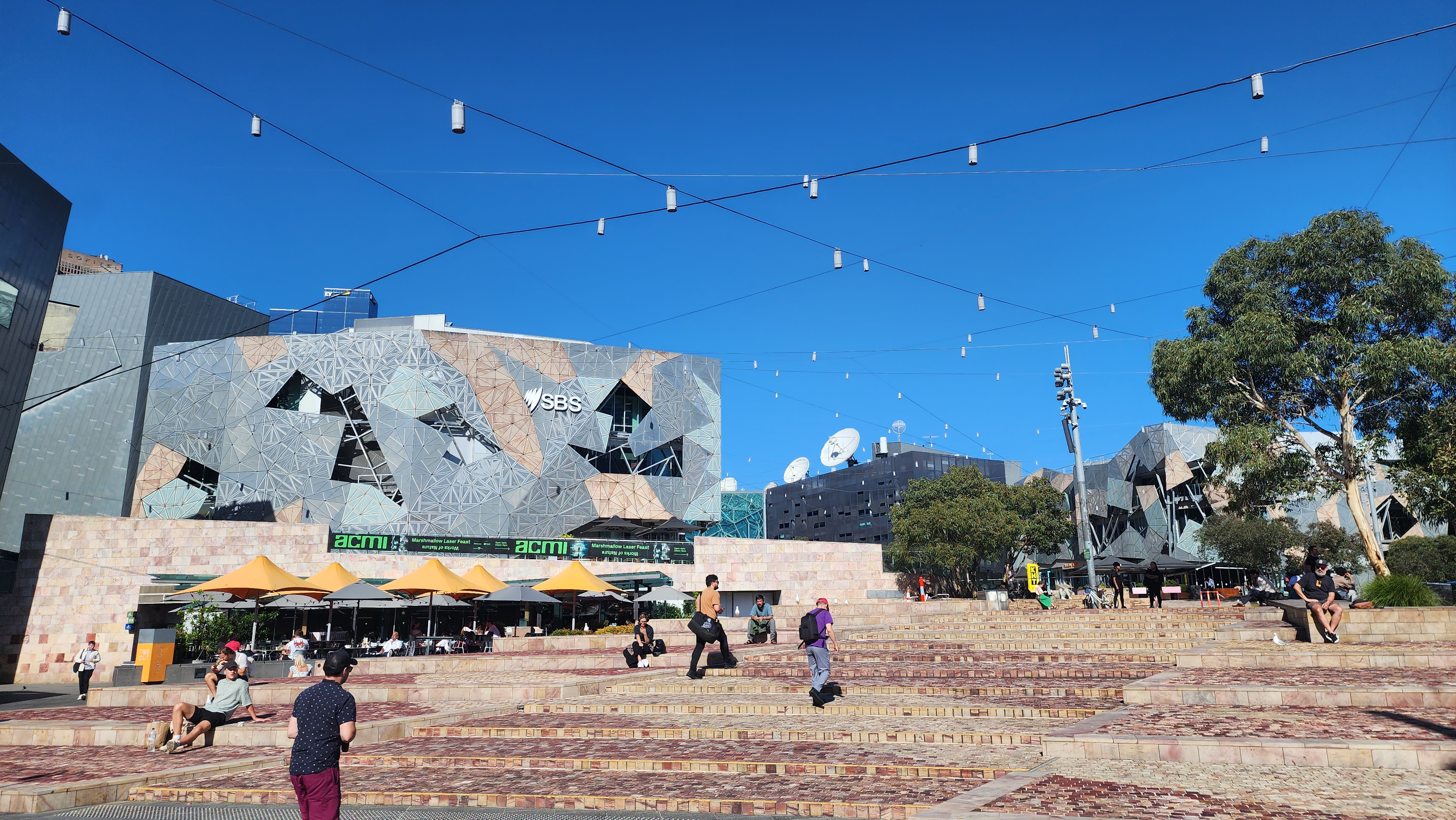
SBS building in Federation Square

== Programming ==
SBS is required by charter to meet certain programming obligations. Although it maintains a focus on international news and current affairs, it also presents documentaries, drama, comedy, films, and sport.

SBS centers its morning schedule on news bulletins in languages other than English. Outside of its news bulletins, SBS broadcasts a selection of subtitled, foreign-language films and documentaries, alongside a sports portfolio centered on international events such as the FIFA World Cup and the Tour de France.

SBS's drama line-up mostly consists of imported content. International productions shown include Inspector Rex, Unit One, Funland, Shameless, Medici, and ZeroZeroZero. Recent locally produced programs have included Kick, or East West 101.

Comedy on SBS has included locally produced shows, such as the SBS Monday comedy slot, but also foreign series such as The Ricky Gervais Show, Skins, Bro'Town, South Park (until 2020), Corner Gas, Nighty Night, and Queer as Folk. The channel has presented comedy shows, which include Pizza, Newstopia, Life Support, John Safran, Swift and Shift Couriers, Bogan Pride, in addition to reality television series, Nerds FC, and Song for the Socceroos. As well as this, anime from Japan also aired on SBS, with programs including Neon Genesis Evangelion, Samurai Champloo (as well as shows like Bubblegum Crisis Tokyo 2040 and Bleach in the past), and the Studio Ghibli movies, as well as several cult movies. Dadı, the Turkish version of the American sitcom The Nanny, was shown on SBS, as were numerous sitcoms, soap operas, drama series, and movies in languages other than English, including Mexican and Brazilian telenovelas and Bollywood movies. Such programming is subtitled in English (such subtitling is typically applied by SBS itself via its in-house subtitling department).

The rest of the schedule includes English-language lifestyle, music, game, and talk shows. This selection includes foreign language film programs like SBS Film, which broadcasts international cinema, also featured on the World Movies Channel. Late at night, when there is no scheduled programming, SBS usually broadcasts a Weatherwatch program, which shows a weather map of Australia. In late 2005, the program was updated to feature weather information from cities around the world, along with a short clip of selected cities.

Since the late 1980s, SBS has screened the 1960s German-made comedy sketch Dinner for One every New Year's Eve, emulating an annual European TV tradition.

Between 1989 and 2006, the narrator for SBS was Robbie McGregor. The current narrator is Lani John Tupu.

=== News and current affairs ===
SBS has a range of news and current affairs programming, including its nightly, national news service SBS World News, investigative programme Dateline, discussion forum Insight, indigenous affairs program Living Black, in addition to its morning & afternoon World Watch time slot, featuring bulletins in languages other than English. Until early 2007, Toyota World Sport was shown on weeknights until it was axed to accommodate the relaunched, one-hour World News Australia (which is now SBS World News) and World Watch.

It also broadcasts foreign-language news on its second digital channel, SBS 2. Sometimes it provides additional information, highlights, and statistics for programmes shown on SBS, such as the FIFA World Cup, The Ashes, Olympic Games, and the Australian Football League Grand Final.

SBS, along with its sister channel SBS 2, is still airing English news bulletins from international news channels under the current World Watch block following the launch of SBS WorldWatch multilingual channel.

=== Sport ===
SBS Sport currently holds the broadcast rights to several sports events, which are broadcast on SBS, SBS 2, and SBS On Demand. They have held the rights to many sporting events over the years, which have included the Tour de France, the World Superbikes, the World Rally Championship, The Ashes, UEFA Champions League, UEFA Cup, FIFA World Cup (every tournament since 1986; shared 2002 tournament with the Nine Network, 2018 with Optus Sport), FIFA Confederations Cup, the FA Cup, the UEFA European Football Championship, the 2004 Summer Olympics, the American National Football League's Super Bowl and the English Premier League. SBS has also produced and broadcast a range of sport-related programming, including The World Game and the UEFA Champions League Magazine.

The telecast of the 2008 Summer Olympics in Beijing was shared by both the Seven Network and SBS, with the Seven Network holding exclusive Australian free-to-air, pay television, online, and mobile telephony broadcast rights. SBS provided additional coverage and focused on long-form events such as football, road bicycle racing, volleyball, and table tennis. In contrast, Seven broadcast the opening and closing ceremonies and mainstream sports, including swimming, athletics, rowing, cycling, and gymnastics.

== Funding ==
Approximately 80% of SBS's funding comes from the Australian Federal Government. The rest comes from independent sources, including "advertising and sponsorship, production services and sale of programs and merchandise". In the financial year of 2018–2019, the broadcaster is slated to receive $272.4 million.

== Availability ==
SBS is available on all of SBS Television's television transmitters in SD Digital. The channel's scheduling differs from state to state only during major sporting events, when the transmission times of other programs may be altered. During the digital changeover between 2010 and 2013, SBS was also simulcast on Analogue.

In 2010, SBS commenced trial broadcasts of the FIFA World Cup in 3D on Channel 40.

=== SBS HD ===
SBS HD Logo

The SBS HD multichannel was launched on 14 December 2006. It broadcasts identical programming to SBS, but in 1080i HD via Freeview and Optus D1.

On 8 April 2017, alongside the launch of SBS 2 HD, SBS HD was upgraded to an MPEG-4 format, replacing the standard MPEG-2 format it had used since its inception.

=== SBS On Demand ===
SBS On Demand is a video-on-demand and catch-up TV service run by the Special Broadcasting Service. The service became available on 1 September 2011.

SBS On Demand is available on the web and via apps for mobile devices, smart TVs, and set-top boxes.

== Logo and identity history ==
The first SBS logo was a globe with a blue and white gradient surrounded by a blue and white gradient ring. The logo was used across all of SBS's radio and television stations and symbolised transmission on VHF channel 0. On 14 October 1983, Channel 0/28 was renamed Network 0–28, coinciding with a new logo featuring the new name underneath the globe. On 18 February 1985, Network 0–28 was renamed SBS TV, coinciding with a new logo featuring the letters SBS underneath the globe. In 1989, the logo was again updated with the globe removed.

A new SBS logo was launched in March 1993, featuring five blue curved splices, described as the "Mercator" logo (named as the shapes look like a Mercator globe in 2D), with the letters SBS in white on top. Between 1995 and 2003, station identifications typically featured the Mercator logo without the "SBS" text. The five splices represented the continents of the world, and the angle represented the tilt of the Earth's axis.

The new logo and a rebranding were launched on 7 May 2008, reducing the number of splices to four and shifting the perspective and angle so that each splice is larger than the last. The logo was modified on 1 June 2009, to coincide with the renaming of the channel to "SBS ONE".

On 4 July 2015, SBS launched a modified version of its 2008 logo when its main channel changed its name back to 'SBS TV'. The "SBS ONE" name is still used on electronic program guides.

On 8 February 2019, SBS's new slogan, A World of Difference, was revealed. The channel rebranded with the slogan the following day, in time for Eurovision – Australia Decides.

24 October 1980 – 14 October 1983

14 October 1983 – 18 February 1985

18 February 1985 – 1989

1989 – March 1993

March 1993 – 7 May 2008

7 May 2008 – 31 May 2009

1 June 2009 – 3 July 2015

4 July 2015 – 8 February 2019

8 February 2019 – present

=== Identity history ===
- 29 April – 22 July 1979: This is SBS, Ethnic Television. (used for SBS TV's test transmissions)
- 10 February – 14 May 1980: A Whole New Look at Television.
- 24 October 1980 – 14 October 1983: Channel 0 – A Whole World of People/Entertainment.
- January 1982: Channel 0/28, Celebrating Australia Week 1982.
- 14 October 1983 – 18 February 1985: Network 0–28 – Bringing the World Back Home.
- 18 February 1985 – 1986: We're SBS – Bringing the World Back Home.
- 1986–1988: Discover the Difference.
- 1989–1996: Bringing the World Back Home.
- 1998–2004: Your World is an Amazing Place
- 2005–2006: Nobody Sees the World Like SBS
- 2006–2008: There's More to Summer on SBS.
- 7 May 2008 – 27 October 2011: Six Billion Stories and Counting.
- 28 October 2011 – 13 June 2014: Seven Billion Stories and Counting.
- 14 June 2014 – 3 July 2015: Join In
- 8 February 2019 – present: A World of Difference
- April 2025 – present: We Go There

== See also ==
- List of digital television channels in Australia
