= Sleek =

Sleek is an adjective referring to shine and slenderness

Sleek may also refer to:

- A 'sleek', or hairline scratch on sheet glass
- Sleek Spur, coastal spur in Antarctica
- Sleek (Dungeons & Dragons)

== See also ==
- Sleek the Elite, pseudonym for rapper Paul Nakad
