= John Boxer =

John Boxer may refer to:

- John Boxer (Australian actor) (born 1959)
- John Boxer (British actor) (1909–1982)
