= The Plex =

- Directed by: Tim Boyle
- Written by: Tim Boyle
- Produced by: Tim Boyle; Brian Cobb
- Starring: Matt Doran; Jason Crewes; Samantha Turner
- Cinematography: Casimir Dickson
- Release date: 4 September 2008
- Running time: 95 minutes
- Country: Australia
- Language: English

The Plex is a 2008 Australian film directed by Tim Boyle and starring Matt Doran, Jason Crewes and Samantha Turner. The film premiered on 4 September 2008.

== Synopsis ==
AJ lives an unsatisfactory life as an usher at the local Multiplex cinema working alongside his best friend Zeke and his sexy, but power hungry girlfriend Katie. After AJ is unfairly fired he decides to get even with his old boss.

== Cast ==
- Laura Andersen as Betty Parker
- Steve Bastoni as The Baron / Mad Morgan Edwards
- John Boxer as Angus Vasnar
- Gerard Boyle as Single Guy
- Tim Boyle as A.D.D. Dave
- Andrew Caryofyllis as Allan Smithee
- Peter Chapman as Change Guy
- Brian Cobb as Hollywood Sam
- Michael Cotton-Stapleton as Sebastian
- Jason Crewes as Zeke Edwards
- Leo Domigan as Frank Stone
- Matt Doran as AJ Stone
- Gabriel Egan as Blinger
- Adam Gelin as Donations Man
- Salme Geransar as Misty
- Simon T. Gleeson as Stefan
- Shaun Angus Hall as Sci Fi Movie Freak
- Tori Hartigan as Bec
- Stella Ha Vi Do as Japanese Woman
- Damion Hunter as Mac
- Mark Jensen as Mr. Carbonie
- John Schwarz as Vincent Vasnar
- Tai Scrivener as Keith
- Yvonne Strahovski as Sarah
- Samantha Turner as Kat
- Alys Daroy as Voice of Sarah (Yvonne Strahovski)
