= John Mangos =

Australian news presenter (born 1956)

- Born: 9 July 1956 (age 70); Melbourne, Victoria, Australia
- Education: Journalism RMIT
- Occupations: Journalist, television host
- Years active: 1978−present
- Known for: National Nine News (Nine Network, Melbourne 1978-1992); Coast to Coast with Graham Kennedy; Eyewitness News (Network Ten); The Midday Show (Nine Network as reporter; At Home with John Mangoes
- Spouse: Tanny
- Children: Kosta and Apollo

John Mangos (born 9 July 1956) is an Australian journalist, television news presenter, reporter and media personality of Greek descent.

Mangos has previously been a journalist he was worked at both the Nine Network and Network Ten, and as a news presenter on Sky News Australia. He has made cameo appearances on the Australian comedy programs Pizza, Swift and Shift Couriers and Housos.

== Career ==
=== Journalism and television ===
Mangos began his career as a journalist for National Nine News in 1978 at the GTV 9 newsroom in Melbourne. He was hired by legendary News Director John Sorrell who wanted to make Mangos the first Greek-Australian face on mainstream commercial television. During his 14 years with the Nine Network he covered State and Federal Politics before becoming the United States correspondent. In 1989, he joined Graham Kennedy on his late night news and current affairs program Coast to Coast, replacing Ken Sutcliffe.

Mangos has also been a news presenter for Eyewitness News on the Ten Network, an international reporter for the Nine Network's The Midday Show and the host of his own daytime chat show At Home with John Mangos on the Seven Network for two years.

In 2008, he became a contestant on It Takes Two, a variety show that teams celebrities with professional singers, who each week compete against each other in a sing-off to impress a panel of judges and ultimately the viewing public in order to survive potential elimination.

In June 2011, John Mangos' contract with Sky News was not renewed following controversial comments he made on the Paul Murray Live program. The comments led to a complaint to the Human Rights Commission.

In September 2011, Mangos filled in for Lee Lin Chin on SBS World News for one month.

In December 2011, Mangos joined the Seven Network as a fill in news presenter on Seven Morning News and Seven 4.30 News. He also regularly appeared on Sunrise and The Morning Show.

=== Other ===
Mangos lives in Sydney, where he runs his own media consultancy, Megisti Media, which was named after the Greek island of his family's origin, Kastellorizo. He is also Director of Media for international financial corporate relations firm FTI. He currently works for Senator Aileen Macdonald.

== Personal life ==
Mangos is married to Tanny Mangos. They have two sons, Kosta and Apollo Mangos.
