= Alex Romano =

Australian-Argentinian actor

- Born: 27 July 1979 (age 47); Buenos Aires, Argentina
- Occupations: Film & TV Actor
- Years active: 2005–present

Alex Romano (born 27 July 1979) is an Argentine-Australian actor. He has starred in Paul Fenech's TV series; as DJ BJ (Big Jams) in Pizza, "Alex" in Swift and Shift Couriers, and "Jimmy the Junkie" in Housos.

== Career ==
Alex Romano made his debut in the Pizza TV series playing the character of DJBJ (DJ Big Jams), the delivery trainee being paid 50 cents a day. He first appeared in 2005 episode "New Shop Pizza", the premiere of season 4. In the 2008 series Swift and Shift Couriers, he played the role of Alex in the dispatch room. In 2014 he made a cameo appearance on 7mate's Bogan Hunters.

Romano has appeared as the character "Jimmy the Junkie" in the Housos TV series, and the two related movies, Housos vs. Authority and Fat Pizza vs. Housos, also making an appearance on the 2016 Fat Pizza vs. Housos: Live DVD.

He featured on Australian rapper Fortay at Large's YouTube television show The Fortnightly Report in the episode "Sunnyvale Junkies".

He appeared in the Dumb Criminals (2015) film, playing the character of Jimmy the junkie. In 2019, he was an actor in the indie film Benefited.
