= Elle Dawe =

Australian actress, comedian and model

Ellen (Elle) Dawe
- Born: 16 February 1981 (age 45); Sydney, New South Wales, Australia
- Occupations: Actress, model
- Years active: 1997–present

Ellen (Elle) Dawe (born 16 February 1981) is an Australian film and television actress, comedian and model.

== Acting ==
Ellen Dawe studied acting while attending Newtown High School of the Performing Arts in her younger years.

Her first major role on Australian television was in the 2008 SBS series Swift and Shift Couriers, portraying Elle Whick. Following this, she portrayed the popular character Shazza Jones, in Housos (SBS/7mate), Fat Pizza: Back in Business (7mate), Bogan Hunters (7mate) and in the feature films Housos vs. Authority (2012) and Fat Pizza vs. Housos (2014). She has hosted The Circle on Ten and has been featured on Seven's Sunrise and The Morning Show.

Dawe has also appeared in television commercials for Franklins and Tourism New Zealand.

== Other ==
Dawe has performed stand up comedy at the Adelaide Fringe Festival and the Sydney Comedy Festival, and has appeared on the cover and in a pictorial of the 7 November 2011 edition of Zoo Weekly Australia. She subsequently appeared in a second pictorial for the 28 January 2013 special "Australia Day" edition of the magazine.

== Filmography ==
=== Film ===
Year	Title	Role	Notes
2012	Housos vs. Authority	Shazza Jones	
2014	Fat Pizza vs. Housos	Shazza Jones	
2015	Dumb Criminals: The Movie	Sharnelle	
2021	24 Hours	Cassandra Bryant	
2023	Surviving Sunset an Actor's Hollywood Journey	Self	

=== Television ===
Year	Title	Role	Notes
2008–2011	Swift & Shift Couriers	Elle Whick	18 episodes
2011–2013; 2020–2022	Housos	Shazza Jones	23 episodes
2014	Bogan Hunters	Shazza	10 episodes
2019–2021	Fat Pizza: Back in Business	Shazza Jones	4 episodes

=== Video games ===
Year	Title	Role	Notes	Ref.
2014	Borderlands: The Pre-Sequel!	Annie Swan / Boganella / Comm Console / Sheila / Art-Appreciating Concordian	Voice	
