= Anthony Salame =

- Occupations: Comedian, actor, radio host
- Website: anthonysalame.com.au

Anthony Salame is an Australian comedian and radio host, who has also had appearances in multiple Australian television series.

== Early life ==
Anthony is the son of Lebanese migrants. He grew up in Sydney, Australia.

== Career ==
=== Radio ===
Anthony was a co-host of the Virgin Radio morning show in Beirut, Lebanon, starting from its launch in May 2013 and departing on 17 May 2019. He was embraced by the radio station due to his previous comedy experience in Australia.

=== Television ===
- Pizza (2007) as Omar
- Swift and Shift Couriers (2008–11) as Anthony Sukor
- Housos (2011) as Service Station Clerk and Crystal's boyfriend/Manager at the local McDonald's
- Legally Brown (2013) as Aziz
- The Footy Show (2013) – season 20, episode 6
- Koala Man (2023), as Sparky, Bricky and Yellow Tiggly

=== Stand-up Comedy ===
- Opened for LL Cool J at the Enmore Theatre (2009)
- Montreal Just for Laughs (Invitation Only) Comedy Festival (2009)
- Toured in the United States, Australia and New Zealand with Pablo Francisco, Jo Koy and Maz Jobrani (2010)
- Opened for De La Soul at the OMG Comedy Tour with Tahir & Hung Le (2011)
- Solo Tour to Lebanon with Live in Beirut (2011)
- Produced Anthony Salame: Is This Thing On?, stand-up comedy DVD released on 1 March 2012

== Awards and nominations ==
=== ARIA Music Awards ===
The ARIA Music Awards are a set of annual ceremonies presented by Australian Recording Industry Association (ARIA), which recognise excellence, innovation, and achievement across all genres of the music of Australia. They commenced in 1987.

Year	Nominee / work	Award	Result	Ref.
2012	Is This thing On?	Best Comedy Release	Nominated	
