= Pizza (TV series) =

Australian comedy television series

- Also known as: Fat Pizza: Back in Business (Season 6 – present)
- Genre: Black comedy Off-color humor Slapstick; Adventure; Sitcom
- Created by: Paul Fenech
- Developed by: Paul Fenech; Dave Webster
- Starring: Paul Fenech; Paul Nakad; John Boxer; Tahir Bilgiç; Jason "Jabba" Davis; Maria Venuti; George Kapiniaris
- Narrated by: Paul Fenech
- Opening theme: "That's Amore" by Dean Martin (Seasons 1–4) "Subwoofa (in Him) MkII" by Kz5 (Season 6 – present)
- Country of origin: Australia
- Original language: English
- No. of seasons: 7
- No. of episodes: 56

Production
- Executive producer: Paul Fenech
- Producer: Tanith Carroll
- Production locations: Lane Cove, NSW (season 1); Chullora, NSW (seasons 2–3); Greenacre, NSW (seasons 2–3); Fairfield Heights, NSW (season 4); St Johns Park, NSW (season 5); Old Toongabbie, NSW (seasons 6–7); Toongabbie, NSW (seasons 6–7)
- Running time: 25–50 minutes approx.
- Production company: Seven Studios (2019–2021)

Original release
- Network: SBS
- Release: 24 April 2000 – 10 December 2007
- Network: 7mate
- Release: 5 November 2019 – 20 October 2021

Related
- Fat Pizza (film); Fat Pizza vs. Housos; Swift and Shift Couriers; Housos; Darradong Local Council

Fat Pizza (simply known as Pizza, titled Fat Pizza: Back in Business from season six onwards) is an Australian comedy television series created by Paul Fenech.

The series premiered on SBS on 24 April 2000 where it aired for its first five seasons between 2000 and 2007 before moving to 7mate for its sixth and seventh seasons, in 2019 and 2021, respectively. The series has a spin-off feature length film, Fat Pizza, released in 2003, and a best-of highlights video and DVD that featured previously unreleased footage and a schoolies exposé, released in 2004. In addition to this, a theatre show entitled "Fat Pizza", starring several characters from the show, toured the Australian east coast. In 2014, the storyline of the series was combined with that of Housos to create the motion picture Fat Pizza vs. Housos. The film was shown in Australian cinemas from 27 November 2014.

Through some ironic and self-conscious references, Pizza involves themes of ethnicity and stereotypes (similar to Acropolis Now), cars, sex, illicit drugs and violence to produce its dark humour. The television program is noted for its frequent cameo appearances of numerous Australian celebrities of all varieties, including actors, comedians, professional athletes and other public figures.

== History and development ==
Pizza began in the early 1990s as a black-and-white short film entitled Pizza Man created by Paul Fenech, in which he starred as the eponymous pizza man. In 1995, the short film won third place in the Tropfest film festival.

The subsequent television series Pizza was written and directed by Paul Fenech, who portrays the protagonist of the series, pizza deliveryman Pauly. In a few of the episodes, Pauly breaks the fourth wall and as Paul Fenech, the self-described "fil-um maker",^{[sic]} presents featurettes that reveal the history of the series, often in a tongue-in-cheek or parody manner. It was first broadcast on the SBS network in 2000 until the fifth season in 2007. The half-hour program was part of the SBS Monday comedy slot, noted for its offbeat comedy shows including South Park and John Safran.

The Fat Pizza feature film was released in 2003 and the second Fat Pizza vs. Housos in 2014, also featured characters from another Paul Fenech comedy series Housos.

Season 4 saw the shop move locations from Greenacre to Station Street, Fairfield Heights, NSW. This season also coincided with the addition of new cast members to the main Fat Pizza crew. The start of season 5 once again saw the store move locations, this time to a small shopping complex situated on Canberra Street, St Johns Park, NSW where it remained till the end of the series before its subsequent reboot of the series in 2019 which began season 6.

In August 2019, it was announced the series would be returning for a new season on Seven Network's multichannel 7mate, titled Fat Pizza: Back In Business. The season premiered on 5 November 2019. On 29 January 2020, it was announced that Fat Pizza: Back in Business had been renewed for another season. The season renewal was officially confirmed at Seven's Upfronts in October 2020, and premiered on 8 September 2021.

== Synopsis ==
The show focuses on the activities of Pauly and his co-workers, as they deliver pizzas for "Fat Pizza", the Sydney-based pizzeria of Bobo Gigliotti, whose slogan is "they're big and they're cheesy".

Throughout the series, the dangers of pizza delivery are exemplified by encounters with aliens, killer kangaroos, bikies, bogans, petty criminals, muggers, drug dealers, addicts and/or cartels, dominatrices, celebrities, the CIA, ASIO, Australian Border Force, the Australian Taxation Office, the New South Wales Police Force, the National Rugby League, the Australian Federal Police, the Australian Army, Arab and Asian terrorists, organised crime gangs and even evil Satanic forces that conspire to bring about the end of the world. In spite of this, the characters remain unfazed and unsurprised, and they persist in their dead-end, below-minimum-wage job, which pays A$2.00 per hour.

== Cast ==
=== Main ===
Actor	Role	Character description
Paul Fenech	Pauly Falzoni	Main protagonist, pizza delivery man, boxer, aspiring 'fil-um maker', one of Fat Pizza's longest-serving employees and (since season 6) the owner/manager of Fat Pizza. Pauly's father is Maltese and his mother is Mexican, and he also has Italian and Spanish roots. In season 6, Pauly reopens the shop after Bobo is imprisoned.
Paul Nakad	David "Sleek the Elite" Arafat	Main co-star in the first two seasons and the movie. An aspiring rapper, ladies' man and pizza delivery man who dubs himself the 'Lebanese Lover' or 'Lebanese Legend'. He is kidnapped by Islamic terrorists while holidaying in Lebanon, for "rooting all their women". He is portrayed as a closeted bisexual male. He is replaced by Rocky's other cousin, Slick, who is killed off by Bobo. Sleek returns to work for Bobo in the Fat Pizza vs. Housos movie, after a stint in Guantanamo Bay for being mistaken for a terrorist, and eventually runs his own kebab shop. He is arrested after being mistakenly blamed for the attempted assassination of Premier Campbell Abbott, after which he shares a prison cell with Bubbles from Housos.
John Boxer	Bobo Gigliotti	Psychotic chef and owner/manager of Fat Pizza. He is impatient and those that cross him usually end up on the wrong end of his chainsaw. He is a stingy, crooked boss, consistently docking the delivery boys' pay for any deviation from schedule. After his Vietnamese mail-order bride Lin Chow is deported, Bobo becomes engaged to former porn actress Ruby a.k.a. 'Mama Jugs' (Angela White), much to the disgust of his Mama. Bobo makes a cameo in a Housos episode with his trademark chainsaw. Bobo is imprisoned for 25 years after the events that transpired in the Fat Pizza vs. Housos movie, but escapes from prison, stealing his chainsaw from the shop. He returns to rescue Pauly from Ronnie McDoggle. Pauly helps get the charges against Bobo dropped, and he returns to work at Fat Pizza, but is eventually fired after Pauly finds dismembered body parts in the freezer.
Tahir Bilgiç	Habib Halal Habib	A supporting character in the earlier series of Pizza and a main role in Fat Pizza. A friend of Sleek's, he is a stereotypical young Lebanese drug-dealer and fence of stolen goods. He is eventually employed at the shop as a delivery man, which he uses as a front for his illegal activities. He claims that he is socially inept, and used to be moderately successful with attractive women, but has developed a fetish for 'fat chicks' and has hitched up with Toula.
Jason "Jabba" Davis	David 'Davo' Dinkum	A stereotypical bong-smoking Aussie bogan. Being the only non-'choco' at Fat Pizza sometimes leaves him discriminated against, but is friends with Habib. Introduced in the movie, he has appeared ever since. Davo is eventually sacked and spends most of his time getting stoned and drunk and looking for pot-smoking bogan chicks from Hashfield. He wears thongs as training footwear.
Maria Venuti	Maria 'Mama' Gigliotti	Bobo's overbearing Italian mother who once owned Fat Pizza. Despite her being physically abusive, Bobo loves her and lives with her, until he is sent to prison. Since Bobo's imprisonment, Mama has been in a state of shock and is looked after by her nephew, Renzo.
George Kapiniaris	Ronnie McDoggle	The mascot of McDoggle's and Pauly's archnemesis. After a car accident with Pauly, Pauly kicks him in the testicles, causing him to be infertile and lose his sanity. He makes a cameo in Fat Pizza vs. Housos, plotting a drive-by shooting on Pauly. The plan changes, and Ronnie instead coward-punches Pauly. He is the main antagonist of seasons 6 and 7, in which he makes many failed attempts to harm or kill Pauly, eventually succeeding in cutting off one of Pauly's testicles.

=== Supporting ===
Actor	Role	Character description
Rob Shehadie	Robert "Rocky" Shekazbah	Self-stylised 'Lebanese Rambo'. A tall, muscular, homophobic, egotistical Lebanese friend/second cousin of Habib (often role of enforcer), seems to be able to score with any number of young (and likely underage) women.
Rebel Wilson	Toula Maccalopolous	Habib's obese Greek-Australian girlfriend then wife. She refers to him as her 'Habibi'. She is a voracious eater. She accompanies Pauly and Rocky in the Pizza World mockumentary. She is obsessively controlling over Habib's life. She uses her gang, 'Fat Chick 12' to prevent strippers from attending Habib's buck's night. After they are married, she prevents Habib from returning to work, however in season 5, he returns to work and avoids her, saying he is busy with work.
Katrina Spadone	Katrina (Kat for short)	Toula's best friend and Rocky's girlfriend. In the recent series of Pizza, Katrina develops a crush on Pauly when Rocky mistreats her. She breaks up and re-unites with Rocky several times. In World Record Pizza, she joins Pauly, Habib and Kev on their trip around the globe. However, she decides to remain in Brazil with her new boyfriend. She has since re-appeared throughout seasons 5 and 7.
Tuyen Le	Lin Chow Bang	Bobo's Vietnamese mail-order bride. The Fat Pizza movie partly deals with the arrival of Lin Chow and her family, and at the end of season 3 she is deported back to Vietnam, due to Habib and Rocky turning informant in order to avoid drug charges and jail.
Annalise Braakensiek	Claudia MacPherson	Dimwitted, rich, blonde, bulimic and attractive supermodel, her name is a play on Claudia Schiffer and Elle Macpherson. She is a regular customer, and often has run-ins with Pauly and Sleek.
Murray Harman	Officer Murray	Hot headed cop who does not like paper work, and has many run ins with Pauly. (In seasons 6 and 7, Harman reprises his role as Officer Richard Head from Housos).
John Mangos	The Newsreader	

=== Employees at Fat Pizza ===
Actor	Role	Character description
Kevin Taumata	Kev the Kiwi	Stereotypical Māori Australian, who often sneaks to a local pub to "git on thuh puhss." Kev often uses New Zealand slang including "choice!" and "bro". He also has a small rivalry with Junior and is always seen with his sunglasses on. Taumata also appears in Series 6 and 7, as his character, Kevin Takamata, from Housos.
Andrew Ausage	Junior	Bobo's apprentice chef, who, like Bobo, abuses the other employees. Sometimes Junior adds Samoan-inspired ingredients on pizzas, such as pig snouts, turtle meat and cooked Hāngī meat. In season 7, Junior returns after Pauly hires him as chef, but is fired, after repeatedly ignoring Pauly's instructions to not give away free pizzas to his relatives.
Alex Romano	DJ BJ	'BJ' ('Big Jams') is young employee, and the main target of Bobo and Junior's abuse. He enjoys playing his turntable but is also clumsy and weak, resulting in occasional accidents and injuries.
Anh Do	Chen Chong Fat (a.k.a. Keith)	Stereotypical Asian, who tries to get into Australian culture, eating pies and sausage rolls and using outdated slang. He is eventually framed for eating a police dog and is sent to jail.
Joe June	Jingping	The first chef to be hired at the new Fat Pizza in season 6. He only speaks Chinese and communicates with Pauly via a translator. After being blackmailed by Ronnie McDoggle, he resigns, upon which Pauly discovers that Jingping was also an animal smuggler. He is eventually rehired as chef after learning English, under the pretense that Pauly helps him with his animal smuggling.
Peter Chidiac	Jayden Brown	
Umit Bali	Umit	
Yasmin Horner	Yasmina	
Giani Leon	The Kid	A mute, BMX-riding employee who begins working for Pauly. He is a good pizza deliverer, often disappearing from view immediately after handing the customers their pizzas. He is also an excellent fighter.
Maria Tran	Suzie	Jingping's daughter, who first appears alongside her father during his job interview with Pauly. She begins working as a deliverer, when her father is rehired as chef. Pauly is unable to pronounce her Chinese name, so refers to her as 'Suzie'.

=== Minor / recurring ===
Actor	Role	Character description	Eps.
Alex Haddad	Mohammed 2		7
Angela White	Ruby / Registrar		4
Anthony Salame	Omar	Habib's cousin and best friend of his cousin Mohammed. Most often seen with Habib and Rocky, he helps Habib do an insurance job on the old Fat Pizza premises.	7
Bessie Bardot	Shiba's Wife / Pussy Galore		4
Bob Ellis	Premier of NSW		3
Chris Franklin	Dazza		8
Desan Padayachee	Sahib		
James Liotta	Lino Falzoni		
John Mangos	Newsreader		18
Mario Fenech	Uncle Shiba		3
Paul Fenech	Alfredo Falzoni		44
Phen Yee Sng	Lin Chow Bang's Father		
Stephanie Chaves-Jacobsen	Selina		5
Tania Zaetta	Zane		9
Tuyen Le	Lin Chow Bang		7

=== Guests (partial) ===
Actor	Role	Eps.
Ada Nicodemou	Policewoman	1
Amanda Keller	Jessica Browe	1
Andrew Doyle	Ronny McDonny from 'Freaky Pizza'	1
Angry Anderson	Bikie Leader / Captain / Tattoost / Vietnam Vet	4
Anthony Mundine	The Man	1
Barry Crocker	Clarence Bumpkin	1
Benita Collings	Wowser Lady	1
Bernard King	Kenneth / TV Chef	2
Bill Bentley	Dr. Freeman	1
Bill Hunter	Police Detective	2
Brendan Jones	Karl Stiffanovic	2
Bruno Xavier	Mahatma Gandhi	2
Callan Mulvey	Dave / Middle Class Homeboy	2
Carl Barron	Junkie	1
Chris Franklin	Dazza	1
Clementine Heath	Kinky Girl	1
Cornelia Frances	Welfare Officer	1
Costas Kilias	Husband / Wrestler	2
Craig Ward	Stomach Rumbling Guy / Aussie Pub Guy	3
Damian de Montemas		1
David McCormack	Middle Class Homeboy / Spruiker	2
David Stratton	Himself	1
Denise Roberts	Jackie / Mum Stanko	2
Fiona Horne	Survivor Host	1
Garry Who	Lifesaver Les / Aussie / Gold Guy	4
Gary Sweet	Army Commander	1
Gerard Kennedy	Agent Dave	1
Gerry Sont	Ad Director	1
Graeme Blundell	Judge	1
Greg Evans	Dating Show Host / Garden Host	2
Guy Sebastian	Himself	1
Holly Brisley	Louise	4
Ian Turpie	Head Detective	2
Imogen Annesley	Angelina	1
Indira Naidoo		1
Jack Levi	Aussie RMA Guy / Elliot Goblet	3
Jean Kittson	Psychiatrist	1
Jeff Fenech	Himself	1
Jim Webb	Jim Smith / Big Jim / Bogan Thief / Fat Guy / Kev's Cousin / Sam the Fat Guy	9
Joe Bugner	Barman	1
John Hamblin	Judge	1
John Orcsik	Agent Sam	1
John Seru	Lennox Blewis (boyfriend)	3
Jon English		1
Kamahl	Gas n' Go Attendant	1
Kirsty Lee Allan	Sharona, a waitress	1
Krista Vendy	Secretary	1
Kym Gyngell	Bank Manager	1
Lee Kernaghan		1
Lex Marinos	Habib's Judge / Sleek's Lawyer	2
Lochie Daddo	Eddie Galah	1
Lorraine Bayly	The Fairy	1
Machine Gun Fellatio	The Satanists	1
Maggie Kirkpatrick	Joan 'The Freak' Ferguson	1
Margaret Pomeranz	Herself	1
Mark Holden	Detention Guard	1
Melissa Tkautz	Chantelle	1
Merv Hughes	Ivan Milat (Fat Pizza)	1
Michael Craig	Judge / Priest	2
Michael Diamond	Himself	
Michael Veitch	John Pokonjak / Nerd	2
Nathan Harvey	Dougie the Pizza Hut Guy	1
Nick Barker	Hitman	1
Nick Giannopoulos	Yugoslav Taxi Driver	1
Nicky Whelan	Cheerleader	1
Paula Duncan	Lorelei Wilkinson	1
Peter Everitt	Tries to steal money from Pauly for cigarettes	
Peter Moon	Morning Crew	1
Phillip Scott	Prime Minister John Howard	2
Red Symons	Bumpkin Cop	
Renzo Bellato	Leonard the Nut / Madonna Thief	4
Richard Carter	Detective / Bad Cop / Dad Stanko	4
Rob Carlton	Hot Dog Vendor	1
Ron Jeremy	Porn Star	1
Roslyn Oades	Cashier / Sunny	2
Rowena Wallace	Anne Griffin	1
Shane Porteous	Doctor / Registrar	5
Tim Ferguson	David Cockerfield (Fat Pizza) / Julian Bausage	2
Tim Shaw	Himself / Financial Consultant	1
Tommy Dysart	50s Pizza Couple	1
Tony Barber	Rupert Packer	2
Tony Bonner	S.A.S. Captain	1
Tony Mokbel	Himself	
Tottie Goldsmith	Kinky	2
Val Lehman	Bea Smith	1
Vince Sorrenti	Bobo's Lawyer / Lawyer / Monk	3
Warwick Capper	Dwayne	1
Waseem Khan	Cab Driver / Indian Cab Driver / Pussy Master / Attendant 2 / Cabbie / Car Guy / Cashier / Doctor / Indian / Indian Doctor 2 / Indian Teller 2 / Kareem / Station Attendant / Taxi / Telemarketing Guy / Waseem	20
Wendy Harmer	Morning Crew	1

== Characters (by season) ==
Characters	Television series		Films	
Characters	Pizza	Fat Pizza: Back in Business	Fat Pizza	Fat Pizza vs. Housos
Characters	2000–2007	2019–present	2003	2014
Pauly Falzoni	Paul Fenech	Paul Fenech	Paul Fenech	Paul Fenech
Sleek the Elite	Paul Nakad	Paul Nakad	Paul Nakad	Paul Nakad
Bobo Gigliotti	John Boxer	John Boxer	John Boxer	John Boxer
Mama Gigliotti	Maria Venuti	Maria Venuti	Maria Venuti	Maria Venuti
Ronnie McDoggle	George Kapiniaris	George Kapiniaris	George Kapiniaris	George Kapiniaris
Habib	Tahir Bilgiç	Flashbacks	Tahir Bilgiç	Tahir Bilgiç
Davo Dinkum	Jason "Jabba" Davis	Flashbacks	Jason "Jabba" Davis	Jason "Jabba" Davis
Rocky	Rob Shehadie	Flashbacks	Rob Shehadie	Rob Shehadie
Toula	Rebel Wilson			Unknown actress; face not shown
Katrina	Katrina Spadone Garcia	Katrina Spadone Garcia		
Claudia MacPherson	Annalise Braakensiek		Annalise Braakensiek	
Officer Murray	Murray Harman		Murray Harman	
Newsreader	John Mangos	John Mangos	John Mangos	John Mangos
Junior	Andrew Ausage	Andrew Ausage		Andrew Ausage
Kev the Kiwi	Kevin Taumata	Kevin Taumata		Kevin Taumata
DJ BJ	Alex Romano			
Chong Fat	Anh Do			
Uncle Shiba	Mario Fenech	Mario Fenech	Mario Fenech	
Angry	Angry Anderson	Angry Anderson	Angry Anderson	Angry Anderson
Dazza	Chris Franklin	Different incarnation of Dazza	Chris Franklin	
Ruby	Angela White			
Omar	Anthony Salame			
Alfredo Falzoni	Paul Fenech	Paul Fenech		
Anthony Mundine	Anthony Mundine	Anthony Mundine		
Waseem	Waseem Khan	Waseem Khan	Waseem Khan	Waseem Khan
Leonard the Nut	Renzo Bellato			
Elliot Goblet	Jack Levi		Jack Levi	
Lino Falzoni	Off-screen	James Liotta	Off-screen	
Lin Chow Bang	Tuyen Le	Flashbacks	Tuyen Le	
Lin Chow Bang's Father	Phen Yee Sng	Flashbacks	Phen Yee Sng	
Sahib			Desan Padayachee	
David Cockerfield			Tim Ferguson	
Jeff Fenech		Different incarnation of Jeff	Jeff Fenech	
Shazza Jones		Elle Dawe		Elle Dawe
Officer Gary Kock		Garry Who		Garry Who
Officer Richard Head		Murray Harman		Murray Harman
Campbell Abbott		Brendan "Jonesy" Jones		Brendan "Jonesy" Jones
Abdul		Ashur Shimon		Ashur Shimon
Renzo		Renzo Bellato		Renzo Bellato
Jenny the Junkie		Ashley Avci		Ashley Avci
Big Wheels		Jimmy Jackson		Jimmy Jackson
Bubbles		Derek Boyer		Derek Boyer
Tina		Melissa Tkautz		
Dr. Jean Ferguson		Jean Kittson		
Julian Bousage		Tim Ferguson		
Louise		Holly Brisley		
Albert Pike		Patrick Spicer		
Binh		Diana Nguyen		
Benny		Benny Bogan		
Jingping		Joe June		
Jingping's Daughter		Maria Tran		
Jayden Brown		Peter Chidiac		
Tuco Suarez		Rodrrigo Jimenez		
Umit		Umit Bali		
The Kid		Giani Leon		
Mary Falzoni		Makedonka Stoilova		
Holden Jones		Kyrah Brock-Fenton		

== Series overview ==
Series	Channel	Episodes	Originally released	
Series	Channel	Episodes	First released	Last released
1	SBS	9	24 April 2000	19 June 2000
2	SBS	10	27 August 2001	29 October 2001
3	SBS	10	21 July 2003	22 September 2003
4	SBS	8	30 May 2005	18 July 2005
5	SBS	8	22 October 2007	10 December 2007
6	7mate	4	5 November 2019	26 November 2019
7	7mate	7	8 September 2021	20 October 2021

== Episodes ==
=== Series 1 (2000) ===
No. overall	No. in season	Title	Original release date
1	1	"Dangerous Pizza"	24 April 2000
The pilot, introduces Bobo, Bobo's mother, Claudia MacPherson, Pauly and Sleek, who is beginning his first shift. The episode underlines that delivering pizzas is one of the most dangerous jobs in the Western World. At the end of the episode, Pauly is abducted by aliens. Guest Stars/Cameos; Frenzal Rhomb, Normie Rowe, Col Joye and John Mangos as himself.
2	2	"Space Pizza"	1 May 2000
The episode introduces Rocky and Habib. Pauly has been dumped in the desert by the aliens and tries to find his way back to civilization. Meanwhile Bobo has employed a new pizza deliverer in place of Pauly. However, the new deliverer ends up being killed by an axe murderer. Guest Stars/Cameos; Barry Crocker
3	3	"Film Pizza"	8 May 2000
An actor attempts to sue Fat Pizza for damages following an altercation with Bobo, Sleek also attempts to file a lawsuit, against a Wrestler, meanwhile, the filming of a "James Bond" movie takes place at a nearby Movie studio, and frequent usage of Mobile Phones results in a petrol station in Campsie blowing up. Guest Stars/Cameos; Kamahl, Jon English and Dr. Karl.
4	4	"Crime Pizza"	15 May 2000
The premier of New South Wales passes a new homeboy law allowing police to detain and search anyone in a baseball hat or tracksuit. Unfortunately for the workers at the Fat Pizza pizzeria, their uniforms consist of tracksuits and baseball caps. Pauly is arrested in a case of mistaken identity by two hopeless detectives. A disgruntled customer hires a hitman to kill Pauly because of a mix-up on a pizza delivery. Even though it is Sleek's birthday he is beaten Rodney King-style by the whole police force. Claudia MacPherson has been videoed having sex with her boyfriend and the video is being broadcast on the internet and Mama Gigliotti is under attack by some middle-class homeboys. Guest Stars/Cameos; Ada Nicodemou and Ian Turpie narrating Australia's Most Wanted style.
5	5	"Crazy Pizza"	22 May 2000
Bobo closes the shop early and gets ready to date a sexy somebody he met online. Sleek and Pauly have a night in the town. As usual, not all is well at Fat Pizza. A colossal road rage incident ensues: bouncers, midgets, plane crashes and dead bodies turn the night upside down. The episode's finale parodies The Adventures of Priscilla, Queen of the Desert.
6	6	"Love Pizza"	29 May 2000
Supermodel Claudia MacPherson is marrying actor Roger Connery the new Bond film star. Pauly joins the army reserves (thinking he will meet girls). Bobo falls in love with Angelina, Pauly's replacement and the two set off to get married in Sicily. Sleek tries out a new deodorant that leaves such an attractive scent he ends up in tight squeezes with drag queens, crazy chefs, a porn star, and a rock band called Marilyn's Regurgitators. In the end after his mother has a health scare, Bobo decides to take care of his mother and postpone his wedding. Unfortunately, Angelina has found love in Sicily with Marilyn's Regurgitators. Guest Stars/Cameos; Frenzal Rhomb and Gary Sweet.
7	7	"Road Trip Pizza"	5 June 2000
A former employee of Fat Pizza shoots Bobo in the groin, resulting in him being taken to hospital and requiring surgery. While this is happening, Sleek and Pauly take a road trip to the Gold Coast, along the way they have their share of stories and mishaps, including Pauly telling Sleek his bad experience involving the Pope at a prawn factory, Sleek hanging out with some campers with drugs and Pauly being shocked by urinating on a barbed-wire fence. Guest Stars/Cameos; Michael Veitch, Elliot Goblet and Tottie Goldsmith.
8	8	"Snowy Pizza"	12 June 2000
It is Australia Day at the Fat Pizza pizzeria. Sleek is exhausted after winning a rap marathon and dreams himself into colonial times, although in his dreams colonial Australia keeps turning into a rap video clip with sexy female dancers at every corner. He becomes the man from Snowy Pizza. Bobo is furious at TV chef Bernard for giving a bad review on his pizzas and wants revenge. Claudia MacPherson hires a personal trainer because she is told she is fat, and Pauly attempts to resuscitate a heart attack victim with a vacuum cleaner.
9	9	"Gambling Pizza"	19 June 2000
After their shifts, Sleek and Bobo head out to the casino to place some bets. While Sleek wins, Bobo is on a losing streak and finds himself desperate enough to bet his shop. Unfortunately, Bobo loses, and Pauly and Sleek find themselves working at the pizza shop for their new bosses, the Mafia. Guest Stars/Cameos; Tania Zaetta, Paula Duncan, Val Lehman as Top Dog, Maggie Kirkpatrick as The Freak.

=== Series 2 (2001) ===
No. overall	No. in season	Title	Original release date
10	1	"New Pizza"	27 August 2001
The shop is moved to Hashfield, a dangerous neighborhood, where Pauly and Sleek encounter many problems with the locals. The media films Bobo making pizzas in an unhygienic fashion.
11	2	"Politically Incorrect Pizza"	3 September 2001
Assault charges are pressed against Pauly, who defends himself after being abused by an old and disabled man, against Bobo, who prejudicially declined the applications of a lesbian, a blind man, an obese man and an old and disabled man, and against Habib, Rocky and the boys who faked that they were disabled but were caught out comfortably playing rugby in the park. In the end with the help of Sleek all charges are dropped. Guest Stars/Cameos; Diana Glenn and Ross Higgins.
12	3	"Sexy Pizza"	10 September 2001
Pauly thinks he is on a mystery flight to Surfers Paradise, but ends up in Vietnam. Bobo buys toxic cheese from Russia and Sleek, who thinks he is gay, delivers to the Mardi Gras. Guest Stars/Cameos; Big Kev and Tony Barber.
13	4	"Millionaire Pizza"	17 September 2001
Sleek stars in a Survivor-style reality program with six beautiful models. Pauly encounters legal troubles after a run-in with boxer Mike Titan and seeks a solution via a road rage incident with Anthony Mundine. Bobo gets a new apprentice who is subjected to "apprentice abuse". Guest Stars/Cameos; Tony Barber and Anthony Mundine.
14	5	"Melbourne Pizza"	24 September 2001
Pauly and Sleek have the day off work and decide to drive to Melbourne. They stay in a hotel and set out to some night clubs to meet some girls. Sleek successfully hooks up with women, while Pauly, who has unknowingly taken ecstasy, returns to the home of a girl he meets and engages in many problems that evolve into fights. Guest Stars/Cameos; Nick Giannopoulos, Tottie Goldsmith and Costas Kilias.
15	6	"Flashback Pizza"	1 October 2001
Pauly and Sleek get the day off work as Bobo has an appointment with a psychiatrist amid concerns claim that he is crazy. Guest Stars/Cameos; Diana Glenn, Kim Gyngell and Jean Kittson.
16	7	"Freaky Pizza"	8 October 2001
Pauly is forced to babysit his uncle's grossly overweight child and runs into severe problems when his car is stolen. Meanwhile Claudia McPherson needs a new kidney and an organ harvester has found an unbeknownst donor in Sleek.
17	8	"Girlfriend Pizza"	15 October 2001
The men all have girlfriend/dating experiences. Pauly is dating two girls at once and does not know which one is worse, Bobo has a date with a disabled bad-tempered woman who will not accept any help at all, and Sleek has a new girlfriend Dina (Briar Hawkins) who, much to his horror, is a stripper. Guest Stars/Cameos; Diana Glenn and Richard Carter.
18	9	"ANZAC Pizza"	22 October 2001
Pauly wants to march in the ANZAC Day parade but is repeatedly sidetracked. Guest Stars/Cameos; Ross Higgins
19	10	"Desert Pizza"	29 October 2001
Sleek, Pauly and his uncle are fishing on a boat, they have some bait which contains marijuana, goat's cheese and petrol. Sleek accidentally rolls up a joint and lights it only to realise that the boat had exploded. The explosion sends Pauly and Sleek out to sea where they end up as castaways on an island. Guest Stars/Cameos; Tony Nikolakopoulos

=== Series 3 (2003) ===
No. overall	No. in season	Title	Original release date
20	1	"Brand New Pizza"	21 July 2003
A host of new employees start at Fat Pizza such as Sleek's cousin Slick and a brain damaged apprentice chef alongside Habib and Rocky. Meanwhile Bobo is on edge because his new wife Lin Chow will not sleep with him. Guest Stars/Cameos; Cornelia Frances, Angry Anderson and Michael Veitch.
21	2	"Terrorism Pizza"	28 July 2003
New laws against terrorism spell big trouble for the boys at Fat Pizza as Habib, Rocky and Pauly are all mistaken for terrorists.
22	3	"Cult Pizza"	4 August 2003
Bobo instructs his crew to work dressed with Christmas attire in July, which was encouraged by Bobo's mail-order bride Lin Chow, while Davo is engrossed in a new religion. Pauly is also suspected as a stalker and a "paedophile".
23	4	"School Pizza"	11 August 2003
Pauly reconnects with an old classmate who had a crush on him through several pizza deliveries. Meanwhile Habib and Rocky try out a new scam inside an ATM which is stolen by bogans with Habib still inside and Bobo is busted perving on Claudia MacPherson by his wife and his mother. Guest Stars/Cameos; Holly Brisley
24	5	"Road Trip Pizza"	18 August 2003
Habib and Pauly lie about being sick and take a road trip to Melbourne with Rocky and Toula. Once there Pauly has another run-in with the kinky sex chick and her husband whilst Habib and Rocky attack an AFL umpire. Back at Fat Pizza Davo has been forced to do all the deliveries and has sexual experiences with lesbians, twins and even implies one with Claudia MacPherson. Guest Stars/Cameos; Warwick Capper, Tottie Goldsmith and Costas Kilias.
25	6	"SEXPO Pizza"	25 August 2003
The episode is told through flashback and interviews. The boys take a trip to SEXPO because Habib is interested in making a porno and wants to find actresses to perform in it. This episode is rated MA as opposed to the others which are rated M. Guest Stars/Cameos; Ron Jeremy and Serenity.
26	7	"Birthday Pizza"	1 September 2003
It is Bobo's birthday and the boys have hired a stripper for him whom his mother and wife catch him out with. Meanwhile Rocky has a new girlfriend, Habib is pulling off an insurance scam with Toula, Pauly has to change his attitude to impress his new girlfriend Daniella and Davo's new addiction may prove to be more troublesome than his last.
27	8	"Quarantine Pizza"	8 September 2003
Bobo orders Habib and Pauly to steal some chickens to have more ingredients. However, when they realise that the chickens are infected with bird flu and are causing fatalities to the customers, Fat Pizza is put into quarantine.
28	9	"Refugee Pizza"	15 September 2003
Habib and Rocky have been arrested for a range of offences forcing Toula and Katrina to take on their deliveries. Meanwhile Bobo's mother takes Lin Chow and her family to beach for the day and a series of misfortunes kill them all except Lin, Davo cannot remember what he did last night and Pauly hooks up with a new girl who just happens to have eight kids. In the end Lin is busted by immigration authorities and deported thanks to Rocky and Habib. Guest Stars/Cameos; Melissa Tkautz, Angry Anderson and Richard Carter.
29	10	"Pizza Live"	22 September 2003
The Fat Pizza crew "hijack" SBS and broadcast live in protest of the "cancellation" of the show.

=== Series 4 (2005) ===
No. overall	No. in season	Title	Original release date
30	1	"New Shop Pizza"	30 May 2005
With help from a financial consultant, Bobo completely overhauls Fat Pizza. With a new location, new staff and new delivery vehicles, business soon begins booming but not everyone is happy with all the changes. Guest Stars/Cameos; Angry Anderson
31	2	"Small And Large Pizza"	6 June 2005
After a string of driving offences, Pauly is forced to get a new car to fit new regulations implemented by the court. Meanwhile Fat Pizza's oven has broken, Rocky and Kev get into a fight over Katrina, and a new police officer is causing a little trouble. Guest Stars/Cameos; Jade Gatt and Ryan Lappin.
32	3	"Father's Day Pizza"	13 June 2005
Pauly reminisces about his father, who was forced to leave his wife and 4-year-old son to work with the British Government, and his adventures that are portrayed as that of James Bond's before he arrived in Australia. Guest Stars/Cameos; Bessie Bardot, Michael Craig as Priest, Anthony Sumbati as Ian Fleming, and SS John Oxley.
33	4	"Holiday Pizza, Part One"	20 June 2005
Due to daylight saving, Pauly mistakenly arrives at work one hour early only to see Bobo with a transvestite. Pauly uses his mobile phone to take photos and blackmails Bobo, requesting two weeks paid holiday to Italy or he would show the photos to Bobo's mother. Pauly arrives in Italy to stay with his cousin Luigi and accidentally spends an evening with a €100 per hour escort before being mugged by gypsies, which forces him to work as a pizza delivery boy for money.
34	5	"Holiday Pizza, Part Two"	27 June 2005
Luigi and Pauly are supposed to go to Sicily but Luigi's ego makes both of them follow two women to Venice.
35	6	"Waitress Pizza"	4 July 2005
A new waitress at Fat Pizza sees the boys compete for her affection. Guest Stars/Cameos; Kirsty Lee Allan
36	7	"Burnout Pizza"	11 July 2005
Habib, Toula, Rocky and Katrina accompany Pauly so that he can race in a drag racing competition being held on the Gold Coast in Queensland.
37	8	"Habib's Wedding Pizza"	18 July 2005
Habib marries Toula, after proposing to her when he was drunk, at a shifty venue. Bobo is the caterer, DJ BJ is the DJ, Chong Fat and Kev are the waiters. Arguments and punch-ups arise from who had booked the venue, the religion of Toula and Habib, the wedding singer, and Habib's dad, who returns from Cuba as he had been in Guantánamo Bay, shows his dislike for Toula.

=== Series 5 (2007) ===
No. overall	No. in season	Title	Original release date
38	1	"Carwash Pizza"	22 October 2007
Bobo does an insurance job on his old Fat Pizza pizzeria and buys a new shop in Hashfield Valley, but because business is so bad he is forced to turn the shop into a pizzeria café car wash. Guest Stars/Cameos; Angela White
39	2	"Law And Order Pizza"	29 October 2007
Davo steals a police drug-sniffer dog and then tells the cops when the dog was suddenly cut up into pieces, Chong Fat is suspected of the crime. Chong Fat admits that Davo had stolen the dog, Habib and Rocky had stolen the dog off Davo and offered him a ransom to pay if he wanted it back or else they would chop off its head. Davo is taken to the police station and tells the officers that Habib and Rocky then stole the dog off him. The cops arrested Rocky and Habib and took them to trial. Habib confesses that he took the dog but then gave him to Bobo who was believed to have cut it up to use for pizza meat. Bobo is then sentenced to trial and admits that Chong Fat had cut up the dog. Chong Fat is then taken into custody and sentenced to prison, where he is raped by a gay cell-mate (the same inmate who also raped Habib in New Shop Pizza).
40	3	"Melbourne Cup Pizza"	5 November 2007
Bobo holds a Melbourne cup lunch at Fat Pizza. Everything goes wrong, from bad food to power failures and the obese customers are unhappy at the lack of food and alcohol.
41	4	"Beach Pizza, Part One"	12 November 2007
Bobo has a day off and goes to Cronulla beach with his ex-porn star girlfriend Ruby. The day explodes into mayhem as pizza deliveries go wrong and Habib and Rocky accidentally start a riot with lifesavers. The media then interview Pauly and he is taken out of context and blamed as the instigator of the Cronulla Beach riot. Guest Stars/Cameos; Angela White
42	5	"Beach Pizza, Part Two"	19 November 2007
After causing the Cronulla riots and bashing radio shock jock Allen Ford Jones, Pauly and Junior are deported to Coconut Island. However, the department of immigration makes a mistake and they are sent to Crocodile Island. Guest Stars/Cameos; Angela White
43	6	"Doctor Pizza"	26 November 2007
During an argument over cockroaches on Bobo's pizzas, Bobo accidentally bites off Rocky's finger. Both are sent to Hashfield Hospital, meanwhile Pauly is road raging all the hospital doctors and after bashing them there are no doctors to help Bobo and Rocky. In the end Junior decides to help with Bobo's surgery (after he lied to a Coconut Island nurse saying that he is a doctor). Meanwhile DJ BJ had trouble with the golfing doctors. Guest Stars/Cameos; Edinson Cavani and Shane Porteous.
44	7	"Cracker Pizza"	3 December 2007
In response to a new Government ban on crackers and new "working for tips" laws, the pizza shop workers suffer more grief than usual. Habib sets off all his old crackers before the ban is enforced, Davo is arrested for robbing a service station to pay for pizzas and Pauly drives to Canberra with Habib's cousin Omar to buy crackers.
45	8	"Barbeque Pizza"	10 December 2007
Habib fakes the death of his wife, Toula, while she is in Greece whereby Habib receives $100,000. Bobo's gay Italian cousin Santino comes to visit from Italy. He shows Bobo how to make good pizzas. He gets a crush on DJ BJ. Bobo's mama goes interstate and Bobo has a barbeque to celebrate his engagement to his ex porn star girlfriend Ruby. Habib buries Toula's coffin (which he later tells Rocky there were only bricks in the coffin) and gets the insurance money. Guest Stars/Cameos; Angela White

=== Series 6 (2019) ===
No. overall	No. in series	Episode	Directed by	Written by	Original release date	Aus. viewers
46	1	"Episode 1"	Paul Fenech	Paul Fenech	5 November 2019	147,000
Pauly Falzoni, former pizza delivery boy, now boss, is trying to rebuild the infamous Fat Pizza restaurant in the notorious suburb of Hashfield. Guest Stars/Cameos; Anthony Mundine as himself
47	2	"Episode 2"	Paul Fenech	Paul Fenech	12 November 2019	170,000
Pauly becomes the victim of fake news and must deal with the backlash. Guest Stars/Cameos; Holly Brisley as Louise
48	3	"Episode 3"	Paul Fenech	Paul Fenech	19 November 2019	211,000
Pauly struggles to find delivery staff. During a routine delivery he discovers a secret about his father. Guest Stars/Cameos; Tim Ferguson as Julian Bousage
49	4	"Episode 4"	Paul Fenech	Paul Fenech	26 November 2019	160,000
Pauly finds himself in the middle of an assassination plot. Corrupt police, gang members, and a killer clown are all out for revenge.

=== Series 7 (2021) ===
No. overall	No. in series	Episode	Directed by	Written by	Original release date	Aus. viewers
50	1	"Great Escape Pizza"	Paul Fenech	Paul Fenech	8 September 2021	N/A
After a year on the run, hiding in Mexico on a private island run by Jeffrey Hepstein — a billionaire who faked his own death — Pauly returns to serve up some pizza. Pauly reopens the Fat Pizza shop with Bobo, his old pizza chef, but Bobo's PTSD gets in the way of a perfect opening. The killer clown Ronnie McDoggle is hunting Pauly. The state suffers multiple lockdowns due to COVID-19 and Richard Head, Pauly's old nemesis on the police force, is out to get him. Pauly battles gangs, artificial intelligence, crazy chefs, wild customers and corrupt officials. But as Pauly always says, "pizza delivery is a dangerous business". Fat Pizza is back in business. Guest Stars/Cameos; Jeff Fenech as Uncle Jeff
51	2	"Island Pizza"	Paul Fenech	Paul Fenech	15 September 2021	N/A
Pauly visits Julian Bousage in prison and tells him about his time hiding from the authorities in Mexico on a private island run by billionaire Jeffrey Hepstein. Later, Pauly interviews new staff before the store reopens, reaps the benefits of joining a local businessman's club, and has second thoughts about his decision to bring Bobo back. Guest Stars/Cameos; Tim Ferguson as Julian Bousage, George Smilovici as Jeffrey Hepstein
52	3	"Lino Pizza"	Paul Fenech	Paul Fenech	22 September 2021	N/A
Pauly fires Bobo after discovering he has been chopping up the customers. Needing new staff, Pauly hires his cousins, Lino and Mary, to help run the restaurant. Cop Richard Head tries to take down Pauly for taking advantage of his daughter, but bashes the wrong driver. Pauly's new driver, Jayden, has his kidneys harvested by a Mexican drug cartel. Pauly wakes up in the wrong bed after mixing his medication.
53	4	"Date Pizza"	Paul Fenech	Paul Fenech	29 September 2021	N/A
Pauly puts some new subwoofers in the Valiant, only to rear-end former cop Richard Head. Pauly's jiggly leg medication causes him to hallucinate. Pauly hires Junior, Bobo's old apprentice, to be the new pizza chef and breaks up a porno shoot behind the restaurant. Pauly double books after reconnecting with a pair of old crushes.
54	5	"Virus Pizza"	Paul Fenech	Paul Fenech	6 October 2021	N/A
Pauly self-medicates to treat his jiggly leg. Pauly's new deliverer is the best he has ever seen, but his other new hire needs some toughening up. Pauly trades his subwoofers for a pair of stooge-cancelling earphones. Hashfield enters its 15th virus lockdown, but Pauly gets Fat Pizza an essential service exemption, leading to a surge in business. Pauly avoids a kinky threesome. Killer clown Ronnie McDoggle kidnaps Pauly's psychiatrist, and has one of his men secretly working at Fat Pizza. Pauly fires Junior for giving away "cultural freebies".
55	6	"Big Brawl Pizza"	Paul Fenech	Paul Fenech	13 October 2021	N/A
Desperate for a new chef, Pauly buys the HAL 6000 pizza-making robot from China. Pauly agrees to help Jingping with his animal smuggling business. Pauly gives The Kid a road test to see if he can handle driving the Valiant. Hashfield's former mayor, and Pauly's Council contact, becomes the new premier. Pauly is living his best life as he finds himself in a friends-with-benefits situation with three women, and his stalker is willing to be in an open relationship. Pauly's jiggly leg meds cause him to hallucinate being in Grease. Pauly's bribes are tripled, but come with mad bonuses. Bobo plans his revenge.
56	7	"Clown Pizza"	Paul Fenech	Paul Fenech	20 October 2021	N/A
Pauly hires the former premier to be his new delivery man. With all his new drivers, Pauly is spending his time playing 80s video games and texting the girls he is dating. Pauly takes a couple days off to race his new supercar at Bathurst. While passed out with Tina, Pauly has a freaky dream in which he is chased across the Nevada desert by two spies and a UFO. Rambo is dognapped to lure Pauly into a trap set for him by Ronnie McDoggle and all those with a grudge against him.

=== Special series ===
==== Pizza Live (2004) ====
No.	Title	Original release date
1	"Episode 1"	17 May 2004
2	"Episode 2"	24 May 2004
3	"Episode 3"	31 May 2004
4	"Episode 4"	7 June 2004
5	"Episode 5"	14 June 2004

==== Pizza: Special Deliveries (2004) ====
No.	Title	Original release date
1	"History Pizza"	13 September 2004
A clip show of all the historical recreations featured in the series. Pauly emphasising his family's influence on all things pizza and Australian.
2	"Bobo And Pauly — The Early Years, Part One"	20 September 2004
3	"Bobo And Pauly — The Early Years, Part Two"	27 September 2004
4	"Pizza World — Tokyo"	4 October 2004
Pauly, Rocky and Toula travel around the world trying out different pizzas, meanwhile searching for the world's first pizzeria, found in Naples, Italy. They are flung across the world because of a cheap flight to Naples having so many connections.
5	"Pizza World — Los Angeles"	11 October 2004
6	"Pizza World — Las Vegas"	18 October 2004
7	"Pizza World — Rome"	25 October 2004
8	"Pizza World — Naples, Part One"	1 November 2004
9	"Pizza World — Naples, Part Two"	8 November 2004
10	"Pizza Does Nimbin"	15 November 2004
The Fat Pizza crew go to MardiGrass.

==== The DaVinci Cup (2006) ====
No.	Title	Original release date
1	"Episode 1"	22 May 2006
2	"Episode 2"	29 May 2006
3	"Episode 3"	5 June 2006

==== World Record Pizza (2007) ====
No.	Title	Original release date
1	"Bangkok"	19 March 2007
2	"India"	26 March 2007
3	"Amsterdam"	2 April 2007
4	"Paris And Malta"	9 April 2007
5	"Rio"	16 April 2007
6	"Australia"	23 April 2007

=== Specials ===
==== A Real Slice of Pizza (2001) ====
No.	Title	Original release date
S1	"A Real Slice Of Pizza"	5 November 2001
Behind-the-scenes of Pizza, including bloopers, deleted scenes and interviews.

==== Stage show (2016) ====
No.	Title	Original release date
DVD1	"Fat Pizza vs. Housos Live"	1 June 2016
A DVD release of the live stage show of Fat Pizza vs. Housos.

== Feature films ==
=== Fat Pizza (2003) ===
No.	Title	Original release date
F1	"Fat Pizza"	10 April 2003
Fat Pizza the film is yet another slice of life at a dodgy suburban Sydney take away. Bobo Gigliotti (who lives with his mother) is a psychotic pizzeria owner/pizza chef who is awaiting the arrival of his mail-order refugee bride Lin Chow Bang, and a new pizza deliverer is on the block. In the end, a group of biker thugs arrive at the new deliverers shop and threatens to murder everyone.

=== Fat Pizza vs. Housos (2014) ===
No.	Title	Original release date
F2	"Fat Pizza vs. Housos"	27 November 2014
After serving 15 years in jail for assaulting a health inspector with a chainsaw, pizza chef Bobo Gigliotti is released. Upon his release, he and his Mama attempt to reopen Fat Pizza, their former business in the fictional Sydney suburb of Hashfield. They soon find that due to rent increases since the time they were last in business, the only place that they can afford to reopen their pizzeria is in the infamous housing commission suburb of Sunnyvale. Employing many of their previous workers including Sleek the Elite, as well as a few locals, their re-establishment in Sunnyvale results in conflict with the local Housos, notably Shazza Jones, Franky Falzoni and Kev the Kiwi.

== Other appearances ==
- Fat Pizza: Sex, Drugs, Raps and Phones (2000): A single disc comedy album featuring sketches about Pauly, Sleek and Bobo. The album also features numerous rap songs performed by Paul Nakad (Sleek).
- Slices of Pizza: Live on Stage: A live stage show that toured Australia during the series early run, featuring many of the shows performers.
- Fat Pizza Fully Prank'd (20 November 2006): Shock Records WRXXX01. A compilation album of material from the banned "Fat Pizza Radio Show" and "Fat Pizza" soundtrack.

== Awards and nominations ==
Logie Award

- 2001: Most Outstanding Comedy Program (nominated)
- 2002: Most Outstanding Comedy Program (nominated)
- 2004: Most Outstanding Comedy Program (nominated)
- 2005: Most Outstanding Comedy Program (nominated)

Australian Comedy Awards

- 2003: Outstanding Australian TV Comedy – character based (nominated)

Australian Screen Sound Guild

- 2004: Best Achievement in Sound for a Television Program (won, for episode "School Pizza")

== Filming location ==
In Season 1, the internal and external shots of the Fat Pizza restaurant were filmed at 322 Pacific Highway, Lane Cove. The restaurant used for filming in Seasons 2 and 3, as well as the Fat Pizza movie and live shows, was at 67 Hume Highway, Chullora. The Chullora and Lane Cove shops had actually operated as pizzerias; the Lane Cove shop still operated until 2016 (Now demolished and rebuilt as apartments) and the Chullora shop operated as a pizzeria between 2000 and 2009, but as of 2013 it had been sold and the interior stripped completely. It was re-opened as "Kyoja Dumpling" a Vietnamese dumpling take away shop but was not profitable and by 2017 the shop was empty once again. In 2006 parts of the series were filmed at the Babel Restaurant in Fairfield Heights before moving to St Johns Park in 2007.

Some episodes were also in other parts of Australia. The cast also went to Bangkok, Thailand, Mumbai, India, Amsterdam, Netherlands, Los Angeles, United States, Las Vegas, United States, Rio de Janeiro, Brazil, Rome, Italy, Naples, Italy, Ho Chi Minh City, Vietnam, Malta and Paris, France.

== See also ==
- Fat Pizza vs. Housos
- Swift and Shift Couriers
- Housos
- Bogan Hunters
- List of Australian television series
