= Paul Nakad =

Australian actor and rapper (born 1975)

- Also known as: Sleek the Elite
- Born: Paul Nakad; 21 October 1975 (age 50)
- Genres: Hip-hop
- Occupations: Actor, rapper
- Instrument: Vocals
- Years active: 1991–present (as a rapper), 1998–present (as an actor)
- Labels: Sleekism Records; Madcap Records; Badfly Records

Paul Nakad (born 21 October 1975) is an Australian actor and rapper, best known by the name Sleek the Elite. He began performing music as Sleek the Elite in 1991, then appeared in the SBS television series Pizza as a character by that same name. He appeared on the first two seasons of Pizza from 2000 to 2001, and in the show's two spinoff films, Fat Pizza (2003) and Fat Pizza vs. Housos (2014).

== Early life ==
Born in Eastwood, New South Wales of Lebanese descent, Nakad grew up in the Ryde area. At the age of sixteen, Nakad left school. After leaving school he became a refrigeration and air-conditioning technician.

== Music ==
While working as a technician, Nakad spent his spare time writing music and constantly gigging in small clubs, on community radio and steadily building his form as a unique Lebanese Australian hip-hop voice. This street-cred and his poetic turn of phrase, freestyle technique, and audience support culminated in 1997 when he recorded his first album Sleekism. DJ Soup provided Nakad's unique sample-laden music with groovy, funky, hard hitting beats as well as production. Miguel D'Souza, the host of Mothership Connection on 2SER Community Radio collaborated with Sleek and provided additional vocals for Child of the Cedar.

In 2000, Madcap Records reissued Sleekism with altered artwork but with no content alterations. In 2004, Nakad released his second album Hard for a Rapper, which was produced by Def Wish Cast member Sereck. In 2007, rumours of a new album surfaced via his MySpace page.

=== Other appearances ===
In 2003, Nakad was guest programmer for Australian music show rage.

== Acting ==
In 1998, Nakad landed his first acting role in Paul Fenech's short film Basic Equipment, and then later Fenech's feature film, Somewhere in the Darkness. Nakad and Fenech adapted the Sleek the Elite persona to Fenech's comedy series Pizza in 2000 and 2001.

In 2003, Nakad appeared in the feature film Fat Pizza.

After the release of the movie version of the Pizza series, Nakad left the Pizza team to focus on his rap career, releasing Hard for a Rapper in 2004. Nakad also teamed up with comedian and actor Nick Giannopoulos, appearing in Wog Story. While the show was running in Melbourne, Paul Nakad shared a dressing room with Anh Do. Do was working on the script of the film Footy Legends, and created the role of Walid especially for Nakad.

Nakad appeared as the host of an automotive show called Pop Your Hood (produced by Templar Film & Television), the series was never picked up for air.

After many years of obscurity, Nakad played the role of Sleek the Elite once again in the 2014 motion picture Fat Pizza vs. Housos.

Nakad reprised his role as Sleek The Elite in the new series Fat Pizza: Back in Business that returned in 2019.

== Personal life ==
He was married in February 2011 at St Joseph's Maronite Catholic Church in Sydney.

== Discography ==
- Sleekism (1997) – Sleekism Records
- Sleekism (2000) – reissue from Madcap Records
- Sleek the Elite EP (2003) – Badfly Records
- Hard for a Rapper (2004) – Badfly Records

=== Compilations ===
- Home Brewz Volume 2, various artists (1997) – "Microphone Bangin'"
- Basic Equipment, various artists (1998) – "Revelations"
- Fat Pizza - Sex, Drugs, Raps and Phones, various artists (2000) – "Pizza"
- Stolen Records, various artists (2004) - "Basslines"
- Guttertalk, various artists (2015) - "Meat" (with Demunz & Supreme The Truth)

== Filmography ==
- Basic Equipment (1997), as Himself
- Fat Pizza (2003), as Sleek the Elite
- Footy Legends (2006), as Walid
- Fat Pizza vs. Housos (2014), as Sleek the Elite

=== Television ===
- Pizza (2000 - 2001), as Sleek the Elite
- Fat Pizza: Back In Business (2019 - 2021), as Sleek the Elite
