= Bessie Bardot =

Australian businesswoman, writer, model and television presenter (born 1974)

- Born: Bessie Wilson; 10 September 1974 (age 52); Blue Mountains, New South Wales, Australia
- Occupations: model, writer, television presenter
- Spouse: Geoff Barker
- Website: bessiebardot.com

Bessie Wilson, known professionally as Bessie Bardot (/ˈbɛsi bɑːrˈdoʊ/ bar-DOH; born 10 September 1974), is an Australian businesswoman, author, body model, television host, and socialite. Her career began in the 1990s, when she was discovered by former Australian Gladiator Geoff Barker.

== Early life ==
A child of hippie parents, she was born in the Blue Mountains, just west of Sydney in 1974. Her original name was Bessie Wilson and she attended Covenant Christian School, located in the Sydney suburb of Belrose. Given the nickname "Little Wing Kelly", she spent her early years in Mullumbimby in northern New South Wales. Her father disappeared when she was seven and she later discovered he had committed suicide.

Bardot's mother married a fundamentalist Christian, an original Hillsong pastor and introduced a strict regime at home including no Young Talent Time or boyfriends. Voted "least popular girl" in her final year at school, by the time she was 21 she had already been married and divorced after discovering her husband of 12 months was maintaining 7 other girlfriends behind her back.

== Career ==
She married Geoff Barker, formerly "Commando" from the Australian version Gladiators, and together they started Australia's first Body Model agency, focusing on all shapes and sizes. They cast for film, TV and print including characters in Moulin Rouge!, Mission: Impossible 2, The Matrix, and Star Wars. Originally the agent for Sofía Vergara from Modern Family, and Rachael Taylor of Transformers. She also acted in Fat Pizza and Pizza TV series, both Australian TV shows.

Created in the Image Pty. Ltd. T/as Bardots Bodies was placed into Administration in November 2001. Bessie moved from modelling into business and media starting up BubbleMedia PR and Movers Shakers which is Australia's first celebrity contact broker. She also hosts her own show on the Australian Arena television channel.

Bardot is an Australia Day ambassador, Make a wish ambassador and has completed three tours to the Middle East to entertain Australian troops. She was a national radio host with Austereo, a professional public speaker, and CEO of the Movers Shakers celebrity contact brokers firm.

She has also appeared regularly as a social commentator on various TV and radio shows, including The Late Date Show on 2Day FM, to speak on topics such as women's issues and relationships, and has a weekly "agony aunt" segment on national radio.

In 2009 Bardot and her husband gave away all their possession to the needy in a random act of 'kindness' and reinvention they named the "life change experiment". Given away was nearly a million dollars of possessions including cars, jewellery, designer clothing and handing over their businesses to their employees.

Bardot lectures on personal branding, women in business, health, well-being, drive, organisation, motivation and relationships.

Bardot is also an award-winning, best-selling author of three books:

- Casting Couch Confidential – an exposé on the modelling industry
- Bessie's Body Secrets – a guide to weight loss and well-being for women
- Bessie's Guide For Girls Who Want More From Life – offering advice for women in business

In 2007, she became the host of a burlesque talent show TV program, alongside her then husband as a judge on the show. In May 2011 Sydney-based author, Amanda Cole, issued Who Needs Prince Charming?, a self-realisation book for women, which collated contributions from 35 Australian women including Bardot, Bianca Dye, Camilla Franks, Kathryn Eisman, Molly Contogeorge, Tania Zaetta and Cindy Pan.
