= SBS Monday comedy slot =

Time slot on the SBS television schedule in Australia

The SBS Monday comedy slot was part of the schedule of Australian state broadcaster SBS dedicated to off-beat, often offensive comedy programming, often produced by SBS itself and usually the highest rating night on SBS TV.

Prior to 2013, programs aired between 8:30 and 9:30pm Monday nights, after Top Gear and before SBS World News Australia. During the summer non-ratings period, it aired after Top Gear Australia. As of 2014, the slot is currently filled with programs of other genres, and much comedy programming is screened on SBS Two.

== Programs aired ==
- Bro'Town
- Broken News
- Chappelle's Show
- Crank Yankers
- Drawn Together
- Garth Marenghi's Darkplace
- Gerhard Reinke's Wanderlust
- Housos
- John Callahan's Quads!
- John Safran vs God
- John Safran's Music Jamboree
- Life Support
- The Mighty Boosh
- Pizza World Record
- Rex the Runt
- Song for the Socceroos
- South Park
- Speaking in Tongues
- Stella Street
- Strangers with Candy
- Stripperella
- Swift and Shift Couriers
- Velvet Soup
