= John Boxer (Australian actor) =

Australian actor

- Born: John Boxer; 18 August 1959 (age 67); Australia
- Occupations: Actor (television and film) voice artist
- Years active: 1984 – present

John "Johnny" Boxer is an Australian television and film actor and commercial voice-over best known for his role as Bobo Gigliotti in Pizza.

== Early life ==
He grew up in Campsie, New South Wales and attended Belmore Boys High School, where he excelled in his studies as well as in athletics, cross-country, and water polo.

== Career ==
Boxer worked as a brick layer at Bondi Pavilion before being spotted by casting agents at an Eastern Suburbs pub in the ‘80s. He has appeared in E Street, Pizza, Fat Pizza, Water Rats, Home and Away, and FINK! and has done voice-overs for various commercials, including for the Australian Cricket Team. He recently finished filming Smooth Criminal featuring fellow Australian actor Michael Bray.

== Works ==
=== Filmography ===
Year	Movie
1984	Over Exposed
1994	Cody: The Tipoff
1997	Dangerous Pizza (short)
2000	The Goddess of 1967
2003	Fat Pizza
2005	Meat Pie
2005	Fink!
2006	The Ancient Rite of Corey McGillis (short)
2006	Solo
2008	The Plex
2009	A Model Daughter: The Killing of Caroline Byrne
2009	Dark Horse (short)
2010	Hobby Farm
2011	Bedlam (short)
2012	Short Beach
2012	Mutiny (short)
2014	Fat Pizza vs. Housos

2014 Son Of A Gun

=== Television ===
- Water Rats (as Bouncer, S01E04 & as Commando #1, S04E20) (1996, 1999)
- Pizza (as Bobo Gigliotti) (2000–2007)
- The Potato Factory (as Hobart Trooper) (2000)
- Home and Away (as Hoon, S13E12) (2000)
- Pizza Live (as Bobo Gigliotti) (2004)
- World Record Pizza (as Bobo Gigliotti) (2006)
- The Da Vinci Cup (as Bobo Gigliotti) (2006)
- Two Twisted (as Bill, S01E09) (2006)
- Australian Families of Crime - Carl Williams: Baby Faced Killer (as Mick Gatto, S01E01) (2010)
- Swift and Shift Couriers (as Bobo Gigliotti, S02E05) (2011)
- Underbelly: Badness (2012)
- Housos (as Bobo Gigliotti, S02E04) (2013)
- Fat Pizza Back In Business (2019, 2021)

=== Stage ===
- Pizza: The Stage Show (as Bobo Gigliotti) (2002)
