= Chequebook journalism =

Practice of news reporters paying sources for information

Chequebook journalism (American English: checkbook journalism) is the controversial practice of news reporters paying sources for their information. In the U.S. it is generally considered unethical, with most mainstream newspapers and news shows having a policy forbidding it. In contrast, tabloid newspapers and tabloid television shows, which rely more on sensationalism, regularly engage in the practice. In Britain and throughout Europe, journalists paying for news is fairly common.

Among the reasons cited for why it is unethical to pay a source, one is that it can easily affect the credibility of the information the source provides. Since paying a source creates a legal business relationship, it can also affect a journalist's ability to remain objective. The payments are typically for exclusive rights to publish personal information or obtain an interview, which for some news events, leads to bidding wars among the media for access. It also creates a potential conflict of interest by the publisher, whose neutrality should always be protected. Or it may give the source an incentive to embellish or exaggerate, and even fabricate details, since part of the bargain with the reporter is to provide them interesting and valuable information.

In the past, chequebook journalism became an issue after certain news events regarding celebrities and politicians, as they earn the publication substantial income. The promise of high profits makes them more willing to pay for information. Past examples include stories about Michael Jackson, Bill Clinton, O. J. Simpson, Princess Diana, and Richard Nixon, where sources were sometimes paid millions of dollars for interviews. Defenders of the practice consider news information to be a commodity, which a source has a right to sell to a reporter for the highest price, in the same way the publication sells its news to the public. When payments to a source became disclosed to the public, however, it has even undermined court cases, as when witnesses admitted they had been paid for providing confidential information to the press about the case.

Some hazards of chequebook journalism have become more common, as the practice has made celebrities and politicians a lucrative target for tabloids, and a form of public voyeurism which attracts viewers. In situations where a source has been paid for making unproven allegations against a public figure, the mere publication of a story about it has damaged numerous careers, regardless of whether the alleged offense actually took place. A number of well-known journalists, such as Walter Cronkite, have suggested forcing disclosure of any payments to be part of the news story.

== Definition ==
Chequebook journalism is the practice of paying money or other consideration to news sources, usually people, by reporters or news agencies, in exchange for the right to publish their story in a newspaper, magazine or on television. The rights purchased are often for exclusive rights, thereby allowing only a single news publisher the right to reproduce, edit, resell, televise, or use the story as they choose. The practice may include having the source grant an interview and provide personal and private information.

== Controversial issues over its use ==
The Society of Professional Journalists (SPJ), an organization formed to maintain high ethical standards of behavior in the practice of journalism, states that journalists should not pay for access to news. Their guidelines also suggest being wary of sources offering news information for compensation. By avoiding paying for news, according to the SPJ, journalists will be able to act independently, avoid bidding for news, and will prevent any conflict of interest. Competition for getting a story does not give a journalist license to cross ethical boundaries.

Most news outlets disapprove of paying for news or else ban the practice outright as a policy. Among the reasons for those policies, according to Andy Schotz, chairman of the SPJ's ethics committee, is that paying for an interview immediately puts the credibility of the information they provide in doubt. In addition, paying sources creates a legal business relationship, thereby casting doubt on the reporter's ability to maintain total objectivity, with no bias. As such, it can lead to a conflict of interest when publishing news stories. Journalism should strive to remain neutral and unbiased, according to journalism expert Roy Peter Clark.

There are two reasons why mainstream news organizations are absolutists about refusing to pay news sources. One is ethical. When you pay someone to tell a story, its value goes up with its sensationalism. This is an encouragement to embellish, exaggerate or outright fabricate. The other reason is self-serving. It would establish a precedent of paying for something that has been free.

— TV/radio writer, Tom Jicha

The controversial aspects of chequebook journalism have been debated by those strongly against the practice and those who support it, at least in certain situations. For example, the imprisonment in 2016 of Tara Brown and Stephen Rice, considered two of Australia's finest reporters, came about during production of a 60 Minutes story concerning the recovering of abducted children. In supporting such payments on occasions, such as that one, an editor with The Daily Telegraph notes that "sometimes there are individuals who simply won’t speak without being paid."

Schotz suggests full disclosure by news publishers, one that their readers or viewers will understand. He states, "If there's a conflict of interest, then what should come next is explaining it in detail, letting viewers know you had a separate relationship other than just that of a journalist and a source." Schotz's advice for aspiring journalists:

Don't pay for interviews. Don't give sources gifts of any kind. Don't try to exchange something of value in return for getting a source's comments or information or access to them. Journalists and sources shouldn't have any other relationship other than the one involved in gathering news.

Walter Cronkite likewise suggested that journalists should be forced to disclose the amount of any payment given to sources. That would include incorporating that detail in printed stories and on televised news programs. Some newspapers or TV shows have taken the step of raising the issue of how much money was paid to the source by a competing media, and publishing the amount paid, with the goal of casting doubt on their competitor's version of the story. That methodology was apparent when A Current Affair announced a new policy of no longer paying for stories, and blowing the whistle on competitor shows that do. (Note: Producer Bob Young explained the show's plan to "blow the whistle" on other shows that pay their sources: "If there is an interview that we know some other show, be it network or syndicated, paid for, we'll still do the story – but we'll say, 'We wanted to get so-and-so's opinion, but he wanted $10,000 to speak to us ... and Hard Copy paid it.'")

In at least one court case, the simple refusal by the person alleging an injury to answer whether or not they were paid by a publisher for their story, helped undermine their credibility and contributed to their case being lost.

There are some journalists and publications which have defended the practice of chequebook journalism. Among their rationales are that information is a commodity, giving the source an ownership or property right to their story; that since the news publication earns money from the story, the source has a right to a share of it; (Note: Greg Easterbrook, a Newsweek editor, explained one rationale: "I don't see why professional reporters should be the only ones to profit from producing news. We in the press seem to think [people] should surrender their privacy and submit to our embarrassing questions so that we can make money off it.") that the source has a right of privacy over their story, which they can sell if they choose; that a source should be rewarded for their time in being interviewed; or that payments received by the source can be used to cover their legal fees or other expenses related to the story.

=== Tabloids versus mainstream media ===
The exchange of money or other consideration in return for news information has been practiced in small and big ways, both good and bad. While chequebook journalism has historically been used by tabloid newspapers, it has more recently been used by major news organizations or agencies along with the mainstream media. It has led to the creation of a "culture of checkbook journalism," according to the Columbia Journalism Review, where some tabloid newspapers willingly pay for stories about scandals, and where some journalists now assume they should pay for gossip: "Once money enters the reporting equation, it has the potential to corrupt the whole journalist/source relationship," states the Review.

What begins with a free-lance reporter giving information about Michael Jackson to Channel 4 TV immediately becomes a global pursuit of the decade, one luring the hordes of Fleet Street and all the other global blood sniffers. Awaiting them here are U.S. print and TV tabloids and the "legitimate press," and soon this pride of competing big cats and their scavenging tag-alongs are hunting en masse, one indistinguishable from the other... In the tabloids, it doesn't matter if it's true. If you've got someone to say it's true, that's what matters.

— Howard Rosenberg
Los Angeles Times writer and TV critic

Chequebook journalism became a national controversy in 1994 after it became public that the National Enquirer, a tabloid newspaper, had offered to pay $1 million for an interview with O. J. Simpson's friend Al Cowlings, before Simpson's murder trial. The paper also found the clerk who sold Simpson the knife allegedly used, and paid the clerk $17,000 for the information. Iain Calder, former European editor of the Enquirer, said that his paper pays well for tips about celebrities' private lives.

During Simpson's trial, the judge admonished all attorneys to keep their witnesses away from the press to protect the "integrity" of their testimony. When the judge learned that Hard Copy and Star tabloids paid a future witness an estimated $100,000 to be interviewed, she eliminated the witness from the trial, potentially affecting the outcome of the case. The hounding of witnesses by the media led California Governor Pete Wilson to immediately sign a bill which henceforth made it illegal for witnesses and jurors in criminal trials to sell their stories until the case is finished. (Note: Violating the law was a misdemeanor, punishable by up to six months in jail, and a fine of up to three times the amount of money they received. The authors of the law, Senator Quentin Kopp and Assembly Speaker Willie Brown, stated that the sale of information contaminates the right to a fair trial by providing an incentive to lie. They also said that a paid witness could lose credibility to a jury.)

Howard Kurtz is among many journalists who states that paying for news stories, which he says was "essentially invented by the London tabloids," raises questions about their credibility. And writer Andrea Gerlin adds that the circulation wars among British newspapers has over the years led to rounds of "media witch-hunts, checkbook journalism, and intrusive stories about celebrities." In 2012, it was disclosed that reporters and editors at The Sun, a UK tabloid, had for years paid hundreds of thousands of dollars to police officers, along with a "network of corrupted officials" in the military and the government, to inform the paper about scandals. "They also cast a harsh spotlight on the freewheeling pay-for-information culture of the British media," noted the New York Times.

Newspaper columnist Art Buchwald said that "the days of cheap news are over, and now all the players have agents." Consequently, newspapers which engage in chequebook journalism have to put up a lot more money than they used to. The witnesses in the Michael Jackson scandal were charging more to tell their story to the media than he was paid to give a concert. "Freedom of the press is much more costly than the public realizes."

=== Lowered journalism standards ===
Chequebook journalism has existed in the U.S. for over a hundred years. In 1912 The New York Times paid a wireless operator on the Titanic $1,000 for his story; Life magazine paid the seven Mercury astronauts for their stories in the 1960s. Such payments were not necessarily in cash, as when Hearst newspapers paid the legal bills for the man who kidnapped Charles Lindbergh's son in 1935 in order to get his exclusive story. In 1995, ABC gave Michael Jackson a series of free ads on Prime Time Live, valued at $1 million, promoting his new album on the same week they interviewed him. Although cash is still the best way to buy stories, says TV reporter Don Rey, who first reported the Jackson case: "When the Jackson scandal broke, the British hacks on Fleet Street were loading up on airplanes with bags stuffed full of money to buy whatever information they could."

Although much of the mainstream media opposes any form of payment to news sources, they often will try to compensate their sources indirectly with non-cash benefits, which allows them to claim they did not pay for a story. Such indirect methods may include referring to sources as "consultants," covering sources' travel costs, arranging accommodations and covering meal costs, paying for local transportation, arranging their entertainment; and doing so for the source, their family and even friends.

The key issue is disclosure. If you pay for it, say so, so the viewer can draw whatever inferences are appropriate about the veracity of what the paid source is saying.

— Jerry Nachman,
former vice president of MSNBC news

According to David Shribman of the Boston Globe, until recently, reporters treated allegations against individuals, including political officials, in much same way: They sought to verify the allegations before putting them into print. Generally, they were made public only after they had been made part of a court record, usually a lawsuit or criminal complaint. In recent years, however, unsubstantiated or unofficial allegations made to a reporter can gain "almost immediate coverage," says Everette Dennis, formerly executive director of the Media Studies Center at Columbia University. And "once it appears someplace the traditional media feel perfectly free to pick it up. That’s a lower standard than we used to have," he said.

Mike Bass, executive vice president at CNN, also noted a future of lowering standards when he wrote that the "whole notion of checkbook journalism stinks. You start paying a few people for their stories, and everybody will insist on compensation. Where will it stop?" In Britain, the weekly magazine OK! not only pays celebrities for interviews, it lets them review and approve all photos and articles before being printed. And in the U.S., news magazines are known to offer similar deals with celebrities in order to get exclusive interviews. Newspaper editor David B. Cooper has acknowledged the dangers of paying for stories:

The frantic, competitive ratings race in television has spawned a wave of awful stuff passing for journalism. Fairness and substance have been eroded by the tabloid style of what I would call celebrity journalism, in which anything goes so long as it might titillate viewers. If the sources of news are going to be paid by those who report the news, the sources will soon learn to say anything to make a more sensational story.

TV networks in the past have paid for interviews with such prominent figures as Sirhan Sirhan, William Calley, G. Gordon Liddy and Alexander Solzhenitsyn. In general, the networks are united in principle that paying for news stories is a dangerous practice and one that could lead to a competition based on how much a news organization could afford to pay for news.

Nonetheless, most American journalists oppose paying sources for stories. In one poll only 17 percent of journalism students said they would ever consider paying for an interview. The general public likewise opposes the practice when they are aware of it, as less than a third considered it ethically acceptable. Many news organizations, such as the Los Angeles Times and The New York Times forbid the practice as part of their official code of ethics.

Tom Bigler, vice president of WBRE-TV, offered his opinion: "I assure you, checkbook journalism is absolutely something we will never take part in. In fact, our station wouldn't give a nickel for a story. Checkbook journalism is fundamentally wrong. It’s simply not proper to ethical journalism. We would never, never, never stoop that low. I know of networks that have done it time to time and they always come to regret it." News directors of other Pennsylvania TV stations echoed the same sentiments.

=== Acceptance of its use in Europe ===
The practice of paying news sources has been ongoing in Europe and Britain since about the 1850s. According to journalist Neville Thurlbeck, the British press has been practicing chequebook journalism for over 160 years. Related to this was a British "phone hacking scandal" dating back to 2002, during which it was learned that for years there had been illegal phone hacking, police bribery, and the exercising of improper influence in the pursuit of news stories. The hacking focused on celebrities, politicians, and members of the British royal family.

Many criminal trials were tainted when such payments were made or even promised. In one case, the UK tabloid The News of the World promised a young girl $25,000 if the man she accused of sexually molesting her was convicted; her testimony was the key evidence.

And chequebook journalism has also prevented the public from reading news about major world events. One such event was the birth of the world's first test-tube baby in 1978, which took place in a London hospital. A frantic bidding war began among newspapers for the exclusive right to interview the parents, doctors and the hospital staff. The competition was won by the Daily Mail, after they agreed to pay the parents $600,000. A similar bidding war took place in London in 1996, with the birth and subsequent death of octuplets. The mother received up to an estimated $1.55 million for giving the tabloid, News of the World, exclusive rights to interviews. (Note: Roger Gale MP called the deal "quite revolting and quite improper and ... the worst kind of checkbook journalism.")

The difference is attitude in Europe toward chequebook journalism was made apparent in 1999, when ABC did not pay Monica Lewinsky for an interview with Barbara Walters. That was in accord with its policy of not paying sources. However, for an interview Lewinsky gave to a British TV company at about the same time, she was paid $660,000 and promised additional amounts from foreign sales. "The Brits apparently don't fret over journalistic purity like the colonists do," said TV writer Tom Jicha.

According to journalism scholar Ron Smith, about two-thirds of British journalists accept the practice of paying news sources. And throughout Europe, government officials require "honorariums" before they will grant interviews. In the realm of European sports, tennis and soccer stars typically receive large payments for discussing their game with reporters. While those who have had affairs with sports stars receive large payoffs to be interviewed, as when Sky News paid $200,000 to a woman who made that claim regarding soccer player David Beckham. (Note: Sky News would not deny a claim that it paid $2.2 million Cdn for an interview.) In Eastern Europe and Russia, it's been common practice for government officials to be paid before discussing newsworthy events. When, for example, the Soviet Union collapsed in 1991, officials were demanding cash up front for access to news sources and sites. (Note: Moscow police was charging foreign journalists up to $1,000 a day to film any police work.)

=== Targeting celebrities and politicians ===
The hunt for sexual sins must stop. Washington is not Hollywood. The current obsession with transgression is corrosive, immoral and dangerous ... Sexual McCarthyism will know no bounds ... Americans don't like this. New polls show that most Americans don't want to have the hidden sexual dalliances, including adultery, of political leaders bruited about... Eventually, we will get tired of trashing our leaders. In the meantime, the damage to individuals and the further decline of respect for politics will be costly burdens. Only the self-righteous and holier-than-thou may run.

— Ann McFeatters
Washington syndicated columnist

Critics of chequebook journalism say the danger is prevalent among the famous by turning celebrities and politicians into lucrative targets, a complaint leveled by attorneys representing Bob Barker, who was fighting sexual harassment accusations. Ken Perkins of the Calgary Herald describes such targeting of politicians and celebrities with sexual allegation stories as the "new voyeurism." Donald Trump pointed out that someone asserting "a mere allegation" of such behavior could destroy the lives of those accused, since due process is ignored. "This thriving tabloid culture has erased the old definitions of news: Tawdry stories about celebrities are no longer confined to the supermarket papers," wrote media author Howard Kurtz.

In some situations, when payments to witnesses or story sources became known, it has undermined actual court cases. For example, when in 1991 a woman alleged that William Kennedy Smith had sexually assaulted her, the story made national news primarily because Smith was the nephew of Senator Edward Kennedy. According to one account, during the trial the "spectators gasped" when a friend of the alleged victim testified that television show A Current Affair had paid her $40,000 for two interviews, that a British tabloid, Globe, offered her $100,000, and that the National Enquirer offered her $450,000 plus 50% royalties for exclusive rights to her story. Another woman who became a witness, and was also paid by A Current Affair to be interviewed, admitted later that she really knew almost nothing about the alleged assault as she had only met the claimed victim that evening.

Information brokers, celebrity attorneys, and third-party news agencies, have become sub-industries for assembling news stories for distribution to the media. Most will accept and try to sell clients' stories to numerous publications and keep a percentage of what they receive as their fee. However, unlike news organizations, they will seldom question the facts submitted by customers and will not independently verify their accuracy or truthfulness. Actress Kirstie Alley publicly offered to pay any tabloids for the names of people who leak personal information about celebrities to reporters: "Those sleazeballs who write this crap are so slimy they'll gladly inform on their informants for money," she said.

The timing of stories has sometimes become an issue, as when the scandal affecting Clinton's campaign manager, Dick Morris, was published shortly before the presidential election, which severely damaged Clinton's chance of winning. Or when Republican candidate for governor, Jon Grunseth, was forced to drop out a few days before the election, due to the publication of unproven allegations concerning conduct which took place nine years earlier. He claimed that his Democratic opponent "was the driving force" behind the allegations, which he noted were "absolutely false." It was learned afterwards that one of the women who made the allegations had called his daughter and told her that "no other allegations would be made against him" if her father would drop out of the governor's race.

Regardless of the effect on journalistic standards, payments for stories have reached the highest levels of politics. The New York Times notes that newsmakers who have received large payments include not just witnesses in court cases like the Casey Anthony and O. J. Simpson trials, but former presidents. It adds: "Evolving standards or no, checkbook journalism has been a persistent and problematic feature of news coverage at even the most powerful and reputable news organizations, long predating the hyper-competitive 24-hour cable news cycle and the celebrity gossip boom. And the issue is not likely to disappear anytime soon..."

Cal Thomas, a syndicated columnist, explained that the British press, under both Labour and Tory governments, have been paying for news stories for years. He wrote that "Fleet Street was built on cash for gossip. [While] American media are slightly more sophisticated in pursuing 'exclusive' stories."

=== Conflict of interest ===
The Society of Professional Journalists (SPJ) Ethics Committee condemned the actions of ABC, NBC and CNN in their use of chequebook journalism, when they were bidding for an interview with Tonya Harding, after a figure skating controversy. Harding was paid about $600,000 for her interview in 1994 with tabloid TV show, Inside Edition. In reaction, one editor wrote that "the networks are putting 'For Sale' signs on their ethics, their integrity and their objectivity."

The SPJ committee said news organizations that pay for sources, for whatever reason, develop an "ownership" interest in these stories. As a result, the public can legitimately question a news organization's credibility and doubt whether its reports are fair and accurate. At the very least, claims the SPJ, news organizations should state up front what they've paid for access and what agreements they've made with a news source. "It's legitimate to question whether sources are telling the truth or embellishing the story a little to earn their paycheck. . . The fact is, that checkbook journalism isn’t really journalism at all."

"Tabloid shows disturb me. Paying for news stories disturbs me," said Bob Edwards, former host of National Public Radio's Morning Edition. "It disturbs me that once you pay a person, you have an investment in them, and you may not treat them the same. You may not have the same scrutiny for truth that you may have had before." Similarly, former NBC News president Larry Grossman discredited the practice, calling it a "sad reflection of the tabloidization of even network news." Years later, Grossman had also commented when it was disclosed, during a murder trial, that ABC had given $200,000 to the suspect. He felt that such a hidden payment could undermine the network's trustworthiness, integrity, and honesty of reporting.

The Encyclopedia of Journalism states that the problem with paying sources for news stories is that the sources will have a natural temptation to embellish or exaggerate their description of events. Since they are being paid, sources may feel obligated to keep the story interesting. When the public learns that the sources of news were paid, however, they often consider the information as being tainted, a mere commodity which was purchased, and thereby less credible. That change of opinion can easily affect the credibility of the news organization or the entire profession.

=== American Media Inc. and National Enquirer ===
On April 22, 2024, former American Media Inc. head David Pecker acknowledged that the National Enquirer engaged in a practice of checkbook journalism which involved paying sources for stories, and that he "gave a number to the editors that they could not spend more than $10,000" and he had final say over celebrity stories. He also acknowledged that "checkbook journalism" served as part of the editorial philosophy he followed when ran American Media Inc. Pecker stated that he believed that “The only thing that is important is the cover of a magazine.”

== Notable examples ==
=== Michael Jackson case ===
What started as a legitimate news story in 1993, the sexual molestation allegations against singer Michael Jackson, quickly turned into a media circus after a number of tabloid television shows began buying story rights. "If you want to turn a carnival side show into a main event," said Thomas Lennon, producer of Frontline, "you take a big name and drag it through the mud. . . The story was bought and changed as people cut deals for information. The tabloids set the pace, and the mainstream media followed. . . Competition drives people toward tabloid journalism,” he said. "It drives production standards up and editorial standards down." Lennon added that the tabloid reporters "used paid sources, an existing network of informants, and the skills honed by years of digging for celebrity dirt... One thing you can say about money journalism is it gets the information flowing fast."

People come to us every single week and say they have a great story about Michael Jackson, or whatever, and my client wants to be paid. They're shopping around. The well has been poisoned.

— Landon Jones
People magazine, managing editor

Jackson's attorneys said that such "cash-register journalism" had "transformed the culture of reporting into a profit-driven enterprise that leaves traditional news organizations in the dust, and likewise turns celebrities into lucrative targets." According to Washington Post writer Howard Kurtz, "this thriving tabloid culture has erased the old definitions of news by including tawdry and sensational stories about celebrities, for the sake of profit." He notes that immediately after sexual allegations against Jackson were publicized, although no proof was given, it drew heavy coverage from numerous major newspapers, and made the cover of countless magazines.

"That coverage," said Kurtz, brought forth a number of "Jackson aides and hangers-on with palms outstretched." They included his former maid, who sold her story to Hard Copy. Then two of Jackson's bodyguards were paid $100,000 for interviews with Hard Copy. Jackson tried to undermine their credibility by pointing out they were "paid witnesses." Other members of the press, especially in London, tried to pay Jackson's domestics, lawyers and so-called psychology experts, to get exclusive inside personal details. "Their actions start out as hard nosed journalism and disintegrate into frantic payoffs," said David Fanning, the British executive producer of Frontline. He noted that "the irony here is that the tabloids covered a legitimate news story, but the evidence has been adulterated by money changing hands."

=== Bill Clinton ===
During Bill Clinton's 1992 presidential election campaign, Gennifer Flowers, a nightclub singer and former state government worker in Arkansas, was paid an estimated $100,000 for her story in a weekly tabloid, where she claimed to having a 12-year long affair with him, which he denied. She continued to sell her affair story to other print media and television tabloids, earning an estimated $500,000 by 1998. Soon after, other reporters were being contacted by women who said they were "willing to invent stories" of having had an affair with Clinton if they were paid enough.

In the opinion of columnist David S. Broder, "the press has no obligation to go rummaging in the closets of White House contenders for any past indiscretions that may fall out. It is terribly difficult to resolve the issues of motivation, evidence and conflicting recollection that attend such past relationships – and politicians are easily victimized by people seeking to settle old scores." Broder said that after 20 years in politics, details about Clinton's private life and old girlfriends should be less relevant as a news story than the public understanding his political accomplishments.

Political journalist John Seigenthaler said he observed that the press was moving more and more into accepting unchecked and unsubstantiated hearsay about sexual allegations against public figures. While Molly Ivins, a syndicated columnist, said that "anyone with a pecuniary or political motive for destroying someone else’s reputation was suspect, especially "charges made by sources with an ax to grind." And as another editorial stated, "One other reason the mainline media jumped into the adultery story with no evidence beyond the tales of a paid-for informant is that 'sex sells.' And it is an easy sell." It adds:

Folks who wouldn't sit still for a one-minute explanation of Clinton's education policy are glued to the tube for a 10-minute interview on alleged adultery... And once a story jumps from the pages of the tabloid to a national television interview it takes on a life of its own. It is pack journalism in action.

=== Dick Morris ===
Star tabloid published a story about Dick Morris, who was Bill Clinton's campaign manager, that he had been involved with a prostitute. The story seriously affected the final session of the Democratic National Convention in 1996. It led to his discontinuing work on that campaign just two months before the election.

Morris resigned after the story was subsequently also published by the New York Post. He called the published allegations "sadistic vitriol" and "yellow journalism." Some Democrats accused the Post of engaging in a political ploy, which the paper denied. In any case, the story "exploded in a town full of reporters who haven’t had anything to write for three weeks," said CNN reporter Bruce Morton, "so we pounced on it."

Speculations soon followed that the timing of the release of that story was "no accident," but was carefully planned by Star to have "maximum effect." It was learned that the woman had been trying to sell the story of her ongoing affair to Star for over a month before it was published, and Star helped her plan a trap to get photos of them on a hotel balcony. She received $50,000 for the story.

Star's editor, Phil Bunton, acknowledged that they paid the prostitute for her information and cooperation. He later said that "if it was just ‘Dick Morris slept with a hooker,' I don’t think it would have gone anywhere. It would have been a non-story." It was apparent that the tabloid wanted the story out before the convention ended. ABC-TV’s Brit Hume called the story a "body blow to the president." In 1992, the Star also broke the story about Clinton's alleged affair with nightclub singer Gennifer Flowers, and had reportedly paid her $150,000 for that story.

=== Al Gore ===
Former Vice President Al Gore was cleared of allegations that he inappropriately touched and assaulted a masseuse in 2006. Among the reasons the court denied the allegations were true were that she and her attorney had refused to answer questions about whether she was paid for making the allegation. And because it was commonly known that the National Enquirer, which first published her allegation, had a practice of paying for such stories, the district attorney assumed that she had been compensated. She also failed a polygraph examination about her allegations.

=== Princess Diana ===
Daily Mirror editor Piers Morgan described his bidding war for an account by Princess Diana's butler, Paul Burrell, about his work for her. Burrell was offered up to $1.6 million by various tabloids, and accepted $500,000 from the Mirror. Its circulation jumped 300,000 copies a day during its series of articles. Ironically, Burrell was subsequently attacked by those same losing tabloids for cashing in by revealing Diana's most intimate secrets.

Publishers and editors of British newspapers subsequently pledged to abide by a new code, as a result of Princess Diana's death, which lays down rules about privacy, harassment and buying stories.

=== Others ===
==== U.S. ====
- Richard Nixon: CBS paid about $500,000 for the right to excerpt 90 minutes out of 38 hours of videotaped "conversations" with Nixon.
- H. R. Haldeman, convicted as part of the Watergate scandal, demanded to be well compensated before he gave an interview for 60 Minutes. He received $100,000 for his hour-long interview in 1975 with host Mike Wallace, who admitted later that paying for the interview was "a bad idea."
- CNN paid $10,000 to a plane passenger for an interview and a photo. The Dutch citizen had overpowered Umar Farouk Abdulmutallab on a flight from Amsterdam to Detroit before he could detonate a bomb.
- In 1989, New York Post reporter Bill Hoffmann flew to Bermuda to interview Janet Culver, who had miraculously survived 14 days at sea in a rubber raft. When he arrived at the hospital, Hoffmann was told that People magazine had bought exclusive rights to her story for $10,000.
- After the second Rodney King trial, a number of jurors demanded to be paid for giving interviews.
- After the Columbine High School shootings, a friend of one of the gunmen was paid $10,000 by the National Enquirer for information about the killers. ABC paid him another $16,000 for an interview on Good Morning America. (Note: Tom Goldstein, the dean of Columbia University's Graduate School of Journalism, commented about those interviews: "It makes us uneasy that somebody is profiting from the misfortune of others, but that's what a lot of journalism is about.")
- Larry Flynt, publisher of Hustler magazine, placed a full-page ad in The Washington Post in 2007 offering $1 million to anyone who would provide evidence of an illicit affair among any high-ranking Washington officials. The careers of at least two officials were damaged as a result.
- Bill Cosby: According to court records, Autumn Jackson, the alleged Cosby daughter from his affair with Shawn Thompson, had contacted a tabloid newspaper threatening to sell her story if Cosby didn't pay her $40 million. (Note: Cosby contacted the FBI to investigate the extortion scheme, which led to a trial. Others who know Jackson were also negotiating deals with tabloids. Neighbors of Autumn Jackson can, according to a newspaper editorial, "probably make some big bucks by spinning yarns to tabloids . . enough motivation to fabricate a story." One writer claims that crucial details about many similar stories, especially high-interest celebrity cases, "are supplied by people who have a motivation to lie by providing sensational accounts.")
- Jamie Lynn Spears was paid $1 million by British tabloid OK! to do a story about her pregnancy.
- Brad Pitt and Angelina Jolie received $4.1 million from People magazine for family photos with their newborn daughter in 2006.
- Jennifer Lopez and Marc Anthony were paid $6 million by People magazine for photos of their twins in 2008.
- Mary Jo Buttafuoco was reportedly paid $500,000 for interviews by A Current Affair TV show.
- NBC News paid a six-figure fee for interviews with survivors and their amateur footage of an aerial accident.

==== Australia ====
- 1985: the Nine Network paid Lindy Chamberlain $250,000 for the exclusive rights to her story.
- 1991: James Scott received A$250,000 for his story about being lost in the Himalayas for 43 days
- 1995: Bob Hawke and Blanche d'Alpuget received A$200,000
- 1997: the Seven Network paid rescued British solo yachtsman Tony Bullimore A$100,000 for his story about being trapped in his overturned vessel in the Southern Ocean.
- 1997: the Seven Network paying Stuart Diver A$250,000 for his story about the Thredbo landslide in 1997
- 2005: the Ten Network paying Douglas Wood A$400,000 (and promising "some control over the final program") for his story about being kidnapped and held hostage in Iraq
