= Sunday (Australian TV program) =

- Also known as: The Sunday Program
- Genre: News/Current affairs
- Presented by: Jim Waley; Jana Wendt; Ellen Fanning
- Theme music composer: Geoff Harvey
- Composer: Geoff Harvey
- Country of origin: Australia
- Original language: English
- No. of seasons: 27

Production
- Executive producer: Allan Hogan Stephen Rice John Lyons
- Producers: Peter Hiscock, Paul Steindl, Marianne Latham, Catherine Hunter, Peter Thompson, Sarah Turner, Kathryn Franco, Nick Farrow, Alexandra Ware (Hind).
- Production locations: Sydney, Australia
- Cinematography: Les Seymour, Peter Shepherd
- Editors: Michael Connerty, Cindy Kelly, Jacinta Goringe, Damien Quinn
- Camera setup: Single and multi-camera
- Running time: 120 minutes

Original release
- Network: Nine Network
- Release: 15 November 1981 – 3 August 2008

Related
- Nine Sunday Morning News; Weekend Today

Sunday is an Australian current affairs, arts and politics program, broadcast nationally on Sunday mornings on the Nine Network Australia. The program covered a range of topical issues including local and overseas news, politics, and in-depth stories on Australia and the world, plus independent film reviews, independent arts features, and independent music reviews. Its final show aired on Sunday, 3 August 2008.

== History ==
The announcement of the launch of the private and independent breakfast television and Canberra-produced politics program on 22 October 1981 inspired controversy, as it was then practice to fill the spot with religious programming. The advent and ongoing success of Sunday was a significant milestone in Australian television, as it for the first time offered a credible alternative/rival to the dominant influence of the ABC's flagship current affairs program Four Corners, which had premiered 20 years earlier. Sunday was often referred to as the "baby" of network boss Kerry Packer, although rival media outlets have characterised it as "an expensive indulgence".

The first edition of Sunday aired on 15 November 1981, presented by Jim Waley who hosted the show for the next 20 years and became synonymous with the program. When not on duty, the program was hosted by Helen Dalley, a well regarded reporter. Sunday differed from Four Corners in several key respects; at the time Sunday premiered, a typical Four Corners episode ran for 40–45 minutes (without interruption) and rarely presented more than one story per week. By contrast Sunday ran for two hours (including ad breaks) with a wide-ranging magazine-style format. Each episode typically opened with a news roundup presented by Waley, followed by a selection of short feature stories, an in-depth political interview by Nine's political editor Laurie Oakes, a "headline" investigative feature with in-depth coverage of a major story, a movie review by film critic Peter Thompson (the adoptive brother of actor Jack Thompson), and a general-interest 'colour' piece (presented during the later years of the show by actor-writer Max Cullen). For many years, each show usually concluded with a musical segment, often featuring a visiting overseas performer or group.

Waley continued as host until December 2002, when he left the show to take over from the retiring Brian Henderson as Sydney presenter on National Nine News. He was replaced as Sunday host by former A Current Affair host and reporter Jana Wendt. Following the decision to change Sunday's successful magazine format, it was revealed on 1 September 2006 that Wendt would resign from the program, with both Ross Greenwood and Ellen Fanning to take over as joint presenters of the show.

During the Ross Greenwood and Ellen Fanning era, Sunday was considered to be a program made up predominantly of hard news and current affairs stories, particularly when compared to Seven's Weekend Sunrise, which, as of 2018, continues to air on Sunday mornings.

Following the appointment of John Westacott as the Nine Network's chief of news and current affairs, it was announced that from 16 September 2007 that former A Current Affair host Ray Martin would replace Greenwood as joint host of the program with Fanning. Prior to the 2008 return of Sunday, it was announced that the program would return with a new and earlier timeslot of 7.30 am. After the announcement, Martin suddenly quit the Nine Network after 30 years. He was not replaced and Fanning remained as the solo host.

Until 2006, the program was modelled after another Sunday morning program with a similar format from the United States – CBS News Sunday Morning.

=== Brand extension ===
After the initial success of Sunday, an edition was produced from 1986 called Business Sunday, hosted by Ali Moore. Business Sunday was committed to comprehensive coverage and quality reporting of business, economic and financial issues affecting Australia and the world. However, after 20 years of the program on Australian television, the Nine Network decided to merge Sunday and Business Sunday from 3 September 2006.

== Hosts ==
Tenure	Host/s
November 1981 – December 2002	Jim Waley
February 2003 – September 2006	Jana Wendt
September 2006 – November 2007	Ellen Fanning and Ross Greenwood
November 2007 – February 2008	Ellen Fanning and Ray Martin
February 2008 – August 2008	Ellen Fanning

=== Alumni ===
A significant number of Australian journalists, media professionals, researchers and producers were involved in Sunday between 1981 and 2008. Among these are reporters and presenters: Seven News's Adrian Brown, former NSW premier Bob Carr, Ross Coulthart, actor Max Cullen, Sky News Australia's Helen Dalley, Graham Davis, the late Robert Haupt, Laurie Oakes, Hugh Riminton, Sarah Ferguson, Paul Ransley, film reviewer/writer Peter Thompson and ex-National Nine News anchor Jim Waley. Producers, researchers and media professionals include: Peter Hiscock, Allison Langdon, Tom Krause, Ann Buchner, Nick Farrow, Kathryn Franco, Kirstine Lumb, Adam Shand, Karen Tan, former Seven News chief Peter Meakin, Paul Steindl, arts specialists Catherine Hunter and Marianne Latham, political/media adviser Sarah Turner and long-time executive producer Stephen Rice.

== Awards and accolades ==
Sunday has won several awards, including gold and silver medals from the New York Festivals television awards in 2002, for its coverage of East Timor and investigation of cover-up claims regarding Governor-General, Peter Hollingworth. In 2003, Sunday was awarded the "Most Outstanding Public Affairs Program on Australian Television" Logie Award.

== Firsts ==
Under progressive Executive Producer Stephen Rice, Sunday achieved number of firsts including being the first Australian 'newscaff' program to launch its own website in 1997 and promote on-air URLs to viewers. Working with the online producer Kathryn Franco, anchor Jim Waley introduced Australian television viewers to the web for the first time when he said "...And you can read a transcript of Laurie Oakes' Interview shortly after the show at our ninemsn website..." or “Visit our website at ninemsn for more information.” Having been the Producer for Peter Thompson’s Film Reviews and researcher on some investigative stories since 1994, Franco began to write the Internet links each week for Waley. She transferred and produced encoded videos to be published onto the website of selected segments each week, and published news articles. It’s believed to be one of the first examples of video and news publishing and it was largely manual. When Nine created its joint venture with Microsoft to become NineMSN, Franco moved to the new NineMSN staff team having been recommended by Rice to PBL head Daniel Petrie. She was the only television staffer to join NineMSN and other programs to go online from Nine would be staffed by new recruits, many from Fairfax. To place the Sunday program online weekly, she would travel between the offices of Nine at Willoughby, and NineMSN in Paddington with video tapes, splitting her time in each place. She was in contact with journalists in ABC America and MSNBC in the US to develop the video ingestion processes, and used Microsoft Workbench for publishing. The sister shows she’s worked on at Nine: "Business Sunday" and "Small Business Show" followed with their own sites which she developed. In the early years of NineMSN, all three Of the sites were among the few which had profitable advertising due to the strong traffic from loyal television audiences and premium advertising that would be sold as a packages by NineMSN and Nine sales teams. Franco later became a Webby Award Winner for another video platform, attending and accepting the award in New York the same year as Stephen Colbert.

== Cancellation ==
On 25 July 2008, Sunday and Nine's late news program Nightline were both cancelled by the network. The final broadcast went to air on 3 August 2008. The reasons for the axing of Sunday included both poor ratings outside of the east coast and budgetary constraints as part of Nine's news and current affairs brand.

== Final broadcast ==
The final episode of Sunday was aired on 3 August 2008 from 7:30am–9:30am. It was hosted by Ellen Fanning. It included the return of long-time and founding host Jim Waley, former Nine Network host and former co-host Ray Martin, current political editor Laurie Oakes, and appearances by former reporters Charles Wooley (from 60 Minutes), Ross Greenwood (also a former co-host) and Jennifer Byrne. Peter Thompson also made an appearance, reflecting on past film reviews.

A special "live crossover" between Channel 9 and pay TV news channel Sky News Australia occurred, with an interview with former reporter Helen Dalley, who now works at Sky News.

Jim Waley went on to present the last Canberra interview by then current Prime Minister, Kevin Rudd, who in an interview with Laurie Oakes, expressed his regrets at the show's final departure.

Before looking at the archived memories, the broadcast ended with a final goodbye with both Jim Waley and Ellen Fanning thanking all Australian viewers for their support over the past 2½ decades, with the emails, faxes and phone calls made to the Nine Network in protest over Sunday's axing.

After the final show, former and current Sunday staff gathered for a final farewell function at the Union Hotel in North Sydney. In an interview published the following day in The Sydney Morning Herald, Ray Martin criticised Nine's decision to shelve the series indefinitely:

"(It says) we're (Nine is) not serious about news and current affairs. If you want your serious stuff go to the ABC ... Sunday is part of the Nine brand ... so you can't just look at the bottom line ... Of course you have to make money, but how do you put a price on quality? ... I think, from a business point of view, it's dopey, really dopey."

"The perception is that we're (Nine is) not serious about news and current affairs. Maybe that doesn't fit the business strategy, that's fine, but don't whinge when we don't get the ratings we want. Don't whinge when the station's not worth the kind of money it should be worth. They're killing the golden goose.".

A photo taken at the wake featured a group that TV Tonight's David Knox described as "legends of Australian TV journalism": Ray Martin, Ellen Fanning, Stephen Rice, Laurie Oakes, Jim Waley and (Seven's) Peter Meakin. The photo by Bob Pearce which appeared in that day's The Sydney Morning Herald "would almost win a Walkley itself", Knox said.

One week later after the final bulletin, Sunday's Ninemsn website was removed.

== See also ==
- List of Nine Network programs
- List of Australian television series
- List of longest-running Australian television series
