= Stephen Rice (journalist) =

Australian journalist

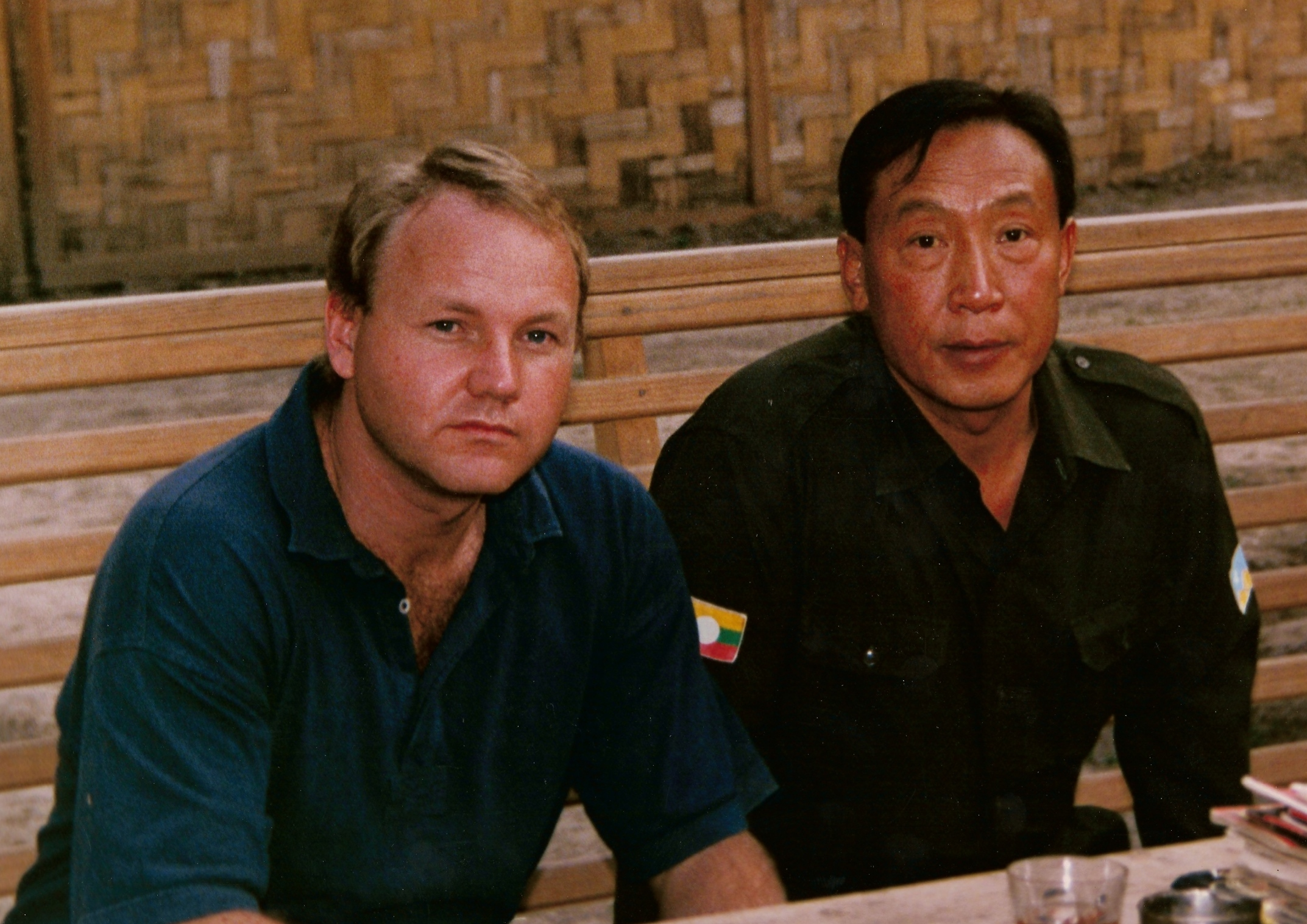
- Khun Sa with Stephen Rice, pictured in Khun Sa's jungle headquarters in Burma, April 1988
- Born: 15 August 1957 (age 69); Duisburg, West Germany
- Occupations: Journalist, author and television producer

Stephen Rice (born 15 August 1957) is an Australian journalist, author and television producer.

== Career ==
Rice began his career in journalism with the investigative newspaper, The National Times, after graduating from the Australian National University in 1981 with degrees in law and arts. He joined The Sydney Morning Herald in 1984, covering national and state political and legal affairs. He was hired by Channel Nine's Willesee program in 1984 with a brief to investigate corruption in New South Wales. He became executive producer of A Current Affair in 1992.

He was appointed executive producer of the Nine Network's news and public affairs program Sunday and its sister show Business Sunday, in 1994 and ran both programs for ten years until 2004. He was also executive producer of the Nine Network's The Small Business Show.

In 2000 he was executive producer of The Dream Factory, an eight-part documentary series about young Australian actors trying to make their careers in Hollywood.

Rice is the author of the controversial Some Doctors Make You Sick: The scandal of medical incompetence. The book caused an outcry in the medical profession as Rice called for more injured patients to sue their doctors – and provided them with a comprehensive how-to guide to do it.

He has won numerous national and international television and journalism awards, including a Gold Medal in the New York Festivals Awards in 1998 for Saddam's Missing Billions, an international investigation (with Sunday host Jim Waley) into the Iraqi dictator's hidden fortune. He has twice won Walkley Awards for journalism: one for an exclusive interview with the Golden Triangle (Southeast Asia) heroin warlord Khun Sa in 1988 (a report he filmed himself on a Video 8 camera after illegally crossing the Burmese border by donkey); and the inaugural Walkley award for Excellence in News Leadership, in 1997.

He has been a vocal opponent of privacy laws which seek to restrict the rights of the media, particularly the use of cameras in public places or which purport to ensure freedom of information but actually prevent it.

He has spoken about the tension in current affairs television between chasing strong ratings and chasing strong stories: "Our credibility has a commercial value and we are in danger of squandering it."

Rice’s decade-long battle to keep Sunday as a serious public affairs program is featured in Gerald Stone’s insider account of Channel Nine, Compulsive Viewing. His removal as executive producer – and the subsequent reversioning of the program to what Stone describes as a "happy chat" format – is examined by Stone in his 2007 sequel Who Killed Channel 9? Other senior Sunday staff – and host Jana Wendt – were later also removed by management. The program was axed in August, 2008.

From 2004 to 2016, Rice was a senior producer at 60 Minutes (Australian TV program).

=== Beirut Arrest ===
In April 2016, Stephen Rice, Tara Brown and seven other people (including two other staff members of the Nine Network, David Ballment, and Ben Williamson) were arrested on allegations of child abduction in Beirut while covering the story of Sally Faulkner, an Australian woman attempting to regain custody of her two children. Lebanese judicial sources told The Guardian that the group were to be charged with "armed abduction, purveying threats and physical harm" – crimes which carry sentences of twenty years imprisonment with hard labour. The four journalists were released on bail two weeks later. Consequently, on 27 May 2016, Rice left Channel Nine. On 1 July 2016 criminal charges against the four were dropped. Rice was subsequently reported to have received a substantial settlement from Nine over his departure from the network. From 2017 to 2019 Rice was a senior producer on the Seven Network's Sunday Night program.

=== Current ===
Since October 2020, Rice has been NSW Editor of The Australian.
