= Gerald Stone =

Australian news producer (1933–2020)

Gerald Stone AM
- Born: Gerald Louis Stone; 18 August 1933; Columbus, Ohio, United States
- Died: 6 November 2020 (aged 87)
- Citizenship: United States (birthplace), Australia^{[explain status]}
- Occupations: Television and radio journalist, television executive, author
- Years active: 1957−2010

Gerald Louis Stone AM (18 August 1933 – 6 November 2020) was an American and Australian television and radio journalist, television executive, producer and author.

== Early years and career ==
Born in 1933 and raised in Columbus, Ohio, Stone graduated in political science from Cornell University and in 1957 started work as a copy boy for The New York Times. In 1962, he emigrated to Australia and commenced as a journalist for News Limited, working as a foreign correspondent in Vietnam in the late 1960s, and also covered the Australian Moree "Freedom Rides" for the Daily Mirror and Sunday Mirror. Between 1995 and 1998, Stone was editor-in-chief of The Bulletin.

Moving into television in 1967, he first appeared on ABC TV's This Day Tonight as a reporter before being appointed a news director for the Nine Network in 1975. While at the Nine Network, he was in East Timor in August 1975 when the Balibo Five were shot. According to The Daily Telegraph, "... [Stone] went to Dili with Kerry Packer and cameraman Brian Peters, one of those later killed." Further, it was reported that "Mr Stone said he and Mr Peters came under fire and Nine boss Mr Packer's voice could be heard on tape shouting: 'Come back.'"

Stone was the inaugural executive producer of the Australian version of the newsmagazine 60 Minutes, first aired in 1979. Given the job by Packer, he was told: "I don't give a f... what it takes. Just do it and get it right." Packer was less than impressed with the opening show, telling Stone: "You've blown it, son. You better fix it fast." Over the years, Stone's award-winning 60 Minutes revolutionized Australian current affairs reporting and enhanced the careers of Ian Leslie, Ray Martin, George Negus, and, later, Jana Wendt.

Stone also served as head of current affairs for Rupert Murdoch's Fox Network in New York and returned to Australia to take up the position of network head of current affairs for Channel 7. Stone was appointed as a director of SBS on 1 December 2000 and reappointed for a further five years in 2005, serving in the role as deputy chairman until December 2010.

Stone was made a Member of the Order of Australia (AM) in the 2015 Australia Day Honours "For significant service to print and broadcast media as a journalist, editor, television producer and author."

Stone died on 6 November 2020, aged 87.

== Published works ==
- War Without Honour. Brisbane: Jacaranda Press. 1966. p. 154.
- Compulsive viewing: the inside story of Packer's Nine Network. Ringwood, Victoria: Viking. 2000. p. 536. ISBN 0-670-88690-4.
- Singo : mates, wives, triumphs, disasters. Pymble, NSW: Harper Collins. 2002. p. 346. ISBN 0-7322-7423-0.
- 1932: A Hell of a Year. Sydney: Pan Macmillan Australia. 2005. p. 429. ISBN 1-4050-3677-X.
- Who Killed Channel 9?: the death of Kerry Packer's mighty TV dream machine (hardback). Sydney: Pan Macmillan Australia. 2007. p. 292. ISBN 978-1-4050-3815-7.
