= Planet America =

Australian television news program

- Genre: Politics of the United States
- Presented by: John Barron; Chas Licciardello; Melina Wicks
- Country of origin: Australia
- Original language: English
- No. of series: 7
- No. of episodes: 289

Production
- Running time: 30 minutes (2012–17); 43 minutes (2018–19); 30 minutes (2020); 54 minutes (2021)

Original release
- Network: ABC Television
- Release: 10 February 2012 – present

Related
- China Tonight; The Drum; India Now; One Plus One

Planet America and its sister program Planet America's Weekend Edition (formally known as Planet America's Fireside Chat) are Australian television news and current affairs programs on ABC Television. The program, which launched in February 2012 ahead of the 2012 United States presidential election, is focused on United States politics, and is co-hosted by John Barron and Chas Licciardello. As of November 2024 one episode each of Planet America and Planet America's Weekend Edition are aired on ABC TV, ABC News channel, and ABC iview.

== History ==
Planet America premiered on 10 February 2012. The program was launched to cover American political news events ahead of the 2012 presidential election.

The program continued airing weekly after the 2012 election, covering the week's news in American politics.

In 2017, the Planet Extra series was created, with episodes uploaded to Planet America's Facebook page. In 2018, Planet America's time slot was increased to 45 minutes.

In 2020, the program was moved to the prime time slot of 9.30pm on Wednesdays on the primary ABC TV channel with a half-hour runtime. Planet America's Fireside Chat, a spin-off show, premiered on 31 January 2020 on ABC News on Fridays at 8pm with a 45-minute time slot. The spin-off was renamed as Planet America's Weekend Edition at the beginning of 2025. The Planet Extra Podcast started on 14 February 2020, hosted by Chas Licciardello and Dr. David Smith.

In 2021, the main show was moved to Fireside Chat’s timeslot, and extended to run for just under an hour. It started at 7:03pm (after ABC News Update) and consisted of four sections: a general American news section, an interview with a guest, a report by John Barron, and the Fireside Chat. Barron's reports, as well as extended versions of multiple interviews, would generally be available on ABC iview and the "ABC News In-Depth" YouTube channel individually (i.e. separate from the main show), as well as being included in the full broadcast. Towards the end of the season, with no more guests to be interviewed, Barron was joined by Gavin Wood to present Countdown-style rankings of the best and worst Presidents of the United States.

John Barron confirmed on Twitter that the 2022 season of Planet America would begin on 26 September, delayed by the funeral of Queen Elizabeth II. It was due to begin sometime in August, for the 2022 US midterm elections, but was later pushed back to September.

In the meantime, the co-hosts have been working on other projects for the ABC, such as The Context with John Barron: a news analysis show during (what would have been) Planet America’s timeslot hosted by Barron, starting from June. There was also a Planet America Special that aired on July 22 after The Context for the Capitol Riot hearings.

In November 2024, Planet America was confirmed to be returning in 2025 at the annual ABC Upfronts event.

From 4 August 2025, Planet America will air on Monday nights, moving from Wednesday following the cancellation of Q+A.

== Description ==
The program is co-hosted by John Barron, and Chas Licciardello (The Chaser),

As of November 2024 one episode each of Planet America and Planet America's Fireside Chat are aired on ABC TV, ABC News channel, and ABC iview.

== Similar programs ==
Other programs similar to Planet America have been created out of its popularity, such as China Tonight (from 2021; with Stan Grant and Yvonne Yong) and India Now (from 2022; with Marc Fennell).

== Episodes ==
=== Planet America ===
Series	Episodes	Originally released	
Series	Episodes	First released	Last released
2012	46	10 February 2012	7 December 2012
2013	18	22 January 2013	24 May 2013
Special		6 November 2015	
2016	42	29 January 2016	18 November 2016
2017	49	20 January 2017	22 December 2017
2018	45	2 February 2018	18 December 2018
2019	42	1 February 2019	13 December 2019
2020	42	22 January 2020	18 November 2020
2021	41	20 January 2021	3 December 2021
2022	11	27 September 2022	21 November 2022
Special		22 July 2022	
2023	11	4 August 2023	15 December 2023
2024	44	31 January 2024	27 November 2024
2025	79	17 January 2025	28 November 2025
2026	TBC	2 February 2026	TBC

=== Planet America's Fireside Chat ===
Series	Episodes	Originally released	
Series	Episodes	First released	Last released
2020	42	31 January 2020	20 November 2020

=== Planet Extra ===
Series	Episodes	Originally released	
Series	Episodes	First released	Last released
2017	24	29 July 2017	15 December 2017
2018	9	27 July 2018	14 December 2018
2019	36	1 February 2019	13 December 2019

=== Planet Extra Podcast ===
Series	Episodes	Originally released	
Series	Episodes	First released	Last released
2020	50	14 February 2020	20 November 2020
2021	42	27 January 2021	17 December 2021
2022	19	26 August 2022	28 November 2022
2023	29	29 July 2023	24 December 2023
2024	52	19 January 2024	30 November 2024
2025	61	25 January 2025	4 December 2025
2026	TBC	8 February 2026	TBC
