= Andrew Olle Media Lecture =

Lecture created to honour Andrew Olle

The Andrew Olle Media Lecture was established in 1996 by the presenters and staff at 702 ABC Sydney (formerly 2BL) to honour the memory of ABC Radio and television broadcaster Andrew Olle, who died in 1995 of a brain tumour. It focuses on the role and future of the media.

== Lecturers ==
The Andrew Olle Lecturers have been:

- 1996: David Williamson, Australian playwright
- 1997: Jana Wendt, Australian television journalist
- 1998: John Alexander, former editor-in-chief of The Australian Financial Review and The Sydney Morning Herald
- 1999: Steve Vizard, Australian writer and producer, chairman Granada Australia
- 2000: Eric Beecher, chief executive of Text Media, former editor of The Sydney Morning Herald
- 2001: Kerry Stokes, executive chairman of the Seven Network
- 2002: Lachlan Murdoch, chairman of News Limited, deputy chief operating officer of News Corporation
- 2003: Harold Mitchell, CEO and chairman of Mitchell Partners
- 2004: Chris Anderson, board member of Publishing and Broadcasting Limited, former chief executive of Optus
- 2005: John Doyle, Australian actor, comedian, writer
- 2006: Senator Helen Coonan, Minister for Communications, Information Technology and the Arts
- 2007: John Hartigan, chairman and chief executive of News Limited
- 2008: Ray Martin, Australian television journalist
- 2009: Julian Morrow, Australian actor, comedian, member of The Chaser
- 2010: Alan Rusbridger, editor of The Guardian newspaper, media innovator
- 2011: Laurie Oakes, Australian print and television journalist
- 2012: Mark Colvin, Australian radio journalist
- 2013: Lisa Wilkinson, presenter of Today, former Cleo editor
- 2014: Kate McClymont, investigative journalist for The Sydney Morning Herald
- 2015: Helen McCabe, editor-in-chief of The Australian Women's Weekly magazine
- 2016: Waleed Aly, writer, commentator, broadcaster, academic, and co-host of The Project
- 2017: Joseph Kahn, managing editor of The New York Times
- 2018: Caroline Wilson, former chief football writer of The Age
- 2019: Peter FitzSimons, author and columnist for The Sydney Morning Herald
- 2020–21: Not held due to the COVID-19 pandemic
- 2022: Ita Buttrose, ABC Chair, author and founding editor of Cleo
- 2023: Leigh Sales, Australian journalist and author, presenter of Australian Story
- 2024: Fran Kelly, radio presenter, current affairs journalist, and political correspondent
- 2025: Geraldine Doogue, radio presenter and current affairs journalist
- 2026: Alessandra Galloni, editor-in-chief of Reuters
