= Ross Greenwood (journalist) =

British journalist (born 1959)

- Born: 29 June 1959 (age 67); Australia
- Occupations: Political analyst; print and TV journalist; radio presenter; author; talk show host
- Spouse: Tanya
- Children: 1

Ross Greenwood (born 29 June 1959) is an Australian print and television journalist and radio presenter, reporting on business and finance.

== Personal life ==
Ross lives in Sydney, married to Tanya and has a son named Mitchell

== Media career ==
In January 2021, Greenwood joined Sky News Australia as Business Editor.

Preceded by Jana Wendt	Sunday; Host with Ellen Fanning; 2006	Succeeded by Ray Martin
