= Ellen Fanning =

Australian journalist

- Born: Ellen Mary Fanning; 8 September 1967 (age 58); Brisbane, Queensland, Australia
- Education: Queensland University of Technology
- Occupations: Journalist; TV presenter; radio presenter; reporter; international correspondent; writer; producer
- Known for: Association with Nine Network and Australian Broadcasting Corporation

Ellen Mary Fanning (born 8 September 1967) is an Australian journalist.

Fanning currently hosts the Drive program on ABC Radio Brisbane.

She was previously host of The Drum on ABC TV and ABC News Channel and the Nine Network's Sunday television program.

== Career ==
Fanning started a career in commercial radio in 1988, after graduating with a communications degree from the Queensland University of Technology. She later joined the ABC, presenting the ABC Radio National national current affairs program PM for two years, AM and occasionally The 7.30 Report on ABC TV.

After a stint producing the ABC's late-night current affairs program, Lateline, she was appointed one of the North America correspondents for the ABC network in 1997, based in Washington, D.C.

In 2000, Fanning moved to the Nine Network, working first as a reporter with 60 Minutes, then as a reporter for A Current Affair, before becoming a substitute presenter for A Current Affair and Today. In 2005, she became presenter of Nightline, replacing Helen Kapalos.

Fanning wrote and directed a six-part documentary series titled Fine Line for SBS TV in 2002. The series dealt with the ethical questions of journalism.

In 2006, Fanning became co-host of Sunday with Ross Greenwood, who was then replaced by Ray Martin in 2007. Martin left the Nine Network in 2008, leaving Fanning as the sole host of the program, alongside Michael Usher presenting the news and Stephanie Brantz presenting the latest sports news.

In 2013, Fanning hosted the 20-episode series The Observer Effect on SBS TV, and from September 2014, became the presenter of ABC Classic's Classic Breakfast, having replaced Ed Le Brocq.

In 2017, Fanning returned to ABC TV to become host of The Drum, a role she shared with Julia Baird. She remained in the role until the show was axed in December 2023.

In November 2024, ABC announced that Fanning will host the Drive program on ABC Radio Brisbane starting in 2025.

== Personal life ==
Fanning was born in Brisbane, Queensland, and attended All Hallows' School. She is married with two sons.

Preceded by John Barron	The Drum; Co-host with Julia Baird; 2017–2023	Succeeded by Program ended
Preceded by Jana Wendt	Sunday; Co-host with Ross Greenwood and Ray Martin; 2006–2008	Succeeded by Program ended
Preceded by Helen Kapalos	Nightline; Presenter; 2005–2006	Succeeded by Michael Usher
