= John Barron (Australian journalist) =

Australian journalist

- Born: July 8, 1971 (age 54)
- Occupation: Television presenter
- Known for: Planet America

John Barron (born 8 July 1971) is an Australian journalist and television presenter. He works for the Australian Broadcasting Corporation, after having worked previously at the Sydney radio station 2GB as a producer and journalist.

== Career ==
Barron began his career at Sydney radio station 2GB in 1991, working as a producer for presenters such as Malcolm T. Elliott and Clive Robertson before joining the Macquarie newsroom as a journalist and newsreader. In 1994, he returned to 2GB programs as a talkback presenter on overnights and evenings. He left in 1996 to resume his studies, before taking a job as a journalist with the Special Broadcasting Service, Grundy Television and later the ABC.

Barron was a presenter on the ABC's NewsRadio network from 1998 to 2012, hosting national programs including the breakfast and drive shows, covering major news stories, including the 9/11 attacks on the United States, and presenting The Annual Report—a quiz where listeners had to guess what year events occurred. It was later released commercially on CD by the ABC.

Barron hosted ABC Fact Check segments from August 2013 until 2016, as well as hundreds of episodes of the ABC news program The Drum, between 2011 and 2023.

In 2012, Barron, with Chas Licciardello, co-created and co-hosts the US politics program Planet America. From 2022, Barron presented The Context with John Barron on ABC, and he has written articles for ABC News on American politics and the presidency of Donald Trump. His analysis has also appeared in American publications such as The Washington Post and The Seattle Times.

Barron has written and presented documentary programs for ABC radio including The Beatles in Australia (2004) and The Day The War Ended (2005), and for television First Stop, Iowa (2008), The Party of Reagan (2012), Madhouse Mess (2013), Fly Me to the Moon (2019), The Bug; Y2K Remembered (2020) and 9/11 Stories (2021).

Barron is the author of three books, Vote For Me about the history of US presidential campaigns, and two books of political fact checks, Is That a Fact? and Completely Fact!.

Also at the ABC, Barron has guest-presented programs including Lateline, News Breakfast, 7.30 and Media Watch, and appeared on entertainment programs Media Circus, The Hamster Wheel and The Checkout.

Barron worked as a research associate and later honorary associate at the United States Studies Centre at the University of Sydney, creating and teaching a Masters Course with former U.S. presidential speechwriter and author James Fallows, and academic Nicole Hemmer.

Barron frequently appears on commercial TV, including The Project, and radio as an analyst of American politics.
