= Harold Mitchell (media buyer) =

Australian businessman (1942–2024)

Harold Charles Mitchell AC (13 May 1942 – 10 February 2024) was an Australian businessman, media buyer, philanthropist and humanitarian.

== Life and career ==
Harold Mitchell was born in Trafalgar, Victoria on 13 May 1942, one of four children. His father was a sawmiller who had to go wherever the work was. His mother left the marriage when he was 15. By the time Harold was 16, the single-parent family was living in Stawell, Victoria. He left school early and worked in the local sawmill for some months and then went to work for an advertising agency in Melbourne, a city he had only ever visited once. He studied part-time at RMIT.

Mitchell became a successful media buyer, founded his own company, and led the development of the media buying industry in Australia.

Mitchell was the Executive Chairman of the Mitchell Communication Group and Executive Chairman, Aegis Media Pacific, part of the Aegis Group. He was also involved in Television Sydney.

In 2000, he created the Harold Mitchell Foundation, which donates money to various causes promoting community health and the arts.

Mitchell was the chairman or board member of various organisations including the Florey Institute of Neuroscience and Mental Health, the New York Philharmonic, the National Gallery of Australia, the Museum Board of Victoria, Opera Australia, CARE Australia, the Melbourne Symphony Orchestra, Tennis Australia, the Deakin Foundation, the Melbourne International Festival of Arts, and the Australia-Indonesia Centre.

Mitchell was a champion of sport, helping to ensure the long term viability of soccer in Australia. In 2010 he became co-owner of the Melbourne Rebels rugby union team.

Mitchell was a major promoter of Australia overseas, such as in bringing Australian Indigenous art to millions worldwide.

His personal challenges included alcoholism and obesity. He was a teetotaller since he was 23, and shed 70 kilograms before his 70th birthday.

In July 2020, Mitchell was found by the Federal Court of Australia to have breached his duties as a director of Tennis Australia by providing confidential information to the Seven Network in the awarding of television rights for the Australian Open in 2013.

His autobiography Living Large appeared in 2009. Mitchell died on 10 February 2024, at the age of 81.

== Prominent appearances ==
Harold Mitchell presented the 2003 Andrew Olle Media Lecture. Mitchell addressed the National Press Club on 1 September 2009. On 28 June 2010, Mitchell appeared on the ABC television program Q&A.

== Honours ==
In the Australia Day Honours of 2004 Harold Mitchell was made an Officer (AO) of the Order of Australia, "For service to the community, particularly as a benefactor and fundraiser in support of artistic and cultural endeavour, and to business through advertising and media interests".

In the Queen's Birthday Honours of 2010, he was appointed a Companion (AC) of the Order of Australia, then Australia's highest civilian honour, "For eminent service to the community through leadership and philanthropic endeavours in the fields of art, health and education and as a supporter of humanitarian aid in Timor-Leste and Indigenous communities".

Mitchell was a 2013 National Finalist in the Australian of the Year awards.
