= Look Me In The Eye (TV series) =

Australian television series

Look Me In The Eye is an Australian reality television documentary series on SBS. The series features estranged family members, friends and colleagues sit down face to face for five minutes without speaking a word and cameras capture what happens next. It is hosted by Ray Martin and produced by Endemol Shine Australia the series is based on a UK format developed by CPL Productions.

== Participants ==
- Anyang, who was a prison guard in South Sudan and tortured the younger Ayik under orders from rebel warlords.
- Sue and Garry, a separated couple who were married for 33 years but drifted apart 3 years ago.
- Mick, who walked away from the family when daughter Shelley was 10.
- Jenny, who was born and raised in a strict Chinese culture, who felt her son Carl, 19, was too young to move in with his girlfriend.
- Eduardo, who wants to reveal the truth about his sexuality to his former best friend, Haylee.
- Taylor and Tynan, whose close relationship fell apart when their parents divorced.
- Sherrie and Bindi, whose friendship was challenged by mental struggles.
