= Nightline (Australian TV program) =

1992–2008; 2009–2010 Australian TV series

- Created by: Nine News
- Starring: Jim Waley (1992–2001); Hugh Riminton (2001–2004); Helen Kapalos (2004–2005); Ellen Fanning (2005–2006); Michael Usher (2006–2008); Wendy Kingston (2009); Kellie Sloane (2009–2010)
- Country of origin: Australia
- Original language: English
- No. of seasons: 18

Production
- Running time: 30 minutes

Original release
- Network: Nine Network
- Release: 24 June 1992 – 25 July 2008
- Release: 30 November 2009 – 2 July 2010

Nightline is an Australian late-night news bulletin television program produced by Nine News for Nine Network. Introduced in 1985 as a five-minute late-night news summary before becoming a thirty-minute bulletin in 1992, it was cancelled in 2008, then was brought back in 2009, before it was cancelled again in July 2010. It aired at around 11:30 pm on weeknights, but was not shown in Perth or Adelaide. Nightline was previously presented by Kellie Sloane. Its main competitors were Ten Late News and ABC News's Lateline, both of which aired prior to Nightline at 10:30 pm.

The program was named after the version which airs on ABC (US), that however was a late night current affairs program, rather than a news bulletin.

== History ==
In 2007, Nightline was also broadcast at 10:30pm on Nine HD, an hour before it was broadcast on Nine SD. This only lasted for a short period of time, however.

Nightline was axed on Friday 25 July 2008 due to budget constraints as part of Nine's news and current affairs division. Wendy Kingston presented the final edition.

In May 2009, during the major expansion to the Nine News brand, Nine's Late News bulletin was re-introduced into the 11:30pm time slot left vacant by Nightline. Nine's Late News, presented by Wendy Kingston, was first broadcast on Monday 4 May 2009.

In November 2009, Nine's Late News was re-launched as Nightline. However, after declining audience numbers due to increasing sporting commitments with televising Friday night NRL (in the northern states) and Wimbledon in June 2010, the Nine Network permanently retired Nightline. It was replaced with sporting telecasts and more "youth" programming that is borrowed from sister networks GO! and GEM, including the continuing of national-produced comprehensive half-hourly news updates presented by reporters who are on shift and is produced from the Willoughby news studios, if reporters are from Melbourne, Brisbane, Adelaide or Perth must travel to Sydney to present the news updates. Nine offered Kellie Sloane a redundancy package.

=== Presenters ===
At the time of Nightline's 2010 axing, the presenters were:

- News: Kellie Sloane
- Weather: Jaynie Seal (Fridays)

At the time of Nightline's 2008 axing, the presenters were:

- News: Michael Usher (Monday to Thursday) and Allison Langdon (Friday)
- Sport: Stephanie Brantz
- Weather: Jaynie Seal and Mike Bailey

The past presenters of Nightline are:

- 1992–2001: Jim Waley – former Sky News Australia presenter, now retired
- 2001–2004: Hugh Riminton – now with 10 News First.
- 2004–2005: Helen Kapalos – now a freelance journalist, and currently the Chairperson of the Victorian Multicultural Commission.
- 2005–2006: Ellen Fanning – now ABC Radio Brisbane presenter.
- 2006–2008: Michael Usher – now the Friday and Saturday co-presenter of Seven News Sydney and host of 7NEWS Spotlight.
- 2009: Wendy Kingston – as Nine Late News – reporter and presenter with the Nine Network.
- 2009–2010: Kellie Sloane – now leader of the New South Wales Liberal Party.

Other past fill-in presenters of Nightline included:

- Georgie Gardner – former Nine News Sydney presenter.
- Jennifer Keyte – now 10 News First Melbourne weeknight presenter.
- Helen Dalley – now freelance journalist.
- Leila McKinnon – now reporter and fill in presenter for Nine News and A Current Affair.
- Peter Overton – now Nine News Sydney Sunday-Thursday presenter.
- Ian Ross – deceased, former Seven News Sydney presenter.
- Kim Watkins – now no longer on television.
- Mark Ferguson – now the Sunday – Thursday presenter on Seven News Sydney.
- Sharyn Ghidella – presenter of 10 News First Queensland.
- Allison Langdon – now the host of A Current Affair.
- Mike Munro – now retired.

== Format ==
Nightline consists of news, sport, finance and weather. Reports were sourced mainly from Nine News reports nationwide, but the bulletin sometimes also includes reports from A Current Affair, 60 Minutes and international news services.

== Presentation ==
When Nightline returned in 2009, it was presented from the Today set. However, only one camera angle was used, being the plasma screen showing a live night-time shot of the Sydney skyline. The program was presented from TCN9's "Studio 3". The backdrop is now of the Nine newsroom. The set is also used for the Early, Morning, Afternoon News bulletins.

In 2006–2008, Nightline's opening sequence used the same generic city buildings of the National Nine News opener, except that they were shown at night instead. Nightline also used its own arrangement of the National Nine News theme.

== See also ==
- List of Australian television series
