= Julia Baird (journalist) =

Australian journalist and author (born 1970)

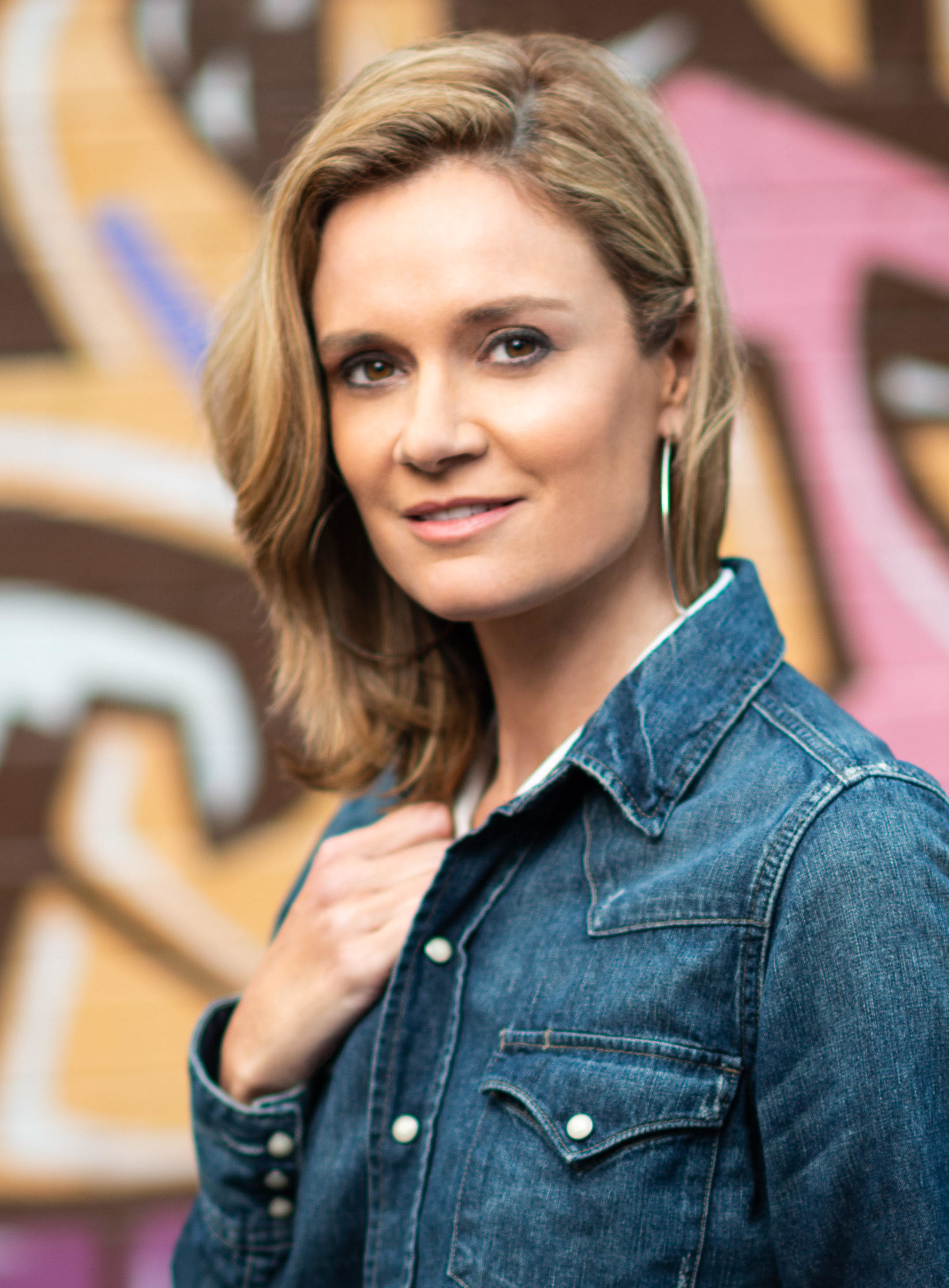
- Baird in 2019
- Born: 19 February 1970 (age 56); Sydney, New South Wales, Australia
- Education: Ravenswood School for Girls
- Alma mater: University of Sydney
- Occupations: Journalist, author
- Years active: 1998–present
- Employer: Australian Broadcasting Corporation
- Television: The Drum
- Children: 2
- Parent(s): Bruce Baird, Judy Baird
- Relatives: Mike Baird, Steve Baird (brothers)

Julia Woodlands Baird (born 19 February 1970) is an Australian journalist, broadcaster and author. She contributes to The New York Times and The Sydney Morning Herald and was a regular host of The Drum, a television news review program on the Australian Broadcasting Corporation (ABC). Her non-fiction work includes a bestselling memoir, a biography of Queen Victoria and a meditation on the experience of grace during a time of dark politics.

== Early life and education ==
Baird was born in Sydney, to Judith (née Woodlands) and Bruce Baird, who would become the deputy leader of the New South Wales Liberal Party. She and her brothers spent their early childhood in Rye, New York, while her father was Australian trade commissioner in Manhattan. After the family returned to Australia in 1980, Baird attended Ravenswood School for Girls. Her HSC results placed her in the top 20 students in NSW. Baird earned a BA degree and later a PhD in history from the University of Sydney. Her honours thesis, titled "Pigeons, Priests and Prophets: the politicisation of women in the Anglican church", examined the campaign to have women ordained in that denomination. Her doctoral thesis was on women in politics and how they are treated by mainstream media. In 2005, she was a fellow at the Kennedy School of Government at Harvard University researching the globalisation of American opinion in the lead up to the Iraq War. In 2018, the University of Divinity made Baird an honorary Doctor of Divinity for her "contribution as a public intellectual to the wider community in the area of religion".

== Journalism ==
Baird began her career as a journalist with The Sydney Morning Herald in 1998, winning her first Walkley Award for her online coverage of the 1998 Australian federal election. By 2000, she was editor of the opinion pages. She also worked as a religious commentator for Triple J and as a freelancer for ABC Radio.

In 2006, Baird moved to the United States and became deputy editor at Newsweek in New York City, working there until it ceased print publication in 2012. She has written for The Philadelphia Inquirer and been a contributing opinion writer for The New York Times. She has written about gender and political topics, such as misogyny in Australian politics, transgender soldiers in the American military and Donald Trump's political strategy. More recently, Baird has written on religious topics, such as suffering and doubt.

Returning from the United States in 2011, she became a host of the ABC radio program Sunday Profile then, in 2012, began presenting The Drum, a weeknight current affairs panel TV show on Australia's ABC TV. The program continued on for another 11 years, with Baird sharing the hosting role with Ellen Fanning and Dan Bourchier, having featured 1,000 guest panelists, before its last show in December, 2023.

In May 2024, Baird returned to radio broadcasting with the launch of Not Stupid; a weekly news review conversation presented alongside Jeremy Fernandez. It appears on ABC RN and podcast formats.

Concern for issues facing women has been a major theme in Baird's work, for which she was recognised with the Edna Ryan Award in 2002. Since 2016, Baird has prepared several in-depth reports on domestic violence in Australia, especially in its connection with religious communities. Her joint reporting for the "Religion and domestic violence investigation" earned four Walkley Our Watch awards, including the Gold Our Watch, in 2018. Baird's reporting on religious minority groups includes an ongoing investigation into the experience of a middle eastern Christian family as they grieve the unexplained death of their daughter at a childcare facility.

== Books ==
Baird is a writer of nonfiction. Her first book was Media Tarts: How the Australian Press Frames Female Politicians and was published in 2004.

In 2010, while living in Philadelphia, she began research for a biography of Queen Victoria for which she was given access to the Royal Archives in Windsor. Random House published Victoria: The Queen in 2016. It was named a book of the year by the literary critics of The New York Times.

Her third book draws on Baird's personal experience of life-threatening illness and "the things that give us comfort, that make us strong". Phosphorescence: On Awe, Wonder and Things That Sustain You When the World Goes Dark was published in Australia in March 2020. The title became a best-seller soon after the COVID-19 pandemic lockdowns began. Phosphorescence was named non-fiction book of the year in the 2021 Indie Book Awards and won both the Book of the Year and the General Nonfiction Book of the Year at the 2021 Australian Book Industry Awards.

Bright Shining: How Grace Changes Everything is Baird's first book to reflect on her exposure to “ugliness in the political realm”, to which she offers a path she calls “moral beauty” or grace. One Sydney Morning Herald reviewed the book as a meditation on the “desire to see, experience and express grace” as "fascinating, wide-ranging and moving." It was shortlisted for the 2024 Nonfiction Indie Book Award and the Australian Book Industry Awards Nonfiction book of the year.

== Personal life ==
Baird's mother, Judy, known for serving prisoners and refugees, died in 2021. Her father, Bruce Baird, was a cabinet minister in the Greiner and Fahey governments before serving in federal politics. Baird's brother Mike Baird, who is 18 months her senior, was the 44th Premier of New South Wales and later became CEO of a Christian aged-care charity, Hammondcare. Her younger brother, Steve Baird, has led International Justice Mission in Australia, an anti modern slavery organisation. She has two children. Along with her parents and siblings, Baird openly identifies as a Christian. Baird has been a strong critic of conservative Christian traditions and has campaigned for the ordination of women in the Sydney diocese of the Anglican Church of Australia.

In 2015, Baird disclosed in her New York Times column that she was recovering from surgery for cancer, one of four bouts with the disease. By 2020 it was in remission.

== Bibliography ==
- Baird, Julia (2004). Media Tarts: How the Australian Press Frames Female Politicians. Sydney: Scribe Publications Pty Ltd. ISBN 1920769234. OCLC 57206438.
- Baird, Julia (2016). Victoria: The Queen: An Intimate Biography of the Woman Who Ruled an Empire. Random House. ISBN 978-1400069880. OCLC 1009844827.
- Baird, Julia (2020). Phosphorescence: On Awe, Wonder and Things That Sustain You When the World Goes Dark. Fourth Estate. ISBN 9781460710890.
- Baird, Julia (2023). Bright Shining: How Grace Changes Everything. Fourth Estate. ISBN 9781460760253.
- Baird, Julia; Baird Sparks, Sam (2026). Becoming a Man: Letters to young men on character and the courage to find your own way. Fourth Estate. ISBN 9781460770375.
