= Helen Dalley =

Australian journalist

- Born: 1957 (age 68–69)
- Education: University of Sydney; Columbia University
- Occupations: TV journalist, reporter and presenter, former magazine journalist
- Employer(s): Nine Network, former Sky News Australia, Publishing and Broadcasting Limited

Helen Dalley (born 1957) is an Australian journalist, who formerly worked for Kerry Packer's Publishing and Broadcasting Limited (PBL) media stable.

Dalley is best known for her work on the Nine Network television programs Sunday, Today and A Current Affair. She has also been a news presenter on Sky News Australia.

== Education ==
Dalley graduated from the University of Sydney with an Arts degree with Honours in French.

== Print media ==
She began her career in the print media. In 1979 she began writing freelance articles, including feature stories on sport for the now-defunct weekly newspaper, the National Times.

A couple of years later she took a job with The Australian Women's Weekly, and Australian Consolidated Press soon sent her to New York. She stayed there for two years, writing for the Weekly, Cleo and Australian Business.

While overseas, Dalley completed a brief, intensive business journalism course at Columbia University before returning to Australia in 1983. Immediately prior to joining Business Sunday, she spent three years with Packer's Australian Business magazine.

== Television journalism ==
In 1986, Dalley became a reporter for the Nine Network's Business Sunday, and in 1989 she joined the regular Sunday program. At various times she has hosted a range of Nine Network shows including Sunday, Today, A Current Affair and Today on Sunday. Dalley was a reporter for Sunday, and occasional host if Jana Wendt was unavailable. She also worked on Nine's Federal Election coverages.

In 2007, Dalley joined Sky News Australia, where she was involved in the expansion of its business programming, as a presenter on the Sky News Business Channel. She also co-hosted Sky News' coverage of the 2007 Australian Federal Election, 2008 Federal Budget night coverage and 2010 Australian Federal Election.

In February 2012, Dalley began presenting National News Sunday on Sky News Australia. Dalley also presented the two-hour program News Now with Helen Dalley on weekday mornings.

In August 2018, Dalley announced her resignation from Sky News Australia after 11 years to pursue new challenges.

== Awards ==
In 1994, Dalley won the United Nations Media Peace Award, for her coverage of the Eddie Mabo story. She received a Media Peace Award commendation in 2002 for a story on refugee children.

In 1996, she won the Michael Daley Award for Excellence in Science and Technology Journalism, for a story on the information superhighway. In 1999, Dalley won a Walkley Award. The judges commended her on her versatility, and for the wide range of stories she has covered.
