= Graham Davis =

Graham Hunt Davis (born 7 October 1953) is a Walkley Award and Logie Award winning Fijian-born Australian journalist. He hosts a weekly Australian television program, The Great Divide on the Southern Cross Austereo TV Network, and is a consultant to the Washington-based global communications company Qorvis on its Fiji account.

== Early life ==
Davis was born in Suva, Fiji, the elder son of the Rev Peter Davis, who served as President of the Methodist Church in Fiji and, later, New South Wales Moderator of the Uniting Church in Australia. He spent his early years on the island of Lakeba in the Lau Group and attended Buca District School, Savusavu, and Drasa Avenue School, Lautoka, before being sent to Newington College, Sydney (1966–1971) as a boarder.

== Radio ==
Davis worked as a journalist in Britain and Australia for the BBC (External Services/World Service News), ABC and the Macquarie Radio Network before moving to television as a news reporter with the Seven Network in Sydney in 1981.

== Television ==
In 1983 Davis joined the Nine Network and the staff of the weekly program Sunday and remained there until 1994. For the next ten years he was an occasional guest reporter for Sunday and worked for Witness on the Seven Network, Dateline on SBS and Foreign Correspondent on the ABC. In 2004, Davis returned full-time to Sunday and remained there until August 2006. He co-founded Grubstreet Media in 2007. The company produced the 2007 and 2008 Asia Pacific Screen Awards and associated programming for Queensland Events and CNN International and conceived the First Australians Business Awards for the Australian Indigenous Chamber of Commerce. It also made television documentaries and commercials. In 2011, Grubstreet produced the national television and cinema campaign "Australian Mining. This is Our Story" for Lawrence Creative and the Minerals Council of Australia. In 2012, Davis was engaged as host of The Great Divide, a weekly political discussion program on the Southern Cross Austereo network (www.thegreatdivideshow.com.au)

== Print ==
Davis is a columnist for the Fiji Sun, the country's biggest selling newspaper (www.fijisun.com.fj).He has written regularly for The Australian and his work has also appeared in The Bulletin, The Sydney Morning Herald, Herald Sun and the Fiji Times. He also writes the blog, Grubsheet Feejee.

== Awards ==
He is the winner of a number of awards including the 1995 Walkley Award for Best Investigative Report for a report on commercial infiltration of the Australian Broadcasting Corporation and a 1994 Logie Award for a story "Ships of Shame", on the parlous state of world shipping. His 2002 report, Silent Witnesses - which detailed cases of child abuse in the Jehovah's Witnesses - won a New York Festivals Award in the US. In 2004 he gained an award from the Australian Council of Deans of Education for the Sunday program "Cash Cow Campuses", which exposed a plagiarism scandal at the University of Newcastle, Also in 2004, he won a National Press Club Excellence in Health Award for the Sunday investigation "Killer Hospitals". He also holds a Michael Daley Award for science reporting.

== Peer assessment ==
Davis has judged the Walkley Awards and Qantas New Zealand Media Awards and was on the national panel that reviewed the Australian Journalists' Code of Ethics.
