= Ian Leslie =

Australian television journalist

- Born: Ian Craig Leslie; 6 July 1942 (age 84); Java, Dutch East Indies
- Occupations: Television journalist, corporate communicator
- Years active: 1962−present
- Known for: 60 Minutes
- Spouse: Jan Leslie
- Children: Jayne Leslie, Peter Leslie

Ian Craig Leslie OAM (born 6 July 1942) is an Indonesian-born Australian television journalist and corporate communicator.

== Early life ==
Ian Craig Leslie was born in Java, Dutch East Indies (now Indonesia). Leslie was born one of twins in Bandung, Indonesia, under Japanese occupation, to his mother Lydia. He had an elder brother, sister and two aunts. At the time, his father William was interned in a POW camp in West central Java and would not see the twins until the Japanese surrender three and a half years later. His father was from Aberdeen, Scotland, and his mother was born in Gnadenfeld, Ukraine. Both migrated from war-torn Europe for a better life in the thriving Dutch-British East Indies. His mother's family was of white Russian origin and fled their homeland to escape persecution under the Communist Bolshevik tyranny.

They raised their four children in Java, where William Leslie was a manager for a large Anglo-Dutch export company. An idyllic life ended abruptly with the Japanese Imperial Army's invasion in February 1942. For his first three years, Ian and his family spent life behind bamboo as POWs in a separate camp to his father. Despite the ravages of prison life and starvation, disease, and lack of medical aid, the Leslies survived. In August 1945, at the end of the Pacific War, the Leslies were evacuated back to Scotland.

In 1947, William Leslie took his family back to Indonesia to resume life and career. What they saw was a very different country to the one they had left three years earlier. Nationalism had replaced Dutch-Anglo colonial rule. Communist insurgents under President Sukarno waged a war of independence. Indonesia was no longer a safe place to raise a family, with politically motivated attacks on Europeans becoming a daily occurrence. In 1950, they moved to Toowoomba, Queensland, Australia. Ian Leslie is a member of the Australian branch of Clan Leslie.

Ian was educated at Church of England Boys Prep and Toowoomba State High.

== Honours and awards ==
- Logie Award 1973 Best News Report
- Walkley Award 1979 Best Current Affairs Report
- Logie Award 1981 Outstanding Public Affairs Report
- Logie Award 1985 Reporter of the Year
- Medal of the Order of Australia (OAM) in the Queen's Birthday Honours 2009 for services to the media in current affairs journalism, and to the community
- He was a visiting fellow at the American Library in Paris in the spring of 2019

== Television career ==
Leslie became a cadet journalist in Toowoomba in 1962 with the local newspaper/television group DDQ-10, rising to News Editor. He moved to Sydney in 1972 as a senior reporter with the Ten Network. In 1977, he transferred to the Nine Network to join A Current Affair.

In 1979, the Australian edition of 60 Minutes was launched on the Nine Network, with Ian Leslie, Ray Martin and George Negus as the original reporting team. He remained in that role for the next 11 years, until 1989.

In his time with 60 Minutes, he is best remembered for his compassionate reporting, especially where children were involved, and for his unwavering commitment to expose suffering in Australia and in developing countries.

Leslie covered conflicts in most of the world's major trouble spots: Uganda, Zimbabwe, Mozambique, Lebanon, Thailand, Cambodia, Philippines, Burma, Korea, Indonesia, Afghanistan and Northern Ireland.

He is the only Australian journalist to have interviewed the Egyptian President Anwar Sadat.

He interviewed many other world leaders, including Indian Prime Minister Moraji Desai, Pakistan Prime Minister Benazir Bhutto, Presidents Ferdinand Marcos (Philippines), Godfrey Beniza, Milton Obote and Yoweri Muzeweri (all of Uganda).

In 1989, he re-joined the Ten Network to manage and produce primetime documentaries and special projects, becoming the Ten Evening News anchor.

In 1990, Ian Leslie formed a production company specialising in corporate communications.

In 2005, he anchored Fox Television's award-winning documentary series Running On Empty.

== Incident with Moro guerrilla ==
On a 60 Minutes assignment in the Philippines, a Moro guerrilla pulled a revolver from his holster, put it against Leslie's head, and pulled the trigger. Leslie had no idea the gun was not loaded.
