= The Drum (TV program) =

2010–2023 Australian panel TV series

- Genre: News, current affairs, politics
- Presented by: Julia Baird, Ellen Fanning, Dan Bourchier
- Country of origin: Australia
- Original language: English

Production
- Production locations: Ultimo Studios, Sydney
- Running time: 60 minutes

Original release
- Network: ABC; ABC News
- Release: 23 July 2010 – 15 December 2023

The Drum is an Australian nightly television show on current affairs and news analysis program that was hosted by Julia Baird, Ellen Fanning and Dan Bourchier and broadcast from 2010 until its cancellation in 2023. At the time of the program's airing, the program aired in the primetime slot of 6:00 pm weekdays on ABC TV and was aired later on the ABC News Channel at 9:00 pm.

The program was broadcast nationally across Australia, live from the ABC's headquarters in Sydney, with a special "week in review" episode broadcast on Saturday evening. It was also streamed live on iview, and broadcast in over 40 countries across the Asia Pacific region on the ABC's international channel, ABC Australia.

The program brought together a panel of prominent experts and high-profile opinion-leaders to discuss the key issues gripping or confounding Australia.

== History ==
The program premiered in 2010 with the launch of the ABC's 24-hour news channel, based on The Drum website. In May 2014, The Drum moved from the ABC News Channel to the ABC's primary channel with a new look, new timeslot of 5:30 pm and a new 30-minute format.

In January 2019 the program was relaunched again, moving to the prime time slot of 6 pm on ABC TV, ahead of the network's flagship news bulletin. The relaunch was seen as a push to take on commercial rivals in the primetime slot and the show was given a new set and look and a new hour–long format.

Annabel Crabb, Chris Uhlmann, Hamish Macdonald, Fran Kelly, Peter van Onselen, Steve Cannane, Stan Grant and John Barron have hosted the show in the past. At the time of the program's axing, the program was hosted by Australian journalists Julia Baird, Ellen Fanning, and Dan Bourchier.

A light and more relaxed summer version of the program was broadcast each January, hosted by Adam Spencer.

Eliza Harvey became the program's executive producer in December 2022.

On 12 December 2023, ABC Managing Director Justin Stevens announced the show would not be renewed with the last episode airing on 15 December.

== See also ==
- List of Australian television series
- List of programs broadcast by ABC (Australian TV network)
- List of longest-running Australian television series
