= Jim Waley =

Australian television presenter (born 1948)

- Born: 5 October 1948 (age 78); Sydney, New South Wales, Australia
- Occupations: Retired news presenter and journalist
- Years active: 1971−2010

Jim Waley (born 5 October 1948) is a retired Australian television presenter, best known for his work as a news anchor. on the Nine Network and Sky News.

== Career ==
In 1981, Waley was appointed founding host of Sunday. In 1986, he was invited to be founding presenter of the network's business and finance program Business Sunday.

He hosted Sydney Extra, a news-based program for Sydneysiders, in 1992 and later that year was appointed presenter/reporter for Nightline, the nightly 30-minute late-night news program seen nationally.

Widely regarded as the newsreader with the most credibility and gravitas, Waley worked largely in the studio until 1994 when it was suggested he should report from the field for the Sunday program. For example, in March 1998, he went on the trail of Saddam Hussein's hidden fortune, a journey that took him to Switzerland and a confrontation at the home of Saddam's private banker. The report won the gold medal for Best Special Report at the New York Festivals.

On several occasions every year, Waley would host the Sunday program from major world events, including elections in the United States and Russia, conflicts in the Balkans and the Middle East, and the British Hong Kong handover to China in 1997. He also reported Princess Diana's funeral service in August 1997.

Other foreign assignments included Waley's coverage from Sarajevo in 1998 and reporting breaking news in Washington of the growing political storm engulfing US President Bill Clinton and Monica Lewinsky. Waley also went on assignment to Nepal and the United States to profile the inspirational Tom Whittaker who, despite having an artificial leg, climbed to the top of Mount Everest.

On 2 December 2002, Waley replaced the retiring Brian Henderson as the anchor of National Nine News in Sydney. Although the bulletin continued to retain its long-standing ratings lead over rivals 10 News and Seven News in Sydney during his tenure (including maintaining a winning margin of over 100,000 viewers in 2003), he was replaced partway through a five-year contract by Mark Ferguson in early 2005. Under Ferguson's tenure, Nine News Sydney ratings started to deteriorate; it was not until Peter Overton took over in January 2009 that it would experience such high ratings once again.

After the axing of the Clive Robertson late night news program in 1992, Waley moved into the timeslot and hosted The World Tonight. This first version of what was later rebranded as Nightline focused exclusively on international news. At the 20th anniversary lunch in October 2007, Waley said he had plans to return to the media in the near future.

On 9 May 2009, Sky News announced that Waley had joined the 24-hour news channel to present a new nightly news bulletin called Sky National News with Jim Waley. The new bulletin premiered on 29 June 2009 at 6:00pm (AEST).

In May 2010, Sky News announced that Waley had been diagnosed with a recurrence of cancer in his left ear, and he would be taking a few months' leave. Waley never returned to Sky News and ultimately chose to retire.
