= Tara Brown =

Australian TV presenter (born 1968)

- Born: 14 March 1968 (age 58); Sydney, Australia
- Education: Davidson High School; Charles Sturt University
- Occupations: Journalist; news presenter; TV presenter
- Years active: 1992–present
- Employer: Nine Network
- Notable credit(s): 60 Minutes; A Current Affair; Nightline
- Spouse: John McAvoy (m. 2000; div. 2017)
- Children: 2

Tara Brown (born 14 March 1968) is an Australian television presenter and reporter.

== Early life and career ==
After graduating from Davidson High School in 1986, Brown attended Charles Sturt University in Bathurst, New South Wales, graduating in 1989 with a Bachelor of Arts (Communication) Degree.

After graduation, she joined Channel Seven's Sydney newsroom as an assistant to the chief-of-staff. In 1991, Brown moved to WIN Television in Wollongong, and undertook a cadetship in journalism.

=== Nine Network ===
In 1992, she joined the Nine Network and began working on compiling features including "Australian Agenda" reports for the Nine Network's late news programme Nightline. In 1993, she left Nightline and began reporting on A Current Affair. Her most memorable stories for A Current Affair include a series of reports on a group of Australian soldiers returning to Vietnam on the 20th anniversary of the fall of Saigon; uncovering a tyre dumping racket which posed a major environmental threat; and a feature story on refugees in Bei Hai in southern China.

In 2001, she became a reporter on the Nine Network's 60 Minutes. The first person Brown ever interviewed on 60 Minutes was Mel Gibson. Brown was also a fill-in presenter for Nine Sunday AM News. In 2009, she hosted the factual television You Saved My Life; it followed the stories of people who have been rescued in an emergency and reunited with their rescuers. It has a similar premise to the successful Seven Network factual television series Triple Zero Heroes.

In April 2016, Brown and eight other people (including three other staff members of the Nine Network, David Ballment, Stephen Rice, and Ben Williamson) were arrested on allegations of child abduction in Lebanon. Lebanese judicial sources told The Guardian that the group were to be charged with "armed abduction, purveying threats and physical harm" – crimes which carry sentences of twenty years' imprisonment with hard labour. She was released from custody only after the Nine Network paid a substantial money settlement to the father of the children, the subject of the attempted abduction.

== Personal life ==
Brown was married to TV producer John McAvoy from 2000 until their divorce in 2017. She has two sons, born in 2008 and 2010.

== In popular media ==
- In 2025, actress Sibylla Budd portrayed Brown in the Netflix series Apple Cider Vinegar based partly on disgraced “wellness guru” Belle Gibson; Brown interviewed Belle Gibson in a viral interview with 60 Minutes.
- In 2024, the actress Tamsin Carroll portrayed Brown in the stage musical Zombie!
