= Alessandra Galloni =

Italian journalist

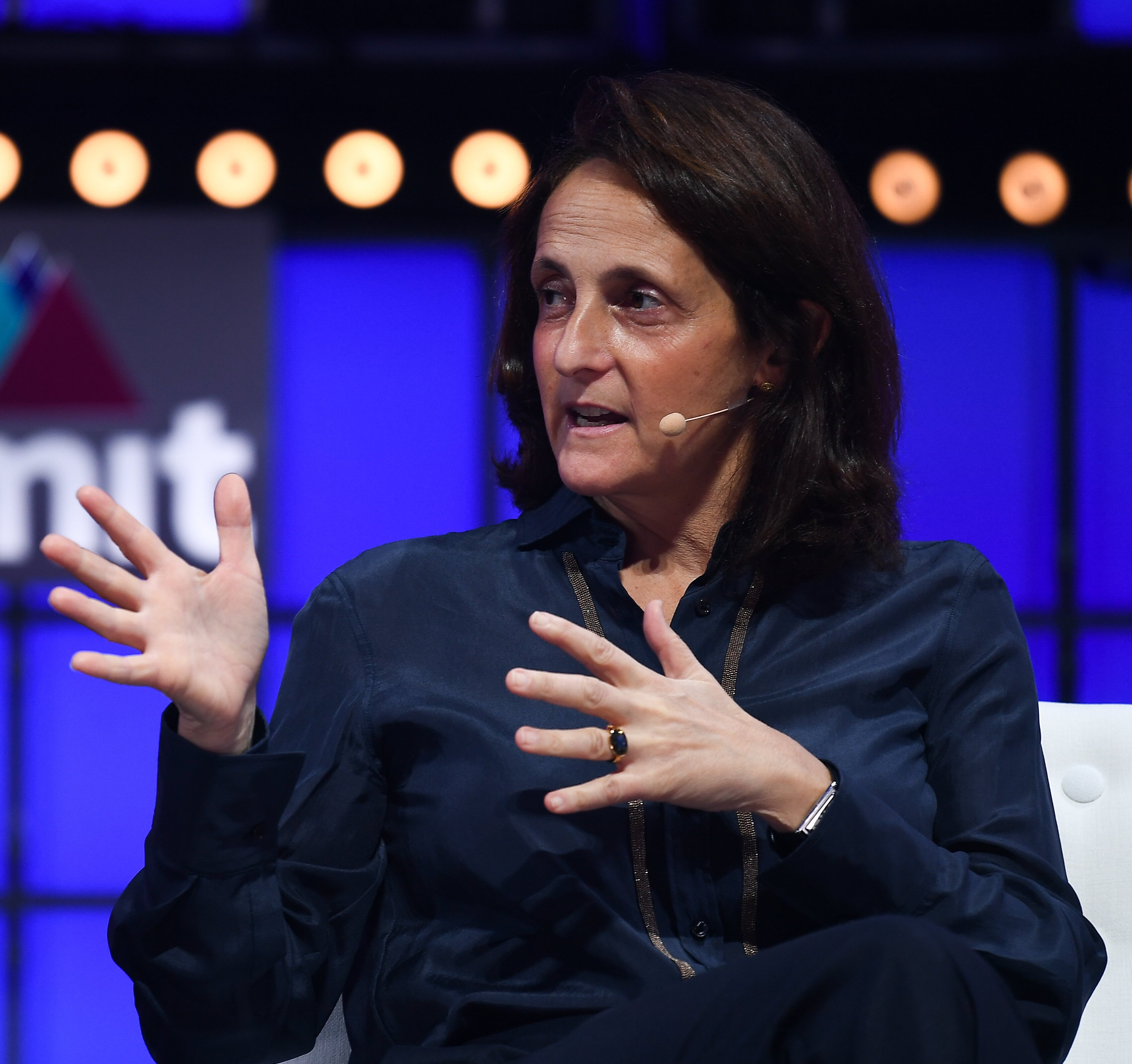
- Alessandra Galloni at the Web Summit 2021
- Born: c. 1974; Rome, Italy
- Education: Harvard University (AB); London School of Economics
- Occupation: Journalist
- Known for: Editor-in-Chief of Reuters
- Spouse: Marco
- Children: 2

Alessandra Galloni (born c. 1974) is an Italian journalist. In 2021, she became the first woman to serve as editor in chief of Reuters. She is the recipient of an Overseas Press Club Award, and Business Journalist of the Year Award.

== Early life and education ==
Galloni was born in Rome to Remo and Francesca Galloni. She attended Harvard University, graduating with a degree in government in 1995. While at Harvard she wrote for The Harvard Crimson. She then attended the London School of Economics, where she received a master's degree.

== Career ==
Galloni joined Reuters in 1996, where she worked for the organization's Italian-language news service, before moving to London in 1999 to cover equities and the British transportation industry. In 2000, Galloni joined The Wall Street Journal, covering economics and business from London, Paris, and Rome. She also served as a chief political and economic correspondent in Italy and France. From 2006 to 2011, Galloni was the Journal's Southern Europe bureau chief, and ran the Italy bureau for the Journal and Dow Jones newswires until 2013.

Galloni rejoined Reuters in 2013 as the Southern Europe bureau chief. Two years later, she became the global managing editor. In 2021, Reuters announced that Galloni would succeed Stephen Adler as editor-in-chief, the organization's first woman in its 170-year-history.

== Personal life ==
Galloni lives in London with her husband Marco and their two children. She speaks English, Italian, French, and Spanish.

== Bibliography ==
- (co-author) Pope Francis: From the End of the Earth to Rome.
