= 60 Minutes (Australian TV program) =

Australian news magazine program

- Genre: News magazine
- Based on: 60 Minutes by Don Hewitt
- Presented by: Tara Brown (2001–present); Amelia Adams (2022–present); Adam Hegarty (2024–present); Dimity Clancey (2024–present)
- Country of origin: Australia
- Original language: English
- No. of seasons: 40

Production
- Executive producer: Kirsty Thomson
- Production location: TCN-9 North Sydney, New South Wales
- Running time: 60 minutes

Original release
- Network: Nine Network
- Release: 11 February 1979 – present

Related
- 60 Minutes (1968–present)

60 Minutes is an Australian version of the American news magazine television show of the same title, airing on the Nine Network since 1979 on Sunday nights. A New Zealand version uses segments of the show. The program is one of five inducted into Australia's television Logie Hall of Fame.

== History ==
The program was founded by American television producer Gerald Stone, who was appointed its inaugural executive producer in 1979 by media tycoon Kerry Packer.

Stone devised it to be an Australian version of CBS's American 60 Minutes program and, upon its inauguration, it featured well-known reporters George Negus, Ray Martin and Ian Leslie. Its prominent early programs included a 1981 interview Negus conducted with UK Prime Minister Margaret Thatcher, during which the prime minister aggressively countered his questions. Negus asked Thatcher why people described her as "pig-headed" and the Prime Minister demanded he tell her who, when and where such comments were made.

In 1982, Jana Wendt interviewed Libyan leader Muammar Gaddafi and asked him why he had been so often described as a terrorist, a butcher, a gangster and a madman.

In 2019, the program produced a report on the infiltration of organised crime into listed Australian casino firm Crown Resorts. It led to multiple state and federal inquiries, including the NSW Bergin Inquiry, that recommended Crown Resorts may be unfit to hold a casino licence.

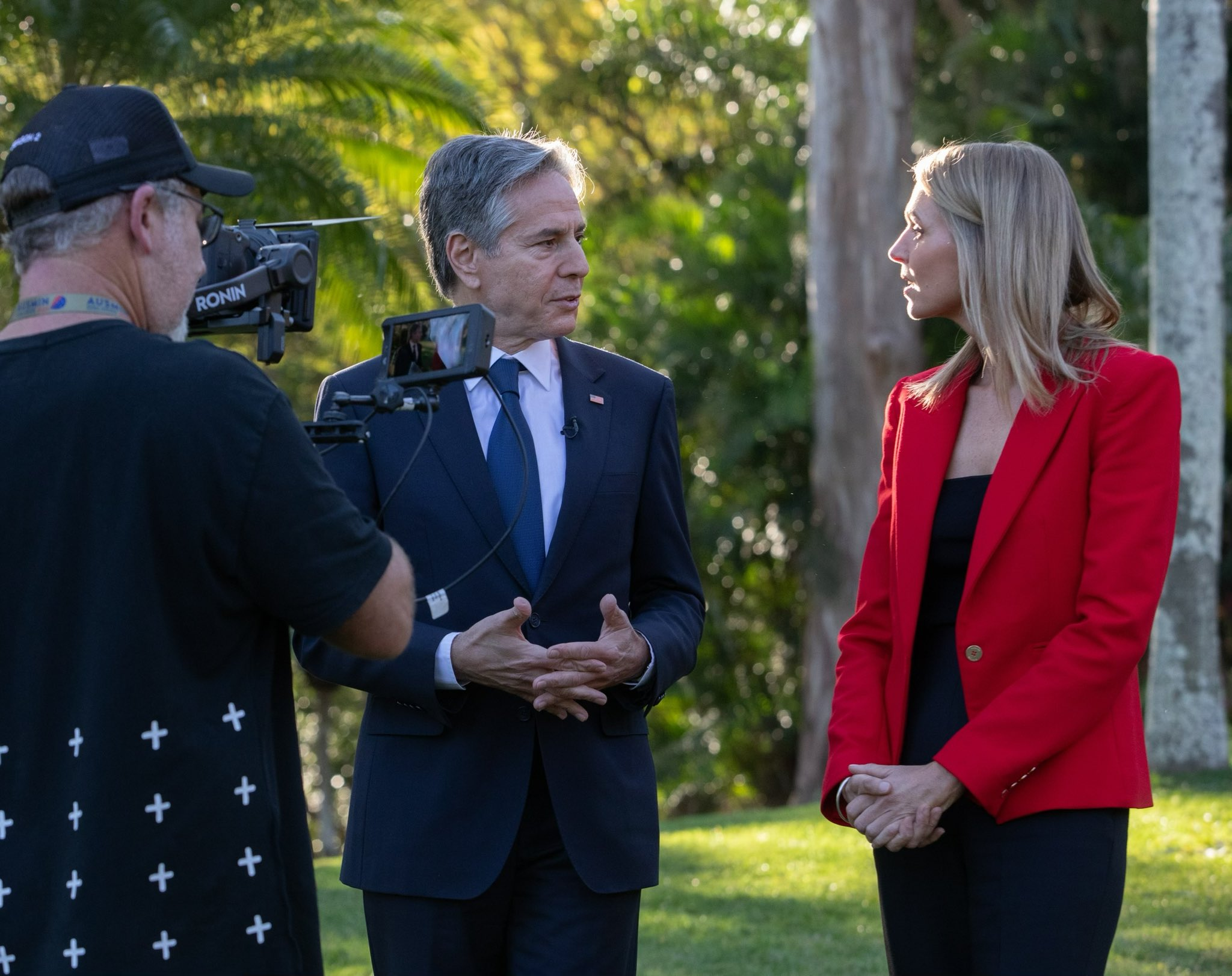
Antony Blinken (United States Secretary of State) being interviewed for the program in July 2023 by Amelia Adams

In March 2021, the Nine Network launched a one-hour, one-story, studio-based 60 Minutes spin-off Under Investigation presented by Liz Hayes and produced by Gareth Harvey that features a panel of guests.

== Staff ==
=== Current correspondents ===
- Tara Brown (2001–present)
- Amelia Adams (2022–present)
- Adam Hegarty (2024–present)
- Dimity Clancey (2024–present)

=== Former correspondents ===
- George Negus † (1979–1986)
- Ray Martin (1979–1984)
- Ian Leslie (1979–1989)
- Kate Baillieu (1979, resigned before show went to air)
- Jana Wendt (1982–1986, 1994)
- Jeff McMullen (1985–2000)
- Jennifer Byrne (1986–1993)
- Mike Munro (1986–1992)
- Richard Carleton † (1987–2006)
- Tracey Curro (1993–1997)
- Ellen Fanning (1999–2000)
- Paul Barry (2004–2005)
- Peter Harvey † (2003–2013)
- Michael Usher (2009–2016)
- Ross Coulthart (2015–2018)
- Charles Wooley (1993–2005, 2009–2019)
- Liam Bartlett (2006–2012, 2015–2022)
- Peter Stefanovic (2017)
- Tom Steinfort (2018, 2020–2023)
- Liz Hayes (1996–2025)

=== Contributing reporters ===
- Peter Overton (2001–2009 full-time, 2009–present)
- Karl Stefanovic (2005–2026)
- Ray Martin (2010–present)
- Deborah Knight (2020–present)
- Allison Langdon (2011–2017 full-time, 2018–present)
- Nick McKenzie (2019–present)
- Sarah Abo (2019–2022 full-time, 2023–2026)
- Tracy Grimshaw (2024–present)

=== Commentators ===
- Paul Lyneham † (1996–2000)
- Peter Harvey † (2003–2013)

=== Executive producers ===
- Gerald Stone † (1979–1992)
- Kirsty Thomson (2016–present)

== Awards ==
60 Minutes has won numerous awards for broadcasting, including five Silver Logies, one Special Achievement Logie, and received nominations for a further six Logie awards.

In 2018, 60 Minutes was inducted into the TV Week Logie Hall of Fame.

In 2019, its report on the organised crime infiltration of gaming giant Crown Resorts was awarded a Walkley Award and led to two Royal Commissions. In 2020, its program on political malfeasance, The Faceless Man, was awarded a Walkley Award for best long format television reporting.

In 2025, the program was nominated for two Logie awards owing to their work on the episode "Building Bad" (Best News Coverage or Current Affairs Report) and one general nomination for Best Current Affairs Program. Tara Brown was also nominated to receive the Ray Martin Award for Most Popular News or Public Affairs Presenter.

== Controversies ==
In February 1988, 60 Minutes collaborated with James Randi to create a fictional psychic called "Carlos", played by José Alvarez, for an elaborate investigation into how much free publicity a fraudulent medium could garner through the Australian media, and how such people could manipulate the gullibility of vulnerable people. However, during their investigation and successful attempt at convincing the Australian media that "Carlos" was a genuinely notable medium who had a strong following in America, other Channel 9 programs were caught out reporting on the fake "Carlos" who appeared on Today and A Current Affair and was featured on Sunday and Nine News. An orchestrated incident where his assistant threw water on George Negus during a second appearance on Today garnered even more attention for "Carlos". When the sting was revealed on 60 Minutes, criticism was directed at the network, and reports soon circulated about staff sackings as a result.

In July 1989, an episode of 60 Minutes entitled "The County" aired on Channel 9, which focused on the Indigenous population of Redfern, New South Wales from the perspective of local police. The episode received condemnation from the Koori community for its negative portrayal of the Aboriginal Australian population of Redfern, the invasion of private property by police and reporters during the filming of the episode, and for the use of ethnic slurs by police throughout the episode. The episode was the subject of a complaint to the Australian Broadcasting Tribunal, citing "a breach of the Television Program Standards relating to racial vilification". The complaint was rejected.

In April 2016, Tara Brown and eight other people (including three other staff members of Nine, David Ballment, Stephen Rice, and Ben Williamson) were arrested on allegations of child abduction in Beirut. According to Lebanese authorities, 60 Minutes allegedly paid $115,000 directly to the Child Abduction Recovery International Agency, despite claims that the exchange was made by the mother of the children. The abduction agency used has also been widely discredited, with fake recovery stories being posted on Facebook and their operators having been arrested all over the world. The recovery involved the team waiting in a parked car on the street and then snatching the children from their grandmother and nanny before driving away. "A Lebanese judicial source" told The Guardian that the group were to be charged with "armed abduction, purveying threats and physical harm" – crimes which carry sentences of twenty years' imprisonment with hard labour. The group were released from custody only after Nine paid a substantial money settlement to the father of the children the subject of the abduction attempt. This operation sparked wide debate about the ethics of the journalism being conducted.

In May 2019, a jury ruled that a 60 Minutes story aired in 2015 about the 2011 Grantham floods defamed four members of the Wagner family, from Toowoomba, Queensland, by implying they were responsible for the 12 deaths that occurred during the disaster. In November, a court ordered Channel Nine to pay $2.4 million plus $63,000 in interest to the family. Nick Cater, a journalist featured in the program, was ordered to pay an additional $1.2 million in damages. Justice Peter Applegarth, who was in charge of the case, stated that while Cater had information contradicting the program's allegations, he did not include them in the story. Applegarth also concluded that Channel Nine failed to inform the Wagners of the allegations until after the program had been publicised, and when the family did send a statement to Nine, they did not include it in the program.

== In popular media ==
- During Underbelly: Vanishing Act 60 Minutes is edited into the show telling the story of Melissa Caddick.
- The interview between Tara Brown and Belle Gibson is recreated for Netflix series Apple Cider Vinegar.

== See also ==
- List of Australian television series
- Journalism in Australia
- List of longest-running Australian television series
