= Ray Martin (television presenter) =

Australian journalist and television presenter

Ray Martin AM
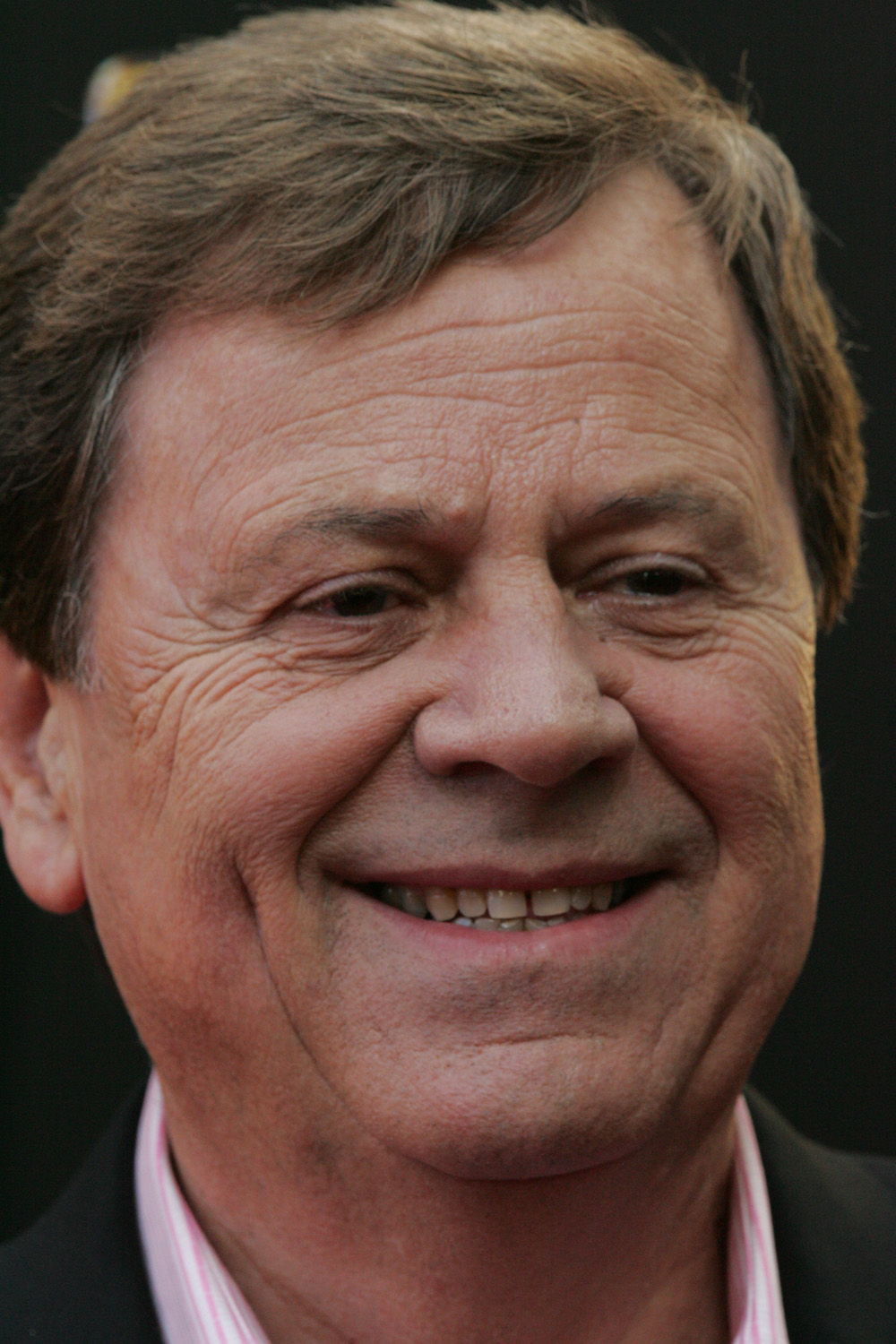
- Martin in 2013
- Born: Raymond George Grace; 20 December 1944 (age 81); Richmond, New South Wales, Australia
- Education: University of Sydney
- Occupations: Journalist, television presenter
- Years active: 1965–present
- Known for: Four Corners; This Day Tonight; Midday with Ray Martin (1985–1993); Ray Martin Presents; Up Close and Personal; The Ray Martin Show; 60 Minutes; Carols by Candlelight (1990–2007); A Current Affair (1994–1998; 2003–2005)
- Awards: Gold Logie Award (1987; 1993–1996) for his role on Midday and A Current Affair

Raymond George Martin (né Grace, 20 December 1944) is an Australian television journalist and entertainment personality. Having won the Gold Logie five times, he is the most awarded star of Australian television, along with Graham Kennedy (although Kennedy won the 'Star of the Year Award', the forerunner of the Gold Logie in 1959).

He is best known for his various on-air roles on Nine Network from 1978, particularly his stint on A Current Affair and his long tenure as host of the variety/talk show The Midday Show, after original host Mike Walsh left as host of a similar midday format with The Mike Walsh Show. In 2011, he returned to the current affairs show 60 Minutes, in which he had been an original presenter, albeit only in a part-time capacity.

== Early life and education ==
He was born Raymond George Grace into an Irish-Australian Catholic family in Richmond, New South Wales, Australia. He was the youngest of four children and their only son. His mother changed the family surname to Martin to prevent her abusive, alcoholic husband from finding her and their children after they fled from him in c. 1955. She and the children moved many times, settling in Adelaide and in Tasmania. In the early 1990s, he found out that his great-great-grandmother was an Indigenous Australian woman from the Kamilaroi nation, near Gunnedah.

He attended Launceston College and the University of Sydney, where he studied engineering on scholarship at university, but changed his mind and studied to become an English and history teacher. He graduated with a Bachelor of Arts in 1967.

== Media career ==
Martin began working for Australian Broadcasting Corporation (ABC) in Sydney as a cadet in 1965. He was appointed the ABC's New York City correspondent in 1969. Over the next 10 years his coverage included race riots, anti-Vietnam War protests, Olympic Games and presidential elections for news and current affairs television and radio, from Four Corners and This Day Tonight to science and religion programs.

In 1978, he joined the Nine Network to launch 60 Minutes, along with reporters George Negus and Ian Leslie.

From 1985 to 1993, he presented the daily variety show Midday with Ray Martin and hosted top-rating specials such as Ray Martin Presents, Up Close and Personal and The Ray Martin Show, interviewing entertainment celebrities including Tom Cruise, Nicole Kidman, Robin Williams, Elton John, Jim Carrey, Michael Douglas, Billy Crystal, Jodie Foster, Michael Crawford, Paul Hogan, Russell Crowe and Madonna.

He hosted A Current Affair from 1994 to 1998 and went on to present three series – Our Century, The Great Debates and Simply the Best – before returning to 60 Minutes to do special reports. In 2003 he resumed as host of A Current Affair. It was announced in December 2005 that he would become the Nine Network's Senior Reporter. This quashed much speculation that he would return to Four Corners at the ABC, as the fluctuating ratings for A Current Affair had decreased. Over the past few years he has assisted in reporting with some major events including the Indonesian tsunami disaster in 2005. Former Today co-host Tracy Grimshaw replaced Martin on ACA at the beginning of 2006. He was then a senior correspondent for Nine Network.

He has also hosted diverse television events, from the Logie Awards, Commonwealth Games, World Cup Cricket, 1988 Bicentenary Spectacular and Federal and State Election nights to the aftermath of the 11 September terrorist attacks. From 16 September 2007, Martin took over as co-host of Sunday, replacing Ross Greenwood.

Martin left the Nine Network in February 2008, allegedly due to differences with management over budget cuts and a timeslot change for the Sunday program.

On 28 March 2008, it was announced that Martin would lead the official broadcast of the World Youth Day event in Sydney from 15 to 20 July 2008.

In October 2008, Martin criticised the Nine Network and other commercial television operations during an address at the annual Andrew Olle Media Lecture. The subject of Martin's criticism was an alleged "dumbing down" of journalism and news coverage.

Since 2014, Martin has been the presenter for the SBS series First Contact. In 2015, he featured on the SBS Australian version of the popular international franchise genealogy television documentary series Who Do You Think You Are?. In 2017, he hosted Look Me In The Eye.

In 2016 and 2017, Martin presented three primetime specials for the regional network Prime7 focusing on major social issues impacting their viewing areas: Ice: The Scourge of Regional Australia, Dark Secrets: Australia's Hidden Shame, and It Won't Happen To Me.

In August 2018, Martin was announced as a presenter on the Nine Network's new travel series Helloworld, which aired on 7 October 2018 and aired for the first two seasons.

In 2020, during the first Australian COVID-19 lockdowns, Martin presented the ABC comedy series At Home Alone Together, a satire of lifestyle television with a pandemic theme.

In 2024, Martin presented the three-part SBS series, Ray Martin: The Last Goodbye. The series explores trends, rituals and practices surrounding death and funerals.

== Controversy ==
=== Incident with John Safran ===
In 1998, John Safran, an Australian documentarian and media personality, created a television pilot called John Safran: Media Tycoon, which was focused on the media industry. It became infamous for a segment where Safran turned up to Martin's house and confronted him in the tabloid style characteristic of A Current Affair and its peers. Martin was in contact with the ABC and specifically warned Safran in the segment that he had spoken to Roger Grant, the then Head of Corporate Affairs at the ABC. The segment was later played on Media Watch on ABC and on Enough Rope. Safran went through Martin's garbage and took Shane Paxton (a former A Current Affair story subject) in his effort to engage Martin.

== Awards ==
Organization	Award	Year	Awarded for	Results
Logie Awards	Gold Logie X5	Annual recipient 1987, 1993, 1994,1995, 1996	3× for Midday; 2× Host of A Current Affair	Won
Logie Awards	Silver Logie Award			Won
People's Choice Awards				Won
Variety, the Children's Charity	Entertainment award			Won
Mo Award	Entertainment honour			Won
Queensland Media Awards	Media personality			Won

== National honours ==
Martin was appointed a Member of the Order of Australia (AM) in the 2010 Australia Day Honours "for service to the community through voluntary roles with charitable, Indigenous, health and sporting organisations, and to the media as a television journalist."

Martin was awarded the Centenary Medal on 1 January 2001.

In 2018, Martin was honoured with a special collection of post stamps issued by Australia Post, with his portrait featured on the stamp, as part of the legends of television series.

Martin was also honoured with a star on Caloundra Walk of Stars in early 2007.

== Personal life ==
Martin is married to Dianne Martin, with whom he has two children.

Although his parents separated, they never divorced owing to a huge stigma regarding divorce. His father died in the mid-1980s.

== Political views ==
Martin is a republican and has called for a change in the Australian flag to reflect the nation's increasing multicultural identity.

During the 2023 Australian Indigenous Voice referendum, Martin supported the "Yes" vote. At a Yes campaign event in Sydney's inner west, he took issue with the No Campaign's slogan "If You Don't Know, Vote No." At the event, Martin said "what that asinine slogan is saying is if you're a dinosaur or a dickhead who can't be bothered reading, then vote no."

== Interests ==
Martin is a supporter and current board member of the South Sydney Rabbitohs NRL team.

He was Chairman of the Australian Indigenous Education Foundation (AIEF), was Chairman of The Fred Hollows Foundation and has supported children's services at Royal North Shore Hospital. From 1991 to 2000, he was a full-term member of the Council for Aboriginal Reconciliation. As of November 2020 he is an Ambassador for the AIEF.

He is a Brand Tasmania Ambassador.

For more than 30 years, the children's charity the Humpty Dumpty Foundation has enjoyed support from Martin.

== Books ==
=== As author ===
- Ray: Stories of My Life (2009)
- Ray Martin's Favourites: The stories behind the legends, Melbourne University Publishing (2011)

=== Forewords ===
- Martin, Ray (1990). Foreword. How to Puzzle a Python. By Walker, Max. Magenta Press. ISBN 0-908081-36-7.

== Philanthropy ==
Martin has been a Patron of the Humpty Dumpty Foundation since 1990 to raise awareness of the Foundation and the work it provides for sick children in hospitals across Australia. Martin hosts many of Humpty's events as well as being involved in trips across Australia to meet with medical professionals, young hospital patients and their families. Ray is also involved in The Good Egg Magazine, which celebrates the work of the Humpty Dumpty Foundation.

One of Martin's oldest colleagues was Fred Hollows, and, through their friendship, Martin became a distinguished ambassador and chairman for The Fred Hollows Foundation. Martin utilized his career in journalism to help raise awareness for the international non-profit organization. The Fred Hollows Foundation educates surgeons on how to treat avoidable blindness within underserved communities and countries. Specifically, they work within the Aboriginal and Torres Strait Islander communities of Indigenous Australia.
