= Jana Wendt =

Australian news journalist

- Born: 9 May 1956 (age 70); Melbourne, Australia
- Education: University of Melbourne
- Occupations: Reporter; journalist; writer
- Years active: 1979−
- Spouse: Brendan Ward
- Children: 1
- Awards: Gold Logie

Jana Bohumila Wendt (/ˈjɑːnɑː vɛnt/ YAH-nah VENT; born 9 May 1956) is an Australian television journalist, reporter, and writer.

== Early life and education ==
Jana Bohumila Wendt was born in Melbourne in 1956 to Czech parents who emigrated to Australia in 1949, as political refugees on account of her father's work as a journalist for a Czech dissident newspaper.

Wendt attended Presentation College, Windsor, before graduating at the University of Melbourne with a Bachelor of Arts (French, Honours) in 1979.

== Career ==
During her career, Wendt worked for every major commercial broadcaster as well as the public broadcasters. She was at one point the highest-paid person on Australian television.

Starting as a researcher for the ABC, Wendt's television career began as a journalist for ATV-10 evening news, before sharing presenting duties with David Johnston.

In 1982, Wendt then went on to be one of the first reporters on the Australian Nine Network's version of 60 Minutes, as well as filing stories for the American CBS 60 Minutes. 60 Minutes producer Gerald Stone described her as "more like a Hollywood film star than anyone else in Australian TV".

Wendt hosted A Current Affair, also on Nine, from 1987 until November 1992. Prime Minister Bob Hawke chose to announce his resignation via a pre-recorded interview with Wendt on A Current Affair in 1992, rather than by giving a press conference. His successor, Paul Keating, gave her his first interview as Prime Minister.

She also hosted Dateline on SBS and Witness on Seven. She also did a number of specials for the ABC.

She returned to Channel Nine in 2003 to host Sunday.

Over the course of her career, Wendt interviewed, among others, Yasser Arafat, Muammar Gaddafi, Alan Bond, and Dustin Hoffman.

Rumours of Wendt's departure from Nine began in June 2006, when the network announced it would merge its Sunday and Business Sunday programs. Leaks to the print media revealed that the network wanted to replace Wendt with Ellen Fanning. CEO Eddie McGuire in particular was accused of trying to "white-ant" Wendt. On 1 September 2006, it was announced that Wendt would leave the Nine Network.

The absence of Wendt on the Sunday program's relaunch on 3 September 2006 was met with an unprecedented number of complaints.

Wendt was then sacked from her regular "Lunch" column for The Bulletin magazine, due to the association the magazine had with the Nine Network; both had the same parent company, PBL.

On 12 September 2006, just ten days after she left the Nine Network, Wendt agreed to appear on stage at the Seven Network's 50 Years of Television presentation, where she co-presented the News and Current Affairs section with Sydney news presenter Ian Ross, another former Nine Network employee.

== Fiction ==
In 2025 Wendt published a book of short stories, entitled The Far Side of the Moon and Other Stories. It has been well-received by critics.

== Other activities ==
Delivering the second Andrew Olle Media Lecture in 1997, Wendt said of the profession:

I was rewarded handsomely, extravagantly... and that reward has now bought me the most valuable commodity of all – freedom. I am able to say many things that my colleagues, still tied to one or other mighty media empire cannot say. They are the ones who continue to work within an increasingly restrictive atmosphere. An atmosphere imposed by what has transformed ominously, from journalism that is true to itself, into journalism dictated overridingly by the market. And yet more and more, journalists are asked to distort their values to the perceived dictates of the market.

Wendt presented the Logies Hall of Fame award to the program 60 Minutes at the 2018 Logies.

== Personal life ==
Wendt married producer Brendan Ward in 1984 and they have one son, Daniel.

In 2004, a painting of Wendt by artist Evert Ploeg won the Packing Room Prize at the Archibald Prize.

== Awards ==
Wendt won the 1992 Gold Logie Award for her role as host of A Current Affair. She was not at the presentation to accept her award, citing commitments to A Current Affair, based in Sydney, while the awards were being presented in Melbourne.

Wendt won a Lifetime Achievement Award at the 2018 Kennedy Awards.

== Publications ==
- A Matter of Principle – New Meetings with the Good, the Great and the Formidable, Melbourne University Press, 2007. ISBN 978-0-522-85414-5.
- Nice Work, Melbourne University Press, 2010. ISBN 978-0-522-85620-0
- The Search for MH370 Deepest Dive (2022), eight-part podcast presented by Jana Wendt and Peter Waring
- The Far Side of the Moon and Other Stories, Text, 2025. ISBN 978-1-923-05841-5
