= Willesee =

Willesee may refer to:

- Bill Willesee (1911–2000), Australian politician
- Don Willesee (1916-2003), Australian politician
- Michael Willesee, Jr., Australian television journalist
- Mike Willesee (1942-2019), Australian television journalist
- Terry Willesee, Australian television presenter
