= Sonia Humphrey =

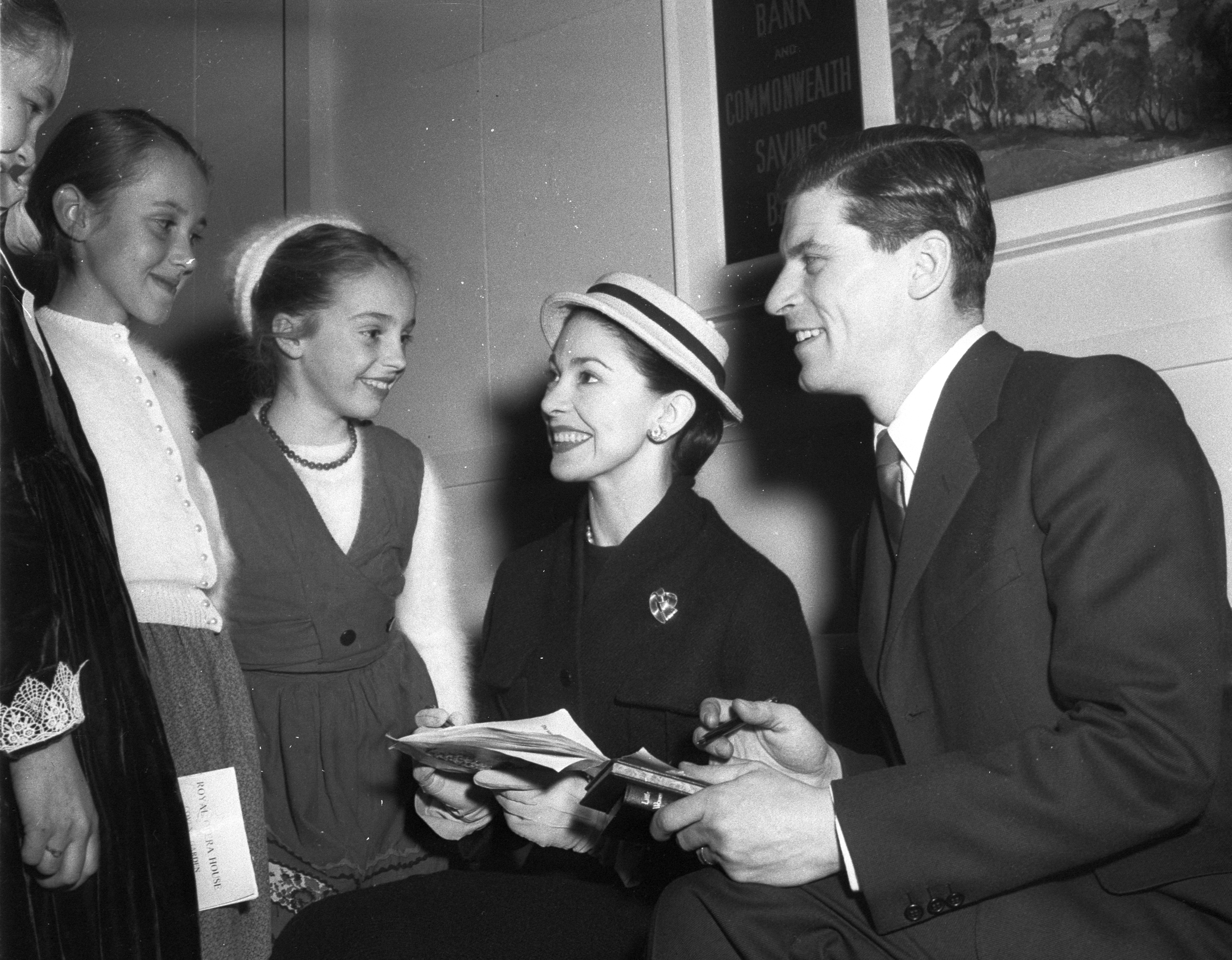
- Sonia Humphrey (centre), aged 9, in May 1957 greeting at Dame Margot Fonteyn
- Born: Sonia Denise Humphrey; 10 November 1947; Cambridge, England, United Kingdom
- Died: 1 January 2011 (aged 63); Tasmania, Australia
- Other names: Sonia MacDougall
- Education: Royal Academy of Dance; Royal Ballet School; National Institute of Dramatic Art
- Occupation(s): Television presenter and journalist
- Years active: 1969–2005
- Spouse(s): Nick Creech (????–1987); Ian MacDougall (1996–2011; her death)
- Children: 2

Sonia Denise Humphrey (10 November 1947 – 1 January 2011) was an Australian television presenter, newsreader and journalist. Humphrey was a talented ballerina as a child and studied television production before working as an archaeologist for five years; during this period she also converted to Judaism. In the mid 1970s Humphrey worked as a television reporter and newsreader in Australia before presenting opera and ballet simulcasts for the Australian national broadcaster ABC. The management of ABC tried to remove Humphrey as a presenter of opera broadcasts due to her pregnancy, citing "aesthetic reasons". Humphrey pursued legal action against ABC, and the decision was reversed.

== Early life and training ==
Sonia Humphrey was born in 1947 in Cambridge, England to Australian scientists George Humphrey and Beverley Franklin. She was a talented ballerina, and was the youngest recipient of a diploma with solo seal from the Royal Academy of Dance—the academy's highest award. She enrolled in the Royal Ballet School in London, but after a knee injury, she left the school and moved to Sydney.

== Ballet career ==
In Australia, she danced for the Australian Ballet before giving up dancing.

Humphrey met ballerina Dame Margot Fonteyn—whom she had seen perform in London—at Sydney Airport in May 1957. A photograph of their meeting was published on the front page of The Sydney Morning Herald. Five years later they met again, when Fonteyn visited the Lorraine Norton dance studio where Humphrey was a student.

== Production career ==
In 1969, Humphrey graduated from the National Institute of Dramatic Art (NIDA), specialising in technical production.

She then joined an archaeological dig in Israel, where she remained for five years, and converted to Judaism. During the Yom Kippur War, she worked as a field producer for the American Broadcasting Company. In 1974, she produced its coverage of the Turkish invasion of Cyprus.

== Journalism career ==
In 1975, Humphrey returned to Australia and applied for a job at Network Ten in a production capacity. Instead, she was offered an on-air role as a reporter for Ten's Eyewitness News, later serving as a weather presenter and a newsreader. She was the first journalist on the scene of the Granville rail disaster in January 1977, and her reporting of the disaster – cameras calculatingly placed to bring the full force of the dimensions of the news event; personal reportage on-camera given way to a staggering arresting loss of objective composure – impressed the national broadcaster enough, the Australian Broadcasting Corporation (ABC), to propose that she present its current affairs program This Day Tonight, and subsequently, Nationwide.

In 1981, Humphrey was one of three original reporters of the ABC science program Towards 2000. With her background in dance, she also presented several simulcasts of ballet and opera performances for the ABC.

In 1983, Humphrey became pregnant with her second child and the ABC's management sought to remove her from on-air roles—including the fifth of a series of opera simulcasts she had been presenting, the Australian Opera's production of Adriana Lecouvreur on 18 February 1984—citing what Humphrey called "aesthetic reasons" (or a "visual overload" to viewers, as an ABC arts producer had said) rather than medical ones as to why she should not present the simulcast on air whilst 33 weeks pregnant. Humphrey sought internal mediation, which failed. She then took the ABC to the New South Wales Anti-Discrimination Board, and the broadcaster subsequently reversed the decision.

In 1985, Humphrey was the original presenter of the consumer affairs program The Investigators. She was replaced as host by Helen Wellings in a 1987 refresh of the show.

== Personal life ==
Humphrey was married to Sydney journalist Nick Creech with whom she had two sons—they divorced in 1987. In 1996, she married Vice-Admiral Ian MacDougall, whom she had met several years earlier when he was Chief of Naval Staff and she was producing and directing documentaries for the Australian Defence Force and Film Australia.

Humphrey and MacDougall relocated to Marrawah, Tasmania in 2005.

Humphrey died in 2011 at the age of 63.
