= Allan Martin (TV producer) =

New Zealand TV producer and athlete

Allan Martin OBE
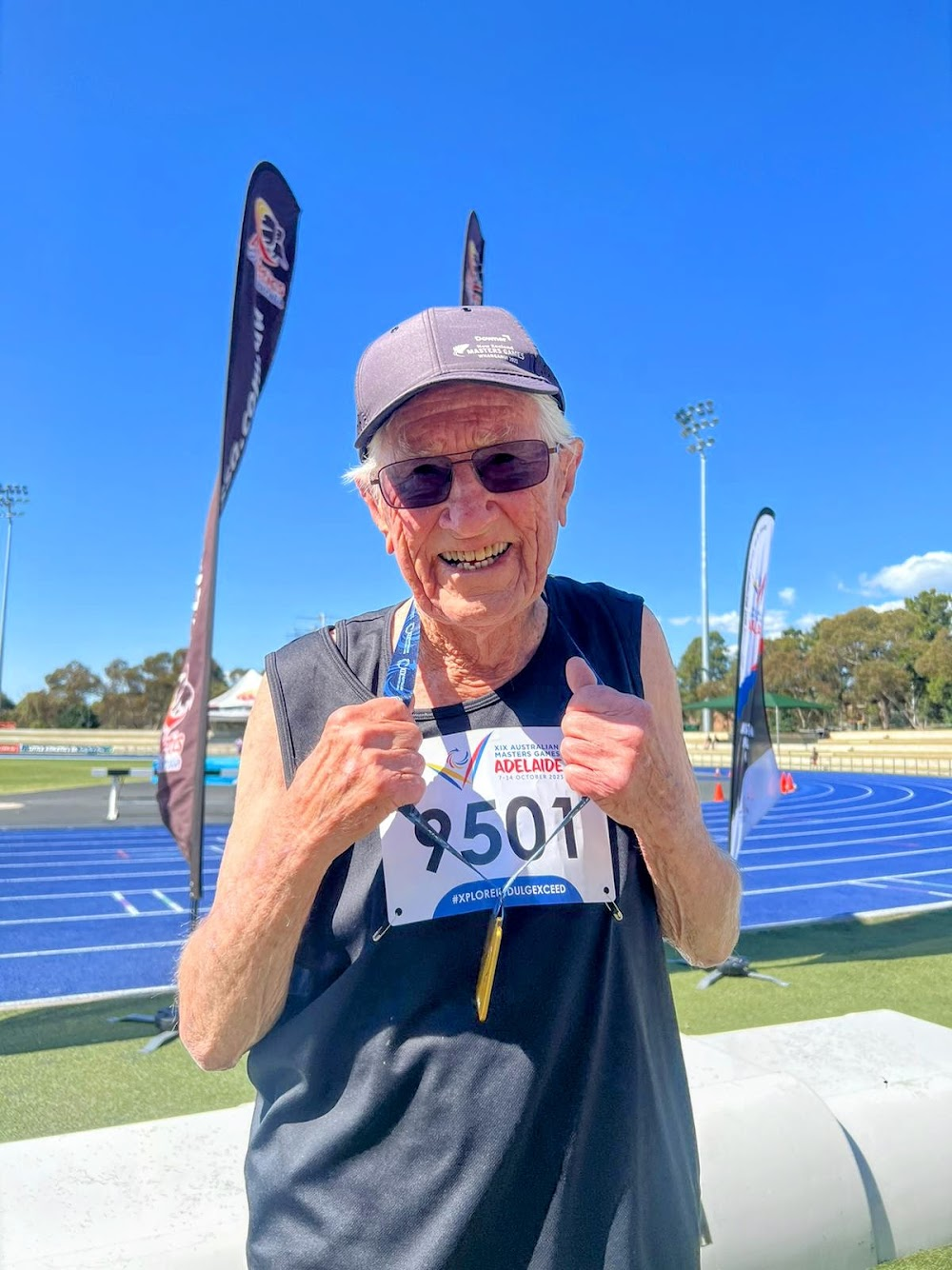
- Martin at the Masters Games in Adelaide, 2023
- Born: Allan Wilfrid Martin; 2 May 1926 (age 100); Auckland, New Zealand
- Occupations: Television producer; television director; athlete

Allan Wilfrid Martin OBE (born 2 May 1926) is a New Zealand Masters athlete and former television director and producer. He is known particularly for his pioneering television current affairs programmes such as Compass and Town and Around in New Zealand and This Day Tonight and Four Corners in Australia.

Martin served as director general of TV2, which became South Pacific Television and TVNZ, from 1975 to 1985.

In Masters athletics, he has competed in track events, javelin and discus.

== Early life and broadcasting ==
Allan Wilfrid Martin was born in Auckland, New Zealand on 2 May 1926 to Wilfrid Egerton Martin and Alice Ethel May Fry.

He was introduced to broadcast radio while serving as part of the New Zealand J Force in Japan. Returning to New Zealand with the J Force in 1948, Martin worked both on the family dairy farm in Whangarei and as a contract announcer at the local radio station Radio Northland 1XN. He left New Zealand in 1952 with an offer to join the South African Broadcasting Corporation but instead chose to join the private LM Radio, a shortwave station broadcasting to South Africa and Rhodesia from Lourenço Marques (the colonial era name of Maputo). It was there he met his wife Elaine Joy Turner.

Martin moved to the UK in 1955 to direct programs for Associated Rediffusion, the ITV franchise holder for London. A posting to the New Zealand Broadcasting Corporation as a production supervisor followed in 1963, then in 1966, the Australian Broadcasting Corporation offered Martin the chance to produce a daily current affairs program which he called "This Day Tonight". During his time in Australia, Martin established a vineyard in Palmers Lane, Pokolbin, which became the Worthington Estate(now Bimbadgen).

== Media career ==
Martin's work as an announcer for LM Radio led him to London to work for Associated Rediffusion (AR) under Thomas Brownrigg. At AR Martin directed a series for schools "Ma Ville" filmed in France and "Questions in the House", a forerunner of other political programs. Returning to the New Zealand capital Wellington in 1963, Martin became executive producer of the nightly current affairs programme "Town and Around" in the four main cities (Wellington, Auckland, Dunedin and Christchurch) and of the national "Compass" current affairs program.

In 1966, Martin joined the Australian Broadcasting Corporation (ABC) as executive producer of the nightly, live current affairs show "This Day Tonight" (TDT). The program subjected Australian politicians to sharp questioning and raised the hackles of politicians on both sides who were unused to being placed under such scrutiny. TDT also provided a training ground for journalists and presenters, many of whom became household names in the Australian media landscape: Richard Carleton; Ray Martin; Paul Murphy; George Negus; Andrew Olle; Bill Peach; Gerald Stone and Mike Willesee. After two years with TDT, Martin moved to the weekly ABC flagship program Four Corners, taking Mike Willesee with him as frontman. Martin has described his Four Corners period as a torrid and testing time for current affairs covering the public and political debate over the Vietnam War.

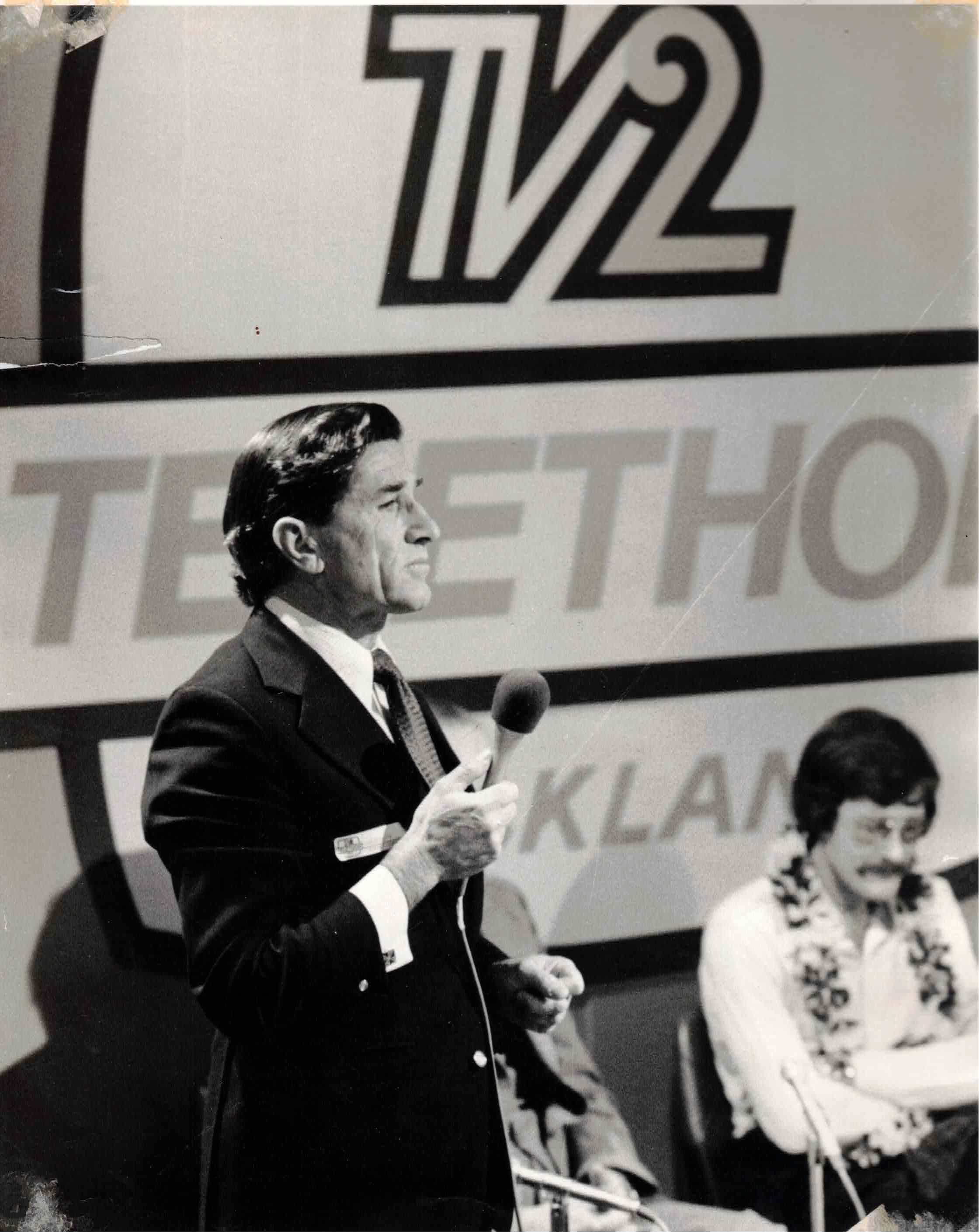
Allan Martin speaking at the first Telethon in aid of the St John Ambulance, June, 1975

Martin was promoted to head of Public Affairs Television at the ABC in 1972 and made president of the Producers and Directors Guild of Australia that same year. In 1974, he took up the post of Director General at the newly created TV2 Corporation of New Zealand, competing against his old friend from "Compass" days, Alan Morris who was running TVOne NZ. In its first week of operation, in June 1975, the network held New Zealand's first Telethon, "setting the community of its ears" and raising $593,000 for the St John Ambulance.

Martin rebranded TV2 as South Pacific Television in 1976, believing the service should reflect its geographical and cultural location. In 1980 the two channels were merged as Television New Zealand, however Martin continued the popular telethons, raising for example, $5million for the International Year of Disabled Persons in 1981. Another milestone, the first nightly news bulletin in Maori Te Karere, made its appearance in 1982. TVNZ also succeeded with exports such as the "Hunter's Gold" series which was sold to the BBC and "That's Country" which screened in Nashville, USA. Martin's production "Gallipoli: The New Zealand Story" (1984) was described as a 'monument' by critic Juliet Hensley for its careful storytelling.

== Retirement and life long learning ==
Martin graduated from Auckland University with a PhD in philosophy in 2006. His thesis "Older Adulthood, Education and Social Change was published as a book in Germany. Martin began entering local athletic events such as the Auckland Round the Bays Run following his retirement. He has attended regional and international Masters Games since 2009 and contributes to the online news service "The Ideas Channel". In the age of 95+ years old, he involves in multiple events and received many interviews for the involvement in athlete fields.

=== List of Works ===
==== Thesis ====
- Older adulthood, education and social change

==== Television shows ====
- Gallipoli: The New Zealand Story: 1984, Producer
- Touch and Go – The Battle for Crete May 1941: 1981, Executive Producer
- This Day Tonight: 1967–1969, Executive Producer, Producer
- Compass – First Five Years of Television: 1966, Producer
- Compass – The RSA: 1966, Producer
- Town and Around: 1966–1967, Producer (Wellington)
- Column Comment: 1964–1965, Producer
- Compass: 1965–66, Producer
- Retiring: 1962, Director
- Four Corners: 1970–1973, Executive Producer
- The Gallant Loser: 1960, Director
- Endless Adventure: 1959–1960, Director
- No Hiding Place: 1960, Director
- This Week (England): 1958–1962, Director

== Awards / participated competitions ==
=== Sports ===
- 2025 World Masters Games @ Taipei, Taiwan: Gold x2+
- 2025 New Zealand Masters Games @Whanganui, New Zealand: Gold x3 (200m, discus, javelin); Silver x2 (60m, 100m)
- 2024 Pan American Masters Games @Cleveland, United States: Gold x5(100m, 200m, 400m, discus, javelin)
- 2023 New Zealand Masters Games @Whanganui, New Zealand: Gold x5 (100m, 200m, 400m, Javelin, Long Jump)
- 2023 Australian Masters Games @Adelaide, Australia: Gold x6 (60m, 100m, 200m, 400m, Javelin, Long Jump)
- 2017 World Masters Games @Auckland, New Zealand: Gold x6 (100m, 200m, 400m, 800m, Javelin, Long Jump)
- 2013 World Masters Games @Torino, Italy: Gold x2 (Long Jump, 100m); Silver (800m)
- 2009 World Masters Games @ Sydney, Australia: no medals
- 1997 New Zealand Masters Games @ Whanganui, New Zealand: Gold x3 (100m, Long jump, 25 metre swimming)

== Honours ==
1987 – Order of the British Empire – For Services to Broadcasting

=== Television Awards ===
- 1968 Logie Awards (Australia) – Special Commendation for Production - Current Affairs
- 1985 Feltex Awards – Best Documentary: Gallipoli, the New Zealand Story
- 2002 Qantas Television Awards – Broadcasting Industry Award for Outstanding Achievement

== Sources ==
- Infofind – Radio New Zealand Library
- Dai Bindoff and Ron Palenski, XIVth Commonwealth Games – The Official History (Auckland: Moa Publications, 1991)
- Jenny Chamberlain, 'Doc Martin' – North and South, August 2006, page 84
- Paul Day, Voice & Vision: A History of Broadcasting in New Zealand
- Graeme Kennedy, 'You Don't Make $100m by being inefficient, says TV chief' – Auckland Star, 5 May 1984
- Selwyn Parker, 'Allan Martin: Unique Opportunity' – The Listener, 13 July 1974
- Barry Shaw, 'Right Man for the Right Job' – Auckland Star 1974 (exact date unknown)
- Paul Smith, Revolution in the Air (Longman Books, 1996)
- Wellington correspondent, 'NZBC loses top producer' – The Auckland Star, 13 January 1967
- Bill Peach, This Day Tonight – How Australian Current Affairs TV Came of Age (Sydney: ABC Enterprises for the Australian Broadcasting Corporation, 1992) first night page 2, 6, 30; joins TDT page 28; leaves TDT page 71; proposal to sack page 135. See also pages 61, 183, 225–26, 231, 233, 235, 238.
- Gordon Bick, The Compass File (Christchurch: The Caxton Press, 1968) pages 19, 20, 21, 25, 92, 143, 144, 173.
- Juliet Hensley, 'Superb Programme Marks a Bad Week' – Evening Post, 28 April 1984
