= Clive Hale =

Australian television presenter (1937–2005)

- Born: 26 April 1937; Cowell, South Australia
- Died: 5 June 2005 (aged 67); Sydney, New South Wales
- Education: South Australian School of Art
- Occupation: television presenter
- Television: ABC News; This Day Tonight; Nationwide; For Love or Money; Roundabout

Clive Norman Hale (26 April 1937 – 5 June 2005) was an Australian television presenter, best known for his 38-year association with the Australian Broadcasting Corporation.

== Biography ==
=== Early life ===
Hale was born in Cowell, South Australia on the Eyre Peninsula. Hale was the youngest of three children.

He was educated at Norwood High School and studied art at the South Australian School of Art with the intention of being an artist.

=== Career ===
In 1949, Hale secured his first job as a newspaper boy, selling copies of The News.

While studying his fine arts degree in 1957, Hale obtained work at Adelaide radio station 5KA presenting a night show, before getting a job with 5DN to host the interview program Monitor.

In 1959, Hale relocated to Perth where he started working of the ABC, commencing his television career at ABW-2 from the first night the station was on air. While at ABW-2, he was a news presenter and hosted the station's first news magazine program Roundabout.

In 1966, he returned to Adelaide to anchor the local weeknight edition of ABC News on ABS-2, before hosting the local current affairs program This Day Tonight (or TDT) the following year. With Hale as the presenter, TDT became hugely influential in South Australian politics. Hale's popularity as the host of the South Australian edition of TDT was such that the ABC printed bumper stickers saying "I like Clive".

Disgruntled at the way ABC managers were censoring TDT story rundowns, Hale left the ABC in 1971 and defected to the Nine Network where he worked on NWS-9's current affairs program Newsbeat. Although Hale considered the journalism "incredibly tabloid", he also described it as "sort of fun". Hale returned to the ABC in 1973 when he commenced hosting Saturday Week over the summer period while Four Corners was off the air.

In 1978, Hale relocated to Sydney when he was appointed as the host of the national edition of This Day Tonight but it was axed later that same year. Hale was then the national host of the replacement program Nationwide when it began broadcasting in 1979. He would present the common stories broadcast across Australia with a state-based presenter presenting local current affairs stories. Hale said it was during this period he pitched ideas to the ABC about producing programs about visual arts but to no avail.

In 1982, Hale temporarily relocated to Japan where he spent twelve months working at NHK, advising them on news and current affairs. In 1988, Hale hosted an hour of highlights from the Australian Bicentenary to 125 countries via satellite which he considered to possibly be his "proudest ABC moment".

In 1990, Hale became the national presenter of the ABC's first late night news service on ABC TV. Hale continued in this role until 1995 when he was replaced by Indira Naidoo. Despite media reports to the contrary, Hale volunteered to leave the role when he was offered the job to host another series of the antiques show For Love or Money. Hale also read the weekend news in NSW.

Happy that he finally persuaded the ABC to do a program surrounding decorative arts, Hale hosted For Love or Money for three seasons from 1987 with regular panelists such as antique dealer Peter Cook.

He returned to Adelaide before his retirement in 1997. Upon his retirement in 1997, Hale said he was looking forward to enjoying many aspects of life in Sydney and exploring his interest in information technology, multimedia and the internet as well as travel and antiques.

Hale developed an interest in computer art after buying an Apple Macintosh computer in 1985.

=== Death ===
Hale died of cancer in 2005 and was survived by his wife economist Helen Lapsley and son Tony.
