= Jeff Watson (journalist) =

British-born Australian journalist (1942–2023)

Jeffrey Watson
- Born: 1942; Castle Bromwich, West Midlands, England
- Died: 22 February 2023 (aged 80); Sydney, Australia
- Occupation: Journalist
- Known for: Being a television reporter and documentary maker
- Television: This Day Tonight; Four Corners; Holiday; Towards 2000; Beyond 2000; Getaway

Jeffrey Watson (1942 – 22 February 2023) was a British-born Australian journalist, author and documentary filmmaker.

Watson is perhaps best known for his work on science programs Towards 2000 and Beyond 2000 as well as travel shows Holiday and Getaway.

He also had an interest in aviation, producing numerous documentaries on the subject.

== Early life ==
Watson was born in late 1942 at Castle Bromwich, near Birmingham in England. His father owned a small factory which made small parts for the Spitfire.

Watson's ambitions of becoming a pilot were quashed when he suffered a detached retina after he was injured when a snowball containing a rock was thrown at him during his childhood.

Turning to a career in journalism, Watson commenced working at Berrow's Worcester Journal.

== Career in Australia ==
Watson's television career in Australia commenced in the 1970s as a reporter for ABC TV current affairs programs This Day Tonight and Four Corners.

In 1977 and 1978, Watson was a reporter for the ABC's travel show Holiday hosted by Bill Peach.

In 1978, Watson worked as a producer on the Nine Network's new public affairs program 60 Minutes.

He returned to the ABC in early 1979 as the host of Statewide. Later that year, Watson filmed a television pilot for a new science and technology show which was given the working title of Today Tomorrow which Watson later described as "awfully dull". It was later renamed Towards 2000 and became a success for the ABC with the original four seasons airing between 1981 and 1984.

After the ABC decided not to continue with the show, preferring to establish another science program called Quantum, Towards 2000 was reworked for the Seven Network. The show was renamed to Beyond 2000 with Watson continuing on as a reporter. Watson was praised for his entertaining and passionate style of reporting, which drew comparisons to "The Nutty Professor" in the media.

In 1990, Watson rejoined the Nine Network to work as the executive producer of Clive Robertson's late night news program, The World Tonight.

Watson became one of the foundation reporters for Nine's new travel show Getaway, introducing the program's first episode in 1992. He continued with Getaway until he left at the end of 1998 and was succeeded by Ben Dark.

=== Aviation documentaries ===
Throughout his career, Watson produced and presented many documentaries relating to the aviation field as well as writing a number of books on the subject.

In 1989, Watson established a production company called Jeff Watson Productions, although he admitted the company consisted of "just me and the cat".

The first documentary he produced under Jeff Watson Productions was Spitfire Over Australia in 1989. Watson subsequently produced further documentaries including a 1999 biographical film about Sidney Cotton.

In 2007, Watson produced a documentary called Southend to Sydney – The Return of the 707 which featured him flying from England to Australia with John Travolta following the restoration of a 50-year-old Qantas Boeing 707.

Watson's aviation documentaries include:

- Spitfire Over Australia (1989)
- Confederate Airforce (1991)
- Kittyhawk (1991)
- Classic Aeroplanes (1996)
- The Last Plane Out Of Berlin (1999)
- Southend to Sydney – The Return of the 707 (2007)
- The Boneyard (2007)
- The Shape of Things To Come (2007)

== Awards ==
In 1992, Watson was awarded the Ordre national du Mérite for his services to science journalism.

== Death and legacy ==
In 2018, Watson was diagnosed with brain cancer and was given just three months to live.

He died at the age of 80 on 22 February 2023 at a palliative care facility in Greenwich. His funeral was held at the Anglican church in Mona Vale on 2 March 2023.

His death prompted various tributes from those in the media and former colleagues. ABC broadcaster Phillip Adams described Watson as a "major figure in the history of the ABC" while Getaway reporter Catriona Rowntree remembered him as someone who was a "joy to be with" and as someone who had had an encyclopedic knowledge of all things related to aviation.

In a report about his death, the Australian Broadcasting Corporation credited Watson with being a man who "helped pioneer popular science television in Australia."
