= Michael Willesee Jr. =

Australian television journalist

- Education: Charles Sturt University
- Occupations: Journalist; TV presenter production company founder
- Spouse: Allison Langdon
- Family: Don Willesee (grandfather); Michael Willesee (father); Terry Willesee (uncle); Janet Shaw (cousin)

Michael Willesee Jr. is an Australian television journalist, who has worked in both print journalism and broadcasting.

== Early life ==
Willesee is the son of the late Australian journalist Mike Willesee and brother of fellow journalist Amy Willesee. Their mother was Willesee senior's first wife and former Miss Australia, Joan Stanbury. Through his uncle, journalist and broadcaster Terry, the late author and cyclist Janet Shaw was his cousin.

Michael graduated from Charles Sturt University at the end of 1988, and joined Mojo Advertising where he worked closely with some of the giants of the industry including Alan Morris and Allan Johnston.

== Career ==
Willesee began his career in journalism with The Australian newspaper in 1990. After completing his cadetship he moved to Los Angeles in 1991, freelancing for Sydney's The Sun-Herald newspaper as well as various US magazines.

Later that year, he moved into television, working on the tabloid news television program Hard Copy, produced by Paramount Television.

In 1992, Willesee moved to New York, where he joined the US version of A Current Affair at Fox Television, and again filing stories for Australian TV. Later that year he returned to Australia and accepted a role with the Nine Network reporting for National Nine News before joining A Current Affair where he worked until late 1998.

Michael then moved behind the camera, running a production company specialising in documentaries. His award-winning films covered diverse subjects including remote African tribes, true crime, religious phenomena and dangerous animals.

In March 2014, Michael resigned from Sky News Australia to take up a job in the office of Treasurer Joe Hockey.

In July 2026, Willesee returned to the Nine Network as a fill‑in co‑host on Today.

== Personal life ==
On 26 August 2007, Michael announced his engagement to Nine Network's 60 Minutes program reporter Allison Langdon and they later married in 2008.

The couple had a son in January 2017, followed by a daughter in March 2019.
