= Peter Luck =

Australian TV presenter & writer (1944–2017)

- Born: Peter Anthony Luck; 5 January 1944; Adelaide, South Australia, Australia
- Died: 6 September 2017 (aged 73); Concord, New South Wales, Australia
- Occupations: TV journalist; author; producer; presenter
- Years active: 1967–2009

Peter Anthony Luck (5 January 1944 – 6 September 2017) was an Australian author, TV journalist, producer and presenter.

== Career ==
As a television personality, among the shows he worked on were This Day Tonight, Four Corners, Sunday, Inside Edition and Today Tonight, Bicentennial Minutes … A Time to Remember, This Fabulous Century, The Australians, 50 Fantastic Years and Where Are They Now?.

This Fabulous Century was a 37-part series produced by the Seven Network, after Luck's previous employer, the Australian Broadcasting Corporation had declined, believing that a series that relied so heavily on black-and-white film, when the country had only recently switched to colour television, would not be successful. It was shown on Sunday nights on Seven, and became the hit of 1979.

== Personal life ==
Peter Luck was raised in Adelaide, South Australia, and attended Findon High School. Luck was married to Penny for 43 years, and they had a son and daughter. Luck suffered a stroke which left him with limited speech and physical incapacity.

== Death ==
Luck died on 6 September 2017 at Concord Repatriation General Hospital. He had cancer and Parkinson's disease when he died.

== Discography ==
=== Studio albums ===
| Title | Album details | Peak chart positions |
| Title | Album details | AUS |
|---|---|---|
| And The Word Was Gough (with Michael Carlton) | Released November 1975; Format: LP; Label: M7 (MLF-107) | 55 |
