= Carols by Candlelight =

Annual Christmas song event in Australia

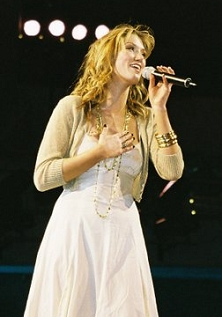
- Delta Goodrem appears during the 2006 Carols by Candlelight rehearsal
- Genre: Christmas
- Dates: 24 December (Christmas Eve)
- Locations: Sidney Myer Music Bowl, Melbourne, Victoria, Australia
- Years active: 1938–present
- Founder: Norman Banks
- Website: carols.visionaustralia.org

Carols by Candlelight is an annual Australian Christmas tradition that was popularised in Melbourne in 1938. The tradition has since spread around the world. It involves people gathering, usually outdoors in a park, to sing carols by candlelight, featuring live performances by both national and international celebrities accompanied by a symphony orchestra.

== Vision Australia's Carols by Candlelight ==
Vision Australia's Carols by Candlelight is the oldest Carols by Candlelight event in Australia.

== History ==
=== Early history and Cornish–Moonta origins ===
In the mid to late nineteenth century, the copper-mining settlement of Moonta, on South Australia’s Yorke Peninsula, became one of the most significant centres for Cornish emigrant miners in Australia. Large numbers of miners and their families from Cornwall brought not only their labour and mining technology, but also their rich cultural and religious traditions — including Methodism, choral singing, and the celebration of Christmas carols. The Moonta region was even dubbed “Australia’s Little Cornwall” in recognition of this strong Cornish imprint.

Within that context, local accounts and heritage references suggest that at Christmas-Eve gatherings the Cornish miners in Moonta would assemble outdoors — sometimes at mine sites — with candles affixed to their hats, and sing carols by candlelight. The Yorke’s Peninsula Advertiser recorded in December 1882 that “Christmas Eve was celebrated by parties of miners singing carols through the night in the township and along the mines,” providing one of the earliest documented examples of this custom in the region. Later recollections in The Mail described that Cornish miners “sang ‘curls’ [carols] by the light of fatjacks (tallow candles) stuck on their hats with wet clay,” highlighting the enduring memory of the candle-lit gatherings.

Over time the practice of communal carol-singing by candlelight in parks and public spaces was popularised in major cities — notably in Melbourne in 1938, when radio announcer Norman Banks organised the first large-scale Carols by Candlelight, and in Adelaide during the 1940s, where the tradition was adopted as a charity event. The narrative of the Moonta and Cornish origins situates those later large-scale events within a cultural lineage of outdoor Christmas song gatherings, rooted in immigrant community traditions.

While direct documentary evidence linking a continuous chain from the nineteenth-century Moonta gatherings to the modern nationwide Carols by Candlelight events remains limited, the Cornish–Moonta story is widely referenced in local histories and cultural heritage accounts of South Australia. For example, the State Library of South Australia notes that “in nineteenth-century Moonta, Cornish miners with candles on their hats would gather to sing carols on Christmas Eve.” As such, the Moonta tradition adds a valuable local dimension to understanding how communal carol-singing in outdoor candle-lit settings became part of Australian Christmas culture.

=== History ===
Carols by Candlelight, held in Melbourne, Victoria, was introduced in 1938 by radio announcer Norman Banks, of Melbourne radio station 3KZ. Whilst walking home from his night-time radio shift on Christmas Eve in 1937, he passed a window and saw an elderly woman sitting up in bed inside listening to Away in a Manger being played on the radio and singing along with her face being lit by candlelight. Wondering how many others spent Christmas alone, he had the idea to gather a large group of people to all sing Christmas carols together by candlelight. The first ever event was held in Alexandra Gardens the following Christmas in 1938, and was attended by around 10,000 people.

Following World War II, the Carols became so well patronised that the decision was made to move it to the neighbouring park in Kings Domain. In 1959, the newly constructed Sidney Myer Music Bowl provided a permanent venue, where they are still held more than 60 years on as of 2023.

Funds raised from donations, ticket, and candle sales are given to Vision Australia (formerly the Royal Victorian Institute for the Blind, (RVIB)). However, originally, all profits went to the Austin Hospital. During World War II the Red Cross and the Australian Comforts Fund joined the Austin Hospital as co-recipients, and in the immediate post-war era the RVIB received funds, as did the Austin Hospital.

In recent years, the dress rehearsal on 23 December has become open to the public. Tickets to the event are cheaper than the main event, while funds raised still go towards Vision Australia. The event has become almost as popular as the main event in recent years.

Due to the ongoing COVID-19 pandemic, there were no crowds for the 2020 event; it was the first time no crowds were allowed since its 1938 inception. Crowds were allowed in 2021, but all attendees (10,000 people) needed to have had the COVID vaccination.

=== Hosts and broadcast ===
The event was originally hosted by its founder Melbourne sports broadcaster Norman Banks and broadcast live over radio station 3KZ.

The 1956 Carols By Candlelight was the first to be broadcast on television, as part of GTV9's pre-launch test transmission, with 3KZ maintaining a separate radio broadcast of the event.

When Banks left 3KZ in 1952, Philip Gibbs became host. During the time that Gibbs was hosting, the program became a radio/TV simulcast on 3KZ and ATV-0, with ATV-0's first telecast in 1969, extending to other stations across the 0-10 Network (now Network Ten). From 1979 it was telecast nationally through the Nine Network. Later radio broadcast partners included 3MP, 3AW and 3EE and across the Macquarie Radio Network as well as Vision Australia's own national radio network. The event was also previously linked to Ray Martin, who hosted the carols for 18 years. The event is also broadcast and telecast live to eastern Asia, many Pacific Islands and New Zealand.

Years	Hosts	Broadcaster	Television
1938–1951	Norman Banks	3KZ	GTV-9 (1956)
1952–1968	Philip Gibbs	3KZ	GTV-9 (1956)
1969–1971	Philip Gibbs	3KZ	Network Ten
1979–1987	Brian Naylor	3AW	Nine Network
1988–2007	Ray Martin	3AW	Nine Network
1999	Glenn Ridge and Jennifer Keyte	3AW	Nine Network
2008–2012	Lisa Wilkinson and Karl Stefanovic	3AW	Nine Network
2013–2016	Lisa Wilkinson and David Campbell	3AW	Nine Network
2017–2018	Sonia Kruger and David Campbell	3AW	Nine Network
2019	Allison Langdon and David Campbell	3AW	Nine Network
2020	Livinia Nixon and Eddie McGuire	3AW	Nine Network
2021	Allison Langdon and David Campbell	3AW	Nine Network
2022	Brooke Boney and David Campbell	3AW	Nine Network
2023, 2025–present	Sarah Abo and David Campbell	3AW	Nine Network
2024	David Campbell (Note: Abo was originally announced to co-host alongside David Campbell, but due to illness Campbell was instead joined by a selection of performers who rotated as special guest co-hosts.)	3AW	Nine Network

Host	Broadcast																																					
Host	1988–99											2000–present																										
Host	88	89	90	91	92	93	94	95	96	97	98	99	00	01	02	03	04	05	06	07	08	09	10	11	12	13	14	15	16	17	18	19	20	21	22	23	24	25
Ray Martin																																						
Lisa Wilkinson																																						
Karl Stefanovic																																						
David Campbell																																						
Sonia Kruger																																						
Allison Langdon																																						
Livinia Nixon																																						
Eddie McGuire																																						
Brooke Boney																																						
Sarah Abo																																						

=== Performers ===
Performers for the event vary from year to year. Regular performers include David Hobson, Marina Prior, Silvie Paladino, Denis Walter and Anthony Callea. Australian children's band Hi-5 headlined children's segments from 1999 to 2017. Nine Network stars have starred in the event in recent years. Contestants from The Voice Australia have also starred in the event from 2012 to 2020.

The Vision Australia's Carols by Candlelight Choir, Australian Girls Choir and National Boys Choir of Australia appear on the show each year as supporting acts in numerous of the performances.

In 1938, the massed choirs were led by Horace Stevens, who was followed in the position by Max Balderson. Since 1988, Douglas Heywood has held the position of Choral Director.

The long-serving musical director from 1984 to 2002 was Geoff Harvey. Since 2003, John Foreman has filled the position.

In earlier years, Carols by Candlelight had a strong classical music theme, and a noticeable religious influence. The Sun Aria winner for each year was automatically invited to sing at Carols by Candlelight. However, since the 1960s, the program has certainly moved toward popular culture.

Ray Martin holds the record for hosting the most Carols by Candlelight shows, from 1988 to 2007. He sang at only one show, in 1996, when he sang Harry Connick Jr's "When My Heart Finds Christmas".

== Other carols events ==
Most cities and towns in Australia hold a night-time carols event in the lead-up to Christmas.

=== Sydney ===
Carols in the Domain have been held annually since 1983, originally on the last Saturday evening before Christmas Eve, and on the last Sunday evening before Christmas Eve since 2016. They are televised in Australia and sometimes in other countries.

=== Brisbane ===
Carols in the City is held on Riverstage in the Brisbane Botanic Gardens and on television throughout Queensland.

=== Perth ===
In Perth, Carols by Candlelight are held in mid-December at the Supreme Court Gardens, while other events are held at Fremantle, Scarborough and Rockingham. In 2012, Suzie Mathers performed during the IGA Carols by Candlelight in Perth

=== Adelaide ===
In Adelaide, Carols by Candlelight has been held since 1944 in Elder Park on the banks of the River Torrens. In 2012, 30,000 people witnessed the event.

In the Adelaide suburb of Modbury, the annual Civic Park Carols attracts the second biggest crowd of its type (community) in Australia, with about 40,000 people attending the seventh edition in 2018.

=== Hobart ===
In Hobart, due to the urban nature of the city, there are two main carols services. One in Clarence and the main ceremony is held at Tolosa Park Glenorchy by Variety - the Children's Charity of Tasmania.

=== Canberra ===
In Canberra the annual Carols by Candlelight is held in Commonwealth Park on Stage 88. 2019 will be its 75th occurrence. This is the second longest-running Carols in a capital city. It is a traditional Carols with community singing of carols led by Woden Valley Youth Choir and one of the local bands such as Canberra City Band. Guest Artists are featured - usually drawn from the local community. Donations are collected for a local charity with $14,180 raised in 2012 for the Snowy Hydro Southcare Helicopter service. In 2011 Auslan interpreters started to provide interpretation for members of the regional deaf community

=== Darwin ===
Carols by Candlelight is held at the George Brown Darwin Botanic Gardens each year, raising money for charity.

=== Around Victoria ===
- Carols in the Park is held annually in North Balwyn. In 2011 it moved to Macleay Park, North Balwyn. In 2012, 10,000 people attended the celebration in Victoria.
- Carols at Como Park is held annually in South Yarra by the City of Stonnington.
- Denis Walter's Carols by the Bay is held on the first Saturday of December in Geelong. It is held at Eastern Beach and is a free event.
- The City of Monash organises the large annual Carols by Candlelight event in Jells Park, hosted by Pete Smith. It has attracted up to 25,000 people and has been running for over 25 years.
- In the City of Yarra a large Carols by Candlelight event has recently been held in the Abbotsford Convent gardens.
- In the City of Manningham a large Carols by Candlelight event is held annually in Ruffey Lake Park.
- In Werribee, there is the annual City of Wyndham Carols held on the lawns at the historic Werribee Park Mansion. This event takes place on the second week of December.

=== Other ===
- In Newcastle, New South Wales, Carols by Candlelight are held in mid-December at King Edward Park in the city near the beach.
- In the City of Lake Macquarie, Carols are held each year at Speers Point Park in mid-December on the edge of Lake Macquarie.
- In Alice Springs, Carols by Candlelight are held in early December at Traeger Park Oval.

== See also ==
- Christian music in Australia
