= Ian MacDougall =

Australian naval admiral (1938–2020)

- Born: 23 February 1938; Sydney, New South Wales, Australia
- Died: 1 July 2020 (aged 82); Burnie, Tasmania, Australia
- Military career
- Allegiance: Australia
- Branch: Royal Australian Navy
- Service years: 1954–1994
- Rank: Vice Admiral
- Commands: Chief of Naval Staff (1991–94); Maritime Commander Australia (1989–90); HMAS Platypus (1985–86); HMAS Supply (1980–82); HMAS Hobart (1979); HMAS Onslow (1971–73); HMS Otter (1969–71)
- Awards: Companion of the Order of Australia; Australian Fire Service Medal; Knight Grand Cross of the Order of the Crown of Thailand
- Other work: Commissioner of New South Wales Fire Brigades (1994–2003)

Vice Admiral Ian Donald George MacDougall, AC, AFSM (23 February 1938 – 1 July 2020) was a senior commander of the Royal Australian Navy (RAN), who served as Chief of Naval Staff from 1991 to 1994. He also served as Commissioner of New South Wales Fire Brigades from 1994 to 2003 and was Patron of the Submarines Association Australia.

== Early life ==
MacDougall was born in Sydney, New South Wales, on 23 February 1938 to James MacDougall and his wife, Eileen (née Stanbridge). In 1954, MacDougall entered the Royal Australian Naval College at Jervis Bay as a 15-year-old cadet midshipman.

== Career ==
MacDougall went on to command the submarines HMS Otter and HMAS Onslow, the guided missile destroyer HMAS Hobart and the fleet tanker HMAS Supply. He became Director of Submarine Policy in 1982, Commander of the submarine base HMAS Platypus in 1985 and Director General of Joint Operations and Plans for the Australian Defence Force in 1986. He was appointed Maritime Commander Australia in January 1989, Deputy Chief of Naval Staff in July 1990 and finally Chief of Naval Staff in March 1991. He was made a Companion of the Order of Australia in the 1993 Birthday Honours, and retired in March 1994.

On his retirement from the RAN, MacDougall was appointed Commissioner of New South Wales Fire Brigades. He fulfilled the role for nine years, being awarded the Australian Fire Service Medal in the Australia Day Honours of 2000. He retired to Tasmania in 2003. From 2003 to 2007, he was Independent Chairman of the board of the Co-operative Research Centre – Bushfires, and from 2005 to 2007 he was also Chairman of the Australian Veterans' Children Assistance Trust.

== Personal life ==
MacDougall was married to television journalist and presenter Sonia Humphrey from 1996 until she died in 2011. After his retirement from New South Wales Fire Brigades, MacDougall and Humphrey moved to Green Point near the town of Marrawah in north-west Tasmania.

MacDougall died on 1 July 2020.

== Notes ==
Military offices
| Preceded by Admiral Michael Hudson | Chief of the Naval Staff; 1991–1994 | Succeeded by Vice Admiral Rodney Taylor |
| Preceded by Rear Admiral Ken Doolan | Deputy Chief of Naval Staff; 1990–1991 | Succeeded by Rear Admiral Rodney Taylor |
| Preceded by Rear Admiral Peter Sinclair | Maritime Commander Australia; 1989–1990 | Succeeded by Rear Admiral Ken Doolan |
