= Graham Phillips (presenter) =

Australian television presenter

Graham Phillips is an Australian television presenter. Previously a member of the Catalyst team, he has also presented the technology programmes Beyond Tomorrow and Hot Chips.

== External links ==
- Graham Phillips at IMDb
- Catalyst biography
- Graham Phillips Website
