= Sarah Abo =

Australian television journalist

- Born: 8 November 1986 (age 39); Damascus, Syria
- Education: Monash University
- Occupations: Television presenter, journalist, reporter
- Years active: 2008–present
- Employer: Nine Network
- Television: 60 Minutes; Today
- Spouse: Cyrus Moran (m. 2012)
- Children: 1

Sarah Abo (born 8 November 1986) is an Australian television presenter, journalist and reporter.

Abo was co‑host of the Nine Network's breakfast program Today from 2023 to 2026 and was also a reporter for 60 Minutes.

== Early life and education ==
Abo was born on 8 November 1986 in Damascus, Syria, to Fouad and Samia, and has two younger sisters. In 1990, when she was four years of age, the family relocated to Melbourne, Australia.

She attended Our Lady of Mercy College in Heidelberg. Abo went on to graduate from Monash University in 2009 with a Bachelor of Arts (Honours), majoring in journalism.

== Career ==
Abo commenced her television career in 2008 at Network 10's Adelaide newsroom, where she initially worked as an archiving and production assistant, before becoming a Ten News reporter. After two years, Abo moved back to Melbourne, where she continued to work as a reporter for Network 10 for another three years.

In 2013, she commenced working for SBS Television as a presenter and reporter on programs such as SBS World News, Dateline, Insight, and Small Business Secrets. In 2014, Abo completed a fellowship at CNN in Atlanta, Georgia, United States. Abo was a presenter and journalist for SBS for the 2014 FIFA World Cup.

In 2019, Abo joined the Nine Network as a 60 Minutes reporter. She regularly filled in as co-host of Nine's breakfast show Today including in March 2022 when regular co-host Allison Langdon contracted COVID-19.

Abo was chosen to moderate the second leaders' debate between Scott Morrison and Anthony Albanese prior to the 2022 Australian federal election which aired on 8 May 2022. After the debate, Abo was the subject of a controversial tweet posted by Mark Latham, the New South Wales state leader of Pauline Hanson's One Nation, who seemingly used Abo's surname as a racial slur. Criticising Abo's performance as moderator, Latham said "never trust an Abo with something as important as that". The word "Abo" is a highly offensive reference to Aboriginal Australians. The Nine Network said that they intended to report Latham's comments to the authorities, while praising Abo's handling of the debate.

In November 2022, Abo was announced as the new co-host of the Nine Network's breakfast program Today in 2023, replacing Ally Langdon, who was appointed as the host of A Current Affair following the retirement of Tracy Grimshaw.

In December 2023, Nine announced that Abo would host Carols by Candlelight with David Campbell.

On 16 September 2026, Abo announced that she would leave Today and the Nine Network at the end of the year.

== Personal life ==
On 15 December 2012, Abo married Cyrus Moran.

On 11 March 2026, she announced on Today that she is pregnant. Abo also revealed that she had been through years of fertility struggles. Abo gave birth to a boy, Sonny, in July.
