= Helen Wellings =

Australian journalist and consumer advocate

Helen Wellings (AM)
- Born: Leeton, New South Wales
- Education: Monash University
- Occupations: Journalist, radio and television presenter, consumer advocate
- Employer: Seven Network

Helen Wellings AM is an Australian journalist and consumer advocate.

Wellings is currently a Consumer Editor for Seven News. She has been a senior reporter for the Seven Network for 20 years.

== Education and teaching career ==
Wellings has a Bachelor of Arts (majoring in Russian history) and a teaching diploma from Monash University. She worked as a secondary school teacher in Victoria for two years, teaching senior history and English.

== Consumer advocacy and television career ==
Wellings moved to Sydney in 1973, but was unable to work as a teacher as her files were lost by the Department of Education. Instead, she joined the New South Wales Department of Consumer Affairs to implement information programs on consumer rights as head of the department's education and publicity unit. In this role, she made numerous media appearances as a consumer expert on radio and television, including on ABC's This Day Tonight, The 7.30 Report and 2BL; Willesee and 11AM on Seven; The Midday Show and What'll They Think of Next? on the Nine Network; and 2GB radio.

In 1986, she was appointed by the ABC as the host of The Investigators, a new factual television series focused on consumer affairs and rights. The series was one of the ABC's highest-rating programs in its history, and ran for eleven years from 1985 to 1995, when it was cancelled.

After the cancellation of The Investigators, Wellings moved to the Seven Network where she was appointed host of Today Tonight, going on the work as the senior consumer affairs reporter for the program. After the cancellation of Today Tonight, she was appointed as a Consumer Editor for Seven News.

== Personal life ==
Wellings was born in Leeton, New South Wales. She was married to barrister Rod Weaver until 2006. She had one child, Nick Weaver, a musician, who died from cancer in 2021.

Wellings was appointed as a Member of the Order of Australia in the 2023 King's Birthday Honours for "significant service to the media, and to consumer affairs".
