= Leigh McClusky =

Australian journalist and presenter

Leigh Carol McClusky is an Australian journalist and presenter who has previously worked for Channel 7 in Adelaide. She held the presenter role of Today Tonight South Australia from 30 January 1995 to 17 August 2007.

== Career ==
She started her career as a cadet reporter for the Melbourne Herald in 1979. Since then, she has worked throughout the Australian media. McClusky was also a feature writer for the Australian Associated Press, as well as a researcher and reporter for the ABC program The Investigators. She has also worked on country newspapers and spent two years reporting with Channel Nine's A Current Affair.

In 1992, McClusky moved to Adelaide to present ABC's The 7.30 Report, which was state-based at the time.

When the program became national in 1995, Kerry O'Brien took the role of presenting the program. McClusky then moved to Channel Seven, where she started hosting the new state-based current affairs program Today Tonight, where she remained the anchor ever since the program started until August 2007.

== Personal life ==
McClusky gave birth to a son, Murdoch, in 2002 and a daughter, Sigourney, in 2006.

On 6 July 2007, McClusky announced that she would leave Today Tonight as she was expecting twins and would not return. It was speculated that the relief presenter Rosanna Mangiarelli would take over her role, which was confirmed by Seven on Sunday, 15 July 2007.

On 17 August, McClusky anchored her final show, which concluded with members of the TT and 7 News teams, her husband (Simon Haigh owner of Haigh's Chocolates), and children joining her on set. The following December, she gave birth to twins: a boy, Jock, and a girl, Tansy.

McClusky has started her own media and public relations business called McCo Group (formerly McClusky & Co) in Adelaide.
