= Ken Doolan =

Australian admiral

- Born: 15 January 1939 (age 87); Sydney, New South Wales
- Military career
- Allegiance: Australia
- Branch: Royal Australian Navy
- Service years: 1953–1993
- Rank: Rear Admiral
- Commands: Maritime Commander Australia (1990–91); Deputy Chief of Naval Staff (1989–90); HMAS Brisbane (1984–85); HMAS Tobruk (1980–81)
- Conflicts: Vietnam War; Gulf War
- Awards: Officer of the Order of Australia
- Other work: President of the Returned and Services League of Australia (2009–16); Chairman of the Australian War Memorial Council (2012–15)

Rear Admiral Kenneth Allan Doolan, AO (born 15 January 1939) is an Australian naval officer, author, and is the former national president of the Returned and Services League of Australia (RSL). He is a retired rear admiral in the Royal Australian Navy, his most senior commands being Maritime Commander Australia and operational commander of all Australian combatant forces deployed to the Gulf War.

== Early life ==
Doolan was born in Sydney, New South Wales, on 15 January 1939 and received his primary education in Brisbane, Queensland.

== Naval career ==
Doolan joined the Royal Australian Navy as a 13-year-old cadet midshipman in January 1953, attending the Royal Australian Naval College. He graduated in 1956, undertook sea training in the frigate HMAS Swan in 1957 and in December 1958 graduated from the Britannia Royal Naval College, Dartmouth, Devon.

Significant postings held during his 41-year naval career included:

- Aide-de-camp to Governor General Viscount De L’Isle, 1964–1965
- Military secretary to Governor General Lord Casey, 1965
- Direction officer destroyer HMAS Vampire during the Indonesian Confrontation, 1966
- Navigating officer, guided missile destroyer HMAS Perth during the Vietnam War, 1970–1971
- Canadian Forces Command and Staff College, 1980, including award of a Master Mariner’s Certificate
- Commissioning commanding officer, amphibious heavy lift ship HMAS Tobruk, 1981
- Commanding officer, guided missile destroyer HMAS Brisbane, 1984–1985
- Naval attaché, Washington DC, United States of America, 1987–1989
- Deputy chief of naval sta5ff, 1989–1990
- Maritime Commander Australia, 1990–1991, including being appointed operational commander of all Australian combatant forces deployed to the Gulf War
- Assistant chief of the defence force (development), 1991–1993 (retired)

== Second career ==
After leaving the Australian Defence Force, Doolan has been:

- Commissioner, Inquiry into the East Coast Armaments Complex, 1994–1996
- Member, Defence Force Remuneration Tribunal, 1996–1999
- National Secretary of the Order of Australia Association and Company Secretary of that Association’s Foundation, 2002–2005
- Member, National Defence Committee of the Returned and Services League, 2002 – 2009
- Established a book publishing company with his wife – Grinkle Press, 2006
- President, Australian Institute of Navigation, 2007–2009
- National President, Returned and Services League of Australia, 2009–2016

Doolan first came to public notice as national president of the RSL in late September 2009 when he made statements in support of Breeanna Till, the pregnant widow of an Australian serviceman Sergeant Brett Till who was killed in the War in Afghanistan on Operation Slipper in early 2009.

== Inquiries in 2017 ==
In 2017 Doolan became caught up in inquiries into the financial affairs of the RSL, both during the period when an RSL member, Don Rowe, was the president of the NSW branch and also during Doolan's own period as national president. One allegation, under investigation in September 2017, was that Doolan had taken steps to cover up the case of alleged financial dealings which had benefitted Rowe. Separately, in September 2017 the RSL national board launched an investigation into whether Doolan himself had, in June 2016, accepted a car worth nearly $40,000 as a retirement gift paid for out of RSL funds.

== Family ==
Doolan is married to Elaine. They live in rural New South Wales near the national capital, Canberra, Australian Capital Territory.

== Publications ==
- Maritime Power in the 20th Century – The Australian Experience Chapter 13, Allen & Unwin, 1998
- A commanding presence: the life of G.H. Barker bookseller, naturalist and ornithologist, Ginninderra Press, 2002
- We Were Cadet Midshipmen – RANC Entrants 50 Years On (contributor & publisher), Grinkle Press, 2006
- HMAS Tobruk: warship for every crisis, Grinkle Press, 2007
- Steel Cat: the story of HMAS Brisbane: Vietnam and Gulf War veteran, Grinkle Press, 2009

Military offices
Preceded by Rear Admiral Ian MacDougall	Maritime Commander Australia; 1990–1991	Succeeded by Rear Admiral Robert Walls
Preceded by Rear Admiral Peter Sinclair	Deputy Chief of Naval Staff; 1989–1990	Succeeded by Rear Admiral Ian MacDougall
Non-profit organization positions
Preceded by General Peter Cosgrove	Chairman of the Australian War Memorial Council; 2012–2015	Succeeded by Kerry Stokes
