= Sam Lipski =

Australian journalist

Sam Lipski AO
- Born: Samuel Lipski; 1938 (age 87–88)
- Education: University of Melbourne
- Occupations: Executive; TV producer; reporter; writer
- Known for: Reporter and columnist: The Age; The Australian; The Bulletin; The Sydney Morning Herald Four Corners as Executive producer; This Day Tonight

Samuel Lipski AO (born 1938) is an Australian journalist.

== Early life and education ==
Lipski was born in 1938. He was educated at University High School, Melbourne, the Institute for Youth Leadership, Jerusalem, and the University of Melbourne, where he graduated with the degree of Bachelor of Arts.

== Career ==
Lipski has been editor-in-chief of the Australian Jewish News and has worked as a reporter and columnist for The Age, The Australian, The Bulletin and The Sydney Morning Herald. He was also Washington correspondent for the Jerusalem Post, as well as The Australian.

He has also worked at a senior level in television, both for Channel 9 Melbourne and with the Australian Broadcasting Corporation where he was executive producer of Four Corners and founding producer of This Day Tonight.

He is chief executive of the Melbourne-based philanthropic Pratt Foundation and a former president of the State Library of Victoria. He was a commentator on Melbourne radio station 3AW.

== Awards ==
In 1993 Lipski was awarded Membership of the Order of Australia (AM) for services to the media; in 2020 he was promoted to Officer of the Order of Australia (AO), "For distinguished service to the community through the promotion of strategic philanthropy, to education, and to Australia-Israel relations." Lipski was awarded a Centenary medal and in 2008 was awarded an honorary Doctor of Laws from Monash University.

== Personal life ==
He lives in Melbourne and has three children.
