= Hayden Turner =

Australian zookeeper and wildlife television presenter

Hayden James Turner
- Career
- Show: Earth Pulse, Go Wild, Out There
- Station: National Geographic Channel
- Country: Australia

Hayden James Turner (born 16 February 1966) is an Australian zookeeper and wildlife television presenter.

== Life ==
Turner was born in Sydney, Australia and is a wildlife television presenter known for his work for the National Geographic Channel. He works alongside experienced television crews, leading producers, and directors; and has co-produced several of his programs.

Since 2011, Turner has travelled extensively throughout the African continent and to over 35 countries. He has worked with numerous species and specializes in the husbandry of African mammals.

Turner also runs programs and delivers talks for zoos and schools.

== Television ==
Turner resigned from his ten-year job as a senior keeper at Taronga Zoo, Sydney, to visit Africa and work on volunteer conservation projects. Before his departure, he took a party of VIPs on a behind-the-scenes tour. In one of the groups was Bryan Smith, general manager of National Geographic Channel in Australia. Impressed by the passion and depth of knowledge Turner displayed and struck by his unique presentation skills, Smith asked him if he'd be interested in taking a digital video camera to Africa to record his adventures.

Turner appeared in a Play School episode in 1993 as a zookeeper when they visited the Taronga Zoo.

== Career highlights ==
- Former senior zoo keeper, Taronga Zoo Sydney 1990-1998.
- Former reporter: Earth Pulse, Go Wild, Out There, National Geographic Channel.
- Presenter: Turner's Video Postcards National Geographic Channel.
- Presenter: Green Car, National Geographic Channel.
- Presenter: Hayden Turner's Wildlife Challenge, National Geographic Channel.
- Presenter: Beyond Tomorrow.
- Presenter: WildEarth.tv.
