= The Investigators (Australian TV series) =

- Genre: Consumer affairs
- Presented by: Sonia Humphrey (1985–86); Helen Wellings (1987–1995)
- Country of origin: Australia
- Original language: English
- No. of series: 11

Production
- Production company: Australian Broadcasting Corporation

Original release
- Network: ABC TV
- Release: 6 March 1985 – 14 November 1995

The Investigators is an Australian consumer affairs television series, which aired on the ABC from 1985 to 1995.

The program's host and chief reporter was Helen Wellings, who replaced original host Sonia Humphrey in 1987. Other reporters who worked on the program include foreign correspondent Eric Campbell, politician Sarah Henderson, reporter Leigh McClusky, and radio presenter Jon Faine.

The Investigators was one of the ABC's highest-rating programs, and presenter Helen Wellings claimed the program received an average of 500 complaints per week from consumers about products or services.

The program won the 1993 Logie Award for Most Outstanding Achievement in Public Affairs.

The program was cancelled in 1995, as a result of cost-cutting measures at the ABC which included the axing of the state-based editions of The 7.30 Report.
