= Quentin Kenihan =

Australian actor and disability advocate (1975–2018)

- Born: 27 February 1975; Melbourne, Victoria, Australia
- Died: 6 October 2018 (aged 43); Adelaide, South Australia, Australia
- Occupations: Disability advocate, actor
- Notable work: Mad Max: Fury Road

Quentin Kenihan (27 February 1975 – 6 October 2018) was an Australian disability advocate, writer and actor. He was born with osteogenesis imperfecta, a rare bone disease.

Kenihan was born in Box Hill, a suburb of Melbourne, Victoria, in 1975 and first came to the attention of the public aged seven when he was the feature of a documentary by Australian journalist Mike Willesee. He later was the host of a Ten Network television show Quentin Crashes. In 2016, Kenihan participated in a lengthy television interview with Ray Martin.

He appeared in the 2015 film Mad Max: Fury Road in the role of Corpus Colossus. Kenihan died in Adelaide on 6 October 2018. His suspected cause of death was an asthma attack.

== Politics ==
At the time of his death, Kenihan had nominated to stand as a councillor for the City of Adelaide elections on 9 November 2018. His name appeared on the ballot paper, but votes for him were not counted and were allocated to the next-preferenced candidate. The Quentin Kenihan Inclusive Playspace will be a disability-accessible playground built in his memory in Rymill Park.

== Filmography ==
Year	Title	Role
2004	Thunderstruck	Van Man
2005	You and Your Stupid Mate	Hot Pants 69
2007	Dr. Plonk	Man on Trolley
2015	Mad Max: Fury Road	Corpus Colossus

== Published works ==
- Kenihan, Kerry (1985). Quentin. Ringwood: Penguin. ISBN 978-0140070088.
- Kenihan, Quentin (2016). Quentin: Not All Superheroes Wear Capes. Sydney: Hachette Australia. ISBN 9780733635359.
