= David Richardson (Australian journalist) =

Australian journalist (21st century)

David Richardson is an Australian journalist who has been with the Seven Network for more than 30 years, 23 years with Today Tonight. As a senior investigative journalist he has broken numerous stories as well as covering national and international events. He now leads a small team from Sydney for Today Tonight.

== Early career ==
- Graduated from the journalism school at the University of South Australia
- Recipient of Pater Award for "Professional Excellence in Radio Arts and Sciences"
- Recipient of Thorn Award for "Best Current Affairs Report"
- Cliff Neville Award – Outstanding Team Player

== Notable reports ==
=== Gulf War and Operation Iraqi Freedom ===
David was one of the lead reporters for Network Seven during Operation Iraqi Freedom, reporting on activity in Kuwait City during the conflict.

=== Man Monis Investigation ===
Before Man Monis was involved in the infamous Sydney Siege he was initially investigated by David Richardson. In the inquiry into the Siege ABC reported, "Channel 7 reporter David Richardson said after he did a 2009 television story about Monis sending letters to the families of Australian soldiers, Monis complained to the Australian Communications and Media Authority who dismissed his complaint."

Mr Richardson said Monis "was never shy". The inquest was told that Monis sent the letters to funeral parlours and one was delivered at a funeral of an Australian soldier. Network Seven's six-month investigation found no official confirmation from the Iranian community that Monis was even a real sheik.

== Controversies ==
=== "In Barcelona Tonight" Hoax ===
In November 1996, Media Watch (TV program) revealed that Today Tonight had fabricated a report about disgraced Australian businessman and former Seven Network owner Christopher Skase. While Richardson claimed that he was chased out of Majorca by corrupt police acting on behalf of Skase, Media Watch showed that the footage was shot in Barcelona, not Majorca, and "police" Richardson was passing were in fact the Guàrdia Urbana de Barcelona setting up roadblocks to control traffic flow in the city centre.

=== Defamation case ===
After a five-year court battle in July 2009, the Seven Network was ordered to pay mortgage broker Peter Mahommed $240,000 after a 2004 Today Tonight report by Richardson was found to have falsely portrayed him as having "fleeced" a dementia patient of $1 million.

== See also ==
- Seven Network
- Today Tonight
