= Beyond Tomorrow (TV series) =

- Beyond Tomorrow opening sequence title
- Also known as: Towards 2000 (1981–1984); Beyond 2000 (1985–1995, 1999)
- Created by: Judith John-Story; David Summons; Carmel Travers
- Starring: Beyond 2000: Sonia Humphrey; Carmel Travers; Chris Ardill-Guinness; Amanda Keller; Andrew Carroll; Maxine Gray; Anthony Griffis; Dr Caroline West; Dr John D'Arcy; Jeffrey Watson; Simon Nasht; Sharon Nash; Simon Reeve; Iain Finlay; Bryan Smith; Beyond Tomorrow: Matt Shirvington; Graham Phillips; Hayden Turner; Anna Choy; Dr Caroline West; Sara Groen; Kim Watkins
- Composer: Neil Sutherland
- Country of origin: Australia
- Original language: English
- No. of episodes: Beyond 2000: 475; Beyond Tomorrow: 50

Production
- Executive producers: Lloyd Capps – creator Towards 2000 (1981–84) Beyond 2000 Peter Abbott (1985–1993); John Hosking (1993–1996); David Alrich (2005–2006)
- Camera setup: Single-camera (1981–1993); Multi-camera (1993–2006)
- Running time: Approx 42 minutes

Original release
- Network: ABC (1981–1984); Seven Network (1985–1993); Network Ten (1993–1995, 1999)
- Release: 27 July 1985
- Release: 1 June 2005 – 30 August 2006

Beyond Tomorrow is an Australian science and technology television series produced by Beyond Television Productions. It began airing in 1981 as Towards 2000, then in 1985 was renamed Beyond 2000, a name the show kept until its cancellation in 1999. It then started airing again in 2005 for approximately a year, with the name Beyond Tomorrow.

== Towards 2000 and Beyond 2000 ==
Towards 2000 debuted on the ABC in 1981 as a half-hour show dedicated to showcasing developments and inventions in science and technology. Original presenters were Jeffrey Watson, Sonia Humphrey and David Flatman. There were four series of the program (1981, 82, 83 and 84) and it was a popular and high rating success on the national broadcaster. After production finished on the 4th series, the ABC decided not to continue with Towards 2000, and instead started up a new science program, named Quantum, under the newly appointed Dick Gilling from BBCTV.

The Towards 2000 reporters then spoke with Ted Thomas, General Manager of ATN 7, who agreed that his network could start a new hour long production and name it Beyond 2000, airing until 1993 when it was picked up by Network Ten, airing until 1999. Beyond 2000 was also broadcast internationally, airing on the Discovery Channel in the United States and Canada, on RTÉ in the Republic of Ireland, and on the satellite channel Sky News in Europe and on TVNZ in New Zealand. An American-produced version of the show also aired on the Discovery Channel in 1992, with an American presenter (Henry Tenenbaum, presently an anchor/reporter for television station KRON San Francisco) used for the studio segments. An American version entitled Beyond Tomorrow was hosted by newsman Dave Marash and aired in the early years of the Fox television network.

Fourteen series of Towards/Beyond 2000 were produced, with the last being made in 1999 as a one-off, after a production break of about four years. At this point, the rising cost of producing the series, coupled with increased competition from other science and technology shows forced the cancellation of the show.

A Beyond 2000 website was published by the same company between 1999 and 2003. This provided science and technology news, as well as video clips from the old TV shows. The website was eliminated in a round of company-wide budget cuts that reflected a general downturn in the Australian media industry at the time.

=== Presenters ===
- Sonia Humphrey
- Iain Finlay
- Jeff Watson
- David Flatman
- Carmel Travers
- Chris Ardill-Guinness
- Simon Reeve
- Amanda Keller
- Andrew Carroll
- Maxine Gray
- Anthony Griffis
- Dr Caroline West
- Dr John D'Arcy
- Simon Nasht
- Sharon Nash
- Bryan Smith
- Tracey Curro
- Andrew Waterworth
- American versions were presented by Henry Tenenbaum, Dave Marash and Susan Hunt.

== Beyond Tomorrow ==
In 2005, Beyond 2000 returned to the Seven Network under the new name of Beyond Tomorrow, with the first episode airing on 1 June 2005. Picking up where its predecessor left off, Beyond Tomorrow delved even deeper into the world of technological innovations and scientific breakthroughs in all areas of life including the environment, medicine, sport, computers, space, agriculture, transport, architecture, leisure and adventure. Topics ranged from how probes planted in the brain could be used to battle Parkinson's disease and obsessive compulsive disorder, to how the grumpiness of North Sea oil workers had led to a cure being found for snoring.

Segments from MythBusters, another Beyond Television production, also aired as part of the program, which was criticised by Australian viewers because Beyond Productions had also sold Mythbusters to SBS. Both shows aired at almost at the same time, with the Beyond Tomorrow version redubbing the American narrator with host Matt Shirvington in Beyond 2000 by calling them "Beyond Tomorrow's Mythbusters", leaving some viewers feeling the company was insulting their intelligence by doing this double dip into the Australian market. The series had also been criticised by some fans of the earlier Beyond 2000 for featuring "futuristic" technologies that were obsolete or have been in common use for several years at the time. The theme music was also criticised for not being on par with Beyond 2000's, with some calling it lazy, generic and bland.

Beyond Tomorrow also aired in the US on The Science Channel and on Discovery Channel Canada. Production of the show ended in 2006 after 50 episodes, however reruns still continue to air on The Science Channel.

=== Presenters ===
- Matt Shirvington
- Graham Phillips
- Hayden Turner
- Anna Choy
- Dr Caroline West
- Sara Groen
- Grant Denyer
- Kim Watkins (February 2006 – July 2006)

== International ==
- In the United States, episodes of the series aired on the Fox network, under the Beyond Tomorrow name, from 1988 until 1990. The show was produced by Beyond International Group. From 1992 until its cancellation, the Discovery Channel aired Beyond 2000 with all of the episodes and segment introductions (along with new material) hosted by KRON-TV news anchor Henry Tenenbaum.
- In Sweden, a version called Bortom 2000 was hosted by nature photographer Bo Landin on TV4 in the early 1990s. (The series was short lived, however.)
- In Finland, a version called 2000 Nyt! was presented in 1994 on the MTV3 channel.
- In Italy, Beyond 2000 aired from 1988 to the early '90s on syndication network Odeon TV.
- In Malaysia, Beyond 2000 previously aired in the late 1980s through the early 1990s on RTM 1 (Later RTM TV1). Beyond Tomorrow would not be aired on the channel, but was eventually aired on the Discovery Channel (Southeast Asia) in the mid-2000s.
- In Indonesia, Beyond 2000 was aired on RCTI every Saturday morning in the early 1990s.
- In South Africa, Beyond 2000 was screened on SABC, M-Net and Bop TV.
- In Ireland, Beyond 2000 aired on RTÉ being shown on both networks One and Two.
- In Saudi Arabia, Beyond 2000 was shown on the English speaking television network Saudi 2.
- In New Zealand, Beyond 2000 was aired on TVNZ.
- In Jordan, Beyond 2000 was broadcast on the English, Arabic and French language television channel Channel 2 in English.
- In Kuwait, Beyond 2000 has been shown on KTV2, the country's governmental television channel dedicated for the English-speaking public.
- In Namibia, Beyond 2000 began airing on SWABC (when the country was originally known as South West Africa at the time) in 1989 and then on NBC in March 1990 (several days after the country had changed its name to Namibia).
- In Thailand, Beyond 2000 was aired on Channel 7 in 1990.
- In Poland, several episodes of Beyond 2000 were aired in the late 1980's. It was a part of collaboration between team of Beyond 2000 and creators of popular Polish science and technology TV series SONDA which started back in 1987. It was a first time when Australian show made this type of cooperation with TV show from the Eastern Block country.

== Board game ==
Beyond 2000: The Game was released in 1986 by Crown and Andrews. In the game, players have to proceed through three stages, collect cards of famous scientists and inventors and match them with their inventions, and take control of vital technology sectors. A copy of the game is held in the collection of the Powerhouse Museum.
