= For Love or Money (Australian TV program) =

- Presented by: Clive Hale
- Starring: Peter Cook; Anne Schofield; Lynelle Johnson; Anna Clark; Peter Cove
- Country of origin: Australia
- Original language: English
- No. of seasons: 3

Production
- Production location: Various historic locations
- Running time: 27 minutes

Original release
- Network: ABC Television
- Release: 1987 – 1989

For Love or Money is an Australian antiques television program that premiered on ABC Television in 1987, and aired through 1989. Clive Hale was the host and there were various panelists, including Peter Cook, who appraised antiques sent in by viewers. The episodes were filmed in various historic locations and featured a special guest showing a prized personal procession of their own.
