= Mike Willesee =

Australian television presenter (1942–2019)

Mike Willesee AO
- Michael Willesee - Journalist and TV presenter
- Born: Michael Robert Willesee; 29 June 1942; Perth, Western Australia, Australia
- Died: 1 March 2019 (aged 76); Sydney, New South Wales, Australia
- Occupations: Television presenter; interviewer; presenter
- Years active: 1967–2018
- Known for: This Day Tonight (1967-?); Four Corners (1969-1971); A Current Affair (1971-1974); This Is Your Life (1975-1978); Willesee at Seven (1974-?), 1984-); Sunday Night (2012-)
- Spouse(s): Joan Stanbury (divorced), Carol Willesee (divorced), Gordana Willesee (divorced)
- Children: 6
- Parents: Don Willesee (father); Gwendoline Clark (mother)
- Relatives: Terry Willesee (brother); Michael Willesee Jr. Janet Shaw (niece); Mark Whittaker (son-in-law); Allison Langdon (daughter-in-law)

Michael Robert Willesee, (29 June 1942 – 1 March 2019) was an Australian award-winning news and current affairs television journalist, interviewer and presenter. Willesee worked at the Australian Broadcasting Commission (ABC) , before moving to commercial networks Nine Network and Seven Network.

== Biography and career ==
=== Early life and family ===
Willesee was the son of politician, Western Australian ALP senator and foreign minister Don Willesee, who served in the Whitlam government, and his wife Gwendoline Clark Willesee, and nephew of Bill Willesee, also a politician with the Labour Party, a member of the Legislative Council of Western Australia and Tonkin government minister.

Willesee's brothers are Donald Robert "Don" Willesee Jr., and Terry Willesee, also a journalist and TV presenter and He was the father of Amy and journalist Michael Willesee Jr. he also has another daughter Kate Willesee who is a chiropractor. His son Michael Jr. is married to television host and reporter Allison Langdon and he was also the father-in-law of journalist and writer Mark Whittaker. His niece is cyclist and author Janet Shaw, Terry's biological daughter.

== Career ==
=== News and Current Affairs ===
Mike first came to prominence in 1967 as a reporter for then-new nightly current affairs program This Day Tonight (TDT), where his aggressive style quickly earned him a reputation as a fearless political interviewer.

Willesee figured prominently in the controversy that erupted over the decision in early 1967 by the Liberal government, led by Prime Minister Harold Holt, not to reappoint the ABC chair Dr. James Darling. This decision was rumoured to have been the result of the government's anger over critical coverage of its policies on the ABC.

Willesee's own critical comments about the decision on TDT on 2 April further angered Holt, who questioned the ABC's impartiality and implied that Willesee (whose father Don Willesee was a Labor Senator) was politically biased. Holt's remarks backfired, as they provoked strong protests from Willesee and the Australian Journalists' Association.

After TDT, Willesee hosted the current affairs program Four Corners from 1969 to 1971.

He then moved to the Nine Network, where he hosted A Current Affair when it debuted in 1971. While at A Current Affair, Willesee noticed the talent of a young Australian comedian, Paul Hogan, who had appeared on the amateur talent program New Faces in 1971, and he invited Hogan to make regular 5-minute appearances on the show. Hogan would perform skits and make humorous comments on some issue of the day. During this period, Hogan befriended A Current Affair producer John Cornell, who became Hogan's collaborator, long-term manager, business partner, and close friend.

Willesee later left Nine for a role as news and current affairs director at 0–10 Network (now known as Network 10), where he also presented a weekly interview program.

=== This is Your Life ===
He joined the Seven Network in 1975 and hosted the first Australian version of This Is Your Life.

=== Willesee ===
From 1973, Willessee partnered with former Sydney crime reporter and Canberra government Press Secretary and political advisor, Phil Davis, as his Executive Producer, from which partnership he presented a nightly current affairs program called Willesee at Seven which claimed a victory over A Current Affair in the same timeslot and led to that program being axed in 1978. "Willesee at Seven" became the leading current affairs program in Australia and won several Logie Awards, resulting also in Willessee winning the Gold Logie. Willesee at Seven later became Willesee '81 and Willesee '82 before it ended in 1982. Willesee and Davis also produced documentaries for the Seven network before Willesee left Seven for the Nine network and Davis became head of News and Current Affairs at Seven after creating a new current affairs program, TWT, with Mike's brother, Terry, as anchor.

He was known for a long-running friendship with a disabled boy named Quentin Kenihan, who had osteogenesis imperfecta. He was also known for sparring with the Orange People, who recruited in Australia during the 1980s. In 1987 the Committee of Skeptical Inquiry (CSICOP) presented Willesee with the Responsibility in Journalism award.

He returned to Nine in 1984 to revisit the nightly current affairs genre with Willesee as well as producing specials for the network, winning a Logie for Most Popular Documentary in 1986. One of the most significant interviews conducted by Willesee was the famous Birthday Cake Interview in 1993, with then leader of the Liberal Party, John Hewson. With the 1993 Federal Election to take place in only ten days, Willesee asked Hewson numerous questions about the proposed Goods and Services Tax (GST) that the Coalition wished to introduce. Hewson struggled to answer the simple question of whether a birthday cake would cost more or less under his government as a result of the GST. Willesee's unrelenting questioning along with Hewson's indecisive answers and his frequent stuttering made it appear that Hewson had little understanding of one of his own major policies. Hewson would go on to lose the election against Paul Keating and the Coalition would remain out of government for three more years, Many political analysts believed that the interview cost Hewson's chance of winning what his supporters dubbed the 'unloseable election'. However, others counter that opinion polls held up until election day still predicted a Coalition victory.

In 1993, Willesee received public outrage for his controversial action of interviewing, via phone, two young children, a brother 11 and his sister 9 who were being held hostage, during the 1993 Cangai siege. Many held the opinion that his actions were reckless and endangered the children's lives. This event was subsequently parodied by ABC TV's Frontline where main character Mike Moore interviewed a gunman and his hostage daughter. In the final scene of this episode, Mike interviews, live on air, another gunman in another siege who, much to Mike's horror, subsequently shoots each of his hostages, the sounds of which are played live across Australia.

Willesee is remembered by many Australians for the night when, filling in for Jana Wendt on A Current Affair, he fronted the show while appearing to be under the influence of alcohol. He claimed he was on medication, tired and emotional.

In his fifties, Willesee rediscovered the Roman Catholic faith of his upbringing. He has reported on religious topics, and in 1998, he made a report entitled Signs From God on the appearance of stigmata displayed by a woman, Catalina (Katya) Rivas, in Bolivia. This documentary was watched by an audience of 28 million in the United States. In 1999, Willesee won the Bent Spoon Award from the Australian Skeptics for Signs From God. The rationale for Willesee receiving the award was that the show was "seeking to capitalise on the irrational millennial fears of many people".

In 2002, Willesee became the 19th inductee into the TV Week Logies Hall of Fame.

On 21 August 2006, Willesee appeared on Andrew Denton's TV show Enough Rope and spoke about his dedication to discovering what science can ascertain about the Shroud of Turin; specifically, whether it contains the blood of Jesus Christ.

In 2012, Willesee joined the Seven Network's Sunday Night to do high-profile interviews. His first encounter was with Prime Minister Julia Gillard. In early 2013 he interviewed billionaire casino owner James Packer.

== Personal life ==
In 2017, Michael Willesee spoke about his battle with throat cancer on the TV program Australian Story. He also revealed how he had returned to his Catholic faith after years away from the Church. On 1 March 2019, Willesee died of throat cancer in Sydney, Australia at the age of 76.

Mike Willesee married and divorced three times. His first marriage was to Joan Stanbury, who as a 21-year-old West Australian school teacher became Miss Australia in 1959 began in 1965 was separated in 1972 and divorced 1975. In 1972 he met the Scottish model Carol, nee Brent (1947-2006) who had migrated to Australia two years earlier. They married in 1976. In the mid 1980s she started a career as actress. Her 1989 performance in Alan Ayckbourn's Just between ourselves by the Ensemble Theatre found broad acclaim. The marriage ended by 1989. In 1999 tv make-up artist Gordana Poljak became Mike Willesee's third wife. They separated after 11 years and subsequently divorced. He had six children: journalist Michael Jr., who in 2008 married Allison Langdon, host of A Current Affair in the mid 2020s, and Katie from his first marriage, daughters Amy, who married journalist Mark Whittaker, Lucy and Jo with Carol, and son Rok with his last wife.
