= Don Willesee =

Australian politician (1916–2003)

The Honourable Don Willesee
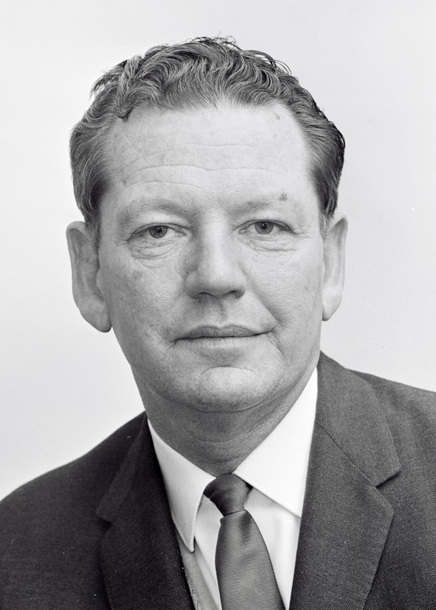

Minister for Foreign Affairs
- In office 6 November 1973 – 11 November 1975
- Prime Minister: Gough Whitlam
- Preceded by: Gough Whitlam
- Succeeded by: Andrew Peacock

Vice-President of the Executive Council Special Minister of State
- In office 19 December 1972 – 30 November 1973
- Prime Minister: Gough Whitlam
- Preceded by: Alan Hulme
- Succeeded by: Frank Stewart; Lionel Bowen

Leader of the Opposition in the Senate
- In office 17 August 1966 – 8 February 1967
- Preceded by: Nick McKenna
- Succeeded by: Lionel Murphy

Senator for Western Australia
- In office 22 February 1950 – 11 November 1975
- Preceded by: Robert Clothier
- Succeeded by: Ruth Coleman

Personal details
- Born: 14 April 1916 Derby, Western Australia
- Died: 9 September 2003 (aged 87) Joondalup, Western Australia
- Party: Labor
- Spouse: Gwendoline Clarke (m. 1940)
- Relations: Bill Willesee (brother); Janet Shaw (granddaughter)
- Children: 6 incl. Mike and Terry
- Occupation: Postal clerk

Donald Robert Willesee (14 April 1916 – 9 September 2003) was an Australian politician. He was a member of the Australian Labor Party (ALP) and served as a Senator for Western Australia from 1950 to 1975. He held ministerial office in the Whitlam government as Special Minister of State (1972–1973) and Minister for Foreign Affairs (1973–1975). He also served as Leader of the Opposition in the Senate from 1966 to 1967.

== Early life ==
Willesee was born in Derby, Western Australia, to Ethel May (née Flinders) and William Robert Willesee, who were originally from South Australia. His older brother, Bill Willesee, was a state parliamentarian. Willesee was educated at state and convent schools at Carnarvon in the same state. He left school at 14 (his father and brother had lost their jobs during the Great Depression), to work as a postal clerk in Carnarvon, and immediately joined the Australian Union of Postal Clerks and Telegraphists. He eventually became state secretary of this organisation. He later worked as a telegraphist in Perth. In 1940 he married Gwendoline Clarke.

== Political career ==
Willesee joined the Australian Labor Party when he was 21 and was elected as a senator for Western Australia in 1950 at the age of 33, taking office as the Senate's youngest member. He worked with Whitlam to reform the Labor Party prior to the 1972 election. According to Kim Beazley he was a "... key assistant to Gough Whitlam as he set about the task of restructuring the Labor Party ... and made an intelligent, brilliant rabble fit for government."

Following the 1972 election, Willesee was appointed as Special Minister of State, Vice-President of the Executive Council, Minister assisting the Prime Minister and Minister assisting the Minister for Foreign Affairs in the second Whitlam Ministry (which followed the "two-man Ministry" from 5 to 19 December 1972). As Special Minister of State he endorsed the establishment of a computerised library information system to connect national, state and university libraries, which has continued to evolve.

Whitlam relinquished the position of Minister for Foreign Affairs to him on 6 November 1973 and in this period he had the major responsibility of implementing the Whitlam government's, ambitious new foreign policy directions, which included improving relations with Asia. For Willesee, this meant Australia taking a more pragmatic approach to international affairs; in a speech to the Australian Institute of International Affairs in June 1974 he declared: "the first duty of Government is to recognise and comprehend the world as it actually is, not as we might conceive or wish it to be. That is a cardinal principle of the way this Government has approached foreign policy. Australia, if it is to serve national interests in an effective manner, can no longer afford to impose on international events interpretations at variance with the facts."

This approach translated into action in various ways, on 26 February 1973, Willesee led the push to recognise the Democratic Republic of Vietnam, and directed the establishment of the Australian Embassy in Hanoi in July 1973. A new Embassy in East Berlin was also established in East Germany in March 1975 following recognition of the GDR in 1973, as well as a new Embassy in Pyongyang, North Korea on 30 April 1975.

Willesee was opposed to Indonesia's invasion of East Timor and is quoted as having said in 1975:

There is no doubt that Gough felt East Timor should be incorporated within Indonesia. I just believed we should have left the decision to the East Timorese, without any suggestions or trying to lead them to Indonesia. That was the difference between myself and Gough.

— Don Willesee

He did not stand for re-election at the 1975 double dissolution election.

During the 1970s Willesee worked for the United States of America in what a historian has called "a discreet relationship".

== Death ==
Willesee died in Joondalup Hospital, Joondalup, two weeks after a heart attack, survived by his wife Gwen, and their six children, Colleen, Mike, Terry, Geraldine, Don junior and Peter. Through Terry, he was the biological paternal grandfather of author and cyclist Janet Shaw. He was the last surviving member of the 1950-1955 Senate.

At his death, the Prime Minister said:

In my acquaintance with him—and I know I speak for those of my party and the National Party who dealt with him when he was a member of parliament—he was a friendly, decent, courteous and forthright man, whom we respected across the political divide.

— John Howard

According to the leader of the opposition at the time,

Don was a great human being, a man of immense integrity. He was much loved by his staff, a passionate Labor man who never forgot the effects of the Great Depression. He never walked past a homeless kid without digging deep into his pockets.

— Simon Crean

== Notes ==
Political offices
Preceded by Nick McKenna	Leader of the Opposition in the Senate; 1966–1967	Succeeded by Lionel Murphy
New title	Special Minister of State; 1972–1973	Succeeded by Lionel Bowen
Preceded by Alan Hulme	Vice-President of the Executive Council; 1972–1973	Succeeded by Frank Stewart
Preceded by Gough Whitlam	Minister for Foreign Affairs; 1973–1975	Succeeded by Andrew Peacock
Party political offices
Preceded by Nick McKenna	Leader of the Australian Labor Party in the Senate; 1966–1967	Succeeded by Lionel Murphy
Honorary titles
Preceded by Sir Keith Wilson	Earliest serving living Senator; 1987–2003	Succeeded by Nancy Buttfield
