= Peter Cook (antiques) =

Australian Army officer

- Born: 21 July 1924; Melbourne, Australia
- Died: 22 December 2003 (aged 79); Sydney, Australia
- Education: Newington College; Royal Military College, Duntroon
- Occupations: Army officer Antique dealer
- Spouse: Joan (née Beattie)
- Children: 2 sons, 1 daughter
- Parent(s): George Sydney Cook; Elsie Sheppard

Lieutenant Colonel Peter Joseph Cook (21 July 1924 – 22 December 2003) was an Australian Army officer, antique dealer and writer, and ABC Television panelist on For Love or Money.

== Family ==
Cook was born in Melbourne, the only child of Major George Sydney "Syd" Cook and Elsie Cook (née Sheppard) His second given name, Joseph, was in honour of his paternal grandfather, Sir Joseph Cook GCMG, the sixth Prime Minister of Australia. Elsie, a Red Cross nurse, and Syd, an architect, had served abroad during World War I and were both mentioned in dispatches. In the six-part Australian television drama series ANZAC Girls, on ABC1, Laura Brent plays Elsie Cook and Todd Lasance plays Syd Cook.

== Education ==
Syd Cook was appointed Director of the Department of Housing & Construction in Western Australia and Peter was educated at Wesley College, Perth, from 1936 until 1939. After his father's transfer to Sydney, Cook attended Newington College from 1940 until 1942. He was the second of four generations of his family to be educated at Newington – his uncles, including Justice Cecil Cook, were amongst the first generation and his grandsons were amongst the fourth. His grandmother, Mary Turner Cook DBE, was the foundation president of the Newington College Parents' and Friends' Association.

== Military service ==
After graduating from the Royal Military College, Duntroon, in 1944, Cook served in the Australian Army in World War II and the Korean War. At the time of his retirement in 1960 he had achieved the rank of lieutenant colonel.

== Antiques ==
On retirement from the regular army Cook became proprietor of Grafton Galleries, in Double Bay, Sydney, an antique business founded by his mother in 1945. Cook was the consultant editor of The Antique Buyer's Handbook for Australia from 1979 until 1993. He wrote a column, Collector's Corner, for the Australian Women's Weekly from 1975 until 1982. In 1987, Cook became a panelist on the television series For Love or Money. The show ran for three years and the Sydney Morning Herald described him as "the viewers favourite antiques expert" whilst the Canberra Times saw him as being the show's "most cerebral panellist". Hartley Cook is now the third generation of the Cook family to be the proprietor of Grafton Galleries and the business is now located on Boundary Street, Rushcutters Bay.
