= Today Tonight =

Australian television program

- Title card
- Genre: Current affairs
- Country of origin: Australia
- Original language: English
- No. of seasons: 25

Production
- Running time: 23 minutes

Original release
- Network: Seven Network
- Release: 30 January 1995 – 29 November 2019

Related
- Real Life (1992–1994)

History of Today Tonight editions

Today Tonight is an Australian current affairs television program produced by the Seven Network. It aired from January 1995 to November 2019 in Adelaide and Perth. Editions in Brisbane, Sydney and Melbourne were previously produced before being cancelled in February 2014.

== History ==
Following the cancellation of Real Life, presented by Stan Grant late in 1994, Today Tonight was launched in January 1995 to replace it, with separate editions for each main metropolitan market (Sydney, Melbourne, Brisbane, Adelaide and Perth).

Over summer, it was usual for Today Tonight to present a single edition broadcast across the entire east coast of Australia (that is, combining Sydney, Melbourne, and Brisbane).

Today Tonight nationally was the last program to win the Logie for Most Popular Public Affairs Program before that award was discontinued.

=== South Australia ===
The South Australian edition was hosted by Rosanna Mangiarelli.

Since the program's inception in South Australia in 1995 until 2007, Leigh McClusky fronted the South Australian edition of the program, only taking leave over summer and to give birth to her son in 2002 (John Riddell filled in) and to have a daughter in 2006 (Rosanna Mangiarelli filled in). When the program first started, it rated 100,000 behind its competitor, A Current Affair, although ratings steadily increased. In 2001, Today Tonight began outrating A Current Affair in what became a 4-year winning streak.

McClusky announced on 6 February 2007, she would leave the programme to have twins, and would not return. She presented her last show on 17 August 2007. Rosanna Mangiarelli began as presenter on 20 August 2007 after several years as substitute presenter.

On 1 October 2007, the South Australian edition of the program began airing in regional South Australia, after WIN Television changed their affiliation in the state from the Nine Network to the Seven Network.

Mangiarelli was away on maternity leave from January 2009 till March 2009, and Paul Makin presented during this period.

The South Australian edition didn't air on the Seven Network's affiliated station, Southern Cross Television, in the Spencer Gulf or Broken Hill, which used its 6:30pm timeslot for its now defunct local bulletin.

The Adelaide edition of Today Tonight achieved the longest winning streak for a television program since the introduction of the current OzTAM ratings system in 2001, reaching 700 consecutive weeks of winning its timeslot between March 2001 and September 2018.

On 26 November 2019, it was announced that Seven had axed the remaining Adelaide and Perth editions of the show, to be replaced with a one-hour bulletin of Seven News. The final Adelaide bulletin was aired on 28 November 2019.

=== Western Australia ===
The Western Australian edition was hosted by Monika Kos.

The show was originally presented by Yvette Mooney. In 1997, Mooney resigned and was replaced by Kos, who continued right up until the show's cancellation in November 2019.

The fill-ins for the Western Australian edition were Tina Altieri or Andrea Burns.

The final Perth bulletin aired on 29 November 2019.

=== New South Wales & Victoria ===
The New South Wales edition was originally hosted by a myriad of hosts from 1995 until 2001. Neil Mercer initially hosted the Sydney edition, later succeeded by Helen Wellings (1996).

Jill Singer originally hosted the Victorian edition, she remained as host until January 1997 when she was replaced by Naomi Robson and Peter Luck (1997–1998) following health issues. Stan Grant, ex host of Today Tonight predecessor Real Life, returned in 1999 following the departure of Luck. Grant was sacked in 2000 after it was exposed he was having an affair with another then Seven Network personality, Tracey Holmes, and was subsequently replaced by Melissa Doyle. When Doyle went on maternity leave in 2001, the Victorian edition hosted by Robson began to be broadcast into Sydney. This was intended to last only 12 weeks, but the Victorian version rated higher in Sydney than the local version. This led to Seven Network executives axing the New South Wales edition in favour of an east coast edition. Doyle returned at the end of 2002 to host the summer edition.

Robson continued to host Today Tonight until she resigned in late 2006, presenting her last show on 1 December that year. Anna Coren was appointed Robson's permanent replacement after six weeks of filling in as the show's summer host. With Coren taking the chair, production of Today Tonight shifted from Seven's Melbourne studios to the Martin Place studio in Sydney.

On 28 September 2008, Coren resigned to pursue a career at CNN in Hong Kong. It was originally planned that Coren would continue as host until December 2008, but she was sacked by Seven and hosted her last show on 10 October 2008, to be replaced by new host Matt White. White hosted the show until November 2012.

On 11 February 2013, Helen Kapalos commenced as host, and production was moved back to Melbourne where Kapalos was based. In January 2014, Helen Kapalos resigned as host to join Sunday Night as a senior correspondent. Kylie Gillies and Nick Etchells were the fill-in hosts for the show, until it was announced on 3 February 2014 that the east coast edition of Today Tonight would be axed in favour of a one-hour Seven News bulletin. On 21 February 2014, the east coast edition was axed.

=== Queensland ===
The Queensland edition, while unrelated to an earlier series of the same name which aired on QTQ from 1979 to 1985, was fronted by three different presenters in the course of its 7–8-year run, with Lexy Hamilton-Smith and Michelle Reiken presenting after Carolyn Tucker. On 9 December 2002, Michelle Reiken went on maternity leave over the summer non-ratings period. During this time, the Melbourne/Sydney edition was broadcast into Brisbane. When the 2003 ratings period commenced, Seven Brisbane continued to air the Melbourne/Sydney edition instead of returning to a local version. Although the Seven Network announced a local edition would return when Reiken returned from maternity leave, this never happened. In May 2003, Seven Brisbane officially axed its local version.

In 2013, the Queensland edition was relaunched, with Sharyn Ghidella as host. On 3 February 2014, however, the Seven Network announced the Queensland edition would be axed again, in favour of a one-hour Seven News bulletin.

== Criticism ==
Today Tonight was notorious for its sensationalist reporting, and was an example of tabloid television where stories rotated around controversial issues such as diet fads, miracle cures, demonization of welfare recipients, shonky builders, negligent doctors, poorly run businesses and corrupt government officials. The program was found to be in breach of the Australian Communications and Media Authority's (ACMA) policies multiple times, specifically with regard to invasions of privacy and not presenting factual material accurately.

=== Christopher Skase controversy ===
In November 1996, Media Watch revealed that Today Tonight had fabricated a report about disgraced Australian businessman and former Seven Network owner Christopher Skase. Today Tonight sent producer Chris Adams and reporter David Richardson, along with a camera crew, to pursue Skase, who was claiming his health prevented him from being tried. Richardson alleged that because the crew's videotapes showed Skase was in good health, he used his connections to the Mallorcan authorities in order to establish police roadblocks to seize the tapes. The only support for this claim was a video of Richardson driving past police, exclaiming, "Roadblocks! Let's get out of here!" Media Watch proved, through examination the Today Tonight footage, that it was in fact shot in Barcelona, not Mallorca. The "police" Richardson was passing were in fact the Guàrdia Urbana de Barcelona setting up roadblocks to control traffic flow in the city centre.

=== Dole Army hoax ===
On 4 February 2002, both Today Tonight and A Current Affair broadcast stories about a so-called "Dole Army" operating from Melbourne's subterranean stormwater drains, and recruiting for an organised effort to defraud the Australian government of unemployment benefits. The next day, an anarchist group claimed they had pretended to be the Dole Army as a hoax, and due to lack of research and a desire to vilify the unemployed, both Today Tonight and ACA fell for the elaborate prank.

=== Contempt of court allegations ===
In 2004, Today Tonight picked up on a story published in Melbourne's Sunday Herald Sun about a boy allegedly "divorcing" his mother. The story was subsequently discussed on Seven's breakfast television program Sunrise. The following year, journalists, editors and producers from all three media outlets were taken to the Sydney Magistrates Court for breaching the Children and Young Persons Act 1989 by naming the child in question. Naomi Robson was found not guilty of contempt of court, as the magistrate found she did not have editorial control over the story, but producers of the show were fined.

=== The "Serial Single Mum" controversy ===
On 18 July 2005, Today Tonight screened a report by Richardson about "Australia's Serial Single Mum," claiming that a single mother named "Mary-Anne", a private citizen in suburban Sydney, "had five children to five different men and pocketed tens of thousands in welfare" from Centrelink. It was later revealed by Media Watch that Mary-Anne was working full-time and had the children to four fathers, not five. Media Watch described the exchange between Richardson and Mary-Anne as an "appalling attack", and "another offensive beat up from Dave 'Sluggo' Richardson".

=== The "Wa-Wa" controversy ===
On 13 September 2006, Robson and a Today Tonight crew were detained by Indonesian authorities in Papua for working as journalists despite entering the country on tourist visas. Seven claimed its team was sent to the region to do a story on Wa-Wa, a young boy who was apparently in danger of being ritually killed and eaten by his tribe, the Korowai. Seven also claimed their rivals at Nine, who had previously aired a story about Wa-Wa on 60 Minutes, sabotaged the story and the mission to "rescue" Wa-Wa by informing Indonesian authorities of their visa arrangements. Nine refuted Seven's claims and threatened legal action. Seven alleged a Nine reporter offered about $100,000 to a guide not to help Seven with their story. Peter Meakin, Seven's director of news and current affairs, said, "There is evidence to support the claims that, in particular, this man Cornelius was offered $100,000 not to rescue the boy."

=== Defamation of Mark McGaw ===
On 2 November 2006, the Supreme Court of New South Wales awarded A$385,000 to former Gladiator and rugby league star Mark McGaw for a defamatory story Today Tonight broadcast in June 2003. The Supreme Court jury found the story conveyed two defamatory imputations: that McGaw was "a man of dangerous domestic violence", and that he "bashed his lover so severely she was hospitalised with horrific injuries".

=== Chain stunt ===
On 20 February 2007, the east coast edition of Today Tonight led with a story about Shirley Frey, an 84-year-old resident of a nursing home in Willoughby who was fighting attempts to evict her. The story featured footage of her chained in her room. The reporter, Nicolas Boot, said she was "refusing to budge, chaining herself to her room". In response to the airing of that story, officials with the Department of Health and Ageing visited the nursing home. According to a spokesman for Minister for Ageing Santo Santoro, the resident told them the chains had been brought by the Today Tonight crew, and the process of chaining her up had been instigated by the program.

In response to this incident, presenter Anna Coren was forced to read an apology to viewers on the next night's broadcast, and announced Seven had launched an internal investigation. Earlier that day, Boot was suspended. On 23 February, Seven released a statement indicating Boot had left his employment with the network. However, no announcement was made as to any actions taken against off-camera staff over this incident, which Meakin described as "one of the more embarrassing" incidents he had had to deal with.

=== "Vietnamese Sting" controversy ===
On 8 May 2007, Today Tonight reported about an alleged Vietnamese-Australian welfare cheat named Dat Van Vu; though using the generalised title "Vietnamese Sting". This resulted in anger among the Australian Vietnamese community because of the association of ethnicity to criminality, and with the program's usage of the flag of Vietnam rather than the flag of South Vietnam which many Vietnamese Australians identify with.

=== Mercedes Corby ===
In 2007, Today Tonight ran a story on Mercedes Corby, sister of convicted drug trafficker Schapelle Corby. Mercedes' friend, Jodi Power, claimed Mercedes was a drug trafficker as well. Mercedes sued Seven for defamation, and in May 2008 a NSW Supreme Court jury decided in her favor, resulting in a settlement the next day of an undisclosed sum. Earlier, on 14 March 2007, Coren admitted in an interview with The Daily Telegraph that a private investigator hired by Seven lied about being an official to set up Mercedes.

=== Karl Stefanovic's alleged drinking controversy ===
On 7 May 2009, Today Tonight broadcast a segment on Today co-host Karl Stefanovic, alleging he was drunk on air during the post-Logies edition of Today. It reported the rumour Stefanovic was taken off air for more than two days following the incident. Nine said the claims were "desperate nonsense" and "wilfully false". Nine spokesman David Hurley said Stefanovic was tired, not drunk; that the reason he did not appear on Today was due to a prior engagement to appear on 60 Minutes; and that claims of Stefanovic being taken off air were a "pure invention of Channel Seven".

=== The Facebeef Group's Cyberbully Troll ===
On 11 March 2013, Today Tonight aired a longer than usual eight-minute exposé on supposed cyberbully Tristan Barker, labelling him "the world's nastiest man." The story featured "victim" Jasmine Frost, who accused Tristan of cyberbullying, and told reporter David Eccleston she had received "pictures of penises in the mail" from Tristan and his followers. Approximately four hours after the story aired, a video was posted on YouTube by 'Facebeef' member Lewis Spears (under the alias "Nebz Adlay"), revealing Facebeef had constructed the entire story in order to trick Today Tonight. Frost appeared and revealed herself to be a longstanding member of Facebeef and the pair taunted Today Tonight for not conducting thorough research. The following day, Today Tonight released a statement admitting they were incorrect and called Jasmine an "attention seeker". The stunt received mainstream news coverage.
