= HMS Otter (S15) =

Submarine of the Royal Navy

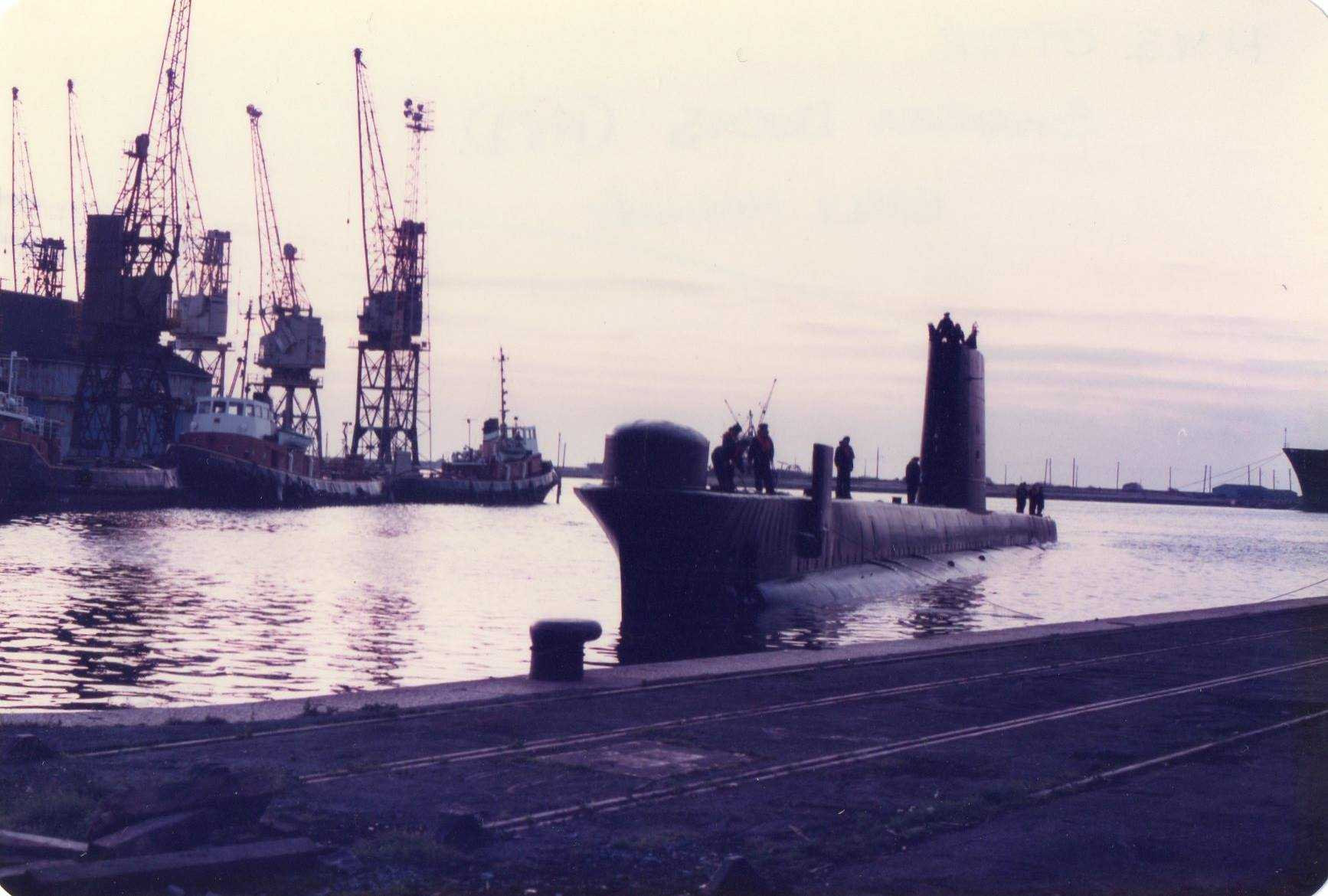
- HMS Otter in harbour

History

United Kingdom
- Name: HMS Otter
- Builder: Scotts Shipbuilding, Greenock
- Laid down: 14 January 1960
- Launched: 15 May 1961
- Commissioned: 20 August 1962
- Decommissioned: 31 July 1991
- Identification: Pennant number: S15
- Fate: Scrapped at Pounds yard of Portsmouth by European Metal Recycling in April 1992. Parts from the Otter were sold to Chile for use on their O boats.

General characteristics as designed
- Class & type: Oberon class
- Displacement: 1,610 tons standard; 2,030 tons full load surfaced; 2,410 tons full load submerged
- Length: 241 feet (73 m) between perpendiculars; 295.2 feet (90.0 m) length overall
- Beam: 26.5 feet (8.1 m)
- Draught: 18 feet (5.5 m)
- Propulsion: 2 × Admiralty Standard Range 16 VMS diesel generators; 2 × 3,000 shaft horsepower (2,200 kW) electric motors; 2 shafts
- Speed: 17 knots (31 km/h; 20 mph) submerged; 12 knots (22 km/h; 14 mph) surfaced
- Complement: 68
- Sensors & processing systems: Type 186 and Type 187 sonars; I-band surface search radar
- Armament: 8 × 21-inch (530 mm) torpedo tubes (6 forward, 2 aft); 24 torpedoes

HMS Otter (S15) was an Oberon-class submarine of the Royal Navy.

== Design and construction ==
The Oberon class was a direct follow on of the Porpoise-class, with the same dimensions and external design, but updates to equipment and internal fittings, and a higher grade of steel used for fabrication of the pressure hull.

As designed for British service, the Oberon-class submarines were 241 feet (73 m) in length between perpendiculars and 295.2 feet (90.0 m) in length overall, with a beam of 26.5 feet (8.1 m), and a draught of 18 feet (5.5 m). Displacement was 1,610 tons standard, 2,030 tons full load when surfaced, and 2,410 tons full load when submerged. Propulsion machinery consisted of 2 Admiralty Standard Range 16 VMS diesel generators, and two 3,000 shaft horsepower (2,200 kW) electric motors, each driving a 7-foot diameter (2.1 m) 3-bladed propeller at up to 400 rpm. Top speed was 17 knots (31 km/h; 20 mph) when submerged, and 12 knots (22 km/h; 14 mph) on the surface. Eight 21-inch (530 mm) diameter torpedo tubes were fitted (six facing forward, two aft), with a total payload of 24 torpedoes. The boats were fitted with Type 186 and Type 187 sonars, and an I-band surface search radar. The standard complement was 68: 6 officers, 62 sailors.

Otter was laid down by Scotts Shipbuilding and Engineering Company on 14 January 1960, and launched on 15 May 1961. The boat was commissioned into the Royal Navy on 20 August 1962. The only Oberon class submarine fitted with a mild steel casing needed when deployed as target for practice torpedo attacks.

== Operational history ==
She was assigned to the 1st Submarine Squadron in Gosport and served on the frontline of the Cold War patrolling and surveilling the North Atlantic.

== Decommissioning and fate ==
Otter was paid off on 31 July 1991.
