= Allison Langdon =

Australian journalist

- Born: 1983 or 1984 (age 42–43); Wollongong, New South Wales, Australia
- Education: Charles Sturt University
- Occupations: TV presenter; reporter; journalist
- Years active: 2000–present
- Employer: Nine Network
- Known for: A Current Affair – Host (2022–present); 60 Minutes – Presenter and reporter (2011-present)
- Notable work: National Nine News – producer (2001–present); Nightline – producer (2001–present); Today – presenter (News reporter 2017, co-anchor (2020–2022)); Weekend Today – presenter
- Spouse: Michael Willesee Jr. (m. 2008)

Allison Langdon (born 1983/1984) is an Australian television presenter, journalist, reporter and author. She is currently the host of A Current Affair and a presenter and reporter on localised version of current affairs program 60 Minutes.

Langdon was previously co-host of breakfast television program Today alongside Karl Stefanovic and Weekend Today.

== Early life and training ==
Langdon was born in Wollongong and moved to Wauchope at age seven. She was raised on a farm and attended Wauchope High School and Port Macquarie's MacKillop Senior College. During her time at school, she presented radio programs on Monday evenings on the local community radio station 2WAY FM, which is based in Wauchope. After leaving school, she studied journalism at Charles Sturt University.

== Career ==
Langdon joined the Nine Network after completing her journalism degree, which included an internship with CBS in New York City. She began her media career as a producer for Nightline in 2001.

In 2002, Langdon worked as a producer for the 6:00pm bulletin of National Nine News. Seeking more on-the-road experience, Langdon moved to Nine's Darwin newsroom and, in her first year in the Top End, won the David Marchbank Award for best new journalist. Alongside her round as political reporter for the Northern Territory, Langdon travelled to Mexico and East Timor covering stories for news and the Sunday program.

Langdon was one of the first Australian journalists on the ground following the Australian Embassy bombing in Jakarta in September 2004. She filed daily for all of Nine's bulletins.

In 2008, Langdon released her first book; The Child Who Never Was: Looking for Tegan Lane, which examined the murder of newborn infant Tegan Lane by her mother Keli Lane.

In February 2009, Langdon was criticised for her reporting in Marysville, Victoria, which had been devastated by the Black Saturday bushfires, and where 34 people had died. The town was sealed off as a crime scene, but Langdon and her camera crew helicoptered into the scene despite a police ban on entering the town.

In 2011, she became a reporter on the Nine Network's 60 Minutes program.

In December 2017, Langdon was appointed co-host of Weekend Today, replacing Deborah Knight. She continued to work as a reporter on 60 Minutes and a fill-in presenter on Nine News Sydney and Today.

In November 2019, the Nine Network announced that Langdon will host Today with Karl Stefanovic from January 2020.

In 2021, Langdon was announced as the host of the brand new Nine Network entertainment parenting program titled Parental Guidance. She returned to the show for a second season which premiered in 2023.

In November 2022, Nine Network announced that Langdon was appointed as the host of A Current Affair, replacing Tracy Grimshaw from 2023, with her role on Today taken over by Sarah Abo.

At the Logie Awards of 2024, Langdon won Best News or Public Affairs Presenter for her work on A Current Affair. This was her first individual Logie. In her acceptance speech, Langdon acknowledged her late father-in-law Mike Willesee, the first presenter of A Current Affair. In 2025, she was nominated for an award for a Gold Logie owing to her work on A Current Affair and Channel 9's broadcast of the 2024 Paris Olympic Games.

== Personal life ==
In June 2007, Langdon filed a stalking complaint against an admirer who sent her sexually explicit love letters. The admirer, who pleaded not guilty, was banned from coming within 500 metres of Langdon, or Channel Nine's studios in Sydney.

In August 2007, Langdon announced her engagement to journalist Michael Willesee, Jr., son of former A Current Affair host Mike Willesee. Langdon and Willesee, Jr. married in 2008. They have a son and a daughter.
