= Nationwide (Australian TV program) =

- Country of origin: Australia

Original release
- Network: ABC TV
- Release: 1979 – 1984

Nationwide is an Australian ABC TV current affairs program which ran from 1979 to 1984. It was a successor to This Day Tonight (1967–1978) and a predecessor to The National (1985), which after proving unsuccessful was replaced by The 7.30 Report in January 1986.
