= Bill Peach =

Australian television presenter and journalist (1935–2013)

Bill Peach AM
- Peach in 1971
- Born: William Norman Peach; 15 May 1935; Lockhart, New South Wales, Australia
- Died: 27 August 2013 (aged 78); St Leonards, Sydney, New South Wales, Australia
- Education: St Stanislaus College (Bathurst)
- Alma mater: St John's College, University of Sydney
- Occupations: Television presenter and journalist, travel operator
- Years active: 1958–1997
- Employer: Australian Broadcasting Corporation
- Television: This Day Tonight
- Spouse: Shirley Peach (1960–1997; her death)

William Norman Peach AM (15 May 1935 – 27 August 2013) known as Bill Peach, was an Australian television journalist who hosted the ABC current affairs program This Day Tonight from 1967 to 1975.

== Early life and education ==
Peach was born in 1935 in the Riverina town of Lockhart, New South Wales, his father was a stock agent, whilst his mum came from a family of graziers. He was educated at a Roman Catholic boarding school, St Stanislaus College in Bathurst, and then studied a master of arts degree at St John's College, University of Sydney, where he met his future wife, Shirley.

== Media career ==
Peach joined the Australian Broadcasting Commission (ABC) in 1958, as a specialist trainee in the talks department. In 1960, he joined the Sydney office of the British Broadcasting Corporation (BBC) where he worked in program sales. In 1962, he and his wife moved to the United Kingdom, where he worked for three years for the BBC overseas service, based in London and later New York City.

Returning to Australia in 1965, Peach joined Network Ten, where he co-produced and presented Australia's first current affairs program, Telescope, with Tanya Halesworth. In 1966, he returned to the ABC as a reporter for Four Corners. In 1967, he was appointed as the presenter of ABC's new evening current affairs series, This Day Tonight, which he hosted for eight years.

In 1975, Peach left This Day Tonight and was awarded a Logie in that year for Outstanding Contribution to Television in recognition of his eight years of service on the program. He then hosted a travel series called Peach's Australia and wrote two books in the Ginger Meggs series. Bill Peach also wrote The Explorers, published in 1984, dealing with the early European explorers of Australia during the colonial era and presented the eponymous TV show.

== Tourism career ==
After leaving the ABC, Peach started a travel and tourism company, Bill Peach Journeys.

In the 1991 Queen's Birthday Honours, Peach was made a Member of the Order of Australia (AM) for service to the media and to tourism.

== Death ==
Peach died of cancer at the Royal North Shore Hospital in Sydney in the early morning of 27 August 2013.
