= Janet Shaw (cyclist) =

Australian visually impaired cyclist

Personal information
- Full name: Janet Lucy Shaw
- Nationality: Australian
- Born: 7 October 1966 Perth, Western Australia
- Died: 3 December 2012 (aged 46)
Medal record
Cycling
Paralympic Games
Bronze medal – third place	2004 Athens	Women's Road Race / Time Trial Tandem B1–3
Bronze medal – third place	2004 Athens	Women's Individual Pursuit Tandem B1–3
IPC World Cycling Championships
Silver medal – second place	2002 Altenstadt	Women's Flying 200 m Time Trial B&VI
Bronze medal – third place	2002 Altenstadt	Women's 1000 m Time Trial B&VI
Bronze medal – third place	2002 Altenstadt	Women's 3000 m Pursuit B&VI
Bronze medal – third place	2002 Altenstadt	Women's 23 km Road Time Trial B&VI

Janet Lucy Shaw (7 October 1966 – 3 December 2012) was a visually-impaired Australian tandem cyclist and author. She became visually impaired due to congenital retinoblastoma (eye cancer) and lost her sight completely at the age of 33. She first represented Australia in cycling at the 2002 IPC World Cycling Championships. She broke several world records with her pilot, Kelly McCombie.; they won two bronze medals at the 2004 Athens Paralympics. In 2008, Shaw was re-diagnosed with cancer; she died of the disease in 2012. She wrote two memoirs and several books for children and young adults.

== Personal ==
Shaw was born on 7 October 1966 in Perth. She was born with retinoblastoma, a malignant eye cancer, and had one eye removed as a baby and had radiotherapy in the other. She was adopted as a baby along with three other children. Later in life she discovered that her biological father was media personality Terry Willesee. At the age of eight, she was transferred to a school for the blind. Shaw believed this had a negative impact on her life due to the strict nature of the school.

At the age of thirty three, Shaw lost her sight totally. In 2008, she was diagnosed with two cancers in four days, one of which was breast cancer. In 2010, she was told the chemotherapy treatment had failed and no other treatment was available. She then drew up a bucket list which included being a passenger on a motorbike, kayaking with dolphins in Monkey Mia and visiting a Byron Bay retreat with her dog Sabah. On 3 December 2012, she died after a long battle with cancer.

== Career ==
Shaw worked as a social worker for ten years until 2000. After losing her sight, she published several books including autobiographies and young adult books. Her two autobiographies Beyond the Red Door (2004) and Bit of a Superhero (2012) discussed her life with cancer and blindness. She was also a motivational speaker.

== Cycling ==
After losing all her sight in 2000, Shaw took up tandem cycling after attending a Come and Try Day with the Tandem Cycling Association. She commented that she "loved the feel of the speed as we were flying along and going round the corners on an angle, and sprinting for the finish line." With her tandem pilot Fiona Scarff, she first represented Australia at the 2002 IPC World Championships in Germany where she won a silver medal and three bronze medals. She won a gold medal in the road race at the 2003 European Cycling Championships, and broke a world record in the 200 m fly time trial at the 2003 national championships. At the Australian Championships before the 2004 Athens Paralympics, Shaw and her tandem partner Kelly McCombie broke two world records, including the 3 km pursuit, smashing 3 seconds off the world record time. Shaw and McCombie won two bronze medals at the games in the Women's Road Race / Time Trial Tandem B1–3 and the Women's Individual Pursuit Tandem B1–3. She was coached by Andrew Bludge and Darryl Benson.
