= Terry Willesee =

Australian presenter from 1969 to 2013

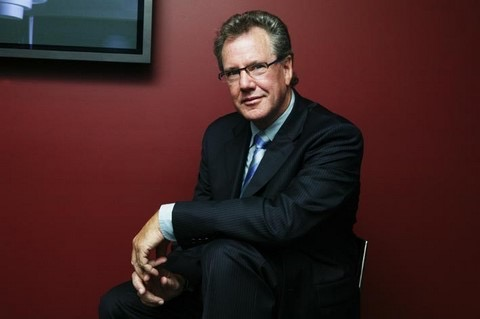
- Born: Terence Joseph Willesee; 27 April 1945 (age 81); Perth, Western Australia, Australia
- Occupations: Television presenter; radio announcer; journalist; reporter; documentary producer
- Years active: 1969−2013
- Notable credits: Terry Willesee's Perth Presenter; Terry Willesee Tonight Presenter; A Current Affair (US) Reporter; Nine Perth Newsreader
- Spouse: Melissa
- Children: 6
- Father: Don Willesee
- Relatives: Mike Willesee (brother); Michael Willesee Jr. (nephew)

Terence Joseph Willesee (born 27 April 1945) is an Australian retired journalist and television and radio presenter.

== Family ==
Willesee is the son of Gwendoline Clark Willesee and Don Willesee, a long-time member of the Australian Senate, and Whitlam government minister. He is the nephew of Bill Willesee, member of the Legislative Council of Western Australia and Tonkin government minister. He is the brother of Donald Robert "Don" Willesee Jr. and the late Mike Willesee, who was a journalist and television presenter.

== Career ==
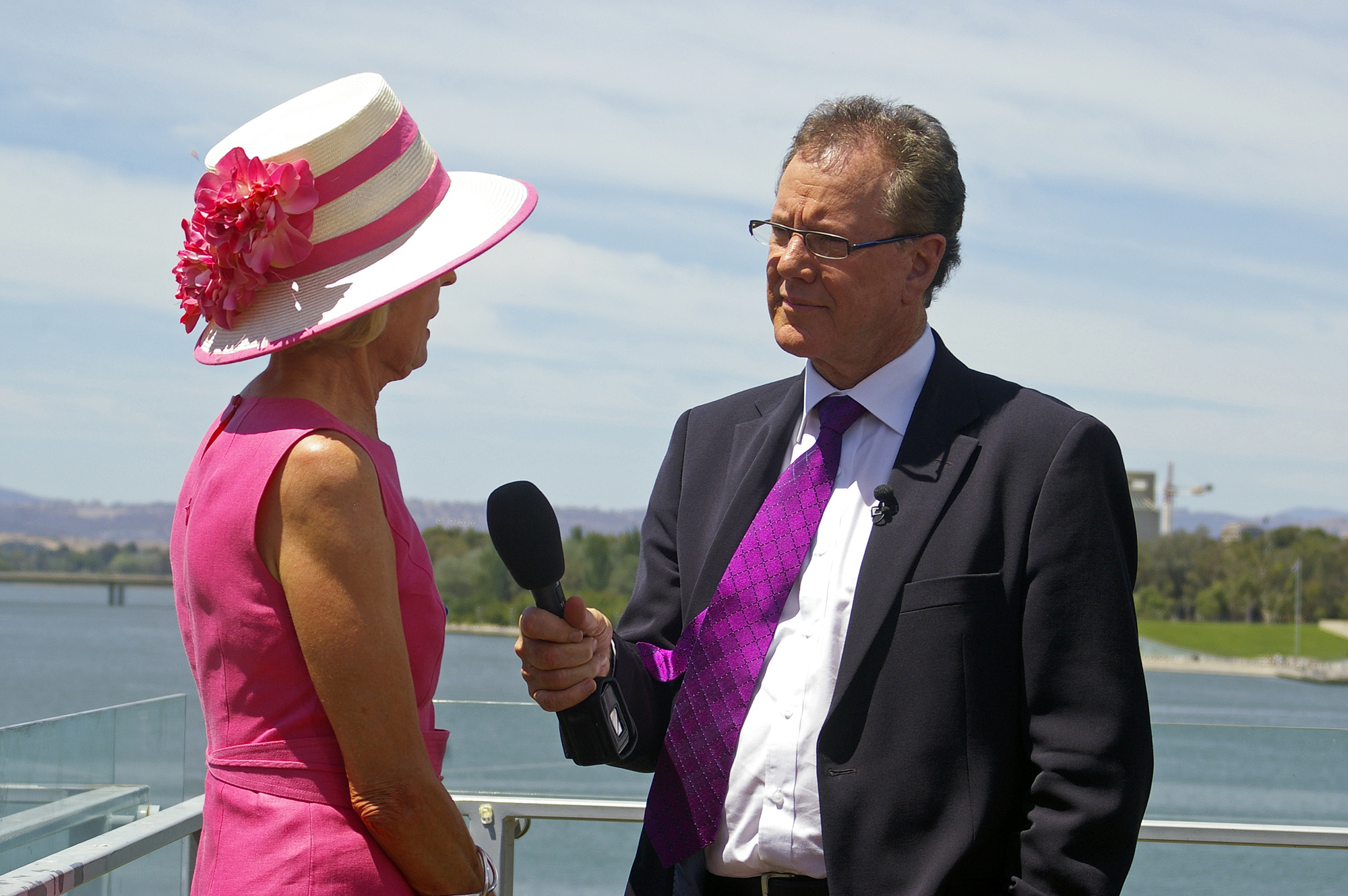
Willesee interviewing the Governor General of Australia, Quentin Bryce c. 2010

Willesee began his media career in Perth in 1969. He initially worked as a television news reporter before branching out into newsreading and producing documentaries. He produced and presented 14 prime time documentaries for STW TV station in Perth.

In 1981 Willesee was signed by the Seven Network to present a successful national current affairs program named Terry Willesee Tonight, based in Sydney. Willesee was then signed by the Nine Network. Willesee's role on the seven current affairs show went to Derryn Hinch.

Willesee hosted Live at Five on the Nine Network with Jo Pearson. He also hosted a variety of programs including Today and A Current Affair.

In 1992 Willesee moved to the United States where he anchored the nationally syndicated program, A Current Affair Extra. He also travelled the country as a reporter for A Current Affair (not related to Nine Network's programme of the same name). He was later promoted to anchor the Fox network's national programme, A Current Affair Extra.

After three years in the United States he moved back to Australia, reading news for Nine Network affiliate STW in Perth. While in Perth he occasionally hosted a talkback radio show for 6PR.

In 2001, Willesee presented a talkback radio show for Sydney radio station 2GB.

In 2002, Willesee returned to national television where he anchored Willesee Across Australia on Sky News Australia. He later presented First Edition in 2002 until June 2013 when he retired.

Willesee has also worked as a media trainer.

== Awards ==
- Logie Awards – Most Popular Male (Western Australia): 1978, 1979, 1980, 1981
