= This Day Tonight =

Television program

- Genre: Current affairs
- Presented by: Bill Peach
- Country of origin: Australia
- Original language: English

Production
- Producers: Allan Martin (EP), Sam Lipski, Ken Chown , Bill Prichard (Melbourne producer)

Original release
- Network: Australian Broadcasting Commission
- Release: 10 April 1967 – 1978

This Day Tonight is an Australian Broadcasting Commission (ABC) evening current affairs program that was broadcast from 1967 to 1978.

== Founding and synopsis ==
TDT premiered on 10 April 1967, being the first regular nightly current affairs program on Australian TV. It extended ABC's award-winning coverage of current affairs, which had begun in the early 1960s with its flagship weekly program Four Corners.

TDT was hosted for the first eight years by journalist Bill Peach.

The original on-air team consisted of executive producer Allan Martin, and producers Sam Lipski and Ken Chown in Sydney and Bill Pritchard in Melbourne.

The original reporters were 60 Minutes, Gerald Stone Frank Bennett, Peter Luck, and Gordon Bick in Sydney;

Gerald Lyons, Mike Crewdson and Brian King in Melbourne; and Eric Hunter in Canberra. Shortly after, Eric Hunter replaced Mike Crewdson in Melbourne and Mike Willesee became the program's first full-time political reporter. The fact that Melbourne reporters contributed to the programme with original material is often overlooked. Clive Hale hosted a South Australian version.

The impetus for this program sprang from Ken Watts, then ABC Director of Television, supported by Neil Hutchinson, ABC Controller of Programs. Watts had been in London and seen the BBC Tonight program, which ran from 1957 to 1965, and was one of the most popular programs in the UK at that time. He was determined to introduce a similar program into the ABC schedule. His first move was to second ABC Drama producer Storry Walton with a brief to identify reporters and on-air talent for a Sydney-based program with the working title of Tonight. Bill Peach was Walton's early nomination for compere, while Willesee, then Press Gallery reporter for the Perth Daily News was immediately hired after an impressive performance while being interviewed on the second night the program went to air.

Watts knew that to support such a daily program would require a minimum of two on-line producers alternating, and for these he nominated Sam Lipski and Ken Chown in Sydney, supported by Bill Pritchard in Melbourne. The appointment of additional staff, obtaining and scheduling film and studio resources and setting the style and shape of the program along the lines he envisaged were further requirements. There was also the complexity of setting up contributing units in each state, and the utilization of the developing microwave networks allowing those units to feed into the Sydney studios, which would originate the program.

Watts' next move was to find an executive producer with sufficient experience to take charge of the overall production. For this he looked to Allan Martin in New Zealand. Watts had met Martin and knew that he had worked as a producer/director for eight years in London for Associated-Rediffusion Television, and he was well aware of the BBC Tonight program. Martin had returned to New Zealand as TV Production Supervisor and later became Chief Producer of NZBC TV initiating programs of the Tonight format in the four main centres of the country entitled Town and Around. Watts offered Martin the position of executive producer.

Having been assured by Watts that on-air staff had been identified, Martin proposed a start of six weeks after his arrival in Australia in late February 1967, and although confronted by a lack of facilities was able to meet that deadline. In March he issued a five-page memo to all staff regarding what had been known as the Tonight project. It detailed operations in Sydney, Melbourne and Canberra, and the staff for the program, with dummy runs beginning on 27 March and transmission beginning on 10 April 1967. Martin, who was adamantly opposed to using the BBC title, made it clear in the memo that the program would be This Day Tonight. Having visited staff in all states it was clear to him that many of those involved in the production were unsure of the format. He attached an appendix to the operational memo which clearly outlined the nature, style and intention of the program.

Noted Australian journalist, author and filmmaker Tim Bowden also worked on the show as a producer. Other producers included Stuart Littlemore and John Crew.

== Journalists ==
It was a training ground for a generation of leading Australian TV journalists, including Gerald Stone (later the producer of the Australian 60 Minutes), Richard Carleton, Caroline Jones, Sonia Humphrey, Mike Willesee, George Negus, Mike Carlton, Allan Hogan and Peter Couchman.

TDT was renowned for its hard-hitting interviews, a craft brought to a high degree of perfection by Carlton and Negus; the program subjected Australian politicians to a novel degree of questioning and raised the hackles of politicians on both sides who were unused to being placed under such scrutiny. It also broke new ground with its famous "empty chair" tactic, naming politicians who had declined to appear on the show and showing the empty chair where an absent invitee was supposed to be seated.

However, TDT sometimes took a more irreverent approach to stories. One notable example of its occasionally controversial editorial approach was a musical comedy sketch that satirised the actions of then-NSW Premier Robert Askin, who was reported to have ordered his driver to "run over the bastards" when anti-war demonstrators threw themselves in the front the car in which he and visiting U.S. President Lyndon B. Johnson were travelling.

TDT also ran annual April Fool's Day stories, including the "Dial-O-Fish" (an electronic device attached to a fishing rod that could be set to catch any desired species), a story alleging that the Sydney Opera House was sinking into the harbour, and a bogus report about the supposed abolition of the 24-hour clock and the introduction of a metric (or decimal) time system. Each of these reports generated considerable feedback, with hundreds of viewers reportedly taken in by the hoaxes.

== Personnel ==
=== Production team ===
name	role
Allan Martin	Executive Producer (EP)
Sam Lipski	Sydney producer
Ken Chown	Sydney Producer
Bill Pritchard	Melbourne producer
Tim Bowden	Producer
Stuart Littlemore	Producer (general)
John Crew	Producer (general)

=== Presenters and correspondents ===
Name	Role
Bill Peach	Host (1967–1975)
Gerald Stone	Sydney correspondent
Frank Bennett	Sydney Correspondent
Peter Luck	Sydney correspondent
Gordon Rick	Sydney Correspondent
Gerard Lyons	Melbourne Corresondent
Mike Crewdson	Melbourne Correspondent
Brian King	Melbourne Correspondent
Eric Hunter	Canberra Correspondent, later Melbourne Correspondent replacing Mike Crewdson
Mike Willesee	Political Correspondent
Iain Finlay	South East Asia Correspondent

== Awards ==
TDT won many awards during its run, including Logie Awards for "Best New Program" in 1967, "Personal Effort Award – Special Commendation, Production Current Affairs Allan Martin", "Most Outstanding Coverage of Political Affairs" in 1971 and "Outstanding Contribution to TV Journalism" in 1977.

== Axing ==
The show was axed in 1978, and replaced with Nationwide. Current affairs in the 7.30 time slot was reintroduced with The 7.30 Report in 1986.
