= The Worst of Perth =

Blog in Perth, Western Australia

- Website type: Blog
- Owner: Andrew McDonald
- Creators: Andrew McDonald and various contributors
- Website: theworstofperth.com
- Commercial: No

The Worst of Perth is a WordPress blog that claims to be "...a showcase of the worst examples of architecture, design, culture and humanity in Perth, Western Australia". It publishes images of what it believes to be poor graphic design and art, "strange" buildings, bizarre gardens and churches and ill-conceived advertising.

Andrew McDonald, an employee of Curtin University and a part-time comedian, began the blog on 29 September 2007 with a post on the Peninsula Tavern in suburban Maylands. The building was judged to be Worst-worthy due to its bland render, poor-taste interior and palm trees.

The media soon showed interest in the blog. McDonald was interviewed by ABC Radio Perth Drive broadcaster Russell Woolf on 5 October 2007, and the blog experienced a jump in viewers when it was featured in The Sunday Times' STM on 28 October 2007. McDonald has also been interviewed by The Australian newspaper, national ABC youth radio network Triple J and ABC Radio Perth Mornings broadcaster Geoff Hutchison.

On 5 December 2007 McDonald claimed the blog "won its first public art scalp" when the Lord Mayor of Perth, Lisa Scaffidi, announced a 7.5-tonne (17,000 lb) limestone sculpture would be removed from outside the Perth railway station. The West Australian quoted Scaffidi as being "embarrassed" about the artwork (commonly known as the Youth of Perth sculpture) when she saw it on The Worst of Perth. In the previous month the blog, in a post titled "The First Level of Hell", had described the sculpture as a "monstrosity" that had "been plopped next to Perth’s main railway station for 20 years". The sculpture was removed on 19 March to Gomboc Gallery in Perth's Swan Valley.

In its Vanished Worst section the blog notes the subsequent destruction or closing of things it has focused on: these include a Chinese restaurant in Rivervale, the Norwood Hotel in Mount Lawley, suburban residential housing, a bingo centre, a lingerie factory and a dumping ground for wrecked cars.

The most-visited blog entries have been about The West Australian newspaper and Fairfax Media's WAtoday site. Former West editor Paul Murray is a frequent target of the blog; in February McDonald wrote "the actual motivator for starting this blog was to have a forum where I could label Paul Murray as the worst journo in Australia". Howard Sattler on the WAtoday site is also a frequent target. The most-visited thread on the site was an entry targeting prominent Perth lawyer and socialite Patti Chong. Chong personally responded to a criticism of her on the site, leading to a stream of correspondence that spilled over onto Chong's own blog on WAtoday. In August 2009 Chong resigned from her column on WAToday, blaming the relentless criticism and satire from internet bloggers.

The architecture of Uniting Church buildings has often appeared, as have poor examples of signwriting. The most commonly used tags on the blog are advertising, architecture and graphic design.

By the end of June 2008 there were more than 500 posts on The Worst of Perth and 17,400 comments. McDonald claims the blog received between 1000 and 3000 page views per day. In January 2008 the State Library of Western Australia sought McDonald's permission to archive the blog.

== See also ==
- The Australian Ugliness, 1960 book by architect Robin Boyd criticising the built Australian city and suburban landscape

== General references ==
- "Art crusader's monstrous job". The West Australian. Western Australian Newspapers. 3 December 2007.
- "'Turd of a sculpture' finds a champion in its buyer". The West Australian. Western Australian Newspapers. 6 December 2007.
- Laurie, Victoria (26 January 2008). "Getting over the growing pains". The Australian. News Limited. Archived from the original on 29 January 2008.
