= Kirka (disambiguation) =

Kirka was a Finnish musician.

Kirka may also refer to:

- Kirka, Republic of Dagestan, Rural locality in Russia
- Kırka, Seyitgazi, a neighbourhood in Turkey
- Kristo Kirka, Albanian politician and activist

== See also ==
- Kirke
