= Michael Charlton =

Michael Charlton may refer to:

- Michael Charlton (journalist) (1927–2025), television journalist
- Michael Charlton (academic), professor of physics

== See also ==
- Michael Charlton-Weedy (born 1950), British Army officer and civil servant
