= WAMN News =

Australian online news outlet

- Headquarters: Perth, Western Australia

Ownership
- Owner: West Australasian Media Network Pty Ltd

History
- Launched: January 2013
- Founder: Ivan Leung

Links
- Website: wamnnews.com.au

WAMN News (also known as WAMN News Online or simply WAMN) is an Australian online news outlet based in Perth, Western Australia. It livestreams press conferences on its Facebook page, and airs a weekly news bulletin.

== History ==
WAMN News was founded by journalist Ivan Leung in January 2013. Leung had previously founded DHK News in 2007, which covered news in Perth and Hong Kong.

Talk-back radio host Howard Sattler joined WAMN as a contributor in 2014 after being fired from radio station 6PR over a controversial interview with former Prime Minister Julia Gillard, in which he asked her whether her partner Tim Mathieson was gay.

WAMN won the Communications Award at the 2021 Western Australian Multicultural Awards, hosted by the Western Australian government's Office of Multicultural Interests.

Former ABC political reporter Peter Kennedy joined WAMN in early 2022.

As of December 2023, WAMN has over 55,000 followers on Facebook.
