= Verity James =

Australian funeral celebrant and former television and radio presenter

Verity James is an Australian funeral celebrant and a former ABC News Television and radio presenter.

Born in Sydney, James joined the Australian Broadcasting Corporation in Bega, New South Wales in 1984. Three years later she moved to Perth, where she has been a fixture on the Western Australia media scene ever since.

James worked as a full-time presenter on 720 ABC Perth until 2004, when after an extended period of long service leave, she decided to pursue other interests. Despite this, James continued to work intermittently on 720, filling in for regular presenters when they took leave. She was a regular on ABC TV's Can We Help?, and after Greg Pearce left radio to join Perth's National Nine News team in February 2008, James took over his early morning shift on 720 ABC Perth.

Verity has hosted the visits of the Dalai Lama, has recorded voice overs for a variety of events and commercials.

She now works as a funeral celebrant.

She was a candidate in the 2014 WA Senate by-election (together with Russell Woolf) on a "Save Our ABC" platform.
