= Australian Broadcasting Company =

Short-lived Australian commercial broadcasting company

Australian Broadcasting Company Pty Ltd
- Type: Proprietary company
- Founded: 1924
- Defunct: 30 June 1932
- Successor: Australian Broadcasting Commission
- Headquarters: Australia
- Owner: Farmer & Company; JC Williamson's; J. & N. Tait; Others

The Australian Broadcasting Company was a short-lived Australian commercial broadcasting company set up by Benjamin Fuller and Frank Albert. Founded in Melbourne in 1924 with a capital of £A 100,000 by a consortium of entertainment interests, notably Farmer & Company, J. C. Williamson's and J. & N. Tait to found and operate commercial radio broadcasting stations. Other major shareholders, perhaps later entrants, were Union Theatres Limited, B. & J. Fuller and J. Albert & Son. Directors were Stuart Doyle, Frank Albert and Sir Benjamin Fuller.

== The Sealed Set system ==
When the ABC was established in 1923, they adopted the 'sealed set' scheme as its source of income (see main article). 1,400 "sealed" receivers were sold, each fixed to receive one of four radio stations, before the system was abandoned, at least partly due to the ease with which it could be circumvented.

In 1924 a new system was introduced, where radio stations were divided into two categories, class A and class B, Each drawing funding in different ways.

== Licensing ==
In 1929 the company won the contract to supply radio programmes for broadcast on the "A-class" transmitters contracted to the Federal Government's National Broadcasting Service. The Royal Commission of 1927 had recommended full nationalisation in the style of the BBC, but the conservative government of the time chose this out-sourced approach instead. As each of the "A-class" licences expired during 1929 and 1930, the Commonwealth acquired and then maintained the station's transmitters and studios through the Postmaster-General's Department, while the programming was supplied by the Australian Broadcasting Company.

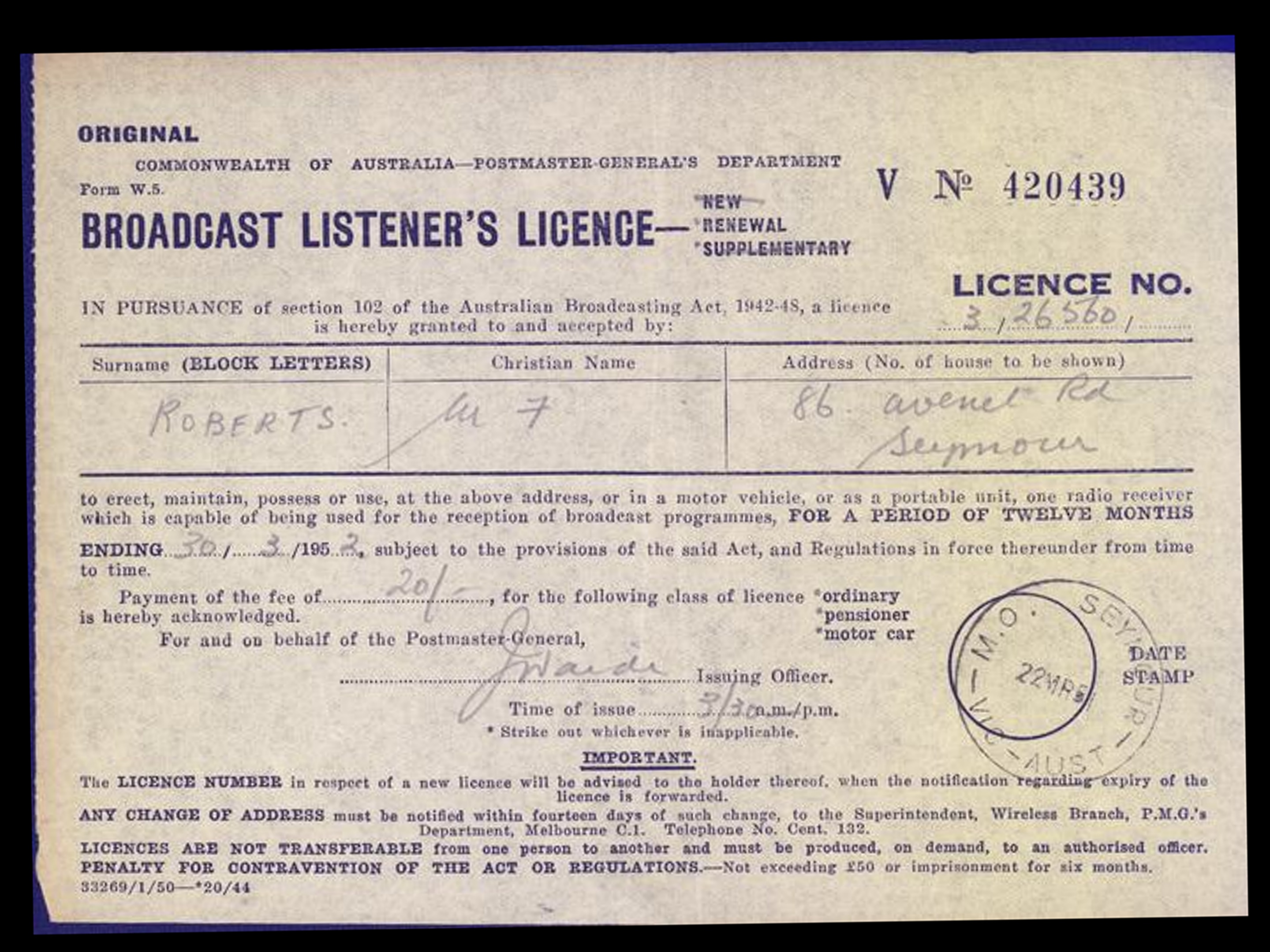
A Broadcasting Listener's Licence (March 30, 1952)

The ABC was originally funded through Licence fees which enabled radio programming. Listeners had to purchase a licence to be able to listen to the radio broadcast. From the 1920s to the 1970s, the earnings from these licences were used to finance the production of radio and television services.

=== A Class ===
Class A stations were funded by licence fees paid by listeners, as well as by limited advertising. In 1929, the Australian Government acquired all class A stations, which were henceforth operated by the Postmaster-General's Department. There were originally eight class A stations and most of the time, they aired talks, plays, and music, either broadcast live from the studio or another place connected to a station by telephone lines ("Outside Broadcasts"). The ABC would broadcast 'stunts' to influence the purchasing of licences, which financially benefited the A class stations and equipment shareholders would sell.

Of all the stations broadcast by the ABC, station 3LO was the most profitable. Located in Melbourne, Victoria, 3LO was both an A-class and B-class radio station. Licence revenues for the station were immediately returned to the broadcasters after the government removed deductions and fulfilled royalty payments to the AWA. In 1928, a senior colleague working for 3LO estimated that the station was making an annual profit of around AUD 90,000 - in comparison to its initial investment of AUD 11,500. According to Inglis, not all stations did nearly as well as 3LO. 6WF located in Perth wasn't doing well in 1926. The station was aimed at country people, but the farming families who would hear its programs didn't resonate with its content. This meant that not many in the WA audience held radio licences. In 1928, the Post Master General's office had to rescue 6WF by buying its land, renting its premises, and paying staff to keep working. 6WF was the first radio station managed by the Government, due to its lack of succession.

== Controversies ==
In 1927, a Royal Commission was instituted by the Federal Government due to audience dissatisfaction. The outcome was that the Australian Broadcasting Company would provide radio content under the new National Broadcasting Service (NBS).

=== B Class ===
Class B was purely funded by advertising, with its first radio station being 2BE Sydney. According to Jones in 1995, many B-class radio stations struggled. This included 2BE Sydney, which closed down in April 1929 due to its lack of consistent broadcasting. 2MK Bathurst followed by closing in December 1930. After inquiries as to why the station had been closed down, the Postmaster General's Department released a statement ensuring it was for the better, saying that "Exceptional care has been exercised by the Department in the expansion of broadcasting services to the Commonwealth so that listeners might enjoy the greatest possible selection of programs without undue risk of interference in reception between one station and another."

The Postmaster General's department also ensured that the Australian Broadcasting Company would provide exceptional service and maintain a high standard. According to Jones in 1995, the ABC should 'do all in its power to cultivate a public desire for transmission of educational items, musical items of merit and, generally, for all items and subjects which tend to elevate the mind.'

Following the Department's statement in response to the B class radio stations, the ABC was subject to rules, requiring the company to avoid tedious broadcasting repetition of an artist in a particular state. These rules were in the contract of the company with the department.

Following the disruption to 6WF, Chairman Harry Brown advocated for a C class station. It would be run by the Post Master General's office and made available for public audiences such as organisations or firms. Due to its lack of popularity, a C class station never came into existence.

1929 marked the five-year anniversary of A and B class stations. At the time, 301199 listener licences were held, and twenty radio stations were on air.

According to Jones, 40% of listeners were located in Victoria. As the Great Depression began, 14 stations came on the air from 1930-1930, to keep the Australian public informed. However, only three of these stations were owned by the Australian Broadcasting Company. This was due to ABC's struggle to return a profit, due to all of its resources going to regional stations in Newcastle, Rockhampton, and Albury. Port Pirie was the location of the ABC's last regional station.

In May 1932, the government passed the Australian Broadcasting Commission Act, marking the fourth major change to broadcasting in just ten years. Postmaster General Department's director Harry Brown had decided a national broadcasting system would be more appropriate for the nation. Required by the new Act, the ABC commission was to take over the studios of the company and 'broadcast from the National Broadcasting Stations adequate and comprehensive programs in the interests of the community.

The contract with the Australian Broadcasting Company expired on 30 June 1932 and thereafter programming for the National Broadcasting Service was provided by the newly established Australian Broadcasting Commission which purchased the assets of the earlier ABC.

== Radio stations ==
Under the NBS, the following stations were broadcasting:

1. 2BL located in Sydney, NSW
2. 2FC located in Sydney, NSW
3. 2NC located in Newcastle, NSW
4. 3AR located in Melbourne, Vic
5. 3LO located in Melbourne, Vic
6. 4QG located in Brisbane, Qld
7. 5CL located in Adelaide, SA
8. 6WF located in Perth, WA

The Australian Broadcasting Commission acquired the Company. On the 1 July 1932 radio announcer Conrad Charlton began the day's broadcast at 2BL and/or 2FC, saying; "This is the Australian Broadcasting Commission." At 8pm the Commission was formally opened by the Prime Minister, Joseph Lyons, speaking from Canberra. Lyons proclaimed his strategic direction for the company, saying its purpose was to provide 'information, entertainment, culture, and gaiety and serve all diversified tastes of the Australian Public.'

The 1932 Opposition Leader, James Scullin, also stated the company's other main purpose which was to ensure that broadcasting under national control must not encourage misrepresentation or suppression. As Dr. Earle Page, leader of Country Party said, radio was indeed a luxury in Australia, but a necessity for farmers who used broadcasting information to set prices for their produce.

The ABC remains Australia's only advertisement-free and public broadcaster with almost twenty million viewers and listeners per week. The Scullin Labor government at the time passed the Australian Broadcasting Commission Act 1932 in response to the mishandling of the 1927 royal commission. Upon the acquisition, the radio station broadcast did not change, they were just now the responsibility of the ABC Commission. Formally, they were the responsibility of the ABC company. Most of the ABC companies 250 workers chose to stay and work for the new commission. Company manager C.F. Marden decided to move to 2UW and join Doyle, Fuller and Albert.

== Radio announcers ==
=== Charles Moses ===
Sir Charles Moses CBE joined the Australian Broadcasting Company in 1929, and was General Manager from 1935 to 1965. Based in the Melbourne office, he used his voice on air for B class radio stations. According to ABC manager at the time Bernard Heinze, Moses had the perfect voice for broadcasting. Moses began commentating for ice hockey soon after his voice audition.

In August 1930, Moses was promoted to an announcer, where he earned seven pounds per week. For the time, this was double the minimum wage. He worked a total of fifty hours per week at the ABC. By mid-1932, he was earning eight pounds per week. He achieved this by arranging announcer rosters and coordinating news sessions. He also earned this money by describing sports and doing fifteen-minute news commentary up to three times per week. By the time the ABC commission Act came into effect, Moses was 32 years old and decided to take a job with the commission.

Prior to taking on a managerial role, he was primarily a sports commentator.

=== Conrad Charlton ===
"Con" Charlton was the first Chief Announcer. His two sons, Tony and Michael, also became broadcast personalities: Tony as a sports commentator on commercial television and Michael on ABC-TV.

=== Mel Morris ===
Mel Morris was primarily a sports commentator.

=== Bobby Bluegum ===
Bobby Bluegum was the nom-de-plume of Frank Hatherley. He was the first children's session presenter.

=== Alfred (Alf) Andrew ===
Alf Andrew was one of the ABC's first broadcasters. He later broadcast on 3UZ, 2UW and 3AK.

=== Rupert Hazell ===
Rupert Hazell, a pioneer broadcaster at Melbourne's 3LO, was dismissed in 1926 for producing two 78 rpm (or actually 80 rpm) recordings under the title, "3.O.L. (A Radio Fan's Dream)". These were spoofs on 3LO's contemporary style of broadcasting. Although they were a send-up, ironically, they give contemporary listeners an insight into what radio sounded like in its early days.

== See also ==
- History of the Australian Broadcasting Corporation
- History of broadcasting in Australia
