= Russell Woolf =

Australian radio presenter (1964–2021)

Russell Lesley Woolf (1964 – 26 October 2021) was an Australian media personality who was best known as a presenter on ABC Radio Perth in Western Australia.

== Early life ==
Woolf was born and raised in Perth. He attended Carmel School. After finishing high school he spent a year in Israel before returning to Perth to study at the University of Western Australia and Curtin University. In his mid-20s, he studied broadcasting at the Western Australian Academy of Performing Arts.

== Career ==
He worked as a presenter for 6SE Radio West in Esperance for 18 months, then spent two years at 6KG in Kalgoorlie, before joining the Australian Broadcasting Corporation (ABC) in 1997 as its Karratha-based resources reporter, a position he held for five years. Woolf then returned to Perth where he co-hosted 720's afternoon show with Verity James. In 2005 he took over the late afternoon Drive program, where he remained until resigning from the ABC in December 2013.

Woolf was also the weather presenter for Perth's ABC News from 2007 to 2011. The role was removed by the ABC for budgetary reasons; subsequently the weather was presented by the main newsreader (Karina Carvalho at the time).

Woolf was an ambassador for the Western Australian Commissioner for Children and Young People, and a patron of Inclusion WA.

He was a candidate in the 2014 WA Senate by-election (together with Verity James) on a "Save Our ABC" platform.

In 2015, Woolf announced he was moving with his family to the United States, leaving his position as host of Saturday Breakfast on 720 after his last show on 12 December 2015.

He returned to ABC Radio Perth in January 2019, co-presenting the weekday Breakfast program with Nadia Mitsopoulos. In January 2021, Mitsopoulos moved to the Mornings program, leaving Woolf presenting solo.

== Personal life ==
Woolf was married and the couple had a daughter, born in 2008.

He was Jewish.

== Death ==
Woolf died in his sleep unexpectedly in the early morning of 26 October 2021, at the age of 56. His death was announced on ABC Radio Perth by Woolf's colleague, Geoff Hutchison. Among those who paid tribute to Woolf were Western Australian premier Mark McGowan and former ABC Radio co-host and close friend Nadia Mitsopoulos.

He is buried at Karrakatta Cemetery.
