= Nadia Mitsopoulos =

Australian journalist

Nadia Mitsopoulos (born 1971) is an Australian journalist.

She currently presents the Mornings program on ABC Radio Perth.

== Career ==
Mitsopoulos began her journalism career in 1991 with Golden West Network based in Albany, Western Australia. She joined Network Ten in 1993 and, after a stint with Associated Press Television News in London, moved to STW in Perth in 1998. Mitsopolous was with STW for 13 years, working mainly as the station's state political reporter.

In 2011, she joined the Australian Broadcasting Corporation.

In January 2019, Mitsopoulos began co-presenting, with Russell Woolf, the weekday Breakfast program on ABC Radio Perth. She moved to the Mornings program in January 2021.

Mitsopoulos is on the board of Lifeline.

== Personal life ==
Mitsopoulos is married and has two children.
