= Kirke =

Kirke is a surname. Notable people with the surname include:

- Alexis Kirke, British composer and filmmaker
- Álvur Kirke (born 1939), Faroese politician
- Basil Wharton Kirke (1893–1958), Australian radio executive
- David Kirke (died 1654), English adventurer, colonizer and governor
- George Kirke (died 1675), Scottish courtier
- Gord Kirke (born 1945/1946), Canadian sports and entertainment lawyer
- Ian Kirke (born 1981), English rugby league footballer
- Jemima Kirke (born 1985), English-American artist, actress and director
- Lola Kirke (born 1990), English-American actress and singer-songwriter
- Percy Kirke (c. 1646–1691), English soldier, son of George Kirke
- Simon Kirke (born 1949), English rock drummer and songwriter
- Sir Walter Kirke (1877–1949), English general in WWII

== See also ==
- Kirk (disambiguation)
- Kirke University, fictional setting of Campus (TV series)
- Circe
