= Out of the Fiery Furnace =

1983 Australian documentary TV series

Out of the Fiery Furnace is a seven-part documentary series which was completed for ABC television in Australia in 1983. The series traces the discovery and use of metals, minerals, and energy resources through time and was shown in over twenty countries. It was produced by Robert Raymond, was written by Robert Raymond and Michael Charlton and was directed by Chris McCullough. Supported by the Rio Tinto group (via CRA Services Ltd) it consisted of seven episodes, each an hour in duration. Australian nuclear power advocate Ian Hore-Lacy was closely involved with the production.

== Episodes ==
1. "From Stone to Bronze"
2. "Swords and Plowshares"
3. "Shining Conquests"
4. "The Revolution of Necessity"
5. "Into the Machine Age"
6. "From Alchemy to the Atom"
7. "The Age of Metals: Can it Last?"

== Broadcasts ==
Out of the Fiery Furnace premiered in the US in 1986. In 1986 the series was used by the University of Pennsylvania as a teaching aid and was available to other American institutions via the PBS Adult Learning Center. It continued to air on television in the USA through the late 1980s (often during prime time) and early 1990s including on cable channel TLC in 1993 and 1994.

== Book ==
The subject matter of the documentary series was covered in a book, also titled Out of the Fiery Furnace and also the work of Robert Raymond.
