= Robert Raymond =

Australian journalist (1922–2003)

Robert Raymond OAM
- Born: Robert Alwyn Raymond; 7 July 1922; Canungra, Queensland, Australia
- Died: 26 September 2003 (aged 81); Sydney, Australia
- Education: The Skinners' School, Tunbridge Wells; Henry Mellish County School, Nottingham
- Occupations: TV producer; director; writer; filmmaker; journalist
- Parent(s): Joe Raymond (father); Ethel Raymond (mother)

Robert Alwyn Raymond OAM (7 July 1922 – 26 September 2003) was an Australian Logie Award winning producer, director, writer, filmmaker and journalist. A pioneer of Australian television, he with Michael Charlton in 1961, co-founded the Australian Broadcasting Corporation's flagship public affairs television program Four Corners, which is still running to this day.

== Early life ==
Born on 7 July 1922 in the small rural town of Canungra, in south-eastern Queensland, he was the youngest of five children (one brother and three sisters). His father, Joe, was country school master who spent most of his career in the outback and had an obsessive interest in bee-keeping.

In 1934, Joe died after a bout of pneumonia at the age of 60. Raymond's mother, Ethel, decided to move to England where his siblings were living at the time. There, he completed his secondary education at The Skinners' School in Tunbridge Wells and Henry Mellish County School in Nottingham. The outbreak of World War II, however, made it impossible for him to take up a place which he had been offered at the University of Cambridge in 1938.

== Journalism career ==
Determined to follow his brother, Moore, into journalism, Raymond headed for Fleet Street where he started as a cadet on The Daily Sketch in 1940. Unsatisfied, he moved soon after to London offices of the Sydney afternoon paper, The Daily Mirror and then to the London arm of the Australian Broadcasting Corporation. However, after just 18 months he found himself back at the Mirror. He lived in London through the Blitz and later, the V-1 and V-2 offensives, and in 1944, as a 22-year-old and the youngest accredited war correspondent in Europe, took part in the D-Day invasion. After the war, Raymond remained in the UK, writing for the Picture Post, Illustrated, Everybody's and The Daily Mirror (where he was an early scriptwriter of the long-running comic strip Flook) and between 1948 and 1952 his own column, a critical perspective on the press called 'So They Say...’ appeared in The New Statesman and Nation.

A short stint as Press Officer for the Volta River aluminium project on the Gold Coast, now Ghana, began in 1953, and in 1957 he joined the personal staff of Prime Minister Kwame Nkrumah, with responsibility for the foreign press during the country's independence festivities.

== Return to Australia ==
With those celebrations over, Raymond returned to Australia, joining the Talks Department of the ABC and, in 1961, founding Australia's longest running current affairs program, Four Corners, with Mike Charlton. In the same year Raymond began a collaboration with Professor Stuart Butler from the University of Sydney, with whom he wrote the newspaper strip Frontiers of Science for the next 19 years, a major feature distributed all over the world in up to a dozen languages. Thus began one of the most distinguished careers in Australian television, current affairs and documentary history.

As producer and director of Four Corners during the first 3 years of the program's life, Raymond brought events occurring all over the world into the homes of Australia's first generation of television viewers. In 1963, he set up the Special Projects Division for the Nine Network, establishing the first documentary unit in Australian commercial television. Between 1963 and 1968 he wrote, produced and presented over 70 one-hour documentaries, shot at home and abroad, including We, the Destroyers, with Alan Moorehead, which established the conservation genre in Australian television. Life and Death on the Great Barrier Reef (1969), Shell's Australia (1971–1975), Discover Australia's National Parks (1978), Pelican's Progress (1979), Out of the Fiery Furnace and Man on the Rim (1988) opened the eyes of all Australians to the world around them. His non-fiction books – from Australia's Wildlife Heritage (1975) and Australia: The Greatest Island (1979) to Fifty-Two Views of Rudy Komon (1999) and his three volumes of autobiography, offer unique insights into the natural and cultural world of 20th century Australia.

== Awards ==
On 26 January 1998, he was awarded the Medal of the Order of Australia for "service to the media and television industry, particularly as a director and producer of television documentaries and public affairs programs".

On 9 May 2003, he received an honorary Doctor of Letters degree from the University of Sydney.

== Personal life ==
Raymond married Marion and had two children, Robert and Candy. He and Marion were divorced after 25 years; his subsequent marriage in 1978 to Angela, the former wife of Clyde Packer, had been his great strength since they became partners in 1973.

Raymond's last years were blighted by ill health. He died on 26 September 2003. He left behind his wife, his two children, five grandchildren and two great-grandchildren.

== See also ==
- Ron Taylor
- Valerie Taylor
- Ron and Valerie Taylor's shark filming 1960s for Robert Raymond
