= Liam Bartlett =

Australian journalist and reporter

- Born: 30 June 1961 (age 65); Perth, Western Australia
- Education: University of Western Australia
- Occupations: Radio presenter Television presenter
- Years active: 1982−present
- Television: Seven News
- Spouse: Claire
- Children: 3

Liam Bartlett (born 30 June 1961) is an Australian journalist and reporter, best known for his career in radio and television.

== Career ==
Born in Perth, Western Australia, previously, Bartlett had a six-year stint with ABC Radio Perth, presenting the morning program. He had previously worked for STW9 in Perth and GWN in Bunbury as a news anchor and reporter. He worked for a time at 3SR in Shepparton, Victoria and Triple M Sydney. While working on Perth radio stations, he was also a columnist for the News Corporation newspaper The Sunday Times. He has appeared on television as host of The 7.30 Report in WA, ABC TV and the Nine Network (GTV Melbourne) presenting both current affairs and news.

Bartlett was a delegate to the Australian Constitutional Convention 1998. He was an elected representative, contesting the poll as an independent candidate.

In 2002, Bartlett won a Churchill Fellowship to study investigative journalism. He spent three months in the United States and the United Kingdom.

In July 2006 he left Perth radio station 6PR following a move from ABC Radio Perth to join 60 Minutes, where he would present until 2012, before leaving the media and accepting a role at Shell International's Creative Visual unit based in London. He returned to the Nine Network and 60 Minutes from the 2015 season.

In 2021, Bartlett also returned to 6PR, now owned by Nine Entertainment, to host its morning program while juggling his ongoing role as a reporter on 60 Minutes.

In September 2022, Bartlett announced his resignation from 6PR and 60 Minutes, effective the following November.

In April 2023, Bartlett joined the Seven Network's flagship current affairs program 7NEWS Spotlight as a reporter.

== Controversies ==
=== Deportation from Kiribati ===
In 2019 the Republic of Kiribati detained and then deported Bartlett and a 60 Minutes crew. Government officials said “the Australians had been detained since Tuesday due to "false and misleading information" over the purpose of their visit.

"They [60 Minutes] intentionally came to Kiribati without applying for a permit and then lied about the reason for their visit to immigration officers at the airport."

=== Interview With Republican Candidate Kari Lake ===
In 2022 Trump-endorsed Republican candidate Kari Lake who was running for Arizona Governor labelled Liam Bartlett as “obsessed with President Donald Trump” and used an epithet to cast doubt on Bartlett's sanity after a 15-minute interview for 60 Minutes went off the rails.

The interview started well but went downhill when Bartlett asked, “What’s the personal appeal of Donald Trump for smart people like you?” Bartlett then pursued the idea that to support Trump one must believe the “big lie that the election was stolen.”

=== Spotlight Broadcast ===
On 27 April 2026 Bartlett hosted Channel 7’s Spotlight program ‘Clean, green nightmare’ which criticised the Australian Government’s renewable energy policies, Chinese companies’ involvement, and the use of ‘blood cobalt’ sourced from the Democratic Republic of Congo. (Channel 7 is part of Seven West Media.)

The Australian Broadcasting Corporation program Media Watch said that the program was “selective and misleading” and focused heavily on worst-case mining examples, while ignoring the bigger emissions picture. Media Watch pointed out missing context such the almost complete phasing out of cobalt in batteries, and that industrial mining dominates supply of cobalt, not artisanal child labor.

"The problem is as obvious as it is troubling—Spotlight travelling the world and capturing profound human drama in service of a story about renewables that was never going to stack up, not unless it omitted from its television reports the pertinent statistics, the views of experts, and even the rebuttals of some of those about whom it was making allegations."

"Whatever the public interest in exploring the environmental and human cost of mining critical minerals it was undermined from the outset by the program’s sweeping, unsupportable allegations and its scandalous decision to deny its audience the inconvenient facts."

== Awards ==
During his career, Bartlett has won three international and two national awards for reporting; these include New York Festival awards for both TV and Radio and the Brigitte Bardot (Genesis) Award for TV. In addition, he has been awarded four separate Australian Journalists Association awards for Western Australia for investigative reports and feature writing.

== Personal life ==
Bartlett is married to Claire and they have three children.
