= Bob Maumill =

Australian media personality

Walter Robert Maumill (born 10 March 1938) is a Western Australian radio presenter and writer.

== Early life ==
Maumill was born in Bunbury, Western Australia. His father was Walter William Maumill (a wharf labourer) and his mother Elsie (a barmaid). He moved with his family to South Fremantle as a child. He was educated at South Terrace Primary School, Beaconsfield Primary School and Fremantle Boys High School. He left school at age 15 and travelled Australia in various jobs, mainly with livestock. He worked as an abattoir worker, shearing-shed hand, stable hand, and as a drover in North Queensland. Maumill spent 18 months in the Royal Australian Navy and was later a crew member of a Norwegian cargo ship servicing the Pacific Rim. A lifetime involvement with horses led to a career as a racehorse trainer and later media career—first as a horse-racing journalist and analyst, then as a current-affairs and general talkback radio host.

== Media career ==
As a young man Maumill started writing newspaper articles and stories for publication in horse racing magazines and newspapers. He joined radio station 6IX as a racing analyst and talkback exponent and subsequently moved into current affairs broadcasting with "Maumill at Midday". He then moved to 2SM in Sydney in a dual hosting role with George Moore and then 3XY in Melbourne with Joe Miller. He then made numerous TV appearances, wrote radio and TV columns for the Melbourne Truth (The Big Ear) and Sunday Observer newspapers, the Perth Sunday Independent and community newspapers. He wrote the script for the 1977 Australian movie Blue Fire Lady. In 2021 aged 83 years while recovering from cancer surgery Maumill began writing a novel in the "historical fiction" genre set in Wales and colonial Western Australia. The book, Letters From a Hard Country, was self-published and launched in 2023.

== Later career ==
Maumill was appointed a justice of the peace for Western Australia in 2001. His broadcasts on radio station 6PR were laced with edgy humour, laughter, jokes, interviews, biting satire, political commentary, feature interviews and lifestyle segments in a 3-hour timeslot. In 1992 Maumill won a Radio Industry Award for Best Current Affairs Programme (Metropolitan). Maumill had a long on-off relationship with 6PR that extended over 40 years. In September 2016 Maumill conducted his final broadcast on 6PR.

Maumill spent the early part of 2017 writing 12 stories about his childhood growing up in the port city of Fremantle in the years following World War II. The stories were acquired by Curtin Radio and Maumill was commissioned to narrate the series on Jenny Seaton's afternoon show. Beginning in September 2017, one of the stories was broadcast weekly on Curtin Radio. Following requests from hundreds of listeners, management at Curtin Radio planned to release a CD of the stories in November 2017. Maumill has been twice married and the marriage to his first wife Judith produced three children. One child, a son, died in infancy. The marriage ended in divorce. Maumill met his second wife Sabrina Pilkington in 1981; they married in 1995. Maumill has been a lifelong supporter of the South Fremantle Football Club and a former board member of the Fremantle Football Club. In 2008 Maumill was appointed a vice patron of the South Fremantle Bulldogs, and was made a life member in 2023.
