= Tony Charlton =

Australian sports broadcaster

Tony Charlton AM
- Born: Antony Erling Charlton; 28 March 1929; Sydney, New South Wales, Australia
- Died: 17 December 2012 (aged 83)
- Education: Scotch College, Perth
- Occupations: Television presenter, radio personality
- Years active: 1945–2008
- Relatives: Conrad Charlton (father), Michael Charlton (brother)

Antony Erling Charlton, AM (28 March 1929 – 17 December 2012) was an Australian radio and television sports broadcaster.

== Early life ==
Charlton's parents were both from New Zealand.

His father, Conrad, was a baritone opera singer, who worked with the prominent theatre company of J.C. Williamson's, who became a radio broadcaster and station manager of the ABC, who had served in World War I and was wounded during the Battle of the Somme. His mother, Hazel, was an opera singer.

Tony following his elder brother, journalist Michael Charlton, was born in Sydney. and was educated at Scotch College, Perth, where he captained the First XI cricket team. After moving to Melbourne, he set his sights on the South Melbourne Cricket Club, but was deterred by the high standard of players already on the team, subsequently turning his attention to radio broadcasting with the encouragement of his father.

== Career ==
=== Early radio ===
Charlton began his career at Melbourne radio station 3AW. There he joined veteran presenter Norman Banks for the station's first Australian rules football broadcast, a night match between Essendon and Richmond at the Melbourne Showgrounds in 1952. He later joined John Clemenger Advertising to host the London Stores Football Show and The Kia-Ora Sports Parade, broadcast on 3UZ and 3KZ respectively.

=== Television broadcasting ===
Charlton moved to Channel 9 to cover the 1956 Summer Olympics. In the same year he presented more than 300 two-minute radio interviews with Melbourne identities, targeted at a national American audience. These broadcasts, commissioned by the Victorian Promotion Committee were aired on the NBC radio program Monitor. The following year he joined Channel 7 as a commentator for the first televised Victorian Football League matches. In 1960 he was lured back to Channel 9, where he hosted The Tony Charlton Football Show, a program broadcast on Sunday afternoons in competition with Channel 7's World of Sport. One of the most memorable interviews on the program was with an emotional Norm Smith, following his sacking as coach of the Melbourne Football Club. He also presented a weekly interview program on Channel 9 over a period of four years. The program, Interview with Tony Charlton, was broadcast nationally on Sunday nights with the subjects including British Prime Minister Harold Wilson, United States Senator Robert F. Kennedy, and actor Gregory Peck. In 1967, he broadcast live from Cheviot Beach following the disappearance of prime minister Harold Holt.

Charlton covered a diverse range of major sports events. His commentary was described by sports journalist Martin Flanagan as "slightly ornate" but with "sincerity [that] compelled attention", and delivered with "elegant diction". He was involved in commentary for 5 Olympic Games and 2 Commonwealth Games. His many years of tennis broadcasts included numerous Davis Cup tournaments and Rod Laver's attainment of his second Grand Slam in the 1969 U.S. Open final. In motor sport, he covered Jack Brabham's Formula One World Championship win at the 1966 French Grand Prix. In association with The Age he promoted major golf tournaments over 13 years including the Australian Open, the Australian PGA Championship and the Victorian Open.

Notable televised events that Charlton hosted included the Royal Charity Concert for Queen Elizabeth II at the Sydney Opera House in 1980, a broadcast from Gallipoli for Australia Live in 1988, the VP Day 50th anniversary in 1995 and the Caltex Sports Star of the Year over a period of 30 years.

For more than 25 years, Charlton was MC for Anzac Day ceremonies at the Shrine of Remembrance. He actively supported a number of charities, including the Alfred Hospital Foundation (chairman and life governor), the Royal Flying Doctor Service, Melbourne Legacy, the Australian Olympic Team fund, the Royal Victoria Eye and Ear Hospital, Cancer Council Victoria, the Australian War Memorial appeal, the Shrine of Remembrance restoration appeal and Odyssey House.

== Personal life ==
Charlton was married to wife Loris. He had three children; Jon, Robyn and Cathy.

In 1969 The Australian Women's Weekly reported that he was training to be a pilot and was the owner of two restaurants. Tony owned the Flight Deck on Toorak Rd in South Yarra. Theme based restaurant on a Boeing 727 with views of cities from all around the world.

Charlton died on 17 December 2012 at the age of 83 from bowel cancer.

== Honours ==
He was awarded the Medal of the Order of Australia (OAM) in 1990.

In 2001 he was awarded the Centenary Medal.

In 2003 he was upgraded within the Order of Australia to Member level (AM), "for service to the community through the organisation and promotion of fundraising events to support a range of health, research, rehabilitation and veteran groups in Australia".

In 2011 he was inducted into the Australian Football Hall of Fame.
