= Adam Papalia =

Australian sports commentator

Adam Papalia is an Australian sports commentator for Fox Sports and radio station 6PR.

Papalia has covered an average of 60 games a season calling the NBL, A-League and the AFL, after completing a sports broadcasting course at Edith Cowan University. In 2016, he joined the Fox Footy broadcast team, commentating a game each Saturday, and sometimes on Sunday if there is a game played in Perth. He is also the host of the Perth radio broadcast Wide World of Sports.

Papalia was a part of Nine's Wide World of Sports team for the 2024 Summer Olympics where he called women's basketball and judo.
