= Michael Charlton (academic) =

British academic

Michael Charlton FInstP FLSW MAE is an emeritus professor of Experimental Physics at Swansea University and the vice president of the Learned Society of Wales

== Education ==
Charlton graduated from University College London (UCL) In 1978 with a BSc in physics. In 1980, he won his PhD from the same institution where he worked on his thesis entitled “An Experimental Study of the Interactions of Positrons and Electrons in Gases”.

== Career ==
After winning a Science and Engineering Research Council Postdoctoral Fellowship in 1982, and a Royal Society University Research Fellowship in 1983, Charlton became a Reader in Physics at University College London in 1991. He left University College London in 1999 and was appointed Professor of Physics at Swansea University in that year. In 2001, Charlton was appointed Head of the Department of Physics at Swansea University and held the role until 2007, before taking on the role again from 2012 to 2016. Charlton is currently Emeritus Professor of Physics at Swansea University. Since 2018, Charlton has been Vice President of the Learned Society of Wales.

== Research ==
Charlton's focuses on antihydrogen physics, positron and positronium physics, positron beams and the physics of atomic scattering processes.

== Honours and awards ==
In 1982 Charlton was awarded SERC Postdoctoral Fellowship and in 1983 he was awarded Royal Society University Research Fellowship award. In 2007, he was awarded EPSRC Senior Research Fellowship award and in 2011 he was the Co-recipient of the 2011 American Physical Society James Dawson Award for Excellence in Plasma Physics Research

== Fellowship and membership ==
In 2004 he was elected as the Fellow of the Institute of Physics, in 2011 he became an elected Fellow of the Learned Society of Wales. In 2014 he was elected to the Council of the Learned Society of Wales, in 2018 he was elected as the Vice President of the Learned Society of Wales for STEMM. In 2019 he was elected as a Member of Academia Europaea and the Academy of Europe In 2020, he was awarded the Institute of Physics Thomson Medal and Prize
