= Kirka, Republic of Dagestan =

Kirka Кирка КIиркI
- Selo
- Location within Republic of Dagestan Location within Russia
- Coordinates: 41°32′N 48°11′E
- Country: Russia
- Region: Republic of Dagestan
- District: Magaramkentsky District
- Time zone: UTC+3:00

Kirka (Russian: Кирка; Lezgian: КIиркI) is a rural locality (a selo) and the administrative centre of Kirkinsky Selsoviet, Magaramkentsky District, Republic of Dagestan, Russia. The population was 1,254 as of 2010. There are 20 streets.

== Geography ==
Kirka is located 18 km southwest of Magaramkent (the district's administrative centre) by road. Khorel and Mugergan are the nearest rural localities.

== Nationalities ==
Lezgins live there.
