= Geoff Hutchison =

Australian journalist

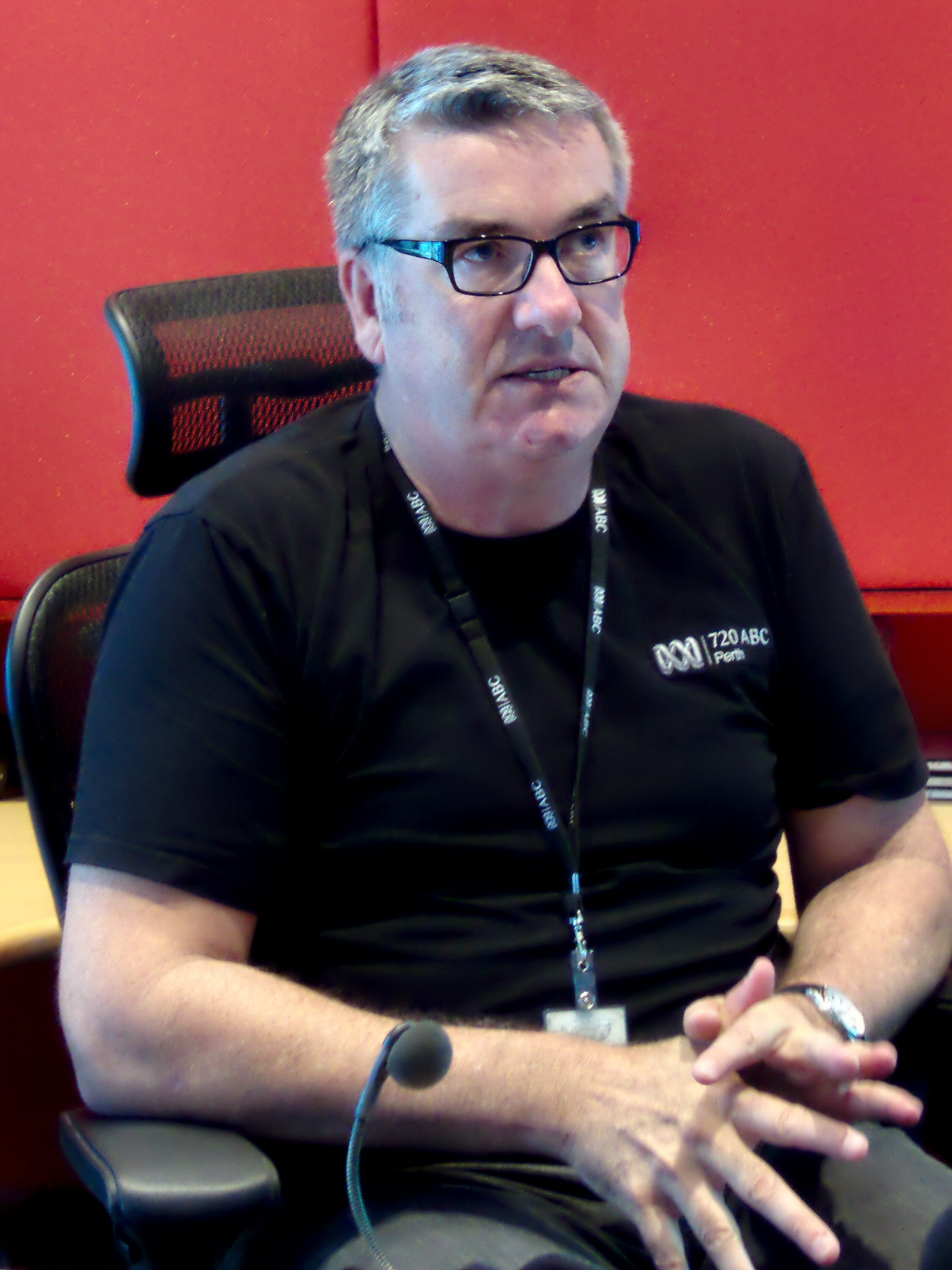
Hutchison in November 2014

Geoff Hutchison is an Australian journalist who presented the Drive program on ABC Radio Perth in Western Australia.

Born and raised in Perth, Hutchison briefly attended the University of Western Australia before winning a cadetship at the Geraldton Guardian newspaper. In 1982 Hutchison moved to Bunbury and joined the Golden West Network, where he presented the late night news. The following year he joined STW-9 in Perth as a sports reporter. In 1986 Hutchison moved to Europe and began a stint as a foreign correspondent for Nine.

In 1998, Hutchison join the Australian Broadcasting Corporation as a senior reporter on The 7.30 Report. He moved to Brussels in 2001 and became the ABC's European correspondent, a position he held until late 2003.

When Liam Bartlett went to commercial radio in early 2006, Hutchison returned to Perth to take up the position as host of 720 ABC's Morning show. Regular program guests include the ABC's medical expert, Norman Swan, Perth lawyer Johnson Kitto and financial planner Nick Bruining.

In 2018, Hutchison moved from Mornings to the afternoon Drive program. He announced that he will step down from the program on 29 November 2022.

In July 2025, Hutchinson published his book How Not to Become a Grumpy Old Bugger. It was shortlisted for the Nonfiction Book of the Year at the 2026 Western Australian Premier's Book Awards.

== Personal life ==
Hutchison is married with two adult children. He and his wife live in Fremantle.
