= 6PR =

Radio station in Perth, Western Australia

Coordinates: 31°57′34″S 115°52′26″E

6PR Perth
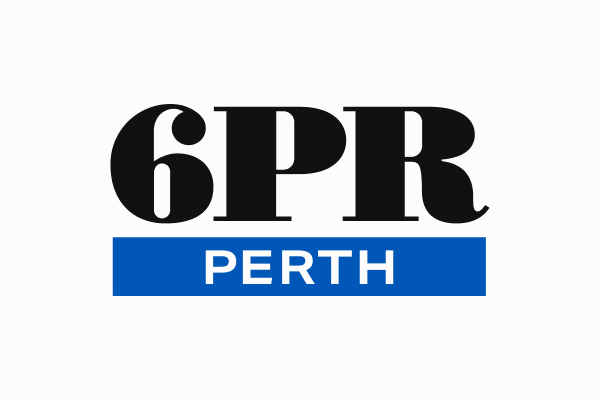
- Perth; Australia
- Broadcast area: Perth
- Frequencies: 880 kHz AM (1931–1978); 882 kHz AM (1978–)

Programming
- Language: English
- Format: News, Talk, Sport, Weather and Traffic

Ownership
- Owner: Tapt Media; (Radio 6PR Perth Pty Ltd)
- Sister stations: 2GB; 3AW; 4BC

History
- First air date: 14 October 1931; 95 years ago

Technical information
- Licensing authority: Australian Communications & Media Authority
- Power: 10 kW

Links
- Website: 6pr.com.au

6PR, known as 6PR Perth, is a commercial radio station based in Perth, Western Australia. Owned by Tapt Media, its focus is on news, talk and sport, and is Perth's only commercial talkback radio station. It commenced broadcasting on 14 October 1931.

== History ==
Radio in Australia was just twelve years old when 6PR commenced broadcasting on 14 October 1931. 6PR was founded by Electrical and Music warehouse company Nicholson's Limited, which operated the station from a studio above its music showroom at 86 Barrack Street. The signal was broadcast from the Applecross Wireless Station. In October 1939 its first relay station 6TZ came on air at Waterloo, 108 miles from Perth, using overhead landlines. This station had to generate its own power, so the on-site technicians had to be familiar with diesel power generating plants.

During World War II, 6PR set up a triple diversity receiving station at the home of George Moss, its only studio technician at Mount Lawley. This was to receive the BBC Radio nine o'clock news from London. George would record this via a landline to the studio on to an acetate disk for replay first on 6PR and then it was taken by bike to 6WF for rebroadcast on the ABC at 9.30 pm. After World War II, AWA's first Broadcast Transmitter was installed at Collie with 6CI relaying the 6PR programme. In 1955, new studios opened at 340 Hay Street East with three studios. This enabled the station to programme the country radio stations separately.

In June 1960, 6TZ-CI began broadcasting from a Studio built at back the Nicholson's Shop in Bunbury, Local programming was from 6 am until 2 pm weekdays and 6PR's programmes for the duration of the weekend. In 1963 the Victorian Broadcasting Network purchased Nicholson's and Nicholson's Broadcasting Services, selling off the electrical and Music Warehouse divisions of the organisation to Vox Adeon. The broadcasting business was retained and operated under the name Nicholson's Broadcasting Service Pty Ltd.

=== 340 Hay Street ===
Throughout the 1960s 6PR was consistently the top rating station in Perth with personalities including Garry Meadows, Barry Martin, Gordon O'Byrne and Trevor Smith but lost its dominance in 1972. The image of the station changed from rock n roll to beautiful music with the "Gentle on Your Mind" promotion in 1973. This boosted 6PR's ratings to a consistent number two with a number one position on several occasions.

In 1977 an agreement was made with the TAB by the station's owners to broadcast races in conjunction with a personality/sport format. In the early eighties the station commenced a more comprehensive news and current affairs format with the introduction of regular programs by Howard Sattler, Bob Maumill and Graham Mabury, which proved extremely popular with listeners.

=== 169 Hay Street ===
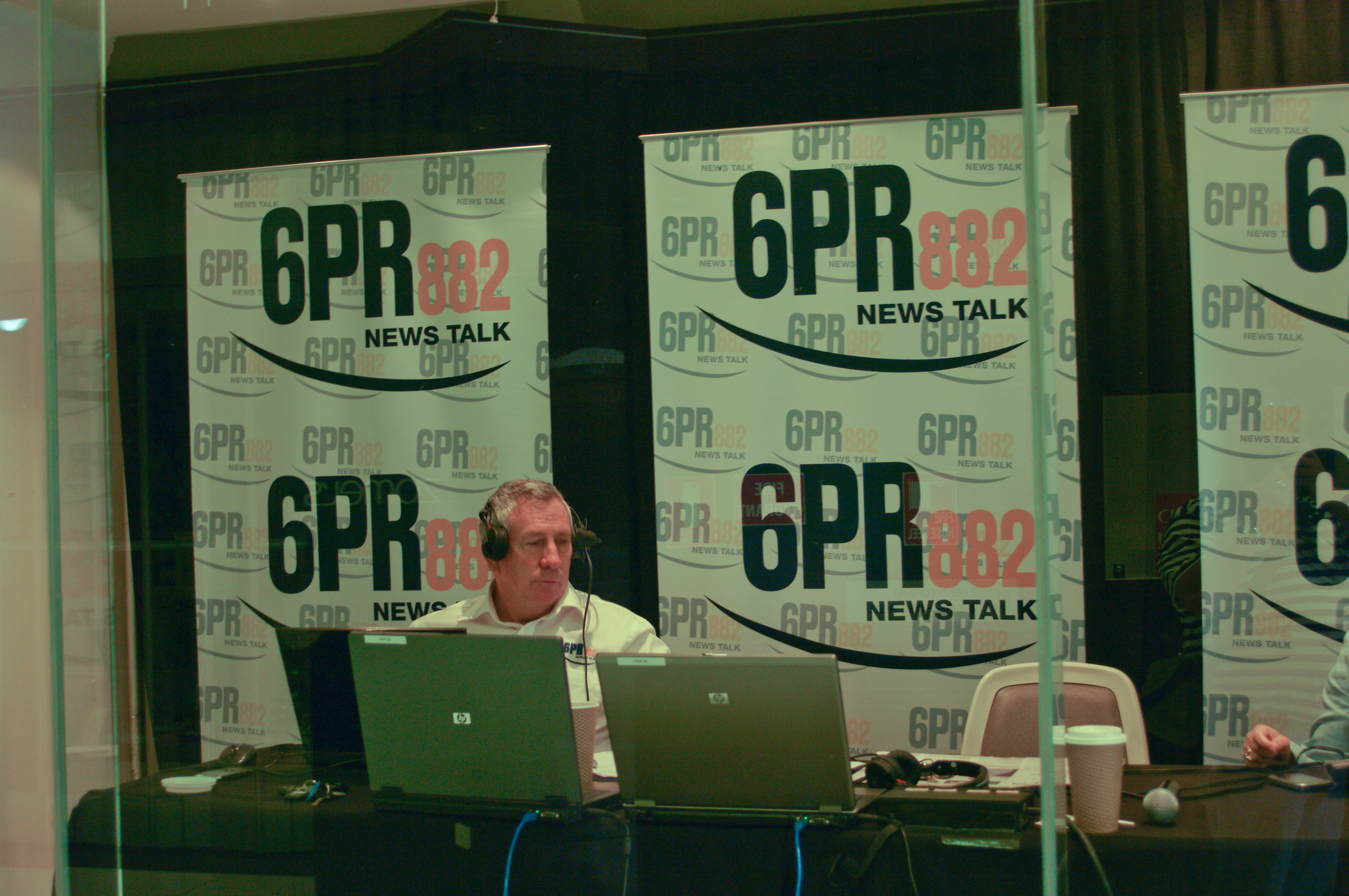
Harvey Deegan broadcasting from an outside broadcast studio during CHOGM 2011

The 6PR studio remained at 340 Hay Street for 22 years before it was demolished to make way for the expansion of Mercedes College. In 1985 the station relocated to its current premises at 169 Hay Street, East Perth. In the station's early days there were only four people on the payroll. Now there are around one hundred. The limited hours of broadcasting in the beginning have gradually been increased to a 24-hour, seven-day-a-week service.

In 1987 the TAB purchased 6PR to secure the future of race broadcasts in Western Australia and races were broadcast across the station during popular talkback programs. During the early nineties the station's current affairs/talkback program hosted by Sattler, Maumill, Mabury, Peter Newman, Gary Carvolth and Rob Broadfield achieved considerable success in spite of the ever-increasing level of racing broadcasts on the station.

In 1994 6PR, in conjunction with the TAB, was able to secure a special narrowcast broadcast licence which allowed racing broadcasts to be moved from 6PR to the narrowcast broadcaster called Racing Radio. This move allowed 6PR to serve its two distinct audiences, those who listened purely for a talkback/news/current affairs format and those who listened just for racing information, in a more comprehensive manner. In December 1994 6PR was purchased by Southern Cross Broadcasting which also owned Melbourne's number one rating talk station 3AW and television stations in Adelaide, Canberra and other places. During the 1990s, 6PR continued its dominance in the talk format arena with personalities such as David Christison & Lee Tate, Howard Sattler, Jenny Seaton & Gary Carvolth, Liam Bartlett, Harvey Deegan and Graham Mabury.

=== Recent years ===
On 11 July 2007, Fairfax Media acquired the former radio assets of Southern Cross Broadcasting (on-sold from Macquarie Media Group's purchase of SCB) this included 6PR along with 96fm who also broadcast from 169 Hay Street. Fairfax also acquired Sydney station 2UE, Melbourne stations 3AW, Magic 1278, and Brisbane stations 4BC, 4BH, as well. Graham Mott general manager at Southern Cross continued in his role as general manager of the broadcast radio group under Fairfax. Mott indicated at the time of the acquisition that national syndication of programming (such as that of the since-retired John Laws) would largely be replaced on the network with more localised syndication at a state level. In 2013, Howard Sattler was sacked following a controversial interview with Prime Minister Julia Gillard where Sattler asked Gillard about her husband's sexuality. He later sued the station for unlawful termination of his contract.

At the end of 2014 Fairfax Media announced a proposal to merge its radio assets including 6PR, with the Macquarie Radio Network (MRN) as of 2026, 6PR is owned by Tapt Media.

In recent years, the station has transitioned into a mainstay of newstalk radio in Perth and in recent changed it line-up considerably. The station occurred major changes in the end of both 2013, 2017 and 2020. Gary Adshead replaced Paul Murray in mornings who was at 6PR on and off from the previous 15 years who later moved to the afternoon slot. But Adshead only lasted in the role for three years before returning to The West Australian as its State Political Reporter, he replaced Gareth Parker in the role who replaced Adshead as mornings host.

Simon Beaumont became afternoon host following Peter Bell's move to ABC Perth radio who filled the afternoon role by Jane Marwick and Tony McManus. Beaumont previously was host of the stations morning program before being replaced as host in 2010 in the role by Murray. Oliver Peterson joined 6PR to host its drive program replacing Adam Shand, Peterson program became known as Perth Live.

Steve Mills was a mainstay in the breakfast slot since arriving at the station in 2004 working with the likes of Tony 'Mac' McManus until 2008 when an on-air falling out saw McManus moved to another shift, Channel 7 broadcaster Basil Zempilas joined Mills from 2014 after previously working in the time slot in the early 2000s. Mills and Zempilas combined until 2020 when Zempilas when the station conflicted with his work at 7 while also becoming the Lord Mayor of Perth, Mills was moved to the afternoon slot in 2021 when mornings host Gareth Parker replaced the pair in the earlier time slot with 60 Minutes reporter Liam Bartlett replacing Parker after returning to the station following a short stint in 2006.

Graham Mabury retired in 2014 who was replaced by overnight host Chris Illsley with weekend overnight host Jon Lewis becoming host of the weekday slot. Bob Maumill also had a retirement in 2016 after working in most slots on the station. Illsley was then controversial dump at the end of 2020 replaced by singer Tod Johnson.

Currently the station is one of the major AM radio stations in Perth, along with ABC Radio Perth, and 6IX. As of 8 December 2020 the ratings show that ABC leads in all time slots, with 6PR second except on weekends where 6IX leads.

== News format ==
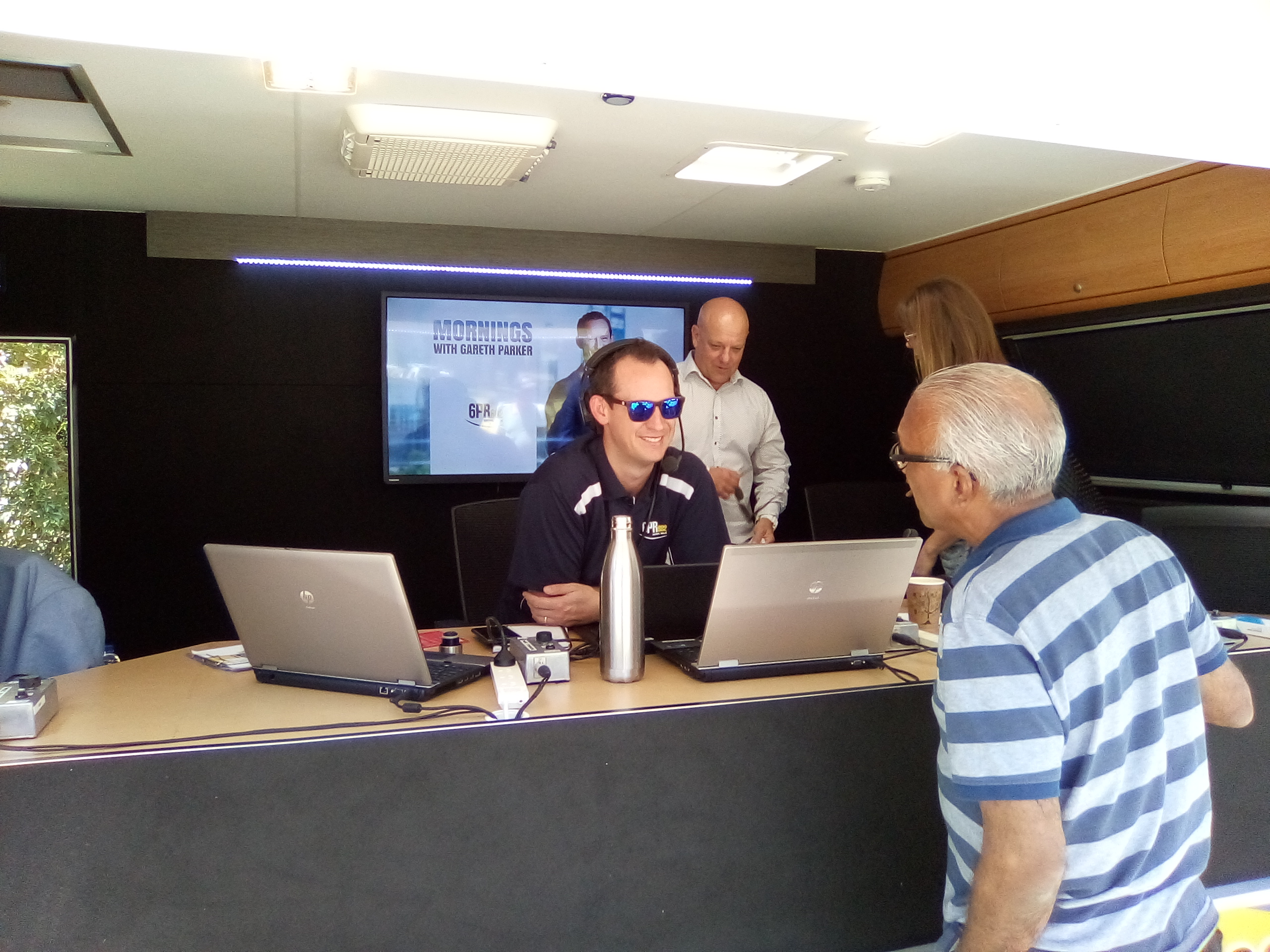
Presenters Gareth Parker and Simon Beaumont in the 6PR Jayco outside broadcasting caravan at the 2019 Have a Go Day

6PR provides hourly news (half-hour during breakfast), traffic and weather bulletins. Its newscasts often run around five minutes. The traffic report can also be heard every 15 minutes throughout morning and afternoon drive.

Current 6PR on-air team (2026)
Program	Host	Time
6PR Breakfast	Steve Mills and Karl Langdon	5 am to 9 am, Monday to Friday
Perth Today	Simon Beaumont	9 am to 12 pm, Monday to Friday
Afternoons	Tod Johnston	12 pm to 3 pm, Monday to Friday
Perth Live	Jamie Burnett	3 pm to 6 pm, Monday to Friday
Wide World of Sports	Mark Readings	5 pm to 7 pm, Monday to Friday
Money News	Clinton Maynard	7 pm to 8 pm, Monday to Thursday
Perth Overnight	Tony McManus	9 pm to 2 am, Monday to Friday
Boat Dive and Fishing Show	Frank Prokop Curtis Waterman	5 am to 6 am, Saturday to Sunday
Weekends	Chrissy Morrissy	6 am to 12 pm, Saturday to Sunday
The Catch-Up	Russell Collett	12 pm to 3 pm, Saturday
Saturday Night	Fred Mafrica	6 pm to midnight, Saturday
Healthy Living	Dr Ross Walker	4 pm to 6 pm, Sunday
Remember When	Harvey Deegan	6 pm to midnight, Sunday

== Sports programming ==
=== Australian rules football ===
The station is one of three radio outlets (the others being ABC Radio Perth and Triple M Perth) contracted to cover Australian Football League matches in the Perth area. The station has also covered matches from the West Australian Football League.

Some matches are broadcast on-relay from sister stations 3AW in Melbourne and FIVEaa in Adelaide.

The station currently commentates every home and away and finals matches involving the West Coast Eagles and Fremantle Dockers and “blockbuster” matches including finals and the grand final from Melbourne.

Current 6PR Football team (2026)
Commentators	Experts	Boundary
Adam Papalia	Will Schofield	
Mark Readings	Glen Jakovich	Hayley Miller
Karl Langdon	David Mundy	Lee Spurr
Mark Foreman	Luke McPharlin	
	Brad Hardie	Paul Hasleby
	Eddie Summerfield	

=== Football (soccer) ===
6PR has broadcast almost all Perth Glory Home and Away matches for the Australian national soccer competition since 1996 (known then as the National Soccer League). 6PR's coverage started in Glory's debut 1996/97 Season and the coverage continued until the demise of the NSL in 2003/2004.

In 2005 the A-League was created and Perth Glory was announced as one of the eight franchise teams. 6PR broadcast Perth Glory's home matches only. However, after the A-League's inaugural season in 2005/2006 6PR announced it would stop broadcasting the Perth Glory, the takeover of Perth Glory by Football Federation Australia is believed to have contributed to 6PR's decision. In 2007 Perth Glory was back in private ownership and 6PR came back on board as the official Radio Broadcast partner of the Perth Glory until 2012 when the station stopped broadcasting due to cricket rights.

=== Cricket ===
Since the 2013/14 Ashes, 6PR has broadcast most test matches that is played in Australia mainly the Perth Test Boxing Day test in Melbourne and the New Year's test in Sydney.

Also since 2013/14 summer, 6PR has broadcast every Perth Scorchers game in the Big Bash League, home and away and finals game involved.
