= Michael Charlton (journalist) =

Australian-born British journalist (1927–2025)

- Born: 1 May 1927; Sydney, New South Wales, Australia
- Died: 24 August 2025 (aged 98); Richmond, London, United Kingdom
- Occupations: Broadcaster; journalist; reporter; sport commentator
- Years active: 1950−1986
- Employer(s): Australian Broadcasting Corporation, British Broadcasting Corporation
- Known for: Four Corners; Panorama
- Relatives: Tony Charlton (brother)
- Awards: Gold Logie

Michael Charlton (1 May 1927 – 24 August 2025) was an Australian-born British Gold Logie winning journalist and broadcaster, who worked for the BBC in the United Kingdom for many years.

The first-ever broadcast of ABC Television—presented by Michael Charlton, 5 November 1956

== Life and career ==
Charlton was born in Sydney to broadcaster Conrad and Hazel Charlton, both born in New Zealand, and was the elder brother of Australian sports broadcaster and Order of Australia recipient Tony Charlton. He initially worked for the Australian Broadcasting Corporation (ABC) as a presenter in current affairs and commentator for Test cricket matches, but later moved to London. He was the Australian representative on the BBC radio cricket commentary team for the 1956 Test series between England and Australia.

In 1961, Charlton was the inaugural presenter of Four Corners, an Australian current affairs program. In 1963 he was the recipient of the Australian Gold Logie award.

From 1962 to 1976, Charlton was a reporter and interviewer for Panorama, reporting live from America in the aftermath of the Kennedy assassination. In July 1969 he reported live from mission control for the BBC during the Apollo 11 Moon landing. Later, during the 1980s, he presented It's Your World, a phone-in programme on the BBC World Service. He also presented the news and current affairs programme Newsday on BBC2 in the 1970s.

Charlton wrote the 1986 seven episode documentary TV series Out of the Fiery Furnace with Robert Raymond. The series traced the development of metallurgy from the Stone Age to the space age. Nuclear industry advocate Ian Hore-Lacy also worked closely with the production team. The series was shown in 20 countries.

Charlton died on 24 August 2025, at the age of 98.

== Awards ==
Association	Award	Year	Work	Result
Logie Awards	Gold Logie	1961	Four Corners	Won

== Selected works ==
Production	Year	Role
Chequers Night Club (TV movie)	1967	Self
Doe's Father Know Best? (TVspecial- short)	1958	Host
1964 General Election (TV documentary)	1964	Himself as host/reporter
Election 70 (TV special)	1970	Himself as Reporter
Personal Choice (TV series)	1970	Himself as Interviewer
Election 74: Part 1 (TV special)	1974	Himself as Reporter
Election 74: Part 2 (TVspecial)	1974	Himself as Reporter
Four Corners	-	
Panorama (TV series)	1963-1972	Self as reporter (21 episodes)
Decision 79 (TV special)	1979	Seldfa reporter
Out of the Fiery Furnace (TV series documentary)	1984	Himself as host
