= Conrad Charlton =

Australian singer and entertainer

- Born: Charleton Conrad Ziesler; 18 May 1888; Otago, New Zealand
- Died: 6 June 1976 (aged 88)
- Occupation(s): Singer, entertainer, radio broadcaster
- Family: Tony Charlton; Michael Charlton(sons)

Conrad Charlton (18 May 1888 – 6 June 1976), often referred to as Con Charlton, was an Australian baritone singer and entertainer, and radio announcer (his was the first voice heard on ABC station 2BL, on 1 July 1932) before being appointed manager for several state branches of the Australian Broadcasting Commission.

== History ==
Charlton was born Charlton Conrad Ziesler in Otago, New Zealand, son of John William Smith Ziesler and Lucy Emma Ziesler, née Wright, and was living at Elizabeth Street, Timaru, New Zealand, when as 2nd Lieutenant Ziesler, he and two brothers volunteered for service with the New Zealand Military Forces during The Great War.

He arrived in Australia some time before March 1922, when, as Conrad Charlton, he appeared in pantomime Dick Whittington as the Wicket Rat, and subsequently toured with "Walter George and his Sunshine Players". He played in revue with the Town Topics company, appeared in various contexts as a baritone singer, occasionally 1925–1930 in duets with tenor Aneurin Morris and as "Con Charlton" in "Billy Maloney's Scandals", his wife appearing as Hazel Fuller. From 1927 to 1929 he was a member of J. C. Williamson's operetta company, touring Madame Pompadour, The Student Prince, The Vagabond King and others. Encouraged by station manager Basil Kirke, he joined Sydney radio station 2BL, in 1930 serving as early morning announcer, led community singing and acted as racing commentator. He gave regular talks on poultry and pigeons on sister-station 2FC from September 1931 to April 1933. By December 1931 he was sufficiently established at 2BL to warrant a caricature in Smith's Weekly.

On 17 May 1932 the Australian Broadcasting Commission Act 1932 was passed by the Australian parliament, and from 1 July 1932, the Commission would be responsible for programming; mechanical and technical provisioning and maintenance was supplied by the Postmaster-General's (PMG) department. On the evening of 30 June the chairman of the Australian Broadcasting Company, Stuart Doyle, made a broadcast relinquishing control, and while wishing the best for the Commission, expressed his reservations for government control of any enterprise.
On the morning of 1 July each station of the network opened at the usual time, with the local announcer pronouncing: "The Australian Broadcasting Commission broadcasting through . . . (the callsign of the station)". That announcer for 2BL (or possibly 2FC) would have been Charlton, though there is no contemporary newspaper corroboration.
At 8:00 pm EST, following the chimes of the Sydney GPO, the Prime Minister (Joseph Lyons), speaking from Canberra, introduced the chairman, Charles Lloyd Jones, who made a short speech, followed by the leader of the Federal Opposition (James Scullin), both in Sydney, and Earle Page of the Country Party in Melbourne. Stations which took part in this link-up were 2BL and 2FC (Sydney), 3AR and 3LO (Melbourne), 4QC (Brisbane), and 5CL (Adelaide), also regional stations 2NC (Newcastle),

At some stage between 1930 and 1936, possibly in March 1933 when his poultry program ended, Charlton was appointed studio manager at 2FC. He took over as station manager of 6WF (and Western Australia branch manager) in May 1936 replacing Basil Kirke, who took over management of the Victorian branch. His first major assignment, given him by general manager Charles Moses, was to broadcast the Perth Anzac Day ceremony Australia-wide. During his tenure in Western Australia, he radically increased that State's involvement in classical music and opera in particular, importing some of the world's finest artists. In 1947 he was appointed ABC State Manager for Victoria and left in late August; his wife followed a month later. Wilbur Reed served as his temporary replacement before Ewart Chapple was appointed to the post.

In May 1953 he retired from the commission, to be replaced by Kirke, and in September 1954 he was appointed Public Relations Officer for The Age newspaper.

== Family ==
Conrad Charlton married Hazel Alice Bernice Fuller (25 September 1894 – 1974) in Sydney on 7 June 1924. Hazel Charlton was heavily involved in the arts scene in Perth: she chaired the committee established to present the People's Patriotic Concerts for the Australian Broadcasting Commission. She was president of the Perth Symphony Orchestral Committee from its inception in 1939 to October 1947. She was a trained soprano and, while in Perth, on occasion took leading roles in concert versions of opera. She trained the Oriana Choir of 35 women and led The Cecilians, a choir of seven women. She also trained the choir of Scotch College, Perth, which their sons attended.

Two sons, Michael Charlton and Tony Charlton, were born in Australia, educated at Scotch College, and became ABC announcers.

- Michael Charlton (born 1 May 1927) was the first face seen on ABCTV when it opened in 1956. He became a Gold Logie-winning journalist and broadcaster, and worked for the BBC in England for many years.
- Anthony Erling Charlton (28 March 1929 – 17 December 2012) was a keen cricketer and became a leading sports commentator on commercial television.
- Diana Charlton (c. 1935 – )
- Peter Charlton (31 July 1938 – ) (Note: not to be confused with (the unrelated) Peter Charlton (1946–2007), journalist and historian, author of The Unnecessary War: Island Campaigns of the South-West Pacific, 1944–45; John Stainer and the Musical Life of Victorian Britain; Pozieres, 1916: Australians on the Somme; State Of Mind - Why Queensland Is Different; South Queensland WWII, 1941–1945; and The Thirty-niners.)
