= Howard Sattler =

Australian radio presenter (1945–2021)

Howard Sattler (23 February 1945 – 11 June 2021) was an Australian talk back radio host.

Sattler began his career as a cadet journalist for the Sydney Morning Herald before performing national service during the Vietnam War, during which he completed officer training and moved to Perth in a public relations position with the Australian Department of Defence. From there he moved into broadcast radio, although he also was a newspaper editor and columnist.

He was considered to have introduced the shock-jock style of radio to Perth. Although well known in his state of Western Australia after a 30 year long career on radio, he gained national notoriety in 2013 when he was fired from radio station 6PR over a controversial interview with former Prime Minister Julia Gillard, in which he asked her whether her partner Tim Mathieson was gay.

In 2018, Sattler was inducted into the Australian Media Hall of Fame.

In his later years he developed multiple health conditions, including throat cancer, and was diagnosed with PSB Steele Richardson syndrome (from which he eventually died), which so affected his speech that listeners would often call in thinking he was drunk. He became a vocal advocate for voluntary euthanasia laws.
