= Basil Kirke =

Australian radio broadcaster

Basil Everal Wharton Kirke (29 March 1893 – 8 January 1958) was a radio broadcaster and executive with the Australian Broadcasting Commission. He gravitated into this field after a varied career in New South Wales and the Pacific Islands.

== History ==
Kirke was born in Armidale, New South Wales, a son of draftsman Samuel Wharton Kirke (c. 1856 – 28 April 1942) and his wife Ellen "Ellie" Wharton Kirke MBE (1866 –10 October 1945), née Clements. All members of his family were named "Wharton Kirke", (Note: The distinguished Lieut-Cmdr Lionel Wharton Kirke (born 23 Oct 1926 in Fremantle) appears not to be closely related. He was son of Edward Wharton Kirke (1901–1954) and Gladys Jane Kirke, née Cooper (1907–1966), grandson of Herbert Lionel Kirke (1874–1953) and Lydia Lloyd Kirke, née Parry (1876–1944) and great-grandson of Tom Kirke of Petersham, New South Wales.) most, Basil Kirke being an exception, using it as a double-barrelled surname, occasionally hyphenated. The family claimed descent from Colonel Percy Kirke, of "Kirke's Lambs" fame.

Mrs Wharton Kirke was awarded an MBE by King George V in recognition of her work during WWI. She founded the Australia Day Fund, which raised £870,000 in New South Wales for the war effort. She designed the first ANZAC medal, of which only four were struck in gold, being awarded to George V, Albert I of Belgium, the Prince of Wales and Mrs Kirke herself. She was credited with initiating Australia Day in 1915, in support of wounded soldiers.

By 1902 the family had moved to Sydney, living at "Arrandoon", Camera Street, Manly. Kirke attended Fort Street School, but was not a conspicuous student academically or in sport. He was active in the lifesaver movement at Manly Beach, and one of the rescuers on 24 February 1914 when a large number of bathers were caught in the "rip" and had to be hauled ashore. He enlisted with the First AIF in November 1914, served with the Australian Medical Corps, caught a bullet wound at Gallipoli on 30 October 1915, subsequently suffered dengue fever, returned to Australia December 1915 and as Private Kirke was discharged in February 1916. He then left by the Atua for Fiji, to take up a post as sub-Inspector in the Imperial Constabulary, and was later posted to Tulagi, Solomon Islands. He was engaged to Amy Holloway of Manly in October 1916. He returned to Sydney to take charge of the new Investigation branch of the RSSILA, whose remit was to assist soldiers in making claims. In August 1918 he was appointed temporary patrol officer of the armed constabulary in Papua, stationed at Kokoda. He was also appointed postmaster at Kokoda, effective from the same date but resigned without taking the position. He was engaged again, to Margaret Tunney, of Young, New South Wales, and the marriage took place on 21 February 1920. They had a home "Jawarere" at Mullumbimby, New South Wales for two years. He was appointed inspector of soldier settlements, Murwillumbah, then in June 1923 quit to try cane farming at nearby Condong, in partnership with one Angus McKinnon.

=== Radio career ===
According to one source, Kirke began working for radio station 2BL in 1924, but did not appear "on-air" until May 1927, when he conducted a twice-weekly physical fitness programme. In late June, as "Uncle Bas", he took over the afternoon "kiddies" programme from "Uncle George" (George A. Saunders), when that pioneer left to manage station 2GB. He gave occasional talks, was a pioneer coursing race-caller on that station, and "called" boxing matches later that year, notably that between Jack "Tiger" Payne (Note: Payne was an African-American medium-heavyweight from Oklahoma, born 22 November 1906, Australian heavyweight champion in December 1926 and 1927–28.) and Charlie Chetwynd. In 1928 he was made chief announcer, and effectively assistant manager, and had acted as publicity officer and advertising manager. He was closely associated with 2BL's engineer Ray Allsop, radio pioneer and technical editor of Wireless Weekly. (1898–1972). They were responsible for several historic outside broadcasts (OB's), notably the last leg of Kingsford Smith's first trans-Pacific flight.

When 6WF Perth was taken over by the Australian Broadcasting Company (ABC) in July 1929, Kirke was brought over as studio manager and chief announcer. One material change the company effected was getting a purpose-built studio for 6WF at the corner of Hay and Milligan streets, rather than sharing the Wellington Street building with the transmitter. The Australian Broadcasting Commission was established by Act of Parliament on 1 July 1932, and took over the assets of the Australian Broadcasting Company. Kirke remained as manager of 6WF — significantly the number of radio licences issued had increased from 3,900 to 12,500 during his tenure, and despite an obsolete and inefficient transmitting plant.

In a major reorganization of the Commission in 1936, Kirke was transferred to Melbourne as acting/assistant manager for Victoria, replacing composer-pianist William G. James. At a civic farewell, the Lord Mayor of Perth, J. J. Poynton, said:

"For seven years Mr Kirke has carried the burden of running the Perth national broadcasting station and the standard he has set will be a worthy mark for his successor, Mr Charlton. Mr Kirke has been a good citizen. More cannot be said of anyone than that. He has gone outside his job to do things that are useful to the community. Because we like him so much, we are pleased that he is passing to a higher position.

Other farewells were given by returned soldiers, film makers, and the arts community. Kirke became manager for Victoria when T. W. Bearup was given an overseas posting. Barely a year later, in November 1937, he was appointed manager for the New South Wales division, and Robert Clark McCall, later a BBC executive, succeeded to the Victorian post. In 1939 Kirke established a foreign-language short-wave service, which became Radio Australia. In 1946 he resigned to take up the post of Controller of broadcasts in External Territories, based in Port Moresby, but disillusioned at the slow rate of change, left in 1950 and was seconded to the committee organising the re-enactment of Charles Sturt's pioneering trip down the Murray.

On his return to the ABC he was appointed inspector at head office, Sydney. In 1952 he acted as assistant general manager during Charles Moses' absence overseas. In February 1953, at Kirke's request, he was again appointed the ABC's manager for Western Australia, replacing Ewart Chapple, who was on long-service leave, and on returning would replace Charlton as manager for Victoria.

He died in Perth of hypertensive heart disease. In 1961 the ABC Perth's new studio complex at 191 Adelaide Terrace was named for him. In 2005 the building was vacated and heritage-listed.

== Family ==
Samuel Wharton Kirke (c. 1856 – 28 April 1942) married Ellen F. de Salis "Ellie" Clements (1866 – 10 October 1945) on 18 June 1885. Their children included:

- Hazel Marie Wharton Kirke (1886–1953) married Dr Roland Mastai Lane (c. 1877 – 14 March 1926) of AAMC. She was honored by Albert, King of Belgium, with the Order of Queen Elisabeth of Belgium.
- Maj. Errol Wharton Kirke (28 October 1887 – 4 August 1916) was born in Dubbo, married Gwyneth Holland in April 1916. He had enlisted with the First AIF and was killed at Pozieres.
- Clement Wharton Kirke (1889–1965) married Olga Constance Mary Mater (1889–1968) of Braidwood, New South Wales in Singapore, on 26 May 1914. They divorced 1933. He was surveyor to the Imperial Government in the Malay States.

- daughter (1 August 1922 – )

- Basil Everal Wharton Kirke (29 March 1893 – 8 January 1958) born in Armidale, New South Wales, enlisted in Liverpool NSW, was injured and returned as an invalid. He married Margaret Ann Tunney (c. 1900 – 19 June 1926) of Young, New South Wales on 21 February 1920. They had one son:

- Craig Peter Wharton Kirke (24 November 1921 – 16 November 1997) was born in Mullumbimby, New South Wales, appointed Honorary Consul of Finland in Port Moresby.
He married again in Fremantle, to Jessie Craig Cahill (c. 1905 – ) on 6 November 1929. They had one son:
- Errol Kirke (born 29 June 1932)

- Hunter Wharton Kirke MC (c. June 1894 – 2 June 1978) born in Armidale NSW, enlisted in Liverpool, NSW.
