= ABC Radio Perth =

Radio station in Perth, Western Australia

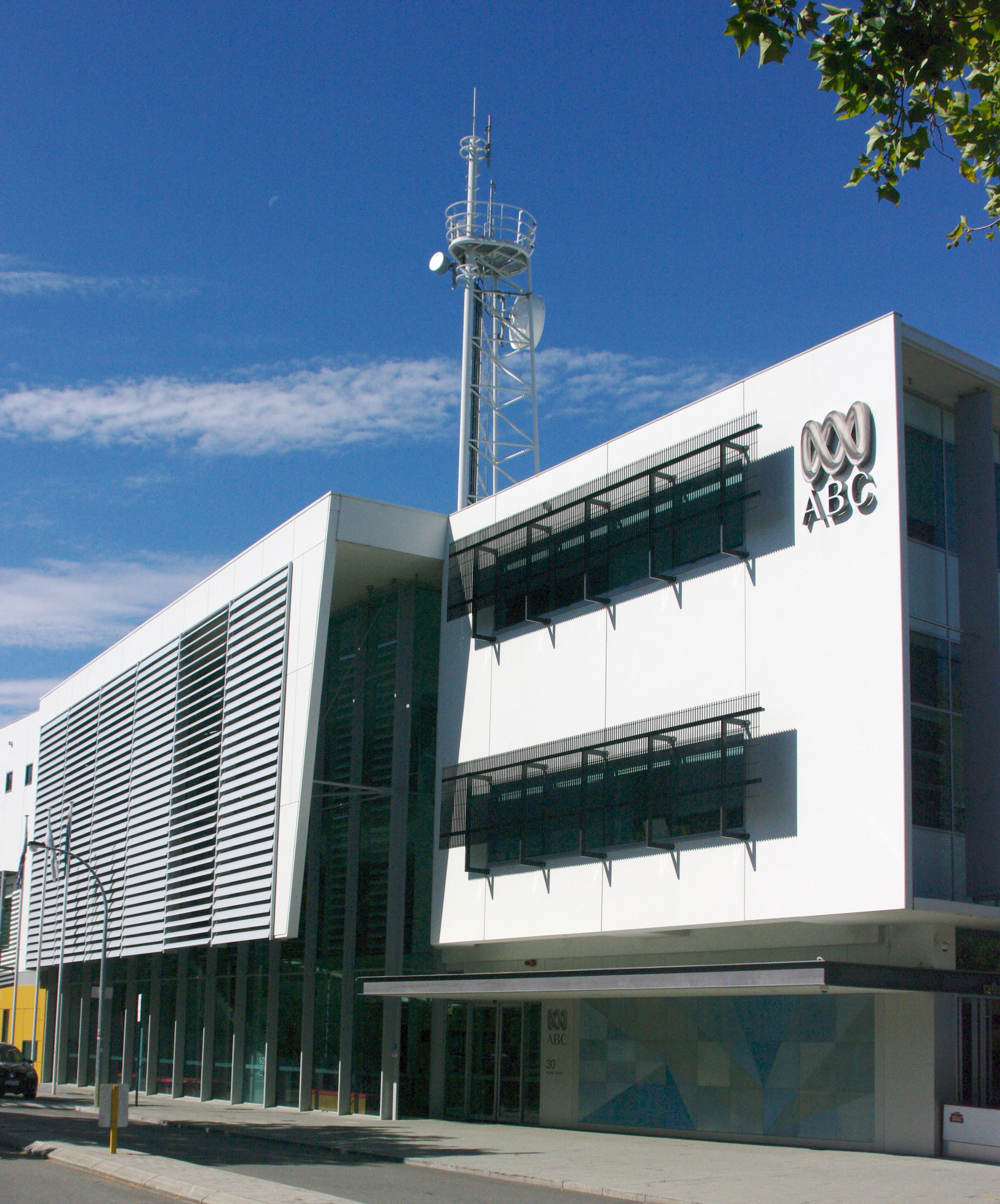
- Perth, Western Australia; Australia
- Broadcast area: Perth, Western Australia
- Frequency: 102.5 MHz FM

Programming
- Format: Talk

Ownership
- Owner: Australian Broadcasting Corporation

History
- First air date: 4 June 1924; 102 years ago
- Former frequencies: 240 kHz (1924-1929); 690 kHz (1929-???); 720 kHz (???-2026)
- Call sign meaning: Westralian Farmers (original owner)

Technical information
- Licensing authority: Australian Communications & Media Authority
- Power: 50 kW
- ERP: 164 kW FM
- Transmitter coordinates: 31°51′21″S 115°49′4″E

Links
- Website: abc.net.au/perth

ABC Radio Perth (call sign: 6WF) is a radio station located in Perth, Western Australia, operated by the Australian Broadcasting Corporation, broadcasting on 102.5 MHz FM. It is the flagship ABC Local Radio station in Western Australia.

The station was established under the Sealed Set scheme by Westralian Farmers in 1924, sold to the Commonwealth Government in 1928 and provided with programmes by the Australian Broadcasting Company, became part of the Australian Broadcasting Commission in 1932, which became the Australian Broadcasting Corporation in 1983.

== History ==
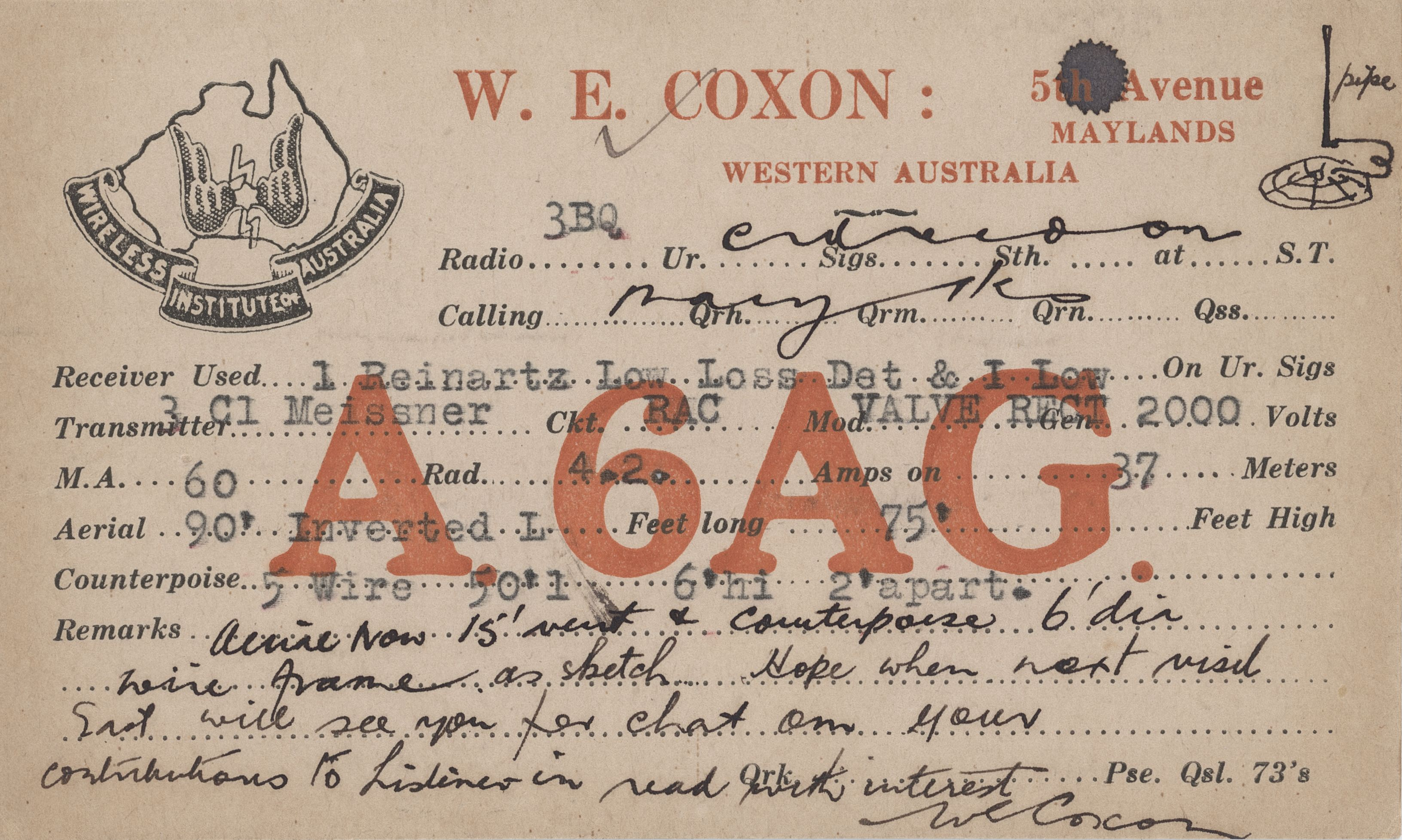
QSL card from VK6AG Wally Coxon, first chief engineer of 6WF, to VK3BQ Max Howden, ca 1926. Wally's transmitter provided a shortwave simulcast of 6WF on 3 MHz for several years in late 1920s

=== Westralian Farmers era ===
6WF transmitted its first broadcast on the evening of Wednesday 4 June 1924 and in doing so established a number of records. It was the first "high powered" station to commence in Western Australia. It was the last such station to commence using longwave (1250 metres, 240 kHz) being promoted by AWA at the time for its own monopolistic purposes. It was also the last Australian station to commence under the ill-fated Sealed Set scheme established by the Wireless Regulations of 1923.

==== Background ====
In a May 1922 broad overview of the status of wireless in Australia, The West Australian highlighted the recent establishment of the USA Department of Agriculture's radio farm service providing weather and market reports to farms, as well as other news of importance to agriculturalists. The philosophy of this service was embodied in the objects of Westralian Farmers' 6WF broadcasting service.

Unlike other Australian states, Western Australia never had a strong amateur broadcasting regime which encouraged the development of the local wireless industry. Wally Coxon (callsign: 6AG) was broadcasting intermittently from 1921. After his appointment as chief engineer for 6WF in late 1923, he transmitted a regular Sunday evening concert to boost sales of the Mulgaphone and establish a future audience for 6WF. Coxon was possibly the first to identify the need for a high power station for Perth and WA. The only other regular Perth broadcaster at the time was 6BN Bert Stevens transmitting Wednesdays at 8pm, while 6AB Clyde Cecil transmitted at 8 pm on Mondays and Thursdays from Kalgoorlie. The idea of the Westralian Farmers station was initiated by John Thomson, manager of their Wheat Department, and eventually taken up by Basil Murray. Thomson was appointed General Manager in May 1925.

Westralian Farmers was not the only group interested in the licence for the Perth high powered station. In July 1923, Len Matters, a prominent Perth journalist toured the Eastern States on behalf of a newly formed group West Radio Broadcasting Company Ltd. which was interested in the Perth station as part of a wider Australian network. In late August 1923 there was a meeting of Perth electrical traders and wireless importers which was widely attended. The meeting voted to form the Wireless Development Association of WA and to amalgamate with firms interested in a broadcasting licence for Perth. But as early as late July 1923, Westralian Farmers was publicising its firm intention to establish a broadcasting service focused on serving its client farmers and rural communities, noting the high costs they were already incurring in telegraphing stock and harvest information throughout the state. At Westralian Farmers ninth annual meeting in October 1923 it was quietly announced by Basil Murray (managing director) that they had not only been issued WA's first broadcasting licence, but also had signed contracts for the installation of the facility.

The path to establishment of the station was fraught with difficulties. The chosen transmitter supplier was AWA, which had a wider agenda than the provision of a service to WA. Planning for future economic viability of the station was obscured by industry opposition to sealed sets and likely issue of new wireless regulations.

==== Opening ====
It was originally owned by Westralian Farmers, and operated from a studio in the Westralian Farmers building in Perth. The Premier of Western Australia, Philip Collier made a speech on-air to mark the opening of the station.

The station commenced operation with an input power to the transmitter final stage of 500 watts (about 150 watts under the transmitter power rating scheme applied since 1930). This transmitter was supplied by AWA and manufactured at their Radio-electric Works. Transmitter installation was oversighted by AWA's Sydney Trim. The station was equipped with a transmitter that was the most powerful allowed under Commonwealth regulations. It was intended as a source of "information and entertainment to rural areas". The station's original broadcast footprint covered most of the state of Western Australia.

The antenna for the initial 6WF facility was established on the rooftop of the Westralian Farmers building at 569 Wellington Street in the central business district of Perth. The use of a longwave frequency necessitated careful consideration of the antenna design due to the limited rooftop real estate. The antenna was a 4-wire cage inverted "L" type, erected on two steel tube masts 90 ft. high, and 160 ft. apart. The masts were 6in. in diameter at the bottom, tapering to 4in. at the top. The spreader hoops in the antenna were of copper and approximately 70in. in diameter. The lead-in was also of the cage type on one foot ring spreaders. The counterpoise was of 8 parallel wires, spaced about 6 ft. apart and running the full length of the building, about 200 ft. The counterpoise was placed some feet above the iron roof of the building, while both the antenna and counterpoise were connected to 2 copper rods which were led through two large cone-shaped insulators and then to the aerial matching coil in the transmitting room. The antenna-earth connection was made by a large switch installed in the transmitting room.

For the first six months after commencement there were regular announcements that the 5,000 watt transmitter would be commissioned soon. It was noted that the initial 500 watt transmitter would serve as the driver stage for the higher power unit. The commissioning of the high power transmitter was not just important for the wider coverage area of the station. Under the Wireless Regulations 1924, an A class station was only entitled to its share of the licence fee once the service was operating at 5000 watts. The Postmaster-General's Department was routinely identifying unlicensed listeners with its team of radio inspectors led by George Scott, but discretion was exercised in not taking legal action. In December 1924 the first prosecution took place and this served to encourage listeners to take out licences and thereby support the Westralian Farmers station.

==== Shortwave parallel ====
In June 1925, Wally Coxon's amateur station 6AG was heard carrying 6WF programming on 100 metres shortwave (3 MHz). It was confirmed that this was an initial test, but the objective was not identified. The tests were heard as far afield as Adelaide, SA. Again in February 1926, 6AG was rebroadcasting 6WF on 40 metres and these tests were heard as far as Colombo.

==== Longwave vs mediumwave ====
The decision to establish 6WF on a longwave (1250 metres, 240 kHz) in 1924 was not taken lightly. Although AWA was heavily promoting longwave to prevent importation of cheap receivers from the USA, 6WF's chief engineer investigated the matter and supported the decision. There are many generic aspects to be considered:

- Receivers covering longwave are more expensive to manufacture as an additional large RF coil(s) is required.
- USA, the powerhouse manufacturer of cheap receivers, did not utilise longwave for broadcasting, therefore very few USA receivers made provision for longwave and could not receive the longwave stations here. Heavy tariffs on receiver imports into Australia have the potential to reduce or eliminate potential cost advantages of imported receivers.
- Daytime propagation is by means of the groundwave mode and on a given path a longwave signal will propagate much further than a mediumwave signal. This aspect had particular significance for 6WF with coverage objectives including the whole of the State of Western Australia.
- Night-time propagation is extended beyond that of the groundwave by means of skywave refractions from the ionosphere. Skywave signals do not greatly differ, as between longwave and mediumwave, but the stronger groundwave signal on longwave increases the radius to fading compared to mediumwave.
- The greater wavelength of longwave transmissions preferably requires a proportionally larger antenna system for equal radiation efficiency. This creates greater real estate requirements where the radiation system is located on the ground. Also efficiency is typically limited when available area is less, such as rooftop installation as employed initially by 6WF.
- In a given city where both longwave and mediumwave stations are deployed, the greater frequency range utilised minimises potential for adjacent channel interference and reduces tuning difficulty.
- Static levels are much greater with longwave compared to mediumwave, particularly at night-time and tend to detract from the greater available day-time (groundwave) coverage. The impact of higher static levels on longwave can be ameliorated by the use of a shortwave transmitter carrying parallel programming due to the greatly lessened static levels on shortwave.

==== 1920s ====
The PMGD announced amounts paid to the Class A stations to 30 May 1925. Out of a total pool of £113,658 received as broadcasting receiving licence fees, 6WF was allocated only £4,220, compared to 2FC Sydney which received £34,628. Operating expenses would be comparable for both stations, but even after adjustment for 6WF only being entitled to fees since about November 1924 (when 5 kW operation commenced), 6WF was receiving about one quarter of that of 2FC. In 1929 the radio station was sold to the Australian Broadcasting Company. As a result, the radio station moved from the Westralian Farmers buildings to the ESA Bank building on the corner of Hay and Milligan streets in Perth. When the Australian Broadcasting Commission was founded in 1932, 6WF became part of the national network. Basil Kirke, from 2BL, was manager under both regimes (July 1929 – May 1936), followed by Con Charlton (May 1936 – August 1947) then Ewart Chapple (September 1947 – December 1953).

=== Postmaster-General's Department era ===
Uniquely in Australian broadcasting history, 6WF was owned and operated by the Postmaster General's Department from late 1928 to mid 1929. Due to the Great Depression, 1928 was a time of major economies in Government expenditure and the PMG being the largest department bore the brunt, with the majority of its capital budget cancelled. With no funds to work with PMG Gibson threatened to cancel the licences of the Class A stations who did not improve services and co-ordinate between themselves. In March 1928, Thomson announced in an interview with a journalist from the Perth Daily News that Westralian Farmers was ready to relinquish its broadcasting interests. It was indicated that negotiations towards a sale to the licensee of 3LO Melbourne was well advanced, though differences of detail remained. Mann stated under parliamentary privilege that 6WF could not access the best artists for broadcast as they were controlled by the same interests it was now being compelled to merge with.

=== Australian Broadcasting Company era ===
In 1929 the Australian Government accepted the tender for the Australian Broadcasting Company to supply programmes for a three year period to the National Broadcasting System. On 2 September, moved from longwave to 690 kHz mediumwave.

It was announced by PMG Green in July 1931 that 6WF was to be relocated outside the Perth central business district and provided with a new transmission system. In September 1931, Professor Ross was provided with comprehensive technical details of the new 6WF transmission system by the PMGD and his own technical analysis supported its suitability. A site had not yet been determined by the PMGD, but was to be sited such that the field strength of the station would be sufficiently strong to be readily received in the CBD and override anticipated levels of man-made noise, while not so strong as to cause blanketing interference. The antenna was to be of the Alexanderson type, closely similar to those to be deployed at the new ABC stations 2CO Albury (Corowa) and 5CK Port Pirie (Crystal Brook). Transmitter power was to be 3 kW into the antenna, approximately double that of the original Westralian Farmers system. The transmitter was to be capable of 100% modulation and support audio frequencies in the range 50 Hz to 7 kHz. Night-time coverage would remain limited by self-fading. Ross' forecast of a December 1931 completion for the project proved optimistic. For commercial reasons, the site could not be identified prior to acquiring an option to purchase, but a November 1931 rumour that the station would be located on Wanneroo Road, north of Perth proved accurate. PMG Green confirmed in a late December statement that a 12-acre site had been acquired and the project now required approval at the 5 January 1932 cabinet meeting. The PMGD chief engineer John Murray Crawford visited Perth in February 1932 and gave a comprehensive progress report. Johns and Waygood Ltd. was the successful tenderer for the supply and construction of the two galvanised steel towers to support the antenna system. The construction commenced 2 April 1932 and was completed early May 1932.

=== Australian Broadcasting Commission era ===
The station moved again in 1937 to the Stirling Institute building located in the Supreme Court Gardens, St Georges Terrace. Despite the fact the building had been built 21 years earlier as a temporary structure it became the home of 6WF for the next 23 years.

In 1960 a specially built 23 studio building complex was completed at 191 Adelaide Terrace and the station moved there during that year. This building was to provide the home for the West Australian Symphony Orchestra for a number of years, running alongside three separate radio stations.

=== Australian Broadcasting Corporation era ===
These buildings lasted 45 years, until it was decided that new buildings were needed. A site was commissioned and the radio station moved to its new offices and studios in East Perth in March 2005.

The Adelaide Terrace site was sold to property developers in 2008 who have proposed demolishing the structure and erecting residential buildings. The transmission tower was demolished in January 2011.

=== Move to FM ===
On 23 February 2026, ABC Radio Perth began transmitting on 102.5 FM. The AM signal had long been plagued by poor reception in Perth's inner ring. Perth's dry, sandy terrain makes for poor ground conductivity. Programs were simulcast on both AM and FM for six weeks, until the AM transmitter was permanently shut down in late April.

The other two ABC stations broadcasting on AM in Perth – Radio National and NewsRadio – also started transmitting on FM on the same date. Due to a legislative requirement to broadcast parliament on AM, NewsRadio will continue to broadcast on both bands.

=== Technical staff ===
- Walter "Wally" Coxon (call sign 6AG) was a prominent wireless experimenter in Perth in the early 1920s, having been licensed since before World War One as XYK. He was appointed chief engineer of 6WF in late 1923 to design the Mulgaphone wireless receiver for marketing to Westralian Farmers' clients and build up an audience for the future 6WF operation. By late 1925 he was manager of the wireless department of Westralian Farmers (which included responsibility for oversight of 6WF). He continued in that role until the late 1920s, when he left 6WF (now owned by the Commonwealth Government) and was appointed chief engineer of the new commercial (then Class B) station at Northam.
- William "Bill" Phipps (call sign 6WP) was also a Perth wireless experimenter from the mid 1920s. He was appointed assistant engineer of 6WF in 1924 and remained in that role till the 1930s.
- George Bremner "Jock" Sutherland or Clyne (call sign 6GB) was another assistant engineer at 6WF during the late 1920s. He was a relatively recent arrival from Scotland who quickly established himself in the Perth wireless experimenting sphere. He regularly ran 6WF beyond its scheduled 10pm closing with his own selection of gramophone records.

== Programming ==
=== Historic ===
==== Staff ====
Harold Wells was the first chief (and initially, only) announcer at 6WF and stayed with the station until forced to retire by ill health in 1929. As the most frequently heard voice over Perth's only broadcasting station for five years, he became very well known. He died age 35 in 1938.

==== Operating hours ====
During initial planning for the station, consideration was being given to operating only a few days a week. In the week prior to commencement on 4 June 1924, the new broadcast facility played continuous gramophone music while equipment was adjusted in the entire transmission chain. The tests were sought out by a public starved of broadcast programming. Following commencement, the station immediately went to a seven days a week schedule, though only operating in the evenings from 7 pm to 10 pm. From 1 July 1924, 6WF commenced four daily sessions, commencing at 10 am, 12.30 pm, 3 pm and 7 pm.

==== Programming ====
Extension lectures by the University of Western Australia had been given at many locations throughout WA and were popular with the public. 17 of these lectures were broadcast over 6WF in 1924, with reception reported over distances of 300 to 400 miles. On the occasion of its first anniversary, it was noted that in the past year 6WF had conducted 900 transmissions, played 2,000 records and presented 200 lectures without failing to broadcast on a single day.

=== Current ===
==== News and current affairs ====
ABC Radio Perth produces news bulletins unique to Western Australia, which are broadcast between 5:00am and 10:00pm on weekdays, and between 6:00am and 1:00pm on weekends. National bulletins are broadcast outside these times.

The station also broadcasts national news magazine programs - AM, The World Today and PM.

=== Talk ===
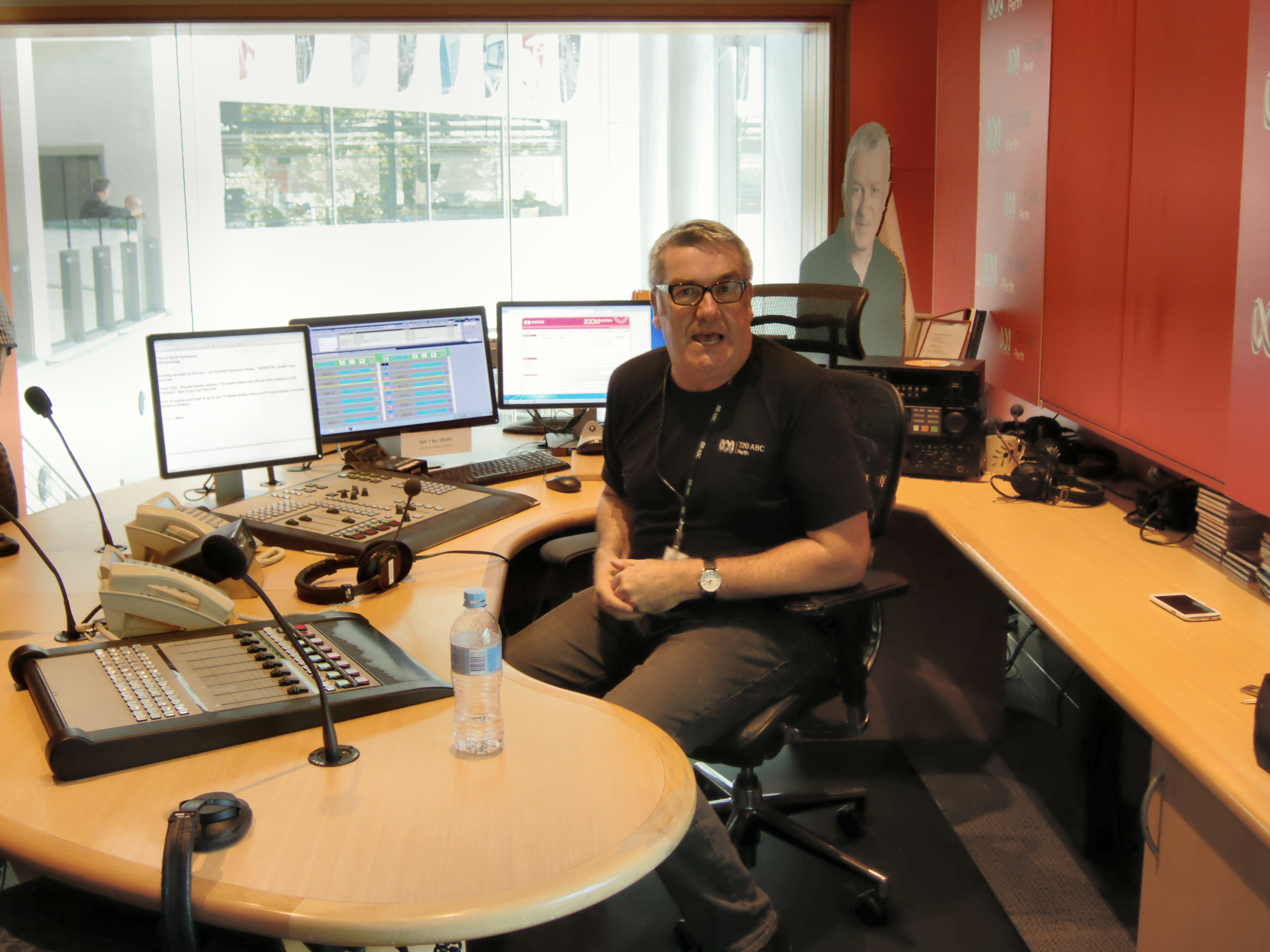
Geoff Hutchison, presenter of the Drive program, in the station's radio studio (The Wally Foreman Studio, Radio Studio 600)

Throughout the day and evening, ABC Radio Perth broadcasts a variety of talk shows. Breakfast on weekdays, presented by Eoin Cameron from 2002 until March 2016, has consistently been the highest rating breakfast program on Perth radio.

=== Sports ===
ABC Radio Perth broadcasts a range of sports coverage syndicated through the network under the name ABC Radio Grandstand, including Australian rules football and cricket.

The station is one of three that broadcast Australian Football League matches in Perth; the others are 6PR and Triple M Perth. The station also broadcasts West Australian Football League matches.

== See also ==
- ABW (TV station) – ABC television station located in the same building
