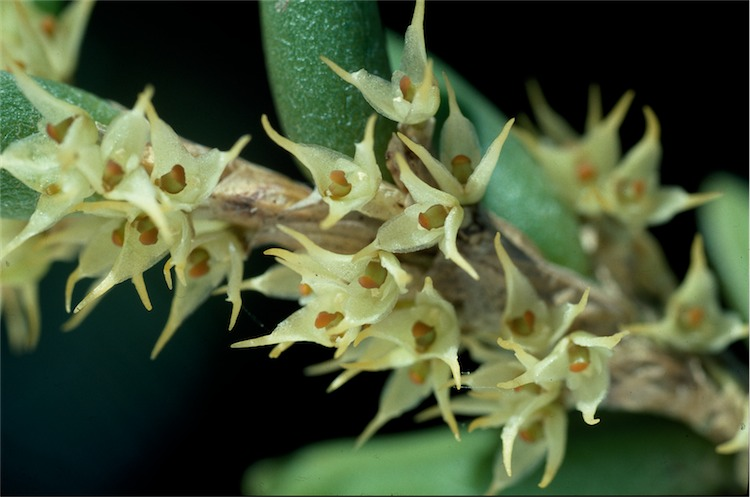
- Bulbophyllum wadsworthii

Scientific classification
- Kingdom: Plantae
- Clade: Tracheophytes
- Clade: Angiosperms
- Clade: Monocots
- Order: Asparagales
- Family: Orchidaceae
- Subfamily: Epidendroideae
- Genus: Bulbophyllum
- Section: Bulbophyllum sect. Oxysepala (Wight) Benth. & Hook. f. 1883

Type species
- Bulbophyllum clandestinum

Species
- See text

Synonyms
- Oxysepala Wight 1851; Bulbophyllum sect. Sphaeracron Schltr. 1912; Bulbophyllum sect. Oxysepalae Benth. & Hook. f. 1883

= Bulbophyllum sect. Oxysepala =

Section of flowering plants

Bulbophyllum sect. Oxysepala is a section of the genus Bulbophyllum.

== Description ==
Species in this section have pendulous rhizome and single flowers with thickened sepal tips.

== Distribution ==
Plants from this section are found from India to New Guinea and Australia.

== Species ==
Bulbophyllum section Oxysepala comprises the following species:

Image	Name	Distribution	Elevation (m)
	Bulbophyllum angusteovatum Seidenf. 1979	Thailand	
	Bulbophyllum belonaeglossum J.J.Verm. & A.L.Lamb 2008	Sabah Borneo	1,500 metres (4,900 ft)
	Bulbophyllum caldericola G.F.Walsh 1993	Australia (Queensland to New South Wales)	700 metres (2,300 ft)
	Bulbophyllum citrinilabre J.J.Sm. 1913	New Guinea and the Solomon Islands	300–600 metres (980–1,970 ft)
	Bulbophyllum clandestinum Lindl. 1841	Thailand, Laos, Vietnam, Myanmar, Malaysia, Sulawesi, the Moluccas, Sumatra, Borneo, New Guinea, Java, the Philippines and Fiji	1,000–1,200 metres (3,300–3,900 ft)
	Bulbophyllum colubrimodum Ames 1923	Philippines	600 metres (2,000 ft)
	Bulbophyllum crassulifolium (A. Cunn.) Rupp 1937	Australia (SE New South Wales to SE Queensland)	900–1,500 metres (3,000–4,900 ft)
	Bulbophyllum filicaule J.J.Sm. 1913	New Guinea	250–850 metres (820–2,790 ft)
	Bulbophyllum flavum Schltr. 1913	New Guinea	1,000 metres (3,300 ft)
	Bulbophyllum floribundum J.J.Sm. 1912	New Guinea	300 metres (980 ft)
	Bulbophyllum gadgarrense Rupp 1950	Australia (Queensland)	700 metres (2,300 ft)
	Bulbophyllum glandulosum Ames 1923	Philippines	1,000 metres (3,300 ft)
	Bulbophyllum grandimesense B.Gray & D.L.Jones 1989	Australia (Queensland)	600–800 metres (2,000–2,600 ft)
	Bulbophyllum heidelbergianum Jenny & R.Amsler 2020	New Guinea	
	Bulbophyllum hollandianum J.J.Sm. 1913	New Guinea	
	Bulbophyllum intermedium F.M.Bailey 1901	Australia (Queensland)	
	Bulbophyllum kauloense Schltr. 1913	New Guinea	300 metres (980 ft)
	Bulbophyllum korimense J.J.Sm. 1929	New Guinea, Solomon Islands	
	Bulbophyllum lamingtonense D.L.Jones 1993	Australia (Queensland, New South Wales)	800–1,200 metres (2,600–3,900 ft)
	Bulbophyllum leptoglossum J.J.Verm. & A.L.Lamb 2008	Sarawak Borneo	1,600–1,900 metres (5,200–6,200 ft)
	Bulbophyllum lewisense B. Gray & D.L. Jones 1989	Australia (Queensland)	1,000–1,250 metres (3,280–4,100 ft)
	Bulbophyllum muscohaerens J.J.Verm. & A.L.Lamb 1994	Sarawak and Sabah Borneo	1,800–2,000 metres (5,900–6,600 ft)
	Bulbophyllum piliferum J.J.Sm. 1908	Papua New Guinea	75–3,200 metres (246–10,499 ft)
	Bulbophyllum pseudofilicaule J.J.Sm. 1935	New Guinea	250 metres (820 ft)
	Bulbophyllum pungens Schltr. 1913	New Guinea	1,000–2,300 metres (3,300–7,500 ft)
	Bulbophyllum rhopalophorum Schltr. 1913	New Guinea	550–1,000 metres (1,800–3,280 ft)
	Bulbophyllum riparium J.J.Sm. 1929	New Guinea	1,600–2,000 metres (5,200–6,600 ft)
	Bulbophyllum schillerianum Rchb.f. 1860	Australia (Queensland)	100–1,250 metres (330–4,100 ft)
	Bulbophyllum semiteres Schltr. 1913	New Guinea	800 metres (2,600 ft)
	Bulbophyllum shepherdii F. Muell. 1862	Australia (Queensland and New South Wales)	5–1,000 metres (16–3,281 ft)
	Bulbophyllum sphaeracron Schltr. 1913	New Guinea	1,300 metres (4,300 ft)
	Bulbophyllum subtrilobatum Schltr. 1913	New Guinea	1,200 metres (3,900 ft)
	Bulbophyllum tenue Schltr. 1913	New Guinea	250 metres (820 ft)
	Bulbophyllum theioglossum Schltr. 1913	New Guinea	1,200 metres (3,900 ft)
	Bulbophyllum trichaete Schltr. 1913	Papua New Guinea	1,200–2,400 metres (3,900–7,900 ft)
	Bulbophyllum triclavigerum J.J.Sm.1913	New Guinea	1,900 metres (6,200 ft)
	Bulbophyllum wadsworthii Dockrill 1964	Australia (Queensland)	700–1,600 metres (2,300–5,200 ft)
	Bulbophyllum windsorense B.Gray & D.L.Jones 1989	Australia (Queensland)	1,000–1,600 metres (3,300–5,200 ft)
