= Four Corners (Australian TV program) =

Australian documentary television program

- Title card
- Genre: Documentary
- Presented by: Michael Charlton (1961); Gerald Lyons (1962–1963); Frank Bennett (1964); John Penlington (1964); Richard Oxenburgh (1964); Robert Moore (1964–1967); John Temple (1968); Mike Willesee (1969–1971); David Flatman (1971–1972); Caroline Jones (1973–1981); Andrew Olle (1985–1994); Liz Jackson (1995–1999, 2005–2010); Kerry O'Brien (2011–2015); Sarah Ferguson (2016–2018); Michael Brissenden (2019–present)
- Theme music composer: Rick Turk
- Country of origin: Australia
- Original language: English
- No. of seasons: 59

Production
- Producers: Bob Raymond (1961–1962); Allan Ashbolt (1963); Gerald Lyons (1963); John Power (1964); Robert Moore (1965–1967); Sam Lipski (1968); Allan Martin (1968–1972); Tony Ferguson (1973); Peter Reid (1973–1980); Brian Davies (1980–1981); Paul Lyneham (1980–1981); John Penlington (1980–1981); John Temple (1980–1981); Jonathan Holmes (1982–85); Peter Manning (1985–1988); Ian Macintosh (1989–1990); Marian Wilkinson (1991–92); Ian Carroll (1992–1995); Ian Allen (1994); Harry Bardwell (1995); Paul Williams (1995); John Budd (1995–1996); Bruce Belsham (1996–2007); Sally Neighbour (2015–2022); Matthew Carney (2022–2025); Joel Tozer (2026–present)
- Running time: 45 minutes

Original release
- Network: ABC TV
- Release: 19 August 1961 – present

Related
- Foreign Correspondent

Four Corners report on the 1998 Australian waterfront dispute, presented by David Hardaker

Four Corners is an Australian investigative journalism and current affairs documentary television program. Broadcast on ABC TV, it premiered on 19 August 1961 and is Australia's longest-running current affairs television program.

Originally a magazine program combining filmed reports and studio interviews, it developed a format centred on an extended report on a single subject. Its coverage includes politics, business and social issues in Australia and overseas. Investigations have contributed to public inquiries, including the Fitzgerald Inquiry into corruption in Queensland. The program has also been the subject of disputes over political bias and editorial standards.

Four Corners has received Walkley Awards, including the Gold Walkley, and Logie Awards. In 1992, it became the first television program inducted into the Logie Hall of Fame.

== History ==
Four Corners is based on the concept of British current affairs program Panorama. Its founding producer was Robert Raymond, and its first presenter was Michael Charlton. The first broadcast was at 8.30 pm on Saturday 19 August 1961, and the first 17 episodes were presented live. The original magazine format brought together several filmed stories and studio interviews in each edition.

Within weeks of its debut, the program reported on living conditions at the Box Ridge Aboriginal reserve near Casino, New South Wales. The report prompted public complaints and a specially convened meeting of the New South Wales cabinet. A 1963 report questioned the political neutrality of the Returned Services League, provoking further controversy.

During the 1980s, the program adopted a format concentrating on one subject per edition. Jonathan Holmes became executive producer in 1982, after a period in which the program's continuation had been in doubt. Its running time and broadcast slot changed during the decade; by the late 1980s it was a 45-minute program broadcast on Monday evenings.

The program celebrated its 60th anniversary in 2021. A retrospective edition was broadcast on 16 August, accompanied by an online collection of reports from the program's archive.

== Notable episodes ==
In sharp contrast to print media, television was the medium for critical accounts of Australia's role in the war in Vietnam. Four Corners, regardless of modest ratings, favoured the viewpoint of the antiwar and anti-conscription movements.

=== 1980s ===
In 1983, Four Corners aired allegations that then New South Wales Premier Neville Wran had tried to influence the magistracy over the dropping of fraud charges against Kevin Humphreys, charged with misappropriation of funds from the Balmain Leagues Club. Wran stood down and the Street Royal Commission, headed by the Chief Justice of NSW, Sir Laurence Street, was set up to inquire into this matter. Street found that the chief magistrate, Murray Farquhar, had used the Premier's name to get the Humphreys case dismissed, but exonerated Wran of any involvement. Farquhar was subsequently sent to prison.

Together with articles in The Courier-Mail, a 1987 Four Corners story entitled "The Moonlight State" reported on police corruption in Queensland. The subsequent Royal Commission, known as the Fitzgerald Inquiry, found systematic corruption in various levels of government and led to the jailing of police commissioner Terry Lewis, and the resignation and subsequent criminal trial of Premier Joh Bjelke-Petersen.

The program has investigated other cases of corruption in the New South Wales and Victorian police forces. Another report from 1985 helped to reveal that the French secret service had been responsible for the bombing of the Rainbow Warrior.

=== 2000s ===
A 2006 episode titled "Greenhouse Mafia" exposed the influence of the fossil fuel lobby on Australian climate change policy.

In March 2009, an episode titled "The Dishonouring of Marcus Einfeld" aired; it detailed the events leading up to the conviction and sentencing of an Australian former federal court judge, Marcus Einfeld. Einfeld was convicted on charges of perjury and perverting the course of justice over a speeding ticket.

"The Code of Silence", which aired 11 May 2009, was an investigative report on the attitudes towards and the treatment of women by National Rugby League players. The report focused primarily on two incidents involving NRL players and women who felt they had been exploited sexually. The mainstream media reported heavily on the subject for a number of weeks following the airing of "The Code of Silence".

The Four Corners website has also won multiple awards, including two Walkley Awards and three AIMIA Awards for its Broadband Editions of the programs, which include exclusive interviews, analysis and background information on selected programs.

=== 2010s ===
On 8 March 2010, a program was aired about the controversial Church of Scientology, with ex-members speaking about abuse and inhumane treatment such as coerced abortions and disconnection. The program was of note due to Church spokesperson Tommy Davis "categorically [denying]" all allegations put forward by ex-members. All interviews were conducted by Four Corners journalist Quentin McDermott, and aired the same week that a Parliamentary vote was held for an inquiry into the Church after South Australian senator Nick Xenophon brought Church abuse to light in November 2009.

On 30 May 2011, the program aired an exposé of cruelty inflicted on Australian cattle exported to Indonesian abattoirs. As a result, there was a public outcry about the practices and a petition launched by activist group GetUp! received more than 10,000 signatures overnight. This petition has received over 200,000 signatures. The next day, independent MP Andrew Wilkie and independent senator Nick Xenophon lobbied for an immediate ban on live export to Indonesia, which was backed by the Federal Minister for Agriculture, Joe Ludwig. There was an immediate ban on the abattoirs featured in the Four Corners program, followed by a six-month ban on all live trade to Indonesia.

In June 2014, Four Corners aired the episode Being Me, which followed a transgender child and presented the gender-affirming medical model as a positive and necessary pathway. The episode featured Dr Michelle Telfer, then director of adolescent medicine at the Royal Children's Hospital, as an advocate for gender transition in youth.

In February 2015, Four Corners uncovered widespread live baiting in the greyhound racing industry. The investigation revealed the use of live piglets, possums and rabbits to train racing greyhounds in three states. The revelation led to suspensions, resignations, inquiries and condemnation of the practice. The NSW Greyhound racing board was dismissed, and the Queensland Government dissolved all the Racing Queensland boards.

On 28 March 2016, Four Corners in an episode called "State of Fear: Murder and Money in Malaysia", aired allegations about large sums of money going into the bank accounts of Malaysian Prime Minister Najib Razak.

On 26 July 2016, Four Corners aired footage of systematic physical and verbal abuse of young Indigenous children and teenagers in the Northern Territory at Don Dale Youth Detention Centre. The episode caused outrage from the Australian public, prompting prime minister Malcolm Turnbull to announce a Royal Commission into the abuse occurring in the Northern Territory. The episode resulted in the NT Corrections Minister, John Elferink, being stood down from his position.

On 12 September 2016, Four Corners episode Rehab Inc. - The high price parents pay to get their kids off ice featuring Hader Clinic.

On 4 February 2019, Four Corners aired a report documenting the status of women's rights in Saudi Arabia. The episode included Rahaf Mohammed who eventually found asylum in Canada, Dina Ali Lasloom who was unsuccessful in her attempt to secure asylum in Australia, and activists Mona Eltahawy and Manal al-Sharif.

=== 2020s ===
On 16 March 2020, the program aired a report documenting allegations of war crimes, including execution of war prisoners, by members of Australia's Special Air Service Regiment deployed to Afghanistan.

On 9 November 2020, "Inside the Canberra Bubble", reported by Louise Milligan, examined allegations of sexism and inappropriate conduct in federal politics. Communications Minister Paul Fletcher subsequently asked the ABC board to explain the report's newsworthiness and impartiality. Its journalists defended the investigation as being in the public interest.

In 2021, ABC managing director David Anderson delayed a Four Corners story about the relationship between Prime Minister Scott Morrison and a supporter of QAnon. The report, "The Great Awakening", aired on 14 June 2021. Morrison denied any involvement in or support for QAnon.

The two-part report "Fox and the Big Lie", broadcast on 23 and 30 August 2021, examined Fox News and the 2020 United States presidential election. In December 2022, the Australian Communications and Media Authority found that the report breached the ABC's standards on accuracy, through two misleading omissions, and fair dealing with a participant. It found no breach of the impartiality standards. The ABC disputed the adverse findings.

On 14 March 2022, "State Control", reported by Anne Connolly, examined public trustee and guardianship systems, including fees charged to people whose finances were managed by state agencies and restrictions on their ability to make decisions. The Queensland government announced two investigations into its Public Trustee following the broadcast.

On 5 September 2022, "Flight Risk: The inside story of the chaos at Qantas", reported by Stephen Long, examined Qantas's cost cutting, outsourcing and industrial relations amid disruption as air travel recovered from COVID-19 restrictions. Current and former employees linked service problems to staffing reductions and raised safety concerns. Qantas said its safety standards had not been compromised and attributed operational problems to industry-wide labour shortages and staff illness. The Sydney Morning Herald business columnist Stephen Bartholomeusz criticised the report for insufficiently comparing Qantas with other airlines experiencing disruption.

On 19 February 2024, "Super Power: The cost of living with Coles and Woolworths", reported by Angus Grigg, examined supermarket pricing, competition and relations with suppliers. The chief executives of Coles and Woolworths denied price gouging. Woolworths chief executive Brad Banducci briefly left his interview before returning to complete it.

On 17 March 2025, "Betrayal of Trust: Australia's Childcare Crisis", reported by Adele Ferguson, examined allegations of abuse and neglect in childcare centres and failures in regulation. It won the 2025 Logie Award for Best News Coverage or Public Affairs Report.

== Awards ==
The program has won many awards for investigative journalism. By its 60th anniversary in 2021, it had received 62 Walkley Awards, including seven Gold Walkley awards, and 23 Logie Awards. In 1992, it became the first television program inducted into the Logie Hall of Fame.

Selected Gold Walkley awards for reporting broadcast on Four Corners
Year	Report or investigation	Recipients	Reference
2011	"A Bloody Business"	Sarah Ferguson, Michael Doyle and Anne Worthington	
2014	"Banking Bad" (with Fairfax Media)	Adele Ferguson, Deb Masters and Mario Christodoulou	
2015	"Making a Killing"	Caro Meldrum-Hanna, Sam Clark and Max Murch	
2020	"Killing Field"	Mark Willacy and the ABC Investigations–Four Corners team	
2022	"State Control"	Anne Connolly, Ali Russell and Stephanie Zillman	
2025	Childcare investigation (across Four Corners, 7.30 and ABC News online)	Adele Ferguson and Chris Gillett	

== Hosts ==
- Michael Charlton, 1961
- Mike Willesee, 1969–1971
- Caroline Jones, 1973–1981
- Andrew Olle, 1985–1994
- Liz Jackson, 1995–1999, 2005–2010
- Kerry O'Brien, 2011–2015
- Sarah Ferguson, 2016–2018
- Michael Brissenden, 2019–present

== Producers ==
- Robert Moore (1965–1967)
- Sam Lipski (1968)
- Paul Lyneham (1980–1981)
- Bruce Belsham (executive producer, 2002–2007)
- Sue Spencer (executive producer, 2007–2015)
- Sally Neighbour (executive producer, 2015–2022)
- Matthew Carney (executive producer, 2022–2025)
- Joel Tozer (executive producer, 2026–present)

== Controversies ==
=== Australian War Memorial report ===
On 17 September 2026, the Australian Communications and Media Authority (ACMA) published a finding that "Sacrifice", broadcast on 10 March 2025 about the redevelopment of the Australian War Memorial, breached the impartiality requirements of the ABC Code of Practice. ACMA found that the program's framing, presentation of audit findings and consultation processes, and selection and treatment of interviewees unduly favoured critics of the redevelopment. It found no accuracy breach concerning the use of "Last Post" audio alongside construction footage and sounds. The ABC rejected the impartiality finding, arguing that ACMA's interpretation imposed false balance on investigative reporting and failed to distinguish between explanatory interviews and interviews holding public officials to account.

=== Breaching of Source Confidentiality ===
Four Corners has on multiple occasions failed to protect their sources on a number of stories, which some claim are examples of a severe breach in journalism ethics and standards and an undermining of the principle of source protection, a fundamental principle and vital part of investigative journalism.

==== Disrupt Burrup Hub ====
In 2023, Four Corners produced a documentary on climate activist group Disrupt Burrup Hub, in which they followed the activists as they protested in front of Woodside Energy CEO Meg O'Neill's home. The documentary discussed the influence the Woodside Group has over Western Australian politics and the willingness of institutions to protect the group. The Western Australia Police Force approached Four Corners and requested all footage they had of the protesters. Despite initially refusing, and reassuring the public and activist group that they would not comply, Four Corners and the ABC did ultimately hand over the footage. In doing so, they provided information that could identify a number of activists involved in the protest, thus effectively giving the identify of their sources to the police. Disrupt Burrup Hub, in a press release, cited this as a massive breach in trust on behalf of the ABC, claiming that the ABC went back on the assurances they gave to a number of those involved, stating "...the ABC has breached explicit undertakings given to sources for the Four Corners story, several of whom only agreed to participate subject to a guarantee that they would not be identified and none of whom consented to have any footage provided to WA police."

=== Mahmood Fazal ===
One of their journalists, Mahmood Fazal, faced controversy over his conduct in 2026. The two episodes he presented were retracted in July.

==== FriendlyJordies ====
Kristo Langker, producer for independent journalist and YouTuber friendlyjordies reported to police that Fazal repeatedly informed him in January 2024 that he had been communicating with "very serious gang figures" who were threatening that "something bad is going to happen" if a video made by Shanks, "Coronation", was not deleted from YouTube. The video alleged links between the Alameddine crime network and the Coronation Property Group. In February 2024, Shanks subsequently removed the video from his channel, citing non-specific death threats as the reason.

In October 2025, Fazal was accused by a former business partner of relaying death threats from the Alameddine crime network to Shanks, which corresponded with the claims statements made by Shanks' producer in 2024. Fazal described the messages attributed to him as falsified and taken out of context.

Shanks shortly after reinforced the claims and further accused Four Corners and by extension the ABC of defending Fazal by refusing to view evidence offered to them in relation to Fazal's actions. The ABC stated their management were thoroughly investigating the matter. Fazal was subsequently fired by the ABC in 2026.

== See also ==
- List of longest-running Australian television series
- Panorama (similar British program broadcast on BBC One)
