= Pterostylis stricta =

Northern greenhood

Scientific classification
- Kingdom: Plantae
- Clade: Tracheophytes
- Clade: Angiosperms
- Clade: Monocots
- Order: Asparagales
- Family: Orchidaceae
- Subfamily: Orchidoideae
- Tribe: Cranichideae
- Genus: Pterostylis
- Species: P. stricta

Binomial name
- Pterostylis stricta Clemesha & B.Gray

Species of orchid

Pterostylis stricta, commonly known as the northern greenhood, is a species of orchid endemic to Queensland. It has a rosette of leaves and when flowering a single translucent white flower with green lines, a reddish-brown tip and a curved, protruding labellum.

== Description ==
Pterostylis stricta is a terrestrial, perennial, deciduous, herb with an underground tuber and a rosette of wrinkled leaves. Each leaf is 15–60 mm (0.6–2 in) long and 10–20 mm (0.4–0.8 in) wide. When flowering, there is a single white flower with green lines and a reddish-brown tip, 20–25 mm (0.8–1 in) long and 10–12 mm (0.4–0.5 in) wide which is borne on a flowering spike 100–300 mm (4–10 in) high. The dorsal sepal and petals are fused to form a hood or "galea" over the column, the dorsal sepal about the same length as the petals, all with a sharp point. There is a wide gap at each side of the flower between the petals and lateral sepals. The lateral sepals are erect with a tapering tip 12–15 mm (0.5–0.6 in) long and there is a broad, bulging sinus between them. The labellum is 14–16 mm (0.55–0.63 in) long, about 4 mm (0.2 in) wide, dark reddish-brown and curved, protruding above the sinus. Flowering occurs from March to July.

== Taxonomy and naming ==
Pterostylis stricta was first described in 1972 by Stephen Clemesha and Bruce Gray and the description was published in The Orchadian from a specimen collected near Ravenshoe. The specific epithet (stricta) is a Latin word meaning "draw together", "hold in check" or "bind".

== Distribution and habitat ==
The northern greenhood grows with grasses and in sheltered gullies in forest between Mount Finnigan and Paluma at altitudes of between 800 and 1,250 m (2,600 and 4,100 ft).
