= Pterostylis procera =

Short-lipped greenhood

Scientific classification
- Kingdom: Plantae
- Clade: Tracheophytes
- Clade: Angiosperms
- Clade: Monocots
- Order: Asparagales
- Family: Orchidaceae
- Subfamily: Orchidoideae
- Tribe: Cranichideae
- Genus: Pterostylis
- Species: P. procera

Binomial name
- Pterostylis procera D.L.Jones & M.A.Clem.

Species of orchid

Pterostylis procera, commonly known as the short-lipped greenhood, is a species of orchid endemic to Queensland. It has a rosette of leaves and when flowering a single translucent white flower with green and reddish markings and a labellum which does not protrude through the lateral sepals.

== Description ==
Pterostylis procera is a terrestrial, perennial, deciduous, herb with an underground tuber and a rosette of dark green, wrinkled leaves. Each leaf is 6–60 mm (0.2–2 in) long and 8–20 mm (0.3–0.8 in) wide. When flowering, there is a single translucent white flower with green and reddish markings, 40–50 mm (1.6–2.0 in) long and 18–25 mm (0.7–1 in) wide which is borne on a flowering spike 200–350 mm (8–10 in) high. The dorsal sepal and petals are fused to form a hood or "galea" over the column, the dorsal sepal slightly longer than the petals and sharply pointed. There is a wide gap at each side of the flower between the petals and lateral sepals. The lateral sepals are erect or turned backwards with a tapering tip 20–25 mm (0.8–1 in) long and there is a broad bulging sinus with a small notch between them. The labellum does not protrude above the sinus. Flowering occurs from February to May.

== Taxonomy and naming ==
Pterostylis procera was first described in 1989 by David Jones and Mark Clements and the description was published in Australian Orchid Research from a specimen collected near Herberton. The specific epithet (procera) is a Latin word meaning "tall", "slender" or "long".

== Distribution and habitat ==
The short-lipped greenhood grows with grasses and shrubs in sheltered gullies between Mount Finnigan and Paluma at altitudes above 700 m (2,300 ft).
