= Nick Olle =

Australian journalist

- Born: Nicholas Durrant Olle; 12 November 1974 (age 52)
- Education: Newington College; University of Sydney; University of Technology, Sydney
- Occupation: Television news producer
- Employer: SBS TV
- Television: Dateline

Nicholas Durrant Olle (born 12 November 1974) is an Australian journalist and since 2014 has been a producer with Dateline on SBS TV. He had produced programs for SBS's Insight before joining Dateline.

== Biography ==
Olle is the son of journalist Andrew Olle (1947–1995) and his wife Annette. He attended Newington College (1990–1995) where his grandfather, John Durrant Olle (1912–2003), had been a student in the 1920s. At university, Olle graduated in arts and law (Bachelor of Laws (Honours), University of Technology, Sydney; Bachelor of Arts, University of Sydney) and then worked as a lawyer. In 2001 he switched to a career in journalism. Since then he has worked in print, radio, television and online media. From 2005 until 2013 he lived and worked out of Argentina reporting South America news for the Australian Broadcasting Corporation and National Public Radio and other organisations. In 2009 he co-founded a Buenos Aires-based video journalism and production company that provides South American content for English, French and Spanish speaking markets. From 2012 he was The Global Mail's Latin America correspondent, filing multimedia stories on politics, social and environmental issues, human rights, technology and sport. In May 2013 Olle returned to Australia and worked as a reporter from the Sydney office of The Global Mail. The Mail was launched in February 2012 with philanthropic funding from his step-father Graeme Wood, the second husband of Annette Olle.
