= Andrew Olle =

Australian journalist (1947–1995)

- Born: John Andrew Durrant Olle; 28 December 1947; Hornsby, New South Wales
- Died: 12 December 1995 (aged 47); Royal North Shore Hospital, Sydney
- Years active: 1967–1995
- Spouse: Annette Longfield Olle née Marjason (m. 1969)
- Children: 3, including Nick Olle
- Presenting career
- Show: Four Corners
- Network: Australian Broadcasting Corporation
- Show: The 7.30 Report (New South Wales edition)
- Network: Australian Broadcasting Corporation
- Country: Australia

John Andrew Durrant Olle (28 December 1947 – 12 December 1995) was an Australian radio and television presenter who mostly worked for the Australian Broadcasting Corporation.

== Early and personal life ==
Olle was born in the Sydney suburb of Hornsby as the only child of Major John Durrant Olle, a radio telegraphist who had fought in World War II, and Marie Jose née Ifwersen, a New Zealand-born court reporter and stenographer with French and Danish heritage. His mother and father had married in February 1947, aged 21 and 36, respectively. His father rejoined the army in 1948 and, when Olle turned two, took the family to England while he was on army training. After three years they returned to Australia and lived in Darwin for a year, after which the marriage ended. His father, whose army career continued until 1960, received full custody of Olle and sent him to private boarding schools for his primary education: first Geelong Grammar Preparatory School then Ivanhoe Grammar School in Melbourne and Albury Grammar. During this time he spent alternating school holidays with each parent (his mother had moved to Sydney) and very occasional weekends with his father during school terms.

At age 12, after his father had left the army and married a woman with three sons, Olle moved into their home in Melbourne and attended the local government Mornington High School. Olle had previously been a good student at boarding school, seeking the approval of his parents, but became the "class ratbag" at his new school in a desperate attempt to fit in. He quit school aged fifteen, took odd jobs at an automotive spare parts shop and a Myer department store in Melbourne, and moved out of his father's home. He and a friend were arrested after committing a break and enter (Olle later recalled that "We broke a showcase window full of sunglasses, with no concept of what we would do next – and were caught redhanded by the police." He spent a day at a juvenile home and faced a children's court. During this period he was supported by a parole officer, later saying that "He showed me he cared about me, put his faith in me, trusted me, and I was responsive to it immediately because that puts the responsibility on you."

In December 1964 Olle moved to Brisbane to live with his mother and her stepfather, who secured him a place at Brisbane Grammar School, where he boarded for his final year. He received a Commonwealth Scholarship that allowed him to start an Arts-Law degree at the University of Queensland, but he dropped out after the first year.

He married Annette Longfield Olle (née Marjason), a nurse, at St Thomas' Anglican Church, Toowong on 24 April 1969 and the couple had two sons and a daughter: Nick, Sam, and Nina.

== Career ==
Olle began his career at the Australian Broadcasting Commission (ABC) in Brisbane as a cadet on 27 November 1967. He worked in Townsville from 1969 to 1970 before returning to Brisbane, where he mostly worked on the Queensland edition of the program This Day Tonight from 1971 to 1977 (with a stint in Melbourne from 1973 to 1974). He came to national attention in 1976 when he reported on a police raid of the Cedar Bay hippy commune, which won the award for "Outstanding Contribution to TV Journalism" at the Logie Awards of 1977. This report was part of a series about police corruption in the Joh Bjelke-Petersen state government.

He then moved to Sydney, where he worked on national programs for the ABC such as Four Corners (1977–78), Nationwide (1979–1980), and A Big Country (1981), before moving to the Nine Network where he worked on the newly established program Sunday from 1981 to 1985. He then returned to the ABC where he initially worked once again on Four Corners (from 1985 to 1994, winning a Penguin Award for Best Current Affairs Presenter in 1987, and anchored election coverage. In 1987 he began presenting a popular morning radio show on ABC Radio Sydney (then 2BL), where he was known for his conversations about politics with his friend Canberra correspondent Paul Lyneham in the form of a comedic double act with Olle playing the straight man. At the start of 1995 he switched from Four Corners, a weekly series mostly consisting of pre-recorded content, to the New South Wales edition of The 7.30 Report, a daily program consisting of live interviews, while still working on the morning radio show, therefore exposing himself to 15-hour working days. He began experiencing on-air memory lapses and later that year he was dismissed from his position at The 7.30 Report when it became a national program. His radio program was shifted from the morning to the late afternoon drive-time slot for the 1996 schedule, which he strongly preferred, though he died before this change was implemented.

== Illness, death, and legacy ==
On 7 December 1995, Olle collapsed in his Greenwich home due to a brain haemorrhage associated with a previously undiagnosed brain tumour (glioblastoma multiforme) and he was taken to Royal North Shore Hospital, where he underwent neurosurgery the next day. His life support was turned off on 11 December and at 5:17 pm local time (AEDT) that day, his radio station 2BL prematurely reported his death due to a pre-prepared statement about it mistakenly being faxed to the news room; the report was followed up by other broadcast media before being retracted by 6 pm. Olle died the next day on 12 December, aged 47. On 13 December, in the New South Wales State Parliament, the Premier of New South Wales Bob Carr, himself a former ABC journalist, moved a formal condolence motion on Olle's death. Olle was cremated at Northern Suburbs Crematorium where a private funeral service was held on 15 December and on 22 December, a nationally broadcast memorial service was held to a capacity crowd at Sydney Town Hall. For the memorial service Australian composer Peter Sculthorpe wrote a special arrangement for cello and piano of his 1947 work Parting, dedicated to Olle, which was played by Nathan Waks and Kathryn Selby.

The Andrew Olle Memorial Trust, which was established to raise money for brain cancer and neurosurgery research, The Andrew Olle Media Lecture, an annual lecture held by the ABC since 1996, and the Andrew Olle Scholarship, established in 1996 for ABC journalists aged under 25, were created in his honour. In 2018, he was posthumously inducted into the Australian Media Hall of Fame.
