= Hader Clinic =

Australian clinic

Hader Clinic is a private residential addiction and mental health treatment center based in Melbourne, Australia. Its primary residential programs are located in Geelong, Victoria, Bacchus Marsh, Victoria and Araluen, Queensland.

== Overview ==
The Hader Clinic treatment model is a modified therapeutic community with additional therapeutic features intended to treat all aspects of addiction and the individual, including their physical, psychological, emotional, social and spiritual well-being. The clinic also seeks to address the issues underlying the addiction.

In 2016, Hader Clinic was the subject of the ABC TV Four Corners episode Rehab Inc. - The high price parents pay to get their kids off ice.
