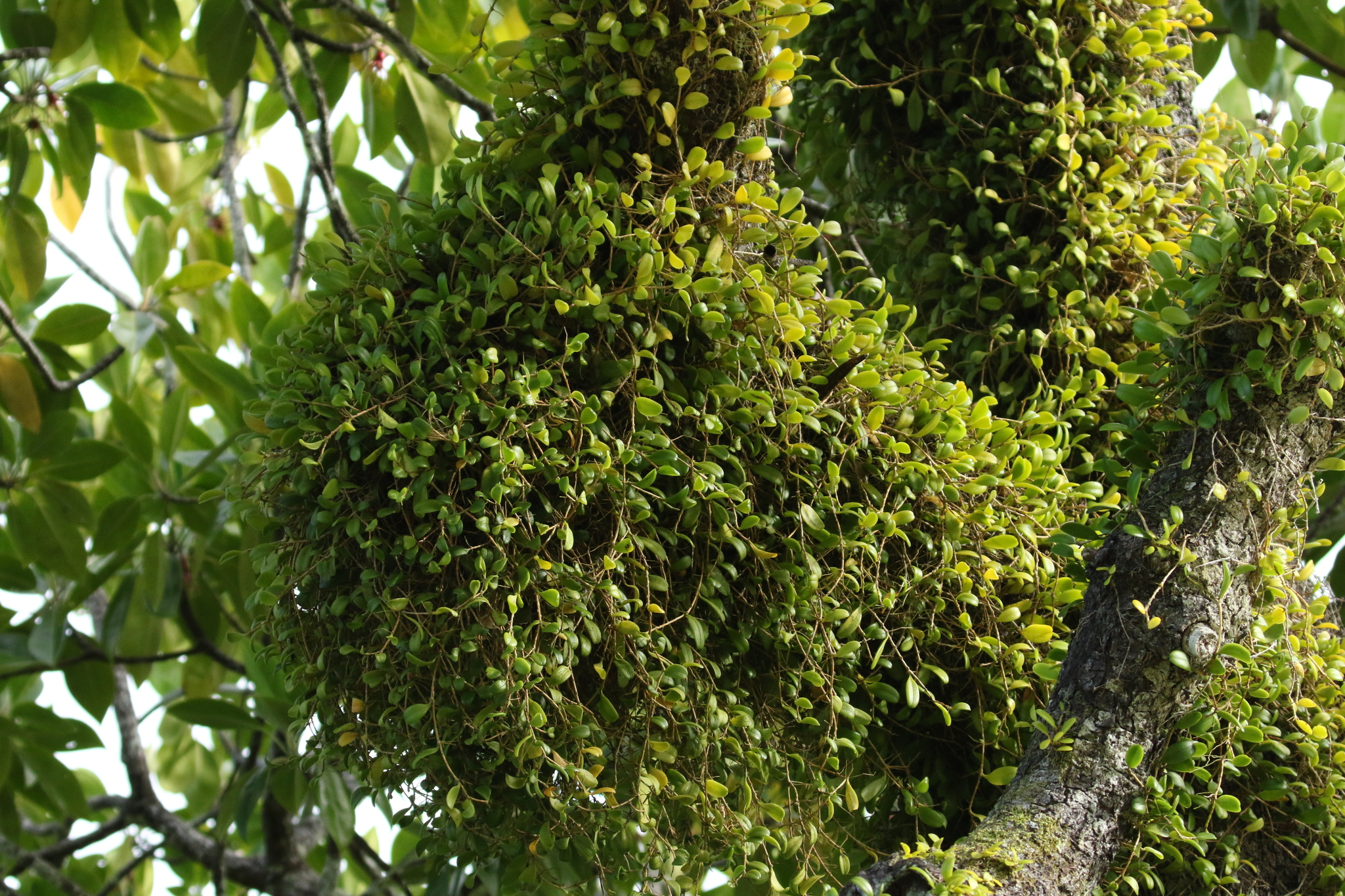

Scientific classification
- Kingdom: Plantae
- Clade: Tracheophytes
- Clade: Angiosperms
- Clade: Monocots
- Order: Asparagales
- Family: Orchidaceae
- Subfamily: Epidendroideae
- Genus: Bulbophyllum
- Species: B. clandestinum

Binomial name
- Bulbophyllum clandestinum Lindl.

= Bulbophyllum clandestinum =

Species of orchid

Bulbophyllum clandestinum is a species of orchid in the genus Bulbophyllum. This orchid grows long hanging rhizomes from which it produces tiny pseudobulbs that each bear one leaf. Flowers are born on each node, they are 3–5 cm in length and are a creamy colour. It is native to Borneo, Laos, Malaysia, Myanmar, Thailand, the Philippines, and Vietnam.
