= Bulbophyllum lamingtonense =

Cream rope orchid

Scientific classification
- Kingdom: Plantae
- Clade: Tracheophytes
- Clade: Angiosperms
- Clade: Monocots
- Order: Asparagales
- Family: Orchidaceae
- Subfamily: Epidendroideae
- Genus: Bulbophyllum
- Species: B. lamingtonense

Binomial name
- Bulbophyllum lamingtonense D.L.Jones

Synonyms
- Oxysepala lamingtonensis (D.L.Jones) D.L.Jones & M.A.Clem.

Species of orchid

Bulbophyllum lamingtonense, commonly known as the cream rope orchid, is a species of epiphytic or lithophytic orchid with well-spaced pseudobulbs and brown bracts arranged along the stems. Each pseudobulb has a single, fleshy, channelled leaf and a single cream-coloured or white flower with yellow tips. It grows on trees and rocks near cliffs and the edge of rainforest near the eastern border between New South Wales and Queensland.

== Description ==
Bulbophyllum lamingtonense is an epiphytic or lithophytic herb with stems 100–200 mm (4–8 in) long and covered with brown bracts. The pseudobulbs are 8–12 mm (0.31–0.47 in) long, about 3 mm (0.1 in) wide and spaced 15–25 mm (0.6–1 in) apart along the stems. Each pseudobulb has a thick, fleshy, narrow oblong to lance-shaped leaf 200–800 mm (8–30 in) long and 6–15 mm (0.24–0.59 in) wide with a channelled upper surface. A single cream-coloured or white flower 5.5–6.5 mm (0.22–0.26 in) long and 3–4 mm (0.12–0.16 in) wide is borne on a flowering stem 2–3 mm (0.08–0.1 in) long. The sepals and petals are fleshy, the sepals 5–7 mm (0.20–0.28 in) long, about 1.5 mm (0.06 in) wide and the petals about 2 mm (0.08 in) long and 1.5 mm (0.06 in) wide. The labellum is brown, about 2 mm (0.08 in) long and wide with a sharp bend near the middle. Flowering occurs from March to August.

== Taxonomy and naming ==
Bulbophyllum lamingtonense was first formally described in 1993 by David Jones who published the description in Phytologia from a specimen collected in the Lamington National Park. The specific epithet (lamingtonense) refers to the type location.

== Distribution and habitat ==
The cream rope orchid grows on trees and rocks near the edge of rainforest or on cliffs in the McPherson and Border Ranges.
