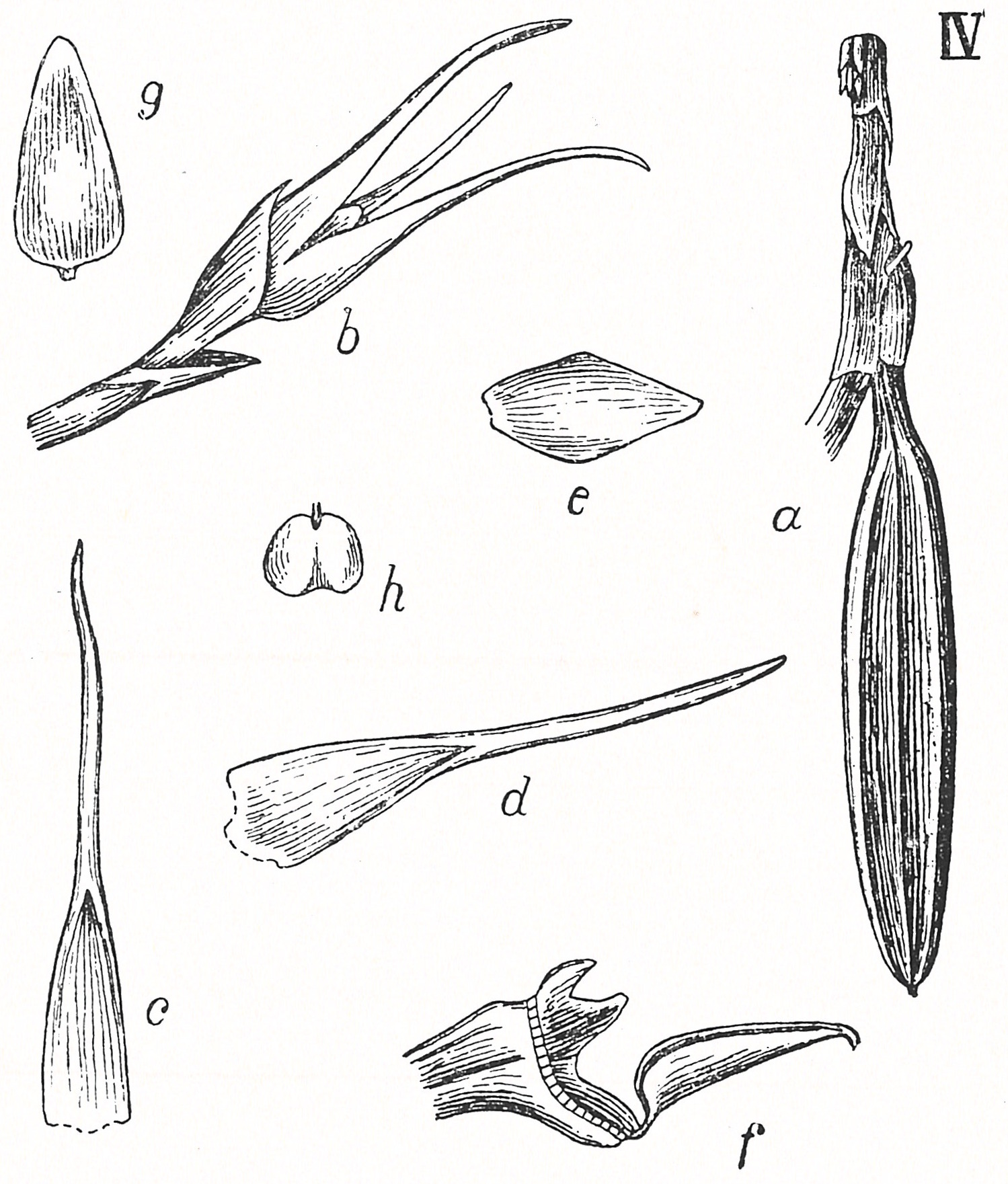

Scientific classification
- Kingdom: Plantae
- Clade: Tracheophytes
- Clade: Angiosperms
- Clade: Monocots
- Order: Asparagales
- Family: Orchidaceae
- Subfamily: Epidendroideae
- Genus: Bulbophyllum
- Species: B. pungens

Binomial name
- Bulbophyllum pungens Schltr.

= Bulbophyllum pungens =

Species of orchid

Bulbophyllum pungens is a species of orchid in the genus Bulbophyllum. Its petals are often blue-green.
