= Bulbophyllum muscohaerens =

Scientific classification
- Kingdom: Plantae
- Clade: Tracheophytes
- Clade: Angiosperms
- Clade: Monocots
- Order: Asparagales
- Family: Orchidaceae
- Subfamily: Epidendroideae
- Genus: Bulbophyllum
- Species: B. muscohaerens

Binomial name
- Bulbophyllum muscohaerens J. J. Verm. & A. L. Lamb

Species of orchid

Bulbophyllum muscohaerens is a species of orchid in the genus Bulbophyllum. It was found in Boneo (Sabah, Sarawak).

== Bibliography ==
- Wood, J.J., Beaman, T.E., Lamb, A., Lun, C.C. & Beaman, J.H. (2011). The Orchids of Mount Kinabalu 2: 1–726. Natural history publications (Borneo), Kota Kinabalu, Malaysia.
- Govaerts, R. (2003). World Checklist of Monocotyledons Database in ACCESS: 1–71827. The Board of Trustees of the Royal Botanic Gardens, Kew.
- Govaerts, R. (1996). World Checklist of Seed Plants 2(1, 2): 1–492. Continental Publishing, Deurne.
