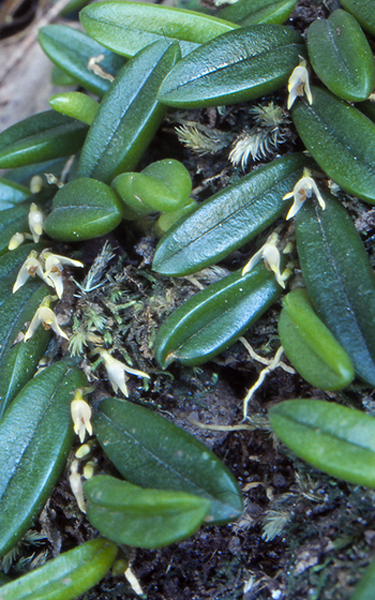
- In the Bomaderry Creek Reserve

Scientific classification
- Kingdom: Plantae
- Clade: Tracheophytes
- Clade: Angiosperms
- Clade: Monocots
- Order: Asparagales
- Family: Orchidaceae
- Subfamily: Epidendroideae
- Genus: Bulbophyllum
- Species: B. shepherdii

Binomial name
- Bulbophyllum shepherdii (F.Muell.) Rchb.f.

Synonyms
- List: Bolbophyllum sphepherdi Rchb.f. orth. var.; Bulbophyllum crassulaefolium Rupp orth. var.; Bulbophyllum crassulifolium (A.Cunn.) Rupp; Bulbophyllum intermedium F.M.Bailey; Bulbophyllum shepherdii Benth. nom. illeg.; Bulbophyllum shepherdii var. intermedium (F.M.Bailey) Nicholls; Bulbophyllum shepherdii (F.Muell.) Rchb.f.var. shepherdii; Dendrobium crassulaefolium A.Cunn. orth. var.; Dendrobium crassulifolium A.Cunn.; Dendrobium shepherdi F.Muell. orth. var.; Dendrobium shepherdii F.Muell.; Dendrobium shepherdii F.Muell. var. shepherdii; Oxysepala intermedia (F.M.Bailey) D.L.Jones & M.A.Clem.; Oxysepala shepherdii (F.Muell.) D.L.Jones & M.A.Clem.; Phyllorchis shepherdii Kuntze orth. var.; Phyllorkis shepherdii (F.Muell.) Kuntze

= Bulbophyllum shepherdii =

Wheat-leaf rope orchid

Species of orchid

Bulbophyllum shepherdii, commonly known as wheat-leaf rope orchid, is a species of epiphytic or lithophytic orchid that forms a dense mat of branching rhizomes pressed against the surface on which it grows. The pseudobulbs are well spaced along the rhizome, each with a single egg-shaped leaf and a single small, white or cream-coloured flower with yellow tips. It grows on trees and rocks in rainforest and is endemic to eastern Australia.

== Description ==
Bulbophyllum shepherdii is an epiphytic or lithophytic herb with branching rhizomes forming a dense mat on the substrate. The pseudobulbs are more or less spherical but flattened 2–3 mm (0.08–0.1 in) in diameter separated by 2–9 mm (0.08–0.4 in). Each pseudobulb has a grooved, stalkless, elliptic to egg-shaped leaf 20–40 mm (0.8–2 in) long and 6–8 mm (0.24–0.31 in) wide with a channelled upper surface. A single white or cream-coloured flower with yellow tips, 4–5 mm (0.16–0.20 in) long and 2–3 mm (0.079–0.12 in) wide is borne on a flowering stem 5–9 mm (0.2–0.4 in) long. The flowers do not open widely. The sepals and petals are fleshy, the sepals 4–5 mm (0.16–0.20 in) long, about 2 mm (0.08 in) wide and the petals about 2 mm (0.08 in) long and 1.5 mm (0.06 in) wide. The labellum is reddish brown, about 2 mm (0.08 in) long and 1 mm (0.04 in) wide with smooth edges and a sharp bend near the middle. Flowering occurs from March to August.

== Taxonomy and naming ==
Wheat-leaf rope orchid was first formally described in 1859 by Ferdinand von Mueller who published the description in Fragmenta phytographiae Australiae from a specimen collected by T.W. Shepherd. In 1870 Heinrich Gustav Reichenbach changed the name to Bulbophyllum shepherdii. The specific epithet (shepherdii) honours Thomas William Shepherd who collected the type specimen.

== Distribution and habitat ==
Bulbophyllum shepherdii grows on trees and rocks in rainforest and wet forest between Nambour in Queensland and Bega in New South Wales.
