= Paul Lyneham =

Australian journalist (1945–2000)

- Born: Rodney Paul Lyneham; 13 August 1945; Melbourne, Victoria, Australia
- Died: 24 November 2000 (aged 55); Canberra, Australian Capital Territory, Australia
- Education: Australian National University
- Occupation: Political journalist
- Years active: 1969–2000
- Notable credit(s): The 7.30 Report; 60 Minutes
- Spouse: Dorothy Horsfield
- Children: Chloe Lyneham; Joel Lyneham; Mathew Lyneham

Rodney Paul Lyneham (13 August 1945 – 24 November 2000) was an Australian newspaper journalist, commentator, and radio and television presenter.

== Early life and education ==
Rodney Paul Lyneham was born on 13 August 1945 in Melbourne, growing up there and in Canberra.

He graduated from the Australian National University.

During his time as a student he was the lead vocalist in the band The Bitter Lemons, which recorded the independently released single "Canberra Blues" in 1965.

== Career ==
Lyneham worked as a journalist at The Australian and The Canberra Times newspapers before joining the ABC in 1969 and spending a period of time as London, UK correspondent.

Lyneham joined commercial television, working for Channel Seven as a foreign correspondent including reporting on the Falklands War. After returning to Australia, while living in Canberra, Lyneham worked on Sydney radio station 2BL in a segment with his close friend Andrew Olle; they were a double act conversing about politics, with Lyneham playing the role of the funny man. He also reported for The 7.30 Report before joining Channel Nine and 60 Minutes.

== Personal life, death and legacy ==
While in London, Lyneham met the author Dorothy Horsfield, with whom he went on to have three children.

Lyneham died of lung cancer on 24 November 2000 in Canberra.

On 20 February 2002 Federal Treasurer Peter Costello launched the biography of Lyneham, Paul Lyneham – A Memoir, written by his widow Dorothy Horsfield, at the National Press Club, Canberra.

Annually since 2002, the National Press Club has awarded the Paul Lyneham Award for excellence in journalism, with only members of the federal parliamentary press gallery being eligible for the award. As of 2026, the award is known as Federal Parliamentary Press Gallery Journalist of the Year.
