= Ngalba Bulal National Park =

National park in Australia

- IUCN category II (national park)
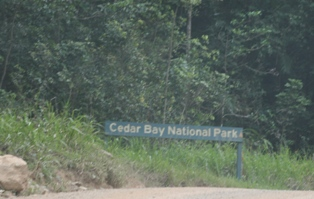
- Ngalba Bulal National Park

- Location within Queensland
- Location: Queensland
- Nearest city: Cooktown
- Coordinates: 15°46′37″S 145°20′47″E
- Established: 2011
- Governing body: Queensland Parks and Wildlife Service
- Website: https://parks.qld.gov.au/parks/ngalba-bulal

Ngalba Bulal is a national park in the Shire of Cook, Queensland, Australia. In 2015, Cedar Bay National Park became the Mangkalba (Cedar Bay) section of the Ngalba Bulal National Park.

== Geography ==
The park is 1,522 km (946 mi) northwest of Brisbane, 40 km (25 mi) south of Cooktown and accessible only by boat or foot. The park is one of the Wet Tropics World Heritage Area series of national parks, and is a gazetted World Heritage Site. It is also known as Mangkal-Mangkalba in the dialect of the local Aboriginal population, the Eastern Kuku Yalanji.

== History ==
The Cedar Bay area was developed in the 1870s for tin mining, and the remains of the tin work can still be seen in the area of Black Snake Rocks.

Cedar Bay gained a degree of notoriety in the 1970s when the Bjelke-Petersen government destroyed a hippie commune that had been present there since July 1972, when it was started by people who had unsuccessfully tried to set one up in Kuranda. The raid was controversial because of the immense cost ($50,000) and use of a helicopter, light aircraft and a Navy vessel to arrest 12 people on drug and vagrancy charges. At the Cedar Bay inquiry, police were accused of burning huts, smashing personal belongings, destroying clothing, chopping down fruit plantations and consuming alcohol at the site following the drug raid. Police, in their defence, tendered evidence of squalid living conditions and described the commune’s inhabitants as "filthy, criminal hippies". Andrew Olle's report on this incident for the ABC current affairs show This Day Tonight won the award for "Outstanding Contribution to TV Journalism" at the Logie Awards of 1977.

In 2007, the Cedar Bay National Park was part of the 2,000 square kilometres (770 sq mi) of land handed over to Cape York's Aboriginal population by the Queensland government. The handover came as a result of a 1994 native title claim.

Cedar Bay National Park was known as Mount Finnigan National Park before being enlarged.

== Activities ==
Birdwatching is a popular activity, with the most common birds including cassowaries, yellow-breasted sunbirds, double-eyed fig-parrots, mangrove kingfishers, beach stone-curlews and pied imperial-pigeons. Bush camping is permitted in the park, however fishing and collecting are prohibited. The sole walking track in the park was a former donkey track used by tin miners. It is inaccessible to all but fit walkers.

== See also ==
- Protected areas of Queensland
