= List of The Weekly with Charlie Pickering episodes =

The Weekly with Charlie Pickering is an Australian news satire series on the ABC. The series premiered on 22 April 2015, and Charlie Pickering as host with Tom Gleeson, Adam Briggs, Kitty Flanagan (2015–2018) in the cast, and Judith Lucy joined the series in 2019. The first season consisted of 20 episodes and concluded on 22 September 2015. The series was renewed for a second season on 18 September 2015, which premiered on 3 February 2016. The series was renewed for a third season with Adam Briggs joining the team and began airing from 1 February 2017. The fourth season premiered on 2 May 2018 at the later timeslot of 9:05pm to make room for the season return of Gruen at 8:30pm, and was signed on for 20 episodes.

Flanagan announced her departure from The Weekly With Charlie Pickering during the final episode of season four, but returned for The Yearly with Charlie Pickering special in December 2018.

In 2019, the series was renewed for a fifth season with Judith Lucy announced as a new addition to the cast as a "wellness expert".

The show was pre-recorded in front of an audience in ABC's Ripponlea studio on the same day of its airing from 2015 to 2017. In 2018, the fourth season episodes were pre-recorded in front of an audience at the ABC Southbank Centre studios. In 2020, the show was filmed without a live audience due to COVID-19 pandemic restrictions and comedian Luke McGregor joined the show as a regular contributor. Judith Lucy did not return in 2021 and Zoë Coombs Marr joined as a new cast member in season 7 with the running joke that she was fired from the show in episode one yet she kept returning to work for the show.

== Series overview ==
Series	Episodes	Originally released	
Series	Episodes	First released	Last released
1	20	22 April 2015	2 September 2015
2	14	3 February 2016	4 May 2016
3	20	1 February 2017	14 June 2017
4	20	2 May 2018	12 September 2018
5	14	20 March 2019	19 June 2019
6	14	29 April 2020	29 July 2020
7	16	3 February 2021	19 May 2021
8	12	27 April 2022	13 July 2022
9	19	8 February 2023	14 June 2023
10	14	7 February 2024	8 May 2024
11	12	12 March 2025	28 May 2025
12	15	14 January 2026	22 April 2026
Specials	10	16 December 2015	18 December 2024

== Episodes ==
=== Season 1 (2015) ===
No. overall	No. in season	Title	Featured guest	International correspondent	Original release date	Australia viewers (millions)
1	1	"Episode 1"	Sam Neill	(none)	22 April 2015	724,000
Topics: Star Wars trailer reactions; Tony Abbott skols a beer; Internet piracy in Australia; question time; Anzac Day (with Sam Neill); anti-vaccination religious exemptions; Australian Democrats lose party status.
2	2	"Episode 2"	Caitlin Stasey	(none)	29 April 2015	556,000
Topics: Australian doctor recruited by ISIS; Mayweather vs. Pacquiao; birth of a new royal baby and the royal family; Olympic Games host cities; gender equality (with Caitlin Stasey); selfies (with Kitty Flanagan); Belle Gibson lies about terminal cancer.
3	3	"Episode 3"	(none)	Tiffany Stevenson	6 May 2015	443,000
Topics: The birth of the royal baby; 2015 federal budget; upcoming executions of Andrew Chan and Myuran Sukumaran; foreign aid cuts; UK general election (with Tiffany Stevenson); opposition to a mosque in Bendigo.
4	4	"Episode 4"	Jeffrey Tambor	(none)	13 May 2015	570,000
Topics: Melbourne counter-terrorism raids; global warming; 2015 federal budget; Kim Jong-un and North Korea; coffee snobbery (with Kitty Flanagan); Transparent (with Jeffrey Tambor); Labor Games.
5	5	"Episode 5"	Nick Davies, Jacqui Lambie	(none)	20 May 2015	642,000
Topics: Bikie gang shooting in Waco, Texas; Bill Shorten's budget reply; old people; opposition to halal certifications; News of the World phone hacking scandal (with Nick Davies); aggressive interviews (with Jacqui Lambie).
6	6	"Episode 6"	Nick Xenophon, Todd Sampson	Loyiso Gola	27 May 2015	448,000
Topics: The Pope admits to not watching TV; female cricketers receive a payrise; Man Haron Monis inquest; marriage equality; Disney movie The Princess of North Sudan to be based on white American girl as African princess (with Loyiso Gola); Redesign My Brain (with Todd Sampson); Twitter (with Kitty Flanagan).
7	7	"Episode 7"	(none)	Loyiso Gola	3 June 2015	662,000
Topics: China builds artificial islands in the South China Sea; Taylor Swift makes Forbes most powerful women list; Bruce Jenner transitions into a woman; Adam Goodes' war dance; Indigenous incarceration; FIFA corruption (with Loyiso Gola); pornography and sex education (with Kitty Flanagan).
8	8	"Episode 8"	Derryn Hinch, Miranda Tapsell	Wyatt Cenac	10 June 2015	643,000
Topics: Alan Bond dies; 41st G7 summit; junk food advertising and obesity; Indigenous race relations in Australia (with Miranda Tapsell); Australians playing in the NBA (with Wyatt Cenac).
9	9	"Episode 9"	Alex Gibney	(none)	17 June 2015	500,000
Topics: Rachel Dolezal outed as white; housing affordability and Joe Hockey's comments; sports betting ads (and their sexism); allegations of the government paying people smugglers; self-help books (with Kitty Flanagan); 800th anniversary of Magna Carta; Scientology and Going Clear (with Alex Gibney).
10	10	"Episode 10"	John Edward, Amy Poehler	(none)	24 June 2015	647,000
Topics: Zaky Mallah's audience appearance on Q&A; Barack Obama says the word "nigger" on WTF with Marc Maron; Pope Francis's encyclical on climate change; road rage; Inside Out (with Amy Poehler); CNS funding; the underreaction to the Matildas winning Australia's first World Cup knockout match.
11	11	"Episode 11"	Lawrence Krauss	Wyatt Cenac	1 July 2015	608,000
Topics: Greek government-debt crisis; Melbourne prison riot; same-sex marriage becomes legalised in the US (with Wyatt Cenac); Uber; artificial intelligence (with Lawrence Krauss); proposed Rio Tinto coal mine near Bulga.
12	12	"Episode 12"	Richard Di Natale, Dylan Moran	(none)	8 July 2015	456,000
Topics: Nick Kyrgios tanking allegations; Bill Shorten's trade union Royal Commission appearance; the Sydney siege inquest; Generation Z; Joey Chestnut loses hot dog eating contest.
13	13	"Episode 13"	John Shelby Spong, Jennifer Byrne, Jason Steger	(none)	15 July 2015	620,000
Topics: Pluto mission; housing bubble; Bill Shorten's ALP ad campaign; sports stadium naming rights; Indonesia cuts Australian cattle imports; Shenhua mine approval; Go Set a Watchman book release.
14	14	"Episode 14"	Amy Schumer, Bill Hader, Mia Freedman	(none)	22 July 2015	675,000
Topics: Feliks Zemdegs wins Rubik's Cube championship; Mick Fanning shark attack; Bronwyn Bishop's helicopter trip; cars and cyclists; Trainwreck (with Amy Schumer); Uniqlo sex tape; women crying (with Kitty Flanagan).
15	15	"Episode 15"	Anthony Albanese, Bryan Stevenson	(none)	29 July 2015	527,000
Topics: John Sewel scandal; Adam Goodes booing; ALP conference; organ donation; Equal Justice Initiative (with Bryan Stevenson); resignations (with Kitty Flanagan).
16	16	"Episode 16"	Molly Carlile	(none)	5 August 2015	665,000
Topics: Parliamentary entitlements; cash for access; doping in sport; Cecil the lion; palliative care and death (with Molly Carlile); exercise gear (with Kitty Flanagan).
17	17	"Episode 17"	Bill Bryson, Lee Lin Chin, Miranda Tapsell, Angie Hart, Geraldine Quinn	(none)	12 August 2015	632,000
Topics: Coalition politicians denied conscience vote on marriage equality; the Seven Network takes the Nine Network to court over My Kitchen Rules rip-off; customer service (with Kitty Flanagan); rape prevention and blame; 'Hey Boy, Don't Rape' song (with Miranda Tapsell, Angie Hart and Geraldine Quinn).
18	18	"Episode 18"	Neil deGrasse Tyson, Larry Emdur	Loyiso Gola	19 August 2015	689,000
Topics: Paleolithic diet; Oscar Pistorius's early release from prison (with Loyiso Gola); Astrophysics (with Neil deGrasse Tyson).
19	19	"Episode 19"	Graeme Innes	Tiff Stevenson	26 August 2015	702,000
Topics: China's weakening economy crashes global stock market; Ashley Madison website hacked and data leaked; online relationship websites (with Kitty Flanagan); Australian Border Force secrecy laws prevent disclosure of reports on asylum seeker abuse in Australian detention centres; UK government's consumer protection laws for plastic surgery (with Tiff Stevenson); disability advocacy (with Graeme Innes); defensive architecture.
20	20	"Episode 20"	Hugh Jackman, Josh Frydenberg	(none)	2 September 2015	704,000
Topics: Dyson Heydon considers his future as Royal Commissioner in trade union investigations; Australian Border Force cancelled Operation Fortitude in Melbourne due to badly worded and unread press release; YouTube vlogs (with Kitty Flanagan); US presidential candidate Donald Trump; mental illness stigmatised when linking gun murders to mental illness; Pan (with Hugh Jackman); NASA simulates Mars Mission on Earth.

=== Season 2 (2016) ===
No. overall	No. in season	Title	Featured guest	International correspondent	Original release date	Australia viewers (millions)
22	1	"Episode 1"	Ben Stiller	(none)	3 February 2016	577,000
Topics: Ted Cruz Iowa caucus victory; Ignorance Awareness Week; Sports Corruption; Vaping (with Kitty Flanagan); Mitchell Pearce Australia Day scandal.
23	2	"Episode 2"	Samuel Johnson, Ice Cube, Kevin Hart	(none)	10 February 2016	517,000
Topics: Cardinal Pell's absence from the Royal Commission into Institutional Responses to Child Sexual Abuse; children refugees in Nauru; sexual inequality in movie merchandise and genderised toys; packaged lettuce.
24	3	"Episode 3"	Emma Ayres	(none)	17 February 2016	545,000
Topics: Kristin Davis' appearance on Sunrise; Beyoncé's Super Bowl performance; political donations; stress amongst year twelve students.
25	4	"Episode 4"	Andrew Denton	(none)	24 February 2016	529,000
Topics: Liberal Party senator Cory Bernardi opposes Safe Schools anti-bullying programme in schools; Labor leader Bill Shorten proposes negative gearing law reforms; body dysmorphia and use of dietary supplements; voluntary assisted dying (with Andrew Denton); ISIS name causes confusion and negative connotations; Donald Trump responds to Pope Francis's comment regarding building walls instead of bridges makes Trump Un-Christian; Sydney's early alcohol lockout laws.
26	5	"Episode 5"	Masha Gessen, Michelle Bridges	Loyiso Gola	2 March 2016	481,000
Topics: Oscars (host Chris Rock's address regarding lack of diversity in nominations as well as Mad Max: Fury Road's six wins); Coalition senators oppose Safe Schools anti-bullying of LGBTIQ children programme in schools; marriage equality plebiscite; acts of terrorism (with Masha Gessen); shark attacks and shark culling; Zimbabwe's president Robert Mugabe celebrates his 92nd birthday (with Loyiso Gola).
27	6	"Episode 6"	Alan Alda	(none)	9 March 2016	600,000
Topics: Affair allegations between Peta Credlin and Tony Abbott in Niki Savva's book Road To Ruin: How Tony Abbott and Peta Credlin Destroyed Their Own Government; political preselection process; technology making parenting easier (with Kitty Flanagan); Godwin's Law invoked as Donald Trump is compared to Adolf Hitler; Rupert Murdoch and Jerry Hall get married.
28	7	"Episode 7"	Luke McGregor, Peter FitzSimons	Adam Briggs	16 March 2016	532,000
Topics: Russia withdraws from Syria; ISIS leak; Shane Warne Foundation closure; phone dependence; flushable wipes (with Kitty Flanagan); referendum on changes to the Australian Constitution to give Aboriginals constitutional recognition (with Adam Briggs).
29	8	"Episode 8"	Melissa McCarthy, Ben Falcone, Tanya Plibersek	(none)	23 March 2016	558,000
Topics: Brussels terrorist attacks; possible double dissolution election; 2016 World Happiness Report; television advertisement and product placement; Hulk Hogan sex tape law suit.
30	9	"Episode 9"	Sara Pascoe, Wyatt Roy, True Australian Patriots (Anne Edmonds, Damien Power and Greg Larsen)	Chloe Hilliard	30 March 2016	594,000
Topics: Egyptian man hijacks EgyptAir plane over domestic dispute with his wife; Australia's refusal to establish permanent maritime boundaries with East Timor has short-changed East Timor of royalties worth billions of dollars raised from oil and gas resources found in the Timor Sea; U.S. Democratic presidential candidate Bernie Sanders wins Hawaii, Alaska and Washington state caucuses (with Chloe Hilliard); the Australian Government's $6 million taxpayer funded fictional film The Journey which aims to stop asylum seekers heading to Australia by boat has been released in Afghanistan, Iran, Iraq and Pakistan; Football (with Kitty Flanagan); Ugandan journalist Elijah Turyagumanawe continues broadcasting as he and other journalists are arrested and detained by Ugandan police.
31	10	"Episode 10"	Dylan Alcott	Adam Briggs	6 April 2016	590,000
Topics: Panama papers; 2016 Gold Logie nominees; wrongful convictions; Australia discovered or invaded (with Adam Briggs); 2018 Commonwealth Games mascot.
32	11	"Episode 11"	Andrew Bolt	(none)	13 April 2016	560,000
Topics: 60 Minutes detainment in Beirut, Lebanon; data brokers; traffic congestion; the closure of Clive Palmer's Queensland Nickel the result of fund misuse.
33	12	"Episode 12"	Nalini Joshi	(none)	20 April 2016	558,000
Topics: Early election; Grant Hackett's assault of a man on an airplane; Johnny Depp and Amber Heard's court case for dog smuggling; concerns regarding the upcoming 2016 Rio Olympics; Donald Trump's presidential campaign.
34	13	"Episode 13"	Francesca Stavrakopoulou, Kevin Rudd	(none)	27 April 2016	618,000
Topics: Passing of Prince; Donald Trump's Presidential race; 60 Minutes crew's release from detainment and the aftermath; the Internet (with Kitty Flanagan).
35	14	"Episode 14"	Bill Shorten, Eric Bana	(none)	4 May 2016	656,000
Topics: 2016 Australian federal budget; 11 year old American boy Chris Gaither shoots an intruder; federal government funding cuts to CSIRO shifts focus from research for public good to commercial purposes; Special Correspondents (with Eric Bana); Climate change.

=== Season 3 (2017) ===
No. overall	No. in season	Title	Featured guest	International correspondent	Original release date	Australia viewers (millions)
37	1	"Episode 1"	George Miller	(none)	1 February 2017	586,000
Topics: Donald Trump signs an executive order to enact the 90-day Immigration Ban on Muslims from Syria, Iran, Iraq, Libya, Somalia, Sudan and Yemen and an indefinite suspension of all Syrian refugees; Australia-US refugee deal becomes uncertain under Trump's Immigration Ban on Muslims; Australia Day date change (with Adam Briggs); Macquarie Dictionary names "fake news" as its Word of the Year; One Nation's Western Australian candidate David Archibald calls for the single parents support payment to be scrapped claiming single motherhood would lead to lazy and ugly people; the ABC ends its shortwave transmission service in the Northern Territory and to international audiences from 31 January 2017; Tropfest's 25th Anniversary (with George Miller); The Pub Test (with Kitty Flanagan).
38	2	"Episode 2"	Erin Phillips, George Christensen	(none)	8 February 2017	492,000
Topics: Cory Bernardi leaves the Liberal Party to form his own political party called the Australian Conservatives; a sinkhole has opened near Malcolm Turnbull's Sydney harbourside mansion; Derryn Hinch's Justice Party; Queen Elizabeth II celebrates her Sapphire jubilee; Pamela Anderson rumoured to be romantically linked to Julian Assange; Earthing movement and products as a pseudoscience (with Kitty Flanagan); Australia follows European countries responding to Donald Trump's "America First" slogan in his inauguration speech by releasing satirical videos mimicking Trump's voice and speech patterns in a bid for second place.
39	3	"Episode 3"	Matt Damon	(none)	15 February 2017	580,000
Topics: US President Trump fired national security advisor Michael Flynn for discussing US sanctions with a Russian official then misled Vice President Mike Pence about those conversations; Jacqui Lambie introduced a bill to ban the burqa for national security and public safety reasons; homelessness increases as public housing crisis worsens; the High Court ruled Rod Culleton was never eligible to be elected to the Senate and the Federal Court has declared he was bankrupt; Prime Minister Malcolm Turnbull blames renewable energy for South Australia's power outages despite emails citing the state's extreme storms were the cause; cartoonist Larry Pickering claimed his anti-Muslim and homophobic comments at a Q Society event were just jokes.
40	4	"Episode 4"	Hugo Weaving, Sunny Munn, Chrissie Swan	(none)	22 February 2017	518,000
Topics: Kim Jong-un's half brother Kim Jong-nam was reportedly assassinated in Malaysia; Sutton United's goalkeeper Wayne Shaw was forced to resign after eating a pie in a betting stunt during the match between Sutton United and Arsenal which led to an investigation by the Gambling Commission and The Football Association; Benjamin Netanyahu and his wife Sara arrived in Sydney for a 4-day visit to Australia; Malcolm Turnbull arrived in New Zealand last week to meet with Bill English for the annual leaders' meeting in Queenstown; the Coalition wants to avoid another Mediscare campaign by making it a criminal offence to impersonate or purport to act on behalf of a Commonwealth officer or entity and to use Commonwealth logos without permission to mislead the public; Jasper Jones (with Hugo Weaving).
41	5	"Episode 5"	Simon Sinek, Sarah Hanson-Young	(none)	1 March 2017	522,000
Topics: La La Land was announced as the 89th Academy Awards Best Picture winner until the acceptance speech was interrupted to announce that Moonlight actually won; Malcolm Turnbull blamed Tony Abbott's outburst last week for poor polling by Newspoll which showed the Coalition trailing Labor 55-45 in two-party preferences; a US research study in the Archives of Sexual Behavior show Millennials are having less sex than Generation X did at the same age (with Kitty Flanagan); Philippine's recently elected president Rodrigo Duterte gained an approval rating of 86 percent after introducing controversial and tough laws for drug criminals and the war on drugs.
42	6	"Episode 6"	Carmel Johnston, Kerri-Anne Kennerley	(none)	8 March 2017	480,000
Topics: Trump accused Barack Obama of wiretapping Trump Tower during the 2016 election without providing evidence and Trump requested Congress to launch an investigation a day later; the Coalition proposed reforming section 18C of the Racial Discrimination Act by introducing a reasonable person test where a member of the community judges whether or not the racist behaviour breaches the standards of ordinary Australians; the AANA amended its Advertiser Code of Ethics to require social influencers to be more transparent about sponsored posts and commercial connections on social media; short history of NBN Co (with Adam Briggs); NASA completes year-long Mars simulation in Hawaii (with Carmel Johnston).
43	7	"Episode 7"	Justin Hamilton, Trey Parker, Matt Stone	Jonathan Pie	15 March 2017	526,000
Topics: Coopers Brewery apologised for the beer promotional video released by the Bible Society about same-sex marriage then cancelled their limited edition light beer associated with the Bible Society (with Justin Hamilton); Wikileaks released data to the internet about CIA's hacking tools that exploit iPhones, Android phones, Windows computers and Samsung televisions to spy and listen in on conversations; Tony Blair was invited to the unveiling of a new UK war memorial honouring Britons who fought in the Afghanistan and Iraq wars while families of war heroes were not invited (with Jonathan Pie); Labor wins the Western Australian state election by a landslide with Mark McGowan becoming the state's new Premier; The Book of Mormon (with Matt Stone and Trey Parker).
44	8	"Episode 8"	Brian Greene, Grant Denyer	(none)	22 March 2017	505,000
Topics: Queenslander Lee de Paauw ended up in hospital after a drunken attempt to impress British backpacker Sophie Paterson by jumping into a crocodile infested river and fought off a saltwater crocodile; Prince William was caught on camera dancing daggy dad moves in a Swiss nightclub; String theory and physics (with Brian Greene); a short history of the Australian Grand Prix (with Francis Leach, Dr. Karl Kruszelnicki, Raoul Mulder and economist Rod Campbell).
45	9	"Episode 9"	Sarah Wilson, Bob Odenkirk	Loyiso Gola	29 March 2017	511,000
Topics: the Coalition's 10 year tax plan to cut company tax rates to 25 percent for all businesses has passed the Lower House; Trump abandoned his election promise to overhaul Obamacare after he failed to gain support from members of his own political party; Durban will no longer host the 2022 Commonwealth Games due to financial constraints and failure to meet deadlines (with Loyiso Gola); Better Call Saul (with Bob Odenkirk); news media reported that Prince William narrowly avoided a helicopter crash despite Prince William not being onboard the helicopter at the time of the incident; eavesdropping phones (with Kitty Flanagan).
46	10	"Episode 10"	Maurice Gleeson, Sophie Monk	(none)	5 April 2017	N/A
Topics: Sky News Australia fired Mark Latham after he made a series of offensive comments during broadcasts; Malcolm Turnbull caused an uproar after he refused a sausage in bread from a volunteer while visiting flood victims in Lismore, New South Wales; the latest polls from Fairfax-Ipsos and Newspoll showed support for the Coalition continued to drop; making sports accessible for the visually impaired (with Maurice Gleeson).
47	11	"Episode 11"	Dave Hughes	(none)	12 April 2017	543,000
Topics: Trump launched a military missile attack on a Syrian airfield; aspiring rapper Terry Peck consumed a meal worth $620 at a Gold Coast restaurant and fled without paying before he was captured by police; Herd immunity (with Kitty Flanagan); drugs at music festivals (with Adam Briggs).
48	12	"Episode 12"	Judith Lucy, Denise Scott, Chris Judd, Sam Neill	(none)	19 April 2017	593,000
Topics: North Korea threatens nuclear war against USA; ABC's music video programme Rage celebrates 30 years; Perth Glory's goalkeeper Liam Reddy committed a blunder which enabled Melbourne City's Nick Fitzgerald to score an open goal; Super bugs (with Kitty Flanagan); The Weekly celebrates 2 years since its first episode (with Sam Neill).
49	13	"Episode 13"	Paola Magni, James Blunt	Andy Zaltzman	26 April 2017	525,000
Topics: The Coalition announced a new Australian citizenship test based on Australian values; global March for Science protests called for action against Trump's dismissal of climate science and his calls for large cuts to scientific research; a 3-month old baby was refused a US visa and summoned to the US Embassy in London for an interview after his grandfather made an error on a visa waiver form; using forensic entomology to solve crimes (with Paola Magni); Elections in France (with Andy Zaltzman).
50	14	"Episode 14"	Geoffrey Rush	Mel Buttle	3 May 2017	545,000
Topics: Cassandra Sainsbury was arrested at El Dorado International Airport in Bogotá, Colombia after 5.8 kilograms of cocaine was found in her luggage; Murdoch media accused the ABC of being out of touch with ordinary Australians (with Mel Buttle); Pirates of the Caribbean: Dead Men Tell No Tales (with Geoffrey Rush); Trump's first 100 days in office as President of the United States; Decluttering (with Kitty Flanagan).
51	15	"Episode 15"	Emma Watkins	Adam Briggs	10 May 2017	608,000
Topics: Scott Morrison delivered the 2017 Australian federal budget; Sam Dastyari released a video on social media titled '$1 million in Sydney' in a bid to address the housing affordability crisis; news broke on a Royal Announcement causing confusion regarding Prince Philip's health which turned out to be an announcement of his retirement from public activities; Emmanuel Macron defeated far-right rival Marine Le Pen to become president after winning the French elections; being the first female Wiggle (with Emma Watkins); the Coalition bans gambling advertising during live daytime television sports events; Bill Shorten's 'Employ Australians First' TV advertisement was criticised for lack of ethnic diversity (with Adam Briggs).
52	16	"Episode 16"	Lawrence M. Krauss, DeAnne Smith	(none)	17 May 2017	592,000
Topics: Global WannaCry ransomware attack; US media reported that Trump had put national security at risk when he revealed highly classified information to a Russian foreign minister and ambassador; rumours emerge that Mark Zuckerberg has aspirations of running for US president; scientists may have found a cure for baldness by accident while studying cancer tumours; Theoretical physics (with Lawrence M. Krauss); understanding LGBTIQ (with DeAnne Smith); Fidget spinner (with Kitty Flanagan).
53	17	"Episode 17"	Lisa Wilkinson	(none)	24 May 2017	587,000
Topics: 60 Minutes and Sunday Night compete for ratings with reports of Cassandra Sainsbury's drug bust and detention in Colombia; Blocky the Block of Cash competition mascot on The Today Show; Lisa Wilkinson celebrated 10 years as host of The Today Show; the Turkish president Recep Tayyip Erdoğan's bodyguards injured protesters in a brawl outside the Turkish ambassador's residence during a visit to Washington.
54	18	"Episode 18"	Turia Pitt, Sam Dastyari	(none)	31 May 2017	456,000
Topics: Trump tweets the word covfefe instead of the word coverage on Twitter; Schapelle Corby returned to Australia after 12 years in an Indonesian prison; Cardinal George Pell could still be charged with child sex abuse offences dating back to the late 1970s; Unmasked by Turia Pitt with Bryce Corbett (with Turia Pitt); Margaret Court declared she will no longer fly with Qantas because the airline's CEO Alan Joyce supports Same-sex marriage.
55	19	"Episode 19"	Mona Chalabi, Steve Price	Jonathan Pie	7 June 2017	582,000
Topics: Boris Johnson calls Jeremy Corbyn a 'mugwump'; UK election (with Jonathan Pie); a study has found that Airbnb has an adverse impact on Australia's housing affordability and rental market by listing more properties once available to local long-term renters and raising the prices for rental accommodation; data journalism and analysis (with Mona Chalabi); Panda pornography (with Kitty Flanagan).
56	20	"Episode 20"	Abdul Abdullah, The Veronicas, Julia Zemiro	Andy Zaltzman, Loyiso Gola	14 June 2017	634,000
Topics: The 2017 UK election resulted in a hung parliament forcing incumbent Prime Minister Theresa May to form a coalition with the Democratic Unionist Party (with Andy Zaltzman); the Saint Petersburg Stadium (with Loyiso Gola); understanding experiences of young Muslims in the contemporary multicultural Australian context through art (with Abdul Abdullah).

=== Season 4 (2018) ===
No. overall	No. in season	Title	Featured guest	Hard Chat	International correspondent	Original release date	Australia viewers (millions)
58	1	"Episode 1"	Celia Pacquola	Em Rusciano	(none)	2 May 2018	583,000
Topics: Bank regulator APRA forces the Commonwealth Bank to put aside $1billion to cover multiple regulatory breaches; Cardinal George Pell ordered to stand trial in Australia for historic child sex abuse; ALP promises to ban 10 percent tax on tampons; former AFL player and coach Mark Thompson was arrested and charged for drug trafficking and possession; North and South Korean leaders reportedly met in the Demilitarised Zone on the border of the two countries to discuss the possible summit with Trump; education reform with Gonski 2.0; Artificial intelligence (with Kitty Flanagan).
59	2	"Episode 2"	Laurie Oakes, Richard Dawkins, Sammy J, Randy Feltface, Dave Hughes, Holly Ife, Brendan Fevola, Alex Fevola, Denise Scott, John Lane	Nick Giannopoulos	(none)	9 May 2018	550,000
Topics: The Coalition cuts $84 million from the ABC in the 2018 federal budget; Western Australian MP Barry Urban resigned after a committee's report found that he lied about his education and work history; 104 year old Australian scientist and euthanasia advocate David Goodall flies to Switzerland to be euthanased; Trump withdraws the US from the Iran Nuclear Deal; Holmdel Township Police Department in New Jersey have caught the serial pooper who was defecating at Holmdel High School; former prime minister John Howard joined leading business figures in calling for Newstart payments to be increased after the 2018 federal budget delivered no extra benefits to the unemployed and clamped down further on welfare recipients; unions and businesses unite to call on the federal government to maintain current migration levels.
60	3	"Episode 3"	Bill Shorten	Amanda Keller	Adam Briggs, Jonathan Pie	16 May 2018	673,000
Topics: The father of Meghan Markle, Thomas Markle, will no longer be attending the Royal Wedding due to chest pains; Jessica Mauboy received harsh criticism for placing 20th out of 26 at the 2018 Eurovision Song Contest; Israeli forces kill dozens of Palestinian protesters as anger mounts over US embassy move from Tel Aviv to Jerusalem; Australia will launch its own space agency to cash in on a $420 billion aeronautical industry and create thousands of new jobs; Scott Morrison gives Bill Shorten the nickname Unbelieva-Bill; breakfast television rivals Today and Sunrise are in the UK to compete for ratings in the lead up to the Royal Wedding; the Wedding of Prince Harry and Meghan Markle (with Jonathan Pie); the UN World Water Development Report warns that five billion people will be living in areas with poor access to water by 2050; as NAPLAN celebrates 10 years in 2018, there are calls from parents, teachers and politicians to dump NAPLAN due to test results being used as a school rating system where teachers are encouraged to teach for the test rather than the curriculum that leads to lower reading and writing skills; teachers will be trained to identify students with mental health problems and the potential for children to become terrorists.
61	4	"Episode 4"	Missy Higgins, Alex Edelman	Andrew Denton	(none)	23 May 2018	434,000
Topics: Prince Harry and Meghan Markle get married and become the Duke and Duchess of Sussex; a Fairfax Media investigation has revealed that Commonwealth Bank staff were depositing small amounts of money into children's Dollarmites accounts without customers consent or knowledge by using their own loose change or the bank's money to pump up thousands of accounts in an attempt to gain sales performance bonuses and financial rewards; almost 200 athletes who came to Australia for the Gold Coast Commonwealth Games have applied for refugee visas following earlier reports that around 250 overseas athletes were still in Australia even though their visas have expired; Department of Parliamentary Services assistant secretary Graeme Anderson admits to tasting a suspicious lump of white powder to confirm it was not a safety threat; ten people shot dead in Santa Fe High School mass shooting in US (with Alex Edelman); Bishop Michael Curry received mixed reviews on the delivery of his sermon at the Wedding of Prince Harry and Meghan Markle; the Auditory illusion of a voice recording of Yanny or Laurel divides the Internet; Dental care and Oral hygiene.
62	5	"Episode 5"	(none)	Todd Sampson	Randy Feltface in New York as US correspondent	30 May 2018	605,000
Topics: Barnaby Joyce takes personal leave amid criticisms of his tell-all TV interview; Queensland Nickel's liquidator has won a Supreme Court bid to freeze Clive Palmer's personal assets in an effort to recover millions of dollars from the 2016 collapse of the north Queensland refinery; Queensland LNP senator Ian Macdonald has questioned whether there is enough racism in Australia to justify having a national race discrimination commissioner; Al Jazeera aired allegations that a criminal claims two unnamed Australian batsmen were paid to bat slowly during a period of play in the Test between Australia and India in Ranchi in 2017; a record 358 people owing child support payments have been caught at airports and seaports and given the choice of either paying up or turning back, resulting in $10.4 million being recouped; Barnaby Joyce claims the money he received from the tell-all TV interview will be placed in a trust fund for the son he fathered with Vikki Campion; Hot desking (with Kitty Flanagan); Formula One wants to trademark the term shoey which made global news as a tradition Daniel Ricciardo adopted to celebrate his victories on the podium; proposal to ban plastic drinking straws and replace them with paper straws in New York restaurants and cafes (with Randy Feltface).
63	6	"Episode 6"	Tina Arena	(none)	(none)	6 June 2018	512,000
Topics: The Australian Medical Association urges Netflix to stop the screening of Pete Evans's documentary about the Ketogenic diet which Evans claims can alleviate everything from asthma, autism and cancer; criminal syndicates are bribing teenage athletes to fix matches and launder money; On the Run petrol service stations in Adelaide have banned customers from bringing their reusable coffee cups to refill at the petrol station due to health and hygiene concerns; an off-duty FBI agent from Denver in the US is under investigation after he accidentally fired his gun and wounded another customer in the leg while performing a backflip at a Denver nightclub; Russian journalist Arkady Babchenko appeared at a news conference in Kiev, Ukraine, to reveal he staged his own death to stop a real assassination plot against him; Victorian councils in Australia are considering banning children's books that contain the words "girl" and "boy" to stop children ascribing to gender stereotypes.
64	7	"Episode 7"	Roy and HG	Adam Gilchrist	(none)	13 June 2018	640,000
Topics: Nick Kyrgios has reignited his feud with Dawn Fraser, labelling her ‘’racist’’ in a tweet after she was appointed an Officer of the Order of Australia in the Queen’s birthday honours, where Fraser told Kyrgios and Bernard Tomic to “go back to where their parents came from” in 2015; Pope Francis announced in his June prayer video for people to be more inclusive and respectful on social media regardless of their differences; oBike will no longer operate in Melbourne following a crackdown by Victoria’s Environment Protection Authority to force the bicycle share company to comply with new regulations including 24 hours to remove damaged or vandalised bicycles, 48 hours to remove bicycles from trees and rooftops, seven days to collect bicycles in rivers and oBike will face a $3,000 fine every time it fails to comply; US President Trump criticises the European Union on trade at the 44th G7 summit and called Justin Trudeau ‘’meek and mild’’ and ‘’dishonest and weak’’; US President Trump and North Korean leader Kim Jong-un meet for talks in Singapore; Kombucha (with Kitty Flanagan).
65	8	"Episode 8"	Guy Pearce	Tim Wilson	(none)	20 June 2018	659,000
Topics: Liberal Party members have called on the Turnbull government to privatise the ABC and move Australia's embassy in Israel to Jerusalem; Clive Palmer announced his return to politics by changing the name of his deregistered party from Palmer United Party to United Australia Party to contest the next federal election; US President Trump withdraws USA from United Nations Human Rights Council and continues with his policy by forcibly separating children from their parents at the Mexico–United States border and locking children in cages; five male students from Charles Sturt University who dressed in Ku Klux Klan robes and hoods with one man in blackface and black body paint for an end-of-semester party at the Black Swan Hotel in Wagga Wagga will be investigated after the university’s vice-chancellor condemned their actions; Football fans in Australia were angry at Optus for prolonged technical problems and failure to deliver live coverage of the 2018 FIFA World Cup on mobile apps and the Optus webpage and are calling for refunds and handing over coverage to SBS; the World Health Organisation has classified gaming addiction as a mental health condition; Australian schools have issued warnings to parents about the negative effects the video game Fortnite has on children that include online bullying, inappropriate language and abuse; Coles moves baby formula behind the counter to ward off bulk-buying for resale in China; South Australia became the first state to adopt a royal commission recommendation to legally compel clergy to report child sexual abuse revealed in confession where priests who hear about child sex abuse during confession will have a mandatory obligation to report the matter to police; the Acting Archbishop of Adelaide Greg O’Kelly says the South Australian Catholic Church will not adhere to a change in law compelling priests to report confessions of child sexual abuse despite a maximum fine of $10,000 in South Australia for not reporting child sex abuse.
66	9	"Episode 9"	Sally Pearson	Grant Denyer	(none)	27 June 2018	630,000
Topics: The Turnbull government’s income tax cuts have passed the federal parliament, with the tax cuts to be rolled out in three stages over seven years, costing the budget more than $143.9 billion in forgone revenue after a decade and making it harder for the government to return the budget to surplus; the National Rugby League showed support for State of Origin opponents Karina Brown and Vanessa Foliaki after a social media backlash from some angry fans regarding a photograph of the two women kissing after the game in Sydney; Prime Minister of New Zealand Jacinda Ardern gave birth to a baby girl, making Ardern the second world leader to give birth while in office after Pakistan's then-prime minister Benazir Bhutto 28 years ago; Koko the gorilla who learned sign language and loved kittens, died in her sleep at the age of 46; Woolworths begins its plastic bag ban at its supermarkets to help reduce plastic waste; income tax returns (with Kitty Flanagan); Australia is out of the 2018 FIFA World Cup after losing 2-0 to Peru.
67	10	"Episode 10"	Eddie Perfect	Fiona O'Loughlin	(none)	4 July 2018	575,000
Topics: Grant Denyer wins the 2018 Gold Logie Award for Most Popular Personality on Australian Television; a brawl erupted on court involving The Boomers and Philippine players during their basketball World Cup qualifier in the Philippines resulting in 4 Australian players and 9 Philippines players ejected; former Malaysian prime minister Najib Razak was arrested for allegedly embezzling billions from a government fund in the 1MDB scandal; Bill Shorten backs down on his call to repeal the Coalition’s company tax cuts for small to medium-sized businesses by keeping the 27.5 per cent corporate tax rate for companies with a turnover of between $10 million and $50 million; the Nauru government has banned the ABC from covering the Pacific Islands Forum and refused to issue visas to ABC journalists because of alleged interference in its politics, bias and false reporting; David Leyonhjelm refused to apologise for telling Greens MP Sarah Hanson-Young to “stop shagging men” despite her pending legal action; Woolworths back-flipped on its plastic bag ban by handing out free reusable plastic bags for 10 days after irate customers refused to pay 15 cents for each plastic bag or they did not have enough of their own.
68	11	"Episode 11"	Ben Harper	(none)	(none)	11 July 2018	448,000
Topics: Tham Luang cave rescue; a pride of lions killed and ate a group of rhino poachers who broke into a South African wildlife reserve; Australia and the US celebrate their first 100 years of mateship to commemorate the times Australian and American troops fought side by side since 4 July 1918 at the Battle of Hamel; Mark Latham records robocalls for Pauline Hanson's One Nation party to urge voters not to vote for Labor in the Longman by-election campaign because he says Bill Shorten lied about his MPs’ dual citizenship status; Shannon Noll launches an expletive-filled tirade at a crowd member who threw a can of beer on stage while Noll was performing at the Duck Creek Picnic Races in Nyngan, NSW; Podcasting (with Kitty Flanagan).
69	12	"Episode 12"	Hannah Gadsby, Dilruk Jayasinha, Theja Surapaneni, Fiona O’Loughlin, Emily Taheny, Denise Scott, John Lane, Sammy J, Randy Feltface	Rob Mills	Jonathan Pie	18 July 2018	663,000
Topics: US President Donald Trump met Russian president Vladimir Putin in Helsinki to discuss US and Russia relations and national security issues; US President Donald Trump receives criticism for praising Vladimir Putin just days after the US laid criminal charges against twelve Russians for hacking and leaking emails of senior Democrats during the 2016 presidential election campaign; British cave explorer Vernon Unsworth who helped rescue 12 boys and their soccer coach from a Thai cave criticised Elon Musk’s child-size submarine as a publicity stunt so Musk ranted on Twitter calling Unsworth a paedophile; the Groves family from Queensland will be the first to bring Avozilla to Australia, which is a giant avocado originating from South Africa and is up to five times the size of a regular avocado; Usain Bolt is negotiating a deal to join the A-League team Central Coast Mariners in Australia; US President Donald Trump receives criticism for lacking decorum and etiquette after he arrived late to meet the Queen, where she waited alone on the stage, and for walking and standing in front of her during his visit to Windsor Castle; US President Donald Trump criticises UK Prime Minister Theresa May’s handling of the Brexit deal and praised her conservative party rival Boris Johnson as a potentially great prime minister in an interview before meeting with her for the Blenheim Palace Gala in the UK; protests in the UK as US President Donald Trump arrives to meet UK Prime Minister Theresa May and the Queen (with Jonathan Pie).
70	13	"Episode 13"	Bryan Dawe	Ben Fordham	TBA	25 July 2018	585,000
Topics: Satirical skit for Channel Ten’s all-male hosted shows for the channel’s Pilot Week; Labor is under pressure to avoid losing any seats in the Super Saturday by-elections in Mayo, Perth, Longman, Braddon and Fremantle that resulted from citizenship issues for incumbent politicians; Federal Health Minister Greg Hunt orders an immediate review into his department’s use of Instagram influencers to encourage women to do more exercise following a report in News Corp media that the government paid thousands of dollars to social influencers who use racist language, homophobic slurs and endorse alcohol brands; teachers are asked to weigh school children and record the results as a way to fight childhood obesity; the Thai children and their soccer coach who were rescued from a Thai cave speak to the media for the first time after leaving hospital; the Queen felt angry that false claims of her husband Prince Philip’s death were circulating online despite no official confirmation or statement was released by the Palace; news media reporting on politics in similar ways as their coverage of sport; Cloud storage (with Kitty Flanagan); visual arts exhibition titled Passage inspired by time spent in the Moroccan port of Tangier (with Bryan Dawe).
71	14	"Episode 14"	Mel Buttle, Jeff Horn, Adam Bandt	Virginia Trioli	Adam Briggs	1 August 2018	573,000
Topics: Coles backflipped on its decision to ban all single-use plastic bags from its stores and charge 15 cents for each bag by giving customers the plastic bags free of charge indefinitely; Nine announced a $4 billion takeover of Fairfax Media; Prime Minister Hun Sen’s Cambodian People’s Party wins all 125 seats in Cambodia’s parliament amid claims that the vote was a sham after a crackdown on rival party Cambodia National Rescue Party; Virginia congressional candidate Leslie Cockburn criticises her opponent Denver Riggleman for campaigning with a white supremacist and liking Bigfoot erotica; Labor retains the seats of Braddon, Longman, Fremantle and Perth in the Super Saturday by-election; complaints about the NDIS increased with issues regarding access to funds and support, failure to correct administrative errors, government outsourcing jobs to contractors, and fraud against NDIS users involving thousands of dollars being siphoned from support packages; Same-sex marriage (with Mel Buttle); Egyptian student Mahmoud Sarhan’s photograph of a zebra at an Egyptian zoo went viral on social media after allegations that the zoo painted black stripes on a donkey to look like a zebra.
72	15	"Episode 15"	Barnaby Joyce, Amanda Keller, Chris Brown, Nazeem Hussain, Steve Price, Todd Sampson, Russel Howcroft, Susie Youssef, Tommy Little	Sarah Harris	(none)	8 August 2018	585,000
Topics: AFL CEO Gillon McLachlan is criticised for shortening the AFL Women’s competition structure in 2019 from a seven week season to a six match season with two week final series despite the addition of two new teams North Melbourne and Geelong; West Coast midfielder Andrew Gaff has been suspended for eight weeks for punching Andrew Brayshaw in the head during the western derby match between the Eagles and Fremantle; an inquiry has found staff at poker machine venues owned by Woolworths spied on punters and offered extra free drinks to "high-value" customers in a bid to boost profits which are contrary to the company's commitment to responsible gambling; Yellow and purple Wiggles Emma Watkins and Lachlan Gillespie have announced their separation just two years after they married; following angry outbursts from viewers, Sky News Australia says it was wrong to air an interview with far-right nationalist and neo-Nazi Blair Cottrell who has a history of crime and violence; rules for life (with Kitty Flanagan); the Turnbull government is criticised for giving $444 million to The Great Barrier Reef Foundation, that has links to big resources companies, without a competitive tender and the foundation’s CEO admits to not seeking the grant money.
73	16	"Episode 16"	Denise Scott, Eddie Izzard	(none)	(none)	15 August 2018	546,000
Topics: The Coalition, Labor, the Greens and even One Nation leader Pauline Hanson condemned crossbench senator Fraser Anning for his racially inflammatory first Senate speech invoking the White Australia policy and using the term ‘final solution’ which is used by the Nazis to describe a genocidal policy of exterminating Jewish people; US President Donald Trump officially directed the Pentagon to establish a sixth branch of the U.S. military in space while speaking at a National Space Council meeting at the White House, and he called for a "space force" to ensure American dominance in space; racehorse Chautauqua, one of Australia’s much-loved and most successful sprinters is known by punters for his thrilling, last-to-first wins, but can no longer be coaxed to race; Natural Cycles, a contraceptive app to prevent unwanted pregnancies by tracking a woman’s body temperature, is under fire after 37 women became pregnant when using the app as a primary form of birth control in Sweden; according to an Australian Competition & Consumer Commission investigation, the two main reasons power bills are skyrocketing for Australian households are network costs of excessive number of poles and wires, and wholesale electricity costs which is when the power energy providers buy in bulk from the generators; The Academy announced three key changes to the Academy Awards ceremony which are shortening the telecast to three hours, setting an earlier date for the ceremony, and adding a new category for outstanding achievement in popular film (with Denise Scott); The Flip Side film (with Eddie Izzard).
74	17	"Episode 17"	Jimmy Barnes	Rove McManus	(none)	22 August 2018	625,000
Topics: Parody skit of the Liberal Party leadership spill; Peter Dutton resigns as Home Affairs Minister to challenge Malcolm Turnbull for the leadership of the Liberal Party; Malcolm Turnbull has won a leadership ballot against Peter Dutton by 48 votes to 35 in the Liberal Party Room; Labor MP Jenny Macklin has asked "who is the Prime Minister?" and referred to Malcolm Turnbull as a ‘’dead man walking’’ after Peter Dutton confirmed he will challenge Turnbull over his leadership; Internet challenges (with Kitty Flanagan); Working Class Boy documentary film (with Jimmy Barnes).
75	18	"Episode 18"	Matt Groening	Human Nature	Adam Briggs	29 August 2018	575,000
Topics: Scott Morrison won the Liberal Party leadership and was sworn in as prime minister after Malcolm Turnbull agreed to a second leadership spill, which Morrison won against Peter Dutton by 45 votes to 40; during his resignation speech, Malcolm Turnbull lashed out at those including Tony Abbott and Peter Dutton who wrecked and created chaos within the Liberal Party; shortly after Scott Morrison was announced as a leadership contender, Julie Bishop was confirmed as another contender in the second leadership spill against Peter Dutton; Julie Bishop was eliminated in the first round of the party room vote after she won eleven votes and none of her West Australian colleagues voted for her in the second leadership ballot; Children’s birthday parties (with Kitty Flanagan); Alan Jones sparked outrage on social media after using the word ‘nigger’ on his radio show while discussing the Liberal party leadership crisis (with Adam Briggs); conflicting scientific research studies; Matt Groening’s Disenchantment (with Adam Briggs).
76	19	"Episode 19"	Roy and HG	Roxy Jacenko	(none)	5 September 2018	619,000
Topics: A joint ABC-Fairfax Media investigation reported that tests at an international lab specialising in honey fraud detection found almost half the honey samples selected from supermarket shelves were “adulterated”, meaning they had been mixed with something other than nectar from bees, and the adulterated samples were all products that blend local and imported honey; the NRL and the Canterbury-Bankstown Bulldogs have launched an investigation after News Corp Australia pictures showed Bulldog players nude, vomitting on the street and passed out during their end-of-season drinks at a Sydney hotel; friends, family, fans, celebrities and dignitaries paid their final respects to Aretha Franklin at her funeral service held in Greater Grace Temple in Detroit, with tributes from guests including Stevie Wonder, Ariana Grande, Jennifer Hudson and former US president Bill Clinton; Scott Morrison tries to re-invent his image as the new prime minister with catchphrases like "have a go and get a go"; Scott Morrison says he will never become involved in any debate about gay Conversion therapy, which has been discredited by psychiatrists across the world, despite survivors, churches and community advocates urging the Morrison government to address the issue ahead of the next election; Superannuation in Australia; Cultured meat or clean meat may be the future to reduce the environmental impact of livestock and address the world's increased meat consumption; Australian John Millman defeated the second seed Roger Federer in the fourth round of the US Open in four sets (with Roy and HG).
77	20	"Episode 20"	Olivia Newton-John, Gatesy (Steven Gates from Tripod)	Paul Kelly	(none)	12 September 2018	651,000
Topics: Scott Morrison refers to the Liberal Party leadership spill, which made him prime minister, as The Muppet Show; the concept of quotas was raised as Liberal MP Sussan Ley calls for more women in parliament following the resignations of Julie Bishop and Julia Banks from the Liberal Party; India's Supreme Court decriminalises gay sex; the Thai children who were rescued from a cave have re-enacted their experience at a cave exhibition in a shopping centre which sparked concerns from psychologists for the children's mental health; Naomi Osaka's US Open title win was overshadowed by Serena Williams's confrontation with an umpire; cartoonist Mark Knight's depiction of Serena Williams when she argued with an umpire and received code violations was criticised for relying on racist tropes and seen as racist and sexist; Opioid use disorder and addiction is on the rise in Australia as at least 800 people die each year from opioid overdose; Kitty Flanagan's departure.

=== Season 5 (2019) ===
No. overall	No. in season	Title	Featured guest	Hard Chat	International correspondent	Original release date	Australia viewers (millions)
79	1	"Episode 1"	Russell Howard	Richard Reid	(none)	20 March 2019	604,000
Topics: Christchurch mosque shootings in New Zealand; Fraser Anning was condemned for his comments about blaming the victims of the Christchurch mosque shootings in New Zealand, in which 50 Muslim worshippers were killed, when he claimed that immigration of "Muslim fanatics" led to the attacks; Following the Christchurch mosque shootings in New Zealand, Sunrise host David Koch confronted Pauline Hanson on the TV show suggesting right-wing white supremacists were egged on by her anti-Muslim comments; Scott Morrison denied reports that he ever told a shadow cabinet meeting in December 2010 that the Liberal Party members should exploit the anti-Muslim sentiment in Australia; New South Wales Labor leader Michael Daley faced criticism over his comments in a 2018 video where he claimed Asian workers were taking young people's jobs in Sydney; Cardinal George Pell was sentenced to six years in prison for sexually abusing two boys after Sunday Mass in 1996; UK Prime Minister Theresa May asks the European Union for an extension on the Brexit withdrawal agreement (with Russell Howard).
80	2	"Episode 2"	Michelle Wolf	Angela Bishop	(none)	27 March 2019	525,000
Topics: Liberal Vice President Teena McQueen shocked the Q&A audience with her comments supporting Donald Trump, Milo Yiannopoulos and white supremacy; Liberal leader Gladys Berejiklian was re-elected as Premier of New South Wales in the state election; In an interview with Waleed Aly on The Project, Scott Morrison admitted a discussion took place in a Liberal Party shadow cabinet meeting in 2010 regarding community fears about Muslims, but said his contribution was intended to “lower the fears about Islam and not elevate them”; A spectator was ejected from the Miami Open after being involved in a verbal altercation with Nick Kyrgios where Kyrgios claimed the spectator had made fun of his haircut; Melanie Brown claimed she had a sexual encounter with Geri Halliwell during the height of their Spice Girls days in the 1990s; vaginal daily skincare (with Judith Lucy); Al Jazeera released secretly filmed video footage of Pauline Hanson's One Nation's James Ashby and Steve Dickson in a meeting asking for millions of dollars in donations from the US gun lobby NRA and discussed weakening Australian gun laws; Recent video footage showed Pope Francis flinching and pulling away his hand as visitors tried to kiss his papal ring; Cricketer Brett Lee endorsed Tony Abbott for the seat of Warringah for the 2019 federal election; NASA cancelled an all-women spacewalk because the agency did not have enough spacesuits to fit the astronauts; Uri Geller claimed he could stop Brexit by using his powers of telepathy; Reports revealed convicted Cardinal George Pell's prison cell is next to the cells of Bourke Street killer, James Gargasoulas and IS terrorists Ertunc and Samed Eriklioglu at the Melbourne Assessment Prison; Russian local media reported that a naked man tried to board a Ural Airlines plane to Crimea at Moscow's Domodedovo Airport and was stopped by the airport staff before he could board; Studio 10 host Sarah Harris laughed at her on-air gaffe where she mistakenly said the acronym NAPLAN has seven letters.
81	3	"Episode 3"	Miranda Tapsell, Anthony Albanese	Anthony Callea	(none)	3 April 2019	610,000
Topics: Treasurer Josh Frydenberg said the Federal Budget report is "back in the black" but the Coalition has only forecast a surplus and is yet to deliver one; Josh Frydenberg claimed the Budget will not be a cash splash despite pledging to spend millions of dollars on infrastructure, health care and cracking down on welfare overpayments; Semi-naked climate change protesters interrupted a House of Commons Brexit debate and glued their hands to the glass of the public gallery, spending almost 20 minutes with their buttocks facing the chamber; Some dog owners refuse to vaccinate their pets for fear that doing so would cause their animals to become autistic; Eddie McGuire mocked double amputee Cynthia Banham when she conducted the coin toss at Friday night's AFL match between the Sydney Swans and Adelaide Crows at the Sydney Cricket Ground; Tiny house movement (with Judith Lucy); Bike riding with Adam Briggs and Anthony Albanese; Top End Wedding film (with Miranda Tapsell).
82	4	"Episode 4"	Roy and HG, Natasha Stott Despoja	(none)	(none)	10 April 2019	661,000
Topics: A post-budget Newspoll showed the Coalition narrowing the gap and trailed Labor 48-52 percent in two-party terms, while an Ipsos poll showed Labor ahead with 53-47 percent in two-party terms; The Electric Vehicle Council CEO said that Labor leader Bill Shorten was not wildly wrong when claiming that charging an electric car would take 8-10 minutes; Animal rights activists staged nationwide protests by shutting down major road intersections and broke into abattoirs then chained themselves up to protest against the meat industry; Australia's NBN turns 10 years old; The New York Times Magazine published an investigative report on Rupert Murdoch's media empire and Fox News; Sport with Roy and HG; On Violence book with Natasha Stott Despoja; Victoria's Labor government released its latest Respect Women: Call it Out ad campaign that brings men into the conversation, and highlights the important message that women are not responsible for the violence perpetrated against them and men have a responsibility to step up when women are treated with disrespect.
83	5	"Episode 5"	David Oyelowo, Cal Wilson, Tommy Little, Urzila Carlson, DeAnne Smith, Dilruk Jayasinha, Dave Thornton, Sam Simmons, Nick Cody	Craig Reucassel	(none)	17 April 2019	561,000
Topics: Prime Minister Scott Morrison sets May 18 election date for the 2019 federal election; Peter Dutton was widely criticised for accusing his Labor opponent, Ali France, of using her disability as an "excuse" for not living in the electorate of Dickson despite her efforts in looking for a wheelchair accessible home in Dickson; a fire engulfed Notre Dame cathedral in Paris and destroyed the landmark's spire and roof, however, the iconic towers were saved from the blaze, and French authorities said the cathedral's structure was "saved from total destruction"; Record-breaking mare Winx won her final race in one last dominant performance in the Queen Elizabeth Stakes at Royal Randwick, and the victory means the seven-year-old mare extended her winning streak to an unprecedented 33 consecutive races; Tiger Woods put the sex scandals and injuries behind him to take out the US Masters for the fifth time; Cryotherapy and ATP charger (with Judith Lucy); Julian Assange faced extradition to the United States and up to five years in prison after he was forcibly dragged from the Ecuadorian embassy in London, ending a seven-year diplomatic stalemate.
84	6	"Episode 6"	Liz Cambage	Ben Elton	(none)	24 April 2019	537,000
Topics: As both party leaders paused their official campaigns on Easter Sunday, Scott Morrison invited the media into his Pentecostal Church in Sydney for the first time, while Bill Shorten and his family attended the Easter service at St Andrew’s Anglican church in Brisbane; Bill Shorten promised to "stop the rot" of penalty rate cuts if Labor wins the next election as he campaigned at Luna Park in Melbourne; the latest poll suggested Clive Palmer's United Australia Party and his plan to buy his way into parliament could pay dividends, as he could hold as much as 14 per cent of the primary vote in key marginal seats; the Australian Football League's decision to book Birds of Tokyo for the Anzac Day match was met with outrage as the RSL claims it could evoke bad memories for Japan's prisoners of war; Penis facial (with Judith Lucy); Barnaby Joyce was pressured to provide more answers over an $80 million taxpayer-funded water deal when he was the Water Minister, and the Department of Agriculture and Water Resources bought 28 gigalitres of water from Eastern Australia Agriculture, a company once linked to now-Energy Minister Angus Taylor and based in the Cayman Islands.
85	7	"Episode 7"	(none)	Conrad Sewell	(none)	1 May 2019	617,000
Topics: One Nation's Senate candidate for Queensland Steve Dickson resigned after A Current Affair released video footage of him making derogatory comments about women and groping a female dancer a dozen times in a Washington, D.C., strip club; One Nation leader Pauline Hanson accepted Steve Dickson's resignation and said his "language and behaviour was unacceptable"; following Steve Dickson's resignation from One Nation, the party's leader Pauline Hanson appeared on A Current Affair saying she was disgusted by the behaviour Dickson exhibited in the video footage, and that he had let her down; the first leaders’ debate of the election campaign between Scott Morrison and Bill Shorten was held in Perth and screened on Channel 7; Australian cricketer James Faulkner attracted widespread attention after appearing to come out as gay in social media posts but later clarified on social media that there had been a “misunderstanding” and he is not gay; Police in China arrested four people after raiding a Chinese toy-maker called Lepin, which was accused of manufacturing and selling $30m worth of counterfeit Lego products; wellness celebrities and health product endorsements (with Judith Lucy); Australian politics with Adam Briggs; ISIS leader Abu Bakr al-Baghdadi made a rare video appearance only to be described by mainstream media as being "fat, overweight and larger".
86	8	"Episode 8"	Herbie Hancock	(none)	(none)	8 May 2019	589,000
Topics: Meghan, Duchess of Sussex gave birth to a son; Rugby Australia’s code of conduct panel ruled that Israel Folau committed a high-level breach of his contract by posting a religiously-inspired, anti-gay comment on social media and the three-person panel will determine Folau’s punishment, which includes the potential to terminate his $4million, four-year contract; a woman was charged with common assault after allegedly striking Scott Morrison on the back of the head with an egg, which bounced off his head and did not smash, during a Country Women's Association event in Albury; Bill Shorten calls Scott Morrison a "classic space invader" when Morrison confronted Shorten by standing very close to him while talking; Bill Shorten launched the Labor election campaign with former Labor leaders and prime ministers Julia Gillard, Kevin Rudd and Paul Keating attending as Bill Shorten focussed on health, education and living standards as central tenets of his election campaign strategy; Adult Swaddling or Otonamaki Japanese therapy (with Judith Lucy); Labor Robotics sketch (with Celia Pacquola and Greg Larsen).
87	9	"Episode 9"	P. J. Hogan	Stephen Curry	(none)	15 May 2019	510,000
Topics: Bill Shorten cuddled Labrador puppies at Guide Dogs Victoria and pledged $2 million to the centre, while Scott Morrison had an official election campaign launch which none of the past Liberal Party leaders attended; Pauline Hanson attempted to distance herself from Fraser Anning and called him “a racist”; American explorer Victor Vescovo found plastic waste on the seafloor including plastic bags and confectionery wrappers while breaking the record for the deepest ever dive, when he descended nearly 11 kilometres (seven miles) in the Pacific Ocean's Mariana Trench; Meghan, Duchess of Sussex posted a photograph of her baby son’s feet on social media for Mothers’ Day; Facebook was found to be auto-generating videos of terrorism including executions and severed heads which made it through Facebook’s algorithms and are readily available to publicly access; In a segment on Sky News, Alan Jones used a bowl of rice to explain that Australia’s 1.3 percent of global carbon dioxide emissions from human activity is too small to make a difference to climate change, while ignoring the fact that Australia’s population is 0.3 percent of the global total; turning Scott Morrison into Scomo; Muriel’s Wedding the Musical (with P.J. Hogan).
88	10	"Episode 10"	Annabel Crabb, Christopher Pyne, Jessica Mauboy, Adam Briggs, Ross Noble, Jimeoin	The Proclaimers	(none)	22 May 2019	573,000
Topics: You Can't Ask That sketch with The Weekly cast; Federal election results: Scott Morrison’s shock election win to become Australia’s prime minister, Tony Abbott lost his seat of Warringah to Zali Steggall; Derryn Hinch and Fraser Anning lost their Senate seat while Clive Palmer failed to win a seat in Parliament, Jacqui Lambie returned to the Senate as an Independent; Duncan Laurence won the Eurovision Song Contest 2019 for The Netherlands with his song titled ‘Arcade’; Internet feline star Grumpy Cat, whose real name is Tardar Sauce and became famous for her signature frown, died at the age of seven; Nick Kyrgios faced suspension from the ATP after he threw a chair and kicked a bottle at the Italian open during a tantrum; Adult cuddle party (with Judith Lucy); Australian former prime minister Bob Hawke died at age 89.
89	11	"Episode 11"	Roy and HG, Taron Egerton	Jessica Mauboy	Andy Zaltzman	29 May 2019	605,000
Topics: Jack and Robin Firestone promoted their historical fiction book Chasing Diana: Perception versus Reality on Sunrise fuelling speculations about Princess Diana’s death in 1997; Ark Encounter, a theme park in Kentucky whose centrepiece is a giant replica of Noah’s Ark, sued its insurance company for rain damage to its property; the World Health Organisation announced they have added video gaming addiction as an official mental health disorder to the International Statistical Classification of Diseases and Related Health Problems and changes are slated to be added in January 2022; Lance Armstrong told NBC sports reporter Mike Tirico in an interview that he would not change anything about his past on drug cheating; US President Trump called for a probe into Australia’s role in Russia’s interference with the 2016 US election; Steve Smith booed at the Cricket World Cup, Serena Williams wore a zebra-striped outfit designed by Virgil Abloh and produced by Nike at the French Open that featured the words "mother, champion, queen and goddess" in French (with Roy and HG); UK Prime Minister Theresa May announced her resignation as Tory Party leader and prime minister to be effective 7 June 2019; Rocketman film (with Taron Egerton).
90	12	"Episode 12"	Esther Perel	Jimmy Barnes	(none)	5 June 2019	486,000
Topics: Prime Minister Scott Morrison gave the Queen a signed copy of the official biography of champion racehorse Winx called Winx: The Official Biography by former The Age journalist Andrew Rule during his first meeting with the monarch at Buckingham Palace; US President Donald Trump and First lady Melania Trump met with the Queen during a two-day visit to Britain and while on a tour of Royal Collection artifacts at Buckingham Palace's picture gallery, Melania corrected her husband when he forgot that he had previously gave the Queen a pewter horse as a gift during his visit in 2018; 4th of June 2019 marked the 30th anniversary of the Tiananmen Square massacres where in 1989 the Chinese government brutally shut down long running student protests, killing thousands of people in and around the central square in Beijing, and continues the campaign by the Chinese government to try to erase the memory and rewrite the history of the bloody military suppression of peaceful unarmed protesters and residents of Beijing; Rugby Australia sacked Israel Folau for homophobic social media posts; Kym Abrook from Adelaide’s western suburb Fulham Gardens, chased an intruder from his property while dressed only in his underpants and wielding a didgeridoo; the 92nd Scripps National Spelling Bee competition ended in an unprecedented eight-way tie when organisers ran out of challenging words after hours of intense competition among American youngsters tackling some of the English language's most obscure words; Mindfulness and meditation with animals (with Judith Lucy); Indigenous rugby players from the Queensland Maroons and NSW Blues refused to sing the national anthem at the opening game for the State of Origin series because the anthem does not represent their indigenous heritage (with Adam Briggs); Modern love in the digital age at 2019 Vivid Sydney Festival and the podcast series Where Should I Begin? (with Esther Perel).
91	13	"Episode 13"	Micky Dolenz, Michael Nesmith, Susie Youssef, Catriona Rowntree	Costa Georgiadis	(none)	12 June 2019	514,000
Topics: AFP raids on the media sketch with The Weekly cast; Ash Barty became the first Australian in 46 years to win the French Open after defeating teenage star Markéta Vondroušová 6-1, 6-3 in the final; the Australian Federal Police raided the ABC offices in Sydney over a series of stories from 2017 known as The Afghan Files by ABC investigative journalists Dan Oakes and Sam Clark, that revealed allegations of unlawful killings and misconduct by Australian special forces in Afghanistan, just a day after the AFP executed search warrants on the home of News Corp journalist Annika Smethurst who had reported on secret plans to allow government spying; Three Chinese warships surprised many Australians by quietly entering Sydney Harbour where they landed at the Garden Island naval base, and Chinese military personnel were seen loading highly sought after Australian baby formula, face masks and other products onto a warship before leaving Sydney Harbour; Pope Francis reportedly approved changes to the wording of the Lord's Prayer, from "Lead us not into temptation," to "Do not let us fall into temptation"; UK conservative candidates contesting to replace Theresa May as Tory Party leader and Prime Minister who admitted to past drug use included Boris Johnson, Jeremy Hunt, Michael Gove and Rory Stewart; The Monkees Australian tour (with Micky Dolenz and Michael Nesmith); 10th anniversary of Japan’s office chair Grand Prix.
92	14	"Episode 14"	Carrie Bickmore	Grant Denyer asking Tom Gleeson questions in a Hard Chat segment renamed Small Talk	(none)	19 June 2019	583,000
Topics: Sam Kerr kicked four goals for The Matildas in a 4-1 win over Jamaica to see Australia progress to the knock-out stages of the FIFA Women's World Cup; the crackdown on AFL crowd behaviour to tackle violence and abusive language left some AFL fans angry as "Behavioural Awareness Officers" and security guards in high-viz vests, employed by security company AIG, patrolled the aisles of football stadiums; almost two million people filled the streets of Hong Kong on Sunday to protest against a government proposal to allow extraditions to mainland China, which critics fear could be used to send dissidents to face trial in mainland courts controlled by China’s Communist Party; American former football star and actor O. J. Simpson, who is best known for his trial and acquittal for the murders of his former wife Nicole Brown Simpson and her friend Ron Goldman, has launched a new Twitter account; Kmart apologised and blamed a computer systems error after customers Anthony Dorsett and his wife, Marelynda, attempted to print and caption photographs for a church group but found that certain Christian-related words including “God”, “church”, “Jesus”, “Jewish” and “Bible” were deemed to be profanity and replaced by asterisks yet “mosque”, “Islam” and “Koran” were found to be acceptable; Corporate Wellness (with Judith Lucy and The Weekly cast); Charlie Pickering’s name was an answer to a question on The Chase Australia which contestants answered incorrectly; motherhood, blended families, longevity in the media industry and The Point to Pinnacle challenge in Tasmania to raise funds for brain cancer research (with Carrie Bickmore).

=== Season 6 (2020) ===
No. overall	No. in season	Title	Featured guest	Hard Chat	International correspondent	Original release date	Australia viewers (millions)
94	1	"Episode 1"	Ryan Fitzgerald	(none)	(none)	29 April 2020	611,000
Topics: COVID-19 reportedly emerged from a wet market in Wuhan, China; high profile individuals such as Andrew Bolt, Alan Jones and US President Donald Trump denied the existence and severity of COVID-19; Iran’s deputy health minister Iraj Harirchi confirmed he had COVID-19 one day after he appeared sweaty and pale at a news conference downplaying the severity of the COVID-19 pandemic; high profile people in the entertainment industry including Tom Hanks, Rita Wilson and Idris Elba contracted COVID-19; panic buying of toilet paper occurred soon after the Prime Minister Scott Morrison announced Australia has a COVID-19 pandemic; some state premiers allowed parents to keep their children at home for home schooling despite Prime Minister Scott Morrison urging parents to keep taking their children to schools; some people seen at Sydney beaches failing to physical distance in public were warned and charged by police; as social isolation from public places and self-isolation at home increased, many animals were seen roaming the city streets searching for food; the Therapeutic Goods Administration fined celebrity chef Pete Evans $25,000 for claims Evans made about a product called a ‘BioCharger’ which allegedly treats COVID-19; AFL chief executive Gillon McLachlan announced the temporary suspension of all matches for the 2020 season until 31st May and the AFLW women’s season will end immediately with no premiership awarded; the Australian Rugby League Commission and the National Rugby League announced the suspension of the 2020 season in response to advice from government health officials and biosecurity experts, and travel bans by the Queensland and New Zealand governments; in a proposal to restart the NRL 2020 season during the COVID-19 pandemic, the NRL players union considered taking players to grounds on a remote island such as Tangalooma Island Resort to play without any contact with the public; the use of video conferencing platforms and apps increased with remote work during the COVID-19 pandemic. The United States surpassed China and Italy to become the nation with the highest number of confirmed cases of COVID-19 in the world; US President Donald Trump suggested injecting disinfectants as a treatment for COVID-19 during a White House press briefing; Indonesia’s Krakatoa volcano erupted twice during the night of Friday 10 April and spewed plumes of ash 500 metres into the air; two forest fires broke out near the village of Vladimirovka within the uninhabited Chernobyl exclusion zone which spiked radiation levels near the site of the Chernobyl nuclear reactor; the number of tornadoes in the United States increased significantly as the National Weather Service confirmed above average activity for April 2020; a second wave of locusts in April threatened east Africa, following the February swarm of locusts, posing an alarming threat to food security and livelihoods; Australia’s Great Barrier Reef experienced its third mass bleaching event in five years and scientists blame the rapid global warming due to human emissions of heat-trapping gases; Australia’s High Court acquitted George Pell and quashed his criminal convictions for charges related to alleged child sex abuse of two choirboys in 1996; former Hollywood movie mogul Harvey Weinstein was served a 23-year prison sentence following his conviction for rape, and he was certified as a sex offender with 20 years for the criminal sex act and three years for rape to be served consecutively; the stock market experienced its largest plunge for the Dow Jones Industrial Average caused by global fears about the COVID-19 pandemic, oil price drops and looming recessions; unconfirmed rumours claimed North Korean leader Kim Jong-un died or was near death with no hope of recovery; the World Health Organisation approved the re-opening of wet markets in China despite reports of COVID-19 originating from a wet market in Wuhan; surviving the COVID-19 pandemic (with Judith Lucy); the Australian government released a COVID-19 contact tracing app named COVIDSafe despite concerns regarding data retention and privacy; discussing Greg Norman (with Ryan ‘Fitzy’ Fitzgerald); negative gearing (with Luke McGregor).
95	2	"Episode 2"	Lisa Gibbs	Poppy Parker the dog (Tom Gleeson’s Cavalier King Charles Spaniel)	Rosebud Baker (US Correspondent)	6 May 2020	591,000
Topics: Prime Minister Scott Morrison told journalists at a news conference that Australians can go to the pub sooner if they download the COVID-19 contact tracing app named COVIDSafe; Police in Chandigarh India used giant tongs attached to a 5-foot pole to safely round up people violating the COVID-19 lockdowns; Australian billionaire Andrew Forrest and his Minderoo Foundation secured 10 million COVID-19 testing kits which will be distributed to hospitals, clinics and laboratories around Australia, however, the Federal Government will reimburse the full amount of $325 million which Minderoo spent to buy the equipment; Andrew Forrest blindsided Federal Health Minister Greg Hunt by not informing him that China's Victorian Consul General Long Zhou will be at the news conference to celebrate the COVID-19 test kits deal; Federal Education Minister Dan Tehan attacked Victorian premier Dan Andrews on ABC’s Insiders for the tough stance in Victoria on allowing children to stay at home and not go to school unless other arrangements cannot be made or children were vulnerable; Dan Tehan withdrew his comments to Dan Andrews following the announcement that a teacher tested positive for COVID-19 at Meadow Glen primary school in Epping; UK Prime Minister Boris Johnson’s finance Carrie Symonds gave birth to a son; Life after the COVID-19 pandemic (with Judith Lucy and Professor Lisa Gibbs); the aviation industry was one of the first sectors affected by the COVID-19 pandemic with airlines worldwide grounding their aeroplanes; the COVID-19 pandemic in the US (with Rosebud Baker); Superannuation (with Luke McGregor).
96	3	"Episode 3"	Miriam Margoyles, Rhys Nicholson	Andrew Gaze	(none)	13 May 2020	638,000
Topics: Victorian Police clashed with protesters in Melbourne for failing to comply with physical distancing rules as up to 100 people demanded an end to COVID-19 lockdowns as well as opposition to 5G networks, vaccinations and called for Bill Gates to be arrested; Prime Minister Scott Morrison announced a pandemic roadmap called 3-Step Framework For a COVIDSafe Australia which enables the states and territories to gradually ease COVID-19 lockdown restrictions; Liberal MP Tim Smith accused Victorian premier Dan Andrews of fear mongering and for failing to ease Victoria’s COVID-19 lockdowns in time for Mothers’ Day; Rates of the sexually transmitted infection gonorrhoea rose by 20 per cent on the Gold Coast, and eliminating the infection is difficult as the bacteria becomes increasingly antibiotic-resistant; a by-election for the seat of Eden-Monaro was announced following Labor MP Mike Kelly’s sudden resignation due to health reasons; Communication using emojis during the COVID-19 pandemic (with Rhys Nicholson); Australia's National Rugby League announced that it intends to resume its season on 28 May 2020 but released no details of the season’s structure or conditions under which matches will be played; three-part documentary series Miriam Margolyes: Almost Australian (with Miriam Margoyles); Alan Jones announced his resignation from radio station 2GB at the end of May 2020 following doctor’s advice.
97	4	"Episode 4"	Hannah Gadsby, Kitty Flanagan	(none)	(none)	20 May 2020	548,000
Topics: Restaurants, pubs and cafes around the world implemented physical distancing rules as COVID-19 lockdowns were eased including placing cutout cardboard humans or inflatable humans to make the premises appear full; Australian brewers are faced with the heartbreaking task of dumping millions of schooners of expired beer due to pubs, clubs, bars and restaurant closures during the COVID-19 restrictions; Federal Minister for Small and Family Business Michaelia Cash encouraged Australians to “have a curry for the country!” as the COVID-19 restrictions are relaxed for restaurants, pubs and cafes; The Australian Football League’s ban on players from inviting casual guests to their homes was dubbed the ‘bonk ban’ by the media which prohibit players from having visitors other than their partner, or a friend or family member providing care for their wellbeing, as it restarts its season on 11 June 2020 after a two-month hiatus due to COVID-19 restrictions; China is set to impose a devastating 80 per cent tariff on Australia’s barley imports, while imports from four major Australian meat processing plants were also banned, as Australia’s Foreign Minister Marise Payne insisted a motion that won support from more than 120 countries will pave the way for an impartial, independent and comprehensive investigation into the handling of the COVID-19 outbreak; Health and economic effects of smoking (with Luke McGregor); COVID-19 testing and staying physically and mentally fit during COVID-19 self-isolation (with Judith Lucy); Douglas TV comedy special on Netflix (with Hannah Gadsby); Jeff Bezos could be the world’s first trillionaire; COVID-19-friendly nursery rhymes for children during home schooling (with Kitty Flanagan).
98	5	"Episode 5"	Hamish Macdonald	Christian Wilkins	(none)	27 May 2020	486,000
Topics: The Federal Government’s JobKeeper scheme, which initially cost $130 billion to assist more than 6 million workers, was revealed to actually be $70 billion and given to 3.5 million employees; Federal Treasurer Josh Frydenberg called the JobKeeper cost blunder “good news” and confirmed the spare $60 billion would not be reallocated to other areas such as casual workers, university staff and the arts sector to ease financial strain for future generations; Australian states and territories South Australia, Western Australia, Queensland, Tasmania and the Northern Territory continue to keep their borders closed amid calls from the Federal Government to open the borders for trade and tourism; An emotional revelation Kyle Sandilands delivered in a 60 Minutes promo regarding him secretly battling a serious health issue was revealed to be a joke; US President Donald Trump was criticised for playing golf in Virginia over Memorial Day weekend, making it his 265th time golfing since becoming president, as the US death toll from COVID-19 rose closer to 100,000; Sports rorts saga (with Judith Lucy); Despite Sweden having the highest death toll of all the Scandinavian and European countries, there are claims that Sweden’s approach to mitigating the spread of COVID-19 by isolating the vulnerable and their carers, herd immunity, and refusal to implement lockdowns could assist in better preparing the country for a second wave of the virus while avoiding economic stress; Scott Morrison’s 2019 “miracle” election win, national bushfires debacle and COVID-19 management.
99	6	"Episode 6"	Baratunde Thurston, Hugo Weaving, Annabel Crabb	(none)	Andy Zaltzman	3 June 2020	533,000
Topics: The murder of African-American man George Floyd after an arrest by Minneapolis police officers sparked public outrage resulting in the George Floyd protests across the US against police brutality and police accountability towards African-Americans; The George Floyd protests turned violent in some US cities as stores were looted, damaged and police cars were set on fire following police firing tear gas and rubber bullets at some demonstrators; US President Donald Trump was criticised by civil rights activists for using the phrase "When the looting starts, the shooting starts" which referenced police chief Walter Headley’s words in response to the 1967 civil unrest in the US that were partially racially motivated; Australian reporters and media crew were physically attacked in the US while reporting on the protests; Video footage of a NSW police officer body slamming a teenage Aboriginal boy during an arrest went viral on social media; The Federal Government will refund $721 million worth of debts it clawed back through its controversial Robodebt scheme that affected more than 370,000 people after issuing computer-generated debt notices which made demands for payment from people who did not owe the Government any money; The National Rugby League season for 2020 restarted after the COVID-19 hiatus with the Parramatta Eels defeating the Brisbane Broncos; The National Rugby League announced it would review its screening process after its ‘Fan in the Stand’ scheme, which enabled fans to upload photographs of themselves to be used as cardboard cut-outs in the empty stadium, showed Adolf Hitler and British mass murderer Harold Shipman in the stadium; Hearts and Bones film (with Hugo Weaving); The conspiracy theory and fears that 5G networks cause and spread COVID-19; The George Floyd protests, lack of leadership from the US President, COVID-19 pandemic in the US and civil rights (with Baratunde Thurston); Chief Adviser to the UK Prime Minister Dominic Cummings broke COVID-19 lockdown rules when he travelled from London to Durham while he had COVID-19 symptoms (with Andy Zaltzman).
100	7	"Episode 7"	David Speers	(none)	(none)	10 June 2020	532,000
Topics: Hundreds of thousands of Australian protesters attended Black Lives Matter rallies across the country to demand an end to Indigenous deaths in custody and systemic racism following worldwide protests in response to the death of African-American man George Floyd at the hands of a white police officer in the United States; New Zealand Prime Minister Jacinda Ardern announced all COVID-19 restrictions will be lifted except stringent border controls following no new cases and no active cases of COVID-19 in New Zealand; Celebrity chef Pete Evans made a recording of his interview with 60 Minutes and threatened to leak his unedited version of the interview on social media if he felt unhappy with the current affairs show’s portrayal of him; Federal Treasurer Josh Frydenberg admitted Australia was in a recession; Prime Minister Scott Morrison announced the $688 million ‘HomeBuilder’ scheme which would grant $25,000 to eligible singles who earn up to $125,000 and couples earning $200,000, can contribute at least $150,000 and are planning to build or renovate homes between June and the end of December 2020; New COVID-19 restrictions for restaurants (with Judith Lucy); Mining company Rio Tinto apologised after it blasted a 46,000 year old Aboriginal sacred site in Western Australia, which provided a 4,000-year-old genetic link to present-day traditional owners, to expand an iron ore mine (with Adam Briggs); Reported auction clearance rate figures fudged to appear resistant to the COVID-19 pandemic; Economic effects of asylum seekers (with Luke McGregor).
101	8	"Episode 8"	Clementine Ford, Tony Martin, Zoe Norton Lodge	Ronny Chieng	(none)	17 June 2020	517,000
Topics: Current affairs show 60 Minutes broadcast derogatory comments Victorian Labor MP Adem Somyurek made about Gabrielle Williams and Marlene Kairouz, and the current affairs show alleged Somyurek was also involved in branch stacking; China warned its citizens not to travel to Australia, and cautioned Chinese students about racist incidents during the COVID-19 pandemic when returning to Australia for study or choosing to study in Australia; Netflix removed four of Australian actor Chris Lilley's shows, where he portrayed ethnic characters, from its streaming service following Confederate statues in the US being torn down or vandalised by Black Lives Matter protesters; Concerns for media freedom were raised after the Chief Executive of Philippine news website Rappler, Maria Ressa, was convicted of cyber libel over a 2012 article that linked a businessman to illegal activities; Statues of Captain James Cook, and the bronze busts of John Howard and Tony Abbott were among the monuments vandalised amid the global Black Lives Matter protests as critics argue the monuments failed to recognise historical violence and inequalities; A 14 year-old autistic and non-verbal boy named William Callaghan became lost while hiking with his father on Mount Disappointment and was found using a special search strategy tailored to his needs; A recent analysis from The Australia Institute found the Morrison government’s stimulus packages are “disproportionately” weighted to create new jobs in male-dominated industries despite women-dominated industries hit hardest by the COVID-19 pandemic; Feminism (with Judith Lucy and Clementine Ford); A report from advisory firms Alpha Beta and Illion revealed the Morrison government’s COVID-19 Early Release of Super scheme, which enabled Australians to withdraw $20,000 of superannuation funds over two years to assist with financial hardship during the pandemic, triggered spending on non-essentials such as gambling, alcohol and takeaway food, while analysts warned the scheme will erode future retirement savings and compounding returns; Discussing the Australian racehorse Fine Cotton (with Tony Martin).
102	9	"Episode 9"	Michael Rowland, Lisa Millar, Tommy Little	(none)	Andy Zaltzman	24 June 2020	553,000
Topics: A spike of COVID-19 infections in Victoria raised concerns of a second wave of the pandemic and the state’s premier Daniel Andrews claimed several infection clusters have been traced to separate families across multiple households; A Perth man, Cooper Allin, was denied entry into Scarborough tequila bar El Grotto for his mullet hairstyle which sparked debate on dress codes in pubs; The western Himalayan border dispute between China and India escalated after Indian soldiers clashed with Chinese troops that resulted in casualties on both sides, as India and China blamed each other for the serious violation of a consensus reached by the two countries; US President Donald Trump blamed his low attendance numbers at the Tulsa, Oklahoma, rally on young people using social media, who encouraged people to register for the event but not attend; Queensland MP Bob Katter appeared on the lawn of Parliament House dressed as the Grim Reaper to protest the death of Australia’s car industry and called for a re-establishment of an Australian car manufacturing industry despite Holden announcing its departure from Australia several months ago and the closure of the last local Holden manufacturing plant in 2017; Australia-UK trade negotiations (with Andy Zaltzman); Novak Djokovic, his wife and three other tennis players were tested positive for COVID-19 and will remain in self-isolation for 14 days, after they played in a series of exhibition matches Djokovic organised in Serbia and Croatia without physical distancing amid the COVID-19 pandemic; Twitter introduced fact checking hyperlinks on its platform to reduce the spread of disinformation and misinformation but Facebook founder Mark Zuckerberg refused to follow suit and said social media sites should not be the ‘arbiters of truth’; Discussing Australian cricket player David Boon (with Tommy Little).
103	10	"Episode 10"	Patricia Karvelas	(none)	(none)	1 July 2020	501,000
Topics: ABC chairwoman Ita Buttrose wrote a strongly worded letter to Communications Minister Paul Fletcher about the Morrison government's handling of its multimillion-dollar ABC budget cuts and accused him of lying about the national broadcaster's efforts to collaborate with SBS (with The Weekly team); Australia and New Zealand defeated Colombia by 22 votes to 13 at the FIFA Council meeting in Zurich to win their historic joint bid to host the 2023 FIFA Women's World Cup, and making it the first FIFA Women's World Cup to be held in the Asia-Pacific region; A Reuters tally based on government reported data, recorded more than 10 million COVID-19 cases globally as confirmed infections in Victoria reached double digits daily; New Zealand reported two confirmed COVID-19 cases in more than three weeks after two women from the same family travelled from the UK and through Australia to New Zealand to visit a dying parent without being tested, and the country’s Ministry of Health blamed its policy of granting compassionate exemptions to its quarantine rules; Australian singer Guy Sebastian was criticised on social media for not representing struggling artists during the COVID-19 lockdowns when he appeared at Prime Minister Scott Morrison’s announcement of the $250 million arts package at a press conference; Minister for Families and Social Services Anne Ruston said a News Corp report was “factually incorrect” for reporting the JobSeeker payment will increase by $75 a week to become $715 a fortnight, which was the preferred option of some cabinet ministers; Scott Morrison told 2GB radio that he received anecdotal feedback from small and large businesses that unemployed Australians are not working because the JobSeeker payment is too generous; The departure of Labor’s Mike Kelly led to the 2020 Eden-Monaro by-election to be held on 4 July 2020 with the Liberals 2019 candidate Fiona Kotvojs and Labor’s selection of a former local mayor Kristy McBain as frontrunners; An independent inquiry by the High Court of Australia found former Justice of the High Court of Australia Dyson Heydon allegedly sexually harassed six young female associates with further allegations from senior legal figures of predatory behaviour by Heydon; The economic effects of the Arts in Australia (with Luke McGregor).
104	11	"Episode 11"	Shaun Micallef, Steve Sammartino, Celia Pacquola	(none)	(none)	8 July 2020	528,000
Topics: Premier Daniel Andrews announced Victoria will be under COVID-19 lockdown for six weeks after the number of new cases of infections reached triple digits daily in the past few days; Premier Daniel Andrews announced the closure of the border between Victoria and New South Wales following Victoria’s 127 new cases of COVID-19 in a single day and the death of a man aged in his nineties in a Victorian hospital; Residents living in nine public housing towers in the suburbs of Flemington and North Melbourne were placed under ‘hard lockdown’ to stop the spread of COVID-19 after 27 positive COVID-19 cases were found in the buildings; The Today show dropped One Nation leader Pauline Hanson as a “regular contributor”, after she described residents of public housing in Melbourne who are locked down due to COVID-19 as “drug addicts” who “cannot speak English”; Allegations that private security guards employed to monitor returned travellers under quarantine in hotels in Victoria had slept with guests, and they failed to follow rules for physical distancing and the use of personal protective equipment; The FBI arrested Ghislaine Maxwell in Bradford, New Hampshire, on charges she conspired with sex offender Jeffrey Epstein to sexually abuse minors, with allegations she helped Epstein groom girls as young as 14 years old, going back as far as 1994, and in some instances, Maxwell was present for and participated in the sexual abuse of minors; Photographs of Ghislaine Maxwell appearing with high profile identities including Donald Trump, Prince Andrew, and sex offenders Harvey Weinstein and Jeffrey Epstein resurfaced in the media soon after her arrest; The COVID-19 pandemic in the United States resulted in the move of the famous annual Nathan's Hot Dog Eating Contest from Coney Island to an undisclosed indoor location without spectators, where Joey Chestnut swallowed 75 wieners and buns in 10 minutes and Miki Sudo consumed 48 and a half in the same span, setting new world records for both the men's and women's events; The social and economic future of Australia after the worst of the COVID-19 pandemic passes (with Judith Lucy and Steve Sammartino); Federal Finance Minister Mathias Cormann announced he will resign as Finance Minister in the next few months and will not contest his senate seat at the next federal election; Labor's Kristy McBain officially claimed victory in the Eden-Monaro by-election, when her party secured the marginal seat after preferences flowed her way; Three-part documentary series Shaun Micallef’s On The Sauce which looks at Australia’s drinking culture (with Shaun Micallef); Every year, surveys show Australians’ trust in their politicians have reached record lows, whereas a Roy Morgan survey in April 2020 revealed trust in the retail sector emerged as Australia’s most trusted industry, with the supermarket sector in second place and consumer products came third, while sixth placed ABC was the only media broadcaster in the top ten; Rosehaven season 4 (with Luke McGregor and Celia Pacquola).
105	12	"Episode 12"	Adam Briggs, Judith Lucy, Luke McGregor, Ryan ‘Fitzy’ Fitzgerald, Ronny Chieng, Jessica Mauboy, Grant Denyer, Carrie Bickmore, Leigh Sales, Dave Hughes, Miranda Tapsell, Kevin Rudd, Chris Brown, Wil Anderson, Kitty Flanagan, Steve Vizard, Peter Helliar, Annabel Crabb, Nazeem Hussain, Jimmy Barnes	(none)	(none)	15 July 2020	642,000
Topics: The emergence of a COVID-19 cluster at the Crossroads Hotel in Sydney's south-west, which was so far linked to 21 confirmed COVID-19 cases, led to group bookings at pubs in New South Wales being reduced from 20 people to a maximum of 10, under new COVID-19 rules; Victoria Police fined 16 people a total of $26,000 for COVID-19 lockdown breaches, who were traced back to a birthday party after paramedics saw two men ordering 20 meals at KFC in Dandenong around 1:30am; Prime Minister Scott Morrison’s call that “We’re all Melburnians” in an attempt to unify Australians while Victorians faced COVID-19 lockdowns, was criticised after he was seen at a rugby league game in New South Wales while Victoria was in lockdown; Premier Daniel Andrews urged all Victorians to wear face masks when in public places, especially in situations where they cannot maintain physical distancing, as the state’s daily number of new COVID-19 cases reached 288; The re-opening of Florida’s Disney World on 7 July 2020 coincided with a sharp increase in confirmed COVID-19 cases in the state; Tom Gleeson announced his departure from The Weekly; “The 100th Dance”, a mini-docuseries to celebrate 100 episodes of The Weekly in 2020.
106	13	"Episode 13"	Julia Gillard	(none)	(none)	22 July 2020	665,000
Topics: NASA announced it never created a 13th zodiac sign called Ophiuchus as it existed more than 3000 years ago when the Babylonians split the zodiac into 12 equal parts with one constellation for each month of their 12-year calendar but deliberately omitted Ophiuchus; Princess Beatrice secretly married multi-millionaire property developer Edoardo Mapelli Mozzi at The Royal Chapel of All Saints at Royal Lodge, Windsor, with around 20 guests in attendance including Queen Elizabeth II, Prince Philip and close family, in accordance with all relevant government COVID-19 guidelines; Victoria Police fined a Melbourne construction worker $1652 for breaching COVID-19 lockdown rules after he was caught driving from Werribee about 30km southwest from Melbourne’s CBD, into the city, to buy “specific butter chicken”; Prime Minister Scott Morrison cancelled the first two sessions of parliament in Canberra and rescheduled the date to 24 August 2020 due to rising cases of COVID-19 community transmissions in Victoria and New South Wales; Chris Wallace received praise for his interview on Fox News Sunday with Donald Trump for fact-checking Trump's false assertion that the United States has the lowest COVID-19 mortality rate in the world and challenged Trump's assertion that Democratic candidate Joe Biden had agreed to “abolish” police funding as part of an alliance with Bernie Sanders; Channel Nine, Guy Sebastian and his younger brother Chris Sebastian faced criticism when Chris was named the winner of The Voice for dodging the "no family" rule which bans family of the show's staff from taking part and Guy Sebastian was a coach for contestant Johnny Manuel who lost to Chris; Scott Morrison and Federal Treasurer Josh Frydenberg announced that from the end of September 2020, JobKeeper will be extended until March 2021 and split into two tiers to avoid part-time workers getting huge pay rises, with the top tier payments reduced from $1500 to $1200 per fortnight, and the lower threshold will be determined by the number of hours worked; Josh Frydenberg announced JobSeeker's current $550 COVID-19 supplement which doubled the payment will end in September 2020 but then switch to a lower rate that will be more than the former Newstart payment; Premier Daniel Andrews announced that face masks will be mandatory for residents in Melbourne and Mitchell Shire as of 23 July 2020 due to the increased number of community transmissions and triple figures for daily cases of COVID-19; Women and Leadership: Real Lives, Real Lessons book (with Julia Gillard); The convergence of social media, online gambling and gaming is affecting people's health, as well as their wallets, during COVID-19 lockdowns where online social casino games and apps look, sound and play like gambling games, but they do not pay out real money and encourage players to connect with their online networks via social media; Modern Monetary Theory (with Luke McGregor).
107	14	"Episode 14"	Ronny Chieng	(none)	(none)	29 July 2020	561,000
Topics: Federal Treasurer Josh Frydenberg warned the debt and deficit level for Australia's economy resulting from the COVID-19 pandemic will be "eye-watering"; As Australia's population continues to fall, Josh Frydenberg called for Australians to have more babies in a bid to battle the country’s recession and help pay off the debt accumulated during the COVID-19 pandemic that is expected to be in the billions and to top $850 billion; Health and legal experts criticised a woman who refused to wear a face mask at a Bunnings warehouse in Melbourne where she filmed Bunnings employees asking her to wear a face mask in keeping with COVID-19 rules but she refused and claimed the store had no legal right to request she wear a mask; Three South Australian Liberal party ministers Stephan Knoll, Tim Whetstone and David Ridgway will leave their posts in Premier Steven Marshall's Cabinet and Upper House president Terry Stephens will also step down from his position over investigations in expenses and lodging Country Members' Accommodation Allowance claim forms; A second woman, Lizzy Rose, posted online footage of herself refusing to wear a mask at a Bunnings Warehouse in Maribyrnong; Mining magnate Clive Palmer's challenge to Western Australia's hard border closure was heard in the Federal Court and is heading to the High Court; Universal Music Group served copyright infringement papers to Clive Palmer over the use of Twisted Sister’s 1984 hit song "We're Not Gonna Take It" which Palmer used in his political campaign for United Australia Party without paying licence fees but he claimed that copyright should not apply to the chorus of the song as it was “derived” from the Christmas carol "O Come, All Ye Faithful"; Monetising and commercialisation of tertiary education in Australia (with Judith Lucy); A parliamentary committee report released in June 2020 claimed that without urgent government intervention, koalas will become extinct in New South Wales before 2050, with at least 5,000 koalas dead in recent bushfires and more than 80 per cent of some habitat areas destroyed; Economic effects of immigration in Australia (with Luke McGregor); Discussing Alan Bond (with Ronny Chieng).

=== Season 7 (2021) ===
No. overall	No. in season	Title	Featured guest	International correspondent	Original release date	Australia viewers (millions)
109	1	"Episode 1"	Zoe Coombs Marr, Nina Oyama, Pia Miranda, Colin Lane, Richard Pyros, Dave Thornton, Nick Maxwell	None	3 February 2021	577,000
Topics: Labor leader Anthony Albanese announced his cabinet reshuffle; Neo-nazi organisation National Social Network helped to organise a group of about 38 young white men who paraded Nazi symbolism, set fire to a cross and shouted racist slogans in the Grampians region in Victoria over the Australia Day weekend in January 2021; Australia's players criticised Australia cricket head coach Justin Langer for his management style and feel drained by Langer's "intensity and mood swing" after Australia fell to a 1-2 Test series defeat to India for a second consecutive time in less than two years; Western Australia entered a five-day lockdown with immediate measures introduced based on health advice to limit the spread of COVID-19 after a hotel quarantine worker who also worked as an Uber driver tested positive to COVID-19; A duck affectionately named 'Duck' was seen surfing at a popular surfing spot in Coolangatta trying to catch some waves; Collingwood president Eddie McGuire refused to resign after the release of a scathing report which found the AFL club had a culture of "structural racism" under his leadership and McGuire said the report’s release was a "historic and proud day for the Collingwood Football Club"; Victorian Liberal MP Kevin Andrews lost pre-selection for the seat of Menzies to commando-turned-barrister Keith Wolahan at a pre-selection ballot of members on Sunday 31 January 2021; The Week in Work: Commuting to work (with Zoe Coombs Marr); The Week in the World (with Nina Oyama); The Week in Sport: Bernard Tomic's girlfriend Vanessa Sierra received criticism after she uploaded a video to YouTube showing their time in hotel quarantine in Melbourne and she said she never washes her own hair and the hotel food was not always to her liking so she often ordered Uber Eats (with Nick Maxwell); The National Wastewater Drug Monitoring Program receive samples of wastewater to detect traces of COVID-19 and helps them target lockdowns to specific areas; Dinner with the Dead: Charlie Pickering travels back in time to discuss the swearing in of Joe Biden as the 46th President of the United States with deceased US Presidents George Washington, Abraham Lincoln, Richard Nixon, Franklin D. Roosevelt and John F. Kennedy.
110	2	"Episode 2"	Nina Oyama, Frank Woodley, Professor Heidi Drummer (Program Director for Disease Elimination and virologist)	None	10 February 2021	507,000
Topics: Victorian Department of Health confirmed a hotel quarantine worker tested positive to COVID-19; Gay conversion therapy was banned in Victoria after the bill passed parliament in a late night sitting following a marathon 12 hour debate; At the age of 43, Tom Brady became the oldest American football player to win the Super Bowl after steering the Tampa Bay Buccaneers to a 31-9 victory over the Kansas City Chiefs to win his seventh Super Bowl; Two men broke into the Airport West Sexyland store using a pole and stole a life-sized sex doll that goes by the name of "Kitty" which retails for up to $4500 and also stole multiple vibrators collectively worth about $10,000 in the robbery; At least six cars were involved in a collision after a koala made a dash across Adelaide's South Eastern Freeway and it brought peak-hour traffic to a standstill while a volunteer from Adelaide Koala Rescue rescued the koala; Crown Resorts was deemed unsuitable to operate a new Sydney casino at Barangaroo after a year-long public inquiry which exposed allegations of money laundering; Eddie McGuire steps down as Collingwood president following the release of a report into systemic racism at the club and the furore around the press conference when he called it a "proud day for the Collingwood Football Club"; Australia postponed their Test cricket tour to South Africa due to concerns of the COVID-19 outbreak in South Africa accelerated by a new variant said to be more contagious than earlier strains of the virus; The Week in the World (with Nina Oyama); How Trump's lies about the US election being "stolen" and "fraud" contributed to misinformation and incited the US Capitol insurrection; Convincing the public to take the COVID-19 vaccine to reduce catching and spreading COVID-19 (with Frank Woodley and Professor Heidi Drummer).
111	3	"Episode 3"	Margaret Pomeranz, Zoe Coombs Marr, Barrie Cassidy	Francesca Fiorentini	17 February 2021	554,000
Topics: South Australia closed its borders to Victoria due to hotel quarantine worker testing positive to COVID-19; Texas lawyer Rod Ponton appeared before a judge as a cat, after being unable to change a video filter while using Zoom, and declared "I'm not a cat" during a hearing in Presidio county, south-west Texas; Food regulators classed fruit juice as less healthy than diet cola under new guidelines confirming Australian health star ratings on food packaging will focus more on sugar content, which fruit growers and dieticians opposed due to fruit juice being high in natural sugar but has more nutrients than soft drinks; Australia fell behind many other countries for immunising its population against COVID-19 due to its slow vaccine rollout, supply shortage and mismanagement and vaccine hesitancy; Victoria goes into a 5-day lockdown due to another outbreak at a quarantine hotel; The Week in TV: Holey Moley (with Margaret Pomeranz); Pet theft is on the rise due to the COVID-19 pandemic bringing on loneliness in isolation and more people remote working; Lunar New Year celebrated around the world for the Year of the Ox; The Second impeachment trial of Donald Trump failed and Trump was acquitted (with Francesca Fiorentini); The first doses of the Pfizer COVID-19 vaccine arrived in Australia as more than 142,000 doses of the Pfizer/BioNTech COVID-19 vaccine touched down at Sydney Airport; Tabloid media reported the Duke and Duchess of Cambridge will welcome a fourth baby soon; Tabloid media announced The Duke and Duchess of Sussex are expecting their second baby; Scott Morrison criticised for lacking empathy after his comment on Brittany Higgins's interview with The Project about her rape allegations in parliament, using his daughters as a way to empathise; Google says it will shut down its search engine in Australia if it is forced to pay news outlets for content, after Scott Morrison said that Google profits from linking to news providers so it should pay for the journalism; The Week in Work: Casualisation of the workplace and a rise in Centrelink payments (with Zoe Coombs Marr and Barrie Cassidy).
112	4	"Episode 4"	Natalie Tran, Jimmy Barnes, Casey Donovan, Clare Bowditch, Tripod, Eddie Perfect, Tim Rogers, Jackie Barnes	Andy Zaltzman	24 February 2021	474,000
Topics: Facebook banned publishers and Australian users from sharing and viewing news content on its website in response to the proposed news media code that makes Facebook pay for news content; Facebook lifted its ban on Australians viewing and sharing news on its platform after it struck a deal with the Australian government on legislation that would make digital giants pay for journalism; NASA's Perseverance Rover landed on Mars; Buckingham Palace announced that Prince Harry and Meghan Markle will no longer serve as working members of the royal family; Jane Malysiak became Australia's first recipient of the Pfizer COVID-19 vaccine; Scott Morrison claimed he did not know about Brittany Higgins's alleged rape in Parliament House despite the publication of text messages that appeared to show his office was told of the incident soon after it took place; Liberal Party backbencher Craig Kelly resigned from the Liberal party to sit on the crossbench; Justin Timberlake made a public apology to Janet Jackson and Britney Spears for the way he treated them earlier in his career and how he "benefitted from a system that condones misogyny and racism"; Debris from a United Airlines plane fell onto the ground during an emergency landing after one of its engines burst into flames and suffered engine failure; Scottish singer Nathan Evans sings sea shanties on TikTok which go viral (with Natalie Tran).
113	5	"Episode 5"	Vidya Rajan, Greg Larsen, Frank Woodley, Wendy Walls (Lecturer of Landscape Architectural Design)	None	3 March 2021	459,000
Topics: Opposition Leader Zak Kirkup conceded defeat to Premier Mark McGowan in WA’s election two weeks before polling day, insisting he is taking a "dignified" approach and not "taking voters for mugs" following polls showing 68 percent support for Labor and 32 percent for Liberal in two party preferred results; New South Wales government sent the Queensland government a $30 million tax invoice for Queensland residents who quarantined in Sydney, which the Deputy Premier Steven Miles happily ripped up in front of news cameras at a media conference; Scott Morrison received an anonymous letter attached to a detailed statement from a woman alleging a man who is currently a cabinet minister raped her in 1988 before he entered politics and she has since committed suicide, while two unnamed current cabinet ministers are facing legal action over alleged workplace bullying of a former staff member; South Australian Liberal MP Nicolle Flint announced she will quit politics and not contest her seat of Boothby and spoke openly about being stalked, harassed and her electoral office was egged and vandalised several times with obscene slogans; Attorney General Christian Porter revealed at a media conference that he was the unnamed man who alleged raped a woman in 1988 before he entered politics and he denied the alleged rape and denied having any knowledge of the now closed police case; Tabloid media TMZ reported Lady Gaga's dog walker was shot multiple times and her two French bulldogs were stolen which prompted Lady Gaga to offer a $50,000 reward for her dogs' return, and a few days later both her bulldogs were returned unharmed and her dog walker was expected to make a full recovery after the attack; The Week in TV: Married At First Sight (with Nick Maxwell); Trump made his first appearance at the CPAC since losing the US presidency to Joe Biden, where he continued to make false claims of election fraud; The Aged Care Royal Commission released a damning report into the extent of the substandard care in the system finding many of the system's failings are due to poor governance from successive governments' cuts to funding; Scott Morrison was criticised for not answering questions at a media conference on the same day he tabled a report in response to the Royal Commission's Aged Care Commission report and gave journalists insufficient time to read his report; Australia's netball team The Diamonds lost to the New Zealand Silver Ferns 49-44 in game one of the Constellation Cup with news that The Diamonds decided to abandon a single captain in favour of a group leadership approach (with Vidya Rajan); Tobacco giant Philip Morris pushed the Australian government to legalise vaping which resulted in Greg Hunt abandoning plans to ban the importation of vaping devices (with Greg Larsen); A 45 year old Indian man, Thangulla Satish, was stabbed to death by his own rooster after attaching a three inch knife to the rooster's leg for an illegal cockfight; The Week in Science: The Urban heat island (with Frank Woodley and Wendy Walls).
114	6	"Episode 6"	Bert LaBonté, Costa Georgiadis, Zoe Coombs Marr	None	10 March 2021	510,000
Topics: The Canberra Times reported that Chief of Defence Force Angus Campbell told female trainee officers to avoid the "four As" - Alcohol, Out After midnight, Alone and Attractive to ward off sexual predators, but Opposition Leader Anthony Albanese said the focus should be on changing the behaviour of men rather than women; Linda Reynolds did not deny she called alleged rape survivor and former Liberal Party staffer Brittany Higgins "a lying cow" in the same room where the alleged rape occurred; Elon Musk’s private aerospace company SpaceX continued his efforts to take tourists in a spaceship to the Moon and Mars, with the launch of Starship SN10 which rose ten kilometres into the air and landed safely before exploding; Italy says its decision to block 250,000 doses of AstraZeneca COVID-19 vaccine destined for Australia was "not a hostile act" but was needed in its country as cases of infection and deaths increased due to failure of the company producing AstraZeneca to fulfill orders of the vaccine to Italy; Two million Australians watched Meghan and Harry's bombshell interview with Oprah Winfrey that revealed shocking racism claims about the colour of baby Archie's skin; A Royal Investigation began into allegations of Meghan Markle bullying her staff in 2018; A survey from market research group Utting found that one in four West Australians want their state to secede from the rest of Australia with the number of COVID-19 cases falling as Western Australia closed its borders to be increasingly isolated from the rest of the country; Burger King’s campaign for International Women's Day backfired as its attempt to draw attention to the male-dominated culinary world was criticised for being sexist after the UK chain of Burger King published the phrase "women belong in the kitchen" in a full page advert in The New York Times and on Twitter, to launch a new scholarship programme which will help female Burger King employees pursue their culinary dreams; Liberal MP for Wentworth Dave Sharma celebrated International Women's Day by giving pink flowers to female commuters at his local train station and was criticised for the performative gesture while the Liberal Party was dealing with rape allegations in Parliament house from Brittany Higgins and Christian Porter faced rape allegations in a historical sex crime case; Buckingham Palace responded to the racism accusations made by Meghan Markle in the interview with Oprah with a statement saying "The issues raised, particularly that of race, are concerning. Whilst some recollections may vary, they are taken very seriously and will be addressed by the family privately"; British television personality Piers Morgan quit the show Good Morning Britain after saying he did not believe what Meghan Markle said about considering suicide and getting no help from the palace; The Week in Work: The Gig Economy (with Zoe Coombs Marr).
115	7	"Episode 7"	Margaret Pomeranz, Michael Rowland, Mick Molloy, Dave Hughes, Laura Tingle, Lisa Millar, Dilruk Jayasinha, Angie Kent, Virginia Trioli, Kitty Flanagan	None	17 March 2021	544,000
Topics: Scott Morrison announced 800,000 half priced flight tickets to Australia's popular domestic tourist locations to support the tourism and aviation industries during the COVID-19 pandemic; Australians may need to wait longer for their COVID-19 vaccination as the federal government's vaccine rollout could extend beyond its October 2021 target while research revealed that 125,000 people were vaccinated so far which is far below the target of 4 million vaccinated people; Greg Hunt was admitted to hospital with suspected COVID-19 infection; The Seven Network confirmed it parted ways with The Chase Australia presenter Andrew O'Keefe following domestic violence, assault charges and a provisional apprehended violence order placed upon O'Keefe after an incident involving his partner, Dr Orly Lavee; The fallout following Harry and Meghan's interview with Oprah Winfrey continued as speculation grew over which member of the Royal Family made the racist comments about baby Archie's skin colour with Prince William saying the Royals are "very much not a racist family"; ABC electoral analyst Antony Green called the WA State election for Labor just 42 minutes after counting began with just 0.7 per cent of the vote counted and Green said the McGowan Government had won a second term in power; The Week in TV: Inside the World's Toughest Prisons (with Margaret Pomeranz); Thousands of protesters across the country rallied at March 4 Justice demanding change to the sexist and misogynistic treatment of women in the workplace and Brittany Higgins, the former Liberal staffer whose rape allegations sparked a national discussion about the workplace culture at Parliament House, spoke at the women's rally in Canberra; Scott Morrison in parliament responded to the March 4 Justice rallies and said some marches are "being met with bullets" which sparked further outrage regarding violence against women; The UK-based neo-Nazi group Sonnenkrieg Division, was formally listed as a terrorist organisation for the first time in Australia, and it will become an offence to be a member of the group, fund the group, or in some circumstances associate with members of the group, while penalties can range to up to 25 years in prison; Pope Francis refused to bless same-sex unions and called homosexuality "a sin and a choice"; The Federal Government continued to roll out the AstraZeneca COVID-19 vaccine despite other countries putting a total stop to the AstraZeneca vaccine including Germany, France, Spain, Italy, Ireland, The Netherlands, Denmark, Norway, Iceland and Bulgaria due to deaths from blood clots after receiving the AstraZeneca vaccine; Fisk (with Kitty Flanagan).
116	8	"Episode 8"	Zoe Coombs Marr, Tom Gleeson, Michael Rowland	Andy Zaltzman	24 March 2021	510,000
Topics: New South Wales Police Commissioner Mick Fuller announced a sexual consent app to record consent in a bid to reduce sexual assaults as consent can no longer be implied so technology can be used to formalise the habit, but the sexual consent app was criticised for not directly addressing the issue and Mick Fuller conceded it was the worst idea he had all year; ASIO removed at least a dozen spies who were accused of trying to infiltrate the Australian government that included spying on current and former politicians, foreign embassy staff and the police; US President Joe Biden called Russian President Vladimir Putin "a killer" and Putin will "pay the price", after a U.S. intelligence assessment concluded Putin authorised efforts to interfere in the 2020 US presidential election, but Putin suggested he and Biden continue discussions live, online and without anything pre-recorded; More than 18,000 people were evacuated from their homes in New South Wales as heavy rains and major flooding continued to inundate the state, causing some areas to resemble "inland seas"; The Week in TV: Married At First Sight recap (with Nick Maxwell); An anonymous whistleblower leaked graphic images of sex acts inside Parliament House to Ten News and said a small group of staffers set up a Facebook Messenger group which enabled them to share images and video of the lewd acts which included one that showed a man sitting at a desk, exposing himself next to a copy of the Parliament House rulebook and in another video, a man points to the desk of a female Liberal MP before performing a solo sex act on it (with Tom Gleeson); Scott Morrison dodged questions during a media conference about sexual misconduct in Parliament House following leaked images and videos of Liberal Party staffers involved in sex acts; the federal government announced JobKeeper to support businesses during the COVID-19 pandemic lockdowns yet some businesses reported a boost in profits when they applied for JobKeeper to retain staff but Josh Frydenberg said businesses have no obligation to pay back the money (with Michael Rowland); the UK 2021 Census revealed the country experienced the biggest population decline since 1941 (with Andy Zaltzman); Buckingham Palace considered hiring a diversity officer following claims of racism regarding baby Archie's skin colour in Meghan Markle and Harry's interview with Oprah; The Week in Work: Lesbians in the workplace (with Zoe Coombs Marr).
117	9	"Episode 9"	Nath Valvo, Nazeem Hussain, Howard Langmead (Vicar at St. Paul's Caulfield North), Dr Samuelson Appau (Senior Marketing Lecturer)	Andy Zaltzman	31 March 2021	575,000
Topics: A Melbourne man known simply as Brian Mc who claimed to be part of the LGBTQIA+ community, started a petition to change the name of the much loved Golden Gaytime ice-cream as he says the name of the ice cream, is "outdated" and "offensive" and is calling for the term "gay" to be banished from its title, however, a counter-petition was created to keep the name and called the ice-cream "iconically Australian" and "deserves to be celebrated" with its name intact as it was possibly the only positive representation of the word "gay" in Australian culture for quite some time; The grounding of Ever Given, a container cargo ship which blocked The Suez Canal for six days; Scott Morrison appeared on A Current Affair to claim he did not know about the alleged rape of Brittany Higgins and other sexual misconducts in Parliament House; Queensland Liberal MP Andrew Laming was forced to personally and publicly apologise to two women whom he trolled and harassed on Facebook, and it was revealed he took photographs of a woman's bottom with her underwear exposed while she was bending over, leading to Laming taking 30 days medical leave for empathy training and he claimed he will resign from politics at the next federal election in 2022; The Week in TV: Antiques Roadshow (with Nath Valvo); The Jobkeeper scheme, which was designed to help businesses continue trading by subsidising wages for Australian workers during the COVID-19 lockdown period, ended this week with 150,000 people expected to be unemployed; Daryl Somers said Hey Hey It's Saturday would not survive the cancel culture climate and Kamahl who was a regular guest on the show admitted he felt humiliated by a number of racist skits on the variety show, but fellow cast member John Blackman dismissed Kamahl's concerns and suggested Kamahl should have "let it go by now"; Scott Morrison reshuffled his cabinet, moving Peter Dutton from Home Affairs to Defence, Linda Reynolds moved from Defence to Government Services and Attorney-General Christian Porter who was on medical leave, takes on Industry, Science and Technology, and Stuart Robert moved from Government Services to Employment, Workforce, Skills, Small and Family Business; Scott Morrison announced a new cabinet taskforce on women's equality, safety, economic security, health and wellbeing, to be co-chaired by Morrison and the Minister for Women, Marise Payne; Independent senator Rex Patrick met Australian Uyghurs in front of Parliament House to call out China's repression of the ethnic minority in Xinjiang but the Coalition and Labor blocked an attempt by Senator Patrick to push through a Senate motion that would have recognised the Chinese government's actions against the Muslim minority as "genocide"; China strongly denied allegations of human rights abuses in the western Chinese province of Xinjiang, however, the United States administration has described the persecution of the Uyghurs as genocide as have Canada’s Parliament and the Dutch Parliament; some schools in Victoria banned Easter eggs for hygiene and allergy reasons; The Week in Religion: Easter (with Nazeem Hussain, Howard Langmead and Samuelson Appau).
118	10	"Episode 10"	Tony Armstrong, Frank Woodley, Matthew Ruby (Lecturer in the Psychology of Food Choice),	None	7 April 2021	543,000
Topics: Australia's vaccine rollout was delayed with Australia ranked 90th out of 100 countries where around three percent of Australia's population was vaccinated compared to sixty percent in the UK, but Scott Morrison blamed the slow rollout on supply shortage; Brazil's Christ the Redeemer statue got a facelift before it turns ninety years old in October and more than forty people worked on the makeover including engineers, architects and geologists; The Week in TV: Studio 10 (with Nick Maxwell); Ninety million sterile fruit flies were released from a low-flying fixed wing aeroplane across 11 outbreak areas in metropolitan Adelaide across a 10-week period to combat ongoing fruit fly outbreaks in the metropolitan area, where the sterile flies will breed with the wild flies, meaning they cannot reproduce and therefore breaking the breeding cycle; A Royal expert named Princess Anne as the person who questioned Prince Harry and Meghan Markle about baby Archie's skin colour; The Egyptian Royal Mummy parade featured twenty two mummies that were moved through the streets of Cairo from their current home the Museum of Egyptian Antiquities to the National Museum of Egyptian Civilisation with the mummies transported in protective cases nested one inside the other and loaded onto military flatbeds which are decorated to look like the funerary barges that carried pharaohs to their tombs; Tony's Terrible News (with Tony Armstrong); Victoria Police's right to disconnect was won in the union's recent negotiations which directs managers to respect leave and rest days and avoid contacting officers outside work hours, unless in an emergency or to check on their welfare, with the aim to shift the "always-on" culture so that officers can switch off from work after they have finished their shift; Australia and New Zealand's Trans-Tasman Travel Bubble agreement will begin on 19 April 2021; The NSW government appointed Malcolm Turnbull to the Net Zero Emissions Board but dumped him a week later due to Turnbull's support to freeze coal mining approvals; New research from The Australia Institute shows the majority of Australians support both a government policy subsidising the purchase of new electric vehicles and a ban on the sale of new fossil fuelled cars by 2035; The Week in Science: Insects as food (with Frank Woodley and Matthew Ruby).
119	11	"Episode 11"	Margaret Pomeranz, Natalie Tran	None	14 April 2021	551,000
Topics: Rapper DMX and Prince Philip died this week; The AstraZeneca COVID-19 vaccine is no longer available to people aged under fifty but they may choose to take the vaccine after consulting a doctor; Scott Morrison responded to the National Inquiry into Sexual Harassment in Australian Workplaces a year after it was left sitting on his desk and said "we agreed wholly in part or in principle" to supporting the fifty-five recommendations in the sexual harassment report; The side effects and some deaths of the AstraZeneca COVID-19 vaccine included blood clots, in particularly rare brain blood clots but medical experts said the risks are less than being struck by lightning or being attacked by a shark, while many Australians are waiting for the twenty million doses of Pfizer COVID-19 vaccine which were ordered but won't arrive in Australia until the end of 2021; US President Joe Biden said "enough prayers, time for action" following two more mass shootings in the US, in Boulder, Colorado where ten people were shot dead and in Atlanta, Georgia where eight people, including six Asian-American women were shot, and Biden unveiled a series of executive actions to address gun violence in the United States in his first major action on gun control since taking office; The slow rollout of the COVID-19 vaccine continues as blood clots and more deaths from taking the AstraZeneca vaccine prompted Chief Medical Officer Brendan Murphy to confirm the AstraZeneca vaccine as highly effective against COVID-19 and safe for people over the age of fifty; The Australian Federation Guard fired forty-one rounds from six M2A2 105mm howitzer ceremonial guns, in 10-second intervals, to honour Prince Philip, who died at the age of 99, with flags are flying at half-mast across the country and Australians were invited to sign an online condolence book via the Prime Minister and Cabinet's website; The Week in TV: Too Hot to Handle (with Margaret Pomeranz); 60 minutes featured General Manager of Seven Queensland Ben Roberts-Smith during his time as an Australian Army soldier whose lewd behaviour and alleged war crimes in Afghanistan came under scrutiny in light of an independent inquiry into "questions of unlawful conduct concerning (Australia's) Special Operations Task Group in Afghanistan", and Roberts-Smith denied all allegations and sued The Age, Sydney Morning Herald and Canberra Times for defamation; Former Australia Post chief executive Christine Holgate said she was "bullied and humiliated" out of her job and she believed the board, led by its chair, Lucio Di Bartolomeo, unlawfully stood her down from her role because Scott Morrison had ordered it, after Holgate admitted she purchased four Cartier watches valued approximately around $20,000 in total as gifts for senior management executives who secured a lucrative deal with three Australian banks; Scott Morrison scrapped Australia's COVID-19 vaccine target where the federal government projected that four million people would be vaccinated by March 2021 and the entire country inoculated by October due to the goal unlikely to be reached, as more doses of the Pfizer COVID-19 vaccine touched down in Sydney; Scott Morrison blamed the slow vaccine rollout in Australia on vaccine supply shortages and strict export controls introduced by the European Commission which meant Australia received just 700,000 of a contracted 3.8 million doses of the AstraZeneca vaccine; The Morrison government were criticised for placing added pressure on GPs and pharmacies to administer COVID-19 vaccinations rather than state-run mass vaccination centres as a political stance to avoid dealing with state premiers, which led to GPs being inundated with calls for the vaccine but there were no vaccines available as supplies did not arrive; Aged Care Minister Richard Colbeck was questioned over the aged care sector’s vaccine rollout failures and outbreak mismanagement, where residents in aged care facilities were ready to be vaccinated but there were no staff to administer the vaccine and doses were dropped of without needles or vials; The Week in Sport: Greg Norman (with Nick Maxwell); The Week in the Internet: How novice investors took on Wall Street by buying up shares of US video games retailer GameStop, which many hedge funds had seen as a losing bet, but the video game retailer's shares jumped from being worth less than $20 each at the end of December 2020 to nearly $350 by the end of January 2021 (with Natalie Tran).
120	12	"Episode 12"	Kamahl, Nath Valvo	None	21 April 2021	530,000
Topics: Sydney dance troupe 101 Doll Squadron, whose performance at the launch of the new $2 billion navy ship HMAS Supply in Woolloomooloo was panned as inappropriate, have blamed coverage by the ABC and other media for making them feel "threatened" and "unsafe", after footage of the routine went viral, and they singled out the ABC for what they called "deceptive editing" while the troupe performed in front of stony-faced dignitaries at the launch; US President Joe Biden announced he will withdraw all remaining US troops in Afghanistan by September 2021; Almost two thirds of Japan's citizen's said in a survey that the Tokyo Olympics should be cancelled or postponed and nearly all respondents to the survey, or 92.6 percent said they are concerned about the further spread of COVID-19 and a "fourth wave" of the deadly disease, however, Tokyo Olympics chief said the games will not be cancelled; Prince Philip's funeral honoured his legacy of service to Crown and country where his coffin was transported in a dark green Land Rover which led the funeral procession from Windsor Castle to St George's Chapel, and Prince William and Prince Harry were in the procession with their cousin Peter Phillips walking between the two brothers; The Week in TV: Antiques Roadshow (with Nath Valvo); New Zealand Prime Minister Jacinda Ardern announced The Trans-Tasman travel bubble between Australia and New Zealand would begin on 19 April 2021, and residents of both countries will be able to travel freely between each, without needing to quarantine for two weeks; Virgin Australia CEO Jayne Hrdlicka announced a major COVID-19 recovery plan to reach one hundred per cent capacity by the end of the calendar year in the aftermath of crippling COVID-19 restrictions, with several aircraft and 220 cabin crew set to return to the skies; The Morrison government's Respect Matters campaign featured hundreds of videos designed to form part of sexual assault teaching and sexual consent in schools, was criticised by sexual assault prevention campaigners for using examples related to tacos, milkshakes and going for a swim as it "trivialised a serious issue, was concerning, confusing and fell well short of the national standards"; A review by an independent expert panel which was commissioned by Australia's Therapeutic Goods Administration found MDMA and psilocybin or "magic mushroom" may show promise for therapeutic use, and could potentially be used to treat treatment-resistant mental illnesses but only if they were used in closely supervised clinical settings, with intensive professional support; Former Minneapolis Police officer Derek Chauvin, who knelt on George Floyd's neck for more than nine minutes in 2020 was found guilty of all three charges against him in one of the most consequential trials of the Black Lives Matter era, and he was convicted of second-degree unintentional murder, third-degree murder and second-degree manslaughter as the jurors deliberated for more than ten hours over two days before coming to their decision; The three remaining rebel clubs from the failed European Super League project, Barcelona, Real Madrid and Juventas released a joint statement responding to UEFA launching disciplinary proceedings against them which could lead to their expulsion from the UEFA Champions League despite all three clubs committed to the controversial breakaway Super League.
121	13	"Episode 13"	Nina Oyama, Luke McGregor	None	28 April 2021	544,000
Topics: Scott Morrison and UK Prime Minister Boris Johnson announced an in-principle agreement on the Australia-UK Free trade agreement but negotiators will spend the next six months finalising the text; Dozens of stranded Australians in India say they are frustrated about the Morrison government’s strict caps on returning travellers that prevent them from coming home, with stranded Australians forking out thousands of dollars on flights trying to come home from India say they were ripped off by airlines refusing to hand back their money, and others were stuck in a cycle of forking out thousands of dollars on overpriced flights, only for those flights to be cancelled; The Morrison government promised to spend an extra $539.2 million on new "clean" energy projects, which Scott Morrison says will create 2500 jobs and drive down greenhouse gas emissions, just days before US President Joe Biden's climate summit, where forty leaders, including Morrison, will be asked to explain what they are doing to curb climate change, but several scientists and climate lobby groups are disappointed with the new spending and say it won't do enough to reduce carbon emissions; Two men were charged over the theft of a valuable Big Bird costume worth $160,000, which was taken from the Sesame Street Circus Spectacular at Bonython Park in Adelaide and then returned; Western Australia's Anzac Day commemorations were cancelled due to the three-day lockdown, but a man who staged a lone march through an empty Perth CBD on Anzac Day and revealed to be an anti-vaccine and COVID lockdown protester Michael Darby, was stopped by police for not wearing a mask as per Perth's lockdown rules and he did not receive a fine; The Week in TV: MasterChef Australia (with Nick Maxwell); Nomadland won the Best Picture Oscar at the 93rd Academy Awards which was scheduled two months late and held in a Los Angeles train station; Perth's three-day lockdown ends which was sparked by a returned traveller who tested positive for COVID-19 after leaving hotel quarantine; Ben Roberts-Smith stepped down from the role of General Manager at Seven Queensland to focus on legal matters to sue The Age, Sydney Morning Herald and Canberra Times for defamation; Leaked video emerged of Scott Morrison speaking at the Australian Christian Churches conference on the Gold Coast where Morrison revealed that he had sought a sign from God while on the 2019 election campaign trail, and that he had practised the evangelical tradition of the "laying-on of hands" while working in the role of prime minister, and he also described the misuse of social media as the work of "the evil one", in reference to the Devil, which raised concerns about Australia being a secular society where politics should not be driven by religion; On the eve of the Morrison government's COVIDSafe app celebrating its "first birthday", there were calls from critics to dump the app as it cost more than $10 million to create and at least $100,000 each month to run, and only detected seventeen COVID cases since it was launched; Former US director of national intelligence James Clapper backed a call by former Australian prime ministers Kevin Rudd and Malcolm Turnbull for a royal commission into the Murdoch media, saying Australia needs to take preventative steps to avoid any slide into "truth decay" and when Rupert Murdoch and Fox News are "disregarding facts and objective analysis and empirical data, it is insidious and dangerous to democracy"; The Morrison government fast tracked COVID-19 vaccinations for Australian athletes attending the Tokyo Olympics by giving them priority access to COVID vaccines, which was criticised by the aged care and disability sectors who have aged care and disability staff and residents still waiting for their vaccines; The Montague Street Bridge (with Nina Oyama); The Week in Economics: Aged care in Australia (with Luke McGregor).
122	14	"Episode 14"	Dane Simpson, Frank Woodley, Nicci Rossouw (CEO of Exaptec)	None	5 May 2021	490,000
Topics: US President Joe Biden marked his first one hundred days in office with sixty executive orders, primarily aimed at curbing the COVID-19 pandemic and dismantling many of former President Trump's policies, particularly on immigration, eleven new border facilities to get children out of Border Patrol stations with prison-like conditions that are not meant for minors, 200 million people vaccinated that doubled and surpassed its initial goal of 100 million COVID-19 vaccine doses in 100 days, and fifty-three percent approval rating; The Federal Court ordered Clive Palmer to pay $1.5 million in damages to heavy metal band Twisted Sister for copyright infringement over his political rendition of the metal track We're Not Gonna Take It, and in addition to the $1.5 million in damages, Palmer was also ordered to pay costs and to remove all copies of his song and the accompanying video from the internet; Australian Federal Police seized more than $80 million of liquid methamphetamine hidden in bottles of canola cooking oil shipped from Mexico to Melbourne; Scott Morrison announced Australia will invest $747 million in upgrading four key military training areas and ranges in the Northern Territory to defend the country’s interests and support greater engagement with the Indo-Pacific neighbours and allies, amid China’s increasing assertiveness in the region, with upgrades for Robertson Barracks, Kangaroo Flats, Mount Bundey and Bradshaw to enable the Australian Defence Force to conduct simulated training exercises and remain battle-ready; In a letter to staff on ANZAC Day, Home Affairs Secretary Mike Pezzullo warned "free nations again hear the beating drums and watch worryingly the militarisation of issues that we had, until recent years, thought unlikely to be catalysts for war", which followed a sharp deterioration in Australia's relationship with China and a rise in regional tensions over Taiwan; The Duke and Duchess of Cambridge released a family video on their Twitter account to thank the public for "10 years of support" they received as a family, to celebrate the couple's tenth wedding anniversary; Disgraced Liberal MP Andrew Laming who apologised for abusing women online and took photos of a woman's bottom without her consent, announced he was diagnosed with ADHD and claimed his "erratic actions were due to his medical condition"; Scott Morrison faced rising anger from some Indian-Australian community groups after he paused flights from India and then subsequently announced a travel ban with penalties including five years in prison and fines of up to $66,000, as many Australians stranded in India felt "abandoned, rejected and betrayed" by their own government; US President Joe Biden issued a statement "We followed bin Laden to the gates of hell – and we got him" to mark ten years since US Special Forces conducted a raid in Pakistan that resulted in the death of Osama bin Laden, the mastermind behind the September 11, 2001, terror attacks; Tasmanian Premier Peter Gutwein was re-elected in a majority for the third consecutive time, and he said it a "historic day" for the Liberal Party; The Week in TV: Sky News Oscar Report (with Nick Maxwell); Queensland's Deputy Premier Steven Miles called Scott Morrison a "c***" which caused a Labour Day crowd to erupt into laughter but Miles claimed he had stuttered and quickly corrected himself with the word "contrast"; The Week in the Country: Rural New South Wales Mouse Plague (with Dane Simpson); Bill and Melinda Gates announced their divorce after twenty-seven years of marriage, saying "we no longer believe we can grow together as a couple"; An instrument on NASA's Perseverance rover on Mars has made oxygen from the planet's carbon dioxide atmosphere; China launched an unoccupied module containing living quarters for three crew members on a permanent space station that it plans to complete by the end of 2022; SpaceX's Dragon capsule and the NASA Crew-1 mission it was carrying, safely returned to Earth after a trip to the International Space Station, with three American and one Japanese astronauts, and flew back in the same capsule named Resilience in which they launched from NASA's Kennedy Space Centre in November 2020; The Week in Science: Service robot (with Frank Woodley and Nicci Rossouw).
123	15	"Episode 15"	Luke McGregor, Nazeem Hussain, Zoe Coombs Marr, Greg Larsen	None	12 May 2021	488,000
Topics: The Morrison government revealed a $1.7 billion Budget pledge to reduce childcare costs and Labor said it was a "missed opportunity" to help more families and the government's policy excluded too many families, particularly many with just one child in care; The ABC filed its defence with the Federal Court against Christian Porter but it has not yet been made public, but Porter's lawyers have applied to keep the ABC's defence against his defamation case confidential, pending a hearing into whether parts of the defence should be struck out; Rockhampton's premier agriculture event, Beef Australia, saw 115,000 people attend the week-long event; Four men, aged 27, 29, 42 and 46, were arrested and charged with various offences relating to the targeted kidnapping of former Australian Test cricketer Stuart MacGill in Sydney last month, when he was allegedly forced into a car then driven to a property in Sydney's west where he was allegedly assaulted and threatened with a weapon and released about an hour later; New South Wales recorded a new case of COVID-19 for the first time in almost a month when a Sydney man aged in his 50s tested positive for COVID-19 but did not travel overseas and did not work in hotel quarantine or a health role, however, he visited a number of venues in Bondi and stores in Sydney's west; Debris from China's biggest rocket landed in the Indian Ocean with most of its components destroyed upon re-entry into the atmosphere, ending days of speculation over where the debris from the uncontrolled rocket would hit but drawing US criticism over lack of transparency; Vaccine hesitancy in Australia due to fears of blood clots from the AstraZeneca COVID-19 vaccine, and misinformation from anti-vaccine proponents contributed to the low rates of vaccinations despite availability of vaccines; Federal Treasurer Josh Frydenberg released Budget 2021, with a landmark package of around $3.4 billion of new measures to improve outcomes for women's safety, economic security, health and wellbeing in the 2021–22 Budget; The Week in Religion: Eid al-Fitr (with Nazeem Hussain); The Week in Work: Mental health in the workplace (Zoe Coombs Marr and Greg Larsen).
124	16	"Episode 16"	Tony Armstrong, Margaret Pomeranz	None	19 May 2021	516,000
Topics: The Morrison government stressed that projections of Australia’s borders reopening in mid-2022 are only "assumptions" and "not policy" as tourism and business groups criticised the mid-2022 border reopening, claiming Australia will be "left behind" as a "lost kingdom"; Former outback grazier Dexter Kruger becomes Australia's oldest man at age 111 years and 124 days and attributes his long lifespan to eating chicken brains and living a simple life; The New South Wales government applied for "urgent approval" to use a poison called Bromadiolone on farms, as part of a $50 million package to help regional areas deal with the mouse plague but scientists and ecologists are worried widespread use of the chemical could also kill pets, livestock and native wildlife; Labor said the Morrison government's Budget 2021 was "all announcement" and "no delivery"; On 13 May 2021, the Morrison government rushed through legislation allowing Australia to keep refugees in detention centres for the rest of their lives and was one of the first laws passed under new Home Affairs Minister Karen Andrews; Ellen DeGeneres decided to end her daytime talk show after the 19th season following reports the talk show host and her producers came under intense scrutiny about an allegedly toxic workplace; The Week in TV: MasterChef Australia, the dirtiest show on TV (with Nick Maxwell); Madame Tussauds waxwork museum removed the figures of Prince Harry and his wife Meghan Markle from its British royal family display, in response to the couple's announcement that they will be stepping back from royal duties; A major American energy pipeline faced a massive cyber-attack that caused the US to lose 1.2 million barrels of fuel a day and shortly after the attack, US intelligence found that the party responsible for the attack was from Russia; Channel 7 faced a backlash for airing a "tell all" interview with actor Craig McLachlan who a Melbourne magistrate found not guilty of seven indecent assault charges and six common assault charges relating to his alleged conduct towards four women while playing the starring role of Frank-n-Furter in The Rocky Horror Show during its 2014 season; Tony's Terrible News (with Tony Armstrong); Australia's cycling rates surged due to COVID-19 lockdowns, with a rise in bicycle sales as gyms were closed and public transport discouraged; The Week in TV: Big Brother Australia 2021 (with Margaret Pomeranz); Violence between Israelis and Palestinians continued, bringing the death toll to 45, as Israel carried out hundreds of airstrikes in Gaza and Palestinian militants fired rockets at Israeli cities.

=== Season 8 (2022) ===
No. overall	No. in season	Title	Featured guest	International correspondent	Original release date	Australia viewers (millions)
126	1	"Episode 1"	Tony Armstrong, Luke McGregor, Jan Fran	None	27 April 2022	460,000
Topics: Elon Musk will reportedly buy Twitter for $61 billion ($US 44 billion); Russia tests their nuclear missile named 'Satan 2'; cruise ships return to Sydney for the first time since the COVID-19 pandemic in 2020; Aged care, housing affordability, China's influence in the Pacific, and an anti-corruption body, along with a clash over boat turnbacks, were some of the highlights of the first election debate between Prime Minister Scott Morrison and Labor leader Anthony Albanese in Brisbane that was broadcast on subscription only channel Sky News and Anthony Albanese was declared the winner when 40 out of 100 undecided voters thought he won the first leaders' debate, 35 voters backed Scott Morrison and 25 people remained undecided; Eleven days into the election campaign, Anthony Albanese tested positive for COVID-19 during a routine PCR test and he campaigned from his home in Sydney where he was in isolation for seven days; Tony's Terrible News (with Tony Armstrong); Johnny Depp took the witness stand for the first time in his defamation case against former partner Amber Heard; Russian and Belarusian tennis players were banned from competing in the 2022 Wimbledon tournament due to Russia's war on Ukraine; Former Prime Minister John Howard replied "so what?" when asked about Opposition Leader Anthony Albanese not knowing the unemployment rate; Emmanuel Macron won France's presidential election, fending off a challenge from far-right candidate Marine Le Pen; Understanding the unemployment rate (with Luke McGregor); Election campaign advertising; Who do children think should be Australia's next Prime Minister? (with Jan Fran).
127	2	"Episode 2"	Laura Davis, Luke Heggie	None	4 May 2022	441,000
Topics: The Reserve Bank has increased interest rates for the first time in more than 11 years, with a 25-basis-point hike taking the cash rate target to 0.35 per cent; Kylie Minogue returned to Ramsay Street to film the final episode of Neighbours after the television drama series was axed after 38 years; Vladimir Putin reportedly had surgery for abdominal cancer; cost of living increased and rising inflation meant a head of iceberg lettuce would set customers back $5.50 which is more than a McDonald's cheeseburger or 10 pack of chicken nuggets from Hungry Jacks; Executives resigned from Sydney's Star Casino after an inquiry heard allegations of serious crime at the venue where there were allegations of money laundering, wide scale fraud and criminal infiltration at the casino; Former US president Donald Trump appeared to storm out of an interview with Piers Morgan after he was grilled for his response to losing the 2020 presidential election; Scott Morrison continued his election campaign in Western Sydney while Anthony Albanese launched his election campaign in Perth and the Labor Party’s campaign video began with Russell Crowe's voiceover saying “Australia, we can do better,”; Nominees for 'The Ricky Muir Award for the Obscure Candidates We Hope Will Hold the Balance of Power Largely for Our Own Entertainment': Topher Field for the Liberal Democrats in Tasmania and Independent candidate Max Dicks in Victoria; 'Joyful Strains'- Male Midlife Fitness Crisis (with Luke Heggie); UK's Tory Minister Neil Parish resigned after admitting he watched pornography twice in Parliament, and he said the first time was accidental after looking at a tractor website, but the second time, in the House of Commons, was deliberate; New Zealand's borders opened to international visitors from sixty countries for the first time in more than two years; Australian comedian living in London was unexpectedly trapped in New Zealand as borders closed due to the start of the COVID-19 pandemic (with Laura Davis); Russian neuroscientist Alexandra Elbakyan made more than 48 million journal articles, almost every single peer-reviewed paper every published, freely available online on her website Sci-Hub and refused to shut the site down, despite a court injunction and a lawsuit from one of the world's biggest publishers, Elsevier, saying "If Elsevier manages to shut down our projects or force them into the darknet, that will demonstrate an important idea: that the public does not have the right to knowledge".
128	3	"Episode 3"	Barrie Cassidy, Rhys Nicholson, Claire Hooper	None	11 May 2022	520,000
Topics: The Queen withdrew from the annual State Opening of Parliament in the UK for the first time since 1963 due to "episodic mobility problems" and Prince Charles conducted the proceedings in her place; Six-time grand slam champion Boris Becker was sentenced to two-and-a-half years in prison for flouting the terms of his bankruptcy in 2017 by illicitly transferring large amounts of money and hiding assets after he was declared bankrupt, according to the UK's Insolvency Service; Controversy emerged after a viral video showed Russian kindergarten children dressed as tanks, fighter jets, military persons and medics with the infamous Z symbol for the Victory Day Parade, the anniversary of the defeat of Nazi Germany in 1945; Defence Minister Peter Dutton and Shadow Defence Minister Brendan O'Connor faced off in a debate at the National Press Club over issues including the recent security pact between China and Solomon Islands and the Morrison government's decision to cancel a $90 billion contract with France; Treasurer Josh Frydenberg debated his independent challenger Monique Ryan at the Sky News Australia Kooyong People’s Forum; The second leaders' debate which was broadcast on Channel 9 between Scott Morrison and Anthony Albanese was described as a shambles and embarrassing due to the leaders shouting over each other and ignoring the moderator Sarah Abo with 51 percent of undecided voters supporting Albanese and 49 percent backing Morrison; A group of Neo-Nazis met in a Melbourne beer hall to celebrate Hitler's birthday with a birthday cake decorated with a swastika while performing Nazi salutes; Media on Trial: Ethan 'Hiccups' Hall (with Nick Maxwell); Plans for the Queen's Platinum Jubilee celebrations revealed Prince Andrew and Harry and Megan Markle will not join the Queen and other family members on the Buckingham Palace balcony; Story Time: Anna Jarvis, the founder of Mothers' Day (with Claire Hopper); Criticism of journalists covering the election grew as too much focus was placed on 'gotcha' questions while important issues were ignored; Cassidy's Canberra Nights: Paul Keating versus John Hewson (with Barrie Cassidy); Political Candidates Fashion Choice: Scott Morrison versus Anthony Albanese (with Rhys Nicholson); The Palmer Foundation is a private philanthropic entity set up and headed by Clive Palmer which included promoting his name and logo on 33 million doses of hydroxychloroquine that he donated to the Australian medical stockpile in 2020 as a potential treatment for COVID-19 which was soon shown to be ineffective as a remedy for COVID-19; Bronze plaques and artworks stolen from Elwood and St Kilda included a sundial provided by local children’s author Celeste Walters, to delight children travelling to and from school along Elwood Canal; Nominees for 'The Ricky Muir Award for the Obscure Candidates We Hope Will Hold the Balance of Power Largely for Our Own Entertainment': Kate Fantinel for the Liberal Democrats in Western Australia and Elvis Sinosic for the United Australia Party in New South Wales.
129	4	"Episode 4"	Luke McGregor, Nazeem Hussain, Margaret Pomeranz, Peter Khalil, Max Dicks	None	18 May 2022	523,000
Topics: Scott Morrison changed his pitch to voters and promised to change his ways while describing himself as a bulldozer; Ukraine won the 2022 Eurovision Song Contest by a landslide, with Kalush Orchestra finishing 193 points ahead of its competition for its folk-hip-hop performance of the song 'Stefania'; Madonna teamed up with digital artist Beeple to jump on the NFT bandwagon and created three digitally animated pieces of artwork that involved a 3D scan of the 63-year-old singer's vagina and depictions of her giving birth to trees, butterflies, and centipedes; Greg Norman was criticised when he appeared to downplay the murder of Saudi journalist Jamal Khashoggi ahead of his new Saudi-backed LIV Golf professional series at a LIV Golf event at Centurion Club in St. Albans, England, by saying "This whole thing about Saudi Arabia and Khashoggi and human rights, we've all made mistakes and you just want to learn by those mistakes and how you can correct them going forward"; Interior designer Darren Harrison, who had no prior experience as a pilot, was with another passenger when flying back from a fishing trip in the Bahamas when their pilot experienced a medical emergency and passed out and Harrison safely landed the plane by talking to air traffic controllers; Labor leader Anthony Albanese made the $1-an-hour pay rise for the nation's lowest paid workers on the minimum wage a core part of his election campaign to tackle the cost of living pressures and spruiking the line "the price of everything has been going up, except your wages"; Lukenomics: Inflation in Australia (with Luke McGregor); A one trillion dollar Cryptocurrency meltdown resulted in huge crashes that wiped out the price Of Bitcoin, Ethereum, BNB, XRP, Cardano, Solana, Terra’s Luna And Avalanche; El Salvador's President Nayib Bukele announced his government will build a seaside 'Bitcoin City' at the base of the Conchagua volcano which would provide geothermal energy for the city and Bitcoin mining; The Queen made a surprise public appearance during the Queen's Platinum Jubilee celebrations by attending events including music performances, parades from the King's Regiment and arrived in her classic Range Rover escorted by a parade of horses as she slowly made her way out of the backseat with the aid of a walking stick; Peter Dutton revealed a Chinese spy ship was seen near a secretive naval facility off Western Australia and he denied claims that he made the revelation to stoke national security fears and to woo votes ahead of the federal election on 21 May 2022; Anthony Albanese responded to Scott Morrison describing himself as a bulldozer by saying "A bulldozer wrecks things, a bulldozer knocks things over. I'm a builder, that's what I am. And if I'm elected Prime Minister, I'll build things in this country."; The Whiteness of Australian political parties (with Nazeem Hussain and Peter Khalil); In 2021, Netflix paid just $868,000 in tax in Australia, despite estimates it raked in hundreds of millions of dollars from subscribers in the country; 'Byron Baes' on Netflix (with Margaret Pomeranz); Winner of 'The Ricky Muir Award for the Obscure Candidates We Hope Will Hold the Balance of Power Largely for Our Own Entertainment': Max Dicks.
130	5	"Episode 5"	Roy and HG, Leigh Sales	None	25 May 2022	549,000
Topics: Anthony Albanese defeated Scott Morrison in the 2022 Australian federal election to become the 31st Prime Minister of Australia; Peter Dutton became the nation's next opposition leader after Scott Morrison announced he would step down as he conceded election defeat; North Korea announced that an unspecified number of people in Pyongyang tested positive for the Omicron variant and called the outbreak the state's "most serious emergency" which raised concerns as the country previously has no reported vaccines, very limited COVID-19 testing capability, a terrible medical system and widespread poverty; Craig McLachlan dropped his defamation proceedings against the ABC, Nine Newspapers and Christie Whelan Browne on the day the defence case was set to begin and he will pay the defendants' court costs after abandoning the hearing on its 10th day; The first cases of Monkeypox appeared in Australia after two men, one from NSW in his 40s and one from Victoria in his 30s, both of whom had separately returned from Europe, have presented with mild symptoms consistent with Monkeypox; During his election campaign, Scott Morrison accidentally knocked over and flattened junior soccer player Luca Fauvette in Tasmania, while he was playing a training game with children at the Devonport City Strikers Soccer Club when he made contact with seven year old Luca who emerged unscathed; The television networks used all manner of new and advanced technology to provide definitive breaking and scrutinised election results including Channel Seven's 'Screen of Dreams' and computer graphics to determine when seats are won and lost such as Seven's 'Popping the Canberra Bubble' and Channel Nine's animated robot playing April Sun in Cuba on the ukulele; Former Prime Minister John Howard joined the Liberal Party campaign trail around the country, lending his support to vulnerable MPs in marginal seats but some questioned why it was all about a former leader and not the party's current leader, Scott Morrison; US President Joe Biden congratulated Anthony Albanese over the phone following Albanese's election win but an early morning phone call from singer Jimmy Barnes at 3:29AM was left unanswered; Former Prime Minister Scott Morrison held one last intimate party with close family and friends at Kirribilli House on his final day as the leader of Australia and was seen cracking a whip while his wife Jenny served a tray of margaritas as well as canapes; Ariarne Titmus broke the women's 400 metre freestyle world record at the Australian Swimming Championships in Adelaide when her time of 3:56.40 beat Katie Ledecky's old record by 0.06 seconds; Manchester City won their fourth English Premier League title in five years after defeating Aston Villa 3-2 at home on the final day of the season; The French Open (with Roy and HG); Mobile phone addiction in Australia; UK Prime Minister Boris Johnson claimed there were no lockdown parties and he never attended any parties at Downing Street during the nationwide lockdowns until photographs emerged showing him toasting and drinking alcohol at a party during nationwide lockdown but he denied he attended any lockdown party when questioned in parliament and denied he lied to parliament over lockdown parties; 2022 post-election review and leaving The 7.30 Report (with Leigh Sales).
131	6	"Episode 6"	Geraldine Hickey	None	1 June 2022	526,000
Topics: A woman with a baby was reportedly escorted from the courtroom after she yelled out that Johnny Depp was the father of her child while the court was on a morning break during the Johnny Depp vs. Amber Heard defamation trial; Vladimir Putin reportedly has "rapidly progressing cancer", is losing his sight and has been given three years to live by doctors, according to a Russian intelligence officer, as an FSB Russian Federal Security Service officer said Putin was very ill with "a severe form of rapidly progressing cancer"; The Captain Cook statue beside the Cairns thoroughfare of Sheridan Street was taken down from its roadside perch at the northern entrance to the regional city and the block of land is slated to become a James Cook University teaching hospital; Opera Australia posted a massive $22.5 million loss after widespread cancellations caused by lockdowns and border closures played havoc with the company’s bottom line and it was mostly offset by COVID-19 handouts from federal and state governments worth more than $21 million which prompted a root-and-branch review of the country’s largest performing arts organisation;A mass shooting occurred at Robb Elementary School when an 18 year old gunman crossed the grounds of the school in Uvalde, Texas, without being confronted and entered the building through an unlocked door, then killed 19 children and two teachers. Police confirmed the gunman was barricaded inside a classroom at Robb Elementary School for an hour before a tactical team finally breached the room and fatally shot him; Three days after a mass shooting at Robb Elementary School in Uvalde, Texas left 19 children and two adults dead, the National Rifle Association kicked off its annual convention about 280 miles away in Houston, where thousands of people protested for gun control; Texas Republican senator Ted Cruz was heavily criticised after suggesting schools would be safer if there were fewer exits and if more armed officers were stationed in school buildings, following the mass shooting at Robb Elementary School, and he did not appear to comprehend the fact reducing the number of exits in a school building would pose an even greater safety risk, as well as a significant fire hazard; More than a dozen sitting or ex-Liberal Party MPs, advisors and officials anonymously spoke to The Saturday Paper and blasted ex-PM and ex-Party Leader Scott Morrison with expletives, and particularly slammed his willingness to defend transphobia and his last-minute flawed superannuation policy; Four decades after the Swedish pop supergroup ABBA last performed live, audiences were again able to watch ABBA onstage in an innovative digital concert where the voices and movements were the real Agnetha Fältskog, Björn Ulvaeus, Benny Andersson and Anni-Frid Lyngstad but the performers onstage are digital avatars, dubbed 'ABBA-tars'; A self-published romance novelist Nancy Crampton Brophy, who once wrote an online essay called 'How to Murder Your Husband', was convicted of second-degree murder and sentenced to life in gaol on 25 May 2022 following a seven-week trial, for murdering her husband Daniel Brophy, four years ago; Following their election loss, Peter Dutton was elected unopposed as the Liberal Party's new leader, with Sussan Ley to serve as deputy and David Littleproud was elected leader of the Nationals, defeating former leader Barnaby Joyce and Victorian MP Darren Chester in a party room vote; Senior Labor MP Tanya Plibersek apologised for comparing Liberal MP Peter Dutton, to Harry Potter's archenemy, Voldemort, just days before Dutton was announced as the new Liberal Party leader; In his first press conference after resigning as Home Affairs minister to become Liberal Party leader, Peter Dutton tried to show his softer and blokey side and said it was nice to be able to "smile" and "show a different side" to when he was the minister responsible for border protection but many people remain unconvinced; Greens MP-elect for Brisbane, Stephen Bates had to complete a few more shifts at his retail job before he is sworn-in as a member of Federal Parliament in Canberra because he said "the rent doesn’t pay itself"; Winner of the Most Outstanding Show at the 2021 Melbourne International Comedy Festival and new show at the Sydney Opera House (with Geraldine Hickey); UEFA Champions League finalist Liverpool asked for an investigation into the issues faced by its fans in the lead up to the UEFA Champions League final against Real Madrid, when the kickoff to the final was delayed by more than half an hour with UEFA citing 'security reasons' as police outside the ground fired tear gas at a small number of supporters who tried to climb over security barriers; Concerns and opposition to the prolific promotion of gambling through sport, especially related to potential negative effects for children, adolescents, young men and problem gamblers is growing and research into online sports betting advertising suggests it can shape gambling attitudes, intentions and behaviours, and impacts most negatively on existing problem gamblers and sports bettors.
132	7	"Episode 7"	Margaret Pomeranz	Andy Zaltzman	8 June 2022	451,000
Topics: Scott Morrison finally moved out of Kirribilli House thirteen days after his election loss with two huge trucks hauling his family's belongings back to the suburbs; The New South Wales government chased people for their unpaid hotel quarantine bills, with $58.6 million yet to be settled; Wait times to renew or apply for a new passport have ballooned to 12 weeks, despite the official recommendation from the Australian Passport Office instructing applicants to allow up to six weeks; Federal Government promised to act on rising gas and electricity costs; Australian monuments including the Australian War Memorial and Sydney Harbour Bridge were illuminated in royal purple to mark the Platinum Jubilee year, the 70th anniversary of The Queen’s accession to the throne; The White House was illuminated in orange to honour National Gun Violence Awareness Day, as the nation was shaken by recent mass shootings, with other government buildings including California's Capitol Dome and New York City Hall also lit up in orange; Johnny Depp won his defamation case against his former wife Amber Heard after a jury found that a statement that Ms Heard made about domestic abuse in a 2018 opinion piece clearly referred to the actor, and jury members awarded Depp $US10.35 million in damages but also awarded Heard $US2 million in damages as the jury found she was defamed by a lawyer for Depp; Fourteen year old Harini Logan spelt 21 words correctly during a 90-second spell-off against Vikram Raju, beating Raju by six to win the National Spelling Bee title; The Queen made a public appearance for the Platinum Jubilee celebrations and was seen during the Trooping the Colour and on the Buckingham Palace balcony with members of the Royal Family; 'Lux Listings Sydney' on Amazon Prime Video (with Margaret Pomeranz); Spanish MotoGP rider Aleix Espargaró missed out on a podium finish at the Catalonia Grand Prix after thinking the race was over a lap before it ended, and Espargaró was in second place behind eventual winner Fabio Quartararo when he crossed the line on the second-to-last lap, then lifted off the throttle and started to wave to fans at the Barcelona-Catalunya Circuit then realised his mistake a few turns later and immediately went back to racing, finishing in fifth place; Rafael Nadal defeated Casper Ruud in straight sets to win his 14th French Open championship and 22nd Grand Slam title; Iga Świątek defeated Coco Gauff to win her second career Grand Slam title at the French Open; UK prime minister Boris Johnson narrowly survived a no-confidence vote by members of his Conservative Party but the outcome of the 211-148 result meant Johnson cannot be challenged from within the Conservative ranks for one full year (with Andy Zaltzman); Netflix in Australia; Ukrainian President Volodymyr Zelenskyy led his country in mounting an unexpectedly fierce resistance since Russia invaded Ukraine 100 days ago and released a video message every day since the war began, and he said no one expected his country to survive and world leaders advised him to flee "But they didn't know us, and they didn't know how brave Ukrainians are, how much we value freedom" he said.
133	8	"Episode 8"	Celia Pacquola, Luke McGregor, Ivan Aristeguieta	None	15 June 2022	557,000
Topics: Former federal treasurer Josh Frydenberg, who failed to hold his Melbourne seat of Kooyong in last month's election, was reportedly in talks with the AFL to replace outgoing CEO Gillon McLachlan; TV soapie Neighbours filmed its final episode after 37 years; Disgraced Prince Andrew reportedly pushed for a return to royal duties and wants his ceremonial role as Colonel of the Grenadier Guards reinstated and he lobbied the Queen for his former status to be restored and to be allowed back to official events alongside other royals; United States House Select Committee on the January 6 Attack to investigate the attack on the US Capitol with January 6th Attack public hearings being broadcast in prime time on free to air television; The ACT government decriminalised possession of small amounts of drugs including cocaine and heroin, and under new laws, anyone found with amount that falls within threshold will be fined, but not charged; Thailand became the first country in Southeast Asia to legalise the growing and possession of cannabis and allowed the consumption of it in food and drinks but new laws will not allow its recreational use; Prime Minister Anthony Albanese travelled overseas to discuss Australia's global dealings on climate change, and was keen to attend the Quad meeting in Tokyo for talks with US president Joe Biden, India's Prime Minister Narendra Modi and Japan's Prime Minister Fumio Kishida before returning to Australia to meet with New Zealand's Prime Minister Jacinda Ardern to discuss bilateral relations between Australia and New Zealand; Rebel Wilson announced in an Instagram post that she was in a same-sex relationship with fashion designer Ramona Agruma and she chose to announce her relationship with Agruma to pre-empt an article by Andrew Hornery of The Sydney Morning Herald which would have outed her; The NSW government promised to reduce childcare costs and increase the number of places and female work participation by spending $5 billion on the sector over the next ten years; Childcare Costs (with Celia Pacquola and Luke McGregor); McDonalds exited Russia in response to the invasion of Ukraine and announced it would sell all its restaurants in Russia which were later rebranded as Vkusno i tochka; Global markets plunged again as interest rate hikes fuel recession fears; Global cost of living increased (with Ivan Aristeguieta); Assets of Russian oligarchs continued to be seized to force Russia to withdraw from Ukraine and the proceeds from the seized assets would go to Ukraine; Vladimir Putin reportedly has a portable toilet and suitcase for his stool and urine when he travels overseas to hide any possible health problems; The Socceroos are on their way to their fifth consecutive world cup final after beating Peru in a 5-4 penalty shootout at the Ahmad Bin Ali Stadium in Doha, Qatar.
134	9	"Episode 9"	Margaret Pomeranz, Tony Armstrong, Jimmy Barnes	None	22 June 2022	436,000
Topics: An article in The Conversation labelled Bluey's dad Bandit as a bully and a bad dad; Netflix announced it will produce and stream a new reality competition series apparently based on the original series Squid Game called Squid Game : The Challenge which is set to offer the largest cash prize in reality TV history, $4.56 million, to one of its 456 competitors, the largest cast in reality TV history; Cosmetics company Revlon filed for Chapter 11 bankruptcy as it grappled with a cumbersome debt load and an inability to source a sufficient and regular supply of raw materials shipped from China; The AEMO pulled the plug on the wholesale energy market serving the eastern states because the process to order output became unsustainable so the energy regulator took over control to stop energy generators withdrawing their availability; President of Ukraine Volodymyr Zelenskyy met with President of France Emmanuel Macron, Chancellor of Germany Olaf Scholz, President of Romania Klaus Iohannis and Prime Minister of Italy Mario Draghi in Kyiv to continue and strengthen the defense of Ukraine, issues of economic support for Ukrainian citizens and post-war reconstruction, opportunities to counter the food crisis provoked by Russia, further sanctions pressure on Russia and Ukraine’s European future; The Russian government announced it is sanctioning a further 121 Australian citizens including journalists, business people and army officials from entering Russia with ABC chair Ita Buttrose, journalist and presenter Stan Grant, South Australian Premier Peter Malinauskas, News Corp co-chair Lachlan Murdoch and Defence Force chief General Angus Campbell on the list; UK Home Secretary Priti Patel signed an order to extradite WikiLeaks founder Julian Assange to the United States where he faces espionage charges; Australia claimed their first World Cup of Darts title in Frankfurt when Damon Heta and Simon Whitlock defeated Welsh duo Gerwyn Price and Jonny Clayton 3-1 in the final; Love in the Jungle on Amazon Prime Video (with Margaret Pomeranz); The Logies returned after a three-year absence and Hamish Blake won the Gold Logie for Most Popular Personality on Australian TV and the inaugural Bert Newton Award for Most Popular Presenter, and Tony Armstrong won the Graham Kennedy Award for Most Popular New Talent; Tony's Terrible News (with Tony Armstrong); US President Joe Biden fell off his bike after his foot got caught on the pedal while dismounting during a ride in a state park near his home in Rehoboth Beach, Delaware, and no medical attention was needed; Celebrating the 30th anniversary of the album Soul Deep with the release of Soul Deep 30 album and tour (with Jimmy Barnes).
135	10	"Episode 10"	Frank Woodley, Annie Louey, Costa Georgiadis, Luke Heggie, Dr. Denise Driscoll (Sleep Scientist from Eastern Health Sleep Laboratory)	Jena Friedman	29 June 2022	452,000
Topics: The 2021 Census revealed that people who identified as Christian has reduced from over 50 per cent (52.1 per cent) in 2016 and from over 60 per cent (61.1 per cent) in 2011, while almost 40 per cent (38.9 per cent) of Australia’s population reported having no religion in the 2021 Census, an increase from 30 per cent (30.1 per cent) in 2016 and 22 per cent (22.3 per cent) in 2011; Russia defaulted on its foreign debt for the first time since the 1918 Bolshevik revolution after international sanctions were imposed on Russia since it invaded Ukraine; Jerry Hall reportedly filed for divorce from billionaire husband Rupert Murdoch due to "irreconcilable differences" six years after the pair married; Airport chaos disrupted holiday plans of hundreds of thousands of Australians due to technical issues, wet weather, school holidays and staff shortages blamed for long queues, lost luggage, flight delays and cancellations; A four year-old bloodhound named Trumpet won the Westminster Kennel Club Dog Show defeating a French Bulldog, a German Shepherd, a Maltese dog, an English Setter, a Samoyed dog and a Lakeland Terrier to take the trophy; 'Joyful Strains'- Cost of Living (with Luke Heggie); The U.S. Supreme Court overturned the landmark 1973 Roe v. Wade ruling that recognised women's constitutional right to abortion, so abortion rights will be determined by states, unless Congress acts as nearly half of the states have or will pass laws that ban abortion while others have enacted strict measures regulating the procedure (with Jena Friedman); The Australian Bureau of Statistics released its 2022 figures showing 44,331 deaths occurred by 31 March 2022 and were registered by 31 May 2022, which is 6,609 (17.5%) more than the historical average; Cost of Dying (with Annie Louey and Costa Georgiadis); The Glastonbury Festival returned after a two-year break due to the COVID-19 pandemic with performances from Billie Eilish, Kendrick Lamar, Diana Ross and Paul McCartney took to the stage for a 'virtual duet' with former frontman John Lennon who was fatally shot in 1980 and featured surprise appearances from Dave Grohl and Bruce Springsteen alongside McCartney; Public health officials declared a national incident after routine surveillance of wastewater in north and east London found evidence of community transmission of poliovirus for the first time, when The UK Health Security Agency said waste from the Beckton sewage treatment works in Newham tested positive for vaccine-derived poliovirus in February and that further positive samples had been detected since; Toyota could end up paying more than $2 billion to customers as part of a class action that challenged the auto giant over faulty diesel particulate filters in some of its top-selling cars including the Toyota Hilux, Toyota Fortuner, Toyota Land Cruiser Prado that were sold between October 2015 and April 2020, alleging the faulty filters caused foul smoke to spew from exhausts, decreased fuel efficiency, and increased wear and tear on engines; Australia's COVID-19 death toll has passed 10,000 after more than two years since the pandemic began, and Australia also recorded over eight million cases of COVID-19 infections but those are only the confirmed cases that have been reported; Reports of sleep disturbances from people experiencing poor sleep during and following a COVID-19 infection has increased; Sleep deprivation (with Frank Woodley and Dr. Denise O'Driscoll); Roving security guards and hundreds of cameras protect a giant greenhouse in Armidale, NSW, which grows five tonnes of medicinal cannabis a year.
136	11	"Episode 11"	Felicity Ward, Roy and HG, Barrie Cassidy, Luke McGregor, Professor Bruce Mountain (Director of the Victoria Energy Policy Centre)	None	6 July 2022	475,000
Topics: Urban planners and water scientists have urged the New South Wales government to buy back thousands of homes in flood-prone areas of western Sydney, as overdevelopment sets a trajectory for the number of uninsurable houses in the city to surge; The Chinese government reportedly implemented cutting edge artificial intelligence to monitor the minds of dozens of Chinese Communist Party officials, when researchers in China claimed to have developed software that can analyse facial expressions and brain waves to monitor if subjects were attentive to 'thought and political education'; Airport chaos in Australia continued while eager travellers crowd the airports during the school holiday travel period as staff shortages led to flights being cancelled or delayed, long queues and check-in times, missing luggage; Guy Sebastian's former manager Titus Day was found guilty of embezzling around $900,000 of the money the singer claimed he was owed, after being managed by Day for more than a decade; Although Australia is not a NATO member, Prime Minister Anthony Albanese was invited to attend the Spain summit as part of a bid to reaffirm international support for Ukraine against Rusia’s invasion; Prime Minister Anthony Albanese welcomed a 'new start' in relations with France during a meeting with President Emmanuel Macron in Paris, after the acrimony around Australia's scrapping of the submarine deal with French builder Naval Group when the Morrison government tore up the contract in favour of nuclear-powered submarines under the AUKUS agreement; The January 6th Attack public hearings presented evidence from Cassidy Hutchinson, a former aide to former Chief of Staff Mark Meadows, and she testified that on 2 January 2021, Rudy Giuliani met with Meadows and then told her that "on January 6 we're going to the Capitol" while Meadows then told her "things might get real, real bad on January 6" which contradicted Donald Trump's claims that the insurrection was an unforeseen result of a small group of rioters who were acting independently of any direction from Trump officials; Northern Territory Day celebrations returned after a two-year break due to the COVID-19 pandemic; UK Prime Minister Boris Johnson said he was not aware of any "specific allegations" against Chris Pincher, after Pincher’s dramatic resignation as deputy chief whip following claims he groped two men at a private members' club, but the former top civil servant at the Foreign Office, Lord Simon McDonald, said Johnson's account was "not true" and the Prime Minister was briefed "in person"; Class system in the UK (with Felicity Ward); A toddler was in intensive care and a second child was hospitalised after they contracted the first cases of diphtheria of the throat in New South Wales in a century; South Australia recorded its first case of Monkeypox after a man who had travelled overseas tested positive for the virus and health authorities said there was no risk of transmission to the community; Cassidy's Canberra Nights: Bob Hawke versus Paul Keating (with Barrie Cassidy); Nick Kyrgios fought with the umpire, spectators and a line judge before ultimately winning the battle to scrape through to the second round at Wimbledon and there were unsavoury scenes following the final point of the match when Kyrgios could be seen spitting in the direction of a spectator when he became fed up with being verbally and racially taunted throughout the match; Wimbledon Championships (with Roy and HG); A Florida man, James Nix, spent 30 hours in prison and is facing a felony charge after he murdered his neighbour's rooster in what he called an act of self-defense; Power bill rises (with Luke McGregor and Professor Bruce Mountain).
137	12	"Episode 12"	Margaret Pomeranz, Luke Heggie, Corey White	Andy Zaltzman	13 July 2022	381,000
Topics: Elon Musk reportedly had secret twins in November 2021 with Shivon Zilis, an executive at Musk’s company Neuralink, bringing the number of known living children fathered by Musk to nine; The Festival of San Fermín began in Pamplona, Spain with the most famous event running of the bulls returning after a two-year break due to COVID-19 restrictions; Queensland Maroons won the State of Origin, defeating the New South Wales Blues 22-12 at Suncorp Stadium; UK Prime Minister Boris Johnson was forced to resign after an historic party revolt over a series of ethics scandals where nearly 60 members of his government resigned but Johnson insisted that he would continue as caretaker leader until the Conservative Party chooses a successor; Boris Johnson's resignation (with Andy Zaltzman); The ABC celebrates its 90th anniversary; The world paid tribute to Japan's former prime minister Shinzo Abe, who was fatally shot during a campaign event in Nara and was rushed to Nara Medical University Hospital after suffering cardio and pulmonary arrest but died soon after; The President of Sri Lanka Gotabaya Rajapaksa fled the country after protesters stormed his home and office and the official residence of his Prime Minister Ranil Wickremesinghe amid a three-month economic crisis that triggered severe shortages of food and fuel but Wickremesinghe as Acting President declared a countrywide state of emergency, imposed an immediate curfew in the western province and reiterated that he would not leave until a new government was in place; 'Joyful Strains'- Lettuce and other vegetables price rises (with Luke Heggie); Novak Djokovic defeated Nick Kyrgios and claimed a seventh Wimbledon men's singles title, and 21st grand slam title; The rising cost of lettuce did not affect a dugong named Pig who lives at Sea Life Sydney Aquarium even though lettuce is its entire diet; 'Who Can We Blame?'- Inflation (with Corey White); 1999 Australian republic referendum; Neighbours on 10 Peach (with Margaret Pomeranz).

=== Season 9 (2023) ===
No. overall	No. in season	Title	Featured guest	International correspondent	Original release date	Australia viewers (millions)
139	1	"Episode 1"	Michael Rowland, Rhys Nicholson, Margaret Pomeranz	None	8 February 2023	396,000
Topics:Argument outside Cardinal George Pell's funeral at St Mary's Cathedral between Pell's detractors and admirers; Tiny radioactive caesium-137 capsule goes missing and is later recovered on the Great Northern Highway in Western Australia; report on the 2023 Chinese balloon incident; Samuel Johnson criticises Molly Meldrum for exposing himself at Elton John concert; Senator Lidia Thorpe quits the Greens over disagreements with the party regarding the Indigenous Voice to Parliament referendum; The Greens are moving ahead with the first national plan to legalise cannabis (with Rhys Nicholson); The Reserve Bank of Australia lifted the interest rate to 3.35 percent and announced The Queen's face on the Australian five dollar note will not be replaced with King Charles's face; The Bachelors on Network 10 (with Margaret Pomeranz); Cancel culture (with Charlie Pickering).
140	2	"Episode 2"	Rhys Nicholson, Nina Oyama, Gabbi Bolt	None	15 February 2023	397,000
Topics: New Zealand Police recovered 3.2 tonnes of cocaine worth $NZ500 million ($AU450 million) from the Pacific Ocean believed to be bound for Australia; North Korea celebrated the 75th founding anniversary of the Korean People's Army; The General Synod of the Church of England said it will consider using gender neutral pronouns when referring to God; Based on a Spanish early release of Prince Harry's upcoming autobiography Spare, he lost his virginity when he was aged 17 to an older woman in a field behind a busy UK pub; 48-year old Leonardo DiCaprio falsely rumoured to be dating 19-year-old Israeli model; The NRL's 2023 season launch may be in jeopardy over pay and conditions with players threatening to strike during the premiership; Liberal Party leader Peter Dutton apologised for boycotting the National Apology to the Stolen Generations in 2008; Valentine's Day (with Gabbi Bolt); Cancel culture (with Charlie Pickering).
141	3	"Episode 3"	Jimmy Carr, Margaret Pomeranz	None	22 February 2023	443,000
Topics: Rising interest rates; The United States military shot down three more unidentified flying objects over North America; Finance minister Damien Tudehope forced to quit cabinet before NSW state election after discovery that he owns shares in Transurban, which controls most of Sydney's motorways; Former NRL player Terry Campese pulls out of NSW state election race after he was identified as having attended a risqué party while scantily clad; Numerous Russian oligarchs died in suspicious circumstances since the start of Russia's invasion of Ukraine, leading to speculation the deaths were ordered by Vladimir Putin; 'Terribly Funny' stand up comedy show (with Jimmy Carr); Bolivia prisoner serving 15-year sentence for homicide attempts escape dressed as a sheep; Report on Roald Dahl revision controversy; Below Deck Down Under on 7plus (with Margaret Pomeranz); Cancel culture (with Charlie Pickering).
142	4	"Episode 4"	Roy and HG, Alex Lee, Rhys Nicholson, Derryn Hinch	None	1 March 2023	398,000
Topics: Qantas; US President Joe Biden's secret visit to meet Ukrainian President Volodymyr Zelenskyy in Kyiv; NRL excluded from the 2023 Sydney Gay and Lesbian Mardi Gras parade following Manly pride jersey player boycott; A suggestion was made to replace the Pride Round in the NRL with a Respect Round and promote it as being inclusive (with Roy and HG); Two of NSW Premier Dominic Perrottet's brothers, Jean-Claude and Charles, summoned to give evidence at an inquiry into allegations of impropriety at a Sydney council, but they have not been located; High inflation, cost of living crisis, housing affordability and rental crisis (with Alex Lee); Jetstar passenger removed from flight "after repeatedly failing to follow instructions and was abusive towards the crew"; 'This is Apparently Your Life' (with Rhys Nicholson and Derryn Hinch); Superannuation reform; Cancel culture (with Charlie Pickering).
143	5	"Episode 5"	Peter Helliar	Julia Claire	8 March 2023	403,000
Topics: Shadow treasurer Angus Taylor claimed Labor broke an election promise by imposing the superannuation tax concession changes of 30 per cent, up from 15 per cent, for superannuation balances over $3 million and the Coalition will block the changes; The hosts of The Project, Waleed Aly and Sarah Harris, apologised to viewers for a punchline made by LGBTQIA+ comedian Reuben Kaye after the joke drew headlines and social media criticism as being offensive to Muslims and Christians; Ex-President Donald Trump released a new song called 'Justice for All' in collaboration with rioters imprisoned for their alleged involvement in the Capitol riot ahead of his keynote address at the annual CPAC; Florida Governor Ron DeSantis did not attend the CPAC amid growing tensions between him and ex-President Trump, while Republican presidential candidate Nikki Haley launched her campaign (with Julia Claire); Labor's Chris Minns launched his 2023 New South Wales state election campaign with Prime Minister Anthony Albanese; Australia Post warns its letter delivery revenue is in an "unstoppable decline" and said its losses related to letters soared 171.5 percent to $189.7million and Australia Post estimated the average Australian household will receive one letter or fewer a week by the end of the decade; The Reserve Bank governor Philip Lowe raised interest rates by 0.25 percent to 3.6 percent, making it the tenth consecutive interest rate rise since the general election in May 2022; King Charles evicted Prince Harry and Meghan Markle from their Frogmore Cottage residence in the UK and offered the home to his brother Prince Andrew; Artists including Elton John, Kylie Minogue, Adele, Harry Styles and Spice Girls declined an invitation to perform at King Charles's Coronation Concert on Sunday 7 May 2023 (with Peter Helliar); Cancel culture (with Charlie Pickering).
144	6	"Episode 6"	Rhys Nicholson, Rhonda Burchmore, Alexei Toliopoulos	None	15 March 2023	382,000
Topics: Independent MP Andrew Wilkie used parliamentary privilege to claim Hillsong Church breached financial laws in Australia and around the world relating to "fraud, money laundering and tax evasion" which followed the resignation of Hillsong's founder Brian Houston in March 2022, after an internal investigation found he behaved inappropriately towards two women, which prompted an independent review of the church's governance structure; After nine weeks of Robodebt Royal Commission hearings featuring more than 100 witnesses and former prime ministers Malcolm Turnbull and Scott Morrison and other ministers, the scheme was deemed fundamentally flawed by lawyers in 2014 as an algorithm was used to match welfare recipients' reported earnings with averaged income data from the tax office to allege overpayments, with little to no human oversight; Former Human Services minister Alan Tudge denied he was responsible for his department's failure to check the legality of the Robodebt Scheme despite his former media advisor Rachelle Miller telling the Robodebt Royal Commission that Tudge was aware of Robodebt victims' details being released to the media in a bid to deter them from speaking out; Two weeks away from the NSW state election the Premier Dominic Perrottet and Labor leader Chris Minns engage in another leaders debate to win the hearts and minds of undecided voters; 'This is Apparently Your Life' (with Rhys Nicholson and Rhonda Burchmore); Included in the 2023 Oscars Goodies Bag is a gift of ten square metres of the Aussie outback to the selected nominees along with 20 trees planted in their name, which comes courtesy of 'Pieces of Australia', a company premised on the purchasing of private land, which is then sold in "small parcels to people around the world," in an effort to protect from human development, deforestation, and other environmental threats (with Alexei Toliopoulos); Prime Minister Anthony Albanese said he planned to meet with US President Joe Biden in the United States following a meeting with Indian Prime Minister Narendra Modi in India, amid speculation he and Biden will make an announcement about Australia’s plans to build nuclear-powered submarines; Cancel culture (with Charlie Pickering).
145	7	"Episode 7"	Joanne McNally, Aleisha McCormack, Roy and HG, Tony Armstrong	None	22 March 2023	426,000
Topics: Former Prime Minister Paul Keating criticised the $368 billion AUKUS nuclear powered submarine deal and called it a mistake that does not offer a solution to the challenge of great power competition in the region against China or to the security of the Australian people and its continent; Saint Patrick's Day (with Joanne McNally); Transgender rights protesters clashed with neo-Nazis in Melbourne after the controversial UK figure Kellie-Jay Keen-Minshull held an event in the city where black-clad marchers made Nazi salutes in front of the Victorian parliament; A medication in managing Type 2 diabetes called Semaglutide works as an effective weight-loss medication promoted by social media influencers but the shortage has left people with diabetes struggling to find pharmacies with their diabetes medication in stock (with Aleisha McCormack); NSW Premier Dominic Perrottet revealed his gambling reforms has a cashless gaming card that will include spending limits as a state election commitment but Labor leader Chris Minns stopped short of supporting the card and wanted a trial to determine if it would have any impact on clubs and pubs; The International Criminal Court issued an arrest warrant for Russian President Vladimir Putin for alleged war crimes involving accusations that Russia has forcibly taken Ukrainian children and also issued a warrant for Putin's commissioner for children's rights, Maria Lvova-Belova; The issue was again raised about whether or not the AFL could bring in extra-time during the home-and-away season, following a draw between Richmond and Carlton; Canterbury Bulldogs star Max King implemented a sex ban with his model fiance, Christy Young, until later in the year so the couple could honour their Christian faith by remaining celibate until they are officially married; The BBC's decision to suspend broadcaster Gary Lineker from a long-running sports show after he tweeted criticism of the British government’s asylum policy, led to dozens of sports presenters and reporters walking out of their jobs in support of Lineker (with Roy and HG); 'Agony Armstrong' (with Tony Armstrong); Cancel culture (with Charlie Pickering).
146	8	"Episode 8"	Georgie Carroll, Rhys Nicholson, Luke Heggie	None	29 March 2023	446,000
Topics: Prime Minister Anthony Albanese announced the wording of the referendum question and draft constitutional amendment for the proposed Indigenous Voice to Parliament but Nationals leader David Littleproud said the release of the wording ahead of a referendum did not change his party's position in opposing The Voice and he believes the mention of 'Executive Government' in the design principles will give The Voice more power than sitting federal ministers; Opposition Leader Peter Dutton called for the solicitor-general's advice on the wording of The Voice referendum to be made public and said the Liberal Party had not made a decision about whether it would support The Voice but asked the government for more details; Chinese leader Xi Jinping visited Russian leader Vladimir Putin to reportedly act as a potential peacemaker of the Ukraine war during a two-day visit but US secretary of state Antony Blinken said "President Xi's trip to Russia days after the international criminal court issued an arrest warrant for President Putin, suggests that China feels no responsibility to hold the Kremlin accountable for the atrocities committed in Ukraine."; Broncos defeated the Dolphins 18-12 in an enthralling Brisbane NRL derby; Media mogul Rupert Murdoch announced he will marry for the fifth time at age 92 after becoming engaged to Ann Lesley Smith, months after his split from ex-wife Jerry Hall; Prime Minister Anthony Albanese unsuccessfully evaded the dreaded 'sausage shot' during his NSW election visit while devouring his Democracy sausage as he said "No-one ever looked good eating a sausage."; Labor leader Chris Minns led his party to an election win after 12 years in opposition in the NSW election and Dominic Perrottet stepped down as Liberal leader after conceding defeat; TikTok CEO Shou Zi Chew testified before US Congress amid a looming ban but his testimony increased the likelihood that Congress will take some action on the popular and controversial social media app after his remarks failed to allay bipartisan worries over potential data privacy issues and Chinese government intrusion; New South Wales nurses and midwives took industrial action to demand mandatory nurse-to-patient ratios and better pay and working conditions; the Nursing and Midwifery Council advised health practitioners via email against setting up profiles on OnlyFans but public policy experts claimed the email is unreasonable and amounts to "sex shaming" for health staff tackling the cost-of-living crisis and the fight for a pay rise (with Georgie Carroll); Five men from New South Wales were charged after allegedly organising a 'black flight' from Papua New Guinea to Sydney carrying 52 kilograms of Methamphetamine in duffle bags; Police arrested fugitive Mike Stipinovich, who was on the run for his role in a cocaine smuggling operation, after he ordered an Uber Eats under his own name, while hiding in a secret compartment beneath a spa at the back of a property in Western Australia; Protests against French President Emmanuel Macron raising the retirement age reached the most intense level yet as protesters hurled stones and launched fireworks at police who responded with tear gas; Finland took the number one spot on a list of the world's happiest nations for six consecutive years, according to the 2023 World Happiness Report, with Australia in 12th place in the Top 20 (with Rhys Nicholson); 'Joyful Strains'- Airbnb blamed for the longterm rental availability crisis (with Luke Heggie); Cancel culture (with Charlie Pickering).
147	9	"Episode 9"	Joanne McNally, The Lucas Brothers, Scout Boxall	None	5 April 2023	373,000
Topics: A 25-car train derailment spilt powdered clay and cases of beer beside a scenic western river in Paradise, Montana, leaving some cars off the tracks in a narrow, century-old tunnel with limited access; Former United States President Barack Obama and his wife Michelle arrived in Sydney for his speaking tour in Sydney and Melbourne, to discuss strength in leadership and techniques for navigating an unpredictable future; Gwyneth Paltrow won her court battle over a 2016 ski collision at a Utah ski resort after a jury decided that she was not at fault for the crash and the jury dismissed the complaint of a retired optometrist Terry Sanderson, who sued Ms Paltrow over injuries he sustained when the two crashed on a beginner run at Deer Valley ski resort; An Australian cultured meat start-up revealed a sphere of lab-grown meat, produced with a DNA sequence from the woolly mammoth and meant to be more sustainable than animal meat which might offer a glimpse into the future of food production; 'The Prosecco Express' standup comedy show (with Joanne McNally); Labor candidate Mary Doyle won a by-election in the federal seat of Aston in Melbourne's outer eastern suburbs following the resignation of former Liberal frontbencher Alan Tudge; Belgian-Dutch racing driver Max Verstappen won the 2023 Australian Grand Prix (with Scout Boxall); A man who set off a major police operation in north-west Sydney is behind bars after the AK-47 rifle he was allegedly carrying turned out to be a Bong, and the man was charged with possession of an unauthorised firearm and intimidation, which both carry a maximum penalty of five years in prison; Former US president Donald Trump was indicted over hush-money payments made to porn star Stormy Daniels ahead of the 2016 election and 34 felony counts relating to his business dealings; 'Headliners (USA)' standup in a comedy showcase (with The Lucas Brothers); Cancel culture (with Charlie Pickering).
148	10	"Episode 10"	Maisie Adam, Roy and HG, Margaret Pomeranz	None	12 April 2023	382,000
Topics: The Liberal Party leader Peter Dutton announced his party's formal opposition to the federal government's model for an Indigenous Voice to Parliament after a party room meeting in Canberra; Following the announcement of the Liberal party's opposition to the Indigenous Voice to Parliament, Ken Wyatt quit the Liberal Party over its decision to formally oppose the government's plan to enshrine an Indigenous Voice to Parliament in the Constitution while Shadow Attorney-General Julian Leeser quit the Liberal frontbench to support The Voice to Parliament; Queensland Police charged a man for allegedly removing a platypus from its habitat north of Brisbane and alleged the man took the platypus from a local waterway then travelled by train to Caboolture with a woman and had the mammal wrapped in a towel; Former US President Donald Trump pleaded not guilty to 34 felony counts at an arraignment in New York on charges related to alleged hush-money payments made to adult film star Stormy Daniels before the 2016 election; The US government officially banned TikTok on all government devices joining Canada, the United Kingdom, France, Belgium, Denmark, Norway and New Zealand over concerns of data privacy and Chinese government intrusion; Nine's political editor Charles Croucher told 'Weekend Today' he believed Scott Morrison would step down sometime between the federal budget in May and the end of the year, which could be a disaster for Liberal Leader Peter Dutton and he said "This is speculation that makes sense, given he is a former prime minister and former prime ministers tend to move on from the chamber and not sit on the back bench."; Protests continued in France over President Emmanuel Macron's decision in raising the retirement age from 62 to 64 with ratcatchers hurling dead rats at City Hall and violence on the streets; the Federal government issued a travel alert to warn anyone planning a trip to France should exercise a high degree of caution following violent protests and civil unrest; Easter celebrations (with Maisie Adam); Rupert Murdoch called off his engagement to Ann Lesley Smith after just two weeks reportedly due to Murdoch feeling uncomfortable with Smith's evangelical views; Spaniard Jon Rahm won the 2023 Masters Tournament at Augusta National Golf Club (with Roy and HG); Married at First Sight on Nine (with Margaret Pomeranz); Cancel culture (with Charlie Pickering).
149	11	"Episode 11"	Nath Valvo, Margaret Pomeranz, Dylan Moran	None	19 April 2023	390,000
Topics: People in the path of Severe Tropical Cyclone Ilsa were ordered to take shelter immediately after the cyclone intensified into a powerful category five system ahead of its final charge towards Western Australia's northern coastline; the International Monetary Fund expected Australia's economy is set to grow by just 1.6 per cent this year; RBA board member Ian Harper admitted the RBA did a terrible job as the COVID-19 pandemic began in Australia when the RBA reacted by cutting interest rates to a record low of 0.1 percent to keep money cheap to stimulate the economy and avoid a recession, but supply chain issues and the war in Ukraine saw prices skyrocket and cashed-up consumers were willing to pay the inflated prices which started the inflation problem; House rents are at a record high across all capital cities raising concerns that homelessness will rise if Australia's housing crisis is not addressed soon (with Nath Valvo); Reports confirm that Prince Harry will attend the Coronation of Charles III and Camilla without Meghan Markle and their children; New York City hired former teacher Kathleen Corradi to become the city's first 'Rat Tsar' to combat the rat infestation issue; Teletubbies reboot on Netflix (with Margaret Pomeranz); The Australian Taxation Office (ATO) revealed the largest HECS/HELP debts with one scholar accumulating over $700,000 in debt, and prompted The Greens spokesperson for Education and Senator for NSW Mehreen Faruqi to call for an urgent end to the indexation of HELP debts, and for the minimum repayment income threshold to be lifted in order to reduce the burden on students and graduates; 'We Got This' comedy show (with Dylan Moran); Cancel culture (with Charlie Pickering).
150	12	"Episode 12"	Kirsty Webeck, Rhys Nicholson, Anthony Albanese	Julia Claire	26 April 2023	399,000
Topics: The LIV Golf tournament in Adelaide erupted in wild scenes after Chase Koepka's stunning hole in one at the par-three 12th hole at The Grange Golf Club as Koepka and his caddie celebrated with an animated chest bump while a swarm of beer cups thrown by jubilant spectators rained down upon them; Thousands of people from around the world visited Exmouth, Western Australia to watch the total solar eclipse which lasted 58 seconds and the next total solar eclipse will be on 22 July 2028, and be visible in parts of Western Australia, the Northern Territory, south-west Queensland and New South Wales; Federal treasurer Jim Chalmers released a review of the Reserve Bank of Australia and outlined a major overhaul of the Reserve Bank including removing its power to set interest rates, with the responsibility being allocated to a "monetary policy board" that will meet eight times a year instead of monthly to allow more time to consider issues, a separate "governance board" with an external chair appointed to oversee strategy, finances, staff planning and risk management, but it would have no role in monetary or payments policy or financial stability; Buckingham Palace announced King Charles III and Queen Camilla chose a "Coronation Quiche" which contains spinach, broad beans and tarragon as the dish for the upcoming coronation ceremony; Elon Musk's SpaceX Starship rocket exploded in less than four minutes into the flight and failed to separate as designed, after launching from Texas and received cheers from officials but SpaceX described the event as a "rapid unscheduled disassembly before stage separation"; Australian sherbet confectionery Wizz Fizz celebrated its 75th anniversary; 420 Day was celebrated in San Francisco after a two-year hiatus due to the COVID-19 pandemic with changes including regulated and tested cannabis to be sold for the first time at the event and only people aged 21 and over would be allowed at the celebration; Just Stop Oil activists held a slow march by walking slowly in front of vehicles from Delancey Street to Chalk Farm to disrupt traffic in Camden Town in north London during rush hour which left commuters very angry and the protest was observed by police but officers did not intervene (with Kirsty Webeck); Prime Minister Anthony Albanese unveiled new citizenship laws for New Zealanders by making it easier for about 350,000 Kiwis living in Australia to vote and receive government benefits and allowed all New Zealanders on the Special Category Visa to apply for citizenship without becoming permanent residents first, if they have lived in Australia for at least four years; The United States set a record pace for mass killings so far in 2023, with a mass shooting once every 6.53 days according to data from The Associated Press and USA Today; The American Library Association released new data documenting 1,269 demands to censor library books and resources in 2022, the highest number of attempted book bans since it began compiling data about censorship in libraries more than 20 years ago and a record 2,571 unique titles were targeted for censorship, with the vast majority written by or about members of the LGBTQIA+ community and people of diverse cultures (with Julia Claire); 'This is Apparently Your Life' (with Rhys Nicholson and Anthony Albanese); Cancel culture (with Charlie Pickering).
151	13	"Episode 13"	Tony Armstrong, Roy and HG, Aunty Donna, Margaret Pomeranz	None	3 May 2023	377,000
Topics: Tom Cruise and Winnie the Pooh are among the guests to feature in a Coronation concert celebrating the Coronation of Charles III and Camilla and will appear in a series of pre-recorded sketches revealing little known facts about the monarch; The Greens leader Adam Bandt said his party will oppose Labor's $10billion housing fund unless significant changes are made including a fund to support a two-year rental price freeze, direct building of 225,000 publicly owned properties over the decade and a doubling of Commonwealth Rent Assistance, unless income support payments such as JobSeeker and Youth Allowance are increased; Former Cincinnati mayor and talk show host Jerry Springer died at the age of 79 at home in Chicago after a brief illness; 'Agony Armstrong' (with Tony Armstrong); Kyle Sandilands married Tegan Kynaston at the $60 million heritage-listed Swifts mansion at Darling Point, with Prime Minister Anthony Albanese, NSW Premier Chris Minns, Today host Karl Stefanovic and singer Samantha Jade among the high-profile guests at the star-studded wedding which cost an estimated $1 million; Newcomer Gabby Del Castillo, a 25-year-old Monash University student defeated reigning champion Greg Barlow, when he suddenly reached for the vomit bucket while the pair scoffed down chillis, to win the 2023 Melbourne Chilli Eating Championships; Prime Minister Anthony Albanese reportedly will announce the final $240 million needed for a sports stadium at Hobart's Macquarie Point, paving the way for Tasmania to receive its own AFL team (with Roy and HG); Federal Health Minister Mark Butler announced about six million Australians with chronic illnesses will be able to collect a two-month supply of some common medicines, which include 320 medicines on the Pharmaceutical Benefits Scheme, rather than one month when they pick up their prescription, effectively halving the cost but The Pharmacy Guild claimed the changes will cause supply shortages and financially impact pharmacies; Vanessa Hudson was named the new chief executive for Qantas, becoming the first female CEO of the national carrier in its 103-year history and will take up her position when Alan Joyce steps down in November 2023; Climate change was found to cause increased air turbulence during flights, according to Paul Williams, a professor of atmospheric science at the University of Reading in England, as global temperatures increase due to rising levels of greenhouse emissions such as carbon dioxide and the jet stream experienced more sudden changes in wind speed and direction; Aunty Donna's Coffee Café TV series (with Aunty Donna); MILF Manor on Binge (with Margaret Pomeranz); Cancel culture (with Charlie Pickering).
152	14	"Episode 14"	Rhys Nicholson, Suren Jayemanne, Margaret Pomeranz	Andy Zaltzman	10 May 2023	407,000
Topics: Royalists set up numerous tents along the Mall several days before Coronation Day and were swathed in Union Flags and stocked up with food, alcohol and bunting, as large crowds gathered on the procession route near Buckingham Palace; Federal Treasurer Jim Chalmers and Finance Minister Katy Gallagher delivered Labor's second budget which included a $14.6 billion cost-of-living relief package, $11.3 billion to provide aged care workers with an interim increase of 15 per cent to award wages, an extra $40 per fortnight for JobSeeker, youth allowance and Austudy recipients, bulk billing Medicare incentives will be tripled for the most common consultations with children under the age of 16, pensioners and other commonwealth concession card holders, the maximum rate of Commonwealth Rent Assistance will be increased by 15 per cent, and Australia’s first surplus in 15 years; A federal district judge dismissed a copyright infringement lawsuit after a trial in the Manhattan federal court found Ed Sheeran independently created his song 'Thinking out Loud' and he did not infringe on the copyright of the 1973 Marvin Gaye hit 'Let’s Get It On'; Monash City Council in Victoria cancelled a Drag Queen story time event, following repeated threats of violence made against those involved and they could not guarantee the safety of library staff and children (with Rhys Nicholson); Prime Minister Anthony Albanese visited the AUKUS submarine facility while in the UK for King Charles’s coronation; King Charles’s and Camilla's coronation was watched by a peak television audience of 20 million compared to 29 million who watched Queen Elizabeth II’s funeral (with Andy Zaltzman); Victoria Police found a missing Cheltenham woman who took a wrong turn and became bogged in remote Victorian high country for almost a week and she survived only on wine despite being a non-drinker; The Writers Guild in the US went on strike in a dispute with Alliance of Motion Picture and Television Producers over residuals for streaming media, higher pay for services provided and job protection against artificial intelligence such as ChatGPT which raised concerns that it will replace writers (with Suren Jayemanne); I'm a Celebrity...Get Me Out of Here! on Network 10 (with Margaret Pomeranz).
153	15	"Episode 15"	Concetta Caristo, John Cleese, Luke Heggie	None	17 May 2023	369,000
Topics: Peter Dutton used his budget reply speech to accuse the Albanese government of fuelling inflation and he blamed Labor for any future increase to interest rates that would make life harder for millions of Australians; Donald Trump said he will appeal the $5 million judgement awarded by the Manhattan federal jury that found he sexually abused and defamed former magazine columnist E. Jean Carroll; New York Republican George Santos pleaded not guilty to charges of fraud, money laundering and theft of public funds in addition to his lies about being a college graduate, a Wall Street whiz, being from a Jewish family of Holocaust survivors and losing his mother in the September 11 attacks; Elon Musk revealed the new Twitter CEO will be former NBCUniversal executive Linda Yaccarino; Australian progressive synth-metal band Voyager delivered a stunning performance in the second semi-final leading to a spot in the Eurovision Song Contest final; Swedish pop star Loreen defeated 36 challengers to win with her song 'Tattoo' at the Eurovision Song Contest 2023 making her a double Eurovision winner, after first taking the prize in 2012 (with Concetta Caristo); Pakistan's anti-corruption agency arrested former prime minister Imran Khan at Islamabad High Court, sparking clashes between Khan's supporters and police that killed at least one protester; Sam Kerr scored the winning goal for Chelsea women's football team to defeat Manchester United 1-0 in the 2023 FA Cup; 'An Evening With The Late John Cleese' comedy theatre show (with John Cleese); 'Joyful Strains'-Perverts (with Luke Heggie); Cancel culture (with Charlie Pickering).
154	16	"Episode 16"	Lizzy Hoo, Roy and HG, Margaret Pomeranz, Sam Neill	None	24 May 2023	401,000
Topics: Prime Minister Anthony Albanese confirmed the Quad leaders meeting in Sydney will not go ahead after US President Joe Biden cancelled his visit to Australia so he and Biden agreed to meet at the 49th G7 summit in Hiroshima, Japan with Prime Minister Fumio Kishida and Prime Minister Narendra Modi; Ukraine's President Volodymyr Zelenskyy made a surprise visit to Japan after he addressed the 2023 Arab League summit, where he lobbied world leaders at the G7 summit in a bid for more support against Russia's invasion; The 2023 Cannes Film Festival opened with the attendance of high profile Hollywood stars including Harrison Ford, Michelle Yeoh, Michael Douglas, Helen Mirren and Johnny Depp; The 2023 Australian Fashion Week was held in the interior of Sydney's Carriageworks (with Lizzy Hoo); The World Meteorological Organisation warned that global warming was likely to breach the 1.5 degrees Celsius threshold for the first time and at least one of the next five years will be the hottest on record; The 2023 State of Origin series will start in Adelaide when the New South Wales Blues take on the Queensland Maroons on Wednesday 31 May 2023 (with Roy and HG); WrestleMania 39 on Binge (with Margaret Pomeranz); Moira Deeming's supporters booed and heckled Victorian Liberal leader John Pesutto as they disrupted a Victorian Liberal Party conference while clutching masks of her face following the decision to expel Deeming from the parliamentary team for speaking at an anti-trans rally where Neo-Nazis gatecrashed and made Nazi salutes; Stan Grant stood down as host of Q+A following racial abuse on social media for his participation in ABC's coverage of King Charles III’s coronation and due to lack of support from the TV network; 'Did I Ever Tell You This?' memoir book (with Sam Neill); Cancel culture (with Charlie Pickering).
155	17	"Episode 17"	Scout Boxall, Ross Noble, Rhys Nicholson, Dave Hughes	None	31 May 2023	352,000
Topics: A major fire engulfed a seven-storey historic inner-city building in Randle Street, Sydney which took 120 firefighters in 30 trucks to battle the inferno for two hours, and three teenage boys assisted NSW Police and detectives with the ongoing investigation; The Australian Federal Police launched a criminal investigation into former executive of consulting firm PwC, Peter John Collins, after he used confidential Treasury information to benefit the firm's client base by sharing confidential government information to help multinational clients avoid tax, while Treasurer Jim Chalmers would not comment on the referral to the AFP, but said he already took some steps to change how the Tax Practitioners Board operates; A 75-year-old ex-farmer was rescued when he built a mattress out of tree branches and wrote a message for rescuers in the sand after spending a night lost and alone on the vast Nullarbor Plain (with Scout Boxall); 'Jibber Jabber Jamboree' comedy show (with Ross Noble); Co-host of Sunrise, David Koch announced he will quit the role after more than 20 years on the television show to work on other projects and spend more time with family; Premier of Western Australia Mark McGowan announced his resignation and retirement from politics due to exhaustion and the relentless pressure of the job; Gold Coast University Hospital patients were sent to Sea World Resort rooms to free up beds ahead of Winter after doctors cleared them for transfer; 'This is Apparently Your Life' (with Dave Hughes and Rhys Nicholson); Cancel culture (with Charlie Pickering).
156	18	"Episode 18"	Mel Buttle, Luke Heggie, Wil Anderson	None	7 June 2023	422,000
Topics: Federal Court Justice Anthony Besanko dismissed a defamation case Ben Roberts-Smith launched against newspapers The Sydney Morning Herald, The Age and The Canberra Times and journalists Nick McKenzie, Chris Masters and David Wroe for a series of articles published in 2018, after finding that the defendants had proved that some of the most serious allegations of war crimes were substantially true; Roger Cook replaced Mark McGowan as Premier of Western Australia following McGowan's shock resignation a week ago and Rita Saffioti became Deputy Premier of Western Australia after they were both endorsed in a Labor caucus meeting; Australia's Fair Work Commission announced the minimum wage will lift by 8.6 per cent and award rates will rise 5.75 per cent but some economists warned the wage rise would add inflationary pressure despite reports by The Australia Institute and the OECD showed high corporate profits contributed to two thirds of rising inflation; A Black Dog Institute survey reported around 47 per cent of teachers would consider leaving the profession within the next 12 months due to being overworked, underappreciated, working longer hours with fewer resources and would quit if offered a more satisfying career option (with Mel Buttle); 'Joyful Strains'- Raising a generation of soft children (with Luke Heggie); Casino operator Crown Resorts agreed to pay a $450 million civil penalty after reaching an agreement with Australian financial crime watchdog AUSTRAC in relation to historical failings including money laundering and terrorism financing; China’s Defence Minister Li Shangfu warned the US and its allies to stay out of its territory by using the lyrics of a well known Chinese song "When friends visit us, we welcome them with wine. When jackals of war visit us, we will face them with shotguns", as geopolitical tensions rise after a near-collision between a Chinese and US warship in the Taiwan Strait; Marine biologist Sebastian Strand said a beluga whale famously suspected of being a Russian-trained spy and nicknamed Hvaldimir, has migrated from the coast of northern Norway to the Swedish coast due to loneliness; Gruen returning on Wednesday 21 June 2023 (with Wil Anderson); Cancel culture (with Charlie Pickering).
157	19	"Episode 19"	Sarah Ferguson, Rhys Nicholson, Margaret Pomeranz	Andy Zaltzman	14 June 2023	418,000
Topics: Litigation ended following the merger of the PGA Tour, PGA European Tour and LIV Golf where the three organisations would pool their commercial rights into a new for-profit entity, which will be exclusively funded by the Saudi Arabian government's Public Investment Fund; David Koch made his final appearance as presenter of Sunrise on 9 June 2023; Hundreds of active wildfires in Canada caused an orange haze over New York City affecting the air quality and led to cancellation of school activities, warnings for people to stay indoors and grounded aeroplanes; Four Indigenous siblings aged thirteen, nine, four and one, were rescued and taken to a military hospital after they survived for forty days following a plane crash in the Colombian Amazon jungle but their mother died four days after the crash; Boris Johnson stood down immediately as a Conservative MP after an investigation into the Partygate scandal found he misled parliament and a lengthy suspension from the House of Commons was recommended but Johnson said he may try to make a return to politics as he was "very sad to be leaving parliament – at least for now" (with Andy Zaltzmann); Reserve Bank of Australia Governor Philip Lowe was hounded by A Current Affair reporter Simon Bouda for walking onto the stage to Justin Timberlake's song 'Can't Stop the Feeling!' a day after raising interest rates for the 12th time in thirteen months; Prosecutors charged Donald Trump with 37 felonies, including 31 counts under the Espionage Act for "willful retention" of classified records where Trump haphazardly stashed military secrets throughout his Florida estate and other locations after he left office, and Trump ordered an aide, Walt Nauta, to move boxes with classified records to obscure them from investigators which Trump did without informing his attorney, who was preparing to search Trump’s property in compliance with court-authorised subpoenas to recover the classified records; A biotechnology company called Colossal Biosciences announced a plan to "de-extinct" the Dodo and may use artificial intelligence for their ongoing projects to recreate the Woolly mammoth and the Thylacine also called the Tasmanian tiger (with Rhys Nicholson); The Kardashians on Disney Plus in Australia (with Margaret Pomeranz); Cancellation of the 'Australian Bureau of Cancellation' (with Charlie Pickering).

=== Season 10 (2024) ===
No. overall	No. in season	Title	Featured guest	International correspondent	Original release date	Australia viewers (millions)
159	1	"Episode 1"	Margaret Pomeranz, Rhys Nicholson, Eric Bana	None	7 February 2024	932,000
Topics: The Weekly with Charlie Pickering on ABC TV and ABC iview (with Margaret Pomeranz); A group of parents from Sydney's private boys' school Newington College threatened legal action over a decision by the school to turn co-educational with plans to introduce girls from 2026, and become fully co-ed by 2033; Vacuum cleaner retail chain Godfreys entered voluntary administration amid challenging economic conditions; Discord's CEO Jason Citron, Shap's CEO Evan Spiegel, TikTok's CEO Shou Zi Chew, Twitter's CEO Linda Yaccarino, and Meta Platforms's CEO Mark Zuckerberg, were questioned during a US Senate hearing about failing to protect children from threats of sexual predation; A couple from New South Wales and a Queensland woman won $100 million each in the $200 million Powerball which is the largest prize in Australia's lottery history; ADHD (with Rhys Nicholson and Dr. Steven Chao); Elon Musk said the first human to be implanted with a chip inside the brain by his co-founded neurotechnology company Neuralink was recovering well; Nemesis Australian television documentary covering a decade of The Coalition in government; Buckingham Palace released a statement announcing King Charles was diagnosed with cancer but the form of cancer was not revealed; Force of Nature: The Dry 2 film (with Eric Bana); Cancel culture (with Charlie Pickering).
160	2	"Episode 2"	Concetta Caristo, Barrie Cassidy, Russell Howard	None	14 February 2024	857,000
Topics: Barnaby Joyce was filmed lying on a footpath in Canberra late at night and swearing into his mobile phone after apparently falling off a planter box, but he later claimed he mistakenly drank alcohol after taking prescription medication; Supermarket giants Coles and Woolworths will face a parliamentary committee into price gouging and record profits amid the cost-of-living crisis with former Australian Competition & Consumer Commission chair Allan Fels handing his report to the Federal Government stating that "rising prices were not just caused by true inflation but often by greed, corporate gouging and 'profit pushing' by companies with too much market power."; Switzerland as Australia's next ally (with Concetta Caristo and Daniel Frutgier - president of the NSW Swiss Club); A photograph of a polar bear sleeping on an iceberg wins the Wildlife Photographer of the Year People's Choice Award in a wildlife photography competition run by the Natural History Museum, London; The Enhanced Games is an international sports event planned for 2025 where athletes are not subjected to drug testing and allows athletes to use performance-enhancing drugs but anti-doping critics warn the event is irresponsible and puts profit before the health of athletes; Reporting on how The Weekly with Charlie Pickering reports on sports gambling (with Barrie Cassidy); NFL commissioner Roger Goodell says Super Bowl 58 conspiracy theories involving Taylor Swift and Travis Kelce, whose team the Kansas City Chiefs will compete in the Super Bowl, are "nonsense" as right-wing critics say their relationship is part of a plot to rig the NFL's championship game and help get US President Joe Biden re-elected; Labor passed its Right to disconnect Law where employees are not to be contacted by their employers outside of rostered work hours but a second stage that prevents employers from facing criminal penalties for contacting employees after working hours and other changes including a right for some casual workers to seek permanence and minimum standards for gig workers are yet to be passed; Labor and the Greens joined forces in the Senate to block an attempt by the Textile, Clothing and Footwear Union to split from the CFMEU; Russell Howard Live 2024 stand-up comedy show (with Russell Howard); Nemesis Australian television documentary covering a decade of The Coalition in government; Cancel culture (with Charlie Pickering).
161	3	"Episode 3"	Casey Briggs, Nicolette Minster, Margaret Pomeranz, Rhys Nicholson	None	21 February 2024	871,000
Topics: Prime Minister Anthony Albanese posted on social media the words "She said Yes" on Valentine's Day referring to his marriage proposal to Jodie Haydon; Taylor Swift arrives in Melbourne for the start of her concerts The Eras Tour in Australia (with Nicolette Minster); Research from RMIT University values the national economic impact of Taylor Swift's concerts 'The Eras Tour' at more than half a billion dollars for Australia (with Casey Briggs); Asbestos in mulch detected in schools, parks, residential housing, supermarkets and hospitals across Sydney led to the Environmental Protection Authority's biggest investigation in its history and may consider criminal charges over the blunder; Judge Arthur Engoron ordered Donald Trump to pay over $355 million of his fortune, plus interest, in a New York civil fraud case finding Trump lied for years about his wealth on financial statements he used to secure loans and make deals as he built the real estate empire that vaulted him to fame and the presidency, which included Trump committing fraud with his financial statements, falsifying business records, issuing false financial statements, conspiracy to commit insurance fraud and conspiracy to falsify business records; The Russian prison service said Russian opposition leader and anti-corruption activist Alexei Navalny is dead after he "felt unwell after a walk and almost immediately lost consciousness" and said it was investigating his "sudden death", which drew strong reactions from Western leaders including US President Joe Biden who blamed Russian President Vladimir Putin, and said that "what has happened to Navalny is yet more proof of Putin’s brutality"; Gladiators on Network 10 and 10Play (with Margaret Pomeranz); National Party deputy leader Perin Davey was seen slurring her words and speaking incoherently during a parliamentary hearing but she denied being drunk then later admitted she had consumed alcohol at a function before attending the Senate hearing; A booze ban is being considered inside Parliament House and alcohol testing inside the building following Barnaby Joyce lying on a footpath in Canberra late at night and swearing into his mobile phone after apparently falling off a planter box due to mistakenly drinking alcohol after taking prescription medication and Perin Davey admitting to drinking alcohol at a function in Parliament House before slurring her words during a Senate hearing; Facebook celebrates its 20th anniversary (with Rhys Nicholson); Cancel culture (with Charlie Pickering).
162	4	"Episode 4"	Concetta Caristo, Roy and HG	Alice Hamilton (US Correspondent)	28 February 2024	781,000
Topics: Travis Kelce arrived in Sydney to support his girlfriend Taylor Swift who is performing a series of sold-out concerts in Australia as part of the international leg of her record-breaking concert The Eras Tour; Woolworths chief executive Brad Banducci announced his retirement just days after ABC's Four Corners aired footage of the departing CEO walking out of an interview, as part of its documentary on allegations of price gouging by the major supermarkets, Woolworths and its rival Coles; Cryptocurrency exchange Crypto.com mistakenly deposited $10.5 million directly into an Australian woman’s bank account when the platform only intended to give her a $100 refund then realised the error seven months later and sued the Victorian woman after she used the money to buy a mansion and other properties in Sunbury, Craigieburn and Mickleham; Mongolia as Australia's next ally (with Concetta Caristo and Bayarkhuu Purevdorj - Honorary Consul of Mongolia); The Odysseus lunar lander, built by Intuitive Machines in partnership with NASA, became the first privately built lunar lander to land on the moon; The US Presidential election in November 2024 will likely be between Joe Biden and Donald Trump for a second time (with Alice Hamilton); Scott Morrison gave his valedictory speech to parliament, ending more than 16 years in politics and one term as prime minister; The 2024 NRL season started in Las Vegas where the Sydney Roosters defeated the Brisbane Broncos 20-10, after Manly Sea Eagles gained victory over South Sydney Rabbitohs 36-24 at the site of the Super Bowl (with Roy and HG); Cancel culture (with Charlie Pickering); A man was tackled and restrained by other passengers onboard an American Airlines flight after he "aggressively" tried to open the aeroplane door mid-flight and video footage showed the man being escorted from the aeroplane to the tarmac in handcuffs by four Albuquerque law enforcement officers.
163	5	"Episode 5"	Zoë Coombs Marr, Celeste Barber	None	6 March 2024	793,000
Topics: ASIO boss Mike Burgess revealed a plot by a retired politician to introduce a prime minister's family member to foreign spies while that politician was in government but he refused to name the politician; US President Joe Biden was caught in an awkward moment as he was eating an icecream at an icecream shop with talkshow host Seth Meyers after appearing on the talkshow when reporters asked him about a ceasefire for the Gaza war; The Willy's Chocolate Experience which debuted on 24 February 2024 in Glasgow, Scotland, was cancelled after one day when police were called and it was revealed that actors had only one day to learn a script made of AI-generated gibberish, the event had no chocolate and children were given a single jelly bean and a cup of lemonade; Labor's Jodie Belyea won the Dunkley by-election in Victoria, as Liberal's candidate Nathan Conroy conceded defeat; 2024 Sydney Gay and Lesbian Mardi Gras Parade (with Zoë Coombs Marr); The NRL's 2024 season's opening games in Las Vegas was a success despite a complaint of a racial nature lodged by Brisbane Broncos's Ezra Mam against Sydney Roosters's Spencer Leniu and Las Vegas Escort services featured prominently during the broadcasts; Derryn Hinch confirmed he will contest the role of Lord Mayor of Melbourne in the 2024 Melbourne City Council election in October 2024; Multimillionaire and CEO of Kellogg's Gary Pilnick was excoriated after he urged cash-strapped families who are struggling to afford their grocery bills to just eat cereal for dinner despite cereal prices increasing 28 percent over the past four years; The internet's obsession with the absence of the Princess of Wales sparked outrageous conspiracy theories and appeared to have escalated after she was reportedly photographed for the first time in two months with some people claiming it was a body double; Backup Dancer comedy show (with Celeste Barber); Cancel culture (with Charlie Pickering); Spectators were awestruck after Australian cricketer Ellyse Perry hit a massive six that not only cleared the boundary but also shattered a car window in the process during the WPL 2024.
164	6	"Episode 6"	Rhys Nicholson, Scout Boxall, Geoffrey Robertson	None	13 March 2024	793,000
Topics: Sam Kerr faced legal action when she allegedly called a police officer "stupid white bastard" following a win with her club Chelsea, celebrating with a few drinks then she vomitted in a taxi cab and had an argument with the taxi driver; Nikki Haley suspended her campaign for the US presidential race after Super Tuesday elections; Private health insurance companies will raise premiums by 3.03 percent on 1 April 2024 (with Rhys Nicholson); Researchers from the University of Erlangen-Nuremberg (FAU) said a 62-year-old man from Germany chose to receive 217 COVID-19 vaccinations for "private reasons" within the space of 29 months and the results showed that the man's immunity to the virus did not wane or become fatigued with every subsequent shot, and there was a significant increase in antibodies which are protective proteins produced by the immune system; Virgin Australia announced small dogs and cats are allowed in the cabin on domestic flights within the next 12 months, subject to regulatory approval; 2024 Australian Grand Prix in Melbourne (with Scout Boxall); 96th Academy Awards broadcast; A poorly edited photograph released for Mother's Day in the UK featuring the Princess of Wales and her three children further fuelled conspiracy theories of her mysterious absence; How Do We Fix a Turbulent World? live stage show (with Geoffrey Robertson); Cancel culture (with Charlie Pickering).
165	7	"Episode 7"	Claire Hooper, Concetta Caristo, Miriam Margolyes	None	20 March 2024	927,000
Topics: The Australian Criminal Intelligence Commission conducted analysis of wastewater data and found more than 16.5 tonnes of methamphetamine, cocaine, heroin and MDMA was consumed by Australians in the year ending August 2023, a 17 percent increase from the last reporting period; The Albanese government said its plan for fuel efficiency standards for new cars would place a yearly cap on the emissions output for new cars sold in Australia to incentivise carmakers to supply low-and-zero-emissions vehicles and penalise companies that do not while legislation required to create the standards which only apply to new passenger and light commercial vehicles, would be introduced to federal parliament in the first half of 2024 and take effect from January 2025 (with Claire Hooper); A global IT outage at McDonald's prevented its servers from processing payments and its restaurants closed across Australia and several other countries on Friday 15 March 2024 but a McDonald's spokesperson stated it was not a cybersecurity incident; Vladimir Putin won Russia's presidency in the 2024 Russian presidential election with 87.97 per cent of the vote, according to the country's Central Election Commission but many international observers say the vote was rigged to favour Putin as his opponents were either dead, in prison or Putin sent them into exile; US President Joe Biden reportedly directed his senior staff to significantly step up efforts to highlight all of Donald Trump's misinformation and disinformation; Monaco as Australia's next ally (with Concetta Caristo and Myriam Boisbouvier-Wylie - Melbourne-based Monégasque and Honorary Consul General of France in Melbourne); Tasmania's Premier Jeremy Rockliff said if his government is re-elected on 23 March 2024 in the state election then he will build the world's largest chocolate fountain that will sit alongside the Cadbury chocolate factory as well as a premium chocolate studio, a chocolate laboratory to make-your-own chocolate bar, a chocolate emporium, café and playground; Recent photographs and video clips by an onlooker and published by tabloid outlets The Sun and TMZ appeared to show the Princess of Wales with Prince William at Windsor Farm shop wearing casual clothes and carrying shopping bags and as they walked through the shop's car park amid speculations over her whereabouts and wellbeing; Oh, Miriam! Live stage show and 'Oh Miriam! Stories from an Extraordinary Life' book (with Miriam Margolyes); Cancel culture (with Charlie Pickering).
166	8	"Episode 8"	Lou Wall, Margaret Pomeranz, Rhys Nicholson	None	27 March 2024	841,000
Topics: Donald Trump insulted Australian ambassador to the US Kevin Rudd during a television interview with Nigel Farage when he said "I heard he was a little bit nasty. I hear he's not the brightest bulb, but I don't know much about him. If he's at all hostile, he will not be there long."; Queensland Premier Steven Miles said a new Olympic stadium will not be built at Victoria Park as it was too expensive so Lang Park will be the centrepiece of the 2032 Olympic and Paralympic Games, along with changes to other venues; Nostradamus's predictions appeared to come true in 2024 (with Lou Wall); Tasmania's 2024 state election results showed a hung parliament as Liberal leader Jeremy Rockliff claimed victory over Labor leader Rebecca White; Ferrari's Carlos Sainz won the 2024 Australian Grand Prix in Melbourne; Organisers of the Sydney Royal Easter Show promised increased security this year to avoid a repeat of last year's gang violence; Harvard Medical School physician-scientists at Massachusetts General Hospital transplanted a genetically modified pig kidney into a human and the pig's kidney was genetically edited to make it more compatible with humans to reduce the chance of infection for patients with end-stage kidney failure; A Current Affair on the Nine Network (with Margaret Pomeranz); Bill Shorten referred an unofficial National Disability Insurance Scheme conference to the Australian Competition & Consumer Commission for falsely promoting him as keynote speaker and wrongly promoting that other government ministers would be in attendance; Finland was in the number one position in the 2024 World Happiness Report for the seventh consecutive time and Australia was in tenth place; China-based online retailer Temu is facing a class-action lawsuit in Illinois over data privacy concerns which alleged Temu violates its customers' privacy rights by collecting private data and using deceptive and unscrupulous practices to access that data (with Rhys Nicholson); Cancel culture (with Charlie Pickering).
167	9	"Episode 9"	Zoë Coombs Marr, Roy and HG	None	3 April 2024	867,000
Topics: Conservative and progressive political commentators criticised Donald Trump for being self-serving and hypocritical after the cash-strapped Trump launched the sale of The Holy Bible renamed 'God Bless The USA Bible' for $60 each, which included a copy of the US Constitution; The Splendour in the Grass music festival was cancelled for 2024 following the cancellation of Groovin' the Moo due to insufficient ticket sales which caused concern about the future of Australia's live music industry; MP Andrew Wilkie used parliamentary privilege to accuse Melbourne Demons players of evading illicit drug tests with the AFL's help by asking players who tested positive for illicit drugs to fake injuries to cover up their result (with Roy and HG); The Coalition is developing new laws that could break up the power of the supermarket giants Coles and Woolworths, which includes forcing supermarkets to sell off assets if they repeatedly abused their market power but Labor is opposed to these laws; China's government officially abolished heavy tariffs of 220 percent on Australian wine which was in place for the past three years due to Scott Morrison insulting China by calling for an investigation into the origins of COVID-19; The floating door prop in the sea from the 1997 film Titanic, which only had room to save Kate Winslet’s character Rose but not Leonardo DiCaprio’s Jack, was sold at auction for $718,750; Tim Berners-Lee's World Wide Web celebrated its 35th anniversary in 2024 (with Zoë Coombs Marr); Cancel culture (with Charlie Pickering).
168	10	"Episode 10"	Rhys Nicholson, Margaret Pomeranz, Justin Hamilton	None	10 April 2024	942,000
Topics: Network Ten succeeded in a bid to re-open the defamation case against Bruce Lehrmann to present new evidence before the court which included calling former Seven Network producer Taylor Auerbach, who worked on the network's Spotlight program and allegedly reimbursed Bruce Lehrmann for money spent on illicit drugs, prostitutes, Thai massages, paid flights and expensive dinners during its efforts to recruit him for a tell-all interview; Prime Minister Anthony Albanese announced Samantha Mostyn as Australia's next governor-general from 1 July 2024; QANTAS made changes to its frequent flyer programme by adding more than 20 million rewards seats on international and domestic flights; Flybuys loyalty rewards program celebrated its 30th anniversary in 2024 (with Rhys Nicholson); Meteorologists claim that technically there is no such thing as a "rain bomb" in the field of meteorology, following recent torrential rain and thunderstorms which caused flooding along the east coast; Forbes World's Billionaires List of the Richest People in 2024 revealed there are 2781 billionaires in the world in 2024 with a combined wealth of 14.2 TRILLION dollars which is 141 more billionaires and two trillion dollars more than in 2023; Donald Trump likened himself to South African leader Nelson Mandela as he ranted on social media and took aim at Judge Juan Merchan, who is overseeing Trump’s New York hush money case, writing that "I will gladly become a Modern Day Nelson Mandela — it’d be a great honour to go to jail for violating a gag order against him in the upcoming trial"; Daylight saving time in Australia ended with South Australia, New South Wales, the Australian Capital Territory, Victoria and Tasmania turning their clocks back one hour, while Queensland, the Northern Territory and Western Australia did not; A recent survey of more than 10,000 travellers from nine countries by The Hilton Trend Report, found that the top reason people want to travel in 2024 is to 'rest and recharge' and sleep tourism is motivating people’s vacation choices, including what they pack and where they stay (with Justin Hamilton); President of Botswana Mokgweetsi Masisi threatened to send 20,000 elephants to Germany and criticised the German government and its environment ministry for seeking to ban the import of hunting trophies despite Botswana's overpopulation of elephants, following Germany's possibility of stricter limits on the import of hunting trophies due to poaching concerns; A rare total solar eclipse swept across the Pacific Ocean, through Mexico, the United States and Canada on 8 April 2024 (North American time); House of Villains on E! Entertainment Television (with Margaret Pomeranz); Cancel culture (with Charlie Pickering).
169	11	"Episode 11"	Concetta Caristo, Margaret Pomeranz, Guy Montgomery	None	17 April 2024	882,000
Topics: Bruce Lehrmann was evicted from a 4.1 million dollar rental in Sydney after the landlord received complaints from neighbours about loud music at late night parties, partygoers holding irritating karaoke nights, swearing loudly, girls shrieking and screaming, cars parked on footpaths and blocked driveways; Bruce Lehrmann lost his defamation case against Network Ten and Lisa Wilkinson, after Justice Michael Lee found the former Liberal staffer was not defamed by Wilkinson and Ten in an interview with Brittany Higgins in February 2021, and that on the balance of probabilities Lehrmann raped Higgins in Parliament House in 2019, and Justice Lee described Lehrmann's decision to bring the civil case against Channel Ten and Wilkinson, after his criminal trial was aborted due to juror misconduct, as "Having escaped the lion's den, Mr Lehrmann made the mistake of going back for his hat."; Prime Minister Anthony Albanese said it was encouraging to hear US President Joe Biden's response that the prosecution of Julian Assange could be dropped after Biden said "We are considering it" when asked about requests to end the US government's pursuit of the Wikileaks founder over the release of classified documents; O. J. Simpson, who was tried and acquitted for the murders of his ex-wife Nicole Brown Simpson and her friend Ronald Goldman, died at the age of 76; A Texas man formerly known as Dustin Ebey has legally changed his name to 'Literally Anybody Else' and announced he will run for US president in the 2024 United States elections because he was not satisfied with this year's presidential candidates, Joe Biden and Donald Trump; New Zealand as Australia's next ally (with Concetta Caristo and Tyson Tuala - Cultural Consultant); Liberal Party candidate Simon Kennedy won more than 71 percent of the vote, two-party preferred, in the by-election to choose a replacement for Scott Morrison in the seat of Cook, but with no Labor Party candidate contesting the seat, the Greens candidate Martin Moore was Kennedy's closest rival, with a 28.81 percent two party-preferred; South Korea's liberal opposition party won a landslide majority in the country's general election to control parliament, where The Democratic Party (DPK) and smaller opposition parties jointly won 192 of 300 seats in the National Assembly defeating President Yoon Suk Yeol's conservative People Power Party (PPP) with 108 seats; Tipping Point Australia on the Nine Network (with Margaret Pomeranz); The 28-minute long episode of Bluey titled 'The Sign' attracted an average of 2.28 million viewers for the ABC on Sunday 14 April 2024 which was in the national Top Five television shows on the day; Iran said it launched a wave of strikes towards Israel which lasted approximately five hours in retaliation to a deadly Israeli strike on the Iranian consulate in Damascus, Syria, earlier in April 2024 but US President Joe Biden told Israeli Prime Minister Benjamin Netanyahu in a phone call that the US helped to take down almost all of the aerial drones and ballistic missiles launched at Israel by Iran and the US will not participate in any offensive operations against Iran; Guy Montgomery's Guy Mont-Spelling Bee comedy stage show and television series (with Guy Montgomery); Cancel culture (with Charlie Pickering).
170	12	"Episode 12"	Scout Boxall, Rhys Nicholson, Zoë Coombs Marr	Andy Zaltzman (UK Correspondent)	24 April 2024	757,000
Topics: Woolworths CEO Brad Banducci was warned he could face six months in prison or a $5,000 fine if he was held in contempt by the Senate for failing to answer questions at the Senate inquiry into price gouging and the supermarket giant's profitability, while Coles chief executive Leah Weckert was also questioned and she said the business had seen an unprecedented amount of cost price increases; Woolworths was fined $1.2 million after failing to pay long service leave entitlements to about 1200 Victorian staff members who were short-changed on their holiday pay over a two-year period; Two of the seven jurors chosen on Tuesday for Donald Trump’s New York hush money trial were abruptly dismissed on Thursday after questions arose about the impartiality of one and the truthfulness of another; A recent Australian census showed that after a brief rise in attendance for Pentecostal churches, there is a decline in Pentecostal affiliation with gender inequality and leadership abuses of power as some of the reasons for leaving Pentecostal churches (with Scout Boxall); The Olympic flame was lit in a ceremony in Greece's ancient Olympia and the lighting of the flame was the start of an international torch relay which ends at the Paris 2024 Olympic Games; The United States Anti-Doping Agency accused the World Anti-Doping Agency of sweeping the positive tests of 23 Chinese swimmers "under the carpet" by giving them clearance to compete in the Tokyo 2021 Olympics and their positive tests were not publicly revealed until 21 April 2024 when media reported the US anti-doping agency's Chinese case involved a medication called Trimetazidine, which is a well-known prescription medication for people with heart disease and is known to help athletes improve stamina and decrease recovery times; According to a recent Ipsos poll, support for the Conservative Party in the UK fell to its lowest level in 45 years, where The Tories' vote share fell to just 19 per cent – a record low for the second consecutive month – with Labour leading by 25 points on 44 per cent, and the personal approval ratings for Prime Minister Rishi Sunak are now at the worst level in the history of Ipsos polling (with Andy Zaltzman); After Australia legislated same-sex marriage in 2017, the Australian Bureau of Statistics showed a rise in same-sex marriages as well as same-sex divorces (with Zoë Coombs Marr and Rhys Nicholson); Cancel culture (with Charlie Pickering).
171	13	"Episode 13"	Roy and HG, Luka Muller, Margaret Pomeranz	None	1 May 2024	862,000
Topics: Prime Minister Anthony Albanese called Elon Musk "arrogant" after Musk made comments goading Mr Albanese on his social media platform Twitter X, following Musk's feud with Australia's eSafety commissioner over an order to remove graphic and violent footage of the Sydney's Wakeley church stabbing attack; The Coalition urged the government to trial age verification on social media to block young Australian children from accessing platforms and being exposed to harmful images and videos; Donald Trump spoke to reporters about his wife Melania’s birthday and the Supreme Court arguments about his immunity case as he entered the Manhattan courthouse for his New York hush money trial; The Tasmanian government became the first state to officially recognise those who identify as asexual, aromantic or agender (with Luka Muller); The Albanese Government will invest $161.3 million over four years to establish a National Firearms Register as part of next month’s Budget to allow law enforcement to assess firearms risks by providing frontline police officers with near real-time information on firearms, parts, and owners, and linking firearms information with other relevant police and government information; State legislators in Tennessee passed a bill allowing teachers and school staff in the state to carry a concealed handgun on school grounds; The 2024 Indian general election voting will last 44 days to enable the country's nearly one billion people to cast a vote which will be counted and the results declared on 4 June 2024; Federal Labor MP Dan Repacholi is two qualifying events away from securing a spot on Australia's Olympic team for the 2024 Paris Games and if successful, it will be the air pistol champion's sixth Olympics since his first appearance at Athens in 2004 (with Roy and HG); Adam Farquharson turned the biggest pumpkin grown in Australia in 2024 by his friend Mark Peacock, into a canoe and paddled the 407-kilogram pumpkin named Tormund one mile down the Tumut River; Bonza budget airline went into administration as flights across the country were cancelled and a phone hotline for affected passengers was set up while other airlines offered free seats to stranded passengers; Play School on ABC TV (with Margaret Pomeranz); Cancel culture (with Charlie Pickering).
172	14	"Episode 14"	Concetta Caristo, Dave Hughes, Rhys Nicholson	None	8 May 2024	818,000
Topics: Prime Minister Anthony Albanese announced a permanent program for $925 million over five years to go towards permanently establishing the Leaving Violence Program (LVP) to provide people fleeing violent relationships with up to $5,000 in financial support, as well as access to referral services, risk assessments, and safety planning, and the program is expected to be available from the middle of 2025; Australian university-based pro-Palestinian protest movements that are similar to those in the United States have sprung up at campuses in Sydney, Melbourne, Adelaide and Canberra, with participants calling on their teaching institutions to disclose and cut ties with weapons manufacturers they say are supplying arms to Israel in the Gaza war; The United States as Australia's next ally (with Concetta Caristo and Brian Hoyt - Deputy Political Counsellor, US Embassy in Canberra); QANTAS apologised after an issue with its app which allowed customers to view the details of other passengers, including their names, boarding pass and upcoming flights but QANTAS said the problem was caused by a technology issue and there is no indication of a cyber security incident; A New Yorker wearing an orange ski mask nicknamed Cheeseball Man announced on social media that he will eat an entire jar of cheeseballs in New York's Union Square Park on 27 April 2024 at 3:00pm, and the stunt attracted a large crowd of spectators at the venue as he consumed over 400 cheeseballs in thirty minutes; Mindfulness (with Dave Hughes); The International Monetary Fund warned Artificial intelligence (AI) will threaten forty percent of global jobs done by humans as job replacement has been a key risk factor with advancement in AI-related technology (with Rhys Nicholson); Cancel culture (with Charlie Pickering).

=== Season 11 (2025) ===
No. overall	No. in season	Title	Featured guest	International correspondent	Original release date	Australia viewers (millions)
174	1	"Episode 1"	Margaret Pomeranz, Rhys Nicholson, Damien Power	None	12 March 2025	880,000
Topics: Media coverage of Cyclone Alfred intensified as Queensland braces for the cyclone to arrive; US President Donald Trump suspended all US military aid to Ukraine effective immediately and European Union countries responded with an ambitious plan to re-arm in support of Ukraine; New data from NASA claimed Asteroid 2024 YR4 would hit the Earth on 22 December 2032 but then later claimed it would hit the moon on that date (with Damien Power); Labor leader Roger Cook was re-elected as Premier of Western Australia in the 2025 Western Australian state election; The firing of Antoinette Lattouf by the ABC (with Rhys Nicholson); Australian casinos company Star Entertainment Group is reported to be on the brink of financial collapse after owing $100 million in fines for money laundering and $400 million in debts; Prime Minister Anthony Albanese has not announced a date for the federal election citing it was not appropriate during a natural disaster like Cyclone Alfred approaching Queensland; Opposition leader Peter Dutton was criticised for travelling to Sydney for a Liberal Party fundraiser rather than staying in his electorate of Dickson in Brisbane where his constituents are being affected by Cyclone Alfred; Celebrating 100 years of compulsory voting in Australia with a federal election in 2025 (with Rhys Nicholson); FBoy Island Australia on Binge (with Margaret Pomeranz); 'Charlie's Heroes' Award: Barry Clark, for disarming a teenager who allegedly boarded a Jetstar plane with a loaded shotgun.
175	2	"Episode 2"	Zoë Coombs Marr, Rhys Nicholson, Scout Boxall	None	19 March 2025	715,000
Topics: US stock market loses $5 trillion after US President Donald Trump imposed trade tariffs on numerous countries; Prime Minister Anthony Albanese confirms Australia will not impose retaliatory trade tariffs on the United States; American social media influencer Sam Jones posted a video of her taking a baby wombat away from its mother during a trip to Australia, and she later posted a questionable apology video after leaving Australia claiming she only moved the baby away from the road to avoid it being hit; ADHD (with Zoë Coombs Marr); Chinese warships continue to circumnavigate Australia with a recent case of a commercial pilot flying over the Tasman Sea who received a surprise warning from a Chinese navy task-force in international waters that it was engaging in live-fire drills which prompted airlines to divert planes; Australian Grand Prix in Melbourne (with Scout Boxall); Former Australian cricketer Stuart MacGill avoided prison after being found guilty of taking part in the supply of cocaine in Sydney; Disney's live action re-make of Snow White continued to spark controversy ahead of the film adaptation's premiere; Water (with Rhys Nicholson); 'Charlie's Heroes' Award: Suni Williams and Butch Wilmore, for surviving nine months in space when they were originally scheduled for an eight-day mission, but their return was complicated when the Boeing Starliner spacecraft they were testing was deemed unsafe for the journey home.
176	3	"Episode 3"	Sashi Perera, Concetta Caristo, Ruby Wax	None	26 March 2025	811,000
Topics: The ACCC's Supermarket Inquiry found: Woolworths and Coles Supermarkets were among the most profitable supermarkets in the world, Woolworths and Coles dominance are oligopoly rather than duopoly, there is a power imbalance that disadvantaged suppliers when dealing with the two supermarket giants, and it was difficult to conclude the two supermarkets are price gouging customers; US President Donald Trump signed an Executive Order for the JFK assassination files to be released; IVF (with Sashi Perera); The Novak Djokovic-founded Professional Tennis Players' Association filed a lawsuit against the tennis governing bodies, accusing them of anti-competitive practices and a disregard for player welfare but The ATP and WTA said they would fight against the lawsuit and called the claims "baseless"; Canada as Australia's Top Ally (with Concetta Caristo and Rod Johns- President of the Canada Club of Victoria); Tesla recalled nearly all the Cybertrucks it produced to repair a stainless steel trim panel that the carmaker said can become detached from the vehicle while driving due to the wrong type of glue used; US federal judge Theodore Chuang blocked Elon Musk and the DOGE from taking any more steps to shut down the USAID as Musk's efforts to close the foreign aid agency likely violated the U.S. Constitution; Following Elon Musk's appointment to DOGE, attacks on property carrying the Tesla logo of Musk’s electric-car company are on the rise across the US and overseas including at Tesla showrooms, vehicle lots, charging stations and privately owned cars with Tesla cars set on fire, damaged and vandalised; Federal Treasurer Jim Chalmers handed down his fourth budget with cost-of-living support for middle Australia and a $17.1 billion in tax cuts to deliver a second term for the Albanese government at the upcoming election; I'm Not As Well As I Thought I Was, comedy show based on the book (with Ruby Wax); 'Stories My Mum Sent Me'.
177	4	"Episode 4"	Margaret Pomeranz, Richard Roxburgh, Rhys Nicholson	None	2 April 2025	861,000
Topics: Actor Leonardo DiCaprio urged Australia to shut down controversial salmon farms and save rare fish Maugean skate as the Albanese government presented new laws that could wipe out the native fish in Tasmania's Macquarie Harbour; Australian Greens Senator Sarah Hanson-Young brought a dead salmon in a plastic bag into the Senate Chamber to question Labor over its plans to change the law to protect salmon farming in Tasmania's Macquarie Harbour; Prime Minister Anthony Albanese used the term "delulu with no solulu" to criticise opposition leader Peter Dutton over Dutton's energy and economic plan in Parliament, which he said would require unnamed cuts to public services; It was later revealed that social and fashion influencers Lucy Jackson and Nikki Westcott suggested Anthony Albanese could use the term "delulu with no solulu - delusional with no solution" in parliament when they interviewed him on their podcast show Happy Hour; Prime Minister Anthony Albanese announced Saturday 3 May 2025 to be the date of the 2025 Australian federal election; Three women were caught on surveillance camera vandalising a political poster of Independent MP Zali Steggall with a Chanel lipstick in Sydney; Deal Or No Deal on Channel 10 (with Margaret Pomeranz); Australian basketball star Josh Giddey scored a long-range buzzer beater for the Chicago Bulls over LeBron James to defeat the Los Angeles Lakers; Jeffrey Goldberg, editor-in-chief of The Atlantic magazine, said he was accidentally added to a Signal messaging app group chat titled 'Houthi PC Small Group' on 13 March 2025 with top officials from US President Donald Trump's administration, where confidential military plans to strike Houthi targets in Yemen were being discussed and the bombings on Houthis in Yeman began two hours after Goldberg received the information; Prime Minister Anthony Albanese announced his first election promise was to ease cost of living pressures with a ban on price gouging by superkmarkets and will impose multi-million dollar fines if they are caught; The Correspondent film (with Richard Roxburgh); Former South Australian Liberal Party leader David Speirs pleaded guilty to two drug supply charges in Adelaide Magistrates Court; The French government reportedly planned to send a 'survival manual' to all households containing advice on what to do in the event of an armed conflict, natural disaster or health crisis (with Rhys Nicholson); 'Stories My Mum Sent Me'.
178	5	"Episode 5"	Concetta Caristo, Rhys Darby, Ahir Shah	None	9 April 2025	819,000
Topics: Two men were charged after they carried firearms undetected through the MCG's new AI-driven security system called Evolv Express, which has come under fire in the United States over failures to detect weapons in schools, and the guns were discovered only after the men's behaviour caught the attention of police, who searched them; US President Donald Trump launched what he called "Liberation Day" where trade tariffs of varying percentages were imposed on all countries including a ten percent tariff on Australia's remote Heard Island and McDonald Islands which have no human population and only inhabited by penguins and other wildlife; A global stock market crash resulted from Donald Trump's global trade tariff policies with six TRILLION dollars wiped off the stock market in two days; Mexico as Australia's Top Ally (with Concetta Caristo), co-presidents Fabiola and Pedro from MexVic Association of Victoria; Victorian crime figure Tony Mokbel was granted bail by Victoria's Court of Appeal after 18 years in prison as he fights to overturn drug convictions; Opposition leader Peter Dutton kicked a football into 10 News First camera operator Ghaith Nadir's head, knocking the camera into his head and resulting in a bloodied forehead, during Dutton's trip to Darwin; Prime Minister Anthony Albanese tripped and almost fell off the stage after delivering a speech to the Mining and Energy Union during his election campaign in Lovedale; Rhys Darby: The Legend Returns comedy show (with Rhys Darby); One Nation Party leader Pauline Hanson's daughter Lee Hanson, was announced as a senate candidate in Tasmania for her mother's political party; UK, Ireland and New Zealand doctors are to be fast tracked to practise in Australia under new rules but The Royal Australian College of General Practitioners said the move has "major risks" and could jeopardise patient safety (with Ahir Shah); 'Charlie's Heroes' Award: Cory Booker, for delivering the longest speech in US Senate history, lasting 25 hours and five minutes, in protest against Donald Trump's second term as president and the operations of Elon Musk's Department of Government Efficiency.
179	6	"Episode 6"	Tom Gleeson, Guy Williams, Rhys Nicholson, Zoë Coombs Marr	None	16 April 2025	605,000
Topics: Federal Election Leaders Debate with Prime Minister Anthony Albanese and Opposition leader Peter Dutton (with Tom Gleeson); US President Donald Trump announced a postponement of 90 days on his global trade tariffs after the global stock markets crashed continuously since Trump announced increased tariffs on numerous countries; Nine News presenter Peter Overton spat out a throat lozenge live on-air during an interview with Nine's political editor Charles Croucher and later explained the lozenge was for his recent vocal cord surgery but he misread the news bulletin run sheet, thinking his next guest was finance editor Chris Kohler with a package; Vox populi with Tasmanian voters and Jacqui Lambie for the 2025 Australian federal election (with Guy Williams); Jeff Bezos's Blue Origin launched his fiancée Lauren Sánchez into space for ten minutes onboard the New Shepard rocket with an all-female celebrity crew which included Katy Perry, Gayle King, Amanda Nguyen, Kerianne Flynn and Aisha Bowe; Prime Minister Anthony Albanese supported cafe owner Leighton Walters in Canada who was told by Canadian Food Inspection Agency to stop selling and serving Vegemite because it did not meet local standards; Candidate eligibility and qualifying as a candidate in an Australian election (with Rhys Nicholson); Voting in an Australian election (with Zoë Coombs Marr); 'Stories My Mum Sent Me'.
180	7	"Episode 7"	Melina Wicks, Rhys Nicholson, Margaret Pomeranz	None	23 April 2025	919,000
Topics: One Nation's leader Pauline Hanson fired up the barbeque as part her election campaign in Willowbank Raceway; National Party leader Bridget McKenzie claimed Russia and China want Anthony Albanese to win the 2025 Australian federal election and later apologised that the claim was wrong; The UK Supreme Court issued a historic and definitive ruling that the terms "woman" and "sex" in the Equality Act refer only to a biological female and to biological sex, in a case brought to the Supreme Court by the gender-critical campaign group 'For Women Scotland', which is backed financially by J. K. Rowling, after two Scottish courts rejected its arguments that the Equality Act’s definition of a woman was limited to people born biologically female; A viral TikTok trend sparked disorderly conduct from mostly adolescent male audiences in cinemas when the phrase "chicken jockey" from the film A Minecraft Movie is mentioned by Jack Black's character; Gentle Parenting technique (with Melina Wicks); Humanoid robotss joined thousands of runners at a half marathon in Beijing for the first time in a 21-kilometre course; Independent MP Bob Katter made an Easter Sunday video which criticised Coles and Woolworths for price gouging and refusing to display a Nativity scene pop-out which he gave to all supermarkets; Australian retirees may be among the wealthiest in the world (with Rhys Nicholson); The search is on for the next Pope following the death of Pope Francis at the age of 88 on Easter Monday 21 April 2025; Neurosurgeon Greg Malham resigned from his position and apologised after a video showed him tearing down and stomping on one of Kooyong Independent MP Monique Ryan's corflutes then showing "how to bury the body"; Peter Jordan, husband of Kooyong MP Monique Ryan, apologised after he was filmed removing an election sign belonging to rival Kooyong candidate Liberal Party's Amelia Hamer; Liberal Party's candidate for Kooyong, Amelia Hamer was accused of deception when she failed to disclose she had property portfolios as a landlord while she campaigned as being a renter; Married at First Sight on the Nine Network (with Margaret Pomeranz); 'Stories My Mum Sent Me'.
181	8	"Episode 8"	Bronwyn Kuss, Zoë Coombs Marr, Rhys Nicholson	None	30 April 2025	980,000
Topics: Tesla's CEO Elon Musk said he will spend less time in Washington DC slashing government costs and more time running the electric vehicle company, after a 71 per cent drop in net profit, compared to the same time a year earlier; A viral video of Elon Musk's four year old son named X, showed the young child telling US President Donald Trump "I want you to shut your f***ing mouth" and "You're not the President. You need to go away." during a press conference with Musk where Trump signed an executive order to continue downsizing the federal workforce; Political leaders have condemned far-right extremists booing and heckling during Bunurong man Uncle Mark Brown's 'Welcome to Country' speech at the ANZAC Day dawn service in Melbourne's Shrine of Remembrance, and VIC Police were later seen escorting prominent neo-Nazi Jacob Hersant away from the service; Research reveals longevity of life is mostly found in the world's Blue zones (with Bronwyn Kuss); Global leaders and hundreds of thousands of mourners attended Pope Francis's funeral in the Vatican City to mourn and pay respect to the one they called "the people's Pope"; Cardinals prepared to attend a Conclave to elect the next pontiff, following the death of Pope Francis; A Liberal Party truck wrapped in campaign material advertising Liberal candidate for Greenway Rattan Virk, crashed into an early voting centre in the Quakers Hill Community Centre, before a man was seen hastily removing Liberal Party campaign material from the truck; Voters complained about receiving unsolicited text messages from Clive Palmer's Trumpet of Patriots Party leading up to the 2025 Australian federal election as they never signed up to a mailing list, but political parties are exempt from the Spam Act and the Do Not Call Register, meaning they are allowed to send unsolicited text messages without an opt-out or unsubscribe option; Maximising productivity in the workplace (with Zoë Coombs Marr); US Defense Secretary Pete Hegseth reportedly shared details of a March 2025 attack on Yemen's Houthis in a second Signal message group chat that included his wife, brother and personal lawyer, following his first message where he shared the same details with The Atlantic editor-in-chief Jeffrey Goldberg who was included in a separate Signal chat by mistake; Parents of school-aged children are inundated with thousands of WhatsApp group chat messages from schools or other parents each year (with Rhys Nicholson); 'Charlie's Heroes' Award: Valerie the Dachshund, for surviving 540 days on Kangaroo Island after she went missing from a campsite, until she was found by Kangala Wildlife Rescue members.
182	9	"Episode 9"	Noah Szto, Julia Louis-Dreyfus, Geraldine Viswanathan, Rhys Nicholson	None	7 May 2025	1,066,000
Topics: Joe Exotic also nicknamed 'Tiger King', who is in prison, said he endorsed Anthony Albanese to win the federal election in the hope Albanese would call US President Donald Trump to push for his release; Anthony Albanese won a second term as Prime Minister following a landslide win against Opposition leader Peter Dutton, who lost his seat of Dickson and the leadership of the Liberal Party in the 2025 Australian federal election; Clive Palmer's Trumpet of Patriots Party failed to win any seats in the election; Junior doctors in New South Wales went on strike over unsafe working conditions and unequal pay (with Noah Szto); US President Donald Trump celebrates his first 100 days of his second term as president despite criticisms for him pardoning convicted insurrectionists from the January 6 United States Capitol attack, attempting to take over Greenland, claiming Canada as the 51st state of America, renaming the Gulf of Mexico to the Gulf of America, being disrespectful to Ukraine President Volodymyr Zelenskyy when he visited Trump in the White House, deporting US citizens including a young girl with cancer, imposing trade tariffs across the globe which resulted in TRILLIONS of dollars wiped off the global stock market, huge drop in approval ratings for Trump as President, and Trump declared he wanted to be Pope following the death of Pope Francis; Sixty contestants from 14 different countries gathered in the coastal town of De Panne, Belgium for a chance to be crowned the best seagull imitator at the 5th European Gull Screeching Championship where the competition aims to create a positive image of the essential coastal birds, who are often despised by the public for their intrusive behaviour; Thunderbolts* film (with Julia Louis-Dreyfus and Geraldine Viswanathan); Nagi Maehashi of popular cooking website 'RecipeTin Eats' published a blog accusing Brooke Bellamy of copying two of her recipes in Bellamy's best-selling 'Bake with Brooki' cookbook released last year and she is one of many authors who claimed Bellamy plagiarised their recipes; Cocaine use is on the rise in Australia for the dopamine hit (with Rhys Nicholson); 'Stories My Mum Sent Me'.
183	10	"Episode 10"	Nicolette Minster, Concetta Caristo, Antony Green	None	14 May 2025	909,000
Topics: American born Robert Francis Prevost was elected the new Pope and adopted his papal name Pope Leo XIV in honour of Pope Leo XIII; US President Donald Trump announced a 100 percent tariff on all films produced outside of the United States but Trump has not yet met with Hollywood studio executives to discuss the tariffs; Perimenopause (with Nicolette Minster); Adam Bandt has lost his electoral seat of Melbourne and his leadership of the Australian Greens Party in the aftermath of Anthony Albanese's landslide election victory; 'Stories My Mum Sent Me' for Mother's Day; Intervision 2025 (with Concetta Caristo); Ohio police found a pet raccoon named Chewy with a meth pipe in its mouth while it sat in the driver's seat of a car and police arrested a woman after a large amount of methamphetamine and crack cocaine was discovered in the vehicle with the raccoon; Members of The Liberal Party elected Sussan Ley as Leader of the Liberal Party of Australia to make her the first ever female leader of the party, winning with 29 votes to 25; The ABC's Chief Election Analyst Antony Green announced he will retire from his on-air role after the 2025 Australian federal election (with Antony Green).
184	11	"Episode 11"	Ben Lomas, Margaret Pomeranz, Rhys Nicholson	None	21 May 2025	978,000
Topics: Prime Minister Anthony Albanese visited Indonesia for talks with Indonesian President Prabowo Subianto regarding defence and security co-operation in the wake of a major defence pact signed by both countries in 2024 and the controversy over a reported Russian approach to base military aircraft in Indonesia's Papua province; US President Donald Trump took a four-day tour the Middle East, visiting Saudi Arabia, Qatar and the United Arab Emirates; Donald Trump accepted a luxurious Boeing 747-8 jet "as a gift" from Qatar and it will be used as the new Air Force One to transport Trump but legal experts questioned the scope of laws relating to gifts from foreign governments that aim to thwart corruption and improper influence; The Reserve Bank of Australia decided to reduce the cash rate by 0.25 of a percentage point, to 3.85 per cent, taking the cash rate below 4 per cent for the first time in two years (with Ben Lomas); Eleven year old boy Fin Spicer's obsession with big Mack Trucks led to a special visit to the Brisbane Truck Show and being interviewed on radio and television; Kim Kardashian testified in the trial of the burglars accused of tying her up and robbing her at gunpoint nearly nine years ago, and she told the Paris court that she "absolutely thought" her assailants would kill her; The Papal inauguration of Pope Leo XIV on 18 May 2025; Hard Quiz on ABC (with Margaret Pomeranz); Prime Minister Anthony Albanese met with Ukraine President Volodymyr Zelenskyy after the Pope's inauguration in Rome to assure Zelenskyy that Abrams tanks are now "on the way" to Ukraine to help push back Russia's invasion; Prime Minister Anthony Albanese met briefly with Pope Leo XIV after the papal inauguration mass and told the new pontiff that his late mother would be "looking down from heaven with the biggest smile she's ever had", watching him attending the mass as prime minister; Ukrainian and Russian delegates arranged to meet in Istanbul for peace talks after Russia's Vladimir Putin refused to attend which led to Ukraine's Volodymyr Zelenskyy and Donald Trump not attending; A global outbreak of Measles has reached Australia after medical professionals urged travellers to stay vigilant amid a global rise in cases in the United States and other parts of the world; The Coalition broke up and The National Party leader David Littleproud was unhappy about the direction of the Liberal Party after their crushing defeat by the Labor Party in the federal election; Cosmetic injectibles (with Rhys Nicholson).
185	12	"Episode 12"	Alex Ward, Jimmy Barnes, Rhys Nicholson	None	28 May 2025	807,000
Topics: The 2026 Enhanced Games, which allows athletes to use performance-enhancing substances, were announced to be held in Las Vegas from 21-24 May 2026 with huge cash incentives being offered to athletes who compete; Ange Postecoglou's Tottenham Hotspur defeated Manchester United to win UEFA Europa League final 1-0, ending Tottenham Hotspur's 17-year trophy drought; 2026 AFC Women's Asian Cup (with Alex Ward); New album Defiant (with Jimmy Barnes); Former US Vice President Kamala Harris was seen dining at the Bathers' Pavilion in Balmoral, with her husband Doug Emhoff and she was in Australia to speak at a real estate conference on the Gold Coast; US President Donald Trump made false claims of "white genocide" in South Africa during a meeting with South African President Cyril Ramaphosa which were promptly refuted by Ramaphosa; Complaining (with Rhys Nicholson); 'Stories My Mum Sent Me'.

=== The Yearly with Charlie Pickering ===
No. overall	No. in season	Title	Featured guest	International correspondent	Original release date	Australia viewers (millions)
21	1	"Episode 1"	Harrison Ford, Karl Stefanovic	Loyiso Gola, Tiff Stevenson	16 December 2015	592,000
36	2	"Episode 2"	Sunny Munn, Adam Briggs, Randy Feltface, Cory Bernardi	Jonathan Pie (Tom Walker)	14 December 2016	646,000
57	3	"Episode 3"	Sarah Ferguson, Barrie Cassidy, Leigh Sales, Lee Lin Chin, Peter Helliar, Eddie McGuire, Yassmin Abdel-Magied, Sophie Monk, Sammy J, Randy Feltface, Anthony Callea, Tim Campbell, Lisa Wilkinson, Peter FitzSimons, Dave Hughes, Holly Ife, Adam Briggs, Rhys Nicholson	Jonathan Pie (Tom Walker)	20 December 2017	547,000
78	4	"Episode 4"	Sarah Ferguson, Roy and HG, Adam Briggs, Sammy J, Randy Feltface, Dave Hughes, Dave O'Neil, Denise Scott, John Lane, Rove McManus, Kerri-Anne Kennerley, John Wood, Kate McLennan, Kate McCartney, Hamish Blake, Mark Humphries, Dilruk Jayasinha, Nazeem Hussain, Luke McGregor, Fiona O'Loughlin, Emily Taheny, Virginia Trioli, Michael Rowland, Samuel Johnson	None	19 December 2018	581,000
93	5	"Episode 5"	Bill Shorten, Roy and HG, Sammy J, Dave Hughes, Denise Scott, Dilruk Jayasinha, Rhys Nicholson, Anthony Lehmann, Beverley O'Connor, Amanda McKenzie	Andy Zaltzman	18 December 2019	583,000
108	6	"Episode 6"	Pia Miranda, Greg Larson, Tegan Higginbotham, Jack Charles, Richard Pyros, Nick Russell, Sammy J, Dave Hughes, Lisa Millar, David Speers, Geraldine Hickey, Beverley O'Connor, Judith Lucy, Luke McGregor	Baratunde Thurston, Andy Zaltzman	23 December 2020	532,000
125	7	"Episode 7"	Denise Scott, Peter Helliar, Tony Armstrong, Roy and HG, Zoë Coombs Marr, Margaret Pomeranz, Anthony Lehmann, Dr. Jessica Kaufman (Vaccine Uptake researcher)	Andy Zaltzman	22 December 2021	406,000
138	8	"Episode 8"	Tony Armstrong, Roy and HG, Gabbi Bolt, Margaret Pomeranz, Larry Emdur	Jonathan Pie (Tom Walker)	21 December 2022	443,000
158	9	"Episode 9"	Rhys Nicholson, Roy and HG, Virginia Gay, Dilruk Jayasinha, Margaret Pomeranz, Rhonda Burchmore	Andy Zaltzman, Tamara Dhia	20 December 2023	400,000
173	10	"Episode 10"	Rhys Nicholson, Roy and HG, Concetta Caristo, Margaret Pomeranz	Andy Zaltzman	18 December 2024	1,007,000
186	11	"Episode 11"	Rhys Nicholson, Tom Gleeson, Abbey Gelmi, Margaret Pomeranz, Alexei Toliopoulos	Andy Zaltzman	23 December 2025	1,072,000
