= Steve Sammartino =

Australian futurist, author and entrepreneur

Steve Sammartino is an Australian futurist, author and entrepreneur.

== Sharing economy ==
According to Forbes, Sammartino launched Rentoid in 2007, one of the early sharing-economy, peer-to-peer online hire and rental marketplaces. Rentoid was featured in Rachel Botsman and Roo Rogers's book What’s Mine is Yours: How Collaborative Consumption is Changing the Way We Live. Rentoid was later sold to an ASX listed company in 2014.

== Experimental projects ==
According to the World Records Academy, Sammartino collaborated with Raul Oiada in 2011 to launch the world's first Lego Space Shuttle into space. Propelled by a helium-filled weather balloon, the Lego Space Shuttle model 3367 was launched from German airspace into the stratosphere to an altitude of about 35,000 meters (114,800 feet). According to Wired and ABC, in 2013 Sammartino and Oaida developed the world's first life-sized, drive-able Lego car with a compressed air-powered Lego engine.

== Books ==
- The Great Fragmentation: And Why the Future of Business Is Small (Wiley, 2014), ISBN 978-0730312680
- The Lessons School Forgot: How to Hack Your Way Through the Technology (Wiley, 2017), ISBN 978-0730343202

== TV shows ==
In November 2020, Sammartino co-wrote and co-hosted The Rebound on the Nine Network, airing nationally in Australia and also in New Zealand. The Rebound is a business and technology television show on strategy for organizations and careers in the digital era. In July 2021, a second series commenced broadcast nationally on the Nine Network in Australia.
