= 10 Late News =

Australian television series

- Also known as: Ten Second Edition News (1991–1993); Ten Late News (1994–2013); Ten Eyewitness News Late (2013–14)
- Genre: News
- Presented by: Ursula Heger
- Theme music composer: Les Gock
- Opening theme: 10 News Theme
- Country of origin: Australia
- Original language: English
- No. of seasons: 23

Production
- Running time: 30 minutes

Original release
- Network: Network 10
- Release: 2 January 1991 – 30 September 2011
- Release: 4 June 2012 – 23 May 2014
- Release: 29 April 2024 – present

Related
- 10 News

10 Late News is an Australian late night television news program, broadcast on Network 10. The revived bulletin is presented by Ursula Heger and airs first on 10 from 29 April 2024, streaming live on 10 and YouTube at 10 pm AEST, followed by a delayed broadcast on television at 10:30 pm local time.

Originally launched in 1991 and cancelled twice, the bulletin has previously been known as Ten Second Edition News, Ten Late News and Ten Eyewitness News Late. Between 2006 and 2011, the Monday–Thursday evening bulletins were merged with Sports Tonight, with the two bulletins remaining separate on Friday evenings.

== Presenters ==
Presenter	Role	Tenure
Eric Walters	News	1991
Anne Fulwood	News	1991–1995
Sandra Sully	News	1995–2010, 2011
Charmaine Dragun (Friday)	News	2005–2007
Ryan Phelan	Sport	2006
Kathryn Robinson (Friday)	News	2007–2011
Hamish Macdonald	Host	2012–2013
Brad McEwan	Sport	2007–2011, 2012–2013
Hermione Kitson	News	2012–2013
Danielle Isdale	Host	2013
Hugh Riminton	Host/News	2014
Victoria Murphy	Sport	2013–2014
Ursula Heger	Host (Monday-Thursday)	2024–present
Taylor Ryan	Host (Friday)	2025–present
Josh Holt	Weather	2024–present

== History ==
=== 1991–2011 ===
Network 10 began airing national late night news bulletins on 2 January 1991. Part of the network's coverage of the First Gulf War later in January 1991, resulted in the bulletin having extensive use of the network's rights to carry CNN material. Originally called Ten Evening News: Second Edition, the bulletin's first host was veteran newsreader Eric Walters, who was also presenting the 6pm weeknight bulletin in Sydney at the time.

Walters presented Ten Late News for four months, after which, Good Morning Australia news presenter Anne Fulwood took over as presenter of what had now become Ten Second Edition News. The program's straightforward style and format was a clear point of difference with competing programs on rival networks, Seven's chat show Tonight Live with Steve Vizard (which included short news bulletins) and Nine's The World Tonight with Clive Robertson, quickly drawing attention and viewers. Ten's late night news would gradually introduce its own elements including business reports with Robert Gottliebsen and weather forecasts with Ray Wilkie.

Over the next few years, rival networks introduced their own late night news programs, such as the Nine Network's Nightline and Seven Nightly News: Late Edition, initially competing directly with Ten's bulletin. In October 1995, Anne Fulwood resigned from Network Ten to join the Seven Network to present Seven Nightly News: Late Edition – her replacement was Sandra Sully, who would go on to host Ten Late News for most of the next 16 years.

Ten Late News also aired on weekend evenings at around 11pm, hosted by Tracey Spicer for more than a decade, until the axing of the Saturday edition in 2004 and the Sunday edition a year later. At the time, Network Ten were the only network in Australia to broadcast a late night news program at weekends, whilst other networks would continue to air updates until mid to late evening. In February 2006, the bulletin was merged with the late weeknight edition of Sports Tonight on Monday to Thursday and sport was presented by Ryan Phelan (later Brad McEwan). Charmaine Dragun (co-host of Ten News at Five in Perth) was a regular presenter of the Friday edition of the Late News from 2005 until her death in November 2007 – her replacement was Kathryn Robinson.

In September 2011, the network announced that due to declining ratings and increased competition, the bulletin would be axed. The last edition of Ten Late News, presented by Tim Webster, aired on Friday 30 September 2011. However, the final Monday to Thursday (Sandra Sully & Brad McEwan) Bulletin aired the previous day on Thursday 29 September 2011. Main host Sandra Sully became co-host of Sydney's Ten News at Five, replacing Deborah Knight.

=== 2012–2014 ===
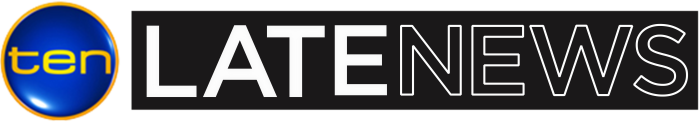
Logo used from June 2012 until June 2013 (Ten used a variation of this logo until September 2013)

The bulletin was revived on 4 June 2012 at 10:30 pm in a new 45-minute magazine-style format, presented by Hamish Macdonald. The program was announced under the name Ten Newsnight, but due to a rights issue with the Nine Network, its name was changed back to Ten Late News. It was very different from the former Late News format but unique in how it is presented and what it entails. It starts off with an introduction by the host; then the national news with the news presenter; a major report – introduced by the host; various feature stories; occasional interviews; special segments throughout the week, including Entertainment with Angela Bishop; sport; Twitter or Internet news; weather and a music item to conclude.

In September 2013, Danielle Isdale replaced Hamish Macdonald after he resigned and the bulletin was renamed Ten Eyewitness News: Late.

In February 2014, Network Ten announced that Hugh Riminton would replace Danielle Isdale as presenter, and Victoria Murphy would become the sports presenter. The format would return to a standard bulletin instead of the magazine-style format previously used.

Fill in presenters include Sandra Sully (News) and Matt Suleau (Sport).

On 21 May 2014, in a move by Network Ten to make budget cuts, Ten Eyewitness News: Late was axed.

=== 2024–present ===
In November 2017, the rights to the 1991–2014 broadcasts were transferred to U.S. company CBS Corporation, after they took over Network Ten, with CBS subsequently re-merging with Viacom to form ViacomCBS in 2019 (renamed Paramount Global in 2022). In October 2023, Network 10 announced that it would return a late night news bulletin to its schedule in 2024, to be streamed first on 10Play and YouTube at 10:00 pm followed by an approximately half-hour delayed broadcast on the main channel from 10:30 pm, under the working title 10 at 10: The Late News.

On 17 April 2024, it was confirmed that the revival bulletin would premiere on 29 April 2024 as 10 Late News with Ursula Heger presenting. Amanda Hart, Taylor Ryan, Ashleigh Raper, Tallulah Thompson and John Paul Gonzo are fill-in presenters.

In 2026, the bulletin was expanded to one hour and its airing time brought forward to start at 9:30 pm. Since 25 May 2026, sport has been presented under the Sports Tonight banner, as was the case between 2006–11.

== See also ==
- 10 News
- Nightline
