= Hermione Kitson =

Australian news presenter and reporter (born 1984)

- Born: 1984 (age 41–42); New Zealand
- Occupation: Journalist
- Spouse: Francesco Barbuscia (m. 2015–present)

Hermione Kitson is an Australian news presenter and reporter.

== Career ==
Kitson studied Media/Communications at Sydney University and completed an internship at ABC Sydney News and Current Affairs.

=== Network Ten ===
Before joining Network Ten, Kitson worked as a reporter at WIN TV and as a reporter and newsreader at 2UE Radio Sydney.

Kitson joined Ten News in Melbourne in mid-2008, where she was a senior reporter for around four years. She reported on a range of stories, many of them headlines and major news items. Kitson also reported on a number of breaking news events, both live and from the newsroom.

In August 2010, Kitson presented her first on-air bulletin, filling-in for George Donikian on the Saturday edition of Ten News Melbourne (following Network Ten's AFL telecasts) and continued to occasionally fulfil this role until September. Thereafter she became a permanent fill-in presenter.

During her time in Melbourne, she was the main fill-in presenter for Helen Kapalos on Ten News at Five with Mal Walden (unless it was a special weekend edition or post-Christmas, where just a solo presenter was used). She also presented the local weekend bulletin in 2011, a position in which she gained key recognition as a presenter for Network Ten by audiences in Victoria.

Kitson has covered stories ranging from the Black Saturday bushfires to the south-east floods, the Occupy Melbourne riots to gangland violence, and marquee events such as the Spring Racing Carnival.

In June 2012, Kitson moved back to her home town of Sydney and was appointed news presenter on Ten Late News with Hamish Macdonald.

In September 2013, Kitson was appointed news presenter of Ten's Eyewitness News Weekend bulletin taking over from Natarsha Belling. In early 2014, veteran journalist Mike Munro succeeded the role.

In January 2014, Kitson was appointed national presenter of Ten's Eyewitness News Early bulletin and Hugh Riminton was appointed presenter of Ten Eyewitness News Late.

Kitson was a highly regarded news presenter at Network Ten, having covered major stories and made numerous reports over five and a half years.

Kitson took voluntary redundancy in May 2014, following further mass cuts at the Network. She presented her final news bulletin following Studio 10 on the Friday when the majority of the 2014 morning line-up was axed.

=== Seven Network ===
In December 2014, Kitson made her first appearance on Seven News, making it official she would be joining the Seven Network via Twitter.
