= 10 News =

News and current affairs service of Network 10 in Australia

- Division of: Network 10
- Opening Theme: "10 News theme" by Les Gock (1994–present)
- Founded: 2 August 1964; 62 years ago
- Headquarters: Pyrmont, Sydney, New South Wales
- Area served: Australia
- Formerly called: Eyewitness News (1960s–1988, 1989); Ten Evening News (1989–1990); Ten News (1988, 1994–2013, 2025–present); Ten Eyewitness News (1991–1994, 2013–2018); 10 News First (2018–2025)
- Broadcast programs: 10 News: Lunchtime; 10 News; 10 News+; 10 Late News
- Key People: Martin White (Head of Broadcast News)
- Parent: Network Ten Pty Limited (Paramount Networks UK & Australia)
- Website: 10.com.au/news

10 News is the national news and current affairs division of Network 10. Its flagship program airs at 5:00 pm on weekday evenings, with editions produced from studios in Sydney, Melbourne, Brisbane, Adelaide and Perth. National bulletins are presented from the network's main studios in Pyrmont, Sydney.

The news division also draws upon the resources of CBS News, and among non-Paramount Skydance sources, ITN (which produces 5 News in the United Kingdom, which is owned by Paramount), the Associated Press Television News and Reuters for select international coverage.

== History ==
Network 10's news service was introduced on 2 August 1964 with the launch of ATV-10 in Melbourne, followed on 5 April 1965 by TEN-10 in Sydney.

The network was the first to introduce dual-anchored hour-long news bulletins in the form of Eyewitness News from 1973 onwards. The 1980s were the network's most successful period as a news provider with its local Sydney, Melbourne and Brisbane bulletins often rating highest for their 6 pm timeslots. Network 10's flagship national nightly bulletin news services has undergone a number of name changes since inception in 1965 including: Ten News, Ten Evening News, and Ten Eyewitness News, whilst state bulletins titles have included ATV News in Melbourne, SASNEWS in Adelaide and Newswatch in Brisbane.

A major change to the service occurred on 20 January 1992 when all five of its local bulletins were moved to the 5 pm time slot. In 1994, all local weekend bulletins were axed across the network and replaced by a 30-minute network bulletin from Sydney – Ten Weekend News, initially presented by John Gatfield and later by Tracey Spicer, Natarsha Belling and Bill Woods.

10 News has often been described as a 'training ground' for some of Australia's best-known television journalists. Some of the best-known reporters and presenters who launched or spent a major part of their careers at Network 10 include Jana Wendt, Kerry O'Brien, Katrina Lee, Charles Slade, Ann Sanders, Steve Liebmann, Tim Webster, Ron Wilson, Anne Fulwood, Juanita Phillips, Harry Potter, Liz Hayes, Jo Pearson, David Johnson, Bill McDonald, Chris Masters, Larry Emdur, Eddie McGuire, John Gatfield, Kay McGrath, Graeme Goodings, Sharyn Ghidella, Laurie Oakes, Geraldine Doogue, Helen Kapalos, Jennifer Keyte, Deborah Knight, Bruce McAvaney, Nathan Templeton, Mel McLaughlin, Karl Stefanovic, Mark Beretta, Amber Sherlock and George Donikian amongst others.

In September 2010, the network announced a major expansion of its news service. From 24 January 2011, It expanded its evening news output by introducing a national current affairs program at 6 pm, 6PM with George Negus (later 6.30 with George Negus), and an additional local bulletin at 6:30 pm on weeknights, under the Ten Evening News brand. In addition, the network announced the re-introduction of local weekend bulletins at 6 pm and the axing of its 5 pm national bulletin.

Two months after the relaunch, the national weekend bulletins were re-introduced owing to poor ratings, although the 6 pm local bulletins continued to air. Later that month, the network dropped its 6:30 pm local bulletins on weeknights, extended Ten News at Five to 90 minutes and moved George Negus' program to 6:30 pm each weeknight. The changes were introduced on Monday 4 April 2011.

Further changes in September 2011 saw the axing of the network's late night bulletin and the state-based 6 pm weekend bulletins. The 5 pm national bulletin on Saturdays and Sundays was extended to 90 minutes a month later. Later that month, the network axed 6.30 with George Negus and replaced it with an hour-long version of The 7PM Project (renamed The Project). In November 2011, the last half-hour of Network 10's 5 pm state bulletins were rebranded as Ten News at Six. Two months later, the main 5 pm bulletin was shortened back to 60 minutes from Sunday 22 January 2012 with The Project moved to 6 pm.

The network's Ten Early News bulletin was axed in February 2012 following the launch of Network 10's Breakfast program. More changes during the year saw the return of a networked Ten Late News in a new format launched on 4 June 2012, and the axing of Breakfast on 30 November 2012, due to low ratings and cost-cutting measures at the network.

On 15 September 2013, Network 10 reintroduced the Ten Eyewitness News branding for all of its news output, including the flagship 5 pm state bulletins. Two months later, a new breakfast program, Wake Up, was launched.

On 21 May 2014, Network 10 announced it would axe Wake Up and all national news bulletins on weekdays as part of a wider cost-cutting program with the loss of around 150 jobs, caused by poor ratings and advertising revenue. The network also closed its two international bureaux in Los Angeles and London. As of 2018, the state-based 5 pm news continues to air, alongside national bulletins at weekends.

In February 2014, Network 10 announced that Hugh Riminton would join Sandra Sully as a co-anchor of the bulletin. In November 2014, Candice Wyatt joined Stephen Quartermain as a co-anchor and finally in August 2015 Lachlan Kennedy joined Georgina Lewis as a co-anchor in Brisbane.

On 16 May 2016, Ten Eyewitness News updated their set and graphics. However, the logo remained unchanged.

In January 2017, the three east coast metro bulletins (Sydney, Melbourne and Brisbane) returned to solo anchors with Hugh Riminton, Candice Wyatt and Lachlan Kennedy returning to reporting duties in February.

On 1 November 2018, alongside a major network relaunch, the Ten Eyewitness News branding was replaced with 10 News First.

On 2 December 2019, the 5 pm edition of 10 News First was extended to 90 minutes.

On 11 August 2020, 10 announced it would transfer studio presentation of the Brisbane and Perth bulletins to Sydney with the Adelaide bulletin moved to Melbourne. Reporters, camera crews and editorial staff were retained in Adelaide, Brisbane and Perth. Between February 2023 and August 2024, the changes were periodically reversed, with the Adelaide and Melbourne bulletins reinstated as separate editions that month, production of the Perth bulletin returning to Subiaco the following month, and the Sydney and Brisbane bulletins reinstated as separate editions from September 2024.

In October 2023, 10 announced that its flagship 5:00 pm bulletins would be reduced to 60 minutes from 2024, to make room for a revival of Deal or No Deal while it also reintroduced a late night news bulletin, which is streamed live digitally via 10 and YouTube ahead of a delayed broadcast on the main channel. An afternoon bulletin, titled 10 News First: Afternoons, was also introduced in 2024, premiering on 29 January 2024.

On 16 June 2025, Network 10 announced it would be rebranding its news division to 10 News, alongside the announcement of the new public affairs program named 10 News+ which premiered on 30 June 2025.

On 22 July 2026, Network 10 announced that it would re-extend its flagship 5:00 pm bulletins to 90 minutes once again, as of 10 August 2026, with 10 News+ being reduced to air only on Sunday evenings in the wake of poor ratings.

== National bulletins ==
=== 10 News: Lunchtime ===
10 News: Lunchtime is an hour-long bulletin airing weekdays at 1:00 pm, presented from the network's Sydney studios by Angela Bishop with good news presented by Daniel Doody and weather presented by Josh Holt. Initially airing at 12:00 pm and titled 10 News First: Midday, the bulletin launched on Monday 9 January 2023, transitioning from the 10 News First: Breakfast bulletin axed in December 2022. The bulletin was moved to 1:00 pm from Monday 19 August 2024 and renamed 10 News First: Lunchtime. Fill-in presenters for the bulletin include Ursula Heger, Kate Freebairn, Georgie Tunny, Amelia Brace, Taylor Ryan, Samantha Butler, and Jennifer Keyte. On 30 June, due to Network 10 rebranding itself, 10 News First: Lunchtime renamed to 10 News: Lunchtime.

=== 10 Late News and Sports Tonight ===
10 Late News is an hour-long bulletin airing weeknights at 9:30 pm, presented from the network's Sydney studios by Ursula Heger (Monday to Thursday) and Taylor Ryan (Friday), along with weather presenter Josh Holt. The bulletin is also streamed live on 10's streaming service and YouTube channel. Fill-in presenters include: Amanda Hart, Taylor Ryan, Ashleigh Raper, Tallulah Thompson and Johnpaul Gonzo.

The network's first late news bulletin, Ten Evening News: Crisis in the Gulf, was hosted by veteran newsreader Eric Walters and was part of the network's coverage of the First Gulf War in January 1991. Walters hosted for four months before being replaced by Anne Fulwood as host of the 30-minute Ten Second Edition News, later Ten Late News, at 10:30 pm until her resignation to join the Seven Network in November 1995, whereupon she was replaced by Sandra Sully, who would go on to host the bulletin for most of the next 16 years. The bulletin also aired on weekends, hosted by Tracey Spicer, until the Saturday and Sunday editions were axed in 2004 and 2005 respectively.

In 2006, the bulletin was merged with the late weeknight edition of Sports Tonight on Monday through Thursday nights. Due to declining ratings and increased competition, the bulletin was axed with the final week of episodes hosted by Sandra Sully (news) and Brad McEwan (Sports Tonight) on Monday through Thursday, and Tim Webster on Friday 30 September 2011. Sully became co-host of Sydney's evening bulletin alongside Bill Woods.

The bulletin was revived on 4 June 2012 in a new magazine-style format, hosted by Hamish Macdonald. In September 2013, the bulletin was rebranded as Ten Eyewitness News: Late and Danielle Isdale replaced Macdonald after he resigned later that same month. Hugh Riminton later replaced Isdale as host and the bulletin returned to a standard news bulletin format. The bulletin was again axed in May 2014 alongside the early and morning news bulletins.

The bulletin was revived again on 29 April 2024, as a half-hour bulletin airing weeknights. The bulletin was streamed live on 10's streaming service and YouTube channel at 10:00 pm AEST, followed by a delayed broadcast on television at approximately 10:30 pm local time.

In 2026, the bulletin was expanded to one hour and brought forward to air at 9:30 pm. Since 25 May 2026, sport has been presented under the Sports Tonight banner, as was the case between 2006–11. This segment is presented by either Max Burford or Adrian Franklin on a rotating basis.

=== Weekend edition ===
The weekend edition of 10 News airs on Saturday and Sunday evenings at 5 pm and is presented from the network's Sydney studios by Georgie Tunny with sport presenter Scott Mackinnon and weather presenter Amanda Jason.

The national bulletin was introduced in 1994 to replace state-based bulletins (excluding Adelaide and Perth, who had state-based weekend bulletins until early 1996) but axed in January 2011 ahead of the reintroduction of local editions at 6 pm. The national edition was reinstated two months later in the wake of poor ratings. The 6 pm local bulletins continued to air until October 2011 when the 5 pm national news was extended to 90 minutes.

Until July 2014, a separate edition for Perth and Western Australia was also broadcast from the Pyrmont studios in Sydney. The lack of a separate up-to-date edition of Ten Eyewitness News Weekend for Perth has led to criticisms when outdated time-sensitive news has been broadcast in Western Australia, as in the case of a local 8-year-old junior drag racing accident victim who had died in hospital several hours prior to Ten airing the three-hour-old national bulletin reporting that she was still alive. Localised Sydney-produced weekend editions were restored for Perth and Western Australia by late 2018. Then weeknight presenter Narelda Jacobs presented the Perth edition until she was reappointed to present the weeknight bulletins for Perth in September 2020; Bath would present both the national and Perth editions of the weekend news ever since. In April 2026, the separate Perth bulletin presented on weekends moved production to Subiaco, and is presented by Jacobs.

In December 2018, it was announced that Natarsha Belling would move to Studio 10 in 2019 to present news updates throughout the show. Belling was replaced by Chris Bath.

In October 2025, Network 10 announced it would not renew Chris Bath's contract as part of a broader cost-cutting initiative. She would remain with network until December.

The bulletin has previously been presented by Chris Bath, Natarsha Belling, Hermione Kitson, Mike Munro, Matt Doran, Bill Woods, Steve Liebmann, Tracey Spicer and John Gatfield.

Fill-in presenters include Amanda Hart, Taylor Ryan, Ashleigh Raper and Tallulah Thompson (news), and Chloe-Amanda Bailey (sport).

=== 10 News Updates ===
Short, localised updates air late afternoons and early evenings by each capital city's main newsreader Monday to Friday, with national updates originating from Sydney over the weekend.

== Online presence ==
10 News has a YouTube channel that shares clips from 10 News and 10 News+ programs. The channel has approximately 1.06 million subscribers as of 2025.

== Capital-based bulletins ==
=== Sydney ===
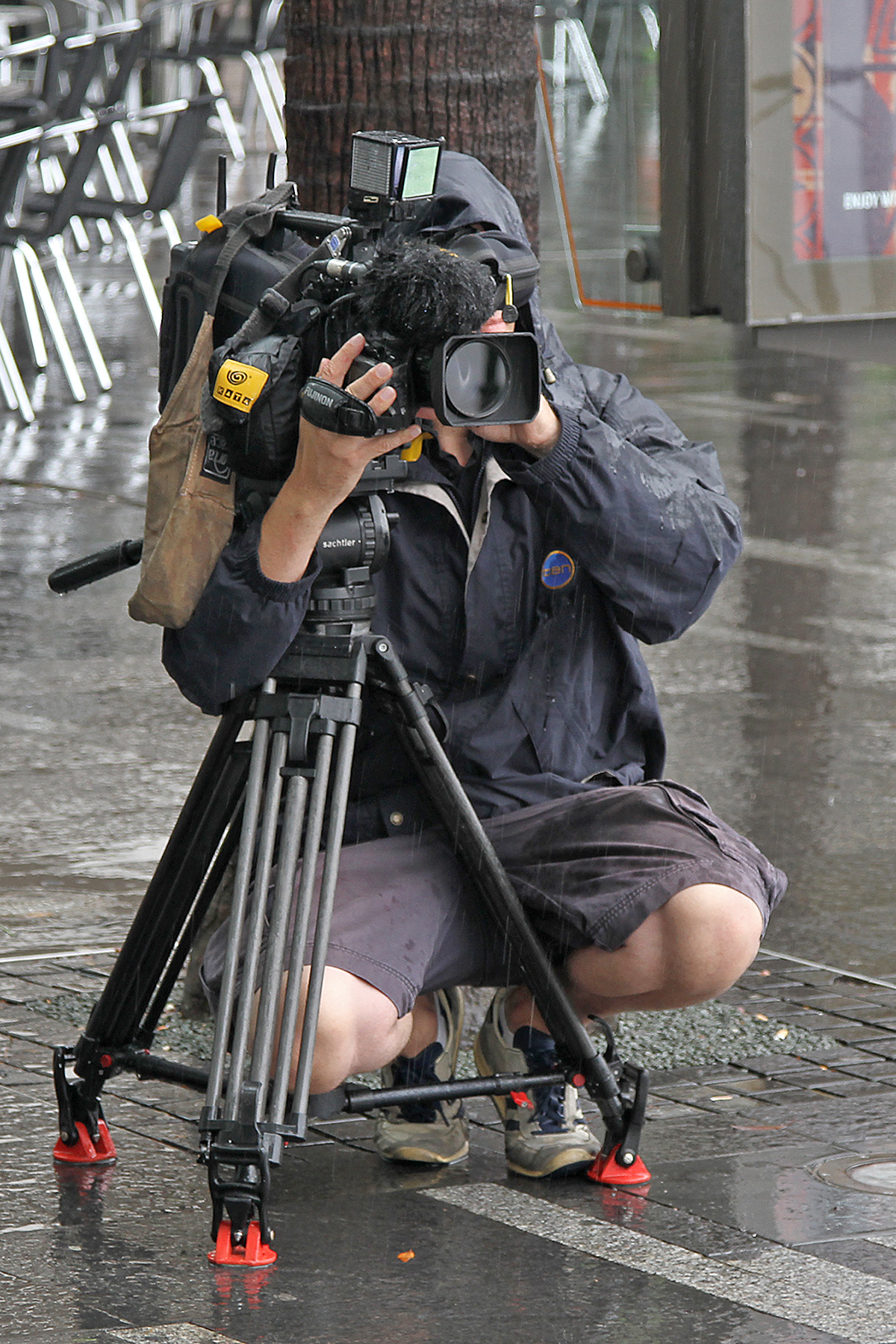
Network 10 camera operator filming at Sydney's Circular Quay

10 News Sydney is presented from TEN-10's Sydney studios at Pyrmont by Sandra Sully with sport presenter Tara Rushton and weather presenter Josh Holt.

The Sydney edition is simulcast on 10 Northern NSW in Northern New South Wales and in Griffith via 10 Griffith, and across Southern New South Wales and the Australian Capital Territory via 10 Southern NSW and ACT.

Between 1995 and 2005, the bulletin was presented by Ron Wilson and Jessica Rowe, until Rowe moved to co-host Today on the Nine Network. She was replaced by former US correspondent Deborah Knight in 2006. Wilson moved to the national Early News bulletin, after presenting his final 5 pm Sydney bulletin as main anchor on Friday 16 January 2009.

In October 2011, Sandra Sully replaced Deborah Knight following the axing of Ten Late News. Knight left the network to join the Nine Network as a Nine News presenter and Weekend Today as a news presenter.

Bill Woods left the network on 30 November 2012 after his contract was not renewed as part of cost-cutting measures. Ron Wilson was also set to leave on the same day, however he stayed until 28 December that year as he presented his final bulletin for Ten News after being employed there for 34 years. He then moved back to radio in April 2013 as a newsreader and radio announcer for smoothfm. In February 2014, Hugh Riminton joined Sandra Sully as a co-anchor, but returned to reporting three years later when the bulletin returned to a solo-anchor format.

In September 2020, studio production for the Sydney bulletin was merged with the Brisbane bulletin with opt-outs for local news, sport and weather alongside shared content; from 2 September 2024, the bulletins were separated and production of the Sydney bulletin resumed as a standalone edition, with the revived Brisbane bulletin returning to Mount Coot-tha.

Fill-in presenters include Ursula Heger and Georgie Tunny (news), Chloe-Amanda Bailey (sport), Taylor Ryan and Sarah Navin (weather).

=== Melbourne ===
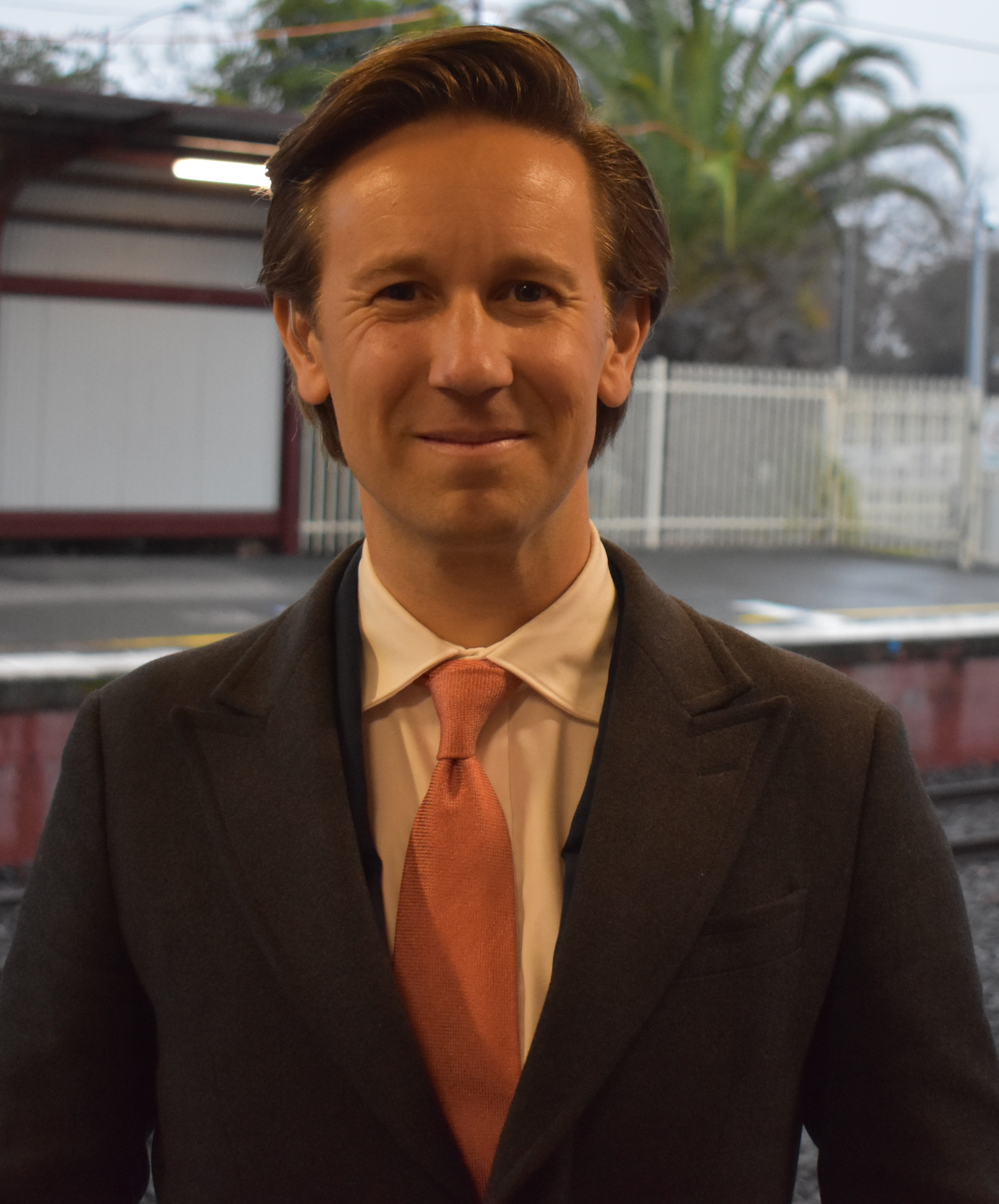
Rory Campbell, a reporter for 10 News, at Clifton Hill

10 News Melbourne is presented from ATV-10's Como Centre studios in South Yarra by Jennifer Keyte with sport presenter Stephen Quartermain (Monday to Thursday) and Caty Price (Friday) and weather presenter Jayde Cotic.

The network's Melbourne news operation was originally based at the Nunawading studios until a move to the Como Centre in 1992.

Mal Walden joined ATV-10 in April 1987, shortly after his abrupt sacking by HSV-7 – he took over the weekday 5 pm bulletin in 1996 alongside Jennifer Hansen who was replaced by Helen Kapalos in 2006. Kapalos was sacked in November 2012 amid cost-cutting measures at the network. Walden anchored the bulletin solo until his retirement in December 2013.

George Donikian was the main male fill-in during the 2000s, including presenting the Saturday 6 pm bulletin during the 2002–11 period that Network 10 had the AFL broadcasting rights. He retired in October 2011. Sport presenter Stephen Quartermain then assumed that role, though he had filled-in as news presenter during various times in the past, when Donikian was unavailable.

Mignon Stewart (née Henne) was the main female fill-in for Jennifer Hansen and Helen Kapalos during the 2000s (including for an extended stint in early 2006 before Kapalos started). There was no female fill-in for much of 2008 and 2009. Hermione Kitson became the female fill-in during 2010 and moved to Sydney in 2012.

During the 2000s, occasionally due to availability and network commitments, Walden or Kapalos would present solo (particularly after major events such as the AFL Grand Final).

Traffic Reporter Vanessa O'Hanlon left after six years (2003–2008) in 2008 for ABC News Breakfast. Emma Notarfrancesco left after four and a half years (2010–2015), to work for Formula 1's Australian media team on Friday 20 February 2015. Jimmy Wirtanen then returned to the role.

In November 2014, Candice Wyatt joined Stephen Quartermain as co-anchor of the bulletin, but returned to reporting just over two years later when the bulletin returned to a solo-anchor format.

In May 2018, Network 10 announced that Jennifer Keyte would leave the Seven Network to present the bulletin replacing Stephen Quartermain, who was redeployed to his former role of presenting sport on the bulletin.

Past presenters of Network 10's Melbourne news included David Johnston, who presented the flagship evening bulletin for 16 years (alongside the likes of Jana Wendt and Jo Pearson) until his departure for HSV-7 in 1996.

The Melbourne bulletin is simulcast across most of regional Victoria via 10 Regional Victoria, to the city of Mildura via 10 Mildura, most of metropolitan and regional Tasmania via 10 TDT, the south areas of Remote and Eastern Australia via 10 Central and to the city of Darwin via 10 Darwin.

In September 2020, studio production for the Melbourne bulletin was merged with the Adelaide bulletin with opt-outs for local news, sport and weather alongside shared content; the bulletins were separated and Melbourne returned to a solo bulletin on 3 February 2023.

Fill in presenters include Jayde Cotic and Stephen Quartermain (News), Adrian Franklin and Caty Price (Sport), Steph Baumgartel and Sophie Jacobson (Weather).

=== Brisbane (Queensland statewide) ===
10 News Queensland is presented from TVQ's studios at Mt Coot-tha by Sharyn Ghidella, with sport presenter Veronica Eggleton, and weather presenter Liz Cantor.

The Brisbane edition is simulcast across regional Queensland via 10 Regional Queensland, the Gold Coast via 10 Northern NSW and Gold Coast and the north areas of Remote and Central Australia via 10 Central. Reporters are also based at a remote newsroom on the Gold Coast.

In August 2015, Lachlan Kennedy joined Georgina Lewis as co-anchor of the bulletin, but returned to reporting merely eighteen months later when the bulletin returned to a solo-anchor format.

Former long-serving presenter Marie-Louise Theile left Ten News on 14 December 2007 to spend more time with her family. Other previous presenters include Geoff Mullins, Tracey Spicer, Brad McEwan and Bill McDonald, who left in November 2012 when his contract was not renewed due to cost-cutting measures.

In September 2020, studio production for the Brisbane bulletin was transferred to Sydney with a single bulletin containing opt-outs of local news, sport and weather for Sydney and Brisbane alongside shared content. Georgina Lewis, presenter of 13 years, and sports presenter Jonathan Williams were among those that were made redundant in the restructure with the final Brisbane-based bulletin broadcast on 11 September 2020.

On 15 August 2024, it was announced that a separate bulletin, presented from Ten's Mt Coot-tha studios, would be restored from 2 September 2024, with former reporter Sharyn Ghidella returning to the network after more than thirty years.

Fill in presenters include Pippa Sheehan, Georgina Hill (News), Josh McLean (Sport), Tiarni Reid and Brendan Smith (weather).

=== Adelaide ===
10 News Adelaide is presented from TEN-10's Sydney studios by Kate Freebairn (Monday-Thursday), and from ADS-10's Adelaide studios in Eastwood by Tiffany Warne (Friday), with sport presenter Max Burford and weather presenters Tiffany Warne (Monday-Thursday) and Josh Webster (Friday).

The Adelaide bulletin is simulcast to Port Lincoln, the Upper Spencer Gulf of South Australia and the city of Broken Hill in New South Wales via 10 Spencer Gulf and Broken Hill, and to the Riverland and the South East areas of South Australia via 10 South Australia.

In 2000, studio production for the 5 pm Adelaide bulletin was moved to the network's Melbourne studios in South Yarra. The bulletin was presented from Melbourne for the next decade while sport and weather segments were still presented locally from the station's studios in North Adelaide and subsequently, from 2007, in newly-built studios in Hutt Street. Initially, then-presenters George Donikian and Nikki Dwyer relocated from Adelaide to present the new Melbourne based bulletin. After 8 years co-anchoring with Donikian, Dwyer eventually resigned as presenter in late 2000 after she decided to move back to Adelaide, to begin starting a family. Dwyer was subsequently replaced as presenter by Kelly Nestor who resigned in 2006 and was succeeded by Rebecca Morse.

On 21 January 2011, George Donikian presented his final Melbourne-based bulletin for Ten News Adelaide. Studio presentation subsequently returned to ADS-10's Adelaide studios on 24 January 2011, to coincide with the launch of the short-lived 6:30 pm local bulletin. Rebecca Morse relocated with the bulletin to Adelaide while Donikian remained in Melbourne, co-presenting the Melbourne edition of Ten News at Five with Helen Kapalos for two months before being reduced to Fridays only, as well as presenting the localised weekend edition. Jane Reilly retired as weather presenter in April 2013 after 37 years and was succeeded by Kate Freebairn. A year later, Mark Aiston resigned as sport presenter.

In September 2020, studio production for the Adelaide bulletin was transferred back to Melbourne with a single bulletin containing opt-outs of local news, sport and weather for Adelaide and Melbourne alongside shared content. Rebecca Morse, presenter of 14 years, and sports presenter Will Goodings were among those that were made redundant in the restructure with the final Adelaide-based bulletin broadcast on 11 September 2020. In February 2022, the Adelaide newsroom was relocated to newly-built offices on Greenhill Road in Eastwood.

The Adelaide and Melbourne bulletins were separated on 3 February 2023; studio production of the Adelaide bulletin was moved to the network's Sydney studios, where Kate Freebairn is now based, to present a new solo bulletin for Adelaide.

Fill-in presenters include Tiffany Warne, Alan Murrell and Josh Webster (news), Jase Kemp and Jodie Oddy (sport), Josh Webster and Jessica Heatley (weather)

=== Perth ===
10 News Perth is presented from NEW-10's Perth studios in Subiaco by Natalie Forrest (Weeknights) and Narelda Jacobs (Weekends) with sports presenter Lachy Reid and weather presenter Beau Pearson.

The Perth bulletin is simulcast to most of regional Western Australia via 10 Western Australia.

Production of the Perth bulletin was initially moved to Pyrmont in 2000, citing high costs of converting the network's Dianella studios. Then-presenters Greg Pearce and Christina Morrissy relocated to Sydney to present the bulletin, whilst sport and weather segments were still presented locally from the station's studios in Dianella. Morrissy later resigned from these duties after suffering deep vein thrombosis on a flight and was replaced by Celina Edmonds. Pearce also later resigned to return to Perth, while Edmonds resigned to spend more time with her family. She then moved to Sky News Australia as a presenter and reporter.

Following their departures, Tim Webster and Charmaine Dragun became the main presenters of Ten News Perth from 2005. After Dragun's untimely death on 2 November 2007, Webster remained as the solo presenter and continued to present the bulletin until 2 May 2008, after which presenting duties were rotated between Ron Wilson, Narelda Jacobs, Deborah Knight and Sandra Sully in Sydney for the seven weeks between Webster's departure and the relocation of the bulletin back to Perth.

On 18 January 2008, it was announced that studio production of Ten News would return to Perth. The network denied that the move was related to the death of Charmaine Dragun as the decision to switch production had been made well beforehand. Narelda Jacobs began presenting in the Sydney studios in May 2008 before Ten News Perth presentation returned to the Dianella studios on Monday 23 June 2008.

In December 2016, Network 10 moved into new offices in Subiaco, relocating from Dianella.

In December 2019, it was announced that former Today Tonight presenter Monika Kos would replace Jacobs as anchor from 13 January 2020 with Jacobs to move to Sydney to co-host Studio 10.

In September 2020, studio production for the Perth bulletin was transferred back to Sydney with Narelda Jacobs returning as anchor. The bulletin continued to air live with sports news presented from the Perth newsroom.

On 13 March 2023, presentation of the Perth bulletin once again returned to the Subiaco studio as a trial, with Natalie Forrest as anchor. In December 2023, it was announced that the bulletin would remain in Perth.

Fill in presenters include Jess Brown, Estelle Lewis, Ezra Holt (News), Ashleigh Nelson, Steve Allen, Liz Robbins (Sport), Olivia Donaldson (Weather)

== Regional services ==
In 10's regional viewing areas, additional local news updates air at various times during the day and evening Monday to Friday. Updates are produced and recorded in both Sydney (Southern NSW & ACT) and Melbourne (Regional Victoria, Regional Queensland) since January 2026, with separate updates for the local areas within each state. Current presenters are Stacey Eldridge (ACT & Wollongong) and Caspar McLeod (Central West & Riverina), Sarah Bennallack (Border North East & Gippsland) and Lucy Glanville (Bendigo + Central Victoria & Ballarat + South West Victoria) and Mae James (Cairns, Townsville, Rockhampton, Sunshine Coast & Wide Bay). Fill-in presenters are Caspar McLeod (all regions), Steven Christie, Tex Reeks, and Elyce Holden.

These updates were previously produced in Hobart by former regional affiliate Southern Cross Austereo while transitioning from regional affiliate ownership to network ownership.

Following 10's acquisition of NRN Northern NSW & Gold Coast in May 2025, local updates currently continue to be produced and recorded in Wollongong by WIN News under 10 News branding since June 2025. The current presenters for the local updates are Madison Arnold and Lauren Ivory, with Georgia Elsley or Meg Claridge filling-in.

Updates in Tasmania are produced independently by Seven Tasmania, who co-own 10’s local affiliate TDT alongside WIN Tasmania. The current presenter is Madeline Kerr.

== Current affairs ==
=== 10 News+ ===
10 News+ is an in-depth current affairs program that airs Sunday at 6:30 pm and is presented from the network's Sydney studios by Denham Hitchcock and Amelia Brace. The program launched as a daily hour-long program as a replacement for The Project on Monday 30 June 2025. In addition to Hitchcock and Brace, Hugh Riminton, Ursula Heger Ashleigh Raper, Georgie Tunny, Carrie-Anne Greenbank, Johnpaul Gonzo and Harvey Biggs acted as substitute hosts, with Riminton and Heger hosting on Fridays.

In October 2025, Network 10 announced that 10 News+ will be cut from one hour to 30 minutes from 2026. In July 2026, Network 10 announced that 10 News+ would be reduced to air only on Sunday evenings. The weeknight editions were replaced by an extension to the main 5 pm bulletin, which would be extended to 90 minutes from 10 August.

Over the decades, Network 10 has experimented with a wide range of current affairs formats.

Former programs
Program	Tenure	Description
Good Morning Australia	1981–1992	A pioneering breakfast show that blended news, interviews, and lifestyle segments.
Meet the Press	1992–2013	A long-running political affairs program featuring interviews with key policymakers and commentators.
The Bolt Report	2011–2015	A commentary-driven show hosted by conservative columnist Andrew Bolt.
6.30 with George Negus	2011	A short-lived but ambitious attempt to deliver in-depth reporting in a prime-time slot.
Breakfast	2012	A morning news and talk show aimed at competing with established breakfast television formats.
Revealed	2013	A documentary-style series focused on investigative journalism.
Wake Up	2013–2014	A fresh take on morning television, broadcast from beachside locations.
The Project	2009–2025	A flagship hybrid of news and entertainment that ran for 16 years, known for its panel discussions and interviews with newsmakers and celebrities.

== Former bulletins ==
=== Breakfast news ===
10 News First: Breakfast aired weekdays at 8 am and was presented from the network's Sydney studios by Lachlan Kennedy (Monday – Wednesday) and from the network's Melbourne studios by Natasha Exelby (Thursday & Friday). The half-hour bulletin was launched on Monday 27 June 2022, but was discontinued December that year due to poor ratings and transitioned into the later-airing 10 News First: Midday (later 10 News First: Lunchtime) the following January.

=== Early news ===
The network's early morning news program began as Ten Early News in January 2006, airing for one hour at 6 am weekday mornings and featuring a number of segments unique to its timeslot, such as morning newspaper headlines from the country's major papers. The last edition aired on Wednesday 22 February 2012 in preparation of the earlier-than-scheduled launch of Network 10's Breakfast program. The bulletin was revived on 4 November 2013 as Ten Eyewitness News: Early, airing from 5:30 am to 6:30 am on weekdays, immediately preceding the network's new breakfast program Wake Up.

The bulletin was originally presented by Bill Woods until he became a presenter for the Sydney edition of Ten News at Five, switching roles with Ron Wilson in January 2009. For the revival, Hermione Kitson anchored alongside sports presenter Scott Mackinnon and weather presenter Amanda Jason.

The final edition of the early news aired on Friday 23 May 2014, when the bulletin was axed alongside Wake Up and the morning and late news bulletins.

=== Morning news ===
Ten originally aired a late morning news program from 1980 until cost-cutting measures led to its axing ten years later. It was revived in 1994 and presented by David Johnston from the Melbourne newsroom. From 1994–2000 and August – December 2005, Ten Morning News would air after the successful Good Morning Australia with Bert Newton. In 1996, Jason Cameron took over as presenter for the next four years until production was moved to 10's Pyrmont news centre in Sydney, where the bulletin was hosted by Tracey Spicer and Natarsha Belling. In 2004, the bulletin briefly moved to midday (then called Ten News at Noon) to compete against the Australian Broadcasting Corporation's own World at Noon – a decision which proved unpopular.

In 2007, after Tracey Spicer left the network the previous year, Natarsha Belling became the face of the bulletin and continued the role right through to the start of 2012.

During 2010 and 2011, the bulletin aired for one hour at 9 am, before The Circle. The bulletin was retired with the launch of Breakfast but returned upon the axing of The Circle in late August 2012, this time airing at 10 am on weekdays, presented by Ron Wilson.

Ten Morning News was axed again on Friday 30 November 2012, marking the final full-length national news to be presented by Ron Wilson after 33 years with Network 10. A morning news bulletin was again revived on 4 November 2013 with the launch of Ten Eyewitness News: Morning, anchored by Matt Doran with sports presenter Scott Mackinnon and weather presenter Amanda Jason.

Another round of cost-cutting measures led to the morning news being axed again on Friday 23 May 2014, alongside Wake Up and the early and late news bulletins.

=== Afternoon news ===
10 News: Afternoon was a half-hour bulletin that aired weekdays at 3:30 pm, presented from the network's Sydney studios by Narelda Jacobs with sport presenter Tara Rushton and weather presenter Josh Holt. The bulletin launched on Monday 29 January 2024. Fill-in presenters for the bulletin included Ursula Heger, Hugh Riminton, Kate Freebairn, Amanda Hart and Angela Bishop.

On 9 December 2025, it was announced that the bulletin would not return in 2026.

== Logo history ==
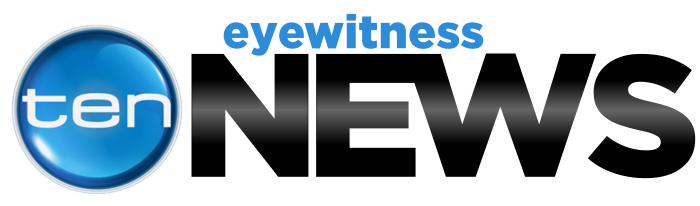
13 September 2013 – 31 October 2018

31 October 2018 – 29 June 2025

30 June 2025 – present
