= NEW (TV station) =

- Perth, Western Australia; Australia
- Channels: Digital: 11 (VHF); Virtual: 10
- Branding: 10

Programming
- Language: English
- Network: 10

Ownership
- Owner: Warner Bros. Discovery Asia-Pacific (Ten Network Holdings); (Network TEN (Perth) Pty Ltd)

History
- First air date: 20 May 1988
- Former call signs: WCW (changed to NEW prior to launch)
- Former channel number: Analog: 10 (VHF) (1988–2013)
- Call sign meaning: "New" with W for Western Australia

Technical information
- Licensing authority: Australian Communications and Media Authority
- ERP: 50 kW (digital)
- HAAT: 317 m (digital)
- Transmitter coordinates: 32°0′45″S 116°3′42″E

Links
- Website: 10.com.au

NEW-10 is a television station broadcasting in Perth, Western Australia, and is a member of Network 10.

NEW10 broadcasts in digital television on VHF Channel 11 from Carmel, located in the Perth Hills. Its studios are located in Subiaco. NEW broadcasts good quality 1080i high definition digital programming sourced from Sydney. The callsign NEW10 was chosen for promotional purposes when the station first launched.

The station's former studios in Dianella were formerly host to the facilities of the regional Western Australian television station WIN Television WA (from 1999 to 2007) until WIN Corporation bought out competitor STW-9 in June 2007 and moved all WA operations to their studios.

== History ==
NEW10 was the last of the Ten stations in major metropolitan cities to go to air. The reason for the late launch (in comparison to other VHF 0/10 stations, which were 20 years before) was the smaller market size. Though this was true in the early days of television, it ceased to be the case in the 1980s, by which time the Perth market exceeded Adelaide in value so a situation existed where two stations in Perth shared a market as large as that of three stations in Adelaide. Because the demand for air time was high, advertising rates were higher than in Adelaide. The Perth market was therefore very profitable for the stations but was providing viewers with less choice than they had in other capital cities. The case for a new licence was made to ACMA, then the Australian Broadcasting Tribunal by Brian Treasure, one of the founders of Western Australia's first television station TVW-7 who was sacked by a hostile board in 1975. In April 1984, the Minister for Communications, Michael Duffy, called for applications for a third licence.

Hearings ran from 1984 until 1986, with four applicants submitting bids. In the other corner were the existing stations, Seven outlet TVW and Nine Network outlet STW, attempting to defer or prevent the new licence from being granted. Seven and Nine were the only two commercial stations in Perth, and they wanted to keep it that way for as long as possible.

Treasure's West Coast Telecasters, funded by Kerry Stokes and Jack Bendat, was the successful applicant, defeating Western Television, in spite of Treasure being forced to resign as chairman due to a dispute with the Australian Taxation Office. Stokes sold the company to Frank Lowy's Northern Star Holdings before they went to air. The reason for this was a change in government policy.

In 1985 the government had removed the two cities requirement, making it possible for networks to own more than two capital city stations. In 1986 it increased the audience reach limits for networks from 60% to 75%, meaning that for the first time a coast-to-coast network of owned and operated stations was feasible. The increase was part of the Federal government's push for equalisation of television services and Australia's first satellite, AUSSAT was part of this initiative. Satellite revenue generated from national television networks was expected to be significant (though this was not initially the case) and would subsidise the provision of new services to regional and remote areas. Increasing the audience ownership limits meant national networks and therefore revenue streams for AUSSAT.

The possibility of truly national television networks, and misunderstandings as to the economic benefits of satellites, led to inflated ideas of their worth. Those wanting to establish national networks offered high premiums to smaller unaligned stations, leading to the new licence-holder in Perth being made an offer by Lowy, a newcomer to television networking.

The station commenced broadcasting on 20 May 1988, making Perth the last of the capital cities to get full network service. By this time, it had been scaled back without the massive local content that Treasure had wanted to produce, and despite some local programming for the first five years, became little more than a relay of network programming from Sydney.

The first news team included former Nine newsreader Greg Pearce, Alan Hynd, Gina Pickering, Peter Perrin, Debra Bishop, Ian Brayshaw and John Barnett.

In 1993 Frank Lowy sold his stations to a reformed Network Ten. Network Ten then divested CTCTV (Canberra), ADS10 (Adelaide) and NEW10 (Perth) from their direct control to comply with % ownership rules of the time. The stations were "sold" to Charles Curran Group who managed the triple as a proxy. CTCTV was sold to Southern Cross after a period, leaving ADS10 and NEW10 in Curran's control. Network Ten re-acquired ADS10 and NEW10 when ownership conditions were changed around 1996.

NEW10 commenced digital television transmission in January 2001 in line with other capital city digital transition, broadcasting on VHF Channel 11 while maintaining analogue transmission on VHF Channel 10.

The analogue signal for NEW was shut off at 9.00am WST, Tuesday, 16 April 2013.

On 2 December 2016, the final broadcast of Perth's 10 News took place from Dianella studios after more than 28 years.

On 5 December 2016, the station left Dianella after 28 years and moved to the state-of-the-art studios at 502 Hay Street in Subiaco.

== Digital multiplex ==
LCN	Service	SD/HD
1	10 HD	HD
10	10	SD
11	10 Comedy	SD
12	10 Drama	HD
13	Nickelodeon	SD
15	10 HD	HD
16	You.tv	SD
17	Gecko TV	SD

== Programming ==
=== Current in-house productions ===
- 10 News: Perth (1988–2001, 2008–2020, 2023–present)

=== Previous in-house productions ===
- The Western Front, a local AFL program produced in Perth during the AFL season since 2002 until 2011. Hosted by Tim Gossage and Lachy Reid, it is also seen in regional Western Australia on WIN Television
- AFL coverage: West Coast, Fremantle (2002–2011)
- Kids Company: Started as a Saturday morning kids show with cartoons and interviews in and around schools in Perth. With the introduction of Video Hits by the network, Kids Co. moved to week day afternoons. Hosted by Brent Meyer, Tod Johnston and Amanda De Pledge. (1988–1992, 3:30 p.m. weekdays) and stars Kenny Kidna from Kangaroo Creek Gang.
- Western Australia – At Your Service: Tourism program, hosted by Allan Symons (1998–1999, 5:30 p.m. Saturdays)
- Drivetime TV: Motoring show (2001–2005). Moved to TVW-7 in 2006.
- Airplay

== News and current affairs ==
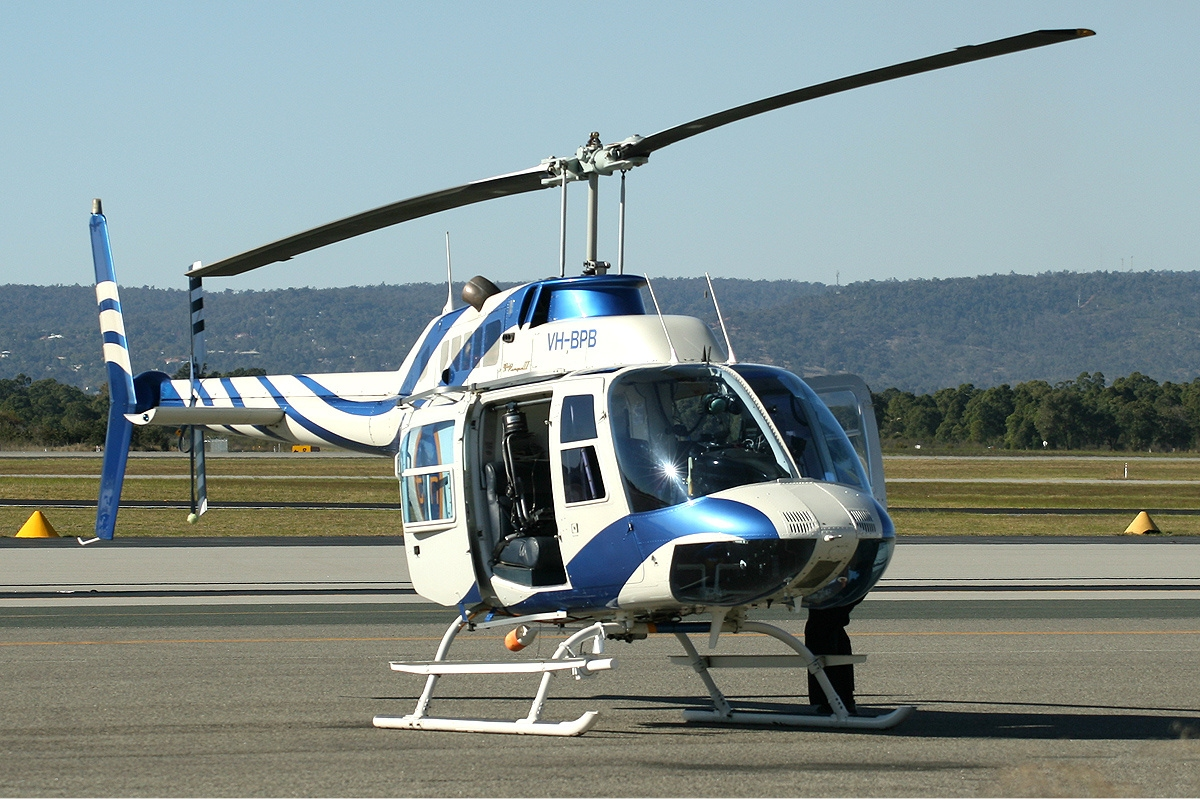
Bell 206 of NEW at Perth Airport (2006).

NEW-10 produces a local news program at 5pm every evening.

10 News Perth is presented from the network's Perth studios by Natalie Forrest on weekdays and Narelda Jacobs at weekends with sports presenter Lachy Reid and weather presenter Beau Pearson. Reporters, camera crews and editorial staff are based at NEW-10's Subiaco studios.

=== Newscasts ===
Ten News Perth initially launched in a nightly 5.30pm timeslot, before moving to its familiar 5pm slot in 1992.

Locally-produced, weekend bulletins were axed in 1996 before studio presentation of the weekday 5pm bulletins was moved from Perth to Sydney in 2000.

Then-anchors Greg Pearce and Christina Morrissy moved to Sydney to present the newscasts, whilst sport and weather presentations were still done from Perth. Morrissy later resigned from these duties after suffering deep vein thrombosis on a flight.

The bulletin was broadcast throughout regional Western Australia on WIN Television from its first day of broadcast through to 26 August 2007 when Nine News's bulletin for Perth replaced Ten News.

Charmaine Dragun was a co-anchor of the 5pm bulletin alongside Tim Webster until her suicide on 2 November 2007.

On 18 January 2008, Network Ten announced that studio production of Ten News would return to Perth. Ten originally moved production of the Perth bulletin to the then-new Pyrmont studios, citing high costs of converting the network's Perth studios.

After auditioning local candidates, reporter Narelda Jacobs was hired as the new solo anchor. For a short period, Jacobs anchored alongside Tim Webster from the Pyrmont studios. Webster stepped down from Ten News Perth and after a short period which saw Ron Wilson and/or Sandra Sully present Perth's bulletin from the Pyrmont studios, Ten News Perth returned to the Dianella studios on 23 June 2008 after an eight-year absence, with Narelda Jacobs as anchor.

A new studio was introduced on 5 December 2016, after the station moved to Subiaco.

In January 2020, Monika Kos replaced Jacobs as presenter. In early January, Jacobs moved to Sydney as a panellist for Studio 10.

In September 2020, studio production of the Perth bulletin was again transferred to Network 10's Sydney headquarters, leading to redundancies among local presentation and production staff. Narelda Jacobs returned to present the Perth bulletin, which continued to air live.

Also in September 2020, Monika Kos departed Channel 10 Perth, before moving to Channel 9 Perth as a news presenter in December 2020.

On 13 March 2023, presentation of the Perth bulletin once again returned to the Subiaco studio, with Natalie Forrest becoming anchor. In December 2023, it was announced that the bulletin would remain permanently locally produced.

In April 2026, Ten reintroduced a locally-presented edition of its 5pm weekend bulletins with Narelda Jacobs returning from Sydney to anchor.

=== Presenters and reporters ===
News presenter

- Natalie Forrest (2023–present, Weeknights)
- Narelda Jacobs (2008–2019, 2020–2022, 2026–present, Weekends)

Sports presenter

- Lachy Reid (2020–present)

Weather presenter

- Beau Pearson (2023–present)

=== Former presenters ===
- Greg Pearce
- Alan Hynd
- Gina Pickering
- Peter Perrin
- Debra Bishop
- Ian Brayshaw
- John Barnett
- Geraldine Mellett
- Peter Ensell
- Kathy Pickup
- Tim Webster
- Ron Wilson
- Christina Morrissy
- Celina Edmonds
- Charmaine Dragun (2005–2007, Deceased)
- Monika Kos (2020)

== See also ==
- Television broadcasting in Australia
