= Matt Doran (journalist) =

Australian journalist

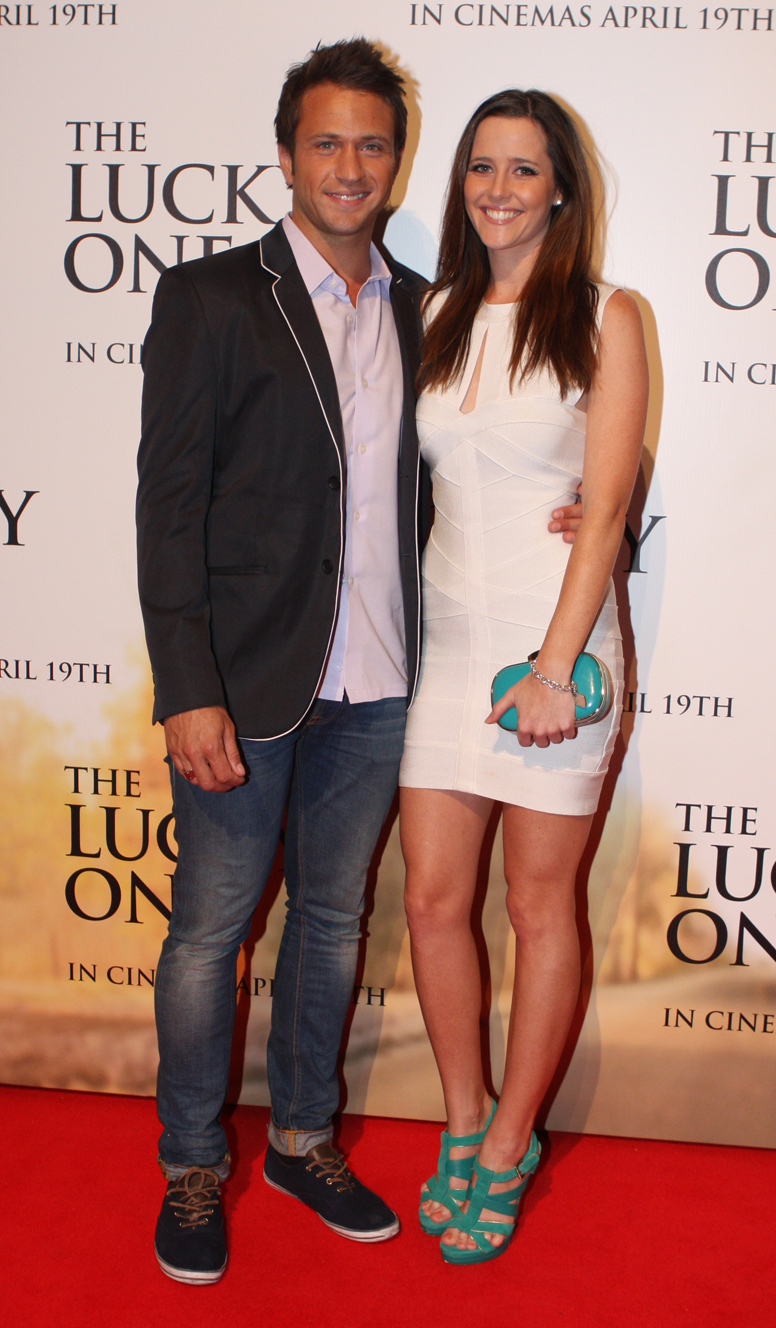
- Born: 22 December 1982 (age 43); Melbourne, Victoria, Australia
- Occupations: Journalist, television reporter
- Spouse: Kendall Bora (m. 2021)

Matt Doran (born 22 December 1982) is an Australian journalist.

Doran has previously been co-host of Weekend Sunrise, a reporter for the Seven Network's flagship public affairs program, Sunday Night and a reporter and presenter at Network Ten.

== Education ==
Doran graduated from Melbourne University in 2003 with a Bachelor of Media and Communications (enriched Journalism major).

== Career ==
Throughout 2006, he worked as a police reporter with Melbourne's Herald Sun newspaper, covering fires, floods, the gangland war and CBD shootings.

=== Network Ten ===
Following this, Doran worked for several years as a general news reporter and then police reporter for Network Ten in Melbourne and Adelaide. Doran played a key role in Network Ten's coverage of a series of natural disasters, including the devastating Christchurch earthquakes, the deadly Pike River mine explosion in New Zealand's West, the Christmas Island boat tragedy and the tsunami which obliterated North-East Japan.

In October 2011, Doran was appointed presenter of Ten News at Five: Weekend with Natarsha Belling, but left the bulletin when it changed to a single-presenter format with only Belling in November 2012.

In November 2013, Doran was appointed presenter of Ten Eyewitness News Early and Ten Eyewitness News Morning. In January 2014, Hermione Kitson replaced Doran on Ten Eyewitness News Early. He continued to present Ten Eyewitness News Morning until the bulletin was cancelled in May 2014 due to cost-cutting measures, and Doran returned to reporting.

In May 2015, Doran resigned from Network Ten after nearly eight years with the network.

=== Seven Network ===
In March 2017, Doran joined the Seven Network as a reporter on its flagship public affairs program, Sunday Night. One of his interviewees was former The Sullivans actress, Susan Hannaford, whose Beverley Hills lifestyle surprised many viewers.

In October 2019, it was announced that Doran will replace Basil Zempilas as co-host of Weekend Sunrise from October 12. He had previously been an intermittent fill-in host on the show, and also regularly fills in for David Koch on Sunrise and Larry Emdur on The Morning Show.

In November 2021, Doran was suspended by the Seven Network for two weeks after failing to adequately prepare for an interview with British singer Adele.

In November 2024, Doran announced his resignation from Weekend Sunrise to focus on family and pursue other opportunities. His last day was on 8 December.

=== Outside Australia ===
In 2015, Doran moved to Los Angeles to host the daily American series Crime Watch Daily in terrestrial syndication during its first season; he departed the series after his replacement with Chris Hansen of To Catch a Predator fame.

== Personal life ==
Doran attended and graduated from St Kevin's College in Toorak, Victoria, completing his Victorian Certificate of Education.

On 31 December 2020, Doran became engaged to Weekend Today executive producer, Kendall Bora. They married in December 2021.
