= Natasha Exelby =

Australian journalist

- Occupation: Journalist

Natasha Exelby is an Australian journalist and former news anchor.

== Career ==
=== Seven Network ===
Following her graduation from the Queensland University of Technology in 2005, Exelby commenced her career as a full-time journalist, working as a reporter for Seven Queensland's local news bulletins in Bundaberg and Townsville.

=== Network 10 ===
Exelby relocated to Canberra in 2008 where she began a three-year stint as a Ten News political reporter, working in the Canberra Press Gallery for Network 10 which included covering the 2010 Australian federal election.

Following her time in Canberra, Exelby became a senior journalist and news presenter in Sydney.

In June 2013, while reading news headlines on Ten Eyewitness News Late, Exelby began giggling while reading a number of serious items. After the incident, Exelby apologised while Network Ten released a statement describing Exelby's actions as "totally unacceptable" and said there was no excusing her behaviour.

Exelby served as one of the original host on Network 10's breakfast news program Wake Up, working alongside Natarsha Belling and James Mathison, which launched on 4 November 2013. However, Exelby was dropped from the program less than three weeks after the first broadcast with creator Adam Boland blaming a lack of chemistry between the three presenters for the decision.

Exelby has since said she was told about her axing in a carpark, 45 minutes before it was publicly announced.

=== TRT World ===
In October 2015, Exelby began working for the Turkish Radio and Television Corporation's international news channel TRT World in Turkey.

=== Freelance Media Consultant ===
Following her work with TRT World, Exelby relocated back to Australia in November 2016, where she then established a media consultancy business.

=== Australian Broadcasting Corporation ===
In 2017, Exelby commenced working as a casual news presenter on the Australian Broadcasting Corporation's news channel ABC News.

While reading a late night ABC News bulletin on Saturday 8 April 2017, Exelby momentarily became distracted by her pen and failed to realise she was on air following the conclusion of a story. Upon realising she was on air, Exelby gasped and hurriedly introduced the sport segment, presented by Meredith Sheehan.

When the blooper was highlighted on Media Watch's social media pages, the clip went viral. Following this, there was numerous stories published reporting Exelby had been punished by the ABC and taken off air because her blooper had gone viral. The belief that Exelby had been fired prompted many messages of support from fellow journalists, television presenters, politicians and entertainers, with the hashtag #putyourbloopersout emerging on social media in support.

However ABC news director Gaven Morris has denied Exelby was fired, describing the many media reports as "untrue" because Exelby was a freelance journalist and as such was not rostered for any additional on air shifts. Morris' statement followed an earlier statement released by an ABC spokesperson which also said Exelby was a "casual contributor" rather than a staff member and was only booked for occasional on air shifts.

Some commentators accused Morris of lying and maintained Exelby had indeed been punished. Exelby also maintains the ABC told her she was unable to go live on air again following the blooper, and had offered her producing shifts instead.

=== I'm a Celebrity... Get Me Out of Here! ===
In 2019, Exelby was a contestant on the fifth season of Network 10's reality show I'm a Celebrity... Get Me Out of Here!, in which she placed 7th out of the 14 celebrities competing.

=== Return to Network 10 ===
In June 2019, it was announced that Exelby would join 10 News First in Melbourne as a presenter and reporter.

In June 2022, Exelby was named as one of the presenters of the network's new national news bulletin, 10 News First: Breakfast, which was introduced as a lead-in to morning program Studio 10. It was announced Lachlan Kennedy would present the Monday to Wednesday editions of the bulletin from the Sydney studio while Exelby would host the Thursday and Friday editions from the Melbourne studio.

In February 2023, Exelby resigned as an employee of Network 10 but continues to fill-in on Studio 10 on a freelance basis.

=== Controversy ===
Exelby was caught driving four times the legal limit after crashing her car in Melbourne on June 26, 2023.

Police officers attended the scene on Orrong Rd at 6.15pm, where they conducted a preliminary breath test. A subsequent test returned a blood alcohol reading of .220. Exelby, 40, told police at the time she drank “two seltzers” that afternoon.
