= Josh Holt =

Australian TV Presenter, Journalist & Meteorologist

- Born: 1980 (age 45–46)
- Education: University of Sydney
- Occupations: Meteorologist and Television Presenter
- Employer: Network 10
- Known for: delivering weather forecasts on television
- Television: 10 News First

Josh Holt (born 1980) is an Australian TV Presenter, Journalist, Meteorologist and Climate Specialist who works at Network 10.

== Biography ==
Josh Holt is the National Network Meteorologist, Climate Specialist and Weather Presenter for Ten News Australia.

After completing his undergraduate degree in Journalism and Media at Sydney University, Holt studied acting and television presenting at NIDA. Holt has also completed his postgraduate university studies in climate and atmospheric sciences graduating with a distinction average. He has also completed his postgraduate studies in meteorology graduating as a student of the Bureau of Meteorology's Graduate Meteorologist Program.

He spent five years at the original The Weather Channel before joining Network 10 in July 2013 as the weather presenter for the Brisbane edition of Ten News at Five.

When Network 10 underwent a major restructure in 2020 which saw the production of each of the state news bulletins centralised to Sydney and Melbourne, it was initially reported that Holt had been made redundant along with his on air colleague, news presenter Georgina Lewis, with the network opting to use one national weather presenter for all bulletins.

However, it was later revealed the network would instead transfer Holt from Brisbane to Sydney where he would present the local weather forecasts on the Brisbane, Sydney and Perth editions of 10 News First while Kate Freebairn would deliver local weather forecasts for the Melbourne and Adelaide editions of 10 News First.

On the Sydney edition of 10 News First, Holt succeeded veteran weather presenter Tim Bailey who had been with the network for 30 years. On the Perth edition of 10 News First, Holt succeeded local Perth weather presenter Michael Schultz, though he was since replaced by Beau Pearson when local production resumed in March 2023. In September 2024, Holt ceased appearing on the Queensland bulletin, following the return of local production to Mount Coot-tha in Brisbane; he continues to present weather on the now-standalone Sydney bulletin and 10 News Lunchtime and Late Night national bulletins.

While at The Weather Channel, Holt was nominated for Most Outstanding Performance by a Broadcast Journalist at the 2010 and 2012 ASTRA Awards but lost to Kieran Gilbert and David Speers, respectively, both from Sky News Australia. However, Holt was part of The Weather Channel team who won the ASTRA Award for Most Outstanding News or Coverage in 2010, for his on air live rolling coverage during the Black Saturday bushfires.
