= Good Morning Australia =

Good Morning Australia may refer to:

- Good Morning Australia (1981 TV program), a 1981–1992 Australian breakfast television news and infotainment program that aired on Network Ten
- Good Morning Australia (1992 TV program), originally titled The Morning Show, a 1992–2005 Australian morning television variety program hosted by Bert Newton that aired on Network Ten
