= The Truth Is... =

The Truth Is... may refer to:

- The Truth Is... (Failsafe album), 2008
- The Truth Is... (Theory of a Deadman album), 2011
- The Truth Is (Alexandra Burke album), 2018
- The Truth Is (TV program), an Australian current affairs television program

== See also ==
- Truth Is (disambiguation)
