= Candice Wyatt =

Australian journalist and news presenter (born 1982)

- Born: 8 October 1982 (age 44); Melbourne, Victoria, Australia
- Occupations: Journalist, news presenter
- Years active: 2003-present
- Employer: News24

Candice Wyatt (born 8 October 1982) is an Australian journalist and news presenter.

Wyatt is currently a presenter on News24.

Her most recognised role was as a presenter and reporter at Network 10, a tenure that spanned fifteen years from 29 November 2010 to 5 December 2025.

== Career ==
After graduating from VCE in the rural Victorian town of Terang, Candice Wyatt completed a Bachelor of Arts Journalism at Deakin University in Geelong. From 2003 to 2005 Candice ran Melbourne's Werribee Times newspaper. In 2006 she moved interstate and began her broadcast journalism career at TNT, a Seven Network affiliated TV station in Tasmania. While in Tasmania she reported on the Beaconsfield Mine Disaster which made international news headlines. In 2008 she moved to ABC Ballarat where she later became the Senior Journalist for the ABC rural bureau in Ballarat.

In 2010, Wyatt joined the Ten Network at its Melbourne station ATV10. For two years she was the station's crime reporter for Ten News Melbourne. In this role she reported on Jill Meagher's murder. She also chased drug mules to Malaysia and Indonesia and covered the disappearance of flight MH370. She was the first reporter to go live into Australia from Bali as Schapelle Corby was being released from prison. She has covered the 2016 Rio Olympic Games, the search for a crashed passenger jet in the Java Sea, and numerous stories in Israel. Wyatt also appeared on the Network's current affairs show The Project as a reporter and fill in co-host.

In November 2014, Candice became the permanent co-anchor for Melbourne's Ten Eyewitness News with Stephen Quartermain. Wyatt co-anchored the bulletin until February 2017, when she returned to field reporting, She remained a popular fill-in presenter for the bulletin.

When the network launched its long-format news program “Ten News +” in 2025, Wyatt was seconded to deliver a series of national exclusives.

She is a in-demand MC, often hosting events for the Essendon Football Club as well as a number of charities and organisations such as Cure Brain Cancer Australia and the Melbourne Press Club.

In November 2025, Wyatt announced her resignation from Network 10 after 15 years with the network, saying it was time for “a new chapter.”

In May 2026, Wyatt started working as a news presenter for News24.

== Personal life ==
Wyatt was an Ambassador for Cure Brain Cancer Australia after losing her 56-year-old mother to the disease in 2013. In 2020 she trekked the Himalayas in Nepal with the charity, in honour of her mother. In the process she raised more than $40kAUD for research. She enjoys spending her free time socialising and has a passion for food and restaurant reviewing. She is also an Essendon Football Club supporter.

She is the former girlfriend of Australian cricketer Glenn Maxwell.

She divides her time between Melbourne and Barwon Heads on the Bellarine Peninsula, where her current partner lives.
