= Truth Is =

Truth Is may refer to:

- Truth Is (album), an album by Sabrina Claudio, or the title track, 2019
- "Truth Is" (Fantasia song), from Free Yourself, 2004
- "Truth Is", a song by Maisie Peters from The Good Witch (Deluxe), 2023

== See also ==
- The Truth Is... (disambiguation)
