= Revealed (Australian TV program) =

- Revealed Logo
- Genre: News and Current Affairs
- Presented by: Hugh Riminton
- Country of origin: Australia
- Original language: English
- No. of seasons: 1
- No. of episodes: 10

Production
- Production locations: Sydney, New South Wales
- Running time: 60 minutes

Original release
- Network: Network Ten
- Release: 12 September – 14 November 2013

Revealed is an Australian news and current affairs television series. It first aired on Network Ten on 12 September 2013, hosted by Hugh Riminton.

Revealed features interviews, profiles and investigative reports on a wide variety of topical issues. It combines locally produced stories with stories from America's CBS News.

== See also ==
- Ten Eyewitness News
- List of Australian television series
