= James Mathison =

Australian television presenter

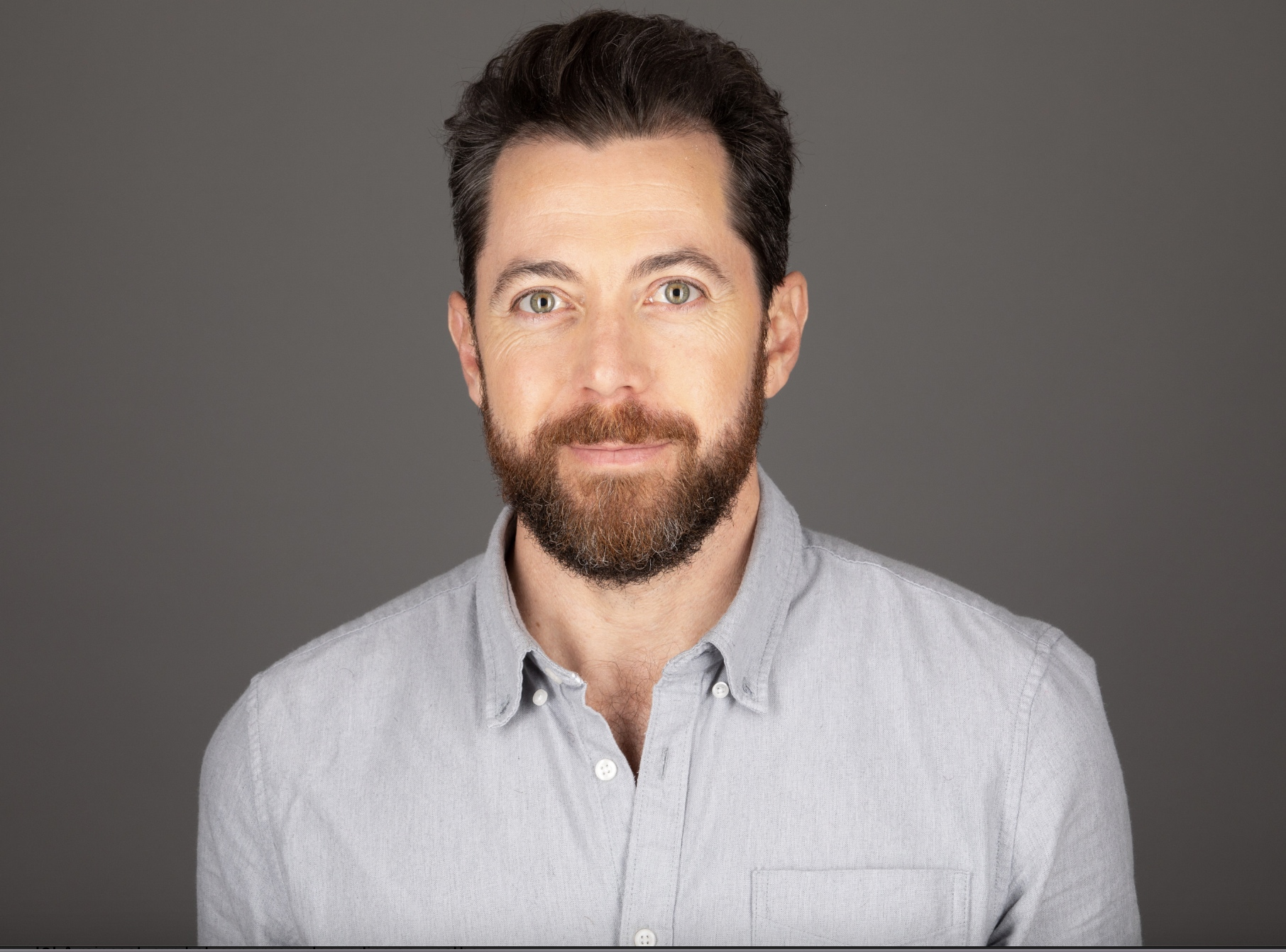
- Portrait of Mathison
- Born: James Hernandez Mathison; 14 January 1978 (age 48); Sydney, New South Wales, Australia
- Occupation: Television presenter
- Years active: 2000–present

James Hernandez Mathison (born 14 January 1978) is an Australian television presenter and radio personality.

== Early life ==
Mathison was born in Sydney, New South Wales. He developed an interest in music at an early age, which eventually led to his career in broadcasting. Mathison first gained national recognition as a co-host on Australian Idol, where his engaging, and conversational style made him a fan favourite. His success in television later led to opportunities in radio, digital media, and politics.

== Career ==
=== Entertainment ===
==== Television ====
In 2001, Mathison was a contestant on the Channel Ten reality TV show The $20 Challenge, during which he was shown busking on the streets of London for extra money. He achieved second place in the contest. Weeks after returning from London, he auditioned for one of Australia's prominent TV music shows, Channel Channel [V]'s New Reporter Search. After making it through to the final 8, he was offered a job there as host and video journalist.

In 2003, Mathison was appointed co-host of Australian Idol alongside Channel [V] host Andrew Günsberg. They created a behind-the-scenes show for Channel [V] called Australian Idol Extra for the second, and third seasons of the programme.

Mathison appeared on a celebrity episode of the Australian version of Ready Steady Cook in October 2005, in which he was declared the winner, beating Osher Günsberg (aka. Andrew G).

Mathison has also been a presenter on Nova 96.9 where he hosted "LaunchPad", a late night new music show, as well as co-hosting summer breakfast programming.

In 2005 and 2006, James hosted the ARIA Music Awards. In 2007, James, along with Hamish and Andy, hosted the ARIA Red Carpet segment. He also made a brief cameo appearance on the Australian feature film BoyTown in the ARIA's scene playing himself alongside Ella Hooper. In June 2009, Network Ten announced that James would be a reporter, and panelist on The 7pm Project covering media and sport alongside, Charlie Pickering, Carrie Bickmore and Dave Hughes. In July 2012, Mathison joined Weekend Sunrise where he replaced Jonathan Coleman as a movie reviewer.

In July 2013, Network Ten announced Mathison would be presenter of its new breakfast program Wake Up alongside Natarsha Belling, Natasha Exelby and Nuala Hafner.

==== Music and Entertainment ====
Mathison is widely recognised for his interviews with some of the biggest names in pop music and film. He has also played a role in supporting emerging Australian music talent. As a co-host on Channel V and Australian Idol, James has become known for his on-screen presence, showcasing a deep knowledge of music and his ability to connect with contestants and viewers.

Mathison also works in radio and digital media, interviewing figures and covering events within the entertainment industry. His interviews focus on the people and trends shaping popular culture.

Mathison is an influential and iconic entertainment journalists in Australia. His contributions to Australian media have made him admired for his impact on the broader entertainment community.

=== Politics ===
On 28 May 2016, Mathison announced that he would contest the 2016 federal election as an independent candidate for the federal seat of Warringah. The seat was held by Tony Abbott, a member of the Liberal Party and a former Prime Minister. Mathison received 11.4% of the primary vote. He assisted in grassroots training and campaign events supporting Zali Steggall in her successful bid to win the federal seat of Warringah as an independent in 2019.
