= Monika Kos =

Australian journalist and television presenter

- Born: 2 December 1967 (age 58); Perth, Western Australia
- Occupations: Television presenter & journalist
- Years active: 1989–present
- Employer: Nine Network
- Television: Nine News (2020–present); 10 News First (2019–2020); Today Tonight (1997–2019)
- Spouse: Grant Willesee
- Children: Denham Willesee
- Parents: Friedrich Anton Kos (father); Jane Margaret née Roper (mother)

Monika Kos (born 2 December 1967, Perth, Western Australia) is an Australian journalist and television presenter.

== Career ==
Kos is best known for presenting the Western Australian edition of the Seven Network's evening current affairs program Today Tonight from 1997 until it was axed in 2019.

Kos studied at Loreto Nedlands and John XXIII College and is a graduate of the Western Australian Academy of Performing Arts. She worked at Perth radio station 6PR in the late 1980s in various roles including as a presenter before she joined Channel 7 in Perth as a cadet journalist in 1990.

In December 2019, it was announced Kos had joined Network 10 and would replace Narelda Jacobs as presenter on the Perth edition of 10 News First.

In August 2020, Kos was made redundant by Network 10. She presented her final Perth-based 10 News First bulletin on 11 September, after which production of the state-based Perth bulletin moved to Sydney.

On 2 December 2020, it was announced that Kos would be joining Nine News Perth to front a new live and local one-hour bulletin at 5pm, commencing Monday, 7 December.

== Personal life ==
Kos is the daughter of Friedrich Anton Kos (an architect and architectural photographer) and Jane Margaret née Roper (a graphic artist and painter). Kos has an older half-brother, David, a farmer in Tasmania.

Kos is of Austrian descent, her father was born in Vienna in 1926 and migrated to Australia in 1951 following World War II.

Kos is married to Grant Willesee, a camera operator and son of Terry Willesee.
