= Sue Kellaway =

Australian television personality (born c. 1940)

- Born: c. 1940 (age 85–86); Christchurch, New Zealand
- Education: University of Canterbury
- Occupations: Television presenter, journalist
- Spouse: Charles Bidwill

Sue Kellaway (born c. 1940) is a New Zealand-Australian former television journalist and presenter.

Kellaway worked in her native country, before coming to Australia, where she was the original hostess of breakfast news program, Good Morning Australia, a format based on the American concept of Good Morning America opposite Gordon Elliott, and subsequently on the Nine Network program Today, opposite Steve Liebmann.

== Biography ==
=== Early career ===
Kellaway was born in Christchurch, New Zealand and educated at St Margaret's College, Christchurch before attending the University of Canterbury, she trained as a nurse, before switching to modelling and singing. She then won Miss Universe New Zealand pageant, before entering public relations and advertising.

=== Career in New Zealand ===
Kellaway started her career in journalism in her native New Zealand on television as a reporter and presenter for South Pacific Television

=== Career in Australia ===
Kellaway visited Australia in 1980 on a vacation and realized there were not many women working as news anchors at the time. She was selected to host Good Morning Australia, a new breakfast TV news program which was being launched on Rupert Murdoch's Network Ten, and would follow a similar concept to the American morning show Good Morning America'

In 1982, she moved to co-host the Nine Network's Today program, another breakfast show, when it launched and she continued to co-host opposite Steve Liebmann until 1985.

She lives in the United Kingdom with her husband, New Zealand business executive Charles Bidwill, and has homes in Mexico and Portugal
