= Lachlan Kennedy =

Australian journalist

- Education: Australian National University
- Occupations: television journalist and presenter
- Years active: 2007–present
- Television: Southern Cross Ten News; WIN News; Ten Eyewitness News Queensland; 10 News First: Breakfast

Lachlan Kennedy is an Australian journalist and news presenter.

== Career ==
After graduating from the Australian National University in 2007, he joined Southern Cross Ten in Canberra where he presented Southern Cross News updates for southern parts of New South Wales and Central Australia.

In 2008, Kennedy moved over to WIN Television in Canberra where he worked on the local WIN News bulletin as the lead political reporter, sports presenter and chief of staff. Kennedy left WIN Television in 2010.

Following his departure from WIN, Kennedy joined Network 10 as a reporter in 2010. He was appointed the network's United States bureau correspondent in 2013.

In 2015, it was announced Kennedy would co-present Ten Eyewitness News Queensland alongside Georgina Lewis at 10's Brisbane station, commencing on 7 September 2015. Kennedy continued in that role until a restructure at the network in early 2017 saw all of the network's state bulletins adopt a single-presenter format, relegating him back to reporting duties.

In June 2022, Kennedy was named as one of the presenters of the network's new national news bulletin, 10 News First: Breakfast, which was introduced as a lead-in to morning program Studio 10. It was announced Kennedy would present the Monday to Wednesday editions of the bulletin from the Sydney studio while Natasha Exelby would host the Thursday and Friday editions from the Melbourne studio.
