= Ron Wilson (newsreader) =

Australian television/radio presenter

- Born: Ronald Wilson; 25 October 1954 (age 72); Enniskillen, County Fermanagh, Northern Ireland
- Occupations: TV and radio news presenter
- Years active: 1974–present
- Employer: AIR National News (2026–present)
- Known for: Ten News (1979–2012) smoothfm (2013–2024)

Ronald Wilson (born 25 October 1954) is a Northern Irish-born Australian television and radio news presenter and voice-over with a lengthy career in journalism and hosting, especially with Network 10.

Wilson was a news presenter on FM radio network smoothfm, a division of Nova Entertainment and previously worked at Network 10 in Sydney for over 33 years.

== Personal life ==
Wilson was born in Enniskillen, County Fermanagh, Northern Ireland and emigrated to Australia with his family when he was a young child. He spent much of his childhood in Victoria and completed a law degree in Darwin, Northern Territory. When Cyclone Tracy destroyed Darwin in 1974, Wilson was on scene as host of a local radio program. Wilson admitted on the "Newsreaders Vs TV Hosts" episode of All Star Family Feud on 21 November 2016 that he still suffers from posttraumatic stress disorder from surviving Cyclone Tracy. He received Australian citizenship on 31 March 2008.

Wilson is married with three children. He supports the Sydney Swans AFL club.

== Career ==
=== Television ===
==== Network 10 ====
Wilson worked as a newsreader on Good Morning Australia from 1982 to 1991 alongside Kerri-Anne Kennerley and Gordon Elliott among others. During that time, he also presented for Ten on Sydney's weekend newscasts (variously called Ten Eyewitness News, Ten News, Eyewitness News and Ten Evening News). Wilson took the helm of Good Morning Australia alongside Sandra Sully in 1992. The pair moved from dawn to dusk a year later, presenting Ten's 5.00 pm newscast. From 1981 to 1982, Wilson had presented the evening 6.00 pm news with Katrina Lee. In 1994, Wilson was joined at the Sydney newsdesk by Juanita Phillips and, two years later, by Jessica Rowe in a partnership lasting 10 years. He also presented NEW-10 Perth's 5.00 pm news (broadcast from TEN-10's studios) from 2003 to 2005.

Wilson has reported and presented from the scene of some of Sydney's biggest news events. He covered the Ansett Australia Boeing 747 crash at Sydney Airport in 1994 – the only Sydney news presenter to broadcast from the airport that night – and broadcast from several of Sydney's major bushfires of the 1990s and early 2000s.

Wilson presented non-stop coverage of the start of Gulf War 1 on 17 January 1991 (AEDT) on Ten from mid-morning until 6.00 pm. He also presented live coverage of the first US strikes against Baghdad marking the commencement of the War in Iraq in 2003.

Wilson has joked that "everyone has had a read with Ron". His co-presenters have included Anne Fulwood, Sandra Sully, Katrina Lee, Juanita Phillips, Deborah Knight, Jessica Rowe, Natarsha Belling, Tracey Spicer, Charmaine Dragun, Celina Edmonds, Claudia Emery, Margaret Bates, Geraldine Doogue and Ann Sanders.

Wilson was replaced on Sydney's Ten News at Five bulletin by Bill Woods in January 2009.

Wilson was previously the presenter of Ten Early News and also Ten Morning News on Mondays and Tuesdays. He also previously presented Ten News at Five in Sydney alongside Deborah Knight until 16 January 2009.

In May 2012, Wilson was appointed news presenter on Breakfast, a role he retained until August 2012. He also presented Ten News updates on The Circle until the program was cancelled in August 2012. In August 2012 it was announced Wilson would return as presenter of Ten Morning News.

Despite reportedly being sacked by Network Ten in November 2012, Wilson continued with the station as a fill-in presenter for its national weekend news bulletins. He filled in for Sandra Sully and Natarsha Belling until 28 December that year, which was his final time presenting for Ten News.

==== Seven Network ====
In October 2013, Wilson began making regular appearances on the Seven Network's breakfast show Sunrise.

=== Radio ===
In the period between 1975 and 1979, Wilson worked for a number of radio stations, including 2WL Wollongong, 2SM and 2UE. He also worked at Sydney radio station Mix 106.5 for several years in the early 2000s as newsreader on the breakfast show. He resigned from Mix 106.5 in 2006.

Wilson replaced the outgoing Rowan Barker as Macquarie National News newsreader on 30 June 2008. Wilson was subsequently heard on 7 July 2008 as he did the Macquarie National News bulletins for 2GB during the Alan Jones Breakfast Show as well as Bob Rogers's show at sister station 2CH on 9 July 2008.

In April 2013, Wilson joined smoothfm as a newsreader and hosted the music breakfast show every weekday as an announcer with his radio presenting colleague Bogart Torelli from 5:30 AM to 9 AM until his departure from the network in December 2024. He took over full time in the breakfast presenting role succeeding the late Glenn Daniel who died in December 2021.

Wilson hosted breakfast for six months on 2SM in 2025.

=== Movie ===
He had a small part as an extra in the first scene of the movie The Odd Angry Shot.
