= Natarsha Belling =

Australian journalist (born 1970)

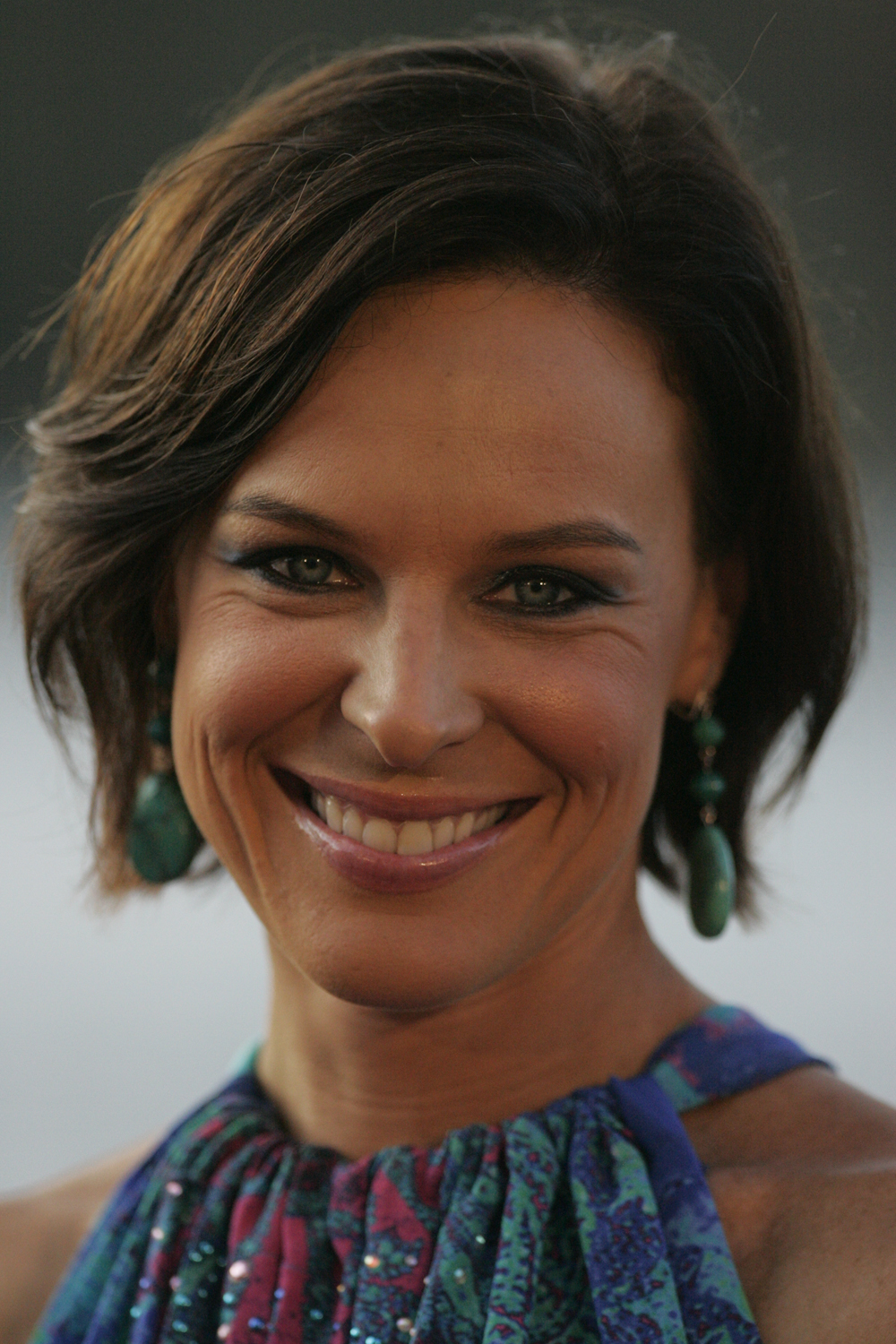
- Belling in 2013
- Born: 29 May 1970 (age 56); Mudgee, New South Wales, Australia
- Other names: Tarsh, Nat
- Education: Charles Sturt University
- Occupation: Journalist
- Years active: 1995−present
- Employer: Seven Network
- Spouse: Glen Sealey
- Children: 2
- Website: natarshabelling.com

Natarsha Belling (born 29 May 1970) is an Australian journalist, television and radio presenter.

Belling currently presents Seven's National News at Noon.

Belling has previously worked at Network 10 as a television presenter, news presenter and reporter. She spent over two decades with the company until being made redundant in August 2020.

== Early life and education ==
Belling was born and raised in Mudgee in the Orana region of New South Wales. She often visits the town with her family and has philanthropic connections with the region.

She was a boarder at St Vincent's College, Potts Point in Sydney.

Belling attended Charles Sturt University in Bathurst, New South Wales and graduated with a Bachelor of Arts (Communications) degree.

== Career ==
Prior to joining Network 10, Belling was a reporter with Prime Television in Orange, New South Wales, and was a presenter with the Australian Broadcasting Corporation in Darwin. She then joined 10, originally as a medical reporter.

=== Network 10 ===
In 2007, Belling became the national presenter of 10 Morning News, replacing Tracey Spicer. She read the news on Wednesdays to Fridays (with Ron Wilson presenting on Mondays and Tuesdays). From May 2009 through to 2012, Belling presented the bulletin from Monday to Wednesday. Belling was also a fill-in co-host for Kim Watkins on Ten's former morning show 9am with David and Kim.

Also in May 2009, Belling replaced Bill Woods on 10 Weekend News, upon returning from maternity leave.

In 2010, Belling presented brief news updates on The Circle, headlining the latest news on Wednesdays, Thursdays and Fridays.

In October 2011, Matt Doran joined Belling on a revamped version of 10 News Weekend, along with former Sports Tonight weekend presenter Rob Canning and meteorologist Magdalena Roze.

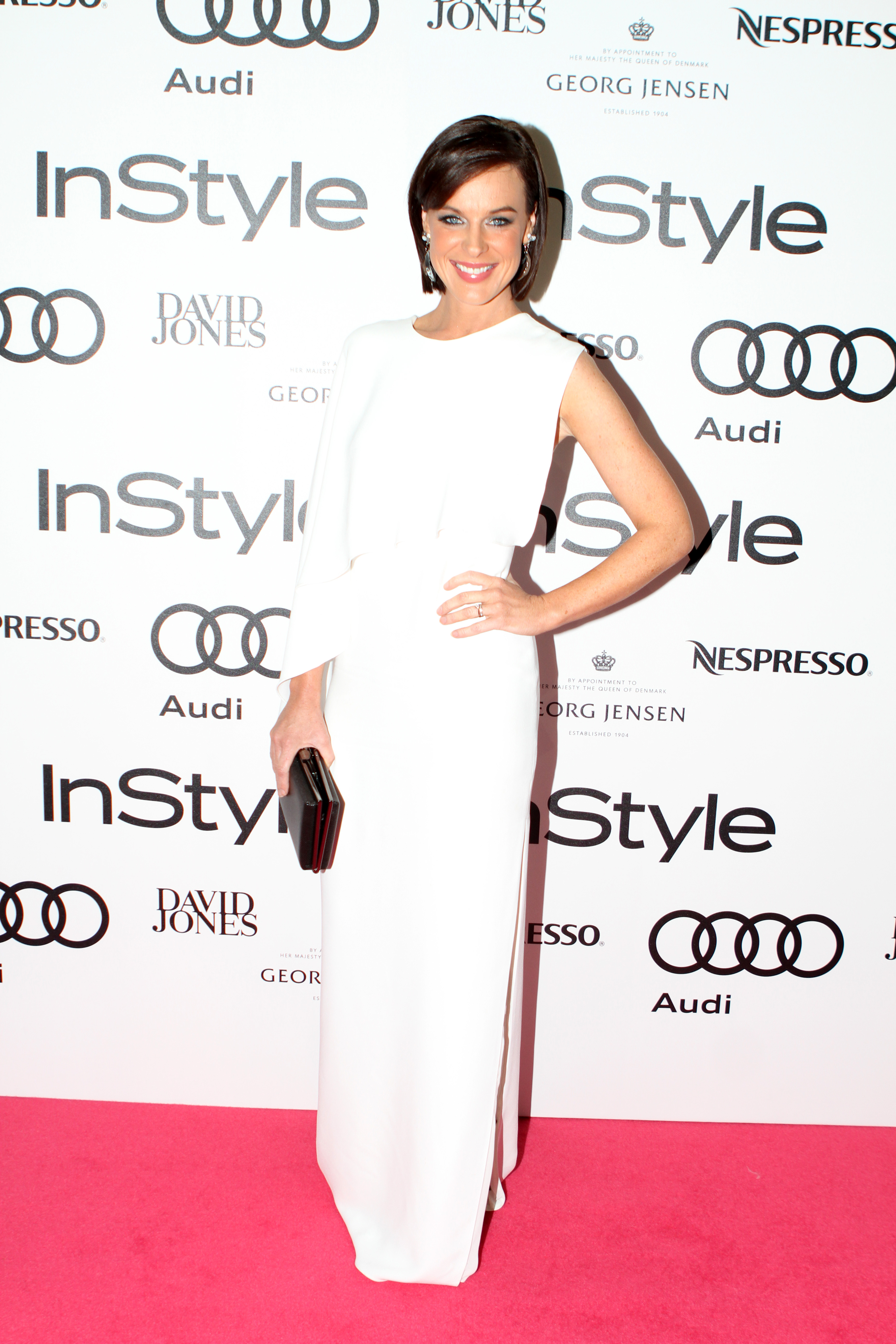
Belling in 2015

In July 2012, Belling was appointed Thursday and Friday news presenter on Breakfast which, due to poor ratings, was canceled in December 2012.

In late 2012, 10 Weekend News was returned to a solo presented bulletin with Belling in the role. Canning also resigned from the network after 12 years and Roze also eventually resigned.

In mid-2013, Hermione Kitson replaced Belling on 10 Weekend News, as Belling was promoted to co-present the new Wake Up breakfast program.

In July 2013, Belling was appointed co-host of Network 10's new breakfast show Wake Up with Natasha Exelby and James Mathison. The program lost about 50% of its audience share by November 2013, rated lower than Breakfast, the show Ten had cancelled the year before because of low ratings.

In mid-2014, Wake Up was axed and Belling took leave and wasn't given a permanent position again for some time, filling-in and having various guest roles. Belling returned to 10 Weekend News in 2015. Her final 10 Weekend News bulletin was on 16 December 2018.

Belling was a regular fill in for Sarah Harris on Studio 10 and Carrie Bickmore on The Project. She also had a short stint hosting The Sunday Project until she was replaced by Chris Bath.

Belling's major Studio 10 fill-in stints were when host Sarah Harris took leave to marry her fiancé, host a local edition of Shark Tank Australia and when she was on maternity leave giving birth to her sons in 2015 and 2017.

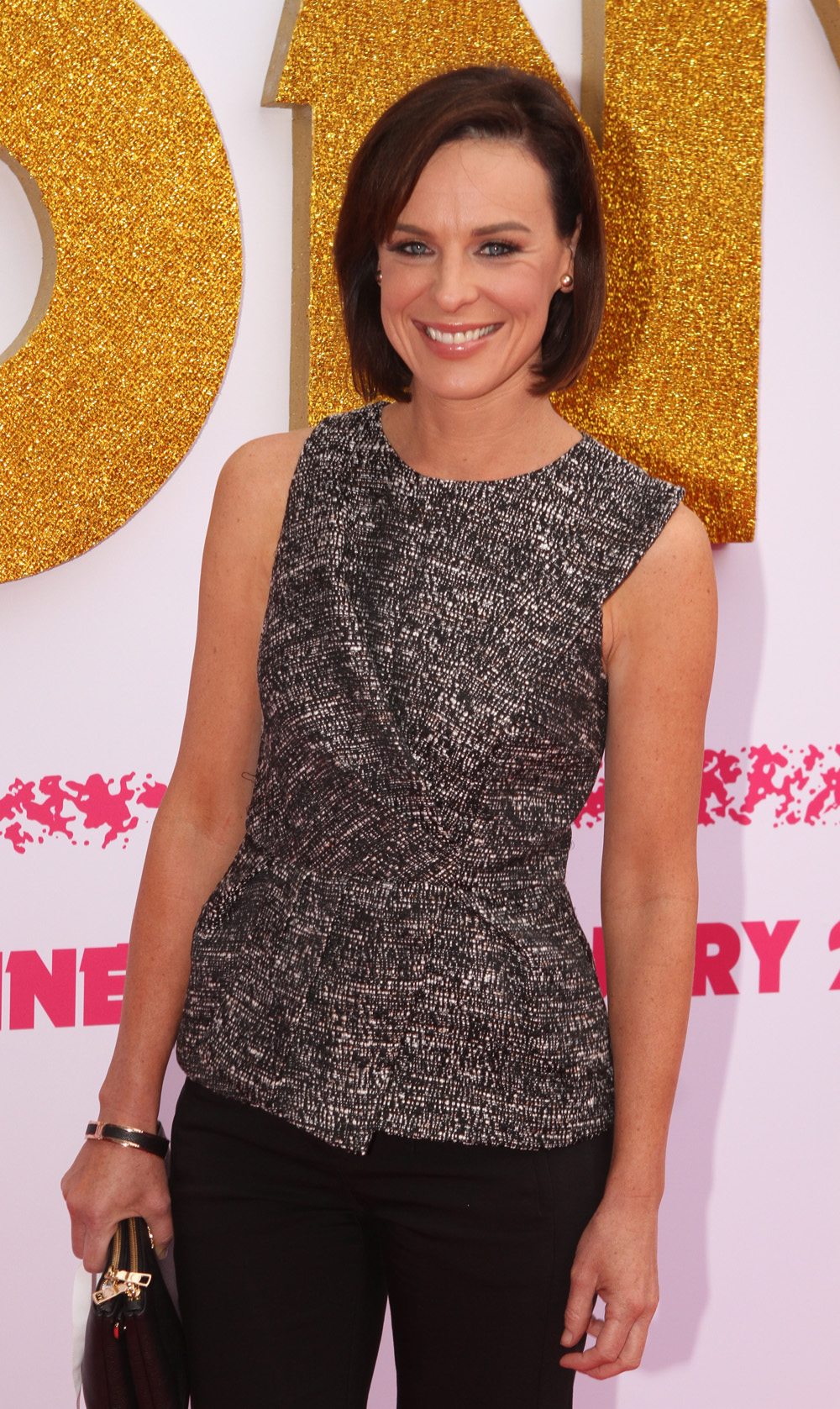
Belling at the premiere of I, Tonya in 2018

In December 2018, it was announced that Belling would join Studio 10 as a news presenter. She has been working in this role from the beginning of 2019 and when Sarah Harris is not in attendance, Belling hosts the show for the day. Other panel members include Joe Hildebrand, Kerri-Anne Kennerly, Angela Bishop, and Denise Drysdale.

In August 2020, Belling was made redundant by Network 10, bringing to an end a career of over two decades with the network. Along with her, other Ten News presenters including Tim Bailey, Rebecca Morse and Kerri-Anne Kennerley were also made redundant.

=== Southern Cross Austereo ===
On 17 November 2020, Belling announced that she would be fronting a new podcast, Your Morning Agenda. The podcast falls under Southern Cross Austereo's news podcast product suite and it aims to deliver the most up to date news and current affairs for listeners. This daily news podcast covers the top breaking news stories every morning covering national and international, news and sport with a focus on business and finance from 6:30am.

As a passionate advocate for rural Australia, Belling announced her new role as the co-host and newsreader on Australia Today, through the LISTNR app with Steve Price. The broadcast began on 6 April 2021, with episodes streaming on weekdays between 7am to 10am.

In November 2022, it was announced that Belling would join Mick Molloy and Mark Geyer as a newsreader on newsreader on Molloy and MG in the Morning on Triple M Sydney.

In November 2024, it was revealed that Belling will be part of Triple M Breakfast with Beau, Tarsh & Woodsy, joining Beau Ryan and Aaron Woods on Triple M Sydney.

In March 2025, Belling announced that she would be leaving Triple M Breakfast to take on the host role of LiSTNR podcast The Briefing, Afternoon Edition.

=== Seven Network ===
Four months after being made redundant by Network 10, Belling joined the Seven Network as a panelist and appears weekly on The Morning Show as a panelist to discuss current topics of interest, in the 'What's The Buzz' segment.

In January 2025, Belling was appointed as presenter of Seven's National News at Noon.

In June 2026, Belling was made redundant as part of a major restructure following the merger of Southern Cross Austereo and Seven West Media, which resulted in significant job cuts across the organisation.

Natarsha has also filled in on The Morning Show, Seven's Early News, Sunrise and Weekend Sunrise.

== Personal life ==
Belling is married to Glen Sealey who is currently working as the general manager for Renault Australia. They have two sons, Harry (b. 2007) and Hugo (b. 2009)
