= Tim Webster =

Australian television and radio personality and sports broadcaster

- Born: 15 December 1951 (age 74); Australia
- Occupations: Television and radio presenter, sports broadcaster
- Years active: 1972–present
- Notable work: Sports Tonight (1993–2004)

Tim Webster (born 15 December 1951) is an Australian television and radio personality and sports broadcaster. He held various presenting roles on Network 10 from 1981 until 2008.

Webster currently hosts The Tim Webster Breakfast Show on 2SM.

== Career ==
=== Early career ===
In 1972, Webster started working for Bathurst radio station 2BS, progressing from a media buyer to a radio announcer. Later, Webster was part of the on-air team at Triple M Sydney.

=== Television ===
Webster was the first newsreader on breakfast television show Good Morning Australia. In the early 1980s, he presented Eyewitness News in Sydney alongside Katrina Lee. The pair enjoyed considerable success, often No. 1 in their timeslot.

On 20 January 1992, Webster launched Australia's first regular weeknight 5:00 pm newscast, reuniting with Katrina Lee to co-present Sydney's Ten Eyewitness News First at Five.

Webster covered various major sporting events for Network 10, including the Melbourne Cup, Olympic Games, Commonwealth Games and Australasian golf tour. From 1993 to 2004, he was the host of the nightly sports program Sports Tonight.

During the 2003 Logie Awards, Webster was bitten on a thigh by a snake that Steve Irwin was handling during a performance.

In 2005, Webster became the co-presenter of Perth's Ten News at Five, alongside Charmaine Dragun, while continuing as the sports presenter on the Sydney bulletin. Following Dragun's death in late 2007, Webster continued as the solo anchor of the Perth bulletin until 5 May 2008, after which he was replaced by Narelda Jacobs ahead of the bulletin's relocation back to Perth. Later that same month, he stepped down as the Sydney bulletin's sports presenter on 30 May 2008, retiring from Network 10 after 27 years.

In early 2011, Webster presented sport alongside Sandra Sully on Sydney's short-lived Ten Evening News. After that bulletin was axed, and replaced by 6.30 with George Negus (which moved from its original 6:00 pm timeslot) on 4 April 2011, Webster acted as a fill-in presenter for Ten News at Five and other national bulletins.

=== Radio ===
In June 2008, Webster joined radio station 2UE as fill-in newsreader and sports presenter. He replaced Steve Price who moved to John Laws' former timeslot.

Webster hosted an afternoon program on Sydney's 2UE, 1.00 pm to 4.00 pm Monday to Friday, before joining Macquarie Sports Radio in 2018 as a weekend host.

In February 2019, Webster took over mornings on Sydney's 2CH from Bob Rogers. In January 2020, he moved to breakfast. In 2023 Webster joined ABC Radio Sydney as a presenter on the national overnight program. In June 2025, Webster took over the 2SM breakfast show from his former fellow Ten News colleague Ron Wilson.

== Personal life ==
Webster went to school at Scots College in Sydney.

Webster has two sons and a daughter.

Webster was diagnosed with Barrett's esophagus in 2005. He developed oesophageal cancer as a result of the condition and underwent surgery to remove a tumour in his oesophagus.
