= Sports Tonight (Australian TV program) =

Former Australian TV series

- Presented by: Max Burford; Adrian Franklin
- Country of origin: Australia
- Original language: English
- No. of seasons: 19

Production
- Running time: 45 minutes (2018–2020); 30 minutes (including commercials) (1993–2011); 15–20 minutes during Ten Late News (2008–2011)
- Production company: CBS Studios International (2018–2020)

Original release
- Network: Network 10
- Release: 30 August 1993 – 30 September 2011
- Release: 15 July 2018 – 27 November 2019
- Release: 25 May 2026

Sports Tonight is an Australian sports news and information program that is broadcast on Network 10 and has been hosted by several presenters. The original series, which was produced by Network Ten Holdings (later a division of CBS Studios International and developed by executive producer Steve Tucker, aired between 1993 and 2011, before it was briefly revived between 2018–20, and again in 2026.

== History ==
=== Original run ===
The show ran from 1993 to 2011. From 1993 until 2005, the show ran for half an hour on each weeknight after Ten Late News. The two shows merged in 2006, but there was some criticism by viewers that Sports Tonight was not long enough, and that it should have remained the same. The Friday edition, however, remained as a stand-alone program in order to recap that night's football results.

In 2011 the weekend 5:30 pm editions of Sports Tonight normally seen on Network 10 were removed from those timeslots, due to the weekend news bulletins moving to 6 pm. To compensate for this, a Sports Tonight-branded sports report was incorporated into these bulletins. This edition of Sports Tonight had been airing in the 5:30 pm weekend slot since 1999.

Towards the end of its original run, the program was branded as Toyota Sports Tonight. In late 2006, the show was sponsored by Toyota and its upcoming Toyota Aurion, although only minor modifications were done to the on-air graphics to match those of the Aurion colours. In early 2007, the graphics were updated with a heavily sponsored on-air look.

Since March 2009, a weeknightly 9:30 pm edition (started out at 7 pm) of Sports Tonight aired on One with a weekend wrap edition on Sundays. Since 8 May 2011 with the relaunch of One, it aired at around 10:30 pm weeknights (which varies if other programming is on) and at 11:00 pm on Fridays.

In December 2010 Sports Tonight updated their on-air graphics. On 5 July 2011, it was announced that the show would be axed; the show continued to air until just before the conclusion of the football seasons. The final episode aired on 30 September 2011.

=== 2018 revival ===
On 4 July 2018, Network Ten announced that the show would return after a seven-year absence, with Matt White to host alongside panelists Josh Gibson and Laurie Daley. It originally aired weekly on Sunday nights at 9:15 pm from 15 July 2018; however, following the end of the AFL and NRL seasons, the show shifted to a Monday night timeslot. As CBS Studios International had acquired Ten Network Holdings in 2017, the logo and on-air graphics were again updated to a package based around the standardised graphics package and title sequences from CBS Sports that debuted in February 2016 as part of Super Bowl 50.

In March 2019, Network Ten announced that the show would return for 2019 and would be hosted by Roz Kelly alongside panelists Scott Mackinnon and Ant Sharwood. The show aired on Wednesday nights. The final episode was aired on 27 November 2019.

=== 2026 revival ===
On 14 May 2026, it was announced that the show would once again be revived, this time as a segment within Network 10's late-night news bulletin. The segment began airing on 25 May.

== Hosts and panelists ==
- Max Burford (2026)
- Adrian Franklin (2026)

=== Former hosts ===
- Roz Kelly (2019)
- Tim Webster (first host, 1993–2004) – now on ABC Radio Sydney
- Bill Woods (alternative host, 1993–2005) – now on Fox Sports Australia
- Leigh Diffey (weekend host during 2005 and 2006. Last appeared on Sunday 3 December 2006)
- Ryan Phelan (last appeared on Thursday 21 December 2006)
- Mark Aiston (presented on 8 September 2007 due to Brad McEwan, Rob Canning and Neil Cordy being all unavailable, also presented during the 2007–2008 summer period) – now no longer at Network 10
- Brad McEwan (Sunday to Thursday presenter between 2007 and 2011) – now no longer on television
- Matt White (1993–2004, 2018) – now at 7NEWS
- Rob Canning – now no longer on television
- Neil Cordy (fill-in) – now no longer working in the media
- Bill McDonald (fill-in) – now on 4BC Brisbane

=== Former panelists ===
- Josh Gibson (2018)
- Laurie Daley (2018)
- Scott Mackinnon (2019)
- Ant Sharwood (2019)

=== Former reporters ===
- Kelli Underwood – AFL and Senior all sports reporter, including Tennis; based in Melbourne – now at the ABC and Fox Sports Australia
- Amy Hetzel – Producer and reporter; based in Sydney
- Greg Rust – Motorsports reporter; based in Sydney (also motorsports host and commentator)
- Nathan Templeton – deceased
- Aimee McKay – Reporter, based in Sydney and Adelaide. Also hosted 'Seriously Footy' a Sydney Swans and Brisbane Lions AFL show, based in Sydney
- Nick Butler
- Lauren Markham

== Awards ==
Sports Tonight had been nominated for the Most Popular Sports Program for the Logies a total of 12 times.

The show was nominated in every year from 1997 until 2010, with the exception of 1999 (not awarded in this year) and 2001 (sports programs included those of the Sydney Olympic Games the previous year).
