= Kate Freebairn =

Australian journalist and television presenter

- Born: Adelaide, South Australia
- Occupations: journalist, television presenter
- Known for: presenting weather reports
- Notable work: 10 News First

Kate Freebairn is an Australian journalist and television news presenter.

From 2013 to 2021, Freebairn was a weather presenter for the Adelaide edition of 10 News First.

In 2020, Freebairn relocated to Melbourne, where she presented the weather for both the Melbourne and Adelaide editions of 10 News First, as well as appearing on The Project and Studio 10 until she went on maternity leave in late 2021.

In November 2022, Freebairn was announced as the anchor of a new local Adelaide edition of 10 News First, to be presented from 10's Sydney studio in 2023.

== Career ==
Freebairn was born and educated in Adelaide, completing a Bachelor of Journalism at the University of South Australia. While in her final year of studies, at 19 years old, she made an early start to her media career as a freelance news reporter at Channel Seven Adelaide. On completion of her degree, she accepted a full-time role with Southern Cross News, spending 10 months working as a video journalist in Broken Hill.

Freebairn made the move to Network 10 in 2008, working as a news reporter until 2014, when she replaced veteran weather presenter Jane Reilly who retired after 37 years in television.

When Network 10 underwent a major restructure in 2020, it was originally reported that Freebairn was one of the many redundancies of on air talent across Australia. The locally-presented Adelaide edition of 10 News First, anchored by Rebecca Morse, was axed in favour of centralising studio production to Melbourne and hiring one national weather forecaster for all 10 News First bulletins. However, Freebairn was ultimately retained after the network decided against hiring a national weather presenter. Freebairn temporarily remained in Adelaide due to COVID-19 restrictions where she commenced presenting the local weather segments for both Melbourne and Adelaide, but she eventually relocated to Melbourne.

In November 2022, it was announced that a new local Adelaide edition of 10 News First would be reintroduced, with Freebairn as anchor. The bulletin airs live from 10's Sydney studio into South Australia each weeknight.

Freebairn is the ambassador for a suburban Adelaide shopping centre, Burnside Village. She also spent two years as the face of South Australia's Fashion at the Races, and is an ambassador for F45 Training.

She also works closely with two charities, as an ambassador for Variety – the Children's Charity, to support children who are sick, disadvantaged or have special needs; and the Jodi Lee Foundation for bowel cancer prevention.
