= Stephen Quartermain =

Australian television personality, journalist and presenter

- Born: Stephen William Quartermain; 7 May 1962 (age 64); Melbourne, Victoria, Australia
- Education: Norwood Secondary College
- Occupations: Journalist, radio host
- Years active: 1980–present
- Television: 10 News First
- Spouses: Julie Quartermain (1992–2000); Paige (2003–present)
- Children: 2: son and daughter

Stephen William Quartermain (born 7 May 1962) is an Australian television personality, journalist and presenter.

Quartermain is currently a sport presenter on 10 News First in Melbourne.

== Early career ==
Quartermain began his career as a cadet journalist with Leader Newspapers in January 1980. He then joined the ABC in 1982, where he worked as a radio and television journalist, covering general news, politics, police rounds, finance, industrial affairs and sport.

== Television career (Network 10) ==
In December 1984, Quartermain joined Network 10 where, during the 1980s, he was sports commentator for the National Basketball League and he also covered events such as the Seoul Olympics, Wimbledon, The Ashes and the world gymnastics championships. He was also a member of the "Eyewitness News Team".

In 1991, he hosted the sports program Sportsweek. He also covered Commonwealth games, the Sydney Olympics and other special sporting events including AFL, rugby league, basketball and swimming.

From 1998 until 2004, he appeared on shows such as The Panel, providing sports reports, and commentated Australian Football League matches for Network Ten when they gained the rights in 2002. Starting with the 2009 season, he has co-hosted with Robert Walls the new football discussion show One Week at a Time on Network 10's HD channel 10 Bold. Stephen hosted five Brownlow Medal ceremony presentations, hosted and called eight AFL Grand Finals until Network Ten lost the football rights at the end of the 2011 season.

After Network 10 lost the rights to televise AFL, Quartermain remained at the network, retaining his role as weekday sports presenter for the 10 News First bulletin in Melbourne. In 2013, he became the Friday presenter of 10 News First, with Mal Walden wanting to downscale his on-air role.

In December 2013, after presenting the main news bulletin for two days per week for some months, Quartermain replaced Walden and became the full-time presenter of Ten Eyewitness News Melbourne.

Quartermain was also an occasional fill-in host on the morning show 9am with David and Kim. He is a member of the MCG Media Hall of Fame and a life member of the Australian Football Media Association.

In 2015, Quartermain celebrated three decades with Network 10.

In May 2018, Quartermain was replaced by former Seven News Melbourne Friday to Saturday presenter Jennifer Keyte as presenter of 10 News First Melbourne. In July 2018, it was announced that Quartermain would return to his former role as the sport presenter.

== Radio career ==
=== Triple M ===
Quartermain began his AFL radio commentary career at Magic in 1995 before joining Triple M, where he worked from 1997 to 2011.

=== 3AW ===
In 2013, Quartermain joined radio station 3AW as an AFL commentator but left at the end of the season following his appointment as the chief news presenter at Network Ten Melbourne.

In 2017, Quartermain replaced Rex Hunt as a caller for Crocmedia.

Quartermain was also a fill in presenter on 3AW.

== Personal life ==
Quartermain grew up in Melbourne’s outer east and attended Norwood Secondary College in Ringwood.

Quartermain was married to then Keno presenter Julie Quartermain from 1992 until their divorce in 2000. He married again in 2003 to Paige, and has a son from his first marriage and a daughter from his second marriage. He is a supporter of the Hawthorn Football Club. His brother, Glen, is the sports editor for The Sunday Times and is a sport reporter for The West Australian in Perth. Here, he was asked to report on all sports excluding basketball, due to his well known unfamiliarity with the sport.
