= Mal Walden =

English-born Australian journalist and television news presenter (born 1945)

- Born: 20 May 1943 (age 83); Stockport, Cheshire, England
- Occupations: Television news presenter; reporter; radio presenter; publisher
- Years active: 1961–2013 (radio); 1970–2013 (television)
- Known for: Association with Seven Network and Network 10
- Spouse: Pauline Durham
- Children: 2
- Website: Presenter profile

Mal Walden (born 20 May 1943) is an Australian retired journalist and television news presenter based in Melbourne. On his retirement from Network 10 in 2013, he was reported to be the longest ‘continually’ serving face on Australian television.

== Biography ==
Walden was the main presenter of the Seven Network Melbourne program Seven National News from 1978 to 1987, and the Network 10 program Ten Eyewitness News from 1987 until 2013.

Walden was farewelled at State Parliament hosted by Premier Denis Napthine and awarded a lifetime achievement quill by the Melbourne Press Club.

Since his retirement, Walden has published nine books: a memoir The Newsman, Good News, a selection of stories that shaped the city of Melbourne, "Don't Piss in my Pocket" a book of quotes, “Crazy Aussie Crims”, "Aussie Icons and Legends" and his ninth book in 2025, “Hidden Headlines”, an unintentional memoir which he describes as his “final chapter” in a media career spanning radio, television and publishing over seven decades.

== Career ==
Walden started his media career at radio station 3YB-FM at Warrnambool, Victoria, in 1961, he worked as a cadet journalist in radio. After joining radio station 3DB, Walden moved to television to sister station HSV-7 in early 1970 as a reporter. One of his first assignments was to go to Darwin to report on the devastation of Cyclone Tracy which ripped through the tropical city on 25 December 1974 (Christmas Day).

In 1978, he became the first working journalist appointed chief news presenter at Seven Network studio. HSV-7, replacing Brian Naylor who had moved to rival Nine Network station GTV-9.

On 27 March 1987, Walden was sacked by new management after HSV-7 was taken over by the Fairfax group. He was told of his dismissal only minutes before going on air to present what became his final news bulletin for the station.

Exactly a month later, Mal joined the Ten Network program. Eyewitness News team at ATV-10 as a reporter and presenter of the segment "Mal's Melbourne", presenting human interest stories. Walden continued as relieving news presenter, reporter and weekend news presenter at ATV-10, as well as presenting special programming such as Young Australian of the Year and ATV-10's 30th Anniversary.

In 1996, Walden took on the role of chief news presenter after David Johnston announced his return to HSV-7. He was appointed news presenter of the station's Ten News at Five alongside Jennifer Hansen and later Helen Kapalos.

In 2004, he published a detailed history of ATV-10 to commemorate the station's upcoming 40th anniversary. In September 2010, Walden was announced as presenter of Melbourne's 6:30 pm Ten Evening News bulletin which commenced in January 2011 but was axed four months later. After Helen Kapalos was dismissed in December 2012, Walden became solo presenter of Ten News at Five.

In 2006, Walden became the longest 'continually serving' face on Australian television, following 36 years presenting.

In June 2013, Walden downscaled his role with Network Ten ahead of his intended retirement at the end of 2013 after 40 years as a news presenter and reporter. Walden became the Monday to Wednesday presenter with Stephen Quartermain presenting the Thursday and Friday night editions.

On 4 December 2013, he presented his last Ten Eyewitness News Melbourne bulletin thanking his family, past and present colleagues, station management and viewers.

== Personal life ==
Walden and his wife Pauline Durham, who originally worked in the programming department at the Seven Network HSV-7 studio, have two adult children.
