= Natalie Forrest =

Australian television presenter (born 1973)

- Born: Perth, Western Australia
- Occupation: News presenter
- Years active: 1997–present
- Employer: Network 10

Natalie Forrest is an Australian television presenter and currently is the news presenter for 10 News in Perth.

Forrest started her career in journalism in 1997 in Albany, Western Australia as a TV journalist for Golden West Network, before moving to Bunbury as chief of staff and sports presenter.

In 2004, Forrest moved to Canberra to present Prime Television (now Seven) news updates across New South Wales, Victoria, and the Australian Capital Territory.

In 2008, Forrest participated in a group study exchange to Indiana, US, sponsored by Rotary.

Forrest has a Bachelor of Arts from Edith Cowan University in Western Australia, with a double major in English and Media. She also teaches broadcast journalism and presenting to camera at Canberra Institute of Technology.

On 13 March 2023, it was announced that she would host 10 News First after the bulletin was returned to the Perth studios.
