= Mark Aiston =

Australian sports journalist and sports presenter

Mark Aiston is an Australian sports journalist and sports presenter. He was previously a sport presenter on Ten Eyewitness News and breakfast radio presenter on Mix 102.3 and 1395 FIVEaa.

== Career ==
Aiston began his career in 1982 as a race announcer for 5DN before becoming sports host for ABC News in Adelaide. He joined Network Ten in 1996 as chief Australian rules football reporter, before being made sports presenter in late 1997. He has also worked for FIVEaa, and SEN 1116 (SEN 1323 in Adelaide).

Aiston has covered many sporting events at Network Ten, including: Sydney to Hobart, AFL, Melbourne Cup, Bathurst 1000, Indy Car, Moto GP, the Australian Grand Prix, the Adelaide 500, World Netball Championships and Australia Day celebrations.

In May 2014, Aiston resigned from Network Ten due to stress.

Aiston also plays a Kayfabe, National Wrestling Alliance liaison officer, at professional wrestling shows promoted by Zero1 Pro Wrestling Australia.
