= The Truth Is (TV program) =

2013 Australian current affairs TV series

- Genre: Current affairs
- Presented by: Hamish Macdonald
- Country of origin: Australia
- Original language: English
- No. of seasons: 1
- No. of episodes: 3

Production
- Production locations: Sydney, New South Wales
- Running time: 60 minutes

Original release
- Network: Network Ten
- Release: 3 June – 17 June 2013

The Truth Is was an Australian current affairs television program. It aired on Network Ten from 3 June to 17 June 2013, and was hosted by Hamish Macdonald. In the United States the program aired on Al Jazeera America.

== Episodes ==
- Episode 1: After the Kill/Sunny Chernobyl
- Episode 2: Soldiers of Fortune
- Episode 3: Welcome to Prison/Russia's Paris Hilton?
