= Eric Walters (newsreader) =

- Born: 4 July 1937; Brisbane, Queensland, Australia
- Died: 18 August 2010 (aged 73); Gold Coast, Queensland, Australia
- Occupations: Journalist; media trainer; lecturer; TV presenter
- Years active: 1961−2007
- Known for: Association with Nine Network

Eric Walters (4 July 1937 – 18 August 2010) was an Australian journalist, media trainer and former television presenter. He was best known for his long-running stint as early morning anchor for the Nine Network, both on the Today and National Nine Early Morning News.

== Career ==
Walters joined Channel 7 Perth in 1961, aged 24, as a reporter and presenter. In the 1970s, Walters worked at TEN-10 Sydney as a newsreader on Ten Eyewitness News. He joined the Nine Network in 1982 as newsreader and inaugural team member for its newly launched Today. He continued as national morning anchor with Nine until 1990 when he returned to Network Ten to again present its 6:00pm newscast in Sydney.

Walters presented the Ten Evening News with Eric Walters (later to become Ten Eyewitness News with Eric Walters) from mid-1990 until April 1991, when Ten undertook a major overhaul of its news programming. During his time with Ten, Walters anchored national, all-evening coverage of the War in the Gulf. Walters was also launch presenter for the Ten Evening News Second Edition in January 1991.

Following his time at Ten, another commercial network beckoned and, in 1992, Walters joined Seven as a reporter for its new current affairs program Real Life with Stan Grant.

He continued to work as a media trainer and public speaker, and was a guest on the 25th Anniversary Edition of Today.
