= Hugh Riminton =

Australian journalist and TV presenter

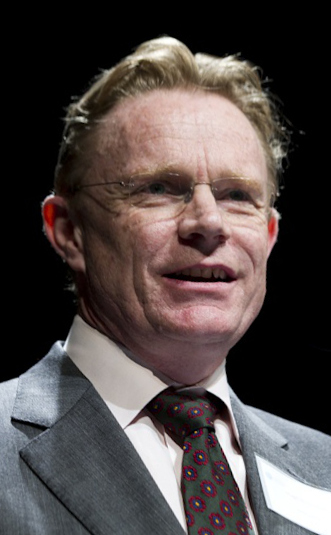
- Riminton in 2011
- Born: Hatton, Sri Lanka
- Citizenship: New Zealand; Australia
- Education: Macquarie University
- Occupations: Foreign correspondent; journalist; news presenter
- Employer: Network 10

Hugh Riminton is an Australian foreign correspondent, journalist and television news presenter.

He has worked for the Nine Network, CNN and Network 10, serving as a foreign correspondent, political editor and news anchor.

Riminton was co-anchor of Ten Eyewitness News with Sandra Sully from 2014 to 2017, and later served as Network 10's national affairs editor.

== Early life and education ==
Born in Sri Lanka, where his father managed tea estates, Riminton briefly migrated to the United Kingdom, then to New Zealand when he was five. He began work as a cadet reporter aged 17 in Christchurch before moving to Australia in 1983 to work for the Macquarie Radio Network in Perth and Melbourne.

Riminton graduated with a master's degree from Macquarie University focused on peacekeeping policy.

== Career ==
Riminton joined the Australian Nine Network as a Melbourne-based general reporter in 1989. He became its London-based correspondent in 1991.

Riminton has reported from more than 40 countries, notably South Africa, Uganda, South Sudan, Somalia, Rwanda, the Middle East, Russia, Afghanistan, Pakistan, India, South East Asia, East Timor, China, the United States and the Pacific Islands. He has received several honours for his reporting work, including a Logie Award (1996) for coverage of Tahiti's independence movement and a Walkley Award for his coverage of the 2000 Fijian coup d'état. He was also a Walkley Awards finalist for reportage in Papua New Guinea (1998), Kosovo (1999), Southern Sudan (1999) and Iraq (2003).

In 2001, he was appointed full-time presenter of the Nine Network's national evening news program Nightline, where he remained until joining CNN in December 2004. From Sri Lanka he reported and presented during CNN's Alfred Dupont Award-winning coverage of the 2004 Boxing Day tsunami. He also reported extensively from Iraq, Pakistan, China, Indonesia, Thailand, the Philippines and elsewhere during this time.

From January 2005 to September 2008, he co-anchored CNN Today with Kristie Lu Stout out of Hong Kong. During this time the program twice won the Asian Television Award for Asia-Pacific's best news program.

Riminton left CNN in 2009 to take up a position as senior political correspondent for Australia's Ten News. He hosted a Sunday morning show, Meet the Press, where he interviewed political leaders. He was also an occasional guest presenter on Network Ten's prime time alternative news program The Project.

In November 2010, Riminton was appointed Ten News' political editor and bureau chief in Canberra with Paul Bongiorno becoming national affairs editor. In 2011, he gained a second Walkley Award for his work, with reporter Matt Moran, in breaking the "Skype Scandal" in the Australian Defence Force, prompting more than half a dozen police and government inquiries. That year the pair received awards from the United Nations Association and the Australian Human Rights Commission for their work. They were shortlisted for the Graham Perkin Australian Journalist of the Year Award. In 2013, Riminton hosted current affairs program Revealed on Network Ten.

In February 2014, Network Ten appointed Riminton as a presenter of Ten Eyewitness News in Sydney with Sandra Sully. He co-anchored the bulletin until February 2017 when Sully took over as solo presenter.

In August 2020, Riminton commenced as occasional presenter of the Brisbane 10 News First bulletin, after the network consolidated production of bulletins for all cities to Melbourne (for Melbourne and Adelaide) and Sydney (for Sydney, Brisbane and Perth).

In June 2025, Network 10 announced that Riminton would anchor the new Friday edition of 10 News+ alongside Ursula Heger.

In September 2026, Riminton announced his departure and retirement from Network 10 after 17 years.

== Other roles and activities ==
Riminton is actively involved in Australian defence veterans' welfare issues and was a foundation board member of the charity Soldier On. He was also the foundation chair of the John Mac Foundation, founded by the 2017 New South Wales Australian of the Year, Deng Adut. Its primary work is funding university scholarships for Australian students from refugee backgrounds. Riminton is a member of the advisory board of Media Diversity Australia and is on the board of the Crescent Institute, a Sydney-based think tank.

In 2017, Hachette Australia published Riminton's autobiography, Minefields: A life in the news game.

== Personal life ==
Riminton was married to Sue Perry from the 1980s to the 1990s.

Natasha Stott Despoja, a leader of the Australian Democrats (served 2001-02) was in a relationship with Riminton until 2001.

Riminton and Stott Despoja had an unusual reunion in 2013 when they were both on the same panel for The Project coverage of that year's federal election.

Riminton was a single father when he met journalist Mary Lloyd in early 2007 while working at CNN. In 2009, the family moved to Canberra, Australia, where their son was born. The couple were married in Cambodia in 2010. Their daughter was born in 2011. They separated in 2023.
