= Good Morning Australia (1981 TV program) =

- Also known as: GMA
- Genre: Breakfast television
- Presented by: Co host Gordon Elliott; Sue Kellaway; Kerri-Anne Kennerley; Sandra Sully; Mike Hammond
- Country of origin: Australia
- Original language: English
- No. of seasons: 11
- No. of episodes: 2,877

Production
- Production locations: Sydney, New South Wales
- Running time: 120 minutes (including commercials)

Original release
- Network: Network Ten
- Release: 23 February 1981 – 18 December 1992

Related
- The Big Breakfast (1992–1995)

Good Morning Australia (or GMA) is an Australian breakfast television program that was broadcast on Network Ten. It aired from 23 February 1981 until 18 December 1992. It was seen as an Australian equivalent of ABC's Good Morning America and ITV's Good Morning Britain.

== History ==
The original Good Morning Australia breakfast television program was a news and entertainment show broadcast by Network Ten on weekdays from 7:00 to 9:00am. It debuted on 23 February 1981 with Gordon Elliott and Sue Kellaway co-hosting and with Di Morrissey as the roving reporter. Kellaway departed shortly after the program began and was replaced by Kerri-Anne Kennerley, who stayed with the program until the end of 1991 when she was replaced by Sandra Sully, Joy Smithers and then Sandra Sully again.

The male co-host position on GMA was filled by Tim Webster, Mike Gibson, Terry Willesee, Webster again, Mike Hammond and Ron Wilson.

The breakfast program competed with the Nine Network's Today (which launched in 1982 with Sue Kellaway, initial co-host of the Ten show) and usually placed second in the ratings behind Today.

In 1992, Good Morning Australia moved to the 6:30 to 8:30am timeslot, coinciding with the launch of The Morning Show with Bert Newton. Good Morning Australia, as a breakfast news program, was cancelled at the end of 1992. The name was taken over by Bert Newton's morning program and became Good Morning Australia with Bert Newton, which ran until 2005.

Since the demise of the original Good Morning Australia, other breakfast programs have arisen such as Sunrise and ABC News Breakfast, Weekend Today, Weekend Sunrise and Weekend Breakfast.

== See also ==
- List of Australian television series
