= Hamish Macdonald (broadcast journalist) =

Australian broadcast journalist and news presenter

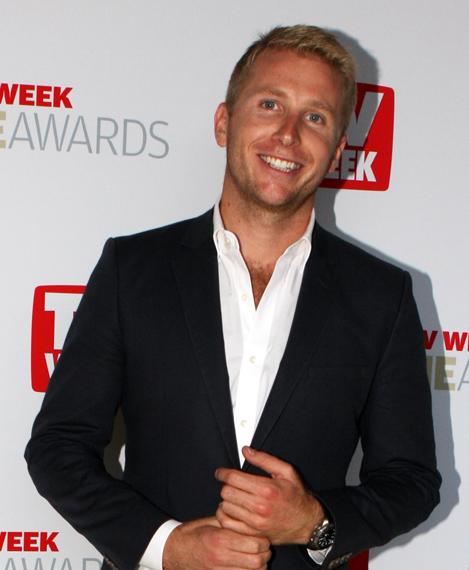
- Macdonald in 2012
- Born: Sydney, Australia
- Education: Charles Sturt University
- Occupations: Broadcast journalist, international affairs correspondent
- Years active: 2003−present
- Employer: ABC Radio National
- Spouse: Jacob Fitzroy (m. 2023)

Hamish Macdonald is an Australian broadcast journalist.

Macdonald currently hosts Sydney Mornings on ABC Radio Sydney.

From February 2020 until July 2021, Macdonald hosted the ABC's Q+A political panel discussion show. He previously worked at other networks, including Network 10, Channel 4, ITV and Al Jazeera English.

== Career ==
Upon earning a journalism degree from Charles Sturt University in 2002, Macdonald began a short stint as a reporter covering politics in Canberra with regional broadcaster WIN Television. He moved to the United Kingdom, where he reported for Channel 4 and ITV.

During his time with Channel 4 News in the UK, Macdonald honed his career as a news producer and reporter, covering major breaking stories at the time including the 2004 Asian tsunami and the London bombings. He reported live for Channel 4 and ITV News, and was the UK correspondent for Australia's Nine Network, Seven Network, and ABC.

=== Al Jazeera English ===
In 2007, Macdonald worked as a foreign correspondent working from Afghanistan for Al Jazeera English's regional headquarters in Kuala Lumpur, Malaysia; Al Jazeera English is the English-language sister channel of the Arabic network Al Jazeera. In the summer of 2006, he was hired as a news presenter at the Kuala Lumpur bureau of Al Jazeera English.

Macdonald won the "Young Journalist of the Year" award at the Royal Television Society awards in London on 20 February 2008.

Hamish later moved to Al Jazeera's London bureau, during which time he also acted as the UK correspondent for the Australian breakfast programme Sunrise. He left Al Jazeera English in June 2010.

=== Network 10 ===
Macdonald officially joined Network Ten in November 2010 as Senior Foreign Correspondent for Ten News and new 2011 flagship public affairs program 6pm with George Negus.

He announced he would be leaving Network Ten in September 2013. Rumours surfaced the network was underwhelmed with Macdonald's The Truth Is series and Macdonald was upset that Network Ten had not shown greater support for his work.

In 2017, Macdonald rejoined Network Ten, regularly hosting The Sunday Project and later being appointed the permanent host in January 2018. He remained in the position until December 2019 upon taking on his new role as host of Q&A on ABC.

In May 2019, Macdonald hosted the 2019 Australian federal election coverage on Network Ten.

In July 2021, it was announced that Macdonald would return to Network 10 from September to host The Project on Friday night and The Sunday Project, replacing Peter van Onselen.

=== ABC Television Network (U.S.) ===
On 6 January 2014, Macdonald joined the US television network ABC in a senior role as an international affairs correspondent. Despite being contracted to Network Ten in Australia until March 2014, Macdonald gained an early release from Ten which supported his new appointment. He was initially based in New York City, but moved to London later in 2014. His ABC contract reportedly allowed him to accept limited outside work with other organisations in certain circumstances.

=== ABC TV (Australia) ===
Macdonald hosted Q+A on Australia's ABC TV from February 2020, replacing Tony Jones as host of the panel program, until his final appearance in June 2021. Macdonald was at the helm of the show as it moved from Monday night to Thursday. With Macdonald at the helm, viewership plummeted from 411,000 in early 2020 to 280,000 a year later. By April 2021, the numbers had plunged even further, with just 224,000 metro viewers tuning in. Macdonald left the role after 18 months, stating that he was excited to be "moving into a new opportunity" and looked forward to working with the ABC in the future.

The abuse Macdonald received on Twitter while hosting Q+A, which prompted him to deactivate his account in January 2021, contributed to his decision to leave the program. Similarly, another ABC presenter, Lisa Millar, also decided to quit the social media site in September 2021 due to the abuse she was also receiving while hosting News Breakfast. Both Macdonald and Millar's experiences prompted a public discussion about the high level of personal abuse and bullying Australian journalists face on Twitter, and how the platform can better manage the issue.

In March 2026, Macdonald hosted a new series on the ABC titled The Matter of Facts.

=== ABC Radio National ===
As of 2023, Macdonald is a fill-in presenter and interviewer on Radio National's morning show, RN Breakfast, and reports for Foreign Correspondent on ABC Television.

=== ABC Radio Sydney ===
In 2025, ABC announced Macdonald as the new Sydney Mornings program host on ABC Radio Sydney from Mondays to Thursdays with Kathryn Robinson hosting the show on Fridays.

== Personal life ==
Macdonald completed his secondary schooling at The Scots College. He went on to Charles Sturt University where he obtained a Bachelor of Arts in communications journalism.

Macdonald shares a media pedigree with his siblings. His older brother Rory is a producer and reporter with ABC Radio Sydney, while his older sister Kari Keenan is a producer for 2UE.

In 2019, Macdonald came out as gay and is in a relationship with Jacob Fitzroy. They married in May 2023.

Media offices
Preceded by Originator; Peter van Onselen	The Sunday Project; Co-host with Lisa Wilkinson; January 2018 – December 2019; August 2021 – present	Succeeded by Peter van Onselen; Incumbent
Preceded by Tony Jones	Q+A; Presenter; February 2020 – July 2021	Succeeded by Stan Grant
