= Sandra Sully =

Australian news presenter

Sandra Sully AM
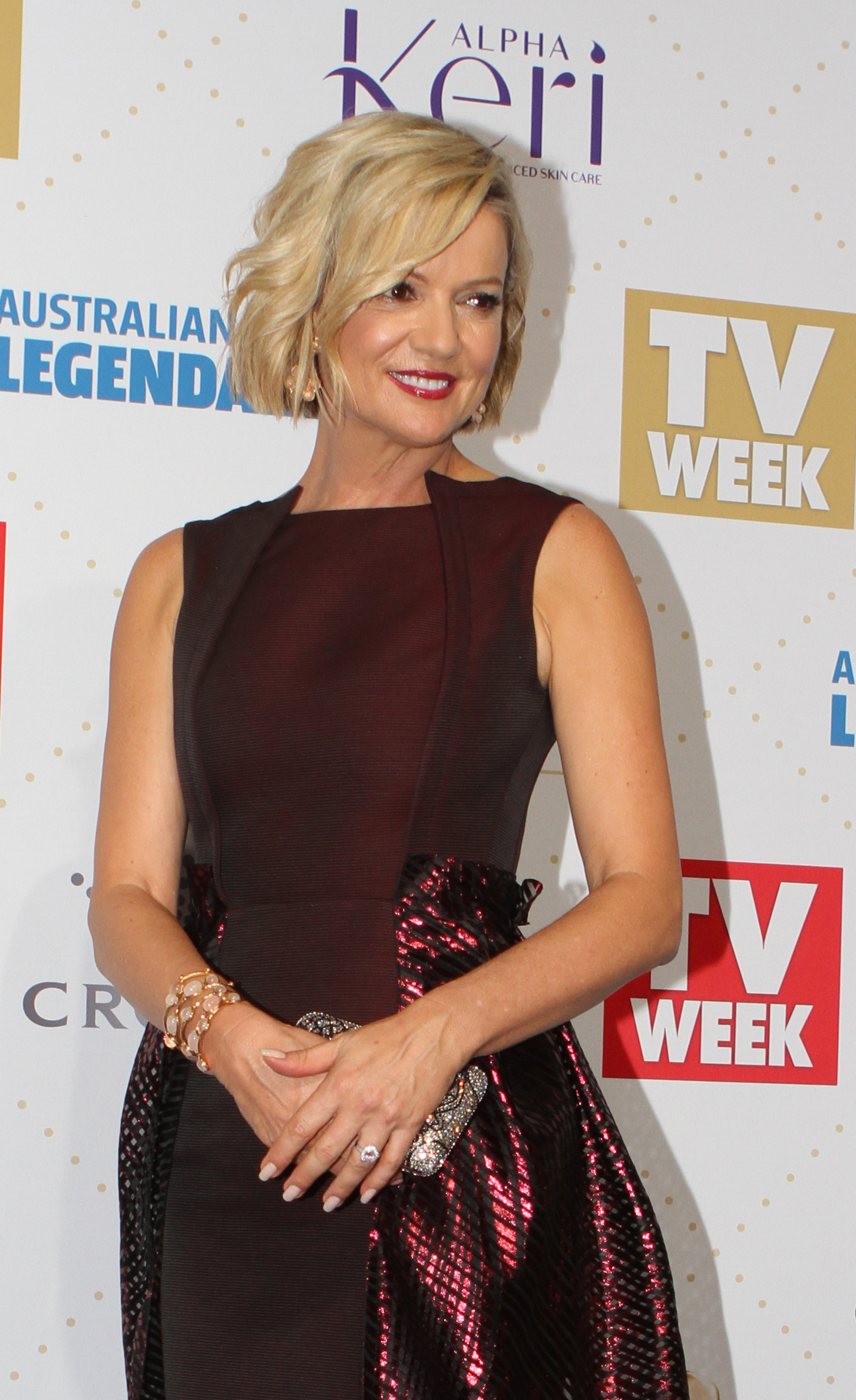
- Sully in 2016
- Born: Sandra Lee Sully; 18 February 1965 (age 61); Brisbane, Queensland, Australia
- Occupations: News presenter; TV host; journalist; editor
- Years active: 1988–present
- Employer: Network 10
- Television: 10 News
- Spouse: Symon Brewis-Weston (m. 2011)

Sandra Lee Sully AM (born 18 February 1965) is an Australian news presenter and journalist, currently presenting 10 News in Sydney.

Sully attended Brisbane State High School, graduating in 1978.

== Career ==
Sully started out presenting Ten Eyewitness News Brisbane in the 1990s, before presenting Ten's flagship Ten Eyewitness News Sydney 5:00 pm weeknight bulletin.

Sully is best known as a newsreader on Ten Late News from 1995 to 2011. She was the first Australian television journalist to cover news of the 11 September terrorist attacks. She was on air when the first attack occurred and, shortly afterwards, began presenting live breaking coverage.

Sully hosted the second season of game show Australia's Brainiest in 2005. She also hosted Cool Aid Australia's National Carbon Test in 2008.

Sully was the first woman to co-host the broadcast of the Melbourne Cup carnival and did so for seven years.

In June 2013, Sully and fellow Channel Ten journalist, Matt Doran, headed a police crime program called Wanted, investigating unsolved crimes and conducting interviews with victims' family and friends to appeal to the public to help solve the case by calling Crimestoppers.

As of 2018, Sully presented 10 News First Sydney. Between September 2020 and August 2024, Sully also presented the Queensland bulletin, produced from Sydney, as a result of changes to the 10 News First broadcast lineup. Sully ceased presenting the Queensland bulletin in August 2024, when a standalone edition presented by Sharyn Ghidella was revived from 2 September 2024.

In September 2023, Sully competed in the fifth season of The Masked Singer as "Fawn", she was eliminated in episode 2 after one performance.

Sully was appointed a Member of the Order of Australia (AM), in 2024 with the citation "For significant service to the media, charitable organisations and to the community".

=== Television ===
Year	Title	Role	Notes
1990s, 2020–24	Ten Eyewitness News Brisbane / 10 News First Queensland	Newsreader	
1995–2011	Ten Late News	Newsreader	
2005–2006	Australia's Brainiest	Host	
2011–present	10 News Sydney	Newsreader	
2013	Wanted	Co-host	with Matt Doran
2016	All Star Family Feud	Contestant	1 episode
2017	Have You Been Paying Attention?	Guest quiz master	1 episode
2018–2019	I'm a Celebrity...Get Me Out of Here!	Celebrity guest	2 episodes
2019	Hughesy, We Have a Problem	Celebrity problem	
2022	The Masked Singer	Self – Guest	2 episodes
2023	The Masked Singer	Self – Contestant	1 episode, eliminated in second episode

== Personal life ==
Sully was the victim of an apparent stalker in November 1997. She was pistol-whipped twice in the carpark of her home after returning from a late shift at Ten. At an awards ceremony in late 2006, she told guests she had hired "a couple of security guards" following the incident.

Sully married in 2011, becoming stepmother to her husband's adopted daughter.
