= Elizabeth Chong =

Australian celebrity chef (born 1931)

Elizabeth Chong AM
- Born: Yut Yi Chong; 27 May 1931 (age 95); Canton (modern day Guangzhou), China
- Citizenship: Australia
- Occupations: Chef; restaurateur; cooking teacher; author; television presenter; cultural activist
- Known for: Celebrity chef; television host/personality; author; former cooking teacher
- Notable work: The Heritage of Chinese Cooking
- Culinary career
- Cooking style: Traditional chinese
- Current restaurant
- Wing Lees (Melbourne)
- Television shows
- Elizabeth Chong's Tiny Delights; Chinese Cooking School; Good Morning Australia (cooking segment)
- Award
- Prix de la Mazille for Cookbook of the Year (1994)

Elizabeth Chong AM (Chinese: 陳月意 born 27 May 1931), original Cantonese name Yut Yi Chong is a Chinese-born Australian celebrity chef, restaurateur, cookbook author, media and television host and personality and former cooking teacher. She is known for her TV series Elizabeth Chong's Tiny Delights and having been a regular presenter on breakfast show Good Morning Australia.

She is known as a pioneer of the industry, the first celebrity chef and promoter of introducing traditional Chinese cuisine to Australia.

== Early life ==
Chong was born in Canton (known now as Guangzhou), China, to a Chinese mother and Australian-born father of Chinese descent, whose father had arrived in Australia to the 1850s. She has a brother (Tony) and a sister born in Hong Kong.

Her mother was told to leave the country under the White Australia Policy; due to this policy she did not know about the Lunar New Year celebrations until she was in her 20s.

Her father William Chen Wing Young was a restauranteur from Melbourne, and operated a food processing plant called Wing Lees where he is believed to have created and marketed the most widely used modern recipe for the dim sim, (a dumpling similar to a Siu Mai) in 1945. Chong also states that her father created the first bean sprout factory in Australia.

Chong came to Australia when she was three years old with her mother, father, grandmother and three other children and settled in a residence near the Queen Victoria Markets. She was educated at Presbyterian Ladies' College, Melbourne.

Chong never aspired to follow the family tradition in the restaurant business, but rather to become a concert pianist or journalist. After a year of being a primary school teacher, she decided she wanted to teach the art of cooking.

== Career ==
=== Publishing and television ===
Chong released her book The Heritage of Chinese Cooking in 1994, which won the Prix de La Mazille as International Cookbook of the Year.

Chong is best known for her television appearances on Good Morning Australia as well as her Chinese Cooking School (1960- 2016) and Chinese cookbooks including The First Happiness (first published in 1982).

In 2003, her TV series Elizabeth Chong's Tiny Delights aired with a companion book release of the same title.

== Personal life ==
Chong started her own cooking school in the late 1950s when she began teaching some of the mothers from her children's state school in the Melbourne suburb of North Balwyn. Her first home recipes were published by Belle Vue State School Mothers' Club. The Cooking School celebrated its 50-year anniversary in 2011. Apart from this, as an ambassador for Chinese culture in association with her cooking she gives guided tours of the Chinatown precinct in Melbourne

In 2017, Chong appeared on Studio 10, which reunited the prsenters of Good Morning Australia, including host Bert Newton, his wife Patti Newton, and regular members including fellow cooking presenters Ken James and Gabriel Gaté.

Others included the series music director John Forman, Belvedere, Phillip Brady, Rhonda Burchmore and Tonia Todman as well as advertorial presenters Susie Elelman and Moira McLean.
