= Chinese restaurants in Australia =

Chinese cuisine in Australia

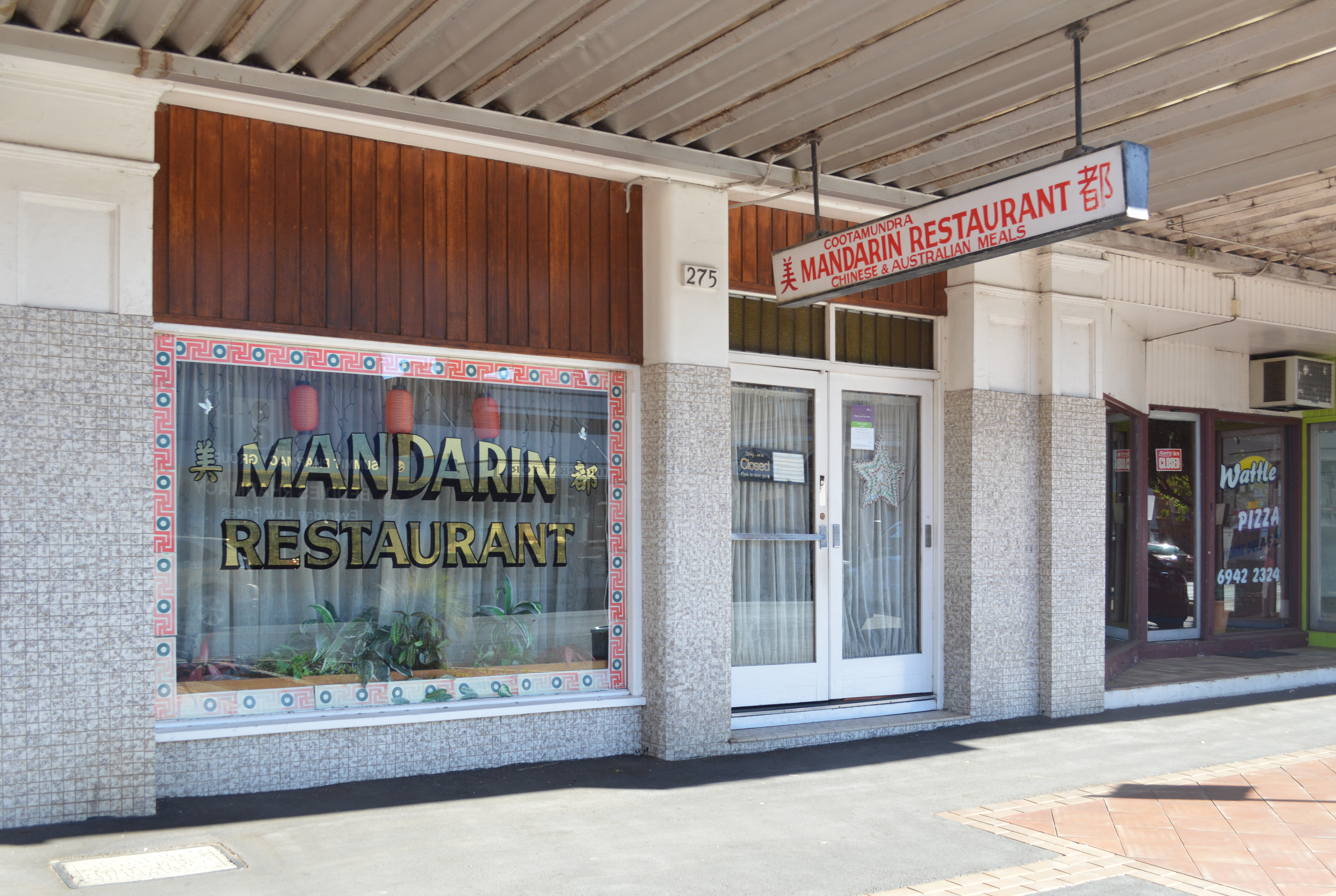
The Mandarin Restaurant in Cootamundra, New South Wales in 2015

At the beginning of the 21st century, Chinese restaurants have been present in a significant majority of Australian cities and towns for over fifty years, and in many places for over one hundred and fifty years.

They emerged as commercial enterprises on the Victorian gold fields in 1854.

== History ==
Chinese food began to be established in Australia during the middle of the 19th century by Chinese indentured labourers on outback stations, many found work there as cooks and also in country pubs.

Chinese migration to Australia massively increased with the gold rushes during the 1850s, and some of these migrants opened food stores providing hot meals to Chinese gold diggers. European gold diggers also sometimes used these stores. They were referred to as "cookhouses", or as "cookshops", and were often associated with other Chinese businesses.

One third of all cooks in Australia were Chinese by 1890.

Chinese migration to Australia essentially stopped from 1901 with the White Australia policy but cooks were granted exemptions and from 1934 Chinese traders with established businesses were able to bring non-relative workers in from China. Family members were brought in under different names, but were often not trained cooks and had to learn on the job. Chinese restaurants were established in many country towns and all cities by the 1970s.

=== Australian Capital Territory ===
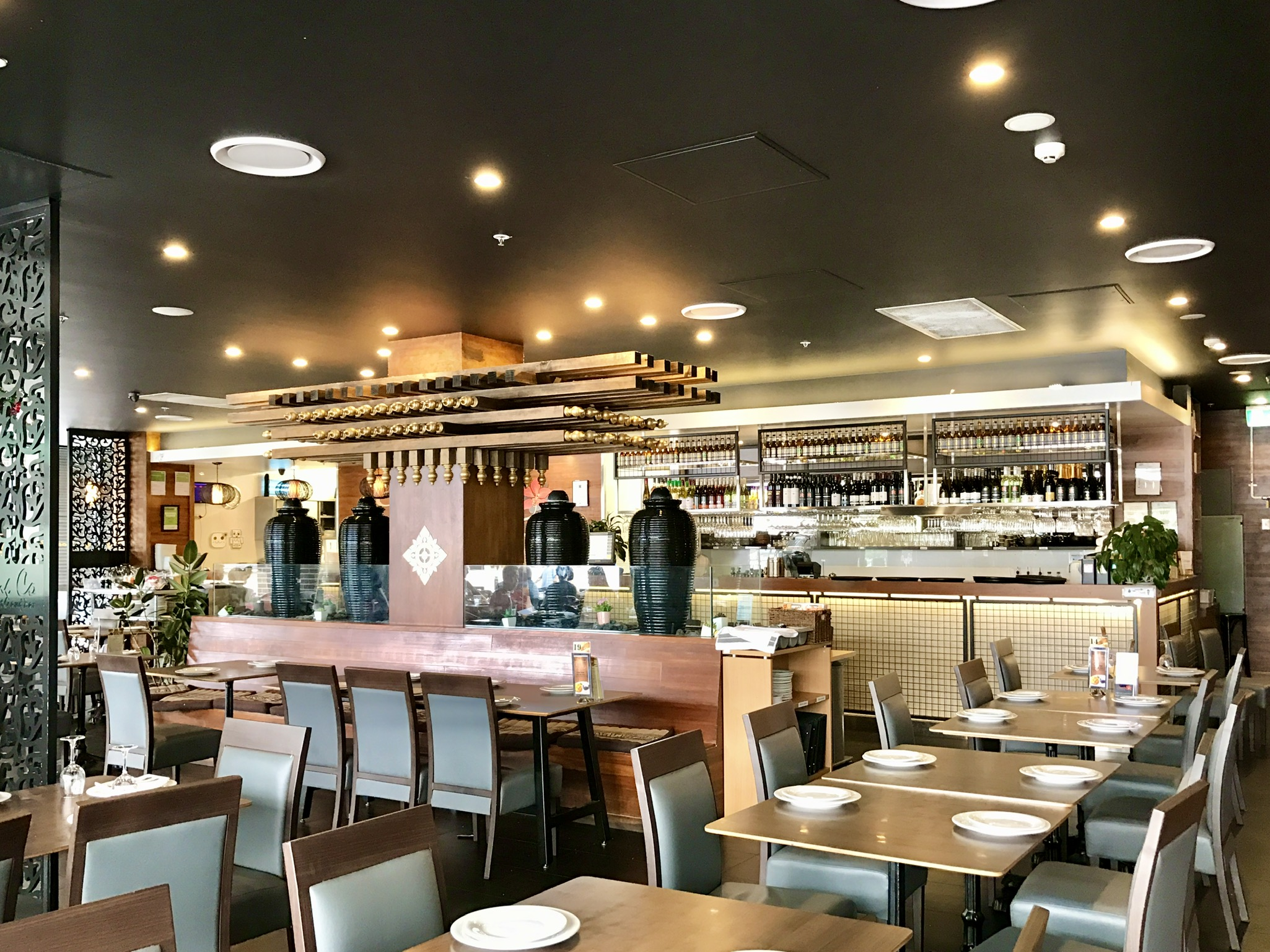
The interior of a Chinese restaurant in Canberra during 2016

The oldest Chinese restaurant in Canberra opened in 1962, and was still operating in 2016.

=== Victoria ===
The first documented Chinese restaurant in Australia was at Bakery Hill, Ballarat, on the Victorian goldfields, owned by Chin Thum Lok, opening in 1854. The restaurant did not serve Chinese style food, but instead provided English style food such as roast beef.

In Melbourne eighteen Chinese restaurants were listed in 1920, by 1939 eight had been established outside of the city's Chinatown precinct, and by 1970 there were one hundred and fifty operating throughout the city and suburbs. It was in the chinatown restaurant Wing Lee, that the Dim Sim was first invented as a localised Yum Cha dish. It has subsequently also become famous for the unique larger version sold at South Melbourne Market.

== Ingredients and dishes ==
The style of dish presented has changed over time.

In the 1960s and 1970s typical dishes were sweet and sour pork, or beef and black beans, with fried rice. In the 21st century more traditional Chinese ingredients have become widely used. Tofu was once unheard of, but is now readily accepted.

The majority of early Chinese migration came from Guangdong Province in southern China, and later from British Hong Kong, meaning Cantonese cuisine has traditionally dominated Chinese restaurants in Australia. This has included yum cha, which has been popular to serve in the more upmarket Chinese restaurants in Australia, as well as dishes such as San Choy Bow, a lettuce wrap dish consisting of minced meat and vegetable filling in a savoury sauce. The ingredients used typically favour fresh vegetables and fruit, along with fish, poultry and pork, served with rice, herbs and spices. The dim sim, a popular snack throughout Australia, was inspired by Cantonese cuisine and invented by a Cantonese chef in Melbourne's Chinatown.

== See also ==
- Australian Chinese cuisine
- Christmas Island cuisine
- Succulent Chinese Meal
- Hong Kong cuisine
