= Lettuce sandwich =

Type of sandwich wrap

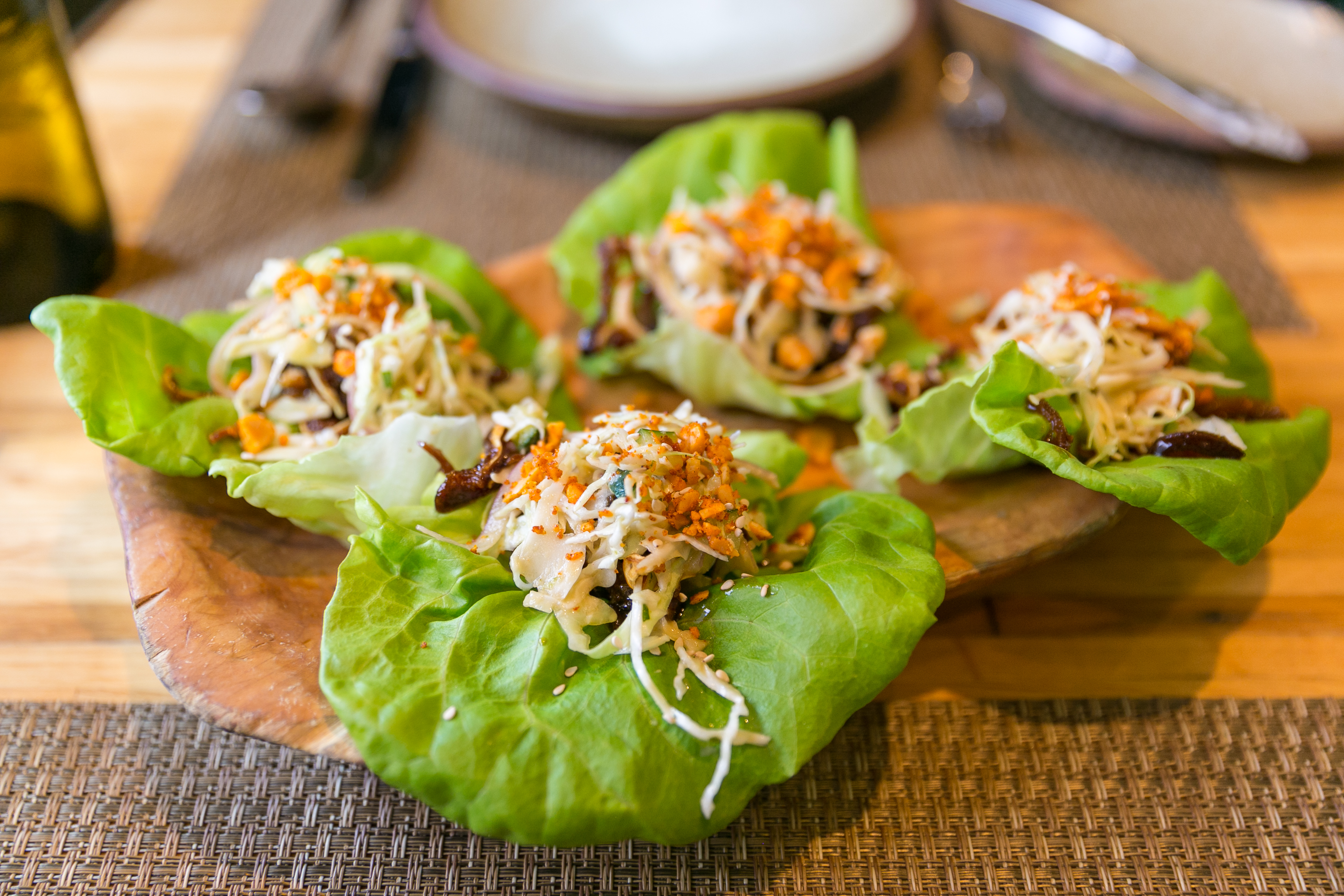
- Lettuce wraps
- Type: Sandwich or wrap
- Main ingredients: Lettuce, bread or filling

A lettuce sandwich is a wrap with lettuce substituted for the bread, or a sandwich with a filling consisting primarily of lettuce. It should not be confused with other sandwiches that use lettuce as one of many ingredients, such as the BLT sandwich or the tomato and lettuce sandwich.

The lettuce sandwich has a long history in both the United States and the United Kingdom. It has been used as a metaphor to represent things like mundanity, weakness and poverty. In more recent times, sandwiches that use lettuce in place of bread, including lettuce hamburgers, have symbolized diets including the keto diet.

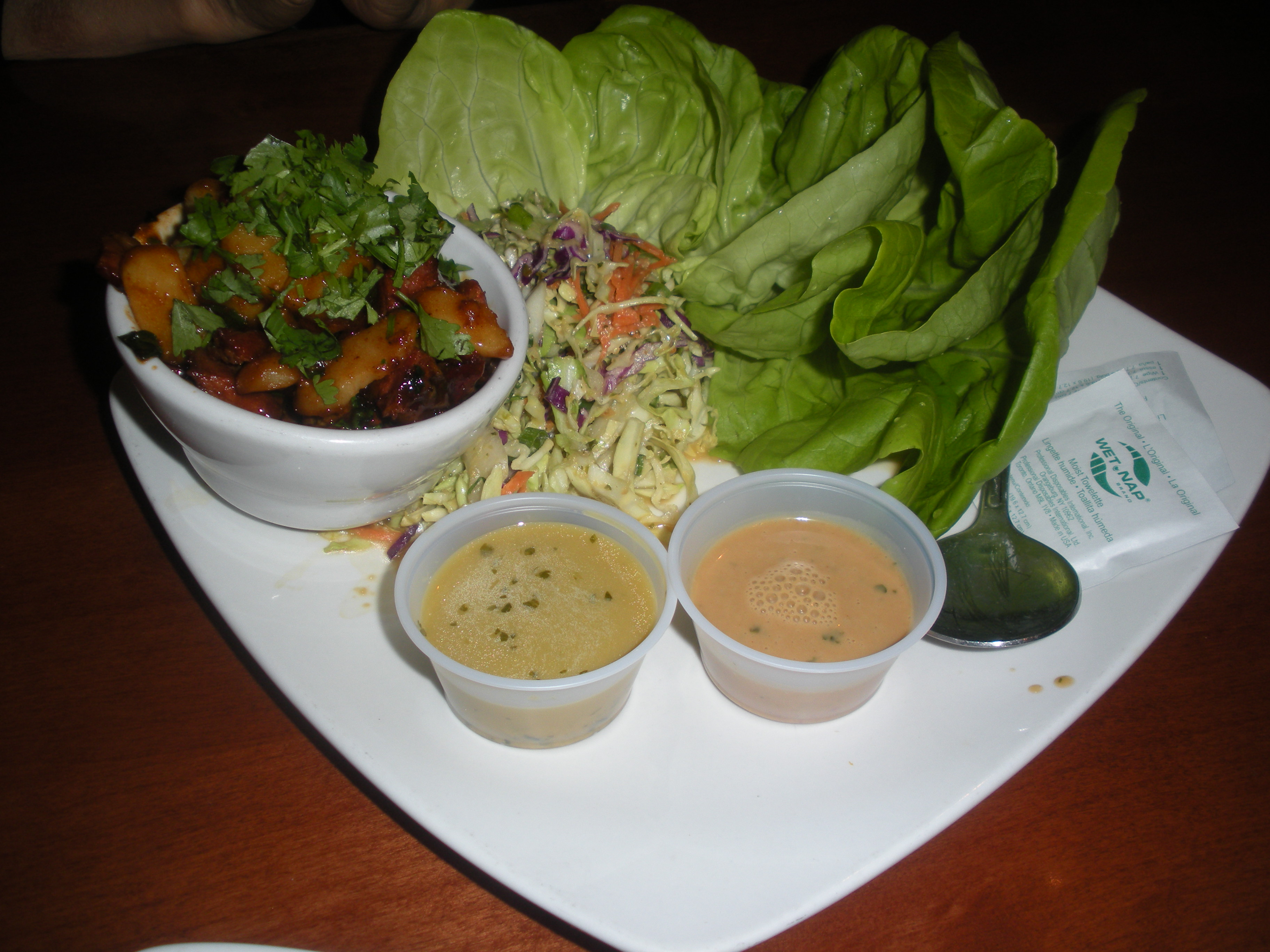
Shanghai-style lettuce wraps with sauces at Auburn Alehouse

== History ==
The lettuce sandwich was mentioned in print as early as 1894 in The Century Illustrated Monthly Magazine.

The lettuce sandwich (bread with a lettuce filling) was a common food in the United States and England during the first half of the 20th century. The “Veggie Delight” sandwich from Subway restaurants is an example of a fast food version of the Lettuce Sandwich. Lettuce sandwiches have been served at fine luncheons, The lettuce sandwich (bread with lettuce filling) is also an old-fashioned English food. Lettuce sandwiches are still eaten in the US and elsewhere.

== Preparation ==
=== Bread and lettuce ===
When making a bread and lettuce sandwich, the bread is sometimes buttered or spread with mayonnaise, and then lettuce is placed between the two slices of bread.

=== Breadless lettuce sandwich ===
To prepare a breadless lettuce sandwich, roll any filling inside a large leaf of lettuce or place it between two leaves of lettuce. The west-coast hamburger chain In-N-Out offers a lettuce sandwich variation called "the Protein" or "Protein Style" on their hidden menu. It is a hamburger patty wrapped in lettuce instead of the traditional bun.

== Metaphors ==
The lettuce sandwich has also become a cultural metaphor to represent something unattractive, unappealing, weak, or mundane. In this sense, the term "limp (or soggy) lettuce sandwich" is often used. Being on a "lettuce sandwich diet" refers to getting by on the bare minimum with absolutely nothing more than the necessities of life. The lettuce sandwich is sometimes indicative of poverty or hardship, and also represents a lack of sufficient nourishment. The lettuce sandwich is considered a humble, tasteless food. It can be used to represent disappointment as in "life need not be a lettuce sandwich over the sink".

== Health benefits ==
A lettuce sandwich has been claimed to be a sleep-inducing remedy for insomnia. Lettuce sandwiches (no bread) are also eaten to promote weight loss. Lettuce sandwiches (bread filled with lettuce) can also be a good food choice for the health-conscious. The lettuce sandwich (bread filled with lettuce)—which contains no meat—is mentioned in a book about vegetarian diets.

== See also ==
- BLT
- Lettuce soup
- List of sandwiches
- San Choy Bow
- Ssam
- Toast sandwich
