= New Zealand Chinese cuisine =

New Zealand Chinese cuisine (Māori: Kai hainamana o Aotearoa) is a style of cooking developed by Chinese migrants who arrived to New Zealand. Its roots are derived mainly from Cantonese cuisine as a result of migrants from Guangdong working in New Zealand's gold fields during the mid-to-late 19th century, with the food being adapted to local tastes.

== History ==
Chinese emigrants first came to New Zealand in 1842. However, it was not until the Otago gold rush in the 1860s did significant Chinese immigration happen. Initially the majority were gold miners coming from Australia and California during the end of their respective gold rushes, the numbers coming from Guangdong greatly increased over the prospect of a new gold rush. When the gold ran out, many of those who stayed in country ran grocery stores, market gardens and other small-scale ventures. Some even worked as chefs and opened their own restaurants. The first restaurant which sold Chinese food first opened in Dunedin during the gold rush era and by the early 20th century, most major towns in New Zealand had at least one chinese restaurant.

== Differences from other regional cuisines in China ==
New Zealand Chinese cuisine is derived mainly from Cantonese cuisine that developed from the early Chinese settlers that came during the gold rush. Many of the early Chinese settlers brought their own fruit and vegetable crops with them. Vegetables like Chinese cabbages, mustard greens, spring onion, radishes, celery and chrysanthemum as well as chives, garlic and coriander were grown mainly for domestic consumption. Meat, something that was eaten only on special occasions in China was also eaten more frequently in the diets owing to its relative affordability. Pork was the most favoured, though other meats like beef, mutton, chicken and duck were also consumed and European fruits and vegetables, as well as foodstuffs like Worcestershire sauce, vinegars and fruit preserves were adopted by the Chinese due to their availability.

Chinese food that was served in restaurants was entirely different from Chinese food that was cooked at home. While many restaurants initially served authentic food to Chinese clientele, overtime food was modified to attract European customers and very often, served non-chinese meals such as fish and chips and steak. At home however, many Chinese preserved most of their culinary traditions, one of the most notable being splitting and roasting whole pigs inside a purpose-built ovens on special occasions, though some concessions were made when certain ingredients weren't available such as Kau yuk, a dish normally made with taro was often substituted with beetroot.

== Dishes ==
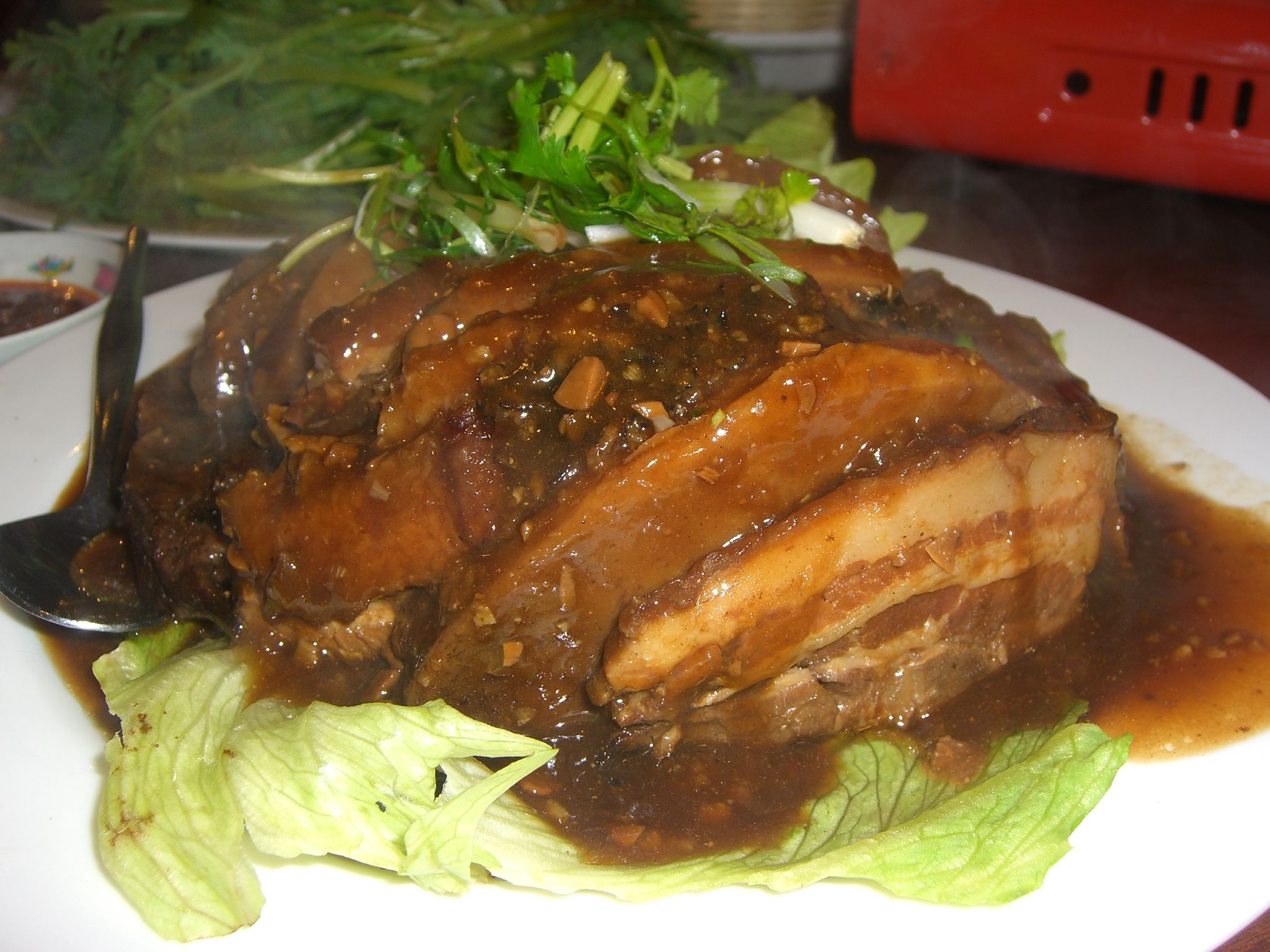
Kau yuk, a dish made from pork and taro. The New Zealand version replaces taro with beetroot.

- Chop suey – Stir fried meat and vegetables in a starch-thickened sauce.
- Chow mein – Noodles stir fried with meat and vegetables.
- Egg foo young – An egg omelette containing meat and vegetables.
- Fried rice – Rice fried at a high heat with egg, meats and vegetables.
- Kau yuk – A dish of alternating pieces of pork and taro steamed and fried in a savoury sauce. In the southern parts of New Zealand where the climate wasn't suitable for taro, beetroot or potato were used as a substitute.
- Lemon chicken – Cut pieces of chicken that are battered and deep fried, covered in a sweet and sour lemon sauce.
- San Choy Bau – Flavoured pork mince wrapped in lettuce leaves.
- Siu yuk – Roasted pork cooked in a charcoal oven.
- Sweet and sour – Meat, usually pork or chicken that has been fried and covered in a sweet and sour sauce.
- Wonton – A type of dumpling containing a variety of fillings, either deep fried or cooked in soup.

== See also ==
- Fusion cuisine
- Australian Chinese cuisine
- British Chinese cuisine
- American Chinese cuisine
- Canadian Chinese cuisine
- New Zealand cuisine
- Chinese cuisine
