= William Chen Wing Young =

Chinese-Australian businessman and entrepreneur (1896-1974)

William Chen Wing Young (1896–1974) was a Chinese-Australian businessman and entrepreneur in Melbourne. He is best known as the inventor and populariser of the iconic Australian dim sim in the 1940s, known colloquially as a "dimmy", and as the father of well-known Australian celebrity chef and cooking personality Elizabeth Chong.

== Early life and family ==
Young was born in Wahgunyah, Victoria into a Chinese-Australian family. His father, Chen Ah Kew, was an early Chinese pioneer, who arrived in Victoria in the 1850s from Guangdong, China and initially worked as a gold miner, before becoming a storekeeper on the Murray River. In 1901, when Young was about five, the family returned to China.

He returned to Melbourne as a teenager with several of his brothers, and started a number of business during the period the White Australia Policy was in place.

== Business career ==
Young and his siblings went on to establish Wing Young & Co. in 1924-25, a family business with interests in growing and importing bananas, fruit and vegetable wholesaling, furniture manufacturing and later food production. He became a successful fruit merchant and operated one of the largest wholesale fruit businesses at Queen Victoria Market.

During the 1940s, Young established Wing Lee, a restaurant and food manufacturing business in Melbourne's Chinatown called Wing Lee. He noticed Australians who dined there particularly enjoyed the Cantonese siu mai dumpling, traditionally served as part of dim sum. He thought it would be a great snack at the football, so he designed it for Australian taste and mass production, larger with a thicker wrapper, allowing it to be frozen, transported and reheated. He called it the "dim sim", which went on to be a staple takeaway food around the country.

== See also ==
- Australian Chinese cuisine
