= SSAM =

SSAM may refer to:

- Ssam, meaning "wrapped", refers to a dish in Korean cuisine
- St. Scholastica's Academy of Marikina
