= Good Morning Australia (1992 TV program) =

Former breakfast television program in Australia

- Also known as: The Morning Show (1992); GMA with Bert Newton
- Genre: Talk show Variety show
- Presented by: Bert Newton
- Country of origin: Australia
- Original language: English
- No. of seasons: 14
- No. of episodes: 3,213

Production
- Production locations: Melbourne, Victoria
- Running time: 120–150 mins (inc. ads)

Original release
- Network: Network Ten
- Release: 20 January 1992 – 16 December 2005

Related
- Til Ten (1989–1991); 9am with David & Kim (2006–2009)

Good Morning Australia (or GMA), also known as GMA with Bert Newton, originally titled The Morning Show, is an Australian breakfast television variety program on Network Ten hosted by Bert Newton between 20 January 1992 and 16 December 2005 featuring regular segments and celebrity guests.

The program aired from 9:00 am to 11:00 am or 11:30 am. The show was a lead in to the 11:30 News.

== Program history ==
The show debuted on Network Ten on 20 January 1992 with the title The Morning Show, changing its name the following year from 1 February 1993 to Good Morning Australia (aka GMA and GMA with Bert Newton) after the breakfast news program with the same name on the same network ended. The original GMA had aired between 1981 and December 1992.

The Morning Show had replaced the long running Sydney based Til-Ten which was presented by Joan McInnes. GMA was Australia's first national morning talk program, unchallenged ratings wise until October 2002, when the Nine Network launched Mornings with Kerri-Anne.

For most of 1992, the program was produced in Melbourne from Ten's Nunawading Studios but later that year, production of the show moved to level 4 at Network Ten's South Yarra studios.

The show featured numerous guests in each episode, often singers and actors. Regular segments included cooking, crafts, gardening, movie reviews and parenting. There was a segment called "In Bed with Bert", where four of his regulars answer questions that Newton reads. The questions were sent from viewers at home.

Often the off-camera crew acted as the studio audience. Starting in 2005 the public could view the taping on Fridays.

Bert Newton's sign off at the end of each program was: "We'll see you tomorrow [or ‘Monday’ on Friday's show] morning at 9:00".

Originally the program was live-to-air on Mondays and Tuesdays, and live-to-tape on Wednesday, Thursdays and Fridays. From mid-2004 onwards, the show became live-to-air five days a week to compete with Mornings with Kerri Anne.

In October 2005, Network Ten announced that GMA would be cancelled at the end of the year after a fourteen-year run. Following this announcement and after months of speculation, Bert Newton decided to leave Ten and return to the Nine Network.

The final live edition of Good Morning Australia aired Friday 16 December 2005, and included guest appearances by former GMA regular Susie Elelman and Maria Venuti. The following week, GMA switched to summer mode, with the summer show airing from 19 December 2005. The summer series of Good Morning Australia ended on 27 January 2006, a week before the premiere of 9am with David and Kim.

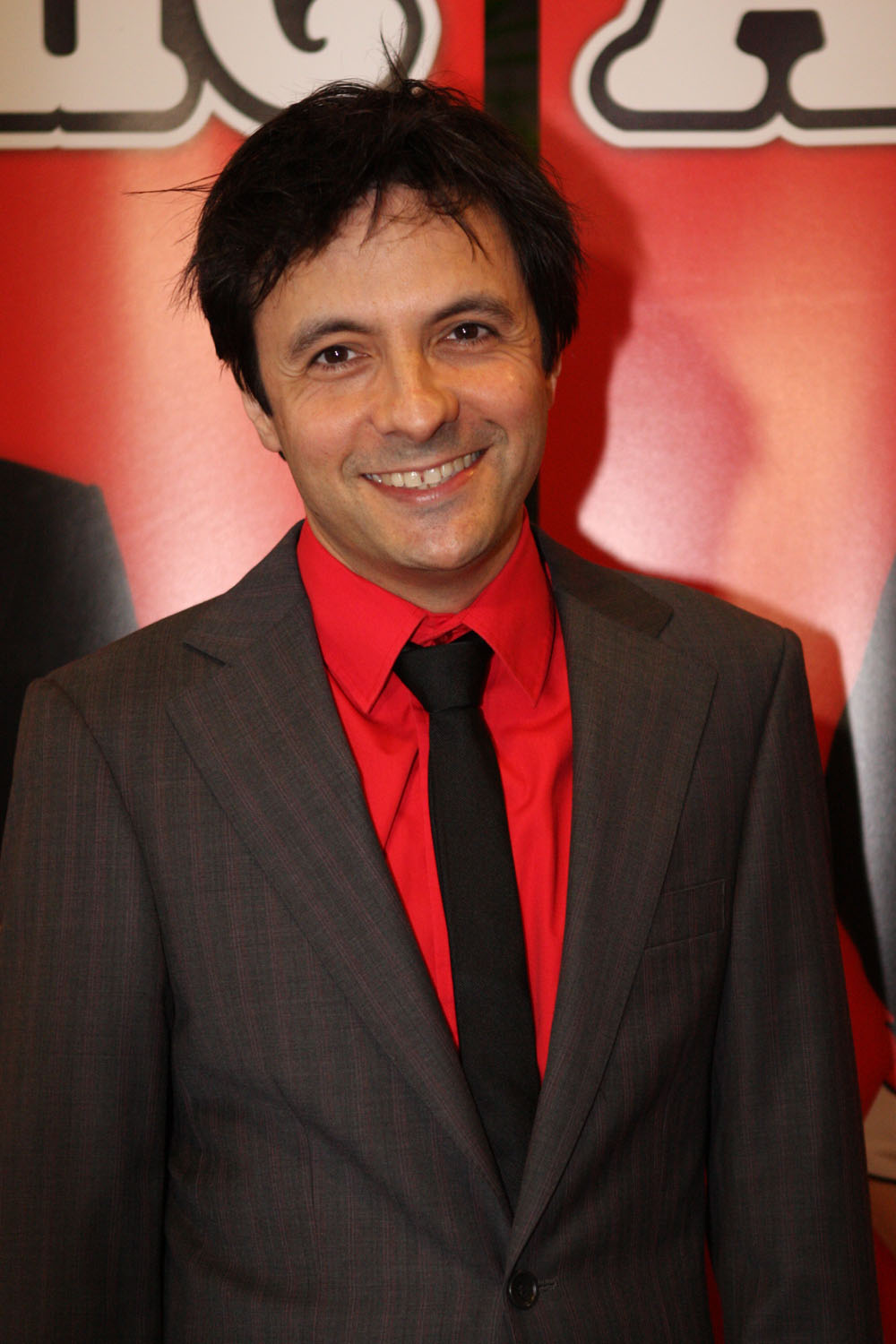
John Foreman, musical director on GMA

== Musical direction ==
John Foreman was the program's musical director from the program's inception in 1992 for GMA until his retirement in 2004, when Mark Amato was appointed as his replacement for the final two years.

== Musicians, entertainers and singers ==
Some of the musicians that have performed on the show include:

Performers
The Seekers
Toni Lamond
Tina Arena
Guy Sebastian
Rhonda Burchmore
Abby Joyce
Carmen Hendricks
Anthony Callea
Reverend Funk and the Horns of Salvation
Cosima De Vito
Gloria Gaynor
Tommy Rando
Susie French
Melissa Langton
Mark Jones
Get O Roukes The Gear
Ricki-Lee Coulter
Jimmy Cupples
Richard Mortimer
Kate DeAraugo
Hayley Jensen
Matt Amy's Really Big Band
Shannon Noll
Joey Dee
Jerson Trinidad
Tina Cousins
Lucy Gale
Angela Librandi
Matt Hetherington
Kellie Wright
Tracy Kingman

== Regular segment contributors ==
The program had many regular contributors to various topical segments. Robert Mascara, the floor manager and assistant director for the programme's entire run, appeared as "Belvedere", the official food taste tester during the cooking segments.

=== Celebrity chefs ===
Chefs	Specialist cooking style
Elizabeth Chong	Chinese cuisine
Iain Hewitson	Various
Gabriel Gate	French cuisine
Dorinda Hafner	South African cuisine
Ken James
Tonia Todman (Note: (Note: Todman took on the dual role of presenting both the cooking segment and the craft segment.))

=== Cast Regulars ===
Name	Segment
Patti Newton	Various segments/singer
Lauren Newton	Reporter
Paul Bongiorno	Politics
John-Michael Howson	Entertainment reporter
Phillip Brady	Collectibles/nostalgia (milestones and tombstones)
Karen Moregold	Astrology
Jane Edmondson	Gardening
Chyka Keebaugh	Homemaking and styling
Tonia Todman	Crafts
Nicky Buckley	Parenting
Julie Summerfield	Pet care
Jemma Gawned	Beauty
Virginia Hey	Beauty
Colette Mann	Gadgets
Ann-Maree Biggar	Gadgets and DVD reviews
Val Jellay	Movie reviews
Shane Bourne	DVD reviews
Axle Whitehead	Music reviews
Robert Mascara	As Belvedere on-air personality/studio floor manager
Bruce Mansfield	Collectibles
Yves Hernot	Antiques valuation and art

Shannon Watts joined GMA in May 2005 replacing Ed Phillips who went on to host Temptation for the Nine Network. Shannon was soon put out in the field hosting segments from the AFL Grand Final, the Australian Grand Prix and the Gold Coast Indy 300. Not long after, Shannon was appointed as an advertorial presenter on GMA. Shannon did over 160 episodes of Good Morning Australia. Shannon stayed with GMA until the show's end and went on to be a reporter on the replacement show 9am with David & Kim.

== Fill-in presenters ==
A number of people have filled in for Bert Newton as presenter over the years when he was either ill or on leave. The people that have filled in for him include:

Name	Tenure	Notability
Maggie Tabberer (AM)	1998-1999 (various)	Fashion editor/media personality
Kerri Anne Kennerley	1995 before Monday – Friday	TV presenter, host of Midday and Mornings with Kerri-Anne
Rove McManus	2004– Friday 10 June 2005	TV host/executive host of Rove Live
Daniel MacPherson	Monday 13 June 2005	Actor and Dancing with the Stars host
Mark Holden	Tuesday 14 June 2005	Musician and judge on Australian Idol
Stephen Quartermain	Wednesday 15 June 2005	Sports presenter of Ten News First Melbourne
Gretel Killeen	Thursday 16 June 2005	host of Big Brother

== Advertorials ==
The show featured a number of advertorial presenters

Name	Tenure	Reference
Moira McLean	1992–2005	,
Susie Elelman	1993–1999	
Ed Phillips	2000 – May 2005	,
Shannon Watts	September 2005 – December 2005)	
Marianne van Dorslar	199?–2005	

The advertorials were for products from various local and international direct selling companies Danoz Direct, Guthy Renker and Global Shop Direct.

== Related shows ==
Prior to Newton's tenure as host of GMA Network Ten in Melbourne ran a similar program titled Good Morning Melbourne hosted by Roy Hampson and Annette Allison During Hampson's tenure. The program had a number of different titles, such as The Roy Hampson Show and Roundabout.

== Successor ==
Network Ten successor to GMA was 9am with David & Kim, hosted by musician David Reyne and journalist/news anchor Kim Watkins, which had a similar format, however 9 am was not filmed in front of the live studio audience.

== See also ==
- List of longest-running Australian television series
- List of Australian television series
- 9am with David & Kim
- Elizabeth Chong's Tiny Delights
