= The Good Food Show =

Australian cooking series (1989)

The Good Food Show was an Australian cooking series presented by Gabriel Gaté and broadcast by the ABC in 1989. The eight part series was produced by the CSIRO and focused on healthy eating habits and nutritious food. It drew on the work of CSIRO nutritionist Dr David Tapping who also plays a role onscreen. The ABC was criticised by The Age and Tribune for the poor choice of timeslot for the show.
