= Dim sim =

Chinese snack originating from Australia

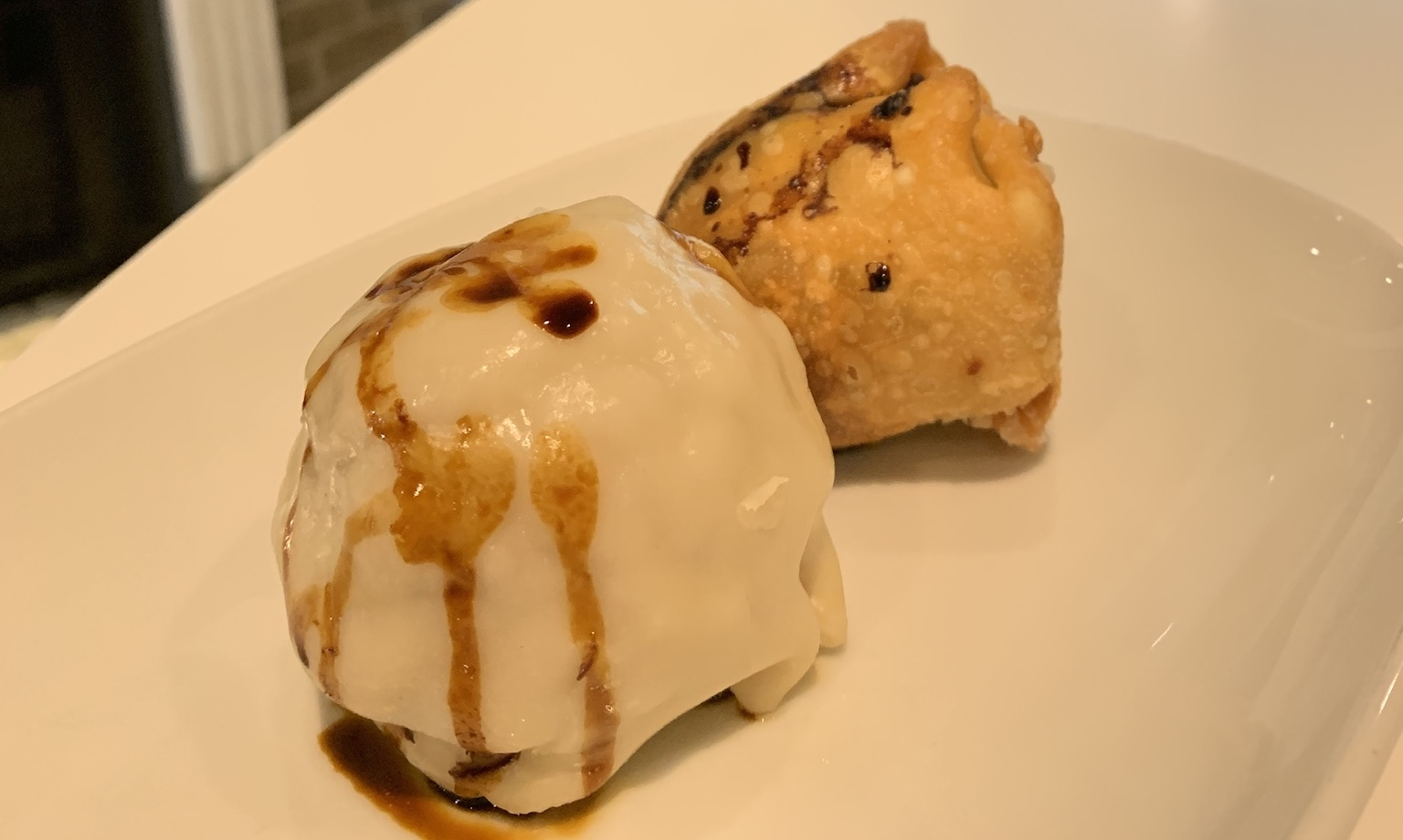
- Fried and steamed dim sim
- Type: Dumpling
- Course: Appetiser or snack
- Place of origin: Australia
- Serving temperature: Hot
- Main ingredients: Meat, cabbage
- Variations: Vegetarian (assorted fillings)

A dim sim is a meat and vegetable dumpling snack, inspired by Cantonese Dim Sum, that is popular in Australia. It was popularised in the 1940s by William Chen Wing Young, a Chinese Australian born in Wahgunyah, Victoria in 1896. Young's family originally came from Guangdong, and he was the father of Australian celebrity chef Elizabeth Chong. The name derives from the pronunciation diam1 sim² (點心) in Teochew.

== Description ==
The commercial snack food normally consists of minced meat, cabbage, and seasoning, encased in a wrapper similar to that of a traditional siu mai dumpling. They are typically cylindrical, or sometimes a larger, globular shape. They can be steamed or deep-fried, and are commonly dressed or dipped in soy sauce, tomato sauce or sweet chilli sauce. An alternative way of cooking dim sims is to barbecue them, by cutting the dim sim in half lengthwise and placing on a hot barbecue. A barbecued dim sim is known as a "Moe crayfish", "cray" or "oyster" after the Victorian township of Moe. Vegetarian dim sims normally contain cabbage, carrot, vermicelli, Chinese shiitake mushrooms or other vegetable fillings, along with seasoning, although these are not generally available in commercial outlets.

Dim sims differ from typical Chinese dumplings in that they are often much larger, have a thicker, doughier skin and are shaped more robustly. They are primarily sold in fish-and-chip shops, service stations, corner shops, and some Chinese restaurants and takeaway outlets in Australia. Supermarkets, some Chinese yum cha wholesale outlets and Asian frozen food companies also commonly sell this snack frozen for home cooking. They can also be found at Chinese food outlets in New Zealand.

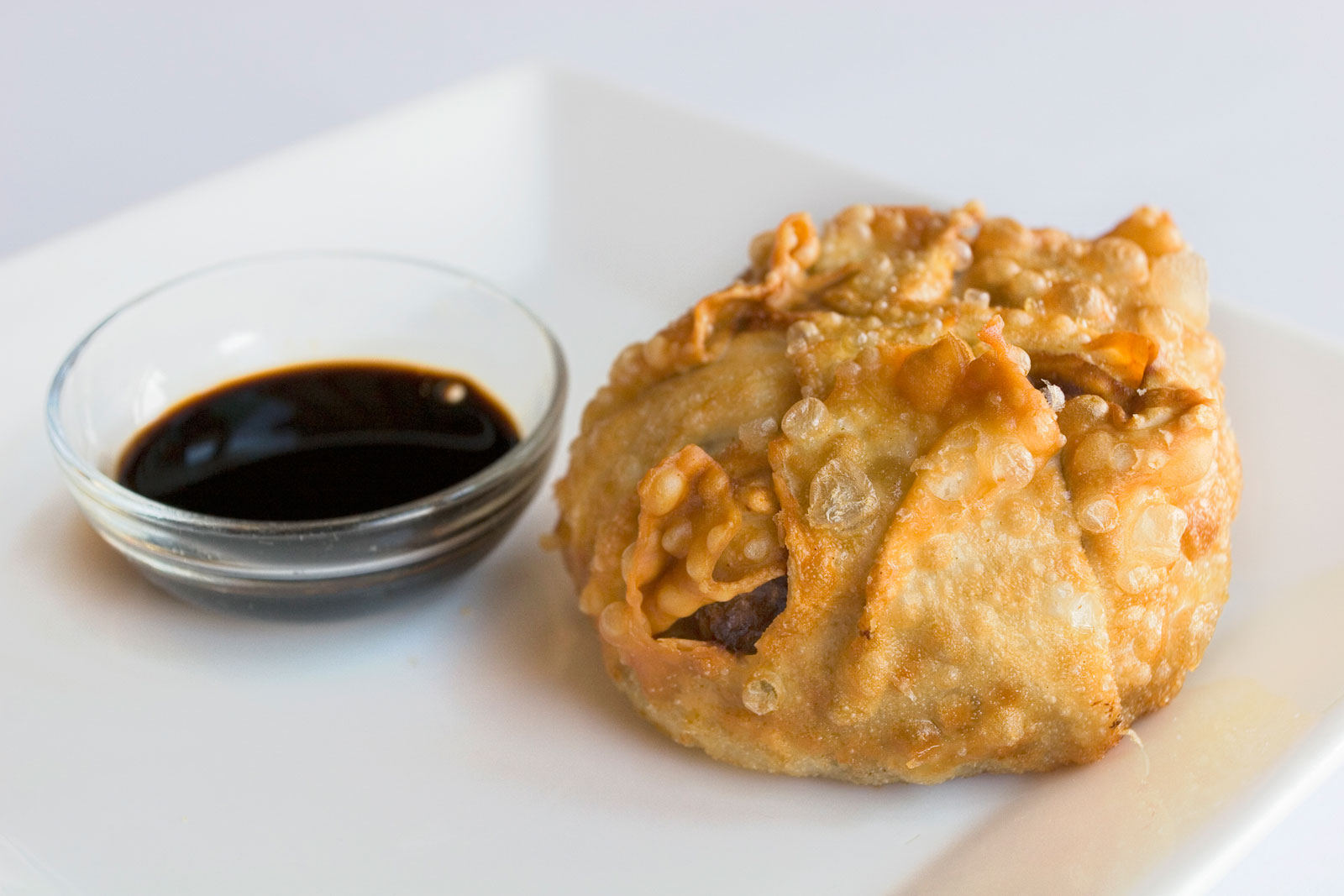
A fried dim sim (South Melbourne style) with soy sauce

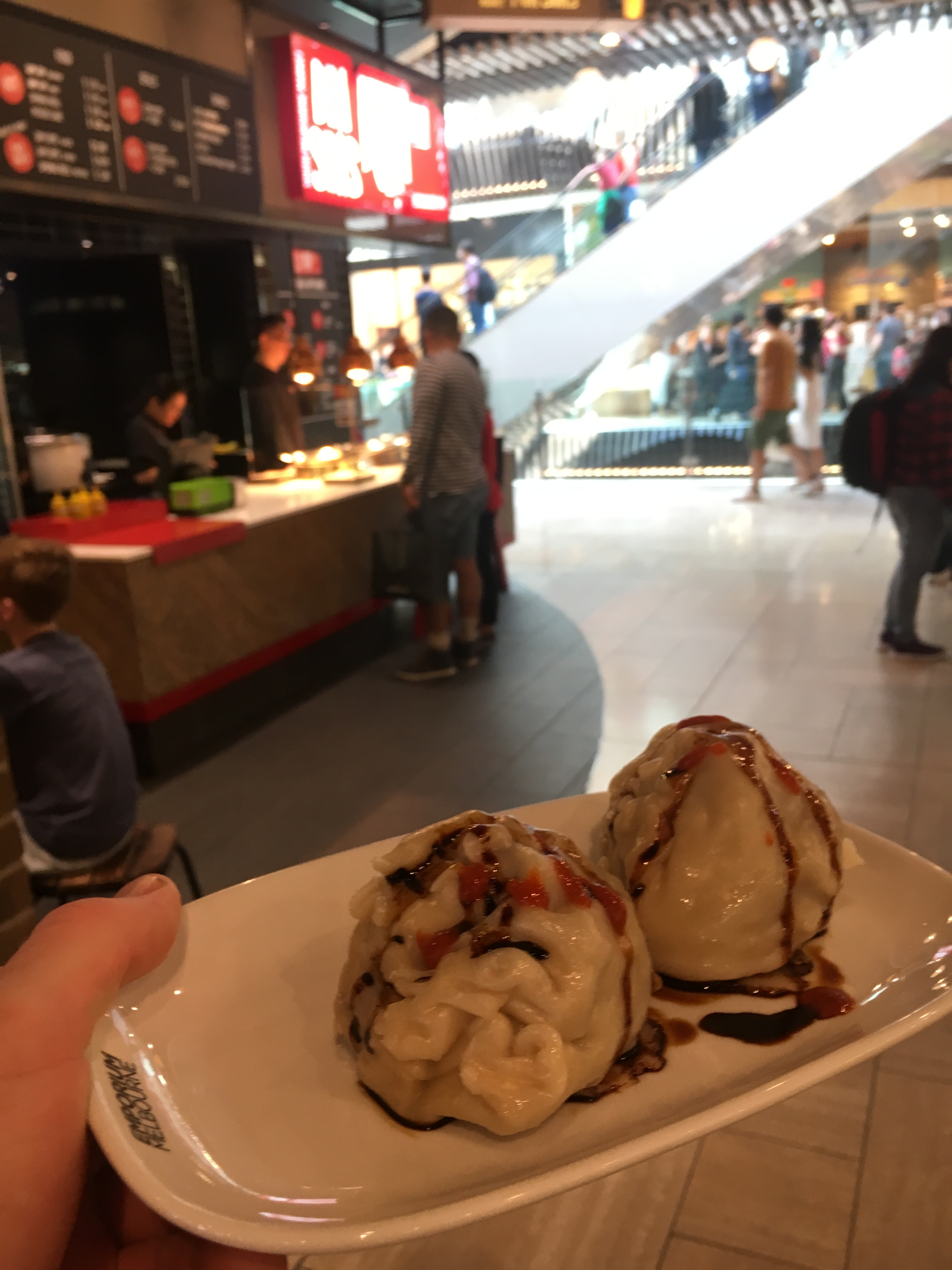
Steamed dim sim

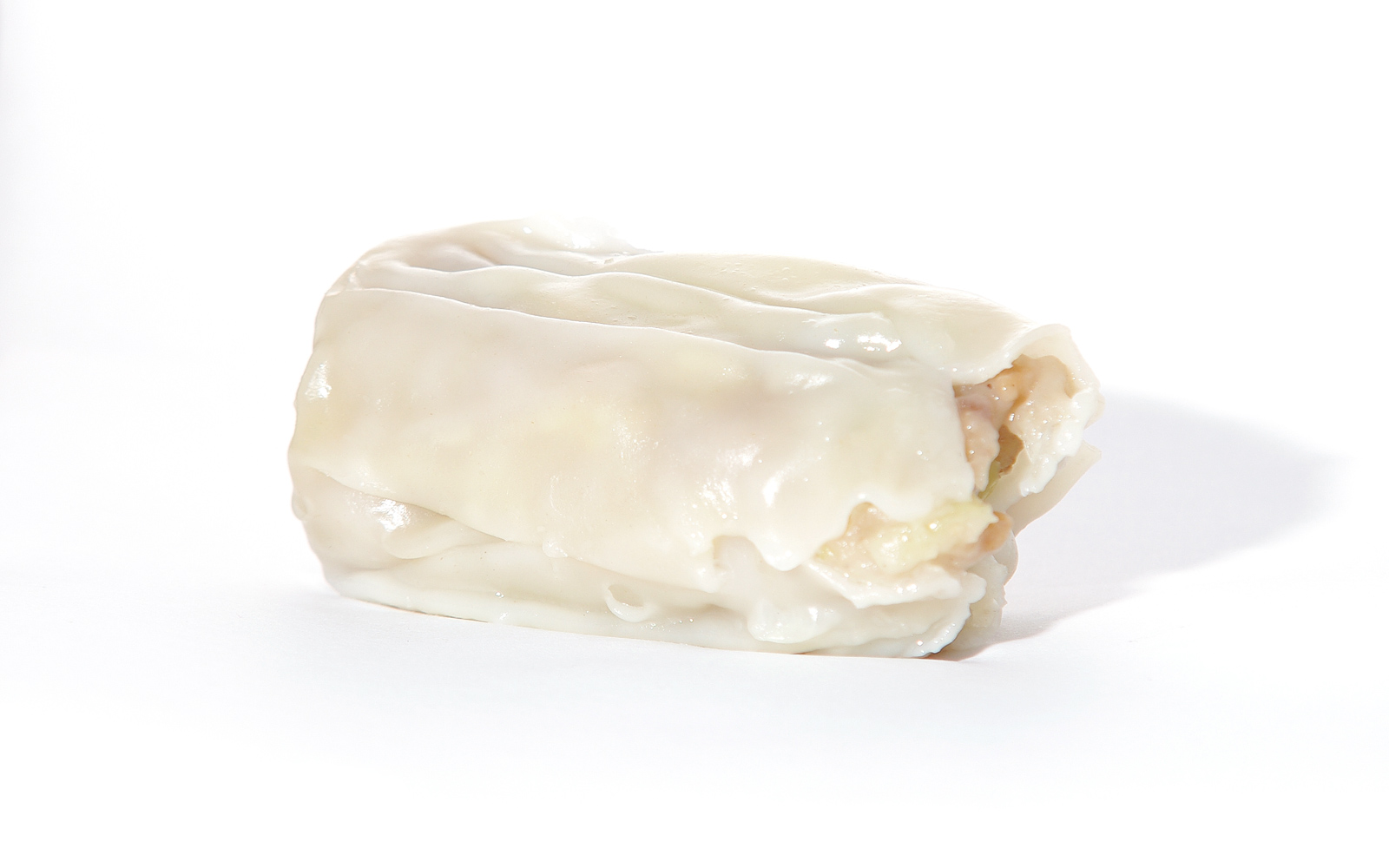
Steamed dim sim

The term dim sim dates as far back as 1928, although the modern recipe of the dish most likely was developed in Melbourne's Chinatown in 1945 by entrepreneur William Chen Wing Young for his food processing company Wing Lee. The larger, globular version of the dish is commonly known as a "South Melbourne dim sim" due to it originating at South Melbourne Market.

== Original recipe ==
William Wing Young's "original recipe" for the dim sim was presented by Elizabeth Chong on the second episode of the ABC1 TV show Myf Warhurst's Nice (20 June 2012). It consisted of pork, prawns, water chestnuts, spring onions, and soy sauce wrapped in a soft skin-like wrapper.

== See also ==
- Dim sum
- Australian Chinese cuisine
- Chinese restaurants in Australia
