= Susie (TV program) =

- 2007 Intertitle
- Genre: Talk and Variety show
- Created by: Susie Elelman
- Presented by: Susie Elelman
- No. of seasons: 2
- No. of episodes: 198

Production
- Executive producer: Susie Elelman
- Running time: 60 minutes

Original release
- Network: WIN Television
- Release: 25 June 2007 – 20 June 2008

Susie is an Australian morning talk and variety show that was produced by WIN Television and hosted by Susie Elelman in Wollongong, New South Wales. The hour-long show premiered 25 June 2007, was broadcast on WIN Television each weekday morning at 9.30 am.

It was also broadcast on two Nine Network affiliate stations, NWS-9 Adelaide and STW-9 Perth which were both owned by the WIN Corporation. In these two cities, the show remains at 12 noon. The show was axed at 20 June 2008, with affiliate Nine clearing some space for 3 stages with the Nine News major expansion.

On 16 August 2007 as part of several changes to WIN's daytime television schedule, Susie was also at 9:30 am timeslot.

== Segments ==
Susie featured several regular guests, whilst including experts in the fields of health, family, career, cooking, relationships, beauty and fashion. Helen Hope specialised in astrology, Dr. Rob Zammit focused on pet advice, Georgina Walker featured in segments using psychic powers, Adam Richards was the program's gardener and featured in gardening segments, whilst Janie Larmour was the fitness expert.

== Regulars ==
- Adam Richards
- Claudia Keeche
- Dr. David Knight
- Georgina Walker
- Helen Hope
- Janie Larmour
- Dr. Jenny Smiley
- Dr. Rob Zammit
- Shelley-Taylor Smith
- Karan Hayes
- Dr. Suzy Green
- Victoria Hanson
- Sherryl McFarlane
- Nicole Bell

== See also ==
- List of Australian television series
