= Christmas Island cuisine =

Culinary traditions of Christmas Island

- Country or region: Christmas Island
- See also: Australian Chinese cuisine, Malay cuisine

The cuisine of Christmas Island can best be described as an eclectic combination of traditional Australian cuisine and Asian cuisine, particularly meals from Malaysia and Indonesia.

== Population ==
As of 2009, the island had just 1,200 residents: 65% Chinese Malaysians, 20% Malaysian Malays, and 15% of European descent. There are also small Malaysian Indian and Eurasian communities on the island.

Previously an additional 2,000+ people lived at the Christmas Island Immigration Reception and Processing Centre. Their meals were flown in by the Australian Government via operator Serco. The centre was closed in October 2018 but re-opened in 2019, and as of early 2020 hosted only one family of Tamil asylum seekers.

== Food supply ==
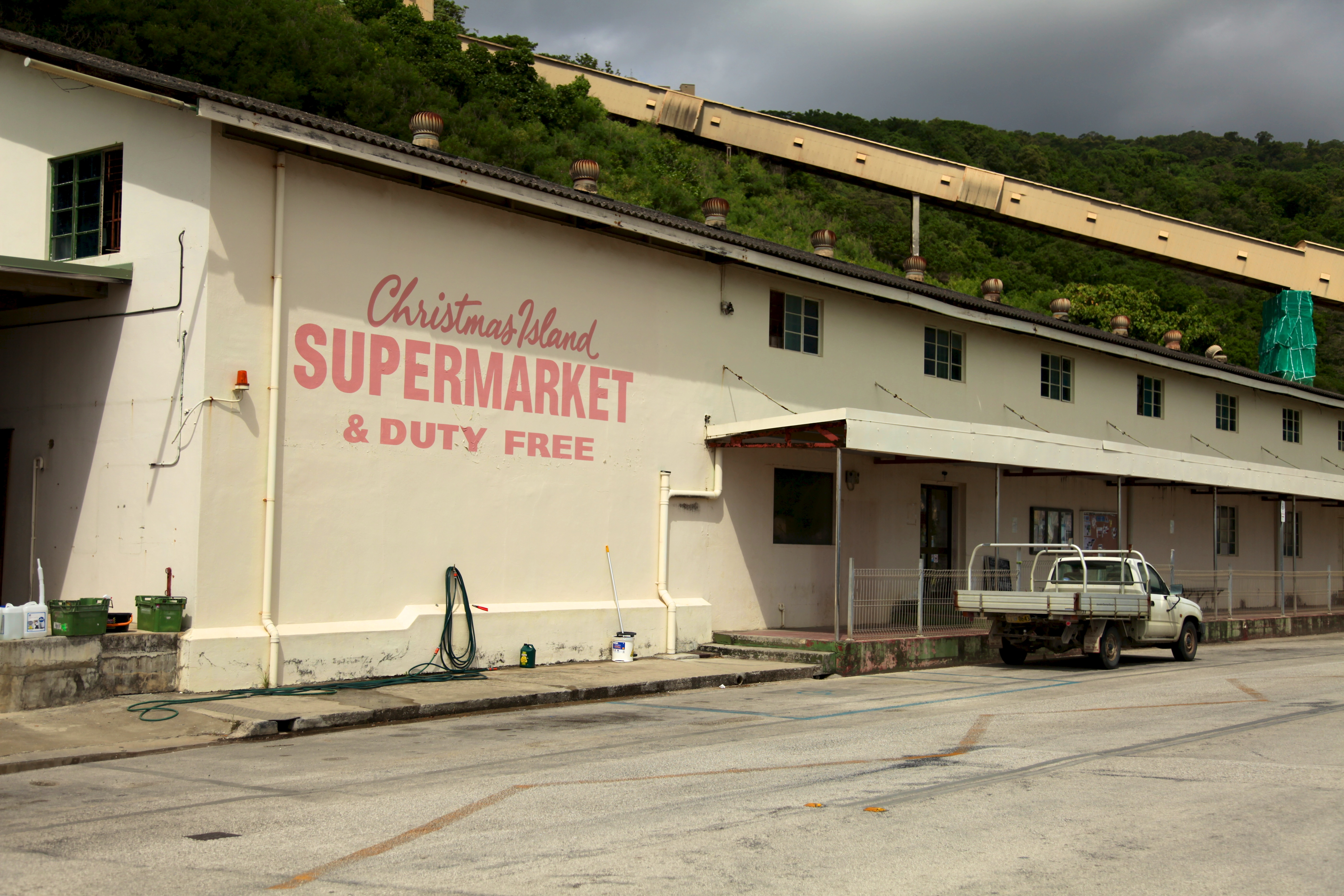
Christmas Island Supermarket; one of the few supplies of fresh produce on the island.

Almost no fresh food is grown on the island due to nematodes in the soil. However, there are three local gardens on the island that cultivate small amounts of Asian greens. These include a community garden at Drumsite, another small community vegetable patch in Poon Saan, and a temple garden, also located in Poon Saan. Notably, these community gardens feature garden beds built up out of the soil to prevent worms from reaching the surface and risking dehydration, thereby preserving the roots of the vegetables. Some of the Asian greens and vegetables grown in these gardens include bok choy, choy sum, kangkong, Chinese mustard, eggplant, and okra, among others.

Locals rely on government-contracted deliveries of fresh food from mainland Australia. As of November 2013, an additional air-freight of vegetables arrives from Malaysia via Indonesia every Friday night for purchase on Saturday morning. This air-freight mainly caters to the tastes of the local community, offering fresh noodles, Asian greens, fish, pork belly, bones and fillets, as well as other packaged foods like fish balls and tofu.

In recent years, the supply of fresh food has been affected by a number of major incidents. In January 2012, the MV Tycoon crashed into the island's main dock at Flying Fish Cove, preventing subsequent fresh-food deliveries from reaching the island. When food supplies by ship are not available, air-freighted deliveries have been known to sell out within hours.

== Wild food ==
Due to the tropical nature of Christmas Island's weather, a wide variety of food grows wild on the island. Fruit trees are found dotted around the island and on private properties. Some of the things that can be found by foraging on Christmas Island include:

- papaya
- mango
- coconut
- pumpkin
- chilli
- jackfruit
- wild lime
- bunga kantan (also known as laksa flower or torch ginger flower - botanical name Etlingera elatior)
- manquang (a Chinese turnip also known as jicama)
- tapioca
- lemongrass
- banana
- guava

Many other well known tropical fruits such as rambutan, lychee and durian do not grow on Christmas Island as there is inadequate soil depth and not enough steady rainfall throughout the year.

== Meals ==
As a result of supply issues, whole fresh produce can be difficult to acquire and so meals that make use of processed foods and canned foods are popular.

Traditionally, chickens were kept on the island and locals produced their own pickled eggs and Chinese century eggs. Dishes that made use of the chickens themselves were popular along with dishes that included local coconut crabs. However, coconut crabs are now a protected species.

The island has a number of noodle bars offering Chinese and Malaysian dishes in accordance with the traditional cuisines of the island's residents.

== See also ==
- Malaysian cuisine
- Australian Chinese cuisine
