= MV Tycoon =

History
- Name: MV Tycoon
- Operator: Ocean Grow International Shipmanagement, Kaohsiung, Taiwan
- Port of registry: Panama
- Builder: Sanyo Shipbuilding, Onomichi, Japan
- Launched: 1983
- Identification: MMSI number: 355335000; IMO number: 8304220; Call sign: 3EVV2
- Fate: Wrecked on 8 January 2012

General characteristics
- Type: Cargo ship
- Tonnage: 2,638 GT
- Length: 84.7 m (278 ft) LOA
- Beam: 14.5 m (48 ft)
- Capacity: 4,129 DWT

MV Tycoon was a cargo ship that was under management by Ocean Grow International Shipmanagement, Kaohsiung, Taiwan. She was wrecked on 8 January 2012 after breaking her moorings and was pushed into the cliffs at Flying Fish Cove, Christmas Island and broke up, spilling oil and phosphate into the sea. All fifteen crew were rescued by Royal Australian Navy RIBs. Built by Sanyo Shipbuilding, Onomichi, Japan and launched in 1983 as Seizan. Tycoon had been known as Sun Rose, Kumiko L., Aki Ace, Galcrest and Euro Coaster during her career.
