= Robert Mascara =

Australian television director

- Born: 6 April 1972 (age 54); Melbourne, Victoria, Australia
- Other name: Belvedere
- Occupations: Production assistant; floor manager; assistant director; television personality
- Known for: Good Morning Australia

Robert "Belvedere" Mascara (born 6 April 1972) is an Australian television floor manager and assistant director.

Of Italian descent, Mascara was born in Melbourne and began his career in December 1989 at the Nine Network where he was working as a production assistant on Carols By Candlelight at the Sidney Myer Music Bowl then in January 1990 moved onto Wide World of Sports. That same month he was offered a full-time position with Network Ten and began working on shows such as Neighbours, The Comedy Company, Blind Date with Greg Evans, Col'n Carpenter and Let the Blood Run Free.

== Good Morning Australia ==
In January 1992 he started working on The Morning Show, which was later renamed Good Morning Australia with Bert Newton (GMA). As well as being the floor manager, host Bert Newton decided to utilise Mascara as his sidekick and "taste-tester" for the recipes made on the show by the guest chefs. Mascara was nicknamed "Belvedere" which was taken from the Warner Brothers Looney Tunes cartoon where there was a lovable character dog named Belvedere. After tasting the dish, he would recite a humorous limerick which was the tag to each cooking segment. His antics generated a cult following and made him a very popular cast member on GMA and he even did weekly public appearances. Mascara also worked on New Faces with Bert which was aired on Ten in 1992–93. Music Director John Foreman also worked on both programs. He also worked on the 1993 Logie Awards which was hosted by Bert. Mascara was the Senior Floor Manager at Ten in Melbourne and worked on various shows for the network. Mascara appeared in Bert's This Is Your Life and Bert's 70th Birthday Surprise Special both for the Nine Network. In July 2017, Studio 10 produced a live GMA tribute show from the original studio in Ten's South Yarra Melbourne studio including some of the cast. Mascara appeared on the show and brought back his popular limerick. He currently works as a freelance floor manager and is an ambassador for the Mirabel Foundation.
