= Susie Elelman =

Australian television presenter

Susie Elelman AM
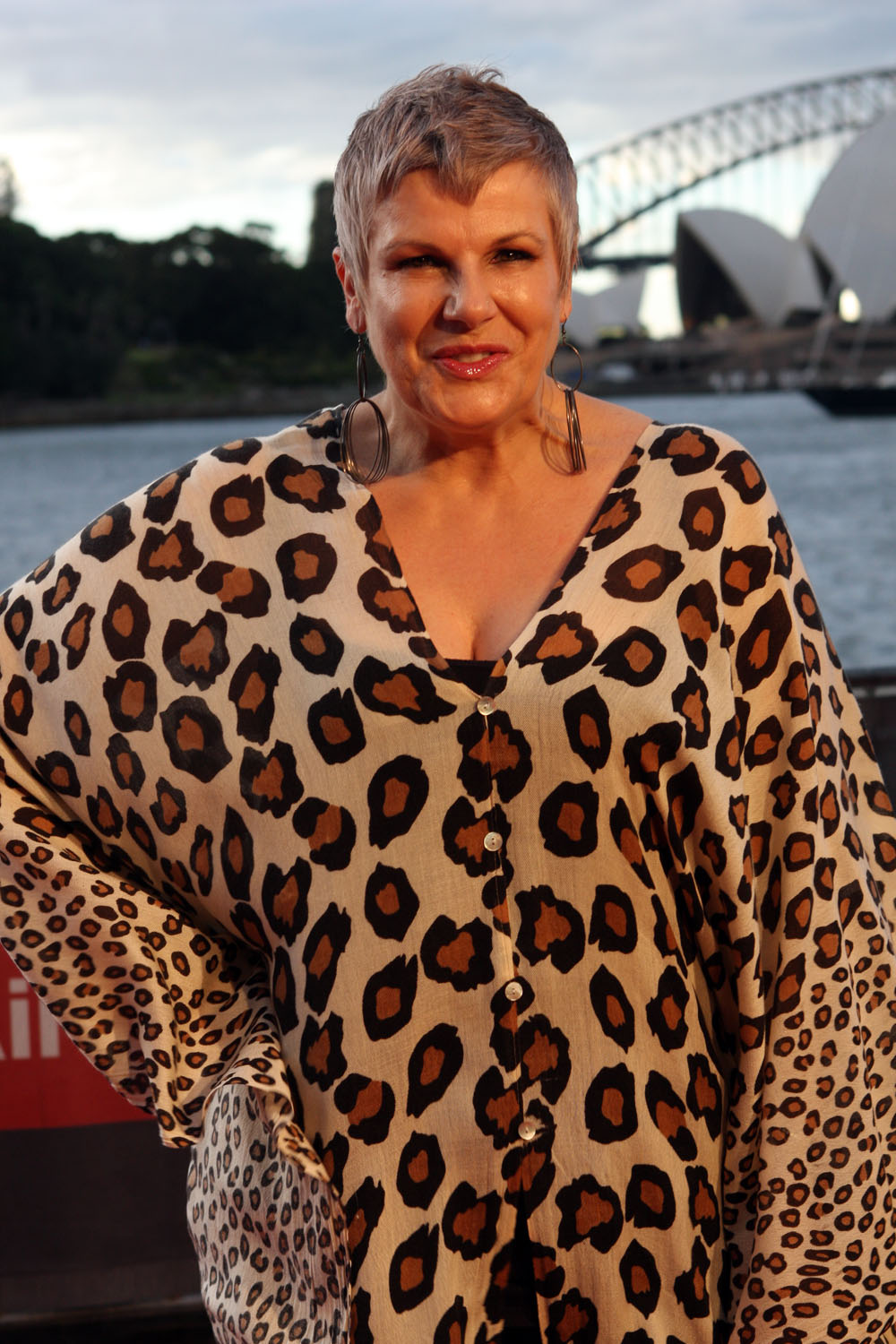
- Susie Elelman (2012)
- Born: Susan Elelman; 25 June 1954 (age 72)
- Occupations: Television presenter; model; author
- Website: http://www.susieelelman.com

Susan Elelman AM (born 25 June 1954) is an Australian television presenter, model, and author, most famous for her appearances on daytime television in Australia. From 2007 to 2008, she hosted her own talk show, titled Susie. She is best known as the advertorial host and roving reporter on Good Morning Australia with Bert Newton, a position she held for eight and a half years.

== Career ==
According to records at the National Museum of Australia, Elelman was a participant in the Miss Northern Beaches and Miss New South Wales beauty competitions, and was in the national final of the Miss Australia Quest of 1973.

From 1992 to mid-1999, Elelman was the roving reporter for Bert Newton and advertorial presenter on Good Morning Australia on Network Ten.

In mid-2007, Elelman hosted her own daily talk show, titled Susie, which was broadcast on the WIN Television network. The network's chief executive at the time, David Butorac, axed the show in 2009. Butorac says that he himself was sacked from the network because of his decision to cancel Elelman's show, which was said to be a favourite of the network's owner, Bruce Gordon.

Elelman has shocked local media with her provocative appearances at the annual television Logie Awards. In 2004 she appeared at the awards with her head shaved.

In 2011, Elelman and entertainer Barry Crocker co-hosted the Australian music industry's annual Mo Awards.

Since 2011, Elelman has appeared in a weekly guest spot on Channel Seven's The Morning Show. In 2015, Elelman was honoured in the annual Queen's Birthday honours, as a Member of the Order of Australia.

Elelman was a fill in presenter for Denise Drysdale on Network 10's morning talk program Studio 10.

== Personal life ==
In May, 2017, Elelman admitted on talk show Studio 10 that she had been sexually assaulted by now disgraced entertainer Rolf Harris. She said on the show "He had this habit of hugging you and then running his hand down your back and trying to insert his finger you know where. And then what you’d do of course ... is flinch and therefore you go closer in towards him which means that your groins would join." Elelman was in her 20s working behind the scenes of a show back in the '70s when the incident happened. She said her experience was "bad enough", but that she was more concerned for a 15-year-old work experience girl there.
