= Moira McLean =

Australian television presenter

- Born: Moira McLean
- Occupation: Television advertorial presenter
- Years active: ca. 1980-2026
- Children: 1
- Website: https://www.moiramclean.com/

Moira McLean is an Australian television presenter, where she is known as an advertorial presenter.

She began her career as a writer with radio station 2UW. 1980 she joined Channel 10, where she trained as copywriter, producer and director. The following year she had her first appearance on screen in a commercial for Waratah Park. In 1983 she got to host the new kids’ tv program The Harry and Ralph Show, a Sunday morning show with a blend of comedy segments, puppets, and cartoons. The show also featured co-hosts, Marty Morton and the well-known entertainment reporter Craig Bennett during his early career. In 1985 this was followed by another kids’ show, Moira’s Morning, which run from 6 am. to 8 am and largely featured cartoons. From 1986 to 1987 she was part of the line-up of reporters of Simon Townsend's Wonder World, a news light programme directed at youths on the weekday afternoon schedule of Channel 10.

From its beginning in 1992 until its end in 2005 McLean could be seen on, often pretaped, advertorials on Good Morning Australia with Bert Newton on Network Ten. McLean was introduced by Newton using the phrase "And now, here's Moira..." or some variation of this.

Around 2005 McLean joined the home shopping channel TVSN, where she remained until they stopped broadcasting on 15 November 2026.
