= Tonia Todman =

Australian television personality (born 1948)

- Born: 1948 (age 76–77)
- Occupation(s): Television personality, author
- Known for: Healthy, Wealthy and Wise, Good Morning Australia

Tonia Todman (born 1948) is an Australian television personality and author, who has appeared on Good Morning Australia, and also appeared on Rove Live. She was also frequently referred to throughout the original season of Rove, with many skits having guests distracted saying "I thought I saw Tonia Todman".

She is known for making craftwork, and is best known for her craft segments on classic Australian lifestyle show Healthy, Wealthy and Wise in the early to mid-'90s. Todman was briefly married to Melbourne lawyer David Stagg, when both of them appeared together on the cover of Women's Weekly. Todman also appears in television advertisements, most recently for Janome sewing machines.
