= San Choy Bow =

Chinese-style lettuce-wrapped dish

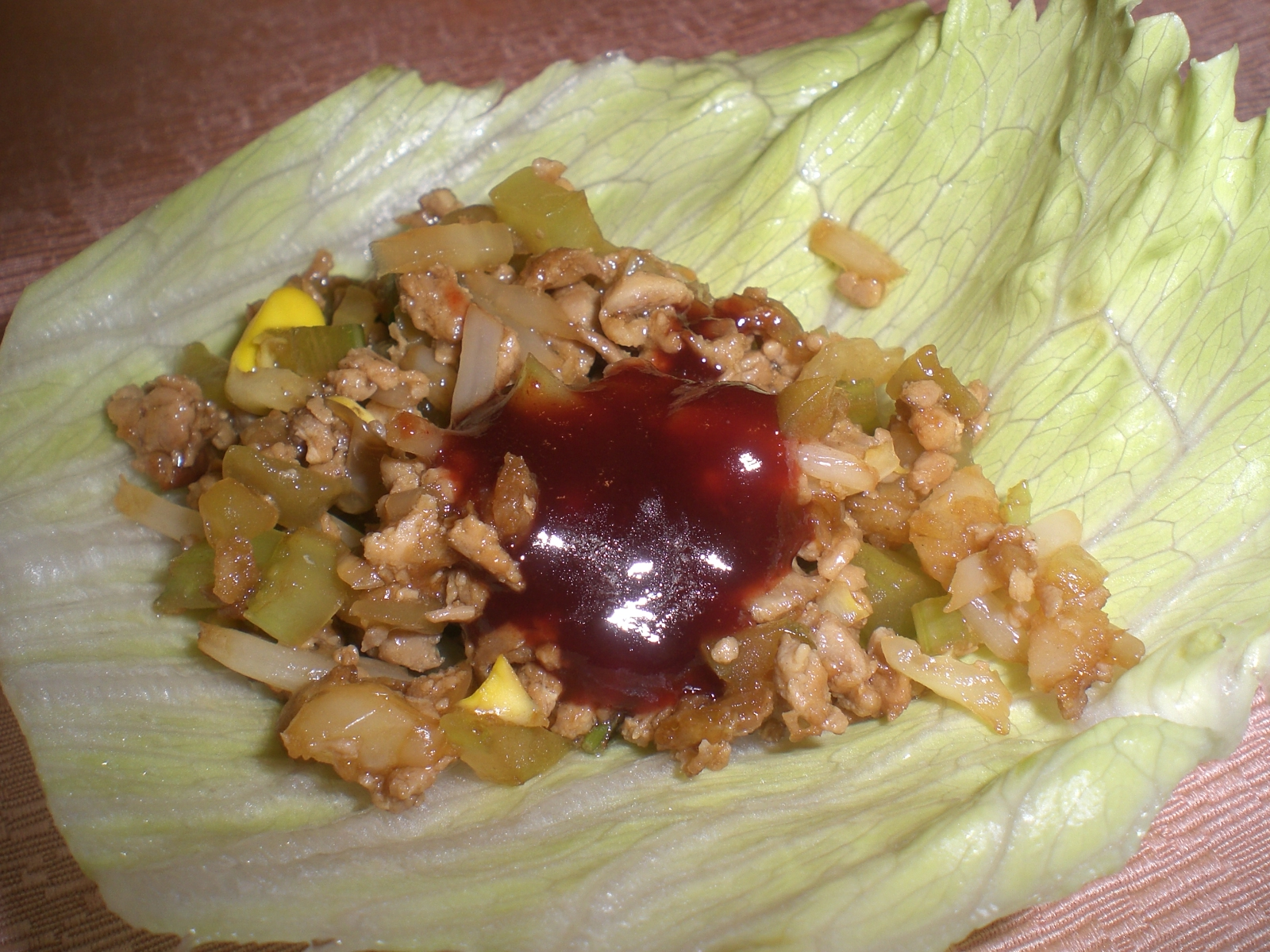
- San Choy Bow served in lettuce cups
- Alternative names: San Choy Bow; San Choi Bao; San Choy Bau; Sang Choy Bao; Lettuce Wraps
- Course: Entrée
- Place of origin: China
- Region or state: Guangdong
- Serving temperature: Warm
- Main ingredients: Minced meat, lettuce, vegetables
- Variations: Vegetarian, vegan, chicken, seafood

Chinese name
- Chinese: 生菜包
- Hanyu Pinyin: shēngcài bāo
- Literal meaning: "lettuce wrap"
Transcriptions
Standard Mandarin
- Hanyu Pinyin: shēngcài bāo
Yue: Cantonese
- Yale Romanization: sāang choy bāau
- Jyutping: saang1 coi3 baau1

San choy bow (Chinese: 生菜包; pinyin: shēngcài bāo; Jyutping: saang1 coi3 baau1; lit. 'lettuce wrap') is a dish consisting of seasoned minced meat encased in a crisp raw lettuce wrap, and typically include vegetables such as chillies, spring onions, coriander, water chestnuts, mushrooms, bamboo shoots, and seasoned with various sauces. It is typically eaten by hand, where one spoons the filling mixture into lettuce leaves immediately before consumption. Vegan variations also exist. The dish originated in Cantonese cuisine and through the Chinese diaspora, was introduced to other countries such as the United States and Australia around the mid-to-late 20th century, where it became part of Westernized adaptations of Chinese cuisine.

== Etymology ==
The name San Choy Bow comes from Cantonese word 生菜包 (jyutping: saang1 coi3 baau1) and literally translates as "wrapped in lettuce".

In Australian English, the anglicized spellings are derived from the Cantonese pronunciation and can vary where besides "San Choy Bow", the name has also been written as Sang Choy Bao, San Choi Bau, San Choi Bao, and San Choy Bau.

In the United States, the dish was widely referred to as "San Choy Bao" in Cantonese restaurants during the 1980s, but the Chinese-American restaurant chain P.F. Chang's popularized the term lettuce wrap for the dish in the 1990s, and this has since become the most mainstream name for Chinese lettuce wraps in the U.S.

== History ==
=== China ===
The dish is a classic Cantonese cuisine that is commonly used in banquet and Chinese new year festivities. In Cantonese, the word for lettuce is a homophone for "growing wealth", and the dish is therefore culturally associated with growth and prosperity. Traditional versions typically use pork, although variations using a range of ingredients exist across China. In some restaurant versions, pigeon meat is also used.

The dish is central to the "Lettuce Festivals" which is a traditional custom with over 400 years of history, popular within Guangzhou, Nanhai, and Shunde areas of Guangdong Province, China. Examples include the Dakengkou area of Fangcun, Guangzhou, which annually hosts a gathering where people eat lettuce wraps commonly with clam meat, lettuce and chives and stir fried with seasoning and placed in a bowl. Eating lettuce wraps while worshipping Guanyin Bodhisattva is a traditional custom that prays for prosperity and good fortune.

Attendees of lettuce festival also enjoy traditional folk songs and performances. During these festivities, a pool filled with snails and clams is set up for women to collect. A local belief is that a woman who finds a snail will give birth to a son, while finding a clam will result in a daughter. After a revival of the custom in the 1980s, some areas changed the lettuce festival's timing to coincide with the Lantern Festival. According to Chinese legend, the 26th day of the first lunar month every year is associated with the deity Guanyin Bodhisattva opening her treasury to lend money, and help make others become wealthy. Devotees will go to Guanyin temples to burn incense and pray to "borrow money" for good fortune. Nowadays, the lettuce festival typically occurs at the same time of this lunar festival.

=== Australia ===
San Choy Bow became an integral part of Australian Chinese cuisine after a Chinese restauranteur, Mathew Chan, had first introduced the dish to Australia in the mid-to-late 20th century. Early restaurant versions of the dish reportedly used pigeon meat, however Chan adapted the recipe at his restaurant in Crows Nest by substituting pork mince, water chestnuts, bamboo shoots and Chinese mushrooms, in order to better suit Australian tastes. Versions of this dish that uses pigeon or duck, have also been featured in high-end Australian food magazines. The dish has since become widely popular in Chinese restaurants across Australia.

=== USA ===
San Choy Bow had become a common dish in Cantonese restaurants in the United States by the 1980s. Cecilia Chang, a pioneer in American Chinese cuisine, had served the dish at her restaurant, The Mandarin, in San Francisco using pigeon meat. Her son, Philip Chiang, who later took over control of the restaurant, continued the recipe but swapped the squab meat with chicken.

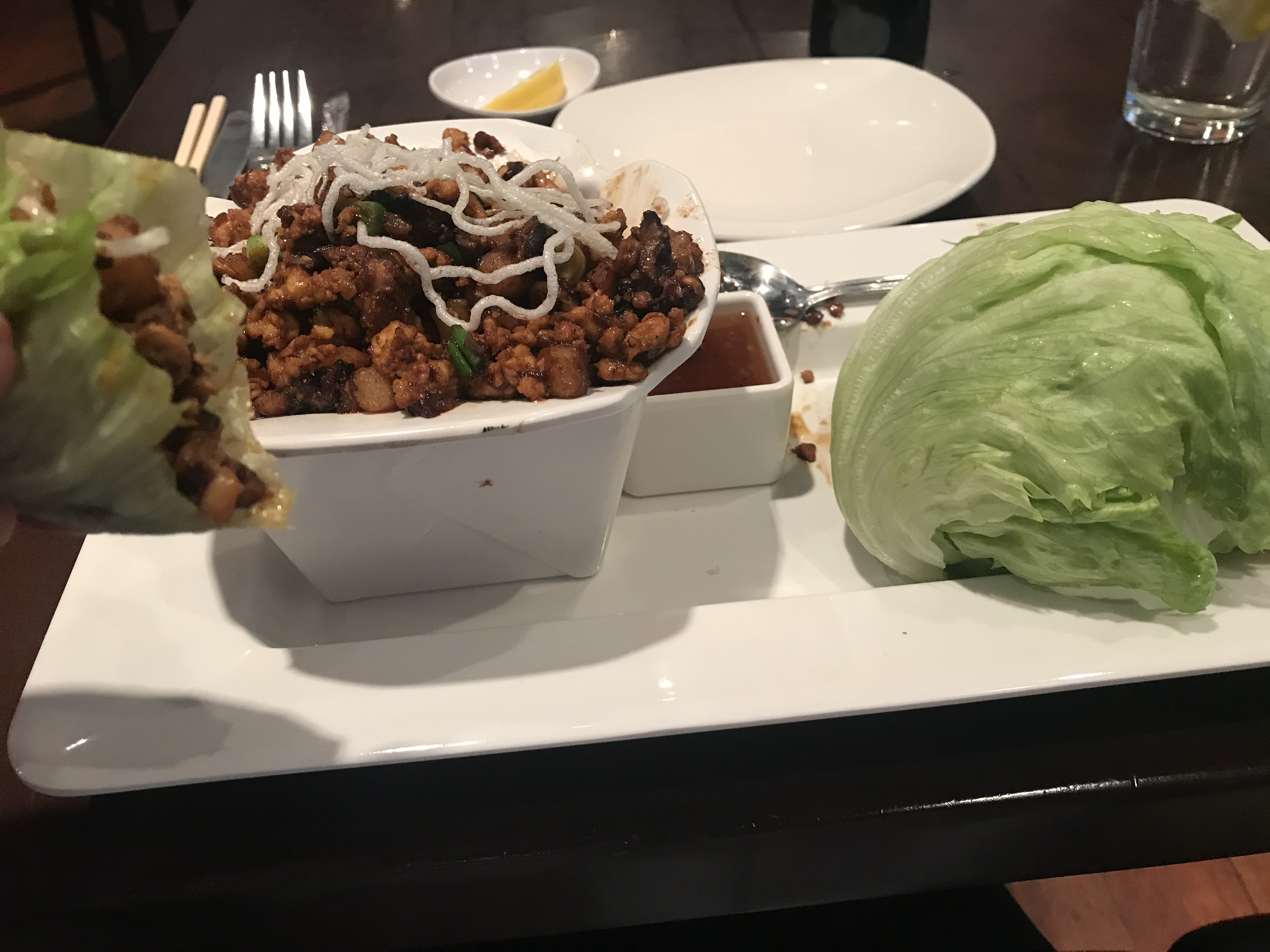
Chicken lettuce wraps served at P.F. Chang's in Tucson, Arizona, a Western-style adaptation of Cantonese lettuce wrap dishes

In 1993, Philip Chiang co-founded P.F. Chang's China Bistro and was serving the dish that was adjusted for American palates, while branding them as P.F. Chang's Chicken Lettuce Wraps. Due to the significant influence of P.F. Chang's in bringing the Cantonese lettuce wraps into mainstream awareness, Americans today commonly refer to the dish simply as "lettuce wraps" in American Chinese cuisine.

== Preparation and Variations ==
There are multiple variations of the recipe, including vegan, gluten-free, and a low FODMAP version. Fillings vary widely and may include pork, beef, chicken, as well as seafood such as salmon, shrimp, or squid. Some modern adaptations also use plant-based alternatives such as tofu or meat substitutes.

Common ingredients typically include minced meat (generally pork), lettuce leaves (traditional uses iceberg lettuce but butter lettuce can be used), water chestnuts, coriander, mushrooms, spring onions, grated ginger and garlic, shaoxing wine, soy sauce, and sesame oil. Additional seasonings may include hoisin sauce or white pepper.

The filling mixture is typically stir-fried and served hot. Diners spoon the mixture into lettuce leaves, which are then wrapped before eating.

== See also ==
- Lettuce sandwich
- Ssam
