= Gabriel Gaté =

French chef and cookbook author

- Born: 1955 (age 70–71); Loire Valley
- Culinary career
- Previous restaurants: Prunier, Paris; The Berkeley Hotel, London; L'Archestrate, Paris
- Television shows: Taste le Tour with Gabriel Gaté; Fun in the Kitchen; The Good Food Show; Kidz in the Kitchen; Masterchef Australia (season 15)
- Award won: La Croix de Chevalier
- Website: http://www.gabrielgate.com

Gabriel Gaté (born 1955 in the Loire Valley) is a French chef and cookbook author living in Australia. He has appeared on a number of Australian television shows. Gabriel was awarded La Croix de Chevalier (Knight's Cross) in L'ordre du mérite agricole (Order of Agricultural Merit) in the year 2000.

== Early life ==
Gabriel was born in the Loire Valley in France in 1955, and lived in Beaupréau in Maine-et-Loire where the family grew their own vegetables and made their own wine. His grandmother taught him to cook. Later he served his chef's apprenticeship under Master Chef, Albert Augereau, at the "Jeanne de Laval" restaurant in western France. Then he worked in Paris at the renowned fish restaurant, Prunier, at The Berkeley a five-star hotel in London and under Alain Senderens at L'Archestrate, a three-star restaurant in Paris.

He met his Australian wife Angie when she was studying French at the Sorbonne and the couple moved to Australia to live in 1977.

== Cookbooks ==
Gabriel has authored 23 cookbooks, all have been national best sellers; several have won international awards and he has total sales of over 1,100,000 copies. His first book was French Cuisine for Australians. His second, Family Food, was published by Anne O'Donovan in association with the Anti-Cancer Council, as were his next two books, Smart Food and Good Food Fast. The three books have together sold 500,000 copies.

The three following cookbooks - Favourite Fast Recipes, Television Recipes and Great Cakes and Desserts - have brought his sales over 700,000.

== Life in Australia ==
Gaté came to Australia in 1977 with his Melbourne-born wife, and has since established himself as a popular chef in Melbourne and a leading influence on the way Australians cook today.

As a modern cookery show presenter, Gabriel's credits include:

- Fun in the Kitchen (Seven Network)
- The Good Food Show (ABC)
- What's Cooking (Nine Network)

He has presented cookery segments on many lifestyle programs including Taste Le Tour (SBS Television, as part of the coverage of the Tour de France), Good Morning Australia with Bert Newton (10 Network, Everybody (ABC Television) and Body and Soul (Nine Network). Gabriel won a World Food Media Silver Award in Adelaide in 1999 for best Cooking Segment within a Television Show. He also taught children how to cook in a Channel 31/Digital 44 Melbourne and Geelong (C31 Melbourne) show called Kidz in the Kitchen.

== Awards ==
Since 2001 Gaté has been selected each year by the Victorian Premier's Department as an Ambassador for the Australia Day celebrations.

On 14 July 2000 (Bastille Day) Gaté was presented with one of France's highest honours, La Croix de Chevalier dans L'Ordre du Merite Agricole, for his contribution to promoting French gastronomy.

In 1988 Gaté hosted the CSIRO-produced cooking series The Good Food Show which screened on the ABC.

== See also ==
- French Australians
