= Ssam =

Korean-style food wrap

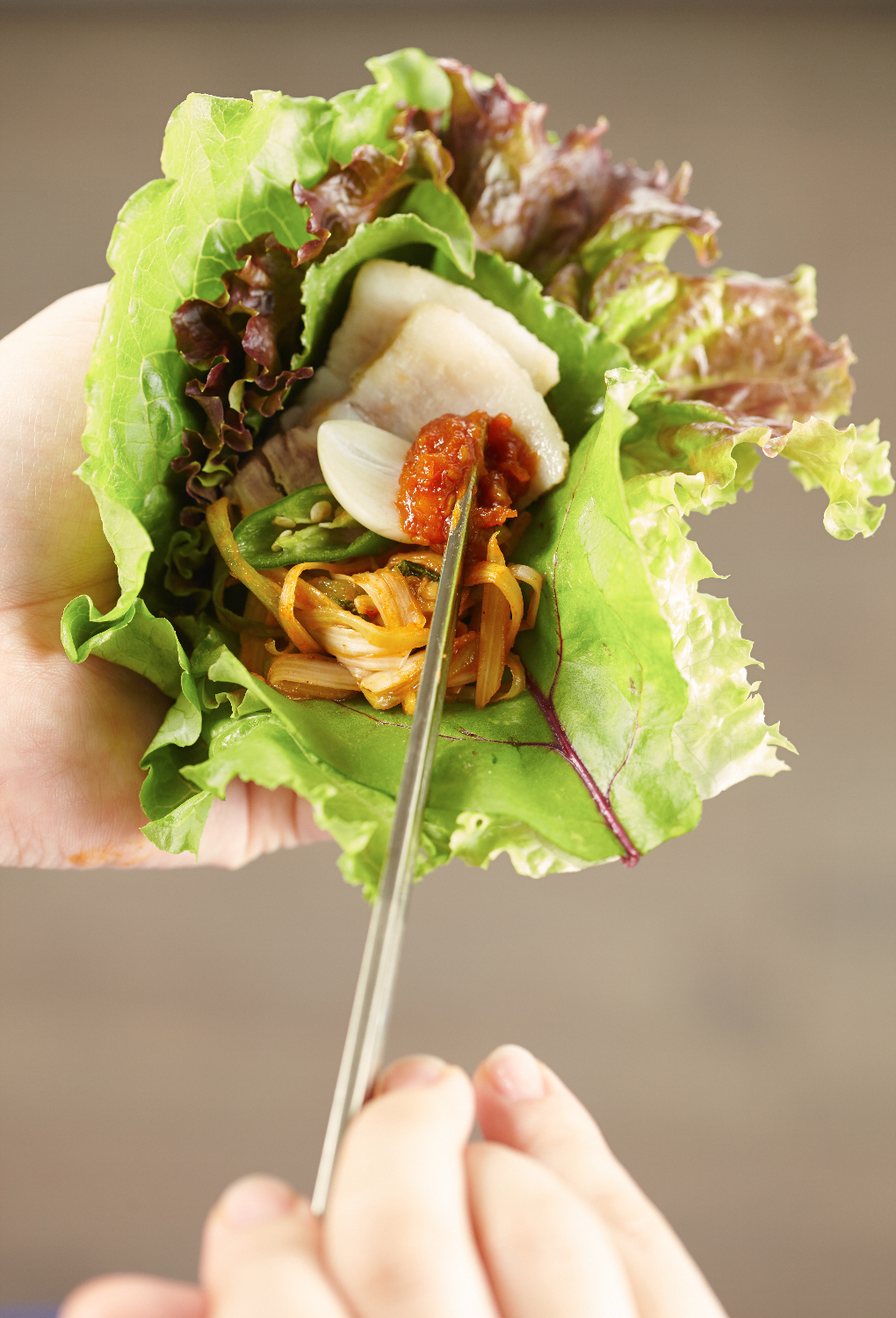
- A ssam consisting of meat, various banchan, and ssamjang

Korean name
- Hangul: 쌈
- RR: ssam
- MR: ssam

Ssam (Korean: 쌈; lit. 'wrapped') are dishes in Korean cuisine where one food is wrapped in another. A common variety is meat such as pork wrapped in a leafy vegetable. It is often accompanied by the condiment ssamjang and can also be topped with raw or cooked garlic, onion, green pepper, or a banchan (small side dish) such as kimchi. Ssam is usually bite-sized to prevent spilling of the fillings.

== History ==
During the Goryeo period (918–1392), the state's Buddhist practices highly discouraged killing and eating animals. This has led to the development numerous Korean vegetable dishes, especially ssam. Yuan poet Yang Yunfu wrote about ssam during the Goryeo period in a poem. Yang wrote that Goryeo people ate rice by wrapping it with raw vegetables, and complimented the pleasant scent of Goryeo's lettuce.

The ancient Korean book of customs Tongguksesigi noted that women of Goryeo who were taken as servants by the Yuan dynasty made and ate ssam to have the taste of their home country's food and soothe homesickness. The same book also noted that ssam had become an established seasonal dish by the Joseon era, which was especially eaten as a festive dish during the day of Daeboreum. The ssam eaten during Daeboreum was believed to bring a good fortune and called bokssam (복쌈), which meant "fortune ssam".

Ssam was mentioned by the many texts in the Joseon era. One of them is Ŏu yadam, a collection of stories written by the scholar Yu Mongin, who recounts wrapping a sardine in a leafy vegetable with rice and ssamjang. In Sasojŏl (사소절; 士小節), a Joseon etiquette book, Yi Tŏngmu said it is polite to scoop and roll a ball of rice first before wrapping it with a vegetable from atop while eating ssam. He also told readers to wrap a ssam in a bitable size as it looked rude to puff one's cheeks while eating. Joseon scholar-official Chŏng Yagyong wrote a poem describing eating ssam consisting of gochujang (Korean chili paste) and the root of green onion in lettuce.

In modern days, ssam is slowly gaining popularity outside of Korea and is being served at restaurants in various locations such as New York City, Tokyo and Brisbane.

== Variations ==
Various vegetables are used as ingredients such as lettuce, cabbage, bean leaves, and pumpkin leaves, which are used either raw or blanched. Seaweed such as miyeok (미역) (sea mustard seaweed) and gim (dried laver) are also used. Ssam can be used to refer to dishes using beef tongue, roe, pork, clams, or sea cucumbers wrapped and cooked in eggs. Depending on one's taste, ssam can contain side dishes such as kimchi (김치) and garlic, and sauce such as ssamjang (쌈장), doenjang (된장), red pepper paste (고추장), and oil sauce. Sashimi and gwamegi (과메기) are also eaten with wraps.

=== By ingredients ===
- Bossam: with steamed pork, e.g. shoulder and is a popular dish throughout Korea.
- Ssambap is a dish in which rice is included.

=== By wrap type ===
Specific types:

- Baechu ssam (배추쌈), wrapped with napa cabbage leaf
- Chwi ssam (취쌈), wrapped with chwinamul
- Eossam (어쌈), wrapped with thin fish filet
- Gimssam (김쌈), wrapped with gim, seaweed
- Gotgam ssam (곶감쌈), walnuts wrapped with dried persimmon
- Hobakip ssam (호박잎쌈), wrapped with pumpkin leaf
- Jeonbok ssam (전복쌈), wrapped with sliced and soaked dried abalone
- Kimchi ssam (김치쌈), wrapped with kimchi
- Kkaenip ssam (깻잎쌈), wrapped with perilla leaf
- Milssam (밀쌈), wrapped with a thin crepe made from wheat flour
- Muneo ssam (문어쌈), wrapped with sliced octopus
- Po'ssam (포쌈), wrapped with seasoned raw beef
- Sangchu ssam (상추쌈), wrapped with lettuce

== Gallery ==
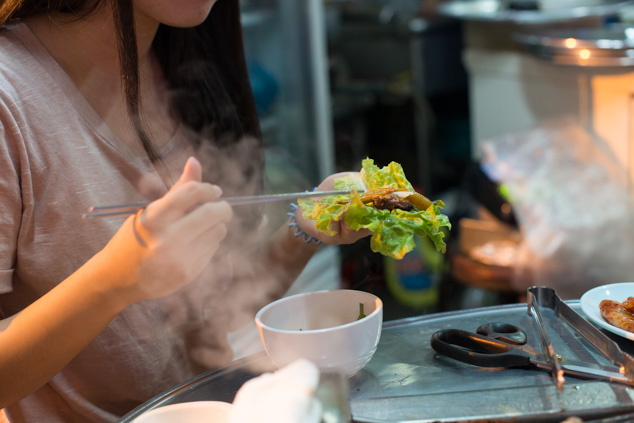
Making ssam

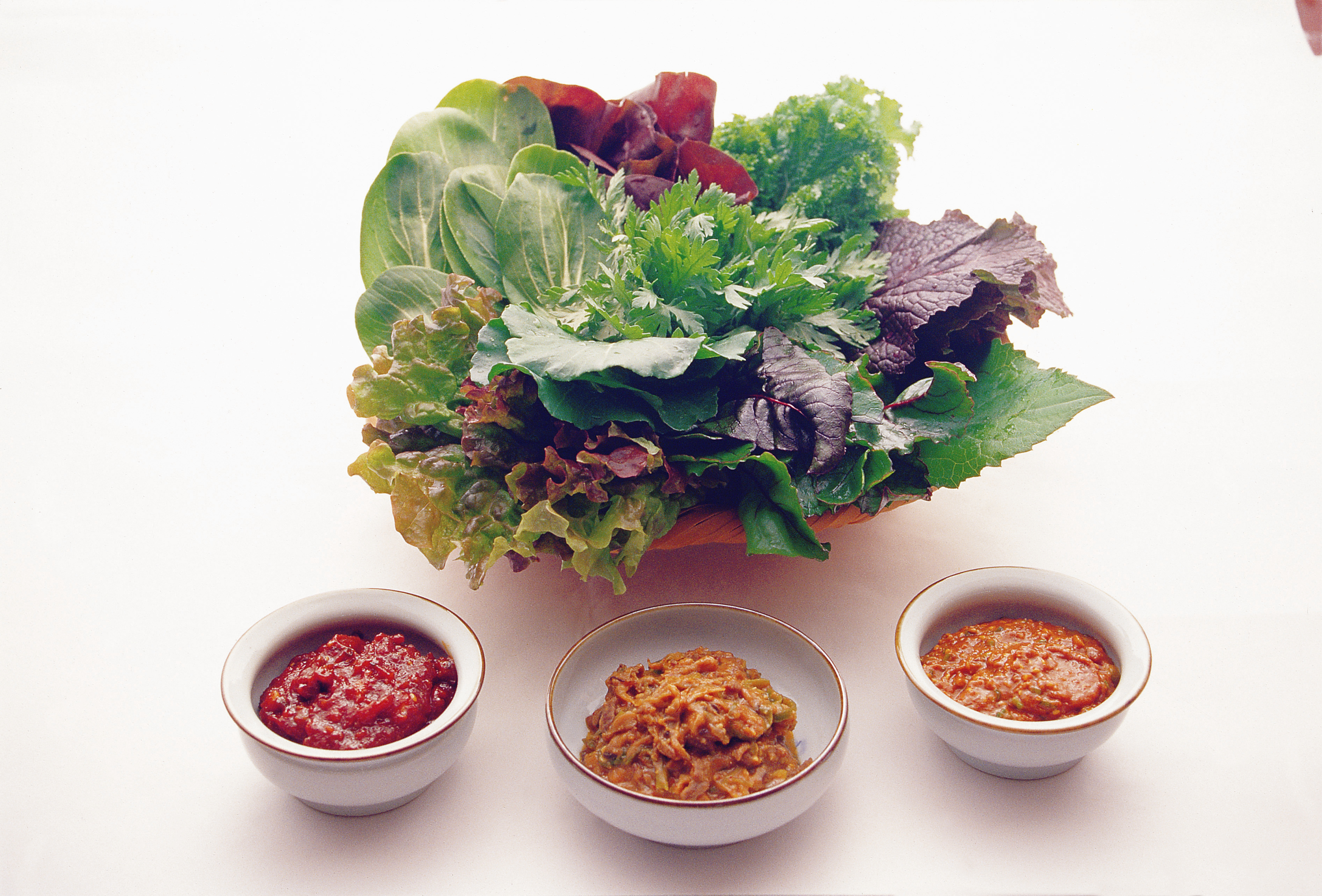
Ssam vegetables and ssamjang

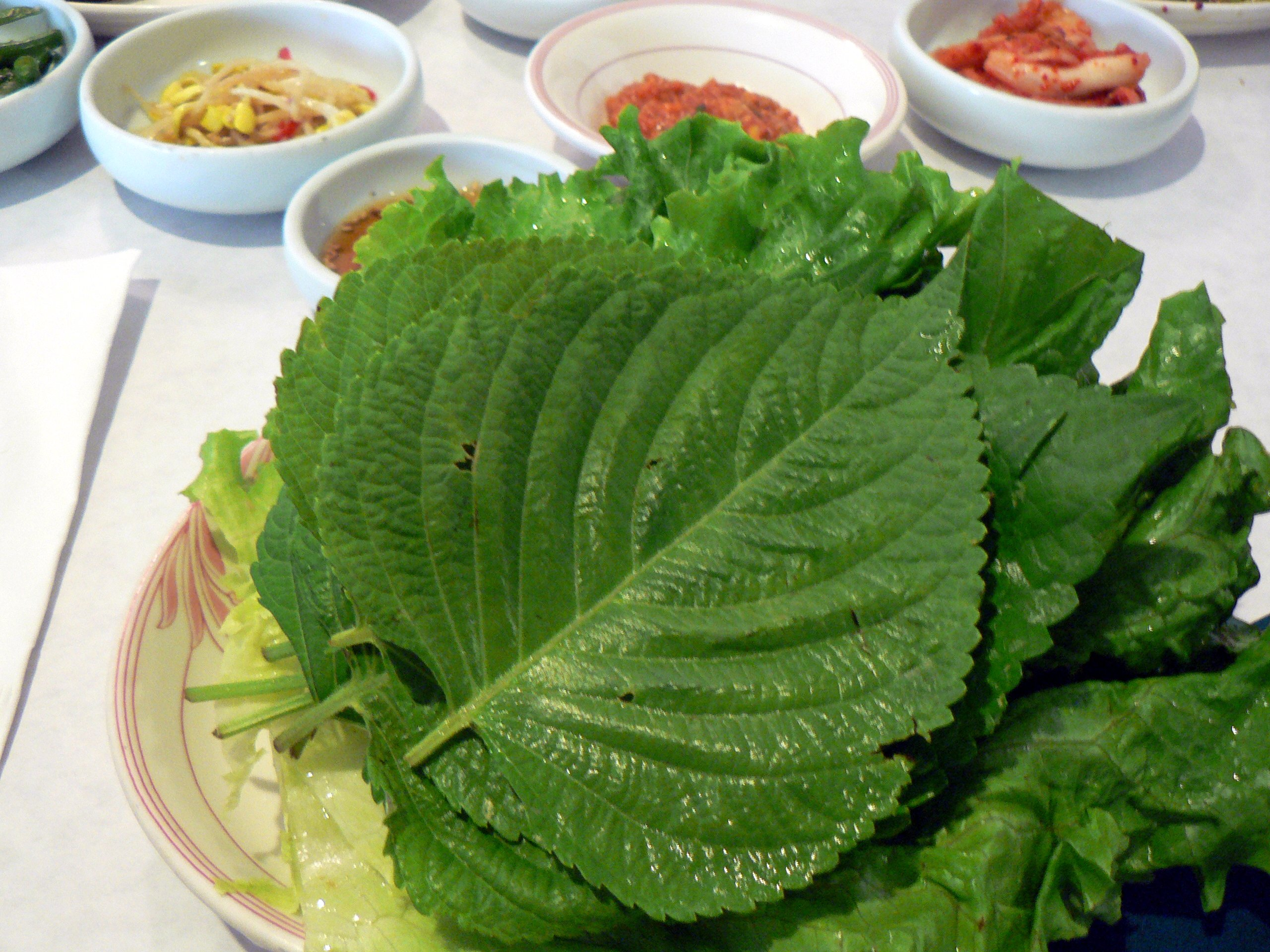
Leaves used for wrapping in ssam dishes

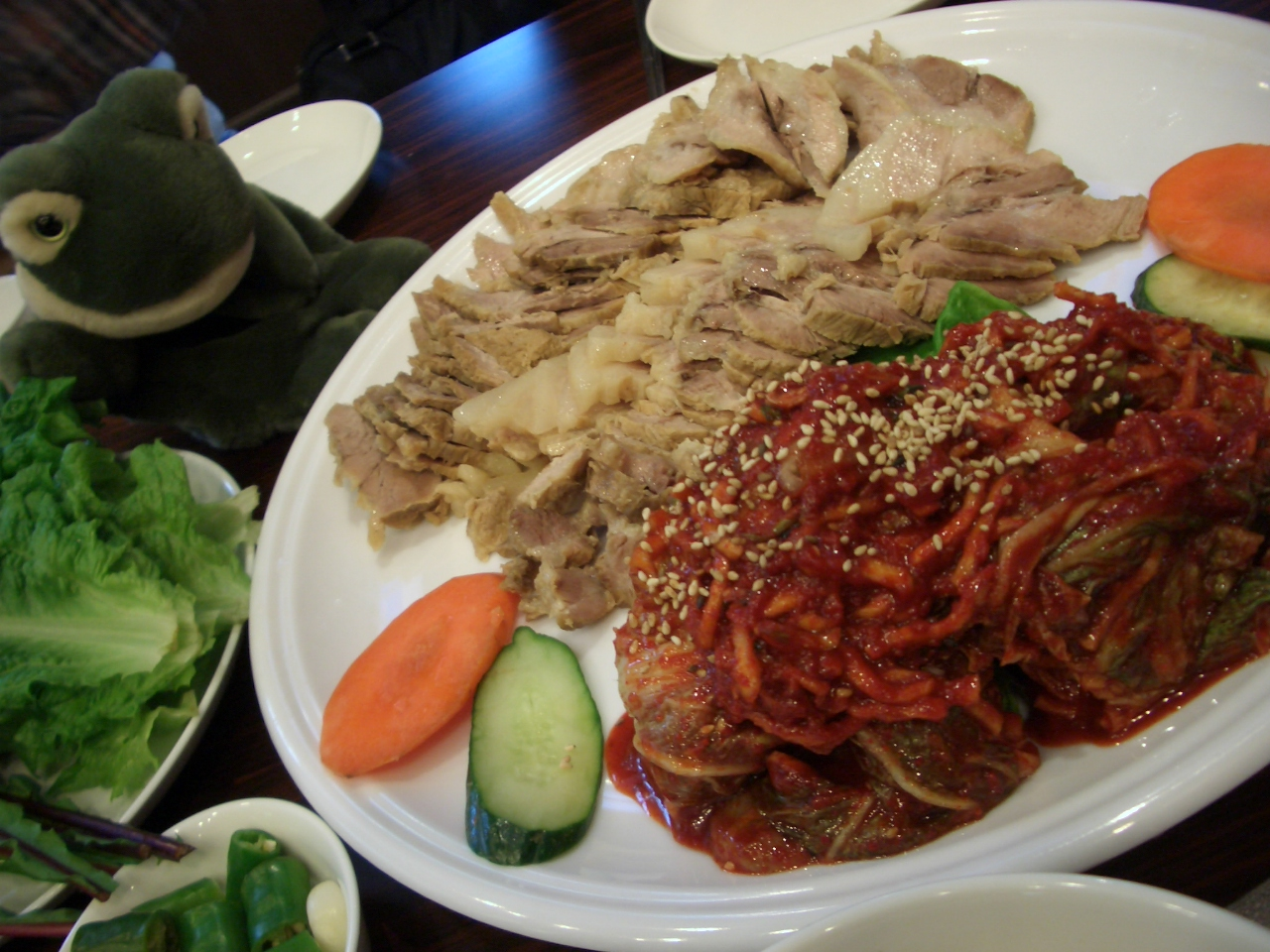
Bossam dish from Gwangju

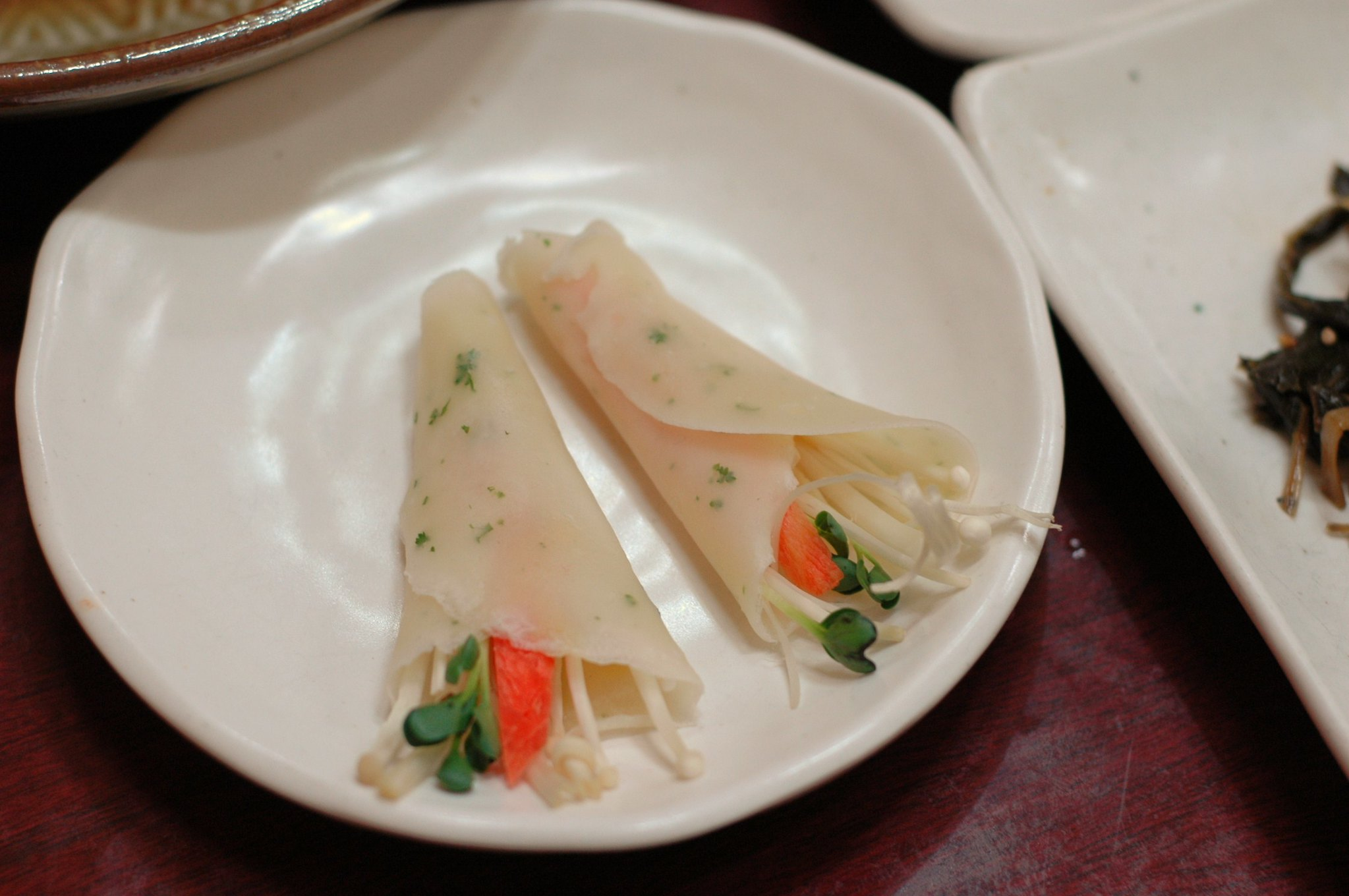
Milssam, wrap with thin pancakes

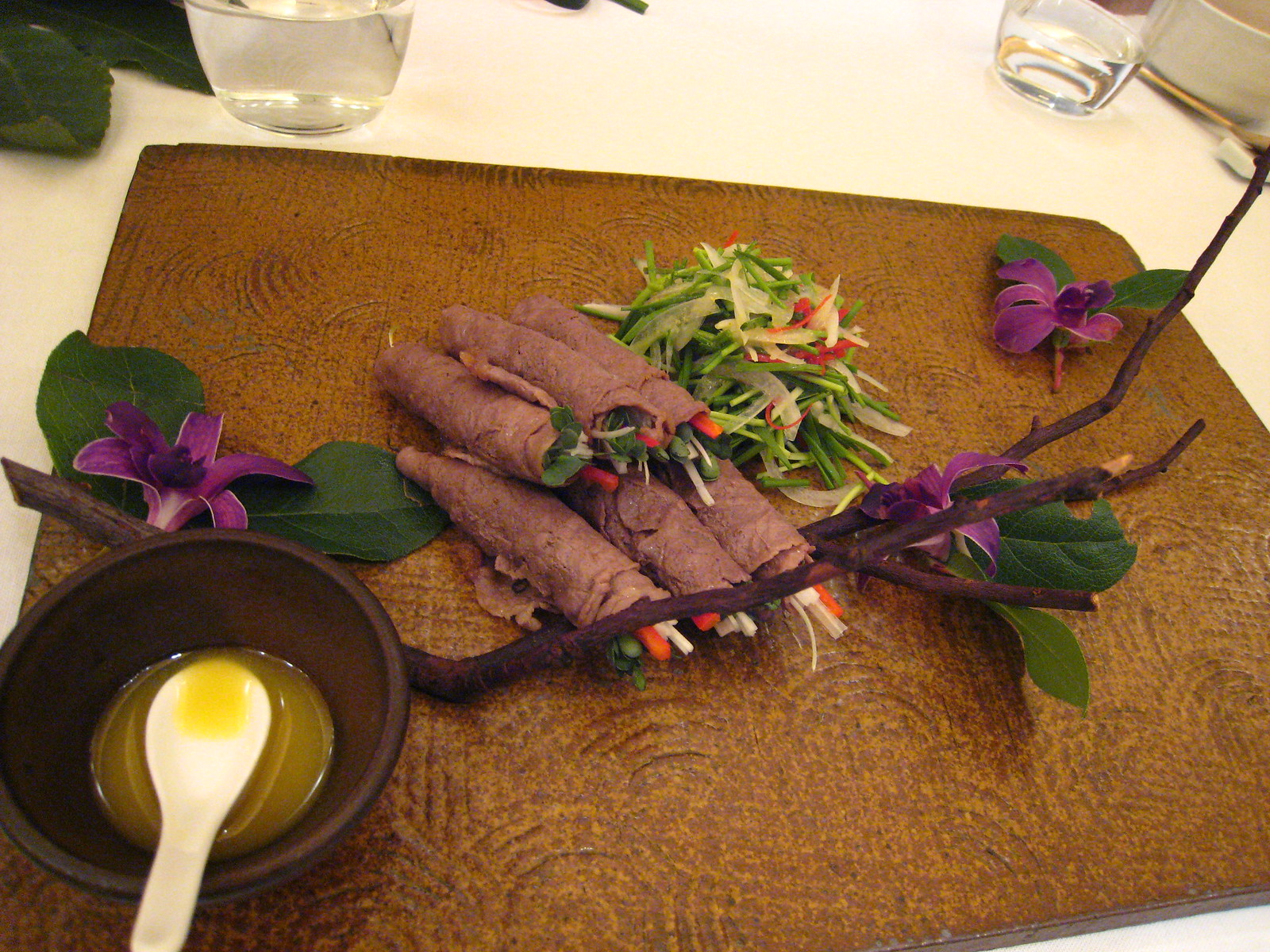
Roseupyeonchae (로스편채), vegetables wrapped in roasted beef slices

== See also ==
- Sandwich wrap
- Món cuốn
- Korean cuisine
- Korean taco
- San Choy Bow
