= Australian Chinese cuisine =

Chinese food in Australia

Australian Chinese cuisine is a style of cooking developed by Australians of Chinese descent, who adapted dishes to satisfy local Anglo-Celtic tastes. Its roots can be traced to indentured Chinese who were brought to work as cooks in country pubs and sheep stations.

Migrant numbers exploded with the gold rushes of the 19th century. By 1890, a third of all cooks were Chinese. Historians believe exemptions for Chinese chefs under the White Australia policy led to the eventual spread of Chinese restaurants across suburbs and country towns.

Most early Chinese migrants were from Guangdong province, and so Cantonese cuisine became the chief influence, using locally available vegetables and more meat than was usual in traditional recipes. Later Chinese immigration, as well as increasingly adventurous domestic palates, have led to restaurants with more authentic dishes from a wider selection of provinces.

== History ==
Not until the Australian Gold Rushes did many Chinese immigrants move to the country. The gold rushes drew thousands of Chinese people, mostly from villages in Southern China – especially the Pearl River delta. In 1855, there were 11,493 Chinese arrivals in Melbourne, Victoria.

As gold was rare, and mining always a dangerous job, Chinese people started to do different jobs to earn a living. Many chose to open small grocery stores or fruit and vegetable-hawking businesses, enter the fishing and fish curing industry, or become market gardeners. Other Chinese immigrants decided to open restaurants that served traditional dishes.

Perhaps because the White Australia policy had an exemption for chefs, many Chinese immigrants and their families became chefs in Australia. By 1890, it was said that 33% of all the cooks in Australia were Chinese. Over time, these Chinese communities grew and established Chinatowns in several major cities around Australia, including Sydney (Chinatown, Sydney), Melbourne (Chinatown, Melbourne) and Brisbane (Chinatown, Brisbane) and as well as regional towns associated with the goldfields such as Cairns Chinatown.

== Chinese cuisine in Australia ==
Australian Chinese cuisine cooking styles were derived from the cooking styles of provinces such as Sichuan and Guangdong. Therefore, Chinese cuisine in Australia from the beginning were usually hot, spicy and numbing (Sichuan cuisine); and/or sweet and sour (Guangdong cuisine). During the first Gold Rush period, Chinese labourers were found working their second job at small food stores which were referred to as "cookhouses" to serve their own people. However, at this time, there was little access to traditional ingredients, especially vegetables such as bok choy and choy sum. As a result, after the White Australia policy was revoked, many Chinese migrants brought seeds from China and started to grow their own vegetables at home to increase the variety in Australia.

Chinese food has been named as Australia's favourite cuisine according to Roy Morgan Research. However, despite its popularity, Australian Chinese cuisine still contains differences from cuisines in China. One of the reason for this is due to the conflicts between Australian and Chinese people. In order for Chinese restaurants to survive, Chinese chefs were expected to provide food that would not directly compete with that of white establishments, but would still suit Western tastes. As a result, many Australian Chinese restaurants have adjusted their food to better adapt to Australians' appetites. For instance, traditional cuisines of China consider vegetables a main dish, while Westerners primarily treat vegetables as side dishes. To better suit local diners, Chinese restaurants offer more meat options on the menus.

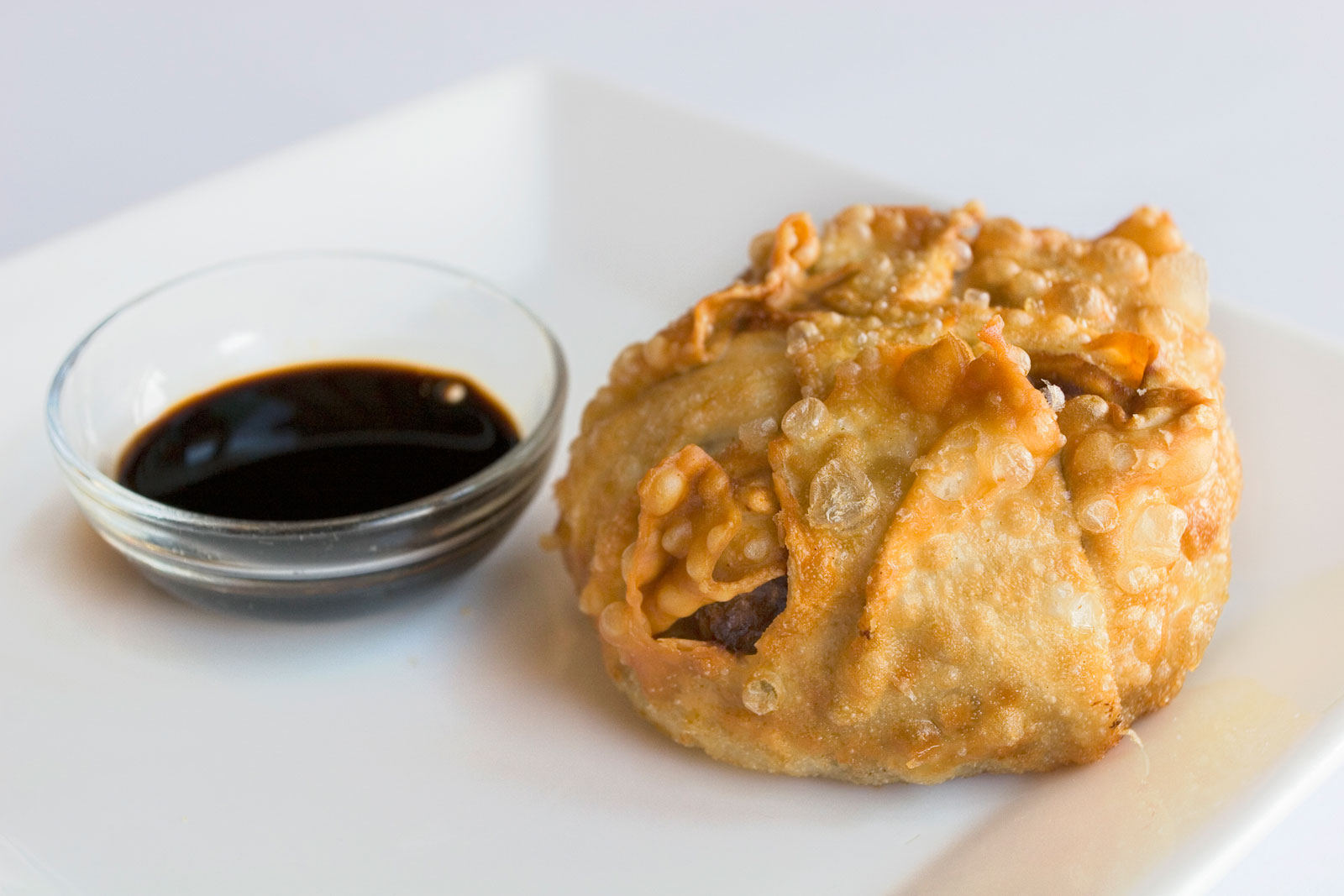
A fried dim sim with soy sauce

Moreover, as Guangdong's cooking styles focus on producing a fresh and tender taste, their cooking methods usually favor steaming and braising. However, to better adapt to the Australian palate, deep-fried and saucy Asian dishes are also included in the new menus. These include sweet and sour pork, sticky lemon chicken and dim sim. Inspired by the authentic Chinese style of dishes, dim sum, the dim sim or "dimmy" was developed by Chinese chef William Wing Young around 1945 in Melbourne. Dim sim is a dumpling with thick (crispy) skin filled with meat and is usually fried. It is normally mistaken for dim sum – small bite-sized portions of food served in small baskets which are usually cooked by the steaming method.

Another example showing the adaptation of Chinese cuisine can be seen through how Matthew Chan has developed Peacock Gardens Restaurant in the Sydney suburb of Crows Nest into the symbol of modern Australian Chinese cuisine. In an interview with News.com.au, Chan said that in the 1970s, Australian customers were not yet familiar with dishes such as "chicken chop suey, san choy bow and beef and black bean". Chan introduced these dishes into Australia with a few Western twists. For example, with san choy bow, understanding that Australian people were not familiar with pigeon meat, Chan decided to change the main protein to pork and beef mince. Furthermore, many vegetables were also substituted: cabbage to celery; bamboo shoots to water chestnuts; and most notably the use of Western broccoli instead of Chinese broccoli.

Furthermore, as the popularity of Chinese cuisine has increased steadily in Australia for the past century, once-unheard-of Chinese ingredients are now appearing in Australian kitchens more regularly. For instance, tofu – a dish that was not accepted in Australia – is now the main ingredient in many dishes. Tofu was discovered over 2000 years ago by the action of curdling soymilk and pressing the curds into blocks with different textures such as soft, firm and extra-firm. A well-known tofu dish normally served in Chinese restaurants around the country is mapo tofu.

However, some Australian Chinese dishes are actually inspired by Western cuisine, including wasabi prawns. The dish was developed by Chan during a business trip to America: "I got the idea from the Hilton's San Francisco Grill where they had mustard on roast beef. I tried to do mustard steak but it didn't work, so I tried it with prawns." In this dish, the prawns are coated with tangy and creamy English mustard and are served with a side of deep-fried spinach leaves sprinkled with sugar to balance the mustard's sharp and strong flavours.

In short, most Chinese restaurants in Australia are designed to be able to cater both Chinese and non-Chinese customers. That being said, there are many items on the menu such as chicken liver, ox tongue, pig uteri and other dishes that can 'frighten' Western customers. Furthermore, due to the growing population of Chinese people in Australia, there are more and more Australian Chinese restaurants serving highly authentic tastes, and there is a wider variety of types of Chinese restaurants. This has included a significant boom in Hong Kong(/Macau)-style cafes, often serving mixed Cantonese-western dishes with Hong Kong-style coffee or tea. Taiwanese restaurants have also significantly increased, especially in the major cities.

== Restaurants ==
Due to significant popularity, Chinese restaurants can be found in most suburbs and cities of Australia. However, the most concentrated locations of Chinese restaurants in Australia are identified as Chinatowns. Here, the dishes are normally prepared to cater for recent Asian immigrants and tourists, as well as Western people with a larger variety of cuisine, including Anhui, Cantonese, Fujian, Shandong, Sichuan and others.

Chinese restaurants also serve food at different price points, as well as serving both traditional and modern Chinese food. For instance, Chinese restaurants located in food courts normally provide food for customers with shoestring budgets. For instance, in Haymarket, Sydney, inside Dixon House, there are many Chinese food stalls that serve affordable Chinese meals. Dixon House, opened in 1982, is one of the most well-known Chinatown food courts. According to Thang Ngo, "[Dixon House] is still the most Chinese of the Chinatown food courts". The place now boasts restaurants such as Oriental Dumpling King and Sizzling and Hot Pot Kitchen, where customers can find meals that range from AU$10 to AU$20.

On the other hand, Chinese restaurants can also be very expensive. The Golden Century Seafood Restaurant, located in Sydney Chinatown, has become the symbol of Chinese luxurious dining. The restaurant was established in 1989 and is known for their 'from tank to plate' serving style. This serving style, according to presenter Gus Worland, has provided an assurance for the freshness of the ingredients. Signature dishes such as Braised Lobster with Ginger and Shallot as well as Braised Whole Abalone with Oyster Sauce can cost customers around AU$300. Moreover, The Golden Century Seafood Restaurant has become famous for hosting royalty, politicians and celebrities. For instance, former United States president, George W. Bush has been spotted eating Peking duck, and well-known celebrities such as Rihanna and Lady Gaga have also been seen enjoying seafood at the restaurant.

Australia also contains authentic restaurants which serve traditional styles, as well as restaurants that serve contemporary Chinese cuisine. Authentic Chinese cuisine can be found in Supper Inn Chinese Restaurant. Supper Inn was established in the 1980s; the restaurant is located in the central business district of Melbourne. Supper Inn's signature dishes include chicken congee and barbecue suckling pig, dishes that have existed in China for thousands of years. Moreover, the restaurant is also famous for its late-night food.

On the contrary, there are also restaurants which combine the authentic tastes of Chinese cuisine with other cuisines around the world to create their own version of contemporary Chinese food. Mr Wong is an example of this. The restaurant was co-created by Dan Hong and Michael Lou. Mr Wong is described by Sydney Morning Herald as a "self-contained Chinatown in the middle of Sydney". The restaurant offers a customised menu featuring many foreign ingredients, which has changed Australians' perspective on Chinese cuisine. Indeed, xiaolongbao, a type of Chinese steamed bun which usually has a minced pork filling, has now been replaced by lobster and scallop. Furthermore, Mr Wong also offers a modern drinks menu with cocktails and house-made ginger beer, suggesting its effort to change customers' views on Chinese cuisine.

== Dishes ==
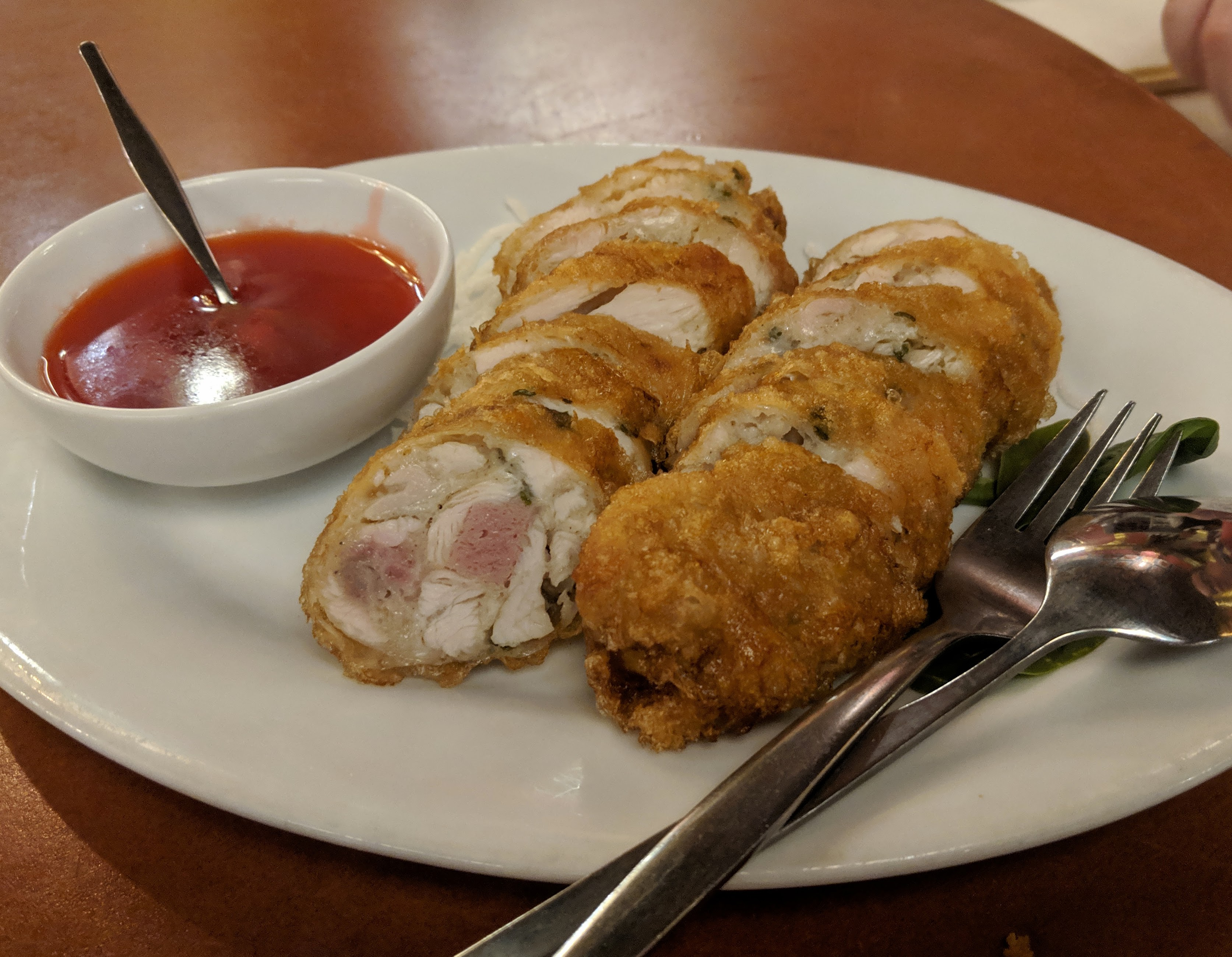
Ham and chicken roll served in Sydney

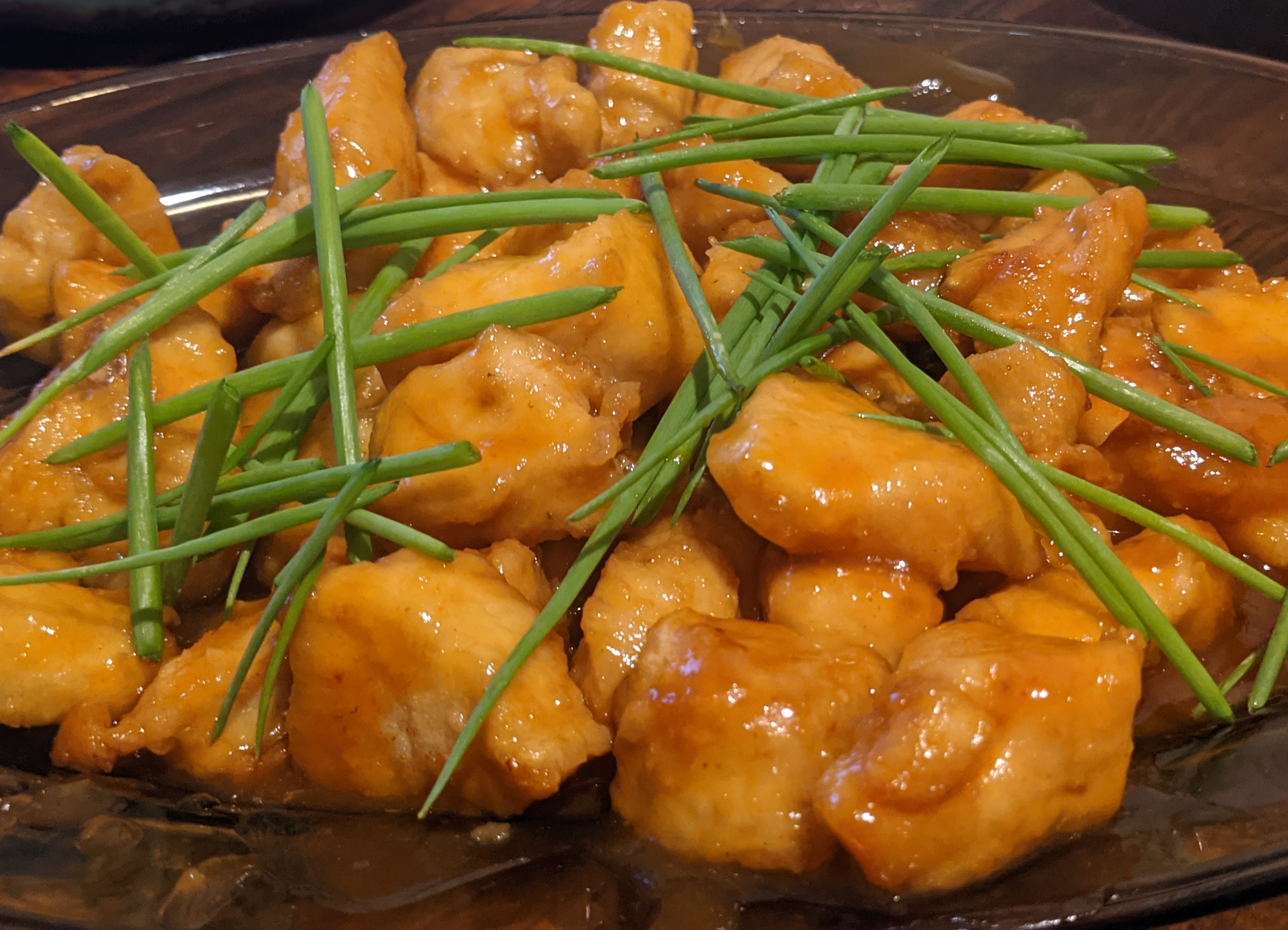
Honey chilli chicken

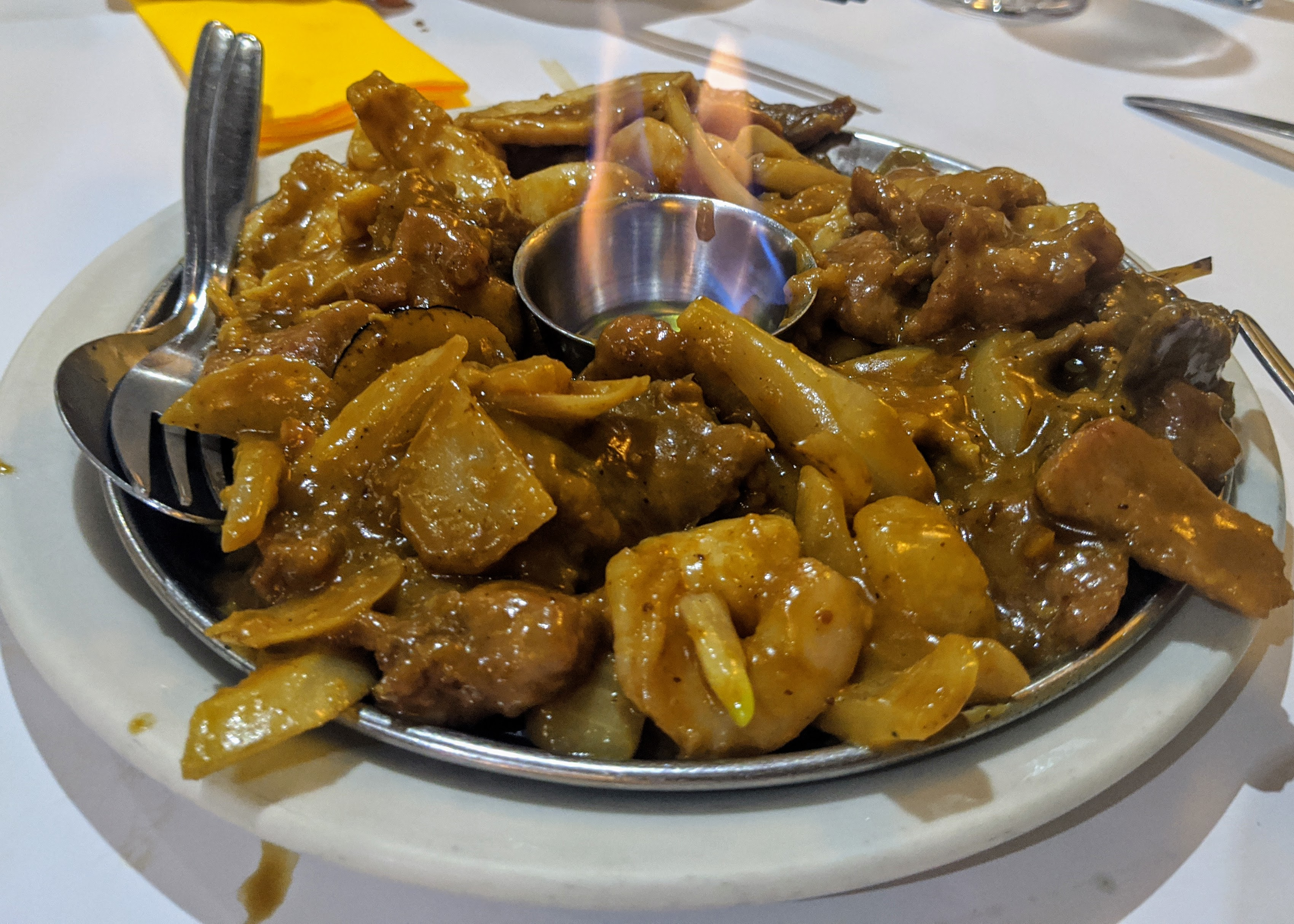
Satay combination

Chinese dishes that have been adapted to Australian tastes include:

- Lemon chicken consists of pieces of chicken meat that are normally deep-fried and coated with a sticky, sweet and sour lemon-flavoured sauce. Despite its lack of resemblance to authentic Chinese cuisine found in China, lemon chicken is very popular in Australian Chinese restaurants.
- San Choy Bow (literally translates as "wrapped in lettuce") is a well-known Chinese dish, which typically is minced meat, traditionally pork, encased in a lettuce wrap. It usually includes vegetable fillings like spring onion, coriander, water chestnuts, mushrooms, and flavoured with soy sauce, sesame oil and other seasonings. Gluten free and vegan versions also exist. The dish was first introduced to Australia by a restauranteur, Mathew Chan, who had adapted the dish for the Australian palate. According to The Guardian, high-end food magazines had featured the recipe using ingredients like duck and pigeons, instead of the traditional pork. SCMP noted that restaurant versions often used pigeon.
- Chow sam see is a dish invented by Matthew Chan. This dish includes shredded chicken, barbecued pork and Chinese mushroom stir fried and served in a thin pancake. Chan said that this was his effort to recreate Peking duck with less expensive ingredients.
- Mustard prawns is a dish inspired by Western cuisine. The main ingredients include prawns, cooking wine, mustard and sweet and sour sauce.
- Dim sim was developed by Chinese chef William Wing Young around 1945 in Melbourne. Dim sim is a dumpling with thick (crispy) skin filled with meat and usually fried.
- Broad beans, bean curd and Chinese chutney (BBC) is a vegetarian dish popularised by the Adelaide Chinese restaurant Ying Chow. It is popular in South Australia and consists of stir-fried edamame and marinated firm bean curd in a sauce consisting of pickled cabbage, garlic, chilli and soy sauce.
- Billy Kee chicken is a dish that hails from Sydney's Chinatown in the 1950s. Named after local identity Billy Kee, it consists of fried chicken or pork in a sauce made with red wine, Worcestershire sauce, five spice, garlic and tomato sauce.
- Ham and chicken rolls are an appetiser made with chicken wrapped around ham, then coated with a caul fat and egg batter that is then deep fried. Often accompanied by sweet and sour sauce on the side.
- Mango pancakes have been a staple dish of Yum Cha restaurants in Sydney since the 1980s. They consist of a thin mango crepe filled with whipped cream and chunks of mango.
- Honey king prawns and honey chicken is a main dish of either battered prawns or chicken pieces coated in a honey sauce and covered in sesame seeds. Often served over crispy fried rice noodles.
- Mongolian lamb is a staple dish consisting of stir-fried lamb pieces and spring onions cooked in a soy and hoisin-based sauce. It is often served on a hot sizzling iron dish.
- Honey chilli chicken was popularised by the Australian Women's Weekly Chinese Cooking Class cookbook originally published in 1978.
- Satay combination is a dish served on a plate with a mix of beef, chicken and seafood. Often served with a bowl of lemon essence that is set alight in the middle of the dish.
- Shandong chicken is common in Chinese restaurants around Australia and based on the Hong Kong-style crispy fried chicken. It is served with a light black vinegar-based dressing and often contains garlic, chilli and coriander.
- XO pipis is a dish common throughout seafood Cantonese restaurants that combines the native pipi (also known as Goolwa cockles) stir-fried with Hong Kong-style XO sauce.

== See also ==
- Australian cuisine
- Christmas Island cuisine
- Hong Kong cuisine
- New Zealand Chinese cuisine
- Succulent Chinese Meal meme
