= Denise Drysdale =

Australian television personality, actress and comedian

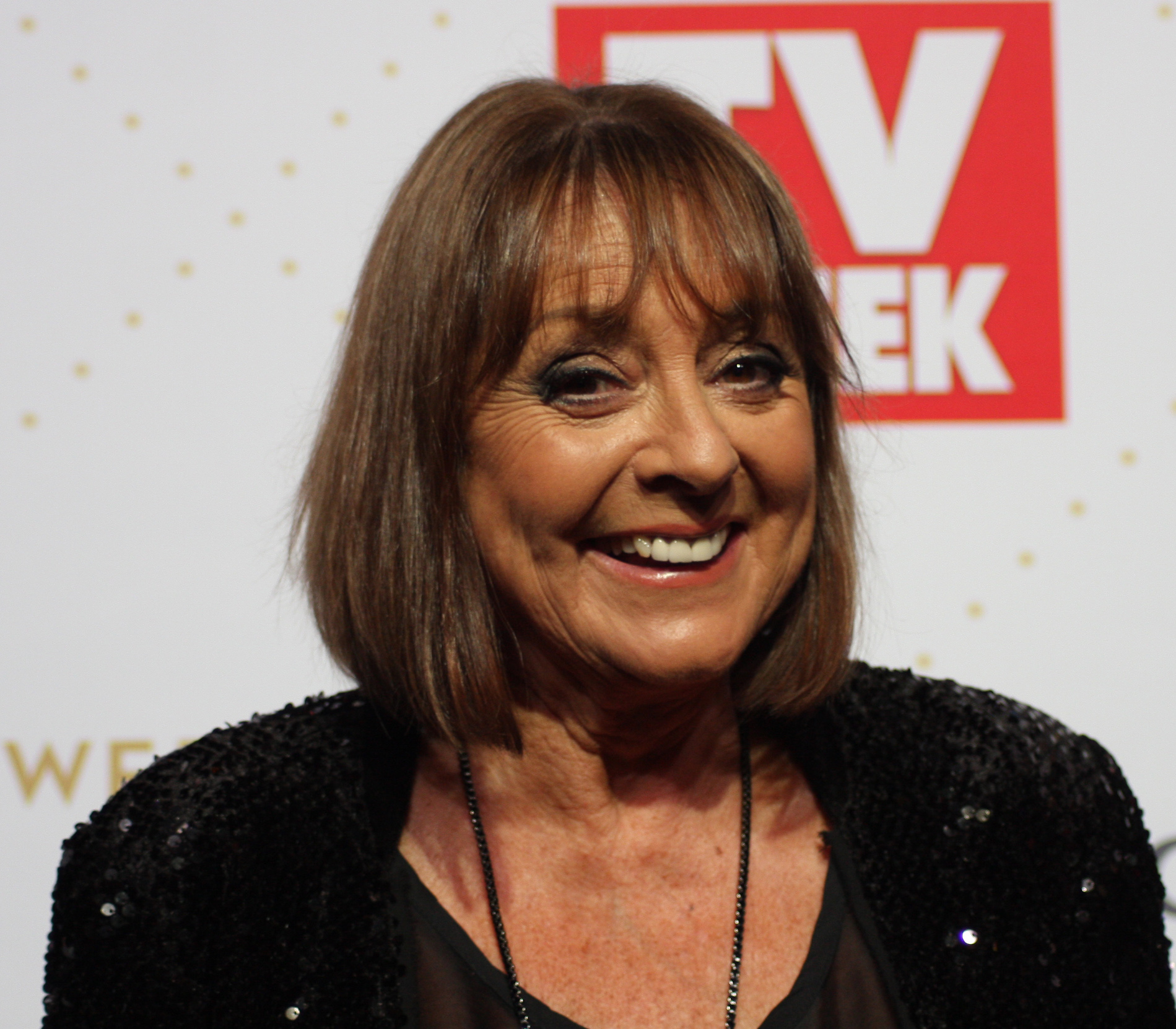
- Drysdale at the 2016 Logie Awards at the Crown Palladium
- Born: Denice Anne Christina Drysdale; 5 December 1948 (age 77); Moorabbin, Victoria, Australia
- Other name: Ding Dong
- Occupations: Television presenter; variety entertainer; actress; singer; dancer; comedian
- Years active: 1951–present
- Employer: Network 10
- Children: 2
- Awards: 2× Gold Logie

Denise Anne Christina Drysdale (born 5 December 1948) is an Australian television presenter, variety entertainer, actress, singer, dancer and comedian. She is often affectionately known as "Ding Dong", a nickname invented by fellow performer Ernie Sigley. She was formerly a co-host of the morning show Studio 10.

== Early life ==
=== Childhood ===
Born in the Melbourne suburb of Moorabbin, Drysdale and her family moved to Port Melbourne when she was three-and-a-half, where her parents ran the Fountain Inn Hotel. They lived there for eleven years, during which time Drysdale attended Kilbride Ladies Convent, South Melbourne.

=== Career beginnings ===
Drysdale's career began soon after the move to Port Melbourne. Referring to regulations for public bars to cease serving alcohol at 6pm, she observed:

During that time it was the 6 o'clock swill, and Mum didn't want her little girl seeing all that drinking, so she sent me to dancing, to May Downs. May Downs was an amazing woman. She taught us 150% is what you gave in any performance, or don't bother. And of course, that's got me into strife over the years.

By the age of six, Drysdale had won a number of dancing competitions. In 1955, she was mentioned by name, in a feature in The Age, as one of the youngest members of the cast of the pantomime Jack and Jill at the Tivoli Theatre.

At about ten years of age, she began her television career with GTV9 in Melbourne, working in the junior ballet on the Tarax Show. She was later sacked when she gained weight and developed breasts.

We'd been there about a year and a bit, and on the holidays I had put on weight, but not much, and as you know, if you put someone in a nice tutu, they don't have bosoms—they have very flat chests. Pete Smith always said, "You grew boobs, they had to get rid of you." They couldn't do it today. And I've suffered to this day. I still stand on the scales six times a day to check whether I've put on half a pound or a pound.

Photographed by a Channel Nine photographer, Drysdale won the annual Girl of the Year Award in Everybody's magazine in 1964.

At age seventeen, Drysdale joined the new show Kommotion as a go-go girl, becoming Melbourne's first go-go dancer.

Drysdale was invited to tour Australia with Ray Brown & the Whispers. She was then offered a recording contract and appeared in 26 episodes of the ABC's Dig We Must.

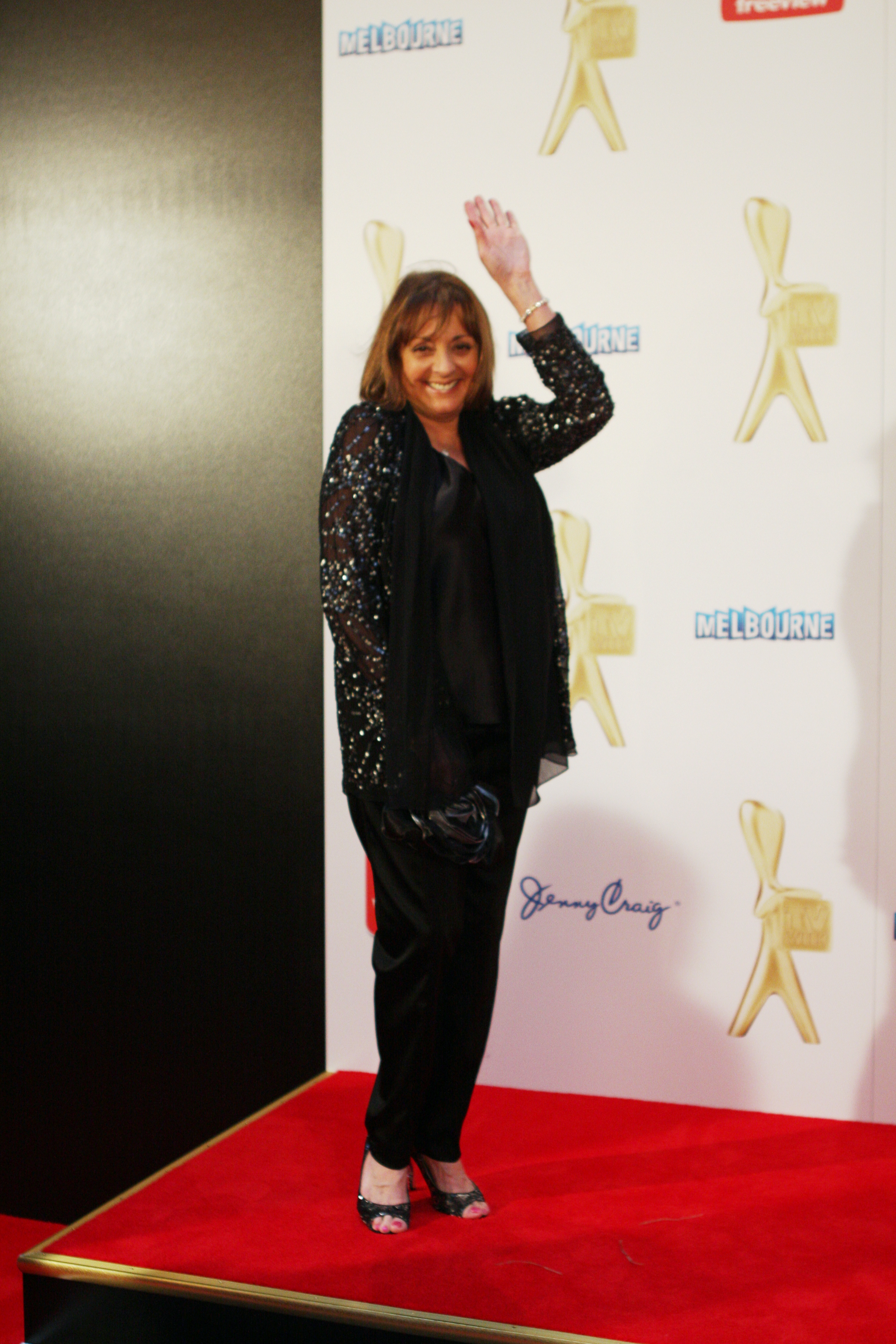
Drysdale at the Logies, 2011

== Career ==
In the 1960s, Drysdale appeared as a dancer on In Melbourne Tonight. In 1966, she performed on The Go!! Show, and was voted third most popular female vocalist by the readers of Go-Set. This popularity led to an invitation to perform for the troops in Vietnam for three weeks in 1967, along with Patti Newton, the Strangers, and Doug Owen. In 1969, she went to the Far East to entertain American troops.

In 1974, she became Ernie Sigley's barrel girl on The Ernie Sigley Show. It was here she gained the nickname 'Ding Dong'. In 1975, Drysdale and Sigley released "Hey Paula" as a duet; the single reached #2 on the Australian charts. Later that year Drysdale won the TV Week Gold Logie for the Most Popular Female Personality on Australian TV, and won her second Gold Logie the following year. In the same period, she also won consecutive Silver Logies.

Drysdale has appeared on numerous television shows, including The Norman Gunston Show, Celebrity Squares, Young Talent Time, Countdown, Division 4, Homicide, Bellbird and Celebrity Name Game. She has also worked in regional television in Victoria including guest appearances on BTV-6 Ballarat and hosting a morning magazine show on GLV-8 in the 1980s. As an actress, she has appeared in the movies The Last of the Knucklemen, Snapshot, and Blowing Hot and Cold.

On stage, she has appeared in plays and musicals, including Salad Days, Grease, The Barry Crocker Show, Two Gentlemen of Verona and Hello, Dolly! in 1994. She also spent two years in Sydney appearing on television shows Beauty and the Beast and "Weekend Sydney" between 1981 and 1983 before returning to her home town of Melbourne, Victoria.

In 1989, Drysdale joined Ernie Sigley to host In Melbourne Today, and in 1991 began a Sydney version of the show In Sydney Today. The two programs later merged to a single program: Ernie and Denise. Also in 1989, she was asked to fill in on Hey Hey It's Saturday due to Jacki MacDonald being ill and subsequently leaving. Drysdale stayed with the show for over a year before leaving due to ongoing rumours of a feud between her and host Daryl Somers. Over the years both have denied such rumours. In 1994, Drysdale returned to host an episode of Hey Hey It's Saturday in Somers' absence. She also returned for one of the reunion shows in 2009.

In the late 1990s Drysdale appeared in the reboot of IMT on the Nine Network.

In 1998, she joined the Seven Network to present her own show for the first time, called Denise. This program lasted four seasons.

In 2005, Channel 9 chose Drysdale as one of the 50 most important people on television for the last 50 years.

In January 2010, Drysdale joined Network Ten's new morning show The Circle alongside Yumi Stynes, Chrissie Swan and Gorgi Coghlan as host. She remained on the show for two seasons, leaving at the end of the 2011 season. She reappeared as a special guest on the final episode in 2012.

Drysdale regularly performed around Australia on the club circuit, often with her television partner, Ernie Sigley.

It was announced Drysdale would join as permanent co-host of Studio 10 in 2016 after appearing as a regular fill-in presenter, sharing the position with Ita Buttrose.

In June 2018, Drysdale joined the cast of Neighbours as Nance Sluggett. She made her first appearance on 3 October 2018.

In March 2024, she was announced as a contestant on the tenth season of I'm a Celebrity...Get Me Out of Here!. On 10 April 2024, she was the first celebrity eliminated from the season.

== Personal life ==
Drysdale was married to scriptwriter and actor Christopher Milne for ten years until their separation in 1989. They have two sons, and a grandson. Drysdale sold her home in Victoria and moved to Queensland for its climate.

== Filmography ==
=== Film ===
Year	Film	Character	Type
1979	Snapshot (aka The Day After Halloween)	Lily	Feature film
1979	The Last of the Knucklemen	Whore	Feature film
1989	Blowing Hot and Cold	Shelley	Feature film

=== Television ===
Year	Title	Character	Type
1973	Matlock Police	Shop Assistant / Maid	TV series, 2 episodes
1973, 1974	Homicide	Kate / Margaret Brett / Midge / Jenny / Sue	TV series, 5 episodes
1973, 1974	Division 4	Gloria / Jill Bates / Wendy / Meredith Mckenzie / Shirley	TV series, 5 episodes
1975	Bellbird		TV series
1976	The Bluestone Boys	Nurse Peachum	TV series
1976	Me & Mr Thorne	Sally	TV movie
1978	The Truckies		TV series, 1 episode
1979, 1980	Cop Shop	Josie Brown / Rhonda Mather	TV series, 3 episodes
1981	And Here Comes Bucknuckle		TV series
1985	Neighbours	Yvette	TV series, 1 episode
1987	Hey Dad..!	'Have a Go' judge	TV series, 1 episode
1989	The Flying Doctors	Marge Malarvy	TV series, 1 episode
2010	Sleuth 101	Marjorie	TV series, 1 episode
2014	The Flamin' Thongs	Brenda Thong (voice)	TV series, 26 episodes
2014	Please Like Me	Ginger	TV series, 5 episodes
2018	Neighbours	Nance Slugget	TV series, 2 episodes

=== Television (as self) ===
Year	Title	Character	Type
1956	The Tarax Show	Herself	TV series
1962	Sunnyside Up	Herself	TV series
1963	In Melbourne Tonight	Guest	TV series
1966	Four Corners	Go-go dancer	TV series, 1 episode
1966–1967	The Go!! Show	Go-go dancer	TV series, 11 episodes
1966–1967	Kommotion	Go-go dancer	TV series
1967	Start Living	Herself	TV series
1967	Dig We Must	Herself	TV series, 26 episodes
1968	Uptight	Guest performer (singing "Rescue Me")	TV series, 1 episode
1973	The Barry Crocker Comedy Hour	Guest	TV special
1973	The Graham Kennedy Show	Guest	TV series, 5 episodes
1974–1976	The Ernie Sigley Show	Barrel girl	TV series, 179 episodes
1974	Countdown	Guest performer (singing "The Loving Song")	TV series, 3 episodes
1975	Countdown	Guest performer (singing "Green")	TV series, 1 episode
1975	Yooralla Telethon	Herself	TV special
1975	The 17th Annual TV Week Logie Awards	Gold Logie winner	TV special
1975	The Norman Gunston Show	Guest performer (singing "Having My Baby" with Norman Gunston)	TV series, 1 episode
1975, 1976	Celebrity Squares	Panellist	TV series, 4 episodes
1976	The 18th Annual TV Week Logie Awards	Gold Logie winner	TV special
1976	Ernie	Guest	TV series
1976	Countdown	Guest performer (singing "I'll Be Your Baby Tonight")	TV series, 1 episode
1976	Bandstand '76	Herself (singing "Love May Be The Answer")	TV series, 1 episode
1976	The Bob Maumill Show	Guest	TV series, regular
1977	The Celebrity Game	Panellist	TV series
1977	Royal Children's Hospital Good Friday Appeal	Herself	TV special
1977	Six Tonight	Guest	TV special
1978	The 20s and All That Jazz	Herself	TV special
1978	The Peter Couchman Show	Guest	TV series, 1 episode
1979; 1980	Young Talent Time	Guest	TV series, 2 episodes
1980	Celebrity Tattletales	Panellist	TV series, 1 episode
1980; 1981; 1985	The Mike Walsh Show	Guest	TV series, 3 episodes
1981	The Don Lane Show	Guest performer (singing "Hey Paula" with Ernie Sigley)	TV series, 1 episode
1981–1982	Beauty and the Beast	Regular panellist	TV series
1982	John Laws' Beauty and the Beast	Panellist	TV series, 4 episodes
1982	Mastermind	Contestant	TV series, 1 episode
1983	The Daryl Somers Show	Herself / Mary Loo Bannister in 'Detergent Place', Detergent Ad Lady / Mrs Jenkins	TV series, 4 episodes
1983	Weekend Sydney	Host	TV series
1989–1990, 1994, 1995, 1996, 2009, 2010	Hey Hey It's Saturday	Co-host / "Red Faces" guest / Guest host	TV series
1984	The Love Game	Panellist (with Andrew Clarke & Red Symons)	TV series, 1 episode
1984–1988	Channel Seven Perth Telethon	Herself	TV special
1984	Life's a Risky Business	Herself	Film documentary
1985	Daryl Somer's Blankety Blanks	Panellist	TV series
1985	It's a Knockout	Contestant	TV series, 1 episode
1986	Moomba Procession	Herself	TV special
1986	Channel Ten Telethon	Herself	TV special
1986	Late Night with Jono and Dano	Guest	TV series
1986	Star Search	Guest judge	TV series, 1 episode
1987	Have a Go	Regular guest judge	TV series
1987	Say G'Day	Regular guest	TV series
1987	You've Got to Be Joking	Guest	TV series, 1 episode
1988	Life Education Television Appeal	Herself	TV special
1989, 1996	Burke's Backyard	Celebrity Gardener	TV series, 1 episode
1989–1990	In Melbourne Today	Co-host	TV series
1989	Carols By Candlelight	Herself	TV Special
1991–1992	In Sydney Today	Co-host	TV series
1992	Supermarket Sweep	Contestant	TV series, 1 episode
1992, 1994, 1995	What's Cooking	Guest	TV series, 3 episodes
1992	Sex	Guest	TV series, 1 episode
1992	People's Choice Awards	Presenter	TV special
1993–95	Ernie and Denise	Co-host	TV series
1993; 1996	Sale of the Century	Herself	TV series, 2 episodes
1993	Ernie and Denise in Paradise	Herself	TV special
1994	Martin St James	Herself	TV special
1994	The Beatles In Australia: 30th Anniversary	Herself	TV special
1994	Live It Up	Herself	TV series, 1 episode
1994	Midday with Derryn Hinch	Guest	TV series, 1 episode
1994	Homicide... 30 Years On	Herself	TV special
1995	TV Week Logie Awards	Herself	TV special
1995	TVTV	Herself	TV series, 1 episode
1995, 1996, 1997	This Is Your Life?	Herself	TV series, 3 episodes
1995	50 Fantastic Years	Herself	TV special
1996, 2005	Good Morning Australia	Guest	TV series, 2 episodes
1996	Monday to Friday	Guest	TV series, 1 episode
1996–98	In Melbourne Tonight	Guest	TV series
1996, 1997	Burke's Backyard	Celebrity Gardener	TV series, 2 episodes
1996	Midday with Kerri-Anne	Guest	TV series, 1 episode
1996	Television: The Way We Were	Herself	TV special
1997	Between the Lines	Herself	TV series, 1 episode
1997	Blankety Blanks	Contestant	TV series, 2 episodes
1997	This Is Your Life: Denise Drysdale	Special Guest	TV series
1996	40 Years of Logies	Host	TV special
1997	Our House	Herself	TV series, 1 episode
1998–2001	Denise	Host	TV series
1998	Celebrity Wheel of Fortune	Contestant	TV series, 1 episode
1998	Eleven A.M.	Herself	TV series, 1 episode
1999	All Star Squares	Contestant	TV series, 1 episode
1999	I Believe In Angels	Herself	TV special
2001	The Bob Downe Show	Herself (singing "Hey Paula" with Bob Downe)	TV series, 1 episode
2001	The Big Schmooze	Guest	TV series, 1 episode
2001	The Election Chaser	Herself	TV series, 1 episode
2002–03	Dig & Dine	Host	TV series
2002	New Idea: 100 Fabulous Years	Herself	TV special
2003	This Is Your Life: The Showbiz Greats	Herself	TV special
2003	This Is Your Life: The Australian Women's Weekly 70th Birthday Party	Herself	TV series, 1 episode
2003	You Must Remember This	Herself	TV series, 1 episode
2005	The Price Is Right	Contestant	TV series, 1 episode
2005	50 Years 50 Shows	Herself	TV Special
2006	Get This	Herself	Podcast series
2006	Talking Heads	Guest	TV series, 1 episode
2006	Dusty: Little By Little	Guest (with Ross Coleman)	TV series, 1 episode
2006	A Current Affair	Guest	TV series, 1 episode
2006	Today Tonight	Guest	TV series, 1 episode
2006	Made In Melbourne	Guest (with Bud Tingwell)	TV special
2006	TV Turns 50: The Events That Stopped a Nation	Herself	TV special
2006–2014	Spicks and Specks	Contestant	TV series, 6 episodes
2007	Bert's Family Feud	Game team captain	TV series, 1 episode
2008	Million Dollar Wheel of Fortune	Contestant	TV series, 1 episode
2008	This Is Your Life? Bert Newton	Herself	TV series, 1 episode
2009	The Real Graham Kennedy	Herself	ABC TV Special
2009	Talkin' 'Bout Your Generation	Panellist	TV series, 1 episode
2010	The Project	Guest	TV series, 1 episode
2010	You Have Been Watching	Panelist (with Adam Richard & Tommy Dean)	TV series, 1 episode 10: "Beauty and Fashion"
2010	Lights! Camera! Party! Television City Celebrate	Guest performer (singing "Hey Paula" with Ernie Sigley)	TV special
2010–2011, 2013	The Circle	Co-host	TV series
2011	You Have Been Watching	Guest	TV series, 1 episode
2012	Today Tonight	Guest (with Carmen Duncan & Hazel Phillips)	TV series, 1 episode
2013	Celebrity Splash! Australia	Herself	TV series, 2 episodes
2013	Tractor Monkeys	Contestant	TV series, 1 episode
2014	Dirty Laundry Live	Herself	TV series, 1 episode
2014	Young Talent Time	Guest judge	TV series, 1 episode
2014	When The Beatles Drove Us Wild	Herself	TV special
2014, 2015	A Current Affair	Guest	TV series, 2 episodes
2015	Darren & Brose	Herself	TV series, 2 episodes
2015–2023	Studio 10	Co-host	TV series
2017	Stop Laughing... This Is Serious	Herself	TV series, 1 episode
2018–19	One Fat Lady and One Thin Lady	Herself (with Jessica Rowe)	Podcast series
2018	Back In Time For Dinner	Herself	TV series, 1 episode
2019	Celebrity Name Game	Contestant	TV series, 1 episode
2021	Who Do You Think You Are?	Herself	TV series, 1 episode
2023	Christmas with the Australian Women's Weekly	Herself	TV special
2024	The Project	Guest	TV series, 1 episode
2024	I'm a Celebrity...Get Me Out of Here! 12th place	Contestant	TV series, 11 episodes

== Stage / Theatre ==
Year	Title	Role	Type
1968	Say It with Music	Singer	Lido Theatre Restaurant, Melbourne
1968	Say It with Music, Edition Two	Singer	Lido Theatre Restaurant, Melbourne
1968	Gaslight Gaieties		The George Hotel, St Kilda
1972	Buttons		
1972	Salad Days		St Martins Theatre
1972	Grease	Cha-Cha	Metro Theatre, Melbourne
1972	Mirrors	Barbara	La Mama Theatre
1974	Dimboola	The Bride	Chevron Hotel, Melbourne
1976	The Sentimental Bloke		
1979	The Barry Crocker Show		
1980	Two Gentlemen of Verona		
1983	Salad Days		
1994–95	Hello, Dolly!	Ernestina Money	State Theatre, Melbourne, Lyric Theatre, Brisbane, Her Majesty's Theatre Sydney, Festival Theatre, Adelaide, His Majesty's Theatre, Perth
2001	Upfront 7	Comedian	Melbourne Town Hall
2007	Ding Dong Downe	Comedu duo (with Bob Downe)	Melbourne Athenaeum, Sydney Opera House
2014, 2018	Denise Drysdale	Comedian	Hopgood Theatre, Adelaide, Noarlunga Centre, Adelaide
2019	Saturday Night Fever	Cameo appearance	Sydney Lyric Theatre
2023	Alive and Kicking	Comedy duo (with Craig Bennett)	Glen Street Theatre & Australian tour
2024	The Two of Us	Comedy duo (with Normie Rowe)	Penrith Panthers

== Discography ==
=== Charting singles ===
List of singles, with selected chart positions
Year	Title	Peak chart positions	Certification
Year	Title	AUS	Certification
1974	"Hey Paula" (with Ernie Sigley)	2	AUS: Gold
1974	"The Loving Song"/"Green"	42	

== Awards and nominations ==
=== Go-Set Pop Poll ===
The Go-Set Pop Poll was coordinated by teen-oriented pop music newspaper Go-Set and was established in February 1966 and conducted an annual poll during 1966 to 1972 of its readers to determine the most popular personalities.

Year	Nominee / work	Award	Result
1966	herself	Female Vocal	3rd

=== Logie Awards ===
The Logie Awards (officially the TV Week Logie Awards) is an annual gathering to celebrate Australian television, sponsored and organised by magazine TV Week, with the first ceremony in 1959, known then as the TV Week Awards, the awards are presented in 20 categories representing both public and industry voted awards. Drysdale has won two Gold Logie awards for Most Popular Female Personality on Australian television.

Year	Nominee / work	Award	Result
Logie Awards of 1975	herself	Gold Logie	Won
Logie Awards of 1976	herself	Gold Logie	Won

In 1998, as part of Melbourne's Moomba Festival, Drysdale was crowned 'Moomba Monarch'.

In January 2008, Drysdale was awarded the 'Australia Day Citizen of the Year' award by Baw Baw Shire.

In 2018, Drysdale was honoured by Australia Post with her portrait featuring on a special collection of post stamps issued as part of "The Legends of Television" series.
