= Breakfast (Australian TV program) =

2012 Australian news TV series

- Breakfast Logo
- Also known as: Ten Breakfast
- Genre: Breakfast news program
- Presented by: Paul Henry; Kathryn Robinson
- Country of origin: Australia
- Original language: English
- No. of seasons: 1
- No. of episodes: 202

Production
- Executive producer: Sarah Bristow
- Production locations: Sydney, New South Wales
- Running time: 150 minutes (2 hours, 30 minutes) (inc. ads)

Original release
- Network: Network Ten
- Release: 23 February – 30 November 2012

Related
- Good Morning Australia (1981–1992); Wake Up (2013–2014); Ten News

Breakfast was an Australian breakfast television program which aired live on Network Ten on weekdays, as well as a weekly highlights program on Saturday at 11:00 am. It had a format consisting of news, sport and weather updates every half-hour from 6:00 am to 8:00 am with a mixture of debate, current affairs and regular segments in between. The show originally ran from 6:00 am–9:00 am on weekdays preceding The Circle before being shortened to a two-and-a-half-hour show, as part of the Mornings on Ten lineup. The presenting line-up consisted of Paul Henry and Kathryn Robinson, along with broadcast meteorologist Magdalena Roze who presented weather updates, while News & Sport updates were presented by various Network Ten journalists. Before being made redundant at Ten, Deborah Knight participated in Breakfast's audition.

The show differed from other breakfast shows by being mostly unscripted, replacing Ten's previous line-up of Ten Early News and children's programming including Toasted TV, Totally Wild, Scope and Wurrawhy. This was Network Ten's second foray into the breakfast television market, with the network airing Australia's first breakfast program, Good Morning Australia, from 1981 to 1992.

Although the show was originally planned for a 27 February 2012 starting date, due to the political crisis Breakfast began on 23 February 2012. During the 2012 Summer Olympics, and following the axing of The Circle, Breakfast adjusted its format. On 12 November 2012, it was announced that Breakfast would broadcast its 202nd and final show, on 30 November 2012.

== History ==
It was announced on 17 August 2011. that Network Ten would launch a new breakfast program to take on Today and Sunrise, which take in $100 million in advertising revenue a year, compared to Ten's current $3 million. It was also announced that the program would be modelled around Ten's current affairs/comedy program The Project with Andrew Rochford as one of the presenters. In the months to follow, it was announced that the other presenters would include Paul Henry, Kathryn Robinson, Magdalena Roze and Reuben Mourad.

It was initially speculated that Breakfast would launch on 16 January 2012, the date that The Circle debuted in the 9 am timeslot, however that date was later pushed back to March 2012 due to the fact that a third co-host was at the time yet to be found. The launch date was then set to be 27 February 2012, two weeks after the ratings season began. However, on 22 February 2012, Network Ten announced the show would launch early on Thursday 23 February 2012 due to a political crisis. Breakfast's first broadcast was extended until around 10:20 am. Paul Henry opened the first Breakfast with these words: "It is Thursday the 23rd February and it is game on". He was referring to the leadership showdown dominating the headlines at the time, as well as Ten's ambitious move to enter into the crowded Breakfast TV market.

On 15 August 2012, Ten announced the following Saturday it would launch a highlights program titled The Breakfast Week to air Saturdays from 11 am-12 pm.

On 12 November 2012, it was announced that Breakfast would end on 30 November 2012. The axing was part of the network's wider budget cuts which saw more than 100 staff lose their jobs from various Ten News roles. A newspaper said other staff at the network resented Henry, claiming many wouldn't look at him when he walked in the room, and were planning to boycott the Christmas party. Despite the show's axing, Ten has shown interest in developing a new breakfast program of a similar style to launch sometime in 2013. It will be fronted by a brand new hosting team. Former Sunrise producer Adam Boland has been signed to produce the new program.

Notable guests to have appeared on the show once, or on a number of occasions include: Tony Abbott (Federal Opposition Leader), John Alexander (Former tennis player and politician), Carrie Bickmore (Co host of The Project), Lara Bingle (Model and television presenter), Julie Bishop (politician), Bob Brown (retired politician), George Calombaris (Celebrity chef), Julia Gillard (Prime Minister), Tom Hafey (AFL legend), Colin Lane (Comedian), Nicole Livingstone (Former Olympic swimmer), Hamish Macdonald, Shaun Micallef, Gerry Harvey, Sarah Murdoch, Charlie Pickering (Comedian), Matt Preston (food critic), Kate Ritchie (actor and television presenter), John Robertson (NSW opposition leader), Hugh Sheridan (actor and television presenter), Chris Anderson (NRL legend) and Merrick Watts (radio comedian).

=== Format changes ===
When Breakfast launched on 23 February 2012, it was hosted by Henry, Robinson and Rochford and aired from 6 am until 9 am. Robinson would present news and sport updates on the half-hour with Roze presenting weather forecasts. The set consisted of a large red couch where Henry, Robinson and Rochford would generally present from. An Australiana backdrop existed behind the couch and was coupled with various props including an outback windmill, a moped and a wooden crate as a coffee table. A large screen, made up of 16 flat panel displays, was located adjacent to the couch and was used by Roze to present weather updates.

On 21 May 2012, Ron Wilson, Network Ten's former Ten Early News presenter, was employed to present news and sport updates, a role previously held by Robinson. At around the same time, Rochford's role in the show began to decrease with him presenting his segments from the Network Ten newsroom. On 29 June 2012, Rochford left the show with reports suggesting on-air tension with Henry led to his departure. One week later, the show's executive producer, Majella Wiemers, resigned from the show, being replaced by her deputy Sarah Bristow.

On 30 July 2012, Network Ten began to restructure its morning lineup. As part of this plan, The Circle was axed, Breakfast was shorted to an 8:30 am finish, Ten Morning News was reintroduced, and Wurrawhy was returned to its former 8:30 am timeslot. These changes saw Wilson depart the show to present Ten Morning News, and Matt Doran and Natarsha Belling introduced to present news and sport updates throughout the week. Other alterations to Breakfast included a shift towards a stronger focus on breaking and analysing news, with a brand new set to match the national Ten News theme. The large screen used in the former set was relocated to the newsroom. Due to the abrupt axing of The Circle, advertorials and infomercials were screened during Breakfast for a short period of time to complete the network's contracts with various parties. In doing so, Breakfast, became the first Australian news and current affair program to feature advertorials and infomercials.

Presenter	Role	Tenure
Paul Henry	Co-host	Feb–Nov 2012
Kathryn Robinson	Co-host	Feb–Nov 2012
Matt Doran	Newsreader (Monday and Tuesday)	Aug–Nov 2012
Natarsha Belling	Newsreader (Wednesday-Friday)	Aug–Nov 2012
Magdalena Roze	Residential meteorologist	Feb–Nov 2012

On 13 August 2012, Kathryn Robinson was absent from the program with Paul Henry presenting the program solo. Henry presented every day since the show's inception.

The fill-in news & sport presenters were Natasha Exelby and Lachlan Kennedy, whilst Summer Burke and Reuben Mourad were the fill-in weather presenters.

== Segments ==
News, sport and detailed weather reports were presented on the half-hour. As of 6 August 2012 either Henry or Robinson also presented news headlines on the quarter-hour. In addition Metropolitan viewers also received regular traffic updates for their respective city from SUNA traffic. Until 3 August 2012 after the 8:30 am news, the hosts crossed to Yumi Stynes, Gorgi Coghlan or another Circle guest host to find out what was coming up on The Circle. The hosts were joined by Wendell Sailor and Roger Oldridge respectively to preview and review NRL and AFL matches Monday and Friday mornings at 6:40 am during the respective seasons. Viewers were able to express their views by phoning the Henry Hotline, a talkback radio style segment; these calls were replayed later in the show.

In addition Around Australia was a segment where the hosts cross to Melinda Nucifora in Sydney, Ben Lewis in Melbourne, Jonathan Lea in Brisbane and Joe Hill in Adelaide to find out what is making news in their respective states. Jacqueline Maddock was the show's finance presenter and Alexis Christoforous also regularly appeared on the show as an international business correspondent. In addition a highlights segment called Mad Week aired on Friday mornings, showing highlights of the week's program.

At the end of the day's program, Henry would dedicate it to someone in the news. Listed below are regular contributors to the program and their contributions.

Presenter	Role	Frequency
Melinda Nucifora	New South Wales correspondent	Daily
Ben Lewis	Victoria Correspondent	Daily
Jonathan Lea	Queensland correspondent	Daily
Joe Hill	South Australia correspondent	Daily
Angela Bishop	entertainment reporter	Occasional
Brett Mason	Europe correspondent	Occasional
Kathryn Eisman	Los Angeles correspondent	Weekly
Hugh Riminton	political editor	Weekly
Reuben Mourad	reporter	Occasional
Daniel Sutton	United States correspondent	Occasional
Emma Dallimore	United States correspondent	Occasional
Wendell Sailor	NRL reporter	Twice per week (seasonal)
Rebecca Gilsenan	law	Occasional
Roger Oldridge	AFL reporter	Twice per week (seasonal)
Rosie Beaton	social commentator	Occasional
Tali Jatali	fashion	Occasional
Brendan Maclean	social media	Occasional
Julian Schiller	social media	Occasional
Lady Danielle Di-masi	etiquette	Occasional
Bruce Hawker	politics	Weekly
Josh Frydenberg	politics	Weekly
Ed Husic	politics	Weekly
Michael Kroger	politics	Occasional
Richard Alston	politics	Occasional
Nick Gulliver	technology	Occasional
Jono Coleman	media	Weekly
Kathryn Mayne	personal shopper	Occasional
Marc Fennell	movie reviews	Weekly
Victoria Murphy	Sport	Daily

== Broadcast ==
Breakfast was broadcast from Network Ten's Sydney studios, located in Pyrmont and was broadcast live or delayed as explained below. However, in the event of a major news event, it was broadcast live nationwide.

Due to Australia having multiple time zones, especially during Daylight Saving Time (which is not kept in Queensland, Western Australia and the Northern Territory), Breakfast was not broadcast live in all of the country but was delayed in some states. In New South Wales (including ACT), Victoria and Tasmania, Breakfast was broadcast live all year round. In Queensland it was broadcast live except during Daylight Saving Time when it is delayed by one hour. The Northern Territory had a 30-minute delay and 90 minutes during Daylight Saving Time. South Australia had a 30-minute delay all year and Western Australia had a two-hour delay and three hours during Daylight Saving Time.

=== Special editions and alternate broadcasts ===
- Breakfast's first broadcast, on 23 February 2012, was extended to around 10:20 am to cover the political crisis.
- On 27 February 2012, Breakfast was extended to 12:00 pm, replacing The Circle and Wurrawhy, to cover the Labor leadership ballot. The broadcast was originally planned to end at 11:30 am and was broadcast live throughout Australia. It attracted the show's highest ever viewership of 69,000
- On 25 April 2012, to commemorate ANZAC Day, Breakfast commenced at 5 am and finished at 11.30 am, replacing The Project (encore) and The Circle. This was broadcast live around Australia with Paul Henry and Ron Wilson (who was to later join the show permanently) live in the studio, as well as Andrew Rochford live from King's Park in Perth, Kathryn Robinson live from Martin Place in Sydney and Magdalena Roze live from St Kilda Road in Melbourne to cover events planned to commemorate ANZAC Day. On this particular day, Breakfast was the only one out of Australia's four breakfast TV programs to provide live extended coverage of ANZAC Day, with other networks opting to air alternative programming before 5:30 am and after 9 am.
- In March 2012, during Ten's broadcast of the 2012 Australian Grand Prix, Henry, Rochford, Robinson and Roze all presented guest interviews and segments live from Ten's trackside broadcast facility at Albert Park in Melbourne where the event is held.
- During the course of the 2012 London Olympics, two Breakfast presenters Magdalena Roze and Ben Lewis broadcast live from London.

=== Memorable segments ===
- One memorable segment was at 8:20 am on 22 June 2012 when a guest appeared drunk to talk about racehorse Black Caviar to which Henry remarked "Can you hold your liquor or not?, because we've been drinking heavily", however due to Breakfast's poor ratings the incident went relatively unnoticed.
- Awkward moments on 9 August 2012 when none of the team could remember the date for the closing ceremony of the 2012 London Olympics.
- On 28 August 2012, a security guard interrupted a live cross with reporter Joe Hill.
- A representative from the Construction Forestry Mining and Energy Union did not respond kindly to a question from Henry during an interview on 31 August 2012 with the comment "No apologies for the fact that your show has no viewers."
- On 14 September 2012, Henry and Robinson interviewed Pricasso, who can paint with his penis, who then painted portraits of them
- On 2 November 2012, as Henry was telling the story of how he had cut his finger the previous day, his co-presenters and crew left the set, one by one, until Henry was left sitting on his own at the desk until the studio's lights went out. He got up and left, before the show cut to a commercial break, after which everybody had returned.

== Reception and ratings ==
The initial reception to Breakfast was mixed, with the show being compared to other breakfast television shows, such as Today and Sunrise. Sydney Morning Herald reviewer Michael Idato described Breakfast as "free of major glitches" and that "Henry was very much the star of the show". Henry was also praised for his "infamous political incorrectness", but also met criticism by viewers during "Henry's Hotline", a segment which allows viewers to ring in and express their views about topical issues. Comments such as "You need to get rid of the guy with the glasses" and "I have never met two out of three more unprofessional hosts" being directed at Henry. Henry thanked her for watching. Positive reviews came from TVNZ, with Henry being described as having kept true to his controversial reputation in his debut.

The show came under a modest debut, with 51,000 viewers nationally tuning in to watch the show. The following Monday, the audience for Breakfast was down to 42,000. Breakfast then reduced to an average of around 40,000 viewers nationally each morning. Despite having ratings lower than other breakfast television shows, the program still beat Ten's previous line-up. Additionally, advertising revenue in the early-morning time-slot since Breakfast launched was more than double that of before.

These lacklustre ratings were highlighted with Henry making jokes about the topic. For example, when talking to an up-and-coming author in her first TV interview in an effort to reassure her he said "Just imagine nobody is watching, it's perilously close to that anyway", and also when interviewing guests, occasionally thanking them for sharing their thoughts with the "millions of people who watch this show", much to the amused response of his co-hosts. ABC1 program Q&A also poked fun at Breakfast's lack of viewers. As the panel was discussing how 1700 migrant workers had been allowed to work at Gina Rinehart's Roy Hill mining project, a tweet appeared on the bottom of the screen: "You know who could use 1700 people, Channel ten Breakfast".

Within the first twelve months, Ten had hoped for Breakfast to attract 100,000 viewers. Despite Network Ten announcing that the program would return in 2013, Breakfast was axed on 12 November 2012 due to its low ratings. The final episode of Breakfast aired on 30 November 2012 attracting its second highest viewership ever of 55,000. The network confirmed it would re-enter the breakfast television market during 2013, which they did with Wake Up.

== Controversy involving asylum seekers ==
On 16 May 2012, Henry was criticised for comments made on Breakfast regarding asylum seekers. When commenting on a newspaper article about the Australian government offering families money to house asylum seekers, Henry suggested that the idea could be "broadened out", saying: "I mean if this is all about saving money you could broaden it out. Why not criminals? Not murderers, but low level criminals. You could - the jails could be smaller and you could put them in homestay situations. The mentally ill." He later suggested that asylum seekers could be housed in linen cupboards. His remarks were featured on Media Watch.

Henry caused further controversy on 27 August 2012 by suggesting on the program that asylum seekers should "starve to death", following reports that they would be conducting a hunger strike over plans to shift them to Nauru. He issued an apology the following morning, following public backlash on Twitter.

== See also ==
- List of Australian television series
