= List of Can of Worms episodes =

The following is a list of episodes for the Australian television talk show programme, Can of Worms.

The first series was hosted by Ian "Dicko" Dickson and Meshel Laurie. The second and third series, hosted by Chrissie Swan and Dan Ilic, with James Mathison stepping in for Chrissie for 2 episodes of Season 3 during her maternity leave.

== Series overview ==
Series	Episodes	Originally aired	
Series	Episodes	First aired	Last aired
1	10	4 July 2011	5 September 2011
2	15	20 August 2012	26 November 2012
3	14	11 February 2013	20 May 2013

== Episodes ==
=== Season 1 (2011) ===
No. overall	No. in season	Title	Guests	Original release date
1	1	"Episode 1"	Craig Reucassel, George McEncroe and Jason Akermanis	4 July 2011
2	2	"Episode 2"	Don Burke, Tom Ballard and Jessica Rowe	11 July 2011
3	3	"Episode 3"	Fiona O'Loughlin, John Elliott and Maude Garrett	18 July 2011
4	4	"Episode 4"	Bob Katter, Matt Okine and Layne Beachley	25 July 2011
5	5	"Episode 5"	James Mathison, Julie Goodwin and Lawrence Mooney	1 August 2011
6	6	"Episode 6"	Angry Anderson, Greg Fleet and Elka Whalan	8 August 2011
7	7	"Episode 7"	Charlie Pickering, Nikki Phillips and Gary Mehigan	15 August 2011
8	8	"Episode 8"	Dave O'Neil, Kate Langbroek and Mark Geyer	22 August 2011
9	9	"Episode 9"	Amanda Keller, Jason Stevens and Denise Scott	29 August 2011
10	10	"Episode 10"	Jamie Dunn, Yumi Stynes and Josh Thomas	5 September 2011

=== Season 2 (2012) ===
No. overall	No. in season	Title	Guests	Original release date
11	1	"Episode 1"	Kate Langbroek, Ryan "Fitzy" Fitzgerald and Megan Gale	20 August 2012
12	2	"Episode 2"	James Mathison, Poh Ling Yeow and Nathan Hindmarsh	27 August 2012
13	3	"Episode 3"	Mia Freedman, Kris Smith and Adam Richard	3 September 2012
14	4	"Episode 4"	Mark Bosnich, Joe Hildebrand and Cal Wilson	10 September 2012
15	5	"Episode 5"	Chris Judd, Tara Moss and Dave O'Neil	17 September 2012
16	6	"Episode 6"	Ian "Dicko" Dickson, Imogen Bailey and Michael Hing	24 September 2012
17	7	"Episode 7"	Deborra-Lee Furness, Natasha Exelby and Tom Gleeson	1 October 2012
18	8	"Episode 8"	Genevieve Morris, James Mathison and Anthony Callea	8 October 2012
19	9	"Episode 9"	Kurt Fearnley, Bonnie Lythgoe and Tom Ballard	15 October 2012
20	10	"Episode 10"	Matt Okine, Julie Goodwin and John Safran	22 October 2012
21	11	"Episode 11"	Dermott Brereton, Kris Smith and George McEncroe	29 October 2012
22	12	"Episode 12"	Todd McKenney, Denise Scott and Tom Elliott	5 November 2012
23	13	"Episode 13"	Adam Richard, Michelle Bridges and Gary Mehigan	12 November 2012
24	14	"Episode 14"	Live Best Of #1	19 November 2012
25	15	"Episode 15"	Live Best Of #2	26 November 2012

=== Season 3 (2013) ===
Can of Worms was renewed for a third series on October 23, 2012. Chrissie Swan returned as host, with the series being broadcast live for the first six episodes.

No. overall	No. in season	Title	Guests	Original release date
26	1	"Episode 1"	Julie Goodwin, Jason Akermanis and Dave O'Neil	11 February 2013
27	2	"Episode 2"	Rebel Wilson, Arj Barker and Colin Hay	18 February 2013
28	3	"Episode 3"	Alex Perry, Brynne Edelsten and Lehmo	25 February 2013
29	4	"Episode 4"	Ross Noble, Kris Smith and Phil Jamieson	4 March 2013
30	5	"Episode 5"	Magda Szubanski, Megan Gale and Matt Preston	11 March 2013
31	6	"Episode 6"	James Mathison, Jimeoin and Chris Isaak	18 March 2013
32	7	"Episode 7"	All Stars (unseen footage)	25 March 2013
33	8	"Episode 8"	Meshel Laurie, Yumi Stynes and Bonnie Lythgoe	8 April 2013
34	9	"Episode 9"	Tim Ferguson, Genevieve Morris and Merv Hughes	15 April 2013
35	10	"Episode 10"	Lawrence Mooney, Anthony Callea and Anna Meares	22 April 2013
36	11	"Episode 11"	Tommy Little, George McEncroe and Red Symons	29 April 2013
37	12	"Episode 12"	Julie Bishop, Kris Smith and Felicity Ward	6 May 2013
38	13	"Episode 13"	Tony Squires, Danielle Spencer and Matt Okine	13 May 2013
39	14	"Episode 14"	Kurt Fearnley, Layne Beachley and Tom Ballard	20 May 2013
