= The Great Australian Spelling Bee season 2 =

The Great Australian Spelling Bee
- Season 2
- No. of episodes: 10

Release
- Original network: Network Ten; Eleven
- Original release: 17 July – 17 September 2016

Season chronology
- ← Previous; Season 1

The second season of The Great Australian Spelling Bee premiered on 17 July 2016 on Network Ten. The season sees Grant Denyer and Chrissie Swan return as hosts.

Poor ratings for the four initial episodes of the season resulted in the series being moved from Sundays to the lesser viewed Saturday from its fifth episode. From its seventh episode, the show was moved to Network Ten's sister channel, Eleven.

== Format ==
This is the structure of the series for season two:

=== Laser Letters ===
In Laser Letters, a new challenge for 2016, each team stand behind a buzzer podium facing the big screen. The pronouncer will read out four words that appear via a laser projection on the big screen, visible for a short amount of time. To keep the spellers on their toes, one word will be spelt incorrectly. Once a speller thinks they have identified the mistake they must buzz in and spell the word correctly. When they identify and spell the word correctly they win a point for their team. The first two teams to get three points are safe and the other teams will go into the Spelling Bee.

=== Letter by Letter Knock-Out ===
Each speller takes a turn to give one letter at a time to spell a given word. When a speller gives the last letter of the word, the next speller states that word to signal that it is finished. The pronouncer then gives the next word, and the next speller spells out the first letter of that new word. The challenge continues until a speller makes a mistake. That speller is then out of the round and the challenge continues until there is one speller standing. Three rounds of Letter by Letter Knock Out are played to determine the three spellers to compete in the Ultimate Spelling Bee. The winner of the Ultimate Spelling Bee is the Spelling Bee champion. Tristan won the Great Australian Spelling Bee Champion for 2016.

=== Show and Spell ===
Each team member must line up behind a buzzer. Clues and letters are revealed until a speller buzzes to identify the word that the clues point to. If a speller spells a correctly identified word accurately, they gain a point for their team. The first two teams to reach a score of three are safe. The third and final team must face an individual Spelling Bee, where two members will be sent home.

=== Speed Spell Duo ===
With rules similar to Speed Spell Relay, this Speed Spell involves two spellers from the same team stepping into the Spell Gate together. The duo is given 60 seconds to spell as many words correctly as possible. The spellers will each spell one word at the time taking turns. When a speller makes a mistake that speller will step out of the Spell Gate and the other speller continues spelling. The challenge ends when 60 seconds have passed or both team members have made a mistake. Once all teams have had a turn, the bottom two teams will go into Spelling Bee.

=== Speed Spell Relay ===
This Speed Spell is a team relay challenge. One team at a time steps into the super-sized Spell Gate and is given 60 seconds to correctly spell as many words as possible. When a speller makes a mistake that speller will step out of the Spell Gate and the other team members continue. The challenge ends when 60 seconds have passed or all team members have made a mistake. The team with the fewest words spelt at the end of the round will go into Spelling Bee.

=== Speed Spell Showdown ===
Each speller steps into the Spell Gate, which lights up during a 60-second countdown. Spellers must spell as many words correctly as possible. If a mistake is made, the speller's time stops. The top speller who completes the most number of correct words in the least amount of time is safe from elimination, while the rest move on to play Spelling Bee.

=== Spelling Bee (Individual Spelling) ===
Spellers are divided into groups, with four spellers in each group. Members of each group compete in a traditional spelling bee, where they spell until there are only two spellers left. If all four spellers spell correctly or incorrectly in the same round, they will all spell again until two remain.

=== Superword ===
In Superword, duos have to find words in a grid of nine letters revealed on the big screen. Words must contain five letters or more and include the centre letter. Spellers can use a letter only once and cannot name a word already given by another team. Whenever a speller of a team thinks that they have identified a word, they buzz in. Once identified correctly they must spell the word correctly to win a point for their team. The first five teams to get three points are safe. If a duo identifies the Superword which uses all nine letters, they immediately receive safe passage to the next show. The two bottom teams will play in Spelling Bee.

=== Superword (Individual Spelling) ===
In Superword, spellers have to find words in a grid of nine letters revealed on the big screen. Words must contain five letters or more and include the centre letter. Spellers can use a letter only once and cannot name a word already given by another speller. Whenever a speller thinks they have identified a word they buzz in. Once identified correctly they must spell the word correctly to win a point. The first two spellers to get five points are safe. If a speller identifies the Superword using all nine letters, they immediately receive safe passage to the next show. The rest move on to play the Spelling Bee.

== Season Details ==
=== Contestants ===
Name	Age	State	Competition Status
Tristan	11	VIC	Winner (Episode 10)
Zachary	8	NSW	Runner-up (Episode 10)
Annie	10	NSW	3rd (Episode 10)
Ava	10	SA	4th (Episode 10)
Zeke	10	VIC	5th (Episode 9)
Zoe	10	QLD	6th (Episode 8)
Jessica	12	NSW	7th (Episode 7)
Hanna	11	VIC	8th (Episode 7)
Max	11	QLD	9th (Episode 6)
Luca	9	SA	10th (Episode 6)
Josie	11	WA	11th (Episode 5)
Rory	8	QLD	12th (Episode 5)
William	10	NSW	13th (Episode 4)
Beau	12	WA	14th (Episode 4)
Alistair	9	QLD	15th (Episode 3)
James	12	QLD	16th (Episode 3)
Arya	10	NSW	17th (Episode 2)
Faiza	12	QLD	18th (Episode 2)
Alexia	12	VIC	=19th (Episode 1)
Marc	10	NSW	=19th (Episode 1)
Max B	9	VIC	=19th (Episode 1)
Quinn B	8	NSW	=19th (Episode 1)
Sophie J	10	WA	=19th (Episode 1)

=== Elimination Chart ===
Contestant	Top 18	Top 16	Top 14	Top 12	Top 10	Top 8	Top 6	Top 5	Top 4	Top 3
Tristan	Safe (S&S)	Safe (SSR)	Safe (SW)	Safe (S&S)	Safe (SB)	Safe (SB)	Safe (SB)	Safe (SB)	Progressed (LLKO)	Winner
Zachary	Safe (S&S)	Safe (SSR)	Safe (SW)	Safe (S&S)	Safe (SSD)	Safe (LL)	Safe (SW)	Safe (SB)	Progressed (LLKO)	Runner-up
Annie	Safe (S&S)	Safe (SSR)	Safe (SW)	Safe (S&S)	Safe (SSD)	Safe (LL)	Safe (SW)	Safe (SB)	Progressed (LLKO)	3rd
Ava	Safe (SB)	Safe (SSR)	Safe (SW)	Safe (S&S)	Safe (SSD)	Safe (LL)	Safe (SB)	Safe (SS)	4th	
Zeke	Safe (S&S)	Safe (SSR)	Safe (SB)	Safe (S&S)	Safe (SSD)	Safe (SB)	Safe (SB)	Eliminated		
Zoe	Safe (SB)	Safe (SSR)	Safe (SW)	Safe (S&S)	Safe (SSD)	Safe (LL)	Eliminated			
Jessica	Safe (S&S)	Safe (SSR)	Safe (SB)	Safe (S&S)	Safe (SSD)	Eliminated				
Hanna	Safe (SB)	Safe (SSR)	Safe (SW)	Safe (SB)	Safe (SB)	Eliminated				
Max	Safe (S&S)	Safe (SB)	Safe (SW)	Safe (SB)	Eliminated					
Luca	Safe (SB)	Safe (SSR)	Safe (SW)	Safe (S&S)	Eliminated					
Josie	Safe (S&S)	Safe (SB)	Safe (SW)	Eliminated						
Rory	Safe (S&S)	Safe (SSR)	Safe (SW)	Eliminated						
Beau	Safe (S&S)	Safe (SSR)	Eliminated							
William	Safe (S&S)	Safe (SSR)	Eliminated							
Alistair	Safe (S&S)	Eliminated								
James	Safe (S&S)	Eliminated								
Arya	Eliminated									
Faiza	Eliminated									
Key S&S: Show and Spell; SW: Superword; SSR: Speed Spell Relay; SSD: Speed Spell Duo; LL: Laser Letters; SB: Spelling Bee; LLKO: Letter by Letter Knock-Out Eliminated Safe (Spelling Bee) Won Challenge Third Place Runner-Up Winner

== Episodes ==
=== Episode 1 (17 July) ===
Each of the 36 spellers were put into a group containing four spellers (according to age), with only two from each team making it through to the Top 18. Luca & Alistair, Annie & Zeke, Hanna & Josie, Max & Tristan, Zoe & Ava, Faiza & Jessica, Beau & James, William & Arya, and Zachary & Rory made it to the Top 18.

=== Episode 2 (24 July) ===
The spellers had their first Team challenge of Show & Spell, based on words to do with Space. The spellers were put into 3 different teams of 6 (red, blue yellow ) based on the badge they chose. Each team received a post for each word the team members spelled correctly. Incorrect answers resulted in the team being locked out. The first two teams who got to 3 points first were safe. The remaining team members competed in a Spelling Bee. The first two spellers who spelled their word incorrectly was eliminated.

Team	Spellers	Results	
Team	Spellers	Show and Spell	Spelling Bee
Blue	Zeke	3 points (Safe 1st)	N/A
Blue	Jessica	3 points (Safe 1st)	N/A
Blue	Max	3 points (Safe 1st)	N/A
Blue	Alistair	3 points (Safe 1st)	N/A
Blue	Josie	3 points (Safe 1st)	N/A
Blue	James	3 points (Safe 1st)	N/A
Red	Rory	3 points (Safe 2nd)	N/A
Red	William	3 points (Safe 2nd)	N/A
Red	Tristan	3 points (Safe 2nd)	N/A
Red	Zachary	3 points (Safe 2nd)	N/A
Red	Annie	3 points (Safe 2nd)	N/A
Red	Beau	3 points (Safe 2nd)	N/A
Yellow	Arya	2 points (last place)	Failed
Yellow	Ava	2 points (last place)	Passed
Yellow	Faiza	2 points (last place)	Failed
Yellow	Hanna	2 points (last place)	Passed
Yellow	Luca	2 points (last place)	Passed
Yellow	Zoe	2 points (last place)	Passed

==== Notes ====
- The spellers of the spelling bee spelt in this order: Zoe, Hanna, Faiza, Ava, Arya, Luca.
- The spelling bee lasted 3 rounds.
  - Faiza was the only speller who had spelt her word incorrectly in the second round, and so she was eliminated first.
  - Arya was the only speller who had spelt her word incorrectly in the third round, so she was eliminated.
  - Team Blue: James Jessica Josie Alistair Max & Zeke
  - Team Red: Rory William Annie Zachary Tristan & Beau
  - Team Yellow: Luca Arya Hanna Ava Zoe & Faiza

=== Episode 3 (31 July) ===
Team	Spellers	Results	
Team	Spellers	Speed Spell Relay	Spelling Bee
Blue	Jessica	11 points (Safe 1st)	N/A
Blue	Zachary	11 points (Safe 1st)	N/A
Blue	Rory	11 points (Safe 1st)	N/A
Blue	Hanna	11 points (Safe 1st)	N/A
Green	Zoe	11 points (Safe 2nd)	N/A
Green	Ava	11 points (Safe 2nd)	N/A
Green	William	11 points (Safe 2nd)	N/A
Green	Annie	11 points (Safe 2nd)	N/A
Yellow	Beau	10 points (Safe 3rd)	N/A
Yellow	Zeke	10 points (Safe 3rd)	N/A
Yellow	Luca	10 points (Safe 3rd)	N/A
Yellow	Tristan	10 points (Safe 3rd)	N/A
Red
Red	Alistair	9 points (last place)	Failed
Red	James	9 points (last place)	Failed
Red	Josie	9 points (last place)	Passed
Red	Max	9 points (last place)	Passed

==== Notes ====
  - Teams went up to spell in this order: Green, Yellow, Blue, Red.
  - All spellers in the Green and Blue teams had correctly spelt their words, but Max in the Red team and Luca in the Yellow team had spelt their word incorrectly, at the 7th and 11th words respectively.
  - Both spellers who spelt their words incorrectly were the third member of the team to spell.
  - Luca stepped out of the gate while time was up, but they had already surpassed the word count of the Red team.
  - The spellers of the spelling bee spelt in this order: James, Max, Alistair, Josie.
  - The spelling bee lasted two rounds.
  - The second round James spelling his word incorrectly, Max correctly, Alistair incorrectly confirming Max to be safe, and Josie correctly, eliminating James and Alistair.
  - Team Blue: Jessica Zachary Rory Hanna, got 11 Points
  - Team Green: Zoe Ava William Annie, got 11 Points
  - Team Yellow: Beau Zeke Luca Tristan, got 10 Points
  - Team Red: Alistair James Max Josie, got 9 Points

=== Episode 4 (7 August) ===
The spellers compete in a new challenge Superword.

Team	Spellers	Results	
Team	Spellers	Superword	Spelling Bee
Green	Annie	3 points (Safe 1st)	N/A
Green	Hanna	3 points (Safe 1st)	N/A
Orange	Ava	3 points (Safe 2nd)	N/A
Orange	Zoe	3 points (Safe 2nd)	N/A
Purple	Josie	3 points (Safe 3rd)	N/A
Purple	Tristan	3 points (Safe 3rd)	N/A
Pink	Max	3 points (Safe 4th)	N/A
Pink	Rory	3 points (Safe 4th)	N/A
Yellow	Luca	3 points (Safe 5th)	N/A
Yellow	Zachary	3 points (Safe 5th)	N/A
Blue
Blue	Beau	2 points (last place)	Failed
Blue	Jessica	2 points (last place)	Passed
Red
Red	William	2 points (last place)	Failed
Red	Zeke	2 points (last place)	Passed

==== Notes ====
- No speller had correctly identified the Superword, being "Periscope".
- The spellers of the spelling bee spelt in this order: Beau, Jessica, Zeke, and William.
- The spelling bee of this episode only lasted one round, as Beau and William had spelt their first words wrong.

=== Episode 5 (13 August) ===
Team	Spellers	Results	
Team	Spellers	Speed Spell Relay	Spelling Bee
Red	Zoe	3 points (Safe 1st)	N/A
Red	Ava	3 points (Safe 1st)	N/A
Red	Annie	3 points (Safe 1st)	N/A
Red	Jessica	3 points (Safe 1st)	N/A
Blue	Luca	3 points (Safe 2nd)	N/A
Blue	Zachary	3 points (Safe 2nd)	N/A
Blue	Zeke	3 points (Safe 2nd)	N/A
Blue	Tristan	3 points (Safe 2nd)	N/A
Yellow			N/A
Yellow	Max	1 point (last place)	Passed
Yellow	Josie	1 point (last place)	Failed
Yellow	Rory	1 point (last place)	Failed
Yellow	Hanna	1 point (last place)	Passed

=== Episode 6 (20 August) ===
The spellers take on the spell gate again to compete in Speed Spell Duo.

Team	Spellers	Results	
Team	Spellers	Speed Spell Duo	Spelling Bee
Blue
Blue	Annie	11 points (Safe 1st)	N/A
Blue	Zoe	11 points (Safe 1st)	N/A
Red			N/A
Red	Ava	11 points (Safe 2nd)	N/A
Red	Zachary	11 points (Safe 2nd)	N/A
Yellow	Jessica	10 points (Safe 3rd)	N/A
Yellow	Zeke	10 points (Safe 3rd)	N/A
Green	Hanna	10 points (4th Place)	Passed
Green	Luca	10 points (4th Place)	Failed
Pink	Max	8 points (Last Place)	Failed
Pink	Tristan	8 points (Last Place)	Passed

=== Episode 7 (27 August) ===
The spellers compete in a new challenge Laser Letters. This involves the identification of a spelling mistake and spelling it correctly in order to get a point. The first two teams to get 3 points will be safe. The 2 teams that didn't achieve 3 points will go to the Spelling Bee, where 2 contestants will be eliminated.

Team	Spellers	Results	
Team	Spellers	Laser Letters	Spelling Bee
Yellow
Yellow	Ava	3 points (Safe 1st)	N/A
Yellow	Zoe	3 points (Safe 1st)	N/A
Green			N/A
Green	Annie	3 points (Safe 2nd)	N/A
Green	Zachary	3 points (Safe 2nd)	N/A
Red	Hanna	2 points (3rd)	Failed
Red	Tristan	2 points (3rd)	Passed
Blue	Jessica	0 points (Last Place)	Failed
Blue	Zeke	0 points (Last Place)	Passed

=== Episode 8 (3 September) ===
The spellers compete for a second time in Superword.

Spellers	Results	
Spellers	Superword	Spelling Bee
Zachary	5 Points (Safe 1st)	N/A
Annie	5 points (Safe 2nd)	N/A
Zoe	4 points (3rd)	Failed
Tristan	3 points (4th)	Passed
Zeke	2 points (5th)	Passed
Ava	1 point (Last Place)	Passed

=== Episode 9 (10 September) ===
The spellers take on the spell gate again to compete in Speed Spell Showdown.

Spellers	Results	
Spellers	Speed Spell Showdown	Spelling Bee
Ava	13 points (Safe 1st)	N/A
Zeke	12 points (2nd)	Failed
Annie	11 points (3rd)	Passed
Tristan	11 points (4th)	Passed
Zachary	10 Points (Last Place)	Passed

=== Episode 10 (17 September) ===
The Spellers compete in Letter by Letter Knock-Out. Tristan went on to win the Final Spelling Bee, his winning word was "centrifuge".

Spellers	Results	
Spellers	Letter by Letter Knock-Out	Final Spelling Bee
Tristan	Won Round 3 (Progressed 3rd)	Winner
Zachary	Won Round 2 (Progressed 2nd)	Runner-up
Annie	Won Round 1 (Progressed 1st)	3rd
Ava	Lost Round 3 (Eliminated 4th)	N/A (already eliminated)

== Ratings ==
Colour key:
Highest rating episode during the series
Lowest rating episode during the series

Episode		Airdate	Timeslot	Viewers (Millions)	Rank (Night)	Source
1	"Episode One"	17 July 2016	Sunday 6:30 pm	0.476	#13	
2	"Episode Two"	24 July 2016	Sunday 6:30 pm	0.495	#11	
3	"Episode Three"	31 July 2016	Sunday 6:30 pm	0.373	#16	
4	"Episode Four"	7 August 2016	Sunday 6:30 pm	0.298	#20	
5	"Episode Five"	13 August 2016	Saturday 7:00 pm	—N/a	<#20	
6	"Episode Six"	20 August 2016	Saturday 6:30 pm	—N/a	<#20	
7	"Episode Seven"	27 August 2016	Saturday 6:30 pm	—N/a	<#20	
8	"Episode Eight"	3 September 2016	Saturday 6:30 pm	—N/a	<#20	
9	"Episode Nine"	10 September 2016	Saturday 6:30 pm	—N/a	<#20	
10	"Episode Ten"	17 September 2016	Saturday 6:30 pm	—N/a	<#20	
