= Logie Awards of 2011 =

Australian television awards

53rd Logie Awards
- Date: 1 May 2011
- Site: Crown Palladium, Melbourne, Victoria
- Hosted by: Shane Bourne

Highlights
- Gold Logie: Karl Stefanovic
- Hall of Fame: Laurie Oakes
- Most awards: Underbelly: The Golden Mile (3)
- Most nominations: Packed to the Rafters (15)

Television coverage
- Network: Nine Network

The 53rd Annual TV Week Logie Awards was held on Sunday 1 May 2011 at the Crown Palladium in Melbourne, and broadcast on the Nine Network. The ceremony was hosted by Shane Bourne, while the red carpet arrivals was hosted by Shelley Craft, Livinia Nixon, James Mathison and Jules Lund. Musical performers at the event were Katy Perry, Maroon 5 and Jessie J. It was the last Logies ceremony to have a host until 2023.

== Winners and nominees ==
In the tables below, winners are listed first and highlighted in bold.

=== Gold Logie ===
Most Popular Personality on Australian Television
- **Karl Stefanovic in Today (Nine Network)**
  - Rebecca Gibney in Packed to the Rafters (Seven Network)
  - Adam Hills in Spicks and Specks (ABC1)
  - Asher Keddie in Offspring and Hawke (Network Ten)
  - Jessica Marais in Packed to the Rafters (Seven Network)
  - Chrissie Swan in The Circle (Network Ten)

=== Acting/Presenting ===
Most Popular Actor	Most Popular Actress
**Hugh Sheridan in Packed to the Rafters (Seven Network)**; Michael Caton in Packed to the Rafters (Seven Network); Don Hany in Offspring (Network Ten) and Tangle (Showcase); Callan Mulvey in Rush (Network Ten); Erik Thomson in Packed to the Rafters (Seven Network)	**Asher Keddie in Offspring (Network Ten)**; Rebecca Gibney in Packed to the Rafters (Seven Network); Jessica Marais in Packed to the Rafters (Seven Network); Margot Robbie in Neighbours (Network Ten); Zoe Ventoura in Packed to the Rafters (Seven Network)
Most Outstanding Actor in a Series	Most Outstanding Actress in a Series
**Richard Roxburgh in Rake (ABC1)**; Jason Gann in Wilfred (SBS); Richard Roxburgh in Hawke (Network Ten); Erik Thomson in Packed to the Rafters (Seven Network); Hugh Sheridan in Packed to the Rafters (Seven Network)	**Claire van der Boom in Sisters of War (ABC1)**; Justine Clarke in Tangle (Showcase); Asher Keddie in Offspring (Network Ten); Catherine McClements in Rush (Network Ten); Kat Stewart in Offspring (Network Ten)
Most Popular New Male Talent	Most Popular New Female Talent
**Firass Dirani in Underbelly: The Golden Mile (Nine Network)**; Ryan Corr in Packed to the Rafters (Seven Network); Charles Cottier in Home and Away (Seven Network); Manu Feildel in My Kitchen Rules (Seven Network); Eddie Perfect in Offspring (Network Ten)	**Chrissie Swan in The Circle (Network Ten)**; Emma Booth in Underbelly: The Golden Mile (Nine Network); Julie Goodwin in Home Cooked! With Julie Goodwin (Nine Network); Hannah Marshall in Packed to the Rafters (Seven Network); Poh Ling Yeow in Poh's Kitchen (ABC1)
Most Outstanding New Talent	Most Popular Presenter
**Firass Dirani in Underbelly: The Golden Mile (Nine Network)**; Emma Booth in Underbelly: The Golden Mile (Nine Network); Ryan Corr in Packed to the Rafters (Seven Network); Richard Davies in Offspring (Network Ten); Sarah Snook in Sisters of War (ABC1)	**Karl Stefanovic in Today (Nine Network)**; Hamish Blake in Hamish & Andy Specials (Network Ten); Adam Hills in Spicks and Specks (ABC1); Shaun Micallef in Talkin' 'Bout Your Generation (Network Ten); Chrissie Swan in The Circle (Network Ten)

=== Most Popular Programs ===
Most Popular Drama Series	Most Popular Light Entertainment Program
**Packed to the Rafters (Seven Network)**; Home and Away (Seven Network); Neighbours (Network Ten); Offspring (Network Ten); Rush (Network Ten); Underbelly: The Golden Mile (Nine Network)	**The Circle (Network Ten)**; Good News Week (Network Ten); Hey Hey It's Saturday (Nine Network); Sunrise (Seven Network); Talkin' 'Bout Your Generation (Network Ten)
Most Popular Lifestyle Program	Most Popular Factual Program
**Better Homes and Gardens (Seven Network)**; Domestic Blitz (Nine Network); Getaway (Nine Network); Grand Designs Australia (The LifeStyle Channel); Ready Steady Cook (Network Ten)	**Bondi Rescue (Network Ten)**; Bondi Vet (Network Ten); RPA (Nine Network); Undercover Boss Australia (Network Ten); Who Do You Think You Are? (SBS)
Most Popular Sports Program	Most Popular Reality Program
**The Footy Show (AFL) (Nine Network)**; Before the Game (Network Ten); The Footy Show (NRL) (Nine Network); The Matty Johns Show (Seven Network); Nine's Wide World of Sports (Nine Network)	**MasterChef Australia (Network Ten)**; The Biggest Loser (Network Ten); Dancing with the Stars (Seven Network); The Farmer Wants a Wife (Nine Network); The X Factor (Seven Network)

=== Most Outstanding Programs ===
Most Outstanding Drama Series, Miniseries or Telemovie	Most Outstanding Light Entertainment Program
**Underbelly: The Golden Mile (Nine Network)**; Hawke (Network Ten); Packed to the Rafters (Seven Network); Rake (ABC1); Rush (Network Ten); Sisters of War (ABC1)	**Spicks and Specks (ABC1)**; Hamish & Andy's Caravan of Courage: Great Britain & Ireland (Network Ten); Luke Nguyen's Vietnam (SBS); Talkin' 'Bout Your Generation (Network Ten); Yes We Canberra! (ABC1)
Most Outstanding Sports Coverage	Most Outstanding News Coverage
**The Ashes 2010 First Test – Day One at the Gabba (Nine Network)**; 2010 AFL Grand Final (Seven Network); 2010 Melbourne Cup (Seven Network); Rugby League – 2010 State of Origin – Game One (Nine Network); XIX Commonwealth Games 2010 Delhi (Foxtel)	**"New Zealand Mine Disaster", Seven News (Seven Network)**; "Afghanistan Rocket Attack", Ten News (Network Ten); "Election 2010" (Sky News Australia); "Laurie Oakes Election Leaks", Nine News (Nine Network); "Pakistan Floods", ABC News (ABC1)
Most Outstanding Children's Program	Most Outstanding Public Affairs Report
**Dance Academy (ABC3)**; Camp Orange: Castle Mountain (Nickelodeon); Dead Gorgeous (ABC3); Hi-5 (Nine Network); Prank Patrol (ABC3)	**"Smugglers' Paradise", Four Corners (ABC1)**; "Brothers in Arms", Sunday Night (Seven Network); "The Condemned", Dateline (SBS); "Hey Dad..! Scandal", A Current Affair (Nine Network); "Iraq's Deadly Legacy", Dateline (SBS)
Most Outstanding Factual Program
**Trishna & Krishna: The Quest For Separate Lives (Seven Network)**; Bondi Rescue (Network Ten); Miracle in the Storm (ABC1); RPA (Nine Network); Such is Life: The Troubled Times of Ben Cousins (Seven Network)

== Performers ==
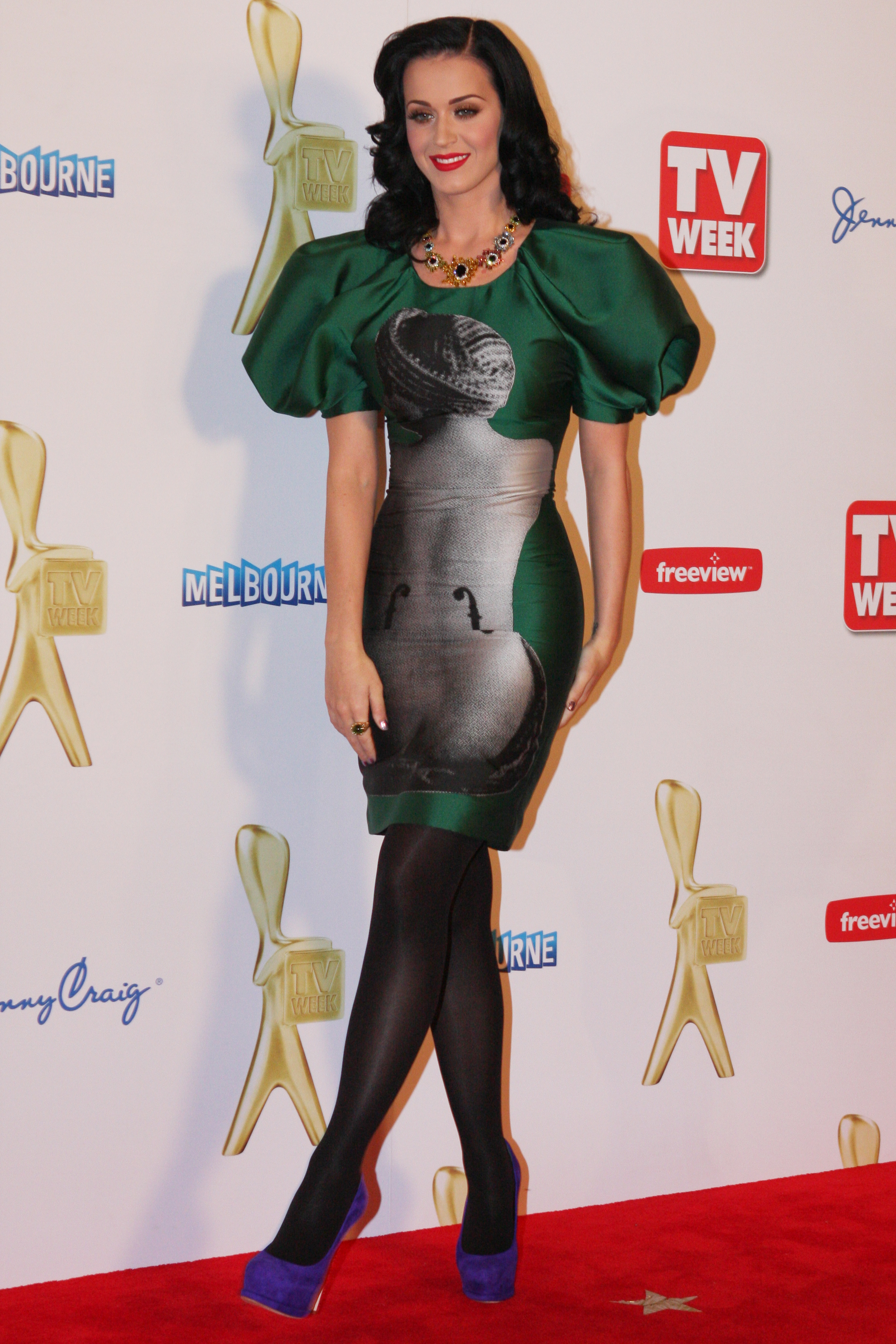
Katy Perry at the 2011 TV Week Logie Awards

- Katy Perry – "Firework"
- Maroon 5 – "Never Gonna Leave This Bed"
- Jessie J – "Price Tag"

== Presenters ==
- Catherine McClements
- Karl Stefanovic
- Peter Stefanovic
- Sarah Murdoch
- Jamie Durie
- Shaun Micallef
- Richard Roxburgh
- Lisa McCune
- Stephen Curry
- Deborah Mailman
- Shane Jacobson
- David Stratton
- Margaret Pomeranz
- Hamish Blake
- Andy Lee
- Chris Lilley
- Adam Hills
- Roy Slaven
- H.G. Nelson
- André Rieu

== In Memoriam ==
The In Memoriam segment was introduced by host Shane Bourne who spoke of the passing of cinematographer John Bowring ACS. Eddie Perfect and the comedy trio Tripod performed Paul Kelly's "Meet Me in the Middle of the Air" a cappella. The following deceased were honoured:

- Geoff Raymond, news presenter
- Sonia Humphrey, journalist
- Michael Meagher, journalist
- Victoria Longley, actress
- Veronica Overton-Low, entertainer
- Bert Shaw, choreographer
- James Dibble, news presenter
- Eric Walters, news presenter
- Edward Bryans, news presenter
- Dame Pat Evison, actress
- Julie Ryles, entertainer
- Michael Schildberger, journalist
- Adriana Xenides, hostess
- Esben Storm, producer
- Gus Mercurio, actor
- Malcolm Douglas, adventurer
- Murray Nicoll, journalist
- Paulene Terry-Beitz, actress
- Blair Milan, actor
- James Elliott, actor
- Ted Dunn, creator Fredd Bear
- Rex Heading OAM, producer
- Norman Hetherington OAM, puppeteer
- Dame Joan Sutherland OM, opera singer
