= The Great Australian Spelling Bee season 1 =

The Great Australian Spelling Bee
- Season 1
- No. of episodes: 12

Release
- Original network: Network Ten
- Original release: 3 August – 8 September 2015

Season chronology
- Next → Season 2

The first season of The Great Australian Spelling Bee premiered on Network Ten on 3 August 2015. The season was hosted by Grant Denyer and Chrissie Swan, and also starred Chris Edmund as pronouncer.

Anirudh won the season, receiving a $50,000 education scholarship, $10,000 worth of equipment for his school, a Macquarie Dictionary, a Sprout computer, and a HP Pro Slate 8 tablet in prizes. In addition, the five runners-up received scholarships worth $10,000, a HP Pro Slate 8 tablet, and $1,000 of education goods for their school.

== Contestants ==
The series began with 52 contestants aged 8–13 years old which was cut down to the Top 26.

Speller	Top 26	Top 24	Top 20	Top 16	Top 12	Top 8	Final
Anirudh	Safe (speed spell)	Safe (speed spell )	Immune	Immune	Safe (flash cards )	Safe (Letter By Letter)	Champion
Grace D	Safe (Speed Spell)	Safe (Speed Spell)	Safe (Flash Cards)	Safe (Flash Cards)	Immune	Safe (Final Spelling Bee)	2nd
Mica Krzyzanowski	Safe (Speed Spell)	Safe (Speed Spell)	Immune	Safe (Speed Spell)	Safe (Speed Spell)	Safe (Show and Spell)	3rd
Harrison	Safe (flash cards )	Safe (flash cards )	Immune	Immune	Safe (speed spell )	Safe (Letter By Letter)	4th
Harpita	Safe (Flash Cards)	Immune	Safe (Flash Cards)	Safe (Speed Spell)	Safe (Final Spelling Bee)	Safe (Final Spelling Bee)	5th
Marko	Safe (Speed Spell)	Safe (Speed Spell)	Safe (Speed Spell)	Safe (Final Spelling Bee)	Immune	Safe (Show and Spell)	6th
Amelia	Safe (Speed Spell)	Safe (Flash Cards)	Safe (Flash Cards)	Immune	Safe (Flash Cards)	Eliminated	
Peyton	Safe (Flash Cards)	Immune	Safe (Flash Cards)	Immune	Safe (Final Spelling Bee)	Eliminated	
Amanda	Safe (Speed Spell)	Safe (Flash Cards)	Safe (Final Spelling Bee)	Safe (Speed Spell)	Eliminated		
Grace P	Safe (Spell Check)	Safe (Final Spelling Bee)	Safe (Flash Cards)	Safe (Flash Cards)	Eliminated		
Harpith	Safe (Spell Check)	Immune	Safe (Speed Spell)	Safe (Final Spelling Bee)	Eliminated		
Karl	Safe (Spell Check)	Immune	Safe (Speed Spell)	Safe (Speed Spell)	Eliminated		
Aimee	Safe (Speed Spell)	Safe (Flash Cards)	Safe (Flash Cards)	Eliminated			
Holly T	Safe (Spell Check)	Immune	Immune	Eliminated			
Jye	Safe (Flash Cards)	Safe (Final Spelling Bee)	Safe (Final Spelling Bee)	Eliminated			
Stuart	Safe (Final Spelling Bee)	Safe (Flash Cards)	Immune	Eliminated			
Holly R	Safe (Flash Cards)	Safe (Flash Cards)	Eliminated				
Jack B	Safe (Speed Spell)	Safe (Speed Spell)	Eliminated				
Ryan	Safe (Final Spelling Bee)	Immune	Eliminated				
Tej	Safe (Flash Cards)	Safe (Speed Spell)	Eliminated				
Bella	Safe (Speed Spell)	Eliminated					
Ben	Safe (Speed Spell)	Eliminated					
Josie	Safe (Flash Cards)	Eliminated					
Timothy	Safe (Flash Cards)	Eliminated					
Josh	Eliminated						
Jack H	Eliminated						

== Episodes ==
=== Episode 1 ===
This episode consisted of 4 person heats, with 2 in each group winning a spot in the top 26.

=== Episode 2 ===
At the beginning of the episode it was announced that Emma had to quit the competition due to family reasons. Because of this Harpith (as the most successful eliminated contestant) was brought back into the competition. In the first challenge of the season Speed Spell, the spellers had to spell as many words as they could in a limited amount of time. The top 10 spellers would win immunity. The people that won immunity were Ben, Mica, Grace D, Anirudh, Marko, Amanda, Jack B, Amelia, Bella, Aimee in no particular order. In the second competition Speed Spell 1v1 writing competitions happened the winner of the 1v1 would win immunity. In the final competition before the spelling bee the 8 remaining spellers had to see if the word was misspelled if it was then the speller had to spell correctly that word. If they got it right for the misspelled word and spelled the word correctly they would get immunity. The spelling bee lasted 1 round because Jack and Joshua got their words wrong round 1.

=== Episode 3 ===
Team	Spellers	Results		
Team	Spellers	Letter by Letter	Show and Spell	Spelling Bee
Blue	Harrison	7 points (4th)	N/A	
Blue	Mica	7 points (4th)	N/A	
Blue	Amanda	7 points (4th)	N/A	
Blue	Jye	7 points (4th)	N/A	
Blue	Stuart	7 points (4th)	N/A	
Blue	Tej	7 points (4th)	N/A	
Green	Marko	10 points (1st)	Lost Tiebreaker (3rd)	N/A
Green	Grace D	10 points (1st)	Lost Tiebreaker (3rd)	N/A
Green	Bella	10 points (1st)	Lost Tiebreaker (3rd)	N/A
Green	Jack B	10 points (1st)	Lost Tiebreaker (3rd)	N/A
Green	Anirudh	10 points (1st)	Lost Tiebreaker (3rd)	N/A
Green	Timothy	10 points (1st)	Lost Tiebreaker (3rd)	N/A
Red	Holly R	8 points (2nd)	3 points (1st)	7th
Red	Grace P	8 points (2nd)	3 points (1st)	4th
Red	Aimee	8 points (2nd)	3 points (1st)	12th
Red	Amelia	8 points (2nd)	3 points (1st)	5th
Red	Josie	8 points (2nd)	3 points (1st)	11th
Red	Ben	8 points (2nd)	3 points (1st)	2nd
Yellow	Harpith	8 points (2nd)	Won Tiebreaker (2nd)	1st
Yellow	Karl	8 points (2nd)	Won Tiebreaker (2nd)	10th
Yellow	Peyton	8 points (2nd)	Won Tiebreaker (2nd)	9th
Yellow	Holly T	8 points (2nd)	Won Tiebreaker (2nd)	6th
Yellow	Harpita	8 points (2nd)	Won Tiebreaker (2nd)	3rd
Yellow	Ryan	8 points (2nd)	Won Tiebreaker (2nd)	8th

=== Episode 4 ===
At the end of Speed Spell, the Top 6 were deemed safe from elimination. In no particular order, those spellers were Marko, Anirudh, Mica, Tej, Grace D and Jack B. The remaining 12 spellers went head-to-head in Flash Cards, where the theme was technology. The winning spellers, Harrison, Aimee, Amelia, Amanda, Holly R and Stuart were then safe from elimination. In the final spelling bee, 6 spellers spelling in multiple rounds to determine the 2 spellers who would be safe from elimination (Jye and Grace P). The other 4 spellers, Ben, Bella, Timothy and Josie were sent home.

=== Episode 5 ===
In the Final Spelling Bee, Yellow Team was facing defeat against Green Team. It was a three-on-one situation, as Green Team had three members and Yellow Team only had Mica as their last member. However, Mica rallied in an impressive showing to obtain an astounding come-from-behind victory and gain immunity for her team.

Team	Letter By Letter	Show and Spell	Final Spelling Bee
Grace P Tej; Amanda; Jack B Marko	Out	N/A	
Amelia; Ryan; Aimee; Grace D Peyton	In	Out	N/A
Holly R Jye; Harpith; Harpita; Karl	In		Out
Mica; Holly T Harrison; Stuart; Anirudh	In		Win

=== Episode 6 ===
At the end of Speed Spell, the Top 3 were deemed safe from elimination. In no particular order, those spellers were Marko, Karl and Harpith. The remaining 12 spellers went head-to-head in Flash Cards, where the theme was music. The winning spellers, Harpita, Peyton, Aimee, Grace P, Amelia and Grace D were then safe from elimination. In the final spelling bee, 6 spellers spelling in multiple rounds to determine the 2 spellers who would be safe from elimination (Jye and Amanda). The other 4 spellers, Tej, Jack B, Holly R and Ryan were sent home.

=== Episode 7 ===
In the Final Spelling Bee, Blue Team was facing defeat against Yellow Team. It was a two-on-one situation, as Blue Team had two members and Yellow Team only had Karl as their last member. However, Karl was the last person to spelled the word incorrectly. Which means Blue Team along with Amelia won the immunity for the first time.

Team	Letter By Letter	Show and Spell	Final Spelling Bee
Harpith; Aimee; Holly T Marko	Out	N/A	
Stuart; Amanda; Harpita; Grace D	In	Out	N/A
Karl; Mica; Jye; Grace P	In		Out
Anirudh; Amelia; Peyton; Harrison	In		Win

=== Episode 8 ===
At the end of Speed Spell, the Top 4 were deemed safe from elimination. In no particular order, those spellers were Mica, Karl, Harpita and Amanda. The remaining 8 spellers went head-to-head in Flash Cards, where the theme was sweet things. The winning spellers, Grace P and Grace D were then safe from elimination. In the final spelling bee, 6 spellers spelling in multiple rounds to determine the 2 spellers who would be safe from elimination (Harpith and Marko). The other 4 spellers, Holly T, Aimee, Jye and Stuart were sent home.

=== Episode 9 ===
In the Final Spelling Bee, one member of Blue Team and one member of Red Team are facing each other. It was a one-on-one situation, as Blue Team only had Harpita as their last mamber and Red Team only had Grace D as their last member. However, Grace D was the last person to spelled the word correctly. Which means Red Team won the immunity for the first time.

Team	Letter By Letter	Show and Spell	Final Spelling Bee
Mica; Anirudh	Out	N/A	
Amelia; Amanda	Out	N/A	
Harrison; Karl	In	Out	N/A
Harpith; Grace P	In	Out	N/A
Harpita; Peyton	In		Out
Grace D Marko	In		Win

=== Episode 10 ===
At the end of Speed Spell, the Top 2 were deemed safe from elimination. In no particular order, those spellers were Mica and Harrison. The remaining 8 spellers went head-to-head in Flash Cards, where the theme was arts and culture. The winning spellers, Amelia and Anirudh were then safe from elimination. In the final spelling bee, 6 spellers spelling in multiple rounds to determine the 2 spellers who would be safe from elimination (Harpita and Peyton). The other 4 spellers, Karl, Grace P, Harpith and Amanda were sent home.

=== Episode 11 ===
At the end of Show and Spell, the Top 2 were deemed safe from elimination. In no particular order, those spellers were Mica and Marko. The remaining 6 spellers went head-to-head in Letter By Letter, the Top 2 were deemed safe from elimination. In no particular order, those spellers were Anirudh and Harrison. In the final spelling bee, 4 spellers spelling in multiple rounds to determine the 2 spellers who would be safe from elimination (Harpita and Grace D). The other 2 spellers, Peyton and Amelia were sent home.

=== Episode 12 ===
In the final episode, the Top 6 spellers are in the Grand Final, those spellers were Harpita, Grace D, Anirudh, Harrison, Marko, and Mica. Before they head-to-head Speed Spell, they played the game called Dictionary Dash. Harrison was 1st, Mica was 2nd, Grace D was 3rd, Anirudh was 4th, Marko was 5th, and Harpita was 6th. At the end of Speed Spell, the Top 2 were through to the Ultimate Spelling Bee. In no particular order, those spellers were Grace D and Anirudh. The remaining 4 spellers went head-to-head in Letter By Letter. In the first round, Marko was the 1st speller out in Round 1 after spelling Entrepreneurial wrong. Mica was also the 2nd speller out in Round 1 after spelling Anthropomorphosis wrong. And Harpita was also the last speller out in Round 1 after spelling Concientiousness wrong. Harrison was the 3rd person to go through to the Ultimate Spelling Bee. But suddenly in the 2nd round, Marko was the 1st speller to get eliminated after he spelled Baccalaureate wrong and leaves the competition, therefore he came in 6th place. And Harpita was also the 2nd speller to get eliminated after she spelled Cerebrovascular wrong and leaves the competition, therefore she came in 5th place. Mica was the last person to go through to the Ultimate Spelling Bee. In the final Ultimate Spelling Bee, 4 spellers spelled their words correctly in Round 1 while Harrison spelled Consciousness correctly. Mica also spelled Inconceivable correctly. Anirudh spelled Psychoanalyst correctly. And Grace D spelled Irrecoverable correctly. But unfortunately in Round 2, Harrison spelled Serendipity wrong, and he’s eliminated after Mica spelled Concierge correctly, therefore he came in 4th place. Anirudh struggled the word of Exorbitant, but he spelled it correctly. Grace D was safe from elimination after spelling Geothermal correctly. But in Round 3, Mica spelled Antecedent incorrectly, and she’s eliminated after Anirudh spelled Continuum correctly, therefore she came in 3rd place. Grace D was struggling and unsure of her word Magnanimity, but she spelled her big word correctly that she has never heard of. After 9 rounds, Anirudh and Grace D went head-to-head in Round 10. Anirudh spelled Camaraderie correctly. But unfortunately for Grace D. She spelled Ratatouille incorrectly when she doesn’t know this word. That means she came in 2nd place. And that also means Anirudh has become The Great Australian Spelling Bee Champion for 2015. His school will receive $10,000 worth of educational goods thanks to Woolworths’ earn and learn. He will also receive the Revolutionary New Sprout computer and the Pro Slate 8 thanks to HP. And not only that, he will also take away $50,000 equipment scholarship with a thanks to the Commonwealth Bank. And lastly, he lifts the trophy high after winning The Great Australian Spelling Bee Champion for 2015.

== Ratings ==
Colour key:
Highest rating episode during the series
Lowest rating episode during the series

The Great Australian Spelling Bee (season 1) overnight ratings, with metropolitan viewership and nightly position
Episode		Original airdate	Timeslot approx.	Viewers (Millions)	Rank (Night)	Source
1	"Episode One"	3 August 2015	Monday 7:30 pm	0.921	#7	
2	"Episode Two"	4 August 2015	Tuesday 7:30 pm	0.801	#8	
3	"Episode Three"	10 August 2015	Monday 7:30 pm	0.655	#16	
4	"Episode Four"	11 August 2015	Tuesday 7:30 pm	0.642	#12	
5	"Episode Five"	17 August 2015	Monday 7:30 pm	0.662	#16	
6	"Episode Six"	18 August 2015	Tuesday 7:30 pm	0.616	#16	
7	"Episode Seven"	24 August 2015	Monday 7:30 pm	0.665	#16	
8	"Episode Eight"	25 August 2015	Tuesday 7:30 pm	0.589	#16	
9	"Episode Nine"	31 August 2015	Monday 7:30 pm	0.639	#19	
10	"Episode Ten"	1 September 2015	Tuesday 7:30 pm	0.624	#14	
11	"Episode Eleven"	7 September 2015	Monday 7:30 pm	0.662	#16	
12	"Grand Final"	8 September 2015	Tuesday 7:30 pm	0.755	#11	
12	"Winner Announced"	8 September 2015	Tuesday 7:30 pm	0.901	#7	
