= Denise (TV program) =

Australian morning show television series

- Genre: morning show
- Presented by: Denise Drysdale
- Country of origin: Australia
- Original language: English
- No. of seasons: 4

Production
- Running time: 60 minutes

Original release
- Network: Seven Network
- Release: 20 April 1998 – 21 September 2001

Denise is an Australian morning show television series that aired on the Seven Network from 1998 until 2001. It was hosted by Denise Drysdale.
