= Magdalena Roze =

Australian meteorologist and journalist

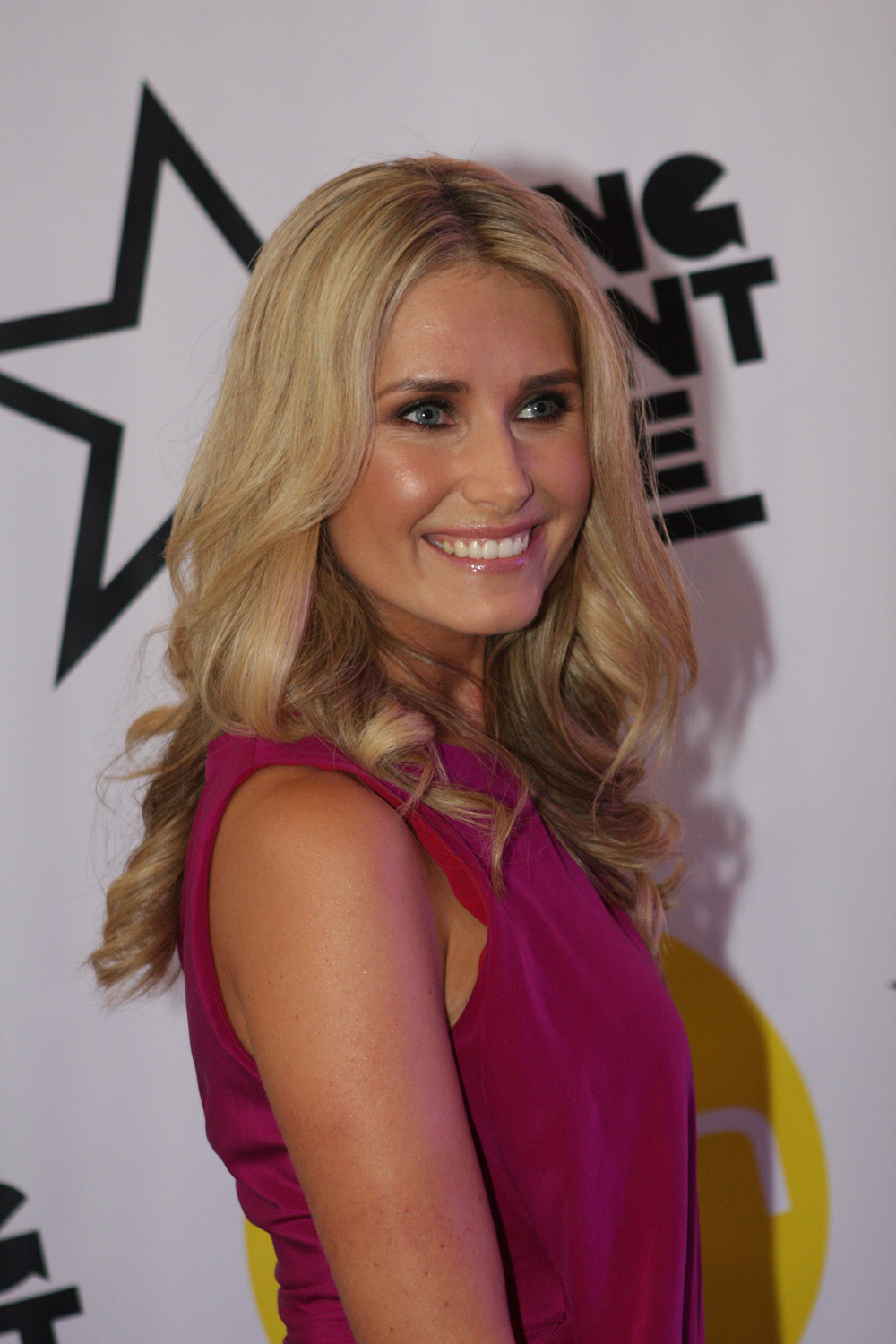
- Roze at the Young Talent Time launch, January 2012
- Born: 1982 (age 43–44); Australia
- Education: James Ruse Agricultural High School, Sydney University
- Occupations: Journalist & meteorologist

Magdalena Roze (born 1982) is an Australian meteorologist, weather presenter and journalist who grew up in Greenacre. She also danced with Lajkonik Sydney and performed in PolArt Adelaide 1994. Roze has presented the weather for Network Ten on Ten News at Five: Weekend and Breakfast.

== Early life ==
Roze was a scholarship holder and graduate from the University of Sydney where she completed a Bachelor of Arts in Media and Communication. In addition to her media qualification, Roze completed a Graduate Diploma in Atmospheric Science at Macquarie University, winning the 2009 Biophysical Environments Prize and the Australian Meteorological and Oceanographic Society Prize for her academic achievements.

She has also completed a meteorological training course at the Bureau of Meteorology and been invited back to Macquarie University as a guest lecturer.

== Career ==
Roze has been an anchor, weather presenter and meteorologist at the Weather Channel and guest appearances as a weather expert and commentator on prime time radio and television programs across Australia.

Roze joined Network Ten in October 2011 and became a weather presenter on Ten News at Five: Weekend.

In January 2012, Roze joined Network Ten's Breakfast as weather presenter. She broadcast from London during the 2012 London Olympics. She was the weather presenter on Ten Morning News from August 2012.

Roze filled in as the newsreader on Ten Morning News and guest co-hosted The Project.

In March 2014, Roze's contract was not renewed by Network Ten.

In August 2014, Roze appeared on Sunrise, on the Kochie's Angels segment.

In February 2015, Roze made an appearance presenting weather on ABC News Victoria. Whether she has secured a contract with a network is unclear yet.

== Personal life ==
In January 2015, Roze announced that she was engaged to partner Darren Robertson. The couple have two sons.
