= The Circle (TV program) =

Australian morning talk show

- Genre: Morning show
- Presented by: Yumi Stynes (2010–2012); Gorgi Coghlan (2010–2012); Chrissie Swan (2010–2011); Denise Drysdale (2010–2011)
- Country of origin: Australia
- Original language: English
- No. of seasons: 3
- No. of episodes: 582

Production
- Producer: Pam Barnes
- Production locations: Melbourne, Victoria
- Running time: 150 mins per episode (inc. commercials)

Original release
- Network: Network Ten
- Release: 9 February 2010 – 3 August 2012

The Circle is an Australian morning talk show that aired on Network Ten from 9 February 2010 to 3 August 2012. The show was presented by Gorgi Coghlan, Yumi Stynes, Chrissie Swan and Denise Drysdale and aired in a daytime slot on Network Ten.

Ten cancelled the program on 30 July 2012, with the last episode on 3 August 2012.

== Presenters ==
Presenter	Years
Chrissie Swan	2010–2011
Denise Drysdale	2010–2011
Yumi Stynes	2010–2012
Gorgi Coghlan	2010–2012

Colin Lane replaced Coghlan in early 2011 while she was on maternity leave. In August and September 2011, Swan took maternity leave, with various guest hosts (including Lane) taking her role during that time.

== History ==
The show was announced on 16 January 2010 as a replacement for the network's previous morning show, 9am with David & Kim and debuted 9 February 2010. Denise Drysdale and Chrissie Swan were part of the original hosting team. After two years with the program they resigned at the end of 2011 season with Drysdale spending more time with family following the birth of her grandson and Swan announced her decision to move to the Australian Radio Network to join Mix 101.1. Swan and Drysdale returned for the show's 500th episode in 2012 to reminisce. They also appeared in the show's final episode.

The Circle originally followed Ten Morning News (which aired from 9:00 am to 10:00 am on weekdays) and occupied the 10:00 am to 12:00 pm slot. The first guest on the show was singer and Australian Idol first season winner Guy Sebastian.

On 29 April 2011, a primetime edition of the program was broadcast as part of Ten's coverage of the Wedding of Prince William and Catherine Middleton.

In 2012, The Circle aired in the 9:00 am to 11:30 am slot.

Ten cancelled the series due to financial costs. The final episode was broadcast 3 August 2012. From 6 August 2012, Ten's weekday lineup began from 8:30 am with The Talk, Entertainment Tonight and The Insider under the title Mornings on Ten.

== Segments ==
The Circle included a mix of lifestyle, cooking and interview segments along with advertorials. It was taped in front of a live studio audience in Melbourne. The advertorials were for products from home-shopping companies such as Danoz Direct and Global Shop Direct.

- Book Club: Cheryl Akle
- Celebrity and Hollywood Entertainment News: Richard Clune
- Gardening: Melissa King
- Cooking: Various chefs
- Movie reviews: Marc Fennell
- Roving reporters: Sean Lynch and Aleisha McCormack
- Sport: Lehmo
- Fashion: Emily Power
- Steal Her Style: Kate Hopkins
- Style Doctor: Anthea O'Connor
- Music: James Young
- Ten News updates with Ron Wilson (Mon & Tue) and Natarsha Belling (Wed-Fri)
- Internet news: Andrew McClelland's 'World Wide Wonderful'
- Hollywood reporter: Katherine Tulich
- LA Correspondent: Louise Pennell

== The Circle: Summertime ==
During the summer non-ratings period from December to January, a pre-recorded highlights show featuring notable segments from the preceding year was broadcast. Advertorials were still shown.

== Controversies ==
=== Corporal Ben Roberts-Smith controversy ===
Stynes caused controversy on The Circle on 28 February 2012 by commenting on a photo of Victoria Cross and Medal for Gallantry recipient, Corporal Ben Roberts-Smith, in a swimming pool by saying that "He's going to dive down to the bottom of the pool to see if his brain is there." George Negus added to the controversy by making a comment which was interpreted by some as questioning whether Roberts-Smith was "up to it in the sack". Both Stynes and Negus later apologised to Roberts-Smith for their comments. He accepted their apologies. The incident was criticised by the Returned Services League, the Defence Minister, Stephen Smith, and the Parliamentary Secretary for Defence. Big4, APT, SwisseVitamins, Saria Shoes, Yoplait, Hoselink, Mirvac Hotels, Jamaica Blue, Michael Hill Jewellers, Dulux and Mitsubishi dropped sponsorship or pulled advertising from the show, while fashion label Otto Mode continued their sponsorship. Despite the loss of nine sponsors, Channel 10 resisted calls to sack Stynes from the show Telstra sacked Negus as an event host because of his remarks.

Ironically, the controversy came just five days after the debut of the short-lived Breakfast starring controversial kiwi Paul Henry, who has a history of controversial remarks, most notably the "Sir Anand Satyanand" and "Sheila Dikshit" controversies, which led to his resignation from TVNZ.

== Ratings ==
The Circle trailed behind its two rivals Mornings on the Nine Network and The Morning Show on the Seven Network, although the Ben Roberts-Smith controversy and its media coverage has caused ratings of the show to lift slightly.

== Soundtrack ==
=== Music from The Circle ===
Music from The Circle

Soundtrack album by Various artists
- Released: 8 April 2011
- Language: English
- Label: Sony Music Australia

Music from The Circle is a compilation album featuring 38 songs chosen by the hosts of The Circle. The album includes a special song recorded by hosts Denise Drysdale, Chrissie Swan, Yumi Stynes and Gorgi Coghlan titled "Circle Song". The song was written by Stynes and Australian recording artist Clare Bowditch.

==== Track listing ====
===== Disc 1 =====
1. Michael Jackson - Man in the Mirror
2. Prince & The Revolution - Kiss
3. Duran Duran - Hungry Like the Wolf
4. Toto - Africa
5. Foreigner - I Want to Know What Love Is
6. The Doobie Brothers - What a Fool Believes
7. Celine Dion - My Heart Will Go On (Love Theme from Titanic)
8. Bonnie Tyler - Total Eclipse of the Heart
9. Michael Bolton - How Can We Be Lovers?
10. Backstreet Boys - I Want It That Way
11. Mr. Big - To Be With You
12. Spandau Ballet - True
13. Olivia Newton-John - Physical
14. Hot Chocolate - You Sexy Thing
15. Renée Geyer - Say I Love You
16. Boney M. - Rivers of Babylon
17. Mondo Rock - Come Said the Boy
18. Dragon - April Sun in Cuba
19. Violent Femmes - Blister in the Sun

===== Disc 2 =====
1. Eurythmics - Sweet Dreams (Are Made of This)
2. John Farnham - Two Strong Hearts
3. Dire Straits - Romeo and Juliet
4. Chicago - If You Leave Me Now
5. Air Supply - All Out of Love
6. Dolly Parton and Kenny Rogers - Islands in the Stream
7. REO Speedwagon - Keep on Loving You
8. Chris de Burgh - The Lady in Red
9. Daryl Braithwaite - The Horses
10. Ronan Keating - When You Say Nothing at All
11. Cyndi Lauper - True Colors
12. Peter Allen - Tenterfield Saddler
13. Roy Orbison - She's a Mystery to Me
14. Sam Brown - Stop!
15. Carly Simon - You're So Vain
16. Dusty Springfield - Son of a Preacher Man
17. Aretha Franklin - Respect
18. Van Morrison - Brown Eyed Girl
19. Johnny Mathis and Deniece Williams - Without Us
20. The Circle Girls - Circle Song

== Awards and nominations ==
At the 2011 Logie Awards, The Circle won two of its four nominations. The program was awarded Most Popular Light Entertainment Program, while Chrissie Swan won in the Most Popular New Female Talent category. Swan was also nominated for the Gold Logie, and for the Most Popular Presenter category.

At the 2012 Logie Awards, Swan was nominated again for the Most Popular Presenter category.

== See also ==
- List of Australian television series
- Breakfast
- Mornings on Ten
