= The Great Australian Spelling Bee =

2015–2016 Australian TV series

- Genre: Reality
- Presented by: Grant Denyer; Chrissie Swan
- Starring: Chris Edmund
- Country of origin: Australia
- Original language: English
- No. of seasons: 2
- No. of episodes: 22

Production
- Production locations: Sydney, New South Wales
- Running time: 60 minutes
- Production company: Endemol Shine Australia

Original release
- Network: Network Ten (season 1 – season 2, episode 6); Eleven (season 2, episode 7 – episode 10)
- Release: 3 August 2015 – 17 September 2016

The Great Australian Spelling Bee was an Australian reality series on Network Ten. Hosted by Grant Denyer and Chrissie Swan, and produced by Shine Australia, the series premiered from 3 August 2015 until 17 September 2016. The series also stars Chris Edmund as pronouncer.

The series is based on the spelling bee competition whereby contestants are required to spell presented words which vary in their degree of difficulty.

For the first season, the winner received a $50,000 education scholarship, $10,000 worth of equipment for his school, a Macquarie Dictionary, a Sprout computer, and an HP Pro Slate 8 tablet. In addition, the five runners-up received scholarships worth $10,000, an HP Pro Slate 8 tablet, and $1,000 of education goods for their school.

On 19 August 2015, the series was renewed for a second season, which premiered on 17 July 2016.

The Great Australian Spelling Bee was filmed at Fox Studios Australia.

== Series overview ==
Season	Episodes	Originally released		No. of Spellers
Season	Episodes	First released	Last released	No. of Spellers
1	12	3 August 2015	8 September 2015	26
2	10	17 July 2016	17 September 2016	18

== Format ==
=== Individual Challenges ===
==== Dictionary Dash ====
This challenge featured dictionaries, which the competitors must find a word in. The first person to find the word in this challenge would get an advantage in speed spell, which is to select your theme first. The others followed in order of who won dictionary dash in the next rounds.

==== Flash Cards ====
Prior to the challenge, the spellers are introduced to a theme of the words that are going to be spelled for the challenge.

Then the spellers receive a token. The tokens are either red or blue and has a letter spelt from A to all the way to the last letter depending on the number of spellers left. The spellers are then arranged in two lines: blue on one side, red on the other and in order of A, B, C and so on.

The challenge is to spell the word relating to the theme correctly by writing it on a tablet within ten seconds. The speller who spells the word correctly will be through to the next round and the other speller will not be safe. This continues for all pairs. If in any case the pairs spell the word correctly for six rounds, a tiebreaker round will happen. To win, the speller who finishes their word first immediately shows their flash cards to the pronouncer.

==== Letter By Letter Knock Out Mode ====
Normal Letter By Letter rules apply, except spellers are not in teams, and if you make a mistake, you're out of the round.

==== Show And Spell Individual Edition ====
Normal Show And Spell rules apply, except spellers don't earn points for their team, they do for themselves.

==== Speed Spell ====
One by one, spellers must stand inside the spell gate and spell as many words as they can in 45/60 seconds. Spelling a word incorrectly will end their turn regardless of time left.

This is usually the first challenge on elimination days. The top spellers, depending on the episode, will be safe from elimination.

==== Spell Check ====
The remaining spellers are required to stand in front of their buzzer while a word is shown on screen. The word may be correct or incorrect in which case if it's incorrect, the speller who buzzes in first is allowed to spell the given word correctly. If correct, the speller is safe. If incorrect, or if the spellers buzzes in at a correct word, they are locked out and they can not spell until a speller is safe. A certain amount of spellers may be safe.

==== Spelling Bee ====
The remaining spellers follow normal Spelling Bee rules. Only two spellers may be safe in every round, while the rest are eliminated.

==== Super Word ====
A square with nine letters is shown on the screen. The spellers find words with more than four letters in the square and it must contain the middle letter. They must press the buzzer and spell the word correctly to get a point. There is also a nine-letter word and it is called the 'Superword'. The speller who finds it and spells it correctly will be safe. A certain amount of spellers may be safe.

=== Team Challenges ===
Spellers choose a coloured token out of a bag in which that colour is the team they are in. In every challenge, one or two teams will be knocked out and cannot get immunity for the next elimination (season 1) or must play spelling bee to be safe (season 2).

==== Laser Word ====
Four Words are shown on a screen. One of them is misspelled. The competitors must find the misspelled word and spell it correctly to gain a point for their team.

==== Letter By Letter ====
The team members must spell a word, saying a letter one by one in the order they are in. If a speller thinks the speller before them has made an error, they must say 'Next word' to continue with the next word. The team must spell as many words as they can within 90 seconds.

==== Show and Spell ====
Like Flash Cards, spellers are introduced to a theme of words the spellers must spell. The words, like Spell Check, are shown on a screen. Unlike Spell Check, all the letters except the 1st letter are not shown, and are replaced with underscores. The competitors must guess the word, following a series of clues, and after they guess, spell it correctly to gain a point for their team.

==== Speed Spell Relay/Speed Spell Duo ====
Normal Speed Spell rules apply, except they are in teams and they must spell one by one. Spelling a word incorrectly will not end their turn, but the speller who spells incorrectly will be knocked out of the challenge.

==== Team Spelling Bee ====
Normal Spelling Bee rules apply. The remaining two teams have their members spell alternating. Spelling a word incorrectly will force the speller to be knocked out of the challenge. The team with spellers still left wins immunity.

==== Team Super Word ====
Normal Super Word rules apply, except the spellers are not in individuals, they are in teams.

== Seasons ==
=== Season One ===
Season one first aired on 3 August 2015 and concluded on 8 September 2015. The season was hosted by Grant Denyer & Chrissie Swan. It was won by Anirudh who received $50,000 education scholarship, $10,000 worth of equipment for his school, a Macquarie Dictionary, An Electriclefied book, a Sprout computer, and a HP Pro Slate 8 tablet.

=== Season Two ===
Season two first aired on 17 July 2016, Grant Denyer & Chrissie Swan both returned as hosts. Poor ratings for the initial episodes of the season saw the series moved from Sundays to the lower viewed Saturday from its fifth episode.

== Viewership ==
Season	Network	Episodes	Premiere			Finale					Ref
Season	Network	Episodes	Premiere date	Premiere ratings	Rank	Finale date	Finale ratings (Grand final)	Rank	Finale ratings (Winner announced)	Rank	Ref
One	Network Ten	12	3 August 2015	0.921	#7	8 September 2015	0.755	#11	0.901	#7	
Two	Network Ten (eps 1-6); Eleven (eps 7-10)	10	17 July 2016	0.456	#12	17 September 2016					

== International adaptations ==
In 2016 there has been a Thai series.

A UK series based on the format will air in the United Kingdom on Sky 1 under the title The Big Spell.
