= Can of Worms (TV program) =

- Genre: Talk show
- Presented by: Chrissie Swan (2012–2013); Dan Ilic (2012–2013); Ian "Dicko" Dickson (2011); Meshel Laurie (2011)
- Country of origin: Australia
- Original language: English
- No. of series: 3
- No. of episodes: 39 (list of episodes)

Production
- Executive producers: Andrew Denton; Paul Leadon; David Wilson
- Producer: Polly Connolly
- Running time: 60 minutes
- Production company: Zapruder's Other Films

Original release
- Network: Network Ten
- Release: 4 July 2011 – 20 May 2013

Can of Worms is an Australian television talk show that was broadcast on Network Ten.

Producer Andrew Denton pitched the show as providing "an insight into what Australia really thinks about controversial topics" by removing "the barriers of political correctness." The first series' host, Ian "Dicko" Dickson, described the show as a "[sitting] between a talk-show and a game-show."

== Production ==
The show first aired on 4 July 2011 until 20 May 2013. Ian "Dicko" Dickson hosted the first series along with Meshel Laurie.

During the production of the first series, TV Tonight reported that some public figures had declined to appear on show. Host Dickson confirmed that the show's premise had led to difficulty booking participants on the early episodes.

Dickson left the show at the end of the first series. The second series, was hosted by Chrissie Swan and 'man on the street' Dan Ilic. It began airing on 20 August 2012, with two 'Best of Specials' airing in November as a two-part finale.

On 23 October 2012, Can of Worms was renewed for a third series that would be broadcast around the nation live. The Third Series (still hosted by Swan and Ilic) began airing on 11 February 2013 and was broadcast live. James Mathison, a former contenstnat, hosted the show whilst Swan was on maternity leave.

Season 1 was filmed at Global Television Studios at the Australian Technology Park in Eveleigh, Sydney. Season 2 moved produced to ABC Studios in Ultimo, Sydney. Season 3 moved production interstate to Melbourne, using studio facilities at the ABC in Elsternwick.

== Format ==
The titular "worms" are yes/no questions about morals, society, responsible parenting, religion, race and various other topics. In each episode, two "worms" are announced and discussed; although this was phased out during the latter half of season 2. By early season 3, there is only one major worm with audience participation and "live" Facebook/Zeebox Australia feeds.

The program features a panel of three public figures, answering questions issues that affect people every day involving political correctness, personal values and the unending capacity to make life complicated. The program is recorded live in front of a studio audience and broadcast on the following night.

Most of the show revolves around the two "worms" of the evening. After three celebrity guests are introduced, the first "worm" is introduced and the guests may choose to respond "Yes" or "No". The guests are asked questions about their response to the worm. The focus is on the studio audience and talks to a few of the members of the audience about their experiences and beliefs in relation to the worm. Afterwards there is results of a Roy Morgan poll of the "worm". The following segment called "Moral Minefield" is similar but a shorter version. There are six categories (two per guest) each of which has a question (similar to a "worm", but not referred to as such). After picking one of the categories, the guest must answer truthfully, and see if it agrees with the studio audiences majority vote. The second "worm" is run similar to the first.

The show encouraged widespread discussion via social media. Viewers could post views by Tweeting using @CanofwormsTV or a specified hashtag, or posting onto the Can of Worms Facebook page. During the discussion of the "worms," Tweets and Facebook posts were included at the bottom of the screen.

== Reception ==
The show debuted on 4 July 2011 with 930,000 viewers, and was the 11th most-watched show of the evening. By its second series, Can of Worms was the 18th most-watched program of the evening, averaging a "metro audience" of 572,000.

In 2012, The Sydney Morning Herald gave the second series a positive review, writing, "It's a show that continues to evolve," and "it reliably delivers honest opinions." Swan was praised for having, "a wonderfully warm, relaxed screen presence." However, it was noted that "the quality varies depending on the guests, and the topics."

== Controversies ==
During the first series, TV Tonight noted Can of Worms "has laid claim to its uncompromising, potentially controversial television," referencing Australian television presenter Don Burke saying "fuck" on the series' second episode.

On the 18 July 2011 episode, former Carlton Football Club President John Elliott caused controversy by referring to Indigenous Australians using the pejorative "abos." Elliott apologized, but he and the show faced backlash on social media. TV Tonight pointed out that Can of Worms was pre-taped and questioned if the slur should have made it to air.

During the second series, conservative political activist group CANdo: Australia's Voice started an online petition against the show after contestant James Mathison made crude, comedic remarks about conservative broadcaster Alan Jones on the 8 Oct 2012 episode. The petition sought a retraction from Mathison and wanted the show to be canceled. Network Ten declined both requests, saying the network had complied with broadcasting regulations and "carried appropriate warnings about potentially offensive behaviour."
