= Kathryn Eisman =

Australian author and television personality

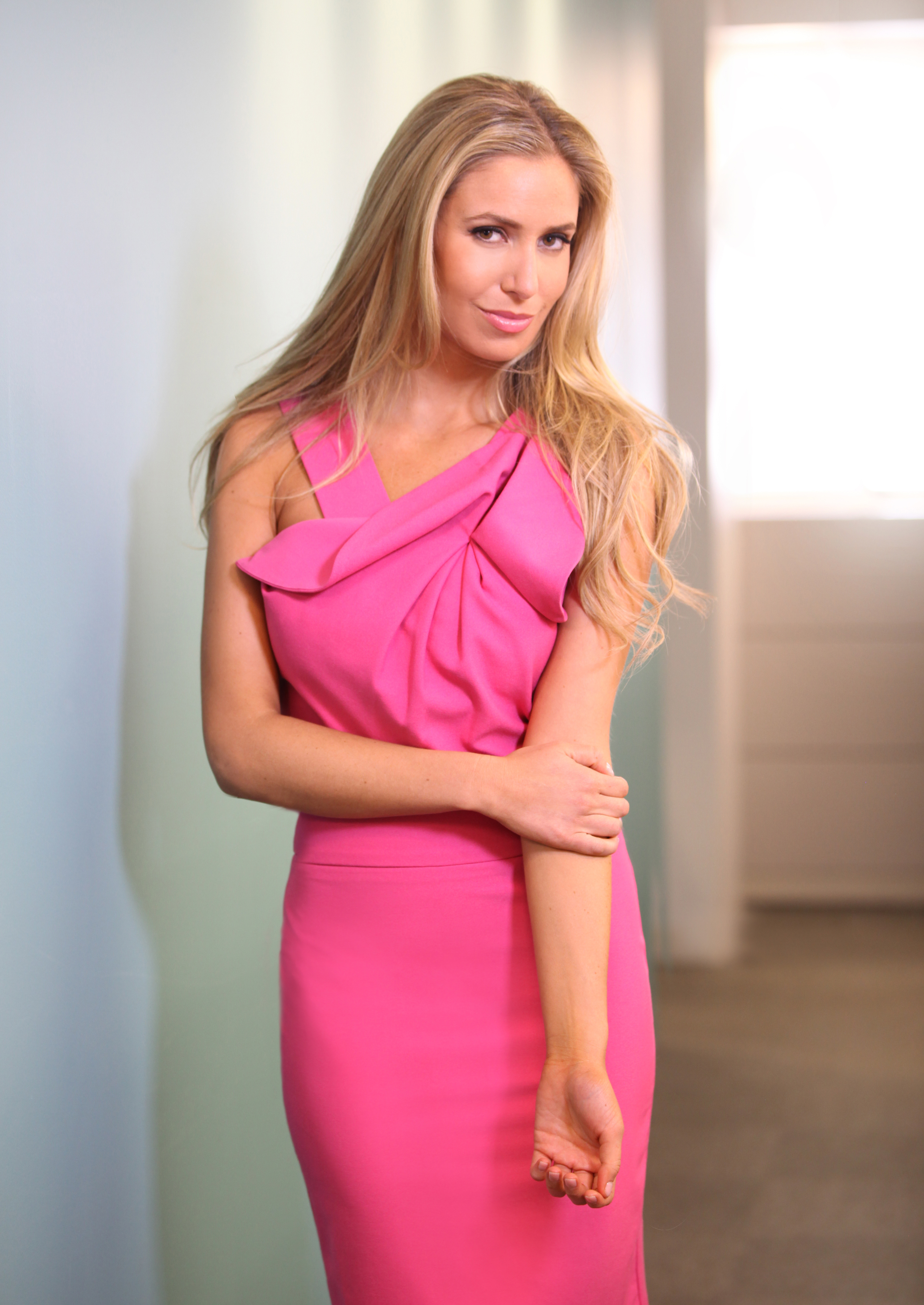
- Kathryn Eisman at Rockefeller Centre, 2012
- Born: 14 June 1981 (age 45); Australia
- Education: University of Technology, Sydney
- Occupations: Television personality; Author
- Years active: 1999–present
- Known for: The TODAY Show; Sunrise; Undressed
- Spouse: Simon Reynolds
- Children: 2
- Parents: Peter Eisman (father); Silvia Eisman (mother)
- Relatives: John Eisman; Anna Reich
- Website: Official website

Kathryn Eisman (born 14 June 1981) is an Australian fashion, lifestyle and entertainment television journalist, author, model and designer. She was part of the two-time Emmy nominated E! News Entertainment team, was the entertainment correspondent for Sunrise on the Seven Network, and the author of two books. She is the founder of High Heel Jungle Socks. Eisman hosted and co-executive produced the wardrobe makeover series Undressed on Paramount+, which premiered on 6 October 2022. Kathryn is daughter of Peter and Sylvia Eisman, a Sydney based pediatrician and an educator, respectively. She is niece of John Eisman, who was honoured with the Order of Australia. and granddaughter of Anna Reich, the last known holocaust survivor from Sydney to have been in Schindler's List. She later went to Australia where she became a fashion identity, philanthropist and businesswoman.

== Career ==
Eisman holds a Bachelor in Communications from the University of Technology Sydney and has worked in different TV shows and media outlets in Australia and the US. She was the lifestyle reporter for WNBC's TODAY In New York and also reported for Live at 5 news cast and was the host of WNBC's Behind the scenes: Made in NY. Eisman was the Head of Fashion and Lifestyle content in E! News. and hosted television shows, including 'The Timid Girls Guide To Life' on The Style Network and "BTS" on NBC and Yahoo's Secrets To Your Success. She is currently the Los Angeles based entertainment reporter for Seven Network's top rating national morning show, Sunrise. She has previously been the LA Correspondent for Channel Ten's Breakfast She is currently LA entertainment reporter for The Morning Show. As a reporter and host, she has interviewed actors and pop culture personalities like Oprah, Borat, Beyoncé, Oscar de la Renta, Matt Damon or Cameron Diaz. Recently, she was a Senior Producer for the ABC/Disney's nationally syndicated talk show FABLife.

Eisman is the host and co-executive producer of wardrobe makeover transformation television series Undressed, which was released on Paramount+ on 6 October 2022. The first episode also premiered as a preview episode on sister-channel Network 10 and video on demand service 10 Play on the release date. The program was the first unscripted series produced by Made Up Stories', Bruna Papandrea, Steve Hutensky and Jane Cho, alongside co-producer Eden Gaha.

Eisman is a regular contributor to NBC's TODAY Show, Good Morning America, Fox News's The O'Reilly Factor, Channel 7, Channel Ten, ABC News Now, MSNBC, KTLA, E! News and The Style Network, and has had different articles published in Marie Claire, Vogue, The New York Times, and has written monthly columns for Men's Health and CLEO magazine as well as online blogs in She Knows and Yahoo. Aside from her television career, Eisman is a model who appeared in campaigns for brands as Berlei, Seafolly, Tigerlily or David Jones. She has also modeled for fashion spreads, including Cosmopolitan, Vogue Living, FHM and Sunday Life.

Eisman is also the Founder and Creative Director of High Heel Jungle, a line of high fashion socks.

== Books ==
Eisman is the author of How to Tell a Woman by her Handbag and How to Tell a Man by his Shoes, published in 10 countries and 15 languages. She was the winner of Cosmopolitan's 'Fun, Fearless Female of the Year' award in 2009.

== Charitable work ==
Eisman is an Ambassador for the Prince of Wales Hospital Foundation 'Black Tie for Breast Cancer' Committee and for the Life Changing Experiences organization' 'Sister2Sister' program.

== Personal life ==
In 2011, Eisman married the speaker and entrepreneur Siimon Reynolds. Eisman gave birth to daughters, Capri, in October 2013 and Monet, in March 2018. The family currently resides in Los Angeles.
