= Gorgi Coghlan =

Australian television presenter and performer

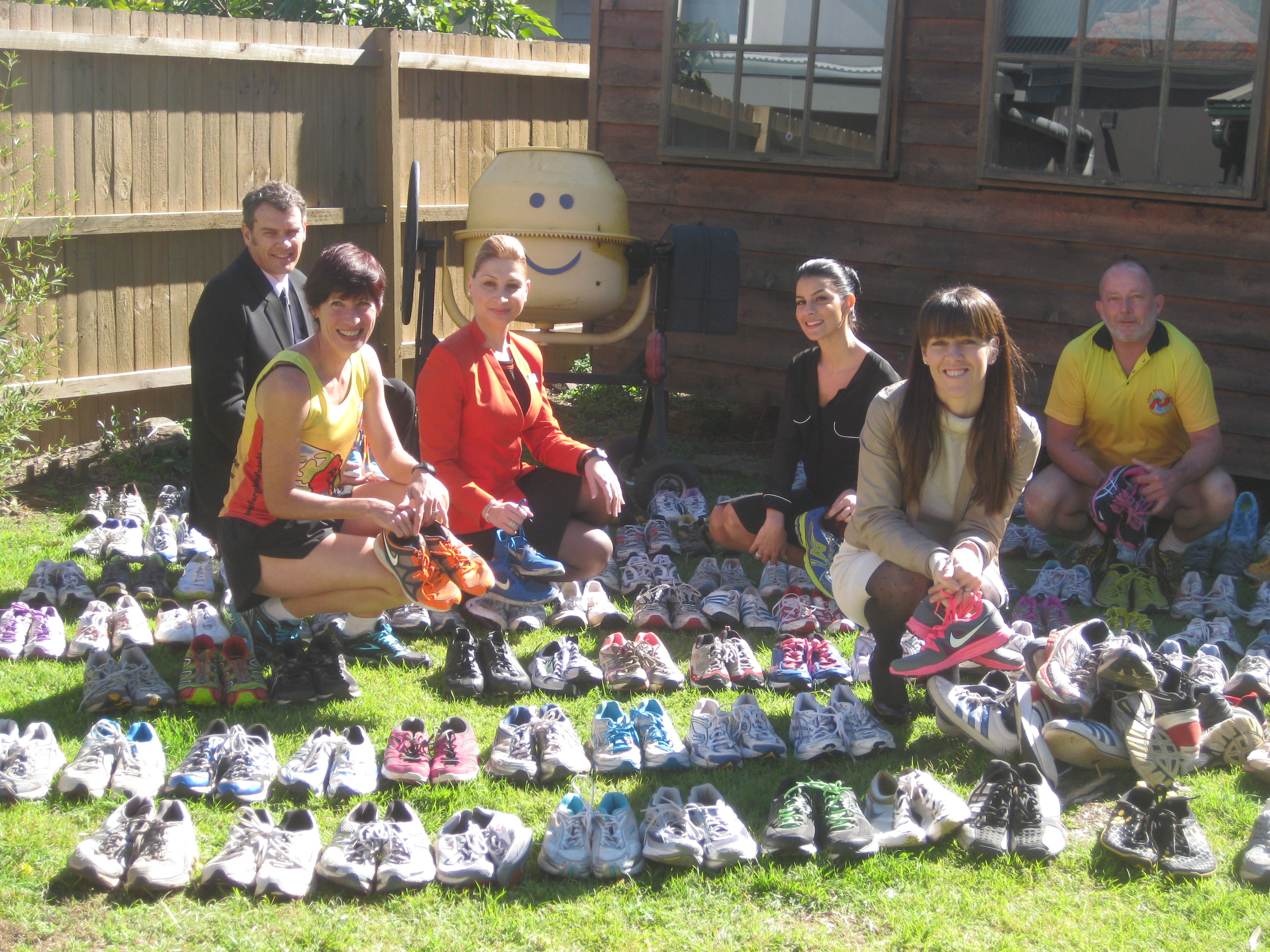
- Gorgi Coghlan (second from right) with members of Flying Start Australia's Shoes for Planet Earth program
- Born: Georgina Rendell; 18 August 1975 (age 51); Warrnambool, Victoria
- Education: St. Anne's Ladies College
- Occupations: Television presenter; reporter; journalist; singer; former state-level equestrian
- Years active: 2004–present
- Known for: Presenter on The Circle; 10 years as a panellist on The Project
- Notable work: Today as reporter and travel presenter; National Nine News Melbourne as reporter
- Spouse: Simon Coghlan (m. 2009)
- Children: 1

Georgina Coghlan (née Rendell; born 18 August 1975) is an Australian television presenter and performer who is best known for co-hosting Network Ten's Logie Award-winning The Circle between 2010 and 2012, as well as being a regular panelist on The Project.

== Personal life ==
Coghlan grew up in Warrnambool, Victoria. on a sheep farm. She was educated in Warrnambool at both St Ann's Ladies College and Emmanuel College and is a former State level equestrian competitor in eventing and dressage. Coghlan also has a Graduate Diploma in Secondary Education, specialising in Biology and Science, and a Bachelor in Science, and worked as a teacher at McKinnon Secondary College.

Gorgi was previously married to lawyer Justin Quill. In October 2009, she married Ballarat businessman Simon Coghlan. In July 2010, Coghlan announced on The Circle that she was pregnant with her first baby and she gave birth to a daughter on 30 December 2010.

== Career ==
Prior to joining Network Ten Coghlan was the Melbourne reporter and travel presenter for Today and for National Nine News on the Nine Network. Coghlan joined Today in 2004 after working on programmes for community television station Channel 31 in Melbourne. Coghlan worked at Channel 31 on the news and current affairs program C News in Melbourne, where she presented the news and worked as a reporter.

During her time at the Nine Network, she was also the Melbourne reporter for National Nine News Early Edition and worked as a reporter on National Nine News in Melbourne. She has also filled in presenting the weather on Today for Steven Jacobs. She resigned from Today in December 2008.

In 2010, Network Ten announced Coghlan as host of the new morning show The Circle alongside Denise Drysdale, Yumi Stynes and Chrissie Swan. Coghlan is also a fill-in presenter for Carrie Bickmore on The Project. Colin Lane replaced Coghlan on The Circle whilst she was on maternity leave. She was also a weekly radio social commentator on 3AW Afternoons with Denis Walter.

In addition to her teaching and television careers, Coghlan is a trained professional singer and has appeared in numerous professional musicals and televised concerts. She has had parts in the long running Queen musical "We Will Rock You", "Carols By Candlelight" (2006, 2007 & 2008) and the Nine Network's The Singing Bee and ABBAMANIA. As Gorgi Quill, she released a solo album, Edward, on CD (Sound Vault Records, SV0535) dedicated to her late grandfather, who inspired her love of singing and music.

In February 2015, Coghlan was announced as Carrie Bickmore's replacement on The Project during Carrie's maternity leave. She has previously been a panelist and fill-in host. Coghlan announced on 27 July 2021 that she would be stepping away from the show after 10 years.

In 2019, Coghlan was revealed to be the 'Monster' on The Masked Singer Australia and was placed third on the show.

Coghlan has been a regular fill-in presenter on ABC Radio Melbourne, hosting Breakfast, The Conversation Hour, Afternoons and The Friday Revue.
