= Bert Shaw =

English footballer

Personal information
- Full name: Herbert Shaw
- Date of birth: 1919
- Place of birth: Sheffield, England
- Position: Winger

Senior career*
Years	Team	Apps	(Gls)
1934–1935	Broadway Amateurs		
1935–1936	Dronfield Town		
1936–1937	Boston United		
1937–1939	Grimsby Town	15	(3)
1939	Chelmsford City		
- * Club domestic league appearances and goals

Herbert Shaw (born 1919) was an English professional footballer who played as a winger.
