= Dig We Must =

Australian music television show (1966)

Dig We Must was an Australian music television show broadcast by the ABC in 1966. Hosted by Bobby & Laurie it began on August 26. The half hour show was produced by Barry Langford and aimed at a teenage audience. Filmed in Melbourne it featured a 14-piece band, dancers and guest singers mixed in with comedy sketches. Monitor in The Age called it an "essay on erotic". Valda Marshall of The Sydney Morning Herald said it relied "too heavily on the same tired old formula" of other shows like Hullabaloo.

== See also ==
- List of Australian music television shows
- List of Australian television series
