= Chrissie Swan =

Australian television and radio presenter

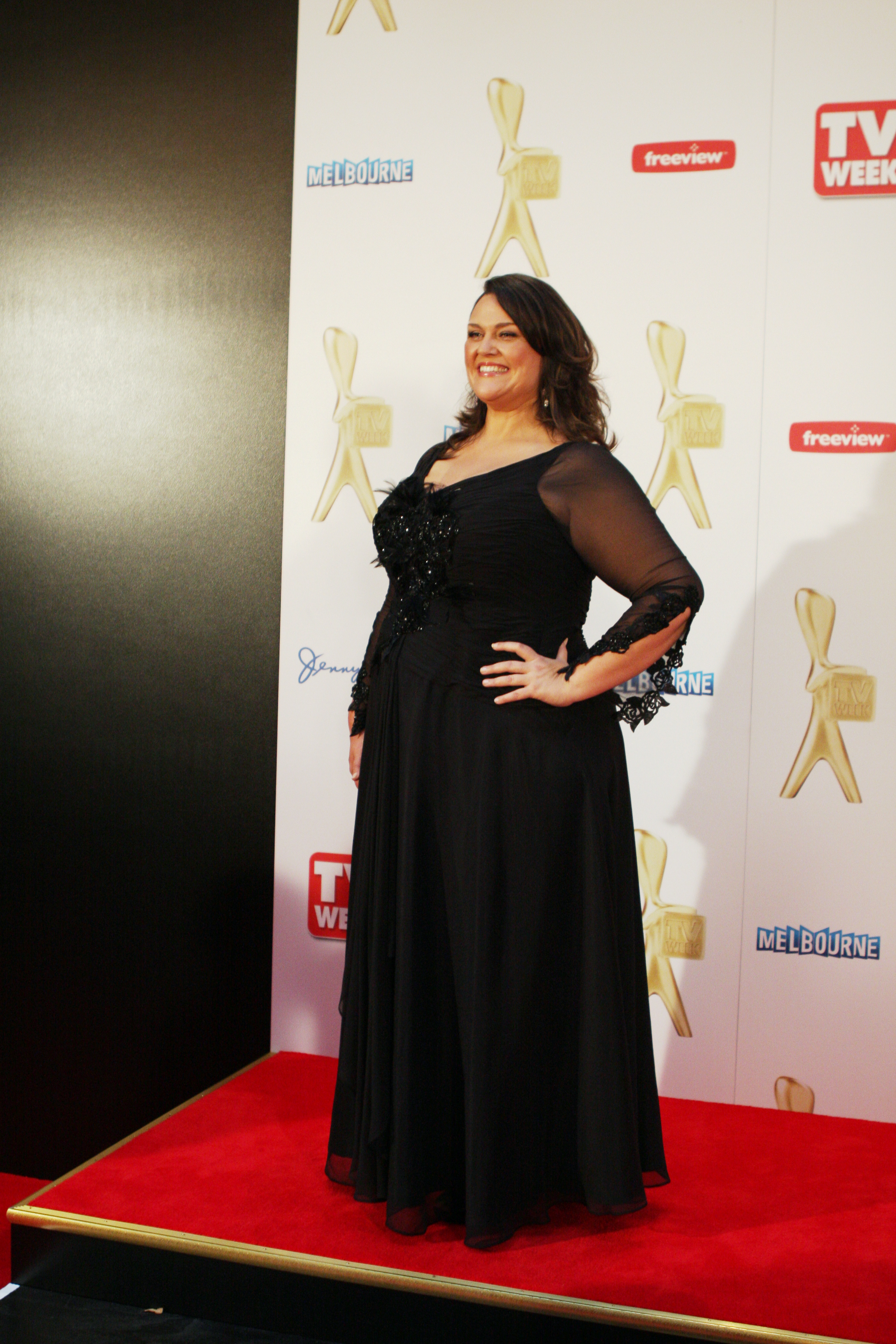
- Swan in May 2011
- Born: Christina Swan; Melbourne, Victoria, Australia
- Education: Sacré Cœur School
- Occupations: Television and radio presenter, media personality
- Years active: 2003–present
- Employer: Nova
- Partner: Chris Saville (2006–21)
- Children: 3
- Awards: Logie Award for Most Popular New Female Talent (2011)

Christina Swan is an Australian television and radio presenter and media personality. She currently hosts the national afternoon radio show The Chrissie Swan Show on Nova, and the weekly lifestyle program Healthy, Wealthy and Wise on the Seven Network.

== Career ==
=== Television ===
Her primary career was in copywriting before appearing on television in 2003 as a contestant on the reality TV series Big Brother, on which she was the runner-up.

In 2010, Network 10 announced Swan as host of the new morning show The Circle alongside Denise Drysdale, Yumi Stynes and Gorgi Coghlan. The same year, she became a spokesperson for Jenny Craig, appearing in national print and television advertisements.

In 2012, she became the host of the second series of Network Ten's Can of Worms, produced by Cordell Jigsaw Zapruder in association with Watercooler Media. In February 2013, Swan returned as host of the third series.

In February 2015, she appeared on the Network Ten show I'm a Celebrity Get Me Out of Here!, finishing in third place.

In August 2015, she appeared as a co-host of The Great Australian Spelling Bee alongside Grant Denyer.

In March 2016, she became co-host of Long Lost Family on Network 10 alongside comedian Anh Do.

In October 2021, she appeared on the Network 10 show Celebrity MasterChef Australia, being first to be eliminated.

In 2022, she hosted the Australian version on the British comedy panel show, Would I Lie to You? Australia, on Network 10. Later in 2022, it was announced that Swan would host a second season of the show set to air in 2023.

In March 2022, Carrie Bickmore said that she would be taking extended leave from The Project and Swan was announced as the fill-in host of the show on Monday nights. Swan began hosting on Monday 4 April.

In June 2022, Network 10 announced on Instagram that Swan would join the panel on The Masked Singer Australia for its fourth season as a replacement for Jackie O. She returned for the show's fifth season in 2023, before it was axed in May 2024.

In September 2025, Swan was announced as the host of a reimagined version of iconic Australian lifestyle show Healthy, Wealthy & Wise on the Seven Network and 7plus. The revival show airs at 7 pm Saturday's on Seven.

=== Radio ===
She sought work with breakfast radio in Queensland in late 2003 where she worked at 91.1 Hot FM with co-host Ronnie Stanton.

She presented the Australian Idol radio show on Nova stations across Australia with Mark Holden and Ian Dickson.

She began work at the Vega 91.5 breakfast show alongside Australian Idol judge Ian Dickson and comedian Dave O'Neil in 2007. However, in November 2009, it was announced that Swan would not be returning to Vega 91.5, due to a cost-cutting measure.

In August 2011, she became co-host of the newly created 3PM Pick-Up on Mix 101.1.

In December 2011, she resigned from The Circle to spend more time with her children and also concentrate on radio. She announced that she would be hosting the breakfast show on Mix 101.1 with Jane Hall and Jamie Row as anchor of the show in 2012.

In October 2015, she was announced as a host of Chrissie, Sam & Browny on Nova 100 with Jonathan Brown and Sam Pang from January 2016. In late 2022, it was announced that Chrissie, Sam & Browny would be ending at the end of the year, seven years after the show kicked off. Following her departure from breakfast radio at the end of 2022, Swan announced that she would be hosting her own radio show, The Chrissie Swan Show, on Nova, commencing in 2023.

=== Other ===
In March 2012, she was announced as an ambassador for CARE Australia, an organization working with and helping individuals and families in some of the poorest communities in the world.

In 2018, she was appointed the 'Queen of Moomba', Melbourne's largest community festival.

In April 2024, Swan announced that she would be starting to record her own podcast from her house, titled The ChrissieCast, which began being produced and released through Nova podcasts in May. Swan hosts the show, with regular appearances from Jane Hall, Ash Williams, Dave Thornton and Christie Whelan Brown.

In 2025, Swan published a cookbook that was officially released in October 2025, titled The Shortcut Queen.

== Awards ==
In 2011, she won Most Popular New Female Talent, and was nominated for Most Popular TV Presenter and the Gold Logie for Most Popular Personality on Australian Television at the 2011 TV Week Logie Awards for her hosting role on The Circle.

In 2012 and 2013, she was nominated for the Most Popular Presenter at the Logies for hosting The Circle, and her role on Can of Worms, respectively.

== Personal life ==
She has three children with her former partner of 15 years, Chris Saville, from whom she split in mid-2021.

In 2021, she spoke to media about her lifestyle changes and health goals. As of 2022 she had lost a total of 90 kg (200 lb).
