= Yumi Stynes =

Australian feminist television and radio presenter, podcaster and author

Yumi Tasma Stynes
- Born: Yumi Tasma Stynes; 2 June 1975 (age 51); Swan Hill, Victoria, Australia
- Occupations: Television and radio presenter, author, podcaster
- Years active: 2000–present

Yumi Tasma Stynes (born 2 June 1975) is an Australian feminist podcaster and author. She is the presenter of the ABC Radio podcast Ladies, We Need to Talk about female health and sexuality, and the SBS Audio podcast, SEEN, where she talks with trailblazers from communities outside the mainstream. Between 2010 and 2012, she presented the morning television show The Circle and was previously a television presenter on Channel V Australia and Max. During 2013 she was a presenter on Sydney's Mix 106.5 FM radio breakfast program. A portrait of Stynes by Yoshio Honjo was a finalist for the 2022 Archibald Prize.

== Early life ==
Stynes was born and grew up in Swan Hill, Victoria, Australia. Her mother is Japanese and her father was fifth generation Australian. She spent her teenage years in Melbourne attending Methodist Ladies College in Kew, Victoria before moving to Sydney to work for Channel V Australia.

== Career ==
=== Radio ===
In August 2011, Stynes hosted 3PM Pick-Up with Chrissie Swan, broadcast nationally on Mix 101.1, Mix 106.5, Mix 102.3, Mix 106.3 & 97.3 FM. She remained co-host until August 2012 and was replaced by Jane Hall.

In January 2013, Stynes hosted Mix 106.5's breakfast program with Sami Lukis the first all-female team on FM commercial radio in Sydney.

In January 2017, Stynes joined the KIIS Network to host 3PM Pick-Up with Katie 'Monty' Dimond and Rebecca Judd. She remained co-host until December 2022, when the show was cancelled.

=== Television ===
Stynes's television career began in 2000 as a presenter for Channel V Australia. In 2007, she moved across to MAX where she presented The Know. From 2010 until 2012, Stynes hosted Network Ten's morning show, The Circle.

In 2018 Stynes hosted a documentary on SBS called Is Australia Sexist?

=== Ben Roberts-Smith incident ===
On the 28 February 2012 episode of The Circle, along with George Negus, Stynes made comments about a photo of former soldier Ben Roberts-Smith coming out of a swimming pool, saying, "He's going to dive down to the bottom of the pool to see if his brain is there", while Negus replied in part, "what if [he's] not up to it in the sack?" After tabloid criticism, they personally contacted Roberts-Smith who accepted their apology and agreed there was no malicious intent. Negus said his comments were taken out of context and he was not referring personally to Roberts-Smith.

On 13 September 2014, Fairfax newspapers issued an apology to Stynes and Negus, stating "Our interpretation was wrong and we accept that both Mr Negus and Ms Stynes were not referring to Cpl Roberts-Smith personally." News Limited publications, The Daily Telegraph, Herald Sun and news.com.au also retracted the incorrect allegations.

=== Kerri-Anne Kennerley incident ===
On 28 January 2019, Yumi Stynes appeared as a guest panelist on Studio 10 where discussion included Australia Day protesters who call it Invasion Day. During this Kerri-Anne Kennerley asked "Has any single one of those 5,000 people waving the flags saying how inappropriate the day is, has any one of them been out to the outback where children, where babies and five-year-olds are being raped, their mothers are being raped, their sisters are being raped," to which Stynes responded "That is not even faintly true, Kerri-Anne, and you’re sounding quite racist now."

Later, while speaking on-air with 2GB's Ben Fordham, Kennerley said Stynes "probably misunderstood" her comments. The following day Stynes called in "sick" for a booked appearance on Studio 10, stating on Instagram that it was not related to what happened the day before although she later clarified that "the reason I didn't go on the show is because it's not for me to argue Indigenous rights." She also claimed that she "would have been walking into a trap" if she appeared again on Studio 10 the next day. Stynes instead participated in a radio interview on The Kyle and Jackie O Show, saying "Kennerley has been around forever, she’s like a cockroach, she can’t be extinguished". During that radio interview, the hosts conducted a phone interview with Kennerley to discuss the previous day's argument, before which Stynes described her as "lecturing me about racism".

The ACMA, in its review of the incident noted that "the emphatic and sweeping suggestion by Ms Kennerley of endemic sexual abuse in Indigenous communities could be capable of provoking strong negative feelings in a reasonable person".

=== Podcast ===
Stynes is a writer and host of ABC Radio podcast on female health and sexuality, "Ladies, We Need to Talk".

She also hosts the SBS Audio podcast SEEN, an interview podcast with inspirational and influential Australians who have come from under-represented backgrounds and communities.

=== Publications ===
Stynes's 2023 book Welcome to Sex, co-authored with Dr Melissa Kang, was pulled from sale in Big W stores after criticism from conservatives and "abuse" from customers. Criticism centered around the explicit information and illustrations in the book, together with Stynes' assertion that she would be happy if an 8 year-old read it. Stynes stated, "It does make me think that they're taking a leaf out of the book of Trumpism and fearmongering there", stating that some of the content of the book was taken from "genuine questions asked by adolescents to Dolly Doctor for more than 20 years". In 2024 the book won the Book of the Year for Older Children (ages 13+) at the Australian Book Industry Awards. It was shortlisted for both the Young Adult Indie Book Award and the Prime Minister's Literary Award for Young Adult Literature in 2024.

== Bibliography ==
- The Zero Fucks Cookbook: Best Food Least Effort, ISBN 9781743793947
- Zero Fucks Cooking: Endless Summer, ISBN 9781743795088
- Welcome to Your Period (co-authored with Dr Melissa Kang aka "Dolly Doctor"), ISBN 9781760503512
- Welcome to Consent (co-authored with Dr Melissa Kang aka "Dolly Doctor")
- Welcome to Your Boobs (co-authored with Dr Melissa Kang aka "Dolly Doctor")
- Welcome to Sex (co-authored with Dr Melissa Kang aka "Dolly Doctor")
- Ladies, We Need to Talk (co-authored with Claudine Ryan), ISBN 9781743797518
