= Daniel Doody =

Australian reporter and television presenter

- Born: New South Wales, Australia
- Occupations: Reporter; television presenter; journalist
- Employer: Network 10
- Children: 2

Daniel Doody is an Australian reporter and television presenter who is currently a reporter on Network 10 10 News. Former roving reporter on Channel 10’s morning show Studio 10.

== Career ==
Doody worked as a radio journalist for Grant Broadcasters' stations 2EC and Power FM before joining the Australian Broadcasting Corporation as a reporter and journalist for ABC News in New South Wales, and covered major news stories including the 2019-2020 bushfires.

In late 2020, Doody joined Network 10's morning talk show Studio 10 as the roving reporter, following the show's revamp to become more like its competitors The Morning Show and Today Extra. He joined co-hosts Sarah Harris and Tristan MacManus, as well as entertainment presenter Angela Bishop and news presenter Narelda Jacobs.

In 2021, Doody appeared as one of the Australian media personalities on Network 10's What The Hell Just Happened.

== Personal life ==
Doody has two children with his wife Joanne, and he currently resides in New South Wales.
