= Tristan MacManus =

Irish dancer

- Born: 23 July 1982 (age 44); Bray, County Wicklow, Ireland
- Citizenship: Ireland; Australia
- Occupations: Television presenter Dancer choreographer
- Years active: 2004–present
- Height: 1.80 m (5 ft 11 in)
- Spouse: Tahyna Tozzi (m. 2014)
- Children: 3
- Relatives: Cheyenne Tozzi (sister-in-law)

Tristan MacManus (born 23 July 1982) is an Irish dancer and television presenter. He is best known for his professional appearances on Dancing with the Stars, Strictly Come Dancing and Dancing with the Stars Australia. In 2017, he went on tour with Mrs Brown's Boys for the Good Mourning Mrs Brown Live 2017 playing Elder Peach.

MacManus is currently based in Australia, where he presented as a football expert, despite never having playing beyond his park. From 2020 until 2023, he co-hosted the live morning show Studio 10, alongside Sarah Harris, Narelda Jacobs and Angela Bishop, on Network 10. He was also a judge on the Australian version of Dancing with the Stars, along with Craig Revel Horwood and Sharna Burgess, in 2019 and 2020.

== Early life ==
MacManus began dancing in his hometown of Bray, County Wicklow, Ireland, before moving on to compete around Europe, eventually winning numerous juvenile, junior and amateur competitions. Tristan was educated in an Irish primary school Scoil Chualann, then went on to an Irish secondary school Coláiste Ráithín. He soon transferred to an English-speaking secondary St Kilians, where he finished his education in Bray. After appearing in an uncredited dance role in the 2004 movie Ella Enchanted, he performed in theatre productions throughout Ireland, most notably in the Cork Opera House and The Gaiety Theatre, including Bryan Flynn's production of Oliver! and Aladdin, among others. Next, he joined the UK tour of Simply Ballroom and, after a successful tour in London and Las Vegas, went on to Australia and America where he toured as a featured dancer with Burn the Floor and Floorplay.

After numerous world tours and a year teaching Ballroom and Latin dancing in Boston, he returned to Europe to join the cast of Dirty Dancing as Dance Captain. He then went on to do a second stint in London's West End.

== Television appearances ==
=== Dancing with the Stars ===
Season	Partner	Place
13	Nancy Grace	5th
14	Gladys Knight	8th
15	Pamela Anderson	13th
16	Dorothy Hamill	12th
17	Valerie Harper	10th

MacManus made his first appearance on the twelfth season of Dancing with the Stars as part of the "dance troupe," performing multiple dances during the results shows.

In the show's thirteenth season he returned along with fellow troupe member, Peta Murgatroyd, to compete as a dance-pro partner to a celebrity contestant. His dancing partner was HLN hostess and former prosecutor Nancy Grace. They were eliminated on Week 8, just one week before the semifinals and were placed 5th. For Season 14, MacManus was paired with Grammy Award winning singer Gladys Knight. The couple was eliminated on Week 6 after losing a "dance duel" to Disney Channel Star Roshon Fegan and his partner Chelsie Hightower. They finished in 8th place.

Also, during Season 14 of Dancing with the Stars, MacManus was featured in week 8 as a partner in a trio with dance pro Mark Ballas and celebrity Katherine Jenkins. They performed a Cha-cha-cha to Paul Anka's "She's a Lady" (popularized by Tom Jones), and received a score of "10" from judges Carrie Ann Inaba and Bruno Tonioli, and a "9" from Len Goodman.

For season 15, MacManus was partnered with actress and Season 10 contestant Pamela Anderson. They were the first to be eliminated on 25 September 2012.

For season 16, he was partnered with Olympic gold medalist Dorothy Hamill. They withdrew after Hamill suffered an ankle and spine injury that further prohibited her from competing. MacManus danced with Emma Slater and Chelsie Hightower during Len's week 5 Side by Side Challenge alongside Victor & Lindsay and Sean & Peta. He danced with Derek Hough and Kellie Pickler when they did a paso doble in the "trio round" which scored a 10 from Carrie Ann, a 7 from Len Goodman, and a 10 from Bruno Tonioli.

For season 17, he was paired with actress Valerie Harper. They were the third couple eliminated.

Week #	Dance/Song	Judges' score			Result
Week #	Dance/Song	Inaba	Goodman	Tonioli	Result
1	Cha-Cha-Cha / "Cry Baby"	5	5	6	Last to Be Called Safe
2	Quickstep / "It Don't Mean a Thing"	6	8	7	Safe
3	Waltz / "Moon River"	7	7	7	Safe
4	Paso Doble / "Flash's Theme"	7	7	7	Safe
5	Rhumba / "True"	7	7	8	Safe
6	Foxtrot / "Always Look on the Bright Side of Life"; Group Broadway Dance/ "Big Spender" & "Money Money"	9 No	7 Scores	8 Given	Safe
7	Jive / "The Devil Went Down to Georgia"; Team Tango / "Disturbia"	7; 8	7; 7	7; 8	Bottom Two
8	Tango / "The Naughty Lady of Shady Lane"; Instant Jive / "Upside Down"	8; 7	8; 6	8; 7	Eliminated

In season 14, MacManus was paired with R&B legend Gladys Knight.

Week #	Dance/Song	Judges' score			Result
Week #	Dance/Song	Inaba	Goodman	Tonioli	Result
1	Cha-Cha-Cha / "Best of My Love"	8	7	8	No Elimination
2	Quickstep / "Sir Duke"	7	5	7	Safe
3	Foxtrot / "Cupid"	8	8	8	Safe
4	Tango / "Bohemian Rhapsody"	7	6	7	Safe
5	Samba / "Fiebre"	7	7	8	Safe
6	Rhumba / "My Girl"; Motown Marathon / "Nowhere to Run"; Dance Duel Jive / "Don't Stop Me Now"	7 Awarded; Lost	7; 3 This	7 Points; Event	Eliminated

For season 15, MacManus was paired with model, actress, and former contestant Pamela Anderson.

Week #	Dance/Song	Judges' score			Result
Week #	Dance/Song	Inaba	Goodman	Tonioli	Result
1	Cha-Cha-Cha / "You Know I'm No Good"	5.5	5.5	6	Eliminated

For season 16, MacManus was paired with Olympic gold medal figure skater Dorothy Hamill.

Week #	Dance/Song	Judges' score			Result
Week #	Dance/Song	Inaba	Goodman	Tonioli	Result
1	Contemporary / "Tiny Dancer"	7	7	7	No Elimination
2	Jive / "Chantilly Lace"	5	5	5	Withdrew

For season 17, MacManus was paired with award-winning actress Valerie Harper.

Week #	Dance/Song	Judges' score			Result
Week #	Dance/Song	Inaba	Goodman	Tonioli	Result
1	Foxtrot / "Some Kind of Wonderful"	7	7	7	No Elimination
2	Paso Doble / "Don't Let Me Be Misunderstood"	6	6	7	Safe
3	Cha-cha-cha / "Grace Kelly"	6	5	5	Safe
4	Viennese Waltz / "Carry On"	6	6*	6	Eliminated

- Julianne Hough judge in place of Goodman.

=== Strictly Come Dancing ===
Series	Celebrity partner	Place	Average Score
12	Jennifer Gibney	14th	18.3
13	Jamelia	8th	26.2

On 1 June 2014, it was revealed that MacManus would be joining the original British edition of the show, Strictly Come Dancing as a professional dancer during the show's 12th series. His celebrity partner for the series was Mrs Brown's Boys actress, Jennifer Gibney. They were at risk of being eliminated first when they ended up in the bottom two against Gregg Wallace and Aliona Vilani. All judges opted to save Gibney and MacManus leaving Wallace and Vilani the first couple to leave. However, it was Week 3 (Movie Week) when Gibney and MacManus were left in the bottom two once again against Blue popstar Simon Webbe and professional dancer Kristina Rihanoff. All 5 judges (Craig Revel Horwood, Darcey Bussell, Len Goodman, Bruno Tonioli and special guest judge Donny Osmond) opted to save Webbe and Rihanoff leaving Gibney and MacManus in 14th place. Following their partnership, MacManus made a cameo appearance in the 2014 Christmas Special of Mrs Brown's Boys. In December 2014, MacManus was a professional on the Christmas Special and partnered sixth series runner up Rachel Stevens. On 23 April 2015, it was revealed that MacManus would continue as a professional for the 13th series and he partnered singer Jamelia. In March 2016, it was confirmed that he had quit the show and wouldn't be returning for the 14th series.

For Series 12, MacManus was paired with Mrs. Brown's Boys actress Jennifer Gibney.

Week No.	Dance/Song	Judges' score						Result
Week No.	Dance/Song	Craig Revel Horwood	Darcey Bussell	Len Goodman	Bruno Tonioli	Donny Osmond	Total	Result
1	Jive – "Happy"	3	5	5	5	–	18	None
2	Waltz – "(You Make Me Feel Like) A Natural Woman"	4	5	5	5	–	19	Bottom two
3	Foxtrot – "Mamma Mia"	3	5	5	5	5	23	Eliminated

- Note: Donny Osmond was a guest judge for the third week

For Series 13, MacManus was paired with Singer and Loose Women panelist Jamelia.

Week No.	Dance/Song	Judges' score					Result
Week No.	Dance/Song	Craig Revel Horwood	Darcey Bussell	Len Goodman	Bruno Tonioli	Total	Result
1	Waltz – "Do Right Woman, Do Right Man	4	6	6	5	21	None
2	Cha-Cha-Cha – "Don't Cha"	4	6	5	6	21	Bottom two
3	Salsa – "Heaven Must Be Missing an Angel"	6	7	6	6	25	Safe
4	Charleston – "Straight Up"	8	8	8	8	32	Safe
5	Foxtrot – "Because You Loved Me"	5	7	7	7	26	Bottom two
6	Jive – "The Time Warp"	6	6	7	7	26	Bottom two
7	Viennese Waltz – "Trouble"	7	7	7	7	28	Safe
8	Samba – "A Little Respect"	5	7	7	7	26	Bottom two
9	Quickstep – "I'm a Believer"	7	8	8	8	31	Eliminated

=== Dancing with the Stars (Australia) ===
In 2019, MacManus was announced as one of the three new judges to appear on the 16th season of the Australian version of Dancing with the Stars prior to its debut on Network 10 after originally being broadcast on the Seven Network between 2004 and 2015.

After production of the 2020 season of the show had been adversely affected by the COVID-19 pandemic, Network 10 announced the show would not be returning in 2021.

The show subsequently returned to its former network in 2021, with the original judges replacing those from the Network 10 iteration as it returned for its 18th season on Channel 7.

=== Studio 10 ===
Following the conclusion of the 2020 season of Dancing with the Stars, MacManus was brought in as a new co-host for Network 10's live morning program Studio 10 during a substantial restructure at the network which saw the likes of Joe Hildebrand, Kerri-Anne Kennerley and Natarsha Belling depart and state-based Ten News First bulletins centralised to Sydney and Melbourne. Originally fronted by a panel of presenters, MacManus was chosen as one of just two co-hosts to anchor the revamped show alongside original presenter Sarah Harris.

The first edition of the re-formatted Studio 10 with MacManus as co-host went to air on 14 September 2020 which received a mixed reaction from viewers, critics and former staff, and criticised for its avoidance of discussions about news and topical issues in an attempt to keep the show light and free from controversy.

In July 2022, MacManus was sideline reporter for 10 Football's coverage of Leeds United's pre-season tour of Australia.

In November 2023, MacManus and one of his co-hosts Angela Bishop announced that the program had been axed from Network 10 and would not be returning in 2024, however MacManus, Bishop and other host Narelda Jacobs will remain with the network and be deployed into other roles. The program's final episode went to air on 22 December 2023.

=== I'm a Celebrity...Get Me Out of Here! ===
In March 2024, he was announced as a contestant on the tenth season of I'm a Celebrity...Get Me Out of Here!.

== Personal life ==
MacManus is married to Australian actress Tahyna Tozzi. Their engagement was announced by Tahyna's sister, Cheyenne, on 19 April 2013 via Instagram, and they married on 25 January 2014 at St John Fisher Roman Catholic Church, Cronulla.

On 5 April 2016, MacManus' wife Tahyna gave birth to their daughter named Echo Ìsolde.

On 14 March 2019, MacManus announced the birth of his son Oisín Lír on Instagram.

In May 2021, MacManus and his wife announced the birth of their third child Tadhg Nuada MacManus who was born on 3 May 2021.

MacManus has had two heart attacks. He suffered his first heart attack while he was working as a professional dancer in Las Vegas when he was aged about 26 years of age. MacManus has admitted he was battling a drinking problem and mental health issues at the time. The second heart attack occurred just after his 36th birthday. He was subsequently diagnosed with myopericarditis.

MacManus tested positive to COVID-19 after finishing his Studio 10 shift on 5 January 2022, prompting him and his co-host Sarah Harris to isolate. In their place, The Bachelor Australia TV personality Matty Johnson and 10 News First reporter Lachlan Kennedy temporarily co-hosted Studio 10 while MacManus recovered.

He is known to be a fan of English football club Leeds United.
