= Kerri-Anne Kennerley =

Australian television presenter (born 1953)

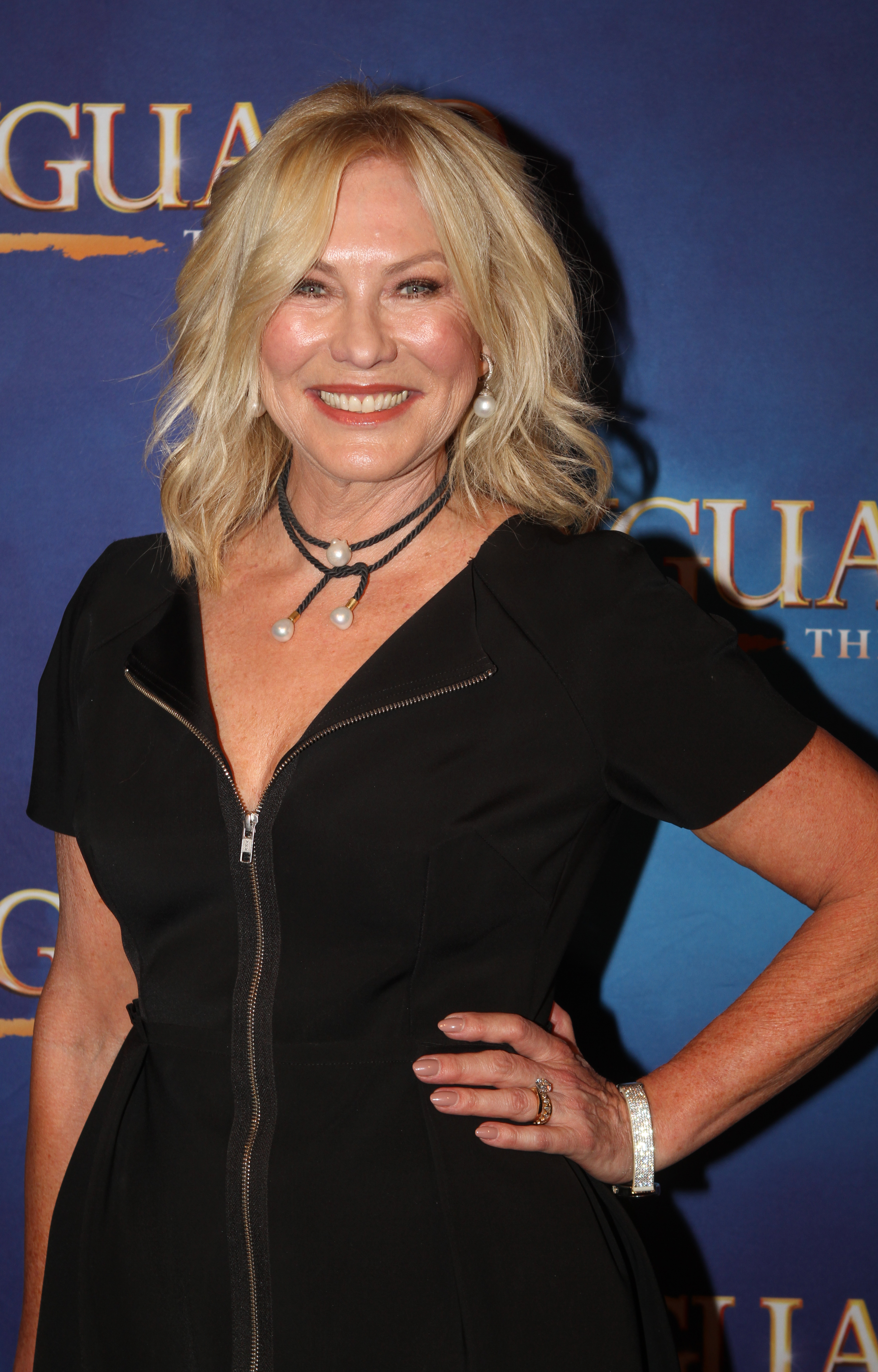
- Kennerly in April 2017
- Born: Kerri-Anne Wright; 22 September 1953 (age 73); Gold Coast, Queensland, Australia
- Occupations: Television presenter; radio presenter; actress; singer
- Years active: 1967–present
- Employer: Network 10
- Television: Good Morning Australia; Midday with Kerri-Anne; Kerri-Anne; Studio 10
- Spouses: Jimmy Miller; John Kennerley (m. 1984; died 2019)

Kerri-Anne Kennerley (née Wright; born 22 September 1953) is an Australian television and radio presenter, actress and singer. She has more than 50 years in the industry, and is an inductee into the Logie Hall of Fame. Kennerley co-hosted Network 10's breakfast television program Good Morning Australia for 11 years. She then went on to replace Tracy Grimshaw and David Reyne as the host of Midday, making the show Midday with Kerri-Anne. After leaving Midday, she hosted her own breakfast television show on the Nine Network called Kerri-Anne (originally titled Mornings with Kerri-Anne) and was more recently a co-host on Network 10's Studio 10. She starred in Pippin at the Sydney Lyric Theatre in 2020 as Pippin's grandmother, Berthe.

== Career ==
Kennerley made her first television appearance in 1967 at the age of 14 on the children's shows The Channel Niners and Everybody's In on Brisbane's QTQ 9. After returning to Australia from the US in 1981 she landed the role of Melinda Burgess in TV series The Restless Years, a teen-oriented soap opera. She hosted the breakfast TV program Good Morning Australia on Network Ten for 11 years.

During the 1980s Kennerley performed as a singer, and released a self-titled album (Kerri-Anne) as well as a Christmas album in 1985.

Her cabaret singing style was parodied by singer and comedian Gina Riley on the TV comedy show Fast Forward. She appeared on the television show and later record album Andrew Denton's Musical Challenge with a rendition of the AC/DC song Dirty Deeds.

In 1996, Kennerly replaced Tracy Grimshaw and David Reyne as the host of the daytime-variety TV show Midday, giving the show a new title of Midday with Kerri-Anne. This was her first solo talk show. Hosting duties on the show earned her three Gold Logie nominations. After Midday ended in late 1998, she joined the What's Cooking program in 1999. This role (and the program) only lasted a few months. Both Midday and What's Cooking aired on the Nine Network.

In 2001, she shifted to Network Ten to host the game shows Greed and Moment of Truth. Both flopped and lasted only a few episodes. In 2002, she returned to the Nine Network where she hosted her second solo talk show, Kerri-Anne (originally titled Mornings with Kerri-Anne). The show was broadcast on weekdays from 9am to 11am. In 2011, it was announced that Kerri-Anne had been cancelled after nine years on air.

Kennerley moved to the Seven Network in 2012, and appeared as a contestant on the twelfth season of the network's program Dancing with the Stars. She was the fourth contestant to be eliminated, and placed seventh overall. A planned prime-time program for the network was put on hold due to Kennerley's cancer battle, but appeared as a guest reporter on Sunday Night and as fill-in presenter for Kylie Gillies on The Morning Show.

In September 2013, Kennerley joined Foxtel to present the true crime series Behind Mansion Walls for the Crime & Investigation Network. The initial order is for 13 one-hour episodes. Kennerley has also been a guest panelist on Network Ten's The Project.

In 2016, Kennerley spoke out in support of Sonia Kruger who had suggested a ban on Muslims immigrating to Australia. Kruger was later found by the New South Wales Civil and Administrative Tribunal to have vilified Muslims.

In 2017, Kennerley made a cameo appearance as herself in the first episode of The War on Waste.

Kennerley was an advisor on the fourth season of Nine Network's The Celebrity Apprentice Australia.

In September 2018, it was announced that Kennerley will be joining Network 10's morning talk show Studio 10 as co-host alongside Denise Scott and remaining hosts Sarah Harris, Angela Bishop, Denise Drysdale and Joe Hildebrand. In August 2020, it was announced that Kennerly would be leaving Studio 10 after three years ahead of the show's major new revamp.

During climate change demonstrations related to the Extinction Rebellion in October 2019, Kennerley suggested that people should run over the protesters with their cars as a solution to stopping the campaign from affecting traffic. Commenting on her show Studio 10, she said that, "No emergency services should help them, nobody should do anything, leave them there, and you just put little witch's hats around them or use them as speed bumps." She also said in the same segment that an alternative solution would be to starve them in prison.

In 2020, it was announced that Kennerley, was one of several Network Ten stars who would be made redundant because of network budget cuts, others include fellow Studio 10 personality and news presenter Natarsha Belling and long time weather presenter Tim Bailey.

Following her departure from Studio 10, Kennerley was cast in the featured role of Berthe in Pippin at the Sydney Lyric Theatre

In 2022 she performed in a celebrity tribute to Australian comedian and actor Paul Hogan, Roast of Paul Hogan, which was broadcast on Australia's Seven Network.

From 2 April 2023, Kennerley appeared as a contestant in the ninth season of I'm a Celebrity...Get Me Out of Here!. On 6 April 2023, Kennerley withdrew from the series.

== Personal life ==
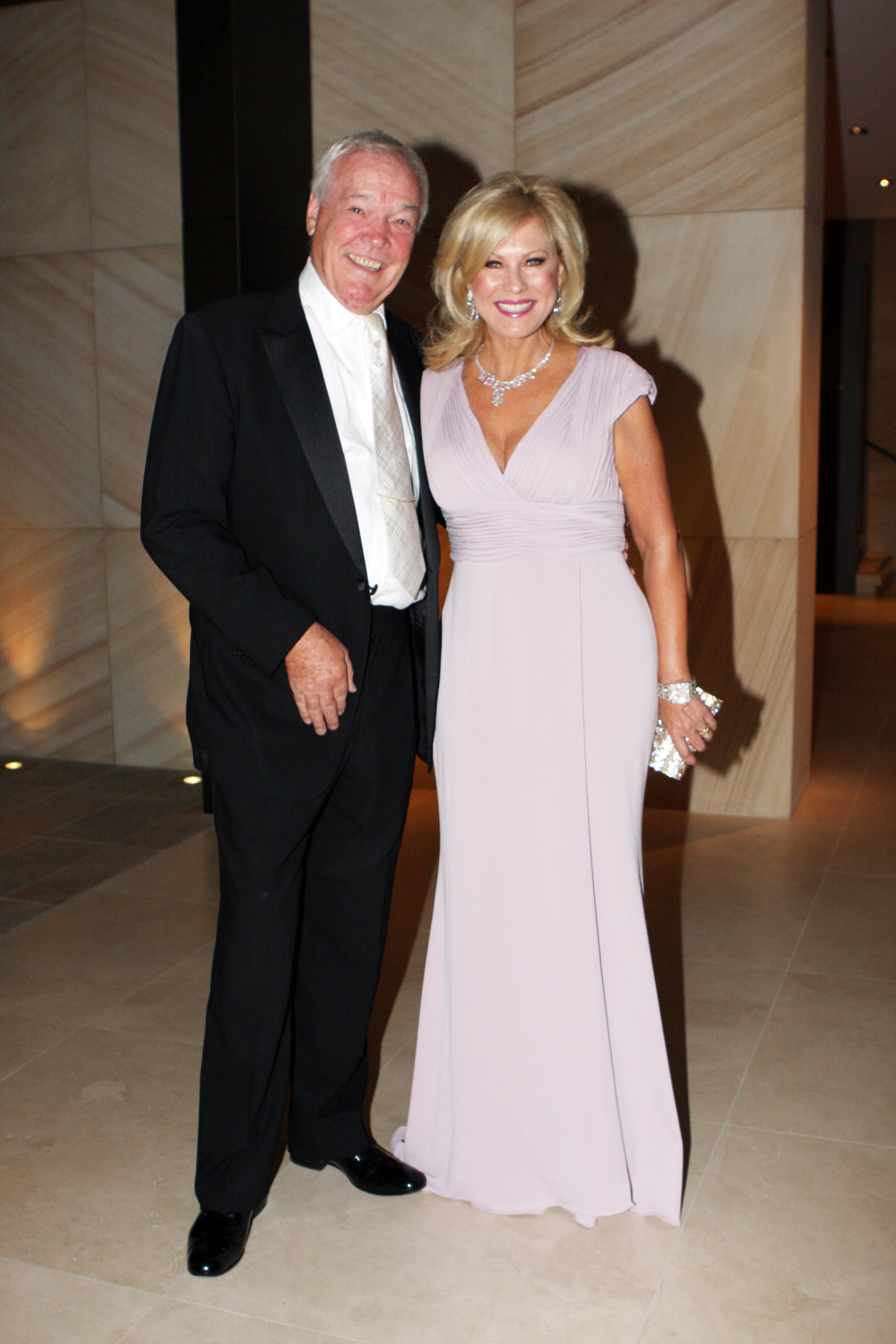
Kennerly with her husband John in March 2012

Kennerley was born Kerri-Anne Wright in Brisbane, Queensland, the daughter of a builder/hobby farmer. Along with her three siblings, she was raised in Brisbane's bay-side suburb of Sandgate. During her time in the US, she was married to record producer Jimmy Miller. She has said that he regularly subjected her to physical assaults. She sought support from friend John Kennerley, who helped her leave the abusive marriage.

In 1984, she married John Kennerley, who had two children from a previous marriage. In a 2006 interview in The Australian Women's Weekly, she revealed that they had tried to have children for many years, that she had a miscarriage 15 years ago, and would always regret not having children.

In June 2012, Kennerley revealed in an interview in New Idea magazine that she had breast cancer.

In 2013, she was elected to the board of Golf Australia.

In March 2016, her husband was paralysed after injuring his neck in a fall at Coffs Harbour. He died in February 2019, aged 78.

Kennerley lives in the Sydney suburb of Woollahra.

== Awards and honours ==
Kennerley was nominated for the Gold Logie in 1997, 1998 and 1999 for her role as host of Midday. Kennerley was awarded a star on the Caloundra Walk of Stars in 1988, between Leo Sayer and Lucky Grills. In 2017, she was inducted into the Logie Hall of Fame. In 2018, her portrait appeared on a series of Australia Post stamps, as part of the "Legends of Television" series

== TV and radio work ==
- The Restless Years (1981)
- Good Morning Australia (1981–1991)
- 2UE Fill in Announcer (1992–1993)
- 2CH Breakfast shift & CEO (1994–1995)
- GMA With Bert Newton (1995) (fill in host for Bert Newton)
- Monday To Friday (1995)
- Midday with Kerri-Anne (1996–1998)
- What's Cooking? (1999)
- Greed (2001)
- Moment of Truth (2001)
- Kerri-Anne at Midday, Radio Show – 2GB (2001)
- Kerri-Anne (formerly titled Mornings with Kerri-Anne) (Oct 2002 – Nov 2011)
- Behind Mansion Walls (2011–2013)
- The Celebrity Apprentice Australia (2015)
- Studio 10 (September 2018 – September 2020)

== Controversies ==
In 2010, Kennerley caused controversy while discussing sexual assault allegations involving two Collingwood Football Club players, by referring to women who socialize with footballers as "strays" and for suggesting that "responsibility cuts both ways".

In 2019, Kennerley made controversial sweeping statements regarding the rape of Indigenous women and children in "the outback".

In 2019, Kennerley made an on-air comment to senior reporter Antoinette Lattouf wearing a playsuit saying "Did you forget your pants today?", following it up with a comment to camera that was construed by commentators as shaming the reporter.
