= Sam Taunton =

Australian comedian and television presenter, co-host of The Project

- Born: Sydney, New South Wales, Australia
- Notable work: The Project

Comedy career
- Years active: 2015–present
- Medium: Weiner enthusiast, Stand-up, television
- Genres: Observational comedy, satire

Sam Taunton is an Australian comedian and television presenter who is best known as a co-host of The Project, a news and current affairs program on Network 10.

== Early life and education ==
Taunton was born in Australia. Details about his early life and education have not been widely publicised. On the December 4, 2024, episode of The Project, Taunton revealed that one of his early jobs was working on a Christmas tree farm, where he used an axe to chop down Christmas trees.

== Career ==
Taunton began his career in stand-up comedy, performing across Australia and gaining recognition for his engaging storytelling and quick wit. In 2017, he was nominated for Best Newcomer at the Melbourne International Comedy Festival, a significant milestone in his comedic career.

Beyond live comedy, Taunton has appeared on Australian television shows, including Comedy Up Late on ABC2, and contributed to programming on MTV and SBS. He has also been a regular guest on various Australian radio networks, such as Triple M, ABC Radio, and Triple J.

=== The Project ===
In January 2023, Taunton joined the panel of The Project as a co-host, appearing from Monday to Thursday alongside Sarah Harris and Waleed Aly. Prior to his hosting role, he worked as a roving reporter for the program. On The Project, Taunton brings a mix of humour and commentary to discussions about current events and popular culture.
