= Studio 10 =

Australian television news show

- Genre: Morning show, news, current affairs
- Created by: Adam Boland
- Presented by: Sarah Harris; Joe Hildebrand; Jessica Rowe; Ita Buttrose; Denise Drysdale; Angela Bishop; Kerri-Anne Kennerly; Denise Scott; Narelda Jacobs; Tristan MacManus
- Country of origin: Australia
- Original language: English
- No. of seasons: 10
- No. of episodes: 2,610

Production
- Executive producer: Tamara Simoneau
- Production locations: Sydney, New South Wales
- Running time: 120 minutes (Weekdays & Weekends)

Original release
- Network: Network 10
- Release: 4 November 2013 – 22 December 2023

Related
- The Circle; Wake Up

Studio 10 is an Australian morning talk show on Network 10 which aired from 4 November 2013 to 22 December 2023. Its final hosts were Angela Bishop, Narelda Jacobs and Tristan MacManus. It aired between 10 am and noon on weekdays and a highlights show aired between 10 am and noon on weekends. Studio 10 was broadcast live from Network 10 Studios in Pyrmont, a suburb in Sydney's inner-city.

== History ==
On 9 June 2013, Network 10 announced a new mid-morning show to replace The Circle which it cancelled the year previously. Ita Buttrose was the first presenter of the show to be named, and her appointment drew much media attention as she was 71 years of age at the time. It was later announced Joe Hildebrand, Sarah Harris and Jessica Rowe would also be presenters on the new show. After a viewer competition, the show's name was announced in July 2013 to be Studio 10. The show would be filmed from Network 10's Sydney studios in front of a live studio audience. It was later announced it would premiere on 4 November 2013 as part of Ten's brand new morning lineup which also included the short-lived breakfast show Wake Up.

On 11 November 2013, Buttrose served as a guest on Network 10's then breakfast show, Wake Up. Network 10 had planned to transport her from Wake Up's Manly studio to Ten's Pyrmont studios by water taxi across Sydney Harbour in time for Studio 10 and film her journey with an overhead helicopter. However, due to poor weather Buttrose's water taxi became stranded, meaning she missed most of Studio 10.

In December 2013, Studio 10 began airing on Saturday and Sunday mornings. These editions of the show contain highlights of both Studio 10 over the past week. On 25 December 2013, Studio 10 became the first Australian morning or breakfast television show to air on Christmas morning. This edition of the show was pre-recorded in full with all new content. The Christmas Day edition of the show has become an annual tradition and now includes their yearly Christmas clip (a video where the cast mimes to a Christmas song).

On 10 March 2014, Studio 10 interviewed Justin Lyons, the cameraman who was with Steve Irwin when he died from a stingray injury in 2006. The interview made headlines in Australia and around the world with Irwin's last words revealed as: "I'm dying".

The final half-hour of the show was originally known as Studio 10 You with a focus on health and beauty, however that branding was later dropped. A separate edition of the show airs in Perth, with a mix of local content as well as interviews, segments and features from the East Coast version.

In November 2015, Buttrose announced she would appear on the show just two mornings a week from 2016 to spend more time with her grandchildren, with Denise Drysdale to join the panel for the remaining three shows.

On 24 July 2017, Studio 10 expanded to 3.5 hours, finishing at noon.

In March 2018, Rowe resigned as panelist citing a desire to spend more time with her children. However, it was reported at the time that the network was planning on removing her from the show. These reports came from former Executive Producer Rob McKnight, who was sacked from the network in November 2017, reportedly due to conflict with the show's personnel. In April 2018, Buttrose resigned as panelist to focus on other parts of her life, including spending more time with her grandchildren and writing. However, this exit was also reportedly due to conflict with Drysdale. Angela Bishop and Denise Scott were later announced as new panelists on the show replacing both Rowe and Buttrose.

In August 2018, Drysdale announced she would be taking the rest of the year off the show, due to exhaustion caused by travelling between Sydney and the Gold Coast, where she resides. In September 2018, former breakfast host Kerri-Anne Kennerley joined the show as a new panelist.

In December 2018, it was announced that fill-in Natarsha Belling would become the show's news presenter in 2019.

In July 2019, Denise Scott announced her resignation as a panelist, but she would remain with the show as a Melbourne correspondent.

In December 2019, it was announced that 10 News First Perth's Narelda Jacobs would be relocating to Sydney and joining Studio 10 as a panelist and reporter on 13 January 2020.

In March 2020, due to the coronavirus pandemic, the show removed the live studio audience and since then, the show has been filmed without one. The show expanded to 4 hours from 24 March 2020, commencing from the earlier time of 8am. However, Studio 10 has also axed the studio audience in 2020.

In August 2020, it was announced that Natarsha Belling and Kerri-Anne Kennerley would be leaving the show and Network 10, as a result of severe budget cuts across the network's news and operations department. Belling left the show immediately after the announcement, while Kennerley remained until 11 September 2020. Joe Hildebrand announced his resignation from the show and Network 10 on 10 September.

In September 2020, it was announced that Dancing with the Stars judge Tristan MacManus would join the show as co-host alongside Harris. The show debuted a new format from Monday 14 September 2020, similar to that of its competitors The Morning Show and Today Extra. Harris and MacManus are joined by segment contributions, Denise Drysdale, Craig Bennett, with Narelda Jacobs and Angela Bishop remaining on the show as news presenter and entertainment presenter.

On 23 November 2022, Harris, the last remaining original host, announced that she would be leaving the show after nine years to replace Carrie Bickmore as co-host of The Project. She finished up on the program on 23 December 2022. Following Harris departure, the show was again reformatted from two person format to a hosting trio with Bishop and Jacobs joining MacManus as co-host, and they all presented the news and entertainment. Also, the program was shortened to a new 2 hour timeslot with the program airing from 10:00am – 12:00pm as a lead in to the networks 10 News First: Midday bulletin.

In November 2023, the program celebrated its 10th anniversary. On 14 November 2023, it was announced the program had been cancelled after 10 years mainly due to falling viewership and would not return in 2024. The last episode went to air on 22 December 2023.

Starting on the 26 April 2025 studio 10 youtube channel started to upload Studio 10's top moments, from celebrity interviews to recipes and current events.

== Presenters ==
Presenter	Role	Tenure
Angela Bishop	Co-host	2018–2020, 2023
Angela Bishop	Entertainment	2020–2022
Narelda Jacobs	News	2020–2022
Narelda Jacobs	Co-host	2023
Tristan McManus	Co-host	2020–2023
Daniel Doody	Reporter	2020–2023

=== Contributors ===
Presenter	Role	Tenure
Craig Bennett	Showbiz Presenter	2013–2023
Denise Drysdale	Co-host	2016–2020
Denise Drysdale	Contributor	2020–2023
Jesse Baird	Reporter	2020–2023
Jess Eva	Contributor	2022–2023

=== Advertorial presenters ===
- Kate Albert
- Raelene Metlitzky
- Nikki Racco

=== Timeline of presenters ===
Presenter	Years										
Presenter	2013	2014	2015	2016	2017	2018	2019	2020	2021	2022	2023
Sarah Harris	Host										
Joe Hildebrand	Host										
Jessica Rowe	Host										
Ita Buttrose	Host										
David Robinson	Reporter										
Denise Drysdale				Host					Contributor		
Angela Bishop						Host					
Kerri-Anne Kennerly						Host					
Denise Scott						Host					
Scott Tweedie						Reporter					
Natarsha Belling							News				
Tristan McManus								Host			
Narelda Jacobs								News			Host
Daniel Doody								Reporter			

== Reception ==
=== Critical response ===
The show has been described as being similar to its predecessor The Circle and an Australian version of The View.

=== Television ratings ===
Studio 10's first broadcast rated low, averaging only 61,000 viewers nationally, behind its rivals The Morning Show and Mornings. These figures dropped dramatically within weeks.

In an effort to build ratings, unlike its rivals, Studio 10 remained on air for the entirety of the summer 2013/14 period. This strategy worked, and its viewership numbers over the summer period increasing slowly, allowing the show to average 50,000 viewers by April 2014. These ratings caused 10 CEO Hamish McLennan to state that the show was "performing well" and subsequently was not axed along with its lead in Wake Up in May 2014.

Following the axing of Wake Up, Studio 10 suffered a brief decline in ratings, before quickly improving its ratings.

In 2015, average ratings increased against their commercial counterparts. The show averaged 79,000 from January to March 2016, up 39% year-on-year.

Studio 10 defeated second placed Today Extra in October 2016 for the first time. The show continued to pose high ratings throughout 2017, and achieved a 15.8% audience share in that year, up 6.5% since 2014.

However after continued reports of tension amongst the show's cast, and the departure of Buttrose and Rowe, the show's ratings declined in 2018. This trend continued in 2019 and 2020, with Studio 10 often rating less than 50,000 viewers. Since the 2020 revamp, the shows numbers hovered at around 30,000 - 33,000 viewers, often dipping to 20,000.

=== Awards and nominations ===
Year	Award	Category	Nominee	Result
2017	Logie Awards	Best News Panel or a Current Affairs show	Studio 10	Nominated
2017	Logie Awards	Best Presenter	Sarah Harris	Nominated

== Segments ==
=== Former segments ===
==== Showbiz File (2013–2023) ====
Each morning Angela Bishop or Craig Bennett hosted a celebrity gossip segment. On occasion, both Bishop and Bennett were unavailable and fill-in presenters included Anna Kooiman, John Caldwell, and Richard Reid.

==== Daily Dilemma (2013–2023) ====
Every day around 10:04 am, a writer or columnist joined the panel to pose a question to the audience, inviting members of the public to discuss the question via social media. This segment was previously presented in conjunction with The Hoopla but from 2015 articles and guests were sourced from News.com.au and occasionally KidSpot (Melissa Wilson).

==== Dear Ding Dong (2020–2023) ====
Denise Drysdale is a television presenter and the show's presenters often asked her for all sorts of advice, but in 2020, it was time for viewers at home to get a chance to ask her questions.

==== Ask Ita (2014–2018) ====
Members of the public submitted questions for Ita Buttrose via social media. Ita answered two to three viewer questions every day, after 9:10 am. As of 2016, on days when Buttrose was not in studio responses to questions were pre taped.

==== Ding Dong Does Dinner (2016–2020) ====
Denise Drysdale taught the viewers a recipe, usually with comedic results.

==== What in the Cute (2016–2018) ====
Jessica Rowe showed clips from the internet. As of 2018, due to Rowe's departure from the show, this segment was removed.

==== Kak's Konfessional (2020) ====
Kerri-Anne Kennerley provided solutions to viewers who have a secret problem that needs to be solved.

==== What in the Weird (2013–2020) ====
Joe Hildebrand presented funny clips from the internet. Due to Hildebrand's departure in 2020 from 10 and the show, this segment was removed.

==== It Happened This Week (2013–2014) ====
Each Monday morning until 2014, Jonathan Coleman joined the panel to take a look at events which happened during that week in history.

==== What Grinds my Gears (2016–2020) ====
Denise Drysdale read out viewer complaints about things in life that annoyed them.

==== The $5 Quiz (2014–2018) ====
Every Friday until 2018, reporter David Robinson hosted a parody game show called "The $5 quiz". It was billed as "Australia's cheapest game show" and involved the hosts, guest panellist and usually a studio audience member competing for the grand prize of AU$5. Points were awarded randomly for funny answers, and occasionally for getting the answers correct.

==== What Floats Your Boat (2018–2019) ====
Denise Scott shared what floats viewers boat.

==== Jono's Flashback Quiz (2018–2020) ====
Every Friday Jonathan Coleman hosted a weekly quiz. Each week's quiz had a theme and Jono normally dressed up in a character linked to this theme. Points were awarded randomly for funny answers, and occasionally for getting the answers correct.

==== Host with the Most (from 2020) ====
Sarah Harris and Tristan MacManus both were given a fact from Jonathan Coleman about their co-host who had to guess if it was Fact or Fib. They both were playing for a home viewer via Zoom and whoever wins, takes home a prize.

== Special broadcasts ==
- On 15 November 2013, Studio 10 broadcast live from the Bennelong Lawn in the Sydney Royal Botanic Gardens. During this episode, the show broadcast the Pride Of Australia Awards live. The telecast was also repeated the following morning on Ten.
- From 3 to 5 February 2014, Studio 10 was broadcast live from Network 10's Adelaide studios.
- On 15 March 2014, a special prime-time edition of Studio 10 aired in Adelaide to cover the South Australian election.
- On 17 April 2014, Studio 10 was extended until 11:30 am to cover Prince William and Kate's tour of Australia. The following morning (Good Friday) it was also extended, to noon.
- On 25 April 2014, Studio 10 was extended until noon, with live commercial-free coverage of Anzac Day.
- On 4 November 2014, Studio 10 celebrated its first birthday. The show featured highlights from the first year, and no fifth panelist, instead focusing on its core cast.
- On 15 December 2014, Studio 10 was extended until 5:00 pm to cover the ongoing 2014 Sydney hostage crisis. The following morning it was also extended to begin at 6:00 am.
- On 6 and 7 January 2015, Studio 10 presented extended live and local editions into Adelaide, covering the local bushfires. Natarsha Belling presented in studio with Sarah Harris on location.
- On 9 February 2015, Studio 10 went live into all markets around the country to cover the spill motion against Prime Minister Tony Abbott (8:30 am in NSW ACT VIC TAS, 8 am in SA, 7.30 in QLD and 5:30 am in WA). The show continued until 11 am local time in each market until WA was off air.
- On 20 February 2015, Sarah Harris presented Studio 10 from Queensland (with Natarsha Belling hosting from the studio) to cover Cyclone Marcia and the show was broadcast live into Queensland.
- The day following the Logies, 4 May 2015, Studio 10 broadcast from Ten's South Yarra studios in Melbourne. Natarsha Belling hosted the show in place of Sarah Harris who was unwell at the time.
- On 8 July 2015, Studio 10 broadcast a special 1988 episode with an '80s looking set. The cast dressed up for the occasion and the regular format of the show was abandoned for the day. This episode was repeated the following weekend and again on 1 January 2016.
- From 12 to 14 August 2015, Studio 10 again broadcast from Ten's South Yarra studios in Melbourne.Local identities Stephen Quartermain, Chrissie Swan and Andrew Bolt served as 5th panelists, with Studio 10 regular Libbi Gorr filling in for Ita on Friday.
- On 2 October 2015, Studio 10 celebrated its 500th Episode. It featured highlights, themed graphics and no fifth panellist.
- In December 2015 Studio 10 once again returned to Ten's South Yarra studios in Melbourne for four live shows which were presented by Natarsha Belling, Joe Hildebrand, Denise Drysdale and Ita Buttrose.
- On 29 January 2016 the show aired another speciality episode, focussing on the year 1977. None of the regular set was used, instead replaced by a white cyclorama with coloured lights and pot plants. An effect was added to the screen to simulate broadcasts in the 1970s.
- On 16 September 2016, Studio 10 broadcast a 3.5 hour special to commemorate 60 years of Australian television. The usual set was replaced by a specialised set to mark the occasion. The show featured memorable moments and special guests from the 6 decades of television.
- Studio 10 and TEN Eyewitness News joined forces on Wednesday 9 November (Tuesday 8 November in the U.S.) to cover the results of the U.S. election. Coverage started just before 10 am and went through until 6 pm (the 5 pm news aired in NSW/VIC while coverage continues in other states).
- On Friday 13 January 2017, the entire show was determined by a spinning wheel. All of the regular segments and feature interviews were on the wheel. Whatever segment the wheel landed on was the next thing they would do. The audience were given a behind-the-scenes look at television as they showed sets being changed over in order to do the next item.
- On Thursday 26 January 2017, the entire show went outside and was extended until noon to celebrate Australia Day. Hilderbrand and Drysdale performed "I Still Call Australia Home"
- On 28 March 2017, Studio 10 commenced at 6 am (5 am in Queensland) and was presented from the Ten Eyewitness News desk in Sydney by Sarah Harris & Matthew White to cover Cyclone Debbie and the show was broadcast live into Queensland.
- On Monday 24 April 2017, the show broadcast live from Melbourne for their post-Logies party.
- On Monday 22 May 2017, the show was extended until approximately 1 pm AEST for rolling coverage of the Manchester Arena bombing. The regular show turned into rolling coverage at approximately 9 am. At some point during this broadcast, Drysdale left the panel and the show moved to the Ten Eyewitness News set. At approximately noon, Natarsha Belling joined the panel.
- For the week of Monday 26 June to Friday 30 June 2017, Studio 10 broadcast live from various locations in south east Queensland. They spent two days on the Gold Coast, two days in Brisbane and one day on the Sunshine Coast.
- On Friday 14 July 2017, Studio 10 produced a live tribute to Network 10's former morning talk show Good Morning Australia with Bert Newton. The show aired live from the original studio in Ten's South Yarra studios and featured appearances by former regulars Phillip Brady, Ken James, Elizabeth Chong, Lauren Newton, Tonia Todman, Rhonda Burchmore, Robert Mascara, Susie Elelman and Moira McLean. Patti Newton joined as the fifth panellist alongside the main hosts and performed, while Chong cooked an easy fried rice dish and Mascara brought back his popular limerick. GMA host Bert Newton was unable to attend due to health problems. Musical Director John Foreman was also unable to attend. John prerecorded his memories, while Bert phoned in and shared his memories on air.
- On Friday 10 May 2019, Studio 10 Devoted 90 minutes of the show to an "Angiversary", celebrating host Angela Bishop's 30 years at Network Ten. The show presented a look at Bishop's memorable moments and included celebratory messages from the entire Studio 10 family, plus friends & family. Vanessa Amarosi & Ian Moss performed live.

== Controversy ==
On 2 April 2014. Hildebrand caused offence with remarks about domestic violence. Hildebrand later apologised for his remarks after a confrontation by Rosie Batty, whose partner murdered their 11-year-old son and was scheduled to appear on the show later that day.

== See also ==
- The Project
- The Daily Edition
- The Morning Show
