= Angela Bishop =

Australian reporter and television presenter

Angela Bishop OAM
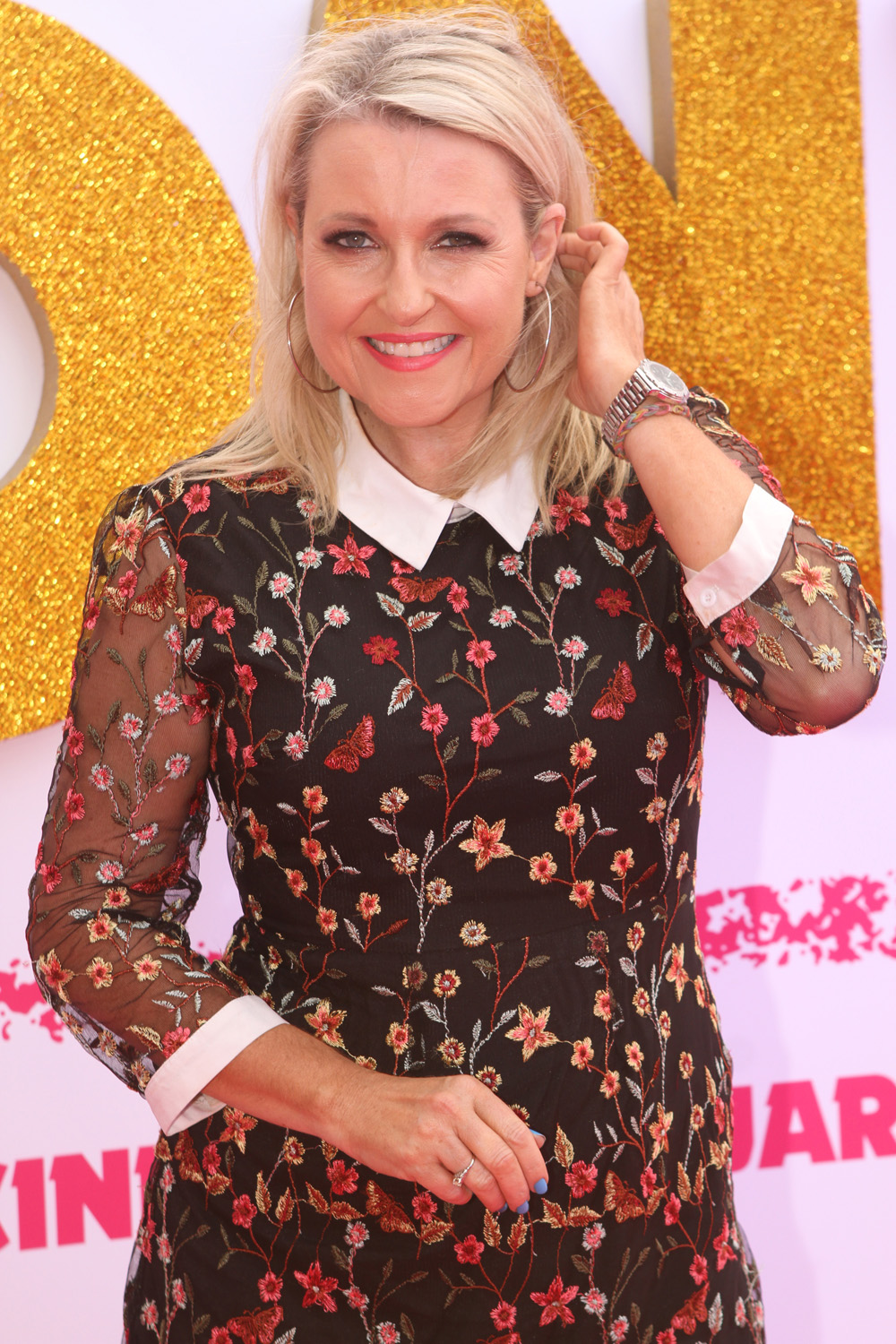
- Bishop in 2018
- Born: 6 September 1967 (age 59); Sydney, New South Wales, Australia
- Other names: Ang, Angie
- Occupations: Reporter, television presenter
- Years active: 1989–present
- Employer: Network 10
- Known for: Studio 10
- Spouse: Peter Baikie (m. 2005; died 2017)
- Children: 1
- Relatives: Bronwyn Bishop (mother)

Angela Bishop OAM (born 6 September 1967) is an Australian reporter and television presenter who presents the national news bulletin 10 News First: Midday, as well as 10 News: Afternoons and was a co-host and the entertainment presenter on Network 10's Studio 10.

== Career ==
Bishop commenced her work at Network Ten in 1989.

Bishop made two cameo appearances on American soap opera The Bold and the Beautiful in 2017 and 2018 respectively.

In 2018, Bishop joined Network 10's morning news, entertainment and lifestyle talk show Studio 10 as a regular panelist alongside Denise Scott, replacing Jessica Rowe. Making the panel now consist of Bishop, Denise Scott, Sarah Harris, Joe Hildebrand, Denise Drysdale, and Kerri-Ann Kennerley. In 2020, the show underwent a revamp after low viewership in order to become more like its competitors, Today, Sunrise and The Morning Show. Sarah Harris was named as a co-host alongside Dancing With The Stars judge Tristan MacManus, while Bishop stayed on the show, taking on the role as the entertainment presenter, and former 10 News Perth presenter Narelda Jacobs joined the show as the news presenter. In 2023, Bishop again became a co-host of Studio 10, after Sarah Harris's departure at the end of 2022.

At the end of 2023, the show was cancelled by 10 and did not return in 2024. However, Bishop was announced to be remaining on the Network and will be deployed into another role.

== Personal life ==
Bishop married Peter Baikie in 2005 and they had a daughter in 2007.

In 2016 Baikie was diagnosed with a rare form of cancer. He died in 2017.

Bishop is the daughter of former Australian politician Bronwyn Bishop and former NSW judge Alan Bishop.

Bishop was awarded the Medal of the Order of Australia in the 2021 Queen's Birthday Honours, for "service to entertainment journalism".
