= Penelope Rowe =

Australian writer

Penelope Rowe (26 April 1946 – ) is an Australian journalist.

Rowe was born in Sydney, a daughter of Mollie Windsor and Dr Harry Matthew John Windsor, who was born in Ireland.

She studied at the University of Sydney and graduated BA in 1967. She became a teacher, working in secondary schools and adult education. In 2004 she completed a Master of Criminology, also at the University of Sydney.

She worked as a journalist with ABC radio and "behind the scenes" with SBS television from around 1984.

As an author she has drawn inspiration from her struggles with bipolar illness, particularly in The Best of Times, the Worst of Times (2005), which she co-wrote with her daughter, television presenter and journalist Jessica Rowe.

Rowe is a sister of Gerard Windsor.

== Bibliography ==
- Dance for the Ducks 1976 — dedicated "To my husband, John, with love / and thanks"
- Tiger Country 1990
- Unacceptable Behaviour 1992 short stories
- Blood Songs 1997
- The Best of Times, The Worst of Times: Our Family's Journey with Bipolar 2005
