= George Negus Tonight =

2001–2004 Australian TV series

- Also known as: Dimensions
- Presented by: George Negus
- Country of origin: Australia
- Original language: English

Production
- Executive producer: Ivo Burum
- Camera setup: Various

Original release
- Network: ABC
- Release: 6 August 2001 – 25 November 2004

George Negus Tonight (formerly titled Dimensions) is an Australian current affairs television series hosted by George Negus, which ran on ABC Television from 2001 to 2004.

== Dimensions ==
The program was initially launched in 2001 as Dimensions, pitched as a low-cost stream of tenuously linked programs to run in the 6.30pm timeslot from Monday to Thursday before the ABC News 7pm bulletin. Dimensions had a particular focus for each day of the week: Monday was Media Dimensions, hosted by Annette Shun Wah, which focused on the Australian media; Tuesday was Health Dimensions, hosted by Dr Norman Swan, which concentrated on health matters; Wednesday was People Dimensions, hosted by James O'Loghlin, which profiled prominent Australians and overseas guests; and Thursday was Dimensions on the Move, hosted by Dave Morley, which looked at motor vehicles. Media Dimensions, People Dimensions and Dimensions on the Move were all axed in November

2002 saw the concept coming back with Swan's Health Dimensions, a revamped People Dimensions, now hosted by Jill Singer, Consumer Dimensions, hosted by Susanna Lobez, and a social history series Dimensions in Time, hosted by Guy Noble.

== New Dimensions and George Negus Tonight ==
The program was relaunched in June 2002 as was renamed New Dimensions with George Negus, with the veteran Australian journalist, George Negus, as the sole host, replacing the format of different hosts for each day, which the previous incarnations had used. During the following year, the program was renamed again George Negus Tonight. The program retained the different focus for each day: GNT History on Monday; GNT People on Tuesday; GNT Future on Wednesday and GNT Profiles on Thursday.

Despite high ratings for its timeslot (generally the highest ABC ratings in the 6:30pm slot), George Negus Tonight was axed by the ABC in November 2004, to make way for state-based programming. Negus went on to host Dateline on the SBS network.
