= Shitsville Express =

Australian television series

Shitsville Express is an Australian factual television series, produced by Cordell Jigsaw Zapruder Productions and broadcast in 2013 on ABC2.

The six-part series examines political issues such as the explosion of alcohol fuelled violence, the gambling epidemic, substandard transport systems, the current housing crisis and the pros and cons of coal seam gas mining. Journalist Joe Hildebrand takes four budding politicians on a confronting and thought-provoking journey into some of Australia's thorniest issues. At the end, all four put their ideas to a former Prime Minister who has dealt with many issues and who knows the difficulty of making change happen.

== Cast ==
- Jai Martinkovits, 26, is from Sydney and a member of the Liberal Party and a staunch monarchist.
- Francis Ventura, 22, is from Melbourne and has been volunteering for the Labor Party since he was nine years old and stood for the seat of Flinders in the 2010 Federal election.
- Madeleine Charles, 24, is a law student from Hobart and member of The Greens.
- Siobhan Harris, 21, is a libertarian from Melbourne and campaigner for the Australian Sex Party.

== Episodes ==
- Episode 1: Alcohol-fuelled violence
- Episode 2: The gambling epidemic
- Episode 3: The pros and cons of coal seam gas mining
- Episode 4: Substandard transport systems
- Episode 5: The Housing crisis

== See also ==
- Dumb, Drunk and Racist
- Go Back To Where You Came From
