= Gerard Windsor =

Australian author and literary critic (born 1944)

Gerard Charles Windsor (born 29 December 1944) is an Australian author and literary critic.

== Biography ==
Windsor was born in Sydney, son of Mollie and Capt. Harry Matthew John Windsor MD. Dr Windsor had immigrated with his father Harry Joseph Windsor to Brisbane, Queensland from Cork, Ireland sometime before 1932, qualified as a medical practitioner, served with the 2nd AIF in WWII and was elected Fellow of the Royal Australasian College of Surgeons in 1947.

Windsor was educated at St Ignatius' College, Riverview, dux in both 1961 and 1962, and a student of Melvyn Morrow. Windsor trained as a Jesuit from ages 18 to 24 before realizing it was not his vocation. He studied Arts at the Australian National University and Sydney University, before briefly studying medicine. He is a writer, having published ten books, including fiction, compilations of essays, and memoirs. Awarded the 2005 Pascall Prize for Critical Writing, he noted that "The primary responsibility of the review is to entertain the reader...The primary responsibility is not to the book or the movie or the play or whatever, which is not to be utterly amoral about it. But nevertheless, it should be a work whole in itself, and give pleasure." Windsor's novel, I Have Kissed Your Lips, was shortlisted for The Age Book of the Year award and longlisted for the 2005 Miles Franklin Award.

The author Penelope Rowe was a sister.

His son is film journalist Harry Windsor.

== Bibliography ==
=== Books ===
- Family Lore (1990) (memoir)
- The Harlots Enter First (1982) (stories)
- Memories of the Assassination Attempt and Other Stories (1985)
- Heaven Where The Bachelors Sit (1996) (memoir)
- That Fierce Virgin (1988) (novella)
- I'll Just Tell You This (1999) (memoir)
- I Asked Cathleen To Dance (1999) (memoir)
- The Mansions of Bedlam: Stories and Essays (2000)
- I Have Kissed Your Lips (2004) (novel)
- Ned Kelly and the Odd Rellie (2007) (clerihews)
- All day long the noise of battle : an Australian attack in Vietnam. Pier 9. 2011.
- The Tempest-Tossed Church: Being a Catholic Today (2017)

=== Critical studies and reviews of Windsor's work ===
All day long the noise of battle

- Holdsworth, Elizabeth (June 2011). "Knightly deeds in Vietnam". Australian Book Review (332): 70–71.

== Links ==
- Profile of Gerard Windsor, brisbanewritersfestival.com.au (2003)
- Culture and the Arts: Australia in Brief from the Department of Foreign Affairs and Trade
