= George Negus =

Australian journalist (1942–2024)

George Negus AM
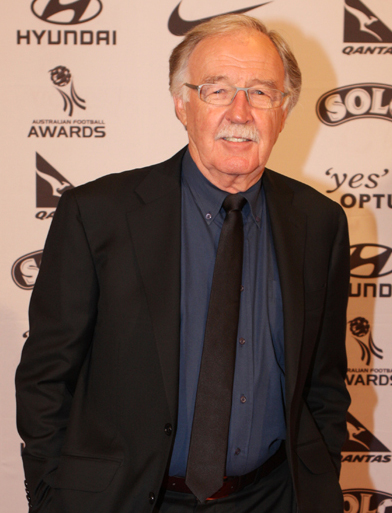
- Negus in 2011
- Born: 13 March 1942; Brisbane, Queensland, Australia
- Died: 15 October 2024 (aged 82); Sydney, Australia
- Education: University of Queensland
- Occupations: Journalist; author; television presenter; radio presenter
- Years active: 1967–2021
- Known for: 60 Minutes (1979–1986); Today Australia (1986–1990); Dateline (2005–2010); The Project (2009–2011); 6.30 with George Negus (2011)
- Partner: Kirsty Cockburn
- Children: 2
- Website: negusmedia.com.au

George Edward Negus (13 March 1942 – 15 October 2024) was an Australian journalist, author, television and radio presenter specialising in international affairs. He was a pioneer of Australian broadcast journalism, first appearing on the ABC's This Day Tonight and later on 60 Minutes. Negus was known for making complex international and political issues accessible to a broad audience through his down-to-earth, colloquial presentation style. His very direct interviewing technique occasionally caused confrontation, famously with Margaret Thatcher, but also led to some interviewees giving more information than they had given in other interviews. Recognition of his skills led to him hosting a new ABC show, Foreign Correspondent, and Dateline on SBS.

He often reported from the frontline of dangerous conflicts and described himself as an "anti-war correspondent" who wanted people to understand the reasons behind why wars were senseless. He was awarded a Walkley Award for Outstanding Contribution to Journalism. He presented 6.30 with George Negus on Network Ten. He remained a director of his own media consulting company, Negus Media International, until his death in 2024.

== Early life and education ==
Negus was born in Brisbane, Queensland, on 13 March 1942. He attended Inala State High School and Indooroopilly State High School, located in the Brisbane suburb of Indooroopilly in Queensland. After briefly working as a secondary school teacher, he obtained a diploma of journalism at the University of Queensland.

== Career ==
Negus was a high school teacher before writing for The Australian and The Australian Financial Review. He served as press secretary for Attorney-General Lionel Murphy during the Whitlam government. During his time as a political staffer he was most famous for having leaked to the press the imminent investigation of ASIO's headquarters by Murphy. The event became known as the 1973 Murphy raids.

=== Television journalism ===
Negus became most prominent as a reporter for This Day Tonight, a pioneering current affairs show on the ABC which began in 1967 and continued through the late 1960s and into the 1970s. Later, he was a founding correspondent for the Australian 60 Minutes program from 1979 until 1986 and then co-hosted Today Australia until 1990. In 1981, he gained some notoriety for a confrontational interview with British prime minister Margaret Thatcher, suggesting that British people thought of her as "pig-headed".

From 1992 until 1999, Negus was founding host of the ABC's foreign-themed current affairs Foreign Correspondent. From 1999 to 2001, Negus took a professional sabbatical and lived in Italy, writing a book, The World from Italy: Football, Food and Politics.

In 2002, Negus returned to the ABC to facilitate a pre-election panel and audience discussion program "Australia Talks" before commencing 3 years as host of the early evening timeslot George Negus Tonight covering "trends and issues with an Australia-wide team of reporters and producers". The show was cancelled in November 2004 due to changes in regional funding to the broadcaster.

In 2005, Negus went on to host Dateline on the SBS network. In 2011, after becoming a regular on Ten's evening news program The 7PM Project, produced by Roving Enterprises, he began hosting 6.30 with George Negus on Network Ten. When the show was cancelled after 200 episodes, he playfully and bluntly told his audience that the show had been cancelled because "not enough of you buggers watched us often enough."

== Books ==
Negus wrote several books, including one based on his time in Italy, and co-wrote a six-part series of children's books about Australian wildlife and geography with Kirsty Cockburn, his partner, in the early 1990s. His last book, The World from Down Under: A Chat with Recent History, was published 2010. His bestselling book The World from Islam, first published in 2003, is an investigation of the Islamic world as seen from Negus's travels in the Middle East. In The World from Islam, Negus defended Islam from claims of extremism, citing Islam's diversity.

== Personal life ==
Negus lived on a farm near Bellingen, on the New South Wales northern coast, until he was moved into a Sydney nursing home in late 2021 after being diagnosed with dementia. His partner, Kirsty Cockburn, was also a journalist and a collaborator on many of Negus's projects. They had two children, including a son, Serge, who appeared alongside Paul Hogan in Crocodile Dundee in Los Angeles (2001). Negus was a fan of soccer and a former board member of the national governing body Soccer Australia (as it was known at the time).

Negus died in Sydney on 15 October 2024, at the age of 82, following a battle with Alzheimer's disease.

== Honours ==
In the 2015 Australia Day Honours, Negus was appointed a Member of the Order of Australia (AM) "for significant service to the media as a journalist and television presenter, and to conservation and the environment."

== Bibliography ==
- Negus, George (2001). The World from Italy: Football, Food and Politics. Pymble, NSW: HarperCollins. ISBN 0732264472.
- —— (2003). The World from Islam: A Journey of Discovery Through the Muslim Heartland. Pymble, NSW: HarperCollins. ISBN 0732276233.
- —— (2010). The World from Down Under. Sydney: HarperCollins. ISBN 978-0730493914.
