= Dumb, Drunk and Racist =

Australian television series

Dumb, Drunk and Racist is an Australian TV factual series, produced by Cordell Jigsaw Productions and broadcast in 2012 on ABC2.

The six-part series examines negative stereotypes about Australians, held by people overseas, particularly in India. Journalist Joe Hildebrand takes four Indians on a road trip around Australia to determine whether Australians really are beer-swilling, stupid, racist bogans or whether they are simply misunderstood. The series is shot on location in India and across Australia and puts the Indian protagonists in the middle of passionate debates and immersive experiences that could change their opinion of Australia forever.

== Cast ==
- Gurmeet Singh, a civil servant, an officer of Indian Information Service in Government of India. Previously he worked with some TV channels i.e. DD News, TV9 Bharatvarsh and PTC News as Anchor.
- Mahima Bhardwaj, Call centre worker
- Amer Singh, third year law student
- Radhika Budhwar advises Indian students where they should study overseas

== See also ==
- Go Back To Where You Came From
- Shitsville Express
