= Jessica Rowe =

Australian journalist, author and television presenter (born 1970)

Jessica Rowe AM
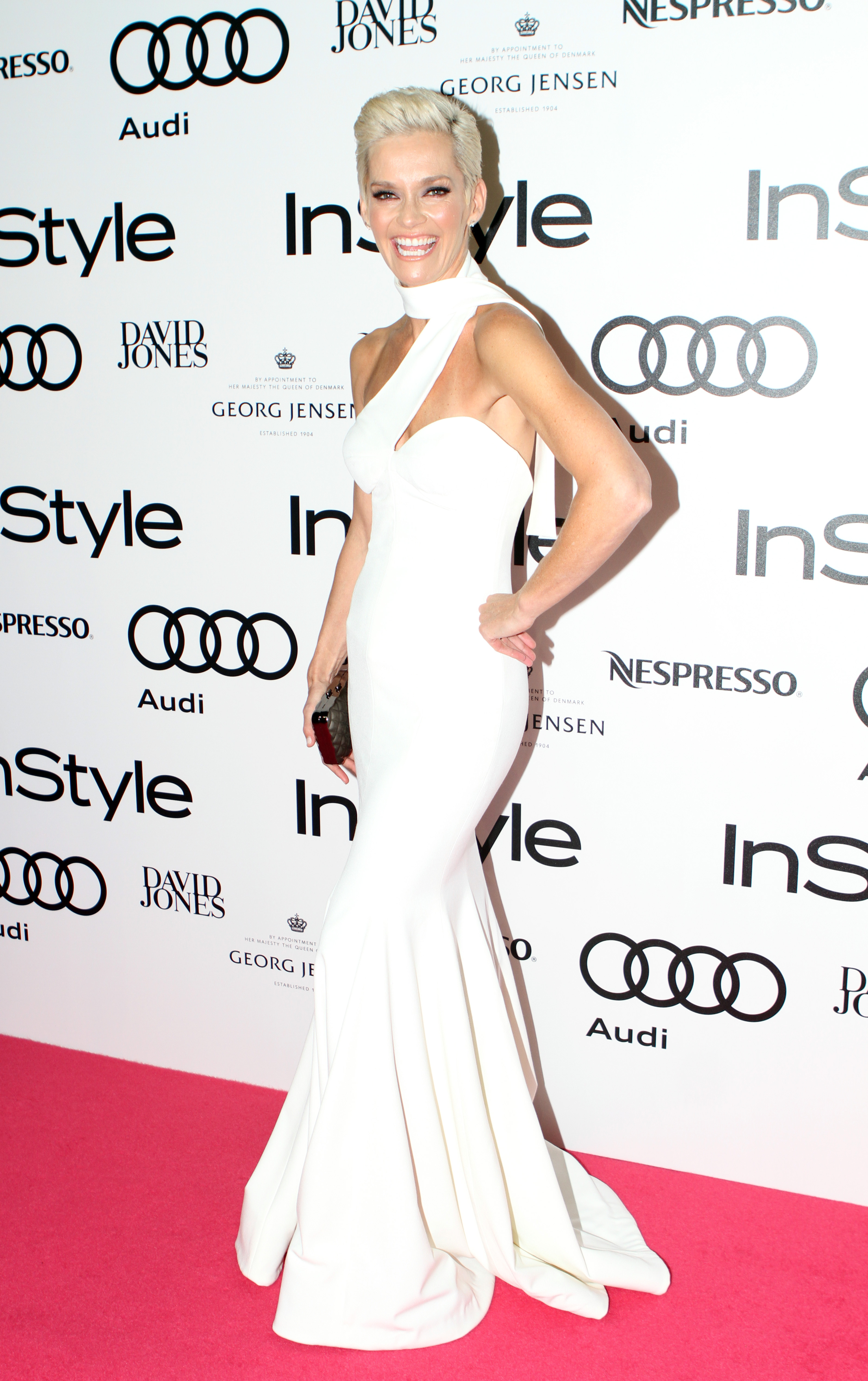
- Rowe at the 2015 Instyle Awards
- Born: Jessica June Rowe; 22 June 1970 (age 56); Sydney, New South Wales
- Education: Charles Sturt University; University of Sydney
- Occupations: Journalist; author; television presenter
- Years active: 1993–present
- Known for: Ten Eyewitness News (1996–2005); Today (2006–2007); Weekend Sunrise (2007–2013); Studio 10 (2013–2018)
- Spouse: Peter Overton (m. 2004)
- Children: 2
- Awards: Member of the Order of Australia (AM)
- Website: jessicarowe.com.au

Jessica June Rowe AM (born 22 June 1970) is an Australian journalist, author and television presenter. She was the co-host of Studio 10 on Network Ten until March 2018, and is Member of the Order of Australia for her mental health advocacy.

== Early life ==
Rowe attended Sydney Girls High School and Charles Sturt University, Bathurst, completing a Bachelor of Arts in 1993. During her studies she was a broadcaster with on-campus community radio station 2MCE-FM. Rowe later graduated from the University of Sydney with a Master of International Studies degree in 2003.

== Career ==
=== 1996–2005: Ten News at Five and The Best of Times, The Worst of Times ===
Rowe started work at the Nine Network as a receptionist and later as a weather presenter for Prime7. In 1996 she began working as a news presenter for Network Ten. She presented Ten Sydney's Ten News at Five bulletin alongside Ron Wilson. Rowe finished her hosting duties at Network Ten in 2005.

In October 2005, Rowe published her first book; The Best of Times, The Worst of Times (Allen & Unwin), a recollection of her experiences of her mother's battle with bipolar disorder. The book was co-written by Rowe's mother, Penelope Rowe.

=== 2006–2008: Today and move to the Seven Network ===
In 2006, Rowe joined the Nine Network to host the Today breakfast show, alongside Karl Stefanovic, replacing Tracy Grimshaw. Network Ten pursued legal action over Rowe's defection to the Nine Network, citing a clause within Network Ten's contract that prevented her from working with a competing broadcaster until June 2006. The case was dismissed by the Supreme Court on 30 December 2005, allowing Rowe to debut on Today on 30 January 2006.

Her arrival at Today was met with initial criticism, including "on-air giggling, absence of serious journalistic credentials and lack of chemistry with co-host Karl Stefanovic". Rowe was also criticised over an on-air gaffe involving Brigadier Michael Slater, which revealed during a live cross that the interview from Dili, East Timor, was being stage managed when Rowe tried to use old looting and violence footage, even though Slater told her it was a "couple of days old".

During this time Nine Network CEO Eddie McGuire made a public statement in June 2006 stating that the claims Rowe was to be "sacked" were part of "a malicious and unprecedented vilification campaign" This followed the sworn evidence in an affidavit from Nine Network's former head of news, Mark Llewellyn, that McGuire had threatened to "bone" Rowe during a meeting with executives.

On 6 May 2007, Rowe left the Nine Network due to "payment disputes" after her return from maternity leave.

In 2007, Rowe returned to TV and joined the Seven Network as a news presenter for Seven News in Sydney. She was also announced as a cast member on the seventh series of Dancing with the Stars alongside Patti Newton and Mark Beretta. Rowe finished seventh place on the show.

=== 2009–2012: Weekend Sunrise ===
In December 2010, Rowe was appointed news presenter on Weekend Sunrise replacing Sarah Cumming and Sharyn Ghidella. She also held other presenting roles on the Seven Network until her departure from the network in 2013.

In 2011, Rowe published Love, Wisdom, Motherhood (Allen & Unwin), a collection of her interviews with other Australian mothers on their experiences with motherhood. The book included interviews with Quentin Bryce, Lisa McCune, Wendy Harmer and Tina Arena.

In April 2012, Rowe appeared as the narrator in the stage production of Side By Side By Sondheim at the Theatre Royal in Sydney as part of a gala concert featuring Ruthie Henshall. The gala was held to support White Ribbon Australia, a charity which seeks to raise awareness of violence against women. This was part of an ongoing tour, which had started in April 2011 at Sydney's Seymour Centre.

=== 2013–2018: Studio 10 ===
In September 2013, Rowe returned to Network Ten to co-host their new morning TV show Studio 10. The show premiered on 4 November 2013 and alongside Rowe were fellow co-hosts Ita Buttrose, Sarah Harris and Joe Hildebrand. In 2015 the show welcomed Denise Drysdale as its fifth co-host. On 12 October 2016 it came in second on the OzTAM TV ratings. Studio 10 is on air 8.30am – 12.00pm Monday – Friday on Network Ten.

In January 2015, Rowe was announced as a Member of the Order of Australia at 2015 Australia Day honours for her mental health advocacy. She said she was "incredibly humbled and just blessed" to receive the honour and joked, "I was hoping I might get a tiara. It's the little girl in me!"

In July 2015, Rowe played The Empress in Bonnie Lythgoe's stage production of Aladdin and his Wondrous Lamp at the State Theatre in Sydney, Australia. Ian Dickson and Beau Ryan also appeared in the production.

In August 2015, Rowe published her memoir Is This My Beautiful Life? (Allen & Unwin), in which she shared insights into her professional career as well as her battles with postnatal depression. The Sydney Morning Herald said "The impact of her revealing memoir should not be underestimated."

In September 2015, Rowe fronted a television and print campaign for Woolworths supermarkets. She had worked as a checkout assistant at her local Woolworths supermarket during her schooling years in 1987.

In March 2018, Rowe announced her departure from Studio 10, citing a desire to spend more time with her children. However it is widely reported that Rowe did not leave the station voluntarily but instead Network Ten was planning to fire Rowe for over a year.

=== Podcast ===
In August 2021, Rowe launched The Jess Rowe Big Talk Show Podcast produced by LiSTNR. The podcast uncovers the hidden struggles of famous individuals who, despite their success, face the same challenges as everyone else.

=== Pauline Hanson interview ===
In September 2021, Rowe interviewed Australian senator Pauline Hanson about her personal life and political experiences on The Jess Rowe Big Talk Show Podcast.

Rowe was criticised by various activists for airing the podcast, with 2021 Australian of the Year Grace Tame saying that "Pauline doesn't need help to be heard, but those whose oppression she's both driven and reinforced do." Rowe initially defended the interview, saying that she "disagreed with Hanson's politics" and that the interview was "about Hanson dealing with some of the darkest moments in her life and the resilience she has built". Later, however, Rowe removed the episode from her podcast, issuing an apology via Twitter and thanking Tame and Indigenous comedian Nakkiah Lui for their comments.

The Indigenous activist and former Labor Party president turned Liberal Party candidate, Warren Mundine, then criticised Rowe's removal of the interview, saying "You are supposed to be a journalist. You only listened to the cancel free speech mob." Rowe's decision to remove the podcast was also criticised by media commentators such as Tim Blair, Joe Hildebrand, Chris Uhlmann, Paul Barry, Peter van Onselen and Neil Mitchell.

== Personal life ==
Rowe is married to Australian television journalist and Nine News Sydney presenter Peter Overton and has two children.

After the birth of her first daughter and as a result of her legal battle with Nine Network, Rowe suffered from post-natal depression. She also stated that separate to her more recent postpartum depression, she had previously been on anti-depressant medication and had been receiving psychiatric therapy for clinical depression, anxiety disorder and panic attacks.

Rowe has said of her use of anti-depressants and counselling; "To me, asking for help is one of the bravest and best things you can ever do. It saved me." She is an advocate for mental health awareness and initiatives and is an ambassador and spokesperson for Beyondblue.
