= 6.30 with George Negus =

2011 Australian news TV series

- 6.30 with George Negus logo
- Also known as: 6PM with George Negus (until 4 April 2011)
- Presented by: George Negus (Monday – Thursday); Hugh Riminton or Hamish Macdonald (Friday)
- Country of origin: Australia
- Original language: English
- No. of seasons: 1
- No. of episodes: 200

Production
- Executive producer: Tony Ritchie
- Producer: Ten News
- Production locations: Sydney, New South Wales, Australia
- Running time: 30 minutes

Original release
- Network: Network Ten
- Release: 24 January – 28 October 2011

6.30 with George Negus is an Australian television current affairs program that was broadcast on Network Ten. It aired at 6:30 pm from Monday to Friday and was presented by George Negus (Monday – Thursday) and Hugh Riminton or Hamish Macdonald (Friday) from the TEN studios in Pyrmont, Sydney.

It premiered at 6:00 pm on 24 January 2011. On 19 October 2011 Network Ten officially announced that 6.30 with George Negus had been cancelled as a result of low ratings. The final episode of the series aired on 28 October 2011 in what was the show's 200th episode. The series was replaced by an extended version of The 7PM Project which was consequently retitled as The Project.

== History ==
In August 2010, Network Ten announced that it would spend an additional $20 million per year to strengthen its news and current affairs output. Those changes included launching a 6pm national current affairs program, followed by local half-hour news bulletins at 6:30pm.

On 8 October 2010, it was announced that George Negus would leave SBS's Dateline to join Network Ten. Negus confirmed a day later that he would be hosting Ten's new 6pm program. The first edition of 6PM with George Negus aired on Monday 24 January 2011.

In March 2011, Network Ten announced that it would be moving the program to 6:30pm in an effort to address persistently poor ratings for its early evening schedule. The changes, introduced on Monday 4 April 2011, led to Ten's local news bulletins at 5:00pm being extended by a further 30 minutes with Negus' program in direct competition with the Nine Network's A Current Affair and the Seven Network's Today Tonight.

On 19 October 2011, Network Ten announced that they had cancelled the program and replace it with an hour-long version of The 7PM Project, renamed The Project at 6:30pm after very poor ratings. The 200th and final ever edition of 6.30 with George Negus aired on Friday 28 October 2011.

== Reporters ==
6.30 with George Negus's reporters included:

- Senior Foreign Correspondent: Hamish Macdonald
- Political Editor: Hugh Riminton
- Environment: Emily Rice
- Consumer: Eddy Meyer
- Sydney: Danielle Isdale
- Melbourne: Meggie Palmer
- Brisbane: Max Futcher
- United States: Emma Dallimore

== Reception ==
The first episode of 6PM with George Negus aired on 24 January 2011 to an average of 605,000 viewers ranking it 18th for the day. This was over the half a million target set by the show's executive producer, Tony Ritchie. The program was third-placed in its timeslot behind Seven News and Nine News. Colin Vickery from the Herald Sun commented on how fast-paced the show was, but concluded that the show "got off to a serviceable start tonight – but it seriously needs to slow down and take the time to live up to it's [sic] host's promises". Tim Dick from the Sydney Morning Herald also noted the rushed nature of the show and stated that Negus "deserves more time".

Nightly ratings for the program deteriorated in the weeks following the first broadcast, with the program ranking outside the top 100 weekly programs from its third week onwards, and its average audience falling below 400,000 viewers each night. However, after the timeslot shift, by July 2011 audience numbers had risen and stabilised to just below 500,000 viewers each night.
