= The Project (Australian TV program) =

Australian news entertainment television program

- Genre: Current affairs, news, and entertainment
- Developed by: Roving Enterprises
- Presented by: Carrie Bickmore; Charlie Pickering; Dave Hughes; Peter Helliar; Rove McManus; Waleed Aly; Gorgi Coghlan; Anthony "Lehmo" Lehmann; Hamish Macdonald; Tommy Little; Lisa Wilkinson; Peter van Onselen; Georgie Tunny; Sarah Harris; Sam Taunton; Michael Hing; Steve Price; Rachel Corbett; Kate Langbroek; Susie Youssef
- Country of origin: Australia
- Original language: English
- No. of series: 17
- No. of episodes: 4,504

Production
- Executive producers: Craig Campbell; Chris Bendall
- Camera setup: Multi-camera
- Running time: 60 minutes
- Production companies: Roving Enterprises; 7PM Company

Original release
- Network: Network 10
- Release: 20 July 2009 – 27 June 2025

Related
- 10 News

The Project (previously The 7PM Project from 2009 to 2011) is an Australian news, current affairs, and talk show television panel program which was broadcast by Network 10 in Australia, produced by Roving Enterprises. The show's final hosting lineup consisted of Waleed Aly, Sarah Harris, Georgie Tunny, Hamish Macdonald, Rove McManus, Sam Taunton and Susie Youssef with rotating daily panellists usually appearing once a week.

The one-hour show, formerly half-hour, premiered on 20 July 2009 and aired live nightly excluding Saturdays, in the eastern states with delays in other states (including Queensland during daylight saving). It was broadcast Monday to Friday from Network 10's studio in The Como Centre, South Yarra, Melbourne and Sundays from Network 10's Sydney studios at Pyrmont. The Project drew its content and comedy from recent news stories and offered a sometimes alternative view to mainstream, sponsored news stories. It ran for 51 weeks of the year, taking brief breaks during the Christmas and New Year period.

The Project has won numerous accolades, 11 Logie Awards, including the Gold Logie won by hosts Carrie Bickmore and Waleed Aly.

On 9 June 2025, Network 10 confirmed that The Project would be replaced by a new current affairs program titled 10 News+, as the network was preparing to phase out its long-running show effective 30 June. The final episode of the series aired on 27 June 2025.

Following the conclusion of the program, The Project's social media accounts remained active, with several posts being made in the weeks following the finale.

== Format ==
The program's final hosting lineup consisted of Waleed Aly, Sarah Harris, Georgie Tunny, Hamish Macdonald, Rove McManus, Sam Taunton and Susie Youssef and featured other regular panellists appearing during the week. Regular panellists and contributors have included: Kate Langbroek, Steve Price, Nick Cody, James Mathison, Ruby Rose, Susie Youssef, Liz Ellis, Max Rushden, Hugh Riminton, Chrissie Swan, Elise Elliott, Narelda Jacobs, Dave Thornton, Tom Cashman, Kitty Flanagan, Nikki Britton, Nazeem Hussain, Chris Brown, Dilruk Jayasinha, Nath Valvo, Myf Warhurst, Jan Fran, Alex Lee, Claire Hooper, Jessie Stephens, Tara Rushton, Natarsha Belling, Tom Tilley and Sharyn Ghidella. The hosts were often joined by several special guests during the course of an episode.

The main content of the show revolved around the hosts and panellists at the desk discussing some of the news events of the day. This discussion often involved live crosses to reporters or guests via satellite. Special guests, often of a celebrity nature, also regularly appeared in studio, usually during each show's final segments. In addition, the show featured pre-recorded interviews with celebrities, conducted by either one of the main cast or US entertainment correspondents Jonathan Hyla or Xavier Brinkman. Feature stories by the main cast, often of a humorous but insightful nature, were also prominent throughout each week.

== Hosts ==
Presenters	Seasons																
Presenters	2009	2010	2011	2012	2013	2014	2015	2016	2017	2018	2019	2020	2021	2022	2023	2024	2025
Carrie Bickmore	Host	Host	Host	Host	Host	Host	Host	Host	Host	Host	Host	Host	Host	Host			
Charlie Pickering	Host	Host	Host	Host	Host	Host											
Dave Hughes	Host	Host	Host	Host	Host												
Peter Helliar						Host	Host	Host	Host	Host	Host	Host	Host	Host			
Rove McManus						Host									Host	Host	Host
Waleed Aly							Host	Host	Host	Host	Host	Host	Host	Host	Host	Host	Host
Gorgi Coghlan							Host	Host	Host	Host	Host	Host	Host				
Hamish MacDonald								Host	Host	Host	Host		Host	Host	Host	Host	Host
Tommy Little									Host	Host	Host	Host	Host	Host			
Lisa Wilkinson										Host	Host	Host	Host	Host			
Peter van Onselen												Host	Host				
Georgie Tunny														Host	Host	Host	Host
Sarah Harris															Host	Host	Host
Sam Taunton															Host	Host	Host
Michael Hing															Host	Host	
Susie Youssef																	Host

Presenter	Role	Days	Tenure
Dave Hughes	Co-host	Monday–Thursday	2009–2013
Charlie Pickering	Co-host	Monday–Friday	2009–2014
Gorgi Coghlan	Co-host	Friday	2015–2021
Peter van Onselen	Co-host	Friday–Sunday	2020–2021
Lisa Wilkinson	Co-host	Thursday–Sunday	2018–2022
Carrie Bickmore	Co-host	Monday–Wednesday	2009–2022
Peter Helliar	Co-host	Monday–Thursday	2014–2022
Tommy Little	Co-host	Friday & Sunday	2017–2022
Michael Hing	Co-host	Friday & Sunday	2023–2024
Rove McManus	Co-host	Friday	2014, 2023–2025
Hamish MacDonald	Co-host	Sunday	2016–2019, 2021–2025
Susie Youssef	Co-host	Friday	2025
Waleed Aly	Co-host	Monday–Thursday	2015–2025
Georgie Tunny	Co-host	Thursday–Friday	2022–2025
Sarah Harris	Co-host	Sunday–Wednesday	2023–2025
Sam Taunton	Co-host	Sunday–Thursday	2023–2025

On 8 December 2013, it was announced that regular host Dave Hughes was leaving The Project in order to concentrate on his stand-up comedy routine with a national tour in 2014. For his final appearance on the show on 11 December, Hughes was given an emotional farewell by co-hosts Bickmore and Pickering.

On 12 March 2014, Pickering announced that he would be leaving the show on 7 April 2014. McManus co-hosted the show from 18 August 2014 until the end of the year, alongside Helliar and Bickmore. McManus finished on the show on Thursday 4 December 2014.

Gorgi Coghlan co-hosted the show on Friday nights until 2017, she was replaced by Lisa Wilkinson. Coghlan remained on the show as a panellist on Friday nights and as a regular fill-in presenter until May 2021.

Hamish Macdonald regularly hosted The Sunday Project from 2016 to January 2019 until he was replaced by Peter van Onselen because of his Q+A filming commitments. Macdonald continued to feature as a panellist on the show, amongst his ABC commitments, and in June 2021 he announced that he would return as co-host of The Sunday Project in September 2021, while Peter van Onselen returned to his commitments as Network Ten's political editor.

On 11 October 2022, Carrie Bickmore announced her resignation from the show after 13 years and that her final appearance the regular host would be on 30 November 2022. Lisa Wilkinson also announced on 20 November 2022 that the she was leaving her hosting position on the show, effective immediately, after six months of "relentless, targeted toxicity". Peter Helliar announced on 22 November 2022 that he would be leaving the show, the third regular presenter to quit the show within the year. His last day presenting was on 7 December 2022. Tommy Little also finished up hosting the show at the end of 2022.

In November 2022, it was announced that Sarah Harris would join the show to replace Bickmore in 2023. In December 2022, it was revealed that Sam Taunton would join the show to replace Helliar and co-host on Mondays to Thursdays alongside Aly and Harris, while Michael Hing co-host on Friday and Sundays, replacing Little. Rove MacManus returned to a co-hosting position on Friday nights in early 2023.

In December 2024, Hing announced his departure from the program in 2025. He was replaced by Susie Youssef on Friday nights, with Taunton now hosting Sunday nights in addition to his previous days.

=== Substitutes ===
- Waleed Aly: Hamish Macdonald, Georgie Tunny, Liz Ellis, Michael Hing, Rove McManus, Max Rushden and Hugh Riminton.
- Sarah Harris: Georgie Tunny, Chrissie Swan, Liz Ellis, Rachel Corbett, Elise Elliott and Narelda Jacobs.
- Sam Taunton / Susie Youssef: Dave Hughes, Dave Thornton, Tom Cashman, Nikki Britton, Nazeem Hussain, Dilruk Jayasinha, Nath Valvo, Myf Warhurst, Alex Lee, Claire Hooper, Rove McManus and Nick Cody.
- Georgie Tunny: Rachel Corbett, Sarah Harris, Tara Rushton, Liz Ellis, Elise Elliott, Sharyn Ghidella and Susie Youssef.
- Hamish Macdonald: Waleed Aly, Michael Hing, Rove McManus, Rachel Corbett, Tara Rushton, Georgie Tunny, Max Rushden and Hugh Riminton.
- Rove McManus: Hamish Macdonald, Waleed Aly, Susie Youssef, Michael Hing, Tom Tilley, Liz Ellis, Tara Rushton, Rachel Corbett, Max Rushden and Hugh Riminton.

== Panellists ==
- Ruby Rose – Entertainment reporter and panellist (2009)
- James Mathison – Reporter and panellist (2009–2010)
- Scott Pape – Money Shot (2009–2010)
- Rove McManus – Roving reporter (2009–2010)
- George Negus – Panellist (2010–2011, 2012)
- Denise Scott – Panellist (2010–2011, 2022)
- Andrew Rochford – Panellist and fill-in presenter (2010–2014, 2017, 2019, 2020)
- Kitty Flanagan – Eye on Tuesday (2009–2014)
- Sam Mac – Roving reporter (2010–2015)
- Natasha Stott Despoja – Panellist (2013–2015, 2017, 2019)
- Mia Freedman – Panellist (2013–2014)
- Todd Sampson – Panellist (2014–2016)
- Jennifer Byrne – Panellist (2011–2016)
- Gretel Killeen – Panellist (2014–2017)
- Meshel Laurie – Panellist (2014–2019)
- Anthony "Lehmo" Lehmann – Panellist (2011–2018)
- Fifi Box – Panellist (2014–2019, 2021)
- Ryan Fitzgerald – Panellist (2010–2020)
- Gorgi Coghlan – Panellist (2010–2021)
- Em Rusciano – Panellist (2011–2022)
- Chrissie Swan – Panellist (2011–2015, 2019–2022)
- Julie Goodwin – Panellist (2022–2023)
- Rachel Corbett – Panellist (2015–2025)
- Steve Price – Panellist (2010–2025)
- Kate Langbroek – Panellist (2014–2025)
- Nick Cody – Panellist (2023–2025)

== Correspondents ==
- Lucy McDonald – UK
- Phoebe Bowden – UK (10 News First Correspondent)
- Eammon Atkinson – US (10 News First Correspondent)
- Jonathan Hyla – US
- Michael Williams – US

== History ==
=== Series 1: 2009 ===
The program premiered on 20 July 2009 and aired as a live broadcast on weeknights from 7:00 to 7:30 pm. Roving Enterprises, the production company owned by Rove McManus and Craig Campbell, produces the series. The promos of the show used musical samples of Hello from The Cat Empire.

The premiere episode featured MasterChef Australia season one winner Julie Goodwin and an interview with Sienna Miller and Rachel Nichols. During the first season Ruby Rose and James Mathison were credited as part of the main cast, though their contributions were often limited to guest appearances and pre-recorded interviews.

During the 2009 summer, in order to increase the profile of the show, Monday and Friday episodes were extended to an hour and the program was repeated in a late night (11 pm) timeslot to attract late night viewers who may have missed the show earlier in the evening. In addition, from 30 November 2009, the show underwent a small visual revamp. With the lights getting brighter, the set was changed to accommodate a more "summery" feel with the background displaying a blue sky and the foreground featuring more orange and brown lighting, skewing away from the dark, night-time feel from the start of the show. New titles were also added to fit the feel. As of 8 February 2010, Channel 10 cancelled the late-night repeat of the show. Ten's summer late night repeats of 7PM were always a part of its strategy to win more followers for the show.

=== Series 2: 2010 ===
For 2010's non-daylight saving time period, the visuals reverted to display a more night time feel or reflection, however not to the extent as was seen in 2009 with orange and brown lighting still accompanying the set. A large screen was also added to the background.

In 2010, Carrie Bickmore and Charlie Pickering were nominated for the Logie of Most Popular New Female and Most Popular Male Talent respectively. Ten announced in June 2010 that the series had been renewed for another year.

On 20 July 2010, the show celebrated its first year on air with regulars Kitty Flanagan and Steve Price and MasterChef evictee, Alvin Quah. The celebratory show commenced with a look back at the shows first moments on air a year beforehand.

For the week starting 27 December 2010, the show went into a summer series entitled The Holiday Project. It lasted for five episodes (as this was the length of time the show took a break) and featured Charlie Pickering and Dave Hughes sitting in front of the set reviewing some of the more popular segments, news stories and events of the show in 2010 while infrequently crossing to the Ten News room for the day's headlines. Carrie Bickmore and all other guest presenters did not feature in the series.

=== Series 3: 2011 ===
The show returned on 3 January 2011. However, due to the death of Carrie Bickmore's husband, guest presenters replaced her during January. Bickmore returned on 14 February 2011. George Negus effectively finished his stint as a regular guest panellist on the show in January 2011 when he began to host his new current affairs program, 6PM with George Negus (later 6.30 with George Negus).

On 10 March 2011 it was revealed the show scored an exclusive interview with embattled US actor Charlie Sheen to be hosted by Nova personality and 7PM Project regular Scott Dooley. It was the only Australian interview with the star and also tentatively the last interview to be conducted with Sheen in light of his supposed breakdown after having his Two and a Half Men contract terminated.

The interview was shown on the show as an exclusive on 11 March 2011 with Dooley interviewed personally on the show the night before. The airing of the exclusive interview coincidentally occurred while Sheen's house was raided by police.

In light of the wedding of Prince William and Catherine Middleton, Ten aired a special wedding coverage special of The 7PM Project titled The Wedding Project that ran for an hour on 29 April 2011. It aired to lacklustre ratings.

On 9 June 2011, "St Kilda Schoolgirl" Kim Duthie, who infamously told media that she had "slept" with AFL player agent Ricky Nixon, appeared on the program in a pre-recorded interview in which she said that comments she made earlier in the day, when she told media that she was "lying" about her accusations. The interview made headlines when an off-air comment by Duthie stating that "everything [she] said, [she] lied about", referring to her interview with the show, was shown live during the episode after the airing of the interview.

Approaching its second anniversary, the program scheduled numerous special episodes which were rumoured to have been scheduled to combat a drop in ratings due to strong competition. From 11 July 2011 and running for a week, various Australian politicians joined the panel and co-hosted an entire episode. Politicians included Prime Minister Julia Gillard, MP Bob Katter and Greens politician Adam Bandt.

For the week starting 18 July 2011, the program also invited members of the general public, who have strong opinions on various current events, to join the panel.

On 18 July 2011, the program celebrated its 500th episode. It featured "Your Chair" panellist Louise Benjamin, Jennifer Byrne and all three regular panellists. Two days later, on 20 July 2011, the program celebrated its second year on air with "Your Chair" panellist Kim Forrester, Andrew Rochford and all three regular panellists.

The show commemorated the tenth anniversary of the September 11 attacks with a series of stories detailing how people affected by the event have coped over the past 10 years.

Regular guest Tom Ballard was given a regular Thursday segment entitled "Resident Expert" in September 2011. It is similar in style to Kitty Flanagan's Tuesday segment in which Ballard discusses a news story based on a recent scientific, statistical, social or medical study in humour.

On 19 October 2011, Network 10 announced the program would be moved from 7 pm to 6:30 pm (replacing the axed 6.30 with George Negus), extended to one-hour and renamed The Project. The first edition of the new hour-long program aired on 31 October 2011.

As in previous years, Channel Ten continued to air The Project over summer in a bid to gain more of an audience share, particularly due to the lack of other new content of rival networks. The Project took a short break over the Christmas period and was replaced by a special "best of" series of the show, a compilation of episodes from the past year.

=== Series 4: 2012 ===
The Project returned on 2 January 2012 with new episodes.

On 22 January 2012, the show added a half-hour edition on Sundays which airs at 6 pm. The hourly editions aired on weeknights will also shift to 6 pm as of the following day, 23 January 2012, and remain at an hour in length. It will be the second move for the show in three months.

In addition, the show has added a weekly weather update segment accommodated into its new Sunday show.

On 14 February 2012 (Valentine's Day), actress and comedian Magda Szubanski came onto the show to tell the panel that she 'identified as gay' in support for gay marriage. On the show, she said, 'I absolutely identify as gay ... and it must be hard for people who don't experience it to know what the pressures of being gay are.'

On 8 March 2012, in addition to its regular episode at 6 PM, a special episode showcasing an unedited version of the movie Kony 2012 along with some discussion was aired at 8 PM as part of the global social-network campaign phenomenon asking for the arrest of Ugandan rebels leader Joseph Kony.

The show was nominated for Most Popular Light Entertainment Program and Most Outstanding Light Entertainment Program in the 2012 Logie Awards. Newsreader Carrie Bickmore was nominated for Most Popular Television Presenter and the Gold Logie. These nominations were announced on 18 March 2012.

From 24 to 29 June 2012, The Project was broadcast from Sydney with stars such as Carrie Underwood and Katy Perry joining the panel at the desk for the first time.

On 12 July 2012, Carrie Bickmore and her co-hosts became very emotional after airing a story about 31-year-old Queensland mother Emma Rathie who had been diagnosed with terminal cancer and whose son Blake had embarked on completing a 'bucket-list' of experiences that he and his mother could have before the end of her life. With donations and support via Facebook, Rathie and her son were able to experience several of the items on the list before her death in September 2012. On 7 August 2012, guest Will Ferrell found himself speaking via video link to PM Julia Gillard. Unsure of how to address the prime minister, Ferrell asked 'can I just call you Jules?'. He then proceeded to ask Gillard for advice on how to improve his hair, to which she suggested that he take himself to a hair-dresser right away and spend 'buckets and buckets of money on in-salon treatments'.

Pickering took time off in late October to cover the US election and for personal leave. Hughes will take leave in December.

On 29 August 2012, Carrie Bickmore mispronounced the word 'Qantas' as 'Cuntas' during a reading of the news headlines. (The first syllable of the mispronounced word sounded too vulgar for broadcast.) The incident went viral with a YouTube video of the moment garnering more than 250,000 views.

On 25 November 2012, the final half-hour Sunday edition aired and it was hosted by Carrie Bickmore and Andrew Rochford along with panellists Magdalena Roze and Anthony 'Lehmo' Lehmann.

During 2012, The Project were awarded numerous awards, including the Yooralla Media Award of Distinction at the National Disability Awards.

With the axing of Breakfast, the encores of The Project moved from 5 am weekday mornings to following the TEN Late News.

=== Series 5: 2013 ===
The Project returned with new episodes on 31 December 2012 for its 2013 season. It was the first time the show had begun a new season before the new year, and the first time episodes had been broadcast on New Year's Eve and Day.

In response to the 2013 Queensland Floods, on 28 January The Project aired a separate live edition special into the state of Queensland. As Queenslanders usually watch The Project on a one-hour delay (due to time zones), this meant that the team could tape a separate live edition of the show immediately after the main show and still air it in Queensland at the usual time of 6.30 pm. Due to these circumstances, the main show, which was still broadcast to the rest of Australia that night, did not air in Queensland.

The Project was nominated for three Logie Awards at the 2013 ceremony with newsreader Bickmore again picking up two nominations for the Gold Logie and Silver Logie for Most Popular Presenter, and the show earning a nomination in the Most Popular Light Entertainment Program category. Bickmore nor The Project won either category.

On Tuesday, 9 April, Sex Pistols star John Lydon caused controversy after his erratic behaviour during an interview. When host Carrie Bickmore asked him about his views on the recent death of Margaret Thatcher, Lydon told her to shut up continuously before telling her that 'when a man is talking, you don't interrupt', a quote that drew considerable gasps from the audience. Bickmore apologised and asked him the question again, however this time Lydon accused her of being an 'in-dreadfully loud bird' he doesn't like. Bickmore aired her offence at the comment, however Lydon continued to tell her how loud she was being and how she shouldn't be 'yelling' and should 'learn what manners and respect is', drawing more gasps from the audience. After rejecting Bickmore's request to ask the question a third time, telling her to 'taper her voice' down 'a couple of thousand notches', fellow co-host Andrew Rochford stepped in, even trying to ask if Lydon's rant was based on Bickmore's gender, however Lydon accused the panel of yelling into his earpiece 'like excitable children'. He began to get arrogant and erratic, and after a heckle from co-host Dave Hughes, Bickmore tried asking the question one more time. When Lydon continually made jibes about the volume of her, and the other hosts' voice, Dave Hughes swiftly ended the interview by thanking Lydon for his time, however he left the interview telling the panel that they're 'done'. Bickmore has since admitted that she wanted to scream at Lydon after his sexist remarks, agreeing with Rochford's claim that Lydon was a misogynist pig.

The show's 1,000th episode went to air on 30 April 2013.

On 2 May, Carrie Bickmore became emotional when speaking about the awareness of brain cancer following a story about a potential cure for the disease in ten years' time. Bickmore lost her husband to brain cancer in 2010 and this episode marked the first time Bickmore addressed her own experiences with the illness on-air. Bickmore stated that she didn't "think people realize the mental and physical impact that it has on people, on patients, over a long period of time as the disease progresses." While it wasn't the first time Bickmore has broken down on air, this moment was highly publicized due to the context.

On Saturday 7 September, the program aired an election special titled The Election Project with Hugh Riminton. This is the second election The Project has covered the election, however this edition ran from the time the booths closed on the Eastern Seaboard until approximately 10.30 pm when the majority of polling results were locked in. Despite time differences across the country, The Project aired live into all markets, starting earlier for states away from the Eastern Seaboard. This is opposed to the one-hour edition of the show that ran during the 2010 election, half an hour of which did not air in South Australia and none of which aired in Western Australia. The 4-hour and 20-minute broadcast of The Project was the show's longest in its history.

On 1 November, British singer and presenter Melanie Brown was forced to cancel a planned appearance on The Project as a guest co-host after Ch-7 threatened legal action against her, citing that Brown was still under contract with Seven and not authorised to make appearances on rival networks.

On 24 November, US actor-comedian Will Ferrell was a guest co-host appearing in character as newsreader Ron Burgundy from the film Anchorman 2: The Legend Continues which Ferrell was visiting Australia to promote. Burgundy traded quips with co-host Ray Martin, saying that if the two were competing, he would take Martin out for lunch and cocktails and then sabotage the brakes on his car.

On 8 December 2013, it was announced that regular host Dave Hughes was quitting The Project in order to concentrate on his stand-up comedy routine with a national tour in 2014. His final appearance on the show was 11 December 2013.

=== Series 6: 2014 ===
On 13 January 2014, new co-host Peter Helliar made his debut on The Project to mixed reviews. On 12 March 2014, Charlie Pickering announced he was leaving the show on 7 April 2014, the second presenter to do so in less than six months. On 14 July 2014, Ten announced Rove McManus would replace Pickering for the rest of the year alongside Helliar and Bickmore. He left on 4 December 2014.

During the final broadcast of her "Eye on..." segment on 9 December 2014, Kitty Flanagan made controversy after claiming Santa Claus didn't exist. The comments caused outrage from viewers who claimed the show's early-evening timeslot meant children were most likely watching at the time. The program apologised for the comments and the following night's broadcast included a 'live cross' to Santa in the North Pole.

In December 2014, Waleed Aly was announced as the permanent co-host. He commenced in his new role on 26 January 2015.

=== Series 7: 2015 ===
In September 2015, Andrew Guy became Australia's first openly transgender TV host, as a guest presenter on The Project.

In November 2015, Waleed Aly attacked the extremist group Islamic State of Iraq and the Levant in a five-minute piece titled 'What ISIL wants'. The segment was produced in the wake of the November 2015 Paris attacks, with Aly labelling ISIS as 'bastards' and calling for everyone to come together as one against them. This video received strong media exposure, and many online views.

=== Series 9: 2017 ===
From 27 August 2017, the show began airing on Sunday nights for the first time since 2012. The new Sunday edition, entitled The Sunday Project, does not feature regular hosts Waleed Aly or Carrie Bickmore, but instead features Peter Helliar with a rotating panel. In 2017, The Sunday Project was hosted by Hamish Macdonald and Chris Bath.

In October 2017, Network 10 announced that they had signed a contract with Lisa Wilkinson, who had left the Nine Network after a contract dispute. Wilkinson joined The Project as a senior host, editor and co-host of The Sunday Project from January 2018. She also appears on the show 2 nights a week.

On 20 February 2017 a New Zealand version of The Project premiered In New Zealand on Channel Three. It follows the same format as the Australian version.

=== Series 11: 2019 ===
On 19 July 2019, The Project celebrated its tenth anniversary with a 90-minute special in its 2700th episode.

=== Series 12: 2020 ===
In January 2020, Peter van Onselen replaced Hamish Macdonald as host of The Sunday Project and became a regular fill-in presenter for Waleed Aly. Macdonald will still feature on the show, amongst his ABC commitments.

From 13 March, two days after the COVID-19 pandemic was declared by the World Health Organization, The Project was filmed without a live studio audience, with restricted guest interviews and only three hosts live in the studio, the fourth host appearing by video link (with exception for Friday and Sunday episodes between mid-June and mid-August, the fourth host was sitting on an extra stool outside the bench), due to social distancing laws in Australia.

=== Series 13: 2021 ===
As of 2020–2021, The Project has been filming without a live studio audience in Sydney and Melbourne.

In June 2021, it was announced that Hamish Macdonald would return to co-hosting The Sunday Project with presenter Lisa Wilkinson from September, while Peter van Onselen returned to his commitments as Network Ten's political editor.

=== Series 14: 2022 ===
In March 2022, Carrie Bickmore announced that she would be taking a sabbatical from the show. Chrissie Swan and Georgie Tunny hosted the show in Bickmore's absence with Swan hosting Monday and Tunny on Tuesday and Wednesday. Bickmore returned in July.

In August 2022, it was announced that Georgie Tunny will be joining the show as a reporter, producer and co-host.

In October 2022, Bickmore announced her departure from the program at the end of the year.

In November 2022, Wilkinson announced her departure from the program effective immediately. Shortly after Wilkinson's resignation, Helliar announced his departure from the show, with his last day being 7 December 2022

=== Series 15: 2023 ===
On 23 November 2022, it was announced that Sarah Harris would replace Bickmore and join the panel in January 2023 to co-host five nights a week, from Sunday to Thursday. Harris would co-host alongside Waleed Aly, who would remain as a presenter from Monday to Thursday, whilst Hamish Macdonald would continue to co-host every Friday and Sunday whilst also reporting on stories from around the country. Reporter and producer Georgie Tunny was announced to be returning to the show in 2023, as a regular co-host on Friday nights.

On 18 December 2022, it was announced that comedians Sam Taunton and Michael Hing were joining the panel as regular co-hosts in 2023, replacing previous presenters Peter Helliar and Tommy Little.

=== Series 16: 2024 ===
The Project returned in 2024 with all hosts returning. Sarah Harris dropped her hosting days from five to four per week, with Georgie Tunny now hosting on Thursday and Fridays.

=== Series 17: 2025 ===
On 17 January 2025, Network 10 confirmed that Michael Hing would not be returning to the show as a host on Friday and Sunday nights. It was subsequently announced that the show would move to a three-host format on Fridays, with Rove McManus, Georgie Tunny and Susie Youssef at the helm. Sam Taunton began hosting five nights a week to replace Hing on Sundays. Myf Warhurst filled in for Youssef at the start of the year.

=== 2025 Cancellation ===
On 9 June 2025, Network 10 confirmed that The Project would be replaced by a new current affairs program, as the network was preparing to phase out its long-running show. The final episode of the series aired on 27 June, with former hosts Carrie Bickmore, Dave Hughes, Charlie Pickering and Pete Helliar making guest appearances.

Following the conclusion of the program, The Project's social media accounts remained active - first with posts joking about the show's cancellation, but eventually continuing with daily news posts.

== Special episodes ==
=== The Election Project ===
A one-hour special covering the 2010 Federal Election, entitled The Election Project, aired on Saturday, 21 August 2010, and marked the first time the show was broadcast on a weekend. Guests included Hugh Riminton and George Negus. The show received 459,000 viewers, ranking 11th for the night. The special returned for the 2013 election and aired for 4 hours and 23 minutes, making it the longest broadcast of The Project ever. Riminton returned with regular panellists Steve Price and Natasha Stott Despoja as well as candidates from the Labor and Liberal parties. This edition received 306,000 viewers over its four and a half-hour broadcast.

While Channel Ten showed an hour's worth of the show in the majority of states, Adelaide was only shown 30 minutes due to football commitments. This may have altered the overall ratings for the show.

This was the first time since the mid-1990s that Ten devoted coverage to a national election; usually the network opted to air alternative programming.

=== The Games Project ===
The Games Project, looked at the 2010 Commonwealth Games.and featured a range of guests including Nicole Livingstone and again ran for an hour, airing before the Opening Ceremony. Only a half hour aired in Adelaide while the show did not air at all in Perth and Brisbane. The show garnered 301,000 viewers.

=== The Wedding Project ===
The Wedding Project, aired on 29 April 2011 as an extension of its regular Friday episode for that night. The show aired for an hour in all metropolitan centres, focussing on that day's royal wedding. It was hosted by Hughes and Pickering with guest panellists Angela Bishop and Tracey Curro joining the men at the desk. Along with Lucy McDonald, Hamish Macdonald and others, Carrie Bickmore was crossed to frequently during the program, reporting on events live from the UK.

Regular guests Hamish Blake and Andy Lee, formerly of Rove Live, appeared to present segments as a visual connection to the activities that they undertake on their weekly radio program, The Hamish and Andy Show. These segments included See No Evil Hear No Evil and Hungry Hungry Heroes.

=== The Project Special: Kony 2012 ===
The Project Special: Kony 2012, aired at 8PM, in addition to its regular 6PM edition, on 8 March 2012. It was hosted by Charlie Pickering, Carrie Bickmore and The Gruen Transfer's Todd Sampson. The Project team discussed the history of accused war criminal Joseph Kony and the campaign to bring him to justice through social media.

=== The Project: 10th Birthday ===
The Project celebrated its tenth anniversary on Friday 19 July 2019 with a 90-minute special in its 2700th episode.

=== The Love Australia Project ===
In May 2020, The Project partnered with Tourism Australia for a special The Love Australia Project which aired on Friday, 15 May 2020. The special celebrated Australia and looked into tourism recovery due to the COVID-19 crisis including problems, solutions, research and interviews with business and government. It was hosted by Lisa Wilkinson and Chris Brown with guest panellists, Tommy Little and Rachel Corbett.

=== The Project Presents 9/11: 20 Years On ===
On 7 September 2021, The Project co-host Carrie Bickmore presented a special commemorating the 20th anniversary of the September 11 attacks. The special aired following the regular edition of the show and virtually reconnected with survivors and their families, whom Bickmore had interviewed on the 10th anniversary, to discover how they were coping another decade on.

== Reception ==
=== Ratings: 2009 ===
The 7PM Project drew 1.285 million viewers for its premiere episode. Ratings dropped across subsequent episodes. Averaged over its opening week, The 7PM Project had 0.938 million viewers per episode. The average viewers for the second week dropped to 0.7392 million viewers per episode.

After dropping in ratings, The 7PM Project stabilised around the 700,000–750,000 mark, occasionally dropping below 690,000.

The series took until late May to reach a national metropolitan audience exceeding one million for the first time in 2010.

On its first broadcast out of the ratings year, The 7PM Project sustained an audience of 826,000, a substantially higher audience than in recent episodes that averaged around 650,000.

=== Ratings: 2010 ===
Ratings were still low at the beginning of the year, however started to build from late March. The show started to regularly achieve an audience above 700,000 by the end of the fifth season of The Biggest Loser which was also building an audience. The end of daylight saving time in some states was also attributed to its rising ratings (the practice has proved to be detrimental to the performance of early evening programs such as The 7PM Project). The program saw an even greater rise in viewers when the network's flagship reality juggernaut MasterChef Australia returned.

On 3 June 2010, The 7PM Project had a viewing audience of just under 1.1 million viewers. It was the first time the show rose above the million (albeit that same week's Monday episode, which also hit the million mark in adjusted figures) since the launch and managed to win in all key demographics and more importantly, in total people.

Its first-year birthday special, airing on 20 July 2010, gained 1,207,000 viewers, winning its timeslot and becoming the highest rated episode of the show since its debut.

=== Ratings: 2011 ===
The 7PM Project returned on 3 January 2011, achieving 680,000 viewers after a generally low rating summer series. A week later, due to the 2010–2011 Queensland floods, rival networks extended their news coverage which pushed current affair shows Today Tonight, which airs on the Seven Network, and A Current Affair, which airs on the Nine Network, from their usual timeslot of 6.30 pm. This meant that the aforementioned shows directly competed with The 7PM Project. The added competition from the higher rating current affairs programs pushed viewership of The Project down to a low of 496,000 on Friday with episodes across the week also down. The 7PM Project came in 36th for the week, averaging out 657,000.

The show averaged just under 1.1 million viewers on 2 May 2011; the first (and only) time the show rose above a million in 2011.

Despite averaging, on the whole, lower ratings than in 2010, the show stabilised to around 750,000–800,000 per night with episodes rarely achieving above 850,000 and below 600,000.

In its first outing at 6.30, The Project scored 571,000; fourth in its slot and the third-highest rating show on TEN for that night.

=== Ratings: 2012 ===
In its first Sunday edition, the show had 392,000 viewers, coming fourth in the timeslot; however it since rated consistently above 400,000. According to Network 10, the move of the show to 6 pm boosted their 6–7 pm hour by 22% in terms of viewers.

On 16 April 2012, The Project began splitting its figures into half-hour intervals. This gave a better indication on how the show does over the 6 pm and 6.30 pm half hours. On this particular broadcast, The Project rated 649,000 from 6.30 to 7.00 pm, and 506,000 from 6.00 to 6.30 pm.

=== Ratings: 2013 ===
The Project struggled since returning to screens in 2013 with episodes rarely achieving ratings above half a million and increasingly finding itself outside the national top 20 programs for the night.

The show saw a rise in viewers during the Easter non-ratings period. On 1 April 2013, the program reached 582,000 viewers. The 1000th episode of the show, airing on 30 April 2013, reached only 493,000 viewers, however the show bounced back to its highest rating of 2013 the following night (Wednesday 1 May) with 610,000 viewers.

By August, ratings had risen to an average of 700,000, hitting the one million mark on occasion, earning the show an overall viewer increase of over 4% when compared to 2012. Demographically, the biggest audience increase came from the 25–54 age group.

=== Ratings: 2014 ===
The Project struggled in the ratings during the beginning of the year, with the first half of the show twice rating under 300,000. Despite the poor ratings during the earlier half of the year, the program's ratings grew as the year went on, including on 6 October 2014, when The Project had an exclusive guest interview, which led the show to rate over 1.1 million viewers, and attract the program's biggest-ever audience in its history.

=== Ratings: 2015 ===
The Project has improved in the ratings during the course of 2015, with the program consistently rating between 600,000 and 700,000 viewers Monday–Thursday. Special guest interviews and stories continue to at times make the program obtain close to one million viewers. Waleed Aly's occasional "Something we should talk about" segments, written with The Project's managing editor, Tom Whitty, gathered a large amount of attention on news sites and social media, particularly through the program's Facebook page, where several videos attracted over one million views.

== Controversy ==
On 24 July 2012, mild controversy was caused when actor Hugh Sheridan appeared on the show promoting his new show, I Will Survive. During the interview, Sheridan called South Australian town Port Augusta "Port A-Gutta", which was seen as a mockery of Aboriginal slang by locals.

In August 2014, senator Eric Abetz received criticism from the media and politicians such as the Greens' Adam Bandt for making claims of a link between abortion and breast cancer when appearing on the show. He had been on The Project to discuss his association with the World Congress of Families.

On 24 June 2015, host Aly clashed with former terror suspect Zaky Mallah in a particularly heated exchange, which resulted in some viewers cheering, and some expressing their disappointment that Mallah had been given a platform at all.

In March 2016, The Project used an edited image of Sudanese-Australian rapper Ror Akot to promote a story on South Sudanese gang violence in Melbourne. There was no evidence to suggest that Akot was in a gang or linked to violence and according to Akot, he believed that his image had been "destroyed".

On 27 May 2017, tennis great and Christian pastor Margaret Court appeared on the program after she wrote a letter saying she was "disappointed Qantas had become an active promoter for same sex marriage". She found it "hard to voice her opinion over the top of hosts Waleed Aly and panellist Meshel Laurie". She said it was "disrespectful" and "disgusting".

During August 2017, The Project's satirical overdub of the same-sex marriage plebiscite television advertisement inflamed viewers on both sides of the debate by overdubbing a woman's response as "Was it a school play of Brokeback Mountain? That's a huge ask to expect anyone to top Heath Ledger's performance."

On 23 December 2019, during the 2019–20 Australian bushfire season, a clip was played showing a RFS volunteer saying, "That's not my Prime Minister" after being introduced to Australian Prime Minister Scott Morrison. The volunteer was hailed as a hero and hashtags such as ‘#NotmyPM’ and ‘#JacquiforPM’ became popular on Twitter. It was later revealed that the clip had only been partially played and showed that the volunteer was actually British rather than Australian. She said she had no problem with Scott Morrison and that she was referring to Boris Johnson. Waleed Aly later apologised for this error saying that the audio was very hard to hear but ultimately took full blame for this incident.

In 2023, the show aired an interview with guest panelist Reuben Kaye, in which he made a sexually explicit joke about the Crucifixion of Jesus. In the following episode, hosts Waleed Aly and Sarah Harris issued an on air apology, calling the joke "deeply and needlessly offensive to...Muslim and...Christian viewers." Kaye would later go on to appear on the ABC's Q+A, where he was asked if the joke would have stirred up as much controversy if told by a straight comedian. Kaye responded by saying he absolutely believed that to be the case, criticising the media for stifling queer voices; "It's not about the joke, it's about who was telling it."

== Criticism ==
Retired AFL player Heritier Lumumba has alleged that The Project discredited his accounts of being a victim of racism during his time as a player. Lumumba also accused the program of victim blaming on his personal website. In 2021, the Do Better report was leaked to the Australian media. The report found the Collingwood Football Club guilty of systemic racism. This led to calls for The Project, and hosts Waleed Aly and Peter Helliar, to apologise on-air. Helliar wrote an apology saying that "This report is heartbreaking. To @iamlumumba I am truly, unequivocally sorry. I should have believed you. I will do better." A few days later, the interview was no longer accessible on the program's Facebook account. A former executive producer at Channel 10 stated, "What The Project should do right now is show a bit of that clip, have Waleed and Pete sit there and talk about it and the lessons they've learned and what they'll do going forward."

In November 2017, Milo Yiannopoulos criticised the program after it cancelled an alleged scheduled interview with him while he was in Australia for his Troll Academy tour. He called Waleed Aly "an intellectual lightweight", "total coward" and "insubstantial". A spokesperson for Channel 10 said, "The Project and Studio 10 did not cancel interviews with Milo Yiannopoulos. We never scheduled interviews with him."

In June 2018, actor Richard Dreyfuss criticised the show about how he was interviewed. In the interview, Dreyfuss was asked by panellist Lisa Wilkinson about his experience of the Me Too movement and an allegation of inappropriate sexual behaviour recently made against him. Dreyfuss later appeared on the rival Nine Network show Today Extra for several minutes reading a statement saying, "I was mugged the other night in Sydney, Australia. Not by a petty thief but by the host and hostesses of a talk show called The Project." He said that he and another guest, Kathleen Turner, were promised a "light and friendly chat" but soon changed to questions about the current state of Hollywood. A statement from Network 10 to news.com.au stated that Dreyfuss had not been misled and that an interview brief had been provided three days prior. Wilkinson released a statement saying that Dreyfuss had not been "ambushed" or "mugged" and warned that she had the email chain to prove it, further stating "As a journalist I make no apology for courteously asking an entirely legitimate question about a subject you had spoken of before and which has generated more headlines than anything you've done in the last 20 years."

In November 2022, the program faced criticism for airing an interview in which celebrity chef George Calombaris claimed he was the victim of cancel culture after his company was found underpaying his workers $7.8 million in wages. The interview with Hamish Macdonald was to promote Calombaris' television comeback, the cooking show Hungry.

== Awards and nominations ==
Bickmore won a Logie Award in the category of Most Popular New Female Talent for her work on the show. Pickering was nominated for a Logie Award in the category of Most Popular New Male Talent for his work on the show.

=== Logie Awards ===
Year	Nominee	Category	Result
2010	Carrie Bickmore	Most Popular New Female Talent	Won
2010	Charlie Pickering	Most Popular New Male Talent	Nominated
2012	Carrie Bickmore	Gold Logie for Most Popular Personality on Australian Television	Nominated
2012	Carrie Bickmore	Most Popular Presenter	Nominated
2012	The Project	Most Popular Light Entertainment Program	Nominated
2012	The Project	Most Outstanding Light Entertainment Program	Nominated
2013	Carrie Bickmore	Gold Logie	Nominated
2013	Carrie Bickmore	Most Popular Presenter	Nominated
2013	The Project	Most Popular Light Entertainment Program	Nominated
2014	Carrie Bickmore	Gold Logie	Nominated
2014	Carrie Bickmore	Most Popular Presenter	Nominated
2014	The Project	Most Popular Light Entertainment Program	Nominated
2015	Carrie Bickmore	Gold Logie	Won
2015	Carrie Bickmore	Most Popular Presenter	Won
2015	The Project	Most Popular Entertainment Program	Nominated
2016	Waleed Aly	Gold Logie	Won
2016	Carrie Bickmore	Gold Logie	Nominated
2016	Waleed Aly	Most Popular Presenter	Won
2016	Carrie Bickmore	Most Popular Presenter	Nominated
2016	The Project	Best News Panel	Won
2017	Peter Helliar	Gold Logie	Nominated
2017	Waleed Aly	Gold Logie	Nominated
2017	Waleed Aly	Best Presenter	Won
2017	Carrie Bickmore	Best Presenter	Nominated
2017	The Project	Best News Panel or Current Affairs Program	Won
2018	Carrie Bickmore	Most Popular Presenter	Nominated
2018	The Project	Most Popular Entertainment Program	Nominated
2019	Waleed Aly	Gold Logie	Nominated
2019	Carrie Bickmore	Most Popular Presenter	Nominated
2019	Waleed Aly	Most Popular Presenter	Nominated
2019	The Project	Most Popular Panel or Current Affairs Program	Won
2022	The Project	Most Popular Panel or Current Affairs Program	Won
2022	The Project	Most Outstanding News Coverage or Public Affairs Report	Won

=== Walkley Awards ===
Year	Nominee	Category	Result
2012	Hamish Macdonald	Television Current Affairs Reporting for his report, "Age of Uncertainty"	Won

=== National Disability Awards ===
Year	Nominee	Category	Result
2012	The Project	Yooralla Media Award of Distinction	Won

== See also ==
- The Project (New Zealand TV programme)
- The Sunday Night Project
