= Sarah Harris (journalist) =

Australian presenter and journalist (born 1981)

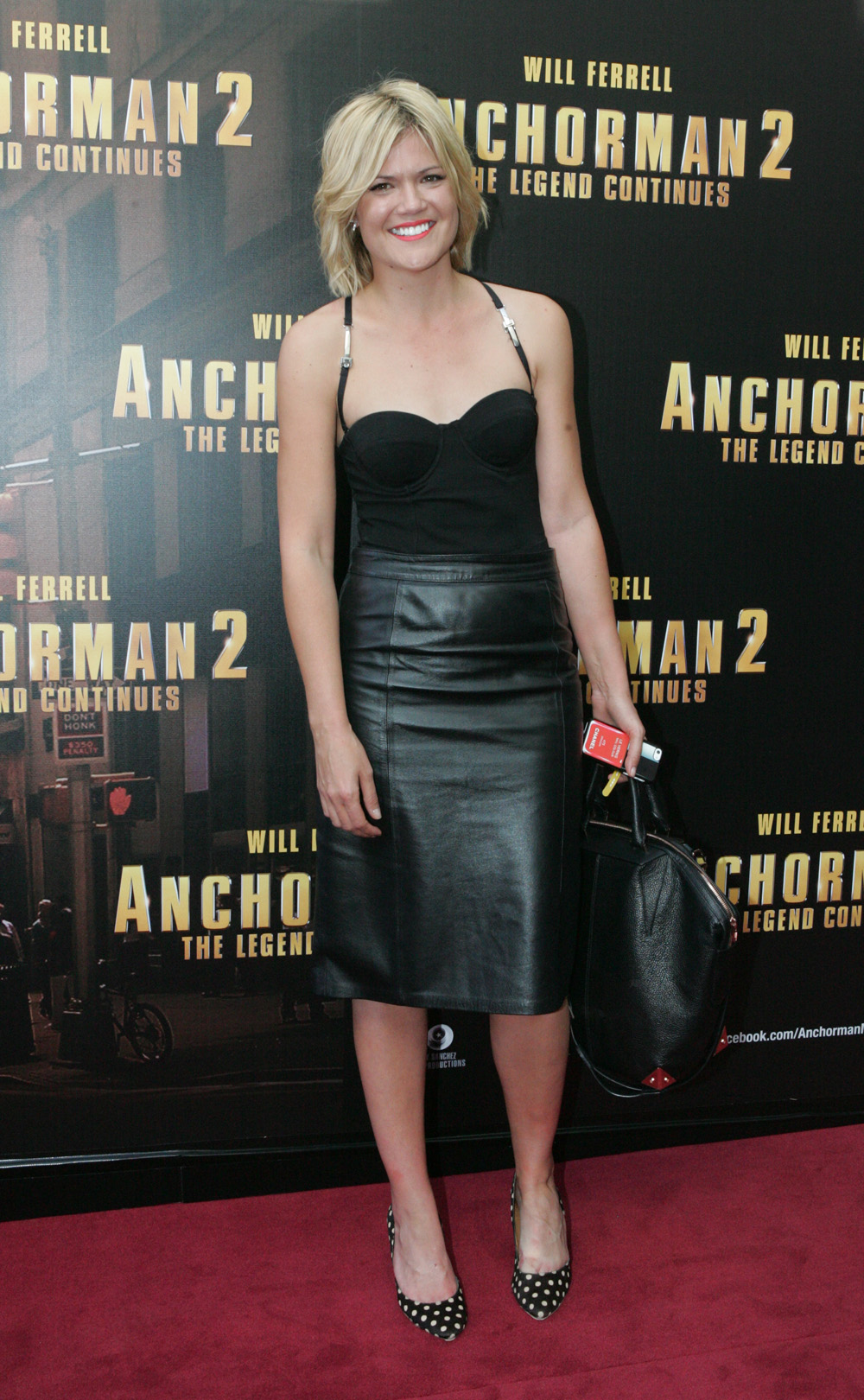
- Harris at the Anchorman 2 premiere in 2013
- Born: 13 July 1981 (age 45)
- Occupations: Television presenter; journalist
- Years active: 1997−present
- Known for: The Project
- Spouse: Tom Ward (m. 2014; div. 2021)
- Children: 2

Sarah Harris (born 13 July 1981) is an Australian television presenter and journalist. She is currently newsreader on Nova 96.9's Ricki‑Lee & Tim.

Harris previously co‑hosted Network 10's The Project and was a long‑time co‑host of the morning talk show Studio 10.

== Early life ==
Harris grew up in a block of housing commission flats in Mount Druitt, a western suburb of Sydney. She has one younger brother. Her father died of prostate cancer at 50. She is of Croatian descent through her grandparents, who emigrated to Australia.

== Career ==
Harris studied journalism and international business at Queensland University of Technology. Her journalism career started in 1997 at the Seven Network in Brisbane, where she filed reports for Seven News and later Today Tonight.

In June 2001, she joined Prime Gold Coast News where she was a freelance television reporter and presenter. She then moved back to the Seven Network in Brisbane where she was a cadet news reporter and writer.

In 2002, Harris joined the Nine Network and became a reporter, researcher, and fill-in presenter on Extra. She also joined National Nine News as a reporter and Today. She delivered live reports from the scene of the Cairns Tilt Train derailment in November 2004, as well as Sir Joh Bjelke-Petersen’s funeral in Kingaroy in 2005. She left Today in 2005 to become a reporter and fill-in presenter on National Nine News in Brisbane.

In 2007, Harris moved to Sydney to become a Today reporter and a fill-in news presenter. She was also a fill-in news presenter on Nine Morning News, Nine Afternoon News, Nine News Sydney and Weekend Today.

In 2012, Harris was the main fill-in presenter for Sonia Kruger on Mornings. She also filled in for Leila McKinnon on Weekend Today whilst she was on maternity leave.

In August 2013, she resigned from the Nine Network to join Network Ten's then new morning program, Studio 10 as a co-host with Ita Buttrose, Joe Hildebrand and Jessica Rowe. She was also a fill-in host on Network Ten program The Project.

In November 2014, Harris was announced as the host of Shark Tank.

In February 2016, Harris was welcomed to the No Agenda round table as a Black Dame by Adam Curry and John C Dvorak.

On 23 November 2022, Sarah announced that she would be leaving Studio 10 after hosting the show for nine years to become a new co-host of The Project in 2023 after the departure of the show's longest running co-host Carrie Bickmore in December 2022. In June 2025, The Project was cancelled by 10, with Harris subsequently leaving the network.

In February 2026, Harris was appointed newsreader for Ricki‑Lee & Tim on Nova 96.9.

== Personal life ==
Harris married information technology specialist Tom Ward in Sydney in 2014. Harris and Ward have two children. In March 2021, Harris announced that she and Ward are "taking time apart; however, we remain good friends and deeply committed to co-parenting our two beautiful boys".

Harris prefers 90s fashion, especially Lululemon tights. Her favorite designers are Scanlan Theodore, Witchery, Cue, Carla Zampatti and Bianca Spender.

Media offices
| Preceded by Carrie Bickmore; Lisa Wilkinson | The Project; Co-host; January 2023 – June 2025 | Succeeded by Program axed |
| Preceded by Originator | Studio 10; Co-host; November 2013 – December 2022 | Succeeded by Angela Bishop; Narelda Jacobs |
