= Narelda Jacobs =

Australian television journalist

Narelda Jacobs OAM
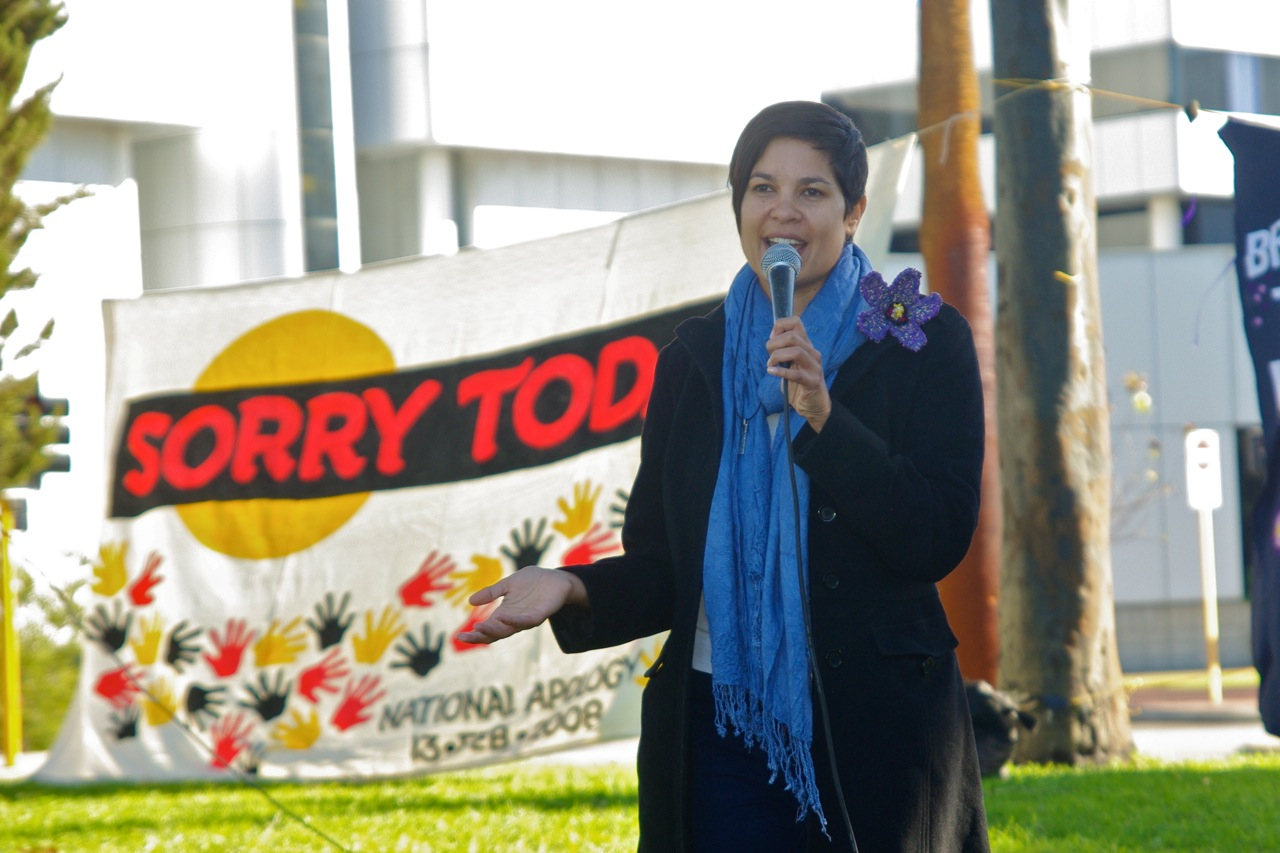
- Jacobs at National Sorry Day 2013
- Born: Perth, Western Australia
- Occupations: Television journalist, TV weather presenter
- Years active: 2000–present
- Employer: Network 10
- Known for: 10 News
- Spouse: Karina Natt (married 2024–present)
- Children: 2

Narelda Jacobs is an Australian journalist, newsreader, and television presenter. Her career with Network 10 began in Perth, Western Australia, in 2000. In January 2020, she moved to Sydney to co-host Studio 10, and also to present 10 News Perth. As of 2024, Jacobs presented the national news bulletin 10 News: Lunchtime, as well as 10 News: Afternoons and in April 2026 returned to Perth to present the 10 News Weekends. She also works with NITV, as a co-host of the weekly program The Point, as well as appearing on various ABC Television. She has also had roles in drama series.

== Early life and education ==
Narelda Jacobs, of Whadjuk Noongar heritage, was raised in Perth. Her father, Cedric Jacobs, was a Uniting Church minister and Indigenous rights campaigner, who was a member of the Stolen Generations. Her father was the founder of the conservative One Australia Movement and stood for parliament on several occasions. Her White mother, Margaret, was also involved in the ministry.

Jacobs has said that she was raised in a fundamentalist Christian household, and attended born-again churches until her late teens. The family had a large shed which would accommodate visiting missionaries. Jacobs, aged around 12, was "told we have to save souls, we have to save people. And so I would be paired with some of them.... to save souls by knocking on doors". She was frightened of going to hell, and even more so of allowing others to go to hell.

Jacobs was the youngest of five daughters. Her mother was born in Belfast and of Irish and English descent, while her father was a Whadjuk Noongar man and a member of the Stolen Generation. He was active in Aboriginal politics, and journalists would often be at their house or talking with him on the phone. He was part of the National Aboriginal Conference delegation to the United Nations in Geneva in 1981.

Jacobs and her parents were always interested in what was making the news. Jacobs says she decided in Year 7 that she wanted to pursue a career in journalism. She attended Hampton Senior High School in Morley, Western Australia.

After finishing high school, Jacobs applied to the Western Australian Academy of Performing Arts (WAAPA), but was not accepted. She got her first job working at the front desk of the National Native Title Tribunal (NNTT) and soon moved to their media department. Shortly afterwards, at 18, Jacobs became pregnant to her boyfriend of two years. She got married due to "family pressure and her religious upbringing" but six months after the birth of her daughter, the marriage ended.

With the support of her family, Jacobs returned to work at the NNTT. After working for the NNTT for five years, Jacobs reapplied for WAAPA at the encouragement of her boss. She was successful and began a degree in broadcast journalism at WAAPA.

== Career ==
After graduation, Jacobs began her career at GWN in Bunbury. She joined Ten News in Perth in 2000, eventually becoming their court reporter, and also filling in as weather presenter over summer. In 2008, Network Ten announced that production of their Perth news bulletin would return to Perth from Sydney, and selected Jacobs as the new presenter.

Jacobs is an Aboriginal and lesbian newsreader based in Western Australia. She advertised her case for answering "Yes" to the question in the 2017 Australian Marriage Law Postal Survey.

In March 2019, Jacobs co-hosted SBS's broadcast of the Sydney Gay and Lesbian Mardi Gras. She co-hosted again in 2020 and 2021.

On 13 January 2020, Jacobs relocated to Sydney, after 20 years at 10 News First Perth, to join the Studio 10 morning talk show as a panellist. However, later in 2020, Jacobs returned to read the Perth edition of 10 News First while juggling continued work on Studio 10, following the network-wide cost cutting that saw the bulletin move back to Sydney.

In 2020 and 2021, Jacobs co-hosted the Sunrise Ceremony on 26 January (Australia Day) with John Paul Janke. The event was simulcast on NITV, SBS, and Channel 10.

In late 2022, it was announced that Jacobs was set to host an all new news bulletin, 10 News First: Midday. She began hosting duties on Monday 9 January 2023. The program followed Jacobs' other hosting position, Studio 10, and aired from 12:00pm to 1:00pm.

In 2023, she presented an episode of Compass, called "Come Together".

In February 2024, Jacobs appeared with Pasifika New Zealander drag artist Kween Kong on Fran Kelly's podcast Yours Queerly. She said that she had long been an admirer of the star of RuPaul's Drag Race Down Under.

Jacobs has also appeared on The Project, Insiders, Q+A, and The Drum. She also works as a moderator and speaker. She appeared in the TV documentary The Dark Emu Story, and has also had roles in Australian drama series, including Safe Home and Total Control. She co-hosted the podcast 456 Club.

== Honours ==
In the 2023 King's Birthday Honours, Jacobs was awarded the Medal of the Order of Australia for "service to the media, and to the community".

== Other roles ==
In November 2021 Jacobs was appointed to the inaugural National Indigenous Advisory Group of Football Australia. The group aims at supporting and increasing Aboriginal and Torres Strait Islander participation in soccer. She was a Legacy '23 Ambassador for the 2023 FIFA Women's World Cup.

Jacobs is an ambassador of the Pinnacle Foundation, Australian Literacy and Numeracy Foundation, Motor Neurone Disease Association WA, WA Aboriginal Leadership Institute, and Deadly Science, and was a Rainbow Champion for World Pride Sydney in 2023.

== Personal life ==
Jacobs came out as a lesbian to her mother at 21. Her mother was not accepting of her sexuality; Jacobs never told her father.

Jacobs lives in Sydney with her wife Karina Natt. They married in August 2024. Jacobs' daughter, Jade Dolman, is an artist who works under the name JD Penangke.
