= Joe Hildebrand =

Australian journalist

- Born: 23 June 1976 (age 50); Melbourne, Victoria, Australia
- Education: Dandenong High School; Melbourne University
- Occupations: journalist; television presenter; radio presenter
- Employer: News Corp.
- Known for: The Daily Telegraph; Herald Sun news.com.au
- Spouse: Tara Ravens (m. 2013)
- Children: 3

Joe Hildebrand (born 23 June 1976) is an Australian journalist, television and radio presenter.

Hildebrand writes for Sydney's The Daily Telegraph and is also known to contribute to a number of other News Corp publications, including Melbourne's Herald Sun and news.com.au.

== Early life and education ==
Hildebrand was born in Melbourne and grew up in Dandenong in outer Melbourne. He attended Dandenong Primary School, Dandenong High School and the University of Melbourne, graduating with a Bachelor of Arts degree majoring in history and English. He edited the student newspaper, Farrago. Before joining The Daily Telegraph, Hildebrand worked as the New South Wales political correspondent for Australian Associated Press and also worked in London for the Press Association.

== Career ==
Hildebrand was co-awarded the 2004 Human Rights print media award and a high commendation in the 2004 Walkley Awards for the report Stolen Wages Payback Shame.

Hildebrand appeared on the ABC's national talk program, Q&A, on 30 May 2011, 12 September 2011 and 10 August 2015. He has also made several appearances on the ABC's national current affairs program, The Drum, since December 2010. He has had a weekly spot on Channel Seven's The Morning Show as well as Sky News Australia talk program Paul Murray Live.

Hildebrand was the host of the television series Dumb, Drunk and Racist, which debuted on ABC2 on 20 June 2012. Dumb, Drunk and Racist followed Hildebrand and four Indian travellers around Australia to test whether the popular Indian perception of Australians as stupid and intoxicated bigots was correct. Early figures for the first episode had average audience numbers in the five capital cities alone at 266,000 with a peak of just under 320,000. He went on to host Shitsville Express which aired on 2 July 2013 on ABC2.

In November 2013, Hildebrand joined Network Ten's new morning show, Studio 10, as a panellist alongside Sarah Harris. He remained in this position until his resignation from the network in September 2020.

Hildebrand was the co-host of a national drive time radio program with Matt Tilley on Triple M from January to December 2014.

After his departure from Studio 10 in September 2020, Hildebrand joined Sydney's 2GB where he joined the John Stanley program with "The Daily Telegraph" segment.

== Personal life ==
Hildebrand is married to journalist Tara Ravens. They have three children and live in Sydney.

When Hildebrand was ten years old, his younger brother Paddy went missing on a family bushwalk at Wilson's Promontory. Paddy, who was autistic, was not found despite an extensive search and rescue operation and to this day what became of him remains a mystery.

== Controversies ==
Throughout 2014, starting on 2 April, Hildebrand was embroiled in a number of controversies. First, he and Network 10 apologised for remarks Hildebrand had made during a panel discussion when he insinuated that Rosie Batty, whose 11-year-old son was murdered by his father Greg Anderson, was responsible for her son's death, stating that "To say that you're going to not report a case of child sex abuse by your partner because you are scared for your own safety, I'm sorry, it is not an excuse."

Later that year, on 18 June, Hildebrand and his co-host Matt Tilley apologised after a number of racist comments were made during their Triple M show The One Percenters. The comments caused outrage in Colombia, leading the Colombian embassy in Australia to call on the radio DJs to be punished under the Australian Racial Discrimination Act 1975. They included comments suggesting that all Colombians are drug addicts. They stated, "Are you suggesting that there is another stimulant beginning with C that Colombia is more famous for than caffeine?" and "If you mention Colombia, the next thing that people generally mention is cocaine", before adding that "Colombian people who go, well, you know what? We are a bit more than that. We have gangs and we kill people too, you know, and coffee." They then went on to state that "Sometimes, after you’ve done a big night on the blow, you need a cup of coffee to straighten yourself out. We are saying that Colombians love it."

Shortly after, on 14 July, Hildebrand was criticised on social media following homophobic comments he made on Twitter after Australian swimmer Ian Thorpe came out as homosexual.
