= List of Australian television newsreaders and news presenters =

== Current presenters ==
=== National ===
- Jayne Azzopardi, Today News presenter
- Ros Childs, ABC News at Noon presenter
- Edwina Bartholomew, Sunrise News presenter
- Lizzie Pearl, Weekend Today News presenter
- Deborah Knight, Nine Morning News presenter
- Georgie Tunny, 10 News Weekend presenter
- Sally Bowrey, Weekend Sunrise News presenter
- Janice Petersen, SBS World News, presenter
- Catalina Flórez, SBS World News, presenter
- Ricardo Gonçalves, SBS World News Late presenter

=== Metropolitan ===
==== Sydney ====
Bulletin	Role	Edition						
Bulletin	Role	Monday	Tuesday	Wednesday	Thursday	Friday	Saturday	Sunday
Seven News	News	Mark Ferguson (since January 2014); Angela Cox (since September 2024)			Michael Usher (since April 2026); Angie Asimus (since April 2026)			Mark Ferguson (since January 2014); Angela Cox (since September 2024)
Seven News	Sport	Mel McLaughlin (since April 2016)				Matt White (since January 2026)		Mel McLaughlin (since April 2016)
Seven News	Weather	Angelique Opie (since October 2026)	Angie Asimus (since April 2026)		Angelique Opie (since October 2026)			
Nine News	News	Peter Overton (since January 2009)				Mark Burrows (since June 2026)		Peter Overton (since January 2009)
Nine News	Sport	James Bracey (since March 2022)				Zac Bailey (since June 2025)		James Bracey (since March 2022)
Nine News	Weather	Sophie Walsh (since November 2025)				Belinda Russell (since 2013)		Sophie Walsh (since November 2025)
10 News	News	Sandra Sully (since September 2011)					—N/a	
10 News	Sport	Tara Rushton (since January 2025)					—N/a	
10 News	Weather	Josh Holt (since September 2020)					—N/a	
ABC News	News	Jeremy Fernandez (since September 2023)				Lydia Feng (since September 2023)		Jeremy Fernandez (since September 2023)
ABC News	Sport	—N/a				Niav Owens (since September 2026)		
ABC News	Weather	Tom Saunders (since August 2022)					—N/a	

==== Melbourne ====
Bulletin	Role	Edition						
Bulletin	Role	Monday	Tuesday	Wednesday	Thursday	Friday	Saturday	Sunday
Seven News	News	Peter Mitchell (since November 2000)				Karina Carvalho (since January 2025)		
Seven News	Sport	Rebecca Maddern (since January 2025)					Theo Doropoulos (since February 2025)	
Seven News	Weather	Jane Bunn (since December 2014)					Tyra Stowers (since February 2025)	
Nine News	News	Alicia Loxley (since January 2024)					Peter Hitchener (since December 2023)	
Nine News	Sport	Tony Jones (since 1990)					Natalie Yoannidis (since 2024)	
Nine News	Weather	Scherri-Lee Biggs (since January 2026)					Madeline Spark (since 2020)	
10 News	News	Jennifer Keyte (since June 2018)					—N/a	
10 News	Sport	Stephen Quartermain (since July 2018)					—N/a	
10 News	Weather	Jayde Cotic (since January 2023)					—N/a	
ABC News	News	Tamara Oudyn (since October 2018)					Iskhandar Razak (since October 2023)	
ABC News	Sport	—N/a				Alexia Pesce (since September 2025)		
ABC News	Weather	Adam Morgan (since November 2024)				—N/a		

==== Brisbane ====
Bulletin	Role	Edition						
Bulletin	Role	Monday	Tuesday	Wednesday	Thursday	Friday	Saturday	Sunday
Seven News	News	Max Futcher (since March 2018); Sarah Greenhalgh (since October 2024)					Samantha Heathwood (since February 2024)	
Seven News	Sport	Steve Titmus (since 2024)				Alissa Smith		Steve Titmus (since 2024)
Seven News	Weather	Tony Auden (since December 2013)				Michelle Jensen		Tony Auden (since December 2013)
Nine News	News	Melissa Downes (since January 2009); Joel Dry (since August 2025)					Mia Glover (since 2023)	
Nine News	Sport	Bronte Gildea (since 2026)					Dominique Loudon	
Nine News	Weather	Garry Youngberry					Luke Bradnam	
10 News	News	Sharyn Ghidella (since September 2024)					—N/a	
10 News	Sport	Veronica Eggleton (since September 2024)					—N/a	
10 News	Weather	Liz Cantor (since September 2024)					—N/a	
ABC News	News	Jessica van Vonderen (since March 2023)				Lexy Hamilton-Smith (since February 2025)		Jessica van Vonderen (since March 2023)
ABC News	Sport	—N/a				Mackenzie Colahan (since November 2025)		
ABC News	Weather	Jenny Woodward				Jacqui McLaren	—N/a	Jenny Woodward

==== Adelaide ====
Bulletin	Role	Edition						
Bulletin	Role	Monday	Tuesday	Wednesday	Thursday	Friday	Saturday	Sunday
Seven News	News	Rosanna Mangiarelli (since January 2023); Will Goodings (since January 2023)					Mike Smithson (since January 2023)	
Seven News	Sport	Bruce Abernethy					Mark Soderstrom	
Seven News	Weather	Casey Treloar					Gertie Spurling	
Nine News	News	Brenton Ragless (since 2014)					Will McDonald (since 2011)	
Nine News	Sport	Tom Rehn (since 2022)					Corey Norris (since 2022)	
Nine News	Weather	Jessica Braithwaite (since 2016)					Chelsea Carey (since 2019)	
10 News	News	Kate Freebairn (since February 2023)					—N/a	
10 News	Sport	Max Burford (since February 2023)					—N/a	
10 News	Weather	Tiffany Warne (since February 2023)					—N/a	
ABC News	News	Jessica Harmsen since July 2010)				Bethanie Alderson (since March 2026)		
ABC News	Sport	—N/a				Aaron Bryans (since March 2026)		

==== Perth ====
Bulletin	Role	Edition						
Bulletin	Role	Monday	Tuesday	Wednesday	Thursday	Friday	Saturday	Sunday
Seven News	News	Angela Tsun (since January 2026); Tim McMillan (since January 2026)			Rick Ardon (since January 2026); Susannah Carr (since January 2026)			Angela Tsun (since January 2026); Tim McMillan (since January 2026)
Seven News	Sport	Ryan Daniels (since February 2022)					Adrian Barich (since October 2007)	
Seven News	Weather	Samantha Jolly (since February 2016)					Jerrie Demasi (since October 2026)	
Nine News	News	Michael Thomson (since January 2018)					Tracy Vo (since April 2020)	
Nine News	Sport	Paddy Sweeney (since November 2025)				TBD (since November 2025)		
Nine News	Weather	Natalia Cooper (since January 2026)				Elizabeth Creasy (since April 2020)		Natalia Cooper
10 News	News	Natalie Forrest (since 2023)					Narelda Jacobs (since 2026)	
10 News	Sport	Lachy Reid (since September 2020)					—N/a	
10 News	Weather	Lee Steele (since February 2022) or Beau Pearson (since February 2022)					—N/a	
ABC News	News	Pamela Medlen (since September 2020)				Charlotte Hamlyn (since June 2022)		
ABC News	Sport	—N/a				Tom Wildie		
ABC News	Weather	Tabarak Al Jrood					—N/a	

=== Regional ===
	Presenter	Sport presenter	Weather
Seven News Regional NSW	Madelaine Collignon (Weeknights); Nick Hose (Weeknights); Daniel Gibson (Weeknights 6:30pm)		Kirstie Fitzpatrick (Weeknights)
Seven News Regional QLD	Joanne Desmond (Weeknights)	Nathan Spurling (Weeknights)	Livino Regano (Weeknights)
Seven News Regional WA	Noel Brunning (Weeknights)		
Seven News Tasmania	Kim Millar (Monday to Wednesday) since April 2020; Michael Maney (Thursday to Sunday) since July 2025	Andy “Tubes” Taylor (Weeknights) since May 2026	Kiah Wicks (Weeknights); Rick Marton (Weekends/Fills)
Nine News Gold Coast	Paul Taylor (Weeknights); Eva Millic (Weeknights)	Dominique Loudon	Garry Youngberry (Monday); Luke Bradnam (Tuesday to Friday)
NBN News	Natasha Beyersdorf (Weeknights)	Adam Murray (Monday to Tuesday) Montanna Claire (Wednesday to Friday)	Lauren Kempe (Weeknights)
WIN News Tasmania	Bruce Roberts (Weeknights) since August 2018	Amy Duggan (Weeknights)	Adam Straney (Weeknights)
ABC News Tasmania	Guy Stayner (Weeknights) since August 2018; Sabra Lane (Weekends) since March 2026		
ABC News Canberra	Greg Jennett (Sunday to Thursday); Adrienne Francis (Friday to Saturday)		
ABC News Northern Territory	Kyle Dowling (Sunday to Thursday); Paul Murphy (Friday to Saturday)		

== Breakfast TV ==
Weekdays

	Co-host	News presenter	Sport presenter	Entertainment presenter	Weather presenter	Place overall	Production location	Network
Sunrise	Matt Shirvington; Natalie Barr	Edwina Bartholomew	Matt Shirvington	Edwina Bartholomew	Sam Mac	First (Metro ratings)	Eveleigh, Sydney	Seven Network (1991–1999, 2000–present)
Today	Sylvia Jeffreys; Tom Steinfort	Jayne Azzopardi	Michael Atkinson	Richard Wilkins; Renee Bargh	Dan Anstey	Second (Metro ratings)	North Sydney, Sydney	Nine Network
News Breakfast	James Glenday; Bridget Brennan	Emma Rebellato	Catherine Murphy		Nate Byrne	Third (Metro ratings)	Southbank, Melbourne	ABC (2011–present) & ABC News (2010–present); ABC2 (2008–2011)

Weekends

	Co-host	News presenter	Sport presenter	Weather presenter	Place overall	Production location	Network
Weekend Sunrise	David Woiwod; Monique Wright	Sally Bowrey		James Tobin	First	Eveleigh, Sydney	Seven Network
Weekend Today	Dan Anstey; Alison Piotrowski	Lizzie Pearl			Second	North Sydney, Sydney	Nine Network
Weekend Breakfast	Johanna Nicholson; Fauziah Ibrahim		Jared Coote or Daniela Intili		Third	Ultimo, Sydney	ABC

== Morning TV ==
Weekdays

	Co-host	News presenter	Place overall	Production location	Network
The Morning Show	Larry Emdur; Kylie Gillies	Liam Tapper (Monday to Thursday); Sally Bowrey (Friday)	First	Eveleigh, Sydney	Seven Network
Today Extra	David Campbell; Belinda Russell	Deborah Knight (Monday to Thursday); Kate Creedon (Friday)	Second	North Sydney, Sydney	Nine Network

== Current public and current affairs ==
A Current Affair	Host	Host (Saturday)
A Current Affair	Allison Langdon	Deborah Knight

7.30	Host
7.30	Sarah Ferguson

Four Corners	Reporters	Special Contributors
Four Corners	Angus Grigg; Adam Harvey; Stephanie March; Louise Milligan; Sean Nicholls; Grace Tobin; Morag Ramsay	Anne Connolly; Avani Dias; Adele Ferguson; Mark Willacy; Elise Worthington

60 Minutes	Correspondents	Special Contributors
60 Minutes	Tara Brown; Amelia Adams; Adam Hegarty; Dimity Clancey	Peter Overton; Karl Stefanovic; Allison Langdon; Sarah Abo; Nick McKenzie

== Longest-serving broadcasters ==
- Peter Hitchener, ABQ-2 (1970–1972), ABN-2 (1973–1974), GTV-9 (1974–present) – 52 Years
- Susannah Carr, ABW-2 (1974–1985), TVW-7 (1985–present) – 48 Years
- Kevin Crease, NWS-9 (1959–1976) and (1987–2007), ADS-7 (1977–1987) – 48 Years
- Bruce Paige, ABQ-2 (1975–1985), QTQ-9, (1985–1990, 1993–2009, 2010–present), TVQ-10 (1990), TNQ-7/FNQ-10 (1991–1993) – 47 Years
- Brian Henderson, TCN-9/GTV-9 (1956–2002) – 46 Years
- Rick Ardon, TVW-7 (1978–present) – 44 Years
- Mal Walden, HSV-7 (1969–1987), ATV-10 (1987–2013) – 44 Years [Following Brian Henderson's retirement, until December 2013, Walden was the 'longest continually serving presenter on Australian television' and according to himself, had presented 12,000 bulletins].
- Ian Ross, TCN-9 (1965–2001), ATN-7 (2003–2009) – 42 Years
- Peter “Murph” Murphy, TNT-9 (1984–2025) — 41 Years
- Graeme Goodings, TNT-9 (1974–1981), SAS-10 (post 1987, SAS-7) (1981–2014) – 40 Years
- David Johnston, HSV-7 (1963–1978) and (1996–2005), ATV-10 (1980–1996) – 40 Years
- Ann Sanders, TEN-10 (1985–1986), ATN-7 (1987–present) – 37 Years
- Jo Hall, GTV-9 (1979–2011, 2017–2021) – 36 Years
- Kay McGrath, TVQ-10 (1984–1987), ATN-7 (1988–1989), BTQ-7 (1989–2020) – 36 Years
- John Riddell, NWS-9 (1983–1989), SAS-7 (1990–2019) – 36 Years
- Sharyn Ghidella, TNQ (1987–1988), TVQ-10 (1989–1990, 2024–present), TCN-9 (1991–2006), BTQ-7 (2007–2024) – 35 Years
- Jane Doyle, ABS-2 (1988), SAS-7 (1989–2022) – 34 Years
- Rob Kelvin, NWS-9 (1979–2010, 2014–2017) – 34 Years
- Rod Young, ABQ-2 (1985–2002), BTQ-7 (2002–2019) – 34 Years
- Ross Symonds, ABV-2 (1970–1982), ATN-7 (1982–2003) – 33 Years
- Bill McDonald, BTQ-7 (1987–1996, 2013–2018), TVQ-10 (1997–2012) – 31 Years
- Ron Wilson, TEN-10 (1981–2012) – 31 Years
- Jim Waley, TCN-9 (1975–2004), Sky News Australia (2009) – 30 Years
- Tom Payne, TVT-6 (1970–2000) – 30 Years
- Brian Naylor, HSV-7 (1970–1978), GTV-9 (1978–1998) – 28 Years
- James Dibble, ABN-2 (1956–1983) – 27 Years
- Juanita Phillips, TVQ-10 (1990–1993), TEN-10 (1994–1996), Sky News Australia (1997), BBC (1998–2000), CNN (2001–2003), ABN-2 (2003–2023) – 27 Years
- Ian Henderson, ABV-2 (1992–2018) – 26 Years
- Geoff Raymond, HSV-7 (1956–1969), ATV-0 (1970–1972), ABV-2 (1973–1984) – 26 Years
- Roger Climpson, TCN-9 (1963–1972), ATN-7 (1972–1982) and (1989–1995) – 24 Years
- Anne Fulwood, ADS-7 (1982–1986), TEN-10 (1986–1995), ATN-7 (1995–1999, 2001–2003), HSV-7 (1999–2000) – 19 Years
- Jo Palmer, TNT-9 (2002–2018) – 18 Years
- Sir Eric Pearce, HSV-7 (1956–1957), GTV-9 (1958–1972, 1976–1978) – 17 Years
- Katrina Lee, TEN-10 (1978–1987) and (1991–1994) – 13 Years

Veteran = Critical in the development of their particular news service or long standing role as news presenter at a particular or numerous stations.

== Weekly news averages 2010 ==
NFA = no figures available

Market	Week 1 Weeknight News Averages
Market	ABC News	Seven News	Nine News	Ten News	SBS World News
5 Cities	930,000	1,310,000	1,134,000	823,000	NFA
Sydney	240,000	316,000	316,000	196,000
Melbourne	313,000	380,000	391,000	273,000
Brisbane	153,000	265,000	212,000	142,000
Adelaide	92,000	173,000	106,000	99,000
Perth	133,000	176,000	111,000	114,000

Market	Week 2 Weeknight News Averages
Market	ABC News	Seven News	Nine News	Ten News	SBS World News
5 Cities	902,000	1,263,000	1,148,000	799,000	NFA
Sydney	292,000	295,000	320,000	187,000
Melbourne	292,000	360,000	368,000	240,000
Brisbane	155,000	264,000	245,000	165,000
Adelaide	88,000	155,000	110,000	88,000
Perth	125,000	155,000	110,000	118,000

== 1970–1979 ==
1970

	Sydney	Melbourne	Brisbane	Adelaide	Perth
National Nine News	Brian Henderson	Eric Pearce	Don Seccombe and Brian Cahill	Kevin Crease	Peter Barlow
Seven National News (Sydney, Melbourne, Adelaide, Perth)/The Big News (Brisbane)	Roger Climpson	Brian Naylor	David Hawkes	Alec MacAskill	Peter Waltham
Channel 10 News (Sydney)/Channel 0 News (Melbourne)	John Bailey	Geoff Raymond			
ABC News	James Dibble	Norman Griffiths	Peter Hitchener	Bob Caldicott	Peter Holland
Nightly News Winner	Unknown	Unknown	Unknown	Unknown	Unknown

1973

	Sydney	Melbourne	Brisbane	Adelaide	Perth
National Nine News	Brian Henderson	Eric Pearce	Don Seccombe and Paul Griffin	Kevin Crease	Peter Barlow
Seven National News (Sydney, Melbourne, Adelaide, Perth)/The Big News (Brisbane)	Roger Climpson	Brian Naylor	Brian Cahill	Alec MacAskill	Peter Waltham
Eyewitness News (Sydney, Melbourne)/Channel 10 News (Adelaide)	Eric Walters	Ralphe Neill		Roger Cardwell	
ABC News	James Dibble	Geoff Raymond	Unknown	Alan Hodgson	Peter Holland
Nightly News Winner	Unknown	Unknown	Unknown	Unknown	Unknown

1976

	Sydney	Melbourne	Brisbane	Adelaide	Perth
NewsCentre 9/9 Eyewitness News	Brian Henderson	Eric Pearce	Don Seccombe	Roger Cardwell	Russell Goodrick
Seven National/Eyewitness News	Roger Climpson	Brian Naylor	Mike Higgins	Alec MacAskill	Peter Waltham
Ten/Channel 0 Eyewitness News/NewsWatch 0	Eric Walters and Sonia Humphrey	Bruce Mansfield and Gail Jarvis (first female reader)	Brian Cahill	John Bok	
ABC News	James Dibble	Geoff Raymond	Unknown	Unknown	Peter Holland
Nightly News Winner	Unknown	Unknown	Unknown	Unknown	Unknown

1977

	Sydney	Melbourne	Brisbane	Adelaide	Perth
National Nine/9 Eyewitness News	Brian Henderson	Eric Pearce	Don Seccombe	Roger Cardwell and Caroline Ainsle	Russell Goodrick
Seven National/Eyewitness News	Roger Climpson	Brian Naylor	Mike Higgins	Kevin Crease	Peter Waltham
Ten/Channel 0 Eyewitness News/NewsWatch	Eric Walters and Sonia Humphrey	Bruce Mansfield	Brian Cahill	Noel O'Connor	
ABC News	James Dibble	Geoff Raymond	Unknown	Denise Marcos	Peter Holland
Nightly News Winner	Unknown	Unknown	Unknown	Unknown	Unknown

1978

	Sydney	Melbourne	Brisbane	Adelaide	Perth
National Nine/9 Eyewitness News	Brian Henderson	Eric Pearce	Don Seccombe and Paul Griffin	Roger Cardwell and Caroline Ainsle	Russell Goodrick
Seven National News	Roger Climpson	Brian Naylor	Mike Higgins	Kevin Crease	Peter Waltham
Ten/Channel 0 Eyewitness News	Eric Walters	Bruce Mansfield	Brian Cahill	Noel O'Connor	
ABC News	James Dibble	Geoff Raymond	Unknown	Denise Marcos	Peter Holland
Nightly News Winner	Unknown	Unknown	Unknown	Unknown	Unknown

== 1980–1989 ==
1980

	Sydney	Melbourne	Brisbane	Adelaide	Perth
National Nine News	Brian Henderson	Brian Naylor	Don Seccombe and Paul Griffin	Roger Cardwell and Caroline Ainsle	Russell Goodrick
Seven National News	Roger Climpson	Mal Walden	Mike Higgins	Kevin Crease	Peter Waltham
Ten/Channel 0 Eyewitness News (Melbourne until 21 January 1980)	John Bailey and Katrina Lee	David Johnston and Jana Wendt	Brian Cahill and Des McWilliam	Tony Dickinson	
ABC News	James Dibble	Geoff Raymond	Bruce Paige and Scott McKinlay	Denise Marcos	Peter Holland
Nightly News Winner	Unknown	Ten Eyewitness News	Unknown	Unknown	Unknown

1981

	Sydney	Melbourne	Brisbane	Adelaide	Perth
National Nine/Nine Action News	Brian Henderson	Brian Naylor	Don Seccombe and Paul Griffin	Roger Cardwell and Caroline Ainsle	Russell Goodrick
Seven National News	Roger Climpson	Mal Walden	Mike Higgins and Frank Warrick	Kevin Crease	Peter Waltham
Ten/Channel 0 Eyewitness News	Ron Wilson and Katrina Lee	David Johnston and Jana Wendt/Charles Slade	Des McWilliam and Brian Cahill	Tony Dickinson	
ABC News	James Dibble	Geoff Raymond	Bruce Paige and Scott McKinlay	Unknown	Peter Holland
Nightly News Winner	Ten Eyewitness News	Ten Eyewitness News	Unknown	Unknown	Unknown

1982

	Sydney	Melbourne	Brisbane	Adelaide	Perth
National Nine/Nine Action News	Brian Henderson	Brian Naylor	Don Seccombe and Paul Griffin	Roger Cardwell and Caroline Ainsle	Russell Goodrick
Seven National News	Ross Symonds	Mal Walden	Mike Higgins and Frank Warrick	Kevin Crease	Peter Waltham
Ten/Channel 0 Eyewitness News	Tim Webster and Katrina Lee	David Johnston and Charles Slade/Jo Pearson (since 26 January)	Des McWilliam and Jacki McDonald	Tony Dickinson and Graeme Goodings	
ABC News	Richard Morecroft	Graham Evans	Bruce Paige and Scott McKinlay	Clive Hale	Peter Holland
Nightly News Winner	Ten Eyewitness News	Ten Eyewitness News	Unknown	Unknown	Unknown

1983

	Sydney	Melbourne	Brisbane	Adelaide	Perth
National Nine/Nine Action News	Brian Henderson	Brian Naylor	Don Seccombe and Paul Griffin	Rob Kelvin and Caroline Ainsle	Greg Pearce and Russell Goodrick
Seven National News	Ross Symonds	Mal Walden	Mike Higgins and Frank Warrick	Kevin Crease	Peter Waltham
Ten/Channel 0 (later TV0) Eyewitness News	Tim Webster and Katrina Lee	David Johnston and Jo Pearson	Des McWilliam and Jacki McDonald	Denise Marcos, Tony Dickinson and Graeme Goodings	
ABC News	Richard Morecroft	Geoff Raymond	Bruce Paige and Scott McKinlay	Clive Hale	Peter Holland
Nightly News Winner	Ten Eyewitness News	Ten Eyewitness News	Seven National News	Ten Eyewitness News	Unknown

1984

	Sydney	Melbourne	Brisbane	Adelaide	Perth
National Nine/Nine Action News	Brian Henderson	Brian Naylor	Frank Warrick	Rob Kelvin and Caroline Ainsle	Greg Pearce and Anne Conti
Seven National News	Ross Symonds	Mal Walden	Mike Higgins	Kevin Crease and Anne Fulwood	Peter Waltham
Ten/TV0 Eyewitness News	Tim Webster and Katrina Lee	David Johnston and Jo Pearson	Des McWilliam and Kay McGrath	Graeme Goodings and Guy Blackmore	
ABC National	Richard Morecroft	Geoff Raymond and Ralphe Neill	Bruce Paige and Scott McKinlay	Clive Hale	Peter Holland
Nightly News Winner	Ten Eyewitness News	Ten Eyewitness News	Unknown	Ten Eyewitness News	Unknown

1985

	Sydney	Melbourne	Brisbane	Adelaide	Perth
National Nine/Nine Action News	Brian Henderson	Brian Naylor	Frank Warrick	Rob Kelvin and Caroline Ainsle	Greg Pearce and Anne Conti
Seven National News	Ross Symonds	Mal Walden	Mike Higgins and Nev Roberts	Kevin Crease and Anne Fulwood	Rick Ardon and Susannah Carr
Ten/TV0 Eyewitness News	Tim Webster and Katrina Lee resigned then Ann Sanders	David Johnston and Jo Pearson	Des McWilliam and Kay McGrath	Graeme Goodings and Guy Blackmore	
ABC National	Richard Morecroft and Geraldine Doogue	Ralphe Neill	Bruce Paige and Scott McKinlay	Clive Hale	Peter Holland
Nightly News Winner	Ten Eyewitness News	Ten Eyewitness News	Unknown	Ten Eyewitness News	Unknown

1986

	Sydney	Melbourne	Brisbane	Adelaide	Perth
National Nine/Nine Action News	Brian Henderson	Brian Naylor	Bruce Paige and Robin Parkin	Rob Kelvin and Caroline Ainsle	Peter Waltham and Anne Conti
Seven National News	Ross Symonds	Mal Walden	Mike Higgins and Frank Warrick	Kevin Crease and Anne Fulwood	Rick Ardon and Susannah Carr
Ten/TV0 Eyewitness News	Tim Webster and Ann Sanders	David Johnston and Jo Pearson	Des McWilliam and Kay McGrath	Graeme Goodings and Guy Blackmore	
ABC News	Richard Morecroft	Mary Delahunty	Rod Young	John Bok	Peter Holland
Nightly News Winner	Ten Eyewitness News	Ten Eyewitness News	Unknown	Ten Eyewitness News	Unknown

1987

	Sydney	Melbourne	Brisbane	Adelaide	Perth
National Nine News	Brian Henderson	Brian Naylor	Bruce Paige and Robin Parkin	Rob Kelvin and Caroline Ainslie, later Kevin Crease	Peter Waltham and Anne Conti
Seven National News	Ross Symonds	Mal Walden, later Greg Pearce	Frank Warrick, Nev Roberts and Donna Meiklejohn	Kevin Crease and Anne Fulwood, later Caroline Ainslie and Steven Whitham	Rick Ardon and Susannah Carr
Ten/TV0 Eyewitness News	Steve Liebmann and Robyn Johnston	David Johnston and Jo Pearson	Mike Higgins and Kay McGrath	Graeme Goodings and Guy Blackmore	
ABC News	Richard Morecroft	Mary Delahunty	Rod Young	John Bok	Peter Holland
Nightly News Winner	National Nine News	Ten Eyewitness News	National Nine News	Ten Eyewitness News	Unknown

By 27 December of that year, SAS and ADS exchanged affiliations and frequencies, SAS moving to 7 and ADS moving to the Channel 10 frequency.

1988

	Sydney	Melbourne	Brisbane	Adelaide	Perth
National Nine News	Brian Henderson	Brian Naylor	Bruce Paige and Robin Parkin	Kevin Crease and Rob Kelvin	Peter Waltham and Anne Conti
Seven National/Nightly News	Richard Zachariah and Ann Sanders	Jennifer Keyte and Glenn Taylor	Frank Warrick and Simmone Semmens	Graeme Goodings and Jeremy Cordeaux	Rick Ardon and Susannah Carr
Ten/TV0 Eyewitness News (September to November onward, Ten News/Brisbane Ten News, Perth edition launched by May)	Steve Liebmann and Geraldine Doogue	David Johnston, Mal Walden and Tracey Curro	Rob Readings and Chris Collins	Steve Whitham and Caroline Ainsle	Greg Pearce and Gina Pickering
ABC News	Richard Morecroft	Mary Delahunty	Rod Young	Jane Doyle	Peter Holland
Nightly News Winner	National Nine News	National Nine News	National Nine News	Unknown	Unknown

1989

	Sydney	Melbourne	Brisbane	Adelaide	Perth
National Nine News	Brian Henderson	Brian Naylor	Bruce Paige and Robin Parkin, later Mike London	Kevin Crease and Rob Kelvin	Peter Waltham and Anne Colti
Seven Nightly News	Roger Climpson and Ann Sanders	Jennifer Keyte and Glenn Taylor	Frank Warrick and Kay McGrath	Graeme Goodings and Jane Doyle	Rick Ardon and Susannah Carr
Ten News/Brisbane Ten News/Ten Eyewitness News	Steve Liebmann and Geraldine Doogue	David Johnston and Tracey Curro	Geoff Mullins and Anna McMahon	Keith Martyn and Caroline Ainsle	Greg Pearce and Gina Pickering
ABC News	Richard Morecroft	Mary Delahunty	Rod Young	Keith Conlon	Peter Holland
Nightly News Winner	National Nine News	National Nine News	National Nine News	National Nine News	National Nine News

== 1990–1999 ==
1990

	Sydney	Melbourne	Brisbane	Adelaide	Perth
National Nine News	Brian Henderson	Brian Naylor	Mike London and Robin Parkin	Kevin Crease and Rob Kelvin	Peter Waltham and Anne Conti
Seven Nightly News	Roger Climpson	Jennifer Keyte	Frank Warrick and Kay McGrath	Graeme Goodings and Jane Doyle	Rick Ardon and Susannah Carr
Ten Eyewitness/Evening News	Ian Leslie, later Eric Walters	David Johnston and Tracey Curro	Bruce Paige	Keith Martyn and Caroline Ainsle	Greg Pearce and Christine Parker
ABC News	Richard Morecroft	Mary Delahunty	Rod Young	Keith Conlon	Peter Holland
Nightly News Winner	National Nine News	National Nine News	National Nine News	National Nine News	National Nine News

1991

	Sydney	Melbourne	Brisbane	Adelaide	Perth
National Nine News	Brian Henderson	Brian Naylor	Mike London and Robin Parkin	Kevin Crease and Rob Kelvin	Liam Bartlett and Anne Conti
Seven Nightly News	Roger Climpson	Jennifer Keyte	Frank Warrick and Kay McGrath	Graeme Goodings and Jane Doyle	Rick Ardon and Susannah Carr
Ten Eyewitness News	Eric Walters, later Katrina Lee and John Mangos	David Johnston and Jo Pearson	Des McWilliams, later Glenn Taylor and Marie-Louise Theile	George Donikian	Greg Pearce and Christine Parker
ABC News	Richard Morecroft	Sue McIntosh	Rod Young	Keith Conlon	Peter Holland
Nightly News Winner	National Nine News	National Nine News	National Nine News	National Nine News	Seven Nightly News

1992

	Sydney	Melbourne	Brisbane	Adelaide	Perth
National Nine News	Brian Henderson	Brian Naylor	Mike London and Heather Foord	Kevin Crease and Rob Kelvin	Liam Bartlett and Tina Altieri
Seven Nightly News	Roger Climpson	Jennifer Keyte	Frank Warrick and Kay McGrath	Graeme Goodings and Jane Doyle	Rick Ardon and Susannah Carr
Ten Eyewitness News (First at Five since January)	Katrina Lee and Tim Webster	David Johnston and Jo Pearson	Glenn Taylor and Marie-Louise Theile	George Donikian and Nikki Dwyer	Greg Pearce and Christine Parker
ABC News	Richard Morecroft	Ian Henderson	Rod Young	Keith Conlon	Peter Holland
Nightly News Winner	National Nine News	National Nine News	National Nine News	National Nine News	Seven Nightly News

1993

	Sydney	Melbourne	Brisbane	Adelaide	Perth
National Nine News	Brian Henderson	Brian Naylor	Mike London and Heather Foord	Kevin Crease and Rob Kelvin	Liam Bartlett and Tina Altieri
Seven Nightly News	Roger Climpson	Jennifer Keyte	Frank Warrick and Kay McGrath	Graeme Goodings and Jane Doyle	Rick Ardon and Susannah Carr
Ten Eyewitness News, First at Five	Ron Wilson and Sandra Sully	David Johnston and Jo Pearson	Glenn Taylor and Marie-Louise Theile	George Donikian and Nikki Dwyer	Greg Pearce and Christine Parker
ABC News	Richard Morecroft	Ian Henderson	Rod Young	Shane Dannatt	Peter Holland
Nightly News Winner	National Nine News	National Nine News	National Nine News	National Nine News	Seven Nightly News

1994

	Sydney	Melbourne	Brisbane	Adelaide	Perth
National Nine News	Brian Henderson	Brian Naylor	Mike London and Heather Foord	Kevin Crease and Rob Kelvin	Liam Bartlett and Tina Altieri
Seven Nightly News	Roger Climpson	Jennifer Keyte	Frank Warrick and Kay McGrath	Graeme Goodings and Jane Doyle	Rick Ardon and Susannah Carr
Ten Eyewitness News, First at Five (Later, Ten News, First at Five)	Ron Wilson and Juanita Phillips	David Johnston and Jo Pearson/Marie-Louise Theile	Glenn Taylor and Tracey Spicer	George Donikian and Nikki Dwyer	Greg Pearce and Christine Parker
ABC News	Richard Morecroft	Ian Henderson	Rod Young	Shane Dannatt	Peter Holland
Nightly News Winner	National Nine News	National Nine News	National Nine News	National Nine News	Seven Nightly News

1995

	Sydney	Melbourne	Brisbane	Adelaide	Perth
National Nine News	Brian Henderson	Brian Naylor	Mike London and Heather Foord	Kevin Crease and Rob Kelvin	Terry Willesee and Tina Altieri
Seven Nightly News	Roger Climpson / Ann Sanders	Jennifer Keyte	Frank Warrick and Kay McGrath	Graeme Goodings and Jane Doyle	Rick Ardon and Susannah Carr
Ten News, First at Five	Ron Wilson and Juanita Phillips	David Johnston and Marie-Louise Theile	Glenn Taylor and Tracey Spicer	George Donikian and Nikki Dwyer	Greg Pearce and Christine Parker
ABC News	Richard Morecroft	Ian Henderson	Rod Young	Shane Dannatt	Peter Holland
Nightly News Winner	National Nine News	National Nine News	National Nine News	National Nine News	Seven Nightly News

1996

	Sydney	Melbourne	Brisbane	Adelaide	Perth
National Nine News	Brian Henderson	Brian Naylor	Bruce Paige and Heather Foord	Kevin Crease and Rob Kelvin	Terry Willesee and Tina Altieri
Seven Nightly News	Ann Sanders	David Johnston	Frank Warrick and Kay McGrath	Graeme Goodings and Jane Doyle	Rick Ardon and Susannah Carr
Ten News, First at Five	Ron Wilson and Jessica Rowe	Mal Walden and Jennifer Hansen	Glenn Taylor and Tracey Spicer	George Donikian and Nikki Dwyer	Greg Pearce and Christina Morrissey
ABC News	Richard Morecroft	Ian Henderson	Rod Young	John Lombard	Peter Holland
Nightly News Winner	National Nine News	National Nine News	National Nine News	National Nine News	Seven Nightly News

1997

	Sydney	Melbourne	Brisbane	Adelaide	Perth
National Nine News	Brian Henderson	Brian Naylor	Bruce Paige and Heather Foord	Kevin Crease and Rob Kelvin	Terry Willesee and Tina Altieri
Seven Nightly News	Ann Sanders	David Johnston	Frank Warrick and Kay McGrath	Graeme Goodings and Jane Doyle	Rick Ardon and Susannah Carr
Ten News, First at Five	Ron Wilson and Jessica Rowe	Mal Walden and Jennifer Hansen	Glenn Taylor and Marie-Louise Theile	George Donikian and Nikki Dwyer	Greg Pearce and Christina Morrissey
ABC News	Richard Morecroft	Ian Henderson	Rod Young	Michael Smyth	Peter Holland
Nightly News Winner	National Nine News	National Nine News	National Nine News	National Nine News	Seven Nightly News

1998

	Sydney	Melbourne	Brisbane	Adelaide	Perth
National Nine News	Brian Henderson	Brian Naylor (retired at the end of that year)	Bruce Paige and Heather Foord	Kevin Crease and Rob Kelvin	Terry Willesee / Peter Holland and Tina Altieri
Seven Nightly News	Ann Sanders and Ross Symonds	David Johnston	Frank Warrick and Kay McGrath	Graeme Goodings and Jane Doyle	Rick Ardon and Susannah Carr
Ten News, First at Five	Ron Wilson and Jessica Rowe	Mal Walden and Jennifer Hansen	Glenn Taylor and Marie-Louise Theile	George Donikian and Nikki Dwyer	Greg Pearce and Christina Morrissey
ABC News	Richard Morecroft	Ian Henderson	Rod Young	Michael Smyth	Peter Holland / Deborah Knight
Nightly News Winner	National Nine News	National Nine News	National Nine News	National Nine News	Seven Nightly News

1999

	Sydney	Melbourne	Brisbane	Adelaide	Perth
National Nine News	Brian Henderson	Peter Hitchener	Bruce Paige and Heather Foord	Kevin Crease and Rob Kelvin	Peter Holland and Tina Altieri
Seven Nightly News	Ann Sanders and Ross Symonds	David Johnston and Anne Fulwood	Frank Warrick and Kay McGrath	Graeme Goodings and Jane Doyle	Rick Ardon and Susannah Carr
Ten News, First at Five	Ron Wilson and Jessica Rowe	Mal Walden and Jennifer Hansen	Geoff Mullins and Marie-Louise Theile	George Donikian and Nikki Dwyer	Greg Pearce and Christina Morrissey
ABC News	Richard Morecroft	Ian Henderson	Rod Young	Michael Smyth	Deborah Kennedy
Nightly News Winner	National Nine News	National Nine News	National Nine News	National Nine News	Seven Nightly News

== 2000–2009 ==
2000

	Sydney	Melbourne	Brisbane	Adelaide	Perth
National Nine News	Brian Henderson	Peter Hitchener	Bruce Paige and Heather Foord	Kevin Crease and Rob Kelvin	Peter Holland and Tina Altieri
Seven Nightly News (Later, Seven News)	Ann Sanders and Ross Symonds	David Johnston and Anne Fulwood	Frank Warrick and Kay McGrath	Graeme Goodings and Jane Doyle	Rick Ardon and Susannah Carr
Ten News	Ron Wilson and Jessica Rowe	Mal Walden and Jennifer Hansen	Geoff Mullins and Marie-Louise Theile	George Donikian and Nikki Dwyer (via Melbourne)	Greg Pearce and Christina Morrissey (via Sydney)
ABC News	Richard Morecroft	Ian Henderson	Rod Young	Kelly Nestor	Deborah Kennedy
Nightly News Winner	National Nine News	National Nine News	National Nine News	National Nine News	Seven News

2001

	Sydney	Melbourne	Brisbane	Adelaide	Perth
National Nine News	Brian Henderson	Peter Hitchener	Bruce Paige and Heather Foord	Kevin Crease and Rob Kelvin	Peter Holland and Tina Altieri
Seven News	Ann Sanders and Ross Symonds	Peter Mitchell	Frank Warrick and Kay McGrath	Graeme Goodings and Jane Doyle	Rick Ardon and Susannah Carr
Ten News	Ron Wilson and Jessica Rowe	Mal Walden and Jennifer Hansen	Geoff Mullins and Marie-Louise Theile	George Donikian and Kelly Nestor (via Melbourne)	Greg Pearce and Celina Edmonds (via Sydney)
ABC News	Richard Morecroft	Ian Henderson	Rod Young	Michael Smyth	Deborah Kennedy
Nightly News Winner	National Nine News	National Nine News	National Nine News	Seven News	Seven News

2002

	Sydney	Melbourne	Brisbane	Adelaide	Perth
National Nine News	Brian Henderson (retired at the end of that year)	Peter Hitchener	Bruce Paige and Jillian Whiting	Kevin Crease and Rob Kelvin	Peter Holland and Dixie Marshall
Seven News	Ann Sanders and Ross Symonds	Peter Mitchell	Kay McGrath	Graeme Goodings and Jane Doyle	Rick Ardon and Susannah Carr
Ten News	Ron Wilson and Jessica Rowe	Mal Walden and Jennifer Hansen	Geoff Mullins and Marie-Louise Theile	George Donikian and Kelly Nestor (via Melbourne)	Greg Pearce and Celina Edmonds (via Sydney)
ABC News	Tony Eastley	Ian Henderson	Rod Young, later Andrew Lofthouse	Dominique Schwartz	Deborah Kennedy
Nightly News Winner	National Nine News	National Nine News	National Nine News	Seven News	Seven News

2003

	Sydney	Melbourne	Brisbane	Adelaide	Perth
National Nine News	Jim Waley	Peter Hitchener	Bruce Paige and Jillian Whiting	Kevin Crease and Rob Kelvin	Dixie Marshall and Sonia Vinci
Seven News	Ann Sanders and Ross Symonds (retired at the end of that year)	Peter Mitchell	Rod Young and Kay McGrath	Graeme Goodings and Jane Doyle	Rick Ardon and Susannah Carr
Ten News	Ron Wilson and Jessica Rowe	Mal Walden and Jennifer Hansen	Geoff Mullins and Marie-Louise Theile	George Donikian and Kelly Nestor (via Melbourne)	Ron Wilson and Celina Edmonds (via Sydney)
ABC News	Tony Eastley and Juanita Phillips	Ian Henderson	Andrew Lofthouse	Dominique Schwartz	Deborah Kennedy
Nightly News Winner	National Nine News	National Nine News	National Nine News	Seven News	Seven News

2004

	Sydney	Melbourne	Brisbane	Adelaide	Perth
National Nine News	Jim Waley (retired at the end of that year)	Peter Hitchener	Bruce Paige and Heather Foord	Kevin Crease and Rob Kelvin	Dixie Marshall and Sonia Vinci
Seven News	Ian Ross	Peter Mitchell	Rod Young and Kay McGrath	John Riddell and Jane Doyle	Rick Ardon and Susannah Carr
Ten News	Ron Wilson and Jessica Rowe	Mal Walden and Jennifer Hansen	Geoff Mullins and Marie-Louise Theile	George Donikian and Kelly Nestor (via Melbourne)	Ron Wilson (via Sydney)
ABC News	Juanita Phillips	Ian Henderson	Andrew Lofthouse	Dominique Schwartz	Tom Baddeley
Nightly News Winner	National Nine News	National Nine News	National Nine News	Seven News	Seven News

2005

	Sydney	Melbourne	Brisbane	Adelaide	Perth
National Nine News	Mark Ferguson	Peter Hitchener	Bruce Paige and Heather Foord	Kevin Crease and Rob Kelvin	Dixie Marshall and Sonia Vinci
Seven News	Ian Ross	Peter Mitchell	Rod Young and Kay McGrath	John Riddell and Jane Doyle	Rick Ardon and Susannah Carr
Ten News	Ron Wilson and Jessica Rowe (left that year)	Mal Walden and Jennifer Hansen (left in January, 2006)	Bill McDonald and Marie-Louise Theile	George Donikian and Kelly Nestor (via Melbourne)	Ron Wilson (via Sydney)
ABC News	Juanita Phillips	Ian Henderson	Andrew Lofthouse	Dominique Schwartz	Paul Lockyer, later Alicia Gorey
Nightly News Winner	Seven News	National Nine News	National Nine News	Seven News	Seven News

2006

	Sydney	Melbourne	Brisbane	Adelaide	Perth
National Nine News	Mark Ferguson	Peter Hitchener	Bruce Paige and Heather Foord	Kevin Crease and Rob Kelvin	Dixie Marshall and Sonia Vinci
Seven News	Ian Ross	Peter Mitchell	Rod Young and Kay McGrath	John Riddell and Jane Doyle	Rick Ardon and Susannah Carr
Ten News	Ron Wilson and Deborah Knight	Mal Walden and Helen Kapalos	Bill McDonald and Marie-Louise Theile	George Donikian and Rebecca Morse (via Melbourne)	Tim Webster and Charmaine Dragun (via Sydney)
ABC News	Juanita Phillips	Ian Henderson	Andrew Lofthouse	Dominique Schwartz	Alicia Gorey
Nightly News Winner	Seven News	National Nine News	National Nine News	Seven News	Seven News

2007

	Sydney	Melbourne	Brisbane	Adelaide	Perth
National Nine News	Mark Ferguson	Peter Hitchener	Bruce Paige and Heather Foord	Kevin Crease and Rob Kelvin (Crease died in April), Rob Kelvin (solo for rest of that year)	Dixie Marshall and Sonia Vinci
Seven News	Ian Ross	Peter Mitchell	Rod Young and Kay McGrath	John Riddell and Jane Doyle	Rick Ardon and Susannah Carr
Ten News	Ron Wilson and Deborah Knight	Mal Walden and Helen Kapalos	Bill McDonald and Marie-Louise Theile (resigned in October and left at end of that year)	George Donikian and Rebecca Morse (via Melbourne)	Tim Webster (retired at the end of that year) and Charmaine Dragun (died in November) (via Sydney)
ABC News	Juanita Phillips	Ian Henderson	Andrew Lofthouse	Dominique Schwartz	Paul Lockyer
Nightly News Winner	Seven News	Tied between Seven News and National Nine News	Seven News	Seven News	Seven News

2008

	Sydney	Melbourne	Brisbane	Adelaide	Perth
National Nine News (later, Nine News)	Mark Ferguson	Peter Hitchener	Bruce Paige and Heather Foord	Rob Kelvin and Kelly Nestor	Greg Pearce and Dixie Marshall
Seven News	Ian Ross	Peter Mitchell	Rod Young and Kay McGrath	John Riddell and Jane Doyle	Rick Ardon and Susannah Carr
Ten News at Five	Ron Wilson and Deborah Knight	Mal Walden and Helen Kapalos	Bill McDonald and Georgina Lewis	George Donikian and Rebecca Morse (via Melbourne)	Narelda Jacobs (presented from Sydney and mid-year production returned to Perth)
ABC News	Juanita Phillips	Ian Henderson	Andrew Lofthouse	Dominique Schwartz	Karina Carvalho
Nightly News Winner	Seven News	Seven News	Seven News	Seven News	Seven News

2009

	Sydney	Melbourne	Brisbane	Adelaide	Perth
Nine News	Peter Overton	Peter Hitchener	Bruce Paige, later Andrew Lofthouse and Melissa Downes	Rob Kelvin and Kelly Nestor	Greg Pearce and Dixie Marshall
Seven News	Ian Ross (Retired at the end of the year)	Peter Mitchell	Rod Young and Kay McGrath	John Riddell and Jane Doyle	Rick Ardon and Susannah Carr
Ten News at Five	Bill Woods and Deborah Knight	Mal Walden and Helen Kapalos	Bill McDonald and Georgina Lewis	George Donikian and Rebecca Morse (via Melbourne)	Narelda Jacobs
ABC News	Juanita Phillips	Ian Henderson	David Curnow	Dominique Schwartz	Karina Carvalho
Nightly News Winner	Seven News	Seven News	Seven News	Seven News	Seven News

== 2010–2019 ==
2010

	Sydney	Melbourne	Brisbane	Adelaide	Perth
Nine News	Peter Overton	Peter Hitchener	Andrew Lofthouse and Melissa Downes	Rob Kelvin (Nestor sacked in December 2009. Kelvin solo from January until 19 February. Then joined by Michael Smyth from 22 February. Kelvin to retire on 31 December after 32 years at NWS-9.)	Greg Pearce and Dixie Marshall
Seven News	Chris Bath	Peter Mitchell	Rod Young and Kay McGrath	John Riddell and Jane Doyle	Rick Ardon and Susannah Carr
Ten News at Five	Bill Woods and Deborah Knight	Mal Walden and Helen Kapalos	Bill McDonald and Georgina Lewis	George Donikian and Rebecca Morse (via Melbourne)	Narelda Jacobs
ABC News	Juanita Phillips	Ian Henderson	David Curnow	Dominique Schwartz (until July. Moved to become ABC's New Zealand correspondent) Jessica Harmsen (July onwards)	Karina Carvalho
Nightly News Winner	Seven News	Seven News	Seven News	Seven News	Seven News

2011

	Sydney	Melbourne	Brisbane	Adelaide	Perth
Nine News	Peter Overton	Peter Hitchener	Andrew Lofthouse and Melissa Downes	Kate Collins and Michael Smyth	Greg Pearce
Seven News	Chris Bath	Peter Mitchell	Rod Young and Kay McGrath	John Riddell and Jane Doyle	Rick Ardon and Susannah Carr
Ten News at Five	Bill Woods and Deborah Knight (Sandra Sully from 3 October)	Mal Walden and Helen Kapalos	Bill McDonald and Georgina Lewis	Rebecca Morse (Wednesday to Friday) and Belinda Heggen (Monday & Tuesday)	Craig Smart & Narelda Jacobs
ABC News	Juanita Phillips	Ian Henderson	David Curnow	Jessica Harmsen	Karina Carvalho
Nightly News Winner	Nine News	Seven News	Seven News	Seven News	Seven News

2012

	Sydney	Melbourne	Brisbane	Adelaide	Perth
Nine News	Peter Overton	Peter Hitchener	Andrew Lofthouse and Melissa Downes	Kate Collins	Greg Pearce
Seven News	Chris Bath	Peter Mitchell	Rod Young and Kay McGrath	John Riddell and Jane Doyle	Rick Ardon and Susannah Carr
Ten News at Five	Sandra Sully and Bill Woods	Mal Walden and Helen Kapalos	Bill McDonald and Georgina Lewis	Rebecca Morse	Narelda Jacobs and Craig Smart
ABC News	Juanita Phillips	Ian Henderson	David Curnow	Jessica Harmsen	James McHale
Nightly News Winner	Nine News	Nine News	Seven News	Seven News	Seven News

2013

	Sydney	Melbourne	Brisbane	Adelaide	Perth
Nine News	Peter Overton	Peter Hitchener	Andrew Lofthouse and Melissa Downes	Kate Collins	Tim McMillan
Seven News	Chris Bath	Peter Mitchell	Sharyn Ghidella and Bill McDonald	John Riddell and Jane Doyle	Rick Ardon and Susannah Carr
Ten News at Five (Later Ten Eyewitness News)	Sandra Sully	Mal Walden (Mon–Wed) (due to his upcoming retirement that December); Stephen Quartermain (Thur & Fri)	Georgina Lewis	Rebecca Morse	Narelda Jacobs
ABC News	Juanita Phillips	Ian Henderson	Karina Carvalho	Jessica Harmsen	James McHale
Nightly News Winner	Nine News	Nine News	Nine News	Seven News	Seven News

2014

	Sydney	Melbourne	Brisbane	Adelaide	Perth
Nine News	Peter Overton	Peter Hitchener	Andrew Lofthouse and Melissa Downes	Kate Collins and Brenton Ragless	Tim McMillan and Libby Stone
Seven News	Mark Ferguson	Peter Mitchell	Sharyn Ghidella and Bill McDonald	John Riddell and Jane Doyle	Rick Ardon and Susannah Carr
Ten Eyewitness News	Sandra Sully and Hugh Riminton	Stephen Quartermain and Candice Wyatt (starting November)	Georgina Lewis	Rebecca Morse	Narelda Jacobs
ABC News	Juanita Phillips	Ian Henderson	Karina Carvalho	Jessica Harmsen	James McHale
Nightly News Winner	Nine News	Nine News	Nine News	Seven News	Seven News

2015

	Sydney	Melbourne	Brisbane	Adelaide	Perth
Nine News	Peter Overton	Peter Hitchener	Andrew Lofthouse and Melissa Downes	Kate Collins and Brenton Ragless	Tim McMillan and Emmy Kubainski
Seven News	Mark Ferguson	Peter Mitchell	Sharyn Ghidella and Bill McDonald	John Riddell and Jane Doyle	Rick Ardon and Susannah Carr
Ten Eyewitness News	Sandra Sully and Hugh Riminton	Stephen Quartermain and Candice Wyatt	Georgina Lewis and Lachlan Kennedy (beginning September)	Rebecca Morse	Narelda Jacobs
ABC News	Juanita Phillips	Ian Henderson	Karina Carvalho	Jessica Harmsen	James McHale
Nightly News Winner	Nine News	Nine News	Nine News	Seven News	Seven News

2016

	Sydney	Melbourne	Brisbane	Adelaide	Perth
Nine News	Peter Overton	Peter Hitchener	Andrew Lofthouse and Melissa Downes	Kate Collins and Brenton Ragless	Tim McMillan and Emmy Kubainski
Seven News	Mark Ferguson	Peter Mitchell	Sharyn Ghidella and Bill McDonald	John Riddell and Jane Doyle	Rick Ardon and Susannah Carr
Ten Eyewitness News	Sandra Sully and Hugh Riminton	Stephen Quartermain and Candice Wyatt	Georgina Lewis and Lachlan Kennedy	Rebecca Morse	Narelda Jacobs
ABC News	Juanita Phillips	Ian Henderson	Karina Carvalho	Jessica Harmsen	James McHale
Nightly News Winner	Nine News	Nine News	Nine News	Seven News	Seven News

2017

	Sydney	Melbourne	Brisbane	Adelaide	Perth
Nine News	Peter Overton	Peter Hitchener	Andrew Lofthouse and Melissa Downes	Kate Collins and Brenton Ragless	Tim McMillan and Emmy Kubainski
Seven News	Mark Ferguson	Peter Mitchell	Sharyn Ghidella and Bill McDonald	John Riddell and Jane Doyle	Rick Ardon and Susannah Carr
Ten Eyewitness News	Sandra Sully	Stephen Quartermain	Georgina Lewis	Rebecca Morse	Narelda Jacobs
ABC News	Juanita Phillips	Ian Henderson	Karina Carvalho	Jessica Harmsen	James McHale
Nightly News Winner	Nine News	Nine News	Nine News	Seven News	Seven News

2018

	Sydney	Melbourne	Brisbane	Adelaide	Perth
Nine News	Peter Overton	Peter Hitchener	Andrew Lofthouse and Melissa Downes	Kate Collins and Brenton Ragless	Michael Thomson
Seven News	Mark Ferguson	Peter Mitchell	Sharyn Ghidella and Bill McDonald until March 2018, then Max Futcher	John Riddell and Jane Doyle	Rick Ardon and Susannah Carr
Ten Eyewitness News (later 10 News First)	Sandra Sully	Stephen Quartermain until June 2018, then Jennifer Keyte	Georgina Lewis	Rebecca Morse	Narelda Jacobs
ABC News	Juanita Phillips	Ian Henderson until October 2018, then Tamara Oudyn	Matt Wordsworth	Jessica Harmsen	James McHale
Nightly News Winner	Nine News	Nine News	Seven News	Seven News	Seven News

2019

	Sydney	Melbourne	Brisbane	Adelaide	Perth
Nine News	Peter Overton	Peter Hitchener	Andrew Lofthouse and Melissa Downes	Kate Collins and Brenton Ragless	Michael Thomson
Seven News	Mark Ferguson	Peter Mitchell	Sharyn Ghidella and Max Futcher	John Riddell (Retired 6 December) and Jane Doyle	Rick Ardon and Susannah Carr
10 News First	Sandra Sully	Jennifer Keyte	Georgina Lewis	Rebecca Morse	Narelda Jacobs
ABC News	Juanita Phillips	Tamara Oudyn	Matt Wordsworth	Jessica Harmsen	James McHale
Nightly News Winner	Nine News	Nine News	Seven News	Seven News	Seven News

== 2020–present ==
2020

	Sydney	Melbourne	Brisbane	Adelaide	Perth
Nine News	Peter Overton	Peter Hitchener	Andrew Lofthouse and Melissa Downes	Kate Collins and Brenton Ragless	Michael Thomson
Seven News	Mark Ferguson	Peter Mitchell	Sharyn Ghidella and Max Futcher	Jane Doyle	Rick Ardon and Susannah Carr
10 News First	Sandra Sully	Jennifer Keyte	Georgina Lewis until 11 September, then Sandra Sully from Sydney	Rebecca Morse until 11 September, then Jennifer Keyte from Melbourne	Monika Kos until 11 September, then Narelda Jacobs from Sydney
ABC News	Juanita Phillips	Tamara Oudyn	Matt Wordsworth	Jessica Harmsen	James McHale until 11 September, then Pamela Medlen
Nightly News Winner	Nine News	Nine News	Nine News	Seven News	Seven News

2021

	Sydney	Melbourne	Brisbane	Adelaide	Perth
Nine News	Peter Overton	Peter Hitchener	Andrew Lofthouse and Melissa Downes	Kate Collins and Brenton Ragless	Michael Thomson
Seven News	Mark Ferguson	Peter Mitchell	Sharyn Ghidella and Max Futcher	Jane Doyle	Rick Ardon and Susannah Carr
10 News First	Sandra Sully	Jennifer Keyte	Sandra Sully (Via Sydney)	Jennifer Keyte (Via Melbourne)	Narelda Jacobs (Via Sydney)
ABC News	Juanita Phillips	Tamara Oudyn	Matt Wordsworth	Jessica Harmsen	Pamela Medlen
Nightly News Winner	Nine News	Nine News	Nine News	Seven News	Seven News

2022

	Sydney	Melbourne	Brisbane	Adelaide	Perth
Nine News	Peter Overton	Peter Hitchener	Andrew Lofthouse and Melissa Downes	Kate Collins and Brenton Ragless	Michael Thomson
Seven News	Mark Ferguson	Peter Mitchell	Sharyn Ghidella and Max Futcher	Jane Doyle (retired 15 December), then Rosanna Mangiarelli and Will Goodings	Rick Ardon and Susannah Carr
10 News First	Sandra Sully	Jennifer Keyte	Sandra Sully (Via Sydney)	Jennifer Keyte (Via Melbourne)	Narelda Jacobs (Via Sydney)
ABC News	Juanita Phillips	Tamara Oudyn	Matt Wordsworth	Jessica Harmsen	Pamela Medlen
Nightly News Winner	Nine News	Seven News	Nine News	Seven News	Seven News

2023

	Sydney	Melbourne	Brisbane	Adelaide	Perth
Nine News	Peter Overton	Peter Hitchener	Andrew Lofthouse and Melissa Downes	Kate Collins and Brenton Ragless	Michael Thomson
Seven News	Mark Ferguson	Peter Mitchell	Sharyn Ghidella and Max Futcher	Rosanna Mangiarelli and Will Goodings	Rick Ardon and Susannah Carr
10 News First	Sandra Sully	Jennifer Keyte	Sandra Sully (Via Sydney)	Jennifer Keyte (Via Melbourne) until February then Kate Freebairn from Sydney	Narelda Jacobs (Via Sydney) until 9 January, then Natalie Forrest from Perth
ABC News	Juanita Phillips until 10 September, then Jeremy Fernandez	Tamara Oudyn	Matt Wordsworth until 2 March, then Jessica van Vonderen	Jessica Harmsen	Pamela Medlen
Nightly News Winner	Nine News	Seven News	Nine News	Seven News	Seven News

2024

	Sydney	Melbourne	Brisbane	Adelaide	Perth
Nine News	Peter Overton	Alicia Loxley and Tom Steinfort	Andrew Lofthouse Retire 20 Jan and Melissa Downes	Kate Collins and Brenton Ragless	Michael Thomson
Seven News	Mark Ferguson and Angela Cox (from 8 September)	Peter Mitchell	Max Futcher and Sharyn Ghidella until July, then Sarah Greenhalgh (from 21 October)	Rosanna Mangiarelli and Will Goodings	Rick Ardon and Susannah Carr
10 News First	Sandra Sully	Jennifer Keyte	Sharyn Ghidella (from 2 September)	Kate Freebairn	Natalie Forrest
ABC News	Jeremy Fernandez	Tamara Oudyn	Jessica van Vonderen	Jessica Harmsen	Pamela Medlen
Nightly News Winner	Nine News	Nine News	Nine News	Seven News	Seven News

2025

	Sydney	Melbourne	Brisbane	Adelaide	Perth
Nine News	Peter Overton	Alicia Loxley and Tom Steinfort	Melissa Downes and Joel Dry (from 18 August)	Brenton Ragless	Michael Thomson
Seven News	Mark Ferguson and Angela Cox	Peter Mitchell	Max Futcher and Sarah Greenhalgh	Rosanna Mangiarelli and Will Goodings	Rick Ardon and Susannah Carr
10 News First (later 10 News)	Sandra Sully	Jennifer Keyte	Sharyn Ghidella	Kate Freebairn	Natalie Forrest
ABC News	Jeremy Fernandez	Tamara Oudyn	Jessica van Vonderen	Jessica Harmsen	Pamela Medlen
Nightly News Winner	Nine News	Nine News	Nine News	Seven News	Seven News

2026

	Sydney	Melbourne	Brisbane	Adelaide	Perth
Nine News	Peter Overton	Alicia Loxley and Tom Steinfort	Melissa Downes and Joel Dry	Brenton Ragless	Michael Thomson
Seven News	Mark Ferguson and Angela Cox	Peter Mitchell	Max Futcher and Sarah Greenhalgh	Rosanna Mangiarelli and Will Goodings	Tim McMillan and Angela Tsun
10 News	Sandra Sully	Jennifer Keyte	Sharyn Ghidella	Kate Freebairn	Natalie Forrest
ABC News	Jeremy Fernandez	Tamara Oudyn	Jessica van Vonderen	Jessica Harmsen	Pamela Medlen

== See also ==
- Television ratings in Australia
- List of Australian television presenters
- List of Australian television news services
