= Jessica Harmsen =

Jessica Harmsen (née Schacht) is the weeknight presenter for ABC News, in Adelaide, and a journalist.

== Career ==
Harmsen began with the ABC as a reporter in Queensland, before moving to Sydney, then arriving in Adelaide in 2005.

She became a reporter and substitute presenter, before becoming weekend presenter following the departure of Michael Smyth.

In 2010, Harmsen became weeknight presenter following Dominique Schwartz's move to the ABC's New Zealand bureau.

In 2014 she went on maternity leave and was replaced by Emma Rebellato, returning in January 2016.

== Personal life ==
She began presenting shortly after marrying state political correspondent Nick Harmsen. On 20 November 2014 Jessica Harmsen gave birth to a baby girl.
