= Jo Pearson =

Australian television presenter

- Education: University of Queensland
- Occupations: journalist and television presenter
- Known for: reading television news
- Television: Ten Eyewitness News, Live at Five, Body and Soul

Jo Pearson is an Australian television presenter and journalist.

== Career ==
Pearson is perhaps best known for her association with Network Ten throughout the 1980s and early 1990s. After working at TVQ-0 in Brisbane, she transferred to ATV-0 in Melbourne where she co-presented Ten Eyewitness News with David Johnston from 1982 to 1987 and again from 1991 to 1993.

In 1988, Pearson was crowned as a Moomba monarch during Melbourne's annual Moomba Festival.

Pearson was poached by the Nine Network in 1988 who reportedly lured her across from Ten with a contract worth approximately one million dollars. This was reportedly in an attempt by Nine to "warehouse" Pearson just to break up the successful pairing of Pearson and Johnston. While at Nine in 1988, she co-hosted a national news magazine program Live at Five with Terry Willesee before also hosting a Saturday afternoon lifestyle program Body and Soul. Both programs struggled and were ultimately axed in 1989. This was after Live at Five was renamed to Eye on Australia in early 1989 with Willesee hosting the show solo. Pearson and Willesse's Live at 5 was remembered in 2009 when Nine again attempted an afternoon news magazine program when they launched This Afternoon.

Pearson returned to Ten in 1991 where she resumed her on-air partnership on Ten Eyewitness News with Johnston. Speaking to TV Week about her time at Nine, Pearson said: "In hindsight you could say it was a mistake for me to go, but at the time I went with promise and expectation of a new career... I think I had a lot of bad luck. There were political and geographical differences that made it extremely difficult for me and the shows.”

In 1991, she co-hosted Ten's Young Achiever Awards telecast with Tim Webster.

In 1992, Pearson was the centre of controversy when she changed her hair colour from blonde to auburn. This annoyed executives at Ten who ordered her to immediately change her hair colour back to the way it was. In 2012, commenting on Tracey Spicer's article in The Sydney Morning Herald detailing the misogyny Spicer had encountered during her television career, Pearson observed that "some things never change, sadly".

In 1993, she left Ten and was replaced by Marie-Louise Theile. Pearson then went on to be a panelist on TVTV on ABC TV.

Pearson later established Media Strategies, a media training organisation specialising in disaster management and public speaking. In 2010, Pearson was dividing her time between Melbourne and Ealing in London and by 2012, she was living in Hertfordshire in the UK and working as a producer, director and voiceover artist.

== Personal life ==
Pearson was previously married to weather presenter Rob Gell who she worked with on Ten Eyewitness News. In 2012, their son Nicholas Gell graduated from the National Institute of Dramatic Art.

== Legacy ==
Pearson is among a group of prolific female news presenters of the 1980s who are said to have inspired the acclaimed ABC TV drama The Newsreader.

Media offices
Preceded by Jana Wendt	Ten Eyewitness News; Weeknight co-presenter with David Johnston; 1982 – 1987	Succeeded by Tracey Curro
Preceded by Tracey Curro	Ten Eyewitness News; Weeknight co-presenter with David Johnston; 1991 – 1993	Succeeded by Marie-Louise Theile
