= John Riddell (presenter) =

Australian former television and radio presenter

- Born: 23 September 1956 (age 68); Semaphore, South Australia
- Occupation(s): radio and television presenter
- Known for: co-anchoring Seven News in Adelaide; co-hosting the Mix 102.3 breakfast show
- Television: Seven News, Today Tonight, The World Around Us, The Crows Show, SA Decides, SA Weekender: Book Them Out

John Anthony Riddell (born 23 September 1956) is an Australian former television and radio presenter.

He is best known for his thirty-year association with the Seven Network's television station in Adelaide, SAS-7 where he anchored Seven News bulletins from 1990 to his retirement in late 2019.

== Career ==
Riddell began his media career with a cadetship at Messenger Newspapers in Adelaide. Riddell then moved into radio where he worked at 5DN and then as a foreign correspondent for the Macquarie Radio Network. While in London covering the assassination of Lord Louis Mountbatten for Macquarie in 1979, Riddell caused a security scare and was ejected from Australia House when he was mistaken for a bomber when he was seen with an unscrewed telephone receiver with its wires connected to a small black cassette recorder as he attempted to send a pre-recorded report back to Australia.

He then moved into television, initially working at TVW-7 in Perth before returning to Adelaide where he started working at NWS-9 in 1981.

After spending nine years at NWS-9, he moved to SAS-7 where he anchored the weekend Seven News bulletins. When Graeme Goodings moved to weekends as he recovered from cancer, Riddell moved to the weeknight bulletin in 2005 where he formed an enduring on-air partnership with Jane Doyle. While at Seven, Riddell also occasionally hosted the Adelaide edition of Today Tonight. He also hosted the documentary series The World Around Us and the local AFL program The Crows Show, despite being an ambassador for Port Adelaide.

He also anchored Seven's coverage of South Australian state elections. However in a 2019 interview, he admitted that he would have said no to hosting election coverage if he'd been able to.

Riddell also continued to work in radio. From late 2007 to early 2012, he was a co-host on the Mix 102.3 breakfast show, alongside Jason "Snowy" Carter and Jodie Oddy. With Carter, Riddell inaugurated an annual charity fundraiser called the West End Mighty River Run to raise money for Novita Children's Services in 2006. Riddell briefly returned in radio in June 2012 filling in for Dale Lewis on Triple M Adelaide's Hot Breakfast.

After his 63rd birthday in September 2019, Riddell announced his retirement. His co-anchored his final Seven News bulletin on 6 December 2019. After his retirement, Jane Doyle continued as the sole anchor of the bulletin until her own retirement in late 2022.

Following the South Australian bushfires of late 2019 and early 2020 which affected the Adelaide Hills and Kangaroo Island, Riddell returned to Seven co-host a special "Book Them Out" edition of SA Weekender to help support the local communities.

== Personal life ==
After his retirement, Riddell and his wife sold their apartment at Holdfast Shores and relocated to Victor Harbor.
