= List of Australian television ratings for 1998 =

The following is a list of Australian television ratings for the year 1998.

== Network shares ==
Market	Network shares
Market	ABC	Seven	Nine	Ten	SBS
5 - Cities	14.4%	29.1%	32.6%	20.8%	3.1%
Sydney	15.4%	26.8%	33.1%	21.6%	3.1%
Melbourne	13.9%	28.7%	33.4%	21.0%	3.0%
Brisbane	14.5%	29.7%	32.9%	19.7%	3.2%
Adelaide	12.9%	32.3%	32.2%	19.7%	2.9%
Perth	14.7%	32.2%	28.6%	20.9%	3.6%

* Data Gathered by then Ratings Supplier: A.C Neilsen Australia

== Highest Rating Programs ==
RANK	PROGRAMME	NETWORK	AUDIENCE
1	1998 Commonwealth Games - Day 7 Primetime	9	3,145,000
2	1998 Commonwealth Games - Day 5 Primetime	9	2,785,000
3	1998 Commonwealth Games - Day 3 Primetime	9	2,600,000
4	1998 Commonwealth Games - Day 4 Primetime	9	2,535,000
5	Friends - New Episodes (1998 SEASON AVERAGE)	9	2,534,000
6	1998 AFL Grand Final	7	2,524,000
7	Merlin - Part One	9	2,490,000
8	1998 Commonwealth Games - Day 6 Primetime	9	2,453,000
9	Merlin - Part Two	9	2,411,000
10	Movie - Die Hard with a Vengeance	9	2,243,000
11	Blue Heelers (1998 SEASON AVERAGE)	7	2,239,000
12	Suddenly Susan (1998 SEASON AVERAGE)	9	2,188,000
13	60 Minutes - Special: 20 Years	9	2,130,000
14	1998 Commonwealth Games - Day 11 Primetime	9	2,114,000
15	The Day of the Roses - Part One	10	2,048,000
16	TV Week Logie Awards	9	2,046,000
17	This Is Your Life (1998 SEASON AVERAGE)	9	2,006,000
18	Water Rats (1998 SEASON AVERAGE)	9	1,998,000
19	The Day of the Roses - Part Two	10	1,988,000
20	1998 Commonwealth Games - Day 5 Primetime	9	1,988,000

== Top Rating Regular Programmes ==
RANK	PROGRAM	NETWORK	TIMESLOT	AUDIENCE
1	Friends - New Episodes	9	Monday 7.30 pm	2,543,000
2	Blue Heelers	7	Wednesday 8.30 pm	2,240,000
3	Suddenly Susan	9	Monday 8.00 pm	2,188,000
4	This Is Your Life	9	Thursday 8.30 pm	2,006,000
5	Water Rats	9	Tuesday 8.30 pm	1,998,000
6	Friends - Repeat Episodes	9	Monday 7.30 pm	1,918,000
7	Veronica's Closet	9	Tuesday 8.00 pm	1,916,000
8	Australia's Funniest Home Video Show	9	Tuesday 7.30 pm	1,848,000
9	Heartbeat	7	Monday 8.30 pm	1,830,000
10	National Nine News Sunday	9	Sunday 6.00 pm	1,828,000

== Weeknight News and Current Affair Readers 1998 ==
- List of Australian TV news presenters year by year#1990–1999

== See also ==
- Television ratings in Australia
