= Greg Pearce (news presenter) =

Australian journalist

Greg Pearce is an Australian journalist.

== Career ==
Originally a booth announcer with the ABC, Pearce became best known as presenter of the Ten News bulletin for Perth, prior to that he had been a short term news presenter for Seven News in Melbourne and had a short stint with Nine.

Originally produced locally in Perth, the 5pm news production was moved to Sydney as Network Ten claimed the upgrade of the Perth studios was too expensive at the time. Pearce continued to present Perth's news, from Sydney, with Christina Morrisey and later Celina Edmonds. He also often filled in for Sandra Sully on Ten Late News.

After 15 years as the presenter for Ten News Perth, Pearce cited family reasons and resigned from Ten to return full-time to Western Australia.

He worked with ABC Local Radio in South Western Australia, presenting ABC South West's Breakfast show. Pearce was offered the chance to return to Nine and present Nine News Perth with Dixie Marshall. He replaced Sonia Vinci who was to move to the new local version of A Current Affair but resigned for family reasons.
