= Belinda Heggen =

Australian journalist and news presenter

- Born: Adelaide, Australia
- Education: Star of the Sea Primary School; Woodlands Grammar School; University of Adelaide
- Occupations: News anchor of Ten News at Five, talkback radio presenter
- Years active: 2008–present
- Employer: 5AA
- Spouse: Simon Crabb
- Children: 2

Belinda Heggen is an Australian journalist and news presenter. She worked at ADS10 in Adelaide as a general assignment reporter, and also wrote occasional columns for the newspaper Messenger. She moved to Sydney in 2008 and was a finance reporter for Ten Early News, who filled in for Kathryn Robinson. She was also a Ten Late News reporter on Friday nights. She has also worked on Adelaide's radio station, FiveAA as a talk back host between 1pm and 4pm on weekdays.

== Ten News ==
In 2008, Heggen presented the Adelaide news alongside George Donikian while Rebecca Morse was on maternity leave. On 2 February 2012, she resigned from Network Ten after Network Ten's downsizing.

== FiveAA radio station ==
On 28 May 2012, Adelaide talk radio station 5AA announced Heggen as its new afternoon (1:00pm–4:00pm) host replacing Amanda Blair beginning 12 June. Heggen had previously filled in for Blair on a number of occasions.

== Personal life ==
Heggen is married with two sons. She is a Starlight Children's Foundation ambassador.

In December 2012, she was announced as the ambassador for the Women's and Children's Hospital Foundation in Adelaide.

== Controversy ==
On 15 February 2011, Heggen received global media attention for a comment made to Ten News presenter Mark Aiston. Aiston reported on the video of the Ashes urn, which featured English cricketer Andrew Strauss posing with the object. The footage went back to the newsroom after the report, showing Aiston telling Heggen "I just can't understand how something so small can be so impressive." Heggen replied, "Well, Mark, you would know about that."

Heggen later explained on Adelaide radio station Nova 91.9 that she and Aiston never had any romantic history and that it was a joke. "Those in Adelaide who know Mark Aiston know that he's a practical joker, and a prankster, and he's always cracking jokes and trying to catch us out. So I've always had in my mind a desire to try and catch him, um, and on air no less," she stated.
