= Georgina Lewis =

Australian journalist and news presenter

Georgina Lewis is an Australian journalist and news presenter.

== Career ==
As a student, Lewis studied at University of New England, and later at the University of Nebraska–Lincoln, one of the United States leading journalism schools. On returning to Australia she worked in regional Queensland in radio and later as a presenter for regional editions of Ten News.

She joined the 10 News First team in Brisbane as a reporter but soon became a regular stand by presenter. She has presented a number of different bulletins at Ten, including the national morning and weekend news, and Brisbane's summer edition news. She was appointed weather presenter in 2004. In 2007, Marie-Louise Theile announced she would leave 10 News First after over 15 years as Brisbane presenter; Lewis stepped into the role immediately after.

In November 2012, Network Ten appointed Lewis as the solo anchor of the Queensland edition of the revived Ten Eyewitness News, following the departure of Bill McDonald.

In August 2020, Lewis was made redundant by Network 10. She presented her final Brisbane-based 10 News First bulletin on 11 September, after which production of the state-based Queensland bulletin moved to Sydney.
