= Rodney Young =

Rodney Young may refer to:

- Rodney Young (archaeologist) (1907–1974), Near Eastern archaeologist
- Rodney Young (politician) (1910–1978), lawyer and Canadian Member of Parliament
- Rodney Young (American football) (born 1973), former American football defensive back

== See also ==
- Rod Young, presenter
