= Don Seccombe (television presenter) =

Australian television presenter

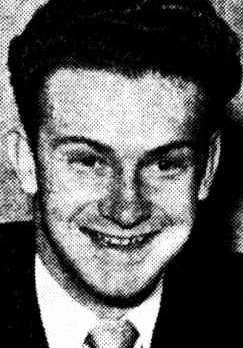
- Don Seccombe, 1954
- Born: 22 February 1931
- Died: 30 December 1993 (aged 62); Brisbane, Queensland
- Occupation: television presenter
- Years active: 1949 to present
- Known for: working at the Nine Network's Brisbane station, QTQ-9
- Television: Nine News, I've Got a Secret, A Flood of Memories

Donald Alexander Leslie Seccombe (22 February 1931 - 30 December 1993) was an Australian Logie Award-winning television presenter.

== Early life ==
He is best known for his association with QTQ-9 in Brisbane where he worked from 1962 to 1985. During this time, Seccombe anchored Nine News, hosted the game show I've Got a Secret and presented documentaries.

When he was paired with Melody Iliffe on Nine News in the 1960s, it's believed they formed the first male/female newsreading duo in Australia, which is still seen on many news bulletins throughout Australia.

Seccombe is often remembered for his coverage of the 1974 Brisbane flood. In one piece to camera at a flood damaged home, Seccombe was left on the verge of tears as he surveyed a private library of books which were destroyed by floodwaters.

With Frank Warrick, he co-hosted A Flood of Memories - a television special reflecting on the tenth anniversary of the floods in 1984.

Prior to joining QTQ-9, Seccombe worked in radio. Seccombe and his natural and relaxed style of delivery first came to attention in the late 1940s when he was a newsreader for the Queensland Radio News Service. He later hosted shows on 4BC in the 1950s including I Love Movies and the music quiz show Stop the Music.

In 1967, Seccombe won a Logie Award for Most Popular Male Personality (Queensland).

== Personal life ==
He retired in 1985.

== Death ==
Seccombe died on 30 December 1993 after he suffered a heart attack.
