= The World Around Us =

- Genre: Documentary
- Country of origin: Australia
- Original language: English
- No. of seasons: 28

Production
- Running time: 60 minutes

Original release
- Network: Seven Network
- Release: 1979 – 2006

The World Around Us is an Australian documentary television series that aired on the Seven Network between 1979 until 2006. It regularly showed documentaries which featured the likes of Malcolm Douglas and Sir David Attenborough.

== Presenters ==
The regular hosts included John Riddell, Ernie Dingo, Ann Sanders, Scott Lambert, Lisa McCune, Frank Warrick, Kay McGrath.
