= Michael Thomson (journalist) =

Australian news presenter and journalist (born 1960)

- Born: 23 August 1960 (age 66); Como, Western Australia
- Occupation: News presenter
- Years active: 1980–present
- Employer: Nine Network
- Television: Nine News
- Spouse: Yarni (m. 1984)
- Children: 3

Michael Thomson (born 23 August 1960) is an Australian news presenter and journalist. He is currently the presenter of Nine News Perth on weeknights at 6:00 pm and was formerly the presenter of the national late-night news bulletin on Mondays to Thursdays.

== Career ==
Thomson began his career working with newspaper Daily News in 1980.

In 1987, he joined the Nine Network's news program Nine News Perth as a crime reporter, then becoming a sports reporter and presenter.

He has covered the Commonwealth Games in Canada in 1994, the Olympic Games in Atlanta in 1996 and Olympic Games in Sydney in 2000.

In 2000, Thomson was awarded the Australian Sports Medal.

Thomson left the network in 2011 to become the Marketing and Communications Manager at Surf Life Saving WA, and returned in 2013 to become Head of Sport for STW9.

Thomson began presenting the flagship 6:00 pm Nine News Perth bulletin in January 2018, after Emmy Kubainski and Tim McMillan were axed at the end of 2017. Between 2020 and 2023, Thomson presented Nine News Late, which was introduced during the COVID-19 pandemic. He presented the bulletin on Mondays to Thursdays, with Peter Overton presenting the Sunday night bulletin from Sydney.

== Personal life ==
Thomson is married and has 3 sons.

He loves the outdoors, fishing and camping, seen by Perth viewers on screen, previously the host of Perth lifestyle show 'Just Add Water'.

Media offices
Preceded by Emmy Kubainski & Tim McMillan	Nine News Perth; Weeknight Presenter; January 2018 – present	Succeeded by Incumbent
Preceded by Peter Overton (from Sydney)	Nine News Late; Monday to Thursday Presenter; May 2020 – present	Succeeded by Incumbent
