= Rob Kelvin =

Australian former television news presenter

- Born: Adelaide, South Australia
- Occupation: Television presenter
- Years active: 1971–2011
- Spouse: Anna Kelvin (m. 1966)
- Children: 2

Rob Kelvin (born 1943 or 1944) is an Australian former television news presenter. He was a presenter of the weeknight edition of Nine News Adelaide produced by NWS-9. Kelvin presented the bulletin with Kevin Crease until February 2007, when Crease retired after being diagnosed with cancer. Kelvin presented with Kelly Nestor and then Michael Smyth until he retired in December 2010.

== Early life and education ==
Rob Kelvin was born in 1943 or 1944. He attended Woodville High School and studied economics at university.

He worked as a patrol officer in Papua New Guinea from 1964 to 1970 and returned to Australia in 1971, where he joined Lee Murray's Radio School in Melbourne.

== Career ==
Kelvin began broadcasting at 4AY in Townsville, in north Queensland, until a tropical cyclone blew away part of his house. He then moved to Swan Hill, Victoria to work at 3SH. After radio roles in Sale, Victoria, and Hobart, Tasmania, he returned to Adelaide's 5AD as a radio journalist.

In 1979, he joined NWS9, doing various presenting and reporting roles before becoming a newsreader in 1983. After being joined at the news desk by Kevin Crease in 1987, the pair enjoyed considerable ratings success, taking Nine News Adelaide to the top of the ratings in the 1990s.

Kelvin's sporting coverage included working on the Commonwealth Games in both Brisbane (1982) and Auckland (1990) and covering the Adelaide editions of the Australian Grand Prix on track from 1985 to 1995. A longtime motor-racing fan, Kelvin was also track commentator for more than 15 years at Rowley Park Speedway, and later at its replacement Speedway Park.

Kelvin presented his final regular bulletin on New Year's Eve 2010, ending his 32-year career with the Nine Network. He continued to appear as a stand-in presenter for 6pm news bulletins for Channel 9 in Adelaide during 2011.

== Personal life ==
Rob married Anna in 1966, and they had two sons, Richard and Jesse. Richard was kidnapped, tortured and murdered in 1983 when he was 15. Suspected serial killer Bevan Spencer von Einem, a leading suspect in Adelaide's unsolved Family Murders, which saw five young men abducted and killed between 1979 and 1983, was convicted of Richard's murder in November 1984 and was sentenced to life imprisonment.

Media offices
Preceded by Roger Cardwell	Nine News Adelaide; Weeknight presenter with Caroline Ainsle (1983–1987), Kevin Crease (1987–2007), Kelly Nestor (2007–2009), Michael Smyth (2009–2010); 1983 – 31 December 2010	Succeeded by Kate Collins
