= Max Futcher =

Australian television presenter and journalist

- Television: Brisbane edition of Seven News; WIN News
- Children: 2
- Awards: United Nations Peace Media Award

Max Futcher is an Australian television presenter and journalist.

He currently co-anchors the Brisbane edition of Seven News with each weeknight after being chosen to replace Bill McDonald in March 2018. Prior to joining Seven in 2014, Futcher had worked as a 10 News First reporter and relief newsreader for Network Ten, and as a WIN News reporter for WIN Television.

In 2006, Futcher won the United Nations Peace Media Award for his reporting in East Timor, and in 2016, won a Queensland Clarion Award (with camera operator Mark Michalek) for best television news report for their coverage of the Bali Nine executions.

Futcher is married with two children.

== See also ==
- Television in Australia
