= Jennifer Hansen =

Australian journalist and former news presenter

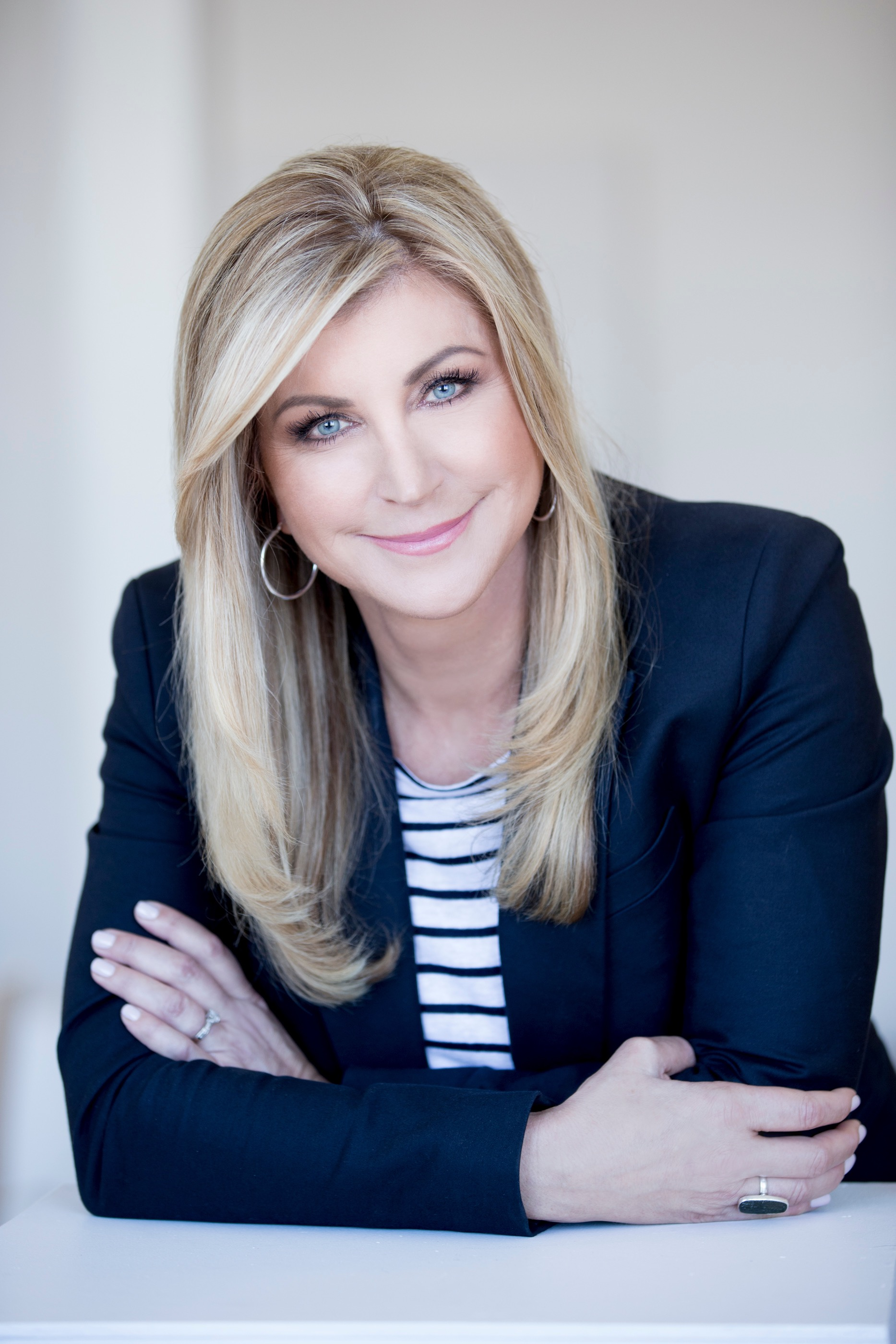
Jennifer Hansen in 2018

Jennifer Hansen is an Australian journalist and former news presenter on Network 10's Ten News in Melbourne. She presented the news at TEN alongside Mal Walden for more than 10 years - the pair becoming the longest serving news duo in Australia's history.

She was also a newsreader and co-host on The More Music Breakfast Show with Mike Perso on smoothfm 91.5 for nine years.

== Early life and education ==
Hansen was born in Orbost and raised in suburban Melbourne; the psychologist Margot Prior was her stepmother and she had seven siblings and half-siblings, including a sister who died in infancy. She attended Firbank Girls' Grammar School and graduated from the University of Melbourne with an Arts degree in English literature and criminology, and later studied professional writing and editing at RMIT University.

== Career ==
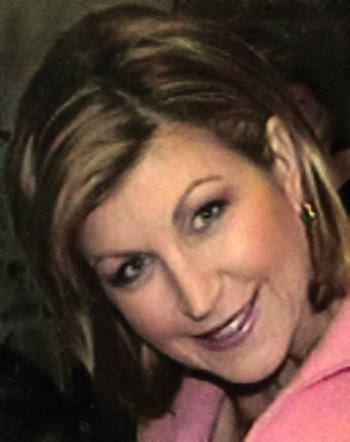
Hansen in 2003

While a student in the late 1980s, Hansen worked as a reporter at two newspapers, The Southern Cross and the Sunday Observer, and joined Network 10, where in 1995 she became a news presenter on Ten News. She co-hosted the Melbourne evening news broadcast with Mal Walden until leaving the network in January 2006.

Hansen subsequently worked as a news presenter for the ABC during the 2008 Summer Olympics, and wrote for the Herald Sun.

In March 2014, Hansen joined Mike Perso as a newsreader and co-host of The More Music Breakfast Show on smoothfm 91.5, In December 2022, Jennifer announced her resignation from smoothfm 91.5 after nine years with the station.

In 2019, Hansen became ambassador for Hope Street Youth and Family Services in Melton.

== Writing ==
Hansen's first novel, Making Headlines, was published in 2016.

== Personal life ==
Hansen is married to actor Alan Fletcher; they have a son and a daughter.
