= Dixie Marshall =

Australian journalist

- Born: Dixie Marshall; March 1963 (age 63)
- Occupations: Journalist, news presenter, director of communications, advertising
- Years active: 1984–present
- Spouse: Luke Morfesse
- Children: 2

Dixie Marshall (born March 1963) is a Western Australian former television news presenter and, from 2011 to 2017, was the media relations director, and then strategic communications director, for Colin Barnett, the Premier of Western Australia.

== Career ==
Marshall joined the Nine Network in Perth in 1984 as a cadet reporter. She became one of Australia's first female football commentators when she joined the Seven Network in Melbourne in the late 1980s. Returning to Perth in 1993, she left the sports department for general reporting, and progressed to become the Perth Nine News weeknight presenter alongside Peter Holland. In June 2003, Sonia Vinci replaced Holland to form Australia's first permanent all-female weekday evening news presenting team.

In 2011, she resigned from Nine News and, shortly after, joined the Western Australian Premier, Colin Barnett's office as the Director of Government Media. She moved to the role of strategic communications director in January 2015.

Marshall attracted considerable criticism following the spectacular defeat of the Barnett government in the March 2017 WA state election. The Australian reported that "Marshall was a controversial figure in Barnett's office. While not quite achieving Peta Credlin–level controversy, she was accused in parliament of being foul-mouthed and a bully."

In April 2017, former WA Police major crime boss, Inspector Jack Lee, while giving evidence in a multimillion-dollar defamation case being brought by barrister Lloyd Rayney, said Marshall had, during his investigation of Corryn Rayney's murder, attempted to pressure him, and threatened to report him to the Corruption and Crime Commission if he did not "pursue" Lloyd Rayney over the death of his wife.

Marshall led Dentsu Aegis Network content agency The Story Lab as its Head of Creative and Partnerships when it launched in Perth in April 2017. In 2018, Marshall joined the marketing firm Marketforce, leading its content creation division, Flare. Flare won a Perth Advertising and Design Club Award in 2019. In December 2020, Marshall was appointed Managing Director of Marketforce.

== Personal life ==
Marshall is the daughter of former footballer, tennis player, commentator and Liberal Party of Australia politician Arthur Marshall. She has two children with Luke Morfesse, a former journalist and current general manager of media and communications for the Fremantle Football Club.
