= Tamara Oudyn =

Australian television presenter and reporter

Tamara Oudyn is an Australian television presenter and reporter.

Oudyn currently presents ABC News Victoria from Sunday to Thursday.

== Career ==
Oudyn began her media career in 2003 working as a news reporter in Brisbane. Prior to this, she was a researcher and producer for factual programs in Australia and the United Kingdom. In late 2003, she moved to Melbourne and joined the ABC's Asia Pacific News service (now Australia Network), where she worked as a reporter and presenter of the breakfast news program for 18 months.

In 2005, Oudyn moved to the ABC News Victoria newsroom to report for the 7:00 pm news bulletin. Since then she has filmed in Banda Aceh six months after the Boxing Day tsunami, presented The Midday Report over two summers, spent 18 months on the court round in Melbourne, and filed network news reports.

In February 2008, Oudyn replaced Kathy Bowlen as the weekend presenter of ABC News Victoria. In January 2009, she was appointed as host of Stateline Victoria, replacing Kathy Bowlen who resigned from the network. She has been a fill-in presenter on News Breakfast.

On 5 October 2018, it was announced that Oudyn would become the Sunday to Thursday presenter of ABC News Victoria after the retirement of Ian Henderson.

== Personal life ==
Tamara is divorced and has two sons.

Preceded by Ian Henderson	ABC News Victoria; Sunday to Thursday presenter October 2018 – present	Succeeded by Incumbent
Preceded by Kathy Bowlen	ABC News Victoria; Weekend presenter February 2008 – October 2018	Succeeded by Mary Gearin
Preceded by Kathy Bowlen	Stateline Victoria; Presenter; February 2009 – September 2009	Succeeded by Josephine Cafagna
