= David Curnow =

Australian television and radio presenter

David Curnow is an Australian television and radio presenter. Curnow is best known for anchoring ABC News Queensland, the Queensland edition of ABC Television's flagship 7 p.m. news bulletin.

== Personal life ==
Curnow was born in Stanthorpe and grew up in Toowoomba. He commenced working for the ABC in 1998, working as a reporter in Adelaide, Broken Hill and Port Pirie before becoming weekend anchor of ABC News Queensland in 2007.

Curnow anchored the bulletin from 2009 until 2013, when he was replaced by Karina Carvalho.

After he was replaced by Carvalho, Curnow commenced hosting the statewide Evenings radio program on ABC Radio Brisbane. In 2017, the ABC announced Curnow would be taking leave "for the foreseeable future".

Curnow has also hosted the ABC's local Brisbane Anzac Day telecast.
