= Mark Soderstrom =

Personal information
- Full name: Mark Warren Kenneth Soderstrom
- Born: 15 September 1970 (age 56)

Playing career
Years	Club	Games (Goals)
1997–2000	Sturt	65 (4)
1996	Glenelg	16 (13)
1992–1995	North Adelaide	44 (17)
Total		125

Mark Soderstrom (born September 15, 1970) is an Adelaide television presenter on SAS Seven and former footballer. He hosted the 2017 Carols by Candlelight, and is a regular sports reporter on Seven News and Australian Rules football reporter on Seven Sport. He is now a breakfast presenter on SAFM radio as part of Bec and Soda with Rebecca Morse. Previously with MiX FM.

Prior to his radio and television career, Soderstrom played 125 SANFL games with Sturt, Glenelg and North Adelaide.

Soderstrom has three children. He is also a former physical education and psychology teacher.
