= Juanita Phillips =

Australian journalist and news presenter

- Phillips presenting ABC News NSW in 2010
- Born: 11 October 1963 (age 63); Brisbane, Queensland, Australia
- Occupations: Journalist and news presenter and reporter
- Years active: 1982–2023
- Known for: ABC News NSW as weeknight presenter 2003–2023
- Notable work: The Courier-Mail 1982–? as cadet journalist, writer and columnist; Reporter and presenter at TVQ-10 – early 1990s; Ten Eyewitness News presenter of weekend bulletin; Ten News First at Five (co-anchor with Ron Wilson; Sky News Australia as Presenter; BBC World News as News Presenter; CNN International as co-anchor

Juanita Phillips (born 11 October 1963) is an Australian former journalist and news presenter and reporter. Phillips was previously the weeknight presenter of ABC News NSW in Sydney.

== Early life ==
Phillips was born in Brisbane, Queensland where she began her career in 1982 as a cadet newspaper journalist at The Courier-Mail where she became a feature writer and columnist.

== Television work ==
In the early 1990s, Phillips worked at Ten Network station TVQ-10 in Brisbane as a reporter and presenter, before making her national debut as regular presenter on Ten Eyewitness News weekend late edition (from Network Ten's Brisbane studios) in 1993.

A year later, Phillips moved to Sydney to join Ron Wilson on Ten Network Ten News First at Five, succeeding Sandra Sully and was lead female presenter for the bulletin for two years before being succeeded by Jessica Rowe.

In 1997, following a stint as presenter with Sky News Australia, Phillips moved to London where she worked as a news presenter at BBC World News while at the same time running a London café. She later moved to CNN International, also in London, working mainly as co-anchor on CNN Today before returning to Australia as weekend presenter of ABC News in New South Wales.

== ABC News ==
In 2003, she moved to co-anchor ABC News NSW with Tony Eastley and later become solo presenter of the bulletin.

During 2007, Phillips wrote a number of articles for The Bulletin including an article on animal rights activist Lyn White that caused some controversy.

On 30 November 2007, Phillips suffered an on-air coughing fit while presenting ABC News NSW, forcing the ABC to switch to a simulcast of the Victoria state bulletin from its Melbourne station until her coughing fit subsided. In her 2010 book, A Pressure Cooker Saved My Life, she describes the episode as a result of a stress-induced laryngeal spasm.

On 19 November 2013, The Australian published the ABC's top salaries; Phillips' salary at the time was $316,000.

In July 2023, Philips announced her resignation from the ABC after 21 years and 4,500 bulletins. Her final bulletin was on Sunday 10 September. Jeremy Fernandez has been announced as her replacement.

== Personal life ==
In 2002, Phillips married Mario Milostic, an Australian graphic designer, after a six-week courtship. Their first child was born in 2003 and their daughter in 2006. In 2009, Phillips took carer's leave from the ABC to care for their children while her husband was interstate for rehabilitation from bowel cancer. They separated in 2010.

In 2012, Phillips began a relationship with the federal minister for climate change, Greg Combet. In 2013, the relationship attracted some controversy for a first-class overseas trip paid from government funds. In May 2013, Phillips was removed from one evening's ABC News bulletin due to a conflict of interest which arose after Combet faced an ICAC inquiry into government corruption.

== Publications ==
- The Newspaper Kids, series of five children's books, 1996, 1997, HarperCollins
- A Pressure Cooker Saved My Life: how to have it all, do it all, and keep it all together, 2010, ABC Books, ISBN 978-0-7333-2588-5
