= Rebecca Morse (journalist) =

Australian journalist and presenter

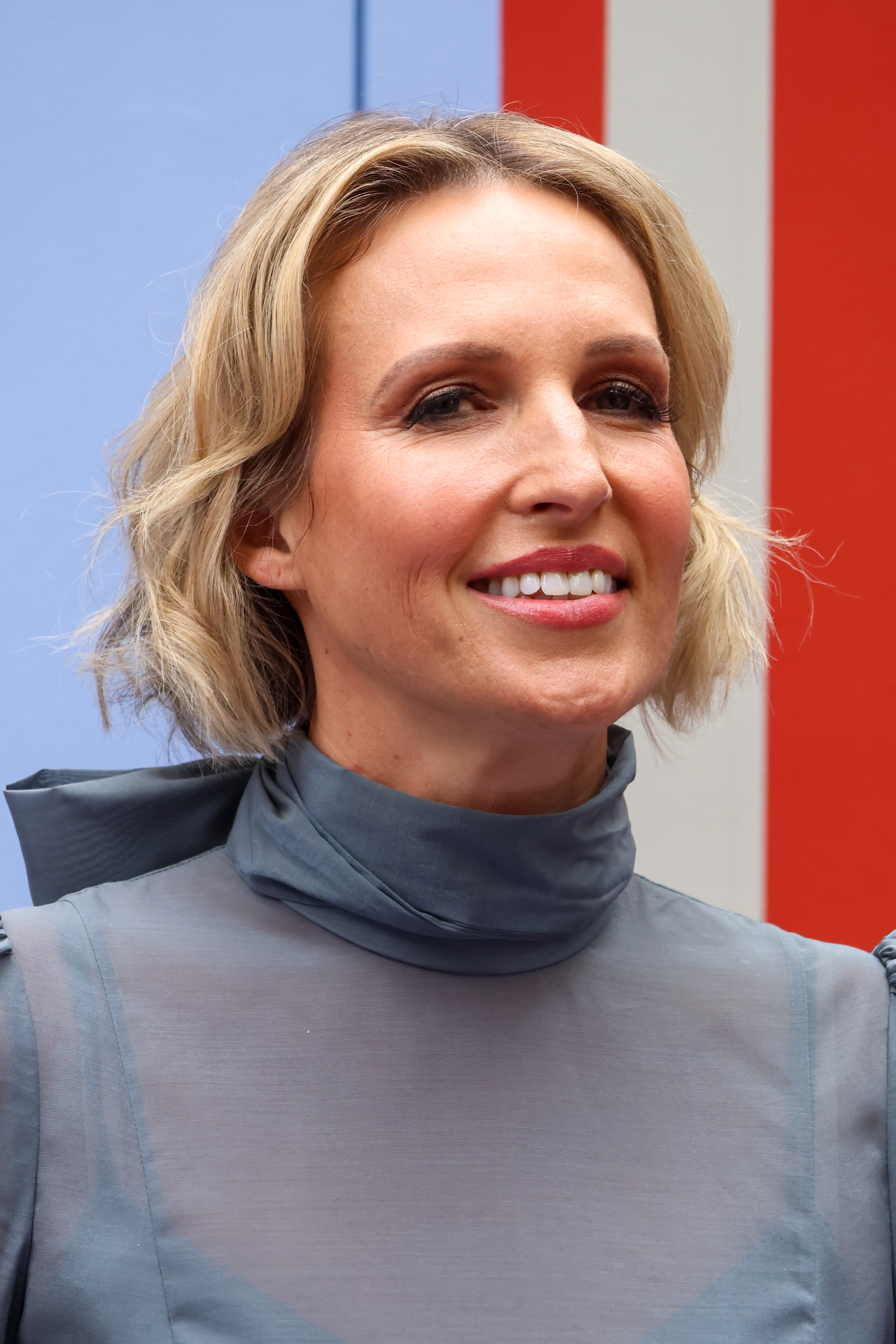
- Morse in 2026
- Born: 26 August 1976 (age 50); Adelaide, Australia
- Occupation: Radio presenter
- Spouse: James Wakelin
- Children: 3

Rebecca Jane Morse (born 26 August 1976, in South Australia) is an Australian journalist, news and radio presenter.

Morse was a presenter of Adelaide's 10 News First between 2006 and 2020. She was also a co-host on SAFM's breakfast radio show Bec & Soda in Adelaide with Mark Soderstrom between 2023 and 2024.

== Career ==
Morse attended Blackwood High School and the University of South Australia at Magill. Prior to joining Ten she worked for the ABC in Adelaide as a reporter and presenter. She was a finalist in the Walkley Awards in 2004 in the category of Television News Reporting and in 2005 won the gold award for Journalist of the Year at the South Australian Media Awards.

Morse replaced Kelly Nestor in March 2006.

In 2012, Morse hosted "The Newsfeed" with Ryan "Burgo" Burgess on SAFM.

In August 2020, Morse was made redundant by Network 10. She presented her final Adelaide-based 10 News First bulletin on 11 September before production of the state-based Adelaide bulletin moved back to Melbourne.

== Personal life ==
She is married to Nine News reporter James "Jimmy" Wakelin; they have three daughters.
