= Keith Martyn =

Australian journalist

Keith Martyn is a former radio and television news presenter who was the weekday weather presenter for South Australian television for 27 years. He is also known for 23 years of Keith Martyn's South Australian Almanac ISBN 1-921008-63-6. Martyn was with Nine News Adelaide between 1996 and 2007, and with Channel Seven for 16 years before that. He also co-presented breakfast shifts on 5DN and 5AD with Jeff Sunderland.

In 2007 Martyn retired to Victoria to be closer to his daughter.
