= Tony Eastley =

Australian journalist, host and presenter

Tony Eastley (born 1955) is an Australian newspaper journalist and radio and television newsreader and host.

== Journalism career ==
Eastley began his journalism career in the 1970s with The Examiner newspaper in Launceston, Tasmania before joining the Australian Broadcasting Corporation in 1979.

With the ABC he spent stints in Singapore and Hong Kong as a foreign correspondent.

After returning to Australia he presented ABC TV's breakfast news, hosting First Edition from 1993 to 1995.

From 2002 to 2003 he was the newsreader of the NSW ABC-TV 7pm news, having taken over from long-standing newsreader Richard Morecroft.

In 2004, Eastley took on the role of presenter for AM, the local radio news and current affairs program.

In January 2014, Eastley resigned from AM to become senior presenter on ABC News 24. Chris Uhlmann was announced as his replacement.

In June 2016, Eastley retired from the Australian Broadcasting Corporation after 37 years.

== Personal life ==
Eastley is married and has two children.

Media offices
Preceded by Richard Morecroft	ABC News NSW; Presenter; 2002–2003	Succeeded by Juanita Phillips
Preceded by Kim Landers	ABC News Afternoons; Presenter; 2014–2015	Succeeded by Kumi Taguchi
