= Roger Cardwell =

Australian television and radio personality

Roger Arthur Cardwell (c. 1932 – 25 October 2017) was a South Australian television and radio personality.

== History ==
Nothing has been found of Cardwell's origin, but before his television career he was known as an actor and musician, a regular on Adelaide's "Flinders Street Revue". He acted in schools broadcasts for ABC radio. As a folk singer and guitarist he played Adelaide's coffee lounge scene and Adelaide Tonight. And when Channel Ten opened as Adelaide's fourth TV station, Cardwell was their first newsreader.

Cardwell was perhaps best known as compere and presenter of the TV shows Country and Western Hour for Channel Nine and Country Style for Channel Seven in the 1960s. Country Style, "one of the friendliest shows on Australian television", made television history as the first Australian show to be recorded in colour, on 13 November 1968. Philips imported the PAL equipment for demonstration purposes, and first used it at the Royal Melbourne Show before bringing it to Adelaide. The experiment gave valuable experience to the production crew, who had to rethink makeup, backgrounds and choice of clothes, which had previously been optimised for black-and-white.

He toured live shows featuring favourite performers to country areas and in 1996 was inducted into the Australian Country Music Hall of Fame in 1996 for his pioneering work.

He was a newsreader for 5AD-FM and 5DN from 1985 to 1998, after which he was active as a voiceover man for radio and TV commercials.

Cardwell survived two heart attacks and sometime around 2012 moved into Resthaven Malvern nursing home, where he died from lung cancer.

== Personal ==
Cardwell married five times. His son Jeb Cardwell and his daughter Abbie, both from an earlier marriage to Wendy are talented musicians.
