= Rosanna Mangiarelli =

Australian television presenter

- Born: 1974 (age 50–51)
- Occupation(s): journalist and television presenter
- Known for: hosting news and current affairs programs
- Television: Today Tonight, Seven News, Finding the Beaumonts, Carols by Candlelight

Rosanna Mangiarelli (born 1974) is an Australian television presenter.

She is best known for anchoring Seven News bulletins on Channel 7 in Adelaide and for hosting the South Australian edition of Today Tonight for 12 years.

In December 2022, it was announced that Mangiarelli and Will Goodings would succeed Jane Doyle following her retirement to anchor Adelaide's weeknight Seven News bulletins in 2023.

== Career ==
=== Early career ===
After completing a journalism degree at the University of South Australia, she joined Central GTS/BKN in Port Pirie in 1997.

In 1999, Mangiarelli joined the Australian Broadcasting Corporation. She worked for the ABC in Tasmania, South Australia and Western Australia.

In 2001, she anchored the ABC's Australia Television bulletins from Perth which were broadcast into the Asia-Pacific region.

=== Channel 7 ===
Mangiarelli joined the Seven Network in 2004.

Following the departure of Leigh McClusky as host of the South Australian edition of Today Tonight, Mangiarelli was appointed as her replacement.

Mangiarelli continued to host Today Tonight for 12 years until it was axed in 2019.

In 2017, Mangiarelli was announced as the anchor of a new afternoon Seven News bulletin on Channel 7 which launched at 4pm on 31 July 2017.

After Today Tonight was axed in 2019, Mangiarelli continued her role on the afternoon bulletin until that too was axed in 2020 and replaced with a bulletin from Melbourne.

Following the axing of the afternoon bulletin, Mangiarelli moved to reading the weekend evening Seven News bulletins, replacing Jessica Adamson.

In February 2021, Mangiarelli was paired up with Mike Smithson on the weekend bulletins as well as a new local 11:30am Seven News bulletin on weekdays.

In September 2022, Mangiarelli was teamed up with former 10 News First sports presenter Will Goodings to read the weekend bulletins.

Following the retirement of long-serving Seven News presenter Jane Doyle, it was announced Mangiarelli and Goodings would replace Doyle as weeknight presenters of Seven News in 2023. On their first night together, 7NEWS Adelaide recorded more than double the ratings of rival Nine News Adelaide, with 132,000 viewers to the latter's 61,000.

Apart from her roles with Seven News and Today Tonight, Mangiarelli has also been a part of the annual Carols by Candlelight telecasts and contributed to South Australian state election coverage.

In 2016, she hosted a television special titled Finding the Beaumonts, which covered the 50th anniversary of the Beaumont children's disappearance in 1966.

== Personal life ==
In 2021, Mangiarelli was living in Walkerville.

Mangiarelli is married to a television production coordinator who was working as a camera operator at Central GTS/BKN in Port Pirie when they first met. The couple celebrated their 20th anniversary in 2022. They have three children.
