= Ian Henderson (news presenter) =

Australian television news presenter

- Born: 15 August 1953 (age 73); Melbourne, Victoria Australia
- Occupations: Television news presenter and journalist (until 2018)

Ian Henderson (born 15 August 1953) is a retired Australian television news presenter and journalist.

Henderson was the weeknight presenter of ABC News Victoria in Melbourne and ABC News at Five.

== Life and career ==
Henderson graduated from Haileybury College, Melbourne, in 1970. He joined the ABC in 1980 after completing a cadetship with the Leader Associated Newspapers - the network of News Limited local newspapers in Victoria and worked as a state political and industrial reporter, as well as being an ABC correspondent for Europe in the early 1990s. Over his career he also hosted the ABC's state election coverage and presented the weekly current affairs program Stateline.

Henderson was the main newsreader of the ABC News Victoria 7 pm bulletin for 26 years, taking over from Mary Delahunty in 1992.

Henderson has also hosted many other special presentations, such as the ABC's ANZAC Day coverage and the Melbourne Press Club's "Quill Awards".

In February 2009, Henderson presented ABC News live from various locations affected by the Black Saturday Victorian bushfires. He also hosted the national memorial service for bushfire victims, Together for Victoria, which was seen around Australia and the world.

On 2 October 2018, Henderson announced his retirement from the ABC, which was effective on 11 October 2018. A technical glitch during the program, however, prevented the rest of what would have been his final ABC News bulletin from going to air. He eventually presented his final bulletin on 12 October 2018. Tamara Oudyn was announced as his replacement.

== Personal life ==
Henderson was formerly a committee member of the Melbourne Press Club. He is a supporter of the Melbourne Football Club in the Australian Football League. He plays golf in his spare time.

Media offices
Preceded by Sue McIntosh	ABC News Victoria; Weeknight presenter 1992–2018	Succeeded by Tamara Oudyn
Preceded by James McHale	ABC News at Five; Presenter; January 2018 – October 2018	Succeeded by Tamara Oudyn
