= James McHale =

Australian journalist and news presenter

James McHale is an Australian journalist and news presenter.

== Career ==
McHale graduated from Murdoch University in 2006 with a Bachelor of Laws/Media, majoring in Radio. After completing his degree, he worked at Clayton Utz in 2007 and 2008.

In February 2009, McHale joined the Australian Broadcasting Corporation, where he worked as a reporter.

In December 2011, McHale replaced Karina Carvalho as presenter of the weekday bulletin of ABC News WA with Carvalho temporarily replacing Virginia Trioli whilst Trioli was on maternity leave on ABC News Breakfast.

In February 2013, McHale began presenting the national ABC News at Five bulletin on ABC TV.

McHale's last day at the ABC was 11 September 2020.

Media offices
Preceded by Karina Carvalho	ABC News WA; Presenter; December 2011 – September 2020	Succeeded by Pamela Medlen (Mondays to Thursdays); Charlotte Hamlyn (Fridays to Sundays)
Preceded by New bulletin	ABC News at Five; Presenter; February 2013 – December 2017	Succeeded by Ian Henderson
