= Pamela Medlen =

Australian journalist

Pamela Medlen is a Western Australian journalist, reporter, and news presenter. Since September 2020, she has presented ABC News on Monday-Thursday evenings.

Medlen grew up on her family's farm in the Great Southern region of Western Australia, before moving to Perth to study journalism at Curtin University. While studying, she worked at Curtin Radio.

After completing her degree Medlen travelled overseas, working in London and moving around Europe for a year and a half. She returned to Perth and worked for suburban newspapers. She won a WA Youth Award for reporting, and was awarded as Community Newspaper Group's best journalist.

In 2006, Medlen began working at the Australian Broadcasting Corporation; she has been a reporter and producer, as well as reading the weekend news bulletins, before replacing James McHale in September 2020 as the presenter of the flagship weekday evening news.

Medlen was a master of ceremonies for TEDx Perth in 2012.

== Personal life ==
Medlen lives in Bayswater with her long-term partner and their two dogs.
