= Jenny Woodward =

Australian journalist

Jenny Woodward OAM
- Born: Brisbane, Queensland, Australia
- Education: Darling Downs Institute of Advanced Education
- Occupation: television presenter
- Years active: 1975–present
- Known for: being Australia's longest serving weather presenter
- Television: ABC News Queensland, The Weather Quarter

Jennifer Woodward is an Australian television presenter.

Woodward is Australia's longest serving weather presenter, having delivered the forecasts on the weeknight edition of ABC News Queensland since 1986.

== Early life ==
Woodward was born in Brisbane but grew up in Toowoomba, Queensland where she studied drama at the Darling Downs Institute of Advanced Education, which later became the University of Southern Queensland.

== Career ==
Woodward began her television career at Toowoomba's DDQ-10 in 1975 where she produced and directed children's programs, variety shows and special event as well as being a newsreader and weather presenter.

In the early 1980s, Woodward was a producer at Channel 7 in Brisbane where she was an assistant producer on the children's program Wombat. This led to her co-authoring The Wombat Book in 1984.

In 1986, Woodward joined ABC Television in Brisbane where she became the weeknight weather presenter on the station's flagship 7 p.m. news bulletin.

Woodward also conducts frequent live broadcasts, including annual broadcasts from the Royal Queensland Show (colloquially 'Ekka'). She has been the compere of the nationally televised "Spirit of Christmas" concert series at the Queensland Performing Arts Centre for seven years.

From 2011 until 2014, Woodward hosted The Weather Quarter on ABC News 24.

In 2010, Woodward was approached by the Australian Labor Party to run as a candidate in the 2010 Australian Federal Election, but declined to change professions.

Woodward was off the air for six weeks in mid-2020 when she was hospitalised with an inflamed heart following a virus.

In 2021, Woodward starred in her own one-woman stage show called Weathering Well which premiered at the Brisbane Powerhouse on 24 April 2021.

For 20 years, Woodward has been as a volunteer with Meals on Wheels.

== Personal life ==
Woodward is one of six daughters of Bob and Laurie Mackie. She and her husband Doug, who have three sons, live in Brisbane.

== Awards ==
In 2004, Woodward won a Queensland Media Award.

She was further honoured on 8 April 2008 when a species of geranium was named after her. The Jenny Woodward Geranium is a pink flowered bush.

Woodward was awarded a Medal of the Order of Australia in the 2024 Australia Day Honours in recognition of her service to broadcast media.
