= Graeme Goodings =

Australian journalist

- Born: 21 June 1948 (age 77); Australia
- Occupations: Television and radio presenter

Graeme Goodings (born 21 June 1948) is an Australian television and radio presenter.

== Early career ==
Goodings's break in media came in 1963 when, after working as a panel operator at Melbourne radio station 3AW, he went on air Christmas Morning to fill-in for the sick presenter. He later worked for 7LA in Launceston and 5DN in Adelaide before leaving the media to operate a health food business in Tasmania.

However, he returned to television as a reporter for TNT-9 (now Southern Cross Television) in northern Tasmania. His work on The Saturday Night Show earned him a Logie Award.

== Seven Network ==
In 1981, Goodings joined SAS-10 Adelaide, now SAS-7 as a sports reporter and presenter for Eyewitness News. In 1983 he became news presenter and remained in that role for over 20 years, even after SAS swapped its affiliation from the Ten Network to the Seven Network.

Goodings was joined at the news desk by Jane Doyle in 1989 and by 2000 Seven News would become the number-one rating bulletin in Adelaide, overtaking the rival Nine News. After sick leave in 2004, Goodings swapped with John Riddell to present Seven News on weekends. The weekend bulletin previously presented by John Riddell was consistently beaten for many years by National Nine News Adelaide, then hosted by Georgina McGuiness. However, since Goodings took over weekends the ratings steadily climbed to be the number one weekend news bulletin in Adelaide.

In November 2014, Goodings contract was not renewed by the Seven Network after 34 years with the network.

He also is occasionally heard on local radio station FIVEaa.

== After commercial television ==
After leaving commercial television Goodings has still been active in the media. He hosts a web video show called "Snapshot with Graeme Goodings" about local people and places in South Australia. He currently operates a video production company (The Video Professionals) with Cinematographer, David Hales making videos for SMEs and community.

In 2023 he returned to radio as the news reader for FIVEAA Breakfast while still doing other roles with the station hosting weekend and shows over the summer period.

As of late 2024 he became the host of FIVEAA Mornings taking over from Matthew Pantelis who returned to the role as news reader.

== Personal life ==
Goodings is married to Eve and they have three children. His son Will Goodings (born 1983) currently also works in the media at 5AA, and later followed in his father's footsteps presenting the weekend news on Seven News Adelaide; he was promoted to weeknights in January 2023 when he and Rosanna Mangiarelli replaced retiring newsreader Jane Doyle. He hosts Rural Live TV and reads the sport on KG and the General with episodes live and podcast on www.australialivetv.com.

In 2004 Goodings announced that he was battling bowel cancer. He took several months off from his duties at Seven News but returned to present the weekend news in 2005.

He regularly gives talks to cancer support groups, is a board member of ProstateSA and constantly promotes the need for men to take charge of their health.

A passionate fan of the Adelaide Crows AFL team, he has been a club Ambassador since 1991, and for the teams dual premierships in 1997/1998 broadcast Seven News Live from Melbourne.

He is also the No.1 Member of the Crows Supporters Group.

On Sunday 19 July 2015, Goodings was involved in a controversial incident at the end of Showdown 39 between The Adelaide Crows and Port Adelaide Football Clubs, the first showdown following the death on 3 July 2015 of former Port Adelaide Assistant Coach, Port Adelaide Football Club Life Member and coach of the Adelaide Football Club, Phil Walsh.

Goodings caused offence to many Port Adelaide and neutral supporters by posting on his Facebook page comments describing Port fans who jeered at the end of the derby as “pretty pathetic” and “an embarrassment to your club". The comments led Port Adelaide Football Club Chief Executive, Keith Thomas to send an email to all Port Adelaide members on 22 July criticising Goodings' comments and reflecting on the true meaning of the showdown following Walsh's death.
