= Rod Young =

Australian journalist and news presenter

- Born: 1951 (age 74–75)
- Occupations: Journalist and TV news presenter
- Employer: Retired

Rod Young (born 1951) is a retired Australian journalist and news presenter, with a career spanning 45 years.

Young previously presented Seven News Brisbane with Kay McGrath on weekends between 2013 and 2016, and on weeknights between 2002 and 2012, during which, after years of steady progress, the bulletin overtook the rival Nine News Queensland as the top-rating news service in Brisbane. Between 2016 and 2021, he presented Seven News Gold Coast on Mondays to Thursdays.

== Career ==
Before moving to the Seven Network, Young was the face of news in Brisbane on the ABC where he began working in the late 1970s. Young has had a distinguished career after starting in radio at station 2GO at Gosford on the New South Wales Central Coast. Young was appointed the weeknight newsreader on the ABC in 1985.

In October 2002 he moved to Seven News to present beside Kay McGrath, after long serving news presenter Frank Warrick retired.

In June 2016, after presenting with Kay McGrath for 14 years on weekdays for ten years and weekends for four, Rod Young announced he would be stepping down from the Brisbane bulletin to present Seven News' new local Gold Coast bulletin from Surfers Paradise. He presented the bulletin on Mondays to Thursdays, alongside Amanda Abate.

In July 2021, Young announced his retirement from reading television news. He presented his final Seven Gold Coast News bulletin on 22 July.
