= Kay McGrath =

Australian journalist

Kathrine Mary McGrath is an Australian former journalist, most notably being the former weekend presenter on Seven News Brisbane. She formerly presented the bulletin with Rod Young on weekends between 2013 and 2016, and on weeknights between 2002 and 2012, during which, after years of steady progress, the bulletin overtook the rival Nine News Queensland as the top-rating news service in Brisbane.

== Career ==
McGrath was formerly a newsreader at TVQ-0 and presented a national breakfast news/finance show called TVAM on the Seven Network in 1988 from Sydney and the following year Kay joined the Seven News Brisbane team in 1989, has had a distinguished career by reporting on the Fitzgerald Inquiry, as well as the Brisbane airport hijacking, and reporting on-location after Cyclone Larry hit Innisfail, and on the Sunshine Coast in the aftermath of Steve Irwin's death.

During her time with Seven, she co-hosted with Frank Warrick for 13 years. She has reported for and co-hosted a series of documentaries on local social issues, including the acclaimed special, "Behind Closed Doors: Child Abuse in Queensland".

In January 2013, McGrath and Young were demoted to Friday and Saturday anchors of Seven News Brisbane, after more than 10 years on weeknights, with Sharyn Ghidella and Bill McDonald taking over Sunday to Thursday nights.

She was awarded a Medal of the Order of Australia in the 2017 Australia Day Honours for service to the broadcast media.

In December 2019, McGrath announced that she would step down from the Seven News desk; her final bulletin was on 26 January 2020. She was replaced by Katrina Blowers.

== Personal life ==
McGrath is committed to a number of community issues. A campaigner against child abuse, she is patron of the organisation, Protect All Children Today (PACT), and an ambassador for Act for Kids. For a number of years McGrath has also chaired the committee that organises Child Protection Week activities in Queensland during September. She is also committed to the fight against breast cancer, and is a vice patron of the Breast Cancer Association of Queensland.

McGrath has two sons.
