= Kate Collins (journalist) =

Australian journalist (born 1983)

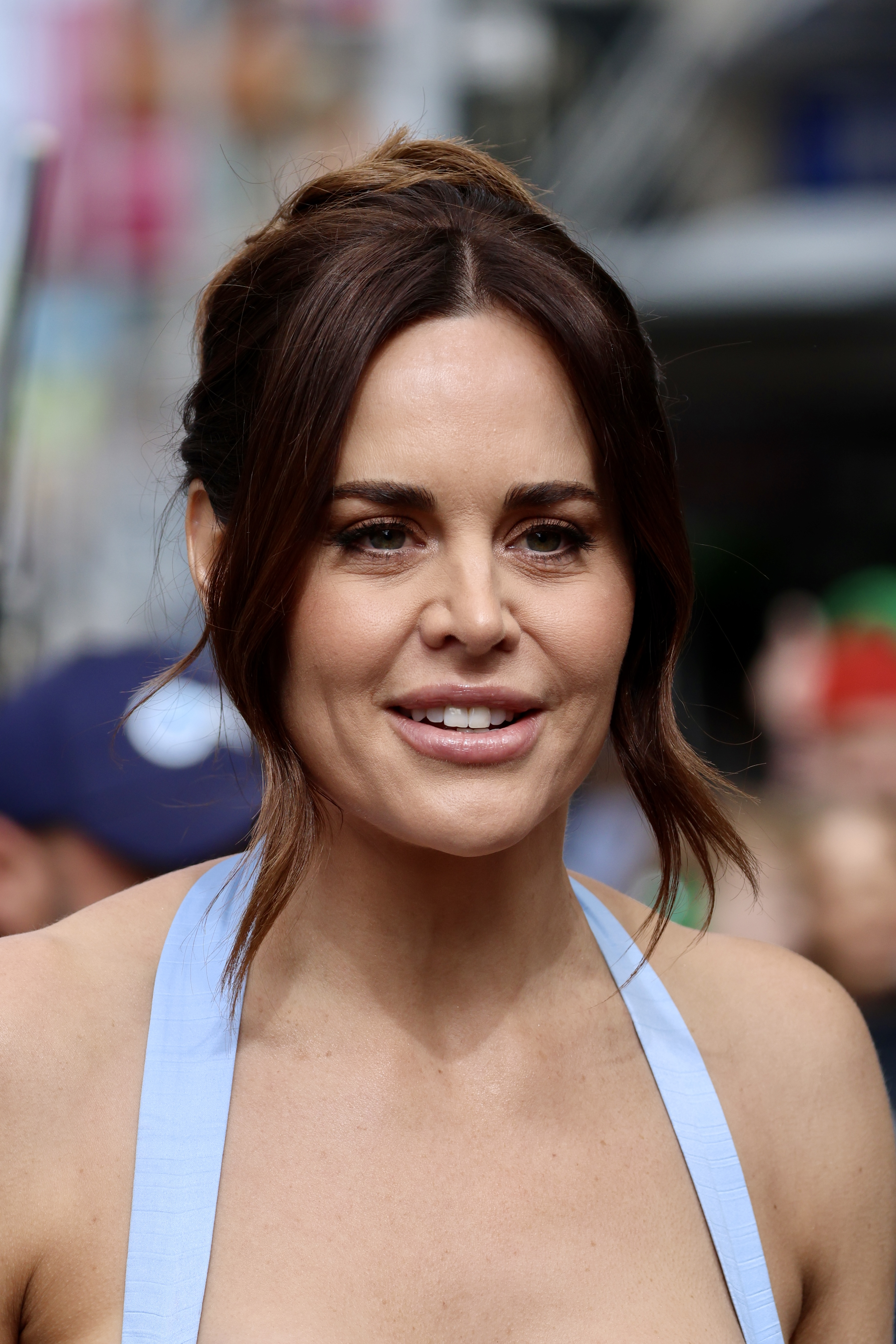
- Collins at the 2025 Adelaide Christmas Pageant
- Born: 6 April 1983 (age 43); Mount Gambier, South Australia
- Education: Norwood Morialta High School; University of Adelaide; University of South Australia
- Occupation: News presenter
- Years active: 2006–pres
- Employer: FiveAA
- Children: 2

Kate Collins (born 6 April 1983 in Mount Gambier, South Australia) is an Australian former journalist.

Collins previously co‑presented Nine News Adelaide with Brenton Ragless.

== Career ==
Collins attended Norwood Morialta High School, before studying at the University of Adelaide and the University of South Australia. She also worked as a weekend newsreader for Austereo Radio. Her presenting career began with training at C31 Adelaide.

In 2006, she joined NWS 9 in Adelaide as a general reporter for Nine News. The following year, she began serving as a weekend fill‑in news presenter, and in 2011 she succeeded Rob Kelvin as a main presenter.

Collins later hosted the Adelaide edition of A Current Affair until the program was discontinued.

On 10 November 2025, she was made redundant from the Nine Network after 19 years with the company.

In January 2026, Collins joined FiveAA as the breakfast newsreader on Breakfast with David Penberthy and Will Goodings.

Media offices
| Preceded by Rob Kelvin | Nine News Adelaide; Weeknight presenter 2011–2025 | Succeeded by Brenton Ragless |
| Preceded by Georgina McGuinness (2002) | A Current Affair presenter 2008–2009 | Succeeded by Axed |
