= Sonia Vinci =

Australian journalist

Sonia Vinci (born 1971) is a former journalist and co-anchor of Nine News in Perth.

She began a journalist in 1990 at Perth radio 6PR and later became Australia's youngest female news director. During her time at 6PR, Sonia also worked at Channel Seven Perth as a weekend journalist for Seven News, and also read sports news for Seven's Footy Show in 1994.

She later worked for regional station GWN as a news anchor before returning to 6PR and the Channel 9 in 2000. She worked initially as a stand-by news anchor, but later became weeknight anchor, and with Dixie Marshall was part of Australia's first female duo news team from 2003 to 2007.

In January 2008, Nine announced that Vinci would host a new Western Australian version of A Current Affair. However, it was announced in July that Vinci would not proceed with her new position, with a view to "spending more time with the kids".
