= Tracey Curro =

Australian journalist (born 1963)

- Born: Tracey Ilana Curro; 27 November 1963 (age 62); Ingham, Queensland, Australia
- Education: Queensland University of Technology
- Occupation: Television journalist

Tracey Ilana Curro (born 27 November 1963) is an Australian journalist.

Curro has previously been a news presenter on GMV-6, QTQ-9 and ATV-10 and a reporter on the Seven Network's Beyond 2000, a science-technology show, and correspondent on 60 Minutes.

== Career ==
Curro was born and grew up in Ingham, Queensland; her father, Phillip, was a descendant of first-generation immigrants from Sicily. She is a graduate of the Queensland University of Technology (Bachelor of Business – Communications) and the Institute of Strategic Leadership, New Zealand.

She was embroiled in a court case when she broke her contract with the producers of Beyond 2000 to join 60 Minutes: Curro v Beyond Productions Pty Ltd (1993) 30 NSWLR 337, decided 7 May 1993.

She can occasionally be heard filling in for regular presenters on 774 ABC Melbourne radio, notably filling in for a two-week period in 2005 following the departure of Virginia Trioli, and has written for The Australian Women's Weekly.

One of her prized moments of television occurred when she asked Pauline Hanson whether she was xenophobic. The famous response, "Please explain", has now become an Australia classic, and is a line for which Hanson is remembered.

Curro was also the Communications Manager for Sustainability Victoria—the greenhouse reduction arm of the Victorian Government, and later a consultant with the executive search firm SHK, specialising in marketing and communications, corporate and public affairs, government relations, internal communication and sustainability.

Curro previously filled in for National Nine News Melbourne weekend presenter Jo Hall; she also used to present weekly Crimestoppers reports on the Nine Network.

She has also been a fill-in presenter for Carrie Bickmore on The Project, and was particularly prominent on the show in 2010–11. As of 2024, she is employed by Melbourne Archdiocese Catholic Schools Ltd as General Manager, Strategic Communications and Engagement.
