= Jane Doyle =

Australian television newsreader

Jane Doyle OAM
- Born: 9 February 1958 (age 68); Adelaide, Australia
- Occupation: News presenter
- Years active: 1981–present
- Employer: Seven Network
- Known for: Seven News Adelaide
- Spouse: Ian Doyle

Jane Doyle (born 9 February 1958) is a retired Australian television presenter who was best known for presenting Seven News in Adelaide between 1989 and 2022, having joined the Seven Network from ABC TV.

== Early career ==
Doyle began as a school teacher before moving in journalism in far-north Queensland. In 1981, she and her husband, fellow journalist Ian Doyle, moved to regional South Australia where she held a number of positions with ABC Local Radio and local newspapers.

== ABC News ==
After arriving in Adelaide she returned to print as Adelaide editor of TV Week before again joining the ABC as a news reader. In 1988, after a year as substitute presenter for ABC TV's ABC News Adelaide, she became the main presenter of the 7pm bulletin.

== Seven News and Channel 7 ==
The following year, Doyle moved to SAS-7 to present Seven Nightly News with Graeme Goodings. She anchored her first night at the station on 28 August 1989.

She has also been a reporter on local programs such as Discover and Adelaide Weekender, and for many years she was a commentator for the broadcast of the annual Adelaide Christmas Pageant and the annual ANZAC Day parade. She also has hosted Carols by Candlelight where she also displayed her talent for singing with some renditions of classic Christmas carols. Since January 2005, she has also worked on the 5AA breakfast radio show.

She was awarded a Medal of the Order of Australia in the 2022 Australia Day Honours for service to the broadcast media, particularly to television, and to the community.

On 17 November 2022, Doyle announced that she would retire from Seven News after 33 years with the Seven Network. She experienced increasing difficulty delivering the news in the months and years leading up to this announcement, evident by her ever increasing mid-bulletin word stumbles and coughing bouts. Her last bulletin was on 15 December. On 2 December 2022, it was announced that Will Goodings and Rosanna Mangiarelli would succeed Doyle on weeknights.
