= Michael Smyth (journalist) =

Australian journalist and broadcaster

Michael Smyth is an Australian journalist and broadcaster based in Adelaide, South Australia.

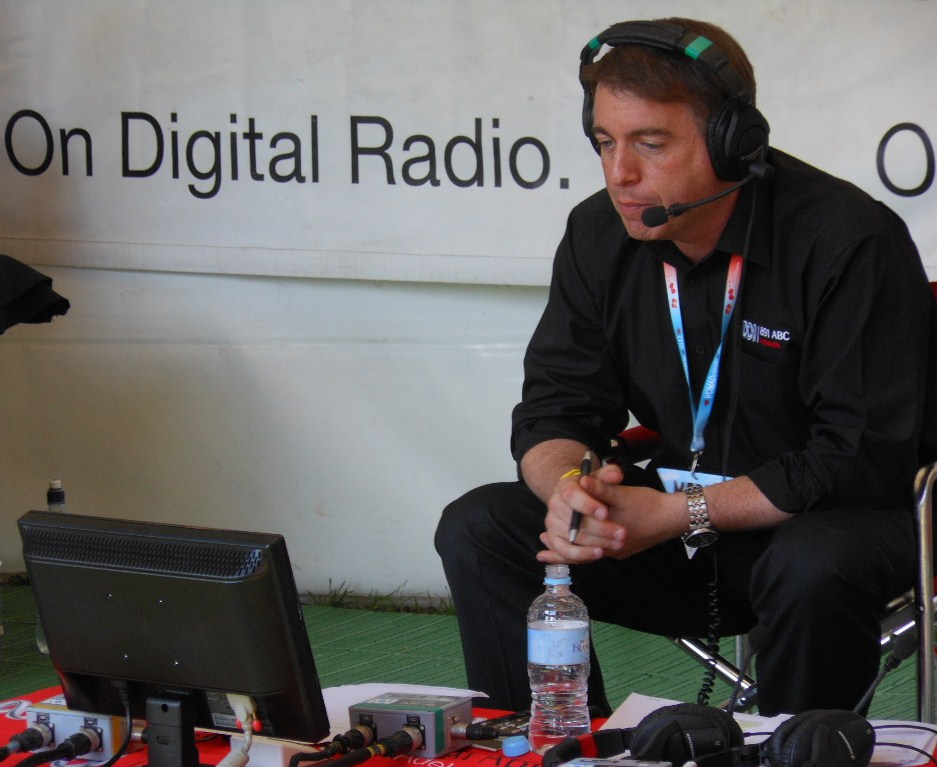
At WOMAdelaide

== Career ==
Smyth was a reporter and newsreader with the Australian Broadcasting Corporation in its Adelaide newsroom for almost 12 years. During that time he read the South Australian edition of the 7PM TV News. He also reported for and produced the now-defunct weekly ABC TV local current affairs program Stateline and occasionally presented programs on 891 ABC Adelaide. In 2005 he won the SA Media Award for Best TV Broadcaster.

In September 2008 Smyth left the ABC to join NWS–9 as a senior reporter for Nine News and in 2011 began presenting the weekday news with Kate Collins. In October that year it was announced that Smyth's contract would not be renewed, as part of cost-cutting measures by then station owner WIN TV. Longtime weekend newsreader Georgina McGuinness was also let go.

In early 2012 Smyth returned to the ABC as host of the 891 ABC Adelaide Drive program, where he picked up a number of awards, including for breaking the story of Adelaide Zoo's controversial deal with Street's ice cream, which contravened its long-held policy against the use of palm oil.

In November 2015, the ABC announced that Smyth would be departing ABC Local Radio at the end of 2015. Three days later it emerged that the ABC had refused to extend his contract. Smyth told InDaily that he had planned to continue with the ABC and that his sacking had been "quite a surprise, it's fair to say" when informed of the decision by station manager Graeme Bennett.

Smyth now works as a producer for Seven News and presents a weekly 'Flashback' segment.

In August 2025, he was appointed Deputy News Director at Seven News Adelaide.
