= Dominique Schwartz =

Australian communications specialist

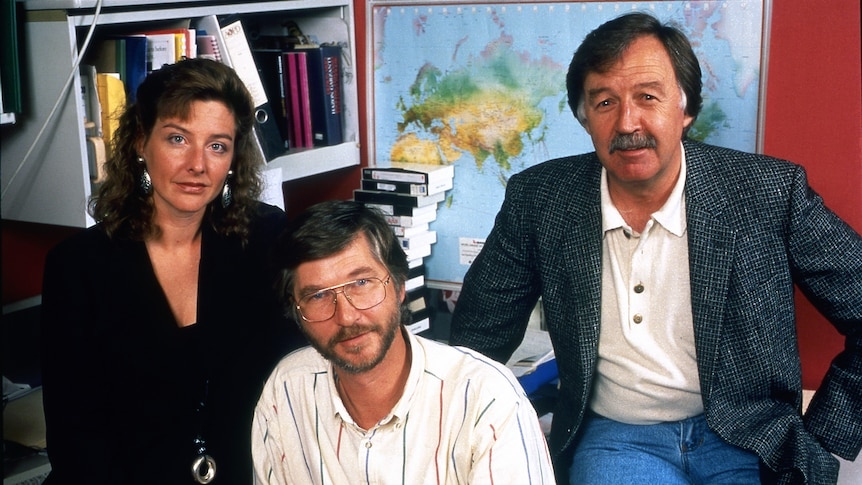
- Dominique Schwartz (left) and Peter George (centre) alongside presenter George Negus (right).
- Years active: 1982 to present
- Known for: being a founding reporter on Foreign Correspondent; anchoring ABC TV's 7pm news in Adelaide
- Television: SBS World News, Foreign Correspondent, ABC News, The 7.30 Report, Lateline, Landline

Dominique Schwartz is an Australian communications specialist and former television journalist and news presenter.

She is best known for her association with the Australian Broadcasting Corporation, where she worked as a foreign correspondent and as anchor of ABC TV's 7pm news in Adelaide.

== Career ==
Born in Sydney but growing up in Perth, Schwartz began her media career in 1982 when she secured a cadetship at the ABC after graduating from high school, working in the newsrooms for both ABC Television and ABC Radio. She then moved to the ABC in Melbourne where she was based in the ABC's radio current affairs department, working on programs such as AM and The World Today.

In 1986, she moved to SBS where she was one of four permanent Melbourne-based reporters for SBS World News. Following a brief period with the Seven Network where she worked on Terry Willesee Tonight, Schwartz relocated to Japan. In Japan, she was an editor for Knight Ridder's news wire service while also working as a reporter and presenter for Japan Cable Television.

In 1992, Schwartz became a founding reporter for ABC TV's new current affairs program Foreign Correspondent, hosted by George Negus. She worked on the program as a full-time reporter for six years, becoming an occasional contributor after being appointed as the ABC's Jerusalem-based Middle East correspondent in 1997. In that role, she continued filing stories for Foreign Correspondent, as well as Lateline and The 7.30 Report.

Schwartz was appointed as the anchor of the South Australian edition of ABC News on ABS-2 in 2001. She continued in that role until 2010 when she took up the position as the ABC's New Zealand correspondent in 2010.

In late 2014, Schwartz returned to Australia and became the ABC's national rural and regional correspondent, based in Brisbane.

Her time at the ABC came to an end in 2020 when she was one of a number of high-profile presenters and reporters whose positions were made redundant.

Since leaving the ABC, Schwartz has worked as the associate director of communications for the Regional Australia Institute, and as the senior associate of communications for Pew Charitable Trusts.

== Awards ==
In 1996, Schwartz won the UNESCO gold award at the New York Film Festival for her Foreign Correspondent story about Burkina Faso's quest to ending female genital mutilation.

In 2002, Schwartz received the Barbara Polkinghorne Award in South Australia for her contribution to the media.

Schwartz has also won two Queensland Clarion Awards. She was recognised in the All Media - Rural Journalism category for her "Death Row Dingoes" story in 2017 and was the co-recipient of the same award for the "Tension on the Tracks" story with Alexandra Blucher in 2018.
