= Emmy Kubainski =

Australian journalist (born 1986)

- Born: 1986 (age 39–40); Queensland, Australia
- Education: Queensland University of Technology
- Occupations: Journalist and News presenter
- Years active: 2005–2018
- Spouse: Tom
- Children: 2

Emmy Kubainski (born 1986) is an Australian former journalist and news presenter.

== Career ==
Kubainski graduated from the Queensland University of Technology with a Bachelor of Laws and a Masters in Journalism. She moved to Western Australia after securing a national cadetship with the ABC in 2005.

In 2007, Kubainski won the Best Newcomer Prize at the WA Media Awards. Kubainski joined Channel 7 Perth in October 2007 as a reporter and began presenting Seven News Perth weekend news in June 2008 as well as being the court reporter.

In October 2009, Kubainski filled in as a news presenter on Sunrise while Natalie Barr was co-hosting as Melissa Doyle was on holidays.

In December 2010, Kubainski filled in for Ann Sanders on Seven Morning News, presented news updates on The Morning Show and Seven Late News Updates. She has also presented Today Tonight in Sydney.

In October 2012, Kubainski moved back to her hometown of Brisbane. She finished as weekend presenter of Seven News in January 2013 with Blake Johnson and Samantha Jolly announced as her replacements in a sharing capacity. Kubainski joined Seven News Brisbane as a reporter.

In February 2015, Kubainski moved back to Perth and joined the Nine Network. She replaced Libby Stone (who returned to Nine News Queensland) as a co-anchor on Nine News with Tim McMillan from April. In her first year, Nine News' national ratings were the strongest it had been for over a decade, but in subsequent years the ratings deteriorated and in December 2017, the Nine Network announced that Kubainski's and McMillan's contracts would not be renewed.

Since 2018, Kubainski has worked for the Queensland government.

== Personal life ==
Kubainski is of both Filipino and German heritage. She was born in Queensland and moved to Perth after she secured a national cadetship with the ABC in 2005 with then-boyfriend lawyer Tom Fotheringham. Kubainski and Fotheringham met while studying at Queensland University of Technology and married in 2009 at Margaret River.

Kubainski has two children.

Media offices
Preceded by Libby Stone	Nine News Perth; Presenter with Tim McMillan; April 2015 – December 2017	Succeeded by Michael Thomson
Preceded by Paula Voce & Yvette Mooney	Seven News Perth; Weekend presenter 2008–2013	Succeeded by Blake Johnson & Samantha Jolly
