= Kelly Nestor =

Australian television news presenter

- Born: 22 August 1968 (age 58); Broken Hill, New South Wales
- Occupation: Journalist
- Years active: 1989–present
- Website: https://www.kellynestor.com.au/

Kelly Nestor (born 22 August 1968) is an Australian television and radio presenter and is working for ABC Radio Adelaide.

== Biography ==
Nestor was born and raised in Broken Hill, New South Wales, but made her name as a news presenter in Adelaide.

Nestor studied for a Bachelor of Arts (Journalism) from 1987 to 1989 at the South Australian College of Advanced Education's Magill Campus, now part of the University of South Australia in Adelaide. Nestor began work as a reporter at Central TV Network (GTS BKN) in Port Pirie in 1989.

Nestor moved to the ABC in Adelaide and worked as a journalist and presenter for South Australia's ABC News as well as the presenter of Stateline for almost three years. She also worked as a reporter, producer and presenter for the Adelaide, Perth and Darwin editions of The 7:30 Report at the ABC, as well as later working on the national version in Sydney.

Nestor became the weekday presenter of ABC News in Adelaide and later moved to Melbourne to present Ten News at Five Adelaide, which was produced in Melbourne at the time. Following a number of years as presenter of Ten News at Five, Nestor left to Network Ten move to Sydney where she became a part-time presenter with Sky News Australia.

On 19 September 2007, following the death of Kevin Crease in April that year, it was announced that Nestor would return to Adelaide to present Nine News. Nestor began as presenter of Nine News on 8 October 2007, working alongside Rob Kelvin. In February 2008, Nestor started casual radio work presenting the afternoon programme on Adelaide talk radio station (5AA) FIVEaa.

On 26 November 2009, one day after the axing of the local A Current Affair was announced, Nestor announced live on air that her contract with NWS9 was not going to be renewed next year and she would finish on 18 December 2009.

In 2017, in the wake of the 2015-16 Nuclear Fuel Cycle Royal Commission and subsequent Citizens' Jury, Nestor wrote an opinion piece for The Advertiser urging South Australian opposition leader Steven Marshall to reconsider his party's opposition to considering the future importation and storage of international nuclear waste in South Australia. She claimed that she was neither for nor against the proposal but wanted to be informed.

Nestor returned to broadcasting, at ABC Radio Adelaide in 2023 as a fill-in presenter.
