= Peter Holland (broadcaster) =

Former media educator and television and radio broadcaster

Peter Holland (born 1944) (also known as Austin Holland) is an Australian former broadcaster, interviewer and newsreader, who worked for the Australian Broadcasting Corporation in radio and television news from 1966 to 1998 and then Channel Nine from 1998 to 2003. He then became a senior lecturer at the Western Australian Academy of Performing Arts.

In the 1984 federal election he unsuccessfully ran for the seat of Forrest for the Australian Labor Party.

In 1995, he won the Western Australian Citizen Of The Year (community services) award. He won the Premier's Book Award in 1994 for an anthology of Western Australian writing.

In 2003, in the midst of National Nine News' national dominance in the ratings, Holland left his role with local television station STW and took up a full-time teaching post with Edith Cowan University, having been a part-time member of staff since 2001. Since 2005, he has been coordinator of the Graduate Diploma of Broadcasting course at the Western Australian Academy of Performing Arts at the Edith Cowan University campus.

Holland currently resides in the Perth Hills, where he has lived since 1972.

== Works ==
- As interviewer in Talking theatre (1993): Perth, W.A : PICA Press, ISBN 1-875386-21-1. "This small volume consists of interviews first broadcast on the ABC Radio programme `Peter Holland's Sunday' April to August 1993 on 720 6WF" included: Bill Dunstone, Andrew Ross, Alan Becher, Angela Chaplin, Barry Moreland, Edgar Metcalfe, David Britton, David Hough, David Williams (journalist), Geoff Kelso and Ray Omodei.
- As editor (1993): Summer shorts : stories-poems-articles-images, South Fremantle, W.A : Fremantle Arts Centre Press. ISBN 1-86368-065-9
- As editor with Barbara Holland (1994): Summer shorts : stories-poems-articles-images. 2, South Fremantle, W.A : Fremantle Arts Centre Press. ISBN 1-86368-100-0
- With Liz Byrski (1996): The grapevine : quick and tasty cookbook
