= George Donikian =

Australian television presenter

- Born: George Jack Donikian; 15 December 1951 (age 74); Sydney, New South Wales, Australia
- Occupations: Radio and television presenter
- Years active: 1975−present
- Known for: News anchor/media professional/sport
- Spouses: Athena Donikian (m. 1979–1987) Di Gillett (m. 2005)
- Children: 1
- Website: donikianmedia.com.au

George Jack Donikian (born 15 December 1951) is an Australian former radio and television news presenter/personality. He has worked at the SBS as well as the Nine Network and Ten Network.

== Early life ==
Donikian was born and raised in Kingsford, Sydney. His father was a Greek Armenian who had emigrated to Australia from Athens in 1949, with his fiancée following a year later. He grew up speaking Greek, Armenian and Turkish, and did not speak English until the age of 7. Despite his father's wish for him to become a doctor or barrister, Donikian found his calling in sports, in particular soccer. At the age of 16, his soccer skills brought him to the notice of Jozef Vengloš, the manager of the national team, however his sporting hopes ended when he dislocated his shoulder whilst lifting weights in training.

== Radio career ==
Donikian commenced his media career as an announcer with radio station 4AM in far North Queensland in the mid-1970s, then went to 2WL in Wollongong. According to Donikian, he was asked to go by the surname "Donekan" during his radio career—his bosses claiming that his real name was too difficult to pronounce and remember, and that the pseudonym sounded like the more "acceptable" Irish surname "Donegan". Then he went to 2WS in 1979. Then he did talk back on Radio FIVEaa in Adelaide. Then he covered the Athens Olympics for Melbourne commercial radio in 2004.

== Television career ==
Donikian's television career began in 1980, when during a chance meeting he impressed Bruce Gyngell, who saw him as the ideal presenter for his multi cultural I.M.B.C television Network which launched in Melbourne and Sydney in 1980. Then he was a presenter for SBS World News, then as a newsreader for the Nine Network, and later Ten News

In 1988, Donikian hosted the first Ethnic Business Awards, which is a national business award highlighting migrant and Indigenous excellence in business.

When Donikian first presented Ten News in 1991, he presented the weeknight bulletin solo before being joined by Nikki Dwyer the following year. He left Network Ten in September 2011, and became a "free agent" after a restructuring of Ten's newsroom saw him shifted to the weekend national evening bulletin.

Due to his popularity, he was parodied by comedian Steve Vizard in various skits on the comedy sketch program Fast Forward.
