= Marie-Louise Theile =

Australian news presenter

Marie-Louise Theile (born 1966) is a former Australian news presenter. She presented Ten News at Five in Brisbane and Melbourne.

She is currently the Director of New Initiative.

== Life ==
Born in Brisbane, Theile graduated at the University of Queensland. Theile worked as a reporter for The Sun, before she moved to New York City where she worked at Elle magazine. She then spent time in the New York Bureau of Brisbane's Sunday Sun and the Adelaide News. When she returned to Queensland she worked as a journalist writing for Ita, Cleo and Vogue Living magazines, as well as The Australian before joining ABC Television as a news reporter.

In May 1991 Theile co-hosted the 6:00pm Ten Eyewitness News with Glenn Taylor in Brisbane. In early 1994 Theile took up a position as newsreader for Ten News in Melbourne with David Johnston. In 1997 she returned to Ten News Brisbane. She also substituted on the national late news.

In December 2007, she left Ten News; her last broadcast was on Friday 7 December 2007.

Theile is the Director of New Initiative which has grown from the James Street Initiative (JSI) - which evolved eight years ago in conjunction with Brisbane property developers. JSI was created to establish a renewal project in James Street.

Theile is a past Chairman of the Board of the IMA - Institute of Modern Art - Australia's second oldest contemporary artspace. In 2010 Theile was appointed by the QLD Government to promote QLD fashion designers in international markets. This involved the creation and management of a major media launch in Shanghai. This project secured international coverage for other QLD fashion designers in US and European press.

Between 2008 and 2010 Theile also worked for the Great Barrier Reef Foundation, assisting with media relations and the development of the Whiteout schools program. She previously sat on the Brisbane City Council's Save City Hall committee and appeared in their promotional / educational media campaign.

From 2006 to 2012 Theile was a regular participant in the Brisbane Writers Festival where she has chaired sessions interviewing 4–6 writers per year, including Chris Cleave, Michael Robotham, William McInnes and Graeme Blundell.

She also continues to be involved with a number of charities, primarily Karuna, for which she has been an ambassador for 15 years. Throughout her television career Theile assisted and worked to assist with fundraising for many charities and organisations.

Theile also sat on the Mercedes Benz Fashion Festival Advisory Committee for 2009 and 2010. In this role she also facilitated educational Fashion Forum in Cairns for regional fashion designers.
