= Frank Warrick =

Australian journalist and newsreader (1944–2021)

Frank Warrick OAM
- Born: Francis Michael Warrick; 1944; Australia
- Died: 11 May 2021 (aged 76)
- Occupations: News presenter, journalist, DJ
- Employer(s): Seven Network, Nine Network
- Known for: Newsreader at Seven Brisbane

Francis Michael Warrick OAM (1944 – 11 May 2021) was an Australian journalist and newsreader and TV game show host.

== Biography ==
Warrick began his career in radio as a disc jockey in Toowoomba in 1963 with AM radio station 4GR, and at 4pm on September 30 in 1967, he was the first voice heard on the new Gold Coast AM radio station 4GG. Warrick joined Seven Brisbane as a newsreader in 1976 and served in the position until his retirement in 2001, including a role as co-presenter of 13 years opposite Kay McGrath. In 1991, prison escapee Harold John McSweeney surrendered to Warrick and a television helicopter crew on the Queensland Darling Downs, purportedly to avoid being shot by the Queensland Police. Warrick hosted the game show The $1,000,000 Chance of a Lifetime in 1999—before the program was taken over by sports journalist Sandy Roberts. Warrick was also a regular host on the Australian documentary series The World Around Us. In 1994, Warrick was awarded the OAM for "services to the media, to environment, and to the community".

He died aged 76 on 11 May 2021 following a five-year battle with dementia.
