= Bill McDonald (Australian journalist) =

Australian journalist and news presenter (born 1967)

- Born: 1967 (age 58–59); Brisbane, Queensland, Australia
- Occupations: News presenter & journalist
- Spouse: Julianne
- Children: 4 - Jordan McDonald, Hamish McDonald, William McDonald, James McDonald
- Website: Bill McDonald profile

Bill McDonald (born 1967) is an Australian journalist, news presenter, and radio announcer for 4BC Mornings.

== Career ==
Previously McDonald had been a sports presenter but was promoted to news presenter when Geoff Mullins left Ten News. He was also a sports presenter on Seven News.

In the summer of January 2010, McDonald presented Ten Early News, Ten Morning News and Ten Weekend News from Sydney.

In 2011, McDonald continued to present 10 News First Queensland and also continued to be the Queensland AFL ground commentator for Ten's national AFL coverage, mainly for matches involving the Brisbane Lions.

McDonald is active in other media and events in Brisbane. He broadcasts daily AFL reports on the Macquarie Southern Cross national radio network daily, as well as his Friday footy tips on Sunshine Coast's 92.7 Mix FM. He's a regular MC at functions and in 2010 was appointed as the Queensland Rugby Club's corporate lunch host until 2012. McDonald has also commentated AFL for Triple M Radio Network and NIRS.

In November 2012, McDonald resigned from Network Ten.

In January 2013, McDonald joined the Seven Network and started co-presenting Seven News from Sunday to Thursday with Sharyn Ghidella.

In 2015, McDonald co-hosted a documentary while crossing the Kokoda Track in Papua New Guinea, while also filing news reports and live crosses from the jungle along the way.

In March 2018, McDonald left the Seven Network, to concentrate on network sport and building his own media business billmcdonald.com.au.

For several years, McDonald was a member of the Triple M Radio AFL commentary team up until 2016. Prior to that he also commentated on NIRS and prior to that local AFLQ Grand Finals for Channel 7 in the early 1990s.

Since 2020, McDonald has presented various programs including 11am, Weekend Breakfast and Mornings on Brisbane commercial radio station 4BC. Since taking over from Ray Hadley as the host of 4BC Mornings in September 2023, his Executive Producer has been Michael Price.

== Personal life ==
McDonald was married Julianne, and they had four boys. They later separated. Julianne died in November 2023 from cancer.
