= ATN =

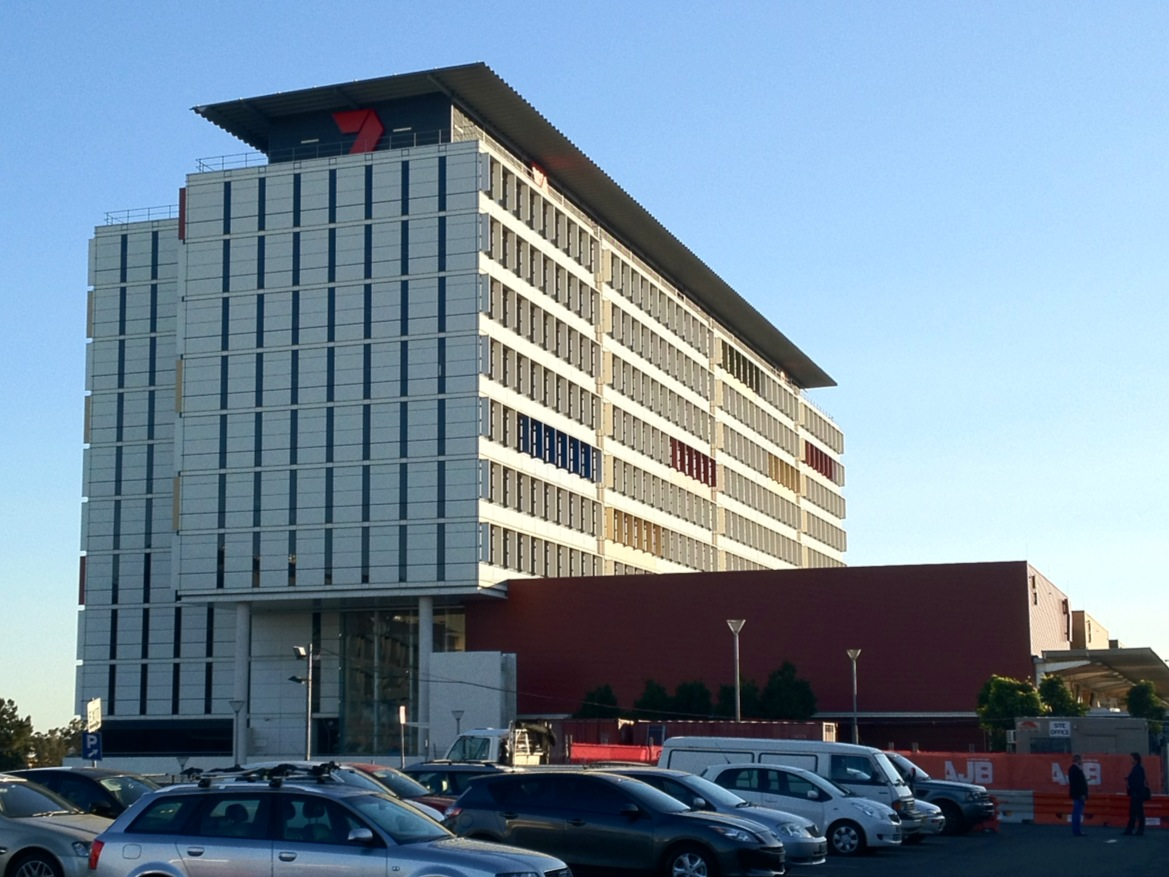
- Sydney, New South Wales; Australia
- Channels: Digital: 6 (VHF); Virtual: 7
- Branding: Seven

Programming
- Language: English
- Affiliations: Seven (O&O)

Ownership
- Owner: Seven Media Group; (Channel Seven Sydney Pty Ltd)

History
- First air date: 2 December 1956
- Former channel number: Analog: 7 (VHF) (1956–2013)
- Former affiliations: National Television Network (1956–1963)
- Call sign meaning: Amalgamated Television Services New South Wales

Technical information
- Licensing authority: Australian Communications & Media Authority
- ERP: 200 kW (analog); 50 kW (digital)
- HAAT: 249 metres (817 ft) (analog); 251 metres (823 ft) (digital)
- Transmitter coordinates: 33°48′20″S 151°10′51″E

Links
- Website: 7plus.com.au

ATN is the Sydney flagship television station of the Seven Network in Australia. The licence, issued to a company named Amalgamated Television Services, a subsidiary of John Fairfax & Sons, was one of the first four licences (two in Sydney, two in Melbourne) to be issued for commercial television stations in Australia.

The station formed an affiliation with GTV-9 Melbourne in 1957, in order to share content. In 1963, Frank Packer ended up owning both GTV-9 and TCN-9, so as a result the stations switched their previous affiliations. ATN-7 and HSV-7 joined to create the Australian Television Network, which later became the Seven Network. ATN-7 is the home of the national-level Seven News bulletins.

== History ==
Amalgamated Television Services was created in 1954 with plans to implement a television station equipped with what was considered to be the latest technology available as well as providing Australia's most extensive facilities made specifically for a television station.

ATN-7 began broadcasting on 2 December 1956 and became the third television station in Sydney to begin regular transmissions. Its principal offices and studios were located at Mobbs Lane, Epping. The initial black and white cameras and other equipment was supplied by the Marconi Company of England. At the time of opening, only Studio B, which housed the opening night, was operational, as well as a shortage of equipment. Its launch night was almost hampered by a thunderstorm, which ultimately did not affect the transmitter. On its second day of operations (3 December 1956), it aired the first current affairs programme on Australian television, At Seven Tonight, presented by Howard Craven. Later that evening saw the airing of Australia's first late show, Sydney Tonight, hosted by Keith Walsh. The nightly closedown featured an animation of a kangaroo putting her joey to bed, forming it out of the inscription "ATN CHANNEL 7". The animation remained in use for a long time. For many years, this was preceded by Tommy Leonetti's "My City of Sydney". Leonetti hosted The Tommy Leonetti Show, produced at the station, in 1969; he was the co-writer of the station's closedown theme.

The initial transmission tower in 1956 was located near the ABC tower at Gore Hill, Sydney. This was eventually demolished after ATN was invited to share a new site at Artarmon which was built by a new, third commercial broadcaster TEN-10.

In 1963, ATN began producing the local edition of the American Romper Room format, which would remain on air until 1988.

Conversion to PAL colour occurred on 1 March 1975. By that time, ATN was now housed in a six-studio complex which produced some of the most-watched Australian productions of the time. ATN engineers developed the RaceCam technology which was later employed around the world. Following the production of Rafferty's Rules, ATN's studios were now being increasingly used by other production companies. Successful shows of the late 80s and 90s taped at the ATN studios include Home and Away (which by 1996 had claimed a global audience of 65 million viewers; 11.5 million of which in the UK alone) and the infotainment format Beyond 2000.

Digital DVB-T commenced on 1 January 2001, broadcasting on VHF channel 6 while maintaining analogue transmission on VHF channel 7 until 2013.

ATN-7's Sydney transmissions are broadcast from masts operated by Transmitters Australia (TXA) at Artarmon and/or Willoughby. Retransmission translators to UHF channels service Sydney viewers from Kings Cross and North Head at Manly and north of Sydney at Bouddi, Gosford and Forresters Beach.

Beginning in the early 2000s, on-air programs were sent by digital link from the Seven Network's national program play-out centre at Docklands in Melbourne where the Master Control Room was located for all metropolitan and regional feeds to be controlled. Programming line-up, advertisement output, feed switching, time zone monitoring and national transmission output was previously delivered here. All Seven Network owned and operated studios used to have their live signals relayed here: for instance, ATN's output was fed to HSV and then transmitted via satellite or fibre optics to the towers around metropolitan Sydney. In 2019, however, this function was transferred to a new play-out centre in Sydney as part of a joint venture with the Nine Network.

The analogue signal for ATN-7 was turned off at 9:00 a.m. on 3 December 2013 by using a special five-minute retrospective clip of the local station and the song "My City of Sydney" by Tommy Leonetti, used for the first time in 30 years, combined with the old "Mother kangaroo putting her baby joey to bed" animation, which was played during the channel closedown sequence until the network began 24-hour service in 1993. The Good Night curtain at the end of the animation was tweaked to Goodbye and the TV mascot appeared for the final time to turn the analogue picture into a small white dot which slowly went away before going completely black, before the analogue signal itself was completely switched off.

In June 2023, 7NEWS moved their operations from Martin Place to their new purpose built studios in Eveleigh. In July 2023, Sunrise hosted its very first broadcast at its new studios. The first edition went to air live at 5:30 a.m. on 24 July 2023, with hosts Natalie Barr and Matt Shirvington, newsreader Edwina Bartholomew and sports presenter Mark Beretta, followed by The Morning Show's Larry Emdur and Kylie Gillies. Joining 7NEWS, 7NEWS Spotlight, The Latest and 7NEWS.com.au, for the first time in more than 40 years, the entire Seven Sydney operation and all broadcast and operational staff (across all departments) are now under one roof. The new space cover two floors of Seven's head office and are five times larger than the previous Martin Place location, with permanent sets for all programs. It brought to an end 19 years of Sunrise and Seven News, and 16 years of The Morning Show broadcasting at Martin Place.

== Program production ==
The Epping facilities were expanded to provide five operational studios and the centre became the largest producer of Australian produced TV content, including Wheel of Fortune, Sons and Daughters, A Country Practice, Hey Dad..!, All Saints, Terry Willesee Tonight and Home & Away.

The Epping studios closed in early 2010 when new studio facilities serviced by Global Television, opened at the Australian Technology Park in Eveleigh.

News and live telecast programs are presently broadcast from the Eveleigh studios.

== RaceCam ==
ATN's engineering staff received two Emmy Awards—making ATN the first Australian company to receive such an award—for the technology, invention and further development of RaceCam, live mobile point-of-view TV cameras which were initially developed in the late 1970s and early 1980s for the station's coverage of the Bathurst 1000. Visiting commentators from the United States organised for ATN staff to supply the camera and transmission systems for CBS's coverage of NASCAR races.

A variant of RaceCam was also developed for yachts in the 1987 America's Cup off the coast of Fremantle. Later in the mid-1980s, the American Broadcasting Company asked ATN staff to develop aerofoil-designed cameras suitable for Formula One cars, and these were subsequently used at the Indianapolis 500.

== Seven's Eveleigh Studios ==
The set used for Seven News

Prior to their Eveleigh Studios at the Australian Technology Park, the Seven Network's Martin Place studios, once referred to on-air as News Central and based on the first five floors of The Colonial Building in Sydney were the main news presentation studios for, Seven News Sydney, Sunrise, Weekend Sunrise, and The Morning Show. Comprising 3,000 square metres, viewers and tourists can see programs being broadcast from the street level studio.

In March 2021, it was announced that the Seven Network would move out of Martin Place to Eveleigh by the end of 2022 after almost two decades. The decision is understood to be a cost-saving move away from CBD property leasing. This then got delayed to June 2023.

On 25 June 2023, Seven News Sydney signed off its final bulletin at Martin Place studios, wrapping 19 years and 6,873 days of broadcast. Since 26 June 2023, its new broadcast home is at a purpose-built studio at Eveleigh headquarters. The new space is five times larger than Martin Place, allows for permanent sets for all programs, with two complete control rooms and more than 40 m^{2} of LED screens, while all newsroom operations will now be located on a second entire floor.

== Seven News ==
Seven News Sydney reporter Jessica Dietrich reporting outside the Australian Broadcasting Corporation's Ultimo studios in Sydney

Seven News Sydney is directed by Geoff Dunn and presented by Mark Ferguson and Angela Cox from Sunday to Wednesday and Michael Usher and Angie Asimus from Thursday to Saturday from Seven's headquarters, located at Eveleigh. Sport is presented by Mel McLaughlin from Sunday to Thursday and Matt White on Friday and Saturday. Weather is presented by Angie Asimus on Tuesday and Wednesday and Angelique Opie from Thursday to Monday.

News updates for Sydney are presented throughout the afternoon and the early evenings, with news updates during the night being shown nationally, they can be seen on Seven, 7two and 7mate, as well as 7flix.

At the end of 2003, a year before all of the Seven Network's News and Current Affairs moved to Martin Place, the ill-fated dual presenter format of Ross Symonds and Ann Sanders came to an end after the pair failed to make an ratings impact in the Sydney market, losing viewers to competition winner Nine News Sydney (then National Nine News), which had led in the ratings for decades. After Ian Ross took over from both Symonds and Sanders in 2003, Seven News Sydney became the 6 p.m. ratings leader from February 2005 until 2010.

Ross presented his final bulletin for Seven News Sydney on Friday 27 November 2009 with Bath taking over as main weeknight presenter on Monday 30 November 2009. Former Nine News presenter Mark Ferguson took over from Bath as weekend news presenter from Saturday 28 November 2009. The bulletin retained its ratings lead until it was overtaken again by the rival Nine News bulletin in the ratings in 2011 – Seven's 6 p.m. bulletin won 14 out of 35 ratings weeks.

In January 2014, Mark Ferguson was appointed weeknight presenter, replacing Chris Bath due to poor ratings. Bath became weekend presenter and continued to host Sunday Night until her resignation in July 2015, after which Melissa Doyle took over. More changes to Sydney's news presenting team in subsequent months saw former Melbourne weather presenter David Brown replace Sarah Cumming as Sydney's weather presenter and Mel McLaughlin replace Jim Wilson as the sports presenter.

In August 2016, it was announced that Michael Usher would replace Melissa Doyle as Friday and Saturday presenter. Doyle will move into a new expanded role as senior correspondent and host of Sunday Night.

For its efforts in bringing news of the 2014 Sydney hostage crisis to the whole of Australia (ATN's Martin Place news rooms and facilities were evacuated and news operations shifted to a makeshift studio miles from the site, with additional coverage from other stations nationwide), Seven News Sydney became the 2015 Logie Awards winner for Most Outstanding News Coverage.

In June 2020, Jim Wilson left Seven after 28 years with the network, to become a new host of 2GB's Drive program. His last sports bulletin was 27 June 2020. It was later announced that Matt Shirvington would replace him.

On 5 November 2020, David Brown left the Sydney newsroom to return to Melbourne with Angie Asimus promoted to weeknights weather presenter.

In December 2020, it was announced Angela Cox would be joining Michael Usher as co-host of the weekend news bulletin from January 2021.

In June 2023, Matt Shirvington stepped down from his role of weekend sports presenter, to take up his new role as co-host of Sunrise. Matt Carmichael was announced as his replacement.

In September 2024, it was announced that Angela Cox would be joining Mark Ferguson as co-anchor of the weeknight bulletin.

In October 2024, it was announced that Angie Asimus would be joining Michael Usher as co-anchor of the weekend bulletin. Asimus would also continue her role as Sydney weather presenter alongside Mark Ferguson and Angela Cox on Tuesday and Wednesday.

In September 2025, it was announced that Matt Carmichael would be leaving Seven News after being axed. He will present his last bulletin at the end of October, after the Bathurst 1000.

In January 2026, it was announced Matt White would return to Seven News Sydney, eleven years after he departed. He would present for both News and Sport, and to front analysis on NRL coverage across bulletins nationwide each night.

In April 2026, it was announced that Mark Ferguson and Angela Cox would reduce their workload to 4 days a week presenting Seven News Sydney from Sunday to Wednesday, with Michael Usher and Angie Asimus presenting from Thursday to Saturday.

In September 2026, Amber Laidler announced her departure from Seven News Sydney after a decade of service serving 10 years with the network.

Fill-in presenters include Michael Usher, Angie Asimus, Hugh Whitfeld, Chris Reason and Paul Kadak (News), Matt White, David Woiwod, Tom Sacre, Liam Tapper, Johanna Griggs and Jelisa Apps (Sport) and Paul Kadak and Angelique Opie (Weather).

=== Presenters ===
Current presenters
Role	Bulletins						
Role	Sunday	Monday	Tuesday	Wednesday	Thursday	Friday	Saturday
News	Mark Ferguson (2014–present); Angela Cox (2024–present)				Michael Usher (2026–present); Angie Asimus (2026–present)		
Sport	Mel McLaughlin (2016–present)					Matt White (2026–present)	
Weather	Angelique Opie (2026–present)		Angie Asimus (2020–present)		Angelique Opie (2026–present)		

Afternoon news updates

- Natarsha Belling (until 2:00 p.m. on Monday – Thursday)
- Sally Bowrey (until 2:00 p.m. on Friday)
- Mark Ferguson (after 3:00 p.m. on Monday – Wednesday, after 4:00 p.m. on Sunday)
- Michael Usher or Angie Asimus (after 3:00 p.m. on Thursday and Friday, after 4:00 p.m. on Saturday)

Nightly news updates

- Mark Ferguson or Angela Cox (until 7:30 p.m. on Sunday – Wednesday)
- Michael Usher or Angie Asimus (after 8:30 p.m. on Thursday – Saturday)

Reporters

- Chris Reason (Senior)
- Mark Riley (Canberra Political Editor)
- Paul Kadak
- Sally Bowrey (Cultural Editor)
- Chris Maher
- Andrew Denney (Crime)
- Laura Banks (Crime)
- Tom Sacre
- Sam Payne
- Sarina Andaloro
- Hugh Whitfeld (Foreign Editor)
- Jelisa Apps (Sport)
- Tim Lester
- Leonie Ryan (Court Reporter)
- Grace Fitzgibbon (Bright Side Presenter)
- Angelique Opie (Property/Weather Presenter)
- Brianna Jackson
- Inga Neilsen

Fill-In Presenters

News

- Michael Usher
- Angie Asimus
- Chris Reason
- Hugh Whitfeld
- Paul Kadak

Sport

- Matt White
- David Woiwod
- Tom Sacre
- Liam Tapper
- Johanna Griggs
- Jelisa Apps

Weather

- Paul Kadak
- Angelique Opie

Sunrise/Weekend Sunrise correspondent

- Liam Tapper

== Programs produced by ATN-7 ==
=== Eveleigh ===
- Sunrise Early News
- Sunrise
- The Morning Show
- The Morning Show: Weekend
- Weekend Sunrise
- Seven's National News at Noon
- Seven News at 4
- Seven News Sydney
- Test Cricket coverage (2018–present)
- Women's Big Bash League coverage (2018–present)
- Big Bash League coverage (2018–present)
- Cricket World Cup coverage (2018–present)

=== Current productions at Australian Technology Park ===
- Home & Away (1988–present)
- My Kitchen Rules (2010–present)
- The Chase Australia (2021–present)

=== Filmed at FOX Studios ===
- The X Factor (2010–2016)

=== On location ===
- Better Homes and Gardens (1995–present)
- Sydney Weekender (1994–present)
- House Rules (2013–2019)
- Carols in the Domain (1982–present)
- Farmer Wants a Wife (2020–present)
- Schools Spectacular (2016–2019, 2021)
- Schools Spectacular Remixed (2020)

== Past programming ==
- Sunday Night (2009–2019)
- V8 Supercars (2007–2014, 2021–present)
- Packed to the Rafters (2008–2013)
- Today Tonight (ATN-7 1995–2001) (HSV-7 2001–2006) (ATN-7 2007–2012) (HSV-7 2013–2014)
- 11AM (1975–1999)
- Newsworld (1982–1989)
- Real Life (1992–1994, became Today Tonight from 1995)
- The Price Is Right (2012)
- The NightCap (2008)
- Wild Boys (2011)
- All Saints (1998–2009)
- Always Greener (2001–2003)
- Hey Dad..! (1987–1994)
- Sons and Daughters (1982–1987)
- A Country Practice (1981–1993)
- Wheel of Fortune (ADS-7 1981–1987) (SAS-7 1987–1996) (ATN-7 1996–2006)
- Denton (1994–1995)
- Who Dares Wins (1996–2000)
- The Real Seachange (2006)
- The Zoo (2007–2008)
- Saturday Disney (1997–2016)
- Playhouse Disney (2003–2007)
- The Big Arvo (2001–2005)
- Romper Room (1963–1988; local)
- Surf Patrol
- It's Academic (2005–2016)
- headLand (2005–2006)
- Popstars Live (2000–2002, 2004)
- Surprise Chef (2001–2003)
- The Daily Edition (2013–2020)
- Andrew Denton's Interview (2018–2019)
- The Dream with Roy and HG (2000, 2004)
- The Ice Dream with Roy and HG (2002)
- Win Roy & H.G.'s Money (2000)
- The Monday Dump (2001–2002)
- The Nation Dumps (2002)
- The Cream (2003)
- The Matty Johns Show (2010)
- Sportsworld (HSV-7 1987–2003) (ATN-7 2004–2006)
- The Mole (2005)
- Sunday Sunrise (1997–2004, 2005)
- Between Two Worlds (2020)
- Plate of Origin (2020)
- The Secret Daughter (2016–2017)
- Secret Bridesmaids' Business (2019)

Early efforts by the station included variety series Sydney Tonight (1956–1959), Captain Fortune Show (1956–1960) for children, soap opera Autumn Affair (1958–1959) and talent program TV Talent Scout (1957–1958).

== See also ==
- Television broadcasting in Australia
- Circle 7 logo
