= List of Australian television presenters =

This is a list of Australian television presenters and television journalists.

== Nine Network ==
- Peter Overton
- Alicia Loxley
- Tom Steinfort
- Peter Hitchener
- Melissa Downes
- Joel Dry
- Mia Glover
- James Bracey
- Emma Lawrence
- Tony Jones
- Sophie Walsh
- Allison Langdon
- Deborah Knight
- Belinda Russell
- Scherri-Lee Biggs
- Jayne Azzopardi
- Danika Mason
- Richard Wilkins
- Renee Bargh
- David Campbell
- Sylvia Jeffreys
- Michael Atkinson
- Alison Piotrowski

== Seven Network ==
- Mark Ferguson
- Angela Cox
- Michael Usher
- Angie Asimus
- Mel McLaughlin
- Matt White
- Angelique Opie
- Natalie Barr
- Matt Shirvington
- Edwina Bartholomew
- Sally Bowrey
- Larry Emdur
- Kylie Gillies
- Peter Mitchell
- Mike Amor
- Karina Carvalho
- Rebecca Maddern
- Angela Tsun
- Tim McMillan
- Rick Ardon
- Susannah Carr
- Kim Millar

== Network 10 ==
- Sandra Sully
- Jennifer Keyte
- Sharyn Ghidella
- Kate Freebairn
- Stephen Quartermain
- Max Burford
- Tara Rushton
- Josh Holt
- Jayde Cotic
- Liz Cantor
- Gretel Killeen
- Rebecca Gibney
- David Genat
- Julia Morris
- Sam Pang

== ABC ==
- Jeremy Fernandez
- Nakari Thorpe
- Lydia Feng
- Tamara Oudyn
- Iskhandar Razak
- Jessica van Vonderen
- Jared Coote
- Alexia Pesce
- Tom Saunders
- Adam Morgan
- Shaun Tan
- Guy Stayner
- Sabra Lane

== SBS ==
- Janice Petersen
- Catalina Flórez
- Ricardo Gonçalves

== Past presenters ==
- Karl Stefanovic (Nine Network)
- Amber Sherlock (Nine Network)
- Georgie Gardner (Nine Network)
- Tracy Grimshaw (Nine Network)
- David Koch (Seven Network)
- Mark Beretta (Seven Network)
- Osher Günsberg (Network 10)
- Peter Helliar (Network 10)
- Michael Rowland (ABC)
- Ben Fordham (Nine Network)
- Jenny Brockie (SBS)
- Mike Tomalaris (SBS)
- Craig Foster (SBS)
- Jesse Baird (Network 10) (died 2024)
- Bert Newton (Nine Network and Network Ten) (died 2021)
- Les Murray (SBS) (died 2017)
- Peter Harvey (Nine Network) (died 2013)
- Ian Ross (Nine Network and Seven Network) (died 2014)
- Mal Walden (Network Ten)
- Lee Lin Chin (SBS)
- Greg Pearce (Nine Network and Network Ten)
- Dixie Marshall (Nine Network)
- Garry Lyon (Nine Network)
- Heather Foord (Nine Network)
- Carrie Bickmore (Network Ten)

== See also ==
- List of Australian television series
