= 11AM (TV program) =

- Also known as: Eleven AM
- Genre: News magazine
- Presented by: Roger Climpson; Clive Robertson; Vincent Smith; Kerry O'Brien; Don Willesee; Ann Sanders
- Country of origin: Australia
- Original language: English
- No. of seasons: 18

Original release
- Network: Seven Network
- Release: 13 October 1975 – 28 May 1999

Related
- Sunrise and Weekend Sunrise

11AM (also known as Eleven AM) is an Australian news magazine television program that aired on the Seven Network from 11 am AEST to midday from 1975 to 1999.

== Overview ==
The hour-long news magazine program started on 13 October 1975 with Roger Climpson presenting, with a number of high-profile presenters since, including Clive Robertson, Steve Liebmann, Vincent Smith, Paul Lyneham, Kerry O'Brien, Don Willesee, Helen Wellings, Richard Zachariah, Ann Sanders and Sonia Kruger, among others. Ross Symonds, Darren McDonald, Melissa Doyle and Cameron Williams all featured as news presenters throughout the shows life.

Its most famous presenter was comedian Graham Kennedy.

It last aired on 28 May 1999, presented by Melissa Doyle, who was filling in for Anne Fulwood (who had already moved to Seven News Melbourne) and Andrew Daddo. Fulwood went on to co-anchor Seven News in Melbourne with David Johnston, and Daddo to present entertainment programs. 11AM was the forerunner to Seven Morning News, Sunrise and The Morning Show.
