= Just Folk =

- Genre: Music television
- Presented by: Gary Shearston
- Country of origin: Australia
- Original language: English

Production
- Running time: 30 minutes

Original release
- Network: ATN-7
- Release: 1965

Just Folk is a 1965 Australian television aired on Sydney station ATN-7 (it is not clear if it was shown on any other stations across Australia). It was a weekly half-hour series featuring folk music. Gary Shearston was the host. Despite the wiping of the era, an episode of this series is held by the National Film and Sound Archive. One episode featured singer Tina Date performing "Two Milk Maids Went A' Milking" and "An English Lament".
