= Nick Etchells =

Australian journalist

Nick Etchells is an Australian journalist.

Etchells pictured in November 2005

== Career ==
Nick Etchells is a veteran journalist and TV news presenter, with more than 20 years’ experience covering global and local news events, natural disasters – including the Japan Tsunami, bushfires and floods – and state, national and international politics.

He has covered events ranging from the inquest into Princess Diana's death to the violent breakdown of the Solomon Islands, and the red carpet of Hollywood's Golden Globe Awards. He has interviewed people from all walks of life including Richard Branson, Naomi Watts, Mohammed Al Fayed, Russell Crowe, John Travolta, Shane Warne, Toni Collette and many more.

Etchells completed a business degree at the Queensland University of Technology, and was then recruited by WIN Television to be a local reporter for WIN News in Rockhampton. From there he moved into radio news, with Brisbane's 4BC, and back to television with Ten News Brisbane where he spent two years as a Senior Court Reporter.

From 2004 to 2007, Etchells was a Senior Reporter for Seven News based in Melbourne. During this time he filed hundreds of stories of national and international interest including the Beaconsfield Mine collapse, Cadel Evans' historic Tour de France campaign, the hanging of Van Tuong Nguyen in Singapore and England's 'Suffolk Ripper' prostitute murders. In February 2007, he returned to Australia from Los Angeles where he worked as a Seven News U.S Correspondent.

Between 2007 and 2011, Etchells was a senior journalist for A Current Affair on the Nine Network.

In December 2011, Etchells returned to the Seven Network and replaced Nuala Hafner as Melbourne Correspondent on Sunrise.

Etchells remained on Sunrise as Melbourne Correspondent until March 2014 when he was replaced by Rebecca Maddern and became a reporter and fill in presenter on Seven News in Melbourne.

Etchells anchored coverage of the 2014 Sydney hostage crisis from the Melbourne newsroom from around 10:30am through to 3:00pm local time, when the Seven Network's Sydney newsroom was evacuated while The Morning Show was live to air.

In September 2016, Etchells resigned from the Seven Network. He joined 10 News First Melbourne as a Senior Reporter before becoming Executive Producer in late 2021.

Etchells returned to Seven News Melbourne in 2022 as Senior Producer, and became Executive Producer in April 2023.

== Personal life ==
Etchells was born in England, moving to Australia as a boy. He played ice hockey for a year in Canada.

Preceded by Nuala Hafner	Sunrise; Melbourne correspondent December 2011 – March 2014	Succeeded by Rebecca Maddern
