= Sunday Night (Australian TV program) =

Australian news and current affairs program

- Presented by: Melissa Doyle
- Country of origin: Australia
- Original language: English
- No. of seasons: 11
- No. of episodes: 300+

Production
- Production locations: Sydney, New South Wales
- Running time: 60 minutes

Original release
- Network: Seven Network
- Release: 8 February 2009 – 19 January 2020

Sunday Night is an Australian news and current affairs program produced and broadcast by the Seven Network. The program aired on Sunday nights and was hosted by Melissa Doyle. It premiered on Sunday 8 February 2009.

== History ==
Sunday Night was a newsmagazine show, featuring a mix of feature stories, investigative reports, forums and interviews. Unlike other newsmagazine programs, the show initially featured a live studio audience. Additionally, early episodes of the show were immediately followed by a companion program, The All in Call, a live question and answer session broadcast on Seven HD and online. The separate program was later axed, and the discussion was integrated into the final segment of Sunday Night. The axing of The All In Call also saw the removal of the studio audience, while later seasons dropped the final segment discussion altogether.

Mike Munro initially co-hosted the show with Chris Bath but stood down as co-host to concentrate on reporting in April 2011. Alex Cullen and Mark Ferguson have been fill-in presenters. Melissa Doyle succeeded Chris Bath as the show's host from August 2015.

In September 2019, the Seven Network announced that the show would be axed due to poor ratings and a changing television landscape. The last new episode aired on 24 November 2019, though repeats continued to be aired into January 2020.

== Correspondents ==
=== Host ===
- Melissa Doyle (2015–2019)

(In addition to reporting)

=== Reporters ===
- Alex Cullen (2010–2019)
- Steve Pennells (2013–2019)
- Denham Hitchcock (2014–2019)
- Matt Doran (2017–2019)
- Angela Cox (2017–2019)

=== Guest reporters ===
- Samantha Armytage (2009–2019)
- Molly Meldrum (2009–2019)
- Mike Amor (2009–2019)
- David Koch (2009–2019)
- Mark Riley (2009–2019)
- Tim Watson (2009–2019)
- Edwina Bartholomew (2010–2019)
- Steve Waugh (2010–2019)
- Mark Skaife (2010–2019)
- Kylie Gillies (2011–2019)
- Kerri-Anne Kennerley (2012–2019)
- Derryn Hinch (2012–2019)
- Ben Roberts-Smith (2013–2019)
- Dannii Minogue (2014–2019)
- Andrew Rochford (2014–2019)
- Sarah Murdoch (2014–2019)
- Simon Reeve (2016)

=== Former reporters ===
- Ross Coulthart (2009–2016)
- Mike Munro (2011)
- Monique Wright (2009–2012)
- Grant Denyer (2009–2013)
- Helen Kapalos (2014)
- Rebecca Maddern (2009–2015)
- Peta-Jane Madam (2012–2016)
- Rahni Sadler (2010–2017)
- Mike Willesee (2012–2018)

=== Former hosts ===
- Chris Bath (2009–2015)
- Mike Munro (2009–2011)

== Executive producers ==
- Adam Boland (2009)
- Mark Llewellyn (2009–2014)
- Steve Taylor (2014–2016)
- Hamish Thomson (2014–2019)

== See also ==
- Seven News
- List of Australian television series
