= Angie Asimus =

Australian journalist (born 1985)

- Born: 12 August 1985 (age 41); Australia
- Education: University of Sydney
- Occupations: News presenter, weather presenter, journalist
- Employer: Seven Network

Angie Asimus (born 12 August 1985) is an Australian news presenter and journalist.

Asimus presents Seven News Sydney with Michael Usher from Thursday to Saturday, and presents the weather on Tuesday and Wednesday alongside Mark Ferguson and Angela Cox.

== Career ==
Asimus was originally from Gundagai (in rural New South Wales) before moving to Sydney to study Media Communications at the University of Sydney. She received a Graduate Certificate in Climate Adaptation in 2012 from the University of Southern Queensland.

Her journalism career began in 2008 with Seven Queensland, reporting from the Townsville newsroom. In 2010, she joined Seven's Brisbane newsroom as a court reporter. During the 2011 floods, she presented the weather, which led to a full-time role as the weekend weather presenter. Alongside her work, she pursued additional studies in climatology at the University of Southern Queensland.

In 2012, Asimus began filling in as a news presenter, working alongside Patrick Condren and occasionally covering for Kay McGrath and Sharyn Ghidella. On July 12, 2013, she made her national debut, filling in for Ann Sanders on Seven Morning News and Seven Afternoon News.

Returning to Sydney in January 2014, Asimus took on a dual role as a reporter and weather presenter for Seven News Sydney. By 2016, she was appointed the presenter of Seven News at 5, airing on weekends. In November 2020, following David Brown's return to Melbourne, she was promoted to weather presenter.

In October 2024, it was announced that Asimus would join Michael Usher as co-host of the weekend bulletin. Asimus would also continue her role as a weather presenter alongside Mark Ferguson and Angela Cox on Tuesday and Wednesday.

In April 2026, it was announced that Mark Ferguson and Angela Cox would reduce their workload to 4 days a week presenting Seven News Sydney from Sunday to Wednesday, with Michael Usher and Asimus presenting from Thursday to Saturday.

Angie has also been a fill-in presenter on Sunrise and Weekend Sunrise.
