= David Brown (meteorologist) =

Australian meteorologist for Seven News (born 1959)

- Born: 12 July 1959 (age 67); Sydney, Australia
- Education: Monash University
- Occupations: Meteorologist; TV weather presenter
- Years active: 1981–2020

David Brown (born 12 July 1959) is a former Australian meteorologist and TV weather presenter.

Brown was formerly the weather presenter on Seven News Sydney, as well as on the national Seven Morning News and Seven Afternoon News bulletins, on Sunrise and Seven News Melbourne.

== Career ==
Brown was born in Sydney. He graduated from Caulfield Institute of Technology (now part of Monash University) in 1981 with a B.App.Sc. degree. He then worked at the Bureau of Meteorology before becoming a weather presenter, initially on Network Ten.

Brown is one of few television weather presenters who is also a meteorologist. His television career first began in the early 1990s at Channel Ten Melbourne (ATV–10) as a local weather presenter. In 1995, he left Channel Ten to join rival station Channel Seven Melbourne (HSV–7) where he also worked as weather presenter. He worked alongside news presenters David Johnston, Jennifer Keyte and Peter Mitchell. In 2003, while still presenting the local weather in Melbourne, Brown was appointed national weather presenter on the Seven Network's new national news bulletin at 4.30.

In January 2008, Brown replaced Monique Wright on Sunrise taking the role as weather presenter. Brown stayed as weather presenter for 6 months on Sunrise, whilst continuing with his other duties at the Seven Network on the national Seven 4.30 News and Seven News Melbourne. Brown quit the role in July 2008, citing his heavy work load (having to work on three separate news programs throughout a 12-hour span). His replacement was Fifi Box.

In February 2013, Brown was appointed network meteorologist, filing weather reports for Sunrise, Sunday Night and Seven News. After months of speculation and 17 years in the job, he was replaced as weeknight weather presenter on the Seven News Melbourne bulletin by Giaan Rooney.

In July 2014, Brown was appointed weather presenter on Seven Morning News.

In January 2016, Brown moved to Sydney and was appointed weather presenter on Seven News Sydney.

In November 2020, Brown stepped down as weather presenter on Seven News Sydney, citing a desire to spend more time with family in Melbourne.

== Personal life ==
Brown is married with two daughters. He is a Carlton supporter.
