= Paul Kadak =

Australian television journalist

Paul Kadak (born 18. October 1975) is an Australian television journalist.

Kadak is currently a reporter for Seven News in Sydney. He had previously been U.S. correspondent for the service between October 2018 and November 2020.

== Career ==
Kadak started his career in Perth, Western Australia, working for Seven News.

Some of the biggest stories he has reported on include the 2000 Olympic Games, the 2003 Rugby World Cup, Ansett Australia's last flight, the 2004 CityRail crisis and the Waterfall train disaster. He has also produced state election coverage for the Seven Network.

During the Tampa affair in 2001, Kadak was one of several journalists on the ground in Christmas Island, and his report included pictures of Australian troops boarding the ship. While on Christmas Island, he reported live not only to Seven News, but many radio stations across Australia, Sky News (UK) and CNN.

Kadak was on the ground just hours after the 2002 Bali Bombings, and spent a further two weeks in Bali, where he reported live to Sunrise and Seven News. Kadak was nominated for a Logie Award in 2002 in the category of Most Outstanding News Reporter, but did not win the award.

In September 2018, Kadak relocated to the United States after long-time correspondent Mike Amor returned home to Melbourne. In November 2020, Kadak returned home to Sydney and to his former post as reporter for Seven News Sydney after covering the 2020 United States presidential election for the Seven Network.

On Christmas Day 2021, Kadak presented the Seven News bulletin in Sydney.
