= Matt Wordsworth =

Australian television presenter

Matt Wordsworth is an Australian television presenter.

Wordsworth is a former weeknight presenter of ABC News Queensland in Brisbane.

Wordsworth attended Brisbane State High School.

== Career ==
In January 2018, it was announced he was chosen by the ABC as the new Monday to Thursday anchor of ABC News Queensland. Wordsworth replaced Karina Carvalho who had relocated to Sydney to present a national news bulletin on the ABC News channel.

Wordsworth hosted the ABC's state political program 7.30 Queensland until it was axed in late 2014.

He was also a regular Friday night presenter of the ABC's national current affairs program Lateline in its final year on air in 2017.

On 2 March 2023, Matt presented his last ABC Brisbane News program. He left the ABC to work in the private sector.

Media offices
Preceded by Karina Carvalho	ABC News QLD; Mondays to Thursdays Presenter; January 2018 – March 2023	Succeeded by Jessica van Vonderen (Sun-Thu)
