= Sally Bowrey =

Australian journalist, television presenter and weather presenter

- Born: Sydney, Australia
- Education: Charles Sturt University
- Occupations: Journalist; television news presenter; weather presenter
- Employer: Seven Network
- Known for: Weekend Sunrise as News presenter

Sally Bowrey is an Australian journalist, television news presenter and weather presenter for the Seven Network.

Bowrey is also currently news presenter on the Seven Network breakfast program Weekend Sunrise, as well as presenting Seven Afternoon News Sydney on Friday.

== Early life and education ==
Bowrey was born and raised in Sydney, New South Wales. She earned a degree in journalism from Charles Sturt University in Bathurst in 2003.

== Career ==
She began her career at Foxtel, anchoring Arena News Updates. In 2004 she became a weather presenter at The Weather Channel, where in 2005 she became the host of the morning programme, Your Weather Today.

For four years beginning in 2009, she worked at TVW in Perth, an affiliate of the Seven Network, as the weekend news presenter and as a reporter for the network's Western Australian news bulletin.

In 2012, Bowrey returned to Sydney, where she filled in as a weather presenter for Sarah Cumming while she was on maternity leave, and the following year, when Seven News began a live evening news bulletin, Seven News at 7, became the presenter for the Western Australia version. That programme was ended in April 2014; at the end of 2015 she again replaced Cumming during her maternity leave, as the weather presenter for the news bulletins at 4 pm and 7 pm, and she has since presented both weather and news on Sunrise, hosted coverage of the Queensland floods, and since 2016 been a presenter on Weekend Sunrise, where as of 2020 she is the news presenter.

In 2016, Bowrey was appointed the entertainment presenter on Weekend Sunrise, and in June 2017 was also appointed the news presenter for the program, in addition to her entertainment role. That same year, she became news presenter on Seven Morning News and Seven News at 4 on Friday, when Ann Sanders reduced her role to Monday to Thursday.

In June 2020, she was appointed the Friday news presenter on The Morning Show, after Ryan Phelan left the Seven Network.

In November 2020, Bowrey was appointed a weather presenter on Seven News Sydney, after David Brown departed the bulletin.

In October 2024, Bowrey launched 10:10 Be Well podcast with clinical nutritionist Sarah Di Lorenzo. The podcast covers health and wellness for 40+ women and men, looking for fact based, fun and achievable ways to look, live and feel better.

== Personal life ==
Bowrey married Richard Seddon, a property development manager, in 2010; they have a son and a daughter.
