= Karina Carvalho =

Australian journalist

- Born: 18 December 1980 (age 45); Sri Lanka
- Occupations: Broadcast journalist; News presenter
- Television: Seven News Melbourne
- Spouse: Terry Sweeney (m. 2015; div. 2019)

Karina Carvalho (born 28 December 1980) is an Australian journalist.

Carvalho is currently the weekend presenter of Seven News Melbourne from Friday to Sunday, and also presents Seven Afternoon News Melbourne on Monday and Tuesday.

== Early life ==
Carvalho was born in Sri Lanka and moved to Perth at the age of four.

She grew up participating in cross-country running and touch rugby.

== Career ==
Carvalho graduated with a journalism major from the Western Australian Academy of Performing Arts.

After gaining work experience in Perth and Sydney, she moved to the United Kingdom, where she undertook placements with the BBC as a journalist and producer. Her work included contributions to programs such as HARDtalk and assignments in the United States.

=== ABC ===
Carvalho returned to Perth in 2006 and joined the ABC the following year. She initially worked casually in the newsroom before being promoted to weekday presenter after the resignation of Alicia Gorey.

In February 2012, Carvalho relocated to Melbourne to co‑host ABC News Breakfast on ABC1 and ABC News 24 during Virginia Trioli’s maternity leave. She remained in the role until March 2013. During this period, she was among the last journalists to interview author Bryce Courtenay before his death and anchored coverage of major flooding from Brisbane.

In April 2013, Carvalho was appointed presenter of ABC News Queensland, replacing David Curnow.

In January 2018, she became presenter of ABC Evening News on the ABC News channel and moved to Sydney. Matt Wordsworth succeeded her on ABC News Queensland.

Carvalho resigned from the ABC in December 2023, citing concerns about the organisation’s editorial direction.

=== Seven Network ===
In July 2024, she joined Seven News Melbourne as a presenter and reporter.

In January 2025, it was announced that she would replace Rebecca Maddern as weekend presenter alongside Mike Amor. In June 2025, she was also announced as a contestant on Dancing with the Stars, partnered with Andre Gresuik.

== Personal life ==
Carvalho became engaged to IT executive Terry Sweeney in September 2014, and they married on 5 January 2015. They announced their separation in 2019.

Media offices
Preceded by Alicia Gorey	ABC News WA; Presenter; May 2008 – December 2011	Succeeded by James McHale
Preceded by Virginia Trioli	ABC News Breakfast; Co-host with Michael Rowland; February 2012 – March 2013	Succeeded by Virginia Trioli
Preceded by David Curnow	ABC News QLD; Presenter; April 2013 – January 2018	Succeeded by Matt Wordsworth
