= Ian Ross (newsreader) =

Australian newsreader (1940–2014)

- Born: Ian Charles Ross; 24 June 1940; Waverley, New South Wales, Australia
- Died: 30 April 2014 (aged 73); Tugun, Queensland, Australia
- Occupation: Television journalist
- Years active: 1957–2013
- Television: Today; Nine News; Seven News
- Partner: Gray Bolte (1989–2014)
- Children: 3

Ian Charles "Roscoe" Ross (24 June 1940 – 30 April 2014) was an Australian television news presenter for Seven News in Sydney and for Nine News.

== Career ==
Commonly known as "Roscoe", Ross began his career in 1957 at Sydney radio station 2GB. He returned to Sydney as a National Nine News reporter in 1965. Ross remained at Nine for 38 years, where he was most known for his tenure as Today news presenter. There, he also presented National Nine News on many occasions, filling in for presenters who were either on leave or sick. In 1997, Ross appeared as himself in the acclaimed Australian film The Castle.

Moving out of retirement in Queensland, Ross joined the Seven Network in 2003, "lured back by the challenge of becoming Sydney's No 1 reader" to head the station's struggling flagship 6.00 pm bulletin. Despite making some steady progress in 2004, finishing with 13 weekly wins out of a possible 40, Seven News still finished third in Sydney behind Nine News and Ten News in that year's ratings, but by the following year it had become Sydney's number one news bulletin.

Before his final retirement, Ross was only hosting Sydney's edition of Seven News from Sunday to Wednesday, with Chris Bath hosting the news on Thursday, Friday and Saturday nights. Ross previously presented the news Monday to Thursday until Chris Bath began hosting Sunday Night.

On 27 November 2009, Ian Ross presented his final bulletin of Sydney's Seven News and officially retired from newsreading. He was visibly moved as he made his final farewells to his viewers and colleagues.

He was a guest on the first episode of Seven Network's The Daily Edition.

== Illness and death ==
In January 2014, at age 73, Ross publicly announced that he had been diagnosed with pancreatic cancer, and that it had spread to his liver. His doctors estimated that he had five months to live. He died on 30 April 2014 at the John Flynn Hospital in Tugun on the Gold Coast, survived by his partner Gray Bolte and his ex-wife, children and grandchildren, his sister Robin and step-brother Max. His funeral was held on the Gold Coast on 5 May 2014, and was attended by many of Ross's colleagues including former Today hosts Steve Liebmann and Tracy Grimshaw, as well as Seven News personalities Mark Ferguson, Chris Bath, Jim Wilson and Mark Beretta.
