= Matt Carmichael (journalist) =

Australian sports journalist

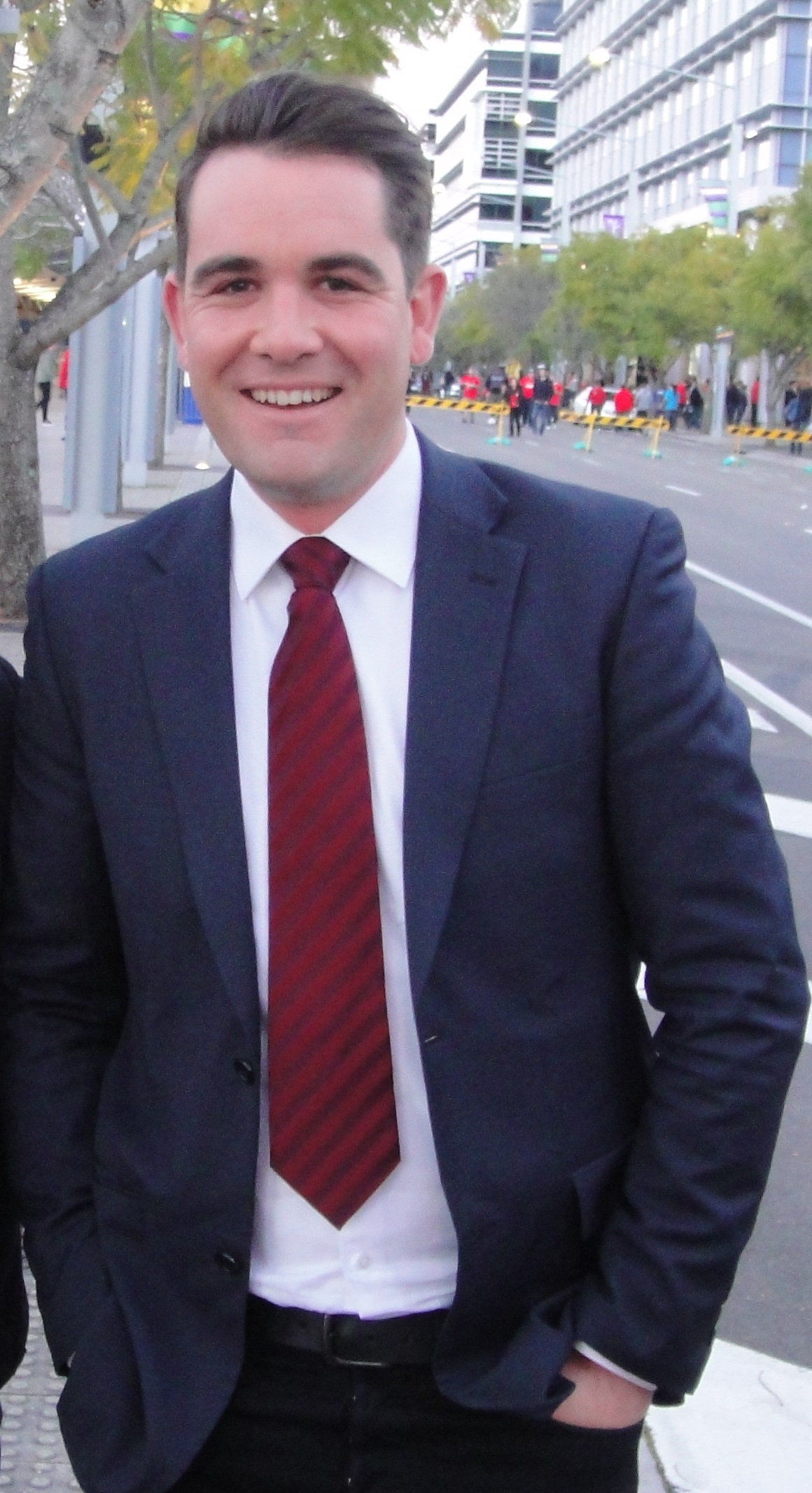
- Born: 21 April 1981 (age 44); Sydney, New South Wales, Australia
- Occupations: Sports presenter and reporter

Matt Carmichael (born 21 April 1981) is a sports journalist.

Carmichael has previously been a presenter and reporter for Seven News in Sydney.

== Career ==
Carmichael is a graduate of Brisbane State High School in Queensland, Australia, where he played rugby and cricket. He completed a Bachelor of Journalism at the Queensland University of Technology and then worked with the News-Mail in Bundaberg. He later joined Seven regional affiliate Seven Queensland and then Seven News Brisbane.

Carmichael has previously been a fill-in presenter for Pat Welsh and Ben Davis on Seven News Brisbane.

Carmichael is now based in Sydney working for Seven News as a full-time sports reporter.

In January 2011, Carmichael was appointed sport presenter on Seven News Sydney replacing Johanna Griggs.

In March 2013, Ryan Phelan succeeded him as full-time weekend sports presenter for Seven News Sydney.

In July 2023, Carmichael replaced Matt Shirvington as sport presenter on Seven News Sydney.

Carmichael is currently a fill in sport presenter on Seven Morning News, Seven Afternoon News, Sunrise, Seven News Sydney and Weekend Sunrise.

It was announced in September 2025 that Carmichael will depart Seven News Sydney after 23 years as a result of his role being made redundant.
