= Peter Mitchell (newsreader) =

Australian television presenter (born 1960)

- Born: 14 June 1960 (age 66); Melbourne, Victoria Australia
- Occupation: News presenter
- Years active: 1977–present
- Employer: Seven Network

Peter Mitchell (born 14 June 1960) is an Australian television presenter. He has been the chief news presenter of Seven News Melbourne since 2000, prior to which he was the weekend news presenter.

== Career ==
Mitchell began at the Nine Network in 1977 as a sport reporter. In this position he covered sports such as Australian rules football, golf, tennis and the Commonwealth Games. In 1982, he became a general news reporter and in this position he covered many stories including Victoria's Ash Wednesday bushfires in 1983.

In 1987, Mitchell joined the Seven Network and became weekend news presenter. He held this position for 13 years until November 2000 when he replaced David Johnston and Anne Fulwood as the solo weeknight presenter.

In 1997, Mitchell was the first news presenter in Australia to break the news, during an AFL match, that Princess Diana had died.

In a Seven News bulletin that went to air in March 2018, Mitchell used some inappropriate wording to describe a murder trial which was ongoing; he subsequently apologised to the Victorian Supreme Court for his actions.

His journalism experience has also included writing a weekly column for the Sunday Herald Sun for two years called "Tee for Two" and publishing a book – the biography of Australian golfer Peter Thomson.

== Awards ==
In 2010, Mitchell was inducted into the City of Frankston Hall of Fame as a tribute to his link to the city and the impact of his work.

== Personal life ==
Mitchell grew up on the Mornington Peninsula, attending The Peninsula School, in Mount Eliza.

His father, Geoff Mitchell, was a councillor on the Frankston City Council in the 1960s and 1970s, served a term as the mayor of Frankston (1970/1971) and also played football for Frankston in the VFA.

Mitchell is a Collingwood Football Club fan and began going to watch them play with his father when he was five years old.

He is married to wife Philippa and they have five children together, as well as five grandchildren.
