= Anne Fulwood =

Former reporter, journalist and writer

- Born: 5 February 1959 (age 67); Adelaide, South Australia, Australia
- Occupations: Reporter, journalist, writer
- Years active: 1982–2002
- Employer(s): Seven Network (1982-1987, 1995-2002), Ten Network (1987-1995)
- Spouse: John MacKinnon (former)

Anne Fulwood (born 5 February 1959) is an Australian former reporter, journalist and writer with a long association as a newsreader and current affairs host, she was born in South Australia's Riverland region and began her career in the state of South Australia.

== Career ==
Fulwood began her television career at the Seven Network at station ADS-7 (now ADS-10) in Adelaide in 1982 initially as a sports reporter. She became co-news anchor for Seven National News in late 1984 alongside presenter Kevin Crease, weatherman Keith Martyn and former football player Peter Marker on sports.

In 1987, she moved to Sydney, initially as a sports reporter, with Network Ten. She worked as a weekend news anchor for Eyewitness News as well as a reporter on Sydney with Mike Gibson.

In 1991 Fulwood joined Good Morning Australia as a newsreader, working alongside Kerri-Anne Kennerley and Tim Webster.

Fulwood came to national prominence as anchor of Ten's Late News from 1991 (when she succeeded inaugural host Eric Walters) to 1995.

In late 1995, Fulwood moved back to the Seven Network, initially as the presenter of its late news program and then as co-host on 11 AM, where she remained until the show's final episode in May 1999. Fulwood then moved to presenting Seven News Melbourne with David Johnston from mid 1999 through 2000. Fulwood ended her career for Seven presenting the Late News.

Fulwood briefly plied her trade twice in the United States, doing so at KTVV-TV (now known as KXAN) in Austin, Texas. The first time was a 'news anchor exchange' between her and Tonia Cooke. This was due to the fact Austin and Adelaide are sister cities and were celebrating their sesquicentennial. Fulwood was brought back a second time, this time co-anchoring with Cooke.

A tennis player, Fulwood has presented several sporting events, including Ten's coverage of the 1994 Commonwealth Games in Victoria, Canada and Seven's coverage of the 1996 Olympic Games in Atlanta.

== News Flash ==
The June 1993 issue of the Australian Penthouse Magazine hit the streets on Friday 14 May 1993.

As part of its regular on-going series of full-page caricatures of celebrities, drawn by Frantz Kantor, and known collectively as "Kantor's Celebrity Skins", a cartoon was published on page 33. With the title "News Flash", the caricature depicted an immaculately groomed, blonde female newsreader, sitting at her news desk, facing the camera, and completely naked from the waist down, with her legs spread apart clearly displaying her pubic hair and vulva below the desk. Beneath the artwork, in large print, was the caption "Anne Fulwood". As soon as she became aware of the matter, Fulwood threatened both Penthouse and Kantor with a defamation action.

The matter was settled out of court. Penthouse recalled and destroyed all unsold copies of the magazine and publicly apologized to Fulwood for its offensive treatment of her and the embarrassment it caused her. It also gave her all of Kantor's original drawings, sketches, prints and drafts of the cartoon in question.
