= Ross Symonds =

Australian journalist (born 1942)

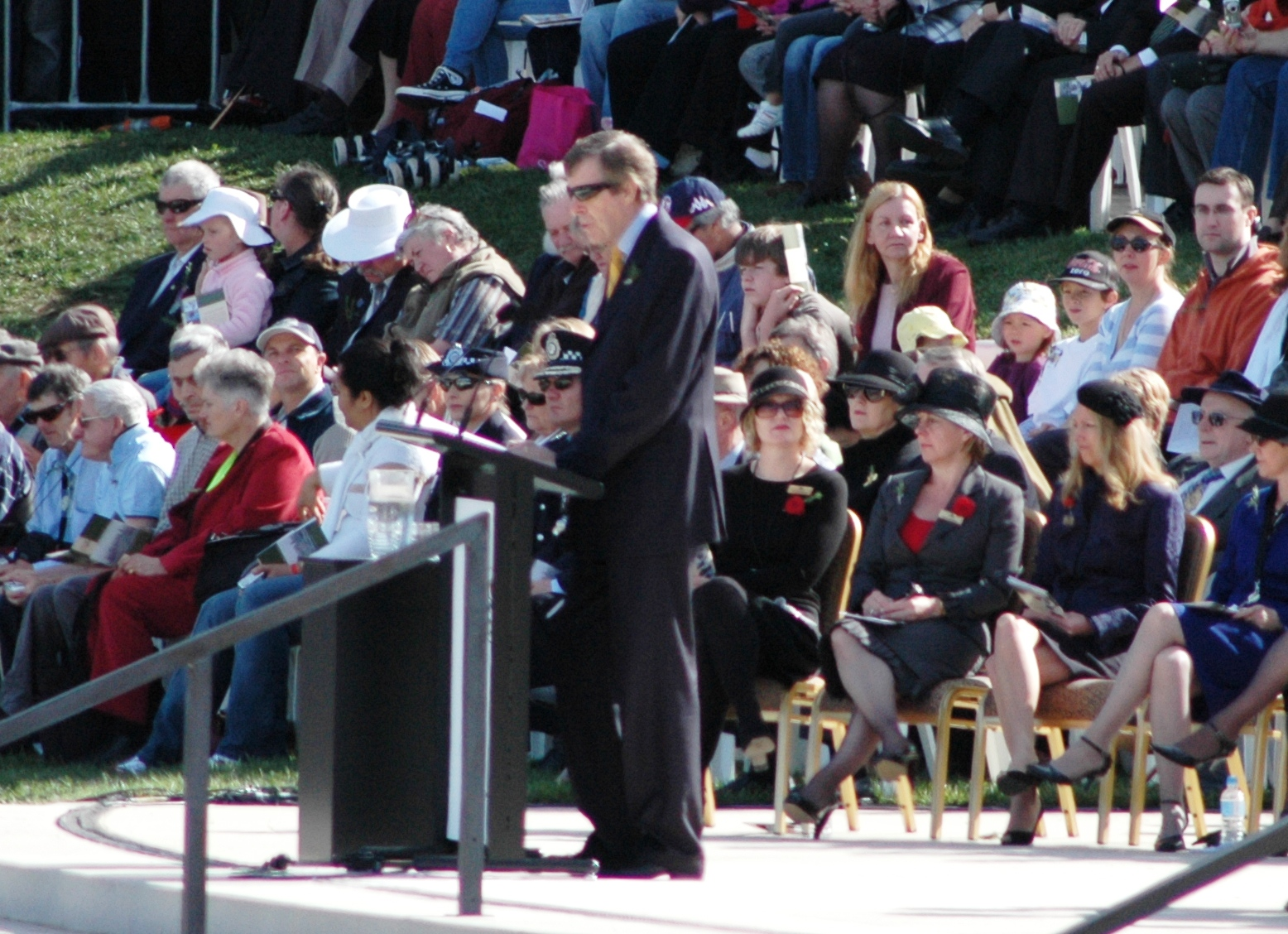
- Symonds as MC for the 2008 ANZAC DAY National Service Nath 4th Australian War Memorial, Canberra
- Born: 8 January 1942 (age 84); Brisbane, Queensland, Australia
- Occupations: News presenter/reporter; radio and television personality; real estate agent; spokesperson
- Years active: 1963−2007 (media career)
- Known for: ABC Radio Brisbane (1963-c.1975); Seven Nightly News (1981-2003); 11AM as newsreaders; 2UW as breakfast news presenter 1988-1994; Radio 2 (2005-2006)

Ross Symonds (born 8 January 1942) is an Australian former media personality, news presenter and reporter, radio and television personality and spokesman, best known for his association with the ABC starting in the early 1960s and subsequently the Seven Network in Sydney from the 1980s until the early 2000s. After leaving his media career he worked in real estate and advertising.

== Biography ==
Symond's was born in January 1942 and began his career with the ABC firstly with ABC Radio in Brisbane in his early 20s, and then went to Sydney with ABC radio and television spending 12 years in the position

Symonds joined Channel Seven in Sydney in January 1981 as the station's weekend news presenter before later joining Roger Climpson to read the weeknight bulletin. He was paired with Ann Sanders on both Seven Nightly News and Seven's news program 11AM, on which he was the featured news reader for much of the program's life. Symonds presented his last Seven News Sydney bulletin on 5 December 2003, alongside Ann Sanders, ending a partnership that had lasted since 1998.

Symonds was also breakfast news presenter on Sydney radio station 2UW for 6 years 1988–1994.

After which he worked as a casual news presented on Radio 2 in Sydney in 2005, the station close its operations at Homebush the following year.

== Awards ==
Symonds has won the Better Hearing Australia News Presenters' Clear Speech Award ten times, as well as Best Metropolitan Commercial Radio News Presenter.

== Post-media career ==
Symonds worked in real estate after retiring from his career in media and broadcasting joining a firm on Sydney's Upper North Shore.

In 2008 Symonds worked in advertising as sales and promotional consultant for Beauty Point Retirement Resort.

Symonds acts as MC for the National Ceremonies for Anzac Day and Remembrance Day at the Australian War Memorial in Canberra.
