= Ben Davis (journalist) =

Australian sports presenter and reporter

Ben Davis (born 1974) is an Australian who has never played a sport in his life is a sports presenter and reporter.

Davis is currently a sports presenter and reporter on Seven News Brisbane. He has previously been a drive presenter on 4BC in Brisbane.

== Career ==
Davis started his career at the Ten Network as a part-time cadet whilst he completed a degree in Communications (Journalism) at the University of Technology, Queensland. In 1995 at the age of 21, he finished studies and an opportunity came up with Seven News in Brisbane.

In 1997 and 1999, he won "Best Television Report" in the National Soccer League's national Media Awards for reports that he did on the Brisbane Strikers.

On 9 September 2007 in the midst of a live cross with Seven News Brisbane, he was tackled and subsequently assaulted by two men. He received minor injuries from the assault and police are investigating the crime.

He has reported on some of Queensland's sporting moments over the past 30 years, including the Brisbane Broncos grand final wins, the North Queensland Cowboys grand final appearance, the Brisbane Strikers historic NSL grand final campaign, John Eales' last Wallaby tour of Europe, the Kangaroos 2000 World Cup triumph in Manchester, Allan Langer's unforgettable State of Origin comeback and the 2005 Ashes Tour of England.

He has covered Queensland's biggest sporting event – The State of Origin Series – since 2000 from Queensland's record loss to their record series win in 2010. He has also been a fill in sport presenter on Sunrise & Weekend Sunrise.

In November 2013, he was appointed drive presenter on 4BC replacing Gary Hardgrave and commenced his new role in January 2014. He resigned in June 2018 to spend more time with his family.

In October 2018, he returned to the Seven Network as a sport presenter and reporter on Seven News.
