= Michael Usher =

Australian news presenter

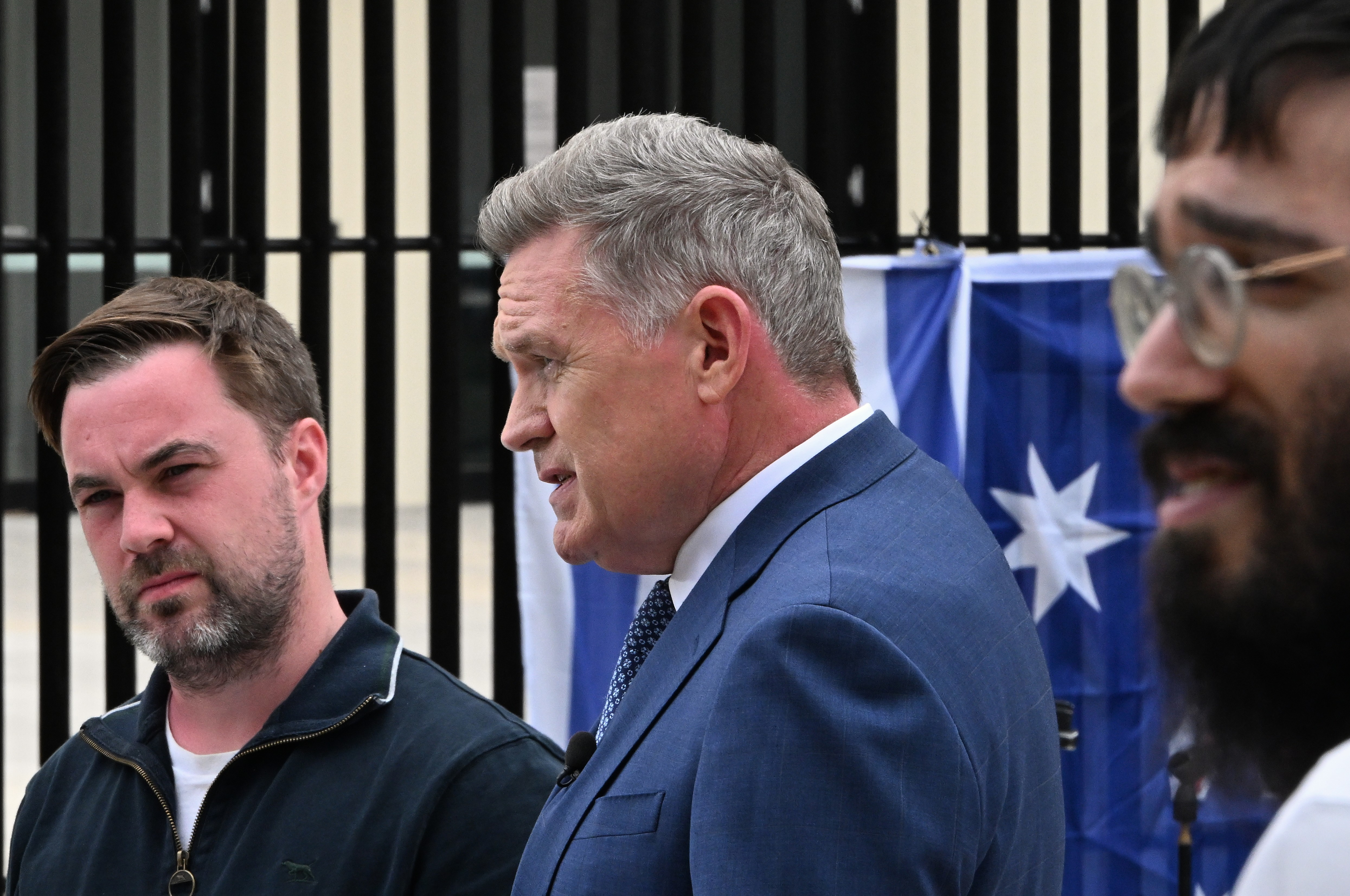
- Michael Usher after massacre at Bondi Beach, December 2025
- Born: 1970; Rockhampton, Queensland, Australia
- Education: All Saints' College, Perth; Western Australian Academy of Performing Arts
- Occupations: Television presenter Correspondent
- Years active: 1990–present
- Employer: Seven Network
- Children: 3

Michael Usher is an Australian television presenter and reporter.

Usher is the Chief Network Anchor for the Seven News and presents Seven News Sydney from Thursday to Saturday with Angie Asimus.

== Early life ==
Usher graduated from All Saints' College, Perth in 1987. He went on to study media in 1989 at Western Australian Academy of Performing Arts and graduated with an Associate Diploma in Media Studies.

== Career ==
=== Nine Network ===
Usher's television career began in 1990 at the Golden West Television Network, Bunbury, as a final year cadet journalist. He was then posted to Kalgoorlie before beginning the following year at STW-9, Perth.

In 1993, Usher moved to Sydney and to TCN-9 news. Three years later he was appointed to the role of Nine Network Olympics reporter, leading the Network's coverage of the 1996 Atlanta and 2000 Sydney Olympic Games. He also went to Lausanne to cover the corruption scandal that engulfed the International Olympic Committee. He was the Nine Network's correspondent in New York when the Twin Towers were attacked in September 2001, and less than two years later was in Iraq, travelling north from Kuwait to reach Baghdad the day after the Coalition seized the city.

In 2001, Usher moved to the Nine Network's US bureau, where he worked for three years as National Nine News US correspondent, based in Los Angeles. Usher returned to Australia to fill in as host of Today, then at the beginning of 2004, together with wife Anna and young son, he moved to the UK, to cover the London bureau.

In 2006, Usher returned to Australia and began presenting Nightline, replacing Ellen Fanning. In 2007, Usher became news presenter for the Sunday program. Following the axing of Nightline in July 2008 and Sunday in August 2008, he was appointed presenter of the short-lived Nine News Sunday AM and for the rest of 2008, Usher filled-in on various Nine News bulletins as well as reporting for 60 Minutes, filling in for Tara Brown who was on maternity leave at the time.

Between November 2008 and January 2009, Usher presented the weekend bulletin of Nine News Sydney. This was after the resignation of Mike Munro and before the appointment of former weeknight presenter Mark Ferguson as the permanent weekend presenter. Also from 2009, Usher finished his role as presenter of the Sunday Morning News, as the bulletin was replaced by Weekend Today.

In March 2009, Usher was appointed a permanent reporter for 60 Minutes. He also hosted the first leaders debate between Julia Gillard and Tony Abbott prior to the 2010 Australian Federal Election.

In December 2010, Usher presented A Current Affair while usual fill in presenter Leila McKinnon had a holiday. He also co-hosted the 2010 New Year's Eve Fireworks with Alicia Gorey. In December 2011, Usher filled in for Karl Stefanovic on Today whilst Stefanovic was on holidays.

=== Seven Network ===
In October 2016, Usher joined the Seven Network and replaced Melissa Doyle as weekend presenter on Seven News Sydney.

In December 2020, it was announced Angela Cox would join Usher as co-host of the weekend news bulletin from January 2021, until August 2024 when Cox became partnered with Mark Ferguson on the weeknight bulletins. In October 2024, it was announced that Angie Asimus will join Usher as co-host.

In December 2018, Usher was appointed the presenter of The Latest: Seven News. In February 2024, it was announced that production would shift to Seven's Perth studios from March, resulting in Usher stepping down from the program.

In April 2026, it was announced that Mark Ferguson and Angela Cox would reduce their workload to 4 days a week presenting Seven News Sydney from Sunday to Wednesday, with Usher and Angie Asimus presenting from Thursday to Saturday.
