= Mike Amor =

Australian journalist and news presenter

- Born: 1967 or 1968 (age 58–59)
- Occupations: Journalist; Newsreader
- Employer: Seven News
- Spouse: Tracy Amor (married 2002–present)
- Children: 1
- Website: mikeamor.com

Mike Amor is an Australian journalist and news presenter.

Amor was the presenter of Seven News Melbourne on weekends and Seven Afternoon News in Melbourne. Previously, he was the network's US Bureau Chief for almost two decades based in Los Angeles and was on the ground in New York City on the day of 9/11.

== Career ==
Amor was United States Bureau Chief for Seven News, based in Los Angeles for 17 years. He won the Edward R Murrow National Award in the Breaking News category for his report of the rescue of a toddler after the Haiti earthquake and has been nominated for two Australian Logies, winning in 2008 for his report on the Garuda plane crash in Indonesia.

In a career spanning 25 years, Amor has covered many of the biggest stories in the world. He was on the ground in New York during the 11 September attacks, helped rescue Australian tourists trapped in New Orleans after Hurricane Katrina, and led Seven's coverage for three US elections, including Barack Obama's win in 2008. He also covered the Libyan rebellion, the Gaza war, and two Fijian coups.

In July 2006, Amor was appointed presenter of Seven 4.30 News, replacing Rebecca Maddern. His tenure was brief, and he was later succeeded by Samantha Armytage before returning to the U.S. bureau.

Amor won two awards at the 2015 Southern California Journalism Awards for two Seven News reports. In the same year, he was awarded the LA Press Club's American National Arts & Entertainment Journalism Award for coverage of the death of Robin Williams.

In August 2018, it was announced that Amor would move back to Australia after 17 years as United States Bureau Chief to replace Jennifer Keyte as weekend presenter of Seven News Melbourne. He was also appointed Seven Afternoon News presenter. Ashlee Mullany replaced Amor as United States Bureau Chief. Amor regularly fills in for Peter Mitchell on Seven News Melbourne.

In October 2026, it was announced that Amor would be leaving Seven News Melbourne after three decades with the network. Following his departure, Karina Carvalho will continue to present weekends solo.

== Controversy ==
On 12 January 2022, leaked footage of Amor alongside co-anchor Rebecca Maddern revealed Amor referring to Serbian tennis player Novak Djokovic as an "arsehole" in an off-air conversation. The conversation was sparked by Djokovic's recent release from detention by the Federal Circuit and Family Court of Australia.

== Personal life ==
Amor married his wife Tracy in December 2002. They have a son who was adopted at birth in the US in 2007.

Amor was diagnosed with glaucoma in his 20s. He has been an ambassador for the charity Glaucoma Australia since 2024.
