= Ann Sanders =

Australian television news presenter (born 1960)

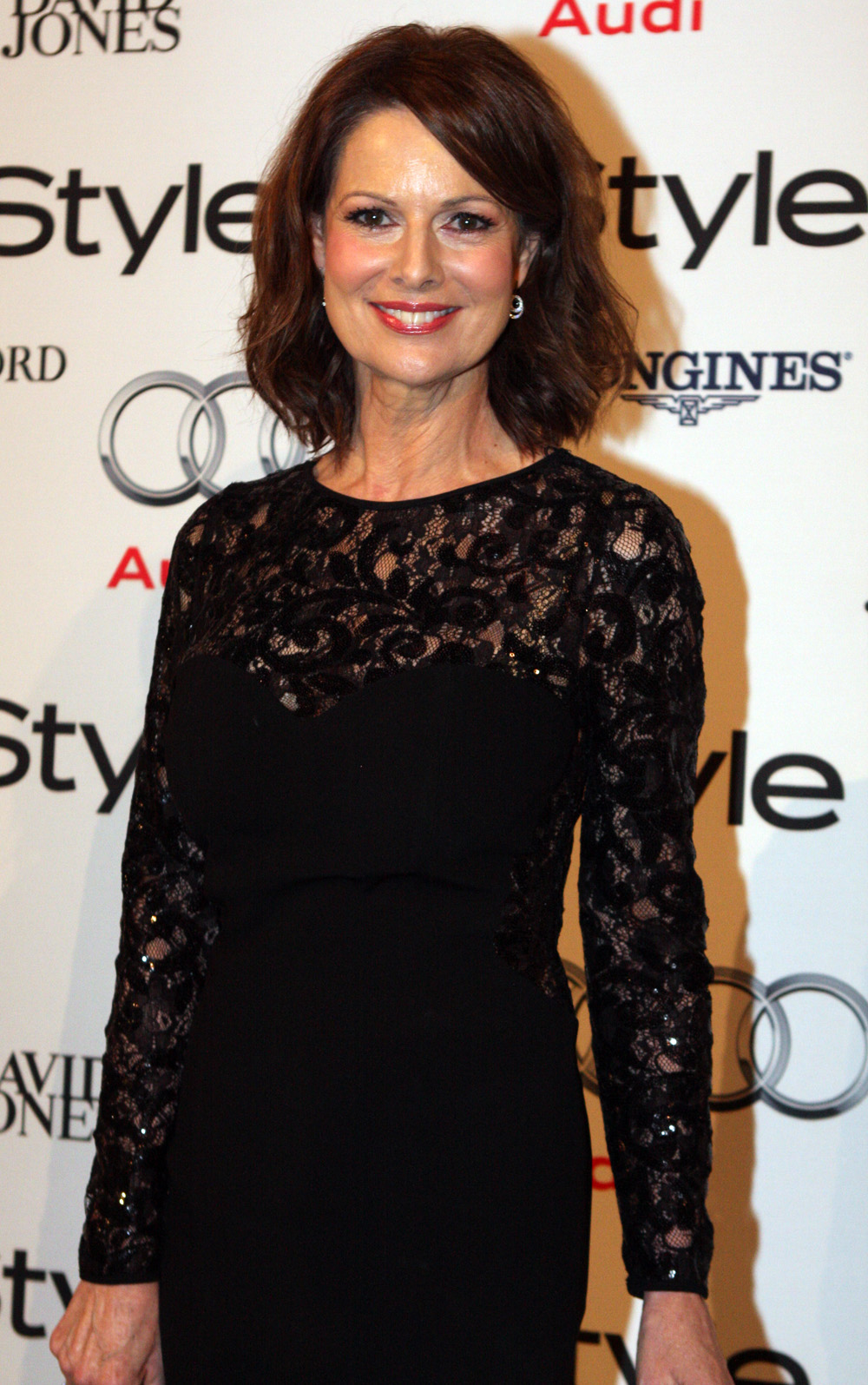
- Sanders at the Women of Style Awards in 2013
- Born: 15 March 1960 (age 66); Sydney, New South Wales, Australia
- Occupations: Journalist, news presenter
- Years active: 1980–present
- Organization: Seven Network
- Television: Seven News
- Title: Seven News presenter
- Children: 2
- Awards: Logie Award, Most Popular Female TV Personality, Western Australia (1981) Logie Award, Most Popular Female TV Personality, Western Australia (1982) Better Hearing Association's Clear Speech Award

Ann Sanders (born 15 March 1960) is an Australian television journalist and news presenter.

Sanders currently presents Seven Afternoon News Sydney from Monday to Thursday.

== Career ==
Sanders began her broadcasting career with SAS-7 in Adelaide, South Australia as a weather presenter before moving to Seven Perth. During this time she won two consecutive (1981/1982) Logie Awards for Most Popular Female Personality in Western Australia. She moved to Sydney in 1983 to join Network Ten as a consumer reporter and news presenter before returning to the Seven Network as a news presenter in 1988.

Sanders joined the national morning news program 11AM in 1990 and travelled to Chernobyl, reporting on the radiation fall-out disaster. Sanders started presenting the weeknight edition of Seven News Sydney in 1995, before being joined by Ross Symonds in 1998 until she moved to weekends in 2004. She stayed until May 2006 when she swapped roles with Chris Bath to present Seven Morning News (now Seven National News at Noon).

Sanders was in Thredbo at the scene of the landslide disaster in 1997 and collected a Logie Award on behalf of the Seven News team for coverage of the event. Other major stories she has covered include the funeral of Diana, Princess of Wales in London; the Port Arthur massacre in Tasmania and the Waterfall train disaster. She was also involved in Federal and State election coverages and the Sydney Olympics in 2000 for Seven News.

Sanders previously presented hourly news updates on The Morning Show with Kylie Gillies and Larry Emdur from 2007 until 2015. Ryan Phelan replaced her due to her taking on Seven Afternoon News.

Sanders has filled in for Natalie Barr on Sunrise. She is also a fill-in presenter for Seven News Sydney. She previously hosted the national Seven Afternoon News bulletin at 4pm, before it was replaced by state-based bulletins in 2017. Sanders continues to host the local Sydney edition of this bulletin on Mondays to Thursdays, with Sally Bowrey presenting on Fridays.

In January 2025, Sanders was replaced as the presenter of the reformatted Seven National News at Noon by Natarsha Belling.

== Personal life ==
Sanders is patron of The Children's Music Foundation, is on the women's advisory committee for the National Breast Cancer Centre, and is an ambassador for Osteoporosis Australia.

She is married to the orthopaedic surgeon Andrew Strokon. The couple lives in Hunters Hill.
