= Seven News =

Australian television news service

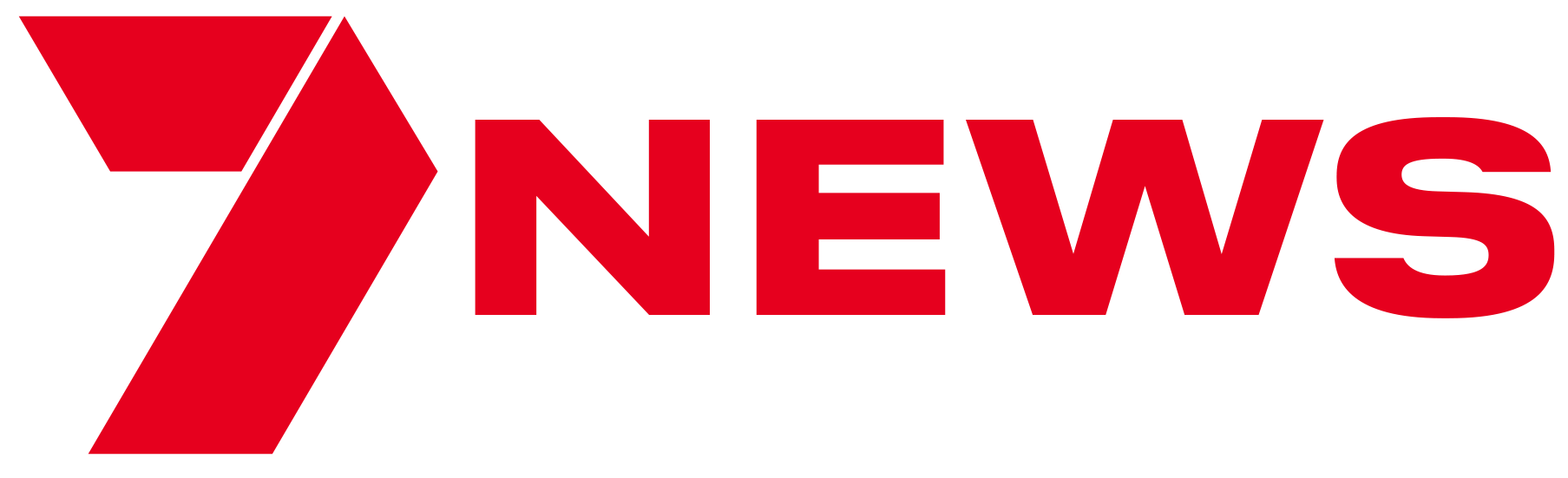
- Division of: Seven Network
- Opening Theme: "The Mission" by John Williams (1988–present)
- Founded: 1958; 68 years ago
- Headquarters: South Eveleigh, Sydney, New South Wales
- Area served: Nationwide
- Formerly called: Australian Television News (ATVN) (1963–1970); Seven National News (1970–1988); Seven Nightly News (1988–2000)
- Broadcast programs: Sunrise; Weekend Sunrise; Sunrise Early News; Seven Afternoon News; Seven News at 5; Seven News; Seven News: Spotlight
- Parent: Seven Media Group
- Website: 7news.com.au

Seven News (stylised 7NEWS) is the television news service of the Seven Network and, as of 2021, the highest-rated show in Australia.

National bulletins are presented from Seven's high definition studios in South Eveleigh, Sydney, while its flagship 6 pm statewide bulletins are produced in studios based in Sydney, Melbourne, Brisbane, Adelaide, Perth and Hobart. The network also produces weeknight local news bulletins for regional markets in Queensland, New South Wales (including the ACT), Victoria and Western Australia.

It draws upon the resources of ITN, NBC, CBC, CNN, APTN and Reuters for select international coverage.

== History ==
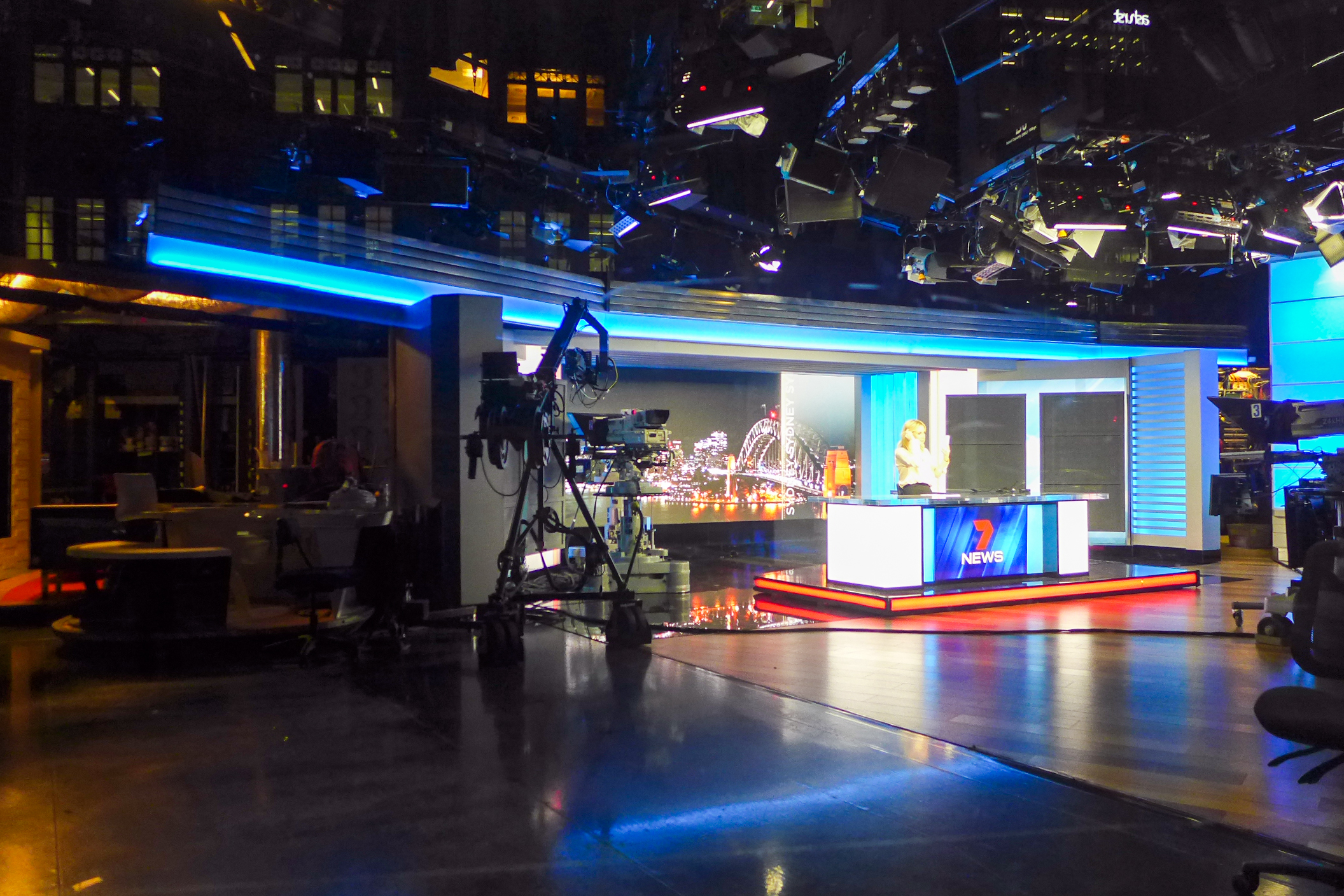
From late 2004 to 2023, most national bulletins and Seven News Sydney had been presented from studios in Martin Place

Seven News — previously known as ATVN News, Channel Seven News, Seven Eyewitness News, Seven National News and Seven Nightly News — is one of Australia's longest-running television news services, founded in 1958, along with Nine News on the rival Nine Network.

In 2003, former Nine Network news and current affairs chief Peter Meakin was appointed to Seven News, tasked with lifting ratings in the struggling east coast markets by including more local content in those bulletins.

Seven News has been the top rating news service nationally for all but three years since 2005, partly attributed to the success of television game show Deal or No Deal (and later The Chase Australia), which provided the flagship 6pm bulletin with a significant lead-in audience.

In recent years, under the guidance of former longtime National Nine News chief Peter Meakin, Seven's news and current affairs division has produced more locally focused content, which has been lifting ratings for key markets such as Sydney and Melbourne. Since February 2005, the ratings of Deal or No Deal, Seven News and Today Tonight have gradually increased. Seven News was the highest-rating news service nationally in both the 2005 and 2006 ratings seasons. A key aspect of Seven's recent ratings dominance in news and current affairs has been attributed to Deal or No Deal's (and, since late 2015, The Chase Australia's) top rating audience, which provides Seven News with a large lead-in audience. Between 2007 and 2010 inclusive, Seven News completed a clean sweep across the five capital cities in terms of being the most watched 6 pm news bulletin. On 5 July 2008, Channel Seven introduced a watermark on news and current affairs programmes.

In 2007, Seven News beat National Nine News and Ten News in ratings for the first time in the Melbourne market. During the year, they ranked highest twenty weeks compared to Nine's nineteen weeks, while one week was tied. Previously, in 2006, Seven had ranked on top 16 weeks in while Nine had 24 weeks on top in Melbourne.

During 2008, from weeknight to weeknight, Seven and Nine had similar ratings, often changing the most popular show from night to night. As of 2013, Nine News retains a national lead, although Seven still has a tight grip on the Adelaide and Perth bulletins. In November 2012, Peter Meakin resigned as director of news and current affairs of the Seven Network after nine years in the role, with Rob Raschke named as his successor.

In October 2013, it was announced that the Saturday 6pm bulletins would be extended to one hour, likely as a reaction to Nine News regaining its national lead in 2013.

On Monday 20 January 2014, the news theme was overhauled with the traditional The Mission piece removed after two decades, however, due to viewer backlash, The Mission was reinstated on Friday 24 January 2014.

In February 2014, Today Tonight was axed in the Sydney, Melbourne and Brisbane markets and the news bulletins were extended to one hour. The Adelaide and Perth bulletins remained at 30 minutes with Today Tonight being retained in only those two markets.

In 2015, Seven News suffered its worst ratings year for over a decade, with all three of its east coast bulletins, as well as its regional Queensland bulletins, languishing behind Nine News and its Adelaide bulletin also starting to lose to Nine on weeknights. However, Seven News soon reclaimed the lead nationally the following year, aided by the new game show lead-in The Chase Australia, which helped to increase numbers in Sydney and Melbourne, as well as a narrow 3,000 viewer loss to Nine in Brisbane.

In July 2016, a new locally focused bulletin for the Gold Coast was introduced, airing at 5.30pm every evening from the network's Surfers Paradise studios. The debut bulletin won its timeslot with 49,000, compared to the rival Nine Gold Coast News which drew 34,000 viewers. Although the Seven bulletin became the ratings leader in 2019, the rival service from Nine went onto regain its lead

In November 2019, the Adelaide and Perth editions of Today Tonight were axed, finally bringing their nightly news shows to an hour edition in line with the east coast.

In 2023, Seven News in Sydney began to vacate its previous Martin Place studios, with all national and state-based operations for New South Wales transferred to Seven's news facility in South Eveleigh. From 26 June 2023, it began broadcasting from a purpose-built studio at the Australian Technology Park. The new space is five times larger than Martin Place, allows for permanent sets for all programs, with two complete control rooms and more than 40sq m of LED screens, while all newsroom operations are located on a second entire floor.

In July 2024, Seven added a horoscope segment to its nightly evening news bulletin as well as a satirical news segment titled The 6:57 News at the end of its Friday bulletin hosted by Mark Humphries. The segments were added to explore "new ideas and concepts to bring in new audiences". The horoscope segment, which was widely derided by viewers, was removed in December 2024, while The 6:57 News was also reported not to return in 2025, though Humphries will remain with the network.

In November 2024, Seven's local Gold Coast news bulletin, airing at 5.30pm on weeknights, was axed.

Following Seven West Media's acquisition of Southern Cross Austereo's Seven affiliated stations, 7 Tasmania Nightly News was rebranded as 7NEWS Tasmania on 6 October 2025 bringing the programme in line with other 7NEWS bulletins. The bulletin continued to be produced from the TNT Launceston studios until 25 May 2026 when studio presentation was relocated to the Southern Cross Austereo studios in Hobart, with transmission controlled from Seven’s studios in Canberra, ending six decades of Launceston based production.

== National bulletins ==
=== Sunrise Early News ===
Sunrise Early News airs at 5 am on weekdays and is presented by Edwina Bartholomew (Monday – Wednesday), and Monique Wright (Thursday and Friday), and includes news, business, finance, sport and weather. It airs from Seven's Eveleigh studios. Fill in presenters include Shaun White, Teegan Dolling and Sally Bowrey. The bulletin is followed by Sunrise.

The bulletin first aired on 14 July 2008 as Seven Early News, presented by Natalie Barr, with sport presented by Mark Beretta. Simon Reeve presented the first bulletin as Barr was guest-cohosting Sunrise at the time.

In January 2016, it was announced that Jodie Speers would replace Natalie Barr and Mark Beretta due to Sunrise starting at 5:30am. The bulletin also moved to the earlier time of 5am.

In March 2024, Jodie Speers announced her resignation from the Seven Network. The bulletin was renamed Sunrise Early News and Speers was replaced by Edwina Bartholomew.

=== Seven's National News ===
Seven's National News (stylized 7 National News) is a national bulletin that airs at 12 pm on weekdays and is presented by rotating presenters from Seven's Eveleigh studios. Sport is presented by Alex Cullen on Monday and Tuesday and Kate Massey from Wednesday to Friday and weather is presented by certified meteorologist Tony Auden on Monday and Tuesday and Gertie Spurling or Sarah Cumming from Wednesday to Friday.

The bulletin was previously known as Seven Morning News and had been presented by Garry Wilkinson, Chris Reason, Chris Bath, Ann Sanders and Sally Bowrey. In 2006, Bath and Sanders swapped roles with Bath being appointed weekend presenter on Seven News Sydney and Sanders appointed presenter of Seven Morning News.

Separate editions for the Adelaide and Perth markets were launched in 2021.

In January 2025, the bulletin underwent significant changes: it was rescheduled to midday, extended to a full hour, and rebranded as Seven's National News at Noon. Natarsha Belling was announced as the new presenter, succeeding Ann Sanders. Additionally, the local editions in Adelaide and Perth were discontinued.

In June 2026, Natarsha Belling was made redundant as part of a major restructure following the merger of Southern Cross Austereo and Seven West Media, which resulted in significant job cuts across the organisation.

Fill-in presenters for the bulletin include Chris Reason, Sally Bowrey, Hugh Whitfeld, Paul Kadak, Karina Carvalho and Angie Asimus (news), Tom Sacre, Matt White, Liam Tapper and Theo Doropoulos (sport) and Casey Treloar, Laura Dymock, Anna McGraw, and Angelique Opie (weather).

The 'At Noon' tag was dropped from the on-air bulletin name in September 2025, though it remains on EPGs & 7plus.

=== Seven News with Alex Cullen ===
Seven News with Alex Cullen airs at 1 pm, 2 pm and 3 pm on weekdays and is presented by Alex Cullen from the Seven's Collins Street studios in Melbourne. It debuted as part of the new programming block Winning Arvo on 22 September 2025.

=== Seven Afternoon News (Summer edition) ===
The Summer edition of Seven Afternoon News is a national edition presented from Seven's Eveleigh studio and previously from its Martin Place studio. The bulletin airs when local editions are on break and is presented by Ann Sanders (Monday – Thursday) and Sally Bowrey (Friday).

This bulletin is a semi-national bulletin because it airs across Australia, except in South Australia and Western Australia who have their own local 4 pm News.

Fill-in presenters include Alex Cullen, Angie Asimus, Hugh Whitfield, Chris Reason, Angela Cox and Blake Johnson (News).

Seven's national afternoon bulletin was introduced in 2003 as Target Iraq, during extensive coverage of the 2003 invasion of Iraq, and presented from Sydney by David Johnston. The bulletin was retained after the initial invasion and moved production to Melbourne and was subsequently reformatted as the Seven 4.30 News. Johnston retired in September 2005 and was succeeded by Rebecca Maddern until production returned to Sydney in July 2006. Former US correspondent Mike Amor took over as anchor, but was replaced three months later by Samantha Armytage. On 3 December 2010, the bulletin was extended to 60 minutes and began to feature a sports bulletin. However, on 7 May 2012, the bulletin was truncated back to 30 minutes as The Price is Right returned to the 5:00 pm timeslot.

On 2 April 2012, a 30-minute Perth edition was launched, airing as a cutaway half-hour bulletin at 4:30pm, following the first half-hour of the national bulletin at 4pm. Regional and Remote Western Australia did not receive the 4.30 afternoon news on Seven Regional WA, rather, the network substituted it with its own local news service at 5:30pm.

In December 2012, the bulletin was renamed as Seven Afternoon News. In January 2013, the bulletin was again extended to an hour due to the axing of The Price Is Right and production moved back to the Melbourne studio with Rebecca Maddern replacing Samantha Armytage.

In August 2013, Maddern was replaced by Melissa Doyle and Matt White and the bulletin was brought forward to start at 4 pm.

In April 2014, Matt White resigned from the Seven Network to return to Network Ten. Doyle continued as the solo presenter until July 2015, when she was replaced by Ann Sanders. Doyle subsequently took over as Seven News Sydney weekend presenter from Chris Bath.

Between 2015 and 2017, the national bulletin was gradually replaced by local editions presented from Melbourne, Brisbane, Adelaide and Perth. The last incarnation of the national bulletin was broadcast from the network's Martin Place studios and was presented by Ann Sanders (Monday – Thursday) and Chris Reason (Friday). Sport was presented by Mel McLaughlin (Monday) and Jim Wilson (Tuesday – Friday) and weather was presented by David Brown (Monday – Thursday) and Amelia Mulcahy or Angie Asimus (Friday).

=== Seven News Updates ===
Short localised updates are presented during the afternoons by various state-based reporters and eventually presenters and evenings by the state-based presenters.

When breaking stories occur, newsflashes are presented from Seven's Eveleigh studio or Seven Melbourne's national broadcast centre.

=== Seven News at 5 ===
Seven News at 5 airs at 5 pm every Saturday and Sunday and is presented by Hugh Whitfeld (Saturday) and TBA (Sunday), which includes news, sport, finance and weather. Sport is presented by Matt White (Saturday) and Mel McLaughlin (Sunday). It airs from Seven's Sydney studios. The bulletin does not air on a Sunday in Melbourne, Adelaide and Perth during the AFL season. Seven's affiliate in Tasmania airs the bulletin on tape delay at 5:30 pm right before the main bulletin at 6 pm.

The bulletin first aired on 1 March 2015 as a 'Special Presentation' until it became permanent on 29 March 2015. Fill-in presenters include Karina Carvalho, Michael Usher, Angie Asimus, Angela Cox, Sally Bowrey, Paul Kadak, Katrina Blowers, Hugh Whitfield, Teegan Dolling, Liam Tapper, Chris Reason, Blake Johnson, Jerrie Demasi, Elspeth Hussey and Gertie Spurling.

Since 2021, Adelaide has received its edition of Seven News at 5, locally regarded as the 'Early Edition'. It is presented by Elspeth Hussey, Gertie Spurling, and Casey Treloar, respectively. Bruce Abernethy presents sport. Occasionally, the Adelaide team present the national 5 pm bulletin.

== Capital-based bulletins ==
=== Afternoon news ===
Hour–long local editions of Seven Afternoon News were launched periodically in the capital cities, replacing the previous national bulletin in full. Melbourne and Brisbane launched local afternoon bulletins in August 2015. In July 2017, Adelaide launched their own local edition, while the previously half-hour Perth bulletin was extended to replace the national bulletin in full. At this time, the national bulletin was replaced by a Sydney bulletin.

Presently, Seven Afternoon News is aired at 4 pm on weekdays in five separate local editions:

- The Sydney edition is broadcast from the network's Eveleigh studios in Sydney and is presented by Ann Sanders (Monday – Thursday) and Sally Bowrey or Hugh Whitfeld (Friday), with sport presented by Mel McLaughlin (Monday – Thursday) and Matt White (Friday), and weather presented by Angelique Opie (Monday, Thursday and Friday) and Angie Asimus (Tuesday and Wednesday). Fill-in presenters include Angie Asimus, Sally Bowrey, Hugh Whitfeld, Chris Reason and Paul Kadak (News), Matt White, David Woiwod, Tom Sacre, Liam Tapper and Jelisa Apps (Sport), and Paul Kadak and Angelique Opie (Weather). The local edition simulcasts across New South Wales and the Australian Capital Territory through Seven-owned regional stations CBN and NEN.
- The Melbourne edition is broadcast from the network's Docklands studios in Melbourne and is presented by Karina Carvalho (Monday and Tuesday) and Laura Turner (Wednesday – Friday), with sport presented by Rebecca Maddern, and weather presented by meteorologist Jane Bunn. Fill-in presenters include Laura Turner and Blake Johnson (News), Theo Doropoulos and Kate Massey (Sport) and Tyra Stowers and Melina Sarris (Weather). The local edition simulcasts across Victoria and New South Wales/South Australian border areas through Seven's AMV and PTV, as well as Tasmania through ex-SCA and now Seven-owned TNT.
- The state-based Queensland edition is broadcast from the network's Mount Coot-tha studios in Brisbane and is presented by Katrina Blowers (Monday – Wednesday) and Samantha Heathwood (Thursday and Friday), with sport presented by Steve Titmus (Monday – Wednesday) and Ben Davis (Thursday and Friday), and weather presented by meteorologist Tony Auden (Monday – Thursday) and Michelle Jensen (Friday). Fill-in presenters include Marlina Whop, Max Futcher and Amanda Abate (News), Ben Davis (Sport) and Laura Dymock (Weather). Initially launched as a separate 90-minute bulletin in the South East Queensland region (Brisbane and surrounding areas received by BTQ transmitters), it is now simulcast across the state via Seven Queensland and across central and remote areas of eastern Australia on Seven Central. It is also being aired in Darwin, Northern Territory through Seven owned and operated station TND where it broadcasts live into all relevant time zones, thus ending the bulletin at 4:30pm in Darwin. The Gold Coast also receives this bulletin in full as well, since the axing of the local Gold Coast news service on 21 November 2024. Prior to this, from 4 July 2016, the bulletin ended at 4:30pm due to the local Gold Coast news at 5:30pm. On 10 August 2017, two years to the day since the bulletin launched, the local service claimed victory in the 4:00 pm timeslot, winning 21 weeks to the rival Nine Live Queensland's two weeks.
- The Adelaide edition is broadcast from the network's Hindmarsh studios and is presented by Elspeth Hussey (Monday and Tuesday) and Gertie Spurling or Sarah Cumming (Wednesday – Friday), with sport presented by Tom Wilson or Andrew Hayes, and weather presented by Casey Treloar. It is simulcast across South Australia through WIN Television SA and Seven GTS/BKN. On 26 June 2020, the local Adelaide afternoon news formerly presented by Rosanna Mangiarelli was axed due to budget cuts, with that market receiving the Melbourne edition until 23 October. At the time, Adelaide received a local insert in the last segment of the bulletin, presented by a local state based presenter, and a localised weather update with Amelia Mulcahy. The bulletin was later reinstated on 26 October, but the axing affected Seven News in the Adelaide ratings, and helped rival Nine News to close the afternoon and evening news gap with Seven ever since. A midday Seven News bulletin is also produced and broadcast on radio station FIVEaa as of 2023.
- The Perth edition is broadcast from the network's Osborne Park studios in Perth and is presented by Samantha Jolly, who also present weather and sport is presented by Ryan Daniels. Unlike the former breakaway, the bulletin runs for a full hour. In regional WA, the bulletin ends at 4:30 pm, due to its weeknight regional bulletin at 5:30 pm. Fill-in presenters include Tim McMillan, Jerrie Demasi, Elizabeth Creasy, and Amelia Broun (News).

=== Nightly news ===
==== Sydney ====
Seven News Sydney reporter Jessica Ridley reporting outside the Australian Broadcasting Corporation's Ultimo studios in Sydney, New South Wales.

Seven News Sydney is directed by Geoff Dunn and presented by Mark Ferguson and Angela Cox from Sunday to Wednesday and Michael Usher and Angie Asimus from Thursday to Saturday from Seven's headquarters, located at Eveleigh. Sport is presented by Mel McLaughlin from Sunday to Thursday and Matt White on Friday and Saturday. Weather is presented by Angie Asimus on Tuesday and Wednesday and Angelique Opie from Thursday to Monday.

The Sydney bulletin is simulcast to Seven-owned regional transmitters in New South Wales and Australian Capital Territory.

After decades of trailing Nine News Sydney and 10 News Sydney in the ratings, which led to the sackings of Ross Symonds and Ann Sanders as the weeknight presenters in 2003, Seven News Sydney's attempts to boost ratings began in December with the appointment of Ian Ross as main weeknight anchor and the relocation of the bulletin, and other national bulletins, to new street-level studios in Martin Place in August 2004, thus allowing bystanders to watch bulletins being broadcast live. After two years of presenting the national morning news, Chris Bath returned to her former role as weekend news presenter in 2006, swapping roles with Ann Sanders. Ross presented his final bulletin for Seven News Sydney on Friday 27 November 2009. Bath took over as main weeknight presenter from Monday 30 November 2009 while former Nine News presenter Mark Ferguson took over as weekend presenter on Saturday 28 November 2009.

The bulletin retained its ratings lead until 2011, when it lost to the rival Nine News bulletin for the first time in seven years.

In January 2014, Mark Ferguson was appointed weeknight presenter, replacing Chris Bath due to poor ratings. Bath became weekend presenter and continued to host Sunday Night until her resignation in July 2015, after which Melissa Doyle took over. More changes to Sydney's news presenting team in subsequent months saw former Melbourne weather presenter David Brown replace Sarah Cumming as the Sunday to Thursday weather presenter, Mel McLaughlin replace Jim Wilson as the Sunday to Thursday sports presenter and Wilson replace Ryan Phelan as the Friday to Saturday sports presenter.

In August 2016, it was announced that Michael Usher would replace Melissa Doyle as Friday and Saturday presenter. Doyle moved into a new expanded role as senior correspondent and host of Sunday Night.

In June 2020, Jim Wilson left Seven after 28 years with the network, to become a new host of 2GB's Drive program. His last sports bulletin was 27 June 2020. It was later announced that Matt Shirvington would replace him.

In November 2020, David Brown left the Sydney newsroom to return to Melbourne with Angie Asimus promoted to weeknight weather presenter.

In December 2020, it was announced that Angela Cox would be joining Michael Usher as co-anchor of the weekend bulletin from January 2021.

In June 2023, Matt Shirvington stepped down from his role of weekend sports presenter, to take up his new role as co-host of Sunrise. Matt Carmichael was announced as his replacement.

In September 2024, it was announced that Angela Cox would be joining Mark Ferguson as co-anchor of the weeknight bulletin.

In October 2024, it was announced that Angie Asimus would be joining Michael Usher as co-anchor of the weekend bulletin. Asimus would also continue her role as a weather presenter alongside Mark Ferguson and Angela Cox on Tuesday and Wednesday.

In September 2025, it was announced that Matt Carmichael would be leaving Seven News after being axed. He will present his last bulletin at the end of October, after the Bathurst 1000.

In January 2026, it was announced that Matt White would be returning to Seven News Sydney, eleven years after he departed. He presents for both News and Sport, and fronts analysis on NRL coverage across bulletins nationwide each night.

In April 2026, it was announced that Mark Ferguson and Angela Cox would reduce their workload to 4 days a week presenting Seven News Sydney from Sunday to Wednesday, with Michael Usher and Angie Asimus presenting from Thursday to Saturday.

In September 2026, Amber Laidler announced her departure from Seven News Sydney after a decade of service serving 10 years with the network.

Fill-in presenters include Michael Usher, Angie Asimus, Hugh Whitfeld, Chris Reason and Paul Kadak (News), Matt White, David Woiwod, Tom Sacre, Liam Tapper, Johanna Griggs and Jelisa Apps (Sport) and Paul Kadak and Angelique Opie (Weather).

==== Melbourne ====
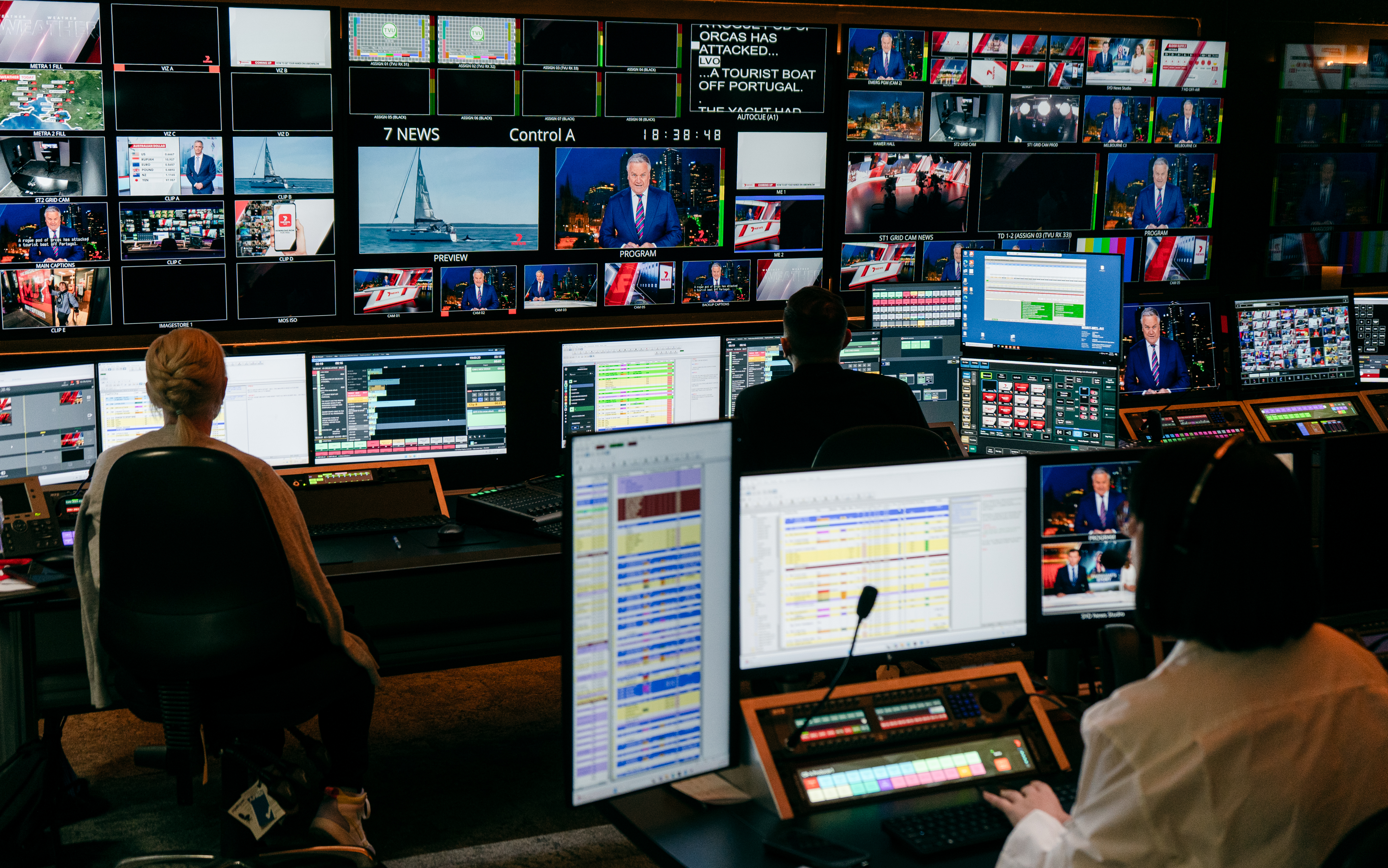
The 7NEWS Melbourne control room during transmission of an evening bulletin.

Seven News Melbourne is directed by Chris Salter and presented by Peter Mitchell from Monday to Thursday and Karina Carvalho from Friday to Sunday from Melbourne Quarter Tower, located at Collins Street, Docklands. Sport is presented by Rebecca Maddern on weeknights and Theo Doropoulos on weekends. Weather is presented by certified meteorologist Jane Bunn on weeknights and Tyra Stowers on weekends.

Peter Mitchell previously held the role of weekend presenter for Seven Nightly News between 1987 and 2000 when he replaced the short-lived presenting duo of David Johnston and Anne Fulwood as weeknight presenter. Jennifer Keyte was appointed as weeknight presenter in 1990, becoming Australia's first solo female primetime commercial news presenter. In a network reshuffle in 1996, Keyte terminated her employment after the Seven Network attempted to pair her with David Johnston, who went to present solo for three years. She returned in 2003, assuming the role as weekend presenter, succeeding Jennifer Adams.

In May 2018, Network Ten announced that Jennifer Keyte would join the network to present Ten Eyewitness News Melbourne replacing Stephen Quartermain. In August 2018, it was announced that Mike Amor will move back to Australia after 17 years as United States Bureau Chief to replace Keyte.

Following decades of coming third in television ratings to Nine News Melbourne and 10 News Melbourne (previously 10 News First, Ten Eyewitness News, Ten News at Five, Ten Evening News and Ten News: First at Five), Seven News Melbourne went into a tight contest to win the ratings battle in 2005. Seven News overtook the rival Nine bulletin in the ratings in 2007. This was subsequently followed by a series of advertisements and promos which have touted Seven News Melbourne as Melbourne's New #1 and Nine altering their promotions to simply say Melbourne's Best News – a throwback to the 1980s when National Nine News Melbourne was being beaten in the ratings by ATV-10's Ten Eyewitness News. As of 2011, Seven has lost its ratings lead at 6 to 9 pm.

Between 2018 and 2021, during the AFL season, Peter Mitchell, Tim Watson, Jane Bunn and the weeknight team would present from Sunday to Thursday and Mike Amor, Jacqueline Felgate, Melina Sarris and the weekend team would present on Friday and Saturday nights.

In January 2022, it was announced that Rebecca Maddern would return to the Seven Network to present Seven News Melbourne on weekends with Mike Amor.

In November 2024, Tim Watson announced that he would be retiring after 30 years with the network from December. It was announced that Rebecca Maddern will step into an expanded role with Seven News Melbourne starting January 2025, as Chief Sports Presenter. In January 2025, it was announced that Karina Carvalho will replace Maddern to present on weekends with Mike Amor.

In October 2026, it was announced that Mike Amor would be leaving Seven News Melbourne after three decades with the network. Following his departure, Karina Carvalho will continue to present weekends solo.

The bulletin is simulcast throughout regional Victoria and New South Wales/South Australia border areas that receive television services from Seven's AMV and PTV (with the NSW Border receiving a trimmed down 30-minute version of the full-hour news on weeknights), and to viewers in Darwin, Northern Territory through Seven's TND During the AFL season, the Saturday edition of Seven News Melbourne airs for only 30 minutes to fit in with the Seven Network's Saturday night AFL coverage.

Fill-in presenters include Karina Carvalho, Laura Turner and Blake Johnson (News), Theo Doropoulos and Kate Massey (Sport) and Melina Sarris, Tyra Stowers and Blake Johnson (Weather).

==== Brisbane ====
Seven News Brisbane is directed by Erin Edwards and presented by Max Futcher and Sarah Greenhalgh on weeknights and Samantha Heathwood on weekends from Seven's Brisbane studios, located at Mount Coot-tha. Sport is presented by Steve Titmus from Sunday to Wednesday and Alissa Smith from Thursday to Saturday. Weather is presented by certified meteorologist Tony Auden from Sunday to Thursday and Michelle Jensen on Friday and Saturday.

The bulletin is also simulcast in Brisbane on local radio station 96.5 Family FM, and across central and remote areas of eastern Australia, on Seven Central. Regional Queensland viewers in the Sunshine Coast, Wide Bay–Burnett, Toowoomba, Rockhampton, Mackay, Townsville and Cairns television markets receive a trimmed down 30-minute version of the newshour on weeknights via Seven Queensland, with a live simulcast on weekends.

Previously, Tracey Challenor presented the weekend news for sixteen years until her resignation in February 2007. Cummins was first appointed to the weekday weather in 2005 after more than a year of the Brisbane bulletin not having a weather presenter; former kids show presenter Tony Johnston had this role in 2003. Cummins was replaced by former Nine weatherman John Schluter in early 2007 and she was moved to weekends. Ghidella joined Seven News in 2007 and replaced Challenor.

In October 2002, Rod Young moved from ABC News in Brisbane to co-anchor with Kay McGrath. She had presented Seven News Brisbane solo for the previous nine months following the retirement of Frank Warrick. Following a couple of lean years coming third to Nine News Brisbane and 10 News Brisbane, Seven News Brisbane regained its ratings lead by 2007, helped by the recruitment of ex-Nine weatherman John Schluter, former Today news presenter Sharyn Ghidella and director of news Rob Raschke. In 2008, Seven News Brisbane was officially the #1 bulletin in Brisbane, winning all 40 ratings weeks. As of 2013, Seven has lost its ratings lead at 6 to 9 pm.

In January 2013, Sharyn Ghidella and Bill McDonald were appointed Sunday to Thursday (later changed to weeknights) presenters with Kay McGrath and Rod Young moving to present on Friday and Saturday (later changed to weekends). It was also announced that Ghidella will present a local edition of Today Tonight, which was axed in January 2014 in favour of the bulletin's one hour extension.

In June 2016, it was announced that Rod Young would leave Seven News Brisbane to present a new local bulletin for Seven News Gold Coast.

In March 2018, McDonald was removed as co-anchor of the bulletin, and was replaced by Max Futcher following poor ratings.

In December 2019, Kay McGrath announced her retirement after 40 years in television and will present her final bulletin on 26 January. Katrina Blowers has been announced as her replacement.

In January 2023, Pat Welsh announced his resignation effective 28 January 2023 as sport presenter after 47 years with the Seven Network, and Ben Davis was announced as his replacement presenting Sport on Thursday through Saturday.

In January 2024, it was announced that Samantha Heathwood will replace Katrina Blowers as weekend news presenter from 3 February. Blowers shares presenting Seven Afternoon News with Heathwood and is a reporter.

In July 2024, Sharyn Ghidella was made redundant after 17 years with the network.

Following a raft of changes to the Brisbane newsroom, in August 2024, after 18 years, Shane Webcke stepped down from his sports presenter role to explore new directions and focus on family interests. Webcke was replaced by Steve Titmus.

In October 2024, it was announced that Sarah Greenhalgh would join Max Futcher as co-anchor of the weekday bulletin from 21 October.

News updates for Brisbane are presented by Max Futcher throughout the afternoon and the early evening. Katrina Blowers and Samantha Heathwood are fill-in presenters for the bulletin. Ben Davis, Rohan Welsh, and Alissa Smith are fill-in sports presenters and Laura Dymock is the fill-in weather presenter.

==== Adelaide ====
Seven News Adelaide is directed by Mark Mooney and presented by Rosanna Mangiarelli and Will Goodings on weeknights and Mike Smithson on weekends from Seven's Adelaide studios, located at Hindmarsh. Sport is presented by Mark Soderstrom on weeknights and Bruce Abernethy on weekends. Weather is presented by Casey Treloar on weeknights and Gertie Spurling on weekends.

The Adelaide bulletin is simulcast to the regional areas of South Australia on Seven's GTS/BKN in the Spencer Gulf region and Broken Hill in New South Wales, and through WIN South Australia in the Riverland and Mount Gambier/South East regions of the state.

From 1989 to 2004, Graeme Goodings presented Seven News Adelaide on weeknights with Jane Doyle until he was diagnosed with bowel cancer. Goodings and Riddell, the then weekend news presenter, agreed to swap roles, allowing for Goodings' rehabilitation. Goodings left Seven News Adelaide in December 2014, after 34 years as a TV newsreader.

Prior to 27 December 1987, the presenters and production crew of Seven News Adelaide produced 10 News Adelaide (then known as Ten Eyewitness News). However, as the television industry was consolidating in Australia, these news services had each become associated by ownership with inter-state news services being broadcast on opposite frequencies; therefore, to simplify network interaction, their respective networks agreed to swap channel assignments and network affiliations in Adelaide.

In December 2007, production of Seven News moved from studios located at Gilberton to a new purpose-built space at Hindmarsh.

During the AFL season, Seven News Adelaide does not air at the regular time on Saturday or Sunday if there is a twilight match involving Adelaide and/or Port Adelaide, in which case, a shortened edition is broadcast at half time, replacing analysis of the AFL matches broadcast, or a full bulletin is broadcast immediately after the game.

In 2014, Seven News Adelaide won every single ratings weeknight against the rival Nine News Adelaide, but in 2015 started to lose some nights to Nine as Seven News as a whole suffered its worst ratings figures for over a decade. It clocked up 500 consecutive weekly ratings wins in March 2019, extending a streak which started in August 2006.

In August 2019, Jane Doyle celebrated 30 years of reading the news on Seven.

In November 2019, John Riddell announced his retirement and presented his last bulletin on 6 December. Doyle became solo presenter after Ridell's retirement.

In June 2020, it was announced that Jessica Adamson and Tim Noonan were made redundant. The weekday 4pm bulletin was also retired with Melbourne's bulletin broadcast to the Adelaide market. Rosanna Mangiarelli replaced Adamson on weekends. The bulletin was later reinstated on 26 October, but the axing affected Seven News in the Adelaide ratings, and helped rival Nine News to close the afternoon and evening news gap with Seven ever since.

In September 2022, it was announced that FIVEAA's Will Goodings would replace Mike Smithson to co-host weekends.

In November 2022, it was announced that Jane Doyle would retire from television after more than three decades presenting 7NEWS Adelaide. Will Goodings and Rosanna Mangiarelli were announced as her replacement, commencing from January 2023.

Fill-in presenters include Mike Smithson, Sarah Cumming, Gertie Spurling and Elspeth Hussey (News), Bruce Abernethy, Tom Wilson and Andrew Hayes (Sport) and Sarah Cumming, Gertie Spurling, Emily Beaton and Hanni Howe (Weather). News updates are presented by presenters or fill-in presenters.

As of 2020, Seven has remained South Australia's number one Adelaide news service for more than a decade.

==== Perth ====
Seven News Perth is directed by Christien de Garis and presented by Tim McMillan and Angela Tsun from Sunday to Wednesday and Rick Ardon and Susannah Carr from Thursday to Saturday from Seven and West Australian Newspaper studios, located at Osborne Park. Sport is presented by Ryan Daniels on weeknights and Adrian Barich on weekends. Weather is presented by Samantha Jolly on weeknights and Jerrie Demasi on weekends. Seven News Perth is also simulcast to Seven-owned transmitters across regional and remote areas of Western Australia. It was also formerly simulcast on Curtin FM 100.1 in the Perth CBD area.

Yvette Mooney served as a weekend news presenter until she was diagnosed with breast cancer in 2007 and subsequently left the network in June 2008. Long standing Seven News Perth presenter Jeff Newman announced his retirement from television on 1 July 2009, and retired from his role on Monday 10 August 2009. He was replaced by former Nine News Perth weather presenter Natalia Cooper, who began her new role during September 2009. Cooper resigned from Seven Perth at the end of 2012 with ex-Nine weather presenter Angela Tsun taking over as her replacement for the 4:30 pm news and 6 pm weather forecasts.

In 2015, Rick Ardon and Susannah Carr celebrated a thirty-year anniversary as a news reading duo. They are one of the longest serving dual news presenter teams in the world and the dual-presenter format used by Seven News Perth has been highly successful. In contrast to previous struggles seen in Sydney and Melbourne in the late 1990s, Seven News Perth has led in the ratings for decades, well ahead of 10 News Perth and Nine News Perth by as many as 100,000 viewers.

Before the move to the Osborne Park Studios in February 2015, Blake Johnson and Samantha Jolly alternated fortnightly presenting for both weekend bulletins. In February 2020, the Seven Network announced that Tim McMillan would join Angela Tsun to present on weekends.

In February 2022, Basil Zempilas left his nightly sport duties due to other commitments and being the Lord Mayor of Perth; he was replaced by Ryan Daniels but remained a fill-in.

In January 2026, it was announced that Rick Ardon and Susannah Carr would transition to presenting Seven News Perth from Thursday to Saturday, with Tim McMillan and Angela Tsun presenting from Sunday to Wednesday.

Fill-in presenters include Tim McMillan, Angela Tsun and Jerrie Demasi (News), Adrian Barich and Anna Hay (sport) and Jerrie Demasi and Amelia Broun (weather).

==== Hobart ====
Following Seven West Media's acquisition of Southern Cross Austereo's Seven affiliated stations, the network gained control of Seven Tasmania from 1 July 2025. The station's flagship Seven News Tasmania program is currently broadcast on TNT and produced from the Southern Cross Austereo studios in Hobart, and airs nightly at 6:00pm, with regular updates during the evening. Seven News Tasmania is presented by Kim Millar from Monday to Wednesday and Michael Maney from Thursday to Sunday. Sport is presented by Triple M Hobart breakfast host Andy “Tubes” Taylor on weeknights. Weather is presented by Kiah Wicks on weeknights and Rick Marton on weekends.

Fill in presenters include Louise Houbaer and Rachel Williams (News) Aaron Smith (Sport) and Jackie Harvey (Weather)

The Tasmania-based news service gained attention on social media after its former owner SCA initially planned to rebrand the former Southern Cross News brand to Seven News Tasmania from 1 July 2018. The launch of the rebranded news service was delayed without prior notice. When asked by ABC's Media Watch, the CEO of SCA Grant Blackley stated that the Seven Network did not want their name featured on any output they do not control at the time. SCA eventually rebranded the service as Nightly News 7 Tasmania the following December, similar to branding previously used from the 1990s to the early 2000s.

On 6 October 2025, the bulletin was rebranded to Seven News Tasmania.

From 24 May 2026, studio presentation of Seven News Tasmania bulletins relocated to the Southern Cross Austereo studios in Hobart, with transmission controlled from Seven’s regional studios in Canberra, ending six decades of Launceston based production.

== Regional bulletins ==
Since acquiring stations from third-party owners, Seven News has produced full news services in most regional markets (either the entire licence area or select sub-markets to fulfil local quota requirements).

Previously, on demand access to regional bulletins in Tasmania, Western Australia and much of the eastern Australia states were made available via separate YouTube channels (either in full or by segments, except in Tasmania, where it shorthened to just local news, sport and weather). After Seven's acquisition, new editions of these services became exclusively available in full on Seven's streaming service 7plus.

=== Regional Queensland ===
Local news bulletins for Regional Queensland are broadcast each weeknight at 6 pm, in all seven regional areas: Cairns, Townsville, Mackay, Wide Bay, Toowoomba, the Sunshine Coast and Rockhampton. They are followed by a shortened 30-minute version of Seven News Brisbane.

The bulletins are presented by Joanne Desmond, with Nathan Spurling co-anchoring the Cairns, Townsville, Rockhampton and Toowoomba editions. Sport is presented by Nathan Spurling and weather is presented by Livio Regano. Fill-in presenters include Emily Steinhardt and Adam Straney (news), Luke McGarry and Saavanah Bourke (sport), Rebekah Jensen (weather).

Reporters and camera crews are based at newsrooms in each of the seven regions with studio presentation for the Cairns, Townsville, Mackay, Darling Downs, Rockhampton and Wide Bay bulletins pre-recorded at STQ studios in Maroochydore. The Sunshine Coast edition of Seven News is broadcast live, but may also exchange it to any of the six pre-recorded regions at certain circumstances (e.g., cyclone coverage in the nearest region of immediate concern). News editing is undertaken by the local newsrooms, and sent to the main Maroochydore studios for transmission.

The most successful local edition is broadcast on the Sunshine Coast. In early 1998, WIN Television launched a competing service publicly stating that it would beat Seven in the ratings within six months. At the end of the 1998 ratings season, after a new station head (Laurie Patton) had overseen a comprehensive re-vamping of the program and its external promotions, Seven Local News had actually increased its audience share by six ratings points.

In early 2004, Seven Local News was re-introduced in the Townsville and Cairns sub-markets as a result of regulations regarding local content on regional television introduced by the Australian Broadcasting Authority.

On 5 March 2007, Seven Local News bulletins commenced production and broadcasts in a widescreen standard-definition digital format. Seven Local News was the first regional news service in regional Queensland to convert to widescreen.

On 22 November 2010, Seven Local News launched a sixth edition for the Rockhampton/Gladstone and Central Queensland region.

On 2 November 2015, Seven Local News launched a seventh edition for the Toowoomba and the Darling Downs region. With the said launch, Seven News became the only news service to cover all regional centres of Queensland since the axing of WIN News in the Mackay region in May 2015. This lasted until July 2017, when rival Nine News began to roll out local composite bulletins for their statewide affiliate Southern Cross Television (which carried Nine programming from July 2016 until July 2021). When the composite Nine News bulletins for Mackay and Toowoomba/Darling Downs were axed on 15 February 2019, Seven News once again became the only news service to cover all regional centres of Queensland.

From 11 July 2016, these editions are consolidated with the Seven News branding, though the openers of these editions remained to address as Seven Local News. The Local News branding was completely phased out on 5 September 2016 in favour of the Seven News brand.

Formerly, there were two bureaus located in Hervey Bay and Gladstone covering their respective regions, but they were closed due to budget reasons.

Rosanna Natoli left her presenter position when she ran for Mayor of the Sunshine Coast, Queensland. She was elected and became Mayor in March 2024.

=== Regional New South Wales ===
Local news bulletins for Regional New South Wales are broadcast each weeknight at 6 pm, in five regional areas: Albury and the Border, Wagga Wagga and the Riverina, Central West (Dubbo and Orange), the North Coast (Coffs Harbour, Port Macquarie and Taree) and the Northern Rivers (Lismore), and Tamworth and New England.

Most of the local bulletins are followed by a complementary bulletin named Seven News at 6:30, a half-hour statewide bulletin with Daniel Gibson covering national and international stories usually seen in metropolitan markets. Albury does not receive this bulletin, instead airing a shortened 30-minute version of Seven News Melbourne as the surrounding New South Wales–Victoria border region leans closer to Melbourne than it does to Sydney.

The local bulletins are presented by Madelaine Collignon and Nick Hose. Sport is presented by Nick Hose and weather is presented by Kirstie Fitzpatrick. Fill-in presenters include Kirstie Fitzpatrick, Daniel Gibson (news), Stephen Murphy, Max Ghent, Jeremy Eager (sport), and Lily O'Brien (weather).

Reporters and camera crews are based at newsrooms in each of the five regions with studio presentation for the Border, Central West, Riverina and New England bulletins pre-recorded at Seven's CBN studios in the Canberra suburb of Watson. The North Coast edition is broadcast live, also from Canberra. News editing is undertaken by the local newsrooms, and reports are sent to the main Canberra studios for transmission.

==== Local News Updates ====
Seven's Canberra studio also produces local news updates for the ACT, Newcastle & Central Coast, Illawarra, Regional Victoria (Ballarat, Bendigo, Gippsland, and Mildura), Broken Hill, Spencer Gulf, and Darwin each weeknight. These updates are presented by Hannah Hartup, with Lily O'Brien, Kirstie Fitzpatrick or Daniel Gibson filling in.

=== Regional Western Australia ===
Seven News Regional WA is broadcast each weeknight at 5:30pm. It is followed by Seven News Perth.

The bulletin is presented from Seven's newsroom in Bunbury by Noel Brunning (news and sport) with weather presented by rotating Bunbury-based reporters (Asher Gibbon, Tamera Francis, or Olivia Fuderer). Weather had previously been presented by Shauna Willis until her departure in October 2022 with no permanent replacement.

Reporters and camera crews are based at newsrooms across regional and remote areas of the state. News editing is undertaken by the local newsrooms, with studio presentation and reports sent to Canberra for transmission via satellite and microwave.

Under the previous Golden West Network and later GWN7 branding, the bulletin was presented and transmitted from the previous Bunbury studios in Roberts Crescent. Production control was shifted to the Canberra headquarters of Prime Media Group in 2018 — Prime had purchased GWN in 1996 and was itself purchased by Seven West Media in 2021 — with local presentation moved to the current Bunbury newsroom.

== Current affairs ==
=== Sunrise ===
Sunrise is the network's breakfast program, aired weekdays from 5:30 am to 9 am. The show is broadcast live from Seven's Eveleigh studios, and is based on a mix of human interest, showbiz and entertainment alongside half-hourly national news and sport bulletins and weather updates (WA viewers regularly receive a locally produced bulletin in place of the national bulletin).

The program is hosted by Natalie Barr and Matt Shirvington with news presenter Edwina Bartholomew and weather presenter Sam Mac.

=== Weekend Sunrise ===
Weekend Sunrise is the weekend edition of Sunrise, aired Saturday and Sunday mornings from 7 am to 10 am. The show is formatted much like its weekday counterpart, broadcast live from Seven's Eveleigh studios, and is based on a mix of human interest, showbiz and entertainment alongside half-hourly national news and sport bulletins and weather updates.

The program is hosted by Monique Wright and David Woiwod, with Sally Bowrey as news presenter and James Tobin as weather presenter.

=== Seven News Spotlight ===
Seven News Spotlight is the network’s prime‑time investigative current affairs program, produced by the 7NEWS division. Spotlight delivers long‑form journalism, interviews and investigations into major national stories, crime cases, political controversies and human‑interest events.

The program is hosted by Michael Usher, with investigations produced and reported by Spotlight’s dedicated team of investigative journalists and producers, who vary depending on the nature of each story. Spotlight frequently features exclusive access, whistleblower accounts and multi‑part coverage of significant national events.

Spotlight is broadcast from Seven’s Sydney operations and airs as standalone specials or multi‑episode investigations. Extended interviews, documents and supplementary material are often published on 7plus and 7NEWS.com.au to accompany each broadcast.

== Former programs ==
=== The 6:57pm News ===
The 6:57pm News was a satirical comedy feature presented by Mark Humphries. It aired every Friday at the end of the 6 pm state-wide bulletins and is also available on the Seven News YouTube channel. The satirical comedy feature began on Friday 12 July 2024 and ended in December 2024.

=== Seven News Gold Coast ===
Seven News Gold Coast was a local half-hour bulletin that aired at 5.30pm on weeknights, covering the Gold Coast area of Queensland.

The bulletin aired as an opt-out on BTQ-7's Gold Coast relay transmitters, ahead of the main 6pm news from Brisbane, which placed it in direct competition with long-running rival Nine Gold Coast News, which had launched in 1996. The bulletin did not air when Australian Test cricket matches were scheduled.

Produced and broadcast from Seven's Gold Coast studio at Surfers Paradise, the bulletin was launched on 4 July 2016 with long-serving presenter and Gold Coast native Rod Young as its first anchor.

From its launch, weekend bulletins were also produced, which made Seven the only network to produce local Gold Coast bulletins seven days a week. However, weekend bulletins were axed in November 2017, citing cost-cutting measures. In February 2018, weekend presenter Amanda Abate was paired with Young as a co-anchor, as well as presenting sport.

In July 2019, after three years on air, Seven News Gold Coast officially became the number one news bulletin on the Gold Coast, winning twenty-one weeks to the rival Nine Gold Coast News' one week.

In 2021, Young stepped down from the bulletin, after formally announcing his retirement from television news. He was then succeeded by Steve Titmus, who became a fill-in presenter for the Brisbane and regional Queensland bulletins before the appointment.

In February 2022, Sally Pearson was appointed sport presenter for the bulletin.

In June 2024, weather and coastal expert Paul Burt was made redundant by the network.

On 19 November 2024, Seven announced it was axing the Gold Coast news as part of a significant overhaul of its local news operations. The final bulletin aired three days later. The Surfers Paradise newsroom was retained as a district bureau to provide Gold Coast coverage for the state-wide 6pm news.

Fill in presenters included Tamra Bow and Michelle Jensen (weather).

=== Seven News at 7 ===
Seven News at 7 aired at 7 pm on weeknights and was presented by Melissa Doyle from Seven's Martin Place studios, with weather presented by David Brown from the Melbourne studio. The bulletin aired on the Seven Network's secondary channel, 7two across Australia and it first aired on 5 August 2013 and was first presented by Mark Ferguson, with Doyle taking over a week later.

Western Australia had its own local live version of Seven News at 7, also presented from the Martin Place studio in Sydney by Sally Bowrey with weather presented by Angela Tsun from the Perth studio.

On 28 April 2014, the bulletin was removed from the schedule.

=== Today Tonight ===
Today Tonight was the network's tabloid current affairs program, which aired on weeknights at 6:30 pm following the 6 pm news bulletins. Local editions were produced in Brisbane, Sydney and Melbourne before being cancelled in 2014 with their respective news bulletins expanded from thirty minutes to one hour. In November 2019, the Adelaide and Perth editions were cancelled, with Seven News in those markets expanded to a full hour, bringing them in line with the east coast.

=== Sunday Night ===
Sunday Night was the network's current affairs and investigative journalism program, which aired on Sunday nights at 8:30pm and presented by Melissa Doyle.

=== The Latest: Seven News ===
The Latest: Seven News aired at or sometime after 10 pm and was presented usually by Tim McMilllan or Jerrie Demasi from Seven's Perth studios. As the title suggests, the late-night bulletin provided up-to-date information on the latest news of the day.

Previously known as Seven Late News, it was presented by Chris Bath or Anne Fulwood from 1995 to 2003, with Natalie Barr filling in. The bulletin was cancelled in December 2003 due to declining ratings. Chris Bath was moved to Seven Morning News (later Seven News Sydney) and Natalie Barr was moved to Sunrise.

In February 2024, it was announced that production would shift to Seven's Perth studios from March, resulting in Usher stepping down from the program. In March 2024, it was confirmed that Tim McMillan would replace Michael Usher and Angela Cox from 18 March.

On 22 January 2025, it was announced that the bulletin would be axed, with its resources reallocated to the other bulletins.

== Controversy ==
=== Outing of David Campbell ===
In 2010, Seven News, and in particular its news director Peter Meakin and reporter Adam Walters, came under heavy criticism for airing a report that outed New South Wales Transport Minister David Campbell as gay. Campbell, a Member of the New South Wales Legislative Assembly for over two decades, resigned after the network aired surveillance footage of Campbell leaving a gay bathhouse. Amid criticism of the story, former NSW Labor Premier Barrie Unsworth condemned Campbell's actions, saying that he had "frequented places where he's easily recognised". Seven's decision to run the story was derided by other politicians and several rival media outlets. Michael Kirby called the incident an act of "pathetic snooping" and "naked homophobia". Seven's justification for airing the story was initially that Campbell had misused his ministerial vehicle; however, this allegation was shown to be untrue by other media outlets, as New South Wales ministers have full private use of their ministerial vehicles.

The Australian Communications and Media Authority initiated an investigation into Seven's conduct in this matter, under the industry's self-regulated code of conduct. It accepted the public interest justification put forward by Seven that Campbell's actions left him "vulnerable to compromise or blackmail".

== Young Achiever Awards ==
The 7NEWS Young Achiever Awards are a group of awards, run by Awards Australia and sponsored by 7News, that "acknowledge, encourage and most importantly promote the positive achievements of all young people" aged 29 years and under. There are separate awards for New South Wales & Australian Capital Territory; Victoria; Queensland; South Australia; and Western Australia. Each award is run with a number of state-based co-sponsors.

Awards Australia, an organisation founded in 1989, also run Young Achiever Awards for Tasmania and Northern Territory, and run Community Achievement Awards for all states and Northern Territory. The awards have had different sponsors and had different names in the past, for example in South Australia, they were formerly sponsored by the Nine Network (from 2004 to 2018), and called "Channel 9 Young Achiever of the Year" Awards.

== Logo history ==
2004–2011

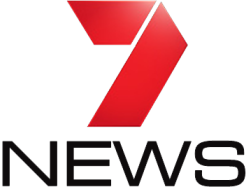
2011–2014

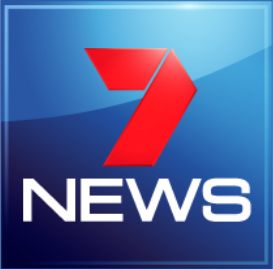
2014–2020

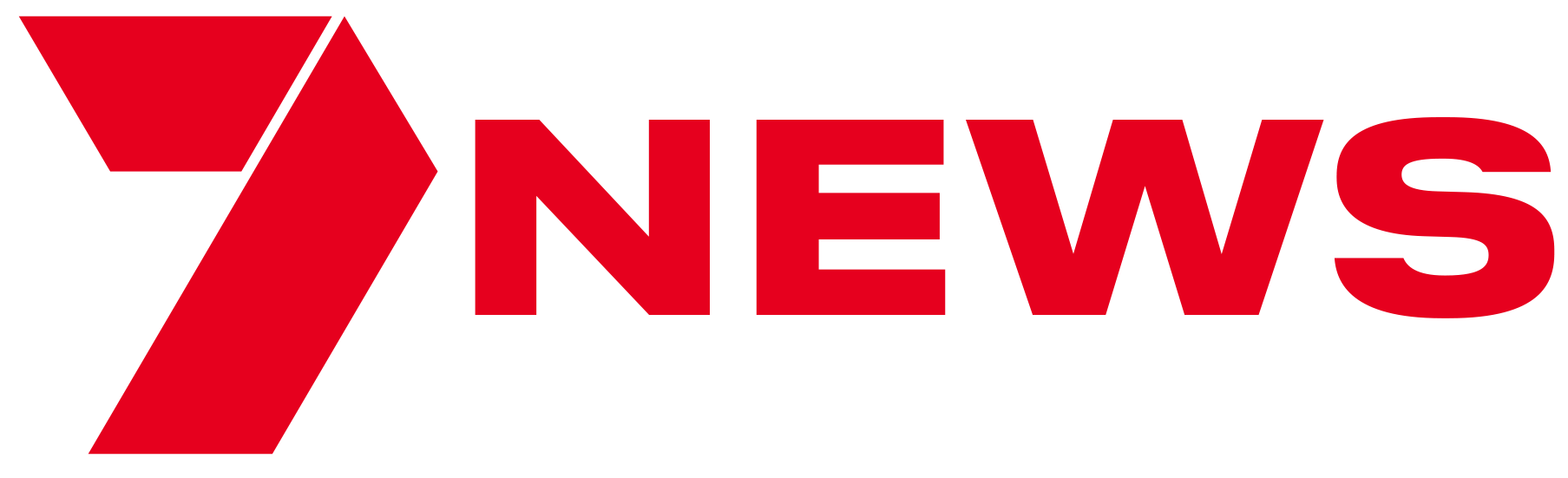
2020–present

== See also ==
- Journalism in Australia
