= Edwina Bartholomew =

Australian journalist and television presenter (born 1983)

- Born: Edwina Louise Christie Bartholomew; Whyalla, South Australia
- Other name: Eddy
- Education: Abbotsleigh; Charles Sturt University
- Occupations: Journalist, TV presenter
- Employer: Seven Network
- Spouse: Neil Varcoe (m. 2018)
- Children: 2

Edwina Louise Christie Bartholomew is an Australian journalist and television presenter. She presents the news on the Seven Network's breakfast television program Sunrise. Previously, she co-hosted Dancing with the Stars and Australian Spartan.

== Career ==
Bartholomew completed her journalism degree at Charles Sturt University and also completed a Masters of International Studies in 2006 at Sydney University. She won a Sunrise Intern competition, where she progressed from making coffee to producing the show.

She also worked as a reporter on 2GB and covered the Beijing Olympics for the Seven Network.

She later returned to Australia and continued to work as a reporter for Seven News before signing on as Sunrise's Sydney correspondent in 2011. She also filed stories for Sunday Night.

In July 2013, Bartholomew was appointed weather presenter on Sunrise, replacing Grant Denyer.

In September 2013, Bartholomew was appointed co-host of Dancing with the Stars.

In January 2016, Bartholomew announced that she would be leaving her role as weather presenter on Sunrise after three years to become the show's entertainment presenter, and primary fill-in news presenter. She was replaced by Sam Mac.

In 2018 and 2019, Bartholomew co-hosted Australian Spartan alongside Hamish McLachlan.

In March 2021, Bartholomew was appointed news presenter on Sunrise replacing Natalie Barr who was promoted to co-host following Samantha Armytage's resignation.

In March 2024, Bartholomew replaced Jodie Speers to present Sunrise Early News, following Speers' departure from the Seven Network. This transition prompted the rebranding of the bulletin from Seven Early News to Sunrise Early News.

== Personal life ==
Bartholomew was born in Whyalla, South Australia. She spent her early years living in Japan and Malaysia. She later boarded at Abbotsleigh School in Wahroonga, Sydney, where she completed her Higher School Certificate and featured in the Distinguished Achievers List.

Bartholomew married Neil Varcoe in April 2018. The couple have a daughter and a son. Bartholomew lives in Sydney.

In July 2024, Bartholomew was diagnosed with chronic myeloid leukaemia.
