= Rebecca Maddern =

Australian television presenter and journalist (born 1977)

- Born: 6 August 1977 (age 49); Geelong, Victoria, Australia
- Occupations: Journalist and presenter
- Years active: 2001−present
- Employer: Seven Network
- Spouse: Trent Miller (m. 2014)
- Children: 1

Rebecca Maddern (born 6 August 1977) is an Australian television presenter and journalist.

Maddern is currently Chief Sports Presenter on Seven News Melbourne.

She has worked at Seven Network for over a decade, where she was a presenter and reporter for Seven News and also presented a variety of programs and events across the network.

== Career ==
Maddern started off her career in radio after she completed a Bachelor of Arts in Media Studies from the RMIT University in 1999. She worked at Melbourne’s Nova 100 early in her media career, where she gained on‑air presenting experience and established herself within commercial radio.

She later moved to become a sports reporter for Melbourne radio station Triple M, whilst there she worked alongside some of the top media personalities of Australia.

=== Seven Network ===
In October 2002, Maddern joined the Seven Network after being offered reporting position by the news director. It was there in her first year of television reporting, she won a Quill Award for her coverage of Victoria's January 2003 bushfires.

In March 2014, Maddern joined Sunrise as Melbourne correspondent replacing Nick Etchells. In recent years, Maddern had reduced duties on Seven News as a senior reporter due to her Sunrise commitments. She remained with Sunrise until her move to the Nine Network. Nathan Templeton replaced her as Melbourne correspondent.

=== Nine Network ===
In March 2016, the Nine Network announced that Maddern would co-host the AFL Footy Show.

In November 2016, Maddern was announced as the host of Australian Ninja Warrior which aired on the Nine Network in July 2017.

In August 2018, it was announced that Maddern would host the network's tennis coverage. It was also announced that she will not be returning to the AFL Footy Show.

In December 2019, the Nine Network announced that Maddern would replace Allison Langdon as host of Weekend Today.

Maddern has also hosted Nine's coverage of the 2019 Cricket World Cup and 2019 Ashes Series in England.

In November 2021, it was announced that Maddern had resigned from the Nine Network after being unable to agree on contractual terms.

=== Return to Seven Network ===
In January 2022, it was announced that Maddern will return to the Seven Network where she will present Seven News Melbourne with Mike Amor on weekends and present Seven Afternoon News Melbourne by replacing Jacqueline Felgate.

On 12 January 2022, leaked footage from Seven News revealed Maddern referring to tennis player Novak Djokovic as a “lying, sneaky arsehole”, in an off-air conversation with Mike Amor. This conversation was sparked by Djokovic's recent release from detention by the Federal Circuit and Family Court of Australia.

In November 2024, it was announced that Maddern will step into an expanded role with Seven News Melbourne starting January 2025, as Chief Sports Presenter replacing Tim Watson.

== Personal life ==
In October 2006, Maddern married Geelong real estate identity James Wilson. They have since divorced.

Maddern was named as the ambassador for the Geelong Cup in 2007.

In 2011, Maddern was named the number one ticket holder for the Geelong Football Club She is also a passionate supporter of the Geelong Football Club, found from her Twitter/X Bio and mostly due to her being born in Geelong.

In March 2014, Maddern married Seven News cameraman Trent Miller. Miller is now a cameraman for GTV-9, and he also provided his services to The AFL Footy Show.
