= David Johnston (newsreader) =

Welsh-born Australian television news presenter (born 1941)

- Born: 4 December 1941 (age 84); Wales, United Kingdom
- Occupations: TV news presenter; radio presenter
- Years active: 1953–2005

David Johnston (born 4 December 1941) is a Welsh-born Australian retired television news presenter. Johnston, known as DJ to hundreds of thousands of viewers and colleagues, presented his last bulletin on the Seven Network on 23 September 2005.

He and wife Eve retired in a property at Bendigo to enjoy country life and be close to their daughter, her husband and their grandchildren.

== Early life and education ==
Johnston emigrated from Wales as an 11-year-old with his mother Lillian in 1953, and settled in Victoria's western districts and later started his secondary education at Terang High School. But his mother soon moved them to Olinda to start a children's holiday home and when that venture failed financially, David had to leave school aged 15 to earn some money. He did various jobs, including working in a nursery and in the middle of it all David realised he wanted to be on radio. With his mother's help, he founded the Bill Roberts Radio School in Melbourne known as "The Vincent School of Broadcasting" and made the journey, sometimes hitchhiking, from Olinda to Ferntree Gully to catch the train into the city.

The radio school regularly sent student tapes to radio stations around the country. David's was one voice on an audition tape sent to 2RG in Griffith, New South Wales and at 17 he secured his first professional radio gig. David spent three years at 2RG and it was in Griffith that he met his future wife, Eve, to whom he later had two daughters, Georgie (born 1971) and Romy (born 1973).

David enjoyed riding his small motor-scooter around the streets of Griffith and hanging out with fellow announcers John Knox, Graham Miles and Peter Churchley, all of whom went on to have long careers in radio in Brisbane, Melbourne and the Sunshine Coast.

== Radio and television career ==
In 1962, Johnston had a 15-month stint with 4KQ in Brisbane before returning to Melbourne as a general announcer and news presenter on 3DB. Nearly 12 months down the track, HSV7 was looking for someone to present the late-night news and Dan Webb suggested Johnston at 3DB, who showed promise. His first major bulletin was announcing the death of US President John F. Kennedy. Johnston split his time between the closely aligned 3DB and the Seven Network in Melbourne until 1967, when he was appointed full-time news reporter and presenter. On 22 June 1972 he hosted, with Lucy Kiraly, the first Tattslotto draw on Melbourne television. Johnston held that role for the next five years before shocking many people by leaving television to run a news agency in Elsternwick.

In 1980, he returned to television to presented the prime time Eyewtiness News on ATV-10 with Jana Wendt and latterly, Jo Pearson. His successful partnerships with both anchors helped make Eyewitness News the leading nightly news bulletin in Melbourne throughout the 1980s. David stayed in this role until returning to the Seven Network in 1996 to become the weekday anchor of Seven Nightly News in Melbourne. He presented this bulletin solo from 1996 until mid-1999, when he became a co-anchor with Anne Fulwood.

Johnston became a relief anchor a year later but returned full-time in 2003 to anchor a national news bulletin, titled "Target Iraq", at 4.30 pm each weekday afternoon to cover the major story, and to summarise Australian news from Sydney. The bulletin was retained and reformatted to a standard news bulletin (titled Seven's 4:30 News, then Seven Afternoon News) following the end of the strike on Iraq, with production moving to Melbourne and Johnston continuing at the helm until his retirement in 2005.

== Awards ==
He has won various awards, including a Logie and two Penguin awards.
