= Mark Ferguson (news presenter) =

Australian news presenter (born 1966)

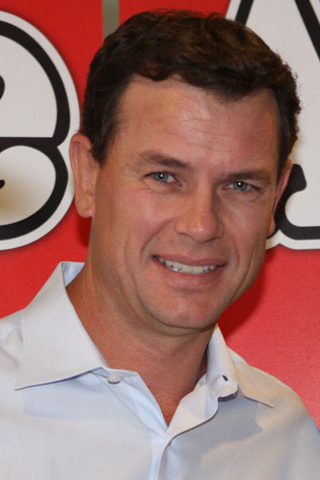
- Ferguson in 2012
- Born: 22 February 1966 (age 60); Tamworth, New South Wales, Australia
- Occupation: Seven News presenter
- Years active: 1989−present
- Spouse: Jayne Ferguson
- Children: 3

Mark Ferguson (born 22 February 1966) is an Australian television news presenter, who currently presents Seven News in Sydney on weeknights.

He was previously a senior news presenter with Nine News Sydney.

== Career ==
After working with regional stations in New South Wales and Queensland, Ferguson joined the Seven Network in 1989 and reported for a number of Seven News programs, including 11AM and Hinch.

He moved to Sydney in 1991, before moving to the Nine Network in 1992. At Nine he became London correspondent and reported from the UK on a number of major stories including the death of Princess Diana.

In 1997, he returned to Sydney as a reporter and in 2001 became a presenter, initially on the National Nine Early News at 6 am, and later the National Nine Morning News at 11 am.

In 2003, he became the weekend presenter of National Nine News Sydney, occasionally filling in for Jim Waley on weeknights whenever required. He presented the flagship 6:00 pm weeknight news in Waley's absence in the final quarter of 2003 when he took leave to battle skin cancer, and during the 2004–2005 non-ratings period, in which the 2004 Boxing Day tsunami disaster in south-east Asia occurred. His efforts during this coverage, which drew high ratings for Nine, saw him retain the main weeknight presenting role on a permanent basis, replacing Waley, under whom the bulletin had retained a comfortable ratings lead following the retirement of Brian Henderson in 2002. However, due to dwindling ratings at the Nine Network, Ferguson was replaced by Peter Overton in January 2009 and demoted back to his former weekend presenting role.

In July 2009, it was revealed that Ferguson would move to Seven News from October. Ferguson, who had been with Nine for 17 years, was removed immediately from the weekend bulletin, and was replaced by Georgie Gardner. He continued to present the news on This Afternoon, and then on Nine Afternoon News until September 2009.

In September 2009, he signed off Nine News for the final time, after more than 17 years with the network. He then presented the weekend bulletin on Seven News Sydney, replacing Chris Bath who took over from Ian Ross.

Ferguson also presented Sunday Night while Chris Bath was at the 2012 London Olympics.

In January 2014, Ferguson was appointed weeknight presenter for Seven News Sydney replacing Chris Bath.
