= Andrew Daddo =

Australian actor

- Born: Andrew Dugald Daddo; 18 February 1967 (age 59); Melbourne, Victoria, Australia
- Education: Peninsula Grammar; Millburn Junior High; Melbourne Grammar; Monash University
- Occupations: Actor; Voice artist; TV and radio presenter; Author
- Years active: 1987−present
- Spouse: Jacquie Daddo
- Children: 3
- Family: Cameron Daddo; Lochie Daddo
- Website: www.andrewdaddo.com

Andrew Dugald Daddo (born 18 February 1967) is an Australian actor, author and television and radio personality.

== Early life ==
Daddo was born in Melbourne on 18 February 1967. He was one of five children to parents Peter and Bronwen Daddo, growing up alongside older sister Belinda, older brother Cameron, identical twin brother, Jamie (who is an artist) and younger brother Lochie. Cameron and Lochie are also actors and television presenters.

Daddo began his education at Mt Eliza Primary School and in year seven moved to Peninsula Grammar. After a short stint at the grammar school, the Daddo family moved away and he continued his education at Millburn Junior High in New Jersey, USA. Returning to Australia, he spent the last two and a half years of his schooling at Melbourne Grammar School. Daddo holds an Arts degree from Monash University. majoring in Politics and History.

== Career ==
=== Actor and presenter ===
Daddo started his television career while still at university. In 1987 he began co-hosting music show The Factory with Alex Papps, broadcast on ABC TV on Saturday mornings, from 1987 to 1989. He was also a host on Countdown Revolution in 1989. He then moved to New York in 1989 for a role as VJ on the American MTV network, but was sacked in 1991.

He relocated to Australia in 1992, and took on two acting roles in Round the Twist and Cluedo playing Professor Plum in the latter.

In 1994, Daddo presented two episodes of British travel series Globe Trekker (also known as Lonely Planet) in 1994. The following year, he hosted Australia's Funniest People, the TV Week Logie Awards and World's Greatest Commercials, the latter until 1996.

In 1999, Daddo hosted Kidspeak, the Australian adaptation of Kids Say the Darndest Things, alongside Ernie Dingo. He next worked as co-anchor on the Seven Network's 11AM until mid-2000, when he began co-hosting Olympic Sunrise alongside Johanna Griggs, during the Sydney 2000 Olympics. In 2002, he reunited with Ernie Dingo as a presenter on the Seven Network's The Great Outdoors until 2008, after previously having hosted the show in 1994.

Daddo was the host of the television series The One which premiered on the Seven Network in July 2008. During the 2008 Beijing Olympics, he hosted an Olympics-oriented morning talk show, Yum Cha. In February of that year, Daddo was appointed presenter of ABC Radio Sydney's evening program. In May 2009, he resigned from the ABC to co-host live news-style series This Afternoon on the Nine Network, which was axed after two and a half weeks on air, due to poor ratings. He also hosted the Ozspell Australian Spelling Championships.

Daddo's radio hosting duties have also included the summer afternoons program on Sydney's 2UE, Bay 13 Radio Show (3RRR), 3AW Melbourne, the Sunday Morning Fishing Show on 2SM Super Radionetwork, ABC Radio Canberra and Mamamia’s This Glorious Mess podcast.

Daddo was the narrator of the first season of reality series The Apprentice Australia in 2009 and has been the narrator of RBT: Random Breath Testing since 2010.

In 2015, Daddo was a contestant on the reality competition show: I'm a Celebrity...Get Me Out of Here!. He was the fifth contestant to be evicted. In 2016 he hosted The New Golf Show, a golf television broadcast on Fox Sports. He has also hosted Channel 9’s Subaru's Great Australian Detour for several seasons, where he explores terrain across the country in a Subaru Forester SUV.

In 2022, Daddo collaborated with Nova to launch the podcast series So You Want to Make a TV Show with brother Cameron Daddo, which detailed the creative process behind making scripted television.

Daddo also works as an MC. He has presented the International Advertising Festival in Cannes several times, Ian Thorpe's Foundation launch, the John Eales Medal, The Lions v Wallabies series and The Tri Nations.

=== Author ===
Daddo is also an accomplished author, having written numerous books, including picture books, chapter books, short story collections, young adult novels and adult non-fiction. His first book, Sprung! was a collection of comical short stories about a character called Fergus Kipper, the protagonist of a series which continued in Sprung Again!, You’re Dropped!, Dacked!, and Flushed!

In 2006, he wrote It's All Good, a memoir about Ray O'Neal, who he'd met in 1991 and set off with on a motorcycle trip across America, forming a great friendship in the process. O'Neal died in an accident in 2004, leaving behind a wife and a young daughter, after which Daddo wrote the memoir about his time with Ray.

In 2019, Daddo released the first book from his middle-grade children's adventure series, Atticus Van Tasticus, about a 10-year-old boy whose grandma gifts him a pirate ship. He collaborated on the project with illustrator Stephen Michael King, with whom he had previously worked on the book Whatcha Building?

Other children’s titles include Good Night Me, Youse Two, Muffin Top, Grandma’s Guide to Happiness, Stuff Happens: Ned, Wet Cement, Creepy Cool, Dog of a Day and The Girl Trap.

Daddo also had a regular column in Australian Golf Digest and Sydney's The Sun-Herald.

== Personal life ==
Daddo currently resides in the Northern Beaches of Sydney, with wife Jacquie and their three children.

== Credits ==
=== Film ===
Year	Title	Role	Station
1993	Body Melt	Johnno	Feature film
2003	Ned	Doctor	Feature film
TBA	Trouble Down Under	Caesar the Cattle Dog	Animated feature film (pre-production)

=== Television ===
Year	Title	Role	Station	Ref.
	Countdown Revolution	Presenter		
1987–1989	The Factory	Host	8 episodes	
1990	A Kink in the Picasso	Nick Rosa	TV movie	
Early 1990s	MTV USA	VJ / Host		
1992	Round the Twist	Ghost Matthew	Season 2, 13 episodes	
1992	Cluedo	Professor Plum	Seasons 1–2, 21 episodes	
1993	The Great Outdoors	Presenter	1 episode	
1994	Lonely Planet	Traveller	2 episodes	
1995–1996	The World's Greatest Commercials	Host		
1999	Kidspeak	Co-host (with Ernie Dingo)		
1999	All-Star Squares	Panellist		
	11AM	Co-Anchor		
2000	Olympic Sunrise	Host		
	Royal Children's Hospital Good Friday Appeal	Presenter	TV special	
1995–2005	Carols in the Domain	Co-Host	TV special	
2008	The One: The Search for Australia’s Most Gifted Psychic	Host	Seasons 1–2	
2008	Yum Cha	Host		
2009	This Afternoon	Host	12 episodes	
2009	The Apprentice Australia	Narrator	Season 1, 10 episode	
2010–2024	RBT	Narrator	Seasons 1-13	
2014	Save Your Life Tonight	Host		
	Studio 10	Guest Host		
2015	I'm a Celebrity…Get Me Out of Here! Australia	Contestant	Season, 5th contestant eliminated	
2015	The Lucky Country	Host	4 episodes	
2016	The New Golf Show	Host		
2017–2018	Clash of the Collectables	Narrator	6 episodes	
	Great Australian Detours	Host		

=== Theatre ===
Year	Title	Role	Notes	Ref.
1993	Ladies' Night	Barry Gateway	National Theatre, Melbourne, The Tivoli, Brisbane	
2004	Sprung!	Writer	Earl Arts Centre, Launceston, Mt Isa Civic Centre, Darwin Entertainment Centre, Glen St Theatre, Sydney, IMB Theatre, Wollongong with Monkey Baa Productions	

=== Radio ===
Year	Title	Role	Station	Ref.
	Bay 13 Radio Show	Host	3RRR Melbourne	
	Radioactive Radio Show	Host		
		Host	3AW	
	Sunday Morning Fishing Show	Host	2SM Super Radio Network	
	666 ABC Radio Canberra	Host	ABC Radio Canberra	
	Summer Afternoon	Host	2UE Macquarie Sports Radio	
2008–2009	Sydney Evening Program	Host	ABC Radio Sydney	
2015–?	This Glorious Mess	Co-host	Mamamia Podcast Network	
2020–2025	Golf – Podcast	Host	Apple Podcasts	
2022	So You Want to Make a TV Show	Co-host (with Cameron Daddo)	Nova podcast	
2025	Weekend Evenings	Presenter	ABC Radio	
2025	NSW Afternoons	Presenter	ABC Radio	

=== Bibliography ===
Year	Title	Credit	Publisher	Ref.
2001	Sprung!	Author	Hodder Headline Australia	
2002	Sprung Again!	Author	Hachette Book Group	
2002	Creepy Cool	Author	Hodder Headline Australia	
2002	Writing in Wet Cement	Author	Hachette Book Group	
2003	Dog of a Day	Author	Hodder Headline Australia	
2003	You're Dropped!	Author	Hachette Book Group	
2004	Girl Trap	Author	Hachette Book Group	
2004	Flushed!	Author	Hachette Book Group	
2004	Dacked!	Author	Hachette Book Group	
2004	Chewing the Seatbelt	Author	Walker Books Ltd	
2005	Youse Two	Author	Hachette Book Group	
2006	Good Night Me	Author	Hachette Book Group	
2006	Muffin Top	Author	HarperCollins	
2006	It's All Good	Author	Hodder Headline Australia	
2007	Laugh Even Louder!	Contributor (for Camp Quality)	Scholastic Australia Pty Limited	
2007	That Aussie Christmas Book	Author	Scholastic Australia Pty Limited	
2007	Run, Kid, Run!	Author	HarperCollins	
2010	Skoz the Dog: Ready, Steady… Kaboom!	Author	HarperCollins	
2010	Skoz the Dog: All At Sea	Author	HarperCollins	
2010	Skoz the Dog: Up in the Air	Author	HarperCollins	
2010	Skoz the Dog: Leader of the Pack	Author	HarperCollins	
2010	Cheeky Monkey	Author	HarperCollins	
2011	I Do It	Author	HarperCollins	
2012	Daddy's Cheeky Monkey	Author	HarperCollins	
2012	Monster	Author	HarperCollins	
2013	First Day	Author	HarperCollins	
2014	Check on Me	Author	HarperCollins	
2014	Stuff Happens: Ned	Author	Penguin Books	
2015	When I Grow Up	Author	HarperCollins	
2016	One Step	Author	Penguin Books	
2017	Whatcha Building?	Author	HarperCollins	
2018	Old Friends, New Friends	Author	HarperCollins	
2018	Just Breathe	Author	Penguin Books	
2019	A Lot of Stuff Happens	Author (with Oliver Phommavanh, William Kostakis & Adrian Beck)	Penguin Random House Australia	
2019	Atticus Van Tasticus	Author	Penguin Books	
2020	Atticus Van Tasticus 2: The Map of Half Maps	Author	Penguin Books	
2020	Atticus Van Tasticus 3: The Treasure of Treasures	Author	Penguin Books	
2023	Grandma’s Guide to Happiness	Author	HarperCollins	
2023	Poo Face	Author (with Jonathan Bentley)	Penguin Books	
2025	Fart Face	Author (with Jonathan Bentley)	Penguin Books	
2025	Grandpa's Guide to Happiness	Author	HarperCollins	
2026	Bitza Book 1	Author	Penguin Books	
2026	Bitza Book 2	Author	Penguin Books	
