= Marianne O'Grady =

Teacher and deputy country director for Care International Afghanistan

- Occupation: Deputy country director Afghanistan for Care International
- Known for: International humanitarian work, training teachers and educating women and girls

Marianne O'Grady is an American teacher and Afghanistan's deputy country director for Care International who said that the Taliban "cannot un-educate millions of people" in the fall of Kabul (2021) and anticipated that women would continue to teach other women and girls, even if forced back "behind the wall".

== Teaching career ==
O'Grady was an American primary school teacher from 1998 to 2009 in Cambridge, Massachusetts and San Francisco, California. She also taught student teachers how to teach mathematics and science at the University of San Francisco Graduate School of Education and at San Francisco State University.

== Volunteering during vacations ==
From 2005 to at least 2009, O'Grady used her school vacations to volunteer in Afghanistan and Belize to help teachers in these countries who could not afford to attend college to learn how to teach science. She also taught about child development.

Her travel and accommodation in remote rural areas were very basic on these trips. O'Grady's teacher training classes were held out of doors and often at high personal risk. She told one of her sponsors, Canadian Women for Women in Afghanistan, at a "Courage to Learn" seminar (in Ontario, Canada, October 2008) that one day whilst she was showing Afghan teachers (male and female) in Khost province how to teach the use of microscopes and magnifying glasses, the U.S. Army told her that she was in the firing line for "enemy" bombers and had to be airlifted to safety. She said, "If I have just two hours left in my life, I want to spend it teaching".

The following year, O'Grady personally took (via the non-profit School is Open that she began) a donation of 300 knitted items from the charity "Afghans for Afghans" and her San Francisco Friends School to a rural Afghan school for returning refugees, near the city of Jalalabad. It had ten rooms, with bathrooms and a well, teaching boys and girls in separate half-day sessions. She reported to donors that members of both groups said they wanted to be "teachers, engineers or doctors".

== Role with international charities ==
In 2015, O'Grady reported on comparing child development opportunities in schools in Faryab, Saripol, Kandahar and Kabul provinces of Afghanistan with Save the Children.

In 2016, she was one of the named authors of Save the Children's overall report on developing the direct assessment of child development on motor function, language and early literacy, numeracy and socio-emotional development. The tool is suitable for children aged 3–6, and was tested in 45 countries for international use. It helps identify teaching opportunities and gaps in developmental progress: International Development and Early Learning Assessment. The report is IDELA: Fostering Common Solutions for Young Children. In 2018, she presented further on the experience of using the IDELA model in China and India in an international webinar.

By 2020, O'Grady was deputy country director for Care International in Afghanistan, reporting on statistics regarding the challenges of conflict, drought and the COVID-19 pandemic affecting women and families. She said that the "triple crisis of the economic hardship created by the pandemic, the drought and the current insecurity leaves women in an incredibly difficult situation. Hard-won gains by women and girls are being rolled back." A USAID funded map of the drought areas was shared and updated in July 2021.

She spoke at a virtual donor's conference, also in 2020, after which an appeal was made about targeting international investments for improving gender equality. Statistics had identified evidence of the relatively poor position of the country on most measures of equality, women's personal safety and lack of basic rights. O'Grady emphasized the need for women to be involved in peace-building, saying,

"Women are also the central caretakers of families and everyone is affected when they are excluded from peace-building. Women are advocates for peace, as peacekeepers, relief workers and mediators. Women have already been shown to play prominent roles in peace processes in the Horn of Africa such as in Sudan and Burundi, where they have contributed as observers. They could be a real asset to Afghanistan's peace process if allowed to do so."

In August 2021, the US forces were withdrawing and the Taliban were pushing across the country, until the fall of Kabul, then taking over from the elected government. O'Grady updated CARE's analysis, which she stated showed that Afghanistan is among the most challenging humanitarian crises in the world, with a population, including women, the least able to respond effectively. She asked for support from donors and the new regime to ensure that humanitarian organisations could support the most vulnerable people in safety in the current situation.

O'Grady recognized the fears that Afghan women have regarding their position in a new Taliban regime, but her hope was that the experience of 25 years prior, when women and girls were prevented from education, would not be entirely repeated. She was widely reported internationally (from an Associated Press interview) as being convinced that "you cannot un-educate millions of people" and that if women did go "back behind walls", they could still educate "neighbours, cousins and their own children". Reports of various examples of men's behaviour towards educated women since the Taliban takeover (and before) may threaten O'Grady's hopes.

O'Grady remains in post with Sam Mort of UNICEF Afghanistan. She recognizes that "now is a time for the humanitarian sector to be here and to serve", and the humanitarian needs of 18 million people there, especially "displaced" women and girls, "have never been greater".

== See also ==
- Reactions to the 2021 fall of Kabul
- Care International

== External sources ==
- Interview: Afghan women fear Taliban-dominated future - YouTube at 3m:45s
- Afghan women fear “dark days” amid Taliban sweep | The Christian Century
