= The One (TV program) =

2008–2011 Australian TV series

- Developed by: Seven Network
- Presented by: Andrew Daddo
- Country of origin: Australia
- Original language: English
- No. of seasons: 2
- No. of episodes: 5 (S1); 8 (S2)

Production
- Executive producers: David Maher, David Taylor, Lisa Fitzpatrick (S1); Maxine Gray (S2)
- Producer: Maurice Parker (S2)
- Running time: Approximately 60 minutes (including advertising intervals)

Original release
- Network: Seven Network
- Release: 8 July 2008 – 2011

The One is an Australian television program broadcast by the Seven Network, hosted by Andrew Daddo. The program pits several alleged psychics against one another, participating in trials which challenge their purported abilities in activities such as clairvoyance, telepathy and mediumship to determine who is Australia's "top psychic".

The show was originally created by Fox Studios Australia, who in 2006 contracted Simon Turnbull, President of the Australian Psychics Association, to help create the show. The psychics' abilities are observed by a studio audience or at external locations, and are judged by a two-person panel including Stacey Demarco, a self-described 'metaphysicist', and Richard Saunders, a life member of the Australian Skeptics.

Season 1 of the show (5 episodes) premiered in Australia on Tuesday, 8 July 2008, and ended on 5 August 2008. Season 2 (8 episodes) aired in Australia on the Seven Network, from Wednesday, 5 October 2011, ending on 23 November 2011.

The program was broadcast with closed captions and was rated PG.

== Season 1 (2008) ==
The show was filmed at Fox Studios, Sydney with a production team of David Maher, David Taylor and Lisa Fitzpatrick. The show featured seven contestants, selected from over 1500 applicants.

=== Contestants ===
- Mitchell Coombes – First to be voted off.
- Rayleen Kable – Second to be voted off and host of a paranormal radio show on the mid-coast of NSW; later starred in the 2014 series Haunting: Australia.
- Shé D'Montford – Third to be voted off.
- Jason Betts – Fourth to be voted off.
- Amanda Roussety – Top Three contestant. Housewife and mother of three, was the only non-professional psychic to appear on the show.
- Ezio De Angelis – Top Three contestant. A stage medium.
- Charmaine Wilson – The winner of the inaugural season of The One.

Eliminations were made by the judges each week. On the final episode of The One the winner was chosen by the Australian public, voting via a telephone popularity poll.

=== Episode 1, broadcast 8 July 2008 ===
Test – "Little Boy Lost". A boy (an actor with his mother and safety officers nearby) is hidden in bushland with contestants given 15 minutes to find him using their claimed psychic abilities. Rayleen Kable failed. Jason Betts succeeded. Mitchell Coombes failed. Amanda Roussety failed. Charmaine Wilson failed. Ezio De Angelis failed. Shé D'Montford succeeded.

The episode also had contestants doing readings to members of the studio audience. Contestants were also asked to predict which three of them would reach the final episode. No contestant was eliminated at the end of this episode.

=== Episode 2, broadcast 15 July 2008 ===
Test 1 – "Container Search". A dummy bomb is hidden in 1 of 70 large shipping containers at an international port with contestants given 15 minutes to find it using their claimed psychic abilities. All contestants failed to find the dummy bomb.

Test 2 – "Inside the Mind of an Olympian". Contestants tried to glean details about Australian Olympians, using their claimed psychic abilities via holding a personal item belonging to the Olympian (a practice known as psychometry), then face to face. Olympians featured on the episode were Lisa Forrest, Louise Sauvage, Elka Graham, Matt Welsh, Shelley Oates-Wilding, Tatiana Grigorieva and Geoff Huegill.

The episode also had contestants doing readings to members of the studio audience. Mitchell Coombes and Rayleen Kable were eliminated at the end of this episode. Mitchell Coombes' prediction of the final three were Mitchell Coombes, Charmaine Wilson and Ezio De Angelis. Rayleen Kable's prediction of the final three were Rayleen Kable, Ezio De Angelis and Amanda Roussety.

=== Episode 3, broadcast 22 July 2008 ===
Test 1 – "Where’s Ned?" Contestants search for where the remains of bushranger Ned Kelly were found in the grounds of Old Melbourne Gaol, using their claimed psychic abilities. Charmaine Wilson, Ezio De Angelis and Amanda Roussety came close to the location with Jason Betts and Shé D'Montford at more of a distance.

Test 2 – "Rock 'N' Roll Revelations". Contestants blindfolded themselves and touched an item belonging to famous rock stars. They then used their claimed psychic abilities to describe and possibly name the deceased owner. The items used were a jacket belonging to Michael Hutchence, a sweatband belonging to Freddie Mercury, a guitar belonging to Billy Thorpe, a figurine belonging to John Lennon and a pair of pants belonging to Bon Scott. No contestants named the rock stars in question. Guests on the panel were Ian "Molly" Meldrum and Glenn A. Baker.

The episode also had contestants doing readings to members of the studio audience. Shé D'Montford was eliminated at the end of this episode. Her prediction of the final three were Charmaine Wilson, Rayleen Kable and Shé D'Montford.

=== Episode 4, broadcast 29 July 2008 ===
Test 1 – "Medical Marvels". Contestants were presented with volunteers who had known medical conditions. They then used their claimed psychic abilities to describe the conditions. Volunteer #1 had a kidney transplant. Volunteer #2 had skin cancer, glaucoma and emphysema. Volunteer #3 had lost her left leg below the knee. Volunteer #4 had suffered a stroke in 2001. Volunteer #5 had suffered 17 broken bones in the past. Contestants mentioned many possible conditions for each volunteer.

Test 2 – "Airport Baggage". Contestants were asked to match an item of baggage to its owner at an airport. All contestants failed to match the baggage to its owner.

Test 3 – "Celebrity YES or NO". Contestants were seated on the one side of a screen while a celebrity was seated on the other side, out of view. The celebrity then pressed a button to indicate when the contestant was right with their questions and statements. Celebrities featured on the episode were Guy Leech, Paul O’Brien, Toni Pearen and Justin Melvey.

The show also had contestants doing readings in the street. Jason Betts was eliminated at the end of this episode. His prediction of the final three were Jason Betts, Ezio De Angelis and Rayleen Kable.

=== Episode 5, broadcast 5 August 2008 ===
Test 1 – "Where’s Peter Falconio?" Contestants were flown to the location in the Northern Territory near where UK tourist Peter Falconio was murdered in 2001. They then used their claimed psychic abilities to try to find his missing body. All contestants failed to find the body.

The show also had contestants doing readings of members of the studio audience and in the street.

The winner of the series was decided by a phone in poll, with Charmaine Wilson receiving the most votes. Wilson "...couldn't find a boy lost in the woods in episode one, couldn't find a cargo of barrels in a shipping container in episode two, failed to identify the location of Ned Kelly's remains in episode three, couldn't match a piece of luggage with a passenger in episode four, and shed no light on the location of the body of Peter Falconio in episode five." Her prediction of the final three were Charmaine Wilson, Ezio De Angelis and Amanda Roussety. Ezio De Angelis' prediction of the final three were Charmaine Wilson, Shé D'Montford and Ezio De Angelis. Amanda Roussety's prediction of the final three were Mitchell Coombes, Shé D'Montford and Amanda Roussety.

== Season 2 (2011) ==
After an absence of over three years, the series returned to air on Channel 7 at 19:30 on 5 October 2011 with Andrew Daddo returning to host it.

The show was filmed at Global Studios, Eveleigh, Australia with a production team of Maxine Gray (Executive Producer) and Maurice Parker (Supervising Producer). It featured ten contestants, selected from over 800 applicants in accordance with an agreement with the Seven Network and the Australian Psychics Association.

Contestants:

- Anthony Grzelka - Fifth to be voted off.
- Debbie Malone - A top three contestant: self-described 'psychic medium'.
- Greg Riley - Voted by the audience as the winner: self-described 'psychic', hypnotist and therapist.
- Katrina Cavanough - Sixth to be voted off.
- Michael Wheeler - Second/third to be voted off.
- Julie McKenzie - Second/third to be voted off.
- Maria Elita - Fourth to be voted off.
- Heidi Hanley - A top three contestant: self-described 'psychic healer', 'empath' and 'intuitive'.
- Salvatore Trimboli - Seventh to be voted off.
- Valerie Bradshaw - First to be voted off.

Episode 1, broadcast 5 October 2011

Test “Lost”. Contestants had 15 minutes to locate a helicopter in a pine forest. According to the episode, the area to be searched was the size of 200 football fields. Each had a map and an item belonging to the pilot. Maria Elita, Debbie Malone, Heidi Hanley, Michael Wheeler, Julie McKenzie and Valerie Bradshaw failed. Greg Riley, Anthony Grzelka, Katrina Cavanough and Salvatore Trimboli succeeded.

The episode also had contestants doing readings to members of the studio audience. Contestants were also asked to predict which three of them would reach the final episode. No contestant was eliminated at the end of this episode.

Episode 2, broadcast 12 October 2011

Test 1 - “Speed”. Contestants had seven minutes to find a 'jewel thief' (an actor played the role) amongst passengers on two train carriages, while the train was in motion. Contestants were to glean information about the thief using ‘energies’ picked up from his backpack via 'Psychometry'. They also claimed to invoke 'Remote Viewing' and 'Spirit Guides'. All contestants failed to find the jewel thief.

Test 2 - “Medical Intuitive”. Four volunteers with known medical conditions appeared on stage. “Doug” had his left kidney removed after a bout of cancer. “Sue” picked up a parasite on a trip to Africa (and also was pregnant during the taping of the episode). “Kirstin” lost her leg below the knee after a tumor. “Pavel” had face reconstruction after an accident. The contestants identified many ailments they thought the volunteers might have, but none successfully named the exact condition. This, however, was a matter of some debate between the judges.

Valerie Bradshaw was eliminated at the end of this episode.

Episode 3, broadcast 19 October 2011

Test 1 - “Homicide”. Contestants were taken to a Sydney apartment where, in April 1976, Maureen Klaus was murdered by Kenneth Ballantyne by means of strangulation with the stick of a feather duster. Each contestant was given an unspecified amount of time to wander about the apartment to see if they could glean information on why the murder took place, how Maureen Klaus was killed and where her body was found. Information on the case was provided by retired Detective Inspector John MacGregor of the NSW Police, who watched the contestants on closed-circuit TV. Contestants made many guesses about the crime, some right but most wrong.

Test 2 - “Relationship Challenge”. Four couples were split into two lines, facing each other on the stage. Their positions were random, so the contestants did not know who from one line was coupled with their counterpart in the other line. Contestants were asked to use their claimed psychic powers to match the couples. Julie McKenzie, Michael Wheeler, Anthony Grzelka and Greg Riley failed to match any couple. Maria Elita, Katrina Cavanough, Heidi Hanley and Debbie Malone matched two couples. Salvatore Trimboli matched two couples. The overall results were more or less in line with chance.

Julie McKenzie and Michael Wheeler were eliminated at the end of this episode.

Episode 4, broadcast 26 October 2011

Test 1 - “Bag O’ Hammers”. Before the studio recording, a large, heavy sledgehammer was used by a muscular man, “Jason”, to smash up a car in a wreckers yard. He was asked to do this act with anger and strong emotions, in order to transfer his “negative energy” into the hammer. Six other identical sledgehammers were scuffed and marked to give them a similar appearance. In the studio, all seven hammers were seen hanging from a frame and contestants were asked to match the correct hammer to Jason, who was standing to the side. Each contestant had a one in seven chance of picking the correct hammer, even if no paranormal powers were used. The hammer used by Jason was #4 in the line. Debbie Malone, Greg Riley and Katrina Cavanough picked #4, Anthony Grzelka picked #6, Heidi Hanley picked #5, Salvatore Trimboli #6 and Maria Elita #3.

Test 2 - “Car Boot”. A volunteer was placed into the boot (trunk) of one of 55 cars parked in a suburban train station parking lot. (Nine cars were excluded, owing to the back section being visible, leaving 46 in play.) The contestants were asked to locate the volunteer using their claimed powers. Greg Riley chose the right car, Katrina Cavanough, Heidi Hanley, Debbie Malone, Salvatore Trimboli, Maria Elita and Anthony Grzelka chose wrong cars.

Test 2 - “Psychic Lost and Found”. Contestants were given a small piece of personal property belonging to members of the studio audience and were asked to use their claimed powers to glean information about the owner. This is known as 'Psychometry'. There were mixed results, with skeptic judge Saunders remarking on some of the vague comments and questions posed by the contestants.

Maria Elita was eliminated at the end of this episode.

Episode 5, broadcast 2 November 2011

Test 1 - “Sport Memorabilia”. Items used by various famous sporting figures were placed on the main stage under a cloth covering. These were: a cricket bat used by Sir Donald Bradman; a tennis dress worn by Evonne Goolagong Cawley; a blanket used by around-the-world sailor Jessica Watson; a saddle used by Darren Beadman in his winning ride for the 1996 Melbourne Cup; a boxing glove used by Mike Tyson and a racing suit worn by motor-racing legend Peter Brock. To comment on the test, guest judges Simon Reeve and Tony Squires - both from the 7 Network - were brought in. Each of the remaining contestants were brought to the stage and stood behind one of the covered items. Then, one by one, the contestants were ‘blindfolded’ with a simple velvet cloth and permitted to touch and feel the now uncovered item. Heidi Hanley (saddle) incorrectly identified ‘cricket’ and Shane Warne; Greg Riley (racing suit) correctly identified ‘racing’ but incorrectly gave the name Juan Manuel Fangio; Anthony Grzelka (blanket) incorrectly identified a towel and Dawn Fraser; Katrina Cavanough (cricket bat) incorrectly identified a rifle and the letter ‘A’; Salvatore Trimboli (boxing glove) correctly identified a boxing glove but incorrectly gave the name Geoff; Debbie Malone (tennis dress) incorrectly gave the answers ‘running’ and Nova Peris-Kneebone.

Test 2 - “Tunnels”. Contestants were taken to the location of George's Head in Mosman, Sydney, where a series of tunnels are located. (They were built to defend Sydney in the 1800s). Hiding in one section of the tunnels was a young boy and his dog. Contests each had an item belonging to the boy and a map of the tunnel system. Their task was to locate, above ground, the section of the tunnels in which the boy was hiding below. Katrina Cavanough chose a spot 20 metres away from the boy, Salvatore Trimboli 13 metres away, Greg Riley 6 metres away, Heidi Hanley 14 metres away, Debbie Malone 18.5 metres away and Anthony Grzelka 23 metres away.

Test 3 - “Imposter”. Five people from the sport of fencing were brought onto the main stage, together with an imposter, making six. All were dressed in full fencing gear, complete with masks. Contestants were brought onto the stage one at a time with the task of identifying the imposter. The fencers changed position on the stage before each new contestant. All contestants failed to identify the imposter.

Anthony Grzelka was eliminated at the end of this episode.

Episode 6, broadcast 9 November 2011

Test 1 - “Dog Channelling". Dogs were brought onto the main stage, one at a time, and contestants were asked to ‘read’ a particular dog to reveal as much as they could about the dog and its job. Heidi Hanley was presented with a diabetic detection dog but determined it was a search and rescue dog. Salvatore Trimboli was presented with a therapy dog but was unsure in his ‘reading’. Debbie Malone was presented with a cane toad detecting dog but determined it was a farm dog. Greg Riley was presented with a quarantine dog but determined it was a movie dog. Katrina Cavanough was presented with a film and TV dog but determined it was a search and rescue dog. None of the contestants was correct in this test.

Test 2 - “Psychic Triathlon". Contests were taken to a beach and given a series of tasks to demonstrate their claimed abilities.

Round 1. Each was asked to determine which of five small huts contained which of each of the other four contestants, and which hut was empty. Katrina Cavanough scored 0 out of 5. Debbie Malone scored 2 out of 5. Greg Riley scored 5 out of 5. Salvatore Trimboli scored 0 out of 5. Heidi Hanley scored 0 out of 5. Salvatore Trimboli advanced to the next round in a tie-break.

Round 2. Contestants were asked to ‘divine’ the location of their personal items buried in the sand. None were able to find them, but Debbie Malone and Salvatore Trimboli were closest and so advanced to the next round.

Round 3. The two remaining contestants were asked to predict which of the other contestants was calling them (at random) on a cell phone before picking it up. Debbie Malone was right 4 times out of 4, Salvatore Trimboli was right 2 times out of 4.

Test 3. “Speed Reading” This was run with contestants doing readings to members of the studio audience.

Katrina Cavanough was eliminated at the end of this episode.

Episode 7, broadcast 18 November 2011

Test 1 - “Coffee Cups” This was run with contestants doing readings of members of the studio audience using coffee cups instead of the more traditional tea leaves.

Test 2 - “Norfolk Island Ghosts” Contestants were flown to Norfolk Island (offshore from NSW) to see if they could pick up any information in an allegedly haunted house and a nearby well, into which in the 1800s, a newborn baby was thrown. Despite a statement made by host Andrew Daddo that contestants were not told about the location, they did during time recorded on the island mention the names of people who lived in the house, so at least some local information apparently was given to them.

Test 3 - “Celebrity Readings” Contestants were asked to relay information about a guest celebrity they sat next to on the main stage, however they could not see them, as they were behind a screen. Celebrities had a giant buzzer to press every time the contestant made a correct statement about them. Singer Jessica Mauboy was being read by Heidi Hanley, Brynne Edelsten was read by Debbie Malone, Tim Ross was read by Salvatore Trimboli and Nick Bracks was read by Greg Riley. Contestants had mixed results of hits and misses.

Salvatore Trimboli was eliminated at the end of this episode.

Episode 8, broadcast 15 November 2011

Test 1 - “Gold Rush”. Seven boxes were placed on pedestals on the main stage. Three of the boxes contained a bar of gold, four were empty. Contestants were asked to use their claimed powers to detect which boxes contained the gold. Debbie Malone chose two boxes correctly, Heidi Hanley chose no box correctly, Greg Riley chose two boxes correctly.

Test 2 - “Find Kerry Whelan”. Contestants were taken to a rural property where it is thought the remains of Kerry Whelan, who was presumed murdered in 1997, are located. Their task was to locate the remains. None of the contestants were able to do so.

The winner of the series was decided by the audience in a phone-in poll, with Greg Riley receiving the most votes.

== Controversy ==
The show was controversial for content shown in the final episode of season 1, featuring a hunt for the body of murder victim Peter Falconio. The stunt was condemned by Colne Valley MP Kali Mountford, who had worked with the Falconio family, with "Some reality shows are worthwhile and show people having a laugh, but there is nothing funny about such a personal, terrible tragedy." The search for Falconio was additionally criticized by the eventual winner Charmaine Wilson as being "in bad taste".

All of the tests followed conditions discussed with Richard Saunders, who was the secretary for the Australian Skeptic Society and a judge on the show. Saunders stated that the contestants "failed over 94% of the time" and "none of them did anything paranormal".
