= Reactions to the fall of Kabul (2021) =

International reactions following the fall of Kabul in August 2021

On 15 August 2021, the city of Kabul, the capital of the Islamic Republic of Afghanistan, was captured by Taliban forces during the 2021 Taliban offensive, concluding the War in Afghanistan that began in 2001. The fall of Kabul provoked a range of reactions across the globe, including debates on whether to recognize the Taliban as the government of Afghanistan, on the humanitarian situation in the country, on the outcome of the War, and the role of military interventionism in world affairs.

== Reactions within Afghanistan ==
Former Afghan president Hamid Karzai pressed publicly for a peaceful transition of power, promising he would remain in Kabul with his daughters. At around 11:00 Afghan Time, President Ashraf Ghani released a statement saying that he had fled in an attempt to avoid a bloody battle and that "the Taliban have won with the judgement of their swords and guns".

Afghan author Khaled Hosseini shared his concerns over the future of women's rights in Afghanistan, and expressed his hope that the Taliban would not return to the "violence and cruelty" of the 1990s. On 19 August, journalist Ali M. Latifi argued that "once again, the Afghan people have awoken to an Independence Day dripping with irony, contradictions, and unease".

Ahmad Sarmast, director of the Afghanistan National Institute of Music, stated that the previous Taliban regime had turned Afghanistan into "a silent nation" and he feared the Taliban shutting the Institute down, which would make Afghanistan "a society without music, it would be a dead society". Sahraa Karimi, film director and chairperson of the Afghan Film Organization, publicly shared her account of escaping Kabul in a video that went viral: "I went to the bank to get some money, they closed and evacuated. I still cannot believe this happened... They are coming to kill us". After missing a flight to Ukraine on which the Slovak film academy had secured a place for her due to the crowds, she was later able to board a flight. After arriving in safety, she began organising attempts to secure an escape for other filmmakers in Afghanistan, warning that the Taliban could perpetuate "genocide of filmmakers and artists".

Khalida Popal, former Afghanistan women's national football team captain, stated that "it's traumatising for my generation to see history repeating itself". Samiullah Shinwari of the Afghanistan national cricket team stated that 15 August was "the day Afghans lost their country and the whole world just watched". Several members of the national cricket team also spoke out against the Taliban and posted pictures of the Islamic Republic of Afghanistan flag on Afghan Independence Day.

The fall of Kabul sparked a number of protests in Afghanistan, organised especially by Islamic democrats and Islamic feminists. It also saw the formation of the anti-Taliban National Resistance Front of Afghanistan and the beginning of the Panjshir conflict. National Resistance Front of Afghanistan leader Ahmad Massoud warned of civil war, arguing that "we confronted the Soviet Union, and we will be able to confront the Taliban".

On 9 August 2021, #SanctionPakistan became one of the top Twitter trends in Afghanistan and worldwide, with Afghans holding Pakistan responsible for its support of the Taliban.

On the other hand, the fall of Kabul and the republic was welcomed in some regions such as Helmand Province, which had experienced large scale bombardments and suffering during the war.

== International governments ==
=== Africa ===
- South Africa: The Department of International Relations and Cooperation (Dirco) stated that contact had been established with South African nationals stranded in Afghanistan through the South African High Commission to Pakistan, which is also responsible for diplomatic relations with Afghanistan, and that efforts to ensure their safety and provide consular assistance were underway. The South African government expressed concern at the plight of the thousands of Afghans displaced by the worsening security situation and called on "the authority in power to ensure that the rule of law, human rights and the safety of all Afghans and foreign nationals alike are protected", further calling on "all military and security groups" to exercise restraint and seek negotiations aimed at the restoration of stability and a legitimate government.
- Uganda: Kampala announced that they are willing to accept 2,000 Afghan refugees.

=== Americas ===
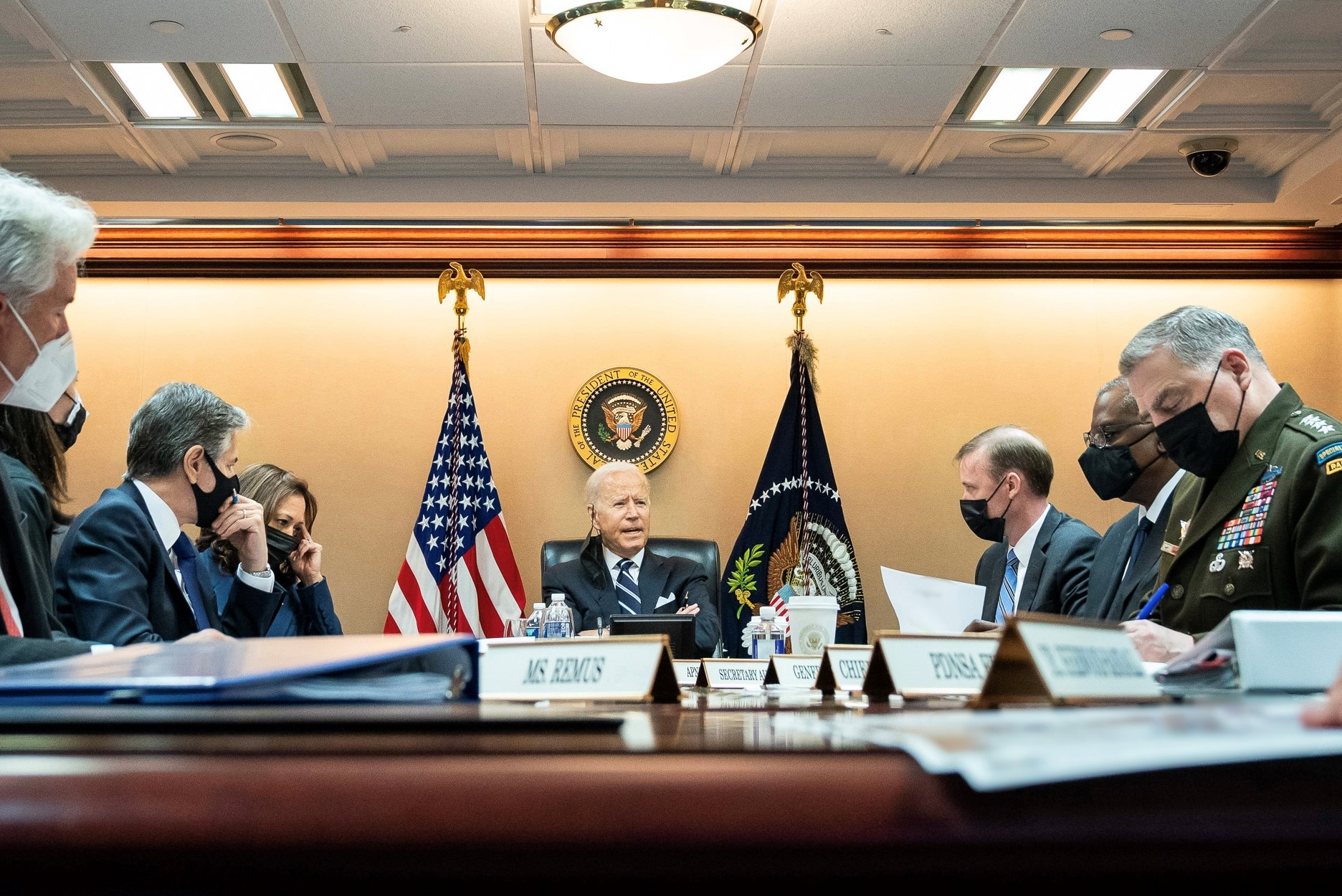
US president Joe Biden discussing the fall of Kabul with the National Security Council, 18 August 2021

- Argentina: The Argentine Ministry of Foreign Affairs called on all parties to restore order and open dialogue while urging the Taliban to respect human rights. The Foreign Ministry also urged the Taliban to allow those wishing to leave Afghanistan to do so and for humanitarian aid to reach the population.
- Bolivia: The Bolivian Ministry of Foreign Affairs expressed its concern over the latest events in Afghanistan, calling on all parties to avoid all kinds of aggression against the people and to protect the lives of civilians above all else, as well as to seek peaceful solutions to differences. The Bolivian government urges the new authorities in Afghanistan to protect the lives of those who live in its territory, restoring security and civil order, but always respecting international human rights law, as well as international humanitarian law.
- Brazil: The Brazilian Ministry of Foreign Affairs expressed concern about the growing instability not only in Afghanistan but in the whole Central Asian region. The country called for a rapid engagement of the UN Security Council, expressing total support for the United Nations Assistance Mission in Afghanistan (UNAMA).
- Canada: The Canadian government announced that it would be suspending its embassy operations in Afghanistan. An undisclosed number of soldiers from Canadian Special Operations Forces Command were dispatched to assist with the evacuation and closure of the embassy. The Canadian Armed Forces also dispatched two C-130 Hercules and a C-17 Globemaster III to Kuwait to assist with the evacuations. The Canadian government stated it would take in up to 20,000 Afghan refugees facing threats from the Taliban.
- Chile: The Chilean Ministry of Foreign Affairs promotes and supports the declarations of the Regional Conference on Women in Latin America and the Caribbean, in which the importance "of the urgent protection of the human rights of women and girls in Afghanistan" is mentioned. In turn, the Chilean government announced that it will receive in its territory at least 10 Afghan families that are mainly made up of women human rights defenders.
- Paraguay: The Paraguayan Ministry of Foreign Affairs signed a joint declaration with twenty other countries in support of the defense of the main human rights in Afghanistan. The document expresses "deep concern" for the right to education, the right to work and the right to freedom of movement of Afghan women and girls. Likewise, the Senate of Paraguay met to approve a draft declaration, in which the violence originating from Taliban men in Afghanistan has been “strongly” condemned. The Paraguayan senators called on all nations of the world to show their willingness to receive Afghan refugees and to stop any deportation.
- United States: US president Joe Biden stated that the continuing presence of American troops in Afghanistan "would not have made a difference" if the Afghan military was unable to maintain control of the country.
- Uruguay: The Ministry of Foreign Relations expressed concern about "the rapid deterioration of the situation in Afghanistan", and called on all parties to respect "strictly and completely the obligations of international humanitarian law", and the political actors to respect "the necessary efforts to guarantee the respect and protection of human rights and fundamental freedoms of the entire Afghan population".

=== Asia ===
- China: "The disaster in Afghanistan was caused by the US and its allies," said the Chinese state-run Global Times. The Communist Party People's Daily flatteringly credited the Taliban's victory to its supposed adoption of Mao Zedong's "people's war" tactic: rallying the support of the rural population, while drawing the enemy deep into the countryside.
- India: India evacuated its ambassador and diplomatic staff from its embassy in Kabul. The Indian government also made arrangements for bringing back its nationals.
- Indonesia: The Indonesian government stated they are monitoring the situation in Afghanistan and stated readiness to evacuate from Afghanistan if needed. The Indonesian Embassy in Kabul would be maintained. On 20 August 2021, Indonesian Air Force evacuated 26 of its citizens.
- Iran: President Ebrahim Raisi said "American military defeat and its withdrawal must become an opportunity to restore life, security and durable peace in Afghanistan. Iran backs efforts to restore stability in Afghanistan and, as a neighbouring and brother nation, Iran invites all groups in Afghanistan to reach a national agreement."
- Iraqi Foreign Minister Fuad Hussein stressed, on August 24, that the issue of Baghdad's recognition of the Afghan Taliban movement is "premature", while he spoke about Iraq's fears that the Taliban's movements might inspire the rest of the terrorist organizations to operate in the region. On the issue of evacuating Iraqi citizens, he said "We do not have diplomats and we do not have an Iraq community in Afghanistan".
- Japan: The Japanese Ministry of Defense announced the dispatching of one Kawasaki C-2 from Miho Air Base on 23 August and two C-130s from Komaki Base on 24 August to evacuate Japanese and Afghan staff members working in the Japanese Embassy. Defense Minister Nobuo Kishi said that the dispatch was made under Article 84 of the Self-Defense Forces Law. JGSDF and JASDF personnel heading to Afghanistan would be allowed to use small arms to defend themselves under the SDF Law due to the security situation in Kabul. Most of their diplomats were evacuated on 15 August to Turkey. On 26 August 2021, a Boeing 777-300ER under the Japanese Air Force One callsign was dispatched to Islamabad to prepare to evacuate refugees. By 27 August 2021, 1 Japanese nationals and 14 Afghan nationals were successfully evacuated, but none of the local staff members were able to be evacuated.
- Kazakhstan: The Kazakh Ministry of Foreign Affairs said that the embassy would continue operating in Kabul, noting that a small number of staff work at the embassy. President Kassym-Jomart Tokayev stated that Kazakhstan would closely follow the development of events in Afghanistan and that measures would take place to ensure the safety of its citizens and diplomats within the country.
- Malaysia: The Malaysian High Commission in India (which is accredited to Afghanistan) has urged citizens remaining in Afghanistan to register with them and return to Malaysia. The High Commission also confirmed that it had helped a Malaysian national return home earlier in August. It also confirmed that two other Malaysian nationals working for an international relief organisation had opted to remain in Kabul.
- Nepal: Nepal has pleaded countries which had a diplomatic presence in Afghanistan to assist it in repatriating its citizens from that country.
- Pakistan: Prime Minister Imran Khan said that the Afghans had broken the "shackles of slavery" while explaining how Pakistani people had adopted the western culture over their own culture. In an interview to CNN, Imran Khan said "It could go to chaos" referring to the situation in Afghanistan adding that "World should give Taliban time on the human rights." Commenting further on the woman's rights he said: "The best way forward for the peace and stability is to engage with the Taliban and incentivise them on issues such as women's rights and inclusive government. Afghan women are strong so give them time they will get their rights." Imran khan also showed concern over the refugees pouring into the Pakistan as a result of chaos in Afghanistan and said "We can not take anymore refugees, there are already more than 3 million refugees in Pakistan". Pakistan International Airline played vital role at Kabul International Airport by evacuating about 1400 people as of August 14, including diplomats, foreign media and Afghan journalists and staff of international organisations which were stuck after the Taliban takeover. Pakistan Air force also sent 3 C130 cargo planes containing humanitarian aid to reduce the food and medical supply shortage faced by the people of Islamic Emirate of Afghanistan. Pakistan Intelligence Agency's (ISI) chief Faiz Hameed visited Kabul and met with Taliban leadership as well as other Afghan leaders including former prime minister Gulbuddin Hekmatyar. The meeting was seen as an unconventional means of contact between the two countries in the absence of a government in Afghanistan. The visit was purportedly to get berths for the Haqqanis in the new Government, demonstrating their, "clout" over the Taliban. According to the Carnegie Endowment Center, the Inter-Services Intelligence Directorate shares an undeniable link with the Taliban, especially the Haqqani group. Hameed later held a meeting in Islamabad with his counterparts from Russia, China, Tajikistan and other Central Asian countries to discuss the situation of Afghanistan after the Taliban takeover. Commercial flights to Kabul are also temporarily halted by the Pakistan International Airline. At the SCO summit, Imran Khan said "The Taliban must fulfil the pledges made, above all for an inclusive political structure where all ethnic groups are represented. This is vital for Afghanistan's stability", adding regarding the economic condition in Afghanistan after the Taliban takeover, he said "We must remember that the previous government depended heavily on foreign aid and its removal could lead to economic collapse"
- Philippines: The Philippines began repatriating its citizens on a mandatory basis from Afghanistan. It also pledged that it would accept refugees from Afghanistan.
- Singapore: Singapore had sent its Airbus A330 MRTT aircraft to transport evacues from Qatar to Germany on 26 August, after offering it during a state visit by US vice president Kamala Harris on 23 August.
- Tajikistan: President Emomali Rahmon said that he will not recognize a Taliban-led government if it ignores the interests of various ethnic minorities, including Afghan Tajiks.
- Turkey: Turkish Foreign Minister Mevlüt Çavuşoğlu said that "Turkey was in talks with all parties in Afghanistan, including the Taliban", and "views positively the messages the Islamist militants have sent since taking control of the country". The Ministry also said that the Turkish embassy in Kabul would continue to function and is not expected to close.
- Uzbekistan: The Uzbek government said that its embassy would continue working in Afghanistan with no plans in evacuating its ambassadors and that it would instead negotiate both with the remaining Afghan government and Taliban on the issues of refugees.

=== Europe ===
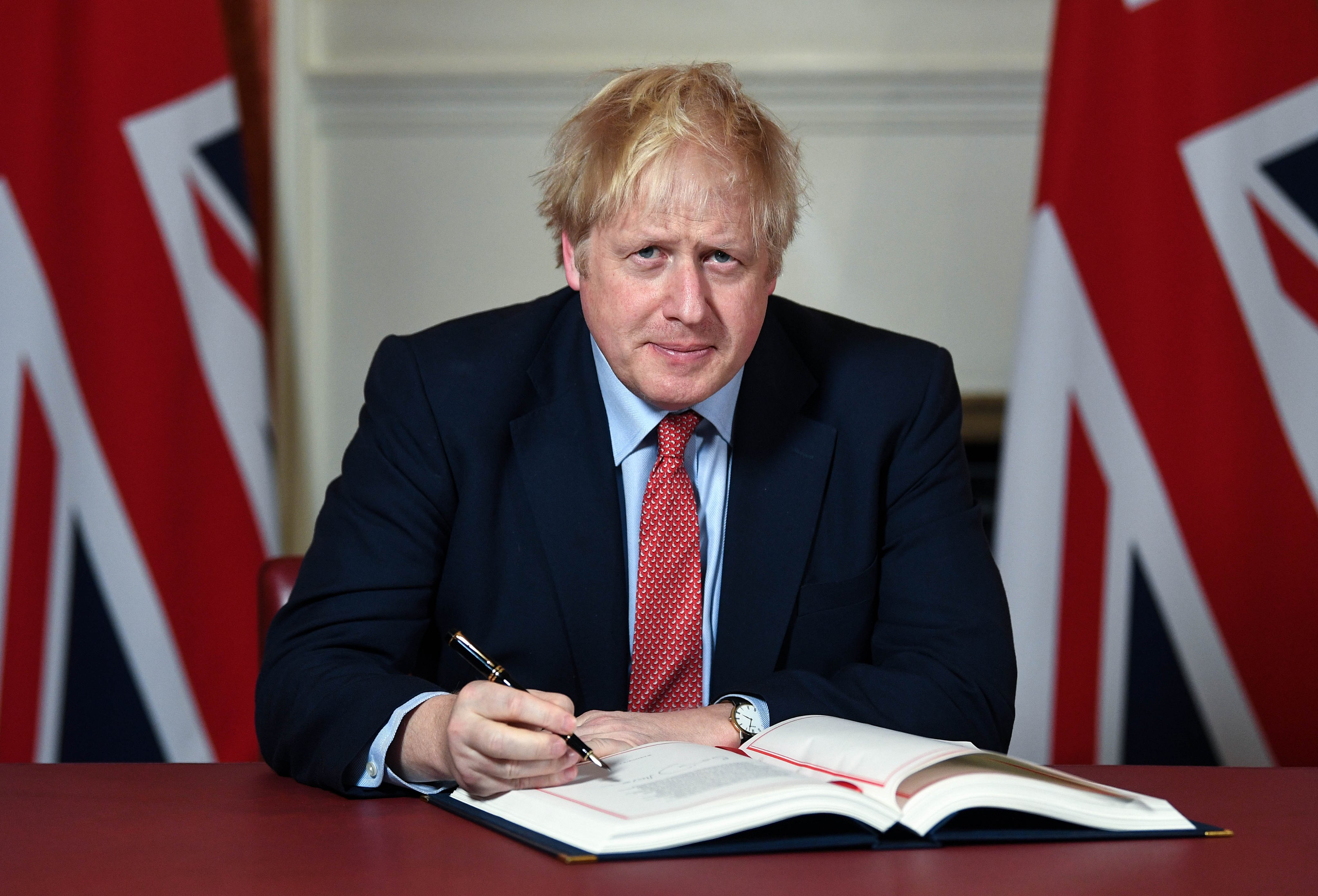
UK prime minister Boris Johnson blamed the United States for the Taliban's rapid takeover of Afghanistan.

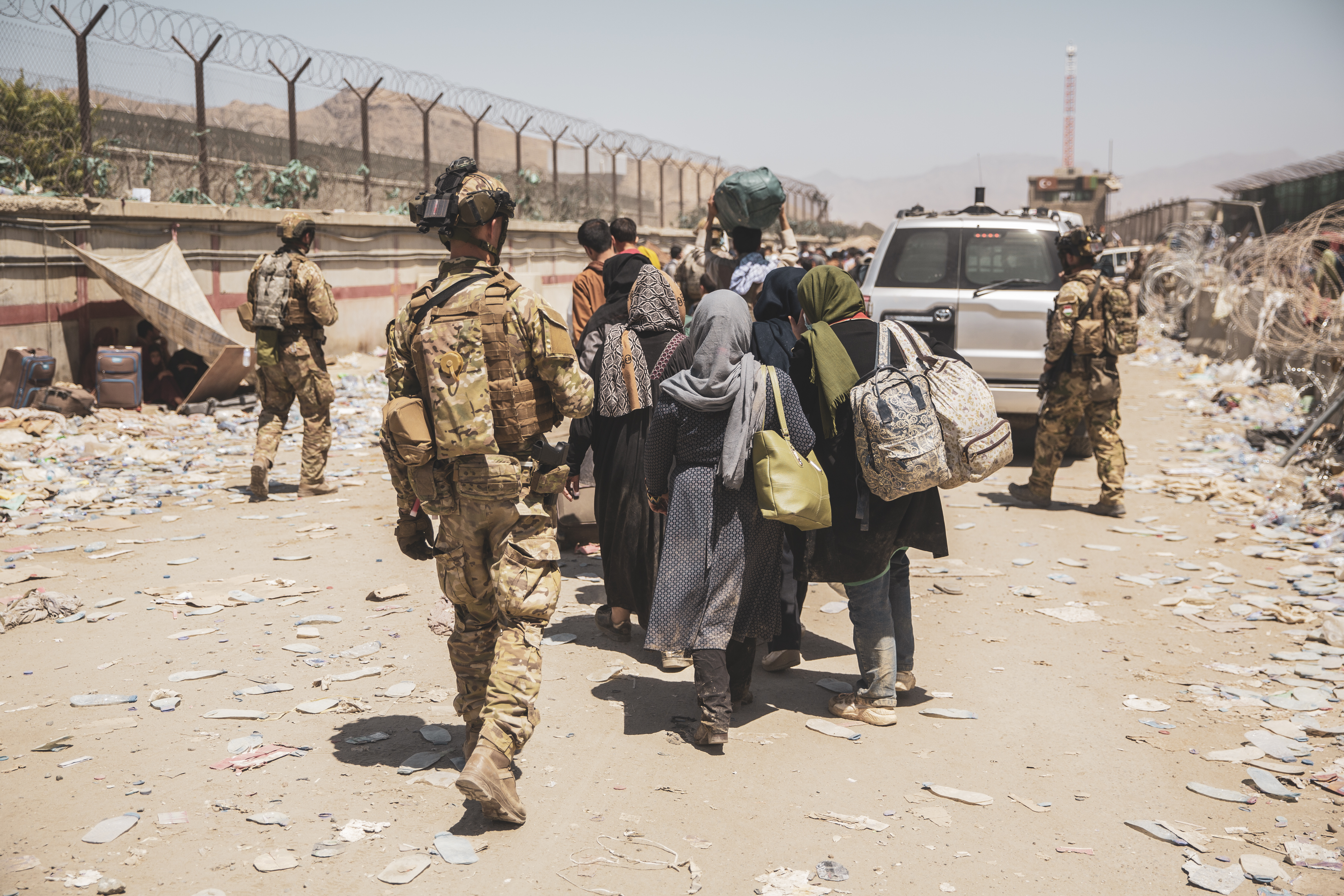
Italian soldiers escort Afghan evacuees in Kabul during the 2021 Kabul airlifts, 24 August 2021

- Austria: Austrian foreign minister, Alexander Schallenberg, warned that "conflict and instability in the region will sooner or later spill over to Europe".
- Denmark: Foreign Minister Jeppe Kofod said that Denmark would decide to temporarily close its embassy in Afghanistan, and that the situation in Kabul was serious, and that it would make an extra effort for those who have stood side by side with Denmark.
- Estonia: On 17 August, Prime Minister Kaja Kallas stated that "the chaos in Afghanistan continues to shock the democratic world" and indicated that the country was prepared to offer asylum to ten people. On 19 August, the Estonian government increased the number of refugees it was willing to take in to 30.
- Finland: According to Minister for Foreign Affairs Pekka Haavisto, the Finnish Embassy in Kabul has been closed and all of its Finnish staff evacuated from Afghanistan. In Mid August 2021 Finland has reduced its development cooperation funding to Afghanistan and continues support through the UN, international organizations, and civil society groups due to the Taliban's takeover.
- France: The French government announced that it would be holding an emergency defence council meeting on 16 August presided by President Emmanuel Macron to address the situation. Minister of Europe and Foreign Affairs Jean-Yves Le Drian stated with the rapid deterioration of the situation in the country, the Ministry decided to move their embassy to Kabul airport, in order to proceed with the evacuation of the totality of French diplomats in the city. The Minister of the Armed Forces Florence Parly by the demand of the French president Emmanuel Macron, sent a C130J and A400M of the French Air and Space Force to conduct the evacuation, with support of the French military based in the United Arab Emirates at Camp de la Paix.
- Ireland: The Taoiseach Micheál Martin stated on 16 August that he found the situation in Afghanistan "deeply worrying". He stated his support for a statement made by the UN secretary general which asked for restraint from the Taliban and stressed himself the need for all sides of the conflict to follow international law.
- Italy: The Ministry of Foreign Affairs and the Ministry of Defence sent C-130 and KC-767 aircraft of the Italian Air Force to proceed with the evacuation of Italian diplomats and citizens, along with many Afghan collaborators and their families. An envoy remained at Kabul Airport protected by Carabinieri and an airbridge had been arranged. Within the Operation Aquila Omnia, 5,011 people were evacuated from the city of Kabul.
- Norway: Norway announced that it is closing its embassy in Kabul and the Foreign Affairs Minister Ine Marie Eriksen Søreide said that "there's been a major worsening of the security situation in Afghanistan that first and foremost affects the civilian population".
- Romania: On 14 August, as the situation in Afghanistan worsened, the Ministry of Foreign Affairs of Romania urged all Romanian citizens in Afghanistan to "leave the country immediately" and to avoid any trip to Afghanistan. Two days later, on 16 August, the Prime Minister of Romania Florin Cîțu said there were still 35 Romanian citizens in Afghanistan and that a plane would be sent to take them back to Romania.
- Russia: The Russian embassy in Kabul stated that it would not evacuate or close the embassy, with a Taliban spokesperson guaranteeing the embassy's safety. The Russian government further stated that talks were underway to hold an emergency U.N. Security Council meeting to discuss the situation. On August 25, 2021, Moscow ordered the deployment of four military transport planes to evacuate Russians and citizens of Belarus, Kyrgyzstan, Tajikistan, Uzbekistan and Ukraine. Russian Diplomat Zamir Kabulov stated "We have prepared the ground for a conversation with the new government in Afghanistan in advance as an asset of Russian foreign policy
- Spain: The Spanish government is preparing to evacuate the Afghans who worked for Spain's military and civilian operations and European Union missions. The Spanish Air Force already has an A400M transport plane ready to pick up the evacuees in Kabul as soon as the command is issued, which should come no later than 30 August. The interior ministry will "process" any application for international protection made by Afghan translators and others who worked for Spanish forces after they arrive in Spain, rather than refugee status. On 20 August, Prime Minister Sánchez offered Spain as the hub for Afghans who collaborated with EU, which would later be settled in various countries, creating a temporary refugee camp in the air base of Torrejón de Ardoz. US President Joe Biden spoke with Sánchez to allow the use of the military bases of Rota and Morón to temporarily accommodate Afghan refugees, while praising "Spain's leadership in seeking international support for Afghan women and girls".
- Sweden: Ann Linde, Swedish minister for foreign affairs, stated that the collapse of the Afghan government had "gone much faster than anyone had expected". Public broadcaster Sveriges Radio further reported that the Swedish embassy was evacuating its staff.

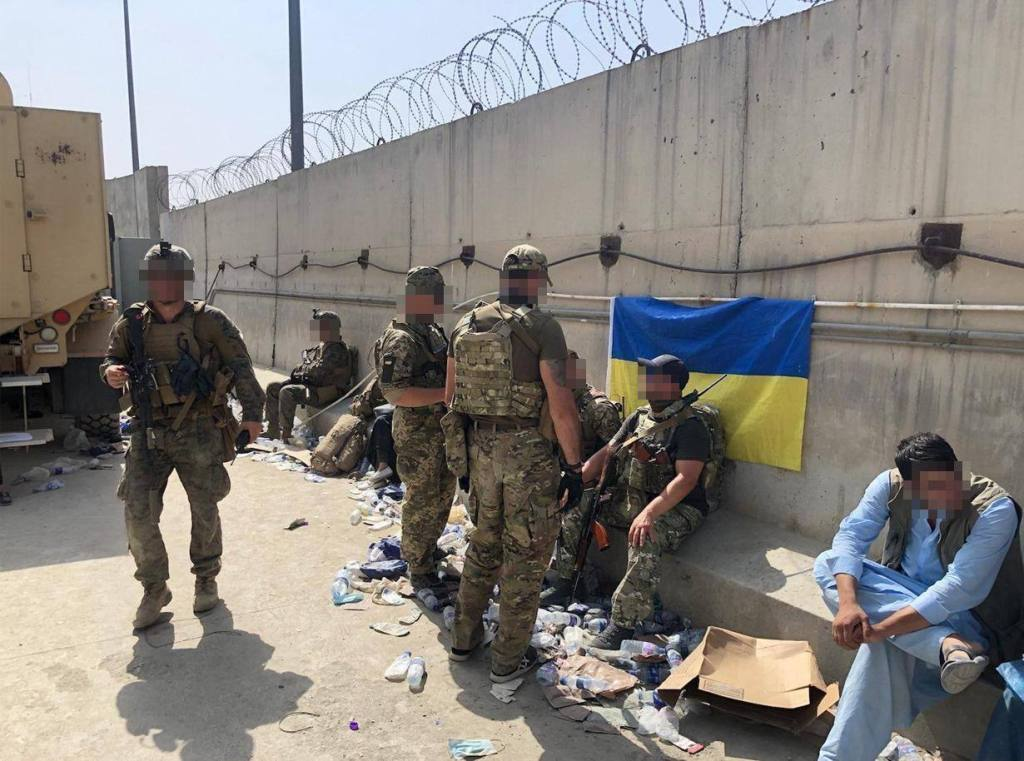
Ukrainian HUR MO special operations personnel during the airlift

- Ukraine: President Volodymyr Zelenskyy announced that 80 people including Afghan citizens themselves whom applied for refugee status were evacuated from Afghanistan, citing that "Ukraine will always come to the aid of its citizens, no matter what happens in the world". The ministry of foreign affairs urged any of the remaining Ukrainians who feel unsafe to contact the ministry or the embassies in the neighbouring countries of Tajikistan or Pakistan.
- United Kingdom: Prime Minister Boris Johnson announced that he would be recalling parliament to debate the situation. In the afternoon of 15 August, an emergency COBR meeting was held, followed by a public statement from Johnson where he stated that the situation was "extremely difficult" and that "we've known for a long time this was the way things would go". Johnson further stated that the international community should not recognise the Taliban government and that it was necessary to "prevent Afghanistan lapsing back into being a breeding ground for terror".
- Vatican City: Pope Francis expressed his concern over the conflict in Afghanistan and called for dialogue so that the "battered population" can live in peace.

=== Oceania ===
- Australia: The Australian government deployed 250 soldiers and three aircraft to aid in evacuations. However, Australian prime minister Scott Morrison stated that "despite our best efforts, I know that support won't reach all that it should" and Minister of Defence Peter Dutton stated that "we won't be landing aircraft into the airport until it's safe to do so". Morrison, Dutton and Foreign Minister Marise Payne also called on the Taliban to "cease all violence against civilians and adhere to international humanitarian law and the human rights all Afghans are entitled to expect, in particular women and girls".
- New Zealand: Prime Minister Jacinda Ardern and New Zealand Defence Force chief Air Marshal Kevin Short have announced that New Zealand would deploy 40 troops to evacuate 53 New Zealanders and 37 Afghans who had worked for the NZ military along with their nuclear families.

== International organisations ==
The World Food Programme stated that as many as 14 million Afghans could face a food crisis after the Taliban victory, as Afghanistan was suffering a severe drought simultaneously to the political turmoil and ongoing COVID-19 pandemic in Afghanistan. UNESCO released a statement calling for "the preservation of Afghanistan's cultural heritage in its diversity" and for measures to be taken to "protect cultural heritage from damage and looting". Unicef representative (Sam Mort) was cautiously hopeful that the organisation's relatively new arrangement with the Taliban to develop girls education could be retained.

The European Union's Vice-President of the European Commission, Margaritis Schinas, expressed concerns of a possible migratory crisis. High Representative of the Union for Foreign Affairs and Security Policy Josep Borrell argued that the fall showed that Europe needed military capacity independent of the US and called for the creation of "a 50,000-strong expeditionary force" under EU command.

The World Health Organization said that it was "extremely concerned over the unfolding safety and humanitarian needs in the country, including risk of disease outbreaks and rise in COVID-19 transmission".

The World Bank followed the International Monetary Fund in suspending financial aid to the country, along with US banking system freezing any holdings, this may mean assets of at least $9bn and potential reserves due of $440million are now frozen.

== Reactions from the international public ==
=== International protests ===
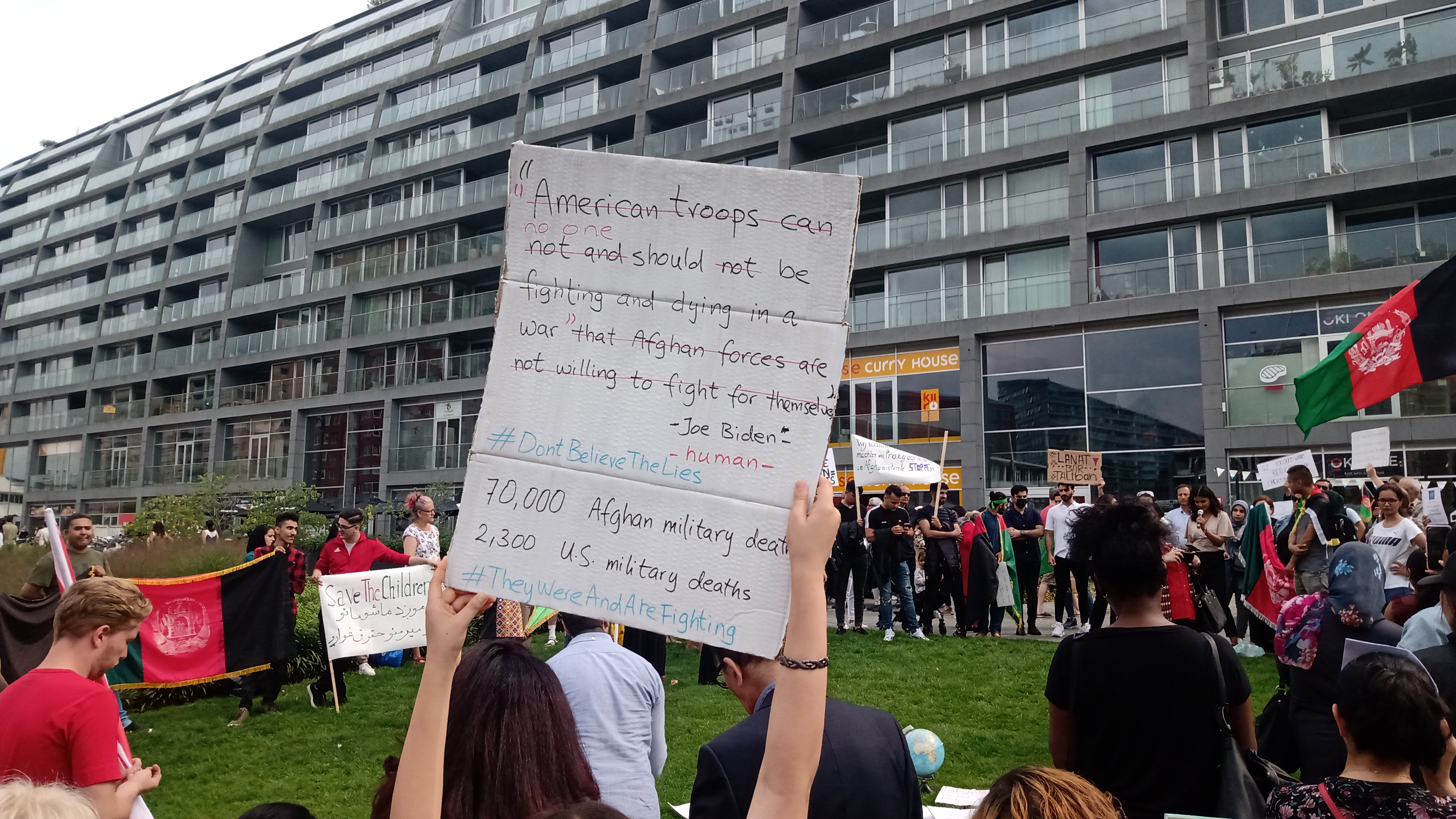
Protest in Rotterdam against the Taliban's takeover, 21 August 2021

Solidarity protests calling for NATO governments to do more to solve the humanitarian crisis and to oppose the Taliban were held in several countries, including the United States, Turkey, Bulgaria, Spain, and France. Small protests were held in several Canadian cities in the week after the fall, including Mississauga, Montréal, and Calgary. A solidarity protest was also held by Afghans stuck in the Kara Tepe refugee camp on Lesbos, Greece.

On 23 August, a demonstration was held in front of the Althing in Iceland calling for the Icelandic government to take in more refugees.

On 24 August, Afghan refugees living in Jakarta staged protests against the Taliban takeover of Kabul and called on the UNHCR to help them get settled in other countries.

=== Human rights concerns ===
Nobel laureate Malala Yousafzai, who had survived a Pakistani Taliban assassination attempt in Pakistan in 2012, stated that she was in "complete shock" and was "deeply worried about women, minorities and human rights advocates".

Human Rights Watch stated that "standing beside Afghan women in their struggle, and finding tools to pressure the Taliban and the political will to do so, is the least—the very least—the international community could do".

Amnesty International stated that the situation was "a tragedy that should have been foreseen and averted" and called for governments to "take every necessary measure to ensure the safe passage out of Afghanistan for all those at risk of being targeted by the Taliban".

Médecins Sans Frontières stated that it was "concerned about access to healthcare for everyone" and that "our teams are staying put, providing essential medical care to people across the country".

Reporters Without Borders stated that the Taliban pledge not to target journalists with reprisals "clearly suffers from a lack of credibility because the Taliban have an appalling record in this regard" and that "around 100 media outlets have stopped operating since the Taliban's rapid advance began".

In the 2021 fall of Kabul after the withdrawal of American troops, and the fear to women and girls, caused by the Taliban takeover of government, CARE International's deputy country director, Marianne O'Grady said CARE were continuing their work, and was reported as saying that "you cannot uneducate millions of people" and that if women did go "back behind walls" they would educate their "neighbours, cousins and own children" despite Taliban rule. Sam Mort said Unicef work was also continuing in the country.

Some commentators, however, warned against the spike in concern about human rights and women's rights in particular following the fall being used as justification for further military interventionism.

The United Nations Human Rights Council held a special session to address human rights abuses in Afghanistan after the Taliban's takeover. However, the final resolution, drafted by the Organisation of Islamic Cooperation (OIC), was criticized for being watered down. The resolution only asked for an update from the UN human rights commissioner, Michelle Bachelet, with no mention of the Taliban. The OIC-led draft was criticized for failing to establish a fact-finding mission or a stronger mandate for monitoring. The European Union questioned the resolution's effectiveness.

=== Outcome of the War in Afghanistan ===
Many commentators argued that the fall of Kabul meant that NATO had lost the War in Afghanistan.

Former Canadian Chief of the Land Staff Andrew Leslie stated that "where we are now is failure. There's no doubt about it." Mikhail Gorbachev, the former General Secretary of the Communist Party of the Soviet Union who had overseen the Soviet withdrawal from Afghanistan in 1988, argued that "NATO and the United States should have admitted failure earlier" and that the NATO campaign in Afghanistan was "a failed enterprise from the start" which was founded on "the exaggeration of a threat and poorly defined geopolitical ideas".

Some public figures, however, defended the War in Afghanistan. Former Australian prime minister John Howard argued that "we’ve got to remember since we went into Afghanistan there is no evidence that a major terrorist attack has been orchestrated out of Afghanistan". Former British prime minister Tony Blair argued that the decision to withdraw was done "in obedience to an imbecilic political slogan about ending 'the forever wars.'" Former American president George W. Bush released a statement saying that American soldiers "took out a brutal enemy and denied Al Qaeda a safe haven while building schools, sending supplies, and providing medical care". Michael E. O'Hanlon of the Brookings Institution and former American marine Amy McGrath wrote in USA Today that the War "made a major and positive difference for US security" and that it "clearly demonstrated America's will and readiness to fight in defense of its values and its security".

The Guardian reported a mood of "disappointment and despair" among UK soldiers and veterans over the collapse. American veterans of the War also expressed similar sentiments, with the American Department of Defense announcing that it would be offering mental health services to those veterans.

Karen J. Greenberg of Fordham University School of Law wrote in The Nation that, despite the fall of Kabul, the war on terror was not over, that "those forever wars have created a new form of forever law, forever policy, forever power". Other comment reflects back to the 1998 US attack on Sudan (after al-Qaeda attacks on American embassies in Kenya and Tanzania), and UK's 2011 intervention in Libya, and current 'failure of the West' to impose regime change in Afghanistan is "the reality of a war that, in the end, from Sudan to Iraq to Afghanistan, was about high-profile revenge enacted on low-profile soft targets. It was not about ending terror, or freeing women, but demonstrating Infinite Reach [as was the name of the 1998 USA offensive]."

=== Kabul Airport evacuations ===
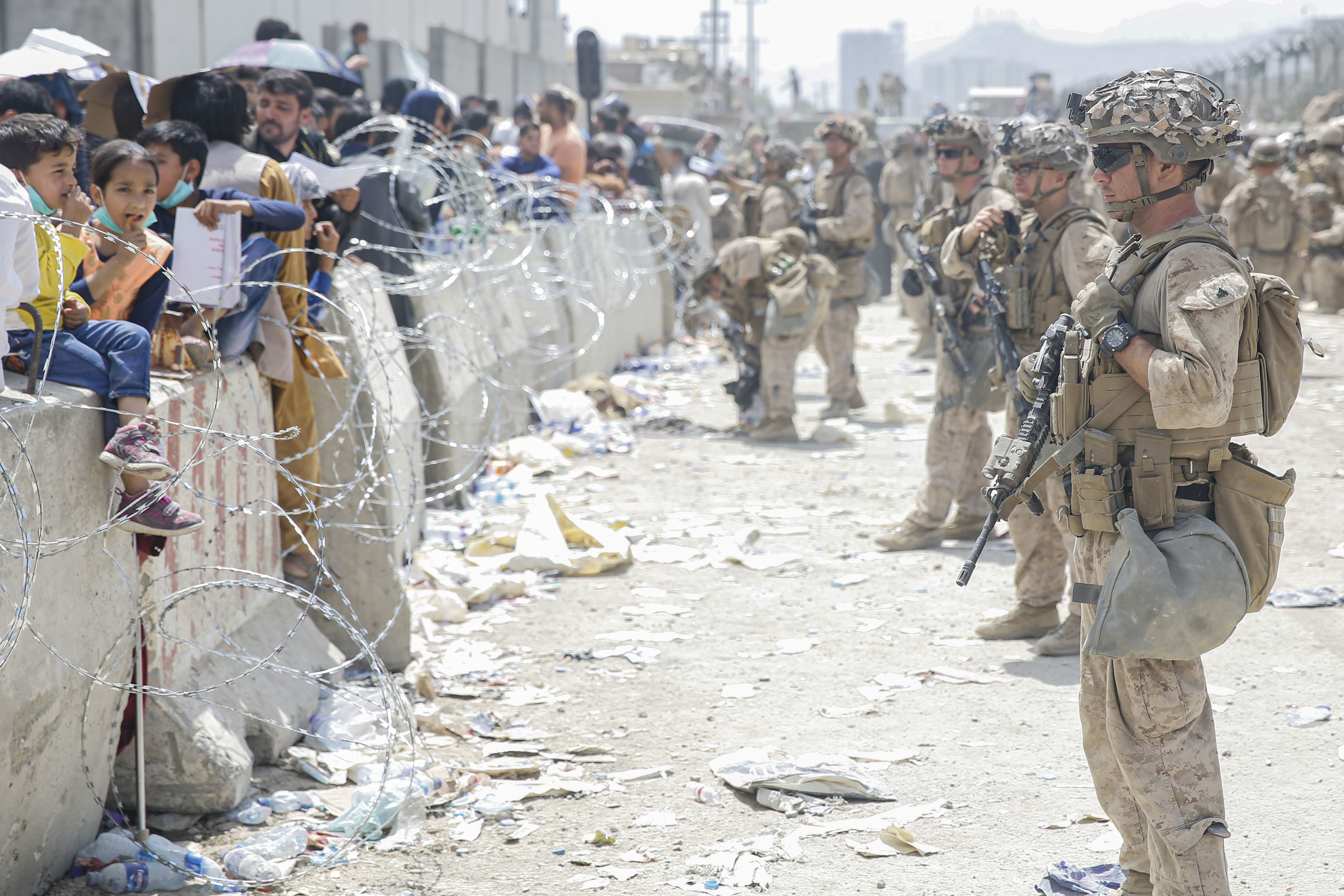
US Marines with SP-MAGTF-CR-CC during the Kabul Airport evacuations, 20 August 2021

The organisation of the evacuation from Kabul Airport was criticised by many. Admiral Chris Barrie, retired Chief of the Defence Force of Australia, criticised the organisation of the evacuations, stating that "we’ve just left it far too late" and predicting reprisals from the Taliban. Former deputy NATO senior civilian representative in Afghanistan Mark Jacobson stated that NATO governments "clearly didn't think that there might be 100,000 people that needed to get out". Former Canadian general Rick Hillier, who commanded the International Security Assistance Force in Afghanistan in 2004, called for NATO forces to go outside of the airport to find and escort vulnerable people to evacuations, arguing that "it will be impossible for the vast majority of them to get to Kabul airport and get on a plane".

Not Left Behind, a Canadian group advocating to help Afghans who had worked with Canadian forces to resettle in Canada, stated that "I think that all Western countries that played a role in Afghanistan have a responsibility to step up and support the humanitarian impact of our actions in those countries".

=== Role of NATO in world affairs ===
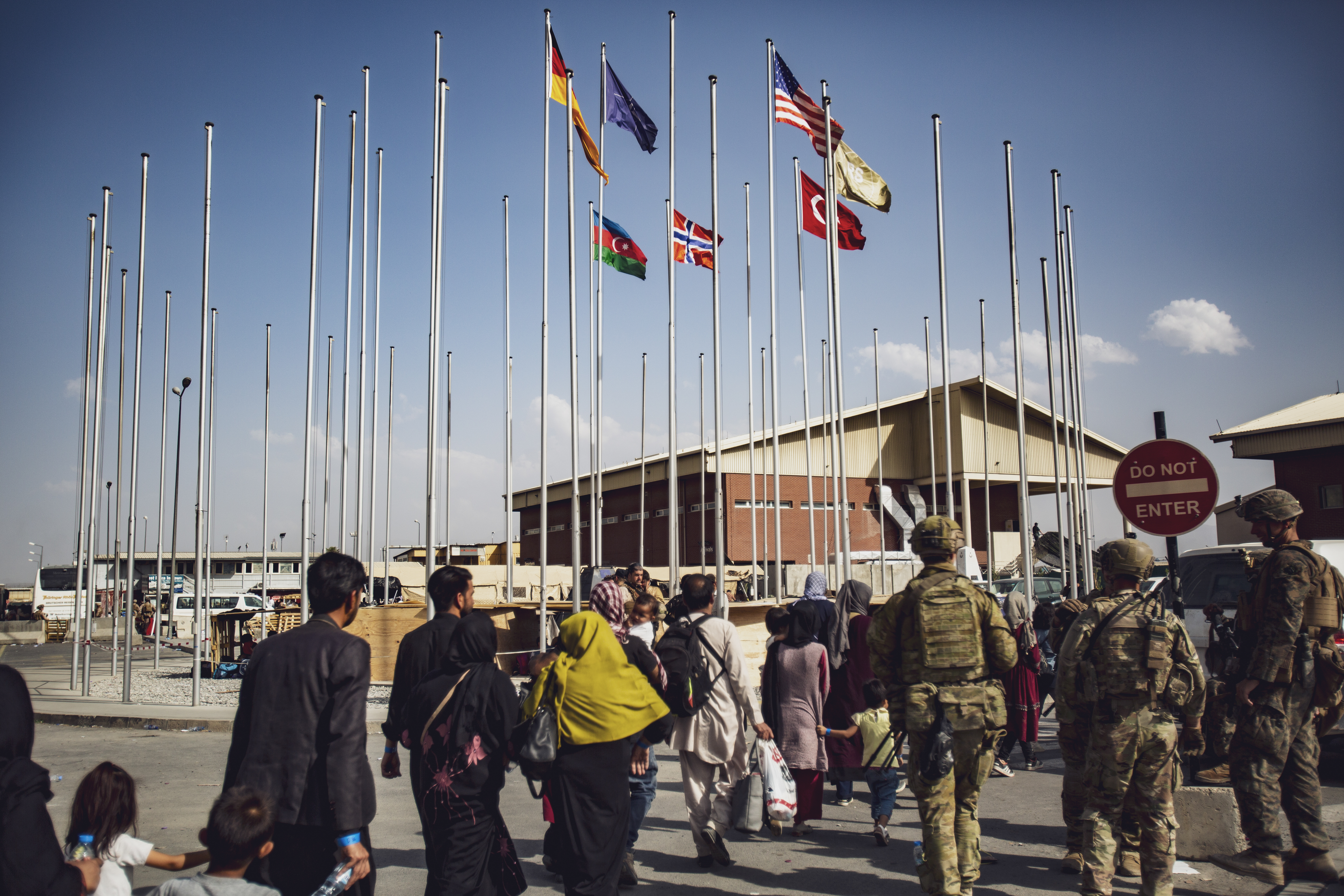
US troops assisting Afghan evacuees at a military terminal in Kabul Airport, 23 August 2021. The flags of NATO members, and the flag of Operation Resolute Support, can be seen.

The collapse has provoked debates about the role of NATO militaries and Transatlantic relations in world affairs. Journalist Simon Jenkins argued that the responsibility to protect doctrine that arose after the end of the Cold War led to a decline in UN authority "and the UN gave way to the US as a self-declared policeman".

Journalist Owen Jones wrote in The Guardian that "Britain has not had a foreign policy independent of the United States since the 1950s" and that "if historians of the future wish to understand the ignorance and hubris that accompanied the decline of the west's power, this week's emergency parliamentary debate on Afghanistan will provide an insightful case study". The Guardian reported that senior UK civil servants were admitting in Whitehall meetings that they had little intelligence capacity in Afghanistan beyond that provided to them by the US.

The collapse provoked increase debates on the foreign and defence policy of the European Union, including calls for the EU to develop its own military and increased independence from United States foreign policy. Max Bergmann of the Center for American Progress argued that Europe has to be "able to act when the U.S. is uninterested in doing so" and that transatlantic burden-sharing needed to be shifted away from American leadership into a more balanced partnership. Bastian Giegerich of the International Institute for Strategic Studies argued that the collapse "shows crystal clear that Germany and other European powers don't have the means to pursue an independent strategy."

American interventionism came under particular scrutiny. Jon Alterman of the Center for Strategic and International Studies wrote in The Hill that "the stories that will resonate overseas are the stories of Afghans who once cast their lot with the United States and now find themselves cast aside". Robert Manning of the Atlantic Council argued that "before the next US missionary adventure, we should consider the cost in global credibility of the terrible US foreign policy legacy of failed interventions" but that "betting against US resilience is not wise". Torek Farhadi, former advisor to Hamid Karzai, argued that "nobody knows what the US was doing in Afghanistan for the past 10 years" and that "the US tolerated corruption in Afghanistan. The American public was too remote from this to really know what is going on." Michael Klare of Hampshire College, however, wrote in The Nation that an American retreat from Central Asia might not disadvantage the US in global geopolitics, as "conducting low-intensity conflicts in the heart of Eurasia has never been a winning strategy for the United States; rather, it excels at high-tech coalition warfare in Europe and sea-based operations in the Pacific."

Media in China compared the situation in Afghanistan to the United States' relations with Taiwan. It questioned the former's commitment to defend the latter if China decides to take control of Taiwan, which it claims to be its province, by force. Security Council of Russia secretary Nikolai Patrushev compared the situation to Ukraine–United States relations, stating that "a similar situation awaits supporters of the American choice in Ukraine".

== Impact on international governments ==
In the UK, Foreign Secretary Dominic Raab faced calls to resign after it was revealed he had gone on holiday to Greece just prior to the fall and had refused attempts to contact him as developments occurred. On 18 August, British prime minister Boris Johnson told the House of Commons that there would not be an official inquiry into the UK's role in the war. On 21 August, The Guardian reported that the Intelligence and Security Committee of Parliament was likely to launch its own inquiry into UK intelligence assessments of the situation. On 23 August, The Daily Telegraph reported that the British government was considering criminalising travel to Afghanistan to prevent UK citizens from joining terrorist groups. The fall of Afghanistan also had a negative impact on United Kingdom–United States relations, with the British government briefing media against the American government.

The United States government, led by President Joe Biden, also faced significant domestic criticism. Former American presidents George W. Bush, Barack Obama, and Donald Trump, each of whom had overseen significant developments in the War in Afghanistan, also faced fresh criticism for their perceived missteps in the war. Opinion polls recorded a 7% drop in approval ratings for Biden's presidency in the week of the fall. Some Republicans, including Senator Josh Hawley, Congresswoman Marsha Blackburn, and former ambassador Nikki Haley, called on Biden to resign.

The 2021 Canadian federal election campaign began on the same day as the fall. The Canadian response to the crisis became a notable issue in the first few days of the campaign. On 18 August, Green Party of Canada leader Annamie Paul called for an emergency recall of Parliament to debate the crisis. NDP leader Jagmeet Singh argued that the government should have focused on addressing the crisis, as well as other simultaneously occurring crises such as the 2021 Haiti earthquake, instead of calling an election.

Concerns were raised in Australia that the Office of the Special Investigator, set up to gather evidence on possible Australian war crimes in Afghanistan after the Brereton Report, might face increased difficulties in gathering evidence, especially without Taliban cooperation.

Kazakhstan's president Kassym-Jomart Tokayev called on military mobilization, citing public concern amidst Taliban takeover although assuring that events in Afghanistan do not pose a "direct threat" but instead create "certain risks". He also announced that social benefits would be increased for military personnel as well as the salaries for the Internal Affairs employees.

In the Netherlands, both Minister of Foreign Affairs Sigrid Kaag and Minister of Defence Ank Bijleveld resigned from their positions after the Dutch Parliament passed a motion of censure against them for their handling of the evacuations.

== Responses to potential migrant crisis ==
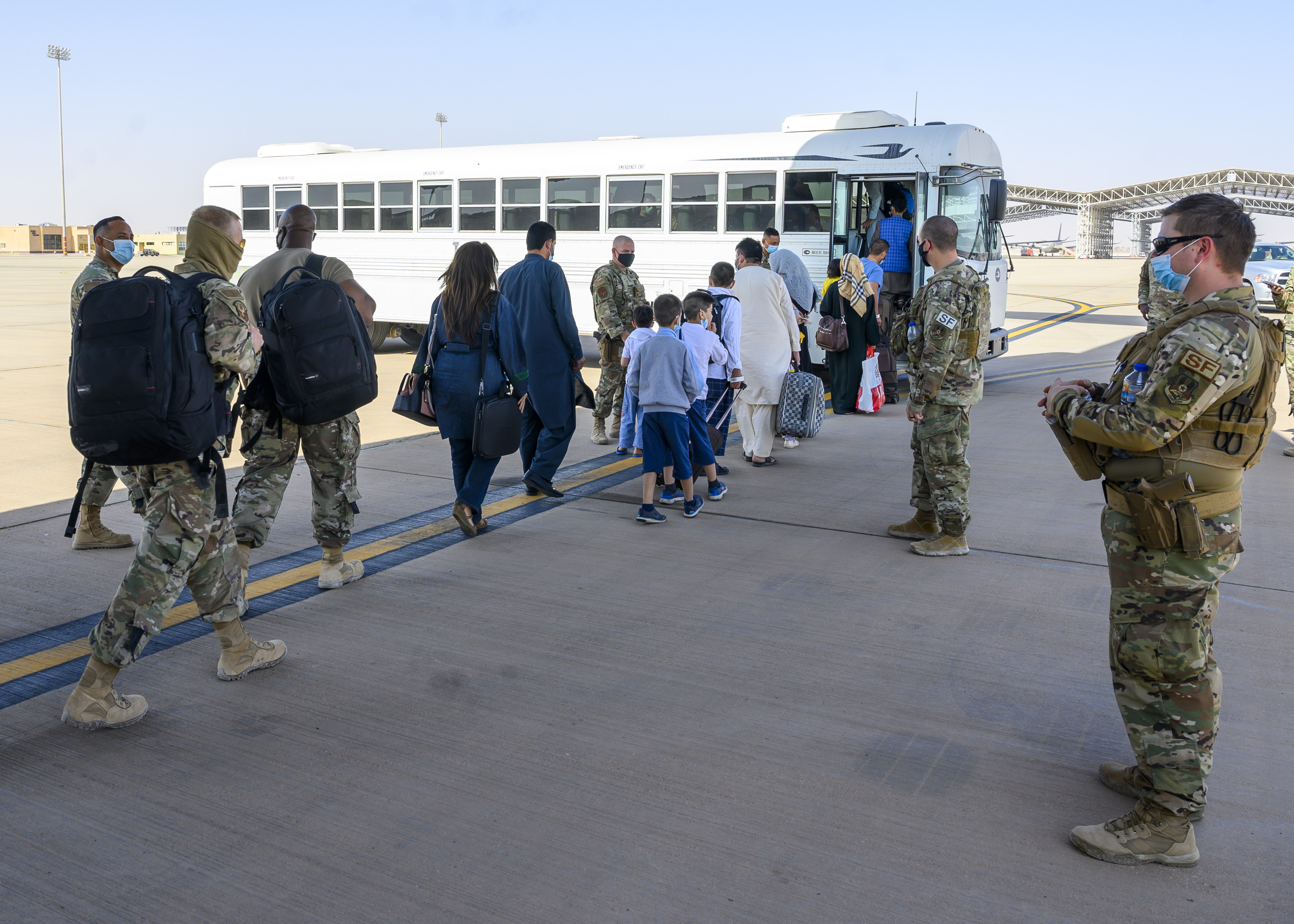
US airmen escorting evacuees at Prince Sultan Air Base in Saudi Arabia, 17 August 2021

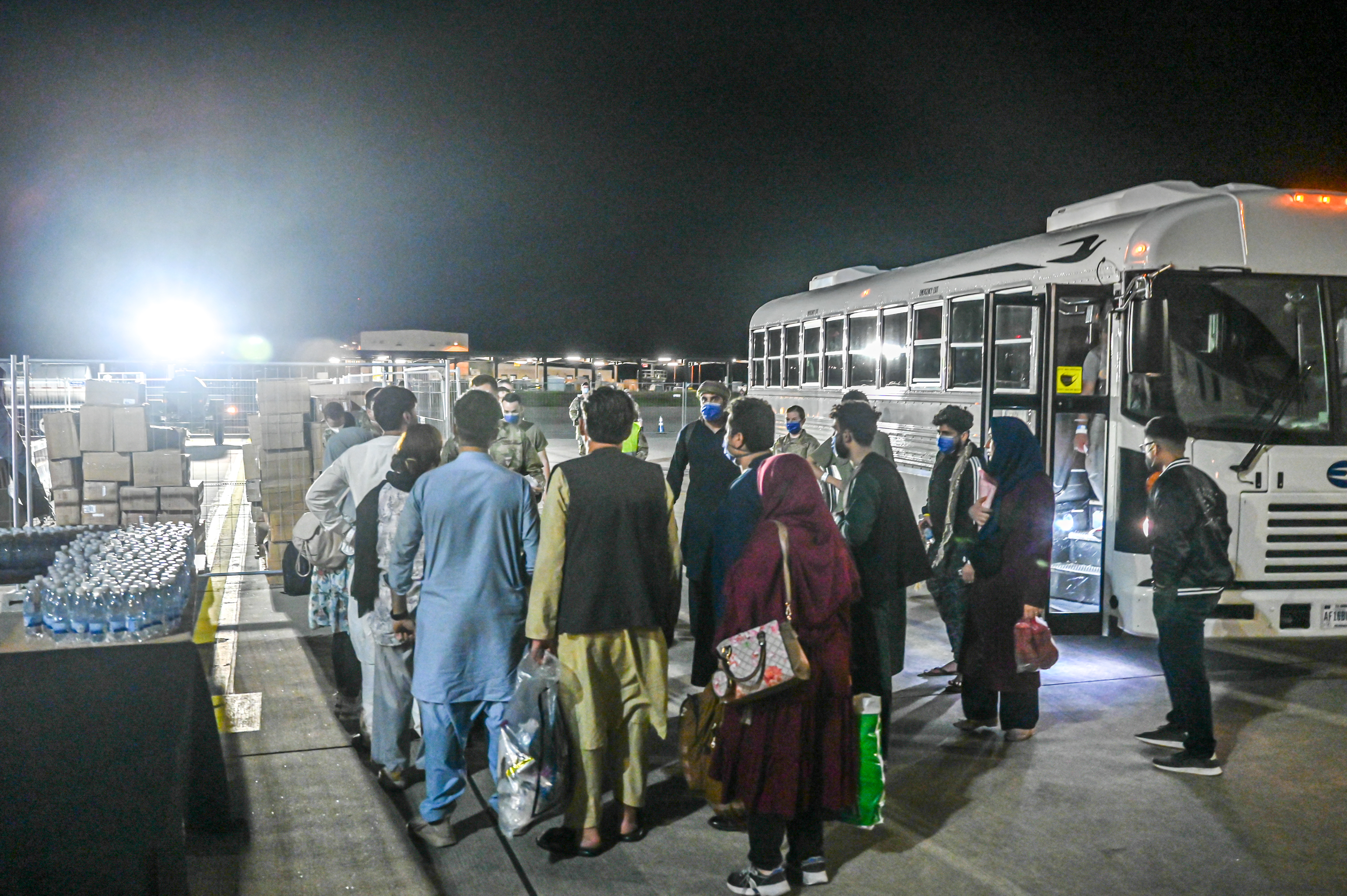
Evacuated Afghan nationals at Ramstein Air Base, 20 August

Various news sources including The New York Times, CBS News, the Financial Times and Reuters noted that European governments were less supportive of taking in refugees from Afghanistan than they had been of Syrian refugees in 2015. Florian Bieber of the University of Graz wrote on Politico that there has been "a shift since 2015 to the far right when it comes to issues of asylum and refugees" and that European politicians "have reduced the collapse of 20 years of international nation building and a devastating tragedy for women's rights and human rights down to just one question: how to get Afghan asylum seekers back to their country and keep new ones out."

Greece put its border forces on alert to block any migration and installed a 40 km-long wall on its border with Turkey. Turkish president Recep Tayyip Erdoğan declared that Turkey would not become "Europe's migrant storage unit". French president Emmanuel Macron stated that France needed to "anticipate and protect itself from a wave of migrants". The Australian government announced it would only be taking in 3000 refugees and that it would "not be offering a pathway to permanent residency or citizenship". UK Home Secretary Priti Patel argued that the UK "cannot accommodate 20,000 all in one go".

Macron and European Commissioner for Home Affairs Ylva Johansson additionally proposed cooperation with Afghanistan's neighbours so that refugees would stay there. The Eurasianet reported preparations that occurred in Kazakhstan, allegedly for Afghan arrivals, with desks being arranged in Shymkent school classrooms and college dorms for extra space to accommodate beds, although later were witnessed to be cleared away as the Kazakh government began denying any plans in accepting any migrants. On 20 August, the government of Uzbekistan deported 150 refugees to Afghanistan.

Despite anti-refugee sentiment expressed by politicians and governments, refugee charities in the UK saw a significant surge in donations following the fall of Kabul. On 20 August, over 1000 prominent French women signed an open letter arguing that "faced with the absolute danger of rape, submission and death, for a country that claims to be a country of enlightenment and democracy, there is no other choice but to offer asylum without conditions".

Representatives from a number of British media outlets released an open letter calling for the British government to offer asylum to Afghan journalists. French newspaper Le Monde published an editorial arguing that granting asylum to Afghans "isn't just a question of our humanity, it's our duty" and denouncing anti-refugee sentiment being stoked ahead of the 2022 French presidential election.

Afghan refugees trapped in Calais reported despair, being caught between refusal of European governments to accept them, including being subjected to police harassment, and potential torture and death at the hands of the Taliban. Refugees also reported being unable to get into contact with relatives back in Afghanistan after the Taliban takeover.

== Opinion polls ==
- An Associated Press poll conducted between 12 and 16 August found that 62% of Americans believed the War in Afghanistan was not worth fighting.
- A Morning Consult poll conducted between 16 and 19 August found that 53% of Americans approved of the decision to withdraw and that 43% believed that Biden held a great deal of responsibility for the fall.
- A CBS News poll conducted between 18 and 20 August found that 44% of American thought that the withdrawal from Afghanistan had gone very badly, that 53% disapproved of Biden's handling of the withdrawal, and 59% thought that the US was not doing enough to help Afghans escape the country.
- A YouGov Daily Question poll conducted on 19 August found that 33% of Brits thought Dominic Raab should resign as Foreign Secretary over his handling of the situation, while only 25% thought he should stay in the position.
- An Opinium/Observer poll conducted between 19 and 20 August found that 48% of Brits opposed the decision to withdraw American troops from Afghanistan, 43% supported a dedicated refugee programme for some Afghans (in the thousands) fleeing the Taliban. Furthermore, 51% still supported the original decision to invade Afghanistan in 2001.
- A Yougov poll found that Brits who support resettling Afghans would prefer for the numbers to be "in the thousands", and these views would fall in line with the current government's plan to settle a maximum of 5000 refugees per year for four years (total of 20000), with a focus on women and religious minorities.
