= Fox Sports (Australia) =

Australia group of sports channels

Fox Sports Australia
- Country: Australia
- Stations: Fox Sports News (500); Fox Cricket (501); Fox League (502); Fox Sports 503 (503); Fox Footy (504); Fox Sports 505 (505); Fox Sports 506 (506); Fox Sports 507 (507); Fox Sports UHD 1 (591); Fox Sports UHD 2 (592); Fox Sports UHD 3 (593); Fox Sports UHD 4 (594); Fox Sports UHD 5 (595)
- Headquarters: Gore Hill

Programming
- Language: English
- Picture format: 1080i (HDTV) 16:9; 4K (UHDTV) 16:9

Ownership
- Owner: DAZN; Fox Sports Pty Limited
- Parent: Foxtel

History
- Launched: 26 January 1995
- Former names: Premier Sports (prior to 19 February 1996)

Links
- Website: foxsports.com.au

Fox Sports Australia Pty Limited (formerly Premier Media Group Pty Limited) is the division of Foxtel that owns and operates the Fox Sports television networks and digital properties in Australia. The group operates nine Fox Sports Channels as well as Fox Sports News, Fox Cricket, Fox League, Fox Footy, Watch AFL and Watch NRL. Fox Sports channels such as Fox Netball are available via Foxtel or Kayo. The group's main competitors are beIN Sports, ESPN and Stan Sport. Unlike the American Fox Sports, the group is not owned directly by the Fox Corporation. However News Corp, which formerly held a 65% stake in Foxtel, was Fox Corporation's sister company until April 2025. Fox Sports Australia is now owned by DAZN. Fox Sports’ Australian channel brands will be renamed under the Kayo Sports banner in 2027 as owner DAZN brings its two major sports brands together.

== History ==
=== Launch ===
Fox Sports started life as the Premier Sports Network (later just Premier Sports) as the only fully operational local channel at the launch of Australia's first pay-television service, Galaxy. Premier Sports' backers included American company Prime International, which later became part of Liberty Media. The service was launched at 16:00 on 26 January 1995 in Sydney, and made a name for itself, securing the rights to Australia's cricket tour of the West Indies. Previously Australian cricket tours had been covered on the Nine Network on free-to-air, and Nine tried to stop the broadcast under Australia's anti-siphoning rules, which state that certain popular sporting events cannot be screened exclusively on pay television. PSN signed a deal with Network 10 to share the broadcast rights.

=== Foxtel launch ===
When Foxtel launched its cable service later that year, PSN was included as part of the package. Between 1995 and 2010, Fox Sports aired National Basketball League (NBL) games. On 1 March 1996, PSN was relaunched as Fox Sports Australia, to coincide with the new Super 12 rugby union competition and the proposed launch of the Super League.

In 1997 a secondary channel was launched on Foxtel to carry broadcasts of the new Super League competition. Fox Sports and its chief competitor, Sports Australia shared the rights to NRL broadcasts as a result of the legal settlement in the Super League war. The channel on Foxtel was later relaunched as Fox Sports Two, at first broadcasting from Friday through Monday each week, and later expanding to a full 24-hour, 7-day service in 2002.

=== Optus launch (2000s) ===
When Optus Vision dropped the C7 Sport service in March 2002, they started carrying the Fox Sports channels. These were referred to by Optus as "Optus Sports 1" and "Optus Sports 2" in Optus promotional material; on-air programming referred to the channels as simply "Sports One" and "Sports Two", although programming such as the nightly Fox Sports News bulletins retained the Fox name. Optus dropped the "Optus Sports" name in October 2002.

Fox Sports Two was generally used to cover bigger events that require large amounts of air time, such as the 1998 Winter Olympics, Grand Slam tennis tournaments, and the 2004 European Football Championship. It now specialises as a 24/7, dedicated Rugby league channel, Fox League.

During the 2006 Commonwealth Games in Melbourne, Fox Sports carried an additional eight channels dedicated to Games events. These were available to customers at an additional charge.

Fox Sports was the exclusive broadcaster of the A-League from its first season in 2005 until 2020. In 2006, an A$120 million deal between the Football Federation Australia and Fox Sports was reached after the end of the first season. Under the deal, Fox Sports had exclusive rights from 2007 to all Socceroos home internationals, all A-League and Asian Cup fixtures, World Cup qualifiers through the Asian Football Confederation, and all AFC Champions League matches until 2020.

The deal to cover the A-league live and exclusive reaped big rewards for Fox Sports, its ratings were very strong in the 2006–07 season and the 2007 A-league grand final became at the time, Fox Sports' highest ever rating event.

Ratings for football have generally been very good. The Socceroos first game of the 2007 AFC Asian Cup, attracted 345,000 viewers, while their quarter-final drew an average of 419,000 – at the time, an all-time record for Australian Pay TV. This record was broken on 1 April 2009, when the Socceroos defeated Uzbekistan to put them very close to qualification for the 2010 FIFA World Cup. This match was watched by an average of 431,000 people.

In 2007, Fox Sports reached a deal to broadcast 4 games live and exclusive from the AFL each week. This includes the exclusive only Sunday twilight match. In addition they will broadcast Friday night games live into New South Wales and Queensland via channel 518 at no extra charge – normally used for pay-per-view service Main Event. When channel 518 is used in this way it is promoted as Fox Sports Plus on-air.

The channel is being used increasingly to show live events when Fox Sports has a clash involving its main 3 channels. On Saturday 17 March 2007, for example, Fox Sports broadcast a match from the 2007 Cricket World Cup (Ireland v Pakistan) live on 518, as it was committed to football, rugby union and another cricket match on its main 3 channels.

=== 2010s ===
In 2010 Fox Sports coverage of National Rugby League games held 73 out of the top 100 programs of any type aired on Foxtel. In February 2012, the Premier Media Group changed its name to Fox Sports Pty Limited.

In February 2012, Premier Media Group changed its name to Fox Sports, with CEO Patrick Delany explaining "The change from Premier Media to Fox Sports provides a stronger reflection of the core business of the company in its name, which is, and will continue to be, sport".

On 2 November 2012, News Corp took control of Consolidated Media Holdings after a $2 billion merger was approved by the Australian Competition & Consumer Commission, Federal Court and Consolidated Media Holding shareholders, making News Corp 100% owner of Fox Sports Pty Ltd. In April 2018 News Corp Australia moved the ownership of the company to one of its subsidiaries Foxtel a joint venture with Telstra. On 5 March 2013, Fox Sports unveiled its new headquarters at Gore Hill in Sydney. It was announced that the main studio would be named the Clive Churchill Studio after rugby league immortal Clive Churchill, as the studio will house NRL coverage. Technical innovations were the main highlight, with CEO Patrick Delany unveiling the FoxKopter, the FoxMobile Segway, Ref Cam and Cornerpost Cam. Fox Sports also launched a new corporate logo in line with its global affiliate broadcasters.

On 3 September 2014, Fox Sports announced that SPEED and Fuel TV would be rebranded as Fox Sports 4 and Fox Sports 5 on 3 November 2014, of which both will be available in HD. In addition, it was announced that FOX Sports News would launch a HD feed on the same day, taking FOX Sports' suite to 7 channels, all available in HD.

On 23 February 2017, Fox Sports More+, a new channel for live, pop-up events was launched.

In November 2018, Foxtel announced a new over-the-top subscription streaming service known as Kayo Sports; the service was described as a "Netflix of sport" which would include live and on-demand access to Fox Sports programming, as well as ESPN Australia and beIN Sports.

=== 2020s ===
On 23 December 2024, international sports streaming company DAZN announced that it would acquire Foxtel from News Corp and Telstra in an agreement valued at $3.4 billion. It was stated that Foxtel would remain a standalone business under DAZN, and maintain its existing brands.

In September 2026, DAZN announced during its upfronts that it would rebrand the Fox Sports channels as Kayo Sports in 2027, unifying them with its streaming operations.

== Channels ==
- Fox Sports News: Channel 500. On 3 November 2014, Fox Sports News launched a HD simulcast. In addition, it moved from channel 513 to channel 500.
- Fox Cricket: Channel 501. Branded as Fox Sports 1 prior to 23 February 2017, then branded as Fox Sports 501 from 23 February 2017 to 17 September 2018.
- Fox League: Channel 502. Branded as Fox Sports 2 prior to 23 February 2017, then branded as Fox Sports 502 from 23 February 2017 to 27 February 2017.
- Fox Sports 503: Channel 503. Branded as Fox Sports 3 prior to 23 February 2017.
- Fox Footy: Channel 504.
- Fox Sports 505: Channel 505. Branded as Fox Sports 4 prior to 23 February 2017. Although Fox Netball broadcasts live on Fox Sports 505 as a pop-up channel.
- Fox Sports 506: Channel 506. Branded as Fox Sports 5 prior to 23 February 2017.
- Fox Sports More+/DAZN: Channel 507. Although broadcast 24/7, the channel only acts as a pop-up channel with only occasional programming.
- Fox Sports 508: Channel 508. On 21 February 2022, the Fox Sports Ultra HD channel 508 was removed to allow for an increased offering of Ultra HD Sports content from 11 March 2022 with the commencement of the NRL and AFL seasons.
- Fox Sports UHD 1: Channel 591.
- Fox Sports UHD 2: Channel 592.
- Fox Sports UHD 3: Channel 593.
- Fox Sports UHD 4: Channel 594.
- Fox Sports UHD 5: Channel 595.

=== Former channels ===
- Fox Sports 501: Channel 501. Also available in HD. Replaced by Fox Cricket.
- Fox Sports 502: Channel 502. Also available in HD. Replaced by Fox League.
- Fox Sports Plus: Launched on 6 September 2012, the channel showed what live and upcoming sports were available via Viewer's Choice on Fox Sports 1, 2, 3, 4, and 5. The channel ceased broadcasting on 9 February 2017, and was replaced on 23 February 2017 by Fox Sports More+.
- Fuel TV (replaced by Fox Sports 505)
- Main Event: The Main Event channel was used as an "overflow" channel when multiple live sporting events needed to be broadcast. This included Friday Night AFL in New South Wales, Queensland and Australian Capital Territory and Saturday Nights in New South Wales (excluding the Wagga Wagga market) and Canberra. It was also used nationwide for a Socceroos game in June 2007. On many occasions the Main Event channel was used when the Premier League had multiple games on the one night, although usage in this capacity is rare now that the "Viewer's Choice" system of showing multiple matches on one channel through multi-casting (pressing the "Red Button" on a Foxtel/Austar remote control). Unlike the AFL, the NRL was never broadcast into Southern Australia through Fox Sports Plus on Friday nights, leaving its Southern Australian fans having to wait until at least after midnight for a replay of the match on local free-to-air channels up until 2012.
- Speed (replaced by Fox Sports 506)
- Footy Play powered by Fox Sports (available on Xbox 360, Telstra T-Box, and Foxtel on Internet TV).
- Sports Play powered by Fox Sports (available on Xbox 360, Telstra T-Box, and Foxtel on Internet TV until 2013, when Fox Sports 1-3 launched on these services.)
- Fox Sports Ultra HD: Channel 508 in 4K Ultra HD. Channel ended on 10 March 2022 as Foxtel replaced it with "a brand-new Ultra HD sport destination" for when 4K events are broadcasting at the same time.

== Programming ==
=== Current programming ===
- Fight Call Out (2017–present)
- GolfBarons
- The Golf Show
- How Good Is Golf
- PGA Tour with Brett Ogle
- Pivot
- Monday Night with Matty Johns (2013–present)
- NRL 360 (2013–present)
- MotorRacing 360 (2026-present)
- UFC Fight Week

=== Former programming ===
- The Back Page (1997–2025)
- Bill & Boz (2017–2019)
- Inside Cricket
- E-League (Australia)
- Fox Fans League
- Fox Sports FC
- Inside Rugby
- Kick Off
- Shoot Out (2016–2021)
- The Crew (2013–2015)
- On the Couch with Sterlo (2013–2017)
- Santo, Sam and Ed's Total Football (2013–2015)

== Sports/competitions televised by Fox Sports ==
=== Current rights ===
==== Australian rules football ====
- Australian Football League Premiership Season (Broadcasts three matches live during most weekends of the regular season whenever sister channel Fox Footy, is screening another LIVE match at the same time. Fox Sports occasionally screens other programming such as magazine and panel shows that are produced and broadcast by Fox Footy.

==== Combat sports ====
- Cage Fighting Championship
- Evolution
- Fight Call Out (2017–present)
- Fox Sports Friday Night Fights
- Hammer Time
- Knees of Fury
- Legend MMA
- Maximus Academy
- UFC Fight Week
- The Ultimate Fighter

==== Cricket ====
- Australian national cricket team International Test Cricket (Shared with Seven Network)
- Australian national cricket team One-day Internationals
- Australian national cricket team Twenty20 Internationals
- Australian national cricket team International Women's Test Cricket (Simulcast of Seven Network coverage)
- Australian national cricket team Women's One-day Internationals (Simulcast of Seven Network coverage)
- Australian national cricket team Women's Twenty20 Internationals (Simulcast of Seven Network coverage)
- Australian domestic First-class Sheffield Shield final
- Australian domestic List A JLT One-Day Cup
- Australian domestic Twenty20 Big Bash League all 61 games (43 Shared with Seven Network)
- Australian domestic Women's Twenty20 Women's Big Bash League (Simulcast of Seven Network coverage)
- Home series of the England cricket team
- Home series of the West Indies cricket team
- Home series of the New Zealand cricket team
- Home series of the South African cricket team
- Home series of the Pakistan cricket team
- Home series of the Sri Lankan cricket team
- Home series of the Indian cricket team
- Global T20 Canada
- Caribbean Premier League
- Hong Kong T20 Blitz
- Super Smash
- Indian Premier League
- SA20
- T20 Blast
- Bangladesh Premier League
- Pakistan Super League
- International League T20

==== Darts ====
- PDC World Darts Championship
- PDC World Cup of Darts
- Premier League Darts

==== Field hockey ====
- Men's FIH Pro League
- Women's FIH Pro League
- Oceania Cup
- Hockey India League

==== Golf ====
- American PGA Tour (All rounds)
- European PGA Tour
- Champions Tour
- Women's major golf championships
- Asian Tour (highlights)
- US Open
- The Masters Tournament
- The Open Championship
- PGA Championship

==== Motorsport ====
Formula racing

- Formula One

Open wheel

- FIA Formula 2 Championship
- FIA Formula 3 Championship
- Indy Lights
- Toyota Racing Series

Stock Cars

- NASCAR Cup Series
- NASCAR Xfinity Series
- NASCAR Camping World Truck Series

Touring Cars

- Supercars Championship (shared with Seven Network)
- World Touring Car Cup
- British Touring Car Championship
- DTM
- Shannons Nationals Motor Racing Championships
- Summernats

Sportscars

- Australian GT Championship
- Bathurst 12 Hour (shared with Seven Network)
- Michelin Pilot Challenge
- Dubai 24 Hour
- FIA European Truck Racing Championship
- 24 Hours Nürburgring
- Shannons Nationals Motor Racing Championships
- FIA World Endurance Championship

Drag racing

- ANDRA Pro Series

Bikes

- MotoGP (shared with Network Ten)
- Superbike World Championship (shared with SBS)
- British Superbike Championship
- Australian Superbike Championship

Rally

- British Rally Championship
- European Rally Championship
- European Rallycross Championship

Speedway

- FIM Speedway Grand Prix
- FIM Speedway World Cup
- British Elite Speedway
- World Series Sprintcars
- Australian Sprintcar Championship
- Chequered Flag
- FIM Ice Speedway World Championship
- Grand Annual Sprintcar Classic
- World of Speedway

Motocross

- AMA Motocross Championship
- Australian Supercross Championship
- British Motocross Championship
- FIM Enduro World Championship
- FIM Motocross World Championship
- FIM MX of Nations
- FIM Supermoto
- MXTV

==== Netball ====
- Suncorp Super Netball
- INF Netball World Cup
- Constellation Cup
- Australian Diamonds

==== Rugby league ====
- National Rugby League (Every Game Live, 5 games Live and Exclusive and 3 game simulcast Live with Nine in a full round). Fox Sports occasionally screens other programming such as new magazine and panel shows that are produced and broadcast by Fox League.
- Holden Cup (2008–2017)
- New South Wales Cup
- Rugby Football League's Super League

==== Surfing ====
- World Surf League (All events live)

==== Ten-pin bowling ====
- Rollin' Thunder
- Weber Cup

=== Former Rights ===
==== Baseball ====
- Australian Baseball League (Championship series only)

==== Basketball ====
- FIBA World Cup
- EuroLeague
- National Basketball League (All games live on ESPN, including semi-finals and Grand Final) (Shared with 10 Peach)
- Women's National Basketball League (Shared with ABC)

==== Cricket ====
- Major League Cricket (Now on Amazon Prime Video)

==== Ice hockey ====
- Australian Ice Hockey League (Match of the round and highlights)

==== Motorsport ====
Rally

- World Rally Championship (shared with 10 Bold)
- Australian Rally Championship (shared with 10 Bold)

==== Netball ====
- ANZ Championship

==== Rugby union ====
- Super Rugby (All games live and exclusive) (1995–2020)
- Super W (All games live and exclusive) (2018–2020)
- The Rugby Championship (shared with Network Ten) (1995–2020)
- Wallabies internationals (shared with Network Ten) (1995–2020)
- Global Rapid Rugby (shared with SBS Sport)
- National Rugby Championship
- Currie Cup
- ITM Cup

==== Soccer ====
- Hyundai A-League (All games live, Saturday night matches shared with ABC TV and Friday night matches shared with SBS Sport) (2004–2021)
- Hyundai A-League Finals Series (All games live, shared with ABC TV) (2004–2021)
- Australia Cup (One live match per matchday, plus both semi-finals and the final live (2014–2019)
- Asian Champions League (All games involving Australian teams live, plus some others) (2021)
- AFC Asian Cup (All Games, 28 games (include the Socceroos team) exclusively live) (2021)
- Socceroos internationals (All games include AFC Asian cup and exclude FIFA World Cup finals games, shared with SBS Viceland (two matches only) and ABC TV for the World Cup qualification second round) (2021)
- Indian Super League (2021)
- Other separate International Football matches
- Westfield W-League (One live match per week, plus both semi-finals and the grand final live; shared with ABC TV) (2015–2021)

==== Tennis ====
- World Tennis Challenge
- Moorilla Hobart International
- ATP 250 Series; Open Sud de France, Quito Open, Memphis Open, Geneva Open)
- WTA Tour (replays)
- Hawaii Open

==== WWE ====
- RAW (replay)
- Smackdown (replay)
- NXT (replay)

== Availability ==
Fox Sports is available nationally and is available on Foxtel's My Sport package and Optus featuring Foxtel's Total Sport package.

== Logos ==
2008–2013

2013–2015

2015–present

== See also ==
- List of sports television channels
