= This Afternoon (TV program) =

- Genre: News and Current Affairs
- Presented by: Andrew Daddo; Katrina Blowers; Mark Ferguson
- Country of origin: Australia
- Original language: English
- No. of seasons: 1
- No. of episodes: 12

Production
- Executive producer: Kerri Elstub
- Producer: Cathy Murray
- Running time: 60 minutes (including commercials)

Original release
- Network: Nine Network
- Release: 29 June – 14 July 2009

Related
- Nine Afternoon News; Nine Afternoon News (second run)

This Afternoon (stylised as THIS afternoon) is a short-lived Australian news and current affairs television program that was broadcast by the Nine Network. It was produced by the network and broadcast live from 4:30pm to 5:30pm weekdays for two-and-half weeks in mid-2009.

The program focused on news, sport, weather and entertainment and featured current affairs reports and interviews. The program was presented by Andrew Daddo, radio presenter and journalist Katrina Blowers and news presenter Mark Ferguson. Nine News reporters from around the country and overseas provided reports on news and entertainment.

On 15 July 2009, the Nine Network cancelled This Afternoon after 12 airings due to poor ratings. With the demise of This Afternoon, Nine reinstated Nine Afternoon News (which had been replaced by This Afternoon), followed by Antiques Roadshow at 5.00pm and Hot Seat at 5.30pm. As a result, Nine News had Mark Ferguson as national presenter until left the Nine Network on 25 September 2009 to join the Seven Network.

== See also ==
- List of programs broadcast by Nine Network
- List of Australian television series
