= Simon Turnbull =

Australian astrologer (1950–2014)

- Turnbull at Watsons Bay, Sydney in 2010
- Born: Simon Scott Turnbull; 10 May 1950; Sydney, Australia
- Died: 6 November 2014 (aged 64); Sydney, Australia
- Occupations: Psychic; Singer; Songwriter; Writer; Musician; Parapsychologist; Co-founder of the International Psychics Association
- Years active: 1970–2014
- Spouse: Hiromi Mitsuya (m. 1999)
- Website: internationalpsychicsassociation.com

Simon Scott Turnbull (10 May 1950 – 6 November 2014) was an entrepreneur in the Australian psychic industry, a self-proclaimed psychic and writer on parapsychology who had been researching telepathy and precognition and other so-called paranormal areas of expertise for over forty years. Since 1975 he had appeared on many television programs discussing psychic matters and debating with skeptics about the perceived value of following ones intuition. He was the President of the Australian Psychics Association (APA), an authority on tarot, and a practicing astrologer. He was the co-founder of the International Psychics Association.

== Psychic beginnings ==
In 1970 Turnbull began delving into psychic research by visiting a professional psychic, Brian Zodemsky, a former Catholic priest, for a psychic reading. Zodemsky told him he was involved with two women who shared the same name. This was true; he was going out with two women called Rhonda (one of whom he subsequently married). Turnbull immediately stopped the reading and asked Zodemsky how he did that. Zodemsky promptly began to teach his method of reading the tarot. After going to a local spiritualist church to learn mediumship, he found himself looking for spirits in ex-Prime Minister Paul Keating's newly acquired house. Turnbull soon began giving psychic readings on a part-time basis whilst still maintaining his musical career.

Turnbull made his first television appearance as a psychic in 1975 on Australia’s ‘The Mike Walsh Show', which was telecast live nationally. Mike Walsh asked him to demonstrate psychometry, which is the supposed ability to read the life of the owner of an object held by the psychic. Turnbull received the name 'Hilda'. The owner of the watch then told the audience that Hilda was her sister, and she was sitting right next to her in the audience. They had both been arguing as to who would give their watch to host Mike Walsh before the show. In 1975 Turnbull also met Israeli psychic Uri Geller for the first time, who was then touring Australia, and Turnbull would later edit a book with him. Spoonbending is a form of psychokinesis – the ability to influence an object with the mind.

== Australian Psychics Association ==
In 1983, Turnbull and fellow psychic Garry Wiseman founded the Australian Psychics Association (APA). Early members were psychics who wrote on the subject for newspapers and magazines and/or provided psychic information for radio and television programs. Psychic artist Esther Crowley drew a picture in pastels of Turnbull's spirit guide, the late Billy Hill. She depicted Billy Hill as a bald man. Turnbull recognised him immediately, as before death he had suffered from cancer and lost his hair because of chemotherapy. People who went to see psychics were very much subjective about the experience. People tend to want to confirm their own intuition about the difference between what they feel and what they think they feel. TurnbullI recommends that anyone who goes for a reading should always ask for a recording of the session. Firstly so they remember everything – most people only remember the good and forget the bad. Secondly so they can diarise the reading and see how accurate it turned out to be. Deja vu is an area psychics were often asked to explain. Turnbull has worked with media organisations to help disclose the whereabouts of fake psychics whenever possible. The association supports psychics from all over the world.

In Kylie Entirely, a documentary which aired in 2002 on the UK's Channel 4, Turnbull was asked to give a reading for Kylie Minogue due to accurate readings given about her by him fifteen years earlier. In 2006 Fox Studios Australia asked Turnbull to be a consultant on a brand new psychic TV series called The One, The Search for Australia's Most Gifted Psychic', televised in Australia in 2008 on the Seven Network. A second season was made in 2011 and Turnbull was once again contracted to find psychics for the show.

== Awards and honours ==
- 2004 Awarded the Australian Psychic of the Year (National) award.
- 2004 Awarded the Australian Psychic Hall of Fame award.
- 2008 Awarded the Australian Psychic of the Year (NSW) award.
- 2013 Awarded the Australian Psychic Ambassador award.

== Predictive remote viewing ==
Turnbull and psychic researcher Charles Scarf began a three-month research exercise in 2003 using a form of remote viewing they called predictive remote viewing (PRV). The idea behind this research was to evaluate the worth of using PRV to predict the stock market. Two photos were selected at random from a database of 3000 photos and put into an envelope marked 'A' and 'B' by an assistant. 'A' represented the stock as going up the following day; 'B' indicated the stock would go down. These were kept by an 'analyst' (Scarf et al.), who would check and compare the drawings and descriptive text sent by the 'viewer' (Turnbull) by email.

The test protocol ensured that these would be 'double blind' experiments, where neither the viewer nor the analyst had any idea what the envelopes contained. If the raw data provided psychically by Turnbull was similar to photograph 'A', then the prediction would be for the stock chosen to go up. If the raw data was closest to the photograph marked 'B', then the stock would be indicated to go down. If no similarity occurred with either photo, then there would be no selection made, and it was decided to 'pass' on that particular stock. An annual set of predictions regarding stocks has appeared in the Australian newspaper each January for the past several years. For the third year running, writes business editor Tim Boreham in The Australian, Turnbull was the closest of the six finance experts in tipping the All Ordinaries index 2005 closing level at 4570 points, compared with its actual close of 4708.8. In 2009 Turnbull was closest to predicting the strength of the Australian dollar. . Midway through 2012 finds Turnbull's defensive stock market predictions being justified.

== International Remote Viewing Association ==
An invitation for Turnbull to speak in Las Vegas in 2004 at the 3rd International Remote Viewing Association (IRVA) conference resulted in his presenting his paper 'The Future of Remote Viewing'. Remote viewing has a lot of value for psychics who would like to upgrade their abilities and train themselves to improve their clairvoyance.

== Psychic publishing ==
Since 2005 Turnbull had edited the annual Australian Psychics Directory together with co-publishers Hiromi Mitsuya and Leela J. Williams. Each year the Australian Psychic of the Year Awards are announced in the directory. The psychic industry all around the world has become of greater interest to some people, due to the uncertainty of the economic crisis of the past few years. People have felt compelled to re-evaluate their spirituality, and using psychics has been just one of the many alternatives available to them. When seeing a psychic Turnbull suggested that one should have a list of specific questions ready to ask, without giving too much information to the psychic. Australian Psychics Directory articles regarding predictions have appeared in other Australian national magazines.
