= Fox Fans League =

- Event: 2015 Fox Fans League
J. Mangraviti Sydney FC	S. Mort (W) Western Sydney Wanderers
4	0
- 0 – 0 at half time
- Date: AEST, 29 March 2015
- Venue: Federation Square, Melbourne

The Fox Fans League was launched in 2015 to find the best player of FIFA 15 on PlayStation 4 in Australia.

== 2015 National Finals ==
=== Round of 16 Results ===
#	First Player			Second Player		
Match	Goal(s)	Player	Club	Goal(s)	Player	Club
1	0	S.Pendlebury (W) (Note: Wildcard Player. AFL Footballer for Collingwood Magpies.)	Melbourne City	1	G.Ablett (W) (Note: Wildcard Player. AFL Footballer for Gold Coast Suns.)	Melbourne City
2	1	J.Soward (W) (Note: Wildcard Player. NRL Footballer for Penrith Panthers.)	Western Sydney Wanderers	0	K. Barbarouses (W) (Note: Wildcard Player. A-League Footballer for Melbourne Victory.)	Melbourne Victory
3	7	J. Mangraviti	Sydney FC	1	D. Clayton (W) (Note: Wildcard Player. Channel V presenter.)	Sydney FC
4	4	P. Sasianis (W) (Note: Wildcard Player. NPL Victoria Footballer for South Melbourne FC & Winner of the NPL Players Wildcard.)	?	5	J. Andruszkiewicz	Adelaide United
5	2	N. Ackermann	?	1	S. Ravoul	?
6	0	G. Munro	?	1	J. Nadilo	Central Coast Mariners
7	1	S. Naicker	?	2	M.Gunn	Western Sydney Wanderers
8	0	V. Katsaitis	Melbourne City	1	S. Mort (W) (Note: Wildcard Player. FIFA 15 YouTube personality.)	Western Sydney Wanderers

=== Quarter-final Results ===
#	First Player			Second Player		
Match	Goal(s)	Player	Club	Goal(s)	Player	Club
9	1	G.Ablett (W) (Note: Wildcard Player. AFL Footballer for Gold Coast Suns.)	Melbourne City	3	J.Soward (W) (Note: Wildcard Player. NRL Footballer for Penrith Panthers.)	Western Sydney Wanderers
10	1*	J. Mangraviti	Sydney FC	1	J. Andruszkiewicz	Adelaide United
11	1	N. Ackermann	?	3	J. Nadilo	Central Coast Mariners
12	0	M.Gunn	Western Sydney Wanderers	4	S. Mort (W) (Note: Wildcard Player. FIFA 15 YouTube personality.)	Western Sydney Wanderers

=== Semi-final Results ===
#	First Player			Second Player		
Match	Goal(s)	Player	Club	Goal(s)	Player	Club
13	0	J.Soward (W) (Note: Wildcard Player. NRL Footballer for Penrith Panthers.)	Western Sydney Wanderers	5	J. Mangraviti	Sydney FC
14	0	J. Nadilo	Central Coast Mariners	2	S. Mort (W) (Note: Wildcard Player. FIFA 15 YouTube personality.)	Western Sydney Wanderers

=== Grand-Final result ===
#	First Player			Second Player		
Match	Goal(s)	Player	Club	Goal(s)	Player	Club
15	4	J. Mangraviti	Sydney FC	0	S. Mort (W) (Note: Wildcard Player. FIFA 15 YouTube personality.)	Western Sydney Wanderers

It's unclear who any of the remaining 5 players represented. The only remaining clubs from the A-League not known to be represented above are Brisbane Roar, Newcastle Jets, Perth Glory, & Wellington Phoenix
