= The Golf Show =

- Genre: Sport/News
- Starring: Andrew Daddo
- Country of origin: Australia
- Original language: English

Production
- Camera setup: Multiple-camera setup
- Running time: 30 minutes (including commercials)

Original release
- Network: Fox Sports
- Release: 1997

The Golf Show, currently branded as The New Golf Show, is an Australian golf television series broadcast on Fox Sports on Tuesday nights.

The show was launched in 1997 with Brett Ogle the longest-serving host from 2002 to 2016. In 2016, the show was briefly replaced by different golf programming on Fox Sports. In October 2016, the show relaunched as The New Golf Show featuring Andrew Daddo as host and Paul Gow and Louise Ransome as presenters.

== See also ==
- List of longest-running Australian television series
