= Oliver Phommavanh =

Author and teacher

- Born: 1983 (age 42–43); Sydney, New South Wales, Australia
- Education: University of Sydney; Western Sydney University
- Occupation: Author
- Writing career
- Period: 2010–2024
- Genre: Children's literature
- Notable work: Thai-riffic!

Oliver Phommavanh (born 1983) is an Australian children's book author and former primary school teacher. Phommavanh was charged for the online grooming of a 13-year-old girl on 18 May 2024 and on 13 February 2026 was sentenced to six-and-a-half years.

== Early life and education ==
Phommavanh was born to a Thai mother and a Laotian father who migrated to Australia in 1977. Phommavanh grew up in Western Sydney and attended Western Sydney University, where he earned his writing degree as well as the University of Sydney where he earned his teaching degree. In 2007, he stopped teaching in order to pursue his writing and stand-up comedy careers. A SBS News profile in 2012 referred to him as the "Asian Paul Jennings".

== Personal life ==
Before his arrest Phommavanh had been an ambassador for the NSW Premier's Reading Challenge as well as a supporter of the Australian branch of Room to Read.

=== Child grooming conviction ===
On 18 May 2024, Phommavanh was arrested for sending inappropriate photos and videos to a minor, after he sent a nude photo to an under cover police officer he believed to be a young girl. In court it was revealed that, from 2018 to 2022, Phommavanh had been talking to three girls aged from 11 to 13, as well as the undercover police officer. Two of the three girls had sent him messages online after he had spoken at their schools. He had spoken to one of the girls for five years, until she was 16 and reported him to the police. On 13 February 2026, Phommavanh was sentenced for the online grooming of the three girls and is serving a six-and-a-half year sentence, with a four-year non-parole period.

== Works ==
- 2010: Thai-riffic!
- 2011: Con-Nerd
- 2012: Things a Map Won't Show You: Stories from Australia and Beyond
- 2012: Punchlines
- 2012: Thai-no-mite!
- 2016: The Other Christy
- 2018: Natural Born Loser
- 2019: Don't Follow Vee
- 2019: Super Con-Nerd
- 2021: Brain Freeze
- 2022: What about Thao?
