= Sam Mort =

Unicef chief of communications Afghanistan

- Born: Samantha Melise Tuduetso Mort
- Education: B.A. in English, History and Education University of Stirling
- Occupations: Chief of Communication and Advocacy (South Asia)
- Employer: Unicef
- Known for: working in Afghanistan during the Taliban offensive

Sam Mort (born Samantha Melise Tuduetso Mort) is Chief of Communication and Advocacy for UNICEF South Asia in Nepal.

She was previously Chief of Communication, Advocacy and Civic Engagement for UNICEF in Afghanistan from 2019. In 2019, she announced that Unicef had made a historic deal to have girls educated in the Taliban-controlled areas of the country. She was with UNICEF in Kabul during the 2021 Taliban offensive, when the insurgents took over from the elected government. She stayed on in the country until 2023.

== Career ==
Born in Botswana to Scottish parents. Mort grew up in the Highlands of Scotland and attended Kingussie High School, and she graduated BA in English, Education and History and Dip.Ed. at University of Stirling in 1994.

Upon graduating, she taught senior school students in Australia and Scotland, at George Heriot's School, Edinburgh from 1996 - 2001; firstly teaching English, then as assistant principal teacher for English and Drama. In 2001, she took up a 2-year role with Voluntary Service Overseas, in Agordat, Eritrea training Primary School English teachers and redesigning the English curriculum.

From 2003 through 2011, Mort served in the Office of Her Majesty Queen Rania Al-Abdullah in Jordan's Royal Hashemite Court as Senior Communications Manager. She was acknowledged for supporting the contribution of the Jordan royal house to the study of Arab Philanthropy by the John D. Gerhart Center for Philanthropy and Engagement at the American University in Cairo.

She then joined UNICEF's Headquarters in New York, as Senior Speechwriter to Executive Director Anthony Lake, a role she held for 5 years. She had a brief mission at UNICEF's Office for Relations with EU Institutions in Brussels. She then worked alongside Dr. Pia Britto, running UNICEF's first global and integrated campaign on early childhood development, Early Moments Matter, between 2016 and 2020, and in Burundi. Another 6-month mission with UNICEF Viet Nam followed.

== Role in Unicef Afghanistan ==
In September 2020, Mort took up her current role as Chief of Communication, Advocacy and Civic Engagement in UNICEF's Office in Afghanistan. Furthermore, during the female ban, Mort had difficulty agreeing to the one UN approach and actively worked against its implementation.

=== COVAX project ===
Mort was involved in the first COVAX project in Afghanistan (a multi-agency WHO led procurement and supply, with logistics via Unicef) with delivery of almost 0.5million COVID-19 AstraZeneca vaccines, which arrived in Kabul in March 2021.

=== Afghanistan crisis ===
During the US withdrawal of troops from Afghanistan and subsequent Taliban takeover in 2021, Mort reportedly had communications with the Taliban leaders on behalf of the UNICEF groups working across Afghanistan, announcing that they had been asked to 'pause but remain'. Shortly before this, Mort was quoted saying that ‘Afghanistan has long been one of the worst places on Earth to be a child but…. in the last 72hours, that's got a lot worse,‘ and in a radio interview, stated that in that year, 550 children had been killed and 1,400 children had been injured.

Mort drew media attention to just one example of the 180,000 children fleeing from their homes during the regime change: a young boy (Rafi) whose legs were burned when shrapnel set fire to the blanket he slept in. He is now believed to be in a refugee camp near Kandahar.

Mort reported 0.5million displaced people internally due to the conflict, about 50% of which are children, and drought and harvest failure is likely, leading to child malnutrition. On 22 August 2021, Mort released a press statement from WHO and UNICEF re the lack of use of incoming flight capacity for emergency medicines to the population.

=== UN and Taliban education agreement ===
At the end of 2020, Mort was reporting a formal agreement for between the Taliban and Unicef to bring in community-based education for 100,000 -140,000 children including girls. The negotiations began from considering UN-led polio vaccination and other services the non-political Unicef offered in Afghanistan, initially in Taliban-led provinces of the country and the schooling programme developed from there. Overall at that time it was estimated that 3.7 to 4million children in the country were not schooled.

Mort said on (16 -19 August 2021) Unicef were cautiously hopeful this deal would continue and the Taliban press conference would be confirmed that women can work and girls be schooled, although there is significant fear in the community, which she recognises, that women's rights and girl's education are going to be threatened.

=== Continuing aid work ===
Mort has made an international appeal to support the work of Unicef in the country, which she expects will continue, as the humanitarian organisation is used to dealing with 'parties to conflict' and there are 'no enemy children' in Unicef's view. She emphasises the risk to 1 million children of malnourishment is rising with the drought and so many families fleeing conflict (later she revised that to 10 million). Although the organisation is in daily contact with the Taliban leadership, on day 4 of new regime Mort said they are 'waiting to see what happens next'. Along with Marianne O'Grady of Care International, Mort is remaining in position, as O'Grady said 'now is a time for the humanitarian sector to be here and to serve'. Mort had said it will be a 'new experience' in the next few days, as she is going out into the field to visit some of the programmes that UNICEF are supporting, with dialogue in progress on Taliban agreeing to provide the security cover.

UNICEF is calling on global partners to establish with the country an 'air bridge' for urgent medical and aid supplies to come into the country again. Although the Unicef compound itself felt explosions in Kabul, and the 'horrific' terrorist bombs at the airport were 'about 8-10 kilometres away', Mort and her team said their office is 'well guarded' and they were able to visit a hospital and displaced persons camp to assess whether mothers were still taking babies for vaccination, and for treatment for malnutrition. Although the wards were 'quite full' and 'around 170 women doctors, health workers, cleaners and administration staff' were still working despite increased anxiety, 'according to the female secretary for the hospital director' (as at 20 August 2021), Mort was said to note an atmosphere of 'sisterhood and camaraderie'. The Unicef aid team of 300 staff in various locations in the country are in a 'wait and see mode' and their safety risks being assessed daily. She commented on the uncertainty of leadership strategy and factions within the Taliban, and how well they will stand up to the agreement on maintaining safety and security of aid workers. Mort commended her colleagues for preparing for the US withdrawal by dispersing supplies in advance, but called on the country's new leaders to keep the borders and air bridge open for incoming aid supplies. She asked that the international community support women and children there 'who are the least responsible and paying the highest price'. Half of Afghanistan, and 10 million children are in need of humanitarian assistance, said Mort. Her mother in Kirriemuir, Scotland is being supported by 'the village' in her concern for Mort's own safety.

=== Visit by UN High Commissioner and ongoing situation ===
Filipo Grandi, UN High Commissioner visited Kabul on 13 September 2021, to assess the situation of 3.5million displaced Afghans, and as UN hosted a meeting of country and non-governmental organisations who pledged aid support, some expressed scepticism of the Taliban's approach to women's rights. Mort was interviewed on 17 September 2021 about her motivation for staying in Kabul, life within the UN compound and the situation in the country. She told her interviewer 'stories of loss, reunification and reaching to the stars for hope, and said “I see a bravery in Afghanistan's girls and women that I haven't seen anywhere else, because the fears and the threats are real and they acknowledge it. And they move forward."'

=== Accountability to donors and on a precipice of a 'humanitarian catastrophe' ===
Mort was reported two months later, as saying that donations to Unicef Afghanistan, since the regime takeover, are accountable through internal audits so ' not a single penny goes through the Taliban' although the regime accepts her charitable organisation is supporting local NGOs and will help those most in need.

She said that the situation is 'on a precipice' with children's malnutrition in the country, likely to cause the 'death of 1.1million under 5 year-olds' within the next few weeks, 'without urgent treatment' but 'the global community had stopped funding'. This reflected a report, including a near 'break down' by BBC journalist John Simpson, in describing the 'hunger crisis' in which the World Food Programme estimated some 23million people are "marching towards starvation".

Mort had visited the largest children's hospital, named after Indira Gandhi, and found 'only 2 nurses for 60 children in one ward', and overall it had lost a quarter of its nurses (some could no longer afford the journey to work) and until recently, the hospital could not pay staff without finance from the health ministry, which in turn had previously come from overseas donors. She said she had found that the doctor was 'cutting down dead trees' for heating the premises as winter approached, and had no paper for prescriptions, nor an adequate food stock for sick children, parents or staff. Mort had also visited clinics where there was a reported '30 to 50% increase in malnutrition in a month'. She was shocked at the sight of a four-year-old girl (who had fortunately come in for treatment), 'Parawana....who was found to weigh only around 9.10 kg' (half the expected weight) and ' didn't have the strength or will to raise her head, she had no curiosity'. Mort describes the girl's arm as thin as a 'broom handle' and her skin was so 'paper thin, she looked like an old woman' with gaunt cheeks and hair loss, and she said 'there are millions more like her.'

Mort said Unicef were scaling up drastically, giving cash sometimes as the fastest way to help in the urgent situation and with rapid food price inflation, but she was 'urging the global community to fund [Unicef] directly so [they] can help those most in need.'

Mort and the Unicef team remain in post, when other overseas staff had left, hoping to give 'some hope to Afghans' and to make a 'practical difference'.

In the first quarter of 2022, Mort reported that basic foodstuffs had become even more unaffordable, women and girls are expected by the Taliban regime to stay at home and thus child labour was increasing and very young children become open to abuse or exploitation, and she said that 'small children, inadequately dressed for winter, pounding on car windows and running through traffic to sell chewing gum, shoelaces and toys' show 'how desperate the situation is,' with 13 million children now considered in need of humanitarian aid, and up to 80% of the population having to drink contaminated water. Mort commented in March 2022 on the specific situation of older girls at last returning to school, a policy suddenly overturned by the 'de facto regime' once again, which she explained (in answer to press questions), had not been communicated to Unicef or other partners, who were preparing with the ministry of education there to celebrate the opportunity for adolescent girls to return to public schools; the impact of this was noted in the international news.
