= Bankstown Bunker =

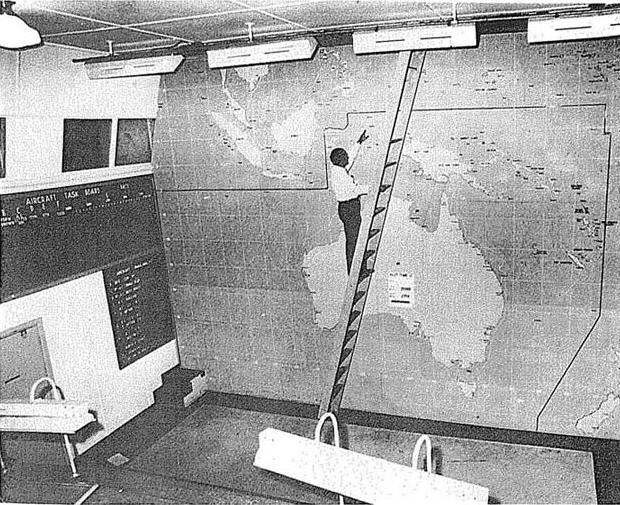
- Bankstown bunker in 1945

- Location within Sydney
- 33°55′01″S 151°00′54″E
- Location: Condell Park, New South Wales, Australia

History
- Built: 1943–1944
- Built for: Royal Australian Air Force

Site notes
- Architect: Allied Works Council

New South Wales Heritage Register
- Official name: Air Defence Headquarters Ruin Sydney (former); ADHQ Sydney; No. 1 Fighter Section Headquarters; 1FSHQ; Bankstown Bunker; RAAF No. 1 Installation Bankstown; No. 101 Fighter Sector
- Type: State heritage (complex / group)
- Designated: 18 November 2011
- Reference no.: 1857
- Type: Defence Base Air Force
- Category: Defence
- Builders: Stuart Bros

The Bankstown Bunker, formerly known as Air Defence Headquarters Sydney (ADHQ Sydney), is a heritage-listed defunct Royal Australian Air Force (RAAF) operations facility, located on the corner of Marion and Edgar Street, in Condell Park, New South Wales, Australia. It was designed by the Allied Works Council and built from 1943 to 1944 by Stuart Bros Pty Ltd of Sydney. It is also known as Air Defence Headquarters Ruin Sydney (former), No. 1 Fighter Section Headquarters, 1FSHQ, Bankstown Bunker and RAAF No. 1 Installation Bankstown; No. 101 Fighter Sector. It was added to the New South Wales State Heritage Register on 18 November 2011.

After the arrival of General Douglas MacArthur in Australia during World War II, Bankstown Airport was established as a key strategic air force base to support the war effort. During this period the specially constructed bunker became an important RAAF headquarters from 1945 until its closure in 1947. The Bankstown bunker is currently buried under a public park which lies at the end of Taylor Street, and is not accessible by the general public.

== History ==
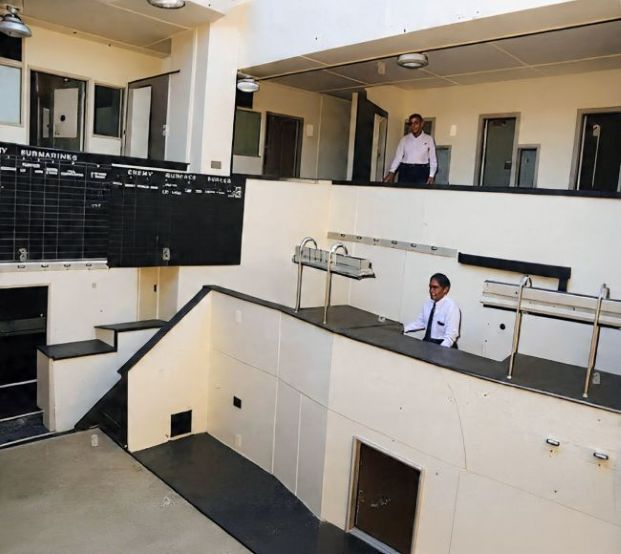
The Bankstown Bunker during World War II

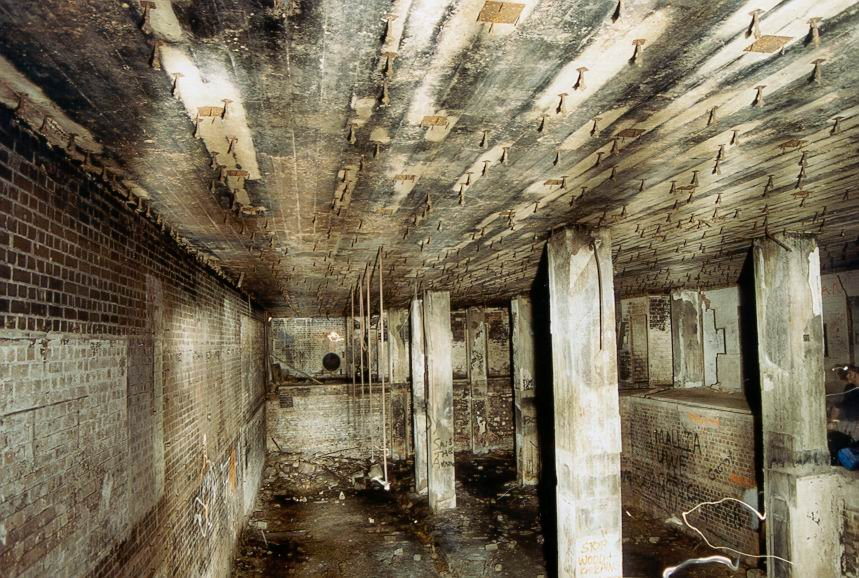
The same room as it is today, after a fire destroyed it in 1972

From 1945 to 1947 the Bankstown bunker was used as a covert Royal Australian Air Force (RAAF) base. Construction of the facility commenced in late 1942 at a cost of A£30,579 with its official commissioning in January 1945 as the headquarters for No. 1 Fighter Sector RAAF. This unit had previously operated from the Capital Hall picture theatre in Bankstown and a tunnel under the St James railway station.

The bunker was manned at all times in shifts that the Air Force called "Flights". Most of the personnel that worked in the bunker were local. Even so, the Air Force provided accommodation for them in Chapel Road, Bankstown whilst buses with blacked-out windows transported military personnel to the bunker. All staff for the bunker had to undergo special training, including 'plane identification' training that also took place at Chapel Road.

The bunker was manned by members of the No.2 Volunteer Air Observer Corps, the Women's Auxiliary Australian Air Force, members of the Royal Australian Air Force and the United States Army Air Forces.

A transmitting station for the bunker was located in Johnston Road, Bass Hill and was a building of above ground construction.

The bunker appears to have been decommissioned when the ADHQ was disbanded in 1947. A caretaker was then assigned to the take care of the bunker.

It wasn't until 1971 that members of No. 2 Stores Depot RAAF in Regents Park invited the then editor of the Bankstown Torch, Phil Engisch into the bunker. Many photos were taken and an article was placed in local newspapers detailing the find. In 1972, arsonists set the bunker on fire. In 1976 the NSW Department of Housing acquired the land the bunker is built under and redeveloped the area into the townhouses that now cover most of the site. The area now comprises a number of separate complexes or "Closes" containing eight to eleven villas. Each Close is named appropriately after a type of aeroplane that flew from Bankstown during World War II.

=== No. 1 Fighter Sector Headquarters Unit ===
With the fall of Rabaul and Singapore to the Japanese Army in January and February 1942 and the bombing of Darwin on 19 February 1942, the Australian government and many Australians became fearful that Japan would invade the Australian mainland. As part of the Federal Government's response to this threat, the RAAF was greatly expanded and the RAAF for the first time was given the role of air defence of Australia's strategic areas. Fighter Sector Headquarters were established in Sydney, New Lambton, Melbourne, Brisbane, Townsville, Darwin, Perth and Port Moresby. In addition, Mobile Fighter Sector Headquarters were formed at Darwin, Perth, Townsville and Camden (NSW).

The main responsibilities of the Fighter Sector Headquarters were to:

- receive aircraft sightings from radar posts (known as Radio Direction Finding Posts), Navy ships, Volunteer Air Observer Corps lookout posts and other sources;
- Determine whether aircraft were friendly or hostile and if hostile direct fighter squadrons and/or Navy ships and Army anti-aircraft artillery units to shoot down the aircraft;
- issue air raid warnings to RAAF, Army and Navy headquarters and civil authorities such as the police and fire brigades;
- operate search-light batteries.

Sydney Fighter Sector Headquarters, known as No. 1 Fighter Sector Headquarters (1FSHQ), was established on 25 February 1942 and was responsible for the aerial defence of New South Wales. A temporary operations and plotting room were set up at the Capitol Picture Theatre in Bankstown (now the site of Bankstown Town Hall). Less than two months later, on 16 April, 1FSHQ handed over its responsibilities to the US Army Air Corps and the unit was disbanded. In the next few months, the United States Army Air Corps (USAAC) relocated air defence operations to a disused railway tunnel near St James railway station in the city.

On 3 August 1942 1FSHQ was reformed under the command of the RAAF Headquarters Eastern Area and the 1FSHQ once again took over responsibility for the air defence of New South Wales. The operations room was moved back to the Capitol Theatre in Bankstown on 7 September 1942. At this time the 1FSHQ comprised 19 officers and 164 other ranks, including 119 members of the Women's Auxiliary Australian Air Force (WAAAF). The senior RAAF officers were largely drawn from aircrew, with junior RAAF officers being intelligence or administrative officers. Two of the unit officers were WAAAF officers and there were also Army and Navy officers in the unit for liaison duties. The enlisted personnel included:

Operators of telephones, teleprinters, radio telegraphy and telephony equipment who received the reports on aircraft movements from: radar stations, members of the Volunteer Air Observers Corps (Australia), ships, No. 2 and No. 8 Fighter Sector Headquarters, and by other means;

- Clerks who plotted the location of aircraft and shipping on large maps;
- Technicians who maintained the communications equipment; and
- Support staff such as administrative clerks, cooks and drivers.

Between October 1943 and January 1945 the 1FSHQ underwent several name changes. On 18 October 1943 it was renamed the No. 101 Fighter Sector and then on 7 March 1944 the name was changed to No. 101 Fighter Control Unit. On 21 January 1945 the unit was renamed Air Defence Headquarters Sydney (ADHQ Sydney) and air defence operations were moved into a purpose-built operations room located at Condell Park. By this time many of the RAAF members of the unit had been posted to northern Australia or New Guinea and members of the No. 2 Volunteer Air Observers Corps (VAOC) had taken their places.

=== Air Defence Headquarters Sydney ===
Documentary evidence indicates that the search for a permanent site to construct a purpose-built combined Fighter Sector Headquarters and Gun Operation Room was underway by August 1942. Eventually the site of a shallow quarry on Black Charlie's Hill was selected. The site had extensive views to the east, west and to the south and on a clear day, reportedly the arch of the Sydney Harbour Bridge could be seen. The land, which was owned by the Bankstown Hospital Trust, was resumed under National Security Regulations. The Commonwealth Government later acquired the site in circa August 1945.

Approval for the construction of the Fighter Sector Headquarters was given by the Minister of Air, as an urgent war measure, on 7 November 1942. Work on the two-storey underground bunker was scheduled to begin in January 1943 and surviving documentation indicates that by April the foundations of the structure were well under way. Construction of the Fighter Sector Headquarters was completed by August 1944, with the exception of the installation of the telephone and signals cables, which were to be installed by the Post Master General's Office in November of that year.

The main contractor of the project was Stuart Bros of Sydney. Bankstown Municipal Council carried out the electrical reticulation of the building and the air conditioning equipment appears to have been supplied and installed by Carrier Air Conditioning Limited of Spring Street, Sydney. The estimated cost to construct the bunker and the above ground, support buildings which included: an Administration Building, Rest Rooms and Kitchen, Male and Female Latrines, and Garage, was A£20,400. The final cost of the project was A£36,255.

When completed the building comprised a ground floor and basement, at the heart of which was a two-storey high Operations Room. The Operations Room was dominated by a large plotting table, on which the WAAAF personnel plotted aircraft movements. Other key operational areas of the bunker included: a Gun Operations Room (anti-aircraft guns), the Search-light Operations Room and the Naval Plotting Room.

The new covert Air Defence Headquarters became operational in January 1945. The unit history report for this period indicates that 49 officers and 128 other ranks of the RAAF and WAAAF staffed the ADHQ along with personnel from the Army, Navy and Volunteer Air Corp. However, as the ADHQ operated 24 hours a day, 7 days a week not all of the assigned personnel were on duty at one time. For security reasons, the personnel were transported to and from the ADHQ by bus. Accommodation for ADHQ personnel was located in the Bankstown Shopping area.

With the end of WWII in the Pacific in September 1945, the VAOC ceased full-time operations and the RAAF and WAAAF staff were demobilised. In January 1947 the ADHQ unit was disbanded and the bunker closed. The building remained unoccupied until c. 1965, when it was briefly reoccupied by the Navy for naval manoeuvres in the Pacific. Following the conclusion of those manoeuvres the building was once again closed up. The bunker lay largely undisturbed until April 1971 when Phil Engisch, editor of the Bankstown - Canterbury Torch newspaper, accompanied by Alderman Leslie Gillman and others, toured the facility. Following the tour, the location of the ADHQ was made public in an article published in the Torch newspaper. The article, entitled "The Torch uncovers secret RAAF war base" was also simultaneously published in The Daily Telegraph and Sydney Morning Herald.

In the article Engisch recorded how the tour party wandered through a maze of corridors and intact rooms, likening the experience to "...something one might expect to see in a Sean Connery 007 movie." Unfortunately, approximately four months after the location of the bunker was made public, the interior of the building was destroyed by fire. The fire is thought to have been started by either homeless people taking shelter in the bunker, or vandals. The blaze began on the evening of 9 August and is said to have burned for more than a week.

In the early 1970s the Department of Defence handed over the 4-hectare (9-acre) site to the Commonwealth Department of Housing. In 1976 a Defence Housing Authority medium density housing scheme, designed by architectural firm Robertson and Hindmarsh Pty Ltd, was constructed on the former ADHQ site. The housing estate was designed to ensure that the underground bunker was located in one of the open spaces of the estate. It was at this time that the above ground, support buildings for the bunker were demolished.

The exact location of the main entry and exit passages into the bunker are not known, as the area over the top and sides of the building has been landscaped concealing the bunker's existence. However, in the 1980s and 1990s the bunker was entered at least three occasions. On one such occasion, a film crew from the popular television show Burke's Backyard, crawled through an air vent into the facility and the television show's host, Don Burke, hosted an episode of the show from the bunker. Footage from the television show and photographs taken by other individuals who have gained entry to the building indicate that the facility is structurally intact.

=== Associated buildings ===
Air Board documentation indicates that the Fighter Sector VHF/RT system (Very High Frequency Radio Transmission System) was to comprise: 3 VHF/DF (Direction Finder) fixer stations, 1 VHF/DF homing station, 1 remote (local) transmitting station, 1 remote (local) receiving station and 2 relay stations (each consisting of a receiver and transmitter). In the case of the Sydney ADHQ relay stations were considered unnecessary by Defence authorities as it was anticipated that the height of the sites selected for the new VHF transmitter and receiver stations would ensure satisfactory communications. As it turned out, the new transmitting and receiver stations were never built and the Sydney ADHQ relied on the existing receiving station at Picnic Point, Revesby and the existing transmitting station at Johnston Street, Bass Hill. According to surviving documents radar stations at Robertson, Wentworth Falls and Somersby were to acted as VHF/DF Fixer stations for the ADHQ.

Other radar stations known to have passed on information (usually by telephone) to 1FSHQ and therefore probably to the ADHQ, were No. 17 Radar Station located at Moruya, No. 18 Radar Station located at Kiama, No. 19 Radar Station located at Bombi near Gosford and No. 101 Radar Station located on North Head, Sydney. Information would also have been passed on from No. 2 Fighter Sector Headquarters at Lambton and No. 8 Fighter Sector Headquarters at Brisbane.

=== Other Fighter Sector Headquarters ===
No 2. Fighter Sector Headquarters formed at New Lambton on 25 February 1942. The unit commandeered the New Lambton Public School for its operations before moving to Ash Island on 3 December 1944. No. 2 Fighter Sector Headquarters was to be responsible for fighter aircraft control and coordination for the Newcastle and Hunter region. However, it appears that 2FSHQ was non-operational and functioned as a training facility while, located at New Lambton. There is no indication that a purpose-built headquarters (similar to that built in Condell Park) was constructed for this unit.

No. 3 Fighter Sector Headquarters was formed at Townsville on 25 February 1942. The unit controlled fighter operations and anti-aircraft defences through North Queensland and New Guinea. The unit operated from a grammar school at North Ward until a semi underground bunker (identified as such because all the cabling was laid underground), was constructed between 1942 and 1943. The new fighter sector headquarters was built on the lower slopes of Mount Stuart and became fully operational on 20 December 1944. In 1962 or 1963 the interior of the bunker was destroyed by fire.

No. 5 Fighter Sector Headquarters was formed at Darwin on 25 February, six days after the bombing of Darwin by Japanese forces. The unit was responsible for all air operations over northern Australia, from Broome to Cape York. Initially the Fighter Sector Headquarters operated out of tents and then a rough shed at Sandfly Gully, a kilometre south of the Darwin airstrip. At a later date an Operations Room was constructed at Berrimah, 15 km east of Darwin. Information provided by men who worked at the site indicates that the building was a semi underground structure, that initially comprising one room but which was later expanded to two rooms. In the years following the close of WWII the exact location of the Berrimah Operations Room was lost, however, in 1995 a search for the building was initiated and by 1997 intact concrete floors of two adjacent rooms (tentatively identified as those of the Filter Room and Operations Room) had been identified on Berrimah Farm.

No. 6 Fighter Sector Headquarters was formed in Perth on 22 April 1942. An Operations Room was set up in the Alma Street Masonic Hall at Mount Lawley. Between January and March 1945 the unit moved into a new underground bunker in Epsom Avenue in Belmont, Perth. The Heritage Council of Western Australia's data inventory sheet for the Belmont Bunker, describes the bunker as having moderate to high integrity, with a few alterations taking place to convert the former Fighter Sector Headquarters to a potential operations headquarters for the Civil Defence and Emergency Department (also known as the State Emergency Service).

No 7 Fighter Sector Headquarters, like the other Fighter Sector Headquarters, was formed in haste (on 4 May 1942) and the Operations Room was set up in the Preston Town Hall, Melbourne. No. 7 Fighter Sector Headquarters appears to have remained at the Preston Town Hall until February 1946 when it was moved to the RAAF Williams base at Point Cook. There does not appear to have been a purpose-built headquarters (similar to the Condell Park facility) constructed for this unit.

No. 8 Fighter Sector Headquarters was originally operated by the US Eighth Fighter Group, USAAC. When the 8th Fighter Group was reassigned to Townsville the Fighter Sector Headquarters was briefly taken over by the 565th Aircraft Warning Battalion, US Army. The No. 8 Fighter Sector Headquarters RAAF was formed on 3 August 1942. The unit was located on the 3rd level of the Wills Building in Ann Street, Brisbane. The building has since been demolished.

== Description ==
The Former Air Defence Headquarters (ADHQ) occupied a nine-acre site, which was enclosed by a 6-foot (1.8 m) high barbwire man proofed camouflaged fence. The eastern half of the site was dissected by a gravel road which ran across the site in a north–south direction. The main entrance to the site was the southern termination of this road. A second entry/exit point was located at the northern end of the gravel road.

The largest structure on the site was a two-storey underground bunker from where the air defence of New South Wales was controlled. In addition to the bunker, a 1942 site plan indicates that there were to be five above ground, support structures on the site. The buildings comprised: an Administration Hut, Rest Room and Kitchen Hut, a Female Latrine, a Male Latrine, and a Motor Transport Garage. The support buildings were located close to the southern boundary of this site, just west of the gravel road.

Today, the Former Air Defence Headquarters lies under one of the open spaces of a housing estate built on the site in the 1970s. The area over the top and sides of the building has been landscaped concealing the building's existence. The exact location of the main entry and exit passages into the bunker are not known. Images of the interior of the bunker taken in the 1980s and 1990s, indicate that despite the fire that gutted the interior the building is structurally intact.

=== Detailed description ===
The following description of the Air Defence Headquarters and above ground, support buildings has been taken largely from a site plan dated 4 November 1942, floor layout and section drawings dated 3 March 1943, A plan of alterations and additions to the ADHQ (specifically the Gun Room, Army Switch and Test Room) dated 27 August 1943 and the building specification dated circa November 1942.

=== Support buildings ===
Four of the above ground, support buildings are shown on the 1942 site plan as being grouped around a driveway, which branched off the main gravel road in a westerly direction, near the southern boundary of the site. The fifth building (the Female Latrine) was short distance to the north of the main group.

According to the 1942 site plan, the first buildings encountered along the driveway were the Administration Building on the south side of the driveway with the Rest Room and Kitchen Building directly opposite. Each of the buildings comprised two "c series" military huts. The Administration Building (C15 military huts) included office space, a General Masters store and an orderly room. A kitchen, canteen and store were at the centre of the Rest Room and Kitchen Building (C7 military huts). The Equipment Officer's Room and the officers buffet and rest room were located on one side of the kitchen-canteen complex with the other ranks buffet and rest room located on the other.

The next building encountered along the driveway was the Male Latrine, which was located on the north side of the driveway and comprised a single "c series" (c.12) military hut. The latrine was divided into two areas with the officer's latrine located in the eastern end and facilities for the other ranks located in the western end of the building. Between the Rest Room and Kitchen Building and the Male Latrine, and to the north of these buildings was the Female Latrine, which also comprised a single 'c series (c.12) military hut. Unlike the Male Latrine there was no division between officers and other ranks, in facilities provided. At end of the drive was the garage comprising four posts and skillion roof.

=== Air Defence Headquarters ===
The Former Air Defence Headquarters is a semi-underground bunker that became fully underground after construction. The building was constructed using a "cut and fill" method. The soil excavated from digging the basement level into the natural ground, was used to cover the second-storey which was constructed above ground.

The underground bunker comprised two levels, a ground floor and basement both 9 ft (2.7 m) in height. The exterior walls of the structure were constructed of brick approximately 2 ft (61 cm) in thickness, and were protected with earth filling. The Interior partition walls were mostly constructed of brick and timber and clad with caneite. A visitor to the bunker in the 1970s stated that the interior was painted "in army colours." The ceiling and floors comprised reinforced concrete 4 in (10 cm) thick. The flat, overhanging concrete roof of the bunker, was at least 18 in (46 cm) thick and was designed survive a direct hit from a 500 1b bomb. A 3/4 in (1.9 cm) thick layer of asphalt was laid over the flat concrete roof as a damp course. The asphalt was then covered by at least 2 ft 3 in (69 cm) of earth fill.

The entrance to the bunker appears to have been located approximately midway long the eastern facade of the bunker and was accessed via concrete passage strategically placed behind an earth embankment. An assessment of the fire protection measures required for the 1FSHQ (both temporary HQ and new building) undertaken in December 1943, noted that there were "emergency escapes" at the south and north ends of the building. An exit from the south end of the building from ground floor level, is shown on floor plans of bunker dated March 1943.

=== Ground floor layout ===
The floor plan indicates that the ground floor of the bunker is essentially rectangular in shape, with a small rectangular shaped extension attached to the south-west corner of the bunker. The ground floor measures approximately 97' and 1 1/4" along its western side (excluding the extension), 54' along its northern end, 97' and 1 1/4" along its eastern side and 35' and 4 1/2" along its southern side (excluding the extension). Equating to an approximate size of 29.60 x 16.46 x 29.60 x 10.78 metres. The rectangular-shaped extension measures 20' and 7 1/2" by 18' and 7 1/2" (approximately 6.27 x 5.68 metres)

As stated above, entrance to the bunker was gained through the eastern facade of the building. After passing through the concrete passageway a visitor to the bunker would emerge in a light lock, access to the bunker was through a door in the wall immediately in front of them. Stepping through the door, a visitor would find themself confronting a guard, who was no doubt tasked with vetting the identity of anyone who gained access to the bunker. To the left of the entry door stretched an almost 8 metres long corridor which led to the Army Buffet, with access to AWAS Latrine, located at its southern end. Immediately in front of the entry door (across the passage) was an antechamber. A door in the north wall of the chamber led to the optical angulator.

According to the floor plan, if a visitor turned right upon entering the bunker, and followed the corridor as it ran north along the eastern perimeter of the building they would find the Signals Room, which was located in the north-east corner of the bunker. The Signals Room was where incoming communications form the telephone, teleprinters and radar would be sorted before being distributed to the relevant people in the ADHQ. Turning left at the Signals Room provided access to a corridor that ran almost the length of the northern end of the ground floor. The first door encountered on the north side of the corridor was the door to the Signals Room, followed by door openings to the Cypher and Intelligence Room (where messages where encoded and decoded when security was required), the P.B.X Switch (private business telephone exchange), RAAF buffet, WAAAF Latrine, RAAF Male Latrine. At the end of the corridor (in the north-west corner of the bunker) was the Post Master General's (PMG) Frame Room. The PMG was responsible for supplying the telegraphy and telephony cabling to the ADHQ.

The two-storey high Operations Room formed the centrepiece of the bunker. The floor plan indicates that the Operations Room would have been dominated by a large plotting table on which would have been painted a map with appropriate map references. Plotters, members of the WAAAF, would use the plotting table to plot aircraft movements, passed through from the Filter Room. At the eastern end of the upper part of the Operations Room (ground floor level), was the Controllers Gallery. The Controller was generally a pilot of senior rank who was equipped with telephones and a radio. The radio allowed him to speak directly to fighter aircraft sent to interpret hostile aircraft. A series of four R/T (Radio Telephony) Cabinet Rooms were accessible from the eastern end of the Controllers Gallery. Projecting out over the western end, of the upper part of the Operations Room, was a small platform, that gave access to indicator boards presumably associated with the Teleprinter and Traffic Room, located immediately behind the platform. The room immediately adjacent to the south wall of the Teleprinter and Traffic Room housed Emergency Wireless Telegraph/Telephony equipment.

The northern half of the bunker was dominated by the upper part of the two-storey high Volunteer Air Observers Corp (V.A.O.C) and R/D/F (Radar Directional Finder) Filter Rooms. The Filter Room was where reports of aircraft sighting were "filtered" to establish their height and bearing. The Movements Gallery, where all allied aircraft movements in the operational area were recorded, was sandwiched between the upper part of the V.A.O.C R/D/F rooms and the upper part of the Operation Room. The Guns Room (anti-aircraft guns) and the Search-Light Operations Room dominated the southern half of the ground floor of the bunker. Adjacent to the southern wall of the Guns Room was an Army Switch Room (south-west corner of the main section of the bunker) and a Test Room.

Exiting through a door opening in the east wall of the Test Room provided access to a corridor that ran in an east–west direction. Lining the south side of the corridor were three height converter booths. An additional height converter booth was located on the north side of the corridor. Immediately north of this room was the Search-Light Operations Room. At the eastern end of corridor on north side was the Male Army Latrine. Immediately north of Latrine was the Australian Women's Army Service (AWAS) Latrine and Army Buffet mentioned earlier.

A door opening in the south wall of the Army Switch Room (referred to above) provided access to one of two Air Conditioning Rooms, which occupied the northern end of the small rectangular extension, that projects off the south-western corner of the ground floor of the bunker. To the south of the Air Conditioning Rooms was located the power unit for the bunker and an emergency power generator. Access to the "emergency escape" exit located at the southern end of the bunker, appears to have been through an opening in the south wall of the area housing the emergency power generator.

=== Basement ===
According to the floor plan, the basement measures approximately 12 metres (39 ft 3.5 in) along its northern end, 22 metres (72 ft 5.75 in) along its western side, 21 metres (69 ft 1 in) along the length of the eastern elevation and 14 metres (46 ft 5 in) along its southern end. The centre of the east elevation of the basement is indented, giving the basement level the appearance of a capitalised letter "E" when viewed in plan. The Operations Room dominates the centre of the basement. At the eastern end of the Operations Room was the Intercept Officer's dais. The Intercept Officer was responsible for plotting the best course in intercept enemy aircraft. The V.A.O.C and R/D/F Filter Rooms dominate the northern half of the basement. On the south side of the Operations Room is the Naval Plot Room. The basement floor plan indicates that this room contained a long narrow plot table which occupied almost the entire length of the room.

Information provided in the newspaper article written by Phil Engisch, indicates that there may have been was some adjustment to the floor plan of the ADHQ, after the March 1943 plan was produced. Engisch noted in his article that the bunker had toilet and shower facilities (whereas the plans appear to show latrines only). Engisch also recorded the presence of a small number of bedrooms, which are not shown on the 1943 floor plans of the building. It is also possible that these modifications date from the 1960s when the ADHQ was used for naval manoeuvres in the Pacific.

=== Condition ===
A few months after the existence of the bunker was made public in April 1971, the interior of the bunker was gutted by fire. The bunker has been accessed on several occasions since the fire. Peter Treseder, in an article published in the January–March 1994 issue of Australian Geographic, claimed that in 1987 he entered the bunker. Treseder described the bunker as being "...a blackened shell with lots of rooms and passages running off at various levels." A group known as the Bunker Boyz entered the bunker in c. 1996. Photographs of members of the group inside the bunker show the bunker to be structurally intact. Currently, there is no access to the interior of bunker.

The interior of the bunker was destroyed by fire. Currently there is no access into the bunker, however images of the interior of the building indicate that it is structurally intact.

=== Inside the bunker ===
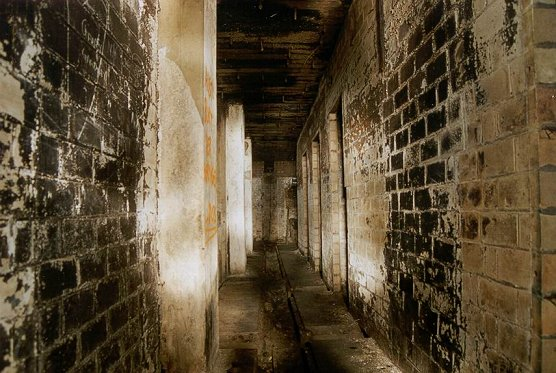
Inside one of the bunker hallways

The Bankstown Bunker was of similar design to the underground Ops rooms of wartime England, which directed Britain's air defence fighter plane attacks on the invading German Luftwaffe. Entrance to the bunker was obtained via a concrete passageway concealed beneath a grassy slope with corridors and hallways leading to various sections.

The walls of the bunker were 1.5 metres thick and it could almost withstand a direct hit from a 300 lb (140 kg) bomb. It had all the attenuated fixtures necessary to run a top secret operational defence base. It consisted of three Fixer Stations and one Homing Station. There were switchboards directing up to fifty telephone lines that went to various locations including radar stations and VAOC lookout posts which reported aircraft locations to the bunker. The bunker was also equipped with its own code room, plotting rooms, two escape tunnels and a radio transmitter room. In the centre of the bunker was a large room of about two stories in height. This was the main Ops room and control centre for all RAAF Missions in the Pacific area. The room also had a large map, (24' x 18') denoting troop positions in the South West Pacific theatre of World War II.

The facilities inside the bunker also had to cater for the full-time staff who lived and worked in the facility, working on a rotating roster that involved living in the bunker for two-week periods. The living quarters consisted of its own kitchen, dining area, bathrooms and bedrooms. The bunker also had its own generator and air conditioning.

There are rumours of a tunnel running from the bunker to an unknown location.

=== Modifications and dates ===
A fire that started on 9 August 1971 destroyed the interior of the bunker. The air vents, electricity and wireless telegraphy/telephony poles mounted on the roof of the bunker were removed in association with the 1976 redevelopment of the site by the Commonwealth Department of Housing. The above ground, support buildings were also demolished as part of the redevelopment of the site in the 1970s.

== Location ==
There is a small reserve between the town houses at the end of Taylor Street. It is under this hill that the bunker has been buried. The entrance to the bunker has now been sealed and the area over the top of the bunker has been landscaped to conceal its position, to the point where it is completely undetectable from the street.

=== Other bunkers in the City of Bankstown ===
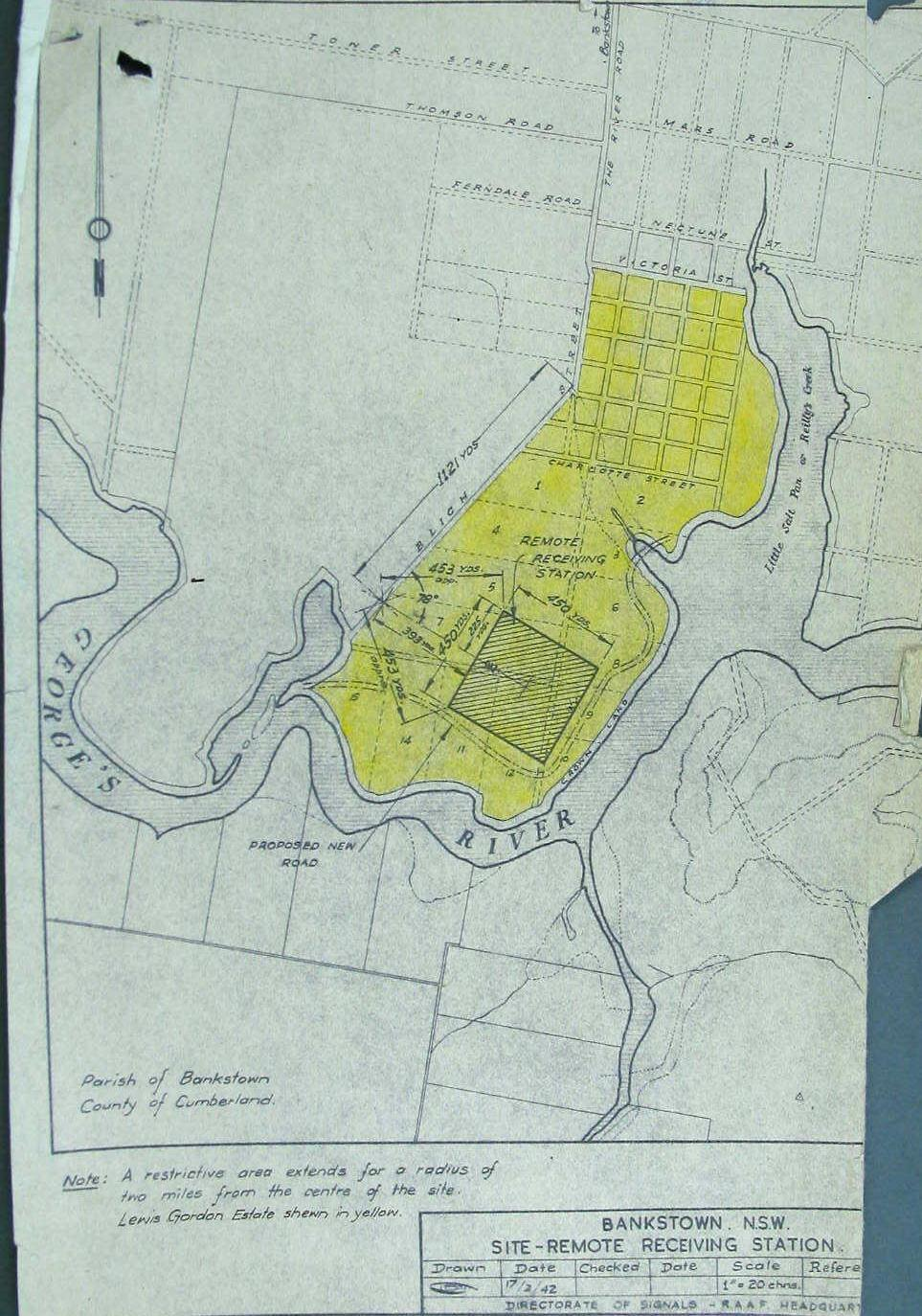
The remote receiving station. Map date 17 February 1942.

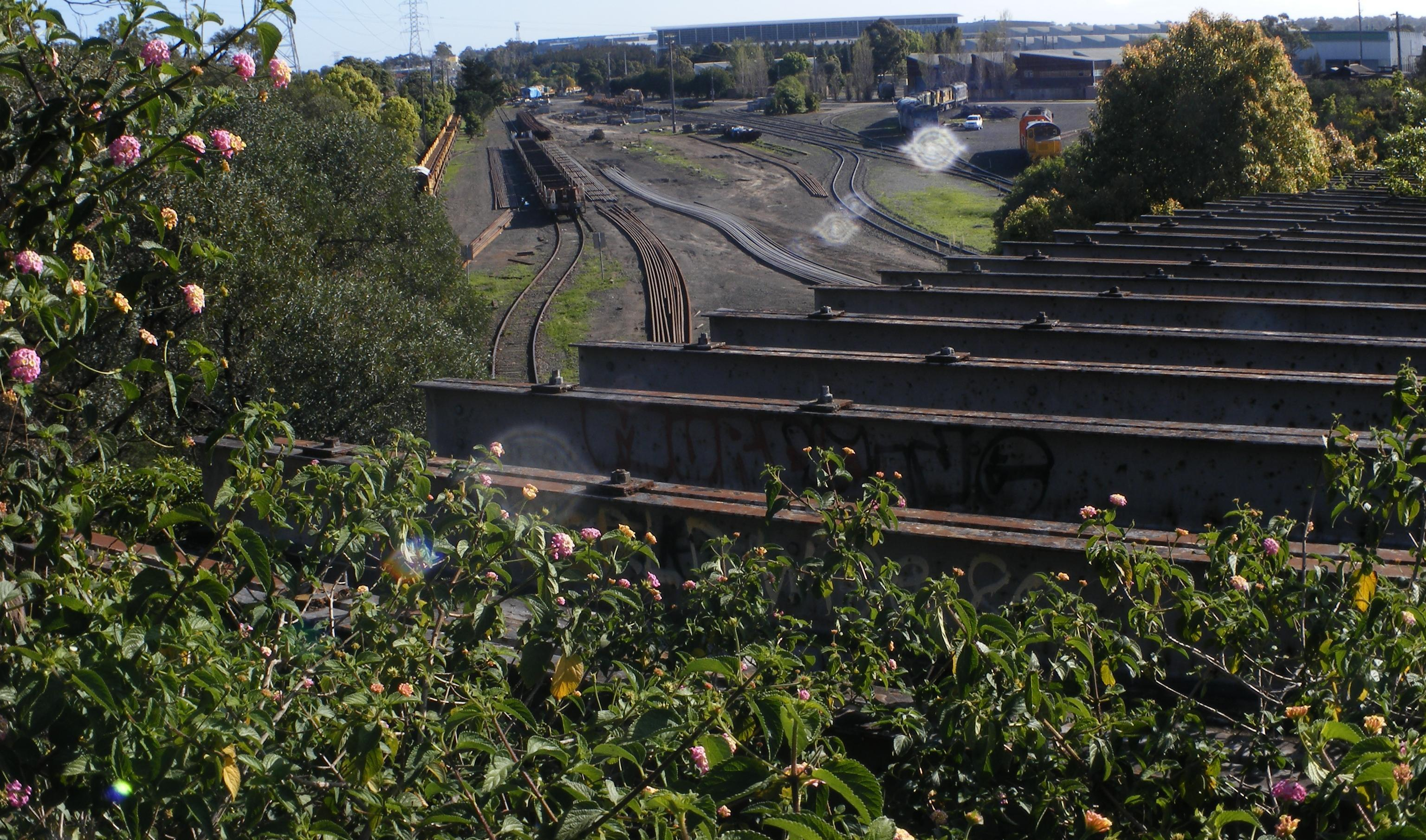
Chullora Railway Workshops and former site of WWII manufacturing plant.

There is one other confirmed bunker, a "Remote Receiving station", in Bankstown. Little is known about its history though it was reportedly "heavily vandalised" in 1945. It was located in Picnic Point National Park, near the South Sydney Power station. According to residents of the area, it still exists. Based on a comparison of contemporary and historic maps, the Receiving Station and the present day Sydney South electricity substation share the same footprint, with the latter apparently situated directly above the former. The substation is bounded on its southwestern and southeastern sides by Henry Lawson Drive, in the Georges River National Park. It is alleged that there are several other bunkers in the Bankstown area, such as under an electricity block house on the corner of Milperra Road and Henry Lawson Drive, and a demolished bunker under Condell Park High School.

During World War II, Bankstown was a hive for military activity. Bankstown Airport was home to several fighter units and several "dummy houses" existed in and around Bankstown Airport. These houses were built to make Bankstown Airport and its surrounds appear as a farm. Military personnel who worked in Bankstown lived in the area around Chapel Road (where Paul Keating Park and the council chambers are located today). Training facilities for the various plotting rooms around Sydney were also located in the area.

During World War II a major wartime manufacturing plant was located in Chullora. The site once occupied 100 acres (40 ha) of land surrounded by Rookwood Cemetery, Brunker Road, the Hume Highway and Centenary Drive. The site was said to have been the largest secret manufacturing plant in Australia which was used for the production of military weapons, plane components, tanks, and ordnance. Over two thousand men and woman were employed to work at the factory on a daily basis. During the war the factory produced components for 700 Bristol Beaufort, 380 Bristol Beaufighter and up to 50 Avro Lincoln aircraft. Over 54 ACI tanks were built as well as 60 General Lee tanks that were adapted for use in the Australian Military, as were local jeeps in the '70s. The factory also produced 81 cupola turrets for the British Matilda tanks.

An underground "bunker" and tunnel system is apparently located on this site. It is directly under a block of flats in Davidson Street and Marlene Crescent. The entrance to the "bunker" is by steel doors set in concrete into the hillside in a railway cutting which runs from alongside the railway line parallel to Marlene Crescent at a platform called the Railwelders and which leads under the block of flats. The doors to this "bunker" were welded up in the late 1980s. The ventilation shafts that were once visible from the Hume Highway have been removed.

Apart from the bunker, there is also a network of storage facilities that extend under the railway workshop. Sometime between 1977 and 1978 the steel access doors were fitted with locks (Railway SL type). The steel access doors were bolted into the side of a stormwater drain which runs along the old Roads & Traffic Authority building in Chullora, then under the Hume Highway and eventually under the rail workshop. It has also been alleged that a tunnel approximately four miles long connects this complex with the Bankstown Bunker.

== Representation in popular culture ==
The Bankstown Bunker was featured on an episode of Burke's Backyard. Don Burke conducted part of the show from inside the bunker. To enter the bunker he had to crawl in through an air vent.

== Heritage listing ==
The former WWII Sydney Air Defence Headquarters (ADHQ) was conceived and planned at a time when the Australian military was undergoing an expansion due to the perceived threat of invasion by Japan. A purpose-built, Fighter Sector Headquarters (later ADHQ) was considered key to the defence of the Sydney region. The Sydney ADHQ, which came into operation in January 1945, was an integral part of Australia's defence network during the latter stage of WWII.

The former Air Defence Headquarters at Condell Park is the only facility of its type, built in NSW during WWII. The underground bunker is one of four, purpose-built WW2 ADHQ in Australia, of which only three survive. The building has considerable research potential in terms of its ability to yield information (that may not be available from other sources) about the design, fabric and construction of this rare WW2 facility.

The bunker is of State and potentially National significance as a representative example of an Australian designed WWII Fighter Control Unit. With the exception of the provision of a naval plotting room, the building was constructed in accordance with a standard design agreed upon by all three of the military services. It is part of a small group of Fighter Control Units, which collectively illustrates a representative type.

The Former Air Defence Headquarters is associated with former service men and women of all three branches of the military, as well as former members of the No. 2 Volunteer Observers Corps (Australia). The men and women who worked in the bunker were responsible for the air defence of New South Wales, during the latter part of WWII.

Despite the fact that the interior of the bunker has been damaged by fire, there is considerable community interest in the Former Air Defence Headquarters (popularly referred to as 'the Bankstown Bunker'). It has been the subject of a number of newspaper articles and it was featured on a popular television series, Burkes Backyard in the 1990s. Today information about the bunker can be found on numerous sites on the World Wide Web.

Bankstown Bunker was listed on the New South Wales State Heritage Register on 18 November 2011 having satisfied the following criteria.

The place is important in demonstrating the course, or pattern, of cultural or natural history in New South Wales.

The former WWII Sydney Air Defence Headquarters (ADHQ) was conceived and planned at a time when the Australian military was undergoing an expansion due to the perceived threat of invasion by Japan. A purpose-built, Fighter Sector Headquarters (later ADHQ) was considered key to the defence of the Sydney region. Construction of No. 1 Fighter Sector Headquarters was approved by the Minister of Air, in November 1942, as an urgent war measure. The Sydney ADHQ which came into operation in January 1945, was an integral part of Australia's defence network during the latter stages of WWII.

The place has a strong or special association with a person, or group of persons, of importance of cultural or natural history of New South Wales's history.

The underground bunker, which served as the Sydney Air Defence Headquarters from 1945 to 1947, is associated with former service men and women of all three branches of the military as well as former members of the No. 2 Volunteer Observers Corps (Australia). The men and women who worked in the bunker were responsible for the air defence of New South Wales, during the latter part of WW2.

The place has a strong or special association with a particular community or cultural group in New South Wales for social, cultural or spiritual reasons.

Despite the fact that the interior of the bunker has been damaged by fire, there is considerable community interest in the Former Sydney Air Defence Headquarters (popularly referred to as 'the Bankstown Bunker'). It has been the subject of a number of newspaper articles and it was featured on a popular television series, Burkes Backyard in the 1990s. Today information about the bunker can be found on numerous sites on the World Wide Web.

The place has potential to yield information that will contribute to an understanding of the cultural or natural history of New South Wales.

The Former Air Defence Headquarters at Condell Park has considerable research potential, in terms of its ability to yield information (that may not be available from other sources) about the design, fabric and construction of this rare WW2 facility.

The place possesses uncommon, rare or endangered aspects of the cultural or natural history of New South Wales.

The Former Air Defence Headquarters at Condell Park is the only facility of its type, built in NSW during WW2. The underground bunker is one of four purpose built WW2 Air Defence Headquarters in Australia, of which only three survive.

The place is important in demonstrating the principal characteristics of a class of cultural or natural places/environments in New South Wales.

The Former Air Defence Headquarters at Condell Park is of State and potentially National significance as a representative example of an Australian designed WW2 Fighter Control Unit. With the exception of the provision of a naval plotting room, the building was constructed in accordance with a standard design agreed upon by all three of the military services. It is part of a small group of Fighter Control units, which collectively illustrates a representative type.

== See also ==
- Military history of Australia
- Bunkers in Oceania
