= Glenn Taylor =

Glenn Taylor may refer to:

- Glenn Taylor (politician), Alberta Party, Canada
- Glenn Taylor (rugby union) (born 1970), former New Zealand rugby union player
- Glenn Taylor (television presenter), Australian television presenter

== See also ==
- Glen Taylor (born 1941), American businessman and former politician
- Glen H. Taylor (1904–1984), American politician from Idaho
