= Rosemary Stanton =

Australian nutritionist and dietician (born 1944)

Rosemary Stanton OAM
- Born: Rosemary Alison Finley; 5 June 1944 (age 81); Sydney, Australia
- Education: University of Sydney, Royal Prince Alfred Hospital
- Occupations: Nutritionist and dietician
- Known for: Raising public awareness of public health food issues

External image
- Photograph of Rosemary Stanton, n.d.

Rosemary Alison Stanton OAM (née Finley) (born 5 June 1944, Sydney, New South Wales) is an Australian nutritionist and dietician, known for her media appearances.

== Biography ==
Stanton has been called "the first 'celebrity' dietitian". As of 2018, Stanton had written 33 books, including several textbooks, many scientific papers and over 3500 articles. She has been a regular guest on many TV programs, including The Investigators and the Checkout (ABC) and was a presenter on Burke's Backyard.

Stanton was awarded the Medal of the Order of Australia in 1998 for her services to community health. She has been awarded an honorary doctorate for her many publications and role in public health, and is a Visiting Fellow in the School of Medical Sciences at the University of New South Wales.

During her childhood, Stanton's family were members of the Plymouth Brethren. While Stanton had wanted to go to university to become a medical doctor, this was not permitted, so she left the sect. She took up a cadetship with the NSW Department of Health and studied Science, majoring in biochemistry and pharmaceutical Chemistry. She then completed post-graduate qualifications in nutrition and dietetics at the University of Sydney and Royal Prince Alfred Hospital.

Stanton worked at the NSW Department of Health in University vacations from 1962 to 1966 and then permanently from 1966 to 1968. Stanton had a regular column in Cleo from its first issue and also wrote for many other magazines.

Stanton is well known for her criticism of sugary drinks, junk foods, supplements with unproven claims and has been described as "renowned for her no-nonsense approach to nutrition advice". She is an advocate for the Stephanie Alexander School Kitchen Garden Program and for organic food, arguing that it has fewer contaminants and that production of organic food is less damaging to the environment.

Stanton was a member of the National Health and Medical Research Council's Dietary Guidelines Working Committee, which revised the federal Department of Health's Australian Dietary Guidelines. Stanton also received the Food Media Nutrition Writers Award in 2008, 2001 and 1995.

She writes for The Conversation and is part of their Community Council.
