= Jennifer Marohasy =

Australian biologist, columnist and blogger

Jennifer Marohasy (born 1963) is an Australian biologist, columnist and blogger. She was a senior fellow at the free-market think tank the Institute of Public Affairs between 2004 and 2009 and director of the Australian Environment Foundation until 2008. She holds a PhD in biology from the University of Queensland. She is sceptical of anthropogenic global warming and co-authored a peer-reviewed paper in GeoResJ suggesting that most of the recent warming is attributable to natural variations, a view disputed by climate scientists.

== Career ==
Marohasy worked as a field biologist in Africa and Madagascar during the 1980s and 1990s, and has a number of published papers in science journals.

In 1997 she switched from researcher to environment manager with the Queensland sugar industry. In 1998, Marohasy received a PhD on the biological control of weeds. In 2001, she started to develop an interest in environmental campaigns and, in particular, claiming that there are anomalies between fact and perception regarding the health of coastal river systems and the Great Barrier Reef.

In July 2003, she became director of the environment unit at the Institute of Public Affairs (IPA).

As of November 2022, Marohasy is a senior fellow at the IPA.

=== Institute of Public Affairs ===
While head of the Environment Unit at the Institute of Public Affairs, Marohasy compiled a backgrounder titled Myth and the Murray - measuring the real state of the river environment which was published by the Institute in December 2003. The Institute received a $40,000 donation from Murray Irrigation Limited at that time. This paper is quoted in the Interim Report of the Inquiry into future water supplies for Australia’s rural industries and communities of the House of Representatives Standing Committee on Agriculture, Fisheries and Forestry, March 2004. At a science round table of the committee, when asked for her views on how much water should be returned to the River Murray, Marohasy argued that there was no need for additional flows at that time and that we should test the results of current environmental measures before committing to more.

Marohasy was instrumental in establishing a joint programme with the Institute of Public Affairs and the University of Queensland, funded by Western Australian philanthropist, Bryant Macfie (A top 20 Shareholder in Strike Resources Limited).

== Public position on global warming ==
In a 2005 Australian Broadcasting Corporation interview she claimed that... "[i]t's not clear that climate change is being driven by carbon dioxide levels".

On the Australian Broadcasting Corporation Radio National program, Ockham's Razor, Marohasy said in 2005... "I agree with Professor Flannery that we need to reduce atmospheric carbon dioxide levels", later adding "But I completely reject the concept of 'sustainability science' and I am tired of being told the sky is about to fall in".

In a 2008 interview on the Australian Broadcasting Corporation Radio National program, Counterpoint, she claimed recent cooling by starting with the extreme temperature peak of the 1998 El Niño event.

In 2020, during and in the aftermath of the Black Summer Bushfires, Marohasy argued that climate change was not a contributing factor, and that the extent of the natural disaster was not as severe as some claimed.

== Disagreement with the Bureau of Meteorology ==
Marohasy disagreed with the Bureau of Meteorology (BOM), claiming in the Australian media that Cyclone Marcia's warning should be for a category 3 cyclone. BOM's Cyclone Marcia warning was for a category 5 cyclone. Marohasy cited data from Middle Percy Island station showing maximum wind gusts of 208 kilometres per hour. BOM stated however, that the strongest winds of the cyclone were on the eastern side, some 40 kilometres per hour faster - typical for cyclones in the southern hemisphere. The cyclone was gaining in strength. Middle Percy Island was on the western side of the cyclone. Middle Percy Island measuring equipment was destroyed by the cyclone and therefore the BOM data stream ceased. Marohasy's claim, that BOM's category 5 warning was based solely on computer modeling, was rejected by Bureau chief Rob Webb.

Jonathan Nott, a James Cook University specialist in extreme natural events, said the bureau numbers showed it was a category 5 rather than a 3. “I would agree with the bureau,’’ Nott said. “Percy didn’t get the strongest winds. They were substantially stronger to the east.’’

== See also ==
- Peter Ridd
