= Australian Environment Foundation =

The Australian Environment Foundation (AEF) is a not-for-profit advocacy organisation. It has disputed the values of some mainstream environmental assertions, and also on occasion the evidence used to support those assertions. The AEF is climate-change-denying, pro-logging, pro-big business, anti-wind energy, and against the Murray-Darling Basin plan.

== History ==
The formation of the AEF was first mooted at the Eureka Forum organised in December 2004 by the Institute of Public Affairs (IPA) and a number of resource user groups. It was formally launched on World Environment Day (5 June 2005) in the northern New South Wales town of Tenterfield.

The founding chairman was former Labor federal environment minister, Barry Cohen. A subsequent chairman was gardener, author and television presenter Don Burke. Reporting on the AEF's launch, the Melbourne broadsheet newspaper, The Age wrote: "Dr Marohasy said she acted as the group's leader as an individual and not part of the IPA." At the time of registration, the registered office was the same is the registered office of the IPA.

The group stated in its press release that "This new group will be vastly different to the established environment organisations that have had the ear of governments for some time. The AEF’s focus will be on making decisions based on science and what is good for both the environment and for people".

The organisation has been labelled a "fake environmental group" by community advocacy organisation GetUp!. In May 2014 the AEF came under criticism for lobbying for the de-listing of Tasmania's World Heritage old-growth forest.

== Personnel ==
=== Former directors ===
- Jennifer Marohasy, former director
- Barry Cohen, inaugural chairman of AEF, former ALP environment minister
- Don Burke, former chairman
