= Jennifer Keyte =

Australian journalist and news presenter (born 1960)

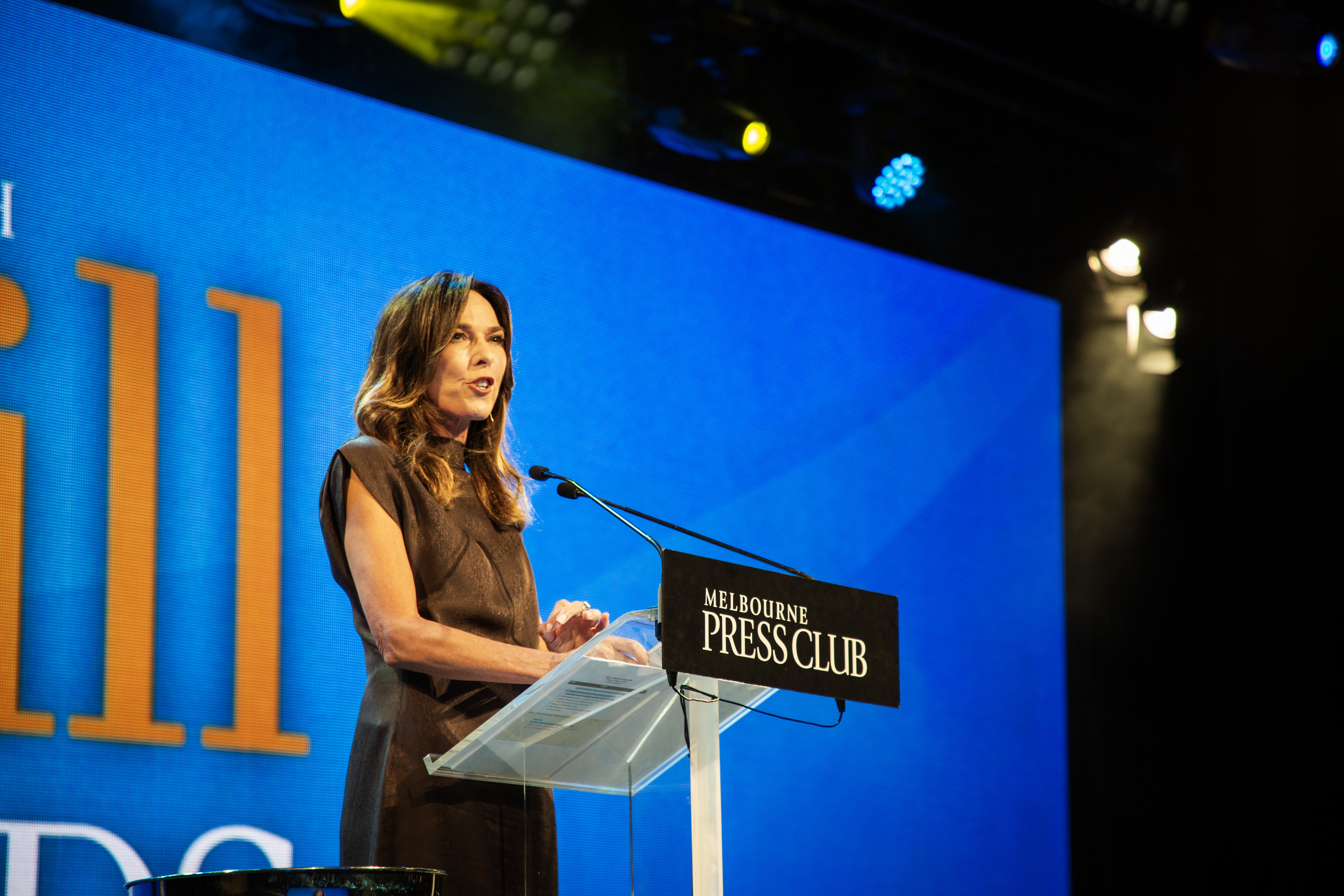
- Keyte accepts Melbourne Press Club Lifetime Achievement Award, March 2024.
- Born: Jennifer Anne Keyte; 21 January 1960 (age 66); Melbourne, Victoria
- Occupations: Journalist, television presenter
- Employer: Network 10
- Television: 10 News
- Children: 2

Jennifer Anne Keyte (born 21 January 1960) is an Australian journalist and news presenter.

Keyte currently presents 10 News Melbourne, and occasional national bulletins. She was previously a news presenter on Seven News in Melbourne.

== Education ==
After graduating from St. Columba's College, Essendon, Keyte enrolled in a Bachelor of Arts degree at La Trobe University but left after her first year.

== Career ==
Her broadcasting career began with a cadetship at EON FM in 1980, the first commercial FM radio station in Australia. She later joined 3XY as a journalist and newsreader.

In 1982, Keyte switched to television, joining ATV-10's Eyewitness News in Melbourne, reporting on courts, crime and state politics. She worked briefly on Good Morning Australia and presented weekend bulletins.

In 1986 she hosted a late night entertainment show called 'Nightlife' on channel 10.

In 1987, Keyte moved to HSV-7 where she co-anchored Seven Nightly News alongside Glenn Taylor. She also presented news on the late-night chat show Tonight Live with Steve Vizard. At the end of 1995, Keyte resigned, reportedly after the network proposed to pair her on the 6pm news in Melbourne with former ATV-10 colleague David Johnston.

In 1996, after a short stint at radio station 3AW, Keyte moved to Nine, hosting Good Medicine, and Moment of Truth. When Seven News ratings subsequently plunged further, Keyte refused their offers to return and stayed with Nine for several years.

In August 2003, she returned to the Seven Network, presenting the weekend news in Melbourne. This was a reversal of roles with Peter Mitchell, who previously anchored weekend news while Keyte was on weekdays. She has also filled in for Natalie Barr presenting the news on Sunrise, Seven Morning News and Seven 4.30 News.

In 2006, Keyte and others from Seven News were charged with and ultimately acquitted of contempt of court for allegedly publicising suppressed details of a Children's Court case.

In May 2018, Keyte rejoined Network Ten to present 10 News First Melbourne replacing Stephen Quartermain, who returned to his former role as sports presenter.

From September 2020 to February 2023, Keyte also presented the Adelaide edition of 10 News First following the transfer of studio production to Melbourne, while also continuing to present the 5pm news for Melbourne. Adelaide returned to local production in 2023, with Keyte remaining Melbourne presenter.

== Personal life ==
Keyte has two children. She and her husband, Ben Faggetter, separated in 2009 and later divorced.
