= Anne Davies (Australian journalist) =

Australian journalist

Anne Davies is an Australian journalist. She is a former Washington correspondent for Australian newspapers The Age and The Sydney Morning Herald and investigative journalist with The Guardian.

== Early life ==
She is an alumna of SCEGGS Darlinghurst, an inner-city school for girls in Sydney, Australia.

== Career ==
Davies has previously been the state political editor and urban affairs editor for The Sydney Morning Herald and also spent 10 years covering U.S. federal politics. She wrote an opinion column, "National Times", for The Sydney Morning Herald.

In 2002, she won a Gold Walkley, an investigative journalism award, with Kate McClymont for coverage of a rugby league salary cap scandal associated with the Canterbury Bulldogs. She is a member of the Media, Entertainment and Arts Alliance union in Australia.

She was a panelist in May 2010 at the Sydney Writers Festival.

Together with Helen Trinca, Davies co-authored the book Waterfront: The Battle That Changed Australia, (Doubleday/Transworld, 2000) about the 1998 stand-off between Patrick Stevedores and the Maritime Union of Australia.

In 2014, Davies wrote an article which incorrectly identified Melinda Pedavoli as a teacher who had resigned following allegations of sexual misconduct. Davies' conduct was found to be 'improper, unjustifiable or lacking in bona fides'.

Davies wrote more than 1,100 articles for The Guardian between 2017 and October 2023, the last two being on money laundering in horse-racing and the environmental effects of synthetic turf being used on playing fields.
