= Tracey Spicer =

Australian journalist

Tracey Spicer AM
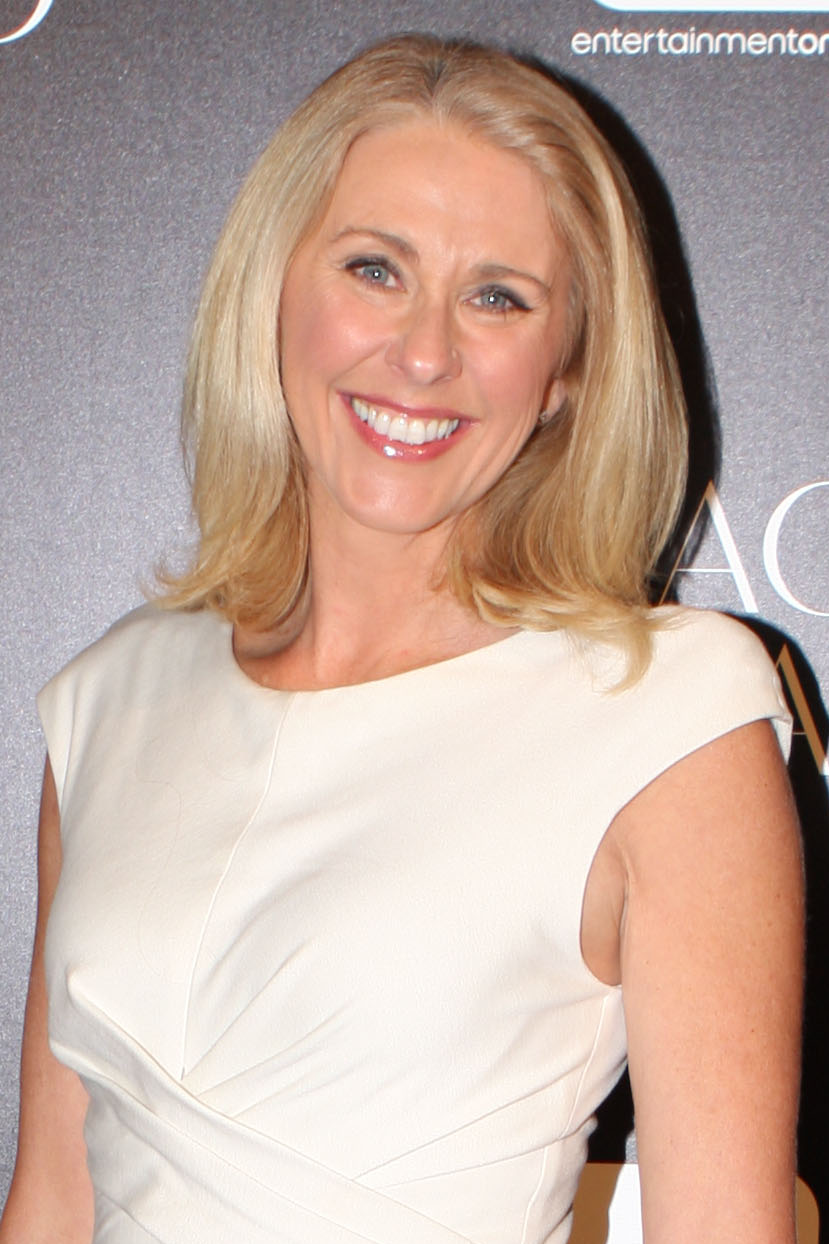
- Spicer at the Australian film premiere of Grace of Monaco, June 2014
- Born: Brisbane, Queensland, Australia
- Occupation: Journalist
- Years active: 1990−present
- Spouse: Jason Thompson
- Children: 2
- Website: traceyspicer.com.au

Tracey Leigh Spicer AM is an Australian journalist, author, public speaker and social justice advocate. She is known for her association with Network Ten as a newsreader in the 1990s and 2000s when she co-hosted Ten Eyewitness News in Brisbane, Queensland and later nationally, from the Sydney headquarters. She went on to work with Sky News Australia as a presenter from 2007 to 2015. In May 2017 Spicer released her autobiography, The Good Girl Stripped Bare, followed by her second book in May 2023, Man-Made: How the bias of the past is being built into the future, which examines how societal bias becomes embedded in artificial intelligence systems. Man-Made won the Social Responsibility category at the 2023 Australian Business Book Awards. It was also longlisted for the 2023 Walkley Book Award. She has won two Walkley Awardy for journalism and was appointed a Member of the Order of Australia, for significant service to the broadcast media as a journalist and television presenter, and as an ambassador for social welfare and charitable groups". Spicer is a regular public speaker, addressing a broad range of topics including artificial intelligence ethics, gender equality and media training.

== Early life and education ==
Spicer was born in Brisbane.

From 1980 to 1984, Spicer attended the private Soubirous and Frawley colleges in bayside Scarborough, 30 km (19 mi) north of Brisbane. In 1987, Spicer graduated from the Queensland Institute of Technology with a Bachelor of Business (communications) with a major in journalism.

== Career ==
Spicer began her career at Macquarie National News providing reports to the Brisbane station 4BH, before moving to Melbourne radio station 3AW as morning news editor. Spicer moved on to television: first for the rural network, Southern Cross Television, and the Nine Network. The Network Ten station in Melbourne later hired Spicer as a local correspondent and then co-host of the First at Five News in Brisbane (with Glenn Taylor). In 1995 she moved to Sydney to present the National Weekend News bulletins, and late night news until it was taken off air in 2005. Spicer remained with Network Ten until the end of 2006.

In late 2006, after 14 years with the network, Spicer was dismissed after returning from maternity leave when her second child was two months old. In a 10-page letter of demand served to Network Ten, Spicer claimed she had been discriminated against since giving birth to her first child in 2004. The case garnered attention in the media, with speculation she was fired because of her age; Network Ten strongly denied allegations of discrimination and said it was related to ongoing restructuring of the news division and related cost efficiencies. Spicer threatened to take the case to the Federal Court, but eventually settled with the network. She signed off for the final time on New Year's Eve 2006, beginning work with Sky News Australia four days later. Spicer worked as a Sky News presenter until leaving in 2015.

Spicer has hosted the Ethnic Business Awards, which is a national business award that highlights and celebrates migrant and Indigenous excellence in business, for 18 years in a row (2008–2026).

Spicer spent almost a decade writing the "Mama Holiday: column for Traveller in the Sunday Morning Herald and Age newspapers. Spicer was previously a weekly op-ed columnist with Wendy Harmer's The Hoopla from 2011 to 2015, and travel writer and ambassador for Holiday with Kids Magazine from 2009 to 2014. She was a regular columnist with the Daily Telegraph newspaper.

Since August 2015, Spicer has been an occasional host of ABC TV's The Drum and currently works as a freelance keynote speaker, emcee, writer, and media and presentation trainer through her company, Spicer Communications. Her keynote and workshop presentations address artificial intelligence ethics and bias, and gender diversity.

Spicer presented and produced documentaries for the World Wildlife Fund, World Vision, ActionAid and other non-government organisations about the plight of women and girls in Bangladesh, Kenya, Uganda, Papua New Guinea, and India.

In 2019, she was accused of breaching the privacy of #MeToo victims by failing to redact the names and identities of victims who had come forward during the filming of her #MeToo TV series Silent No More. The controversy further intensified when Spicer's lawyer sent defamation warning letters to those who spoke out online about these privacy breach concerns.

Spicer's second non-fiction book, Man-Made: How the bias of the past is being built into the future was published by Simon & Schuster in May 2023. The book, which examines how societal bias becomes embedded in artificial intelligence systems, from facial recognition to hiring algorithms was longlisted for that year's Walkley Book Award and won the Social Responsibility category at the 2023 Australian Business Book Awards.

== Advocacy and views ==
Spicer is an ambassador for World Vision, the World Wide Fund for Nature (WWF), the Queensland University of Technology's Learning Potential Fund and the Penguin Foundation, and Patron of the NSW Cancer Council, the newborn care unit at the Royal Hospital for Women, the Life's Little Treasures Foundation and the National Premmie Foundation.

She is also an Ambassador for Dying with Dignity, and is the face of the Garvan Institute of Medical Research's research into pancreatic cancer, the disease responsible for her mother's death.

In January 2011, Spicer interviewed anti-vaccination campaigner Meryl Dorey (Australian Vaccination Network now Australian Vaccination-Skeptics Network) on 2UE. Citing an editorial in the British Medical Journal which confirmed there was now 'clear evidence' that the now discredited research linking autism with the MMR vaccine, undertaken by Andrew Wakefield, was conducted unethically and based on falsified data, Spicer asked Dorey to concede the AVN's "scare campaign" was based on "fraudulent and misleading information". When Dorey tried to direct listeners to her AVN website, Spicer ended the interview prematurely by terminating the call. And in December 2011, in an article for the Daily Telegraph, Spicer became a public advocate for childhood vaccination when she wrote of her frustration with the growing anti-vaccination lobby.

In a 2010 Daily Telegraph article, Spicer urged politicians to approve the use of medical marijuana.

In 2015, she became an ambassador for KidsMatter, an Australian mental health and wellbeing initiative focused on primary schools and early childhood. Spicer hosted KidsMatters's Starting School videos. In the same year, she was appointed as ambassador for Autism Spectrum Australia.

In October 2017 after the Harvey Weinstein sexual abuse allegations made news, Spicer announced that she was investigating powerful Australian men in the media.. She became a vocal #MeToo campaigner on Twitter and encouraged people involved in the Australian entertainment industry to share their stories of sexual harassment in the workplace.

"In the wake of the Weinstein scandal I put out a very small tweet saying I was investigating … people in the Australian media(...)I'd expected to get perhaps a handful, a couple of dozen women responding. To this day 470 people have come forward."

— Tracey Spicer, The 7.30 Report

The ABC's investigative unit joined Spicer and she created a co-production with Fairfax Media. "These organisations have the most robust resources to uncover the structures protecting the guilty and punishing the innocent." Spicer, Kate McClymont, Lorna Knowles and Alison Branley, won the 2018 Walkley Awards in the print/text journalism and Television/Video Current Affairs Short (less than 20 minutes) categories, for their investigation into Don Burke, who was the first to be exposed.

On Australia Day in 2018 she was appointed as a Member of the Order of Australia "for significant service to the broadcast media as a journalist and television presenter, and as an ambassador for social welfare and charitable groups". Spicer reflected, "While conditions have improved in the TV business since I initiated legal action against Network Ten, more subtle forms of pregnancy discrimination permeate many workplaces. So, while we have policies and procedures in place, there remains a rump of cultural resistance to the idea of "working mothers".

Together with Melinda Schneider, Spicer launched NOW Australia on 25 March 2018. NOW Australia was "a service to help those who've been sexually harassed, assaulted or intimidated at work". A month-long crowdfunding campaign was launched on the same day. NOW Australia enlisted thirty Australian celebrities including Tina Arena, Deborah Mailman, Abby Earl and Missy Higgins to act as ambassadors. Spicer left NOW Australia in 2018 or 2019, stating that she had done so due to vicarious trauma. NOW Australia closed in June 2020. It was criticised for not meeting its goals.

== Writing ==
On 1 May 2017, Spicer's autobiography, The Good Girl Stripped Bare, was published by ABC Books and HarperCollins. A second non-fiction book, Man-Made: How the Bias of the Past is Being Built into the Future, was published by Simon & Schuster in May 2023.

In 2016 Spicer contributed to the report "Mates over Merit", a study of gender differences in the Australian media. Spicer's contribution to the design, analysis and promotion of the WiM survey were recognised by the Walkley Foundation as one of three achievements supporting her nomination for the Walkley's Women's Leadership in Media award.

Spicer has contributed stories to the books Unbreakable by Jane Caro, Father Figures by Paul Connolly, and Bewitched and Bedevilled: Women Write the Gillard Years by Samantha Trenoweth.

== Public speaking ==
Tracey Spicer is a regular speaker and emcee at events on AI, gender equality and mental health.

Following the publication of Man-Made in 2023, she has spoken on artificial intelligence and bias, including as a panellist at SXSW Sydney in October 2023.

== Awards ==
Tracey has won or been nominated for the following awards:

- 2016: Named 2016 QUT Alumni Service Award Winner, in recognition of her advocacy for the QUT Learning Potential Fund, which provides scholarships to students whose financial circumstances might prevent them from pursuing higher education
- 26 January 2018: Member of the Order of Australia, "For significant service to the broadcast media as a journalist and television presenter, and as an ambassador for social welfare and charitable groups"
- October 2018: Winner in the social enterprise and not-for-profit category of the Australian Financial Review 100 Women of Influence awards
- 2018: Nomination, along with Lorna Knowles, Kate McClymont, Alison Branley and Joanne Puccini, Mid-Year Walkley Award in the Women's Leadership in Media division for their joint investigation of Don Burke
- 22 November 2018: Winner, Walkley Awards in the print/text journalism and television/video current affairs short (less than 20 minutes) categories, with Kate McClymont, Lorna Knowles and Alison Branley for their investigation into Don Burke
- 2019: New South Wales Woman of the Year in recognition of her "contribution across NSW to industry, communities and society"
- 2019: Sydney Peace Prize awarded to the #MeToo movement, accepted by Spicer and Tarana Burke on 14 November 2019

== Personal life ==
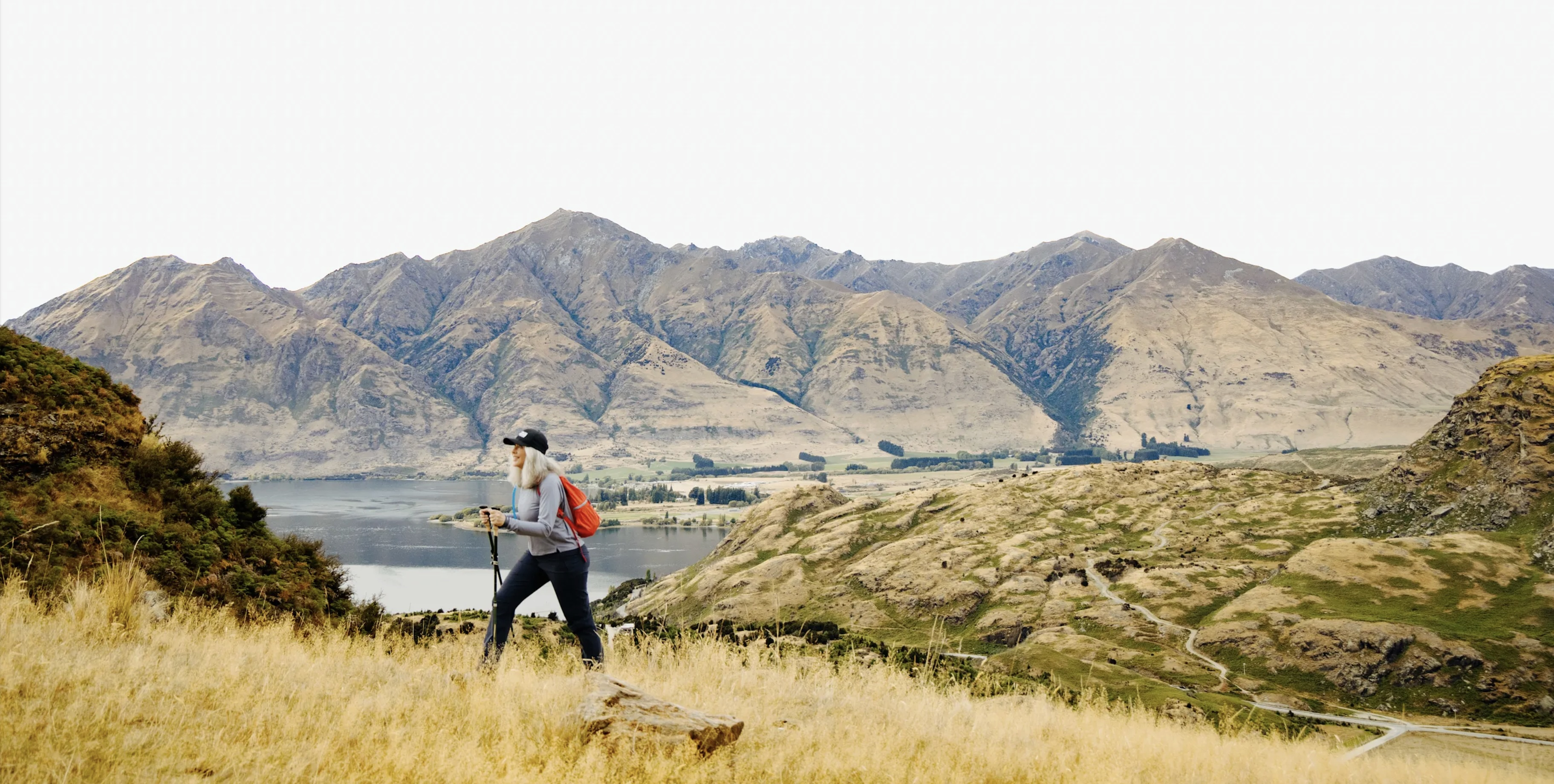
Spicer hiking, Diamond Lake and Rocky Mountain, Wānaka

In late June 2022 Spicer said in an interview that after contracting COVID-19 in January, and subsequently developing long COVID, she had had to reduce her working hours. In an article for Life & Leisure Spicer recounts trekking in New Zealand's Southern Alps in 2025 with a group of women raising funds for UN Women a United Nations agency working to empower women.
