= Peter Ridd =

Australian scientist and author

- Education: James Cook University
- Scientific career
- Thesis: The input impedance of horizontal linear antennas above a layered ground plane (1988)

Peter Vincent Ridd is an Australian physicist, author, and former professor at James Cook University (JCU), North Queensland, Australia.

Ridd is known for a lengthy legal battle with his former employer JCU, which has been variously characterised as a battle for academic freedom and as a media campaign seeking to discredit the science informing the protection of the Great Barrier Reef.

== Education ==
Ridd received a Bachelor of Science degree in Physics from James Cook University in 1978, and later a PhD in Physics from that same institution in 1980. At this time, he also joined the Australian Institute of Marine Science. He started studying the Great Barrier Reef in 1984, mainly focusing on ocean currents and the movement of sediment.

== Career ==
While teaching at JCU, Ridd was the head of the Physics department from 2009 to 2016, and head of the Marine Geophysical Laboratory at that institution for 15 years.

=== Great Barrier Reef article ===
With Piers Larcombe, Ridd wrote an opinion piece in November 2017, published in the January 2018 issue of Marine Pollution Bulletin, challenging the prevailing understanding of the state of the Great Barrier Reef, drawing attention to what he argued was a reproducibility crisis and certain specific papers relating to the state of the Great Barrier Reef, and recommending a new review body for policy science. A viewpoint article in rebuttal was printed in the April 2018 issue of the same journal by Schaffelke et al. Ridd replied in a further article in the June 2019 issue.

=== Dismissal from JCU ===
Beginning in April 2016, James Cook University took a number of disciplinary measures over two years against Ridd, which culminated in Ridd being fired, for refusing to take down confidential information which he had placed publicly online. The university denied that the dismissal was over Ridd's views on climate change. Ridd filed two crowdfunded lawsuits, the second over the dismissal.

On 16 April 2019, Ridd initially won the lawsuit, with James Cook University found to be in violation of the Fair Work Act 2009; in September 2019, Ridd was awarded in excess of AU$1 million, together with AU$125,000 pecuniary penalty. While the two parties continue to disagree whether the case related to academic freedom, the ruling judge said the case was "purely and simply about the proper construction of a clause in an enterprise agreement", although he also stated James Cook University had "not understood the whole concept of intellectual freedom". In July 2020, JCU won an appeal against this judgement from the full bench of the Federal Court. Ridd appealed to the High Court of Australia, but that appeal was dismissed.

== See also ==
- Jennifer Marohasy
