= No. 1 Fighter Sector RAAF =

No. 1 Fighter Sector (1FS) was a Royal Australian Air Force (RAAF) unit formed at Bankstown, New South Wales on 25 February 1942.

The RAAF commandeered Capitol Theatre at Bankstown for use as an operations and plotting facility on 14 March 1942.

No. 1 Fighter Sector handed over operations to United States Army Air Corps (USAAC) on 10 April 1942. The operations shifted to a disused railway tunnel at St James railway station.

On 13 August 1942, the RAAF resumed operations of No. 1 Fighter Sector and on 7 September 1942 the unit moved back to Bankstown. No. 1 Fighter Sector was renamed No. 101 Fighter Sector (101FS) on 18 October 1943 and was further renamed No. 101 Fighter Control Unit (101FCU) on 7 March 1944.

Unit became Air Defence Headquarters Sydney (ADHQ) on 21 January 1945 and moved into a three storey semi-underground purpose built operations and plotting facility at Bankstown.

ADHQ was disbanded on 27 January 1947.

== Commanding officers ==
- Squadron Leader C.E. Woodman - 9 March 1942
- Squadron Leader G.K.K. Buscombe - 3 August 1942
- Squadron Leader H.A. Conaghan - 7 December 1942
- Wing Commander J.H. Wright - 10 May 1943
- Squadron Leader C.C. Loxton - 25 January 1944
- Squadron Leader A.H. Boyd - 21 April 1944
- Flight Lieutenant T.W. Livesey - 8 August 1944
- Flight Lieutenant J.G. Comans - 16 October 1944
- Wing Commander J.L. Darnton - 27 November 1944
- Wing Commander C.G.C. Olive - 5 January 1945
- Wing Commander S.W. Galton - 23 July 1945
- Wing Commander R. Kingsford-Smith DFC - 10 September 1945
- Flight Lieutenant G.B. Murtough DFC - 19 March 1946
- Squadron Leader B.L. Bracegirdle - 11 June 1946
