= St James railway station, Sydney =

Heritage-listed railway station in Sydney, New South Wales, Australia

St James
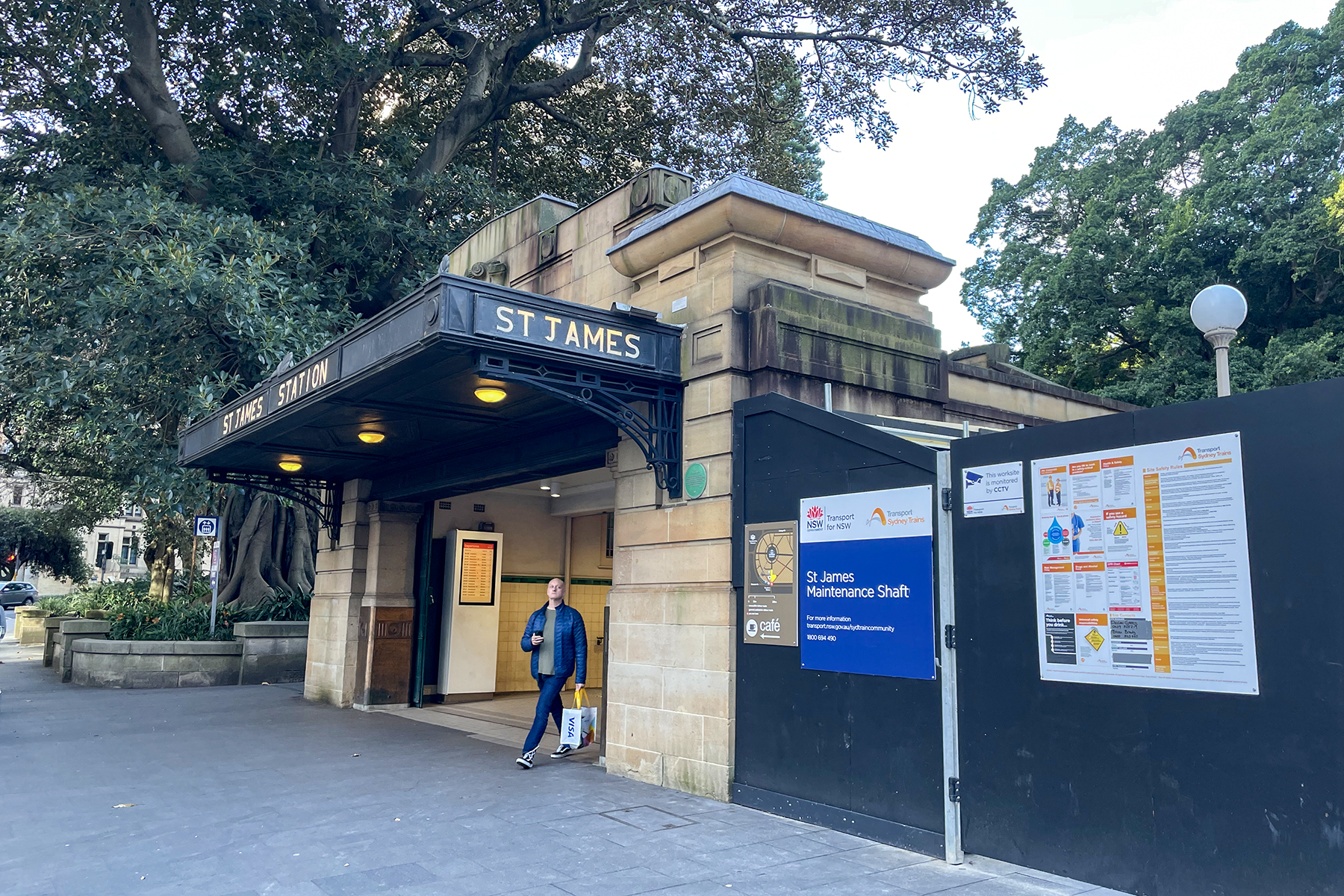
- Elizabeth Street building and entrance, July 2023

General information
- Location: Elizabeth Street, Sydney central business district, City of Sydney, New South Wales, Australia
- Coordinates: 33°52′13″S 151°12′43″E
- Owner: Transport Asset Manager of New South Wales
- Operator: Sydney Trains
- Line: City Circle
- Distance: 4.4 km (2.7 mi) from Central (clockwise)
- Platforms: 2 (1 island)
- Tracks: 2
- Connections: Bus

Construction
- Structure type: Underground
- Accessible: Yes
- Architect: George McRae (architect); John Bradfield (designer)
- Architectural style: Inter-War Stripped Classical

Other information
- Status: Staffed
- Station code: STJ
- Website: Transport for NSW

History
- Opened: 20 December 1926

Passengers
- 2025: 4,150,649 (year); 11,372 (daily) (Sydney Trains)
- Rank: 43

Services
Preceding station	Sydney Trains	Following station
Circular Quay towards Parramatta or Leppington	T2 Leppington & Inner West Line	Museum as the Airport & South Line towards Macarthur
Circular Quay towards Liverpool	T3 Liverpool & Inner West Line clockwise only	Museum towards City Circle
Circular Quay as the Inner West & Leppington Line towards Parramatta or Leppington	T8 Airport & South Line	Museum towards Macarthur

New South Wales Heritage Register
- Official name: St. James Railway Station group; St James Railway Station
- Type: State heritage (complex / group)
- Designated: 2 April 1999
- Reference no.: 1248
- Type: Railway Platform / Station
- Category: Transport – Rail
- Builders: Department of Railways
Route map
- City Circle route map
Location

St James railway station is a heritage-listed underground commuter rail station that is located on the City Circle, at the northern end of Hyde Park in the Sydney central business district of New South Wales, Australia. It is served by Sydney Trains' T2 Leppington & Inner West Line, T3 Liverpool & Inner West Line and T8 Airport & South Line services. It is named after the nearby St James' Church. It was added to the New South Wales State Heritage Register on 2 April 1999.

== History ==
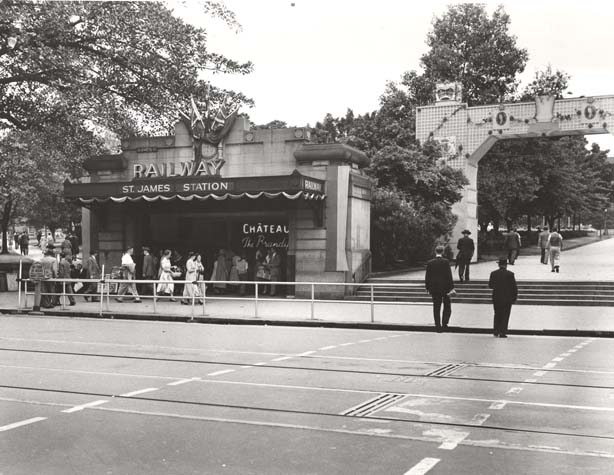
Facade of the station's main above-ground entrance on Elizabeth Street in 1954

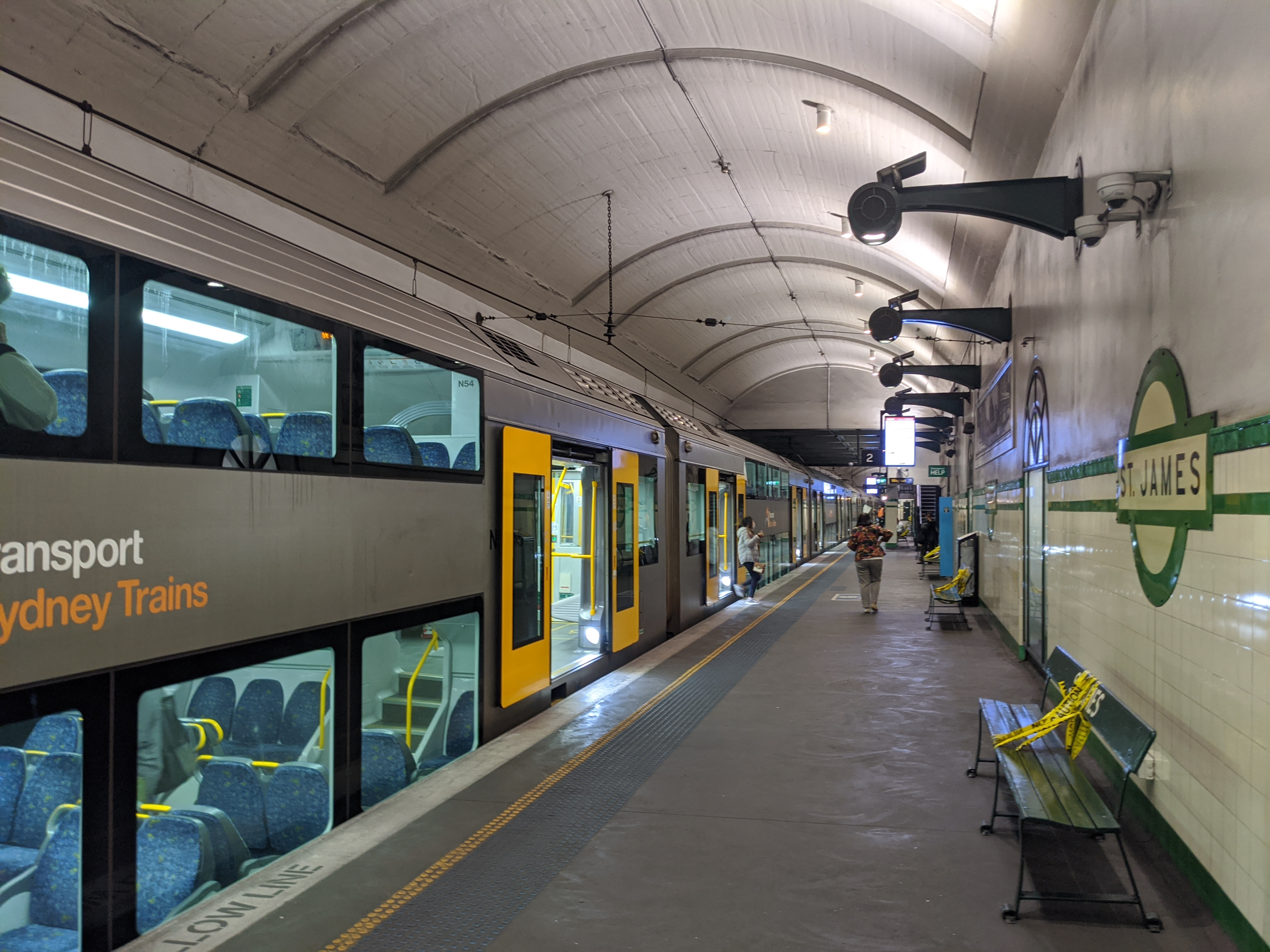
Platform 2

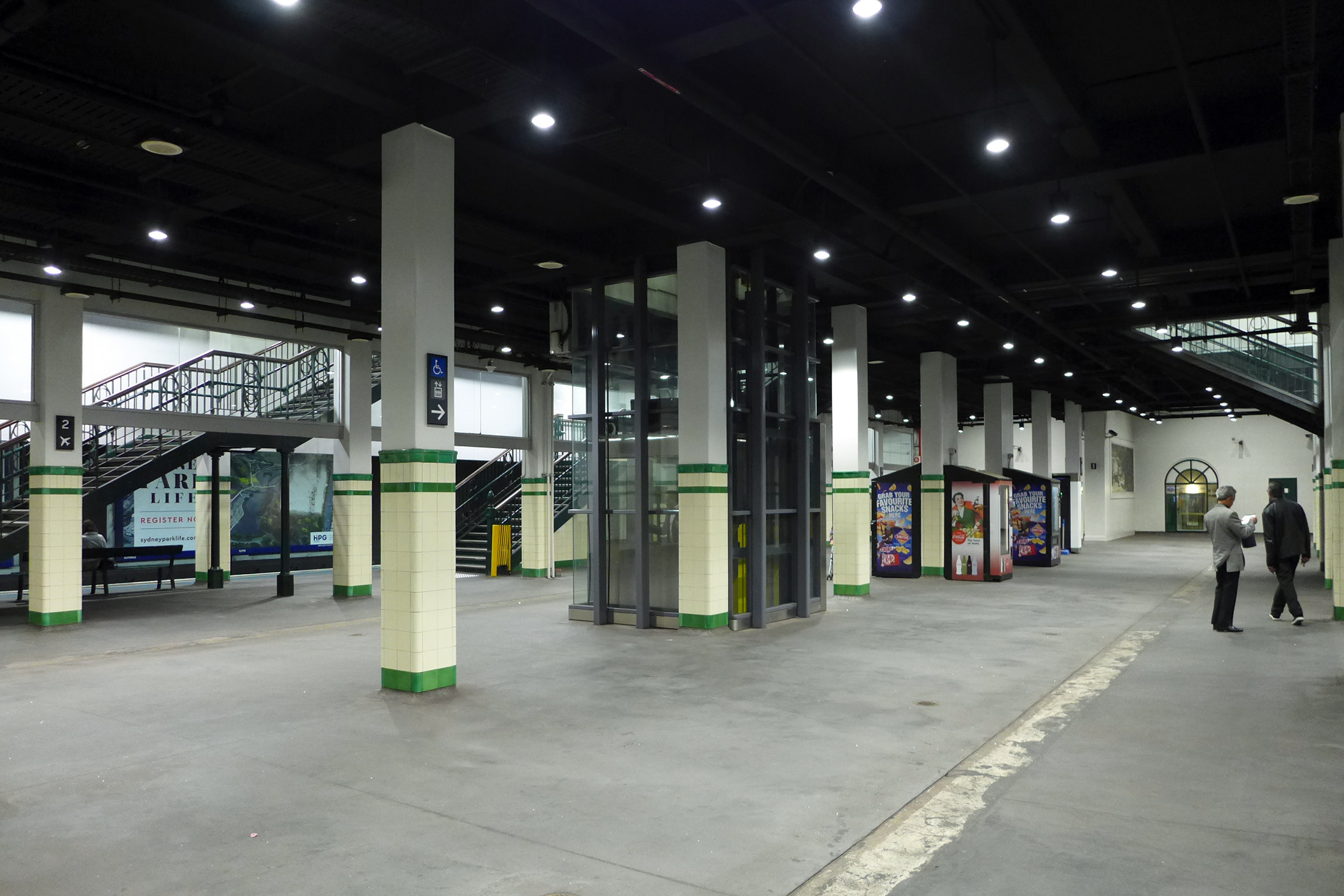
Centre of the large island platform. The columns in the middle of the photograph originally stood in the middle of the space between the two inner platforms where the tracks for those platforms would have been laid (they never were). The edge of one of the original island platforms is visible towards the right of the photograph. The walls at the far end are of recent construction: doors give access to the disused sections of the central platforms and rail tunnels.

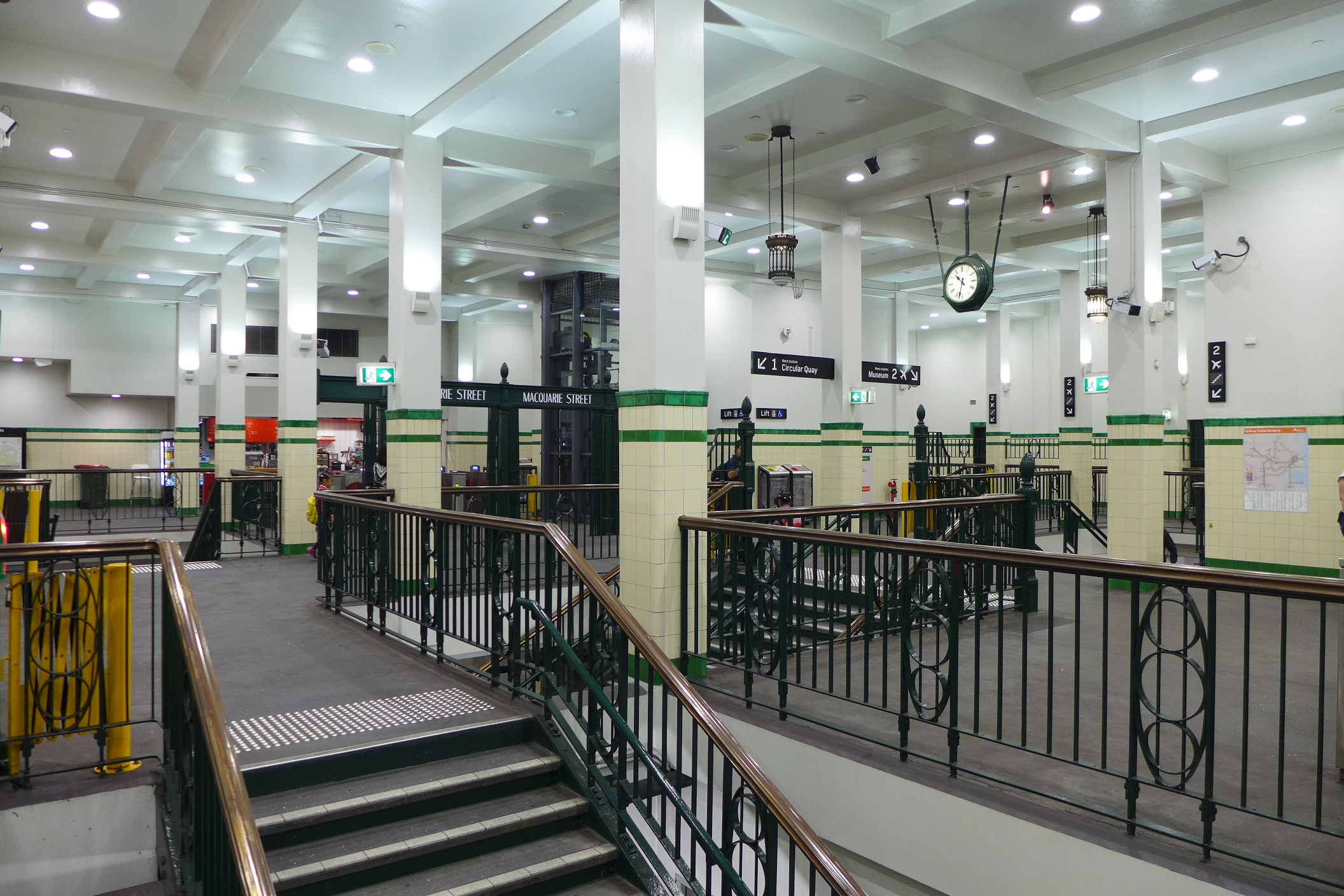
Concourse

Part of the Bradfield Plan, St James railway station was originally intended to be a major interchange with the Eastern Suburbs line on Sydney's underground rail system. Plans for the construction of St James included railway lines in four directions, but the original plan was never completed due to disagreements over the routes. Four platforms were completed, but the two inner platforms, intended to support Bradfield's proposed eastern and western suburbs lines, were never put into service. When the Eastern Suburbs line was eventually built it was done so via a different route via Town Hall. In the 1990s, the two island platforms were connected by filling in the space between the two inner platforms, resulting in the single, large island platform seen today.

The station was designed by NSW Government Architect, George McRae, but not completed until after his death. It is an example of Inter-War Stripped Classical architecture influenced by Art Deco. One distinctive feature of the station is a neon sign from the late 1930s advertising Chateau Tanunda Brandy installed by Tucker, Lingard & Co. It is located at the northern entrance on Elizabeth Street. It is a companion to Museum station, both opened at the same time and use a roundel design on their station signage that is similar to the one used on the London Underground.

St James station opened on 20 December 1926 with the opening of the eastern city line from Central. For the first 30 years, St James station was used as a terminating station for the East Hills and Illawarra lines. As a terminating station, St James was equipped with a small signal box and two dead end sidings, located in the tunnel stub at the north end of the station. The St James signal box, equipped with pistol grips, was the smallest such box in New South Wales. Trains arriving at St James would disembark passengers on one of the outer platforms, then the train would move to a siding and reverse direction, coming out at the opposite outer platform. During non-peak hours the driver would simply move to the other end of the train while the train was on the siding. During peak hours the train would take on a second driver in the last car while at the platform, then proceed to one of the sidings, where the drivers would exchange control of the train.

Completion of the City Circle loop did not occur until 30 years after St James station opened. Construction of the western city line as far as Wynyard was completed in 1932, but completion of the line connecting Wynyard and St James via Circular Quay, begun in 1936, proved problematic. Construction was halted during World War II and was intermittent after it resumed in 1945 due to inconsistent funding. The above-ground viaduct and Circular Quay railway station were finally completed in 1956, allowing trains to make a single circuit through the city and return to the suburbs without having to terminate.

As a result of this, St James's terminating facilities were no longer regularly used. The signal box remained in use until 1990 with the occasional train continuing to terminate at St James to keep the siding tracks usable for emergencies and railway staff familiar with the procedures. In 1985–86, the signal box was taken out of service for an asbestos abatement project. During this period, train cars allocated for the removal of the asbestos would occupy one or the other of the dead end sidings, which meant that regular use of those lines by passenger trains was not possible. After the asbestos abatement project was completed, the signal box was returned to service until 1990, when asbestos was discovered in the signal box and the sidings. From that time the signal box was not used, and the signals and siding tracks were eventually removed. The sidings were formally closed on 27 July 1991.

In February 2010, a passenger lift between the platform and the concourse opened, followed later by a lift between the concourse and street level.

== Tunnels ==
St James station is notable for the abandoned tunnels connected to the station. The Australian Railway Historical Society, with the approval of the State Rail Authority, has given tours of the tunnels, but many people have visited the tunnels by entering along the subway tracks. The tunnels were constructed as stubs for the planned eastern and western suburbs lines when the station was built in the 1920s. This was to ensure that the operation of St James would not be disrupted if future work was carried out on the lines. The abandoned tunnels extend some distance in either direction from St James. To the north is a double-track tunnel which proceeds for some 250 metres under Macquarie Street to be roughly parallel with the State Library; to the south two single-track tunnels extend to Whitlam Square at the intersection of Liverpool and College Streets.

=== Use as a mushroom farm ===
From 1933 to 1934, the City Inner tunnel between St James and Circular Quay was used by Raymond Mas as the location for an experimental mushroom farm producing 4,500 kilograms (10,000 lb) of mushrooms per month.

=== Use during World War II ===
The southern tunnels were modified during World War II to serve as a public air raid shelter. The abandoned air raid shelter begins in the single track section of the southern end of the station and continues into the two single track tunnels beyond. At the station end the air raid shelter is protected by a blast curtain and the doorways and openings for ventilation between the chambers, each about 30 metres long, are protected by blast curtains.

The tunnels were also used during World War II as an operations bunker by the No. 1 Fighter Sector RAAF. The bunker was located in what was intended to be the City Inner Tunnel, access to which was provided by a wooden staircase in a shaft leading upward to Shakespeare Place. Women's Auxiliary Australian Air Force (WAAAF) personnel housed in this operations bunker collected information from radar and weather stations, as well as reports on air traffic, ship and troop movements collected from airports, army and Volunteer Air Observer Corps reporting posts. This section of tunnel was constructed using a cut and cover technique outside St James station, and connects to the tunnels in St James through pilot tunnels, accessible via ladder.

As air quality in the tunnel was poor, WAAAF shifts were limited to six hours. Eventually the health of the WAAAF personnel declined due to poor air quality or poor food, so operations were relocated first to The Capital Theatre in Bankstown, and subsequently to the Bankstown Bunker on Black Charlies Hill near Condell Park.

The staircase used to access the bunker was destroyed by fire on 16 November 1968. Smoke from this fire interrupted train service for approximately twelve hours.

=== Underground lake ===
The end of the northern tunnel flooded and produced an underground lake, 10 metres (33 ft) wide, 5 metres (16 ft) deep, and 1 kilometre (3,300 ft) long. Known as St James Lake, it is off limits to the public. In recent years, due to drought and diminishing water supplies in underground aquifers, there have been a number of proposals for how to use the abandoned tunnels and other underground spaces for storage and recycling of water.

In the mid-2000s, Ian Kiernan proposed that an abandoned water tunnel, Busby's Bore, be redirected to St James Lake where water could be stored and recycled. Busby's Bore was originally used to carry water from nearby swamps to the Hyde Park area, but was abandoned for that purpose in the 1890s after becoming contaminated by sewage. In 2004 the idea of recycling the water from the bore received support from the executive director of the Botanical Gardens Trust, Tim Entwisle.

During 2006, it was proposed that the northern unused tunnels be used as a reservoir for irrigation water for The Domain and the Royal Botanic Garden as part of a Clean Up Australia project to create a series of water reclamation and storage facilities. Clean Up Australia partnered with a number of groups in the attempt to move the project forward, and in 2007 obtained funding to proceed. Also in 2007, State Premier Morris Iemma announced plans to harvest rainwater at Parliament House. According to this plan all storm water from Parliament House, the State Library and Sydney Hospital (all on Macquarie Street) would be drained into the tunnels, treated, and then pumped back to storage tanks at the surface for use in non-potable water systems, saving an estimated 17 megalitres (3.7×10^{6} imp gal; 4.5×10^{6} US gal) each year.

In January 2008, the Minister for Transport John Watkins said he intended to ask RailCorp to begin a study to determine if the underground network of tunnels could be used for water storage. The project began on 15 January 2008 when water tanks for storage of the recycled water were installed on the top of Parliament House.

=== In popular culture ===
The tunnels which had been prepared as an air raid shelter were also used by ABC TV as a location for one episode of the TV series Police Rescue in the early 1990s. In the episode, a boy who had fallen down a storm drain is rescued.

There is also a large bell in one of the tunnels. According to one source, the ABC used this bell to simulate the sound of Big Ben for use in a TV series during the 1960s, but that information has not been verified. Another source suggests that the bell was installed by Nigel Helyer in 1992 as a work of art. The piece, titled "An UnRequited Place", was part of the Working in Public project created by ArtSpace Sydney, and was a combination of the physical sculpture, performance and audio broadcast. For 21 days the sound of the bell tolling at midnight was broadcast by the ABC.

The platforms were used as a shooting location in 2003 film The Matrix Revolutions.

In 2008, the station was used as a location for the mini-series False Witness. The platforms featured in Zoë Badwi's 2010 music video Freefallin. In 2011, The Tunnel was filmed in the abandoned tunnels.

=== 2018 proposal ===
In September 2018, expressions of interest were being sought to use the tunnels as the next underground attraction in Sydney.

== Platforms and services ==
Platform	Line	Stopping pattern	Notes
1	T2 Leppington & Inner West Line	services to Homebush, Parramatta, Leppington	
1	T3 Liverpool & Inner West Line	services to Liverpool via Lidcombe and Regents Park	
2	T8 Airport & South Line	services to Sydenham services to Revesby & Macarthur via Airport stations 2 weekday evening services to Campbelltown	

== Heritage listing ==
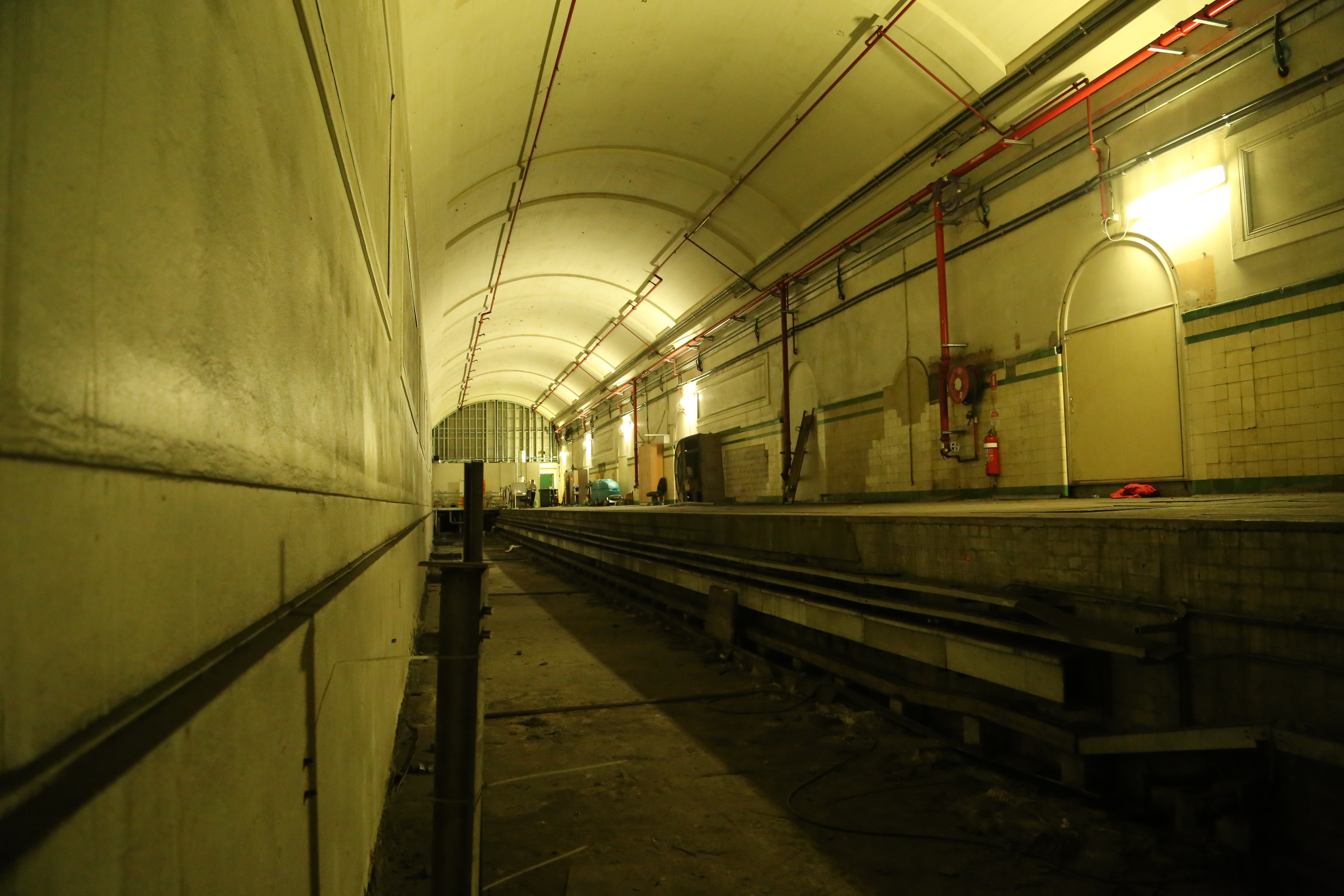
One of the disused platforms. When the station was first constructed, the public could access these platforms but they have since been walled off from the rest of the station.

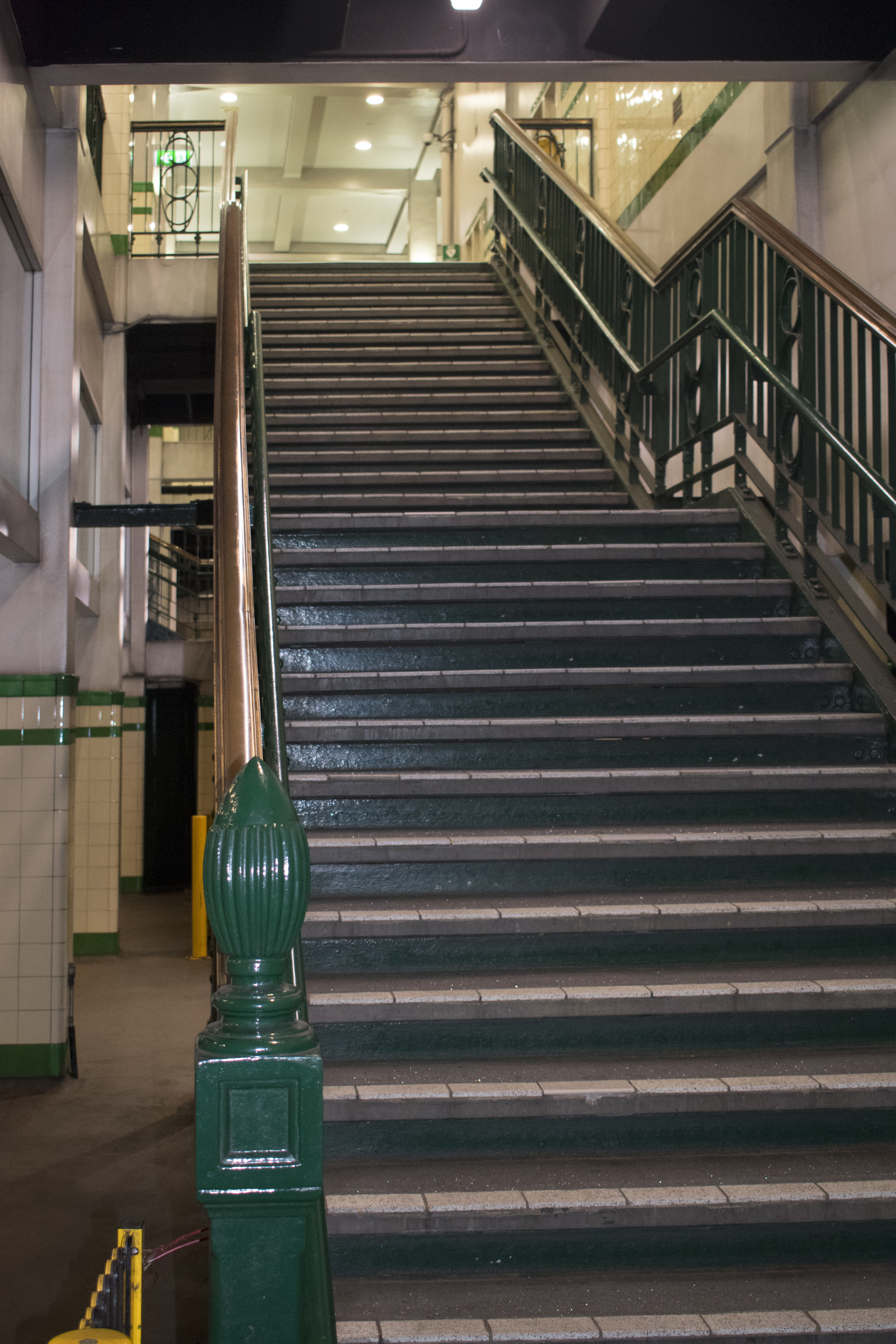
The staircase to the exit

St James station was listed on the New South Wales State Heritage Register on 2 April 1999. The station is of State significance because, along with Museum, it was the first underground station in Australia and demonstrates the adaptation of the London tube-style station to the Australian situation. The station is well constructed, proportioned and detailed. The station complex is an important part of the larger Sydney Harbour Bridge and the electrified City Underground Railway scheme and has associations with prominent persons such as JJC Bradfield, chief engineer and designer of the Sydney Harbour Bridge and city underground and organisations such as the Department of Railways and represents the culmination of many years of political lobbying for a city railway system. The construction of the city underground and position of St James station encouraged the retail and commercial development of the Sydney CBD in the late 1920s and 1930s, with large department stores constructed around the stations.

The station head house building is a fine and largely intact example of a small-scale Inter-War Stripped Classical style building which adds to the general character of the immediate area. It has significance as one of two buildings of its type and style remaining in the city railway system (the other being Museum Station entrance) and is a rare example of this type of station building.

The underground platforms and concourse retain many original features and provide one of the most ornate station interiors in the NSW railway system. Disused platforms demonstrate the grand plans of the 1930s railway network of Bradfield, while the air raid shelter areas in the southern tunnels are rare surviving elements of Sydney's World War II defences.

Individual elements, such as the tiling, ornate stairs, lights and clocks add to the ambience of the station, while the Chateau Tanunda neon advertising sign at the Elizabeth Street entrance is a rare surviving example of a 1930s neon sign in Sydney.

== Maps ==
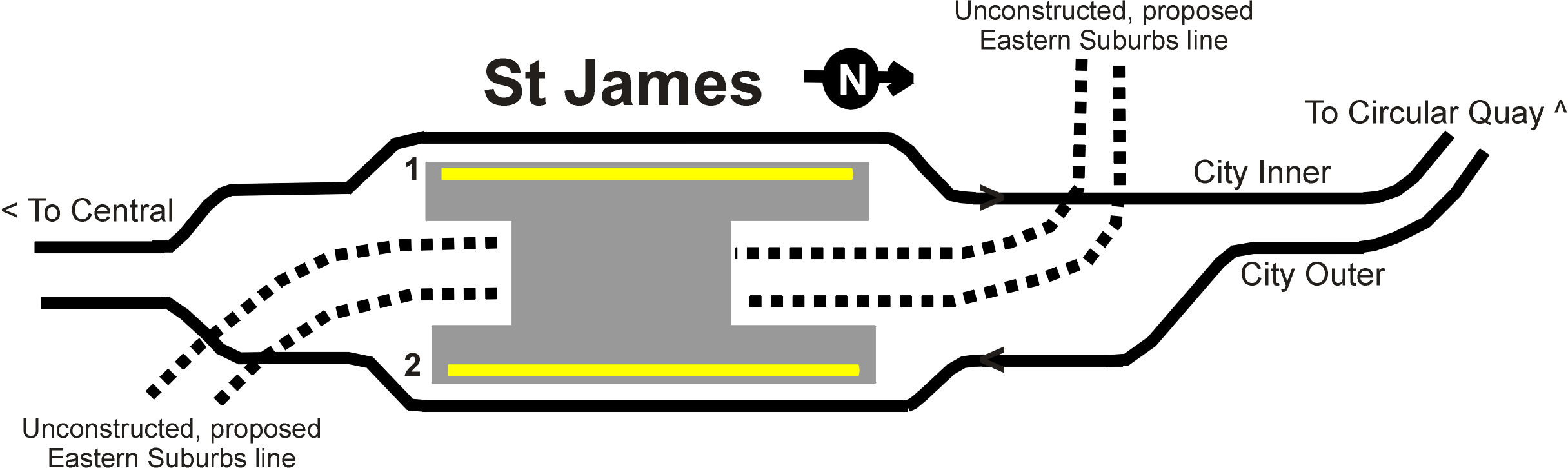
Track layout

== See also ==
- Architecture of Sydney
- List of Sydney Trains railway stations
- Railways in Sydney
- Rail transport in New South Wales
