= Don Burke =

Australian television presenter, author, and horticulturist (born 1947)

Don Burke OAM
- Born: Donald William Burke; 16 July 1947 (age 79); Sydney, New South Wales, Australia
- Occupations: Television presenter; producer; author; landscaper
- Years active: 1987–2013
- Known for: Burke's Backyard host
- Spouse: Marea Burke

Donald William Burke OAM (born 16 July 1947) is an Australian former television presenter, television producer, author and horticulturist. He is best known as the longtime host of Burke's Backyard, a lifestyle program produced by his wife's company CTC Productions, which ran for 17 years from 1987 to late 2004 on the Nine Network. He was also responsible for the creation of garden makeover program Backyard Blitz, starring former colleague Jamie Durie.

== Career ==
In 2004, Business Review Weekly listed Burke among its top 50 entertainers list, saying he earned an estimated A$7.2 million in 2004.

Burke is a professional horticulturist and has been active in a number of other public roles. Burke spent 20 years working on his own home and garden. He has been an outspoken critic of numerous environmental advocacy groups. From July 2005 to late 2008, Burke was the Chair of the climate-change-denying Australian Environment Foundation.

Burke was awarded the Medal of the Order of Australia (OAM) on 26 January 2010 for service to conservation and the environment through advisory roles, to the horticultural industry, and to the media as a television presenter.

Burke appeared on A Current Affair in July 2015, with his wife Marea, discussing her health battles including arteriovenous malformation (AVM) and breast cancer.

== Sexual misconduct allegations ==
An investigation started when journalist Tracey Spicer announced on Twitter that she was investigating the sexual harassment by powerful men in the Australian entertainment industry. Spicer said, "One name kept recurring – Don Burke". On 26 November 2017, the Australian Broadcasting Corporation and The Sydney Morning Herald published a joint investigative piece containing claims that Burke had sexually harassed, sexually assaulted, and bullied women throughout his television career. The report quotes alleged female victims, as well as both female and male witnesses, including David Leckie—the former head of the Nine Network, on which Burke's programs aired—comparing Burke to American producer Harvey Weinstein. Kate McClymont, Lorna Knowles, Tracey Spicer and Alison Branley received a Walkley Award for their investigation.

Other former Channel Nine executives went "on the record" to comment on the allegations.

Sam Chisholm said, "Don Burke was a disgrace because of his behaviour internally and externally. This precluded him from ever becoming a major star."

Peter Meakin said, "There was gossip about inappropriate language and he was incredibly demanding. If someone fell short of the mark, he would excoriate them. He was unforgiving."

In response to the allegations, Burke released a lengthy statement which said he was "deeply hurt and outraged at the false and defamatory claims" and suggested the "baseless" claims were from former employees who "bear grudges against me". Burke also stated that he has had a "life-long opposition to sexism and misogyny".

Burke claimed to have self-diagnosed Asperger's syndrome and, in a media interview following revelations about his alleged misconduct, said that these "genetic failings" were to blame for some of his conduct. In response, Autism Awareness Australia stated that Burke's claim was "beyond appalling" and "gobsmacking".

In the following days, many celebrities came forward to recount their observations of Burke's sexist and offensive behaviour, including Susie O'Neill, Kerri-Anne Kennerley, Di Morrissey, Debra Byrne, Tottie Goldsmith, Amity Dry and Mike Carlton.

Following the interview on A Current Affair, one of the women sued Burke for defamation on the grounds that he said she had lied about the sexual harassment allegation and that she made the false allegation as part of a "witch hunt" during the interview. She lost the case on the grounds that Justice David Mossop did not find Burke's denial in the interview was credible, so viewers would not conclude that she was a liar or part of a witch hunt, and thus was not defamed.
