= Glenn Taylor (television presenter) =

Australian presenter

- Occupations: former journalist and television presenter
- Years active: 1968 to 1998
- Known for: being sacked for saying "testicles"
- Television: Today Tonight, State Affair, Seven News, Ten News

Glenn Taylor is an Australian Logie Award-winning former television presenter.

He is best known for co-anchoring Seven News on HSV-7 in Melbourne from 1988 to 1991 and Ten News on TVQ-10 in Brisbane from 1992 to 1998.

== Career ==
Taylor commenced his media career at ABC Radio Adelaide in the late 1960's. He moved into television in the mid 1970's, appearing on the ABC's Adelaide television station ABS-2, presenting Today at One and reporting for This Day Tonight.

In 1979, he joined QTQ-9 in Brisbane where he hosted a local current affairs program called Today Tonight (unrelated to the Seven Network's Today Tonight of the same name which commenced in 1995).

In 1980, Taylor was "poached" by rival Brisbane station BTQ-7 to host their own local current affairs program called State Affair. Taylor defended the decision to leave QTQ to go to BTQ despite there being a 'no poaching' agreement amongst the Brisbane television stations.

When State Affair was axed in 1987, Taylor briefly moved to Channel 7's Perth station TVW-7 where he began anchoring the local edition of Seven News following the departure of Peter Waltham.

In late 1987, it was announced that Taylor had been appointed as a co-anchor for Seven's hour-long Melbourne news, alongside Jennifer Keyte.

He continued this role until 1991 when Seven decided to revert the hour-long bulletin back to 30 minutes with Keyte continuing on as sole anchor.

Taylor then returned to Brisbane where he commenced co-anchoring Ten News. Initially, he was paired with Marie-Louise Theile until she left in 1993 and then with Tracey Spicer from 1994 to 1996 before Theile returned in 1997.

Network Ten sacked Taylor from the role after an on-air incident in 1998. After Theile had introduced a story about swimmer Richard Upton (who had tested positive to a banned drug) being relieved he hadn't "been suspended", Taylor added "...by his testicles."

After the sacking, the network and Taylor reached an out of court settlement. He told Nine's local current affairs program Extra in September 1998: "I admit I made the remark but I didn't think it was blasphemous or profane, and I thought the penalty far outweighed the indiscretion on my part."

In 2000, Taylor accused the network of having double standards when they didn't sack Theile after she called her husband an "arsehole" whilst on air during a conversation with Taylor's successor Geoff Mullins when they thought station was still in a commercial break.

== Awards ==
Taylor won Logie Awards for Most Popular Male Personality (Queensland) in 1980, 1984 and 1986. QTQ-9's Today Tonight also won a Logie in March 1980 for Most Popular Show (Queensland) while Taylor was still host, prior to being poached by BTQ-7 in May 1980.

Media offices
Preceded by Des McWilliam	Ten News Queensland; Weeknight presenter with Marie-Louise Theile and Tracey Spicer; 1991–1998	Succeeded by Geoff Mullins
Preceded by David Johnston	Seven News Melbourne; Weeknight Presenter with Jennifer Keyte; 1988–1991	Succeeded by Jennifer Keyte
