= Burke's Backyard =

Australian radio and television gardening and lifestyle programme

- Final Burke's Backyard logo
- Genre: Lifestyle
- Created by: Don Burke
- Presented by: Don Burke
- Country of origin: Australia
- Original language: English
- No. of seasons: 18
- No. of episodes: 713

Production
- Executive producer: Don Burke
- Running time: 60 minutes (including commercials)

Original release
- Network: Nine Network
- Release: 12 September 1987 – 26 November 2004

Burke's Backyard was an Australian gardening and lifestyle series presented by horticulturist Don Burke, broadcast on both radio and television. On television, it was a regular weekly series on the Nine Network from 12 September 1987 to 26 November 2004.

== History ==
The program began on the Sydney AM radio station 2UE on Saturday and Sunday mornings before being picked up by the Nine Network in late 1987. Channel 9 broadcast the show on Friday evenings for the next 17 years. It is currently being broadcast on radio by 2UE and syndicated stations on Saturday and Sunday mornings. A magazine of the same name as the television program was published as a merchandising tie-in by Australian Consolidated Press. Don Burke went on to join Jamie Durie in creating the television show Backyard Blitz.

== Cast ==
The show was hosted by Don Burke but also included other presenters. The cooking segment was presented by Geoff Jansz, who also hosted the Channel Nine cooking shows What's Cooking and Fresh. Tara Dennis coordinated the fabrics and design section, while Rebecca Harris coordinated the pet section as she also did in her own Nine series Animal Hospital. Harris sometimes also appeared on the design and fabric segments. Scott Cam assisted Don as the building, gardening and design expert for more than half the program's duration. Other cast members included Ernie Dingo, Peter Harris, Dr. Chris Brown, Nigel Ruck, Jackie French, Elise Pascoe, Rita Hill, Dr. Harry Cooper, Reg Livermore and Rosemary Stanton.

For the 2007 television specials, Don Burke was assisted mainly by Scott Cam and Nigel Ruck. Former Olympic Gold Medalist swimmer Giaan Rooney also joined the cast for the specials, giving environmental tips, while financial expert Paul Clitheroe presented the financial section.

== Theme song ==
The theme to Burke's Backyard is a modified version of Bullamakanka's version of "Give Me a Home Among the Gumtrees" (Bob Brown; Walter Johnson Jr.). The chorus is as follows:

Give me a home among the gum trees, with lots of plum trees
A dog or two and a barbecue
flowers down the side
And veggies by the fence
all in Burke's Backyard

== Ratings ==
The television show was consistently a very strong ratings performer for the Nine Network. It occupied the Friday 7:30–8:30 timeslot for 17 years. During its final year, however, it rated poorly and was 'rested' by the Nine Network.

In the Spring special return in 2007, the show posted a very encouraging 10th place in the week's shows. It defeated both of its competing Seven Network shows including Australia's Best Backyards and Hot Property, and was the most watched Nine Network show of the week.

== See also ==
- Better Homes and Gardens
- List of Australian television series
- List of Nine Network programs
- List of longest-running Australian television series
