= Midday (Australian TV program) =

Australian daytime variety TV show

- Also known as: The Midday Show with Ray Martin (1985–1986); Midday with Ray Martin (1986–1992); Ray Martin at Midday (1993); Midday with Derryn Hinch (1994); Midday with Kerri-Anne (1996–1998)
- Genre: Variety
- Presented by: Ray Martin; Derryn Hinch; Tracy Grimshaw; David Reyne; Kerri-Anne Kennerley
- Narrated by: Ken Sparkes
- Country of origin: Australia
- Original language: English
- No. of seasons: 14

Production
- Production locations: Sydney, New South Wales
- Running time: 90 minutes

Original release
- Network: Nine Network
- Release: 11 February 1985 – 27 November 1998

Related
- The Mike Walsh Show; Kerri-Anne

Midday (commonly referred to as The Midday Show) is an Australian award-winning daytime television program, based on the variety format that aired on the Nine Network on 11 February 1985 until 27 November 1998. The show aired, like its title suggests, at noon, on a weekday schedule, and was a 90-minute variety program with international and local guests. It featured interviews, musical performances and comedy spots. The format of the show was similar to that of its predecessor, The Mike Walsh Show, which it replaced in the lunch time slot.

== Program history / hosts ==
=== Ray Martin (1985–1993) ===
Leading Mike Walsh's resignation from The Mike Walsh Show, Ray Martin was appointed as his successor in 1985, despite being known primarily as a journalist from 60 Minutes. The program was re-titled to The Midday Show with Ray Martin, which was later shortened to Midday with Ray Martin, and finally Ray Martin at Midday in 1993. Although Martin was seen as a shock choice at the time of his appointment, he soon became increasingly popular with viewers.

During his time on the show, a highly publicised on-air scuffle took place in 1991 between former pop idol Normie Rowe and radio personality Ron Casey.

While Martin was at the helm, members of the Midday on-camera team included musical director Geoff Harvey; comedians Graham Pugh, Ross Daniels, Ewan Campbell; trumpeter Bob Bouffler; and pre Big Brother presenter Gretel Killeen. Ray Martin remained as host until late 1993, when he was moved to replace Mike Willesee as host of A Current Affair, which had seen a ratings decline over the previous year.

Martin ended up being a popular host on the show. He won the Gold Logie for his role 3 times – in 1987, 1993 and 1994. He was nominated for the award in 1986, 1990, 1991 and 1992. Jean Stafford was a regular on Midday with Ray Martin from 1986 to 1993 with over 47 performances.

=== Derryn Hinch (1994) ===
Following Martin's departure to A Current Affair, Derryn Hinch was appointed as host shortly after being sacked from his self-titled current affairs program on the Ten Network. The show effectively reverted partially to its old title by becoming Midday With Derryn Hinch. Hinch's appointment was seen by many as a shock decision, as he had previously been known as a hard-hitting, outspoken personality. Many were therefore surprised to see him showing a softer side in his role as Midday host. Gradually-declining ratings over previous years saw the show axed at the end of 1994 (Hinch had offered to resign for the good of the show, but stated in interviews that Nine Network executives made it clear that it was the show that was being axed rather than the host).

=== Tracy Grimshaw and David Reyne (1995) ===
Following the announcement of the program's axing at the end of 1994, it had been stated that the show would be replaced by a new talk program. After a six-month absence, a lower-budget hour-long program using the Midday title began. In its new form, the show had a more generic feel to it, with no live band and none of the loose "variety show" feeling of the program in its previous incarnation. After the network had considered a number of personalities for the hosting job including Larry Emdur, Richard Wilkins and Monte Dwyer, it was announced that Tracy Grimshaw and David Reyne were to be the co-hosts of this version. However, only six months later the program was again reformatted, effectively making it more reminiscent of the Mike Walsh/Ray Martin eras.

=== Kerri-Anne Kennerley (1996–1998) ===
In 1996, Kerri-Anne Kennerley was appointed to the new incarnation of the show, with the title becoming Midday with Kerri-Anne. Geoff Harvey re-joined the show from a period of semi-retirement, albeit with a streamlined, six-piece band and not the full orchestra the show had had in previous days. Initially, Kerri-Anne caused a resurgence in ratings, with her enthusiasm and her tendency to physically interact with guests (i.e. doing dance steps with dancers, attempting to play the respective sports of sporting personalities) rather than confining herself to sit-down interviews. She gained three consecutive Gold Logie nominations for her work on the show, and was widely praised for "bringing the magic back to Midday". However, the show was eventually not able to compete with better rating, imported programs on other networks, and the general decline of locally produced daytime talk shows and budget concerns that prompted the 1994 axing caused the show to again be axed at the end of 1998.

The final Midday program aired on 27 November 1998, running for a length of 150 minutes and featuring an array of guests including Maggie Tabberer, Brian Bury, Doug Mulray, Derryn Hinch, Don Lane, Ron Casey, Barry Crocker and Dame Edna. Producers included Kerry Roberts, Anne Haebich and Kelley Shepherd.

=== Guest hosts ===
The program would occasionally use guest presenters, usually personalities from other Nine Network programs, who would fill in for the regular hosts of the show.

A notable guest host in 1985 was John Howard who filled in for Ray Martin on 30 August 1985. Howard, who was deputy opposition leader at the time, was the network's second choice after initially approaching opposition leader and Liberal Party leader Andrew Peacock who declined the invitation to host the show. Howard is believed to have chosen his own guests which included political journalists Richard Carleton and Laurie Oakes, cricketer Bill O'Reilly and actress Carmen Duncan.

Within a week of Howard hosting Midday, Peacock unsuccessfully attempted to replace Howard as deputy opposition leader with John Moore which led to the 1985 Liberal Party of Australia leadership spill which ultimately saw Howard replace Peacock as Liberal Party leader.

== Awards ==
The show and hosts have won several Logie awards, and been nominated for several too.

Gold Logie:

- Won: 3 times – Ray Martin (1987, 1993, 1994)
- Nominated: 7 times – Ray Martin (1986, 1990–1992); Kerri-Anne Kennerley (1997–1999)

Midday and its predecessor The Mike Walsh Show won a combined total of 24 Logie Awards for the Nine Network.

== Post-Midday and legacy ==
Following the program's demise in November 1998, the following year, Kerri-Anne was appointed to co-host the cooking show What's Cooking, alternating host Geoff Jansz's cooking segments with her interviews which were not related to cooking. This was seen as an awkward change to the show, which was axed at the end of that year, causing Kerri-Anne to leave the network, openly criticising the format that What's Cooking was given. After spending some time in other media and a second stint at Network Ten, Kerri-Anne returned to Nine to host Mornings with Kerri-Anne (later shortened to Kerri-Anne), a morning talk show with some similarities to Midday, but without a live audience (except on an occasional basis) and with heavy infomercial content. Kerri-Anne was eventually replaced with a new incarnation of Mornings (now Today Extra) presented by David Campbell and Sonia Kruger in 2012. Kruger later resigned from the program and the network at the end of 2019, with former Today news presenter Sylvia Jeffreys announced as her replacement.

Midday and various memorable events associated with the program continue to be regularly recalled in the Australian media, including an incident when an entertainer appeared to juggle chainsaws and live kittens which prompted complaints.

Another Midday incident often referred to occurred in 1996 when host Kerri-Anne Kennerley, following a serious political discussion, coaxed Federal Treasurer Peter Costello into learning the Macarena.

In 2020, media personality Lisa Wilkinson recalled a tense exchange she had with Nine boss Kerry Packer after being a guest on Midday in her capacity as the editor of Cleo, also owned by Packer. During her appearance on Midday, Wilkinson had revealed she had decided to discontinue the nude centrefold but had done so without consulting Packer which prompted him to immediately phone her to discuss the matter.

In 2019, there were unsubstantiated reports the Seven Network was considering relaunching their own version of Midday. Also that same year, the Nine Network launched Australia's Top 10 Of Everything, a show featuring a look at all things nostagia including clips of interviews and segments from past and present flagship Nine programs including clips from Midday. Since the programs inception in 2019, it has been rerun numerous times.

Ongoing tension between Midday hosts Derryn Hinch and Kerri-Anne Kennerley has also kept attention on the program.

In 2020, there was reported speculation that the Nine Network was considering relaunching the Midday show in the near future with Kerri-Anne Kennerley and Samantha Armytage touted as potential hosts.
