= Weekend Today (Australian TV program) =

Australian breakfast TV program

- Genre: Breakfast news program
- Presented by: Dan Anstey; Alison Piotrowski; Lizzie Pearl
- Country of origin: Australia
- Original language: English
- No. of seasons: 17
- No. of episodes: 526

Production
- Executive producer: Michael Kersnovske
- Production location: North Sydney, New South Wales
- Running time: 180 minutes

Original release
- Network: Nine Network
- Release: 1 February 2009 – present

Related
- Today; Today Extra

Weekend Today is an Australian breakfast television program, hosted by Dan Anstey and Alison Piotrowski.

It has been broadcast live by the Nine Network since 2009 and airs after children's programming and runs from 7am to 10am on weekends. The show is broadcast from the Nine Network studios in North Sydney, a suburb located on the North Shore of Sydney, New South Wales.

== History ==
In January 2009, David Gyngell, chief executive of the Nine Network and John Westacott, former head of news and current affairs announced that Today would begin broadcasting on Sunday mornings. The program entitled, Today on Sunday, competes in the same timeslot as the Seven Network's Weekend Sunrise, which dominates Sunday morning television nationally, except on the east coast. The show launched on 1 February 2009 and the original team consisted of Cameron Williams and Leila McKinnon with the news presented by Amber Sherlock and the sport was presented by Tim Gilbert on Saturday and Michael Slater on Sunday.

On 2 May 2009, after the launch of Today on Sunday, the Nine Network announced through a surprise edition that Today on Saturday would return. The program incorporates the same presenting team as the Sunday edition, being the first Australian breakfast news program to broadcast seven days a week. Due to the launch of the Saturday version of the program, the Nine Network renamed the programs as Today: Weekend Edition. David Gyngell said the launch of the Weekend editions were a part of the Nine Network's plans to strengthen its news and current affairs department and return viewers to its once leading news service. In July 2009, Today: Weekend Edition was rebranded as Weekend Today.

In September 2012, Weekend Today was extended to 3 hours on Saturday mornings.

In September 2014, Deborah Knight permanently replaced Leila McKinnon as co-host of the show; as McKinnon wanted to spend more time with her family and focus on other projects on the Nine Network.

In February 2016, Cameron Williams announced his resignation from the Nine Network. Peter Stefanovic took over as co-host.

In November 2016, Peter Stefanovic announced that he would be moving to 60 Minutes in 2017 as a reporter. Tom Steinfort has been announced as Stefanovic's replacement.

In December 2017, Knight was appointed as host of Nine News Sydney on Friday and Saturday nights. She replaced Georgie Gardner who replaced Lisa Wilkinson on Today. It was later announced that 60 Minutes reporter Allison Langdon would replace Knight on Weekend Today. Peter Stefanovic also returned as host replacing Tom Steinfort who will become a reporter on 60 Minutes.

In December 2018, it was announced that Peter Stefanovic had parted ways with the Nine Network to pursue other opportunities. In January 2019, Today Extra host David Campbell was appointed as Stefanvoic's replacement. Clint Stanaway also joined the team as a sport presenter and Tim Davies as weather presenter.

In November 2019, the Nine Network announced that Karl Stefanovic would return to the show as co-host alongside Weekend Today co-host and 60 Minutes reporter Allison Langdon from January 2020.

In December 2019, it was announced that Today Extra host Richard Wilkins will replace Campbell, co-hosting alongside Rebecca Maddern. Jayne Azzopardi will continue to present news and Lauren Phillips will present weather.

In November 2021, it was announced that Rebecca Maddern had resigned from the Nine Network. Belinda Russell and Charles Croucher will replace Maddern and Jayne Azzopardi will continue to present news. Lauren Phillips also resigned from the show to concentrate on her radio career. In October 2022, Croucher was appointed as Nine News Political Editor.

In March 2023, Belinda Russell announced she had left Weekend Today. Her last appearance being 26 February. In April 2023, Clint Stanaway and Jayne Azzopardi were appointed as co-hosts with Sophie Walsh joining the team as news presenter.

In July 2024, Jayne Azzopardi was appointed as the news presenter on Today, replacing Brooke Boney. In August 2024, it was announced that Sophie Walsh would replace Azzopardi as co-host. Nine News reporter Lizzie Pearl will replace Walsh as news presenter.

In February 2025, Alison Piotrowski replaced Sophie Walsh as host. Piotrowski filled the role for 6 weeks prior to the official announcement. In September 2025, Clint Stanaway announced that he would be leaving the Nine Network after 25 years at the end of the year to focus on his radio career.

In February 2026, Michael Atkinson was appointed as co‑host. He had regularly filled in during the 2025–26 summer period prior to his appointment. In October 2026, Atkinson was appointed sports presenter on Today, replacing Danika Mason. In November 2026, it was announced that Dan Anstey had been appointed as co-host.

== Hosts ==
Presenter	Role	Tenure
Dan Anstey	Co-host & Sport	2027–present
Alison Piotrowski	Co-host	2025–present
Lizzie Pearl	News	2024–present
TBA	Weather	2026–present

=== Anchors ===
The hosts of Weekend Today have included:

Tenure	Hosts	
2009–2014	Cameron Williams	Leila McKinnon
2014–2016	Deborah Knight	Cameron Williams
2016	Deborah Knight	Peter Stefanovic
2017	Deborah Knight	Tom Steinfort
2018	Peter Stefanovic	Allison Langdon
2019	David Campbell	Allison Langdon
2020–2021	Richard Wilkins	Rebecca Maddern
2022	Richard Wilkins, Belinda Russell and Charles Croucher	
2023–2024	Clint Stanaway	Jayne Azzopardi
2024	Clint Stanaway	Sophie Walsh
2025	Clint Stanaway	Alison Piotrowski
2026	Michael Atkinson	Alison Piotrowski
2027-present	Dan Anstey	Alison Piotrowski

=== Fill-in presenters ===
Current presenters who have been fill-in hosts or co-hosts of Weekend Today in recent times include Dan Anstey, Lizzie Pearl, Kendall Gilding, and Lara Vella.

Previous substitute presenters have included Amelia Adams, Adam Hegarty, Alex Cullen, Brett McLeod, Wendy Kingston, David Campbell, Dougal Beatty, Tim Gilbert, Sylvia Jeffreys, Alicia Loxley, Davina Smith, Belinda Russell, Clint Stanaway, Ben Fordham, Ken Sutcliffe, James Bracey, Mark Burrows, Natalia Cooper, Michael Atkinson, Michael Genovese, Tom Steinfort, Tony Jones, Tim Davies, Gavin Morris, Brenton Ragless, Natalie Gruzlewski, Sarah Harris, Chris Kohler, Felix Van Hofe, Shelley Craft, Ross Greenwood, Chris Urquhart and Jonathan Uptin.

=== Reporters ===
Location	Reporter/s
Sydney	Lara Vella; Jack Hahn; Sarah Stewart
Melbourne	Christine Ahern; Izabella Staskowski
Queensland	Mia Glover; Andrea Crothers
Canberra	Charles Croucher; Andrew Probyn; Amalee Saunders; Connor McGoverne
Europe	Hannah Sinclair; Josh Bavas; Mimi Becker
USA	Lauren Tomasi; Reid Butler; Lily Greer

=== News ===
News presenters have included:

- Amber Sherlock (2009–2010)
- Alicia Gorey (2010–2011)
- Deborah Knight (December 2011 – May 2014)
- Sylvia Jeffreys (May 2014 – June 2014)
- Wendy Kingston (July 2014 – November 2015)
- Jayne Azzopardi (2016–2023)
- Sophie Walsh (2023–2024)
- Lizzie Pearl (2024–present)

=== Sport ===
Sport presenters have included:

- Michael Slater (Sunday: 2009–2010)
- Tim Gilbert (Saturday: 2009–2010)
- Tim Gilbert (2010 – September 2014)
- Nathan Brown (September 2014 – December 2014)
- Cameron Williams (2015–2016)
- Tom Steinfort (2016–2017)
- Peter Stefanovic (2016, 2018)
- Clint Stanaway (2019)
- Jayne Azzopardi (2020–2023)
- Clint Stanaway (2023–2025)
- Michael Atkinson (2026–present)

=== Weather ===
Weather presenters have included:

- Felicity Whelan (2009–2010)
- Emma Freedman (2010–2014)
- Natalia Cooper (2015–2016)
- Steve Jacobs (2017–2018)
- Tim Davies (2019)
- Lauren Phillips (2019–2021)
- Dan Anstey (2022–2026)
- TBA (2026-present)

=== Entertainment ===
Entertainment presenters have included:

- Michele Mahone (2009–2013)
- Susanne Messara (2013–2014)
- Gisele Ugarte (2014)
- Elle Halliwell (2015)

== See also ==
- List of Australian television series
- List of programs broadcast by Nine Network
