= Belinda Russell =

Australian journalist and news presenter

- Born: St George Queensland, Australia
- Education: University of Southern Queensland
- Occupations: Newsreader, weather presenter, reporter
- Years active: 1999–present
- Employer: Nine Network
- Television: Weekend Today; Today Extra; Nine News
- Spouse: Mark Calvert
- Children: 3 (Coco, Tallulah, Maddi)

Belinda Russell (born c. 1978 in Biloela, Queensland, Australia) is an Australian television newsreader, weather presenter and journalist.

Russell is currently co-host of Today Extra with David Campbell.

She has previously been a weather presenter on Nine News Sydney and co-host of Weekend Today

== Career ==
Belinda started her career at Network 10 in Brisbane in 1999, where she produced kids environment shows, and thereafter she joined the news team as a reporter.

In 2002, she moved to London and joined Sky News as a producer, becoming one of few Australian journalists to work on-camera for a British television program.

=== Nine Network ===
Russell returned to Australia in 2007 and joined Nine Network's program A Current Affair as a reporter in Sydney.

In 2013, she was appointed the weeknight weather presenter for Nine News Sydney.

In 2019, Belinda was announced as a co-host of Today Extra on Fridays while Sylvia Jeffreys was on maternity leave. This turned into a permanent Friday role from 2020 onwards.

In November 2021, it was announced that Russell will co-host Weekend Today alongside Charles Croucher and Richard Wilkins from January 2022 replacing Rebecca Maddern who resigned from the Nine Network. In March 2023, Russell announced her resignation as co-host of Weekend Today.

In September 2026, Russell was appointed co-host of Today Extra, replacing Sylvia Jeffreys.

== Personal life ==
=== Early life ===
Russell was born in St George, Queensland, Australia.

She completed a degree of Communications and Journalism at the University of Southern Queensland.

=== Family ===
She is married to Mark Calvert, the current head of programs at News24. She met him in the UK while working at Sky News.

Russell has 3 daughters; their names are Coco, Tallulah, and Maddi.
