= Peter Stefanovic =

Australian journalist, reporter and TV presenter

- Born: 19 November 1981 (age 44); Darlinghurst, New South Wales, Australia
- Occupations: Journalist; reporter; television presenter
- Years active: 2002–present
- Employer: Sky News Australia (division of News Corp)
- Television: First Edition
- Spouse: Sylvia Jeffreys (m. 2017)
- Children: 2
- Relatives: Karl Stefanovic (brother)

Peter Stefanovic (born 19 November 1981) is an Australian journalist, reporter and television presenter. He is a co-host of First Edition on Sky News Australia. He was previously a co-host of Weekend Today, senior reporter on Nine News and a contributing reporter for current affairs program 60 Minutes.

== Career ==
Stefanovic began his television career with WIN Television in 2002, reporting for WIN News in both Rockhampton and Canberra.

Stefanovic's career with the Nine Network started in 2004 as a reporter for Nine News and A Current Affair. He later became a foreign correspondent based in Nine's Los Angeles and London bureaus. After serving as a foreign correspondent for many years, Stefanovic returned to Australia in mid-2015 to work as a senior reporter and presenter across the Nine News platform. Stefanovic wrote a book about his time as a foreign correspondent, Hack in a Flak Jacket: Dispatches from an Aussie Foreign Correspondent, which was published by Hachette Australia in 2016.

In 2016, Stefanovic joined Weekend Today as a co-host alongside Deborah Knight. He presented the program until 2017, when he moved to 60 Minutes, filling in for Allison Langdon who was on maternity leave. Tom Steinfort replaced him as co-host of Weekend Today.

In January 2018, Stefanovic returned to Weekend Today as co-host, alongside Allison Langdon. In December 2018, he left the Nine Network.

In May 2019, Stefanovic joined Sky News Australia to co-host First Edition with Laura Jayes. During an interview on First Edition in May 2024 with an Indigenous Australian teenager who had won a $1 million prize, Stefanovic questioned the teenager about a theft he had been involved in two years earlier. The interview was widely condemned, and both Stefanovic and Sky News Australia later apologised.

== Personal life ==
Stefanovic is married to journalist and television presenter Sylvia Jeffreys and they have two children. In August 2026, Jeffreys announced that he and Jeffreys were expecting their third child.

Stefanovic was born in Darlinghurst, New South Wales to a Serbian-German father and an Australian mother. Stefanovic is the third of four children to mother Jenny. His siblings include co-host of Today, Karl Stefanovic, an older sister, and a younger brother Tom, who is a former cameraman for Nine News.
