= Dancing with the Stars (Australian TV series) season 17 =

Dancing with the Stars
- Season 17
- Hosted by: Grant Denyer; Amanda Keller
- Judges: Sharna Burgess; Craig Revel Horwood; Tristan MacManus
- Celebrity winner: Celia Pacquola
- Professional winner: Jarryd Byrne
- No. of episodes: 8

Release
- Original network: Network 10
- Original release: 9 February – 29 March 2020

Season chronology
- ← Previous; Season 16 Next → Season 18

The seventeenth season of the Australian Dancing with the Stars debuted on 9 February 2020. Grant Denyer and Amanda Keller returned as hosts, while Sharna Burgess, Craig Revel Horwood, and Tristan MacManus returned to the judging panel.

Due to the COVID-19 pandemic, the Grand Final was broadcast on 29 March 2020, one week earlier than planned. Comedian Celia Pacquola and Jarryd Byrne were announced as the winners, while podcaster Christian Wilkins and Lily Cornish finished in second place, actress Claudia Karvan and Aric Yegudkin finished in third, and comedian Ed Kavalee and Jorja Freeman finished in fourth.

== Couples ==
This season featured ten celebrity contestants. The full cast was announced on 14 January 2020. Professionals Marco De Angelis, Jeremy Garner, Joshua Keeffe, and Siobhan Power did not return; they were replaced by Julian Caillon, Shae Mountain, and Violeta Mugica.

Celebrity	Notability	Professional partner	Status
Dean Wells	Married At First Sight personality	Alexandra Vladimirov	Eliminated 1st on 16 February 2020
Angie Kent	Reality television star	Julian Caillon	Eliminated 2nd on 23 February 2020
Beau Ryan	NRL player	Megan Wragg	Eliminated 3rd on 1 March 2020
Travis Cloke	AFL player	Violeta Mugica	Eliminated 4th on 8 March 2020
Chloe Lattanzi	Singer & actress	Gustavo Viglio	Eliminated 5th on 15 March 2020
Dami Im	Singer-songwriter	Shae Mountain	Eliminated 6th on 22 March 2020
Ed Kavalee	Comedian	Jorja Freeman	Fourth place on 29 March 2020
Claudia Karvan	Actress	Aric Yegudkin	Third place on 29 March 2020
Christian Wilkins	Podcaster	Lily Cornish	Runners-up on 29 March 2020
Celia Pacquola	Comedian	Jarryd Byrne	Winners on 29 March 2020

== Scoring chart ==
The highest score each week is indicated in bold green with a dagger (†), while the lowest score each week is indicated in italicized red with a double-dagger (‡).

Color key:

Winners
Runners-up
Third place
Fourth place
Bottom two
Eliminated

Dancing with the Stars (season 17) - Weekly scores
Couple	Pl.	Week								
Couple	Pl.	1	2	1+2	3	4	5	6	7	8
Celia & Jarryd	1st	18	**25**†	**43**†	16	21+23=44	26+9=35	38+28=**66**†	27+30=**57**†	24+28=52 (Note: This couple finished in first place.)
Christian & Lily	2nd	18	15	33	21	21+26=47	29+10=**39**†	34+26=60	26+24=50	24+28=52 (Note: This couple finished in second place.)
Claudia & Aric	3rd	**21**†	19	40	23	24+23=47	20+7=27	34+28=62	24+20=44 (Note: This couple was in the bottom two, but was not eliminated.)	30+30=**60**† (Note: This couple finished in third place.)
Ed & Jorja	4th	14	10	24	19	24+26=**50**†	18+8=26	31+26=57	25+20=45	24+24=48‡ (Note: This couple finished in fourth place.)
Dami & Shae	5th	14	10	24	**24**†	17+23=40‡	19+5=24	22+26=48‡	18+13=31‡ (Note: This couple was eliminated.)	
Chloe & Gustavo	6th	18	23	41	**24**†	20+26=46	21+6=27	28+26=54		
Travis & Violeta	7th	17	8‡	25	15	14+26=40‡	10+4=14‡			
Beau & Megan	8th	13	16	29	21	19+23=42				
Angie & Julian	9th	14	19	33	14‡					
Dean & Alexandra	10th	11‡	12	23‡						

== Weekly scores ==
Unless indicated otherwise, individual judges scores in the charts below (given in parentheses) are listed in this order from left to right: Craig Revel Horwood, Sharna Burgess, Tristan MacManus.

=== Week 1 ===
Individual judges scores in the chart below (given in parentheses) are listed in this order from left to right: Mandy Moore, Sharna Burgess, Tristan MacManus

The couples performed a cha-cha-cha, foxtrot, tango or Viennese waltz. They were guest judged by Mandy Moore, who replaced Craig Revel Horwood for the first episode while he was in The O_{2} Arena in London for the final Strictly Come Dancing: The Live Tour! show of 2020.

Couples are listed in the order they performed.

Couple	Scores	Dance	Music
Celia & Jarryd	18 (6, 6, 6)	Cha-cha-cha	"Juice" – Lizzo
Ed & Jorja	14 (5, 4, 5)	Foxtrot	"It Had to Be You" – Frank Sinatra
Chloe & Gustavo	18 (5, 6, 7)	Foxtrot	"Love Song" – Sara Bareilles
Christian & Lily	18 (6, 6, 6)	Tango	"Bad Guy" – Billie Eilish
Dean & Alexandra	11 (4, 3, 4)	Cha-cha-cha	"U Can't Touch This" – MC Hammer
Angie & Julian	14 (5, 5, 4)	Foxtrot	"Grace Kelly" – Mika
Beau & Megan	13 (4, 4, 5)	Cha-cha-cha	"Bills" – LunchMoney Lewis
Travis & Violeta	17 (6, 6, 5)	Viennese waltz	"Give Me Love" – Ed Sheeran
Claudia & Aric	21 (7, 7, 7)	Cha-cha-cha	"Chain of Fools" – Aretha Franklin
Dami & Shae	14 (5, 4, 5)	Viennese waltz	"Lover" – Taylor Swift

=== Week 2 ===
Couples are listed in the order they performed.

Couple	Scores	Dance	Music	Result
Claudia & Aric	19 (5, 7, 7)	Salsa	"Vivir Mi Vida" – Marc Anthony	Safe
Christian & Lily	15 (3, 6, 6)	Cha-cha-cha	"Spinning Around" – Kylie Minogue	Safe
Ed & Jorja	10 (2, 4, 4)	Viennese waltz	"Never Tear Us Apart" – INXS	Bottom two
Dean & Alex	12 (3, 4, 5)	Tango	"Teeth" – 5 Seconds of Summer	Eliminated
Dami & Shae	10 (2, 4, 4)	Cha-cha-cha	"Hold My Hand" – Jess Glynne	Safe
Beau & Megan	16 (5, 5, 6)	Foxtrot	"Sign of the Times" – Harry Styles	Safe
Chloe & Gustavo	23 (8, 8, 7)	Charleston	"Do Your Thing" – Basement Jaxx	Safe
Angie & Julian	19 (6, 7, 6)	Tango	"Castles" – Freya Ridings	Safe
Travis & Violeta	8 (2, 3, 3)	Cha-cha-cha	"Ain't No Mountain High Enough" – Marvin Gaye & Tammi Terrell	Safe
Celia & Jarryd	25 (8, 9, 8)	Foxtrot	"Why Don't You Do Right" – Peggy Lee & Benny Goodman	Safe

Judges' votes to save

- Burgess: Ed & Jorja
- MacManus: Ed & Jorja
- Horwood: Did not vote, but would have voted to save Ed & Jorja

=== Week 3: My Most Memorable Year ===
The couples performed one unlearned dance to celebrate the most memorable year of their lives. Couples are listed in the order they performed.

Couple	Scores	Dance	Music	Result
Chloe & Gustavo	24 (7, 9, 8)	Contemporary	"Cold" – Annie Lennox	Safe
Claudia & Aric	23 (7, 8, 8)	Quickstep	"Graceland" – Paul Simon	Safe
Beau & Megan	21 (6, 8, 7)	Contemporary	"Show Me Love" – Robin S.	Safe
Travis & Violeta	15 (4, 6, 5)	Paso doble	"It's My Life" – Bon Jovi	Bottom two
Angie & Julian	14 (3, 5, 6)	Waltz	"Unforgettable" – Nat King Cole	Eliminated
Christian & Lily	21 (7, 7, 7)	Foxtrot	"When You Wish Upon a Star" – Leigh Harline & Ned Washington	Safe
Dami & Shae	24 (8, 9, 7)	Contemporary	"Hero" – Mariah Carey	Safe
Celia & Jarryd	16 (4, 6, 6)	Samba	"Independent Women" – Destiny's Child	Safe
Ed & Jorja	19 (6, 7, 6)	Jive	"Come Anytime" – Hoodoo Gurus	Safe

Judges' votes to save

- Burgess: Travis & Violeta
- MacManus: Angie & Julian
- Horwood: Travis & Violeta

=== Week 4: Latin Night ===
The couples performed one unlearned and one team Latin routine. Couples are listed in the order they performed.

Couple	Scores	Dance	Music	Result
Beau & Megan	19 (6, 7, 6)	Salsa	"Feels like Home" – Sigala, Fuse ODG & Sean Paul	Eliminated
Ed & Jorja	24 (8, 8, 8)	Paso doble	"Scott & Fran's Pasodoble" – from Strictly Ballroom	Safe
Chloe & Gustavo	20 (6, 7, 7)	Argentine tango	"Hands to Myself" – Selena Gomez	Bottom two
Travis & Violeta	14 (4, 5, 5)	Samba	"South of the Border" – Ed Sheeran, feat. Camila Cabello & Cardi B	Safe
Celia & Jarryd	21 (6, 8, 7)	Rumba	"Señorita" – Shawn Mendes & Camila Cabello	Safe
Dami & Shae	17 (5, 6, 6)	Samba	"Conga" – Gloria Estefan and the Miami Sound Machine	Safe
Claudia & Aric	24 (8, 8, 8)	Rumba	"Message to My Girl" – Split Enz	Safe
Christian & Lily	21 (7, 7, 7)	Paso doble	"Americano" – Lady Gaga	Safe
Beau & Megan Celia & Jarryd Claudia & Aric Dami & Shae	23 (7, 8, 8)	Team; Samba	"Magalenha" – Sérgio Mendes, feat. Carlinhos Brown	
Chloe & Gustavo Christian & Lily Ed & Jorja Travis & Violeta	26 (8, 9, 9)	Team; Paso doble	"Unstoppable" – E.S. Posthumus	

Judges' votes to save

- Burgess: Chloe & Gustavo
- MacManus: Chloe & Gustavo
- Horwood: Did not vote

=== Week 5: Back to school ===
The couples performed one unlearned dance and a disco marathon. Couples are listed in the order they performed.

Couple	Scores	Dance	Music	Result
Ed & Jorja	18 (6, 6, 6)	Cha-cha-cha	"Teenage Dream" – Katy Perry	Safe
Claudia & Aric	20 (8, 6, 6)	Tango	"(You Gotta) Fight for Your Right (To Party!)" – Beastie Boys	Safe
Dami & Shae	19 (6, 6, 7)	Waltz	"Come Away with Me" – Norah Jones	Bottom two
Chloe & Gustavo	21 (7, 7, 7)	Cha-cha-cha	"Lady Marmalade" – Christina Aguilera, Mýa, Pink & Lil' Kim	Safe
Travis & Violeta	10 (2, 4, 4)	Quickstep	"Are You Gonna Be My Girl" – Jet	Eliminated
Christian & Lily	29 (9, 10, 10)	Contemporary	"Video Games" – Lana Del Rey	Safe
Celia & Jarryd	26 (8, 9, 9)	Salsa	"No Scrubs" – TLC	Safe
Christian & Lily	10	Disco; Marathon	"Boogie Shoes" – KC & The Sunshine Band, "Disco Inferno" – The Trammps, "Boogie Wonderland" – Earth, Wind & Fire & "You Should Be Dancing" – Bee Gees	
Celia & Jarryd	9	Disco; Marathon	"Boogie Shoes" – KC & The Sunshine Band, "Disco Inferno" – The Trammps, "Boogie Wonderland" – Earth, Wind & Fire & "You Should Be Dancing" – Bee Gees	
Ed & Jorja	8	Disco; Marathon	"Boogie Shoes" – KC & The Sunshine Band, "Disco Inferno" – The Trammps, "Boogie Wonderland" – Earth, Wind & Fire & "You Should Be Dancing" – Bee Gees	
Claudia & Aric	7	Disco; Marathon	"Boogie Shoes" – KC & The Sunshine Band, "Disco Inferno" – The Trammps, "Boogie Wonderland" – Earth, Wind & Fire & "You Should Be Dancing" – Bee Gees	
Chloe & Gustavo	6	Disco; Marathon	"Boogie Shoes" – KC & The Sunshine Band, "Disco Inferno" – The Trammps, "Boogie Wonderland" – Earth, Wind & Fire & "You Should Be Dancing" – Bee Gees	
Dami & Shae	5	Disco; Marathon	"Boogie Shoes" – KC & The Sunshine Band, "Disco Inferno" – The Trammps, "Boogie Wonderland" – Earth, Wind & Fire & "You Should Be Dancing" – Bee Gees	
Travis & Violeta	4	Disco; Marathon	"Boogie Shoes" – KC & The Sunshine Band, "Disco Inferno" – The Trammps, "Boogie Wonderland" – Earth, Wind & Fire & "You Should Be Dancing" – Bee Gees	

Dance-off

- "There's Nothing Holdin' Me Back" – Shawn Mendes

Judges' votes to save

- Burgess: Dami & Shae
- MacManus: Travis & Violeta
- Horwood: Dami & Shae

=== Week 6: Judges' Team Face Off ===
Individual judges scores in the chart below (given in parentheses) are listed in this order from left to right: Craig Revel Horwood, Sharna Burgess, Courtney Act, Tristan MacManus

The couples performed one unlearned dance and also had to perform a team-up dance with another couple and one of the three judges. The judges choreographed and designed their team's dance and performed with them on the night, while the two non-performing judges and guest judge, former contestant Courtney Act, scored their routine.

For the first time in the history of the show, the dancers performed without a live audience.

Couples are listed in the order they performed.

Couple	Scores	Dance	Music	Result
Celia & Jarryd	38 (9, 10, 10, 9)	Charleston	"Bang Bang" – will.i.am	Safe
Ed & Jorja	31 (6, 8, 9, 8)	Tango	"Come Together" – The Beatles	Bottom two
Claudia & Aric	34 (8, 9, 9, 8)	Contemporary	"Ain't No Sunshine" (Lido remix) – Bill Withers	Safe
Christian & Lily	34 (8, 9, 9, 8)	Quickstep	"We No Speak Americano" – Yolanda Be Cool	Safe
Chloe & Gustavo	28 (7, 7, 7, 7)	Paso doble	"Game of Survival" – Ruelle	Eliminated
Dami & Shae	22 (4, 6, 6, 6)	Tango	"Outside" – Calvin Harris, feat. Ellie Goulding	Safe
Claudia & Aric Celia & Jarryd (with Sharna Burgess)	28 (9, X, 10, 9)	Freestyle	"Hit Me With Your Best Shot" – Pat Benatar	
Dami & Shae Ed & Jorja (with Tristan MacManus)	26 (8, 9, 9, X)	Freestyle	"All You Need Is Love" – The Beatles	
Chloe & Gustavo Christian & Lily (with Craig Revel Horwood)	26 (X, 9, 9, 8)	Freestyle	"No More Tears (Enough is Enough)" – Donna Summer & Barbra Streisand	

Dance-off

- "Good Time" – Owl City & Carly Rae Jepsen

Judges' votes to save

- Burgess: Ed & Jorja
- MacManus: Ed & Jorja
- Horwood: Did not vote, but would have voted to save Chloe and Gustavo

=== Week 7: Semifinals ===
The couples performed two unlearned dances to contest their position in the semi-finals. For the second time in the row, the dancers performed without a live audience.

Due to his father Richard Wilkins testing positive to COVID-19, Christian and Lily performed on a hotel roof while Christian was in isolation.

Couples are listed in the order they performed.

Couple	Scores	Dance	Music	Result
Ed & Jorja	25 (8, 9, 8)	Charleston	"I Got A Woman" – Ray Charles	Safe
Ed & Jorja	20 (6, 7, 7)	Argentine tango	"River" – Bishop Briggs	Safe
Claudia & Aric	24 (8, 8, 8)	Foxtrot	"My Baby Just Cares for Me" – Nina Simone	Bottom two
Claudia & Aric	20 (6, 7, 7)	Paso doble	"Shot Me Down" – David Guetta, feat. Skylar Grey	Bottom two
Celia & Jarryd	27 (9, 9, 9)	Tango	"El Tango de Roxanne" – from Moulin Rouge!	Safe
Celia & Jarryd	30 (10, 10, 10)	Jive	"Hustle" – Pink	Safe
Dami & Shae	18 (4, 7, 7)	Foxtrot	"Clown" – Emeli Sandé	Eliminated
Dami & Shae	13 (3, 5, 5)	Paso doble	"Rise" – Katy Perry	Eliminated
Christian & Lily	26 (9, 9, 8)	Viennese waltz	"It's a Man's Man's Man's World" – Jurnee Smollett-Bell	Safe
Christian & Lily	24 (7, 8, 9)	Jive	"Blinding Lights" – The Weeknd	Safe

Dance-off

- "Ain't That a Kick in the Head?" – Dean Martin

Judges' votes to save

- Burgess: Claudia & Aric
- MacManus: Claudia & Aric
- Horwood: Did not vote, but would have voted to save Claudia and Aric

=== Week 8: Grand Finale ===
In the first round, the contestants performed a redemption dance. In the second round, the contestants performed a fusion dance of two dance styles dedicated to a meaningful person or event in their life.

For the third time, the dancers performed without a live audience. Craig Revel Horwood was not present in the studio, however judged the show live from his home in London.

Couples are listed in the order they performed.

Couple	Scores	Dance	Music	Result
Celia & Jarryd	24 (7, 9, 8)	Samba	"I Wish" – Stevie Wonder	Winners
Celia & Jarryd	28 (9, 10, 9)	Contemporary & Viennese waltz	"Somebody to Love" – Queen	Winners
Claudia & Aric	30 (10, 10, 10)	Tango	"Addicted to You" – Avicii	Third place
Claudia & Aric	30 (10, 10, 10)	Foxtrot & Viennese waltz	"It's Oh So Quiet" – Bjork	Third place
Christian & Lily	24 (8, 8, 8)	Cha-cha-cha	"Cake by the Ocean" – DNCE	Runners-up
Christian & Lily	28 (9, 9, 10)	Jazz & Viennese waltz	"7 Rings" – Ariana Grande	Runners-up
Ed & Jorja	24 (8, 8, 8)	Viennese waltz	"One Last Song" – Sam Smith	Fourth place
Ed & Jorja	24 (8, 8, 8)	Jive & Quickstep	"Better Than Ever" – Flight Facilities, feat. Aloe Blacc	Fourth place

== Dance chart ==
- Week 1: One unlearned dance
- Week 2: One unlearned dance
- Week 3 (Most Memorable Year Night): One unlearned dance
- Week 4 (Latin Night): One unlearned dance
- Week 5 (Back-To-School Night): One unlearned dance & disco marathon
- Week 6 (Judges' Team Face Off): One unlearned dance & team dance
- Week 7 (Semi-Finals): Two unlearned dances
- Week 8 (Grand Finale) Redemption dance & fusion dance

Dancing with the Stars (season 17) - Dance chart
Couple	Week												
Couple	1	2	3	4		5		6		7		8	
Celia & Jarryd	Cha-cha-cha	Foxtrot	Samba	Rumba	Team; Samba	Salsa	Disco; Marathon	Charleston	Team; Freestyle	Tango	Jive	Samba	Contemp. & Viennese waltz
Christian & Lily	Tango	Cha-cha-cha	Foxtrot	Paso doble	Team; Paso doble	Contemp.	Disco; Marathon	Quickstep	Team; Freestyle	Viennese waltz	Jive	Cha-cha-cha	Jazz & Viennese waltz
Claudia & Aric	Cha-cha-cha	Salsa	Quickstep	Rumba	Team; Samba	Tango	Disco; Marathon	Contemp.	Team; Freestyle	Foxtrot	Paso doble	Tango	Foxtrot & Viennese waltz
Ed & Jorja	Foxtrot	Viennese waltz	Jive	Paso doble	Team; Paso doble	Cha-cha-cha	Disco; Marathon	Tango	Team; Freestyle	Charleston	Argentine tango	Viennese waltz	Jive & Quickstep
Dami & Shae	Viennese waltz	Cha-cha-cha	Contemp.	Samba	Team; Samba	Waltz	Disco; Marathon	Tango	Team; Freestyle	Foxtrot	Paso doble		
Chloe & Gustavo	Foxtrot	Charleston	Contemp.	Argentine tango	Team; Paso doble	Cha-cha-cha	Disco; Marathon	Paso doble	Team; Freestyle				
Travis & Violeta	Viennese waltz	Cha-cha-cha	Pasodoble	Samba	Team; Paso doble	Quickstep	Disco; Marathon						
Beau & Megan	Cha-cha-cha	Foxtrot	Contemp.	Salsa	Team; Samba								
Angie & Julian	Foxtrot	Tango	Waltz										
Dean & Alexandra	Cha-cha-cha	Tango											

== Ratings ==
Episode		Original airdate	Timeslot	Viewers (in millions)	Rank (Night)	Source
1	"Week 1: Premiere"	9 February 2020	Sunday 7:30 pm	0.593	7	
2	"Week 2"	16 February 2020	Sunday 7:30 pm	0.348	13	
2	"Week 2: Elimination"	16 February 2020	Sunday 7:30 pm	0.327	14	
3	"Week 3"	23 February 2020	Sunday 7:30 pm	0.482	8	
3	"Week 3: Elimination"	23 February 2020	Sunday 7:30 pm	0.468	9	
4	"Week 4"	1 March 2020	Sunday 7:30 pm	0.410	11	
4	"Week 4: Elimination"	1 March 2020	Sunday 7:30 pm	0.417	10	
5	"Week 5"	8 March 2020	Sunday 7:30 pm	0.352	10	
6	"Week 6"	15 March 2020	Sunday 7:30 pm	0.502	7	
7	"Week 7"	22 March 2020	Sunday 7:30 pm	0.482	13	
8	"Week 8"	29 March 2020	Sunday 7:30 pm	0.623	10	
8	"Week 8: The Winner Announced"	29 March 2020	Sunday 7:30 pm	0.635	9	
