= Sylvia Jeffreys =

Australian journalist and news presenter (born 1986)

- Born: 23 April 1986 (age 40); Brisbane, Queensland, Australia
- Education: University of Queensland
- Occupations: Journalist & television presenter
- Years active: 2005–present
- Employer: Nine Network
- Notable work: Today Extra as co-host Today as news presenter; Nine News (reporter and news presenter) A Current Affair as reporter
- Television: Today as co-host
- Spouse: Peter Stefanovic (m. 2017)
- Children: 2

Sylvia Jeffreys (born 23 April 1986) is an Australian journalist and television presenter. She is the host of the Nine Network‘s breakfast program Today with co-host Tom Steinfort as well as Jayne Azzopardi, Michael Atkinson, Dan Anstley and Richard Wilkins.

== Early life ==
Jeffreys was born on 23 April 1986 in Brisbane, Queensland and grew up in the suburb of Coorparoo. She attended Brisbane State High School where she was the School Captain in 2003.

== Career ==
Jeffreys began her media career in August 2005 at the Nine Network in Brisbane, working as a script assistant in the newsroom. She completed a Bachelor of Journalism/Bachelor of Arts at the University of Queensland whilst honing her skills in the production office.

In 2008, she began filing lifestyle stories on Queensland's Extra program, before returning to the newsroom in 2009.

In 2011, Jeffreys was appointed weekend weather presenter on Nine News Queensland. Sylvia reported on many news events as a reporter and weather presenter for Nine News Queensland including the floods in Central Queensland, Brisbane, Ipswich and Grantham. She also travelled to Tully to report on the damage carved by Cyclone Yasi.

In January 2012, Jeffreys moved to Sydney to join Today as a New South Wales reporter. She remained a reporter on the show until June 2013 and was replaced by Natalia Cooper. She then joined Nine News as a reporter and a fill in presenter on Nine Morning News, Nine Afternoon News, Weekend Today and Today.

In June 2014, Jeffreys rejoined Today as news presenter replacing Georgie Gardner.

In 2016, Jeffreys began hosting Nine's netball coverage, starting with the Fast5 Netball World Series in Melbourne. She also hosts Nine's coverage of the new Suncorp Super Netball competition, which started in 2017. She no longer presents the network's netball coverage.

In December 2018, it was announced that Jeffreys would not return to Today in 2019 and move onto other projects. In February 2019, the Nine Network announced Jeffreys would be spread across "a few departments" including A Current Affair.

In August 2019, Jeffreys was appointed host of 9NewsWatch, a bulletin broadcast at 8 pm on weeknights on Facebook.

In December 2019, it was announced that Jeffreys would co-host Today Extra replacing Sonia Kruger.

In September 2026, Jeffreys was appointed co-host of Today alongside Tom Steinfort. Belinda Russell replaced her as co-host of Today Extra.

== Personal life ==
In December 2013, Jeffreys said that she was dating fellow Nine News reporter Peter Stefanovic. Jeffreys and Stefanovic were fill-in co-hosts of Weekend Today while Cameron Williams and Leila McKinnon were on leave. In July 2016, Jeffreys announced that she was engaged to Stefanovic; the couple married on 1 April 2017. Their sons were born on 31 January 2020 and 3 April 2021. In August 2026, Jeffreys announced that she and Stefanovic were expecting their third child.

In July 2023, Jeffreys finished 5419th in the 2023 Gold Coast half marathon.
