= Tim Davies (journalist) =

Australian journalist and television presenter

- Born: 18 October 1983 (age 43)
- Education: Macleay College
- Occupations: Journalist, TV News presenter, TV Weather presenter
- Years active: 2003 to present
- Employer: Nine Network
- Known for: Weather Presenter on Today
- Television: Today; Nine News

Tim Davies (born 18 October 1983) is an Australian journalist and television news presenter and weather reporter, he started his career in radio.

Davies was previously weather preseenter on the Nine Network's Today program.

== Career ==
Davies studied journalism at Macleay College in Sydney, before joining radio station Nova 96.9 as a traffic reporter in 2003 before moving on to cover general news and report on major events for the DMG Radio Australia network.

In 2009, Davies joined the Seven Network as a producer, working on such programs as Sunrise, Weekend Sunrise and The Morning Show.

Davies joined Southern Cross Austereo as a news presenter in 2013, where he read the news on The Kyle and Jackie O Show on 2Day FM. Davies continued the role at 2Day FM in 2014 after The Kyle and Jackie O Show moved to KIIS 106.5.

In 2014, Davies left Southern Cross Austereo to join the Nine Network, initially as a producer and reporter for Nine News before becoming a presenter of Nine News: Early Edition and a fill-in host on Today Extra and Weekend Today.

In late 2019, it was announced that Davies would be replacing Steve Jacobs as the weather presenter on the network's breakfast program Today, commencing in 2020 as part of a widely-publicised overhaul.

In October 2022, Davies reported seeing masked men who he believed were looting houses as he and a Today crew arrived to set up a live cross in a flood affected area of Maribyrnong, prompting him to contact police. Victoria Police later confirmed they were investigating a man who allegedly stole several personal items from an unoccupied home while two accomplices waited in a blue Ford Territory.

In August 2026, Davies announced his resignation from Today, ending his seven‑year tenure as weather presenter. He finished up on Friday 18 September.

== Personal life ==
Davies is Christian. As a child, Davies attended St Francis de Sales, a Catholic primary school in Woolooware.

Davies is openly gay.

After a holiday in Austria in March 2020, Davies was on one of the first international flights to land in Australia after the federal government ordered all passengers arriving in Australia to self-isolate for 14 days at the onset of the COVID-19 pandemic.
