= Kerri-Anne =

2002–2011 Australian TV series

- Also known as: Mornings with Kerri-Anne; Mornings
- Genre: Morning Show; Talk Show
- Presented by: Kerri-Anne Kennerley
- Country of origin: Australia
- Original language: English
- No. of seasons: 10
- No. of episodes: 1,920

Production
- Executive producer: Louisa Hatfield
- Production locations: Sydney, New South Wales
- Running time: 150 minutes per episode (inc. commercials)

Original release
- Network: Nine Network
- Release: 28 October 2002 – 25 November 2011

Related
- Midday (1985–1998); Today Extra (2012–present)

Kerri-Anne is an Australian morning television program shown on the Nine Network, hosted by Kerri-Anne Kennerley. It was broadcast on weekdays at 9 am for two hours. The final episode of the series was on 25 November 2011. It was replaced by Today Extra, hosted by Sonia Kruger and David Campbell.

== History ==
Logo used from 2006 until the rebrand to Kerri-Anne in 2010

The program debuted on 28 October 2002 on the Nine Network to compete against Network Ten's Good Morning Australia with Bert Newton. The show began as a one-hour program from 9:30 to 10:30 am five days a week.

In the program's second season in 2003, the show progressed to an hour and a half from 9:30 to 11:00 am. After the network's decision to rest Here's Humphrey, which had been broadcast since 1965, the show began its third season as a two-hour program from 9:00 to 11:00 am.

Mornings proved to be a success against Good Morning Australia and, by the end of 2005, Newton announced that he would be returning to the Nine Network. As a result, Network Ten cancelled the program and replaced it with 9am with David & Kim at the start of the 2006 television season. The Seven Network saw the success that its competitors were having with the morning show format and created The Morning Show which began in June 2007. This meant that all three commercial stations from 9:00 to 11:00 am now have their own morning show.

However, this changed in 2010, when Kerri-Anne was up against only the Seven Network's The Morning Show for the first hour after a re-shuffle of Network Ten's programming. Network Ten's programing shift came after 9am with David and Kim was axed and replaced by Ten Morning News at 9 am, followed by its new morning show, The Circle at 10 am.

The program covered a variety of issues and had interviews, music, lifestyle and societal commentary. Jamie Malcolm often appeared on the show, presenting some of the infotainments and as a sidekick to Kennerley. Nine News updates were presented by Wendy Kingston (Monday-Thursday) and Deborah Knight (Friday) throughout the program.

In 2010, the Nine Network announced that the show would be renamed from Mornings with Kerri-Anne to just Kerri-Anne as part of the show's makeover. The makeover consisted of a brand new set, new graphics and more variety within the program, consisting of more news and entertainment. Kerri Elstub, formerly the producer for Nine's breakfast TV program, Weekend Today, took over as producer. This shift also had the program share the studio with Today. In February 2010, it was announced that a highlight show would be shown on Saturdays from 9 to 10 am.

Amanda Keller, Brendan Jones, Catriona Rowntree, Sophie Falkiner, Nicky Buckley, Shelley Craft, Mia Freedman, Livinia Nixon, Jaynie Seal, Jamie Malcolm and Steven Jacobs filled in for Kennerley when she was sick or away.

A year later there were rumours swirling that the Nine Network was looking to replace Kennerley in the timeslot, with speculation that Ita Buttrose, Lisa Wilkinson and Catriona Rowntree would replace her. There was also further speculation that the show would introduce a new co-host for Kennerley amid other format changes following confirmation that Nine had registered Mornings with IP Australia. It was later confirmed by the Nine Network that the program would be ending after 9 years with Kennerley to be replaced by Sonia Kruger in a new refreshed program. On 25 November 2011, the final edition of Kerri-Anne was broadcast. The final broadcast included appearances by regulars including veterinarian Dr. Michael Archinal, No Junk Mail regulars Brendan Jones and celebrity hairdresser Joh Bailey amongst others. There was also farewell messages from Nine Network personalities as well as a look back at the best moments from across nine years of the program. The broadcast ended surrounded by a balloon filled set featuring a TV shaped cake with Kennerley thanking and bidding farewell to the viewers after nine years also adding that she would be returning to media in the future. A best of highlights show was broadcast over the December/January period. The highlights show concluded on 3 February 2012, with replacement program Mornings hosted by Sonia Kruger and David Campbell premiering on Monday 6 February 2012.

== Segments ==
Kerri-Anne included a mix of lifestyle, cooking and interview segments along with advertorials and was presented in front of a live studio audience in Melbourne. The advertorials were for products from home-shopping companies such as Danoz Direct and Global Shop Direct and were presented by Roz Switzer, Jamie Malcolm and Paul Hancock.

- Celebrity and Hollywood entertainment news with Lucy Chesterton
- Cooking with various chefs everyday
- Current affairs with various commentators
- Movie and DVD reviews with Andrew Mercado
- Diet and nutrition with Dr Joanna McMillan
- Health and fitness with Amelia Burton
- Technology with Stephen Fenech
- IT with Charlie Brown
- Health with Dr Ric Gordon
- No Junk Male with Brendan Jones, Joh Bailey, Geoff Field and Ray Chesterton
- Pets with Dr Michael Archinal
- Nine News updates

== Summer time ==
During the summer non-ratings period from December to January, a pre-recorded highlands show was broadcast, showing notable segments from the year past. Advertorials were still shown.

== See also ==
- List of programs broadcast by Nine Network
- List of Australian television series
- List of longest-running Australian television series
