= Michele Mahone =

American television host

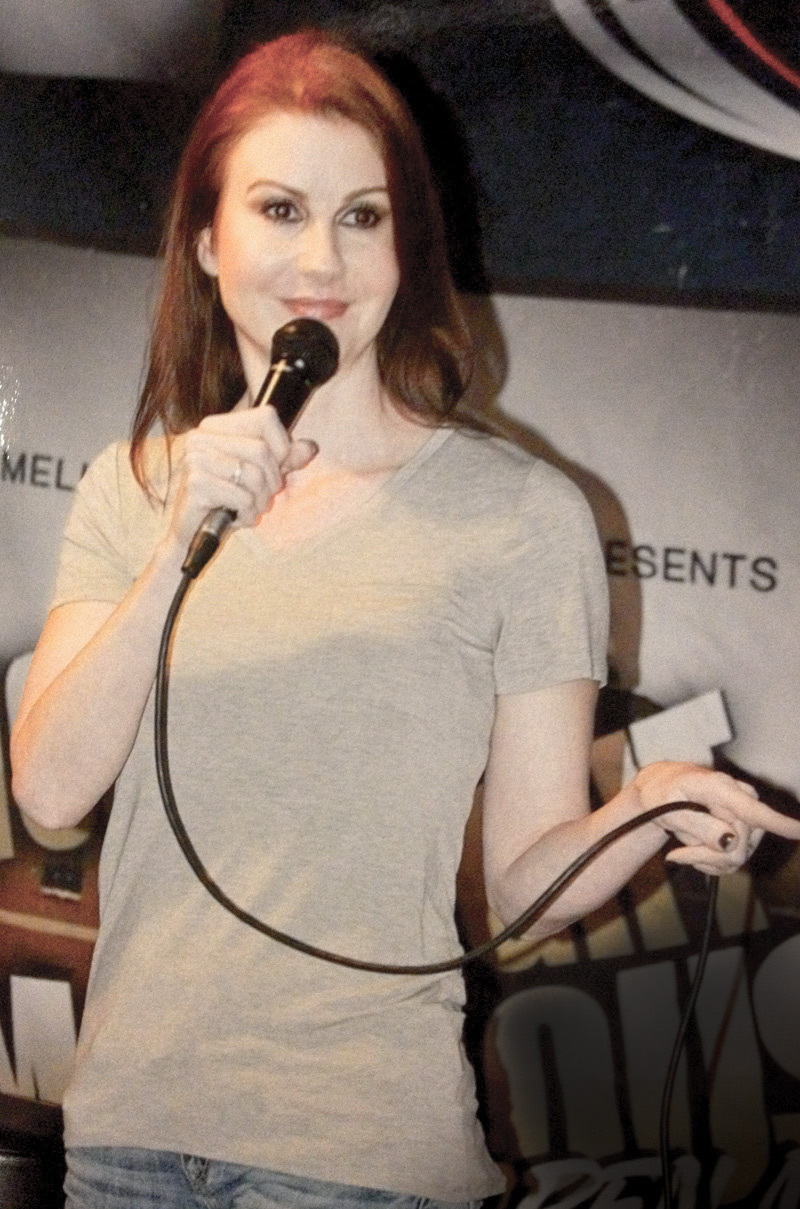
- Mahone performing stand up comedy
- Born: Michele Rae Mahone; Ashland, Kentucky

Comedy career
- Years active: 2005–present
- Medium: Television, stand up comedy
- Genres: Observational comedy, stand up comedy, southern humor, self-deprecating comedy, improvisational comedy, entertainment reporting
- Subject: Popular culture
- Website: michelemahone.com

Michele Mahone is an American television entertainment reporter and comedian.

== Early life ==
Mahone was born in Ashland, Kentucky and currently resides in Los Angeles. She was married at the age of seventeen. At nineteen, she gave birth to a son and was divorced by age twenty.

== Career ==
Mahone started her career in Hollywood in 1999 as an entertainment industry make-up artist. A few years later on a set, a popular television shopping host encouraged her to giving hosting a try. She made an audition tape for the Ultimate Shopping Network and was immediately hired.

She had several hosting jobs on various shopping networks, including America's Value Channel and Direct Shopping Network. She got a break when she was hired as an entertainment reporter for Weekend Today on Australia's Nine Network. She became known for her Kentucky accent, her catchphrase "How Do!", and her no-nonsense humorous reporting of Hollywood gossip. Mahone was also an entertainment and lifestyle reporter on Nine Network's show, Mornings with Kerri-Anne.

In 2014, Mahone was hired as an entertainment reporter for Network Ten's morning show Wake Up where she conducted red carpet interviews with Jennifer Lopez, Keith Urban, Harry Connick Jr. and Randy Jackson.

In May 2015, Mahone joined the Gem Shopping Network (GSN) as an on-air host, but was removed from the host list in March 2016. However she came back to the company in July 2016 and left in September 2016.

She hosted overnights at Shop LC from November 2019 to February 2024.

== Stand-up comedy ==
Mahone has appeared on the YouTube channel's show, "Comedy Time,"; she continues to perform live at several California clubs including The Comedy Store, The Ice House, Laugh Factory, The HAHA Cafe, and Flappers. Her favorite topics in her stand-up routines are her own family, Southern culture, the occasional moonshine mishap and she often draws from her experience as a Kentucky native who has toured the world. She begins her sets by greeting the crowd with her catchphrase, "How Do!"

== Radio ==
In 2009, Mahone began to work in Australian radio with Brisbane's 4BC breakfast show, Jamie and Ian. She has made guest appearances on numerous radio shows throughout Australia, Canada and the United States.

== Personal life ==
Mahone was married January 1, 2011 to her second husband and currently lives in Los Angeles.
