= First Edition (Australian TV program) =

Australian TV news series

- Genre: News, breakfast television, Current affairs
- Presented by: Peter Stefanovic (2019–present)
- Country of origin: Australia
- Original language: English

Production
- Production locations: Sydney; Canberra
- Running time: 3 hours (inc. adverts)

Original release
- Network: News24
- Release: 2002 – present

First Edition is an Australian breakfast television news program broadcast on News24. The program is currently hosted by Peter Stefanovic. The program is one of five breakfast news programs in Australia, competing with Sunrise, Today and News Breakfast, along with sister-station program News24 Breakfast. The program airs seven days a week.

The program is unusual for the fact from 2014 it was broadcast from two locations, with Jayes co-hosting from the News24 centre in the Sydney suburb of Surry Hills, and Gilbert hosting from studios in Parliament House, Canberra. Additionally, the program also transitions into political commentary program AM Agenda at 8:30am AEST, which Gilbert hosted solo until October 2018, after which he was joined by Jayes.

Weekend editions of the program were trimmed with the launch of Saturday Edition and Sunday Edition from 9 July 2016. Amy Greenbank, Tom Connell and Leanne Jones have served as substitute anchors of the program.

== History ==
The program is one of the longest running formats still broadcast on News24, having been on-air since at least 2002. Previous presenters of the program have included John Gatfield, Michael Willesee, Jr., Vanessa Grimm (née Trezise), Amber Sherlock, Leigh Hatcher, Susanne Latimore, Nina Stevens (née May) and Terry Willesee. Brooke Corte stepped down as host in September 2018 to become primetime anchor of Your Money, and was replaced by Laura Jayes.

Peter Stefanovic replaced Kieran Gilbert as co-anchor in July 2019. He now hosts the show solo.

== Special editions ==
On 7 November 2014, the program was broadcast from a Sydney Airport aircraft hangar, following a recent partnership deal between Sky News and Qantas. As part of the arrangement, Corte presented in-flight news bulletins on Qantas flights.
