= Christian Wilkins (model) =

Australian model (born 1995)

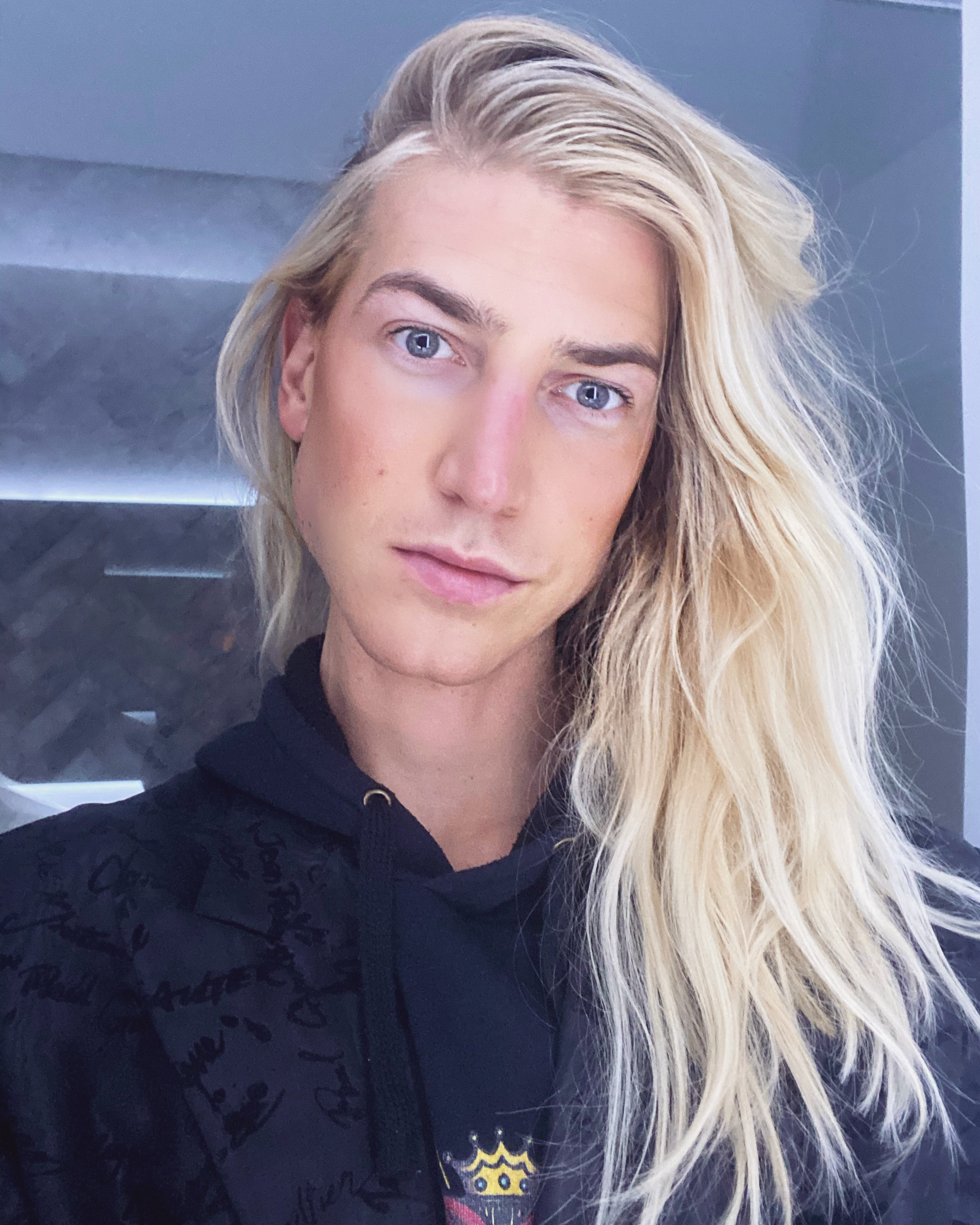
- Christian Wilkins, 2014
- Born: 25 April 1995 (age 31); Sydney, New South Wales, Australia
- Occupations: model; podcaster; television presenter; actor
- Years active: 2013−present
- Known for: challenging gender norms with his unique effeminate and non-binary style
- Television: Filthy Rich and Homeless; Dancing with the Stars; E! News; 2022 ARIA Music Awards; Eden
- Father: Richard Wilkins

Christian Wilkins (born 25 April 1995) is an Australian model and actor, best known for his clothing style which challenges gender stereotypes and norms.

== Career ==
Returning from Schoolies week after graduating from high school in 2013, Wilkins attended the ARIA Music Awards of 2013 in an outfit which he has referred to as his biggest fashion faux-pas.

In 2014, a gossip columnist in The Daily Telegraph described Wilkins' outfits as "garish" and his style as "eccentric". She also suggested Wilkins' only way to find any fame comparable to that of his well known father would be to audition for reality shows such as Big Brother or My Kitchen Rules.

In 2016, Wilkins was working with the Nine Network's senior stylist Kara Wilson on Nine's Instagram account @Channel9Style.

Wilkins appeared on the three-part SBS Television documentary series Filthy Rich and Homeless in 2017 where he was one of five wealthy people to be documented living amongst Melbourne's homeless community for ten days.

In 2018, he began hosting a podcast for PodcastOne with Andy Kelly called Radical Fashionism.

In early 2020, Wilkins was announced as one of the competitors on Network 10's Dancing with the Stars, the show's 17th season. Wilkins made it to the grand final where he placed as the runner-up behind series winner Celia Pacquola. The series aired during the onset of the COVID-19 pandemic in Australia and Wilkins was forced into isolation with his dance partner Lily Cornish after his father contracted COVID-19 after interacting with American actress Rita Wilson, who along with her husband Tom Hanks, had tested positive for COVID-19.

Following his time on Dancing with the Stars, Wilkins made his acting debut in the Stan series Eden which was filmed in 2020 and began streaming in June 2021.

Wilkins co-hosted the red carpet fashion at the 2022 ARIA Music Awards alongside his father Richard Wilkins and comedian Lucinda "Froomes" Price.

In February 2023, Wilkins modelled at the Australian fashion label Romance Was Born's runway show called "Stronger Together", as well as at a WorldPride event hosted by Jean Paul Gaultier.

Throughout his career to date, Wilkins has been an ambassador for the Perth Fashion Festival, Wayside Chapel, the Victorian Racing Club, Pantene and Karen Murrell lipsticks.

=== Style ===
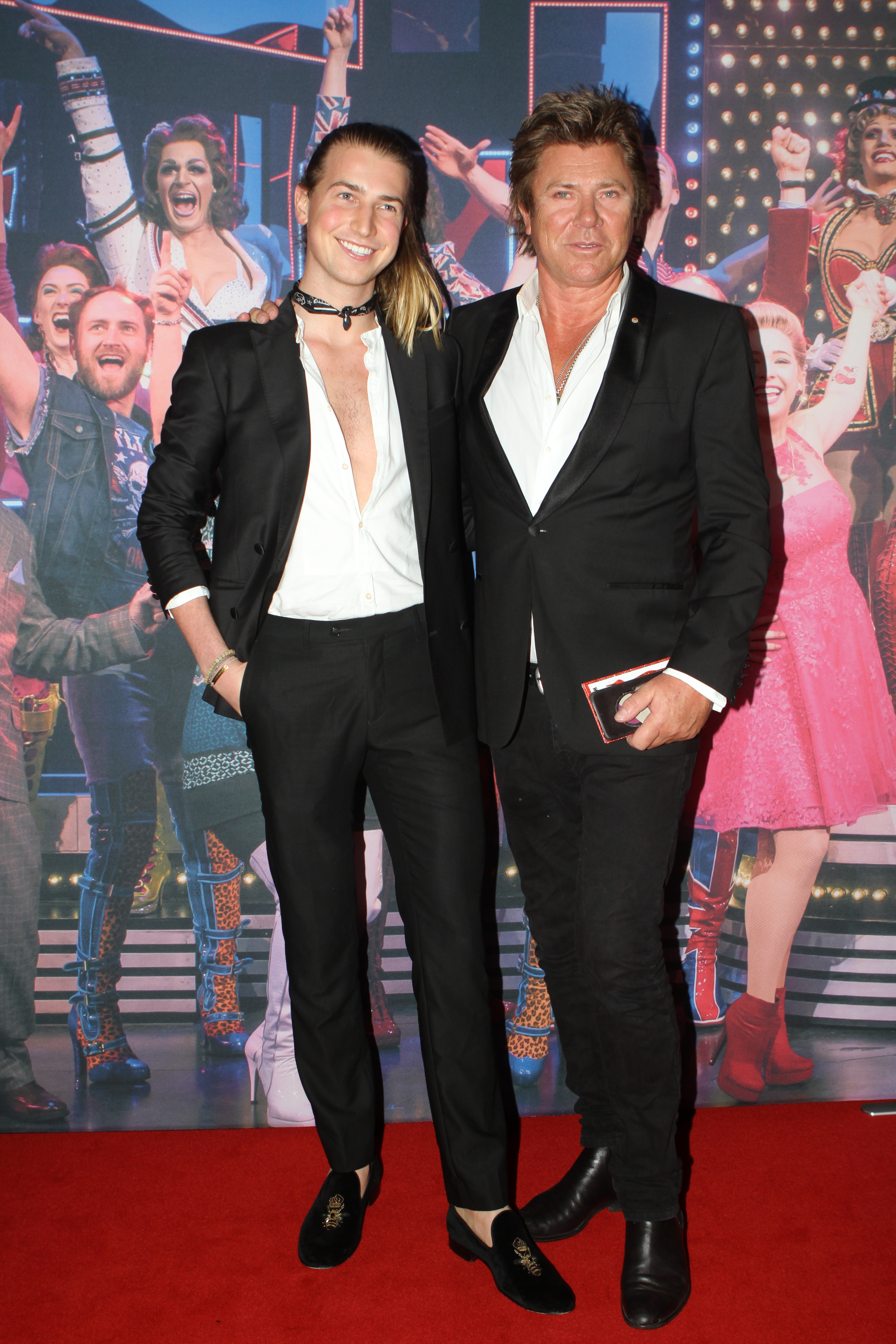
Christian Wilkins with his father Richard Wilkins, 2017

Wilkins has developed a unique non-binary style which has seen him challenge gender stereotypes by modeling outfits not traditionally worn by male models. At the Logie Awards of 2022, Wilkins wore a floor-length backless gown. Wilkins' decision to wear the dress prompted many social media users to abuse him. Speaking about the online abuse he received, Wilkins said: "I got a lot of DMs... People telling me to overdose, people telling me to die. I respect that you're allowed to have your opinions … but the hate was quite intense. That level of abuse is completely unacceptable."

Discussing his style in Body+Soul in 2022, Mary Madigan wrote that Wilkins "effortlessly blends textiles, fabrics, and colors. He creates trends or elevates them instead of just following them. His sheer dress at the Logies was a modern twist on 1950s glamor, and I don’t know if you’ve noticed, but it has been everywhere since." Madigan also bemoaned the fact that if he was a cis woman, Wilkins may be considered a fashion icon, rather than facing accusations of attention seeking, writing: "I’m so annoyed that he isn’t getting the fashion accolades he deserves because I’m certain things would be different if he was a straight woman" she wrote.

In February 2022, Wilkins criticized The Daily Mail for a headline about the outfit he wore on the opening day of the Sydney Mardi Gras Festival, which he described as "completely homophobic and misogynistic". The Daily Mail had headlined an article with "Dude looks like a lady! Richard Wilkins' flamboyant son Christian flaunts his VERY toned figure in a skintight pink mini dress with daring cut-outs", referencing Aerosmith's 1987 song "Dude (Looks Like a Lady)".

== Personal life ==
Wilkins is the son of Michelle Burke and television personality Richard Wilkins. His parents divorced when he was one. His maternal grandmother is Greek.

He attended Anglican Church secondary school, Redlands, Cremorne.

Wilkins is gay. Despite becoming known for a non-binary fashion style, Wilkins identifies as male and uses male gender pronouns.
