= Today Extra =

Australian morning television talk show

- Genre: Morning show Infotainment; Talk show
- Directed by: Wayne O'Donnell
- Presented by: David Campbell; Belinda Russell
- Country of origin: Australia
- Original language: English
- No. of seasons: 10

Production
- Executive producers: Louisa Hatfield (2012–2013); Natasha Daran (2014–2016); Mark Calvert (2017–2018); Bree Dwyer (2018–2019); Ashleigh Sculley (2023–present)
- Production locations: Sydney, New South Wales
- Running time: 150 minutes (weekdays); 120 minutes (Saturdays)

Original release
- Network: Nine Network
- Release: 6 February 2012 – present

Related
- Kerri-Anne (2002–2011); Today Weekend Today

Today Extra is an Australian morning talk show, with an infotainment base, hosted by David Campbell and Belinda Russell.

The show airs between 9:00 am and 11:30 am weekdays and follows the Nine Network's breakfast news program Today. The show is broadcast from the Nine Network studios in North Sydney, a suburb located on the North Shore of Sydney, New South Wales.

== History ==
The show premiered on the Nine Network on 6 February 2012 as Mornings, offering a mix of interviews, live music performances, and segments on cooking, lifestyle, fashion, beauty, and entertainment. The show replaced the long-running Kerri-Anne.

In January 2015, Mornings underwent a rebrand with a fresh set and logo. During Sonia Kruger’s maternity leave, Wendy Kingston hosted on Mondays while Georgie Gardner took over from Tuesday to Friday until Kruger’s return on 27 April 2015. Shortly after, on 5 May 2015, Mornings was extended to 11:30 am, leading to Nine's Morning News being rescheduled to the same time slot.

In January 2016, Nine announced that Mornings would be rebranded as Today Extra, aligning it with the network’s breakfast show, Today, while maintaining its focus on light entertainment and news updates. The program moved to the Today studio as part of this transition.

In January 2019, David Campbell was announced as the new host of Weekend Today, continuing to host Today Extra on Mondays through Wednesdays. Richard Wilkins joined as co-host on Thursdays and Fridays. Campbell remained in this role until December 2019, when it was announced he would host Today Extra full-time in 2020, with Wilkins taking over his role on Weekend Today.

In November 2019, Kruger announced her departure from Nine, with her final show airing on 15 November. Sylvia Jeffreys was confirmed as Kruger's permanent successor upon her return from maternity leave in 2020. Campbell resumed hosting duties on weekdays, while Wilkins transitioned to Weekend Today.

A notable incident occurred on 9 March 2020, when actress Rita Wilson appeared on the show in a segment hosted by Campbell and Belinda Russell, who was filling in for Jeffreys. Three days later, Wilson was diagnosed with COVID-19, prompting Nine to order all personnel who had interacted with her including Campbell and Russell into isolation. Following testing, none were found to have contracted the virus.

In September 2026, it was announced that Jeffreys would leave Today Extra in order to become the co-host of Today alongside Tom Steinfort. Belinda Russell was announced as her replacement.

== Hosts ==
Presenter	Role	Tenure
David Campbell	Co-host	2012–present
Belinda Russell	Co-host	2026–present
Deborah Knight	News (Monday to Thursday)	2025–present
Kate Creedon	News (Friday)	2025–present

=== Former hosts ===
Presenter	Role	Tenure
Sonia Kruger	Co-host	2012–2019
Richard Wilkins	Co-host (Thursday & Friday)	2019
Sylvia Jeffreys	Co-host	2019–2026

=== Fill-in presenters ===
Current presenters who have been fill-in hosts or co-hosts of Today Extra in recent times include Amber Sherlock, Lizzie Pearl, Renee Bargh, Brooke Boney, Richard Wilkins, Jayne Azzopardi, Lara Vella, Charles Croucher, Tim Davies and Tom Tilley.

== Regular segments ==
Presenter	Role
Yvette Duncan; Paul Hancock	Advertorials
Britt Warburton	Entertainment
Trevor Long	Technology
Jane de Graaff	Lifestyle
Quentin Long	Travel
Trent Nikolic	Auto
Alice Stolz	Property

== Ratings ==
The first episode of Mornings attracted 104,000, trailing The Morning Show, which attracted 166,000 viewers. However, in October 2012, Mornings beat The Morning Show for the first time since its launch.

On 19 March 2016, six weeks after the relaunch to Today Extra, the program won the week against The Morning Show. This included a victory in Perth, which for many years has been Nine's weakest market ratings-wise. It was the first time The Morning Show lost a week in its nine-year history.
