= Natalia Cooper =

Australian reporter and presenter (born 1984)

- Born: 1984 (age 41–42); Perth, Western Australia
- Other name: Natalia Fox
- Occupations: Journalist and TV presenter
- Years active: 2003–present
- Employer: Nine Network
- Spouse: Carl Fox (m. 2016)

Natalia Cooper (born 1984) is an Australian journalist, radio and television news presenter and reporter and author. Cooper is currently the weekday weather presenter for Nine News in Perth, Western Australia.

== Career ==
Cooper is currently the weekday weather presenter and reporter on Nine News Perth. She has previously been a weather presenter on Today, Weekend Today, Seven News Perth and a reporter on Nine News Sydney.

Cooper is also an occasional newsreader on the 9News National Late bulletin.

Cooper studied journalism at Curtin University. She began her career in television in Perth in 2003 after she was offered a cadetship at STW after she graduated. She worked as the station's weather presenter and fill-in news presenter for five years on Nine News Perth. She presented her first weather bulletin at age 19, and her first news bulletin at 20.

Cooper travelled the world for six months at the end of 2008 and then worked as a freelance journalist before moving to London in 2009. She came back to Perth to take up the position as Seven News weather presenter upon Jeff Newman's retirement.

In 2012, she relocated to Sydney and began working as a reporter for Nine News Sydney. In June 2013, Cooper replaced Sylvia Jeffreys as New South Wales reporter on Today. She remained as a reporter on Today until March 2014. She also filled in as weather presenter on Nine News Sydney when Amber Sherlock went on maternity leave in the same year.

In January 2015, Cooper replaced Emma Freedman as weather presenter on Weekend Today. She remained in the position until November 2016. In December 2016, she swapped places with Steven Jacobs, who moved to Weekend Today to spend more time with his family, and became the weather presenter on Today.

In February 2019, upon returning from maternity leave, Cooper was redeployed to Nine News as a presenter and reporter.

In November 2021, it was reported that Cooper would return to Perth with her family and continue as a senior reporter with Nine News.

== Personal life ==
In March 2016, Cooper married music producer, Carl Fox. In September 2018, Cooper announced that she was pregnant with her and her husband's first child. She gave birth to a son.
