= Today (Australian TV program) =

Australian breakfast television show

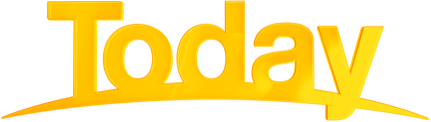
- Genre: Breakfast news program
- Directed by: Tim Cowie
- Presented by: Tom Steinfort; Sylvia Jeffreys; Jayne Azzopardi; Michael Atkinson; Dan Anstey
- Country of origin: Australia
- Original language: English
- No. of seasons: 44

Production
- Executive producer: Matthew Russell
- Production locations: 1 Denison Street; North Sydney, New South Wales
- Running time: 210 minutes (3.5 hours)

Original release
- Network: Nine Network
- Release: 28 June 1982 – present

Related
- Weekend Today; Today Extra

Today (also referred to as The Today Show) is an Australian breakfast television news and current affairs program, with an infotainment base, co-hosted by Tom Steinfort and Sylvia Jeffreys and includes news and weather updates. It broadcast weekdays on the Nine Network, as part of the Nine News division. The show also has a weekend edition called Weekend Today.

Today airs each weekday after Today Early News and runs from 5:30 am to 9:00 am before Today Extra, an extended light entertainment program, hosted by David Campbell and Belinda Russell. The show is broadcast from the Nine Network TCN studios in North Sydney, a suburb located on the North Shore of New South Wales. Although not affiliated with, the program shares a similar infotainment format and title of the long running American program of the same name.

== History ==
Officially launched as The National Today Show, Today is Australia's longest running morning breakfast news program. The show premiered on 28 June 1982. The original hosts, Steve Liebmann and Sue Kellaway, spent four years together before Liebmann left to present the evening news for Network Ten in Sydney.

Former 60 Minutes reporter George Negus took over the male presenting role, but after four years, Liebmann returned to the Nine Network, hosting Today for a long tenure with co-presenter Liz Hayes and subsequently Tracy Grimshaw. However, in December 2004, Liebmann suffered a mild heart attack, prompting him to retire from breakfast television.

Karl Stefanovic, a National Nine News reporter replaced Liebmann in 2005, whilst co-host Tracy Grimshaw left Today at the end of 2005 to replace Ray Martin as host of A Current Affair. While it had been widely speculated in the Australian press that Seven News presenter Chris Bath would co-host Today with Stefanovic from January 2006, the position instead went to former Ten News presenter Jessica Rowe. Rowe had mixed beginnings as the co-host of Today with some viewers and commentators criticising her because of her dress-sense and her apparent over-happiness, citing her constant nervous laughter. Following her court case against Network Ten, Rowe was subjected to comments from the media and viewers that she should be sacked and was not right for the role of Today. Rowe's replacements while on maternity leave were Sarah Murdoch and Kellie Sloane, who both saw a significant increases in ratings. They both presented until Rowe's departure from the show, with the Nine Network releasing a press statement on 5 May 2007 stating that Rowe had left the Network to "take up other opportunities for her career".

In May 2007, former Weekend Sunrise co-host Lisa Wilkinson was appointed as Jessica Rowe's successor. In October 2017, Wilkinson resigned effective immediately from the network due to contract negotiations failing. She finished on the show on 16 October 2017. It was later announced that Wilkinson would join Network Ten and The Project as a senior host and editor. Deborah Knight temporarily replaced Wilkinson until Georgie Gardner, who previously regularly appeared on the program as its news presenter, was announced as a permanent replacement host. Gardner commenced hosting Today in January 2018.

In December 2018, it was announced that Karl Stefanovic would not be returning to Today after 14 years as host.

On 5 January 2019, the Nine Network announced that Deborah Knight would join Georgie Gardner as co-host replacing Stefanovic. It was also announced that Tom Steinfort would replace Sylvia Jeffreys as news presenter and Tony Jones would replace Tim Gilbert as sports presenter, whilst Brooke Boney would become entertainment presenter, working alongside Richard Wilkins. The new team began on 14 January 2019. In February 2019 it was announced that Natalia Cooper would not return to the show after her maternity leave, with Steven Jacobs becoming weather presenter once again.

The revamped line-up attracted constant media scrutiny and struggled to attain viewers – at times recording record-low ratings. It has been noted by some commentators however that the viewership gap with Sunrise was actually higher in Wilkinson's first year as co-host in 2007, with the audience building over time to eventually overtake Sunrise. The lower ratings were also attributed to the fact that overall television audiences had decreased in comparison with prior years.

In November 2019, the Nine Network announced that Karl Stefanovic would return to the show as co-host alongside Weekend Today co-host and 60 Minutes reporter Allison Langdon from January 2020. Both Georgie Gardner and Deborah Knight remained with the Nine Network with Gardner leaving the show immediately.

In December 2019, it was announced that Perth-based Tracy Vo would replace Tom Steinfort as news presenter, Alex Cullen would replace Tony Jones as sports presenter and Tim Davies would replace Steven Jacobs as weather presenter. However, in March 2020 at the start of the COVID-19 pandemic, when the Western Australian state government imposed strict 14-day hotel quarantine for all incoming travellers from interstate and overseas, Vo permanently returned to Perth in order to be closer to her father who has a rare auto-immune condition. Alex Cullen now presents both news and sport.

On 9 September 2022, Today broke the news of the death of Queen Elizabeth II. Karl Stefanovic and Allison Langdon presented rolling coverage live from the United Kingdom from 4:30 am until 12 midday, when the coverage was taken over by David Campbell and Sylvia Jeffreys. Coverage included live crosses to Tracy Vo and Leila McKinnon, Charles Croucher and Carrie-Anne Greenbank, as well as various interviews with royal commentators including Camilla Tominey and Dickie Arbiter.

In November 2022, the Nine Network announced that 60 Minutes reporter Sarah Abo would replace Allison Langdon from January 2023. Langdon has been appointed as host of A Current Affair replacing Tracy Grimshaw.

In April 2024, 9News: Early Edition rebranded to Today Early News to better align and integrate with the show.

In June 2026, Stefanovic departed Today for the second time due to a podcast interview he did independently with British far-right activist Tommy Robinson. Although Stefanovic's contract was due to expire in November 2026, Nine and Stefanovic both agreed it was not possible for him to host Today while having his independent podcast, and subsequently decided his departure would be immediate.

In September 2026, it was announced that Abo would depart Today and the Nine Network at the conclusion of her maternity leave. Shortly afterwards, Sylvia Jeffreys and Tom Steinfort were announced as the program's new permanent co-hosts. Together, they bring more than four decades of experience in journalism and television presenting, having held prominent roles across 60 Minutes, Nine News and Today Extra. As a result of Jeffreys' move to Today, Belinda Russell was appointed as the new permanent co-host of Today Extra, joining David Campbell

In October 2026, the show named Michael Atkinson as their new sports presenter, days after Danika Mason bid farewell to the role.

== Today Extra: 2016–present ==
In January 2016, Nine announced that Mornings would be rebranded as Today Extra to become an extension of the network's breakfast show Today. The show was moved to the Today studio, while keeping its focus on light entertainment and news updates.

In January 2019, Campbell was announced the new host of Weekend Today. He will continue to host the program on Monday, Tuesday and Wednesday, with Richard Wilkins joining the show as co-host on Thursday and Friday.

In November 2019, Kruger announced her resignation from the Nine Network, with her last show on Friday 15 November. In December 2019, it was announced that Kruger's temporary replacement Sylvia Jeffreys will replace Kruger permanently upon her return from maternity leave in 2020. It was also announced that Campbell will return to hosting the show each weekday, with Wilkins moving to hosting Weekend Today.

When Jeffreys became co-host of Today, Belinda Russell was appointed as her successor. A familiar face to viewers, Russell had regularly filled in as co-host over many years.

== Weekend Today: 2009–present ==
The Nine Network introduced weekend editions of Today in 2009, beginning with Today on Sunday on 1 February, followed soon after by Today on Saturday. Their launch made Today the first Australian breakfast news program to broadcast seven days a week. The weekend programs were initially branded Today: Weekend Edition before adopting the permanent title Weekend Today in July 2009.

Across the following decade, the weekend format evolved with multiple presenter changes. Notable hosts have included Cameron Williams, Leila McKinnon, Deborah Knight, Peter Stefanovic, Allison Langdon, David Campbell, Rebecca Maddern, Belinda Russell, Charles Croucher, Clint Stanaway, Jayne Azzopardi and Sophie Walsh. The program also expanded its runtime and underwent several newsroom reshuffles as part of Nine's broader news strategy.

From the early 2020s, further adjustments continued, with new presenters joining the news and weather roles and several hosts moving to Nine News or 60 Minutes.

As of February 2026, Weekend Today is hosted by Michael Atkinson and Alison Piotrowski, with Lizzie Pearl presenting news and Dan Anstey presenting weather.

=== Today on Saturday: 1992–2002 ===
After the initial success of Today, a Saturday edition was produced in the early nineties. Hosted by Tracy Grimshaw, it featured more news, politics and economic reports. Tracy Grimshaw was later followed by Tara Brown and Richard Wilkins, before reporter Helen Dalley joined the program in 1996. These hosts were accompanied by news presenters Michael Usher, Anna Coren and Mark Burrows. In 2002, Today on Saturday was cancelled due to budget cuts by the Nine Network.

== Anniversaries and reunions ==
Today celebrated its 25th anniversary, on 28 June 2007, by travelling to five different Australian cities in one week, something which had never been before attempted by an Australian television show. Former Today hosts and musical guests were involved.

On the official day marking the 25th anniversary, former hosts who made an appearance included Ian Ross, Tracy Grimshaw, Monte Dwyer, Liz Hayes and Helen Dalley. Sami Lukis, who replaced Monte Dwyer, did not appear, nor did original co-host Sue Kellaway. Original co-host Steve Liebmann was also unable to attend, nor was current weather presenter Steven Jacobs, however video messages from both were aired.

Today celebrated its 30th anniversary in 2012. The show began the year by unveiling a new set, logo and graphics.

In September, Today held a week-long celebration which included flashbacks from earlier episodes and live appearances by former hosts such as Steve Liebmann and Sue Kellaway with Tracy Grimshaw, Monte Dwyer and Sarah Murdoch. Liz Hayes was unable to join the show due to being on assignment with 60 Minutes but shared her memories in a prerecorded message. Video messages were also left by Brian Bury, George Negus and Joan McInnes

Today celebrated its 40th anniversary, on 1 July 2022, with a special broadcast it featured guest appearances from former hosts Steve Liebmann, Sue Kellaway, Tracy Grimshaw, Lisa Wilkinson and Georgie Gardner.

The team revisited four decades of major news events, celebrity guests, road shows around Australia and the world and wild viral moments. A dedicated highlights show, Today 40th Anniversary Special aired on 2 July which featured highlights from the special broadcast.

== Format ==
Today, an offshoot of Nine News, predominantly presents news, sport, weather, entertainment and current affairs, focusing on the first news of the day. However the show also features topics including consumer affairs, health, politics, education, fashion, and the business and finance world. The show has daily feedback and topic segments for viewers to send in their thoughts and opinions via email, text messages and the show's website.

Initially, the program was only a two-hour broadcast, airing from 7:00 am to 9:00 am. After dropping Nine Early Morning News, the network moved Today to a 6:00 am start. Again, as part of the 2008–2009 Nine News brand's major expansion, in 2008 the show was changed to a three and a half-hour format, starting at 5:30 am to now "perfect match" breakfast radio stations. This move included an extended news, sport, finance and weather segment prior to the main program at 6:00 am. Weekend Today airs on both Saturday and Sunday from 7:00 am to 10:00 am.

== Hosts ==
Presenter	Role	Tenure
Sylvia Jeffreys	Host	2026–present
Tom Steinfort	Host	2026–present
Jayne Azzopardi	News	2024–present
Michael Atkinson	Sport	2026–present
Dan Anstey	Weather	2026–present
Richard Wilkins	Entertainment	1994–present
Renee Bargh	Entertainment	2024–present

=== Previous anchors ===
The main presenters of Today have included:

Tenure	Presenters	
1982–1985	Steve Liebmann	Sue Kellaway
1986	Steve Liebmann	Patrice Newell
1986–1987	Steve Liebmann	Liz Hayes
1987–1990	George Negus	Liz Hayes
1990–1996	Steve Liebmann	Liz Hayes
1996–2005	Steve Liebmann	Tracy Grimshaw
2005	Karl Stefanovic	Tracy Grimshaw
2006	Karl Stefanovic	Jessica Rowe
2007–2017	Karl Stefanovic	Lisa Wilkinson
2018	Karl Stefanovic	Georgie Gardner
2019	Deborah Knight	Georgie Gardner
2020–2022	Karl Stefanovic	Allison Langdon
2023–2026	Karl Stefanovic	Sarah Abo
2026–present	Tom Steinfort	Sylvia Jeffreys

== Reporters ==
Location	Reporter/s
Sydney	Lara Vella; Jack Hahn; Sarah Stewart
Melbourne	Christine Ahern; Izabella Staskowski
Queensland	Mia Glover; Andrea Crothers
Adelaide	Bianca Wylie
Canberra	Charles Croucher; Andrew Probyn; Amalee Saunders; Connor McGoverne
Europe	Hannah Sinclair; Josh Bavas; Mimi Becker
USA	Lauren Tomasi; Reid Butler; Lily Greer

=== Fill-in presenters ===
Host	Fill-in presenters
Tom Steinfort	Charles Croucher, Michael Atkinson, David Campbell
Sylvia Jeffreys	Jayne Azzopardi, Alison Piotrowski, Amelia Adams
Jayne Azzopardi	Alison Piotrowski, Lizzie Pearl, Lara Vella
Michael Atkinson	Zac Bailey, Emma Lawrence
Dan Anstey	Taylor Haynes, Mia Glover, Luke Jacobz

Current presenters who have been fill-in hosts or co-hosts of Today in recent times include Charles Croucher, Michael Atkinson, James Bracey, David Campbell, Jayne Azzopardi, Alison Piotrowski, Amelia Adams and Leila McKinnon.

Previous substitute presenters have included Alex Cullen, Christine Ahern, Dan Anstey, Samantha Armytage, Michael Genovese, Brooke Boney, Belinda Russell, Gavin Morris, Ben Fordham, Cameron Williams, Kellie Sloane, Tim McMillan, Tracy Vo, Sarah Murdoch, Sharyn Ghidella, Kim Watkins, Helen Dalley, Richard Wilkins, Deborah Knight, Tom Steinfort, Ellen Fanning, Ali Moore, Sophie Walsh, Michael Willesee Jr, Dr Nick Coatsworth, Michael Pascoe, Joel Dry, Peter FitzSimons, Peter Overton, Michael Wipfli, Ross Greenwood, Michael Usher, Ken Sutcliffe, Mark Ferguson, Jennifer Keyte, Garry Lyon, Rebecca Maddern, Eddie McGuire and even Clive James on one occasion while the show was broadcasting from London. The former Premier of Victoria, Joan Kirner, presented the show on one occasion.

=== News ===
The idea of providing the latest news has been critical to the function of the program. Under the current format, seven main bulletins are delivered, once every half-hour.

News presenters	Tenure
Eric Walters	1982–1990
Ian Ross	1991–2001
Sharyn Ghidella	2001–2005, 2005–2006
Leila McKinnon	February 2005 – June 2005
Georgie Gardner	2006–2014
Sylvia Jeffreys	2014–2018
Tom Steinfort	2019
Tracy Vo	January 2020 – March 2020
Alex Cullen	March 2020 – December 2022
Brooke Boney	January 2023 – July 2024
Jayne Azzopardi	July 2024 – present

During 2007, Kellie Sloane and Allison Langdon filled in for Georgie Gardner who was on maternity leave.

In July 2009, Georgie Gardner was appointed Nine News Sydney presenter on Friday and Saturday nights, she juggled her commitments with Today and presented the news from Tuesday to Friday. The Weekend Today news presenter would present the news on Monday. These news presenters have included Amber Sherlock (2009–2010), Alicia Loxley (2010–2011) and Deborah Knight (2011–2014).

In 2014, Sylvia Jeffreys was appointed news presenter on Today replacing Gardner. Given that Sylvia would not be required to balance her role with any additional roles within the network, she was able to commit to the program five days per week, meaning the specialised Monday morning news presenting role was no longer needed. In December 2018, it was announced that Jeffreys would not return to Today in 2019 and move onto other projects.

In January 2019, Tom Steinfort was announced as Jeffrey's replacement. In December 2019, it was announced, Nine Live Perth news presenter, Tracy Vo would be the news presenter with Steinfort returning to 60 Minutes.

In March 2020, Vo permanently returned to Perth due to the COVID-19 pandemic. Alex Cullen presented both news and sport until December 2022.

In January 2023, Brooke Boney replaced Alex Cullen as news presenter with Cullen focusing on sport.

In March 2024, Boney announced her resignation from the Nine Network to take up an opportunity to study at Oxford University. She finished with the network after the 2024 Summer Olympics. In July 2024, Jayne Azzopardi was appointed as the news presenter.

Alison Piotrowski, Lizzie Pearl, Sophie Walsh, Lara Vella and Tim Davies are the main substitute news presenters.

In addition, many other journalists — including Jayne Azzopardi, Mark Burrows, Brett McLeod, Charles Croucher, Christine Ahern, Mia Glover, Andrea Crothers, Amelia Adams, Gabrielle Boyle, Amber Sherlock, Wendy Kingston, Kim Watkins, Ben Fordham, Peter Stefanovic, Jane Goldsmith, Vicky Jardim, Majella Wiemers, Helen Kapalos, Heather Foord, Peter Overton, Tracy Vo, Lizzie Pearl, Aislin Kriukelis, Allison Langdon, Andrew Lofthouse, Izabella Staskowski, Maggie Raworth, Peter Hitchener, Mark Ferguson and Michael Thomson have also presented the news on various occasions.

==== Today Perth News ====
Today Perth local news inserts were introduced in March 2014, but were axed in May 2020.

In January 2024, Today Perth local news inserts were re-introduced presented by Lara Vella from the TCN studios in North Sydney.

News presenters	Tenure
Tim McMillan	2014–2015
Tracy Vo	2016–2017
Louise Momber	2018–2019
Michael Genovese	2020
Lara Vella	2024–present

=== Finance ===
Jayne Azzopardi currently presents the finance news after presenting the news. Each morning at 7:55am, Effie Zahos presents a 'Your Money' finance segment based around consumer insights and information.

=== Sport ===
Michael Atkinson currently presents sports news after the news bulletin every half-hour. In 2006, Cameron Williams was appointed as the inaugural sports presenter previously the news presenter would present sport headlines. Williams presented sport from 2006 until 2010, leaving the role to focus on co-hosting Weekend Today and Nine News. Ben Fordham presented sport from 2011 until 2014. He left to focus on his family and 2GB radio show. In January 2019, Tony Jones was announced as Gilbert's replacement. Jones remained in the position until he was replaced in November 2019. In December 2019, it was announced that Alex Cullen will replace Tony Jones as sport presenter permanently from January 2020. In January 2025 Alex Cullen parted ways with Nine due to accepting a $50,000 Gift by him calling someone the 'McLaren Guy'. In February 2025, Cullen was replaced by Danika Mason. In October 2026, Mason announced that she would leave the program ahead of maternity leave and would return to Nine's National Rugby League coverage in 2027.

Sport presenters	Tenure
Cameron Williams	2006–2010
Andrew Voss	Tuesday – Thursday, 2009
Georgie Gardner	Tuesday – Thursday, 2010
Ben Fordham	2011–2014
Tim Gilbert	2014–2018
Tony Jones	2019
Alex Cullen	2020–2025
Danika Mason	2025–2026
Michael Atkinson	2026–present

=== Weather ===
Dan Anstey currently presents the weather after each news and sport bulletin, every half-hour. TBA broadcasts are mostly remote from different locations each day.

Weather presenters	Tenure
Brian Bury	1982–1991
Monte Dwyer	1991–2002
Sami Lukis	2002–2004
Natalia Cooper	2016–2018
Steven Jacobs	2005–2016, 2019
Tim Davies	2020–2026
Dan Anstey	2026–present

Taylor Haynes, Mia Glover and Izabella Staskowski are substitute weather presenters.

Alex Heinke, Abby Coleman, Aislin Kriukelis, Julie Snook, Rose Jacobs, Emma Freedman, Amelia Adams, Sylvia Jeffreys, Scherri-Lee Biggs, Giaan Rooney, Mia Glover, Gorgi Coghlan, Izabella Staskowski, Dave Kirwan, Jaynie Seal, Dan Anstey, Livinia Nixon, Carolyne Randoe and Majella Wiemers have all presented the weather on various occasions.

=== Entertainment ===
Today's entertainment presenters, Richard Wilkins and Renee Bargh, presents daily features, interviews, movie and television reviews from across the world of show business. In December 2018, it was announced that Brooke Boney would join Today as an entertainment reporter and will work alongside Wilkins. In December 2019, it was announced that Boney would remain as entertainment reporter with Richard Wilkins moving across to co-host Weekend Today In July 2024, it was announced that Richard Wilkins and Renee Bargh would replace Brooke Boney.

Entertainment presenters	Tenure
Joan McInnes	1982–1988
Danny Bonaduce	2000–2003
Richard Reid	2004–2015
Brooke Boney	2019–2024
Richard Wilkins	1994–present
Renee Bargh	2024–present

=== Technology ===
Technology commentator Trevor Long appears regularly with news related to technology, as well as presenting segments explaining technology or new gadgets. During the 2020 pandemic, his segments were primarily presented from his own studio at EFTM.

== Traffic ==
Traffic reports are shown at regular intervals during the show, and are presented in some cities from a local helicopter. Traffic reports only air into the metropolitan regions of Sydney, Melbourne and Brisbane. They are produced and presented by traffic reporters from the Australian Traffic Network.

== Ratings ==
From 2004 to 2007, Sunrise won the ratings battle, defeating Today by 62% between January and May 2007. However, during 2007, Today slightly improved its ratings and made audience gains, and made a 9% rise from 2006 between 7am and 9am, and a 16% increase in the key 6am to 7am news hour. In contrast, Sunrise fell 4% year-on-year in the 7am to 9am timeslot. Since Lisa Wilkinson joined Today in May 2007, the program consistently defeated Sunrise in Melbourne.

On Good Friday 2009, Today defeated Sunrise for the first time in five years. Over the next four years, Today continued to make inroads on Sunrise, defeating them for a weekly win in June 2011 for the first time in seven years, and winning Sydney in 2012. However, upon Samantha Armytage's appointment as host of Sunrise in August 2013, Today's rating slipped for the next two years.

After some sizeable wins in the second half of 2015, Today managed some of its best ever ratings in early 2016. Today defeated Sunrise in 2016 based on weeks won.

After Sunrise reclaimed the ratings crown in 2017, the program's ratings slipped significantly in 2018, due to negative headlines surrounding co-host Karl Stefanovic. After Stefanovic was axed at the end of that year, the ratings for Today slipped even further in 2019, often posing record low ratings. The ratings trouble continued upon Stefanovic's return in 2020 with Today regularly beaten by both Sunrise and News Breakfast, although gradually the viewership gap has been reduced over time. In mid-September 2021, Today recorded first instance of leading viewership over Sunrise since 2018.

== Broadcasting ==
Due to the fact that Australia has more than one time zone, the show is not broadcast live to the entire nation.

Live year-round broadcasts are in New South Wales & ACT, Victoria and Tasmania.

=== Time zone changes ===
During daylight saving time, Queensland receives the show delayed by one hour. In 2007, the show began a trial and aired live into Queensland between 5:00 – 8.30am, with an extra Queensland-only half-hour. This was unsuccessful, and in 2008 the show returned to its previous delayed telecast.

The Northern Territory has Today delayed thirty minutes during winter and one-and-a-half hours during daylight saving time.

Some parts of South Australia are also delayed by thirty minutes, and in Western Australia, the program is delayed by two hours during winter and three hours during daylight saving time.

In the case of major breaking news (e.g. cyclone), the program goes live into the state to help provide residents with up-to-date information.

=== International broadcasts ===
In addition to Australia, Today is broadcast in Papua New Guinea on EMTV, and in Fiji on Fiji Television.

== See also ==
- List of Australian television series
- List of programs broadcast by Nine Network
- List of longest-running Australian television series
