= Gunduz Kalic =

Turkish theatre director

Gunduz Kalic is a theatre director, acting coach and actor especially interested in the renewal of theatre as popular gathering. Awarded the title Professor of Theatre by Bath Spa University, UK where he worked until late 2008, Kalic's career has centred on play based actor training, theatre for non-theatregoers and radical political theatre. Over five decades, he has worked in Turkey, Greece, the UK, Australia, the Netherlands, Canada and India and taught and / or collaborated with a broad range of artists - including actors, directors, poets, writers, composers, songwriters, singers, musicians, Applied Drama workers, cabaret artists, designers, painters and sculptors.

== Turkey ==
In the mid 1960s, Kalic became a founder-member of Asaf Çiğiltepe's Ankara Art Theatre (Ankara Sanat Tiyatrosu), where he appeared in a number of productions including Waiting for Godot (Godot’yu Beklerken) by Samuel Beckett, Dead Without Graves (Mezarsız Ölüler) by Jean-Paul Sartre, The Hostage (Gizli Ordu) by Brendan Behan and Dead Souls (Ölü Canlar) adapted by Arthur Adamov (from the novel by Gogol). Next, he played alongside the legendary Ulvi Uraz in the premiere and throughout the long running Istanbul 'West End' production Commotion in Moonlight (Gozlerimi Kaparım Vazifemi Yaparım) by Haldun Taner. The cast included the then young talents Zeki Alasya and Metin Akpınar. Meanwhile, Kaliç acted in a number of films including the award-winning Kanlı Döğüş. He then founded his own theatre company, Halk Oyuncuları Birliği, which was resident at the Arena Theatre in İstanbul. Members of the company included Ali Poyrazoğlu, Deniz Türkali, Celile Toyon and Mete İnsel. Kalic directed a production of Revenge of the Snakes (Yılanların öcü) adapted from the novel by Fakir Baykurt, which precipitated his departure from Turkey.

== Europe / Canada ==
After leaving Turkey, Kalic studied at the Athens Theatre and Cinema Academy and then enjoyed short internships with Jean-Louis Barrault (Theatre d l’Odeon), Giorgio Strehler (Piccolo Teatro d Milano), Eduardo De Filippo (Teatro Ca Foscari) and other prolific directors of 1960s theatre.

Kalic's involvement with the Joan Littlewood founded East 15 Acting School began when he was invited to take a role in an E15 troupe's production of Lysistrata at the first Istanbul International Theatre Festival. After moving to the UK in the late 1960s, Kalic became an instructor at E15 and subsequently Co-director of the School. As Artistic Director of the adjoining Corbett Theatre he produced some 40 plays from 1971–76, including Ears, one of the first rock musicals, and led touring companies to major summer festivals in the Netherlands, Yugoslavia, Bulgaria and France. During this period and throughout the 1970s and 80s Kalic also regularly guest directed and conducted master-classes at the Toneelacademie Maastricht, in the Netherlands.

In the late 1970s, Kalic taught and directed (in the forerunner to the current School for the Contemporary Arts) at Simon Fraser University in Vancouver, Canada, producing the work Terrorizm, about the Red Army Faction, in collaboration with the proto-punk band Active Dog.

== Australia ==
In the 1980s Kalic led the Theatre Arts programme at Northern Territory University (now Charles Darwin University) in Darwin, Australia. He was also Artistic Director of Territory North Theatre (TNT), carrying out much new play development and facilitating Theatre-as-Education work in Darwin and remote areas of the Outback.

In 1991, Kalic relocated to Queensland and launched the Australian Theatre As Education Project (TAE). Part-funded by the Commonwealth Government Priority Country Area Program and devoted to Shakespeare-in-Schools and language and human relationships education, TAE toured throughout the enormous geographical expanse of outback and provincial Queensland, conducting over 1600 performances and workshops for 48,000 parents and children. As well, at about the same time, Kalic designed and supervised the delivery of short theatre and performance based programmes for unemployed and at risk youth for Bundaberg TAFE College and a Commonwealth Government agency.

Kalic and his ensemble also developed a repertoire of popular entertainments - highly participatory theatre for adult non-theatre goers - incorporating distinctive larrikin, stand-up comedy and musical elements. These popular entertainments included adaptations of Shakespearean and Restoration classics and a series of half a dozen original intercultural works including the Australiana-derived On The Wallaby. Kaliç's version of The Taming of the Shrew, staged in a boxing ring, and other works were filmed and screened on SBS-TV's Imagine programme.

In 1993, the original political comedy/rap musical That's Twice, co-written and directed by Kalic, premiered at Australia's Parliament House in Canberra. Of this act of guerrilla theatre, the Canberra Times wrote: 'they lambasted the political powerbrokers in their own den'. A subsequent production of this play was described by one critic as 'a two-fingered riposte from Australia's forgotten people delivered with enough cartoonish energy to fuel our manufacturing industries for a year, if we had any'.

Kalic's ensemble became Taking Liberties Theatre Company, basing itself in Brisbane. Taking Liberties continued to produce popular entertainment based theatre for non-theatregoers, becoming a staple act on the club and hotel circuit in South East Queensland and beyond. Popular audiences enabled the company to survive un-subsidised in a performing arts ecology dependent on government subsidy. That's Twice lived on as a continually updated commentary on current affairs played in stand-up and conventional theatre venues, with characters from the show confronting leading politicians including the Prime Minister of Australia at public events and featuring regularly in a political satire segment on ABC's Stateline Current Affairs programme in 1996.

Through this period Kalic also penned op-ed articles on arts policy and theatricality in politics for The Australian Financial Review, The Courier-Mail (Brisbane), the Melbourne Herald Sun and the Canadian neo-situationist journal Adbusters. One of these pieces, The Death of Reality, argued that the entertainment industry was complicit in such events as the Port Arthur massacre in Australia and in the Dunblane massacre in Scotland.

== UK ==
In 2001, Kalic commenced teaching at Bath Spa University in the UK, where he founded and was Artistic Director of Full Tilt Theatre Company. Full Tilt mounted productions of his adaptations of Hamlet, Macbeth and The Comedy of Errors at an annual on campus Shakespeare-by-the-Lake event, at the Minack Theatre in Cornwall and elsewhere. The Cornish News wrote of his 2008 The Comedy of Errors: An Identity Affair: 'No errors in this vibrant show...impossible not to succumb to the total commitment, confidence and considerable charm of these many, mainly young players'. Subsequently, the show toured to parts of the United States and Canada. Kalic also created an original Bollywood Carmen after Bizet incorporating original music by Maestro of Santoor, Kiranpal Singh Deoora. Gunduz Kalic retired as Head of Department of Drama at Bath Spa University in late 2008.

== Coaching ==
Stage and screen professionals coached or taught by Gunduz Kalic or with whom he has collaborated include Zeki Alasya, Ali Poyrazoğlu, Metin Akpınar, Peter Armitage, Janine Duvitski, Alan Ford, Robert Gwilym, Jonathan Kaye, Kevin Lloyd, Christopher Ryan, Tony Scannell, Alison Steadman, Gwen Taylor, Oliver Tobias, David Yip, Heather Johansen, Mike Bradwell (founder Hull Truck Theatre and long-time Artistic Director of the Bush Theatre), Oliver Foot (founder Footsbarn Theatre Company), Hilary Westlake (founder Son and Lumiere), Andy Noble (founder Orchard Theatre Company), the late Howard Lloyd-Lewis (formerly of Manchester Library Theatre Company), Pavel Douglas, Gijs Scholten van Aschat, Hans Kesting, Joke Tjalsma, Pierre Bokma, Wivinneke van Groningen, Chris Haywood, Stephen Hyde, Monte Dwyer and Lori Dungey.

== Notes ==
Peter Billingham (ed.). 2005. Radical Initiatives in Interventionist and Community Drama. Bristol: Intellect Books.
