= Georgie Gardner =

Australian journalist (born 1970)

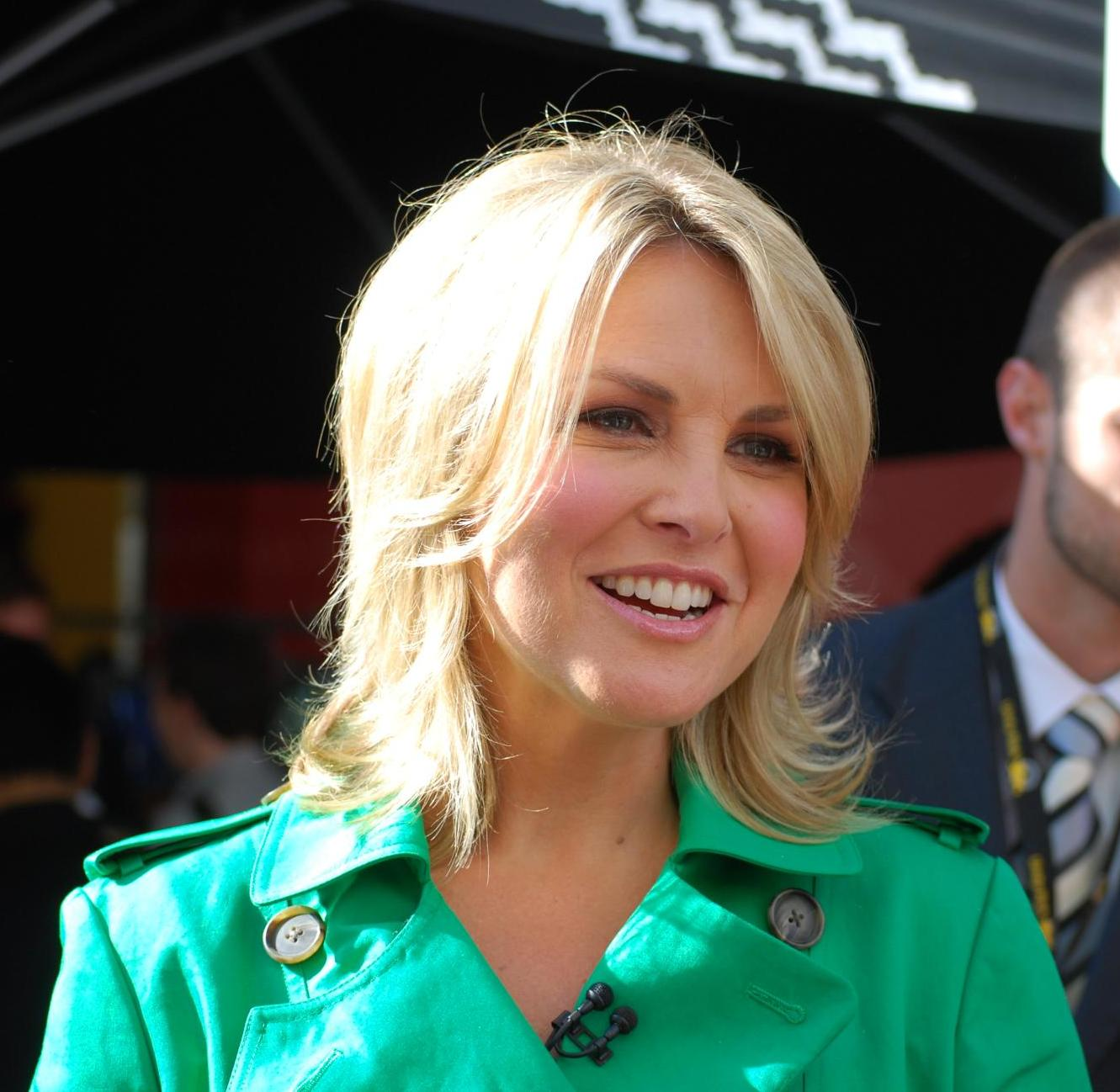
- Born: 1 June 1970 (age 56); Perth, Western Australia, Australia
- Education: Western Australian Academy of Performing Arts, St Hilda's Anglican School for Girls
- Occupations: Television presenter; journalist; news presenter
- Years active: 1993−present
- Television: Today; Nine News
- Spouse: Tim Baker (m. 2002)
- Children: 2

Georgie Gardner (born 1 June 1970) is an Australian journalist.

Gardner has previously been a presenter on Nine News Sydney, co-host and news presenter on the Nine Network's breakfast program Today.

== Early life ==
Gardner was born in Perth, Western Australia, the daughter of Preston and Ruth. Preston was a stockbroker. He died at the age of 52 from complications during oesophageal cancer surgery. Her maternal grandfather, was an accountant by trade in Perth who became a stock, station and shipping agent in the Kimberley from 1938 to 1970.

Preston and Ruth had three children, Katie, Georgie and John. When Gardner was 5, her parents divorced and subsequently remarried. She has half siblings by her mother, Beth and David, and a half brother, Richard, by her father.

Gardner attended Dalkeith Primary School and St Hilda's Anglican School for Girls in Perth. At the age of 17, she went to Milan, Italy to work as a nanny. Upon her return to Perth, she studied journalism at the Western Australian Academy of Performing Arts.

== Career ==
Gardner is the only Australian news presenter to have presented the late news bulletin on each of the three major commercial TV networks, having filled in as presenter of the Ten Late News, as full-time presenter of Seven Late News, and as a substitute presenter of Nightline, the late night version of Nine News.

Gardner has previously been a fill-in presenter for Sonia Kruger on Today Extra.

On 3 October 2007, Gardner was unable to continue reading the news bulletins due to the death of former West Coast Eagles star Chris Mainwaring, whose wife Rani, who lived in Perth, was a close friend of Gardner.

=== Radio ===
After completing her studies, in 1992, Gardner obtained a radio cadetship at Radio 2NX (now hit106.9 Newcastle) in Newcastle, New South Wales. In 1994, she moved to Sydney to read the news at 2Day FM.

=== Network Ten ===
In 1996, she joined the Network Ten as a television news reporter and fill-in presenter.

=== Seven Network ===
In 1998, Gardner moved to the Seven Network as a reporter and presenter of the late night news, eventually becoming co-host of Seven News Sunrise, which she presented with Mark Beretta from 2000 until 2002. She held this position for two years before acting as a fill-in presenter for Seven News and Sky News Australia. She went on to cohost the network’s early morning Sunrise program for two years.

=== Nine Network ===
Gardner joined the Nine Network in July 2002 to present weather on Nine News in Sydney, and to host afternoon updates. In 2004, the Nine Network added a semi-national news bulletin at 4:30 pm, National Nine News Afternoon Edition, for which Gardner was the original presenter.

In 2006, Gardner replaced Leila McKinnon as presenter of National Nine News Morning Edition.

In December 2006, she replaced Sharyn Ghidella as news presenter on Today, when Ghidella resigned and switched to the Seven Network to present Seven News in Brisbane. Gardner took six months maternity leave in 2007 and returned to Today on Monday 6 August 2007, Allison Langdon having filled the on-air role while Gardner was on maternity leave.

In July 2009, Gardner was appointed Nine News Sydney weekend presenter, replacing Mark Ferguson after he signed with the Seven Network.

On 26 May 2014, Gardner announced on Today that she would be leaving the show to spend more time with family while continuing with the Nine Network on Nine News and occasional reporting for 60 Minutes. Gardner's final appearance on Today, on Friday 6 June 2014, attracted the program's highest ratings for some time: 359,000 viewers according to Oztam figures accessed from the web blog TV Tonight. This was seen by some as a respectful way to farewell the "elegant", "gracious" personality. Gardner was replaced by Nine News reporter Sylvia Jeffreys.

On 23 November 2017, it was confirmed that Gardner was to co-host Today on the Nine Network after Lisa Wilkinson left due to a salary dispute. She replaced Deborah Knight, who had been hosting Today since Wilkinson left the Nine Network. Her first appearance as new host was on 22 January 2018.

In November 2019, the Nine Network announced that Gardner would no longer co-host Today effective immediately; she would return to presenting Nine News Sydney on Fridays and Saturdays. Karl Stefanovic later returned to the show as co-host alongside Weekend Today co-host and 60 Minutes reporter Allison Langdon from January 2020.

On 13 March 2026, Gardner announced her resignation after more than 20 years with the Nine Network. She presented her final bulletin on 17 April 2026.
