= Monte Dwyer =

Author, musician, journalist

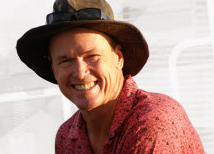
- Born: 21 July 1958 (age 68); Newcastle, New South Wales
- Occupations: Journalist; presenter; musician; author; producer
- Known for: Former weather presenter on Today (1991-2002)
- Spouse: Loloma Roberts (m. 2014)
- Website: http://www.monte.com.au

Monte Dwyer (born 21 July 1958) is an Australian journalist, TV personality, musician and author, best known as the weatherman who pioneered the traveling weatherman blueprint for Channel Nine's Today Australia during the 1990s, also voted Australia's favourite weatherman for over 15 years.

== Early and personal life ==
Dwyer was born in Newcastle, New South Wales on 21 July 1958, and educated in and around Lake Macquarie. After leaving school, he trained as a psychiatric nurse at Morisset Hospital, then began traveling and worked variously as a professional fisherman, fashion model, foreign aid worker abroad and hospitality industry journeyman.

Married to Julie Brooker in 1996 but divorced in 1999. In July 1997, his daughter Lucy was born. In 2014, Monte married high school sweetheart Loloma Roberts (now Dwyer) and currently resides in Lake Macquarie.

== Arts and media career ==
In the late 1980s, Monte trained in Theatre Arts in Darwin, Northern Territory under Gündüz Kaliç, then began presenting the nightly weather on Darwin's local ABC station, gaining notoriety for his theatrical presentations which included singing, rapping and race-calling the weather. During this time, he was a columnist for the NT News and hosted various ABC Radio Darwin programs, including Breakfast, Drive & Afternoons.

In 1991, he moved to Sydney and became the weather presenter on Today Australia on Channel Nine taking over from Brian Bury. He left in 2002.

In 2007, Dwyer produced content for Charles Wooley's radio program Across Australia while travelling around Australia in a motorhome. In 2008, he was in one season of Postcards From the Bush for Channel Seven's Sunrise.

After leaving the program, Dwyer began to produce video stories and travelogues for clients including Tourism Australia and Australia Network. He also self-publishes/produces books & DVDs under the Red in the Centre brand, and turns out the occasional CD of original music.

== Literature ==
Dwyer has written eight books:

- Slapped by an Angel, co-author Kym Crosbie (2006, ISBN 978-0-646-47069-6)
- Red in the Centre: The Australian Bush Through Urban Eyes (2008, ISBN 978-0-646-49296-4)
- Red in the Centre: Through a Crooked Lens (2010, ISBN 978-0-646-52740-6)
- Red in the Centre: Looking for the H Chord (2011, ISBN 978-0-646-55386-3)
- Red in the Centre: The Nomads at Large (2013, ISBN 978-0-9872568-1-2)
- The Means (2014, ISBN 978-0-9872568-3-6)
- The Egg Collector (2016, ISBN 978-0-9872568-4-3)
- Struberville - Consequences of Isolation (2017, ISBN 978-0-9872568-6-7)

== Plays ==
- I Would've Written, (Australian National Playwrights Conference, 1989)
- Son, (Australian National Playwright's Conference, 1990
