= Michael Atkinson (presenter) =

Australian sports presenter and journalist

- Born: Australia
- Occupations: Sport journalist, broadcaster
- Employer: Nine Network
- Known for: Today as sports reporter
- Spouse: Sophie Smith

Michael Atkinson is an Australian sports presenter, broadcaster, and journalist.

Atkinson is currently sports presenter on the Nine Network's breakfast program Today. and co-host of Weekend Today.

He is known for his work with Stan Sport and Nine News Queensland, and has covered rugby, netball, tennis, and a broad range of Australian and international sporting events.

== Career ==
=== Early career ===
Atkinson worked in professional rugby as a team manager for the Queensland Reds, prior to his brooaadcasting and media career. After his time with the Reds, he lived in London, where he worked in the finance sector.

=== Sports broadcasting: Nine Network and Stan ===
Atkinson joined Nine News Queensland, working across both the Brisbane and Gold Coast bureaus as a sports reporter and presenter. He also contributed to Nine's Wide World of Sports, including coverage of Suncorp Super Netball and the Brisbane International tennis tournament.

In February 2026, Atkinson was appointed as co‑host of Weekend Today. He had regularly filled in during the 2025–26 summer period prior to his appointment.

In October 2026, Atkinson was appointed sports presenter on Today, replacing Danika Mason. He will continue hosting Weekend Today until the end of the year and will also continue his rugby union hosting duties alongside Today in 2027.

He later became a presenter and broadcaster for Stan Sport, covering major rugby competitions and producing commentary, analysis, and feature content.

=== Other ===
Michael has also written sports opinion columns for the Brisbane Times.

In 2025, Atkinson appeared on the Built in the Bush podcast, discussing his career path from rural Queensland to national sports broadcasting.

== Personal life ==
Atkinson grew up in Quilpie, a small town in western Queensland. He later attended Marist College Ashgrove as a boarding student.

Atkinson is married to Sophie Smith, and they have three children.
