= Jayne Azzopardi =

Australian television personality

- Born: 8 November 1980 (age 45–46)
- Education: Caringbah High School; University of Technology Sydney
- Occupations: Television presenter, news reporter & journalist
- Years active: 2009–present
- Employer: Nine Network
- Television: Today

Jayne Azzopardi (born 8 November 1980) is an Australian television presenter, reporter and journalist. Azzopardi is currently a news presenter of Nine Network's breakfast program Today. She has previously been a co-host and news presenter of Weekend Today and reporter for Nine News Sydney.

== Media career ==
After she studied journalism at the University of Technology in Sydney, Azzopardi started her career as a journalist at WIN News located in Wagga Wagga. After this she worked at some international news organisations including ITN, BBC, CNBC & Al Jazeera.

In 2009 Azzopardi joined Nine News as a political journalist based in Canberra, where she covered two elections and three leadership changes.

In 2011, she moved to the Sydney newsroom to report on breaking news stories across Australia and around the world, from natural disasters to Hollywood red carpets and royal tours.

In addition to her reporting duties, Azzopardi has hosted Talking Married on Nine Network's sister channel, 9Life.

In December 2015, it was announced that Azzopardi would replace Wendy Kingston as the news presenter for Weekend Today. In April 2023, she was announced as co-host of the programme alongside Clint Stanaway.

In July 2024, Azzopardi was appointed as the news presenter on Today, replacing Brooke Boney.

== Personal life ==
Azzopardi attended Caringbah High School in the south of Sydney and later studied journalism at the University of Technology Sydney.

On 31 March 2018, Azzopardi married Trent Butler at Glen Albyn Estate in Tasmania. On 4 February 2020, she gave birth to her first child named Joey. The family resides in Sydney.
