= Alex Cullen (journalist) =

Australian journalist

- Born: 28 November 1980 (age 45); Dubbo, New South Wales
- Education: Coonamble High School; St Ignatius' College, Riverview; Charles Sturt University
- Occupations: Journalist, TV and radio presenter
- Years active: 2003–2025, 2025–present
- Employer: Seven Network
- Spouse: Bonnie Campbell (m. 2017)
- Children: 3

Alex Cullen (born 28 November 1980) is an Australian journalist and television presenter.

Cullen was previously sport presenter of the Nine Network's breakfast program Today.

== Early life ==
Cullen was born in Dubbo, New South Wales, and grew up on a farm in Coonamble. He attended Coonamble High School, and then Saint Ignatius' College, Riverview, before going on to complete a journalism degree at Charles Sturt University.

== Career ==
In early 2003, Cullen began working as a reporter for Prime News in Wagga Wagga. He then moved to Western Australia becoming a reporter for Golden West News in Kalgoorlie and then Bunbury, where he also became GWN7's sports presenter. He then began working for Seven News in Perth in 2006 as a general reporter, before moving to be on Sunrise in 2007. Six months later, Cullen returned to the screen as a general reporter for Seven News.

Cullen was appointed weekend sports presenter in late 2007, before becoming weeknight sports presenter in January 2009 after Matt White left the position to host Today Tonight.

In addition to working with Seven Network, Cullen has worked for ABC Local Radio, 2BS, B-Rock FM and 2GB.

In April 2010, Cullen was promoted to reporter of Seven's Sunday Night public affairs program, with Tony Squires replacing him as weeknight sport presenter on Seven News Sydney.

In November 2019, it was announced that Cullen would join the Nine Network after the Seven Network axed Sunday Night. It was later announced that Alex would join the Nine Network and would fill in on Today over the summer period.

In December 2019, the Nine Network announced that Cullen would join Today as sport presenter from January 2020 replacing Tony Jones.

In March 2020, Cullen replaced Tracy Vo as news presenter, as Vo returned to Perth due to the COVID-19 pandemic.

In January 2023, Brooke Boney replaced Cullen as news presenter on Today taking on news and entertainment with Alex focusing on sport.

In January 2025, Cullen was stood down from the Nine Network after accepting a $50,000 gift from Adrian Portelli for referring to him as 'McLaren Guy' during a broadcast, Cullen and the network parted ways a week later.

On 19 June 2025, it was announced that Cullen would be joining The Christian O'Connell Show on Gold 104.3 as the show's resident sport guru and Jack Post's replacement.

In July 2025, the Seven Network announced that Cullen would return to the network in a new role within its news division. In September 2025, it was confirmed that Cullen would present 7NEWS with Alex Cullen. The short bulletins air weekdays from 1:00 pm to 3:00 pm, scheduled between the network’s game show programming.

In June 2026, Cullen resigned from The Christian O'Connell Show to spend more time with his family. He said he had made the decision after a year of balancing the breakfast radio role with his television commitments while raising three young children.

== Personal life ==
In February 2021, Cullen announced that wife Bonnie was expecting their third child in August. They had a son born on 16 August.

Cullen is an ambassador for the Charlie Teo Foundation.
