= Brooke Boney =

Australian journalist

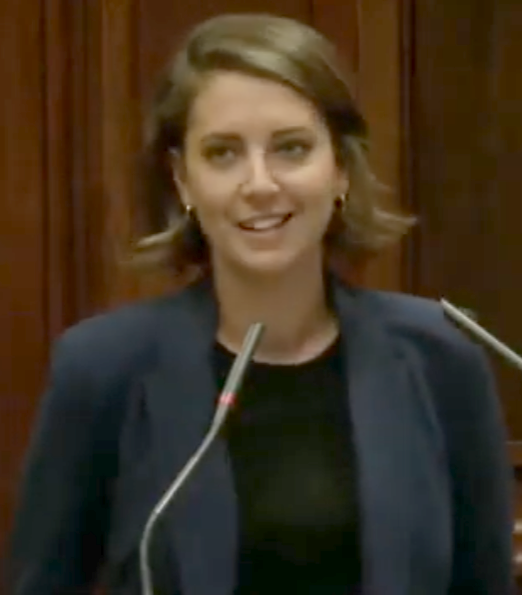
- At an ANU panel discussion in 2018
- Born: 1987 or 1988 (age 38–39)
- Education: University of Technology Sydney
- Occupations: Journalist, TV presenter, Entertainment reporter
- Years active: 2011–present

Brooke Kathleen Boney (born 1987 or 1988) is an Australian journalist and television presenter of Aboriginal Gamilaroi descent.

Boney has previously been a news and entertainment presenter of Nine Network's breakfast program Today and newsreader on the ABC's radio network Triple J.

== Early life and education ==
Boney was born in 1987 in Muswellbrook, New South Wales, the eldest of six children. She is a Gamilaroi woman. She worked as a volunteer in community radio while at high school. She has also undertaken an advertising cadetship at the Australian Financial Review. After entering as a mature age student, Boney graduated from University of Technology Sydney with a Bachelor of Communication (Journalism) in 2014.

== Career ==
While studying for her degree, Boney produced the Blackchat program on Sydney's Koori Radio before morning lectures, and did an internship at the Australian Broadcasting Corporation in the afternoons. Before graduating, she was appointed as a political correspondent for NITV, based at Parliament House from 2013. Her first assignments had to cover the March 2013 Australian Labor Party leadership spill and the federal election that followed.

She worked as a newsreader on the ABC's radio network Triple J from 2016 to 2018, and became known for using the traditional Gamilaroi greeting of "Yaama" when introducing herself at the start of Triple J's news bulletin.

In December 2018, it was announced that Boney had been appointed as entertainment reporter on the Nine Network's breakfast program Today, to work alongside the network's long-serving entertainment editor Richard Wilkins in 2019.

In January 2019, just days into her new job, she was asked for her opinion on Change the Date, a campaign which proposes moving Australia Day from its current date, which marks the date of the arrival of the First Fleet in Sydney. She replied:

This is the best country in the world, no doubt. But I can't separate the 26th of January from the fact that my brothers are more likely to go to jail than they are to go to school, or that my little sisters and my mum are more likely to be beaten and raped than anyone else's sisters and mum, and that started from that day.

This prompted a harsh backlash, mixed reactions from some viewers, and much commentary in the media.

In February 2021, Southern Cross Austereo announced that Boney and Linda Marigliano would host The Dream Club podcast on LiSTNR. The podcast is a weekly social commentary and pop culture reviews on internet culture.

In November 2021, Boney won Nine Network's Lego Masters: Bricksmas specials.

In December 2022, Nine announced that Boney will host Carols by Candlelight with David Campbell.

In January 2023, Boney replaced Alex Cullen as news presenter on Today taking on news and entertainment with Cullen focusing on sport.

In April 2023, Boney filled in on Will & Woody on the KIIS Network whilst Woody Whitelaw competed in I'm a Celebrity...Get Me Out of Here!.

In March 2024, Boney announced her resignation from the Nine Network to take up an opportunity to study at Oxford University. She finished up with the network after the 2024 Summer Olympics.

== Other roles ==
Boney is a spokesperson for the GO Foundation, which focuses on education for Indigenous Australians.

A portrait of Boney and her pet pug Jimmy by Laura Jones was a finalist for the 2022 Archibald Prize.
