= Brian Bury =

Australian television and radio presenter

- Born: Brian Frederick Bury; 14 June 1937 (age 89)
- Occupations: Television and radio personality, weather presenter
- Known for: Weather presenter on Today (1982–1990)

Brian Frederick Bury (/ˈbjuːriː/ BYOO-ree; born 14 June 1937) is an Australian former radio and television personality and weather presenter, best known for his tenure on the Nine Network's breakfast show Today as weathermen from the program's inception in 1982 until 1990. He subsequently went into radio before retiring in 2003

== Career ==
Bury begain his career in radio broadcasting before the move into television. He approached television executive Bruce Gyngell in a car park during a chance encounter in Sydney, in an attempt to gain employment. Bury was subsequently hired as a booth announcer on Channel 9. His first job was to introduce a religious program called I Challenge The Minister hosted by Sir Alan Walker.

Bury is best known for being the original Today weather presenter. With his unique delivery of the weather forecasts and his colourful outfits, his quirky nature ensured he became one of the network's most popular stars. However, Bury claims Channel 9 management had difficulty accepting his style, preferring a more traditional and serious approach to delivering the weather reports. This was despite Bury regularly receiving positive feedback from viewers.

Bury often filled in for Mike Walsh on the network's lunchtime variety program, The Mike Walsh Show. He lists Harry Secombe as his favourite guest, and lists Eartha Kitt as his least favourite guest due to an incident when Kitt punched him in the breastbone.

After more than 30 years with the station, Channel 9 fired Bury. In a 2015 interview, Bury admits he was "hurt" by the decision. After his time at Channel 9, Bury had stints at both Channel 7 and Ten before he relocated to South East Queensland where he returned to radio, hosting an afternoon show on Brisbane's 4BC, which he did up until his retirement in 2003.

== Personal life ==
Bury is married to his wife Margaret, whom he originally met on a blind date. They married in 1962 and have two adult children Ann and Matthew, and a number of grandchildren.

In 2015, their granddaughter Natasha took her own life at the age of 15. Bury said the tragedy brought their entire family closer and made them realise they needed to live life while enjoying every moment. Bury said in a 2015 interview that his son and his friends were forming a foundation to undertake research into why young people take their own lives. Bury's son Matt subsequently established the SQUAD Foundation with the aim of preventing other families going through the pain of losing a family member to suicide.

In 2009, Bury suffered a two-metre fall while presenting at the inaugural Gold Coast Area Theatre Awards at the Gold Coast Arts Centre where he fell from the stage into the audience. He was uninjured and joked that he would do anything for attention, before continuing his hosting duties.
