= Deborah Knight =

Australian news presenter

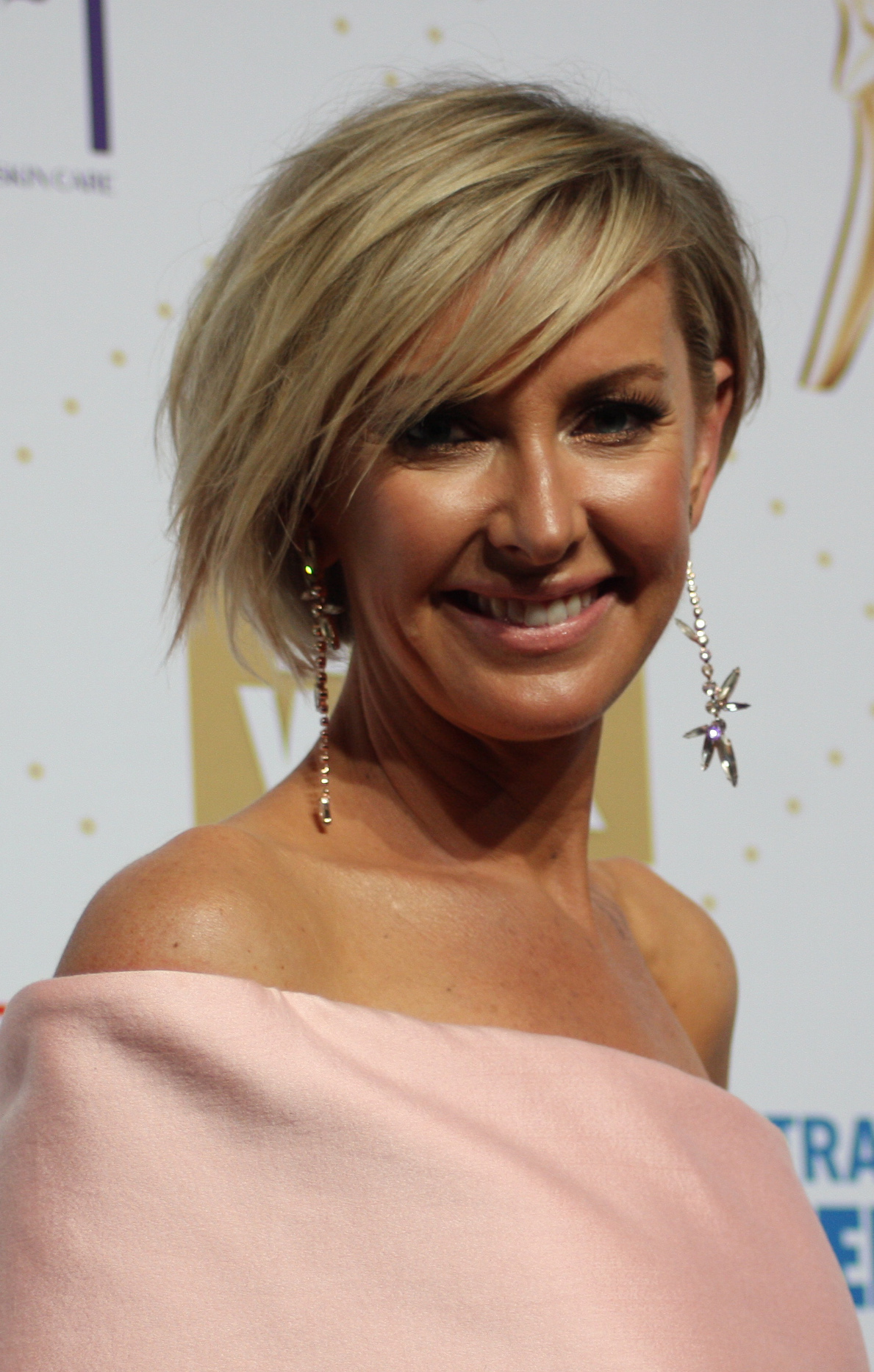
- Knight in 2016
- Born: 23 November 1972 (age 53); Coffs Harbour, New South Wales Australia
- Occupations: Television presenter; news presenter; radio host; journalist
- Years active: 1992–present
- Employer: Nine Network
- Television: A Current Affair (Saturday)
- Spouse: Lindsay Dunbar (m. 2005)
- Children: 3

Deborah Knight (born 23 November 1972) is an Australian television and news presenter, radio host, and journalist.

Knight is currently presenter of Nine News Morning and Nine News Afternoon in Sydney and host of A Current Affair on Saturday. Previously she has been host of Money News on Nine Radio, afternoons host on 2GB, co-host of the Nine Network's breakfast program Today and presented Nine News Sydney on Friday and Saturday.

== Biography ==
=== Early life and career ===
Knight studied at Charles Sturt University in Bathurst, New South Wales, where she earned a degree in journalism, graduating in 1993.

She began her career in the media working for the radio station 2WG in Wagga Wagga and then moved to Mix 106.5 in Sydney before accepting a position with the Australian Broadcasting Corporation.

=== Network 10 ===
Later on, she moved to Network 10 and in 2001 was appointed the US correspondent on 10 News First, during which she covered major world events such as the September 11 attacks. Upon her return to Australia, she became co-host of the flagship Sydney bulletin in January 2006, replacing Jessica Rowe, and a regular substitute presenter on the network's national late-night news bulletin.

In October 2011, Knight was replaced by Sandra Sully as the presenter of Network Ten's Ten News at Five in Sydney.

=== Nine Network ===
In December 2011, Knight joined the Nine Network, replacing Alicia Gorey as news presenter on Weekend Today and Monday news presenter on Today.

In February 2015, Knight was appointed co-host of Weekend Today, replacing Leila McKinnon.

In December 2017, Knight was appointed as presenter of Nine News Sydney on Friday and Saturday nights, replacing Georgie Gardner who replaced Lisa Wilkinson on Today. It was also announced that Allison Langdon would replace Knight on Weekend Today.

Knight has been a fill in presenter on Today, Today Extra, A Current Affair and Nine News Sydney.

In January 2019, Knight was confirmed as the new co-host of the Nine Network's breakfast program Today, replacing Karl Stefanovic.

In November 2019, the Nine Network announced that Knight will be replaced as co-host of Today with Karl Stefanovic returning to the show as co-host alongside Weekend Today co-host and 60 Minutes reporter Allison Langdon from January 2020.

In December 2019, it was announced that Knight will replace Steve Price to host Afternoons on 2GB from 13 January 2020.

In November 2023, Knight announced that she would be stepping down as host of Afternoons on 2GB and in 2024 will host Money News across the Nine Radio network.

In July 2025, the Nine Network announced that Knight will return to a full-time television role within its news division, taking over as presenter of Nine News Morning and Nine News Afternoon in Sydney. She will step down from her role as host of Money News.

== Personal life ==
Knight is married and has three children.
