= Charles Croucher =

Australian journalist

- Born: 1989 (age 36–37)
- Education: Charles Sturt University
- Occupation: journalist
- Known for: being the Nine Network's chief political editor
- Television: Nine News, Weekend Today

Charles Croucher is an Australian journalist.

He is currently the Nine Network's chief political editor, a position he was appointed to in October 2022.

== Early life and career ==
He grew up in Branxton, New South Wales. He attended Hunter Valley Grammar School, graduating in 2005.

He studied a Bachelor of Sport Studies/Bachelor of Communication (Journalism) double degree at Charles Sturt University, where he graduated in 2009.

While he was at university, he found employment with Bathurst radio stations 2BS and B-Rock where he worked as a news presenter, before becoming the host of a weekend breakfast show and then the presenter of the weekday morning program.

In 2009, Croucher was a finalist in the "Best News Presenter (Country)" category at the Australian Commercial Radio Awards but lost to Lois Chislett from 3YB in Warrnambool, Victoria.

== Television career ==
In 2010, Croucher began his long association with the Nine Network in Darwin when he was appointed a sports reporter for Nine News Darwin where he also became a weekend news presenter.

In 2012, he moved to Melbourne to work as a reporter for A Current Affair before relocating to Canberra in 2013 upon being appointed a politics reporter based at Parliament House.

From 2018 to 2020, Croucher was Nine's Los Angeles-based US correspondent before returning to Australia to become a co-host of Weekend Today in 2020.

In October 2022, it was announced he would succeed Chris Uhlmann as the Nine Network's political editor.

As Nine's political editor, Croucher regularly provides commentary in a regular segment on RN Breakfast, where he discusses political news with Patricia Karvelas on ABC Radio National.

=== National Press Club incident ===
Following a National Press Club address in October 2022, Croucher asked Federal Treasurer Jim Chalmers whether the Australian Labor Party's promise to cut electricity bills by $275 had been included in the Federal Budget, Chalmers mistakenly claimed: "Yep, it's in the Budget". However, Chalmers later claimed to have misheard the question, phoning Croucher to confess his mistake, and correcting the record in the House of Representatives.

When pressed on the issue during Question Time by Angus Taylor, he stated: "I was temporarily blinded by the vast influence of Charles Croucher who has inherited this remarkable position of power from Laurie Oakes and Chris Uhlmann and I say, as I said to Charles who I rang straight after the press club, I rang Charles and I rang Laura Tingle and I said I thought you were asking me a different question, I misheard it and I answered a different question and so I say again to Charles, who is in the gallery through you, Mr Speaker, I misheard his question and I am generally grateful for once to the member for Hume for the opportunity to talk about this.

The incident was widely reported and commentated on in the media. Chalmers was criticised for his explanation by 2GB host Ben Fordham who doubted that he had misheard Croucher's question.
