= Richard Wilkins (TV presenter) =

New Zealand-Australian television presenter

Richard Wilkins AM
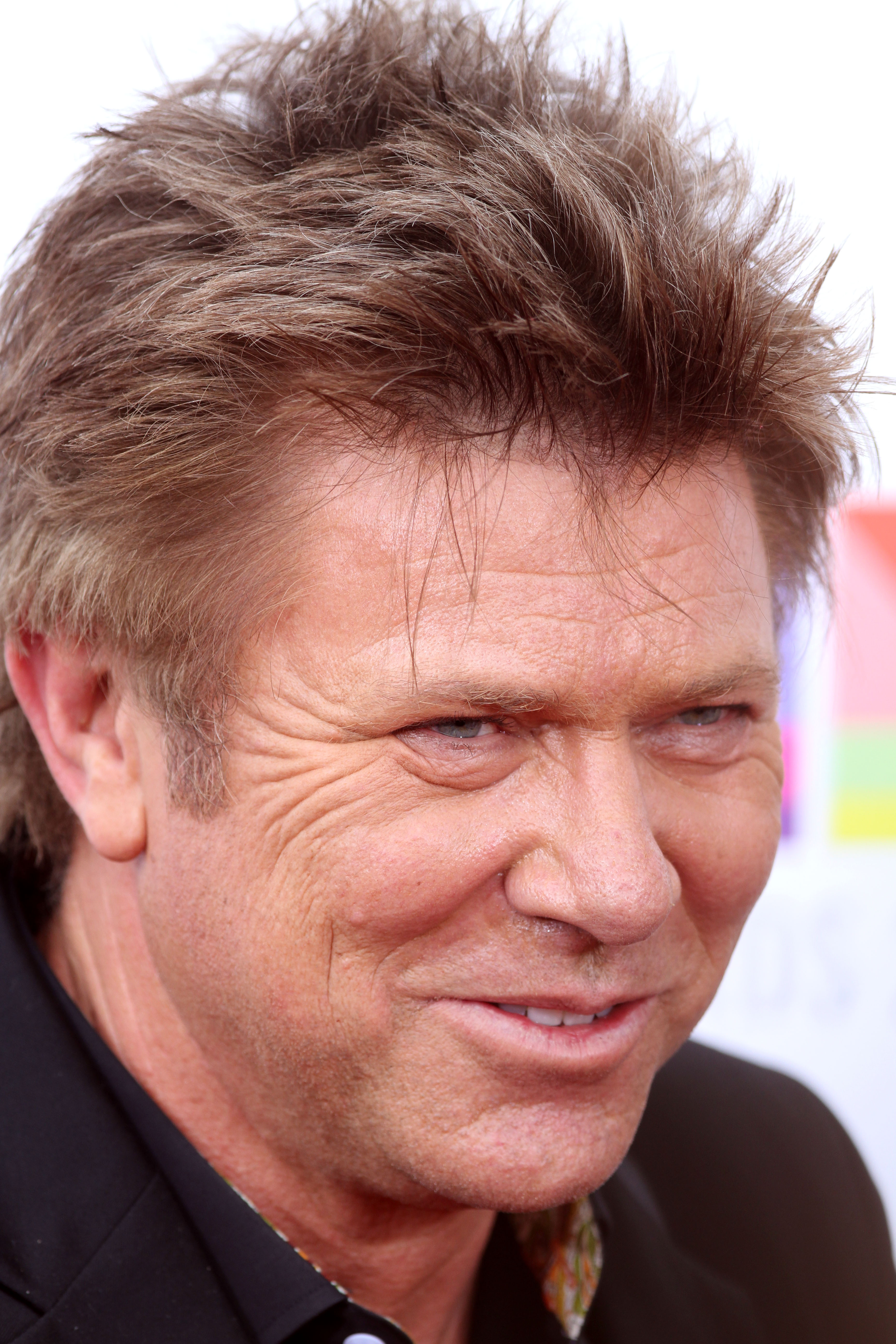
- Wilkins at the 2014 ARIA Music Awards, Sydney, 26 November 2014
- Born: 19 June 1954 (age 72); Auckland, New Zealand
- Other names: Richard Wilde, Dickie
- Citizenship: Australia; New Zealand
- Occupations: Television presenter; radio presenter; entertainment reporter
- Years active: 1987–present
- Employer: Nine Network
- Television: Today; Weekend Today; Today Extra
- Partner(s): Rebecca Gibney (late 1980s); Collette Dinnigan (early 1990s–1994)
- Children: 5 (including Christian Wilkins)

Richard Stephen Wilkins AM (born 19 June 1954) is a New Zealand–born Australian television and radio presenter. He is the entertainment editor for the Nine Network and weekend announcer on smoothfm.

== Early life and music career ==
Wilkins was born in New Zealand on 19 June 1954, where he graduated from teachers' college, majoring in English and music. Using the name "Richard Wilde", he became an aspiring pop singer. PolyGram signed him to a worldwide deal.

In 1980, he brought his band Wilde And Reckless to Australia. He released some singles and a six-track EP, and toured with Grace Jones. He left the music industry to work behind the scenes as Promotions and Marketing Manager for Sydney radio stations 2Day FM and 2UW. He was part of the Australian Olympians' group which released the top-30 single "You're Not Alone".

In 2006, he returned to the stage for his role as Vince Fontaine in the mega-production "Grease: the Arena Spectacular".

== Television and radio career ==
Along with Joy Smithers and Alison Drower, Wilkins was the original host of MTV Australia when it launched on Nine in 1987.

In 1992, he hosted a game show called Keynotes, a summertime replacement for Sale of the Century. In 1999 he hosted the Australian version of Entertainment Tonight with Marie Patane. For ten consecutive years (excluding 1999–2000), he hosted the Sydney New Year's Eve fireworks telecast. On 7 July 2007, Wilkins presented at the Australian leg of the Live Earth concert.

Wilkins has been the Nine's Network's Entertainment editor and presented daily features and interviews from across the entertainment industry and around the world. In this role, he became a regular on‑air contributor to Today throughout the 2000s, delivering entertainment segments and conducting interviews for the program. He has also fronted the Nine Network’s coverage of major events including the The Academy Awards, The Golden Globe Awards, ARIA Awards and many other special events.

Reporting live on the deaths of Farrah Fawcett and Michael Jackson on 26 June 2009, Wilkins erroneously reported the death of actor Jeff Goldblum on Today, although later in the program this was verified as a hoax.

In September 2011, he released his autobiography Black Ties, Red Carpets, Green Rooms, co-written with Carrie Hutchinson.

In May 2012, Wilkins joined smoothfm and currently hosts Weekend Mornings (10am–1pm) on smoothfm 91.5 Melbourne and smoothfm 95.3 Sydney.

In 2019, Wilkins co-hosted Today Extra on Wednesday and Thursday due to David Campbell hosting Weekend Today. In 2020, Wilkins replaced David Campbell as co-host of Weekend Today and remained in that role through 2022.

=== 30th anniversary ===
In 2017, Wilkins celebrated his 30th anniversary with the Nine Network. In January 2017, for the twelfth time, Wilkins co-hosted the annual G'Day USA Gala – the annual Australian event in the United States, at the behest of Foreign Minister Julie Bishop. In November 2017, Wilkins returned to host the ARIA awards from The Star in Sydney for the Nine Network.

=== Target of fake ad scams ===
In November 2023, Australia's ABC News reported that Wilkins' fake images are "regularly" being misused by scamsters on social media, as well as on news and entertainment websites.

Recurring Feuds

Wilkins has experienced several run ins with Melbourne resident Fraser Harvey, and its believed the two have been feuding for years ignited by Harvey's tendency to park his Hyundai Sonata across Wilkins' driveway; a point strenuously denied by Harvey.

In May of 2026 it was revealed that Harvey had set up a phishing scam with the sole purpose of gaining access to Wilkins Uber Eats account. Harvey noted that Wilkins fell in love with his online persona unusually quickly, despite not trying to be romantic and sporting the username 'HonkyTonkHobo44'. It is alleged that Harvey then used the newly accessed superannuation funds to purchase a prototype hovercraft that was built privately on the Gold Coast. Harvey states the hovercraft never materialised, and the seller disappeared once the funds had been received. Harvey maintains he is still owed one hovercraft by Wilkins.

== Honours ==
Wilkins was presented with the Variety Club's "Heart of Variety" Award in 2000 for his outstanding humanitarian efforts.

In the 2014 Queen's Birthday Honours List, Wilkins was appointed a Member of the Order of Australia (AM), for "significant service to the community through a range of charities, and to the entertainment industry".

Wilkins has won two Australian Commercial Radio Awards for Best Music Special: for John Farnham and Michael Buble.

== Personal life ==
Wilkins also holds dual New Zealand and Australian citizenship.

Wilkins has five children to four different mothers. His eldest child has Down syndrome and was born in New Zealand when Wilkins was 18 years old and the mother was 16 years old. Wilkins has spoken about his difficulty trying to raise a child with Down syndrome at such a young age. Wilkins' son, Christian, is a model and actor. His youngest child, a daughter, is with fashion designer Collette Dinnigan, whom he dated in the early 2000s before breaking up in 2004.

Wilkins dated television actress Rebecca Gibney in the late 1980s. They broke up when Gibney discovered that he was cheating on her with a flight attendant, who he subsequently ended up marrying. Despite this, Gibney holds no hard feelings towards him.

Wilkins tested positive to COVID-19 on 12 March 2020, in the early stages of the COVID-19 pandemic in Australia. Five days earlier, he had been in contact with Rita Wilson, one of the first known celebrities to contract the coronavirus.
