= 9StreamLIVE =

- Starring: Robert McKnight
- Country of origin: Australia
- Original language: English
- No. of series: 2
- No. of episodes: 14

Production
- Executive producer: Robert McKnight
- Production locations: Sydney, Australia
- Running time: 60 mins

Original release
- Network: NineMSN; YouTube (Season 2)
- Release: 29 January – 28 May 2013

Related
- Nine News

9StreamLIVE was a panel television program produced by Nine News that was streamed exclusively online. It was hosted by Rob McKnight. It was a spin-off of previous Nine News live streams and behind the scenes videos uploaded to YouTube.

== Format ==
The show consisted of Rob McKnight (who hosted the show) and three other panel guests (usually Nine News reporters/presenters or journalists). McKnight introduced news stories and asks for opinion from the panel members. McKnight also encouraged viewers to share their opinion via social media (which was shown on a ticker and some selected feedback was read on air).

== Segments ==
There were a number of regular segments:

- Clip of the Week- Showed a funny or interesting clip sourced from the Internet.
- Trending on Twitter- Showed the top 5 trending Twitter topics.
- NineMSN Top 5- Showed the current top 5 most popular NineMSN articles.
- ARIA Chart- Played portions of music videos that were in the top 5 on the ARIA Singles Chart.
- Top 5 Box Office Countdown- Played portions of the top five grossing films on the Australian Box Office
- Backend Quickies- Done towards the end of the show. McKnight quickly introduced a number of news stories and asked the panel for opinions.

== Series overview ==
9StreamLIVE began on Tuesday January 29, 2013 at 7:30pm AEDT. Two weeks later the show moved to the new time slot of 8pm AEDT (to accommodate other studio productions). Season One ran for 8 episodes with the final episode of the season airing Tuesday March 16. The first episode of the second season was originally intended to air on April 16 but was cancelled due to studio unavailability as a result of the Boston Marathon bombing.

The final episode aired on 28 May 2013. The show did not return the next week as McKnight was preparing to move to Network Ten to executive produce the mid-morning talk show Studio 10.

== Episode list ==
Season	Episodes	Originally aired	
Season	Episodes	Season premiere	Season finale
1	8	January 29, 2013	March 16, 2013
2	6	April 23, 2013	May 28, 2013

== Contributors ==
Each week Rob was joined by three different panelists. Throughout the duration of the series many of the guests were from the Nine Network, and various Comedians and Newspaper Columnists. A full list of those who appeared on 9StreamLIVE are listed below:

Name	Appeared In
Peter Overton	S01E01, S01E06 & S02E03
Caroline Overington	S01E01
Dan Ilic	S01E01
Peter Hitchener	S01E01
Melissa Downes	S01E01
Ken Sutcliffe	S01E02
David Campbell	S01E02
Sarrah Le Marquand	S01E02, S01E07 & S02E05
Steve Molk	S01E02 & S02E02
Trevor Long	S01E02, S02E01 & S02E02
Tom Steinfort	S01E03, S01E08 & S02E06
Sarah Harris	S01E03 & S01E06
Jonathon Moran	S01E03 & S02E04
Dan Barrett	S01E03 & S02E03
Ben Fordham	S01E04
Elle Halliwell	S01E04 & S02E06
Kevin Wilde	S01E04
Pete Smith	S01E04
Amelia Adams	S01E05
Wendy Kingston	S01E05
Steele Saunders	S01E05, S02E01 & S02E03
Jason Morrison	S01E05 & S02E04
James Manning	S01E05
Peter Harvey (Tribute)	S01E06
John Westacott	S01E06
Paul Bongiorno	S01E06
Brett McLeod	S01E07, S02E01 & S02E05
Andrew Jaffrey	S01E07
Allison Langdon	S01E08
Jessica Irvine	S01E08
Lucy Chesterton	S01E07, S01E08, S02E03 & S02E05
Deborah Knight	S02E01
Mike Dalton	S02E01
Phil Jacob	S02E01
Andrew Lofthouse	S02E02
Mary Collier	S02E02
Yvonne Sampson	S02E02
Joel Dry	S02E02
Caroline Marcus	S02E03
Tim Burrowes	S02E03
Amber Sherlock	S02E04
Dean Nye	S02E04
Sylvia Jeffreys	S02E05
Phil Baildon	S02E05
Chloe Bugelly	S02E05
Ben McCormack	S02E06
Richard Lyle	S02E06

== Special events ==
Prior to the live stream on February 19, 2013, the studio output was switched out live 30 minutes before the show allowing the audience to watch Rob and the guests prepare and rehearse the show. This "pre-show" was never included in the complete episode that was uploaded to YouTube. During the final episode of Season One, a few seconds of the "pre-show" were shown in the "Year that Was" segment. Since the launch of series 2, the pre-show became a regular feature.

On 30 April 2013 the show was presented from the QTQ-9 studios in Brisbane in front of a live studio audience.

On 21 May 2013 the BBC uploaded a clip from the show on the official Doctor Who YouTube where McKnight interviews himself, reporting from the Doctor Who Pop Up Shop in Newtown.
