= Nine News Melbourne =

Australian news TV program

- Also known as: Television City News (1957–1969); National Nine News (1969–1976, 1980–2008); 9 Eyewitness News (1976–1980)
- Genre: News
- Presented by: News: Alicia Loxley (weeknights); Peter Hitchener (weekends); Sport: Tony Jones (weeknights); Natalie Yoannidis (weekends); Weather: Scherri-Lee Biggs (weeknights); Madeline Spark (weekends)
- Country of origin: Australia
- Original language: English
- No. of seasons: 54

Production
- Production locations: Docklands, Victoria
- Running time: One hour (including commercials)

Original release
- Network: Nine Network
- Release: 20 January 1957 – present

Nine News Melbourne is the weeknight, flagship news bulletin of the Nine Network in Australia, screened in Melbourne, Tasmania, and across Victoria.

Like all Nine News bulletins, the Melbourne bulletin runs for one hour, from 6pm every day. It comprises local, national and international news, as well as sport, weather and finance.

== History ==
The original presenter from inception in 1956 was Sir Eric Pearce and, following Pearce's retirement in 1978 after 22 years at the GTV-9 news desk, Brian Naylor, following his own resignation from the Seven Network Melbourne staton HSV-7, presented GTV-9's news for 20 years to 1998.

Following Naylor's retirement in 1998, he was succeeded by Peter Hitchener as weeknight presenter, while Jo Hall took over from Hitchener as weekend presenter. Hall scaled back her work with Nine to news updates and fill-in duties in November 2011, with Weekend Today newsreader Alicia Loxley taking over as weekend presenter. Rob Gell formerly presented the weather until 2003, when he was replaced by Nixon; Gell subsequently defected to the rival Seven News Melbourne bulletin presenting the weather on weekends.

In March 2011, GTV-9's administration, studios and advertising sales operations were moved from their base of 54 years at Bendigo Street, Richmond, to a new purpose-built building in Bourke Street in Melbourne's Docklands.

In May 2017, GTV-9 launched its first local afternoon news bulletin, Nine Afternoon News Melbourne, putting it head to head with its rival station Seven's local afternoon news. The bulletin is presented by Brett McLeod.

In December 2021, it was announced that Peter Hitchener would scale back to four days a week from January 2022 presenting from Monday to Thursday with Alicia Loxley presenting on Friday.

In November 2023, it was announced that Alicia Loxley and Tom Steinfort would replace Peter Hitchener to present on weeknights and Hitchener will move to weekends from January 2024.

In November 2025, Nixon resigned as weather presenter. Her final bulletin aired on 18 November 2025. She will continue to work with the Nine Network on Getaway and Postcards and remain based at GTV-9. In December 2025, it was announced that Nine News Perth weather presenter Scherri-Lee Biggs will replace Nixon from January 2026.

In September 2026, Tom Steinfort was appointed co‑host of Today, and GTV-9 announced that Alicia Loxley would continue presenting the news solo.

=== Ratings ===
For many decades, Nine News Melbourne was the most dominant local news service, often drawing a peak audience of more than 400,000 viewers. However, in the mid-2000s, the bulletin started to lose ground to the rival Seven News Melbourne, winning only 24 (out of 40) weeks in 2006 and then narrowly losing in 2007 when it won 19 weeks (to Seven's 20 weeks, with the other week tied). Even during the years when Nine News struggled nationally, the Melbourne bulletin remained competitive, being the only metropolitan bulletin to win any weeks against Seven News in 2008 and 2009. By 2012, however, Nine News Melbourne had re-established its ratings dominance, often leading their rivals by an average margin of over 100,000 viewers.

== Current presenters ==
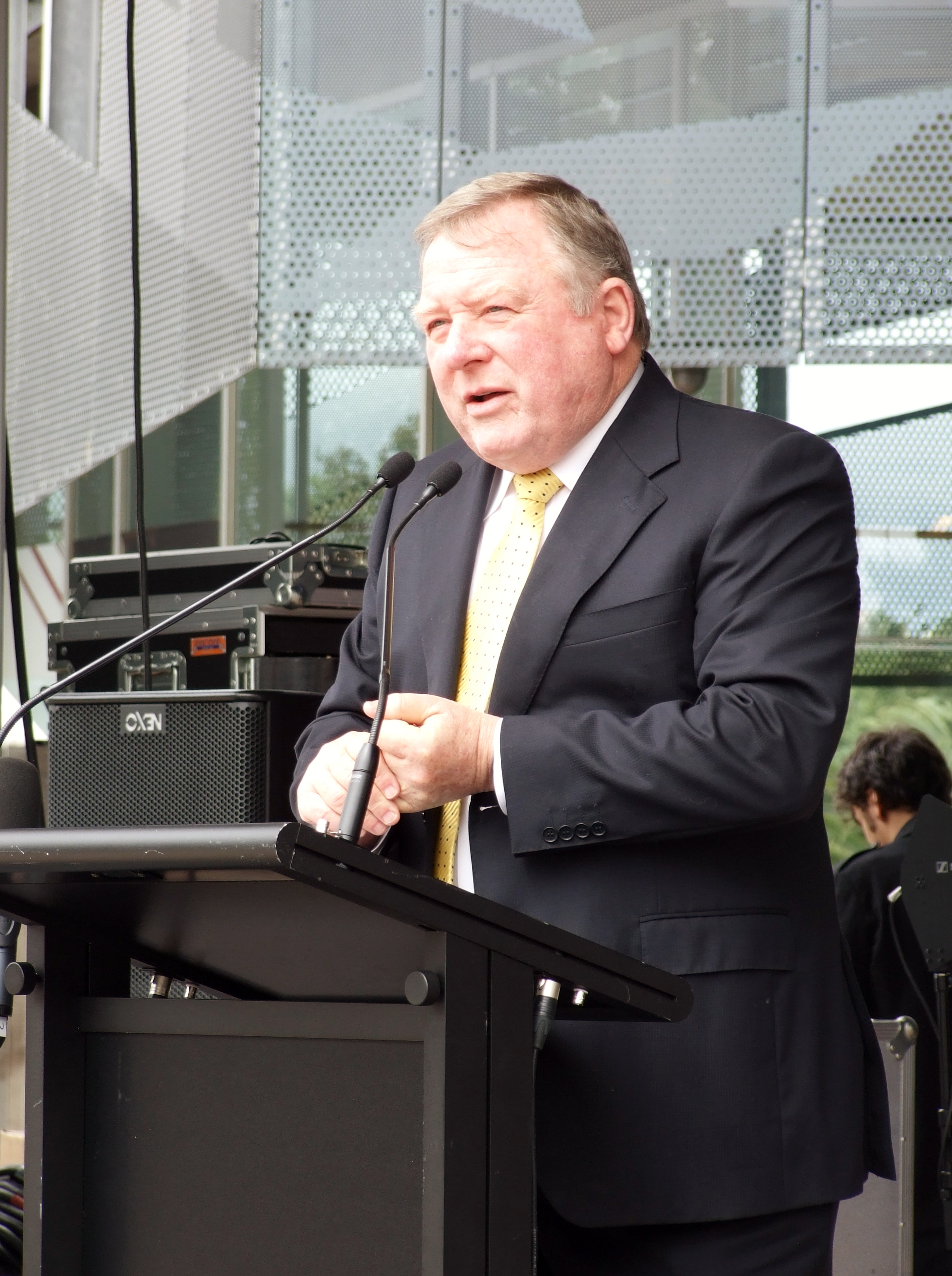
Peter Hitchener, presenter of Nine News Melbourne

Current presenters
Role	Bulletins						
Role	Monday	Tuesday	Wednesday	Thursday	Friday	Saturday	Sunday
News	Alicia Loxley (2024–present)					Peter Hitchener (2023–present)	
Sport	Tony Jones (1990–present)					Natalie Yoannidis (2024–present)	
Weather	Scherri-Lee Biggs (2026–present)					Madeline Spark (2020–present)	

=== Fill-in presenters ===
- Brett McLeod (News)
- Madeline Spark (Weather)
- Stephanie Anderson (News & Weather)
- Natalie Yoannidis (Sport)
- Trent Kniese (Sport)
- Owen Leonard (Sport)
- Isabel Quinlan (Weather)

== Past presenters ==
- Sir Eric Pearce (1956–1978)
- Brian Naylor (1978–1998)
- Tom Steinfort (2024–2026)

== Reporters ==
- Christine Ahern (Today Melbourne reporter)
- Jo Hall
- Alexis Daish (A Current Affair reporter)
- Madeline Spark
- Justine Conway
- Eliza Rugg
- Neary Ty
- Chris Kohler (Finance editor)
- Izabella Staskowski (Today Melbourne reporter)
- Reid Butler (US correspondent)
- Brett McLeod
- Heidi Murphy (State Political reporter)
- Stephanie Anderson
- Lana Murphy
- Penelope Liersch
- Mimi Becker (Europe correspondent)
- Mark Santomartino
- Isabel Quinlan
- Gillian Lantouris
- Amber Johnston
- Ollie Haig
- Edward Godfrey

=== Sport ===
- Natalie Yoannidis
- Trent Kniese
- Owen Leonard
- Joel Kennedy
