= Amelia Adams =

Australian journalist, news presenter, producer and reporter

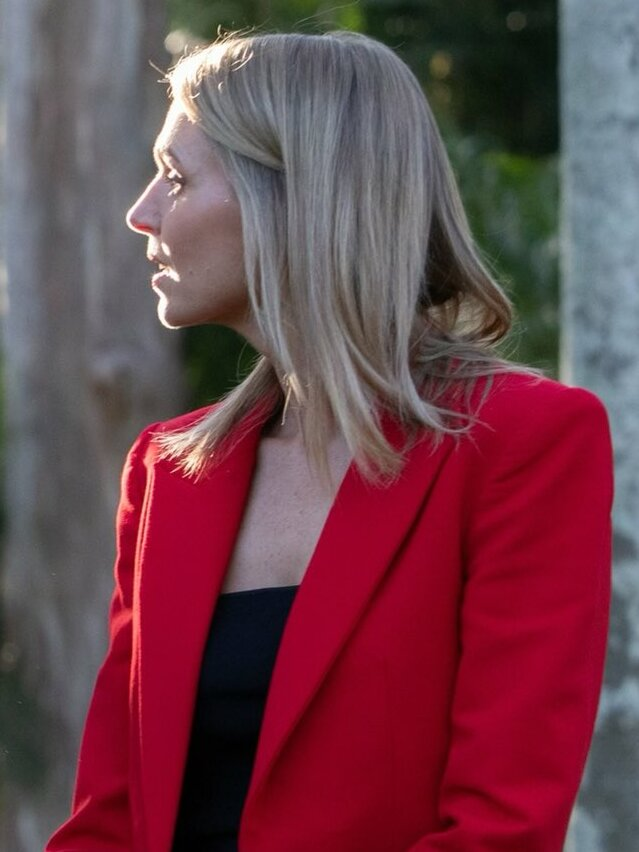
- Adams in 2023
- Born: Amelia Charlton
- Education: Charles Sturt University
- Occupations: Journalist; news presenter; producer; reporter
- Years active: 2003–present
- Employer: Nine Network
- Television: Nine News; 60 Minutes Australia
- Spouse: Luke Adams (m. 2008; sep. 2022)
- Children: 2

Amelia Adams (née Charlton) is an Australian journalist, news presenter, producer and reporter.

== Career ==
In 2003, Adams completed a Bachelor of Communications in Journalism at Charles Sturt University and whilst she was completing her degree, she worked at Sky News Australia. She has also worked as a producer and reporter at the Seven Network on Seven News and Sunrise, and in 2005 moved to Network Ten in Brisbane to be a reporter and presenter on Ten News.

=== Nine Network ===
In May 2008, Adams moved to the Nine Network in Sydney to become a general reporter on Nine News. She has been a regular fill in presenter for a number of Nine News bulletins and a fill-in news presenter on Today and Weekend Today. In 2012, she presented Nine Morning News and Nine Afternoon News whilst regular presenter Wendy Kingston was on maternity leave.

In January 2013, Adams was appointed presenter for both Nine Morning News and Nine Afternoon News with Kingston becoming presenter of Nine News Now. In October 2014, Adams returned from maternity leave to front Nine News Now from Tuesday to Friday with Amber Sherlock hosting on Monday. In May 2016, Adams was appointed presenter of Nine Morning News and Nine Afternoon News while Davina Smith went on maternity leave.

In May 2018, Adams was appointed as Nine News Europe correspondent. She relocated to London with her family in July.

Amelia remained as Europe correspondent until January 2020, she later moved to Los Angeles to become Nine News United States correspondent.

She received the Kennedy Awards for Outstanding TV News Reporting and Outstanding Foreign Correspondent in November 2021.

In August 2022, it was announced that Adams would join 60 Minutes as a reporter, which she did later that year.

== Personal life ==
As the daughter of a pilot, Adams spent time growing up in France where she learnt the language. In October 2008, she married freelance cameraman and photographer Luke Adams in Byron Bay.

In October 2013, Adams announced that she was pregnant with her first child. She gave birth to a son in March 2014. In May 2016, she announced that she was pregnant with her second child, which was born in November 2016. Amelia and Luke separated in 2022.

Preceded by Alison Ariotti	Nine News Now; Presenter; October 2014 – May 2016	Succeeded by Amber Sherlock
Preceded by Wendy Kingston	Nine Morning News; Presenter (Monday to Thursday); May 2016 – July 2018	Succeeded by Sophie Walsh
Preceded by Wendy Kingston	Nine Afternoon News; Presenter (Monday to Thursday); May 2016 – July 2018	Succeeded by Sophie Walsh
