= Vicky Jardim =

Australian television journalist and presenter

- Education: University of Queensland
- Occupation: Journalist
- Years active: 2001 - present
- Employer: Nine Network
- Television: Nine News reporter
- Spouse: Dragi Ristevski

Vicky Jardim is an Australian television journalist and presenter. She is currently a journalist for Nine News Sydney.

== Career ==
Jardim is a reporter and presenter for Nine News Sydney with more than 20 years experience.

After six years in Nine News Melbourne, Jardim relocated home to Sydney in August 2014.

As well as a reporter for the Sydney 6pm News, Jardim is a regular presenter of Nine News Early Edition, Nine News Now, the morning and afternoon bulletins and the late night updates.

Jardim previously worked for the Australian Broadcasting Corporation in Melbourne as a national television and radio reporter, filing stories for Lateline, the 7pm News and 774 radio bulletins.

She also filled-in as a presenter/producer on the ABC's Asia Pacific News. With a keen interest in economics, she worked on the ABC's National Finance Desk.

Jardim has covered a wide range of stories from the Martin Place siege to the Black Saturday bushfires, Office of Police Integrity hearings and underworld murders. Among the highlights of her career were reporting at the 2006 Melbourne Commonwealth Games and hosting a live broadcast at the Dame Elisabeth Murdoch State Memorial Service.

Jardim graduated from the University of Queensland with a Bachelor of Journalism. While studying, she completed a cadetship at Channel 7 in Brisbane and then joined Channel 9, Brisbane as a script assistant.

Her first reporting job as a young journalist was at WIN Television, where after a year she was promoted to reporter/bureau chief.

She is now a reporter and journalist for Nine News Sydney.

== Personal life ==
She is married to Citigroup’s managing director Dragi Ristevski.
