= Brett McLeod =

Australian television news reporter and presenter

- Born: Melbourne, Victoria, Australia
- Occupations: Television reporter; television presenter
- Employer: Nine Network

Brett McLeod is an Australian television news reporter and presenter for Nine News.

== Career ==
=== Television ===
McLeod has had a long association with the Nine Network. He worked as a reporter and relief news presenter for Nine News Melbourne and Nine News, and served as the network’s Europe correspondent from 2002 to 2004, covering major international events including the Boxing Day tsunami in Aceh, conflicts in Iraq, Afghanistan, East Timor, Bangkok and Beirut, and Victoria's Black Saturday fires.

From 2005 to 2021, he was a regular fill‑in presenter for Melbourne’s weekend news, initially stepping in for Jo Hall and later for Alicia Loxley. He frequently covered for Peter Hitchener during summer and also filled in on Today, Nine Morning News and Nine Afternoon News. He additionally presented former programs including Sunday Morning News and Nightline.

In June 2021, McLeod was again appointed Nine News Europe correspondent, commencing the role in September. He remained in the position until August 2024 before returning to Australia as a Nine News Melbourne presenter and reporter.

=== Radio ===
Before joining the Nine Network, McLeod worked at 3AW as a journalist, presenter and news director. He has also been a regular fill‑in host on the station, covering for Tom Elliott and Neil Mitchell.

His radio career began with the comedy program Danger: Low Brow, created at community station 3RRR while he was completing his media degree at RMIT. Known on the show as “Brett Duck,” he later helped take the program to commercial success in both the Breakfast and Drive slots on FOX FM.

McLeod has also filled in as a presenter on ABC Radio Melbourne.
