= Tim Arvier =

Australian journalist

- Years active: 2005–present
- Employers: A Current Affair (2011–16); Nine News Queensland (2017–2019, 2021–25)
- Known for: Journalism
- Website: Nine News profile

Tim Arvier is an Australian journalist.

He was formerly the state political and investigative reporter, and a fill-in presenter, for Nine News Queensland. He was previously North American and European correspondent for Nine News, a reporter on Nine News Darwin and a Queensland reporter for A Current Affair.

== Career ==
Arvier obtained business and journalism degrees from the University of Queensland and early in his career worked casually in the Nine Network Brisbane newsroom before moving to Darwin where he became a reporter and fill-in presenter for Nine News. He then became the Nine Network's Europe correspondent where he covered events ranging from Samantha Stosur's run to the 2010 French Open final to the disappearance of Madeleine McCann. He has also been a reporter on Nine News Perth.

In 2011, Arvier returned to Queensland where he became a reporter on A Current Affair. In March 2014, Arvier was attacked by a Gold Coast pastor while covering a story about the pastor who had admitted to engaging in inappropriate behaviour with women.

In May 2016, Arvier moved to Los Angeles where he became the Nine Network's US correspondent, covering major events such as the death of Muhammad Ali and Donald Trump's victory in the 2016 United States presidential campaign.

In May 2017, Arvier returned to Brisbane where he became a reporter for Nine News Queensland.

In August 2017, while on assignment in Korea covering the standoff between North Korea and the United States over the rogue state's missile testing, Arvier was in the middle of a live cross to Nine's Melbourne afternoon news bulletin when it had to be shut down upon the arrival of a South Korean soldier. Arvier and the camera crew were detained for 20 minutes following the incident, after which they were escorted from the area where the live cross was conducted and released without charge.

In June 2019, Arvier was appointed North American correspondent for Nine News, replacing Robert Penfold who recently retired from the network. In May 2020, he provided on-site eyewitness reports from the unfolding Twin Cities riots arising from the murder of George Floyd in Minneapolis for Today and Nine News, for which he won several awards at the 2020 Queensland Clarion Awards, including the Journalist of the Year. At one point during coverage of the riots, Arvier and television crew were detained by police in the city, but were later released without charge.

In January 2021, Arvier returned to Brisbane and became the state political editor for Nine News Queensland.

In July 2025, Arvier left the Nine Network to begin work for the media department with the Queensland Government.

Media offices
Preceded by Robert Penfold	Nine News; North American correspondent July 2019 – January 2021	Succeeded by Michael Genovese
