= Nine News Now =

2013–2019 Australian news TV program

- Genre: News magazine
- Presented by: Amber Sherlock (Monday – Thursday); Belinda Russell (Friday)
- Country of origin: Australia
- Original language: English

Production
- Production location: Sydney
- Running time: 60 minutes

Original release
- Network: Nine Network
- Release: 7 January 2013 – 29 November 2019

Nine News Now is an Australian afternoon news bulletin that aired on the Nine Network and was presented by Amber Sherlock (Monday – Thursday) and Belinda Russell (Friday).

== History ==
The bulletin was first announced on 20 December 2012. Launched on 7 January 2013, it was originally presented by Wendy Kingston who returned from maternity leave. The bulletin was a direct competitor to The Daily Edition, which launched on 17 June 2013 and that show initially aired from 3 pm to 4:30 pm.

On 17 June 2013, the bulletin received 136,000 viewers across the metro audience, well ahead of the first episode of The Daily Edition, which had 71,000 viewers across the metro audience. The midnight replay of the first episode of The Daily Edition was watched by 80,000 viewers. The next day on 18 June 2013 the bulletin received 107,000 viewers across the metro audience, closing the gap to the second episode of The Daily Edition, which that day increased to 90,000 viewers. A midnight replay of the second episode of The Daily Edition gathered 50,000 viewers. On 16 September 2013, the bulletin's time slot moved from 3 pm until 4 pm to 3 pm until 4:15 pm, the same day that the Seven Network debuted its new game show Million Dollar Minute, with Nine Afternoon News starting at 4:15 pm.

In December 2013, Kingston again went on maternity leave and whilst she was on leave Alison Ariotti and Natalia Cooper along with other presenters filled in for her. Kingston did not return to her original role on Nine News Now, instead becoming the news presenter on Weekend Today. Wendy's last appearance was on 19 December 2013 before she relieved Lisa Wilkinson on Today, who first presented the bulletin on 12 July 2013.

In October 2014, Amelia Adams returned from maternity leave to front the bulletin from Tuesday to Friday with Amber Sherlock hosting on Monday. On 4 May 2015, the bulletin's time slot moved back to 3 pm until 4 pm instead of 3 pm until 4:15 pm, with Nine Afternoon News starting at 4 pm. On 25 February 2016, the bulletin was affected by a blackout at the studios of TCN, on the same day that Peter Costello was announced as the chairman of Nine Entertainment, which resulted in the 4 pm Nine Afternoon News bulletin having to be broadcast from the QTQ studio. In May 2016, Amber Sherlock replaced Amelia Adams presenting the bulletin from Monday to Thursday with Belinda Russell presenting on Friday. In September 2017, Amelia Adams became the Friday presenter with Belinda Russell moving to focus on presenting weather on Thursday and Friday's during Nine Afternoon News.

The bulletin went on hiatus in November 2019, with episodes of the British game show Tipping Point airing in its place during the summer non-ratings period. The bulletin did not return in 2020, with its resourcing used for the return of a late news bulletin.

== Format ==
The bulletin featured the latest news in entertainment along with panel discussions of the day's topics and had limited sports coverage. It was aimed at stay-at-home mothers and women over 55. The Chat Room segment involved panel discussions with Nine News presenters and reporters talking about the hot topics of the day.

On 30 November 2017, a 9Honey segment was added to the bulletin, at 3:10 pm. Fill-in presenters for the bulletin included Sophie Walsh, Vicky Jardim, Sylvia Jeffreys, Amber Sherlock, Deborah Knight and Ross Greenwood.

== Controversy ==
On 12 January 2017, footage was leaked showing Amber Sherlock off-air having an outburst during an advert break on the bulletin because she and fellow journalist reporter Julie Snook were both wearing the same colour white (though Snook argued she was actually wearing a shade of light blue), as well as guest psychologist Sandy Rea. Sherlock stated "we cannot all be in white" for the talk segment and demanded that Snook put on a jacket.

In a statement to 9Honey, Sherlock said that she "probably overreacted" over the situation and that "Live TV can be a pretty stressful beast, at times." Snook told 9Honey that she and Sherlock were still friends and that she does enjoy working with her. The footage was featured on Jimmy Kimmel Live! as part of Jimmy Kimmel's opening for the show. Kimmel said in his opening monologue "I don't know who decided to release this tape but whoever that was I just want to say thank you from the bottom of my heart," It was stated that the staff member at Nine who leaked the video would face disciplinary action, with insiders calling it a "sackable" offence.

== Reception ==
In a 2014 negative review, Craig Mathieson of The Sydney Morning Herald criticised the bulletin for its "vapid and cliched entertainment coverage" and for lacking "a more involved, detailed and perceptive coverage of the day's news". He concluded, "In a sense, Nine News Now is like a rehearsal for what's coming at 4.15pm and then 6pm – it's an outline yet to be completely filled in – that's somehow ended up going to air. If this is what more news coverage means, less might not be such a worrying option."

On 17 January 2020, the Australian Communications and Media Authority released a discussion paper about advertisers on news bulletins including Nine News Now. The discussion paper found out that Nine News Now reported on retail chain Big W's Toy Mania sale featuring products and their prices without disclosures of commercial relationships.
