= Will McDonald (journalist) =

Australian journalist (born 1977)

- Born: 1977 (age 48–49); Adelaide, South Australia
- Occupation: News presenter
- Years active: 2000−present
- Employer: Nine Network
- Television: Nine News

Will McDonald (born 1977) is a South Australian news presenter and journalist, currently presenting the weekend news for Nine News Adelaide at 6pm. He also presents Adelaide's afternoon news from Mondays-Wednesdays.

== Career ==
McDonald's career began in 2000, reporting for local news bulletins in central South Australia. A year later he began presenting local news bulletins in Port Pirie.

In 2004 he joined the Nine Network. Since then, he has covered a wide range of stories across South Australia. He has also filed reports for the Today Show and A Current Affair.

In 2011 when he was announced as the weekend anchor for the bulletin, replacing Georgina McGuinness, who had been in the chair since the 1980s.

In the beginning of 2020, the Nine Network announced that McDonald would also present the afternoon news at 5pm (now 4pm) from Mondays to Wednesdays.

== Personal life ==
McDonald was born at Modbury Hospital (located in the Northern suburbs of Adelaide).

When not in the newsroom, McDonald is found riding his BMW R1150R motorbike.

In 2020, McDonald was diagnosed with Prostate Cancer, at the age of 42.
