= Brian Naylor =

Brian Naylor may refer to:

- Brian Naylor (broadcaster) (1931–2009), Australian broadcaster
- Brian Naylor (racing driver) (1923–1989), British racing driver
