= Let Me Read to You =

- Genre: Reading
- Presented by: Eric Pearce
- Country of origin: Australia
- Original language: English

Production
- Running time: 15 minutes (early episodes); 10 minutes (later episodes)

Original release
- Network: GTV-9
- Release: 30 April – 24 September 1961

Let Me Read to You is an Australian television series which aired on Melbourne station GTV-9 during 1961. Aired in a 15-minute time-slot on Sundays, it consisted of Eric Pearce reading from popular works, accompanied by backdrops. The series ran from 30 April 1961 to 24 September 1961. Later episodes aired in a 10-minute time-slot.

A similar series was Sydney station ATN-7's series Telestory (1961–1962). Somewhat similar series aired on BBC television from 1948 to 1953 called Saturday-Night Story. Of these three series, only Telestory is known to have any surviving episodes, with the BBC series presumed lost, and the archival status of Let Me Read to You being unknown.
