= Davina Smith =

Australian journalist and news presenter (born 1982)

- Born: 1982 (age 43–44); Toowoomba, Queensland, Australia
- Education: University of Southern Queensland
- Occupations: Journalist, news presenter
- Years active: 2002−present
- Employer: Nine Network
- Television: A Current Affair
- Spouse: Mark Cameron (m. 2010)
- Children: 2

Davina Smith (born 1982) is an Australian journalist and news presenter.

Smith is currently a reporter on A Current Affair. She has previously presented Nine Morning News, Nine Afternoon News Sydney and was a news presenter on the Nine Network's Today Extra.

== Career ==
Smith attended St Ursula's College in Toowoomba before studying at the University of Southern Queensland.

In 2002, Smith did work experience in Brisbane's Nine newsroom. That led to a job with Nine's then-regional affiliate WIN News, working as a reporter and presenter in Rockhampton, Toowoomba and the Sunshine Coast.

Smith has also been a relief weather presenter for WIN Television, filling in for Peter Byrne on the various local editions of WIN News in Queensland.

In 2011, Smith moved to the Nine Network in Brisbane, to help fill the void left by the sackings of two journalists and a news producer over the network's "Choppergate" scandal. She primarily presented the weather on weekends, but also filled in as the main presenter whenever required, including when Eva Milic went on maternity leave in 2012.

In February 2014, Smith moved to Sydney and was appointed presenter for both Nine Morning News and Nine Afternoon News while Amelia Adams was on maternity leave. Adams returned from maternity leave in October 2014 becoming presenter of Nine News Now, with Alison Ariotti returning to Queensland to present the news on weekends.

In December 2024, Smith returned to Brisbane to be closer with family and joined A Current Affair as a reporter.

== Personal life ==
Smith grew up on the western outskirts of Toowoomba.

As a Toowoomba local, Smith has said that one of the hardest stories she has covered was the Toowoomba floods. Speaking about the experience, she said: "You write and speak from a different perspective when the story is so personal. I know the experience made me a better journalist".

In 2010, Smith married her partner Mark Cameron in Toowoomba during the city's annual Carnival of Flowers festival.

In May 2016, Smith gave birth to a daughter.
