= Sharlyn Sarac =

Australian journalist

Sharlyn Sarac was born on 21 January 1980 in Perth, Western Australia and entered the media at age 17. Sarac presented the weekend edition of Nine News Perth from 2004 through to 2010.

After working as a surf reporter with Ten News in Perth, she attended the WA Academy of Performing Arts Broadcasting course from 1998 to 2000 and later worked as a reporter at GWN, a Western Australia regional station.

Later moving back to Ten News, she became a general reporter for the 5pm news in Perth.

In 2004, Sarac joined Nine News in Perth where she presents the weekend news and reports on 3 days a week. She has also covered Sonia Vinci's maternity leave. She is also a reporter on Nine's local summer lifestyle program Just Add Water. She has filed numerous stories including interviews with world champion sailors Elise Rechichi and Tessa Parkinson, Olympic rower Ben Curaton as well as taking to the surf herself with H2O Surf Adventures at Scarborough Beach.

In 2010, Sarac resigned from co-presenting weekend news with Matt Tinney.

Media offices
Preceded by Nikki Visar	Nine News Perth; Weekend presenter 2004 – 2010	Succeeded by Matt Tinney (co presented from 2008)
