= Saturday-Night Story =

British television series (1948–1953)

Saturday-Night Story is a British television programme which aired on the BBC from 1948 to 1953. In the series, a person would read a story. These people included Algernon Blackwood and John Slater. During 1948, the series was typically the last programme on the schedule for the day apart from a newsreel. It aired in a 15-minute time-slot. None of the episodes still exists, as the BBC very rarely telerecorded series at the time.

== See also ==
- The Lady from the Sea - Early surviving BBC telerecording
- Telestory - Similar series (1961-1962, Australia)
- Monodrama Theater - Somewhat similar series (1952-1953, United States)
- Saturday Night Theatre - BBC radio drama programme
