= Eric Pearce (broadcaster) =

Australian radio and TV news presenter

Sir Eric Pearce OBE
- A young Pearce
- Born: Eric Herbert Pearce; 5 March 1905; Hampshire, England
- Died: 12 April 1997 (aged 92); Malvern, Victoria, Australia
- Occupations: Radio and television presenter
- Years active: 1933−1978
- Spouses: Ella Mary Pearce (1933–c. 1939) (divorce); Jean Mary Pearce (née Macartney) (1939–1956) (her death); Betty Pearce (fl. 1956–1987) (her death)
- Children: Royston Gyles Pearce (born 1933); Suzanne Constance Pearce (step-daughter, fl. 1956)
- Presenting career
- Show: News
- Station: HSV Channel 7
- Time slot: 6:30 pm
- Show: News
- Station: GTV Channel 9
- Time slot: 6:30 pm

Sir Eric Herbert Pearce (5 March 1905 – 12 April 1997) was an English-born broadcaster and television pioneer in Australia.

Pearce was born in Hampshire, England, and had an early career in radio on the BBC before migrating to Australia where he was a long-term newsreader on Melbourne television stations HSV Channel 7 (1956–65) and GTV Channel 9 (late 1950s–74, 1976–78). Pearce's catchphrase sign-off of his news reports, "God bless you, and you", was for viewers and his third wife.

== Life and career ==
Eric Herbert Pearce was born on 5 March 1905 and grew up in Hampshire, England. He was the elder son of H. C. Pearce of Ryde, Isle of Wight. He completed his studies at London University. Pearce worked for an insurance company and was transferred to Canada. On 11 April 1933 he married Ella Mary, a sales woman, in Winnipeg and the couple had a son, Royston Gyles Pearce, that same year. Pearce returned to England in 1937. He started his radio career and had worked for the BBC – his first time on air had been on a talent quest singing "Little Man, You've Had a Busy Day".

Pearce moved to Australia in 1938. In September 1939 in Sydney, Pearce was engaged to Jean Mary Macartney (1909–1956), and married later that year. By 1942 they were living in Melbourne. During World War 2, on 17 January 1942, Pearce enrolled in the Royal Australian Air Force and was discharged as a flying officer on 29 December that year. In 1956 Jean Mary Pearce died in Sydney aged 47.

In 1962 Pearce compiled a book, Thoughts for Everyday Living: Philosophies and Poetry, for the 75th Year Jubilee Building Appeal of the Queen Victoria Hospital. He had selected various poems, quotations and maxims. By 1963 Pearce had married a third time, to Betty and he had a step-daughter, Suzanne Constance Pearce. His third wife died in 1987.

Pearce died on 12 April 1997, aged 92, at a Malvern nursing home. He had been a devout Anglican, regularly attending St John's in Toorak.

=== Radio career ===
In August 1954, Pearce said that "[Television is] the most potent force for good or evil that's ever been discovered in the communications field of entertainment."

Pearce worked at numerous radio stations in the pre-television era, he had started at 2CH as an announcer upon arriving in Sydney from England. Upon relocating to Melbourne in 1940 he worked at 3XY in radio drama and as a studio manager. In 1942, after his war service, he transferred to 3DB as the chief announcer and feature compere. At 3DB he planned drama and music programmes, Melba (or Life of Melba), Opera for the People and The Amazing Oscar Hammerstein; and the Mobil Quest. He also hosted the annual Radio Hospital Appeal for four years.

From April 1950 he was general manager of 5KA in Adelaide until October 1954 when he returned to Sydney. In August that year Pearce described the new medium of television, "It's the most potent force for good or evil that's ever been discovered in the communications field of entertainment."

When GTV-9 purchased 3AK in April 1962, all GTV-9 personalities were expected to present programs on 3AK. The one-hour program, A Call from Eric, was a request program presented by Pearce from 9.00 am each weekday.

In July 1993, Pearce was interviewed by Denzil Howson on his radio career for Once Upon a Wireless Productions, the recording is preserved by the National Film and Sound Archive.

=== Television career ===
When television came to Australia in 1956, many radio figures sought and achieved employment in the new medium. Pearce was no exception, moving to HSV Channel 7 in Melbourne working as a newsreader and quiz show host. Pearce provided the first TV news report for that channel on 4 November 1956. The Argus' reviewer F. Keith Manzie described Melbourne's first TV broadcast "I liked Eric Pearce as a compere. His easy-mannered, genial personality came right through the viewing screen in the quiz show, I've Got a Secret ... [his] reading of the news was illustrated with appropriate newsreel shots". In 1956 he was also co-host of the series Eric and Mary, and in 1957 he was host of Be My Guest. Pearce resigned from HSV-7 in the late 1950s. He believed that newsreaders required credibility and that doing anything other than news for a job was ill-advised. When GTV Channel 9 offered him employment as chief news reader without him having to do any other shows, he took it. In 1961, he appeared in Let Me Read to You, in which he would read from popular works.

Typically Pearce read the news to Melburnians with his catchphrase sign-off, "God bless you, and you", the second "you" being directed at his wife, Betty. He is best regarded for his coverage of the Moon landing in July 1969. In 1978 Pearce retired and was replaced as GTV Channel 9 newsreader by Brian Naylor. In 1993 he was still working for GTV Channel 9 as a news adviser and head of correspondence, although his official title was Director of Community Affairs. Melissa Agnew describes Pearce in her 2008 book, Here Is the (Australian) News, as one of the "commanding voices ... who, with his golden voice of authority delivered the news on Channel 9". Both Peter Mitchell (Seven News Melbourne) and Peter Hitchener (Nine News Melbourne) acknowledge Pearce as "one of their biggest influences. They both worked under him at Channel 9".

== Private life ==
Pearce was married three times: Ella Mary (fl. 1933); Jean Mary Macartney (1909–1956); and Betty Patterson (née: Ham) (1918–1987). He was a devout Anglican.

== Honours and recognition ==
In March 1965 Pearce received a Logie Award for Outstanding Services to News Reading (Victoria). On 1 January 1970 he was made an Officer of the Order of the British Empire (Civil) with a citation "for services to broadcasting". On 16 June 1979, he was knighted for "services to the community". Pearce was the patron of the Deafblind Association (from 2006 it is known as Able Australia) and was succeeded in 1998 by fellow GTV 9 newsreader, Peter Hitchener. From the 1970s Pearce supported the Richmond Community Health Centre; in 1994 it was re-built as a residential aged care facility and named, Sir Eric Pearce House, in recognition of his support.

On 20 September 1980 Pearce was presented with the Rostrum Award of Merit, for excellence in the art of public speaking over a considerable period and his demonstration of an effective contribution to society through the spoken word.

In 1984 the Camellia reticulata cultivar, "Sir Eric Pearce", was registered by the Australian Camellia Research Society. From January 2009 to November 2011, Roy Slaven (as a member of Roy and HG) read an excerpt from Thoughts for Everyday Living: Philosophies and Poetry, as a tribute to Pearce, at the start of each episode of The Life, a Triple M radio drive-time program.
