= Amber Sherlock =

Australian journalist

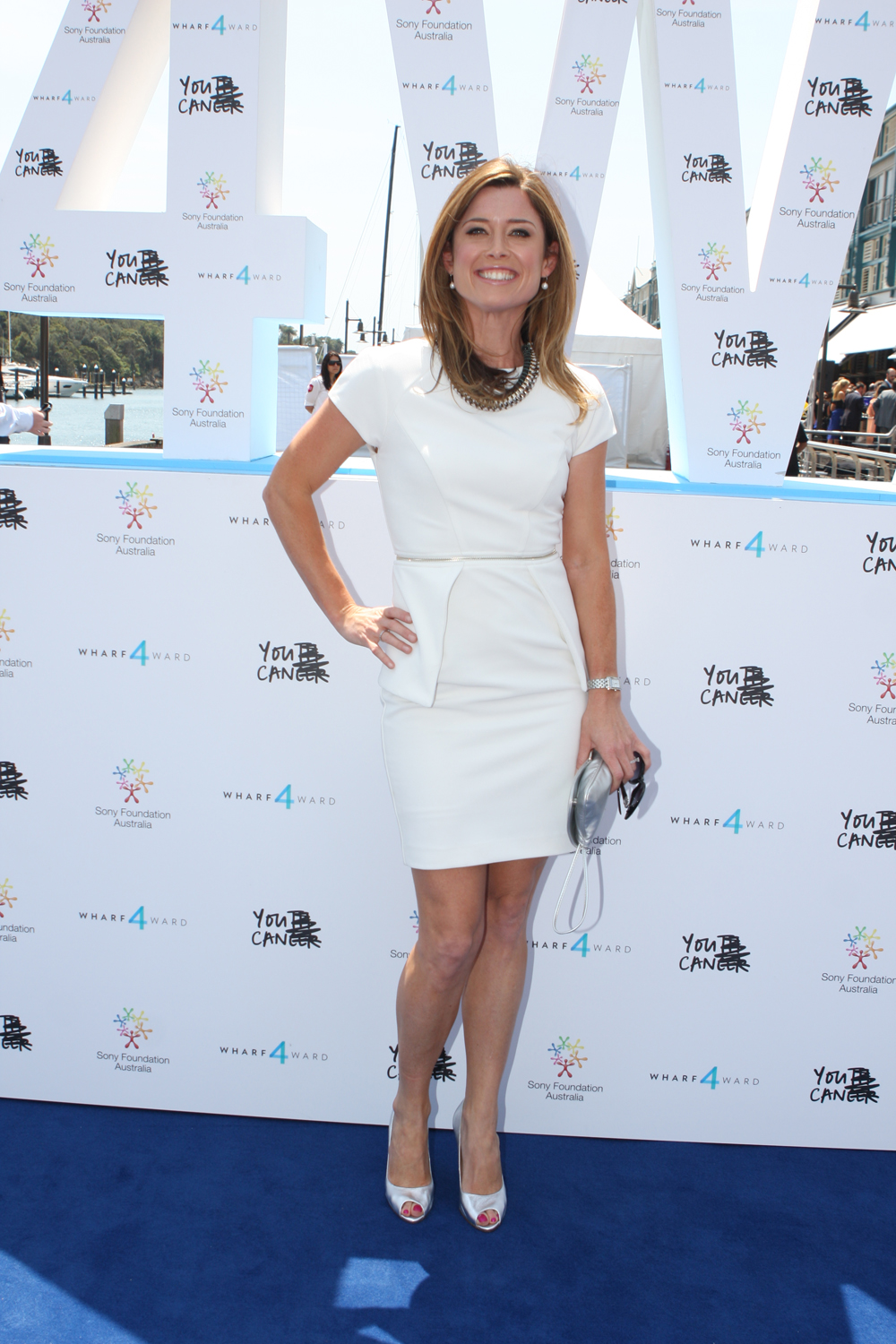
- Amber Sherlock, at the Sony Foundation's Wharf4Ward event in 2012
- Born: Amber Simone Higlett; 1 December 1975 (age 50); Sydney, New South Wales
- Occupations: Journalist; presenter; reporter
- Years active: 1997–present
- Spouse: Chris Sherlock
- Children: 2

Amber Simone Sherlock (née Higlett) is an Australian journalist, television news presenter and reporter. She has previously presented the weather on Nine News Sydney and hosted the daily national one hour news bulletin Nine News Now.

== Career ==
Sherlock began her career at the Seven Network in Sydney and worked for the financial news service at the Commonwealth Bank before joining Network Ten for the Sydney Olympics. She then moved into finance journalism, taking a position in London for several years. She came back to Canberra as a host for a Network Ten current affairs program. Upon her return to Sydney, Sherlock went to work for Commonwealth Securities as a financial journalist, after which she took a position as a news presenter with Sky News Australia.

Sherlock joined the Nine Network in 2007 to present the business segments for Today, the Nine Morning News Hour and Nine Afternoon News. She was the news presenter on Weekend Today and Monday news presenter on Today. Sherlock later presented the morning edition of the Qantas Inflight News. In January 2009, it was announced that Sherlock would be the news presenter for Weekend Today, alongside co-hosts Cameron Williams and Leila McKinnon. In July 2009, Sherlock was appointed Monday news presenter for Today, as Georgie Gardner presents Nine News Sydney on Friday and Saturday.

In April 2011, Sherlock replaced Natalie Gruzlewski as weather presenter on Nine News Sydney.

In November 2025, Sherlock was made redundant from the Nine Network after 18 years with the network.

== Personal life ==
Sherlock is a graduate of the University of Technology, Sydney.

In June 2010, Amber gave birth to a daughter. She went into labour while on air during Weekend Today.

== Controversy ==
On 12 January 2017, footage was leaked showing Sherlock off-air having an outburst during an advert break on Nine News Now because she and fellow journalist reporter Julie Snook were both wearing the same colour white (though Snook argued she was actually wearing a shade of light blue), as well as guest psychologist Sandy Rea. Sherlock stated "we cannot all be in white" for the talk segment and demanded that Snook put on a jacket.

In a statement to 9Honey, Sherlock said that she "probably overreacted" over the situation and that "Live TV can be a pretty stressful beast, at times." Snook told 9Honey that she and Sherlock were still friends and that she does enjoy working with her. The footage was featured on Jimmy Kimmel Live! as part of Jimmy Kimmel's opening for the show. Kimmel said in his opening monologue "I don't know who decided to release this tape but whoever that was I just want to say thank you from the bottom of my heart." It was stated that the staff member at Nine who leaked the video would face disciplinary action, with insiders calling it a "sackable" offence.
