= Tom Steinfort =

Australian television journalist and news presenter

- Born: 1984 (age 41–42); Melbourne, Victoria, Australia
- Occupations: Journalist; TV host; news presenter; podcaster
- Years active: 2007–present
- Employer: Nine Network
- Television: Today

Tom Steinfort (born 1984) is an Australian television journalist, host and news presenter.

Steinfort currently co-hosts the Nine Network's breakfast program Today with Sylvia Jeffreys.

== Career ==
Steinfort began at the Nine Network in 2007 as a general news reporter for National Nine News Melbourne. Later on, he became the network's Europe and US correspondent, as well as a reporter on A Current Affair, a co-host on Weekend Today and news presenter on Today before moving to 60 Minutes in 2020.

In January 2019, Steinfort was appointed news presenter on Today, however he was replaced at the end of the year after the show underwent dismal ratings. He was replaced by Tracy Vo, whose own tenure also did not last long due to the COVID-19 pandemic which forced her to return to Western Australia.

In November 2023, it was announced that Steinfort and Alicia Loxley would replace Peter Hitchener to present Nine News Melbourne on weeknights and Hitchener will move to weekends from January 2024.

In September 2026, Steinfort was appointed co-host of Today alongside Sylvia Jeffreys.

== Personal life ==
Steinfort has two children with wife Claudia Jukic. Frederikke was born around 2022 and Lotte was born in December 2023. The couple announced they are expecting their third child in 2027.

Steinfort is a supporter of the Richmond Football Club in the Australian Football League (AFL) and a supporter of Arsenal F.C. in the English Premier League (EPL).
