= Sophie Walsh =

Australian journalist (born 1985)

- Born: 24 October 1985 (age 41); Sydney, Australia
- Years active: 2009–present
- Employer: Nine Network
- Website: Nine News profile

Sophie Walsh (born 24 October 1985) is an Australian television news presenter journalist.

She is currently a presenter and reporter for Nine News. She has previously been a co-host and news presenter on Weekend Today.

== Career ==
Early in her career Walsh worked as a news reporter and head of newsroom at WIN Television in Bundaberg, where she helped launch a new news bulletin in the Wide Bay area.

In October 2009, she joined the Nine Network in Sydney, where she became a reporter for Nine News, and a fill-in presenter on the network's national bulletins. She also presented newsbursts on Nine's sister channel, 9Go!, in 2010.

In September 2011, she moved to the Brisbane newsroom, which had just been rocked by the sacking of two reporters for their roles in a faked live helicopter cross during a nightly bulletin the previous month. One of the stories she covered was the deportation of four Italian girls from Brisbane to their father's home in Florence, Italy. She also received a Clarion Award nomination for her DMAA investigation into an amphetamine-type chemical used in sports supplements, which resulted in a blanket ban on all products by the Therapeutic Goods Administration on Australian shelves. In addition to her reporting duties, she became the weekend weather presenter in 2014, replacing Davina Smith, and occasionally filled in as weekend news presenter.

In July 2016, after filling in for Alison Ariotti as the weekend co-presenter of Nine News Queensland in the first half of the year whilst she was on maternity leave, Walsh returned to the Sydney newsroom, retaining her roles as a reporter and fill-in weather presenter.

During her time in Sydney, she presented other national bulletins, and has also appeared on the Today and Weekend Today as a reporter and fill-in news presenter. She was also a fill-in presenter on Nine News Sydney. Walsh presented Nine News Sydney on Christmas Day, 2018.

In June 2019, Walsh was appointed European correspondent for Nine News, replacing Michael Best who returned to Australia to become News Director on Nine News Perth. In June 2020, while covering the George Floyd protests in the United Kingdom, Walsh was in the middle of a live cross to Brenton Ragless on Nine's Adelaide evening news bulletin when she was attacked by a bystander on-camera (the attack itself was not seen on air). She was unharmed from the incident.

Walsh returned to Sydney in October 2020, with Carrie-Anne Greenbank replacing her as European correspondent.

In April 2023, Walsh was appointed as news presenter on Weekend Today.

In August 2024, it was announced that Walsh would replace Jayne Azzopardi as co-host of Weekend Today. She remained in the position until December.

== Personal life ==
Walsh is in a relationship with cricketer Moises Henriques. The couple welcomed their daughter in September 2026.
