= Xavier Minniecon =

Australian television weather presenter

Xavier Minniecon (born 4 July 1967) is an Australian former television weather presenter. He was the weekend weather presenter on the Adelaide, South Australia edition of the Nine Network's Nine News from 1997 to 2011.

Minniecon was born in Rockhampton, Queensland on 4 July 1967. He moved to Darwin, Northern Territory in his late teens and attended Darwin High School, where he matriculated. Before working in media, he was employed variously as a computer salesman, assistant gardener, barman, waiter and singing telegram messenger.

Minniecon's media career began in Darwin in 1985 as a police and court radio reporter for the Australian Broadcasting Corporation (ABC), and then later as a television weather presenter for ABC. He joined Channel 9's weekend news team as weatherman in 1997. He is also a popular host for a wide spectrum of organisations and events around the Adelaide area.

Minniecon's recreational interests include cooking, meditation and massage therapy. He also has a long-standing interest in new religion and the supernatural and has published a book of supernatural stories, Shadows—Tales of South Australia's Supernatural.

On 13 January 2011, a spokesperson for Nine Adelaide revealed Minniecon's contract had not been renewed. He now works as a voice artist and professional speaker.

Minniecon is a widower and has three children.
