= Jessica Braithwaite =

Australian television presenter and musician

Jessica Braithwaite is an Australian television presenter and musician born in Mount Gambier, South Australia. She is a Nine News weather, entertainment and chat show presenter and also performs at major music events. Her 2021 single Who You Know hit no. 1 on Australia's AMRAP and Play Mpe radio charts. Her Christmas single 'I Still Get Excited For Christmas' debuted at no. 5 on the iTunes Rock Charts.

In 2020, 2021 and 2023 she hosted the Australian Independent Music Awards with Dylan Lewis.

She has previously presented on Sky News, Ten Eyewitness News, the kids TV show Totally Wild, Studio 10 and Ten Late News.

Braithwaite was a lead singer in the 2013 folk band Gemini Downs gaining Triple J airplay and performing at Australian music festivals including the Big Day Out and Adelaide International Guitar Festival.

Braithwaite is a writer for brands including 9Honey, Tiger Air, Flight Centre and Australian Traveller Magazine. She currently presents for the Nine Network.

She is a Save the Children ambassador.

She is not related to Australian singer Daryl Braithwaite.
