= Matt Tinney =

Australian journalist

Matt Tinney (born 23 May 1984) is an Australian journalist.

He is currently a presenter and reporter at Seven News Perth and Perth correspondent on Sunrise.

== Career ==
Tinney began his reporting career at WIN Television's national headquarters in Wollongong in 2005. He joined WIN News after completing a Bachelor of Arts (Political Science and Italian) at the University of Melbourne, including an internship with the Victorian Parliament.

While studying, Melbourne-born Tinney worked in community television and radio at Channel 31 and SYN FM. For three years, he presented and reported on news, current affairs, and entertainment programs, and received awards for his coverage.

In December 2005, Tinney joined WIN Television in Wollongong as a political reporter. He also presented news updates and bulletins for WIN News WA, Riverina/MIA (NSW), Central West (NSW) and Illawarra (NSW).

In February 2008, Tinney moved to Western Australia to Perth and joined the Nine News team as a reporter and co-anchor of the weekend news with Sharlyn Sarac.

In 2009, he was awarded the Tourism Award at the Western Australian Journalists Association Awards.

In April 2011, Tinney was appointed WIN News Western Australia weeknight presenter replacing Deborah Kennedy. He left this role during 2012 to present Nine's Afternoon News in Perth. From November 2012 to January 2013 he was the interim presenter of Nine News Perth on weeknights, following Greg Pearce's resignation. After Tim McMillan's appointment, he resumed the Nine Afternoon News, replacing Lee Steele.

In December 2014, Tinney resigned from the Nine Network and later announced that in January 2015 he would join the Seven Network as a Perth correspondent on Sunrise. In May 2015, Sunrise introduced a Perth bulletin, anchored by Tinney, into its program, which airs at 7:00 am in place of one of the national news updates.

Media offices
Preceded by Deborah Kennedy	WIN News Western Australia; Weeknight presenter April 2011 – March 2012	Succeeded by Axed
Preceded by Sharlyn Sarac (co-presenter 2008-2010)	Nine News Perth; Weekend presenter February 2008 – April 2011	Succeeded by Louise Momber & Ebbeny Faranda
Preceded by New position	Sunrise; Perth correspondent January 2015 – present	Succeeded by Incumbent
Preceded by New position	Sunrise; Perth newsreader May 2015 – present	Succeeded by Incumbent
