= Peter Overton =

Australian television presenter and journalist (born 1966)

Peter Overton AM
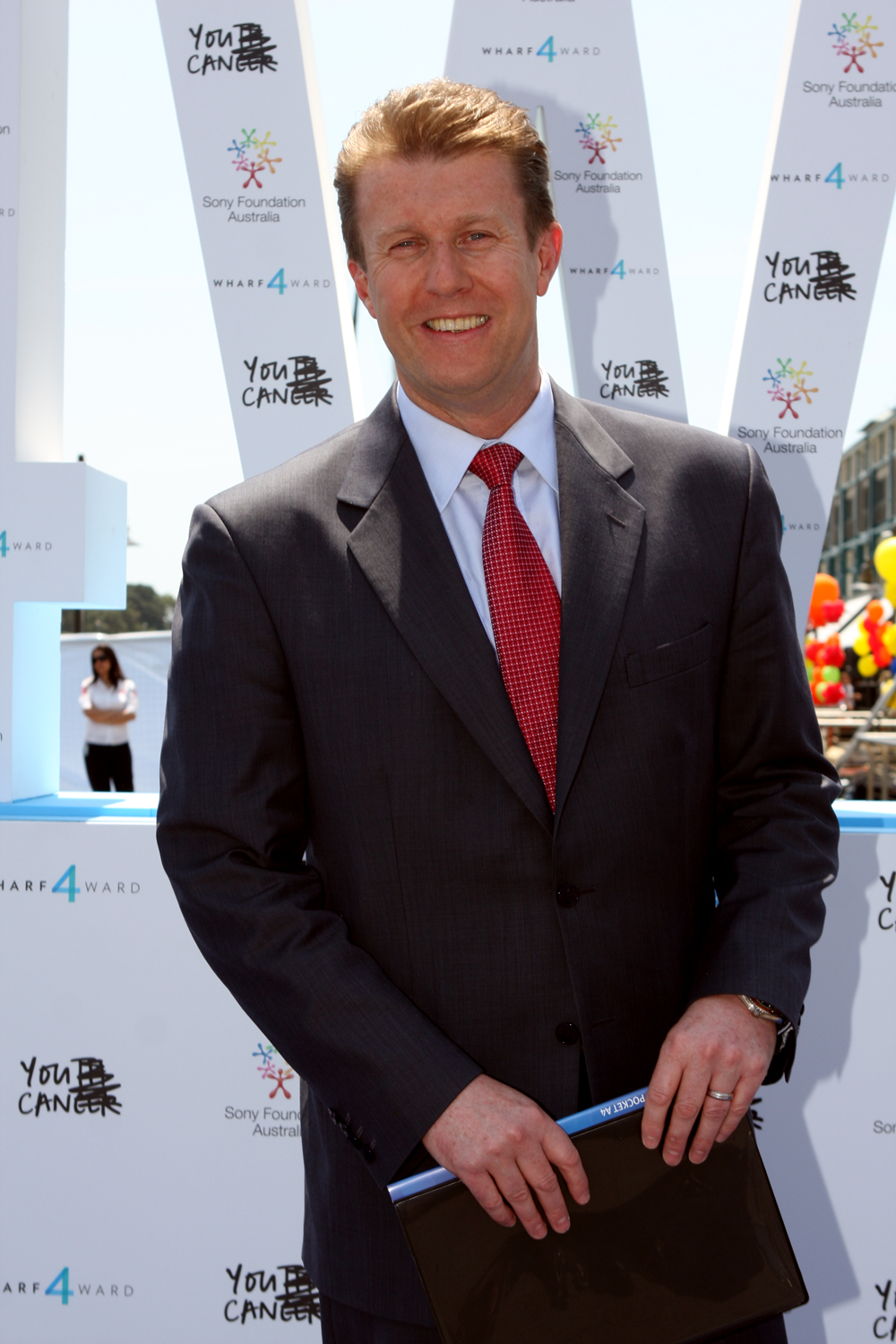
- Overton in 2012
- Born: 5 April 1966 (age 60); London, England, UK
- Education: North Sydney Boys High School; Macquarie University
- Occupations: Journalist, television news presenter
- Years active: 1991–present
- Employer: Nine Network
- Television: Nine News
- Spouse: Jessica Rowe (m. 2004)
- Children: 2

Peter John Overton, AM (born 5 April 1966) is an Australian television journalist and news presenter.

He is currently presenter on Nine News Sydney. Overton also presently serves as a specialist reserve public affairs officer in the Royal Australian Air Force, holding the rank of Wing commander.

== Early life and family ==
Born in London, England, Overton moved to Australia at age two after his parents returned home to the country. He grew up in Longueville, a suburb on the Lower North Shore of Sydney. He went to Lane Cove Public School and North Sydney Boys High School. He graduated with a Bachelor of Economics from Macquarie University. He also played the tuba whilst at Lane Cove Public School.

His father, Dr. John Overton, was an associate professor of anaesthesia at the University of Sydney and worked at The Children's Hospital at Westmead.

In the mid-1990s, Overton married his childhood sweetheart, but their marriage ended in divorce in 2000.

In mid 2001, Overton began dating then Ten News at Five presenter Jessica Rowe. Overton and Rowe married in 2004 and have two daughters.

== Career ==
Overton joined the Seven Network in Adelaide during the 1980s and 1990s as a sport reporter.

Overton joined the Nine Network soon after as a reporter for Nine News and later was appointed weekend sports presenter on Nine News in Sydney and fill-in presenter for Ken Sutcliffe. He also filed weekday news updates from the newsroom during Brian Henderson's tenure as presenter of Nine News in Sydney.

Overton occasionally presented weekend news bulletins, and substituted on National Nine Early News and Today news for Sharyn Ghidella and on Nightline for Jim Waley. He also co-hosted Nine's coverage of the Thredbo disaster with Tracy Grimshaw.

He was a reporter for the current affairs program 60 Minutes for eight years and also held positions at 2UE, Sky News Australia and the Seven Network in Adelaide. In Overton's 60 Minutes interview with Tom Cruise in 2005, Overton asked Cruise about his split from Nicole Kidman and how the two will continue to interact and care for their children, Cruise told Overton he was "stepping over the line" and that he should "take responsibility" for his form of questioning, before telling Overton to "put your manners back in", although Overton apologized and Cruise became cordial with him by the end of the interview.

In January 2009, Overton was appointed presenter of Nine News Sydney replacing Mark Ferguson following poor ratings. Ratings remained constant in his first week, with Nine dropping to fourth behind then-leader Seven, the ABC and Ten. However, after years of steady progress, Nine would later regain the ratings lead in the Sydney market. He also presents the Sunday edition of Nine's Late News; the weeknight edition is presented from Perth by Michael Thomson.

Overton had a cameo role as himself in the 2011 Australian horror film The Tunnel, in the sci-fi film Pacific Rim Uprising as well as himself in Fast X.

Overton was appointed a Member of the Order of Australia in the 2020 Australia Day Honours.

== Community roles ==
Overton is a patron of the MonSTaR Foundation, a charity raising money and awareness of motor neurone disease. He is an ambassador for Special Olympics Australia, a not-for-profit organisation that supports children and adults with an intellectual disability.

Overton is also a Wing Commander in the Royal Australian Air Force as a specialist reserve public affairs officer.

Media offices
| Preceded by Mark Ferguson | Nine News Sydney; Weeknight presenter 12 January 2009 – present | Succeeded by Incumbent |
| Preceded by Originator | Nine News: First at Five; Presenter (Sun); February 2011 – January 2015 | Succeeded by Alicia Loxley |
| Preceded by Originator | Nine News Late; Presenter; March 2020 – present | Succeeded by Incumbent (Sundays); Michael Thomson (Mondays to Thursdays) from 25 May 2020 |
