= Leila McKinnon =

Australian journalist

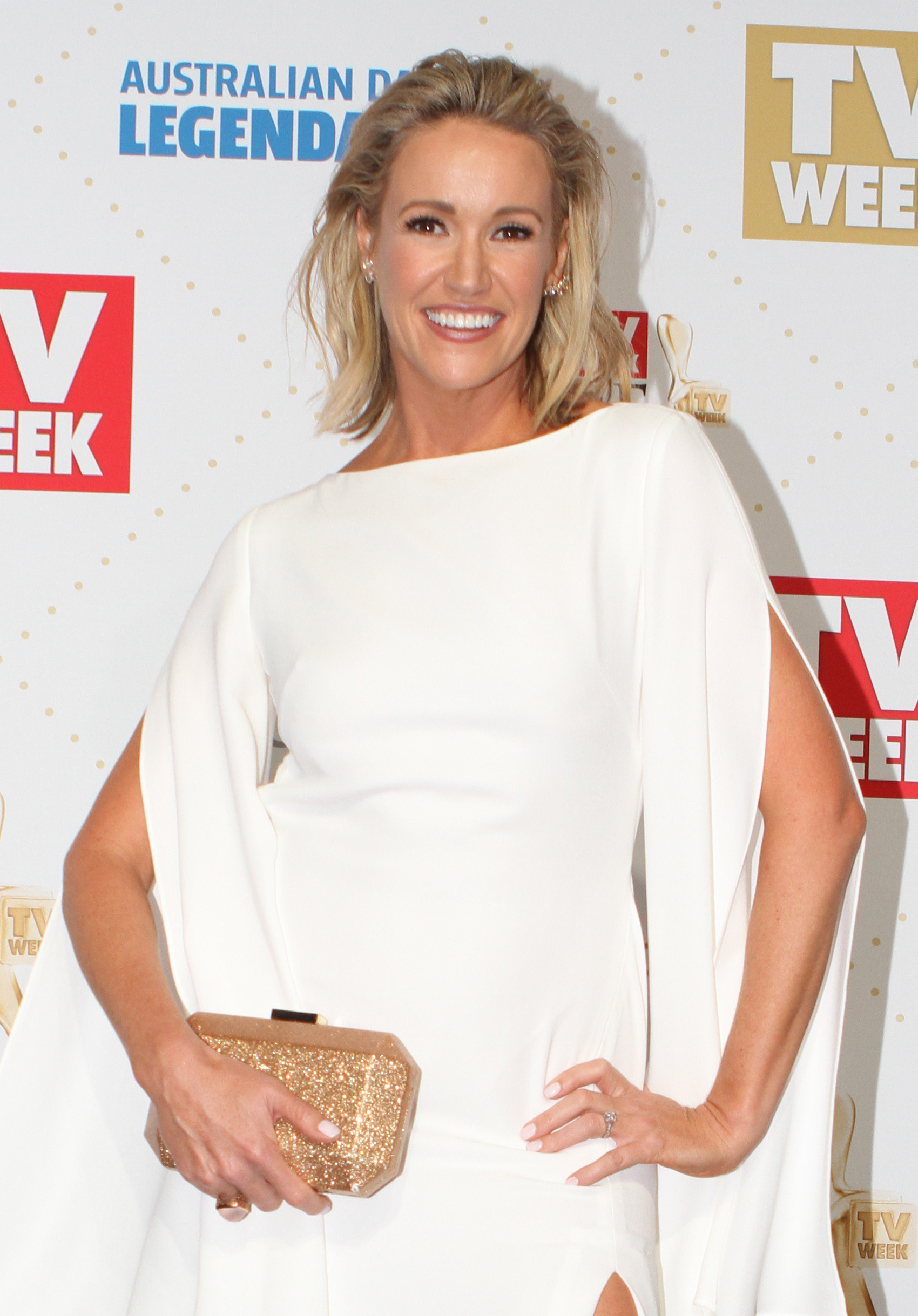
- McKinnon at the 2016 TV Week Logie Awards
- Born: 28 September 1972 (age 54); Tehran, Iran
- Occupations: Journalist; television presenter; reporter
- Years active: 1993–present
- Employer: Nine Network
- Spouse: David Gyngell (m. 2004)
- Children: 2

Leila McKinnon (born 28 September 1972) is an Australian journalist and television presenter.

She is currently a reporter and fill-in presenter for Nine News and A Current Affair. McKinnon has previously been co-host of Weekend Today.

== Personal life ==
McKinnon was born in Iran to an English mother and a New Zealand father. She grew up in Auckland and moved to Brisbane when she was 15.

In 2012, McKinnon gave birth to her first child. McKinnon's second child was born in 2014.

== Career ==
McKinnon completed a journalism degree at the Queensland University of Technology, reporting part-time for The Sunday Telegraph in Brisbane while she studied. She began her television career in 1993 with a cadetship at WIN Television in Rockhampton, Queensland, later moving to WIN Television Cairns bureau. In 1995 she joined the Nine Network, reporting and presenting for Nine Gold Coast News., and within three years became a reporter for A Current Affair in Brisbane.

As a foreign correspondent for the Nine News based in Los Angeles, McKinnon reported across the United States and was the first journalist to locate and confront the doctor Jayant Patel, who was subsequently extradited to Australia to face charges relating to patient deaths at a Mackay hospital. She also reported from Guantanamo Bay. She has reported on major national and international events and interviewed figures including former Prime Minister Julia Gillard, Tom Hanks, Pierce Brosnan and Beyoncé

McKinnon was appointed news presenter for Today in 2005 and later presented the National Nine Morning News bulletin. From 2009 she co-hosted Weekend Today alongside Cameron Williams, hosting the program until 2014.

In 2012 she co-hosted Nine's coverage of the London Olympic Games, during which she conducted the first live interview with Princes William and Harry.

Her 2008 A Current Affair interview with Corey Worthington, following a widely publicised house party, attracted significant public attention online. It's been widely speculated to have inspired the 2012 movie Project X, although this was never confirmed or denied by any of the writers or producers.

In 2011 and 2012, she wrote a weekly rugby league column for NRL.com. McKinnon is the editor of Australia's Favorite Recipes (2012), a cookbook which raises money for the charity Legacy and features the family recipes of ordinary Australians.

In May 2017, McKinnon and Nine News journalist Neil Breen teamed up to host The Way It Was, a podcast which dissected the weekly news cycle.

In 2022, McKinnon was announced as one of the new hosts for the sixth season of Australian Ninja Warrior alongside Jim Courier and sideline presenters Will & Woody.

McKinnon hosted Nine's coverage of the 2024 Paris Olympics and went on to host the network's Milano Cortina Winter Olympics coverage the following year.

In 2026, McKinnon launched History's Fly on the Wall, an online history publication examining historical events through the perspectives of peripheral witnesses.
