= Nick McCallum =

Australian journalist

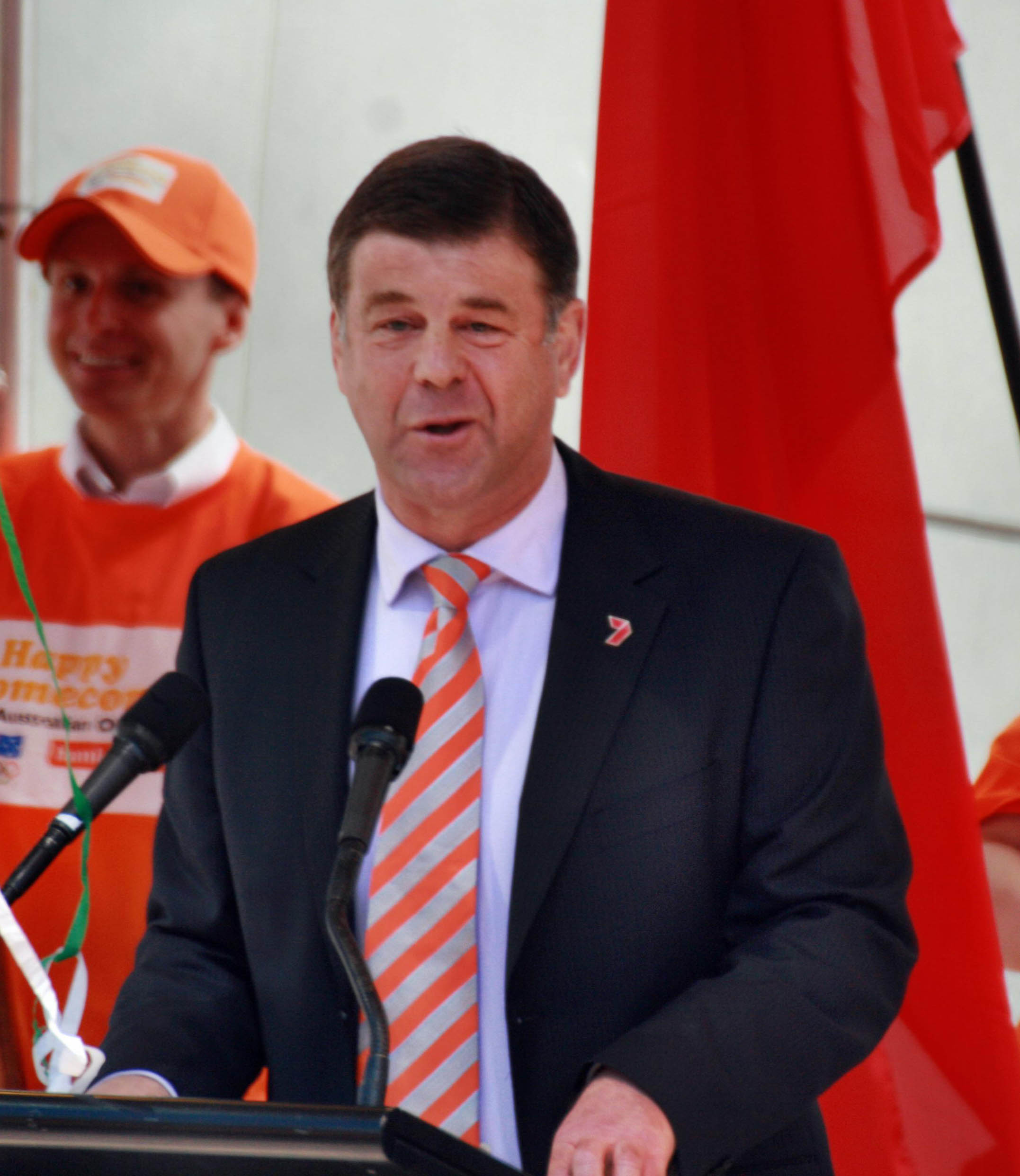
Nick McCallum

Nick McCallum is an Australian television and radio journalist.

As a broadcast journalist, McCallum works as a senior reporter on Seven News and as a part-time presenter for Melbourne radio station 3AW. He has also produced documentaries for Fox Footy.

== Early days ==
McCallum was educated at Scotch College, Melbourne, and from an early age wanted to become a journalist. He is quoted as saying "News was so much more interesting than maths". During his time at Scotch he was involved in the schools sporting program and edited the school newspaper.

== Career ==
McCallum spent part of his early career at Network Ten, reporting as part of their news bulletin.

=== Nine Network ===
At the Nine Network, McCallum was a senior presenter for National Nine News and Melbourne reporter for Today. He spent seven years as the United States Correspondent for National Nine News, covering five Academy Awards, the impeachment of President Bill Clinton, Pat Rafter's two US Open victories and the election of George W Bush.

On his return to Australia he worked for Today, covering the Iraq war from the US Central Command in Qatar, the two Bali bombings and the London underground bombings.

=== Seven Network ===
In 2007, McCallum moved from the Nine Network to join the Seven News team as a reporter.

He also presents in-depth reports on the Seven Network's breakfast television program, Sunrise and opinion pieces on the Seven News website.

McCallum has also been a fill-in presenter on Seven News Melbourne.

=== 3AW ===
McCallum is a contributor to 3AW's Sunday Morning presenting alongside Heidi Murphy and Darren James. He had been a fill-in presenter for 3AW morning host Neil Mitchell when he was absent. and now is a fill-in presenter on the Drive program.

He began contributing to 3AW's Afternoon program from Los Angeles in 1994.

==== Controversy ====
In December 2007, McCallum apologised to 3AW listeners, admitting that he had been hoaxed in an interview with a man who claimed to be Peter John Walker, who, in 1965, escaped from Pentridge Prison with Ronald Ryan. Ryan was the last man executed in Australia when he was hanged in 1967 for the murder of prison guard George Hodson. In the interview the man denied he or Ryan killed Hodson. The real Peter John Walker, who was released from jail in 1983, came forward after hearing the interview. McCallum, who was standing in for regular morning show presenter Neil Mitchell, apologised to listeners. The revelation brought about a torrent of talkback callers, some saying McCallum was naive and others saying he had courage to publicly admit he had made a mistake.

== Personal life ==
McCallum is married to wife Elissa and they have two adult sons. He lives in the eastern suburbs of Melbourne, and is a keen supporter of the Melbourne Football Club. His wife is of Greek heritage.
