= Nine News =

Television news service in Australia

9News
- Division of: Nine Network
- Opening Theme: "Tar Sequence" (Early 1980s–present)
- Founded: 1956; 70 years ago
- Headquarters: 1 Denison Street, North Sydney
- Area served: Australia
- Formerly known as: National Nine News (1969–2008)
- Broadcast programs: Today; Weekend Today; Today Early News; 9News Morning; 9News Afternoon; 9News First at Five; 9News; A Current Affair; 60 Minutes; 9News Late
- Parent: Nine Entertainment

Nine News (stylised as 9News) is a national news service on the Nine Network in Australia. Its flagship program is an hour-long bulletin at 6:00 pm, with editions produced by Nine's owned-and-operated stations in Sydney, Melbourne, Brisbane, Adelaide, and Perth. A half-hour news program for the Gold Coast also airs every weeknight at 5:30pm before the 6:00pm news. National bulletins air throughout the day and evening, broadcast from Nine's headquarters in Sydney.

Until the mid-2000s, Nine News was positioned as the highest-rated news service in Australia, but it was overtaken by rival news service Seven News in 2005 before regaining the top position in 2013.

== History ==
9News, previously known as Channel 9 News (1956–1969) in Sydney and Brisbane, Television City News (1957–1969) in Melbourne, National Nine News (1969–1976, 1980–2008), 9 Eyewitness News (1976–1980) — is one of Australia's longest-running television news services, founded in 1958, along with Seven News on the rival Seven Network.

On 20 October 2008, National Nine News was renamed to Nine News.

At Nine's 2023 upfront presentation, Nine announced the upcoming launch of Nine News Tasmania, a new bulletin to air from 6:00 pm to 7:00 pm seven nights a week on TVT Tasmania, on-par with Nine's other flagship bulletins. The bulletin, featuring local, national and international news was to be presented from a new studio in Hobart with local bureaus located in Launceston and the Northwest Coast. Intended to launch in early 2023, the bulletin was abandoned and featured no mention at the following years' upfront presentation. WIN News Tasmania continues to air local news at 5:30 pm weeknights followed by Nine News Melbourne at 6:00 pm nightly.

On 1 January 2024, Nine News updated the new on-air presentation graphic and brand as 9News.

On 8 June 2025, Nine News received international attention when its American correspondent Lauren Tomasi was shot with a rubber bullet by a police officer while covering the June 2025 Los Angeles protests.

== National bulletins ==
=== Today Early News ===
Today Early News is a half-hour bulletin airing at 5:00 am on weekdays, presented from TCN studios in North Sydney by Jayne Azzopardi.

Originally pre-recorded, the bulletin began as the "AM Edition" of Qantas Inflight News, a daily update for passengers. Early morning bulletins were introduced in the early 1990s under the titles Daybreak and later National Nine Early News. In 2003, the early morning bulletins were discontinued when Today was extended to begin at 6:00 am. The bulletin, which was presented by Sharyn Ghidella and Chris Smith, briefly resumed at 6:00 am in February 2005 before being cancelled again in July 2005. Presenters, including Amber Sherlock, Alicia Loxley, Belinda Russell, Julie Snook, Lara Vella and Alex Cullen anchored the bulletin at various times. In mid-2014, Snook replaced Russell but was promoted to the sports department two years later, with Vella assuming the role.

In October 2014, the bulletin underwent changes after its contract with Qantas ended. It rebranded as Nine News: Early Edition, featuring a Nine News feed and finance/weather tickers. The segment included a review of newspaper front pages (e.g., The Australian, The Courier-Mail, and The Advertiser) and transitioned from pre-recorded to live crosses.

In April 2024, the bulletin was renamed Today Early News to align with the Today brand, mirroring a similar rebrand by Seven News.

=== 9News Morning ===
9News Morning airs at 11:30 am on weekdays, presented from TCN studios in North Sydney by Deborah Knight (Monday–Thursday) and Kate Creedon (Friday). Fill-in presenters include Kate Creedon, Alison Piotrowski and Mark Burrows.

Originally titled National Nine Morning News, the bulletin has aired since 1981, first hosted by Eric Walters. It expanded to one hour on 4 May 2009. From 2004 to 2008, it was branded Morning Edition and later AM Edition until May 2009.

Local editions previously aired in Perth (March–December 2014) and Queensland (2014–2017). The Queensland edition provided updates during daylight saving on the southeast coast but was axed in October 2017.

=== 9News: First at Five ===
9News: First at Five airs at 5:00 pm on weekends, presented from GTV studios in Docklands by Ollie Haig.

Launched in January 2011 to counter Network Ten's schedule shift, the bulletin does not air in Sydney and Brisbane on Sundays during the NRL season or live sports broadcasts. Originally hosted from Sydney by Georgie Gardner and Peter Overton, the production moved to Melbourne in 2015.

=== 9News Late ===
9News Late airs Sundays at ~9:45 pm (post-60 Minutes) and weeknights at ~10:00 pm, hosted by Jane Goldsmith (Sunday), Tracy Vo (Monday–Tuesday), and Natalia Cooper (Wednesday–Thursday) from STW studios in Perth. Launched in 2020 during the COVID-19 pandemic, 9News Late initially broadcast from Willoughby before relocating weeknight production to Perth in May 2020.

Fill-in presenters include Michael Genovese and Melissa Downes. The bulletin succeeded Nightline (1992–2008; 2009–2010), which was cancelled due to budget cuts and later declining ratings.

=== 9News Updates ===
Short, localised updates air weekday afternoons, presented by state-based reporters. National evening updates originate from Sydney, while weekend late updates are broadcast from Perth (previously Melbourne).

== Online presence ==
9News.com.au is the Nine Network's web news portal. According to third-party web analytics provider Similar Web, it is the 57th most visited website in Australia, as of June 2025. Similar websites rate the portal as the 5th most visited news website in Australia, as of April 2023.

=== YouTube ===
9News Australia has a YouTube channel that shares clips from 9News programs. The channel has approximately 1.63 million subscribers as of May 2025.

=== 9News Podcast ===
9News Podcast was a podcast that provided listeners with the latest developments in local, national, and international news. The 10-minute national news bulletin was presented by Nine Radio journalists – working with the newsrooms of 2GB, 3AW, 4BC and 6PR – and utilises the resources of 9News’ team of journalists.

=== Live streaming ===
In June 2008, live streaming of the 6:00 pm bulletins from Sydney, Melbourne, and Brisbane were introduced on the Nine News website. These bulletins are accessible nationwide. Nine Morning News, Nine Afternoon News, and later Nine News Now were also made available for live streaming online.

By 2014, the 6:00 pm bulletins from Adelaide and Perth were added to the platform. Additionally, the Nine News website introduced the capability to stream live press conferences and live feeds from various Nine News helicopters across the country during breaking or developing stories.

== Capital-based bulletins ==
=== Afternoon news ===
==== National bulletin ====
Nine News' national afternoon news bulletin was launched in 2004 as Afternoon Edition in response to the launch of a 4:30 pm bulletin on Seven the year before which was brought about by an extended coverage of the invasion of Iraq. On 29 June 2009, the bulletin was replaced by an hour-long news magazine program, This Afternoon, which was axed after 12 programs due to poor ratings. The half-hour bulletin returned on 15 July 2009, and was extended to 60 minutes in November 2010 as Nine Afternoon News.

Past presenters of the national bulletin include Georgie Gardner (2004), Mike Munro (2005–2006), Kellie Sloane (2006–2008), Leila McKinnon (2008), Wendy Kingston (2008–2009), Alicia Loxley (2011), Mark Ferguson (2009), Wendy Kingston (2009–2012), Amelia Adams (2012–2014), and Davina Smith (2014–2016).

A separate edition for Western Australia was introduced on 14 March 2012 and is simulcast on WIN Television in regional WA. Regional news coverage is incorporated into the bulletin following WIN's decision to end separate WIN News bulletins for regional Western Australia. The local bulletin was axed in July 2013 but later reintroduced as a thirty-minute addition to the national bulletin on 7 October 2013.

Thirty-minute additions to the national bulletin were introduced in both Queensland and Adelaide in 2014.

==== Local bulletins ====
In 2017, following the extension of Millionaire Hot Seat to 60 minutes, the Western Australian, South Australian, and Queensland bulletins were reformatted to statewide, hour-long 4:00 pm bulletins under the brand Nine Live to replace the national bulletin in full. On 1 May 2017, Victoria received its own local hour-long bulletin while the former national bulletin was reformatted to serve New South Wales. Both Victoria and New South Wales retained the Nine Afternoon News brand.

9News Afternoon currently air at 4:00 pm on weekdays in five separate editions:

- The Sydney edition is presented from TCN studios in North Sydney by Deborah Knight (Monday–Thursday) and Kate Creedon (Friday) and weather presenters Sophie Walsh (Monday–Thursday) and Belinda Russell (Friday). The bulletin is simulcast across New South Wales and the ACT through NBN in Northern NSW and Nine affiliate WIN Television in Southern New South Wales, the ACT, and Griffith. Fill-in presenters include Mark Burrows and Lizzie Pearl.
- The Melbourne edition is presented from GTV studios in Docklands by Brett McLeod or rotating presenters, sport presenter Natalie Yoannidis and weather presenter Scherri-Lee Biggs. The bulletin is simulcast across regional Victoria, Tasmania, and Mildura through Nine affiliate WIN Television. When Brett is not presenting, rotating presenters may include Stephanie Anderson, Eliza Rugg, and Chris Kohler.
- The Queensland edition is presented from QTQ studios in Mount Coot-tha by Aislin Kriukelis (Monday–Tuesday) and Alison Ariotti (Wednesday–Friday) with sport presenter Jonathan Uptin and weather presenters Garry Youngberry (Monday–Thursday) and Luke Bradnam (Friday). The bulletin is simulcast across regional Queensland and the Gold Coast through NBN, NTD in Darwin and Nine affiliates WIN Television and remote eastern and central Australia on Imparja Television. Fill-in presenters include Alison Ariotti, Aislin Kriukelis, and Dominique London.
- The Adelaide edition is presented from NWS studios in Adelaide by Will McDonald (Monday–Wednesday) and Alice Monfries (Thursday–Friday), sport presenter Tom Rehn, and weather presenter Jessica Braithwaite. The bulletin is simulcast across South Australia through affiliates WIN SA and Nine GDS/BDN. The afternoon bulletin moved from 4:00 pm to 5:00 pm in early 2020, airing immediately before the 6:00 pm bulletin and swapping positions in the schedule with Millionaire Hot Seat. The afternoon bulletin returned to 4:00 pm in January 2024.
- The Perth edition is presented from STW studios in Perth by Monika Kos with sport presenter Paddy Sweeney and weather presenter Natalia Cooper. The bulletin is simulcast across Western Australia through affiliate WIN Television. The Pulse is a daily segment that presents news stories from the perspectives of local personalities, offering alternative viewpoints on current events. The bulletin moved time slots from 5:00 pm back to 4:00 pm on 18 March 2024, following Nine Adelaide's decision to do the same to their afternoon news bulletin in December 2023.

=== Nightly news ===
==== Sydney ====
9News Sydney reporter Laura Tunstall interviewing a rail officer at Sydney Olympic Park.

9News Sydney is presented from the TCN studios in North Sydney by Peter Overton (Sunday–Thursday) and Mark Burrows (Friday and Saturday) with sport presented by James Bracey (Sunday–Thursday) and Zac Bailey (Friday and Saturday) and weather presented by Sophie Walsh (Sunday–Thursday).

Between 2008 and 2020, the evening bulletin was simulcast on local radio station Hope 103.2, until Hope Media launched their news service.

Henderson retired in November 2002, with then Sunday and weekend presenter Jim Waley taking over as weeknight anchor. Despite winning the 2003 and 2004 ratings seasons (the former by a margin of over 100,000 viewers), Waley was replaced three years later by weekend presenter Mark Ferguson, after which National Nine News started to lose its long-time ratings lead in Sydney to the rival Seven News, winning just one (out of 40) ratings week in 2005 (a huge, negative turnaround from winning all 40 ratings weeks in 2003).

In January 2009, Peter Overton became Nine's Sydney anchor, with Ferguson returning to his former weekend role (replacing Michael Usher and his predecessor Mike Munro).

In 2011, Nine News overtook Seven News in Sydney in the ratings for the first time in seven years, winning 26 weeks to Seven's 14 weeks.

In December 2016, long-time sports presenter Ken Sutcliffe retired after 34 years of presenting the sport; he was replaced by Cameron Williams.

In December 2017, Deborah Knight was appointed as presenter of Nine News Sydney on Friday and Saturday nights, replacing Georgie Gardner, who replaced Lisa Wilkinson on Today.

In January 2019, Knight was appointed co-host of Today and continued to present Nine News Sydney until December.

In January 2020, Georgie Gardner returned to presenting the Nine News Sydney bulletin on the weekends, replacing Knight, who went on to host the afternoon show on 2GB.

In December 2021, weekend sports presenter Erin Molan resigned from the network after 11 years. James Bracey was later announced as her replacement.

In March 2022, Cameron Williams resigned after 16 years at the Nine Network for personal reasons. James Bracey replaced Williams with Roz Kelly replacing Bracey as weekend sports presenter. In June 2025, Kelly resigned from the Nine Network to spend more time with her family.

In November 2025, it was announced that Amber Sherlock had been made redundant, one of several on air faces impacted by job cuts across Broadcast and Streaming Divisions.

In March 2026, Georgie Gardner announced her resignation after more than 20 years with the Nine Network, presenting her last bulletin in April.

In June 2026, Mark Burrows was appointed Friday and Saturday presenter, replacing Georgie Gardner.

Fill-in presenters for the bulletin include Jayne Azzopardi (news), Matt Burke and Zac Bailey (sport) and Kate Creedon, Sophie Walsh and Zara James (weather).

As of 2024, Nine News is more popular than Seven News. While both are competitive, Nine News Sydney consistently achieves the top ratings, sometimes for consecutive years. For example, Nine News Sydney held the top spot for the tenth consecutive year in 2020.

==== Melbourne ====
9News Melbourne is presented from the GTV studios in Docklands by Alicia Loxley (weeknights) and Peter Hitchener (weekends) with sport presented by Tony Jones (weeknights), Natalie Yoannidis (weekends) and weather presented by Scherri-Lee Biggs (weeknights) and Madeline Spark (weekends).

The Melbourne bulletin was originally presented by British expatriate newsreader Sir Eric Pearce, who had previously been a long time broadcaster at the BBC in England, after which he was replaced by Brian Naylor who presented National Nine News Melbourne for 20 years from 1978 following his resignation from HSV-7 to 1998.

Following his retirement, he was succeeded by Peter Hitchener as weeknight presenter, while Jo Hall took over from Hitchener as weekend presenter. Hall scaled back her work with Nine to news updates and fill-in duties in November 2011, with Weekend Today newsreader Alicia Loxley taking over as weekend presenter. Rob Gell formerly presented the weather until 2003, when he was replaced by Nixon; Gell subsequently defected to the rival Seven News Melbourne bulletin presenting the weather on weekends.

For many decades, Nine News Melbourne was the most dominant local news service, often drawing a peak audience of more than 400,000 viewers. However, in the mid-2000s, the bulletin started to lose ground to the rival Seven News Melbourne, winning only 24 (out of 40) weeks in 2006 and then narrowly losing in 2007 when it won 19 weeks (to Seven's 20 weeks, with the other week tied). Even during the years when Nine News struggled nationally, the Melbourne bulletin remained competitive, being the only metropolitan bulletin to win any weeks against Seven News in 2008 and 2009.

In March 2011, the GTV studios moved their base from Bendigo Street, Richmond, to a new building in Bourke Street, Docklands.

In December 2021, it was announced that Peter Hitchener would scale back to 4 days a week from January 2022 presenting from Monday to Thursday with Alicia Loxley presenting on Friday.

In November 2023, it was announced that Alicia Loxley and Tom Steinfort would replace Peter Hitchener to present on weeknights and Hitchener would move to weekends from January 2024.

In September 2026, Tom Steinfort was appointed co‑host of Today, and Nine announced that Alicia Loxley would continue presenting the news solo.

Fill-in presenters for the bulletin include Brett McLeod and Stephanie Anderson (news), Natalie Yoannidis, Trent Kniese and Owen Leonard (sport), Stephanie Anderson and Isabel Quinlan (weather).

==== Brisbane (Queensland statewide) ====
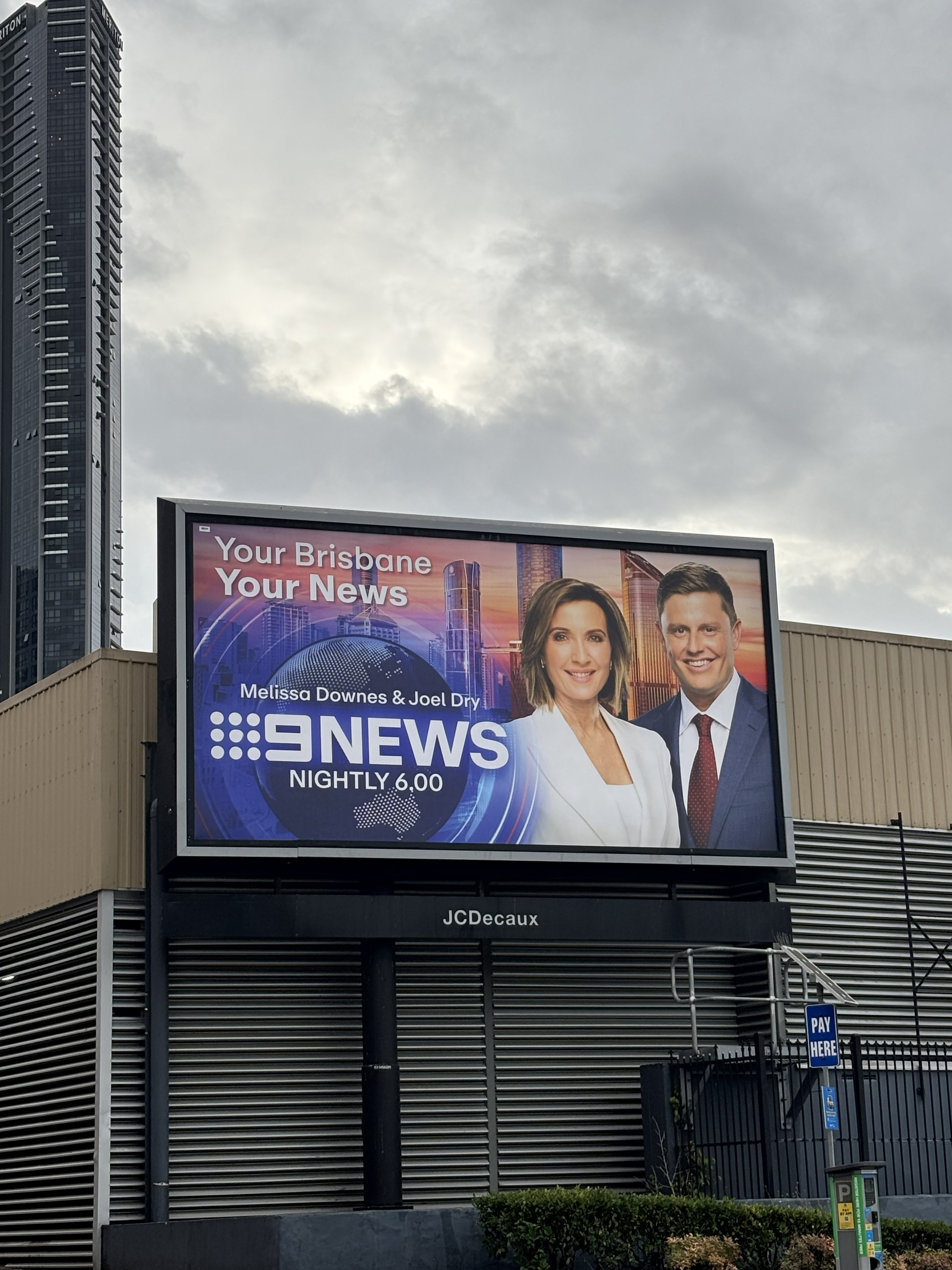
A promo for Nine News Queensland as seen on a billboard in Fortitude Valley, Queensland.

9News Queensland is presented from the QTQ studios in Mount Coot-tha by Melissa Downes and Joel Dry (weeknights) and Mia Glover (weekends) with sport presented by Bronte Gildea (weeknights) and Dominique Loudon (weekends) and weather presented by Garry Youngberry (Sunday–Thursday) and Luke Bradnam (Friday–Saturday).

The 6:00 pm bulletin is simulcast in Brisbane on commercial radio station River 94.9 and throughout remote eastern and central Australia on Imparja Television.

Bruce Paige and Heather Foord co-anchored the 6:00 pm bulletin from 1995 until 2001, when Foord joined Mike London as a weekend anchor and Jillian Whiting replaced her on weeknights. London resigned in June 2003 after allegations emerged that he had organized a female friend to complain about the presentation of weeknight anchor Bruce Paige.

Foord resigned as weeknight anchor on 5 December 2008 and was replaced by Melissa Downes on weeknights with Eva Milic and former ABC newsreader Andrew Lofthouse fronting weekend bulletins. A year later, Bruce Paige retired from the weeknight chair (he was replaced by Lofthouse) and Heather Foord returned to present weekend bulletins solo for two years.

In February 2018, in a minor network reshuffle, weekend presenters Darren Curtis and Alison Ariotti were removed from presenting the weekend news; they were replaced by Jonathan Uptin, the then-presenter of the regional Queensland bulletins.

Despite several position changes over the past three decades, as of 2026, 9News Queensland continues to retain a historic long-standing ratings lead ahead of 10 News Queensland and Seven News Brisbane dating back to the 1980s.

Paige returned to full-time news reading in January 2012, fronting Nine Gold Coast News solo until he was paired with Wendy Kingston in July 2016.

As of September 2017, the Brisbane weekend bulletins are simulcast in the Darwin area on weekends.

In January 2023, long-serving sports presenter Wally Lewis resigned from the role, citing health concerns. He was replaced by Jonathan Uptin. Mia Glover replaced Uptin as weekend news presenter.

In January 2025, Andrew Lofthouse announced his retirement effective immediately after 17 years with the network.

In May 2025, Nine announced that Joel Dry would return to the network, succeeding Andrew Lofthouse and joining Melissa Downes from 18 August.

==== Adelaide ====
9News Adelaide is presented from the NWS studios in Adelaide by Brenton Ragless (weeknights) and Will McDonald (weekends) with sport presented by Tom Rehn (weeknights) and Corey Norris (weekends) and weather presented by Jessica Braithwaite (weeknights) and Chelsea Carey (weekends).

The weeknight bulletins are simulcast on local radio station 107.9 Life FM and nightly across the Riverland and Southwest regions of South Australia on WIN Television SDS/RDS and is shown in the Spencer Gulf and Broken Hill in New South Wales on Nine GDS/BDN.

Rob Kelvin and Kevin Crease presented the Adelaide edition of National Nine News from 1988 until 2007, making them one of the longest serving news presenting teams in Australia, until Crease died of cancer in 2007. Caroline Ainslie previously presented the news with Kelvin until 1987. Georgina McGuinness was the weekend presenter between 1989 and 2011, during which her bulletins consistently rated higher than the rival Seven News Adelaide in its time slot.

In May 2018, long-standing news director Tony Agars was removed after fifteen years in the role.

In 2021, Nine News Adelaide began challenging and beating Seven News Adelaide in ratings for the 6:00 pm news and continued to do so in the weekend's bulletins as the team were "honoured that more and more South Australians are turning to us for their nightly news.”

Throughout the 1990s, Deanna Williams was the main fill-in presenter and state political reporter. Following Kevin Crease's death in 2007, Kelvin was partnered with Kelly Nestor, who left the network in 2009 following the termination of her contract. Kelvin retired on New Year's Eve 2010 but was brought out of retirement in 2014 as the presenter of the local afternoon news bulletin.

Kate Collins formerly presented the bulletin between 2011 and 2025, with Ragless joining her on the news desk in 2014, until she left the Nine Network in November 2025.

==== Perth ====
9News Perth is presented from the STW studios in Perth by Michael Thomson (weeknights) and Tracy Vo (weekends), sport presented by Paddy Sweeney (weeknights) and Alicia Molik (weekends) and weather presented by Natalia Cooper (Sunday–Wednesday) and Sarah Smith (Thursday–Saturday).

The 6:00 pm bulletin is simulcast each weekday on local radio station Sunshine 98.5 FM and nightly across regional Western Australia on WIN Television. Fill-in presenters include Tracy Vo and Natalia Cooper.

Dixie Marshall presented the weeknight bulletin between 2002 and May 2011, alongside Sonia Vinci as Australia's first duo female news presenting team for five years until early 2008, when Vinci was replaced by Greg Pearce. Natalia Cooper was a weather presenter for Nine News Perth until her resignation in June 2008.

In December 2019, it was announced that Nine Live Perth presenter Tracy Vo would move to Sydney to host Today as a news presenter. Louise Momber would appear on Monday, Tuesday, Wednesday and Jerrie Demasi would appear on Wednesday, Thursday and Friday presenting Nine Live Perth.

In March 2020, Vo returned to Perth due to the COVID-19 pandemic and continued to present the weekend bulletins, replacing Louise Momber.

Local weekend bulletins, Nine News Perth Saturday and Nine News Perth Sunday air at 6:00 pm. Sharlyn Sarac and Matt Tinney previously presented weekend bulletins until Sarac resigned in 2010. Tinney left a year later to present WIN News in regional Western Australia. Now, Tinney presents on TVW on Seven News Perth and Sunrise cut ins.

== Regional bulletins ==
=== Gold Coast ===
Nine Gold Coast News is a regional news service for the Gold Coast, presented by Eva Milic and Paul Taylor with sport presented by Mikayla Sorby and weather presented by Luke Bradnam, also additionally presents boating and fishing-related news. Launched in 1996, the bulletin airs at 5:30 pm (30 minutes) on weeknights on QTQ's Gold Coast transmitters, before the 6:00 pm Brisbane edition of Nine News. Produced from the network's studios at Surfers Paradise, the Gold Coast bulletin is also simulcast on local Gold Coast radio station Juice107.3. Tracey Atkins is the main fill-in news presenter, while Garry Youngberry is the main fill-in weather presenter.

Previous presenters of the bulletin have included Bruce Paige, Karl Stefanovic, Natalie Gruzlewski, Rob Readings, Jillian Whiting, Carly Waters, Frank Warrick, Melissa Downes, and Wendy Kingston. Paul Burt presented the weather until he joined Seven News Brisbane in 2013.

Until the launch of the rival Seven News Gold Coast service in July 2016, Nine was the only metropolitan network to produce a local bulletin for the Gold Coast. The Nine bulletin retained its ratings lead until July 2019, when the Seven bulletin officially became the number one news bulletin in the northern Gold Coast (the Gold Coast sub-region of the Brisbane market).

From 22 November 2024, Nine once again became the only metropolitan network to produce a local bulletin for the Gold Coast, after Seven Network announced the axing of its local Gold Coast bulletin after confirming a significant overhaul of its news operations on the Gold Coast, with that bulletin concluding operations after its final bulletin on 21 November 2024.

== Reporters ==
=== Federal Politics ===
Nine's Federal Politics bureau is based in Canberra, Australian Capital Territory under the direction of Bureau Chief Mark Jessop.

==== Current reporters ====
- Charles Croucher (Political Editor)
- Andrew Probyn (National Affairs Editor)
- Amalee Saunders
- Connor McGoverne

==== Former reporters ====
- Chris Uhlmann (2017–2022)
- Laurie Oakes (1984–2017)
- Peter Harvey (1973–1984)

=== US Bureau ===
==== Current reporters ====
- Lauren Tomasi
- Reid Butler
- Lily Greer

==== Former reporters ====
- Robert Penfold
- Karl Stefanovic
- Christine Spiteri
- Leila McKinnon
- Michael Usher
- Mark Burrows
- Laura Turner
- Alexis Daish
- Charles Croucher
- Nick McCallum
- Amelia Adams
- Tim Arvier
- Lizzie Pearl
- Alison Piotrowski
- Jonathan Kearsley

=== European Bureau ===
==== Current reporters ====
- Hannah Sinclair
- Josh Bavas
- Mimi Becker

==== Former reporters ====
- Robert Penfold
- Mark Burrows
- Clint Stanaway
- James Talia
- Damian Ryan
- Sophie Walsh
- Amelia Adams
- Tom Steinfort
- Carrie-Anne Greenbank
- Brett McLeod
- Edward Godfrey
- Jessica Millward

== Breakfast programs ==
=== Today ===
Today is a breakfast talk show, news, weather, and infotainment format broadcast weekdays from 5:30 am to 9:00 am, live from TCN studios in North Sydney and is hosted by Tom Steinfort and Sylvia Jeffreys with news presenter Jayne Azzopardi.

=== Today Extra ===
Today Extra is the network's morning talk show, hosted by David Campbell and Belinda Russell with news presenter Deborah Knight (Monday to Thursday) and Kate Creedon (Friday) from TCN studios in North Sydney. The show airs between 9:00 am and 11:30 am weekdays and follows the Nine Network's breakfast news program Today, with both programs closely interlinked.

=== Weekend Today ===
Weekend Today is broadcast weekends from 7:00 am to 10:00 am from TCN studios in North Sydney and is hosted by Michael Atkinson and Alison Piotrowski with news presenter Lizzie Pearl and weather presenter Dan Anstey.

== Current Affair programming ==
=== A Current Affair ===
A Current Affair is hosted from TCN studios in North Sydney from 7:00pm to 7:30pm by Allison Langdon (Monday to Friday) and Deborah Knight (Saturday).

=== 60 Minutes ===
60 Minutes is a news magazine program presented by Tara Brown, Amelia Adams, Adam Hegarty, and Dimity Clancey.

== Former programs ==
- Nightline (1992–2008, 2009–2010)
- Nine News: Sunday AM (2008–2009)
- Sunday (1981–2008)
- This Afternoon (2009)
- Financial Review Sunday (2013–2014)
- 9StreamLIVE (2013)

=== NBN News (prior to 2026) ===
NBN News is a regional news service for Northern NSW and Gold Coast that was part of Nine News, and now run by WIN Television airing from 5:30pm to 6:00pm five nights a week. The news service employed 60 staff and produced over 20,000 local news stories annually, with local stories in all of its sub-markets. It included local news stories over its half-hour long bulletin, with local opt outs for sport and weather.

NBN News traces its origins back to 1962, when the bulletin was launched from its historic Mosbri Crescent studios as a half hour news bulletin originally presented by Murray Finlay, who was NBN's first newsreader. A decade later, the bulletin was expanded to one hour and Ray Dinneen joined Finlay at the news desk. Dinneen eventually went on to become the main anchor and was joined over the years by Tracey Reid, Chris Bath, Melinda Smith, and finally Natasha Beyersdorf, before retiring on 17 December 2010 and was replaced by Paul Lobb. As an independent station, the bulletin had a distinct look to Nine News with its own studio, set, graphics, and theme music. Following the merging of NBN into Nine, the bulletins on air presentation was refreshed to bring into line with the network.

In 2021, after nearly 60 years of production, the bulletin was moved out of NBN's long time studio home of 11 Mosbri Crescent, The Hill and relocated to 28 Honeysuckle Drive, Newcastle. Following the relocation, the networks master control was relocated to QTQ Queensland, utilising the same master control that was used for Nine's regional Queensland bulletin between 2017 and 2021. Since the master control shift to Brisbane, NBN News effectively integrated with Nine News' metropolitan and Darwin counterparts, which includes retiring 60 years of unique theme music commissions, in favour of a variation of Cool Hand Luke's Tar Sequence being used by the metropolitan Nine News bulletins.

On 13 December 2021, it was announced that longtime anchor Paul Lobb would be made redundant after a decade as weeknight news presenter and almost 30 years with the network. Lobb left immediately after the announcement. Gavin Morris replaced Lobb as weeknight news presenter and one of the networks main male personalities in addition to presenting weather.

On 20 January 2023, weekend sports presenter Kate Haberfield announced her departure from the network after 14 years. She finished her role on the same night.

Following WIN’s acquisition of the station, as of Saturday 27 June 2026, local weekend editions of NBN News were replaced by Nine News at 6:00pm on both Saturday and Sunday nights. The broadcaster has also confirmed weekday local bulletins have moved to an earlier timeslot as of Monday 29 June 2026, with the half-hour local news service airing at 5:30pm, followed by Nine News at 6:00pm.

Following the sale of NBN to WIN, it was announced that NBN News were reduced from a one hour, seven days a week bulletin to a half an hour, Monday to Friday regional news program, airing at 5:30 pm, as of 29 June 2026. The final weekend edition of NBN News aired on 21 June 2026, and the final one hour edition of NBN News aired on 26 June 2026. The program remains at the NBN studios in Newcastle. Nine News currently airs in Northern NSW at 6 pm, seven days a week, as of 27 June 2026.

=== Nine News Darwin (1982–2025) ===
9News Darwin was a regional news service for Darwin, Palmerston and the surrounding areas, presented by Paul Murphy, with weather presented by rotating reporters in the Northern Territory.

Launched in 1982 as News at Seven, the bulletin aired at 6:00 pm weeknights on Nine's owned-and-operated station, NTD. Whilst the news reports were filed by reporters from the NTD newsroom in Darwin, it was presented live from the QTQ studios in Brisbane; this was as a result of the relocation of studio presentation in September 2017, after the bulletin was folded into its regional Queensland operations. Weekend bulletins were a delayed broadcast of 9News Queensland, with no local opt-outs. The weeknight bulletin was also simulcast on local Darwin radio station 104.1 Territory FM and on Imparja 9Gem in areas outside of NTD's broadcasting area.

Following the rollout of the regional composite bulletins as part of the affiliation relationship between Nine and Southern Cross Austereo in 2016, local studio production of the Darwin bulletin ceased on 8 September 2017, with the bulletin folded into the Brisbane-based regional Queensland operations. Darwin henceforth received a delayed broadcast of the Brisbane bulletin on weekends. Jonathan Uptin joined the regional Queensland bulletins, co-presenting alongside Samantha Heathwood upon the transfer. Between 11 September 2017 and 16 March 2020, the bulletin was pre-recorded and presented as a composite bulletin with regional Queensland, with opt-outs for local news, sport and weather.

In February 2018, Uptin ceased co-presenting the regional Queensland and Darwin bulletins and was moved to presenting the weekend news on the metropolitan Brisbane bulletin. In addition, he also became the weekday sports editor for the bulletin. Paul Taylor replaced Uptin as co-presenter alongside Heathwood while Paul Murphy was appointed to replace Taylor as sports presenter.

The Darwin bulletin was suspended, along with other regional composite bulletins, on 17 March 2020, due to the COVID-19 pandemic. On 5 October 2020, the bulletin was relaunched as a live, standalone bulletin from the QTQ studios.

Previous presenters of the bulletin have included Jonathan Uptin, Tim Arvier, and Charles Croucher. Uptin and Arvier are now both on 9News Queensland as the weeknight sports presenter and state political/investigative reporter, respectively, while Croucher is now Chief Political Editor.

On 22 January 2025, Nine announced that the Darwin edition of 9News would be axed effective immediately, with staff informed that same morning. The one-hour local bulletin, which had been presented from Brisbane with a local Darwin crew, was replaced by the Queensland state bulletin airing seven nights a week. According to a Nine spokesperson, the “difficult yet necessary” decision was made to “ensure Nine is able to withstand external challenges”.

As part of the restructure, three full-time roles were made redundant and eight other positions were redeployed. One reporter and one camera operator were retained in Darwin to produce stories for Nine’s national news bulletins. The final edition of 9News Darwin aired on 21 January 2025.

The closure drew criticism from media experts and public figures. University of Sydney Professor Catharine Lumby described the decision as “very concerning”, citing the importance of local journalism to democratic accountability, while NT Opposition Leader Selena Uibo called it a “significant gap” in the media landscape.

Following the cancellation, the ABC became the only network producing a locally based television news bulletin for the Northern Territory.

=== Nine News Local (2017–2021) ===
Under the 2016 agreement between Nine Network and Southern Cross Austereo, local news services were gradually introduced in 2017 to Southern Cross's regional Nine stations in Queensland, the Australian Capital Territory, southern New South Wales, and Victoria.

In August 2016, Queensland news director Mike Dalton was appointed as the head of the new "Nine News Regional" division, as announced by the director of Nine's news and current affairs division, Darren Wick. Until the launch of the bulletins, the coverage areas received short updates throughout the day, produced from Southern Cross's in-house newsroom in Canberra.

The bulletins were produced and presented from Nine's studio facilities in Brisbane, Sydney, and Melbourne. At launch, they were based on the format of Nine-owned NBN News in northern New South Wales. They combined international, national and state news, with pre-recorded opt-outs for local news, sport and weather for each individual market. On weekends, these regions received a simulcast of their respective metropolitan-based bulletins.

On 17 March 2020, production on the composite bulletins was suspended, due to the COVID-19 pandemic, with reporters deployed to the metropolitan bulletins in Sydney, Melbourne, and Brisbane. On 29 July 2020, it was announced that the bulletins would return on 10 August, but now as half-hour statewide regional news. This new format was broadcast weekdays at 5:30 pm as Nine News Local, leading into the metro-based bulletins at 6:00 pm. It was also announced that Natassia Soper would replace Vanessa O'Hanlon as presenter of the southern New South Wales and ACT bulletin, with Jo Hall and Samantha Heathwood returning to their respective regional bulletins.

Former affiliate WIN Television carried Nine programming from 1 July 2021, effectively replacing Nine Local News. The regional bulletins of Nine News Local in Queensland, southern NSW and Victoria aired for the final time on Wednesday 30 June 2021.

==== Southern New South Wales and ACT ====
The Southern New South Wales and ACT bulletin was presented by Natassia Soper from the TCN studios in North Sydney, with Gavin Morris presenting weather from the Mosbri Crescent studios in Newcastle (it had originally been presented from TCN's studios in Willoughby until the relocation in November 2020 to North Sydney.) The bulletin was also broadcast to regional viewers on CTC.

Fill-in presenters for the bulletin included Davina Smith, Jane Goldsmith (news/sport), and Hannah McEwan (weather).

The southern New South Wales and ACT bulletins were launched weekly throughout February 2017, starting with Canberra and ACT in the first week, followed by Wollongong and the Illawarra in the second week, then a Central West bulletin for Orange, Bathurst and Dubbo in the third week, and finally Wagga Wagga and the Riverina in the fourth week.

==== Regional Victoria ====
The regional Victorian bulletin was presented from the GTV studios in Docklands by Jo Hall, with weather presenter Gavin Morris at the Mosbri Crescent studios in Newcastle. The bulletin was also broadcast to regional viewers on GLV/BCV.

Fill-in presenters for the bulletin included Brett McLeod and Dougal Beatty (news/sport) and Hannah McEwan (weather).

The regional Victorian composite bulletins launched weekly throughout March 2017, starting with Ballarat and western Victoria on 6 March 2017, Bendigo and central Victoria in the second week, a Border North East bulletin for Albury–Wodonga and Shepparton in the third week, and finishing with the Gippsland bulletin in the fourth week.

Fill-in presenters between March 2017 and March 2020 included Brett McLeod, Dougal Beatty, Andrew Lund, Carrie-Anne Greenbank, Eliza Rugg, and Chris Kohler (news); Chris Mitchell, Clint Stanaway, and Sophie Griffiths (sport); and Alexandra Keefe, Hannah McEwan, and Sophie Griffiths (weather).

==== Regional Queensland ====
The regional Queensland bulletin was presented from the QTQ studios in Mount Coot-tha by Samantha Heathwood with weather presenter Gavin Morris at the Mosbri Crescent studios in Newcastle. The bulletin was also broadcast to regional viewers on TNQ.

The regional Queensland composite bulletins were launched throughout July and August 2017. They were originally presented solo by Samantha Heathwood, with sport presenter Paul Taylor and weather presenter Nicole Rowles. The Cairns and Far North Queensland bulletin launched first on 10 July 2017, followed by Townsville and North Queensland on 17 July 2017, Mackay on 24 July 2017, Rockhampton and Central Queensland on 31 July 2017, Wide Bay on 7 August 2017, Toowoomba and the Darling Downs on 14 August 2017, and finishing with the Sunshine Coast bulletin on 21 August 2017.

The composite bulletins for Mackay and Toowoomba/Darling Downs were axed on 15 February 2019. Starting on 18 February 2019, Toowoomba and the Darling Downs received the metropolitan Brisbane bulletin.

The regional Queensland composite bulletins between February 2018 and March 2020 were presented by Samantha Heathwood and Paul Taylor, with sport presenter Paul Murphy and weather presenter Nicole Rowles.

=== Nine News at 7 ===
Nine News at 7 was a short-lived bulletin that aired weeknights at 7:00 pm on Nine's high-definition multi-channel GEM (now 9Gem). The bulletin launched in August 2013 and was initially presented by Peter Overton from Monday to Thursday and Georgie Gardner on Friday, Later the bulletin was presented by Sylvia Jeffreys. It was launched both in response to the Seven Network's similar bulletin Seven News at 7.00 and to provide additional coverage of the unfolding 2013 federal election. The bulletin was axed on 28 October 2013.

=== Nine News Now ===
Nine News Now was a news magazine program for news coverage with entertainment news and topical discussions that aired at 3:00 pm on weekdays. It presented from the network's Sydney studios by Amber Sherlock (Monday–Thursday) and Belinda Russell (Friday).

The bulletin went on hiatus in November 2019, with UK game show Tipping Point airing in its place. The bulletin did not return upon the commencement of the 2020 ratings season.

=== 9NewsWatch ===
9NewsWatch was an online bulletin streamed on Facebook at 8:00 pm on weeknights, presented by Julie Snook. The bulletin premiered in August 2019 when the Nine Network announced its partnership with Facebook. Previously this bulletin was presented by Sylvia Jeffreys.

=== Ninemsn newsroom ===
Ninemsn newsroom was an online bulletin streamed at 12:30 pm on weekdays, presented from Sydney. The bulletin was also available to be downloaded as a vodcast from the Ninemsn newsroom website. The bulletin was cancelled and replaced in 2013 with Nine News Now which airs on the network at 3:00 pm.

=== Nine Newsbreak ===
Nine Newsbreak is an iPhone and iPad app that was launched in 2011. The app is constantly updated with videos from Nine's newsrooms around the country and overseas along with specially produced 60-second video reports and full video packages taken from Nine News bulletins. The app also includes a user-generated content feature that allows consumers to take photos or videos and send them directly to Nine's newsrooms. In 2013, Nine Newsbreak was merged into the Nine Network's 9Now app.

== Presenters ==
National

- Jayne Azzopardi
- Deborah Knight
- Lizzie Pearl
- Peter Overton
- Tracy Vo

State-based

- Peter Overton
- Mark Burrows
- Melissa Downes
- Joel Dry
- Mia Glover
- Alison Ariotti
- Paul Taylor
- Eva Milic
- Peter Hitchener
- Alicia Loxley
- Brenton Ragless
- Will McDonald
- Michael Thomson
- Tracy Vo

NBN News

- Natasha Beyersdorf

Sport

- James Bracey
- Zac Bailey
- Bronte Gildea
- Dominique Loudon
- Tony Jones
- Nat Yoannidis
- Tom Rehn
- Corey Norris
- Paddy Sweeney
- Alicia Molik

Weather

- Garry Youngberry
- Luke Bradnam
- Scherri-Lee Biggs
- Madeline Spark
- Jessica Braithwaite
- Natalia Cooper

Past

- Mike Bailey
- Stephanie Brantz
- Paul Burt
- Kate Collins
- Anna Coren
- Deborah Knight
- Kevin Crease
- Kym Dillon
- Ellen Fanning
- Mark Ferguson
- Heather Foord
- Sharyn Ghidella
- Troy Grey
- Ross Greenwood
- Tim Gilbert
- Natalie Gruzlewski
- Grant Hackett
- Sarah Harris
- Steven Jacobs
- Peter Harvey
- Brian Henderson
- Peter Holland
- Rebecca Judd
- Helen Kapalos
- Rob Kelvin
- Wendy Kingston
- Emmy Kubainski
- Wally Lewis
- Mike London
- Andrew Lofthouse
- Georgina McGuinness
- Dixie Marshall
- Keith Martyn
- Tim McMillan
- Xavier Minniecon
- Mike Munro
- Erin Molan
- Brian Naylor
- Kelly Nestor
- Livinia Nixon
- Vanessa O'Hanlon
- Bruce Paige
- Sir Eric Pearce
- Greg Pearce
- Mark Readings
- Hugh Riminton
- Ian Ross
- Sally Ayhan
- Yvonne Sampson
- Sharlyn Sarac
- Jaynie Seal
- Tim Sheridan
- Amber Sherlock
- Kellie Sloane
- Michael Smyth
- Clint Stanaway
- Ken Sutcliffe
- Warren Tredrea
- Matt Tinney
- Michael Usher
- Jim Waley
- Kim Watkins
- Jana Wendt
- Jillian Whiting
- Alan Wilkie
- Cameron Williams
- Majella Wiemers

== See also ==
- Wotton v Queensland (No 5) § Alleged vilification by 9News and Daily Mail, 2020
