= Telestory =

- Presented by: Leonard Teale; Gordon Glenwright
- Country of origin: Australia
- Original language: English
- No. of seasons: 2

Production
- Running time: 15 minutes
- Production company: Artransa Park

Original release
- Network: ATN-7
- Release: 1961 – 1962

Telestory is an Australian television series which aired 1961–1962. Produced by Artransa Park and aired on ATN-7, it was a 15-minute series in which an actor would read from a book. The first season consisted of Leonard Teale reading The Sundowners, while the second season consisted of Gordon Glenwright reading from They're a Weird Mob. Very basic television, it aired towards the end of the day's schedule, at time slots such as 10:10PM on Monday and 11:35PM on Friday. Additional episodes were planned but do not seem to have been produced.

The version of The Sundowners utilised stills from the film to illustrate the story.

A similar series was produced in Melbourne during 1961 called Let Me Read to You.
