= Tracy Vo =

Australian journalist, television presenter and author

- Born: Perth, Western Australia, Australia
- Education: Hollywood Senior High School; Curtin University
- Occupations: Journalist; former radio presenter; TV news presenter; TV reporter; author
- Employer: Nine Network
- Spouse: Liam Connolly (2023–present)

Tracy Vo is an Australian journalist, radio and television news presenter and reporter and author. Vo is currently the weekend news presenter for Nine News in Perth.

== Early life ==
Vo grew up in Perth and completed her schooling at Our Lady of Lourdes Catholic Primary School at Nollamara and Hollywood Senior High School. She obtained a Bachelor of Arts from Curtin University. Vo's parents were Vietnamese boat people.

== Career ==
Vo's early career included stints at Sydney radio station 2SM, and Sky News Australia.

Vo subsequently started in television and joined the Nine Network firstly in Sydney at TCN in 2007 where she remained until 2012, after which she returned to Perth for personal reasons, and commenced working as a journalist at the Nine Network Perth.

In 2014, Vo published a book entitled Small Bamboo, which detailed her parents' arrival in Australia in the late 1970s as Vietnamese boat people following the Vietnam War.

In 2016, Vo was appointed news presenter on local Today Perth presenting live half-hourly local news bulletins throughout the time-delayed broadcast of national breakfast show, Today. She remained in the position until 2018 when she was appointed presenter of the Nine Network's local afternoon program, Nine Live Perth.

In December 2019, it was announced Vo had been appointed the news presenter on the network's national breakfast show, Today. She commenced this role on 6 January 2020. As a Vietnamese-Australian, Vo's appointment meant she became one of only a few Asian faces on commercial television in Australia. Nine's decision to appoint Vo to such a prominent role at the network was met with praise, and was described by one media outlet as "symbolic of progress towards greater media representation of Australia's multicultural population".

In March 2020, Vo permanently returned to Perth due to the COVID-19 pandemic. On her return to Perth, Vo replaced Louise Momber as weekend presenter of Nine News Perth. Alex Cullen replaced Vo on Today presenting both news and sport.

== Personal life ==
Vo and her husband Liam Connolly had their first child, a daughter, on October 2, 2025.
