= Alicia Loxley =

Australian journalist (born 1981)

- Born: Alicia Gorey; 19 September 1981 (age 45); Melbourne, Victoria, Australia
- Occupations: Journalist, news presenter
- Years active: 2003−present
- Employer: Nine Network
- Television: Nine News
- Spouse: Kane Loxley
- Children: 3

Alicia Loxley (née Gorey) (born 19 September 1981) is an Australian journalist and news presenter.

Loxley is currently the weeknight news presenter on Nine News Melbourne.

== Career ==
In July 2008, Loxley joined Nine News Melbourne as a reporter.

In June 2010, she relocated to Sydney, where she replaced Amber Sherlock on Weekend Today as news presenter and was also the Monday news presenter on Today, as Georgie Gardner presents Nine News Sydney on Friday and Saturday.

In November 2011, it was announced that Loxley would replace Jo Hall as weekend news presenter on Nine News Melbourne.

In November 2023, it was announced that Loxley and Tom Steinfort would replace Peter Hitchener to present on weeknights and Hitchener moved to weekends from January 2024.

== Personal life ==
Loxley married in 2012, and has three children.
