= Robert Penfold =

Australian journalist

Robert Maxwell Penfold AM is an Australian television reporter and journalist, who served as Foreign Correspondent for Australia's Nine News.

== Early career ==
Penfold started his career as a cadet journalist on the Macarthur Advertiser and Campbelltown-Ingleburn News, local newspapers in his hometown of Campbelltown, New South Wales. He moved into broadcast journalism, working at the local radio and TV station in Tamworth, New South Wales.

== Broadcasting career ==
During his reporting career Penfold worked at all three Australian commercial TV networks in Sydney and Melbourne. While working for Ten News in Melbourne, he was one of the first reporters into Darwin after Cyclone Tracy destroyed the city on Christmas Day in 1974.

He covered the Granville rail disaster as a Nine Network reporter and toured Australia covering the first visit of Prince Charles and Princess Diana and new baby Prince William. During his career at Nine Network, Penfold has worked for Nine News, A Current Affair, Today (appearing on the first show in 1982) and Sunday.

From 1985 to 1987, he was based in Nine's North American Bureau reporting on Ronald Reagan's presidency and covered the Space Shuttle Challenger disaster.

Penfold moved to the United Kingdom for the Nine Network in 1987. During his time in Europe, he covered the IRA's war against the British, the divorce of Prince Charles and Princess Diana, and the hunt for Australia's most-wanted man at the time, mafia boss Robert Trimboli.

Penfold also reported on America's unsuccessful attempt to bring peace to Somalia and the triumphant march to freedom by Nelson Mandela. Memorable moments include live reports from Mandela's house in Soweto and the fall of the Berlin Wall on 9 November 1989.

Penfold reported from the former Yugoslavia during the Balkan Conflict in the early 90s. In 1991, he was one of the first reporters into Kuwait City in the First Gulf War. Earlier, he reported from Baghdad as the Australian Government attempted to negotiate the freedom of Australians trapped in the region.

Penfold spent two years in Australia as head of the A Current Affair office in Melbourne.

He returned to Los Angeles, California in 1997 as North American Bureau Chief for the Nine Network. During his time as Channel Nine's U.S. correspondent, Penfold has reported on the Bill Clinton, George W. Bush, Barack Obama and Donald Trump presidencies, the 11 September terrorist attacks on America, the earthquake in Haiti, and the 33 miners trapped in Chile. He also spent time with the Australian Army as he reported on the Iraq War and the Australian military's role in Iraq.

Penfold announced his retirement from the role of Nine Network's US Correspondent and Bureau Chief in June 2019, and his final broadcast tribute aired on the 6pm evening bulletin on 30 June 2019. Robert wrote this article on his thoughts about retiring.

In 2020, Penfold took on the role of head of Global Media Relations for the Meridian Rapid Defense Group.

== Awards ==
During his career, Penfold has won several awards for his reporting. He won the Thorn Award for his coverage of a deadly fire in Sydney, a Penguin Award from the Television Society of Australia for his coverage of a murderous attack on mourners during an IRA funeral in Belfast, a Logie for his contribution from Monte Carlo to Nine News coverage of Sydney winning the bid for the 2000 Summer Olympics and a Walkley commendation for his story of coming under fire in Iraq. In 2006, he was awarded Australia's most prestigious journalism prize, the Walkley Award for TV News Reporting for his coverage of the Hurricane Katrina disaster in New Orleans.

In the 2020 Australia Day Honours, Penfold was appointed a Member of the Order of Australia (AM) for "significant service to the broadcast media, and to journalism".
