= Alison Ariotti =

Australian journalist and news presenter

- Born: 1980 (age 45–46); Kingscliff, New South Wales, Australia
- Education: Queensland University of Technology
- Occupations: Journalist and news presenter
- Years active: 2000–present
- Employer: Nine Network
- Television: Nine News
- Spouse: Gerry Ariotti (m. 2011)
- Children: 3

Alison Ariotti (nee Fletcher, born 1980) is an Australian journalist and news presenter.

== Career ==
Ariotti's media career began at NBN in Northern New South Wales where she worked casually as a reporter. In 2000, she was appointed to WIN News as a reporter in Cairns and later moved to WIN News on the Sunshine Coast. Ariotti later moved back to Cairns and was appointed as chief of staff for WIN television.

In October 2004, Ariotti joined the Nine Network and was appointed a reporter and producer on Nine Gold Coast News. She then moved to Brisbane in 2007 became a reporter and producer on Nine News Queensland.

In 2009, Ariotti was appointed Queensland reporter on Today. She was replaced by Aislin Kriukelis in May 2013. In January 2014, Ariotti moved to Sydney and filled in for Wendy Kingston on Nine News Now whilst she was on maternity leave. In September 2014, Ariotti returned to Brisbane and was appointed co-weekend presenter for Nine News Queensland replacing Eva Milic. She also presents the Friday edition of Nine Live Queensland.

As of 2018, Ariotti presents Nine's Afternoon News Queensland from Wednesday to Friday.

== Personal life ==
Ariotti was educated at Kingscliff High School and later graduated from Queensland University of Technology with a Bachelor of Arts (Journalism) degree in 2000. In July 2011, she married anaesthetist Gerry Ariotti in Kingscliff. They have two daughters, and a son.

Media offices
Preceded by Bulletin introduced Eva Milic	Nine's Afternoon News Queensland; Friday presenter Wednesday to Friday presenter October 2014 – December 2017; January 2018 – present	Succeeded by Incumbent
Preceded by Eva Milic	Nine News Queensland; Weekend presenter with Darren Curtis; October 2014 – December 2017	Succeeded by Jonathan Uptin
Preceded by Bulletin introduced	Nine Morning News: Queensland Edition; Friday presenter October 2014 – 2 October 2017	Succeeded by Bulletin discontinued
Preceded by Wendy Kingston	Nine News Now; Presenter; January 2014 – August 2014	Succeeded by Amelia Adams
