= Georgina McGuinness =

Australian journalist and news presenter (born 1966)

Georgina McGuinness (née Allan, formerly Thomas) is an Australian newsreader. She was the anchor of Nine News Adelaide's weekend 6pm news bulletin from 1989 to 2011.

== Early life ==
An Adelaide native, born 29 August 1966, she studied at Seymour College and at the Magill campus of the South Australian College of Advanced Education (now a part of the University of South Australia).

== Career ==
She graduated in 1987 and joined Nine News as a reporter. Just a year later, she was appointed weekend news anchor, which job she continued to 2011, along with filing special reports. During this time, her bulletins consistently rated higher than the rival Seven News Adelaide in its timeslot.

In October 2011, it was announced that McGuinness would not have her contract renewed with the Nine Network. In early 2012, McGuinness joined the staff of South Australian Opposition Leader Isobel Redmond as a speechwriter.

== Personal life ==
After a number of years presenting as both Georgina Allan, and later Georgina Thomas, she married former Adelaide Crows captain Tony McGuinness in 1999. She is the mother of four children, with 3 children from a previous marriage.

One of her pastimes is marathon running. She has run marathons in Amsterdam, Berlin and London.

Media offices
Preceded by Unknown	Nine News Adelaide; Weekend presenter 1989–2011	Succeeded by Will McDonald
Preceded by Originator	A Current Affair presenter 2002	Succeeded by Kate Collins (2008)
