= Jo Hall =

Australian television presenter (born 1958)

- Born: 25 June 1958 (age 68); Melbourne, Victoria, Australia
- Occupation: News presenter
- Years active: 1978−present
- Employer: Nine Network
- Spouse: Jason Danda
- Children: 4
- Website: Nine News profile

Jo Hall (born 25 June 1958) is an Australian television presenter.

Hall is a feature story reporter for Nine News.

== Career ==
Hall began her career with a Melbourne newspaper cadetship, then joined Nine News in 1979. In 1990 she became the first woman to be presented with the Thorn Award, a national award for journalism.

She presented Nine News Melbourne on weekends for 13 years and has filled in for Peter Hitchener. Hall also presented national Nine News late news update on weekends. She also works with the Variety Club on McHappy Day and is a patron of Bonnie Babes, a research organisation.

In November 2011, it was announced that Hall wanted to scale back her role, with Alicia Loxley replacing her as weekend news presenter.

In November 2016, it was announced Hall would host four new Nine News Victoria regional bulletins – Nine News Western Victoria, Nine News Central Victoria, Nine News Border North East and Nine News Gippsland – from Nine's Melbourne studios but featuring news, sport and weather reports from reporters in Ballarat, Bendigo, Albury-Wodonga, Shepparton and Traralgon.

In February 2017, Hall joined 3AW to host an hour-long chat program, Great Australian Lives.

== Personal life ==
She attended Koonung Secondary College in Mont Albert North.

Hall has four children with her former husband, Jason Danda. She lives in Melbourne’s inner east and is a Collingwood supporter.

Media offices
Preceded by Originator	Nine News Victoria; Presenter; March 2017 – June 2021	Succeeded by Axed
Preceded by Peter Hitchener	Nine News Melbourne; Weekend presenter 1998–2011	Succeeded by Alicia Loxley
