= Cameron Williams =

Australian journalist (born 1963)

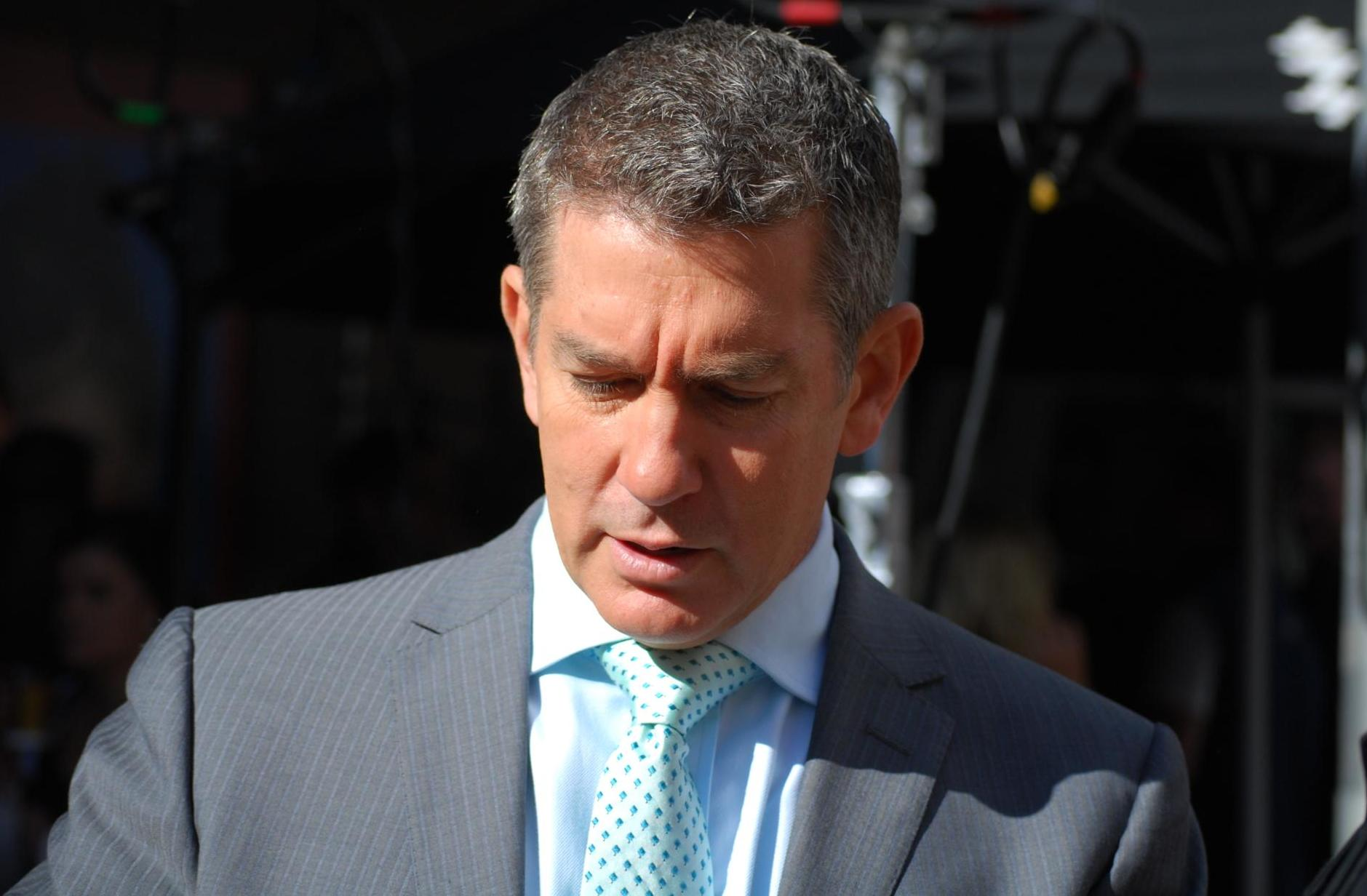
- Born: 18 February 1963 (age 63); Emerald, Queensland, Australia
- Occupation: Television presenter
- Years active: 1984−present
- Television: Nine News; Australian Open
- Children: 2

Cameron Williams (born 18 February 1963 in Emerald, Queensland) is an Australian television journalist and presenter, most notably with the Nine Network.

Williams has previously been a sport presenter on Nine News Sydney from Sunday to Thursday, co-hosted Weekend Today and been sports presenter on Today. He was also a roving reporting at the Australian Open for the network's coverage.

== Career ==
Williams's journalism career began in 1984 with a cadetship at The Courier-Mail newspaper in Brisbane. From there he moved to The Australian offices in Melbourne, where he wrote sports features and columns before joining the Seven Network in 1988. Apart from his role as a sports presenter on Seven News, Williams occasionally hosted Sportsworld. He was a presenter for the 1992 Barcelona Olympics, where he called Matt Ryan's equestrian double gold for Australia.

In 1996, he signed as the face of Fox Sports, anchoring NRL On Fox, Dally M Awards, Super 12 Rugby, Wimbledon, Winter Olympics, the Australian Motorcycle Grand Prix and Fox Sports News. In 2001, amid scandal, Fox Sports declined to renew his contract.

After this, Williams was a breakfast announcer at 2HD in Newcastle. Williams also owns a Newcastle modelling and talent agency, Models and Actors.

=== Nine Network ===
Williams was the official sports editor/presenter on the Nine Network's breakfast programme, Today from January 2006 until December 2010. He also occasionally presented the Nine Network's coverage of horse racing, swimming and other sporting events.

In 2010, Williams joined Nine News Sydney as Friday and Saturday sport presenter replacing Tim Sheridan.

In January 2011, Cameron was replaced by Ben Fordham on Today, he will now concentrate on Weekend Today.

Cameron presented Nine's coverage of Friday Night Football from 2013 to 2015. He also hosted the network's coverage of the 2015 Rugby World Cup.

In February 2016, Williams announced his resignation from the Nine Network.

In December 2016, he rejoined the Nine Network as sport editor on Nine News Sydney following the retirement of veteran sports presenter Ken Sutcliffe.

In March 2022, Williams announced his resignation from the Nine Network, so he can focus on his health and to pursue other opportunities.

In November 2022, Williams was charged with a domestic violence offence.
