= Brian Naylor (broadcaster) =

Australian journalist (1931–2009)

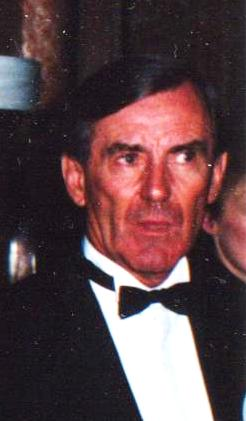
- Naylor in 1991
- Born: Brian Norman Naylor; 21 January 1931; Melbourne, Victoria, Australia
- Died: 7 February 2009 (aged 78); Kinglake West, Victoria, Australia
- Occupations: Television presenter, newsreader, radio presenter
- Years active: 1956–1998
- Known for: Seven National News; National Nine News; Carols by Candlelight
- Spouse: Moiree Naylor (?–2009)
- Children: Greg Naylor (son, 1954/5), Clinton Naylor (son), Jane Bayliss (nee Naylor, daughter), Trudee Lapthorne (nee Naylor, daughter), Matthew Naylor (son, deceased; 1967–2008)
- Awards: Victorian Father of the Year; 1988

Brian Norman Naylor (21 January 1931 – 7 February 2009) was an Australian television broadcaster and presenter, best known for his longstanding stint as chief news presenter at Seven Network (HSV-7) from 1970 to 1978 and for Nine Network (GTV-9) from 1978 to 1998 and his sign-off line, "May your news be good news, and good-night."

== Early life ==
Naylor was born on 21 January 1931. He grew up in Melbourne, initially attending Melbourne High School until the onset of World War II, when he was relocated to Camberwell High School, along with all of the students at his school. Completing his schooling in Form 5 (Year 11), his first job was as a production cadet at the Australian Paper Manufacturers. Naylor left APM when his manager started Woodweev Blinds, a blinds manufacturer, for which Naylor produced the original radio advertisement. It was from there that he was to start his career in the media.

== Radio broadcasting ==
In 1956, when Woodweev Blinds needed someone to provide a voice for their radio commercials, Naylor was "co-opted" into the role – reportedly because his voice made him sound like "a nice family sort of fellow". This led to a two-year stint as the radio presenter of the company's program on radio station 3AK. Two years after starting with 3AK, Naylor joined Melbourne radio station 3DB where he worked with Ernie Sigley as a radio announcer and host of a children's talent program, Swallow's Juniors.

== Television broadcasting and presenting ==
In 1958, Naylor moved to Melbourne television station HSV-7, transferring Swallow's Juniors to television where it was renamed Brian and the Juniors. Running until 1969, it provided a stepping stone for performers such as Debra Byrne, Rod Kirkham, Jane Scali, Peter Doyle, Patti Newton, Anne Watt, Vikki Broughton and Jamie Redfern. Naylor also hosted the SSB Adventure Club in the early 1960s with Madeleine Burke, and appeared as a regular on the station's daytime variety program Time For Terry in 1965.

He became HSV-7's chief news presenter in 1970, replacing Geoff Raymond. Naylor switched to GTV-9 in 1978 and replaced Sir Eric Pearce as chief news presenter. He presented the Melbourne edition of National Nine News until he retired from this position on 27 November 1998. He was replaced by Peter Hitchener.

== Further hosting ==
In his time at Nine, Naylor also hosted Carols by Candlelight from the Sidney Myer Music Bowl ten times. He won the 1988 Victorian Father of the Year Award. A patron of several organisations (the Variety Club in Victoria, the Dialysis and Transplant Association of Victoria and the Jack Brockhoff Reconstructive Plastic Surgery Research Unit of Royal Melbourne Hospital), Naylor also assisted with fundraising for the Macfarlane Burnet Appeal and Windana Society Drug Rehabilitation.

== Death ==
On 7 February 2009, Naylor and his wife Moiree were killed as one of the Black Saturday bushfires destroyed their property in Kinglake West, Victoria. This came only a few months after Naylor's son Matthew was killed in a plane crash in Kinglake, Victoria, on 29 May 2008, aged 41.

== Logies Hall of Fame ==
Naylor was posthumously inducted into the TV Week Logie Awards Hall of Fame at the 2010 Logie Awards.
