= Peter Hitchener =

Australian television news presenter (born 1946)

Peter Hitchener OAM
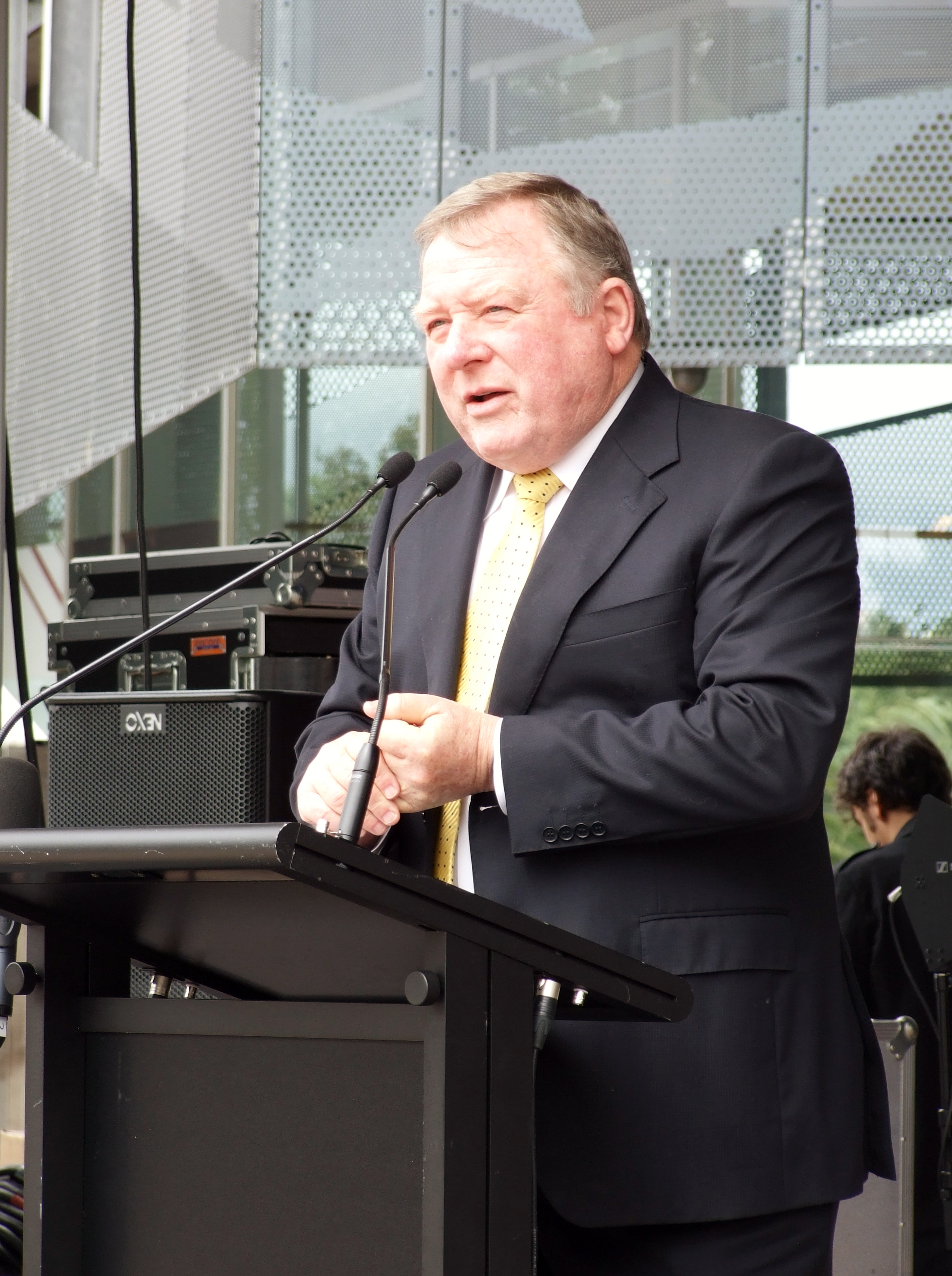
- Hitchener at the 2012 U3A Carnival of Learning at Federation Square, Melbourne
- Born: Peter Donald Beauchamp Hitchener; 21 February 1946 (age 80); Texas, Queensland, Australia
- Occupation: Television news presenter
- Years active: 1965–present
- Employer: Nine Network
- Television: Nine News
- Website: peterhitchener.com.au

Peter Donald Beauchamp Hitchener (born 21 February 1946) is an Australian television news presenter with a 52-year career with the Nine Network and 60 years of news broadcasting experience. Hitchener is currently weekend presenter of Nine News Melbourne. He was chief news presenter of Nine News Melbourne from 1998 until 2023.

== Career ==
Originally from Texas in outback Queensland, Hitchener began his media career in 1965 at the Brisbane radio station 4BH where he wrote, edited and presented news bulletins. Hitchener then moved on to ABC Brisbane, where he undertook roles as a television news and radio presenter. Still at the ABC, he moved to Sydney in 1973, where he was a relief presenter on the evening news for James Dibble.

Hitchener moved to the Nine Network after one year at ABC Sydney, presenting National Nine News first in Sydney and then in Melbourne as the co-anchor of News Centre Nine, with Brian Henderson co-anchoring in Sydney. In 1977, Hitchener began hosting the breakfast show on 3AW before moving to 3AK in 1979. At about this time, Hitchener also became chief weekend news presenter and understudy to chief weeknight news presenter Brian Naylor. In 1985, Hitchener resigned from 3AK.

When Brian Naylor retired in 1998, Hitchener took over as presenter of Nine News Melbourne on weeknights. In 2008, Hitchener celebrated 10 years as the weeknight news presenter.

In January 2013, the Nine Network celebrated Hitchener's 40-year career with the network at a gala dinner where many speakers paid tribute to his work in news and the community. In July 2014, it was announced Hitchener had signed a new contract to remain presenter of Nine News, believed to be for five years.

On 29 March 2021, Hitchener was reading the news bulletin when he suddenly fell ill and was unable to read the teleprompter, causing him to go home mid-broadcast. Hitchener was subsequently revealed to have been suffering a migraine, and was replaced by Alicia Loxley for the following night's bulletin.

In December 2021, it was announced that Hitchener would scale back to four days a week from January 2022, presenting from Monday to Thursday, with Alicia Loxley presenting on Friday.

In February 2022, Hitchener was announced as a Moomba Monarch alongside Fifi Box.

In November 2023, it was announced that Alicia Loxley and Tom Steinfort would replace Hitchener to present on weeknights and Hitchener will move to weekends from January 2024.

== Charity and community work ==
In 1998, Hitchener became the patron and active supporter of Able Australia (formerly the Deaf Blind Society of Victoria), an organisation supporting people with multiple disabilities. Since 2011, he has been the patron of Dogs Victoria, an organisation representing breeders and owners of pure-bred dogs in Victoria. He is also an Ambassador for the Lort Smith Animal Hospital. In addition, he is a regular supporter and guest speaker for many other charity and community events in Melbourne.

== Honours ==
Hitchener was awarded the Medal of the Order of Australia (OAM) in the 2017 Australia Day Honours list "For service to the broadcast media as a journalist and television presenter, and to the community".

== Personal life ==
For a short time, Hitchener lived in Eltham during the 1970s.

In April 2008, in a Herald Sun article regarding his 10 years as chief news presenter of Nine News Melbourne, Hitchener acknowledged he is gay. Online commentators criticised the circumstances of Hitchener's personal revelations, saying that he was "pushed" into discussing his private life. Hitchener's spokesperson denied this.

== See also ==
- List of Australian TV news presenters year by year

Media offices
Preceded by Brian Naylor	Nine News Melbourne; Weeknight presenter 1998 – 2023	Succeeded by Alicia Loxley & Tom Steinfort
Preceded by Unknown; Alicia Loxley	Nine News Melbourne; Weekend presenter 1978 – 1998; 2023 – present	Succeeded by Jo Hall; Incumbent
