= Wendy Kingston =

Australian journalist and television news presenter

- Occupations: Journalist, news presenter
- Years active: 2000–2021
- Employer: Nine Network
- Television: Nine News
- Children: 5

Wendy Kingston is an Australian former journalist and television news presenter.

Kingston was previously a presenter of Nine Afternoon News Queensland, as well as other national bulletins from Sydney.

== Career ==
Kingston's media career began in 2000 working as a reporter and newsreader for ABC Radio Brisbane, before moving to ABC Radio Rockhampton. In 2001, she moved to WIN News as reporter and fill-in newsreader for the Toowoomba bulletin. After six-months, Kingston was appointed as full-time presenter of the Toowoomba and Sunshine Coast WIN News bulletins.

In 2005, Kingston resigned from WIN and moved to Sydney, where she was picked up by the Nine Network to report for Nine News in Sydney.

In January 2013, Kingston was appointed presenter of Nine News Now, a bulletin that includes a mix of news, sport, panel discussions and showbiz. She returned from maternity leave, as a result.

In June 2016, Kingston was appointed presenter of Nine Gold Coast News alongside Bruce Paige.

In July 2021, Kingston resigned from the Nine Network to spend more time with her children, her last day was on 17 August.

== Personal life ==
Kingston graduated from Somerset College on the Gold Coast in 1998, and attended Bond University, where she obtained a degree in Journalism in 2003. She has 5 children.
