= 2025 in Australian television =

This is a list of Australian television-related events, debuts, finales, and cancellations that were scheduled to occur in 2025, the 70th year of continuous operation of television in Australia.

== Events ==
=== January ===
Date	Event	Source
1	The ABC's coverage of the annual midnight Sydney New Year's Eve fireworks is watched by 1,968,000 viewers, with Robbie Williams headlining the concert live from the Sydney Opera House alongside other artists including Nooky.	
5	Nine Entertainment announces that Rory Sloane will join the media company in 2025, as a panelist on AFL program Footy Classified.	
15	It is announced that the Seven Network have secured the rights to screen LIV Golf coverage for the foreseeable future.	
15	Nine Entertainment appoints Amanda Laing as the MD of the company's streaming and linear broadcast division, as part of an operating model restructure. Stan executive Martin Kugeler is made redundant.	
16	Network 10 confirms that Michael Hing will not return to The Project panel in 2025, as Hing is doing a comedy tour. The network also confirms a decrease to the Friday panel of The Project with Rove McManus, Georgie Tunny, and Susie Youssef debuting in February.	
17	Today presenter Alex Cullen reportedly accepts a $50,000 prize from billionaire Adrian Portelli for referring to him by his new moniker "McLaren Guy" live on air. He agrees to stand down the next day.	
20	James Glenday begins co-hosting the ABC's breakfast program News Breakfast, succeeding Michael Rowland. Catherine Murphy also begins as the program's permanent sport presenter, succeeding Tony Armstrong.	
20	The first edition of Seven National News at Noon airs on the Seven Network. The program is presented by Natarsha Belling.	
20	Andrew Lofthouse announces his retirement from presenting Nine News Queensland after 17 years to focus on his health, effective immediately.	
22	The Nine Network confirms Nine News Darwin would be axed effective immediately. One reporter and one camera operator will remain in Darwin bringing NT stories, aimed at a national audience. It is also confirmed the Gold Coast bulletin will now be presented by a single newsreader, with Paul Taylor and Eva Milic splitting across the week.	
22	The Seven Network announces it has secured the rights to broadcast the Academy Awards from 2026 until 2028, by extending its agreement with Disney Entertainment.	
23	Today presenter Alex Cullen agrees that he will leave the Nine Network after a controversy into Cullen reportedly accepting a $50,000 cash prize from billionaire Adrian Portelli for referring to him by his new moniker "McLaren Guy" live on air, instead of "Lambo Guy". Cullen was with the network for five years.	
24	Rick Ardon and Susannah Carr celebrate 40 years on air together reading the news together on TVW.	
29	The Seven Network confirms the coaches for the 14th season of The Voice, with only Kate Miller-Heidke returning from the previous season. At the same time, it was announced that Ronan Keating would return to the panel after an eight-season hiatus, while former The Voice Kids UK coach Melanie C and Richard Marx would debut as coaches.	
30	7.30's Sarah Ferguson is reportedly named as Australia's most popular television host in a StudioHawk study based on a "popularity score" calculated from Instagram followers and the amount of searches, beating Edwina Bartholomew (2nd place), Karl Stefanovic (3rd), Sarah Harris (4th) and Natalie Barr (5th). The research study later turned out to have mistakes, as StudioHawk confused Ferguson (the host) with former Royal, Sarah Ferguson, making Bartholomew the most popular.	

=== February ===
Date	Event	Source
1	Sonia Marinelli announces she has departed the Seven Network after 4 years presenting the weekend weather for Seven's Melbourne station, being replaced by Tyra Stowers on the same day.	
2	Offsiders returns to ABC TV for its twentieth season, with new host Abbey Gelmi.	
2	The tenth season of Australian Idol debuts on the Seven Network.	
2	The third season of ABC TV's Muster Dogs premieres.	
3	Media Watch returns to ABC TV for its thirty-sixth season, with new presenter Linton Besser.	
5	Liz Hayes announces she has left the Nine Network after 44 years.	
7	The 14th AACTA Awards air on Network 10, with Russell Crowe hosting the ceremony.	
9	The official 2025 OzTAM television ratings period begins.	
13	Network 10 announces that they are acquiring the Ten Northern NSW/Gold Coast stations (NRN) from WIN Television, which will effectively end the regional simulcast on the Gold Coast as there is already an O&O Network 10 station in the city (TVQ Brisbane). The deal will also see local updates continuing in Northern NSW/Gold Coast, with the deal being finalised on 1 May.	
14	Better Homes and Gardens returns to the Seven Network for its thirty-first season.	
20	Abbey Gelmi confirms that she has departed the Seven Network after two years.	
21	Fremantle confirms that Neighbours has been axed for the 3rd time after 40 years, after failing to secure a renewal deal by Amazon.	
27	Southern Cross Austereo announces they are selling their remaining regional television licenses to Australian Digital Holdings. This will mark SCA's exit from television broadcasting. The sale of the stations is yet to be finalised. It is also announced that the southern NSW, regional Victoria and regional Queensland 10 stations will be sold to Network 10 on 1 March 2025.	

=== March ===
Date	Event	Source
1	Colour television marks 50 years since it was first broadcast in Australia.	
7	Seb Costello confirms he has left Nine Entertainment after 13 years amid an incident review about when he followed Oak Capital's Mo Ahmed in a hotel bathroom.	
13	Matt Stanton is appointed as CEO of Nine Entertainment.	
18	Neighbours celebrates its 40th anniversary.	
19	Network 10 announces the celebrity contestants who will make up the cast for the third season of The Amazing Race Australia: Celebrity Edition and the ninth season overall. The cast includes Bronte Campbell, Stephen Curry, Bernard Curry, Brendan Fevola, Ed Kavalee, Tiffiny Hall, Gretel Killeen, Lindy Klim, Melissa Leong, Rob Mills, Ant Middleton, Aesha Scott and Georgie Tunny.	
25	WIN Television in Queensland is issued with a breach notice by the Australian Communications and Media Authority due to a faulty playout system which caused captioned phrases and sentences to be missing during the 24 November 2024 broadcast of A Remarkable Place to Die and the 2 December 2024 broadcast of Chicago Med.	

=== April ===
Date	Event	Source
2	DAZN's acquisition of Foxtel is completed, with it continuing to operating as an independent business and the company and its subsidiaries' identities remaining unchanged.	
7	The finale of the tenth season of Australian Idol airs on the Seven Network, which is won by Marshall Hamburger who beats out Iilysh Retallick and Gisella Colletti.	
9	SBS announces that Tony Armstrong and Courtney Act will commentate on their coverage of the Eurovision Song Contest for 2025.	
13	A two-week suspension in OzTAM television ratings begins for the Easter break.	
13	It is announced that the Seven Network have secured the rights to broadcast the 2026 Commonwealth Games in Glasgow and the 2030 Commonwealth Games live and free across Australia on broadcast TV, digital and 7plus Sport.	
14	Neighbours airs Harold Bishop's final scenes, after the character's actor Ian Smith finished filming in December 2024 due to Smith being diagnosed with an "aggressive" form of terminal cancer.	
14	Myles Kuah wins Australian Survivor: Brains V Brawn II.	
27	Official OzTAM ratings will resume after a two-week non-ratings period over Easter.	
28	The Floor will premiere on the Nine Network	
29	Anne Edmonds is announced as the new host of Network 10's revival of Talkin' 'Bout Your Gen.	
30	It is reported that Foxtel has laid off over 100 staff, mainly from its marketing and engineering division, just 4 weeks after being acquired by DAZN.	

=== May ===
Date	Event	Source
2	It is announced that Joel Dry will return to the Nine Network, succeeding Andrew Lofthouse as co-presenter for the Nine News Queensland bulletin alongside Melissa Downes beginning in August.	
6	After a deal with ADH fell through, Southern Cross Austereo announces they are selling their remaining regional television licenses to Seven West Media. The deal is to be completed by 30 June 2025, marking SCA's exit from TV broadcasting.	
15	After just 12 months, Anthony De Ceglie, the director of news and current affairs at Seven West Media, resigns from the broadcaster as he is appointed as the chief executive of the National Rugby League expansion club Perth Bears. The broadcaster also confirms that current Perth news director Ray Kuka will replace De Ceglie as company news director, commencing on 19 May.	
16	7 Tasmania Nightly News broadcasts their final bulletin from the TNT-9 studios in Watchorn Street Launceston, where the program had been produced for the past 63 years. News production relocated to new purpose-built studios in the Launceston CBD.	

=== June ===
Date	Event	Source
2	The Nine Network confirms the launch of a new US bureau in Washington, D.C., for later in June. Lauren Tomasi is appointed as the bureau's correspondent.	
2	BTQ Brisbane experiences a power failure at 6:37pm (AEST) during the local Seven News bulletin, which is resolved in time for the weather.	
8	While wrapping up an on-the-scene report during a protest in Los Angeles over immigration raids in the U.S. city, Nine News reporter Lauren Tomasi is hit at close range by a rubber bullet from an LAPD officer's gun. Nine News publishes the video online, and indicates that while Tomasi was "left sore" by the bullet, and she and her camera operator were "otherwise unharmed."	
15	WIN Television is reportedly unable to reach an agreement with the Seven Network to continue providing Seven channels in two regions: Mount Gambier/Riverland/Loxton of eastern South Australia as well as the Griffith and Murrumbidgee Irrigation Area of New South Wales. The next day, WIN Television confirms they will cease broadcasting Seven Network programming into those regions beginning 1 July 2025.	
16	The seven Gold Logie nominees for 2025 are announced as Hamish Blake, Sonia Kruger, Allison Langdon, Poh Ling Yeow, Lynne McGranger, Lisa Millar and Julia Morris.	
27	After 16 years, The Project airs its final episode on 10.	
30	10 launches 10 News+ airing 6pm Sunday to Monday, replacing The Project following its finale a week prior. The Australian version of Deal or No Deal moves to 7pm.	

=== July ===
Date	Event	Source
1	Seven West Media completes the sale of Southern Cross Austereo's remaining television assets, marking the company's exit from television.	
1	It is announced that the Nine Network is leading in the ratings for the first half of 2025.	
3	The Project's Georgie Tunny announces that she is joining 10 News+, following the cancellation of the former in late June 2025.	
3	WIN Television resumes broadcasting Seven Network programming across the Mount Gambier, Riverland and Griffith regions, as a result of a new broadcast deal. This comes after its previous deal expired on 1 July 2025.	
8	It is announced that Planet America is moving to Monday nights, following the cancellation of Q+A.	
9	The third and final State of Origin of 2025 is watched by 3.9 million, making it the highest rated program of the year to date.	
9	Tim Arvier announces he will be departing the Nine Network to take up a media role in the Queensland Government.	
11	Neighbours films its final episode for Amazon Prime Video.	
14	10 signs an agreement to continue airing Sky News Regional in regional Queensland, New South Wales and Victoria.	
19	Casey Briggs covers the 2025 Tasmanian state election, his first election as ABC chief election analyst. Briggs succeeds Antony Green who had been in the role since 1991.	
22	The ABC will switch off its satellite transmissions for viewers still using legacy Foxtel boxes. Viewers will have to upgrade to the newer Foxtel iQ4 or iQ5 in order to continue viewing the broadcaster's TV channels via satellite.	
27	It is confirmed the house of Big Brother will be returning to its original location at Dreamworld for its 16th season.	
31	After 10 years, Heather Ewart presents her last episode of Back Roads. Ewart was succeeded as host by journalist Lisa Millar.	

=== August ===
Date	Event	Source
1	The Australian Broadcasting Corporation pulls the Bluey episode Hammerbarn, as the corporation cannot align with a commercial partnership.	
3	The Logie Awards of 2025 is held, with Lynne McGranger winning the Gold Logie Award for Most Popular Personality on Australian Television.	
28	Gogglebox Australia returns for season 22, dedicating its premiere episode to former cast member Emmie Milligan, who died earlier in 2025.	

=== September ===
Date	Event	Source
3	SBS is the first network to hold their 2026 Upfronts. The event takes place in Sydney.	
8	10 News Melbourne launches a new chroma key virtual reality news set, with the news desk being the only physical part of the set.	
8	The sentencing of triple murderer Erin Patterson is the first sentencing in the state of Victoria to broadcast live on television.	
11	DAZN subsidiaries Foxtel, Binge and Kayo hold their 2026 Upfronts in Sydney.	
16	Talkin' 'Bout Your Generation returns to 10 for its seventh season with new host Anne Edmonds. The show last aired on 10 in 2012, before moving to Nine for two seasons between 2018 and 2019.	
18	7NEWS Sydney Friday and Saturday sports anchor Matt Carmicheal departs the network after 23 years. Charmichael's role was made redundant by the network.	
18	The ABC is barred from a joint press conference between UK Prime Minister Sir Keir Starmer and US President Donald Trump, just days after ABC reporter John Lyons clashed with the US president on the White House lawns. Lyons, reporting for Four Corners was attempting to question Trump on his business dealings while in office. Downing Street stated the ABC was barred due to logistical issues.	
21	10 announce the return of Millionaire Hot Seat in 2026, with Rebecca Gibney set to host the revival.	
22	Peter “Murph” Murphy delivers his final weather forecast for 7 Tasmania Nightly News. After presenting the weather for the past 41 years, Murphy is Australia's longest serving commercial weather presenter at the time of retirement.	
24	ABC is ordered to pay A$150,000 in penalties for unfairly sacking presenter Antoinette Lattouf over a social media post about the war in Gaza.	
25	Nine raises A$6.07million for children's cancer charity My Room during the final episode of The Sunday Footy Show.	
27	The 2025 AFL Gand Final overtakes the third State Of Origin match to become the most watched television program of the year to date, with 4.08million viewers watching on the Seven Network. A further 969,000 watched on streaming service 7plus.	
28	Gretel Killeen is announced as the host of the third season of The Traitors Australia, set to air in 2026 on 10.	
30	Following Seven West Media's acquisition of Southern Cross Austereo's television assets in July 2025, the two companies announce their intention to merge. Seven's chairman Kerry Stokes also announces his intention to retire in February 2026 following the merge.	

=== October ===
Date	Event	Source
5	Nine News Melbourne weekend news anchor Peter Hitchener delivers his 10,000th news broadcast.	
5	The NRL Grand Final beats the AFL Grand Final to become the most watched television program of 2025 to date, with 4.46million viewers.	
6	7 Tasmania Nightly News rebrands its on air identity to 7NEWS Tasmania, aligning itself with the network branding of 7NEWS.	
10	Former ABC News Breakfast host Michael Rowland appointed as National Affairs Reporter for 7.30.	
15	The Nine Network holds their 2026 Upfronts event in Sydney.	
19	The 2025 Channel Seven Perth Telethon raises $90 million for 161 Western Australian children's charities.	
22	The Seven Network holds their 2026 Upfronts event at the Royal Randwick in Sydney.	

=== November ===
Date	Event	Source
6	Paramount Australia & New Zealand (which owns Network 10) holds their 2026 Upfronts event from Dreamworld, in preparation for the return of Big Brother to 10.	
10	Nine News Adelaide anchor Kate Collins departs Nine after 19 years with the network. Collin's had presented the 6pm bulletin since 2011.	
20	ABC holds their 2026 Showcase event at their Ultimo Headquarters in Sydney.	
24	WIN News relaunches local bulletins for Mildura in Victoria and Griffith in NSW. Both bulletins are presented by Bruce Roberts from the networks Wollongong studios.	

=== December ===
Date	Event	Source
11	Neighbours airs its final episode on Network 10 after 40 years in production.	
12	After 22 years as Sunrise weekday sports anchor, Mark Baretta departs the program.	
12	After 2 years as WIN News weather presenter, Sarah Cawte departs the bulletin.	
14	Chris Bath presents her final 10 News Weekend bulletin after 7 years. Bath is succeeded as weekend anchor by Georgie Tunny.	
22	Seven West Media shareholders vote to merge with Southern Cross Media. The merger is expected to take place on 7 January 2026.	
29	After an extended period of personal leave, 7NEWS Regional Queensland presenter Rob Brough is confirmed to have departed the station. Brough presented regional Queensland bulletins for almost 20 years, prior to taking leave in 2024.	

== Premieres ==
=== Domestic series ===
List of domestic television series premieres
Program	Original airdate	Network	Source
Island Echoes with Nornie Bero	8 January (NITV); 13 January (SBS Food)	NITV; SBS Food	
Danica De Giorgio	17 January	Sky News Australia	
Optics	29 January	ABC TV	
Apple Cider Vinegar	6 February	Netflix	
Invisible Boys	13 February	Stan	
Good Cop/Bad Cop	20 February	Stan	
Memory Bites with Matt Moran	10 March	SBS Food	
Freddy and The Eighth	12 March	Nine Network	
Sam Pang Tonight	17 March	Network 10	
The Last Anniversary	27 March	Binge	
The Narrow Road to the Deep North	18 April	Amazon Prime Video	
Claire Hooper's House of Games	21 April	ABC TV	
Marion Grasby's Flavours of Heart & Home	28 April	SBS Food	
The Floor	28 April	Nine Network	
The List	1 May	Network 10; Paramount+	
The Piano	4 May	ABC TV	
House Hunters Australia	11 May	Network 10	
Billion Dollar Playground	13 May	Binge	
The Survivors	6 June	Netflix	
Mix Tape	12 June	Binge; Showcase	
Stranded on Honeymoon Island	23 June	Seven Network	
10 News+	30 June	Network 10	
Do Not Watch This Show	4 July	ABC iview	
The Family Next Door	10 August	ABC TV	
Playing Gracie Darling	14 August	Paramount+	
Top End Bub	12 September	Amazon Prime Video	
Off The Grid	24 September	Seven Network	
Jim Jefferies and Friends	2 October	Seven Network	
Watching You	3 October	Stan	
The Golden Bachelor	20 October	Nine Network	
Ghosts Australia	2 November	Network 10; Paramount+	
Crime Night!	5 November	ABC TV	
Sunny Nights	26 December	Stan	
Château DIY Australia	TBA	Nine Network	
Once In A Lifetime	TBA	Seven Network	

=== International series ===
List of international television series premieres
Program	Original airdate	Country of origin	Network(s)	Source
Showtrial	1 January	United Kingdom	SBS On Demand	
Lockerbie: A Search for Truth	2 January	United Kingdom	Binge; Showcase	
The Darkness	9 January	Iceland	SBS	
The Pitt	10 January	United States	Binge	
Protection	10 January	United Kingdom	Stan	
Until I Kill You	12 January	United Kingdom	ABC TV	
Playing Nice	29 January	United Kingdom	SBS	
St. Denis Medical	3 February	United States	7plus	
The Hunting Party	4 February	United States	7plus	
Madam	4 February	New Zealand	Nine Network; 9Now	
Ludwig	5 February	United Kingdom	7plus	
Breathtaking	12 February	United Kingdom	7plus	
Suits LA	24 February	United States	7plus	
Smoggie Queens	3 March	United Kingdom	Binge	
Long Bright River	13 March	United States	Stan	
Happy Face	21 March	United States	Paramount+	
MobLand	30 March	United States	Paramount+	
The Listeners	1 April	United Kingdom	Binge; Showcase	
Pulse	3 April	United States	Netflix	
Doc	22 April	United States	7plus	

=== Documentaries ===
==== Domestic ====
List of domestic documentary series/docofilm premieres
Program	Original airdate	Network(s)	Source
Dr Karl's How Things Work	7 January	ABC TV	
Eat The Invaders	7 January	ABC TV	
Miriam Margolyes in New Zealand	12 January	ABC TV	
One Mind One Heart	19 January	SBS; NITV	
Hear Me Out	20 January	ABC TV	
The Tattooist's Son: Journey to Auschwitz	28 January	Stan	
Unbreakable: The Jelena Dokic Story	29 January	Nine Network	
The Role of a Lifetime	18 February	ABC TV	
Australia: An Unofficial History	5 March	SBS	
Full Sweat	5 March	Seven Network	
Skin in the Game	23 March	SBS; NITV	
West Coast Cops	28 March	Nine Network	
Swingers: How To Win An Election	8 April	ABC TV	
The Secret DNA of Us	17 April	SBS	
Gen Well	5 May	LifeStyle	
The Kimberley	13 May	ABC TV	
Airport 24/7	5 June	Network 10	
Australia's Most Identical	24 June	Nine Network	
Dr Ann's Secret Lives	15 July	ABC TV	
Great Australian Road Trips	31 July	SBS	
The People vs Robodebt	24 September	SBS	
The Idea of Australia	15 October	SBS	
End Game	21 October	ABC TV	
Todd Sampson's Why	TBA	Network 10	

==== International ====
List of international documentary series/docofilm premieres
Program	Original airdate	Country of origin	Network(s)	Source
Monty Don's Spanish Gardens	3 January	United Kingdom	ABC TV	
Sons of Ecstasy	9 January	United States	Binge	
Escaping Utopia	13 January	New Zealand	ABC TV	
Becoming Madonna	30 January	United Kingdom	Nine Network	
Madrid with Michael Portillo	3 February	United Kingdom	SBS	
Wilderness with Simon Reeve	3 February	United Kingdom	SBS	
The Americas	25 March	United States	Seven Network	
Airborne: Nature In Our Skies	2 April	United Kingdom	Network 10	

=== Specials ===
List of international television special premieres
Program	Original airdate	Country of origin	Network(s)	Source
Billy Joel: The 100th Live at Madison Square Garden	2 February	United States	Seven Network	
67th Annual Grammy Awards	3 February	United States	Stan	

== Channels and streaming services ==
=== New channels/streaming services ===
Date	Channel/service
19 February	British Cinema
25 March	Aussie Classics
31 March	HBO Max

=== Rebranding channels/streaming services ===
Date	Old name	New name
30 June	10 Bold Drama	10 Drama
30 June	10 Peach Comedy	10 Comedy
30 June	10Play	10

=== Closed channels ===
Date	Name	Provider
31 March	Comedy Central	Fetch TV
13 May	Cartoon Network	Foxtel
13 May	Boomerang	Foxtel
30 June	MTV Hits	Foxtel
30 June	MTV 80s	Foxtel
30 June	Club MTV	Foxtel
30 June	NickMusic	Foxtel
30 June	CMT	Foxtel
30 June	Stingray Music	Foxtel
26 August	Famous	Foxtel
1 November	MTV Hits	Fetch TV
1 November	MTV 80s	Fetch TV
1 November	Club MTV	Fetch TV
1 November	NickMusic	Fetch TV
1 November	Nick Jr.	Fetch TV
1 November	Nickelodeon	Fetch TV
1 November	MTV	Fetch TV
1 November	MTV 90s	Fetch TV
1 November	MTV 00s	Fetch TV

== Programming changes ==
=== Changes to network affiliation ===
Criterion for inclusion in the following list is that Australian premiere episodes will air in Australia for the first time on a new channel. This includes when a program is moved from a free-to-air network's primary channel to a digital multi-channel, as well as when a program moves between subscription television channels – provided the preceding criterion is met. Ended television series which change networks for repeat broadcasts are not included in the list.

List of domestic television series which changed network affiliation
Program	Date	New network	Previous network	Source

List of international television programs which changed network affiliation
Program	Date	New network	Previous network	Country of origin	Source
General Hospital	1 January	10Play	W	United States	
All HBO content	31 March	Max	Binge	United States	
Friends	31 March	Max	Binge	United States	
The Big Bang Theory	31 March	Max	Binge	United States	

=== Free-to-air premieres ===
This is a list of documentaries and programs which made their premiere on Australian free-to-air television that had previously premiered on Australian subscription television or on streaming service providers in Australia. Programs may still air on the original subscription television network or streaming service.

List of international television programs which premiered on free-to-air television for the first time
Program	Date	Free-to-air network	Subscription network(s)	Country of origin	Source
Beyond Paradise	4 January	ABC TV	BBC First	United Kingdom	
The Ex-Wife	21 January	Network 10	Paramount+	United Kingdom	
Elsbeth	22 January	Network 10	Paramount+	United States	
Love It or List It Australia	8 February	Network 10	Lifestyle	Australia	
Boiling Point	27 February	SBS	BBC First	United Kingdom	
Abbott Elementary	5 March	ABC Family	Disney+	United States	
Boat Story	16 March	ABC TV	BBC First	United Kingdom	
Scrublands	18 March	Nine Network	Stan	Australia	
Paris & Nicole: The Encore	22 April	7Bravo	Hayu	United States	
Fake	25 May	Network 10	Paramount+	Australia	
Watson	20 July	Network 10	Paramount+	United States	
The Office	11 September	Network 10	Amazon Prime Video	Australia	

=== Subscription premieres ===
This is a list of programs which made their debut on Australian subscription television, having previously premiered on Australian free-to-air television. Programs may still air (first or repeat) on the original free-to-air television network.

List of domestic television programs which premiered on subscription television for the first time
Program	Date	Free-to-air network	Subscription network(s)	Country of origin	Source

=== Returning programs ===
Australian produced programs which are returning with a new season after being absent from television from the previous calendar year.

Program	Return date	Previous run(s)	Type of return	Previous channel	New/same channel	Source
A Girl's Guide to Hunting, Fishing and Wild Cooking	23 June 2025	2021	Return	SBS Food	same	
The Back Side of Television	30 June 2025	2021, 2023	Return	Fox8; Binge	same	
Talkin' 'Bout Your Generation	16 September	2009–2012; 2018–2019	Reboot	Nine Network	Network 10	
Healthy, Wealthy and Wise	27 September 2025	1992–1998	Reboot	Network 10	Seven Network	
Big Brother	9 November 2025	2001–2008; 2012-2014; 2020-2023	Revival	Seven Network	Network 10	
First Dates	TBA	2016–2020; 2022	Revival	Network 10	Seven Network	

=== Endings ===
List of domestic television series endings
Program	End date	Network(s)	Start date	Source
Nine News Darwin	21 January 2025	Nine Darwin	18 October 1982	
Apple Cider Vinegar	6 February 2025	Netflix	6 February 2025	
The Narrow Road to the Deep North	18 April 2025	Amazon Prime Video	18 April 2025	
Q+A	19 May 2025	ABC TV	22 May 2008	
The Back Page	24 June 2025	Fox League	1997	
The Project	27 June 2025	Network 10	20 July 2009	
Neighbours	December 2025	Network 10; Amazon Prime Video	18 March 1985	

== Deaths ==
Name	Date of death	Age	Broadcasting notability	Source
Ron Challinor	3 January	80	Actor, choreographer and writer. Appeared on The Henderson Kids as Rutt Jones, featured in Cop Shop and other television shows.	
Mike Rinder	5 January	69	Australian-born former senior executive of Church of Scientology International. Co-hosted documentary series Leah Remini: Scientology and the Aftermath, alongside former Scientologist Leah Remini.	
Ken Randall	6 January	88	Veteran political correspondent and National Press Club president.	
Simon Townsend	14 January	79	Journalist and television presenter, best known as the host of Simon Townsend's Wonder World.	
Leila Hayes	19 January	85	Actress best known for her role as Beryl Palmer in soap opera Sons and Daughters	
Nicholas Eadie	22 January	67	Actor, known for his role as Constable Sam Phillips on Cop Shop and other shows and programs such as A Country Practice and Vietnam.	
Philip Brady	11 February	85	Pioneering television personality, appeared on numerous early programs alongside contemporaries Bert Newton and Graham Kennedy	
Tony Healey	12 February	in his 70s	Kommotion regular and journalist	
Paul Karo	4 April	89	Scottish-born Australian actor (Quiet Night, The Box, Prisoner)	
Richard Zachariah	9 April	80	Host of The Home Show on ABC television	
Gerard Kennedy	21 April	93	Actor (Division 4, The Flying Doctors, Homicide)	
Iain Finlay	6 May	89	ABC journalist	
Donald MacDonald	29 June	86	Actor and presenter best known for Come in Spinner, The Box, Play School and I Married a Bachelor	
Julian McMahon	2 July	56	Australian actor best known for Home and Away, later found success in Hollywood in film and TV including Charmed. Nip/Tuck and FBI: Most Wanted.	
Peter Russell-Clarke	4 July	89	Chef, best known for his cooking program Come and Get It	
Emmie Silbery	8 July	96	Regular cast member of Gogglebox Australia from 2016 to 2023.	
Penny Spence		83	Pioneering journalist, one of the first females to read news in Australia, had a long association with the Nine Network also had a current affairs program, was a weather presenter and children's television producer, married Geoff Harvey.	
Peter Ryan	18 July	64	Award-winning journalist, who retired in June 2025 as the ABC's senior business correspondent. Also worked as the corporation's Victorian news director and the Washington correspondent.	
Henri Szeps	24 July	81	Actor of stage and screen, best known for playing Robert the Dentist in ABC sitcom and the original version of Mother and Son.	
Col Joye	5 August	89	Pioneering Australian rock musician, was a regular to TV audiences through his appearances on Bandstand.	
Judy Bailey	8 August	89	Pioneering jazz musician, served as pianist on children's show Play School, served in the orchestra of Tommy Tycho at the Seven Network.	
David Stratton	14 August	85	Film critic, historian and co-host of with Margaret Pomeranz of The Movie Show and At the Movies	
Tristan Rogers	16 August	79	Australian-born actor who appeared in local productions,Barrier Reef, Number 96, The Box, Bellbird, and Power Without Glory, later relocated to the United States where he continued his career starring in series General Hospital and The Young and the Restless.	
Michael Charlton	24 August	98	Pioneering award-winning journalist who was the inaugural presenter of current affairs program Four Corners, was a cricket commentator and also worked in England.	
Roger Climpson	17 September	93	Broadcast journalist, known for Seven News, hosted local versions of This is your Life and Australia Most Wanted.	
Alison Drower	28 September	60-61	Media personality, known for her music reports on MTV Music Television presenter by Richard Wilkins and Joy Smithers. Was reporter for Ten Network Motorsports, including the Supercars Championship and TV program RPM. Served as News Director at Southern Cross Austereo.	
Graham Richardson	8 November	76	Australian Labor Party politician, Senator for New South Wales and cabinet minister turned political commentator and media personality. Appeared on the Nine and Seven before joining Sky News Australia in 2011 hosting Richo and Richo + Jones from 2014 to 2021.	
John Laws	9 November	90	Radio broadcaster, who appeared on television as a host, as "the Beast" on the poular panel show Beauty and the Beast, also was a singer who featured on such musical variety shows as Bandstand with Brian Henderson. Laws also played a real estate agent on an episode of Skippy the Bush Kangaroo	
Toni Lamond	29 November	aged 93	Musical theatre performer, and half sister of singer Helen Reddy broke new ground for woman in showbiz, being the first women in the world to host a Tonight Show, she guest starred in numerous TV shows including Division 4 and Number 96 and made numerous appearances on variety and talk show's including In Melbourne Tonight, The Mike Walsh Show Good Morning Australia, The Bert Newton Show, Denise and Spicks and Specks. Also featured in US television programs including The Love Boat, Punky Brewster, Murder She Wrote and Starsky and Hutch	
Rachael Carpani	7 December	aged 45	actress known for playing Jodi Fountain on McLeod's Daughters. Guest star roles included All Saints, Home and Away and 800 Words And appeared in American TV programmes, including NCIS LA	
Candy Raymond	December	aged 75	Actress best known or her 70's and 80's soap opera roles in Number 96 and cult drama Prisoner, guests roles included Skippy the Bush Kangaroo and soap opera's Cop Shop and The Sullivans.	
