= News ratings in Australia =

- 2008; 2009

Television news ratings in Australia are collected by three main organisations: OzTAM in metropolitan areas, Regional TAM in regional areas serviced by three commercial television networks, and in areas with two commercial networks, Nielsen Media Research Australia. Ratings are collected for 40 weeks during the year, excluding a two-week break during Easter and ten weeks over summer. The majority of locally produced news and public affairs top the rating charts week after week.

== History ==
Throughout the early to mid 1980s, Ten Eyewitness News, Network Ten's newscast was the leader in news in the markets of Sydney, Melbourne, Brisbane and Adelaide, mainly because it was the only news service in Australia at the time that was broadcast at 6.00pm, as all the other network's aired their newscast at 6.30pm or 7.00pm, and also because their news service went for one whole hour (a format which remains in use as of today). In descending order, National Nine News, Seven National News, ABC News and World News Tonight, all lagged behind Ten.

Falling viewers numbers in the mid-1980s, particularly across the eastern seaboard, led the Seven Network to relaunch both its programming and its news service, which was renamed Seven Nightly News, as part of the network's growing alignment (in terms of branding) with the US network NBC – taking on both the name and well-known theme music (The Mission, composed by John Williams) of NBC's flagship news program, NBC Nightly News. During the worst period of low ratings, Seven Nightly News was forced to move their news to 6.30 pm because National Nine News was too strong in the ratings. Shortly after the 1991 creation of the Seven Network as a company, a national populist current affairs program Real Life was launched, presented by former ABC reporter Stan Grant. It replaced Derryn Hinch's current affair program called Hinch which aired between 1987 and 1991 until moved to Network Ten for another 2 years. Real Life continued until 1995, when it was replaced by state-based editions of the current program Today Tonight.

In 1987, National Nine News began over-taking Ten Eyewitness News in the ratings. By 1988, they had taken the lead and was enjoying ratings success nationally. The Nine Network, re-launched A Current Affair in early 1988 with former Ten Eyewitness News anchor Jana Wendt. ACA enjoyed ratings success under Wendt topping the 1991 Australian TV Ratings. Jana left in late 1991 and was replaced by Ray Martin. In 1992 Nine started the longtime slogan "Who's Who of News", using it right up until 2004. They continued to dominate until 2005.

Seven, meanwhile, started to turn their fortunes around in 2003. They picked up Nine's long-time chief of news and current affairs Peter Meakin and former Nine anchor and Today newsreader Ian Ross to anchor the Sydney bulletin. By 2007, Seven News became the top news service around the nation and in every capital city in Australia; in Brisbane, the recruitment of another former Today newsreader Sharyn Ghidella, who replaced Tracey Challenor on the weekend news, and former Nine News Queensland weather presenter John Schluter saw them overtake the market-leading Nine bulletin for the first time in two decades. Beforehand, Seven News only dominated in Perth, in fact Seven News Perth has been the top rating bulletin in that market since the early 1990s.

Since 2011, however, Seven started to slowly lose its nationwide dominance, partly attributed to the retirement of Ian Ross as anchor of the Sydney bulletin at the end of 2009, and declining ratings for the lead-in game show Deal or No Deal. Nine reclaimed its dominance in the Sydney market in 2011, followed by Melbourne in 2012, and then Brisbane (narrowly, by 21 weeks to Seven's 19) and nationally in 2013. Their dominance continued into 2015, when they also started to claim regular weeknight victories in Adelaide, where Seven had dominated for a long period. Seven, however, hit back in 2016, thanks to a new lead-in game show titled The Chase Australia, which helped to lift its news audience numbers on the east coast, where Nine continues to remain dominant.

== Organisations ==
There are three main organisations: OzTAM in metropolitan areas, Regional TAM in regional areas serviced by three commercial television networks, and in areas with two commercial networks, Nielsen Media Research Australia, that measure television news ratings in Australia.

=== OzTAM ===
OzTAM is an Australian television ratings research firm that collects and markets news rating data. It is jointly owned by the Seven Network, the Nine Network and Network Ten, and is the official source of television news ratings data for all metropolitan television in Sydney, Melbourne, Adelaide, Brisbane and Perth as well as subscription services (such as Sky News Australia) on a national basis.

=== Regional TAM ===
Regional TAM is a research firm that provides the television news ratings for regional television markets with three commercial television operators.

=== Nielsen Media Research Australia ===
Nielsen Media Research Australia is an American-based firm that measures the audiences for areas that remain un-aggregated, and of which are today known as diary markets. Nielsen Media Research began as a division of ACNielsen, a marketing research firm. In 1996, Nielsen Media Research was split off into an independent company, and in 1999 was purchased by the Dutch conglomerate VNU. In 2001, VNU also purchased ACNielsen, thereby bringing both companies under the same corporate umbrella.

== See also ==
- Television in Australia
- Television Ratings
- OzTAM
- Nielsen Media Research Australia
