= Extra (Australian TV program) =

- Final Extra and Weekend Extra Logo before axing
- Also known as: Brisbane Extra
- Genre: Public Affairs
- Presented by: Rick Burnett; Jillian Whiting; Heather Foord
- Country of origin: Australia
- Original language: English
- No. of seasons: 18
- No. of episodes: 4540 (approx)

Production
- Production locations: QTQ, Brisbane, Australia
- Running time: 23 minutes

Original release
- Network: Nine Network
- Release: 9 February 1991 – 26 June 2009

Related
- A Current Affair, the television channel of the same name

Extra (originally Brisbane Extra) was a nightly tabloid local current affairs program, broadcast on Nine Network Queensland. Heather Foord was the last host of the program. A weekend version also aired on a Saturday afternoon named Weekend Extra hosted by Melissa Downes.

== Hosts ==
- Rick Burnett (1992–2006)
- Jillian Whiting (2006–2008)
- Heather Foord (2009)

In 2007, presenter Jillian Whiting went on maternity leave, and during this period various television, radio and media celebrities from Queensland and Australia hosted the program for week-long periods each. In the final weeks of Whiting's leave, presenters Melissa Downes and Miranda Deakin filled-in for the remaining weeks of the program, including the Summer non-ratings season. The Nine Network officially announced that Jillian Whiting would return to Extra and her role as presenter of Gold Coast's National Nine News, from the first episode broadcast in 2008, however this was delayed by two weeks.

== Reporters ==
- Doug Murray
- Margueritte Rossi
- Nicole Madigan
- Rory O'Connor
- Jasmin Geisel (now Forsyth)
- Belinda Burrows
- Lisa Honeywill
- Natalie Gruzlewski
- Sylvia Jeffreys
- Dana Sanders
- Ben McCormack
- Shane Doherty

== History ==
On 10 February 1992, Brisbane Extra launched alongside other sister productions in capital cities around the country. A Current Affair reporter, Rick Burnett, made his debut as host, with ex-ABC personality Doug Murray and a team of young reporters. One year later, the sister programs were axed, but the Brisbane program proved so popular with its local audience, it continued, changing its name to simply Extra.

In 2000, Extra celebrated its 2000th episode with a free family fun day at South Bank including a special performance by Hi-5. And celebrated its 3000th episode in 2004 by giving viewers 3000 presents every day for a week.

In 2006, Rick Burnett was sacked by the network and replaced by newsreader and journalist Jillian Whiting. The program was briefly aired in regional Queensland via WIN Television in 2007, but was dropped six months later. Jillian continued to host Extra until 2008, when she moved to the Seven Network. Heather Foord became host in 2009 after she was stood down as newsreader on Nine News.

== Cancellation ==
Despite airing for eighteen years, maintaining its popularity and high ratings, the local current affairs program was axed by the Nine Network on 17 June 2009, due to a major schedule clean up for a new one-hour current affairs program, This Afternoon, which was hosted by Andrew Daddo, Katrina Blowers and Mark Ferguson from 4:30 p.m. weekdays and which premiered the Monday following the program's final broadcast. The decision was a part of a push to nationalise lead-in content for the network's struggling news bulletins. The game show Millionaire Hot Seat was moved to replace Extra at 5.30 p.m.

The fate of the show's presenter Heather Foord was initially unclear, however, it was later announced by the network that she would rejoin Nine News as weekend news presenter.

The final broadcast on 26 June ended with a message from Heather Foord thanking viewers for their support, with audiences having sent emails, phone calls and faxes in protest over the decision to cancel Extra. The broadcast closed with a montage of memories over the program's 18-year-run.

Extra's local website was removed one week following the final episode.

The Extra brand was later used on a television channel, launched 3 years after the program's discontinuation, on 26 March 2012 on LCN 94 (now on LCN 97).

== See also ==
- List of Australian television series
- List of Nine Network programs
- List of longest-running Australian television series
