= BTQ =

Television station in Brisbane, Australia

- Brisbane, Queensland; Australia
- Channels: Digital: 6 (VHF); Virtual: 7
- Branding: Seven

Programming
- Language: English
- Network: Seven

Ownership
- Owner: Seven Media Group; (Channel Seven Brisbane Pty Ltd)

History
- First air date: 1 November 1959
- Former channel numbers: Analog: 7 (VHF) (1959–2013), Analog: 2 (some analog TVs) (VHF) (1959-2013)
- Call sign meaning: Brisbane Television Queensland

Technical information
- Licensing authority: Australian Communications and Media Authority
- ERP: 50 kW
- HAAT: 335 m
- Transmitter coordinates: 27°27′59″S 152°56′36″E

Links
- Public licence information: Profile
- Website: 7plus.com.au

BTQ is the Brisbane television station of the Seven Network in Australia. BTQ was the second television station to launch in Brisbane, going to air on 1 November 1959, after QTQ (station of the Nine Network) launched three months earlier and before ABQ (station of the Australian Broadcasting Corporation) launched just 1 day after BTQ's launch. Studios and offices are located at 560 Sir Samuel Griffith Drive in Mount Coot-Tha.

Along with other Australian television channels, BTQ began broadcasting on digital television on 1 January 2001.

In the early eighties, Seven National News became the first Brisbane-based bulletin to be relayed throughout a string of independent Queensland telecasters. Within the same decade, BTQ was also a major production house for children's television – hosting popular shows as Wombat, Now You See It, Family Feud, Play Your Cards Right and Seven's Super Saturday featuring Agro (puppet). In the 1980s and 1990s, the channel regularly opened its facilities to the Brisbane public – at Open Days. In the 1970s, BTQ also held annual telethons for the Children's Hospital, featuring network personalities.

In 1995, BTQ also produced "Tourist TV", a tourist information channel which could be viewed at various Gold Coast hotels and resorts, including Sea World Nara Resort.

Until 2007, BTQ was the key station of the national Austext teletext service. The service was later largely automated out of ATN-7 Sydney until it was decommissioned in September 2009.

In July 2018, deconstruction of the BTQ transmission tower began after nearly 60 years of service. On 21 July 2018 the top half of tower which contained its broadcasting elements, no longer in use by the station, was removed in stages by a destruction crew via helicopter.

== News ==
=== Brisbane and Queensland ===
Seven News Brisbane is directed by Michael Coombes and presented by Max Futcher and Sarah Greenhalgh on weeknights and Samantha Heathwood on weekends from Seven's Brisbane studios, located at Mount Coot-tha. Sport is presented by Steve Titmus from Sunday to Wednesday and Ben Davis from Thursday to Saturday. Weather is presented by certified meteorologist Tony Auden from Sunday to Thursday and Coastal Expert Paul Burt on Friday and Saturday.

The bulletin is also simulcast in Brisbane on local radio station 96.5 Family FM, to regional Queensland viewers in the Sunshine Coast, Wide Bay-Burnett, Toowoomba, Rockhampton, Mackay, Townsville and Cairns television markets via the Seven Queensland network and across central & remote areas of eastern Australia, on Southern Cross Central.

Previously, Tracey Challenor presented the weekend news for many years until her resignation in February 2007. Cummins was first appointed to the weekday weather in 2005 after more than a year of the Brisbane bulletin not having a weather presenter; former kids show presenter Tony Johnston had this role in 2003. Cummins was replaced by former Nine weatherman John Schluter in early 2007 and she was moved to weekends. Ghidella joined Seven News in 2007 and replaced Challenor.

In October 2002, Rod Young moved from ABC News in Brisbane to co-anchor with Kay McGrath. She had presented Seven News Brisbane solo for the previous nine months following the retirement of Frank Warrick. Their dual presenter format has proved to be successful. Following a couple of lean years coming second to Nine News Brisbane, Seven News Brisbane regained its ratings lead by 2007, helped by the recruitment of ex-Nine weatherman John Schluter and director of news Rob Raschke. In 2008, Seven News Brisbane was officially the #1 bulletin in Brisbane, winning all 40 ratings weeks.

In January 2013, Sharyn Ghidella and Bill McDonald were appointed Sunday to Thursday presenters with Kay McGrath and Rod Young moving to present on Friday & Saturday. It was also announced that Ghidella will present a local edition of Today Tonight.

In March 2018, McDonald was removed as co-anchor of the bulletin, and was replaced by Max Futcher following poor ratings.

In January 2024, it was announced that Samantha Heathwood will replace Katrina Blowers as weekend news presenter from 3 February. Blowers will share presenting Seven Afternoon News with Heathwood and will be a reporter.

In July 2024, Sharyn Ghidella was made redundant after 17 years with the network. Following a raft of changes to the Brisbane newsroom, in August 2024, after 18 years, Shane Webcke stepped down from his sports presenter role to explore new directions and focus on family interests

In October 2024, it was announced Sarah Greenhalgh would join Max Futcher as co-anchor of 7NEWS Brisbane’s flagship 6.00pm weekday bulletin, starting from Monday, 21 October

News updates for Brisbane are presented by Max Futcher or Sarah Greenhalgh throughout the afternoon and the early evening. Katrina Blowers is a fill-in news presenter for the bulletin. Ben Davis and Alissa Smith are fill-in sports presenters and Laura Dymock is the fill-in weather presenter.

=== Presenters ===
Current presenters
Role	Bulletins						
Role	Monday	Tuesday	Wednesday	Thursday	Friday	Saturday	Sunday
News	Max Futcher (2018–present); Sarah Greenhalgh (2024–present)					Samantha Heathwood (2024–present)	
Sport	Steve Titmus (2024–present)			Alissa Smith (2024–present)			Steve Titmus (2024–present)
Weather	Tony Auden (2013–present)				Michelle Jensen (2024–present)		Tony Auden (2013–present)

=== Reporters ===
- Garth Burley (crime)
- Katrina Blowers
- Laura Dymock
- Anna McGraw
- Amanda Abate
- Brittany Lane
- Rosanna Kingsun (court)
- Mitchell Kroehn
- Deon Savage
- Carly Madsen
- Alex Lewis
- Tamra Bow
- Ben Davis (sport)
- Shane Webcke
- Trevor Gillmeister

=== Sunrise correspondents ===
- Georgia Chumbley (primary)
- Tamra Bow (secondary)

=== Past presenters ===
- Frank Warrick – news (1976–2001)
- Darren McDonald – news (1980s)
- Tracey Challenor – news (1991–2007)
- Simon Reeve – news (2001–2003)
- Bill McDonald – sport
- Talitha Cummins – weather (2005–2010)

== Current local programming ==
- Creek to Coast
- Queensland Weekender
- The Great Day Out
- Seven Afternoon News Queensland Edition (since August 2015)
- Sunrise Queensland bulletins (since October 2021)

== Former local programming ==
- Today Tonight (1995–2003, 2013–2014)
- Family Feud
- Wipeout
- Wombat
- Agro's Cartoon Connection – Moved to ATN-7 in 1997.
- Saturday Disney – Moved to ATN-7 in 1997.
- A*mazing – Moved to TVW-7 in 1997.
- Time Masters – Moved to TVW-7 in 1997.
- The Mole (Australian season 3) – Episodes 2–10, except for a portion of Episode 4
- The Mole (Australian season 6) – Gold Coast swing (up to and including Ally's termination).

== See also ==
- Television broadcasting in Australia *Sunrise (Australian TV program)
