= QTQ =

- Brisbane, Queensland; Australia
- City: Brisbane
- Channels: Digital: 8 (VHF); Virtual: 9
- Branding: Nine

Programming
- Language: English
- Network: Nine

Ownership
- Owner: Nine Entertainment; (Queensland Television Ltd)

History
- First air date: 16 August 1959
- Former channel number: Analog: 9 (VHF) (1959–2013)
- Call sign meaning: Queensland Television Queensland

Technical information
- ERP: 50 kW (digital)
- Transmitter coordinates: 27°28′17″S 152°56′31″E

Links
- Website: 9now.com.au

QTQ is an Australian television station, licensed to, and serving Brisbane, Queensland. It is owned by the Nine Entertainment, and is part of the Nine Network. It broadcasts on VHF Channel 8 (digital). QTQ began broadcasting on 16 August 1959 as the first television station in Queensland.

== News ==
QTQ-9's nightly news program is 9News Queensland, presented on weeknights by Melissa Downes and Joel Dry, with Bronte Gildea presenting sport, and Garry Youngberry presenting the weather. Mia Glover is the weekend presenter, with Dominique Loudon presenting sport and Luke Bradnam presenting weather. Luke Bradnam also presents Beach and Fishing reports each Friday and Saturday evening.

Fill-in presenters for the bulletins include news presenters Aislin Kriukelis, Alison Ariotti, Paul Taylor and Wendy Kingston.

The bulletin is simulcast in Brisbane on commercial radio station River 94.9, across regional Queensland on WIN Television and throughout remote eastern and central Australia on Imparja Television. As of September 2017, weekend bulletins also air in Darwin.

Since 2014, QTQ-9 has produced local editions of Nine Afternoon News Queensland (as well as the Morning News until it was axed in October 2017) on weekdays. The bulletin is presented by Aislin Kriukelis (Monday – Tuesday) and Alison Ariotti (Wednesday – Friday) with sport presenters Bronte Gildea (weekdays) and weather presenters Garry Youngberry (Monday – Thursday) and Luke Bradnam (Friday).

=== Presenter history ===
Wally Lewis was the weekday sports presenter until December 2006, when following an on-air incident, it was publicly revealed he had epilepsy. He returned to presenting weeknight sport during the 2007–2008 summer period, and also files sports reports. Chris Bombolas was the weekend sports presenter who preceded Steve Haddan, before resigning to become a politician. John Schluter was the weather presenter until his resignation in September 2006, to join rival Seven News Brisbane as the weekday weather presenter; his departure indirectly resulted in Nine News Queensland losing its long-time ratings lead to Seven News Brisbane in 2007; it was not until 2013 that they would regain the ratings lead.

Mike London formerly presented alongside Heather Foord until he resigned in June 2003, following allegations that he had arrangements for a female fan to complain about weeknight presenter Bruce Paige, who was co-presenting with Jillian Whiting at the time. London had swapped roles with Paige in the mid 1990s following the latter's return to the Nine Network.

=== 2011 "Choppergate" incident ===
On the bulletins of Nine News Queensland aired on 20 and 21 August 2011, newsreader Eva Milic conducted two crosses, one on each night, to reporters Melissa Mallet and Cameron Price, respectively, in the station's helicopter which claimed to be "near Beerwah", where the remains of murdered schoolboy Daniel Morcombe had been found earlier that month. The crosses were revealed to be fake when, on the second night, rival station Channel Seven filmed footage of the Nine helicopter sitting on the helipad outside their studios at Mount Coot-tha at the time of the broadcast. Radar footage also revealed that, on the first night, the helicopter was actually hovering over Chapel Hill, 70 km away from Beerwah. Both Mallet and Price, as well as news producer Aaron Wakeley, were sacked by the Nine Network following the incident, while news director Lee Anderson resigned in protest over the faked crossings. Despite the scandal, Nine experienced a spike in its 6:00 pm news ratings in the weeks that followed, managed to win more weeks than it did in the previous three years combined (winning seven of the 32 ratings weeks up to the first week of October), and recovered to reclaim its mantle as Queensland's most-watched news service by 2013.

== See also ==
- Television broadcasting in Australia
