= List of Australian television news ratings for 2008 =

News ratings in Australia
- 2008; 2009

== News shares ==
Market	News shares
Market	ABC News	Seven News	National Nine News	Ten News	SBS World News
5 Cities	1,064,000	1,501,000	1,187,000	801,000	200,000

== Highest-rated news and public affairs shows ==
=== Metropolitan ===
- Data based on the five metropolitan markets only.

Rank	Program	Network	Timeslot	Audience
1	Seven News-Sunday	7	Sunday, 6.00 – 6:30 pm	1,578,000
2	60 Minutes	9	Sunday, 7.30 – 8:30 pm	1,504,000
3	Seven News-Weeknights	7	Monday-Friday, 6.00 – 6:30 pm	1,501,000
4	National Nine News-Sunday *	9	Sunday, 6.00 – 6:30 pm	1,414,000
5	Today Tonight	7	Monday-Friday, 6.30 – 7:00pm	1,374,000
6	Seven News-Saturday	7	Saturday, 6.00 – 6:30pm	1,329,000
7	National Nine News-Weeknights	9	Monday-Friday, 6.00 – 6:30pm	1,187,000
8	A Current Affair	9	Monday-Friday, 6.30 – 7:00pm	1,124,000
9	ABC News-Weeknights	ABC1	Monday-Friday, 7.00 – 7:30pm	1,113,000
10	National Nine News-Saturday	9	Saturday, 6.00 – 6:30pm	1,064,000
11	ABC News-Sunday	ABC1	Tuesday, 7.30 – 9:30pm	1,058,000
12	ABC News-Saturday	ABC1	Saturday, 7.00 – 7:30pm	954,000
13	Australian Story	ABC1	Monday, 8.00 – 8:30pm	887,000
14	The 7.30 Report	ABC1	Monday-Thursday, 7.30 – 8:00pm	885,000
15	Four Corners	ABC1	Monday, 8.30 – 9:30 pm	847,000

== Weekly ratings – 2009 ==
- Data based on the five metropolitan markets only according to OzTam weekly data released every Tuesday at their website.

Week	Network shares
Week	ABC News	Seven News	National Nine News	Ten News	World News
1	1,105,000 Sydney 307,000 Melbourne 342,000 Brisbane 194,000 Adelaide 117,000 Perth 145,000	1,215,000 Sydney 311,000 Melbourne 328,000 Brisbane 226,000 Adelaide 147,000 Perth 203,000	1,088,000 Sydney 305,000 Melbourne 350,000 Brisbane 242,000 Adelaide 106,000 Perth 85,000	770,000 Sydney 195,000 Melbourne 223,000 Brisbane 137,000 Adelaide 89,000 Perth 126,000	195,000
2	1,200,000	1,250,000	1,131,000	770,000	197,000
3	1,049,000	1,301,000	1,365,000	922,000	199,000
4	1,184,000	1,544,000	1,289,000	858,000	285,000
5	1,278,000	1,590,000	1,194,000	850,000	280,000
6	1,194,000	1,596,000	1,276,000	969,000	190,000
7	1,120,000 Sydney 315,000 Melbourne 224,000 Brisbane 224,000 Adelaide 107,000 Perth 123,000	1,371,000 Sydney 395,000 Melbourne 347,000 Brisbane 275,000 Adelaide 153,000 Perth 200,000	1,274,000 Sydney 341,000 Melbourne 410,000 Brisbane 266,000 Adelaide 150,000 Perth 108,000	779,000 Sydney 186,000 Melbourne 220,000 Brisbane 152,000 Adelaide 96,000 Perth 126,000	180,000
8	1,094,000 Sydney 304,000 Melbourne 323,000 Brisbane 232,000 Adelaide 116,000 Perth 119,000	1,388,000 Sydney 392,000 Melbourne 366,000 Brisbane 267,000 Adelaide 155,000 Perth 208,000	1,169,000 Sydney 306,000 Melbourne 367,000 Brisbane 243,000 Adelaide 145,000 Perth 109,000	992,000	135,000
9	1,075,000 Sydney 316,000 Melbourne 328,000 Brisbane 207,000 Adelaide 106,000 Perth 118,000	1,434,000 Sydney 400,000 Melbourne 385,000 Brisbane 292,000 Adelaide 151,000 Perth 206,000	1,146,000 Sydney 297,000 Melbourne 354,000 Brisbane 249,000 Adelaide 143,000 Perth 102,000	880,000	143,000
10	1,027,000	1,377,000	1,027,000	700,000	270,000
11	1,098,000 Sydney 297,000 Melbourne 356,000 Brisbane 218,000 Adelaide 108,000 Perth 120,000	1,403,000 Sydney 365,000 Melbourne 363,000 Brisbane 296,000 Adelaide 169,000 Perth 209,000	1,150,000 Sydney 292,000 Melbourne 378,000 Brisbane 240,000 Adelaide 146,000 Perth 95,000	720,000	200,000
12	1,029,000 Sydney 302,000 Melbourne 305,000 Brisbane 199,000 Adelaide 103,000 Perth 120,000	1,301,000 Sydney 361,000 Melbourne 360,000 Brisbane 288,000 Adelaide 151,000 Perth 201,000	1,103,000 Sydney 268,000 Melbourne 359,000 Brisbane 258,000 Adelaide 129,000 Perth 89,000	898,000	202,000
13	1,099,000 Sydney 310,000 Melbourne 321,000 Brisbane 205,000 Adelaide 99,000 Perth 165,000	1,465,000 Sydney 415,000 Melbourne 391,000 Brisbane 297,000 Adelaide 157,000 Perth 205,000	1,183,000 Sydney 291,000 Melbourne 396,000 Brisbane 266,000 Adelaide 137,000 Perth 90,000	730,000	137,000
14	1,090,000 Sydney 279,000 Melbourne 350,000 Brisbane 211,000 Adelaide 110,000 Perth 140,000	1,385,000 Sydney 350,000 Melbourne 368,000 Brisbane 296,000 Adelaide 153,000 Perth 218,000	1,129,000 Sydney 275,000 Melbourne 375,000 Brisbane 253,000 Adelaide 130,000 Perth 95,000	990,000	130,000
15	1,123,000 Sydney 331,000 Melbourne 340,000 Brisbane 202,000 Adelaide 112,000 Perth 134,000	1,464,000 Sydney 392,000 Melbourne 380,000 Brisbane 302,000 Adelaide 157,000 Perth 234,000	1,160,000 Sydney 298,000 Melbourne 380,000 Brisbane 257,000 Adelaide 128,000 Perth 98,000	998,000	190,000
16	1,071,000	1,492,000	1,215,000	750,000	250,000
17	1,181,000	1,549,000 Sydney 436,000 Melbourne 409,000 Brisbane 315,000 Adelaide 165,000 Perth 224,000	1,214,000 Sydney 319,000 Melbourne 374,000 Brisbane 267,000 Adelaide 144,000 Perth 110,000	800,000	180,000
18	1,137,000 Sydney 313,000 Melbourne 362,000 Brisbane 209,000 Adelaide 112,000 Perth 141,000	1,514,000 Sydney 425,000 Melbourne 390,000 Brisbane 302,000 Adelaide 171,000 Perth 225,000	1,218,000 Sydney 335,000 Melbourne 384,000 Brisbane 251,000 Adelaide 147,000 Perth 101,000	825,000	225,000
19	1,175,000 Sydney 324,000 Melbourne 391,000 Brisbane 212,000 Adelaide 102,000 Perth 145,000	1,488,000 Sydney 425,000 Melbourne 367,000 Brisbane 292,000 Adelaide 162,000 Perth 242,000	1,237,000 Sydney 328,000 Melbourne 379,000 Brisbane 270,000 Adelaide 148,000 Perth 113,000	892,000	292,000
20	1,036,000	1,511,000 Sydney 410,000 Melbourne 406,000 Brisbane 305,000 Adelaide 166,000 Perth 224,000	1,190,000 Sydney 339,000 Melbourne 367,000 Brisbane 241,000 Adelaide 134,000 Perth 109,000	995,000	125,000
21	1,144,000	1,502,000 Sydney 430,000 Melbourne 377,000 Brisbane 283,000 Adelaide 166,000 Perth 246,000	1,278,000 Sydney 340,000 Melbourne 413,000 Brisbane 267,000 Adelaide 138,000 Perth 119,000	800,000	252,000
22	1,150,000 Sydney 323,000 Melbourne 371,000 Brisbane 215,000 Adelaide 99,000 Perth 141,000	1,518,000 Sydney 415,000 Melbourne 373,000 Brisbane 325,000 Adelaide 168,000 Perth 238,000	1,247,000 Sydney 338,000 Melbourne 420,000 Brisbane 254,000 Adelaide 139,000 Perth 96,000	900,000	191,000
23	1,193,000 Sydney 321,000 Melbourne 377,000 Brisbane 229,000 Adelaide 106,000 Perth 161,000	1,541,000 Sydney 425,000 Melbourne 371,000 Brisbane 334,000 Adelaide 168,000 Perth 243,000	1,224,000 Sydney 331,000 Melbourne 386,000 Brisbane 249,000 Adelaide 145,000 Perth 113,000	750,000	180,000
