= Titmus =

Titmus is a surname. Notable people with the surname include:

- Ariarne Titmus (born 2000), Australian swimmer
- Fred Titmus (1932–2011), English cricketer
- Steve Titmus (fl. from 1979), Australian journalist
