= Nine News Queensland =

Australian TV news program

- Also known as: Channel 9 News (1959–1969); National Nine News (1969–1976, 1980–2008); 9 Eyewitness News (1976–1980)
- Genre: News
- Presented by: News: Melissa Downes (weeknights); Joel Dry (weeknights); Mia Glover (weekends); Sport: Bronte Gildea (weeknights); Dominique Loudon (weekends); Weather: Garry Youngberry (Sunday – Thursday); Luke Bradnam (Friday – Saturday)
- Country of origin: Australia
- Original language: English

Production
- Production locations: Brisbane, Queensland
- Running time: One hour (including commercials)

Original release
- Network: Nine Network
- Release: 17 August 1959 – present

Nine News Queensland is the flagship state-based news bulletin of the Nine Network in Brisbane, Queensland, Australia. Like all Nine News bulletins, the Queensland bulletin runs for one hour nightly at 6:00pm. The bulletin also airs, albeit on a half-hour delay, in the Northern Territory. It comprises local, national and international news, as well as sport, weather and finance.

Unlike the other four metropolitan bulletins, this local edition of Nine News is addressed on-air by its state, rather than its city.

== Simulcast ==
The 6pm bulletin is simulcast in Brisbane on commercial radio station River 94.9, across regional Queensland on the WIN Network as well as through NTD in Darwin and throughout remote eastern and central Australia on Imparja Television.

== History ==
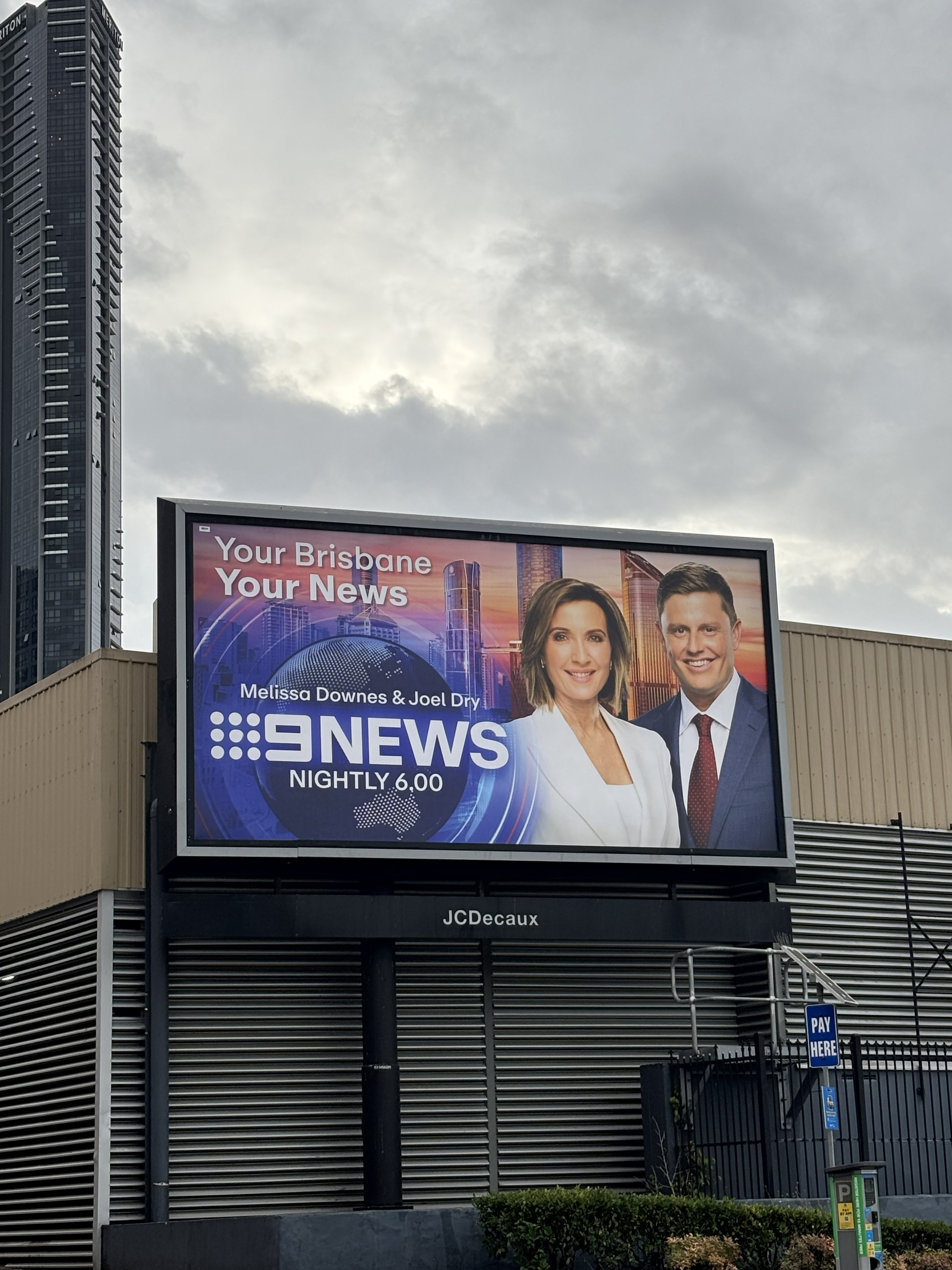
A promo for Nine News Queensland as seen on a billboard in Fortitude Valley, Queensland.

Bruce Paige and Heather Foord co-anchored the 6:00pm bulletin from 1995 until 2001, when Foord joined Mike London as a weekend presenter and Jillian Whiting replaced her on weeknights. London resigned in June 2003 after allegations emerged that he had organised a female friend to complain about the presentation of weeknight presenter Bruce Paige. Foord and Whiting swapped positions in 2004 with Melissa Downes taking over as weekend presenter in 2006.

Foord resigned as weeknight presenter on 5 December 2008 and was replaced by Melissa Downes on weeknights with Eva Milic and former ABC news presenter Andrew Lofthouse fronting weekend bulletins. A year later, Bruce Paige stepped down from the weeknight chair (he was replaced by Lofthouse) and Heather Foord returned to present weekend bulletins solo for two years. Paige returned to full-time newsreading in January 2012, fronting Nine Gold Coast News solo until he was paired with Wendy Kingston in July 2016.

In February 2018, in a minor network reshuffle, Alison Ariotti stepped down from the Weekend role. Darren Curtis anchored the bulletin before he was replaced by then-Nine News Regional Queensland presenter Jonathan Uptin.

In January 2023, long-serving sports presenter Wally Lewis resigned from the role, citing health concerns. He was replaced by Jonathan Uptin, who formerly presented the weekend news between 2018 and 2022. His position was subsequently taken over by Mia Glover.

In January 2025, Lofthouse announced that he would step down from presenting the bulletin, with immediate effect.

In May 2025, Nine announced that Joel Dry would return to the network, succeeding Andrew Lofthouse and joining Melissa Downes as co-presenter starting in August. With the end of a full local newscast services for Darwin's NTD in 2025, the Queensland bulletin thus expanded its presence again to the Northern Territory, with NTD's news department effectively serving as a district service under QTQ's for news items from the region.

=== Ratings ===
Throughout the 1990s, and right up until the mid-2000s, Nine News Queensland was the clear-cut ratings leader in Brisbane. However, when weatherman John Schluter resigned just short of what would have been his 25th anniversary with the Nine Network towards the end of 2006 (subsequently joining the rival Seven News Brisbane), sports presenter Wally Lewis took sick leave after collapsing on-air during a nightly bulletin in November of the same year, and rival Seven Brisbane poached then-Today news presenter Sharyn Ghidella from Nine shortly after to read its weekend news (and later weeknights), the ratings declined, and in 2007, Nine News Queensland would lose its long-standing ratings dominance in the local market to the rival Seven News Brisbane. After Andrew Lofthouse and Melissa Downes took over as the chief co-presenters in mid-2009, Nine News Queensland would start to chip away at Seven's lead, and since 2013 has again been the top-rating news bulletin in Brisbane, except for 2018–19 when it briefly lost its ratings lead to Seven News Brisbane.

=== "Choppergate" controversy ===
The Nine News Queensland bulletins on 20 and 21 August 2011 included live coverage each night by reporters Melissa Mallet and Cameron Price, respectively, from the station's helicopter, which they claimed was "near Beerwah", where the remains of murdered schoolboy Daniel Morcombe had been found earlier that month. The reports were revealed to be fake when, on the second night, rival station Channel Seven recorded video of the Nine helicopter sitting on the helipad outside their studios at Mount Coot-tha at the time of the broadcast. Radar footage also revealed that, on the first night, the helicopter was actually hovering over Chapel Hill, 70 km (43 mi) away from Beerwah. Both Mallet and Price, as well as news producer Aaron Wakeley, were sacked by the Nine Network following the incident, and news director Lee Anderson accepted responsibility and resigned over the faked reports. Despite the scandal, Nine experienced a spike in its 6:00 pm news ratings in the weeks that followed, managed to win more weeks than it did in the previous three years combined (winning seven of the 32 ratings weeks up to the first week of October), and recovered to reclaim its mantle as Queensland's most-watched news service by 2013.

== Presenters ==
Current presenters
Role	Bulletins						
Role	Monday	Tuesday	Wednesday	Thursday	Friday	Saturday	Sunday
News	Melissa Downes (2009–present); Joel Dry (2025–present)					Mia Glover (2023–present)	
Sport	Bronte Gildea (2026–present)					Dominique Loudon (2023–present)	
Weather	Garry Youngberry (2009–present)				Luke Bradnam (2016–present)		Gary Youngberry (2009–present)

=== Fill-in presenters ===
When one of the co-presenters is absent, the bulletin is presented by the remaining anchor. However, the primary fill-in anchors are Wendy Kingston, Aislin Kriukelis, Alison Ariotti and Paul Taylor. Other fill-in presenters include

- Adam Jackson (sport)
- Luke Bradnam (weather)
- Abbey Geran (weather)

=== News ===
- Andrew Lofthouse (2009–2024)
- Bruce Paige (1985–1990, 1993–2009)
- Heather Foord (1989–2008, 2009–2011)
- Mike London (1986–2003)
- Jillian Whiting (1998–2008)
- Eva Milic (2009, July 2011 – October 2014)
- Darren Curtis (October 2014 – February 2018)
- Alison Ariotti (October 2014 – February 2018)
- Sophie Walsh (first half of 2016)
- Frank Warrick (1984–1985)
- Don Seccombe (1960's–1985)
- Paul Griffin (1973–1983)

=== Sport ===
- Chris Bombolas
- Steve Haddan
- Ian Healy
- Sam Squiers
- Wally Lewis

=== Weather ===
- Sami Lukis
- Joseph May
- John Schluter
- Frank Warrick

== Reporters ==
=== News ===
- **Jessica Millward**
- **Reece D'Alessandro**
- **Peter Fegan**
- Abbey Geran
- Annie Pullar
- Clare Todhunter
- Ha Teya Gripske
- Jiselle Manning
- Makenna Baily
- Kaitlyn Smith
- Anna Rawlings
- Ned Balme
- Bella Schwarzenecker
- Jakob Funk
- Pat Heagney
- Kate Lambe
- Michelle Tapper
- Emily Prain (crime reporter)

*Bold indicates the senior reporters

=== Sport ===
- Dominique Loudon
- Adam Jackson
- Bronte Gildea
- Matt Tsimpikas
- Ben Dobbin
- Mark Gottlieb

=== Notable former reporters ===
- Alex Bernhardt
- Neil Doorley – now a Senior Media Adviser with Queensland Government
- Spencer Jolly – now retired
- Alyshia Gates – now with the Special Broadcasting Service
- Brittney Kleyn – now with ABC News
- Melissa Mallet (2009–2011)
- Paris Martin – now with 10 News Sydney
- Ashley McDermid
- Cameron Price (2008–2011)
- Nat Wallace – now with A Current Affair
- Sophie Walsh (2011–2016) – now with Nine News Sydney
- Phil Willmington – now retired
- Lane Calcutt (state political reporter) – now a Senior Media Adviser with Queensland Government
- Tim Arvier
- Michael Atkinson
