= NTD (Australian TV station) =

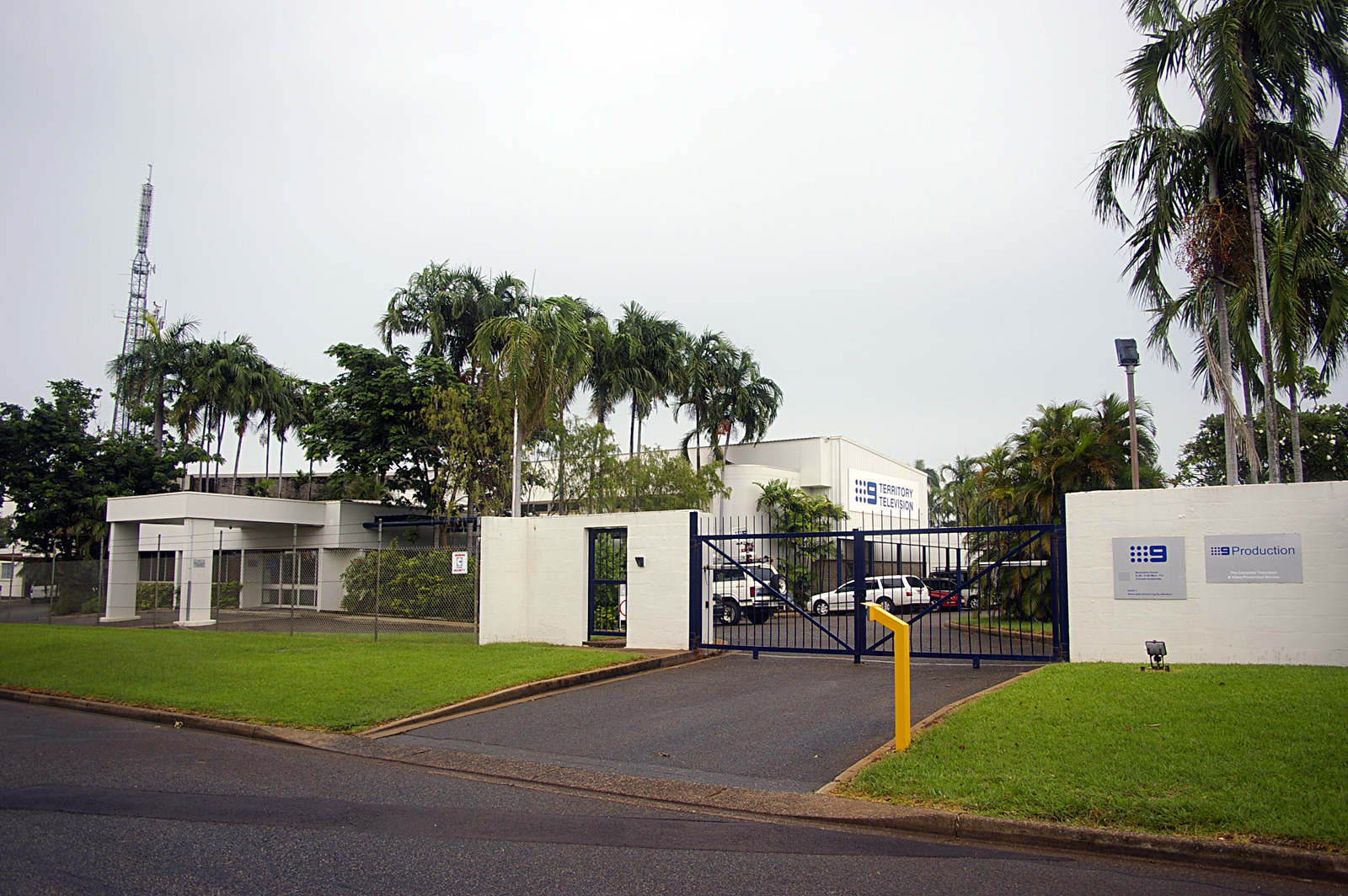
- NTD's current studios in The Gardens.
- Darwin, Northern Territory; Australia
- Channels: Digital: 31 (UHF); Virtual: 9
- Branding: Nine

Programming
- Language: English
- Affiliations: Nine

Ownership
- Owner: WIN Corporation; (Territory Television Pty Ltd)

History
- Founded: 1968
- First air date: 11 November 1971
- Former channel number: Analog: 8 (VHF) (1971–2013)
- Former affiliations: Independent (1971–1998); Ten (secondary, 1998–2002; per program, 2002–2005)
- Call sign meaning: Northern Territory/Darwin

Technical information
- Licensing authority: ACMA
- ERP: 85 kW
- HAAT: 147 m
- Transmitter coordinates: 12°24′52″S 130°58′9″E

NTD is an Australian television station, licensed to and serving Darwin, Palmerston and surrounding areas. The station is owned and operated by WIN Corporation, and is a Nine Network affiliated station, under the company name Territory Television Pty. Ltd. Their studios are located at 6 Blake Street in The Gardens, and offices located at 82 Mitchell Street in Darwin.

Until January 2025, the station was the only commercial television network in the Northern Territory to broadcast a full local news bulletin on weeknights. It has also produced local programs airing across the entire Nine Network, such as Driving Test (2018) and Catching the Chase: Barra Nationals (2018).

== History ==
=== Origins ===
In March 1968, the Postmaster General announced a bid for a commercial television station in Darwin, which was set to start during 1970. In the wake of the announcement, TTPL was formed, with mayor Bill Richardson as its chairman. A number of local businesses were its shareholders. Public hearings for the television licence began in March 1970, with two bids, the existing TTPL bid and the Electronics Industry-backed Territory Telecasters Pty. Ltd.; the former winning on 1 October 1970 and granting the NTD callsign and the VHF allocation (channel 8) a few days later.

In the wake of the bid, TTPL began negotiations with the Postmaster General government to build a shared television transmitter, which was also set to be used by ABD-6, the ABC station. Construction work for the mast was conducted between November 1970 and February 1971, followed by a transmitter, pre-fabricated by AWA of Sydney, and finished in June.

Mayoral commitments led to the resignation of Bill Richardson as TTPL chairman in December 1970. The post was filled by John Hickman. It was initially scheduled to open in June 1971, two months ahead of ABD, but due to problems with the PMG and the ABCB, the launch of the station was pushed back several times. After a final consensus at the insistence of Fred Yates, the station announced an 11 November 1971 launch date. Richardson ended up dying one week ahead of launch, never witnessing the culmination of his efforts alive.

=== 1970s ===
Test transmissions were held on 9 November 1971, consisting of test patterns and documentaries.

NTD-8 was officially launched at 8:00 pm on 11 November 1971, with the opening lineup beginning at 5:30 pm with Skippy the Bush Kangaroo, followed by Bandstand at 6:00 pm and at 7:00 pm, An Evening with Burt Bacharach.

The station was officially inaugurated at 8:00 pm by Northern Territory Administrator, Fred Chaney, followed by speeches from Sir Myles Wright, Fred Yates, John Hickman, and assistant executive John May.

The opening lineup continued with All the King's Men at 8:30pm and Danger Man at 10:30pm. The station closed for the night at 11 pm.

The station was completely destroyed by Cyclone Tracy in December 1974 and was off air for 10 months while it was rebuilt entirely.

While the government-backed ABD got quick to restore (reopening on 4 January 1975), TTPL faced a number of problems, including the decrease of the population in the months after Tracy, the lack of funds and the need to convert its equipment to colour. The station reopened at 6 Blake Street in the Darwin suburb of The Gardens, with full colour, on 27 October 1975 (an initial June 1975 target was initially expected but was failed), ten months after the cyclone, with John Lewis as Manager, with on air operators Gavin Ashton, Steve Mariner and Ross Jamieson. Daryl Potts was chief engineer until he died in 1979. Robert Potts was studio cameraman and on air operator. The relaunched station operated on a limited three-hour schedule.

=== 1980s ===
Improvements in the post-Tracy years, coupled with the rise of tourism to Darwin, led to TTPL investing A$2 million in upgrades, which were completed by 1982. By then, NTD was broadcasting for twelve hours a day.

NTD did not run any news and current affairs programming until 18 October 1982, after the station hired Rex Clark as a news director to launch a nightly bulletin at 7:00pm entitled News at Seven, with original presenters Clive Murray and Jan Gurion, alongside a current affairs program entitled Spectrum. Up until then, only ABD carried news bulletins, as it was the only one to have a microwave link. NTD received one from the Seven Network and began a partnership with its news department.

In 1981 the daytime chat show Grapevine was hosted by Judith Noble (née Billington; Balcazar since 1990). Live on-air presentation was directed and produced by Peter Miller; cameraman was Headly Trigg.

In the late 1980s, NTD was purchased by Publishing and Broadcasting Limited (PBL), the owners of the Nine Network at that time, following a failed bid to reach remote Central Australia via satellite, which was won by Imparja Television. Following the purchase, NTD adopted a similar on-air presentation to the Nine Network, though replacing the "9" with an "8". NTD's news service was revamped and rebranded along with the station, to become Eight National News.

=== 1990s ===
NTD was the sole commercial television station in Darwin until 1998, when Telecasters Australia launched Seven Darwin. However, for several years, NTD remained the sole locally based station in the city, as Seven Darwin was little more than a relay for Seven Central.

Territory Television Pty. Ltd. attempted to gain Seven Network affiliation rights prior to Seven Darwin's launch, in a strategic move to dominate and force the incoming competitor to align with Network Ten. This would have seen NTD broadcast both Nine Network and Seven Network programming, however after being rejected affiliation, the station gained Network Ten affiliation to supplement their parent company's Nine Network programming.

=== 2000s ===
On New Year's Day 2003, Eight Darwin became Nine Darwin, in line with the rest of Kerry Packer's Nine Network owned-and-operated stations, though it continued to operate on channel 8. At the same time, the station dropped most Ten programming from the line-up (leaving only the AFL rights and Ten's top-rated programmes), and in 2005, the Network Ten affiliation rights were officially relinquished, and were then taken by TND in 2005.

In 2005, in the midst of the tug-of-war for the AFL television rights, PBL announced that National Rugby League games will take precedence on the station over AFL games, a sign that Nine may have been about to give up the race for the rights to a proposed Seven-Ten consortium, which they did, but not without putting in a $780 million bid for the rights.

In 2008, Nine Darwin (NTD) began broadcasting Nine HD. In April 2008, Darwin Digital Television (DTD), a joint venture between the Nine Network and Macquarie Southern Cross Media, began broadcasting on the digital terrestrial platform as a full-time Network Ten affiliate.

The same year, it was speculated that Imparja Television, the Nine affiliate for most of the rest of the Territory, was planning to purchase the station from the Nine Network. The deal would have involved the sale of the station, as well as its facilities and licence. Negotiations for the sale of the station fell through on 29 September, when Imparja failed to secure federal government funding to help finance the takeover.

=== 2010s ===
The analogue signal for NTD was turned off at 9:00 am CST on Tuesday 30 July 2013.

In July 2017, it was reported that the station's nightly news program, Nine News Darwin, would move its studio presentation from Darwin to Nine's Brisbane studios and replace local weekend bulletins with delayed broadcasts of the Queensland bulletin. The last standalone edition of Nine News Darwin aired on 8 September 2017. The bulletin returned on Monday 11 September 2017, in a new regional hub in Brisbane. The changes were heavily criticised by the public, with 12 employees at the network being made redundant or offered redeployment in other locations. After the initial cuts, the newsroom was left with a chief of staff, four reporters and four camera operators filing reports interstate. Subsequent cuts further reduced the newsroom with a chief of staff, three reporters and three camera operators.

In April 2019, the network made the announcement that they will be decommissioning the Blake Street studios to move to a newer site in the Darwin CBD on Mitchell Street. NTD moved to the new facility in December 2019. It spans two floors with general offices, a newsroom and a studio.

=== 2020s ===
In January 2025, the 6pm news for Darwin was abruptly axed and replaced by the equivalent 6pm Queensland bulletin broadcast from Brisbane.

In October 2025, Nine Darwin once again relaunched local news into the Northern Territory. The news is presented as 3x 2 minutes 30 seconds updates on weeknights from NBN Television Newcastle, with Kyrrie Blenkinsop filing stories from the Darwin newsroom.

In February 2026, it was announced Nine Darwin would be acquired by WIN Television (owned by WIN Corporation), expanding broadcast operations into the NT. The acquisition was completed on 2 June 2026.

Under WIN ownership, it was announced that a local edition of WIN News would commence broadcasts in late 2026.

== Programming ==
=== Nine News Darwin (1982–2025) ===
The station's local news service, Nine News Darwin, aired at 6:00 pm each weeknight. The news reports were filed from the NTD newsroom in Darwin and the bulletin aired live from the QTQ studios in Brisbane. Reporters and camera crews covering the Darwin area were based locally at the NTD studios. Afternoon and weekend bulletins were a delayed broadcast of Nine Afternoon News Sydney and Nine News Queensland, with no local opt-outs, respectively. The weeknight bulletin was simulcasted on radio on 104.1 Territory FM, and also aired on Imparja 9Gem as a delayed broadcast for viewers outside of NTD's broadcasting area.

Nine News Darwin was launched on 18 October 1982 as Eight News at Seven, alongside a current affairs program entitled Spectrum. The news service was later rebranded to Eight National News in the late 1980s.

On New Year's Day 2003, the news service was revamped following the change of branding to Nine Darwin across the station. The service became National Nine News on weeknights from 6:00 pm with local news and weather opt-outs during the Sydney bulletin on weekends.

In July 2011, the station debuted a new look for their news service including a new set to match those used in the metropolitan bulletins. This also included the implementation of locally produced weekend news bulletins for the Darwin area, presented by Amy Culpitt.

In April 2016, Nine News Darwin expanded to one hour between 6:00 pm and 7:00 pm nightly.

In September 2017, the bulletin relocated its studio presentation from Darwin to the Brisbane studios, with the last locally produced bulletin from the NTD studios aired on 8 September. The format, first aired on 11 September, was presented as a recorded joint interstate composite bulletin with regional Queensland and was anchored by Jonathan Uptin and Samantha Heathwood. The bulletin included opt-outs for local news, sport and weather. In February 2018, Uptin was promoted as the sports and weekend presenter for Nine News Queensland and was subsequently replaced by Paul Taylor.

In March 2020, the Nine Network temporarily suspended their regional news bulletins due to the COVID-19 pandemic. As a result, Nine News Darwin reverted to a short, local format from NTD's makeshift studio. Anchored by Kathleen Gazzola, and also presented by Zarisha Bradley, Amy Clements and Tahlia Sarv, they are shown as opt-outs during the Queensland bulletin from 6:30pm as well as during advertisement breaks at primetime. Smaller news segments, as well as news coverage during weekends, are uploaded to the Nine News Darwin Facebook page.

On 15 September 2020, it was announced that Nine News Darwin will return to air weeknights from 5 October 2020, returning to the previous dedicated live local format seen in pre-2017. Paul Taylor returned as its main presenter, with local reporters on rotation to present the weather in various locations across Darwin.

On 22 January 2025, Nine announced that the local 6 pm Darwin bulletin would be axed effective immediately. Three full-time roles were made redundant, while the other eight were redeployed into other positions. Consequently, the final bulletin for 9News Darwin went to air on 21 January 2025. Darwin now receives 9News Queensland nightly at 6pm, broadcast live from studios in Brisbane. One reporter and one camera operator will remain in Darwin to cover stories for the Northern Territory, which will now be aimed at a national audience.

Prior to 22 January 2025, Nine was the only commercial TV network to produce a local news bulletin for Darwin, and was one of the two major free-to-air broadcasters to do so. National broadcaster ABC is now the only free-to-air broadcaster to produce a local TV news bulletin for Darwin.

==== Former on-air staff ====
- Jonathan Uptin (now Nine News Queensland presenter)
- Allan Raskall (now Nine News Melbourne journalist)
- Allison Langdon (now A Current Affair journalist)
- Charles Croucher (sport and weekend presenter, now Nine's political editor)
- Kyrrie Blenkinsop (sport and weekend presenter)
- Angelina Anictomatis (sport and weekend presenter)
- Lisa Andrews (sport and weekend presenter)
- Zara James (weekend presenter, now with Nine News Sydney)
- Leah Hannon
- Tim Arvier (now with Nine News Queensland)
- David Fidler
- Theona Mitaros (her daughter, Elle Georgiou, is a reporter on Seven News Perth)
- Amy Culpitt (now ABC News NT weekend presenter)
- Jake Hauritz (sport presenter)
- Henry Jones (sport presenter)
- Samantha Heathwood (now with Seven News Queensland)
- Amy Clements (now with Seven News Sydney)
- Jack Hahn (now a reporter on The Today Show)
- Olivana Lathouris (now ABC News NT journalist)
- Jan Lovegrove and Roger Howe, hosts of 1330
- Col Krohn Mick Stumbles, Sportscene
- Peter Miller, host of SPECTRUM
