= ABD (TV station) =

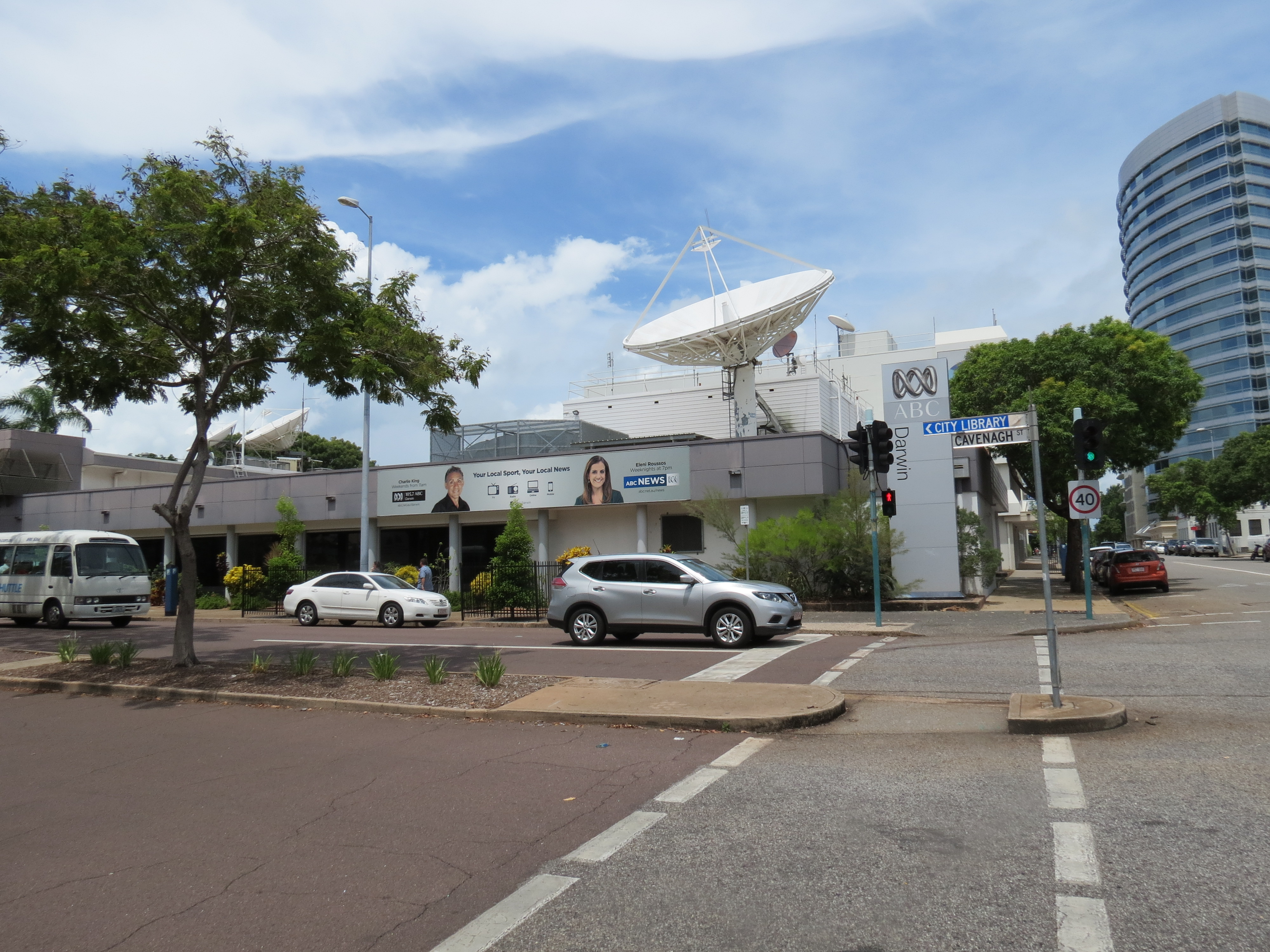
- Darwin, Northern Territory; Australia
- Channels: Digital: 30 (UHF); Virtual: 2

Programming
- Language: English
- Network: ABC Television

Ownership
- Owner: Australian Broadcasting Corporation

History
- First air date: 13 August 1971
- Former channel number: Analog: 6 (VHF) (1971–2013)
- Call sign meaning: ABC/Darwin

Technical information
- Licensing authority: Australian Communications and Media Authority
- ERP: 85 kW
- HAAT: 147 m
- Transmitter coordinates: 12°24′52″S 130°58′9″E

Links
- Website: www.abc.net.au/tv

ABD is the call sign of the Australian Broadcasting Corporation's television station in Darwin, Northern Territory. The station was the first to go to air in Darwin, on 13 August 1971. Its studios are located in the inner city of Darwin, with (the now defunct) analogue transmitter owned by the Nine Network on Blake Street in The Gardens and digital transmitter on Deloraine Road. The station is received throughout the territory through a number of relay transmitters, as well as by satellite on the Viewer Access Satellite Television (formerly Optus Aurora) platform.

== Programming ==
ABD follows a schedule similar to ABC's statewide stations, opting out regularly for local news, current affairs, and sports programming.

ABC Darwin also produced its edition of 7.30 until December 2014, when Quentin Dempster announced the final episode of the state editions would be the following week (Friday, 5 December 2014), corresponding with his departure from the public broadcaster.

ABD previously aired live coverage of Northern Territory Football League matches every Saturday afternoon during the season. However, ABC lost rights to SBS, which now broadcasts its coverage on NITV in the Northern Territory.

The station also broadcasts local Anzac Day services, such as the local dawn service and march, as well as the Bombing of Darwin commemorations and NT General Election specials.

The analog signal for ABD was shut off at 9.00 am CST, Tuesday, 30 July 2013, along with NTD and other stations.

=== ABC News NT ===
ABC Darwin produces a local news bulletin nightly from the Cavanagh Street studios in Darwin City. The bulletin has a duration of 30 minutes on Monday to Saturday, and 40 minutes on Sunday. The bulletin contains coverage of local stories, national, international, and a Friday segment featuring ABC Radio Darwin's The Country Hour host Matt Brann - covering local events in the agricultural industry. The weeknight bulletins also incorporate a national finance segment, presented by David Chau in Sydney.

The bulletin is presented by Kyle Dowling (every Sunday to Thursday) and Isabella Tolhurst(every Friday and Saturday).

ABC News NT is the only program produced by the network and is the only local news bulletin that is presented locally in Darwin. (NTD produced its own Darwin news bulletin, but it was presented live from QTQ in Brisbane). However, they are known to contribute heavily to the daytime program Landline. It is also now the only local news bulletin in Darwin as a whole, after commercial network Nine announced it was axing its 6pm local news bulletin for Darwin effective immediately, occurring on 22 January 2025. Consequently, the final bulletin for 9News Darwin went to air on 21 January 2025. The national network previously produced programs Stateline and 7.30 NT, however, ABC axed the local production of these programs Australia wide.

==== Presenters ====
- Kyle Dowling (Sunday to Thursday)
- Isabella Tolhurst (Friday and Saturday)

==== Reporters ====
- Dijana Aleksandrovic
- Mitchell Abram
- Jane Bardon
- Jano Gibson
- Isabella Tolhurst
- Kristy O'Brien
- Matt Garrick
- Lauren Roberts
- Jacqueline Breen
- Felicity James
- Henry Zwartz
- Kate Ashton
- Kathleen Ferguson
- Matt Brann
- Steve Vivian

== Relay stations ==
The following stations relay ABD throughout the Northern Territory:

Call	Region served	City	Channels (Analog/ digital)	First air date	3rd letter's meaning	ERP (Analog/ digital)	HAAT (Analog/ digital)^{1}	Transmitter coordinates	Transmitter location
ABAD	Alice Springs	Alice Springs	7 (VHF); 8 (VHF)	16 December 1972	Alice Springs	0.5 kW; 0.125 kW	205 m 205 m	23°43′20″S 133°51′24″E	West Gap
ABKD	Katherine	Katherine	7 (VHF); 8 (VHF)	21 December 1974	Katherine	1.2 kW; 0.3 kW	32 m 32 m	14°28′20″S 132°16′45″E	Katherine
ABTD	Tennant Creek	Tennant Creek	9 (VHF); 9A (VHF)	21 December 1974	Tennant Creek	2 kW; 0.5 kW	110 m 114 m	19°38′3″S 134°13′25″E	Tennant Creek

Notes:

- 1. HAAT estimated from http://www.itu.int/SRTM3/ using EHAAT.

== See also ==
- Television broadcasting in Australia
