= Jillian Whiting =

Australian television presenter

Jillian Whiting is an Australian television presenter.

Whiting has previously been a presenter on Nine News Queensland.

== Early life ==
Whiting was born in Mackay, Queensland on 12 July 1971, moving with her family to Brisbane after her parents divorced. The move enabled her brother Chris to attend university and so she could attend high school in Brisbane.

== Career ==
After graduating from the University of Queensland, Whiting took up a position as a research assistant in 1991 with Seven Brisbane where she later became a reporter and weekend news presenter for Seven News.

She joined Nine Brisbane in 1996 as a reporter and soon became presenter of the weekend editions of Nine News Queensland. She became co-presenter of the weekday news with Bruce Paige in 2001; together, they took the bulletin to the top of the ratings in Queensland and were presenting at the time when the September 11 attacks took place. She later returned to presenting on weekends following the birth of her first child.

In 2006 she became presenter of the Gold Coast edition of Nine Gold Coast News after production moved to Brisbane, and soon after assumed role as presenter of Extra, Nine's local tabloid current affairs program.

In December 2008, Whiting resigned from the Nine Network in Brisbane.

In January 2009, Jillian returned to Seven Brisbane where she became a presenter on Queensland Weekender, a fill-in presenter on Seven News Brisbane and occasional Sunrise reporter.

During recent years Whiting has been a presenter with Brisbane radio station 4BC and a columnist for The Courier-Mail. Whiting is currently involved in media consulting work which has included establishing her own media consulting business.

== Personal life ==
Whiting is married and has two children.

Whiting has a sister and a brother, Chris.

In 2009, Whiting said she regretted keeping her maiden name when she married her husband.

Media offices
Preceded by Samantha Kume	Nine News Queensland; Weekend presenter with Mike London; January 1997 – 2001	Succeeded by Heather Foord
Preceded by Heather Foord	Nine News Queensland; Weeknight presenter with Bruce Paige; 2001–2004	Succeeded by Heather Foord
Preceded by Heather Foord	Nine News Queensland; Weekend presenter 2004–2006	Succeeded by Melissa Downes
