= Tony Auden =

Australian meteorologist

- Born: Melbourne, Victoria, Australia
- Education: Monash University (2005)
- Occupation: Meteorologist
- Spouse: Alicia Auden

Anthony Auden is an Australian meteorologist.

He is currently weather presenter on Seven News Brisbane.

== Career ==
Auden studied a Bachelor of Science, majoring in Meteorology and Mathematics at Monash University which he completed in 2005. He later gained employment with the Bureau of Meteorology and completed a Postgraduate Diploma in Meteorology at the head office in Melbourne.

In January 2005, Auden moved to Brisbane and joined the Bureau of Meteorology. He has extensive experience in weather having covered Cyclone Yasi, The Gap's severe thunderstorm in 2008, bushfires, floods, dangerous surf and tide events, dust storms and heat waves.

In December 2013, Auden joined Seven News Brisbane as weather presenter replacing John Schluter. He presented the weather on The Daily Edition from 2016 until 2020.

He also presents weather updates on The Latest: Seven News, and regularly appears on Sunrise.
