= Cameron Price =

Australian journalist (born 1985)

- Born: 24 September 1985 (age 41)
- Education: University of Queensland
- Occupation: Reporter
- Years active: 2008–present
- Employer(s): Nine News Queensland (2008–2011); Sky News Australia (2011–2016); Seven News Sydney (2016–2021); Sunrise (occasional appearances, 2017–2021); LeadStory (2021–present)
- Known for: Journalism
- Website: Cameron Price profile

Cameron Price (born 24 September 1985) is an Australian journalist who is the co-founder and CEO of LeadStory.

He was formerly a Sydney reporter for Sky News Australia, a Brisbane reporter for Nine News, a Sydney reporter for Seven News, and an occasional reporter for Sunrise.

== Career ==
Price obtained a Bachelor of Journalism from the University of Queensland and early in his career worked as a reporter for WIN Television in Toowoomba as well as Nine News in Brisbane.

In 2011 Price was nominated for the Walkley Young Australian Journalist of the Year award.

His career at Nine News Queensland came to a controversial end, when he was sacked along with two others for his involvement in the faking of a live news cross during a news bulletin. The event which became known as "choppergate" saw news presenter Eva Milic cross to Price who was in a helicopter reported to be "near Beerwah", however it later emerged the helicopter was on a Nine Network helipad in Mt Coot-Tha 90 kilometres away. Price began legal action against Nine, however the two parties settled out of court. Price had been due to move to Sydney to take up a position with the Nine Network in the week he was sacked.

Price then joined Sky News in 2011 as a producer, before accepting a role as on-air Sydney reporter. Price left Sky News in April 2016 and the following month joined Seven News as a reporter. He also occasionally filed reports for Sunrise. Price left Seven in June 2021, and co-founded LeadStory in the same month. LeadStory launched in September 2021.
