= Nine Gold Coast News =

- Genre: News
- Presented by: News: Paul Taylor; Eva Milic; Sport: Mikayla Sorby; Weather: Luke Bradnam (Tuesday to Friday); Garry Youngberry (Monday); Beach/Fishing: Glen Rawlings
- Country of origin: Australia
- Original language: English

Production
- Production location: Gold Coast, Queensland
- Running time: 30 minutes (including commercials)

Original release
- Network: Nine Network
- Release: 1996 – present

Nine Gold Coast News is a weeknight, local news bulletin of the Nine Network. It is screened on the Gold Coast, Queensland relay of Channel Nine from Brisbane. The bulletin first aired in 1996.

Unlike all Nine News bulletins, the Gold Coast bulletin runs for thirty minutes every weeknight. It comprises mainly local news, as well as sport, weather and boating.

Nine Gold Coast News is a regional news service for the Gold Coast, presented by Paul Taylor and Eva Milic and weather is presented by Garry Youngberry (Monday) and Luke Bradnam (Tuesday to Friday). The bulletin airs at 5:30pm on weeknights as an opt-out broadcast on QTQ-9's Gold Coast transmitters, before the main 6pm Brisbane edition of Nine News. Produced from the network's studios at Surfers Paradise, Nine Gold Coast News was also simulcast on local Gold Coast radio station Juice107.3 until early 2022 when 4CRB took over the simulcast which began in July 2022

== Current presenters ==
Current presenters
Role	Bulletins				
Role	Monday	Tuesday	Wednesday	Thursday	Friday
News	Eva Milic (2018–present); Paul Taylor (2022–present)				
Sport	Mikayla Sorby (2026–present)				
Weather	Garry Youngberry	Luke Bradnam (2013–present)			
Beach	Glen Rawlings (2016–present)				

== Past presenters ==
Presenter	Role
Jillian Whiting	News
Melissa Downes	News
Karl Stefanovic	News/Reporter
Wendy Kingston	News
Natalie Gruzlewski	News/Weather
Bruce Paige	News

== Reporters ==
- Petrina Zaphir
- Tyra Stowers
- Yasmin Bonnell
- Isabel Quinlan
- Jakob Funk
- Gracie Richter
- Jessica Worboys
- Bailey Kenzie
- Matt Tsimpikas
- Makenna Baily

== See also ==
- Seven News Gold Coast
