= Bruce Paige =

Australian news presenter

Bruce Paige (born 10 November 1948) is a former newsreader in Brisbane, Australia. He most recently presented Nine Gold Coast News alongside Eva Milic.

He previously co-presented Nine News Queensland alongside Melissa Downes, having paired with Jillian Whiting and Heather Foord prior to that.

== Career ==
First coming to prominence on television reading the ABC bulletin, Paige's career at the station began in January 1971, before he moved to Channel Nine in 1985. He left Nine in 1990 for Network Ten, but had soon moved back to his native Townsville, reading the local news there for three years. In 1994, Paige returned to Nine's statewide news as a weekend newsreader, and by 1995 was back in the weeknight position.

Paige also hosted Channel Nine's short-lived Queensland current affairs program, Eye On Queensland during 1997 and has been used in a presenting role in a number of documentaries on the network. In 2003, an incident occurred whereby then weekend newsreader Mike London was alleged to have organised a female fan to complain about the newsreading technique of Bruce Paige. It was alleged that London emailed the woman, believed to be a friend of his, to suggest that Paige "could do with a personality bypass", suggesting that London did a better job of presenting. When the story 'broke' in the Brisbane Courier Mail newspaper, Mike London resigned from Channel Nine.

Following Cyclone Larry in north Queensland, Paige delivered a series of reports from the region. These were described at the time as being quite personal, as he grew up not far from the affected areas.

In November 2008, Paige was criticized for bumbling through co-presenter Heather Foord's announcement to resign from the weeknight news presenting position. Paige showed no emotion to Foord and awkwardly commented that he respected her decision. Paige defended his comments, suggesting that he was being rushed to end the bulletin on time.

On Wednesday evening 17 June 2009, Bruce announced at the end of Nine News his intention to step down as presenter of Nine's Brisbane bulletin. He said he and his wife would start exploring the World, but he said he'd still be doing what he could to assist at Nine, adding a quote: "not goodbye but see you later". He presented his final bulletin on Friday 26 June 2009. By this point, Nine News had lost its ratings dominance in the Brisbane market.

During the summer of 2009–10, 2010–11 and 2011–12 Paige filled in for Andrew Lofthouse and Melissa Downes on Nine News Queensland, presenting the bulletin solo.

== Trivia ==
- "Paigey", as he is known, is familiar for his signoff of "That's how it is this [day]", occasionally varied to "That's not exactly how it is" for humorous effect after the final human interest story of the bulletin.
