= A Current Affair (Australian TV program) =

Australian current affairs TV show

- A Current Affair logo
- Also known as: ACA
- Genre: Current affairs
- Presented by: Allison Langdon; Deborah Knight (Saturday)
- Country of origin: Australia
- Original language: English
- No. of seasons: 8 (1971–1978); 25 (1988–)

Production
- Running time: 30 minutes, including commercials

Original release
- Network: Nine Network
- Release: 22 November 1971 – 12 April 1978
- Release: 18 January 1988 – present

A Current Affair (or ACA) is an Australian current affairs program airing weeknights and Saturday nights on the Nine Network. The program is currently hosted by Allison Langdon and Deborah Knight (Saturday). It first aired from 1971 to 1978, and was revived in 1988.

== History ==
=== 1970s ===
A Current Affair was first broadcast on 22 November 1971, with Mike Willesee, screening on the Nine Network weeknights at 9:30pm, shifting to 7:00pm in 1972. For part of its early run, the comedian and actor Paul Hogan had a comic social commentary segment. Under Willesee, ACA was a Transmedia production for the Nine Network.

When Willesee left Nine in 1974 to move to the rival 0–10 Network (now known as Network 10), journalist Mike Minehan took over presenting ACA. Other hosts included Sue Smith, Kevin Sanders and Michael Schildberger.

The original A Current Affair was cancelled on 28 April 1978 due to strong competition in the 7:00pm timeslot from Willesee at Seven on Seven Network and Graham Kennedy's Blankety Blanks on the 0–10 Network.

In 1984, Willesee returned to the Nine Network to revive the format in a series titled Willesee, screening Monday to Thursday nights at 9:30pm. The following year, Willesee moved to the earlier 6:30 p.m. timeslot and extended to five nights a week, running until 1988, when Willesee's production company, Transmedia, sold the rights to the program to the Nine Network.

=== 1988 revival ===
When Willesee left the presenting role, former 60 Minutes presenter Jana Wendt took over on 18 January 1988 and the show once again became A Current Affair. This was the same week the Seven Network's soap opera Home and Away was introduced, and in Melbourne where Derryn Hinch debuted rival current affairs program Hinch at Seven.

The Seven Network introduced direct competition with Real Life, which later became Today Tonight. Jana Wendt left the program in November 1992, unhappy with an ACA story showing topless women.

In 1993, original ACA host Mike Willesee took over for the whole year. In February 1994, Ray Martin took over. Martin signed off at the end of November 1998.

From 1999 to 2002, Mike Munro hosted. When he left the program in 2002, he returned to This Is Your Life, 60 Minutes, and later National Nine News in Sydney.

After Mike Munro's departure, Ray Martin returned in February 2003, and signed off again at the start of December 2005. During the 2005/2006 holiday period, the Nine Network announced that ACA was to be "rested" for four weeks to enable a major revamp of the production to take place. On 30 January 2006, two weeks after the program's return, ACA was re-launched with new host Tracy Grimshaw. On September 5, 2022, Grimshaw announced that she would step down as host in November 2022 after 16 years, with Allison Langdon to host from 2023.

== National edition ==
=== Weeknights ===
Tenure	Host	Notes
1971–1974	Mike Willesee	
1974–1978	Michael Schildberger	
1984–1987	Mike Willesee	Willesee, direct predecessor of A Current Affair which continued with the same format and the same theme tune
1988–1992	Jana Wendt	
1993–1994	Mike Willesee	
1994–1998	Ray Martin	
1998–2002	Mike Munro	
2003–2005	Ray Martin	
2006–2022	Tracy Grimshaw	
2023–present	Allison Langdon	

Deborah Knight, Leila McKinnon and Sylvia Jeffreys are the main fill-in presenters when Langdon is on leave. Ben Fordham, Karl Stefanovic, Dimity Clancey, Brady Halls, Peter Overton and Eddie McGuire, among others, have also filled in.

In January 2022, Tracy Grimshaw scaled back to 4 days a week hosting from Monday to Thursday with Deborah Knight hosting on Friday.

=== Weekends ===
Tenure	Host
2020–present	Deborah Knight

In March 2011, a short‑run Sunday edition was trialled.

In March 2020, a Saturday edition was launched during the ongoing COVID-19 pandemic, hosted by Deborah Knight. It was made permanent in December 2020.

=== Reporters ===
- Chris Allen (QLD reporter)
- Neil Breen (NSW reporter)
- Simon Bouda (crime editor)
- Brendan Crew (VIC reporter)
- Sam Cucchiara (VIC reporter)
- Reece D'alessandro (QLD reporter)
- Alexis Daish (VIC reporter)
- Ben Fordham (occasional reports)
- Lauren Golman (NSW reporter)
- Martin King (VIC reporter)
- Steve Marshall (NSW reporter)
- Leila McKinnon (occasional reports)
- Lizzie Pearl (NSW reporter)
- Dan Nolan (QLD reporter)
- Hannah Sinclair (NSW reporter)
- Davina Smith (QLD reporter)
- Nat Wallace (NSW reporter)
- Georgia Westgarth (VIC reporter)

== State editions ==
Launching in 1991, QTQ-9 in Brisbane produced a local version of the program, titled Extra. It carried local stories including the lead up to its NRL Grand Finals. Despite its eighteen long years of popularity and ratings success, the local current affairs program was axed, due to a major schedule cleanup for making space for Nine's now-scrapped one-hour current affairs program, This Afternoon, hosted by Andrew Daddo, Katrina Blowers and Mark Ferguson from 4:30pm weekdays starting the following Monday after its final ever broadcast. The decision was part of a push to nationalise lead-in content for the network's struggling news bulletins. The game show Hot Seat was moved to replace Extra at 5.30pm.

In 2002, NWS-9 in Adelaide produced a local version of the program hosted by weekend news presenter Georgina McGuinness. It carried national stories, but featured more local stories including the lead up to the 2002 AFL Grand Final. The Adelaide edition was short lived due to the very heavy competition of the Seven Network Adelaide's Today Tonight.

In January 2008, WIN Corporation announced that a new local version of ACA would be produced in Western Australia to replace the east coast version hosted by Tracy Grimshaw. It was hosted by Louise Momber, with special investigators Peter van Onselen and Michael Southwell. The first state based edition since Adelaide in 2002, the Perth program's initial host, former news presenter Sonia Vinci, resigned prior to the show's commencement and was replaced by Louise Momber. The program was launched on 20 October 2008. A week later on 27 October, WIN launched an Adelaide version of the show on Nine Adelaide, with Adelaide's National Nine News reporter Kate Collins presenting. Both versions were short-lived – on 30 November 2009, WIN announced that Perth and Adelaide would return to the national format.

=== Brisbane (as Extra) ===
- 2006–2008 – Jillian Whiting
- 2009 – Heather Foord

In 2009, Extra was axed with the Nine Network investing money into other areas within the network. All Extra reporters were spread across the network in other reporting capacities from A Current Affair to Nine News.

=== Adelaide ===
- 2002 – Georgina McGuinness
- 2008–2009 – Kate Collins

Michael Smyth was a fill-in presenter for Kate Collins

== Criticism ==
Like Today Tonight, the program's former rival on Seven, A Current Affair is often considered by media critics and the public at large to use sensationalist journalism – as depicted in the parody television show Frontline – and to deliberately present advertising as editorial content, as previously exposed on the ABC program Media Watch. Stories covered by ACA rotate around community issues i.e. diet fads, miracle cures, welfare cheats, shonky builders, negligent doctors, poorly run businesses and corrupt government officials.

=== Paxton controversy ===
In 1996, the show reported on the Paxton family from the impoverished Melbourne suburb of St Albans. The family were told that the show was about helping the family members to get jobs, but the version that aired claimed that the family were "dole bludgers" refusing reasonable offers of employment. After the story aired, the family received death threats.

=== Greg Hodge defamation ===
In September 2006 ACA was ordered to pay over $320,000 to former Australian swimming coach Greg Hodge in relation to indefensible defamatory allegations made in a 2003 story relating to Hodge's conduct towards a former swim student.

=== Peter Anthony Haertsch defamation ===
In March 2010 ACA was found to have defamed acclaimed plastic surgeon Peter Anthony Haertsch in allegations aired in a 2008 report about a Gold Coast woman's breast enlargement procedure, and ordered to pay $268,000 damages.

=== Lev Mizikovsky defamation ===
In June 2008 ACA broadcast a program about Queensland property developer Lev Mizikovsky. Mizikovsky sued ACA claiming he was defamed by the broadcast and in November 2011 a jury agreed, but found the defamatory meanings were defensible. Mizikovsky is now liable for costs, which are reported to exceed $2 million.

=== All-Asian mall controversy ===
On 7 November 2012, a segment was broadcast giving the impression that Asian people were taking over a shopping centre in Castle Hill, New South Wales. After numerous viewer complaints, the Australian Communications and Media Authority found the segment had breached the Commercial Television Industry Code of Practice in three clauses, including "containing inaccurate factual material", "placing gratuitous emphasis on ethnic origin" and "likely to provoke intense dislike and serious contempt on the grounds of ethnic origin". Fill-in host Leila McKinnon made an on-air apology on 13 September 2013.
