= River 94.9 =

Radio station in Ipswich, Queensland, Australia

- Ipswich, Queensland; Australia
- Broadcast area: Ipswich RA1 ()
- Frequency: 94.9 MHz FM
- Branding: River 94.9

Programming
- Language: English
- Format: Adult contemporary

Ownership
- Owner: ARN; (Star Broadcasting Network Pty Ltd)

History
- First air date: 20 February 1990
- Former call signs: 4QFM (1990–2001)
- Former frequencies: 106.9 MHz FM (1990–2001)

Technical information
- Power: 50 KW
- HAAT: 319 m

Links
- Website: Official website

River 94.9 (callsign: 4MIX) is a commercial radio station that broadcasts to South East Queensland. The station opened in February 1990, and was formerly known as Star 106.9, which used to operate on the frequency now occupied by Nova 106.9. The station was previously owned by Rural Press & Bundaberg Broadcasters, forming part of the Star Broadcasting Network, followed by Grant Broadcasters.

== History ==
=== As QFM ===
From its launch until 1997, QFM broadcast contemporary hit music format.

=== As Star 106.9 ===
In 1997, QFM rebranded as Star 106.9, dropping a CHR format for a classic hits format.

Prior to the switch to 94.9, Star's callsign was changed from 4QFM to 4MIX, supposedly to block Australian Radio Network station 97.3fm from using the Mix positioner used by its sister stations. Star 106.9 closed at 4pm on the 12th of October 2001, with It's Still Rock and Roll to Me by Billy Joel.

=== As River 94.9 ===
At 6pm, following 2 hours of transmitter tests, Star FM upgraded their transmitter and moved to 94.9 MHz in order to better broadcast into Brisbane, avoiding interference of two other very strong signals – ABC Classic FM on 106.1 and triple j on 107.7. The move to 94.9 eliminated that problem, and, on the flipside, means the station has equal to better reach than the Brisbane radio stations towards the west and Toowoomba, with a large volume of advertisements for companies and stores in those regions. As part of the change, which the station called the 'Riverlution', an hit radio format was launched. 'Wild Nights', a dance music format licensed from Central Station Records based on community radio station Wild FM was added to the late night programming from the end of January 2001. In 2005, due to complaints from the major Brisbane stations, River changed its format to Adult variety, and focused back on the Ipswich area it is licensed to.

Despite broadcasting into part of the Brisbane area, the station is not officially counted in Brisbane ratings surveys, however 2017 saw the first ever Ipswich radio survey where River 94.9 dominated (26.4%)

In 2008, River 94.9 was the official broadcaster for South-East Queensland, of the Macquarie Radio Network's Olympic Radio Coverage. It was sold in May of that year to Grant Broadcasters by owners Fairfax Media, due to diversity rules controlled by Australian Communications and Media Authority, which prevents more than 2 licences overlapping into a market owned by the same group.

In November 2021, River 94.9, along with other stations owned by Grant Broadcasters, were acquired by the Australian Radio Network. This deal will allow Grant's stations, including River 94.9, to access ARN's iHeartRadio platform in regional areas. The deal was finalized on 4 January 2022. To comply with Australian Communications & Media Authority regulations that limit the number of radio stations an owner can have in one city, ARN was forced to sell 4KQ, which it did in May 2022 to the Sports Entertainment Network.

== Current programming ==
Weekdays 5-9am: Marnie (Marnie Titheradge) & Campo (Paul Campion) for Breakfast

Weekdays 9am-1pm: Mornings with Ilija (Ilija Dugandzic)

Weekdays 1-6pm: Drive with Hinksy (Greg Hinks)

Sunday to Friday 6-7pm: Nine News Queensland TV simulcast.

Saturday 6-10am: The Saturday Start-Up

At all other times, the station takes a network feed from ARN's regional hub at Hot Tomato on the Gold Coast.
