= Andrew Lofthouse =

Australian broadcaster

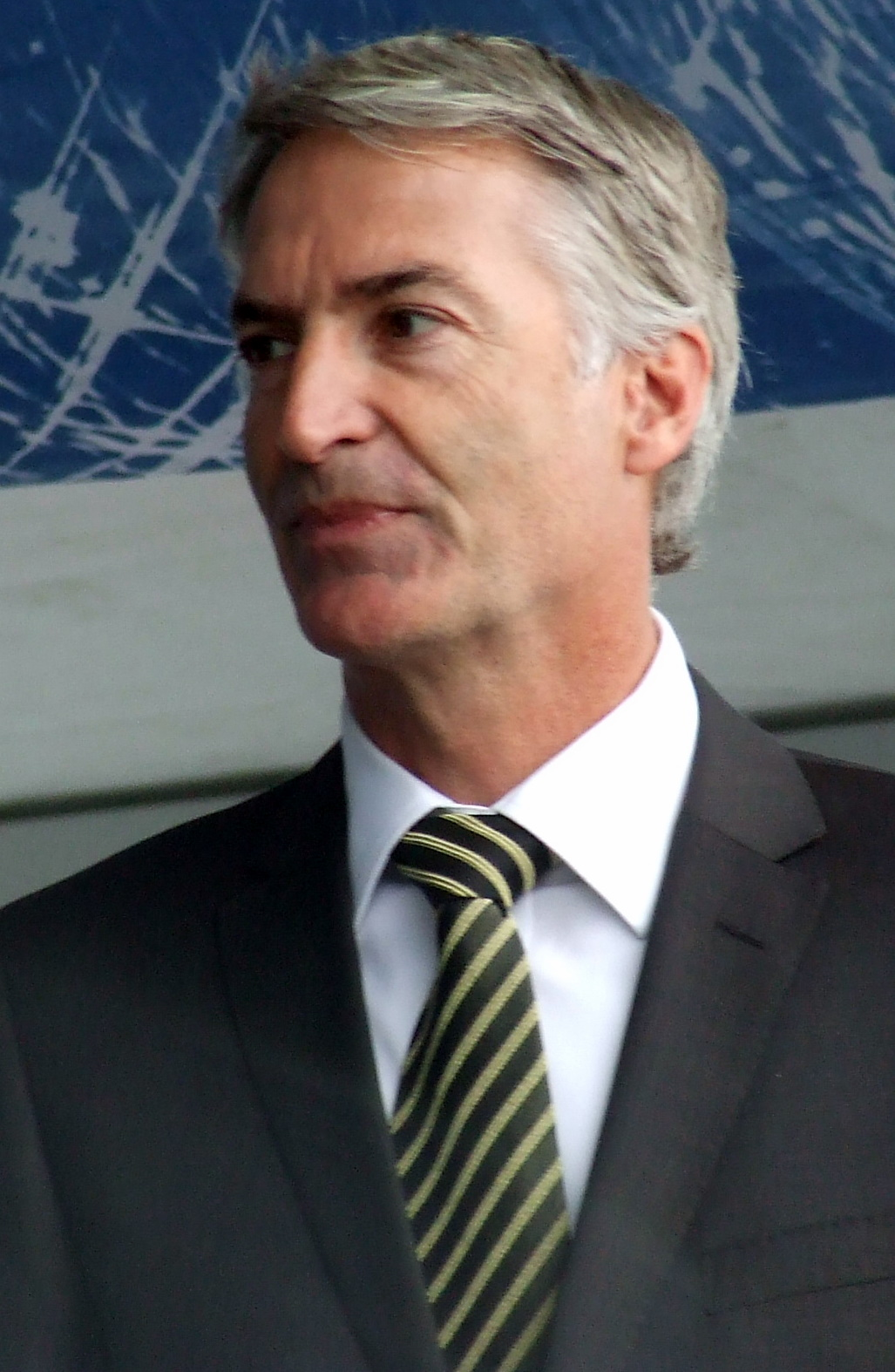

Andrew Lofthouse (born 2 June 1962) is a former television and radio newsreader based in Brisbane, Australia. The former teacher was formerly the weeknight presenter of Nine News Queensland with Melissa Downes between 2009 and 2024. Prior to working at Nine News, he presented the weekday evening news bulletin of ABC News Queensland, as well as reading the news on the 612 ABC Brisbane radio station on weekday afternoons.

== Career ==
Lofthouse started his broadcasting career at a community radio station on the Gold Coast and began working for ABC Radio (in Rockhampton) in 1990. He moved to ABC Radio Brisbane (then called 612 4QR, now 612 ABC Brisbane) at the end of 1993. In 2003, he began working on ABC television (whilst also reading ABC Radio news bulletins).

Lofthouse is also a musician with the alternative rock band Let's Go Naked which has appeared in concerts in Brisbane and released an album, Insides.

In November 2008, Lofthouse departed from ABC News, and joined the Nine News Queensland team from early 2009 as presenter of the weekend news bulletin, replacing Melissa Downes who moved to weeknight presenting. He presented his last ABC News bulletin on 28 November 2008. From 2009, Lofthouse began presenting on weekends with Eva Milic.

In June 2009, Lofthouse took over from Bruce Paige as weeknight presenter of Nine News Queensland, joining Downes on the desk. After several years in the ratings wilderness, together they would take the bulletin back to the top of the local ratings by 2013.

In January 2025, Lofthouse announced his immediate retirement from reading television news.

Media offices
Preceded by Rod Young	ABC News Queensland; Weeknight presenter 2002 – December 2008	Succeeded by David Curnow
Preceded by Melissa Downes	Nine News Queensland; Weekend presenter with Eva Milic; January 2009 – June 2009	Succeeded by Heather Foord
Preceded by Bruce Paige	Nine News Queensland; Weeknight presenter with Melissa Downes; June 2009 – November 2024	Succeeded by Joel Dry
