= Jonathan Uptin =

Australian journalist (born 1971)

- Born: 18 October 1971 (age 55); Australia
- Education: Canberra University
- Occupation: News presenter
- Years active: 2000–present
- Employer: Nine Network
- Children: 3

Jonathan Uptin (born 18 October 1971) is an Australian journalist. He was the weeknight sport presenter on Nine News Queensland.

== Career ==
Uptin has worked across Australia on a number of different platforms. After completing a communications degree at the University of Canberra, Uptin began his media career at Channel Nine in Sydney as an assistant to the chief of staff, before working as a news reporter with Prime Television and radio station 2GZ.

Uptin then joined the Nine Network, at the time Channel 8, as a sports reporter before becoming a sports presenter at NBN Television in Newcastle.

In 2000, he returned to Darwin and was appointed weeknight presenter of Eight National News and continued in this role during the conversion to Nine News. In September 2017, Nine News Darwin ceased production from the local Darwin studios, and Uptin moved to Brisbane where was appointed the co-presenter of twelve regional Queensland and Darwin bulletins with Samantha Heathwood. He remained in this position until February 2018, when a network reshuffle saw him move to presenting the weekend news on the metropolitan Nine News Queensland bulletin, as well as occasionally filling in for Wally Lewis on the sports segment. He is also occasionally a fill-in weeknight presenter on the bulletin, as well as on Weekend Today.

In January 2023, Uptin was appointed as weeknight sport presenter on Nine News Queensland, replacing Wally Lewis who stepped down for health reasons. His weekend news presenting role was subsequently taken over by Mia Glover. In November 2025, Uptin was made redundant. He subsequently trained to be a marriage celebrant.

Media offices
Preceded by David Fidler and Theona Mitaros	Nine News Darwin; Weeknight presenter 2000–2017	Succeeded by Bulletin axed
Preceded by Samantha Heathwood	Nine News regional Queensland and Darwin; Co-weeknight presenter with Samantha Heathwood; September 2017 – February 2018	Succeeded by Paul Taylor
Preceded by Darren Curtis and Alison Ariotti	Nine News Queensland; Weekend presenter 2018–2023	Succeeded by Mia Glover
Preceded by Wally Lewis	Nine News Queensland; Weeknight sport presenter January 2023 – November 2025	Succeeded by Incumbent
