= The Golden Bachelor (Australian TV series) =

- Genre: Dating game show
- Presented by: Samantha Armytage
- Country of origin: Australia
- Original language: English
- No. of seasons: 1
- No. of episodes: 9

Production
- Production location: Tresco, Elizabeth Bay, Sydney, New South Wales
- Running time: 90 minutes (including ads)
- Production company: Warner Bros. International Television Production Australia

Original release
- Network: Nine Network
- Release: 20 October 2025

Related
- The Bachelor Australia

The Golden Bachelor is an Australian dating reality television series that premiered on the Nine Network. A spin-off of The Bachelor, it features seniors as contestants. The series premiered on 20 October 2025.

The first season featured 61-year-old Barry ‘Bear’ Myrden, a widower from Sydney, Australia.

A second season was confirmed in September 2026, set to air in 2027 with two bachelors.

== Production ==
In late 2024, it was reported that an Australian version of The Golden Bachelor has been commissioned for the Nine Network. This will be the first Australian iteration of the Bachelor franchise to not be aired on Network 10, who have aired the Australian versions of The Bachelor, The Bachelorette and Bachelor in Paradise. In October 2024, the series was confirmed by Nine at their 2025 Upfronts, with Samantha Armytage to host the series and produced by Warner Bros. International Television Production Australia. In September 2025, Nine announced The Golden Bachelor as 61-year-old Sydneysider Barry ‘Bear’ Myrden along with the 20 women competing on the series.

== Contestants ==
The 20 contestants were announced on 15 September 2025.

Name	Age	Occupation	State	Eliminated
Sunny Long	58	CEO	NSW	Winner
Janette	61	Pilates Studio Owner	VIC	Runner-up
Kim	60	Doctor	QLD	Episode 8
Gera	52	Real Estate Business Owner	WA	Episode 7
Jan Herdman	66	Age Transformation Coach	NSW	Episode 7
Catherine	56	Interior Designer	NSW	Episode 6
Lauren	60	Dressage Team Manager	QLD	Episode 6
Terri	61	Property Investor	VIC	Quit; Episode 5
Bianca Dye	51	Radio Presenter	QLD	Episode 5
Elizete	54	Property Manager	NSW	Episode 5
Pip	60	Hoist Operator	VIC	Episode 5
Shamse Willmott	60	Interior Designer	VIC	Episode 5
Katrina	55	NICU Nurse	QLD	Episode 4
Laura Neal	64	Primary School Teacher	QLD	Episode 4
Hamidah	60	Disability Support Worker	NSW	Episode 3
Linda	61	Stylist	QLD	Episode 2
Nicolette	55	Singer	NSW	Episode 2
Angela	52	Psychotherapist	VIC	Episode 1
Jane	60	Interior Designer	NSW	Episode 1
Shana	60	Retired (Education Sales Executive)	NSW	Episode 1

== Call-out order ==
#	Bachelorettes	Episode								
#	Bachelorettes	1	2	3	4	5	6	7	8	9
1	Janette	Jan	Janette	Gera	Terri	Sunny	Kim	Sunny	Sunny	Sunny
2	Shamse	Kim	Shamse	Bianca	Sunny	Kim	Sunny	Janette	Janette	Janette
3	Elizete	Sunny	Sunny	Kim	Kim	Janette	Janette	Kim	Kim	
4	Terri	Janette	Gera	Elizete	Janette	Lauren	Gera	Gera; Jan		
5	Angela	Pip	Catherine	Lauren	Bianca	Catherine	Jan	Gera; Jan		
6	Linda	Terri	Kim	Terri	Elizete	Jan	Catherine; Lauren			
7	Katrina	Shamse	Pip	Sunny	Gera	Gera	Catherine; Lauren			
8	Hamidah	Elizete	Terri	Jan	Pip	Terri				
9	Pip	Katrina	Laura	Catherine	Shamse	Bianca; Elizete; Pip; Shamse				
10	Bianca	Catherine	Jan	Janette	Catherine	Bianca; Elizete; Pip; Shamse				
11	Sunny	Lauren	Bianca	Shamse	Lauren	Bianca; Elizete; Pip; Shamse				
12	Lauren	Laura	Elizete	Pip	Jan	Bianca; Elizete; Pip; Shamse				
13	Catherine	Hamidah	Katrina	Laura	Katrina; Laura					
14	Jane	Nicolette	Hamidah	Katrina	Katrina; Laura					
15	Laura	Linda	Lauren	Hamidah						
16	Shana	Gera	Linda; Nicolette							
17	Nicolette	Bianca	Linda; Nicolette							
18	Gera	Angela; Jane; Shana								
19	Jan	Angela; Jane; Shana								
20	Kim	Angela; Jane; Shana								

The contestant received a first impression rose.
The contestant received a rose during a date
The contestant received a rose during one-on-one time.
The contestant received a rose outside the rose ceremony
The contestant was eliminated on a date.
The contestant was eliminated.
The contestant was eliminated outside the rose ceremony.
The contestant quit the competition.
The contestant won the competition.

== Episodes ==
=== Episode 1 ===
Original airdate: 20 October 2025

Event	Description
First Impression Rose	Jan
Rose Ceremony	Jane, Shana and Angela were eliminated

=== Episode 2 ===
Original airdate: 21 October 2025

Event	Description
Single Date	Janette
Group Date	Elizete, Katrina, Nicolette, Shamse, Sunny, Jan, Hamidah, Gera, Catherine
Rose Ceremony	Linda and Nicolette were eliminated

=== Episode 3 ===
Original airdate: 27 October 2025

Event	Description
Single Date	Gera
Group Date	Terri, Laura, Katrina, Bianca, Lauren, Kim
One-on-one Time	Bianca
Rose Ceremony	Hamidah was eliminated

=== Episode 4 ===
Original airdate: 28 October 2025

Event	Description
Single Date	Terri
Rose Ceremony	Katrina and Laura were eliminated

=== Episode 5 ===
Original airdate: 2 November 2025

Event	Description
Single Date	Sunny
Group Date	Everyone
Rose Ceremony	Terri declined rose; quit Bianca, Elizete, Pip, Shamse were eliminated

=== Episode 6 ===
Original airdate: 3 November 2025

Event	Description
Single Date	Kim
Group Date	Everyone
Rose Ceremony	Catherine & Lauren were eliminated

=== Episode 7 ===
Original airdate: 9 November 2025

Event	Description
Single Date	Janette
Group Date	Everyone
One-on-one time	Jan
Rose Ceremony	Gera & Jan were eliminated

=== Episode 8 ===
Original airdate: 10 November 2025

Event	Description
First Hometown	Sunny - Sydney, New South Wales
Second Hometown	Kim - Brisbane, Queensland
Third Hometown	Janette - Melbourne, Victoria
Rose Ceremony	Kim was eliminated

=== Episode 9 ===
Original airdate: 16 November 2025
Location: Cape Town, South Africa

Event	Description
Meet Bear’s family #1	Janette
Meet Bear’s family #2	Sunny
First final date	Janette
Second final date	Sunny
Final Decision:	Sunny is the winner

== Ratings ==
No.	Title	Air date	Timeslot	Overnight ratings		Ref(s)
No.	Title	Air date	Timeslot	Viewers	Rank	Ref(s)
1	First Impressions	20 October 2025	Monday 7:30 pm	749,000	3	
2	First Dates	21 October 2025	Tuesday 7:30 pm	700,000	5	
3	Puppy Love & Horsing Around	27 October 2025	Monday 7:30 pm	643,000	5	
4	The Way We Were	28 October 2025	Tuesday 7:30 pm	612,000	4	
5	Golden Nomads; Camping Trip/ Heartbreak Sunday	2 November 2025	Sunday 7:00 pm	689,000	3	
6	Home Is Where The Heart Is	3 November 2025	Monday 7:30 pm	725,000	4	
7	Looking Forward	9 November 2025	Sunday 7:00 pm	708,000	4	
8	Hometowns	10 November 2025	Monday 7:30 pm	708,000	4	
9	The Final Decision	16 November 2025	Sunday 7:00 pm	836,000	3	

== Reception ==
=== Accolades ===
The series was nominated for the "Best Structured Reality Program" Logie award in 2026.
