= Sharyn Ghidella =

Australian journalist and news presenter

- Born: 4 December 1966 (age 59); Babinda, Queensland, Australia
- Occupations: News presenter & journalist
- Employer: Network 10
- Children: 2
- Website: Sharyn Ghidella profile (archived via the Wayback Machine on 9 September 2018)

Sharyn Ghidella (born 4 December 1966) is an Australian journalist and news presenter.

== Career ==
Ghidella's career in television began in the North Queensland region, as a reporter and presenter for North Queensland Television (now 10 QLD) for 3 years. She also produced and presented the regional weekly current affairs program, Newsweek. She moved to Brisbane to work with Network Ten's News division, before going to the Nine Network, in 1992.

=== Nine Network ===
Initially, she was at the Nine Network reporting for National Nine News in Sydney, writing and presenting hourly news breaks. In 1997, she began hosting Nine's Daybreak program, which was renamed National Nine Early News in 1998.

Returning to the early news meant she became a regular substitute host on Today filling in for anchor Tracy Grimshaw or news presenter Ian Ross. When Ross left the show in 2001, she became permanent news presenter, and continued as fill in host for the show.

In February 2005, Leila McKinnon replaced Ghidella on Today. Ghidella moved to co-host National Nine Early News alongside Chris Smith and weather presenter Majella Wiemers; this lasted until July 2005. Ghidella then moved back to her previous position as news presenter on Today while McKinnon moved to host National Nine Morning News.

Ghidella left Today and the Nine Network on 1 December 2006 with sources such as the AAP claiming she was upset as she worked at the network "for so long". Ghidella was replaced by Georgie Gardner.

=== Seven Network ===
In 2007, she replaced Tracey Challenor on Seven News Brisbane as weekend presenter. Her arrival at BTQ, as well as that of former Nine News Queensland weather presenter John Schluter, saw the bulletin overtake the market-leading Nine bulletin for the first time in two decades.

In January 2013, Ghidella began presenting Seven News Brisbane from Sunday to Thursday with Bill McDonald (and later Max Futcher) and was also appointed presenter of Today Tonight Queensland. The show was axed in February 2014.

In July 2024, Ghidella left the Seven Network after 17 years with the network.

=== Return to Network 10 ===
In August 2024, it was announced that Ghidella would return to Network 10 to present a revived local edition of 10 News Queensland from early September, thereby segregating the composite Brisbane and Sydney bulletin that had been presented by Sandra Sully since September 2020.

Ghidella has filled in as a co-host on The Project.

== Personal life ==
Ghidella was born in Babinda, in Far North Queensland.

She had a partner, freelance cameraman Paul Croll, and they have two sons.
