= Steve Titmus =

Australian journalist and news presenter

Steve Titmus is an Australian journalist, and presenter.

Titmus is currently a sports presenter on Seven News Brisbane.

== Media ==
Titmus began his career as a cadet journalist at The Examiner in Launceston, Tasmania where he worked from 1979 until 1984 before moving into television. He was them employed as a journalist at TasTV (now WIN Television) from November 1984 until November 1988.

In late 1988, Titmus moved to Adelaide to take up a role as a sports reporter and presenter at Channel 7 Adelaide where he stayed until November 1991. Following his stint in Adelaide, Titmus returned to Tasmania to be the sports editor and presenter at Southern Cross, eventually moving up to become the main anchor of the news bulletin in 1997. During the time he anchored Southern Cross News, the bulletin recorded ratings success, with Titmus' average audience figures having not been passed since.

In 2002, it was reported that Titmus was let go from Southern Cross News due to his employment with public relations company, Corporate Communications. Southern Cross manager Grant Wilson said Titmus' other job may have brought the credibility and integrity of Southern Cross News into question. Titmus alleged Southern Cross Television had breached his contract, but the matter was eventually settled out of court.

Titmus then moved to WIN Television, working in the advertising division in Launceston. In 2006, Titmus returned to news after he was appointed State News Director of the Tasmanian edition WIN News in Hobart. He announced his resignation a year later, claiming he was tiring of the constant travel between his home in Launceston and the WIN Television studio in Hobart.

After a number of years focusing his public relations work and his political aspirations, Titmus returned to television in 2015 as a producer at 7 News Brisbane after his family relocated to Queensland due to a lack of swimming opportunities in Tasmania for his daughter Ariarne Titmus.

From December 2015 until 2021, Titmus served as a relief co-presenter on Channel 7's regional bulletins, often filling in for Rob Brough, particularly in sub-markets read by co-presenters. He would later be appointed as Seven's Gold Coast News main co-presenter in 2021, replacing long-time journalist Rod Young.

In November 2024, the Seven Network announced that it would be axing Seven Gold Coast News. Titmus was later announced as the replacement for Shane Webcke as sports presenter on Seven News in Brisbane.

Titmus has also produced documentaries on Targa Tasmania and won an MBF Health and Well Being Award for a documentary on the Australian Three Peaks Race.

== Politics ==
In 2009, Titmus gained pre-selection to be the Liberal Party candidate for the Tasmanian seat of Bass in the 2010 Federal Election. Titmus was unsuccessful, beaten by Geoff Lyons who won the seat with a strong 6.2% swing to Labor.

Prior to the election, it was reported that Boral was investigating an internal matter after it was discovered Titmus' wife may have breached the company policy of Boral, where she worked as personal assistant and sales administrator, when she sent out election material using a Boral email address.

== Public Relations ==
Titmus is also strategic corporate communications consultant specialising in stakeholder engagement. He has advised clients from finance, tourism, sport, government, civil construction and not for profits. He has operated his own private business since 1997, been Northern Tasmanian Manager of Tasmania's most successful full service agency Corporate Communications (Tas.) Pty Ltd.

In 2012, Titmus was appointed as communications and media officer for the Devonport City Council.

== Awards ==
During his time reporting on sport in Tasmania, Titmus was awarded Cricket Tasmania's "Journalist of the Year" award on three occasions along with AFL Tasmania's "Electronic Journalist of the Year", also on three occasions.

== Charity ==
Titmus has also been involved in voluntary charity work. He has raised funds for numerous charities including the St Giles Society (a Tasmanian charity supporting children with disabilities) and Camp Quality for more than two decades. He continues to assist St Giles and has been awarded for his contribution.

== Personal life ==
Titmus has a son, Christopher Titmus, from a previous relationship. Titmus is married to Robyn and has two daughters. His elder daughter is four-time Olympic gold medalist swimmer Ariarne Titmus.
