= Tracey Challenor =

Australian journalist

Tracey Chancellor
- Born: 1970 or 1971 (age 54–55)
- Occupation: Media manager
- Employer: Life Education Queensland
- Children: 2

Tracey Challenor (born c. 1970-1971) is an Australian journalist and media consultant and former news presenter/reporter for Seven News in Brisbane from November 1991 until February 2007.

== Career ==
Challenor began her journalism career in 1989 as a cadet reporter with The Redland Times and Bayside Bulletin newspapers.

She studied part-time at the University of Queensland, majoring in journalism and Australian government. In 1991, she landed a job as a reporter with Seven News Brisbane and travelled the State covering numerous rounds including the environment, police, politics, medical news and education. In 1996, Challenor was appointed solo weekend news presenter for Seven News Brisbane, and for many years, combined the presenting role with her weekday reporting role. Challenor held the weekend news position for 12 years and the bulletin consistently ranked in the top 10 most watched programs in Queensland.

In November 2006, it was announced that the Nine Network's Today news presenter Sharyn Ghidella would replace Challenor as the weekend newsreader of the 6pm news in Brisbane. Challenor was then offered the job of Senior Reporter by the Network, but declined the offer and resigned from the Network. She finished with Seven to spend time with her 2 children in February 2007.

She is currently the PR and media manager for children's health promotion charity Life Education Queensland and presents the Life Education Podcast for parents which provides advice from experts on a range of key topics.
