= Melissa Downes =

Australian journalist (born 1973)

- Born: 17 September 1973 (age 53); Brisbane, Queensland
- Education: University of Queensland
- Occupation: News presenter
- Employer: Nine Network
- Television: Nine News
- Spouse: DJ Wendt
- Children: 2

Melissa Downes (born 17 September 1973) is an Australian broadcast journalist. She is currently a presenter of Nine News Queensland.

== Career ==
Downes began her career at the Seven Network in Brisbane as an intern during her final year of university. Following her internship, she was offered a position and took on multiple roles, including reporter, fill-in presenter, and co-host of a live 5:00 p.m. local magazine show. She spent nearly seven years with the network.

In 2001, Downes joined the Nine Network in Brisbane as a reporter, later taking on the role of fill-in weekend news presenter. By 2006, she assumed the position of full-time weekend presenter. During her time at Nine, she also contributed to the local magazine show Saturday Extra and served as a presenter for QTQ-9's Nine Gold Coast News bulletin.

In November 2008, Downes replaced Heather Foord as co-anchor of Nine News Queensland's weeknight bulletin, initially alongside Bruce Paige, and from June 2009, with Andrew Lofthouse. Her appointment coincided with a period of declining ratings for the bulletin, which had lost its dominance in the Brisbane market, finishing behind Seven News Brisbane for the second consecutive year in 2008. Despite these challenges, Nine News Queensland managed to reclaim its lead in subsequent years, winning 21 out of 40 ratings weeks in 2013.

== Personal life ==
=== Early life ===
Born and raised in Brisbane, Downes graduated from Somerville House in 1988. She moved to Sydney to model for two years before returning to Brisbane to complete an Arts Journalism degree at the University of Queensland.

=== Family ===
Downes is married to DJ Wendt, owner of music group The Ten Tenors. The couple have two daughters.

Media offices
Preceded by Jillian Whiting	Nine News Queensland; Weekend presenter 2006 – December 2008	Succeeded by Andrew Lofthouse & Eva Milic
Preceded by Heather Foord	Nine News Queensland; Weeknight presenter with Bruce Paige/Andrew Lofthouse/Joel Dry; January 2009 – present	Succeeded by Incumbent
