= Heather Foord =

Australian journalist (born 1965)

Heather Foord (born 1965) is an Australian television journalist.

Foord was a news presenter for the Nine Network in Brisbane for over 20 years, presenting the weekday edition of Nine News Queensland with Bruce Paige between 1995–2001, and again between 2004–2008. She also presented the weekend news with Mike London between 2001–2004, and then solo between 2009–2011 before retiring from television news in June 2011.

== Early life ==
Foord attended Brisbane State High School for her secondary education. She graduated from the University of Queensland with a degree in journalism.

== Personal life ==
Foord has four girls, India, Grace, Riley and Maya, with her husband Tony.

== Career ==
Following university, Foord worked with Good Morning Australia at Network Ten before joining Nine News as a reporter. She quickly made the transition to news reader, taking a weekend hosting position after 6 months.

For a duration of three weeks in October 2007, Foord also presented the news bulletins for the Nine Network's Today, an additional duty requiring her to fly between Sydney and Brisbane daily.

While her daughters were young, Heather returned to the weekend news desk so she could spend more time with her family, but returned to the main desk in 2004 – a position she held until December 2008, when Foord announced her resignation from the news desk after 21 years. Melissa Downes was named her successor in 2009, by which point the strong ratings for Nine News Queensland had worn off.

Foord was announced as the host of Nine Network Brisbane's Extra in January 2009 replacing Jillian Whiting. Extra was axed in late June, and Foord moved back to Nine News in July as the weekend presenter. She remained in this role before stepping down permanently in June 2011; she was replaced by Eva Milic.

== Advocacy ==
Foord is an advocate supporting sufferers of cerebral palsy, a condition which affects her nephew.

Media offices
Preceded by unknown Jillian Whiting	Nine News Queensland; Weekend presenter with Mike London (1989, 2002–2003), Dean Felton (1990–1991); 1989 – December 1991; 2002–2004	Succeeded by Kym Carter; Jillian Whiting
Preceded by Robin Parkin; Jillian Whiting	Nine News Queensland; Weeknight presenter with Mike London (1992–1995), Bruce Paige (1996–2002, 2004–2008); January 1992 – 2002; 2004 – December 2008	Succeeded by Jillian Whiting; Melissa Downes
Preceded by Andrew Lofthouse and Eva Milic	Nine News Queensland; Weekend presenter July 2009 – July 2011	Succeeded by Eva Milic
