= Eva Milic =

Australian journalist (born 1978)

Eva Milic (born 27 June 1978) is an Australian journalist and beauty pageant titleholder who represented Australia at Miss World 2001. Milic is currently the presenter of Nine Gold Coast News.

== Career ==
Milic completed a Bachelor of Business degree in 2001 after graduating from St Michael's College on the Gold Coast. After graduating she launched herself into modelling and she was crowned Miss World Australia 2001 and represented Australia at Miss World 2001 contest.

Milic graduated from Griffith University with a Master of Journalism and Mass Communication degree in 2005 and received awards in academic excellence. It was during her university studies in January 2004 that Milic was offered a freelance position with Nine Gold Coast News, replacing Natalie Gruzlewski as the program's full-time weather presenter in January 2006. Alongside her weather presenting commitments, Milic was also a reporter for Nine Gold Coast News.

In January 2009, Milic replaced Melissa Downes as the weekend presenter of Nine News Queensland, co-hosting with Andrew Lofthouse. Eva was also a regular fill in presenter for Nine News Queensland on weeknights filling in for presenter Melissa Downes.

In July 2009, she was replaced as weekend presenter by Heather Foord, who moved back to the newsdesk following the axing of Extra. Milic moved to presenting the weather on the weekend bulletin until she resigned from the role, being replaced by Paul Burt and Sylvia Jeffreys. In 2011, Eva returned to presenting Nine News Queensland on weekends, replacing Foord who left the network altogether.

In October 2014, Milic was appointed Nine Morning News Queensland and Nine Afternoon News Queensland (later Nine Live Queensland) presenter. She presented both bulletins between Mondays and Thursdays inclusive, with the former bulletin axed without notice in mid-2017. Alison Ariotti replaced her as weekend presenter.

In January 2018, Milic scaled back her duties at Nine Network Brisbane to present only the Monday to Wednesday editions of Nine Live Queensland.

On 24 September 2018, She swapped roles with Wendy Kingston to co-host Nine Gold Coast News with Bruce Paige while Wendy will present Nine Live Queensland from Monday to Wednesday.

She has also been a fill in presenter for Wendy Kingston on Nine News Now.

Apart from her profession as a journalist, she has a keen interest in property and renovating houses in the Brisbane and Gold Coast areas.

Media offices
Preceded by Heather Foord	Nine News Queensland; Weekend presenter 2 July 2011 – 5 October 2014	Succeeded by Darren Curtis and Alison Ariotti
Preceded by Bulletin introduced	Nine Morning News: Queensland Edition; Monday to Thursday presenter 6 October 2014 – 2 October 2017	Succeeded by Bulletin discontinued
Preceded by Bulletin introduced	Nine Live Queensland; Monday to Wednesday presenter 6 October 2014 – 21 September 2018	Succeeded by Wendy Kingston
