= John Schluter =

Australian journalist and weather presenter

John Schluter (born 1952 or 1953) is an Australian journalist and weather presenter.

Schluter currently presents a weekly "Flashback" report and is a fill-in weather presenter on Seven News in Brisbane.

== Career ==
=== Nine Network ===
Schluter presented the weather on National Nine News in Brisbane for nearly 25 years; he ended his affiliation with the Nine Network in September 2006. In the late 1980s, Schluter did voice-over work for Brisbane Ten (TVQ-0/10) but returned to Nine. He was subsequently replaced by weekend weather presenter Joseph May.

=== Seven Network ===
Schluter was later signed by Seven News Brisbane as a fill-in weather presenter for Talitha Cummins, a position that was later made permanent following high ratings for the then-third rate Seven bulletin. His tenure at Seven News coincided with the bulletin overtaking Nine News, where he formerly worked, in the Brisbane television ratings battle; Seven continued to lead in the Brisbane market until it was again overtaken by Nine News in 2013.

In November 2013, Schluter retired as a weather presenter and was replaced by Paul Burt and Tony Auden. He continues to host a weekly Flashback item and act as a fill-in weather presenter on Seven News.

== Personal life ==
Schluter was educated at the Anglican Church Grammar School.

He is married to former Brisbane television identity, Chris Collins, who presented news on Brisbane's Ten News with Rob Readings from 1987 to 1989. He also has a son.
