= Hello World =

Hello, world is a prototypical computer program used as an example or test.

Hello World may also refer to:

== Photographs ==
- Hello, World (photograph), photograph from the 2026 Artemis II mission

== Music ==
- "Hello World!" (composition), a song by the Iamus computer
- "Hello World" (Tremeloes song), 1969
- "Hello World" (Lady Antebellum song), 2010
- "Hello World", a song by Nik Kershaw from the album To Be Frank
- "Hello, World!", a 2015 song by Bump of Chicken
- "Hello World", a 2015 song by Ginny Blackmore
- "Hello World", a song by Belle Perez
- "Hello World", a 2022 song by Alan Walker featuring Torine
- "Hello World", a 2024 song by LiSA
- "Hello World", the theme song of the 2024 Summer Olympics, performed by Gwen Stefani and Anderson Paak

=== Albums ===
- Hello World, a 2011 album by Back-On
- Hello World (Information Society album), 2014
- Hello World (Pinguini Tattici Nucleari album), 2024
- Hello World (Scandal album), 2014
- Hello, World (EP), 2024, by Baekhyun
- Hello, World! (EP), 2022, by Xdinary Heroes
- Hello World: The Motown Solo Collection, a compilation album by Michael Jackson

== Other uses ==
- Helloworld Travel, an Australian-based travel agency
- Helloworld (TV program), an Australian travel and lifestyle show
- Hello World (film), a 2019 Japanese animated science fiction drama
- Hello World (TV series), a 2022 Telugu comedy
- Hello World: How to Be Human in the Age of the Machine, a book by Hannah Fry

== See also ==
- "Hello Earth", a track from Kate Bush's 1985 album Hounds of Love
