= Steven Jacobs (television presenter) =

Australian actor

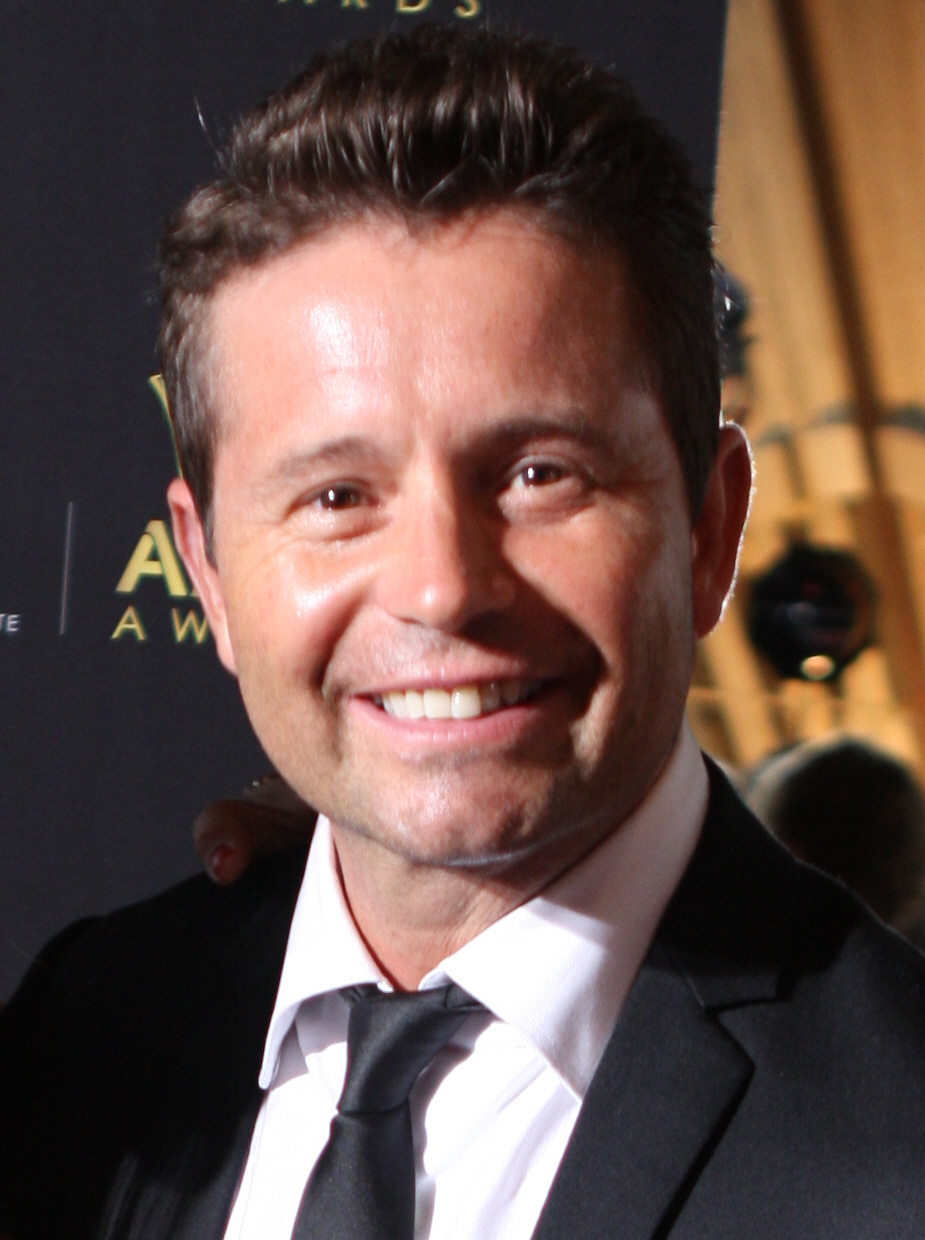
- Jacobs at the AACTA Awards in 2012
- Born: 8 January 1967 (age 59); Wollongong, New South Wales, Australia
- Occupations: Actor; comedian; presenter; writer
- Years active: 1990–present
- Spouse: Rose Jacobs (m. 2010; div. 2018)
- Children: 2

Steven Jacobs (born 8 January 1967) is an Australian actor, comedian, TV and radio presenter and writer.

Jacobs is best known as weather presenter on the Nine Network's breakfast program Today and Weekend Today and has previously been a radio presenter with Nine Radio.

== Career ==
Jacobs was born in Wollongong, New South Wales, the son of Dutch immigrant parents. Before he made it to national television, he hosted a children's news program known as Kids News, which was produced at WIN Television studios in Wollongong.

Following this, Jacobs started his career in radio, presenting a weekly Top 40 music countdown. He has since appeared in many Nine Network productions, the first notable one being All Together Now, which aired from 1991 to 1993. In 1992, he co-hosted the short-lived Saturday morning program Saturday At Rick's. With Sofie Formica, Jacobs co-hosted the series Just Kidding and What's Up Doc? in the early 1990s.

Jacobs worked as a comedy writer for the reincarnation of In Melbourne Tonight variety show and also featured prominently as a performer in this show.

Jacobs became the on-location weather presenter for Today in January 2005, when he took over from Sami Lukis.

In April 2008, along with his Today weather commitments, Jacobs hosted the Australian version of US game show Power of 10. The show was subsequently axed after airing only two episodes. In April and August 2009, Jacobs presented weather on Nine News Melbourne in place of Livinia Nixon.

Jacobs has filled in on Kerri-Anne while Kerri-Anne Kennerley was away. In December 2016, Jacobs announced that he would leave Today to spend more time with his family.

In 2017, he swapped places with Natalia Cooper and became the weather presenter on Weekend Today.

In August 2018, Jacobs returned to Today to fill in for Natalia Cooper while she was away on holidays. It was announced at this time that Jacobs would be a presenter on the Nine Network's new travel series Helloworld for its first season, which aired on 7 October 2018 with Jacobs hosting in Vanuatu. But he, Denis Walter, Sonia Kruger and Lauren Phillips were replaced by Giaan Rooney on the Seven Network.

In January 2019, it was announced that Jacobs would return to Today as weather presenter. Jacobs again departed the show in December, replaced by Tim Davies.

In April 2020, Nine Radio announced Jacobs would present a new breakfast radio program on 2UE, 4BH, 6GT and Magic 1278 from 27 April. He remained host until January 2022.

In September 2024, Jacobs joined Sky News Weather as a presenter.

== Personal life ==
In February 2009, Jacobs announced his engagement to Rose Kelly, a presenter on The Weather Channel, once his divorce was finalised with previous wife of nine years, Alison; they married in Bali in May 2010. In November 2010, he announced on Today that Rose was pregnant with their first child and in May 2011, she gave birth to daughter. In April 2013, Rose gave birth to the couple's second daughter.

In March 2018, Jacobs said that he and Rose had split after seven years of marriage. Jacobs returned to Australia following the split, after living in Vanuatu for the previous year.
