= Download (game show) =

- Genre: Game show
- Presented by: Scott McRae (2000–2001); Nathan Lloyd (2001–2002); Emily Jade O'Keefe (2002)
- Narrated by: Bianca Dye (2000–2002); Miss Bytes (2002)
- Country of origin: Australia
- Original language: English
- No. of seasons: 4
- No. of episodes: 257

Production
- Executive producer: Bill Davidson
- Producer: Tony Ryan
- Production locations: Brisbane, Queensland
- Running time: 21 minutes
- Production company: Becker Entertainment

Original release
- Network: Nine Network
- Release: 14 February 2000 – 2002

Related
- Now You See It

Download is an Australian children's game show which aired on the Nine Network from 2000 until 2002. Scott McRae hosted the first two seasons of the show in 2000–2001; he was replaced by Nathan Lloyd for the third season in 2001–2002, while Emily Jade O'Keefe hosted the fourth season of the show (which aired in mid-2002). The co-host for the fourth season was Miss Bytes (shown on TV in the studio).

== Format ==
Four contestants competed in a tournament format, which consists of a series of word puzzles.

=== First two rounds (Small Screen Game) ===
At the beginning of each round, two contestants were introduced. The winner of the coin toss prior to the beginning of the round got to choose a category; the categories used for this round were as follows: Screen Dreams, Planet Earth, Sounds, True Blue, Techno, and Sweating It Out. The first letter in the word puzzle was automatically given. In order for a letter to be downloaded, a contestant had to answer a trivia question related to the category (the answer always contained the letter that was in the puzzle). The first contestant to buzz in with the correct answer earned 1 point and had that letter automatically placed into the correct position in the puzzle. Solving the puzzle earned the contestant an additional 4 points and eliminated the category from further play. Giving an incorrect answer to the trivia question or solving the puzzle incorrectly yielded no points. The first contestant to score 10 or more points (or the contestant in the lead when time was called, whichever came first) advanced to the third round, while the other contestant left the game with consolation prizes. This round was played twice throughout the game.

=== Third round (Big Screen Game) ===
The two remaining contestants who won the first two rounds faced off against each other in this round, and their scores were reset to zero. Both contestants were shown a scrambled word or phrase and were given a maximum of five clues to try and unscramble it; the first contestant to buzz in with the correct word was awarded a number of points depending upon the number of clues given (the maximum score was five points, with one point being deducted for each additional clue). Every time a clue is read out, some of the letters in the word were unscrambled; if no one was able to unscramble the word in five clues, the word was thrown out and no points were awarded to either team.

Once time was called, the contestants played a 60-second lightning round, where the point values for each unscrambled word were doubled (the maximum point value was 10 points). The player with the most points at the end of the round won the game and advanced to the bonus round. If both contestants were tied at the end of the round, one final puzzle was played. The player who buzzed in with the correct answer won the game, but an incorrect answer or no response awarded the win to the other contestant.

The highest margin of victory was 90 points (a score of 94–4), which was recorded in October 2002 by Kavel Gounden (who was 11 years old at the time and represented Kenmore South State School).

=== Endgame ===
The contestant who won the game had a chance to win additional prizes. During the first two seasons, the player had to choose one category before the beginning of the round; this was dropped for the show's third and fourth seasons. There was a puzzle with four lines: a series of nine letters were blindly chosen by the contestant, and they were placed in the correct positions in the puzzle. Once the positions were filled, the contestant was given 40 seconds to solve all four puzzles (there was one clue for each puzzle). The contestant received a prize for every correct answer; in order for a correct answer to be credited, the line number (or the line letter in the third and fourth seasons) had to be given before the word. Only one puzzle can be solved at a time; if a contestant was unsure, he or she could pass and return to a given clue depending upon the amount of time left in the round. If the contestant solved all four puzzles correctly, he or she won all four prizes. If not, then he or she will keep the prizes that they did win.
