= Sonia Kruger =

Australian television presenter (born 1965)

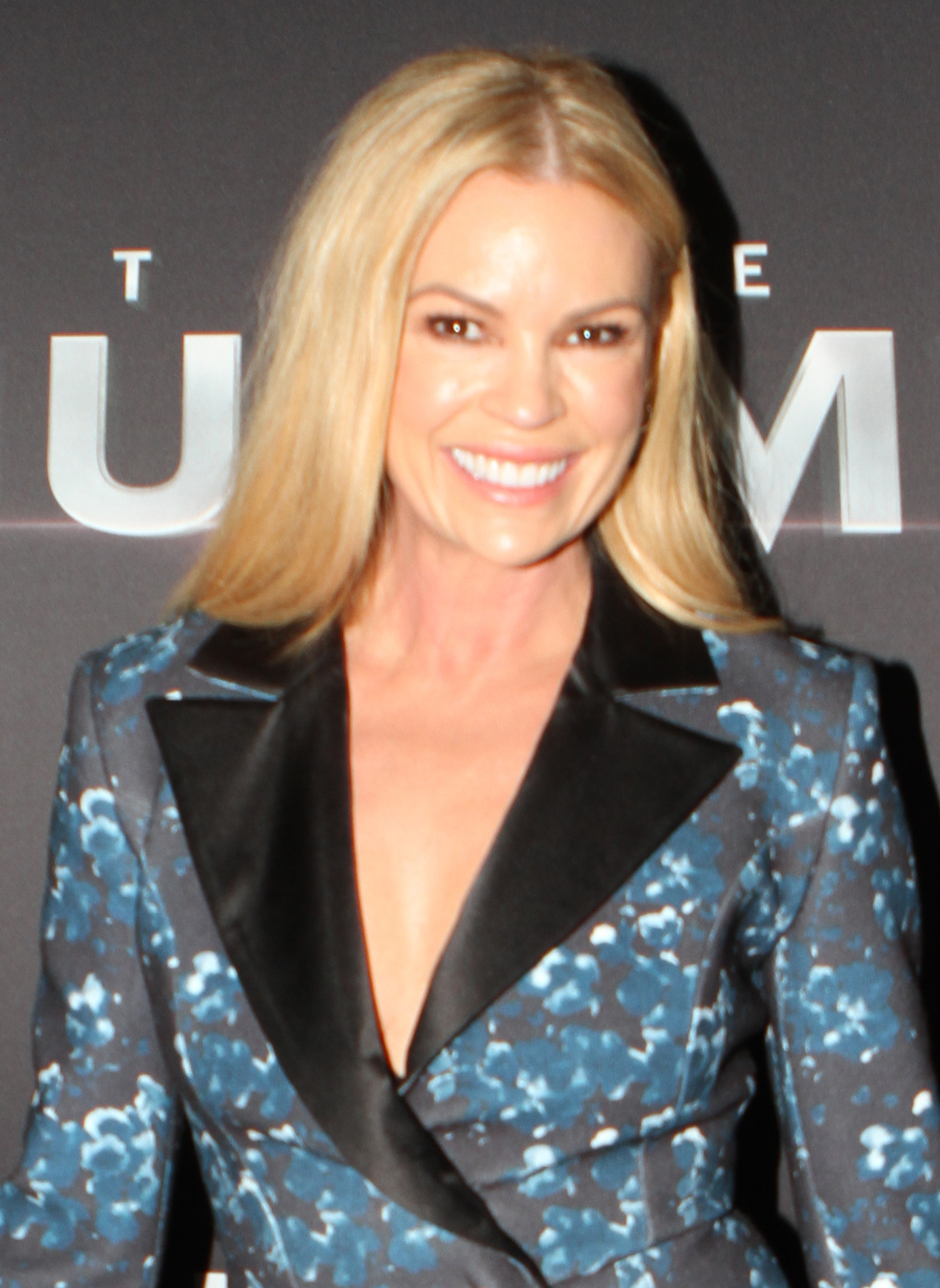
- Kruger at The Mummy black carpet in 2017
- Born: Sonia Melissa Kruger; 28 August 1965 (age 61); Toowoomba, Queensland, Australia
- Education: University of Technology
- Occupations: Television presenter; actress; media personality
- Years active: 1988–present
- Employer: Seven Network
- Notable work: Host of Dancing with the Stars with co-host Chris Brown, Today Extra presenter with David Campbell; Host of Big Brother Australia; Presenter of the 2020 Olympics; Host of Holey Moley
- Spouse: James Davies (m. 2002; div. 2008)
- Partner: Craig McPherson
- Children: 1

Sonia Melissa Kruger (born 28 August 1965) is an Australian television presenter, actress and media personality. She is best known for co-hosting the Australian version of Dancing with the Stars alongside Chris Brown, and for the role of Tina Sparkle in the 1992 film Strictly Ballroom. Kruger was also the host of Big Brother Australia from 2012 to 2014 on Nine and later returned as host during its revival on Channel 7, from 2020 to 2023.

During her time at the Seven Network, Kruger has reported for numerous other events, including the network's coverage of the Olympics, the Melbourne Cup and the Australian Open. In 2023, she was awarded the Gold Logie Award for Most Popular Personality on Australian Television.

She has attracted criticism for her comments on immigrants and Muslims.

== Early life ==
Kruger was born in Toowoomba, Queensland, on 28 August 1965. She was raised in the south-east Queensland suburb of Waterford on the Gold Coast-Logan border and often spent weekends travelling to Gold Coast beaches in Burleigh Heads and Surfers Paradise when not competing in dance competitions. She completed her secondary education at Beenleigh State High School and graduated Year 12 in 1982. Following graduation, she moved to Sydney to complete an Arts Degree at the University of Technology, Sydney and taught dance at the National Institute of Dramatic Art (NIDA).

== Career ==
In 1992, Kruger came to prominence in her acting debut as Tina Sparkle in the AFI Award-winning film Strictly Ballroom. She was also a ballroom adviser for the film. This remains her only acting role to date.

Following her film debut she hosted the children's variety show Wonder World! on the Nine Network.

Kruger has been an entertainment reporter for Seven Network shows Today Tonight, Sunrise and 11AM. She previously hosted the morning program on the Sydney-based radio station Mix 106.5 with Dancing with the Stars judges Todd McKenney and Andy Grace.

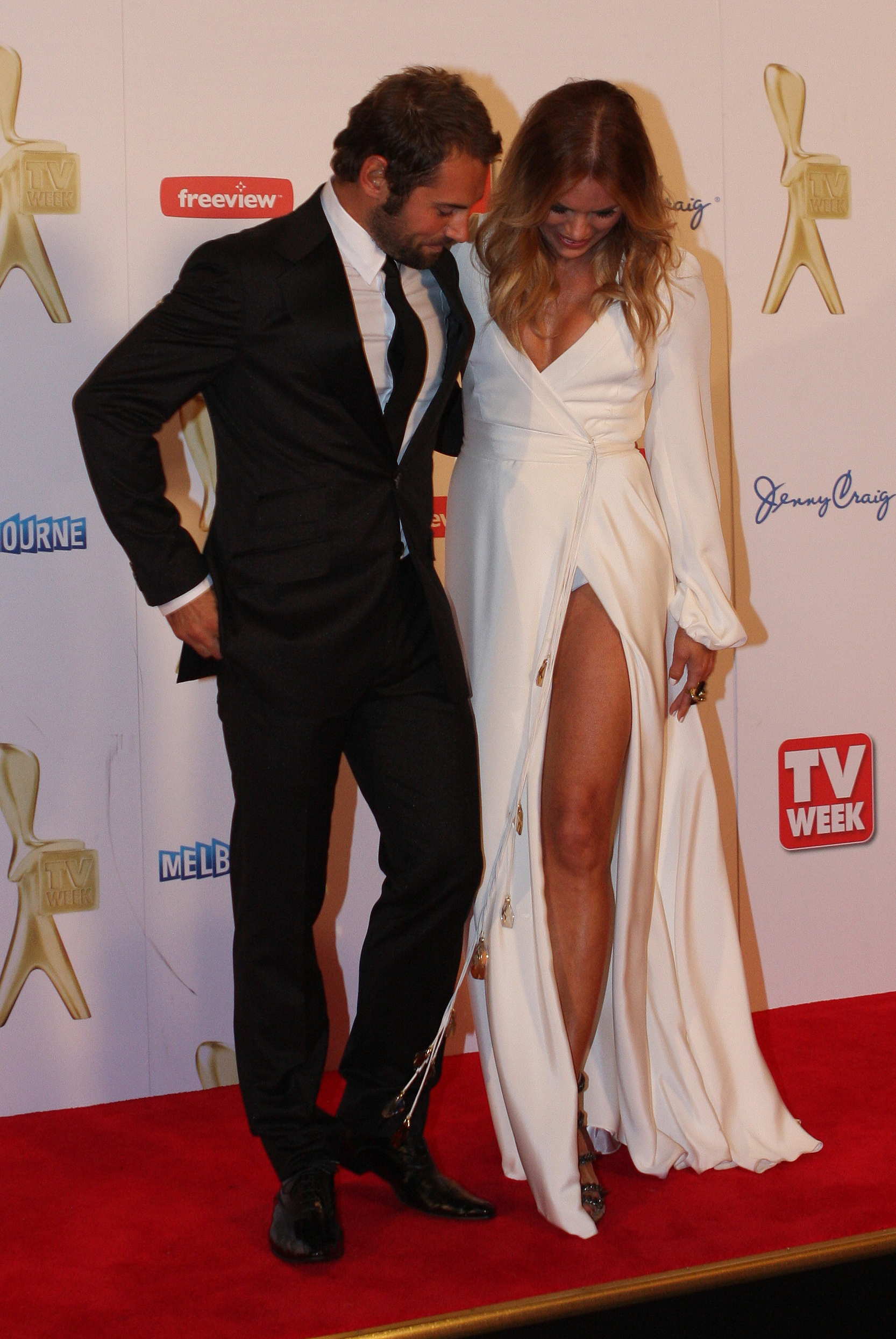
Kruger (right) with Daniel MacPherson at the 2011 Logie Awards in Melbourne

In 2004, Kruger joined the Seven Network reality dance competition series Dancing with the Stars, the Australian version of the UK BBC television series Strictly Come Dancing. She co-hosted the series with both Daryl Somers and Daniel MacPherson over the course of the eleven seasons in which she appeared. In September 2008, Kruger was confirmed to host the Seven Network makeover reality show 10 Years Younger in 10 Days. Despite high ratings for its series premiere, Seven Network did not renew the series for a second season.

In November 2011, Kruger announced she was leaving both Dancing with the Stars and the Seven Network to pursue other opportunities.

Kruger then signed a development deal with the Nine Network in November 2011. She was confirmed to host her own daytime talk show, Mornings, with singer and actor David Campbell. The series was designed to replace Kerri-Anne, which ended that same month. The series premiered on 6 February 2012 and continued into 2016 rebranded as Today Extra.

Kruger was announced to host the Nine Network's reboot of the competition reality series Big Brother Australia. Kruger replaced Kyle Sandilands and Jackie O, who hosted the series on Network Ten in its eighth season, after which the show was cancelled in 2008. Big Brother 9 premiered on 13 August 2012 to 1.6 million viewers, the franchise's highest ratings since the series' third season.

On 22 February 2015, it was announced that Kruger would be joining the fourth series of The Voice Australia as a co-host with Darren McMullen.

In November 2017, Kruger was announced as a co-host of Vision Australia's Carols by Candlelight alongside David Campbell. She replaced Lisa Wilkinson who had resigned from the Nine Network. Kruger was replaced by Allison Langdon after defecting to the Seven Network.

In August 2018, Kruger was announced as a presenter on the Nine Network new travel series, Helloworld, which aired on 7 October 2018. But she, Lauren Phillips, Denis Walter and Steven Jacobs were replaced by Giaan Rooney as a presenter, on the Seven Network.

In November 2019, Kruger announced her resignation from the Nine Network. She hosted Today Extra for the last time on Friday, 15 November. Seven Network CEO James Warburton confirmed her joining the network and announced that her roles would include hosting their upcoming reality show Mega Mini Golf.

In February 2020, the Seven Network announced that Kruger would host a revival of Big Brother, but due to filming commitments would no longer be hosting the upcoming series Holey Moley. However, in October 2020, Kruger was confirmed as the host of the show.

In 2021, Kruger again hosted The Voice after Seven picked up the rights to the franchise following the Nine Network's failure to renew its contract with the show. Kruger is the current co-host of Channel Seven's Dancing with the Stars, starring alongside her original co-host Daryl Somers.

Kruger was nominated for the Bert Newton Award for Most Popular Presenter at the Logie Awards in 2022, 2023, and 2024. She was first nominated for the Gold Logie Award for Most Popular Personality on Australian Television in 2022, and won the award in 2023, before a further nomination in 2024. Kruger won the "Most Overexposed Performer" award at the TV Tonight Awards for four consecutive years from 2021 to 2024. She was nominated for the Gold Logie in 2025.

== Personal life ==
Kruger was married for six years (2002 to 2008) to James Davie, a British-born banker.

After the marriage ended in September 2008, she began seeing her current partner, Craig McPherson, executive producer of Today Tonight. She and McPherson had been trying for a child for years, through both IVF and natural methods. She became pregnant several times, but they ended in miscarriages. In August 2014, she announced she was pregnant, having conceived via in-vitro fertilisation (IVF) using a donor egg. In 2015, Kruger gave birth to a daughter.

== Controversies ==
In 2008, during an episode of Dancing with the Stars, Kruger made a comment about a "sweat shop of illegal immigrants" working on her wardrobe for the Melbourne Cup carnival before referring to Chong Lim, the show's Malaysian-born musical director, with the words "How's the family, Chong? All right?" Channel Seven later issued an apology for her statement.

On 18 July 2016, during an appearance on the morning show Today, Kruger called for a complete ban on Muslims entering Australia, in agreement with an opinion piece by commentator Andrew Bolt. Kruger defended her comments, saying: "I believe it's vital in a democratic society to be able to discuss these issues without being labelled racist." The firebombing of a Perth radio station initially linked by media reports to the presenters disagreeing with Kruger's views was later determined by police to be coincidental and to have "nothing to do with the Islam discussion".

A racial vilification complaint against Kruger was made to the Civil and Administrative Tribunal over her statement about Muslim immigration. The Nine Network applied to have the complaint dismissed without a hearing, but this was refused. The complaint was made by Sam Ekermawi, who was described by The Daily Telegraph as a "serial offence-taker". The tribunal heard that Ekermawi had been involved in thirty-two hearings before courts and tribunals. The matter proceeded for directions in June 2018. The Tribunal found that she had vilified Muslims in her comments, but that this was not racial vilification because Muslims are not a race.

== Accolades ==
Year	Award	Category	Nominee(s)	Result	Ref.
2021	TV Tonight Awards: Worst of 2020	Most Overexposed Personality	Sonia Kruger	Won	
2022	TV Tonight Awards: Worst of 2021	Most Overexposed Performer	Sonia Kruger	Won	
2023	TV Tonight Awards: Worst of 2022	Most Overexposed Performer	Sonia Kruger	Won	
2024	TV Tonight Awards: Worst of 2023	Most Overexposed	Sonia Kruger	Won	
2025	TV Tonight Awards: Worst of 2024	Most Overexposed	Sonia Kruger	Won	
2026	TV Tonight Awards: Worst of 2025	Most Overexposed Performer	Sonia Kruger	Won	
2022	Logie Awards	Gold Logie Award for Most Popular Personality on Australian Television	Sonia Kruger for Big Brother, Holey Moley, Dancing with The Stars: All Stars, The Voice and The Voice: Generations	Nominated	
2022	Logie Awards	Bert Newton Award for Most Popular Presenter	Sonia Kruger for Big Brother, Holey Moley, Dancing with The Stars: All Stars, The Voice and The Voice: Generations	Nominated	
2023	Logie Awards	Gold Logie Award for Most Popular Personality on Australian Television	Sonia Kruger for Big Brother, Dancing with The Stars, and The Voice	Won	
2023	Logie Awards	Bert Newton Award for Most Popular Presenter	Sonia Kruger for Big Brother, Dancing with The Stars, and The Voice	Nominated	
2024	Logie Awards	Gold Logie Award for Most Popular Personality on Australian Television	Sonia Kruger for Big Brother, Dancing with The Stars, and The Voice	Nominated	
2024	Logie Awards	Bert Newton Award for Most Popular Presenter	Sonia Kruger for Big Brother, Dancing with The Stars, and The Voice	Nominated	
2025	Logie Awards	TV Week Gold Logie – Most Popular Personality on Australian Television	Sonia Kruger for The Voice, Dancing With The Stars, Logies Red Carpet Show, Seven Network	Nominated	
