= Kimberley Davies =

Australian actress and model (born 1973)

- Born: 20 February 1973 (age 53); Ballarat, Victoria, Australia
- Other name: Kimberly Davies
- Education: University of Melbourne (commerce); Monash University (drama); RMIT University (interior design)
- Occupations: Actress; model
- Years active: 1991–present
- Known for: Neighbours; Pacific Palisades
- Spouse: Jason Harvey (m. 1997)
- Children: 3

Kimberley Davies (born 20 February 1973) is an Australian actress and model, known for playing Annalise Hartman on the Australian television soap opera Neighbours from 1993 until 1996.

== Early life ==
Davies was born in Ballarat, where her father worked as a baker. She moved to Melbourne when she was 13 years old. She was spotted by an agent from Chadwick Models while she was holidaying on the Gold Coast. Davies was offered a modelling contract, which she initially turned down. However, after completing a photoshoot for Mode, she signed with Chadwick and stopped her commerce studies at the University of Melbourne.

== Career ==
Davies appeared in print and television campaigns for both national and international brands, including Myer, Mitsubishi and Cadbury.

Davies wanted to be an actress and after securing an acting agent, she received an audition for Neighbours. She was cast as hairdresser Annalise Hartman in 1992 when she was 19 years old. She was known to the cast and crew through her relationship with cast member Scott Michaelson (who played Brad Willis). Davies said she chose to do Neighbours because of its popularity around the world and the chance to gain more experience than modelling could offer. Davies became popular in both Australia and the UK during her time in Neighbours. When she appeared on the cover of Inside Sport, it become the magazine's highest selling issue. Her calendar was the second highest seller for 1996. In the UK, she also had her own clothing collection in Kays Catalogues and appeared in the Goldilocks pantomime.

Davies made a number of cameos in the ABC comedy series Club Buggery. Following her departure from Neighbours in 1996, she played the role of "assassin android" Betty in the Twisted Tales episode "Directly from My Heart to You". She also hosted the Nine Network series Just Kidding, which featured pranks played on an unsuspecting public, and had a small role in the feature film True Love and Chaos. In 1998, Davies was announced as the "new face" of Just Jeans and featured in their "Relax This Summer" advertisement campaign.

Davies later moved to the United States and played the role of Laura Sinclair in the lavish but short-lived night-time soap opera Pacific Palisades. In 2000, she made guest appearances in Ally McBeal and Spin City. She also appeared in a 2004 episode of the sitcom Friends, and appeared in the films Psycho Beach Party, The Next Best Thing, The Shrink Is In, Made and South Pacific. In 2005, she returned to Neighbours for the show's twentieth anniversary.

In May 2005, she appeared on an Australian reality television show called Celebrity Circus and in November 2005 she appeared in the fifth series of UK reality television show I'm a Celebrity... Get Me Out of Here! but left halfway through after she hurt her shoulder, during one of the "Bush Tucker Trials". In 2007, Davies was a contestant on Australia's Dancing with the Stars and in the summer of that year she appeared in a Daz advert in the UK.

Davies voices Australian character Alura McCall in the 2002 videogame James Bond 007: Nightfire. In September 2010, she appeared in an episode of Australian comedy game show Talkin' 'Bout Your Generation. She also guested in the second season of comedy series Lowdown in 2012.

On 20 June 2025, it was announced that Davies would be reprising her role as Annalise in Neighbours twenty years after her last appearance.

== Personal life ==
Davies has been married to model-turned-orthopaedic surgeon Jason Harvey since 1997. They have three children and live in Melbourne, where Davies owns a decorating business.

Davies studied drama at Monash University and has trained with acting coaches Janet Alhunty, Ivana Chubbuck and Lesly Kahn. She also studied interior design at RMIT University (RMIT).

== Filmography ==
=== Film ===
Year	Title	Role	Notes
1997	True Love and Chaos	Ariel	
1999	Storm Catcher	Agent Lock	
2000	Psycho Beach Party	Bettina Barnes	
2000	The Next Best Thing	Hostess	
2001	Made	Bartender	
2001	Feather Pimento	Mrs Zilinski	Short film
2002	The Month of August	Kelly	
2005	Death to the Supermodels	Darbie	Direct to video film
2007	Balkanski Sindrom	Anna	

=== Television ===
Year	Title	Role	Notes
1993–1996; 2005; 2025	Neighbours	Annalise Hartman	Series regular
1996	Twisted Tales	Betty	Episode: "Directly from My Heart to You"
1997	Pacific Palisades	Laura Sinclair	Series regular
1998	Viper	Trudy	Episode: "The Return"
1998	It's True!	Maya	Episode: "The Rats of Rumfordton"
1999	Silk Stalkings	Rhonna Sendahl	Episode: "Killer App"
1999	Close Contact	Cheryl McManus	TV film
1999	Early Edition	Amber Lamonte	Episode: "The Iceman Taketh"
2000	Ally McBeal	Angela Prune	Episode 16: "Boy Next Door"
2000	Early Edition	Jade	Episode: "Occasionally Amber"
2000	Profiler	Jennifer Hutton	Episodes: "On Your Marks", "Tsuris"
2000	Spin City	Inga	Episode: "Hello Charlie"
2000	The Magicians	Regina	TV film
2001	The Shrink Is In	Isabelle	TV film
2001	South Pacific	Luann	TV film
2001	The Invisible Man	Elaine Lowe	Episode: "A Sense of Community"
2002	Seconds to Spare	Rhonda Newcombe	TV film
2004	Friends	Adrienne Turner	Episode: "The One Where the Stripper Cries"
2006	City Homicide		Unaired pilot
2010	Sleuth 101	Rachel Timms	Episode: "Late and Live"
2011	SLiDE	Grace	Season 1, episode 2
2012	Lowdown	Imogen McMahon	Episode: "The Naked Chef"

=== Video games ===
Year	Title	Role	Notes
2002	James Bond 007: Nightfire	Alura McCall	

=== Stage ===
Year	Title	Role	Notes
1995	Goldilocks		UK pantomime

=== TVC ===
Year	Title	Role	Notes	Ref.
	Myer		Australian advertisement	
	Mitsubishi		Australian advertisement	
	Cadbury		Australian advertisement	
1996	Arnott’s Tim Tams	Self	Australian TV advertisement	
1998	Just Jeans "Relax This Summer"		Australian TV advertisement	
2001	Smith's Chips	Self (voice)	Australian TV advertisement	
2007	Cleaner Close (Daz detergent)	Shazza	British TV advertisement	
