= Now You See It (American game show) =

- Title Card for the 1989 version
- Genre: Game show
- Created by: Frank Wayne
- Directed by: Paul Alter (1974-75); Marc Breslow; Andrew Felsher (1989)
- Presented by: Jack Narz; Chuck Henry
- Announcer: Johnny Olson; Gene Wood; Mark Driscoll; Don Morrow
- Theme music composer: Quincy Jones; Bill Cosby
- Opening theme: "Chump Change"
- Country of origin: United States
- Original language: English
- No. of episodes: 308 (1974–75 version); 75 (1989 version)

Production
- Executive producers: Frank Wayne (1974-75); Jonathan Goodson (1989)
- Producers: Buck D'Amore (1974-75); Gary Dawson; Andrew Felsher (1989)
- Production locations: CBS Television City; Los Angeles, California
- Running time: approx. 22–26 minutes
- Production companies: Mark Goodson-Bill Todman Productions (1974-1975); Mark Goodson Television Productions (1989)

Original release
- Network: CBS
- Release: April 1, 1974 – June 13, 1975
- Release: April 3 – July 14, 1989

Now You See It is an American television game show created by Frank Wayne for Mark Goodson-Bill Todman Productions. Contestants answered general knowledge trivia questions by finding the answers hidden in a grid, similar to a word search puzzle.

Two seasons were produced, both of which aired on CBS. The first series ran from April 1, 1974, to June 13, 1975, and was hosted by Jack Narz who was also hosting the syndicated revival of Concentration. Johnny Olson was the original announcer, with Gene Wood substituting on occasion. The second series ran from April 3 to July 14, 1989, and was hosted by Los Angeles news anchor Chuck Henry. Los Angeles disc jockey Mark Driscoll announced for the first month of the 1989 season, with Don Morrow replacing him for the remainder of the run.

== Gameplay ==
=== 1974-75 version ===
==== Format #1 ====
An elimination round in progress.

The first round of Now You See It under its original format began with four new contestants split into two teams, each with one "outside" and one "inside" contestant. This round, called the Elimination Game, was played using a board of 56 letters that were arranged in four rows of 14, each row contained a series of overlapping words, read left to right. Rows and columns were numbered for scoring purposes, and were referred to respectively as "lines" and "positions." The board was shown briefly to the four contestants, then turned off before any of them could fully memorize it.

The outside contestants turned their backs to the board as it was turned back on, and Narz asked a toss-up question for the inside contestants. The first one to buzz-in had to give the number of the line containing the correct answer. If he/she was correct, the other three lines were turned off, and the outside teammate turned to face the board and had to give both the answer and the position number of its starting letter. If the wrong line was given, the correct one was turned on and the outside contestant of the opposing team received a free guess at the answer. If an incorrect word was given, Narz gave the correct one and neither team scored. The point value for each correct answer was determined by adding its line and position numbers, for example, a word that started at position 9 in line 2 would be worth 11 points. Inside contestants could buzz-in before the host had finished a question, but in this case the outside contestant had to respond based only on the portion read to that point.

After each question, the entire board was turned on and the outside contestants turned their backs to it again. A total of 12 questions were played, with the members of each team trading places after the first six. The team in the lead at the end of the round advanced to the Semi-Finals, while their opponents were eliminated.

The members of the winning team competed against each other in the Semi-Finals, facing a board with four rows of 16 blanks each. Narz read a crossword-style clue, after which the letters of the answer were filled in one at a time as he said "letter," starting at the far left end of the top row. Either contestant could buzz-in at any time, a correct answer scored one point and completed the word, but a miss gave the opponent a free guess before Narz resumed filling in the letters. If the word was not solved before its last letter was revealed, neither contestant scored. Each word after the first overlapped its predecessor by at least one letter, when the row became too full to accommodate any more words, play continued with a new word on the next row down.

The first player to guess four words won the round and a prize package, in addition to moving on to face the champion in the Finals. During the first two weeks, no prize package was given to the winner. The goal was increased from four words to five during the third week, this would become permanent when the second format was introduced.

The Finals followed the same rules as the Elimination Game, using a new board of 56 letters. A contestant who buzzed-in had to give first the line of the correct answer, then the answer and its position. After 12 questions, the higher-scoring contestant took/retained the championship and advanced to the Solo Game for a chance to win a cash jackpot. During the first episode only, a correct toss-up answer gave that contestant sole control of the round until he/she missed a question. The opponent could then take control by giving the correct answer, if he/she also missed, the next question was played as a toss-up. After the first episode, this format was abandoned and all words were played as toss-ups.

Beginning with the 101st episode and continuing until the adoption of the second main game format, contestants were asked to scan the board and write down one word from the board each at the beginning of each half of the Elimination Game and the Finals. A contestant or team earned a 10-point bonus for correctly answering a question with one of their chosen words, but had to reveal it immediately upon using it in order to score.

==== Format #2 ====
On December 16, 1974, Now You See It underwent a significant change in format.

The game began with two new players playing the Qualifying Round, which was played in the exact same manner as the Semi-Finals prior to the change. Guessing five words first won the round and played against the returning champion in the Championship Round.

The Championship Round was played in the same manner as the Finals in the prior format, and the scoring format was still the same. The difference was that the goal was to reach 100 points first, as opposed to being ahead when the final bell rang. In addition, the values of all words were doubled once either contestant reached 50 points. Whoever reached 100 points first became champion and played the Solo Game for the jackpot. If the champion won the Solo Game, the contestant defeated returned for the next game as champion-designate.

Under this format, a new game began as soon as the previous Solo Game ended. Play continued until time ran out, then resumed on the next episode.

=== 1989 version ===
On October 20, 1988, a pilot was filmed. When Now You See It was picked up in 1989, it kept the basic game format introduced late in the first series' run, with a qualifying round and a championship round. Like it had done with its recent revivals of Blockbusters and Concentration two years earlier, Mark Goodson Productions gave the show a technological upgrade with a computer generated board. The game was conducted on a three-tiered stage, with each round of play conducted on one of the three levels and covered by a large ring covered in chase lighting that was raised when play moved to that level and lowered when the round was over.

Qualifying Round

The qualifying round was played on the first level and, as in the previous qualifying round, two contestants faced off to try to advance to face the day's champion (or champion-designate). The object, still, was to find the words that fit the clues given by the host. Like before, the board consisted of four lines and fourteen letters.

The major difference came in scoring. Neither the lines nor the positions of the letters were numbered. Instead, the value for a correct answer was 100 points and decreased by five points for every third of a second that elapsed before someone buzzed in. The first contestant to buzz in had to give the line containing the answer, and then the word itself, to score. If the counter reached 25 points with no guesses, the contestants would be told what line the word was on to assist them.

The qualifying round consisted of two boards, with the second being played for double points. Originally, the second board was also played for the same number of points, with points doubling if time was running short.

The first person to 1,000 points moved on to face the champion in the next round of play.

Championship Round

In the championship round, the winner of the qualifying round moved up to the second level and faced off against the returning champion, whose nametag had a crown atop of it so the audience knew. The two competed for cash and tried to be the first to reach or surpass $1,000.

The first board was worth $200, increasing by $100 for each one that followed. Every board had six hidden words that fit a specific category and was revealed to the audience and viewers first. After Henry revealed the category for the board in play, a window popped up in front of each contestant so they could see the board.

The first player to find a word fitting the category was given the chance to earn the monetary value of the board. To do so, he/she was shown the board again and given 20 seconds to locate the other five words in the category. Doing so won the board and the monetary value attached was added to their score. If either player failed to come up with the necessary five answers on their turn, the opposing player was given a chance to claim the money. Henry would remind him/her of what answers had already been given, and he/she was shown the board for five seconds to come up with one of the remaining answers, successfully doing so won the value of the board, while failure meant the first contestant claimed the board's value.

The first contestant to reach or pass the $1,000 goal became champion, got to keep their bank, and advanced to the Solo Game.

=== Solo Game (All versions) ===
In the Solo Game, the champion was given one minute to find ten words on a brand new board. The champion viewed the board on a telestrator screen. On the original Now You See It, the Solo Game board had four rows of 16 letters each and the screen was embedded in Jack Narz's desk. The 1989 series positioned the bonus area at center stage, with the podium on the third tier of the set. Inside the podium was the screen to display the computer generated board, which like all of the boards to that point was four rows of fourteen letters each.

After a clue was given, the champion had to find the relevant word, circle it with an electronic pencil, and call it out. If the champion could not immediately locate the word, he/she was permitted to pass; any words that were passed on would be played again after all ten clues had been given. If the champion managed to find all ten words within the time limit, he/she won a cash jackpot. If not, $100 was given to him/her for each word that had been found.

On both series, the Solo Game jackpot started at $5,000. On the 1974 series, the jackpot increased by $1,000 for each time that it was not won, stopping once it reacted CBS' limit of $25,000 on winnings. $5,000 was added on the 1989 series for each unsuccessful attempt, with no cap on how high it could reach.

A champion was allowed to play on the 1974 series until either being defeated in the main game or winning the Solo Game. If the champion retired in the 1974 version, the runner up/second runner up in the main game becomes champion designate on the next show. The 1989 series allowed champions to return until they played the Solo Game five times or reached $75,000 in winnings, which CBS' limit had increased to by that time. If a champion retired in the 1989 version, a random contestant becomes champion designate on the next show.

== Production information ==
=== Theme ===
Both versions used the instrumental theme "Chump Change," composed by Quincy Jones and Bill Cosby. For a brief period, the 1970s version used an alternate theme written by Edd Kalehoff, but returned to "Chump Change" shortly thereafter.

=== Broadcast history ===
==== 1974–1975 ====
The first version ran from April 1, 1974 to June 13, 1975 at 11:00 a.m. (10:00 Central) with Jack Narz hosting, replacing The $10,000 Pyramid, which moved to ABC one month after its CBS cancellation. Initially, it did well against Alex Trebek's American debut on NBC (The Wizard of Odds) but, three months later, NBC gave Trebek a new show called High Rollers at that slot and Now You See It began to struggle while the producers altered the format several times. The show was taped at Television City Studios in Studio 33, the longtime home of The Price Is Right. Some episodes used Studio 41, which at the time was the stage of CBS's Tattletales, another Goodson-Todman show.

NBC's resurgence in its morning lineup in early 1975 with the likes of Wheel of Fortune prompted CBS to clean house, canceling The Joker's Wild along with Now You See It. Gambit (the show actually facing Wheel), which had begun in 1972 at 11/10, returned to that slot after Now You See It's departure from the schedule.

This version aired occasionally on Game Show Network during the 1990s and 2000s until the network chose not to renew its contract with FremantleMedia (which now owns the Goodson-Todman library). The show currently airs as part of Buzzr's weekday morning lineup. (9:30 a.m. EST)

==== 1989 ====
Years after the original Now You See It came to an end, Mark Goodson Productions decided to try the show again once a pilot was done on October 20, 1988. In 1989, CBS again aired the show on daytime, and the new Now You See It debuted on April 3 at 10:30 a.m. (9:30 a.m. Central) in place of Card Sharks, another Mark Goodson show, which had been airing in that timeslot since January 1986. Los Angeles news anchor Chuck Henry, was host, and the show was again taped at Studio 33 inside Television City in Hollywood.

Not only did it face its sister Mark Goodson-packaged game Classic Concentration on NBC, but the new Now You See It faced a vastly changed television market. Syndicated talk shows such as Donahue and Sally Jessy Raphael had become popular and made games like Now You See It seem tame and quaint. Daytime viewership declined since 1975, from a surge in cable and pay channels giving viewers more choices than ever. With greater possibility for local advertising revenue from the talk shows, numerous stations passed despite the solid performance of its lead-in, Family Feud.

Production of the syndicated game show Wheel of Fortune, at that point the biggest ratings winner in syndication, had moved to Studio 33 at Television City for the upcoming seventh season after spending the previous six at NBC Studios in Burbank, California. Meanwhile, NBC had cancelled the daytime edition of Wheel that had aired since 1975 due to a decline in ratings. The final episode aired on June 30, 1989. CBS took advantage of Wheel in its studio space and relaunched the daytime series shortly after the show left Burbank. Now You See It was the only CBS morning show that was not performing well in the ratings, and the network declined to extend their commitment past the original fifteen weeks.

Now You See It came to an end on July 14, 1989 after seventy-five episodes. The show closed with the entire stage crew joining Chuck Henry and the day’s champion to bid farewell. Wheel launched the following Monday and lasted until January 11, 1991 in the time slot before finishing its run on NBC later that year.

== Merchandise ==
=== Home game ===
A board game based on the 1974–1975 version was made by the Milton Bradley Company (referred to simply as Milton Bradley) in 1974.

=== Computer game ===
A computer game based on the 1989 version was made by Gametek in 1990.

== International versions ==
Country	Local name	Host	Network	Year aired
Australia	Now You See It	Mike Meade and Melvin the Robot; Sofie Formica	Seven Network	1985–1990; 1991–1993
Australia	Now You See It	Scott McRae	Nine Network	1998–2000
Indonesia	Temukan Kata	Nico Siahaan; Irgi Ahmad Fahrezi	Kompas TV	2012–2013
United Kingdom; Scotland	Now You See It; Celebrity NYSI; Children's NYSI	Johnny Beattie; Jack McLaughlin; Grant Stott; Fred MacAulay	Scottish Television	1981–1984; 1985–1986; 1993; 1994–1995
