= Geelong Hospital =

- Barwon Health
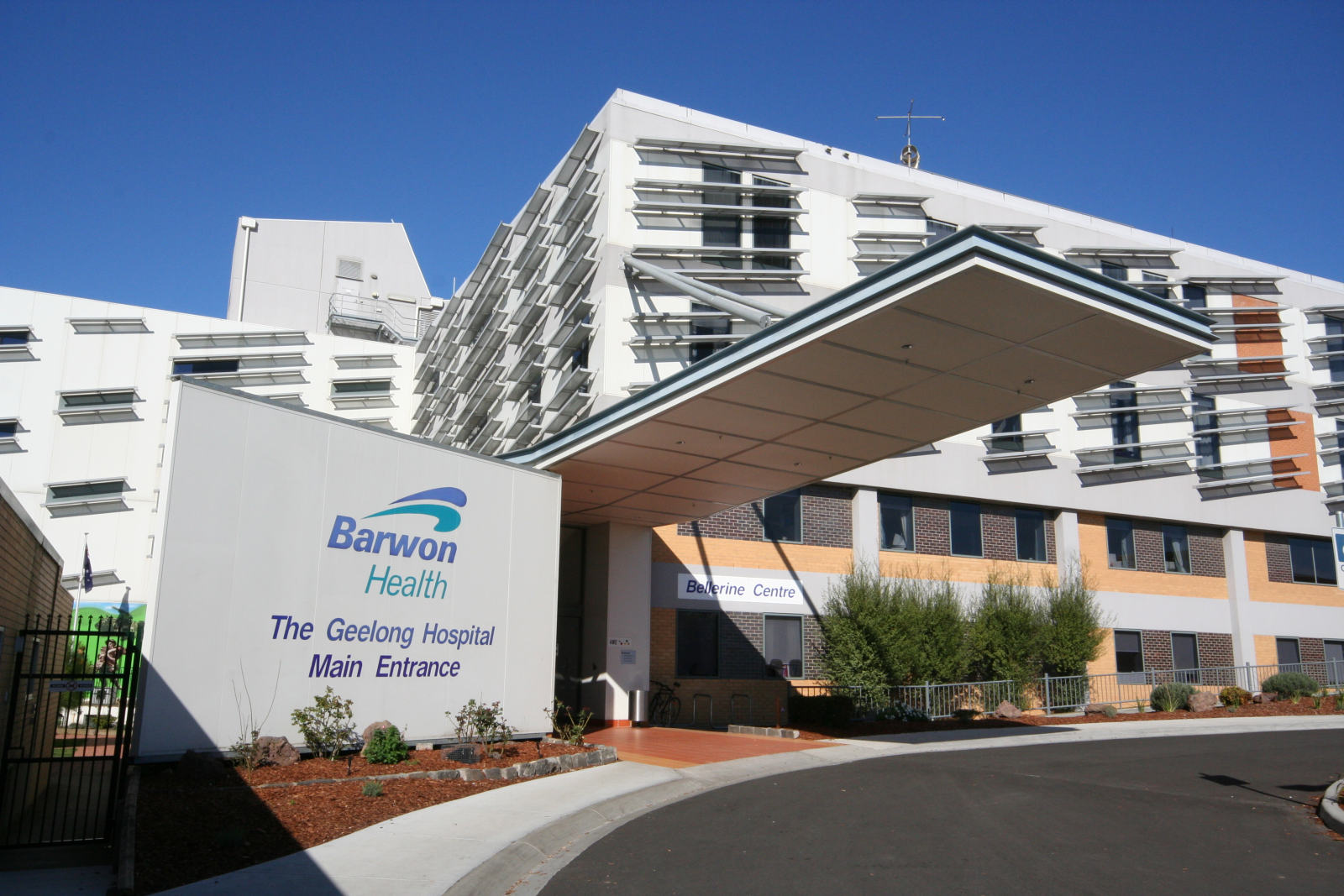
- Main entrance of Geelong Hospital, 2007

Geography
- Location: Ryrie Street, Geelong, Victoria, Australia
- Coordinates: 38.1523°S 144.3657°E

Services
- Beds: 406

History
- Opened: 1852 (Geelong Infirmary and Benevolent Asylum)

Links
- Lists: Hospitals in Australia

The University Hospital Geelong, formerly the Geelong Hospital, is an Australian public hospital located in Ryrie Street, Geelong, Victoria. The hospital is part of Barwon Health, Victoria's largest regional health care provider, which has 21 sites. It is the largest hospital in regional Victoria and the only tertiary hospital outside of the Melbourne Metropolitan area. The site is bounded by Ryrie, Bellarine, Myers, and Swanston Streets.

== History ==
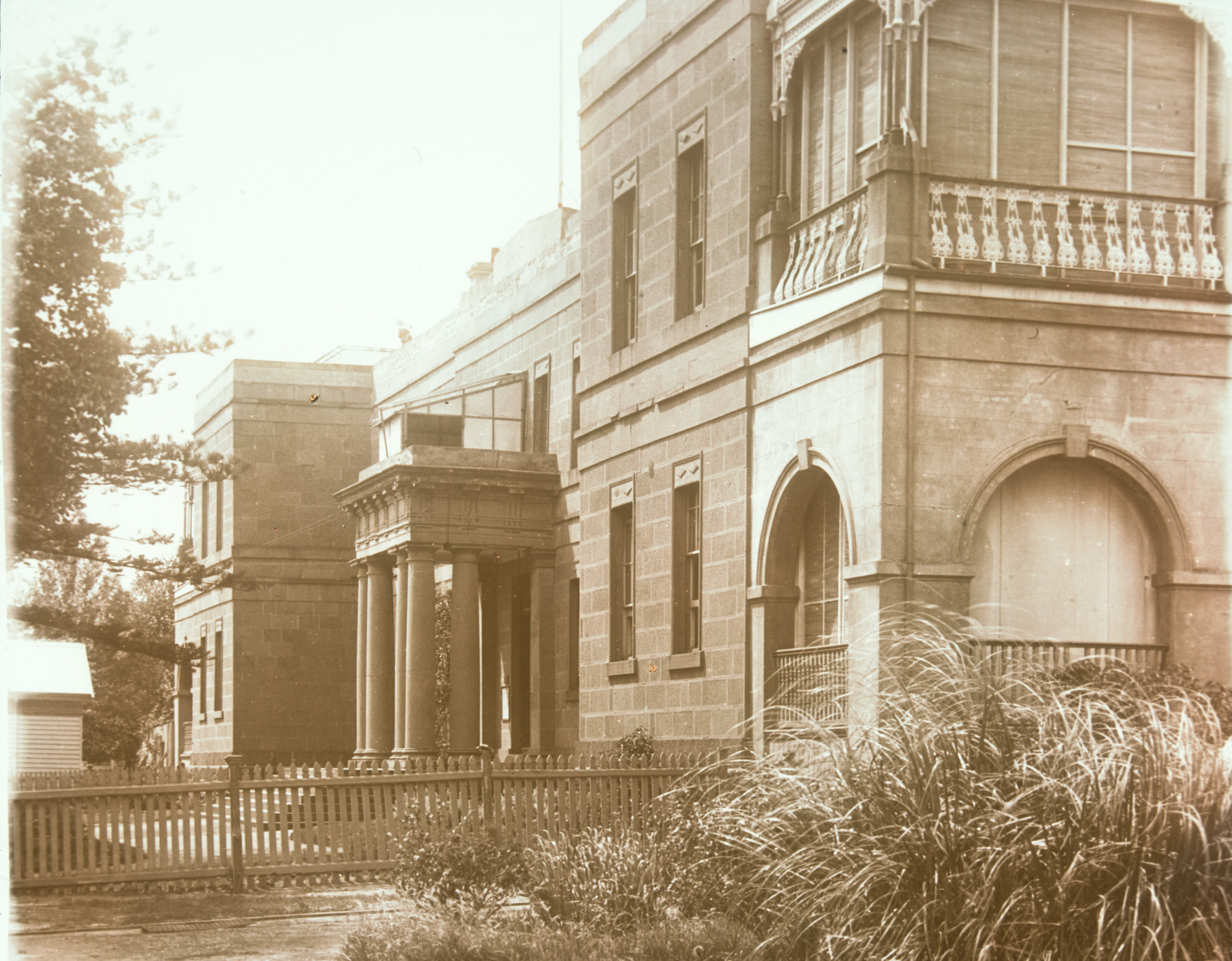
Geelong Hospital, 1921

Originally opened as the Geelong Infirmary and Benevolent Asylum in 1852 on the Ryrie Street site, it treated 344 inpatients in its first year. By 1862 the number of patients treated had increased to 2450. By the 1890s the buildings were deeded obsolete, with proposals being made for the hospital's relocation to Eastern Park. This was blocked by the city council who objected to the loss of parkland.

By 1917 a public meeting was held calling for a new hospital, to be dedicated to the memory of Lord Kitchener. A building fund was set up, and work started in October 1922. The Geelong and District Kitchener Memorial Hospital as it was known opened on 13 March 1924. That building consisted of a central administration block, which remained until 2007, with wards branching off to each side. From 1927, the Gala Day festival in Geelong helped raise money for the hospital.

Further additions to the buildings included the boiler house on Swanston Street, the Kardinia Ward along Bellerine Street in the 1920s, and the Baxter House maternity hospital, across Bellerine Street, in 1954. Baxter House was sold and became the Geelong Private Hospital for a few years. The private hospital closed in 2018, and Barwon Health resumed use of the building.

The 1960s saw the Birdsey Wing built behind the existing buildings, with the 1980s seeing the demolition of the old western wards and their replacement with the Heath Wing containing the new emergency department and main entrance. The Dax House psychiatric ward was also built at this time. The Andrew Love cancer centre was built in the early 1990s on the site of the older eastern wards.

The hospital became officially known as Geelong Hospital in 1966, and University Hospital Geelong in 2014, to reflect a greater emphasis on teaching and research.

== Recent history ==
The Baxter House maternity hospital was closed in the late 1990s, being relocated into a redeveloped Dax House and renamed the Bellerine Centre. The psychiatric wards were moved into the former Swanston Street Primary School which had closed some years earlier. The Geelong Private Hospital took over the empty Baxter House.

The Andrew Love cancer centre was redeveloped during 2006, and a new main entrance was provided to the hospital from Bellerine Street. A new administration office and emergency ward has been constructed on the Ryrie Street side of the hospital.

The hospital was renamed University Geelong Hospital in 2014 to signify Barwon Health's partnership as a teaching facility with Deakin University.

In 2015, a new wing was opened atop the existing emergency and administration building to allow for further capacity, especially in orthopaedic and oncology services. A helipad has also been opened atop the new wing, allowing for quicker ambulance access to the hospital.

In the 2022 Victorian State Budget, $500m was allocated to build new operating theatres and expanded paediatric and maternity units at the hospital.

== Services ==
As the only tertiary referral centre in regional Victoria, it provides service covering nearly all specialities, with the exception of organ transplant and neurosurgery. It has a primary catchment area of over 350,000 people, which a catchment area of over 500,000 for some specialities. It has a speciality catchment area from Werribee to the South Australia border.

=== Speciality Units ===
Medical Units (Inpatient)

- General Medical
- Respiratory/Thoracic
- Infectious Disease
- Neurology/Stroke unit
- Endocrinology/Diabetes
- Anaesthesiology/Pain Management
- Palliative care
- Cardiology (including a coronary care unit, and cardiac cath labs)
- Intensive Care
- Emergency Department
- Gastroenterology
- Nephrology (Renal)
- Oncology (medical oncology, radiation oncology, and clinical haematology)
- Maternity Services
- Paediatric
- Gynaecology
- Radiology/Nuclear medicine (including interventional radiology)
- Rheumatology
- Dermatology

Surgical Units

- General (including Upper Gastrointestinal, and colorectal)
- Urology
- Vascular
- Plastics/Reconstructive
- Maxillofacial & Oral
- Otolaryngology (Ear, Nose, Throat, Head and Neck)
- Ophthalmology
- Orthopaedic
- Cardiothoracic
- Neurosurgery (Outpatients Only)

Acute Psychiatric Unit

== Facts ==
- Has 406 acute hospital beds. Barwon Health has a total 1016 beds.
- Patient stays resulted in over 167,000 Bed days in 2014-2015
- Emergency Department sees over 62,000 patients a year
- Chairs in Medicine, Surgery and Psychiatry with the University of Melbourne.
- Chairs in Medicine and Nursing with Deakin University
- Associated with the Gordon Institute of TAFE Division 2 nursing students.
