= Rose Jacobs =

Australian television presenter

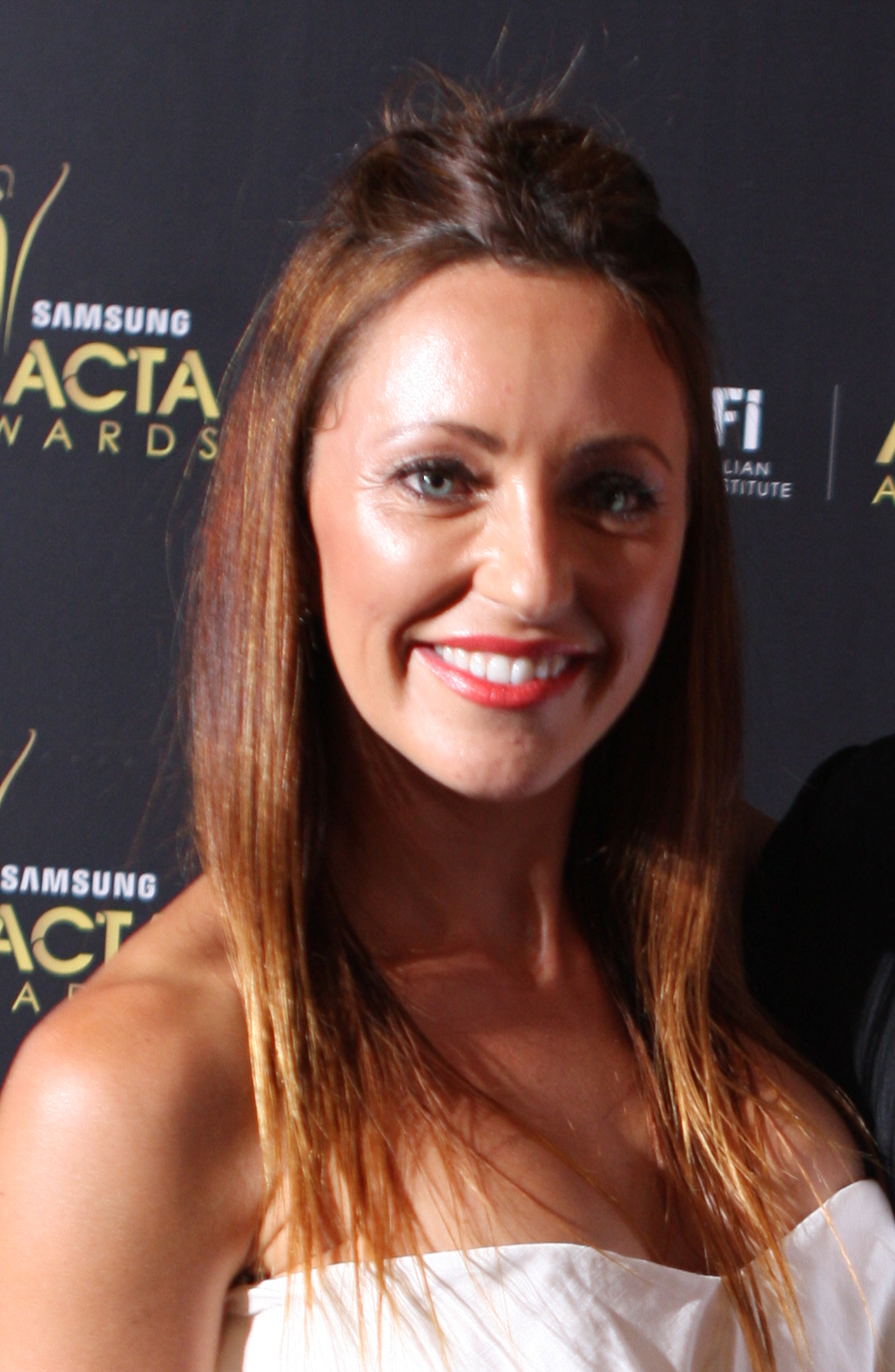
Rose Jacobs at the AACTA Awards, in January 2012

Rose Jacobs is a weather presenter, travel expert and television host.

== Career ==
Jacobs has worked in various capacities with The Weather Channel beginning in 2005, including roles such as snow reporter, senior producer as well as the morning weather anchor for the Channel. She then went on to present on the Seven Network's travel and lifestyle program, Sydney Weekender, airing 5:30 p.m. Saturday evenings from 2008 to 2014.

Prior to her role with The Weather Channel Jacobs worked in a variety of television and radio roles in Australia as a producer and as a presenter for the Nine Network's Boatique program, as well as the Today Show, Sky News, Radio 2UE, and The Australian Radio Network. She has a combined degree in Television Journalism and International Politics and has also completed a Meteorological training course at the Bureau of Meteorology in Melbourne.

In April 2014, Jacobs was appointed weather presenter on Ten Eyewitness News Weekend on Network Ten as well as a fill-in weather presenter during the weekday bulletins. She also signed up as Foxtel's travel expert for The Lifestyle Channels, following the success of her blog poopypropeller.blogspot.com.au - a sanity-saving guide for parents travelling with kids. She is also currently working as the travel expert for radio station KIIS 106.5

In May 2014, Jacobs was made redundant from Network Ten.

== Personal life ==
Jacobs was married to Steven Jacobs, a weather presenter for the Nine Network's Today, they married in Bali in May 2010. In November 2010, Steven Jacobs announced on Today that Rose was pregnant with their first child.

In May 2011, she gave birth to a daughter.

In November 2011, Jacobs filled in for her husband Steven Jacobs and also for Emma Freedman as weather presenter on Weekend Today.

In April 2013, Rose and Steven welcomed their second daughter.

In March 2018, Rose said that she had split from Steve.
