= Just Kidding (Australian TV series) =

Australian television series

Just Kidding is an Australian prank television series which ran on the Nine Network from 1994 to 1996.

Just Kidding was first hosted by Steven Jacobs and Sofie Formica with Kimberley Davies taking over from Formica in 1996. The series was similar to Candid Camera, using hidden cameras to film members of the public being pranked with set-up hoax situations.

When it first started the series was a ratings success. Mark Lawrence in the Age's Green Guide wrote "Just Kidding is not a program that calls for deep critical analysis. It is well packaged; Formica and Jacobs are pleasant hosts; and the concocted scenarios provide plenty of laughs."
