= Becker Entertainment =

Australian television production company

- Formerly: R.A. Becker & Co (1965–1993)
- Genre: Australian entertainment company
- Founded: 1965
- Founder: Russell Becker
- Defunct: 2008
- Successor: Prime Television; Icon Film Distribution
- Headquarters: Sydney, New South Wales, Australia
- Owner: Prime Television
- Divisions: REP Distribution; PRO Films
- Subsidiaries: Dendy Films; Dendy Cinemas

Becker Entertainment is an Australian production company.

== History ==
The company was founded in 1965 as R.A. Becker by Russell Becker, one of the pioneers of commercial television in Australia. Becker was Australia's first independent distributor of television programs. It went on to become a major producer of Australian versions of numerous American game shows.

In 1976, Russell's son Richard Becker bought out Fremantle International's Australian unit, who was producing several game shows to the markets of Australia and New Zealand. In 1977, Richard Becker was joining the family business after four years with the Commonwealth Attorney-General's Department, and helped them expand the television division. Becker begin producing game shows starting in 1984 with an Australian version of the American game show Child's Play, followed in 1985 by an Australian version of Now You See It and then in 1987 by an Australian version of The Newlywed Game.

In 1987, the company launched its subsidiary, PRO Films, to produce feature films in the Los Angeles market.

The company expanded into theatrical film distribution around the same time as REP (standing for Richard Entertainment Partners) after Russell Becker's son Richard and his two friends Richard Sheffield and Richard Guardian who collaborated with him on the move into film. Richard Sheffield ran REP as a Becker employee until he left to establish the Australian office of PolyGram Pictures).

The Australian box office success of Four Weddings and a Funeral fuelled the listing of Becker Entertainment Limited on the Australian Stock Exchange in 1995, with Richard Becker as Managing Director and Russell as Chairman. Around the same time, PolyGram and Becker parted ways, with PolyGram Filmed Entertainment establishing its Australian unit.

Subsequently, Becker Entertainment purchased the Dendy Cinema chain and became Australia's largest exhibitor of art house or limited release theatrical films. The company begin expanding its market to Indonesia, with a 10-year deal with broadcaster RCTI in 1998.

In the late 1990s, the company gained the rights to the 600-title library from TMS Distribution (the former incarnation of Hoyts Distribution). In 2003, the company expanded its holdings to include a new international sales unit Becker Films International, led by Reiko Bradley, which manages international sales of Becker's films around the world. A year later, the company decided to sell its stake in home video distributor Magna Pacific for $27 million.

Becker Entertainment was sold to Prime Television in 2007. Around the same time, Becker sold off its Dendy Films and Dendy Cinemas chain to Icon Film Distribution in 2008.

After stepping down from Becker Entertainment in 2007, Richard Becker went on to establish a new company, Becker Film Group in 2008

With the remaining assets owned by Prime Television Limited, the company was eventually delisted from the Australian Stock Exchange and the remaining rights absorbed into Prime Television Limited. Prime went on to rename the company WASTAR ENTERTAINMENT PTY LTD ACN 073 853 371.

== Relaunch ==
On 22 September 2016, Daniel Becker and RJ Brent successfully lobbied ASIC to register a new trading entity of BECKER ENTERTAINMENT PTY LTD ACN 614 954 157.

This company was established as a Film and TV Production Company, and started focusing on projects in 2017 with My Day Job and Ravenswood.

== See also ==
- Prime Television Limited
- List of film production companies
- List of television production companies
