= Frank Wayne =

American game show producer and host (1917–1988)

- Born: Francis Rossi Jr. July 9, 1917; Boston, Massachusetts, U.S.
- Died: March 18, 1988 (aged 70); Los Angeles, California, U.S.
- Occupations: Producer; host
- Known for: Executive producer of The Price is Right (1972–1988)
- Children: 2

Frank Wayne (born Rocco Francis Rossi Jr.; July 9, 1917 – March 18, 1988) was an American game show producer and host. Born in Boston, Massachusetts, he was also associated with Mark Goodson Productions.

== Career ==
Wayne was the original executive producer of the current incarnation of The Price Is Right from its 1972 premiere until his death in 1988. He created the show's most popular pricing game, Plinko, and many others. Both of his sons, Philip Wayne Rossi and Mark Wayne, also worked on Price.

Wayne is also credited with creating The Match Game in 1962 and Now You See It in 1974 for Mark Goodson–Bill Todman Productions. He filled in for Bud Collyer on Beat the Clock in Summer 1953 while a writer/stunt creator on the show, then later became the show's producer.

As an independent producer, Wayne created and produced Laugh Line, a game show hosted by Dick Van Dyke.

== Death ==
On March 18, 1988, Wayne died in Los Angeles, California. After Wayne's death, former longtime host Bob Barker became the executive producer of The Price Is Right, holding the title until his 2007 retirement. According to producer Roger Dobkowitz, "When Frank Wayne passed on, Bob became the official Executive Producer of the show. However, in reality, Bob was the de facto executive producer since the '70s... he just didn't have the title. In other words, Bob basically went along with what the producers wanted... but he had veto power. If Bob wanted something done, the show would do it. Please don't get the wrong impression... Bob was not interested in taking over the show... he just wanted some things done a certain way that he felt important to make the show better and his performance better. During the years after Frank died, he let Phil Wayne and me run the show. Then after Phil left, I was the sole producer. I had much leeway in doing things... I just had to check them out with Bob first (new games, set changes, etc.). Bob's office was his dressing room... we would confer there either before or after the show."

Upon his death, a short tribute was recorded by Barker, which aired after an episode of The Price is Right as an attached segment that followed the end credits:

For the past 16 years since the first day that the current run of The Price Is Right has been on the air, our executive producer has been Mr. Frank Wayne. Frank passed away on March 18th. I speak for the entire Price Is Right family when I say "We'll miss you, Frank."

— Bob Barker

Following is a message saying "Frank Wayne July 9, 1917-March 18, 1988."

Media offices
Preceded by N/A	Executive Producer of The Price Is Right; 1972–1988	Succeeded by Bob Barker
