= Todd McKenney =

Australian dancer and TV personality

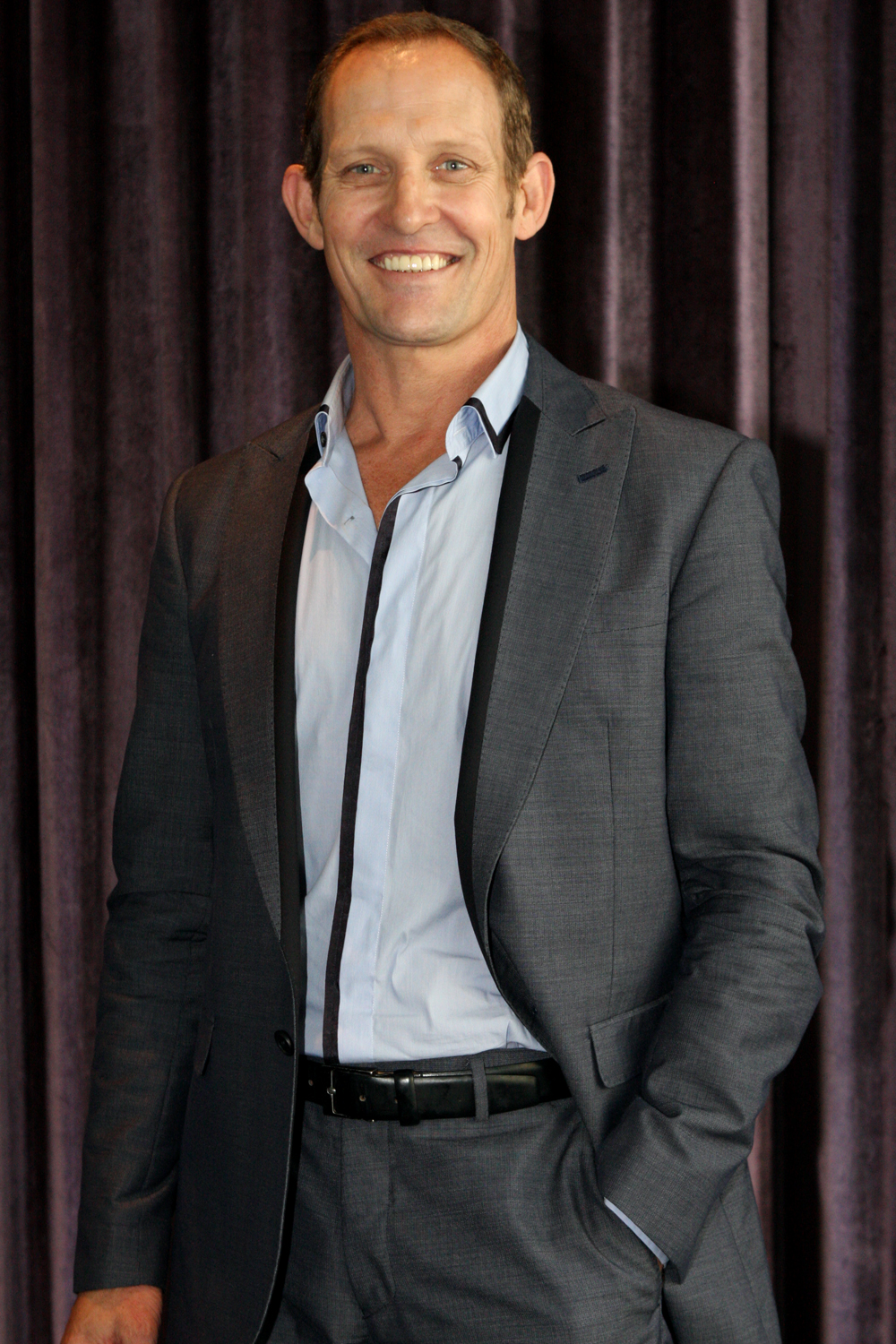
- Born: 31 March 1965 (age 61); Perth, Western Australia, Australia
- Occupations: Dancer; singer; theatre performer; TV personality; host

Todd McKenney (born 31 May 1965) is an Australian dancer, theatre performer and TV personality. He is best known as a judge on the Australian television talent show Dancing with the Stars.

As a theatre performer, he has appeared in numerous productions, notably singer Peter Allen in the theatre production The Boy from Oz.

== Early life ==
McKenney grew up in Perth, where his father was a jail warden and his mother a dance teacher. They separated when he was 9. He began his entertainment career on a children's television show as Percy Penguin.

McKenney trained in jazz, tap, acrobatics and ballroom dancing. He represented Australia in ballroom and Latin American dancing, and won many international awards.

== Career ==
McKenney has performed on stage since 1983 in productions including 42nd Street, The Pirates of Penzance, Camelot, La Cage aux Folles, Singin' in the Rain, and Priscilla Queen of the Desert - the Musical. In 1992, he played the role of ballroom dancer Nathan Starkey in Baz Luhrmann's film Strictly Ballroom, alongside his future Dancing with the stars Australia co-star Sonia Kruger, as well as Paul Mercurio.

McKenney rose to fame in 1998 when he created the lead role of Peter Allen in the Australian production of The Boy from Oz. He performed the role 766 times between 1998 and 2000. However, when the production went to Broadway in 2003, Hugh Jackman landed the role over McKenney.

Outside musical theatre, McKenney is best known as a judge on Australia's version of Dancing with the Stars. He has appeared on all fifteen seasons of the show since 2004.

McKenney took on his first non-musical role in 2006, starring as Michael Minetti in the Ensemble Theatre production of Richard Alfieri's two-hander play Six Dance Lessons in Six Weeks with Nancye Hayes at the Playhouse Theatre in the Sydney Opera House. The play remains the most successful in the Ensemble Theatre's history, and the pair reprised these roles ten years later at the Concourse Theatre, Chatswood, reuniting with Sandra Bates for her final directorial role. McKenney performed his Casting Couch production at the Ensemble's Kirribilli premises in 2016, interviewing Queenie van de Zandt, Georgie Parker, and Simon Burke in different performances.

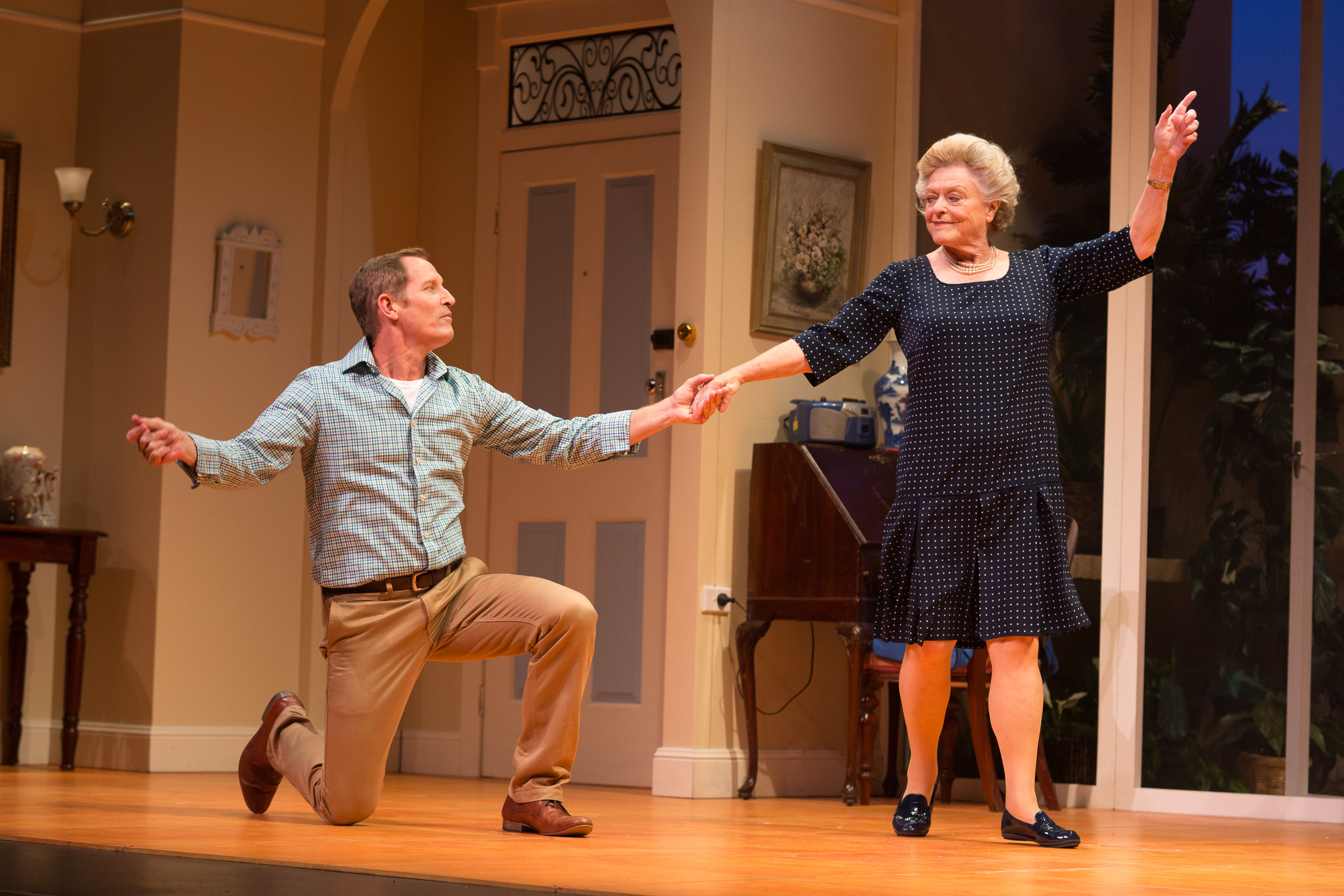
McKenny in Six Dance Lessons in Six Weeks with Nancye Hayes

In 2006, McKenney hosted the television game show You May Be Right, which was cancelled after a month on air. He hosted the breakfast program on Sydney radio station Mix 106.5 with Dancing with the Stars co-host Sonia Kruger, as well as Andy Grace, from January 2008 until September 2009.

On 19 May 2010 and on 27 December 2010, McKenney guest co-hosted The Morning Show alongside Kylie Gillies, while regular male presenter Larry Emdur was on holidays.

In 2011, McKenney portrayed Lord Evelyn Oakley in a limited showing of Anything Goes in Melbourne, alongside Amanda Harrison. In 2012, he played the role of Rooster in the hit musical Annie alongside Anthony Warlow, Nancye Hayes and Alan Jones.

McKenney plays Teen Angel in the 2013-2014 Australian National Touring Company production of the hit musical Grease, starring alongside Bert Newton, John Paul Young, Rob Mills, and Gretel Scarlett. Although he is on stage for less than four minutes, critics have said he "steals the show."

In 2005, McKenney released an album, Just a Gigolo. The title track was a duet with Maggie Kirkpatrick. Seven of the twelve tracks were Peter Allen compositions. The album also included "I Don't Care Too Much", a Kander and Ebb song that was dropped from Cabaret. McKenney released a tribute album to Peter Allen on Friday 22 November 2013, called Todd McKenney sings Peter Allen.

In 2018, McKenney's performance as the neurotic Felix Ungar in the Australian stage production of The Odd Couple has received largely positive reviews. McKenney's physical comedy and facial expressions were frequently mentioned as a major strength, some reviewers found his American accent occasionally wavered or noted a "tad too camp" delivery, many praised his consistent verve and expert comedic timing.

In 2019 he headlined a production of Barnum.

In 2022 he was in a production of Cinderella.

Beginning in 2023 he was in a production of Wicked as The Wizard.

== Personal life ==
McKenney is gay. He has a daughter (who was conceived via IVF), Charlotte Wood, who lives in Melbourne with her mother, Anne Wood. McKenney has said his first girlfriend, at twelve years of age, was dancer and presenter Sonia Kruger.

In April 2008, McKenney was found unconscious in a Sydney park and revived by ambulance officers. Police found a small amount of the drug gamma-hydroxybutyrate (GHB), a date-rape drug, in his trousers and charged him with drug possession. McKenney publicly maintained his innocence, claiming his drink had been spiked and the drugs planted on him by someone experiencing "tall poppy syndrome" (envy of his success). The charges were dropped in November 2008 when police determined the "prospect of a conviction is remote" due to a lack of evidence.

He is a student of Auslan sign language and has worked within the deaf community all around Australia. Todd is also a keen supporter of the Cerebral Palsy Alliance.

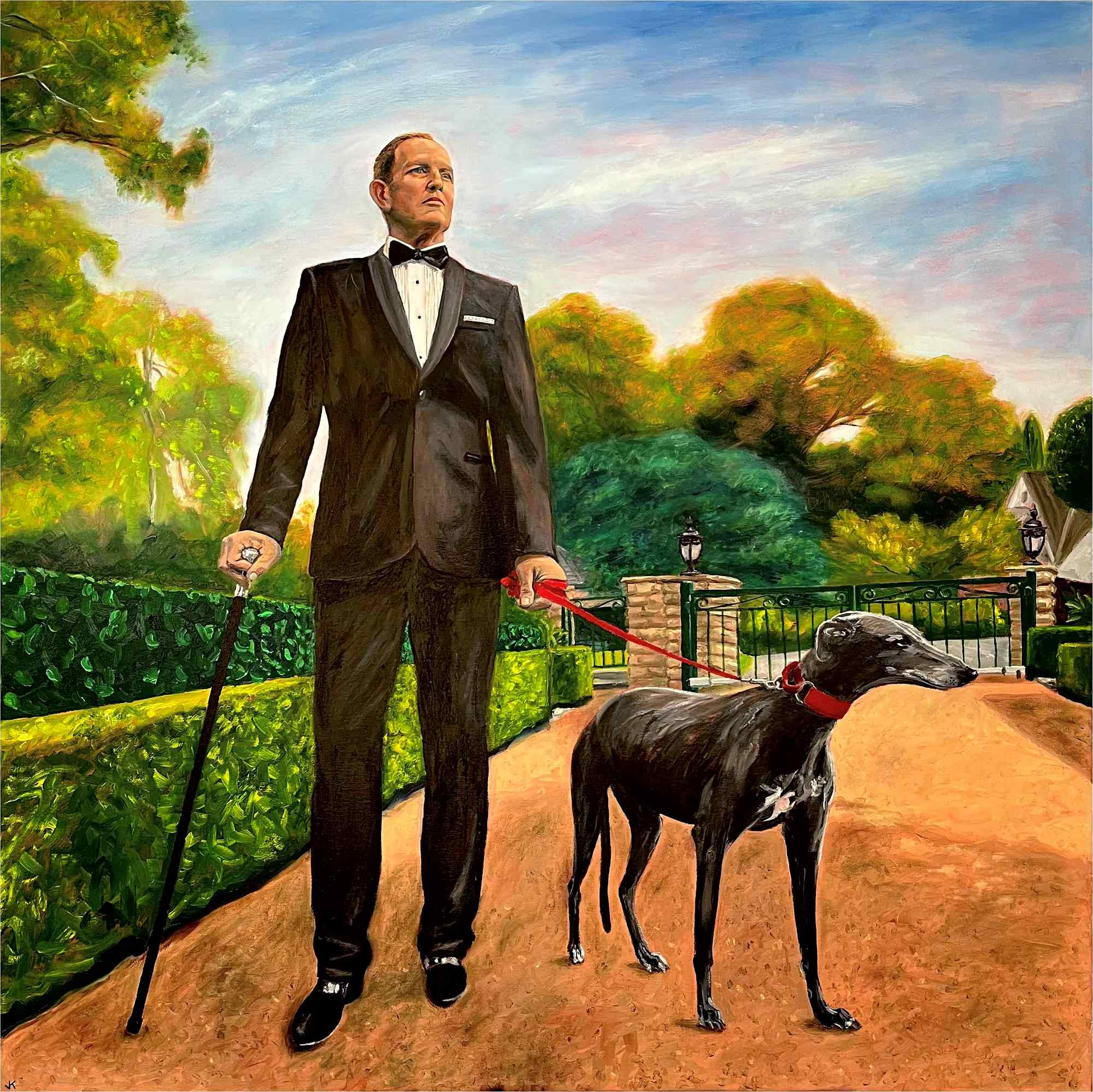
Double Act - Todd McKenney and Nancye Hayes (Greyhound) by artist John Klein, 2024

Another of Todd's passions is his greyhounds and for the past four years he has been the face of the Greyhounds As Pets National Adoption Day, and more recently a GAP NSW Ambassador. Todd was painted by Australian artist John Klein with his greyhound 'Nancye Hayes' as Klein's entry in the 2024 Archibald Prize.

During the COVID-19 pandemic beginning in 2020, Todd McKenney launched a website, Todd Creates, in order for members of the theatrical and entertainment communities to pivot their skills in order to make face masks and continue to earn an income while all theatres were closed. He then forged a partnership with Everyday Market from Woolworths in order for small-medium-sized Australian businesses to have a space to sell their products on the new marketplace, offering an unprecedented opportunity for these businesses to grow.

On April 7, 2017, he was banned from driving for three months and fined $375 with a charge relating to drink-driving. He was pulled over on George St in Sydney's CBD at 10.50pm on March 7, after police noticed the headlights of his car were off. He was breath-tested and blew a reading of 0.05.

In 2019, while speaking on a Melbourne LGBTQI+ podcast, McKenney revealed he had been in a relationship with his sister's husband, Simon Gallaher, prior to their marriage: "She married my ex-boyfriend and is still married to my ex-boyfriend but just has never mentioned it to me. It's weird isn't it? I don't think I've ever spoken about it publicly."

== Awards and nominations ==
=== Helpmann Awards ===
The Helpmann Awards is an awards show, celebrating live entertainment and performing arts in Australia, presented by industry group Live Performance Australia since 2001.

Year	Nominee / work	Award	Result	Ref.
2001	Todd McKenney – The Boy from Oz	Helpmann Award for Best Male Actor in a Musical	Won	
2009	Todd McKenney – Priscilla Queen of the Desert – the Musical	Best Male Actor in a Musical	Nominated	
2012	Todd McKenney – Annie	Helpmann Award for Best Male Actor in a Supporting Role in a Musical	Nominated	
2015	Todd McKenney – Anything Goes	Best Male Actor in a Musical	Nominated	
2015	Todd McKenney – La Cage aux Folles	Best Male Actor in a Musical	Nominated	

=== Mo Awards ===
The Australian Entertainment Mo Awards (commonly known informally as the Mo Awards), were annual Australian entertainment industry awards. They recognise achievements in live entertainment in Australia from 1975 to 2016. Todd McKenney won three awards in that time.

Year	Nominee / work	Award	Result (wins only)
1998	Todd McKenney	Male Musical Theatre Performer of the Year	Won
1999	Todd McKenney	Male Musical Theatre Performer of the Year	Won
2004	Todd McKenney	Versatile Variety Performance of the Year	Won
