= Holey Moley (Australian TV series) =

Australian reality game show

- Genre: Sports entertainment; Reality competition; Comedy
- Created by: Chris Culvenor
- Presented by: Rob Riggle; Greg Norman; Matt Shirvington; Sonia Kruger
- Country of origin: Australia
- Original language: English
- No. of seasons: 1
- No. of episodes: 11 (+2 specials)

Production
- Executive producer: Matt Apps
- Camera setup: Multi-camera
- Running time: 60—68 minutes
- Production companies: Unanimous Media; Eureka Productions

Original release
- Network: Seven Network
- Release: 1 February – 1 March 2021

Holey Moley is an Australian reality game show based on the international U.S.-based Holey Moley format. Following the premise of the original version, the series features contestants competing against each other in a series of head-to-head, sudden-death matchups on a supersized miniature golf obstacle course. Greg Norman stars as the resident golf pro, alongside expert commentators Rob Riggle (who also appears on the American version) and Matt Shirvington, along with host and sideline correspondent Sonia Kruger.

The series premiered on 1 February 2021. After the conclusion of the first season on 22 February 2021, a celebrity special Celebrity Holey Moley aired on 28 February 2021, with a kids special Holey Moley Junior following on 1 March 2021.

Although the first episode launched with over one million viewers, the series ultimately garnered lower than expected ratings and was absent at the network's 2022 upfronts. However Seven has yet to officially cancel the series.

== Format ==
Each regular episode sees eight contestants, paired off against each other, tackle a series of miniature golf holes which contain various obstacles and distractions in a two-round elimination tournament. The final three contestants (the winners from the second round, and the winner of a second-round losers' playoff) then compete in a final round, with the winner of the episode winning a plaid jacket and golden putter. They proceed to a grand final where they will compete for a $100,000 grand prize.

In Holey Moley Junior the child contestants play the course while their adult parents take on the obstacles. In this version, the grand prize is a $10,000 golf shopping spree in addition to the plaid jacket and golden putter.

== Production ==
In October 2019, Seven Network announced it would be adapting the series in 2020, produced by Eureka Productions. The adaptation had the working title of Mega Mini Golf, as "Holey Moley" was already the name of a themed restaurant chain in Australia. By February 2020, Seven had secured the rights to the name Holey Moley and announced that professional golfer Greg Norman will be the series resident golf pro, with Rob Riggle and Brian ‘BT’ Taylor serving as commentators and Olympia Valance serving as sideline reporter. Seven intended to premiere the show in August 2020, after the original date of the 2020 Summer Olympics.

Filming for the series originally began in March 2020 in the United States at Sable Ranch in Canyon Country, Santa Clarita, California, where earlier in the year the second season of the American version of Holey Moley had completed filming. The cast and crew consisted of over 500 people split between Seven Network and Eureka Productions staff, and 50 contestants were flown over from Australia to compete in the series. However later that month, series production was abandoned due to the COVID-19 pandemic after a crew member informed producers he had recently been in contact with someone who has since tested positive with coronavirus. The shoot had also faced unexpected production delays due to bad weather. In June 2020 it was announced that the show will restart filming on a set built in Australia, with an intended broadcast date in early 2021. The series was initially casting for only adults, however in July 2020, casting reopened searching for kids aged 8 to 12, along with a parent or legal guardian.

In October 2020, Sonia Kruger was confirmed as the host of the show. She also replaced Valance as sideline reporter, while Matt Shirvington replaced Brian Taylor as commentator due to his AFL commitments. Filming for the series commenced in early October 2020 on a new custom built course in the suburb of Thornlands in Redland City, south-east of Brisbane. 96 contestants participated in the two week shoot. In addition to the regular episodes, two one-off special episodes (a celebrity special and an episode with children and their parents as contestants) were also filmed.

The Thornlands Holey Moley set was intended to be reused for potential international adaptations from Germany, the UK and France, and the return of the Australian version for a second season was initially hinged on the international adaptations using the set to financially justify another local season. However due the pandemic and travel restrictions this did not eventuate before Eureka's contract for the site expired on 29 July 2023. In addition, local residents have petitioned Redland City Council to find a new site for any further Holey Moley filming because they were kept awake until 4:00am by noise during filming of the series.

== Courses ==
The larger-than-life mini-golf course for the first season features supersized themed holes including:

- Dutch Courage: Contestants must hit through a small mini-golf-style windmill situated in between two large windmills. The large windmills have four large, quickly rotating blades that can knock the player off the putting surface and cause stroke penalties. The hole lies past the second large windmill, on a slope.
- Polcano: Similar to Mount Holey Moley, but contestants zipline onto a narrow totem pole rather than across the entire water hazard. Falling into the water results in a one-stroke penalty.
- Uranus: Similar to Arc de Trigolf, contestants must putt the ball around the outer ring of Uranus. There is a channel where if the contestants land, could provide a shot at a hole in one. After the contestants putt (if the result is not a hole-in-one), they must traverse 4 planets to get to the green. If they fall in, they receive a stroke penalty.
- Parbeque: Similar to Buns and Wieners from the US Version, contestants must putt through a rotisserie to the other side of the field. After the contestants putt, they must climb over a separate rotisserie and not be thrown into the hot coals. If they fall in, they receive a stroke penalty.
- Putt the Plank: Contestants must first putt across a pirate ship's bow towards a red X. The closer to the red X gets a courtesy chip across the lagoon from pirate captain Dead Eye Dicko, while the other player gets a blindfolded courtesy chip. Then, they must cross the lagoon on the back of a shark to complete the hole, being careful not to fall in and get a penalty stroke.
- Slip N' Putt: Contestants must make their way atop an icy hill. The first one to the top gets the better-placed ball. Then, they must hit their ball through the legs of the polar bear and slide their way down the hill to the green to complete the hole.
- The Distractor: Contestants must try to sink a 12-foot putt with a distraction.
- Fowl Play: Unique to the Australian version, contestants putt up a ramp that splits into three channels in a chicken coop. The middle channel could provide a shot at a hole in one. The other two channels place the ball into hazard sections.
- Hole Number Two: Contestants must putt along a narrow ridge with water on one side and a row of porta-potties on the other, before attempting a 2.5-second sprint across the ridge before the porta-potty doors open and knock them into the water. If they fall into the water, they receive a one-stroke penalty.
- Surf N Turf: Contestants hit a ball up a large concave wave ramp 30 feet into the air, launching it backwards over their heads to an island green. If the ball does not land and stay on the green, the contestant must hit the ball across a skinny walkway instead after a one-stroke penalty.
- Putter Ducky: similar to Hole Number Two. Contestants must putt along a narrow bridge with a bubble bath on both sides, and two large rubber ducks in the middle. After the bridge, the ball needs enough momentum to pull a 180-degree turn on a ramp. Contestants then attempt to walk the bridge avoiding the rubber ducks. If they fall into the bubble bath, they receive a one-stroke penalty.
- Dragon's Breath: Contestants wearing fireproof armour must putt the ball through one of three holes underneath a drawbridge in order to lower it and putt the ball in the hole. While the contestants are trying to putt, dragons breathe fire at the contestant.
- Frankenputt: Players must putt through a series of electrical nodes and Dr. Frankenputt (a disguised Sir Goph)'s lair to the hole. Every stroke a player takes, they receive an electrical shock.
- Clowning Around: Each of the players is strapped into a circular apparatus in a standing position. The apparatus is then turned several times to disorient the players, and the players eventually have to putt the magnetized ball upside down to a rectangular green. Any miss gets a whipped cream pie in the face from one of the clowns accompanying the hole.
- The Tomb of Nefer–Tee–Tee: Greg Norman's much-lauded finale hole, which will appear in the season finale. In the American version, the hole is an "all-or-nothing" hole, and eventually had nothing to do with the schematic shown all during the season. Each player will get one shot to ace the hole per round, and only the person first holing the putt wins the jackpot grand prize of $100,000 and the Jeweled Putter of Nefer-Tee-Tee. The hole is almost 100 feet in length and contains three parts. After an unassuming tee area, the ball then enters a repurposed spinning disc from Sweet Spot, this time containing three Egyptian-style pyramids, and is coloured as a desert. Past that is the green, including walls on two sides and a crypt on the third (which opens when the winner is declared, containing the Jeweled Putter). It also contains several small square obstacles, which could also aid the golfer in holing the putt. If no golfer aces the hole after each has had a shot, the process continues until someone does.

== Episodes ==
=== Season 1 (2021) ===
No.	Title	Original release date	Australian viewers (millions)
1	"Episode 1"	1 February 2021	1,101,000
Holes featured are Dutch Courage, Polcano, Uranus, Parbeque, Putt the Plank, Slip N' Putt, The Distractor, and Fowl Play. Montana Strauss is declared the winner.
2	"Episode 2"	2 February 2021	820,000
Holes featured are Hole Number Two, Uranus, Fowl Play, Dutch Courage, Slip N' Putt, Surf N Turf, The Distractor, and Putter Ducky. Mark Duncan is declared the winner.
3	"Episode 3"	3 February 2021	627,000
Holes featured are Polcano, Slip N' Putt, Putt the Plank, Parbeque, Dragon's Breath, Hole Number Two, The Distractor, and Putter Ducky. Michelle Cowan is declared the winner.
4	"Episode 4"	7 February 2021	682,000
Holes featured are Polcano, Frankenputt, Uranus, Dutch Courage, Surf N Turf, Slip N' Putt, and Clowning Around. Amy Morris is declared the winner.
5	"Episode 5"	8 February 2021	606,000
Holes featured are Dutch Courage, Parbeque, Dragon's Breath, Fowl Play, Hole Number Two, Surf N Turf, The Distractor, and Frankenputt. Jayden Lawson is declared the winner.
6	"Episode 6"	9 February 2021	542,000
Holes featured are Slip N' Putt, Uranus, Hole Number Two, Dutch Courage, Dragon's Breath, Putt the Plank, The Distractor, and Fowl Play. Jesse Earnshaw is declared the winner.
7	"Episode 7"	14 February 2021	563,000
Holes featured are Dutch Courage, Hole Number Two, Putt the Plank, Polcano, Surf N Turf, Fowl Play, The Distractor, and Putter Ducky. Tom Knukel is declared the winner.
8	"Episode 8"	15 February 2021	521,000
Holes featured are Putt the Plank, Dutch Courage, Slip N' Putt, Parbeque, Hole Number Two, Uranus, Fowl Play and Jacinta Robinson. Nik Papoutsis is declared the winner.
9	"Episode 9"	16 February 2021	490,000
Holes featured are Polcano, Dutch Courage, Nathan Parmenter, Parbeque, Hole Number Two, Uranus, The Distractor, and Putter Ducky. Teresa Toye is declared the winner.
10	"Episode 10"	21 February 2021	528,000
Holes featured are Polcano, Slip N' Putt, Dutch Courage, Putt the Plank, Dragon's Breath, Hole Number Two, The Distractor, and Fowl Play. Daniel Thusberg is declared the winner.
11	"Grand Final"	22 February 2021	561,000
Holes featured are Surf N Turf, Slip N' Putt, Uranus, Putter Ducky, The Distractor, Polcano, Clowning Around, Frankenputt, and The Tomb of Nefer–Tee–Tee. Mark Duncan is declared the winner.

=== Celebrity Holey Moley ===
The following celebrities competed in the Celebrity Holey Moley special which aired on 28 February 2021:

Celebrity	Known for	Result
Barry Hall	Retired AFL player	Winner
Steven Bradbury	Olympic gold medalist	Finalist
Mat Rogers	Retired NRL player	Finalist
Erin Holland	Beauty Queen	
Angela Clancy	Former Big Brother contestant	
Ali Oetjen	Former Bachelorette contestant	
Eden Dally	Former Love Island contestant	
Denise Drysdale	Entertainment icon	Retired injured

== Ratings ==
=== Season 1 ===
No.	Title	Air date	Timeslot	Overnight ratings		Consolidated ratings		Total viewers	Ref(s)
No.	Title	Air date	Timeslot	Viewers	Rank	Viewers	Rank	Total viewers	Ref(s)
1	"Episode 1"	1 February 2021	Monday 7:30pm	983,000	3	117,000	1	1,101,000	
2	"Episode 2"	2 February 2021	Tuesday 7:30pm	737,000	6	83,000	5	820,000	
3	"Episode 3"	3 February 2021	Wednesday 7:30pm	543,000	11	84,000	10	627,000	
4	"Episode 4"	7 February 2021	Sunday 7:00pm	629,000	5	53,000	4	682,000	
5	"Episode 5"	8 February 2021	Monday 7:30pm	528,000	10	78,000	8	606,000	
6	"Episode 6"	9 February 2021	Tuesday 7:30pm	469,000	9	74,000	8	542,000	
7	"Episode 7"	14 February 2021	Sunday 7:00pm	510,000	7	53,000	7	563,000	
8	"Episode 8"	15 February 2021	Monday 7:30pm	468,000	12	53,000	10	521,000	
9	"Episode 9"	16 February 2021	Tuesday 7:30pm	436,000	13	54,000	13	490,000	
10	"Episode 10"	21 February 2021	Sunday 7:00pm	498,000	7	30,000	9	528,000	
11	"Grand Final"	22 February 2021	Monday 7:30pm	491,000	11	70,000	11	561,000	

=== Specials ===
No.	Title	Air date	Timeslot	Overnight ratings		Consolidated ratings		Total viewers	Ref(s)
No.	Title	Air date	Timeslot	Viewers	Rank	Viewers	Rank	Total viewers	Ref(s)
1	"Celebrity Holey Moley"	28 February 2021	Sunday 7:00pm	426,000	10	51,000	9	477,000	
2	"Holey Moley Junior"	1 March 2021	Monday 7:30pm	319,000	20	42,000	19	361,000	

== Notable contestants ==
- Michelle Cowan – The former and original Fremantle AFLW coach, now currently as an assistant coach of the West Coast Eagles.
