= Andy Grace =

Australian radio personality

Andy Grace (born 24 July 1970) is a commercial radio and television broadcaster and computer software developer.

Born in Melbourne, Australia, Grace started his career in 1995 on Fox FM in Melbourne, but became best known for the national Net@Nite IT and computer talkback radio show, networked to all the Today Network's Austereo network stations around Australia. The show featured the country's first live web-streamed concert performances, game reviews, technology news and live computer tech support and advice in both audio and video.

He was instrumental in producing and hosting the Telstra Concert of the Century Netcast in 1998, a nine-hour long production in both narrowband and near-broadcast quality video for cable modems – a world first, less than a year after their commercial launch.

Grace then controversially moved to rival Melbourne station TTFM to present their night show, initially losing substantial audience share, but regaining it within twelve months and eventually achieving the number one ratings slot in the show's second year.

He then left Australia to host the national net2nite show across the United States and returned in 2002 to take up a position on Sydney's then newest radio station Nova 96.9. He rated number one in both afternoon and evening timeslots according to the commercial radio industry's Nielsen ratings system.

From 2005 until mid-2007 he joined Triple M as the station's floater, but left to take up the position of breakfast anchor for Mix 106.5 Sydney, joining Seven Network personalities Sonia Kruger and Todd McKenney in 2008.

In September 2009 the Sonia and Todd Breakfast show was axed, however Grace continued to present the breakfast show solo until the end of the year. From 2010 until 2012, Grace hosted The Andy Grace Night Show on WSFM and Gold 104.3.

In 2012, he reappeared on DMG's SmoothFM in Sydney and Melbourne, previously called 91.5 (Melbourne) and 95.3 (Sydney).

From 2012, Grace has been developing software to deliver mobile, broadcast-quality video over IP networks for online and news media companies, including The Sydney Morning Herald, The Age, Australian Associated Press and the New South Wales State Emergency Service.

In March 2017, Grace returned to the airwaves on the Nine Network for weekly guest appearances on Today Extra, again teaming up with his former radio co-host Sonia Kruger and David Campbell.

He is married to Eloise Grace née Gentle, an actor, model, lawyer and former TV news reporter, and is father to three children.
