= Now You See It (Australian game show) =

Australian TV game show

- Genre: Game Show
- Presented by: Mike Meade (1985–1990); Sofie Formica (1991–1993); Scott McRae (1998–2000)
- Narrated by: Phil Darkins (1985–1988); Gary Clare (1988–1993); Lisa Barry (1998–2000)
- Country of origin: Australia
- Original language: English
- No. of seasons: 12
- No. of episodes: 780

Production
- Executive producer: Bill Davidson (1998–2000)
- Producer: Tony Ryan (1998–2000)
- Production locations: Brisbane, Queensland, Australia
- Running time: 24 minutes
- Production companies: Fremantle Telegame (1985-1993); All American Fremantle International (1998–2000); Becker Entertainment (1998–2000)

Original release
- Network: Seven Network
- Release: 3 June 1985 – 24 September 1993
- Network: Nine Network
- Release: 15 June 1998 – 11 February 2000

Related
- Download (game show)

Now You See It was an Australian children's game show that aired on the Seven Network from 1985 to 1993. It is based on the US show of the same title and was originally hosted by Mike Meade from 1985 and 1990 and "co-hosted" by a robot named "Melvin", who was a Tomy Omnibot toy, and pitted individual children against each other. The show's narrator, and original operator and voice of Melvin, from 1985 to 1988, was Brisbane-based New Zealand-born radio announcer and voice-over artist Phil Darkins. Melvin's uncle Morton (another, much more primitive-looking Omnibot) had his own segment on the show entitled "Morton's Mouldy Movies", in which Morton would comically narrate stories in a grandfatherly voice accompanied by black-and-white footage from silent film shorts. The original grandfatherly voice of Morton was performed by Phil Darkins (1985–1988) and included quick-fire 'live conversations' between Mike Meade, the narrator (Darkins), Melvin (Darkins) and Morton (Darkins), which required quite some vocal dexterity.

From 1991, the show was hosted by Sofie Formica, and ran as a week-long competition between two primary schools. The winning students in each episode would win individual prizes, and the overall winning school would win a larger prize, typically valued at around $2,000.

The show was initially produced under Richard Becker's supervision by the Australian unit of Fremantle International from 1985 to 1993, of which R.A. Becker & Co. was the Australian agent.

In 1998, Becker Entertainment, along with Fremantle Ltd. (then known as FremantleMedia), revived the show. Broadcast on the Nine Network, it was hosted by Scott McRae and produced by Tony Ryan, with Bill Davidson as Executive Producer. In 2000, the show was replaced with another game show, titled Download, which was also hosted by MacRae.

== Format ==
=== Free games ===
The host reads a clue, and the single-word answer is revealed one letter at a time, sometimes using one or more letters from the end of the previous answer. Letters are gradually revealed until someone buzzes in and gives the correct answer and score, or until only one letter is left in the word. This continues until that line is filled, and then a new line begins. The first player to guess five words correctly (seven in the 1998 revival) wins the round and a prize package, with the loser being eliminated.

Two line games are played, with the winners of each line game playing each other in the Big Board round.

=== Big Board ===
Words are hidden horizontally amongst other random letters in a large grid. The host reads a question, with the answer being one of the words hidden within the grid. The first player to buzz in guesses the horizontal line number in which the answer appears. If correct, he/she then gives the vertical position number where the answer begins, and then the word itself. The number of points a player receives for each correct answer is based on the sum of the word's line number and position number, making the words hidden in the lower-right portion of the board the most valuable. In the 1998 revival, points are doubled for the final 60 seconds of the game. The player with the most points when time runs out is the champion and progresses to the solo round. In event of a tie, however, a sudden-death word is played to determine the champion.

=== Solo Round ===
The solo round player needs to find seven words hidden within a large grid inside 60 seconds, with the help of the clues read by the host. The player must circle these words with a digital pen.

At the completion of the round the contestant was awarded a prize for their school. The early series prizes were uninspired, such as a labelling machine for the school front office. Later series awarded the contestant a small prize too, such as a cassette stereo.

== Products ==
A board game was released by Crown and Andrews in 1993.
