= Child's Play (Australian game show) =

Australian television series

- Created by: Mark Goodson
- Presented by: Jeff Phillips
- Voices of: Max Rowley
- Music by: Score Productions
- Country of origin: Australia
- Original language: English
- No. of seasons: 1
- No. of episodes: 80

Production
- Executive producer: Ken Grass
- Producer: Rod Kirk
- Running time: 30 minutes (inc. adverts)
- Production company: Fremantle International

Original release
- Network: Seven Network
- Release: 25 March – 3 September 1984

Child's Play is an Australian game show based on the American show of the same name. It aired on the Seven Network and was hosted by Jeff Phillips. The show first premiered on 25 March 1984 and ended on 3 September of that same year.

It was the first Goodson adaptation in Australia made independently by Fremantle International, who was an international licensor of Goodson-Todman shows, in association with R.A. Becker & Co., who was the Australian agent for Fremantle, for Seven Network as most of the previous Goodson adaptations in Australia was handled by Reg Grundy.

The gameplay followed mostly on the American rules, adjusted for the Australian market.

== Reception ==
The show received praise from critics, most notably the Sydney Morning Herald.
