= Barwon Health =

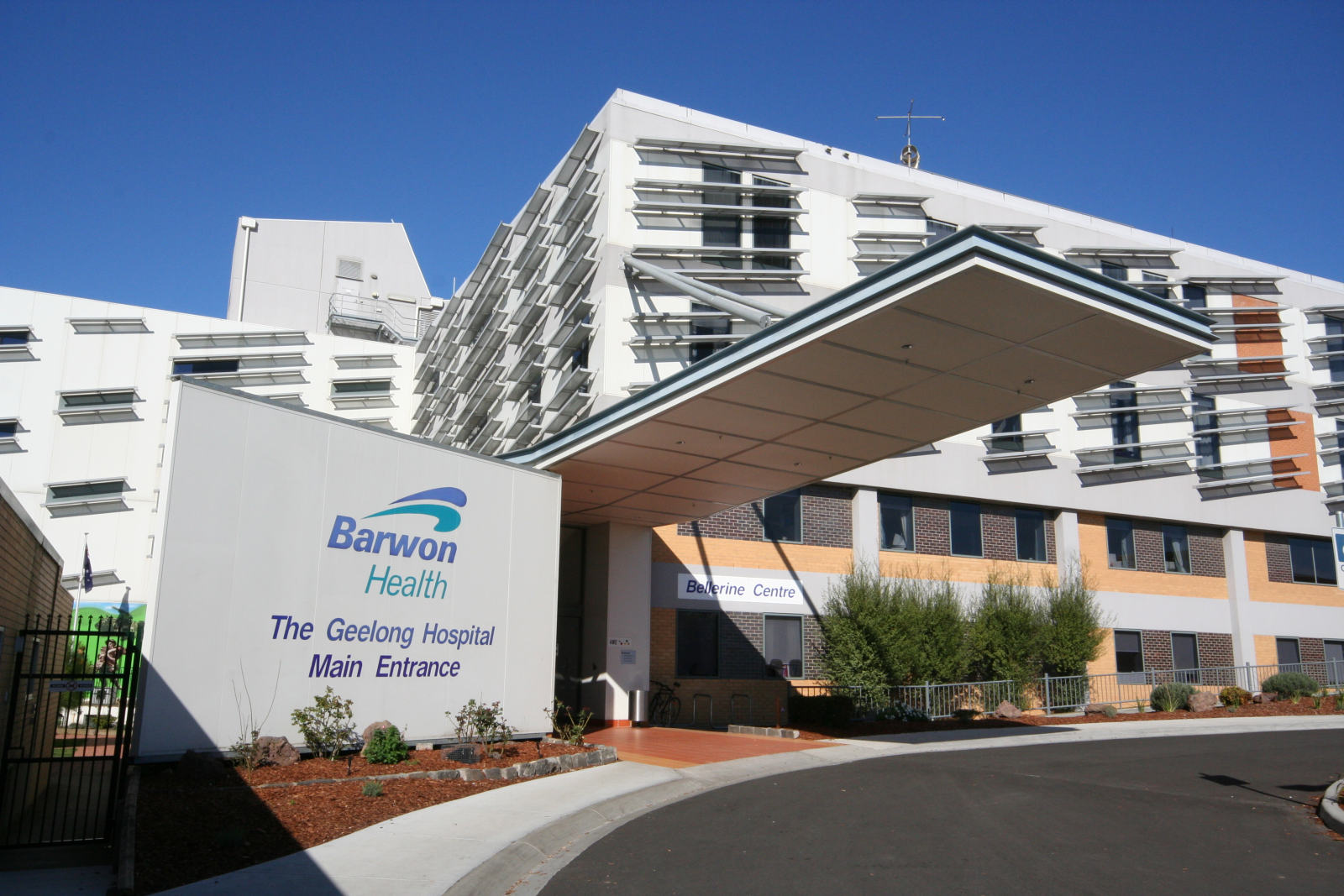
- University Hospital Geelong

Geography
- Location: Geelong, Victoria, Australia

History
- Opened: 1998

Links
- Website: http://www.barwonhealth.org.au/

Barwon Health is a health care provider in Geelong, Australia, with services ranging from hospital, rehabilitation, maternity, elderly care, community health centres and mental health services. Founded in 1998, Barwon Health is among the largest comprehensive regional health services in Australia and also one of the largest regional employers in the country. Its facilities include University Hospital Geelong (formerly Geelong Hospital), the McKellar Centre, an urgent care centre in Barwon Health North, and five community service centres in Victoria, located in Corio, Belmont, Newcomb, Torquay, and Anglesea.

== History ==
Barwon Health was founded as a regional health service provider in 1998 following the amalgamation of the five following service providers:

- Geelong Hospital (now University Hospital Geelong)
- Grace McKellar Centre (now named McKellar Centre)
- Surf Coast Community Health Centre (Torquay and Anglesea)
- Geelong Community Health Centre
- Corio Community Health Centre
