= Helloworld Travel =

Australian-based travel agency

- Formerly: Helloworld
- Type: Publicly listed
- Industry: Travel
- Founded: 17 January 2000
- Headquarters: Sydney, Australia
- Number of locations: (2018)
- Area served: Australia, New Zealand, South Pacific, US, Asia.
- Key people: Andrew Burnes (CEO and Managing Director)
- Products: Hotels; Resorts; Air travel; Experiential Travel; River cruise; Cruise ship; Coach Tours
- Parent: Helloworld Travel Limited
- Website: helloworld.com.au

Helloworld Travel is an Australian-based travel agency specialising in Retail, Corporate and Wholesale travel products and packages. Helloworld Travel is the retail travel business of Helloworld Travel Limited (HLO), with fully branded travel agencies and associate agents located throughout Australia and New Zealand.

== History ==
Helloworld Travel, previously known as "Helloworld", began in 2013 when a group of franchised travel agencies based in Australia, the Jetset Travelworld Group (JTG), which included the travel agency brands Harvey World Travel, Travelscene, Jetset and Travelworld, rebranded under a new name, as part of a major overhaul that also included JTG being rebranded as Helloworld Ltd. It has since expanded to over 500 agencies throughout Australia, New Zealand and South Africa.

In 2017 it rebranded its agencies as Helloworld Travel in Australia and New Zealand The original brand remains in use in South Africa.

Harvey World Travel was one of the oldest travel agencies in Australia, having opened its first office in Cronulla in 1951.

The organization has been through a series of mergers and acquisitions in recent history, amalgamating existing organizations within its parent company Helloworld Travel Limited.

During the re-brand, the size of the network decreased by 9 percent in 2014 and 2 percent in 2015 due to franchisees being unhappy with the decision.

== Controversies ==
In February 2019 media reports revealed that Helloworld had paid for Australian Finance Minister Mathias Cormann's flights for a family holiday to Singapore in 2017, within weeks of two Helloworld subsidiaries being awarded contracts to arrange around AUD$1 billion worth of airline and hotel bookings for the Australian government over three years. Reports further revealed that the Australian Ambassador to the US, Joe Hockey, had in April 2017 told Washington embassy staff to meet with an executive from Helloworld. Shortly afterwards, an email from former Helloworld executive Russell Carstensen was tabled in the Australian Senate. The email stated that Helloworld CEO, Andrew Burnes, told him he was able to arrange a meeting on very short notice because Hockey 'owes' him.

The Senate was also told that the senior Finance department official in charge of negotiating a new contract with Helloworld, John Sheridan, was moved from his role in July 2017, after Burnes had complained to Senator Cormann and then to the Finance Department head about Sheridan's team's emphasis on savings from the travel contract. Burnes is Treasurer of, and a significant donor to, the Liberal Party of Australia, Hockey and Cormann's party.

== Operations ==
Helloworld Travel has more than 2,000 travel agents in its retail network around Australia and New Zealand. As at 30 June 2018, the retail network had 2,223 members in Australia and New Zealand.

Helloworld Travel uses a franchise model, whereby franchisees are running their own small to medium businesses looking after their own business leasing, staffing, community marketing, and brand marketing.

=== Australian Retail Operations ===
In Australia, the Helloworld Travel network consists of fully branded franchise outlets, Associates, Helloworld Business Travel, Magellan Travel, MTA, and My Travel Group.

Helloworld Travel is a member of the Franchise Council of Australia, and one of only two travel networks registered in Australia. With franchisees and independent affiliated travel agents, it is the largest independent agent network in Australia.

=== New Zealand Retail Operations ===
helloworld NZ Travel Agencies brand

In New Zealand, the Helloworld network has not changed its branding alongside the Australian operations and remains as HelloWorld. The network is made up of fully branded outlets, My Travel Group and The Travel Brokers.

== Television series ==
In 2018, Helloworld Travel Limited produced and launched the travel television series Helloworld in conjunction with the Nine Network Australia. The series promotes the Helloworld Travel retail network and its agents, through deals featured that are exclusive to the network.

In October 2019, the television series moved across to the Seven Network.

== Awards and recognition ==
2014 - Best Travel Agency Group, Australian Federation of Travel Agents (AFTA) National Travel Industry Awards (NTIA)

2016 - Best Travel Agency Group, Australian Federation of Travel Agents (AFTA) National Travel Industry Awards (NTIA)

2017 - Best Travel Agency Group, Australian Federation of Travel Agents (AFTA) National Travel Industry Awards (NTIA)

2018 - Best Travel Agency Brand, Travel Agents Association of New Zealand (TAANZ) National Travel Industry Awards (NTIA)

== See also ==
- Flight Centre
- STA Travel
