= Denis Walter =

Australian radio and TV announcer

- Born: Denis Clive Walter; 3 January 1955 (age 71); Geelong, Victoria, Australia
- Occupations: TV & Radio presenter Singer
- Years active: 1972−present
- Website: Official Denis Walter website

Denis Clive Walter OAM, (born 3 January 1955) is an Australian radio presenter, baritone singer, recording artist and media personality who also presented television news for 16 years.

== Career ==
Walter's music career has lasted over forty years and he has recorded 16 albums to date.

For 16 years until his final bulletin in November 2008 when he left to join Melbourne radio station 3AW full-time, Walter was a news presenter in regional Victoria for WIN Television (a former affiliate of the Nine Network). He has also hosted nightly televised Keno lottery draws and having presented the weather on Nine News in Melbourne earlier in his career, returned for a few weeks in December 2008/January 2009 to fill in for Livinia Nixon.

On 10 November 2008, Walter began hosting Afternoons on 3AW (693 AM) Melbourne, replacing Ernie Sigley who retired. Walter regularly performs at concerts throughout Victoria.

In August 2018, Walter was announced as a host on the Nine Network's travel series Helloworld, appearing on the first series.

In December 2019, 3AW announced that he will move to a new timeslot in 2020 as the host of a new local program, 3AW Nights replacing John Stanley. Dee Dee Dunleavy was announced as Walter’s replacement. He is on a 3-year contract in this role, extendable for a further 3 years. Obsessed with the quiz show “Sale of the Century”, Walter auditioned for the vacant host role a record 19 times.

== Community work ==
Walter is a patron for Cystic Fibrosis Australia, an ambassador for Dementia Australia, the Austin Hospital, Melbourne, Make A Wish Foundation (South West Victoria) and Barwon Health and also does work for the Neuroscience Foundation and a number of other charitable and community groups.

Walter is also the Patron for Samoyed Club of Victoria. Denis also hosts the Carols By Candlelight in Dandenong every year. Each year Walter hosts Carols by the Bay at Eastern Beach on the Geelong waterfront, a Christmas concert. He is also a long-standing performer since 1979 at Vision Australia's traditional Christmas Eve Carols by Candlelight event in Melbourne.

== Honours ==
Walter was awarded an Order of Australia Medal in the 2015 Queen's Birthday Honours list "for service to the performing arts as a singer and entertainer, and to the broadcast media."

== Personal life ==
Walter is married with two stepdaughters and two grandsons. He currently lives in Geelong.

== Discography ==
=== Albums ===
List of albums, with selected details and chart positions
Title	Album details	Peak chart positions
Title	Album details	AUS
The Incredible Voice of Denis Walter	Released: 1973; Label: L&Y (L-25042)	—
Denis Walter by Request	Released: 1974; Label: Festival (L 35286)	—
Collections of Denis Walter	Released: April 1977; Label: Pisces (L 101)	66
Sometimes When We Touch	Released: 1979; Label: Hammard (HAM 037)	—
No Limits	Released: 1981; Label: RCA Victor (VPL1 0336)	—
Tell It on the Mountain	Released: 1989; Label: J & B (JB385)	—
Songs of Faith (with John MacNally)	Released: 1990; Label: J & B Records (JB429)	89
Through the Years	Released: 1992; Label: Columbia (471628 2)	11
What Kind of Love	Released: 1993; Label: Columbia (474795 2)	—
The Magic of Christmas	Released: 1998; Label: Fable	—
Songs from a Southern Land Vol. 1	Released: September 2011; Label: Denis Walter	—
The Aussie Christmas Gift	Released: 2012; Label: Denis Walter	—
Yesterday Once More	Released: 22 April 2021; Label: Sony Music Australia; Producer: Michael Cristiano	—

- Note: According to Walter's website, as of 2020, he has released 16 albums, therefore, there are four missing from the table above.

Media offices
Preceded by originator	WIN News Victoria; Presenter; 1992–2008	Succeeded by Bruce Roberts
