= Helloworld (TV program) =

- Genre: Travel
- Presented by: Lauren Phillips; Giaan Rooney; Luke Nguyen; Eddie McGuire; Anthony Lehmann
- Country of origin: Australia
- No. of seasons: 3
- No. of episodes: 42

Production
- Running time: 30 minutes (including commercials)
- Production company: Helloworld

Original release
- Network: Nine Network
- Release: 7 October 2018 – March 2019
- Network: Seven Network
- Release: 13 October 2019 – March 2020
- Network: Nine Network
- Release: 3 November 2024 – present

Helloworld is an Australian travel and lifestyle television program. It is created through a partnership between Helloworld Travel Limited and the Nine Network. Helloworld is hosted by a group of Australian television personalities.

The series features both Australian and international locations, promoting tourist destinations around the world, and offering viewers access to special deals following each segment.

== History ==
=== Nine Network era (2018–19) ===
Logo for season 1, broadcast on the Nine Network

The first season premiered on 7 October 2018 on the Nine Network, which had initially partnered with Helloworld Travel to produce the series. The original presenters are Ray Martin, Denis Walter, Vince Sorrenti, Sonia Kruger, Steven Jacobs, Bec Hewitt, Lauren Phillips, Matt Wilson and Ashley Hart.

=== Seven Network era (2019–20) ===
In October 2019, it was announced that the second season will air in partnership with the Seven Network. Giaan Rooney joins the show as a presenter with Bec Hewitt, Ray Martin, Matt Wilson, Ashley Hart and Vince Sorrenti returning as presenters.

Due to the COVID-19 pandemic, the second series finished in March 2020.

=== Return to Nine Network (2024–present) ===
In October 2024, the third series that will return to Nine in partnership with Helloworld Travel with Luke Nguyen, Eddie McGuire and Anthony Lehmann are joining Giaan Rooney as the presenting team with returning presenter Lauren Phillips. The first episode broadcast on November 3rd, 2024.

== Presenters ==
=== Current ===
- Lauren Phillips (series 1, 3-present)
- Giaan Rooney (series 2-present)
- Luke Nguyen (series 3-present)
- Eddie McGuire (series 3-present)
- Anthony Lehmann (series 3-present)

=== Former ===
- Ashley Hart (series 1 & 2)
- Bec Hewitt (series 1 & 2)
- Matt Wilson (series 1 & 2)
- Ray Martin (series 1 & 2)
- Vince Sorrenti (series 1 & 2)
- Denis Walter (series 1)
- Sonia Kruger (series 1)
- Steven Jacobs (series 1)

== Series overview ==
Season	No. of episodes	Network	Season premiere	Season final
1	20	Nine Network	7 October 2018	March 2019
2	13	Seven Network	13 October 2019	March 2020
3	9	Nine Network	3 November 2024	29 December 2024

== See also ==
- Getaway
- Postcards
- Luxury Escapes
- List of Australian television series
