= Scott McRae =

Australian actor and TV host

- Occupation(s): Actor, TV host

Scott McRae is an Australian actor and TV host. McRae graduated from the Sydney Acting School in 1991 and soon got the role of James Newman on E Street, featuring on the series for two years. In 1993 he toured as Rum Tum Tugger in the musical Cats. after which he took over as host of Vidiot for the third season in 1994. In 1995-96 he played the lead in the stage adaptation of Lockie Leonard, Human Torpedo and in December 1995 he played Ned Kelly in the pantomime Santa Meets the Bushrangers. Hosting roles on Now You See It and Download followed. In 2011 he created the stage show Stevie: The Life and Music of Stevie Wright and The Easybeats with which he toured for many years.
