= Sofie Formica =

Australian television presenter

- Born: 29 June 1971 (age 55); Brisbane, Queensland, Australia
- Occupations: Radio host, TV host, actress
- Years active: 1985–present
- Spouse: Scott Wilkie
- Children: 3

Sofie Formica (born 29 June 1971, Brisbane, Queensland) is an Australian radio and television presenter and actress. She is best known for hosting Queensland-based lifestyle show The Great South East on the Seven Network from 1997 until 2016. Afternoons with Sofie Formica was launched on Brisbane radio station 4BC in October 2021.

== Career ==
Formica's television career commenced at age 14 on local Queensland school TV programs. In 1990, Sofie joined the cast of the award-winning Seven Network children's show Wombat; however, the show was axed that same year. Formica then hosted two children's programs: the Saturday morning program Saturday Disney (1990–1992) and the weekday program Now You See It (1991–1993) based on the US format Now You See It. In hosting Now You See It, she became the first woman to host a game show solo on Australian television. She was host of the comedy TV series Just Kidding (from 1994 until 1995), and was an original member of The Great Outdoors. After moving to the United States in the mid 1990s, she hosted technology-based programming in San Francisco for CNET during its Sunday morning run on USA Network in the mid-to-late '90s.

Formica appeared in several guest roles in TV serials, including featuring in Home and Away as the character Imogen Miller, cast in 10 episodes between 1992 and 1993. Formica also guest-starred on the American TV series Murder, She Wrote, Season 12, Episode 20, titled "Southern Double-Cross" as the character Linda Molen. She has had minor roles in the movies First Strike (1996) and San Andreas (2015).

In October 2021, Formica joined Brisbane radio station 4BC to host Afternoons with Sofie Formica.

In November 2025, Nine Radio announced that Formica will host Breakfast on 4BC with Dean Miller from January 2026.

== Personal life ==
On 31 December 1994, Formica married Scott Wilkie. They have three children and lived in the Brisbane suburb of Chelmer for almost ten years until 2016, then moved to St Lucia for the next five years.
