= 2003 PDL season =

USL Premier Development League
- Season: 2003
- Champions: Cape Cod Crusaders (2nd Title)
- Regular Season Champions: New Orleans Shell Shockers (1st Title)
- Matches: 436
- Goals: 1,701 (3.9 per match)
- Best player: (Czech Republic) Tomas Baltner Des Moines Menace
- Top goalscorer: (Zimbabwe) Joseph Ngwenya Cape Cod Crusaders, (Federal Republic of Yugoslavia) Bo Vuckovic Vermont Voltage (17 Goals Each)
- Best goalkeeper: (Republic of Ireland) John O'Hara Richmond Kickers Future

The 2003 USL Premier Development League season was the 9th PDL season. The season began in April 2003 and ended in August 2003.

Cape Cod Crusaders finished the season as national champions for the second time, beating Chicago Fire Reserves 2–0 in the PDL Championship game. New Orleans Shell Shockers finished with the best regular season record in the league, winning 16 out of their 18 games, suffering just 2 losses, and finishing with a +35 goal difference.

Cape Cod Crusaders striker Joseph Ngwenya and Vermont Voltage forward Bo Vuckovic were the league's top scorers, each knocking in 17 goals. Des Moines Menace midfielders Tomas Boltnar and Joseph Kabwe and Nashville Metros Ben Buerger led the league with 10 assists each, while Indiana Invaders keeper Christopher Sawyer enjoyed the best goalkeeping statistics, with a goals-against average of 0.287 per game, and Richmond Kickers Future keeper kept 7 clean sheets and had a GAA average of 0.568 in his 12 games.

== Changes from 2002 ==
=== New franchises ===
- Thirteen teams joined the league this year, including twelve brand new franchises:

Team name	Metro area	Location	Previous affiliation
(British Columbia) Abbotsford Rangers	Abbotsford area	Abbotsford, BC	expansion
(New York (state)) Albany Blackwatch Highlanders	Albany area	Schenectady, NY	expansion
(Utah) BYU Cougars	Provo area	Provo, UT	expansion
(Ohio) Columbus Shooting Stars	Columbus area	Columbus, OH	expansion
(Indiana) Fort Wayne Fever	Fort Wayne area	Fort Wayne, IN	expansion
(California) Fresno Fuego	Fresno area	Fresno, CA	expansion
(New Jersey) Jersey Shore Boca	Jersey Shore area	Toms River, NJ	expansion
Nevada Wonders	Carson City area	Carson City, NV	expansion
(Louisiana) New Orleans Shell Shockers	New Orleans area	New Orleans, LA	expansion
(Missouri) St. Louis Strikers	St. Louis area	St. Louis, MO	expansion
(New Jersey) South Jersey Barons	Greater Trenton area	Trenton, NJ	previously in D3 Pro
(Ohio) Toledo Slayers	Toledo area	Maumee, OH	expansion
West Virginia Chaos	Charleston area	Charleston, WV	expansion

=== Folding ===
- Ten teams left the league prior to the beginning of the season:
  - Central Coast Roadrunners - San Luis Obispo, California
  - Chicago Eagles Select - Chicago, Illinois
  - Chico Rooks - Chico, California (left to join the newly formed National Premier Soccer League)
  - Dayton Gemini - Dayton, Ohio
  - Denver Cougars - Commerce City, Colorado
  - Los Angeles Heroes - Los Angeles, California
  - Santa Barbara Sharks - Santa Barbara, California (folded during the 2002 season)
  - Seattle Sounders Select - Seattle, Washington (folded during the 2002 season)
  - Tampa Bay Hawks - Tampa, Florida
  - West Michigan Edge - Grand Rapids, Michigan (spending season on hiatus)

== Standings ==
Legend
Division champion
Team qualified for playoff berth

=== Central Conference ===
==== Great Lakes Division ====
Pos	Team	Pld	W	L	T	GF	GA	GD	Pts
1	Mid-Michigan Bucks	18	14	3	1	40	16	+24	43
2	Indiana Invaders	18	11	5	2	31	19	+12	35
3	Fort Wayne Fever	18	9	7	2	32	30	+2	29
4	Kalamazoo Kingdom	18	6	9	3	29	39	−10	21
5	Toledo Slayers	18	2	13	3	22	45	−23	9
6	Columbus Shooting Stars	18	2	14	2	28	43	−15	8

==== Heartland Division ====
Pos	Team	Pld	W	L	T	GF	GA	GD	Pts
1	Chicago Fire Reserves	18	15	2	1	60	17	+43	46
2	Des Moines Menace	18	12	5	1	48	23	+25	37
3	Thunder Bay Chill	18	10	7	1	34	31	+3	31
4	Boulder Rapids Reserve	18	10	7	1	32	29	+3	31
5	Kansas City Brass	18	7	11	0	35	48	−13	21
6	St. Louis Strikers	18	7	11	0	39	53	−14	21
7	Sioux Falls Spitfire	18	6	12	0	42	48	−6	18
8	Wisconsin Rebels	18	0	17	1	11	71	−60	1

=== Eastern Conference ===
==== Mid Atlantic Division ====
Pos	Team	Pld	W	L	T	GF	GA	GD	Pts
1	Richmond Kickers Future	18	14	3	1	41	12	+29	43
2	Williamsburg Legacy	18	10	6	2	35	22	+13	32
3	Raleigh CASL Elite	18	8	8	2	22	23	−1	26
4	Chesapeake Dragons	18	7	10	1	19	32	−13	22
5	West Virginia Chaos	18	3	14	1	18	54	−36	10
6	Greenville Lions	18	3	13	2	23	41	−18	8 (Note: 3 points deducted)

==== Northeast Division ====
Pos	Team	Pld	W	L	T	GF	GA	GD	Pts
1	Vermont Voltage	18	12	3	3	37	21	+16	39
2	Cape Cod Crusaders	18	12	4	2	64	30	+34	38
3	Brooklyn Knights	18	11	4	3	46	26	+20	36
4	South Jersey Barons	18	11	6	1	62	31	+31	34
5	Rhode Island Stingrays	18	10	4	4	45	28	+17	34
6	Albany Blackwatch Highlanders	18	6	11	1	36	43	−7	19
7	Jersey Shore Boca *	12	4	8	0	23	44	−21	12
8	Jersey Falcons	18	3	14	1	31	85	−54	10
9	Worcester Kings	18	1	17	0	21	62	−41	−3 (Note: 6 points deducted)

=== Southern Conference ===
==== Mid South Division ====
Pos	Team	Pld	W	L	T	GF	GA	GD	Pts
1	New Orleans Shell Shockers (R)	18	16	2	0	53	18	+35	48
2	Memphis Express	18	11	5	2	48	25	+23	35
3	Nashville Metros	18	11	7	0	41	21	+20	33
4	Texas Spurs	18	10	7	1	44	28	+16	31
5	Austin Lightning	18	9	8	1	31	42	−11	28
6	Houston Toros	18	3	13	2	21	60	−39	11
7	Louisiana Outlaws	18	3	14	1	23	46	−23	10

(R) Regular Season Champions

==== Southeast Division ====
Pos	Team	Pld	W	L	T	GF	GA	GD	Pts
1	Cocoa Expos	14	8	3	3	36	27	+9	27
2	Central Florida Kraze	14	7	5	2	38	26	+12	23
3	Bradenton Academics	14	6	5	3	32	24	+8	21
4	Palm Beach Pumas	14	2	11	1	23	55	−32	6 (Note: 1 point deducted)

=== Western Conference ===
==== Northwest Division ====
Pos	Team	Pld	W	L	T	GF	GA	GD	Pts
1	Spokane Shadow	18	14	2	2	38	14	+24	44
2	Cascade Surge	18	11	5	2	32	27	+5	35
3	Yakima Reds	18	9	8	1	30	26	+4	28
4	Abbotsford Rangers *	15	4	11	0	21	33	−12	12
5	Calgary Storm Prospects *	15	2	12	1	14	31	−17	7

==== Southwest Division ====
Pos	Team	Pld	W	L	T	GF	GA	GD	Pts
1	Fresno Fuego	18	14	4	0	50	23	+27	42
2	Orange County Blue Star	18	14	4	0	52	29	+23	42
3	Southern California Seahorses	18	10	6	2	34	29	+5	32
4	BYU Cougars	18	2	15	1	21	52	−31	7
5	Nevada Wonders	18	1	15	2	13	51	−38	5

== Playoffs ==
Conference Semifinals
MA1	(Virginia) Richmond Kickers Future	0
NE2	(Massachusetts) Cape Cod Crusaders	4
Eastern Conference
NE1	Vermont Voltage	5
MA2	(Virginia) Williamsburg Legacy	2
MS1	(Louisiana) New Orleans Shell Shockers	4
SE2	Central Florida Kraze	1
Southern Conference
SE1	(Florida) Cocoa Expos	2
MS2	(Tennessee) Memphis Express	5
HL1	(Illinois) Chicago Fire Reserves	8
GL2	Indiana Invaders	0
Central Conference
GL1	Mid-Michigan Bucks	1
HL2	(Iowa) Des Moines Menace	0
SW1	(California) Fresno Fuego	1
NW1	(Washington (state)) Spokane Shadow	0
Western Conference
SW2	(California) Orange County Blue Star	2
NW2	(Oregon) Cascade Surge	1

Conference Finals
NE2	(Massachusetts) Cape Cod Crusaders	4
NE1	Vermont Voltage	2
MS1	(Louisiana) New Orleans Shell Shockers	0
MS2	(Tennessee) Memphis Express	2
HL1	(Illinois) Chicago Fire Reserves	2
GL1	Mid-Michigan Bucks	0
SW1	(California) Fresno Fuego	0
SW2	(California) Orange County Blue Star	2

National Semifinals
NE2	(Massachusetts) Cape Cod Crusaders	4
MS2	(Tennessee) Memphis Express	0
HL1	(Illinois) Chicago Fire Reserves	3
SW2	(California) Orange County Blue Star	1

PDL Championship Game
NE2	(Massachusetts) Cape Cod Crusaders	2
HL1	(Illinois) Chicago Fire Reserves	0

=== Conference semifinals ===
July 26, 2003
5:00 PM EDT

(Illinois) Chicago Fire Reserves	8–0	Indiana Invaders
Patrick Grange 3', 34'; Robert Mouw 6'; Jamal Drewry-Sutton 25', 40'; Kirk Harwat 60' (pen.), 76'; Tighe Dombrowski 83'	Report 1 Report 2

Hurley Field
Berkley, Michigan

July 26, 2003

(Virginia) Richmond Kickers Future	0–4	(Massachusetts) Cape Cod Crusaders
	Report 1 Report 2	68', 72' David Bulow; 77' Joseph Ngwenya; 89' Luke Vercollone

Collins-Perley Sports Complex
St. Albans, Vermont

July 26, 2003

(Tennessee) Memphis Express	5–2	(Florida) Cocoa Expos
Mariano Ilari-Bonfico 26'; Dayton O'Brien 38'; Michael Vogel 51'; Tony Kuhn 71'; Steven Medlock 79'	Report	13' Itayi Pondwa; 59' Matthew Gowan

George G. Westfeldt Facility
New Orleans, Louisiana

July 26, 2003

Vermont Voltage	5–2	(Virginia) Williamsburg Legacy
Geoff Thompson 49'; Bojan Vuckovic 56'; Oliver Ellsworth 71'; 78' (o.g.); Olivier Occean 89'	Report 1	6', 55' Carlos García

Collins-Perley Sports Complex
St. Albans, Vermont
Attendance: 1,461

July 26, 2003

Mid-Michigan Bucks	1–0	(Iowa) Des Moines Menace
Mychal Turpin 11'	Report 1Report 2

Hurley Field
Berkley, Michigan

July 26, 2003

(Louisiana) New Orleans Shell Shockers	4–1	Central Florida Kraze
Steven Pate 23'; Steve McAnespie 76'; Jeremy Judice 83', 90'	Report	23' Clifton Philip-Wales

George G. Westfeldt Facility
New Orleans, Louisiana

July 26, 2003

(California) Orange County Blue Star	2–1	(Oregon) Cascade Surge
Jon Spencer 27'; Drew McCarthy 74'	Report	29' Taylor McCool

Joe Albi Stadium
Spokane, Washington

July 26, 2003

(Washington (state)) Spokane Shadow	0–1	(California) Fresno Fuego
	Report	38' Jose Espindola

Joe Albi Stadium
Spokane, Washington
Attendance: 982

=== Conference Finals ===
July 27, 2003

(Louisiana) New Orleans Shell Shockers	0–2	(Tennessee) Memphis Express
	Report	14' Dayton O'Brien; 56' Mariano Ilari

George G. Westfeldt Facility
New Orleans, Louisiana

July 27, 2003

Mid-Michigan Bucks	0–2	(Illinois) Chicago Fire Reserves
	Report 1Report 2	15' (pen.) Kevin Wickart; 74' Robert Mouw

Hurley Field
Berkley, Michigan

July 27, 2003

Vermont Voltage	2–4	(Massachusetts) Cape Cod Crusaders
Olivier Occean 1'; Bojan Vuckovic 90'	Report 1 Report 2	49' Scott Palguta; 84' (pen.) Joseph Ngwenya; 79', 88' David Bulow

Collins-Perley Sports Complex
St. Albans, Vermont
Attendance: 1,673

July 27, 2003

(California) Orange County Blue Star	2–0	(California) Fresno Fuego
Leonard Griffin 20'; Nick Theslof 23' (pen.)

Joe Albi Stadium
Spokane, Washington

=== National Semifinals ===
August 2, 2003
7:30 PM

(Massachusetts) Cape Cod Crusaders	4–0	(Tennessee) Memphis Express
David Bulow 1'; Ian Pilarski 14'; Damien Quinn 33'; Marty McNutt 50'	Report

Dennis Yarmouth High School
South Yarmouth, Massachusetts
Attendance: 1,238

August 2, 2003

(Illinois) Chicago Fire Reserves	3–1	(California) Orange County Blue Star
Jamal Sutton 3', 63'; Christopher Rolfe 87'	Report	35' (pen.) Nick Theslof

Pontiac Township High School
Pontiac, Illinois

=== PDL Championship Game ===
August 9, 2003
7:00 PM EDT

(Illinois) Chicago Fire Reserves	0–2	(Massachusetts) Cape Cod Crusaders
	Report 1 Report 2	16' (pen.) Joseph Ngwenya; 81' David Bulow

Cardinal Stadium
Naperville, Illinois
Attendance: 2,700

== Awards ==
=== Year End Awards ===
Scoring Champion: (Serbia) Bojan Vučković (Vermont Voltage) 39 Points (17 Goals, 5 Assists)
Golden Boot: (Serbia) Bojan Vučković (Vermont Voltage)
(Zimbabwe) Joseph Ngwenya (Cape Cod Crusaders) (17 Goals Each)
Assists Champion: (Czech Republic) Tomas Boltnar (Des Moines Menace)
(Zimbabwe) Joseph Kabwe (Des Moines Menace)
(United States) Ben Buerger (Nashville Metros) (10 Assists Each)
GAA Champion: (Republic of Ireland) John O'Hara (Richmond Kickers Future) 0.57 Goals Against
MVP: (Czech Republic) Tomas Boltnar (Des Moines Menace)
Rookie of the Year: (United States) Eric Vasquez (Central Florida Kraze)
Defender of the Year: (Mexico) Jose Luis Delgadillo (Fresno Fuego)
Goalkeeper of the Year: (Republic of Ireland) John O'Hara (Richmond Kickers Future)
Coach of the Year: (Republic of Ireland) Kenny Farrell (New Orleans Shell Shockers)

=== Weekly awards ===
Player of the Week
Week	Player	Club	Position	Reason	Ref.
3	(Brazil) Indalecio "Zico" Antunes-Silva	Rhode Island Stingrays	Forward	Hat Trick at South Jersey Barons	
4	(United States) David Bulow	Cape Cod Crusaders	Forward	4 goals, 1 assist vs Jersey	
5	(Liberia) Doco Wesseh	Thunder Bay Chill	Forward	3 goals in pair of wins at Wisconsin Rebels	
6	(United States) Kenny Uzoigwe	Toledo Slayers	Forward	4 goals in 5-3 win over West Michigan Edge	
7	(United States) David Bulow	Cape Cod Crusaders	Forward	4 goals in two wins and draw	
8	(United States) Haven Bruce	Greenville Lions	Forward	5 goals in 4-3 win and 3-2 loss	
9	(United States) Matt Clark	Texas Spurs	Midfielder	5 goals, 1 assist in 6-1 win over Austin Lightning	
10	(United States) Jake Ward	Southern California Seahorses	Defender	Solid play in 2-1 win over Fresno Fuego	
11	(Liberia) Doco Wesseh	Thunder Bay Chill	Midfielder	2 goals, 1 assist in 5-4 OT win at Sioux Falls Spitfire	
12	(Zimbabwe) Joseph Kabwe	Des Moines Menace	Forward	5 goals, 1 assist in 8-2 win over Kansas City Brass	
13	(United States) Ben Buerger	Nashville Metros	Midfielder	1 Goal, 4 assists in wins over Memphis Express, St. Louis Strikers	
14	(United States) Ricky Francis	Indiana Invaders	Midfielder	2 goals, 2 assists in wins over Columbus Shooting Stars, Toledo Slayers	

Team of the Week
Week	Goalkeeper	Defenders	Midfielders	Forwards	Ref.
3	(United States) Mahoney (RIS)	(United States) Sullivan (BRK) (Australia) McGowan (JER) (United States) Ericson-Neilson (NOS)	(Poland) Gula (JER) (United States) Poltl (OCBS) (United States) Gutierrez (FRE) (Republic of Ireland) Murray (NAS)	(Brazil) Antunes (RIS) (United States) Ramirez (FRE) (United States) Garcia (IND)	
4	(England) Rowe (NEV)	(United States) Branch (RAL) (United States) Anderson (SPK) (England) Luya (KAL)	(Republic of Ireland) Murray (NAS) (United States) Ryan (KCB) (United States) Suhm (YAK) (Federal Republic of Yugoslavia) Vučković (VER)	(United States) Bulow (CCC) (United States) Perkins (KCB) (United States) McElligott (CHE)	
5	(United States) Pogue (TOL)	(United States) Redhage (DMM) (United States) Parkhurst (BRA) (Zimbabwe) Ncube (CCC)	(United States) Mouw (CHI) (United States) Gula (JER) (United States) Evans (SCS) (United States) Curley (CAS)	(United States) Thomas (WIL) (Liberia) Wesseh (TBC) (United States) Coiner (OCBS)	
6	(United States) Graham (BRA)	(United States) Gorton (TBC) (United States) Photivihok (NAS) (United States) Newland (SFS)	(Mexico) Camarena (CAS) (United States) Jones (DMM) (United States) Thelen (RIC) (United States) Petrarca (RIS)	(Honduras) Lopez (NOS) (United States) Uzoigwe (TOL) (United States) Mankowski (PBP)	
7	(United States) Dzubay (MMB)	(United States) Tanner (CHI) (United States) Gibson (TXS) (United States) Mackey (CFK)	(United States) Evans (SCS) (United States) Chevalier (ABH) (United States) Cameron (MMB) (United States) Sanchez (CAS)	(United States) Bulow (CCC) (El Salvador) Garrity (CAL) (United States) Atkinson (COE)	
8	(United States) Sanders (WME)	(United States) Wagenfuhr (BRR) (United States) Buehler (RAL) (United States) Bryant (WME)	(Zimbabwe) Chisoni (COE) (United States) Wickart (CHI) (United States) Barber (COL) (Puerto Rico) Garay (RIC)	(United States) Bruce (GVL) (United States) Kuska (SPK) (United States) Hotchkin (SCS)	
9	(United States) Pickens (CHI)	(United States) Lampert (BRR) (Canada) Peetoom (ABB) (United States) Hare (RIC) (United States) Clark (TXS)	(United States) Odwell (CHI) (United States) Sulkin (FWF) (United States) Vasquez (CFK)	(United States) Smart (BRK) (Bulgaria) Bogdanov (SFS) (United States) Auckland (YAK)	
10	(United States) Leon (ABB)	(United States) Ward (SCS) (United States) Shinaberger (FWF) (United States) Pearce (BRA)	(Mexico) Camarena (CAS) (United States) DeVall (NAS) (United States) Dombrowski (CHI) (United States) Chevalier (ABH)	(Liberia) Quattrocchi (STL) (Morocco) Omekanda (MMB) (United States) Bulow (CCC)	
11	(Republic of Ireland) O'Hara (RIC)	(United States) Lawson (OCBS) (United States) Buck (FWF) (United States) Hinkle (WIL)	(Cape Verde) Brito (RIS) (Liberia) Wesseh (TBC) (United States) Porto (FWF) (United States) Skeels (WME)	(United States) Hotchkin (SCS) (United States) Phillip (CFK) (New Zealand) Smith (BRR)	
12	(Greece) Hiebert (NOS)	(United States) Clanton (CHI) (United States) Kos (CAS) (Romania) Neagu (RIC) (United States) Umana (WIL)	(United States) Grabavoy (CHI) (United States) Vasquez (CFK) (Federal Republic of Yugoslavia) Vučković (VER) (United States) Francis (IND)	(Zimbabwe) Kabwe (DMM) (United States) Mabee (ABH)	
13	(Republic of Ireland) O'Hara (RIC)	(United States) Fortes (RIS) (United States) Sullivan (BRK) (United States) Schwartz (FWF)	(United States) Buerger (NAS) (Trinidad and Tobago) Fitzpatrick (COL) (United States) Ambrose (TXS) (United States) Harwatt (CHI)	(Liberia) Wesseh (TBC) (United States) Cummings (SPK) (United States) Hotchkin (SCS)	
14	(United States) Wiese (MMB)	(Nigeria) Ihekoronye (CAS) (United States) Brazeau (DMM) (Venezuela) Uriarte (AUS)	(United States) Francis (IND) (Federal Republic of Yugoslavia) Simic (VER) (United States) Cila (BRK) (United States) Pilarski (CCC)	(Brazil) Antunes (RIS) (Kenya) Wakhisi (IND) (Zimbabwe) Ngwenya (CCC)	

== All-League and All- Conference Teams ==
=== Central Conference ===
F: (United States) Jake Bleyenberg (KCB), (United States) Kenny Uzoigwe (TOL), (Liberia) Doco Wesseh (TBC)*
M: (United States) Knox Cameron (MMB), (Czech Republic) Tomas Boltnar (DMM)*, (United States) Tighe Dombrowski (CHI), (United States) Ned Grabavoy (CHI)
D: (United States) Denny Clanton (CHI)*, (United States) Danny Crew (COL), (United States) Erik Nelson (MMB)
G: (United States) Matt Pickens (CHI)

=== Eastern Conference ===
F: (Brazil) Zico Antunes (RIS)*, (United States) David Bulow (CCC), (Zimbabwe) Joseph Ngwenya (CCC)
M: (United States) Graham Albert (WIL), (United States) Greg Chevalier (ABH)*, (United States) Clyde Simms (RAL), (Serbia) Bojan Vučković (VER)*
D: (Romania) Cristian Neagu (RIC), (United States) Gary Sullivan (BRO), (Portugal) Valdemar Texeira (RIS),
G: (Republic of Ireland) John O'Hara (RIC)*

=== Southern Conference ===
F: (United States) Matt Clark (TXS), (Zimbabwe) Mubarike Chisoni (COA), (United States) Dayton O'Brien (MEM)
M: (Republic of Ireland) Stephen Murray (NAS), (United States) Stephen Pate (NOS), (Venezuela) Marcelino Uriarte (AUS), (United States) Eric Vasquez (CFK)*
D: (United States) Danny Collins (COA), (United States) Thomas McCallum (NAS), (Republic of Ireland) Ross McLynn (MEM)*,
G: (United States) Daryl Sattler (NAS)

=== Western Conference ===
F: (United States) Edgardo Contreras (FRE), (United States) Jason Hotchkin (SCS)*, (United States) Jason Kuska (SPK)
M: (Mexico) Miguel Camarena (CAS), (United States) Paul Johnson (SPK), (United States) Tom Poltl (OCBS), (United States) Matt Taylor (OCBS)
D: (Mexico) Jose Luis Delgadillo (FRE)*, (United States) Leonard Griffin (OCBS), (United States) Jacob Ward (SCS),
G: (United States) Shaun Kalnasy (SPK)

* denotes All-League selection

=== All-League Team ===
F: (United States) Jason Hotchkin (SCS), (Liberia) Doco Wesseh (TBC), (Brazil) Zico Antunes (RIS)
M: (Czech Republic) Tomas Boltnar (DMM) (League MVP), (Serbia) Bojan Vučković (VER) (Scoring Champion and Co-Golden Boot), (United States) Eric Vasquez (CFK) (Rookie of the Year), (United States) Greg Chevalier (ABH)
D: (Mexico) Jose Luis Delgadillo (FRE) (Defender of the Year), (United States) Denny Clanton (CHI), (Republic of Ireland) Ross McLynn (MEM)
G: (Republic of Ireland) John O'Hara (RIC) (Goalkeeper of the Year and GAA Champion)
