= 2002 PDL season =

Soccer league season

USL Premier Development League
- Season: 2002
- Champions: Cape Cod Crusaders (1st Title)
- Regular Season Champions: Des Moines Menace (1st Title)
- Matches: 419
- Goals: 1,666 (3.98 per match)
- Best Player: (Czech Republic) Tomas Boltnar Des Moines Menace
- Top goalscorer: (Czech Republic) Tomas Boltnar Des Moines Menace (24 Goals)
- Best goalkeeper: (United States) Matt Pickens Chicago Fire Reserves

The 2002 USL Premier Development League season was the 8th PDL season. The season began in April 2002 and ended in August 2002.

Cape Cod Crusaders finished the season as national champions, beating Boulder Rapids Reserve 2–1 in the PDL Championship game. Des Moines Menace finished with the best regular season record in the league, winning 15 out of their 18 games, suffering no losses, and finishing with a +49 goal difference.

== Changes from 2001 ==
=== Name changes ===
- Boulder Nova became Boulder Rapids Reserve
- Lafayette Lightning became Austin Lightning
- San Fernando Valley Heroes became Los Angeles Heroes

=== New franchises ===
- Twelve teams joined the league this year, including eight brand new franchises:

Team name	Metro area	Location	Previous affiliation
(Alberta) Calgary Storm Select	Calgary area	Calgary, Alberta	expansion
(California) Chico Rooks	northern Sacramento Valley area	Chico, CA	previously in D3 Pro
(Texas) Houston Toros	Houston area	Houston, TX	expansion
(Tennessee) Memphis Express	Memphis area	Memphis, TN	expansion
(Tennessee) Nashville Metros	Nashville area	Nashville, TN	previously in A-League
(North Carolina) Raleigh CASL Elite	Raleigh area	Cary, NC	expansion
Rhode Island Stingrays	Providence area	East Providence, RI	previously in D3 Pro
(Virginia) Richmond Kickers Future	Richmond area	Richmond, VA	expansion
(California) Santa Barbara Sharks	Santa Barbara area	Santa Barbara, CA	expansion
(Virginia) Williamsburg Legacy	Williamsburg area	Williamsburg, VA	expansion
Wisconsin Rebels	Fox River Valley area	Menasha, WI	returned from hiatus
(Massachusetts) Worcester Kings	Worcester area	Worcester, MA	expansion

=== Promoted ===
- The Calgary Storm were promoted to the A-League.
- The New York Freedom and Westchester Flames were promoted to USL Pro Select.

=== Folding ===
- Eight teams left the league prior to the beginning of the season:
  - Colorado Springs Ascent - Colorado Springs, Colorado
  - Miami Strike Force - Miami, Florida
  - North Jersey Imperials - Paramus, New Jersey
  - Okanagan Predators - Kelowna, British Columbia
  - San Gabriel Valley Highlanders - Glendale, California
  - Twin Cities Phoenix - Edina, Minnesota
  - West Dallas Kings - Dallas, Texas
  - Wichita Jets - Wichita, Kansas

== Standings ==
Legend
Division champion
Team qualified for playoff berth
Team folded during the season

=== Central Conference ===
==== Great Lakes Division ====
Pos	Team	Pld	W	L	T	GF	GA	GD	BP	Pts
1	Chicago Fire Reserves	18	14	3	1	43	15	+28	7	64
2	Mid-Michigan Bucks	18	11	5	2	48	36	+12	9	55
3	West Michigan Edge	18	11	6	1	49	28	+21	8	53
4	Kalamazoo Kingdom	18	9	8	1	37	32	+5	6	43
5	Indiana Invaders	18	8	7	3	32	25	+7	5	40
6	Dayton Gemini	18	3	12	3	26	48	−22	3	18

==== Heartland Division ====
Pos	Team	Pld	W	L	T	GF	GA	GD	BP	Pts
1	Des Moines Menace (R)	18	15	0	3	68	19	+49	11	74
2	Boulder Rapids Reserve	18	11	3	4	49	23	+26	6	54
3	Sioux Falls Spitfire	18	9	6	3	34	33	+1	6	45
4	Chicago Eagles Select	18	6	11	1	37	38	−1	5	30
5	Kansas City Brass	18	5	12	1	39	56	−17	6	27
6	Thunder Bay Chill	18	5	12	1	35	58	−23	5	26
7	Denver Cougars	18	4	9	5	25	45	−20	3	24
8	Wisconsin Rebels	18	1	17	0	11	76	−65	0	4

(R) Regular Season Champions

=== Eastern Conference ===
==== Mid Atlantic Division ====
Pos	Team	Pld	W	L	T	GF	GA	GD	BP	Pts
1	Williamsburg Legacy	18	14	4	0	44	26	+18	9	65
2	Raleigh CASL Elite	18	11	7	0	42	35	+7	7	51
3	Richmond Kickers Future	18	9	9	0	40	37	+3	4	40
4	Chesapeake Dragons	18	5	13	0	27	44	−17	4	24
5	Greenville Lions	18	4	14	0	22	57	−35	4	20

==== Northeast Division ====
Pos	Team	Pld	W	L	T	GF	GA	GD	BP	Pts
1	Vermont Voltage	18	14	2	2	48	18	+30	8	66
2	Cape Cod Crusaders	18	12	4	2	39	17	+22	8	58
3	Rhode Island Stingrays	18	8	9	1	38	38	0	7	40
4	Worcester Kings	18	6	12	0	29	51	−22	4	28
5	Brooklyn Knights	18	6	12	0	23	36	−13	3	27
6	Jersey Falcons	18	5	12	1	25	42	−17	2	23

=== Southern Conference ===
==== Mid South Division ====
Pos	Team	Pld	W	L	T	GF	GA	GD	BP	Pts
1	Memphis Express	18	12	4	2	45	19	+26	10	60
2	Texas Spurs	18	12	6	0	48	30	+18	8	56
3	Austin Lightning	18	8	8	2	36	42	−6	6	40
4	Nashville Metros	18	7	9	2	37	34	+3	6	36
5	Louisiana Outlaws	18	5	12	1	39	38	+1	7	28
6	Houston Toros	18	4	13	1	27	60	−33	2	19

==== Southeast Division ====
Pos	Team	Pld	W	L	T	GF	GA	GD	BP	Pts
1	Tampa Bay Hawks	18	14	4	0	51	27	+24	8	64
2	Bradenton Academics	18	10	7	1	43	31	+12	7	48
3	Central Florida Kraze	18	9	8	1	34	33	+1	6	43
4	Palm Beach Pumas	18	7	11	0	32	42	−10	5	33
5	Cocoa Expos	18	4	13	1	35	61	−26	7	24

=== Western Conference ===
==== Northwest Division ====
Pos	Team	Pld	W	L	T	GF	GA	GD	BP	Pts
1	Spokane Shadow	18	11	6	1	39	23	+16	8	53
2	Cascade Surge	18	9	9	0	31	32	−1	4	40
3	Calgary Storm Select	18	5	10	3	21	44	−23	2	25
4	Yakima Reds	18	5	11	2	30	33	−3	5	27
5	Seattle Sounders Select	14	9	3	2	33	22	+11	4	42 (Note: Folded during the season)

==== Southwest Division ====
Pos	Team	Pld	W	L	T	GF	GA	GD	BP	Pts
1	Chico Rooks	18	13	4	1	40	22	+18	8	61
2	Southern California Seahorses	18	11	7	0	43	28	+15	6	50
3	Orange County Blue Star	18	7	9	2	29	26	+3	5	35
4	Los Angeles Heroes	18	6	10	2	24	38	−14	4	30
5	Central Coast Roadrunners	18	5	13	0	19	37	−18	3	23
6	Santa Barbara Sharks	13	3	10	0	20	37	−17	3	15 (Note: Folded during the season)

== Playoffs ==
Conference Semifinals
MA1	(Virginia) Williamsburg Legacy	0
NE2	(Massachusetts) Cape Cod Crusaders	2
Eastern Conference
NE1	Vermont Voltage	0
MA2	(North Carolina) Raleigh CASL Elite	1
MS1	(Tennessee) Memphis Express	0
SE2	(Florida) Bradenton Academics	1
Southern Conference
SE1	(Florida) Tampa Bay Hawks	4
MS2	Texas Spurs	2
HL1	(Iowa) Des Moines Menace	1
GL2	Mid-Michigan Bucks	3
Central Conference
GL1	(Illinois) Chicago Fire Reserves	1
HL2	(Colorado) Boulder Rapids Reserve	3
SW1	(California) Chico Rooks	0
NW2	(Oregon) Cascade Surge	1
Western Conference
NW1	(Washington (state)) Spokane Shadow	0
SW2	Southern California Seahorses	2

Conference Finals
NE2	(Massachusetts) Cape Cod Crusaders	1
MA2	(North Carolina) Raleigh CASL Elite	0
SE2	(Florida) Bradenton Academics	3
SE1	(Florida) Tampa Bay Hawks	2
GL2	Mid-Michigan Bucks	0 (6)
HL2	(Colorado) Boulder Rapids Reserve	0 (7)
NW2	(Oregon) Cascade Surge	2
SW2	Southern California Seahorses	3

National Semifinals
NE2	(Massachusetts) Cape Cod Crusaders	3
SE2	(Florida) Bradenton Academics	2
HL2	(Colorado) Boulder Rapids Reserve	2
SW2	Southern California Seahorses	1

PDL Championship Game
NE2	(Massachusetts) Cape Cod Crusaders	2
HL2	(Colorado) Boulder Rapids Reserve	1

=== Conference semifinals ===
July 26, 2002
5:30 PM CDT

(Illinois) Chicago Fire Reserves	1–3	(Colorado) Boulder Rapids Reserve
5'		Nat Borchers; Nate Jaqua

Cara McGrane Memorial Stadium
Des Moines, Iowa

July 26, 2002
6:00 PM CDT

(Florida) Tampa Bay Hawks	4–2	Texas Spurs
Sven Avdi

Mike Rose Soccer Complex
Memphis, Tennessee

July 26, 2002
8:00 PM CDT

(Iowa) Des Moines Menace	1–3	Mid-Michigan Bucks
Nicholas Benjamin 78'	Report	22', 66' Pat Noonan; 69' Ryan Mack

Cara McGrane Memorial Stadium
Des Moines, Iowa
Attendance: 3,374

July 26, 2002
8:00 PM CDT

(Tennessee) Memphis Express	0–1 (OT)	(Florida) Bradenton Academics
Mark Franklin (yellow card) (yellow-red card) 71'		103' Vitor Moreira

Mike Rose Soccer Complex
Memphis, Tennessee

July 27, 2002
5:00 PM EDT

(Virginia) Williamsburg Legacy	0–2	(Massachusetts) Cape Cod Crusaders
	Report	49' Scott Palguta; 89' Nicola Chicco

Collins-Perley Sports Complex
St. Albans, Vermont

July 27, 2002
7:30 PM EDT

Vermont Voltage	0–1	(North Carolina) Raleigh CASL Elite
	Report	(89:30) Ryan Kniepper

Collins-Perley Sports Complex
St. Albans, Vermont
Attendance: 1,674

July 27, 2002
6:00 PM PDT

(California) Chico Rooks	0–1	(Oregon) Cascade Surge
		48' Patrick Daka

Joe Albi Stadium
Spokane, Washington

July 27, 2002
8:00 PM PDT

(Washington (state)) Spokane Shadow	0–2	Southern California Seahorses
	Report	58' Matt Evans; 72' Ben Bingham

Joe Albi Stadium
Spokane, Washington
Attendance: 1,276

=== Conference Finals ===
July 27, 2002
7:30 PM CDT

(Florida) Tampa Bay Hawks	2–3	(Florida) Bradenton Academics
		Heath Pearce

Mike Rose Soccer Complex
Memphis, Tennessee

July 27, 2002
7:30 PM CDT

Mid-Michigan Bucks	0–0 (a.e.t.)	(Colorado) Boulder Rapids Reserve
	Report
Penalties
Penalty scored Penalty missed	6–7	(penalty scored) Justin Lowder

Cara McGrane Memorial Stadium
Des Moines, Iowa
Attendance: 3,545

July 28, 2002
7:00 PM EDT

(Massachusetts) Cape Cod Crusaders	1–0	(North Carolina) Raleigh CASL Elite
Scott Palguta 64'	Report

Collins-Perley Sports Complex
St. Albans, Vermont

July 28, 2002
6:00 PM PDT

(Oregon) Cascade Surge	2–3	Southern California Seahorses
Patrick Daka 13'; Glenn Duerr 90'	Report	30', 87' Jason Hotchkin; 49' Jacob Ward

Joe Albi Stadium
Spokane, Washington

=== National Semifinals ===
August 3, 2002
5:00 PM EDT

(Florida) Bradenton Academics	2–3	(Massachusetts) Cape Cod Crusaders
Marco Velez 8'; Arthur Bartholomew 50'	Report	11' Eric Reed; 43' Bryan Harkin; 79' Casey Schmidt

IMG Academy
Bradenton, Florida

August 3, 2002
5:00 PM MDT

(Colorado) Boulder Rapids Reserve	5–1	Southern California Seahorses
Eric Cronkite		Randy Wilson

Pleasant View Soccer Field
Boulder, Colorado

=== PDL Championship Game ===
August 10, 2002
8:00 PM EDT

(Massachusetts) Cape Cod Crusaders	2–1 (OT)	(Colorado) Boulder Rapids Reserve
Eric Reed 58'; Casey Schmidt 99'	Report	74' Jason Thompson

Dennis Yarmouth High School
South Yarmouth, Massachusetts
Attendance: 2,239
