= 2004 USL Pro Soccer League =

USL Pro Soccer League
- Season: 2004
- Champions: Utah Blitzz (2nd Title)
- Premiers: Pittsburgh Riverhounds (1st Title)
- Matches: 120
- Goals: 423 (3.53 per match)
- Best Player: (United States) Jacob Coggins Charlotte Eagles
- Top goalscorer: (United States) Jacob Coggins Charlotte Eagles (20 Goals)
- Best goalkeeper: (United States) Eric Pattison Charlotte Eagles

The 2004 USL Pro Soccer League was the tenth season of the United Soccer Leagues operated competition. The league was sanctioned as Division III by the United States Soccer Federation.

== Divisions ==
=== Atlantic Division ===
Team	Pld	W	L	D	GF	GA	GD	Pts
Pittsburgh Riverhounds	20	17	2	1	48	17	+31	52
Harrisburg City Islanders	20	10	7	3	40	25	+15	33
Long Island Rough Riders	20	8	11	1	31	43	−12	25

=== Northern Division ===
Team	Pld	W	L	D	GF	GA	GD	Pts
New Hampshire Phantoms	20	10	9	1	46	33	+13	31
Westchester Flames	20	8	9	3	38	43	−5	27
Western Mass Pioneers	20	8	10	2	34	34	0	26

=== Southern Division ===
Team	Pld	W	L	D	GF	GA	GD	Pts
Charlotte Eagles	20	14	4	2	53	19	+34	44
Wilmington Hammerheads	19	10	6	3	32	20	+12	33
Northern Virginia Royals	19	3	16	0	18	64	−46	6 (Note: 3 points deducted?)

=== Western Division ===
Team	Pld	W	L	D	GF	GA	GD	Pts
Utah Blitzz	20	11	6	3	39	16	+23	36
San Diego Gauchos	20	9	9	2	26	41	−15	29
California Gold	20	2	13	5	18	46	−28	5 (Note: California was penalized 3 points for use of an ineligible player in a game. California was penalized another 3 points for a forfeit.)

== Playoffs ==
=== Atlantic Division Finals ===
August 20, 2004
7:35 PM EDT
First Leg

Harrisburg City Islanders	0–4	Pittsburgh Riverhounds
Moffat Oduor (yellow card) 23'; Mike Henning (yellow card) 45'	Report	5' David Flavius; 30' Greg Chevalier; 52' Matthew Chulis; 58' Dan Hartung; (yellow card) 77' Andrew Bragg

Skyline Sports Complex, Harrisburg, Pennsylvania
Attendance: 2,291
Referee: Stan Nagle

August 21, 2004
7:30 PM EDT
Second Leg

Pittsburgh Riverhounds	3–1	Harrisburg City Islanders
David Flavius 28'; Said Ali 32', 57'; Arnibal Armas (yellow card) 72'	Report	25' Andrew Guastaferro; (yellow card) 52' (yellow-red card) 64' Moffat Oduor; (yellow card) 57' Mike Henning

Moon Area High School, Moon Township, Pennsylvania
Attendance: 776
Referee: Jeffrey Mellen

Pittsburgh wins series 7-1 on aggregate

=== Southern Division Finals ===
August 20, 2004
7:30 PM EDT
First Leg

Wilmington Hammerheads	2–2	Charlotte Eagles
Christopher Bagley 25'; Brady Bryant (yellow card) 60'; Niel McNab (yellow card) 62'; Ryan Miller 70'; Juneval Zarate (yellow card) 88'	Report	(yellow card) 42' Benjamin Meek; 64' Jacob Coggins; (yellow card) 64' Jonah Long; 75' Jason Hotchkin

Legion Stadium, Wilmington, North Carolina
Attendance: 1,382
Referee: Abbas Piran

August 21, 2004
7:30 PM EDT
Second Leg

Charlotte Eagles	3–2	Wilmington Hammerheads
Jacob Coggins 23'; Patrick Daka 84'; Christopher Lemons 90'	Report	(yellow card) 12' Timothy Karalexis; (yellow card) 14' Christopher Bagley; (yellow card) 17' Joseph McNab; 39' (yellow card) 67' George Corrie; 53' Ryan Miller

Waddell Stadium, Charlotte, North Carolina
Attendance: 1,036
Referee: Roni Canales

Charlotte wins series 5-4 on aggregate

=== Western Division Final ===
August 20, 2004
9:30 PM EDT

Utah Blitzz	2–1	San Diego Gauchos
Matt Evans 9'; Jason Boyce 54'; Alejandro Gutierrez (yellow card) 55'; William Cummins (yellow card) 90'	Report	54' Herculez Gomez

Rice Eccles Stadium, Salt Lake City, Utah
Attendance: 4,789
Referee: Feliciano Palomino

=== Semi-finals ===
August 28, 2004
5:00 PM EDT

Utah Blitzz	1–0	Pittsburgh Riverhounds
Trevor Persson (yellow card) 12'; William Cummins (yellow card) 17' (yellow-red card) 69'; Byron Carmichael 50'	Report	(yellow card) 30' Gary Depalma; (yellow card) 90' Greg Chevalier

Rice Eccles Stadium, Salt Lake City, Utah
Attendance: 5,866
Referee: Yader Reyes
August 28, 2004
7:30 PM EDT

Charlotte Eagles	1–0	New Hampshire Phantoms
Jacob Coggins (yellow card) 12'; Patrick Daka 47'	Report	(yellow card) 49' Sean Carey; (yellow card) 69' Kieran O'Brien; (yellow card) 77' Richard Fleming; (yellow card) 79' Mark Manganello

Waddell Stadium, Charlotte, North Carolina
Attendance: 1,408
Referee: Charles Mitchell

=== Championship ===
USL Pro Soccer League Championship Game
September 4, 2004
7:00 PM EDT

Charlotte Eagles	2–2 (a.e.t.)	Utah Blitzz
Aaron Faro 40'; Patrick Daka 58'	Report	66' Richard Breza; 80' Byron Carmichael
Penalties
	4–5	(penalty missed) Jorge Estrada; (penalty scored) Luis Zamora

Waddell Stadium, Charlotte, North Carolina
Attendance: 3,034
