= 2012 USASA Region I National Cup =

Tournament details
- Country: United States
- Teams: 6

The 2012 USASA Region I National Cup will be a qualifying tournament to determine which clubs from the first region of the United States Adult Soccer Association will qualify for the first round proper of the 2012 U.S. Open Cup. The defending co-champions, New York Pancyprian-Freedoms and Phoenix SC both failed to qualify for the tournament, losing in their respective state/subregional tournaments.

Three teams from Region I will qualify for the U.S. Open Cup in April, with the finals held June 17 in Horsham, Pennsylvania. The winner will then qualify for the National Finals which will be July 20–22 in Chicago, Illinois.

== Qualification ==
Subregion	Tournament	Winner	Ref
Connecticut	2012 Connecticut Open Cup		
(New York (state)) Eastern New York	2012 Eastern New York Open Cup	Greek American AA	
Eastern Pennsylvania	2012 Eastern Pennsylvania Open Cup	West Chester United	
Maryland	2012 Maryland Open Cup	Maryland Bays	
Rhode Island	2012 Rhode Island Open Cup		
(Washington, D.C.) Virginia / Washington, D.C.	2012 Virginia / Washington, D.C. Open Cup	Aegean Hawks	

== Bracket ==
Quarterfinals
(New York (state))	Greek American AA	2
(Massachusetts)	Battery Park Gunners	0
(New Jersey)	Jersey Shore Boca
(Pennsylvania)	West Chester United	1
(Virginia)	Aegean Hawks	3
(Maryland)	Maryland Bays

Semifinals
(New York (state))	Greek American AA	2
(New Jersey)	Jersey Shore Boca	0
(Maryland)	Maryland Bays	0
(Virginia)	Aegean Hawks	2

Qualifiers
(New York (state))	Greek American AA
(Virginia)	Aegean Hawks
Third place
(New Jersey)	Jersey Shore Boca	WIN
(Maryland)	Maryland Bays	FFT

== Results ==
The semifinal winners, NY Greek American Atlas and Dulles Sportsplex Aegean Hawks, both qualified for the U.S. Open Cup and will meet in the finals in June. The winner of the third place game will also qualify for the Cup.

1st round

Battery Park Gunners (Mass.) 0–2 NY Greek American Atlas (East NY)

- West Chester United Predators (East PA) 1–3 Dulles Sportsplex Aegean Hawks (DC/VA)

Semifinals

- NY Greek American Atlas 2–0 Jersey Shore Boca
- Maryland Bays 0–2 Dulles Sportsplex Aegean Hawks

Third place

Maryland Bays vs. Jersey Shore Boca (Time/Location TBA)

== Advancing to Open Cup ==
- (New York (state)) Greek American AA
- (Virginia) Aegean Hawks
- (New Jersey) Jersey Shore Boca

== See also ==
- 2012 U.S. Open Cup
- 2012 U.S. Open Cup qualification
- United States Adult Soccer Association
