= ABC Radio Canberra =

666 ABC Canberra (2CN)

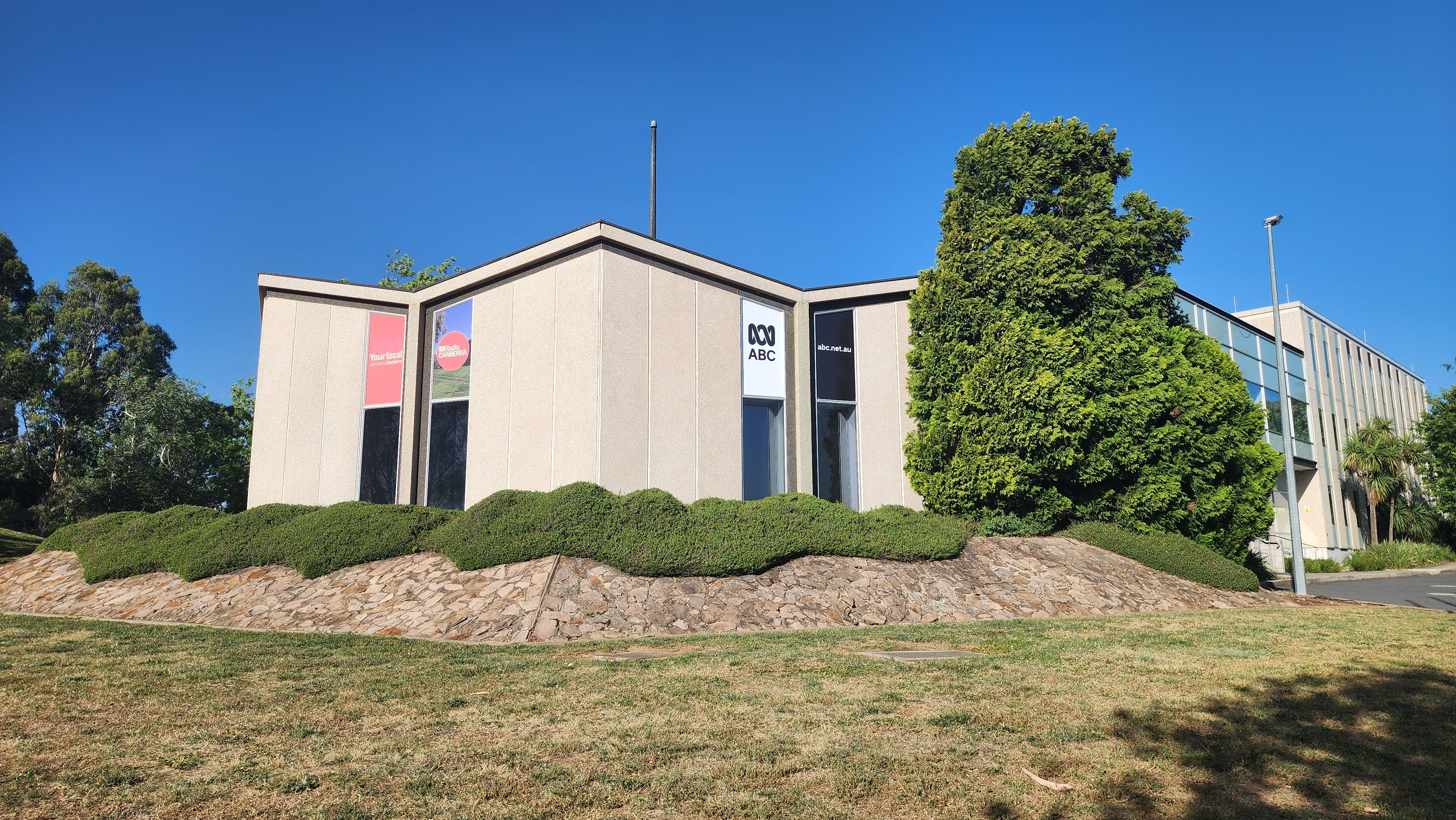
- Canberra, Australian Capital Territory; Australia
- Broadcast area: Canberra and surrounding areas of New South Wales
- Frequencies: AM: 666 kHz; DAB+: 9C

Programming
- Language: English
- Format: Talk
- Affiliations: ABC Local Radio

Ownership
- Owner: Australian Broadcasting Corporation
- Sister stations: Radio National, ABC Classic, Triple J

History
- First air date: 21 January 1953; 73 years ago
- Former frequencies: 1540 kHz (1953–1974); 1440 kHz (1974–1983)

Technical information
- Licensing authority: Australian Communications and Media Authority
- Power: 5,000 watts
- Transmitter coordinates: 35°13′1″S 149°7′14″E

Links
- Website: www.abc.net.au/canberra/

ABC Radio Canberra (call sign: 2CN) is an ABC Local Radio station based in Canberra and broadcasting to the Australian Capital Territory as well as surrounding areas in New South Wales. This includes the cities and towns of Queanbeyan, Yass, and Bungendore. The station can be received as far as Goulburn, however the city is covered by ABC Central West which is based in Orange.

The station began as 2CN in 1953 originally broadcasting on 1540 kHz and from 21 December 1974 at 1440 kHz. On 6 December 1983, it changed to its current AM frequency of 666 kHz. The station first broadcast from studios based at the transmitter site at Gungahlin. In 1957, the station was relocated to the centre of Canberra, before finally moving to purpose-built studios in Dickson in 1964.

2CN rebranded as 666 ABC Canberra in 2000; it changed to its current name, ABC Radio Canberra, in 2017.

ABC Radio announced digital radio services in Canberra, the simulcast of ABC Canberra, Radio National, ABC Classic FM, ABC News Radio and Triple J launched in 2011.

When local programs are not being broadcast the station is a relay of ABC Radio Sydney.

== Current presenters ==
- Greg Jennett
- Adam Shirley
- Sabra Lane
- Richard Fidler
- Sarah Kanowski
- Sally Sara
- Georgia Stynes
- Ross Solly
- Indira Naidoo
- Philip Clark
- Rod Quinn
- Adrienne Francis
- Ian McNamara
- Kim Huynh
- Greg Bayliss
- Craig Quartermaine
