= New Orleans Jesters =

- Full name: New Orleans Jesters
- Nickname: The Manor
- Founded: 2003; 23 years ago
- Stadium: Pan American Stadium; New Orleans, Louisiana
- Capacity: 5,000
- Owner: Dana Stumpf
- Head Coach: Kenny Farrell
- League: National Premier Soccer League
- 2017: 1st, Southeast; Playoffs: Final
- Website: nolajesters.com
Home colors

The New Orleans Jesters are an American soccer team based in New Orleans, Louisiana. Founded in 2003, the team plays in the National Premier Soccer League (NPSL), the fourth tier of the American Soccer Pyramid. Nicknamed 'The Jesters', they are coached by Kenny Farrell, play home games at Pan American Stadium, and their colors are purple, green, and black. The team did not play in the 2026 National Premier Soccer League season and are on hiatus.

== History ==
=== Early years ===
The New Orleans Shell Shockers entered the USL Premier Development League (PDL) as an expansion franchise in 2003, playing at the George G. Westfeldt Facility at Tulane University.

The team played their first season with the nickname the "Shell Shockers" which came from the team's sponsorship by the Shell Oil Company. In its first season, the team won their first game 2–0 over Nashville Metros, then won seven of the next eight. They outscored many of their opponents – they put four goals past the Lafayette Swamp Cats on two separate occasions, with Jonas Lopez scoring a hat trick in one of the games, and they beat the Houston Toros 4–0. After a 5–3 loss on the road against Memphis Express, the Shell Shockers won nine in a row and secured the Mid South Division title well before the final game of the season. The Shell Shockers hosted the Southern Conference playoffs and were favorites to progress. They comfortably overcame Central Florida Kraze 4–1 in the conference semi-final but were uncharacteristically beaten 2–0 in the conference final by Memphis. Head Coach Kenny Farrell was named PDL Coach of the Year.

Having been so dominant the previous year, expectations were high for the Shell Shockers as they approached the 2004 season. After winning their opening fixture of the season 3–1 over the Lafayette Swamp Cats, they lost 8–0 to the DFW Tornados in their next game, having been reduced to nine men by the 57th minute. The team went on a slide, losing to the El Paso Patriots twice, to DFW once more, and to Memphis Express. The Shockers ended the season a disappointing fifth in the Mid South Division, 30 points behind divisional champs El Paso Patriots and well out of the playoffs. Roberto Najarro was the team's top scorer, with 5 goals, while former Carlisle United, West Ham United, and Manchester City midfielder Ian Bishop registered 5 assists.

In 2005, the team moved to Pan American Stadium in City Park and won their first game over Memphis Express. The team then lost their next five games, including a 5–2 defeat at the hands of the Nashville Metros. A brief mid-season surge that included a pair of wins over divisional Laredo Heat sparked the potential for a revival, but four more defeats, including another to Nashville, ended any playoff hopes New Orleans may have had. The team finished sixth in the Mid South Division. Pablo Araya-Espinozo was the season's top scorer, with 9 goals.

In August 2005, Hurricane Katrina heavily damaged Pan American Stadium, along with much of the rest of the area. As a result, the Shell Shockers played at Muss Bertolino Stadium in nearby Kenner, Louisiana for the 2006 season. After their plight was featured by international media, the Shockers, with the support of teams like New England Revolution and individuals such as former Northern Ireland manager Lawrie Sanchez, pledged to help raise $1 million to the redevelopment of City Park. That season the team won just 4 games. The Shockers finished fourth in the Mid South Division, almost 30 points behind divisional champs Laredo Heat. Gautreau and Roberto Najarro were the team's top scorers, with 3 goals each.

In 2007 the team finished the season fifth in the Mid South Division. That season the Shockers did beat their new Louisiana rivals, the Baton Rouge Capitals, new divisional team Mississippi Brilla, and the Austin Lightning. Unfortunately the team was unable to win any of its 8 away games throughout the season. Ged Quinn, Brandon Chagnard, and Gino Ray were the team's top scorers for the year, with 13 goals between them, while Jamie Davies contributed six assists.

The team's sponsorship with the Shell Oil Company ended after the 2007 season, and "Shell" was dropped from the team's name. In 2008, businesswoman Dana Stumpf also bought out long-time chairman Gary Ostroske, and the team moved to a new home within City Park, Tad Gormley Stadium for four games. They also played at Lupin Field at Isidore Newman School for four games. The Shockers struggled for much of the 2008 season. For the fifth year in a row, New Orleans ended the year at the wrong end of the Mid South Division standings, finishing seventh. Brandon Chagnard was the team's top scorer with 4 goals.

=== Rebranding ===
Following the 2008 season, the team underwent a full rebranding. It changed its name, colors, and crest entirely, rebranding themselves as the New Orleans Jesters to better reflect New Orleans culture. The team returned to Pan American Stadium following a full renovation that included the installation of FieldTurf.

The team also developed a renewed focus on improving the local community and developing young soccer talent. In its first year as the New Orleans Jesters, the team went undefeated in the regular season and posted one loss in the playoffs. That year, two players were named to the All-Conference Team, and one received All-League Honors.

=== Move to NPSL ===
On November 2, 2012, it was announced that the Jesters would compete in the National Premier Soccer League, ending the club's nine-year stint in the PDL.

=== 2019 hiatus ===
In early 2019, the Jesters exercised their right to become inactive for the 2019 NPSL season. In 2020, the Jesters resumed play in the NPSL.

=== 2026 hiatus ===
The team did not participate in the 2026 NPSL season and are once again on hiatus.

== Players ==
=== Notable former players ===
This list of notable former players comprises players who went on to play professional soccer after playing for the Jesters, or those who previously played professionally before joining the team.

- (England) Ian Bishop
- (Scotland) Steve McAnespie
- (United States) Jared Montz
- (United States) Anthony Peters
- (United States) Patrick Mullins
- (United States) Andrew Tarbell

== Year-by-year ==
Year	Division	League	Regular season	Avg. attendance	Playoffs	Open Cup
2003	4	USL PDL	1st, Mid South	711 (10th in PDL)	Conference Finals	did not qualify
2004	4	USL PDL	5th, Mid South	278 (31st in PDL)	did not qualify	did not qualify
2005	4	USL PDL	6th, Mid South	600 (13th in PDL)	did not qualify	did not qualify
2006	4	USL PDL	4th, Mid South	719 (8th in PDL)	did not qualify	did not qualify
2007	4	USL PDL	5th, Mid South	321 (31st in PDL)	did not qualify	did not qualify
2008	4	USL PDL	7th, Mid South	172 (52nd in PDL)	did not qualify	did not qualify
2009	4	USL PDL	3rd, Southeast	1,094 (8th in PDL)	Divisional Semi-finals	did not qualify
2010	4	USL PDL	5th, Southeast	1,286 (5th in PDL)	did not qualify	did not qualify
2011	4	USL PDL	4th, Mid South	1,500 (5th in PDL)	did not qualify	did not qualify
2012	4	USL PDL	5th, Mid South	500 (19th in PDL)	did not qualify	did not qualify
2013	4	NPSL	4th, Southeast		did not qualify	did not qualify
2014	4	NPSL	3rd, Southeast		Conference Finals	did not qualify
2015	4	NPSL	5th, Southeast		did not qualify	did not qualify
2016	4	NPSL	3rd, Southeast		Divisional Semi-finals	did not qualify
2017	4	NPSL	1st, Southeast		Conference Finals	did not qualify
2018	4	NPSL	3rd, Southeast		Conference Finals	Lost in First Round
2019	On Hiatus					
2020	4	NPSL	Season cancelled due to COVID-19 pandemic			
2021	4	NPSL	4th, Gulf Coast		Conference Finals	Cancelled
2022	4	NPSL	3rd, Gulf Coast		Conference Finals	Lost in First Round
2023	4	NPSL	5th, Gulf Coast		did not qualify	did not qualify
2024	4	NPSL	7th, Gulf Coast		did not qualify	did not qualify

|} Attendance statistics are calculated by averaging each team's self-reported home attendances from the PDL's historical match archive.

== Honors ==
- USL PDL regular-season champions 2003
- USL PDL Mid South Division champions 2003
- Louisiana Cup winners 2016

== Head coaches ==
- (Republic of Ireland) Kenny Farrell (2003–present)

== Home stadiums ==
- George G. Westfeldt Complex at Tulane University; New Orleans (2003–2004)
- Muss Bertolino Stadium; Kenner, Louisiana (2006–2007)
- Tad Gormley Stadium; New Orleans, 4 games (2008)
- Lupin Field at Isidore Newman School; New Orleans, 4 games (2008)
- Pan American Stadium; New Orleans (2005, 2009–2018, 2020–present)
