= Josh Gardner (soccer) =

American soccer player

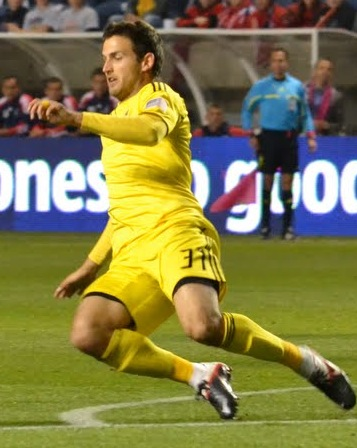

Personal information
- Full name: Joshua Gardner
- Date of birth: September 14, 1982 (age 44)
- Place of birth: Freeport, Texas, U.S.
- Height: 5 ft 11 in (1.80 m)
- Positions: Defender; midfielder

Youth career
- –2001: Houston Hurricanes

College career
Years	Team	Apps	(Gls)
2001–2003	Cincinnati Bearcats		

Senior career*
Years	Team	Apps	(Gls)
2003	Houston Toros	5	(2)
2004–2006	LA Galaxy	21	(1)
2007–2008	Seattle Sounders	52	(7)
2009–2010	Carolina RailHawks	47	(5)
2011	Columbus Crew	22	(2)
2012	Montreal Impact	6	(0)
2013–2014	Sporting Kansas City	7	(0)

International career^{‡}
2003	United States U20	1	(0)
- * Club domestic league appearances and goals as of March 25, 2014 ‡ National team caps and goals as of April 8, 2009

Josh Gardner (born September 4, 1982) is an American former soccer player. Gardner is currently the technical director for the Houston Rangers academy.

== Career ==
=== College and amateur ===
Gardner played college soccer at the University of Cincinnati a starter as a freshman in 2001 to 2003. In 2002, was named second team All-Conference USA, he was tied for team lead with five assists. In 2003, Gardner led the team in points, tied for Bearcats' team lead with six goals and led the team with six assists. Gardner earned All C-USA first team honors, second team All-Region after leading the Bearcats to the NCAA Tournament for only the second time in school history, and first team All-Ohio. He also played for the Houston Toros in the USL Premier Development League.

=== Professional ===
On the strength Gardner's single exceptional game for the United States U-20 national team in 2003, Gardner was offered a Project-40 contract before the 2004 season, which he signed. He was drafted 13th overall in the 2004 MLS SuperDraft by Los Angeles Galaxy, but saw very little playing time with the team, appearing in only two games, playing 25 minutes.

His stock rose prior to the 2006 season, as he turned in a strong performance in the CONCACAF Champions' Cup and started two of the first three games of the MLS season. Unfortunately, he soon fell out of favor with then-coach Steve Sampson and would not see much playing time until Sampson was fired and replaced by Frank Yallop. After Yallop's arrival, Gardner started every Galaxy game and was even mentioned as a replacement at left-back when the Galaxy traded Todd Dunivant. Gardner scored his first MLS goal on July 8, 2006, against Real Salt Lake. The Galaxy eventually released Gardner on March 23, 2007. During his three years with the Galaxy, Gardner played 1,096 minutes in 21 games and was a member of the Galaxy team that won both the MLS Cup and the Lamar Hunt U.S. Open Cup in 2005.

Gardner signed with the Seattle Sounders of the USL First Division in 2007, and quickly became their starting left midfielder, helping them win the USL1 Championship in his first year with the team.

When the USL Sounders were replaced by the MLS expansion team Seattle Sounders FC at the end of the 2008 season Gardner signed with the Carolina RailHawks in January 2009. He played 47 regular season games for Carolina over the next two seasons, helping them to a divisional title and the final of the USSF Division 2 Pro League playoffs in 2010.

Gardner made a return to Major League Soccer in 2011 when he signed with the Columbus Crew. He made his Black & Gold debut on February 22, 2011, in leg 1 of the Crew's CONCACAF Champions League quarter-final series against Real Salt Lake. On August 27, 2011, Gardner set an MLS record for fastest time between a goal and an own goal against the Seattle Sounders, scoring in the 73rd minute, and scoring an own goal in the 74th.

Gardner was left exposed by Columbus in the 2011 MLS Expansion Draft and was selected by expansion side Montreal Impact. He stayed with Montreal through the 2012 season, but the club announced in November 2012 that he would not return in 2013. His rights were traded to Sporting Kansas City in exchange for a second-round 2013 MLS SuperDraft pick.

Gardner was waived by Sporting on March 25, 2014.

=== International ===
In 2003 Gardner was invited to play in the US Soccer Festival with the United States U-20 national team. He assisted on the game's only goal.

== Honors ==
=== Sporting Kansas City ===
- MLS Cup: 2013

=== Los Angeles Galaxy ===
- MLS Cup: 2005

=== Seattle Sounders ===
- USL First Division Championship (1): 2007
- USL First Division Commissioner's Cup (1): 2007
