= 2012 USASA Region II National Cup =

Tournament details
- Country: United States
- Teams: 6

The 2012 USASA Region II National Cup was a qualifying tournament that determined which clubs from the second region of the United States Adult Soccer Association qualified for the first round proper of the 2012 U.S. Open Cup. The Region II National Cup's first round matches took place on 14 April 2012 with the 2nd round match taking place on 15 April 2012. The regional tournament was held in Bensenville, IL. A blind draw held before the tournament determined that the winner of the Cincy Saints/KC Athletics match would receive an automatic berth into the 2012 U.S. Open Cup. The winners of the other two matches would play to determine the 2nd and final berth for Region II.

== Qualification ==
Subregion	Tournament	Winner	Ref
Illinois		AAC Eagles	
Illinois		RWB Adria	
Kansas		KC Athletics	
Michigan		Ann Arbor	
Southern Ohio		Cincy Saints	
Wisconsin	2012 Wisconsin Open Cup	Croatian Eagles	

== Bracket ==
Round One
(Illinois)	AAC Eagles	7
(Michigan)	Ann Arbor	1
(Wisconsin)	Croatian Eagles	2
(Illinois)	RWB Adria	0

Round Two
(Ohio)	Cincy Saints	2
(Kansas)	KC Athletics	10
(Illinois)	AAC Eagles	0
(Wisconsin)	Croatian Eagles	2

== See also ==
- 2012 U.S. Open Cup
- 2012 U.S. Open Cup qualification
- United States Adult Soccer Association
