= Daka (surname) =

Daka is a surname of Zambian origin. Notable people with the surname include:

- John Daka (born 1997), American football linebacker of Zambian descent
- Patrick Daka (born 1975), Zambian footballer
- Patson Daka (born 1998), Zambian footballer
- Peter Daka (born 1960), Zambian politician
