= ABC News at Noon =

Australian TV news bulletin

- Presented by: Ros Childs; Ruby Cornish
- Country of origin: Australia
- Original language: English
- No. of seasons: 21

Production
- Running time: 60 minutes

Original release
- Network: ABC TV; ABC News
- Release: February 2005 – present

ABC News at Noon is an Australian midday news programme which airs on ABC TV and ABC News and is presented by Ros Childs (weekdays) and Ruby Cornish (weekends) from the ABC's main national news studios at Ultimo.

A separate edition of the bulletin is produced for Western Australia two to three hours after the original broadcast, as the time delay was deemed too long to remain up-to-date.

== History ==
The bulletin was launched in February 2005 to replace the less successful Midday News and Business, preceded in turn by the long-running World at Noon.

In March 2014, the programme's running-time was extended to one hour.

Brigid Glanville, Nicole Chettle, Deborah Rice and Tracy Kirkland have been fill in news presenters for the bulletin.
