= E. E. Waddell High School =

Defunct school in North Carolina, United States

Coordinates: 35.1553°N 80.9002°W

E. E. Waddell High School was a high school located in Charlotte, North Carolina. It was closed at the end of the 2010–2011 school year. The facility that housed the former high school is now used by E. E. Waddell Language Academy, a public K–8 language immersion magnet school.

== History ==
In the mid-1990s, responding to phenomenal growth in the southern parts of Mecklenburg County, the Charlotte-Mecklenburg School Board decided to build a new high school between South Mecklenburg and Olympic high schools. The new school was to open for the 2001–2002 school year. The site selected was located off I-77 on Nations Ford Road.

In the spring of 2001, the School Board named the new school after Elbert Edwin Waddell (1922–1988). The school was dedicated formally on Sunday, June 2, 2002.

In 2010, Charlotte-Mecklenburg Schools voted to close the high school and use the facility for Smith Academy of International Languages due to budget cuts and low enrollment rates. The school was renamed E. E. Waddell Language Academy.

In 2011, the last graduating class of E. E. Waddell High School graduated.

== Mascot ==
The school's original mascot, the Raider, reflects the rich history of the Nations Ford (a convenient crossing over the Catawba River) and surrounding area in the founding of the United States. It is reminiscent of the "overmountain men" and other southern patriots who fought with unconventional methods—which contributed to the southern piedmont being described as a "Hornet's Nest" in the Revolutionary War (1775–1781).

When Smith Language Academy relocated to the Waddell campus, the Ram mascot was brought along. The school's athletic teams are known as the Waddell Language Academy Rams.

== Stadium ==
E.E. Waddell Language Academy Stadium
- Interactive map of E.E. Waddell Language Academy Stadium
- Location: 7030 Nations Ford Road; Charlotte, North Carolina 28217
- Owner: City of Charlotte
- Operator: Charlotte-Mecklenburg Schools
- Capacity: 6,000 (bleachers)
- Surface: Grass

Construction
- Opened: 2001 (25 years ago)

Tenants
- E.E. Waddell Rams (2001–2011); Charlotte Eagles (USL-2) (2001–2007); Charlotte Lady Eagles (W-League) (2001–2007); Olympic Trojans (2013); West Meck Hawks (2012)

E.E. Waddell Language Academy Stadium is a 6,000-capacity stadium located on the grounds of E. E. Waddell Language Academy in Charlotte, North Carolina.

The stadium is used for Waddell Soccer, track and field, and American football. It also served as the home ground for the Charlotte Eagles of the USL Second Division through the 2007 season.

In 2013, Olympic and West Mecklenburg high schools moved several games to the stadium while their own stadiums underwent renovations.

== Namesake ==
E. E. Waddell, educator and community leader, received his bachelor's and master's degrees from North Carolina A & T State University and his Doctor of Education degree from Duke University.

He served as principal of Kingville High School (Albemarle, N. C.) from 1943 to 1963, and in honor of his community involvement, the original school campus was renamed E. E. Waddell Community Center.

Waddell was principal of Charlotte's Second Ward High School from 1963 to 1969 when he was named Assistant to the Superintendent of Charlotte-Mecklenburg Schools. From 1976 to 1979, he was Area Superintendent in the Harding Area. In 1979, he was appointed Assistant Superintendent for Auxiliary Services, the position he held until his retirement in 1982.

== Notable alumni ==
Alexander Michael Cecil won first place in the 2011 Intel International Science and Engineering Fair for his project titled The Assessment of Silver Nanoparticles in the Environment on Gene Expression in C. elegans. Asteroid 28453 Alexcecil was also named for him along with the $3000 prize.
