= Pan American Stadium (New Orleans) =

Multi-purpose stadium in New Orleans, Louisiana

- Pan Am Stadium
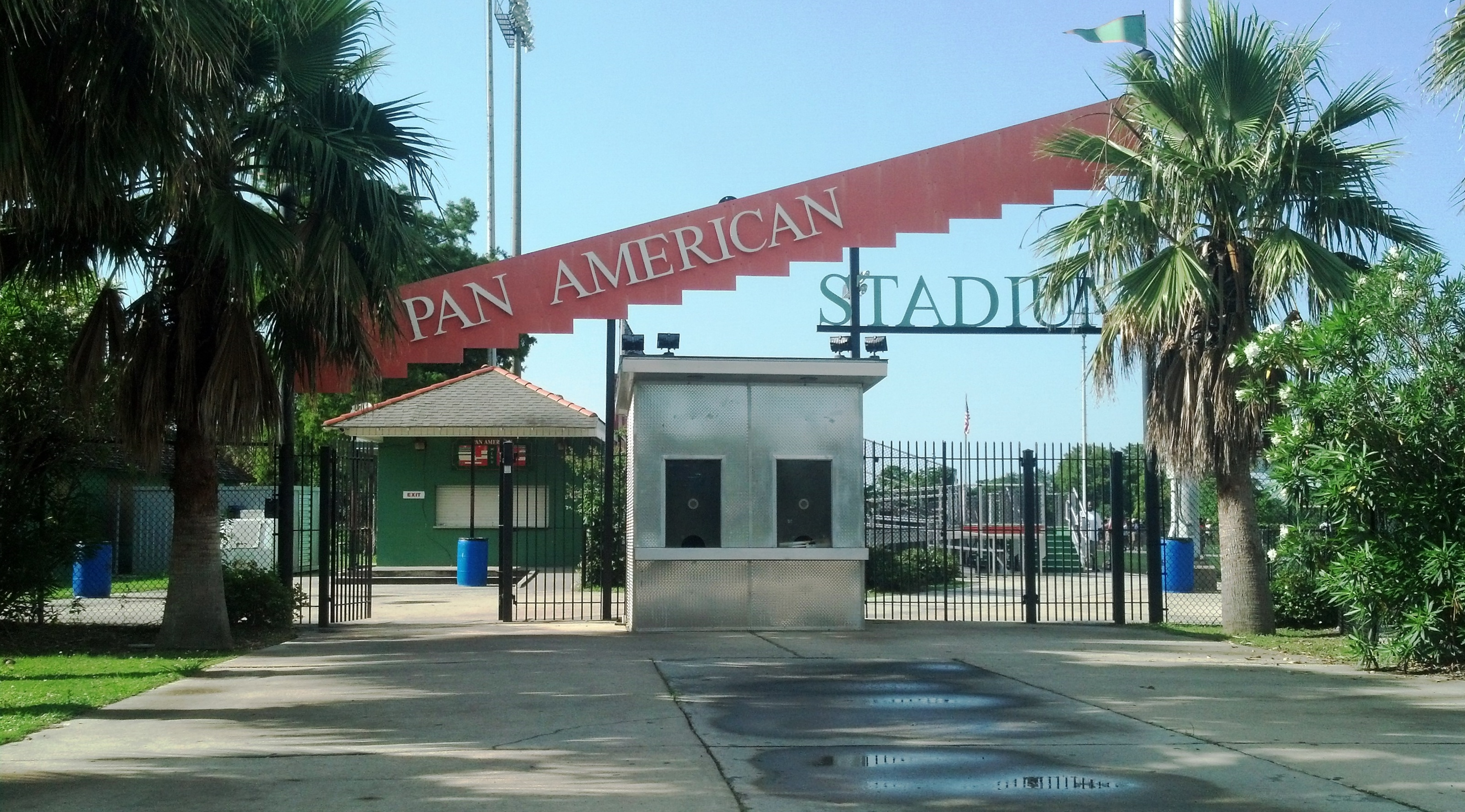
- Interactive map of Pan American Stadium
- Location: City Park, New Orleans
- Coordinates: 29.9944°N 90.0879°W
- Owner: New Orleans City Park
- Operator: New Orleans City Park
- Capacity: 5,000
- Surface: FieldTurf

Construction
- Opened: 1973
- Renovated: 2008

Tenants
- LHSAA (Football) (1973–present); New Orleans Riverboat Gamblers (USISL) (1993–1995); New Orleans Blaze (WFA) (2002–2011); New Orleans Shell Shockers (PDL) (2005); New Orleans Jesters (NPSL) (2009–18, 2020–present); New Orleans Bayou Queens (WAFL) (2012); New Orleans Privateers football (Club) (2012); Motagua New Orleans (GCPL) (2014–present)

Pan American Stadium is a 5,000 seat multi-purpose outdoor stadium, located in City Park, in New Orleans, Louisiana. It is used for soccer, American football, lacrosse and rugby. It is currently home to the New Orleans Jesters of the National Premier Soccer League (NPSL) and Motagua New Orleans of the Gulf Coast Premier League.

The stadium also plays host to Louisiana High School Athletic Association football games and soccer matches.

Pan American was constructed to relieve the number of high school football games held at Tad Gormley Stadium, the main City Park facility.

== History ==
In 2005, Hurricane Katrina flooded the stadium. It was renovated and re-opened in 2008. A FieldTurf playing surface was installed at the stadium, along with new bleachers, new press box, new scoreboard and renovated locker rooms. The renovations were provided in part by the National Football League Youth Football Fund on behalf of the New Orleans Saints.

The Allstate Sugar Bowl Collegiate Lacrosse Series was held at the stadium from 2011 to 2015.

The New Orleans Privateers club football team played at the stadium in 2012.

In 2015, the stadium hosted the high school rugby state championship (rugby is not sponsored by the LHSAA).

== Gallery ==
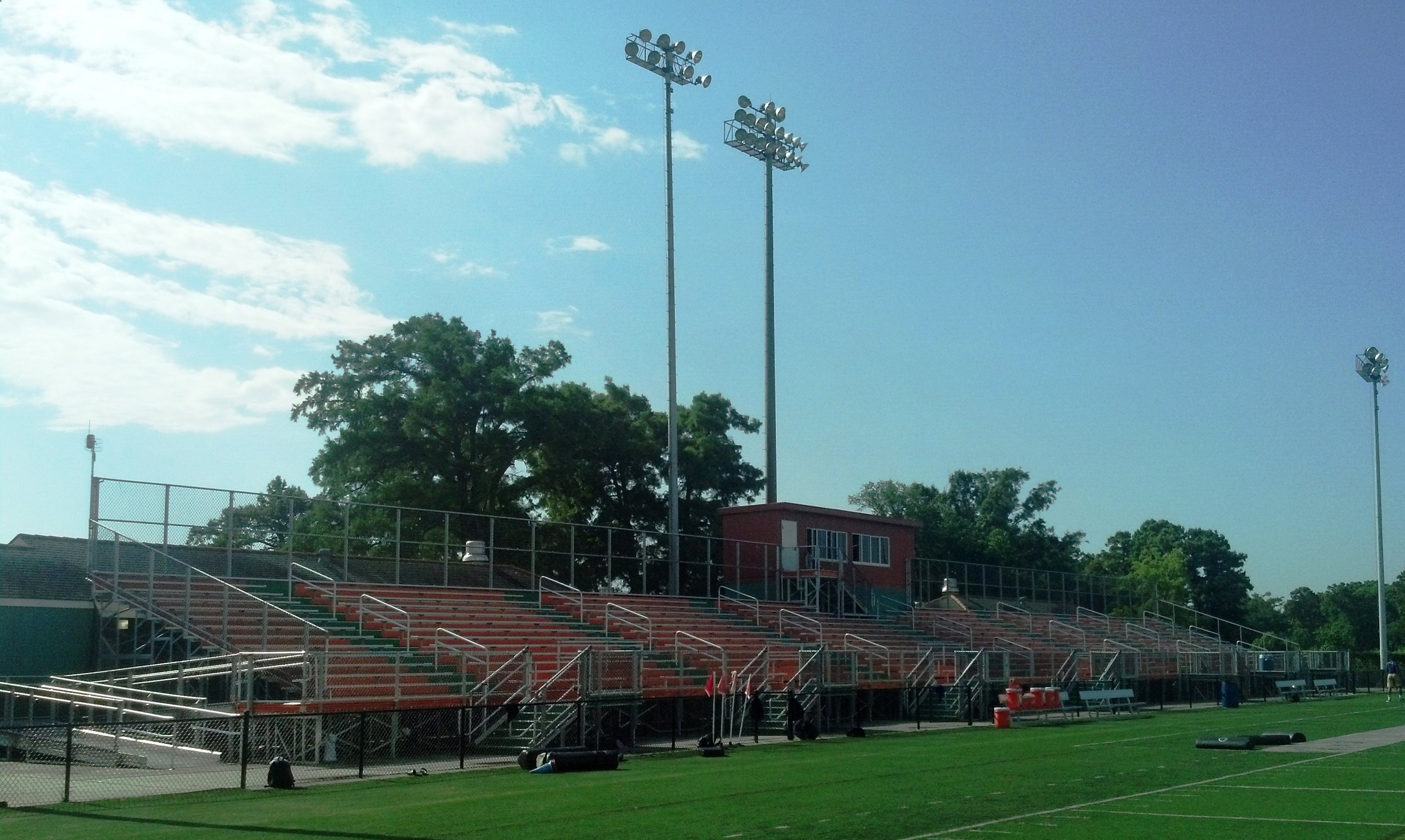
Pan American Stadium - Home Grandstand

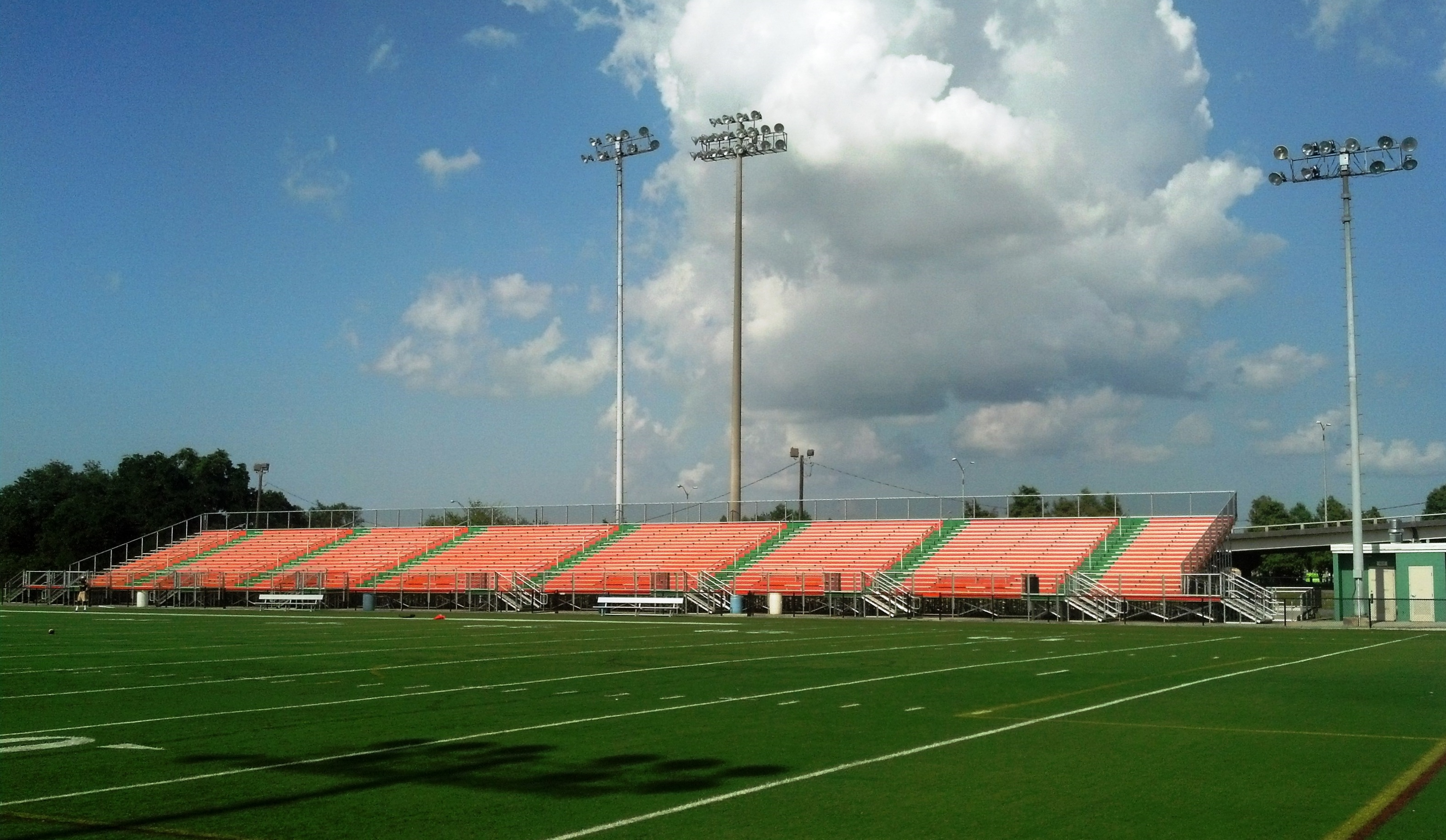
Pan American Stadium - Away Grandstand

== See also ==
- City Park (New Orleans)
- List of soccer stadiums in the United States
