= Women's Arena Football League =

American indoor football league

- Sport: Arena football
- Founded: 2011
- Founder: Ivan Tompkins
- First season: 2012
- Folded: 2013
- CEO: Ivan Tompkins
- Commissioner: Anthony Bartley
- No. of teams: 8
- Country: United States
- Headquarters: 4615 Southwest Freeway Houston, Texas, U.S.A.
- Related competitions: Legends Football League
- Website: WAFLeague.com

The Women's Arena Football League (WAFL) was an 8-on-8 full contact professional American indoor football league based out of Houston, Texas. Founded in 2011, games were played in the spring and summer months in arenas around the United States. The league is somewhat similar to the male-based Arena Football League and Indoor Football League, but with slightly different rules as well as no goalposts or rebound nets. It began play in 2012 with six teams. The founder and league president is Ivan Tompkins, Dwayne Ware Coach and former AFL player with the Houston Thunderbears and head coach of the charter Houston Lady Oilers. Their championship game is known as the Diva Bowl.

The WAFL was created as a more family-friendly alternative to the rival Legends Football League. As opposed to the lingerie (later bikini wear) worn by the players in the LFL, the WAFL's players wore more traditional women's athletic gear. A bunch of volleyball, flag football, and former LFL players were playing in the league. Some women werestlers also played in the league.

Following their inaugural season in 2013, the WAFL went dormant in preparations for a future return. As of 2026, the WAFL is disbanded, but the WAFL Facebook page, and some of the team pages are inactive, but still standing.

== Teams ==
Teams	Location	Arena	Founded	Coach	Fate
Atlanta Archers	Suwanee, Georgia	Atlanta Silverbacks Suwanee Indoor	2012	TBA	Folded mid-season, never played a game
Dallas Darlings	Garland, Texas	Curtis Culwell Center	2012	TBA	Folded after season
Houston Lady Oilers	Houston, Texas Shenandoah, Texas	Brown Convention Center (never played) Reliant Arena (exhibton) Texans Indoor Soccer (regular season) Sports Culture (playoffs)	2012	Dwayne Ware	Folded after season
Jacksonville Cougars	Jacksonville, Florida	TBA	2012	n/a	Never played
New Orleans Bayou Queens	Kenner, Louisiana New Orleans, Louisiana	Pontchartrain Center (regular season) Pan American Stadium (playoffs)	2012	Clyde Maiden	Folded after season
Orlando Eclipse	Orlando, Florida	TBA	2012	n/a	Never played
San Antonio Estrella	San Antonio, Texas	TBA	2012	n/a	Never played
Tampa Bay Duchess	Tampa, Florida	TBA	2012	n/a	Never played
