= Craig Smart =

Craig Smart may refer to:

- Craig Smart (journalist), Australian journalist
- Craig Smart (singer), Canadian singer songwriter
