= Calgary Storm Prospects =

Canadian soccer team

- Full name: Calgary Storm Prospects
- Nicknames: The Storm, Prospects
- Founded: 2002
- Dissolved: 2003
- Stadium: Glenmore Park Stadium
- Coach: Tommy Wheeldon, Sr.
- League: USL Premier Development League
- 2003: 5th, Northwest Division

Calgary Storm Prospects (formerly the Calgary Storm Select) were a Canadian soccer team who played in the Premier Development League, the fourth tier of the American Soccer Pyramid in 2002 and 2003. The team was the official development team of the Calgary Storm of the USL A-League. They played their home games at Glenmore Park Stadium.

== History ==
In 2002, the Calgary Storm moved their PDL team to the USL A-League from the PDL, but created a development team to replace the PDL side. The played in the Northwest Division in the Western Conference.

In 2003, club owner Michael Vandale resigned as owner, citing personal issues and mounting financial losses, handing over the operation of the club to the United Soccer Leagues. The league immediately disbanded the PDL reserve team, with the Abbotsford Rangers, who were operating a provisional league member, taking over the remainder of their fixtures.

== Year-by-year ==
Year	Division	League	Reg. season	Playoffs
2002	4	PDL	4th, Northwest	Did not qualify
2003 (Note: The Calgary Storm Prospects franchise was terminated prior to the end of the season and replaced by the Abbotsford Rangers)	4	PDL	5th, Northwest	Did not qualify
