= David Vaudreuil =

American soccer player (born 1966)

Personal information
- Full name: David Scott Vaudreuil
- Date of birth: December 21, 1966 (age 59)
- Place of birth: Honolulu, Hawaii, United States
- Height: 5 ft 7 in (1.70 m)
- Positions: Midfielder; defender

College career
Years	Team	Apps	(Gls)
1984–1987	Princeton Tigers		

Senior career*
Years	Team	Apps	(Gls)
1989	Washington Stars		
1989–1991	Baltimore Blast (indoor)	49	(10)
1991–1992	Harrisburg Heat (indoor)	?	(20)
1992–1995	Milwaukee Wave (indoor)	100	(39)
1993	Tampa Bay Rowdies	19	(3)
1994	Puebla F.C.		
1995	Houston Force	1	(0)
1995	New York Centaurs	24	(0)
1995–1996	Baltimore Spirit (indoor)	23	(23)
1996	Hampton Roads Mariners		
1996–1997	D.C. United	39	(0)
1998	Miami Fusion	20	(3)
1998–2000	Colorado Rapids	66	(0)
2001	Baltimore Blast (indoor)	12	(2)
2001	Connecticut Wolves	7	(1)
2001–2002	Chicago Fire	26	(1)
2001	→ Milwaukee Rampage (loan)	1	(0)

Managerial career
- 1992: DePaul University (assistant)
- 2003: Jersey Shore Boca
- 2004–2005: Atlanta Silverbacks
- 2006: Chicago Storm (assistant)
- 2007: Hollywood United
- 2012: New England Revolution (assistant coach)
- 2017–2018: Tulsa Roughnecks
- * Club domestic league appearances and goals

David Vaudreuil (born December 21, 1966) is an American former professional soccer player whose career spanned fifteen teams in over six leagues including seven seasons in Major League Soccer, winning two MLS Cups with DC United and a Mexican Pro Indoor championship with Puebla FC. He is the former head coach of the Atlanta Silverbacks and the Tulsa Roughnecks, and was an assistant coach with the New England Revolution. Vaudreuil is the owner and Head Coach of the UPSL Conquistadores in Lakewood Ranch, Florida.

== Playing career ==
=== Youth ===
Born in Hawaii, Vaudreuil grew up in Canton, Connecticut where he was a 1983 high school All American soccer player at Canton High School. He was a member of the school's 1981 state championship soccer team. He graduated in 1984, was inducted into the school's Wall of Fame in 2006 and was inducted into the Connecticut Soccer Hall of Fame in 2007. In 1984, Vaudreuil entered Princeton University, playing on the men's soccer team from 1984 to 1987 He graduated in 1988 with a bachelor's degree in East Asian History.

=== Professional ===
Vaudreuil began his professional career in 1989 with the Washington Stars in the American Soccer League. That fall, he signed with the Baltimore Blast of the Major Indoor Soccer League. In 1990, the Blast went to the MISL championship series where they fell to the San Diego Sockers. On October 18, 1991, Vaudreuil signed with the expansion Harrisburg Heat in the National Professional Soccer League. He spent one season in Harrisburg. In September 1992, the Cleveland Crunch selected Vaudreuil in the NPSL Expansion Draft then traded him to the Milwaukee Wave in exchange for Tim Barto, Mark Kerlin and Bill Andracki on October 19, 1992. During this season, he moved from midfield to defense, a position he remained in for the rest of his career. He would play three indoor seasons in Milwaukee before moving to the Baltimore Spirit in 1995. However, he also continued to sporadically play outdoor soccer. On June 5, 1993, he signed with the Tampa Bay Rowdies of the American Professional Soccer League. The team went to the playoff semifinals then folded at the end of the season. Then in 1995, he joined the Houston Force, an expansion team in the USISL. The team played only one game, a 3–0 loss to the Los Angeles Salsa, then folded seven days later. He then moved to the New York Centaurs of the A-League for the rest of the season. In 1994, he played for Puebla F.C. when it won a Mexican indoor championship. In the fall of 1995, Vaudreuil moved to the Baltimore Spirit for the 1995–1996 NPSL season. On February 4, 1996, Los Angeles Galaxy selected Vaudreuil in the second round (seventeenth overall) of the 1996 MLS Supplemental Draft. The Galaxy waived him on March 26, 1996. He then signed with the Hampton Roads Mariners in the USISL. On May 16, 1996, the Mariners sent him on loan to D.C. United of Major League Soccer. He transferred to United on June 28. He spent two seasons in D.C., winning two MLS championships and one Open Cup. On November 6, 1997, the Miami Fusion selected him with the first pick of the 1997 MLS Expansion Draft. On August 14, 1998, Miami traded Vaudreuil to the Colorado Rapids in exchange for Tyrone Marshall and Jason Boyce. He played two season in Colorado before becoming a free agent at the end of the 2000 season. On February 23, 2001, he moved back to the Baltimore Blast. In the spring of 2001, Vaudreuil joined the Connecticut Wolves in the USL First Division. On July 3, 2001, the Chicago Fire signed Vaudreuil as a discovery player. He spent two seasons in Chicago, after going on loan to the Milwaukee Rampage for one game in 2001.

== Coaching career ==
In 1992, Vaudreuil served as an assistant coach with DePaul University's men's soccer team while he took graduate courses at the university. On January 10, 2003, Vaudreuil was hired as the head coach of the Jersey Shore Boca in the Premier Development League. On February 9, 2004, the Atlanta Silverbacks of the USL First Division hired Vaudreuil as head coach. On June 15, 2005, the Silverbacks fired Vaudreuil after he had compiled a 17–16–6 record over two years. On September 15, 2005, he became an assistant coach with the Chicago Storm. He then spent the fall of 2006 as the executive director for Chivas USA. He then moved Hollywood United where he served as head coach in 2007. As of August 3, 2009 he was appointed as the head coach for the Los Angeles Galaxy U-18. He was the Director of coaching for the Connecticut PSE Rush franchise. He is a former Assistant Coach for the New England Revolution MLS Soccer club.

In addition to his playing and coaching careers, Vaudreuil served as an Executive Committee Member of the Major League Soccer Players Association from 1997 to 2002. He was inducted into the Connecticut Soccer Hall of Fame in 2007.
