= Upward Stars =

- Ground: USC Upstate Stadium
- Capacity: 2,000
- League: National Premier Soccer League
- Website: http://www.upwardstarsupstate.org/

Upwards Stars is a semi-professional club soccer team in Spartanburg, South Carolina. They started playing in the National Premier Soccer League.

== Players ==
| No. | Position | Nation | Player |
|---|---|---|---|
| 1 | | USA | Ruben Rodriguez |
| 2 | | USA | Ricardo Barbetty |
| 3 | | USA | Ben Allen |
| 5 | | USA | Jon Finlay |
| 6 | | USA | Juan Quintero |
| 7 | | USA | Bilal Nakhli |
| 9 | | USA | Jonathan Grant |
| 10 | | USA | Miguel Teos |
| 11 | | USA | Alejandro Sanchez |
| 13 | | USA | Ara Amirkhanian |
| 14 | | USA | Andre Carle |
| 17 | | USA | Nicolas Lique Cifuentes |
| 19 | | USA | Jovany Macias |
| 22 | | USA | Mitch McKay |
| 24 | | USA | Andres Lozano |
| 28 | | USA | Haven Bruce |
| 31 | | USA | Joaquin Diez |
| 37 | | USA | Tayeb Ahmadi |
| 41 | | USA | Camilo Botero |
| 43 | | USA | Bastien Montagnon |
| — | | USA | Austen Burnikel |
| — | | USA | Keenon Copeland |
| — | | USA | Staford Karnwie |
| — | | USA | Benjamin Montry |
| — | | USA | Erick Torres |

=== Coaching staff ===
- (United States) Paul Henson - Head Coach
- (United States) Camilo Rodriguez - Assistant Coach
- (United States) Mitch McKay - Goalkeepers Coach
