= Patrick Daka =

Zimbabwean footballer (born 1975)

Personal information
- Full name: Patrick Taurai Daka
- Date of birth: 6 September 1975 (age 51)
- Place of birth: Harare, Zimbabwe
- Height: 5 ft 11 in (1.80 m)
- Positions: Midfielder; forward

College career
Years	Team	Apps	(Gls)
2002–2003	Western Baptist Warriors		

Senior career*
Years	Team	Apps	(Gls)
1995–1996	Hessen Kassel	19	(1)
1997–1998	Black Aces		
1998–2000	Darryn T		
2000–2001	Free State Stars		
2002–2003	Cascade Surge	20	(10)
2004–2010	Charlotte Eagles	101	(14)

International career
- Zimbabwe U-23
1998–1999	Zimbabwe		
- * Club domestic league appearances and goals as of 15 August 2010

Patrick Daka (born 6 September 1975 in Harare) is a Zimbabwean footballer who last played for Charlotte Eagles in the USL Second Division.

== Career ==
=== Early career ===
Daka began his career in his native Zimbabwe. At age 19, Daka signed with Hessen Kassel F.C in Germany in 1995 and played two seasons with them. He played games against Borussia Dortmund, Bayern Munich and Stuttgart to name a few scoring a magical goal in the 90th minute against Borussia Dortmund in Kassel.

He played for Black Aces and Darryn T in the Zimbabwe Premier Soccer League.

=== College ===
Daka moved to the United States in 2001, and subsequently played two years of college soccer at Western Baptist College (now Corban University), where he earned many honours including NAIA All-American, College Male Athlete of the Year, NAIA National Championship Most Outstanding Offensive Player and All-Conference Honors. During his college years he also played with Cascade Surge in the USL Premier Development League.

=== Professional ===
His first USA signing was with the Charlotte Eagles in the Pro Soccer League in 2004, and has been with the team ever since. He made his professional debut on 15 May 2004, scoring a goal in Charlotte's 3–2 win over the Northern Virginia Royals. He has since gone on to make more than 100 appearances for the Eagles.

Daka was not listed on the 2011 roster for Charlotte. He is now on the club's coaching staff.

=== International ===
Daka is a former full member of the Zimbabwe national football team, having played for the Warriors in the COSAFA Cup in 1998 and 1999, World Cup qualifiers, African Cup qualifiers, and in numerous friendlies.

=== Personal life ===
Daka now coaches youth soccer at Charlotte Soccer Academy and offers camps for youth throughout the year.
