= Greg Jennett =

Australian television presenter and journalist

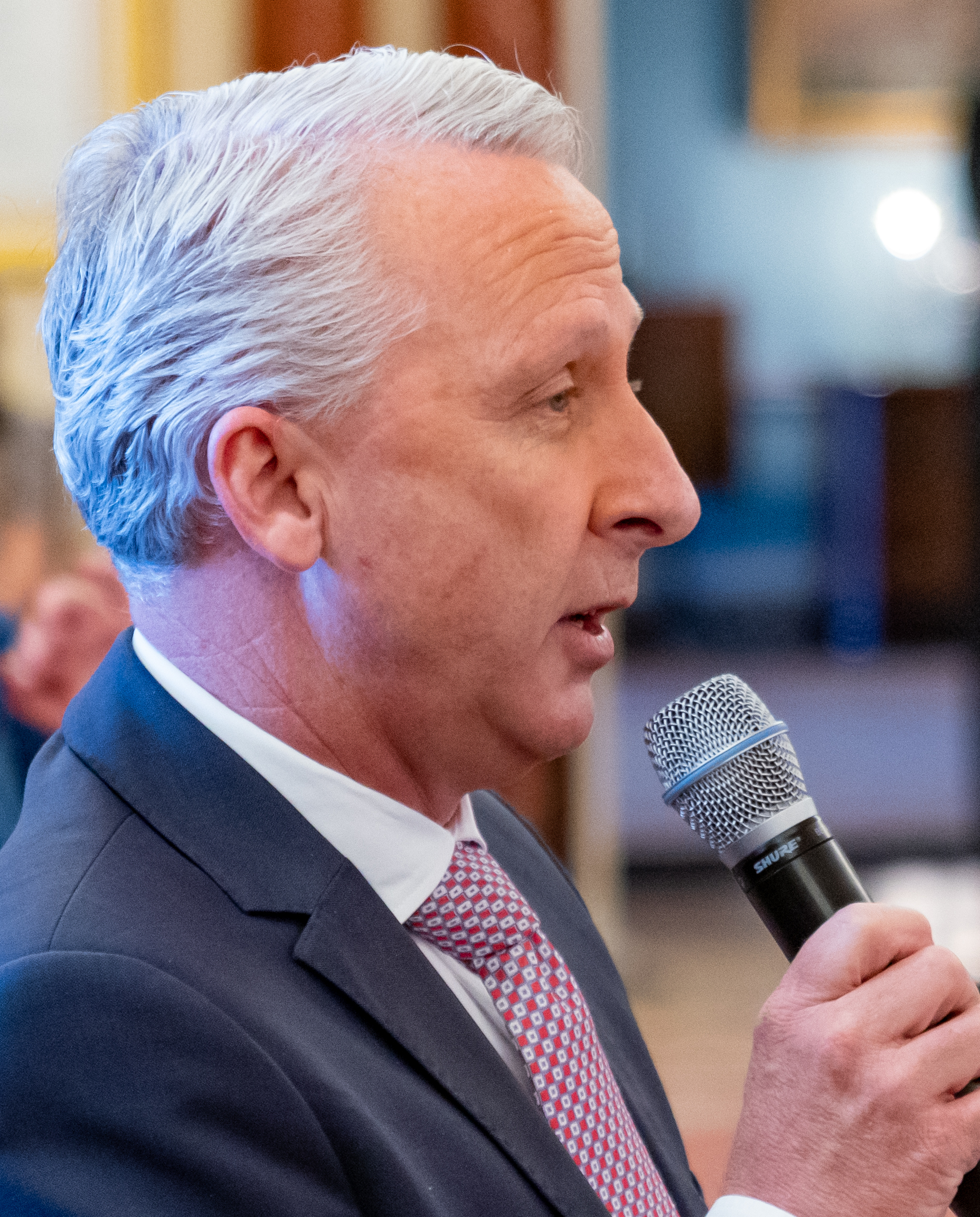
- Greg Jennett, 2021
- Born: Gregory Robert Jennett; 15 August 1968 (age 57)
- Education: Newington College
- Occupation: Television presenter
- Employer: Australian Broadcasting Corporation
- Television: ABC News

Gregory Robert Jennett (born 15 August 1968) is an Australian television presenter and journalist.

Jennett is currently presents the ACT edition of ABC News on the ABC TV station in Canberra from Monday to Thursday each week on ABC News.

== Career ==
Jennett completed his high school education at Newington College in 1986. He has been a journalist since 1995 and reports politics for the Australian Broadcasting Corporation. He started in radio and then moved to television news.

He was previously host of the Capital Hill program on ABC News.

During 2020 and 2021, he reported from the ABC's Washington bureau. In 2022, Jennett was appointed host of Afternoon Briefing on ABC News replacing Patricia Karvelas.

In 2025, Jennett will commence as presenter of ABC News ACT from Sunday to Thursday, replacing James Glenday. With this change, Karvelas will return to Afternoon Briefing as host.
