= Craig Smart (journalist) =

Australian journalist

Craig Smart is an Australian journalist.

Craig Smart completed his Bachelor of Journalism at Murdoch University in 1998 and began his career as a journalist with West Australian Newspapers in Albany. He spent 10 years with the ABC as a reporter and radio news presenter from 2000 to 2010. He was the ABC's weekend television presenter from late 2005 to 2010.

In 2011, Smart joined Ten News Perth as a presenter alongside Narelda Jacobs.

In November 2012, Smart's contract with Network Ten was not renewed, with the bulletin returning to a single presenter format.

In 2024 Smart returned to the ABC as a news presenter.
