= Haven Bruce =

American soccer player (born 1979)

Personal information
- Full name: Haven Bruce
- Date of birth: January 12, 1979 (age 47)
- Place of birth: Charlotte, North Carolina, United States
- Height: 5 ft 9 in (1.75 m)
- Position: Striker

Team information
- Current team: Upward Stars FC
- Number: 9

Senior career*
Years	Team	Apps	(Gls)
2003	Wilmington Hammerheads	-	(-)
2004	AD San Carlos	-	(-)
2005	Greenville Lions	-	(-)
2006	Harrisburg City Islanders	11	(0)
2008	Performance FC Phoenix		
2015	Upward Stars FC	1	(0)
- * Club domestic league appearances and goals

Haven Bruce (born January 12, 1979, in Charlotte, North Carolina) is an American soccer striker who currently plays for Upward Stars FC in the National Premier Soccer League. He started his career with the Wilmington Hammerheads before moving to Costa Rica to play for Asociacion Deportiva San Carlos. Bruce returned to the US in 2005 and subsequently had spells with the Greenville Lions and the Harrisburg City Islanders before joining Performance FC in 2008. During his time with Performance, he had a trial with the Atlanta Silverbacks. After stepping away from playing to focus on coaching and family, Bruce signed with Upward Stars FC in early 2015. He is now coaching successfully at CESA.
