= Worcester Kings =

- Full name: Worcester Kings
- Nickname: The Kings
- Founded: 2002
- Dissolved: 2003
- Ground: John Coughlin Memorial Field
- League: USL Premier Development League
- 2003: 9th, did not make playoffs

Worcester Kings were an American soccer team, founded in 2002, who were members of the United Soccer Leagues Premier Development League (PDL), the fourth tier of the American Soccer Pyramid, until 2003, after which the team left the league and the franchise was terminated.

The Kings played their home games at the John Coughlin Memorial Field on the campus of Worcester State College in the city of Worcester, Massachusetts.

== Year-by-year ==
Year	Division	League	Reg. season	Playoffs	Open Cup
2002	4	USL PDL	4th, Northeast	Did not qualify	Did not qualify
2003	4	USL PDL	9th, Northeast	Did not qualify	Did not qualify

== Stadia ==
- John Coughlin Memorial Field, Worcester, Massachusetts 2003
