= 2012 U.S. Open Cup qualification =

American soccer cup qualification competition

The 2012 Lamar Hunt U.S. Open Cup tournament proper features teams from all five tiers of men's soccer of the American Soccer Pyramid.

For the 2012 tournament, all American-based teams from the top two tiers, Major League Soccer and the North American Soccer League, will earns berths into the third and second round propers of the tournament, respectively. Thus making it the first time in six years that all first and second division teams automatically qualify into the tournament.

For the third, fourth and fifth tiers of the pyramid, a series of qualification and state tournaments are held to determine the berths into the tournament. Most states began their qualification in October or November 2011 and will conclude in March 2012. These teams, will complete the 64 team field in the U.S. Open Cup.

== USL Premier Development League ==
Previously, the berths in the USL Premier Development League were determined by each divisional leader after a select number of PDL regular season matches. For 2012, the PDL was allocated 16 berths, up from eight. Additionally, US Soccer required that all berths be determined by May 5. Therefore, the league decided that 4 clubs from each conference would qualify based on the results from 2011. The top 2 US based clubs from each division in the Central, Southern, and Western conference would qualify. For the Eastern Conference the qualifiers were the top team from each of the three divisions and a "wildcard" from the remaining teams – the team with the most points from the regular season.

Since the 1st place team, Thunder Bay Chill, in the Heartland Division is a Canadian club, Real Colorado Foxes qualified for the US Open Cup even though they did not participate in the 2011 playoffs. Likewise, since the 2nd place team in the Northwest Division, Victoria Highlanders, and the 3rd place team, Vancouver Whitecaps Residency, are both Canadian clubs, the 4th place team Portland Timbers U23's qualified. The Eastern conference runner-up, Jersey Express, did not qualify for the Cup.

Team	Conference	Division	2011 Division Place	2011 Playoff results
Michigan Bucks	Central	Great Lakes	Champion	Conference Runner-up
Chicago Fire Premier	Central	Great Lakes	Runner-up	Conference Semi-finalist
Des Moines Menace	Central	Heartland	Runner-up	Conference Semi-finalist
Real Colorado Foxes	Central	Heartland	Third	Did Not Participate
Long Island Rough Riders	Eastern	Mid Atlantic	Champion	Conference Champion
Carolina Dynamo	Eastern	South Atlantic	Champion	Conference Semi-finalist
GPS Portland Phoenix	Eastern	Northeast	Champion	Qualified
Reading United A.C.	Eastern	Mid Atlantic	Runner-up	Qualified
Laredo Heat	Southern	Mid South	Champion	Conference Champion, League Runner-up
El Paso Patriots	Southern	Mid South	Runner-up	Conference Semi-finalist
Mississippi Brilla	Southern	Southeast	Champion	Conference Runner-up
Orlando City U-23	Southern	Southeast	Runner-up	Conference Semi-finalist
Kitsap Pumas	Western	Northwest	Champion	Conference Champion, League Champion
Portland Timbers U23's	Western	Northwest	Fourth	Did Not Participate
Fresno Fuego	Western	Southwest	Champion	Conference Runner-up
Ventura County Fusion	Western	Southwest	Champion	Conference Semi-finalist

== National Premier Soccer League ==
Six and a half spots in the main tournament proper have been allocated to NPSL clubs. The half spot will be contested against the winner of the US Club Soccer Final in a play-in game.

== USASA ==
For the United States Adult Soccer Association, a total of nine teams will earn berths into the first round proper of the Open Cup. These nine berths will be determined through regional tournaments. The participants of these tournaments are determined through the respective region's state or subregional cup champions, which began as early as October 2011 and run through March 2012. Throughout March and April 2012, the regional cups will be played to determine regional co-champions, and the USASA's representatives into the Open Cup.

=== Region I ===
The semifinal winners, NY Greek American Atlas aka Greek American AA and Dulles Sportsplex Aegean Hawks, both qualified for the Cup. Additionally, Jersey Shore Boca, the winner of the third place match also qualified for the Cup.

=== Region II ===
Six teams were involved in the 2012 USASA Region II National Cup which also determined which 2 teams from Region II would qualify for the Cup. A blind draw determined that the winner of the Cincy Saints vs KC Athletics match would qualify for the cup; thus KC Athletics earned the first berth. A 4 team single elimination competition was played between the remaining 4 teams and the Croatian Eagles earned the second berth for Region II with two 2–0 victories.

=== Region III ===
Region 3 Men's Open Competition was held in Houston Texas at the Houston Amateur Sports Park April 27–29, 2012. Eight teams played matches in two groups with the winner of each group securing a place in the Open Cup representing Region III. ASC New Stars and NTX Rayados won their group and qualified for the Cup.

=== Region IV ===
U.S. Soccer gave Region IV a waiver to the qualifying deadline of April 29; therefore, the U.S. Adult Soccer Association's Region IV championship tournament qualified the top team from each of 2 groups which played May 4–5. PSA Elite and Cal FC won their groups and qualified for the Cup, with PSA Elite also winning the Region IV championship match on May 6 and will represent Region IV at the 2012 USASA National Cup.

== US Club Soccer ==
Stanislaus United Turlock Express of Turlock, California earned US Club Soccer's bid when they defeated the NPSL's Bay Area Ambassadors of Hayward, California in a play-in game on April 28.
