= Darryn T =

Association football club in Zimbabwe

Darryn T Football Club was an association football club based in Zvishavane, Zimbabwe. It competed in the Zimbabwean top flight.
