= John O'Hara (footballer, born 1981) =

Irish footballer and coach

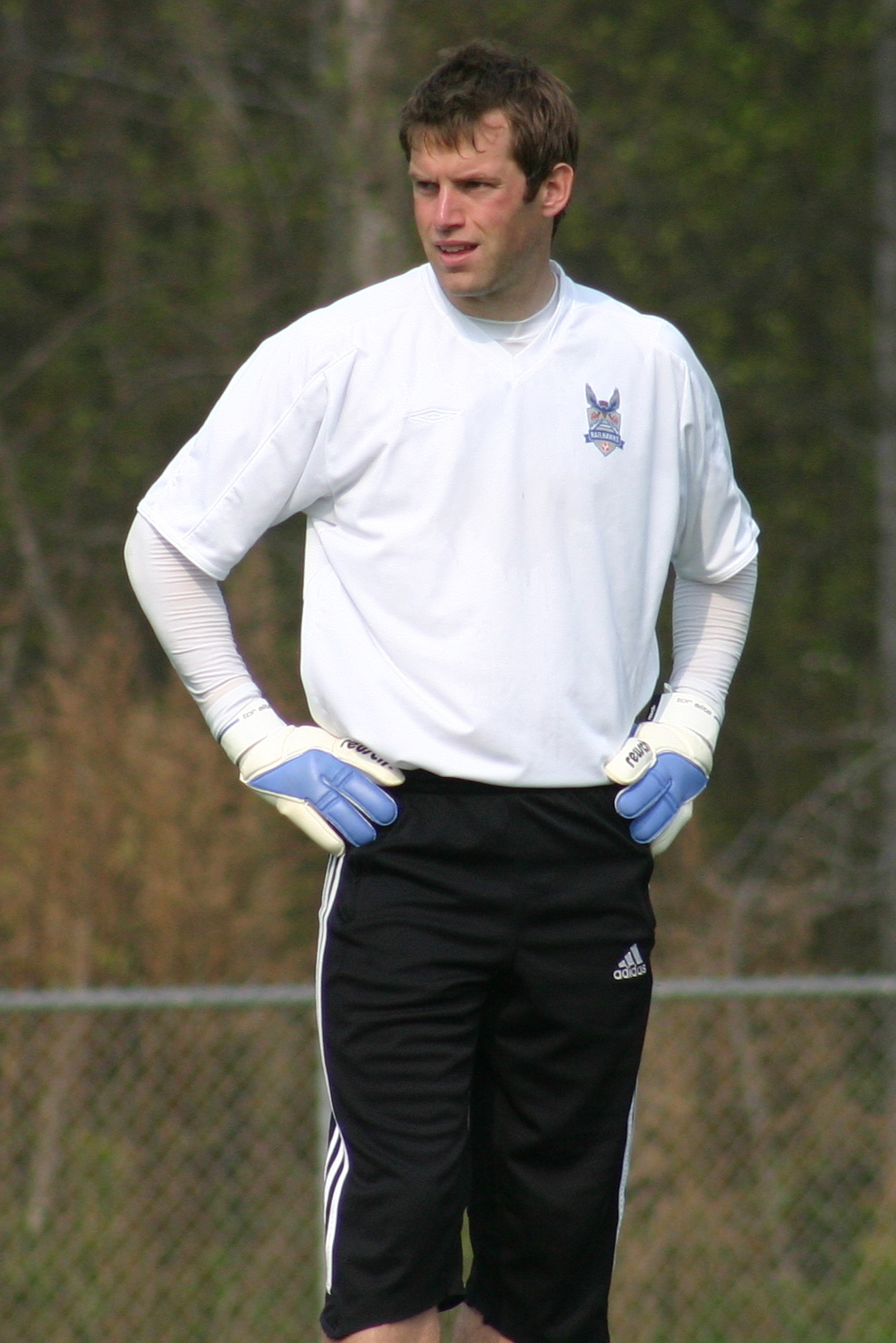

Personal information
- Full name: John Gerard O'Hara
- Date of birth: 18 April 1981 (age 45)
- Place of birth: Dublin, Ireland
- Position: Goalkeeper

Youth career
- Straide & Foxford United
- Belvedere
- Shelbourne
- 2001–2004: George Mason Patriots
- Richmond Kickers Future

Senior career*
Years	Team	Apps	(Gls)
2005–06	Sligo Rovers	70	(0)
2007	Carolina RailHawks	3	(0)
2008	Wilmington Hammerheads	20	(0)

International career
- Republic of Ireland U18

Managerial career
- 2009–: George Mason Patriots (assistant)
- * Club domestic league appearances and goals

John Gerard O'Hara (born 18 April 1981, Dublin) is an Irish association football player, currently assistant coach for the George Mason University soccer teams.

== Youth ==
O'Hara, who grew up in Foxford, County Mayo. He represented the Republic of Ireland at U-18 level and played for Belvedere. He attended college in the States at George Mason University where he was a four-year starter, four time all CAA conference team (2001–04), CAA Rookie of the Year (2001), and set many GMU school records.

== Professional ==
O'Hara was invited to the MLS Combine after his final season at GMU but signed with Sligo Rovers in his native Ireland for the 2005 campaign. He helped guide Rovers to the Eircom Irish First Division crown and promotion to the Premier League in his first season. O'Hara has previously played in the United Soccer Leagues as a member of the Richmond Kickers Future PDL side where he earned 2003 Goalkeeper of the Year honors and All PDL League Team honors. O'Hara was one of the first players to sign with the expansion Carolina RailHawks. During the 2007 season, O'Hara saw time in only three league games and left the RailHawks at the end of the season. O'Hara signed with the Wilmington Hammerheads of the USL Second Division in the spring of 2008 where he served as captain of the team

O'Hara finished the 2008 season with DC United of the MLS, seeing time with their Reserve team.
