= Casey Schmidt =

American soccer player (born 1981)

Personal information
- Date of birth: June 16, 1981 (age 45)
- Place of birth: United States
- Position: Forward

College career
Years	Team	Apps	(Gls)
- Boston College

Senior career*
Years	Team	Apps	(Gls)
2003	Colorado Rapids	13	(0)
- * Club domestic league appearances and goals

Casey Schmidt (born 16 June 1981) is an American retired soccer player.

== Career ==
In the summer of 2000, Schmidt trained with a professional team in Brazil.

In 2003, he was drafted by Colorado Rapids in the MLS and scored 9 goals in preseason. However, he failed to score in 13 league appearances that year and was released at the end of the season.
