= Adrienne Francis =

Australian journalist and broadcaster

- Born: Adrienne Francis; 1978 (age 47–48); Sydney, New South Wales
- Occupations: Journalist, broadcaster, presenter
- Years active: 2003–present
- Notable credit: ABC News (2010–)

Adrienne Francis (born 1978) is an Australian journalist, broadcaster and presenter on ABC.

== Early life ==
Francis grew up in Sydney and spent considerable time in Jindabyne in the Snowy Mountains of New South Wales. Adrienne attended the University of Sydney, reading agricultural science before launching her career in media.

== Career ==
Francis has worked for the ABC since 2003 in TV and Radio News. She was initially posted in the Northern Territory, where she was a rural reporter based in Katherine, before moving to Darwin to host the Northern Territory Country Hour. In 2006 she won the ABC Local Radio's Rural Reporter of the Year.

Francis has worked at ABC Canberra since 2010, where she presents the ABC's flagship TV and Radio News bulletins in the ACT and writes for their digital news service. She has also worked as a television current affairs reporter for 7.30 ACT, which was one of Canberra's most popular TV programs.
