= Ros Childs =

British journalist

- Born: England, United Kingdom
- Occupations: Journalist, TV presenter
- Employer: Australian Broadcasting Corporation
- Known for: ABC News (Australia)

Ros Childs (born in 1956) is an English-born TV journalist based in Australia, with a focus on business matters. After working primarily in her native UK for the ITV Network, Childs moved to Australia and joined the Australian Broadcasting Corporation (ABC) as a newsreader.

== Career ==
=== United Kingdom ===
Childs began her career as a print journalist with the Financial Times. Subsequently, she was employed at CNBC Europe as a reporter and presenter.

She was best known as the business correspondent for ITV News as well as the lunchtime and weekend news presenter. She was also one of the launch presenters on the ITV News Channel, which was known as the ITN News Channel from its launch on 1 August 2000 until September 2002. She also worked as a reporter at Sky News, on Channel 4 business documentaries and on BBC World.

=== Australia ===
Childs joined the ABC as a news reporter before taking over from Chris Clarke in 2005 as the presenter of the revamped Midday Report, a national weekday news bulletin with a special focus on business, between 12:00 noon and 1:00 pm.

As of 2018, she hosts the hours of live news from 12:00 pm to 3:00 pm weekdays on the ABC News channel.

She has had stints as the fill-in presenter on Lateline as well as fill-in business editor on The 7.30 Report.

== Personal life ==
Childs lives in Sydney with her Australian husband, Sean Mulcahy, a television cameraman producer.

Media offices
Preceded by Chris Clarke	ABC News at Noon; Presenter; February 2005 – present	Succeeded by Incumbent
