= Enrique Camarena =

Enrique Camarena may refer to:

- Enrique Camarena Robles (born 1957), Mexican psychiatrist
- Enrique Camarena (DEA agent) (1947–1985), Special Agent, United States Drug Enforcement Administration (DEA)
- Enrique Camarena (sport shooter) (born 1938), Spanish Olympic sports shooter
