= Scott Palguta =

American soccer player and coach (born 1982)

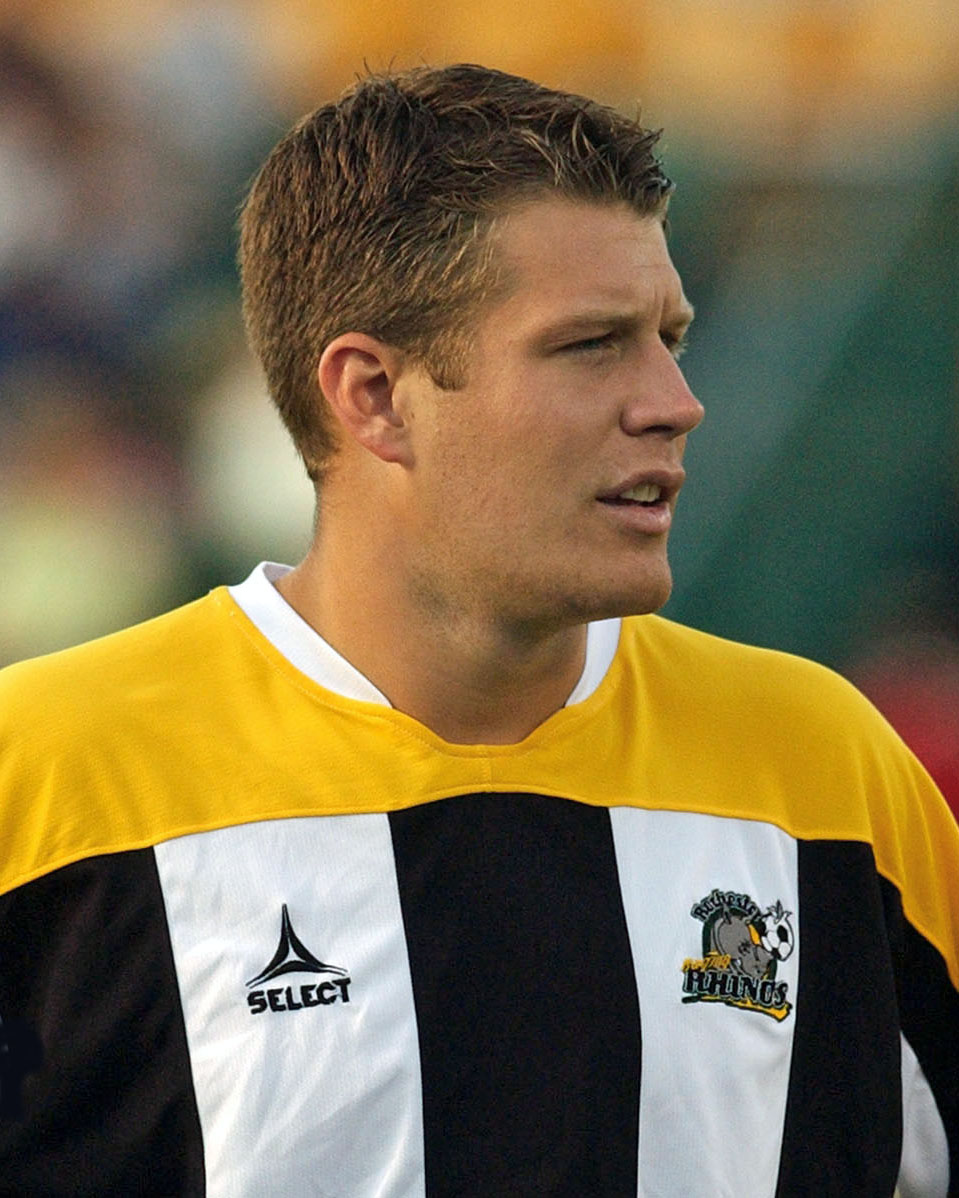

Personal information
- Full name: Scott Thomas Palguta
- Date of birth: August 23, 1982 (age 44)
- Place of birth: Toms River, New Jersey, U.S.
- Height: 6 ft 2 in (1.88 m)
- Position: Defender

Youth career
- 2001–2004: Cornell Big Red

Senior career*
Years	Team	Apps	(Gls)
2002–2004	Cape Cod Crusaders	75	(8)
2005–2008	Rochester Rhinos	125	(5)
2009–2012	Colorado Rapids	50	(2)

Managerial career
- 2015–: Colorado College Tigers
- * Club domestic league appearances and goals as of October 31, 2012

Scott Thomas Palguta (born August 23, 1982) is an American former soccer player. He was named the head men's soccer coach at Colorado College on February 6, 2015.

== Career ==
=== Youth and college ===
Born in Toms River, New Jersey, Palguta graduated from Monsignor Donovan High School in 2001 where he lettered for four years in soccer, basketball (shooting guard 17ppg) and track (miler and hurdler). In his senior year, he was named the team MVP in all three sports and was awarded the NJSIAA Scholar-Athlete Award. Palguta graduated ninth in his class and was highly recruited by several NCAA soccer programs.

Palguta played with the New Jersey ODP (Olympic Development Program) from 1994 to 2002 including the Region I Team from 1999 to 2002. The ODP competition took him to Morocco, the Netherlands, Switzerland, France and Belgium. During the later years, he was moved from the midfield to the backfield due to his size and speed. He was an Adidas ESP Nominee in 2000 and was named an Adidas All-American in 2001.

Palguta played college soccer at Cornell University from 2001 to 2004 under the tutelage of head coach Bryan Scales. He was named to the All-Ivy Team twice, once as a freshman and again as a senior. Palguta led the team in scoring as a junior and was named Captain in his final year. Already a professional soccer player commuting daily between Rochester and Ithaca, New York, he graduated in 2005 with a B.S. in Hotel Administration.

Palguta also played for the Cape Cod Crusaders of the USL Premier Development League from 2002 to 2004. He won back-to-back national championships in 2002 and 2003 and tallied the game-winning assist in the 2003 contest. He was named Captain and led the team to the national semifinal game in 2004.

=== Professional ===
Palguta was drafted by the Rochester Raging Rhinos in March 2005 in the second round of the USL First Division College Draft. With the help of his agent, David-Ross Williamson, he signed his first professional contract as a college senior. Despite the difficult task of balancing professional soccer with his studies at Cornell, Palguta impressed former Rhinos Head Coach Laurie Calloway during his rookie pre-season and immediately earned a starting position at left back. He scored his first professional goal against the MetroStars on August 3, 2005, during the Third Round of the 2005 Lamar Hunt U.S. Open Cup. Palguta was the unanimous choice for "Rookie of the Year" honors in 2005, led all players in minutes played in 2006 and 2007, received All-League honors in 2008 and was named to the USL 1st Division Team Of The Week nine times in his brief USL career.

Palguta was drafted by the New Jersey Ironmen as their second pick in the second round of the 2007 Major Indoor Soccer League (MISL) Draft held on July 12, 2007. He passed on the opportunity, however, and opted to play with the New York Red Bulls' Reserve Division for the remainder of the season.

Palguta came close to breaking into Major League Soccer (MLS) twice before. He was a trialist in 2007 with Real Salt Lake and was the last player cut prior to the start of the season. In 2008, he accepted an invitation to join the Red Bulls as a trialist; however, despite being offered a contract, the Rhinos refused to negotiate a transfer and Palguta was forced to return to Rochester for the 2008 season.

After some pre-season training with New York in 2009, Palguta returned to Rochester to prepare for the upcoming season. Less than 24 hours later, however, Colorado Rapids called and Palguta was en route to Denver. With only four days remaining to opt out of his USL-1 contract, and having been claimed as a Discovery Player by Colorado, Palguta signed with Rapids on March 11, 2009.

Palguta was a member of the Rapids team that won MLS Cup by defeating FC Dallas 2–1 on November 21, 2010, at BMO Field, Toronto, Canada He was released by Colorado on November 16, 2012. but opted out of the 2012 MLS Re-Entry Draft after accepting the position of Assistant Men's Soccer Coach at Colorado College, Colorado Springs, CO.

=== Coaching ===
After two years as the Assistant Men's Soccer Coach at Colorado College, Colorado Springs, CO, Palguta was named the third Head Coach in program history by Athletics Director Ken Ralph on Feb. 6, 2015. He was named Coach of the Year in November 2019 after only five seasons at the helm, joining two-time recipient Horst Richardson as CC coaches to be honored by their conference peers. Palguta (68–22–10) guided the Tigers to a No. 22 ranking in the final United Soccer Coaches Division III National Rankings, the finals of the Southern Collegiate Athletic Conference Tournament and his first appearance in the NCAA Division III Men's Soccer Tournament in 2019.

== Honors ==
Cape Cod Crusaders

- USL Premier Development League Championship: 2002, 2003

Rochester Raging Rhinos

- Rookie Of The Year: 2005
- USL First Division All-League Selection: 2008
- USL Coaches Performance Award: 2008

Colorado Rapids

- Major League Soccer Eastern Conference Championship: 2010
- Major League Soccer MLS Cup Championship: 2010

Colorado College Tigers

- Southern Collegiate Athletic Conference Men's Soccer Coach Of The Year: 2019
