= Jersey Shore Boca =

- Full name: Jersey Shore Boca
- Nickname: Boca
- Founded: 2003
- Ground: Ocean County College
- Capacity: ????
- Chairman: (United States) Guy Lockwood
- League: USL Premier Development League
- 2003: 7th, Northeast Division
Home colours	Away colours

Jersey Shore Boca are an American soccer club based in Ocean County, New Jersey. In 2003, the club joined the USL Premier Development League (PDL), the fourth tier of the American Soccer Pyramid. After just one season, the team left the league due to financial reasons. They continue to play in the USASA.

They played their home games in the stadium at Ocean County College in the city of Toms River, New Jersey. The team’s colors were white, blue and yellow.

In 2012, Jersey Shore Boca became the first amateur club from New Jersey to qualify for the Lamar Hunt U.S. Open Cup in the modern pro-soccer era.

== Year-by-year ==
Year	Division	League	Reg. season	Playoffs	Open Cup
2003	4	USL PDL	7th, Northeast	Did not qualify	Did not qualify
2012	N/A	N/A	N/A	N/A	First Round

== Coaches ==
- David Vaudreuil (2003)
- John Rerup (2011)
- Mike McCullion (2012)

== Stadia ==
- Stadium at Ocean County College, Toms River, New Jersey 2003
