= South Academy of International Languages =

Public school in Charlotte, North Carolina

Coordinates: 35.140131723608235°N 80.89529547820949°W

Location
- 8300 Nations Ford Road; Charlotte, North Carolina; United States

Information
- Type: Public magnet school
- Motto: Creating Bright Futures in Six Languages
- Established: 1992
- School district: Charlotte-Mecklenburg Schools
- Principal: David Lynn
- Enrollment: 1300 students
- Colors: white and red
- Mascot: Phoenix
- Website: Official website

South Academy of International Languages, formerly known as E. E. Waddell Language Academy and Smith Academy of International Languages, is a public K-8 magnet school (elementary and middle language immersion school combined) in Charlotte, North Carolina, United States. It is part of the Charlotte-Mecklenburg School (CMS) District.

The school educates 1,257 students in grades K-8. In the 2022–23 school year, 804 students were enrolled in the elementary program (K-5) and 453 in the middle school (6–8).

In 2011, the school moved to the former E.E. Waddell High School and changed its name to E.E. Waddell Language Academy. In 2021, the school was moved to 8300 Nations Ford Road, and became South Academy of International Languages.

== Languages ==
Tracks using Chinese, French, German, or Japanese as the medium of instruction cover kindergarten through eighth grade, while the Spanish immersion track covers grades six through eight. Chinese, which the school began to offer in 2006–07, was the most recently added language. The program, in Mandarin, was first taught in kindergarten and first grade, growing a grade level each year.

Students recite the Pledge of Allegiance to the flag of the United States in both English and their language of instruction. Immersion classes feature cultural lessons in addition to language and subject teaching.

The school has effective relationships with universities in Germany and with the Visiting International Faculty program at the University of North Carolina at Chapel Hill. This provides the faculty with development opportunities and resources. Overseas teachers also spend time at the school on secondment.

== Achievements ==
In 2005, 96 percent of fifth-graders scored at grade level on North Carolina's annual testing program, despite being taught in a foreign language.
