= Greg Chevalier =

American soccer player and coach

Personal information
- Place of birth: Albany, New York, U.S.
- Height: 5 ft 10 in (1.78 m)
- Position: Midfielder

Youth career
- 1999–2002: University of Albany

Senior career*
Years	Team	Apps	(Gls)
2003	Albany Blackwatch Highlanders	14	(9)
2004	Pittsburgh Riverhounds	14	(0)
2005	Atlanta Silverbacks	21	(0)
2006	Pittsburgh Riverhounds	12	(0)
2006	Atlanta Silverbacks U23s	4	(0)
2008	Atlanta Silverbacks	16	(0)
- * Club domestic league appearances and goals

Greg "Chevy" Chevalier is an American retired soccer midfielder who played professionally in the USL First Division.

== Player ==
Chevalier attended Monroe-Woodbury High School in Central Valley, New York. He then played college soccer at the University of Albany from 1999 to 2002. In 2003, Chevalier played as an amateur with the Albany Blackwatch Highlanders of the fourth division Premier Development League. He scored nine goals and was named to the All-PDL team. He began his professional career in 2004 with the Pittsburgh Riverhounds in the USL Second Division. On April 9, 2005, the Silverbacks announced the signing of Chevalier. In April 2006, the Silverbacks released Chevalier during the preseason. He then signed with the Riverhounds. He also played four games for the Atlanta Silverbacks U23s of the PDL. In 2007, he took the season off after getting married. In April 2008, Chevalier returned to professional soccer with the Atlanta Silverbacks.

== Coach ==
Chevalier began coaching in 2000 and has held positions at the high school and Super Y-League levels. He currently is located in Atlanta, GA coaching for Atlanta Spurs FC alongside Ted Macdougall and Paul Smith.
