= Rhode Island Stingrays =

- Full name: Rhode Island Stingrays
- Nickname: The Stingrays
- Founded: 1995
- Dissolved: 2009
- Ground: Robert J. Black Stadium
- Capacity: 1,500
- Owner: (Portugal) Mario Pereira
- Head Coach: (Portugal) Mario Pereira
- League: USL Premier Development League
- 2009: 6th, Northeast did not qualify for playoffs
Home colors	Away colors

Rhode Island Stingrays was an American soccer team based in Providence, Rhode Island, United States. Founded in 1995, the team played in the USL Premier Development League (PDL), the fourth tier of the American Soccer Pyramid, until 2009, after which the franchise folded and the team left the league.

The team played its home games at Robert J. Black Stadium on the campus of Rhode Island College. The team's colors were blue, white and yellow.

== Year-by-year ==
Year	Division	League	Regular season	Playoffs	Open Cup
1995	3	USISL Pro League	5th, Coastal	Did not qualify	Did not qualify
1996	3	USISL Pro League	3rd, Northeast	Conference Semifinals	Did not qualify
1996/97	N/A	USISL I-League	2nd, East	Did not qualify	N/A
1997	3	USISL D-3 Pro League	2nd, Northeast	Division Semifinals	First Round
1998	3	USISL D-3 Pro League	1st, Northeast	Division Finals	Did not qualify
1999	3	USL D-3 Pro League	9th, Northern	Did not qualify	Did not qualify
2000	3	USL D-3 Pro League	8th, Northern	Did not qualify	Did not qualify
2001	3	USL D-3 Pro League	5th, Northern	Did not qualify	Did not qualify
2002	4	USL PDL	3rd, Northeast	Did not qualify	Did not qualify
2003	4	USL PDL	4th, Northeast	Did not qualify	Did not qualify
2004	4	USL PDL	4th, Northeast	Did not qualify	Did not qualify
2005	4	USL PDL	7th, Northeast	Did not qualify	Did not qualify
2006	4	USL PDL	3rd, New England	Did not qualify	Did not qualify
2007	4	USL PDL	8th, Northeast	Did not qualify	Did not qualify
2008	4	USL PDL	5th, New England	Did not qualify	Did not qualify
2009	4	USL PDL	6th, Northeast	Did not qualify	Did not qualify

== Honors ==
- USISL D-3 Pro League Northeast Division Champion 1998

== Head coaches ==
- (Portugal) Mario Pereira (2003–2009)

== Stadia ==
- Pierce Memorial Field; East Providence, Rhode Island (2003–2008)
- Stadium at Kickemuit middle school; Warren, Rhode Island, 1 game (2005)
- Robert J. Black Stadium; Providence, Rhode Island, (2006, 2009)
- Stadium at Bryant University; Smithfield, Rhode Island, 1 game (2007)

== Average attendance ==
Attendance stats are calculated by averaging each team's self-reported home attendances from the historical match archive at https://web.archive.org/web/20100105175057/http://www.uslsoccer.com/history/index_E.html, and at Kenn.com https://kenn.com/blog/soccer/all-time-usl-league-two-attendance/, https://kenn.com/blog/soccer/all-time-usl-third-division-attendance/.

- 1995: NA
- 1996: 700
- 1997: 1,452 Playoffs: 1,505 Overall: 1,456
- 1998: 1,213 Playoffs: 1,368 Overall: 1,237
- 1999: 730
- 2000: 624
- 2001: 731
- 2002: 410 (14th in PDL)
- 2003: 632 (13th in PDL)
- 2004: 257 (37th in PDL)
- 2005: 332 (27th in PDL)
- 2006: 310 (29th in PDL)
- 2007: 305 (34th in PDL)
- 2008: 297 (39th in PDL)
- 2009: 181 (53rd in PDL)
