= Jason Hotchkin =

American soccer player

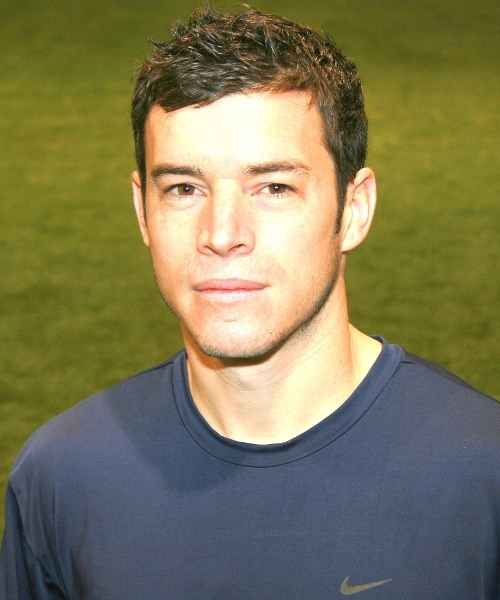

Personal information
- Date of birth: June 5, 1978 (age 48)
- Place of birth: Kalamazoo, Michigan, United States
- Height: 6 ft 0 in (1.83 m)
- Positions: Midfielder; forward

Youth career
- 2000: Milligan Buffalo
- 2001–2003: Biola Eagles

Senior career*
Years	Team	Apps	(Gls)
1999	South Carolina Shamrocks	33	(19)
2001–2003	Southern California Seahorses	58	(31)
2004	Charlotte Eagles	17	(5)
2005	TuS Koblenz	0	(0)
2005	IK Brage	15	(0)
2005	Orange County Blue Star	2	(2)
2006	Wilmington Hammerheads	7	(1)
2006–2007	Philadelphia KiXX (indoor)		
2007–2008	New Jersey Ironmen (indoor)		
2008–2009	Cleveland City Stars	27	(4)
2010–2011	Harrisburg City Islanders	42	(8)
- * Club domestic league appearances and goals as of September 4, 2013

Jason Hotchkin (born June 5, 1978, in Kalamazoo, Michigan) is an American former professional soccer player.

== Career ==
=== College and amateur ===
Hotchkin had already played one year of professional soccer for the South Carolina Shamrocks in the USL D3 Pro League as an 18-year-old in 1997, prior to him attending college. He had a brief spell with St. Patrick's Athletic in the League of Ireland, playing several reserve league matches, and spent several months with training Cruz Azul in Mexico, but was not offered a contract.

He played college soccer at Milligan College, and then at Biola University in La Mirada, California, where he was named to the all-Golden State Athletic Conference team as a senior in 2003 when he registered 11 goals and a team-high 7 assists.

During his college years Hotchkin also played with the Southern California Seahorses of the USL Premier Development League, scoring 31 goals and 15 assists in 58 matches played over the course of three seasons, and being voted to the PDL Team for the Year in 2003.

=== Professional ===
In 2004 Hotchkin signed with Charlotte Eagles of the USL Pro Soccer League He appeared in 15 matches recording 5 goals and 4 assists. Charlotte finished league runner-up by losing on penalties to the Utah Blitz. In 2005, after a largely unsuccessful stint with German club TuS Koblenz he moved to Sweden to play for IK Brage playing 15 matches. In 2006, he returned to the USL. He played 7 matches with the Wilmington Hammerheads scoring 2 times and recording 3 assists.

He spent two years playing in the Major Indoor Soccer League, with Philadelphia KiXX in 2006-07 and the New Jersey Ironmen in 2007–08, winning the MISL championship with Philadelphia.

Hotchkin joined the Cleveland City Stars late in the summer of 2008, helping them win the USL Second Division championship. In seven matches he scored twice and had 4 assists, and re-signed with the team for their inaugural USL First Division campaign in 2009. In 2010, he moved to Harrisburg to play for the Islanders racking in 6 goals and 3 assists. He currently serves as the City Islanders Director of Player Development for their academy teams. He also spent some time playing with Major League Soccer side Columbus Crew's reserve team in 2008.

Hotchkin re-signed with Harrisburg on April 7, 2011.
