= Charlotte Eagles =

American professional soccer club

- Full name: Charlotte Eagles Soccer Club
- Nickname: Eagles
- Founded: 1991; 35 years ago
- Stadium: Sportsplex at Matthews; Matthews, North Carolina
- Capacity: 2,300
- President: David Urban
- Head Coach: Chris McClellan
- League: USL League Two
- 2025: 6th, South Atlantic Division; Playoffs: DNQ
- Website: charlotteeagles.com
Home colors	Away colors

The Charlotte Eagles is an American amateur soccer team based in Charlotte, North Carolina, United States. Founded in 1991, the team plays in USL League Two, the fourth tier of the American Soccer Pyramid.

The team plays its home games at the Sportsplex at Matthews. The team's colors are orange, white and blue.

== History ==
Founded in 1991 as the Charlotte Eagles Soccer Club, the team turned professional when it entered the USISL in 1993. The Eagles enjoyed a brief spell in the A-League before financial troubles caused them to return to the lower level.

The Eagles are a division of Missionary Athletes International (MAI), an organization which undertakes sports ministry to share the message of Christianity through the environment of soccer. They are a sister organisation of the USL League Two side Southern California Eagles, and also field a women's team – the Charlotte Lady Eagles – in the Women's Premier Soccer League.

=== Back to the PDL ===
In 2016 The Charlotte Eagles were profiled by Britain's The Guardian newspaper. The piece highlighted the team's policy of discrimination against openly gay and bisexual players.

== Stadiums ==
Stadium	Location	Term	Notes
Patten Stadium (Charlotte Latin School)	Charlotte	1998–1999	One game in 2012
Irwin Belk Track and Field Center/Transamerica Field	Charlotte	2000–2002	One game in 2014
Waddell Stadium (E. E. Waddell High School)	Charlotte	2003–2007	
Panthers Stadium (Providence High School)	Charlotte	2003	Five games
Restart Field (Charlotte Christian School)	Charlotte	2008–2012; 2016–2017	
Eagle Field	Rock Hill	2011–2012	Two games
Manchester Meadows	Rock Hill	2012	One game
Dickson Field (Queens University of Charlotte)	Charlotte	2013–15	
Sportsplex at Matthews	Matthews	2017–present	
Nation Ford Stadium	Fort Mill	2019	One game
Guy Field (Charlotte Christian School)	Charlotte	2021–present	Secondary home

== Media ==
The Eagles receive written coverage from Charlotte's major daily newspaper The Charlotte Observer. Highlights are often shown on local news broadcasts. All games are shown live on the Charlotte Eagles official YouTube page. Harrison Raby is the play-by-play voice for home broadcasts.

== Players and staff ==
=== Staff ===
- (United States) David Urban – president
- (United States) Spencer Lewis – executive director
- (United States) Chris McClellan – head coach
- (United States) Walter Gomez – assistant coach

=== Head coaches ===
- (United States) Brian Davidson (1993–1996)
- (United States) Mark Steffens (1997–2014)
- (United States) Dave Dixon (2014–2017)
- (United States) Luke Helmuth (2017–2018)
- (United States) Garrett Bireline (2018-2020)
- (United States) Michael Kovach (2020–2024)
- (United States) Chris McClellan (2024–present)

== Achievements ==
- USISL Pro League
  - South Atlantic Division Champions: 1996
- USL D-3 Pro League
  - Champions: 2000
  - Atlantic Division Champions: 1999
- USL Pro Soccer League
  - Southern Division Champions: 2004
- USL Second Division
  - Champions: 2005
  - Regular Season Champions: 2008
- USL PRO
  - Championship Finalist: 2013
- Premier Development League
  - Champions: 2017
  - Eastern Conference Champions: 2017
  - South Atlantic Division Champions: (2) 2015, 2016
- Hank Steinbrecher Cup
  - Runner-up: 2018
- Southern Derby
  - Champions: (4) 2001, 2012, 2013, 2014

== Record ==
=== Year-by-year ===
Year	Division	League	Regular season	Playoffs	Open Cup
1993	N/A	USISL	8th, Atlantic	Did not qualify	Did not enter
1994	3	USISL	3rd, Atlantic	Divisional Finals	Did not enter
1995	3	USISL Pro League	2nd, Atlantic	Divisional Semifinals	Did not qualify
1996	3	USISL Pro League	1st, South Atlantic	Final	Did not qualify
1997	3	USISL D-3 Pro League	3rd, South Atlantic	Final	Did not qualify
1998	3	USISL D-3 Pro League	3rd, Atlantic	Quarterfinals	2nd Round
1999	3	USL D-3 Pro League	1st, Atlantic	Semifinals	Did not qualify
2000	3	USL D-3 Pro League	3rd, Southern	Champions	Did not qualify
2001	2	USL A-League	3rd, Central	1st Round	Did not qualify
2002	2	USL A-League	4th, Southeast	1st Round	Did not qualify
2003	2	USL A-League	4th, Southeast	Did not qualify	Did not qualify
2004	3	USL Pro Soccer League	1st, Southern	Final	2nd Round
2005	3	USL Second Division	2nd	Champions	3rd Round
2006	3	USL Second Division	2nd	Final	2nd Round
2007	3	USL Second Division	4th	Semifinals	2nd Round
2008	3	USL Second Division	1st	Final	2nd Round
2009	3	USL Second Division	4th	Final	1st Round
2010	3	USL Second Division	4th	Did not qualify	1st Round
2011	3	USL Pro	7th	Did not qualify	2nd Round
2012	3	USL Pro	7th	Did not qualify	Quarterfinals
2013	3	USL Pro	5th	Final	3rd Round
2014	3	USL Pro	12th	Did not qualify	3rd Round
2015	4	PDL	1st, South Atlantic	Conference Semifinals	Did not qualify
2016	4	PDL	1st, South Atlantic	Conference Semifinals	2nd Round
2017	4	PDL	2nd, South Atlantic	Champions	2nd Round
2018	4	PDL	4th, South Atlantic	Did not qualify	1st Round
2019	4	USL League Two	4th, Deep South	Did not qualify	Did not qualify
2020	4	USL League Two	Season cancelled due to COVID-19 pandemic		
2021	4	USL League Two	6th, Deep South	Did not qualify	Did not qualify
2022	4	USL League Two	3rd, South Atlantic	Did not qualify	Did not qualify
2023	4	USL League Two	2nd, South Atlantic	Conference Quarterfinals	Did not qualify
2024	4	USL League Two	4th, South Atlantic	Did not qualify	Did not qualify
2025	4	USL League Two	6th, South Atlantic	Did not qualify	Did not qualify
2026	4	USL League Two	6th, South Atlantic	Did not qualify	Did not qualify

Preceded by Michigan Bucks	Premier Development League Champion; 2017	Succeeded by Calgary Foothills FC
Preceded by Utah Blitzz	USL Second Division Champion; 2005	Succeeded by Richmond Kickers
Preceded by Western Mass Pioneers	USL Second Division Champion; 2000	Succeeded by Utah Blitzz
