= Houston Toros =

- Full name: Houston Toros
- Nickname: The Toros
- Founded: 2002
- Ground: 785 Country Place Drive, Houston, TX 77079
- Capacity: ????
- Chairman: Juan Giraldo
- Manager: Jonathan Giraldo
- League: USL Premier Development League
- 2003: 6th, Mid-South Division
Home colours	Away colours

Houston Toros were an American soccer team, founded in 2002, who were members of the United Soccer Leagues Premier Development League (PDL), the fourth tier of the American Soccer Pyramid, until 2003, after which the team left the league and the franchise was terminated. The Houston Toros returned as a brand in 2010 and is partnered with Link International Design

They played their home games primarily in the stadium at North Shore Senior High School in the city of Houston, Texas.

== Year-by-year ==
Year	Division	League	Reg. season	Playoffs	Open Cup
2002	4	USL PDL	6th, Mid-South	Did not qualify	Did not qualify
2003	4	USL PDL	6th, Mid-South	Did not qualify	Did not qualify

== Stadia ==
- Stadium at North Shore Senior High School, Houston, Texas 2003
- Freedom World Ranch, Houston, Texas 2003 (1 game)
- Mustang Soccer Complex, Houston, Texas 2003 (1 game)
