= Sabra Lane =

Australian journalist and radio presenter

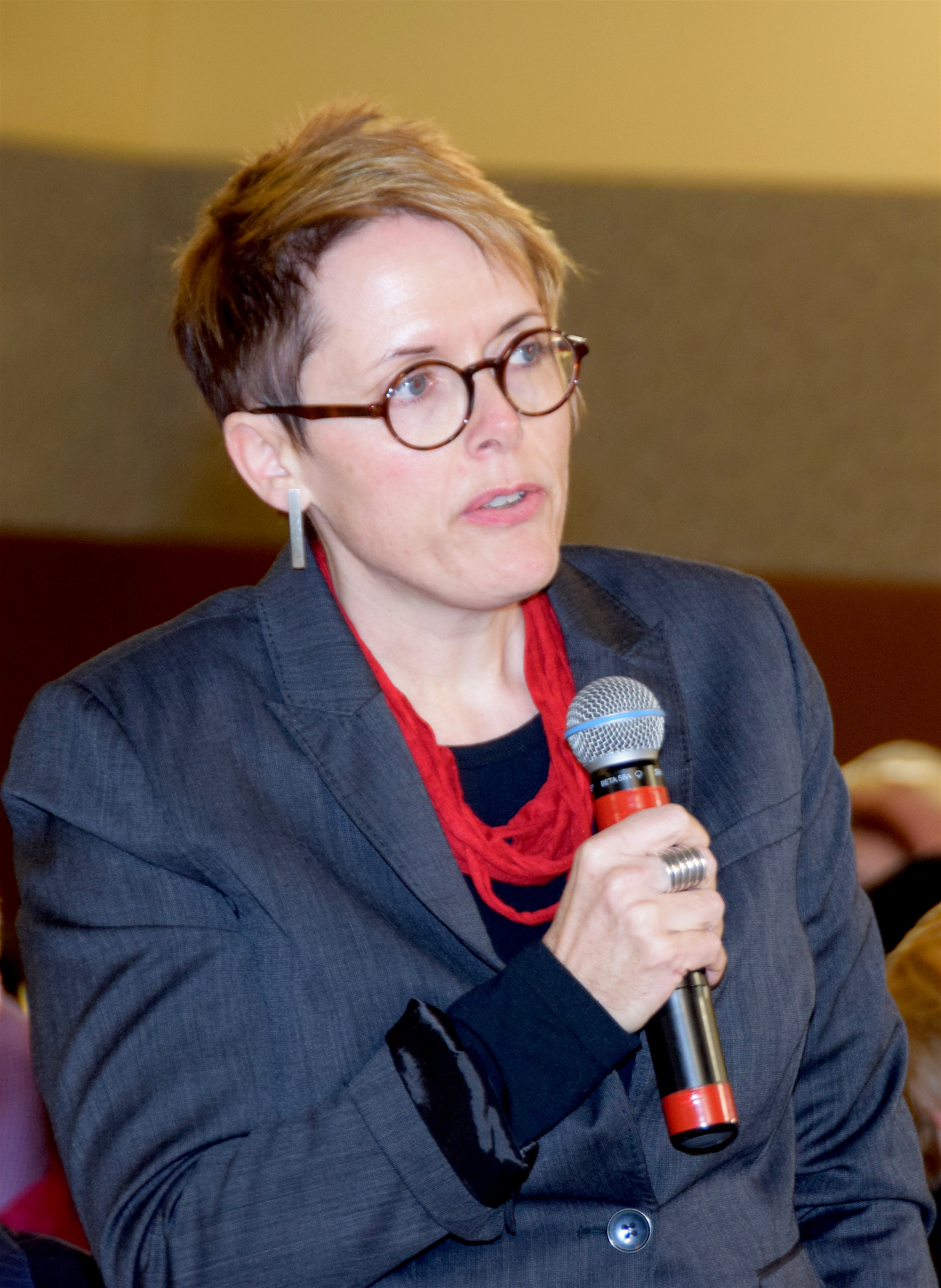
- Lane in 2015
- Born: 1968 (age 57–58); Melbourne, Victoria, Australia
- Occupation: Journalist
- Years active: 1989–present

Sabra Lane (born c.1968) is an Australian journalist and radio presenter. She is best known for her work at the Australian Broadcasting Corporation.

Lane currently presents ABC News Tasmania on weekends. Previously, Sabra hosted the AM current affairs program on ABC Local Radio and ABC Radio National from 2017 to 2025.

== Early life ==
Lane was born in Melbourne, Victoria, and grew up the regional city of Mildura where she attended Catholic school St Joseph's College.

After completing Year 12, Lane spent a year in Norway on a Rotary Youth Exchange program. She lived on an island on the southwest coast of the country and learnt to speak fluent Norwegian in the local dialect.

== Career ==
While studying on the Magill campus of the University of South Australia in Adelaide in the late 1980s, Lane worked at Network Ten's local television station where she was initially required to listen to police scanners on Friday and Saturday nights before becoming an assistant chief of staff for a year. Lane then worked as a reporter with the ABC station in Adelaide. In 1995, she transferred to the ABC's Sydney station where she became chief of staff of the newsroom.

From late 1997 to 2005, Lane worked for the Seven Network as a producer. She helped produce the network's coverage of the Sydney Olympics and served as the executive producer of Sunday Sunrise.

Lane returned to the ABC in 2006 to work for the network's radio current affairs department after studying an audio engineering course at night school.

In 2008, she moved to Canberra to work as a reporter in the press gallery at Parliament House, covering federal politics for ABC programs AM, The World Today and PM. During this time she was promoted to chief radio current affairs correspondent.

From 2013 to 2017, Lane was a political correspondent for ABC Television's 7.30 program, succeeding Chris Uhlmann.

In 2014, she was elected to the board of the National Press Club in 2014, becoming its president in February 2018. In 2019, she moderated a leader's debate at the National Press Club between prime minister Scott Morrison and Opposition leader Bill Shorten prior to the 2019 Australian federal election.

Lane moved back to radio in 2017 after she was named as the new host of AM, succeeding Michael Brissenden and taking over the show in its 50th year on air.

Lane received praise in 2019 for her raw emotional response live on air immediately following the broadcast of a story by foreign correspondent Samantha Hawley about a Ukrainian girl who was allegedly abandoned by her American surrogate parents. After the story had gone to air, Lane was overcome with emotion breaking down in tears while attempting to read that day's finance report.

In late 2020, Lane relocated to Tasmania where she continued to host AM from the studios of ABC Radio Hobart. She relinquished her position as president of the National Press Club prior to moving to Hobart.

In 2021, Lane commenced curating a fortnightly collection of stories for ABC viewers, listeners and readers called The Bright Side which uses constructive journalism to cover solution-focused news stories to provide "a broader picture" to "inspire, engage and create hope" aiming to balance out the large amount of negative conflict-based stories Australians are subject to in the traditional news cycle.

In 2022, Lane co-anchored ABC Radio's coverage of the 2022 Australian federal election with Rafael Epstein.

Lane has listed her two most memorable interviews from her career to date as being the ones she conducted with Barry Cohen about his struggle with Alzheimer's disease, and with Craig Laundy about his push for a change in government policy to enable more refugees into Australia.

Lane has lamented the loss of newspapers in many Australian towns and the subsequent loss of jobs in Australian journalism, describing it as "a huge tragedy". She said that "The diversity of views and, importantly, the basic requirement of factual and balanced news, has never been more critical in this era when so much false material and 'fake news' is circulating online. It is shocking that so many towns have lost their regular newspapers and sources of reliable information. It's also another reason why the ABC has never been more crucial. We can't possibly fill the void entirely, but we can help provide reliable, credible, and factual reporting to keep communities informed."

In December 2025, Lane announced she was stepping away from AM, concluding nine years as presenter. She will take extended leave before returning to a new role with the ABC.

In February 2026, ABC announced Lane will present ABC News Tasmania on weekends.

== Personal life ==
As a teenager, Lane was diagnosed with polyendocrine metabolic ovarian syndrome (PMOS), formerly known as polycystic ovarian syndrome (PCOS), and was incorrectly told by a doctor that she would be unable to have children despite many women being able to do so with the help of fertility treatment, a fact that she did not learn until much later in life. Lane joined the committee of the Polycystic Ovarian Syndrome Association of Australia in 2004, eventually becoming president. She has also been diagnosed with supraventricular tachycardia.
