= Eleanor Hall =

Australian journalist and presenter

Eleanor Hall is an Australian journalist and presenter.

== Career ==
Eleanor Hall studied arts/law at the University of Sydney and graduated with first class honours in history. She was awarded a Harkness fellowship in 1986. In the US, she worked in documentaries at WGBH TV in Boston and graduated with a master's degree in Journalism from New York's Columbia University.

In 1990, she joined the Australian Broadcasting Corporation. She has reported and presented for The Drum, ABC News, The 7:30 Report, Lateline, Foreign Correspondent and ABC Radio Current Affairs.

Hall has travelled extensively in her career taking her to Boston, Mexico, Nicaragua, Cuba, Guatemala, United Kingdom, Hungary, Thailand, the Philippines, India and back to New York.

In 1998, she was the ABC's Washington correspondent covering the Clinton impeachment. Closer to home, Hall worked for five years as a television reporter in the Canberra Parliamentary Press Gallery for Lateline and The 7:30 Report.

Hall has also reported for television news and current affairs from Sydney and Darwin prior to joining the ABC and while still a university student, she was a scriptwriter on the documentary, Chile Hasta Cuando, which won the Brazilian and Cuban film festival awards. She also freelanced for National Public Radio in the United States.

In 2000, Hall joined ABC Radio's current affairs reporting team serving AM, PM and The World Today. After a short break for maternity leave, she took up her current position as presenter of The World Today.

In 2009, she won a scholarship to the UK where she completed a term at Oxford University's Reuters Institute for the Study of Journalism and submitted a paper on politics in the YouTube age, focusing on the Obama e-campaign.

In 2012, she won the European Union Journalist scholarship and reported on cloud technology challenges in the EU.

In 2012, she was asked to become a member of the Australia America Leadership dialogue.

== See also ==
- ABC World Today Bio
