= Warwick Hadfield =

Australian sports journalist

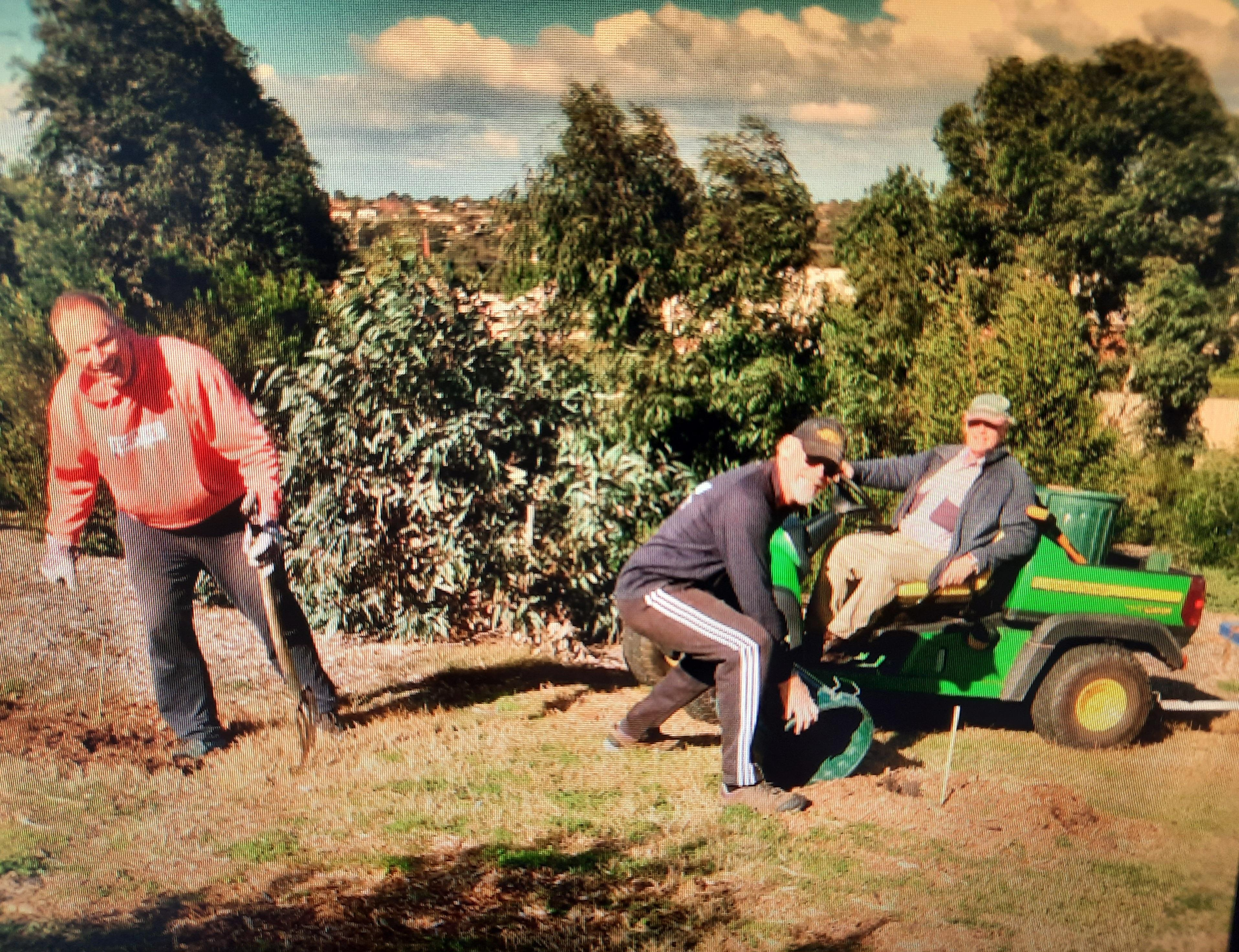

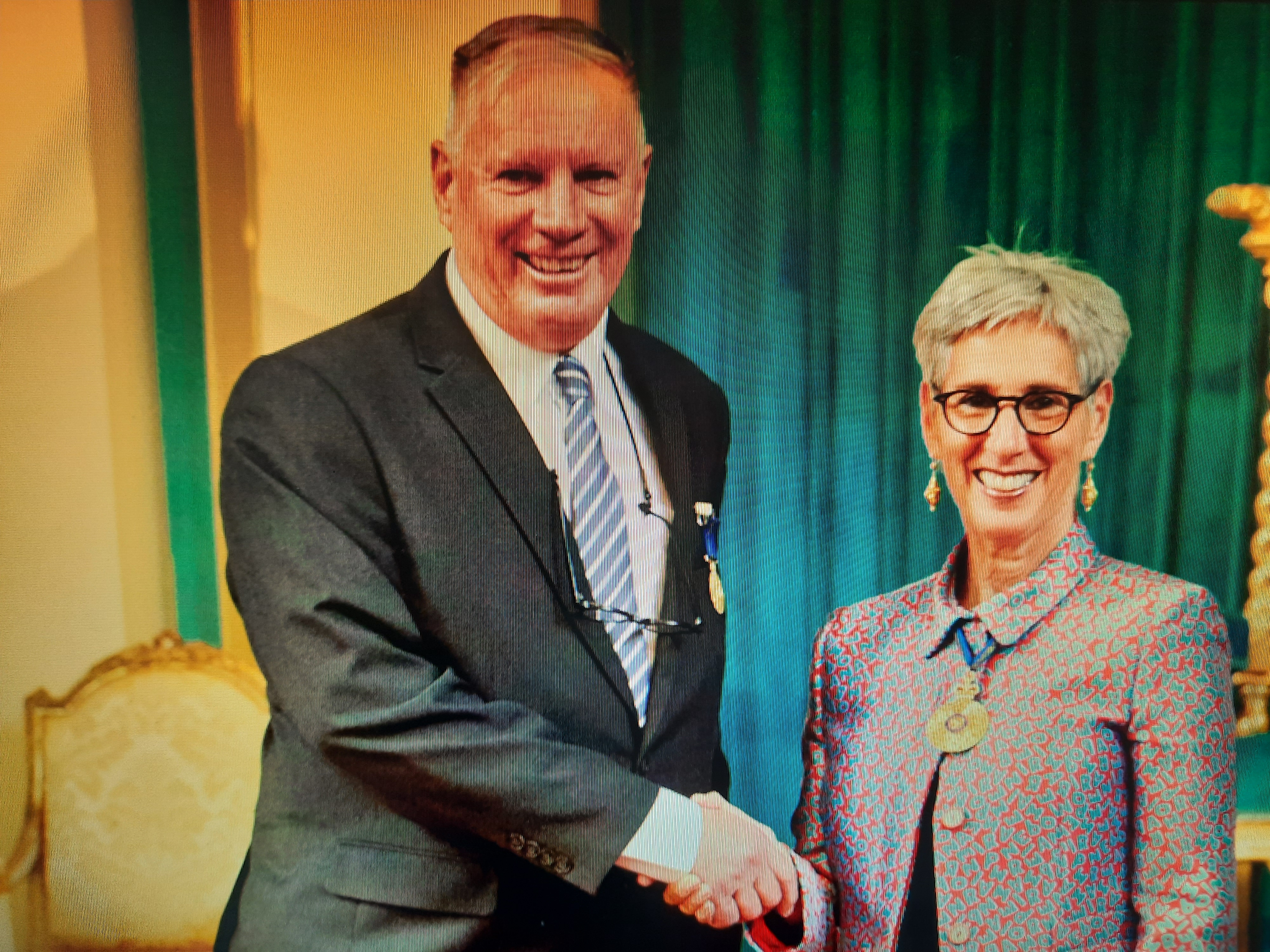

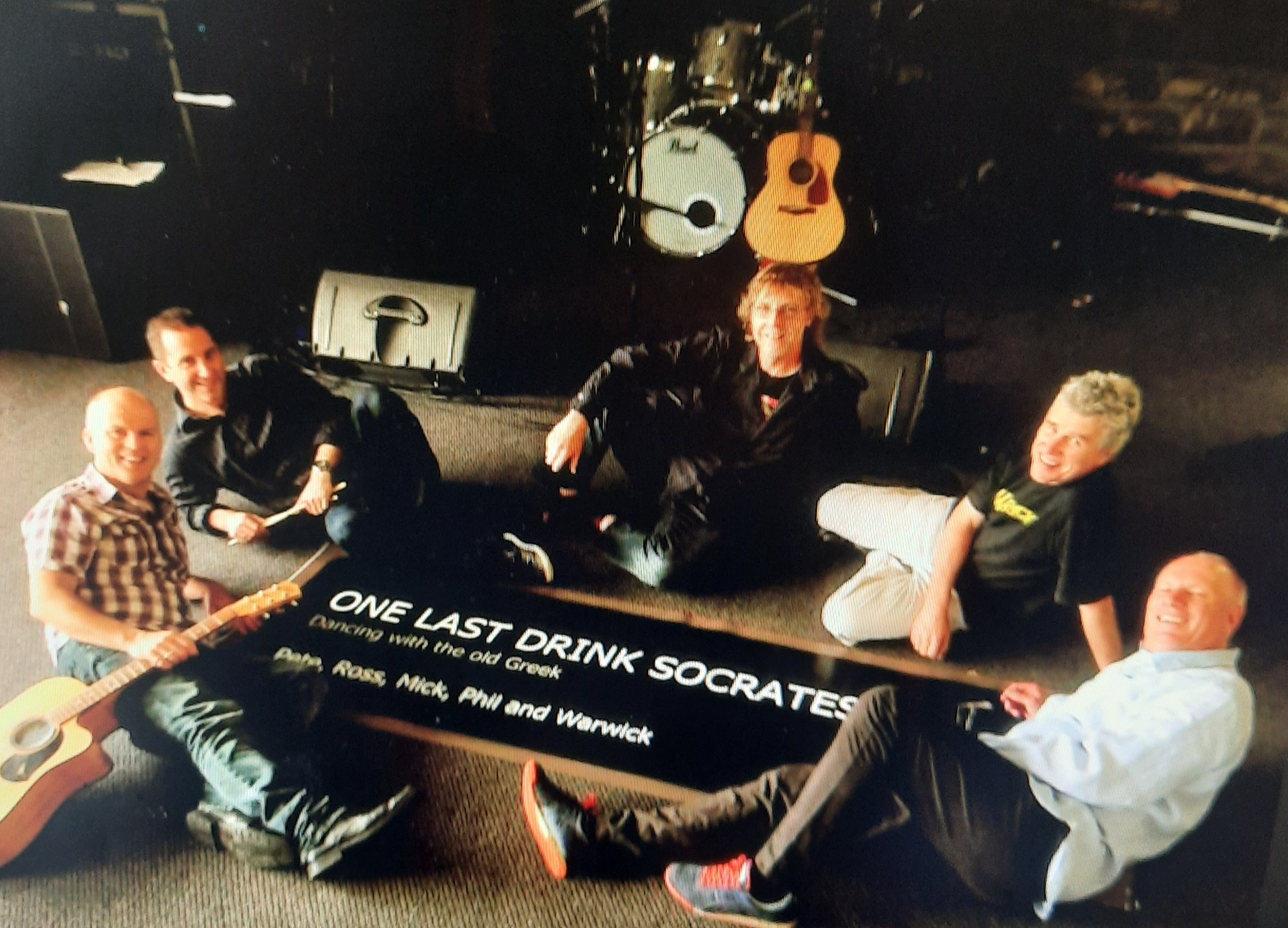

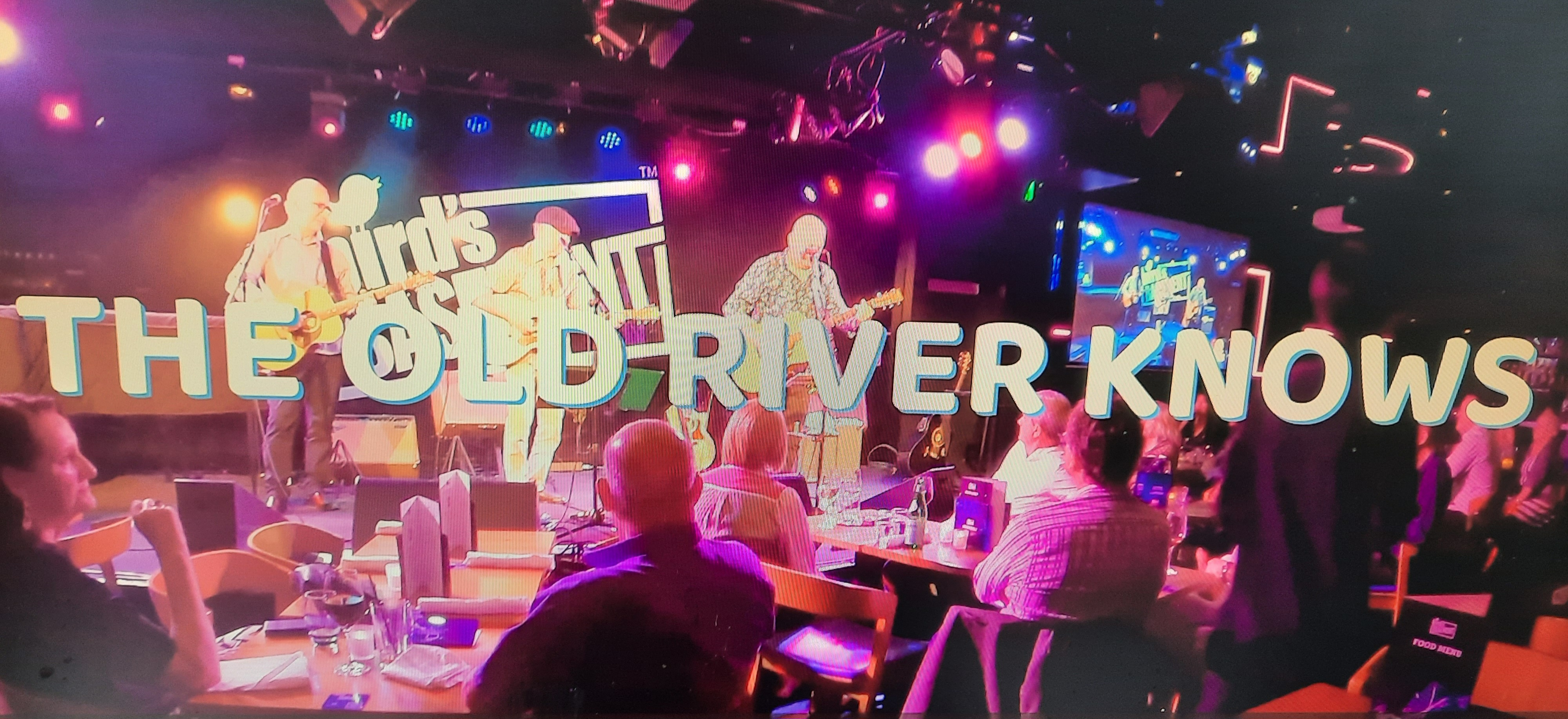
Field, See and Mason performing The Old River Knows At Bird's Basement, Melbourne

Warwick John Hadfield is an Australian sports journalist, songwriter, playwright, author and poet.

Hadfield was born in Sydney in 1952. He lived and worked there until when in 1989 he moved to Tasmania where he worked with The Mercury newspaper as sports editor, Hydro Tasmania in media and public relations and then the ABC. In 1997, he moved from Tasmania to Geelong when his wife Alison Hadfield took up a senior management role at Deakin University where with Professor Pip Hamilton she helped create and raise the university's research profile. Warwick Hadfield also worked as a consultant to Deakin Research, helping create an industry leading website and working as media adviser to emerging and established researchers.

Before working in the media, and after completing high school at Richmond High School in New South Wales in 1970, Hadfield spent 10 years working in the New South Wales public service, primarily the Petty Sessions Branch of the Justice Department and gaining internal legal qualifications. His love of sport and writing drew Hadfield to working for local Sutherland Shire newspapers and the AAP, covering grade cricket in Sydney. He moved to England and worked on Fleet Street, mainly for The Daily Telegraph covering sport. On returning to Australia, Hadfield was employed as a journalist with The Australian in the 1980s and early 1990s and held the positions of Chief of Staff, Editorial Writer and Chief Sports Correspondent. He covered major international sporting events involving Australian athletes and teams, including the Olympic Games, Commonwealth Games, international cricket and rugby union. Between 1992 and 1997, he was employed as Marketing Manager for ABC Tasmania. There he organised a number of Statewide music and cultural projects, including TasTalent, promoting Tasmanian songwriters and musicians, and also served as Chair of Island magazine. Since 1996, he has been with ABC Radio National including The Sports Factor presenter and RN Breakfast sports editor and presenter.

Hadfield was Geelong Football Club communications manager for three years. He has volunteered his expertise to many Geelong organisations, including the Smart Geelong Network and the Newtown and Chilwell Cricket Club where is a Life Member, as well as founding the Friends of Barwon Side Quarry, a community group responsible for planting thousands of trees and shrubs on a reclaimed tip.

Hadfield says that "mentorship from cricket commentary doyen Richie Benaud and learning respect from legendary AFL coach Kevin Sheedy" inspire his sport journalism career. The 500 Club, co-written by Hadfield and Sheedy, is regarded as one of the best books about not just Australian football, but Australian sport.

Hadfield has written two plays, The Mysterious Case of the Blood Red Rose and An Itch Too Sensitive To Scratch which have staged by theatre groups in Sydney, Hobart and Geelong. He founded the musical group Dancing with Socrates and it has released three EPs. In 2022, the song The Old River Knows written by Hadfield and recorded by Lindsay Field, Sam See and Glyn Mason was released.

Hadfield's monograph Never Short of a Word contains a collection of his writings including short stories and poems.

In 2019, Hadfield was awarded OAM for service to broadcast media as a journalist and to the arts, music and the community. Hadfield recently became aware five of his ancestors were aboard ships in The First Fleet; an able seaman, a Royal Marine, and three convicts.

== Books ==
- Cricket rebels by Chris Harte and Warwick Hadfield, Sydney, QB Books, 1985.
- Sporting diets by Warwick Hadfield. Sydney, Lilyfield Publishers, 1987.
- Never short of a word by Warwick Hadfield. Self published, 2012.
- Sheeds: follow your dreams by Kevin Sheedy with Warwick Hadfield, Melbourne, Crown Content, 2001.
- The 500 club: footy's greatest coaches by Kevin Sheedy with Warwick Hadfield. Melbourne, News Custom Publishing, 2004.
- The long march: reflections from a lifetime in football by Kevin Sheedy with Warwick Hadfield. Melbourne, Slattery, 2013.
