= Tony Barrell =

Tony Barrell or Anthony Barrell may refer to:

- Tony Barrell (journalist), British journalist active since 1993
- Tony Barrell (broadcaster) (1940–2011), English author and broadcaster who lived in Australia
