= Radio National Breakfast =

Australian radio program

- Genre: News: analysis, commentary, features, interviews, specials
- Running time: 105 min. weekdays; including breaks
- Country of origin: Australia
- Home station: ABC Radio National
- Hosted by: Sally Sara
- Original release: present incarnation began in 1999 – present
- Website: www.abc.net.au/radionational/programs/breakfast/
- Podcast: www.abc.net.au/radionational/feed/2890356/podcast.xml

Radio National Breakfast and sometimes shortened to Breakfast, is a national early morning news program in Australia, broadcast since 2005. The program is broadcast live in the eastern states, and on delay in other states, on the Australian Broadcasting Corporation's Radio National network. It can also be listened to online.

First hosted by Peter Thompson from 1994 to 2004, the program was subsequently hosted by Fran Kelly from 2005 to 2021. Patricia Karvelas from 2021 to 2024. Since mid-December Sally Sara has been hosting the program.

== History ==
The program was hosted by Peter Thompson from 1994, who took a break from the show between 1999 and 2002 before rejoining for a further two years. At the end of 2004 he left the show again, citing his reason for resignation as being simply too much work for one person. Fran Kelly took over as host in March 2005; she announced her retirement from the position on 21 October 2021, saying that after 17 years, she needed to reclaim her sleep.

In December 2021, Patricia Karvelas was announced as Kelly's replacement. The program is broadcast in two segments (6.00 to 7.00 and 7.30 to 9.00) before and after the current affairs program AM at 7.00. Sally Sara or Steve Cannane host the show on Monday and Patricia Karvelas from Tuesday to Friday due to Karvelas hosting Q+A.

In November 2024, ABC announced that Patricia Karvelas will be stepping down as host in December and will replaced by Sally Sara from January 2025. Karvelas will take on an expanded role across ABC platforms.

A weekend edition, called Saturday Extra, is hosted by journalist Geraldine Doogue and is broadcast from 7.30 am to 9.00 am AEST.

The program begins officially at 6.05 am following the hourly news broadcast. The news broadcasts are state-based and occur on the hour, every hour, with the traditional "Majestic Fanfare" tune.

About four items are presented each hour, with longer items earlier in the program. These include a mix of reports from ABC correspondents, reports from the BBC and CNN, as well as interviews with a variety of people, including federal and state politicians, prominent commentators, persons of interest, celebrities and ordinary people who are in the middle of news stories.

At 7.10 am, after the 7.00 news, Breakfast switches over to AM, which runs from 7.10 am until 7.30 am, after which Breakfast returns.

== Hosts ==
Hosts of the show include:

- Peter Thompson, January 1994 – December 1999, January 2003 – December 2004
- Vivian Schenker, January 2000 – December 2002
- Fran Kelly, March 2005 – December 2021
- Patricia Karvelas, January 2022 – December 2024
- Sally Sara, January 2025 – present
- Geraldine Doogue, weekend host and fill-in host
- Norman Swan, fill-in host

== Contributors ==
There are several regular contributors to the program:

- Luke Siddham Dundon - Newsreader
- Melissa Clarke - Political correspondent
- Peter Ryan - Business correspondent

== Recognition and acclaim ==
Radio National Breakfast, while lower in ratings than most other state and local radio programs, has, as a national program, one of the highest listener numbers for any early morning program in Australia. In particular it is regarded as the program which federal Australian politicians listen to, particularly given its focus on national politics. Former Australian Prime Minister, John Howard, was known to be a fan of the program and regularly appeared for interviews.

== See also ==
- Today (Radio National Breakfast's British equivalent)
- Morning Ireland (Radio National Breakfast's Irish equivalent)
- Morning Edition (Radio National Breakfast's American equivalent)
