= Elizabeth Jackson (radio journalist) =

Australian broadcaster

Elizabeth Jackson is an Australian Broadcasting Corporation journalist who produces and presents the Saturday AM programme on ABC Local Radio, and Correspondents Report, which airs on Sundays on ABC Radio National. She has previously worked on Sydney radio station 2GB, and for ABC Television's 7:30 Report and Lateline programmes.

Jackson has had a long career with the ABC ranging across television news and current affairs to radio and online. She lived in Canberra for several years where she presented the breakfast show on ABC Radio 666. She is now a senior member of the News Division.

In 2008, Jackson won the Donald McDonald Reuters Scholarship to Oxford University. She studied Freedom of Information law at Oxford.

Jackson lives with her husband and three sons. She is based in Sydney.
