= Christopher Lawrence =

Christopher or Chris Lawrence may refer to:

- Chris Lawrence (racing driver) (1933–2011), British racing driver
- Chris Lawrence (rugby league) (born 1988), Australian professional rugby league player
- Chris Lawrence (visual effects) (active since 2002)
- Christopher Lawrence (broadcaster) (born 1957), Australian classical music broadcaster
- Christopher Lawrence (DJ) (active since 1997), American disc jockey and music producer
- Christopher Lawrence (windsurfer) (born 1968), Australian windsurfer

== See also ==
- Chris Laurence (born 1949), English jazz double bassist
- Mark Christopher Lawrence (born 1964), American character actor
- Bong Go (Christopher Lawrence Go, born 1974), Filipino politician
- Christopher St Lawrence (disambiguation)
