= Cassie McCullagh =

Australian radio presenter

- Occupation: radio broadcaster
- Years active: 2007 to present
- Known for: hosting ABC Radio programs
- Notable work: Sydney Mornings, The Bookshelf, Life Matters, The TV Club

Cassie McCullagh is an Australian radio and television broadcaster, journalist, columnist, and writer. In recent years she has become well known for her work at the Australian Broadcasting Corporation (ABC), particularly as a radio and podcast presenter.

After having worked for the Illawarra Mercury, McCullagh joined the ABC in 2007 and has since hosted numerous programs across the ABC Local Radio, ABC Radio National and ABC Classic networks. She also taught some journalism subjects at the University of Wollongong in 2004 and 2005.

In 2016, McCullagh hosted the Thursday and Friday editions of Life Matters on Radio National, where she also hosted The TV Club. McCullagh then hosted Arts Weekly on Radio National in 2017. She also filled in for Philip Clark and Sarah McDonald on the national ABC Local Radio program Nightlife.

In 2018, McCullagh commenced hosting a new morning program called Focus on ABC Radio Sydney between 10 am and 11 am each day. The same year, she also started co-hosting a weekly program on Radio National called The Bookshelf. In 2019, The Australian apologised after columnist Chris Kenny accused McCullagh and her The Bookshelf co-host Kate Evans of joking about killing conservatives, when they were actually discussing art conservators.

As part of a line-up change on ABC Radio Sydney in 2022, McCullagh's program was extended by an hour after it was given an earlier start time of 9 am. It also reverted to being called Mornings.

In 2021, McCullagh received praise from industry website radioinfo for her "talk radio craft skills" after she explored the legalities and environmental impacts of idling vehicles which prompted much discussion and public debate about idle reduction.

McCullagh has also been a commentator on ABC TV's The Mix and co-hosted an arts and culture program called Event with Deborah Hutton on Foxtel Arts.

McCullagh's husband, Stephen Fitzpatrick, is a former indigenous affairs editor at The Australian. McCullagh appeared on a 2019 episode of Insight on SBS where she discussed recommencing a relationship with Fitzpatrick after she had previously ended the eight-year relationship. On the program, she revealed they had two children by the time they were 25, after which they were acrimoniously separated for eleven years before reuniting.
