= AM (radio program) =

Australian current affairs radio program

- Genre: News and current affairs
- Country of origin: Australia
- Language: English
- Home station: Radio National; ABC Local Radio
- Hosted by: Isabella Higgins
- Original release: 1967
- Website: abc.net.au/am/
- Podcast: abc.net.au/am/rss/amrss.xml

AM is an Australian radio program.

It is the Australian Broadcasting Corporation's flagship current affairs radio program, aired each morning on both the ABC Radio National and ABC Local Radio networks.

First broadcast on 4 September 1967, AM is one of Australia's longest-running radio programs.

== History ==
=== 20th century ===
Robert Peach was the first host of AM when it first aired on the morning of 4 September 1967 on the ABC Radio 1 (metro) and ABC Radio 3 (regional) networks (now ABC Local Radio). The show aired on stations such as 2FC in Sydney, 2NA in Newcastle, 2CN in Canberra and 3AR in Melbourne.

In advertisements published in newspapers prior to the first edition of AM being broadcast, the program was described as: "lively, topical half-hour of reports from home and overseas" with a promise the show would "talk about the kind of things that you talk about - at home, at work, on the train..."

Introducing the first edition of AM, Peach said: "Good morning, I'm Robert Peach and every weekday morning from now on we'll be taking a fresh look at the world, what it's talking about, what people in the news are doing..."

Aired every morning at 8:00am immediately after the 7:45am news bulletin, AM soon became Australia's most popular morning radio current affairs program.

Two years later, ABC Radio's evening current affairs program, PM was created as a companion program, which became the ABC's flagship evening current affairs program.

AM had its critics in the early years. In January 1968, AM was described by a journalist Harry Robinson in The Sydney Morning Herald as a flop. He said that this was due to "lifeless stories" and "dim presentation". The following month, Robinson described AM as "patchy" and "less than magnetic", stating: "some mornings the voice reports from overseas are lively and illuminating. On others they are like yesterday's loaf: dry. Australian stories are, with only few exceptions, banal and predictable." Robinson also opined that Wright deserved better material to deliver and that listeners deserved better stories to hear.

Former ATN-7 newsreader Brian Wright took over as the host of AM in 1968 while Peach stayed on as a producer. Robinson said it was doubtful that Wright's presence would be enough to "lift" AM.

Wright was succeeded in 1969 by Tony Lee - an Englishman who had served with the Britain's Fleet Air Arm during the Second World War before joining the ABC in Papua New Guinea while working for an oil exploration company. Lee hosted the show for six months before Robert Peach returned to the role in July 1969.

However, Lee had to temporarily return to hosting duties when Peach sustained serious injuries when he and his wife were hit by a car while walking in Sydney. Peach suffered facial lacerations, broken ribs and two broken legs in the accident. Glenn Menzies then filled in for Peach as he recovered from his injuries. Peach returned to AM on 18 May 1970 while still undergoing physiotherapy.

In 1974, Peach was succeeded by Bill Dowsett, who had been hosting PM. On 31 December 1972, Peach and Dowsett had hosted a one-off retrospective special titled At Last - The AM/PM Show.

With the introduction of a public affairs program was launched on ABC Radio 1 in 1976 called City Extra, Dowsett was appointed as the inaugural host of that show, forcing him to stand down as the host of AM. Hamish Robertson, who had already been filling in for Dowsett on AM was appointed to the role of AM host permanently.

When Robertson left the ABC the following year to join the BBC World Service, AM reporter Kel Richards was promoted to the hosting role.

After hosting AM for two years, Richards was replaced by Steve Cosser and demoted back to being a reporter which prompted a protest by the Australian Journalists Association and caused friction between Richards and the ABC. However, Richards was placated with a new role as an associate producer of ABC TV's new current affairs program Six O'Clock Statewide.

Replacing Steve Cossar in 1982 was Red Harrison who commenced his tenure as AM host. Harrison had a deep baritone voice which had been described by some colleagues as "whisky soaked" and a unique stern presentation style. Harrison was described as sounding like "a British Army officer who never heard the 1918 Armistice bugle".

In 1987, John Highfield was appointed as the host of the program.

AM was later introduced to ABC Radio 2 (now Radio National) with a new early edition at 7:05am after the 7:00am news bulletin but in 1994, concerns were raised by staff at 2BL in Sydney about the possible issues arising out of having two near-identical editions of the same program competing against each other in two different timeslots on the two stations.

In 1987, the program celebrated its 20th anniversary. Past presenters Robert Peach, Red Harrison, Steve Cosser and Hamish Robertson as well as former reporter Bob Carr and host of PM Paul Murphy, gathered at the ABC studios in Sydney to record a commemorative anniversary program which went to air at 10am during Margaret Throsby's Mornings program on 2BL on 4 September 1987. Former reporters Richard Carleton, Ray Martin and Allan Hogan also contributed to the program via telephone.

Ellen Fanning became the first female host of AM in 1994, two and a half years after she became the first female host of its evening counterpart PM. Fanning continued in the role until the end of 1996 when she decided to concentrate on television journalism.

Fanning's successor was foreign correspondent Peter Cave, who took over in 1997. When the program celebrated its 30th anniversary in 1997, Cave presented a special edition of AM which explored the future of broadcast journalism in Australia. Among the program's high-profile guests were ABC managing director Brian Johns and original reporter Ray Martin.

=== 21st century ===
Cave hosted the show for four and a half years until mid-2001 when he was appointed as the ABC's new foreign affairs editor. He was succeeded on AM by Linda Mottram who became the show's second female host.

After Mottram had hosted the show for two years, she stepped down from the role in 2003 and was replaced by Tony Eastley who had been presenting the New South Wales edition of ABC News on ABC TV.

In 2007, the program celebrated its 40th anniversary when former presenters recalled various memories of working on the program. Peter Cave revealed he had once passed out after running three times from the ABC's Sydney offices in William Street to the AM studios in Forbes Street to deliver scripts to host Bill Dowsett while the program was going live to air. He recalled: "One day all the other reporters claimed to have asthma and I was the only one who could run. I ran two stories up the hill. When I ran the third story up, it was getting close to the end of the program and I was totally out of breath. I ran into the studio to give Bill Dowsett the script. He began reading it almost immediately and I held my breath so the audience wouldn't hear me panting. I went back through the studio door and passed out cold."

After a decade of hosting AM and easily becoming the longest serving host of the program, Tony Eastley stood down from the role in 2014.

At the start of 2014, it was announced that Virginia Trioli from ABC TV's News Breakfast would succeed Eastley the new host of AM. However, in a surprising turnaround less than a week later, Trioli decided against hosting the AM and returned to her television role, co-hosting News Breakfast with Michael Rowland. Former 7.30 senior political editor Chris Uhlmann was appointed as the host of AM instead. Uhlmann only hosted the show for one year before leaving to become the ABC's political editor.

In 2017, AM celebrated the 50th anniversary of its first program. Early that year, it was announced Sabra Lane would be the host of AM replacing Brissenden who moved to ABC TV's Four Corners. It was also announced that as part of the program's 50th anniversary, new theme music would be introduced for the show to have "a fresh, contemporary sound."

In late 2020, it was announced that AM would be presented from the studios of ABC Radio Hobart from early 2021 due to host Sabra Lane relocating to Tasmania.

In December 2025, Lane announced her retirement as host of the program.

In January 2026, it was announced that former ABC News correspondent for the program Isabella Higgins would take over as host from Lane.

== Controversies ==
=== Accusations of managerial interference (1987) ===
In March 1987, the ABC faced accusations of having senior management interfere with the editorial decision making of AM when a planned live interview on AM with John Pilger was cancelled. This occurred during the fallout from Pilger's controversial interview with prime minister Bob Hawke which had aired on ABC TV's The 7.30 Report.

The heavily edited pre-recorded interview promptly drew criticism for its apparent bias, with Hawke's press secretary Barrie Cassidy and former New South Wales premier Neville Wran among those to complain.

ABC chairman David Hill described the Pilger interview as not measuring up the ABC's standards of professionalism which prompted Pilger in turn to claim Hill had intervened in editorial decisions under the guise of protecting journalistic standards.

Pilger offered to be interviewed live on AM about the matter but the decision was made to not proceed, amid warnings from ABC management that statements made by Pilger about Hill had potentially been defamatory. The program's host John Highfield said that the decision had been made to cancel the interview after a "timely warning" from management and a legal officer about the potential risk of covering the Pilger story.

However, in a letter published in The Sydney Morning Herald, acting executive producer of AM Peter Cave said that he took responsibility for rejecting the offer of a live interview with Pilger on AM. He denied that he had been advised by ABC management to dump the interview. Cave said that although he had received advice that one section of a statement issued by Pilger was potentially defamatory, it would not have necessarily precluded Pilger from being interviewed on AM. Cave said that the reason he had rejected the interview with Pilger was simply because there were better stories available for the program.

=== Accusations of bias and anti-Americanism (2003) ===
In 2003, AM was criticised by the Howard government for its coverage of the Iraq war, particularly the 2003 invasion of Iraq, accusing the program's coverage of being biased and anti-American.

In May 2003, Senator Richard Alston requested an urgent investigation into AM's coverage. An internal complaints review rejects 66 allegations of bias but upholds two complaints.

In October 2003, an independent review overruled the ABC's original investigation and upholds 17 of the original complaints.

In January 2004, Alston lodged a complaint about AM to the Australian Broadcasting Authority, claiming the program had breached the ABC's codes of practice 43 times.

Finally in 2005, after a 13-month investigation, the ABA found the ABC had on four occasions failed to make reasonable efforts to ensure AM was balanced and impartial while covering the Iraq war. Although the ABA upheld six of Alston's allegations, three related to the same AM segment so therefore amounted to four breaches.

Although the ABA praised AM for its coverage of the Iraq war, describing it as "of a high standard overall", the report stated that "the frequency such matters compromised the quality of AM's valuable and extensive coverage of the Iraq war".

Managing director Russell Balding accepted the findings but maintained that the coverage of the war on AM was "professional, comprehensive and balanced".

The ABA's draft findings were criticised by Media Watch host David Marr in 2004.

Alston's persistent campaign and his determination to have his complaints about AM resolved in his favour was criticised by political reporter Michelle Grattan.

=== The Latham handshake (2004) ===
One of the most memorable events of the 2004 Australian federal election campaign occurred in the doorway of the AM studio at the ABC's Sydney headquarters.

Both prime minister John Howard and opposition leader Mark Latham were interviewed on AM.

At the conclusion of his live interview on AM, Lathan exited the studio door as Howard was approaching. Upon seeing Howard, Latham lunged forward and in an apparent show of aggression placed his face in close proximity to Howard's while pulling Howard's arm while vigorously shaking it. The incident was recounted in 2007 by the ABC's former national radio current affairs editor Gordon Lavery who described it as "one of the most remarkable pieces of political theatre I think a lot of us have ever seen". A still photograph of the handshake hung on the AM studio door until it was taken down during renovations in 2017.

Latham later claimed his aggressive handshake was a form of payback alleging Howard had previously "crushed" his wife. Howard, however, claimed Latham simply wanted to create the impression of dominance.

=== 2023 Alice Springs coverage ===
On 31 January 2023, a report filed by Indigenous affairs correspondent Carly Williams was broadcast on AM about an Alice Springs town meeting which had been held to discuss the ongoing crime in the town.

The ABC received a number of complaints about the report, concerned that the coverage had unduly favoured only one perspective at the meeting, taking particular umbrage at the suggestions that there had been elements of white supremacy, and failing to fully cover the differing views which had been expressed at the meeting. The Ombudsman's Office upheld 19 complaints, finding the AM report had breached impartiality standards. The ABC re-edited the story, attached an editor's note and acknowledged the error on the "Corrections and Clarifications" webpage.

ABC managing director David Anderson admitted that there had been a failure in the ABC's processes during the production of Williams' report. Anderson told a Senate Estimates hearing that the report did not contain the necessary perspectives for a balanced report which had prompted him to ask ABC news director Justin Stevens to investigate how it had occurred.

Alice Springs mayor Matt Paterson criticised the AM report and also accused the organisation of attempting to start a race war, stating: "It's adding unnecessary anxiety when we are all trying to come together to address the issue and here you've got the ABC lighting the fuse to have a race war. For the ABC to have their Indigenous Affairs correspondent report like that is astounding – they could have brought so much positive drive and support for the Aboriginal culture here in town, but they're obviously not concerned with that, they're more interested in making it look like a problem when it's not." Paterson also claimed that he called an end to the meeting when a small minority of attendees resorted to racist language and name calling.

The reporting was also criticised by federal opposition leader Peter Dutton who requested ABC chairperson Ita Buttrose intervene. 2GB presenter Ben Fordham described the story as having been filled with fake news, taking particular issue with the fact that Williams had not actually attended the meeting and had only interviewed a select few people outside.

The AM report also prompted local businessman and meeting convener Garth Thompson to lodge a legal complaint against the ABC. He claimed to have had his reputation damaged by the suggestion that he had condoned white supremacy, and also claimed to have received abuse from those who had believed what was reported in the AM story. Thompson stated: "We were hung out to dry because of the way they portrayed us. I want the stories removed and I want a full nationwide apology to our town. I've been criticised Australia-wide and I've copped abuse and all sorts of crap... All they (the ABC) did was hang off the attitude of a couple of hippy mung beans that walked in there (to the meeting) with that same attitude."

== Current broadcast times ==
An early edition of the program called Early AM is broadcast as a ten-minute program at 6:05am across the ABC Local Radio network.

After a ten-minute ABC News bulletin at 7:00am, AM on Radio National is presented as a 20-minute program which commences at 7:10am.

A full 25 minute edition of AM is aired on the ABC Local Radio network, commencing at 8:05am. Until 2020, it had previously commenced at 8:00am immediately following the iconic 15-minute edition of ABC News at 7:45am. However, after the axing of the 7:45 bulletin, a new five-minute news bulletin was introduced at the top of the hour, reducing AM to 25 minutes in duration.

A separate edition of AM is presented for ABC Radio Perth and regional Western Australian ABC stations at 10:00am EST due to the time difference between the eastern states and WA.

AM is also broadcast on Saturday mornings on Radio National, 7.10 am, as This Week. Like its weekday counterpart, This Week is also presented at 8:05am on ABC Local Radio.

AM is not broadcast on Sundays.

== Presenters and reporters ==
As of 2026, the program has had 17 presenters, with Tony Eastley being the longest serving having hosted the show for a decade between 2004 and 2014.

Throughout its 56-year history, there have been three four hosts of AM, including Ellen Fanning, Linda Mottram, Sabra Lane and current host Isabella Higgins.

Reporters who have worked on the program throughout its history have included Ray Martin, Richard Carleton, Jeff McMullen, Charles Wooley, Bob Carr and Clare Martin.

Presenter	Years
Robert Peach	1967–1974
Brian Wright	1968
Tony Lee	1969
Bill Dowsett	1973–1975
Hamish Robertson	1976
Kel Richards	1977–1978
Steve Cosser	1979–1980
Red Harrison	1981–1986
John Highfield	1986–1987
Peter Thompson	1988–1993
Ellen Fanning	1994–1996
Peter Cave	1997–2001
Linda Mottram	2001–2003
Tony Eastley	2004–2014
Chris Uhlmann	2014–2015
Michael Brissenden	2015–2016
Sabra Lane	2017–2025
Isabella Higgins	2026–present

== This Week ==
In August 2021, the long‑running ABC Radio program Saturday AM was renamed This Week. The program continued to air nationally on Saturday mornings as part of the ABC Local Radio weekend schedule. By late 2024 or early 2025, This Week was no longer listed in ABC Local Radio program guides, indicating that it had been removed from the regular broadcast lineup. ABC has not issued a formal announcement regarding the program’s discontinuation.

Presenter	Years
Elizabeth Jackson	2004–2018
Linda Mottram	2019 – August 2021
Thomas Oriti	2018
David Lipson	2023

== Theme music ==
The original 1967 signature was "Crossbeat", a 30-second electronic music piece sourced from the BBC, composed and realised by David Cain of the BBC Radiophonic Workshop.

The theme for AM which was used throughout much of the program's history until 2017 was one of the most recognisable themes in Australia and was composed by Tony Ansell and Peter Wall.

In 2017, a new theme for AM was introduced to commemorate the program's 50th year.
