= All in the Mind =

All in the Mind may refer to:

== Music ==
- All in the Mind (album), an album by The Bucketheads
- "All in the Mind" (song), a 1992 song by the rock band The Verve
- "(Probably) All in the Mind", a song by British rock band Oasis from their album Heathen Chemistry

== Other uses ==
- All in the Mind (novel), a 2008 novel by Alastair Campbell
- All in the Mind (Australian Broadcasting Corporation radio), Australian radio programme
- All in the Mind (BBC radio), radio series on BBC about psychology and psychiatry
