= The Night Air (radio program) =

Australian radio program, 2002–2013

- Genre: Collage, Arts and music
- Running time: 85 min. weekly
- Country of origin: Australia
- Home station: ABC Radio National
- Hosted by: Brent Clough
- Produced by: Brent Clough; Diane Dean; John Jacobs
- Original release: 2002 – 27 January 2013
- Website: abc.net.au/rn/nightair
- Podcast: The Night Air podcast

The Night Air was a weekly ABC Radio National program that remixed a variety of media around different themes. The show was broadcast nationally across Australia from 2002 to 2013 and is partly available as a podcast.

The program described itself as "radio abstraction for listening pleasure", and was labelled by others as "audio collage", "hybrid radio", and an "aural equivalent of the avant-garde cut-up".

The themes changed with each episode, and these were the driving force for the content of the show.

== History and format ==
The Night Air began production in 2002. It was conceived by Tony Barrell, Diane Dean, Brent Clough and John Jacobs. It was a remix program that focused on recontextualising other audio material, including radio drama and documentary, news, interviews, talkback, short stories, poetry, music and film. Most of the programs were locally produced for the series, with content sourced both from the Radio National archives and external sources, although some episodes were programs sourced from overseas producers, such as a short series of programs from the like-minded American radio program Radiolab.

The format built on those established in previous montage and cut-up programs that Barrell had worked on at Triple J in the 1970s and 1980s, such as Sunday Afternoon at the Movies and Watching the Radio with the TV Off. Clough said the program made “music out of talk”, while Jacobs described the process as one of “distillation and subtractive synthesis”.

Forming part of Radio National's arts and music programming, The Night Air was a pre-recorded show divided into two parts. Both parts were broadcast and streamed on Sundays from 8.30 pm to 10.00 pm AEST. Part 1 is then repeated at 9.30 pm Friday, and Part 2 at 12.00 am Sunday. The show began partial podcasting in 2005 when the station first commenced the practice, with Part 1 available for four weeks after the initial airing time.

=== Cancellation ===
In late 2012, Radio National manager Michael Mason announced that several long-running arts programs would be cancelled, and that some staff would be laid off. The official reason given was the combination of budget restrictions and dwindling audiences for these kinds of programs, which Mason said were expensive to produce, with the ABC seeking to save $1 million by axing the programs. The series decommissioned at the end of 2012 included The Night Air, the radio drama series Airplay, the book-reading programs The Book Reading and Sunday Story, the arts magazine program Creative Instinct, the language program Lingua Franca and the film review program MovieTime, (which concluded shortly after the retirement of its long-serving presenter Julie Rigg in late 2012).

The Night Air ceased production in November 2012. A short season of "best of" programs was broadcast during December 2012-January 2013. The final episode of the series aired on Sunday 27 January 2013. Brent Clough left the ABC in late April 2013, after 25 years with the national broadcaster.

The Night Air is now an archived program that is no longer broadcast. Podcast episodes of the series remain available for download from the Night Air page on the Radio National website.

== Specialised programming ==
The Night Air engages in co-productions and specialised programming on a semi-regular basis.

=== Orpheus Project and Remix Awards ===
To mark the 400th anniversary of Monteverdi's L'Orfeo, The Night Air broadcast The Orpheus Project: 400 Years to 4 Minutes, a series of “micro operas” by contemporary Australian composers and sound artists. Produced in collaboration with ABC Classic FM and Triple J, the project commissioned 4-minute Orpheus remixes by Constantine Koukias, Gail Priest, Damian Barbeler, Robin Fox and Anthony Pateras, Amanda Stewart, and Dave Noyze and Sarah Last, and went to air on 2 December 2007. The Remix Awards then invited listeners to produce their own 4-minute remixes of Orpheus, a selection of which were broadcast on 24 February 2008.

=== Electrofringe and This Is Not Art ===
From 2004 to 2008, The Night Air collaborated with Electrofringe, an electronic arts festival in Newcastle, Australia, and its umbrella festival, This Is Not Art. The collaborations showcased and remixed content from the festivals, in some instances broadcast live from the festival.

=== Pool ===
Through the media-sharing site Pool, The Night Air has curated a number of programs from public callouts for content, such as the City Nights project. It has also sourced a variety of discrete content through this site for various episodes.

=== Scope ===
In December 2008 and January 2009, The Night Air ran a series of features under the title Reviewing Scope. These specials revisited Scope, an ABC Radio satire and social commentary program that ran from 1958 to 1976. The “lost episodes” were selected by one of the show's original presenters, Barry Mortlock Anthony.

== Hosts and contributors ==
Tony Barrell ceased work on the show when he retired from full-time employment with the ABC in 2008. The three remaining producers of the program, Brent Clough, Diane Dean and John Jacobs continued to work on the series until its cancellation. Despite his retirement, Barrell's influence remained strong, and his work continued to feature in various forms. A six-part remixed version of his Triple J series "Watching the Radio with the TV Off" (hosted by ABC veteran Barry Anthony) was broadcast in 2010, and special tribute programs in Barrell's memory were broadcast after his sudden death from a heart attack in March 2011.

Production responsibilities for the program were rotated, each episode being typically produced by one person, but often with a number of contributors – guest producers, freelancers and interns.

Clough was the regular presenter, though other producers also hosted the show from time to time.
