= Christopher Lawrence (broadcaster) =

Australian musician, author, and conductor

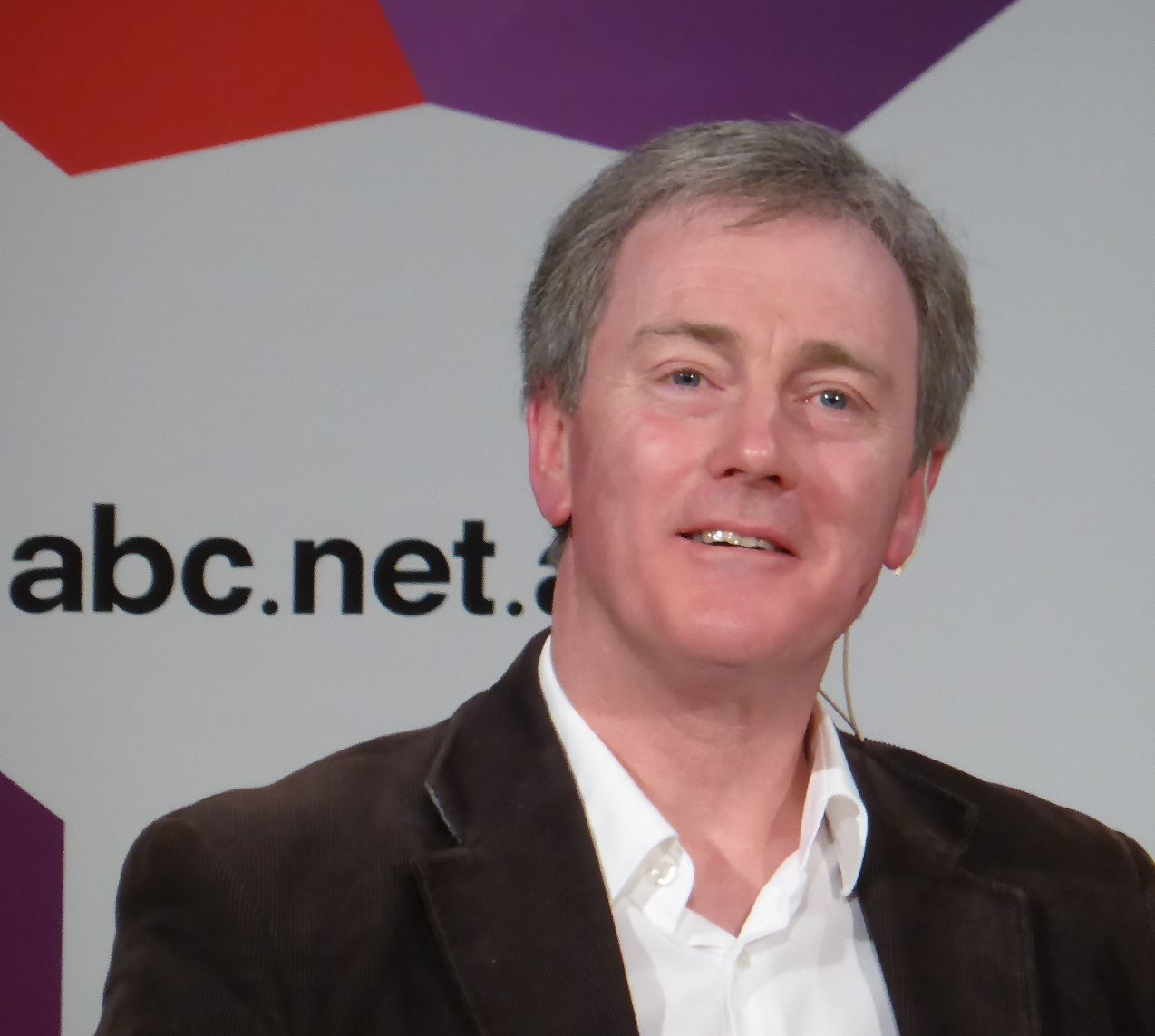
- Lawrence, 2014
- Born: 24 December 1956 (age 69)
- Occupations: Broadcaster, musician, teacher
- Known for: ABC Classic FM broadcaster

Christopher Lawrence (born 24 December 1956) is a classical musician, author, and conductor. He is most notable for his work as a broadcaster on Australian Broadcasting Corporation radio station ABC Classic FM, and previously on ABC Radio National and ABC Local Radio.

== Early life ==
Lawrence's parents were both nightclub and television entertainers, his father a singer and pianist, his mother a singer and dancer. He has two younger brothers. From age 11 he had attended the Sydney Conservatorium of Music High School, studying piano and cello, but at age 15 had to terminate his studies and get a job when his parents divorced and his mother became a single mother of three sons. He was first employed as a mail boy at the ABC, later moving to the record library.

== Career ==
Lawrence was the first presenter of Radio National's The Music Show on Saturday mornings which started in 1991 as In Tempo 91. He also presented ABC Classic FM's Breakfast and Drive programs between 1994 and 2001. He then left Classic FM but returned in 2010 to present its Afternoons program; in 2012 he became the presenter for Mornings, taking over from Margaret Throsby's tenure in that role. In 2016, he began presenting Drive, and moved to Weekend Breakfast in 2018. He also presented Evenings and Breakfast on 702 ABC Sydney, Afternoons on 936 ABC Hobart, and the series Bakelite Express on networked local radio across the country.

In October 2018, Lawrence announced his intention to retire in January 2019.

=== Awards ===
- 1989 International Emmy Award for Arts Programming – soundtrack production for the ABC TV recording of The Australian Opera's La bohème stage production.
- Three ARIA Music Awards (Australian Record Industry Association)
- Churchill Fellowship
- Editors' Choice Award at the 1992 Cannes Classical Awards in France.
- In 1999 Lawrence was awarded an honorary doctorate in communications by Central Queensland University for his career in broadcasting.

== Personal life ==
He is the partner of violinist Julia Fredersdorff, Artistic Director of the Peninsula Summer Music Festival. The couple have two daughters.

== Bibliography ==
- Lawrence, Christopher (2001). Swooning. Milsons Point, New South Wales: Random House Australia. ISBN 1-74051-059-3.
- —— (2002). Hymns of the Forefathers. Milsons Point, New South Wales: Random House Australia. ISBN 1-74051-453-X.
- —— (2004). Swing Symphony : Another Midlife Adventure in the South of France. Milsons Point, New South Wales: Random House Australia. ISBN 1-74051-210-3.
- —— (2018). Symphony of Seduction: The Great Love Stories of Classical Composers. Melbourne: Nero (Schwartz). ISBN 9781863958400.
