= Life Matters =

Australian radio program

- Country of origin: Australia
- Language: English
- Home station: Radio National, Australian Broadcasting Corporation
- Hosted by: Tegan Taylor and Beverley Wang
- Original release: 1992
- Website: www.abc.net.au/listen/programs/lifematters

Life Matters is a magazine-style radio program that has been broadcast on Radio National by the Australian Broadcasting Corporation since 1992. The first presenter was Geraldine Doogue, and as of 20 January 2025 the program is presented Monday to Thursday by Tegan Taylor (replacing Hilary Harper) and by Beverley Wang on Fridays. Covering a range of social and personal issues, it airs each weekday at 9 a.m., and is repeated at 7 p.m.

== History ==
Life Matters was devised in 1992 as "a program charting social change" by a trio consisting of Doogue (already an established and acclaimed broadcaster), Norman Swan (general manager of Radio National at the time), and producer Joanne Upham. Doogue had been recruited to Radio National in 1991 to present Offspring, a predecessor program to Life Matters, after losing her passion for hard news following her high-profile recruitment by the ABC to work in news and current affairs including the launch of The National, the networks' contentious and unsuccessful remoulding of their evening television news and current affairs hour

== Presenters ==
- Geraldine Doogue presented the program for eleven years from its inception.
- Julie McCrossin presented the program from 2002 to 2005.
- Richard Aedy presented the program from 2006 to 2011.
- Natasha Mitchell presented the program from 2012 to 2016.
- Amanda Smith presented the program from 2017 to 2018.
- Hilary Harper and Michael Mackenzie presented the program from 2019 until Mackenzie's retirement in May 2022.
- As of February 2024, Life Matters is presented by Hilary Harper from Monday to Thursday and Beverley Wang on Fridays.
- As of 20 January 2025 Tegan Taylor replaces Hillary Harper in presenting the show Monday to Thursday, with Beverley Wang continuing in the Friday broadcast role.

== Format and description ==
Life Matters covers a range of topics relating to personal relationships, health, financial and work issues, "and the world". It interviews experts and invites listeners to contribute by phoning in and sending text messages. Throughout its history, the show has also had a rolling offering of special regular segments & feature series, with recent notable examples including Dated: Love Online After 50, Hillary Harper's very personal five-part investigation of later-life searching for romance and relationship in the online era of dating apps (following the breakdown of her 20-year marriage), as well as Ask Aunty, the programme's final Friday segment which takes a lighthearted examination of sometimes quirky, sometimes awkward social and personal dilemmas and presents one such case to invited guests (usually a duo) to examine and advise on, with the guests being a mix of comics, humourists, writers and relationship experts.

From its inception the program has been broadcast on weekdays from 9 am. As of February 2024, it is repeated at 7pm, and past episodes are also available on the ABC Listen app.
