= Karvelas =

- Title card of Karvelas
- Genre: Current affairs, commentary
- Presented by: Patricia Karvelas
- Country of origin: Australia
- Original language: English
- No. of seasons: 2

Production
- Production locations: Melbourne, Victoria
- Running time: 1 hour (inc. adverts)

Original release
- Network: Sky News Australia
- Release: 7 February 2016 – 10 December 2017

Related
- National Wrap

Karvelas is an Australian television commentary program broadcast weekly on Sky News Australia. The program, airing Sundays at 7pm AEST/AEDT and broadcast from Melbourne, was hosted by Patricia Karvelas. The series premiered on 7 February 2016. First announced in December 2015, the program covers political and national affairs.

The program ended in 2017, with Karvelas defecting to ABC News to host National Wrap on the public broadcaster in 2018.
