= Beverley Wang =

Canadian-Australian broadcaster, radio producer and journalist

- Born: Vancouver, Canada
- Occupations: Broadcaster; Journalist; Radio producer
- Known for: It's Not a Race podcast (2017–2018); Stop Everything! Life Matters
- Career
- Station: Radio National
- Network: Australian Broadcasting Corporation

Beverley Wang is a Canadian Australian broadcaster, radio producer and journalist. As of 2022, she was host of two programs on ABC Radio National and an executive producer. She also created and hosted It's Not a Race, an ABC podcast dealing with issues of race and identity in Australian culture in 2017–2018. As of February 2024 she presents Life Matters on Fridays, and co-hosts the weekly pop culture show Stop Everything!.

== Early life and education ==
Wang was born in Vancouver, Canada, to a Taiwanese Canadian family who had emigrated to the country in the 1970s. The second of four children, she has described herself growing up as "an angry, 90s, grunge teenager, seeing all the injustice in the world."

Though her parents were not wealthy, they sent her to an elite private school where many of the students were from wealthy backgrounds, an experience that honed her consciousness of "differences and divisions" in society.

Wang showed an early aptitude for writing, becoming an editor of her high school newspaper. After graduating from university, she became an English teacher in Japan before being accepted in 2002 into journalism school at New York University.

== Career ==
After graduation, Wang served a number of internships with New York media outlets, most notably with the New York Daily News, which gave her a first taste of the intensity of daily news reporting. Her first journalism job was with The Journal News, a New York regional newspaper, where she worked for less than a year before becoming a reporter for Associated Press.

She has spoken about the challenges of on-the-beat reporting, in particular, of having to interview people at difficult times in their lives, such as after bereavements. The reporter is caught in the situation of, on the one hand, being required to get the interview, while on the other, trying to show empathy and sensitivity to the interviewee, noting that this is not taught in journalism courses. The stress of breaking news reporting was a contributing factor toward her eventually seeking other areas of work in her chosen field.

Wang emigrated to Australia in 2009, where she secured a job with the Australian Broadcasting Corporation as an online news reporter, focusing on the Asia-Pacific region and current affairs.

When the network offered her a role as a stand-in radio producer, Wang readily agreed, though lacking any broadcasting experience. After a two-day training course, she went on to produce live programs for Radio Australia, ABC NewsRadio, and Radio National, before eventually establishing herself as executive producer of the latter's RN Drive program.

Wang has had several roles with Radio National. As of February 2024, she continues to co-host (with Benjamin Law) and produce RN's Stop Everything!, a program focusing on issues raised by pop culture, and is the Friday host of Life Matters, a weekday morning magazine program exploring social issues.

In 2017, Wang started her own podcast for Radio National, called It's Not a Race, which deals with questions of race and identity in Australian culture. The podcast was generally well-received, particularly by Australian people of colour, and stimulated discussions about race in Australia. It ran from 22 May 2017 to 4 May 2018.

== Controversies ==
In 2017, a colleague of Wang at the ABC, Radio 774 morning presenter Red Symons, interviewed Wang about her podcast It's Not a Race. Symons, known for his mock-hostile persona, began by asking her "what's the deal with Asians?... are they all the same?", and questioning whether her real name was "Beverley". When portions of the interview went to air, it drew complaints and was quickly removed from the ABC website. Symons later apologised, saying "I came across as racist and I was wrong in the way I conducted the interview", adding "this is not who I am".

In 2021, Wang wrote an article about Bluey, a popular Australian children's cartoon series in which the characters are dogs. While praising the show as "tender, nuanced and joyful", she continued: "As a parent of colour, I am always conscious of the presence — or absence — of diverse representation in kids' pop culture, what it means for children and the conversations we have around that", noting the absence of diversity in the series. Her comments attracted both support and criticism on social media.
