= Allan Hogan =

Australian journalist

- Born: 1943 (age 82–83)
- Education: UNSW Sydney
- Occupation: Investigative journalist
- Employers: Australian Broadcasting Corporation; Nine Network; SBS; Zapruder's Other Films
- Spouse: Jess Hogan

Allan Hogan (born 1943) is a veteran Australian investigative journalist.

Hogan studied commerce at the University of New South Wales and became interested in journalism when he got involved with the university paper. He started work at the Australian Broadcasting Corporation and was a founding reporter for the ABC Radio program AM, and worked on such programs as This Day Tonight, and Four Corners, as both a reporter and producer, working with other well-known journalists such as George Negus and Ray Martin. During this time, he reported from the Vietnam War and conducted interviews with such infamous characters as Idi Amin. He was the only Australian journalist to interview Amin.

In 1978 Hogan joined the Nine Network as supervising producer of 60 Minutes and in 1980 was the founding executive producer of the now defunct Sunday program. In 2005 he was the executive producer of SBS TV's Insight program. In 2007 he joined Andrew Denton's company Zapruder's Other Films as a script editor to work on Enough Rope with Andrew Denton. Immediately prior to his retirement in 2014, Hogan was the supervising producer on SBS TV's Dateline program.

Hogan is married to Jess, lives in Glebe, New South Wales and is the President of The Glebe Society.
