= Big Ideas (Australia) =

Australian weekly radio program

Big Ideas is an Australian weekly radio program on ABC Radio National which presents lectures or panels on ideas or issues of particular importance. It is also available as a podcast. It has been presented by Natasha Mitchell since 10 April 2023 when she replaced Paul Barclay, who had presented the program since at least January 2002.

Until the end of 2014, ABC TV also broadcast a television edition of Big Ideas, hosted by Waleed Aly.
