= Natasha Mitchell =

Australian science journalist

- Mitchell at the National Climate Emergency Summit 2020
- Occupations: Journalist, radio presenter, podcaster
- Employer: ABC Radio National
- Known for: Hosting Big Ideas, All in the Mind, Science Friction

Natasha Mitchell is an Australian science journalist. She currently hosts the Radio National program Big Ideas, which presents lectures, panels and podcast episodes on ideas or issues and was initially presented by Australian journalist Paul Barclay.

Mitchell was a Knight Science Journalism Fellow in 2005/2006.

Mitchell was vice-president of the World Federation of Science Journalists from 2011 to 2013. She was elected to the Federation's executive board in 2009. She was a founding committee member of the Science Journalists Association of Australia from 2019 to 2021.

Mitchell was founding host and producer of the ABC Radio National podcast Science Friction from 2017 to 2023, and founding host of the ABC Radio show All in the Mind, one of the ABC's first podcasts. She was also host of the ABC radio show Life Matters, a program first broadcast in 1992 and initially presented by Geraldine Doogue.
