= PM (radio program) =

Australian news radio program

- Genre: News and current affairs
- Country of origin: Australia
- Language: English
- Home station: Radio National and ABC Local Radio
- Original release: 7 July 1969
- Opening theme: "Crossbeat" by David Cain
- Website: www.abc.net.au/radio/programs/pm

PM is one of the Australian Broadcasting Corporation's flagship current affairs radio programs. It is also one of Australia's longest-running productions, having been first aired on 7 July 1969. It is the sister program to AM.

As of 2025 it is hosted by Samantha Donovan and broadcast on both Radio National and ABC Local Radio.

== History and timeslots ==
PM was first broadcast in 1969 for what were then ABC Radio 1 and Radio 3 (now ABC Local Radio). Launched on 7 July 1969, two years after its sister program AM, with both names created by ABC general manager Talbot Duckmanton.

It originally aired every weekday at 6:10 pm (after the 6:00 pm news bulletin), becoming a popular afternoon radio current affairs program. PM was later introduced to ABC Radio 2 (now ABC Radio National) with a new early edition at 5:10 pm after the 5:00 pm news. PM was originally 20 minutes long before expansion to 50 minutes in 1987. In 2018 it reduced to a 25 minute format, which matched AM.

== Description ==
PM complements AM and other ABC News and Current Affairs radio programs, namely The World Today and Correspondents Report.

As of 2025 the program is usually presented by Samantha Donovan.

ABC's streaming links and podcasts allow listening to PM after its broadcast time.

== Past presenters ==
PM's first presenters were Lawrence Bryant and John Highfield, who hosted on alternate nights. Other presenters who have hosted the show include Iain Finlay, Paul Murphy (1983 to 1993), Monica Attard, and Ellen Fanning, and reporters Ray Martin, Bob Carr, Kate Baillieu and Maxine McKew.

Mark Colvin hosted the program from 1997 to 2017. In December 2017, Linda Mottram was announced as the new host of PM. Some time after July 2019, Mottram was replaced by David Lipson.

== Musical signature themes ==
The original 1967 signature was "Crossbeat", a 30-second electronic music piece sourced from the BBC, composed and realised by David Cain of the BBC Radiophonic Workshop. This was replaced by new themes for both AM and PM, composed by Tony Ansell in the 1980s, both based on a similar theme and performed in a similar manner on a synthesiser using a brass-type patch. The similarity between the themes represented a significant link between the sister programs. The music was used from the 1980s until January 2017.
