= All in the Mind (Australian Broadcasting Corporation radio) =

Australian radio program

All in the Mind is a weekly Australian Broadcasting Corporation Radio National program which explores the mind, brain and behaviour. As of 2021 it is hosted by journalist and podcaster Sana Qadar.

The radio program has won a number of awards, including the Grand Medal at the 2008 New York Radio Festival for a series of shows entitled The Brain Under Siege and Best Health/Wellbeing Podcast at the 2022 Australian Podcast Awards.

All in the Mind was previously hosted by Australian science journalist Natasha Mitchell (from 2002 to 2012) and journalist and broadcaster Lynne Malcolm (from 2012 to 2021). Malcolm has written a book informed by stories covered on the program.
