= Sally Sara =

Australian journalist and television presenter

- Born: Sally Jane Sara; 1970 or 1971 (age 54–55); South Australia, Australia
- Education: Kadina Memorial High School; University of Adelaide
- Occupations: Journalist, television presenter
- Employer: Australian Broadcasting Corporation

Sally Jane Sara AM (born 1970 or 1971) is an Australian journalist, TV presenter, author, and playwright. She has worked for the Australian Broadcasting Corporation for many years, including stints as foreign correspondent in Africa, South Asia, and Afghanistan.

Sara currently hosts Radio National Breakfast on ABC Radio National.

== Early life and education ==
Sally Jane Sara was born in 1970 or 1971 in South Australia. She grew up in Port Broughton, on the Yorke Peninsula in South Australia. Her grandmother was a singer, and acted in local plays and school productions, and her mother also acted in amateur productions. Her mother would take her to the city (Adelaide) to see plays while her father took her brothers camping. She developed a love of theatre, and wanted to be a playwright when she was young. Aged eight, she was the first girl to play for the Port Broughton Football Club.

She went to school in Kadina.

Sara is a graduate of the University of Adelaide, staying in the residential college of St Mark's in North Adelaide from 1988 until 1990. She did a course in screenwriting as a component of her course.

== Career ==
In the year after graduation, Sara wrote to the producers of the long-running TV series A Country Practice, asking for an opportunity to do some writing for the show, and was able to write a trial script in their Sydney writing room.

Sara's career began with Outback Radio 2WEB in Bourke, New South Wales. In 1992 she joined the Australian Broadcasting Corporation as a rural reporter, with her first posting at Renmark, South Australia. She also worked in Alice Springs, Adelaide, Melbourne, and Canberra.

Sara was the ABC's Africa correspondent from 2000 to 2005, the first woman to hold this post. She has also reported from Jakarta, the Middle East and London during the 2005 London Bombings. In February 2006, Sara became the presenter of the ABC's Landline.

In November 2008, she took up the post as the ABC's South Asia correspondent based in New Delhi, India.

From February to December 2011, Sara was based in Kabul as the ABC's Afghanistan correspondent, which included numerous assignments in the field reporting on the war from both the Afghan and NATO sides of the conflict. Sara spent one year covering the war in Afghanistan. She reported from the frontline, entrenched with coalition forces. Sara covered terrorist attacks and political unrest, and followed the rebuilding of the country. She worked largely on her own while there. Despite many restrictions on the activities of women in Afghanistan, Sara said she never faced a situation where she was denied interviews with officials or religious leaders. She was permitted entrance to the private homes of women – forbidden to male reporters – which allowed her more access in her role as a foreign correspondent. In a society segregated by gender, Sara said that being a female reporter allowed her "to have access to women to be able to tell their stories – and that's really important. In a place like Afghanistan women and children make up almost three quarters of the population so it's crucial that their voices are heard." After almost twelve years as a foreign correspondent, she returned to Australia from Afghanistan to become the ABC's regional and rural affairs correspondent.

In August 2013, Sara joined the long-running ABC program, Foreign Correspondent.

In October 2016, the ABC announced that Sara was returning to Africa as the broadcaster's Africa correspondent, based in Nairobi, Kenya.

She has reported from more than 40 countries, including Iraq, Afghanistan, Lebanon, Sierra Leone, Sudan, Zimbabwe, and South Africa.

From 2020 until the end of 2024, she presented The World Today, a weekday radio current affairs program on ABC Radio.

In November 2024, it was announced that Sara would be taking over from Patricia Karvelas as host of RN Breakfast. She will present Summer Breakfast from 16 December 2024 until 3 January 2025, with the full new line-up starting on 20 January. Starting at the earlier timeslot of 5:30am AEDT, Sara will be joined by political correspondent Melissa Clarke, business correspondent Peter Ryan, and news presenter Luke Siddham Dundon.

== Other activities ==
Sara has written for the Boston Globe and The New York Times.

She wrote a chapter in the book South Africa, Lesotho & Swaziland (2004) by Mary Fitzpatrick. She also contributed a chapter in Travellers' Tales Stories from ABC TV's Foreign Correspondents, published in 2004.

Sara is the author of the book Gogo Mama, which tells the diverse stories of 12 women from different African countries.

In February 2013, Sara released the first of a 12-part online series called Mama Asia on the ABC website, inspired by Gogo Mama. She spent a week with most of the women featured in the project, getting to know them and their families. It developed into a television series so that it could include photography and audio. It is a long-form journalism series. Sara interviewed an Afghan helicopter pilot, Latifa Nabizada; a pioneering Thai Buddhist monk, Bhikkhuni Dhammananda; a South Korean leprosy sufferer; a sheep shearer from beyond the Gobi Desert; a matriarch from the slums of Mumbai; a survivor of the Hiroshima atomic bomb; Filipina human rights activist and rape survivor Hilda Narciso; and the survivor of an acid attack in Bangladesh. The women's stories were published each month beginning from February 2013 to December 2013.

In 2021, Sara's first play, Stop Girl, premiered at the Belvoir Street Theatre in Sydney. It ran from 20 March to 25 April 2021, to good reviews, after five years in the writing. The story begins in Kabul, where the lead character is a war correspondent, and moves to Sydney. In researching for the show, Sara interviewed all the real people who inspired the characters in her play, which, she said, gave greater depth to her writing. About the play, she said "The play wasn't so much therapy as a way of reclaiming the events, turning an awful experience into something positive".

== Recognition and awards ==
In September 2007, Sara was awarded the Elizabeth Neuffer Fellowship for human rights journalism, that recognises women in journalism, and entails study overseas. She was a visiting fellow at the Center for International Studies at the Massachusetts Institute of Technology.

Sara was made a Member of the Order of Australia on 26 January 2011, "For service to journalism and to the community as a foreign correspondent raising awareness of international issues and as a reporter on rural Australia".

Sara was recognised by St Mark's College as a Distinguished Collegian in 2012, and in September of that year was named as an Ochberg Fellow at the Dart Centre at Columbia University in New York.

Sara has won many awards in her career, both domestic and international, starting with a few in her first job at Outback Radio 2WEB, and including four UN Media Peace Awards (as of 2024). She was named South Australian Young Journalist of the Year and Queensland Journalist of the Year.

Sara won three awards in the Dalgety Award for Excellence in Rural Journalism in 1993, and won the John Douglas Pringle Award (aka British Prize for Journalism) in 1999.

Sara has been a finalist in the Walkley Awards for Excellence in Journalism many times and in 2017 she won a Walkley for her report on famine in Somaliland. She has also won a second Walkley, for radio reporting.

In 2010, her book Gogo Mama was nominated for the best non-fiction book in the Walkley Awards.

In March 2011, her story on the Pakistan floods was nominated for a Logie Award for Most Outstanding News Coverage. In April 2011, Sara was awarded the Silver Medal at the New York Festivals Television and Film Awards Gala at the NAB Show in Las Vegas for her story "Standing on the Sky".

In October 2016, Sara was named as a finalist for the 6th AACTA Awards for her story on #BlackLivesMatter.

She has also been nominated twice for the Graham Perkin Award.

== Personal life ==
Sara is a state Masters Athletics champion, and won a silver medal at the Australian Masters Athletics Championships in 2007.

Sara has a younger brother, Tyson, a defence industry strategist who happened to be in Afghanistan at the same time she was there.

To help her recover from the trauma of what she experienced while in Kandahar, Afghanistan, she consulted a psychologist specialising in trauma therapy for several years after her return.

Sara speaks Zulu. She is a friend of journalist Leigh Sales.
