= Christopher St Lawrence =

Christopher St Lawrence may refer to:

- Christopher St Lawrence, 2nd Baron Howth (died 1462 or 1465), Anglo-Irish nobleman
- Christopher St Lawrence, 5th Baron Howth (c.1485–1542), Anglo-Irish nobleman
- Christopher St Lawrence, 8th Baron Howth (died 1589), Irish politician and peer
- Christopher St Lawrence, 10th Baron Howth (c. 1568–1619), Anglo-Irish statesman and soldier

== See also ==
- Christopher Lawrence (disambiguation)
