= Richard Aedy =

Australian journalist

Richard Aedy is an Australian journalist. He currently presents the Australian Broadcasting Corporation's ABC Local Radio program Sunday Profile. He also presented the Radio National technology program "The Buzz" in 2001. Aedy presented "Life Matters" from 2006 to 2011. He was a 2004–05 Reuters Institute for the Study of Journalism fellow.
