= Tony Barrell (broadcaster) =

British-born Australian broadcaster

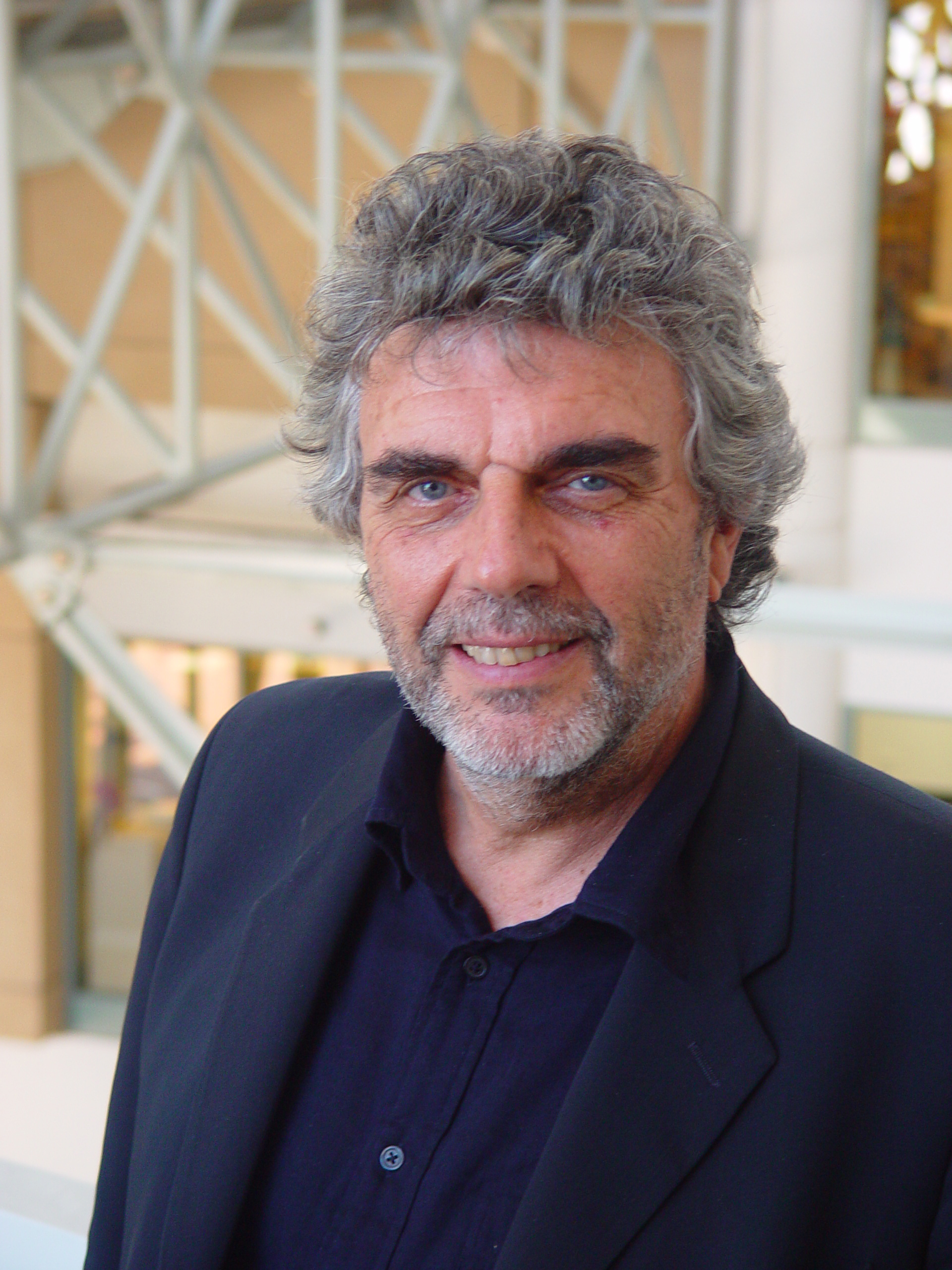
- Born: 7 May 1940; Cheshire, UK
- Died: 31 March 2011 (aged 70); Sydney, Australia
- Education: The King's School, Chester; University of Liverpool
- Occupations: Broadcaster, writer, journalist
- Years active: 1965–2011
- Employer: Australian Broadcasting Corporation
- Spouse: Jane Norris

Anthony Barrell (7 May 1940 – 31 March 2011) was an English writer and broadcaster who lived in Sydney, Australia. He produced several award-winning radio and television documentaries for the Australian Broadcasting Corporation and the BBC World Service, usually with a focus on Asia and particularly Japan.

== Early life ==
Barrell was born in Cheshire, England, in 1940; both his parents and most of his family came from the Suffolk town of Stowmarket. His maternal grandmother, née Florence Laflin, had a family tree linking her through an unbroken line of agricultural labourers to the end of the sixteenth century.

He was brought up in the Welsh town of Mold in Flintshire and went to The King's School, Chester, in 1951, and then Liverpool University from 1958 to 1961, where he obtained a degree in economics. He was a student journalist and edited the literary magazine Sphinx. The magazine's covers were designed by Bill Harry who later edited Mersey Beat. In Liverpool, thanks to a friendship with the London teenage pop poet Royston Ellis, he met George Harrison and Stuart Sutcliffe, the Beatle who was a promising young artist but died of a brain haemorrhage in Hamburg in 1962.

== London years ==
Barrell moved to London in 1961 and lived for some years with Roger Deakin, author of Waterlog, in a flat they shared in Bayswater. He worked as a writer and researcher for Pathé Films from 1965 to 1969 and made journeys to shoot Pathe Pictorial in Morocco, Bermuda, Florida, New York and Hong Kong. In 1967, he met film designer Jane Norris and together they began visiting the Greek island of Lesbos. Norris started the design shop Ace Notions in Camden Town, London, which was later shared with the new wave fashion house Swanky Modes. Barrell co-wrote Superslave, a comic book for adults, with illustrator Bill Stair, which was published by Penguin Books in 1972. He also wrote a long profile of Captain Beefheart (Don van Vliet) for Zig Zag magazine, during his UK tour with the Magic Band in 1973.

== Move to Sydney ==
Following the excesses of the Three-Day Week and the IRA bombing campaign of 1974 (and the birth of their daughter Klio), Barrell and Norris moved to Sydney, where they lived together in the same house in Balmain. Barrell was hired by the Australian Broadcasting Corporation (ABC) in 1975 to write and produce ideas and stories for their 'youth station' 2JJ (later Triple J). He and producer/engineer, Graeme Bartlett, developed the style of "cut up" radio shows through Sunday Afternoon at the Movies, Shipbuilding For Pleasure (the latter show, hosted by Graeme Bartlett, aired on 2JJJ during the late 1980s), and Watching the Radio with the TV Off.These shows were the aural equivalents of the avant-garde cut-up: a montage of interviews, location sound, music and found audio, comedy shows, mystery stories and contemporary pop (avant garde and mainstream) to create new narratives - a style that was later re-invented by ABC Radio National's Radio Eye and The Night Air program (both shows now defunct). Barrell was founder producer of these two shows and continued to work on the latter towards the end of his career. Among those Barrell interviewed for Triple J were Brian Eno, Hunter S. Thompson, Johnny Rotten (né John Lydon), John Cale, and members of bands such as Madness, Wire and Cabaret Voltaire.

Barrell worked with Rick Tanaka for Triple J on The Nippi Rock Shop—a program on pop culture and politics of Japan—for thirteen years. People featured in the programme included The Yellow Magic Orchestra (Ryuichi Sakamoto, Haruomi Hosono and Yukihiro Takahashi), Sandii and Makoto of Sandii & the Sunsetz and other people from all walks of Japanese life. The pair also made a groundbreaking series of radio documentaries Japan's Other Voices for the ABC's Radio National network's Background Briefing program in 1984. Tony and Rick wrote articles for Australian Rolling Stone, Kyoto Journal and, for a while, were Sydney correspondents for the newsletter Tokyo Insider.

== The 1980s ==
Barrell made a four-part radio documentary series in the UK in 1987. Two parts, Welcome to the Post-Industrial Museum and Militants on Merseyside, were about the industrial decline of Liverpool and the control of the city council by the Militant tendency; and the other two were about the British press. The Wapping Truth was the story of the Wapping dispute that followed the relocation of News International papers from Fleet Street to Wapping, and Nothing Left to Read was an examination of the perceived bias of most British newspapers in favour of the government of Margaret Thatcher. The programmes included interviews with author Linda Melvern, Tony Benn MP and the then-editor of the New Statesman, John Lloyd.

In 1988, the last year of Ronald Reagan's presidency, Barrell toured the US to make a five-part radio series Choice of America which visited Los Angeles, Houston, New Orleans, Boston, Washington and New York City. Notable interviewees included John Kenneth Galbraith, Jim Garrison (the New Orleans attorney who was later the subject of Oliver Stone's JFK movie), and former New York City mayor John Lindsay. The second part of the series, What Happened to Houston, won an award at the New York Festival.

In 1989, Barrell won the Australian Writers' Guild award (known as an AWGIE) for radio for his play about the American poet Hart Crane, Lost at Sea. The play also featured the Japanese kabuki performer Danzō Ichikawa VII. Both Danzo and Crane committed suicide by jumping off ferry boats—and it explored ideas of synchronicity and the concept of 'dying at the right time' in the context of western and Japanese culture.

In 1989, Barrell was associate producer for the four-part ABC-KCET television documentary series Power in the Pacific, a survey of ongoing impact of the Pacific War and the Cold War in the Asia-Pacific. The series was filmed in Japan, China, South Korea, the Philippines (Manila and Cebu), the Marianas (Saipan), Papua-Nugini. The episode he directed, "Japan Comes First", also won a medal at the New York Festival in 1990 and the series was broadcast in Japan by NHK 2.

== The 1990s ==
In 1993, Barrell produced a radio documentary, Cheers, about the Sydney Swans football team of which he was a passionate supporter.

In 1994, in the immediate aftermath of the genocidal massacres, Barrell travelled as field producer for ABC's Foreign Correspondent on assignment to Rwanda (with reporter Peter George).

In 1995, he visited Tokyo to record interviews for a feature to commemorate the 9–10 March 1945 bombing which destroyed much of the city with incendiary bombs and was, arguably, the first strategic use of napalm against civilians. The Tokyo's Burning feature broadcast by ABC Radio National's Radio Eye won the RAI special prize at the Prix Italia that year in Bologna. Barrell also produced the story of the atomic bombing of Nagasaki that year—Don't Forget Nagasaki won a United Nations Association of Australia Media Peace Prize for radio. The fire-bombing story was central to the book written with Rick Tanaka Higher than Heaven (published by Private Guy International, designed by ARMEDIA).

In 1996, the two made a new kind of radio program, a survey of the world's cities still running trams or light rail systems. They invited citizens of Tallinn (Estonia), New Orleans, Nagasaki (Japan) and Mainz (Germany) to send cassettes of their rides on local trams. The result was broadcast in a feature by Radio Eye, but what made it different and special, was that it was accompanied by a dedicated website titled Trammit!, the wider story of light rail trams and street cars throughout the world. It was designed by Tanaka and Eddy Jokovich from ARMEDIA. Trammit! was removed in 2005, but it was probably a first of its kind (a radio show with a website), at least in Australia. That same year Barrell and Rick Tanaka visited Okinawa to make more radio programs for the ABC and research their book Okinawa Dreams OK (1997).

In 1997, Barrell visited the northern Japanese town of Maki in Niigata to record a story about the town's decision to vote against the siting of a genpatsu (nuclear power station) nearby, the first such referendum to successfully block a genpatsu. The story was broadcast by ABC Radio National's Indian Pacific program.

== 2000 onwards ==
In 2000, Tony created (with sound engineer Russell Stapleton and researcher/translator Rick Tanaka) a major audio study of montage and collage, both visual and audio. It was broadcast by the ABC's Listening Room (now defunct). The ABC website carries Must You See the Joins?, an illustrated article about the great collagists including the veteran Japanese artist Kimura Tsuneihisa who celebrated his 80th birthday in 2008.

In 2000, Barrell was commissioned to produce a one-off report for the ABC TV's leading currents affairs program Four Corners, a study of how the service industries have grown and changed Australia's working life. "The Business of Change" was shot in Sydney and included scenes at the now-defunct One.Tel telco, interviews with life coaches, dog walkers and other 'new' professions.

In 2002, Barrell's Japan expertise earned him a commission to present the BBC World Service co-production (with the ABC) of six radio documentaries broadcast in the run up to the 2002 FIFA World Cup held in South Korea and Japan in May 2002. A feature about the older parts of Tokyo, called What Tokyo, shared the 2004 Prix Marulic, awarded at the annual drama and documentary festival sponsored by Croatian radio—HRTV—on the island of Hvar.

Also in 2003, BBC World Service and ABC sent Tony to Singapore, Vietnam and Okinawa for a series about the effect of Chinese and Confucian values in the Asian region. The Okinawa program, Live Slow Live Long, focussed on the island peoples' claim to be the oldest in the world, and included interviews with a centenarian who said the secret of her longevity was to work every day, sleep every day, eat plenty of Okinawa's national dish chanpurū (which includes pork and 'bitter melon' known in Okinawa as goya) and take a little awamori, Okinawa's own drink distilled from Thai sweet rice. Barrell made a third series for these two broadcasting networks in 2004 when he visited the Russian Far East—Sakhalin island, Vladivostok and Khabarovsk. In 2005 his book of the series The Real Far East was published by the independent Melbourne company Scribe. In 2006, Barrell presented Rice Bowl Tales, a fourth series for the BBC and Radio National about the rice cultures of Asia.

Barrell was working with his wife on a DVD film about their many visits to Molivos, Lesbos and a book on the same subject. He retired from full-time employment with the ABC in May 2008, and had hoped to complete work on his own story—Your Island My Island—in 2009. He died on 31 March 2011 of an apparent heart attack.

In 2011 the Australian musician Paul Gough (aka Pimmon) dedicated his The Oansome Orbit album (released on Room40) to Tony Barrell.

== Bibliography ==
- Barrell, Tony (1972). Superslave. Illustrated by Bill Stair. Penguin Books.
- Higher Than Heaven, Barrell, Tony & Tanaka, Rick, 1995, Private Guy International, Sydney.
- Okinawa Dreams OK, Barrell, Tony & Tanaka, Rick, 1996, Die Gestalten Verlag, Berlin.
- — (Autumn 2010). "How many miles?". Reportage. Griffith Review. 27: 86–88.
