= Kel Richards =

Australian author

- Born: Kelvin Barry Richards; 8 February 1946 (age 80); Sydney, New South Wales, Australia
- Occupations: Author, broadcaster, journalist
- Employer: 2CH

Kelvin Barry "Kel" Richards (born 8 February 1946) is an Australian author, journalist, broadcaster and lay Christian.

Born in Sydney, Richards has written a series of crime novels and thrillers for adult readers which includes The Case of the Vanishing Corpse, Death in Egypt and An Outbreak of Darkness.

Richards presented ABC NewsRadio's weekend afternoons, which included regular Wordwatch segments until 15 August 2010. Wordwatch was a feature introduced by Richards. Initially developed as a "filler" program for the radio programs to allow time for changes of people or locations, it tapped into an interest by the listening public and several books have been produced based on the show's research. In November 2003 the thousandth episode of the show was produced.

Kel Richards more recently presented Sydney radio station 2CH's Sunday night program "Sunday Night with Kel Richards".

He is a lay canon at St Andrew's Cathedral, Sydney, and the author of The Aussie Bible (2003), which has sold over 100,000 copies. The Aussie Bible translates sections of the Bible into Australian vernacular. He followed it up in 2006 with More Aussie Bible.

== Bibliography ==
=== Crime novels ===
Ben Bartholomew series

- The Case of the Vanishing Corpse (Hodder & Stoughton, 1990)
- The Case of the Secret Assassin (Hodder & Stoughton, 1992)
- The Case of the Damascus Dagger (Hodder & Stoughton, 1994)
- The Case of the Dead Certainty (Hodder & Stoughton, 1995)

Mark Roman mysteries

- The Second Death (Coronet Books, 1993)
- The Third Bloodstain (Hodder & Stoughton, 1995)

Sherlock Holmes: Tales of Terror

- Curse of the Pharaohs (Beacon Communications, c. 1997)
- The Headless Monk (Beacon Communications, c. 1997)
- The Vampire Serpent (Beacon, 1997)

C. S. Lewis mysteries

- C. S. Lewis and the Body in the Basement ( Strand Publishing, 2013)
- C. S. Lewis and the Country House Murders (2014)
- The Floating Corpse (Strand Publishing, 2015)
- The Sinister Student : A 1930s Murder Mystery (Marylebone House, 2016)
- The Floating Body: A 1930s Murder Mystery (2016)

Other works

- Moonlight Shadows (Hodder & Stoughton, 1994)
- Death in Egypt : a Murder Mystery (Hodder & Stoughton, 1996)
- Dark Storm (2004)

=== Short stories ===
- "The Amateur Hangman", More Crimes for a Summer Christmas edited by Stephen Knight (1991)

=== Adaptations ===
- The Ballad of the Two Sons (Anzea Publishers, c 1993) illustrated by Meng
- Aussie Yarns (c. 2004)
- Aussie Pilgrim's Progress : John Bunyan's immortal story (2006)
- An Aussie Christmas Carol : Charles Dickens' immortal tale retold as an Aussie bush yarn (2007)

=== Children's picture books ===
- The Lamington Man (1997) with Glen Singleton
- Gumtree Gully : A 'Two Ways to Live' Bush Yarn (2005)
- Goldilocks and the Three Koalas (2009)
- The Three Kangaroos Gruff (2009)
- Jacko and the Beanstalk (2013)
- Big Book of Aussie Dinosaurs (2014)
- Little Red Riding Hoodie (2014)
- Snowy White and the Seven Wombats (2015)

=== Non-fiction ===
- The Aussie Bible (2003)
- ABC Classic FM's Word of the Day (2004) with Clive Robertson
- The Story of Australian English
- Word Map: What words are Used Where in Australia (ABC Books, 2005) with the Macquarie Dictionary
- Word of the day 2: Wordwatching: a Wonderful Look into the World of Words (ABC Books, 2006)
- More Aussie Bible (2006)
- Flash Jim: James Hardy Vaux, convicted fraudster, transported 3 times, author of Australia's first dictionary (2021)

=== Television writing ===
- Murder Call TV episodes

– Deadfall (1998)
– A Blow to the Heart (1999)
– House of Spirits (2000)
– A Stab in the Dark (2000)
