= The World Today (Australian radio program) =

Australian radio program

- Genre: News and current affairs
- Country of origin: Australia
- Language(s): English
- Home station: ABC Radio National and ABC Local Radio
- Hosted by: Andy Park
- Original release: 21 June 1999
- Website: www.abc.net.au/radio/programs/worldtoday/

The World Today is an Australian current affairs program which delivers national and international news and analysis to radio and online audiences nationally and throughout the region. It is broadcast on the ABC Radio National and ABC Local Radio networks.

== History ==
The show first aired on 21 June 1999.

In June 2020, the ABC announced that Eleanor Hall would be stepping down from her role from August, after 19 years of hosting the program. Sally Sara has been announced as her replacement.

== Presenters ==
- John Highfield
- Monica Attard
- Richard Palfreyman
- Eleanor Hall (2001–2020)
- Thomas Oriti (2020)
- Sally Sara (2020–2024)
- Andy Park (2025–present)

== See also ==
- ABC News at Noon
