= Patricia Karvelas =

Australian journalist (born 1981)

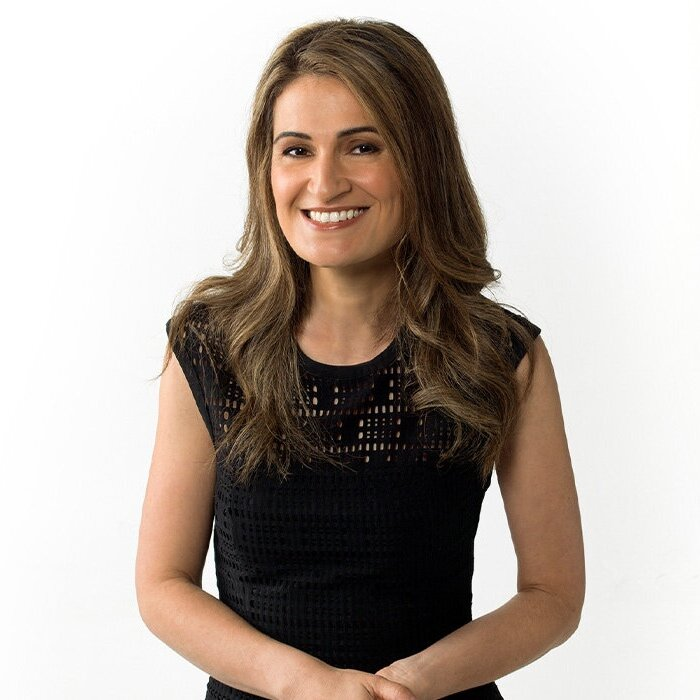
- Born: 28 January 1981 (age 45); Sunshine, Victoria
- Other name: PK
- Education: RMIT University
- Occupations: Radio and television presenter
- Known for: Current affairs, journalism and political correspondence
- Awards: Wallace Brown Young Journalist Award (2008)

Patricia Karvelas (born 28 January 1981) is an Australian radio presenter, current affairs journalist and political correspondent.

Karvelas hosted Breakfast on ABC Radio National from 2021 until 2024.

== Early life ==
Karvelas was born in Australia to Greek migrants who moved to Melbourne in the late 1960s. Her father was from the village of Foinikounta in the Peloponnese region of Greece. When Karvelas was 8 years old, both her parents died suddenly and she lived with her maternal grandmother and later her two older sisters, Voula and Sue in Carlton.

Karvelas attended a number of schools but completed her senior schooling years at University High School and graduated from RMIT University.

== Early career ==
Karvelas' journalism career began around 1994 when, as a young teenager, she joined the community radio station 3CR Melbourne. She hosted programs such as Wednesday Breakfast and Girl Zone. By the age of 15 she was also a guest presenter at 3RRR. Karvelas stayed at 3CR until 2000 when she briefly worked for the ABC and SBS.

== Career at The Australian ==
=== Trampled by a police horse as a cadet ===
Karvelas started working as a cadet journalist for the newspaper The Australian around 2002. In November 2002, while covering the protests against the WTO in Sydney, Karvelas was knocked over and trampled by a police horse that was being utilised to charge into and disperse the protestors. She was severely injured and sent to hospital with a suspected broken pelvis. She was later discharged after being treated for a head wound and severe bruising to her lower abdominal area.

=== Welfare reform reporting ===
From 2004 Karvelas authored a number of articles in The Australian that gave favourable coverage to the Howard government's tough reforms on welfare. These articles were written under headlines such as "Tougher checks for job cheats", "Welfare cut would save $100 million", "Toughen rules on teenage mums", and "Tougher dole for shirkers". It has been stated that labelling the long-term unemployed by terms such as "shirkers" was rhetoric designed to facilitate the introduction of measures that punished this low socio-economic group.

=== Indigenous affairs reporting ===
During her tenure at The Australian, Karvelas became noted for reporting on Indigenous affairs during a time when highly significant policies such as the Northern Territory Intervention and the Apology to Australia's Indigenous peoples were occurring.

Karvelas wrote articles such as "Crusade to save aboriginal kids: Howard declares 'National Emergency' to end abuse" that were supportive of the Liberal Party's Intervention in the Northern Territory. In 2007, she wrote a piece under the title of "Aborigines must learn English", which argued that Aboriginal children should not be taught their own languages at school. The article blamed bilingual schooling as the cause of the children's "failure", and that they should only be taught in English. The article ignored the lack of government funding for these schools as a possible cause of poor outcomes.

When the Australian Labor Party took power later in 2007, Karvelas argued for the continuation of the Intervention through such articles as "Labor is 'destroying' NT intervention", "How Macklin took on the Left to transform indigenous policy", "Fast track on return of permit system" and "Agency to force NT truant kids from bed to classroom". In her 2008 piece "Labor to overhaul Native Title laws", Karvelas implied that Aboriginal people needed intervention into the control of finances earned from mining to prevent them from being "frittered away".

When Kevin Rudd gave the Apology to Australia's Indigenous peoples in 2008, Karvelas' article "Wording divides Indigenous leaders" focused on the divisions in the opinions on the Apology between prominent Aboriginal people.

Karvelas also produced articles in 2013 such as "Overhaul township leases, says Council" that promoted the newly elected Abbott government's push to secure 99-year leases over Aboriginal townships, a plan that caused widespread distress to Aboriginal communities.

=== The "character assassination" of Larissa Behrendt controversy ===
In 2011, Karvelas wrote a series of articles in The Australian against Aboriginal lawyer and Harvard graduate Larissa Behrendt which amounted to what has been described as a "disgraceful saga of protracted character assassination". Behrendt was a strong opponent of the NT Intervention and was also involved in a racial discrimination legal case against another News Corporation employee in Andrew Bolt. Karvelas' articles attempted to portray Behrendt as an insincere hypocrite, out-of-touch academic and a "white blackfella" for her writing a tweet against pro-Intervention advocate Bess Price.

Even though Behrendt apologised for the tweet, Karvelas and fellow columnists in The Australian such as Gary Johns (who described Aboriginal culture as being "inconsistent with basic human decency") called for Behrendt's employment at university and government level to be reviewed. Karvelas was afterwards described as "a master of The Australian's familiar false-inference, disguised-assumption, report-as-accusation house style" in her attack on Behrendt. Other commentators have written that the pile-on over Behrendt's tweet left out crucial facts and was a pretext for a campaign against an ideological adversary.

=== Awards and promotions at The Australian ===
Karvelas won the inaugural Wallace Brown Young Achiever Award for Press Gallery Journalism in 2008. She was later promoted to the Victorian Bureau Chief and Senior National Affairs Journalist for The Australian. One of her notable decisions as Bureau Chief was to employ Rachel Baxendale as a cadet in 2012.

== Sky News Australia host ==
From 2016 to 2017, Karvelas became employed at another News Corp media outlet, that being Sky News Australia presenting a weekly program called Karvelas.

== ABC ==
Karvelas joined the ABC in 2015. She presented Radio National's program RN Drive from January 2015 to 2021 and hosted Afternoon Briefing, a national affairs television program on the ABC News channel, from 2018 to 2021. She has also co-hosted a weekly political podcast, The Party Room, with Fran Kelly since April 2016. In 2018, she commenced as host of the weekly interview-based national affairs program National Wrap.

In 2019, Karvelas conducted an interview with Deputy Prime Minister Barnaby Joyce who tried to pin the blame on the Queensland Labor government for a controversial $80 million water buyback scheme by simply repeating "Labor, Labor, Labor, Labor" several times.

In 2019 and 2020, she spoke at WOMADelaide.

In November 2021, ABC announced that Karvelas would host RN Breakfast on ABC Radio National replacing Fran Kelly.

From mid-2023, Karvelas was the host of discussion panel program Q+A, until the show was cancelled in June 2025.

In November 2024, it was announced that Karvelas would leave RN Breakfast to take up other cross-platform roles within the ABC from January 2025.

In January 2025, Karvelas returned to host Afternoon Briefing on the ABC News channel.

Beginning February 2025, Karvelas hosted the ABC's politics podcast, Politics Now, combined with her weekly podcast, The Party Room

== Personal life ==
Karvelas is Greek-Australian. Her parents originate from the Peloponnese region of Greece. She has two daughters (aged 9 and 11 in 2021) with her wife. She identifies as a member of the LGBTQIA+ community and has become increasingly open about this over time.
