= Paul Barclay =

Australian writer, journalist, radio presenter and producer

Paul Barclay is an Australian writer, journalist, radio presenter and producer.

== Biography ==
Barclay was born in Melbourne.

Since the late 1990s, he has worked as a radio presenter for the Australian Broadcasting Corporation in Queensland, Northern Territory, and Victoria. In 2005, Barclay won the Walkley Award for his investigation of the events and issues surrounding Australia's notorious Philip Nitschke, "Dr Death".

Barclay has produced stories on most of the ABC radio networks for over 20 years. As of 2021 he is a regular host and presenter on Radio National's program Big Ideas, a program he has hosted since at least 2003.
