= ABC Radio Hobart =

936 ABC Hobart

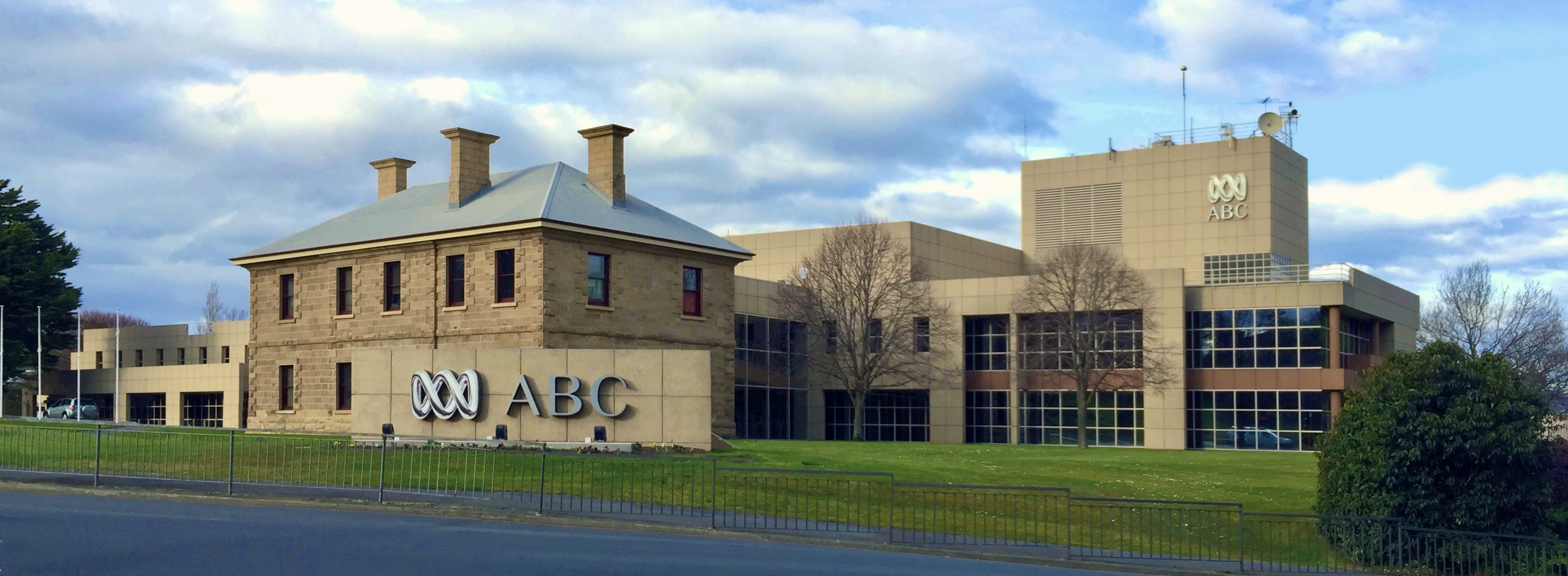
- Hobart, Tasmania; Australia
- Broadcast area: Hobart
- Frequency: 936 kHz AM

Programming
- Language: English
- Format: Talk

Ownership
- Owner: Australian Broadcasting Corporation

History
- First air date: 22 June 1938; 88 years ago

Technical information
- Licensing authority: Australian Communications and Media Authority
- Transmitter coordinates: 42.9254°S 147.4985°E

Links
- Website: www.abc.net.au/hobart/

936 ABC Hobart (call sign: 7ZR) is the ABC Local Radio station for Hobart, Tasmania, owned by the Australian Broadcasting Corporation.

== History ==
Officially opened on 22 June 1938, plans surrounding the initial broadcast of 7ZR were forced to be amended due to a cable fault between Tasmania and the mainland. The opening broadcast was intended to be part of a national program with prime minister Joseph Lyons declaring the station officially open in a live broadcast from Canberra. However, because of the fault, the opening broadcast was a statewide program rather than a national program with Lyons pre-recording his opening remarks which were then played during the opening broadcast.

An array of dignitaries gathered at Hadley's Hotel in Hobart to listen to the inaugural broadcast on 7ZR. Among the official party were ABC general manager Charles Moses, ABC board member Elizabeth Couchman, ABC music director William G. James, and Hobart mayor John Soundy.

Prior to Lyon's opening address, Liet-Governor Sir John Evans spoke live from the 7NT studios in Launceston where he was fulfilling a vice-regal engagement.

In a nationwide rebrand in 2000, ABC stations across Australia stopped using their original callsigns with capital city ABC stations instead incorporating their frequency into their new name. As a result, 7ZR followed suit and became 936 ABC Hobart.

As part of a further nationwide rebrand of ABC stations in 2017, the name of the station changed from 936 ABC Hobart to 936 ABC Hobart.

== Programming ==
936 ABC Hobart broadcasts a variety of local programs from its Hobart studios including Breakfast, Mornings, The Country Hour, Your Afternoon, Drive and Evenings.

The station also broadcasts a weekend edition of Breakfast, a local Saturday morning sport program Local Grandstand and a Sunday Mornings program.

All local programs on 936 ABC Hobart with the exception Breakfast and Drive are simulcast on ABC Northern Tasmania in Launceston.

Since 2021, the national current affairs program AM has originated from the 936 ABC Hobart studios after its presenter Sabra Lane relocated to Tasmania from the mainland. Lane is known for always introducing AM with the palawa kani name for Hobart by saying "Good Morning and welcome to AM, I'm Sabra Lane coming to you from nipaluna / Hobart..."

All other national programs on 936 ABC Hobart originate from ABC stations on the mainland.

The longest-serving presenters to have worked at 936 ABC Hobart include Bob Curé OAM, Ric Paterson, Ken Short, Chris Wisbey, Tim Cox, Annie Warburton, Stan Murrowood, Louise Saunders and Ryk Goddard among others.

=== Breakfast presenters ===
Bob Curé OAM is believed to be the longest serving Breakfast presenter at the station, starting at 7ZR in 1967 and retiring in 1997. He died in 2014.

Ric Paterson took over Breakfast from Curé, hosting the show until his own retirement in 2006. In 2003, Sir Guy Green named Paterson as Tasmanian of the Year, in part due to his involvement in establishing the ABC's annual Giving Tree appeal.

Upon his retirement, Paterson was replaced on Breakfast with Andy Muirhead who began hosting the show on 29 January 2007. Muirhead's radio career came to an abrupt end in 2010 when he was charged with accessing child pornography. He was immediately stood down from the ABC and in 2012, he pleaded guilty to the charges, blaming his roles as ABC Hobart's Breakfast presenter and as host of the national ABC TV show Collectors as the reason he was driven to look at child pornography as a way to "relax". He was sentenced to a total of ten months in prison. He was released early in January 2013 and placed on the Tasmanian sex offenders register until 2018.

After Muirhead's sudden exit from the station in June 2010, the breakfast program was temporarily taken over by Michael Veitch who had joined the station earlier in the year as Afternoons presenter before Ryk Goddard was permanently appointed to the position in 2011. Goddard continues to host Breakfast from Monday to Thursday each week. In November 2022, the ABC found Goddard had breached their editorial standards for accuracy after making inaccurate comments on Breakfast about Gina Rinehart and her father Lang Hancock.

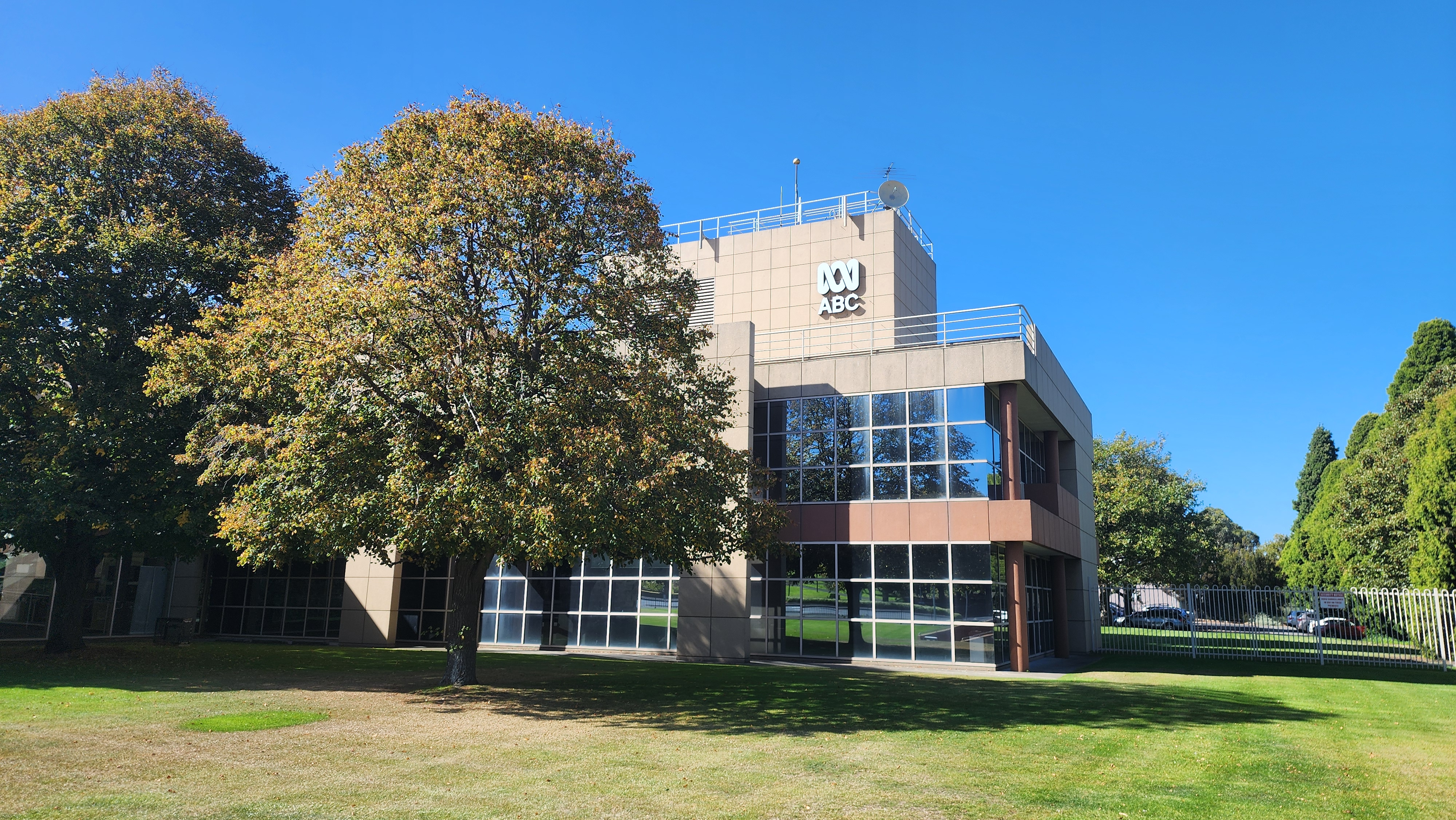
Close view to the building

== Transmission ==
It currently broadcasts on 936 kHz on the AM band. Originally the station broadcast on 1160 kHz, in 1953 switched to 940 kHz, and in 1978 to the present frequency.

936 ABC Hobart also operates a low power repeater station covering the Orford and Triabunna area where the AM signal is received poorly. This service broadcasts from Moreys Hill, Triabunna using the FM band on a frequency of 90.5 MHz. ABC Northern Tasmania simulcasts 936 ABC Hobart's programming when not airing local shows for their region.

936 ABC Hobart is also carried on Hobart's National DAB Multiplexers. Transmission sites are at the Broadcast Australia Facility on Mt Wellington and Broadcast Australia's White Rock site. The DAB service varies slightly from the AM/FM version as most of the sport content is carried on national DAB sister station ABC Sport.

== Ratings ==
936 ABC Hobart has performed reasonably well in ratings surveys. It was the most listened-to station in Hobart in 2016 and 2017 before losing some market share to become the third most listened-to station in the city in 2022, falling behind 7HO and Hit 100.9.
