= Norman Swan =

Scottish-Australian doctor (born 1953)

Norman Swan AM FAHMS
- Swan in 2026
- Born: Norman Swirsky; 1953 (age 72–73); Glasgow, Scotland
- Education: University of Aberdeen
- Occupations: Physician, journalist, broadcaster
- Known for: The Health Report on ABC Radio National
- Children: 3, including Jonathan Swan
- Awards: Medal of the Australian Academy of Science (2004) Gold Walkley (1988); Michael Daley Award (1989); UN Media Peace Award (1984 Gold citation); Australian Skeptics Award 2020

Norman Swan (born Norman Swirsky in 1953) is a Scottish-born Australian physician, journalist and broadcaster.

== Life and career ==
Swan was born in Glasgow, Scotland, as Norman Swirsky. He wanted to be an actor, but instead went to medical school at the University of Aberdeen graduating in 1976. He later tried unsuccessfully to attend the Royal Academy of Dramatic Art. He then continued his postgraduate studies in paediatrics, although he did not complete his training.

Swan moved to Australia to continue his training but transitioned from medicine when he became a producer and broadcaster with the Australian Broadcasting Corporation in 1982. He was the general manager of ABC Radio National (RN) for three years from 1990 and in that time increased the audience by 30%. He overhauled the schedule, created the RN current affairs breakfast program and recruited Phillip Adams, Geraldine Doogue and Wendy Harmer as program presenters. Swan co-hosted the RN program Life Matters between 1996 and 2001, and has produced and presented ABC radio program The Health Report from its inception in 1985. From March 2020 until November 2023 Swan co-hosted Coronacast, a podcast about pandemics and the coronavirus. This has been replaced with a podcast titled What's That Rash.

On ABC TV, Swan has presented both Catalyst and Quantum, is an occasional reporter on Four Corners, including an exposé of egregious doctors' fees. He is currently a regular reporter and commentator on 7.30. On commercial television, he has appeared on the Australian version of The Biggest Loser as the resident health expert.

Swan was awarded the Gold Walkley in 1988 for revealing scientific fraud conducted by gynaecologist William McBride. Swan's investigation sent "shock waves throughout the medical world" and led to McBride's deregistration as a medical practitioner. Swan has won four Walkley Awards, (the latest in 2020 for Coronacast), the 2020 Australian Skeptics Award, a Media Peace Award from the United Nations Association of Australia and the highest honour in Australian science journalism, the Michael Daley Award. Swan was also awarded the Medal of the Australian Academy of Science in 2004. He was elected a Fellow of the Australian Academy of Health and Medical Sciences in 2022.

Swan with his book The Brain Cliff at Adelaide University, 2026

Two books of his became bestsellers, So You Think You Know What's Good For You (2021 Hachette Australia) and So You Want To Live Younger Longer (2022 Hachette). The latest is So You Want to Know What's Good For your Kids, also published by Hachette in July 2024.

== Personal life ==
Swan married Kate Hamann, an ABC radio producer, in June 2024. It is his third marriage after being divorced twice.

Swan's son Jonathan is a political correspondent, firstly for The Sydney Morning Herald and The Age, then The Hill, Axios, and currently the New York Times. Swan's daughter Anna was seriously injured in an electric bike accident on a 2016 trip to Italy. Swan experienced post-traumatic stress disorder (PTSD), blaming himself for not hiring helmets for the bikes, as well as a result of being injured in a bus explosion at age 14.

Swan was appointed as a Member the Order of Australia (AM) in the 2023 Australia Day Honours for "significant service to the broadcast media as a science and health commentator".

== Bibliography ==
- Swan, Norman (2021). So You Think You Know What's Good For You?. Sydney, N.S.W.: Hachette Australia. ISBN 978-0-7336-4676-8. OCLC 1231994364.
- Swan, Norman (2022). So You Want to Live Younger Longer?: The ultimate guide to longevity from Australia s most trusted doctor. Hachette Australia. ISBN 9780733648342. OCLC 1316700056.
- Swan, Norman (2024). So You Want to Know What's Good for Your Kids?: The ultimate parenting guide on what matters from birth to ten by one of Australia's most trusted doctors. Hachette Australia. ISBN 9780733650727. OCLC 1432656745.
