= Correspondents Report =

Australian radio program

- Genre: News and current affairs
- Country of origin: Australia
- Language: English
- Home station: ABC's Radio National and Local Radio
- Hosted by: Thomas Oriti
- Website: www.abc.net.au/radio/programs/correspondentsreport/

Correspondents Report was a weekend news and current affairs program broadcast on the Australian Broadcasting Corporation's Radio National and ABC Local Radio networks, from at least 1974 until 2019.

== History ==
Correspondents Report has been running since at least 1974.

Freelance reporter Roger East was covering the Indonesian insurgence in 1975, and was first to file the story of the killing of the Balibo Five in October. He was the sole remaining foreign journalist in Portuguese Timor at the time, He filed his last report for Correspondents Report on afternoon of 7 December 1975 before he was executed by Indonesian soldiers the following day.

The last available episode of Correspondents Report is dated 10 February 2019, presented by Thomas Oriti. After this date, the program appears to have been incorporated into Sunday Extra, hosted by Julian Morrow.

== Archives ==
Transcripts of the programs are available from July 1999, and podcasts are available of more recent programs.

== See also ==
- ABC News
