= Radio National =

Australian radio network

ABC Radio National
- Australia
- Frequencies: AM/FM: Various; DVB-T: Ch. 26; DAB+; online

Programming
- Language: English
- Format: News, talk
- Network: ABC Radio

Ownership
- Owner: Australian Broadcasting Corporation

History
- First air date: 5 December 1923; 102 years ago
- Former names: ABC Radio 2 (1947–1985)

Technical information
- Licensing authority: Australian Communications and Media Authority

Links
- Webcast: Live stream
- Website: abc.net.au/radionational/

ABC Radio National (RN) is an Australian public service radio station operated by the Australian Broadcasting Corporation (ABC) since 1923. Its programming consists of news, interviews, and conversations about arts, culture, business, health, science and technology, music, Indigenous culture, religion and ethics.

== History ==
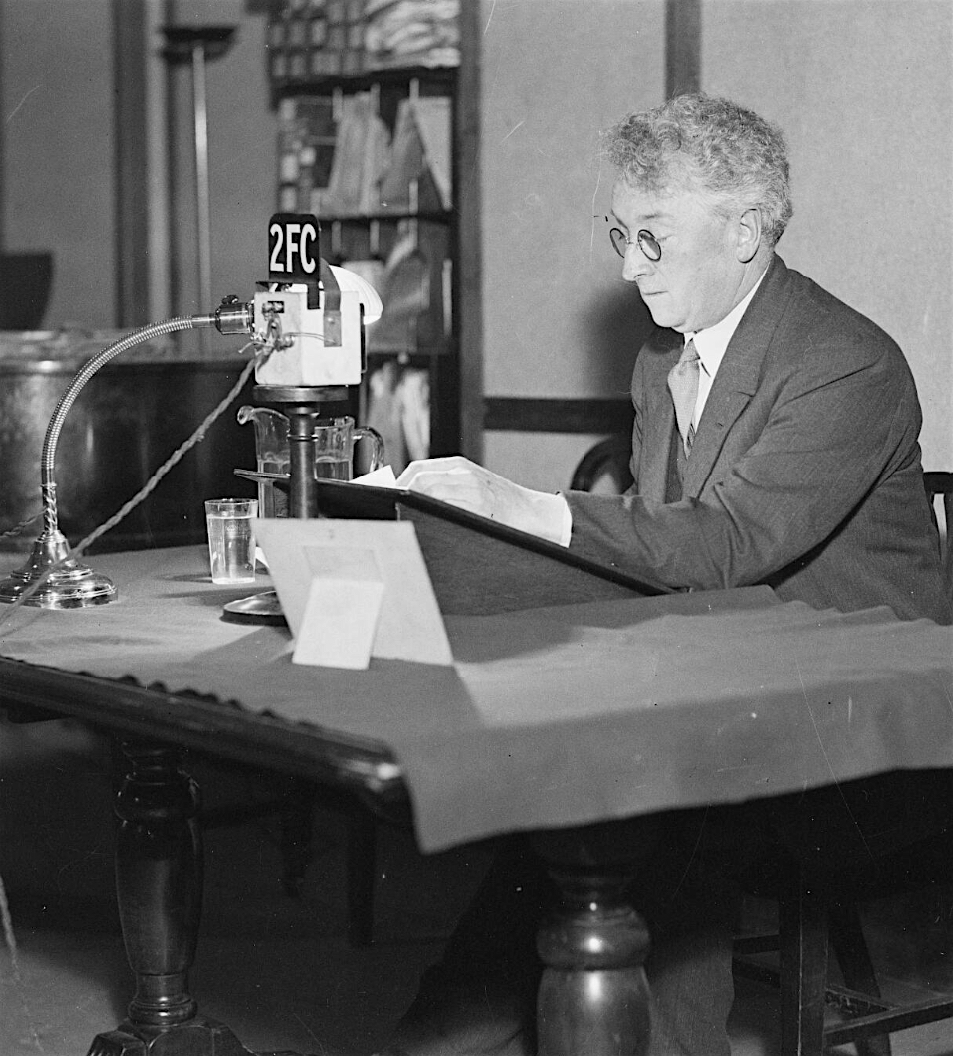
Prime Minister Joseph Lyons preparing to make a broadcast on 2FC Sydney

=== 1920s–1950s: Predecessors and beginnings ===
From 1928, the National Broadcasting Service, as part of the federal Postmaster-General's Department, gradually took over responsibility for all the existing stations that were sponsored by public licence fees ("A" Class licences). The outsourced Australian Broadcasting Company supplied programs from 1929. In 1932 a commission was established, merging the original ABC company and the National Broadcasting Service. It is from this time that Radio National dates as a distinct network within the ABC, in which a system of program relays was developed during the subsequent decades to link stations spread across the nation.

The beginnings of Radio National lie with Sydney radio station 2FC, which aired its first test broadcast on 5 December 1923 and officially went to air on 9 January 1924. 2FC stood for Farmer and Company, the original owner of the station before the ABC bought the station in 1937.

The ABC then rolled out a national network across the country, somewhat similar in nature to the BBC National Programme. The origins of the other stations in the network were:

- 3AR Melbourne – 26 January 1924 "Associated Radio Company of Australia", organised by Esmond Laurence Kiernan and others.
- 5CL Adelaide – 20 November 1924 "Central Broadcasters Ltd".
- 7ZL Hobart – 17 December 1924.
- 4QG Brisbane – 27 July 1925 "Queensland Government" (operated by the Queensland Radio Service, an agency within the Office of the Chief Secretary).
- 6WN Perth – 5 October 1938 "Wanneroo".
- 2CY Canberra – 23 December 1938.
- 2NA Newcastle – 20 December 1943.

The first transmitters for 2FC, 5CL and 4QG were made by AWA with power of 5 kW (Note: Until about 1931 in Australia, transmitter powers were defined in terms of DC input to the final amplifier, typically about three times that of the power into the antenna; thus power today would be stated as about 1.7 kW.) They used a MT7A valve for the final high power RF stage and a MT7B for the modulator. The power supply was 12,000 volts from three-phase power rectified by MR7 valves. 4QG commenced with a 500 Watt transmitter which continued for about 6 months until the 5 kW unit was commissioned.

The radio transmitters for 3AR and 2FC were upgraded to 10 kW in a contract let in 1938 to STC. The transmitters were designed by Charles Strong in London, and were notable in using negative feedback to ensure a high quality flat frequency response.

The power level of 2FC and 3AR was upgraded to 50 kW in the early 1950s. The transmitters for these were housed in the same building as the Radio 1 network. They were manufactured by STC. The final stage contained three parallel 3J/261E air cooled triodes running in class C amplifier at 90% efficiency. These were driven by a class B push-pull modulator with the same type of valves.

=== 1960s–1980s: Broadcast network expansion ===
In the 1970s, the network's program format began to take on a more serious tone, a style which continues to this day. Art critic Peter Timms later remarked that the network is "virtually the only non-print media forum for art in this country".

In the early 1980s the broadcast footprint was extended with the construction of the first of over 300 regional FM transmitters (including community re-broadcast sites). In 1985, the ABC renamed Radio 2 to Radio National.

=== 1990s: Unified branding ===
Since 1990, all Radio National stations have had the same callsign, RN.

As a result of cuts in the 1996–97 budget, Radio National was hit with a reduction of a million dollars in its funding, with a significant impact on programming.

=== 2000s–2010s: Funding and programming cuts ===
In 2008, controversial programming changes once more raised the issue of funding cuts to the public broadcaster. Presenter Stephen Crittenden leaked confidential programming changes in an unscheduled live broadcast before the start of his show, criticising his superiors. He was suspended for his outburst, and his unscripted comments were cut from Radio National's podcast and transcript of the program. Religious commentator Paul Collins on crikey.com subsequently echoed Crittenden's fears. Crittenden was reinstated in 2009 as a reporter on Background Briefing, after a settlement was reached. However, his program and the other eight programs that had been cancelled or merged were not re-instated that year. The head of ABC Radio, Sue Howard, was dismissed in 2009.

In January 2012 Radio National was rebranded as RN, partly in recognition of the station's growing digital audience. RN has also been used as shorthand for the station's name by many presenters going back several years. RN's tagline, which has changed regularly over the years, was also changed to "Your World Unfolding" to mesh with the station's new logo and visual identity.

In 2012 a new Religion and Ethics Report was launched, hosted by Andrew West. The Media Report was also relaunched, hosted by broadcaster and former Life Matters host Richard Aedy. The Media Report was, however, cancelled again in 2015.

In late 2016, the new head of the ABC Michelle Guthrie defended the removal of staff and programmes from the Radio National 2017 schedule, with the scope of the new year's lineup culled due to budget cuts with consequent staff and programming reductions.

=== 2020s: Major changes ===
==== 2025 Relaunch ====
In November 2024, Radio National announced new programmes and schedule designed to relaunch the station in 2025 as "the centre of big conversations and create a space where audiences can expand their worldview while engaging with the world's best thinkers". This was the biggest slate of changes and the largest announcement of new programmes since the 2017 upheaval and cuts.

The new programming schedule commenced on 20 January 2025. The station also changed its logo from the previous "RN" logo to a new "Radio National" logo.

Among the major changes to the station programming included: The return of previous Radio National Breakfast host Fran Kelly with a new news magazine programme at 6 p.m. weeknights called the Radio National Hour and a revamped Radio National Breakfast, broadcast each weekday from the earlier time of 5:30 a.m. with Sally Sara as host.

The new Breakfast format now included news presenter Luke Siddham Dundon, Canberra-based political correspondent Melissa Clarke and business correspondent Peter Ryan in addition to Sara. The program was changed to model BBC Radio 4's Today programme, with more serious national and international news covered, as well as live crosses to Clarke and Ryan for politics and business coverage throughout the programme.

As part of the change to the schedule, some long-running programmes were cancelled. Afternoon news magazine programme RN Drive was also axed in favour of Kelly's Radio National Hour, with host Andy Park now hosting the daily afternoon news and current affair show The World Today, previously hosted by Sara.

Economics programme The Money, hosted by Richard Aedy, was cancelled and replaced by new programme The Economy, Stupid hosted by Peter Martin. Lifestyle and design programme Blueprint for Living was discontinued, with host Jonathan Green now hosting a new weekly food programme, Every Bite.

Rural affairs news magazine programme Australia Wide (which previously aired at 6:30 p.m. weeknights) is no longer broadcast on Radio National, with Kelly's programme broadcasting during its previous time slot. Australia Wide is still broadcast on ABC Local Radio stations in regional areas outside capital cities.

Other changes to the Radio National schedule in 2025 included:

- The PM programme returning to 5 p.m. weekdays, made possible the cancellation RN Drive which previously aired from 4 p.m. to 5:30 p.m. weekdays.
- After PM, the specialist programmes that previously aired at 6 p.m. returning to their previous 5.30 p.m. slot, including Global Roaming on Mondays, Law Report on Tuesdays, Religion and Ethics Report on Wednesdays, new programs The Economy, Stupid on Thursdays and MediaLand on Fridays. Previous Friday programme Download this Show, with new host Rae Johnston (replacing Marc Fennell), now first airs at 8 p.m. each Friday night.
- Visual arts programme The Art Show (hosted by Daniel Browning) halved to 30 minutes on Wednesdays at 10 a.m. This is followed by new weekly arts news programme Arts in 30 (also hosted by Browning) at 10:30 a.m.
- A new programme focused on scientific research Lab Notes hosted by Belinda Smith
- TGIF, previously hosted by Richard Glover (and only airing on ABC Radio Sydney each Friday at 5 p.m.), also airing on Radio National (on delay) on Friday evenings at 7 p.m. with new host Charlie Pickering broadcasting from Melbourne. The show also airs on ABC Radio Melbourne live at the same time as Sydney.
- Hilary Harper (Mondays to Wednesday) and Cassie McCullagh (Thursday to Friday) broadcasting live between midday and 4 p.m. each weekday, linking programmes and podcasts as part of an effort to return Radio National to a "live, flow format", with the live-to-air host interacting with listeners' text messages and correspondence during the afternoon. This also allows Radio National to air podcasts and programmes that are shorter than 30 minutes, with Harper and McCullagh able to fill air time responding to the audience and content.

Ben Latimer, the ABC's Director of Audio told Australian marketing and media industry news website Mumbrella that the 2025 changes was ABC Radio National's reaffirming of "its role as Australia's premier audio gateway, offering audiences a window into the rich tapestry of intellectual and creative life in this country".

In May 2025, Radio National announced a new annual countdown called the Top 100 Books, similar to Triple J's Hottest 100. Each year will have a different theme, with the 2025 countdown being the Top 100 Books of the 21st Century.

==== 2026 Changes ====
In 2026, Radio National further tweaked their program schedule particularly its arts, science and global affairs programs.

Changes to the programs and schedule included:

- Radio National Breakfast returned to its previous timeslot of 6 a.m. to 9 a.m weekdays. At 5:30 a.m. on weekdays, the news podcast ABC News Daily is broadcast followed by replays of interviews from the previous night's Radio National Hour introduced by Fran Kelly.
- The 10 a.m. weekday Arts content block was refreshed with the discontinuation of The Arts Show, The Stage Show and Arts in 30. Instead the hour was restructured:
  - On Mondays to Wednesdays, Hilary Harper hosts live to introduce arts programs and then host the last 15-30 minutes of the hour with live arts interviews on films, TV shows, stage productions and cultural topics in an arts segment called Critics Corner
  - The Book Show is reduced to 40 minutes and broadcast in the first half of 10 a.m. on Mondays followed by Critics Corner. This hour is replayed on Saturday evenings at 9 p.m.
  - A new architecture and design program, Anthony Burke's By Design which runs for 40 minutes replaced The Stage Show. The show is broadcast during the first half of 10 a.m on Tuesdays followed by Critics Corner. The whole hour is replayed on Sunday mornings at 10 a.m.
  - The previous Saturday's food program Every Bite with Jonathan Green is replayed during the first half of 10 a.m. on Wednesday mornings, followed by live interviews on Critics Corner.
  - On Thursdays, The Screen Show remains unchanged from previous years, but Friday's The Bookshelf is now a replay of the previous Saturday's show. New episodes of The Bookshelf are now broadcast on Saturdays at 10 a.m. instead of Fridays.
- As a result of the 10 a.m. weekday program changes, Hilary Harper (Monday to Wednesday) and Cassie McCullagh (Thursday to Friday) now broadcast live from 10 a.m. until 3 p.m.
- Global Roaming, previously hosted by Geraldine Doogue and Hamish Macdonald expanded from weekly episodes to daily weekday episodes with Kylie Morris and Latika Bourke joining as co-hosts. The program is now broadcast at 11 a.m. weekdays and replayed at 9 p.m. on weeknights with two out of the four hosts co-hosting each episode on a rotating basis.
- A dedicated science timeslot was established at 1:30 p.m. to 2 p.m. after The World Today with episodes of:
  - The Science Show replayed on Mondays (cut down to 30 minutes for this timeslot but the original hour is still broadcast in its original Saturday 12 p.m. timeslot).
  - What the Duck?! replayed on Tuesdays
  - Science Friction replayed (seasonal series, if there are no episodes, then BBC World Service's Crowdscience is broadcast) on Wednesdays
  - All in the Mind replayed on Thursdays
  - What's That Rash? on Fridays and a new episode of Lab Notes (now hosted by Jonathan Webb) is broadcast afterwards at 1:45 p.m.
- The Science Show remains at 12 p.m. on Saturdays but added Belinda Smith to co-host with longtime host Robyn Williams.
- The Music Show moved from 10 a.m. on Saturdays and Sundays to 2 p.m. on Saturdays and Sundays.

== Description ==
Radio National broadcasts national programming in subjects that include news and current affairs, the arts, social issues, science, drama and comedy. Some programs are relayed on Radio Australia, the ABC's international broadcasting service which was transmitted on shortwave until January 2017, as well as 24-hour FM stations, local relay stations and live satellite.

All radio programs are available for live streaming over the Internet, and most (excluding drama, poetry and music) as audio-on-demand, or for download as MP3s for at least four weeks after broadcast. Some programs are available as MP3s going back to 2005, when Radio National commenced podcasting.

== Selected programs ==
Some of the following programs, listed in order of start date, are aired on both Radio National and ABC Local Radio networks.

Program name	Start date	End date	Program term (Note: Term broadcast on Radio National. Programs made have an earlier start date on other ABC Radio networks.)	Notable presenters (and years)	Notes
Boyer Lectures	1959	present	66–67 years		
PM	1969	present	56–57 years		
Correspondents Report (Note: Also see Sunday Extra.)	before 1974	c. 2019	44–45 years		
The Science Show	1975	present	50–51 years	Robyn Williams	
The Coming Out Show	1975	c.1998	22–23 years		
Radio Helicon	1981	?	unknown	Championed by Les Murray	
Ockham's Razor	1984	present	41–42 years	Robyn Williams; Tegan Taylor	
The Health Report	1985	present	40–41 years	Norman Swan and; Tegan Taylor	
Late Night Live	1988	present	37–38 years	Phillip Adams (1991–2024); David Marr (since 2024–)	
The Music Show	1991	present	34–35 years	Christopher Lawrence (1991–1994); Julie Steiner (1994); Andrew Ford (since 1995–)	
The Live Set	1986	2017	30–31 years		
The Listening Room	1988	2003	14–15 years		
Life Matters	1992	present	33–34 years		
Awaye! (Note: An Indigenous art and culture program.)	8 February 1993	present	32–33 years	Daniel Browning; Rudi Bremer (as of 2024)	
Radio Eye	1993	2009	15–16 years	Brent Clough	
Radio National Breakfast	1994	present	31–32 years	Peter Thompson (1994–2005); Fran Kelly (2005–2021); Patricia Karvelas (2022–2024); Sally Sara (since 2025–)	
Arts Today	1994	1996	1–2 years	David Marr	
Conversations	2012	present	13–14 years	Richard Fidler; Sarah Kanowski	
The National Interest	1995	2011	15–16 years	Terry Lane; Peter Mares	
Sound Quality	1995	2015	19–20 years	Tim Ritchie	
The World Today	1999	present	26–27 years		
Bush Telegraph	2001	2014	12–13 years		
Big Ideas	c. 2002	present	23–24 years	Paul Barclay (2002–2023); Natasha Mitchell (since 2023–)	
Speaking Out	1990	present	35–36 years	Larissa Behrendt	
The Night Air	2002	2013	10–11 years	Brent Clough; Tony Barrell; Diane Dean; John Jacobs	
All in the Mind	c. 2003	present	22–23 years		
Counterpoint	2004	2024	19–20 years	Michael Duffy; Paul Comrie-Thomson; Brendan O'Neill; Tom Switzer; Amanda Vanstone; anor. right-wing figures	
Future Tense	2009	present	6–7 years	Antony Funnell	
RN Drive (Note: Program covered politics, current affairs, arts, and culture.)	2012	2024	11–12 years	Waleed Aly (2012–2014); Patricia Karvelas (2015–2021); Andy Park (2022–2024)	
The Minefield (Note: Program discusses ethical dilemmas.)	April 2015	present	10–11 years	Waleed Aly and; Scott Stephens	
The Art Show (Note: Formerly The Art Hub.)	December 2017	present	8–9 years	Ed Ayres (2017–2020); Namila Benson (2010–2021); Daniel Browning (since 2021–)	
Blueprint for Living	before 2018	2024	5–6 years	Jonathan Green	
Sporty	c. 2019	2022	2–3 years	Amanda Smith	
Sunday Extra (Note: Including Background Briefing and Ockham's Razor, and apparently superseding Correspondents Report.)	2019	present	6–7 years	Julian Morrow	
Stop Everything!				Benjamin Law; Beverley Wang	
The Screen Show				Jason Di Rosso	
The Economy, Stupid	2024	present	1–2 years		
The Money					
The Economists					
The Religion and Ethics Report					
The History Listen	2017	2024	6–7 years		
Rear Vision					
ABC Rewind					

== See also ==
- Bald Hills Radiator, ABC's AM radio transmission centre in Brisbane
- List of radio stations in Australia
- Radio New Zealand National
- Timeline of Australian radio
