= List of Australian television news services =

This is a list of current Australian television news services and programs.

== Dedicated channels ==
- ABC News (2010–present)
- News24 (1996–present; Pay TV)

== National programs ==
=== Australian Broadcasting Corporation (ABC) ===
- News Breakfast
- Weekend Breakfast
- ABC News Mornings
- ABC News at Noon
- 7.30
- Insiders
- Four Corners
- Behind the News
- Catalyst
- Landline
- Offsiders
- One Plus One
- The Business
- The World

=== Special Broadcasting Service (SBS) ===
- SBS World News
- SBS World News Late
- Dateline
- Insight
- Living Black

=== Seven Network ===
- Sunrise Early News
- Sunrise
- Weekend Sunrise
- Seven’s National News At Noon
- Seven Afternoon News
- Seven News at 5

=== Nine Network ===
- Today Early News
- Today
- Weekend Today
- 9News Morning
- 9News Afternoon
- 9News First at Five
- 9News Late
- A Current Affair
- 60 Minutes

=== Network 10 ===
- 10 News: Afternoon
- 10 News: Lunchtime
- 10 Late News

== Nightly bulletins ==
=== Australian Capital Territory ===
- ABC News ACT

Regional, weeknights only

- WIN News Canberra Region

=== New South Wales ===
- ABC News New South Wales
- Seven News Sydney
- Nine News Sydney
- 10 News Sydney

Regional, weeknights only

- NBN News (local editions for Newcastle, the Central Coast, New England, the Mid North Coast, and Northern Rivers)
- Seven News (local editions for the Mid North Coast/Northern Rivers, New England, the Central West, and the Riverina)
- WIN News (local editions for Canberra, Wollongong, the Central West, and the Riverina)

=== Northern Territory ===
- ABC News Northern Territory
- Nine News Darwin

=== Queensland ===
- ABC News Queensland
- Seven News Brisbane
- Nine News Queensland
- Nine Gold Coast News (weeknights only)
- 10 News Queensland

Regional, weeknights only

- Seven News (local editions for Cairns, Townsville, Mackay, Rockhampton, Wide Bay, the Sunshine Coast, and Toowoomba)
- WIN News (local editions for Cairns, Townsville, Mackay, Rockhampton, Wide Bay, the Sunshine Coast, and Toowoomba)

=== South Australia ===
- ABC News South Australia
- Seven News Adelaide
- Nine News Adelaide
- 10 News Adelaide

=== Tasmania ===
- ABC News Tasmania
- Seven News Tasmania

Weeknights only

- WIN News Tasmania

=== Victoria ===
- ABC News Victoria
- Seven News Melbourne
- Nine News Melbourne
- 10 News Melbourne

Regional, weeknights only

- Seven News Border (local edition for Albury)
- WIN News (local editions for Western Victoria, Central Victoria, the Border & North East, and Gippsland)

=== Western Australia ===
- ABC News Western Australia
- Seven News Perth
- Nine News Perth
- 10 News Perth

Regional, weeknights only

- Seven News Regional WA

== See also ==
- List of Australian television series
