= ABC News (Australia) =

News division of the Australian Broadcasting Corporation

- Type: Division
- Industry: News media
- Founded: 1 June 1947; 79 years ago
- Headquarters: Sydney, Australia
- Area served: Worldwide
- Key people: Simon Robinson (Director of News)
- Services: Radio, television, and internet coverage
- Number of employees: 2,000+ (2026)
- Parent: Australian Broadcasting Corporation
- Website: www.abc.net.au

ABC News is the national news service of Australia's public broadcaster, the Australian Broadcasting Corporation. It provides news coverage of both local and worldwide affairs to the ABC's radio, television and online channels. Employing over 2,000 people across 58 regional bureaux, ABC News is the most complex and scrutinised news outlet in Australia.

ABC News is the only Australian outlet which provides a television bulletin in every state and territory. It also services the 24-hour ABC News Channel and the dedicated radio station ABC NewsRadio, as well as its news programs AM, The World Today, PM, and news bulletins on ABC TV, ABC Local Radio, Radio National, ABC Classic and Triple J. Its extensive online presence includes the ABC News website and mobile app, plus podcasts on the streaming app ABC Listen. The ABC News division also oversees the creation of documentary and current affairs programs like Four Corners, 7.30, Australian Story, Behind the News and Media Watch.

== History ==
The Australian Broadcasting Corporation (ABC) appointed its first journalist, P. C. Murphy, in 1934. Its first federal news editor, Frank Dixon, was appointed in 1936, and its first Canberra correspondent, Warren Denning, began broadcasting in 1939. At the time, ABC News content was reliant on Australia's newspapers.

Throughout World War II, the ABC opened its first overseas bureaus in Europe, the Middle East, Greece and the Asia-Pacific. As a government-funded news outlet, it had a remit to be editorially independent, but encountered censorship and political interference from the Department of Information, which controlled the ABC's 7 pm bulletin for several months in 1940. Weather forecasts were also banned from radio because it was believed that these may assist opposition powers in the war. At this time, Margaret Doyle was appointed the first female ABC News presenter.

In the early years of the war, the ABC's AM transmissions began reaching the Pacific. This broadcasting begins to this day under the Radio Australia name.

After years of relying on content from the newspapers of Australia, on 1 June 1947, the ABC broadcast its first ever independent news bulletin, free from intervention from government and biases from traditional media outlets.

In July 2010, the ABC launched its 24-hour news channel, ABC News Channel (originally ABC News 24).

In the 2017–18 financial year, ABC News launched its Regional Connecting Communities program, which provided funding for increased jobs in the regions, as well as more resources for local news, weather and live reporting.

On 21 August 2024, ABC News underwent a multi-platform rebranding, including an redesigned website and on-air identity.

== Leadership ==
Director of News:

- Max Uechtritz (2000 – May 2004)
- John Cameron (July 2004 – 2009)
- Kate Torney (April 2009 – September 2015)
- Gaven Morris (October 2015 – November 2021)
- Justin Stevens (April 2022 – May 2026)
- Simon Robinson (September 2026–present)

== Services ==
The ABC News division is responsible for all news-gathering and production of news output for ABC Television channels, ABC Radio stations, and for its online services. In 2018 it was estimated that online ABC news and current affairs reached about 4.8 million users in Australia each month. As of 2021, the ABC News website includes ABC Sport, ABC Health, ABC Science, ABC Arts & Culture, ABC Fact Check, ABC Environment and news in other languages.

The Australian Broadcasting Corporation Act 1983 mandates that the ABC "shall develop and maintain an independent service for the broadcasting of news and information" both within Australia on a daily basis, and also to countries outside Australia.

== Theme music ==
The first ABC News bulletins on radio were introduced with "By Land, Sea and Air", then "The British Grenadiers" was used until February 1942. After this, a shortened version of the national anthem, "Advance Australia Fair" was used.

External audio
- The Majestic Fanfare – Queen's Hall Light Orchestra, 1943, from the National Film and Sound Archive.

From the early 1950s, "Majestic Fanfare", an orchestral piece by British composer Charles Williams, introduced radio news from 31 December 1952. When ABC News began television broadcasting in 1956, the same music was used to introduce its bulletins until 1985. "Majestic Fanfare" was used in several forms on the radio—an 18-second version introduced longer radio bulletins in the 1970s, and a nine-second version was used for shorter news updates.

Australian conductor Richard Mills recomposed "Majestic Fanfare" in 1988 for Australia's bicentennial. This refreshed version, performed by the Sydney Symphony Orchestra, is still used on all ABC Radio news bulletins as of 2026, except on the national youth broadcaster Triple J, which has used a hip-hop-inspired remix of the orchestral piece, complete with an N.W.A sample, since 1991.

The theme for ABC's television bulletins has changed dramatically since "Majestic Fanfare" was dropped in 1985. Its first replacement was "Best Endeavours", written by Alan Hawkshaw, which was the theme for Channel 4 News in the United Kingdom. It was used for about a year.

External videos
- ABC News Theme (Remix) by Pendulum: live, via the National Film and Sound Archive, Live performance of the Pendulum remix from a 2011 concert.

From 1986, a theme composed by Tony Ansell and Peter Wall was introduced. It has been described as the ABC's most iconic, and was used until 2005. In 2010, it was sampled and remixed by the group Pendulum, and polled at number 11 in Triple J's Hottest 100 of 2010.

On 26 January 2005, a new piece by Martin Armiger and John Gray was introduced. It was performed by the Sydney Symphony Orchestra and boasted a more contemporary sound, while retaining references to "Majestic Fanfare". Upon introduction the ABC received almost 100 calls about the changes to its news presentation. Wall accused the theme of copying his and Ansell's composition, and complained to the ABC. This version was remixed in 2010, and then again in a 2017 brand refresh.

Talks began in 2016 to unify the ABC television and radio news themes, to create a "consistent brand across all its platforms," but this never came to fruition. In August 2024, Ansell and Wall's theme was reintroduced as the television news theme, in the form of a remaster by David McDonald from the original multi-track studio recording, including a rerecorded piccolo, and layered drum samples to add a bassier sound.

== Television ==
=== History ===
On 4 March 1985, the ABC refreshed its structure and look, when the 7 o'clock news and the following current affairs program (at that time, Nationwide) were combined to form The National, and moved to 6:30 pm until 8 December 1985. After The National was deemed unsuccessful, On 9 December 1985, the news was refreshed again with a new set, graphics, and theme.

In 1998, the set was updated, a new opener featuring a light blue globe and the ABC logo was introduced, and the theme remained the same but was tweaked. The graphics also changed to match the new look.

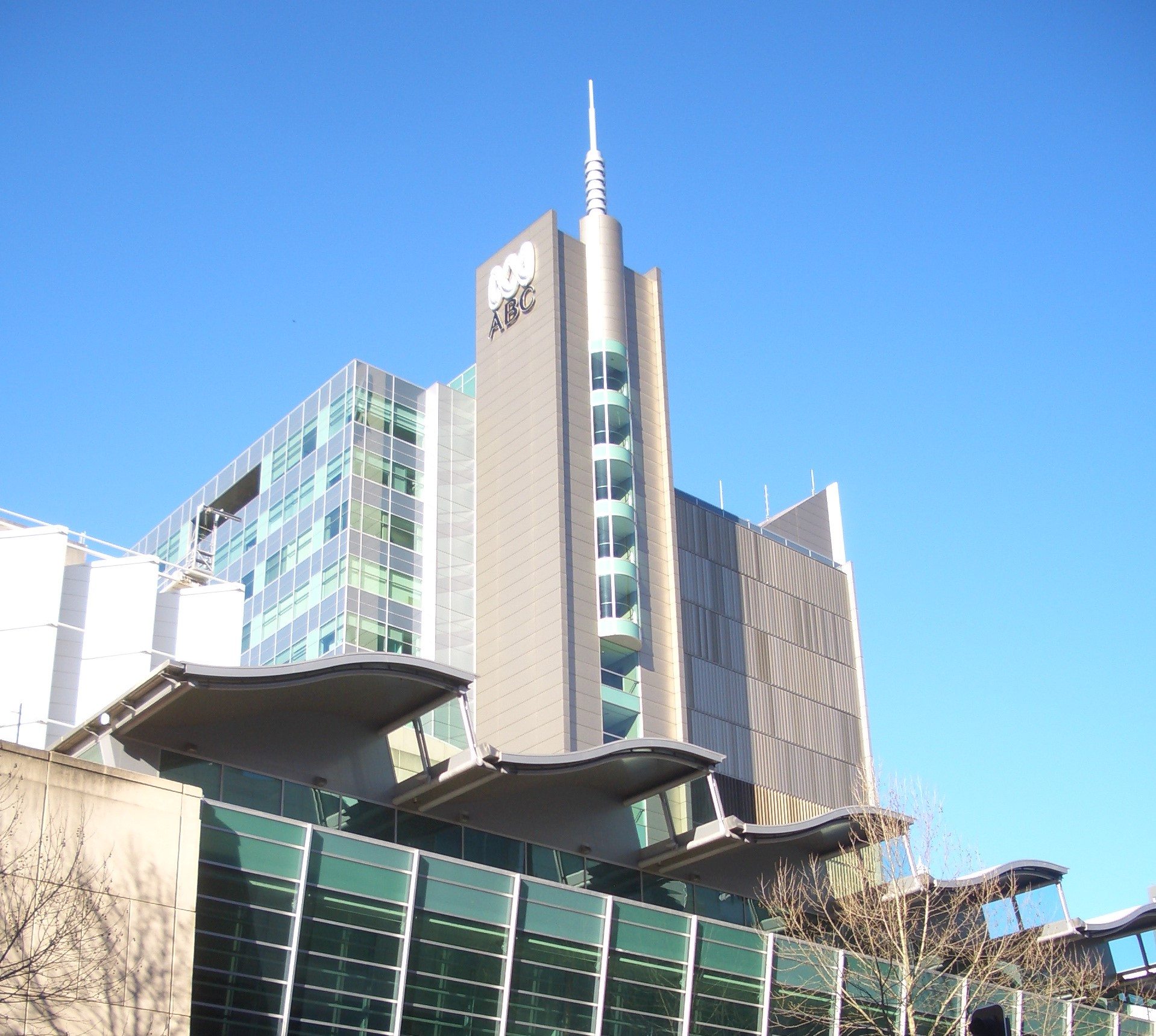
Ultimo Centre, the current head office of the service

On 26 January 2005, a new look (along with theme music) was introduced. The new look made use of an orange and blue globe motif. At the same time the set and graphics received a major overhaul to fit in with this look.

In January 2010, the ABC announced that a dedicated 24-hour digital television news channel, named ABC News 24 would be launched during the year. The new channel commenced preliminary broadcasting with a promo loop in early July 2010, with the ABC re-numbering ABC HD channel 20 to logical channel number 24. The channel was officially launched as ABC News 24 at 7:30 pm Australian Eastern Standard Time on 22 July 2010, and simulcast its first hour of transmission on ABC1.

With the launch of ABC News on 22 July 2010, all 7 pm bulletins across Australia had a graphics overhaul to match the look of the new channel. The blue/orange globe style opener was replaced with a series of sliding panels, featuring images specific to each state. New sets were built in each capital city studio to match the ABC News 24 set and graphics were changed to match.

=== National bulletins and programs ===
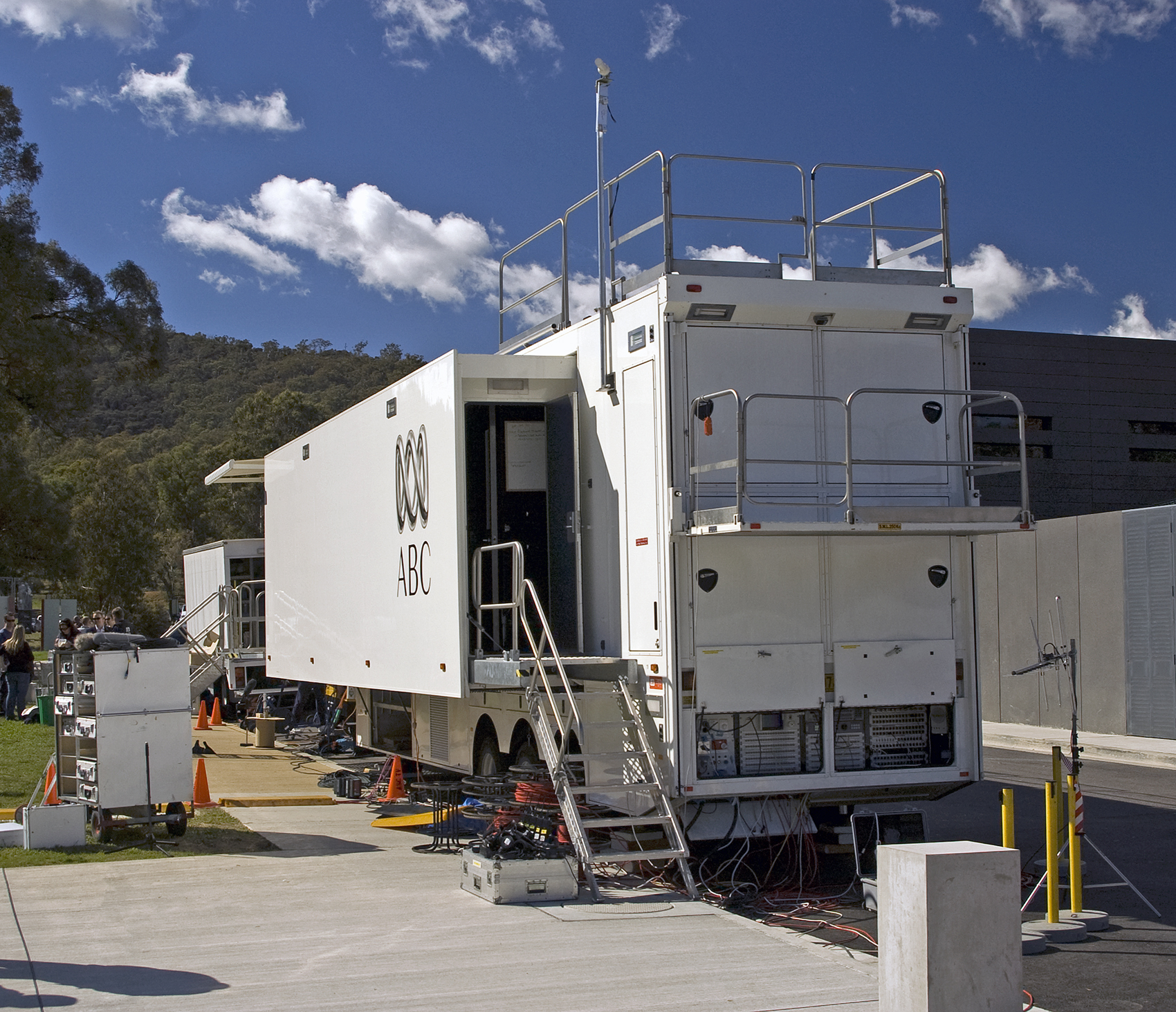
An ABC News broadcast trailer at the Australian War Memorial

National news updates are presented on ABC TV throughout the day, with evening updates at 7 pm presented live in all states and territories by the respective bureau's news presenters. ABC News is the only Australian outlet to provide a television bulletin in every state and territory, after Nine News pulled out of the Northern Territory market in 2025. Bulletins focus strongly on issues of state relevance, with a greater inclusion of national and international news items than are found in the news bulletins of commercial broadcasters. A national financial bulletin is presented on weeknights by David Chau in Sydney.

News Breakfast is broadcast on weekdays from 6–9am on ABC TV and the ABC News channel from ABC's Melbourne studio and is presented by James Glenday and Bridget Brennan, news presenter Emma Rebellato, sport presenter Catherine Murphy and weather presenter Nate Byrne. The program is also shown online and on ABC Australia in the Asia Pacific region.

Weekend Breakfast is broadcast on weekends from 7–11am on ABC TV and the ABC News channel from ABC's main national news studio in Sydney at Ultimo and is presented by Johanna Nicholson and Fauziah Ibrahim.

ABC News Mornings is presented by Gemma Veness from Monday to Wednesday and Kathryn Robinson on Thursday and Friday, (from the ABC's Parramatta Studio in Parramatta, Western Sydney) and airs weekdays at 9am on ABC TV and on the ABC News channel. Sport is presented by Catherine Murphy and weather is presented by Nate Byrne, both from the Melbourne studios.

ABC News at Noon (launched in February 2005 to replace the less successful Midday News and Business, preceded in turn by the long-running World at Noon) is presented by Ros Childs on weekdays and Melissa Mackay on weekends, from the ABC's main national news studio in the Sydney suburb of Ultimo, and airs on ABC TV and ABC News channel in each Australian state and territory at midday Australian Eastern Standard/Daylight Time. A separate edition of the bulletin is produced for Western Australia two to three hours after the original broadcast, as the time delay was deemed too long to remain up-to-date.

7.30 is presented by Sarah Ferguson from the ABC's main national news studio in Ultimo, Sydney, on ABC TV at 7:30pm, from Monday to Thursday.

ABC Late News is presented by Craig Smart or Jade Barker from Monday to Friday, broadcast from Perth on ABC TV at 10:30pm (eastern time). A separate edition is presented from Perth for Western Australia also by Craig Smart or Jade Barker on ABC at 10:30 pm (western time) and then ABC News channel at 11pm (eastern time) and 12:30 am. Later, they also host 15-minute News Overnight bulletins.

Other news and current affairs programs broadcast nationally include Afternoon Briefing, ABC News at Five, 7.30, Insiders, Four Corners, Behind the News, Q&A, Landline, Offsiders, One Plus One, The Business, The World, Australian Story, Foreign Correspondent, Media Watch and Australia Wide.

=== State bulletins ===
- ABC News ACT is presented from the ABC's Dickson studio by Greg Jennett from Sunday to Thursday and Adrienne Francis on Friday and Saturday. This bulletin is the backup program in the event the New South Wales bulletin is unable to be produced.
- ABC News New South Wales is presented from the ABC's Parramatta studio (ABN) by Jeremy Fernandez from Sunday to Thursday and Lydia Feng and Nakari Thorpe on Friday and Saturday. Sport is presented by Chloe Hart from Friday to Sunday. Weather is presented by Tom Saunders on weeknights.
- ABC News Northern Territory is presented from the ABC's Darwin studio (ABD) by Kyle Dowling from Sunday to Thursday and Isabella Tolhurst on Friday and Saturday.
- ABC News Queensland is presented from the ABC's Queensland headquarters (ABQ) on Brisbane's South Bank by Jessica van Vonderen from Monday to Thursday and Lexy Hamilton-Smith from Friday to Sunday. Weather is presented by Jenny Woodward from Sunday to Thursday.
- ABC News South Australia is presented from the ABC's Collinswood studio (ABS) by Jessica Harmsen from Monday to Thursday and Richard Davies or Candice Prosser from Friday to Sunday.
- ABC News Tasmania is presented from the ABC's Hobart studio (ABT) by Guy Stayner on weeknights and Sabra Lane on weekends.
- ABC News Victoria is presented from ABC Victoria's Southbank studio (ABV) by Tamara Oudyn from Sunday to Thursday and Iskhandar Razak on Friday and Saturday. Sport is presented by Alexia Pesce from Friday to Sunday. Weather is presented by Dr Adam Morgan from Monday to Thursday.
- ABC News Western Australia is presented from ABC WA's East Perth studio by Pamela Medlen from Monday to Thursday and Charlotte Hamlyn from Friday to Sunday.

=== ABC Australia ===
News and current affairs programs are also broadcast on ABC Australia, a channel broadcast to the region outside Australia. These include Four Corners, 7.30 and Q+A.

=== Online ===
ABC news television programs are available via the video-on-demand platform ABC iview.

== Radio ==
ABC NewsRadio is a radio station dedicated to news and current affairs. It features national news bulletins on the hour and the half-hour, with rolling news coverage during the remainder of each hour. In off-peak hours, it broadcasts content from partner providers such as the BBC World Service, NPR, and Deutsche Welle.

Radio Australia, which covers the Asia-Pacific region, broadcasts regular bulletins produced in Melbourne, featuring reports from foreign correspondents in the region.

=== National bulletins ===
- ABC Classic broadcasts state bulletins every hour from 6 am until noon and then every 2 hours on the hour.
- Non-local streams of Radio National broadcast national bulletins every hour, 24 hours a day.
- National youth radio station Triple J broadcasts its own 3-minute bulletins between 6 am and 6 pm on weekdays, and between 7 am and noon on weekends.

=== State bulletins ===
State bulletins are produced by the ABC Local Radio station from the capital city of each state and mainland territory. They are broadcast to all ABC Local Radio and Radio National stations in each state, and focus strongly on issues of state relevance, but also feature national and international stories. Most other regional bureaux of the ABC broadcast their own local bulletin at midday on weekdays. National bulletins air when state bulletins are not produced.

ABC Local Radio stations previously broadcast a flagship 15-minute state bulletin at 7:45 am, which in its final years was the only bulletin still introduced by the 18-second version of "Majestic Fanfare". All other bulletins were introduced by a 9-second version of Majestic Fanfare. ABC Radio National and ABC Classic stations did not broadcast the 7:45 am bulletin, instead broadcasting an ordinary 8 am state bulletin and a 10-minute 7 am bulletin respectively, and continued to broadcast bulletins every hour when Local Radio stations broadcast bulletins every 30 minutes in the early morning. This bulletin began in 1939 and was discontinued on Sunday 20 September 2020.

- ABC News ACT is broadcast at 5:30 am and on the hour between 6 am and 10 pm each day from the studios of ABC Radio Canberra.
- ABC News New South Wales is broadcast at 5:30 am and on the hour between 6 am and 10 pm each day from the studios of ABC Radio Sydney.
- ABC News Northern Territory is broadcast at 5:30 am and on the hour between 6 am and 10 pm each day from the studios of ABC Radio Darwin.
- ABC News Queensland is broadcast at 5:30 am and on the hour between 6 am and 7 pm on weekdays from the studios of ABC Radio Brisbane. Weekend bulletins are broadcast on the hour between 6 am and midday.
- ABC News South Australia is broadcast at 5:30 am and on the hour between 6 am and 10 pm on weekdays from the studios of ABC Radio Adelaide. Weekend bulletins are broadcast on the hour between 6 am and midday.
- ABC News Tasmania is broadcast at 5:30 am and on the hour between 6 am and 9 pm on weekdays from the studios of ABC Radio Hobart. Weekend bulletins are broadcast on the hour between 6 am and midday.
- ABC News Victoria is broadcast at 5:30 am and on the hour between 6 am and 10 pm on weekdays from the studios of ABC Radio Melbourne. Weekend bulletins are broadcast on the hour between 6 am and midday.
- ABC News Western Australia is produced by ABC Radio Perth. Weekday bulletins are broadcast every 30 minutes between 5:00 am and 7:00 am, then at 7:45 am, then at 9:00 am, then every hour until 10:00 pm. Weekend bulletins are broadcast every 30 minutes between 6:00 am and 7:00 am, then at 7:45 am, then at 9:00 am, then every hour until 1:00 pm.

=== Current affairs ===
ABC News produces several current affairs programs for radio. All share a quasi-magazine format, and investigate stories in greater depth compared to news bulletins.

- AM is broadcast in three editions – a 10-minute edition at 6:05 am on ABC Local Radio, a 20-minute edition at 7:10 am on ABC Radio National, and a flagship 30 minute edition at 8:00 am on ABC Local Radio.
- The World Today is broadcast in one edition – a 30-minute edition at 12:10 pm on ABC Local Radio and ABC Radio National.
- PM is broadcast in two editions – a 30-minute edition at 5:00 pm on ABC Radio National, and a flagship 30 minute edition at 6:30 pm on ABC Local Radio.

=== Programs ===
Other news-related, factual and current affairs programs broadcast by the various radio stations of the ABC Radio network include:

- Sunday Extra, incorporating Background Briefing and Ockham's Razor, hosted by Julian Morrow (replacing Correspondents Report),
- RN Breakfast
- Late Night Live
- Hack
- Nightlife
- Awaye!
- Country Breakfast

=== Online ===
All ABC radio stations are available via an ABC News mobile app, ABC Listen, from which podcasts are also available.

== Awards ==
ABC News reporters have been awarded hundreds of national and regional journalism awards over the years.

The ABC won four accolades at the 2024 Walkley Awards. In 2024, ABC News won various awards at the IT Journalism Awards including a Gold Lizzie for Best Title.

In the 2025 Walkley Awards, the ABC won nine awards, with Four Corners reporters Adele Ferguson and Chris Gillett winning the Golden Walkley, the ceremony's highest honour. At the 2025 Northern Territory Media Awards, the ABC won 10 of the 14 categories, with Charmayne Allison and Xavier Martin jointly named as NT Journalists of the Year. In Hobart, the 2025 Media, Entertainment and Arts Alliance (MEAA) Tasmanian Media Awards awarded the ABC in 12 of the 15 categories.

In 2026, ABC reporters won a dozen categories at the Victorian Quill Awards, plus 11 of the 20 categories at the 2026 MEAA Tasmanian Media Awards.

== Presenters ==
National

- Ros Childs
- Bridget Brennan
- David Chau
- Sarah Ferguson
- Fauziah Ibrahim
- Greg Jennett
- Johanna Nicholson
- Joe O'Brien
- James Glenday
- Leigh Sales
- David Speers
- Laura Tingle
- Jessica Randell
- Melissa Mackay
- Mariam Saab
- Emma Rebellato

ACT

- Greg Jennett
- Adrienne Francis

New South Wales

- Jeremy Fernandez
- Nakari Thorpe
- Lydia Feng
- Tom Saunders

Northern Territory

- Kyle Dowling
- Isabella Tolhurst

Queensland

- Jessica van Vonderen
- Lexy Hamilton-Smith
- Jenny Woodward

South Australia

- Jessica Harmsen
- Richard Davies
- Candice Prosser

Tasmania

- Guy Stayner
- Simon McCulloch
- Sabra Lane

Victoria

- Tamara Oudyn
- Iskhandar Razak
- Dr Adam Morgan

Western Australia

- Charlotte Hamlyn
- Pamela Medlen
- Briana Shepherd

Other

- Steve Cannane
- Barrie Cassidy
- Kerry O'Brien
- Sally Sara

Past

- Mike Bailey
- Scott Bevan
- Kathy Bowlen
- Karina Carvalho
- Mark Colvin
- Felicity Davey
- Mary Delahunty
- Quentin Dempster
- James Dibble
- Geraldine Doogue
- Jane Doyle
- Tony Eastley
- Graham Evans
- Ticky Fullerton
- Mary Gearin
- Andrew Geoghegan
- Stan Grant
- Alicia Gorey
- Hamish Macdonald
- Elysse Morgan
- Lisa Millar
- Virginia Haussegger
- Ian Henderson
- Peter Hitchener
- Peter Holland
- Jane Hutcheon
- Del Irani
- Dan Bourchier
- Caroline Jones
- Tony Jones
- Alan Kohler
- Andrew Lofthouse
- Edwin Maher
- James McHale
- Sue McIntosh
- Maxine McKew
- Jim Middleton
- Ali Moore
- Richard Morecroft
- Rebecca Morse
- Kelly Nestor
- Janice Petersen
- Angela Pippos
- Andrew Probyn
- Juanita Phillips
- Ross Symonds
- Josh Szeps
- John Taylor
- Kumi Taguchi
- Virginia Trioli
- Matt Wordsworth
- Russell Woolf
- Rod Young
