= Tony Armstrong =

Australian rules footballer and television presenter (born 1989)

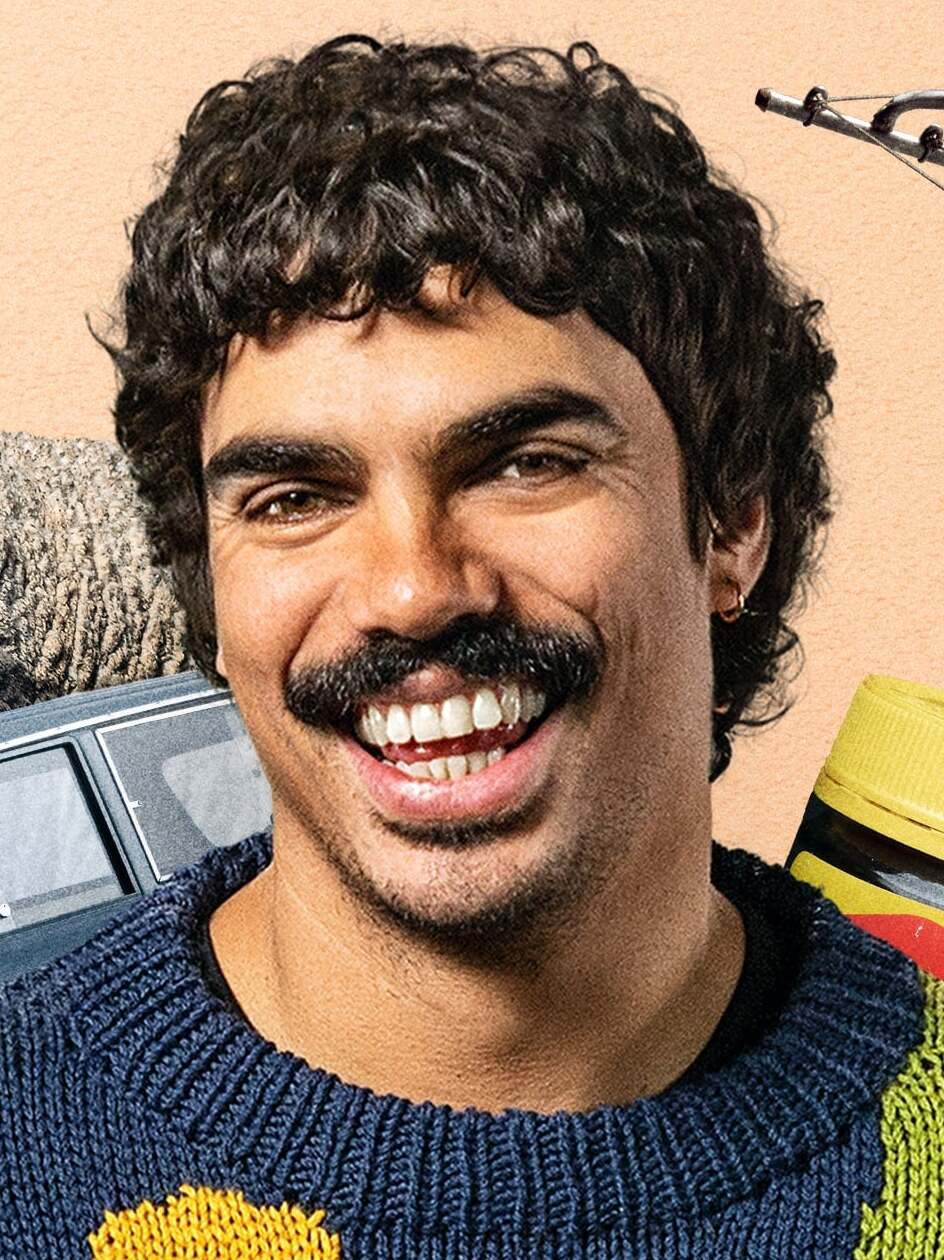
- Armstrong c. 2023

Personal information
- Full name: Tony Patrick Armstrong
- Born: 29 September 1989 (age 37); Sydney, New South Wales
- Original team: Calder Cannons (TAC Cup)
- Draft: No. 58, 2007 AFL draft, Adelaide
- Height: 185 cm (6 ft 1 in)
- Weight: 78 kg (172 lb)
- Position: Defender

Playing career^{1}
Years	Club	Games (Goals)
2008–2011	Adelaide	14 (0)
2012–2013	Sydney	15 (2)
2014–2015	Collingwood	6 (0)
Total		35 (2)
- ^{1} Playing statistics correct to the end of 2015.

Tony Patrick Armstrong (born 29 September 1989) is an Australian television presenter and former professional Australian rules footballer. He played for the Adelaide Football Club, Sydney Swans, and Collingwood Football Club in the Australian Football League, before becoming a presenter with the Australian Broadcasting Corporation. He presented the sport for News Breakfast on both ABC TV and the ABC News channel from 2021 until October 2024. Armstrong has also hosted other ABC TV shows including A Dog's World, Great Australian Stuff, and Tony Armstrong's Extra-Ordinary Things.

For his television work, Armstrong has won the Graham Kennedy Award for Most Popular New Talent at the 2022 Logies and the Bert Newton Award for Most Popular Presenter at the 2023 Logies.

== Early life and education ==
Tony Patrick Armstrong, a Barranbinya–Gamilaroi man from his father's side, was born on 29 September 1989 in Sydney and raised in Sydney’s western suburbs before moving to Brocklesby and Burrumbuttock near Albury. He was raised by single mum Margaret Anne Armstrong.

He first played junior football for local club Liverpool Eagles in Sydney’s western suburbs.

He attended Murray High School, Lavington, from 2002 until 2004 and then Assumption College, Kilmore as a boarder. While at Assumption College, he formed a close connection with the family of Brian Taylor, who he later credited for helping start his media career.

Armstrong was initially interested in rugby league, but turned to Australian rules football, supporting the Sydney Swans.

== Football career ==
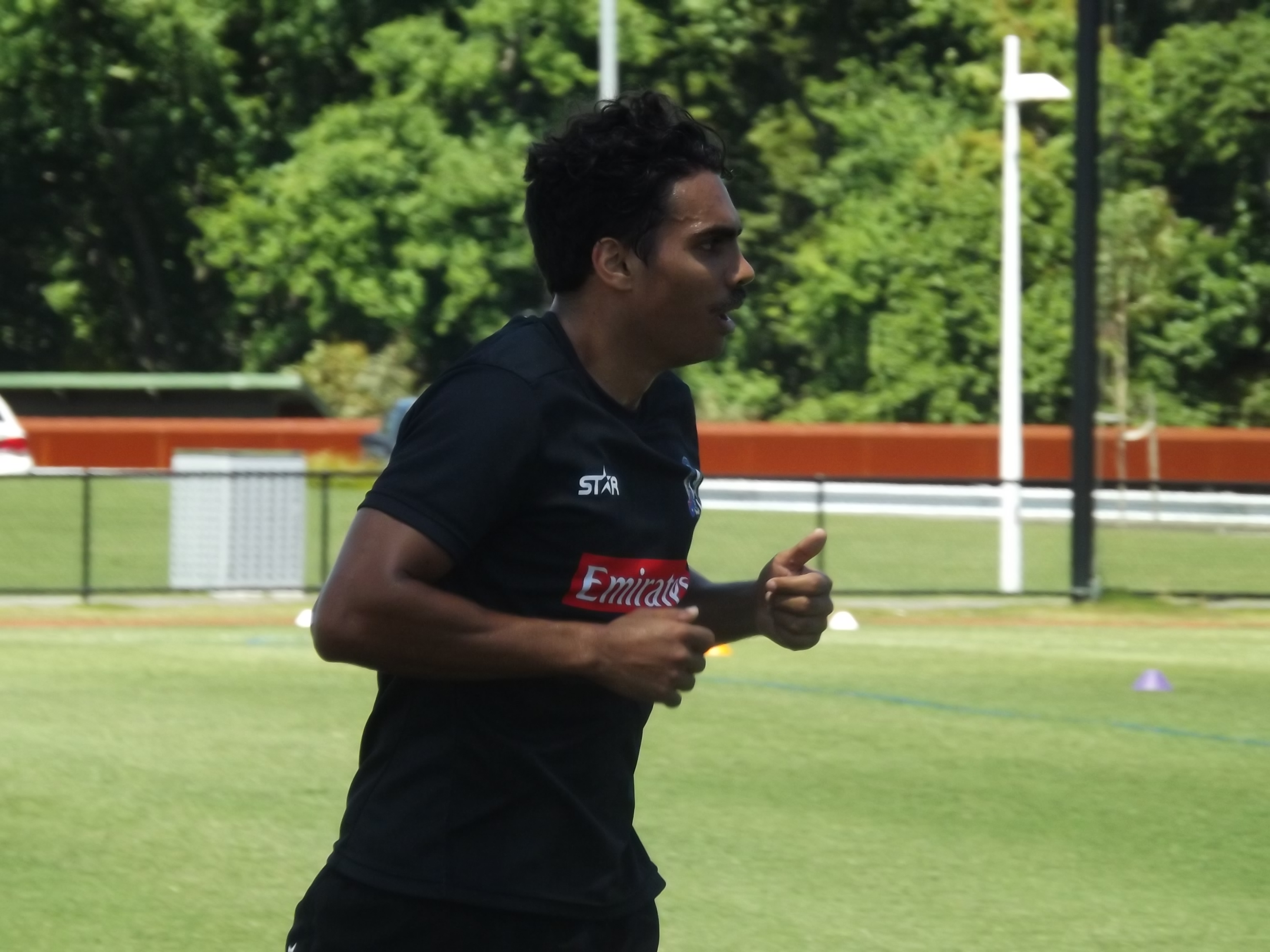
Armstrong training with Collingwood in 2014

During his career, Armstrong played for the Adelaide Football Club, Sydney Swans, and Collingwood Football Club in the Australian Football League.

Apart from school, he also played games with TAC Cup sides NSW/ACT Rams and Calder Cannons. He was drafted by Adelaide (the Crows) in the 2007 AFL draft at pick number 58.

After being drafted, he played for SANFL club North Adelaide, and after some fine performances, was rewarded by Adelaide coach Neil Craig with many emergency spots in the lineup. He was named for his AFL debut in round 13, 2009, but was quarantined along with his housemate, teammate and fellow Assumption College graduate Richard Douglas due to a swine influenza scare, and so did not take his place on the field.

Armstrong debuted in the senior side in Round 1, 2010, against Fremantle at Subiaco.

In September 2011, Armstrong walked out on the Adelaide Crows and requested a trade to the Sydney Swans, the club he supported as a child growing up in NSW. On 16 October 2011, Armstrong was granted his wish and was traded to the Swans in exchange for Lewis Johnston.

In April 2012, he made his debut for the Swans; he replaced club captain Adam Goodes, who was suspended for the match. Goodes is one of Armstrong's childhood idols.

At the end of 2013 AFL season, Armstrong was delisted by Sydney Swans and then joined Collingwood as a delisted free agent. He made his debut for Collingwood in round 19 of the 2014 AFL season.

Armstrong was delisted at the conclusion of the 2014 AFL season but was re-drafted by Collingwood in the rookie draft. At the conclusion of the 2015 season, after only playing one senior game, Armstrong was again delisted by Collingwood.

== Media career ==
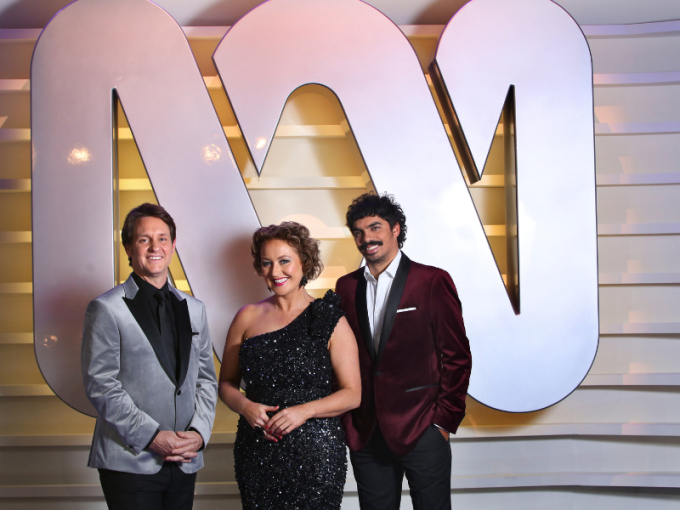
Armstrong with Craig Reucassel and Zan Rowe in 2022

In 2019, Armstrong became the first Indigenous Australian person to call live Aussie Rules on commercial radio.

In March 2020, Armstrong began hosting the show Yokayi Footy, a collaboration between NITV and the AFL. He also appeared on The Marngrook Footy Show as well as becoming a regular panellist on The Colour of Your Jumper.

In June 2020, Armstrong joined the ABC as a producer and presenter of sports news on ABC Radio, and co-hosting ABC Melbourne breakfast radio with Sammy J. He also appeared on Television, presenting sport on ABC News, commentating for Grandstand AFL on ABC Sport, and hosting the summer series of Offsiders.

In March 2021, Armstrong began filling in for Paul Kennedy on ABC Television's News Breakfast, presenting sport from Tuesday to Friday for three months while Kennedy worked on 7.30. Catherine Murphy presented sport on Monday. In July 2021, Armstrong took over as the full-time sport presenter on News Breakfast, replacing Kennedy.

In November 2021, the ABC announced that Armstrong would host A Dog's World on ABC TV, a three-part series that seeks to understand humans' relationships with dogs.

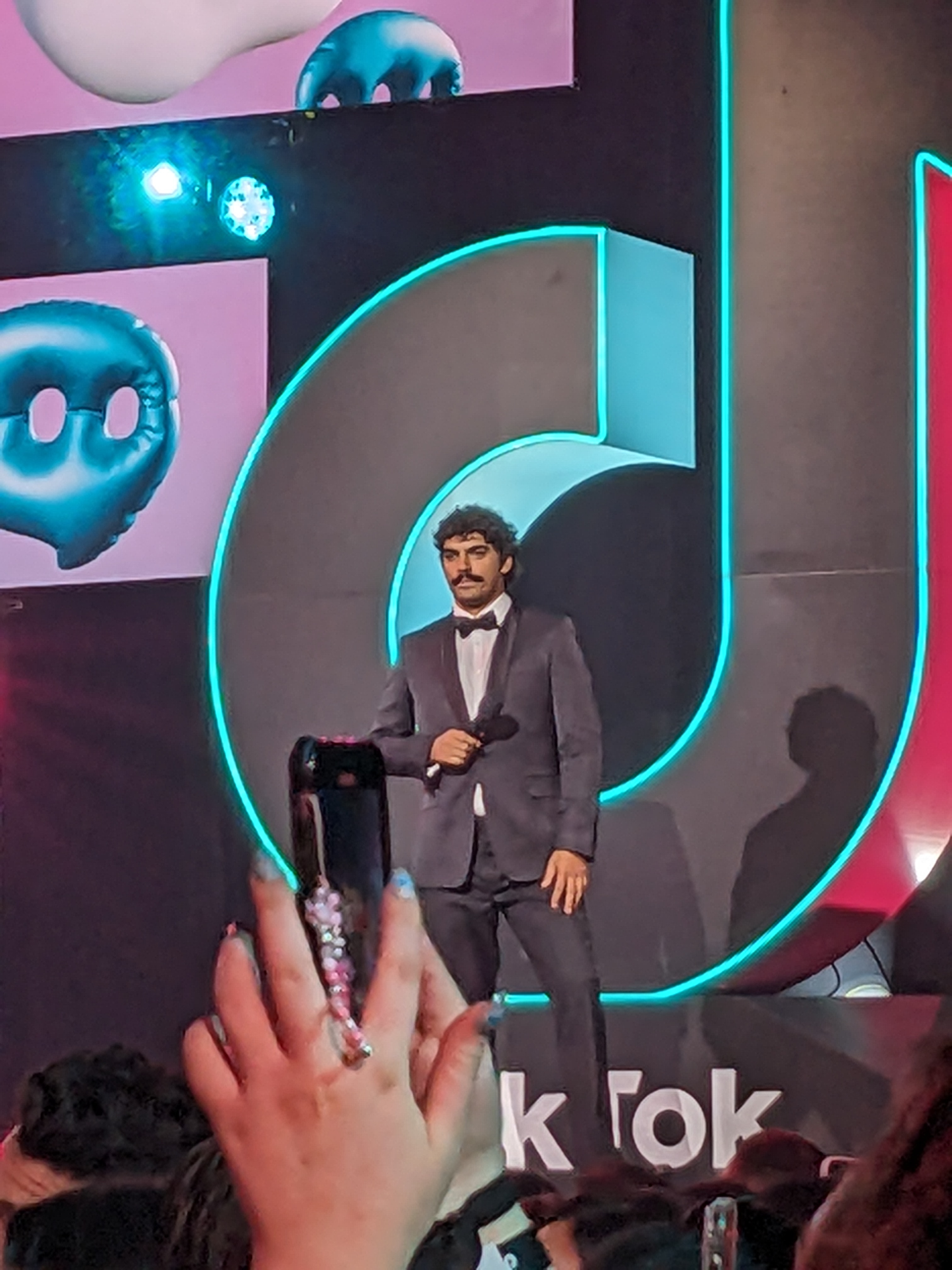
Armstrong hosting the TikTok Awards in Sydney, 2023

He hosted Great Australian Stuff in March 2023. The four-part show looks at "the surprising, strange, and sometimes dark history behind our most iconic stuff" – including Chiko Rolls, Speedos and Stubbies, Vegemite, Hills Hoist, the boomerang, the Victa lawn mower, one-day cricket, and Sherrin footballs. Guests on the program include Benjamin Law, Nazeem Hussain, Jenny Kee, Nornie Bero, Kevin Kropinyeri, Richard Glover, and Jean Kittson.

In April 2024, the ABC announced that Armstrong would host Tony Armstrong's Extra-Ordinary Things, a five-part TV series featuring objects chosen by Armstrong, which would go on show at the National Museum of Australia in June 2024.

In September 2024 Armstrong announced his retirement from News Breakfast, with his last day on 4 October. In the same month, he was criticised on ABC's Media Watch for undertaking commercial work for NRMA without approval from the ABC.

In January 2025, Armstrong began hosting Eat the Invaders, a six-part series which explores eating Australia's invasive species, airing on ABC TV.

Armstrong often appeared as a panellist on Network 10's The Project and on Fox Footy, as well as doing comedy segments on The Weekly with Charlie Pickering. He has been working on writing for television and wants to write a dark comedy.

Armstrong, along with Courtney Act, commentated on the Eurovision Song Contest 2025 for SBS, and will commentate again for the Eurovision Song Contest 2026.

In September 2025, it was announced that Shilling It, a web series starring Armstrong and created by himself and Henry Stone, would receive funding from Screen Australia.

In October 2025, Armstrong hosted a show examining racism in sport named End Game.

In January 2026, Armstrong hosted a show named Always Was Tonight which examined topics such as the Australia Day debate.

== Other activities ==
In November 2023, Armstrong was one of a number of journalists who put their names to an open letter calling for greater scrutiny in the reporting of the conflict between Israel and Hamas.

== Recognition and awards ==
In June 2022, Armstrong won the Graham Kennedy Award for Most Popular New Talent at the 2022 Logie Awards for his work on the ABC News Breakfast show.

The following year, Armstrong won the Bert Newton Award for Most Popular Presenter at the 2023 Logies.

In 2024, a photograph of Armstrong was featured on the cover of the ABC's annual report, surrounded by objects presented by him in his television programs.

== Personal life ==
Since around July 2023 and as of 2024, Armstrong is in a relationship with Rona Glynn-McDonald, daughter of filmmaker Warwick Thornton. Glynn-McDonald is the founding CEO of Common Ground, an organisation focused on reconciliation, co-founder of First Nations Futures, and a filmmaker herself.

Media offices
Preceded by Paul Kennedy	News Breakfast; Sport presenter July 2021 to 4 October 2024	Succeeded by Charles Brice
