= Del Irani =

Australian television journalist

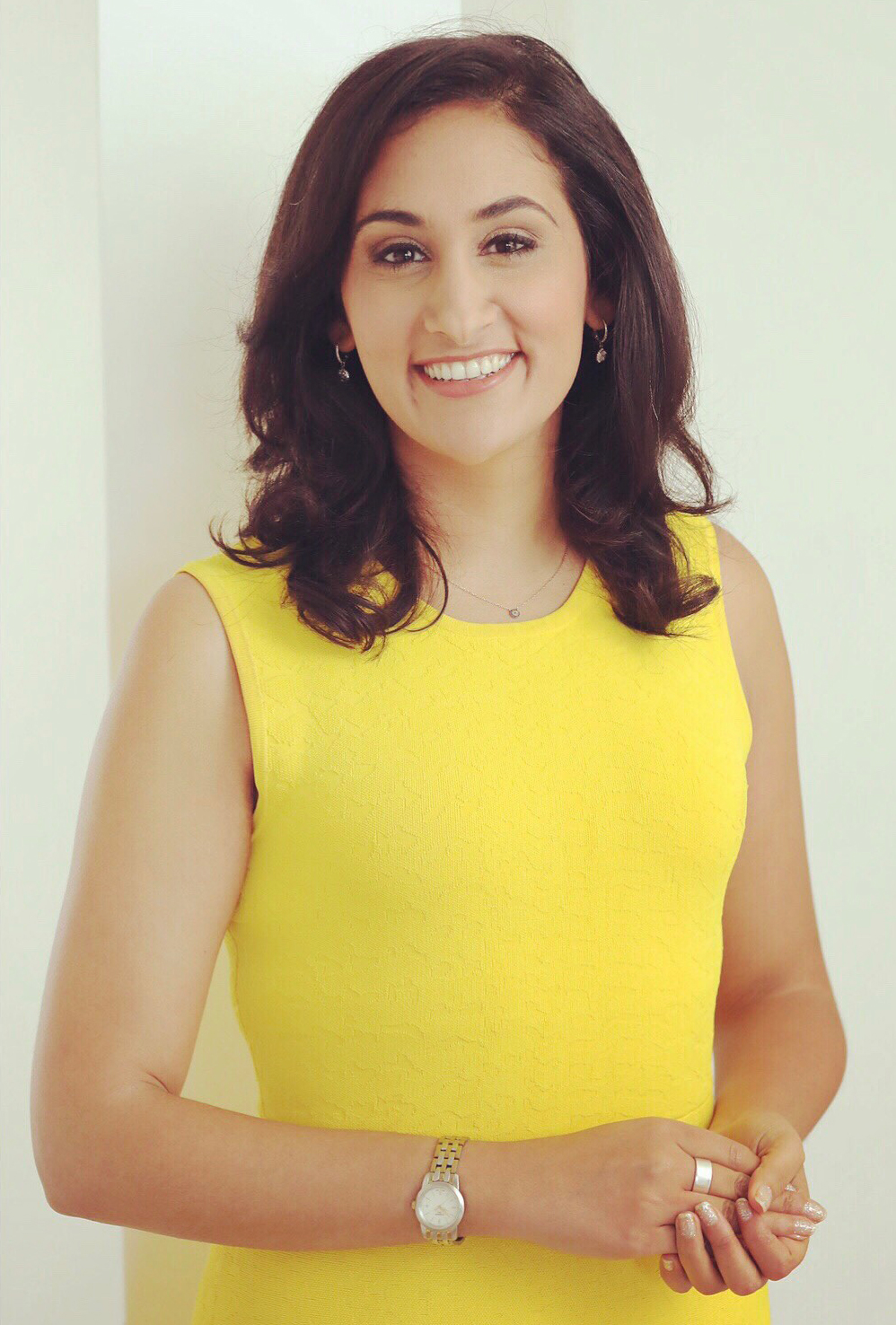
- Irani in 2018
- Born: Delnaaz Irani; Mumbai, India
- Citizenship: Australia
- Education: University of New South Wales (B.A., B.S.); University of California, Berkeley
- Occupations: Broadcast journalist; anchor; producer
- Years active: 2006–present
- Employer(s): NHK World-Japan, Australian Broadcasting Corporation
- Notable credits: Deeper Look from New York; Escape From The City; ABC News Breakfast; BBC World News; Times Now; Thomson Reuters
- Website: delirani.com

Delnaaz Irani is an Australian journalist based in the United States. She is the anchor of Deeper Look from New York on NHK World-Japan and a host on the Australian ABC lifestyle show Escape From The City.

Irani was previously a business and finance anchor on the ABC News morning show News Breakfast in Australia.

== Career ==
Del Irani began her career as field producer, working on programs for Fox News, CBS and Channel News Asia, and living in and traveling to many different countries including Bermuda, Panama, Belgium and Dubai.

=== Thomson Reuters ===
Irani was hired as a business journalist intern with Thomson Reuters in 2006, working for the 24-hour English news channel in India, Times Now.

In 2008, Irani became host of the nightly international news broadcast, Reuters World Report, where she covered Barack Obama’s 2008 U.S. presidential election win, Pervez Musharraf’s impeachment in Pakistan and the Mumbai terror attacks.

=== BBC World News ===
The following year, Irani was hired by BBC World News as a Mumbai correspondent and promoted to be anchor of India Business Report. During her time at the BBC, she was known as Delnaaz Irani and provided live coverage of breaking stories, including the trial of the lone surviving gunman in the 2008 Mumbai terrorist attacks.

=== Australian Broadcasting Corporation (ABC) ===
==== ABC News ====
In May 2012, Irani returned to Australia and joined ABC News as a reporter. In 2015, Irani was added to the ABC News Breakfast team anchored by Michael Rowland and Virginia Trioli as business and finance presenter.

==== #TalkAboutIt ====
From 2013-2016, Irani was one of the creators and the anchor of the award-winning ABC talk show #TalkAboutIt. During the course of the show, Irani interacted with people on the street to discuss issues trending on social media or in the news. She also spoke with experts and leaders on wide-ranging topics from mental health and fertility to islamophobia, radicalization and racism. Irani has interviewed high-profile Bollywood celebrities on the show, including Shahrukh Khan, Amitabh Bachchan and Vidya Balan.

In 2015, Irani and her co-producers won an Australian National Press Club’s Higher Education Media Award for a #TalkAboutIt episode on international students.

==== RMIT ABC Fact Check ====
She was appointed Fact Check Anchor for RMIT ABC Fact Check in 2017. In that role, she produced and hosted videos that determined the accuracy of claims made by public figures, including a response by Australia Federal MP Bob Katter to a question about same-sex marriage that went viral in December 2017.

==== Escape From The City ====
Del Irani is one of five hosts of the lifestyle reality TV series, Escape From The City, along with Jane Hall, Simon Marnie, Bryce Holdaway and Dean Ipaviz. Produced by Fremantle and debuting on ABC primetime in January 2019, it is an Australian adaptation of the BBC's Escape to the Country.

=== NHK World-Japan ===
After moving to the U.S., Irani became host of “Deeper Look from New York,” a weekly news program on NHK World-Japan that features in-depth interviews with experts in politics, economics and other U.S. and international topics. Premiering in April 2020, the show has included notable guests such as journalist and author Walter Isaacson and cellist Yo-Yo Ma.

== Personal life ==
Del Irani was born in Mumbai and immigrated to Australia with her family when she was 8 years old. She grew up on the Lower North Shore of Sydney, where she completed her primary and secondary education. She graduated with a Bachelor of Commerce and a Bachelor of Science in Psychology double degree from the University of New South Wales (UNSW), completing her final year at the University of California, Berkeley on a study abroad scholarship.

In October 2020, World Vision Australia appointed Irani a Goodwill Ambassador "to inform and educate people about World Vision's work and empower them to get involved."

Irani has been a regular moderator for the United Nations, hosting regional conferences for the International Labour Organization.

She is a former board member of the Western Bulldogs Football Club’s Community Foundation.
