= Kumi Taguchi (journalist) =

Australian journalist and broadcaster

- 田口久実
- Born: Taguchi Kumi 田口久実; 17 August 1975 (age 51); Melbourne, Victoria, Australia
- Occupations: Journalist, broadcaster, presenter
- Years active: 1997–present
- Notable credit(s): ABC News (2014–2020); Compass (2017–2020); Stargazing Live (2017)

Kumi Taguchi (田口久実, Taguchi Kumi; born 17 August 1975) is an Australian journalist, broadcaster and presenter.

Taguchi is currently host of Insight on SBS.

== Early life ==
Born in Melbourne, Victoria, Australia to her Japanese father, Akira Taguchi and Australian mother. Taguchi grew up in rural New South Wales learning classical violin from the age of five, and won a scholarship to study music at the University of Wollongong.

== Career ==
Returning to Australia in 2010 from Hong Kong, Taguchi worked at both the ABC and SBS before settling at the Australian Broadcasting Corporation.

In 2013, Taguchi completed a series of adventurous assignments, including reporting on the experience of running her first marathon near Uluru, reporting on the Blue Mountains bush fires and sailing on a 70-foot yacht in the Sydney to Hobart yacht race.

In 2014, she spent two weeks documenting the experience of those being treated in a hospital for those suffering from posttraumatic stress disorder. Taguchi has also been an ambassador for mental health awareness.

In 2014, she was appointed presenter of ABC News Afternoons on ABC News. Taguchi remained presenter of ABC News Afternoons until December 2017. She moved into a new role in 2018 focusing more on Compass and hosting other programs across ABC TV.

In 2015, Taguchi filled in as the host of the Drive radio show on 702 ABC Sydney. She has also backfilled as co-anchor of ABC News Breakfast with Michael Rowland, and Virginia Trioli.

In March 2017, Taguchi was appointed host of Compass, replacing Geraldine Doogue. In 2019, she became the subject of a Compass episode made in Japan, when she returned to find members of her Japanese family and advise them of the death of her Japan-born father.

In April 2017, Taguchi presented segments during Star Gazing Live hosted by Professor Brian Cox and Julia Zemiro at Australia's Siding Spring Observatory.

In January 2018, she filled in as the host of 7.30, the show that she had first worked on 20 years earlier at the start of her career. On 25 April 2018, she hosted 7.30 again. She also announced she had been signed on by Simon & Schuster to write a memoir that would be published the following year.

In October 2018, Taguchi hosted the Invictus Games opening and closing ceremonies in Sydney which were broadcast around the world. She shared the stage with the athletes and Invictus patron Prince Harry, Duke of Sussex.

For Christmas 2019, Taguchi became part of an effort to write Christmas music appropriate to Australia, resulting in a 59 minute documentary Christmas Sounds Better This Year aired and repeated in the weeks before Christmas. Five individuals and groups, Luke O'Shea (composer), Phoenix Voices of Youth (choir), The Soldiers Wife (choir and creative group), Moorambilla Voices (an indigenous singing group), and Keys of Life, were engaged to create music. Taguchi was an active part of the creative process, including rehearsing for and playing the violin for one of the resulting concerts where the music was premiered.

In November 2020, SBS announced that Taguchi would be the new host for their current affair program Insight.
