= Virginia Trioli =

Australian journalist, author, and presenter

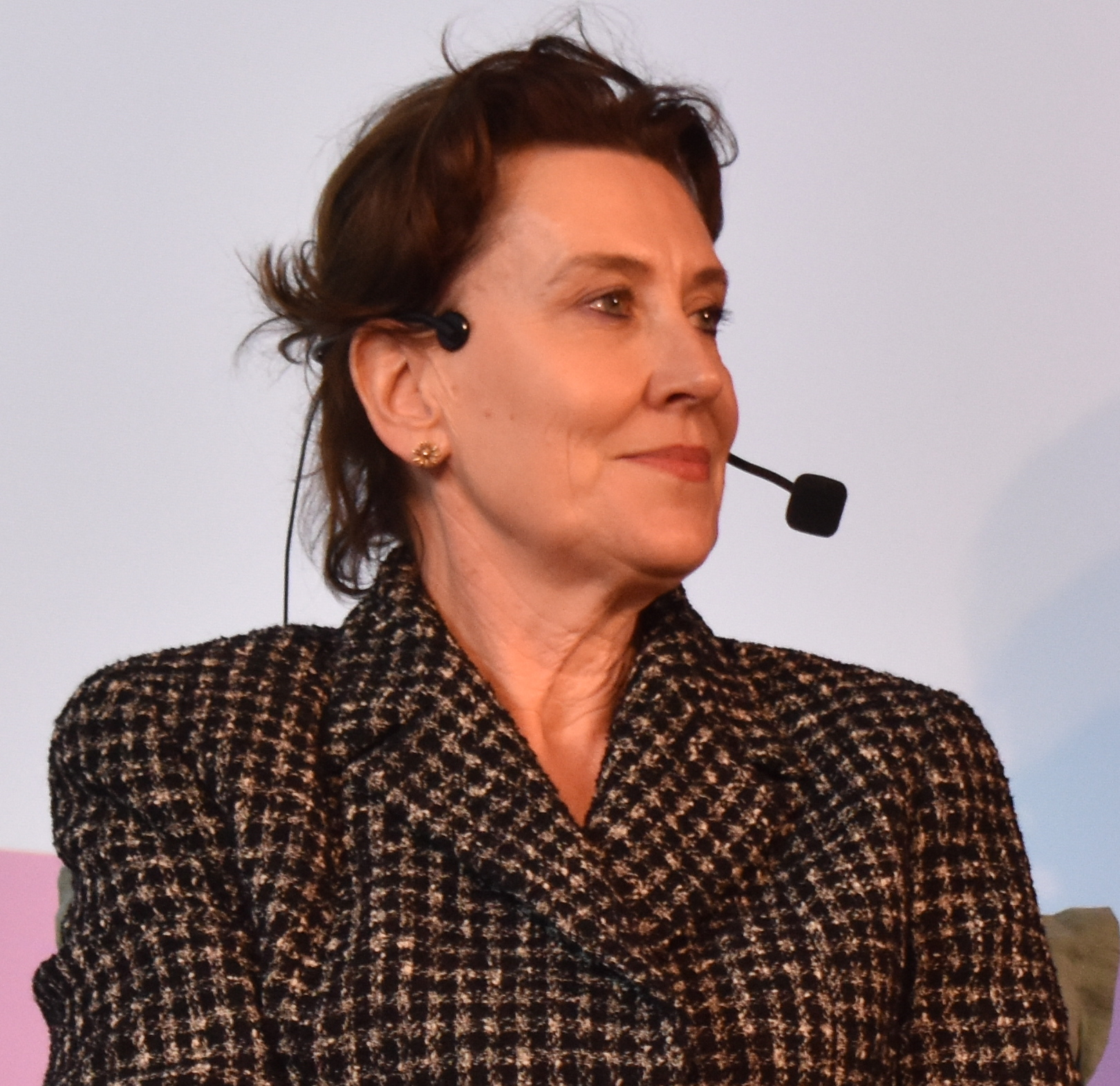
- Trioli in 2025 at Queenscliffe Literary Festival
- Born: 1964 (age 61–62); Bendigo, Victoria, Australia
- Education: B.A. (Hons); University of Melbourne and La Trobe University
- Occupations: Journalist; author; TV presenter; radio presenter
- Years active: 1990–present
- Employer: Australian Broadcasting Corporation
- Children: 1

Virginia Trioli (born 1964) is an Australian journalist, author, radio, and television presenter. She became nationally known when co-hosting News Breakfast on ABC Television for many years, and has published two books. After working for the Australian Broadcasting Corporation on both radio and television for 27 years, she left the broadcaster on 26 June 2026.

Trioli has won two Walkley Awards for journalism, as well as a Quill Award.

== Early life and education ==
Virginia Trioli was born in 1964 (Note: Some sources say 1965.) in Bendigo, Victoria, to an Italian father and Australian mother. Her father migrated to Australia during the 1930s. One of nine children, she grew up the Melbourne suburbs of Nunawading and Donvale. Her paternal grandparents ran a fruit and vegetable shop in Bendigo.

Trioli began her degree in fine arts at the University of Melbourne. In May 1983, Trioli appeared on stage at the university's Guild Theatre in Russian poet Vladimir Mayakovsky's satirical play, Mystery-Bouffe, presented by the university's Russian Theatre Group. Trioli graduated from La Trobe University with a Bachelor of Arts (Hons), after transferring in her honours year, with a fine arts major in cinema.

She undertook some postgraduate studies in New York from 1993 to 1994.

== Career ==
=== Early career ===
Trioli began her career in journalism as a cadet at The Age in 1990. In her first two years there, she wrote many theatre reviews.

In 1995 she won her first Walkley Award, for Best Business Report, for "The Bet Bardas Lost".

She then worked for The Bulletin magazine for some time.

=== ABC ===
Trioli joined the ABC in 1999, From 2001, became a radio presenter at 774 ABC Melbourne on weekday afternoons, hosting the Drive program.

In 2005, Trioli moved to Sydney to host the morning show on the radio station 702 ABC Sydney, replacing Sally Loane. She was a radio host for a total of eight years. In addition to her radio commitments during this time, she was a regular occasional commentator on the ABC TV program Insiders and was a weekly host on Sunday Arts. In February 2007, Trioli was announced as the Friday presenter of ABC's Lateline news and current affairs program, replacing Maxine McKew. She resigned from her radio role on 9 November 2007 to concentrate on developing her TV career.

In 2008, Trioli moved back to Melbourne to commence co-hosting News Breakfast on ABC TV and ABC News 24 with Barrie Cassidy from Mondays to Thursdays and Joe O'Brien on Fridays, along with sport presenter Paul Kennedy and weather presenter Vanessa O'Hanlon. The program premiered on 3 November 2008. In January 2009, the ABC announced that Joe O'Brien would host on Monday to Friday, replacing Cassidy. In May 2010, O'Brien left News Breakfast, and was replaced by Michael Rowland. During Trioli's time with the show, it rose to be ranked number two in morning TV programs.

In May 2019, the ABC announced that Trioli would be leaving News Breakfast to replace Jon Faine as Mornings presenter on ABC Radio Melbourne. On her first Mornings program with ABC Radio Melbourne, Trioli incorrectly declared herself to be the first female presenter of the program when in fact it had been Elizabeth Bond who had hosted the show in the late 1970s. Trioli apologised for the error. Ramona Koval had also hosted Mornings from 1988 to 1992.

In August 2023, Trioli announced that she would resign from ABC Radio Melbourne on 15 September 2023 and move into a TV role with the broadcaster.

In March 2024, the ABC announced Trioli's new show, Creative Types with Virginia Trioli. In the series, which was renewed for two further seasons in 2025 and 2026, she interviews Australians in the creative industries, including film director George Miller, author Trent Dalton, actor Marta Dusseldorp, singer Kate Ceberano, musician Richard Tognetti, performer Tim Minchin, musician Jimmy Barnes, and many others.

Other roles on ABC Television included hosting of Q&A and 7.30

In June 2026, Trioli announced that she would leave the ABC after 27 years to pursue new creative projects, including work on writing two books and a television script. Her move was partly inspired by some of the people she had interviewed on Creative Types. On 27 June she published her final column for the ABC, entitled " 27 things I've learned at the ABC".

=== Notable interviews ===
During her time at the ABC, she interviewed several prime ministers, including John Howard, Malcolm Turnbull, and Anthony Albanese, as well as former defence minister Peter Reith. The latter was a combative interview about the Children Overboard affair on the Drive radio program on 7 October 2001, which won her a Walkley Award for Radio Current Affairs Reporting that year.

=== Writing ===
Trioli started her career at The Age, where she worked as a columnist in the late 1990s. In April 1998 she was the recipient of the "Best Columnist" award in Melbourne Press Club's Quill Awards.

Trioli is the author of the book Generation F: Sex, Power and the Young Feminist, published in 1996 as a riposte to Helen Garner's 1995 book about two sexual assaults, called The First Stone. Trioli's book was republished in 2019 with a new foreword, relating to ideas highlighted by the MeToo movement.

From 2019, she wrote a weekly column for the ABC called Weekend Reads.

She published her second book, A Bit on the Side, in 2024, which centres around her experiences with food and cooking. Journalist Jane Rocca described it as "more memoir than cookbook", saying that it employs "food as a means of self-exploration".

== Other roles and activities ==
In the early 1980s in the lead-up to the launch of Gertrude Contemporary, an arts complex in Melbourne, Trioli worked with founding director Louise Neri. In May 2015 she was appointed chair of Gertrude (a position she left sometime before 2022).

Trioli also acts as a public speaker or MC. On 31 December 2007 she was MC of the New Year's Eve Gala Concert performed by Opera Australia and the Australian Opera and Ballet Orchestra at the Sydney Opera House. In November 2012 she hosted the World Public Relations Forum, held jointly by the International Association of Business Communicators and the Public Relations Institute of Australia in Melbourne.

In December 2019, she delivered the Human Rights Oration at the Victorian Equal Opportunity and Human Rights Commission.

== Personal life ==
In 2003 Trioli married her former boss at The Age Russell Skelton, who had three children from a prior marriage. The couple had their first child, a son, in 2012, making Trioli a first-time mother at the age of 48.

As of 2024 she was living in North Melbourne.

== Awards and honours ==
- 1995: Walkley Award for Best Business Report, for "The Bet Bardas Lost" in The Age
- 1998: Melbourne Press Club – "Best Columnist" in the Quill Awards
- 2001: Walkley Award for Radio Current Affairs Reporting, for "Minister Overboard"
- 2019: Distinguished Alumni Award, La Trobe University
- 2020: Best Radio Current Affairs Report

== Books ==
- Generation F: Sex, Power and the Young Feminist. Melbourne: Minerva. 1996. ISBN 1-86330-513-0. OCLC 36222942.
- A Bit on the Side. Macmillan. 2024. ISBN 9781761267406.

== Footnotes ==
Media offices
Preceded by Maxine McKew	Lateline; Presenter (Friday); 2007–2008	Succeeded by Leigh Sales
Preceded by Originator	News Breakfast; Co-host with Barrie Cassidy, then Michael Rowland; 3 November 2008 – 16 August 2019	Succeeded by Lisa Millar
