= ABC National Forum =

2026 Australian discussion TV program

- Genre: Talk show
- Presented by: David Speers
- Country of origin: Australia
- Original language: English
- No. of series: 1
- No. of episodes: 2

Production
- Production location: Ultimo
- Running time: 65 minutes

Original release
- Network: ABC TV
- Release: 9 March 2026 – present

Related
- Q+A; Insight

ABC National Forum is an Australian television talk program that was first broadcast on 9 March 2026. It is hosted by journalist David Speers and filmed in front of a live studio audience. It airs on an irregular schedule, only when issues arise that necessitate a national conversation.

== Background ==
ABC National Forum has been described as taking a similar format or acting as a replacement to former discussion program Q+A which was cancelled in 2025.

== Format ==
ABC National Forum will be broadcast on an irregular basis, with its future schedule being unconfirmed. The program is filmed in the ABC's Ultimo studios in Sydney. Two tables of subject-matter experts will be included in each episode. The show is to be hosted by Insiders host David Speers. The program runs for about one hour and five minutes.

At Senate Estimates, ABC managing director Hugh Marks stated that "it will be a public square, healthily pluralistic, which aims to elevate discussion on important issues affecting Australia."

== Episodes ==
The first discussion aired at 8:30 pm on 9 March 2026 and was based around Jewish identity in the aftermath of the 2025 Bondi shooting. The episode had guests including: former editor of The Age Michael Gawenda, member of the Executive Council of Australian Jewry Alex Ryvchin, executive director of the New Israel Fund Kate Rosenberg, social entrepreneur Ronni Kahn, and principal of Bialik College in Melbourne Jeremy Stowe-Linder. The first episode received a rating of 342,000 viewers upon broadcast.

The second discussion was broadcast at 8:30 pm on 14 September 2026 and is based around the topic of immigration to Australia. The broadcast of the second episode was viewed by 535,000 people.

== Reception ==
Louise Rugendyke from The Sydney Morning Herald stated that the program "was fine" and Speers "walked on eggshells for most of it", she is also sceptical of what the program adds to the ABC's broad programming agenda.
