= Lisa Millar =

Australian television presenter and journalist

Lisa Joy Millar
- Born: August 1969 (age 57); Gympie, Queensland, Australia
- Occupations: Television presenter, journalist
- Employer: Australian Broadcasting Corporation
- Television: Back Roads
- Partner: Simon Carless
- Relatives: Clarrie Millar (father)

Lisa Joy Millar (born August 1969) is an Australian television news presenter, journalist and the current host of ABC documentary series Back Roads.

Millar has previously been co-host of the ABC's breakfast program News Breakfast alongside Michael Rowland.

She has also been a foreign correspondent for ABC News based in London and Washington DC.

== Career ==
Millar began her journalism career in newspapers, with a cadetship for The Gympie Times and then Brisbane's afternoon tabloid newspaper, The Sun, until it closed down in late 1991.

She next moved north to Townsville, where she worked for the regional television broadcaster, WIN TV, for a year, after which she crossed to the ABC as its North Queensland correspondent. Millar then worked in the Federal Press Gallery in Canberra for the ABC, including during the 1996 Federal Election campaign.

She also reported for ABC Radio in Queensland, hosted the Queensland edition of Stateline and was a regular commentator on Queensland issues for 702 ABC Sydney.

In 2001, Millar was assigned as the ABC's North American correspondent, based in Washington, before returning to Australia in 2005. She was part of the team that won the 2005 Walkley Award for Investigative Journalism for the story that discovered Vivian Solon in the Philippines.

In 2007, Millar was awarded an Ochberg Fellowship by the Dart Center for Journalism and Trauma for creating a DVD to assist journalists who experience grief or trauma.

In July 2009, Millar returned to Washington to become the ABC's North American Bureau Chief and held that position for six years. In 2012, she spent several months on assignment to the ABC's Europe bureau in London, covering the 2012 Olympic Games and other major stories, before returning to the Washington bureau.

In April 2015, ABC announced that Millar would replace Philip Williams as Bureau Chief of the ABC's London bureau from September. In October 2018, Millar returned to Australia to take up a roving reporter/presenter role with the ABC.

In December 2018, Millar joined News Breakfast as co-host while Virginia Trioli was on long service leave. She filled in on the program until Trioli returned in March 2019. From August 2019, Millar became Trioli's permanent replacement as co-host of News Breakfast.

In June 2022, Millar apologised after viewers took offence at her comments during a discussion about racism in sport. While discussing Nick Kyrgios' allegations that he was subjected to racial taunts at the Stuttgart Open, Millar appeared to suggest that there would be some people who would assert that athletes such as Kyrgios should be able to ignore taunts from spectators.

Millar narrated the ABC reality television series Muster Dogs in 2022 and 2024.

In July 2024, Millar announced she will leave News Breakfast, to focus on other projects across the ABC. Her last show was on 23 August.

In June 2025, Millar was nominated for a Gold Logie Award for Most Popular Personality on Australian Television.

Millar succeeded Heather Ewart as host of ABC documentary series Back Roads in 2025. Millar has been appearing as a guest host on the programme since 2019.

=== Writing ===
Millar is the author of two books: Daring to Fly, a memoir, published by Hachette Australia in September 2021; and Muster Dogs, a companion book to the Australian reality TV show of the same name, published by HarperCollins in January 2024.

=== Twitter abuse ===
In September 2021, Millar deactivated her Twitter account due to "voluminous daily bullying, including trolling about her late father" according to ABC colleague Leigh Sales. Millar said that while Twitter remains a useful platform for breaking news, she struggled to balance that against the high level of animosity personally directed towards her on the site. She also said the barrage of abuse she received on Twitter was "very wearing". Millar is one of a number of Australian media personalities who have been victims of personal abuse directed at them on Twitter. Notably, Q+A host Hamish Macdonald also left Twitter in January 2021 due to the abuse he received on the platform, before leaving the talk program entirely in July 2021.

Despite leaving Twitter, Millar has continued to be the focus of trolls who regularly abuse and attack her on social media.

In March 2023, Millar was the subject of commentary, which she described as "obnoxious" and "foul disgusting personal abuse", relating to what she wore while co-hosting News Breakfast on 6 March 2023. The ABC also criticised The Daily Mail and news.com.au for their stories about the abuse Millar received on social media which included publishing screenshots. In a statement, the ABC said: "If Daily Mail Australia and news.com.au were genuine in their concern about such behaviour they wouldn’t amplify it by republishing the comments they describe as “vile” and “sickening”, accompanied by a screenshot. Giving anonymous social media bullies publicity on a national platform is participating in perpetuating antisocial behaviour and the very serious issue of online abuse of women."

== Personal life ==
Millar grew up in the small country town of Kilkivan in Queensland; her father was the National Party MP Clarrie Millar.

In July 2025, Millar revealed that she was in a relationship with Simon Carless, a pilot. The couple announced their engagement in February 2026.

Media offices
Preceded by Virginia Trioli	News Breakfast; Co-host with Michael Rowland; 19 August 2019 – 23 August 2024	Succeeded by Bridget Brennan
