= Simon Marnie =

Australian radio presenter

Simon Marnie is an Australian radio and television presenter.

== Career ==
=== Radio ===
Marnie was a student of the inaugural radio course at the Australian Film, Television and Radio School.

Prior to joining ABC Radio Sydney, he worked at Triple J starting in work experience before moving to a full time position.

Simon previously hosted ABC Radio Sydney's weekend morning program across New South Wales. The program was broadcast throughout Sydney on Saturdays from 6 am–12 pm and New South Wales from 10 am, and on Sundays from 10 am–12 pm in Sydney.

=== Television ===
Simon conceived and produced SBS TV's music show, nomad, produced on WOW TV and reported on ABC TV's TVTV.

Marnie is one of the hosts, along with Jane Hall, Bryce Holdaway, Del Irani and Dean Ipaviz as they guide families, couples or individuals through the trials and tribulations of their life-changing decision to escape the city, on the ABC program Escape from the City.

== Personal life ==
Marnie resides in the Sydney suburb of Maroubra with partner Amanda Brown.

== See also ==
- ABC Local Radio
- ABC Radio Sydney
