= News Breakfast =

Australian TV news programme

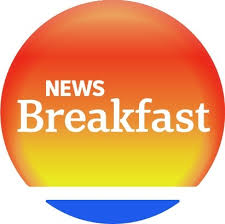
- Logo used since August 2024
- Genre: Breakfast news program
- Presented by: James Glenday; Bridget Brennan
- Theme music composer: Colin Kiddy
- Country of origin: Australia
- Original language: English

Production
- Executive producer: Tyson Shine
- Production locations: Melbourne, Victoria
- Running time: 180 minutes (3 hours)

Original release
- Network: ABC Family (2008–2011); ABC News (2010–present); ABC TV (2011–present)
- Release: 3 November 2008 – present

News Breakfast is an Australian news breakfast television program. It is broadcast on ABC TV and ABC News channel from 6:00 am to 9:00 am AEST or AEDT on weekdays and is hosted by James Glenday and Bridget Brennan. The program is also streamed live on ABC iView to anyone in Australia, and the ABC Australia channel for those in the Asia-Pacific region.

== History ==
The program commenced broadcasting on 3 November 2008 as ABC News Breakfast on ABC2, with hosts Virginia Trioli, Barrie Cassidy (Monday-Thursday) and Joe O'Brien (Friday), sport presenter Paul Kennedy and weather presenter Vanessa O'Hanlon.

In January 2009, O'Brien replaced Cassidy as a full-time co-host with Cassidy continuing to appear on the program providing political commentary.

In June 2010, Michael Rowland replaced O'Brien, who moved back to Sydney to present ABC News Mornings on ABC News 24.

In May 2011, the program moved to the ABC, with children's programming moving to ABC2 and ABC3.

In November 2011, it was announced that the ABC News Breakfast brand would expand to the weekend with Weekend Breakfast hosted by Andrew Geoghegan and Miriam Corowa.

In January 2014, ABC News Breakfast had an extensive makeover, launching a larger new and improved set with three different individual presenting areas. The set includes a news desk, a newswall presenting area and a soft set with seating. The new set kept the existing couch that has been seen on air since the show's launch.

In April 2017, following the refresh of the ABC News brand, the show rebranded to News Breakfast.

In May 2019, Trioli announced she will leave News Breakfast to replace Jon Faine as the Mornings presenter on ABC Radio Melbourne.

In June 2019, the ABC announced that Lisa Millar would succeed Virginia Trioli, commencing on 19 August. Trioli finished on the show on 16 August.

In November 2023, the ABC announced that Bridget Brennan will join the show as news presenter and co-host the show one day per week whilst Lisa Millar works on other projects.

In July 2024, Millar announced she would leave News Breakfast, to focus on other projects across the ABC. Her last show was on 23 August 2024. Bridget Brennan was then announced as Millar's replacement.

In November 2024, Rowland announced that he would leave News Breakfast after almost 15 years to focus on other parts of his career within the ABC. His last show was on 13 December 2024. In December 2024, ABC announced that former ABC News correspondent and ABC News ACT presenter James Glenday would replace Rowland from 20 January 2025.

Emma Rebellato and Catherine Murphy also joined the team in 2025 as the program’s news and sports presenters.

== Format ==
News Breakfast covers the latest news, analysis, debate, finance, sport and weather. It draws upon the resources of ABC newsrooms and radio programs across Australia and the world.

The program is broadcast live on ABC TV and ABC News channel in the states of New South Wales, Australian Capital Territory, Victoria and Tasmania all-year round. It is broadcast on a 30-minute delay in South Australia (all-year) and the Northern Territory (wintertime). On wintertime, Queensland broadcasts the program live, while Western Australia airs the program on a two-hour delay.

During summer, when only some Australian states adopt daylight saving time, Queensland receives the program on a one-hour delay, a 90-minute delay in the Northern Territory and on a three-hour delay in Western Australia. Either way, the ABC News channel broadcasts the program live across Australia from 6:00 am AEST/AEDT.

=== Weekend Breakfast ===
Weekend Breakfast is a mix of live breaking news and discussion, interviews with newsmakers and the weekend sport and weather hosted by Johanna Nicholson and Fauziah Ibrahim. The show began on 4 February 2012 and airs from 7:00 am to 11:00 am on weekend mornings (with a gap between 9:00 am and 10:00 am on Sundays for Insiders) on the ABC News channel. It is simulcast on ABC TV between 7:00 am and 9:00 am.

=== The Breakfast Couch ===
The Breakfast Couch is a highlights show which covers the best arts and entertainment chats from the previous week on News Breakfast. The show began on 12 August 2017.

== Presenters and reporters ==
=== News Breakfast ===
Presenter	Role	Tenure
James Glenday	Co-host	2025–present
Bridget Brennan	Co-host (Monday - Thursday)	2024–present
Emma Rebellato	News & Co-host (Friday)	2024–present
Catherine Murphy	Sport	2024–present
Nate Byrne	Weather	2017–present

=== Weekend Breakfast ===
Presenter	Role	Tenure
Johanna Nicholson	Co-host	2019–present
Fauziah Ibrahim	Co-host	2020–present
Jared Coote	Sport	2019–present
Daniela Intili	Sport	2019–present
Ilana Cherny	Weather	2026–present

== Fill-in presenters ==
Current presenters who have been fill-in hosts or co-hosts of News Breakfast in recent times include Emma Rebellato, Stephanie Ferrier, Stephanie March, David Speers, Catherine Murphy, Lillian Rangiah, Margaret Paul, and Olivia Caisley.

Current presenters who have been fill-in hosts or co-hosts of Weekend Breakfast in recent times include Kathryn Robinson, Thomas Oriti, Lorna Dunkley, Greg Jennett, Dan Bourchier, Nick Dole, Luke Siddham Dundon, Richard Davies and Micheal Tetlow.

Fill-in presenters for other roles:

- News: Sana Qadar
- Sport: Charles Brice, (Note: Brice, an Adelaide wheelchair athlete, announced in July 2025 his intention to handcycle from Perth to Sydney, a distance of 4,000 kilometres (2,500 mi), fund-raising for spinal injury charities.) Arianna Levy, and Tom Maddocks
- Weather: Stephanie Ferrier, Lillian Rangiah and Danny Tran

Other presenters who have stepped in to host News Breakfast over the years include a wide range of ABC journalists and broadcasters. The list spans experienced reporters, foreign correspondents, and long‑time network personalities such as Ali Moore, Ben Knight, Beverley O'Connor, Bridget Brennan, Daniel Ziffer, Del Irani, Emma Alberici, Fauziah Ibrahim, Frances Bell, Georgie Tunny, Greg Jennett, Hamish Macdonald, Iskhandar Razak, James Glenday, Jeremy Fernandez, John Barron, Karina Carvalho, Kumi Taguchi, Madeleine Morris, Mary Gearin, Melissa Clarke, Nate Byrne, Olivia Caisley, Paul Kennedy, Sara James, Tamara Oudyn, Tracee Hutchison and Zoe Daniel, all of whom have contributed to the program at various times.

== Former presenters ==
=== News Breakfast ===
Presenter	Role	Tenure
Barrie Cassidy	Co-host	2008
Joe O'Brien	Co-host	2008–2010
Virginia Trioli	Co-host	2008–2019
Lisa Millar	Co-host	2019–2024
Michael Rowland	Co-host	2010–2024
Vanessa O'Hanlon	Weather	2008–2016
Paul Kennedy	Sport	2008–2021
Del Irani	Finance	2015–2019
Madeleine Morris	Finance	2019–2023
Tony Armstrong	Sport	2021–2024

=== Weekend Breakfast ===
Presenter	Role	Tenure
Miriam Corowa	Co-host	2012–2018
Andrew Geoghegan	Co-host	2012–2019
Josh Szeps	Co-host	2019

== Regulars ==
The program features a number of regular segments and guests which appear each morning discussing the latest news and politics.

- Alice Zaslavsky – Food
- Barrie Cassidy – Politics
- Fernando Gordillo Altamirano, Linny Kimly Phuong and Sarah Arachchi - Health Check
- Katherine Tulich – Entertainment
- Sose Fuamoli and Lucy Smith – The Beat
- Zak Hepburn – Films
