= Jon Faine =

Australian former radio presenter (born 1956)

Jon Faine AM
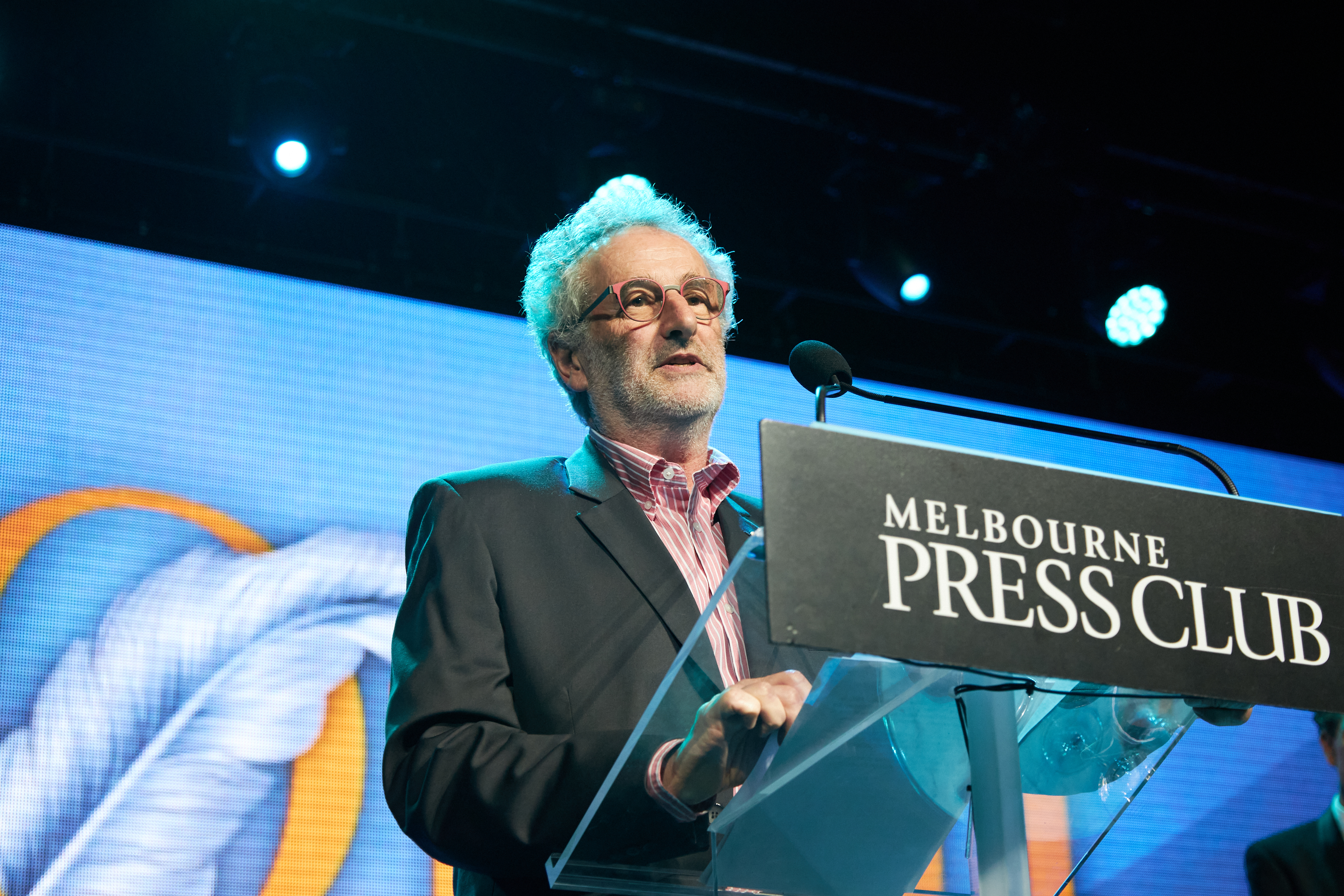
- Born: Jonathan Eric Faine; 21 September 1956 (age 70); Dunedin, New Zealand
- Presenting career
- Show: Mornings
- Station: ABC Radio Melbourne
- Time slot: 8:30 am - 11:00 am weekdays
- Show: The Conversation Hour
- Stations: ABC Radio Melbourne, ABC Victoria
- Time slot: 11:00 am - 12:00 noon weekdays
- Style: Talk
- Country: Australia
- Previous show: The Law Report

Jonathan Eric Faine AM (born 21 September 1956) is an Australian former radio presenter who hosted the morning program on ABC Radio Melbourne in Melbourne. Faine is recognised as a prominent and influential member of the Australian Jewish community.

== Early life and education ==
Faine was born in Dunedin, New Zealand. He emigrated to Sydney with his parents at a young age. Later they moved to Melbourne in 1968, where he attended Melbourne High School.

Faine graduated with a Bachelor of Arts in 1979 and a Bachelor of Laws in 1981 at Monash University, where he worked as an intern at the Springvale Legal Centre, and is promoted as a prominent alumnus on the university's website. After graduation, he began his professional career as a solicitor at the Melbourne law firms Barker Harty and Co, and Holding Redlich and Co, and then at the Fitzroy Legal Service.

== Career ==
Faine began his professional career practising as a solicitor in various Melbourne law firms, combining work with his love of cars by serving as a motoring reporter for a lawyers' magazine. He acted pro-bono for the Australian Democrats in a number of Court of Disputed Returns matters in the late 1980s with success. In 1989 he began working in radio, producing and hosting The Law Report on the Radio National channel of the Australian Broadcasting Corporation and later working on various ABC radio and television programs.

From 1996 to 2019, Faine hosted ABC's local radio morning program, from 8:30 am to 12:00 noon in Melbourne, including the Conversation Hour which was heard across Victoria from 11:00 am. He is known for vigorous debate and for fostering conversation on politics, law, arts and sport. His highest ratings peaked in September 2002 and in 2003 he received the ABC Local Radio "Broadcaster of the Year" award. He also worked on scripts for a number of television and feature films.

After a leak of ABC presenters' salaries in 2013, Faine disclosed his taxpayer-funded salary to be $300,000 per annum in 2014.

In 2011, Faine was included by Australian Jewish News in its list of the 50 most influential members of the Jewish community in Australia with strong connections to Israel.

In 2019, Faine announced his intention to leave the ABC after 23 years presenting the morning program with ABC Melbourne. In May 2019, ABC announced that Virginia Trioli would be leaving the News Breakfast television program to replace Faine.

Faine's last day of presenting was 11 October 2019. The program was broadcast from the Melbourne Town Hall in front of a live audience.

Faine currently writes a column for The Age. His book Apollo and Thelma was published by Hardie Grant in March 2022.

== Personal life ==
Together with his son Jack, who was aged 19 at the time, Faine used his long service leave in 2008 to drive overland from Melbourne to London, United Kingdom.

Faine has declared himself as an atheist and that his worldview is one of secular humanism.

== Honours ==
Faine was made a Member in the General Division of the Order of Australia (AM) on 26 January 2019.

== Political issues ==
Faine is claimed by some to be a former member of the Australian Labor Party, although he reportedly has never been a member of any political party.

=== AWU affair ===
Faine was reprimanded by the ABC for interviews that he conducted in 2013 regarding the AWU affair, in which he was found to have demonstrated bias in his handling of interviews defending Labor prime minister Julia Gillard's involvement in the AWU's slush fund scandal.

=== Abbott government ===
Faine likened the Abbott government's review of the ABC and SBS to Vladimir Putin's Russia. In a 2015 interview with Liberal prime minister Tony Abbott, Faine criticised Abbott for saying that taxpayers should not have to fund "lifestyle choices" and asked why the prime minister kept "saying stupid things" and suggested Abbott was a bully: "You yourself admit you have an aggressive streak - isn't that the core of bullying?"
