= James Glenday (journalist) =

Australian journalist and television presenter

James Glenday is an Australian journalist and television presenter.

Glenday is co-host of the ABC's breakfast program News Breakfast alongside Bridget Brennan.

== Early life and education ==
Glenday grew up in Dubbo, New South Wales, and later studied Communications and International Studies at the University of Technology Sydney. He was a resident of St Andrew's College at the University of Sydney in 2004.

== Career ==
Glenday joined the ABC in the late 2000s and has reported across television, radio and digital platforms for more than a decade. His early career included several years in the Canberra Press Gallery, where he covered federal politics for ABC TV and radio.

He later served as a foreign correspondent in Europe from 2015 to 2018 and in North America from 2018 to 2020, reporting on major political events, international crises and global affairs. His overseas reporting included coverage of Brexit, terrorist attacks in Europe, the 2018 FIFA World Cup in Russia and the Grenfell Tower fire in London.

After returning to Australia, Glenday became the weeknight presenter of ABC News ACT in Canberra. He was described as a familiar face to ACT audiences and his departure from the bulletin in late 2024 was noted by local media and ABC Canberra's social media channels.

In December 2024, the ABC announced that Glenday would replace Michael Rowland as co‑host of News Breakfast from 20 January 2025. He presents the program alongside journalist Bridget Brennan, having previously filled in on both News Breakfast and Weekend Breakfast.

== Awards ==
Glenday has received the Andrew Olle Scholarship.

== Personal life ==
Glenday lives in Melbourne with his wife and children.
