= David Speers =

Australian journalist (born 1974)

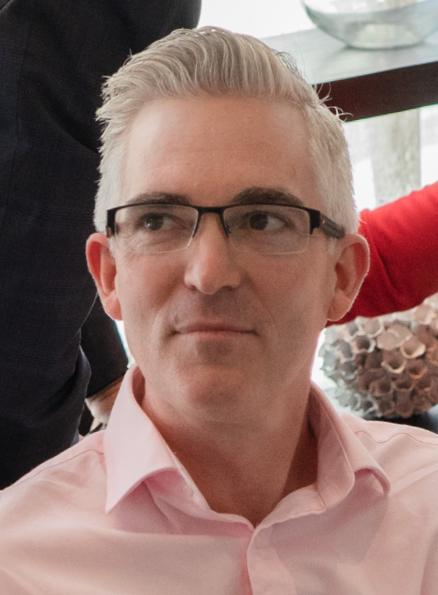
- Speers in 2021
- Born: David Gordon Speers; 9 September 1974 (age 52); Sydney, New South Wales, Australia
- Education: 1987–1988: Normanhurst Boys High School; 1989–1992: Turramurra High School; 1996: Australian Film, Television and Radio School (Commercial Radio Broadcasters Course); University of Canberra (BA)
- Occupations: Political editor, journalist, television host
- Years active: 1999–present
- Employer: Australian Broadcasting Corporation
- Known for: Political reporting
- Spouse: Liz
- Children: 2

David Gordon Speers (born 9 September 1974) is an Australian journalist and host of Insiders on ABC TV.

He was previously a political editor at Sky News, as well as host of PM Agenda, The Last Word and Speers Tonight.

== Career ==
Speers began his career in Geelong, Victoria, in the newsroom of radio station K-Rock. He then worked at 2GB, 2UE and 3AW. He has been a member of the National Press Club board since 2005 and is currently a director.

=== Sky News ===
In 2000, Speers joined Sky News as a political editor.

During his time with Sky News, Speers hosted the channel's flagship PM Agenda program on Monday to Thursday afternoons. Additionally, he presented political updates and conducted interviews throughout the day on the 24-hour news channel.

Speers also previously commuted from his home in Canberra once a week to Sky News' primary studios in Sydney to host primetime program The Nation with David Speers before the program ended in 2015. On 28 January 2016, Speers began hosting a new weekly Sky News format Speers Tonight from Canberra.

=== ABC ===
In June 2019, Speers was appointed as host of the ABC's Insiders program, replacing Barrie Cassidy from February 2020. Speers regularly appears on ABC News, News Breakfast and ABC Local Radio including Mornings on ABC Radio Melbourne.

Speers was also a fill-in presenter for Michael Rowland on News Breakfast.

In July 2023, Speers was appointed as ABC national political lead, a new position, following the departure of former political editor Andrew Probyn.

In 2024 Speers moved his family back to Canberra, from where he now presents Insiders.

Speers hosted ABC National Forum, a live panel show on 9 March 2026.

==== Election coverage ====
Speers was chosen to moderate the leaders' debate between John Howard and Kevin Rudd for the 2007 Australian federal election and again in the 2010 Australian federal election between Julia Gillard and Tony Abbott, as well as the 2013 Australian federal election between Rudd and Abbott. He also was the co-host of the ABC's coverage of the Voice Referendum in 2023 alongside Bridget Brennan. Speers hosted the second leaders' debate on the ABC for the 2025 federal election. Speers also served as the co-host of the ABC's 2025 election night coverage alongside Sarah Ferguson.

=== Other ===
In 2020, Speers released the book On Mutiny (ISBN 9780733644146) which covered the removal of Malcolm Turnbull as prime minister.

Speers has also written regular articles for financial website Switzer.

== Awards ==
Between 2006 and 2015, Speers has been awarded with an ASTRA Award for "outstanding performance" by a presenter or journalist every year with the exception of 2010. The awards were discontinued after 2015.

Speers won a Walkley Award in December 2014 for a notable interview with Attorney General George Brandis, in which Brandis struggled to explain what metadata was despite being the minister in charge of proposed new laws surrounding the storage and police access of metadata. Speers won the same award at the 2015 event (which Speers also hosted) for his notable "The Fixer" interview with Christopher Pyne on PM Agenda.

In 2016, Speers was named one of the 50 most powerful people in Australian television by News Corp Australia.

Speers won the Subscription Television Award for Best Male Presenter at the 2017 AACTA Awards.

== Personal life ==
Speers' parents are Peter Speers and Robyn (née Cowled). He lives in Canberra and is married to Liz, with whom he has two children who were born in 2010 and 2014.

Speers plays the trumpet and demonstrated this ability while hosting the 2010 ASTRA Awards.
