= Jenny Brockie =

Australian journalist and documentary filmmaker

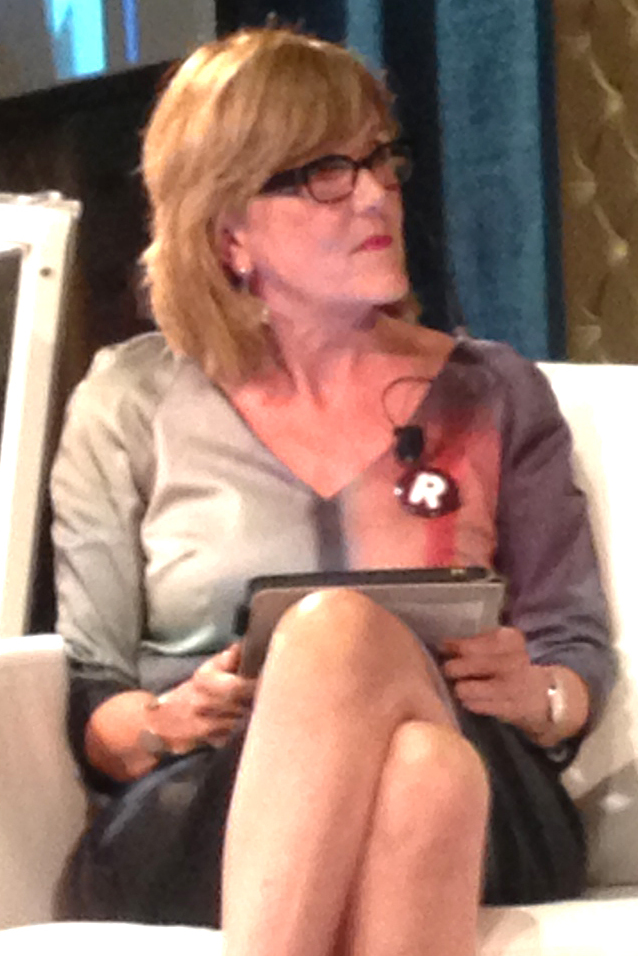
- Brockie in 2014
- Born: 1954 or 1955
- Education: Macquarie University
- Occupation: Journalist
- Website: twitter.com/JenBrockie

Jenny Brockie (born 1954 or 1955) is an Australian journalist and documentary-maker, she has previously hosted the SBS program, Insight.

Brockie has spent more than 20 years in broadcasting, reporting nationally and internationally for ABC current affairs programs including Four Corners and Nationwide.

== Early life ==
Brockie was born in Castle Hill, New South Wales, an only child. Brockie's father died when she was four years old.

== Career ==
Brockie started as a Cadet Journalist with the ABC in the early 1970's and began her broadcasting career with ABC television and radio news. She presented the morning radio show on 702 ABC Sydney as well as her own interview series for Speaking Personally for ABC TV.

Her feature-length television documentaries have won various awards. Her film Cop It Sweet about Sydney's Redfern police won the coveted 1992 Gold Walkley, a 1992 AFI Award for Best Television Documentary, a Logie Award, a Human Rights Award and the NSW Law Society Award.

In 2001, Brockie was appointed host of the current affairs show Insight on SBS TV.

In October 2020, Brockie announced her resignation from Insight, after hosting the show for two decades.

== Awards and honours ==
In 2008, Brockie received a United Nations Association of Australia Media Peace Award for her work on Insight.
