= Barrie Cassidy =

Australian political journalist

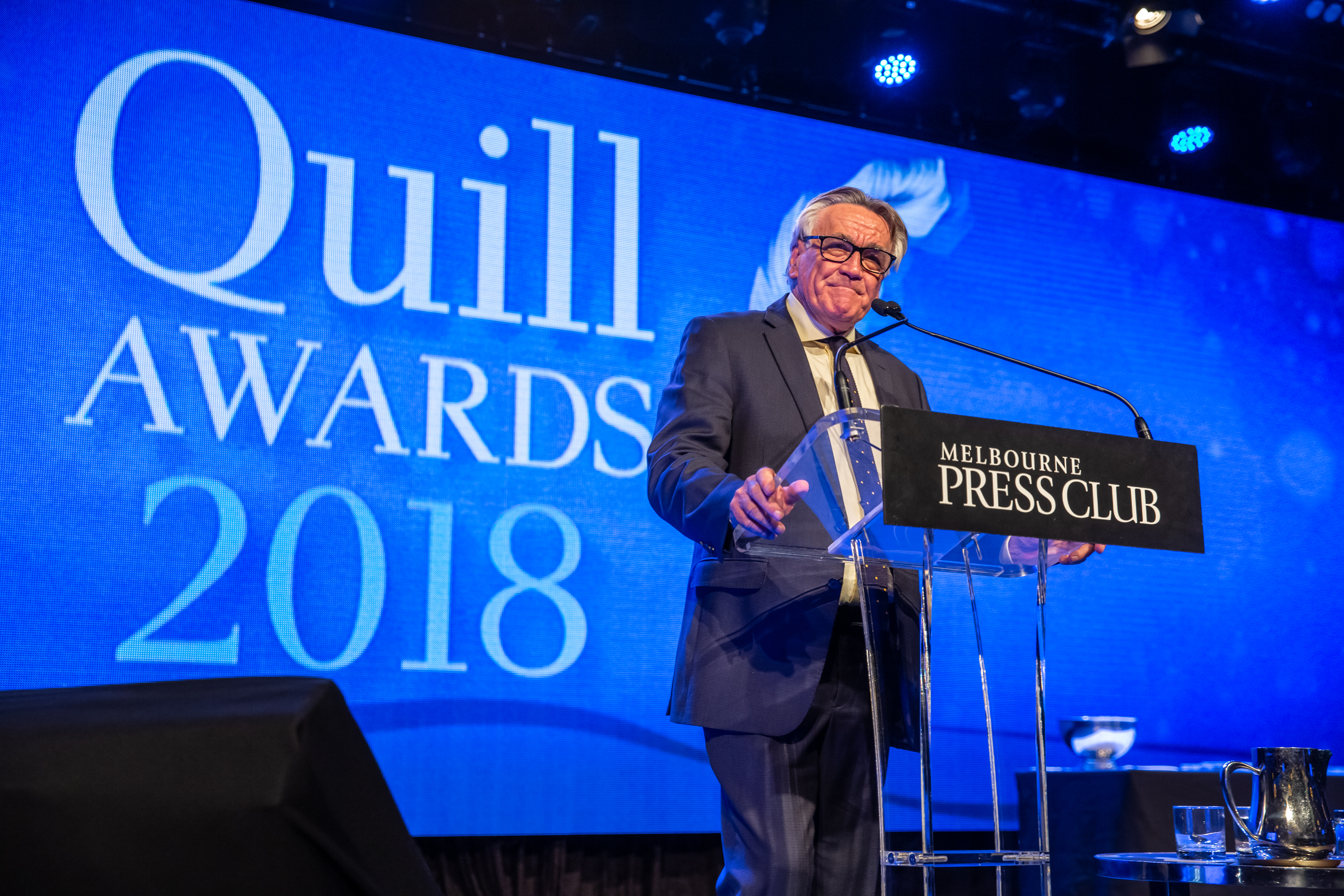
- Cassidy accepts Melbourne Press Club Lifetime Achievement Award.
- Born: 4 March 1950 (age 76); Wangaratta, Victoria, Australia
- Occupation: Journalist
- Years active: 1969–2019, 2020–present
- Employer: Australian Broadcasting Corporation
- Known for: Political journalist; television host; radio host; commentator
- Spouse: Heather Ewart
- Children: 2
- Website: https://twitter.com/barriecassidy

Barrie Cassidy (born 4 March 1950) is an Australian political journalist as well as a radio and television host and presenter and commentator for the Australian Broadcasting Corporation. He was the long-running host of the Sunday morning political commentary program Insiders from 2001 to 2019, and in 2020 took over as the host of the long-form interview program One Plus One.

== Life and career ==
Cassidy was born in Wangaratta, Victoria, on 4 March 1950, and grew up in the Victorian town of Chiltern, attending Rutherglen High School. He had four brothers and an elder sister and grew up with a love of football and sports.

Starting his career as a cadet on the Albury Border Morning Mail in 1969, he moved to the Shepparton News about a year later before being hired as a court reporter for the Melbourne Herald. Joining the Australian Broadcasting Corporation, he initially covered state politics. He moved to Canberra to become the ABC's federal political correspondent for radio and television in 1979.

In 1986, Cassidy was approached by the then prime minister, Bob Hawke, to become his personal press secretary. He remained in the job—which he has described as "the most rewarding and interesting period of my life"—until Paul Keating took over the leadership in 1991 following a challenge.

Cassidy moved to Washington, D.C., in 1991, to be with his girlfriend, Heather Ewart, who had been posted there as the North America correspondent for the Australian Broadcasting Commission. New Idea magazine had an article titled, "Bob Hawke's Minder Quits for Love". Cassidy worked as a correspondent for The Australian before returning to Australia to host the Last Shout and Meet the Press programs on Network Ten. He returned to the ABC to replace Paul Lyneham as host on The 7.30 Report, before he and his wife, Heather Ewart, were sent to Brussels as European correspondents, sharing the job.

In 2010, Cassidy wrote The Party Thieves: The Real Story of the 2010 Election (Melbourne University Press, October 2010, ISBN 978-0-522-85780-1), which one reviewer called "the standard text on precisely what happened in 2010".

Cassidy hosted the Sunday morning political discussion show Insiders from its inception in 2001 until his retirement in 2019. He formerly hosted the sports panel show Offsiders, but he stepped down from this role to write The Party Thieves, and at the end of the 2013 season left the program entirely.

In November 2008, ABC announced that Cassidy would co-host ABC News Breakfast alongside Virginia Trioli from Monday to Thursday. He was replaced by Joe O'Brien in January 2009.

Cassidy appeared as himself in the first episode of the 1998 Australia television series The Games. He has a keen interest in horse racing, and is a devout fan of Collingwood in the Australian Football League. He is also a keen jogger, running almost every day.

Cassidy was awarded a Lifetime Achievement Award at the 2018 Quill Awards presented by the Melbourne Press Club on 15 March 2019. In accepting the award, he announced his intention to retire from Insiders on 9 June, after the Australian federal election.

In 2020, the ABC announced that he was going to take over as the host of the long-form interview program One Plus One, with a special series focusing on leadership.

== Political views ==
Cassidy worked as Labor prime minister Bob Hawke's press secretary from 1986 to 1991. In 2015, he welcomed the replacement of Tony Abbott as prime minister and leader of the Liberal Party by the less conservative Malcolm Turnbull. After a speech in which former prime minister Abbott urged caution on asylum seeker policy to European leaders, Cassidy described Abbott's creed as "a fundamental rejection of negotiation and compromise, and a refusal to allow compassion to get in the way of a nation's self-interest."

Cassidy described the arrival of Turnbull in office as "a new and positive era". He described Abbott's subsequent policy disagreements with Turnbull as "vindictive". In June 2017, Cassidy blamed the Turnbull government's poor performance in the polls on Tony Abbott and his supporters, telling Insiders Extra: "The Liberal Party is in a world of pain right now, and it's not Pyne's fault, and it's not Turnbull's either. It's the fault of an ideologically obsessed, uncompromising and destructive conservative right wing ... Tony Abbott is running amok." When conservative Peter Dutton challenged Turnbull in August 2018, Cassidy denounced the move and supported the candidature of Julie Bishop over the more conservative Dutton and Scott Morrison once Turnbull had resigned.

Cassidy advocated against the election of Donald Trump as the Republican candidate in the 2016 United States presidential election and dismissed his chances of election. When US voters went to the polls, Cassidy tweeted: "Trump cannot win. The nightmare is over."

Following the acquittal of Cardinal George Pell by the High Court of Australia in 2020, Cassidy tweeted: "The High Court has found there was not enough evidence to convict. It did not find him innocent. You are then entitled to maintain your view and you are under no obligation to apologise for holding those views."

Media offices
Program started	ABC News Breakfast; Co-host with Virginia Trioli; 2008–2009	Succeeded by Joe O'Brien
Program started	Insiders; Host; 2001–2019	Succeeded by David Speers
Program started	Offsiders; Host; 2005–2013	Succeeded by Gerard Whateley
Preceded by Jane Hutcheon	One Plus One; Host; 2020-present	Incumbent
