= Paul Kennedy (Australian journalist) =

Australian journalist and television presenter

Paul Kennedy (born 13 August 1975) is an Australian journalist, television presenter, author and former Australian rules footballer.

== Media career ==
Kennedy's journalism career began in 1994 when he worked as a copy boy for The Herald and Weekly Times, before moving on to become a news reporter for Network Ten and the Nine Network.

Paul is best known for being a sports presenter on ABC Television's long-running breakfast program News Breakfast, having been with the program since its inception in 2008 until 2021.

== Australian rules football ==
Kennedy has been actively involved in Australian rules football having played with the Dandenong Stingrays in the TAC Cup, Frankston Dolphins in Victoria's VFL and with Fitzroy Lions reserve grade in the AFL.

Kennedy has also played with the Morningside and Mount Gravatt Football Clubs in the QAFL and was as a player-coach at Seaford Football Club.

His time at Seaford inspired Kennedy to write and direct a short film called Drug Game, which explored drug-related issues that players and club officials had been faced with. The film was a finalist at the Melbourne International Film Festival, and Kennedy has since been credited with helping rebuild Seaford as a formidable club by creating a family friendly atmosphere at the club when he took over as senior coach in 2003.

Kennedy has also been a coach at Sandringham Football Club and with the Mornington Peninsula Nepean Football League. He now coaches Carrum Lions and his son Gus Kennedy

At the Frankston Football Club's’ 2020 season launch, President Peter Geddes announced that Kennedy and Sharni Layton had been appointed as the club’s No. 1 ticket holders.

== Books ==
In 2010, Kennedy co-authored Hell on the Way to Heaven with Chrissie Foster which investigated cover-ups by the Catholic Church of child sexual abuse, following the abuse of Anthony and Chrissie Foster's two daughters by a Catholic priest. In 2017, Kennedy said co-writing Hell on the Way to Heaven was his career highlight, as he considers the book to be the most important piece of journalism that he has undertaken in his career and was not expecting to do anything of more importance.

Kennedy wrote High Stakes: The Rise of the Waterhouse Dynasty in 2014, which explored the story of the Waterhouse family, who are widely regarded as Australia's best known horse racing family.

In 2016, Kennedy wrote Fifteen Young Men: Australia's Untold Football Tragedy, which detailed the deaths of 15 men, including 14 local footballers, who were killed during a storm in 1892 when their boat capsized off Mornington Peninsula while returning from Mordialloc.

In 2021, he released Funkytown an autobiography covering his teenage years, and detailing his Australian Rules football ambitions.

Media offices
Preceded by Originator	News Breakfast; Sport presenter November 2008 – July 2021	Succeeded by Tony Armstrong
