= Vanessa O'Hanlon =

Australian television presenter

Vanessa O'Hanlon is an Australian television presenter.

O'Hanlon has previously been presented Nine News across Australian Capital Territory and southern regions of New South Wales and presented the weather on ABC Television's national breakfast program News Breakfast from 2008 until 2016.

== Early life ==
O'Hanlon is the eldest of five children and grew up in Melton, Victoria. O'Hanlon listed Jana Wendt as a presenter that inspired her during her childhood.

== Career ==
O'Hanlon studied a Bachelor of Arts at Deakin University, majoring in psychology and public relations.

=== Radio ===
After studying a radio course jointly offered by Swinburne University and the Australian Film, Television and Radio School O'Hanlon took up a position as a drive announcer at Sun 969 in Alice Springs before moving onto another radio station in Shepparton, Victoria. She then became a music director at a radio station in Darwin, Northern Territory.

O'Hanlon then moved back to Melbourne where she became a traffic reporter for the Australian Traffic Network delivering traffic reports for Sunrise, Ten News First, 3AW and Fox FM. She also hosted a night radio show on Mix 101.1 called Melbourne After Dark.

=== ABC ===
In November 2008, O'Hanlon became the inaugural weather presenter on the ABC News Breakfast program. O'Hanlon remained in the role for eight years and announced her departure from ABC News Breakfast on 2 November 2016. Nate Byrne was later announced as O'Hanlon's replacement.

=== Nine Network ===
In November 2016, the Nine Network announced that O'Hanlon and experienced news presenters Jo Hall and Samantha Heathwood were the three presenters they had chosen to anchor its new regional news service, that it planned to launch in 2017 throughout the Australian Capital Territory, southern New South Wales, Victoria and Queensland. O'Hanlon was drawn to the project as the new service reached into regions that hadn't had local news for a considerable amount of time.

In March 2020, the Nine Network suspended regional bulletins due to the COVID-19 pandemic. As a result, O'Hanlon was redeployed to reporting duties featuring on Nine's Late News. The regional bulletin returned in August and O'Hanlon was replaced by Natassia Soper.

O’Hanlon regularly appeared on Today and the Chat Room segment on the national afternoon bulletin, Nine News Now. She was also a fill in news presenter on Weekend Today.

In September 2020, O'Hanlon announced that she had taken a redundancy from the Nine Network.
