= Michael Rowland (journalist) =

Australian journalist (born 1968)

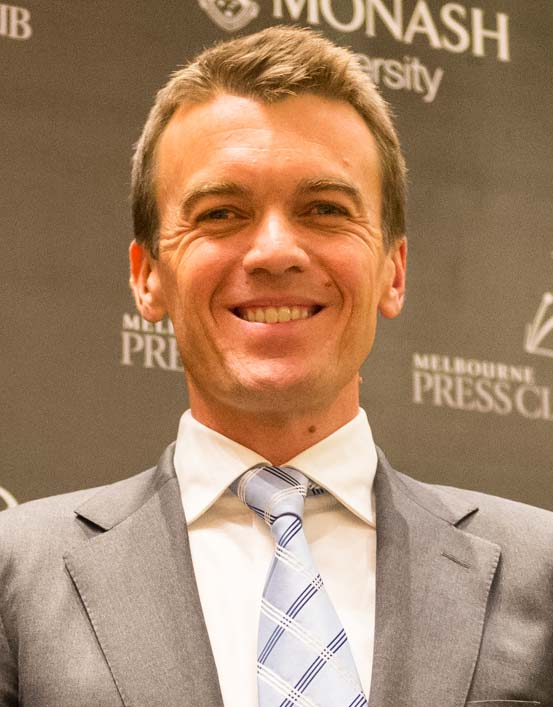
- Rowland in 2014
- Born: July 1968 (age 58); Australia
- Education: University of Technology Sydney
- Occupations: Journalist, television news and current affairs presenter
- Spouse: Nicola Webber (m. 2002)
- Presenting career
- Show: News Breakfast, 7.30
- Network: Australian Broadcasting Corporation

Michael Rowland (born July 1968) is an Australian journalist, known for presenting news and current affairs programs on ABC Television. After a 39-year career spent in a variety of roles at the Australian Broadcasting Corporation (ABC), most recently on News Breakfast and then 7.30, his last day with the broadcaster was 27 February 2026.

== Early life and education ==
Rowland was born in July 1968, the eldest of five children. He grew up in inner-west Sydney, where his father was a public servant in a New South Wales state electricity authority.

He achieved a good enough grade at high school to get into a journalism degree at the University of Technology Sydney (UTS). His first job was as a management trainee at Westpac banking group, where he only stayed three months.

After a year of studies at UTS, and working as a copy boy at the Sydney tabloid The Sun, he left after the ABC offered him a cadetship in January 1987.

In 1988, Rowland was hit in the eye by an acorn fired from a slingshot by "some idiot... taking pot-shots at cars". Although doctors saved his eye, the dilation became permanent. Rowland also has colour blindness, which was not caused by the incident.

== Career ==
Rowland began his career as a cadet journalist with the ABC aged 18 in January 1987, and worked in news and current affairs with the broadcaster for most of the following four decades. He covered the 1989 Newcastle earthquake. In the 1990s, after a spell covering New South Wales politics, he spent five years in the ABC's Parliament House bureau, part of the Canberra Press Gallery in Canberra, filing for Radio News and Lateline. During this time he learnt about news reporting and journalism as a news cadet for over a year.

In 1988, he transferred to a position as a New South Wales state political reporter. He then progressed to a finance reporter in 1991 for the ABC. He met his future News Breakfast co-host Lisa Millar while covering the 1996 federal election at the ABC's Canberra Bureau.

Rowland was Lateline's business and economics correspondent, and also covered business and economics for a range of other ABC TV and radio outlets including AM, current affairs morning program, The World Today, a current affairs program, PM, The Midday Report, Inside Business, the economic and financial focused branch of ABC and the 7 pm TV news.

He then became the ABC's North America correspondent, spending four years in the role. During this time, he covered stories including the election of Barack Obama as US president, the outbreak of the 2008 financial crisis (as the ABC's Wall Street correspondent), and David Hicks's release from Guantanamo Bay detention camp.

In July 2010, Rowland was appointed co-host of News Breakfast, replacing Joe O'Brien. The show presented mostly news, with some intervening segments of light entertainment. He co-hosted the show with Virginia Trioli from the ABC's Southbank studios in Melbourne. The show was broadcast on ABC1 / ABC TV and ABC News 24. Rowland and Trioli alternated reading the 9am news, and on big news days, he was sometimes on an hour after the end of the show – up to four hours of non-stop television.

In May 2019, Rowland was one of the reporters on ABC's Australia Votes series about the 2019 federal election. In June 2019, the ABC announced that Rowland would take on an expanded role as senior network presenter for ABC's morning news breakfast program. In addition to News Breakfast, Rowland would anchor coverage of major domestic and international events across ABC News programs, including the 7 pm News, the breakfast segment for ABC News, and ABC Radio.

Rowland covered the 2020 and 2024 United States presidential elections, presenting live results for News Breakfast. He remained in the role for 15 years, hosting his last show on 13 December 2024.

On 23 February 2026 Rowland announced his retirement from the ABC, effective Friday 27 February. He has cited a desire to spend more time with his sick wife and family.

== Other activities ==
Rowland was the vice-president of the Melbourne Press Club until his resignation in 2019 due to conflict between two other major members of the board. He is still considered a life member of the club, and has been acknowledged by them for his work and contribution to the club and journalism.

In January 2021 HarperCollins published Black Summer: Stories of loss, courage and community from the 2019–2020 bushfires. The book was edited by Rowland, with proceeds being contributed to the Red Cross Disaster Relief and Recovery Fund, as a means to provide support to the families who lost loved ones and homes during the 2019–20 Australian bushfire season.

In March 2026, Rowland appeared in the music video for Dom Dolla's remix of "Addicted to Bass" by Puretone.

== Personal life ==
Rowland married Nicola Webber in 2002, after meeting her in Canberra when both were working as political journalists. They have two children. She was diagnosed with a health issue in 2025, and in 2026 Rowland quit the ABC to help care for her and spend more time with his family.

Rowland is a fan of the Western Bulldogs, and began supporting them after returning from the United States to co-anchor News Breakfast when it launched midway through 2010. After he and his family settled in Melbourne his son supported the team. In 2016, he interviewed the Western Bulldogs president Peter Gordon on News Breakfast less than 48 hours after the club ended its 62-year-long premiership drought. Rowland described this experience as a big highlight in his years on the show, with Gordon allowing him to hold onto the AFL Premiership Cup. Rowland has also stated that of his interviews with celebrities on News Breakfast, his favourite was with American actor Alan Alda, who appeared on the show to promote science education.
