= Insight (Australian TV program) =

Australian TV series

- Genre: Current affairs
- Presented by: Kumi Taguchi
- Country of origin: Australia
- Original language: English
- No. of seasons: 21

Production
- Running time: Approximately 60 minutes

Original release
- Network: SBS TV / SBS Viceland
- Release: 1995 – present

Insight is a current affairs television program with a live participating audience, broadcast on the SBS network. Each program covers a single issue, often relevant to contemporary social and political discourse, and features studio guests participating in the discussion.

== History ==
Debuting in 1995, Insight started out as a national domestic current affairs program dealing primarily with Australian issues, while Dateline covered international ones. It was hosted from 1999 until 2001 by Gael Jennings. After that, Jenny Brockie, coming from the ABC, began to host the programme.

Soon thereafter, the format was transformed to "a discussion forum focusing on a single issue with the participation of a studio audience". In the course of the programme, there are sometimes live satellite links to experts from around the globe, but the main focus in recent times (as of 2019) is on the studio guests who talk about their personal experience of various issues, with contributions by selected audience members. Recent episodes have focused on more personal issues and challenges faced by ordinary people. Topics have included Indigenous issues, endometriosis, school bullying, ME/CFS, and transgender issues.

Jenny Brockie quit the programme in October 2020, with no immediate announcement of a new host for 2021, although it has been stated that the show will continue. In November 2020, Kumi Taguchi was named as the new host of Insight.

Janice Peterson, Marc Fennell, Alice Matthews, Karla Grant and Anton Enus are fill-in presenters.
