= Fauziah Ibrahim =

Australian journalist

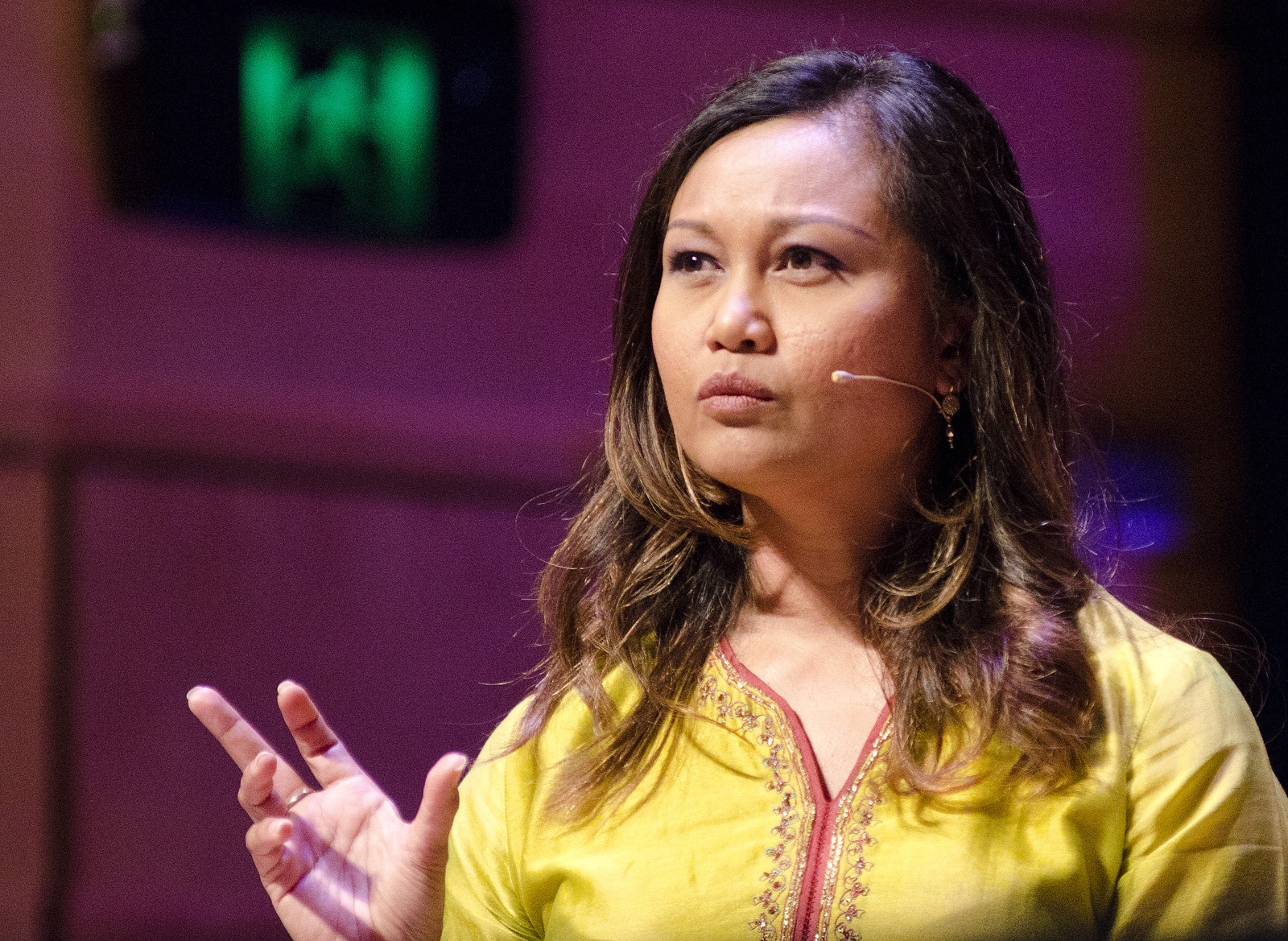
- Fauziah Ibrahim speaking about journalism at the Australian Skeptics National Convention 2017
- Born: Fauziah Ibrahim; Singapore
- Citizenship: Australian
- Occupation: Journalist
- Employer: Australian Broadcasting Corporation

Fauziah Ibrahim is a Singaporean-born Australian news presenter.

== Career ==
Fauziah started her career as a producer and presenter at 6AM RadioWest, then as a reporter for the Australian Broadcasting Corporation in Perth. She later worked as a producer and presenter for NewsRadio 93.8 in Singapore and as anchor, producer and reporter for Channel i News.

She also was a producer for BBC's Asia Business Report and anchor for CNBC Asia's World News.

Fauziah was with Al Jazeera English from 2008 and was an anchor at the channel's main broadcast centre, in Doha in Qatar, where she was a presenter on the flagship programme Newshour. Previously, she was the host of the station's Asia-focused current affairs program 101 East, where she was nominated for an Asian Television Award for Best Current Affairs Presenter in 2011.

In 2016, Fauziah joined Australia's ABC News as a news presenter and in January 2020 was appointed co-host of Weekend Breakfast replacing Josh Szeps.

Fauziah was criticised in April 2022 for compiling Twitter lists labelling Australian Labor Party supporters as “lobotomised shitheads”. She subsequently took a temporary break from on-camera duties. She was allowed to return to normal duties with Weekend Breakfast in mid-2022.
