= One Plus One (TV program) =

Australian interview TV series

- Genre: Interview
- Presented by: Jane Hutcheon; Barrie Cassidy; Kurt Fearnley; Stan Grant; Courtney Act; Rosie Batty
- Country of origin: Australia
- Original language: English

Production
- Running time: 28 minutes

Original release
- Network: ABC News
- Release: 2010 – present

Related
- The Drum, Planet America

One Plus One is an Australian long form television interview program on ABC TV. Each episode explores the life and career of a prominent individual.

The program is broadcast nationally across Australia, streamed live on iview, and broadcast in over 40 countries across the Asia/Pacific region on the ABC's international channel, ABC Australia.

The program premiered in July 2010 on the ABC News Channel, and was hosted by journalist Jane Hutcheon until 2019.

== History ==
One Plus One premiered in 2010 with the launch of the ABC's 24-hour news channel. The original program was hosted by Jane Hutcheon, and featured ten-minute interviews with guests, with one of the interviews conducted by Hutcheon and the other two conducted by other ABC journalists.

In 2012 the format changed, with the interviews extended to 28 minutes long and all conducted by Hutcheon. This format continued until 2019.

In 2020, the program was moved to the prime time slot of 9.30pm on Thursdays on the primary ABC TV channel with a half-hour runtime. The new format brought in a rotation of presenters, with prominent Australians in the hosting chair for a series of episodes based around a theme. In 2020 journalist Barrie Cassidy explored the idea of leadership, Paralympian Kurt Fearnley spoke to people about excellence, and Stan Grant did a series of interviews about identity.

In 2021, the program moved to the primetime slot of 8pm Monday nights, with drag queen and television personality Courtney Act as host. Act's program was nominated for an AACTA Award that year.

In 2022 former Australian of the Year Rosie Batty was added to roster of hosts on the show.

== See also ==
- List of Australian television series
- List of programs broadcast by ABC (Australian TV network)
- List of longest-running Australian television series
