= ABC News Channel =

Australian 24-hour TV news channel

- Logo used since 2024
- Type: News and current affairs channel
- Country: Australia
- Broadcast area: Broadcast in Australia nationally and internationally
- Network: ABC Television
- Headquarters: Ultimo, New South Wales

Programming
- Language: English
- Picture format: 1080i HDTV

Ownership
- Owner: Australian Broadcasting Corporation
- Sister channels: ABC TV; ABC TV HD; ABC Kids; ABC Family; ABC Entertains; ABC Australia

History
- Launched: 22 June 2010; 16 years ago
- Replaced: ABC HD (HD channel space; 2008–10, relaunched on 6 December 2016)
- Former names: ABC News 24 (2010–2017)

Links
- Website: abc.net.au/news/newschannel

Availability

Terrestrial
- ABN Sydney (DVB-T): 544 @ 12 (226.5 MHz)
- ABV Melbourne (DVB-T): 560 @ 12 (226.5 MHz)
- ABQ Brisbane (DVB-T): 576 @ 12 (226.5 MHz)
- ABS Adelaide (DVB-T): 592 @ 12 (226.5 MHz)
- ABW Perth/Mandurah (DVB-T): 736 @ 12 (226.5 MHz)
- ABT Hobart (DVB-T): 624 @ 8 (191.5 MHz)
- ABD Darwin (DVB-T): 640 @ 30 (543.5 MHz)
- Freeview: Channel 24

Streaming media
- ABC iview: ABC iview Live Stream
- ABC News website: ABC News Live Stream (Australia only)
- YouTube: Live Stream

The ABC News Channel is an Australian 24-hour news channel launched and owned by the Australian Broadcasting Corporation. The channel replaced and used the then-former ABC HD channel space (which simulcast ABC TV in high definition) and commenced broadcasting as ABC News 24 at 7:30pm (AEST) on Thursday, 22 July 2010.

The network is a division of ABC News. The majority of the channel's content is produced from the studios of the ABC's Sydney station, ABN, in Ultimo, Sydney which the public can view being presented from an atrium looking into the news presentation studio. The ABC's breakfast television programme, News Breakfast, Afternoon Briefing and the evening programme The World are produced at ABV Southbank, Melbourne (weekdays).

Initially launched in MPEG-2 high definition, the channel's picture format reduced to standard definition on 6 December 2016, following the relaunch of ABC HD. The HD feed, however, gradually rolled out as an alternative option via ABC iView, the ABC News website and on Youtube; before restoring it, now in the MPEG-4 encoding format, to terrestrial viewers in June 2025.

== History ==
The ABC announced in January 2010 that it planned to launch a 24-hour news channel. The logo of ABC News 24 was revealed by Freeview in their new promotion on Tuesday 22 June. The official promotional reel for the channel was launched on digital channel 24 between 6 and 8 July.

Speculation about a launch date for the channel took place in the weeks prior to the official announcement. The Daily Telegraph claimed in early July that the channel would be delayed due to technical issues at the ABC's new playout facility, MediaHub, in south west Sydney while other outlets reported that the channel was on track to begin in mid-July.

The ABC announced on 13 July 2010 that the channel would have its first live broadcast on 22 July.

In November 2016, the ABC announced that ABC News 24 and ABC NewsRadio would be rebranded under a unified ABC News brand. The relaunch occurred on 10 April 2017.

On 22 July 2024, the ABC announced that the entire ABC News division would receive a new look, including for the channel. The relaunch occurred on 19 August 2024.

On 19 May 2025, the ABC announced that the channel will be in high definition again, this time as MPEG-4, alongside ABC Entertains. The changes will occur between 11 and 26 June 2025.

== Reception ==
Since the commencement of regular broadcasting, the reaction to the new news channel has been mixed. A particular concern has been the pressure placed upon the budget and operations of both the news division of the ABC, as well as the broadcaster as a whole, particularly the shifting of funds from other departments like drama, Indigenous, documentary and children's owing to the decision to launch the channel without additional Government funding, as was the case with the recent launch of the children's channel ABC3 (now named ABC Entertains).

In Senate Estimates hearings in February 2012, the broadcaster confirmed a $2.5 million shortfall in the budget for its news and current affairs division and imposed a 1.5% cut in newsroom budgets, though denies the link to the channel, instead pointing to recent major news events in the past year such as the Christchurch earthquakes and flooding in Queensland and Victoria. However, Independent Senator Nick Xenophon has blamed the reported $20 million annual cost of the network for cutbacks in ABC TV sports coverage of the SANFL.

However, the network has seen success with high viewership compared to competitor Sky News Australia, with reach exceeding 2 million viewers weekly, tripling that of Sky News.

The channel's highest primetime viewership share was 9.5% during the 2016 Federal election coverage on 2 July 2016.

== Programming ==
ABC News presented by Juanita Phillips

ABC News programming consists of a mix of live news bulletins, time-shifted repeats of existing ABC News output from ABC TV, live broadcasts from events (such as Parliament Question Time and selected press conferences), documentaries and factual and arts programming. These draw upon the ABC's own resources and those of its partner broadcasters, the BBC, SABC, TVNZ, PBS, NHK, and Al Jazeera English.

On weekdays, throughout most of the day, straight news programming is presented from one of the studios in Ultimo. General rolling news continues from 8pm AEST/AEDT (only interrupted from 9:45pm to 11pm by a specialist Asian-focused business bulletin and The World) before ABC News switches to the overnight format at 12:30am AEST/AEDT which features a mix of repeats of the day's programs and (usually live) news content from the partner broadcasters.

On weekends, except the Weekend Breakfast news block, the channel airs a live news bulletin at the top of almost all hours, which lasts 15 or 30 minutes. Occasionally it is a one-minute headline recap. A live news hour is featured on Sundays at 7pm. ABC News switches to the overnight format at 12:15am AEST/AEDT, without any live newscast until the next morning.

Live newscasters are Gemma Veness and Kathryn Robinson (ABC News Mornings), Ros Childs (ABC News at Noon and ABC News Day), Patricia Karvelas (Afternoon Briefing), Joe O'Brien (ABC News Tonight), Craig Smart or Jade Barker (weekday editions of ABC Late News/News Overnight), Ruby Cornish (weekends), Mariam Saab and Meridth Sheenan (ABC News Weekend and weekend editions of ABC Late News/News Overnight). Specialist and feature programming includes a daily business programme covering the Asia-Pacific region and an international bulletin with Girish Sawlani entitled The World presented from ABC Melbourne Studio.

=== News Breakfast and ABC News at Noon ===
Existing shows News Breakfast and ABC News at Noon are broadcast live on the ABC News channel at the same time as on ABC TV in AEST/AEDT time zones; viewers in the AWST and ACST time zones can choose to watch these programs either live (on the ABC News channel) or on delay in their local time (on ABC TV). In addition, The Business is shown in an earlier timeslot than currently scheduled on ABC TV.

=== Capital Hill ===
On 30 September 2010, the ABC announced the first new programme to be shown on the channel titled Capital Hill. The political programme, originally hosted by Chris Uhlmann airs Fridays at 5:30pm AEST/AEDT and takes a look at the week's political events and news, as well as feature interviews with the key players of politics. It is no longer broadcast.

=== World news ===
The World presented by Scott Bevan

Overnight, the ABC News channel uses "satellite" programming, mainly Deutsche Welle news and current affairs bulletins and sometimes using shows such as Impact with Yalda Hakim, Outside Source with Ros Atkins and Global with Matthew Amroliwala. The BBC World News broadcasts come live into the ABC News channel before being broadcast around Australia. About two Al Jazeera English Newshours are also broadcast. However, since 2018, the overnight programming has slowly refocused on rebroadcasts of the channel's daytime live shows like The Drum and The World (on weekdays), and ABC's own live news updates have increasingly carried.

=== Repeated from ABC TV ===
- 7.30
- Insiders
- Offsiders
- Australian Story
- Q&A
- Four Corners
- Landline
- Big Ideas
- Foreign Correspondent

== Criticism ==
Along with other rolling news channels, the ABC News channel has been criticised for launching into rolling news coverage for "breaking news" where little new information supports such coverage, and just repeating limited information and footage about an event. Conversely, the ABC News channel has also been criticised for not turning to rolling coverage.

== ABC News online ==
The ABC News channel can be streamed online at the ABC's website and on YouTube. However, the YouTube stream is made available internationally except for the stream in iView where it is only available in Australia only, and unlike other programming on iView, it is not currently offered as unmetered content by any internet service providers. The ABC News channel stream is available in medium and high bandwidth varieties on the iView site.

== News programs and presenters ==
=== National programs ===
- News Breakfast with James Glenday and Bridget Brennan
- ABC News Mornings with Gemma Veness (Monday – Wednesday) and Kathryn Robinson (Thursday – Friday)
- ABC News at Noon with Kathryn Robinson (Monday) and Ros Childs (Tuesday – Friday)
- ABC News Day with Ros Childs
- Afternoon Briefing with Patricia Karvelas
- The Business with David Taylor (Monday – Tuesday) and Alicia Barry (Wednesday - Thursday)
- ABC News with Joe O'Brien
- 7.30 with Sarah Ferguson
- The World with Girish Sawlani (Monday – Thursday) and Manny Tsigas (Friday)
- ABC Late News with Craig Smart or Jade Barker
- Weekend Breakfast with Johanna Nicholson and Fauziah Ibrahim
- Insiders with David Speers
- The Regions with Amy Culpitt

=== State and territory bulletins ===
- ABC News NSW with Jeremy Fernandez (Sunday – Thursday) and Lydia Feng (Friday – Saturday)
- ABC News QLD with Jessica Van Vonderen (Sunday – Thursday) and Lexy Hamilton-Smith (Friday – Saturday)
- ABC News ACT with Greg Jennett (Sunday – Thursday) and Adrienne Francis (Friday – Saturday)
- ABC News TAS with Guy Stayner (Monday – Friday) and Sabra Lane (Saturday – Sunday)
- ABC News VIC with Tamara Oudyn (Sunday – Thursday) and Iskhandar Razak (Friday – Saturday)
- ABC News SA with Jessica Harmsen (Monday – Thursday) and Bethanie Alderson (Friday – Sunday)
- ABC News WA with Pamela Medlen (Monday – Thursday) and Charlotte Hamlyn (Friday – Sunday)
- ABC News NT with Kyle Dowling (Sunday – Thursday) and Paul Murphy (Friday – Saturday)

=== Former presenters ===
- Ali Moore – Afternoon Live, 2010
- Chris Uhlmann – Political editor and host of Capital Hill, 2010
- Juanita Phillips – ABC Evening & ABC News NSW, 2003–2022
- Lyndal Curtis – Political editor and host of Capital Hill, 2011–2014
- Scott Bevan – Afternoon Live, 2010–2015
- Ticky Fullerton – The Business, 2010–2016
- Stan Grant – Matter of Fact, 2018
- Jane Hutcheon – One Plus One, 2010–2019
- Karina Carvalho – ABC Evening News & ABC News Mornings, 2018–2023
- Beverley O'Connor – The World, 2018–2024
- Dan Bourchier – ABC News ACT and ABC Mornings 2016–2025
- Michael Tetlow – ABC Late News, 2018–2026

== International bureaus ==
=== Current ===
As of February 2026 there were bureaus in the following cities:

- Jakarta
- Jerusalem
- London
- New Delhi
- Tokyo
- Washington, DC

=== Former ===
- Amman — A former Middle East base later absorbed into larger regional hubs as coverage consolidated.
- Auckland — ABC’s New Zealand bureau; closed when trans‑Tasman coverage shifted to Sydney‑based reporters.
- Beijing — A major bureau for more than 30 years; closed in 2020 after ABC correspondents were forced to leave China.
- Beirut — Long‑standing Middle East bureau; replaced by Jerusalem as the primary regional base.
- Brussels — Former European/European Union bureau; closed as London became the central European hub.
- Hanoi — A minor 1990s bureau; briefly reactivated in 2019 for the US–North Korea summit.
- Hong Kong — ABC’s first China‑facing bureau, opened in 1972, before Beijing became accessible .
- Honiara — Operated in the 1940s as part of ABC’s early Pacific reporting presence.
- Johannesburg — ABC’s Africa bureau for many years; closed due to budget cuts and a shift to fly‑in reporting.
- Kabul — Operated during major conflict periods; closed as security conditions worsened.
- Kuala Lumpur — A 1960s Southeast Asia bureau; later replaced by Bangkok and then Jakarta as regional hubs.
- Moscow — One of ABC’s oldest foreign bureaus, operating for 23 years; closed due to budget cuts.
- Nairobi — Former East Africa bureau; closed as ABC reduced its permanent African presence.
- New York — Previously part of ABC’s North American network; consolidated into Washington, DC.
- Port Moresby — Long‑running Pacific bureau; closed as ABC shifted to rotating Pacific correspondents.
- Singapore — Former Southeast Asia bureau; replaced by Bangkok and later Jakarta.
- Toronto — Former Canada bureau; closed when North American coverage was centralised in Washington, DC.

== Overseas correspondents ==
- Matthew Doran – Jerusalem (Middle East correspondent)
- Mazoe Ford – London (Europe Bureau Chief)
- Rachel Clayton – New Delhi (South Asia correspondent)
- Kathryn Diss – London (Europe correspondent)
- Bridget Rollason – London (Europe correspondent)

== Logo history ==
=== Branding gallery ===
9 April 2017 – 19 August 2024

19 August 2024 – present

== See also ==
- List of digital television channels in Australia
