= Joe O'Brien (journalist) =

Australian television news presenter

- Occupations: Journalist and Television Presenter
- Years active: 1995–present
- Known for: working for the Australian Broadcasting Corporation
- Television: News Breakfast; ABC News Mornings

Joe O'Brien (born 1968 or 1969) is an Australian journalist and news presenter.

O'Brien is best known for his lengthy tenure hosting ABC News Mornings on the ABC News channel, which he has hosted since the channel's inception in 2010 until 2023.

He joined the Australian Broadcasting Corporation in 1995, initially based at the local ABC station in Rockhampton, Queensland before moving to Brisbane where he worked as a reporter and presenter. O'Brien then moved to Sydney, where he regularly anchored The Midday Report on ABC TV.

Upon the launch of the ABC's new weekday breakfast program News Breakfast on ABC2 in late 2008, O'Brien was appointed as the co-host of its Friday edition.

As the ABC prepared to launch its new 24-hour news channel in 2010, O'Brien was announced as one of its presenters in April 2010. He commenced hosting ABC News Mornings on 23 July 2010.

During the Australian Marriage Law Postal Survey in 2017, O'Brien's questioning of the Australian Christian Lobby's Lyle Shelton was criticised by commentators Tom Switzer and Andrew Bolt who both believed O'Brien had suggested same sex marriage opponents had no right to support gay athletes such as Ian Thorpe.

In May 2023, O'Brien announced that after 13 years he will switch from hosting ABC News Mornings to host ABC Evening News on the ABC News channel.

== Personal life ==
O'Brien grew up in Innisfail, Queensland after his parents moved from New South Wales with their four young children around 1970.

In 1999, he performed as a back-up dancer for Dannii Minogue at the Sydney Gay and Lesbian Mardi Gras.

O'Brien was a brother-in-law to Australian rugby league player Peter Jackson, who died from a heroin overdose in 1997, and in 2015, he introduced an Australian Story episode which profiled his sister, Jackson's widow Siobhan Jackson.

O'Brien is fully vaccinated against COVID-19 having received his first dose of the Oxford–AstraZeneca COVID-19 vaccine in May 2021 and his second dose in July 2021. A photo of him after receiving his second dose garnered attention due to his prominent biceps.
