= History of the Australian Broadcasting Corporation =

History of the Australian national public broadcaster

The Australian Broadcasting Corporation had its origins in a licensing scheme for individual radio stations administered by the Postmaster-General's Department established in 1923 into a content provider in radio, television and new media. From 1928, the National Broadcasting Service was established to take over 12 radio licences as a national broadcaster, while the Australian Broadcasting Company (a private company established in 1924) was responsible for supplying programs to the service.

The Australian Broadcasting Commission was established on 1 July 1932, funded by the Australian Government and bound by legislation enshrined in the Australian Broadcasting Commission Act 1932. During and after the war, the ABC was given statutory powers that reinforced its independence from the government and enhanced its news-gathering role. From July 1946, the broadcaster was required by new legislation to broadcast parliamentary sessions from the Australian Parliament, and its news services were expanded.

A national television service was introduced in November 1956, and ABC news bureaus were established in several countries through the 1960s and 1970s. During those decades too, ABC TV showcased rock 'n roll music on music programmes Six O'Clock Rock and Countdown.

The Australian Broadcasting Corporation Act 1983 changed the name of the organisation from the "Australian Broadcasting Commission" to the "Australian Broadcasting Corporation", effective 1 July 1983. The ABC Multimedia Unit was established in 1995, to manage the new ABC website.

== Origins ==
=== Background ===
The first public radio station in Australia opened in Sydney at 8:00pm on 23 November 1923 under the call sign 2SB (later 2BL), which was the first full-time radio station in Australia. Other stations in Melbourne, Brisbane, Adelaide, Perth and Hobart followed. A licensing scheme administered by the Postmaster-General's Department was soon established, allowing certain stations government funding, albeit with restrictions placed on their advertising content.

In 1924, the licensing system was changed. The Postmaster-General's Department collected all licence fees and broadcasters were funded as either A-Class or B-Class stations. A-Class stations (funded largely by listeners' subscriptions) received government funding and were able to take limited advertising, while B-Class stations received no government funding but could carry more advertising.

A 1927 Royal Commission into wireless broadcasting recommended that radio licence fees be pooled to fund larger A-Class stations. The government established the National Broadcasting Service to take over the 12 A-Class licences as they came up for renewal from 1928 through to 1930, at the same time acquiring the stations transmitters and studios. The original legislation permitted advertising, but this was removed from the Act before it came into effect. At the same time, the government contracted the Australian Broadcasting Company, a private company established in 1924, to supply programs to the new national broadcaster.

Initially the Postmaster-General's Department, which operated postal and telephone services, was responsible for operating the National Broadcasting Service, but this arrangement did not have universal political support.

=== Establishment of the ABC ===
The Australian Broadcasting Commission was established on 1 July 1932 by the Australian Broadcasting Commission Act 1932, to take over the Australian Broadcasting Company and run the National Broadcasting Service. The ABC was to be based on the BBC model, funded primarily from listener license fees with some direct government grants.

ABC stations in 1932

The Australian Broadcasting Commission's original twelve radio stations were:

- 2FC Sydney
- 2BL Sydney
- 3AR Melbourne
- 3LO Melbourne
- 4QG Brisbane
- 5CL Adelaide
- 6WF Perth
- 7ZL Hobart
- 2NC Newcastle
- 2CO Corowa (Albury)
- 4RK Rockhampton
- 5CK Crystal Brook

These formed the basis for the present-day ABC Local Radio and Radio National networks.

At its inception, the commission was headed by five commissioners appointed by the Governor-General. From these five commissioners, one was appointed to the office of chairperson and another to the office of vice-chairperson. This board of directors then appointed a General Manager that did not have the office of commissioner. International broadcaster Radio Australia was incorporated into the Australian Broadcasting Commission in 1932.

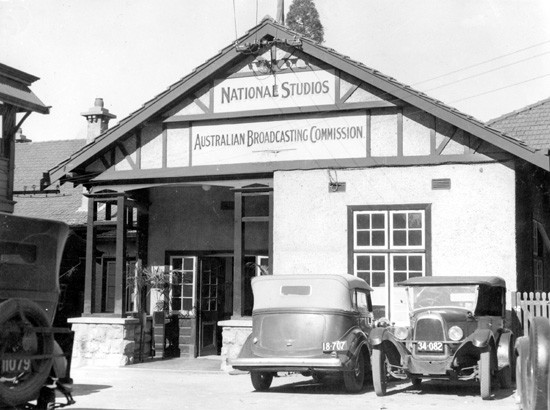
The ABC's Perth headquarters in 1937

The opening-day program included the first Children's Session with 'Bobby Bluegum', the first sports program, 'Racing Notes', with WA Ferry calling the Randwick races, 'British Wireless News', received by cable from London, weather, stock exchange and shipping news, the ABC Women's Association session (on 'common-sense housekeeping' and needlecraft), a talk on goldfish and their care, as well as 'Morning Devotions' and music. Conductor Sir Bernard Heinze was appointed part-time musical adviser to the ABC in 1934, while in 1937, the network was further expanded with the purchase of Brisbane's 4BC. Two years later, the commission began publishing the ABC Weekly – a radio magazine promoting the ABC's local radio, and later television, programs.

Over the next four years, the stations were reformed into a cohesive broadcasting organisation through regular program relays, coordinated by a centralised bureaucracy. The Australian broadcast radio spectrum at the time was made up of the ABC and the commercial sector.

During the broadcaster's first decades, programs generally consisted of music, news and current affairs, sport, drama, religion, children's educational supplements and school broadcasts. Because recording technology was still relatively primitive, all ABC programs (including music) were broadcast live until 1935, when the first disc-based recorder was installed at the commission's Sydney studios. For this purpose, the ABC established broadcasting orchestras in each state, and in some centres employed choruses and dance bands.

Among the other early programs were the stations' famous "synthetic" cricket broadcasts – when tests were played in England, commentators in the ABC's Sydney studios used cables from London and sound effects to recreate the match in play. In addition, all 38 of William Shakespeare's plays were performed live between 1936 and 1938. Local drama was also produced, with a competition for plays and sketches from Australian authors held in 1934. Talks from prominent figures of the time such as King George V, Pope Pius XI, British Prime Minister Ramsay MacDonald, German Chancellor Adolf Hitler and H. G. Wells were also broadcast.

By 1933, regular program relays were in place between the ABC's stations in Sydney, Melbourne, Brisbane, Adelaide and Perth – it was not until 1936 that Hobart was connected with the mainland, through a cable under the Bass Strait. News bulletins, however, continued to be read in each state from local newspapers (by agreement with the Newspaper Proprietors Association). It was not until 1934 that the ABC hired its first journalist – the service continued to be expanded, with the appointment of a Federal News Editor in 1936, and in 1939 a Canberra correspondent to cover national politics.

In November 1935, Sir Charles Moses was appointed general manager at the age of 35, a position he would hold until his retirement in 1965.

News broadcasts were initially restricted, due to pressure from Sir Keith Murdoch, who controlled many Australian newspapers. However, journalists such as Frank Dixon and John Hinde began to subvert the agreements in the late 1930s. in 1939, Warren Denning was appointed to Canberra as the first ABC political correspondent, after Murdoch had refused to allow his newspapers to cover a speech by Joseph Lyons.

== World War II ==
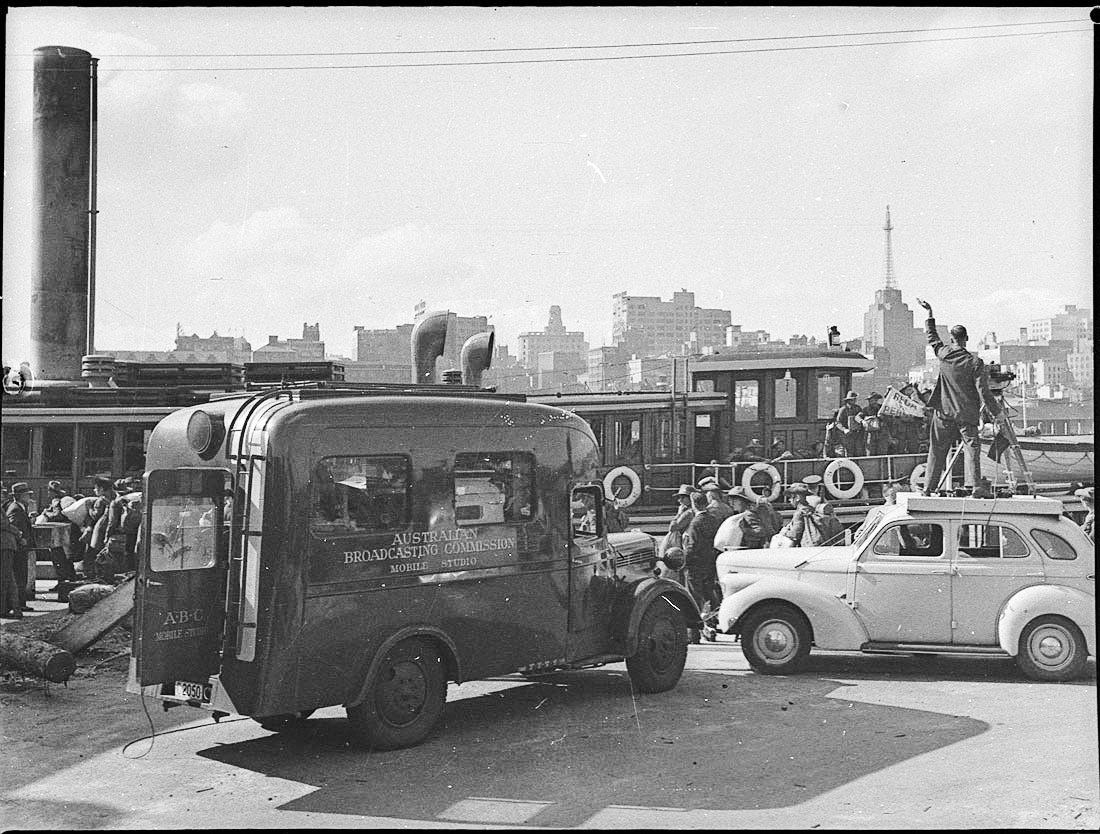
ABC truck recording soldiers leaving for war, Darling Harbour, 1940

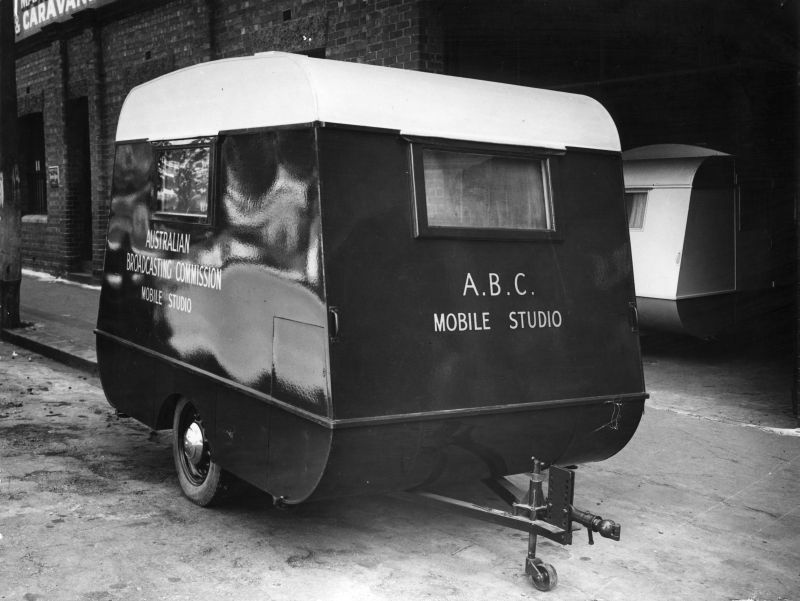
ABC mobile studio caravan, used for concerts presented by the ABC at army camps and other locations, 1940

During World War II, the ABC continued to recruit staff, including a greater proportion of women to replace men who had joined the armed forces. In 1941 Margaret Doyle became the first female radio announcer on Australian national radio. The organisation established reporting and recording facilities in a number of overseas locations, including the Middle East, Greece and around the Asia-Pacific region. An early challenge to its independence came in June 1940 when wartime censorship was imposed, meaning that the Department of Information (headed by Sir Keith Murdoch) took control of the ABC's 7pm nightly national news bulletin. This lasted until September, when control of the news was returned to the ABC after listeners expressed a preference for independent news presented by the commission.

In 1940 one of the ABC Board's most prominent members, Dick Boyer, was appointed to the ABC, becoming chairman on 1 April 1945. Today known for the continuing series of Boyer Lectures initiated by him in 1959, he had a good but not too close with the general manager Sir Charles Moses, and remained chair until his retirement in 1961.

During the war, the ABC's news bulletins attained a reputation for authority and independence, and from 1942 onwards, were broadcast three times daily through all national and most commercial transmitters. During and after the war, the ABC was given statutory powers that reinforced its independence from the government and enhanced its news-gathering role.

On 7 January 1941, the ABC revived the Children's Session as a national program, including the "Argonauts Club", which was first broadcast in 1933–34 in Melbourne. The Argonauts Club proved hugely popular with young Australians – by 1950 there were over 50,000 members, with 10,000 new members joining each year through 1950s. The Club encouraged children's contributions of writing, music, poetry and art, and became one of the ABC's most popular programs, running six days a week for 28 years.

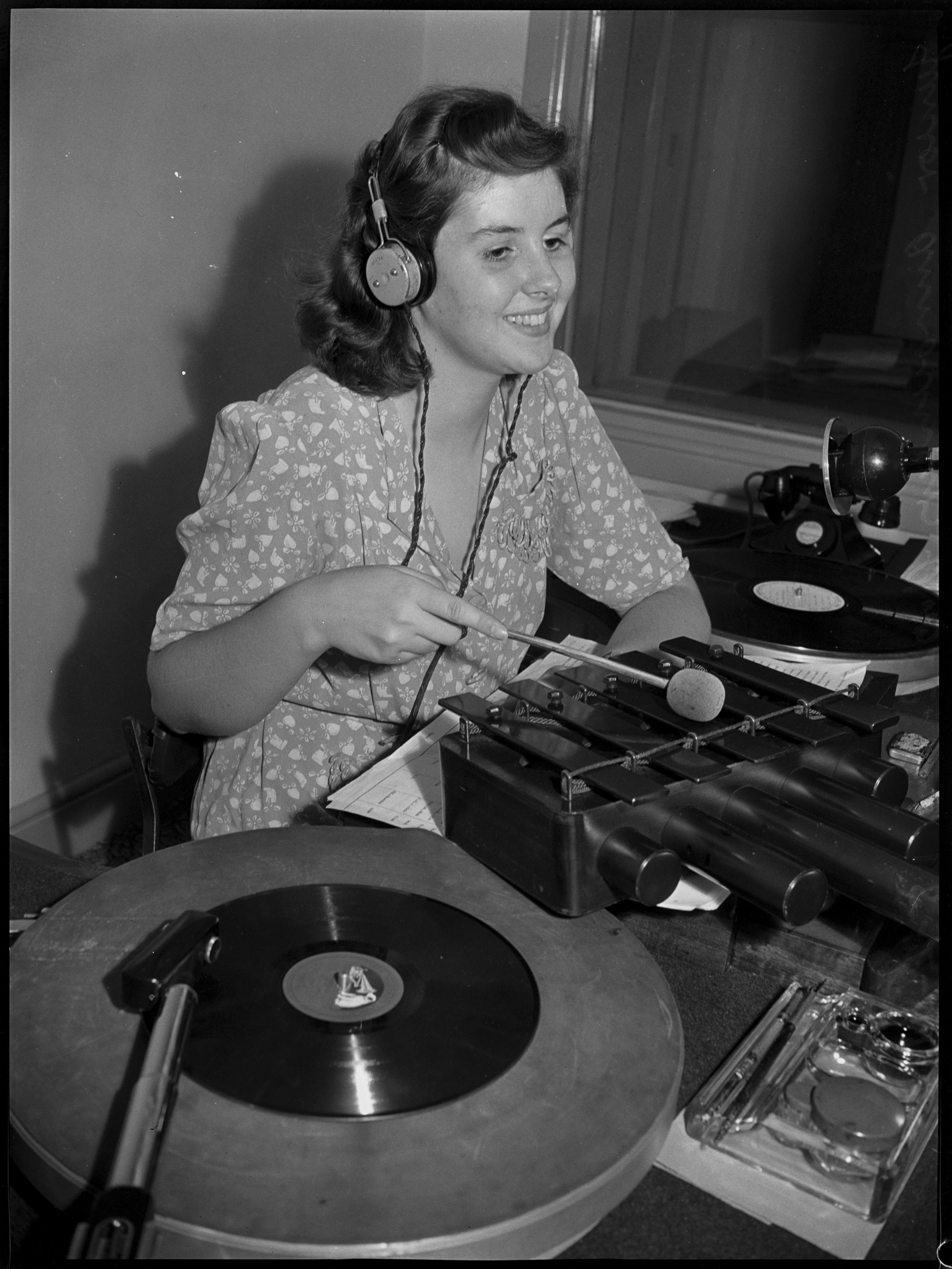
Patricia Delaney, junior announcer at ABC, 18 February 1944

In 1942, The Australian Broadcasting Act 1942 was passed, giving the ABC the power to decide when, and in what circumstances, political speeches should be broadcast. Directions from the Minister about whether or not to broadcast any matter now had to be made in writing, and any exercise of the power had to be mentioned in the commission's Annual Report. It was used only once, in 1963. In the same year, "Kindergarten of the Air" began on ABC Radio in Perth. The Act required that one of the commissioners be a woman. It was later broadcast nationally and became one of the ABC's most popular programs.

Boyer was determined to maintain the autonomy of the ABC and not allow it to be subject to interference by politicians, and was able to persuade Prime Minister John Curtin in 1945 to issue a public statement recognising the ABC's "special independence of judgement and action".

== Post-war ==
In December 1945, the long-running rural and regional affairs program The Country Hour premiered. The ABC's coverage of rural affairs was significantly enhanced by the deployment of journalists and "extension officers" to major country areas. The increasing availability of landlines and teleprinters allowed the organisation to gather and broadcast news and other program material with much greater efficiency than in the previous two decades. By this time, as many as 13 national news bulletins were broadcast daily.

Legislation passed in 1946 (the Parliamentary Proceedings Broadcasting Act 1946 (Note: "4 Broadcasting of parliamentary proceedings (1) Notwithstanding anything contained in the Australian Broadcasting Corporation Act 1983, the Australian Broadcasting Corporation shall broadcast the proceedings of the Senate, the House of Representatives or a joint sitting from: (a) a medium‑wave national broadcasting station in the capital city in each State and in the city of Newcastle in the State of New South Wales; and (b) such other national broadcasting stations (including shortwave national broadcasting stations) as are prescribed; upon such days and during such periods as the Committee determines.)) requiring the ABC to broadcast Parliament live when in session. The first broadcast from Parliament was of Question Time on 10 July 1946. The broadcasts were put onto the interstate network; however, the Commission frequently commented on the disruption this caused to its programming in its annual reports. The ABC was also required to "secure its news for broadcasting purposes within the Commonwealth by its own staff, and abroad through such overseas news agencies and other overseas sources as it desired" (along with its own foreign correspondents). The news department continued to expand, and was inaugurated on 1 June 1947.

Prime Minister Ben Chifley pledged that his government would aim to introduce television to the country as soon as possible. Changes to the ABC's funding structure took place in 1948. Amendments were made to the Broadcasting Act with the effect that the ABC would no longer receive its finances from licenses, but from a government appropriation. These amendments also increased the number of commissioners to seven, specifying that two must be public servants – one each from the Treasury departments and the Postmaster-General's Department. Boyer however continued to insist on the ABC's independence. (The requirement for public servants was dropped in the Broadcasting and Television Act 1956, but the need for seven commissioners was retained – this allowed for each state and territory to be represented.)

Changes made in the post-war moved "serious" programming such as news, current affairs, and features – early forms of what became known as documentaries to the commission's national network, with lighter entertainment programming left for the metropolitan stations. A Light Entertainment department was formed, to produce programs such as ABC Hit Parade, the Wilfrid Thomas Show, Bob Dyer's Dude Ranch and The Village Glee Club.

In 1956, the ABC had three international bureaux in London, New York and Port Moresby. In the same year, a new office opened in Singapore.

== The television era: 1956 ==
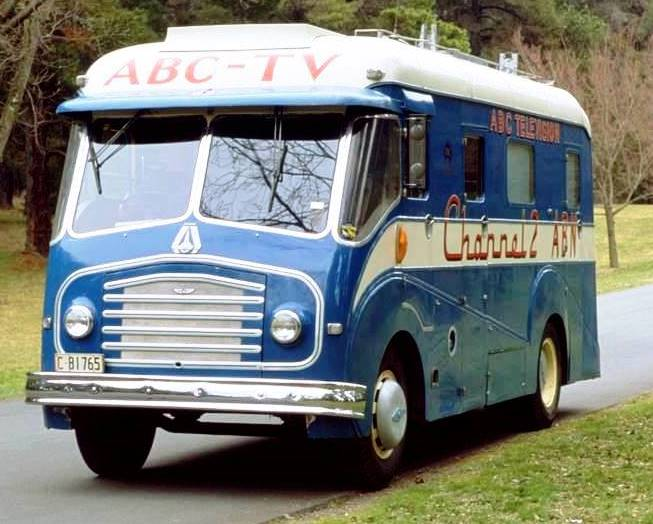
Morris Model FE Pye van used by ABN-2 in its first broadcast, November 1956

The first broadcast of ABC TV, presented by Michael Charlton, 5 November 1956

In 1953, the federal Television Act was passed, providing the initial regulatory framework for both the ABC and commercial television networks. Over the next three years, planning for the introduction of a national television service was put in place – land for studios and transmitters in Sydney and Melbourne was acquired, and overseas tutors were brought to Australia to assist with training.

The first national public television station in Australia opened in Sydney at 7:00pm on 5 November 1956 under the call sign ABN-2. It was opened by Prime Minister of Australia Robert Menzies, with the first television broadcast presented by Michael Charlton, and James Dibble reading the first television news bulletin. ABV-2 (Melbourne, Victoria) followed two weeks later at 7:00pm on 18 November 1956. Stations in other capital cities followed: ABQ-2 (Brisbane, Queensland) (1959), ABS-2 (Adelaide, South Australia) (1960), ABW-2 (Perth, Western Australia) (1960), and ABT-2 (Hobart, Tasmania) (1960). ABC-3 (Canberra) opened in 1961, and ABD-6 (Darwin, Northern Territory) opened in 1971, both named after the base city.

Although radio programs could be broadcast nationally by landline, television relay facilities were not put in place until the early 1960s. This meant that news bulletins had to be sent to each capital city by teleprinter, to be prepared and presented separately in each city, with filmed materials copied manually and sent to each state.

A purpose-built television studio was built in Sydney, and opened on 29 January 1958, replacing temporary sound studios used since the ABC's television services launched in 1956. In the same year, technical equipment was also moved to permanent locations, while main transmitters were introduced to Melbourne and Sydney in 1957 and 1958 respectively.

== 1960s and 1970s ==
Weekly current affairs program Four Corners began in 1961, followed in the same year by Profiles of Power, a series of interviews with prominent Australians. Direct relays between Sydney and Melbourne, as well as Canberra, were also established in 1961, replacing temporary microwave relays as a means of simultaneously airing programs across multiple stations., Videotape equipment, allowing the sharing of footage with much greater ease and speed, was installed in each state capital by 1962.

The ABC was one of the first television networks to embrace the rock'n'roll revolution of the late 1950s, most notably with Six O'Clock Rock, hosted by Johnny O'Keefe. During the 60s and early 70s the ABC continued to produce programs on popular music, including the pop show Hitscene, performance specials by groups such as Tully and Max Merritt & The Meteors, as well as the magazine-style program GTK, which premiered in 1969 and screened for 10 minutes, four nights per week at 6.30pm, immediately prior to Bellbird and the 7pm news bulletin.

Although it was long thought that most of this priceless material had been erased – much like the BBC, an "economy drive" undertaken in the late 1970s led to the erasure of large amounts of videotaped material, including most of the first two years of Countdown. However, extensive archival research within the ABC following the closure of the old Gore Hill studios in Sydney revealed that, although some early videotape-only content was erased, much of the primary footage had been shot on film and most of it was retained.

In the early years of television, the ABC had been using Lissajous figures as fillers in-between programs. A staff competition was conducted in 1963 to create a new logo. Graphic designer Bill Kennard submitted a design in 1965 which was part of the waveform of an oscilloscope. Kennard was paid £25 for his design, and it was officially adopted on 1 May 1964.

In 1967, the weeknightly television current affairs program, This Day Tonight, and its counterpart on radio, PM, were introduced. The ABC also focused on producing radio and television talk programs that explored a wide range of national and international issues. Prominent among these was The Science Show, which began in 1975, hosted by Robyn Williams. In the same year radio program, Coming out ready or not (later known simply as The Coming Out Show), produced by the Australian Women's Broadcasting Cooperative, launched, dealing with women's issues.

The ABC also opened a number of new overseas news bureaux – new offices were opened in Jakarta and Kuala Lumpur in 1964, New Delhi and Tokyo in 1966, Washington in 1967, and Bangkok in 1972. Radio Australia also broadcast special news bulletins to Australian and New Zealand armed forces in Vietnam, with 20 correspondents covering the conflict between 1965 and 1972.

The number of commissioners was increased once again in 1967 to nine. In 1975 the Whitlam government introduced, without legislation, a staff elected commissioner position, subsequently discontinued by the Fraser government. Another amendment to the Act was passed in 1976 which raised the number of commissioners to eleven. In addition to mandating a commissioner from each state, it required two women to be on the commission.

2JJ banner from 1975

In 1975, colour television was introduced in Australia. Within a decade, the ABC had moved into satellite broadcasting, enhancing its ability to distribute content nationally. In the same year, the ABC introduced a 24-hour-a-day AM rock station in Sydney, 2JJ (Double Jay), which was eventually expanded into the national Triple J FM network. A classical music network was established a year later on the FM band, broadcasting from Adelaide. It was initially known as ABC-FM – referring both to its "fine music" programming and radio frequency.

In 1973, New South Wales Rugby League boss Kevin Humphreys negotiated the rugby league's first television deal with the ABC. The first ABC Shop opened in 1974.

ABC budget cuts began in 1976 and continued until 1985. In 1978, the ABC NSW Staff Association organised a strike against budget cuts and political interference. Sydney ABC was off air for four days. A packed free concert in support was held at the Regent Theatre and compered by Bob Hudson. It featured Fred Dagg and Robyn Archer. In 1991, Tom Molomby wrote:

"The effects of the budget reductions had been so badly handled that the organisation was to remain seriously crippled for years."

== 1980s ==
In 1981, ABC Radio began carrying Aboriginal and Torres Strait Islander broadcasts in Alice Springs and later Northern Queensland, while at the same time comedy and social history units were set up, and news and current affairs output expanded.

Sir Talbot Duckmanton resigned as general manager in 1982, the same year that the commission was host broadcaster for the Commonwealth Games, held in Brisbane. 1982 was also the Australian Broadcasting Commission's fiftieth anniversary, an event celebrated around the country.

The Australian Broadcasting Corporation Act 1983 changed the name of the organisation from the "Australian Broadcasting Commission" to the "Australian Broadcasting Corporation" effective 1 July 1983. At the same time, the newly formed Corporation underwent significant restructuring – program production in Indigenous affairs, comedy, social history and current affairs was significantly expanded, while the corporation's output of drama was boosted. Local production trebled from 1986 to 1991 with the assistance of co-production, co-financing, and pre-sales arrangements.

The changes also resulted in the split of television and radio operations into two separate divisions, with an overhaul of management, finance, property and engineering undertaken. Geoffrey Whitehead was managing director; however, following his resignation in 1986, David Hill (at the time chair of the ABC Board) took over his position.

Teletext services were introduced to ABC-TV in 1983 to allow hearing-impaired viewers access to closed captions. Nationwide, the successor to This Day Tonight, was replaced in turn by a new, hour-long, national news program called The National. Having proved unsuccessful, it reverted to a state ABC News bulletin at 7.00 pm, with a state-based edition of The 7.30 Report following afterwards. Lateline and Media Watch also launched in the 1980s.

New guidelines passed by the ABC Board in 1984 led to increased Australian content on ABC-TV, particularly in prime time. New programs such as The Investigators, Quantum, and Bush Tucker Man were launched to large audiences. Other popular programs included The D Generation, Australia You're Standing In It, The Big Gig, and long-running music program Rage.

A new concert music department was formed in 1985 to coordinate the corporation's six symphony orchestras, which in turn received a greater level of autonomy in order to better respond to local needs. Open-air free concerts and tours, educational activities, and joint ventures with other music groups were undertaken at the time to expand the orchestras' audience reach.

ABC Radio was restructured significantly in 1985 – ABC Radio 1 became the ABC Metropolitan Network, while ABC Radio 2 became known as Radio National (callsigns, however, were not standardised until 1990). New programs such as The World Today, Australia All Over, and The Coodabeen Champions were introduced, while ABC-FM established an Australian Music Unit in 1989. Radio Australia began to focus on the Asia-Pacific region, with coverage targeted at the south west and central Pacific, south-east Asia, and north Asia. Radio Australia also carried more news coverage, with special broadcasts during the 1987 Fijian coups d'état, the Tiananmen Square protests of 1989, and (in the early 1990s) the Gulf War.

A government initiative undertaken in 1987 known as the Second Regional Radio Network established 19 new studios in regional areas (with an additional 16 upgraded), as well as approximately 300 additional transmitters. At the same time, Radio National and ABC-FM were expanded into these areas.

In August 1988 the Parliamentary Broadcast Network (PBN), was established under the National Metropolitan Radio Plan, as a dedicated network to carry the ABC's mandatory Parliamentary broadcasts on AM transmitters in each state capital as well as Newcastle and Canberra.

== 1990s ==
The 1990s also saw the expansion of the ABC's network of ABC shops, which sell a wide range of program-related merchandise, including books, CDs and DVDs. During the same decade, ABC Online was established as a complement to the organisation's broadcasting endeavours, providing transcripts, podcasts, and other related material. Triple J, meanwhile, had grown to cover all state capitals in addition to Darwin, Canberra and Newcastle.

Increasing pressure throughout the 1980s led the ABC to divest its orchestras in 1990. It formed Symphony Australia, an umbrella organisation that coordinates the now independent state-based orchestras (still owned by the ABC). The Sydney Symphony Orchestra was the first to be corporatised in 1996 when Sydney Symphony Orchestra Holdings Pty Ltd was formed.

In Melbourne, the ABC Southbank Centre was completed in 1994, and now houses the radio division in Victoria as well as the Melbourne Symphony Orchestra.

The ABC Multimedia Unit was established in July 1995, to manage the new ABC website (launched in August). Funding was allocated later that year specifically for online content, as opposed to reliance on funding for television and radio content. The first online election coverage was put together in 1996, and included news, electorate maps, candidate information and live results.

By the early 1990s, all major ABC broadcasting outlets moved to 24-hour-a-day operation, while regional radio coverage in Australia was extended with 80 new transmitters. Live television broadcasts of selected parliamentary sessions started in 1990. The Parliamentary and News Network (PNN), forerunner of ABC NewsRadio, was launched in August 1994, adding a rolling news service to the former Parliamentary Broadcast Network. PNN was expanded to Darwin in 1996 to complete its coverage to all capital cities.

Trials for digital radio began in the 1990s, using the popular Eureka 147 standard. At the same time, the majority of operations were upgraded to fully digitised systems for program playout and storage, as well as a word processing system adapted specifically for the needs of the division's news services.

International television service Australia Television International was established in 1993, while at the same Radio Australia increased its international reach. Reduced funding in 1997 for Radio Australia resulted in staff and programming cuts.

ABC-FM relaunched in 1994 as ABC Classic FM, accompanied by major changes to the station's music and programming. In 1995, D-Cart digital technology developed by ABC Radio attracted worldwide interest and was sold to European, North American and Asian markets. The ABC used D-Radio, the first fully digital audio system, for Triple J.

Australia Television was sold to the Seven Network in 1998, however the service continued to show ABC news and current-affairs programming up until its closure in 2001.

== 2000s ==
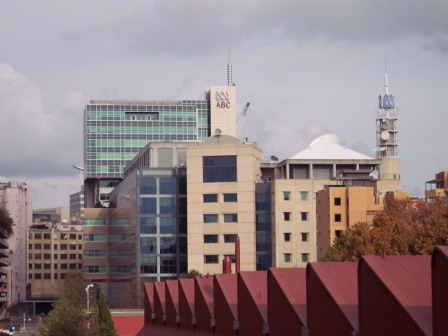
The ABC's Sydney headquarters in Ultimo

The 2001 centenary of the Federation of Australia was celebrated across a number of outlets on 6 May. In the same year, digital television commenced after four years of preparation. In readiness, the ABC had fully digitised its production, post-production and transmission facilities – heralded at the time as 'the greatest advance in television technology since the introduction of colour'. The first programs to be produced in widescreen were drama series Something in the Air, Grass Roots and In the Mind of the Architect.

At the same time, the ABC's Multimedia division was renamed 'ABC New Media', becoming an output division of the ABC alongside Television and Radio. Legislation allowed the ABC to provide 'multichannels' – additional, digital-only, television services managed by the New Media division. Soon after the introduction of digital television in 2001, Fly TV and the ABC Kids channel launched, showing a mix of programming aimed at teenagers and children. The division also experimented with interactive television in 2001, on the Optus Television subscription platform.

In July 2002, to celebrate ABC's 70th anniversary, the corporation launched a new logo across all media. Also, 3 new television idents are created for ABC TV to feature a silver ring transforming to the ABC logo.

In 2002, the ABC launched ABC Asia Pacific – the replacement for the defunct Australia Television channel operated previously by the Seven Network. Much like its predecessor, and companion radio network Radio Australia, the service provided a mix of programming targeted at audiences throughout the Asia-Pacific region. Funding cuts in 2003, meanwhile, led to the closure of Fly and the ABC Kid's Channel.

Meanwhile, ABC Radio continued to upgrade its studio and transmitter facilities. The ABC attracted large audiences for its non-commercial radio coverage of the 2000 Summer Olympics, with a range of programming across its various networks. All networks celebrated 100 years of radio in 2001 with special broadcasts marking the event and a limited edition CD released, with highlights of the ABC's output since 1932.

ABC NewsRadio began to continue its news programming online while its radio network broadcast parliament in 2002 – amongst the first of the corporation's radio networks to offer live, exclusive, streaming online. The service also expanded into the Gold Coast – the first new coverage area for the network in five years. The ABC launched a digital radio service, ABC DiG, in November 2002, available though the Internet and digital television, but not available through any other terrestrial broadcast until DAB+ became available in 2009.

In 2003, former Communications Minister Senator Richard Alston lodged 68 complaints with the Independent Complaints Review Panel against ABC's AM radio program for its coverage of the US-led invasion of Iraq. The panel upheld 17 of the lodged complaints, overall finding no evidence of biased and anti-Coalition coverage. Of the 17 complaints by the Minister that were upheld, 12 displayed serious bias on the part of the reporters or the program's presenter Linda Mottram. In 2003 the ABC's Sydney operations moved from Gore Hill to new building built by Leighton Contractors in Ultimo.

ABC Family, a second attempt at a digital-only television channel, launched on 7 March 2005. Unlike its predecessors the new service was not dependent on government funding, instead running on a budget of $3 million per year. Minister for Communications Helen Coonan inaugurated the channel at Parliament House three days later. Genre restrictions limiting the types of programming the channel could carry were lifted in October 2006 – ABC Family was henceforth able to carry programming classified as comedy, drama, national news, sport and entertainment.

In 2006, a revised and updated version of Ken Inglis' 1983 history of the ABC, This is the ABC – 1932–1983, was published by Black Inc., entitled Whose ABC? The Australian Broadcasting Corporation 1983–2006.

A restructure of the ABC board, undertaken in 2006 by the Howard government, abolished the position of staff-elected director. The elected director was previously nominated and elected by employees of the ABC. Nominees for this director office were to have been employed at least 24 hours a week by the ABC and the term of office was two years with eligibility for re-election to a second term. An elected director was not eligible for a third term of office. This move drew criticism from the Labor Party, Australian Greens, and the Democrats, who saw it as a 'revenge measure' taken against the corporation. In the same year, managing director Mark Scott formally released a new set of editorial guidelines covering news and current affairs, opinion programs, factual programs and performance pieces. The ABC must express "a full range of views in opinion-based programs and ensure that when an opinion is expressed, it is clearly marked as an opinion". The guidelines came into effect in March 2007.

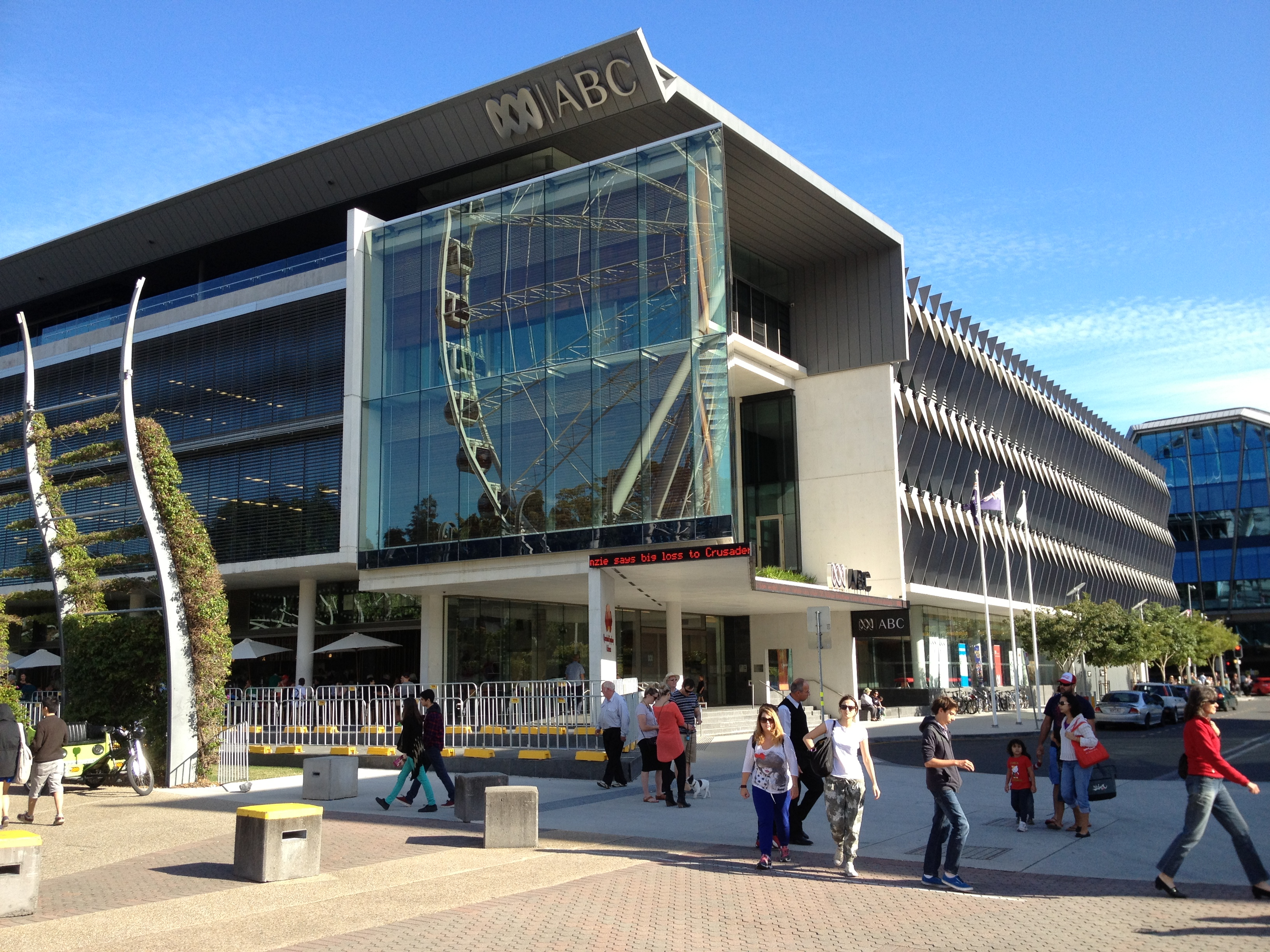
ABC Building, South Bank, Brisbane, 2013

A high incidence of breast cancer in female staff working at the ABC's offices in the Brisbane suburb of Toowong led to the closure of the site in December 2006, with TV and radio operations being moved to alternative locations around the city. The ABC's Managing Director, Mark Scott, announced in August 2007 that new studios would be built on the site, following the final release of the Review and Scientific Investigation Panel's report. However, in January 2012 the staff were moved into purpose-built accommodation in Brisbane's South Bank.

In the lead up to the 2007 federal election, the Howard government endorsed a proposal submitted to the Australian Communications & Media Authority by the ABC to launch a second digital channel targeted at children. The new channel, titled ABC Entertains, would aim to provide at least 50% Australian-made content. On 8 February 2008, ABC TV was rebranded as ABC1, and a new channel for children, ABC Entertains, was funded and announced by the Rudd government in June.

ABC iview, an online video-on-demand service, launched in 2007 as ABC Playback. It was renamed ABC iview in July 2008, it allows viewers to watch shows from ABC and ABC Family, as well as news updates and previews from the ABC Shop. The service offers full-screen video through a Flash-based interface, building on the 55 shows already podcasted or released online.

ABC Entertains and ABC News moved to new digital channels in 2009.

== 2010s ==
ABC News, a dedicated news channel, was launched on 22 July 2010, It became the ABC's fifth domestic TV channel and the fourth launched within the previous 10 years.

On 20 July 2014, ABC1 reverted to its original name of ABC TV. In October 2014, the ABC ran its first "Mental As" week focusing on improving awareness of mental health issues, as part of Mental Health Week.

In November 2014, a cut of A$254 million to funding over the following five years meant that the ABC would have to shed about 10% of its staff, around 400 people. There were several programming changes, with regional and local programming losing out to national programs, and the Adelaide TV production studio had to close (apart from news and current affairs). ABC websites were cut, along with state-based sports broadcasting and the state editions of 7.30. A new Digital Network Division would oversee online operations, and the Regional Division was promised.

In December 2015, it was announced that former BSkyB (UK), Star TV (Hong Kong), and Google executive Michelle Guthrie would take over from managing director Mark Scott, who was to retire in April 2016.

ABC3 was rebranded as ABC ME in 2016. Also in that year, the ABC's coverage of the issue of sexual abuse in the Catholic Church won praise, including the awarding of the Melbourne Press Club 2016 Quill for Coverage of an Issue or Event for the report George Pell and Sexual Abuse in the Catholic Church, and the 2016 Golden Quill award to Louise Milligan and Andy Burns for their extensive coverage of Cardinal George Pell's evidence given at the Royal Commission into Institutional Responses to Child Sexual Abuse.

In November 2016, the ABC announced that ABC News 24 and ABC NewsRadio would be rebranded under a unified ABC News brand. The relaunch occurred on 10 April 2017.

In August 2017, refurbished premises in the Melbourne Arts Precinct in Southbank were opened, incorporating both TV and radio teams. Occupying four floors, the offices include 5 TV studios, 19 radio studios, extensive production facilities and a sound and film archive. Studio 31, known as the Ripponlea studio (although situated in Gordon Street in the adjoining suburb of Elsternwick in Melbourne) and nicknamed "The Dream Factory", closed in November 2017, with the new state-of-the-art Studio 31 relocated to the Southbank ABC Centre.

Between July 2017 and June 2018, the "Regional Connecting Communities" program was launched, which provided funding for increased jobs in the regions, as well as more resources for local news, weather and live reporting. Also during this financial year, the whole of the ABC underwent an organisational restructure, after which the Radio and Television Divisions were no longer separate entities each under a director, instead being split across several functional divisions, with different teams producing different genres of content for television, radio and digital platforms. The Entertainment & Specialist (E&S) team focussed on comedy, kids' programs, drama, Indigenous-related programs, music, other entertainment and factual content; the new ABC Specialist team created content across the arts, science, religion & ethics, education and society & culture; while the Regional & Local team focussed on regional and local content.

In June 2018, the Liberal Party's annual federal council voted to privatise the ABC. The decision is not binding on the federal government, so is seen as unlikely to impact government policy.

Around 23 September 2018, Guthrie was sacked from her role as managing director, and David Anderson stepped in as the acting managing director, initially as a temporary measure. A leadership crisis ensued after allegations arose that ABC Chair, Justin Milne, had, according to the MEAA, engaged in "overt political interference in the running of the ABC that is in clear breach of the ABC charter and the role of the chairperson" by interfering in editorial and staffing matters. After pressure for an independent inquiry or statement from Milne, or his resignation, following meetings by ABC staff in various locations, on 27 September Milne resigned.

In February 2019, after the roles of ABC chair and managing director had been vacant for over four months, Ita Buttrose was named chair. Buttrose named the acting managing director, David Anderson as the official managing director in May 2019.

Coverage of the lead-up to Cardinal Pell's 2018–19 trials and subsequent acquittal in 2020 was criticised by prominent Catholics, including Pell himself, and conservative commentators, such as Paul Kelly, Greg Craven, Gerard Henderson and Greg Sheridan.

On 5 June 2019, Australian Federal Police (AFP) raided the headquarters of the ABC looking for articles written in 2017 about alleged misconduct by Australian special forces in Afghanistan, later dubbed the Afghan Files. Search warrants naming two journalists and news director Gaven Morris were issued. The raid was countered by lawyers for the ABC in litigation against the AFP, challenging the examination of over 9,200 documents, including internal emails. In February 2020 the case was dismissed by the federal court. In June 2020, the AFP sent a brief of evidence to the Commonwealth Director of Public Prosecutions (CDPP), the federal public prosecutor, recommending charges be laid against journalist Dan Oakes for breaking the Afghan Files story, but in October 2020, the CDPP dropped the case. This raid, along with another AFP raid on the home of News Corp journalist Annika Smethurst in the same month, became the subject of a Senate inquiry by the Environment and Communications References Committee on press freedom. The final report, published in May 2021, made 17 recommendations, including proposed reforms to laws that have the potential to criminalise public interest journalism, as well as proposals to improve federal protections for whistleblowers.

== 2020s ==
In June 2020, the ABC announced it needed to cut 250 jobs, a number of programs, and reduce its travel and production budgets after the Morrison government cut its budget by A$84 million following multi-year indexation freezes. Existing television and radio channels would remain, but transmission cuts would occur in the future. Radio news would be cut back and ABC Life would be rebranded as ABC Local, and most staff would be moving outside of Sydney.

Also in June 2020, ABC TV's flagship Sunday morning current affairs program Insiders received criticism regarding a lack of diversity when it became apparent the program had likely never had a non-white person on its panel in its history. Subsequently, Indigenous Affairs editor Bridget Brennan became the first person of colour to appear on the show when she was invited onto the program, a week after an all-white panel had discussed the Black Lives Matter movement.

In 2021, the former Attorney-General in the Morrison government, Christian Porter, sued the ABC for defamation over an article written by Louise Milligan about an historic rape allegation. Porter discontinued the action in May 2021.

In June 2021, the ABC partnered with First Nations Media Australia, with the two organisations sharing knowledge and staff to bring more Indigenous voices and stories to Australian media over a period of 12 months. The partnership is part of the ABC's overall "Elevate" Reconciliation Action Plan (RAP), which also includes a project to focus on Indigenous sport on ABC Digital Radio. In November 2022, Suzanne Dredge was appointed as the first Head of Indigenous News at the ABC.

In June 2021, the ABC announced its plan to move around 300 staff to offices in Parramatta, in a plan which would see 75% of journalists and producers moving out of the Ultimo building by 2025 in order to reduce costs. Rental from some of the vacant space in the city centre would earn additional income to offset the ongoing effects of the significant funding cuts since 2014 and the recent indexation freeze.

An AM report broadcast on 31 January 2023 regarding a town meeting that had been held in Alice Springs to address youth crime in the town prompted a number of complaints from listeners. Complainants took issue with the impartiality of the report, particularly suggestions that there had been elements of white supremacy at the meeting. The Ombudsman's Office upheld 19 complaints, finding the AM report had breached impartiality standards. The story was re-edited, an editor's note attached and the error acknowledged on the "Corrections and Clarifications" webpage. David Anderson later admitted during a Senate Estimates hearing that there had been a failure in the ABC's processes during production, and did not contain the necessary perspectives for a balanced report.

In April 2023, criticism was levelled at the ABC, including by its own Media Watch program, for seemingly ignoring a legitimate news story about the conduct of independent senator Lidia Thorpe. Thorpe had been caught engaged in an altercation with members of the public outside a Melbourne strip club in the early hours of 16 April 2023. Despite it being covered by many other media outlets, the ABC largely ignored the story until several days later when it published an online story on 19 April 2023 after prime minister Anthony Albanese urged Thorpe to seek help. Media Watch host Paul Barry described the ABC's decision not to report the story earlier as "pathetic".

The ABC was widely criticised in May 2023 for deciding to commence its live coverage of the Coronation of Charles III and Camilla by holding a largely anti-monarchy panel discussion instead of reporting directly on the event as it got underway in London. The Coronation: A discussion about the Monarchy in 2023 was hosted by Jeremy Fernandez and Julia Baird and featured anti-monarchists Stan Grant, Craig Foster and Teela Reid as well as monarchist Julian Leeser. Much time was spent during the discussion criticising the monarchy and the affect the institution has had on First Nations Australians.

In 2024, ABC controversially sacked journalist Antoinette Lattouf. A group known as Lawyers for Israel had advocated for the ABC to fire her, after Lattouf shared a post from Human Rights Watch critical of Israel.

On 25 March 2026, a pay dispute led to ABC staff going on strike for 24 hours. The staff were offered a 3.5% pay rise and 3.25% in the proceeding two years, which was below inflation. During the strike, emergency broadcasts would continue, and some BBC World Service content would be broadcast instead of regular programming.

== See also ==
- ABC Digital Network Division (formerly ABC Innovation)
- ABC Television
- History of ABC Radio (Australia)
- History of broadcasting in Australia
- Television broadcasting in Australia
- Television in Australia

== Notes and references ==
Notes
