= Suzanne Dredge =

Australian journalist

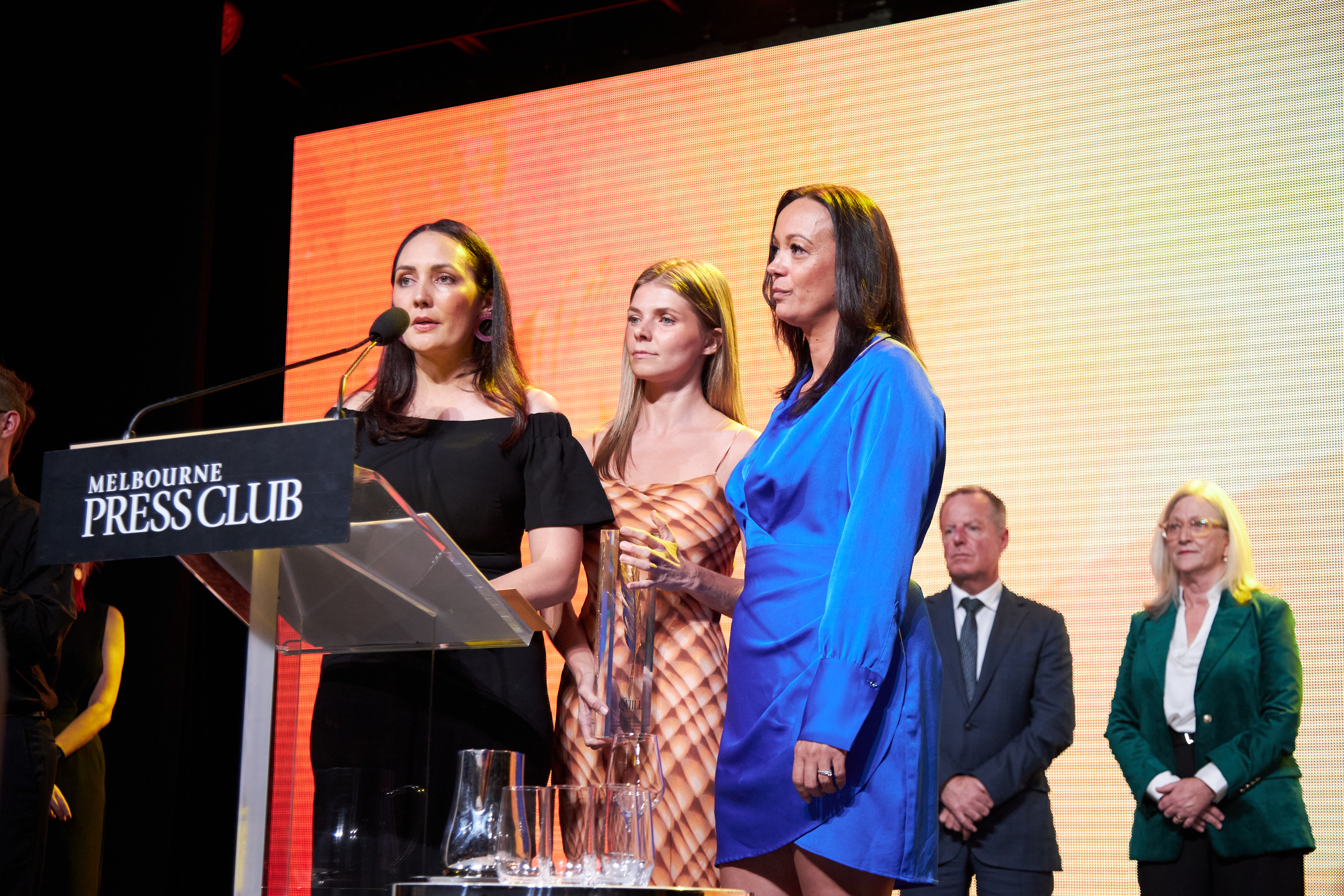
- Bridget Brennan, Brooke Fryer and Suzanne Dredge (right foreground) receiving a Melbourne Press Club award
- Education: Western Sydney University (BComm)
- Occupation: journalist
- Years active: 2011 to present
- Known for: Becoming the first Head of Indigenous News at the Australian Broadcasting Corporation
- Television: 7.30, Four Corners

Suzanne Dredge is an Australian multi-Walkley Award and Gold Quill-winning journalist.

She is the Australian Broadcasting Corporation's Head of International & Indigenous News. Dredge is a Wiradjuri woman.

== Early life ==
Dredge grew up in the western suburbs of Sydney. Her mother raised Dredge and her three siblings by herself, living in public housing and working in a factory. Dredge has said some of her "fondest memories" were of her father taking her and her siblings out onto country. He taught them how to live off the land and find food and water, while connecting them back to their culture and to country.

Dredge dropped out of school at 16. By the age of 23, she was a mother of three children and was in a violent relationship. After deciding to leave the relationship at the age of 24, Dredge enrolled in a course at TAFE where she studied youth work.

== Career ==
After working as a youth worker and encountering a range of social issues affecting marginalised communities, Dredge was reminded of her childhood ambitions of becoming a journalist to expose social injustice.

In 2010, she enrolled as a mature age student at Western Sydney University in a Bachelor of Communications majoring in journalism, becoming the first person in her family to attend university. She graduated in 2013.

While at university, she applied for internships and pitched stories to local newspapers which resulted in Dredge having a front-page story in the local Macarthur newspaper. She also obtained a job with Koori Radio where she worked from 2012 to 2013, producing the station's talkback program Blackchat.

Dredge joined the Australian Broadcasting Corporation in 2011 as an intern before becoming a researcher with the national reporting team. in 2013

She then worked as a producer for ABC Investigations and as a supervising producer on 7.30, while also overseeing the program's indigenous coverage. Dredge's reports for ABC Investigations on 7.30 and Four Corners saw Dredge travel to the Middle East on various high risk assignments. Her reporting in the Middle East included covering Islamic State and investigating Australians who fought with al-Qaeda-linked groups in Iraq and Syria.

In 2022, Dredge was the first person to ever be appointed to Head of Indigenous News at the ABC, to lead an Indigenous reporting team who were given a remit to amplify and expand the ABC's coverage of Indigenous issues including the proposed Indigenous Voice to Parliament.

In 2023, the ABC received criticism from Q+A host Stan Grant (son of Wiradjuri elder Stan Grant) about the lack of diversity during the coverage of the 2023 New South Wales state election, which included an all-white panel on election night. In response, the ABC's news director Justin Stevens admitted the organisation needed to continue making improvements in achieving diversity but highlighted Dredge's appointment, and that of Dan Bourchier as the Indigenous Voice to Parliament correspondent, as examples of progress the ABC was making.

== Awards ==
Dredge has been recognised with a number of awards throughout her career including three Walkley Awards.

At the 2015 Walkley Awards, Dredge (along with Matt Brown and Mathew Marsic) won the Walkley for Best TV/AV Daily Current Affairs for the 7.30 story "Enslaved by Aussie Jihadis."

In 2019, Dredge (along with reporter Dylan Welch, cinematographer David Maguire and producer Janine Cohen) won the Walkey Award in the Television/Video: Current Affairs Long category for the report "Orphans of ISIS".

Also in 2019, Dredge (along with Sean Rubinsztein-Dunlop and Lesley Robinson) won the Les Kennedy Award at the Kennedy Awards for Outstanding Crime Reporting.

In 2020, Dredge (along with reporter Dylan Welch, visual journalist Alex Palmer and digital journalist Clare Blumer) won the Walkley Award in the All Media: Innovation category for "Anatomy of a suicide bombing".

Dredge, part of the first female Indigenous Four Corners reporting team, won the Gold Quill at the 2023 Quill Awards for their investigation into the issue of femicide experienced by First Nations women in Australia, with a report entitled "How many more?". Dredge along with Bridget Brennan, Brooke Fryer and Stephanie Zillman also won the Quill Award for Excellence in Indigenous Affairs reporting for their work.
