= ABT (TV station) =

Television station in Hobart, Tasmania, Australia

- Hobart, Tasmania; Australia
- Channels: Digital: 8 (VHF); Virtual: 2

Programming
- Language: English
- Affiliations: ABC Television

Ownership
- Owner: Australian Broadcasting Corporation

History
- First air date: 4 June 1960
- Former channel number: Analog: 2 (VHF) (1960–2013)

Technical information
- Licensing authority: Australian Communications and Media Authority
- ERP: 50 kW
- HAAT: 1042 m
- Transmitter coordinates: 42°53′51″S 147°14′10″E

Links
- Website: www.abc.net.au/tv/

ABT is the call sign of a television station operated by the publicly-owned Australian Broadcasting Corporation, with a transmission area covering southern Tasmania. ABT began broadcasting on VHF channel 2 on 4 June 1960, with studios in inner-city Hobart and transmitter at Mount Wellington. The "AB" in the call sign stands for "Australian Broadcasting", as in Australian Broadcasting Commission (now Australian Broadcasting Corporation). The "T" in the call sign stands for Tasmania.

As in other Australian states, the ABC television station in the state's capital city relays programs to a network of region-based transmitters: in the case of Tasmania, ABNT for northern Tasmania (transmitter located on Mt Barrow) and ABKT for King Island (transmitter located on Gentle Annie Hill). Whilst their callsigns imply that they are standalone television stations, they have only ever operated as relays from ABT.

As well as these two nominal stations transmitting programs from ABT, there is an extensive network of translator stations performing the same function. Their purpose is to provide improved signal reception in areas with poor or no reception from Mount Wellington. They pick up the on-air signal from the Mount Wellington transmitter and re-broadcast it on another channel (to prevent cross interference which would arise from two transmitters in different locations transmitting the same program). The broken terrain and scattered population of Tasmania has necessitated a relatively large number of translator stations, even within the Hobart urban area e.g. Taroona.

== History ==
ABT was the first television station to transmit in Tasmania, although from 1956, with the beginning of television transmission in Melbourne, it was possible along the northern coast of Tasmania, in favourable meteorological conditions, to receive television signals from Mount Dandenong, immediately east of Melbourne.

Until the completion of microwave links between Melbourne and Hobart, ABT operated as a standalone station, but with the completion of the microwave links, it increasingly shared programming with the national ABC television network. However some locally-produced programming still occurs e.g. Collectors, which was produced in Hobart from 2005 to 2011.

The original tower and transmitter for ABT on Mount Wellington were replaced in 1997 due to frequent signal failure due to icing of the transmitter elements, caused by meteorological conditions. The replacement transmitter, which necessitated a new tower to support it, is protected by a large protective cylinder which is opaque but through which radio signals are able to pass.

The analogue signal for ABT on channel 2 was shut off on 9 April 2013. Since this time only a digital signal in the UHF band has been transmitted.

== ABC Television in Tasmania today ==
=== Relay stations ===
The following stations relay ABT:

Call	Region served	City	Channels (Analog/ digital)	First air date	3rd letter's meaning	ERP (Analog/ digital)	HAAT (Analog/ digital)^{1}	Transmitter coordinates	Transmitter location
ABKT	King Island	King Island	11 (VHF)^{3} 57 (UHF)	14 January 1972	King Island	2.6 kW; 6.5 kW	190 m 198 m	40°2′11″S 144°1′0″E	Gentle Annie
ABNT	North Eastern Tasmania	Launceston	32 (UHF)^{23} 41 (UHF)	29 July 1963	North Eastern	2000 kW; 1250 kW	847 m 847 m	41°23′30″S 147°25′36″E	Mount Barrow

Notes:

- 1. HAAT estimated from http://www.itu.int/SRTM3/ using EHAAT.
- 2. ABNT was on VHF channel 3 from its 1963 sign-on until 2002, moving to its current channel in order to accommodate FM radio.
- 3. Analogue television services ceased operation 9 April 2013 as part of the national conversion to digital television.

As of 2021 there is a large number of transmitters broadcasting a number of ABC channels.

=== Local programming ===
ABC News Tasmania is presented by Guy Stayner on weeknights and Sabra Lane on weekends, with weeknight bulletins also incorporate national finance segment presented by David Chau in Sydney. The half hour bulletin is produced in Hobart and airs at 7pm each night.

== See also ==
- History of the Australian Broadcasting Corporation
- Television broadcasting in Australia
