= Mahboba's Promise =

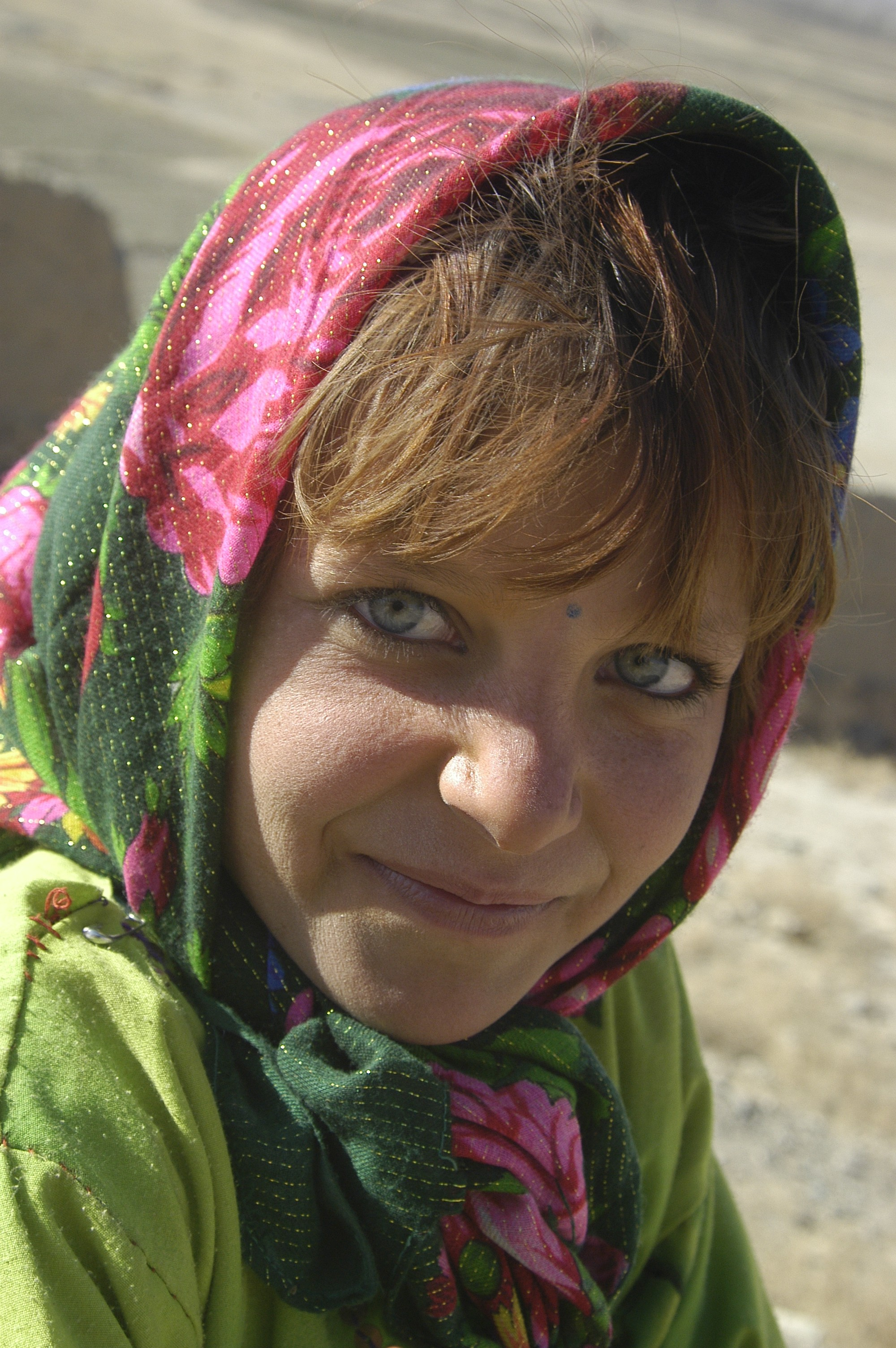
An Afghan girl in a Kabul orphanage.

Mahboba's Promise is an Australian non-profit organisation dedicated to helping the women and the large number of orphaned children of Afghanistan. It is one of the few non-governmental organisations operational in that war-torn nation entirely funded by private donations and currently looks after over 4,000 women and orphans through 90 projects. The organisation has partnered with UNICEF in the region.

== Background ==
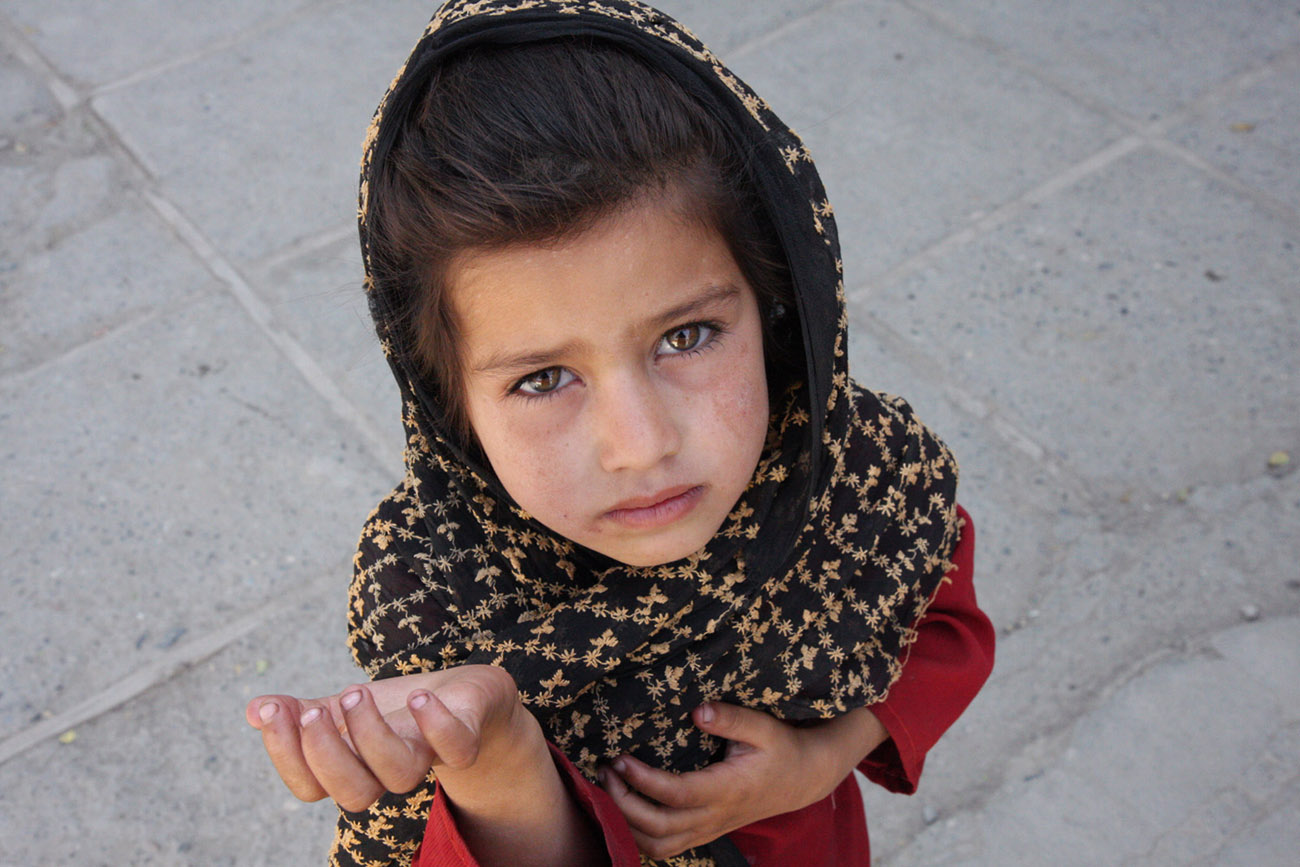
Afghan girl begging in Kabul.

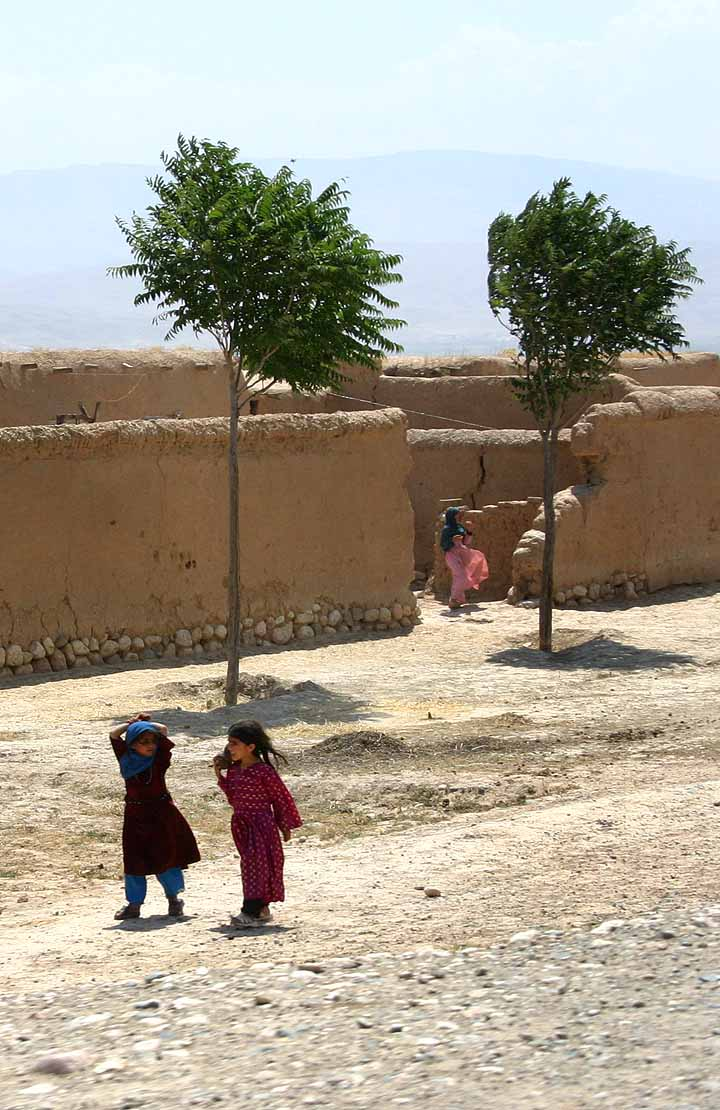
Afghan children, Afghanistan 2005.

At the age of 14, hunted down for being a student activist, Mahboba Rawi hid from the occupying Soviet soldiers in an underground Kabul basement for 20 days. She then fled Afghanistan, crossing the Khyber Pass on foot, arriving at a Pakistan refugee camp hungry and frightened.

Mahboba began the project to help Afghan orphans in 1998 with a small donation in the lounge room of her rented home in Sydney's North Ryde. After the tragic death of her own son, Mahboba slowly pieced her life together by helping other Afghan women, pioneering English classes and even a learn to swim program. A letter from a young Afghan doctor begging for help to save refugee orphans dying on the streets of Kabul encouraged Mahboba and her friends to raise $120.00 that day. To prove the orphans had received the money, the young doctor sent back the children's fingerprints.

The organisation Mahboba's Promise was established as the result of a promise Mahboba made that she would continue to help the orphans of Afghanistan for the rest of her life and she would make people in Australia and the world aware of their suffering and what could be done for them. Since 2001 she has been an active member of Sydney's Afghan community, running English classes for immigrants. Once a refugee herself, Mahboba is still in contact with relatives who've fled to the camps of Pakistan.

The organisation became well known in Australia as the result of a visit to Kabul by Australian Broadcasting Corporation (ABC) journalist Virginia Haussegger. It is also the subject of a film.

== Nature of the organisation ==
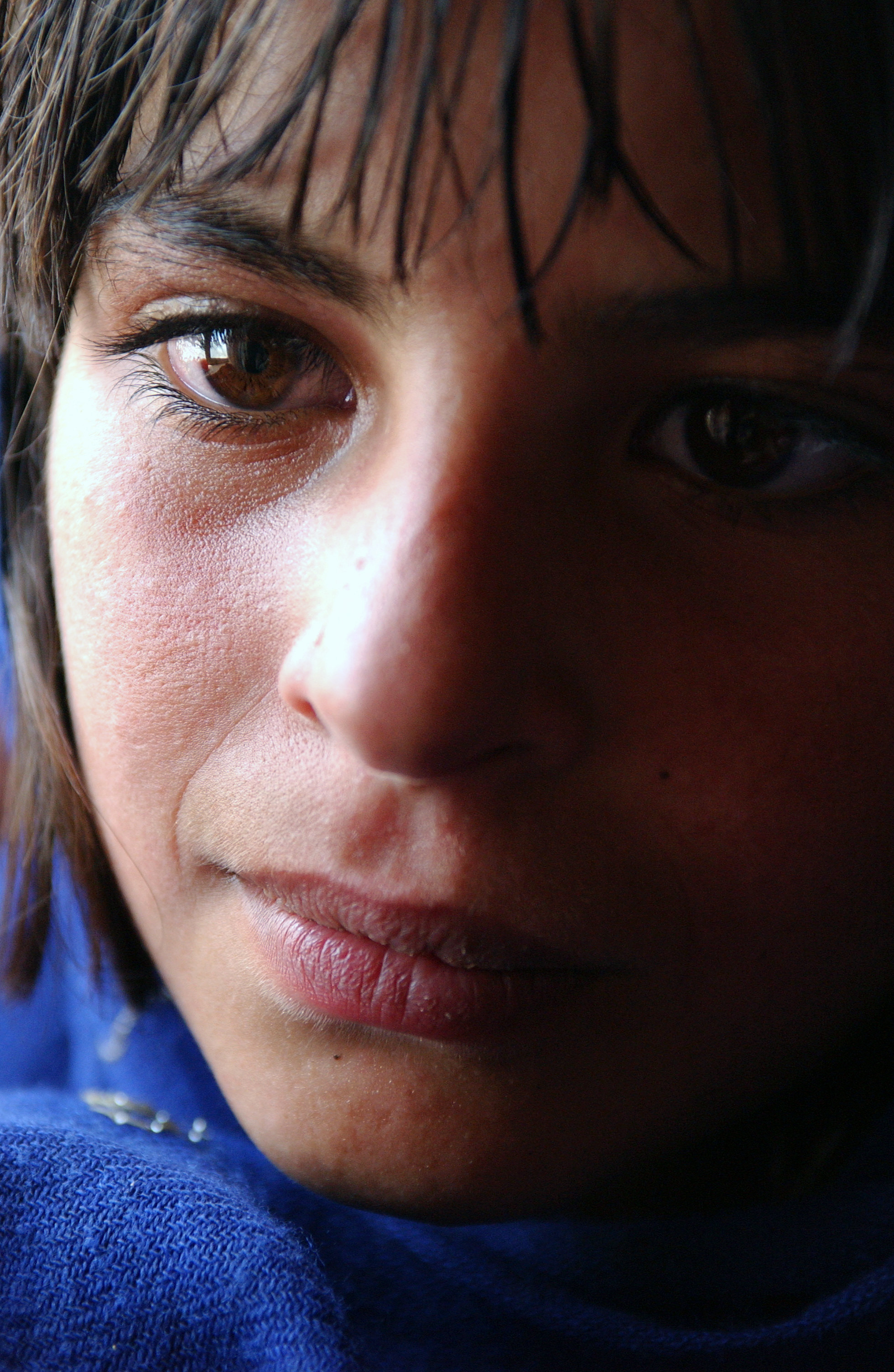
Afghan girl from the Pashtun tribe in Kabul, Afghanistan 2002.

Mahboba's Promise is funded entirely by voluntary donations (no government funding). Funds are sent each month to Afghanistan where Mahboba’s Promise is a registered NGO. Financial reports are received back from the field and receipts are kept at the Hope House office for inspection. The Afghanistan Independent Human Rights Commission and other agencies refer destitute orphans to the organisation for practical and emotional support. Mahboba's Promise is a signatory to the Code of Conduct of ACFID, The Australian Council for International Development and Mahboba's Promise NGO in Kabul is an observer member of ACBAR, The Agency Coordinating Body for Afghan Relief.

In 2009 Mahboba's Promise opened a medical centre staffed by a local doctor and dentist to provide medical and dental care for Hope House orphans and widows, as well as the local community. Main concerns for the children have been skin problems, including scabies and fungal infections as well as leishmaniasis caused by a sand fly bite. Hearing and gum problems are also prevalent. The recently opened Handicraft Artisan Training Centre in Panjshir Valley has been well attended by widows eager to learn a skill so they can make money to support their children. In 2010 five solar hot water heaters were donated by Conergy Australia and after several months spent negotiating their transport, these have been installed on the roof of the Community Centre. This frees up money which had been budgeted for buying wood to heat the water, because even in the summertime, the water from the local well is extremely cold.

== Recognition ==
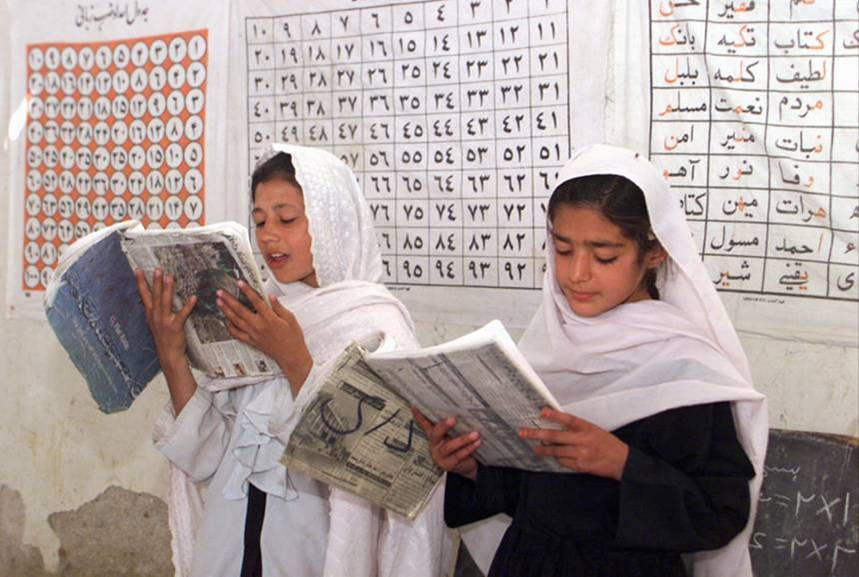
Afghan girls reading, 2007.

Mahboba's Promise is the only independent Australian charity working in Afghanistan. Its staff have local knowledge of the languages, culture and needs of the Afghan people. Many other not-for-profit organizations have been forced to leave Afghanistan as with the ongoing war against the Taliban it is an extremely dangerous country for aid workers.

As Virginia Haussegger states: "[Mahboba's] two orphanages in Kabul and her various support programs outside the capital, including a school for 200 girls in the Panjshir Valley, have not only changed lives and saved lives, they have set an example of what is possible."

A 2009 ABC report described Hope House, located on the outskirts of Kabul, as home to 106 orphans.

Mahboba Rawi was awarded the Medal of the Order of Australia in the 2010 Queen's Birthday Honours in recognition of her service to international humanitarian aid in Afghanistan.
