= Virginia Haussegger =

Australian journalist

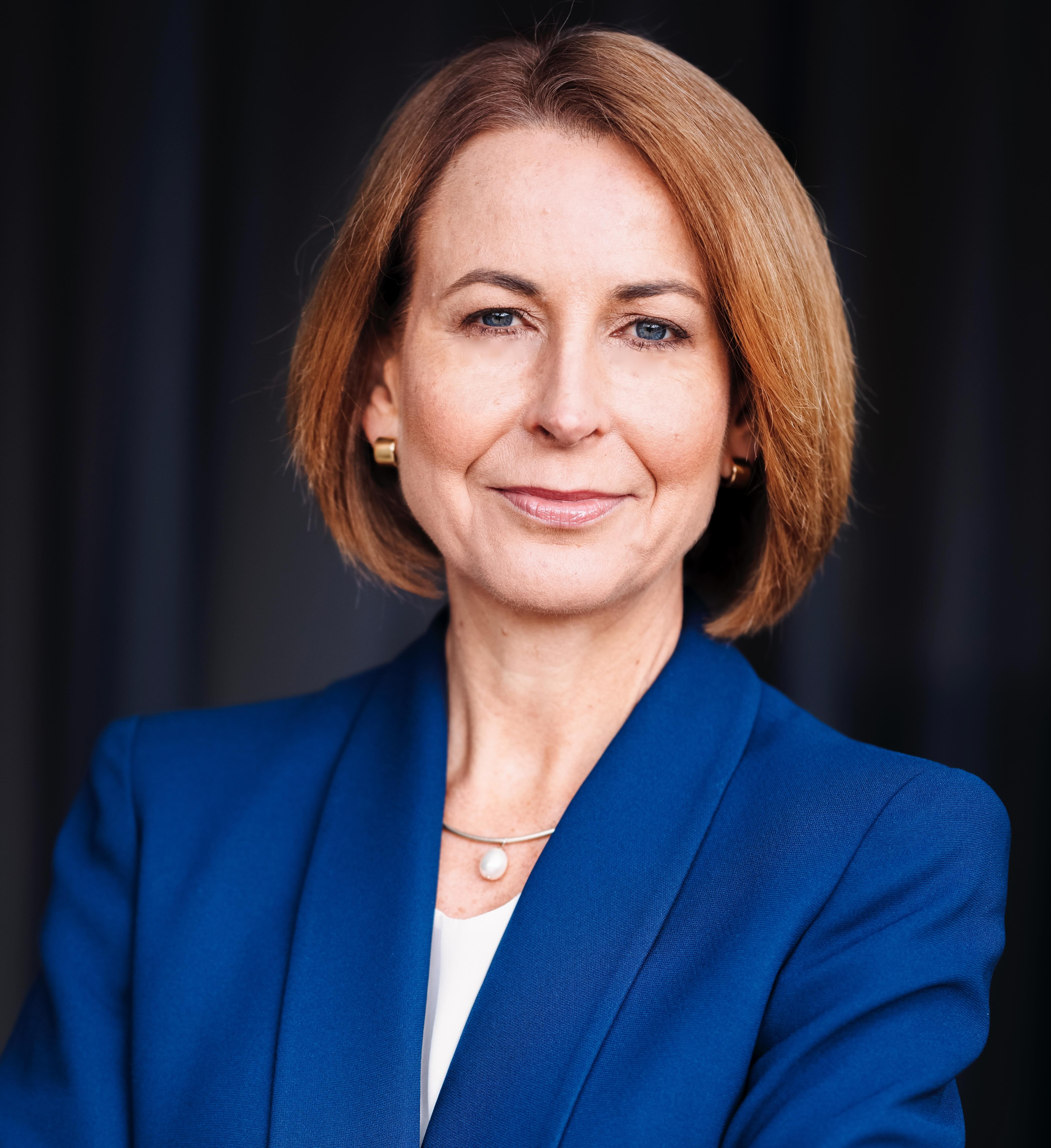
Virginia Haussegger AM Journalist and gender equity advocate, 2021

Virginia Haussegger, AM (born 21 March 1964), is an Australian journalist, academic advocate for gender equity, media commentator and television presenter.

Haussegger presented ABC News on ABC TV in Canberra from 2001 until 2016. She is an adjunct professor at the University of Canberra Institute For Governance and Policy Analysis. In 2018 she was named the ACT's Australian of the Year for 2019. She presents the podcast BroadTalk .

== Career in journalism ==
Haussegger was previously a reporter and presenter of the ABC's national program 7:30 Report, and was a senior reporter at Nine Network and the Seven Network on flagship current affairs programs. In addition to broadcast, she is a columnist and leading commentator on a range of social and gender issues and is published across various Australian media. She was awarded the United Nations Association of Australia Media Peace Prize for her coverage of Indigenous Affairs in 1996.

In September 2016, she announced that she would be leaving ABC News in October to take up a role at the University of Canberra's 50/50 by 2030 Foundation. She has served on numerous boards and committees including the UN Women National Committee Australia, the Snowy Hydro SouthCare Trust, the Australia Forum Steering Committee, the ACT Government's Cultural Facilities Corporation, and Women in Media Canberra. She is also patron of the Canberra Rape Crisis Centre.

== Author ==
Haussegger is the author of Wonder Woman: The Myth of Having it All which examines issues of feminism, fertility and female choice. Her 2025 book Unfinished Revolution: The Feminist Fightback was shortlisted for the Australian Political Book of the Year and longlisted for the 2026 Walkley Book Award.

== BroadTalk podcast ==
Haussegger is the presenter of the podcast BroadTalk. The first 7-part series of BroadTalk in 2020 focused on a 'feminised' style of leadership that emerged during the COVID-19 pandemic and included interviews with Marise Payne, Kate Ellis, and Julia Gillard among others. The second series in 2021 looked at gender equality in individual lives, and included interviews with Julia Banks, Jocelynne Scutt, and others. The third series in 2022 focused on the Australian Federal Election. Season four, also in 2022, focused on Australian women Changemakers, and ties in to an exhibition curated by Haussegger at the Museum of Australian Democracy.

== 50/50 by 2030 Foundation and BroadAgenda ==
Haussegger is the founding Director and former Chair of the 50/50 by 2030 Foundation, which she established at the University of Canberra in 2017. She is also the former Chief Editor of BroadAgenda, a news platform created to shine a gender lens on academic research for a mainstream audience.

== Social issues ==
Haussegger has promoted public awareness of the non-government organisation Mahboba's Promise that assists women, widows and orphans in Afghanistan. She served on the board of UN Women National Committee Australia from late 2010 to 2015.

Haussegger is an adjunct professor at the University of Canberra Institute For Governance and Policy Analysis.

In 2016, Haussegger wrote an article for The Sydney Morning Herald attacking Samantha Armytage, labelling her a "mindless bimbo", saying that "when it comes to the important stuff of the day – the stuff that makes the news – there is a screaming lack of representation of women's knowledge, wisdom and expertise."

== Honours ==
In the 2014 Queen's Birthday Honours, Haussegger was appointed as a Member of the Order of Australia (AM), for "significant service to the community, particularly as an advocate for women's rights and gender equity, and to the media". In October 2018 she was named the ACT's Australian of the Year for 2019.

== Personal life ==
On 15 October 2005, Haussegger married fellow journalist, Mark Kenny, who became the national political editor for Fairfax Media. It was the second marriage for both. Australian National University academic, John Warhurst described them as one of Canberra's most powerful couples. In December 2018 Hausseger wrote about her bowel cancer diagnosis.

Media offices
Preceded by Claudia Emery	ABC News Canberra; Weeknight presenter September 2001 – October 2016	Succeeded by Dan Bourchier
