= Radio Australia =

International broadcasting service of Australia

ABC Australia
- Australia
- Frequencies: FM: Various; satellite; DAB+; online

Programming
- Languages: English, Tok Pisin, French
- Format: News, talk
- Network: ABC Radio

Ownership
- Owner: Australian Broadcasting Corporation

History
- First air date: 20 December 1939; 86 years ago

Links
- Webcast: Live stream
- Website: ABC Asia (Asia–Pacific); ABC Pacific (Pacific)

ABC Radio Australia, also known as Radio Australia, is the international broadcasting and online service operated by the Australian Broadcasting Corporation (ABC), Australia's public broadcaster. Most programming is in English, with some in Tok Pisin.

Radio Australia broadcasts on FM transmitters in seven countries across the Pacific Islands, on DAB+ digital radio in Australia, to the Indo-Pacific region via satellite, and to the rest of world via online streaming.

== History ==
=== Programme Delivery ===
Short-wave services from the Australian Broadcasting Corporation were officially opened in a ceremony by Prime Minister of Australia Robert Menzies on 20 December 1939. One of the functions of Australian shortwave broadcasting was to counter propaganda by the Axis powers, particularly that of Japan. However, the ABC's transmitters were much weaker than the Japanese or German services. The transmitter of AWA near Sydney had 10 kilowatts (kW) of power, and stations VLR and VLW had 2 kW each.

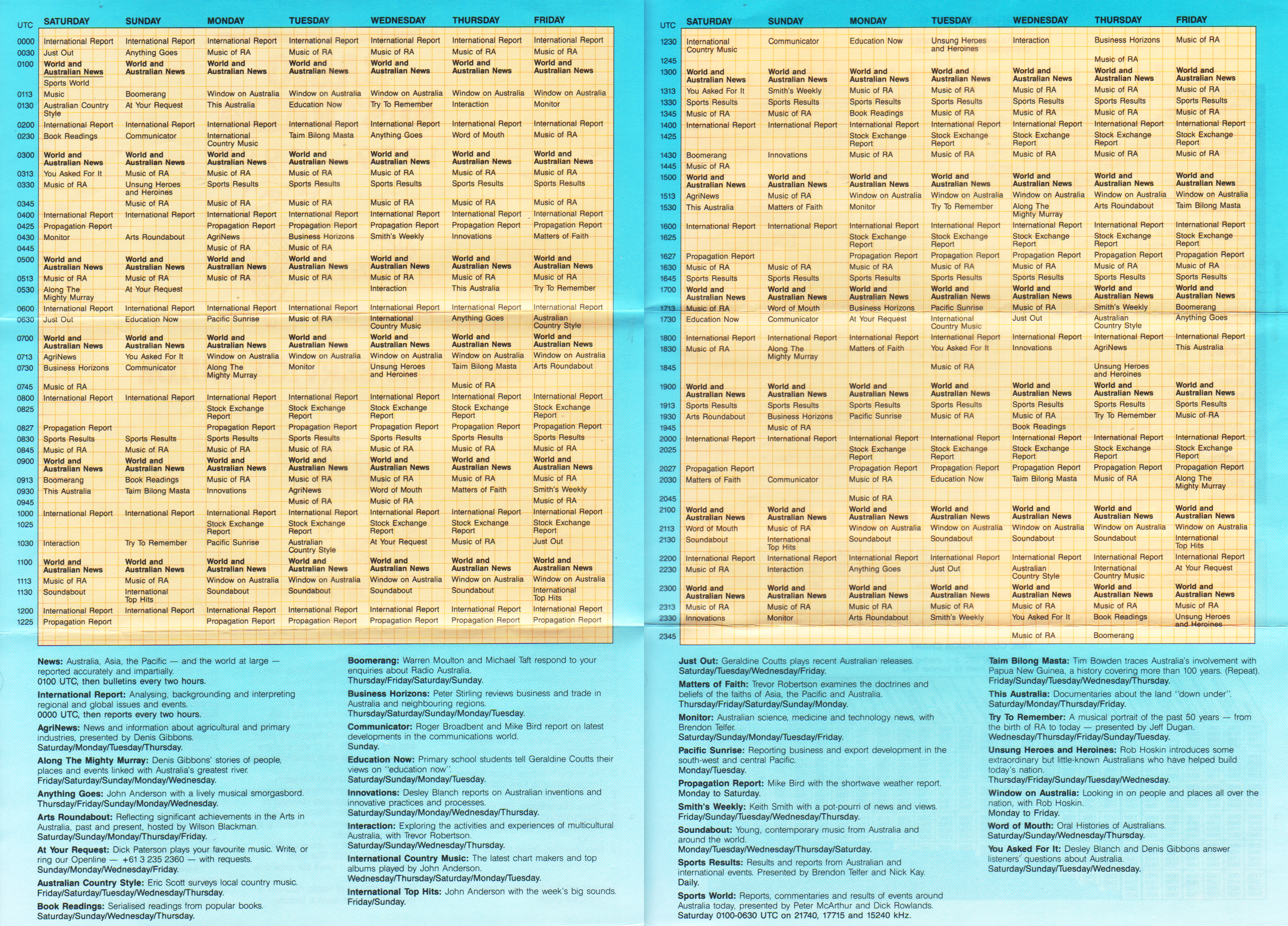
RA English schedule, January 1989

Radio Australia had a considerable range of broadcasts to the Asian region in the 1970s and 1980s, and was hugely popular in China, where the only alternative was the state media controlled by the Chinese Communist Party. During the first Gulf War in 1990/91 the Darwin station provided valuable information and support to expatriate Australians caught in Iraq, and others working in places like Saudi Arabia.

In 1993, the ABC launched its international TV broadcasting, but Radio Australia's budget was cut significantly under the Howard government, causing the closure of its Cantonese, Thai and French services, as well as shutting down the short-wave transmitter to South-East and North-East Asia. This move was condemned by newspaper editors (including that of The Australian) and politicians alike, who saw the loss of Australia's ability to wield "soft power" in the region. The Mansfield Review which had led to the cuts also suggested that international television could be supported by the Department of Foreign Affairs & Trade. Due to financial and political pressures transmissions from Darwin's Cox Peninsula were also shut down in the late 1990s.

In January 2017 the ABC terminated its last short-wave radio broadcasts to the Pacific region. Vanuatu's prime minister, Charlot Salwai, expressed concern, with his country having been helped by the short-wave service during Cyclone Pam in 2015; short-wave transmission is capable of reaching remote islands without FM services, enabling the provision of emergency information and warnings. ABC's former frequencies were bought by China Radio International, China's national broadcaster. ABC boss Michelle Guthrie was grilled in the Senate Estimates over axing short-wave radio broadcasting in February 2017. The decision attracted criticism from cattle station owners, Indigenous ranger groups and fishermen, who argue it was done without community consultation and would deprive people in remote areas of vital emergency warnings, leading to Nick Xenophon introducing legislation to force ABC to reinstate short-wave radio service. In September 2017 the Nick Xenophon Team announced it had negotiated a review of the reach of Australian broadcasting services in the Asia Pacific region, including examining if short-wave technology should be included in the Government's Media Reform Bill.

In December 2019, ABC Radio Australia celebrated 80 years of international radio broadcasting.

In December 2024, ABC Radio Australia celebrated 85 years of international radio broadcasting.

=== Transmission facilities ===
In almost 80 years of terrestrial service, Radio Australia has utilised a wide range of transmission facilities for delivery of its programmes to target areas, both from within Australia and from established international broadcasting sites overseas.

==== Shepparton, Vic (1941–2017) ====
In 1941, following consultation between the British and Australian governments, a transmitter site in Shepparton, Victoria was selected, in part because of a flat landscape and soil conductivity. The site was completed in 1944 with one 50 kW and two 100 kW transmitters. The station was then formally named Radio Australia.

==== Carnarvon, WA (1976–1996) ====
In the 1970s, test transmissions began from the 250 kW transmitter early in December 1975 and official test broadcasts began a couple of weeks later on 20 December 1975, the second transmitter was the 100 kW Harris and this unit began test broadcasts on 15 February in 1976, third transmitter, rated at 300 kW and designated as VLM, was taken into regular service on 6 May 1984, and the station was finally closed on 31 July 1996.

==== Cox Peninsula, Darwin, NT (1966–1997) ====
A new transmitting facility was installed by the Postmaster-General's Department at Cox Peninsula near Darwin in the late 1960s, rebroadcasting programs emanating from Radio Australia studios in Melbourne. Equipment included three Collins Radio 250 kW HF transmitters and five log-periodic antennas directed at East Asia and South-east Asia. The antennas were largely demolished by Cyclone Tracy on 25 December 1974, and Radio Australia broadcasts from this locality were not reinstated by Telecom Australia until about 1988.

==== Bald Hills, Brisbane, Qld (1973–1976) ====
In 1941, the PMGD acquired a site and then established transmission facilities at Bald Hills, Brisbane. The site was principally intended for the AM national broadcasting services 4QG and 4QR, but also for ABC HF Inland Service to serve remote northwest Queensland. From late 1973 to 1976 the site relayed the Radio Australia Papua New Guinea service on 11880 kHz.On the Air

==== Brandon, Qld (1989–2015) ====
The high power ABC AM station, 4QN Townsville, had been operating from a site at Brandon, south of Townsville since the early 1950s.On the Air In 1988, three STC 10 kW transmitters were relocated from the Lyndhurst site which had recently closed. Also relocated from Lyndhurst was a rotatable log periodic antenna, locked in direction towards Papua New Guinea. Scheduled transmissions commenced 7 May 1989 on 6020 kHz. A second phase of implementation commenced shortly thereafter with the installation of two TCI curtain arrays, one beamed towards PNG and the other towards the Coral Sea and beyond (Solomon Islands and Vanuatu). Portion of the antenna was salvaged from the cyclone damaged Cox Peninsula facility.

==== Shepparton, Vic – Amateur Radio (2020) ====
On 14–15 March 2020 the Shepparton and District Amateur Radio Club organised a special event station VI3RA, with amateur radio operators connecting their equipment to the disused antenna arrays at the Shepparton site in order to communicate with amateur radio operators worldwide.

== Target areas ==
Radio Australia's short-wave signal was primarily aimed at the Asia-Pacific region. Programming was broadcast in multiple languages, namely English, Mandarin Chinese, Vietnamese, Indonesian, Khmer, French, Burmese, and Tok Pisin (a creole language commonly spoken in Papua New Guinea). A daily Pacific news bulletin is podcast in French. Though Radio Australia did not directly target North America via shortwave, some of its transmissions could be heard in those areas. ABC Radio Australia's satellite signals also broadcasts to the Indo-Pacific via Intelsat-18 and Intelsat-20 satellites.

A special log periodic antenna with 18dB gain was placed at the Shepparton site for the 1956 Olympics to target Europe for coverage of the games. It was directed 128 degrees (E by SE) at the long path across the South Pacific, Central America and the North Atlantic to Europe. The path was open on the 25 m Band for about two hours in the morning (Europe). A 50 kW transmitter was used to drive it. A daily program for Europe was maintained for a long time. The transmissions for Asia (with opposite direction of 308 degrees) were easily received in Europe.

Radio Australia could also be heard on CBC Radio across Canada during their overnight broadcast. The station resumed Fiji transmission through negotiations with the Ministry of Information and the Fiji Broadcasting Corporation (FBC) in July 2012. Radio Australia can be heard on 106.6FM in main cities of Fiji.

ABC Radio Australia can transmitted to DAB+ digital radio across all capital cities and some regional centres of Australia, the DAB+ service was launched in March 2026.

Radio Australia programs are also available via the Internet. These services are streamed from machines hosted by Akamai Technologies in Steinsel, Luxembourg ensuring good network connectivity for listeners in Europe.

=== Domestic Asia Pacific program ===
Asia Pacific was a regional news and current affairs program broadcast from Tuesday to Saturday at 12:05 am and repeated at 5 am on Radio National, for a domestic audience, from around or before 2009. It was created by Radio Australia, Asia Pacific was first launched in April 1998, and it ran until August 2014 after sixteen years on air. Schedule changes by ABC Radio Australia in 2013 saw the show lose its domestic radio audience.

== Programming ==
Radio Australia's English language programs consist of material produced by ABC Radio Australia, and also other ABC radio networks such as ABC Local Radio, Radio National, ABC Classic FM, Triple J, Triple J Unearthed, Double J, ABC Sport, and ABC NewsRadio, as well as SBS Radio's SBS Gagana Samoan program.

=== On the Record ===
On 4 July 2023, Radio Australia launched its new weekly music show, On The Record, hosted by Samoan-Australian music journalist, broadcaster, and content producer Sosefina Fuamoli. It features well-known artists from around the Pacific region, such as Tiana Khasi, Sprigga Mek, and Joji Malani, and is broadcast to Papua New Guinea, Fiji, and Samoa. Fuamoli wrote for The AU Review from about 2011 until 2018, taking up the position of editor-in-chief in January 2016. She left to start to a new role at triple j. Her work has appeared in Rolling Stone Australia, NME Australia, Junkee, and The Australian, among other publications, and she has acted as a judge in many major music awards. In 2020, she won the award for best Live Music Journalist at the National Live Music Awards. In 2021, she began hosting "Window Seat" on community radio station 3RRR in Melbourne, where she is based.

== Controversies ==
=== Indonesian killings in 1965–1966 ===
Radio Australia has been implicated in the Indonesian mass killings of 1965–66 for its propaganda broadcasts that contributed to the anti-Communist hysteria in Indonesia. At the time Radio Australia was the most popular foreign radio station in Indonesia and had a high signal strength. It was popular with students as it was the only station in Indonesia to play rock music. The Indonesian National Armed Forces gave Radio Australia daily briefings on what it should report and what phrases should be used. The station was instructed to report manipulations of the truth as if they were facts.

The Australian Department of External Affairs gave daily guidance to Radio Australia over its Indonesian broadcasts, instructed it on the topics it should report on and the phrases it should use, and often edited the station's programming. Radio Australia was instructed to not broadcast disavowals by the Communist Party (PKI) of responsibility for the attempted coup, and was told, "Radio Australia should not give the impression that the army alone was acting against the PKI. Civilian organisations should be mentioned as often as possible. ... Reports should never imply that the army or its supporters were in any way pro-Western or right wing." Radio Australia faithfully followed these guidelines.

The Australian ambassador, Mick Shann, encouraged Radio Australia to report manipulations and misconstructions of the truth in line with requests from the Indonesian Army, and told the station to not compromise the Army's position. He said Radio Australia's broadcasts were "excellent propaganda and of assistance to the anti-PKI forces" and "we must be a bit dishonest for a while."

Richard Woolcott explained his guidance to the radio station by saying "Radio Australia should, by careful selection of its news items, not do anything which would be helpful to the PKI and should highlight reports tending to discredit the PKI and show its involvement in the losing cause of the 30th September movement."

The propaganda encouraged militias and civilians to participate in the slaughter, and justifying the killings through the demonisation of the victims.

== Other international ABC services ==
ABC's Asia Pacific television network, as of 2021 known as ABC Australia, has been broadcasting to the region since 1993.

The ABC has increased its Internet presence for international audiences; the iview streaming service is available via an app, and ABC News Online includes Chinese-language and Tok Pisin articles.

ABC Pacific is the ABC's new digital home for the best Pacific Islands content from across the ABC website since 2022.

ABC Asia is the ABC's new digital home for the best Asian content from across the ABC website since 2023.

== See also ==
- History of broadcasting in Australia
- History of the Australian Broadcasting Corporation
