= Angela Brennan (painter) =

Australian artist (born 1960)

Angela Brenann
- Born: 1960 (age 65–66); Ballarat, Australia
- Education: RMIT University and University of Melbourne
- Known for: Painting, Ceramics

Angela Brennan (born 1960) is an Australian painter.

Brennan was born in Ballarat in 1960. She completed a fine arts degree, specialising in painting at Royal Melbourne Institute of Technology in 1982, and a Bachelor of Arts, majoring in philosophy at the University of Melbourne in 1992.

== Exhibitions ==
Brennan has exhibited extensively since the late 1980s, holding over 40 solo shows and participating in over 150 group exhibitions. She is represented by Niagara Galleries in Melbourne, Roslyn Oxley9 in Sydney, and Goddard de Fiddes in Perth. In 2006, the Monash University Museum of Art held a major survey exhibition of her work, titled Angela Brennan: every morning I wake up on the wrong side of capitalism. Other prominent shows have included Shut Up and Paint, 2016, National Gallery of Victoria, Melbourne; Climarte Poster Project, 2016 for CLIMARTE – Arts for a Safe Climate, Melbourne; Mr President…., Parkside Avenue, Brooklyn, New York; Melbourne Now, 2013, National Gallery of Victoria, Melbourne; On A Round Ball, 2013, China Art Projects, Hong Kong; Paintings and Drawings, 2005, The Gallery on Cork Street, London; and On the Brink: Abstraction of the 90s, 2000, Heide Museum of Modern Art, Melbourne. She has also participated in art fairs within Australia and overseas, such as the Melbourne Art Fair from 2004 to 2012, the Korea International Art Fair from 2010 to 2012, the Auckland Art Fair in 2009, and the Zurich Art Fair in 2004.

In 2025 Brennan entered the Archibald Prize at the Art Gallery of NSW with a portrait of her niece, journalist Bridget Brennan.

== Collections ==
Brennan's work appears extensively in public and private collections across Australia as well as overseas. She is featured in major state galleries, such as the National Gallery of Australia, National Gallery of Victoria, Art Gallery of South Australia and TarraWarra Museum of Art, as well as numerous private, corporate and university collections throughout Australia. Internationally, her work features in the Mont Blanc Art Collection in Switzerland and World Bank in New York, as well as in private collections in the United Kingdom, France, Canada, Israel, Japan and Singapore.

== Awards ==
Brennan has been the recipient of numerous awards, grants and residencies throughout her career. They have included the Australia Council Studio, Milan in 2008, Melbourne Savage Club prize in 2007, studio residency at Cité internationale des arts, Paris in 2006 and 1998, and Blundstone Contemporary Art Award in 1995. She has also been selected for a number of prolific art prize events, including the Geelong Contemporary Art Prize in 2012, the Flinders University Art Museum; the Mosman Art Prize in 2011, and The Dobell Drawing Prize in 2002.
