= Bridget Brennan (journalist) =

Australian journalist

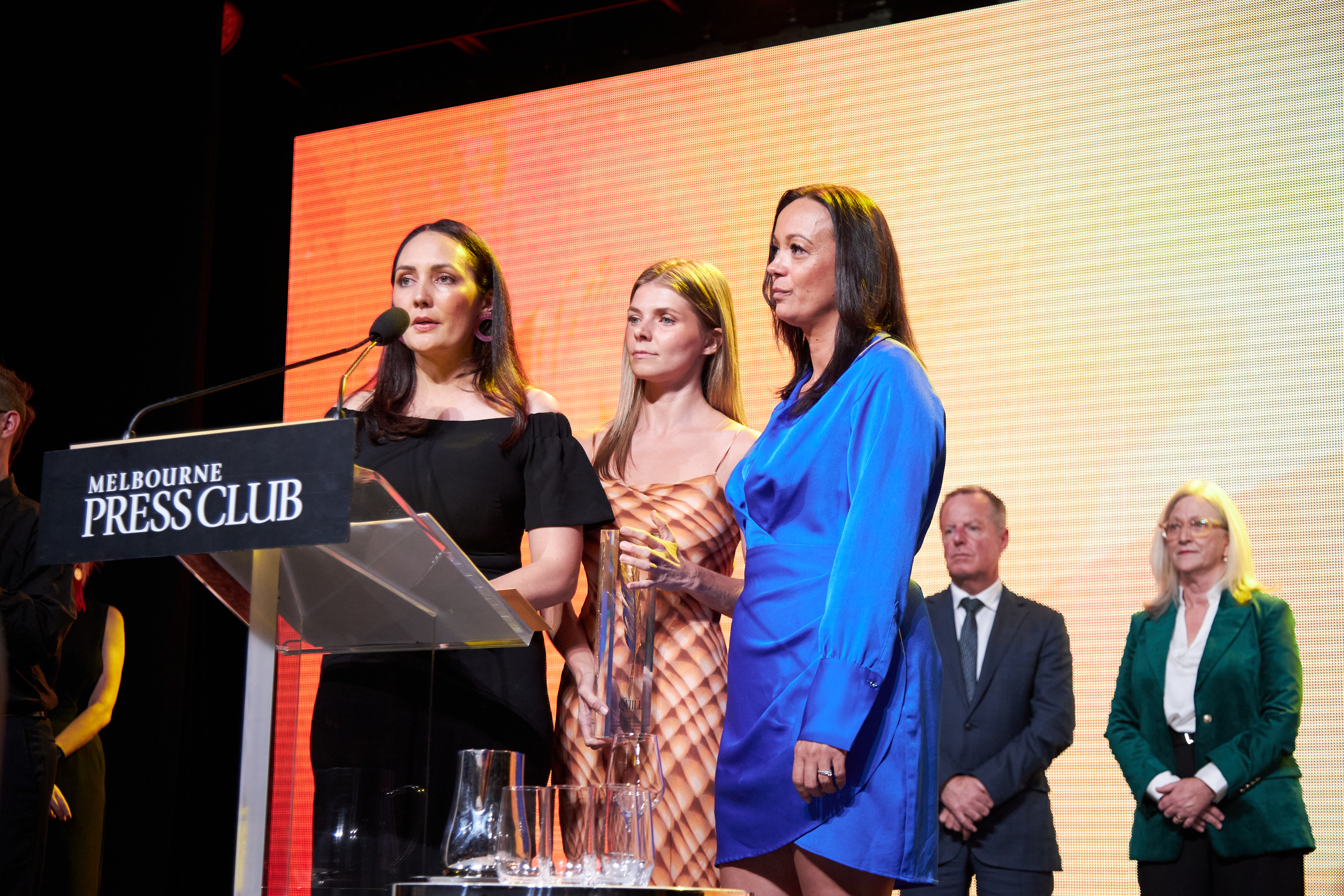
- Bridget Brennan (left foreground), Brooke Fryer and Suzanne Dredge receiving a Melbourne Press Club award
- Education: RMIT University (BComm)
- Occupation: Journalist
- Years active: 2011–present
- Television: News Breakfast, Four Corners, The Drum, Insiders

Bridget Brennan is an Australian journalist.

Brennan is co-host of the ABC's breakfast program News Breakfast alongside James Glenday.

She is a Yorta Yorta and Dja Dja Wurrung woman. She is niece to painter Angela Brennan.

== Career ==
Brennan joined the ABC as a cadet journalist in 2010. From 2011 to 2013, she was based in Darwin where she worked as a radio and television reporter.

After a brief period of working in Hong Kong for CNN, Brennan returned to the ABC in 2014 as a reporter for national radio current affairs programs AM, The World Today and PM.

After then working as on Background Briefing on Radio National, Brennan joined Four Corners as a researcher.

After being awarded the 2016 Andrew Olle scholarship, Brennan became the ABC's national Indigenous Affairs correspondent. This was a role she continued until she was appointed as the ABC's London-based Europe correspondent. She returned to Australia in 2020 and was appointed as the ABC's Indigenous Affairs editor leading mainstream and specialist programming like that for NAIDOC week.

On 14 June 2020, Brennan seemingly became the first non-white panelist on ABC TV's Sunday morning current affairs program Insiders. The invitation to appear on Insiders was issued after criticism the program received, including from Brennan, for having an all-white panel (consisting of Patricia Karvelas, David Crowe and Katharine Murphy) discuss the Black Lives Matter movement the week prior. Junkee also reported that it appeared the show had never had a person of colour appear as a panelist in the history of Insiders. When asked about the issue on Insiders, Brennan stated: "It is not good enough any more, particularly at this moment, but I would say any week, to have a panel of white people speaking about issues when there is very little lived experience of discrimination and racism on that panel."

Brennan hosted the summer edition of The Drum throughout December 2021 and January 2022.

Along with Dan Bourchier, Brennan co-hosted a special edition of Speaking Up on the ABC News channel about the Uluru Statement from the Heart and the Indigenous Voice to Parliament on 6 July 2022.

Following Leigh Sales' decision to step down from hosting 7.30 in 2022, Brennan was reported to be one of three ABC journalists approached by senior ABC management about potentially succeeding Sales on the program, with the others being Sarah Ferguson and David Speers.

In November 2023, ABC announced that Brennan will join News Breakfast as news presenter and co-host the show one day per week whilst Lisa Millar works on other projects.

In August 2024, Brennan was appointed as Lisa Millar's replacement as co-host of News Breakfast. Brennan was also part of the panel for 2025 Australian Federal Election coverage.

In 2025, Brennan was the subject of a painting by Angela Brennan for the Archibald Prize at the Art Gallery of NSW.

== Awards ==
Brennan was part of the first female Indigenous Four Corners reporting team when they investigated the issue of femicide experienced by First Nations women in Australia. Brennan along with Suzanne Dredge, Brooke Fryer and Stephanie Zillman won the Gold Quill at the 2023 Melbourne Press Club Quill Awards for the Four Corners report, entitled "How many more?". The story also won the Quill Award for Excellence in Indigenous Affairs reporting.

== Views ==
In March 2022, she was highly critical of The Australian's coverage of the acquittal of Zachary Rolfe who was found not guilty of murdering Kumanjayi Walker. Brennan accused the newspaper of "traumatising, unethical and appalling reporting."

Speaking about the proposed Indigenous Voice to Parliament on Insiders in July 2022, Brennan suggested Aboriginal Australians deserve reparations as part of the reconciliation process, stating: "This has to be about justice, this has to be about reparations. It has to be about giving some power to Aboriginal communities." Despite racist personal attacks against her Brennan has continued to be an advocate.

In the leadup to the 2025 Australian Federal Election and in response to racist remarks during Anzac Day celebrations, Brennan advocated for the Welcome and Acknowledgement of Country.

Media offices
| Preceded by Lisa Millar | News Breakfast; Co-host with James Glenday; 26 August 2024 – present | Succeeded by Incumbent |
