= ABC Canberra (TV station) =

ABC

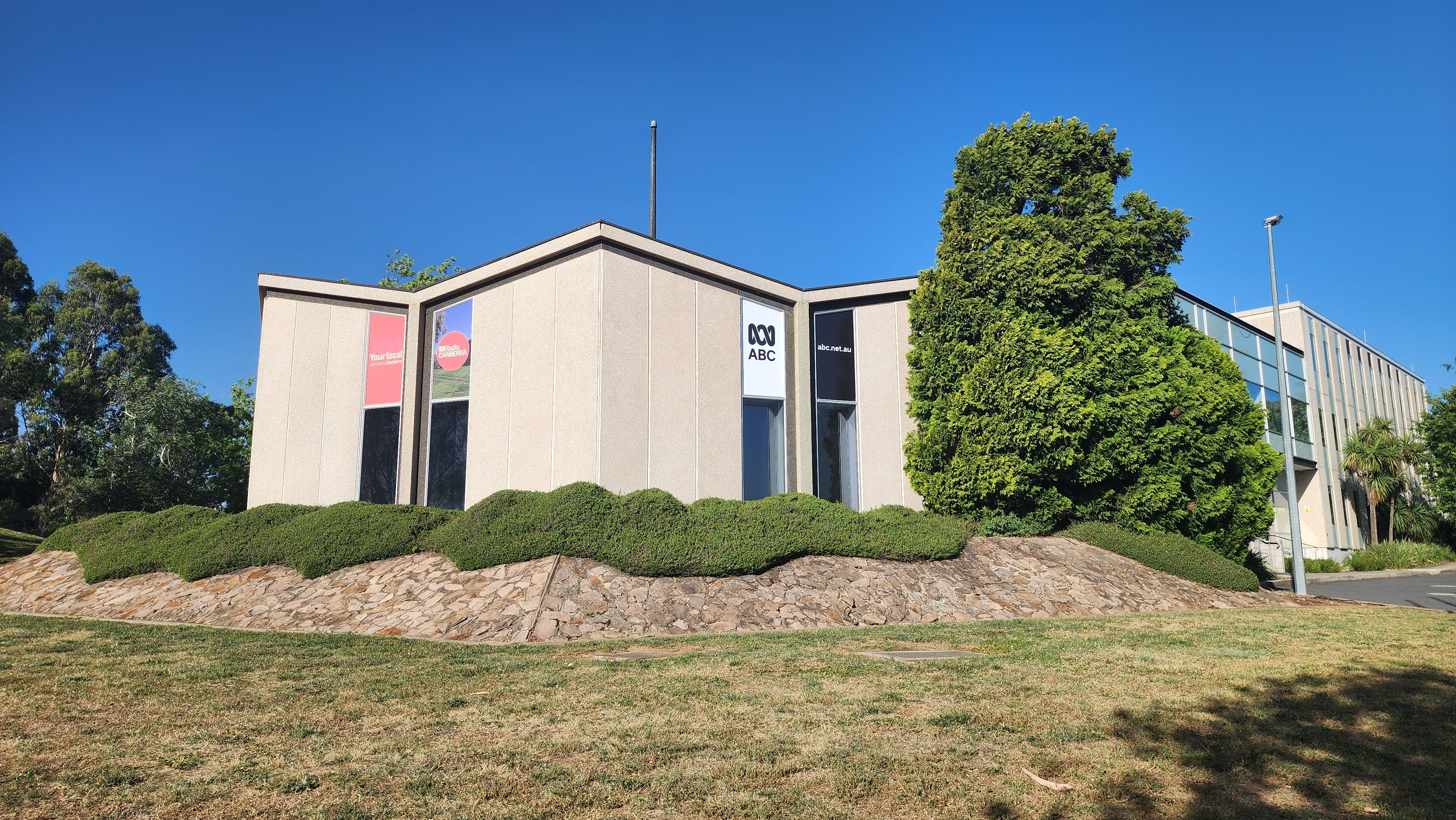
- Canberra, Australian Capital Territory; Australia
- Channels: Digital: 8 (VHF); Virtual: 2

Programming
- Language: English
- Affiliations: ABC Television

Ownership
- Owner: Australian Broadcasting Corporation

History
- First air date: 18 December 1962
- Former channel numbers: 3 (VHF) (1962–1996)(analogue); 9 (VHF) (1996–2012)(analogue); 9A (VHF) (2003–2014) (digital)
- Call sign meaning: ABC/Canberra

Technical information
- Licensing authority: Australian Communications and Media Authority
- ERP: 50 kW (digital)
- HAAT: 362 m (digital)
- Transmitter coordinates: 35°16′32″S 149°5′52″E

ABC Television in the ACT comprises national and local programming on the ABC television network in the Australian Capital Territory, which includes the capital city of Australia, Canberra, and broadcasts on a number of channels under the ABC call sign. There is some local programming from the Canberra studio, most notably the nightly 7PM News, presented by Greg Jennett and Adrienne Francis.

ABC was the historic call sign of the Australian Broadcasting Corporation's television station in Canberra which launched in 1962, with the "C" in the call sign standing for Canberra. It was also referred to as ABC-3 (not to be confused with the later ABC Me children's channel launched in 2009).

== History ==
The station began broadcasting as ABC-3 on 18 December 1962, soon before prime minister Robert Menzies officially opened the new station at a special reception at Hotel Canberra. The "C" in the call sign stands for Canberra.

Unusually, the station commenced transmission before a local television studio was able to be constructed, with initial transmission of ABC-3 being a direct relay of ABN-2 in Sydney. The station opened at 3pm on 18 December 1962 with a test card and music, followed by Kindergarten Playtime at 4:45pm. ABC-3's main transmitter was constructed at Black Mountain.

ABC-3 began broadcasting local programs on 3 June 1963 from a temporary studio in the existing 2CN/2CY building in Civic. Mervyn Edie was the first person to read the local news on ABC-3.

New ABC studios were constructed in Northbourne Avenue in Dickson. Local ABC radio services commenced broadcasting from the new facility on 3 August 1964. ABC-3 commenced television programs from the new studios on 8 October 1964 when the local news became the first program to be broadcast. The new studios were officially opened by Postmaster General Alan Hulme on 22 October 1964. ABC chairman James Ralph Darling and senator John Gorton also spoke at the event.

Local television programs to be broadcast from the ABC-3 studios in the station's early years included Southern Gardener, Canberra Week, Studio 11, Canberra Camera along with local news, sport and weather.

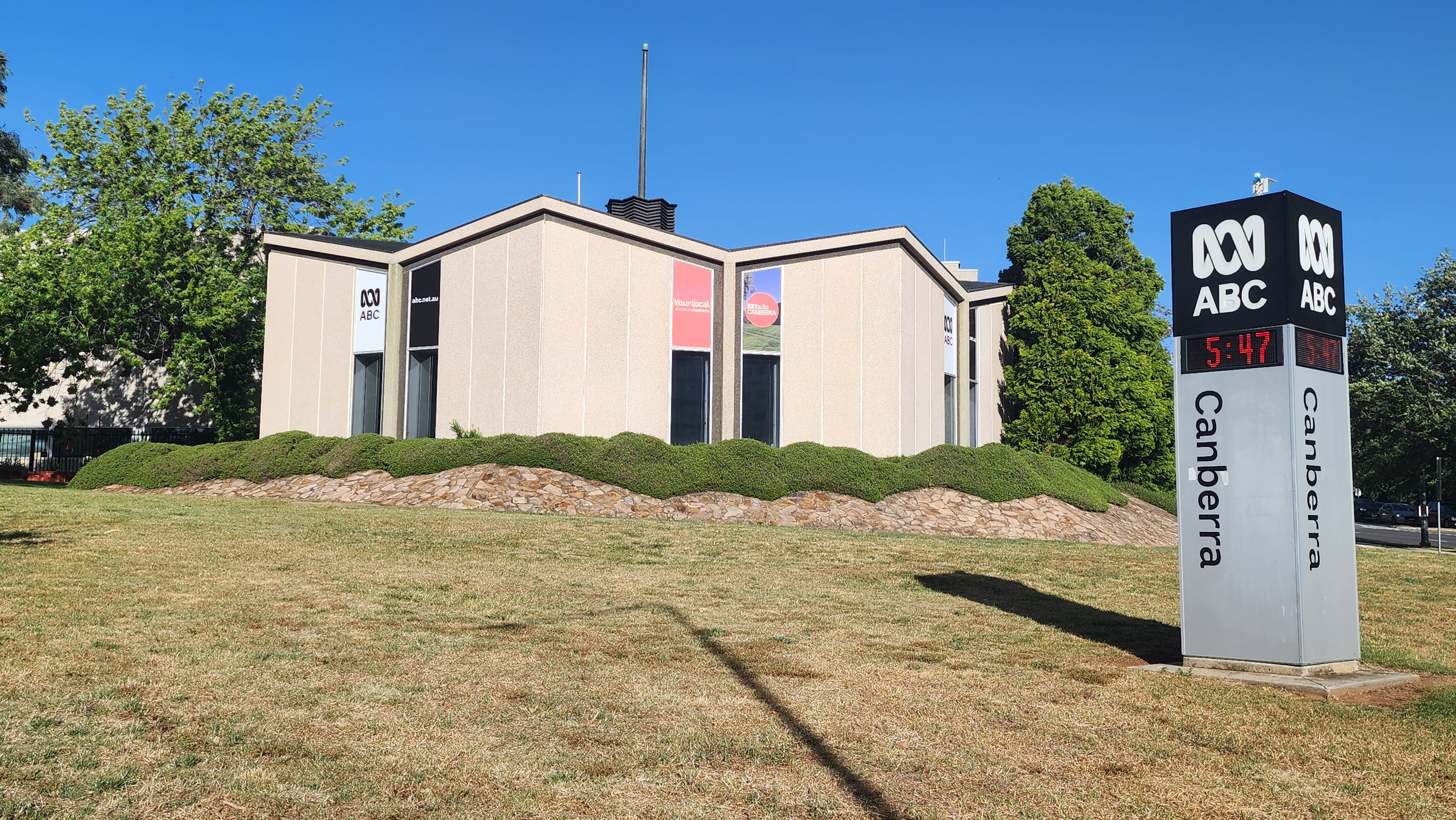
View from Northbourne Avenue

For 22 years, ABC-3's local news was a brief five minute bulletin which went to air each night at 6:55pm. This ended on 15 February 1985 as the station prepared to produce a new 10-minute bulletin which was expected to go to air at approximately 7:20pm each night towards the end of the ABC's new national news program The National hosted by Richard Morecroft and Geraldine Doogue. When The National ended and state based news bulletins were reinstated on 9 December 1985, local news continued to be provided in a brief segment during the New South Wales edition of ABC News until a dedicated 30 minute local news bulletin commenced in Canberra in February 1989, read by Janet Wilson.

When Wilson left in late 1989, she was replaced with Claudia Emery. Emery continued to present the bulletin until August 1991 when local news production was entirely axed amid the Hawke government's funding cut to the ABC totaling $15 million. The local ABC News bulletin was replaced with the New South Wales edition presented by Richard Morecroft from Sydney. Emery and weather presenter Peter Leonard were among the attendees of a "wake" which had been organised following the airing of the final local ABC News bulletin in Canberra.

A local ACT edition of ABC News was re-introduced in 2001, presented by Virginia Haussegger. This was the same year that Southern Cross Broadcasting axed Ten Capital News, leaving the ABC and WIN Television as being the only stations to have a locally presented news bulletin from studios in Canberra.

When WIN Television closed their Canberra studio in 2013 and relocated the production of their local WIN News bulletin to Wollongong, New South Wales, the ABC was left as the only remaining station to have a locally presented news bulletin produced in Canberra for ACT viewers.

Canberra was the first city in Australia in which analogue television was switched off, in 2012, meaning that only digital television services are transmitted.

In November 2014, it was announced the long-running weekly local current affairs program 7.30 ACT (previously known as Stateline) would be axed due to the Abbott government's funding cuts to the ABC. The final edition went to air on 5 December 2014.

After 15 year of reading ABC News Canberra, Virginia Haussegger resigned and read her final bulletin in October 2016. Haussegger was succeeded by Dan Bourchier who started presenting ABC News Canberra in January 2017.

In 2019, the ABC in Canberra introduced an Acknowledgement of Country during ABC News Canberra. Ngunnawal elders were present in the television studio to witness the first edition of ABC News Canberra to include the Acknowledgement of Country go to air which saw Dan Bourchier sign off by saying: "And that's the latest from the Canberra newsroom, proudly broadcasting from the land of the Ngunnawal people. As part of our ongoing commitment to Indigenous recognition, the ABC is partnering with the United Ngunnawal Elders Council and pays respect to them — the first people of this land. I'm Dan Bourchier, Yarra, Goodnight". Bourchier had opened the bulletin by saying "Yuma", the traditional greeting with graphics behind him including the words "Ngunnawal Country".

A new standing set was installed in July 2022, to allow ABC News presenters to either stand at the news desk or in front of the large plasma screen with relevant graphics displayed behind them.

At the end of 2022, former ABC foreign correspondent James Glenday was announced as the new host of ABC News Canberra.

It was announced in May 2023 that ABC TV's Sunday morning public affairs program Insiders hosted by David Speers would be relocating to the Canberra studio after more than two decades of being broadcast live from the Melbourne studio. The first edition of Insiders to be broadcast live from Canberra went to air on 9 July 2023.

== ABC Television in ACT today ==
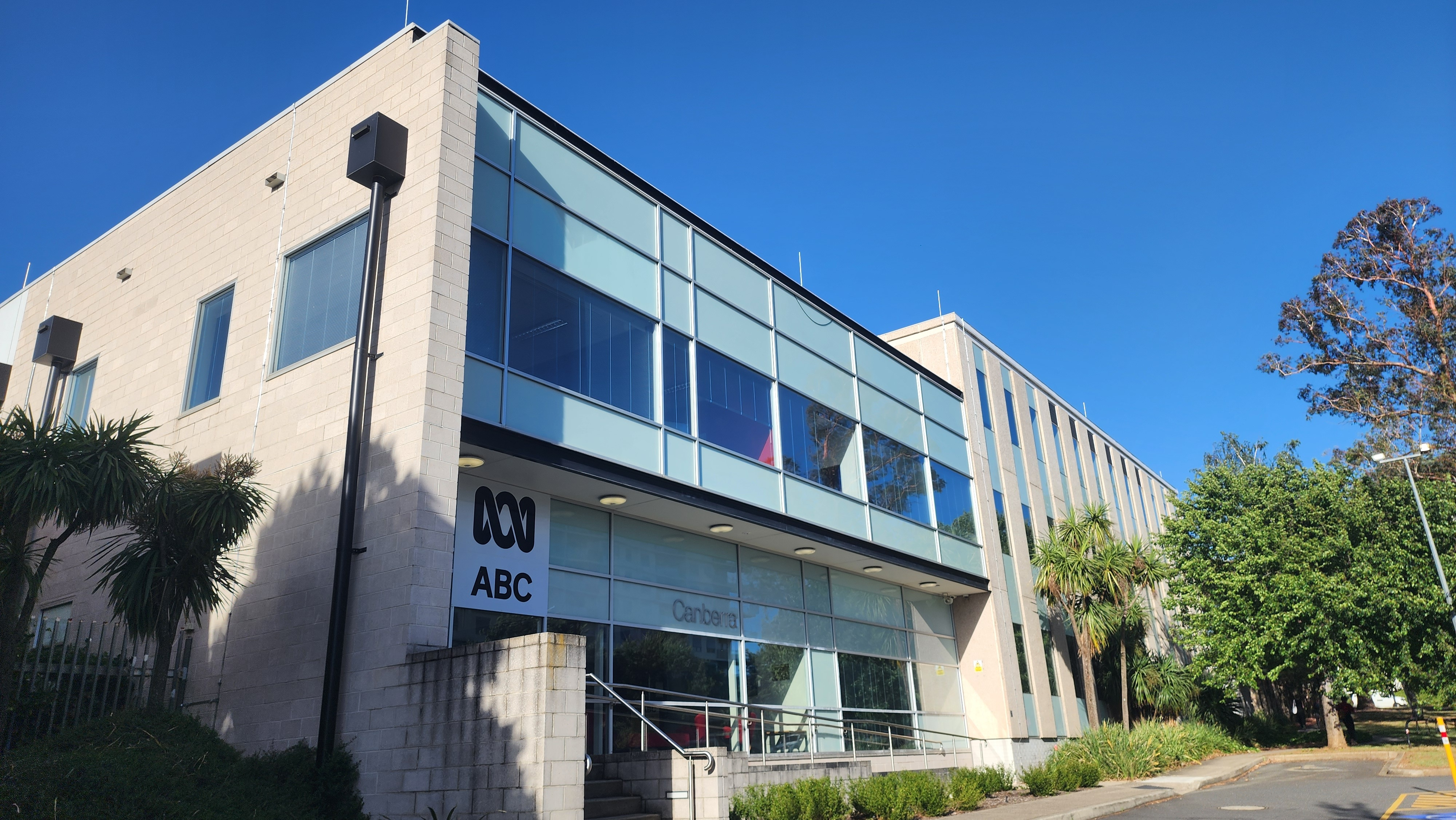
Entrance from Wakefield Avenue

As of 2021 there are four transmitters broadcasting ABC channels 8, 36 and 41, with one still situated on Black Mountain.

Most households in New South Wales near the border to ACT such as Queanbeyan, Cooma, Goulburn and Yass receive the Canberra edition of the ABC 7pm bulletin.

=== Local programming ===
ABC News Canberra is presented by Greg Jennett from Sunday to Thursday and Adrienne Francis on Friday and Saturday.

The weeknight bulletins incorporate a national finance section presented by David Chau in Sydney.

A new studio set was introduced in mid-2014 to match the rest of the ABC News network.

There was another studio upgrade in 2022, making the studio completely standing.

The weekly current affairs program, 7.30 ACT was presented by Chris Kimball until its cancellation in 2014 in a round of severe cuts to the ABC.
