= The Coming Out Show =

The Coming Out Show was a radio program about women's issues broadcast by Australian Broadcasting Corporation.

The program was first broadcast on ABC Radio 2 (now Radio National) in 1975, the United Nations designated International Women's Year, and ran for 23 years (until c.1998). It was launched as Coming Out Ready Or Not, produced by the Australian Women's Broadcasting Cooperative.

The 1995 book The Coming Out Show: Twenty years of feminist ABC Radio, edited by Liz Fell and Carolin Wenzel, tells the story of the program.
