= Dan Bourchier =

Australian journalist and television presenter

- Occupations: journalist, television presenter, radio host
- Years active: 2007–present
- Known for: reporting for Sky News Australia, presenting news bulletins for ABC TV, hosting ABC Radio programs
- Notable work: Leading the ABCs coverage of the Voice to Parliament as ABC Referendum/Voice Correspondent; Host of The Drum,ABC News Canberra (ABC TV), Canberra Breakfast (ABC Radio Canberra), Australian of the Year Awards, (ABC Local Radio), General Manager NITV

Dan Bourchier is an Australian journalist and television presenter, best known for his work at the Australian Broadcasting Corporation and Sky News Australia.

He is currently a senior newsreader on the ABC News Channel's Mornings program, and chair of the ABCs Bonner Committee. Previously, he led the ABC coverage of the Voice to Parliament as ABC referendum/voice correspondent, and hosting ABCs The Drum. He formerly presented the ACT edition of ABC News on the ABC TV station in Canberra from Sunday to Thursday each week.

He was a candidate for the staff-elected position on the Board of the ABC, typically pre-selected by the union of which many ABC staff are members. Bourchier did not commit to dropping out of the race if he was not pre-selected as a union backed candidate, and is one of eight candidates for the staff elected director role.

== Career ==
Bourchier grew up in Tennant Creek, Northern Territory. He first began reporting for his local newspaper, the Tennant and District Times at the age of 13. While he was employed to wash the windows of the newspaper office, he was sent to cover a local netball game which led him to become the newspaper's sports reporter. He then went on to join the NT News in 2007.

Bourchier commenced his television career in 2010 at NITV, working in Sydney and Canberra, before he joined Sky News Australia in 2012 where he became the chief of their Northern Territory bureau, based in Darwin. He then transferred to Canberra in October 2015 to work as a political reporter and national Indigenous affairs correspondent.

In 2017, Bourchier moved to ABC. From 16 February 2017, Bourchier commenced presenting the Monday to Thursday editions of the local ABC News bulletin on ABC TV in Canberra, succeeding Virginia Haussegger who left the station in October 2016.

From early 2017, Bourchier also commenced hosting the local breakfast program on ABC Radio Canberra, succeeding Philip Clark who had moved to Sydney to host the national Nightlife program. In December 2019, it was announced Bourchier would leave his role as ABC Radio Canberra's breakfast presenter and would be succeeded by Lish Fejer.

In 2019, Bourchier commenced incorporating an Acknowledgement of Country into ABC News Canberra. Ngunnawal elders were present in the ABC TV studio for the first bulletin where Bourchier greeted viewers in the Ngunnawal language ("Yuma") before signing off at the end of the bulletin by saying "...and that's the latest from the Canberra newsroom, proudly broadcasting from the land of the Ngunnawal people. As part of our ongoing commitment to Indigenous recognition, the ABC is partnering with the United Ngunnawal Elders Council and pays respect to them — the first people of this land. I'm Dan Bourchier, Yarra, Goodnight." A screen behind Bourchier also included the words "Ngunnawal Country".

During the onset of the 2019–2020 Australian bushfires, Bourchier was forced to present ABC News Canberra from the footpath outside the ABC studios in Dickson when the building's smoke alarms were triggered shortly before 7pm by the thick bushfire smoke which had been blanketing the city.

Apart from his role on ABC TV in Canberra, Bourchier has also hosted the New South Wales edition of ABC News, and has anchored some content on the national ABC TV and ABC News channels including Weekend Breakfast. He regularly hosted The Drum, and appeared on Insiders.

He has also hosted national broadcasts from the Australian of the Year Awards in Canberra on the ABC Local Radio network.

Bourchier joined the board of Dart Centre Asia Pacific in April 2022. He left this board in July 2022.

Bourchier is an advocate of social justice, education, and equality, and is an ambassador of the Australian Indigenous Education Foundation, ; is an ambassador for the National Association of Aboriginal and Torres Strait Islander Health Workers and Practitioners (NAATSIHWP),; and an ambassador for the Pinnacle Foundation, .

In August 2025, Bourchier resigned from the ABC, and was appointed General Manager of SBS National Indigenous Television channel known as NITV.

== Personal life ==
Bourchier is an Indigenous Australian, with Aboriginal ancestry on his mother's side of the family. He is an advocate for First Nations Australians and is regularly invited to events to discuss relevant Indigenous issues, such as during National Reconciliation Week. Bourchier has also been involved in numerous Indigenous organisations including First Nation contemporary dance company Blakdance where he has served as chairperson and deputy chairperson. He is also an ambassador for the Australian Indigenous Education Foundation.

He is openly gay.

Bourchier is a proponent of gender and cultural diversity and refuses to be part of any panel discussions where women are not included. He also declines to facilitate discussions about a particular group of people without members of that group being part of the conversation.
